= Philippines women's national futsal team results =

This article details the international fixtures and results of the Philippines women's national futsal team.

== Results ==
Win Draw Lose Fixture

=== 2000s ===
==== 2005 ====
November 13 2005 Asian Indoor Games	Philippines	1–8	Thailand	Bangkok, Thailand
17:00		Report		Stadium: Thai-Japanese Youth Center Hall 2,

November 14 2005 Asian Indoor Games	Philippines	2–6	Uzbekistan	Bangkok, Thailand
15:00	Merlin 4'; Ruffy 11'			Stadium: Thai-Japanese Youth Center Hall 2

November 15 2005 Asian Indoor Games	Jordan	11–0	Philippines	Bangkok, Thailand
17:00		Report		Stadium: Thai-Japanese Youth Center Hall 2

November 16 2005 Asian Indoor Games	Jordan	9–3	Philippines	Bangkok, Thailand
15:00		Report		Stadium: Thai-Japanese Youth Center Hall 2

==== 2007 ====
October 28 2007 Asian Indoor Games	Philippines	3–6	Vietnam	IPM Multisport Pavilion, Macau
13:00	Ninobla 15'; Ariel 23'; Servillon 26'	Report	Phùng Thị Minh Nguyệt 8', 10', 18', 36', 38'; Nguyễn Tâm Thu 11'	Referee: Jassem Al-Khori (Qatar)

October 30 2007 Asian Indoor Games	Uzbekistan	7–1	Philippines	Tap Seac Multi-sports Pavilion, Macau
10:00	Moiseeva 2', 14'; Turapova 12', 16'; Usmanova 16', 22', 22'	Report	Ninobla 7'	Referee: Alireza Sohrabi (Iran)

October 31 2007 Asian Indoor Games	Malaysia	2–5	Philippines	Tap Seac Multi-sports Pavilion, Macau
10:00	Aishah Noor 32'; Yunus 40'	Report	Merlin 3', 17', 18'; Servillon 18'; Ruffy 28'	Referee: Kim Jang-kwan (South Korea)

November 2 2007 Asian Indoor Games	Philippines	2–18	Iran	Tap Seac Multi-sports Pavilion, Macau
10:00	Ninobla 14', 31'	Report	Meisami 4', 16', 16', 17', 23', 35', 37', 39'; Zareei 6', 8', 22', 27', 37'; Rezazadeh 27', 29'; Armat 30'; Ziv. Babaei 37'; Karimipour 38'	Referee: Sayfiddin Amanov (Uzbekistan)

December 7 2007 SEA Games	Malaysia	3–2	Philippines	Hua Mak Indoor Stadium
	Ariel 16'; Limbo 30'	Report	Rozana 17'; Noor 27', 28'

December 2007 SEA Games	Philippines	4–1	Laos
		Report

December 2007 SEA Games	Thailand	9–2	Philippines
		Report

December 13 2007 SEA Games 3rd Place Match	Malaysia	1–3	Philippines	Hua Mak Indoor Stadium
	Noor 36'	Report	Ninobla 9', 16'; Ariel 11'

=== 2010s ===
==== 2011 ====
November 18 2011 SEA Games	Myanmar	6–3	Philippines	POPKI Sports Hall, Jakarta
10:00	Khin Mar Lar Tun 6', 26', 38'; San San Maw 10', 27'; Aye Nandar Hlaing 38'	Report	Zacarias 5'; Pacificador 37'; Guico 40'

November 19 2011 SEA Games	Philippines	2–10	Indonesia	POPKI Sports Hall, Jakarta
12:30	Placencia 3'; Thomason 17'	Report	Rani 2', 7', 18', 19'; Novita 6', 23'; Retno 9'; Maulina 17', 24' unknown (?)

November 20 2011 SEA Games	Philippines	1–4	Vietnam	POPKI Sports Hall, Jakarta
12:30	Thomason 34'	Report	Nguyen Thi Thanh 8', 36'; Phan Le Ai Duyen 14'; Nguyen Thi Chau 37'

November 21 2011 SEA Games	Thailand	7–2	Philippines	POPKI Sports Hall, Jakarta
12:45	Orathai 1', 12'; Prapasporn 15', 25'; Darika 21'; Nipaporn 23'; Pisayaporn 26'	Report	Thomason 22', 34'

=== 2020s ===
==== 2022 ====
October 15 Friendly	Philippines	0–1	Guam	Manila, Philippines
16:30		Report	Koharu Minato	Stadium: Ninoy Aquino Stadium

October 16 Friendly	Philippines	3–1	Guam	Manila, Philippines
16:30	Hannah Marie Muros; Aurea Coleen Reaso; Jaqueline Ballares	Report	Koharu Minato	Stadium: Ninoy Aquino Stadium

==== 2023 ====
October 19 PFF Women's Tri Nation Futsal Invitational GS	Philippines	4–9	Indonesia	Manila, Philippines
18:00		Report		Stadium: Ninoy Aquino Stadium

October 20 PFF Women's Tri Nation Futsal Invitational GS	New Zealand	4–1	Philippines	Manila, Philippines
18:00	Manak 9'; Nicholson 15'; Kraakman 23'; Gillion 29'	Report	Ortillo 3'	Stadium: Ninoy Aquino Stadium

October 21 PFF Women's Tri Nation Futsal Invitational SF	New Zealand	0–1	Philippines	Manila, Philippines
16:00		Report	Rebosura 2'	Stadium: Ninoy Aquino Stadium

October 22 PFF Women's Tri Nation Futsal Invitational Final	Indonesia	5–2	Philippines	Manila, Philippines
16:00		Report		Stadium: Ninoy Aquino Stadium

==== 2024 ====
November 16 ASEAN Women's Futsal Championship GS	Philippines	2–2	Myanmar	Pasig, Philippines
19:00	Bandoja 12'; Danton 33'	Report	Lwin Lwin Thet 25'; Yoon Mie Mie Lwin 32'	Stadium: Philsports Arena

November 17 ASEAN Women's Futsal Championship GS	Thailand	7–0	Philippines	Pasig, Philippines
19:00	Sangrawee 6', 29'; Sawitree 8'; Paerploy 13'; Arriya 17'; Lalida 24'; Nattamon 40'	Report		Stadium: Philsports Arena; Referee: Qingyun Liang (China)

November 19 ASEAN Women's Futsal Championship GS	Vietnam	6–1	Philippines	Pasig, Philippines
19:00	Trần Thị Lan Mai 13', 28'; Lê Thị Thanh Ngân 21'; Nguyễn Phương Anh 26'; Trần Thị Thu Xuân 29'; K'Thủa 31'		del Campo 24'	Stadium: Philsports Arena

November 20 ASEAN Women's Futsal Championship GS	Philippines	1–2	Indonesia	Pasig, Philippines
19:00	Bandoja 12'	Report	Hendrita 7'; Rusdiana 39'	Stadium: Philsports Arena

==== 2025 ====
January 11 2025 AFC Women's Futsal Asian Cup qualification	Kuwait	1–4	Philippines	Tashkent, Uzbekistan
18:00 UTC+5	Sh. Mohammad 36'	Report	Guillou 4', 39'; Flanigan 22'; Tolentin 27'	Stadium: Yunusobod Sport Complex; Referee: Najat Al-Blooshi (United Arab Emirates)

January 13 2025 AFC Women's Futsal Asian Cup qualification	Philippines	3–3	Uzbekistan	Tashkent, Uzbekistan
15:00 UTC+5	Flanigan 4'; Guillou 15'; Connolly 39'	Report	Kudratova 8'; Karachik 23', 38'	Stadium: Yunusobod Sport Complex

January 15 2025 AFC Women's Futsal Asian Cup qualification	Turkmenistan	0–2	Philippines	Tashkent, Uzbekistan
15:00 UTC+5		Report	Guillou 23'; Tolentin 30'	Stadium: Yunusobod Sport Complex

January 19 2025 AFC Women's Futsal Asian Cup qualification	Philippines	1–2	Australia	Tashkent, Uzbekistan
15:00 UTC+5	Smit 20' (o.g.)	Report	Arrowsmith 7'; Au 21'	Stadium: Yunusobod Sport Complex

May 7 2025 AFC Women's Futsal Asian Cup	Iran	1–0	Philippines	Hohhot, China
11:00 UTC+8	Torkaman 38"	Report		Stadium: Hohhot Sports Centre; Attendance: 117; Referee: Liang Qingyun (China); Zhu Xin (China)

May 9 2025 AFC Women's Futsal Asian Cup	Philippines	0–3	Vietnam	Hohhot, China
11:00 UTC+8		Report	Trịnh Nguyễn Thanh Hằng 22"; Trần Thị Thu Xuân 33"; Lê Thị Thanh Ngân 40" (2pen.)	Stadium: Hohhot Sports Centre; Attendance: 280; Referee: Nour Chaito (Lebanon); Panadda Khotsenaphattra (Thailand)

May 11 2025 AFC Women's Futsal Asian Cup	Hong Kong	7–3	Philippines	Hohhot, China
11:00 UTC+8	So Hoi Lam 14", 34"; Kung Yuet Charis 17", 26"; Cheung Wai Ki 25"; Wu Choi Yiu 33", 35"	Report	Tolentin 13"; del Campo 33"; Bandoja 37"	Stadium: Hohhot Sports Centre; Referee: Mari Yamamoto (Japan); Nurul Atikah Janah (Malaysia)

September 26 Unofficial friendly	Japan	5–1	Philippines	Chiba, Japan
	Kazui 5'; Ikeuchi 11'; Ito 18'; Matsuki 5', 35'	Report	9'	Stadium: Prince Takamado Memorial JFA YUME Field Futsal Arena

September 28 Unofficial friendly	Japan	11–2	Philippines	Chiba, Japan
		Report		Stadium: Prince Takamado Memorial JFA YUME Field Futsal Arena

October/November Friendly	(Spain) Atico	1–6	Philippines	Sabadell, Spain
		Report

November 5 Friendly	(Spain) FS Sabadell	0–4	Philippines	Sabadell, Spain
		Report

November Friendly	(Spain) Lainco Rubí	3–1	Philippines	Sabadell, Spain
		Report

November 8 Friendly	Spain	7–1	Philippines	Las Rozas de Madrid, Spain
	Graversen 5' (og)	Report	Tolentin 18'	Stadium: La Ciudad del Fútbol; Referee: Ignacio del Olmo

November 21 2025 FIFA Futsal Women's World Cup	Philippines	0–6	Poland	Pasig, Philippines
20:30 UTC+8		Report	Basta 6'19", 23'55"; Matuszewska 18'18"; Szostak 22'18"; Ortillo 25'50", o.g.; Dymińska 29'53"	Stadium: PhilSports Arena; Attendance: 2,211; Referee: Anelize Schulz (Brazil)

November 24 2025 FIFA Futsal Women's World Cup	Philippines	2–3	Morocco	Pasig, Philippines
20:30 UTC+8	Tolentin 3'53"; Graversen 7'1"	Report	Laftah 9'47"; Tadlaoui 13'55"; Demraoui 16'56"	Stadium: PhilSports Arena; Attendance: 1,771; Referee: Alice Vevodova (Czech Republic)

November 27 2025 FIFA Futsal Women's World Cup	Argentina	5–1	Philippines	Pasig, Philippines
20:30 UTC+8	Villalba 1'35"; Romero 3'15"; Natta 3'57"; Chiesa 6'07"; Quevedo 6'56"	Report	Bandoja 27'24"	Stadium: PhilSports Arena; Attendance: 2,811; Referee: Krystin Pahia (United States)

December 12 2025 SEA Games GS	Thailand	7–1	Philippines	Samut Prakan, Thailand
16:30 UTC+9		Report		Stadium: Bangkokthonburi University Gymnasium

December 13 2025 SEA Games GS	Philippines	3–1	Malaysia	Samut Prakan, Thailand
16:30 UTC+9		Report		Stadium: Bangkokthonburi University Gymnasium

December 16 2025 SEA Games SF	Vietnam	1–0	Philippines	Samut Prakan, Thailand
16:30 UTC+9	Trần Nguyệt Vi 25'	Report		Stadium: Bangkokthonburi University Gymnasium

December 18 2025 SEA Games Bronze medal match	Thailand	5–0	Philippines	Samut Prakan, Thailand
13:30 UTC+9				Stadium: Bangkokthonburi University Gymnasium

==== 2026 ====
February 24 2026 ASEAN Women's Futsal Championship	Myanmar	v	Philippines	Nakhon Ratchasima, Thailand
16:00 UTC+9				Stadium: Terminal 21 Korat

February 25 2026 ASEAN Women's Futsal Championship	Philippines	v	Vietnam	Nakhon Ratchasima, Thailand
13:30 UTC+9				Stadium: Terminal 21 Korat

February 26 2026 ASEAN Women's Futsal Championship	Philippines	v	Australia	Nakhon Ratchasima, Thailand
16:00 UTC+9				Stadium: Terminal 21 Korat

== See also ==
- Futsal in the Philippines
