= Futsal at the 2025 SEA Games =

- Futsal pictogram

Event details
- Games: 2025 SEA Games
- Host country: Thailand
- Dates: 12–19 December
- Venues: 2 (in 2 host cities)
- Competitors: 154 from 6 nations

Men's tournament
- Teams: 5 (from 1 sub-confederation)
Medalists
Gold	Indonesia
Silver	Thailand
Bronze	Malaysia

Women's tournament
- Teams: 6 (from 1 sub-confederation)
Medalists
Gold	Vietnam
Silver	Indonesia
Bronze	Thailand

Editions
- ← 2021 2027 →

The futsal tournament at the 2025 SEA Games was held from 12 to 19 December 2025 in Thailand. Men's matches were held in Nonthaburi and women's matches were held in Bangkok.

Thailand were the five-time women's defending champions but lost in the semi-finals. Thailand were the five-time men's defending champions but lost by Indonesia 1–6 during the final match, which left them with an inferior goal difference. This marked the first time in history that two teams failed to win the tournament’s gold medal, as well as their first-ever failure on home soil.

== Venue ==
Location of the host cities of the futsal tournament of the 2025 SEA Games.

List of host cities and stadiums
City	Stadium	Capacity	Event
Nonthaburi	Nonthaburi Sports Complex Gymnasium	4,000	Men's tournament
Bangkok	Bangkokthonburi University Gymnasium	1,500	Women's tournament

== Participating nations ==
Nation	Men's	Women's
Indonesia	Yes	Yes
Malaysia	Yes	Yes
Myanmar	Yes	Yes
Philippines	No	Yes
Thailand	Yes	Yes
Vietnam	Yes	Yes
Total: 6 NOCs	5	6

== Draw ==
The women's futsal tournament draw was held on 19 October 2025. No draw was held for the men's tournament since the participating teams will be made to play in a single round robin.

== Competition format ==
The men's tournament plays in a single round-robin format.

The women's tournament plays in a group stage, the top two winners from the group stage advance to the semi-finals.

== Men's tournament ==
Pos	Team	Pld	W	D	L	GF	GA	GD	Pts	Final Result
1	Indonesia (C)	4	3	0	1	13	4	+9	9	Gold medal
2	Thailand (H)	4	3	0	1	13	8	+5	9	Silver medal
3	Malaysia	4	2	0	2	14	12	+2	6	Bronze medal
4	Vietnam	4	2	0	2	8	8	0	6	
5	Myanmar	4	0	0	4	4	20	−16	0	

Source: VFF
(C) Champions; (H) Hosts

== Women's tournament ==
=== Group stage ===
==== Group A ====
Pos	Team	Pld	W	D	L	GF	GA	GD	Pts	Qualification
1	Thailand (H)	2	2	0	0	13	1	+12	6	Advance to knockout stage
2	Philippines	2	1	0	1	4	8	−4	3	Advance to knockout stage
3	Malaysia	2	0	0	2	1	9	−8	0	

Source: VFF
(H) Hosts

==== Group B ====
Pos	Team	Pld	W	D	L	GF	GA	GD	Pts	Qualification
1	Vietnam	2	2	0	0	7	3	+4	6	Advance to knockout stage
2	Indonesia	2	1	0	1	5	3	+2	3	Advance to knockout stage
3	Myanmar	2	0	0	2	2	8	−6	0	

Source: VFF

=== Knockout stage ===
Semi-finals
16 December – Bangkok
Thailand	4 (6)
Indonesia	4 (7)
16 December – Bangkok
Vietnam	1
Philippines	0

Gold medal match
18 December – Bangkok
Indonesia	0
Vietnam	5
Bronze medal match
18 December – Bangkok
Thailand	5
Philippines	0

== Medal table ==
* Host nation (Thailand)

Rank	Nation	Gold	Silver	Bronze	Total
1	Indonesia (INA)	1	1	0	2
2	Vietnam (VIE)	1	0	0	1
3	Thailand (THA)*	0	1	1	2
4	Malaysia (MAS)	0	0	1	1
Totals (4 entries)		2	2	2	6

=== Medalists ===
Event	Gold	Silver	Bronze
Men's tournament	Indonesia	Thailand	Malaysia
Women's tournament	Vietnam	Indonesia	Thailand

== See also ==
- Football at the 2025 SEA Games
- 2025 SEA Games
