= Futsal at the 2017 SEA Games – Women's tournament =

2017 Southeast Asian Games Women's Football Tournament
Tournament details
- Host country: Malaysia
- Dates: 18–27 August 2017
- Teams: 5 (from 5 associations)
- Venue: 1 (in 1 host city)

The women's futsal tournament at the 2017 SEA Games was held from 18 to 27 August in Malaysia. In this tournament, 5 Southeast Asian teams competed in the women's competition.

All matches were played at Panasonic Stadium in Shah Alam.

== Competition schedule ==
The following was the competition schedule for the women's futsal competitions:

RR	Round robin

Fri 18	Sat 19	Sun 20	Mon 21	Tue 22	Wed 23	Thu 24	Fri 25	Sat 26	Sun 27
RR		RR		RR			RR		RR

== Participating nations ==
The following five teams participated for the competition.

- Indonesia (INA)
- Malaysia (MAS)
- Myanmar (MYA)
- Thailand (THA)
- Vietnam (VIE)

== Draw ==
There are no official draw since only 5 teams participating in this competition. All teams are automatically drawn to one group.

== Competition format ==
- Round robin; the team with the best record wins the gold medal.

== Results ==
- All times are Malaysia Standard Time (UTC+8).

Pos	Team	Pld	W	D	L	GF	GA	GD	Pts	Final Result
1	Thailand	4	3	1	0	27	5	+22	10	Gold medal
2	Vietnam	4	2	1	1	8	6	+2	7	Silver medal
3	Indonesia	4	2	1	1	8	6	+2	7	Bronze medal
4	Malaysia (H)	4	1	1	2	4	16	−12	4	
5	Myanmar	4	0	0	4	5	19	−14	0	

Source: KL2017 Official Website
(H) Hosts
18 August 2017
11:00

Vietnam	1–3	Thailand
Nguyen Thi Hue 39'		Darika Peanpailun 24'; Sasicha Phothiwong 30'; Jiraprapa Nimrattanasing 32'

Panasonic Stadium, Shah Alam
18 August 2017
17:30

Malaysia	2–1	Myanmar
Zur'ain Kamarudin 36'; Norhawa Md Yasin 37'		Pa Pa Win 2'

Panasonic Stadium, Shah Alam

20 August 2017
11:00

Myanmar	2–10	Thailand
Shwe Zin Aung 12', 19'		Sasicha Phothiwong 3', 18', 35'; Darika Peanpailun 5', 32'; Jiraprapa Nimrattanasing 12', 13', 24'; Jiraprapa Tupsuri 26'; Jenjira Bubpha 34'

Panasonic Stadium, Shah Alam
20 August 2017
17:00

Malaysia	1–2	Indonesia
Norhawa Md Yasin 33'		Novita Murni Piranti 11'; Susi Susanti 20'

Panasonic Stadium, Shah Alam

22 August 2017
11:00

Indonesia	3–1	Myanmar
Rani Mulyasari 4'; Maya Muharina 20'; Maulina Novryliani 39'		Rani Mulyasari 40' (og.)

Panasonic Stadium, Shah Alam
22 August 2017
17:00

Vietnam	1–1	Malaysia
Trinh Ngoc Hoa 5'		Steffi Sarge Kaur 30'

Panasonic Stadium, Shah Alam

25 August 2017
11:00

Myanmar	1–4	Vietnam
Mi Sat 33'		Do Thi Nguyen 2'; Lê Thị Thùy Linh 27'; Nguyễn Thị Thành 35'; Trinh Ngoc Hoa 39'

Panasonic Stadium, Shah Alam
25 August 2017
17:30

Thailand	2–2	Indonesia

Panasonic Stadium, Shah Alam

27 August 2017
11:00

Indonesia	1–2	Vietnam

Panasonic Stadium, Shah Alam
27 August 2017
17:00

Malaysia	0–12	Thailand

Panasonic Stadium, Shah Alam
