= Futsal at the 2021 SEA Games – Women's tournament =

2021 SEA Games -Women's Futsal Tournament
Tournament details
- Host country: Vietnam
- Dates: 15–19 May 2022
- Teams: 4 (from 4 associations)
- Venue: 1 (in 1 host city)

Final positions
- Champions: Thailand (5th title)
- Runners-up: Vietnam
- Third place: Malaysia
- Fourth place: Myanmar

Tournament statistics
- Matches played: 6
- Goals scored: 28 (4.67 per match)
- Top scorer(s): (Thailand) Paerploy Huajaipetch (3 goals)

The women's futsal tournament at the 2021 SEA Games was held from 15 to 19 May in Vietnam. In this tournament, 4 Southeast Asian teams played in the women's competition. Indonesia withdrew from the competition after the draw.

All matches were played at Hà Nam Gymnasium in Phủ Lý, Hà Nam.

== Competition schedule ==
The following was the competition schedule for the women's futsal competitions:

RR	Round robin

Sun 15	Mon 16	Tue 17	Wed 18	Thu 19
RR		RR		RR

== Venue ==
Futsal at the 2021 SEA Games – Women's tournament (Vietnam)	Hà Nam
Futsal at the 2021 SEA Games – Women's tournament (Vietnam)	Hà Nam Gymnasium
Futsal at the 2021 SEA Games – Women's tournament (Vietnam)	Capacity: 7,500

== Participating nations ==
The following four teams participated for the competition.

- Malaysia (MAS)
- Myanmar (MYA)
- Thailand (THA)
- Vietnam (VIE)

== Draw ==
There is no official draw since only 4 teams participating in this competition. All teams are automatically drawn to one group.

== Competition format ==
- Round robin; the team with the best record wins the gold medal.

== Final ranking ==
Pos	Team	Pld	W	D	L	GF	GA	GD	Pts	Final Result
1	Thailand	3	3	0	0	10	1	+9	9	Gold medal
2	Vietnam (H)	3	2	0	1	11	3	+8	6	Silver medal
3	Malaysia	3	0	1	2	4	11	−7	1	Bronze medal
4	Myanmar	3	0	1	2	3	13	−10	1	

(H) Hosts

== Results ==
- All times are Vietnam Standard Time (UTC+7).
15 May 2022
13:00

Thailand	4–0	Malaysia
Mutita 14'; Jenjira 15'; Darika 18'; Paerploy 32'

Hà Nam Gymnasium, Hà Nam
15 May 2022
16:00

Vietnam	6–0	Myanmar
Biện Thị Hằng 6'; Nguyễn Thị Châu 7'; Lê Thị Thanh Ngân 12'; Nguyễn Thị Vân Anh 15'; Lê Thu Thanh Hương 21'; Ya Min Lwin 40' (o.g.)

Hà Nam Gymnasium, Hà Nam
17 May 2022
13:00

Myanmar	0–4	Thailand
		Patitta 7'; Paerploy 9', 17'; Nant May Thazin 24' (o.g.)

Hà Nam Gymnasium, Hà Nam
17 May 2022
16:00

Malaysia	1–4	Vietnam
Siti Asnidah 34' (pen.)		Bùi Thị Trang 15', 25'; Trịnh Nguyễn Thanh Hằng 18', 31'

Hà Nam Gymnasium, Hà Nam
19 May 2022
13:00

Myanmar	3–3	Malaysia
May Thet Paing 9'; Nant May Thazin 16'; Yun Me Me Lwin 20'		Intan 1', 23': Siti Asnidah 38'

Hà Nam Gymnasium, Hà Nam
19 May 2022
16:00

Vietnam	1–2	Thailand
Trịnh Ngọc Hoa 32'		Patitta 25'; Sasicha 28'

Hà Nam Gymnasium, Hà Nam

== Goalscorers ==
There were 28 goals scored in 6 matches, for an average of 4.67 goals per match.

3 goals

- (Thailand) Paerploy Huajaipetch

2 goals

- (Malaysia) Intan Sarah Anisah
- (Malaysia) Siti Asnidah
- (Thailand) Patitta Moolpho
- (Vietnam) Bùi Thị Trang
- (Vietnam) Trịnh Nguyễn Thanh Hằng

1 goal

- (Myanmar) May Thet Paing
- (Myanmar) Nant May Thazin
- (Myanmar) Yun Me Me Lwin
- (Thailand) Darika Peanpailun
- (Thailand) Jenjira Bubpha
- (Thailand) Mutita Senkram
- (Thailand) Sasicha Phothiwong
- (Vietnam) Biện Thị Hằng
- (Vietnam) Lê Thị Thanh Ngân
- (Vietnam) Lê Thu Thanh Hương
- (Vietnam) Nguyễn Thị Châu
- (Vietnam) Nguyễn Thị Vân Anh
- (Vietnam) Trịnh Ngọc Hoa

1 own goal

- (Myanmar) Ya Min Lwin (against Vietnam)
- (Myanmar) Nant May Thazin (against Thailand)

== See also ==
- Futsal at the 2021 SEA Games
- Futsal at the 2021 SEA Games - Men's tournament
- 2021 SEA Games
