= Orathai Srimanee =

Thai footballer (born 1988)

Personal information
- Full name: Orathai Srimanee
- Date of birth: 12 June 1988 (age 38)
- Place of birth: Sisaket, Thailand
- Height: 1.51 m (4 ft 11 1/2 in)
- Position: Midfielder

Team information
- Current team: BG Bundit Asia
- Number: 13

International career^{‡}
| Years | Team | Apps | (Gls) |
| 2009– | Thailand | 41 | (4) |
- ‡ National team caps and goals as of 11 June 2019

Orathai Srimanee (Thai: อรทัย ศรีมณี; born 12 June 1988) is a Thai international footballer who plays as a midfielder for the Thailand national women's team.

== International goals ==
=== National team ===
| No. | Date | Venue | Opponent | Score | Result | Competition |
|---|---|---|---|---|---|---|
| 1. | 17 September 2014 | Incheon Namdong Asiad Rugby Field, Incheon, South Korea | Maldives | 8–0 | 10–0 | 2014 Asian Games |
| 2. | 3 May 2015 | Thống Nhất Stadium, Ho Chi Minh City, Vietnam | Indonesia | 10–1 | 10–1 | 2015 AFF Women's Championship |
| 3. | 5 May 2015 | Thống Nhất Stadium, Ho Chi Minh City, Vietnam | Laos | 9–0 | 12–0 | 2015 AFF Women's Championship |
| 4. | 5 May 2015 | Thống Nhất Stadium, Ho Chi Minh City, Vietnam | Laos | 12–0 | 12–0 | 2015 AFF Women's Championship |
| 5. | 11 June 2015 | TD Place Stadium, Ottawa, Canada | Ivory Coast | 1–1 | 3–2 | 2015 FIFA Women's World Cup |
| 6. | 11 June 2015 | TD Place Stadium, Ottawa, Canada | Ivory Coast | 2–1 | 3–2 | 2015 FIFA Women's World Cup |
| 7. | 21 January 2017 | Century Lotus Stadium, Foshan, China | Ukraine | 1–0 | 1–0 | 2017 Four Nations Tournament |
| 8. | 15 August 2017 | UM Arena Stadium, Kuala Lumpur, Malaysia | Myanmar | 3–2 | 3–2 | 2017 Southeast Asian Games |
| 9. | 20 August 2017 | UiTM Stadium, Shah Alam, Malaysia | Malaysia | 1–0 | 6–0 | 2017 Southeast Asian Games |
| 10. | 20 August 2017 | UiTM Stadium, Shah Alam, Malaysia | Malaysia | 3–0 | 6–0 | 2017 Southeast Asian Games |

=== Futsal ===
| No. | Date | Venue | Opponent | Score | Result | Competition |
|---|---|---|---|---|---|---|
| 1. | 28 October 2007 | Sé, Macau | Malaysia | 3–0 | 17–0 | 2007 Asian Indoor Games |
| 2. | 28 October 2007 | Sé, Macau | Malaysia | 5–0 | 17–0 | 2007 Asian Indoor Games |
| 3. | 28 October 2007 | Sé, Macau | Malaysia | 9–0 | 17–0 | 2007 Asian Indoor Games |
| 4. | 28 October 2007 | Sé, Macau | Malaysia | 13–0 | 17–0 | 2007 Asian Indoor Games |
| 5. | 29 October 2007 | São Lázaro, Macau | Iran | 1–0 | 8–2 | 2007 Asian Indoor Games |
| 6. | 29 October 2007 | São Lázaro, Macau | Iran | 3–0 | 8–2 | 2007 Asian Indoor Games |
| 7. | 3 November 2007 | São Lázaro, Macau | Japan | 2–2 | 2–2 (a.e.t.) (1–3 p) | 2007 Asian Indoor Games |
| 8. | 17 November 2011 | Jakarta, Indonesia | Indonesia | 1–0 | 8–0 | 2011 SEA Games |
| 9. | 17 November 2011 | Jakarta, Indonesia | Indonesia | 3–0 | 8–0 | 2011 SEA Games |
| 10. | 17 November 2011 | Jakarta, Indonesia | Indonesia | 7–0 | 8–0 | 2011 SEA Games |
| 11. | 20 November 2011 | Jakarta, Indonesia | Myanmar | 1–0 | 14–8 | 2011 SEA Games |
| 12. | 20 November 2011 | Jakarta, Indonesia | Myanmar | 5–? | 14–8 | 2011 SEA Games |
| 13. | 20 November 2011 | Jakarta, Indonesia | Myanmar | 6–2 | 14–8 | 2011 SEA Games |
| 14. | 20 November 2011 | Jakarta, Indonesia | Myanmar | 7–? | 14–8 | 2011 SEA Games |
| 15. | 20 November 2011 | Jakarta, Indonesia | Myanmar | 9–6 | 14–8 | 2011 SEA Games |
| 16. | 20 November 2011 | Jakarta, Indonesia | Myanmar | 12–6 | 14–8 | 2011 SEA Games |
| 17. | 21 November 2011 | Jakarta, Indonesia | Philippines | 1–0 | 7–2 | 2011 SEA Games |
| 18. | 21 November 2011 | Jakarta, Indonesia | Philippines | 2–0 | 7–2 | 2011 SEA Games |
| 19. | 22 November 2011 | Jakarta, Indonesia | Vietnam | 1–0 | 4–2 | 2011 SEA Games |
| 20. | 26 June 2013 | Incheon, South Korea | Vietnam | 1–1 | 4–1 | 2013 Asian Indoor and Martial Arts Games |
| 21. | 30 June 2013 | Incheon, South Korea | Hong Kong | 2–0 | 6–1 | 2013 Asian Indoor and Martial Arts Games |
| 22. | 30 June 2013 | Incheon, South Korea | Hong Kong | 3–0 | 6–1 | 2013 Asian Indoor and Martial Arts Games |
| 23. | 30 June 2013 | Incheon, South Korea | Hong Kong | 4–1 | 6–1 | 2013 Asian Indoor and Martial Arts Games |
| 24. | 30 June 2013 | Incheon, South Korea | Hong Kong | 5–1 | 6–1 | 2013 Asian Indoor and Martial Arts Games |
| 25. | 1 July 2013 | Incheon, South Korea | Malaysia | 1–0 | 6–1 | 2013 Asian Indoor and Martial Arts Games |
| 26. | 1 July 2013 | Incheon, South Korea | Malaysia | 3–1 | 6–1 | 2013 Asian Indoor and Martial Arts Games |
| 27. | 3 July 2013 | Incheon, South Korea | Japan | 1–2 | 1–2 | 2013 Asian Indoor and Martial Arts Games |
| 28. | 5 July 2013 | Incheon, South Korea | Indonesia | 1–1 | 5–1 | 2013 Asian Indoor and Martial Arts Games |
| 29. | 5 July 2013 | Incheon, South Korea | Indonesia | 2–1 | 5–1 | 2013 Asian Indoor and Martial Arts Games |
