= Trần Thị Thùy Trang =

Vietnamese footballer

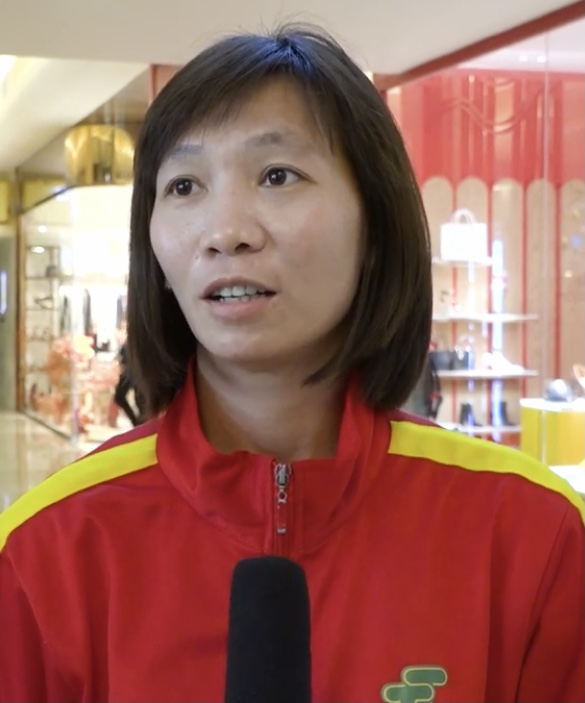

Personal information
- Date of birth: 8 August 1988 (age 38)
- Place of birth: Đại Lộc, Quảng Nam, Vietnam
- Height: 1.55 m (5 ft 1 in)
- Position: Midfielder

Team information
- Current team: Hồ Chí Minh City I
- Number: 88

Senior career*
Years	Team	Apps	(Gls)
2008–	Hồ Chí Minh City I	88	(9)

International career^{‡}
2010–	Vietnam Futsal		
2014–2023	Vietnam	60	(7)
- * Club domestic league appearances and goals ‡ National team caps and goals as of 29 September 2021

Trần Thị Thùy Trang (born 8 August 1988) is a Vietnamese footballer who plays as a midfielder for V-Women's League club Hồ Chí Minh City I and the Vietnam women's national futsal team. She is the first and only player to win a SEA Games gold medal both in football and futsal.

== Career ==
Thùy Trang began her career with futsal. She began her football career rather late.

Once she transitioned to 11v11 football, Thùy Trang became known for using her quick touches and awareness in tight spaces to excel in the midfield. Thùy Trang's composure and ability to create space and options across the pitch throughout matches led to her being known as "the calm amidst the chaos" to fans.

Thùy Trang won the Vietnamese Female Golden Ball in 2024 and the Bronze Ball in 2025.

== International Apps ==
As of match played 10 July 2023

Appearances and goals by national team and year
National Team	Year	Apps	Goals
Vietnam	2014	6	0
Vietnam	2015	10	1
Vietnam	2016	10	0
Vietnam	2017	4	1
Vietnam	2018	4	0
Vietnam	2019	0	0
Vietnam	2020	0	0
Vietnam	2021	2	1
Vietnam	2022	17	2
Vietnam	2023	7	2
Total		60	7

== International goals ==
=== National team ===
Scores and results list Vietnam's goal tally first.

No.	Cap.	Date	Venue	Opponent	Score	Result	Competition
1.	8.	6 May 2015	Hồ Chí Minh City, Vietnam	Philippines	2–0	4–0	2015 AFF Women's Championship
2.	27.	7 April 2017	Hanoi, Vietnam	Singapore	4–0	8–0	2018 AFC Women's Asian Cup qualification
3.	35.	23 September 2021	Dushanbe, Tajikistan	Maldives	5–0	16–0	2022 AFC Women's Asian Cup qualification
4.	44.	11 May 2022	Cẩm Phả, Vietnam	Philippines	2–1	2–1	2021 Southeast Asian Games
5.	50.	11 July 2022	Biñan, Philippines	Timor-Leste	6–0	6–0	2022 AFF Women's Championship
6.	57.	6 May 2023	Phnom Penh, Cambodia	Myanmar	3–1	3–1	2023 Southeast Asian Games
7.	59.	12 May 2023	Phnom Penh, Cambodia	Cambodia	3–0	4–0	2023 Southeast Asian Games

=== Futsal ===
No.	Date	Venue	Opponent	Score	Result	Competition
1.	17 November 2011	Jakarta, Indonesia	Myanmar	3–1	3–1	2011 SEA Games
2.	18 November 2011	Jakarta, Indonesia	Indonesia	5–0	6–0	2011 SEA Games
3.	18 November 2011	Jakarta, Indonesia	Indonesia	6–0	6–0	2011 SEA Games
4.	17 January 2025	Yangon, Myanmar	Macau	7–0	21–0	2025 AFC Women's Futsal Asian Cup qualification
5.	17 January 2025	Yangon, Myanmar	Macau	17–0	21–0	2025 AFC Women's Futsal Asian Cup qualification
6.	17 January 2025	Yangon, Myanmar	Macau	20–0	21–0	2025 AFC Women's Futsal Asian Cup qualification
7.	12 December 2025	Bangkok, Thailand	Indonesia	1–0	3–1	2025 SEA Games
8.	18 December 2025	Bangkok, Thailand	Indonesia	3–0	5–0	2025 SEA Games
9.	2 March 2026	Nakhon Ratchasima, Thailand	Indonesia	2–1	4–1	2026 ASEAN Women's Futsal Championship
