= Futsal at the SEA Games =

Futsal has been included in the Southeast Asian Games since 2007

Futsal has been a Southeast Asian Games sport since the 2007 edition.

== Results ==
=== Men's tournament ===
Year	Host	Final			Third Place Match		
Year	Host	Winner	Score	Runner-up	3rd Place	Score	4th Place
2007; Details	(Thailand); Nakhon Ratchasima	Thailand	5 – 0	Malaysia	Indonesia	11 – 1	Laos
2011; Details	(Indonesia); Jakarta	Thailand	8 – 3	Vietnam	Indonesia	3 – 2	Malaysia
2013; Details	(Myanmar); Naypyidaw	Thailand	8 – 1	Vietnam	Indonesia	6 – 5	Myanmar
2017; Details	(Malaysia); Kuala Lumpur	Thailand	RR	Malaysia	Vietnam	RR	Indonesia
2021; Details	(Vietnam); Hà Nam	Thailand	RR	Indonesia	Vietnam	RR	Myanmar
2025; Details	(Thailand); Nonthaburi	Indonesia	RR	Thailand	Malaysia	RR	Vietnam

=== Women's tournament ===
Year	Host	Final			Third Place Match		
Year	Host	Winner	Score	Runner-up	3rd Place	Score	4th Place
2007; Details	(Thailand); Nakhon Ratchasima	Thailand	5 – 2	Vietnam	Philippines	3 – 1	Malaysia
2011; Details	(Indonesia); Jakarta	Thailand	4 – 2	Vietnam	Myanmar	No playoff	Indonesia
2013; Details	(Myanmar); Naypyidaw	Thailand	5 – 0	Vietnam	Malaysia	No playoff	Indonesia
2017; Details	(Malaysia); Kuala Lumpur	Thailand	RR	Vietnam	Indonesia	RR	Malaysia
2021; Details	(Vietnam); Hà Nam	Thailand	RR	Vietnam	Malaysia	RR	Myanmar
2025; Details	(Thailand); Bangkok	Vietnam	5 – 0	Indonesia	Thailand	5 – 0	Philippines

== Medal tally ==
=== Men's tournament ===
Rank	Nation	Gold	Silver	Bronze	Total
1	Thailand	5	1	0	6
2	Indonesia	1	1	3	5
3	Vietnam	0	2	2	4
4	Malaysia	0	2	1	3
Totals (4 entries)		6	6	6	18

=== Women's tournament ===
Rank	Nation	Gold	Silver	Bronze	Total
1	Thailand	5	0	1	6
2	Vietnam	1	5	0	6
3	Indonesia	0	1	1	2
4	Malaysia	0	0	2	2
5	Myanmar	0	0	1	1
5	Philippines	0	0	1	1
Totals (6 entries)		6	6	6	18

*All teams on the same position.

== See also ==
- Football at the SEA Games
- ASEAN Futsal Championship
- ASEAN Women's Futsal Championship
