= Siti Noor Halimi Hussain =

Malaysian futsal player

Siti Noor Halimi
Personal information
- Date of birth: 22 February 1984 (age 42)
- Position: Defender

Senior career*
Years	Team	Apps	(Gls)
- FELDA United FC

International career
	Malaysia	4	(1)
- * Club domestic league appearances and goals

Siti Noor Halimi (born 22 February 1984) is a Malaysian women's international futsal player who plays as a defender. She is a member of the Malaysia women's national futsal team. She won the bronze medal at the 2013 Southeast Asian Games where she scored one goal and was part of the team at the 2015 AFC Women's Futsal Championship. On club level she played for FELDA United FC in Kuala Lumpur.
