= ASEAN Women's Futsal Championship =

Women's Futsal tournament

- Organiser(s): AFF
- Founded: 2024
- Region: Southeast Asia
- Teams: 7
- Current champions: Thailand (1st title)
- Most championships: Vietnam; Thailand (1 title)

The ASEAN Women's Futsal Championship is an international futsal tournament of the Southeast Asian nations and is sanctioned by the ASEAN Football Federation (AFF). The inaugural edition was held in 2024.

== History ==
For decades, the Southeast Asian (SEA) Games was the only outlet for the ASEAN Football Federation's women's national futsal teams to compete. In 2024, the inaugural edition of the ASEAN Women's Futsal Championship was held in the Philippines, complimenting the men's tournament which was renamed as the ASEAN Futsal Championship. The second edition is being held in Thailand which started in 24 February 2026.

== Results ==
Keys

- aet: after extra time
- p: penalty shoot-out

Ed.	Year	Host	Final			Third-place match			Num. teams
Ed.	Year	Host	(gold) Champions	Score	(silver) Runners-up	(bronze) Third place	Score	Fourth place	Num. teams
1	2024	Philippines	Vietnam	2–1 (a.e.t.)	Thailand	Indonesia	4–1	Myanmar	5
2	2026	Thailand	Thailand	5–4	Australia	Vietnam	4–1	Indonesia	7
3	2028	Myanmar							

== Performance by nations ==
As of 2026

Rank	Nation	Champions	Runners-up	Third place	Fourth place
1	Thailand	1 (2026)	1 (2024)		
2	Vietnam	1 (2024)		1 (2026)	
3	Australia		1 (2026)		
4	Indonesia			1 (2024)	1 (2026)
5	Myanmar				1 (2024)

== Medals ==
As of 2026

Rank	Nation	Gold	Silver	Bronze	Total
1	Thailand (THA)	1	1	0	2
2	Vietnam (VIE)	1	0	1	2
3	Australia (AUS)	0	1	0	1
4	Indonesia (INA)	0	0	1	1
Totals (4 entries)		2	2	2	6

== Summary ==
As of 2026

Rank	Nation	Part	M	W	D	L	GF	GA	GD	Points
1	Thailand	2	9	8	0	1	34	9	+25	24
2	Vietnam	2	10	7	0	3	31	16	+15	21
3	Australia	1	5	3	1	1	16	9	+7	10
4	Indonesia	2	9	3	1	5	20	22	−2	10
5	Philippines	2	7	1	2	4	6	20	−14	5
6	Malaysia	1	2	0	1	1	4	12	−8	1
7	Myanmar	2	8	0	1	7	9	32	−23	1

== Best players ==
As of March 2, 2026

Year	Name
2024	(Vietnam) Trịnh Nguyễn Thanh Hằng
2026	(Thailand) Darika Peanpailun

== Top goalscorers ==
As of March 2, 2026

Year	Name	Total
2024	(Vietnam) Nguyễn Phương Anh	5
2026	(Thailand) Jenjira Bubpha	5

== Best goalkeepers ==
As of March 2, 2026

Year	Name
2024	(Myanmar) Chaw Sandi Aung
2026	(Australia) Sarah Easthope

== Participating nations ==
Legend

- 1st — Champions
- 2nd — Runners-up
- 3rd — Third place
- 4th — Fourth place
- GS – Group stage
- TBD – To be determined
- × — Did not enter / Withdrew / Banned
- — Hosts

For each tournament, the flag of the host country and the number of teams in each finals tournament (in brackets) are shown.

Nation	(Philippines) 2024 (5)	(Thailand) 2026 (7)	Total
Australia	×	2nd	1
Indonesia	3rd	4th	2
Malaysia	×	GS	1
Myanmar	4th	GS	2
Philippines	GS	GS	2
Thailand	2nd	1st	2
Vietnam	1st	3rd	2

== See also ==
- ASEAN Futsal Championship
- ASEAN U-16 Futsal Championship
- AFF Futsal Club Championship
