= Futsal at the 2025 SEA Games – Women's tournament =

2025 Women's SEA Games futsal Tournament

Tournament details
- Host country: Thailand
- Dates: 12–18 December
- Teams: 6 (from 1 sub-confederation)
- Venue: 1 (in 1 host city)

Final positions
- Champions: Vietnam (1st title)
- Runners-up: Indonesia
- Third place: Thailand
- Fourth place: Philippines

Tournament statistics
- Matches played: 10
- Goals scored: 51 (5.1 per match)

The futsal tournament at the 2025 SEA Games was held in 12 to 18 December. It was the 6th edition of the women's SEA Games futsal tournament.

Thailand are the five-time defending champions, having won in five tournaments, but they have officially become former champions after losing to Indonesia in a penalty shootout in the semifinals, which marked the first time ever they failed to achieved gold medal in the tournament, as well as in their home soil.

== Schedule ==
The schedule will be as follows:

Legend
G	Group stage	1/2	Semi-finals	B	Bronze medal match	F	Gold medal match

Fri 12	Sat 13	Sun 14	Mon 15	Tue 16	Wed 17	Thu 18	
G	G	G		½		B	F

== Venues ==
Bangkok
Bangkokthonburi University Gymnasium
Capacity: 1,500
Futsal at the 2025 SEA Games – Women's tournament (Thailand)

== Draw ==
The draw was held on 19 October 2025, 13:10 ICT (UTC+7). The six teams were drawn into two groups of three teams each. The hosts Thailand were automatically seeded into Pot 1 and placed into the first position of Group A, while the remaining teams were seeded into their respective pots, based on their previous performance.

Pot 1	Pot 2	Pot 3
1. Thailand (H); 2. Vietnam	3. Myanmar; 4. Malaysia	5. Indonesia; 6. Philippines

== Squads ==
The team has to name a final squad of 14 players (two of whom must be goalkeepers).

== Group stage ==
=== Tiebreakers ===
Teams were ranked according to points (3 points for a win, 1 point for a draw, 0 points for a loss), and if tied on points, the following tiebreaking criteria were applied, in the order given, to determine the rankings:

1. Points in head-to-head matches among tied teams;
2. Goal difference in head-to-head matches among tied teams;
3. Goals scored in head-to-head matches among tied teams;
4. If more than two teams were tied, and after applying all head-to-head criteria above, a subset of teams were still tied, all head-to-head criteria above were reapplied exclusively to this subset of teams;
5. Goal difference in all group matches;
6. Goals scored in all group matches;
7. Penalty shoot-out if only two teams were tied and they met in the last round of the group;
8. Disciplinary points (yellow card = 1 point, red card as a result of two yellow cards = 3 points, direct red card = 3 points, yellow card followed by direct red card = 4 points);
9. Drawing of lots.

=== Group A ===
Pos	Team	Pld	W	D	L	GF	GA	GD	Pts	Qualification
1	Thailand (H)	2	2	0	0	13	1	+12	6	Advance to knockout stage
2	Philippines	2	1	0	1	4	8	−4	3	Advance to knockout stage
3	Malaysia	2	0	0	2	1	9	−8	0	

Source: VFF
(H) Hosts
12 December 2025
16:30

Thailand	7–1	Philippines
Arriya Saetoen 12'; Paerploy Huajaipetch 14'; Jenjira Bubpha 20'; Sasikarn Tongdee 25'; Suchanat Nakman 29'; Hataichanok Tappakun 33'; Saovapha Tranga 34'	Report	Regine Rebosora 11'

Bangkokthonburi University Gymnasium, Bangkok
Referee: Fathi Zari (Iran)

13 December 2025
16:30

Philippines	3–1	Malaysia
Dionesa Tolentin 4'; Marie Bandoja 6'; Maria Mendano 20'	Report	Farahiyah Ridzuan 19'

Bangkokthonburi University Gymnasium, Bangkok

14 December 2025
16:30

Malaysia	0–6	Thailand
	Report	Jenjira Bubpha 11'; Darika Peanpailun 17', 31'; Sangrawee Meekham 23'; Ariyya Saetoen 27'; Paerploy Huajaipetch 34'

Bangkokthonburi University Gymnasium, Bangkok
Referee: Nour Chaito (Lebanon)

=== Group B ===
Pos	Team	Pld	W	D	L	GF	GA	GD	Pts	Qualification
1	Vietnam	2	2	0	0	7	3	+4	6	Advance to knockout stage
2	Indonesia	2	1	0	1	5	3	+2	3	Advance to knockout stage
3	Myanmar	2	0	0	2	2	8	−6	0	

Source: VFF
12 December 2025
13:30

Vietnam	3–1	Indonesia
Trần Thị Thùy Trang 24'; Lê Thị Thanh Ngân 28' (pen.); Nguyễn Phương Anh 38'	Report	Olin Quisepina 39'

Bangkokthonburi University Gymnasium, Bangkok
Referee: Nurul Atikah Janah (Malaysia)

13 December 2025
13:30

Indonesia	4–0	Myanmar
Fitri Rosdiana 18'; Nisma Francida 19'; Ikeu Rosita 20', 24'	Report

Bangkokthonburi University Gymnasium, Bangkok

14 December 2025
13:30

Myanmar	2–4	Vietnam
Ei El Kyaw 11'; Khin Moe Wai 27'	Report	Nguyễn Phương Anh 17'; Lê Thị Thanh Ngân 18'; A Dắt Rin Tô 34'; Bùi Thị Trang 35'

Bangkokthonburi University Gymnasium, Bangkok
Referee: Zhu Xin (China)

== Knockout stage ==
=== Bracket ===
Semi-finals
16 December – Bangkok
Thailand	4 (6)
Indonesia (p)	4 (7)
16 December – Bangkok
Vietnam	1
Philippines	0

Gold medal match
18 December – Bangkok
Indonesia	0
Vietnam	5
Bronze medal match
18 December – Bangkok
Thailand	5
Philippines	0

=== Semi-finals ===
16 December 2025
13:30

Vietnam	1–0	Philippines
Trần Nguyệt Vi 25'	Report

Bangkokthonburi University Gymnasium, Bangkok
Referee: Gelareh Nazemi (Iran)
16 December 2025
16:30

Thailand	4–4	Indonesia
Sangrawee Meekham 8'; Darika Peanpailun 9', 18', 30'	Report	Ikeu Rosita 1', 19'; Suksen Sasiprapha 13' (o.g.); Fitri Rosdiana 35'
Penalties
Darika Peanpailun (penalty scored); Paerploy Huajaipetch (penalty missed); Jenjira Bubpha (penalty scored); Lalida Chimpabut (penalty scored); Nattamon Artkla (penalty scored); Sangrawee Meekham (penalty scored); Saovapha Tranga (penalty scored); Suchanat Nakmai (penalty missed)	6–7	(penalty missed) Novita Murni; (penalty scored) Dinar Kartika; (penalty scored) Nisma Francida; (penalty scored) Agnes Matulapelwa; (penalty scored) Fitri Rosdiana; (penalty scored) Suciana Yuliani; (penalty scored) Olin Quisepina; (penalty scored) Ikeu Rosita

Bangkokthonburi University Gymnasium, Bangkok
Referee: Nurul Atikah Janah (Malaysia)

=== Bronze medal match ===
18 December 2025
13:30

Philippines	0–5	Thailand
	Report	Ariyya Saetoen 3'; Sasikarn Tongdee 6'; Paerploy Huajaipetch 7'; Jenjira Bubpha 35'; Suchanat Nakmai 39'

Bangkokthonburi University Gymnasium, Bangkok
Referee: Zhu Xin (China)

=== Gold medal match ===
18 December 2025
16:30

Vietnam	5–0	Indonesia
Lê Thị Thanh Ngân 5', 7'; Trần Thị Thùy Trang 8'; K'Thủa 11'; Trần Nguyệt Vi 40'	Report

Bangkokthonburi University Gymnasium, Bangkok
Referee: Panadda Khotsenaphattra (Thailand)

== Final ranking ==
As per statistical convention in futsal, matches decided in extra time are counted as wins and losses, while matches decided by penalty shoot-outs are counted as draws.

Pos	Team	Pld	W	D	L	GF	GA	GD	Pts	Final result
1	Vietnam	4	4	0	0	13	3	+10	12	Gold medal
2	Indonesia	4	1	1	2	9	12	−3	4	Silver medal
3	Thailand	4	3	1	0	22	5	+17	10	Bronze medal
4	Philippines	4	1	0	3	4	14	−10	3	Fourth place
5	Myanmar	2	0	0	2	2	8	−6	0	Eliminated in group stage
6	Malaysia	2	0	0	2	1	9	−8	0	Eliminated in group stage

Source: SEA Games

== See also ==
- Men's tournament
