= K'Thủa =

Vietnamese footballer (born 2003)

Personal information
- Date of birth: 13 August 2003 (age 23)
- Place of birth: Lâm Hà, Lâm Đồng, Vietnam
- Height: 1.60 m (5 ft 3 in)
- Position: Winger

Team information
- Current team: Hồ Chí Minh City
- Number: 11

Youth career
- 2019–2020: Hồ Chí Minh City

Senior career*
| Years | Team | Apps | (Gls) |
| 2020–2024 | Hồ Chí Minh City II | | |
| 2024– | Hồ Chí Minh City I | | |

International career
| 2024– | Vietnam futsal | | |
- * Club domestic league appearances and goals

K'Thủa (born 13 August 2003) is a Vietnamese footballer who plays as a winger for V-Women's League club Hồ Chí Minh City. She also plays for the Vietnam women's national futsal team.

== Early life ==
K'Thủa was born in a poor Cơ Ho ethnic family in Lâm Đồng. She dropped out of school after the 9th grade. During a district football tournament, former Vietnam national team player Bùi Tuyết Mai was impressed by K'Thủa's performances and presented her to Hồ Chí Minh City. She then moved to the club.

== Club career ==
K'Thủa made her debut for Hồ Chí Minh City I in 2024. In March 2025, she scored a goal in Hồ Chí Minh City's historical 5–4 win against Abu Dhabi Country Club at the 2024–25 AFC Women's Champions League, helping the team advance to the semi-finals. She was therefore named as the best player of the match.

== International career ==
Besides football, K'Thủa is also a futsal player. With the Vietnam national futsal team, she won the 2024 ASEAN Women's Futsal Championship, contributing 2 goals in the campaign.

== International goals ==
=== Futsal ===
| No. | Date | Venue | Opponent | Score | Result | Competition |
|---|---|---|---|---|---|---|
| 1. | 17 November 2024 | Pasig, Philippines | Myanmar | 5–2 | 5–2 | 2024 ASEAN Women's Futsal Championship |
| 2. | 19 November 2024 | Pasig, Philippines | Philippines | 6–1 | 6–1 | 2024 ASEAN Women's Futsal Championship |
| 3. | 15 January 2025 | Yangon, Myanmar | Myanmar | 1–0 | 5–1 | 2025 AFC Women's Futsal Asian Cup qualification |
| 4. | 15 January 2025 | Yangon, Myanmar | Myanmar | 5–1 | 5–1 | 2025 AFC Women's Futsal Asian Cup qualification |
| 5. | 17 January 2025 | Yangon, Myanmar | Macau | 8–0 | 21–0 | 2025 AFC Women's Futsal Asian Cup qualification |
| 6. | 17 January 2025 | Yangon, Myanmar | Macau | 15–0 | 21–0 | 2025 AFC Women's Futsal Asian Cup qualification |
| 7. | 18 December 2025 | Bangkok, Thailand | Indonesia | 4–0 | 5–0 | 2025 SEA Games |

=== Hồ Chí Minh City ===
| No. | Date | Venue | Opponent | Score | Result | Competition |
|---|---|---|---|---|---|---|
| 1. | 22 March 2025 | Thống Nhất Stadium, Hồ Chí Minh City, Vietnam | (United Arab Emirates) Abu Dhabi Country Club | 1–3 | 5–4 | 2024–25 AFC Women's Champions League |
| 2. | 16 November 2025 | Thống Nhất Stadium, Hồ Chí Minh City, Vietnam | (Singapore) Lion City Sailors | 2–0 | 2–0 | 2025–26 AFC Women's Champions League |
