= Futsal at the 2013 SEA Games =

Tournament details
- Host country: Myanmar
- Dates: December 9–20
- Teams: 6 (men's); 5 (women's)
- Venue: 1 (in 1 host city)

Final positions
- Champions: Thailand (men); Thailand (women)
- Runners-up: Vietnam (men); Vietnam (women)
- Third place: Indonesia (men); Malaysia (women)
- Fourth place: Myanmar (men); Indonesia (women)

Tournament statistics
- Matches played: 21
- Goals scored: 135 (6.43 per match)

The futsal tournament at the 2013 SEA Games took place between December 9–20. This edition of the tournament featured both men's and women's tournaments. All matches took place in Wunna Theikdi Futsal, Naypyidaw. Official drawing took place on 6 November 2013 in Naypyitaw, Myanmar.

== Participating teams ==
Men	Women
Indonesia; Laos; Malaysia; Myanmar; Thailand; Vietnam	Indonesia; Malaysia; Myanmar; Thailand; Vietnam

== Men's tournament ==
All times are Myanmar Time – UTC+6:30.

=== Group stage ===
Key to colours in group tables
Group winners and runners-up advanced to the semi-finals

==== Group A ====
Team	Pld	W	D	L	GF	GA	GD	Pts
Indonesia	2	1	1	0	5	4	+1	4
Myanmar	2	0	2	0	4	4	0	2
Malaysia	2	0	1	1	8	9	−1	1

Source: AFF
9 December 2013
18:00

Myanmar	4 – 4	Malaysia
	Report

Wunna Theikdi Futsal, Naypyidaw

13 December 2013
18:00

Malaysia	4 – 5	Indonesia
Aula 11'; Amir 16'; Yatim 19'; Abu Haniffa 37'	SEA Games Report; AFF Report	Suwardy 3'; Saptaji 7'; Lubis 12'; Kustiawan 17'; Anza 29'

Wunna Theikdi Futsal, Naypyidaw

15 December 2013
18:00

Indonesia	0 - 0	Myanmar
	Report

Wunna Theikdi Futsal, Naypyidaw

==== Group B ====
Team	Pld	W	D	L	GF	GA	GD	Pts
Thailand	2	2	0	0	16	3	+13	6
Vietnam	2	1	0	1	10	5	+5	3
Laos	2	0	0	2	4	22	−18	0

Source: AFF
9 December 2013
15:30

Thailand	12 – 3	Laos
	Report

Wunna Theikdi Futsal, Naypyidaw

13 December 2013
15:30

Laos	1 – 10	Vietnam
	Report

Wunna Theikdi Futsal, Naypyidaw

15 December 2013
15:30

Vietnam	0 - 4	Thailand
	Report

Wunna Theikdi Futsal, Naypyidaw

=== Knockout stage ===
Semi-finals
17 December
Indonesia	1
Vietnam	3
17 December
Thailand	8
Myanmar	1

Final
20 December
Vietnam	1
Thailand	8
Third place
20 December
Indonesia	6
Myanmar	5

==== Semi-finals ====
17 December 2013
14:00

Indonesia	1 - 3	Vietnam
Suwardy 35'	SEA Games Report; AFF Report	Vu Xuan Du 13'; Ly Khanh Hung 24'; Pham Truong Luan 35'

Wunna Theikdi Futsal, Naypyidaw
17 December 2013
17:00

Thailand	8 - 1	Myanmar
	Report

Wunna Theikdi Futsal, Naypyidaw

==== Bronze medal match ====
20 December 2013
10:30

Indonesia	6 - 5	Myanmar
	Report

Wunna Theikdi Futsal, Naypyidaw

==== Gold medal match ====
20 December 2013
16:00

Vietnam	1 - 8	Thailand
	Report

Wunna Theikdi Futsal, Naypyidaw

=== Goalscorers ===
8 goals

- (Thailand) Suphawut Thueanklang

5 goals

- (Thailand) Kritsada Wongkaeo

3 goals

- (Myanmar) Pyae Phyo Maung (3)
- (Thailand) Jetsada Chudech
- (Thailand) Wiwat Thaijaroen
- (Vietnam) Khanh Hung Ly

2 goals

- (Indonesia) Ardy Suwardy
- (Laos) Kita Souksabai
- (Malaysia) Abu Haniffa
- (Thailand) Jirawat Sornwichian
- (Thailand) Piyapan Rattana
- (Vietnam) Van Vu Tran
- (Vietnam) That Phi Ton
- (Vietnam) Thanh Tuan Pham

1 goal

- (Indonesia) Bambang Saptaji
- (Indonesia) Syahidansyah Lubis
- (Indonesia) Andri Kustiawan
- (Indonesia) Anza Rizal
- (Myanmar) Aung Aung
- (Myanmar) Pyae Phyo Maung (1)
- (Malaysia) Saiful Nizam
- (Malaysia) Shamsul Akmar
- (Malaysia) Saiful Aula
- (Malaysia) Asmie Amir
- (Malaysia) Fitri Yatim
- (Thailand) Piyanat Nusaya
- (Laos) Somphone Samphaonon
- (Laos) Panida Sinthapaseuth
- (Vietnam) Hoang Vinh Tran
- (Vietnam) Quoc Nam Le
- (Vietnam) Ngoc Hao Doan
- (Vietnam) Xuan Du Vu

1 own goal

- (Myanmar) Kyaw Kyaw Tun (against Malaysia)

== Women's tournament ==
All times are Myanmar Time – UTC+6:30.

=== Group stage ===
Team	Pld	W	D	L	GF	GA	GD	Pts
Thailand	4	4	0	0	16	4	+12	12
Vietnam	4	2	1	1	13	10	+3	7
Malaysia	4	1	2	1	9	9	0	5
Indonesia	4	1	1	2	7	9	−2	4
Myanmar	4	0	0	4	5	18	−13	0

Source: AFF
10 December 2013
13:00

Thailand	4 - 0	Indonesia
	Report

Wunna Theikdi Futsal, Naypyidaw
10 December 2013
15:00

Myanmar	0 - 6	Vietnam
	Report

Wunna Theikdi Futsal, Naypyidaw

12 December 2013
13:00

Vietnam	3 - 1	Indonesia
	Report

Wunna Theikdi Futsal, Naypyidaw
12 December 2013
15:00

Myanmar	2 - 4	Malaysia
	Report

Wunna Theikdi Futsal, Naypyidaw

14 December 2013
13:00

Indonesia	1 - 1	Malaysia
	Report

Wunna Theikdi Futsal, Naypyidaw
14 December 2013
15:00

Vietnam	1 - 6	Thailand
	Report

Wunna Theikdi Futsal, Naypyidaw

16 December 2013
13:00

Malaysia	1 - 3	Thailand
	Report

Wunna Theikdi Futsal, Naypyidaw
16 December 2013
15:00

Indonesia	5 - 1	Myanmar
	Report

Wunna Theikdi Futsal, Naypyidaw

18 December 2013
13:00

Malaysia	3 - 3	Vietnam
	Report

Wunna Theikdi Futsal, Naypyidaw
18 December 2013
15:00

Thailand	3 - 2	Myanmar
	Report

Wunna Theikdi Futsal, Naypyidaw

=== Gold medal match ===
20 December 2013
13:00

Thailand	5 - 0	Vietnam
	Report

Wunna Theikdi Futsal, Naypyidaw

=== Goalscorers ===
4 goals

- (Thailand) Orathai Srimanee

3 goals

- (Vietnam) Thuy Trang Tran
- (Vietnam) Huyen Linh Vu
- (Malaysia) Hanis Farhana

2 goals

- (Thailand) Prapasporn Sriroj
- (Thailand) Darika Peanpailun
- (Thailand) Praephan Hengphio
- (Malaysia) Fatin Shahida
- (Indonesia) Darti Septiawati
- (Indonesia) Maya Muharina

1 goal

- (Thailand) Jiraprapa Nimrattanasing
- (Thailand) Sasicha Phothiwong
- (Thailand) Vasinee Pakthongchai
- (Vietnam) Chau Nguyen
- (Vietnam) Ngoc Hoa Trinh
- (Vietnam) Hai Yen Hoang
- (Indonesia) Rani Mulyasari
- (Indonesia) Maulina Novryliani
- (Indonesia) Anggi Puspita Sari
- (Malaysia) Siti Noor Halimi
- (Myanmar) Shwe Zin Aung
- (Myanmar) Nan Khan Mo
- (Myanmar) Thu Zar Htwe

1 own goal

- (Myanmar) Khin Mar Lin (against Vietnam)

== Medal winners ==
Event	Gold	Silver	Bronze
Men's Division	Thailand (THA); Asming Talek; Konghla Lakka; Piyapan Ratana; Jirawat Sornwichian; Kritsada Wongkaeo; Jetsada Chudech; Suphawut Thueanklang; Sakchai Hamaitree; Chaivat Jamgrajang; Wiwat Thaijaroen; Saharat Inpan; Nawin Rattanawongswas; Piyanat Nusaya; Atirat Sittisak	Vietnam (VIE); Phuoc Anh Dang; Xuan Du Vu; Quoc Nam Le; Trong Thien Nguyen; Khanh Hung Ly; Hoang Vinh Tran; Trong Luan Pham; Thanh Tuan Pham; Bao Quan Nguyen; Van Vu Tran; Thanh Dat Pham; Buu Phuoc Tran; Ngoc Hao Doan; That Phi Ton	Indonesia (INA); Mohamad Syaldi Aulia Gozali; Nur Ali; Renaldi; Ade Andyka; Fhandy Permana; Andri Ansyah Agustin; Andri Kustiawan; Ardy D W Suardy; Bambang Ayu Saptaji; Julinur Hafid; Asep Irwan; Ivan Cahyadi; Anza Rizal Restu Anmas; Syah Dansyah Lubis
Women's Division	Thailand (THA); Sasicha Suksen; Pannipa Juijaroen; Praephan Hengphio; Vasinee Pakthongchai; Hataichanok Tappakun; Jiraprapa Tupsuri; Pacharaporn Srimuang; Orathai Srimanee; Jiraprapa Nimrattanasing; Siranya Srimanee; Prapasporn Sriroj; Pannipa Kamolrat; Darika Peanpailun; Sasicha Phothiwong	Vietnam (VIE); Kim Ngan Truong; Thi Le Thu Nguyen; Ngoc Hoa Trinh; Thuy An Bui; Thi Thu Hien Ho; Thi Chau Nguyen; Thi Tuoi Pham; Thi Thuy Trang Tran; Thi Thuy Vu; Thi Thanh Nguyen; Thi Lan Nguyen; Thi Huyen Linh Vu; Thi Hue Pham; Thi Hai Yen Hoang	Malaysia (MAS); Noorhayanti Mohd Salleh; Farah Najihah Abdul Aziz; Siti Noor Halimi Hussain; Norhawa Md Yasin; Farhana Abdullah; Nur Shazreen Munazli; Farahiyah Muhamad Ridzuan; Nur Izzati Khairudin; Steffi Sarge Kaur Sergeant Singh; Fatin Shahida Azmi; Noor Asyikin Mohamad Noor; Felicia Adele Ng; Amirah Sarah Mohd Fahmi; Hanis Farhana Shamsul Azizan
