= 2024 ASEAN Women's Futsal Championship =

Southeast Asian inaugural women's futsal competition

Kampeonato ng Futsal ng Kababaihan ng ASEAN 2024

Tournament details
- Host country: Philippines
- City: Pasig
- Dates: November 16–21
- Teams: 5 (from 1 sub-confederation)
- Venue: 1 (in 1 host city)

Final positions
- Champions: Vietnam (1st title)
- Runners-up: Thailand
- Third place: Indonesia
- Fourth place: Myanmar

Tournament statistics
- Matches played: 12
- Goals scored: 55 (4.58 per match)
- Top scorer: (Vietnam) Nguyễn Phương Anh (5 goals)
- Best player: (Vietnam) Trịnh Nguyễn Thanh Hằng
- Best goalkeeper: (Myanmar) Chaw Sandi Aung

The 2024 ASEAN Women's Futsal Championship (Filipino: Kampeonato ng Futsal ng Kababaihan ng ASEAN 2024) was the inaugural edition of the ASEAN Women's Futsal Championship. It was hosted by Philippines from November 16 to 21 in Pasig, Philippines. Vietnam became the inaugural champion.

== Format ==
All five participating teams are playing a single round robin after which the first and second placed team will play in the final, and the third and fourth placed team will figure in a third-place play-off.

== Draw ==
The draw for the tournament was held on October 21, 2024. There was only one single group. Five participating teams, excluding the host are placed in a single pot. The host country, Philippines, are automatically placed in A1, while the rest of the teams are drawn into random positions (A2–A6). Ranking is as of October 11, 2024.

Pot 1	Host
Thailand (6); Vietnam (11); Indonesia (24); Myanmar (37)	Philippines (59) (H)

== Venue ==
Pasig	2024 ASEAN Women's Futsal Championship (Luzon)
PhilSports Arena	2024 ASEAN Women's Futsal Championship (Luzon)
Capacity: 10,000	2024 ASEAN Women's Futsal Championship (Luzon)

== Group stage ==
All times are local, PST (UTC+8)

Pos	Team	Pld	W	D	L	GF	GA	GD	Pts	Qualification
1	Thailand	4	4	0	0	13	1	+12	12	Final
2	Vietnam	4	3	0	1	16	6	+10	9	Final
3	Indonesia	4	2	0	2	9	7	+2	6	Third place play-off
4	Myanmar	4	0	1	3	5	16	−11	1	Third place play-off
5	Philippines (H)	4	0	1	3	4	17	−13	1	

Source: AFF
(H) Hosts
November 16, 2024
16:00

Indonesia	0–1	Thailand
	Report	Darika 36'

PhilSports Arena, Pasig
November 16, 2024
19:00

Philippines	2–2	Myanmar
Bandoja 12'; Danton 33'	Report	Lwin Lwin Thet 24'; Yun Me Me Lwin 32'

PhilSports Arena, Pasig

November 17, 2024
16:00

Myanmar	2–5	Vietnam
Nang Seng Brim 9'; Sett Nwe Ni 16'	Report	Trịnh Nguyễn Thanh Hằng 3'; Nguyễn Phương Anh 21'; Biện Thị Hằng 26'; Lê Thị Thanh Ngân 33' (pen.); K'Thủa 39'

PhilSports Arena, Pasig
November 17, 2024
19:00

Thailand	7–0	Philippines
Sangrawee 6', 29'; Sawitree 8'; Paerploy 13'; Arriya 17'; Lalida 24'; Nattamon 40'	Report

PhilSports Arena, Pasig

November 18, 2024
16:00

Vietnam	5–0	Indonesia
Nguyễn Phương Anh 1'; Bùi Thị Trang 5', 6'; Biện Thị Hằng 12'; Lê Thị Thanh Ngân 38'	Report

PhilSports Arena, Pasig
November 18, 2024
19:00

Myanmar	1–2	Thailand
Yun Me Me Lwin 34'	Report	Sangrawee 23'; Arriya 35'

PhilSports Arena, Pasig

November 19, 2024
16:00

Indonesia	7–0	Myanmar
Sundari 11'; Hendrita 14'; Rosdiana 16', 21'; Rosita 23'; Sari 30'; Matulapelwa 33'	Report

PhilSports Arena, Pasig
November 19, 2024
19:00

Vietnam	6–1	Philippines
Trần Thị Lan Mai 13', 28'; Lê Thị Thanh Ngân 21'; Nguyễn Phương Anh 26'; Trần Thị Thu Xuân 29'; K'Thủa 32'	Report	Del Campo 25'

PhilSports Arena, Pasig

November 20, 2024
16:00

Thailand	3–0	Vietnam
Arriya 16'; Sangrawee 17'; Nattamon 26'	Report

PhilSports Arena, Pasig
November 20, 2024
19:00

Philippines	1–2	Indonesia
Bandoja 12'	Report	Hendrita 7'; Rusdiana 39'

PhilSports Arena, Pasig

== Knockout stage ==
=== Bracket ===
Final
November 21 – Pasig
Thailand	1
Vietnam (a.e.t.)	2
Third place play-off
November 21 – Pasig
Indonesia	4
Myanmar	1

=== Third place play-off ===
November 21, 2024
16:00

Indonesia	4–1	Myanmar
Phu Pwint Khaing 2' (o.g.); Sari 7'; Rosdiana 25'; Karath 30'	Report	Wutt Yee Lwin 28'

PhilSports Arena, Pasig

=== Final ===
November 21, 2024
19:00

Thailand	1–2 (a.e.t.)	Vietnam
Lê Thị Thanh Ngân 46' (o.g.)	Report	Nguyễn Phương Anh 43', 47'

PhilSports Arena, Pasig

== Winners ==
ASEAN Women's Futsal Championship

Vietnam
1st title

== Awards ==
- Most Valuable Player
  - (Vietnam) Trịnh Nguyễn Thanh Hằng
- Top Goalscorer
  - (Vietnam) Nguyễn Phương Anh (5 goals)
- Best Goalkeeper
  - (Myanmar) Chaw Sandi Aung

== See also ==
- 2024 ASEAN Futsal Championship
