= Guam women's national futsal team =

Guam
- Association: Guam Football Association
- Confederation: AFC (Asia)
- Head coach: Ross Awa
- FIFA code: GUM
- FIFA ranking: 54 (24 September 2026)
- Highest FIFA ranking: 58 (October 2024)
- Lowest FIFA ranking: 60 (May–June 2024)

First international
- Philippines 0–1 Guam (Manila, Philippines; 15 October 2022)

Biggest win
- Philippines 0–1 Guam (Manila, Philippines; 15 October 2022)

Biggest defeat
- Philippines 3–1 Guam (Manila, Philippines; 16 October 2022)'

FIFA World Cup
- Appearances: 0

AFC Women's Futsal Championship
- Appearances: 0

The Guam women's national futsal team represents Guam in international futsal competitions and is controlled by the Guam Football Association. They are affiliated to the Asian Football Confederation and the East Asian Football Federation.

== History ==
The Guam women's national futsal team had its first ever international friendlies in 2022. It took part in the Pinay5 Futsal Faceoff series from 15 to 16 October in Manila, Philippines where they played against a newly reformed Philippine national team. The Guam team which officially began training back in August 2022 is led by coach Ross Awa. Guam emerged victorious against the Philippines in their first ever international. Koharu Minato bagged a goal in the 35th minute in Guam's 1–0 win over the hosts. However, they lost the second game 1–3.

== Fixtures and results ==
Legend

Win Draw Lose Fixture

== Coaches ==
- (Guam) Ross Awa (2022–)
