= Thailand women's national futsal team =

Thailand
- Shirt badge/Association crest
- Nickname(s): โต๊ะเล็กสาว (The Small Table Girl)
- Association: Football Association of Thailand
- Confederation: AFC (Asia)
- Head coach: Tanatorn Santanaprasit
- Captain: Orathai Srimanee
- FIFA code: THA
- FIFA ranking: 7 (24 September 2026)
- Highest FIFA ranking: 5 (4 April 2025)
Home colours	Away colours	Third colours

First international
- Philippines 1–8 Thailand (Bangkok, Thailand; 13 November 2005)

Biggest win
- Thailand 17 – 0 Malaysia (Macau; 28 October 2007)

Biggest defeat
- Brazil 14 – 0 Thailand (Alcobendas, Spain; 8 December 2010)

FIFA Futsal Women's World Cup
- Appearances: 1 (First in 2025)
- Best result: Group stage (2025)

AFC Women's Futsal Asian Cup
- Appearances: 3 (First in 2015)
- Best result: 2nd place, (2025)

ASEAN Women's Futsal Championship
- Appearances: 2 (First in 2024)
- Best result: Champions (2026)

The Thailand women's national futsal team represents Thailand in international futsal competitions and is controlled by the Football Association of Thailand.

== Results and fixtures ==
Legend

Win Draw Lose Fixtures

11 November 2025 Friendly	Thailand	3–2	New Zealand	Nakhon Ratchasima, Thailand
18:00 UTC+7:00	Darika 8'; Paerploy 16', 34'		Evans 22'; Bremner 35'	Stadium: Terminal 21

15 November 2025 Friendly	Thailand	0–7	Brazil	Nakhon Ratchasima, Thailand
18:00 UTC+7:00			Emilly 2', 3', 13'; Natalinha 5'; Luana 6'; Lucileia 12'; Simone 23'	Stadium: Terminal 21

22 November 2025 2025 FIFA Futsal Women's World Cup	Spain	5–2	Thailand	Pasig, Philippines
19:30 UTC+8:00	Sotelo 6'08"; I. Córdoba 10'26"; L. Córdoba 15'11", 27'34"; Navarro 31'11"	Report	Jenjira 8'18"; Sasikarn 13'51"	Stadium: PhilSports Arena; Attendance: 759; Referee: Kimberly Valverde (Costa Rica)

25 November 2025 2025 FIFA Futsal Women's World Cup	Canada	3–6	Thailand	Pasig, Philippines
18:00 UTC+8:00	Gosselin 8'13"; Sasikarn 12'26" (o.g.); Lagacé 22'39"	Report	Darika 1'58", 3'58", 24'01"; Sangrawee 19'53"; Arriya 29'43"; Jenjira 31'38"	Stadium: PhilSports Arena; Attendance: 307; Referee: María Pinto (Argentina)

28 November 2025 2025 FIFA Futsal Women's World Cup	Thailand	1–4	Colombia	Pasig, Philippines
18:00 UTC+8:00	Arriya 10'22"	Report	Celis 3'59"; Salcedo 7'25", 22'31"; Rodríguez 34'45"	Stadium: PhilSports Arena; Attendance: 404; Referee: Marijana Orešić (Croatia)

12 December 2025 2025 SEA Games	Thailand	7–1	Philippines	Bangkok, Thailand
16:30 UTC+7:00	Arriya 12'; Paerploy 14'; Jenjira 20'; Sasikarn 25'; Suchanat 29'; Hataichanok 33'; Saovapha 34'	Report	Rebosora 11'	Stadium: Bangkokthonburi University Gymnasium; Referee: Fathi Zari (Iran)

14 December 2025 2025 SEA Games	Malaysia	0–6	Thailand	Bangkok, Thailand
16:30 UTC+7:00		Report	Jenjira 11'; Darika 17', 31'; Sangrawee 23'; Ariyya 27'; Paerploy 34'	Stadium: Bangkokthonburi University Gymnasium; Referee: Nour Chaito (Lebanon)

16 December 2025 2025 SEA Games Semi-final	Thailand	4–4 (a.e.t.) (6–7 p)	Indonesia	Bangkok, Thailand
16:30 UTC+7:00	Sangrawee 8'; Darika 9', 18', 30'	Report	Rosita 1', 19'; Suksen 13' (o.g.); Rosdiana 35'	Stadium: Bangkokthonburi University Gymnasium; Referee: Nurul Atikah Janah (Malaysia)

18 December 2025 2025 SEA Games Bronze medal	Philippines	0–5	Thailand	Bangkok, Thailand
13:30 UTC+7:00		Report	Ariyya 3'; Sasikarn 6'; Paerploy 7'; Jenjira 35'; Suchanat 39'	Stadium: Bangkokthonburi University Gymnasium; Referee: Zhu Xin (China)

=== 2026 ===
24 February 2026 2026 ASEAN Women's Futsal Championship	Thailand	3–0	Indonesia	Nakhon Ratchasima, Thailand
18:30 UTC+7:00	Panwasa 12'; Jenjira 20'; Darika 23'	Report		Stadium: Terminal 21 Korat; Referee: Reem Al-Bishi (Saudi Arabia)

26 February 2026 2026 ASEAN Women's Futsal Championship	Malaysia	0–8	Thailand	Nakhon Ratchasima, Thailand
18:30 UTC+7:00		Report	Darika 3'; Suchanat 5', 28'; Arriya 11'; Sangrawee 32'; Jenjira 33'; Paerploy 37', 40'	Stadium: Terminal 21 Korat; Referee: Moe Win (Myanmar)

28 February 2026 2026 ASEAN Women's Futsal Championship Semi-final	Thailand	4–2	Vietnam	Nakhon Ratchasima, Thailand
18:30 UTC+7:00	Nattamon 4'; Jenjira 11', 33'; Arriya 34'	Report	Trần Thị Thu Xuân 2'; Lê Thị Thanh Ngân 36'	Stadium: Terminal 21 Korat; Referee: Mohd Norafendy Norhayalan (Malaysia)

24 February 2026 2026 ASEAN Women's Futsal Championship Final	Australia	4–5	Thailand	Nakhon Ratchasima, Thailand
18:30 UTC+7:00	Holder 17'; Asiprapha 23' (o.g.); Karrys-Stahl 24'; Nattamon 40' (o.g.)		Sangrawee 5'; Jenjira 19'; Darika 31', 35', 36'	Stadium: Terminal 21 Korat

== Coaching staff ==
Name	Role
Head Coach	Tanatorn Santanaprasit
Assistant Coach	Thailand
Goalkeeping Coach	Thailand
Fitness Trainer	Thailand
Technical Director	Thailand
Physiotherapists	Thailand Thailand
Doctor	Thailand

== Players ==
=== Current squad ===
- The following players were named on date month year for the 2015 AFC Women's Futsal Championship.
- Caps and goals accurate up to and including date month year.

Number	Position	Name
1	GK	Pannipa Kamolrat
2	GK	Pannipa Juijaroen
12	GK	Sasiprapha Suksen
3		Sawitree Mamyalee
4	DF	Nipaporn Sriwarom
5	DF	Hataichanok Tappakun
6	DF	Jiraprapa Tupsuri (c)
7		Pacharaporn Srimuang
8		Pisayaporn Mokthaisong
9		Jiraprapa Nimrattanasing
10	DF	Siranya Srimanee
11	FW	Prapasporn Sriroj
13	FW	Darika Peanpailun
14	FW	Sasicha Phothiwong

== Competitive record ==
=== FIFA Futsal Women's World Cup ===
FIFA Futsal Women's World Cup record
Year	Round	GP	W	D	L	GS	GA
(Philippines) 2025	Group Stage	3	1	0	2	9	12
Total	1/1	3	1	0	2	9	12

=== Women's Futsal World Tournament ===
Women's Futsal World Tournament record
Year	Round	Position	GP	W	D	L	GS	GA
(Spain) 2010	Group stage	7/8	3	0	1	2	4	23
(Brazil) 2011	did not enter	–	–	–	–	–	–	–
(Portugal) 2012	did not enter	–	–	–	–	–	–	–
(Spain) 2013	did not enter	–	–	–	–	–	–	–
(Costa Rica) 2014	did not enter	–	–	–	–	–	–	–
(Guatemala) 2015	did not enter	–	–	–	–	–	–	–
Total	Group stage	1/6	3	0	1	2	4	23

=== AFC Women's Futsal Asian Cup ===
AFC Women's Futsal Asian Cup record
Year	Round	Position	GP	W	D	L	GS	GA
(Malaysia) 2015	Third place	3/8	5	3	0	2	11	7
(Thailand) 2018	Third place	3/15	6	3	2	1	31	4
(Kuwait) 2020	Cancelled due to COVID-19 pandemic							
(China) 2025	Runners-up	2/12	6	4	2	0	18	8
Total	Runners-up	3/3	17	10	4	3	60	19

=== Asian Indoor and Martial Arts Games ===
Asian Indoor and Martial Arts Games record
Year	Round	Position	GP	W	D	L	GS	GA
(Thailand) 2005	Runners-up	2/4	4	2	0	2	21	15
(Macau) 2007	Runners-up	2/7	5	3	1	1	31	8
(Vietnam) 2009	Third place	3/7	5	4	0	1	25	12
(South Korea) 2013	Third place	3/9	6	4	0	2	22	7
(Turkmenistan) 2017	Champions	1/7	4	4	0	0	25	3
Total	Champions	5/5	24	17	1	6	124	45

=== ASEAN Women's Futsal Championship ===
ASEAN Women's Futsal Championship record
Year	Round	Position	GP	W	D	L	GS	GA
(Philippines) 2024	Runners-up	2/5	5	4	0	1	15	3
(Thailand) 2026	Champions	1/7	4	4	0	0	20	6
Total	Runners-up	2/2	9	8	0	1	35	9

=== Southeast Asian Games ===
Southeast Asian Games record
Year	Round	Position	GP	W	D	L	GS	GA
(Thailand) 2007	Champions	1/6	4	3	1	0	18	2
(Laos) 2009	No competition as not officially selected by host							
(Indonesia) 2011	Champions	1/5	5	5	0	0	35	12
(Myanmar) 2013	Champions	1/5	5	5	0	0	21	4
(Singapore) 2015	No competition as not officially selected by host							
(Malaysia) 2017	Champions	1/5	4	3	1	0	27	5
(Philippines) 2019	No competition as not officially selected by host							
(Vietnam) 2021	Champions	1/4	3	3	0	0	10	1
(Cambodia) 2023	No competition as not officially selected by host							
(Thailand) 2025	Third place	3/6	4	3	1	0	22	5
Total	Champions	6/6	25	22	3	0	133	29

=== Thailand Friendly Cup ===
Year	Rank	M	W	D	L	GF	GA	Ref
(Thailand) 2022	-	0	0	0	0	0	0	
(Thailand) 2023	-	0	0	0	0	0	0	
Total	2/2	0	0	0	0	0	0	-

== See also ==
- Thailand national men's futsal team
- Thailand Futsal League
