= Nguyễn Thị Thành =

Vietnamese footballer

Personal information
- Date of birth: 20 November 1986 (age 39)
- Place of birth: Thanh Trì, Hanoi, Vietnam
- Height: 1.53 m (5 ft 0 in)
- Position: Midfielder

Senior career*
Years	Team	Apps	(Gls)
2002–2015	Hà Tây	117	(48)

International career
2004–2013	Vietnam	82	(31)
2014–	Vietnam (futsal)	39	(12)
- * Club domestic league appearances and goals

Nguyễn Thị Thành (born 20 November 1986) is a Vietnamese former footballer who played as a midfielder. She has been a member of the Vietnam women's national team.

== International career ==
Nguyễn capped for Vietnam at senior level during the 2010 AFC Women's Asian Cup.
