= Vietnam women's national futsal team =

Vietnam
- Shirt badge/Association crest
- Association: Vietnam Football Federation (VFF)
- Confederation: AFC (Asia)
- Head coach: Huỳnh Thị Thanh Khiết
- Captain: Ngô Nguyễn Thùy Linh
- Home stadium: Various
- FIFA code: VIE
- FIFA ranking: 11 (24 September 2026)
- Highest FIFA ranking: 11 (October 2024, April 2025, August 2025)
- Lowest FIFA ranking: 13 (May – June 2024)
Home colours	Away colours

First international
- Vietnam 4–4 Uzbekistan (Macau, China; 27 October 2007)

Biggest win
- Macau 0–21 Vietnam (Yangon, Myanmar; 17 January 2025)

Biggest defeat
- Vietnam 0–6 Russia (Ho Chi Minh City, Vietnam; 8 November 2024)

AFC Women's Futsal Asian Cup
- Appearances: 3 (First in 2015)
- Best result: Fourth place (2018)

ASEAN Women's Futsal Championship
- Appearances: 2 (First in 2024)
- Best result: Champions (2024)

The Vietnam women's national futsal team (Vietnamese: Đội tuyển Futsal nữ Việt Nam) represents Vietnam in international women's futsal. The team is controlled by the Futsal Commission of the Vietnam Football Federation and competes in AFC (Asia and Australian continent).

== History ==
Preparing for the 2007 Asian Indoor Games from October 26 to November 3 in Macau, the Vietnamese futsal women's squad assembled in Thành Long Sports Centre, Ho Chi Minh City with 16 players. Veterans from the 11-a-side team who have won the SEA Games gold medal three times are included in this list, including Luu Ngoc Mai, Phung Thi Minh Nguyet, Nguyen Hong Phuc, and Nguyen Thi Ha. The squad had its debut international encounter against Uzbekistan in Macau. At the 2007 Asian Indoor Games, the team ended in 4th place. Vietnamese women futsal have competed in two more Asian Indoor Games in 2009 and 2013, both halted at the group stage. Fulsal Vietnam women competed in three Sea Games earning silver medals in 2007, 2011, and 2013. With the Southeast Asian Women's Futsal Championship, Vietnam won the 2013 tournament held in Myanmar. On September 30, they were beaten 2–5 by Thailand in the elimination match, but won the final 4–3 on October 3, 2013. This is the first time, Vietnamese women's futsal in particular and Vietnamese futsal in general defeated Thailand to win Southeast Asia

After they qualified for the 2025 AFC Women's Futsal Asian Cup by topping the group table from Group D, Vietnam topped the group table by winning against Hong Kong, Philippines and drew Iran, thus advancing to the quarter-finals. However, Vietnam lost 0–2 against Japan, thus failing to qualify for the 2025 FIFA Futsal Women's World Cup.

== Results and fixtures ==
The following is a list of match results in the last 12 months, as well as any future matches that have been scheduled.

Win Draw Lose Fixtures

=== 2025 ===
30 November Friendly	China	2–2	Vietnam	Hangzhou, China
--:-- UTC+8	?; ?	Report	Trần Thị Hải Yến; Trần Thị Thu Xuân

2 December Friendly	China	1–2	Vietnam	Hangzhou, China
--:-- UTC+8	? 33'	Report	Bùi Thị Trang 19'; Lê Thị Thanh Ngân 20'

12 December Futsal at the 2025 SEA Games – Women's tournament	Vietnam	3–1	Indonesia	Bangkok, Thailand
13:30 UTC+7	Trần Thị Thùy Trang 24'; Lê Thị Thanh Ngân 28' (pen.); Nguyễn Phương Anh 38'	Report	Olin Quisepina 39'	Stadium: Bangkokthonburi University Gymnasium; Referee: Nurul Atikah Janah (Malaysia)

14 December Futsal at the 2025 SEA Games – Women's tournament	Myanmar	2–4	Vietnam	Bangkok, Thailand
13:30 UTC+7	Ei El Kyaw 11'; Khin Moe Wai 27'	Report	Nguyễn Phương Anh 17'; Lê Thị Thanh Ngân 18'; A Dắt Rin Tô 34'; Bùi Thị Trang 35'	Stadium: Bangkokthonburi University Gymnasium; Referee: Zhu Xin (China)

16 December Futsal at the 2025 SEA Games – Women's tournament	Vietnam	1–0	Philippines	Bangkok, Thailand
13:30 UTC+7	Trần Nguyệt Vi 25'	Report		Stadium: Bangkokthonburi University Gymnasium; Referee: Gelareh Nazemi (Iran)

18 December Futsal at the 2025 SEA Games – Women's tournament	Indonesia	0–5	Vietnam	Bangkok, Thailand
16:30 UTC+7		Report	Lê Thị Thanh Ngân 5', 7'; Trần Thị Thùy Trang 8'; K'Thủa 11'; Trần Nguyệt Vi 40'	Stadium: Bangkokthonburi University Gymnasium; Referee: Panadda Khotsenaphattra (Thailand)

=== 2026 ===
24 February ASEAN Championship GS	Vietnam	0–2	Australia	Nakhon Ratchasima, Thailand
13:30 UTC+7		Report	Fruscalzo 23'; Fazzari 39'	Stadium: Terminal 21 Korat, Nakhon Ratchasima; Referee: Tita Rosita (Indonesia)

25 February ASEAN Championship GS	Philippines	0–2	Vietnam	Nakhon Ratchasima, Thailand
13:30 UTC+7		Report	Lê Thị Thanh Ngân 5'; Biện Thị Hằng 37'	Stadium: Terminal 21 Korat, Nakhon Ratchasima; Referee: Misaki Kawamorita (Japan)

26 February ASEAN Championship GS	Vietnam	5–2	Myanmar	Nakhon Ratchasima, Thailand
13:30 UTC+7	Trần Nguyệt Vi 17', 21'; Biện Thị Hằng 22', 26', 39'	Report	Ya Min Thant Zin 8'; Lwin Lwin Htet 17'	Stadium: Terminal 21 Korat; Referee: Mohd Norafendy Norhayalan (Malaysia)

28 February ASEAN Championship SF	Thailand	4–2	Vietnam	Nakhon Ratchasima, Thailand
18:30 UTC+7	Nattamon 4'; Jenjira 11', 33'; Arriya 34'	Report	Trần Thị Thu Xuân 2'; Lê Thị Thanh Ngân 36'	Stadium: Terminal 21 Korat

2 March ASEAN Championship 3rd	Vietnam	4–1	Indonesia	Nakhon Ratchasima, Thailand
15:00 UTC+7	Lê Thị Thanh Ngân 24'; Trần Thị Thùy Trang 26'; Biện Thị Hằng 27'; Nguyễn Phương Anh 38'		Nisma Rusdiana 21'	Stadium: Terminal 21 Korat; Referee: Panadda Khotsenaphattra (Thailand)

12 November Friendly	Vietnam	2–3	New Zealand	Ho Chi Minh City, Vietnam
--:-- UTC+7		Report		Stadium: Chánh Hưng Ward Arena

14 November Friendly	Vietnam	4–2	New Zealand	Ho Chi Minh City, Vietnam
--:-- UTC+7		Report		Stadium: Chánh Hưng Ward Arena

19 November Friendly	Vietnam	1–4	Russia	Ho Chi Minh City, Vietnam
--:-- UTC+7		Report		Stadium: Chánh Hưng Ward Arena

21 November Friendly	Vietnam	2–5	Russia	Ho Chi Minh City, Vietnam
--:-- UTC+7		Report		Stadium: Chánh Hưng Ward Arena

== Coaching staff ==
Position	Name
Coach	(Vietnam) Huỳnh Thị Thanh Khiết
Assistant coach	(Vietnam) Nguyễn Hoàng An (Vietnam) Trần Văn Vũ
Physiotherapist	(Vietnam) Bùi Thị Hoài (Vietnam) Nguyễn Văn Nu
Doctor	(Vietnam) Lương Thị Hiền
Team manager	(Vietnam) Trần Anh Minh

=== Managerial history ===
- (Thailand) Khumron Sumranphun (2007)
- (Thailand) Somjit Wanwong (2009)
- (Vietnam) Trương Quốc Tuấn (2011–2013)
- (Thailand) Rakphol Sainetngam (2013)
- (Vietnam) Trương Quốc Tuấn (2015–2022)
- (Vietnam) Nguyễn Đình Hoàng (2024–2026)
- (Vietnam) Huỳnh Thị Thanh Khiết (2026–present)

== Players ==
=== Current squad ===
The following 20 players were named in the final squad for the 2026 ASEAN Women's Futsal Championship.

No.	Pos.	Player	Date of birth (age)	Club
	GK	Ngô Nguyễn Thùy Linh	21 September 1991 (age 35)	(Vietnam Football Federation) Thái Sơn Nam HCMC
	GK	Đinh Nguyễn Ngọc Linh	6 March 1999 (age 27)	(Vietnam Football Federation) Thái Sơn Nam HCMC
	GK	Nguyễn Thị Kim Phương		(Vietnam Football Federation) Thái Sơn Nam HCMC
	GK	Trần Thị Trang		(Vietnam Football Federation) Phong Phú Hà Nam
	DF	Nguyễn Thị Vân Anh	13 August 1996 (age 30)	(Vietnam Football Federation) Thái Sơn Nam HCMC
	DF	Trần Thị Thùy Trang	8 August 1988 (age 38)	(Vietnam Football Federation) Hồ Chí Minh City
	DF	A Dắt Rin Tô		(Vietnam Football Federation) Thái Sơn Nam HCMC
	DF	Nguyễn Phương Anh	1999	(Vietnam Football Federation) Thái Sơn Nam HCMC
	MF	Trần Nguyệt Vi	22 September 1999 (age 27)	(Vietnam Football Federation) Thái Sơn Nam HCMC
	MF	Lê Thị Thanh Ngân	8 April 2001 (age 25)	(Vietnam Football Federation) Thái Sơn Nam HCMC
	MF	Biện Thị Hằng	9 August 1996 (age 30)	(Vietnam Football Federation) Hà Nội
	MF	Trần Thị Lan Mai	1999	(Vietnam Football Federation) Phong Phú Hà Nam
	FW	Vũ Thị Hoa		(Vietnam Football Federation) Phong Phú Hà Nam
	FW	Trần Thị Thu Xuân	21 December 2002 (age 23)	(Vietnam Football Federation) Than KSVN
	FW	K'Thủa	13 August 2003 (age 23)	(Vietnam Football Federation) Hồ Chí Minh City
	FW	Bùi Thị Trang	10 November 1997 (age 29)	(Vietnam Football Federation) Thái Sơn Nam HCMC
		Đinh Thị Ngọc Hân	2000 (age 25–26)	(Vietnam Football Federation) Thái Sơn Nam HCMC
		Lâm Thị Xuân		(Vietnam Football Federation) Thái Sơn Nam HCMC
		Đỗ Thị Ánh Mỹ		(Vietnam Football Federation) Hà Nội
		Đào Thị Ngân		(Vietnam Football Federation) Phong Phú Hà Nam
		Nguyễn Thị Thuỳ Linh		(Vietnam Football Federation) Phong Phú Hà Nam
		Nguyễn Phương Anh		(Vietnam Football Federation) Phong Phú Hà Nam

=== Recent call-ups ===
The following players have also been called up to the Vietnam squad within the last 12 months.

Pos.	Player	Date of birth (age)	Caps	Goals	Club	Latest call-up
GK	Trần Thị Hải Yến	1998	-	-	(Vietnam) Phong Phú Hà Nam	2025 SEA Games
MF	Phó Ngọc Thanh Thy	22 November 1999 (age 26)	-	-	(Vietnam) Thái Sơn Nam HCMC	2025 SEA Games^{PRE}
DF	Nguyễn Thị Tú Anh	2002	-	-	(Vietnam) Hà Nội	China training camp, November 2025^{PRE}
	Nguyễn Vân Anh		-	-	(Vietnam) Thái Sơn Nam HCMC	2025 SEA Games^{PRE}
	Lê Trần Tuyết Mai		-	-	(Vietnam) Thái Sơn Nam HCMClatest=2025 SEA Games^{PRE}	
	Nguyễn Huỳnh Như		-	-	(Vietnam) Hồ Chí Minh City	China training camp, November 2025^{PRE}
Notes: ^{INJ} Player withdrew from the squad due to an injury.; ^{PRE} Preliminary squad.; ^{RET} Retired from the national team.; ^{WD} Player withdrew from the squad for non-injury related reasons.

== Competitive record ==
=== FIFA Futsal Women's World Cup ===
FIFA Futsal Women's World Cup record
Year	Result	Pos.	Pld	W	D	L	GF	GA
(Philippines) 2025	Did not qualify							
2029	To be determined							
Total	–	0/1	0	0	0	0	0	0

=== Women's Futsal World Tournament ===
Women's Futsal World Tournament record
Year	Result	Pos.	Pld	W	D	L	GF	GA
(Spain) 2010	Did not enter							
(Brazil) 2011	Did not enter							
(Portugal) 2012	Did not enter							
(Spain) 2013	Did not enter							
(Costa Rica) 2014	Did not enter							
(Guatemala) 2015	Did not enter							
Total		0/6	0	0	0	0	0	0

=== AFC Women's Futsal Asian Cup ===
AFC Women's Futsal Asian Cup record									Qualification record							
Year	Result	Pos.	Pld	W	D	L	GF	GA	Outcome	Pld	W	D	L	GF	GA	—
(Malaysia) 2015	Group stage	8th	3	0	0	3	5	9	2009 and 2013 Asian Indoor and Martial Arts Games							
(Thailand) 2018	Fourth place	4th	6	4	1	1	13	7	No qualification							
(Kuwait) ~~2020~~	Canceled due to COVID-19 pandemic								Canceled due to COVID-19 pandemic							
(China) 2025	Quarter-finals	5th	4	2	1	1	8	5	1st of 4	2	2	1	0	28	3	2025
(Myanmar) 2028	To be determined								To be determined							
Total	Fourth place	3/3	13	6	2	5	26	21	1st	2	2	1	0	28	3	—

AFC Women's Futsal Asian Cup history
Year	Round	Opponent	Score	Result	Venue
2015	Group stage	Japan	2–4	Loss	Nilai, Malaysia
2015	Group stage	China	2–3	Loss	Nilai, Malaysia
2015	Group stage	Thailand	1–2	Loss	Nilai, Malaysia
2018	Group stage	Chinese Taipei	1–0	Won	Bangkok, Thailand
2018	Group stage	Bangladesh	7–0	Won	Bangkok, Thailand
2018	Group stage	Malaysia	3–1	Won	Bangkok, Thailand
2018	Quarter-finals	Indonesia	2–1	Won	Bangkok, Thailand
2018	Semi-finals	Iran	0–5	Loss	Bangkok, Thailand
2018	Third place play-off	Thailand	0–0 (2–3 p)	Loss	Bangkok, Thailand
2025	Group stage	Hong Kong	5–3	Won	Hohhot, China
2025	Group stage	Philippines	3–0	Won	Hohhot, China
2025	Group stage	Iran	0–0	Draw	Hohhot, China
2025	Quarter-finals	Japan	0–2	Loss	Hohhot, China

=== ASEAN Women's Futsal Championship ===
ASEAN Women's Futsal Championship record
Year	Result	Pos.	Pld	W	D	L	GF	GA
(Philippines) 2024	Champions	1st	5	4	0	1	18	7
(Thailand) 2026	Third place	3rd	5	3	0	2	13	9
(Myanmar) 2028	To be determined							
Total	Champions	2/2	10	7	0	3	31	16

ASEAN Women's Futsal Championship history
Year	Round	Opponent	Score	Result	Venue
2024	Group stage	Myanmar	5–2	Won	Pasig, Philippines
2024	Group stage	Indonesia	5–0	Won	Pasig, Philippines
2024	Group stage	Philippines	6–1	Won	Pasig, Philippines
2024	Group stage	Thailand	0–3	Loss	Pasig, Philippines
2024	Final	Thailand	2–1 (a.e.t.)	Won	Pasig, Philippines
2026	Group stage	Australia	0–2	Loss	Nakhon Ratchasima, Thailand
2026	Group stage	Philippines	2–0	Win	Nakhon Ratchasima, Thailand
2026	Group stage	Myanmar	5–2	Win	Nakhon Ratchasima, Thailand
2026	Semi-finals	Thailand	2–4	Loss	Nakhon Ratchasima, Thailand
2026	Third place play-off	Indonesia	4–1	Win	Nakhon Ratchasima, Thailand

=== Asian Indoor and Martial Arts Games ===
Asian Indoor and Martial Arts Games record
Year	Result	Pos.	Pld	W	D	L	GF	GA
(Thailand) 2005	Did not enter							
(Macau) 2007	Fourth place	4th	4	1	1	2	12	15
(Vietnam) 2009	Group stage	5th	3	1	0	2	6	9
(South Korea) 2013	Group stage	5th	4	2	0	2	9	7
(Turkmenistan) 2017	Did not enter							
(Thailand) ~~2021~~	Canceled due to organizers failed to meet contractual obligations							
(Saudi Arabia) 2026	To be determined							
Total	Fourth place	3/6	11	4	1	6	27	31

Asian Indoor and Martial Arts Games history
Season	Round	Opponent	Scores	Result	Venue
2007	Group stage	Uzbekistan	4–4	Draw	Macau
2007	Group stage	Philippines	6–3	Won	Macau
2007	Semi-finals	Japan	3–6	Loss	Macau
2007	Bronze Medal Match	Uzbekistan	1–2	Loss	Macau
2009	Group stage	Thailand	1–6	Loss	Ho Chi Minh City, Vietnam
2009	Group stage	Malaysia	3–0	Won	Ho Chi Minh City, Vietnam
2009	Group stage	Jordan	2–3	Loss	Ho Chi Minh City, Vietnam
2013	Group stage	Thailand	1–4	Loss	Incheon, South Korea
2013	Group stage	Hong Kong	2–1	Won	Incheon, South Korea
2013	Group stage	Iran	0–1	Loss	Incheon, South Korea
2013	Group stage	Malaysia	6–1	Won	Incheon, South Korea

=== Southeast Asian Games ===
Southeast Asian Games record
Year	Result	Pos.	Pld	W	D	L	GF	GA
(Thailand) 2007	Runners-up	2nd	4	3	0	1	9	12
(Laos) 2009	No competition as not officially selected by host							
(Indonesia) 2011	Runners-up	2nd	5	3	0	2	16	8
(Myanmar) 2013	Runners-up	2nd	5	2	1	2	13	15
(Singapore) 2015	No competition as not officially selected by host							
(Malaysia) 2017	Runners-up	2nd	4	2	1	1	8	6
(Philippines) 2019	No competition as not officially selected by host							
(Vietnam) 2021	Runners-up	2nd	3	2	0	1	11	3
(Cambodia) 2023	No competition as not officially selected by host							
(Thailand) 2025	Champions	1st	4	4	0	0	13	3
(Malaysia) 2027	No competition as not officially selected by host							
(Singapore) 2029	To be determined							
(Laos) 2031	To be determined							
(Philippines) 2033	To be determined							
Total	Champions	6/6	25	16	2	7	77	39

Southeast Asian Games history
Season	Round	Opponent	Scores	Result	Venue
2007	Group stage	Myanmar	3–2	Won	Bangkok, Thailand
2007	Group stage	Thailand	1–4	Loss	Bangkok, Thailand
2007	Semi-finals	Malaysia	3–1	Won	Bangkok, Thailand
2007	Gold Medal Match	Thailand	2–5	Loss	Bangkok, Thailand
2011	Group stage	Myanmar	3–1	Won	Jakarta, Indonesia
2011	Group stage	Indonesia	6–0	Won	Jakarta, Indonesia
2011	Group stage	Thailand	1–2	Loss	Jakarta, Indonesia
2011	Group stage	Philippines	4–1	Won	Jakarta, Indonesia
2011	Gold Medal Match	Thailand	2–4	Loss	Jakarta, Indonesia
2013	Group stage	Myanmar	6–0	Won	Naypyidaw, Myanmar
2013	Group stage	Indonesia	3–1	Won	Naypyidaw, Myanmar
2013	Group stage	Thailand	1–6	Loss	Naypyidaw, Myanmar
2013	Group stage	Malaysia	3–3	Draw	Naypyidaw, Myanmar
2013	Gold Medal Match	Thailand	0–6	Loss	Naypyidaw, Myanmar
2017	Group stage	Thailand	1–3	Loss	Shah Alam, Malaysia
2017	Group stage	Malaysia	1–1	Draw	Shah Alam, Malaysia
2017	Group stage	Myanmar	4–1	Won	Shah Alam, Malaysia
2017	Group stage	Indonesia	2–1	Won	Shah Alam, Malaysia
2021	Group stage	Myanmar	6–0	Won	Hà Nam, Vietnam
2021	Group stage	Malaysia	4–1	Won	Hà Nam, Vietnam
2021	Group stage	Thailand	1–2	Loss	Hà Nam, Vietnam
2025	Group stage	Indonesia	3–1	Won	Bangkok, Thailand
2025	Group stage	Myanmar	4–2	Won	Bangkok, Thailand
2025	Semi-finals	Philippines	1–0	Won	Bangkok, Thailand
2025	Gold Medal Match	Indonesia	5–0	Won	Bangkok, Thailand

== Head-to-head record ==
As of 21 November 2026 The list shown below shows the Vietnam all-time international record against opposing teams.

Key

Positive balance
Neutral balance
Negative balance

Opponent	Pld	W	D	L	GF	GA	GD	Confederation
Australia	1	0	0	1	0	2	-2	AFC
Bahrain	4	3	1	0	18	9	+9	AFC
Bangladesh	1	1	0	0	7	0	+7	AFC
China	8	3	4	1	19	14	+5	AFC
Chinese Taipei	3	2	1	0	7	4	+3	AFC
Hong Kong	2	2	0	0	7	4	+3	AFC
Indonesia	9	9	0	0	34	5	+29	AFC
Iran	4	0	2	2	2	8	-6	AFC
Japan	4	0	0	4	4	16	-12	AFC
Jordan	1	0	0	1	2	3	-1	AFC
Macau	1	1	0	0	21	0	+21	AFC
Malaysia	10	8	2	0	40	14	+26	AFC
Myanmar	10	10	0	0	45	14	+31	AFC
New Zealand	2	1	0	1	6	5	+1	OFC
Philippines	6	6	0	0	22	5	+17	AFC
Russia	4	0	0	4	4	21	-17	UEFA
Thailand	19	2	2	15	24	65	-41	AFC
Uzbekistan	3	0	2	1	10	11	-1	AFC
Total	92	48	14	30	272	200	+72	

== Honours ==
=== Continental ===
AFC Women's Futsal Asian Cup

- Fourth place: 2018

Asian Indoor and Martial Arts Games

- Fourth place: 2007

=== Regional ===
ASEAN Women's Futsal Championship

- Winner: 2024
- Third place: 2026

SEA Games

- Gold medalist: 2025
- Silver medalist: 2007, 2011, 2013, 2017, 2021

=== Friendly competitions ===
NSDF Women's Futsal Cup

- Winner: 2024

Myanmar pre-SEA Games Four Nations Tournament

- Winner: 2013
