= Futsal at the 2011 SEA Games =

Tournament details
- Host country: Indonesia
- Dates: November 17–22
- Teams: 6 (men's); 5 (women's)
- Venue: POPKI Sports Hall

Final positions
- Champions: Thailand (men); Thailand (women)
- Runners-up: Vietnam (men); Vietnam (women)
- Third place: Indonesia (men); Myanmar (women)
- Fourth place: Malaysia (men); Indonesia (women)

Tournament statistics
- Matches played: 21
- Goals scored: 183 (8.71 per match)
- Top scorer(s): (Thailand) Suphawut Thueanklang (men – 8 goals) (Thailand) Orathai Srimanee (women – 12 goals)

The futsal tournament at the 2011 SEA Games took place from 17 to 22 November 2011. It was the second time ever that futsal was included in SEA Games, making its return after it wasn't picked for the 2009 SEA Games in Laos. This edition of the tournament featured both men's and women's tournaments. All matches were held in POPKI Sports Hall, Jakarta.

== Men's Tournament ==
All times are Western Indonesian Time (WIB) – UTC+7.

=== Group stage ===
==== Group A ====
Team	Pld	W	D	L	GF	GA	GD	Pts
Vietnam	2	1	1	0	9	3	+6	4
Indonesia	2	1	1	0	11	7	+4	4
Philippines	2	0	0	2	6	16	−10	0

17 November 2011
15:30

Indonesia	2 – 2	Vietnam
Suryasaputra 7'; Ohorella 35'	Report	Nguyen Hoang Giang 23'; Hoang Vinh Tran 33'

GOR POPKI, Jakarta

18 November 2011
15:30

Philippines	5 – 9	Indonesia
Bahadoran 9', 24'; Mallari 9'; Zerrudo 12', 21'	Report	Purnomo 2', 22'; Ohorella 3' (?); Ladjanibi (?), 35'; Tamimy 28'; Karmadi 37'; Home 40'

GOR POPKI, Jakarta

19 November 2011
15:30

Vietnam	7 – 1	Philippines
Nguyen Bao Quan 10'; Luu Quynh Toan 14', 39'; Nguyen Hoang Giang 24', 34'; Nguyen Quoc Bao 29'; Phung Trong Luan 30'	Report	Zerrudo 13'

GOR POPKI, Jakarta

==== Group B ====
Team	Pld	W	D	L	GF	GA	GD	Pts
Thailand	2	2	0	0	26	2	24	6
Malaysia	2	1	0	1	6	12	−6	3
Myanmar	2	0	0	2	3	21	−18	0

17 November 2011
18:00

Thailand	17 – 0	Myanmar
Suphawut 1', 24', 35'; Than Wunna Aung 14' (o.g.); Lertchai 16', 25'; Aung Thu 17' (o.g.); Nattaphon 18', 19'; Apiwat 19', 27', 31'; Kritsada 25'; Jetsada 26', 28', 38'; Nattavut 39'	Report

GOR POPKI, Jakarta

18 November 2011
18:00

Malaysia	2 – 9	Thailand
Ali 5', 39'	Report	Lerchai 11'; Jetsada 17', 27'; Suphawut 19', 25', 26'; Sermphan 31'; Kritsada 34'; Apiwat 39'

GOR POPKI, Jakarta

19 November 2011
18:00

Myanmar	3 – 4	Malaysia
Aung Aung 11'; Pyae Phyo Maung 32'; Htein Tin 33'; Ali 37'	Report	Qaiser 4'; Muizzudin 5'; Afif 12'

GOR POPKI, Jakarta

=== Knockout stage ===
==== Semi-finals ====
21 November 2011
15:00

Vietnam	3 – 2 (a.e.t.)	Malaysia
Nguyen Bao Quan 28'; Tran Hoang Vinh 43'; Luu Quynh Toan 46'	Report	Haniffa 37'; Asmie 44'

GOR POPKI, Jakarta
21 November 2011
18:15

Thailand	7 – 4	Indonesia
Ohorella 1' (o.g.); Panomkorn 8'; Sermphan 18'; Nattavut 20'; Jetsada 23', 24'; Panuwat 27'	Report	Tamimy 19'; Panuwat 30' (o.g.); Ladjanibi 34'; Hairul 39'

GOR POPKI, Jakarta

==== Bronze medal match ====
22 November 2011
10:00

Malaysia	2 – 3	Indonesia
Matulessy 27' (o.g.); Khairul 30'	Report	Ohorella 19', 34'; Vennard 25'

GOR POPKI, Jakarta

==== Gold medal match ====
22 November 2011
16:00

Vietnam	3 – 8	Thailand
Nguyen Thien Trong 31'; Phung Trong Luan 32'; Tran Hoang Vinh 35'	Report	Suphawut 2', 30'; Kritsada 11', 34', 39'; Sermphan 11'; Lertchai 28'; Jirawat 39'

GOR POPKI, Jakarta

=== Winners ===
SEA Games 2011 winners

Thailand

=== Goalscorers ===
8 goals

- (Thailand) Suphawut Thueanklang

7 goals

- (Thailand) Jetsada Chudech

5 goals

- (Indonesia) Hairul
- (Thailand) Kritsada Wongkaeo

4 goals

- (Thailand) Apiwat Chaemcharoen
- (Thailand) Lertchai Issarasuwipakorn

3 goals

- (Malaysia) Muhd Ali Mahat
- (Philippines) Ariel Zerrudo
- (Thailand) Sermphan Khumthinkaew
- (Vietnam) Luu Quynh Toan
- (Vietnam) Nguyen Hoang Giang

2 goals

- (Indonesia) Indra Purnomo
- (Indonesia) Jaelani Ladjanibi
- (Philippines) Misagh Bahadoran
- (Thailand) Nattaphon Suttiroj
- (Thailand) Nattawut Madyalan
- (Vietnam) Nguyen Bao Quan
- (Vietnam) Phung Trong Luan
- (Vietnam) Tran Hoang Vinh

1 goal

- (Indonesia) Afif Tamimy
- (Indonesia) Angga Surya Saputra
- (Indonesia) Sayan Karmadi
- (Indonesia) Stefanus Home
- (Indonesia) Vennard Hutabarat
- (Malaysia) Afif Najmi Muhamad Izwan
- (Malaysia) Mohd Asmie Amir Zahari
- (Malaysia) Abu Haniffa Hasan
- (Malaysia) Khairul Rizuan Harif Pagilah
- (Malaysia) Muizzudin Mohd Haris
- (Malaysia) Qaiser Heshaam Abdul Kadir
- (Myanmar) Aung Aung
- (Myanmar) Pyae Phyo Maung
- (Myanmar) Htein Tin
- (Philippines) Eddie Mallari
- (Thailand) Jirawat Sornwichian
- (Thailand) Panomkorn Saisorn
- (Thailand) Panuwat Janta
- (Vietnam) Hoang Vinh Tran
- (Vietnam) Nguyen Quoc Bao
- (Vietnam) Nguyen Thien Trong

Own goal

- (Indonesia) Hairul Ohorella (For Thailand)
- (Indonesia) Socrates Matulessy (For Malaysia)
- (Myanmar) Than Wunna Aung (For Thailand)
- (Myanmar) Aung Thu (For Thailand)
- (Thailand) Panuwat Janta (For Indonesia)

== Women's Tournament ==
All times are Western Indonesian Time (WIB) – UTC+7.

=== Group stage ===
Team	Pld	W	D	L	GF	GA	GD	Pts
Thailand	4	4	0	0	31	10	+21	12
Vietnam	4	3	0	1	14	4	+10	9
Myanmar	4	2	0	2	19	22	−3	6
Indonesia	4	1	0	3	12	20	−8	3
Philippines	4	0	0	4	8	27	−19	0

17 November 2011
10:00

Vietnam	3 – 1	Myanmar
Aye Nandar Hlaing 4' (o.g.); Trinh Ngoc Hoa 24'; Tran Thi Thuy Trang 37'	Report	Khin Mar Lar Tun (?)

GOR POPKI, Jakarta
17 November 2011
12:30

Thailand	8 – 0	Indonesia
Orathai 2', 10', 30'; Hathaichok 3', 26'; Nimrattanasing 12'; Darika 26'; Nipaporn 39'	Report

GOR POPKI, Jakarta

18 November 2011
10:00

Myanmar	6 – 3	Philippines
Khin Mar Lar Tun 6', 26', 38'; San San Maw 10', 27'; Aye Nandar Hlaing 38'	Report	Zacarias 5'; Pacificador 37'; Guico 40'

GOR POPKI, Jakarta
18 November 2011
12:30

Indonesia	0 – 6	Vietnam
	Report	Rani 2' (o.g.); Trinh Ngoc Hoa 5'; Nguyen Thi Duyen 7'; Nguyen Thi Chau 14'; Tran Thi Thuy Trang 22', 30'

GOR POPKI, Jakarta

19 November 2011
10:00

Thailand	2 – 1	Vietnam
Darika 24'; Nimrattanasing 38'	Report	Trinh Ngoc Hoa 18'

GOR POPKI, Jakarta
19 November 2011
12:30

Philippines	2 – 10	Indonesia
Placencia 3'; Thomason 17'	Report	Rani 2', 7', 18', 19'; Novita 6', 23'; Retno 9'; Maulina 17', 24' unknown (?)

GOR POPKI, Jakarta

20 November 2011
10:00

Thailand	14 – 8	Myanmar
Orathai 4', 8', 10', 12', 23', 31'; Sasicha 4', 6'; Nipaporn 7'; Darika 15', 28', 39'; San San Maw 31' (o.g.); Tupsuri 35'	Report	Khin Mar Lar Tun 8'; Nipaporn 9' (o.g.); Aye Nandar Hlaing 11', 12', 15', 17', 37', 39'

GOR POPKI, Jakarta
20 November 2011
12:30

Philippines	1 – 4	Vietnam
Thomason 34'	Report	Nguyen Thi Thanh 8', 36'; Phan Le Ai Duyen 14'; Nguyen Thi Chau 37'

GOR POPKI, Jakarta

21 November 2011
10:00

Indonesia	2 – 4	Myanmar
Novita 11'; Maulina 26'	Report	San San Maw 4'; Khin Mar Lar Tun 21', 24'; Mu Mu Lwin 29'

GOR POPKI, Jakarta
21 November 2011
12:45

Thailand	7 – 2	Philippines
Orathai 1', 12'; Prapasporn 15', 25'; Darika 21'; Nipaporn 23'; Pisayaporn 26'	Report	Thomason 22', 34'

GOR POPKI, Jakarta

=== Gold medal match ===
22 November 2011
13:00

Thailand	4 – 2	Vietnam
Orathai 6'; Nipaporn 15', 33'; Sasicha 22'	Report	Vo Thi Thuy Trinh 17'; Trinh Ngoc Hoa 28'

GOR POPKI, Jakarta

=== Winners ===
Southeast Asian Games 2011 winners

Thailand

=== Goalscorers ===
12 goals

- (Thailand) Orathai Srimanee

7 goals

- (Myanmar) Aye Nandar Hlaing
- (Myanmar) Khin Mar Lar Tun

6 goals

- (Thailand) Darika Peanpailun

5 goals

- (Thailand) Nipaporn Sriwarom

4 goals

- (Indonesia) Rani Sari
- (Philippines) Honey Thomason
- (Vietnam) Trinh Ngoc Hoa

3 goals

- (Indonesia) Maulina Novryliani
- (Indonesia) Novita Murni Piranti
- (Myanmar) San San Maw
- (Thailand) Sasicha Phothiwong
- (Vietnam) Nguyen Thi Thanh
- (Vietnam) Tran Thi Thuy Trang

2 goals

- (Thailand) Hathaichok Tappakun
- (Thailand) Jiraprapa Nimrattanasing
- (Thailand) Prapasporn Sriroj
- (Vietnam) Nguyen Thi Chau

1 goal

- (Indonesia) Unknown
- (Indonesia) Retno Ayu Dwi Wahyuningsih
- (Myanmar) Mu Mu Lwin
- (Philippines) Jocelyn Guico
- (Philippines) Karla Pacificador
- (Philippines) Richelle Placencia
- (Philippines) Cristine Zacarias
- (Thailand) Pisayaporn Mokthaisong
- (Thailand) Jiraprapa Tupsuri
- (Vietnam) Phan Le Ai Duyen
- (Vietnam) Nguyen Thi Duyen
- (Vietnam) Vo Thi Thuy Trinh

Own goal

- (Indonesia) Rani Sari (For Vietnam)
- (Myanmar) Aye Nandar Hlaing (For Vietnam)
- (Myanmar) San San Maw (For Thailand)
- (Thailand) Nipaporn Sriwarom (For Myanmar)

== Medal winners ==
Event	Gold	Silver	Bronze
Men's	Thailand; Lertchai Issarasuwipakorn; Surapong Tompa; Anuwat Saket; Natthapon Suttiroj; Kritsada Wongkaeo; Jetsada Chudech; Suphawut Thueanklang; Ekapong Suratsawang; Nattavut Madyalan; Sermphan Khumthinkaew; Apiwat Chaemcharoen; Jirawat Sornwichian	Vietnam; Nguyen Bao Quan; Dang Phuoc Anh; Nguyen Thinh Ngoc; Nguyen Trong Thien; Pham Ming Giang; Phung Trong Luan; Tran Hoang Vinh; Tran Buu Phuoc; Nguyen Quoc Bao; Nguyen Hoang Giang; Tran Van Vu; Luu Quynh Toan	Indonesia; Vennard Hutabarat; Ahmad Surya; Hairul Saleh Ohorella; Jaelani Ladjanibi; Sayan Karmadi; Socrates Matulessy; Afif Tamimy; Angga Surya Saputra; Hendri Kurniawan; Ali Haidar; Stefanus Home; Indra Kurnia Purnomo
Women's	Thailand; Jiraprapa Tupsuri; Pannipa Juijaroen; Nipaporn Sriwarom; Hataichanok Tappakun; Pisayaporn Mokthaisong; Orathai Srimanee; Jiraprapa Nimrattanasing; Siranya Srimanee; Prapasporn Sriroj; Pannipa Kamolrat; Darika Peanpailun; Sasicha Phothiwong	Vietnam; Truong Kim Ngan; Nguyen Thi Le Thu; Trinh Ngoc Hoa; Bui Thuy An; Nguyen Thi Duyen; Do Thi Kim Thoa; Nguyen Thi Chau; Thi Thuy Trang; Vo Thi Thuy Trinh; Phan Le Ai Duyen; Nguyen Thi Thanh; Hoang Thi Hai Yen	Myanmar
