= Myanmar women's national futsal team =

Myanmar
- Association: Myanmar Football Federation
- Confederation: AFC (Asia)
- Head coach: U Htay Myint
- FIFA code: MYA
- FIFA ranking: 50 ▼12 (8 May 2026)
- Lowest FIFA ranking: 38 (May 6 2024)

First international
- Thailand 6–0 Myanmar (Nakhon Ratchasima, Thailand; 7 December 2007)

Biggest win
- Myanmar 12–1 Macau (Yangon, Myanmar; 19 January 2025)

Biggest defeat
- Thailand 17–0 Myanmar (Jakarta, Indonesia; 17 November 2011)

The Myanmar women's national futsal team represents Myanmar in international women's futsal competitions and is sanctioned by the Myanmar Football Federation, the governing body for futsal in the country.

== History ==
The SEA Games has only been the international competition that Myanmar's women's team have joined. Futsal for both men's and women's was introduced in the calendar of the regional games in 2007. While the men's team had the AFF Futsal Championship there is no equivalent for the women's until 2024. The team has not entered the AFC Women's Futsal Asian Cup or joined the Asian Indoor and Martial Arts Games.

Myanmar has competed in every SEA Games featuring women's futsal, winning a bronze medal in the 2011 edition

Myanmar's futsal team which last competed in the 2017 SEA Games in Malaysia was disrupted by the COVID-19 pandemic and was reorganized around 2021 in preparation for their return to the regional games in the supposed 2021 edition in Vietnam. That games was postponed by a year allowing Myanmar to take part in the 2022 NSDF Women Futsal Championship in Thailand, a friendly tournament as part of its preparation for the regional games in Hanoi.

In 2024, Myanmar participated in the qualifiers for the 2025 AFC Women's Futsal Asian Cup in China, as well as in the inaugural 2024 ASEAN Women's Futsal Championship in the Philippines.

== Players ==
=== Current squad ===
- The following players were named on date month year for the 2026 ASEAN Women's Futsal Championship .
- Caps and goals accurate up to and including date month year.

Number	Position	Name
1	GK	Chaw Sandi Aung
2	GK	Thein Sandar Soe
	GK	
3	DF	Yun Me Me Lwin
6	DF	Sett Nwe Ni
11	DF	May Zin Oo (c)
4	DF	Su War Lwin
5	DF	Zin Nyein Chit
7	DF	Ya Min Thant Zin
8	FW	Lwin Lwin Thet
9	FW	EI EI Kyaw
10	FW	Nang Seng Brim
12	FW	Htet Hninn Htew
13	FW	May They Paing
14	FW	Ya Min Lwin

== Fixtures and results ==
Legend

Win Draw Lose Fixture

=== 2024 ===
16 November ASEAN Women's Futsal Championship GS	Philippines	2–2	Myanmar	Pasig, Philippines
19:00	Bandoja 12'; Danton 33'	Report	Lwin Lwin Thet 25'; Yoon Mie Mie Lwin 32'	Stadium: Philsports Arena

17 November ASEAN Women's Futsal Championship GS	Myanmar	2–5	Vietnam	Pasig, Philippines
16:00	Nang Seng Brim 9'; Sett Nwe Ni 16'		Trịnh Nguyễn Thanh Hằng 3'; Nguyễn Phương Anh 21'; Biện Thị Hằng 26'; Lê Thị Thanh Ngân 33' (pen.); K'Thủa 39'	Stadium: Philsports Arena

18 November ASEAN Women's Futsal Championship GS	Myanmar	1–2	Thailand	Pasig, Philippines
19:00	Yun Me Me Lwin 34'		Sangrawee 23'; Arriya 35'	Stadium: Philsports Arena

19 November ASEAN Women's Futsal Championship GS	Indonesia	7–0	Myanmar	Pasig, Philippines
16:00	Sundari 11'; Hendrita 14'; Rosdiana 16', 21'; Rosita 23'; Sari 30'; Matulapelwa 33'			Stadium: Philsports Arena

21 November ASEAN Women's Futsal Championship 3rd place match	Indonesia	4–1	Myanmar	Pasig, Philippines
16:00 UTC+8	Phu Pwint Khaing 2' (o.g.); Sari 7'; Rosdiana 25'; Karath 30'		Wutt Yee Lwin 28'	Stadium: Philsports Arena

=== 2025 ===
15 January 2025 AFC Women's Futsal Asian Cup qualification	Vietnam	5–1	Myanmar	Yangon, Myanmar
17:00 UTC+6:30	K'Thủa 02:46, 33:36; Nguyễn Phương Anh 08:35, 13:41; Trần Thị Thu Xuân 11:27	Report	Ya Min Thant Zin 11:58	Stadium: MFF Futsal Indoor Stadium, Yangon; Referee: Liang Qingyun (China)

17 January 2025 2025 AFC Women's Futsal Asian Cup qualification	Myanmar	0–4	Chinese Taipei	MFF Futsal Indoor Stadium, Yangon
17:00		Report	Sung Yun-hsuan 10:58, 37:36, 38:38; Tsou Hsin-ni 17:10	Referee: Mohd Norafendy Norhayalan (Malaysia)

19 January 2025 2025 AFC Women's Futsal Asian Cup qualification	Macau	1–12	Myanmar	MFF Futsal Indoor Stadium, Yangon
17:00	Chong Weng Lam 39:57	Report	Hoi Ka Kei 03:26 (o.g.), 09:13 (o.g.); Zin Nyein Chit 05:36, 19:50; May Thet Paing 21:40, 28:00, 39:30; May Zin Oo 30:27; Wutt Yee Lwin 31:41, 38:53; Ya Min Thant Zin 35:41, 37:45	Referee: Zahra Rahimi (Iran)

=== 2026 ===
24 February ASEAN Women's Futsal Championship GS	Philippines	1–0	Myanmar	Terminal 21 Korat , Thailand
16:00	Tolentin 14'	Report		Stadium: Nakhon Ratchasima; Referee: Panadda Khotsenaphattra (Thailand)

25 February ASEAN Women's Futsal Championship GS	Australia	6–1	Myanmar	Terminal 21 Korat , Thailand
16:00	Karrys-Stahl 14', 19'; Holder 14', 24'; Fazzari 25'; Camilleri 33'	Report	Ya Min Thant Zin 13'	Stadium: Nakhon Ratchasima; Referee: Khampasong Xayavongsy (Laos)

26 February ASEAN Women's Futsal Championship GS	Myanmar	2–5	Vietnam	Terminal 21 Korat , Thailand
13:30	Ya Min Thant Zin 8'; Lwin Lwin Htet 17'		Trần Nguyệt Vi 17', 21'; Biện Thị Hằng 22', 26', 39'	Stadium: Nakhon Ratchasima; Referee: Mohd Norafendy Norhayalan (Malaysia)

== Tournament record ==
=== FIFA Futsal Women's World Cup ===
FIFA Futsal Women's World Cup record
Year	Round	Position	GP	W	D	L	GS	GA
(Philippines) 2025	Did not qualify							
2029	-							
Total	–	0/1	0	0	0	0	0	0

=== AFC Women's Futsal Asian Cup ===
AFC Women's Futsal Asian Cup record
Year	Round	Position	GP	W	D	L	GS	GA
(China) 2025	Did not qualify							
2028	-							
Total	–	0/1	0	0	0	0	0	0

=== Asian Indoor and Martial Arts Games ===
Asian Indoor and Martial Arts Games record
Year	Round	Position	GP	W	D	L	GS	GA
(Thailand) 2005	Did not enter							
(Macau) 2007	Did not enter							
(Vietnam) 2009	Did not enter							
(South Korea) 2013	Did not enter							
(Turkmenistan) 2017	Did not enter							
(Thailand) 2021	Cancelled							
(Saudi Arabia) 2025	To be determined							
Total	–	0/5	0	0	0	0	0	0

=== ASEAN Women's Futsal Championship ===
ASEAN Women's Futsal Championship record
Year	Round	Position	GP	W	D	L	GS	GA
(Philippines) 2024	Fourth place	4/5	5	0	1	4	9	17
(Thailand) 2026	Group stage	7/7	3	0	0	3	3	12
2028								
Total	Best:Fourth place	2/2	8	0	1	7	12	29

ASEAN Women's Futsal Championship History
Year	Round	Score	Result
(Philippines) 2024	Group stage	Philippines 2-2 Myanmar	Draw
(Philippines) 2024	Group stage	Vietnam 5-2 Myanmar	Loss
(Philippines) 2024	Group stage	Thailand 2-1 Myanmar	Loss
(Philippines) 2024	Group stage	Indonesia 7-0 Myanmar	Loss
(Philippines) 2024	Third place	Indonesia 4-1 Myanmar	Loss
(Thailand) 2026	Group stage	Philippines 1-0 Myanmar	Loss
(Thailand) 2026	Group stage	Myanmar 1-6 Australia	Loss
(Thailand) 2026	Group stage	Vietnam 5-2 Myanmar	Loss

=== Southeast Asian Games ===
Southeast Asian Games record
Year	Round	Position	GP	W	D	L	GS	GA
(Thailand) 2007	Group stage	3/3	4	0	0	2	2	9
(Laos) 2009	No competition as not officially selected by host							
(Indonesia) 2011	Third place	3/5	4	2	0	2	19	22
(Myanmar) 2013	Group stage	5/5	4	0	0	4	5	18
(Singapore) 2015	No competition selected by host							
(Malaysia) 2017	Group stage	5/5	4	0	0	4	5	19
(Philippines) 2019	No competition selected by host							
(Vietnam) 2021	Group stage	4/4	3	0	1	2	3	13
(Cambodia) 2023	No competition selected by host							
(Thailand) 2025	Group stage	5/6	2	0	0	2	2	8
Total	Best:Third place	6/6	21	2	1	16	36	89

=== Other tournaments ===
NSDF Women's Futsal Championships

- 2022 Bangkok – Fifth place

== Coaches ==
- (Myanmar) U Htay Myint (2017, 2024–)
- (Myanmar) U Tin Maung Htay (2022)
