= Yun Me Me Lwin =

Burmese footballer

Personal information
- Date of birth: 10 July 1997 (age 29)
- Place of birth: Nawnghkio, Myanmar
- Position: Forward

International career^{‡}
Years	Team	Apps	(Gls)
2018	Myanmar	1	(0)
- ‡ National team caps and goals as of 13 November 2018

Yun Me Me Lwin (born 10 July 1997) is a Burmese footballer who plays as a forward. She has been a member of the Myanmar women's national team.

== International career ==
Yun Me Me Lwin capped for Myanmar at senior level during the 2020 AFC Women's Olympic Qualifying Tournament (first round). She was an unused player at the 2014 AFC Women's Asian Cup.
