= 2020 AFC Women's Futsal Championship =

Tournament details
- Host country: Kuwait
- Dates: Cancelled
- Teams: 16 (expected) (from 1 confederation)

The 2020 AFC Women's Futsal Championship was to be the third edition of the AFC Women's Futsal Championship, the biennial international futsal championship organized by the Asian Football Confederation (AFC) for the women's national teams of Asia. Kuwait was confirmed by the AFC as tournament hosts on 18 March 2020. The tournament was originally scheduled between 2–12 July 2020, but had been postponed due to the COVID-19 pandemic. Kuwait had expressed an interest to host the tournament in September 2021.

A total of 16 teams were expected to take part in the tournament. Iran are the defending champions, having won both previous editions.

== Squads ==
Each team had to submit a squad of 14 players, including a minimum of two goalkeepers.
