= Malaysia women's national futsal team =

Malaysia
- Nickname(s): Majestic Tigers; Harimau Malaysia
- Association: Football Association of Malaysia (FAM)
- Confederation: AFC (Asia); AFF (Southeast Asia)
- Head coach: Jamhuri Zainuddin
- Captain: Siti Asnidah
- Most caps: Noor Asyikin, Farahiyah Ridzuan (32)
- Top scorer: 3 players
- Home stadium: Panasonic Sports Complex (3°3′22″N 101°32′51″E)
- FIFA code: MAS
- FIFA ranking: 30 (24 September 2026)
Home colours	Away colours

First international
- Malaysia 1 – 13 Iran (Macau; 27 October 2007)

Biggest win
- Uzbekistan 4 – 9 Malaysia (Nilai, Negeri Sembilan, Malaysia; 21 September 2015)

Biggest defeat
- Brazil 27 – 0 Malaysia (Ciudad Real, Spain; 15 December 2013)

FIFA World Cup
- Appearances: 2 (First in 2012)
- Best result: Group stage, 2013

AFC Women's Futsal Championship
- Appearances: 1 (First in 2015)
- Best result: 4th place, 2015

Asian Indoor and Martial Arts Games
- Appearances: 3 (First in 2007)
- Best result: Group stage, 2007, 2009, 2013

SEA Games
- Appearances: 3 (First in 2007)
- Best result: 3rd place, (2013)

The Malaysia women's national futsal team represents Malaysia in international women's futsal competitions and is controlled by the Football Association of Malaysia.

== Tournament records ==
=== FIFA Futsal Women's World Cup ===
[[FIFA Futsal Women's World Cup|FIFA Futsal Women's World Cup Record]]
Year	Round	Position	GP	W	D	L	GS	GA
(Philippines) 2025	did not enter							
Total	0/1	—	0	0	0	0	0	0

=== Women's Futsal World tournament ===
[[Women's Futsal World Tournament|Women's Futsal World Tournament Record]]
Year	Round	Position	GP	W	D	L	GS	GA
(Spain) 2010	did not enter							
(Brazil) 2011	did not enter							
(Portugal) 2012	10th Place	10/10	5	0	0	5	3	56
(Spain) 2013	9th Place	9/9	4	0	0	4	1	67
(Costa Rica) 2014	did not enter							
(Guatemala) 2015	did not enter							
Total	2/6	9th Place	9	0	0	9	4	123

=== AFC Women's Futsal Championship ===
[[AFC Women's Futsal Championship|AFC Women's Futsal Championship Record]]
Year	Round	Position	GP	W	D	L	GS	GA
(Malaysia) 2015	4th Place	4/8	5	2	0	3	17	21
(Thailand) 2018	Group Stage	3/3	3	1	0	2	10	8
(Kuwait) 2020	cancelled due to COVID-19 pandemic							
(China) 2025	did not enter							
Total	2/3	4th Place	5	2	0	3	17	21

=== Asian Indoor and Martial Arts Games ===
[[Futsal at the Asian Indoor and Martial Arts Games|Asian Indoor and Martial Arts Games Record]]
Year	Round	Position	GP	W	D	L	GS	GA
(Thailand) 2005	did not enter							
(Macau) 2007	Group stage	7/7	5	0	0	5	5	57
(Vietnam) 2009	Group stage	7/7	3	0	0	3	2	17
(South Korea) 2013	Group stage	9/9	4	0	0	4	7	24
(Turkmenistan) 2017	did not enter							
Total	3/5	Group Stage	12	0	0	12	14	108

=== ASEAN Women's Futsal Championship ===
ASEAN Women's Futsal Championship record
Year	Round	Position	GP	W	D	L	GS	GA
(Philippines) 2024	Did not enter							
(Thailand) 2026	Group stage	6/7	2	0	1	1	4	12
Total	–	1/2	2	0	1	1	4	12

=== SEA Games ===
[[Futsal at the SEA Games|SEA Games Record]]
Year	Round	Position	GP	W	D	L	GS	GA
(Thailand) 2007	4th Place	4/6	4	2	0	2	8	11
(Indonesia) 2011	did not enter							
(Myanmar) 2013	3rd Place	3/5	4	1	2	1	9	9
(Malaysia) 2017	4th Place	4/5	4	1	1	2	4	16
(Vietnam) 2021	3rd Place	3/3	3	0	1	2	4	11
Total	4/5	3rd Place	15	4	4	7	25	47

== Results ==
Win Draw Lose

=== 2025 ===
13 December 2025 SEA Games	Philippines	3–1	Malaysia	Bangkok, Thailand
16:30 UTC+7	Dionesa Tolentin 4'; Marie Bandoja 6'; Maria Mendano 20'	Report	Farahiyah Ridzuan 19'	Stadium: Bangkokthonburi University Gymnasium

14 December 2025 SEA Games	Thailand	6–0	Malaysia	Bangkok, Thailand
16:30 UTC+7	Jenjira Bubpha 11'; Darika Peanpailun 17', 31'; Sangrawee Meekham 23'; Ariyya Saetoen 27'; Paerploy Huajaipetch 34'	Report		Stadium: Bangkokthonburi University Gymnasium; Referee: Nour Chaito (Lebanon)

== Players ==
The following players were called up for the 2025 SEA Games on 12–18 December 2025 in Bangkok, Thailand.

No.	Pos.	Player	Date of birth (age)	Caps	Goals	Club
	GK	Siti Norazizah	(age 35)			(Football Association of Malaysia) Melaka
	GK	Asma Junaidi	18 November 1992 (age 33)			(Football Association of Malaysia) Sabah
	DF	Siti Nur Atiqah Rashid	(age 33)			(Football Association of Malaysia)
	DF	Siti Asnidah	25 February 1999 (age 27)			(Football Association of Malaysia) Melaka
	DF	Hanani Adriana	2 October 1995 (age 31)			(Football Association of Malaysia) Selangor FC
	MF	Farahiyah Ridzuan	20 December 1993 (age 32)			(Football Association of Malaysia) MBSJ
	MF	Nur Afrina Azhar	(age 26)			(Football Association of Malaysia) MBSJ
	MF	Andrea Lee Xin Yi	(age 25)			(Football Association of Malaysia) Selangor
	MF	Ayuna Anjani Lamsin	1 October 2003 (age 23)			(Football Association of Malaysia) Selangor
	MF	Siti Nurkhaleeda Ismail	18 May 2001 (age 25)			(Football Association of Malaysia) Kelana United
	FW	Norhawa Md Yasin	(age 32)			(Football Association of Malaysia) MBSJ
	FW	A Nuraziela Ali Jainal	(age 28)			(Football Association of Malaysia) Melaka F.C.

=== Other call-ups ===
The following players have been called up to the Malaysia squad over the last 12 months.

Pos.	Player	Date of birth (age)	Caps	Goals	Club	Latest call-up

== Current staffs ==
Position	Name
Manager	(Malaysia) vacant
Head coach	(Malaysia) Jamhuri Zainuddin
Assistant coach	(Malaysia) vacant
Goalkeeping coach	(Malaysia) vacant
Physiotherapist	(Malaysia) vacant
Kit Man	(Malaysia) vacant

== Coaches ==
Years	Coach
2007–2009	(Malaysia) Chiew Chun Yong
2012–2013	(Malaysia) Zabri Adil
2021–	(Malaysia) Jamhuri Zainuddin

== Honours ==
=== Continental ===
- AFC Women's Futsal Asian Cup

- Fourth place : 2015

=== Regional ===
- SEA Games

- Bronze medal : 2013, 2021
- Fourth place : 2007

- Pre-SEA Games Futsal Test Match 2013

- Fourth place

== Notable former players ==
- Shahila Yunus
- Rina Jordana Adnan
- Farahiyah Ridzuan
- Rebecca Jane
- Angela Kais
- Anies Maizura
- Rozana Roslan
- Steffi Sarge Kaur
- Usliza Usman

== See also ==
- Malaysia Premier Futsal League (women)
- Malaysia national men's futsal team
