= Indonesia women's national futsal team =

Indonesia
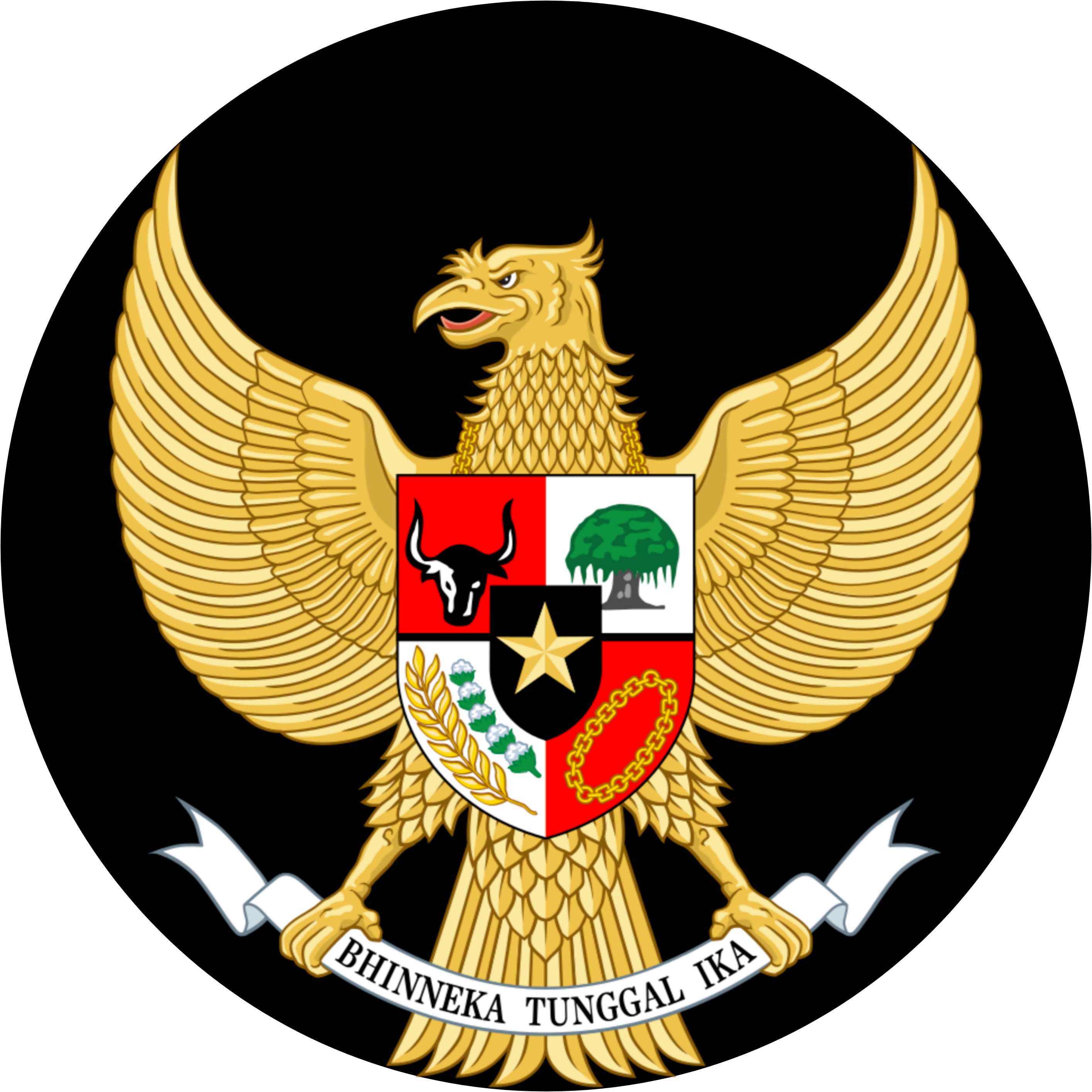
- Nickname: Garuda Pertiwi
- Association: PSSI through FFI
- Confederation: AFC (Asia)
- Sub-confederation: AFF (Southeast Asia)
- Head coach: Luís Estrela
- Captain: Novita Murni
- FIFA code: IDN
First colours	Second colours	Third colours

FIFA ranking
- Current: 21 (24 September 2026)
- Highest: 14 (6 May 2024)

First international
- Thailand 8–0 Indonesia (Cibubur, Jakarta, Indonesia; 17 November 2011)

Biggest win
- Indonesia 10–2 Philippines (Jakarta, Indonesia; 19 November 2011); Indonesia 11–3 Kyrgyzstan (Yogyakarta, Indonesia; 15 January 2025)

Biggest defeat
- Thailand 8–0 Indonesia (Cibubur, Jakarta, Indonesia; 17 November 2011)

AFC Women's Futsal Asian Cup
- Appearances: 2 (first in 2018)
- Best result: Quarter-finals (2018, 2025)

ASEAN Women's Futsal Championship
- Appearances: 2 (first in 2024)
- Best result: Third place (2024)

Asian Indoor and Martial Arts Games
- Appearances: 1 (first in 2013)
- Best result: Fourth place (2013)

SEA Games
- Appearances: 4 (first in 2011)
- Best result: Silver medal (2025)
Medal record
ASEAN Women's Futsal Championship
Bronze medal – third place	2024 Pasig	Team
SEA Games
Silver medal – second place	2025 Bangkok and Chonburi	Team
Bronze medal – third place	2017 Kuala Lumpur	Team

The Indonesia women's national futsal team represents Indonesia in international women's futsal competitions. While under the ultimate control of Indonesia's football governing body, PSSI, the one who regulates the activities of the women's national futsal team is the Indonesia Futsal Federation—futsal governing body of Indonesia and a member association of PSSI.

Unlike their men's counterpart, many players represented both the national futsal team and the national football team. This is because women's domestic football competition in Indonesia is largely non-existent, while the opposite is true for women's futsal in Indonesia.

== Competitive record ==
=== FIFA Futsal Women's World Cup ===
FIFA Futsal Women's World Cup record
Year	Round	Position	GP	W	D	L	GS	GA
(Philippines) 2025	Did not qualify							
Total	–	0/1	0	0	0	0	0	0

=== AFC Women's Futsal Asian Cup ===
AFC Women's Futsal Asian Cup record
Year	Round	Position	GP	W	D	L	GS	GA
(Malaysia) 2015	Banned	–	–	–	–	–	–	–
(Thailand) 2018	Quarterfinal	5/15	4	2	1	1	13	3
(China) 2025	Quarterfinal	7/12	4	1	1	2	7	12
(Myanmar) 2027	To be determined							
Total	Best: Quarterfinal	2/3	8	3	2	3	20	15

=== Asian Indoor and Martial Arts Games ===
Asian Indoor and Martial Arts Games record
Year	Round	Position	GP	W	D	L	GS	GA
(Thailand) 2005	Did not enter	–	–	–	–	–	–	–
(Macau) 2007	Did not enter	–	–	–	–	–	–	–
(Vietnam) 2009	Did not enter	–	–	–	–	–	–	–
(South Korea) 2013	Fourth place	4/9	5	2	0	3	8	16
(Turkmenistan) 2017	Did not enter	–	–	–	–	–	–	–
Total	Best: Fourth place	1/5	5	2	0	3	8	16

=== ASEAN Women's Futsal Championship ===
ASEAN Women's Futsal Championship record
Year	Round	Position	GP	W	D	L	GS	GA
(Philippines) 2024	Third place	3/5	5	3	0	2	13	8
(Thailand) 2026	Fourth place	4/7	4	0	1	3	7	14
(Myanmar) 2028	To be determined							
Total	Best: Third place	2/2	9	3	1	5	20	22

=== SEA Games ===
SEA Games record
Year	Round	Position	GP	W	D	L	GS	GA
(Thailand) 2007	Did not enter							
(Laos) 2009	No competition as not officially selected by host							
(Indonesia) 2011	Fourth place	4/5	4	1	0	3	12	20
(Myanmar) 2013	Fourth place	4/5	4	1	1	2	7	9
(Singapore) 2015	No competition as not officially selected by host							
(Malaysia) 2017	Third place	3/5	4	2	1	1	8	6
(Philippines) 2019	No competition as not officially selected by host							
(Vietnam) 2021	Did not enter							
(Cambodia) 2023	No competition as not officially selected by host							
(Thailand) 2025	Runners-up	2/6	4	2	0	2	12	9
Total	Best: Runners-up	2nd	16	6	2	8	39	48

== Results and fixtures ==
The following is a list of match results in the last 12 months, as well as any future matches that have been scheduled.

Win Draw Loss Fixture

=== 2025 ===
12 December 2025 SEA Games	Vietnam	3–1	Indonesia	Samut Prakan, Thailand
13:30 UTC+7				Stadium: Bangkokthonburi University Gymnasium

13 December 2025 SEA Games	Indonesia	4–0	Myanmar	Samut Prakan, Thailand
13:30 UTC+7				Stadium: Bangkokthonburi University Gymnasium

16 December 2025 SEA Games	Thailand	4–4 (6–7 p)	Indonesia	Samut Prakan, Thailand
16:30 UTC+7				Stadium: Bangkokthonburi University Gymnasium

18 December 2025 SEA Games	Vietnam	5–0	Indonesia	Samut Prakan, Thailand
16:30 UTC+7				Stadium: Bangkokthonburi University Gymnasium

== Players ==
=== Current squad ===
The following 14 players are called up for the SEA Games 2025.

No.	Pos.	Player	Date of birth (age)	Caps	Goals	Club
	GK	Sella Salsadila	4 August 2000 (age 26)			(Football Association of Indonesia) Kebumen United Angels
	GK	Fitry Amelya	12 February 2004 (age 22)			(Football Association of Indonesia) KLN Angels
	DF	Novita Murni (captain)	2 November 1990 (age 35)			(Football Association of Indonesia) MSP FC
	DF	Diah Tri Lestari	7 September 1995 (age 31)			(Football Association of Indonesia) MSP FC
	DF	Dhea Febrina	8 February 2001 (age 25)			(Football Association of Indonesia) Netic Ladies FC
	MF	Nisma Francida	14 June 1998 (age 28)			(Football Association of Indonesia) Kebumen United Angels
	MF	Dinar Kartika Sari	21 April 2000 (age 26)			(Football Association of Indonesia) Kebumen United Angels
	MF	Fitri Sundari	22 November 2005 (age 20)			(Football Association of Indonesia) KLN Angels
	MF	Quisepina Anastasia Olin	8 October 2004 (age 22)			(Football Association of Indonesia) KLN Angels
	MF	Agnes Matulapelwa	26 October 2005 (age 20)			(Football Association of Indonesia) Netic Ladies
	MF	Asselah Terecita Lukuaka	2 June 2007 (age 19)			(Football Association of Indonesia) KLN Angels
	MF	Suciana Yuliani	11 July 1992 (age 34)			(Football Association of Indonesia) Kebumen United Angels
	FW	Fitri Rosdiana	26 March 1993 (age 33)			(Football Association of Indonesia) MS Putri Bersatu
	FW	Ikeu Rosita	1 July 2000 (age 26)			(Football Association of Indonesia) Kebumen United Angels

== Honours ==
=== Continental ===
- AFC Women's Futsal Asian Cup
  - Quarter-finals: 2018 (fifth place), 2025 (seventh place)
- Asian Indoor and Martial Arts Games
  - Fourth place: 2013

=== Regional ===
- ASEAN Women's Futsal Championship
  - (bronze) Third place: 2024
  - Fourth place: 2026
- SEA Games
  - (silver) Silver medal: 2025
  - (bronze) Bronze medal: 2017
  - Fourth place: 2011, 2013

=== Other tournament ===
- PFF Women's Tri Nation Futsal Invitational
  - (gold) Champions (1): 2023

== See also ==
- Indonesia women's national football team
- Indonesia national men's futsal team
- Indonesia national football team
- Indonesia national beach soccer team
