= 2025 CAFA Women's Futsal Championship =

CAFA Women's Futsal Championship 2025

Tournament details
- Host country: Tajikistan
- City: Dushanbe
- Dates: 9–16 February
- Teams: 5 (from 1 sub-confederation)
- Venue: 1 (in 1 host city)

Final positions
- Champions: Iran (4th title)
- Runners-up: Uzbekistan
- Third place: Kyrgyz Republic
- Fourth place: Turkmenistan

Tournament statistics
- Matches played: 10
- Goals scored: 68 (6.8 per match)
- Top scorer(s): (Iran) Maral Torkaman (10 goals)
- Best player: (Iran) Maral Torkaman
- Best goalkeeper: (Turkmenistan) Malika Eminova
- Fair play award: Kyrgyz Republic

The 2025 CAFA Women's Futsal Championship was the fourth edition of the CAFA Women's Futsal Championship, the annual international futsal championship organized by CAFA for the women's national futsal teams of Central Asia. The tournament was hosted in Dushanbe, Tajikistan for the third time, from 7 to 17 February 2025.

Iran, the three-time defending champions, having won every previous edition of the tournament, successfully defended their title to claim their fourth championship.

== Participation ==
=== Participating teams ===
Five of the six CAFA member nations took part in the tournament.

Team	App.	Previous best performance	Ref.
Iran	4th	Champions (2022, 2023, 2024)	
Kyrgyz Republic	4th	Third place (2022, 2024)	
Tajikistan	4th	Third place (2022)	
Turkmenistan	2nd	Fouth place (2024)	
Uzbekistan	4th	Runners-up (2022, 2023, 2024)	

Did not enter

- Afghanistan

=== Squads ===
Each national team had to submit a squad of 14 players, two of whom must be goalkeepers.

Iran	Kyrgyz Republic	Tajikistan	Turkmenistan	Uzbekistan
1 Farzaneh Tavasolisis (C); 2 Mahtab Banaei; 3 Seyedeh Fatemeh Hosseini; 4 Fatemeh Rahmati; 5 Maryam Sadat Seyed; 6 Zahra Kiyani Manesh; 7 Fereshteh Karimi; 8 Elham Anafjeh; 9 Roghayeh Someeh; 10 Nasimeh Sadat Gholami; 11 Seyedehnastaran Moghimidarzi; 12 Zahra Lotfabadi; 13 Mahsa Alimadadi; 14 Maral Torkaman; Coach: Forouzan Soleimani	1 Akylai Sadykova; 2 Begimai Cholponbekova; 3 Nursuluu Murzakulova; 4 Aiturgan Kurmanbekova; 5 Malika Mominova; 6 Kymbat Omurbekova; 7 Kenzhebubu Yrysbek Kyzy; 8 Medina Rysbekova; 9 Nazik Kumyshbek Kyzy; 10 Aruuke Diushenova; 11 Aizhan Boronbekova (C); 12 Diana Kanatbekova; 14 Sofia Nemchenko; Coach: Erkin Dzhunushaliev	1 Munisa Gulova; 2 Ruziguli Hasan; 3 Madina Nunosibshozoda; 4 Karina Mirzoeva; 5 Benazir Jumakhonzoda; 6 Shamsiya Khuseinova; 7 Madina Yalieva; 8 Niso Abdulloeva (C); 9 Nekubakht Khudododova; 10 Zulaikho Safarova; 11 Komila Rasulova; 12 Marjona Saidova; 13 Marjona Fayzulloeva; 14 Jonona Qurbonova; Coach: Bahrom Yarmatov	1 Malika Eminova; 2 Ejegul Durdyyeva; 3 Menli Karizova; 4 Pervana Kurbanova; 5 Malika Mammedova; 6 Leyli Atajanova; 7 Kamila Mingazova; 8 Lale Haipova; 9 Jeren Mamedova; 10 Mariya Charyyeva (C); 11 Maýa Musaskaýa; 12 Amaliya Karapetyans; 13 Aylarb Berdiyeva; 14 Dzhamilya Babayeva; Coach: Kamil Mingazow	1 Nilufar Bakhtiyarova; 2 Laziza Jumaboeva; 3 Gulchekhra Eshmamatova; 4 Madina Vokhidova; 5 Zumratjon Nazarova; 6 Kholida Dadaboeva; 7 Feruza Turdiboeva (C); 8 Aygerim Otenazarova; 9 Dildora Nozimova; 10 Rushaniya Safina; 11 Ilvina Ablyakimova; 12 Ominakhon Valikhonova; 13 Ezoza Sevinova; 14 Shdiya Tosheva; Coach: Farrukh Zakirov

== Main Tournament ==
=== Tournament table ===
Pos	Team	Pld	W	D	L	GF	GA	GD	Pts	Final result
1	Iran	4	4	0	0	34	2	+32	12	Champions
2	Uzbekistan	4	2	1	1	18	17	+1	7	Runners-up
3	Kyrgyz Republic	4	1	2	1	8	15	−7	5	Third place
4	Turkmenistan	4	1	1	2	6	12	−6	4	
5	Tajikistan (H)	4	0	0	4	2	22	−20	0	

Source: CAFA
Rules for classification: Tiebreakers
(H) Hosts

=== Matches ===
9 February 2025
14:00

Turkmenistan	1–1	Kyrgyz Republic
Haipova 13'36"	Report	Yrysbek Kyzy 2'08"

Dushanbe Indoor Hall, Dushanbe
Attendance: 100
Referee: Safarali Mahmadizoda (TJK), Farzaneh Mehboodi (IRN)
9 February 2025
17:00

Uzbekistan	0–9	Iran
	Report	Manesh 5'20"; Someeh 20'15"; Hosseini 24'27", 25'40"; Torkaman 24'45", 39'57"; Benaei 31'24"; Gholami 32'21"; Karimi 35'00"

Dushanbe Indoor Hall, Dushanbe
Attendance: 129
Referee: Timur Ramazanov (TKM), Timurbek Toktobaev (KGZ)

10 February 2025
16:00

Turkmenistan	3–6	Uzbekistan
Atajanova 13'04"; Charyyeva 14'21"; Kurbanova 31'02"		Safina 0'32", 34'40"; Haipova 2'08" (o.g.); Ablyakimova 8'46"; Turdiboeva 21'20"; Vokhidova 25'39"

Dushanbe Indoor Hall, Dushanbe
10 February 2025
19:00

Kyrgyz Republic	3–0	Tajikistan
Yrysbek Kyzy 4'50"; Boronbekova 21'05"; Kumyshbek Kyzy 38'28"	Report

Dushanbe Indoor Hall, Dushanbe
Attendance: 247
Referee: Zari Fathi (IRN), Edita Mirabidova (UZB)

12 February 2025
16:00

Iran	10–0	Kyrgyz Republic
Torkaman 4'10", 23'14", 23'55"; Manesh 5'15"; Banaei 5'52"; Hosseini 14'52"; Karimi 18'06", 31'00"; Someeh 32'47", 32'57"	Report

Dushanbe Indoor Hall, Dushanbe
Attendance: 78
Referee: Timur Ramazanov (TKM), Merjen Bagshyyeva (TKM)
12 February 2025
19:00

Tajikistan	0–1	Turkmenistan
	Report	Musaskaýa 11'25"

Dushanbe Indoor Hall, Dushanbe
Attendance: 350
Referee: Fathi Zari (IRN), Nasibabonu Toshmuhammedova (UZB)

14 February 2025
16:00

Iran	5–1	Turkmenistan
Torkaman 4'25", 25'52", 33'01"; Manesh 29'04"; Someeh 39'23"	Report	Mingazova 27'36"

Dushanbe Indoor Hall, Dushanbe
Attendance: 117
Referee: Safarali Mahmadizoda (TJK), Saiyora Saidova (TJK)
14 February 2025
19:00

Uzbekistan	8–1	Tajikistan
Abdulloeva 2'49" (o.g.); Nozimova 13'54", 32'39"; Tosheva 15'24"; Safina 34'10"; Ablyakimova 35'57"; Valikhonova 37'57"; Eshmamatova 38'43"	Report	Khudododova 16'50"

Dushanbe Indoor Hall, Dushanbe
Attendance: 350
Referee: Timur Ramazanov (TKM), Farzaneh Mehboodi (IRN)

16 February 2025
16:00

Kyrgyz Republic	4–4	Uzbekistan
Murzakulova 10'07", 17'09"; Rysbekova 22'14"; Kumyshbek Kyzy 31'03"	Report	Ablyakimova 19'14"; Valikhonova 24'21"; Turdiboeva 28'54"; Vokhidova 39'49"

Dushanbe Indoor Hall, Dushanbe
Attendance: 100
Referee: Fathi Zari (IRN), Safarali Mahmadizoda (TJK)
16 February 2025
19:00

Tajikistan	1–10	Iran
Rasulova 29'49"	Report	Karimi 4'39", 33'10"; Torkaman 9'37", 30'31"; Manesh 10'39"; Banaei 15'47"; Someeh 21'27"; Hosseini 22'42"; Gholami 23'34"; Alimadadi 36'51"

Dushanbe Indoor Hall, Dushanbe
Attendance: 387
Referee: Timurbek Toktobaev (KGZ), Nasibabonu Toshmuhammedova (UZB)

== Goalscorers ==
There were 68 goals scored in 10 matches, for an average of 6.8 goals per match.

10 goals

- (Iran) Maral Torkaman

5 goals

- (Iran) Fereshteh Karimi
- (Iran) Roghayeh Someeh

4 goals

- (Iran) Seyedeh Fatemeh Hosseini
- (Iran) Zahra Kiyani Manesh

3 goals

- (Iran) Mahtab Benaei
- (Uzbekistan) Ilvina Ablyakimova
- (Uzbekistan) Rushaniya Safina

2 goals

- (Iran) Nasimeh Sadat Gholami
- (Kyrgyzstan) Nazik Kumyshbek Kyzy
- (Kyrgyzstan) Nursuluu Murzakulova
- (Kyrgyzstan) Kenzhebubu Yrysbek Kyzy
- (Uzbekistan) Dildora Nozimova
- (Uzbekistan) Feruza Turdiboeva
- (Uzbekistan) Ominakhon Valikhonova
- (Uzbekistan) Madina Vokhidova

1 goal

- (Iran) Mahsa Alimadadi
- (Kyrgyzstan) Aizhan Boronbekova
- (Kyrgyzstan) Medina Rysbekova
- (Tajikistan) Nekubakht Khudododova
- (Tajikistan) Komila Rasulova
- (Turkmenistan) Leyli Atajanova
- (Turkmenistan) Mariya Charyyeva
- (Turkmenistan) Lale Haipova
- (Turkmenistan) Pervana Kurbanova
- (Turkmenistan) Kamila Mingazova
- (Turkmenistan) Maýa Musaskaýa
- (Uzbekistan) Gulchekhra Eshmamatova
- (Uzbekistan) Shodiya Tosheva

1 own goal

- (Tajikistan) Niso Abdulloeva (against Uzbekistan)
- (Turkmenistan) Lale Haipova (against Uzbekistan)
