= 2026 CAFA Women's Futsal Championship =

CAFA Women's Futsal Championship 2026
Tournament details
- Host country: Tajikistan
- City: Dushanbe
- Dates: 23–27 June
- Teams: 3 (from 1 sub-confederation)
- Venue: 1 (in 1 host city)

Final positions
- Champions: Iran (5th title)
- Runners-up: Kyrgyzstan
- Third place: Tajikistan

Tournament statistics
- Matches played: 3
- Goals scored: 16 (5.33 per match)
- Top scorer(s): (Iran) Elham Anafjeh (Iran) Fereshteh Karimi (3 goals each)
- Best player: (Iran) Maral Torkaman
- Fair play award: Iran

The 2026 CAFA Women's Futsal Championship was the fifth edition of the CAFA Women's Futsal Championship, the annual international futsal championship organized by the Central Asian Football Association (CAFA) for the women's national futsal teams of Central Asia. The tournament was hosted in Dushanbe, Tajikistan for the third consecutive edition and the fourth time overall.

Iran were the defending champions, having won all four previous editions of the tournament.

== Participation ==
=== Participating teams ===
Of the six CAFA member nations, four were set to participate in the tournament, with Uzbekistan set to miss the competition for the first time since its inception in 2022. On 19 June 2026, CAFA announced the withdrawal of Turkmenistan due to unforeseen circumstances.

Team	App.	Previous best performance	WR
Iran	5th	Champions (2022, 2023, 2024, 2025)	10
Kyrgyzstan	5th	Third place (2022, 2024, 2025)	64
Tajikistan	5th	Third place (2022)	70

Did not enter

- Afghanistan (48)
- Turkmenistan (52)
- Uzbekistan (25)

=== Squads ===
Each national team had to submit a squad of 14 players, two of whom must be goalkeepers.

Iran	Kyrgyzstan	Tajikistan
1 Farzaneh Tavassolisis (GK); 2 Mahshid Mahjoub; 3 Mahshad Mostajeran Gourtani; 4 Shaghayegh Motamedi Sedeh; 5 Maryam Sadat Seyed; 6 Shirin Saffar; 7 Fereshteh Karimi; 8 Elham Anafjeh; 9 Zahra Kiani Manesh; 10 Nasimeh Gholami; 11 Maryam Ghaedamini; 12 Tahereh Mehdi Pour (GK); 13 Fahimeh Ghanbarisini; 14 Maral Torkaman; Coach: Shahrzad Mozafar	1 Dilnaz Zhenishbek Kyzy (GK); 2 R. Turokhodzhaeva (GK); 3 Nursuluu Murzakulova (C); 4 Aiturgan Kurmanbekova; 5 Zarina Sharsheeva; 6 Ulara Duishobaeva; 7 Batma Kokonbaeva; 8 Medina Rysbekova; 9 Diana Kanatbekova; 10 Alina Gaparova; 11 Malika Mominova; 12 Omurkan Toktogulova; 13 Sofia Nemchenko; 14 Aigiza Bokoeva; Coach: Kelkel Anarbekov	1 Farahnoz Kholdorova (GK); 2 Munisa Gulova (GK); 3 Zarina Safarzoda; 4 Mahinoz Nurova; 5 Benazir Jumakhonzoda; 6 I. Juraeva; 7 Marjona Saidova; 8 Niso Abdulloeva (C); 9 Nekubakht Khudododova; 10 Orom Nasrulloeva; 11 Madina Munosibshozoda; 12 Shukrona Ustoeva; 13 Marjona Fayzulloeva; 14 Jonona Qurbonova; Coach: Mehrubon Tilloev

== Standings ==
Pos	Team	Pld	W	D	L	GF	GA	GD	Pts
1	Iran	2	2	0	0	13	1	+12	6
2	Kyrgyzstan	2	0	1	1	1	6	−5	1
3	Tajikistan (H)	2	0	1	1	2	9	−7	1

Source: CAFA
Rules for classification: 1) Points; 2) head-to-head matches; 3) Goal difference; 4) Number of goals scored.
(H) Hosts

== Results ==
23 June 2026
18:00

Kyrgyzstan	1–1	Tajikistan
Abdulloeva 7'57" (og)	(1–0) (Note: "CAFA: Женская сборная Кыргызстана упустила победу над Таджикистаном". sport.akipress.org (in Russian). 24 June 2026. Match Report Kyrgyz Republic v. Tajikistan. CAFA. Retrieved 21 September 2026.)	Munosibshozoda 31'39"

Dushanbe Indoor Hall, Dushanbe
Attendance: 100
Referee: Nilufar Gayibnazarova (UZB)
2nd referee: Sukhrob Sattorov (TJK)

25 June 2026
18:00

Iran	5–0	Kyrgyzstan
Karimi 14'09", 35'08"; Kiyani 24'49"; Seyed 32'46", 36'46"	(1–0) (Note: "پیروزی پرگل ایران برابر قرقیزستان در آغاز کافا". the-ffiri.com (in Persian). 25 June 2026. Match Report Islamic Republic of Iran vs. Kyrgyz Republic. CAFA. Retrieved 21 September 2026.)

Dushanbe Indoor Hall, Dushanbe
Attendance: 55
Referee: Sukhrob Sattorov (TJK)
2nd referee: Saiyora Saidova (TJK)

27 June 2026
18:00

Tajikistan	1–8	Iran
Qurbonova 39'59"	(0–5) (Note: Match Report Tajikistan vs. Islamic Republic of Iran CAFA. Retrieved 21 September 2026.)	Motamedi 7'03", 11'47"; Abdulloeva 8'56" (og); Anafjeh 9'35", 30'41"; Torkaman 17'50", 29'44"; Ghaedamini 35'30"

Dushanbe Indoor Hall, Dushanbe
Attendance: 153
Referee: Timurbek Toktobaev (KGZ)
2nd referee: Nurbek Arstanbek Uulu (KGZ)
