= 2022 CAFA Women's Futsal Championship squads =

the 2022 CAFA Women's Futsal Championship was an international women's futsal tournament held in Dushanbe, Tajikistan from 21 to 28 January 2022. The four women's national teams involved in the tournament were required by Central Asian Football Association (CAFA) to register a squad of 14 players, including at least two goalkeepers.

This article lists the women's national futsal squads that take part in the tournament. The age listed for each player is as of January 21, 2022, the first day of the tournament.

== Teams ==
=== Iran ===
Head coach: Forouzan Soleimani

Iran announced their final squad, containing 13 players rather than the allowed 14.

No.	Pos.	Player	Date of birth (age)	Club
1	GK	Farzaneh Tavasolisis	19 January 1987 (aged 35)	(Football Federation Islamic Republic of Iran)
12	GK	Tahereh Mehdi Pour		(Football Federation Islamic Republic of Iran)
2	GK	Azam Akhondi Abadch		(Football Federation Islamic Republic of Iran)
3	DF	Fatemeh Rahmati		(Football Federation Islamic Republic of Iran)
11	DF	Seyedehnastaran Moghimifarzi		(Football Federation Islamic Republic of Iran)
4	MF	Mahsa Alimadadi		(Football Federation Islamic Republic of Iran)
5	MF	Sara Shirbeigi		(Football Federation Islamic Republic of Iran)
6	MF	Fereshteh Khosravi		(Football Federation Islamic Republic of Iran)
8	MF	Fatemeh Papi		(Football Federation Islamic Republic of Iran)
7	FW	Fereshteh Karimi	16 February 1989 (aged 32)	(Football Federation Islamic Republic of Iran)
9	FW	Sahar Zamanifard		(Football Federation Islamic Republic of Iran)
10	FW	Sahar Papi		(Football Federation Islamic Republic of Iran)
13	FW	Nesa Ahadi		(Football Federation Islamic Republic of Iran)

=== Kyrgyz Republic ===
Head coach: Oleg Gevlenko

No.	Pos.	Player	Date of birth (age)	Club
1	GK	Zhaina Omurbekova		(Kyrgyz Football Union)
13	GK	Natalia Gavoronskaia		(Kyrgyz Football Union)
3	DF	Sezim Kubanychbekova		(Kyrgyz Football Union)
4	DF	Irina Dorofeeva		(Kyrgyz Football Union)
5	DF	Kenzhebubu Yrysbekov Kyzy		(Kyrgyz Football Union)
7	DF	Aidana Otorbaeva		(Kyrgyz Football Union)
6	FW	Kymbat Omurbekova		(Kyrgyz Football Union)
8	FW	Aiturgan Askarova		(Kyrgyz Football Union)
9	FW	Nazik Kumyshbek Kyzy		(Kyrgyz Football Union)
10	FW	Bakhygul Toktobolotova	5 July 2000 (aged 21)	(Kyrgyz Football Union)
11	FW	Aizhan Boronbekova	31 March 2000 (aged 21)	(Kyrgyz Football Union)
12	FW	Aiperi Saskeeva		(Kyrgyz Football Union)
14	FW	Tolgonai Almazbekova		(Kyrgyz Football Union)

=== Tajikistan ===
Head coach: Shamshod Niyatbekov

No.	Pos.	Player	Date of birth (age)	Club
1	GK	Saiyora Saidova	1 February 1998 (aged 23)	(Tajikistan Football Federation)
2	GK	Ruziguli Hasan		(Tajikistan Football Federation)
6	DF	Niso Abdulloeva	24 December 2003 (aged 18)	(Tajikistan Football Federation)
5	DF	Benazir Jumakhonzoda	27 October 2001 (aged 20)	(Tajikistan Football Federation)
9	DF	Nekubakht Khudododova	23 February 2002 (aged 19)	(Tajikistan Football Federation)
3	MF	Marjona Saidova		(Tajikistan Football Federation)
4	MF	Karina Mirzoeva	12 March 2004 (aged 17)	(Tajikistan Football Federation)
8	MF	Shamsiya Khuseinova	15 December 1996 (aged 25)	(Tajikistan Football Federation)
10	MF	Rukhshona Fayzulloeva		(Tajikistan Football Federation)
12	MF	Laylo Khalimova	16 November 1997 (aged 24)	(Tajikistan Football Federation)
7	FW	Madina Davlyatova	1 June 2004 (aged 17)	(Tajikistan Football Federation)
11	FW	Madina Fozilova	1 May 1996 (aged 25)	(Football Association of Maldives)
13	FW	Malika Kayumova	10 March 2005 (aged 16)	(Tajikistan Football Federation)
14	FW	Jonona Qurbonova	18 July 2000 (aged 21)	(Tajikistan Football Federation)

=== Uzbekistan ===
Head coach: Farrukh Zakirov

No.	Pos.	Player	Date of birth (age)	Club
1	GK	Laylo Tilovova	8 March 1997 (aged 24)	(Uzbekistan Football Association) PFK Sevinch
12	GK	Maftuna Jonimqulova	26 July 1999 (aged 22)	(Uzbekistan Football Association)
13	GK	Gulandon Boymatova	5 March 1997 (aged 24)	(Uzbekistan Football Association)
2	DF	Madina Khikmatova		(Uzbekistan Football Association)
3	DF	Ugiloy Kuchkarova	7 December 1996 (aged 25)	(Uzbekistan Football Association) FC Sogdiana
4	DF	Ezoza Sharipova	11 June 1996 (aged 25)	(Uzbekistan Football Association)
5	DF	Zumratjon Nazarova	27 May 1992 (aged 29)	(Uzbekistan Football Association)
9	DF	Feruza Turdiboeva	6 January 1994 (aged 28)	(Uzbekistan Football Association)
10	DF	Gulzoda Amirova	13 October 1999 (aged 22)	(Uzbekistan Football Association)
11	DF	Maftuna Shoyimova	1 January 1999 (aged 23)	(Uzbekistan Football Association)
6	FW	Aziza Norboeva	12 December 1996 (aged 25)	(Uzbekistan Football Association) FC Bunyodkor
7	FW	Nilufar Kudratova	5 June 1997 (aged 24)	(Uzbekistan Football Association) PFK Sevinch
8	FW	Dildora Ergasheva	18 March 1999 (aged 22)	(Uzbekistan Football Association) FC Sogdiana
14	FW	Nozimakhon Ergasheva	23 January 2001 (aged 20)	(Uzbekistan Football Association)
