= Kyrgyzstan women's national futsal team =

Women's national futsal team representing Kyrgyzstan

Kyrgyz Republic
- Association: Kyrgyz Football Union (KFU)
- Confederation: Asian Football Confederation (AFC)
- FIFA code: KGZ
- FIFA ranking: 67 ▲2 (4 April 2025)
- Highest FIFA ranking: 66 (May 2024)
- Lowest FIFA ranking: 69 (October 2024)
Home colours	Away colours

First international
- Tajikistan 1–1 Kyrgyzstan (Dushanbe, Tajikistan; 21 February 2022)

Biggest win
- Tajikistan 1–4 Kyrgyzstan (Dushanbe, Tajikistan; 27 February 2022)

Biggest defeat
- Kyrgyzstan 0–13 Russia (Bishkek, Kyrgyzstan; 14 December 2024)

CAFA Women's Futsal Championship
- Appearances: 3 (First in 2022)
- Best result: (bronze) Third place (2022, 2024)

The Kyrgyz Republic women's national futsal team (Russian: Женская сборная Кыргызстана по футзалу) represents Kyrgyzstan in international women's futsal competitions and is run by the Kyrgyz Football Union (KFU).

== History ==
In November 2021, the team played its first matches against the Kazakhstan Students' team in Bishkek, losing both games. In January 2022, the team participated in the inaugural 2022 CAFA Women's Futsal Championship in Dushanbe, Tajikistan. On 21 February 2022, the team made its tournament debut with a 1–1 draw against the hosts, marking their first-ever international match. After losing to Iran and Uzbekistan, the team won 4–1 against Tajikistan in the second leg to claim bronze.

== Results and fixtures ==
The following is a list of match results in the last 12 months, as well as any future matches that have been scheduled.

Win Draw Loss Fixture

=== 2024 ===
4 February 2024 CAFA Championship	Turkmenistan	1–3	Kyrgyzstan	Dushanbe, Tajikistan
14:00 UTC+5	Mämmedowa 1:21	Report	Turalieva 13:54; Yrysbek Kyzy 16:11; Mämedowa 32:11 (o.g.)	Stadium: Dushanbe Indoor Hall; Attendance: 70; Referee: Zahra Rahimi (Iran)

5 February 2024 CAFA Championship	Kyrgyzstan	4–2	Tajikistan	Dushanbe, Tajikistan
19:00 UTC+5	Yrysbek Kyzy 06:20, 09:58; Marzakulova 08:19; Rysbekova 35:49	Report	Fayzulloeva 07:20; Rasulova 25:19	Stadium: Dushanbe Indoor Hall; Attendance: 200; Referee: Zahra Rahimi (Iran)

7 February 2024 CAFA Championship	Iran	11–0	Kyrgyzstan	Dushanbe, Tajikistan
16:00 UTC+5	Khosravi 01:11; Shirbeigi 04:16, 21:12, 31:35, 33:13; Hosseini 07:15, 27:00; Banaei 29:53, 30:29; Anafjeh 36:01; Afrough 36:26	Report		Stadium: Dushanbe Indoor Hall; Attendance: 40; Referee: Sukhrob Sattorov (Tajikistan)

11 February 2024 CAFA Championship	Kyrgyzstan	2–8	Uzbekistan	Dushanbe, Tajikistan
16:00 UTC+5	Mominova 25:48, 26:09	Report	Safina 00:31; Turdiboeva 07:44, 19:35; Tosheva 23:08; Panjieva 24:43; Valikhanova 28:03; Diushenova 33:43 (o.g.); Dadaboeva 39:25	Stadium: Dushanbe Indoor Hall; Attendance: 110; Referee: Zahra Rahimi (Iran)

14 December Friendly	Kyrgyzstan	0–13	Russia	Bishkek, Kyrgyzstan
--:-- UTC+5		Report

15 December Friendly	Kyrgyzstan	0–12	Russia	Bishkek, Kyrgyzstan
--:-- UTC+5		Report

21 December Friendly	Kyrgyzstan	1–7	Uzbekistan	Bishkek, Kyrgyzstan
--:-- UTC+5

23 December Friendly	Kyrgyzstan	0–6	Uzbekistan	Bishkek, Kyrgyzstan
--:-- UTC+5

=== 2025 ===
15 January 2025 2025 AFC Women's Futsal Asian Cup qualification	Indonesia	11–3	Kyrgyzstan	Yogyakarta
				Stadium: Among Rogo Sports Hall

17 January 2025 2025 AFC Women's Futsal Asian Cup qualification	Kyrgyzstan	0–4	Hong Kong	Yogyakarta
				Stadium: Among Rogo Sports Hall

19 January 2025 2025 AFC Women's Futsal Asian Cup qualification	India	3–4	Kyrgyzstan	Yogyakarta
				Stadium: Among Rogo Sports Hall

7 February 2025 CAFA Championship	Kyrgyzstan	v	Turkmenistan	Dushanbe
--:-- UTC+5				Stadium: Dushanbe Indoor Hall

8 February 2025 CAFA Championship	Tajikistan	v	Kyrgyzstan	Dushanbe
--:-- UTC+5				Stadium: Dushanbe Indoor Hall

10 February 2025 CAFA Championship	Kyrgyzstan	v	Iran	Dushanbe
--:-- UTC+5				Stadium: Dushanbe Indoor Hall

14 February 2025 CAFA Championship	Uzbekistan	v	Kyrgyzstan	Dushanbe
--:-- UTC+5				Stadium: Dushanbe Indoor Hall

== Players ==
=== Current squad ===
The following 17 players were named for the Friendly matches against Russia from 9 to 13 December 2024.

No.	Pos.	Player	Date of birth (age)	Club
1	GK	Akilay Sadikova	12 October 2003 (age 21)	
2	GK	Dilnaz Zhenishbek Kyzy		
	GK	Begimai Cholponbekova		
3	FP	Nursuluu Murzakulova		
4	FP	Aiturgan Kurmanbekova		
5	FP	Adelaida Mirzalieva		
6	FP	Kimbat Omurbekova		
7	FP	Kenzhebubu Yrysbek Kyzy		
8	FP	Medina Rysbekova		
10	FP	Nagima Turalieva		
11	FP	Aizhan Boronbekova (Captain)	31 March 2000 (age 25)	(Lithuania) MFA Žalgiris
14	FP	Alina Gaparova		
17	FP	Diana Kanatbekova		
20	FP	Ulara Kachibekova		
	FP	Aruuke Diushenova		
	FP	Nazik Kumyshbek Kyzy		`
	FP	Malika Mominova		

=== Previous squads ===
CAFA Women's Futsal Championship

- 2022 CAFA Women's Futsal Championship squad
- 2023 CAFA Women's Futsal Championship squad

== Competitive record ==
=== FIFA Futsal Women's World Cup ===
FIFA Futsal Women's World Cup record									Qualification record						
Host nation(s) and year	Round	Pos	Pld	W	D	L	GF	GA	Outcome	Pld	W	D	L	GF	GA
(Philippines) 2025	Did not qualify								Did not qualify						
Total	0/0	–	–	–	–	–	–	–	Total	–	–	–	–	–	–

=== AFC Women's Futsal Asian Cup ===
AFC Women's Futsal Asian Cup record								Qualification record						
Host nation(s) and year	Round	Pld	W	D	L	GF	GA	Outcome	Pld	W	D	L	GF	GA
(Malaysia) 2015	Did not enter							Did not enter						
(Thailand) 2018	Did not enter							Did not enter						
(China) 2025	Did not qualify							To be determined						
Total	0/2	–	–	–	–	–	–	Total	–	–	–	–	–	–

=== CAFA Women's Futsal Championship ===
CAFA Women's Futsal Championship record
Year	Result	GP	W	D*	L	GS	GA	GD	Squad	Coach
(Tajikistan) 2022	Third place	6	1	1	4	5	38	−33	squad	Oleg Gevlenko
(Uzbekistan) 2023	Fourth place	3	0	0	3	3	15	−12	squad	Oleg Gevlenko
(Tajikistan) 2024	Third place	4	2	0	2	9	22	−13	Squad	Kelkel Anarbekov
Total	3/3	13	3	1	9	17	75	−58		

*Draws include knockout matches decided on penalty kicks.

== See also ==
- Kyrgyzstan national futsal team
