= 2024 CAFA Women's Futsal Championship =

CAFA Women's Futsal Championship 2024
Tournament details
- Host country: Tajikistan
- City: Dushanbe
- Dates: 2–12 February
- Teams: 5 (from 1 sub-confederation)
- Venue: 1 (in 1 host city)

Final positions
- Champions: Iran (3rd title)
- Runners-up: Uzbekistan
- Third place: Kyrgyz Republic
- Fourth place: Turkmenistan

Tournament statistics
- Matches played: 10
- Goals scored: 73 (7.3 per match)
- Attendance: 1,369 (137 per match)
- Top scorer(s): (Iran) Sara Shirbeigi (11 goals)
- Best player: (Iran) Maral Torkaman
- Best goalkeeper: (Uzbekistan) Sevara Nurullaeva
- Fair play award: Iran

The 2024 CAFA Women's Futsal Championship was the third edition of the CAFA Women's Futsal Championship, the annual international futsal championship organized by CAFA for the women's national futsal teams of Central Asia. the tournament was hosted in Dushanbe, Tajikistan.

Iran were two-time defending champions having won the last two editions. and they successfully defended their title.

== Participation ==
=== Participating teams ===
A total of 5 (out of 6) CAFA member national teams entered the tournament. with Turkmenistan participating in the tournament for the first time since its establishment in 2022.

Team	Appearance	Previous best performance
Iran	3rd	Champions (2022, 2023)
Kyrgyz Republic	3rd	Third place (2022)
Tajikistan	3rd	Third place (2022)
Turkmenistan	1st	Debut
Uzbekistan	3rd	Runners-up (2022, 2023)

Did not enter

- Afghanistan

=== Squads ===
Each national team had to submit a squad of 14 players, two of whom must be goalkeepers.

== Match officials ==
Ten referees from the five participating associations were appointed for the tournament.

Referees

- (Iran) Zahra Rahimi
- (Iran) Behnaz Abak
- (Kyrgyzstan) Talantbek Raimberdiev
- (Kyrgyzstan) Myrzabek Zhaparov
- (Kyrgyzstan) Syimyk Zhytgalbekov
- (Tajikistan) Saiyora Saidova
- (Tajikistan) Sukhrob Sattorov
- (Turkmenistan) Merjen Bagşyýewa
- (Uzbekistan) Aleksandra Konchikova
- (Uzbekistan) Gulshoda Saitkulova

== Main Tournament ==
All times are local, TJT (UTC+5).

The competition schedule was announced on 31 January 2024.

=== Tournament table ===
Pos	Team	Pld	W	D	L	GF	GA	GD	Pts	Final result
1	Iran	4	4	0	0	34	1	+33	12	Champions
2	Uzbekistan	4	3	0	1	20	9	+11	9	Runners-up
3	Kyrgyz Republic	4	2	0	2	9	22	−13	6	Third place
4	Turkmenistan	4	1	0	3	7	17	−10	3	
5	Tajikistan (H)	4	0	0	4	3	24	−21	0	

Source: CAFA
Rules for classification: Tiebreakers
(H) Hosts

=== Matches ===
4 February 2024
14:00

Turkmenistan	1–3	Kyrgyz Republic
Mämmedowa 1:21	Report (CAFA)	Turalieva 13:54; Yrysbek Kyzy 16:11; Mämedowa 32:11 (o.g.)

Dushanbe Indoor Hall, Dushanbe
Attendance: 70
Referee: Zahra Rahimi (Iran)
4 February 2024
17:00

Uzbekistan	1–5	Iran
Turdiboeva 33:26	Report (CAFA)	Hosseini 05:48, 28:57; Torkaman 06:54; Shirbeigi 22:40; Afrough 27:07

Dushanbe Indoor Hall, Dushanbe
Attendance: 83
Referee: Sukhrob Sattorov (Tajikistan)

5 February 2024
16:00

Turkmenistan	2–4	Uzbekistan
Haipowa 05:56; Valikhanova 16:17 (o.g.)	Report (CAFA)	Safina 02:02; Turdiboeva 14:50; Bobokulova 22:16; Nazarova 37:19

Dushanbe Indoor Hall, Dushanbe
Attendance: 23
Referee: Sukhrob Sattorov (Tajikistan)
5 February 2024
19:00

Kyrgyz Republic	4–2	Tajikistan
Yrysbek Kyzy 06:20, 09:58; Marzakulova 08:19; Rysbekova 35:49	Report (CAFA)	Fayzulloeva 07:20; Rasulova 25:19

Dushanbe Indoor Hall, Dushanbe
Attendance: 200
Referee: Zahra Rahimi (Iran)

7 February 2024
16:00

Iran	11–0	Kyrgyz Republic
Khosravi 01:11; Shirbeigi 04:16, 21:12, 31:35, 33:13; Hosseini 07:15, 27:00; Banaei 29:53, 30:29; Anafjeh 36:01; Afrough 36:26	Report (CAFA)

Dushanbe Indoor Hall, Dushanbe
Attendance: 40
Referee: Sukhrob Sattorov (Tajikistan)
7 February 2024
19:00

Tajikistan	1–4	Turkmenistan
Rasulova 37:29	Report (CAFA)	Çaryýewa 03:16, 38:06; Mämedowa 36:21; Haipowa 37:40

Dushanbe Indoor Hall, Dushanbe
Attendance: 250
Referee: Talantbek Raimberdiev (Kyrgyz Republic)

9 February 2024
16:00

Iran	9–0	Turkmenistan
Afrough 10:40, 23:33; Shirbeigi 16:43; Çaryýewa 20:23 (o.g.); Khosravi 21:01, 21:11; Hosseini 26:49; Kamali 27:53; Torkaman 38:20	Report (CAFA)

Dushanbe Indoor Hall, Dushanbe
Attendance: 40
Referee: Aleksandra Konchikova (Uzbekistan)
9 February 2024
19:00

Uzbekistan	7–0	Tajikistan
Turdiboeva 10:47; Vokhidova 14:27, 15:23; Safina 20:08, 32:22; Valikhanova 36:05, 39:45	Report (CAFA)

Dushanbe Indoor Hall, Dushanbe
Attendance: 300
Referee: Talantbek Raimberdiev (Kyrgyz Republic)

11 February 2024
16:00

Kyrgyz Republic	2–8	Uzbekistan
Mominova 25:48, 26:09	Report (CAFA)	Safina 00:31; Turdiboeva 07:44, 19:35; Tosheva 23:08; Panjieva 24:43; Valikhanova 28:03; Diushenova 33:43 (o.g.); Dadaboeva 39:25

Dushanbe Indoor Hall, Dushanbe
Attendance: 110
Referee: Zahra Rahimi (Iran)
11 February 2024
19:00

Tajikistan	0–9	Iran
	Report (CAFA)	Torkaman 01:56; Shirbeigi 03:47, 12:22, 14:17, 20:50, 36:24; Rahmati 07:52; Hosseini 15:43; Khosravi 36:42

Dushanbe Indoor Hall, Dushanbe
Attendance: 253
Referee: Aleksandra Konchikova (Uzbekistan)

== Goalscorers ==
There were 73 goals scored in 10 matches, for an average of 7.3 goals per match.

11 goals

- (Iran) Sara Shirbeigi

6 goals

- (Iran) Seyedeh Hosseini

5 goals

- (Uzbekistan) Feruza Turdiboeva

4 goals

- (Iran) Ziba Afrough
- (Iran) Fereshteh Khosravi
- (Uzbekistan) Rushaniya Safina

3 goals

- (Iran) Maral Torkaman
- (Kyrgyzstan) Kenzhebubu Yrysbek Kyzy
- (Uzbekistan) Omina Valikhanova

2 goals

- (Iran) Mahtab Banaei
- (Kyrgyzstan) Malika Mominova
- (Tajikistan) Komila Rasulova
- (Turkmenistan) Läle Haipowa
- (Turkmenistan) Mariýa Çaryýewa
- (Uzbekistan) Madina Vokhidova

1 goal

- (Iran) Elham Anafjeh
- (Iran) Mahsa Kamali
- (Iran) Fatemeh Rahmati
- (Kyrgyzstan) Nursuluu Marzakulova
- (Kyrgyzstan) Medina Rysbekova
- (Kyrgyzstan) Nagima Turalieva
- (Tajikistan) Marjona Fayzulloeva
- (Turkmenistan) Malika Mämmedowa
- (Turkmenistan) Jeren Mämedowa
- (Uzbekistan) Albina Bobokulova
- (Uzbekistan) Zumratjon Nazarova
- (Uzbekistan) Shodiya Tosheva
- (Uzbekistan) Maftuna Panjieva
- (Uzbekistan) Kholida Dadavoeva

1 own goal

- (Kyrgyzstan) Aruuke Diushenova (against Uzbekistan)
- (Turkmenistan) Mariýa Çaryýewa (against Iran)
- (Turkmenistan) Jeren Mämedowa (against Kyrgyzstan)
- (Uzbekistan) Omina Valikhanova (against Turkmenistan)

== Player awards ==
The following awards were given at the conclusion of the tournament:

Most Valuable player Award
(Iran) Maral Torkaman
Top Goalscorer Award
(Iran) Sara Shirbeigi
Best goalkeeper
(Uzbekistan) Sevara Nurullaeva
Fair Play Award
Iran
