= Turkmenistan women's national futsal team =

Turkmenistan
- Association: Football Federation of Turkmenistan
- Confederation: AFC (Asia)
- Head coach: Kamil Mingazow
- Captain: Mariya Charyyeva
- Home stadium: Winter Sports Complex Ashgabat
- FIFA code: TKM
- FIFA ranking: 52 ▼1 (8 May 2026)
- Highest FIFA ranking: 38 (May 2024)
- Lowest FIFA ranking: 39 (May 2024)
Home colours	Away colours

First international
- Turkmenistan 1–6 Hong Kong (Ashgabat, Turkmenistan; 16 September 2017)

Biggest win
- Kuwait 0–6 Turkmenistan (Kuwait City, Kuwait; 31 March 2019)

Biggest defeat
- Turkmenistan 0–14 Iran (Bangkok, Thailand; 3 May 2018)

Asian Championship
- Appearances: 1 (First in 2018)
- Best result: Group Stage (2018)

CAFA Women's Futsal Championship
- Appearances: 1 (First in 2024)
- Best result: Fourth place (2024)

The Turkmenistan women's national futsal team (Turkmen: Türkmenistanyň futzal boýunça zenanlar ýygyndysy) represents Turkmenistan in international women's futsal competitions and is run by the Football Federation of Turkmenistan (FFT).

== History ==
=== First Kick: Beginnings ===
Established in 2011, the Turkmen team played its first international game during the Qarshi women's futsal cup in Uzbekistan.

Six years after their previous match, Turkmenistan hosted the 2017 Asian Indoor and Martial Arts Games. During this comeback, the team was placed in Group B alongside China, Hong Kong, and Japan. Unfortunately, the team faced setbacks, losing all three games and ultimately exiting from the group stage.

In the following year, Turkmenistan made its debut at the 2018 AFC Women's Futsal Championship in Thailand. The team was placed in group D alongside neighboring Iran and Uzbekistan. They suffered their most significant defeat to date, losing 0–14 to Iran, and also faced a 1–3 defeat against Uzbekistan.

In March 2019, the national team traveled to Kuwait City for two friendly matches against the Kuwait. The team achieved success by winning both games with scores of 0–6 and 1–5, marking their first historic victories.

In 2024, Turkmenistan made its debut in the CAFA Women's Futsal Championship, participating in the tournament hosted in Dushanbe, Tajikistan, after missing the first two editions.

In January 2025, Turkmenistan women's national futsal team entered the qualification tournament for the 2025 AFC Women's Futsal Asian Cup with Kamil Mingazow named as head coach.

== Results and fixtures ==
The following is a list of all match results, as well as any future matches that have been scheduled.

Legend

Win Draw Loss Fixtures

=== 2017 ===
16 September 2017 2017 Asian Indoor and Martial Arts Games	Turkmenistan	1–6	Hong Kong	Ashgabat, Turkmenistan
13:15	Amanmuhammedowa 22'	Report	Chan Wing Sze 4', 18', 20'; Wong So Han 12'; Wong Shuk Fan 27', 28'	Stadium: Ice Arena; Referee: Tita Puspita Sari (Indonesia)

17 September 2017 2017 Asian Indoor and Martial Arts Games	China	3–1	Turkmenistan	Ashgabat, Turkmenistan
12:15	Dong Jiabao 5'; Li Jingjing 7', 38'	Report	Fan Yuqiu 19' (o.g.)	Stadium: Ice Arena; Referee: Gelareh Nazemi (Iran)

20 September 2017 2017 Asian Indoor and Martial Arts Games	Turkmenistan	0–8	Japan	Ashgabat, Turkmenistan
13:15		Report	Egawa 10', 16', 34', 36'; Takao 26'; Sakurada 31'; Tanaka 36'; Sakata 37'	Stadium: Ice Arena; Referee: Tita Puspita Sari (Indonesia)

=== 2018 ===
3 May 2018 2018 AFC Women's Futsal Championship	Turkmenistan	0–14	Iran	Bangkok, Thailand
18:00		Report	Etedadi 1', 12', 35', 38'; Zarei 5', 6', 40'; Karimi 8', 16', 23'; Papi 16'; Moghimdarzi 18'; Sadaghianizadeh 24'; Shirbeigi 32'	Stadium: Indoor Stadium Huamark; Attendance: 105; Referee: Mari Miyazaki (Japan)

5 May 2018 2018 AFC Women's Futsal Championship	Uzbekistan	3–1	Turkmenistan	Bangkok, Thailand
18:00	Nazarova 17'; Safina 19'; Burkhonova 23'	Report	Eshnyyazova 40'	Stadium: Indoor Stadium Huamark; Attendance: 100; Referee: Ji Shuang (China)

=== 2019 ===
31 March 2019 Friendly	Kuwait	0–6	Turkmenistan	Kuwait City, Kuwait

3 April 2019 Friendly	Kuwait	1–5	Turkmenistan	Kuwait City, Kuwait

=== 2024 ===
4 February 2024 2024 CAFA Women's Futsal Championship	Turkmenistan	1–3	Kyrgyzstan	Dushanbe, Tajikistan
14:00	Mammedova 1:21		Turalieva 13:54, 32:11; Yrysbek Kyzy 16:11	Stadium: Dushanbe Indoor Hall; Referee: Zahra Rahimi (Iran)

5 February 2024 2024 CAFA Women's Futsal Championship	Turkmenistan	2–4	Uzbekistan	Dushanbe, Tajikistan
16:00	Haipova 05:56; Mamedova 16:17		Safina 02:02; Turdiboeva 14:50; Bobokulova 22:16; Nazarova 37:19	Stadium: Dushanbe Indoor Hall; Referee: Sukhrob Sattorov (Tajikistan)

7 February 2024 2024 CAFA Women's Futsal Championship	Tajikistan	1–4	Turkmenistan	Dushanbe, Tajikistan
19:00	Rasulova 37:29		Charyyeva 03:16, 38:06; Mammedova 36:21; Haipova 37:40	Stadium: Dushanbe Indoor Hall; Referee: Talantbek Raimberdiev (Kyrgyz Republic)

9 February 2024 2024 CAFA Women's Futsal Championship	Iran	9–0	Turkmenistan	Dushanbe, Tajikistan
16:00	Afrough 10:40, 23:33; Shirbeigi 16:43, 20:23; Khosravi 21:01; Moghimi Farzi 21:11; Hosseini 26:49; Kamali 27:53; Torkaman 38:20			Stadium: Dushanbe Indoor Hall; Referee: Aleksandra Konchikova (Uzbekistan)

=== 2025 ===
11 January 2025 AFC Asian Cup qualification	Australia	6–1	Turkmenistan	Tashkent, Uzbekistan
15:00 UTC+5	Fazzari 01:33, 31:50; Camilleri 02:46, 33:58; Fruscalzo 18:07; Tabain 31:00	Report	Mämmetsähedowa 05:48	Stadium: Yunusobod Sport Complex; Referee: Maryam Al-Hadhrami (Oman)

15 January 2025 AFC Asian Cup qualification	Turkmenistan	0–2	Philippines	Tashkent, Uzbekistan
15:00 UTC+5		Report	Guillou 22:18; Tolentin 29:56	Stadium: Yunusobod Sport Complex; Referee: Suhrob Sattorov (Tajikistan)

17 January 2025 AFC Asian Cup qualification	Turkmenistan	4–3	Kuwait	Tashkent, Uzbekistan
15:00 UTC+5	Kurbanowa 10:13, 28:48; Çaryýewa 20:26; Mämmetsähedowa 27:22	Report	Al-Herz 19:55 (2pen.); Al-Refaie 25:35; Basha 39:34	Stadium: Yunusobod Sport Complex; Referee: Najat Al-Blooshi (United Arab Emirates)

19 January 2025 AFC Asian Cup qualification	Uzbekistan	6–2	Turkmenistan	Tashkent, Uzbekistan
18:00 UTC+5	Shoyimova 01:17, 02:55, 09:44, 23:03, 33:01; Kudratova 38:40	Report	Kurbanowa 15:24; Mingazowa 23:52	Stadium: Yunusobod Sport Complex; Referee: Rawand Shwan (Iraq)

== Players ==
=== Current squad ===
The following players were named for the 2025 AFC Women's Futsal Asian Cup qualification from 11 to 19 January 2025.

No.	Pos.	Player	Date of birth (age)	Club
1	GK	Aysha Amanberdiyeva	8 January 2004 (age 22)	(Turkish Football Federation) Dudullu Spor
2	FP	Ejegul Durdyyeva		(Football Federation of Turkmenistan) FC Altyn Tach
3	FP	Mariya Hmyrova		(Turkish Football Federation) Istanbul Aydın University Team
4	FP	Pervana Kurbanova		(Football Federation of Turkmenistan) FC Ýyldyz Daşoguz Region
5	FP	Malika Mammedova		(Football Federation of Turkmenistan) FC Altyn Tach
6	FP	Leyli Atajanova		(Football Federation of Turkmenistan) FC Altyn Tach
7	FP	Kamila Mingazova	17 October 2005 (age 20)	(Football Federation of Turkmenistan) FC Altyn Tach
8	FP	Lale Haipova		(Turkish Football Federation) Istanbul Bilgi University Team
9	FP	Jeren Mamedova		(Football Federation of Turkmenistan) FC Altyn Tach
10	FP	Mariya Charyyeva	20 April 2000 (age 26)	(Football Federation of Turkmenistan) FC Altyn Tach
11	FP	Maya Musaskaya	6 January 2000 (age 26)	(Lithuanian Football Federation) MFA Žalgiris-MRU
12	GK	Malika Eminova	14 April 1997 (age 29)	(Football Federation of Turkmenistan) Lebap Region
14	FP	Dzhamilya Babayeva		(Football Federation of Turkmenistan) FC Altyn Tach
	FP	Amaliýa Karapetýans		(Football Federation of Turkmenistan) FC Altyn Tach
	FP	Suraý Mämmetsähedowa		(Russian Football Union) FC Torpedo-MAMI

== Coaching staff ==
=== Current coaching staff ===
As of 7 January 2025

Role	Name
Head coach	(Turkmenistan) Kamil Mingazow
Goalkeeping coach	
Physical coach	

=== Manager history ===
As of 7 January 2025

Name	Period	Ref.
(Turkmenistan) Kamil Mingazow	2016–	

== Competitive record ==
=== FIFA Women's Futsal World Cup ===
FIFA Women's World Cup record
Year	Result	GP	W	D*	L	GS	GA	GD	Squad	Coach
(Philippines) 2025	Did not qualify									
Total	0/0	–	–	–	–	–	–	–		

*Draws include knockout matches decided on penalty kicks.

=== AFC Women's Futsal Asian Cup ===
AFC Women's Futsal Asian Cup record
Year	Result	GP	W	D*	L	GS	GA	GD	Squad	Coach
(Malaysia) 2015	Did not enter									
(Thailand) 2018	Group stage	2	0	0	2	1	17	−16	Squad	Kamil Mingazow
(China) 2025	Did not qualify									
Total	1/2	2	0	0	2	1	17	−16		

*Draws include knockout matches decided on penalty kicks.

=== CAFA Women's Futsal Championship ===
CAFA Women's Futsal Championship record
Year	Result	GP	W	D*	L	GS	GA	GD	Squad	Coach
(Tajikistan) 2022	Did not enter									
(Uzbekistan) 2023	Did not enter									
(Tajikistan) 2023	Fourth place	4	1	0	3	7	17	−10	Squad	Kamil Mingazow
Total	1/3	4	1	0	3	7	17	−10		

*Draws include knockout matches decided on penalty kicks.

=== Asian Indoor and Martial Arts Games ===
Asian Indoor and Martial Arts Games record
Year	Result	GP	W	D*	L	GS	GA	GD	Squad	Coach
(Thailand) 2005	Did not enter									
(Macau) 2007	Did not enter									
(Vietnam) 2009	Did not enter									
(South Korea) 2013	Did not enter									
(Turkmenistan) 2017	Group stage	3	0	0	3	2	17	−15	Squad	
(Thailand) 2021	To be determined									
Total	0/0	–	–	–	–	–	–	–		

*Draws include knockout matches decided on penalty kicks.

== See also ==
- Turkmenistan women's national football team
- Turkmenistan national men's futsal team
