= 2023 CAFA Women's Futsal Championship =

CAFA Women's Futsal Championship 2023
Чемпионат CAFA-2023 по футзалу среди женских национальных сборных

Tournament details
- Host country: Uzbekistan
- City: Tashkent
- Dates: 27–31 January
- Teams: 4 (from 1 sub-confederation)
- Venue: 1 (in 1 host city)

Final positions
- Champions: Iran (2nd title)
- Runners-up: Uzbekistan
- Third place: Tajikistan

Tournament statistics
- Matches played: 6
- Goals scored: 51 (8.5 per match)
- Attendance: 500 (83 per match)
- Top scorer(s): (Iran) Sara Shirbeigi (7 Goals)
- Best player: (Iran) Fereshteh Karimi
- Fair play award: Tajikistan
- All statistics correct as of 28 January 2023.

The 2023 CAFA Women's Futsal Championship was the second edition of CAFA Women's Futsal Championship, the annual international futsal championship organized by CAFA for the women's national futsal teams of Central Asia. the tournament was hosted in Tashkent, Uzbekistan.

Iran were the defending champion having won the 2022 inaugural edition. and they successfully defended their title finishing unbeaten, after beating hosts Uzbekistan in an exciting final day.

== participation ==
=== Participating teams ===
A total of 4 (out of 6) CAFA member national teams entered the tournament.

Team	Appearance	Previous best performance
Iran	2nd	Champions (2022)
Kyrgyz Republic	2nd	Third place (2022)
Tajikistan	2nd	Fourth place (2022)
Uzbekistan	2nd	Runners-up (2022)

Did not enter

- Afghanistan
- Turkmenistan

=== Squads ===
Each national team has to submit a squad of 14 players, two of whom must be goalkeepers.

== Match officials ==
Eight referees from the four participating associations were appointed for the tournament.

Referees

- (Iran) Zahra Rahimi
- (Iran) Somayeh Taheri
- (Kyrgyzstan) Nurbek Arstanbek Uulu
- (Kyrgyzstan) Talantbek Raimberdiev
- (Tajikistan) Safarali Mahmadizoda
- (Tajikistan) Behzur Murtazoev
- (Uzbekistan) Aleksandra Konchikova
- (Uzbekistan) Gulshoda Saitkulova

== Main Tournament ==
The final tournament schedule was confirmed on 18 January 2023.

All times are local UZT (UTC+5).

=== Tournament table ===
Pos	Team	Pld	W	D	L	GF	GA	GD	Pts	Final result
1	Iran	3	3	0	0	26	4	+22	9	Champions
2	Uzbekistan (H)	3	2	0	1	17	7	+10	6	Runners-up
3	Tajikistan	3	1	0	2	5	25	−20	3	Third place
4	Kyrgyz Republic	3	0	0	3	3	15	−12	0	

Source: CAFA
Rules for classification: 1) Points; 2) head-to-head matches; 3) Goal difference; 4) Number of goals scored.
(H) Hosts
27 January 2023
14:00

Iran	5–0	Kyrgyz Republic
Karimi 3:15; Kurmanbekova 3:49 (o.g.); Torkaman 4:19; Kamali 7:09 (pen.); Rahmati 24:38	Report

Yunusabad Sports Complex, Tashkent
Attendance: 42
Referee: Aleksandra Konchikova (Uzbekistan)
Gulshoda Saitkulova (Uzbekistan)
Behzur Murtazoev (Tajikistan)
27 January 2023
17:00

Uzbekistan	7–1	Tajikistan
Burkhonova 2:55; Zoirova 9:32, 15:15; Amirova 16:49, 36:10; Shoyimova 17:16, 20:13	Report	Fozilova 6:08

Yunusabad Sports Complex, Tashkent
Attendance: 67
Referee: Zahra Rahimi (Iran)
Somayeh Taheri (Iran)
Nurbek Arstanbek Uulu (Kyrgyz Republic)

28 January 2023
14:00

Tajikistan	0–16	Iran
	Report	Kamali 6:31; Shirbeigi 7:11, 9:13, 9:19, 11:33, 15:57; Anafjeh 14:06; Khudododova 14:31 (o.g.); Moghimifarzi 16:11; Karimi 20:37, 23:38, 38:35; Fayzulloeva 21:34 (o.g.); Karami (red card) 25:44'; Estekifar 31:26; Torkaman 36:04; Afrough 39:57

Yunusabad Sports Complex, Tashkent
Attendance: 52
Referee: Talantbek Raimberdiev (Kyrgyz Republic)
Nurbek Arstanbek Uulu (Kyrgyz Republic)
Aleksandra Konchikova (Uzbekistan)
28 January 2023
17:00

Kyrgyz Republic	1–6	Uzbekistan
Askarova 37:40	Report	Shoyimova 3:29; Amirova 8:01; Turdiboeva 8:52; Karachik 19:26, 33:59; Burkhanova 34:31

Yunusabad Sports Complex, Tashkent
Attendance: 110
Referee: Behzur Murtazoev (Tajikistan)
Safarali Mahmadizoda (Tajikistan)
Somayeh Taheri (Iran)

30 January 2023
14:00

Kyrgyz Republic	2–4	Tajikistan
Boronbekova 25:31; Yrysbek Kyzy 28:43	Report	Qurbonova 14:22; Khudododova 27:05; Mirzoeva 27:45, 34:36

Yunusabad Sports Complex, Tashkent
Attendance: 32
Referee: Zahra Rahimi (Iran)
Somayeh Taheri (Iran)
Gulshoda Saitkulova (Uzbekistan)
30 January 2023
17:00

Uzbekistan	4–5	Iran
Amirova 4:06, 32:07; Karachik 22:52, 25:24	Report	Shirbeigi 7:50, 16:10; Kamali 11:00, 35:50; Karimi 34:31

Yunusabad Sports Complex, Tashkent
Attendance: 197
Referee: Behzur Murtazoev (Tajikistan)
Talantbek Raimberdiev (Kyrgyz Republic)
Nurbek Arstanbek Uulu (Kyrgyz Republic)

== Goalscorers ==
There were 51 goals scored in 6 matches, for an average of 8.5 goals per match.

7 goals

- (Iran) Sara Shirbeigi

5 goals

- (Iran) Fereshteh Karimi
- (Uzbekistan) Gulzoda Amirova

4 goals

- (Iran) Mahsa Kamali
- (Uzbekistan) Lyudmila Karachik

3 goals

- (Uzbekistan) Maftuna Shoyimova

2 goals

- (Iran) Maral Torkaman
- (Tajikistan) Karina Mirzoeva
- (Uzbekistan) Umida Zoirova
- (Uzbekistan) Malika Burkhanova

1 goal

- (Iran) Seyedehnastaran Moghimifarzi
- (Iran) Nazanin Estekifar
- (Iran) Fatemeh Rahmati
- (Iran) Elham Anafjeh
- (Iran) Ziba Afrough
- (Kyrgyzstan) Aiturgan Askarova
- (Kyrgyzstan) Aizhan Boronbekova
- (Kyrgyzstan) Kenzhebubu Yrysbek Kyzy
- (Tajikistan) Madina Fozilova
- (Tajikistan) Jonona Qurbonova
- (Tajikistan) Nekubakht Khudododova
- (Uzbekistan) Feruza Turdiboeva

1 own goal

- (Kyrgyzstan) Aiturgan Kurmanbekova (against Iran)
- (Tajikistan) Nekubakht Khudododova (against Iran)
- (Tajikistan) Marjona Fayzulloeva (against Iran)

== Player awards ==
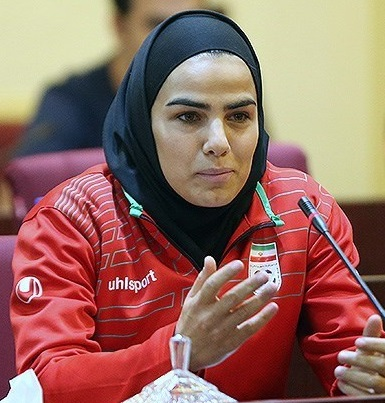
Iran's Fereshteh Karimi won the Most Valuable Player Award for the second consecutive time, becoming the first to do so.

The following awards were given at the conclusion of the tournament:

Most Valuable player Award
(Iran) Fereshteh Karimi
Top Goalscorer Award
(Iran) Sara Shirbeigi
Fair Play Award
Tajikistan
Special Award
Kyrgyz Republic

== See also ==
- 2022 CAFA Women's Futsal Championship
