= Tajikistan women's national futsal team =

Women's national futsal team representing Tajikistan

Tajikistan
- Association: Tajikistan Football Federation (FFT)
- Confederation: Asian Football Confederation (AFC)
- FIFA code: TJK
- FIFA ranking: 70 (8 May 2026)
- Highest FIFA ranking: 69 (May 2024)
- Lowest FIFA ranking: 72 (October 2024)
Home colours	Away colours

First international
- Tajikistan 1–1 Kyrgyzstan (Dushanbe, Tajikistan; 21 February 2022)

Biggest win
- Tajikistan 4–2 Kyrgyzstan (Tashkent, Uzbekistan; 30 January 2023)

Biggest defeat
- Iran 16–0 Tajikistan (Tashkent, Uzbekistan; 28 January 2023)

CAFA Women's Futsal Championship
- Appearances: 3 (First in 2022)
- Best result: Third place (2023)

The Tajikistan women's national futsal team (Russian: Женская национальная сборная Таджикистана по футзалу) represents Tajikistan in international women's futsal competitions and is run by the Tajikistan Football Federation (FFT).

== History ==
The Tajik team made its debut when they hosted the inaugural CAFA Women's Futsal Championship in 2022. Their first match ended in a 1–1 draw against Kyrgyzstan. which was followed by five straight losses to finish in last place. In the 2023 edition, the team achieved their first international win with a 4–2 victory over Kyrgyzstan on 30 January. That tournament also saw their biggest loss, a 16–0 loss to Iran. Tajikistan went on to secure a historic third-place finish, their best in the tournament to date.

== Results and fixtures ==
The following is a list of match results in the last 12 months, as well as any future matches that have been scheduled.

Win Draw Loss Fixture

=== 2024 ===
5 February 2024 CAFA Championship	Kyrgyzstan	4–2	Tajikistan	Dushanbe, Tajikistan
19:00	Yrysbek Kyzy 06:20, 09:58; Marzakulova 08:19; Rysbekova 35:49	Report	Fayzulloeva 07:20; Rasulova 25:19	Stadium: Dushanbe Indoor Hall; Attendance: 200; Referee: Zahra Rahimi (Iran)

7 February 2024 CAFA Championship	Tajikistan	1–4	Turkmenistan	Dushanbe, Tajikistan
19:00	Rasulova 37:29	Report	Çaryýewa 03:16, 38:06; Mämedowa 36:21; Haipowa 37:40	Stadium: Dushanbe Indoor Hall; Attendance: 250; Referee: Talantbek Raimberdiev (Kyrgyz Republic)

9 February 2024 CAFA Championship	Uzbekistan	7–0	Tajikistan	Dushanbe, Tajikistan
19:00	Turdiboeva 10:47; Vokhidova 14:27, 15:23; Safina 20:08, 32:22; Valikhanova 36:05, 39:45	Report		Stadium: Dushanbe Indoor Hall; Attendance: 300; Referee: Talantbek Raimberdiev (Kyrgyz Republic)

11 February 2024 CAFA Championship	Tajikistan	0–9	Iran	Dushanbe, Tajikistan
19:00	Torkaman 01:56; Shirbeigi 03:47, 12:22, 14:17, 20:50, 36:24; Rahmati 07:52; Hosseini 15:43; Khosravi 36:42	Report		Stadium: Dushanbe Indoor Hall; Attendance: 253; Referee: Aleksandra Konchikova (Uzbekistan)

== Players ==
=== Current squad ===
The following 14 players were called for the 2024 CAFA Women's Futsal Championship held in Dushanbe from 2 to 12 February 2024.

No.	Pos.	Player	Date of birth (age)	Club
1	GK	Munisa Gulova	2 June 2000 (age 26)	
2	GK	Ruziguli Hasan	14 July 2003 (age 23)	
3	FP	Laylo Khalimova	16 November 1997 (age 28)	
4	FP	Karina Mirzoeva	12 March 2004 (age 22)	
5	FP	Benazir Jumakhonzoda	27 October 2001 (age 24)	
6	FP	Shamsiya Khuseinova	15 December 1996 (age 29)	
7	FP	Madina Yalieva		
8	FP	Niso Abdulloeva	24 December 2003 (age 22)	
9	FP	Nekubakht Khudododova	23 February 2002 (age 24)	
10	FP	Marjona Saidova	4 June 2002 (age 24)	
11	FP	Komila Rasulova	18 November 2001 (age 24)	
12	FP	Shukrona Azizulloeva		
13	FP	Marjona Fayzulloeva	4 September 2000 (age 26)	
14	FP	Jonona Qurbonova	18 July 2000 (age 26)	

=== Previous squads ===
CAFA Women's Futsal Championship

- 2022 CAFA Women's Futsal Championship squad
- 2023 CAFA Women's Futsal Championship squad

== Competitive record ==
=== FIFA Futsal Women's World Cup ===
FIFA Futsal Women's World Cup record									Qualification record						
Host nation(s) and year	Round	Pos	Pld	W	D	L	GF	GA	Outcome	Pld	W	D	L	GF	GA
(Philippines) 2025	Did not enter								Did not enter						
Total	0/1	–	–	–	–	–	–	–	Total	–	–	–	–	–	–

=== AFC Women's Futsal Asian Cup ===
AFC Women's Futsal Asian Cup record								Qualification record						
Host nation(s) and year	Round	Pld	W	D	L	GF	GA	Outcome	Pld	W	D	L	GF	GA
(Malaysia) 2015	Did not enter							Did not enter						
(Thailand) 2018	Did not enter							Did not enter						
(China) 2025	Did not enter							Did not enter						
Total	0/3	–	–	–	–	–	–	Total	–	–	–	–	–	–

=== CAFA Women's Futsal Championship ===
CAFA Women's Futsal Championship record
Year	Result	GP	W	D*	L	GS	GA	GD	Squad	Coach
(Tajikistan) 2022	Fourth place	6	0	1	5	3	39	−36	squad	Shamshod Niyatbekov
(Uzbekistan) 2023	Third place	3	1	0	2	5	25	−20	squad	(Iran) Mostafa Afshari
(Tajikistan) 2024	Fifth place	4	0	0	4	3	24	−21	Squad	(Iran) Mostafa Afshari
Total	3/3	13	1	1	11	11	88	−77		

*Draws include knockout matches decided on penalty kicks.

== See also ==
- Tajikistan national futsal team
