= Futsal at the 2017 Asian Indoor and Martial Arts Games =

- Venue: Ice Arena
- Dates: 16–26 September 2017

The futsal competitions at the 2017 Asian Indoor and Martial Arts Games in Ashgabat took place at the Ice Palace in Ashgabat.

== Medalists ==
Event	Gold	Silver	Bronze
Men	Iran; Sepehr Mohammadi; Alireza Samimi; Mohammad Shajari; Alireza Rafieipour; Hamid Ahmadi; Mohammad Reza Sangsefidi; Ali Asghar Hassanzadeh; Abolghasem Orouji; Saeid Ahmadabbasi; Hossein Tayyebi; Ahmad Esmaeilpour; Moslem Oladghobad; Farhad Tavakkoli; Mehdi Javid	Uzbekistan; Rustam Umarov; Anaskhon Rakhmatov; Mashrab Adilov; Feruz Fakhriddinov; Timur Sadirov; Ilhomjon Hamroev; Dilshod Rakhmatov; Farkhod Abdumavlyanov; Davronjon Abdurakhmonov; Davron Choriev; Artur Yunusov; Akmaljon Khazratkulov; Khusniddin Nishonov; Konstantin Sviridov	Japan; Taku Miura; Daimu Yazawa; Shinsuke Hara; Kasho Tamura; Shota Horigome; Koto Uematsu; Kiyoto Yagi; Koichi Saito; Takashi Morimura; Yuki Murota; Kazuya Shimizu; Takuya Uehara; Masaya Hashimoto; Atsuya Uemura
Women	Thailand; Ariya Kritsawong; Suchada Wapeena; Jenjira Bubpha; Sawitree Mamyalee; Hataichanok Tappakun; Jiraprapa Tupsuri; Pacharaporn Srimuang; Mutita Senkram; Jiraprapa Nimrattanasing; Siranya Srimanee; Nattamon Artkla; Pannipa Kamolrat; Darika Peanpailun; Sasicha Phothiwong	Japan; Ringo Maehara; Masami Kato; Eriko Hotta; Mio Fujita; Ryo Egawa; Chihiro Tanaka; Junko Takemura; Miku Sakurada; Minako Sekinada; Shiori Nakajima; Kana Kitagawa; Ayaka Yamamoto; Akari Takao; Mutsumi Sakata	Iran; Farzaneh Tavassoli; Tahereh Mehdipour; Leila Khodabandehloo; Fatemeh Arjangi; Sara Shirbeigi; Fereshteh Khosravi; Fereshteh Karimi; Fatemeh Papi; Soheila Malmoli; Nasimeh Gholami; Nastaran Moghimi; Fahimeh Zareei; Fatemeh Etedadi; Arezoo Sadaghianizadeh

== Medal table ==
Rank	Nation	Gold	Silver	Bronze	Total
1	Iran (IRI)	1	0	1	2
2	Thailand (THA)	1	0	0	1
3	Japan (JPN)	0	1	1	2
4	Uzbekistan (UZB)	0	1	0	1
Totals (4 entries)		2	2	2	6

== Results ==
=== Men ===
==== First round ====
===== Group A =====
Pos	Team	Pld	W	D	L	GF	GA	GD	Pts
1	Vietnam	4	3	0	1	12	3	+9	9
2	Turkmenistan	4	3	0	1	16	5	+11	9
3	Solomon Islands	4	2	0	2	11	10	+1	6
4	Hong Kong	4	1	0	3	7	21	−14	3
5	Chinese Taipei	4	1	0	3	8	15	−7	3

Source: OCA
16 September
16:45

Chinese Taipei	2–1	Vietnam
Lê Quốc Nam 17' (o.g.); Lai Ming-hui 28'		Ngô Ngọc Sơn 11'

Ice Arena, Ashgabat
Referee: Mahmoud Reza Nassirloo (Iran)

16 September
19:00

Solomon Islands	4–1	Hong Kong
Hou 3'; Sia 5'; Makau 25', 39'		Wong Yiu Fu 37'

Ice Arena, Ashgabat
Referee: Khamis Al-Shamsi (United Arab Emirates)

18 September
16:45

Solomon Islands	4–3	Chinese Taipei
Stevenson 2', 24'; Fa'arodo 13'; Hou 33'		Lin Chih-hung 6', 37'; Chi Sheng-fa 17'

Ice Arena, Ashgabat
Referee: Vahid Arzpeima (Iran)

18 September
19:00

Hong Kong	1–7	Turkmenistan
Liu Yik Shing 36'		Rejepow 3', 25'; Ataýew 14'; Meredow 20'; Annagulyýew 23'; Kurbanow 26'; Gurbannepesow 27'

Ice Arena, Ashgabat
Referee: Mohamad Chami (Lebanon)

19 September
16:45

Vietnam	8–0	Hong Kong
Lê Quốc Nam 7'; Nguyễn Minh Trí 8'; Vũ Đức Tùng 12'; Ngô Ngọc Sơn 16'; Phùng Trọng Luân 25'; Trần Thái Huy 32', 34'; Nguyễn Mạnh Dũng 37'

Ice Arena, Ashgabat
Referee: Mohamad Chami (Lebanon)

19 September
19:00

Turkmenistan	4–2	Solomon Islands
Orazmuhammedow 8'; Rejepow 11'; Hou 36' (o.g.); Soltanow 36'		Hou 17'; Makau 40'

Ice Arena, Ashgabat
Referee: Husain Ali Al-Bahhar (Bahrain)

20 September
16:45

Vietnam	2–1	Solomon Islands
Phạm Đức Hòa 4'; Phùng Trọng Luân 27'		Stevenson 40'

Ice Arena, Ashgabat
Referee: Khalil Balhawan (Lebanon)

20 September
19:00

Chinese Taipei	1–5	Turkmenistan
Lin Chih-hung 35'		Muhammetmyradow 14'; Kurbanow 18'; Orazmuhammedow 19'; Garajaýew 36'; Meredow 38'

Ice Arena, Ashgabat
Referee: Vahid Arzpeima (Iran)

21 September
16:45

Hong Kong	5–2	Chinese Taipei
Li Ka Chun 17'; Chow Ka Wa 26', 37', 37'; So Loi Keung 34'		Chi Sheng-fa 15'; Huang Tai-hsiang 40'

Ice Arena, Ashgabat
Referee: Anatoliy Rubakov (Uzbekistan)

21 September
19:00

Turkmenistan	0–1	Vietnam
		Ngô Ngọc Sơn 14'

Ice Arena, Ashgabat
Referee: Hawkar Salar (Iraq)

===== Group B =====
Pos	Team	Pld	W	D	L	GF	GA	GD	Pts
1	Afghanistan	4	4	0	0	20	7	+13	12
2	Uzbekistan	4	2	1	1	20	10	+10	7
3	United Arab Emirates	4	2	0	2	12	11	+1	6
4	China	4	1	1	2	15	18	−3	4
5	Maldives	4	0	0	4	6	27	−21	0

Source: OCA
16 September
16:45

Afghanistan	6–1	China
Hashemi 12', 38'; Haidari 14'; Kazemi 21', 22', 37'		Zhang Yameng 34'

Ice Arena, Ashgabat
Referee: Hawkar Salar (Iraq)

16 September
19:00

Maldives	1–3	United Arab Emirates
Imran 12'		Imran 16' (o.g.); Al-Shamsi 25'; Al-Fzari 38'

Ice Arena, Ashgabat
Referee: Nurdin Bukuev (Kyrgyzstan)

18 September
16:45

Maldives	1–6	Afghanistan
A. Ahmed 38'		Khademi 1', 29'; Fayazi 12'; Karimi 25'; Kazemi 33', 35'

Ice Arena, Ashgabat
Referee: Hasan Mohammed (Iraq)

18 September
19:00

United Arab Emirates	1–5	Uzbekistan
Al-Shamsi 19'		Yunusov 9'; Choriev 13'; Abdumavlyanov 20'; D. Rakhmatov 27'; Sviridov 34'

Ice Arena, Ashgabat
Referee: Mahmoud Reza Nassirloo (Iran)

19 September
16:45

China	1–5	United Arab Emirates
Zhao Liang 14'		Al-Shamsi 5'; Ibrahim 19'; Ah. Al-Hosani 24'; Al-Fzari 29'; Ab. Al-Hosani 37'

Ice Arena, Ashgabat
Referee: Helday Idang (Malaysia)

19 September
19:00

Uzbekistan	9–1	Maldives
Sviridov 3', 8'; Abdumavlyanov 3'; Nishonov 10', 35'; Choriev 24'; Fakhriddinov 35'; Hamroev 39'; Adilov 40'		Naseem 7'

Ice Arena, Ashgabat
Referee: Trương Quốc Dũng (Vietnam)

20 September
16:45

China	9–3	Maldives
Zhao Liang 6', 28'; Xu Yang 9'; Liu Chang 25'; Chen Zhiheng 30'; Lu Yue 33'; Liu Wenxi 34'; Li Jianjia 36'; Zeng Liang 36'		Furuqan 3', 40'; Naseem 32'

Ice Arena, Ashgabat
Referee: Ridzuan Rozali (Malaysia)

20 September
19:00

Afghanistan	4–2	Uzbekistan
Kazemi 5'; Hashemi 21'; Haidari 34'; Qurbani 36'		D. Rakhmatov 35'; Abdumavlyanov 38'

Ice Arena, Ashgabat
Referee: Husein Khalaileh (Jordan)

21 September
16:45

United Arab Emirates	3–4	Afghanistan
Obaid 4'; Al-Shamsi 17'; Ah. Al-Hosani 26'		Kazemi 23', 30', 39'; Khademi 37'

Ice Arena, Ashgabat
Referee: Mahmoud Reza Nassirloo (Iran)

21 September
19:00

Uzbekistan	4–4	China
Abdumavlyanov 3'; Hamroev 11'; Sadirov 23'; Fakhriddinov 32'		Zhuang Jianfa 2'; Xu Yang 13'; Lu Yue 23', 39'

Ice Arena, Ashgabat
Referee: Kim Jong-hee (South Korea)

===== Group C =====
Pos	Team	Pld	W	D	L	GF	GA	GD	Pts
1	Japan	2	2	0	0	11	6	+5	6
2	Thailand	2	1	0	1	9	8	+1	3
3	Lebanon	2	0	0	2	4	10	−6	0

Source: OCA
18 September
13:15

Japan	5–2	Lebanon
Uematsu 18'; Uemura 21'; Yagi 33'; Shimizu 34'; Horigome 36'		Tneich 19'; Kheireddine 22'

Ice Arena, Ashgabat
Referee: Nurdin Bukuev (Kyrgyzstan)

19 September
13:15

Lebanon	2–5	Thailand
Tneich 5', 40'		Thueanklang 3'; Chaemcharoen 6'; Wangsama-aeo 31'; Osamanmusa 37', 37'

Ice Arena, Ashgabat
Referee: An Ran (China)

21 September
11:00

Thailand	4–6	Japan
Thueanklang 14'; Osamanmusa 30', 34'; Sornwichian 35'		Tamura 6'; Murota 15'; Uemura 23'; Morimura 26'; Saito 30'; Shimizu 36'

Ice Arena, Ashgabat
Referee: Nurdin Bukuev (Kyrgyzstan)

===== Group D =====
Pos	Team	Pld	W	D	L	GF	GA	GD	Pts
1	Iran	3	3	0	0	33	4	+29	9
2	Jordan	3	2	0	1	13	8	+5	6
3	Kyrgyzstan	3	1	0	2	5	19	−14	3
4	Tahiti	3	0	0	3	3	23	−20	0

Source: OCA
18 September
11:00

Iran	16–1	Tahiti
Tavakkoli 4', 13', 13'; Esmaeilpour 8', 10', 17'; Ahmadabbasi 11'; Javid 16', 27', 30', 36'; Shajari 31', 32'; Hassanzadeh 33'; Tayyebi 35'; Ahmadi 39'		Tutavae 27'

Ice Arena, Ashgabat
Referee: Liu Jianqiao (China)

18 September
13:15

Kyrgyzstan	1–7	Jordan
Zholdubaev 26'		Al-Khazaleh 3', 35'; Abdrasul Uulu 7' (o.g.); Samara 22', 24'; Abu Arab 36'; Al-Kisswani 40'

Ice Arena, Ashgabat
Referee: Helday Idang (Malaysia)

19 September
11:00

Tahiti	2–4	Kyrgyzstan
Kaiha 27'; Manea 40'		Tursunov 2'; Abdrasul Uulu 23'; Tashtanov 32'; Isakov 33'

Ice Arena, Ashgabat
Referee: Lee Po-fu (Chinese Taipei)

19 September
13:15

Jordan	3–7	Iran
Shabib 33'; Gedan 37', 37'		Esmaeilpour 4', 22'; Orouji 6'; Tayyebi 16'; Javid 20', 28', 34'

Ice Arena, Ashgabat
Referee: Darius Turner (Australia)

21 September
11:00

Iran	10–0	Kyrgyzstan
Ahmadabbasi 10', 11', 19', 24', 32'; Tavakkoli 18', 25', 34'; Kadyrov 28' (o.g.); Esmaeilpour 39'

Ice Arena, Ashgabat
Referee: Rey Ritaga (Philippines)

21 September
13:15

Jordan	3–0	Tahiti
Al-Kisswani 34'; Al-Hafi 37'; Al-Khazaleh 38'

Ice Arena, Ashgabat
Referee: Lee Po-fu (Chinese Taipei)

==== Knockout round ====
Quarterfinals
23 September
Iran	10
Thailand	4
23 September
Afghanistan (p)	5 (6)
Turkmenistan	5 (5)
23 September
Japan	4
Jordan	1
23 September
Vietnam	0
Uzbekistan	2

Semifinals
24 September
Iran	8
Afghanistan	2
24 September
Japan	3 (2)
Uzbekistan (p)	3 (3)

Gold medal match
26 September
Iran	7
Uzbekistan	1
Bronze medal match
26 September
Afghanistan	1 (1)
Japan (p)	1 (3)

===== Quarterfinals =====
23 September
11:00

Iran	10–4	Thailand
Sangsefidi 6'; Orouji 13'; Esmaeilpour 14', 20'; Tayyebi 18', 24', 29'; Hassanzadeh 18'; Javid 29'; Oladghobad 30'		Sornwichian 2', 33'; Phoonjungreed 10'; Chaemcharoen 40'

Ice Arena, Ashgabat
Referee: Trương Quốc Dũng (Vietnam)

23 September
13:00

Japan	4–1	Jordan
Murota 3', 36'; Uematsu 27'; Hashimoto 39'		Al-Khazaleh 11'

Ice Arena, Ashgabat
Referee: Ebrahim Mehrabi (Iran)

23 September
17:00

Afghanistan	5–5 (a.e.t.)	Turkmenistan
Fayazi 4', 9'; H. Jafari 14'; Haidari 28'; Karimi 47'		Sähedow 7'; Meredow 8'; Bäşimow 32'; Ataýew 38'; Garajaýew 47'
Penalties
Kazemi (penalty scored); A. Jafari (penalty scored); Haidari (penalty scored); Fayazi (penalty scored); H. Jafari (penalty scored); Qurbani (penalty scored)	6–5	(penalty scored) Soltanow; (penalty scored) Orazmuhammedow; (penalty scored) Annagulyýew; (penalty scored) Gurbannepesow; (penalty scored) Sähedow; (penalty missed) Garajaýew

Ice Arena, Ashgabat
Referee: Osama Saeed Sedaif (Bahrain)

23 September
19:00

Vietnam	0–2	Uzbekistan
		Choriev 6'; Abdumavlyanov 36'

Ice Arena, Ashgabat
Referee: An Ran (China)

===== Semifinals =====
24 September
17:00

Iran	8–2	Afghanistan
Esmaeilpour 4'; Orouji 5'; Tayyebi 8'; Ahmadabbasi 12'; Javid 14' (pen.), 36', 37'; Ahmadi 14'		Kazemi 18'; A. Jafari 25'

Ice Arena, Ashgabat
Referee: Nurdin Bukuev (Kyrgyzstan)

24 September
19:00

Japan	3–3 (a.e.t.)	Uzbekistan
Tamura 9'; Shimizu 27'; Hara 34'		Sviridov 20'; Abdurakhmonov 23'; Choriev 35'
Penalties
Hara (penalty scored); Hashimoto (penalty scored); Morimura (penalty missed); Uemura (penalty missed)	2–3	(penalty missed) Abdumavlyanov; (penalty scored) Fakhriddinov; (penalty scored) Sviridov; (penalty scored) Abdurakhmonov

Ice Arena, Ashgabat
Referee: Darius Turner (Australia)

===== Bronze medal match =====
26 September
17:00

Afghanistan	1–1	Japan
Kazemi 31'		Horigome 35'
Penalties
Kazemi (penalty missed); A. Jafari (penalty scored)	1–3	(penalty scored) Murota; (penalty scored) Yagi; (penalty scored) Hashimoto

Ice Arena, Ashgabat
Referee: Mahmoud Reza Nassirloo (Iran)

===== Gold medal match =====
26 September
19:00

Iran	7–1	Uzbekistan
Javid 4', 9', 32', 36'; Hassanzadeh 21', 37'; Ahmadi 31'		Choriev 29'

Ice Arena, Ashgabat
Referee: Husein Khalaileh (Jordan)

=== Women ===
==== First round ====
===== Group A =====
Pos	Team	Pld	W	D	L	GF	GA	GD	Pts
1	Japan	3	3	0	0	16	4	+12	9
2	China	3	2	0	1	10	7	+3	6
3	Hong Kong	3	1	0	2	9	9	0	3
4	Turkmenistan	3	0	0	3	2	17	−15	0

Source: OCA
16 September
11:00

Japan	5–2	China
Sakurada 1'; Fujita 12', 13'; Takao 16'; Hotta 24'		Dong Jiabao 13'; Fan Yuqiu 23'

Ice Arena, Ashgabat
Referee: Gelareh Nazemi (Iran)

16 September
13:15

Turkmenistan	1–6	Hong Kong
Amanmuhammedowa 22'		Chan Wing Sze 4', 18', 20'; Wong So Han 12'; Wong Shuk Fan 27', 28'

Ice Arena, Ashgabat
Referee: Tita Puspita Sari (Indonesia)

17 September
10:00

Hong Kong	2–3	Japan
Cheung Wai Ki 30', 38'		Sekinada 8'; Nakajima 16'; Takemura 23'

Ice Arena, Ashgabat
Referee: Husain Ali Al-Bahhar (Bahrain)

17 September
12:15

China	3–1	Turkmenistan
Dong Jiabao 5'; Li Jingjing 7', 38'		Fan Yuqiu 19' (o.g.)

Ice Arena, Ashgabat
Referee: Gelareh Nazemi (Iran)

20 September
11:00

China	5–1	Hong Kong
Fan Yuqiu 2'; Wang Ting 8'; Zhang Yue 14', 35'; Dong Jiabao 38'		Ng Wing Kum 10'

Ice Arena, Ashgabat
Referee: Gelareh Nazemi (Iran)

20 September
13:15

Turkmenistan	0–8	Japan
		Egawa 10', 16', 34', 36'; Takao 26'; Sakurada 31'; Tanaka 36'; Sakata 37'

Ice Arena, Ashgabat
Referee: Tita Puspita Sari (Indonesia)

===== Group B =====
Pos	Team	Pld	W	D	L	GF	GA	GD	Pts
1	Thailand	2	2	0	0	18	1	+17	6
2	Iran	2	1	0	1	16	3	+13	3
3	Palestine	2	0	0	2	2	32	−30	0

Source: OCA
16 September
11:00

Palestine	1–16	Iran
Shaheen 30'		Malmoli 5', 19', 38'; Shirbeigi 7', 11', 25'; Khosravi 10'; Karimi 11', 27', 29'; Papi 15'; Gholami 17', 21', 37'; Zareei 34'; Etedadi 35'

Ice Arena, Ashgabat
Referee: Azat Hajypolatow (Turkmenistan)

17 September
10:00

Thailand	16–1	Palestine
Peanpailun 2', 32', 37'; Nimrattanasing 5', 28'; Phothiwong 6', 15', 16', 35', 39', 39'; Bubpha 11', 24'; Mamyalee 13', 25', 38'		Shaheen 16'

Ice Arena, Ashgabat
Referee: Tita Puspita Sari (Indonesia)

20 September
11:00

Iran	0–2	Thailand
		Mamyalee 4' (pen.), 29'

Ice Arena, Ashgabat
Referee: Kumi Hiruma (Japan)

==== Knockout round ====
Semifinals
24 September
Japan	2
Iran	0
24 September
Thailand	4
China	1

Gold medal match
25 September
Japan	1
Thailand	3
Bronze medal match
25 September
Iran	5
China	1

===== Semifinals =====
24 September
11:00

Japan	2–0	Iran
Sakata 7', 25'

Ice Arena, Ashgabat
Referee: Hawkar Salar (Iraq)

24 September
13:00

Thailand	4–1	China
Peanpailun 2'; Phothiwong 7', 12'; Zhang Yue 29' (o.g.)		Fan Yuqiu 3'

Ice Arena, Ashgabat
Referee: Azat Hajypolatow (Turkmenistan)

===== Bronze medal match =====
25 September
17:00

Iran	5–1	China
Karimi 3', 21'; Shirbeigi 5', 10', 31'		Dong Jiabao 12'

Ice Arena, Ashgabat
Referee: Kumi Hiruma (Japan)

===== Gold medal match =====
25 September
19:00

Japan	1–3	Thailand
Takao 35'		Nimrattanasing 14'; Peanpailun 36'; Bubpha 39'

Ice Arena, Ashgabat
Referee: Tita Puspita Sari (Indonesia)

== Goalscorers ==
=== Men ===
15 goals

- Mehdi Javid (IRI)

11 goals

- Akbar Kazemi (AFG)

9 goals

- Ahmad Esmaeilpour (IRI)

7 goals

- Saeid Ahmadabbasi (IRI)

6 goals

- Farhad Tavakkoli (IRI)
- Hossein Tayyebi (IRI)

5 goals

- Farkhod Abdumavlyanov (UZB)
- Davron Choriev (UZB)

4 goals

- Ali Asghar Hassanzadeh (IRI)
- Nour Al-Khazaleh (JOR)
- Muhammad Osamanmusa (THA)
- Hamad Al-Shamsi (UAE)
- Konstantin Sviridov (UZB)

3 goals

- Mohammad Ali Fayazi (AFG)
- Jawad Haidari (AFG)
- Sayed Mehdi Hashemi (AFG)
- Hussein Khademi (AFG)
- Lu Yue (CHN)
- Zhao Liang (CHN)
- Chow Ka Wa (HKG)
- Hamid Ahmadi (IRI)
- Abolghasem Orouji (IRI)
- Yuki Murota (JPN)
- Kazuya Shimizu (JPN)
- Ali Tneich (LBN)
- Alwin Hou (SOL)
- Coleman Makau (SOL)
- George Stevenson (SOL)
- Jirawat Sornwichian (THA)
- Allaberdi Meredow (TKM)
- Serdar Rejepow (TKM)
- Lin Chih-hung (TPE)
- Ngô Ngọc Sơn (VIE)

2 goals

- Mohammad Reza Karimi (AFG)
- Xu Yang (CHN)
- Mohammad Shajari (IRI)
- Baha Al-Kisswani (JOR)
- Tamem Gedan (JOR)
- Ahmad Samara (JOR)
- Shota Horigome (JPN)
- Kasho Tamura (JPN)
- Koto Uematsu (JPN)
- Atsuya Uemura (JPN)
- Ibrahim Furuqan (MDV)
- Mohamed Nasid Ahmed Naseem (MDV)
- Apiwat Chaemcharoen (THA)
- Suphawut Thueanklang (THA)
- Watan Ataýew (TKM)
- Daýanç Garajaýew (TKM)
- Allamyrat Kurbanow (TKM)
- Röwşen Orazmuhammedow (TKM)
- Chi Sheng-fa (TPE)
- Talib Al-Fzari (UAE)
- Ahmed Al-Hosani (UAE)
- Feruz Fakhriddinov (UZB)
- Ilhomjon Hamroev (UZB)
- Khusniddin Nishonov (UZB)
- Dilshod Rakhmatov (UZB)
- Phùng Trọng Luân (VIE)
- Trần Thái Huy (VIE)

1 goal

- Ali Jafari (AFG)
- Hadi Jafari (AFG)
- Ali Reza Qurbani (AFG)
- Chen Zhiheng (CHN)
- Li Jianjia (CHN)
- Liu Chang (CHN)
- Liu Wenxi (CHN)
- Zeng Liang (CHN)
- Zhang Yameng (CHN)
- Zhuang Jianfa (CHN)
- Li Ka Chun (HKG)
- Liu Yik Shing (HKG)
- So Loi Keung (HKG)
- Wong Yiu Fu (HKG)
- Moslem Oladghobad (IRI)
- Mohammad Reza Sangsefidi (IRI)
- Ahmad Abu Arab (JOR)
- Majed Al-Hafi (JOR)
- Qais Shabib (JOR)
- Shinsuke Hara (JPN)
- Masaya Hashimoto (JPN)
- Takashi Morimura (JPN)
- Koichi Saito (JPN)
- Kiyoto Yagi (JPN)
- Manas Abdrasul Uulu (KGZ)
- Damir Isakov (KGZ)
- Aktai Tashtanov (KGZ)
- Arstanbek Tursunov (KGZ)
- Mirlan Zholdubaev (KGZ)
- Ahmad Kheireddine (LBN)
- Ali Riswan Ahmed (MDV)
- Mohamed Imran (MDV)
- Atana Fa'arodo (SOL)
- Marlon Sia (SOL)
- Teivarii Kaiha (TAH)
- Raiarii Manea (TAH)
- Jacob Tutavae (TAH)
- Sorasak Phoonjungreed (THA)
- Warut Wangsama-aeo (THA)
- Mülkaman Annagulyýew (TKM)
- Abdy Bäşimow (TKM)
- Abdylla Gurbannepesow (TKM)
- Öwezbaý Muhammetmyradow (TKM)
- Gurbangeldi Sähedow (TKM)
- Maksat Soltanow (TKM)
- Huang Tai-hsiang (TPE)
- Lai Ming-hui (TPE)
- Abdalla Al-Hosani (UAE)
- Bader Ibrahim (UAE)
- Rashid Obaid (UAE)
- Davronjon Abdurakhmonov (UZB)
- Mashrab Adilov (UZB)
- Timur Sadirov (UZB)
- Artur Yunusov (UZB)
- Lê Quốc Nam (VIE)
- Nguyễn Mạnh Dũng (VIE)
- Nguyễn Minh Trí (VIE)
- Phạm Đức Hòa (VIE)
- Vũ Đức Tùng (VIE)

1 own goal

- Manas Abdrasul Uulu (KGZ) (against JOR)
- Dilshat Kadyrov (KGZ) (against IRI)
- Mohamed Imran (MDV) (against UAE)
- Alwin Hou (SOL) (against TKM)
- Lê Quốc Nam (VIE) (against TPE)

=== Women ===
8 goals

- Sasicha Phothiwong (THA)

6 goals

- Sara Shirbeigi (IRI)

5 goals

- Fereshteh Karimi (IRI)
- Sawitree Mamyalee (THA)
- Darika Peanpailun (THA)

4 goals

- Dong Jiabao (CHN)
- Ryo Egawa (JPN)

3 goals

- Fan Yuqiu (CHN)
- Chan Wing Sze (HKG)
- Nasimeh Gholami (IRI)
- Soheila Malmoli (IRI)
- Mutsumi Sakata (JPN)
- Akari Takao (JPN)
- Jenjira Bubpha (THA)
- Jiraprapa Nimrattanasing (THA)

2 goals

- Li Jingjing (CHN)
- Zhang Yue (CHN)
- Cheung Wai Ki (HKG)
- Wong Shuk Fan (HKG)
- Mio Fujita (JPN)
- Miku Sakurada (JPN)
- Natali Shaheen (PLE)

1 goal

- Wang Ting (CHN)
- Ng Wing Kum (HKG)
- Wong So Han (HKG)
- Fatemeh Etedadi (IRI)
- Fereshteh Khosravi (IRI)
- Fatemeh Papi (IRI)
- Fahimeh Zareei (IRI)
- Eriko Hotta (JPN)
- Shiori Nakajima (JPN)
- Minako Sekinada (JPN)
- Junko Takemura (JPN)
- Chihiro Tanaka (JPN)
- Ejeş Amanmuhammedowa (TKM)

1 own goal

- Fan Yuqiu (CHN) (against TKM)
- Zhang Yue (CHN) (against THA)
