= Iran women's national futsal team =

National sports team

Iran
- Nickname(s): Team Melli Futsale Zanan
- Association: IFF
- Confederation: AFC (Asia)
- Head coach: Shahrzad Mozaffar
- Captain: Nasimeh Gholami
- FIFA code: IRN
- FIFA ranking: 10 (24 September 2026)
Home colours	Away colours

First international
- Iran 17–8 Azerbaijan (Rasht, Iran; 27 October 2001)

Biggest win
- Iran 18–2 Philippines (Macau; 2 November 2007); Iraq 0–16 Iran (Amman, Jordan; 30 July 2008); Tajikistan 0–16 Iran (Tashkent, Uzbekistan; 28 Jaunrary 2023)

Biggest defeat
- Spain 7–0 Iran (Krasnogorsk, Russia; 6 May 2017)

FIFA Futsal Women's World Cup
- Appearances: 1 (First in 2025)
- Best result: Group stage (2025)

AFC Women's Futsal Asian Cup
- Appearances: 3 (First in 2015)
- Best result: Champions (2015, 2018)

Asian Indoor and Martial Arts Games
- Appearances: 4 (First in 2007)
- Best result: Silver medal (2013)

The Iran women's national futsal team represents Iran in international women's futsal, and is controlled by the Iran Football Federation.

== History ==
A national team representing Iran took part at the 2001 Women's Islamic Games an international multi-sporting event reserved for Muslim women.

Iran clinched the title for the first and second AFC Women's Futsal Championship in 2015 and 2018 respectively.

On 17 May 2025, Iran became the 16th and final women's national futsal team to qualify for the first-ever FIFA Futsal Women's World Cup to be staged in the Philippines.

== Results and fixtures ==
Win Draw Loss Fixture

Date	Venue	Opponent	Competition	Result
21 September 2015	Nilai, Malaysia	Hong Kong	2015 AFC Women's Futsal Championship	6–0 W
22 September 2015	Nilai, Malaysia	Uzbekistan	2015 AFC Women's Futsal Championship	9–1 W
23 September 2015	Nilai, Malaysia	Malaysia	2015 AFC Women's Futsal Championship	4–2 W
25 September 2015	Nilai, Malaysia	Thailand	2015 AFC Women's Futsal Championship	1–0 W
26 September 2015	Nilai, Malaysia	Japan	2015 AFC Women's Futsal Championship	1–0 W
26 October 2015	Tehran, Iran	Russia	Friendly match	2–4 L
27 October 2015	Tehran, Iran	Russia	Friendly match	4–0 W
24 November 2015	Guatemala City, Guatemala	Portugal	2015 Women's Futsal World Tournament	1–3 L
25 November 2015	Guatemala City, Guatemala	Brazil	2015 Women's Futsal World Tournament	0–6 L
27 November 2015	Guatemala City, Guatemala	Costa Rica	2015 Women's Futsal World Tournament	1–2 L
28 November 2015	Guatemala City, Guatemala	Japan	2015 Women's Futsal World Tournament	2–1 W
6 April 2016		Spain	Friendly match	0–5 L
7 April 2016		Russia	Friendly match	0–4 L
9 April 2016		Poland	Friendly match	2–1 W
15 October 2016		Russia	Friendly match	3–3 D
16 October 2016		Russia	Friendly match	3–5 L
6 May 2017	Krasnogorsk, Russia	Spain	Friendly match	0–7 L
7 May 2017	Krasnogorsk, Russia	Russia	Friendly match	0–4 L
9 May 2017	Krasnogorsk, Russia	Czech Republic	Friendly match	4–0 W
3 May 2018	Bangkok, Thailand	Turkmenistan	2018 AFC Women's Futsal Championship	14–0 W
7 May 2018	Bangkok, Thailand	Uzbekistan	2018 AFC Women's Futsal Championship	9–2 W
9 May 2018	Bangkok, Thailand	China	2018 AFC Women's Futsal Championship	4–2 W
10 May 2018	Bangkok, Thailand	Vietnam	2018 AFC Women's Futsal Championship	5–0 W
12 May 2018	Bangkok, Thailand	Japan	2018 AFC Women's Futsal Championship	5–2 W
6 May 2019	Krasnogorsk, Russia	Portugal	Friendly match	1–7 L
7 May 2019	Krasnogorsk, Russia	Russia	Friendly match	0–2 L
8 May 2019	Krasnogorsk, Russia	Spain	Friendly match	1–3 L
21 January 2022	Dushanbe, Tajikistan	Uzbekistan	2022 CAFA Women's Futsal Championship	5–2 W
22 January 2022	Dushanbe, Tajikistan	Tajikistan	2022 CAFA Women's Futsal Championship	12–0 W
24 January 2022	Dushanbe, Tajikistan	Kyrgyzstan	2022 CAFA Women's Futsal Championship	10–0 W
25 January 2022	Dushanbe, Tajikistan	Kyrgyzstan	2022 CAFA Women's Futsal Championship	5–0 W
27 January 2022	Dushanbe, Tajikistan	Uzbekistan	2022 CAFA Women's Futsal Championship	2–2 D
28 January 2022	Dushanbe, Tajikistan	Tajikistan	2022 CAFA Women's Futsal Championship	9–0 W
21 February 2022	Tehran, Iran	Russia	Friendly match	1–5 L
23 February 2022	Tehran, Iran	Russia	Friendly match	0–1 L

=== 2023 ===
27 January 2023 CAFA Futsal Championship	Iran	5–0	Kyrgyzstan	Tashkent, Uzbekistan
14:00 UTC+5	Karimi 3:15, 3:49; Torkaman 4:19; Kamali 7:09 (pen.); Rahmati 24:38			Stadium: Yunusabad Sports Complex; Referee: Aleksandra Konchikova (Uzbekistan)

28 January 2023 CAFA Futsal Championship	Tajikistan	0–16	Iran	Tashkent, Uzbekistan
14:00 UTC+5			Kamali 6:31; Shirbeigi 7:11, 9:13, 9:19, 11:33, 15:57, 23:28; Khosravi 14:06; Khudododova 14:31 (o.g.); Moghimifarzi 15:11; Karimi 20:37, 21:34, 38:35; Karami (red card) 25:44'; Estekifar 31:26; Torkaman 36:04; Rahmati 39:57	Stadium: Yunusabad Sports Complex; Referee: Talantbek Raimberdiev (Kyrgyz Republic)

31 January 2023 CAFA Futsal Championship	Uzbekistan	4–5	Iran	Tashkent, Uzbekistan
17:00 UTC+5	Amirova 3:06, 32:07; Karachik 22:52, 25:24		Shirbeigi 7:50, 15:10; Kamali 10:00, 34:50; Karimi 34:31	Stadium: Yunusabad Sports Complex; Referee: Behzur Murtazoev (Tajikistan)

12 March 2023 Nowruzgah International Tournament	Iran	4–1	Iran B	Tehran, Iran
--:-- UTC+3:30

13 March 2023 Nowruzgah International Tournament	Iran	0–4	Russia	Tehran, Iran
10:30 UTC+3:30		Report	Alemaykina 1'; Samoilova 20', 22'; Khlebosolova 29'	Stadium: Handball Hall

=== 2025 ===
7 May 2025 Asian Cup group B	Iran	1–0	Philippines	Hohhot Sports Centre, Hohhot
11:00	Torkaman 37'01"	Report		Attendance: 117; Referee: Liang Qingyun (China); Zhu Xin (China)

9 May 2025 Asian Cup group B	Hong Kong	1–3	Iran	Hohhot Sports Centre, Hohhot
17:00	Moghimidarzi 11'14" (o.g.)	Report	Anafjeh 8'50", 36'36"; Banaei 26'32"	Attendance: 117; Referee: Kana Saito (Japan); Kumi Hiruma (Japan)

11 May 2025 Asian Cup group B	Iran	0–0	Vietnam	Hohhot Sports Centre, Hohhot
17:00		Report		Attendance: 216; Referee: Reem Al-Bishi (Saudi Arabia); Najat Al-Blooshi (United Arab Emirates)

13 May 2025 Asian Cup quarter finals	Chinese Taipei	1–3 (a.e.t.)	Iran	Hohhot Sports Centre, Hohhot
20:00	Liu Wen-ling 17'41"	Report	Torkaman 1'32" (pen.); Khosravi 48'45"; Tavasoli 49'47"	Attendance: 273; Referee: Nurul Atikah Janah (Malaysia); Panadda Khotsenaphattra (Thailand)

15 May 2025 Asian Cup semi finals	Japan	3–2	Iran	Hohhot Sports Centre, Hohhot
20:00	Ikadai 2'10"; Takahashi 3'32"; Miyahara 29'19"	Report	Torkaman 23'19", 31'23"	Attendance: 418; Referee: Zhu Xin (China); Panadda Khotsenaphattra (Thailand)

17 May 2025 Asian Cup third place match	China	1–3	Iran	Hohhot Sports Centre, Hohhot
17:00	Cao Jiayi 20'57"	Report	Torkaman 15'10", 39'37"; Mehdi Pour 29'16"	Attendance: 2,013; Referee: Nurul Atikah Janah (Malaysia); Mari Yamamoto (Japan)

== Players ==
=== Current squad ===
The following players were called up to the squad for the 2025 FIFA Women's Futsal World Cup.

Head coach: Shahrzad Mozaffar

No.	Pos.	Player	Date of birth (age)	Club
1	GK	Farzaneh Tavassoli	January 19, 1987 (aged 38)	(Football Federation Islamic Republic of Iran) Esteghlal Tehran
2	FP	Shirin Saffar	May 5, 2005 (aged 20)	(Tajikistan Football Federation) New Super United FC
3	GK	Zahra Lotfabadi	January 11, 1995 (aged 30)	(Football Federation Islamic Republic of Iran) Palayesh Naft Abadan
4	DF	Fatemeh Rahmati	May 5, 1997 (aged 28)	(Football Federation Islamic Republic of Iran) Foolad Hormozgan
5	FP	Sara Shirbeigi	August 6, 1991 (aged 34)	(Football Federation Islamic Republic of Iran) Palayesh Naft Abadan
6	FP	Fereshteh Khosravi	April 11, 1996 (aged 29)	(Football Federation Islamic Republic of Iran) Foolad Khuzestan FC
7	FP	Fereshteh Karimi	February 6, 1989 (aged 36)	(Football Federation Islamic Republic of Iran) Foolad Hormozgan
8	FP	Elham Anafjeh	February 14, 1998 (aged 27)	(Football Federation Islamic Republic of Iran) Palayesh Naft Abadan
9	FP	Mahsa Kamali	August 5, 1994 (aged 31)	(Football Federation Islamic Republic of Iran) Sanat Mes Kerman
10	DF	Nasimeh Gholami	July 18, 1985 (aged 40)	(Football Federation Islamic Republic of Iran) Foolad Hormozgan
11	DF	Nastaran Moghimi	July 16, 1990 (aged 35)	(Football Federation Islamic Republic of Iran) Esteghlal Tehran
12	GK	Tahereh Mehdi Pour	August 19, 1996 (aged 29)	(Football Federation Islamic Republic of Iran) Sanat Mes Kerman
13	FP	Mahtab Banaei	March 25, 1997 (aged 28)	(Football Federation Islamic Republic of Iran) Esteghlal Tehran
14	FP	Maral Torkaman	November 26, 2002 (aged 22)	(Football Federation Islamic Republic of Iran) Esteghlal Tehran

== Competitive record ==
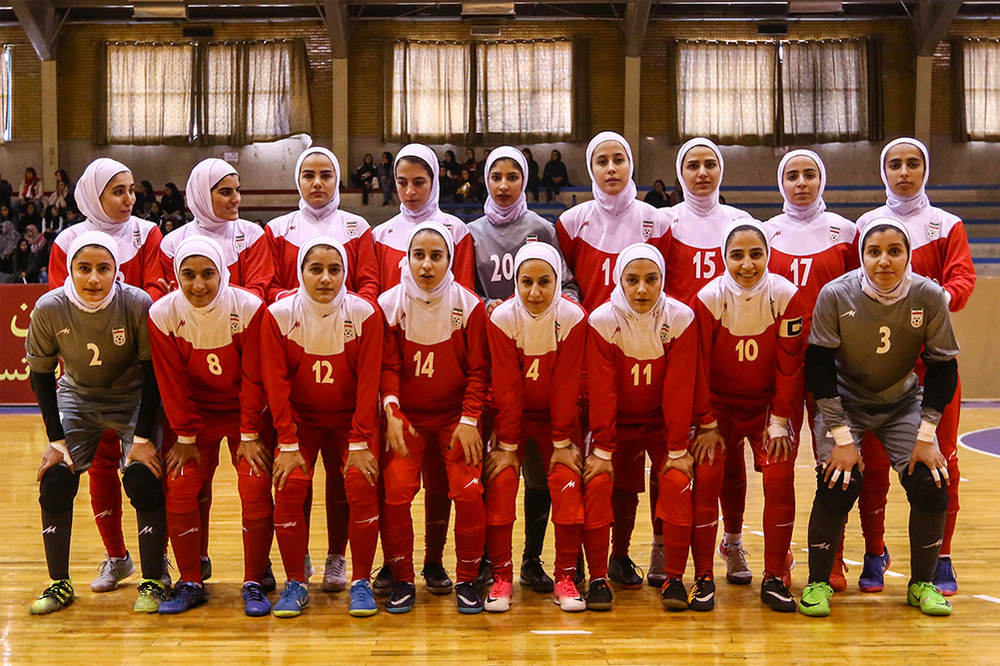
Iran women's national futsal team in 2019

*Draws include knockout matches decided on penalty kicks.
**Gold background colour indicates that the tournament was won.
***Red border colour indicates tournament was held on home soil.

Champions Runners-up Third Place Fourth place

=== FIFA Futsal Women's World Cup ===
World Cup Record
Year	Result	M	W	D	L	GF	GA	GD	Points
(Philippines) 2025	Group stage	3	1	0	2	8	9	–1	3
Total	1/1	3	1	0	2	8	9	–1	3

=== Futsal World Tournament ===
World Tournament Record
Year	Result	M	W	D	L	GF	GA	GD	Points
(Spain) 2010	Did not enter								
(Brazil) 2011	Did not enter								
(Portugal) 2012	7th place	5	2	0	3	9	15	–6	6
(Spain) 2013	5th place	4	2	0	2	17	13	+4	6
(Costa Rica) 2014	did not enter								
(Guatemala) 2015	7th place	4	1	0	3	4	12	–8	3
Total	3/6	13	5	0	8	30	40	–10	15

=== AFC Women's Futsal Asian Cup ===
Asian Cup Record
Year	Result	M	W	D	L	GF	GA	GD	Points
(Malaysia) 2015	Champions	5	5	0	0	21	3	+18	15
(Thailand) 2018	Champions	5	5	0	0	37	6	+31	15
(China) 2025	Third place	6	4	1	1	12	6	+6	13
Total	3/3	16	14	1	1	70	15	+55	43

- 2020 in (Kuwait) was cancelled due to the COVID-19 pandemic.

=== Asian Indoor and Martial Arts Games ===
Asian Indoor Games Record
Year	Result	M	W	D	L	GF	GA	GD	Points
(Thailand) 2005	Did not enter								
(Macau) 2007	5th place	5	3	0	2	56	20	+36	9
(Vietnam) 2009	Fourth place	4	2	0	2	14	10	+4	6
(South Korea) 2013	Runners-up	6	5	0	1	18	3	+15	15
(Turkmenistan) 2017	Third place	4	2	0	2	21	6	+15	6
(Saudi Arabia) 2026	To be determined								
Total	4/5	15	10	0	5	109	39	+70	36

- 2021 in (Thailand) was cancelled.

=== West Asian Championship ===
West Asian Championship Record
Year	Result	M	W	D	L	GF	GA	GD	Points
(Jordan) 2008	Champions	5	5	0	0	49	12	+37	15
(Bahrain) 2012	Champions	4	3	1	0	29	3	+26	10
2022–onwards	Not a WAFF member								
Total	2/3	9	8	1	0	78	15	+63	25

=== CAFA Women's Futsal Championship ===
Central Asian Championship Record
Year	Result	M	W	D	L	GF	GA	GD	Points
(Tajikistan) 2022	Champions	6	5	1	0	43	4	+39	16
(Uzbekistan) 2023	Champions	3	3	0	0	26	4	+22	9
(Tajikistan) 2024	Champions	4	4	0	0	34	1	+33	12
(Tajikistan) 2025	Champions	4	4	0	0	34	2	+32	12
(Tajikistan) 2026	Champions	2	2	0	0	13	1	+12	6
Total	5/5	19	18	1	0	150	12	+138	55

=== China Friendly Cup ===
China Cup Record
Year	Result	M	W	D	L	GF	GA	GD	Points
(China) 2024	Third place	3	1	1	1	12	10	+2	4
(China) 2026	Champions	4	3	0	1	19	4	+15	9
Total	2/2	7	4	1	2	31	14	+17	13

=== Thailand Friendly Cup ===
Thailand Cup Record
Year	Result	M	W	D	L	GF	GA	GD	Points
(Thailand) 2025	Runners-up	3	1	2	0	5	0	+5	5
Total	1/1	3	1	2	0	5	0	+5	5

=== Women's Islamic Games ===
Islamic Games Record
Year	Result	M	W	D	L	GF	GA	GD	Points
(Iran) 2001	Champions	3	3	0	0	59	10	+49	9
(Iran) 2005	Champions	4	4	0	0	104	2	+102	12
Total	2/2	7	7	0	0	163	12	+151	21

== See also ==
- Sport in Iran
  - Futsal in Iran
    - Women's futsal in Iran
- Iran men's national futsal team
- Fereshteh Karimi
- WAFF
