= Karina Mirzoeva =

Tajikistani footballer

Personal information
- Full name: Karina Mirzoeva
- Date of birth: 12 March 2004 (age 22)
- Place of birth: Dushanbe, Tajikistan
- Position: Defender

Team information
- Current team: WFC Zeboniso
- Number: 77

Senior career*
| Years | Team | Apps | (Gls) |
| 2018– | WFC Zeboniso | | |

International career^{‡}
| 2018–2019 | Tajikistan U16 | 4 | (0) |
| 2019– | Tajikistan U19 | 3 | (0) |
| 2019– | Tajikistan | 10 | (0) |
| 2022– | Tajikistan (futsal) | 9 | (2) |
- * Club domestic league appearances and goals as of 31 January 2023. ‡ National team caps and goals as of 31 January 2023.

Karina Mirzoeva (Russian: Карина Мирзоева; born 12 March 2004) is a Tajik football and futsal player who plays as a defender for Tajik women's football club Zeboniso in the Tajik women's league and the Tajikistan women's national football team.

== Club career ==
Mirzoeva has played for the women's football club of Zeboniso since 2018, when she was 14.

== International career ==
Mirzoeva was called up to the Tajik team for the first time in her career in 2019. At age 15, She played her first game in a (12–0) loss to Uzbekistan in the Cup of Hope hosted by the Kyrgyz Football Union.

Mirzoeva made the first-ever Tajikistan women's national futsal team in 2022 when they participated in the 2022 CAFA Women's Futsal Championship.

== Personal life ==
Mirzoeva is the ambassador of the international book society of the Tajik branch of Parimatch.

== Honours ==
=== Tajikistan (Futsal) ===
- CAFA Women's Futsal Championship:

Third place: 2023

=== Zeboniso ===
- Tajikistan women's Higher League:

Champions: 2018, 2020, 2022
Runners-up: 2019, 2021
