= Zahra Lotfabadi =

Iranian futsal player

Personal information
- Full name: Zahra Lotfabadi
- Date of birth: 11 January 1995 (age 31)
- Place of birth: Behshahr, Iran
- Position: Goalkeeper

Team information
- Current team: Atlético Torcal
- Number: 33

Senior career*
Years	Team	Apps	(Gls)
2012–2014	Dokhtaran Kavir Yazd		
2014–2016	Mes Kerman		
2016–2017	Mes Rafsanjan		
2018–2021	Heyat Football Khorasan Razavi		
2021	RISECO Safadasht		
2022	Sala Zaragoza		
2023	Atlético Torcal		
2024-present	Palayesh Naft Abadan		
- * Club domestic league appearances and goals

Zahra Lotfabadi (Persian: زهرا لطف‌آبادی; born 11 January 1995) is an Iranian professional futsal player. Lotfabadi started her career in women's futsal field since 2006 and was invited to the Iranian women's national futsal team camp for the first time in 2016.She is currently one of Iran's futsal legionaries who is active in the Spanish women's futsal league.

Lotfabadi is considered one of the fans of Persepolis F.C.

== Honours ==
- Runner-up with Mes Rafsanjan in Iran Women's Premier Futsal League
- 3rd place with Heyat Football Khorasan Razavi in the Iran Women's Premier Futsal League
- Champion with the Sala Zaragoza in the Spanish Aragon Cup in 2022
- Winning the championship with the Atlético Torcal
- Championship with the Palayesh Naft Abadan in the Iran Women's Premier Futsal League 2024
- Championship with the Palayesh Naft Abadan in the Iran Women's Premier Futsal League 2025
- Champion in the CAFA Women's Futsal Championship (Tajikistan 2025)
