= 2022 CAFA Women's Futsal Championship =

CAFA Women's Futsal Championship 2022
Tournament details
- Host country: Tajikistan
- City: Dushanbe
- Dates: 21–28 January
- Teams: 4 (from 1 confederation)
- Venue(s): 1 (in 1 host city)

Final positions
- Champions: Iran (1st title)
- Runners-up: Uzbekistan
- Third place: Kyrgyzstan

Tournament statistics
- Matches played: 12
- Goals scored: 89 (7.42 per match)
- Attendance: 1,484 (124 per match)
- Top scorer(s): (Uzbekistan) Maftuna Shoyimova (10 goals)
- Best player(s): (Iran) Fereshteh Karimi
- Best goalkeeper: (Iran) Farzaneh Tavasoli
- Fair play award: Iran

The 2022 CAFA Women's Futsal Championship was the inaugural edition of CAFA Women's Futsal Championship, the annual international futsal championship organized by CAFA for the women's national futsal teams of Central Asia.

Iran won the title to become the first CAFA Women's Futsal Championship champions.

== Participating nations ==
A total of 4 (out of 6) CAFA member national teams entered the tournament.

| Team | Appearance | Previous best performance |
|---|---|---|
| Iran | 1st | — |
| Kyrgyzstan | 1st | — |
| Tajikistan | 1st | — |
| Uzbekistan | 1st | — |

Did not enter

- Afghanistan
- Turkmenistan

== Format ==
As the inaugural tournament saw 4 countries participating. A double round-robin format was used for the tournament. with two games each matchday.

Tiebreakers

Teams are ranked according to points (3 points for a win, 1 point for a draw, 0 points for a loss), and if tied on points, the following tiebreaking criteria are applied, in the order given, to determine the rankings (Regulations Article 10.5):

1. Points in head-to-head matches among tied teams;
2. Goal difference in head-to-head matches among tied teams;
3. Goals scored in head-to-head matches among tied teams;
4. If more than two teams are tied, and after applying all head-to-head criteria above, a subset of teams are still tied, all head-to-head criteria above are reapplied exclusively to this subset of teams;
5. Goal difference in all group matches;
6. Goals scored in all group matches;
7. Penalty shoot-out if only two teams are tied and they met in the last round of the group;
8. Disciplinary points (yellow card = 1 point, red card as a result of two yellow cards = 3 points, direct red card = 3 points, yellow card followed by direct red card = 4 points);

== Match officials ==
A total of 10 referees were appointed for the tournament.

Referees

- (Iran) Nasim Kiani Moghaddam
- (Iran) Zahra Rahimi
- (Kyrgyzstan) Chyngyz Mustafaev
- (Kyrgyzstan) Myrzabek Zhaparov
- (Kyrgyzstan) Talantbek Raimberdiev
- (Tajikistan) Natalia Sotnikova
- (Tajikistan) Rashid Saidtabarov
- (Tajikistan) Zukhal Khuchanazarova
- (Uzbekistan) Khusan Muzaffarov
- (Uzbekistan) Umid Pulatov

== Main Tournament ==
Times are TJT (UTC+5).

=== Tournament table ===
| Pos | Team | Pld | W | D | L | GF | GA | GD | Pts | Final result |
|---|---|---|---|---|---|---|---|---|---|---|
| 1 | Iran | 6 | 5 | 1 | 0 | 43 | 4 | +39 | 16 | Champions |
| 2 | Uzbekistan | 6 | 4 | 1 | 1 | 38 | 8 | +30 | 13 | Runners-up |
| 3 | Kyrgyzstan | 6 | 1 | 1 | 4 | 5 | 38 | −33 | 4 | Third place |
| 4 | Tajikistan (H) | 6 | 0 | 1 | 5 | 3 | 39 | −36 | 1 | |

Updated to match(es) played on unknown. Source: CAFA
Rules for classification: Tiebreakers
(H) Hosts
21 January 2022
15:00

| Uzbekistan | 2–5 | Iran |
|---|---|---|
| Shoyimova 32'; Kuchkarova 33' | Report (CAFA) | Zamanifard 6'; F. Papi 7'; Shirbeigi 21'; Karimi 23'; Ahadi 33' |

Dushanbe Indoor hall, Dushanbe
Attendance: 41
Referee: Chyngyz Mustafaev (Kyrgyz Republic)
Talantbek Raimberdiev (Kyrgyz Republic)
Zukhal Khuchanazarova (Tajikistan)
21 January 2022
18:00

| Tajikistan | 1–1 | Kyrgyzstan |
|---|---|---|
| Fozilova 34' | Report (CAFA) | Toktoboltova 28' |

Dushanbe Indoor hall, Dushanbe
Attendance: 115
Referee: Zahra Rahimi (IR Iran)
Nasim Kianiy Moghaddam (IR Iran)
Umid Pulatov (Uzbekistan)

22 January 2022
15:00

| Kyrgyzstan | 0–11 | Uzbekistan |
|---|---|---|
| | Report (CAFA) | Shoyimova 5', 33', 37'; Khikmatova 7'; Ergasheva 11', 34', 39'; Kudratova 14'; Nazarova 32'; Ergasheva 38'; Sharipova 39' |

Dushanbe Indoor hall, Dushanbe
Attendance: 50
Referee: Rashid Saidtabarov (Tajikistan)
Zukhal Khuchanazarova (Tajikistan)
Natalia Sotnikova (Tajikistan)
22 January 2022
18:00

| Iran | 12–0 | Tajikistan |
|---|---|---|
| F. Papi 6'; Khosravi 7', 40'; Karimi 10', 24'; Almadadi 17'; Abdulloeva 19' (o.g.); Shirbeigi 21', 24', 32'; S. Papi 35', 36' | Report (CAFA) |

Dushanbe Indoor hall, Dushanbe
Attendance: 200
Referee: Khusan Muzaffarov (Uzbekistan)
Myrzabek Zhaparov (Kyrgyz Republic)
Umid Pulatov (Uzbekistan)

24 January 2022
15:00

| Kyrgyzstan | 0–10 | Iran |
|---|---|---|
| | Report (CAFA) | Shirbeigi 2'; Moghimifarzi 5', 36'; Rahmati 8'; Zamanifard 7'; Ahadi 11'; Karimi 13', 38'; S. Papi 20'; Khosravi 33' |

Dushanbe Indoor hall, Dushanbe
Attendance: 50
Referee: Umid Pulatov (Uzbekistan)
Natalia Sotnikova (Tajikistan)
Rashid Saidtabarov (Tajikistan)
24 January 2022
18:00

| Tajikistan | 1–8 | Uzbekistan |
|---|---|---|
| Kurbonova 35' | Report (CAFA) | Kudratova 1', 33'; Shoyimova 2', 9', 22'; Ergasheva 4', 30'; Nazarova 29' |

Dushanbe Indoor hall, Dushanbe
Attendance: 153
Referee: Talantbek Raimberdiev (Kyrgyz Republic)
Myrzabek Zhaparov (Kyrgyz Republic)
Zahra Rahimi (IR Iran)

25 January 2022
15:00

| Iran | 5–0 | Kyrgyzstan |
|---|---|---|
| S. Papi 5'; Rahmati 6'; Moghimifarzi 14'; Karimi 32'; Shirbeigi 33' | Report (CAFA) |

Dushanbe Indoor hall, Dushanbe
Attendance: 55
Referee: Zukhal Khuchanazarova (Tajikistan)
Rashid Saidtabarov (Tajikistan)
Natalia Sotnikova (Tajikistan)
25 January 2022
18:00

| Uzbekistan | 5–0 | Tajikistan |
|---|---|---|
| Kudratova 14'; Ergasheva 20', 27'; Shoyimova 23'; Kuchkarova 35' | Report (CAFA) |

Dushanbe Indoor hall, Dushanbe
Attendance: 180
Referee: Nasim Kiani Moghaddam (IR Iran)
Chyngyz Mustafaev (Kyrgyz Republic)
Talantbek Raimberdiev (Kyrgyz Republic)

27 January 2022
15:00

| Iran | 2–2 | Uzbekistan |
|---|---|---|
| Moghimifarzi 30', 37' | Report (CAFA) | Kudratova 12'; Shoyimova 37' |

Dushanbe Indoor hall, Dushanbe
Attendance: 100
Referee: Myrzabek Zhaparov (Kyrgyz Republic)
Natalia Sotnikova (Tajikistan)
Talantbek Raimberdiev (Kyrgyz Republic)
27 January 2022
18:00

| Kyrgyzstan | 4–1 | Tajikistan |
|---|---|---|
| Dorofeeva 2'; Kumyshbek 13'; Otorbaeva 31', 40' | Report (CAFA) | Askarova 9' (o.g.) |

Dushanbe Indoor hall, Dushanbe
Attendance: 175
Referee: Zahra Rahimi (IR Iran)
Umid Pulatov (Uzbekistan)
Nasim Kiani Moghaddam (IR Iran)

28 January 2022
15:00

| Uzbekistan | 10–0 | Kyrgyzstan |
|---|---|---|
| Shoyimova 1'; Nazarova 11', 21'; Khikmatova 14'; Sharipova 17'; Kudratova 22', 30'; Askarova 28' (o.g.); Norboeva 38'; Ergasheva 39' | Report (CAFA) |

Dushanbe Indoor hall, Dushanbe
Attendance: 65
Referee: Nasim Kiani Moghaddam (IR Iran)
Zukhal Khuchanazarova (Tajikistan)
Zahra Rahimi (IR Iran)
28 January 2022
18:00

| Tajikistan | 0–9 | Iran |
|---|---|---|
| | Report (CAFA) | Moghimifarzi 14'; Shirbeigi 16', 29'; Karimi 17', 18', 33'; Ahadi 20'; Alimadadi 22'; S. Papi 28' |

Dushanbe Indoor hall, Dushanbe
Attendance: 300
Referee: Chyngyz Mustafaev (Kyrgyz Republic)
Khusan Muzaffarov (Uzbekistan)
Talantbek Raimberdiev (Kyrgyz Republic)

== Champion ==
2022 CAFA Women's Futsal Championship

Iran
First title

== Player awards ==
The following awards were given at the conclusion of the tournament:

| Top Goalscorer | Best player | Best Goalkeeper |
|---|---|---|
| (Uzbekistan) Maftuna Shoyimova (10 goals) | (Iran) Fereshteh Karimi | (Iran) Farzaneh Tavasoli |

== Goalscorers ==
There were 89 goals scored in 12 matches, for an average of 7.42 goals per match.

10 goals

- (Uzbekistan) Maftuna Shoyimova

9 goals

- (Iran) Fareshteh Karimi

8 goals

- (Iran) Sara Shirbeigi

7 goals

- (Uzbekistan) Nilufar Kudratova

6 goals

- (Iran) Seyedehnastaran Moghimifarzi

5 goals

- (Iran) Sahar Papi
- (Uzbekistan) Dildora Ergasheva

4 goals

- (Uzbekistan) Zumratjon Nazarova
- (Uzbekistan) Nozimakhon Ergasheva

3 goals

- (Iran) Fareshteh Khosravi
- (Iran) Nesa Ahadi

2 goals

- (Iran) Fatemeh Papi
- (Iran) Sahar Zamanifard
- (Iran) Fatemeh Rahmati
- (Kyrgyzstan) Aidana Otorbaeva
- (Uzbekistan) Ugiloy Kuchkarova
- (Uzbekistan) Madina Khikmatova
- (Uzbekistan) Ezoza Sharipova
- (Iran) Masha Almadadi

1 goal

- (Kyrgyzstan) Bakhygul Toktoboltova
- (Kyrgyzstan) Irina Dorofeeva
- (Kyrgyzstan) Nazik Kumyshbek Kyzy
- (Tajikistan) Madina Fozilova
- (Tajikistan) Dzhonona Kurbonova
- (Uzbekistan) Aziza Norboeva

1 own goal

- (Tajikistan) Niso Abdulloeva (against Iran)

2 own goals

- (Kyrgyzstan) Aiturgan Askarova (against Tajikistan and Uzbekistan)

== See also ==
- 2022 WAFF Women's Futsal Championship
