= Maýa Musaskaýa =

Turkmen footballer (born 2000)

Personal information
- Full name: Maýa Begenjowna Musaskaýa
- Date of birth: 16 January 2000 (age 26)
- Place of birth: Ashgabat, Turkmenistan
- Position: Midfielder

Senior career*
Years	Team	Apps	(Gls)
2022–2023	Dudullu Spor	12	(1)
2023–2025	MFA Žalgiris	55	(7)

International career^{‡}
2017–	Turkmenistan (futsal)	11	(0)
2019–2023	Turkmenistan U23	4	(0)
2019–	Turkmenistan	9	(0)
- * Club domestic league appearances and goals ‡ National team caps and goals as of 9 April 2026

Maýa Begenjowna Musaskaýa (born 6 January 2000) is a Turkmen professional footballer who plays as a midfielder for Lithuanian Moterų A lyga club MFA Žalgiris and the Turkmenistan national team.

== Club career ==
=== Dudullu Spor ===
Musaskaýa began her senior career in 2022 by signing with Dudullu Spor in the Turkish Women's Football Super League, becoming the first Turkmen woman to play professionally and abroad. On 30 October 2022, she debuted for the team in a 1–1 draw to Beşiktaş.

=== MFA Žalgiris ===
Musaskaýa moved to MFA Žalgiris in the Lithuanian Women's A League for the 2023 season. On 27 February she made her debut for the club in a 2–1 against FK Vilnius. On 15 May 2023, she scored her first goal for the club; scoring in the 41st minute against FK Banga Gargždai. In March 2024, it was announced by the club that the contract was renewed for another season.

On early 2026 announced that Maýa Musaskaýa left MFA Žalgiris-MRU.

== International career ==
In 2018, Musaskaýa was included in the inaugural campaign of the Turkmenistan women's national futsal team in the AFC Women's Futsal Championship.

In February 2019, Musaskaýa was called up to the Turkmen national football team for their first-ever international match against Kazakhstan and was included in the final squad for the 2019 Turkish Women's Cup. She made her official debut against Romania, where she started in the country biggest lost to date. Musaskaýa was called up to represent Turkmenistan at the 2022 CAFA Women's Championship.

== Career statistics ==
=== Club ===
Club	Season	League			Cup		Total	
Club	Season	Division	Apps	Goals	Apps	Goals	Apps	Goals
Dudullu Spor	2022–23	Süper Ligi	12	1	—		12	1
Dudullu Spor	Total		12	1	—		12	1
MFA Žalgiris	2023	A Lyga	22	6	—		22	6
MFA Žalgiris	2024	A Lyga	16	1	6	0	22	1
MFA Žalgiris	2025	A Lyga	17	0			17	0
MFA Žalgiris	Total		55	7	6	0	61	7
Total career			67	8	6	0	73	8

=== International ===
As of match played 13 July 2023

Appearances and goals by national team and year
National team	Year	Apps	Goals
Turkmenistan	2019	5	0
Turkmenistan	2022	4	0
Total		9	0

== See also ==
- Turkmenistan women's national football team
