= CAFA Women's Futsal Championship =

- Organiser(s): CAFA
- Founded: 2022; 4 years ago
- Region: Central Asia
- Teams: 6 (Maximum)
- Current champions: Iran (4th title)
- Most championships: Iran (4 titles)
- Website: Official website
- 2025 CAFA Women's Futsal Championship

The CAFA Women's Futsal Championship is an international futsal competition in Central Asia for the member nations of the Central Asian Football Association (CAFA).

== Seniors ==
=== Results ===
Edition	Year	Hosts	Champions	Score	Runners-up	Third place	Score and Venue	Fourth place	No. of Teams
1	2022; Details	(Tajikistan) Dushanbe	Iran	round-robin	Uzbekistan	Kyrgyz Republic	round-robin	Tajikistan	4
2	2023; Details	(Uzbekistan) Tashkent	Iran	round-robin	Uzbekistan	Tajikistan	round-robin	Kyrgyz Republic	4
3	2024; Details	(Tajikistan) Dushanbe	Iran	round-robin	Uzbekistan	Kyrgyz Republic	round-robin	Turkmenistan	5
4	2025; Details	(Tajikistan) Dushanbe	Iran	round-robin	Uzbekistan	Kyrgyz Republic	round-robin	Turkmenistan	5
5	2026; Details	(Tajikistan) Dushanbe	Iran	round-robin	Kyrgyz Republic	Tajikistan	—N/a		3

=== Performance by nations ===
Team	Winners	Runners-up	Third-place	Fourth-place	Total
Iran	3 (2022, 2023, 2024)	–	–	–	3
Uzbekistan	–	3 (2022, 2023*, 2024)	–	–	3
Kyrgyz Republic	–	–	2 (2022, 2024)	1 (2023)	3
Tajikistan	–	–	1 (2023)	1 (2022*)	2
Turkmenistan	–	–	–	1 (2024)	1

* = hosts

=== Comprehensive team results by tournament ===
Legend

- 1st – Champions
- 2nd – Runners-up
- 3rd – Third place
- 4th – Fourth place
- Q – Qualified for upcoming tournament
- × – Did not enter
- •• – Withdrew

For each tournament, the number of teams (in brackets) are shown.

Team	2022 (Tajikistan) (4)	2023 (Uzbekistan) (4)	2024 (Tajikistan) (5)	2025 (Tajikistan) (5)	2026 (Tajikistan) (3)	Years
Afghanistan	×	×	×	×	×	0
Iran	1st	1st	1st	1st	1st	5
Kyrgyz Republic	3rd	4th	3rd	3rd	2nd	5
Tajikistan	4th	3rd	5th	5th	3rd	5
Turkmenistan	×	×	4th	4th	••	2
Uzbekistan	2nd	2nd	2nd	2nd	×	4

=== Overall team records ===
Teams are ranked by total points, then by goal difference, then by goals scored.

As of 2026 CAFA Women's Futsal Championship

Rank	Team	Part	Pld	W	D	L	GF	GA	GD	Pts
1	Iran	5	19	18	1	0	150	12	+138	55
2	Uzbekistan	4	17	11	2	4	93	41	+52	35
3	Kyrgyz Republic	5	19	4	4	11	26	96	–70	16
4	Turkmenistan	2	8	2	1	5	13	29	–16	7
5	Tajikistan	5	19	1	2	16	15	119	–104	5
6	Afghanistan	0	0	0	0	0	0	0	0	0

== Under-age tournaments ==
=== U-19 Women's futsal ===
Years	Hosts					Number of teams
Years	Hosts	Winners	Runners-up	Third place	Fourth place	Number of teams
2020; Details	(Tajikistan) Dushanbe	Iran	Uzbekistan	Turkmenistan	Kyrgyz Republic	6
