= Winter Sports Complex Ashgabat =

Multi-use indoor arena in Ashgabat, Turkmenistan

Coordinates: 37°54′58″N 58°22′37″E

Winter Sports Complex
- Interactive map of Winter Sports Complex
- Location: Ashgabat
- Capacity: 10,300

Construction
- Groundbreaking: 2009
- Opened: 2011
- Cost: €134.4 million
- Architect: Polimeks

Tenant
- Turkmenistan national ice hockey team

Winter Sports Complex (Turkmen: Gyşgy görnüşleri boýunça sport toplumy) is a multi-use indoor arena in Ashgabat, Turkmenistan. It is one of the largest ice hockey arenas in the CIS.

== Overview ==
Construction of a new Ice Palace began in 2009. Turkmenistan President Gurbanguly Berdimuhamedov signed a contract worth 134.4 million euros with the Turkish company "Polimeks".

The arena is located at the corner of Atatürk and Oguzhan street. Holds 10,000 spectators. In the center are gyms, recreational areas for athletes and spectators, cafés and other facilities. The total area of the new sports facility is 107,000 square meters. In the center of the palace housed the ice arena measuring 60 by 30 meters. Construction was completed in October 2011.

The official opening took place on 19 October and was dedicated to the 20th anniversary of Independence of Turkmenistan. The opening ceremony was attended by Russian hockey team "Sputnik" (Almetyevsk), "Bars" (Kazan), "Podhale" (Nowy Targ, Poland) and "Maribor" (Slovenia): they took part in an international tournament dedicated to the Turkmenistan Independence Day.

== Key features ==
- Date of construction: 2009 – October 2011
- Area: 107 thousand square meters
- Capacity: 10,000
- Width and length: 60x30 meters
- Hostel for 300 people
