= Ugiloy Kuchkarova =

Uzbekistani footballer (born 1996)

Personal information
- Full name: Ugiloy Mahmidjon qizi Kuchkarova
- Date of birth: 7 December 1996 (age 29)
- Place of birth: Rishton, Uzbekistan
- Position: Defender

Team information
- Current team: Sevinch

Senior career*
| Years | Team | Apps | (Gls) |
- Sevinch

International career^{‡}
| 2017– | Uzbekistan | 3 | (1) |
- * Club domestic league appearances and goals ‡ National team caps and goals as of 9 April 2019

Ugiloy Kuchkarova (Uzbek: Oʻgʻiloy Qoʻchqorova; born 7 December 1996) is an Uzbekistani footballer who plays as a defender for Women's Championship club Sevinch and the Uzbekistan women's national team.

== International career ==
Kuchkarova capped for Uzbekistan at senior level during the 2018 AFC Women's Asian Cup qualification and the 2020 AFC Women's Olympic Qualifying Tournament.

=== International goals ===
Scores and results list Uzbekistan's goal tally first

| No. | Date | Venue | Opponent | Score | Result | Competition |
|---|---|---|---|---|---|---|
| 1. | 27 November 2018 | Milliy Stadium, Tashkent, Uzbekistan | Iran | 2–1 | 2–1 | 2018 CAFA Women's Championship |
| 2. | 3 April 2019 | Lokomotiv Stadium, Tashkent, Uzbekistan | Vietnam | 1–1 | 1–2 | 2020 AFC Women's Olympic Qualifying Tournament |
| 3. | 29 August 2019 | Yakkasary Stadium, Tashkent, Uzbekistan | India | 5–1 | 5–1 | Friendly |

== See also ==
- List of Uzbekistan women's international footballers
