= Uzbekistan women's national futsal team =

Uzbekistan
- Association: Uzbekistan Football Association (UFA)
- Confederation: AFC (Asia)
- FIFA code: UZB
- FIFA ranking: 25 (12 December 2025)
Home colours	Away colours

Biggest win
- Kyrgyzstan 0–11 Uzbekistan (Dushanbe, Tajikistan; 22 January 2022)

Biggest defeat
- Japan 8–0 Uzbekistan (Incheon, South Korea; 26 June 2013); Uzbekistan 1–9 Iran (Nilai, Malaysia; 22 September 2015)

Asian Championship
- Appearances: 3 (First in 2015)
- Best result: Quarterfinals (2018)

CAFA Championship
- Appearances: 3 (First in 2022)
- Best result: Runners-up (2022, 2023, 2024)

The Uzbekistan women's national futsal team represents Uzbekistan in international women's futsal competitions and is run by the Uzbekistan Football Association (UFA).

== Fixtures and results ==
Legend

Win Draw Lose Fixture

=== 2024 ===
July 12, 2024 CFA International Women's Futsal Tournament	Iran	5–7	Uzbekistan	Lanzhou, China
16:30		Report		Stadium: Lanzhou Olympic Sports Center

July 13, 2024 CFA International Women's Futsal Tournament	Uzbekistan	3–2	China	Lanzhou, China
16:30		Report		Stadium: Lanzhou Olympic Sports Center

July 15, 2024 CFA International Women's Futsal Tournament	Uzbekistan	5–5	Vietnam	Lanzhou, China
16:30		Report		Stadium: Lanzhou Olympic Sports Center

=== 2025 ===
13 January 2025 2025 AFC Women's Futsal Asian Cup qualification	Philippines	3–3	Uzbekistan	Tashkent, Uzbekistan
15:00	Flanigan 03:52; Guillou 14:23; Connolly 38:02	Report	Kudratova 07:07; Karachik 22:33, 37:57	Stadium: Yunusobod Sport Complex, Tashkent; Referee: Jo Hyun-jin (South Korea)

15 January 2025 2025 AFC Women's Futsal Asian Cup qualification	Uzbekistan	5–0	Kuwait	Tashkent, Uzbekistan
18:00	Turdiboeva 00:44; Nazarova 10:29; Shoyimova 18:32, 20:13, 26:11	Report		Stadium: Yunusobod Sport Complex, Tashkent; Referee: Majid Al-Hatmi (Oman)

17 January 2025 2025 AFC Women's Futsal Asian Cup qualification	Australia	3–1	Uzbekistan	Tashkent, Uzbekistan
18:00	Mclean 22:15 (pen.); Fazzari 27:17, 39:52	Report	Nazarova 04:52	Stadium: Yunusobod Sport Complex, Tashkent; Referee: Maryam Al-Hadhrami (Oman)

19 January 2025 2025 AFC Women's Futsal Asian Cup qualification	Uzbekistan	6–2	Turkmenistan	Tashkent, Uzbekistan
18:00	Shoyimova 01:17, 02:55, 09:44, 23:03, 33:01; Kudratova 38:40	Report	Kurbanowa 15:24; Mingazowa 23:52	Stadium: Yunusobod Sport Complex, Tashkent; Referee: Rawand Shwan (Iraq)

== Tournament record ==
=== FIFA Futsal Women's World Cup ===
FIFA Futsal Women's World Cup record
Year	Round	Position	GP	W	D	L	GS	GA
(Philippines) 2025	Did not qualify							
Total	–	0/1	0	0	0	0	0	0

=== AFC Women's Futsal Asian Cup ===
AFC Women's Futsal Asian Cup record
Year	Round	Position	GP	W	D	L	GS	GA
(Malaysia) 2015	Group stage	3/3	3	0	1	2	4	13
(Thailand) 2018	Quarterfinals	8/8	3	1	0	2	6	15
(China) 2025	Group stage	2/3	3	1	0	2	5	10
Total	–	2/3	9	2	1	6	15	38

=== Asian Indoor and Martial Arts Games ===
Asian Indoor and Martial Arts Games record
Year	Round	Position	GP	W	D	L	GS	GA
(Thailand) 2005	Final	Champions	4	4	0	0	19	9
(Macau) 2007	Final	Third place	4	2	1	1	14	8
(Vietnam) 2009	Group stage	3/3	2	0	0	2	4	11
(South Korea) 2013	Group stage	4/4	3	0	1	2	2	14
(Turkmenistan) 2017	Did not enter							
(Thailand) 2021	Cancelled							
Total	–	4/5	14	6	2	5	39	42

=== CAFA Women's Futsal Championship ===
CAFA Women's Futsal Championship record
Year	Round	Position	GP	W	D	L	GS	GA
(Tajikistan) 2022	Round robin	Runners-up	6	4	1	1	38	8
(Uzbekistan) 2023	Round robin	Runners-up	3	2	0	1	17	7
(Tajikistan) 2024	Round robin	Runners-up	4	3	0	1	20	9
Total	–	0/3	13	9	1	3	75	24

=== Other tournaments ===
CFA international women's futsal tournament

- 2024 Lanzhou – (gold) 1st place

== See also ==
- Uzbekistan national football team
- Uzbekistan women's national futsal team
- Uzbekistan national under-17 football team
- Uzbekistan national under-19 football team
- Uzbekistan national under-23 football team
- Sport in Uzbekistan
