= Zumratjon Nazarova =

Uzbekistani football and futsal player

Personal information
- Full name: Zumratjon Nazarova
- Date of birth: 27 May 1992 (age 34)
- Place of birth: Kosonsoy, Uzbekistan
- Position: Defender

Team information
- Current team: FC Bunyodkor

Senior career*
Years	Team	Apps	(Gls)
- FC Bunyodkor

International career
2015–2017	Uzbekistan	7	(1)
2018–	Uzbekistan (futsal)		
- * Club domestic league appearances and goals

Zumratjon Nazarova (born 27 May 1992) is an Uzbek professional footballer who plays as a defender for Women's Championship club FC Bunyodkor. She is also a futsal player, and represented Uzbekistan internationally in both football and futsal.

== International career ==
Nazarova has been capped for Uzbekistan at senior level in both football and futsal. In football, she represented Uzbekistan at the 2016 AFC Women's Olympic Qualifying Tournament and the 2018 AFC Women's Asian Cup qualification.

In futsal, Nazarova played for Uzbekistan at the 2018 AFC Women's Futsal Championship.

=== International goals ===
Scores and results list Uzbekistan's goal tally first

No.	Date	Venue	Opponent	Score	Result	Competition	Ref.
1	11 March 2015	Petra Stadium, Amman, Jordan	Palestine	2–0	6–0	2016 AFC Women's Olympic Qualifying Tournament	
