= Maftuna Shoyimova =

Uzbekistani footballer

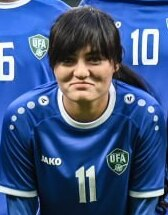

Personal information
- Full name: Maftuna Suyunboy qizi Shoyimova
- Date of birth: 1 January 1999 (age 27)
- Place of birth: Chirakchi, Uzbekistan
- Position: Midfielder

Team information
- Current team: Sevinch

Senior career*
Years	Team	Apps	(Gls)
- Sevinch

International career^{‡}
2014–2017	Uzbekistan U19	7+	(1)
2017–	Uzbekistan	7	(0)
- * Club domestic league appearances and goals ‡ National team caps and goals as of 9 April 2019

Maftuna Shoyimova (born 1 January 1999) is an Uzbekistani footballer who plays as a midfielder for Women's Championship club Sevinch and the Uzbekistan women's national team.

== International goals ==
No.	Date	Venue	Opponent	Score	Result	Competition
1.	23 November 2018	Milliy Stadium, Tashkent, Uzbekistan	Afghanistan	12–0	20–0	2018 CAFA Women's Championship
2.	29 August 2019	Yakkasary Stadium, Tashkent, Uzbekistan	India	2–1	5–1	Friendly
3.	5 April 2021	AGMK Stadium, Olmaliq, Uzbekistan	India	1–0	1–0	Friendly
4.	20 September 2021	Pakhtakor Stadium, Tashkent, Uzbekistan	Mongolia	11–0	12–0	2022 AFC Women's Asian Cup qualification
5.	20 July 2022	Pamir Stadium, Dushanbe, Tajikistan	Iran	1–0	1–0	2022 CAFA Women's Championship
6.	5 April 2023	Milliy Stadium, Tashkent, Uzbekistan	Bhutan	9–0	9–0	2024 AFC Women's Olympic Qualifying Tournament
7.	8 April 2023	Milliy Stadium, Tashkent, Uzbekistan	Timor-Leste	3–0	3–0	2024 AFC Women's Olympic Qualifying Tournament
8.	25 September 2023	Linping Sports Center Stadium, Hangzhou, China	Mongolia	3–0	6–0	2022 Asian Games
9.	24 June 2025	Do'stlik Stadion, Tashkent, Uzbekistan	Palestine	1–0	4–0	Friendly
10.	29 June 2025	Milliy Stadium, Tashkent, Uzbekistan	Sri Lanka	7–0	10–0	2026 AFC Women's Asian Cup qualification
11.	2 July 2025	Milliy Stadium, Tashkent, Uzbekistan	Laos	4–0	7–0	2026 AFC Women's Asian Cup qualification
12.	2 July 2025	Milliy Stadium, Tashkent, Uzbekistan	Laos	6–0	7–0	2026 AFC Women's Asian Cup qualification
13.	5 July 2025	Milliy Stadium, Tashkent, Uzbekistan	Nepal	3–1	3–3 (4–2 p)	2026 AFC Women's Asian Cup qualification
14.	21 September 2026	Wave Stadium Kariya, Kariya, Japan	Hong Kong	2–1	2–1	2026 Asian Games

== See also ==
- List of Uzbekistan women's international footballers
