= Elham Anafjeh =

Iranian footballer (born 1998)

Personal information
- Date of birth: 14 February 1998 (age 28)
- Place of birth: Shushtar, Iran
- Position: Defender

Senior career*
Years	Team	Apps	(Gls)
- Naft Abadan (futsal)

International career^{‡}
2016–2017	Iran U19	3	(0)
2017	Iran	3	(0)
- * Club domestic league appearances and goals ‡ National team caps and goals as of 14 September 2017.

Elham Anafjeh (Persian: الهام عنافچه; born 14 February 1998) is an Iranian footballer who played as a defender. She has been a member of the Iran women's national team. She is also a futsal player.

== Early life ==
Anafjeh was born in Shushtar.

== International career ==
Anafjeh capped for Iran at senior level during the 2018 AFC Women's Asian Cup qualification.
