= Fereshteh Karimi =

Iranian futsal player

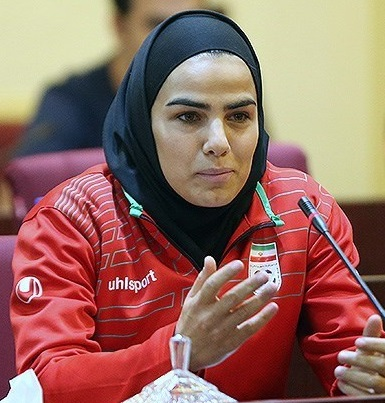

Personal information
- Full name: Fereshteh Karimi
- Date of birth: February 16, 1989 (age 37)
- Place of birth: Tehran, Iran

Team information
- Current team: Daneshgah Azad

Senior career*
Years	Team	Apps	(Gls)
- Daneshgah Azad
2015–	Kuwait Futsal		

International career
- Iran
- Iran (futsal)
- * Club domestic league appearances and goals

Fereshteh Karimi (Persian: فرشته کریمی) is an Iranian footballer and women's futsal player currently playing for Azad University in Iran. She was chosen as one of the top 10 nominees for the best woman player in the world in 2013 by the futsalplanet website.

In September 2015 she won the first AFC Women's Futsal Championship playing for Iran, and was chosen as the Most Valuable Player of the tournament.

She is also participating at the second 2018 AFC Women's Futsal Championship in Thailand.

== International goals ==
No.	Date	Venue	Opponent	Score	Result	Competition
1.	6 July 2009	Rajamangala Stadium, Bangkok, Thailand	Uzbekistan	1–1	1–4	2010 AFC Women's Asian Cup qualification
2.	8 July 2009	Rajamangala Stadium, Bangkok, Thailand	Thailand	1–4	1–8	2010 AFC Women's Asian Cup qualification
3.	8 March 2011	Prince Mohammed Stadium, Zarqa, Jordan	Palestine	3–0	4–0	2012 Summer Olympics qualification
4.	4 October 2011	Zayed Bin Sultan Stadium, Abu Dhabi, UAE	Lebanon	1–0	8–1	2011 WAFF Women's Championship
5.	4 October 2011	Zayed Bin Sultan Stadium, Abu Dhabi, UAE	Lebanon	4–1	8–1	2011 WAFF Women's Championship
6.	22 March 2015	Taipei Municipal Stadium, Taipei, Taiwan	Laos	2–1	5–1	2016 AFC Women's Olympic Qualifying Tournament
