= Feruza Turdiboeva =

Uzbekistani footballer

Personal information
- Full name: Feruza Abdukhamid qizi Turdiboeva
- Date of birth: 6 January 1994 (age 32)
- Place of birth: Parkent, Uzbekistan
- Position: Forward

International career^{‡}
Years	Team	Apps	(Gls)
2010	Uzbekistan U19	2+	(2)
2011–2017	Uzbekistan	10+	(7)
2015	Uzbekistan (futsal)	1+	(1)
- ‡ National team caps and goals as of 11 April 2017

Feruza Turdiboeva (born 6 January 1994) is an Uzbekistani footballer who plays as a forward. She has been a member of the Uzbekistan women's national team.

== International goals ==
No.	Date	Venue	Opponent	Score	Result	Competition
1.	20 March 2011	Bangabandhu National Stadium, Dhaka, Bangladesh	India	4–1	5–1	2012 Summer Olympics qualification
2.	5 June 2011	King Abdullah Stadium, Amman, Jordan	Jordan	1–0	3–0	2012 Summer Olympics qualification
3.	5 June 2013	Amman International Stadium, Amman, Jordan	Kuwait	2–0	18–0	2014 AFC Women's Asian Cup qualification
4.	5 June 2013	Amman International Stadium, Amman, Jordan	Kuwait	10–0	18–0	2014 AFC Women's Asian Cup qualification
5.	7 June 2013	Amman International Stadium, Amman, Jordan	Lebanon	1–0	4–0	2014 AFC Women's Asian Cup qualification
6.	11 March 2015	Petra Stadium, Amman, Jordan	Palestine	4–0	6–0	2016 AFC Women's Olympic Qualifying Tournament
7.	7 April 2017	Kim Il-sung Stadium, Pyongyang, North Korea	India	7–1	7–1	2018 AFC Women's Asian Cup qualification
8.	23 November 2018	Milliy Stadium, Tashkent, Uzbekistan	Afghanistan	6–0	20–0	2018 CAFA Women's Championship
9.	25 November 2018	Milliy Stadium, Tashkent, Uzbekistan	Tajikistan	5–0	11–0	2018 CAFA Women's Championship
10.	27 November 2018	Milliy Stadium, Tashkent, Uzbekistan	Iran	1–1	2–1	2018 CAFA Women's Championship
11.	29 November 2018	Milliy Stadium, Tashkent, Uzbekistan	Kyrgyzstan	1–0	10–0	2018 CAFA Women's Championship
12.	3 March 2019	Hane, Side, Turkey	Turkmenistan	2–0	11–1	2019 Turkish Women's Cup
13.	8 April 2025	Yongchuan Sports Center, Chongqing, China	Zambia	1–3	3–4	2025 Yongchuan International Tournament

== See also ==
- List of Uzbekistan women's international footballers
