= Sara Shirbeigi =

Iranian futsal player

Sara Shirbeigi (Persian: سارا شیربیگی) is an Iranian futsal player.

== Career ==
Shirbeigi has been described as "the top ten [female] futsal players in the world".

== Style of play ==
Shirbeigi is known for her shooting ability.

== Personal life ==
Shirbeigi has enjoyed playing rugby.

On 4 January 2026, she publicly supported the 2025–2026 Iranian protests, posting a picture of Milad Tower and stating: "May this suffering that is not ours pass one day."
