= Kuwait women's national futsal team =

Kuwait
- Nickname(s): الأزرق النسائي (The Women's blue)
- Association: Kuwait Football Association (الإتحاد الكويتي لكرة القدم)
- Confederation: AFC (Asia)
- Head coach: (Iran) Shahrzad Mozafar
- Captain: Fajir Ahmed
- FIFA code: KUW
- FIFA ranking: 78 (8 May 2026)
Home colours	Away colours

First international
- Jordan 18–0 Kuwait (Jordan, 28 July 2008)

Biggest win
- Oman 1–6 Kuwait (Jeddah, Saudi Arabia, 18 June 2022)

Biggest defeat
- Jordan 18–0 Kuwait (Jordan, 28 July 2008)

AFC Women's Futsal Asian Cup
- Appearances: 0

Asian Indoor and Martial Arts Games
- Appearances: 0

The Kuwait women's national futsal team represents Kuwait in international women's futsal competitions and is controlled by the Kuwait Football Association.

== History ==
=== Debut ===
the new established Kuwaiti women's futsal team for a starter they debuted at the 2008 WAFF Women's Futsal Championship hosted in Jordan, the tournament saw Kuwait plays its first official match against Jordan in which they were beaten with a score of 18 to nil, making it the Biggest defeat Kuwait has earned in its history, coming back for their second match against Palestine, they were trashed by the Palestinians as the matches end 11 to nil. such poor results led to the long inactivity Kuwait team suffered from.

=== New Era ===
A new era of women's futsal finally arrived in Kuwait. After decades of neglect, Fatema Hayat was appointed in May 2018 as the first female board member of the Kuwait Football Association (KFA). Under Fatema's leadership, the Women's Football Committee (WFC) set to work making significant strides in rapidly growing women's futsal in Kuwait. After visiting and meeting with counterparts in Jordan and Bahrain to learn from their experience, the committee also met with several FIFA representatives to strategize on the best way to move forward. With FIFA's support and funds in hand, the WFC hit the ground running and hired renowned head coach Shahrzad Mozafar to lead Kuwait women's national futsal team. Mozafar has extensive experience as a futsal coach and under her leadership, Iran won AFC Women's Futsal Championship twice, in 2015 and 2018. To ensure a thriving program, the first-ever Women's Futsal National League commenced in January 2019 and will conclude in May 2019. The league played an important role in helping Coach Mozafar pick players for the Kuwait Women's National Futsal Team. After watching them play for their respective clubs, Coach Mozafar chose 17 players to represent Kuwait in women's futsal. The WFC wasted no time in scheduling friendly matches against Turkmenistan and Bahrain. These friendly matches helped players gain experience in competing in international matches and prepared them for the GCC Futsal Cup in November 2019, to be hosted by Kuwait, with the aim of participating in the 2020 Asian Cup. In 2020, The Kuwait Football Association (KFA) Women's Committee created history when the Kuwait National Women's Futsal League final between Kuwait Sports Club and Al Arabi Sports Club was broadcast live on national television for the first time ever in February, which marked a historical path towards improving women games in the middle east. under the Iranian coach's guidance, Kuwait earned its ever first silver medal in 2022 GCC Games.
Kuwait returned to the WAFF Women's Futsal Championship in its 3rd edition hosted in Saudi Arabia. They started with style, earning the first three points after beating the Host, 3–1. their second match against debutant Oman saw Kuwait getting their biggest win by a margin of five goals. Despite going to the semifinals undefeated, Kuwait was largely shockedby Iraq in a twelve-nil score blow. It led to big criticism of the technical team.

== Results and fixtures ==
Legend

Win Draw Lose Fixture

=== 2008 ===
28 July 2008 2008 WAFF Women's Futsal Championship Group B	Jordan	18–0	Kuwait	Jordan
18:00 UTC+3

30 July 2008 2008 WAFF Women's Futsal Championship Group B	Palestine	11–0	Kuwait	Jordan
20:00 UTC+3

=== 2019 ===
31 March 2019 Friendly	Kuwait	0–6	Turkmenistan	Kuwait City, Kuwait
--:-- UTC+3

3 April 2019 Friendly	Kuwait	1–5	Turkmenistan	Kuwait City, Kuwait
--:-- UTC+3

6 April 2019 Friendly	Kuwait	1–4	Bahrain	Kuwait City, Kuwait
--:-- UTC+3

7 September 2019 CFA 2019 Belt and Road Cup	Thailand	10–1	Kuwait	Chengdu, China
--:-- UTC+8				Stadium: Qingbaijiang Cultural and Sports Center

8 September 2019 CFA 2019 Belt and Road Cup	China	12–0	Kuwait	Chengdu, China
--:-- UTC+8				Stadium: Qingbaijiang Cultural and Sports Center

10 September 2019 CFA 2019 Belt and Road Cup	New Zealand	4–0	Kuwait	Chengdu, China
--:-- UTC+8				Stadium: Qingbaijiang Cultural and Sports Center

26 September 2019 Friendly	Kuwait	0–6	Lebanon	Kuwait City, Kuwait
18:30 UTC+3

29 September 2019 Friendly	Kuwait	1–3	Lebanon	Kuwait City, Kuwait
18:30 UTC+3

16 October 2019 Friendly	Kuwait	4–0	Afghanistan	Kuwait City, Kuwait
--:-- UTC+3

16 October 2019 Friendly	Kuwait	3–3	Afghanistan	Kuwait City, Kuwait
--:-- UTC+3

27 October 2019 2019 GCC Women's Games	Kuwait	1–1	United Arab Emirates	Qurain City, Kuwait
--:-- UTC+3

28 October 2019 2019 GCC Women's Games	Kuwait	3–4	Saudi Arabia	Qurain City, Kuwait
--:-- UTC+3

30 October 2019 2019 GCC Women's Games	Kuwait	0–4	Bahrain	Qurain City, Kuwait
--:-- UTC+3

=== 2022 ===
5 May 2022 Friendly	Kyrgyzstan	1–1	Kuwait	Bishkek, Kyrgyzstan
--:-- UTC+6

7 May 2022 Friendly	Kyrgyzstan	1–3	Kuwait	Bishkek, Kyrgyzstan
18:00 UTC+6

16 May 2022 2022 GCC Games	United Arab Emirates	1–1	Kuwait	Sabah Al-Salem, Kuwait
19:00 UTC+3	Rashid 6'	Report	Abdulraheim 17'	Stadium: Sheikh Saad Al Abdullah Sports Complex; Referee: Saad Al Haiean (Saudi Arabia)

18 May 2022 2022 GCC Games	Kuwait	1–2	Saudi Arabia	Sabah Al-Salem, Kuwait
19:00 UTC+3	Abdulraheim 20'	Report	Mobarak 8'; R. Abdullah 18'	Stadium: Sheikh Saad Al Abdullah Sports Complex; Referee: Faisal Abdullah (Qatar)

19 May 2022 2022 GCC Games	Kuwait	1–2	Bahrain	Sabah Al-Salem, Kuwait
19:30 UTC+3	AlSaqabi 19'	Report	Sowar 23'; AlKhattal 29'	Stadium: Sheikh Saad Al Abdullah Sports Complex; Referee: Faisal Abdullah (Qatar)

21 May 2022 2022 GCC Games Semi-finals	Kuwait	2–2 (a.e.t.) (3–1 p)	Saudi Arabia	Sabah Al-Salem, Kuwait
19:30 UTC+3	Mukhayzin 15' (o.g.); Mohammad 47' (pen.)	Report	R. Abdullah 14', 45' (pen.)	Stadium: Sheikh Saad Al Abdullah Sports Complex; Referee: Faisal Abdullah (Qatar)
	Penalties
	Ahmad (penalty scored); AlMulla (penalty scored); AlRefaie (penalty scored)		R. Abdullah (penalty missed); Mohammed (penalty missed); Mukhayzin (penalty scored); Ibrahim (penalty missed)

24 May 2022 2022 GCC Games Final	Kuwait	1–2	Bahrain	Sabah Al-Salem, Kuwait
18:00 UTC+3	Mohammad 39'	Report	Alkhalifa 5'; AlIsa 11'	Stadium: Sheikh Saad Al Abdullah Sports Complex; Referee: Faisal Abdullah (Qatar)

16 June 2022 2022 WAFF Women's Futsal Championship Group B	Kuwait	3–1	Saudi Arabia	Jeddah, Saudi Arabia
20:30 UTC+3	AlMulla 4', 24'; Nour 20'	Report	Reda 37'	Stadium: King Abdullah Sports City

18 June 2022 2022 WAFF Women's Futsal Championship Group B	Oman	1–6	Kuwait	Jeddah, Saudi Arabia
20:30 UTC+3	Al Musallami 10'	Report	Basha 7', 15', 17'; AlRefaie 23', 32'; AlSaqabi 30'	Stadium: King Abdullah Sports City

22 June 2022 2022 WAFF Women's Futsal Championship Semi-final	Kuwait	0–12	Iraq	Jeddah, Saudi Arabia
20:30 UTC+3		Report	Al-Quraishi 16'; Salih 18', 22'; Mulla Bakr 21'; Salihi 21', 22', 26', 27'; Al-Lami 28', 29'; Al-Ghazawi 30', 32'	Stadium: King Abdullah Sports City

24 June 2022 2022 WAFF Women's Futsal Championship 3rd place	Bahrain	2–0	Kuwait	Jeddah, Saudi Arabia
18:15 UTC+3	AlKhalifa 26'; Ebrahim 30'	Report		Stadium: King Abdullah Sports City

=== 2025 ===
11 January 2025 2025 AFC Women's Futsal Asian Cup qualification	Kuwait	1–4	Philippines	Tashkent, Uzbekistan
18:00 UTC+5	Sh. Mohammad 36'	Report	Guillou 4', 39'; Flanigan 22'; Tolentin 27'	Stadium: Yunusobod Sport Complex; Referee: Najat Al-Blooshi (United Arab Emirates)

13 January 2025 2025 AFC Women's Futsal Asian Cup qualification	Kuwait	0–5	Australia	Tashkent, Uzbekistan
18:00		Report	Pipino 06:55; Camilleri 15:59; Fazzari 23:23; Tabain 31:30; Mclean 39:37 (2pen.)	Stadium: Yunusobod Sport Complex, Tashkent; Referee: Rawand Shwan (Iraq)

15 January 2025 2025 AFC Women's Futsal Asian Cup qualification	Uzbekistan	5–0	Kuwait	Tashkent, Uzbekistan
18:00	Turdiboeva 00:44; Nazarova 10:29; Shoyimova 18:32, 20:13, 26:11	Report		Stadium: Yunusobod Sport Complex, Tashkent; Referee: Majid Al-Hatmi (Oman)

17 January 2025 2025 AFC Women's Futsal Asian Cup qualification	Turkmenistan	4–3	Kuwait	Tashkent, Uzbekistan
15:00	Kurbanowa 10:13, 28:48; Çaryýewa 20:26; Mämmetsähedowa 27:22	Report	Al-Herz 19:55 (2pen.); Al-Refaie 25:35; Basha 39:34	Stadium: Yunusobod Sport Complex, Tashkent; Referee: Najat Al-Blooshi (United Arab Emirates)

== Coaching staff ==
=== Current coaching staff ===
Role	Name
Head coach	(Iran) Shahrzad Mozafar

=== Current squad ===
The following players were called up for the 2022 WAFF Women's Futsal Championship from 16 to 22 June 2022.

No.	Pos.	Player	Date of birth (age)	Caps	Club
1	GK	Razan AlEnzi			(Kuwait) Al-Arabi SC
13	GK	Yasmeen Abdullah			(Kuwait) Al-Fatat SC
2	FP	Loura ALThuwaini			(Kuwait) Al-Arabi SC
3	FP	Deena Ali			(Kuwait) Al-Fatat SC
4	FP	Noor Alherz			(Kuwait) Al-Fatat SC
5	FP	Shaikhah ALRaban			(Kuwait) Al-Fatat SC
6	FP	Maryam Nour			(Kuwait) Al-Arabi SC
7	FP	Nehal ALSaqabi			Kuwait SC
8	FP	Abeer AlRefaie			Kuwait SC
9	FP	Zainah Salamah			(Kuwait) Al-Arabi SC
10	FP	Reem AlMulla			Kuwait SC
12	FP	Shrouq Basha			(Kuwait) Al-Arabi SC
14	FP	Fajir Ahmed (captain)			Kuwait SC

== Competitive record ==
=== FIFA Futsal Women's World Cup ===
FIFA Futsal Women's World Cup record
Year	Round	Position	GP	W	D	L	GS	GA
(Philippines) 2025	Did not qualify							
Total	–	0/1	0	0	0	0	0	0

=== AFC Women's Futsal Asian Cup ===
AFC Women's Futsal Asian Cup record
Hosts / Year	Result	GP	W	D*	L	GS	GA	GD
(Malaysia) 2015	Did not enter							
(Thailand) 2018	Did not enter							
(Kuwait) 2020	Cancelled							
(China) 2025	Did not qualify							
Total	0/3	—	—	—	—	—	—	—

*Draws include knockout matches decided on penalty kicks.

=== Futsal at the Asian Indoor and Martial Arts Games ===
Futsal at the Asian Indoor and Martial Arts Games record
Hosts / Year	Result	GP	W	D*	L	GS	GA	GD
(Thailand) 2005	Did not enter							
(Macau) 2007	Did not enter							
(Vietnam) 2009	Did not enter							
(South Korea) 2013	Did not enter							
(Turkmenistan) 2017	Did not enter							
Total	0/5	—	—	—	—	—	—	—

*Draws include knockout matches decided on penalty kicks.

=== WAFF Women's Futsal Championship ===
WAFF Women's Futsal Championship record
Hosts / Year	Result	GP	W	D*	L	GS	GA	GD
(Jordan) 2008	Group stage	2	0	0	2	0	29	-29
(Bahrain) 2012	Did not enter							
(Saudi Arabia) 2022	Fourth place	4	2	0	2	9	16	-7
Total	2/3	6	2	0	4	9	45	-36

*Draws include knockout matches decided on penalty kicks.
