= 2025 AFC Women's Futsal Asian Cup qualification =

Tournament details
- Dates: 11 – 19 January
- Teams: 19 (from 1 confederation)

Tournament statistics
- Matches played: 32
- Goals scored: 212 (6.63 per match)
- Top scorer: (Uzbekistan) Maftuna Shoyimova (8 goals)
- All statistics correct as of 19 January 2025.

A qualification tournament was held to determine nine of twelve participating teams for the 2025 AFC Women's Futsal Asian Cup in China. This marks a first time that a dedicated tournament will be held for an AFC Women's Futsal Asian Cup.

== Teams ==
A total of 47 AFC member associations were eligible to enter the qualification process. the Northern Mariana Islands, whose association is not a FIFA member, were not be eligible to qualify for the 2025 FIFA Futsal Women's World Cup. Nineteen teams (out of 47), including nine entrants who did not participate in the previous edition, have entered the competition. 25 teams, including Bangladesh and Malaysia who did participate in the previous edition, did not enter the qualification and were listed below. The following teams with asterisks are the teams that never had a women's futsal side.

- Afghanistan
- Bangladesh
- Bhutan*
- Brunei*
- Cambodia*
- DPR Korea*
- Timor-Leste*
- Guam
- Jordan
- Korea Republic*
- Laos
- Malaysia
- Maldives*
- Mongolia*
- Nepal*
- Northern Mariana Islands*
- Oman
- Qatar
- Saudi Arabia
- Singapore*
- Sri Lanka*
- Syria
- Tajikistan
- United Arab Emirates
- Yemen*

=== Draw ===
The draw was held on 17 October 2024 at the AFC House in Kuala Lumpur, Malaysia.

=== Seeding ===
Teams who participated in the final tournament of the previous edition were ranked from the 1st to the 13th by their performance at that tournament. Other teams who did not participate in the previous edition, were unranked.

Final rankings

| Pos | Team | Pld | W | D | L | GF | GA | GD | Pts | Final result |
|---|---|---|---|---|---|---|---|---|---|---|
| 1 | Iran | 5 | 5 | 0 | 0 | 37 | 6 | +31 | 15 | Champions and runners-up (Already qualified for 2025 AFC Women's Futsal Asian Cup) |
| 2 | Japan | 6 | 5 | 0 | 1 | 33 | 12 | +21 | 15 | Champions and runners-up (Already qualified for 2025 AFC Women's Futsal Asian Cup) |
| 3 | Thailand | 6 | 3 | 2 | 1 | 31 | 4 | +27 | 11 | Third place |
| 4 | Vietnam | 6 | 4 | 1 | 1 | 13 | 7 | +6 | 13 | Fourth place |
| 5 | Indonesia | 4 | 2 | 1 | 1 | 13 | 3 | +10 | 7 | Eliminated in quarter-finals |
| 6 | China | 4 | 2 | 0 | 2 | 17 | 12 | +5 | 6 | Qualified as hosts |
| 7 | Uzbekistan | 3 | 1 | 0 | 2 | 6 | 15 | −9 | 3 | Eliminated in quarter-finals |
| 8 | Chinese Taipei | 4 | 2 | 0 | 2 | 11 | 10 | +1 | 6 | Eliminated in quarter-finals |
| 9 | Malaysia | 3 | 1 | 0 | 2 | 10 | 8 | +2 | 3 | Eliminated in group stage |
| 10 | Hong Kong | 3 | 1 | 0 | 2 | 7 | 10 | −3 | 3 | Eliminated in group stage |
| 11 | Lebanon | 3 | 1 | 0 | 2 | 4 | 13 | −9 | 3 | Eliminated in group stage |
| 12 | Turkmenistan | 2 | 0 | 0 | 2 | 1 | 17 | −16 | 0 | Eliminated in group stage |
| 13 | Bahrain | 3 | 0 | 0 | 3 | 4 | 21 | −17 | 0 | Eliminated in group stage |
| 14 | Bangladesh | 3 | 0 | 0 | 3 | 2 | 20 | −18 | 0 | Eliminated in group stage |
| 15 | Macau | 3 | 0 | 0 | 3 | 0 | 31 | −31 | 0 | Eliminated in group stage |

Source: AFC

=== Pots ===
Participating teams are seeded into four pots based on the final ranking of the previous edition of the competition. Teams that did not participate in the previous edition and have not been ranked will be allocated to Pot 4. At the beginning of the draw, the host associations were separately placed into an additional host pot to ensure they are drawn into different groups. The host associations will be assigned to each group in accordance with their seeding, following the pot allocation principles.

| | Pot 1 | Pot 2 | Pot 3 | Pot 4 |
|---|---|---|---|---|
| Host teams | 3. **Thailand** (**H**); 5. **Indonesia** (**H**); 7. **Uzbekistan** (**H**) | | | 21. Myanmar (**H**) |
| Remaining teams | 4. **Vietnam** | 8. **Chinese Taipei**; 10. **Hong Kong**; 11. Lebanon; 12. Turkmenistan | 13. **Bahrain**; 15. Macau | 16. **Australia**; 17. India; 18. Iraq; 19. Kuwait; 20. Kyrgyzstan; 22. Pakistan **(W)**; 23. Palestine; 24. **Philippines** |

Notes

- Teams in **bold** qualified for the final tournament.
- (H): Qualification group hosts.
- (W): Withdrew after the draw.

== Groups ==
=== Tiebreakers ===
Teams are ranked according to points (3 points for a win, 1 point for a draw, 0 points for a loss), and if tied on points, the following tiebreaking criteria are applied, in the order given, to determine the rankings:

1. Points in head-to-head matches among tied teams;
2. Goal difference in head-to-head matches among tied teams;
3. Goals scored in head-to-head matches among tied teams;
4. If more than two teams were tied, and after applying all head-to-head criteria above, a subset of teams are still tied, all head-to-head criteria above are reapplied exclusively to this subset of teams;
5. Goal difference in all group matches;
6. Goals scored in all group matches;
7. Penalty shoot-out if only two teams are tied and they are playing each other in the last round of the group;
8. Disciplinary points (yellow card = −1 point, red card as a result of two yellow cards = −3 points, direct red card = −3 points, yellow card followed by direct red card = −4 points);
9. Drawing of lots.

=== Group A ===
| Pos | Team | Pld | W | D | L | GF | GA | GD | Pts | Qualification |
|---|---|---|---|---|---|---|---|---|---|---|
| 1 | Thailand (H) | 4 | 4 | 0 | 0 | 22 | 3 | +19 | 12 | Final tournament |
| 2 | Bahrain | 4 | 2 | 1 | 1 | 14 | 10 | +4 | 7 | Final tournament |
| 3 | Palestine | 4 | 1 | 1 | 2 | 6 | 12 | −6 | 4 | |
| 4 | Iraq | 4 | 1 | 1 | 2 | 9 | 18 | −9 | 4 | |
| 5 | Lebanon | 4 | 0 | 1 | 3 | 2 | 10 | −8 | 1 | |

Source: AFC
Rules for classification: Qualification tiebreakers
(H) Hosts
11 January 2025
16:30

| Bahrain | 1–1 | Lebanon |
|---|---|---|
| Al Khalifa 26:41 | Report | Wakim 12:38 |

Nonthaburi Stadium, Nonthaburi
Referee: Ali Ahmadi (Iran)
11 January 2025
19:30

| Iraq | 1–1 | Palestine |
|---|---|---|
| Ghattas 24:58 (o.g.) | Report | Youssef 24:34 |

Nonthaburi Stadium, Nonthaburi
Referee: Yamamoto Mari (Japan)

13 January 2025
16:30

| Iraq | 5–9 | Bahrain |
|---|---|---|
| Al-Ghazawi 11:39; Al-Balahi 25:48; Shareef 26:23; Lami 33:33; Sabkar 39:39 (o.g.) | Report | Al Khalifa 02:07, 27:45; Sowar 02:57, 14:49, 23:11; Yaqoob 03:41, 14:18; Sabkar 13:43; Al-Isa 39:59 |

Nonthaburi Stadium, Nonthaburi
Referee: Nikita Afingenov (Uzbekistan)
13 January 2025
19:30

| Palestine | 1–8 | Thailand |
|---|---|---|
| Shattara 26:47 | Report | Abu Asfar 07:34 (o.g.); Jenjira 10:38; Arriya 16:40, 25:27; Darika 18:58, 26:36; Sangrawee 31:21; Paerploy 39:39 |

Nonthaburi Stadium, Nonthaburi
Referee: Muhamad Faiz Bin Jamaluddin (Malaysia)

15 January 2025
16:30

| Lebanon | 0–3 | Palestine |
|---|---|---|
| | Report | Sarawi 02:14; Youssef 24:24, 38:35 |

Nonthaburi Stadium, Nonthaburi
Referee: Nurul Atikah Janah (Malaysia)
15 January 2025
19:30

| Thailand | 7–1 | Iraq |
|---|---|---|
| Mohammed 06:14 (o.g.); Darika 11:37; Arriya 15:40; Paerploy 29:36; Jenjira 32:03, 34:38; Lalida 38:26 | Report | Shareef 09:13 |

Nonthaburi Stadium, Nonthaburi
Referee: Yamamoto Mari (Japan)

17 January 2025
16:30

| Lebanon | 1–2 | Iraq |
|---|---|---|
| Wakim 39:59 | Report | Al-Ghazawi 20:48, 37:05 |

Nonthaburi Stadium, Nonthaburi
Referee: Ali Ahmadi (Iran)
17 January 2025
19:30

| Bahrain | 1–3 | Thailand |
|---|---|---|
| Sowar 02:26 | Report | Meekham 03:50; Lalida 05:49; Arriya 37:25 |

Nonthaburi Stadium, Nonthaburi
Referee: Gelareh Nazemi (Iran)

19 January 2025
16:30

| Palestine | 1–3 | Bahrain |
|---|---|---|
| Al Rumhi 01:57 | Report | Yaqoob 02:15; Al-Isa 16:08, 39:59 |

Nonthaburi Stadium, Nonthaburi
Referee: Kumi Hiruma (Japan)
19 January 2025
19:30

| Thailand | 4–0 | Lebanon |
|---|---|---|
| Darika 13:54; Paerploy 19:59; Arriya 21:54; Jenjira 37:15 | Report |

Nonthaburi Stadium, Nonthaburi
Referee: Yamamoto Mari (Japan)

=== Group B ===
| Pos | Team | Pld | W | D | L | GF | GA | GD | Pts | Qualification |
|---|---|---|---|---|---|---|---|---|---|---|
| 1 | Indonesia (H) | 3 | 3 | 0 | 0 | 22 | 3 | +19 | 9 | Final tournament |
| 2 | Hong Kong | 3 | 2 | 0 | 1 | 9 | 5 | +4 | 6 | Final tournament |
| 3 | Kyrgyzstan | 3 | 1 | 0 | 2 | 7 | 18 | −11 | 3 | |
| 4 | India | 3 | 0 | 0 | 3 | 3 | 15 | −12 | 0 | |
| 5 | Pakistan | 0 | 0 | 0 | 0 | 0 | 0 | 0 | 0 | Withdrew |

Source: AFC
Rules for classification: Qualification tiebreakers
(H) Hosts
15 January 2025
13:00

| Hong Kong | 5–0 | India |
|---|---|---|
| Cheung Wai Ki 12:12, 22:10, 39:24; Wai Yuen Ting 26:29; Kung Yuet Charis 34:50 | Report |

Among Rogo Sports Hall, Yogyakarta
Referee: Nour Chaito (Lebanon)
15 January 2025
16:00

| Indonesia | 11–3 | Kyrgyzstan |
|---|---|---|
| Diah Tri 03:24, 30:04; Insyafadya 08:00; Fitriya 12:03; Nisma 12:22, 39:05; Boronbekova 18:44 (o.g.); Alya 21:42, 26:28; Dinar 25:36; Fitri 34:46 | Report | Murzakulova 09:33; Boronbekova 11:18; Turalieva 18:00 |

Among Rogo Sports Hall, Yogyakarta
Referee: Mohammad Javad Ehtesham (Iran)

17 January 2025
13:00

| Kyrgyzstan | 0–4 | Hong Kong |
|---|---|---|
| | Report | Cheung Wai Ki 12:01 (pen.), 22:48; So Hoi Lam 18:28; Wai Yuen Ting 29:02 |

Among Rogo Sports Hall, Yogyakarta
Referee: Kana Saito (Japan)
17 January 2025
16:00

| India | 0–6 | Indonesia |
|---|---|---|
| | Report | Ikeu 06:23; Insyafadya 12:24; Fitri 13:16; Novita 19:39; Diah Tri 21:25; Nisma 31:43 |

Among Rogo Sports Hall, Yogyakarta
Referee: Reem Al-Bishi (Saudi Arabia)

19 January 2025
13:00

| India | 3–4 | Kyrgyzstan |
|---|---|---|
| Pant 3'; Saroj 34', 40' | Report | Boronbekova 10'; Murzakulova 12' (pen.); Zamthianmawi 20' (o.g.); Kumyshbek Kyzy 40' |

Among Rogo Sports Hall, Yogyakarta
19 January 2025
16:00

| Indonesia | 5–0 | Hong Kong |
|---|---|---|
| Dinar 21:03, 27:24; Insyafadya 22:16; Jein 30:33; Nisma 32:12 | Report |

Among Rogo Sports Hall, Yogyakarta

=== Group C ===
| Pos | Team | Pld | W | D | L | GF | GA | GD | Pts | Qualification |
|---|---|---|---|---|---|---|---|---|---|---|
| 1 | Australia | 4 | 4 | 0 | 0 | 16 | 3 | +13 | 12 | Final tournament |
| 2 | Uzbekistan (H) | 4 | 2 | 1 | 1 | 15 | 8 | +7 | 7 | Final tournament |
| 3 | Philippines | 4 | 2 | 1 | 1 | 10 | 6 | +4 | 7 | Final tournament |
| 4 | Turkmenistan | 4 | 1 | 0 | 3 | 7 | 17 | −10 | 3 | |
| 5 | Kuwait | 4 | 0 | 0 | 4 | 4 | 18 | −14 | 0 | |

Source: AFC
Rules for classification: Qualification tiebreakers
(H) Hosts
11 January 2025
15:00

| Australia | 6–1 | Turkmenistan |
|---|---|---|
| Fazzari 01:33, 31:50; Camilleri 02:46, 33:58; Fruscalzo 18:07; Tabain 31:00 | Report | Mämmetsähedowa 05:48 |

Yunusobod Sport Complex, Tashkent
Referee: Maryam Al-Hadhrami (Oman)
11 January 2025
18:00

| Kuwait | 1–4 | Philippines |
|---|---|---|
| Basha 35:16 | Report | Guillou 02:01, 38:12; Flanigan 22:02; Tolentin 26:55 |

Yunusobod Sport Complex, Tashkent
Referee: Najat Al-Blooshi (United Arab Emirates)

13 January 2025
15:00

| Philippines | 3–3 | Uzbekistan |
|---|---|---|
| Flanigan 03:52; Guillou 14:23; Connolly 38:02 | Report | Kudratova 07:07; Karachik 22:33, 37:57 |

Yunusobod Sport Complex, Tashkent
Referee: Jo Hyun-jin (South Korea)
13 January 2025
18:00

| Kuwait | 0–5 | Australia |
|---|---|---|
| | Report | Pipino 06:55; Camilleri 15:59; Fazzari 23:23; Tabain 31:30; Mclean 39:37 (2pen.) |

Yunusobod Sport Complex, Tashkent
Referee: Rawand Shwan (Iraq)

15 January 2025
15:00

| Turkmenistan | 0–2 | Philippines |
|---|---|---|
| | Report | Guillou 22:18; Tolentin 29:56 |

Yunusobod Sport Complex, Tashkent
Referee: Suhrob Sattorov (Tajikistan)
15 January 2025
18:00

| Uzbekistan | 5–0 | Kuwait |
|---|---|---|
| Turdiboeva 00:44; Nazarova 10:29; Shoyimova 18:32, 20:13, 26:11 | Report |

Yunusobod Sport Complex, Tashkent
Referee: Majid Al-Hatmi (Oman)

17 January 2025
15:00

| Turkmenistan | 4–3 | Kuwait |
|---|---|---|
| Kurbanowa 10:13, 28:48; Çaryýewa 20:26; Mämmetsähedowa 27:22 | Report | Al-Herz 19:55 (2pen.); Al-Refaie 25:35; Basha 39:34 |

Yunusobod Sport Complex, Tashkent
Referee: Najat Al-Blooshi (United Arab Emirates)
17 January 2025
18:00

| Australia | 3–1 | Uzbekistan |
|---|---|---|
| Mclean 22:15 (pen.); Fazzari 27:17, 39:52 | Report | Nazarova 04:52 |

Yunusobod Sport Complex, Tashkent
Referee: Maryam Al-Hadhrami (Oman)

19 January 2025
15:00

| Australia | 2–1 | Philippines |
|---|---|---|
| Arrowsmith 06:38; Au 20:20 | Report | Smit 19:33 (o.g.) |

Yunusobod Sport Complex, Tashkent
Referee: Moon Daesung (South Korea)
19 January 2025
18:00

| Uzbekistan | 6–2 | Turkmenistan |
|---|---|---|
| Shoyimova 01:17, 02:55, 09:44, 23:03, 33:01; Kudratova 38:40 | Report | Kurbanowa 15:24; Mingazowa 23:52 |

Yunusobod Sport Complex, Tashkent
Referee: Rawand Shwan (Iraq)

=== Group D ===
| Pos | Team | Pld | W | D | L | GF | GA | GD | Pts | Qualification |
|---|---|---|---|---|---|---|---|---|---|---|
| 1 | Vietnam | 3 | 2 | 1 | 0 | 28 | 3 | +25 | 7 | Final tournament |
| 2 | Chinese Taipei | 3 | 2 | 1 | 0 | 24 | 2 | +22 | 7 | Final tournament |
| 3 | Myanmar (H) | 3 | 1 | 0 | 2 | 13 | 10 | +3 | 3 | |
| 4 | Macau | 3 | 0 | 0 | 3 | 1 | 51 | −50 | 0 | |

Source: AFC
Rules for classification: Qualification tiebreakers
(H) Hosts
15 January 2025
14:00

| Chinese Taipei | 18–0 | Macau |
|---|---|---|
| Lu Ching-wen 06:09, 35:01; Liu Chih-ling 07:26; Su Hui-chi 10:51, 25:10, 28:27; Chen Min-huang 11:00, 11:18, 24:19, 29:14; Chen Ya-chun 21:43, 22:29; Ho Chia-Chen 27:16; Liu Wen-Ling 27:40, 32:37, 33:29; Un Pui Kei 28:19 (o.g.); Chang Chi 33:49 | Report |

MFF Futsal Indoor Stadium, Yangon
Referee: Zari Fathi (Iran)
15 January 2025
17:00

| Vietnam | 5–1 | Myanmar |
|---|---|---|
| K'Thủa 02:46, 33:36; Nguyễn Phương Anh 08:35, 13:41; Trần Thị Thu Xuân 11:27 | Report | Ya Min Thant Zin 11:58 |

MFF Futsal Indoor Stadium, Yangon
Referee: Liang Qingyun (China)

17 January 2025
14:00

| Macau | 0–21 | Vietnam |
|---|---|---|
| | Report | Nguyễn Phương Anh 01:48, 10:24; Lê Thị Thanh Ngân 02:36, 22:13; Nguyễn Thị Tú Anh 05:45, 30:05, 31:18, 38:21; Lam Lok I 08:44 (o.g.); Trần Nguyệt Vi 12:43, 27:04; Trần Thị Thùy Trang 13:36 (pen.), 27:40, 33:42; K'Thủa 14:21, 25:58; Trần Thị Thu Xuân 16:27, 18:01, 19:51; Trần Thị Lan Mai 18:15; Nguyễn Thị Vân Anh 19:16 |

MFF Futsal Indoor Stadium, Yangon
Referee: Abdulrahman Al-Doseri (Bahrain)
17 January 2025
17:00

| Myanmar | 0–4 | Chinese Taipei |
|---|---|---|
| | Report | Sung Yun-hsuan 10:58, 37:36, 38:38; Tsou Hsin-ni 17:10 |

MFF Futsal Indoor Stadium, Yangon
Referee: Mohd Norafendy Norhayalan (Malaysia)

19 January 2025
14:00

| Vietnam | 2–2 | Chinese Taipei |
|---|---|---|
| Lê Thị Thanh Ngân 10:05; Biện Thị Hằng 38:48 | Report | Chen Min-haung 09:18; Liu Chih-ling 16:41 |

MFF Futsal Indoor Stadium, Yangon
Referee: Wahyu Wicaksono (Indonesia)
19 January 2025
17:00

| Macau | 1–12 | Myanmar |
|---|---|---|
| Chong Weng Lam 39:57 | Report | Hoi Ka Kei 03:26 (o.g.), 09:13 (o.g.); Zin Nyein Chit 05:36, 19:50; May Thet Paing 21:40, 28:00, 39:30; May Zin Oo 30:27; Wutt Yee Lwin 31:41, 38:53; Ya Min Thant Zin 35:41, 37:45 |

MFF Futsal Indoor Stadium, Yangon
Referee: Zahra Rahimi (Iran)

=== Ranking of third-placed teams ===
The best third-placed team from the four groups will advance to the final tournament along with the four group winners and runners-up. Due to fewer matches in Groups B and D, results against the fifth-placed teams of Groups A and C will not be counted in determining the ranking of the third-placed teams.

| Pos | Grp | Team | Pld | W | D | L | GF | GA | GD | Pts | Qualification |
|---|---|---|---|---|---|---|---|---|---|---|---|
| 1 | C | Philippines | 3 | 1 | 1 | 1 | 6 | 5 | +1 | 4 | Final tournament |
| 2 | D | Myanmar | 3 | 1 | 0 | 2 | 13 | 10 | +3 | 3 | |
| 3 | B | Kyrgyzstan | 3 | 1 | 0 | 2 | 7 | 18 | −11 | 3 | |
| 4 | A | Palestine | 3 | 0 | 1 | 2 | 3 | 12 | −9 | 1 | |

Updated to match(es) played on 15 January 2025. Source: AFC
Rules for classification: Qualification tiebreakers

== Goalscorers ==
There were 212 goals scored in 32 matches, for an average of 6.62 goals per match.

8 goals

- (Uzbekistan) Maftuna Shoyimova

5 goals

- (Australia) Nikkita Fazzari
- (Hong Kong) Cheung Wai Ki
- (Thailand) Arriya Saetoen

4 goals

- (Bahrain) Amira Sowar
- (Chinese Taipei) Chen Min-huang
- (Indonesia) Nisma Francida Rusdiana
- (Philippines) Katrina Guillou
- (Thailand) Darika Peanpailun
- (Thailand) Jenjira Bubpha
- (Vietnam) K'Thủa
- (Vietnam) Nguyễn Phương Anh
- (Vietnam) Nguyễn Thị Tú Anh
- (Vietnam) Trần Thị Thu Xuân

3 goals

- (Australia) Trudy Camilleri
- (Bahrain) Hessa Al-Isa
- (Bahrain) Manar Yaqoob
- (Chinese Taipei) Liu Wen-Ling
- (Chinese Taipei) Su Hui-chi
- (Chinese Taipei) Sung Yun-hsuan
- (Bahrain) Alanood Al Khalifa
- (Indonesia) Diah Tri Lestari
- (Indonesia) Dinar Kartikasari
- (Indonesia) Insyafadya Salsabillah
- (Iraq) Tbarek Al-Ghazawi
- (Myanmar) May Thet Paing
- (Myanmar) Ya Min Thant Zin
- (Palestine) Nour Youssef
- (Thailand) Paerploy Huajaipetch
- (Turkmenistan) Perwana Kurbanowa
- (Vietnam) Lê Thị Thanh Ngân
- (Vietnam) Trần Thị Thùy Trang

2 goals

- (Australia) Jessica Mclean
- (Australia) Marianna Tabain
- (Chinese Taipei) Chen Ya-chun
- (Chinese Taipei) Liu Chih-ling
- (Chinese Taipei) Lu Ching-wen
- (Hong Kong) Wai Yuen Ting
- (India) Khushbu Kashiram Saroj
- (Indonesia) Alya Ananda Hendrita
- (Indonesia) Fitri Rosdiana
- (Iraq) Elaf Shareef
- (Kuwait) Shrouq Basha
- (Kyrgyzstan) Aizhan Boronbekova
- (Kyrgyzstan) Nursuluu Murzakulova
- (Lebanon) Marie Joe Wakim
- (Myanmar) Wutt Yee Lwin
- (Myanmar) Zin Nyein Chit
- (Philippines) Isabella Flanigan
- (Philippines) Dionesa Tolentin
- (Thailand) Lalida Chimpabut
- (Thailand) Sangrawee Meekham
- (Turkmenistan) Suraý Mämmetsähedowa
- (Uzbekistan) Lyudmila Karachik
- (Uzbekistan) Nilufar Kudratova
- (Uzbekistan) Zumratjon Nazarova
- (Vietnam) Trần Nguyệt Vi

1 goal

- (Australia) Daisy Arrowsmith
- (Australia) Jessica Au
- (Australia) Claudia Fruscalzo
- (Australia) Gisella Pipino
- (Bahrain) Leleya Sabkar
- (Chinese Taipei) Chang Chi
- (Chinese Taipei) Chen Min-haung
- (Chinese Taipei) Ho Chia-Chen
- (Chinese Taipei) Tsou Hsin-ni
- (Hong Kong) Kung Yuet Charis
- (Hong Kong) So Hoi Lam
- (India) Drishti Hemant Pant
- (Indonesia) Fitriya Hilda
- (Indonesia) Ikeu Rosita
- (Indonesia) Jein Sitty Way
- (Indonesia) Novita Murni
- (Iraq) Nadia Al-Balahi
- (Iraq) Alaa Lami
- (Kuwait) Noor Al-Herz
- (Kuwait) Abeer Al-Refaie
- (Kyrgyzstan) Nazik Kumyshbek Kyzy
- (Kyrgyzstan) Nagima Turalieva
- (Macau) Chong Weng Lam
- (Myanmar) May Zin Oo
- (Palestine) Dima Al Rumhi
- (Palestine) Hala Sarawi
- (Palestine) Jeniver Shattara
- (Philippines) Judy Connolly
- (Turkmenistan) Mariýa Çaryýewa
- (Turkmenistan) Kamila Mingazowa
- (Uzbekistan) Feruza Turdiboeva
- (Vietnam) Biện Thị Hằng
- (Vietnam) Nguyễn Thị Vân Anh
- (Vietnam) Trần Thị Lan Mai

1 own goal

- (Australia) Halle Smit (against Philippines)
- (Bahrain) Leleya Sabkar (against Iraq)
- (India) Rebecca Zamthianmawi (against Kyrgyzstan)
- (Iraq) Bahra Mohammed (against Thailand)
- (Kyrgyzstan) Aizhan Boronbekova (against Indonesia)
- (Macau) Lam Lok I (against Vietnam)
- (Macau) Un Pui Kei (against Chinese Taipei)
- (Palestine) Narin Abu Asfar (against Thailand)
- (Palestine) Sireen Ghattas (against Iraq)

2 own goals

- (Macau) Hoi Ka Kei (against Myanmar)

== Qualified teams ==
The following nine teams qualified for the final tournament.

| Team | Method of qualification | Date of qualification | Finals appearance | Last appearance | Previous best performance |
|---|---|---|---|---|---|
| China | Hosts | 13 September 2024 | 3rd | 2018 | Quarter-finals (2018) |
| Iran | 2018 champions | 30 August 2024 | 3rd | 2018 | Champions (2015, 2018) |
| Japan | 2018 runners-up | 30 August 2024 | 3rd | 2018 | Runners-up (2015, 2018) |
| Thailand | Group A winners | 17 January 2025 | 3rd | 2018 | Third place (2015, 2018) |
| Bahrain | Group A runners-up | 19 January 2025 | 2nd | 2018 | Group stage (2018) |
| Indonesia | Group B winners | 17 January 2025 | 2nd | 2018 | Quarter-finals (2018) |
| Hong Kong | Group B runners-up | 17 January 2025 | 3rd | 2018 | Group stage (2015, 2018) |
| Australia | Group C winners | 17 January 2025 | 1st | N/A | N/A (Debut) |
| Uzbekistan | Group C runners-up | 19 January 2025 | 3rd | 2018 | Quarter-finals (2018) |
| Vietnam | Group D winners | 17 January 2025 | 3rd | 2018 | Fourth place (2018) |
| Chinese Taipei | Group D runners-up | 17 January 2025 | 2nd | 2018 | Quarter-finals (2018) |
| Philippines | Best third-placed team | 17 January 2025 | 1st | N/A | N/A (Debut) |
