= Khalat Al-Zebari =

Iraqi football and futsal player (born 1996)

Personal information
- Full name: Khalat Asaad Mustafa Al-Zebari
- Date of birth: 12 August 1996 (age 30)
- Place of birth: Aqrah, Duhok Iraq
- Position: Goalkeeper

Team information
- Current team: Al-Zawraa

Senior career*
| Years | Team | Apps | (Gls) |
| 2022– | Al-Zawraa | | |

International career^{‡}
| 2017– | Iraq | 5 | (0) |
| 2022– | Iraq (futsal) | | |
Medal record
Women's football
Representing Iraq
WAFF Women's Futsal Championship
| Gold medal – first place | 2022 |
- * Club domestic league appearances and goals as of 1 August 2022 ‡ National team caps and goals as of 1 August 2022

Khalat Asaad Mustafa Al-Zebari (Arabic: خلات أسعد مصطفى الزيباري; born 12 August 1996) is an Iraqi football and futsal player who plays as a goalkeeper for the Iraqi club Al-Zawraa.

== International career ==
Khalat Al-Zebari has been capped for Iraq at senior level in both football and futsal.

In football, she represented Iraq in the 2018 AFC Women's Asian Cup qualification in 2017, where she played five games.

In futsal, Khalat Al-Zebari was selected by coach Shahnaz Yari as one of the 14 players to compete in the WAFF Women's Futsal Championship in 2022. Iraq won its first title after beating Saudi Arabia in the final.

== Honours ==
Iraq (futsal)

- WAFF Women's Futsal Championship: 2022

== See also ==
- Women's football in Iraq
