= Bahrain women's national futsal team =

Sports, Futsal Team

Bahrain
- Shirt badge/Association crest
- Nickname(s): سَيِّداتُ الأَحْمَر (Sayyidātu Al-Aḥmar, The Reds' Ladies)
- Association: Bahrain Football Association (BFA)
- Confederation: AFC (Asia)
- Head coach: (Brazil) Lino Gomes
- Captain: H.E. Sh. Al-Anood Al Khalifa
- FIFA code: BHR
- FIFA ranking: 32 ▲4 (4 April 2025)
- Highest FIFA ranking: 36 (October 2024)
- Lowest FIFA ranking: 37 (May 2024)
Home colours	Away colours

Biggest win
- Bahrain 11–2 Saudi Arabia (Qurain City, Kuwait; 27 October 2019)

Biggest defeat
- Bahrain 0–13 Japan (Bangkok, Thailand; 5 May 2018)

AFC Women's Futsal Asian Cup
- Appearances: 2 (First in 2018)
- Best result: Group stage (2018, 2025)

WAFF Women's Futsal Championship
- Appearances: 2 (First in 2012)
- Best result: (bronze) Third place (2012, 2022)

The Bahrain women's national futsal team (Arabic: منتخب البحرين الوطني لكرة الصالات للسيدات) represents the Kingdom of Bahrain in international futsal competitions and is controlled by the Bahrain Football Association (BFA).

== History ==
Formed in the mid-to-late 2000s, playing their first-ever match in 2007. They became the first women's futsal team established in the Gulf region. Although the team missed the inaugural 2008 WAFF Women's Futsal Championship and had limited opportunities for international competition early on, they made a notable breakthrough in 2012 when Bahrain hosted the second edition of the WAFF Championship in Manama. In their tournament debut, the team reached the semifinals and secured their first-ever medal — a bronze — after defeating Lebanon 8–5 in the third-place match.

Following that success, the team went on a six-year hiatus before returning to the international stage at the 2018 AFC Women's Futsal Championship. However, they were eliminated in the group stage after losing all three matches.

In 2019, Bahrain participated in the inaugural GCC Women's Games, dominating the competition and winning their first gold medal. Already recognized as a prominent name in women's futsal in the West Asian region, Bahrain defended their title at the 2022 GCC Games, securing another gold, which was followed by a bronze medal at the 2022 WAFF Women's Futsal Championship.

In 2023, the team took part in their first invitational tournament abroad — the NSDF Women's Futsal Championship in Thailand — competing alongside some of Asia's top sides. Bahrain claimed the bronze medal after a 2–1 victory over China in the third-place playoff.

With the launch of the FIFA Women's Futsal World Cup, the AFC rebranded its continental competition as the AFC Women's Futsal Asian Cup, which now serves as the qualification route to the World Cup. In the qualifiers for the inaugural edition to be held in the Philippines in 2025, Bahrain were drawn into Group A. The team remained unbeaten against fellow Arab opponents, losing only to hosts Thailand, and became the only Arab and West Asian team to qualify for the final tournament.

== Results and fixtures ==
The following is a list of match results in the last 12 months, as well as any future matches that have been scheduled.

Legend

Win Draw Lose Void or Postponed Fixture

=== 2024 ===
23 October Friendly	Morocco	5–1	Bahrain	Salé, Morocco

24 October Friendly	Uzbekistan	4–1	Bahrain	Salé, Morocco

26 October Friendly	Morocco	6–1	Bahrain	Salé, Morocco

27 October Friendly	Bahrain	3–8	Uzbekistan	Salé, Morocco

28 November Friendly	Bahrain	3–0	Kuwait	Riffa, Bahrain

30 November Friendly	Bahrain	6–2	Kuwait	Riffa, Bahrain

17 December Friendly	Bahrain	1–4	Indonesia	Riffa, Bahrain

19 December Friendly	Bahrain	3–2	Indonesia	Riffa, Bahrain

=== 2025 ===
11 January 2025 Asian Cup qualification	Bahrain	1–1	Lebanon	Nonthaburi, Thailand
16:30	Al Khalifa 26:41	Report	Wakim 12:38	Stadium: Nonthaburi Stadium; Referee: Ali Ahmadi (Iran)

13 January 2025 Asian Cup qualification	Iraq	5–9	Bahrain	Nonthaburi, Thailand
16:30	Al-Ghazawi 11:39; Al-Balahi 25:48; Shareef 26:23; Lami 33:33; Sabkar 39:39 (o.g.)	Report	Al Khalifa 02:07, 27:45; Sowar 02:57, 14:49, 23:11; Yaqoob 03:41, 14:18; Sabkar 13:43; Al-Isa 39:59	Stadium: Nonthaburi Stadium, Nonthaburi; Referee: Nikita Afingenov (Uzbekistan)

17 January 2025 Asian Cup qualification	Bahrain	1–3	Thailand	Nonthaburi, Thailand
19:30	Sowar 02:26	Report	Meekham 03:50; Lalida 05:49; Arriya 37:25	Stadium: Nonthaburi Stadium; Referee: Gelareh Nazemi (Iran)

19 January 2025 Asian Cup qualification	Palestine	1–3	Bahrain	Nonthaburi, Thailand
16:30	Al Rumhi 01:57	Report	Yaqoob 02:15; Al-Isa 16:08, 39:59	Stadium: Nonthaburi Stadium; Referee: Kumi Hiruma (Japan)

20 March Friendly	Bahrain	0–4	Russia	Manama, Bahrain
21:30 UTC+3		Report	Zimirova 6', 23'; Samoilova 13'; Sintsova 22'	Stadium: Bahrain FA Arena

22 March Friendly	Bahrain	0–4	Russia	Manama, Bahrain
21:30 UTC+3		Report	Zimirova 13', 30'; Khlebosolova 28'; Sharapova 37'	Stadium: Bahrain FA Arena

5 April Friendly	Bahrain	3–2	Morocco	Riffa, Bahrain

7 April Friendly	Bahrain	1–2	Morocco	Riffa, Bahrain

== Players ==
=== Current squad ===
The following 14 players were called-up for friendly matches against Russia on 20 and 22 March 2025.

No.	Pos.	Player	Date of birth (age)	Club
1	GK	Amna Hussein		
2	GK	Hiba Salem		
12	GK	Khulood Saleh Adam	13 December 1997 (age 27)	
3	FP	Eman Al-Khattal	14 March 1999 (age 26)	
4	FP	Fatema Al-Nesuf	19 September 1998 (age 26)	
5	FP	H.E. Sh. Al-Anood Al Khalifa	10 July 1992 (age 32)	
7	FP	Rawan Al-Ali	26 October 2000 (age 24)	(Saudi Arabia) United Eagles
9	FP	Hessa Al-Isa	30 August 1995 (age 29)	(Saudi Arabia) United Eagles
10	FP	Leleya Sabkar	15 July 2002 (age 22)	(Saudi Arabia) United Eagles
11	FP	Rose Tobellah	28 January 1998 (age 27)	
13	FP	Manar Yaqoob	27 July 1994 (age 30)	
14	FP	Dalal Abdulla		
22	FP	Fatima Salman		
30	FP	Sama Qasem	15 January 2006 (age 19)	

== Competitive record ==
=== FIFA Futsal Women's World Cup ===
FIFA Futsal Women's World Cup record
Year	Position	Pld	W	D*	L	GF	GA
(Philippines) 2025	Did not qualify						
Total	0/1	—	—	—	—	—	—

=== AFC Women's Futsal Asian Cup ===
AFC Women's Futsal Asian Cup record									Qualification record					
Year	Round	Result	Pld	W	D*	L	GF	GA	Pld	W	D	L	GF	GA
(Malaysia) 2015	Did not enter								No qualifying tournament was used					
(Thailand) 2018	Group stage	13th	3	0	0	3	4	21	No qualifying tournament was used					
(China) 2025	Group stage	12th	3	0	0	3	3	12	4	2	1	1	14	10
Total	Group stage	2/3	6	0	0	6	7	33	4	2	1	1	14	10

*Draws include knockout matches decided on penalty kicks.

=== WAFF Women's Futsal Championship ===
WAFF Women's Futsal Championship record
Year	Position	Pld	W	D*	L	GF	GA
(Jordan) 2008	Did not enter						
(Bahrain) 2012	3rd	4	2	0	2	17	17
(Saudi Arabia) 2022	3rd	4	3	0	1	9	1
Total	2/3	8	5	0	3	26	18

=== Other tournaments ===
Tournament	Round	Result
(Kuwait) 2019 GCC Women's Games	Round-robin	(gold) Gold medalist
(Kuwait) 2022 GCC Games	Final	(gold) Gold medalist
(Thailand) 2023 NSDF Women's Championship	Third place match	(bronze) Third place
