= Women's football in Oman =

Women's football in Oman was officially established in 2015, with the formation of the Women's Football Department of the Oman Football Association. Despite a club competition or national team not having been formed yet, in 2022 the women's futsal team was unveiled and participated in the 2022 WAFF Women's Futsal Championship.

== History ==
Like most of its Arab neighbours, including the fellow countries in the Gulf Cooperation Council, Oman has a long history of discrimination against women, thus women's sport in Oman has struggled to coexist with their men's counterpart. Although Oman has made better progress than some of her neighbours on women's rights and has a more relaxed law, women's sports, including football, remain obsolete for many Omani women by 2015.

Several initiatives to promote football were made as far as early 2000s, in which football is emphasised. In 2015, the OFA officially established the Women's Football Department. In 2018, Maha Janoud, a Syrian woman who became the first woman to coach a men's team in West Asia, expressed her desire to plant the women's football seed in Oman and has been working with the Omani officials to materialise this from the grassroots. In 2020, several advancements were made with over 30 women's teams and 16 women's clubs at all level, though none of them has been professional so far. Currently, Oman has no official women's football league.

In August 2021, Oman's neighbour Saudi Arabia announced the creation of a new women's team and appointed a new manager, in response to the growing interests toward women's football in the region. Due to the influence of Saudi Arabia in the regional nations of the GCC and the country's main newspaper, Arab News, called for the development of women's football across the Arab countries, it is expected that Oman may field a women's national team in the future. In response, at the same month, Oman began the process to establish a full-time women's football team.

In May 2022, Oman unveiled its women's futsal team for the first time ever (which was wrongly labelled as its football team in various Omani media) to take part in the 2022 WAFF Women's Futsal Championship held in Saudi Arabia; nonetheless this is also an indication of growing interest toward a potential official women's football team to be fully established by the Oman.

== Representative teams ==
=== Baroucher ===
In 2006, a team representing the country, Baroucher, played in the Women's Sevens Tournament in Abu Dhabi. The tournament was a seven-a-side one and they were in Group A, where they finished last overall. On 21 February, they lost 1–5 to Abu Dhabi. On 23 February, they lost 2–3 to a team from Jordan. On 24 February, they lost 0–3 to Iraq. On 25 February, they lost to Syria 0–9. In group play, they had a total of 3 goals for and 20 against.

=== Five-a-side ===
In 2006, Oman hosted and played in a five-a-side women's championship. Other countries participating in the tournament included Pakistan, Bahrain, Syria, Palestine, United Arab Emirates, Lebanon, Afghanistan.

=== Futsal ===
A club team representing the country participated in the fifth Arab Women's Futsal Championship in Amman, Jordan.

In June 2022, the Oman women's national futsal team made a history by debuting in the 2022 WAFF Women's Futsal Championship, the first ever competitive women's football team of the country to participate in the tournament. Oman finished bottom in the group, losing both games in their maiden appearance, and then went on to lose the 5th place play-off.
