= Bahra Mohammed =

Iraqi football and futsal player (born 1993)

Personal information
- Full name: Bahra Dara Mohammed
- Date of birth: 1 February 1993 (age 33)
- Place of birth: Sulaymaniyah, Iraq
- Position: Defender

Team information
- Current team: Naft Al-Shamal
- Number: 3

Senior career*
Years	Team	Apps	(Gls)
2022–	Naft Al-Shamal		

International career
2017–	Iraq	5	(0)
2022–	Iraq (futsal)	4	(0)
Medal record
Women's football
Representing Iraq
WAFF Women's Futsal Championship
Gold medal – first place	2022
- * Club domestic league appearances and goals

Bahra Dara Mohammed (Arabic: به هره دارا محمد; born 1 February 1993) is an Iraqi professional football and futsal player who plays as a defender for Iraqi club Naft Al-Shamal.

== International career ==
Bahra Mohammed has been capped for Iraq at senior level in both football and futsal.

In football, she represented Iraq in the 2018 AFC Women's Asian Cup qualification in 2017, where she played five games.

In futsal, Bahra Mohammed played for Iraq at the WAFF Women's Futsal Championship in 2022 and guided the team as captain to win the title for the first time in its history.

== Honours ==
Iraq (futsal)

- WAFF Women's Futsal Championship: 2022

Naft Al-Shamal

- WAFF Women's Clubs Championship third place: 2022

== See also ==
- Women's football in Iraq
