= Raghad Mukhayzin =

Saudi footballer

Personal information
- Full name: Raghad Ahmed Ali Mukhayzin
- Date of birth: 24 October 1996 (age 30)
- Place of birth: Saudi Arabia
- Positions: Defender; defensive midfielder

Team information
- Current team: Al Qadsiah
- Number: 23

Senior career*
Years	Team	Apps	(Gls)
2013–2017	Al-Sameer		
2017–2019	Jeddah Waves		
2019–2020	Miraas		
2020–2022	Storm		
2022–2023	Al-Shabab	14	(1)
2023–2025	Al-Ahli	8	(0)
2025–	Al Qadsiah		

International career^{‡}
2021–	Saudi Arabia Futsal	11	(3)
2021–	Saudi Arabia	43	(5)
- * Club domestic league appearances and goals as of 30 December 2023 ‡ National team caps and goals as of 2 December 2025

Raghad Ahmed Ali Mukhayzin (Arabic: رَغَد أَحْمَد عَلِيّ مُخَيْزِن; born 24 October 1996) is a Saudi professional footballer who plays as a defender for saudi Women's Premier League club Al Qadsiah and the Saudi Arabia national team.

== Club career ==
=== Pre-Prominence Journey & Early Career Highlights: 2013–2022 ===
Mukhayzin began her football career at a young age, practicing her passion since the age of five with her siblings. She entered women's football before gaining prominence, playing with six different teams. She started with Al-Sameer team in 2013, playing until 2017, and then moved to Jeddah Waves in 2017. In 2019 she joined Miraas team (now Al-Ahli) for one season before, signing with the Storm (now Al-Shabab). Played for the Storm in the inaugural SAFF Women's National Football Championship Regional west, Mukhayzin was named the tournament best player.

=== Al-Shabab: 2022–2023 ===
Following the acquisition of Storm Women FC by Al-Shabab, Mukhayzin remained with the team for the 2022–23 season of the Premier League. On 14 October 2022, She played her first game for the White Lioness in a 2–4 loss to Al Hilal. On 11 February 2023, She scored her sole goal with the club during the 35th minute in the league's biggest win a 19–0 victory against Sama. This result contributed to the team's overall finish in the 3rd position.

=== Al-Ahli: 2023–2025 ===
In September 2023, Al-Ahli announced the signing of Mukhayzin. On 14 October 2023 she debuted for Al-Ahli, starting in a 0–1 loss to Al-Shabab.

=== Al Qadsiah: 2025–present ===
In July 2025, Mukhayzin moved to Al Qadsiah.

== International career ==
Mukhayzin played for the first time at an international level in 2021 while representing the Saudi Arabia women's national futsal team.

In February 2022, Mukhayzin was named as part of the first-ever Saudi Arabia women's national football team for the two friendlies against Seychelles and the Maldives women's national football team. On 20 February 2022, she made her debut when she came off the bench in the 85th minute at 2–0 against Seychelles.

In June 2022, She was selected to be a part of Saudi Arabia's debut squad at the 2022 WAFF Women's Futsal Championship, where the team clinched silver. in the tournament, Raghad scored a brace in the Green Flacons's 5–0 win against Oman.

== Personal life ==
Mukhayzin is a Nursing Specialist and a graduate of King Saud University for Health Sciences.

== Career statistics ==
=== Club ===
As of match played 30 December 2023

Appearances and goals by club, season and competition
Club	Season	League			Cup		Continental		Other		Total	
Club	Season	Division	Apps	Goals	Apps	Goals	Apps	Goals	Apps	Goals	Apps	Goals
Al-Shabab	2023–24	SWPL	14	1	—		—		—		14	1
Al-Shabab	Total		14	1	—		—		—		14	1
Al-Ahli	2023–24	SWPL	6	0	2	0	—		—		8	0
Al-Ahli	Total		6	0	2	0	—		—		8	0
Career total			20	1	2	0	—		—		22	1

=== International ===
As of match played 8 April 2025

Appearances and goals by national team and year
National team	Year	Apps	Goals
Saudi Arabia	2022	3	0
Saudi Arabia	2023	13	0
Saudi Arabia	2024	2	0
Saudi Arabia	2025	4	3
Total		22	3

No.	Date	Venue	Opponent	Score	Result	Competition
1.	23 February 2025	King Abdullah Sports City, Jeddah, Saudi Arabia	Tajikistan	4–0	4–0	Friendly
2.	5 April 2025	Prince Saud bin Jalawi Stadium, Khobar, Saudi Arabia	Sri Lanka	1–0	2–0	Friendly
3.	8 April 2025	Prince Saud bin Jalawi Stadium, Khobar, Saudi Arabia	Hong Kong	1–2	1–2	Friendly
4.	29 October 2025	321 Stadium, Dubai, United Arab Emirates	Singapore	1–0	5–0	Friendly
5.	24 November 2025	King Abdullah Sports City, Jeddah, Saudi Arabia	Iraq	1–0	2–1	2025 WAFF Women's Championship
6.	2 March 2026	Prince Saud bin Jalawi Stadium, Khobar, Saudi Arabia	Kyrgyzstan	1–0	2–0	Friendly

== Honours ==
Al-Ahli

- SAFF Women's Cup:

(gold) Champion: 2023–24

Al Yamamah

- Women's Futsal Tournament:

(gold) Champion: 2023

Saudi Arabia

- SAFF Women's International Friendly Tournament:

(gold) Champion: Khobar 2023

Saudi Arabia futsal

- WAFF Women's Futsal Championship:

(silver) Runner-up: 2022
