= Tiba Al-Quraishi =

Iraqi football and futsal player (born 1996)

Personal information
- Full name: Tiba Saleem Abdulmaged Al-Quraishi
- Date of birth: 13 January 1996 (age 30)
- Place of birth: Iraq
- Position: Midfielder

Team information
- Current team: Al-Zawraa
- Number: 15

Senior career*
| Years | Team | Apps | (Gls) |
| 2021– | Al-Zawraa | | |

International career^{‡}
| 2017– | Iraq | 3 | (0) |
| 2022– | Iraq (futsal) | 4 | (1) |
Medal record
Women's football
Representing Iraq
WAFF Women's Futsal Championship
| Gold medal – first place | 2022 |
- * Club domestic league appearances and goals as of 1 August 2022 ‡ National team caps and goals as of 1 August 2022

Tiba Saleem Abdulmaged Al-Quraishi (Arabic: طَيِّبَة سَلِيم عَبْد الْمَجِيد الْقُرَيْشِيّ; born 13 January 1996) is an Iraqi football and futsal player who plays as a midfielder for Iraqi club Al-Zawraa.

== International career ==
Tiba Al-Quraishi has been capped for Iraq at senior level in both football and futsal.

In football, she represented Iraq in the 2018 AFC Women's Asian Cup qualification in 2017, where she played three games.

In futsal, Tiba Al-Quraishi played for Iraq at the WAFF Women's Futsal Championship in 2022 and scored a goal in the semi-final against Kuwait which helped Iraq reach the final and win the title for the first time in its history.

== Honours ==
Iraq (futsal)

- WAFF Women's Futsal Championship: 2022

== See also ==
- Women's football in Iraq
