= Hessa Al-Isa =

Bahraini footballer (born 1995)

Hessa AlIsa
Personal information
- Full name: Hessa Reyadh Mohamed Jasim Al Isa
- Date of birth: 30 August 1995 (age 31)
- Place of birth: Bahrain
- Position: Attacking midfielder

Team information
- Current team: United Eagles
- Number: 9

Senior career*
Years	Team	Apps	(Gls)
2017–2018	Super Soccer Academy	12	(0)
2018–2019	Al-Riffa	12	(23)
2019–2021	Salwa AlSabah (futsal)		
2021–2022	Al Mamlaka		
2022–2023	Al Nassr	14	(15)
2024–2025	United Eagles	4	(7)
2025	Al Nahda	13	(9)

International career
2018–	Bahrain	7	(4)
2018–	Bahrain (futsal)		(+16)
- * Club domestic league appearances and goals as of 20 November 2025

Hessa Reyadh Mohamed Jasim Al-Isa (Arabic: حِصَّـة رِيَاض مُحَمَّد جَاسِم الْعِيسَى; born 30 August 1995) is a Bahraini football, volleyball and futsal player who played as an attacking midfielder for Saudi Arabian club United Eagles in the Saudi Women's First Division League, and plays for the Bahrain's national football team, national futsal team and national volleyball team.

== Club career ==
=== 2017–2018: Debut season ===
Al-Isa's senior career began with the Bahraini team Super Soccer Academy. She made her debut on 20 November 2017, starting in a 3–0 win over Black Castle Academy.

=== Al-Riffa Blue Pearls ===
==== 2018–2019: First league title ====
Prior to the 2018–19 season, Al-Isa joined Al-Riffa Blue Pearls the current defending champions of the Bahraini women's league. On 6 February 2019, She debuted for the club in a 13–0 win against Eastern Flames, scoring her first goal in the league in the same match. Al-Isa scored 18 goals in the season and was named the BWFL top scorer. Al-Riffa as Champion of the Bahrain Women's Football League qualified to participate in the first WAFF Women's Clubs Championship. Al-Isa scored five goals in the tournament including a super-hattrick against Palestine's Arab Orthodox Cultural club.

=== Salwa AlSabah ===
==== 2019–2021: Inaugural Futsal Professional Journey ====
In the Mid-way of the 2019–2020 season, Salwa Al-Sabah's Kuwaiti women's side announced the signing of Bahraini Al-Isa to strengthen their team.

In November 2020, Salwa Al-Sabah extended Al-Isa contract for another season.

=== Al Mamlaka & Al Nassr ===
==== 2021–2022: Al Mamlaka ====
In 2021, Al-Isa moved to Saudi Arabia to play for Al-Mamlaka women's football club (currently Al Nassr), competing in the first Saudi Women's Football Championship. She led her team to win the championship after contributing to a sweeping victory over the challenger WFC, with a score of 7–0, scoring five of the seven goals. She was named the championship's top scorer.

==== 2022–2023: Al Nassr ====
After Al Nassr acquired the team, Al-Isa's contract was renewed for one season. On 21 October 2023, she debuted for Al-Nassr in a massive 18–0 win as a starter, scoring a super-hattrick in the same match. Al-Isa helped Al Nassr winning the league for the first time in the kingdom history, scoring 15 goals in the season she finished co-jointly third in the ranking of top scorers.

== International career ==
AlIsa has been capped for Bahrain at the senior level in both football, volleyball, and futsal.

=== 2019 WAFF Women's Championship, Bahrain ===
In January 2019, Alisa was named to the Bahrain women's squad to compete at the 2019 WAFF Women's Championship. After scoring two goals in the opening match against Lebanon and one goal against UAE and Palestine Respectively. she was named the tournament's Best player.

=== 2019 GCC Women's Games, Kuwait ===
In 2019 Alisa was named to Bahrain's 2019 GCC Women's Games futsal squad. marking its debut in the Futsal team, she scored 7 goals in total. Bahrain emerged as the winner winning all matches.

== Personal life ==
Hessa's Brother Naser Alisa is also a Football Player.

Hessa is a graduate of the Bahraini Royal University for Women in human resources.

== Career statistics ==
=== International ===
==== Football ====
No.	Date	Venue	Opponent	Score	Result	Competition
1.	7 January 2019	Al Muharraq Stadium, Arad, Bahrain	Lebanon	2–1	3–2	2019 WAFF Women's Championship
2.	7 January 2019	Al Muharraq Stadium, Arad, Bahrain	Lebanon	3–1	3–2	2019 WAFF Women's Championship
3.	9 January 2019	Al Muharraq Stadium, Arad, Bahrain	Palestine	2–0	5–0	2019 WAFF Women's Championship
4.	13 January 2019	Al Muharraq Stadium, Arad, Bahrain	United Arab Emirates	1–0	1–1	2019 WAFF Women's Championship
5.	4 June 2024	Al Ahli Stadium, Manama, Bahrain	Palestine	1–1	1–2	Friendly
6.	2 June 2025	UAEFA Stadium, Al-Khawaneej, United Arab Emirates	United Arab Emirates	2–1	2–2	Friendly
7.	2 July 2025	Thuwunna Stadium, Yangon, Myanmar	Turkmenistan	2–2	2–2	2026 AFC Women's Asian Cup qualification

==== Futsal ====
No.	Date	Venue	Opponent	Score	Result	Competition
1.	3 May 2018	Bangkok Arena, Bangkok, Thailand	China	1–0	2–5	2018 AFC Women's Futsal Championship
2.	6 April 2019	Salwa Al Sabah SC Arena, Kuwait City, Kuwait	Kuwait	2–0	4–1	Friendly
3.	27 October 2019	Salwa Al Sabah SC Arena, Kuwait City, Kuwait	Saudi Arabia	5–0	11–2	2019 GCC Women's Games
4.	28 October 2019	Salwa Al Sabah SC Arena, Kuwait City, Kuwait	United Arab Emirates	1–0	7–1	2019 GCC Women's Games
5.	28 October 2019	Salwa Al Sabah SC Arena, Kuwait City, Kuwait	United Arab Emirates	4–0	7–1	2019 GCC Women's Games
6.	28 October 2019	Salwa Al Sabah SC Arena, Kuwait City, Kuwait	United Arab Emirates	6–0	7–1	2019 GCC Women's Games
7.	28 October 2019	Salwa Al Sabah SC Arena, Kuwait City, Kuwait	United Arab Emirates	7–0	7–1	2019 GCC Women's Games
8.	30 October 2019	Salwa Al Sabah SC Arena, Kuwait City, Kuwait	Kuwait	2–0	4–0	2019 GCC Women's Games
9.	16 May 2022	Sheikh Saad Al Abdullah Sports Complex, Sabah Al-Salem, Kuwait	Saudi Arabia	3–1	4–1	2022 GCC Games
10.	21 May 2022	Sheikh Saad Al Abdullah Sports Complex, Sabah Al-Salem, Kuwait	United Arab Emirates	1–1	5–3	2022 GCC Games
11.	21 May 2022	Sheikh Saad Al Abdullah Sports Complex, Sabah Al-Salem, Kuwait	United Arab Emirates	3–2	5–3	2022 GCC Games
12.	21 May 2022	Sheikh Saad Al Abdullah Sports Complex, Sabah Al-Salem, Kuwait	United Arab Emirates	5–3	5–3	2022 GCC Games
13.	24 May 2022	Sheikh Saad Al Abdullah Sports Complex, Sabah Al-Salem, Kuwait	Kuwait	2–0	2–0	2022 GCC Games
14.	16 June 2022	King Abdullah Sports City, Jeddah, Saudi Arabia	Palestine	3–0	6–0	2022 WAFF Women's Futsal Championship
15.	16 June 2022	King Abdullah Sports City, Jeddah, Saudi Arabia	Palestine	5–0	6–0	2022 WAFF Women's Futsal Championship
16.	16 June 2022	King Abdullah Sports City, Jeddah, Saudi Arabia	Palestine	6–0	6–0	2022 WAFF Women's Futsal Championship

== Honours ==
=== Salwa AlSabah ===
- Kuwaiti Women Futsal League:

Champions: 2019-20

=== Bahrain (Football) ===
- WAFF Women's Championship:

Runners-up: 2019

=== Al Mamlaka ===
- Saudi Women's Premier League:

Champions: 2021-22

=== Bahrain (Futsal) ===
- GCC Women's Games:

Champions: 2019

- GCC Games:

Champions: 2022

- WAFF Women's Futsal Championship:

Third place: 2022

=== Individual ===
- WAFF Women's Championship Best player: 2019
