= Fatat Al-Basra SC =

Iraqi football club

- Full name: Fatat Al-Basra Sport Club
- Founded: 1994; 31 years ago
- Chairman: Lamyaa Hassan Al-Diwan

Fatat Al-Basra Sport Club (Arabic: نادي فتاة البصرة الرياضي, lit. 'Basra Girls Club'), is an Iraqi women's multi-sport club based in Al-Ashar, Basra. The club's fencing team is the best, as it won the Iraqi Elite League.

== Beginning and establishment ==
In the presence of the representative of the Women's Sports Committee in National Olympic Committee, Dr. Fatima Yas Al-Hashemi, it was decided to establish the Fatat Al-Basra Sports Club in Basra, and a temporary administrative body was formed headed by Mrs. Khawla Abdullah Al-Mayouf for a period of six months. On September 10, 1994, the Fatat Al-Basra Sports Club was established by a decision of the President of the National Olympic Committee.

== Board members ==
| Position | Name |
|---|---|
| President | (Iraq) Lamyaa Al-Diwan |
| Vice president | (Iraq) Awatif Abdul-Karim Al-Dahman |
| Secretary | (Iraq) Siham Karim Jassim |
| Treasurer | (Iraq) Maysoon Abdul-Jalil Abdul-Hassan |
| Member of the Board | (Iraq) Eiman Saleh Mahdi |
| Member of the Board | (Iraq) Kholoud Layeth Abdul-Karim |

== Managers ==
This is a list of coaches who have coached the club's sports teams since its founding.

| Games | Manager(s) |
|---|---|
| Volleyball | (Iraq) Ghassan Abboud / (Iraq) Adel Majeed |
| Futsal | (Iraq) Dhul-Faqar Saleh / (Iraq) Mohammed Ali Faleh / (Iraq) Waleed Khaled |
| Basketball | (Iraq) Mustafa Abdul-Rahman / (Iraq) Ali Ashour |
| Badminton | (Iraq) Kholoud Layeth / (Iraq) Mohammed Ali Al-Saeed |
| Handball | (Iraq) Haider Jassim / (Iraq) Anwar Abdul-Qader |
| Tennis | (Iraq) Muntadher Majeed |
| Table tennis | (Iraq) Lamyaa Al-Diwan |
| Fencing | (Iraq) Mushtaq Hamid / (Iraq) Salam Jaber / (Iraq) Mohammed Aassi |
| Athletics | (Iraq) Shatha Mehawesh / (Iraq) Nahed Hamed |
| Cycling | (Iraq) Sawsan Jabbar |
| Gymnastics | (Iraq) Zahraa Hassan Mohammed |
| Shooting | (Iraq) Qusay Mohammed / (Iraq) Nahed Hamed |

== National teams players ==
This is a list of Fatat Al-Basra players who have represented the Iraq women's national teams.

| Player | National team |
|---|---|
| (Iraq) Raeda Odah | National track and field team |
| (Iraq) Eiman Saleh Mahdi | National volleyball team |
| (Iraq) Shafiqa Jalil | National basketball team |
| (Iraq) Kholoud Layeth | National futsal team |
| (Iraq) Wassan Mushtaq | National futsal team |
| (Iraq) Ashjan Abdul-Karim | National futsal team |
| (Iraq) Sawsan Jabbar | National cycling team |
| (Iraq) Al-Zahraa Hassan | National fencing team |
| (Iraq) Shams Samir Toama | National fencing team |
| (Iraq) Aseel Samir Toama | National fencing team |
| (Iraq) Wydad Ahmed | National fencing team |
| (Iraq) Leena Samir | National fencing team |

== Honours ==
These are the most important local women's tournaments won by club teams

=== National ===
- Iraqi Elite Women's Fencing league:
  - Winners (1): 2011
- Baghdad Women's Futsal Championship:
  - Winners (3): 1996, 2000, 2001
- Baghdad Women's Swimming Championship:
  - Winners (2): 1998, 2001
- Baghdad Women's Chess Championship:
  - Winners (2): 1999, 2001
- Baghdad Women's Table Tennis Championship:
  - Winners (2): 2001, 2002
- Baghdad Women's Fencing Championship:
  - Winners (1): 2009
- Al-Fatat Clubs Basketball Championship:
  - Winners (1): 1994
- Al-Fatat Clubs Badminton Championship:
  - Winners (1): 1995
- Al-Fatat Clubs Volleyball Championship:
  - Winners (3): 2000, 2002, 2003

=== Regional ===
- Basra Women's Badminton Championship:
  - Winners (1): 2001
- Basra Women's Cycling Championship:
  - Winners (2): 2001, 2002
- Basra Women's Volleyball Championship:
  - Winners (1): 2001
- Basra Women's Tennis Championship:
  - Winners (1): 2001

== See also ==
- Iraq women's national futsal team
