= Saudi Arabia women's national futsal team =

Saudi Arabia
- Nickname(s): الأخضر (The Green) الصقور الخضر (The Green Falcons) الصقور العربية (The Arabian Falcons)
- Association: Saudi Arabian Football Federation (الاتحاد العربي السعودي لكرة القدم)
- Confederation: AFC (Asia)
- Head coach: Mato Stanković
- Captain: Leen Mohammed
- FIFA code: KSA
- FIFA ranking: 44 ▲2 (4 April 2025)
| Home colours | Away colours |

First international
- Saudi Arabia 2–5 Lebanon (Riyadh, Saudi Arabia, 14 October 2019)

Biggest win
- Saudi Arabia 5–0 Oman (Jeddah, Saudi Arabia, 20 May 2022)

Biggest defeat
- Saudi Arabia 2–12 Lebanon (Riyadh, Saudi Arabia, 15 October 2019)

WAFF Women's Futsal Championship
- Appearances: 1 (First in 2022)
- Best result: Runners-up (2022)

The Saudi Arabia women's national futsal team represents Saudi Arabia in international women's futsal competitions and is controlled by the Saudi Arabian Football Federation.

== History ==
Established in 2019, the team played two friendlies against their Lebanese counterparts before participating in the inaugural 2019 GCC Women's Games in Kuwait. After a challenging start with a loss to Bahrain 11–2, Saudi Arabia staged an impressive comeback against Kuwait, overcoming a 3–1 deficit at half-time to secure a 4–3 victory. Although they faced a loss on the final day against the UAE, it resulted in a historic bronze medal for the team.

In April 2022, it was announced that Saudi Arabia would be the host nation for its inaugural major women's futsal tournament, the 2022 WAFF Women's Futsal Championship. For their debut appearance, the national team was drawn with Kuwait and debutante Oman. In a historic finish the team finished as runners-up, losing to Iraq 2–4 in the final.

== Results and fixtures ==
Legend

Win Draw Lose Fixture

=== 2019 ===
| 14 October 2019 Friendly | Saudi Arabia | 2–5 | Lebanon | Riyadh, Saudi Arabia |

| 15 October 2019 Friendly | Saudi Arabia | 2–12 | Lebanon | Riyadh, Saudi Arabia |

| 27 October 2019 2019 GCC Women's Games | Bahrain | 11–2 | Saudi Arabia | Kuwait |

| 28 October 2019 2019 GCC Women's Games | Kuwait | 3–4 | Saudi Arabia | Kuwait |

| 30 October 2019 2019 GCC Women's Games | United Arab Emirates | 6–2 | Saudi Arabia | Kuwait |

=== 2022 ===
| 8 May 2022 Friendly | Saudi Arabia | 1–2 | Croatia | Riyadh, Saudi Arabia |
| | | Report |

| 9 May 2022 Friendly | Saudi Arabia | 5–6 | Croatia | Riyadh, Saudi Arabia |
| 18:30 | | Report |

| 16 May 2022 2022 GCC Games | Saudi Arabia | 1–4 | Bahrain | Sabah Al-Salem, Kuwait |
| 14:00 | Tawfiq 15' | Report | Yaqoob 15'; Sowar 17'; AlIsa 25'; AlKhattal 36' | Stadium: Sheikh Saad Al Abdullah Sports Complex; Referee: Ali Hassan (United Arab Emirates) |

| 18 May 2022 2022 GCC Games | Kuwait | 1–2 | Saudi Arabia | Sabah Al-Salem, Kuwait |
| 19:00 | Abdulraheim 20' | Report | Mobarak 8'; R. Abdullah 18' | Stadium: Sheikh Saad Al Abdullah Sports Complex; Referee: Faisal Abdullah (Qatar) |

| 19 May 2022 2022 GCC Games | Saudi Arabia | 2–1 | United Arab Emirates | Sabah Al-Salem, Kuwait |
| 17:00 | Al-Hwsawi 9', 20' | Report | Rashid 28' | Stadium: Sheikh Saad Al Abdullah Sports Complex; Referee: M. AlBuloushi (Kuwait) |

| 21 May 2022 2022 GCC Games Semi-finals | Kuwait | 2–2 (a.e.t.) (3–1 p) | Saudi Arabia | Sabah Al-Salem, Kuwait |
| 19:30 | Mukhayzin 15' (o.g.); Mohammad 47' (pen.) | Report | R. Abdullah 14', 45' (pen.) | Stadium: Sheikh Saad Al Abdullah Sports Complex; Referee: Faisal Abdullah (Qatar) |
| | Penalties |
| | Ahmad (penalty scored); AlMulla (penalty scored); AlRefaie (penalty scored) | | R. Abdullah (penalty missed); Mohammed (penalty missed); Mukhayzin (penalty scored); Ibrahim (penalty missed) |

| 24 May 2022 2022 GCC Games Third place match | United Arab Emirates | 1–4 | Saudi Arabia | Sabah Al-Salem, Kuwait |
| 13:00 | Mohammed 25' (o.g.) | Report | Ibrahim 13'; Mukhayzin 36'; Al-Hwsawi 38'; Mohammed 38' | Stadium: Sheikh Saad Al Abdullah Sports Complex; Referee: E. Al Sayed (Kuwait) |

| 16 June 2022 2022 WAFF Women's Futsal Championship Group B | Kuwait | 3–1 | Saudi Arabia | Jeddah, Saudi Arabia |
| 20:30 | AlMulla 4', 24'; Nour 20' | Report | Reda 37' | Stadium: King Abdullah Sports City |

| 20 June 2022 2022 WAFF Women's Futsal Championship Group B | Saudi Arabia | 5–0 | Oman | Jeddah, Saudi Arabia |
| 20:30 | Mohammed 3'; Mukhayzin 5', 6'; Reda 19', 21' | Report | | Stadium: King Abdullah Sports City |

| 22 June 2022 2022 WAFF Women's Futsal Championship SF | Bahrain | 0–1 (a.e.t.) | Saudi Arabia | Jeddah, Saudi Arabia |
| 18:00 | | Report | Mobarak 44' | Stadium: King Abdullah Sports City |

| 24 June 2022 2022 WAFF Women's Futsal Championship F | Saudi Arabia | 2–4 | Iraq | Jeddah, Saudi Arabia |
| 20:30 | Mohammed 10'; AlHamad 35' | Report | Salihi 23', 39'; Mulla Bakr 34'; Al-Ghazawi 36' | Stadium: King Abdullah Sports City |

=== 2024 ===
| 7 June 2024 Friendly | Saudi Arabia | 3–2 | Serbia | Sarajevo, Bosnia and Herzegovina |
| 20:00 UTC+3 | Tawfiq; Mobarak; Al-Hwsawi | Report |

| 8 June 2024 Friendly | Saudi Arabia | 5–2 | Serbia | Sarajevo, Bosnia and Herzegovina |
| 20:30 UTC+3 | Mobarak ??, ??, ??, ??, ?? | Report |

== Coaching staff ==
=== Current coaching staff ===
| Role | Name |
|---|---|
| Head coach | (Croatia) Mato Stanković |

== Players ==
=== Current squad ===
The following players were called up for the 2022 WAFF Women's Futsal Championship from 16 to 22 June 2022.

| No. | Pos. | Player | Date of birth (age) | Club |
|---|---|---|---|---|
| 1 | GK | Sara Khalid | 2 August 1996 (age 28) | (Saudi Arabia) Al Nassr |
| 2 | GK | Laila Al-Qahtani | 25 September 2000 (age 24) | (Saudi Arabia) Al-Shabab |
| 3 | FP | Leen Mohammed (captain) | 22 March 2003 (age 22) | (Saudi Arabia) Al-Shabab |
| 4 | FP | Tagih Rashwan | 4 May 1998 (age 27) | Unattached |
| 5 | FP | Lana Abdulrazak | 22 May 2005 (age 20) | (Saudi Arabia) Al-Ittihad |
| 6 | FP | Al Bandari Mobarak | 9 December 2001 (age 23) | (Saudi Arabia) Al-Shabab |
| 7 | FP | Noura Ibrahim | 17 September 1998 (age 26) | (Saudi Arabia) Al-Shabab |
| 8 | FP | Al Bandari Al-Hwsawi | 9 May 1993 (age 32) | (Saudi Arabia) Al Hilal |
| 9 | FP | Sara Al-Hamad | 27 June 1992 (age 33) | (Saudi Arabia) Al Nassr |
| 10 | FP | Seba Tawfiq | 13 January 2005 (age 20) | (Saudi Arabia) Al-Ittihad |
| 11 | FP | Asrar Al-Shaibani | 23 July 1995 (age 29) | (Saudi Arabia) Al-Ittihad |
| 12 | FP | Mubarkh Al-Saiari | 19 December 1998 (age 26) | (Saudi Arabia) Al Nassr |
| 13 | FP | Raghad Mukhayzin | 24 October 1996 (age 28) | (Saudi Arabia) Al-Ahli |
| 14 | FP | Athaa Fahad | 13 March 1996 (age 29) | (Saudi Arabia) Al-Shabab |

== Competitive record ==
=== AFC Women's Futsal Asian Cup ===
AFC Women's Futsal Asian Cup record
| Hosts / Year | Result | GP | W | D* | L | GS | GA | GD |
|---|---|---|---|---|---|---|---|---|
| (Malaysia) 2015 | Did not enter | | | | | | | |
| (Thailand) 2018 | Did not enter | | | | | | | |
| (China) 2025 | Did not enter | | | | | | | |
| Total | 0/3 | — | — | — | — | — | — | — |

*Draws include knockout matches decided on penalty kicks.

=== Futsal at the Asian Indoor and Martial Arts Games ===
Futsal at the Asian Indoor and Martial Arts Games record
| Hosts / Year | Result | GP | W | D* | L | GS | GA | GD |
|---|---|---|---|---|---|---|---|---|
| (Thailand) 2005 | Did not enter | | | | | | | |
| (Macau) 2007 | Did not enter | | | | | | | |
| (Vietnam) 2009 | Did not enter | | | | | | | |
| (South Korea) 2013 | Did not enter | | | | | | | |
| (Turkmenistan) 2017 | Did not enter | | | | | | | |
| Total | 0/5 | — | — | — | — | — | — | — |

*Draws include knockout matches decided on penalty kicks.

=== WAFF Women's Futsal Championship ===
WAFF Women's Futsal Championship record
| Hosts / Year | Result | GP | W | D* | L | GS | GA | GD |
|---|---|---|---|---|---|---|---|---|
| (Jordan) 2008 | Did not enter | | | | | | | |
| (Bahrain) 2012 | Did not enter | | | | | | | |
| (Saudi Arabia) 2022 | | | | | | | | |
| Total | 0/2 | — | — | — | — | — | — | — |

*Draws include knockout matches decided on penalty kicks.
