= Direen Mulla Bakr =

Iraqi football and futsal player (born 2000)

Personal information
- Full name: Direen Mahmood Mulla Bakr
- Date of birth: 13 January 2000 (age 26)
- Place of birth: Kirkuk, Iraq
- Position: Midfielder

Team information
- Current team: Naft Al-Shamal
- Number: 19

Senior career*
Years	Team	Apps	(Gls)
2022–	Naft Al-Shamal		(1)
2022–2023	→ Al Hilal (loan)		

International career^{‡}
2017–	Iraq	5	(0)
2022–	Iraq (futsal)	4	(4)
Medal record
Women's football
Representing Iraq
WAFF Women's Futsal Championship
Gold medal – first place	2022
- * Club domestic league appearances and goals as of 1 August 2022 ‡ National team caps and goals as of 1 August 2022

Direen Mahmood Mulla Bakr (Arabic: ديرين محمود ملا بكر; born 13 January 2000) is an Iraqi football and futsal player who plays as a midfielder for Iraqi club Naft Al-Shamal in the Iraqi Women's Football League.

== International career ==
Mulla Bakr has been capped for Iraq at senior level in both football and futsal.

In football, she represented Iraq in the 2018 AFC Women's Asian Cup qualification in 2017, where she played five games.

In futsal, Mulla Bakr played for Iraq at the WAFF Women's Futsal Championship in 2022 and scored four goals including a goal in the final against Saudi Arabia which helped Iraq win the title for the first time in its history.

== Honours ==
Iraq (futsal)

- WAFF Women's Futsal Championship: 2022

Naft Al-Shamal

- WAFF Women's Clubs Championship third place: 2022

== See also ==
- Women's football in Iraq
