= Bahrain Women's Football League =

BFA Women's Football League
- Founded: 2004; 22 years ago
- Country: Bahrain
- Confederation: AFC
- Number of clubs: 5
- Domestic cup: Bahrain Women's Cup
- International cup: WAFF Women's Clubs Championship
- Current champions: Amal Al-Mamlaka (1st title) (2026)
- Current: 2026 W-League

The Bahrain Women's Football League (Arabic: الدوري البحريني للسيدات) called BFA Women's Football League is the top flight of women's association football in Bahrain. The competition is run by the Bahrain Football Association.

== History ==
The first Bahrain Women's League was contested in the 2004–05 season. Matches are played at the BFA Headquarters next to the Bahrain National Stadium.

== Champions ==
The list of champions and runners-up:

Year	Champions	Runners-up
2004–05	Al-Najma SC	Al-Muharraq SC
2005–06		
2006–07		
2007–08		
2008–09		
2009–10		
2010–11	Royal University for Women	Bahrain Training Institute
2011–12	Arsenal Yellow	Joga Bonito
2012–13	Arsenal Ladies	
2013–14	Arsenal Ladies	Venus Tekkers
2014–15	Venus Tekkers	Arsenal Ladies
2015–16	Riffa Blue Pearls	Talent
2016–17	Riffa Blue Pearls	Venus Tekkers
2017–18	Riffa Blue Pearls	Muharraq Tekkers
2018–19	Riffa Blue Pearls	Muharraq Tekkers
2019–20	abandoned because of the COVID-19 pandemic in Bahrain	
2020–21	canceled because of the COVID-19 pandemic in Bahrain	
2021–22	Ravens FC	Seef FC
2026	Amal Al-Mamlaka	Bahrain Club

== Most successful clubs ==
Club	Number of Championships
Riffa Blue Pearls	4
Arsenal Ladies	2
Al Najma SC	1
Royal University	1
Arsenal Yellow	1
Venus Tekkers	1
Ravens FC	1
Amal Al-Mamlaka	1

== Top goalscorers ==
Season	Player	Team	Goals
2018-19	(Bahrain) Hessa Al-Isa	Blue Pearls	18
