= Iraq women's national futsal team =

Women's national futsal team representing Iraq

Iraq
- Shirt badge/Association crest
- Nickname(s): Libuaat al-Rafidayn (Lionesses of Mesopotamia)
- Association: Iraq Football Association (IFA)
- Confederation: AFC (Asia)
- Head coach: Shahnaz Yari
- Captain: Bahra Mohammed
- Home stadium: Baghdad Gymnasium
- FIFA code: IRQ
- FIFA ranking: 50 (24 September 2026)
Home colours	Away colours	Third colours

First international
- Iraq 3–8 Syria (Amman, Jordan; 28 July 2008)

Biggest win
- Iraq 12–0 Kuwait (Jeddah, Saudi Arabia; 22 June 2022)

Biggest defeat
- Iraq 0–16 Iran (Amman, Jordan; 30 July 2008)

The Iraq women's national futsal team (Arabic: منتخب العراق النسوي لكرة الصالات) represents Iraq in international women's futsal competitions and is controlled by the Iraq Football Association (IFA).

== History ==
=== First achievement – 2022 WAFF Championship triumph ===
In 2022, the Iraq Football Association has committed to provide all means to develop the level of the women's national futsal team. On 8 May 2022, Iranian Shahnaz Yari was appointed as new head coach. The team started a 10-day training camp in Tehran and played several friendly matches. Following the training camp, Shahnaz Yari selected 14 players to compete in the 2022 WAFF Championship in Jeddah. Despite a narrow 1–0 loss to Bahrain in the opening match, Iraq was undeterred and won 7–0 against Palestine. The team maintained its good performance by winning 12–0 against favourites Kuwait. This victory propelled the Iraqi women's futsal team to play the first final in its history. In the final, Iraq beat hosts Saudi Arabia 4–2 to win the first ever women's futsal title. Iraqi striker Shokhan Salihi finished as the tournament's top goalscorer with 7 goals.

== Results and fixtures ==
Legend

Win Draw Lose Fixture

=== Previous matches ===
18 June 2022 2022 WAFF Women's Futsal Championship	Iraq	0–1	Bahrain	King Abdullah Sports Hall, Jeddah, Saudi Arabia
18:00		Report; Line Up	Rawan Al-Ali 36'

20 June 2022 2022 WAFF Women's Futsal Championship	Palestine	0–7	Iraq	King Abdullah Sports Hall, Jeddah, Saudi Arabia
18:00		Report; Line Up	Al-Ghazawi 15', 30', 38'; Salihi 16'; Mulla Bakr 20', 29'; Salih 33'

22 June 2022 2022 WAFF Women's Futsal Championship	Kuwait	0–12	Iraq	King Abdullah Sports Hall, Jeddah, Saudi Arabia
20:30		Report; Line Up	Al-Quraishi 16'; Salih 18', 22'; Mulla Bakr 21'; Salihi 21', 22', 26', 27'; Al-Lami 28', 29'; Al-Ghazawi 30', 32'

24 June 2022 2022 WAFF Women's Futsal Championship	Saudi Arabia	2–4	Iraq	King Abdullah Sports Hall, Jeddah, Saudi Arabia
20:30	Mohammed 10'; AlHamad 35'	Report; Line Up	Salihi 23', 39'; Mulla Bakr 34'; Al-Ghazawi 36'

== Coaching staff ==
=== Current coaching staff ===
As of 19 July 2024

Role	Name
Head coach	(Portugal) Vieira Bettencourt
Assistant Coach	(Portugal) Francesco Micri
Goalkeeper Coach	(Portugal) Felipe Andrade

=== Manager history ===
As of 19 July 2024

Name	Period	Matches	Wins	Draws	Losses	Winning %	Ref.
(Iran) Shahnaz Yari	2022–2024	4	3	0	1	75.00	
(Portugal) Vieira Bettencourt	2024-						

== Players ==
=== Current squad ===
The following players were called up to the 2022 WAFF Women's Futsal Championship.

No.	Pos.	Player	Date of birth (age)	Caps	Club
1	GK	Khalat Al-Zebari	12 August 1996 (age 30)		(Iraq) Al-Zawraa
12	GK	Shajwan Mustafa			(Iraq)
2	FP	Shilan Mhamadamin			(Iraq) Al-Zawraa
3	FP	Bahra Mohammed (captain)	1 February 1993 (age 33)		(Iraq) Naft Al-Shamal
4	FP	Ghufran Mahdi			(Iraq) Al-Quwa Al-Jawiya
5	FP	Tiba Al-Quraishi	13 January 1996 (age 30)		(Iraq) Al-Zawraa
6	FP	Lanya Salih			(Iraq) Naft Al-Shamal
7	FP	Direen Mulla Bakr	13 January 2000 (age 26)		(Iraq) Naft Al-Shamal
8	FP	Samira Salih			(Iraq) Al-Zawraa
9	FP	Zainab Al-Lami	22 December 1996 (age 29)		(Iraq) Al-Quwa Al-Jawiya
10	FP	Shokhan Salihi			(Iraq) Al-Zawraa
11	FP	Berivan Rashid			(Iraq) Al-Zawraa
13	FP	Tabarek Al-Ghazawi			(Iraq) Naft Al-Shamal
14	FP	Huda Jawdhari			(Iraq)

=== Previous squads ===
WAFF Women's Futsal Championship

== Competitive record ==
*Draws include knockout matches decided on penalty kicks.
**Gold background colour indicates that the tournament was won.
***Red border colour indicates tournament was held on home soil.

Champions Runners-up Third Place Fourth place

=== FIFA Futsal Women's World Cup ===
FIFA Futsal Women's World Cup record
Year	Round	Position	GP	W	D	L	GS	GA
(Philippines) 2025	Did not qualify							
Total	–	0/1	0	0	0	0	0	0

=== AFC Women's Futsal Asian Cup ===
AFC Women's Futsal Asian Cup Record
Year	Round	Pld	W	D	L	GS	GA	Dif	Pts
(Malaysia) 2015	Did not enter								
(Thailand) 2018	Did not enter								
(Kuwait) 2020	Cancelled due to the COVID-19 pandemic								
(China) 2025	Did not qualify								
Total	0/2	—	—	—	—	—	—	—	—

=== Asian Indoor and Martial Arts Games ===
Asian Indoor and Martial Arts Games Record
Year	Round	Pld	W	D	L	GS	GA	Dif	Pts
(Thailand) 2005	Did not enter								
(Macau) 2007	Did not enter								
(Vietnam) 2009	Did not enter								
(South Korea) 2013	Did not enter								
(Turkmenistan) 2017	Did not enter								
(Thailand) 2023	To be determined								
(Saudi Arabia) 2025	To be determined								
Total	0/5	—	—	—	—	—	—	—	—

=== West Asian Championship ===
West Asian Championship Record
Year	Round	Pld	W	D	L	GS	GA	Dif	Pts
(Jordan) 2008	Group stage	3	0	0	3	3	31	−28	0
(Bahrain) 2012	Group stage	2	0	0	2	2	21	−19	0
(Saudi Arabia) 2022	Champions	4	3	0	1	23	3	+20	9
Total	3/3	9	3	0	6	28	55	−27	0

== Head-to-head record ==
The following table shows Iraq's women's national futsal team all-time international record, correct as of 24 June 2022 (vs. Saudi Arabia).

Team	Confederation	First	GP	W	D	L	GF	GA	GD
Bahrain	AFC	2012	2	0	0	2	2	9	−7
Iran	AFC	2008	2	0	0	2	0	29	−29
Kuwait	AFC	2022	1	1	0	0	12	0	+12
Lebanon	AFC	2008	1	0	0	1	0	7	−7
Palestine	AFC	2022	1	1	0	0	7	0	+7
Saudi Arabia	AFC	2022	1	1	0	0	4	2	+2
Syria	AFC	2008	1	0	0	1	3	8	−5
Total			9	3	0	6	28	55	−27

== Honours ==
=== Titles ===
Regional competitions

- WAFF Women's Futsal Championship
  - Champions: 2022

== See also ==
- Sport in Iraq
- Women's sport in Iraq
- Iraq national futsal team, the men's team
