= Mato Stanković =

Croatian futsal player and coach

Personal information
- Date of birth: September 28, 1970 (age 56)
- Place of birth: Dubrovnik, SFR Yugoslavia

Team information
- Current team: Saudi Arabia women's futsal (manager)

Senior career*
Years	Team	Apps	(Gls)
1987–1988	Konavljanin		
1989–1991	Jadran-Supetar		
1988–1989	Dalma-Aquarius (futsal)		
1996–2000	MNK Split 1700 (futsal)		

Managerial career
- 2000–2005: Split Gašperov (futsal)
- 2005–2007: Brodosplit Inženjering (futsal)
- 2007–2008: Libya (futsal)
- 2010-2021: Croatia (futsal)
- 2021-: Saudi Arabia women (futsal)
- * Club domestic league appearances and goals

Mato Stanković (born 28 September 1970 in Dubrovnik, SFR Yugoslavia) is a Croatian futsal coach and former player. He is current coach of the Saudi Arabia women's national futsal team.

== Futsal managerial career ==
Stanković managed MNK Split to the 2001–02 UEFA Futsal Cup semi-finals and had a successful spell with Libya.

He replaced Mica Martić as manager of the Croatia national futsal team in August 2010, with Martić being the one to replace Stanković in 2003.

== Honors ==
=== As a player ===
- 1990-1995 Dalma Split (1. CFNL)
- 1995-2000 Split 1700 (1. CFNL)
- Croatian champion 1996/1997
- University futsal world championship, Finland, 1996

=== As a coach ===
- Croatian Champion:
  - 2000/01 with MNK Split 1700, 2001/02, 2002/03, 2003/04 with Split Gasperov & 2005/06 with Brodosplit Inzenjering
- Croatian Cup:
  - 2000/2001 with MNK Split 1700, 2001/02, 2002/03, 2004/05 with Split Gasperov & 2005/06 with Brodosplit Inzenjering
- African Futsal Championship:
  - 2008 with Libya
- Arab Futsal Championship:
  - 2007, 2008 with Libya
- UEFA Futsal Champions league 3rd place 2001/2002, Mnk Split Gašperov
- UEFA Futsal Champions league 1/4 finale 2002/2003, Mnk Split Gašperov
- UEFA Futsal Champions league 1/4 finale 2003/2004, Mnk Split Gašperov
- UEFA Futsal Champions league 1/8 finale 2005/2006, Mnk Brodosplit inž.
- Assistant coach of Croatian national team 2002–2004
- Coach of Libyan national team 2007–2009
- Winner of African futsal championship (CAF), Tripoli, Libya, 2008
- Winner of Arab futsal championship, Port Said, Egypt, 2009
- Winner of North African futsal championship Tunisia, 2009
- Placement and participation in the WORLD CUP, Brasil, 2008
- Coach of Croatian national team 2010–2012
- Winner of Mediterranean cup in Libya 2010
- EURO 2012 (European championship in futsal) in Croatia, SEMI-FINALS
