= Marianna Tabain =

Australian soccer player (born 1992)

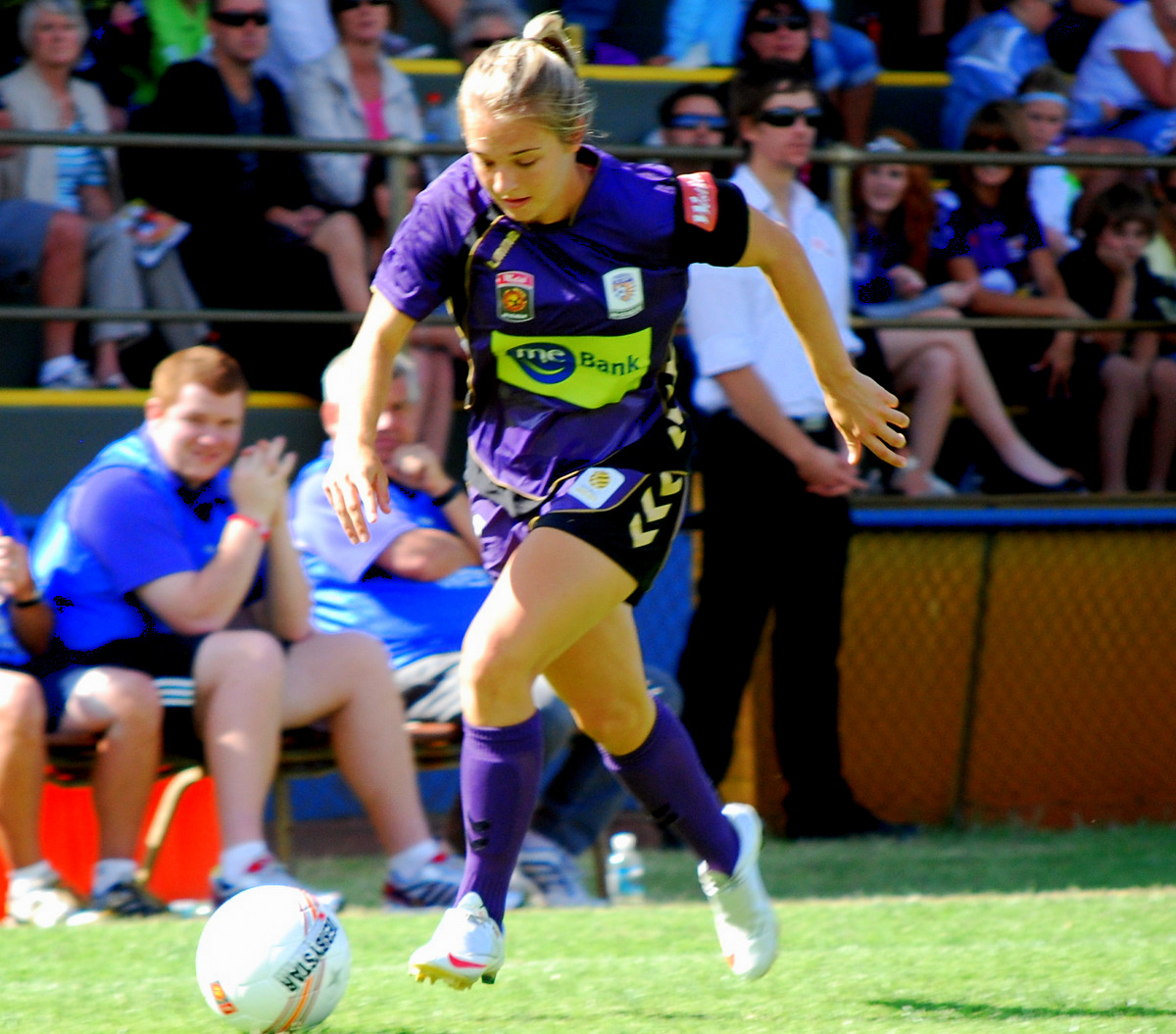
- Tabain playing for Perth Glory in 2010

Personal information
- Full name: Marianna Tabain
- Date of birth: 19 October 1992 (age 34)
- Place of birth: Sydney, Australia
- Height: 1.68 m (5 ft 6 in)
- Positions: Right winger; striker

Team information
- Current team: Cockburn Wolves
- Number: 10

Youth career
- FW NTC

Senior career*
Years	Team	Apps	(Gls)
2008–2015	Perth Glory	63	(17)
2015–2017	Melbourne City	27	(10)
2017–2018	Perth Glory	12	(0)
2019–2020	Split		
2020–2021	Perth Glory	12	(0)

International career
2008	Australia U17		
- Australia U20
2025–	Australia (futsal)	2	(2)
- * Club domestic league appearances and goals

Marianna Tabain (born 19 October 1992) is an Australian professional soccer and futsal player.

== Personal life ==
Tabain was born in Sydney, New South Wales. Tabain's family derives from the island of Korčula, Croatia.

== Club career ==
=== Cockburn City ===
Tabain started her junior playing career at Cockburn City in Spearwood.

=== Western Knights ===
In 2005, Tabain moved from Cockburn City to play for Croatian club Western Knights, in Mosman Park. After a few seasons at Western Knights, Tabain was identified to be a part of the Football West National Training Centre, the Western Australian State Team and the Western Australian Institute of Sport program before moving to Perth Glory.

=== Perth Glory, 2008–2014 ===
Tabain debuted for Perth Glory at the age of 15 in the inaugural season of the Australian Westfield W-League. Tabain won the 2009 W-League Goal of the Year Award for a goal in Round 9 against Adelaide United.

On the 15th of November 2014, Perth Glory became Minor Premiers at Ashfield Reserve. Tabain spent eight seasons at Perth Glory before moving to play for Melbourne City. During her time at Perth, Tabain was nominated for W-League Goal of the Year Award on numerous occasions. Tabain also took out the Golden Boot award for Perth in 2009.

=== Melbourne City, 2015–2017 ===
Marianna Tabain represented Melbourne City in The Australian Westfield W-League. Founded in 2015, the club became W-League Premiers in 2015–16 and W-League Champions in 2015–16 and 2016–17. Tabain played an integral part in the teams immediate success. During her second season at Melbourne City, Tabain made her 100th W-League appearance against Melbourne Victory at Epping Stadium on 15 January 2017. She was the second player in the W-League to reach the 100 game milestone.

=== Return to Perth Glory ===
In August 2017, Tabain returned to Perth Glory.

=== ŽNK Split ===
Tabain played for Croatian League and Cup Champions ŽNK Split, and represented the club in the UEFA Women's Champions League qualifiers in Ukraine in August 2019.

=== Second return to Perth Glory ===
In December 2020, Tabain returned to the Australian W-League, signing once again with Perth Glory. Tabain departed Perth Glory ahead of the 2021–22 A-League Women season.

=== International career ===
Tabain has represented The Australian National team at U/17 and U/20 level in Europe and Asia.

== International goals ==
=== Futsal ===
No.	Date	Venue	Opponent	Score	Result	Competition
1.	11 January 2025	Tashkent, Uzbekistan	Turkmenistan	4–1	6–1	2025 AFC Women's Futsal Asian Cup qualification
2.	13 January 2025	Tashkent, Uzbekistan	Kuwait	4–0	5–0	2025 AFC Women's Futsal Asian Cup qualification

== Honours and awards ==
Perth Glory

- W-League Premiership: 2014

Melbourne City

- W-League Premiership: 2015–16
- W-League Championship: 2016, 2017, 2018

Individual

- PFA W-League Team of the Decade: 2010–2019
- W-League Goal of the Year: 2009
