= Asrar Al-Shaibani =

Saudi footballer (born 1995)

Personal information
- Full name: Asrar Jamal Abdulaziz Mohammed Al-Shaibani
- Date of birth: 23 July 1995 (age 31)
- Place of birth: Saudi Arabia
- Position: Winger

Team information
- Current team: Al-Ula
- Number: 30

Senior career*
Years	Team	Apps	(Gls)
2015–2019	Kings United		
2019–2022	Jeddah Eagles		
2022–2025	Al-Ittihad	14	(1)
2025-	Al-Ula		

International career
2021–	Saudi Arabia Futsal		
2022–	Saudi Arabia		
- * Club domestic league appearances and goals

Asrar Jamal Abdulaziz Mohammed Al-Shaibani (Arabic: أَسْرَار جَمَال عَبْد الْعَزِيز مُحَمَّد الشَّيْبَانِيّ; born 23 July 1995) is a Saudi footballer who plays as a winger for Saudi Women's Premier League side Al-Ula.

== Club career ==
Al-Shaibani started playing with Kings United in 2015 and she moved to Jeddah Eagles in 2019.

Since Al-Ittihad acquired Jeddah Eagles in 2022, Al-Shaibani played as a striker in the 2022/23 Saudi Women's Premier League, scoring a goal against Al-Ahli in the Jeddah Derby on 15 October 2022.

Al-Shaibani continued to score goals in the following season 2023/24 with American coach Kelly Lindsey.

== International career ==
Al-Shaibani played for the first time at an international level in 2021 while representing the Saudi Arabia women's national futsal team.

In February 2022, Al-Shaibani was named as part of the first-ever Saudi Arabia women's national football team for the two friendlies against Seychelles and Maldives. She was able to play her first international match by participating in the second half against Seychelles on 20 February 2022.
