= Tsou Hsin-ni =

Taiwanese footballer

Personal information
- Date of birth: 11 January 1995 (age 31)
- Position: Midfielder

International career^{‡}
Years	Team	Apps	(Gls)
2016–2017	Chinese Taipei	3	(0)
- ‡ National team caps and goals as of 7 April 2017.

Tsou Hsin-ni (Chinese: 鄒欣妮; born 11 January 1995) is a Taiwanese footballer who plays as a midfielder. She has been a member of the Chinese Taipei women's national team.

== International career ==
Tsou Hsin-ni capped for Chinese Taipei at senior level during the 2017 EAFF E-1 Football Championship and the 2018 AFC Women's Asian Cup qualification.
