= Maha Janoud =

Syrian football manager

Maha Janoud (Arabic: مها جنود) is a Syrian football manager.

== Early life ==
Janoud started playing football at a young age.

== Education ==
Janoud attended the Syria Institute of Sports and Psychological Counseling.

== Playing career ==
Janoud helped the Syria women's national football team achieve third place at the 2005 WAFF Women's Championship.

== Managerial career ==
Janoud became a manager after suffering an injury. She has worked as a member of the AFC Women's Football Committee. She also has worked as head of women's football of Oman.

== Personal life ==
Janoud obtained an AFC A coaching license.
