= Leen Mohammed =

Saudi footballer (born 2000)

Personal information
- Full name: Leen Mohammed Al-Blehid
- Date of birth: 22 March 2000 (age 26)
- Place of birth: Saudi Arabia
- Position: Defender

Team information
- Current team: Al-Shabab
- Number: 3

Senior career*
| Years | Team | Apps | (Gls) |
| 2018–2023 | Al Yamamah | 27 | (2) |
| 2023– | Al-Shabab | 12 | (1) |

International career^{‡}
| 2019– | Saudi Arabia Futsal | 16 | (3) |
| 2022– | Saudi Arabia | 13 | (1) |
- * Club domestic league appearances and goals as of 30 December 2023 ‡ National team caps and goals as of 12 January 2024

Leen Mohammed Al-Blehid (Arabic: لِين مُحَمَّد الْبُلَيْهِد; born 22 March 2000) is a Saudi professional footballer who plays as a defender for Saudi Women's Premier League club Al-Shabab and the Saudi Arabia women's national team.

== Club career ==
Leen played for Al Yamamah since 2018. on 29 November She scored her first goal for the club against Sama. She was part of Al Yamamah squad that finished third in the first-ever SAFF Women's National Football Championship.

After Al-Shabab acquired Al Yamamah FC, Leen subsequently joined Al-Shabab. On 14 October 2023, she debuted for Al-Shabab in a 1–0 win over Al-Ahli. She scored her first goal with the club on 16 November 2023, in a 9–2 win over Al-Riyadh.

== International career ==
Starting in 2019. Leen represented the Saudi's futsal team at several events, she played the 2022 WAFF Women's Futsal Championship, the first time the team participated in a WAFF Women's Futsal Championship. Leen scored in the final, opening the score in the 11th minute before Iraq came back and won the title.

In February 2022, Leen was included in the squad list of the first Saudi Arabia women's national team that were scheduled to play Seychelles and the Maldives. On 20 February, Leen started in the Senior team's debut match against Seychelles, a 2–0 win. On 11 May 2023, she scored her first goal for the team, opening the score in the 18th minute.

== Career statistics ==
=== Club ===
As of match played 30 December 2023

Appearances and goals by club, season and competition
| Club | Season | League | | | Cup | | Continental | | Other | | Total | |
| Club | Season | Division | Apps | Goals | Apps | Goals | Apps | Goals | Apps | Goals | Apps | Goals |
|---|---|---|---|---|---|---|---|---|---|---|---|---|
| Al Yamamah | 2023–24 | SWPL | 14 | 0 | — | | — | | — | | 14 | 0 |
| Al Yamamah | Total | | 14 | 0 | — | | — | | — | | 14 | 0 |
| Al-Shabab | 2023–24 | SWPL | 7 | 1 | 2 | 0 | — | | 3 | 0 | 12 | 1 |
| Al-Shabab | Total | | 7 | 1 | 2 | 0 | — | | 3 | 0 | 12 | 1 |
| Career total | | | 21 | 1 | 2 | 0 | — | | 3 | 0 | 26 | 1 |

=== International ===
As of match played 19 February 2024

Appearances and goals by national team and year
| National team | Year | Apps | Goals |
|---|---|---|---|
| Saudi Arabia | 2022 | 4 | 0 |
| Saudi Arabia | 2023 | 8 | 1 |
| Saudi Arabia | 2024 | 2 | 1 |
| Total | | 14 | 2 |

==== International goals ====
| No. | Date | Venue | Opponent | Score | Result | Competition |
|---|---|---|---|---|---|---|
| 1. | 11 May 2023 | Prince Abdullah Al Faisal Stadium, Jeddah, Saudi Arabia | Palestine | 1–0 | 1–1 | International Friendly |
| 2. | 19 February 2024 | King Abdullah Sports City Reserve Stadium, Jeddah, Saudi Arabia | Jordan | 1–1 | 1–3 | 2024 WAFF Women's Championship |

== Honours ==
Saudi Arabia

- SAFF Women's International Friendly Tournament winner: Khobar 2023

Saudi Arabia futsal

- WAFF Women's Futsal Championship runners-up: 2022
