= Shokhan Salihi =

Iraqi footballer (born 2000)

Shokhan Nooraldin
Personal information
- Full name: Shokhan Nooraldin Sadraldin Salihi
- Date of birth: 10 April 2000 (age 26)
- Place of birth: Kirkuk, Iraq
- Position: Forward

Team information
- Current team: Neom

Senior career*
| Years | Team | Apps | (Gls) |
- Erbil SC
| –2022 | Ghaz Al-Shamal | | |
| 2022–2025 | Al Hilal | 46 | (61) |
| 2026 | Al Etihad | 0 | (0) |
| 2026 | Neom | 2 | (3) |

International career^{‡}
| 2022– | Iraq Futsal | 4 | (7) |
| 2024– | Iraq | 6 | (2) |
Medal record
Women's futsal
Representing Iraq
WAFF Women's Futsal Championship
| Winner | 2022 Saudi Arabia |
- * Club domestic league appearances and goals ‡ National team caps and goals as of 20 April 2026

Shokhan Nooraldin Sadraldin Salihi (Arabic: شوخان نور الدين صدر الدين صالحي; born 10 April 2000) is an Iraqi footballer, futsal player and a handball player who plays as a forward for Saudi Arabian club Neom, Iraq women's national football team, Iraq women's national futsal team and Iraq women's national handball team.

In November 2022, Salihi broke the record of most goals in any top-flight match after scoring 15 goals in the match of Al-Hilal against Sama in the 2022–23 Saudi Women's Premier League.

== Early life ==
Shokhan Nooraldin was born in Kirkuk to an Iraqi Kurdish family.

== Club career ==
=== Erbil SC ===
Salihi who also played handball, represented Erbil SC. winning with the club two consecutive seasons of the Iraqi women's handball league. She also participated in two editions of the Women's Arab Club Championship, namely in Jordan 2019 and Tunisia 2021. In the 2019 tournament, she finished as the top scorer of the 2019 Arab Handball Women's Championship of Champions hosted in Amman.

=== Ghaz Al-Shamal SC ===
Shokhan began her futsal journey with Ghaz Al-Shamal SC Women's Club in the Iraqi Futsal League. Her remarkable achievements in the league included clinching the title of the top scorer in the Premier Futsal League.

=== Al Hilal SFC ===
As Al Hilal acquired the Challenge Women's Football Club in order to participate in the 2022–23 Saudi Women's Premier League, they signed Shokhan after the performance she showed in the 2022 WAFF Women's Futsal Championship.

Nooraldin signed a new contract with Al Hilal in the summer of 2023 that would keep her at the club until 2026. She finished her first season as the league's top scores with 44 goals in total.

== International career ==
Shokhan was first capped for Iraq women's national futsal team in the 2022 WAFF Women's Futsal Championship hosted in Saudi Arabia.

In February 2024, Shokhan got its first call-up to the Iraq women's national football team for a friendly match as part of the preparations for the 2024 WAFF Women's Championship. On 11 February 2024, she made her debut for the senior team in a match against the United Arab Emirates. Shokhan was later included on the final squad for the championship.

== International goals ==
| No. | Date | Venue | Opponent | Score | Result | Competition |
|---|---|---|---|---|---|---|
| 1. | 26 November 2025 | Hall Stadium – King Abdullah Sports City, Jeddah, Saudi Arabia | United Arab Emirates | 2–0 | 3–0 | 2025 WAFF Women's Championship |
| 2. | 2 December 2025 | Prince Abdullah Al-Faisal Sports City Stadium, Jeddah, Saudi Arabia | Saudi Arabia | 1–1 | 2–2 (4–2 p) | 2025 WAFF Women's Championship |

== Career statistics ==
=== Club ===
Appearances and goals by club, season and competition
| Club | Season | League | | | Cup | | Continental | | Other | | Total | |
| Club | Season | Division | Apps | Goals | Apps | Goals | Apps | Goals | Apps | Goals | Apps | Goals |
|---|---|---|---|---|---|---|---|---|---|---|---|---|
| Al Hilal | 2022–23 | Saudi Women's Premier League | 14 | 44 | – | – | – | – | — | | 14 | 44 |
| Al Hilal | 2023–24 | Saudi Women's Premier League | 14 | 11 | 2 | 1 | – | – | 3 | 2 | 19 | 14 |
| Al Hilal | 2024–25 | Saudi Women's Premier League | 18 | 6 | 2 | 2 | – | – | — | | 20 | 8 |
| Al Etihad | 2026-27 | Jordan Women's Pro League | | | | | 3 | 3 | | | 3 | 3 |
| Neom | 2026-27 | Saudi Women's Premier League | 2 | 3 | | | | | | | 2 | 3 |
| Career total | | | 48 | 64 | 4 | 3 | 3 | 3 | 3 | 2 | 58 | 72 |

== Honours ==
=== Iraq (Futsal) ===
- WAFF Women's Futsal Championship:

Champions: 2022

=== Al Hilal ===
- Saudi Women's Premier League:

Runners-up: 2022-23

=== Individual ===
==== Football ====
- Saudi Women's Premier League Top scorer: 2022–23
- WAFF Women's Futsal Championship Top scorer: 2022

==== Handball ====
- Arab Handball Women's Championship of Champions Top scorer: 2019
