= 2022 WAFF Women's Futsal Championship =

بطولة اتحاد غرب آسيا الثالثة لكرة الصالات للسيدات

Tournament details
- Host country: Saudi Arabia
- City: Jeddah
- Dates: 15–24 June
- Teams: 6 (from 1 sub-confederation)
- Venue: 1 (in 1 host city)

Final positions
- Champions: Iraq (1st title)
- Runners-up: Saudi Arabia
- Third place: Bahrain
- Fourth place: Kuwait

Tournament statistics
- Matches played: 11
- Goals scored: 58 (5.27 per match)
- Top scorer(s): (Iraq) Shokhan Salihi (7 goals)
- Best player: (Saudi Arabia) Seba Tawfiq
- Best goalkeeper: (Bahrain) Zahra Ali

The 2022 WAFF Women's Futsal Championship was the third edition of the WAFF Women's Futsal Championship, an international women's futsal Championship organised by the West Asian Football Federation (WAFF) for the women's national teams of West Asia. It was hosted by the Kingdom of Saudi Arabia for the first time and marked the country's first-ever women's international tournament, held from June 15 to 24, 2022.

Iran the two-time defending champions, would have been the defending champions. However, they have since left WAFF to join CAFA. Iraq won their first title after defeating host Saudi Arabia in the final 4–2, thus becoming the first Arab national team to win the title.

== Participation ==
=== Participating teams ===
Initially, seven (out of 12) WAFF member associations entered teams for the final tournament in Jeddah. However, the United Arab Emirates withdrew after the draw.

Team	App.	Previous best performance
Bahrain	2nd	Third Place (2012)
Iraq	3rd	Group Stage (2008, 2012)
Kuwait	2nd	Group Stage (2008)
Oman	1st	Debut
Palestine	3rd	Fourth Place (2008)
Saudi Arabia	1st	Debut
~~United Arab Emirates~~	~~1st~~	~~Debut~~

Did not enter

- Jordan
- Lebanon
- Qatar
- Syria
- Yemen

=== Draw ===
The draw took place virtually on 25 May 2022, and was streamed on the West Asian Football Federation's YouTube channel.

The draw resulted in the following groups:

Group A
Pos	Team
A1	Palestine
A2	Iraq
A3	Bahrain
A4	~~United Arab Emirates~~

Group B
Pos	Team
B1	Saudi Arabia
B2	Oman
B3	Kuwait

== Group stage ==
All times are local, SAST (UTC+3). The original schedule was announced following the draw.

=== Group A ===
Pos	Team	Pld	W	D	L	GF	GA	GD	Pts	Qualification
1	Bahrain	2	2	0	0	7	0	+7	6	Knockout stage
2	Iraq	2	1	0	1	7	1	+6	3	Knockout stage
3	Palestine	2	0	0	2	0	13	−13	0	Fifth place match

Source: WAFF
Rules for classification: Group stage tiebreakers
16 June 2022
17:30

Bahrain	6–0	Palestine
Al-Khalifa 15:29, 18:06; Al-Isa 19:20, 27:27, 36:19; Ebrahim 28:48	Report; Line Up

King Abdullah Sports City, Jeddah
Referee: Yasir Al-Zaabi (United Arab Emirates)
Najat Al-Blooshi (United Arab Emirates)
Rafid Salman Lami (Iraq)

18 June 2022
18:00

Iraq	0–1	Bahrain
	Report; Line Up	Al-Ali 36:14

King Abdullah Sports City, Jeddah
Referee: Mohammed Al-Boloushi (Kuwait)
Maryam Al Hadhrami (Oman)
Samar Al-Inezi (Kuwait)

20 June 2022
18:00

Palestine	0–7	Iraq
	Report; Line Up	Al-Ghazawi 15:46, 30:34, 38:33; Salihi 16:01 (pen.); Mulla Bakr 20:12, 29:45; Salih 33:24

King Abdullah Sports City, Jeddah
Referee: Reem Shami (Lebanon)
Aisha Al Saadi (Oman)

=== Group B ===
Pos	Team	Pld	W	D	L	GF	GA	GD	Pts	Qualification
1	Kuwait	2	2	0	0	9	2	+7	6	Knockout stage
2	Saudi Arabia (H)	2	1	0	1	6	3	+3	3	Knockout stage
3	Oman	2	0	0	2	1	11	−10	0	Fifth place match

Source: WAFF
Rules for classification: Group stage tiebreakers
(H) Hosts
16 June 2022
20:30

Kuwait	3–1	Saudi Arabia
Al-Mulla 4:17, 24:23; M. Nour 20:00	Report; Line Up	Reda 37:22

King Abdullah Sports City, Jeddah
Referee: Reem Shami (Lebanon)

18 June 2022
20:30

Oman	1–6	Kuwait
Al Musallami 10:10	Report; Line Up	Basha 07:10, 15:31, 17:25; Al-Refaie 23:34, 32:22; Al-Saqabi 30:26

King Abdullah Sports City, Jeddah

20 June 2022
20:30

Saudi Arabia	5–0	Oman
Mohammed 3:07; Mukhayzin 5:58, 6:32; Reda 19:23 (pen.), 21:58 (pen.)	Report; Line Up

King Abdullah Sports City, Jeddah

== Placement matches ==
=== Fifth place match ===
22 June 2022
15:30

Oman	1–6	Palestine
Al Ismaily 32:40	Report; Line Up	C. Khoury 14:39; Shattara 27:26; Sohgian 32:04; Al-Shaikh 37:07; Sarawi 38:15; A. Khoury 39:50

King Abdullah Sports City, Jeddah

== Knockout stage ==
Semi-finals
22 June - Jeddah
Bahrain	0
Saudi Arabia (a.e.t.)	1
22 June - Jeddah
Kuwait	0
Iraq	12

Final
24 June - Jeddah
Saudi Arabia	2
Iraq	4
Third Place
24 June - Jeddah
Bahrain	2
Kuwait	0

=== Semi-finals ===
22 June 2022
18:00

Bahrain	0–1 (a.e.t.)	Saudi Arabia
	Report; Line Up	Mobarak 42:25

King Abdullah Sports City
22 June 2022
20:30

Kuwait	0–12	Iraq
	Report; Line Up	Al-Quraishi 16:52; Salih 18:52, 22:15; Mulla Bakr 21:01; Salihi 21:39, 22:28, 26:06, 27:38; Al-Lami 28:26, 29:21; Al-Ghazawi 30:15, 32:34

King Abdullah Sports City

=== Third place match ===
24 June 2022
18:15

Bahrain	2–0	Kuwait
Al-Khalifa 26:08; Ebrahim 30:05	Report; Line Up

King Abdullah Sports City

=== Final ===
24 June 2022
20:30

Saudi Arabia	2–4	Iraq
Mohammed 10:35; Al-Ghazawi 35:12 (o.g.)	Report; Line Up	Salihi 23:13, 39:16; Mulla Bakr 34:03; Al-Ghazawi 36:27

King Abdullah Sports City

== Champion ==
2022 WAFF Women's Futsal Championship champion

Iraq
First title

== Player awards ==
The following awards were given at the conclusion of the tournament:

Top Goalscorer	Best player	Best Goalkeeper
(Iraq) Shokhan Salihi	(Saudi Arabia) Seba Tawfiq	(Bahrain) Zahra Ali

== Goalscorers ==
There were 58 goals scored in 11 matches, for an average of 5.27 goals per match.

7 goals

- (Iraq) Shokhan Salihi

6 goals

- (Iraq) Tbarek Al-Ghazawi

4 goals

- (Iraq) Direen Mulla Bakr
- (Saudi Arabia) Lana Reda

3 goals

- (Bahrain) Hessa Al-Isa
- (Bahrain) Al-Anood Al-Khalifa
- (Iraq) Lanya Salih
- (Kuwait) Shrouq Basha

2 goals

- (Bahrain) Manar Ebrahim
- (Iraq) Zainab Al-Lami
- (Kuwait) Reem Al-Mulla
- (Saudi Arabia) Raghad Mukhayzin
- (Saudi Arabia) Leen Mohammed

1 goal

- (Bahrain) Rawan Al-Ali
- (Iraq) Tiba Al-Quraishi
- (Kuwait) Maryam Nour
- (Kuwait) Abeer Al-Refaie
- (Kuwait) Nehal Al-Saqabi
- (Oman) Layinat Al Musallami
- (Oman) Thara Al Ismaily
- (Palestine) Celine Thalia Khoury
- (Palestine) Jeniver Shattara
- (Palestine) Caroline Sohgian
- (Palestine) Laila Al-Shaikh
- (Palestine) Hala Sarawi
- (Palestine) Aline Rita Khoury
- (Saudi Arabia) Al Bandari Mobarak
- (Saudi Arabia) Sara Al-Hamad

== Final ranking ==
As per statistical convention in futsal, matches decided in extra time are counted as wins and losses, while matches decided by penalty shoot-outs are counted as draws.

Pos	Team	Pld	W	D	L	GF	GA	GD	Pts	Final result
1	Iraq	4	3	0	1	23	3	+20	9	Champions
2	Saudi Arabia	4	2	0	2	9	7	+2	6	Runners-up
3	Bahrain	4	3	0	1	9	1	+8	9	Third place
4	Kuwait	4	2	0	2	9	16	−7	6	Fourth place
5	Palestine	3	1	0	2	6	14	−8	3	Fifth place
6	Oman	3	0	0	3	2	17	−15	0	Sixth place

Source: WAFF
