= Qurain, Kuwait =

Area in Kuwait

Coordinates: 29.1966°N 48.0706°E

Qurain City (Arabic: منطقة القرين) is an area in Mubarak Al-Kabeer Governorate, Kuwait. The name means "elevated land" and is an old name for Kuwait itself.

== History ==
=== Significance during the Iraqi invasion of Kuwait ===
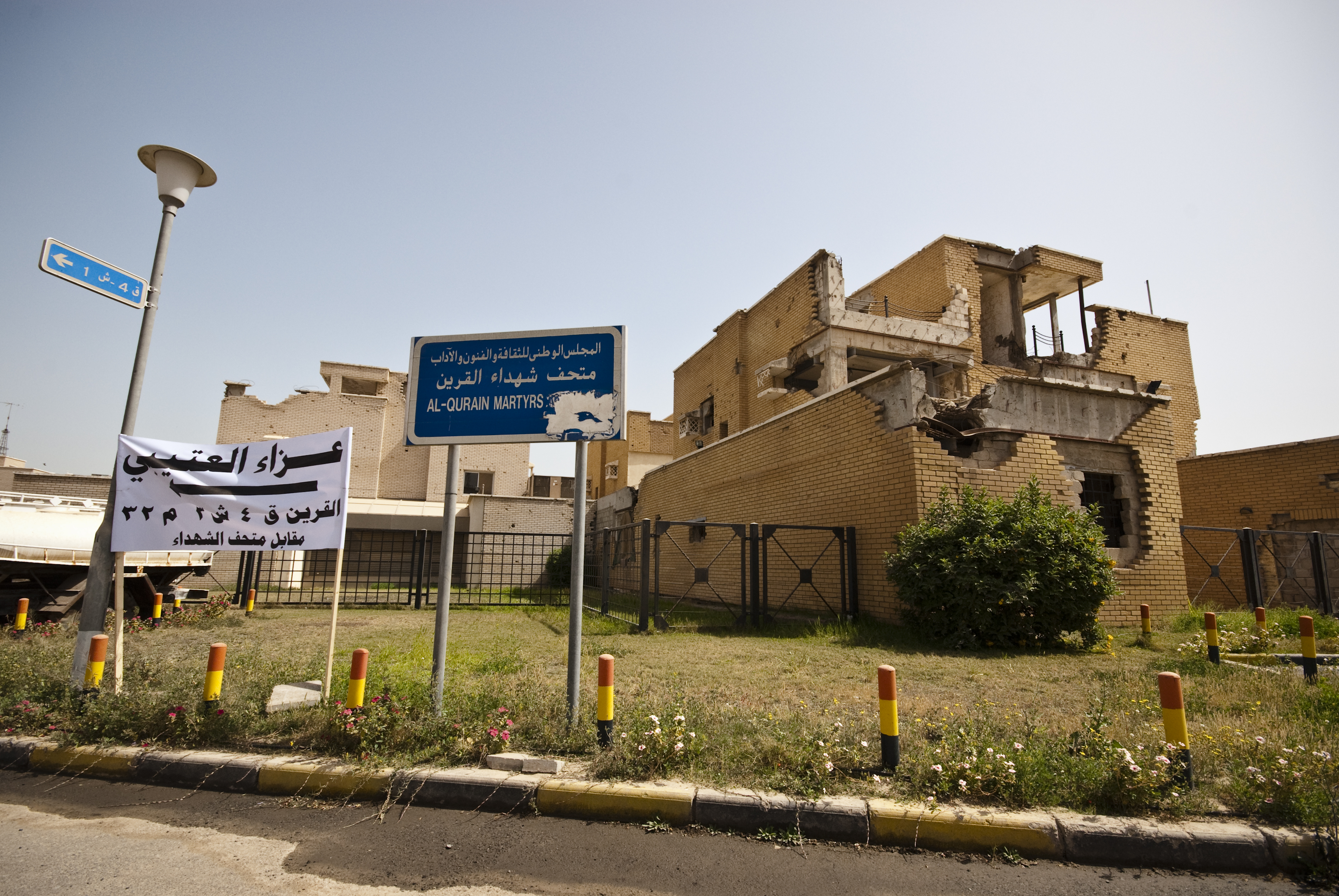
The Al-Qurain Martyrs' Museum, photographed in 2010

The suburb is renowned for three neighboring villas of historical significance. They are what make up Al-Qurain Martyrs' Museum.

On February 24, 1991, 19 members of the "Al-Messilah" resistance group gathered in a house in Qurain preparing operations invading against Iraqi forces. When an Iraqi patrol attempted to enter, a resistance fighter shot a soldier dead. Iraqi forces returned with tanks and armored vehicles, surrounding the house.

A ten-hour battle ensued between the lightly armed resistance fighters and heavily armed Iraqi forces. twelve of the 19 fighters were killed; seven survived by hiding under rubble.

=== Al-Qurain Martyrs' Museum ===
The late Amir Sheikh Jaber Al-Ahmad Al-Sabah decreed the site be converted into a museum, which opened in 2003. The museum consists of three houses: one for administration, the house of martyr Bader Al-Aidan, and a third housing a cinema, library, and document archive.
