= Palestine women's national futsal team =

Women's national futsal team representing State of Palestine

Palestine
- Nickname(s): فدائيات الصالات (The Futsal Fedayaat)
- Association: Palestinian Football Association (الاتحاد الفلسطيني لكرة القدم)
- Confederation: AFC (Asia)
- Head coach: Ahmed Hammad
- Captain: Sireen Ghattas
- FIFA code: PLE
- FIFA ranking: 31 ▼1 (8 May 2026)
- Highest FIFA ranking: 34 (May–October 2024)
- Lowest FIFA ranking: 34 (May–October 2024)
Home colours	Away colours

First international
- Jordan 16–3 Palestine (Jordan; 28 July 2008)

Biggest win
- Palestine 11–0 Kuwait (Jordan; 30 July 2008)

Biggest defeat
- Palestine 1–16 Iran (Ashgabat, Turkmenistan; 16 September 2017); Thailand 16–1 Palestine (Ashgabat, Turkmenistan; 17 September 2017)

WAFF Women's Futsal Championship
- Appearances: 3 (First in 2008)
- Best result: Fourth place (2008)

The Palestine women's national futsal team (Arabic: المنتخب الفلسطيني الوطني لكرة الصالات للسيدات) represents the State of Palestine in international women's futsal competitions. Nicknamed "the Fedayaat", the team is controlled by the Palestinian Football Association (PFA).

== History ==
Palestine was one of the seven nations that participated in the inaugural 2008 WAFF Women's Futsal Championship, the first competitive women's futsal tournament in the region. Their first match was a 3–16 loss to host Jordan. They finished fourth, their best finish to date.

With neither a continental nor a world championship organized until 2015 and 2025 respectively, the Fedayaat took part in all three editions of the WAFF Women's Futsal Championship. In 2017, they made their debut at the Asian Indoor and Martial Arts Games, becoming only the second Arab nation to participate in the event.

In 2024, Palestine took part in the qualifying campaign for the 2025 AFC Women's Futsal Asian Cup, their first attempt to qualify for the tournament.

== Players ==
=== Current squad ===
The following 13 players were called up to the squad for the 2025 AFC Women's Futsal Asian Cup qualification held in Bangkok, Thailand.

No.	Pos.	Player	Date of birth (age)	Club
1	GK	Miraf Marouf	14 January 2006 (age 20)	
2	FP	Rand Halawani		
3	FP	Dima Al Rumhi	23 November 2001 (age 24)	Boatot Tamra
4	FP	Sireen Ghattas	29 May 2001 (age 25)	(Egyptian Football Association) Pyramids
5	FP	Sara Al-Shakhshir	26 April 2004 (age 22)	(Palestinian Football Association) Serreyyeh
7	FP	Jeniver Shattara	9 May 2003 (age 23)	
8	FP	Aya Abed	5 January 1999 (age 27)	
9	FP	Naomi Phillips	3 February 2007 (age 19)	(United States Soccer Federation) Dayton Flyers
10	FP	Laila Al-Shaikh	20 March 2001 (age 25)	
11	FP	Hala Sarawi	14 February 2003 (age 23)	(Egyptian Football Association) Pyramids
12	FP	Nour Youssef	18 July 2005 (age 21)	(German Football Association) Viktoria Berlin
13	GK	Sharlot Phillips	24 June 2005 (age 21)	(Canadian Soccer Association) York Lions
14	FP	Narin Abu Asfar	12 January 2008 (age 18)	(Swedish Football Association)

== Competitive record ==
=== FIFA Futsal Women's World Cup ===
FIFA Futsal Women's World Cup record										Qualification record						
Host nation(s) and year	Round	Pos	Pld	W	D	L	GF	GA	Squad	Outcome	Pld	W	D	L	GF	GA
(Philippines) 2025	Did not qualify									See AFC Women's Futsal Asian Cup						
Total	–	0/1	–	–	–	–	–	–	–	Total	–	–	–	–	–	–

=== AFC Women's Futsal Asian Cup ===
AFC Women's Futsal Asian Cup record										Qualification record						
Host nation(s) and year	Round	Pos	Pld	W	D	L	GF	GA	Squad	Outcome	Pld	W	D	L	GF	GA
(Malaysia) 2015	Did not enter									Did not enter						
(Thailand) 2018	Did not enter									Did not enter						
(China) 2025	Did not qualify									TBD	2	0	1	1	2	9
Total	–	0/3	–	–	–	–	–	–	–	Total	2	0	1	1	2	9

=== Asian Indoor and Martial Arts Games ===
Asian Indoor and Martial Arts Games record
Host nation(s) and year	Round	Pos	Pld	W	D	L	GF	GA	Squad
(Thailand) 2005	Did not enter								
(Macau) 2007	Did not enter								
(Vietnam) 2009	Did not enter								
(South Korea) 2013	Did not enter								
(Turkmenistan) 2017	Group stage	7th of 7	2	0	0	2	2	32	Squad
Total	–	1/5	2	0	0	2	2	32	–

=== WAFF Women's Futsal Championship ===
WAFF Women's Futsal Championship record
Host nation(s) and year	Round	Pos	Pld	W	D	L	GF	GA	Squad
(Jordan) 2008	Fourth place	4th of 7	4	1	0	3	17	31	Squad
(Bahrain) 2012	Group stage	5th of 7	3	2	0	1	14	7	Squad
(Saudi Arabia) 2022	Fifth place	5th of 6	3	1	0	2	6	14	Squad
Total	–	3/3	10	4	0	6	37	52	–

== See also ==
- Palestine national futsal team
