= Oman women's national futsal team =

National association women's futsal team

Oman
- Association: Oman Football Association
- Confederation: AFC (Asia)
- FIFA code: OMA
- FIFA ranking: 62 (24 September 2026)

First international
- Oman 1–6 Kuwait (Jeddah, Saudi Arabia, 18 June 2022)

Biggest defeat
- Oman 1–6 Kuwait (Jeddah, Saudi Arabia, 18 June 2022); Saudi Arabia 5–0 Oman (Jeddah, Saudi Arabia, 20 June 2022)

AFC Women's Futsal Championship
- Appearances: 0

The Oman women's national futsal team represents Oman in international women's futsal competitions and is controlled by the Oman Football Association.

== History ==
The Oman Football Association inaugurated its first women's national futsal team in May 2022. This followed the launch of the women's futsal league for the 2019–20 season. Plans to establish a women's national futsal team were announced as early as 2019.

Their first tournament was the 2022 WAFF Women's Futsal Championship.

== Results and fixtures ==
Legend

Win Draw Lose Fixture

== Players ==
=== Current squad ===
The following 14 players were called up for the 2022 WAFF Women's Futsal Championship from 16 to 22 June 2022.

No.	Pos.	Player	Date of birth (age)	Club
1	GK	Hasna Yousuf (Captain)		
2	FP	Marwa al-Ajmi		
3	FP	Safiyra al-Ghafri		
4	FP	Hiba al-Asmi	January 6, 1995 (age 31)	
5	FP	Laqa al-Housni		
6	FP	Maather al-Harthy		
7	FP	Hanan al-Ismaily		
8	FP	Naira al-Aamri		
9	FP	Layinat al-Musallami		
10	FP	Thara al-Ismaily		
11	FP	Jinan al-Riyami		
12	FP	Shamsalduha al-Khonji		
13	GK	Rua'a al-Suwaid		
14	GK	Amina al-Hakmani		

== Competitive record ==
=== WAFF Women's Futsal Championship ===
WAFF Women's Futsal Championship record
Hosts / Year	Result	GP	W	D*	L	GS	GA	GD
(Jordan) 2008	Did not enter (team did not exist)							
(Bahrain) 2012	Did not enter (team did not exist)							
(Saudi Arabia) 2022	Group stage	2	0	0	2	1	11	-10
Total	1/3	2	0	0	2	1	11	-10
