= Dima Al Ramhe =

Palestinian footballer (born 2001)

Dima Al Ramhe ديما الرمحي
Personal information
- Date of birth: 23 November 2001 (age 24)
- Place of birth: Haifa, Israel
- Position: Striker

Team information
- Current team: Boatot Tamra
- Number: 19

Youth career
- 2010–2016: Bnei Sakhnin

Senior career*
| Years | Team | Apps | (Gls) |
- Hapoel Araba
| 2024– | Boatot Tamra | | |

International career^{‡}
| 2016 | Israel U16 | 3 | (1) |
| 2017 | Israel U17 | 2 | (1) |
| 2018 | Israel U19 | 4 | (0) |
| 2023– | Palestine | 8 | (0) |
- * Club domestic league appearances and goals ‡ National team caps and goals as of 24 December 2024

Dima Al Ramhe (Note: In Palestine, her full name is Dima Issam Adel Al Rumhi.) (Arabic: ديما الرمحي, Hebrew: דימא אלרמחי; born 23 November 2001) is a professional footballer who plays as a striker for Boatot Tamra. Born in Israel, she plays for the Palestine national team.

== Club career ==
Residing in Shefa-Amr, Al Ramhe started playing football in the schoolyard before being introduced to Bnei Sakhnin. She joined the club and played with them for six years, during which she transitioned into professional football.

== International career ==
Born in Haifa, Israel, Al Ramhe holds dual Israeli and Palestinian nationality. She represented her birth country at under-17 and under-19 levels in UEFA Women's Youth European Championship qualification. She switched her international allegiance to Palestine at the senior level.

=== Youth level ===
In 2016, Al Ramhe received her first call-up to the Israeli under-16 team. A year later, she represented the Israeli U-17 team in the 2018 UEFA Women's Under-17 Championship qualification, playing two matches and scoring against Croatia to help the team qualify for the elite round. In April 2018, she was selected for the under-19 team for the 2018 edition Elite round and later for the 2019 edition qualifiers in October of the same year.

=== Senior ===
After switching her international allegiance to Palestine, Al Ramhe was called to the Palestinian Senior team for the 2024 WAFF Women's Championship in Jeddah, Saudi Arabia. She made her debut for the team as a starter on 20 February 2024 in a 3–0 win over Iraq.
