= Sabah Al-Salem =

Sabah Al-Salem صباح السالم
- District
- Location within Kuwait
- Country: Kuwait
- Governorate: Mubarak Al-Kabeer Governorate
- Elevation: 7.00 m (22.97 ft)

Population (2022)
  - Total: 139,163

Sabah Al-Salem (Arabic: صباح السالم) is an area in the Mubarak Al-Kabeer Governorate of Kuwait. As of 2022, its population is 139,163, spread out over 13 blocks. Sabah Al-Salem is an area of mixed development with residential, commercial, educational and entertainment facilities.

== Demographics ==
According to the Public Authority for Civil Information, Kuwaitis make up 53,393, or 57.66% of this area's population and non-Kuwaitis, on the other hand, make up around 39,213, or 42.34% There are 45,771 males and 46,835 females.

== Location ==
Sabah Al Salem is bordered by Mishref to the North, Adān to the south, Sabhan to the West, and Messila to the East and Southeast.

== Name origins ==
This area was named after the 12th Ruler of Kuwait and the 2nd Emir of the State of Kuwait, Sheikh Sabah Al-Salim Al-Sabah.

== See also ==
- List of cities in Kuwait
- Kuwait City
