= Women's football in Iraq =

- Country: Iraq
- Governing body: Iraq Football Association
- National team: Women's national team

National competitions
- Iraqi Women's Football League

International competitions
- Olympics; FIFA Women's World Cup(National Team); AFC Women's Asian Cup(National Team)

Women's football in Iraq is popular as there are less social restrictions on women than in the rest of the Arab world . One of the barriers to the sport's growth is the prejudice that many women experience as a result of playing the sport.

The national team has never taken part in the FIFA Women's World Cup or the AFC Women's Asian Cup. They are currently ranked joint 138th (and last) due to being inactive. In 2016, the Iraqi Women's Football League was founded and Ghaz Al-Shamal club won the first women's title.

== See also ==
- Football in Iraq
- Iraq women's national football team
- Iraq women's national under-17 football team
