= 2008 WAFF Women's Futsal Championship =

Tournament details
- Host country: Jordan
- Dates: 28 July – 2 August
- Teams: 7
- Venue: 1 (in 1 host city)

Final positions
- Champions: Iran (1st title)
- Runners-up: Jordan
- Third place: Syria
- Fourth place: Palestine

Tournament statistics
- Matches played: 13
- Goals scored: 145 (11.15 per match)

The 2008 WAFF Women's Futsal Championship was the inaugural women's futsal championship for the West Asian Football Federation. Iran was supposed to host the tournament but it was later moved to Jordan.

== Group stage ==
=== Group A ===
Team	Pld	W	D	L	GF	GA	Diff	Pts
Iran	3	3	0	0	30	4	+26	9
Syria	3	2	0	1	12	10	+2	6
Lebanon	3	1	0	2	10	10	0	3
Iraq	3	0	0	3	3	31	−28	0

28 July 2008
16:30

Iraq	3–8	Syria

Sports Palace
28 July 2008
18:00

Lebanon	2–8	Iran
Bakri; Haidar	Report

Sports Palace
29 July 2008
16:00

Iraq	0–7	Lebanon
	Report	El Jaafil; Haidar; Al Sayegh; Hamadeh; Chalhoub; Assaf

Sports Palace
29 July 2008
18:00

Syria	2–6	Iran

Sports Palace
30 July 2008
16:00

Iraq	0–16	Iran

Sports Palace
30 July 2008
18:00

Lebanon	1–2	Syria
Bakri	Report

Sports Palace

=== Group B ===
Team	Pld	W	D	L	GF	GA	Diff	Pts
Jordan	2	2	0	1	34	3	+31	6
Palestine	2	1	0	1	14	16	−2	3
Kuwait	2	0	0	2	0	29	−29	0

28 July 2008
18:00

Jordan	18–0	Kuwait

Sports Palace
29 July 2008
20:00

Jordan	16–3	Palestine

Sports Palace
30 July 2008
20:00

Palestine	11–0	Kuwait

Sports Palace

== Knockout stage ==
Semifinals
1 August 2008 – Sports Palace
Iran	11
Palestine	1
1 August 2008 – Sports Palace
Jordan	7
Syria	2

Final
2 August 2008 – Sports Palace
Iran	8
Jordan	7
Third place
2 August 2008 – Sports Palace
Palestine	2
Syria	4

=== Semi-finals ===
1 August 2008
17:00

Iran	11–1	Palestine

Sports Palace
1 August 2008
19:00

Jordan	7–2	Syria

Sports Palace

=== 3rd Place ===
2 August 2008
17:00

Palestine	2–4	Syria

Sports Palace

=== Final ===
2 August 2008
19:00

Iran	8–7 (a.e.t.)	Jordan

Sports Palace

== Awards ==
WAFF Women's Futsal Championship
2008 Champions

Iran
First Title

- Most Valuable Player
- Top Scorer
- Fair-Play Award
