= WAFF Women's Futsal Championship =

- Founded: 2008
- Region: West Asia (WAFF)
- Teams: 7
- Current champions: Iraq (1st title)
- Most championships: Iran (2 titles)
- Website: Official website
- 2022 WAFF Women's Futsal Championship

The WAFF Women's Futsal Championship is the West Asian Football Federation's futsal championship for women.

== Summary ==
Editions	Years	Hosts	Finals			Third place playoff			Number of teams
Editions	Years	Hosts	Winners	Scores	Runners-up	Third place	Score	Fourth place	Number of teams
1	2008	Jordan	Iran	8–7(aet)	Jordan	Syria	4–2	Palestine	7
2	2012	Bahrain	Iran	8–1	Jordan	Bahrain	8–5	Lebanon	7
3	2022	Saudi Arabia	Iraq	4–2	Saudi Arabia	Bahrain	2–0	Kuwait	6

== Participating associations by debut ==
Year	Debuting teams		
Year	Teams	No.	CT
2008	Iran, Iraq, Jordan, Kuwait, Lebanon, Palestine, Syria	7	7
2012	Bahrain, Qatar	2	9
2022	Oman, Saudi Arabia	2	11

== Overall team records ==
Teams are ranked by total points, then by goal difference, then by goals scored.

As of 2022 WAFF Women's Futsal Championship

Rank	Team	Part	Pld	W	D	L	GF	GA	GD	Pts
1	Iran	2	9	8	1	0	78	15	+63	25
2	Jordan	2	10	6	0	4	79	32	+47	18
3	Bahrain	2	8	5	0	3	26	18	+8	15
4	Palestine	3	10	4	0	6	37	52	-15	12
5	Lebanon	2	8	3	1	4	43	26	+17	10
6	Syria	1	5	3	0	2	18	19	-1	9
7	Iraq	3	9	3	0	6	28	55	-27	9
8	Saudi Arabia	1	4	2	0	2	9	7	+2	6
9	Kuwait	2	6	2	0	4	9	45	-36	6
10	Oman	1	3	0	0	3	2	17	-15	0
11	Qatar	1	3	0	0	3	0	48	-48	0

== Comprehensive team results by tournament ==
Legend

- 1st – Champions
- 2nd – Runners-up
- 3rd – Third place (not determined after 1993)
- 4th – Fourth place (not determined after 1993)
- SF – Semi-finals (since 1995)
- QF – Quarter-finals (since 2009)
- GS – Group stage
- Q – Qualified for upcoming tournament
- • – Did not qualify
- × – Did not enter / Withdrew / Banned
- – Hosts
- No longer WAFF member

For each tournament, the number of teams in each finals tournament (in brackets) are shown.

Team	2008 (Jordan) (7)	2012 (Bahrain) (7)	2022 (Saudi Arabia) (6)	Total
Bahrain	×	3rd	3rd	2
Iran	1st	1st		2
Iraq	GS	GS	1st	3
Jordan	2nd	2nd	×	2
Kuwait	GS	×	4th	2
Lebanon	GS	4th	×	2
Oman	×	×	GS	1
Palestine	4th	GS	GS	3
Qatar	×	GS	×	1
Saudi Arabia	×	×	2nd	1
Syria	3rd	×	×	1

== Performance by nations ==
Team	Champion	Runner-up	Third	Fourth
Iran	2 (2008, 2012)			
Iraq	1 (2022)			
Jordan		2 (2008*, 2012)		
Saudi Arabia		1 (2022*)		
Bahrain			1 (2012*, 2022)	
Syria			1 (2008)	
Palestine				1 (2008)
Lebanon				1 (2012)
Kuwait				1 (2022)

* as hosts

== See also ==
- WAFF Women's Championship
- WAFF Futsal Championship
