= 2018 AFC Women's Futsal Championship squads =

The following is a list of squads for each national team competing at the 2018 AFC Women's Futsal Championship. The tournament which took place during May 2018 in Thailand. It was the 2nd competition organised by the Asian Football Confederation (AFC) for the women's national teams of Asia.

Each team was required to register a squad of 14 players, minimum two of whom must be goalkeepers. The full squad listings are below.

== Group A ==
=== Thailand ===
Head coach: Udom Taveesuk

The final squad was named on 25 April 2018.

| No. | Pos. | Player | Date of birth (age) | Club |
|---|---|---|---|---|
| 1 | GK | Sasiprapha Suksen | 22 February 1991 (aged 27) | |
| 12 | GK | Pannipa Kamolrat | 8 October 1988 (aged 29) | (Football Association of Thailand) Bangkok FC |
| 2 | FP | Jenjira Bubpha | 14 February 1996 (aged 22) | (Football Association of Thailand) Bangkok FC |
| 3 | FP | Mutita Senkram | 29 July 1996 (aged 21) | (Football Association of Thailand) Sisaket |
| 4 | FP | Sawitree Mamyalee | 15 August 1993 (aged 24) | |
| 5 | FP | Hataichanok Tappakun | 2 June 1988 (aged 29) | |
| 6 | FP | Jiraprapa Tupsuri | 30 June 1988 (aged 29) | |
| 7 | FP | Pacharaporn Srimuang | 15 December 1994 (aged 23) | |
| 8 | FP | Orapin Waenngoen | 7 October 1995 (aged 22) | (Football Association of Thailand) BG Bundit Asia |
| 9 | FP | Jiraprapa Nimrattanasing | 22 March 1991 (aged 27) | |
| 10 | FP | Siranya Srimanee | 20 October 1989 (aged 28) | (Football Association of Thailand) BG Bundit Asia |
| 11 | FP | Natthamon Artkla | 27 November 1996 (aged 21) | |
| 13 | FP | Darika Peanpailun | 15 July 1992 (aged 25) | (Football Association of Thailand) BG Bundit Asia |
| 14 | FP | Sasicha Phothiwong | 14 June 1991 (aged 26) | (Football Association of Thailand) Bangkok FC |

=== Hong Kong ===
Head coach: Ho Wing Kam

| No. | Pos. | Player | Date of birth (age) | Club |
|---|---|---|---|---|
| 1 | GK | Wong Lok Man | 28 June 1982 (aged 35) | |
| 2 | FP | Sin Chung Yee | 8 August 1992 (aged 25) | (Football Association of Hong Kong, China) Happy Valley |
| 3 | FP | Wong So Han | 26 November 1991 (aged 26) | (Football Association of Hong Kong, China) Happy Valley |
| 4 | GK | Ng Cheuk Wai | 19 March 1997 (aged 21) | (Football Association of Hong Kong, China) Happy Valley |
| 5 | FP | Chu Ling Ling | 15 February 1987 (aged 31) | (Football Association of Hong Kong, China) Citizen |
| 6 | FP | Chan Wing Sze | 11 September 1983 (aged 34) | (Football Association of Hong Kong, China) Citizen |
| 7 | FP | Cheung Wai Ki | 22 November 1990 (aged 27) | (Football Australia) Brisbane Roar |
| 8 | FP | Ng Wing Kum | 6 May 1984 (aged 33) | (Football Association of Hong Kong, China) Citizen |
| 9 | FP | Kwong Wing Yan | 25 July 1984 (aged 33) | (Football Association of Hong Kong, China) Kitchee |
| 10 | FP | Wai Yuen Ting | 15 August 1992 (aged 25) | (Football Association of Hong Kong, China) Citizen |
| 11 | FP | Heidi Yuen | 22 August 1992 (aged 25) | (Football Association of Hong Kong, China) Citizen |
| 12 | FP | Wong Shuk Fan | 29 April 1980 (aged 38) | (Football Association of Hong Kong, China) Happy Valley |
| 13 | GK | Lung Wing Yan | 11 July 1981 (aged 36) | (Football Association of Hong Kong, China) Citizen |
| 14 | FP | Yiu Hei Man | 22 September 1990 (aged 27) | (Football Association of Hong Kong, China) Happy Valley |

=== Indonesia ===
Head coach: (Japan) Kensuke Takahashi

The final squad was named on 28 April 2018.

| No. | Pos. | Player | Date of birth (age) | Club |
|---|---|---|---|---|
| 1 | GK | Citra Adisti | 25 October 1989 (aged 28) | (Football Association of Indonesia) Kebumen United Angels |
| 2 | GK | Diyana Herlina | 29 May 1992 (aged 25) | (Football Association of Indonesia) Permata |
| 3 | FP | Dhia Putri Hapsari | 9 August 1993 (aged 24) | (Football Association of Indonesia) Kebumen United Angels |
| 4 | FP | Dinar Kartika | 21 April 2000 (aged 18) | (Football Association of Indonesia) Kebumen United Angels |
| 5 | FP | Fitriya Hilda | 2 February 1995 (aged 23) | (Football Association of Indonesia) Jaya Kencana Angels |
| 6 | FP | Novita Murni Piranti | 2 November 1990 (aged 27) | (Football Association of Indonesia) Bandung |
| 7 | FP | Anggi Puspitasari | 18 May 1992 (aged 25) | (Football Association of Indonesia) Jaya Kencana Angels |
| 8 | FP | Yunita Sari | 8 June 1991 (aged 26) | (Football Association of Indonesia) Bandung |
| 9 | FP | Maulina Novryliani | 14 November 1987 (aged 30) | (Football Association of Indonesia) Kebumen United Angels |
| 10 | FP | Rani Mulyasari | 4 March 1993 (aged 25) | (Football Association of Indonesia) Bandung |
| 11 | FP | Suciana Yuliani | 11 July 1992 (aged 25) | (Football Association of Indonesia) Kebumen United Angels |
| 12 | FP | Fitri Rosdiana | 23 March 1993 (aged 25) | (Football Association of Indonesia) Bandung |
| 13 | FP | Jesella Arifya Sari | 6 March 2002 (aged 16) | (Football Association of Indonesia) Banteng Muda Malang |
| 14 | FP | Febriana Kusumaningrum | 2 February 1994 (aged 24) | (Football Association of Indonesia) Kebumen United Angels |

=== Macau ===
Head coach: Chiang Ka Chon

| No. | Pos. | Player | Date of birth (age) | Club |
|---|---|---|---|---|
| 1 | GK | Ho Ka I | 14 August 1995 (aged 22) | |
| 13 | GK | Hao Ka Wan | 25 April 1996 (aged 22) | |
| 14 | GK | Chao Tsz Wai | | (Football Association of Hong Kong, China) Eastern |
| 2 | FP | Leong Ka Kei | 29 March 1986 (aged 32) | |
| 3 | FP | Kuok Ut Meng | 16 March 1978 (aged 40) | |
| 4 | FP | Hoi Ka Kei | | |
| 5 | FP | Chan On Na | 5 September 1987 (aged 30) | |
| 6 | FP | Li Xiaochun | 14 August 1989 (aged 28) | |
| 7 | FP | Hoi Weng Leng | 14 March 1997 (aged 21) | |
| 8 | FP | Fong Iok Wa | 24 August 1994 (aged 23) | |
| 9 | FP | Kuan Chi Kio | 17 September 1996 (aged 21) | |
| 10 | FP | Chan Ka Kei (2) | 2 March 2001 (aged 17) | |
| 11 | FP | Chan Ka Hei | | |
| 12 | FP | Chan Ka Kei (1) | 23 October 1990 (aged 27) | |

== Group B ==
=== Malaysia ===
Head coach: Addie Azwan

The final squad was named on 30 April 2018.

| No. | Pos. | Player | Date of birth (age) | Club |
|---|---|---|---|---|
| 1 | GK | Noorasyiemah Rashid | | (Football Association of Malaysia) Perak FA |
| 3 | GK | Zufirah Nasir | 7 September 1993 (aged 24) | (Football Association of Malaysia) MPSJ |
| 2 | FP | Izzati Khairudin | 8 March 1988 (aged 30) | (Football Association of Malaysia) FELDA United |
| 4 | FP | Masyita Tajib | 16 January 1989 (aged 29) | (Football Association of Malaysia) Negeri Sembilan |
| 5 | FP | Atiqah Rashid | 23 July 1992 (aged 25) | (Football Association of Malaysia) FELDA United |
| 6 | FP | Nurul Hamira | 26 October 1992 (aged 25) | (Football Association of Malaysia) Perak FA |
| 7 | FP | Steffi Kaur | 25 October 1988 (aged 29) | (Football Association of Malaysia) MPSJ |
| 8 | FP | Hanis Farhana | 10 November 1992 (aged 25) | (Football Association of Malaysia) FELDA United |
| 9 | FP | Norhawa Yasin | 24 February 1993 (aged 25) | (Football Association of Malaysia) MPSJ |
| 10 | FP | Fatin Shahida | 10 May 1991 (aged 26) | (Football Association of Malaysia) MPSJ |
| 11 | FP | Shazreen Munazli | 21 December 1993 (aged 24) | (Football Association of Malaysia) MPSJ |
| 12 | FP | Asnidah Zamri | 25 February 1999 (aged 19) | (Football Association of Malaysia) FELDA United |
| 13 | FP | Intan Sarah | 10 July 1999 (aged 18) | (Football Association of Malaysia) FELDA United |
| 14 | FP | Zurain Kamarudin | 10 February 1997 (aged 21) | (Football Association of Malaysia) FELDA United |

=== Vietnam ===
Head coach: Trương Quốc Tuấn

The final squad was named on 27 April 2018.

| No. | Pos. | Player | Date of birth (age) | Club |
|---|---|---|---|---|
| 1 | GK | Quách Thu Em | 30 January 1995 (aged 23) | (Vietnam Football Federation) District 1, HCM |
| 14 | GK | Ngô Nguyễn Thùy Linh | 21 June 1997 (aged 20) | (Vietnam Football Federation) Thái Nguyên Sports Center |
| 2 | FP | Đỗ Thị Nguyên | 10 September 1993 (aged 24) | (Vietnam Football Federation) Hà Nam Sports & Gymnastics Center |
| 3 | FP | Lê Thị Thùy Linh | 8 September 1993 (aged 24) | (Vietnam Football Federation) District 8, HCM |
| 4 | FP | Nguyễn Thị Hạnh | 20 September 1986 (aged 31) | (Vietnam Football Federation) District 8, HCM |
| 5 | FP | Biện Thị Hằng | 9 August 1997 (aged 20) | (Vietnam Football Federation) Hanoi Sports & Gymnastics Center |
| 6 | FP | Nguyễn Thị Châu | 18 June 1988 (aged 29) | (Vietnam Football Federation) District 8, HCM |
| 7 | FP | Phó Ngọc Thanh Thy | | (Vietnam Football Federation) District 8, HCM |
| 8 | FP | Võ Thị Thùy Trinh | 28 July 1989 (aged 28) | (Vietnam Football Federation) District 1, HCM |
| 9 | FP | Trịnh Nguyễn Thanh Hằng | 10 October 1990 (aged 27) | (Vietnam Football Federation) District 8, HCM |
| 10 | FP | Lê Thu Thanh Hương | 21 September 1991 (aged 26) | (Vietnam Football Federation) Hà Nam Sports & Gymnastics Center |
| 11 | FP | Nguyễn Thị Thành | 25 August 1986 (aged 31) | (Vietnam Football Federation) Thuong Tin Center |
| 12 | FP | Nguyễn Thị Huế | 11 February 1993 (aged 25) | (Vietnam Football Federation) Hanoi Sports & Gymnastics Center |
| 13 | FP | Bùi Thị Trang | 21 November 1996 (aged 21) | (Vietnam Football Federation) Hanoi Sports & Gymnastics Center |

=== Chinese Taipei ===
Head coach: Chang Yao-ming

The final squad was named on 24 April 2018.

| No. | Pos. | Player | Date of birth (age) | Club |
|---|---|---|---|---|
| 1 | GK | Chiu Yu-ting | | Unattached |
| 12 | GK | Li I-chieh | | (Chinese Taipei Football Association) Laiyi High School |
| 2 | FP | Chung Yi-hsuan | | (Chinese Taipei Football Association) National Taiwan Normal Univ. |
| 3 | FP | Hsieh Pei-fen | | Unattached |
| 4 | FP | Kuo Tsu-erh | | (Chinese Taipei Football Association) National Pingtung Univ. |
| 5 | FP | Tang Yung-ching | | Unattached |
| 6 | FP | Chen Ya-chun | | (Chinese Taipei Football Association) National Taiwan Normal Univ. |
| 7 | FP | Tsai Chi-yun | | (Chinese Taipei Football Association) Hsing Wu Univ. |
| 8 | FP | Wang Shu-wen | 1 March 2001 (aged 17) | (Chinese Taipei Football Association) Minxiong University of Agriculture |
| 9 | FP | Ho Chia-chen | | (Chinese Taipei Football Association) WuFeng Univ. |
| 10 | FP | Chen Pin-hui | | (Chinese Taipei Football Association) San-Chung Commercial High School |
| 11 | FP | Li Pei-jung | 25 April 2000 (aged 18) | (Chinese Taipei Football Association) Taitung University Affiliated Sports School |
| 13 | FP | Hsieh I-ling | 15 January 1988 (aged 30) | (Chinese Taipei Football Association) New Taipei Municipal Yungho Junior School |
| 14 | FP | Lin Ya-hui | 27 November 1991 (aged 26) | (Chinese Taipei Football Association) Guanghua National High School |

=== Bangladesh ===
Head coach: Golam Robbani Choton

The final squad was named on 29 April 2018.

| No. | Pos. | Player | Date of birth (age) | Club |
|---|---|---|---|---|
| 1 | GK | Rupna Chakma | 2 January 2004 (aged 14) | |
| 14 | GK | Ruksana Begum | 5 February 2001 (aged 17) | |
| 2 | FP | Anai Mogini | 1 March 2003 (aged 15) | |
| 3 | FP | Sheuli Azim | 20 December 2001 (aged 16) | |
| 4 | FP | Akhi Khatun | 18 June 2003 (aged 14) | |
| 5 | FP | Masura Parvin | 17 October 2001 (aged 16) | |
| 6 | FP | Monika Chakma | 15 September 2003 (aged 14) | |
| 7 | FP | Sanjida Akhter | 20 March 2001 (aged 17) | |
| 8 | FP | Maria Manda | 10 May 2003 (aged 14) | |
| 9 | FP | Sirat Jahan Shopna | 10 April 2001 (aged 17) | |
| 10 | FP | Sabina Khatun | 25 October 1993 (aged 24) | (All India Football Federation) Sethu |
| 11 | FP | Marzia Akter | 15 October 2002 (aged 15) | |
| 12 | FP | Krishna Rani Sarkar | 1 January 2001 (aged 17) | (All India Football Federation) Sethu |
| 13 | FP | Shamsunnahar | 31 January 2003 (aged 15) | |

== Group C ==
=== Japan ===
Head coach: Kenichiro Kogure

The final squad was named on 16 April 2018.

| No. | Pos. | Player | Date of birth (age) | Club |
|---|---|---|---|---|
| 1 | GK | Ayaka Yamamoto | 2 October 1986 (aged 31) | (Japan Football Association) SWH Futsal Club |
| 12 | GK | Aiko Sugiyama | 2 May 1988 (aged 30) | (Japan Football Association) Fugador Sumida |
| 2 | FP | Masami Kato | 27 May 1991 (aged 26) | (Japan Football Association) Arcoiris Kobe |
| 3 | FP | Mika Eguchi | 25 November 1994 (aged 23) | (Japan Football Association) Arcoiris Kobe |
| 4 | FP | Saki Yotsui | 19 March 1996 (aged 22) | (Japan Football Association) Bardral Urayasu |
| 5 | FP | Riho Katsumata | 21 November 1993 (aged 24) | (Japan Football Association) Fugador Sumida |
| 6 | FP | Misato Komura | 21 March 1984 (aged 34) | (Japan Football Association) Arcoiris Kobe |
| 7 | FP | Junko Yokoyama | 2 April 1991 (aged 27) | (Japan Football Association) Fugador Sumida |
| 8 | FP | Anna Amishiro | 8 July 1991 (aged 26) | (Japan Football Association) SWH Futsal Club |
| 9 | FP | Ryo Egawa | 30 March 1996 (aged 22) | (Japan Football Association) Bardral Urayasu |
| 10 | FP | Shiori Nakajima | 12 July 1988 (aged 29) | (Royal Spanish Football Federation) FSF Móstoles |
| 11 | FP | Eri Wakabayashi | 24 February 1985 (aged 33) | (Japan Football Association) Arcoiris Kobe |
| 13 | FP | Hinako Chida | 2 September 1996 (aged 21) | (Japan Football Association) Fuchu Athletic |
| 14 | FP | Mio Fujita | 13 April 1994 (aged 24) | (Japan Football Association) Fuchu Athletic |

=== China PR ===
Head coach: Hu Jie

| No. | Pos. | Player | Date of birth (age) | Club |
|---|---|---|---|---|
| 1 | GK | Zhang Meini | | |
| 12 | GK | Cui Yuanyuan | | |
| 2 | FP | Ma Handi | 29 July 1997 (aged 20) | |
| 3 | FP | Li Yingqing | | |
| 4 | FP | Ma Yiming | 31 March 1993 (aged 25) | |
| 5 | FP | Fan Yuqiu | 2 October 1997 (aged 20) | |
| 6 | FP | Tian Jiao | 25 April 1993 (aged 25) | |
| 7 | FP | Zhang Yue | 1 January 1990 (aged 28) | |
| 8 | FP | Zhan Huimin | 14 July 1990 (aged 27) | |
| 9 | FP | Zeng Qingqing | | |
| 10 | FP | Wang Ting | 8 February 1989 (aged 29) | |
| 11 | FP | Shen Nan | 13 September 1988 (aged 29) | |
| 13 | FP | Li Jingjing | 10 June 1993 (aged 24) | |
| 14 | FP | Liu Dan | | |

=== Bahrain ===
Head coach: Elrashid Bukhari Ahmed

| No. | Pos. | Player | Date of birth (age) | Club |
|---|---|---|---|---|
| 1 | GK | Dalal Saleh | | |
| 12 | GK | Nouf Al Khalifa | 12 January 1989 (aged 29) | |
| 2 | FP | Rose Fayez Tobellah | 28 January 1998 (aged 20) | |
| 3 | FP | Eman Ramadhan | 7 January 1993 (aged 25) | |
| 4 | FP | Deena Abdelrahman | 23 February 1983 (aged 35) | |
| 5 | FP | Marwa Mubarak | 13 September 1988 (aged 29) | |
| 6 | FP | Eman Al-Khattal | 14 March 1999 (aged 19) | |
| 7 | FP | Hessa Al-Isa | 30 August 1995 (aged 22) | |
| 8 | FP | Dwa Al-Khalifa | 29 November 1987 (aged 30) | |
| 9 | FP | Rawan Al-Ali | 26 October 2000 (aged 17) | |
| 10 | FP | Alyaa Al-Mudhahki | 3 July 1989 (aged 28) | |
| 11 | FP | Yasmeen Tobellah | 17 September 1989 (aged 28) | |
| 13 | FP | Manar Yaqoob | 27 July 1994 (aged 23) | |
| 14 | FP | Fatema Isa | 14 December 1990 (aged 27) | |

=== Lebanon ===
Head coach: Maroun El-Khoury

The final squad was named on 23 April 2018.

| No. | Pos. | Player | Date of birth (age) | Club |
|---|---|---|---|---|
| 1 | GK | Reine Alameh | 12 April 1991 (aged 27) | (Lebanese Football Association) SAS |
| 2 | GK | Nathaline Gilinguirian | 12 April 1986 (aged 32) | (Lebanese Football Association) Zouk Mosbeh |
| 3 | FP | Yara Hosry | 13 February 1999 (aged 19) | (Lebanese Football Association) AUST |
| 4 | FP | Joanne Beaumier | 10 April 1996 (aged 22) | (Lebanese Football Association) Zouk Mosbeh |
| 5 | FP | Nathalie Matar | 20 September 1995 (aged 22) | (Lebanese Football Association) Zouk Mosbeh |
| 6 | FP | Rayane Rachid | 28 July 1994 (aged 23) | (Lebanese Football Association) Zouk Mosbeh |
| 7 | FP | Taghrid Hamadeh | 1 June 1988 (aged 29) | (Lebanese Football Association) Zouk Mosbeh |
| 8 | FP | Léa Dahrouge | | (Lebanese Football Association) Saint Joseph University |
| 9 | FP | Sara Bakri | 1 November 1989 (aged 28) | (Lebanese Football Association) SAS |
| 10 | FP | Nancy Tchaylian | 28 May 1991 (aged 26) | (Lebanese Football Association) Zouk Mosbeh |
| 11 | FP | Aya Jamal Eddine | 11 October 1997 (aged 20) | (Lebanese Football Association) AUST |
| 12 | FP | Jana Assi | 2 July 1999 (aged 18) | (Lebanese Football Association) AUST |
| 13 | FP | Reem Chalhoub | | (Lebanese Football Association) SAS |
| 14 | FP | Marie Joe Wakim | | (Lebanese Football Association) Zouk Mosbeh |

== Group D ==
=== Iran ===
Head coach: Shahrzad Mozaffar

The final squad was named on 22 April 2018.

| No. | Pos. | Player | Date of birth (age) | Club |
|---|---|---|---|---|
| 1 | GK | Farzaneh Tavasolisis | 19 January 1987 (aged 31) | (Football Federation Islamic Republic of Iran) Tehran |
| 2 | GK | Tahereh Mehdipour | 19 August 1996 (aged 21) | (Football Federation Islamic Republic of Iran) Khuzestan |
| 3 | GK | Leila Khodabandehlou | 14 October 1991 (aged 26) | (Football Federation Islamic Republic of Iran) Alborz |
| 4 | FP | Fatemeh Arzhangi | 6 September 1987 (aged 30) | (Football Federation Islamic Republic of Iran) Razavi Khorasan |
| 5 | FP | Sara Shirbeigi | 6 August 1991 (aged 26) | (Football Federation Islamic Republic of Iran) Kermanshah |
| 6 | FP | Fereshteh Khosravi | 11 April 1996 (aged 22) | (Football Federation Islamic Republic of Iran) Khuzestan |
| 7 | FP | Fereshteh Karimi | 6 February 1989 (aged 29) | (Football Federation Islamic Republic of Iran) Tehran |
| 8 | FP | Fatemeh Papi | 14 November 1990 (aged 27) | (Football Federation Islamic Republic of Iran) Khuzestan |
| 9 | FP | Mahsa Kamali | | (Football Federation Islamic Republic of Iran) Zanjan |
| 10 | FP | Nasimeh Gholami | 18 July 1985 (aged 32) | (Football Federation Islamic Republic of Iran) Tehran |
| 11 | FP | Nastaran Moghimi | 16 July 1990 (aged 27) | (Football Federation Islamic Republic of Iran) Mazandaran |
| 12 | FP | Fahimeh Zarei | 24 December 1985 (aged 32) | (Football Federation Islamic Republic of Iran) Hormozgan |
| 13 | FP | Fatemeh Etedadi | 16 January 1989 (aged 29) | (Football Federation Islamic Republic of Iran) Qazvin |
| 14 | FP | Arezoo Sadaghiani | 1 July 1990 (aged 27) | (Football Federation Islamic Republic of Iran) Tehran |

=== Uzbekistan ===
Head coach: Avaz Maksumov

The final squad was named on 25 April 2018.

| No. | Pos. | Player | Date of birth (age) | Club |
|---|---|---|---|---|
| 1 | GK | Laylo Tilovova | 8 March 1997 (aged 21) | (Uzbekistan Football Association) Sevinch |
| 12 | GK | Maftuna Jonimqulova | 26 July 1999 (aged 18) | (Uzbekistan Football Association) Sevinch |
| 2 | FP | Malika Burkhonova | 22 February 1999 (aged 19) | (Uzbekistan Football Association) Sevinch |
| 3 | FP | Zumratjon Nazarova | 27 May 1992 (aged 25) | (Uzbekistan Football Association) Metallurg |
| 4 | FP | Nozima Kamoltoeva | 19 September 1998 (aged 19) | (Uzbekistan Football Association) Metallurg |
| 5 | FP | Kholida Dadaboeva | 12 April 1993 (aged 25) | (Uzbekistan Football Association) Metallurg |
| 6 | FP | Irodahon Turdalieva | 6 April 1995 (aged 23) | (Uzbekistan Football Association) Metallurg |
| 7 | FP | Feruza Turdiboeva | 6 January 1994 (aged 24) | (Uzbekistan Football Association) Metallurg |
| 8 | FP | Maluda Munavarova | 12 October 1988 (aged 29) | (Uzbekistan Football Association) Metallurg |
| 9 | FP | Lyudmila Karachik | 8 December 1994 (aged 23) | (Uzbekistan Football Association) Bunyodkor |
| 10 | FP | Rushaniya Safina | 25 November 1993 (aged 24) | (Uzbekistan Football Association) Bunyodkor |
| 11 | FP | Maftuna Shoyimova | 1 January 1999 (aged 19) | (Uzbekistan Football Association) Sevinch |
| 13 | FP | Tanzilya Zarbieva | 8 February 1999 (aged 19) | (Uzbekistan Football Association) Sevinch |
| 14 | FP | Nilufar Kudratova | 5 June 1997 (aged 20) | (Uzbekistan Football Association) Sevinch |

=== Turkmenistan ===
Head coach: Kamil Mingazow

The final squad was named on 30 April 2018.

| No. | Pos. | Player | Date of birth (age) | Club |
|---|---|---|---|---|
| 1 | GK | Malika Eminowa | 14 April 1997 (aged 21) | |
| 12 | GK | Ogulbahar Halylowa | 7 April 1992 (aged 26) | |
| 13 | GK | Rima Şepturowa | 21 December 1995 (aged 22) | |
| 2 | FP | Nikol Kulikowa | 14 September 1999 (aged 18) | |
| 3 | FP | Shirin Mämmetnäzarowa | | |
| 4 | FP | Mahym Orazmedowa | 13 July 1993 (aged 24) | |
| 5 | FP | Suraý Mämmetsähedowa | 19 June 2000 (aged 17) | |
| 6 | FP | Ejeş Amanmuhammedowa | 10 April 2001 (aged 17) | |
| 7 | FP | Bagtygül Gurbanowa | 25 October 1993 (aged 24) | |
| 8 | FP | Halida Eşnyýazowa | 14 February 1995 (aged 23) | |
| 9 | FP | Gözel Artykowa | 17 February 1999 (aged 19) | |
| 10 | FP | Mariýa Çaryýewa | 20 April 2000 (aged 18) | |
| 11 | FP | Maýa Musaskaýa | 16 January 2000 (aged 18) | |
| 14 | FP | Albina Mingazowa | | |
