= 2025 AFC Women's Futsal Asian Cup squads =

The following is a list of squads for each national team competing at the 2025 AFC Women's Futsal Asian Cup. The tournament took place from 6 to 17 May 2025 in Hohhot, China. Previously known as the AFC Women's Futsal Championship, it was the third edition and was organised by the Asian Football Confederation (AFC).

Each team must register a squad of 14 players, minimum two of whom must be goalkeepers.

The full squad listings are below.

== Group A ==
=== China ===
The following is the final squad for China.

Head coach: Hu Jie

- 1 Liu Danping (GK)
- 2 Fan Yuqiu
- 3 Ke Yaoxiang
- 4 Xiong Jing
- 5 Jiang Xiaoyu
- 7 Zhang Rui
- 8 Zhan Huimin (captain)
- 9 Cao Jiayi
- 10 Yu Ting
- 11 Su Jiahong
- 12 Ma Shuting (GK)
- 13 Zou Yinglan
- 14 Zhan Zewen
- 22 Tang Yalan

=== Uzbekistan ===
The following is the final squad for Uzbekistan.

Head coach: Farrukh Zakirov

- 1 Nilufar Bakhtiyarova (GK)
- 2 Madina Khikmatova
- 3 Darina Fedosenko
- 4 Madina Vokhidova
- 5 Zumratjon Nazarova (captain)
- 6 Kholida Dadaboeva
- 7 Feruza Turdiboeva
- 8 Aigerim Otenazarova
- 9 Dildora Nozimova
- 10 Rushaniya Safina
- 11 Gulzoda Amirova
- 12 Angelina Polyshkevich (GK)
- 13 Omina Valikhanova
- 14 Shodiya Tosheva

=== Chinese Taipei ===
The final squad for Chinese Taipei was named on 28 April 2025.

Head coach: Hsieh Li-chuan

- 1 Chu Fang-yi (GK)
- 2 Yang Yu-jing
- 3 Liu Chih-ling
- 4 Liu Wen-ling
- 5 Ou Yi-shian (GK)
- 6 Chang Chi
- 7 Lu Ching-wen
- 8 Lin Dai-chi
- 9 Ho Chia-chen
- 10 Su Hui-chi
- 11 Chen Min-huang
- 12 Tsou Hsin-ni
- 13 Jheng Ya-zih
- 14 Chen Ya-chun (captain)

=== Australia ===
The final squad for Australia was named on 17 April 2025.

Head coach: Miles Downie

- 1 Sarah Easthope (GK)
- 2 Gisella Pipino
- 3 Estelle Fragale
- 4 Alexia Karrys-Stahl
- 5 Jessica McLean (GK)
- 6 Amy Barker
- 7 Jessica Au
- 8 Daisy Arrowsmith
- 9 Marianna Tabain
- 10 Trudy Camilleri (captain)
- 11 Halle Smit
- 12 Zoee Spadano
- 13 Meaghan McElligott
- 14 Claudia Fruscalzo

== Group B ==
=== Iran ===
The final squad for Iran was named on 28 April 2025.

Head coach: Forouzan Soleimani

- 1 Farzaneh Tavasoli (GK) (captain)
- 2 Mahdiyeh Mahmoudi (GK)
- 3 Fatemeh Hosseini
- 4 Fatemeh Rahmati
- 5 Sara Shirbeigi
- 6 Fereshteh Khosravi
- 7 Fereshteh Karimi
- 8 Elham Anafjeh
- 9 Zahra Kiyani Manesh
- 10 Nasimeh Gholami
- 11 Nastaran Moghimi
- 12 Tahereh Mehdi Pour (GK)
- 13 Mahtab Banaei
- 14 Maral Torkaman

=== Vietnam ===
The final squad for Vietnam was named on 9 April 2025.

Head coach: Nguyễn Đình Hoàng

- 1 Trần Thị Hải Yến (GK)
- 2 Nguyễn Thị Vân Anh
- 3 Trần Thị Thu Xuân
- 4 Trần Thị Lan Mai
- 5 Trần Nguyệt Vi
- 6 Lê Thị Thanh Ngân
- 7 Nguyễn Phương Anh
- 8 Trần Thị Thùy Trang
- 9 Trịnh Nguyễn Thanh Hằng (captain)
- 10 Phó Ngọc Thanh Thy
- 11 K'Thủa
- 12 Biện Thị Hằng
- 13 Bùi Thị Trang
- 14 Ngô Nguyễn Thùy Linh (GK)

=== Hong Kong ===
The final squad for Hong Kong was named on 24 April 2025.

Head coach: Ho Wing Kam

- 1 Ng Cheuk Wai (GK)
- 2 Chow Kam Yee (GK)
- 3 Wong So Han
- 4 Poon Ka Ka
- 5 So Hoi Lam
- 6 Chan Wing Sze (captain)
- 7 Cheung Wai Ki
- 8 Wu Choi Yiu
- 9 Tsang Lai Mae Halasan
- 10 Tsang Lai Shan Cindy
- 11 Chung Pui Ki
- 12 Wong Shuk Fan
- 13 Kung Yuet Charis
- 14 Hung Ching Hing (GK)

=== Philippines ===
The final squad for the Philippines was named on 29 April 2025.

Head coach: (Spain) Rafa Merino

- 1 Samantha Hughes (GK)
- 2 Vrendelle Nuera
- 3 Cathrine Graversen
- 4 Kayla Santiago (GK)
- 5 Dionesa Tolentin
- 6 Lanie Ortillo
- 7 Isabella Bandoja
- 8 Regine Rebosura
- 9 Alisha del Campo
- 10 Judy Connolly
- 11 Isabella Flanigan (captain)
- 12 Hazel Lustan
- 13 Rocelle Mendaño
- 14 Charisa Lemoran

== Group C ==
=== Thailand ===
The following is the final squad for Thailand.

Head coach: Tanatorn Santanaprasit

- 1 Suksen Sasiprapha (GK)
- 2 Nuengruethai Sorahong (GK)
- 3 Jenjira Bubpha
- 4 Patitta Moolpho
- 5 Hataichanok Tappakun (captain)
- 6 Sasikarn Tongdee
- 8 Paerploy Huajaipetch
- 9 Arriya Saetoen
- 11 Nattamon Artkla
- 10 Lalida Chimpabut
- 12 Saovapha Tranga
- 13 Darika Peanpailun
- 14 Janistar Nunabee
- 22 Sangrawee Meekham

=== Japan ===
The final squad for Japan was named on 17 April 2025.

Head coach: Takehiro Suga

- 1 Nene Inoue (GK)
- 2 Yuria Suto (GK)
- 3 Mika Eguchi
- 4 Saki Yotsui
- 5 Kaho Ito (captain)
- 6 Aki Ikeuchi
- 7 Sara Oino
- 8 Yukari Miyahara
- 9 Ryo Egawa
- 10 Anna Amishiro
- 11 Risa Ikadai
- 12 Yuka Iwasaki
- 13 Kyoka Takahashi
- 14 Naomi Matsumoto

=== Indonesia ===
The final squad for Indonesia was named on 24 April 2025.

Head coach: (Portugal) Luís Estrela

- 1 Sella Salsadila Agustin (GK)
- 2 Diyana Herliana (GK)
- 3 Insyafadya Salsabillah
- 4 Dinar Kartika
- 5 Fitriya Hilda
- 6 Novita Murni (captain)
- 7 Diah Tri Lestari
- 8 Dhea Febrina
- 9 Alya Ananda
- 10 Fitri Rosdiana
- 11 Agnes Matulapelwa
- 12 Jein Sitty Way
- 13 Ikeu Rosita
- 14 Nisma Francida

=== Bahrain ===
The following is the final squad for Bahrain.

Head coach: (Brazil) Lino Gomes

- 1 Dalal Saleh (GK)
- 2 Fatema Ali
- 3 Eman Al-Khattal
- 4 Fatema Al-Nesuf
- 5 Al-Anood Al Khalifa
- 6 Farah Khaled
- 7 Rawan Al-Ali
- 8 Amira Sowar
- 9 Hessa Al-Isa
- 10 Alyaa Al-Mudhahki (captain)
- 11 Rose Tobellah
- 12 Khulood Abdulla (GK)
- 13 Manar Yaqoob
- 14 Leleya Sabkar
