= Wong Shuk Fan =

Hong Kong footballer

Personal information
- Date of birth: 29 April 1980 (age 46)
- Place of birth: Hong Kong
- Position: Midfielder

International career^{‡}
Years	Team	Apps	(Gls)
2009–2019	Hong Kong	11+	(0+)
2015–2018	Hong Kong (futsal)	2+	(0+)
- ‡ National team caps and goals as of 9 April 2019.

Wong Shuk Fan (born 29 April 1980) is a Hong Kong footballer who plays as a midfielder. She is also a futsal player, and represented Hong Kong internationally in both football and futsal.

== International career ==
Wong Shuk Fan has been capped for Hong Kong at senior level in both football and futsal. In football, she represented Hong Kong at two AFC Women's Asian Cup qualifications (2010 and 2014) and two AFC Women's Olympic Qualifying Tournament editions (2012 and 2020).

In futsal, Wong Shuk Fan played for Hong Kong at two AFC Women's Futsal Championship editions (2015 and 2018).

== International goals ==
No.	Date	Venue	Opponent	Score	Result	Competition
1.	18 November 2014	Taipei Municipal Stadium, Taipei, Taiwan	Guam	3–0	3–0	2015 EAFF Women's East Asian Cup

== See also ==
- List of Hong Kong women's international footballers
