= Kwong Wing Yan =

Hong Kong football and futsal player

Personal information
- Full name: Kwong Wing Yan
- Date of birth: 25 July 1984 (age 42)
- Place of birth: Hong Kong
- Position: Forward

International career^{‡}
Years	Team	Apps	(Gls)
2009–2018	Hong Kong	12+	(3)
2015–2018	Hong Kong (futsal)		(2)
- ‡ National team caps and goals as of 4 December 2018

Kwong Wing Yan (born 25 July 1984) is a Hong Kong footballer who plays as a forward. She is also a futsal player, and represented Hong Kong internationally in both football and futsal.

== International career ==
Kwong Wing Yan has been capped for Hong Kong at senior level in both football and futsal. In football, she represented Hong Kong at four AFC Women's Asian Cup qualification editions (2008, 2010, 2014 and 2018), two AFC Women's Olympic Qualifying Tournament editions (2012 and 2020) and two EAFF E-1 Football Championship editions (2017 and 2019).

In futsal, Kwong Wing Yan played for Hong Kong at two AFC Women's Futsal Championship editions (2015 and 2018).

== International goals ==
No.	Date	Venue	Opponent	Score	Result	Competition
1.	11 November 2018	IPE Chonburi Stadium, Chonburi, Thailand	Lebanon	4–0	4–0	2020 AFC Women's Olympic Qualifying Tournament
2.	5 December 2018	Guam Football Association National Training Center, Dededo, Guam	Mongolia	1–0	3–0	2019 EAFF E-1 Football Championship
3.	5 December 2018	Guam Football Association National Training Center, Dededo, Guam	Mongolia	2–0	3–0	2019 EAFF E-1 Football Championship

== See also ==
- List of Hong Kong women's international footballers
