= Lebanon women's national futsal team =

Lebanon
- Nickname(s): صبايا الأرز (The Lady Cedars)
- Association: Lebanese Football Association (LFA)
- Confederation: AFC (Asia); WAFF (West Asia)
- Head coach: Maroun El Khoury
- Home stadium: Various
- FIFA code: LBN
- FIFA ranking: 42 (24 September 2026)
- Highest FIFA ranking: 29 (May–October 2024)
- Lowest FIFA ranking: 29 (May–October 2024)
| Home colours | Away colours |

First international
- Lebanon 2–8 Iran (Jordan, 28 July 2008)

Biggest win
- Lebanon 19–0 Qatar (Isa Town, Bahrain, 8 April 2012)

Biggest defeat
- Lebanon 2–8 Iran (Jordan, 28 July 2008); China 0–6 Lebanon (Bangkok, Thailand, 7 May 2018)

AFC Women's Futsal Asian Cup
- Appearances: 1 (First in 2018)
- Best result: Group stage (2018)

WAFF Women's Futsal Championship
- Appearances: 2 (First in 2008)
- Best result: Fourth place (2012)

The Lebanon women's national futsal team (Arabic: منتخب لبنان لكرة الصالات النسائي; French: Équipe du Liban féminine de futsal) represents Lebanon in international women's futsal competitions. Nicknamed "the Lady Cedars", the team is controlled by the Lebanese Football Association (LFA).

While Lebanon has yet to participate in the FIFA Futsal Women's World Cup, they have participated once at the AFC Women's Futsal Asian Cup, in 2018, and twice in the WAFF Women's Futsal Championship, finishing fourth in 2012.

== Competitive record ==
=== FIFA Futsal Women's World Cup ===
| FIFA Futsal Women's World Cup record | | | | | | | | | Qualification record | | | | | | |
| Host nation(s) and year | Round | Pos | Pld | W | D | L | GF | GA | Outcome | Pld | W | D | L | GF | GA |
|---|---|---|---|---|---|---|---|---|---|---|---|---|---|---|---|
| (Philippines) 2025 | Did not qualify | | | | | | | | 5th of 5 | 4 | 0 | 1 | 3 | 2 | 10 |
| Total | 0/1 | – | – | – | – | – | – | – | Total | 4 | 0 | 1 | 3 | 2 | 10 |

=== AFC Women's Futsal Asian Cup ===
| AFC Women's Futsal Asian Cup record | | | | | | | | Qualification record | | | | | | |
| Host nation(s) and year | Round | Pld | W | D | L | GF | GA | Outcome | Pld | W | D | L | GF | GA |
|---|---|---|---|---|---|---|---|---|---|---|---|---|---|---|
| (Malaysia) 2015 | Did not enter | | | | | | | Did not enter | | | | | | |
| (Thailand) 2018 | Group stage | 3 | 1 | 0 | 2 | 4 | 13 | Qualified as invitees | | | | | | |
| (China) 2025 | Did not qualify | | | | | | | 5th of 5 | 4 | 0 | 1 | 3 | 2 | 10 |
| Total | 1/3 | 3 | 1 | 0 | 2 | 4 | 13 | Total | 4 | 0 | 1 | 3 | 2 | 10 |

=== WAFF Women's Futsal Championship ===
WAFF Women's Futsal Championship record
| Host nation(s) and year | Round | Pld | W | D | L | GF | GA |
|---|---|---|---|---|---|---|---|
| (Jordan) 2008 | Group stage | 3 | 1 | 0 | 2 | 10 | 10 |
| (Bahrain) 2012 | Fourth place | 3 | 2 | 1 | 1 | 28 | 8 |
| (Saudi Arabia) 2022 | Did not enter | | | | | | |
| Total | 2/3 | 6 | 3 | 1 | 3 | 38 | 18 |

== Players ==
=== Current squad ===
The following players were called up for the 2025 AFC Women's Futsal Asian Cup qualification.

| No. | Pos. | Player | Date of birth (age) | Club |
|---|---|---|---|---|
| 1 | GK | Elite Tannous | | |
| 2 | FP | Christina Tikle | | |
| 3 | FP | Maria Mansour | | |
| 4 | FP | Riwa Ezzeddine | | |
| 5 | FP | Sasha Bou Sreih | | |
| 6 | FP | Rayane El Rachid | | |
| 7 | FP | Amal Salha | | |
| 8 | FP | Marie Thérèse Tikle | | |
| 9 | FP | Léa Khalil | | |
| 10 | FP | Sophie Fayad | | |
| 11 | FP | Yara Srour | | |
| 12 | GK | Perla Nasr | | |
| 13 | FP | Malak Hoteit | | |
| 14 | FP | Marie Joe Wakim | | |

=== Previous squads ===
AFC Women's Futsal Championship

- 2018 AFC Women's Futsal Championship squads

== See also ==
- Lebanon national futsal team
- Lebanon women's national football team
