= Lung Wing Yan =

Hong Kong footballer

Personal information
- Date of birth: 11 July 1981 (age 45)
- Position: Goalkeeper

International career^{‡}
| Years | Team | Apps | (Gls) |
| 2013–2015 | Hong Kong | 3+ | (0+) |
| 2015–2018 | Hong Kong (futsal) | 4+ | (0+) |
- ‡ National team caps and goals as of 6 May 2018.

Lung Wing Yan (born 11 July 1981) is a Hong Kong footballer who plays as a goalkeeper. She is also a futsal player, and represented Hong Kong internationally in both football and futsal.

== International career ==
Lung Wing Yan has been capped for Hong Kong at senior level in both football and futsal. In football, she represented Hong Kong at the 2014 AFC Women's Asian Cup qualification and the 2016 AFC Women's Olympic Qualifying Tournament.

In futsal, Lung Wing Yan played for Hong Kong at two AFC Women's Futsal Championship editions (2015 and 2018).

== See also ==
- List of Hong Kong women's international footballers
