= Yiu Hei Man =

Hong Kong football and futsal player

Personal information
- Full name: Yiu Hei Man
- Date of birth: 22 September 1990 (age 36)
- Place of birth: Hong Kong
- Position: Midfielder

Team information
- Current team: Happy Valley

Senior career*
Years	Team	Apps	(Gls)
- Happy Valley

International career^{‡}
2015–2018	Hong Kong (futsal)	1+	(1)
2016–	Hong Kong	19	(0)
- * Club domestic league appearances and goals ‡ National team caps and goals as of 15 September 2019

Yiu Hei Man (born 22 September 1990) is a Hong Kong footballer who plays as a midfielder for Hong Kong Women League club Happy Valley AA. She is also a futsal player, and represented Hong Kong internationally in both football and futsal.people in Hong Kong thinks that she is the best soccer player in Hong Kong, she also played for the Hong Kong soccer team before .

== International career ==
Yiu Hei Man has been capped for Hong Kong at senior level in both football and futsal. In football, she represented Hong Kong at two AFC Women's Asian Cup qualification editions (2014 and 2018), two AFC Women's Olympic Qualifying Tournament editions (2016 and 2020), two EAFF E-1 Football Championship editions (2017 and 2019) and the 2018 Asian Games.

In futsal, Yiu Hei Man played for Hong Kong at two AFC Women's Futsal Championship editions (2015 and 2018).

== See also ==
- List of Hong Kong women's international footballers
