= Ng Wing Kum =

Hong Kong footballer

Personal information
- Full name: Ng Wing Kum
- Date of birth: 6 May 1984 (age 42)
- Place of birth: Hong Kong
- Height: 1.76 m (5 ft 9 in)
- Position: Midfielder

Senior career*
Years	Team	Apps	(Gls)
- Citizen

International career^{‡}
2007–2017	Hong Kong	13+	(8+)
2015–2018	Hong Kong (futsal)	3+	(3)
- * Club domestic league appearances and goals ‡ National team caps and goals as of 24 August 2018

Ng Wing Kum (born 6 May 1984) is a Hong Kong retired footballer who played as a midfielder. She is also a former futsal player, and represented Hong Kong internationally in both football and futsal.

== Club career ==
Ng Wing Kum has played for Citizen AA in Hong Kong.

== International career ==
Ng Wing Kum has been capped for Hong Kong at senior level in both football and futsal. In football, she represented Hong Kong at four AFC Women's Asian Cup qualification editions (2008, 2010, 2014 and 2018), three EAFF E-1 Football Championship editions (2010, 2013 and 2017), the 2012 AFC Women's Olympic Qualifying Tournament and the 2014 Asian Games.

In futsal, Ng Wing Kum played for Hong Kong at two AFC Women's Futsal Championship editions (2015 and 2018) and the 2017 Asian Indoor and Martial Arts Games.

== International goals ==
No.	Date	Venue	Opponent	Score	Result	Competition
1.	16 June 2003	Rajamangala Stadium, Bangkok, Thailand	Singapore	1–0	1–0	2003 AFC Women's Championship
2.	17 June 2005	Mỹ Đình National Stadium, Hanoi, Vietnam	Maldives	3–0	4–0	2006 AFC Women's Asian Cup qualification
3.	6 July 2009	Thành Long Sports Centre, Hồ Chí Minh City, Vietnam	Kyrgyzstan	2–0	2–0	2010 AFC Women's Asian Cup qualification
4.	24 August 2009	Tainan County Stadium, Tainan County, Taiwan	Northern Mariana Islands	2–0	10–0	2010 EAFF Women's Football Championship
5.	24 August 2009	Tainan County Stadium, Tainan County, Taiwan	Northern Mariana Islands	4–0	10–0	2010 EAFF Women's Football Championship
6.	30 August 2009	Tainan County Stadium, Tainan County, Taiwan	Guam	1–0	1–0	2010 EAFF Women's Football Championship
7.	19 July 2012	Leo Palace Resort, Yona, Guam	Northern Mariana Islands	1–0	11–0	2013 EAFF Women's East Asian Cup
8.	19 July 2012	Leo Palace Resort, Yona, Guam	Northern Mariana Islands	3–0	11–0	2013 EAFF Women's East Asian Cup
9.	19 July 2012	Leo Palace Resort, Yona, Guam	Northern Mariana Islands	7–0	11–0	2013 EAFF Women's East Asian Cup
10.	19 July 2012	Leo Palace Resort, Yona, Guam	Northern Mariana Islands	9–0	11–0	2013 EAFF Women's East Asian Cup

== See also ==
- List of Hong Kong women's international footballers
