= Heidi Yuen =

Hong Kong football and futsal player

Personal information
- Full name: Heidi Yuen Hoi Dik
- Date of birth: 22 August 1992 (age 34)
- Place of birth: Hong Kong
- Position: Forward

Team information
- Current team: Citizen

Senior career*
Years	Team	Apps	(Gls)
- Citizen

International career^{‡}
2015–2018	Hong Kong (futsal)	1+	(2)
2016–	Hong Kong	14	(1)
- * Club domestic league appearances and goals ‡ National team caps and goals as of 15 September 2019

Heidi Yuen Hoi Dik (born 22 August 1992) is a Hong Kong footballer who plays as a forward for Hong Kong Women League club Citizen AA. She is also a futsal player, and represented Hong Kong internationally in both football and futsal.

== International career ==
Yuen has been capped for Hong Kong at senior level in both football and futsal. In football, she represented Hong Kong at three AFC Women's Olympic Qualifying Tournament editions (2012, 2016 and 2020), two AFC Women's Asian Cup qualification editions (2014 and 2018), two EAFF E-1 Football Championship editions (2017 and 2019) and the 2018 Asian Games.

In futsal, Yuen played for Hong Kong at two AFC Women's Futsal Championship editions (2015 and 2018).

== International goals ==
No.	Date	Venue	Opponent	Score	Result	Competition
1.	22 August 2018	Bumi Sriwijaya Stadium, Palembang, Indonesia	Tajikistan	2–0	6–1	2018 Asian Games

== See also ==
- List of Hong Kong women's international footballers
