= Cheung Wai Ki =

Hong Kong professional footballer

Cheung Wai Ki 張煒琪
Personal information
- Full name: Cheung Wai Ki
- Date of birth: 22 November 1990 (age 35)
- Place of birth: Hong Kong
- Height: 1.77 m (5 ft 10 in)
- Position: Midfielder

Youth career
- Hong Kong Rangers

Senior career*
Years	Team	Apps	(Gls)
2014–2015	Citizen	8	(31)
2017–2018	Brisbane Roar	10	(0)
2018–2021	Citizen	27	(34)
2021–	Kitchee	58	(73)

International career
2009–	Hong Kong	37	(22)
2013–	Hong Kong (futsal)	10	(7)
- * Club domestic league appearances and goals

Cheung Wai Ki (born 22 November 1990) is a Hong Kong professional football player who plays as a midfielder for Kitchee in the Hong Kong Women League. She also represents Hong Kong internationally in both football and futsal.

== Club career ==
=== Citizen ===
After being in the Hong Kong Rangers youth system, Cheung helped Citizen win their 3rd Hong Kong Women League title in the 2014–15 season, and was the league's top scorer with 31 goals.

=== Brisbane Roar ===
In September 2017, Cheung signed a one-year deal with Brisbane Roar for the 2017–18 W-League season. She made her debut in the first round, playing the full match in a 3–1 victory over Sydney FC and providing the cross for Brisbane Roar's second goal of the match. In her second match, on 5 November 2017, she was involved in Brisbane Roar's only goal in a 4–1 loss to Perth Glory, but in the end the goal was officially credited to Clare Polkinghorne who headed it after it came off Cheung's back. At the end her contract, after playing 10 matches, Cheung was not re-signed by Brisbane Roar and left the club.

== International career ==
=== Football ===
In August 2009, Cheung played for Hong Kong in the Semi-Final competition of the 2010 EAFF Women's Football Championship. She started in the 8–1 loss to Chinese Taipei and the 10–0 victory over Northern Mariana Islands, scoring a brace against the latter. She was then brought on as a substitute in the 7–0 loss to South Korea and started in the 1–0 victory over Guam.

In July 2012, Cheung played for Hong Kong in the 1st preliminary round of the 2013 EAFF Women's East Asian Cup in the 11–0 victory over Northern Mariana Islands and in the 4–3 victory over Guam, scoring the first goal of the match against the latter. At the conclusion of the round she won the Most Valuable Player award for the round. Four months later, she played for Hong Kong in the 2nd preliminary round of the tournament in the 6–0, 4–0, and 2–1 losses to China, Australia, and Chinese Taipei, respectively.

In May 2013, Cheung played in Hong Kong's squad for the 2014 AFC Women's Asian Cup qualification tournament. She scored both goals in Hong Kong's 2–1 victory over Kyrgyzstan and was named player of the match. She also scored a goal in the 3–1 victory over Bahrain and scored an own goal in the 4–0 loss to Vietnam.

In November 2014, Cheung played for Hong Kong in the 2nd preliminary round of the 2015 EAFF Women's East Asian Cup, starting all 3 matches which Hong Kong lost 2–0 to Chinese Taipei, 9–0 to South Korea and beat Guam 3–0.

Cheung was in Hong Kong's squad to compete in the football at the 2014 Asian Games.

In November 2016, Cheung was selected for Hong Kong's squad in the 2nd preliminary round of the 2017 EAFF E-1 Football Championship. She played in the 5–0 loss to Chinese Taipei and in the 14–0 loss to South Korea, scoring an own goal against the latter. She also played and scored the only goal in the 1–0 victory over Guam.

In April 2017, Cheung played in Hong Kong's squad for the 2018 AFC Women's Asian Cup qualification tournament. She scored the only goal for Hong Kong in the group, in the 2–1 loss to Uzbekistan. She also started for Hong Kong in the 5–0 loss to North Korea, in the 6–0 loss to South Korea, and in the 2–0 loss to India.

In November 2018, Cheung represented Hong Kong in the first round of the 2020 AFC Women's Olympic Qualifying Tournament. She scored Hong Kong's first goal in the 4–0 victory over Lebanon and started in the 1–1 draw with Iran. In both matches she was the player of the match.

In December 2018, Cheung was selected for Hong Kong's squad in the 2nd preliminary round of the 2019 EAFF E-1 Football Championship. She started in the 2–0 loss to Chinese Taipei, in the 6–0 loss to China, and in the 3–0 victory over Mongolia, in which she scored the last goal which was considered one of the nicest of the tournament.

In April 2019, Cheung represented Hong Kong in the second round of the 2020 AFC Women's Olympic Qualifying Tournament. She started for Hong Kong in the 0–0 draw with Jordan, in the 2–1 loss to Vietnam, and in the 5–1 loss to Uzbekistan scoring Hong Kong's only goal in the match.

In February 2020, Cheung was called up for Hong Kong's squad for the 2020 Turkish Women's Cup. She played in the 4–1 loss to Romania.

=== Futsal ===
In June 2013, Cheung represented Hong Kong in futsal at the 2013 Asian Indoor and Martial Arts Games. She scored Hong Kong's only goal in the 2–1 loss to Vietnam and a brace in the 6–4 victory over Malaysia. She also played in the 5–1 loss to Thailand and the 6–0 loss to Iran.

In September 2017, Cheung represented Hong Kong in futsal at the 2017 Asian Indoor and Martial Arts Games. She played in the 6–1 victory over Turkmenistan, scored both goals in the 3–2 loss to Japan, and played in the 5–1 loss to China.

In May 2018, Cheung represented Hong Kong at the 2018 AFC Women's Futsal Championship and was named one of the five star players to look out for prior to the beginning of the tournament. She played in the 2–0 loss to Indonesia, scored 2 goals in the 7–0 victory over Macau, and played in the 8–0 loss to Thailand.

== Career statistics ==
=== International goals ===
Scores and results list Hong Kong's goal tally first, score column indicates score after each Cheung goal.

International goals by date, venue, opponent, score, result and competition
#	Date	Venue	Opponent	Score	Result	Competition	Ref.
1	24 August 2009	Tainan County Stadium, Tainan, Taiwan	Northern Mariana Islands	3–0	10–0	2010 EAFF Women's Football Championship	
2	24 August 2009	Tainan County Stadium, Tainan, Taiwan	Northern Mariana Islands	5–0	10–0	2010 EAFF Women's Football Championship	
3	21 July 2012	Leo Palace Resort, Yona, Guam	Guam	1–0	4–3	2013 EAFF Women's East Asian Cup	
4	22 May 2013	Bahrain National Stadium, Riffa, Bahrain	Kyrgyzstan	1–0	2–1	2014 AFC Women's Asian Cup qualification	
5	22 May 2013	Bahrain National Stadium, Riffa, Bahrain	Kyrgyzstan	2–1	2–1	2014 AFC Women's Asian Cup qualification	
6	24 May 2013	Bahrain National Stadium, Riffa, Bahrain	Bahrain	1–1	3–1	2014 AFC Women's Asian Cup qualification	
7	14 November 2016	Hong Kong Football Club Stadium, Happy Valley, Hong Kong	Guam	1–0	1–0	2017 EAFF E-1 Football Championship	
8	3 April 2017	Kim Il-sung Stadium, Pyongyang, North Korea	Uzbekistan	1–1	1–2	2018 AFC Women's Asian Cup qualification	
9	11 November 2018	IPE Chonburi Stadium 1, Chonburi, Thailand	Lebanon	1–0	4–0	2020 AFC Women's Olympic Qualifying Tournament	
10	5 December 2018	GFA National Training Center, Dededo, Guam	Mongolia	3–0	3–0	2019 EAFF E-1 Football Championship	
11	21 January 2019	Hong Kong	India	1–1	2–5	Friendly	
12	9 April 2019	Lokomotiv Stadium, Tashkent, Uzbekistan	Uzbekistan	1–3	1–5	2020 AFC Women's Olympic Qualifying Tournament	
13	15 September 2019	Tseung Kwan O Sports Ground, Tseung Kwan O, Hong Kong	Philippines	1–0	1–1	Friendly	
14	22 September 2023	Wenzhou Sports Center Stadium, Wenzhou, China	Philippines	1–1	1–3	2022 Asian Games	
15.	2 December 2023	Suoka Sports Training Base Pitch 2, Zhuhai, China	Northern Mariana Islands	3–0	6–1	2024 EAFF E-1 Football Championship	
16.	2 December 2023	Suoka Sports Training Base Pitch 2, Zhuhai, China	Northern Mariana Islands	5–1	6–1	2024 EAFF E-1 Football Championship	
17.	4 December 2023	Suoka Sports Training Base Pitch 1, Zhuhai, China	Mongolia	1–0	6–0	2024 EAFF E-1 Football Championship	
18.	4 December 2023	Suoka Sports Training Base Pitch 1, Zhuhai, China	Mongolia	5–0	6–0	2024 EAFF E-1 Football Championship	
19.	6 December 2023	Suoka Sports Training Base Pitch 2, Zhuhai, China	Guam	1–1	1–1 (4–2 p)	2024 EAFF E-1 Football Championship	
20.	22 October 2025	Jockey Club HKFA Football Training Centre, Tseung Kwan O, Hong Kong	Malaysia	1–0	3–2	Friendly	
21	6 June 2026	Kai Tak Youth Sports Ground, Kowloon, Hong Kong	Fiji	1–1	3–1	Friendly	
22.	14 September 2026	Gifu Nagaragawa Stadium, Gifu, Japan	China	1–1	1–5	2026 Asian Games	

=== Futsal ===
No.	Date	Venue	Opponent	Score	Result	Competition
1.	27 June 2013	Incheon, South Korea	Vietnam	1–0	1–2	2013 Asian Indoor and Martial Arts Games
2.	28 June 2013	Incheon, South Korea	Malaysia	3–0	6–4	2013 Asian Indoor and Martial Arts Games
3.	28 June 2013	Incheon, South Korea	Malaysia	4–1	6–4	2013 Asian Indoor and Martial Arts Games
4.	17 September 2017	Ashgabat, Turkmenistan	Japan	1–3	2–3	2017 Asian Indoor and Martial Arts Games
5.	17 September 2017	Ashgabat, Turkmenistan	Japan	2–3	2–3	2017 Asian Indoor and Martial Arts Games
6.	4 May 2018	Bangkok, Thailand	Macau	5–0	7–0	2018 AFC Women's Futsal Championship
7.	4 May 2018	Bangkok, Thailand	Macau	6–0	7–0	2018 AFC Women's Futsal Championship
8.	15 January 2025	Yogyakarta, Indonesia	India	1–0	5–0	2025 AFC Women's Futsal Asian Cup qualification
9.	15 January 2025	Yogyakarta, Indonesia	India	2–0	5–0	2025 AFC Women's Futsal Asian Cup qualification
10.	15 January 2025	Yogyakarta, Indonesia	India	5–0	5–0	2025 AFC Women's Futsal Asian Cup qualification
11.	17 January 2025	Yogyakarta, Indonesia	Kyrgyzstan	1–0	4–0	2025 AFC Women's Futsal Asian Cup qualification
12.	17 January 2025	Yogyakarta, Indonesia	Kyrgyzstan	3–0	4–0	2025 AFC Women's Futsal Asian Cup qualification
13.	11 May 2025	Hohhot, China	Philippines	3–1	7–3	2025 AFC Women's Futsal Asian Cup

== Honours ==
=== Individual ===
- Hong Kong Women's Footballer of the Year: 2023, 2024

== See also ==
- List of Hong Kong women's international footballers
