= 2025 AFC Women's Futsal Asian Cup =

International futsal competition

2025年亚足联女子五人制足球亚洲杯 (Chinese)

Tournament details
- Host country: China
- Dates: 6–17 May
- Teams: 12 (from 1 confederation)
- Venue: 1 (in 1 host city)

Final positions
- Champions: Japan (1st title)
- Runners-up: Thailand
- Third place: Iran
- Fourth place: China

Tournament statistics
- Matches played: 26
- Goals scored: 119 (4.58 per match)
- Attendance: 16,605 (639 per match)
- Top scorer(s): (Iran) Maral Torkaman (6 goals)
- Best player: (Japan) Sara Oino
- Best goalkeeper: (Japan) Nene Inoue
- Fair play award: China

The 2025 AFC Women's Futsal Asian Cup was the third edition of the AFC Women's Futsal Asian Cup, the quadrennial international futsal championship organised by the Asian Football Confederation (AFC) for the women's national teams of Asia. The tournament was held between 6 and 17 May 2025 in Hohhot, Inner Mongolia, China.

Iran were the two-time defending champions, but were eliminated by Japan in the semi-finals. Japan went on to win their maiden title after beating Thailand on penalties in the final.

The tournament served as the qualifying for the inaugural 2025 FIFA Futsal Women's World Cup in the Philippines.

== Host selection ==
The following three football associations submitted their interest to host the tournament by the deadline.

- China
- Indonesia
- Uzbekistan

On 13 September 2024, the AFC Executive Committee ratified the AFC Futsal & Beach Soccer Committee's decisions to award the hosting rights of the 2025 AFC Women's Futsal Asian Cup to the Chinese Football Association.

== Qualification ==
The host country and the top two teams of the previous tournament in 2018 AFC Women's Futsal Championship qualified automatically, while the other nine teams were determined by qualification matches played in January 2025.

=== Qualified teams ===
The following twelve teams qualified for the tournament:

Team	Method of qualification	Date of qualification	Finals appearance	Last appearance	Previous best performance
China	Hosts	13 September 2024	3rd	2018	Quarter-finals (2018)
Iran	2018 champions	30 August 2024	3rd	2018	Champions (2015, 2018)
Japan	2018 runners-up	30 August 2024	3rd	2018	Runners-up (2015, 2018)
Thailand	Group A winners	17 January 2025	3rd	2018	Third place (2015, 2018)
Indonesia	Group B winners	17 January 2025	2nd	2018	Quarter-finals (2018)
Australia	Group C winners	17 January 2025	1st	N/A	N/A (Debut)
Vietnam	Group D winners	17 January 2025	3rd	2018	Fourth place (2018)
Bahrain	Group A runners-up	19 January 2025	2nd	2018	Group stage (2018)
Hong Kong	Group B runners-up	17 January 2025	3rd	2018	Group stage (2015, 2018)
Uzbekistan	Group C runners-up	19 January 2025	3rd	2018	Quarter-finals (2018)
Chinese Taipei	Group D runners-up	17 January 2025	2nd	2018	Quarter-finals (2018)
Philippines	Best third-placed team	17 January 2025	1st	N/A	N/A (Debut)

=== Draw ===
The draw was held on 6 February 2025 at the Juva Grand Hotel in Hohhot, China.

The 12 teams were drawn into three groups of four teams, with seeding based on their FIFA Futsal World Ranking as of October 2024, which are shown in parentheses except for the team who is unranked, which are denoted by (–). As hosts, China were automatically seeded into pot 1.

Pot 1	Pot 2	Pot 3	Pot 4
China (26; hosts); Thailand (6); Iran (9)	Japan (10); Vietnam (11); Uzbekistan (18)	Indonesia (24); Chinese Taipei (25); Hong Kong (31)	Bahrain (36); Philippines (59); Australia (–)

== Venues ==
The matches were played at the Hohhot Sports Center in Hohhot, Inner Mongolia.

== Match officials ==
AFC appointed the following 20 futsal referees to officiate the tournament.

Referees

- (China) Liang Qingyun
- (China) Zhu Xin
- (Chinese Taipei) Lee Po-fu
- (Indonesia) Wahyu Wicaksono
- (Iran) Gelareh Nazemi
- (Iran) Zahra Rahimi
- (Iran) Fathi Zari
- (Japan) Kumi Hiruma
- (Japan) Kana Saito
- (Japan) Mari Yamamoto
- (South Korea) Moon Dae-sung
- (Lebanon) Nour Chaito
- (Malaysia) Nurul Atikah Janah
- (Malaysia) Muhamad Faiz Jamaluddin
- (Oman) Maryam Al-Hadhrami
- (Saudi Arabia) Reem Al-Bishi
- (Thailand) Panadda Khotsenaphattra
- (United Arab Emirates) Najat Al-Blooshi
- (Uzbekistan) Nikita Afinogenov
- (Vietnam) Huỳnh Nguyên Thành

== Squads ==
Each team must register a final squad of 14 players, including at least two goalkeepers, no later than 10 days before the first match of the tournament (Regulations Articles 26.3).

== Group stage ==
=== Tiebreakers ===
Teams were ranked according to points (3 points for a win, 1 point for a draw, 0 points for a loss), and if tied on points, the following tiebreaking criteria were applied, in the order given, to determine the rankings (Regulations Article 7.3):

1. Points in head-to-head matches among tied teams;
2. Goal difference in head-to-head matches among tied teams;
3. Goals scored in head-to-head matches among tied teams;
4. If more than two teams were tied, and after applying all head-to-head criteria above, a subset of teams were still tied, all head-to-head criteria above were reapplied exclusively to this subset of teams;
5. Goal difference in all group matches;
6. Goals scored in all group matches;
7. Penalty shoot-out if only two teams were tied and they met in the last round of the group;
8. Disciplinary points (yellow card = 1 point, red card as a result of two yellow cards = 3 points, direct red card = 3 points, yellow card followed by direct red card = 4 points);
9. Drawing of lots.

=== Group A ===
Pos	Team	Pld	W	D	L	GF	GA	GD	Pts	Qualification
1	China (H)	3	3	0	0	11	5	+6	9	Advance to knockout stage
2	Chinese Taipei	3	2	0	1	10	6	+4	6	Advance to knockout stage
3	Uzbekistan	3	1	0	2	5	10	−5	3	
4	Australia	3	0	0	3	2	7	−5	0	

Source: AFC
Rules for classification: Tiebreakers
(H) Hosts
6 May 2025
17:00

Uzbekistan	1–6	Chinese Taipei
Turdiboeva 2'16"	Report	Su Hui-chi 3'29", 22'51"; Liu Chih-ling 15'52"; Chen Min-huang 19'43"; Liu Wen-ling 31'46", 33'28"

Hohhot Sports Centre, Hohhot
Attendance: 286
Referee: Mari Yamamoto (Japan) & Nurul Atikah Janah (Malaysia)
6 May 2025
20:00

China	3–1	Australia
Zhan Huimin 13'52"; Su Jiahong 19'25"; Zou Yinglan 36'40"	Report	Karrys-Stahl 33'41"

Hohhot Sports Centre, Hohhot
Attendance: 1,792
Referee: Kumi Hiruma (Japan) & Kana Saito (Japan)

8 May 2025
17:00

Australia	1–3	Uzbekistan
Arrowsmith 10'38"	Report	Amirova 13'15"; Valikhanova 23'38"; Tosheva 27'43"

Hohhot Sports Centre, Hohhot
Attendance: 195
Referee: Reem Al-Bishi (Saudi Arabia) & Najat Al-Blooshi (United Arab Emirates)
8 May 2025
20:00

Chinese Taipei	3–5	China
Chu Fang-yi 24'04"; Liu Wen-ling 36'56", 39'27"	Report	Zhang Rui 4'30"; Cao Jiayi 12'16"; Chen Ya-chun 31'56" (o.g.); Liu Danping 35'05"; Zou Yinglan 37'41"

Hohhot Sports Centre, Hohhot
Attendance: 1,749
Referee: Zahra Rahimi (Iran) & Gelareh Nazemi (Iran)

10 May 2025
17:00

Chinese Taipei	1–0	Australia
Liu Chih-ling 36'04"	Report

Hohhot Sports Centre, Hohhot
Attendance: 275
Referee: Maryam Al-Hadhrami (Oman) & Fathi Zari (Iran)
10 May 2025
20:00

China	3–1	Uzbekistan
Ke Yaoxiang 12'08", 37'45"; Zhan Zewen 32'21"	Report	Vokhidova 12'27"

Hohhot Sports Centre, Hohhot
Attendance: 2,285
Referee: Nurul Atikah Janah (Malaysia) & Mari Yamamoto (Japan)

=== Group B ===
Pos	Team	Pld	W	D	L	GF	GA	GD	Pts	Qualification
1	Vietnam	3	2	1	0	8	3	+5	7	Advance to knockout stage
2	Iran	3	2	1	0	4	1	+3	7	Advance to knockout stage
3	Hong Kong	3	1	0	2	11	11	0	3	Advance to knockout stage
4	Philippines	3	0	0	3	3	11	−8	0	

Source: AFC
Rules for classification: Tiebreakers
7 May 2025
11:00

Iran	1–0	Philippines
Torkaman 37'01"	Report

Hohhot Sports Centre, Hohhot
Attendance: 117
Referee: Liang Qingyun (China) & Zhu Xin (China)
7 May 2025
17:00

Vietnam	5–3	Hong Kong
Chan Wing Sze 12'40" (o.g.); Lê Thị Thanh Ngân 12'48", 31'35"; Trần Thị Thu Xuân 19'25"; Trần Nguyệt Vi 30'50"	Report	Poon Ka Ka 15'04"; Wu Choi Yiu 20'15"; So Hoi Lam 22'31"

Hohhot Sports Centre, Hohhot
Attendance: 182
Referee: Panadda Khotsenaphattra (Thailand) & Nour Chaito (Lebanon)

9 May 2025
11:00

Philippines	0–3	Vietnam
	Report	Trịnh Nguyễn Thanh Hằng 21'34"; Trần Thị Thu Xuân 32'59"; Lê Thị Thanh Ngân 39'09" (2pen.)

Hohhot Sports Centre, Hohhot
Attendance: 280
Referee: Nour Chaito (Lebanon) & Panadda Khotsenaphattra (Thailand)
9 May 2025
17:00

Hong Kong	1–3	Iran
Moghimidarzi 11'14" (o.g.)	Report	Anafjeh 8'50", 36'36"; Banaei 26'32"

Hohhot Sports Centre, Hohhot
Attendance: 117
Referee: Kana Saito (Japan) & Kumi Hiruma (Japan)

11 May 2025
11:00

Hong Kong	7–3	Philippines
So Hoi Lam 13'58", 33'31"; Charis Kung Yuet 16'14", 25'26"; Cheung Wai Ki 24'42"; Wu Choi Yiu 32'53", 34'04"	Report	Tolentin 12'58"; Del Campo 32'25"; Bandoja 36'33"

Hohhot Sports Centre, Hohhot
Attendance: 224
Referee: Mari Yamamoto (Japan) & Nurul Atikah Janah (Malaysia)
11 May 2025
17:00

Iran	0–0	Vietnam
	Report

Hohhot Sports Centre, Hohhot
Attendance: 216
Referee: Reem Al-Bishi (Saudi Arabia) & Najat Al-Blooshi (United Arab Emirates)

=== Group C ===
Pos	Team	Pld	W	D	L	GF	GA	GD	Pts	Qualification
1	Thailand	3	2	1	0	7	1	+6	7	Advance to knockout stage
2	Japan	3	2	0	1	9	7	+2	6	Advance to knockout stage
3	Indonesia	3	1	1	1	7	6	+1	4	Advance to knockout stage
4	Bahrain	3	0	0	3	3	12	−9	0	

Source: AFC
Rules for classification: Tiebreakers
7 May 2025
14:00

Thailand	4–0	Bahrain
Sasikarn 6'47"; Jenjira 24'56"; Patitta 25'15"; Darika 30'59"	Report

Hohhot Sports Centre, Hohhot
Attendance: 187
Referee: Fathi Zari (Iran) & Maryam Al-Hadhrami (Oman)
7 May 2025
20:00

Japan	5–2	Indonesia
Ikadai 1'37"; Egawa 11'48"; Miyahara 13'01", 27'04"; Yotsui 16'26"	Report	Inoue 27'13" (o.g.); Dinar 28'35"

Hohhot Sports Centre, Hohhot
Attendance: 275
Referee: Gelareh Nazemi (Iran) & Zahra Rahimi (Iran)

9 May 2025
14:00

Bahrain	2–3	Japan
Yaqoob 30'07"; Al-Isa 35'55" (2pen.)	Report	Egawa 5'05", 5'44"; Yotsui 10'58"

Hohhot Sports Centre, Hohhot
Attendance: 234
Referee: Najat Al-Blooshi (United Arab Emirates) & Reem Al-Bishi (Saudi Arabia)
9 May 2025
20:00

Indonesia	0–0	Thailand
	Report

Hohhot Sports Centre, Hohhot
Attendance: 228
Referee: Zhu Xin (China) & Liang Qingyun (China)

11 May 2025
14:00

Indonesia	5–1	Bahrain
Ikeu 1'42", 20'12"; Fitri 29'37"; Yaqoob 33'29" (o.g.); Insyafadya 36'31"	Report	Sowar 39'51"

Hohhot Sports Centre, Hohhot
Attendance: 110
Referee: Liang Qingyun (China) & Zhu Xin (China)
11 May 2025
20:00

Thailand	3–1	Japan
Amishiro 25'49" (o.g.); Paerploy 28'03", 32'41"	Report	Amishiro 25'19"

Hohhot Sports Centre, Hohhot
Attendance: 414
Referee: Gelareh Nazemi (Iran) & Zahra Rahimi (Iran)

=== Ranking of third-placed teams ===
Pos	Grp	Team	Pld	W	D	L	GF	GA	GD	Pts	Qualification
1	C	Indonesia	3	1	1	1	7	6	+1	4	Advance to knockout stage
2	B	Hong Kong	3	1	0	2	11	11	0	3	Advance to knockout stage
3	A	Uzbekistan	3	1	0	2	5	10	−5	3	

Source: AFC
Rules for classification: Tiebreakers

== Knockout stage ==
In the knockout stage, extra time and penalty shoot-out were used to decide the winner if necessary, except for the third place match where penalty shoot-out without extra time was used to decide the winners if necessary (Regulations Article 10).

=== Bracket ===
Quarter-finals
13 May – Hohhot
China	6
Indonesia	0
13 May – Hohhot
Thailand	5
Hong Kong	2
13 May – Hohhot
Vietnam	0
Japan	2
13 May – Hohhot
Chinese Taipei	1
Iran (a.e.t.)	3

Semi-finals
15 May – Hohhot
China	2
Thailand	3
15 May – Hohhot
Japan	3
Iran	2

Final
17 May – Hohhot
Thailand	3 (2)
Japan (p)	3 (3)
Third place play-off
17 May – Hohhot
China	1
Iran	3

=== Quarter-finals ===
13 May 2025
11:00

Vietnam	0–2	Japan
	Report	Nguyễn Phương Anh 2'43" (o.g.); Egawa 23'52"

Hohhot Sports Centre, Hohhot
Attendance: 168
Referee: Zhu Xin (China) & Liang Qingyun (China)

13 May 2025
14:00

Thailand	5–2	Hong Kong
Paerploy 2'57"; Jenjira 8'36", 9'35"; Nattamon 13'44"; Darika 14'46" (pen.)	Report	Wu Choi Yiu 19'36"; So Hoi Lam 36'22"

Hohhot Sports Centre, Hohhot
Attendance: 135
Referee: Reem Al-Bishi (Saudi Arabia) & Najat Al-Blooshi (United Arab Emirates)

13 May 2025
17:00

China	6–0	Indonesia
Zhan Zewen 12'33"; Fan Yuqiu 21'59"; Zhang Rui 24'34"; Jiang Xiaoyu 35'15"; Yu Ting 35'22"; Xiong Jing 37'09"	Report

Hohhot Sports Centre, Hohhot
Attendance: 1,085
Referee: Mari Yamamoto (Japan) & Saito Kana (Japan)

13 May 2025
20:00

Chinese Taipei	1–3 (a.e.t.)	Iran
Liu Wen-ling 17'41"	Report	Torkaman 1'32" (pen.); Khosravi 48'45"; Tavasoli 49'47"

Hohhot Sports Centre, Hohhot
Attendance: 273
Referee: Nurul Atikah Janah (Malaysia) & Panadda Khotsenaphattra (Thailand)

=== Semi-finals ===
The winners qualified for the 2025 FIFA Futsal Women's World Cup.

15 May 2025
17:00

China	2–3	Thailand
Fan Yuqiu 15'25"; Cao Jiayi 15'47"	Report	Hataichanok 10'52"; Jenjira 26'00" (pen.); Zhan Huimin 31'15" (o.g.)

Hohhot Sports Centre, Hohhot
Attendance: 1,553
Referee: Fathi Zari (Iran) & Kana Saito (Japan)

15 May 2025
20:00

Japan	3–2	Iran
Ikadai 2'10"; Takahashi 3'32"; Miyahara 29'19"	Report	Torkaman 23'19", 31'23"

Hohhot Sports Centre, Hohhot
Attendance: 418
Referee: Zhu Xin (China) & Panadda Khotsenaphattra (Thailand)

=== Third place match ===
The winner qualified for the 2025 FIFA Futsal Women's World Cup.

17 May 2025
17:00

China	1–3	Iran
Cao Jiayi 20'57"	Report	Torkaman 15'10", 39'37"; Mehdi Pour 29'16"

Hohhot Sports Centre, Hohhot
Attendance: 2,013
Referee: Nurul Atikah Janah (Malaysia) & Mari Yamamoto (Japan)

=== Final ===
17 May 2025
20:00

Thailand	3–3 (a.e.t.)	Japan
Jenjira 8'41"; Nattamon 24'16"; Paerploy 42'14"	Report	Oino 4'11"; Takahashi 20'52"; Miyahara 43'48"
Penalties
Darika (penalty missed); Jenjira (penalty scored); Sangrawee (penalty missed); Paerploy (penalty scored); Hataichanok (penalty missed)	2–3	(penalty missed) Eguchi; (penalty scored) Amishiro; (penalty scored) Miyahara; (penalty scored) Takahashi

Hohhot Sports Centre, Hohhot
Attendance: 1,794
Referee: Liang Qingyun (China) & Zhu Xin (China)

== Goalscorers ==
There were 119 goals scored in 26 matches, for an average of 4.58 goals per match.

6 goals

- (Iran) Maral Torkaman

5 goals

- (Thailand) Jenjira Bubpha
- (Chinese Taipei) Liu Wen-ling

4 goals

- (Hong Kong) So Hoi Lam
- (Hong Kong) Wu Choi Yiu
- (Japan) Ryo Egawa
- (Japan) Yukari Miyahara
- (Thailand) Paerploy Huajaipetch

3 goals

- (China) Cao Jiayi
- (Vietnam) Lê Thị Thanh Ngân

2 goals

- (China) Fan Yuqiu
- (China) Ke Yaoxiang
- (China) Zhan Zewen
- (China) Zhang Rui
- (China) Zou Yinglan
- (Chinese Taipei) Liu Chih-ling
- (Chinese Taipei) Su Hui-chi
- (Hong Kong) Charis Kung Yuet
- (Indonesia) Ikeu Rosita
- (Iran) Elham Anafjeh
- (Japan) Risa Ikadai
- (Japan) Kyoka Takahashi
- (Japan) Saki Yotsui
- (Thailand) Nattamon Artkla
- (Thailand) Darika Peanpailun
- (Vietnam) Trần Thị Thu Xuân

1 goal

- (Australia) Daisy Arrowsmith
- (Australia) Alexia Karrys-Stahl
- (Bahrain) Hessa Al-Isa
- (Bahrain) Amira Sowar
- (Bahrain) Manar Yaqoob
- (China) Jiang Xiaoyu
- (China) Liu Danping
- (China) Su Jiahong
- (China) Xiong Jing
- (China) Yu Ting
- (China) Zhan Huimin
- (Chinese Taipei) Chen Min-huang
- (Chinese Taipei) Chu Fang-yi
- (Hong Kong) Cheung Wai Ki
- (Hong Kong) Poon Ka Ka
- (Indonesia) Fitri Rosdiana
- (Indonesia) Insyafadya Salsabillah
- (Indonesia) Dinar Kartika Sari
- (Iran) Mahtab Banaei
- (Iran) Fereshteh Khosravi
- (Iran) Tahereh Mehdi Pour
- (Iran) Farzaneh Tavasoli
- (Japan) Anna Amishiro
- (Japan) Sara Oino
- (Philippines) Isabella Bandoja
- (Philippines) Alisha del Campo
- (Philippines) Dionesa Tolentin
- (Thailand) Patitta Moolpho
- (Thailand) Hataichanok Tappakun
- (Thailand) Sasikarn Tongdee
- (Uzbekistan) Gulzoda Amirova
- (Uzbekistan) Shodiya Tosheva
- (Uzbekistan) Feruza Turdiboeva
- (Uzbekistan) Omina Valikhanova
- (Uzbekistan) Madina Vokhidova
- (Vietnam) Trần Nguyệt Vi
- (Vietnam) Trịnh Nguyễn Thanh Hằng

1 own goal

- (Bahrain) Manar Yaqoob (against Indonesia)
- (China) Zhan Huimin (against Thailand)
- (Chinese Taipei) Chen Ya-chun (against China)
- (Hong Kong) Chan Wing Sze (against Vietnam)
- (Iran) Nastaran Moghimi (against Hong Kong)
- (Japan) Anna Amishiro (against Thailand)
- (Japan) Nene Inoue (against Indonesia)
- (Vietnam) Nguyễn Phương Anh (against Japan)

== Qualified teams for the 2025 FIFA Futsal Women's World Cup ==
As the host nation, the Philippines had secured their place in the World Cup regardless of their results in the Asian Cup.

Should the Philippines advance to the semi-finals, the other semi-finalists would have automatically qualify. However, the Philippines did not reach the semi-finals, so the top three teams—the winners, runners-up, and third-place team—secured qualification for the 2025 FIFA Futsal Women's World Cup.

The following four teams from AFC were qualified for the tournament.

Team	Qualified on
Philippines	15 May 2024
Thailand	15 May 2025
Japan	15 May 2025
Iran	17 May 2025

== Ranking ==
Rank	Team	M	W	D	L	GF	GA	GD	Points
1	Japan	6	4	1	1	17	12	+5	13
2	Thailand	6	4	2	0	18	8	+10	14
3	Iran	6	4	1	1	12	6	+6	13
4	China	6	4	0	2	20	11	+9	12
5	Vietnam	4	2	1	1	8	5	+3	7
6	Chinese Taipei	4	2	0	2	11	9	+2	6
7	Indonesia	4	1	1	2	7	12	-5	4
8	Hong Kong	4	1	0	3	13	16	-3	3
9	Uzbekistan	3	1	0	2	5	10	-5	3
10	Australia	3	0	0	3	2	7	-5	0
11	Philippines	3	0	0	3	3	11	-8	0
12	Bahrain	3	0	0	3	3	12	-9	0
