= 2012 WAFF Women's Futsal Championship =

Tournament details
- Host country: Bahrain
- Dates: 3–12 April
- Teams: 7
- Venue: 1 (in 1 host city)

Final positions
- Champions: Iran (2nd title)
- Runners-up: Jordan
- Third place: Bahrain
- Fourth place: Lebanon

Tournament statistics
- Matches played: 13
- Goals scored: 126 (9.69 per match)
- Top scorer: (Bahrain) Deena Abdelrahman (11)

The 2012 WAFF Women's Futsal Championship was the second women's futsal championship for the West Asian Football Federation. The tournament was played in Bahrain. The draw took place on 2 April 2012 in Manama. Iran won the tournament for the second time.

== Group stage ==
=== Group A ===
Team	Pld	W	D	L	GF	GA	Diff	Pts
Iran	2	2	0	0	19	0	+19	6
Bahrain	2	1	0	1	8	8	0	3
Iraq	2	0	0	2	2	21	−19	0

3 April 2012
18:15

Bahrain	8–2	Iraq
Tobellah 4'; Abdelrahman 6', 8', 23', 38'; Al Hashmi 14', 16'; Yaqoob 37'	Report	Sarhan 21'; Rasheed 35'

Khalifa Sports City

5 April 2012
18:15

Iran	13–0	Iraq
Armat 1'; Ardalan 6', 11'; Eghbali 8', 27'; Etedadi 11', 14'; Zarrinrad 18', 37'; Zarei 24'; Gholami 28', 32', 34'	Report

Khalifa Sports City

7 April 2012
18:15

Iran	6–0	Bahrain
Karim 18'; Etedadi 21'; Zarei 26', 32', 34'; Ardalan 37'	Report

Khalifa Sports City

=== Group B ===
Team	Pld	W	D	L	GF	GA	Diff	Pts
Jordan	3	2	0	1	26	5	+21	6
Lebanon	3	2	0	1	26	6	+20	6
Palestine	3	2	0	1	14	7	+7	6
Qatar	3	0	0	3	0	48	−48	0

4 April 2012
16:00

Jordan	20–0	Qatar
Al Naber 1', 3', 37'; Alazab 2', 22', 37'; Jbarah 9', 10', 23', 29', 35', 38'; Al Nahar 14', 17', 31', 36'; Fakher Elddin 16'; Al Hyasat 21'; Jebreen 31'; Rantisi 39'	Report

Khalifa Sports City
4 April 2012
18:30

Lebanon	5–2	Palestine
Bakri 29'; Haidar 35', 38'; Tchaylian 37', 40'	Report	Alkolayb 20', 38'

Khalifa Sports City

6 April 2012
16:00

Jordan	4–2	Lebanon
Jebreen 4', 19', 31'; Al Naber 36'	Report	Chalhoub 7'; Fakhreddine 34'

Khalifa Sports City
6 April 2012
18:30

Qatar	0–9	Palestine
	Report	Salama 13', 23', 33'; Sohgian 14', 18', 28'; Alkhatib 22'; Abughazala 31'; Albandak 37'

Khalifa Sports City

8 April 2012
16:00

Jordan	2–3	Palestine
Al Naber 14'; Al Nahar 32'	Report	Sohgian 14'; Alkolayb 37', 39'

Khalifa Sports City
8 April 2012
18:30

Lebanon	19–0	Qatar
Tchaylian 1', 18', 20', 22', 33', 34'; Hamadeh 4', 19', 22', 37'; Haidar 4', 7', 9', 20', 22', 25'; El Jaafil 10'; Bakri 14'; Chalhoub 39'	Report

Khalifa Sports City

== Knockout stage ==
Semi-finals
April 10 – Manama
Iran	2 (4)
Lebanon	2 (3)
April 10 – Manama
Jordan	4
Bahrain	1

Final
April 12 – Manama
Iran	8
Jordan	1
Third place
April 12 – Manama
Lebanon	5
Bahrain	8

=== Semi-finals ===
10 April 2012
16:00

Iran	2–2	Lebanon
Eghbali 3'; Etedadi 17'	Report	Chalhoub 5'; Bakri 31'
Penalties
	4–3

Khalifa Sports City

10 April 2012
19:00

Jordan	4–1	Bahrain
Jbarah 9', 29', 32'; Jebreen 33'	Report	Abdelrahman 32'

Khalifa Sports City

=== 3rd-place match ===
12 April 2012
16:00

Lebanon	5–8	Bahrain
Hamadeh 5', 18'; El Jaafil 31'; Dbouk 39'; Haidar 40'	Report	Abdelrahman 2', 8', 14', 23', 33', 38'; Al Hashmi 26', 34'

Khalifa Sports City

=== Final ===
12 April 2012
19:00

Iran	8–1	Jordan
Zarei 4', 28'; Zarrinrad 10'; Armat 12', 24'; Etedadi 16'; Karimi 36'; Moradi 36'	Report	Al Hyasat 13'

Khalifa Sports City

== Awards ==
WAFF Women's Futsal Championship
2012 Champions

Iran
Second Title

- Most Valuable Player
- Top Scorer
  - (Bahrain) Deena Abdelrahman (11 goals)
- Fair-Play Award
