= Liu Jing (footballer, born 1998) =

Chinese footballer

Personal information
- Date of birth: 24 April 1998 (age 28)
- Place of birth: China
- Position: Midfielder

Team information
- Current team: Changchun Jiuyin Loans

Senior career*
Years	Team	Apps	(Gls)
- Changchun Jiuyin Loans

International career
- China
- China (futsal)
- * Club domestic league appearances and goals

Liu Jing is a Chinese professional football player who plays as a midfielder for Changchun Jiuyin Loans. She studied at Beijing Normal University.

== International career ==
As of match played 5 April 2025

Appearances and goals by national team and year
National team	Year	Apps	Goals
China	2018	7	0
China	2021	3	0
China	2024	5	0
China	2025	4	1
Total		19	1

== International goals ==
No.	Date	Venue	Opponent	Score	Result	Competition
1.	5 April 2025	Yongchuan Sports Center, Chongqing, China	Uzbekistan	4–0	5–0	2025 Yongchuan International Tournament
