= Phạm Thị Tươi =

Vietnamese footballer

Personal information
- Date of birth: 26 June 1993 (age 33)
- Place of birth: Thanh Liêm, Hà Nam, Vietnam
- Height: 1.60 m (5 ft 3 in)
- Position: Defender

Team information
- Current team: Phong Phú Hà Nam
- Number: 22

Senior career*
Years	Team	Apps	(Gls)
2007–	Phong Phú Hà Nam	168	(14)

International career^{‡}
2011–	Vietnam	41	(0)
- Vietnam (futsal)
- * Club domestic league appearances and goals ‡ National team caps and goals as of 11 March 2020

Phạm Thị Tươi (born 26 June 1993) is a Vietnamese footballer who plays as a defender for Women's Championship club Phong Phú Hà Nam and the Vietnam women's national team.
