= China women's national futsal team =

China
- Nickname(s): 铿锵玫瑰 Kēngqiāng Méiguī (Steel Roses)
- Association: Chinese Football Association
- Confederation: AFC (Asia)
- Head coach: (China) Hu Jie (胡杰)
- FIFA code: CHN
- FIFA ranking: 15 ▲9 (29 August 2025)

First international
- China 3–0 Malaysia (Incheon, South Korea; 23 June 2013)

Biggest win
- China 12–0 Kuwait (Chengdu, China; 8 September 2019)

Biggest defeat
- Japan 7–1 China (Nilai, Negeri Sembilan, Malaysia; 23 September 2015)

FIFA World Cup
- Appearances: 0

AFC Women's Futsal Championship
- Appearances: 1 (First in 2015)
- Best result: Group stage (2015)

Asian Indoor and Martial Arts Games
- Appearances: 2 (First in 2013)
- Best result: Fourth place (2017)

The China women's national futsal team represents China in international futsal competitions and is controlled by the Chinese Football Association.

== Tournament record ==
=== Futsal at the Asian Indoor and Martial Arts Games ===
Futsal at the Asian Indoor and Martial Arts Games Record
Year	Round	Position	GP	W	D	L	GS	GA
Thailand 2005	Did not participate	-	-	-	-	-	-	-
Macau 2007	Did not participate	-	-	-	-	-	-	-
Vietnam 2009	Did not participate	-	-	-	-	-	-	-
Korea 2013	Group Stage	6/9	3	0	1	2	3	8
Turkmenistan 2017	Fourth place	4/7	5	2	0	3	12	16
Total	Fourth place	2/5	8	2	1	5	15	24

=== AFC Women's Futsal Championship ===
Year	Position	Final Stage						Preliminary Stage					
Year	Position	P	W	D	L	GF	GA	P	W	D	L	GF	GA
(Malaysia) 2015	Group Stage	3	1	0	2	5	12	No qualification					
(Thailand) 2018	Quarter-final	4	2	0	2	17	12	No qualification					
(China) 2025		6	4	0	2	20	11	determined	Qualified as hosts				
Total	Quarter-final	7	3	0	4	22	24	0	0	0	0	0	0

== Recent Matches ==
3 May 2018	China	5–2	Bahrain	Bangkok Arena, Bangkok
15:30	Li Jingjing 3'; Tian Jiao 11'; Zhan Huimin 14'; Li Yingqing 16'; Shen Nan 18'	Report	Al Isa 1'; Yaqoob 15'	Attendance: 50; Referee: Maryam Poor Jafarian (Iran)

5 May 2018	Lebanon	0–6	China	Bangkok Arena, Bangkok
15:30		Report	Li Jingjing 2', 20'; Shen Nan 28', 38'; Zhan Huimin 33'; Tian Jiao 39'	Attendance: 60; Referee: Ridzuan Rozali (Malaysia)

7 May 2018	Japan	6–4	China	Bangkok Arena, Bangkok
15:30	Amishiro 4', 32', 40'; Egawa 7'; Nakajima 38'; Komura 40'	Report	Li Yingqing 20'; Tian Jiao 24'; Wang Ting 39'; Li Jingjing 40'	Attendance: 80; Referee: Maryam Poor Jafarian (Iran)

9 May 2018	Iran	4–2	China	Bangkok Arena, Bangkok
15:00	Karimi 2'; Gholami 16'; Etedadi 21'; Shirbeigi 37'	Report	Tian Jiao 3'; Zhang Yue 9'	Attendance: 80; Referee: Irina Velikanova (Russia)

=== Managers ===
Years	Manager
2013	(Portugal) André Lima
2014-2016	(China) Shan Zhiping
2017	(China) Hu Jie (胡杰)

== See also ==
- China national men's futsal team
- Chinese Futsal League
