= Chu Fang-yi =

Taiwanese footballer

Personal information
- Date of birth: 30 August 1989 (age 37)
- Place of birth: Taipei City, Taiwan
- Height: 1.66 m (5 ft 5 in)
- Position: Goalkeeper

International career^{‡}
Years	Team	Apps	(Gls)
2016–2018	Chinese Taipei	5	(0)
- ‡ National team caps and goals as of 31 August 2018

Chu Fang-yi (born 30 August 1989) is a Taiwanese footballer who plays as a goalkeeper. She has been a member of the Chinese Taipei women's national team.
