= Japan women's national futsal team =

Japan
- Nickname(s): なでしこファイブ (Nadeshiko Five)
- Association: Japan Football Association
- Confederation: AFC (Asia)
- Head coach: Takehiro Suga
- FIFA code: JPN
- FIFA ranking: 6 (24 September 2026)
Home colours	Away colours

First international
- Thailand 2–3 Japan (Macau, China; 27 October 2007)

Biggest win
- Japan 11–2 Philippines (Chiba, Japan; 28 September 2025); Tanzania 0–9 Japan (Pasig, Philippines; 29 November 2025)

Biggest defeat
- Spain 8–0 Japan (Las Rozas, Spain; 10 December 2019); Portugal 8–0 Japan (Entrocamento, Portugal; 2 September 2018)

FIFA Futsal Women's World Cup
- Appearances: 1 (First in 2025)
- Best result: Quarter-finals (2025)

AFC Women's Futsal Asian Cup
- Appearances: 3 (First in 2015)
- Best result: Champions (2025)

Asian Indoor and Martial Arts Games
- Appearances: 3 (First in 2007)
- Best result: Gold medal (2007, 2009, 2013)

The Japan women's national futsal team represents Japan in international women's futsal competitions and is controlled by the Japan Football Association. They are one of the strongest teams in Asia and the champions of the 2007, 2009 and 2013 Asian Indoor Games.

== Results and fixtures ==
Legend

Win Draw Lose Fixture

== Coaching staff ==
=== Current coaching staff ===
As of 23 November 2021

Role	Name
Head coach	(Japan) Takehiro Suga

=== Manager history ===
As of 23 November 2021

Name	Period	Ref.
(Japan) Masanori Ito	20??–2021	
(Japan) Takehiro Suga	2021–	

== Players ==
=== Current squad ===
The final squad for the 2025 AFC Women's Futsal Asian Cup was named on 17 April 2025. Aki Ikeuchi replaced Rio Matsuki on 26 April due to an injury of the latter.

Head coach: Takehiro Suga

No.	Pos.	Player	Date of birth (age)	Club
1	GK	Nene Inoue		(Japan Football Association) Tachikawa Athletic
2	GK	Yuria Suto		(Royal Spanish Football Federation) Torreblanca Melilla
3	FP	Mika Eguchi		(Japan Football Association) Bardral Urayasu
4	FP	Saki Yotsui		(Japan Football Association) SWH Nishinomiya
5	FP	Kaho Ito		(Japan Football Association) Bardral Urayasu
6	FP	Aki Ikeuchi		(Japan Football Association) Bardral Urayasu
7	FP	Sara Oino		(Japan Football Association) SWH Nishinomiya
8	FP	Yukari Miyahara		(Japan Football Association) Bardral Urayasu
9	FP	Ryo Egawa		(Japan Football Association) SWH Nishinomiya
10	FP	Anna Amishiro		(Japan Football Association) SWH Nishinomiya
11	FP	Risa Ikadai		(Japan Football Association) Bardral Urayasu
12	FP	Yuka Iwasaki		(Japan Football Association) Fugador Sumida
13	FP	Kyoka Takahashi		(Japan Football Association) Arco Kobe
14	FP	Naomi Matsumoto		(Japan Football Association) Bardral Urayasu

== Competitive record ==
=== FIFA Futsal Women's World Cup ===
FIFA Futsal Women's World Cup record
Year	Round	Position	Pld	W	D	L	GF	GA
(Philippines) 2025	Quarter-finals	6th	4	2	0	2	17	9
Total	Quarter-finals	1/1	4	2	0	2	17	9

*Draws include knockout matches decided on penalty kicks.

=== Women's Futsal World Tournament ===
Women's Futsal World Tournament record
Year	Round	Pld	W	D	L	GS	GA
(Spain) 2010	1st round	3	1	0	2	4	9
(Brazil) 2011	1st round	3	0	1	2	1	6
(Portugal) 2012	1st round	4	2	0	2	7	14
(Spain) 2013	7th place	3	1	0	2	2	9
(Costa Rica) 2014	6th place	3	1	0	2	3	12
(Guatemala) 2015	8th place	3	0	0	3	3	9
Total	6/6	19	5	1	13	20	59

=== AFC Women's Futsal Asian Cup ===
AFC Women's Futsal Asian Cup record
Year	Round	Position	GP	W	D	L	GS	GA
(Malaysia) 2015	Runner-Up	2/8	5	4	0	1	22	7
(Thailand) 2018	Runner-Up	2/15	6	5	0	1	33	12
(China) 2025	Champions	1/12	6	4	1	1	17	12
Total	Best Finish: Champions		17	13	1	3	72	31

=== Asian Indoor and Martial Arts Games ===
Asian Indoor and Martial Arts Games record

- 2005 – Did not enter
- 2007 – Gold Medal
- 2009 – Gold Medal
- 2013 – Gold Medal
- 2017 – Silver Medal

== See also ==
Women's

- International footballers
- National football team (Results)
- National under-20 football team
- National under-17 football team
- National futsal team

Men's

- International footballers
- National football team (Results (2020–present))
- National under-23 football team
- National under-20 football team
- National under-17 football team
- National futsal team
- National under-20 futsal team
- National beach soccer team
