= SWH Futsal Club =

SWH Futsal Club SWHフットサルクラブ
- Full name: SWH Futsal Club
- Founded: 2003; 22 years ago
- Chairman: Heitaro Watanabe
- Head coach: Yoshitaka Kamikubo
- League: Kansai Futsal League

SWH Futsal Club (SWHフットサルクラブ) is a Japanese professional futsal club, they play in the Kansai Futsal League. The team is located in Ashiya, Hyōgo, Japan.

== See also ==
- Japan Football Association (JFA)
