= 2018 AFC Women's Futsal Championship =

Tournament details
- Host country: Thailand
- City: Bangkok
- Dates: 2–12 May
- Teams: 15 (from 1 confederation)
- Venue: 2 (in 1 host city)

Final positions
- Champions: Iran (2nd title)
- Runners-up: Japan
- Third place: Thailand
- Fourth place: Vietnam

Tournament statistics
- Matches played: 29
- Goals scored: 189 (6.52 per match)
- Attendance: 9,105 (314 per match)
- Top scorer(s): (Iran) Fatemeh Etedadi (Iran) Sara Shirbeigi (Japan) Anna Amishiro (Thailand) Sasicha Phothiwong (9 goals each)
- Best player: (Iran) Fereshteh Karimi
- Fair play award: Iran

The 2018 AFC Women's Futsal Championship was the second edition of the AFC Women's Futsal Championship, the biennial international futsal championship organized by the Asian Football Confederation (AFC) for the women's national teams of Asia. It took place in Thailand, which was appointed as hosts by the AFC on 29 July 2017, between 2 and 12 May 2018. The tournament was originally to be held between 15–26 August 2017, two years after the inaugural edition in 2015, but was postponed to the following year.

A total of 15 teams participated in the tournament. The 15 teams were divided into four groups (one with three teams and three with four teams), with the group winners and the best runner-up advancing to the quarter-finals.

The tournament served as qualifying for the futsal tournament at the 2018 Summer Youth Olympics in Buenos Aires, with the winner and the runner-up qualifying for the girls' tournament, to be represented by their under-18 representative teams.

Iran, the defending champions, won their second title in a row.

== Qualified teams ==
Of the 47 AFC member associations, a total of 15 teams entered the competition. There was no qualification, and all entrants advanced to the final tournament.

| Team | Appearance | Previous best performance |
|---|---|---|
| Thailand (hosts) | 2nd | Third place (2015) |
| Iran | 2nd | Champions (2015) |
| Japan | 2nd | Runners-up (2015) |
| Malaysia | 2nd | Fourth place (2015) |
| China | 2nd | Group stage (2015) |
| Hong Kong | 2nd | Group stage (2015) |
| Uzbekistan | 2nd | Group stage (2015) |
| Vietnam | 2nd | Group stage (2015) |
| Bahrain | 1st | Debut |
| Chinese Taipei | 1st | Debut |
| Lebanon | 1st | Debut |
| Macau | 1st | Debut |
| Turkmenistan | 1st | Debut |
| Bangladesh | 1st | Debut |
| Indonesia | 1st | Debut |

== Venues ==
The matches are played at the Bangkok Arena and Indoor Stadium Huamark in Bangkok.

| Nong Chok | Bangkok Metropolis | Bang Kapi |
|---|---|---|
| Bangkok Arena | Bangkok Metropolis | Indoor Stadium Huamark |
| Capacity: 12,000 | Bangkok Metropolis | Capacity: 10,000 |
| | 2018 AFC Women's Futsal Championship (Bangkok) | |

== Draw ==
The final draw was held on 5 March 2018, 15:30 MYT (UTC+8), at the AFC House in Kuala Lumpur. The 15 teams were drawn into three group of four teams (Groups A, B and C) and one group of three teams (Group D). The teams were seeded according to their performance in the 2015 AFC Women's Futsal Championship tournament, with the hosts Thailand automatically seeded and assigned to Position A1 in the draw.

| Pot 1 | Pot 2 | Pot 3 (debutants) |
|---|---|---|
| 1. Thailand (hosts); 2. Iran; 3. Japan; 4. Malaysia | 5. China; 6. Hong Kong; 7. Uzbekistan; 8. Vietnam | 9. Bahrain; 10. Chinese Taipei; 11. Lebanon; 12. Macau; 13. Turkmenistan; 14. Bangladesh; 15. Indonesia |

== Squads ==
Each team must register a squad of 14 players, minimum two of whom must be goalkeepers (Regulations Articles 27.1 and 27.2).

== Group stage ==
The winner of each group and the best runner-up advance to the semi-finals.

Tiebreakers

Teams are ranked according to points (3 points for a win, 1 point for a draw, 0 points for a loss), and if tied on points, the following tiebreaking criteria are applied, in the order given, to determine the rankings (Regulations Article 10.5):

1. Points in head-to-head matches among tied teams;
2. Goal difference in head-to-head matches among tied teams;
3. Goals scored in head-to-head matches among tied teams;
4. If more than two teams are tied, and after applying all head-to-head criteria above, a subset of teams are still tied, all head-to-head criteria above are reapplied exclusively to this subset of teams;
5. Goal difference in all group matches;
6. Goals scored in all group matches;
7. Penalty shoot-out if only two teams are tied and they met in the last round of the group;
8. Disciplinary points (yellow card = 1 point, red card as a result of two yellow cards = 3 points, direct red card = 3 points, yellow card followed by direct red card = 4 points);
9. Drawing of lots.

All times are local, ICT (UTC+7).

Schedule
| Matchday | Dates | Matches | |
| Matchday | Dates | Groups A–C | Group D |
|---|---|---|---|
| Matchday 1 | 2–3 May 2018 | 1 v 4, 2 v 3 | 3 v 1 |
| Matchday 2 | 4–5 May 2018 | 4 v 2, 3 v 1 | 2 v 3 |
| Matchday 3 | 6–7 May 2018 | 1 v 2, 3 v 4 | 1 v 2 |

=== Group A ===
| Pos | Team | Pld | W | D | L | GF | GA | GD | Pts | Qualification |
|---|---|---|---|---|---|---|---|---|---|---|
| 1 | Thailand (H) | 3 | 2 | 1 | 0 | 24 | 1 | +23 | 7 | Knockout stage |
| 2 | Indonesia | 3 | 2 | 1 | 0 | 12 | 1 | +11 | 7 | Knockout stage |
| 3 | Hong Kong | 3 | 1 | 0 | 2 | 7 | 10 | −3 | 3 | |
| 4 | Macau | 3 | 0 | 0 | 3 | 0 | 31 | −31 | 0 | |

Source: AFC
Rules for classification: Group stage tiebreakers
(H) Hosts
2 May 2018
15:30

| Hong Kong | 0–2 | Indonesia |
|---|---|---|
| | Report | Febriana 33'; Fitri 38' |

Indoor Stadium Huamark, Bangkok
Attendance: 150
Referee: Kumi Hiruma (Japan)
2 May 2018
18:00

| Thailand | 15–0 | Macau |
|---|---|---|
| Sasicha 2', 3', 19', 30', 31'; Jiraprapa N. 5'; Darika 6', 14', 16'; Jenjira 8'; Mutita 20'; Pacharaporn 32'; Orapin 35'; Jiraprapa T. 37'; Kuan Chi Kio 37' (o.g.) | Report |

Indoor Stadium Huamark, Bangkok
Attendance: 510
Referee: Gelareh Nazemideylami (Iran)

4 May 2018
15:30

| Macau | 0–7 | Hong Kong |
|---|---|---|
| | Report | Yuen 13', 15'; Yiu Hei Man 19'; Ng Wing Kum 24'; Cheung Wai Ki 28', 38'; Wong So Han 39' |

Indoor Stadium Huamark, Bangkok
Attendance: 150
Referee: Maryam Poor Jafarian (Iran)
4 May 2018
18:00

| Indonesia | 1–1 | Thailand |
|---|---|---|
| Febriana 24' | Report | Darika 25' |

Indoor Stadium Huamark, Bangkok
Attendance: 700
Referee: Irina Velikanova (Russia)

6 May 2018
18:00

| Thailand | 8–0 | Hong Kong |
|---|---|---|
| Jenjira 1', 26'; Mutita 2'; Sasicha 8', 19', 30'; Darika 33'; Natthamon 40' | Report |

Indoor Stadium Huamark, Bangkok
Attendance: 871
Referee: Abdallah Ghaith (Lebanon)
6 May 2018
18:00

| Indonesia | 9–0 | Macau |
|---|---|---|
| Kuan Chi Kio 2' (o.g.); Fitri 3', 15', 28'; Rani 11', 21'; Fitriya 25', 26'; Anggi 33' | Report |

Bangkok Arena, Bangkok
Attendance: 50
Referee: Mari Miyazaki (Japan)

=== Group B ===
| Pos | Team | Pld | W | D | L | GF | GA | GD | Pts | Qualification |
|---|---|---|---|---|---|---|---|---|---|---|
| 1 | Vietnam | 3 | 3 | 0 | 0 | 11 | 1 | +10 | 9 | Knockout stage |
| 2 | Chinese Taipei | 3 | 2 | 0 | 1 | 10 | 4 | +6 | 6 | Knockout stage |
| 3 | Malaysia | 3 | 1 | 0 | 2 | 10 | 8 | +2 | 3 | |
| 4 | Bangladesh | 3 | 0 | 0 | 3 | 2 | 20 | −18 | 0 | |

Source: AFC
Rules for classification: Group stage tiebreakers
2 May 2018
15:30

| Vietnam | 1–0 | Chinese Taipei |
|---|---|---|
| Nguyễn Thị Thành 30' | Report |

Bangkok Arena, Bangkok
Attendance: 50
Referee: Chiara Perona (Italy)
2 May 2018
18:00

| Malaysia | 7–1 | Bangladesh |
|---|---|---|
| Hanis Farhana 3'; Zurain 4'; Asnidah 18'; Shazreen 19', 40'; Atiqah 20'; Intan 22' | Report | Parvin 3' |

Bangkok Arena, Bangkok
Attendance: 50
Referee: Liang Qingyun (China)

4 May 2018
15:30

| Bangladesh | 0–7 | Vietnam |
|---|---|---|
| | Report | Đỗ Thị Nguyên 3', 31', 39'; Võ Thị Thùy Trinh 11', 12'; Nguyễn Thị Thành 21'; Lê Thị Thùy Linh 24' |

Bangkok Arena, Bangkok
Attendance: 56
Referee: Mari Miyazaki (Japan)
4 May 2018
18:00

| Chinese Taipei | 4–2 | Malaysia |
|---|---|---|
| Chen Ya-chun 18' (pen.); Wang Shu-wen 26'; Hsieh Pei-fen 29'; Kuo Tsu-erh 32' | Report | Asnidah 5'; Zurain 35' |

Bangkok Arena, Bangkok
Attendance: 100
Referee: Kumiko Matsuo (Japan)

6 May 2018
15:30

| Malaysia | 1–3 | Vietnam |
|---|---|---|
| Zurain 19' | Report | Đỗ Thị Nguyên 17'; Trịnh Nguyễn Thanh Hằng 18', 39' |

Bangkok Arena, Bangkok
Attendance: 50
Referee: Liang Qingyun (China)
6 May 2018
15:30

| Chinese Taipei | 6–1 | Bangladesh |
|---|---|---|
| A. Khatun 1' (o.g.); Lin Ya-hui 3', 29'; Tang Yung-ching 9'; Wang Shu-wen 18'; Kuo Tsu-erh 25' | Report | S. Khatun 22' |

Indoor Stadium Huamark, Bangkok
Attendance: 156
Referee: Kumi Hiruma (Japan)

=== Group C ===
| Pos | Team | Pld | W | D | L | GF | GA | GD | Pts | Qualification |
|---|---|---|---|---|---|---|---|---|---|---|
| 1 | Japan | 3 | 3 | 0 | 0 | 24 | 5 | +19 | 9 | Knockout stage |
| 2 | China | 3 | 2 | 0 | 1 | 15 | 8 | +7 | 6 | Knockout stage |
| 3 | Lebanon | 3 | 1 | 0 | 2 | 4 | 13 | −9 | 3 | |
| 4 | Bahrain | 3 | 0 | 0 | 3 | 4 | 21 | −17 | 0 | |

Source: AFC
Rules for classification: Group stage tiebreakers
3 May 2018
15:30

| China | 5–2 | Bahrain |
|---|---|---|
| Li Jingjing 3'; Tian Jiao 11'; Zhan Huimin 14'; Li Yingqing 16'; Shen Nan 18' | Report | Al Isa 1'; Yaqoob 15' |

Bangkok Arena, Bangkok
Attendance: 50
Referee: Maryam Poor Jafarian (Iran)
3 May 2018
18:00

| Japan | 5–1 | Lebanon |
|---|---|---|
| Eguchi 2'; Kato 8'; Amishiro 13'; Egawa 25'; Katsumata 31' | Report | Rachid 15' |

Bangkok Arena, Bangkok
Attendance: 50
Referee: Fathi Zari (Iran)

5 May 2018
15:30

| Lebanon | 0–6 | China |
|---|---|---|
| | Report | Li Jingjing 2', 20'; Shen Nan 28', 38'; Zhan Huimin 33'; Tian Jiao 39' |

Bangkok Arena, Bangkok
Attendance: 60
Referee: Ridzuan Rozali (Malaysia)
5 May 2018
18:00

| Bahrain | 0–13 | Japan |
|---|---|---|
| | Report | Wakabayashi 7', 17', 34'; Amishiro 10', 28', 37'; Egawa 18', 36'; Katsumata 20'; Fujita 29'; Eguchi 35'; Chida 38', 39' |

Bangkok Arena, Bangkok
Attendance: 95
Referee: Chiara Perona (Italy)

7 May 2018
15:30

| Japan | 6–4 | China |
|---|---|---|
| Amishiro 4', 32', 40'; Egawa 7'; Nakajima 38'; Komura 40' | Report | Li Yingqing 20'; Tian Jiao 24'; Wang Ting 39'; Li Jingjing 40' |

Bangkok Arena, Bangkok
Attendance: 80
Referee: Maryam Poor Jafarian (Iran)
7 May 2018
15:30

| Bahrain | 2–3 | Lebanon |
|---|---|---|
| Mubarak 12'; Al Khattal 15' | Report | Rachid 3', 10'; Hosry 23' |

Indoor Stadium Huamark, Bangkok
Attendance: 102
Referee: Fathi Zari (Iran)

=== Group D ===
| Pos | Team | Pld | W | D | L | GF | GA | GD | Pts | Qualification |
|---|---|---|---|---|---|---|---|---|---|---|
| 1 | Iran | 2 | 2 | 0 | 0 | 23 | 2 | +21 | 6 | Knockout stage |
| 2 | Uzbekistan | 2 | 1 | 0 | 1 | 5 | 10 | −5 | 3 | Knockout stage |
| 3 | Turkmenistan | 2 | 0 | 0 | 2 | 1 | 17 | −16 | 0 | |

Source: AFC
Rules for classification: Group stage tiebreakers
3 May 2018
18:00

| Turkmenistan | 0–14 | Iran |
|---|---|---|
| | Report | Etedadi 1', 12', 35', 38'; Zarei 5', 6', 40'; Karimi 8', 16', 23'; Papi 16'; Moghimi 18'; Sadaghiani 24'; Shirbeigi 32' |

Indoor Stadium Huamark, Bangkok
Attendance: 105
Referee: Mari Miyazaki (Japan)

5 May 2018
18:00

| Uzbekistan | 3–1 | Turkmenistan |
|---|---|---|
| Nazarova 17'; Safina 19'; Burkhonova 23' | Report | Eşnyýazowa 40' |

Indoor Stadium Huamark, Bangkok
Attendance: 100
Referee: Ji Shuang (China)

7 May 2018
18:00

| Iran | 9–2 | Uzbekistan |
|---|---|---|
| Zarbieva 1' (o.g.); Shirbeigi 2', 24', 32'; Karimi 3'; Etedadi 10', 34'; Arzhangi 25'; Khosravi 40' | Report | Safina 30'; Shoyimova 38' (pen.) |

Indoor Stadium Huamark, Bangkok
Attendance: 168
Referee: Kumiko Matsuo (Japan)

== Knockout stage ==
In the knockout stage, extra time and penalty shoot-out are used to decide the winner if necessary, except for the third place match where penalty shoot-out (no extra time) is used to decide the winner if necessary (Regulations Articles 14.1 and 15.1).

=== Bracket ===
Quarter-finals
9 May – Bangkok (ISH)
Thailand | 6
Chinese Taipei | 1
9 May – Bangkok (ISH)
Japan | 5
Uzbekistan | 1
9 May – Bangkok (BA)
Vietnam | 2
Indonesia | 1
9 May – Bangkok (BA)
Iran | 4
China | 2

Semi-finals
10 May – Bangkok (ISH)
Thailand | 1
Japan | 2
10 May – Bangkok (ISH)
Vietnam | 0
Iran | 5

Final
12 May – Bangkok (ISH)
Japan | 2
Iran | 5
Third place
12 May – Bangkok (ISH)
Thailand (p) | 0 (3)
Vietnam | 0 (2)

=== Quarter-finals ===
9 May 2018
15:00

| Iran | 4–2 | China |
|---|---|---|
| Karimi 2'; Gholami 16'; Etedadi 21'; Shirbeigi 37' | Report | Tian Jiao 3'; Zhang Yue 9' |

Bangkok Arena, Bangkok
Attendance: 80
Referee: Irina Velikanova (Russia)

9 May 2018
15:00

| Japan | 5–1 | Uzbekistan |
|---|---|---|
| Amishiro 15'; Egawa 21'; Yokoyama 26'; Nakajima 28'; Yotsui 33' | Report | Safina 36' |

Indoor Stadium Huamark, Bangkok
Attendance: 167
Referee: Liang Qingyun (China)

9 May 2018
18:00

| Vietnam | 2–1 | Indonesia |
|---|---|---|
| Bùi Thị Trang 13'; Nguyễn Thị Huế 37' | Report | Febriana 25' |

Bangkok Arena, Bangkok
Attendance: 80
Referee: Kumiko Matsuo (Japan)

9 May 2018
18:00

| Thailand | 6–1 | Chinese Taipei |
|---|---|---|
| Darika 17'; Sasicha 23'; Jiraprapa T. 23'; Mutita 32', 34', 39' | Report | Chen Pin-hui 19' |

Indoor Stadium Huamark, Bangkok
Attendance: 1,133
Referee: Fathi Zari (Iran)

=== Semi-finals ===
Winners qualify for 2018 Summer Youth Olympics girls' futsal tournament, to be represented by their under-18 representative teams.

10 May 2018
15:00

| Vietnam | 0–5 | Iran |
|---|---|---|
| | Report | Sadaghiani 5'; Etedadi 10', 37'; Shirbeigi 14'; Zarei 16' |

Indoor Stadium Huamark, Bangkok
Attendance: 207
Referee: Abdallah Ghaith (Lebanon)

10 May 2018
18:00

| Thailand | 1–2 | Japan |
|---|---|---|
| Jenjira 30' | Report | Egawa 5'; Kato 33' |

Indoor Stadium Huamark, Bangkok
Attendance: 1,578
Referee: Osama Saeed Idrees Sedaif (Bahrain)

=== Third place match ===
12 May 2018
15:00

| Thailand | 0–0 | Vietnam |
|---|---|---|
| | Report |
Penalties
| Darika (penalty scored); Jenjira (penalty scored); Hataichanok (penalty scored) | 3–2 | (penalty missed) Nguyễn Thị Huế; (penalty scored) Lê Thị Thùy Linh; (penalty scored) Nguyễn Thị Thành |

Indoor Stadium Huamark, Bangkok
Attendance: 818
Referee: Kumiko Matsuo (Japan)

=== Final ===
12 May 2018
18:00

| Japan | 2–5 | Iran |
|---|---|---|
| Eguchi 31'; Amishiro 40' | Report | Shirbeigi 27', 30', 31'; Komura 30' (o.g.); Zarei 36' |

Indoor Stadium Huamark, Bangkok
Attendance: 1,339
Referee: Liang Qingyun (China)

== Winners ==
2018 AFC Women's Futsal Championship winners

Iran
2nd title

== Qualified teams for Youth Olympics ==
The following two teams from AFC qualified for the 2018 Summer Youth Olympics girls' futsal tournament. Since Iran also qualified for the 2018 Summer Youth Olympics boys' futsal tournament and chose the boys' tournament over the girls' tournament, they were replaced by Thailand.

| Team | Qualified on | Previous appearances in Youth Olympics |
|---|---|---|
| Japan | 10 May 2018 | 0 (debut) |
| Thailand | 19 August 2018 (confirmed) | 0 (debut) |

Notes

- Since teams from the same association cannot play in both the Youth Olympics boys' and girls' tournaments, if teams from the same association qualify for both tournaments, they must nominate their preferred qualification team, and the next best ranked team will qualify instead if one of the qualified teams are not nominated.
- As participation in team sports (Futsal, Beach handball, Field hockey, and Rugby sevens) are limited to one team per gender for each National Olympic Committee (NOC), the participating teams of the 2018 Youth Olympics futsal tournament will be confirmed by mid-2018 after each qualified NOC confirms their participation and any unused qualification places are reallocated.

== Awards ==
The following awards were given at the conclusion of the tournament:

| Top Goalscorer (Note: Sara Shirbeigi finished ahead of other top scorers by virtue of contributing three assists, compared to her competitors’ two.) | Most Valuable Player | Fair Play award |
|---|---|---|
| (Iran) Sara Shirbeigi | (Iran) Fereshteh Karimi | Iran |

== Goalscorers ==
There were 189 goals scored in 29 matches, for an average of 6.52 goals per match.

9 goals

- (Iran) Fatemeh Etedadi
- (Iran) Sara Shirbeigi
- (Japan) Anna Amishiro
- (Thailand) Sasicha Phothiwong

6 goals

- (Japan) Ryo Egawa
- (Thailand) Darika Peanpailun

5 goals

- (Iran) Fereshteh Karimi
- (Iran) Fahimeh Zarei
- (Thailand) Mutita Senkram

4 goals

- (China) Li Jingjing
- (China) Tian Jiao
- (Indonesia) Fitri Rosdiana
- (Thailand) Jenjira Bubpha
- (Vietnam) Đỗ Thị Nguyên

3 goals

- (China) Shen Nan
- (Indonesia) Febriana Kusumaningrum
- (Japan) Mika Eguchi
- (Japan) Eri Wakabayashi
- (Lebanon) Rayane Rachid
- (Malaysia) Zurain Kamarudin
- (Uzbekistan) Rushaniya Safina

2 goals

- (China) Li Yingqing
- (China) Zhan Huimin
- (Chinese Taipei) Kuo Tsu-erh
- (Chinese Taipei) Lin Ya-hui
- (Chinese Taipei) Wang Shu-wen
- (Hong Kong) Cheung Wai Ki
- (Hong Kong) Heidi Yuen
- (Indonesia) Fitriya Hilda
- (Indonesia) Rani Mulyasari
- (Iran) Arezoo Sadaghiani
- (Japan) Hinako Chida
- (Japan) Masami Kato
- (Japan) Riho Katsumata
- (Japan) Shiori Nakajima
- (Malaysia) Shazreen Munazli
- (Malaysia) Asnidah Zamri
- (Thailand) Jiraprapa Tupsuri
- (Vietnam) Nguyễn Thị Thành
- (Vietnam) Trịnh Nguyễn Thanh Hằng
- (Vietnam) Võ Thị Thùy Trinh

1 goal

- (Bahrain) Hessa Al Isa
- (Bahrain) Eman Al Khattal
- (Bahrain) Marwa Mubarak
- (Bahrain) Manar Yaqoob
- (Bangladesh) Sabina Khatun
- (Bangladesh) Masura Parvin
- (China) Wang Ting
- (China) Zhang Yue
- (Chinese Taipei) Chen Pin-hui
- (Chinese Taipei) Chen Ya-chun
- (Chinese Taipei) Hsieh Pei-fen
- (Chinese Taipei) Tang Yung-ching
- (Hong Kong) Ng Wing Kum
- (Hong Kong) Wong So Han
- (Hong Kong) Yiu Hei Man
- (Indonesia) Anggi Puspitasari
- (Iran) Fatemeh Arzhangi
- (Iran) Nasimeh Gholami
- (Iran) Fereshteh Khosravi
- (Iran) Nastaran Moghimi
- (Iran) Fatemeh Papi
- (Japan) Mio Fujita
- (Japan) Misato Komura
- (Japan) Junko Yokoyama
- (Japan) Saki Yotsui
- (Lebanon) Yara Hosry
- (Malaysia) Hanis Farhana
- (Malaysia) Atiqah Rashid
- (Malaysia) Intan Sarah
- (Thailand) Natthamon Artkla
- (Thailand) Jiraprapa Nimrattanasing
- (Thailand) Pacharaporn Srimuang
- (Thailand) Orapin Waenngoen
- (Turkmenistan) Halida Eşnyýazowa
- (Uzbekistan) Malika Burkhonova
- (Uzbekistan) Zumratjon Nazarova
- (Uzbekistan) Maftuna Shoyimova
- (Vietnam) Bùi Thị Trang
- (Vietnam) Lê Thị Thùy Linh
- (Vietnam) Nguyễn Thị Huế

1 own goal

- (Bangladesh) Akhi Khatun (against Chinese Taipei)
- (Japan) Misato Komura (against Iran)
- (Uzbekistan) Tanzilya Zarbieva (against Iran)

2 own goals

- (Macau) Kuan Chi Kio (against Thailand, Indonesia)

== Tournament team rankings ==
As per statistical convention in football, matches decided in extra time are counted as wins and losses, while matches decided by penalty shoot-outs are counted as draws.

| Pos | Team | Pld | W | D | L | GF | GA | GD | Pts | Final result |
|---|---|---|---|---|---|---|---|---|---|---|
| 1 | Iran | 5 | 5 | 0 | 0 | 37 | 6 | +31 | 15 | Champions |
| 2 | Japan | 6 | 5 | 0 | 1 | 33 | 12 | +21 | 15 | Runners-up |
| 3 | Thailand (H) | 6 | 3 | 2 | 1 | 31 | 4 | +27 | 11 | Third place |
| 4 | Vietnam | 6 | 4 | 1 | 1 | 13 | 7 | +6 | 13 | Fourth place |
| 5 | Indonesia | 4 | 2 | 1 | 1 | 13 | 3 | +10 | 7 | Eliminated in quarter-finals |
| 6 | China | 4 | 2 | 0 | 2 | 17 | 12 | +5 | 6 | Eliminated in quarter-finals |
| 7 | Uzbekistan | 3 | 1 | 0 | 2 | 6 | 15 | −9 | 3 | Eliminated in quarter-finals |
| 8 | Chinese Taipei | 4 | 2 | 0 | 2 | 11 | 10 | +1 | 6 | Eliminated in quarter-finals |
| 9 | Malaysia | 3 | 1 | 0 | 2 | 10 | 8 | +2 | 3 | Eliminated in group stage |
| 10 | Hong Kong | 3 | 1 | 0 | 2 | 7 | 10 | −3 | 3 | Eliminated in group stage |
| 11 | Lebanon | 3 | 1 | 0 | 2 | 4 | 13 | −9 | 3 | Eliminated in group stage |
| 12 | Turkmenistan | 2 | 0 | 0 | 2 | 1 | 17 | −16 | 0 | Eliminated in group stage |
| 13 | Bahrain | 3 | 0 | 0 | 3 | 4 | 21 | −17 | 0 | Eliminated in group stage |
| 14 | Bangladesh | 3 | 0 | 0 | 3 | 2 | 20 | −18 | 0 | Eliminated in group stage |
| 15 | Macau | 3 | 0 | 0 | 3 | 0 | 31 | −31 | 0 | Eliminated in group stage |

Source: AFC
(H) Hosts

== See also ==
- 2017 AFC U-20 Futsal Championship
- Futsal at the 2018 Summer Youth Olympics
