= 2015 AFC Women's Futsal Championship =

Tournament details
- Host country: Malaysia
- Dates: 21–26 September
- Teams: 8 (from 1 confederation)
- Venue: 1 (in 1 host city)

Final positions
- Champions: Iran (1st title)
- Runners-up: Japan
- Third place: Thailand
- Fourth place: Malaysia

Tournament statistics
- Matches played: 16
- Goals scored: 93 (5.81 per match)
- Attendance: 2,880 (180 per match)
- Top scorer(s): (Japan) Chikage Kichibayashi (Malaysia) Farahiyah Ridzuan (7 goals each)
- Best player: (Iran) Fereshteh Karimi

The 2015 AFC Women's Futsal Championship was the first edition of the AFC Women's Futsal Championship, the biennial international futsal championship organized by the Asian Football Confederation (AFC) for the women's national teams of Asia. The tournament was held in Nilai, Malaysia, between 21 and 26 September 2015.

== Qualified teams ==
A total of eight AFC member national teams participated in the tournament. The event invitations were based on participation in the previous two editions of the Asian Indoor and Martial Arts Games (2009 and 2013).

Team	Qualified as	Appearance
Malaysia	Hosts / 2013 Asian Indoor and Martial Arts Games participants	1st
China	2013 Asian Indoor and Martial Arts Games participants	1st
Hong Kong	2013 Asian Indoor and Martial Arts Games participants	1st
Iran	2009 and 2013 Asian Indoor and Martial Arts Games participants	1st
Japan	2009 and 2013 Asian Indoor and Martial Arts Games participants	1st
Thailand	2009 and 2013 Asian Indoor and Martial Arts Games participants	1st
Uzbekistan	2009 and 2013 Asian Indoor and Martial Arts Games participants	1st
Vietnam	2009 and 2013 Asian Indoor and Martial Arts Games participants	1st

Notes

- Indonesia were removed from the competition due to a FIFA suspension.
- Jordan withdrew before the draw was held.

== Venues ==
All matches were played at the Nilai Indoor Stadium, Nilai.

Nilai
Nilai Indoor Stadium
Capacity:

== Draw ==
The draw was held on 14 July 2015 at the AFC House in Kuala Lumpur, Malaysia. The eight teams were drawn into two groups of four teams (one seeded team and three unseeded teams). Japan and Iran, the champions and runners-up at the 2013 Asian Indoor and Martial Arts Games, were seeded in Pot 1, while all other teams were unseeded in Pot 2.

Pot 1 (seeded)	Pot 2 (unseeded)
Japan; Iran	China; Hong Kong; Malaysia; Thailand; Uzbekistan; Vietnam

== Group stage ==
The top two teams of each group advanced to the semi-finals.

Tiebreakers

The teams were ranked according to points (3 points for a win, 1 point for a draw, 0 points for a loss). If tied on points, tiebreakers would be applied in the following order:

1. Greater number of points obtained in the group matches between the teams concerned;
2. Goal difference resulting from the group matches between the teams concerned;
3. Greater number of goals scored in the group matches between the teams concerned;
4. If, after applying criteria 1 to 3, teams still have an equal ranking, criteria 1 to 3 are reapplied exclusively to the matches between the teams in question to determine their final rankings. If this procedure does not lead to a decision, criteria 5 to 9 apply;
5. Goal difference in all the group matches;
6. Greater number of goals scored in all the group matches;
7. Penalty shoot-out if only two teams are involved and they are both on the field of play;
8. Fewer score calculated according to the number of yellow and red cards received in the group matches (1 point for a single yellow card, 3 points for a red card as a consequence of two yellow cards, 3 points for a direct red card, 4 points for a yellow card followed by a direct red card);
9. Drawing of lots.

All times are local, MYT (UTC+8).

=== Group A ===
Pos	Team	Pld	W	D	L	GF	GA	GD	Pts	Qualification
1	Iran	3	3	0	0	19	3	+16	9	Knockout stage
2	Malaysia (H)	3	2	0	1	15	9	+6	6	Knockout stage
3	Hong Kong	3	0	1	2	4	13	−9	1	
4	Uzbekistan	3	0	1	2	8	21	−13	1	

Source: AFC
Rules for classification: Group stage tiebreakers
(H) Hosts
21 September 2015
16:30

Uzbekistan	4–9	Malaysia
Sarikova 25', 32', 35'; Yusupova 32'	Report	Yasin 15', 27', 38'; Ridzuan 16', 35', 39'; Shazreen 24'; Usman 26'; Shahida 37'

Nilai Indoor Stadium, Nilai
Attendance: 80
Referee: Liang Qingyun (China)
21 September 2015
19:00

Iran	6–0	Hong Kong
Zarei 5'; Shirbeigi 24', 29' (pen.), 34', 35'; Karimi 32'	Report

Nilai Indoor Stadium, Nilai
Attendance: 50
Referee: Trương Quốc Dũng (Vietnam)

22 September 2015
16:30

Malaysia	4–1	Hong Kong
Kwong Wing Yan 7' (o.g.); Shahida 30'; Ridzuan 33', 35'	Report	Wong So Han 5'

Nilai Indoor Stadium, Nilai
Attendance: 300
Referee: Kumiko Matsuo (Japan)
22 September 2015
19:00

Uzbekistan	1–9	Iran
Yusupova 9'	Report	Karimi 5', 37'; Zarrinrad 8'; Gholami 13'; Tarazi 18'; Sarikova 25' (o.g.), 26' (o.g.); Shirbeigi 29'; Zarei 30'

Nilai Indoor Stadium, Nilai
Attendance: 40
Referee: Da Fuping (China)

23 September 2015
16:30

Hong Kong	3–3	Uzbekistan
Kwong Wing Yan 14', 39'; Ng Wing Kum 31'	Report	Yusupova 22'; Turdiboeva 24'; Sarikova 24'

Nilai Indoor Stadium, Nilai
Attendance: 40
Referee: Maiket Yuttakon (Thailand)
23 September 2015
19:00

Iran	4–2	Malaysia
Zarei 1'; Zarrinrad 23'; Karimi 27', 29'	Report	Ridzuan 16' (pen.), 39'

Nilai Indoor Stadium, Nilai
Attendance: 450
Referee: Da Fuping (China)

=== Group B ===
Pos	Team	Pld	W	D	L	GF	GA	GD	Pts	Qualification
1	Japan	3	3	0	0	14	5	+9	9	Knockout stage
2	Thailand	3	2	0	1	7	5	+2	6	Knockout stage
3	China	3	1	0	2	5	12	−7	3	
4	Vietnam	3	0	0	3	5	9	−4	0	

Source: AFC
Rules for classification: Group stage tiebreakers
21 September 2015
11:30

Thailand	3–1	China
Sasicha 4'; Nipaporn 7'; Hataichanok 32'	Report	Mao Yifan 22'

Nilai Indoor Stadium, Nilai
Attendance: 50
Referee: Maryam Poor Jafarian (Iran)
21 September 2015
14:00

Japan	4–2	Vietnam
Kichibayashi 5' (pen.), 24'; Higashiyama 10'; Takao 12'	Report	Nguyễn Thị Châu 34', 39'

Nilai Indoor Stadium, Nilai
Attendance: 50
Referee: Hawkar Salar Ahmed (Iraq)

22 September 2015
11:30

China	3–2	Vietnam
Liu Jing 2'; Mao Yifan 30', 35'	Report	Phạm Thị Tươi 16'; Nguyễn Thị Mỹ Anh 21'

Nilai Indoor Stadium, Nilai
Attendance: 30
Referee: Rey Ritaga (Philippines)
22 September 2015
14:00

Thailand	2–3	Japan
Mamyalee 36'; Siranya 38'	Report	Sakata 6'; Kichibayashi 20', 31'

Nilai Indoor Stadium, Nilai
Attendance: 50
Referee: Lee Po-fu (Chinese Taipei)

23 September 2015
11:30

Vietnam	1–2	Thailand
Phạm Thị Tươi 2'	Report	Siranya 13'; Sasicha 38'

Nilai Indoor Stadium, Nilai
Attendance: 30
Referee: Ryan Shepheard (Australia)
23 September 2015
14:00

Japan	7–1	China
Nakajima 3'; Kato 7', 8'; Sekinada 8'; Amishiro 20'; Higashiyama 37'; Wang Hui 40' (o.g.)	Report	Liu Jing 33'

Nilai Indoor Stadium, Nilai
Attendance: 30
Referee: Helday Idang (Malaysia)

== Knockout stage ==
In the knockout stage, extra time and penalty shoot-out were used to decide the winner if necessary (no extra time would be used in the third place match).

=== Bracket ===
Semi-finals
25 September – Nilai
Iran	1
Thailand	0
25 September – Nilai
Japan	8
Malaysia	1

Final
26 September – Nilai
Iran	1
Japan	0
Third place
26 September – Nilai
Thailand	4
Malaysia	1

=== Semi-finals ===
25 September 2015
16:30

Iran	1–0	Thailand
Meisami 32'	Report

Nilai Indoor Stadium, Nilai
Attendance: 130
Referee: Trương Quốc Dũng (Vietnam)

25 September 2015
19:00

Japan	8–1	Malaysia
Sakata 2', 35'; Amishiro 12'; Kitagawa 15'; Higashiyama 23'; Kichibayashi 39' (pen.), 40', 40'	Report	Norazizah 35'

Nilai Indoor Stadium, Nilai
Attendance: 600
Referee: Ryan Shepheard (Australia)

=== Third place play-off ===
26 September 2015
16:30

Thailand	4–1	Malaysia
Sawitree 13'; Hataichanok 15'; Peanpailun 21'; Shazreen 34' (o.g.)	Report	Majid 11'

Nilai Indoor Stadium, Nilai
Attendance: 400
Referee: Kumi Niitsuma (Japan)

=== Final ===
26 September 2015
19:00

Iran	1–0	Japan
Karimi 8'	Report

Nilai Indoor Stadium, Nilai
Attendance: 550
Referee: Liang Qingyun (China)

== Awards ==
AFC Women's Futsal Championship
2015 Champions

Iran
First Title

- Most Valuable Player
  - (Iran) Fereshteh Karimi
- Top Scorer Award
  - (Malaysia) Farahiyah Ridzuan (7 goals, won tiebreaker over (Japan) Chikage Kichibayashi)

== Goalscorers ==
7 goals

- (Japan) Chikage Kichibayashi
- (Malaysia) Farahiyah Ridzuan

6 goals

- (Iran) Fereshteh Karimi

5 goals

- (Iran) Sara Shirbeigi

4 goals

- (Uzbekistan) Makhliyo Sarikova

3 goals

- (China) Mao Yifan
- (Iran) Fahimeh Zarei
- (Japan) Maiko Higashiyama
- (Japan) Mutsumi Sakata
- (Malaysia) Norhawa Yasin
- (Uzbekistan) Mahliyo Yusupova

2 goals

- (China) Liu Jing
- (Hong Kong) Kwong Wing Yan
- (Iran) Sepideh Zarrinrad
- (Japan) Anna Amishiro
- (Japan) Saori Kato
- (Malaysia) Fatin Shahida Azmi
- (Thailand) Hataichanok Tappakun
- (Thailand) Mamyalee Sawitree
- (Thailand) Sasicha Phothiwong
- (Thailand) Siranya Srimanee
- (Vietnam) Nguyễn Thị Châu
- (Vietnam) Phạm Thị Tươi

1 goal

- (Hong Kong) Ng Wing Kum
- (Hong Kong) Wong So Han
- (Iran) Nasimeh Gholami
- (Iran) Zohreh Meisami
- (Iran) Sohila Tarazi
- (Japan) Kana Kitagawa
- (Japan) Shiori Nakajima
- (Japan) Minako Sekinada
- (Japan) Akari Takao
- (Malaysia) Masturah Majid
- (Malaysia) Sity Norazizah Jamal
- (Malaysia) Nur Shazreen Munazli
- (Malaysia) Usliza Usman
- (Thailand) Darika Peanpailun
- (Thailand) Nipaporn Sriwarom
- (Uzbekistan) Feruza Turdiboeva
- (Vietnam) Nguyễn Thị Mỹ Anh

1 Own goal

- (China) Wang Hui (playing against Japan)
- (Hong Kong) Kwong Wing Yan (playing against Malaysia)
- (Malaysia) Nur Shazreen Munazli (playing against Thailand)

2 Own goals

- (Uzbekistan) Makhliyo Sarikova (both playing against Iran)

Source: the-AFC.com
