= AFC Women's Asian Cup qualification =

- Founded: 2006; 20 years ago
- Region: AFC (Asia)
- Teams: 46
- 2029

The AFC Women's Asian Cup qualification, is a quadrennial international association football competition for women's, organised by the sport's Asian governing body, the Asian Football Confederation (AFC) to decide the participants for AFC Women's Asian Cup. The competition has been held since 1975. Between 2006 and 2010 the tournament was held biennially, since 2010 it has been held every four years.

== History ==
From 1975 to 2003 the qualification tournament for the final tournament did not exist and the teams were invited to participate. In 2006, the structure saw a major overhaul, with a qualifier tournament introduced for the final championship tournament, allowing all the member nations of AFC to participate. The tournament was also rebranded to 'AFC Women's Asian Cup'.

Since 2006, the qualification tournament has seen various changes in format. In the current format, a total of twelve teams qualify for the final tournament which includes the hosts, top three finishers of previous edition and eight teams who qualify via qualification tournament. From the 2029 edition, a total of twelve teams will qualify for the final tournament which includes the hosts and eleven teams who qualify via the second round of the new 2-round qualification tournament.

Tournament	Debutants	Number of teams in the qualifiers	Number of teams in the final tournament
1975	Hong Kong*	—	6
1975	Thailand	—	6
1975	Australia**	—	6
1975	Singapore	—	6
1975	New Zealand**	—	6
1975	Malaysia	—	6
1977	Indonesia	—	6
1977	Republic of China*	—	6
1977	Japan	—	6
1980	India	—	6
1980	Western Australia**	—	6
1981	Philippines	—N/a	8
1983	None	—N/a	6
1986	China	—	7
1986	Nepal	—	7
1989	North Korea	—N/a	8
1991	South Korea	—N/a	9
1993	None	—N/a	8
1995	Kazakhstan	—	11
1995	Uzbekistan	—	11
1997	Guam	—N/a	11
1999	Vietnam	—N/a	15
2001	None	—N/a	14
2003	Myanmar	—N/a	14
2006	Australia (as an AFC member)	12	9
2008	None	10	8
2010	None	12	8
2014	Jordan*	16	8
2018	None	19	8
2022	Iran	24	12
2026	Bangladesh	34	12

* – Hosts
** – OFC members

== See also ==
- AFC Asian Cup qualifiers
