= AFC Women's Futsal Asian Cup =

- Organiser(s): AFC
- Founded: September 2015; 11 years ago
- Region: Asia
- Teams: 12 (finals)
- Current champions: Japan (1st title)
- Most championships: Iran (2 titles)
- 2025 AFC Women's Futsal Asian Cup

The AFC Women's Futsal Asian Cup (previously the AFC Women's Futsal Championship before 2021), is the quadrennial premier national women's futsal competition of the Asian Football Confederation nations. The first edition was held in Malaysia in 2015.

Starting from 2025, the tournament serves as a qualification for the FIFA Futsal Women's World Cup.

Iran won the first two editions. Japan are the reigning champions, having won their first title in 2025.

== Results ==
=== Summary ===
Edition	Year	Host	Final			Third place match			Number of teams
Edition	Year	Host	Champions	Score	Runners-up	Third place	Score	Fourth place	Number of teams
1	2015	Malaysia	Iran	1–0	Japan	Thailand	4–1	Malaysia	8 (Note: Indonesia was removed from the competition due to a FIFA suspension and Jordan withdrew.)
2	2018	Thailand	Iran	5–2	Japan	Thailand	0–0 (3–2 pen.)	Vietnam	15
—	2020	Kuwait	Cancelled due to COVID-19 pandemic
3	2025	China	Japan	3–3 (a.e.t.) (3–2 p)	Thailand	Iran	3–1	China	12
4	2028	Myanmar

- a.e.t.: after extra time
- p: after penalty shoot-out

=== Teams reaching the top four ===
Team	Winners	Runners-up	Third place	Fourth place
Iran	2 (2015, 2018)		1 (2025)	
Japan	1 (2025)	2 (2015, 2018)		
Thailand		1 (2025)	2 (2015, 2018*)	
China				1 (2025*)
Malaysia				1 (2015*)
Vietnam				1 (2018)

* as hosts

== Summary (2015–2025) ==
Rank	Team	Part	M	W	D	L	GF	GA	GD	Points
1	Iran	3	16	14	1	1	70	15	+55	43
2	Japan	3	17	13	1	3	72	31	+41	40
3	Thailand	3	17	10	4	3	60	19	+41	34
4	China	3	13	7	0	6	42	35	+7	21
5	Vietnam	3	13	6	2	5	26	21	+5	20
6	Chinese Taipei	2	8	4	0	4	22	19	+3	12
7	Indonesia	2	8	3	2	3	20	15	+5	11
8	Malaysia	2	8	3	0	5	27	29	–2	9
9	Hong Kong	3	10	2	1	7	24	39	–15	7
10	Uzbekistan	3	9	2	1	6	19	46	–27	7
11	Lebanon	1	3	1	0	2	4	13	–9	3
12	Australia	1	3	0	0	3	2	7	–5	0
13	Philippines	1	3	0	0	3	3	11	–8	0
14	Turkmenistan	1	2	0	0	2	1	17	–16	0
15	Bangladesh	1	3	0	0	3	2	20	–18	0
16	Bahrain	2	6	0	0	6	7	33	–26	0
17	Macau	1	3	0	0	3	0	31	–31	0

== Participating nations ==
Legend:

- 1st — Champions
- 2nd — Runners-up
- 3rd — Third place
- 4th — Fourth place
- QF — Quarter-finalists
- GS — Group stage
- q — Qualified for upcoming tournament
- •• — Qualified but withdrew
- • — Did not qualify
- × — Did not enter
- × — Withdrew / Banned / Entry not accepted by FIFA
- — Hosts
- — Not affiliated to FIFA

For each tournament, the number of teams in each finals tournament (in brackets) are shown:

Team	2015 (8)	2018 (15)	2020 (0)	2025 (12)	Total
Australia	×	×		GS	1
Bahrain	×	GS		GS	2
Bangladesh	×	GS		×	1
China	GS	QF		4th	3
Chinese Taipei	×	QF		QF	2
Hong Kong	GS	GS		QF	3
Indonesia	×	QF		QF	2
Iran	1st	1st	••	3rd	3
Japan	2nd	2nd		1st	3
Jordan	••	×		×	0
Kuwait	×	×	••	•	0
Lebanon	×	GS		•	1
Macau	×	GS		•	1
Malaysia	4th	GS		×	2
Philippines	×	×		GS	1
Thailand	3rd	3rd		2nd	3
Turkmenistan	×	GS		•	1
Uzbekistan	GS	QF		GS	3
Vietnam	GS	4th		QF	3
Total	8	15	~~16~~ (Note: A total 16 teams maximum were expected to participate before its cancellation due to the COVID-19 pandemic. Kuwait as hosts and Iran as defending champions originally qualified.)	12	

== FIFA Futsal Women's World Cup performances ==
- 1st — Champions
- 2nd — Runners-up
- 3rd — Third place
- 4th — Fourth place
- QF — Quarter-finalists
- GS — Group stage
- q — Qualified for upcoming tournament
- •• — Qualified but withdrew
- • — Did not qualify
- × — Did not enter
- × — Withdrew / Banned / Entry not accepted by FIFA
- — Hosts
- — Not affiliated to FIFA

For each tournament, the number of teams in each finals tournament (in brackets) are shown:

Team	(Philippines) 2025 (16)	Total
Iran	GS	1
Japan	QF	1
Philippines	GS	1
Thailand	GS	1
Total		4

== Awards ==
=== Most valuable players ===
Year	Player
2015	(Iran) Fereshteh Karimi
2018	(Iran) Fereshteh Karimi
2025	(Japan) Sara Oino

=== Top scorers ===
Year	Player	Goals
2015	(Japan) Chikage Kichibayashi (Malaysia) Farahiyah Ridzuan	7
2018	(Iran) Fatemeh Etedadi (Iran) Sara Shirbeigi (Japan) Anna Amishiro (Thailand) Sasicha Phothiwong	9
2025	(Iran) Maral Torkaman	6

=== Fair play award ===
Year	Team
2015	No award
2018	Iran
2025	China

== See also ==
- AFC Futsal Asian Cup
- AFC Futsal Club Championship
