= Nasimeh Gholami =

Iranian futsal player

Personal information
- Date of birth: July 18, 1985 (age 41)
- Place of birth: Tehran, Iran
- Height: 1.85 m (6 ft 1 in)
- Position: Defender

Team information
- Current team: Peykan futsal
- Number: 10

International career
| Years | Team | Apps | (Gls) |
- Iran
- Iran (futsal)

Nasimeh Gholami (Persian: نسيمه غلامى, born July 18, 1985, in Tehran, Iran) is an Iranian footballer and futsal player. She started playing futsal in 2001. She was captain of Iran women's national futsal team since 2014.

== International goals ==
| No | Date | Venue | Opponent | Score | Result | Competition |
|---|---|---|---|---|---|---|
| 1. | 8 October 2021 | Zayed Sports City Stadium, Abu Dhabi, UAE | Syria | 3–0 | 4–1 | 2011 WAFF Women's Championship |
| 2. | 8 October 2021 | Zayed Sports City Stadium, Abu Dhabi, UAE | Syria | 4–0 | 4–1 | 2011 WAFF Women's Championship |

== Honors with National Team ==
1.Championship of Asia in 2018

2.Third position in 2017 Olympic games

3.Championship of Asian Games 2015

4.Championship of west Asian games 2014

5.5th place of world futsal in 2014

6.Runner up in Olympic games 2012

7.Participation in Russia tournaments 7times between 2010-2017
