= Hong Kong women's national futsal team =

Hong Kong
- Association: Football Association of Hong Kong, China
- Confederation: AFC (Asia)
- FIFA code: HKG
- FIFA ranking: 33 ▼1 (24 September 2026)
Home colours	Away colours

First international
- Vietnam 2–1 Hong Kong (Incheon, South Korea; 27 June 2013)

Biggest win
- Macau 0–7 Hong Kong (Bangkok, Thailand; 4 May 2018)

Biggest defeat
- Thailand 8–0 Hong Kong (Bangkok, Thailand; 6 May 2018)

AFC Women's Futsal Asian Cup
- Appearances: 3 (First in 2015)
- Best result: Quarter Final (2025)

The Hong Kong women's national futsal team represents Hong Kong during international futsal competitions. It is under the administration of the Football Association of Hong Kong, China.

== History ==
The Hong Kong Football Association established its women's national futsal team in 2013. Hong Kong joined the women's futsal tournament of the 2013 Asian Indoor and Martial Arts Games.

They were among the participating teams in the inaugural 2015 AFC Women's Futsal Championship. They join the subsequent 2018 edition as well as the qualifiers for the 2025 edition for the tournament now known as the AFC Women's Futsal Asian Cup.

In the 2025 AFC Women's Futsal Asian Cup, Hong Kong suffered a narrow defeat to Vietnam and Iran in 3–5 and 1–3. Then they defeated Philippines with a big score of 7–3, qualifying for the knockout stages for the first time in the team's history.

== Tournament record ==
=== FIFA Futsal Women's World Cup ===
FIFA Futsal Women's World Cup record
Year	Round	Position	GP	W	D	L	GS	GA
(Philippines) 2025	Did not qualify							
Total	–	0/1	0	0	0	0	0	0

=== AFC Women's Futsal Asian Cup ===
AFC Women's Futsal Asian Cup record
Year	Round	Position	GP	W	D	L	GS	GA
(Malaysia) 2015	Group stage	6th	3	0	1	2	4	13
(Thailand) 2018	Group stage	10th	3	1	0	2	7	10
(Kuwait) 2020	Cancelled							
(China) 2025	Quarter Final	7th	4	1	0	3	13	16
Total	–	3/3	10	2	1	7	24	39

=== Asian Indoor and Martial Arts Games ===
Asian Indoor and Martial Arts Games record
Year	Round	Position	GP	W	D	L	GS	GA
(South Korea) 2013	Group stage	4/5	4	1	0	3	8	17
(Turkmenistan) 2017	Group stage	3/4	3	1	0	2	9	9
(Thailand) 2021	Cancelled							
(Saudi Arabia) 2026	To be determined							
Total	–	2/5	7	1	0	5	17	26
