= 2025 CONCACAF W Futsal Championship =

CONCACAF W Futsal Championship 2025
Campeonato Concacaf W de Futsal 2025

Tournament details
- Host country: Guatemala
- Dates: April 28 – May 4
- Teams: 9 (from 1 confederation)
- Venue: 1 (in 1 host city)

Final positions
- Champions: Canada (1st title)
- Runners-up: Panama

Tournament statistics
- Matches played: 15
- Goals scored: 96 (6.4 per match)
- Top scorer(s): (Canada) Esther Brossard (8 goals)
- Best player: (Canada) Esther Brossard
- Best goalkeeper: (Canada) Léa Palacio-Tellier
- Fair play award: Canada

The 2025 CONCACAF W Futsal Championship was the inaugural edition of the CONCACAF W Futsal Championship, the international futsal championship organised by CONCACAF for the women's national teams of North, Central America and the Caribbean. The tournament took place in Guatemala from April 28 to May 4, 2025.

The tournament served as the CONCACAF qualifiers for the FIFA Futsal Women's World Cup. The top two teams qualified for the inaugural 2025 FIFA Futsal Women's World Cup in the Philippines as CONCACAF representatives. Canada claimed the competition's first title with an emphatic 8–2 final win over Panama.

== Participating teams ==
All CONCACAF member associations were eligible to participate in the tournament. Of the 41 eligible nations, only nine members entered the final tournament.

=== Teams ===
Team	FIFA ranking at start of event
Canada	NR
Costa Rica	26
Cuba	NR
Guatemala (host)	NR
Honduras	NR
Mexico	NR
Nicaragua	33
Panama	NR
United States	73

=== Squads ===
Each national team have to submit a squad of 14 players, two of whom must be goalkeepers. Changes to the final squad are permitted only in the event of a serious injury and must be made no later than 24 hours before the team's first match.

Canada	Costa Rica	Cuba	Guatemala	
1 Léa Palacio-Tellier; 2 Erika Pion; 3 Jade Houmphanh; 4 Sophie Thérien; 5 Maude Lagace; 6 Shayla He; 7 Joëlle Gosselin; 8 Cynthia Gaspar-Freire; 9 Esther Brossard; 10 Keera Melenhorst; 11 Erica Hindmarsh; 12 Sadie Sider-Echenberg; 13 Stephie-Ann Dadaille; 14 Jadyn Steinhauer	1 María José Arce; 2 Fabiola Ramírez; 3 Roxiny López; 4 Allison Murillo; 5 Pamela Gorgona; 6 Mariela Solís; 7 Priscila Torres; 8 Karol Arias; 9 Tatiana Cascante; 10 Ariel Barquero; 11 Yerlin Varela; 12 Melissa Jiménez; 13 Genesis Méndez; 14 Mariela Alfaro	1 Melissa González; 2 Marianela Morales; 3 Yarianna Zunzunequi; 4 Yaremis Fuentes; 5 Ana Fernández; 6 Maria Karla Caraballo; 7 Eunises Núñez; 8 Maristania Mengana; 9 Nahomi Aguilar; 10 Elisabet Espinosa; 11 Yeranys Lee; 12 Lucylena Martínez; 13 Katheryn Rodríguez; 14 Gianna Borrego	1 Katherine Aroche; 2 Loida Guigui; 3 Sandra López; 4 Andrea Chajón; 5 Roosbelly Barrios; 6 Danyssa Domínguez; 7 Allisson Chávez; 8 Virna Catalán; 9 Grecia Santizo; 10 Sara Solares; 11 Yosselin Cinto; 12 Tonny Dávila; 13 Katherine Garzaro; 14 Thaily Gómez	
Honduras	Mexico	Nicaragua	Panama	United States
1 Nelly Bustillo; 2 Caterin Rápalo; 3 Fatima Romero; 4 Maybellin Hernández; 5 Raquel Alvarado; 6 Ericka Cárdenas; 7 Linda Moncada; 8 Ana Maria Almendarez; 9 Mirna Pineda; 10 Katherine Amador; 11 Cesia Navarro; 12 Karen Váldez; 13 Allison Pastrana; 14 Sonia Matute	1 Natalia Cano; 2 Karen Hernández; 3 Mariana González; 4 Kenya Castañeda; 5 Ariatna Dorantes; 6 Nely Ramos; 7 Paulina Cruz; 8 Xanic Benítez; 9 Rosa Aguiar; 10 Rubi Carrera; 11 Itzel Cruz; 12 Fernanda Torres; 13 Evelyn González; 14 Ericka Soto	1 Jeymy Urroz; 2 Ixel Guzmán; 3 María Arvizú; 4 Consuelo Montano; 5 Diana Ortega; 6 Dennia García; 7 Hormyne Paiz; 8 Adriana Munguia; 9 Hannah Lee; 10 Rosa Mena; 11 María Rivas; 12 Mariela Salazar; 13 Reyna Hernández; 14 Linda Pravia	1 Nadia Ducreux; 2 Maryorie Pérez; 3 Maritza Escartín; 4 Karina Santamaria; 5 Estefanía Salas; 6 Ariadna Abadia; 7 Kenia Rangel; 8 Laurie Batista; 9 Arianys Arguelles; 10 Gloria Sáenz; 11 Erika Hernández; 12 Maríam Sanjur; 13 María Justiniani; 14 María Montenegro	1 Martha Lord; 2 Jordan Felton; 3 Viet-Thy Tran; 4 Ashley Henderson; 5 Jeanette Fieldsend; 6 Sarah Martin; 7 Emanuelly Ferreira; 8 Hayley Wilson; 9 Janae Braun; 10 Paige Pierson; 11 Carlie Banks; 12 Ellie Goodrich; 13 Citlali Luna; 14 Kiersen Korienek

== Venue ==
The Domo Polideportivo in Guatemala City served as the sole venue.

2025 CONCACAF W Futsal Championship is located in Guatemala	Guatemala City
2025 CONCACAF W Futsal Championship is located in Guatemala	Domo Polideportivo
2025 CONCACAF W Futsal Championship is located in Guatemala	Capacity: 7,500

== Draw ==
The draw for the tournament took place on 19 February 2025 All nine teams were placed on Pot 1 with the team positions of the participating teams spread on two groups placed on Pot 2. The Guatemala as hosts are automatically allocated to A1, Costa Rica as the highest ranked team are placed in B1. Honduras and Nicaragua are to play in qualification round; for the purpose of the proceedings there are drawn together.

== Match officials ==
CONCACAF appointed the following 18 futsal referees to officiate the tournament.

Referees

- (Costa Rica) Yeraldin Araya (2016)
- (Costa Rica) Andy León (2023)
- (Costa Rica) Kimberly Valverde (2025)
- (Cuba) Julio Pascual (2024)
- (Cuba) Yordanka Pouyoux (2024)
- (Dominican Republic) Diego Zuárez (2023)
- (El Salvador) Manuel Barrera (2022)
- (Guatemala) Andrés Cux (2025)
- (Guatemala) Andrea Dávila (2025)
- (Guatemala) Mynor Quintana (2025)
- (Guyana) Colin Abel (2023)
- (Mexico) Eduardo Reynoso (2024)
- (Nicaragua) Ramón Mejia (2025)
- (Panama) Gregorio Evila (2025)
- (Puerto Rico) Héctor Santos (2025)
- (Suriname) Anthony Terborg (2022)
- (United States) Krystin Pahia (2024)
- (United States) Matthew Rodman (2024)

The year in parentheses indicates when each referee became a FIFA international official.

== Preliminary round ==
Honduras and Nicaragua participated in the preliminary round, with the winner (Honduras) joining the remaining seven teams in the group stage.

April 28, 2025
11:00 (13:00 UTC−4)

Honduras	6–5 (a.e.t.)	Nicaragua
Amador 3'14", 10'44", 37'17"; Alvarado 4'18", 46'19" (2pen.); Moncada 36'25"	Report	Hernández 9'55", 15'00"; Mena 25'27", 25'38"; Arvizú 31'48"

Domo Polideportivo, Guatemala City
Referee: Andrea Dávila (Guatemala)
Yordanka Pouyoux (Cuba)

== Group stage ==
=== Tiebreakers ===
Teams were ranked according to points (3 points for a win, 1 point for a draw, 0 points for a loss), and if tied on points, the following tiebreaking criteria were applied, in the order given, to determine the rankings (Regulations Article 12.5):

1. Goal difference in all group matches;
2. Number of goals scored in all group matches;
3. If two or more teams were equal on the basis of the above criteria
  1. Points obtained in the matches played between the teams in question;
  2. Goal difference in the matches played between the teams in question;
  3. Number of goals scored in the matches played between the teams in question;
4. Highest-performing in the Fair play ranking;
5. Drawing of lots.

=== Group A ===
Pos	Team	Pld	W	D	L	GF	GA	GD	Pts	Qualification
1	Mexico	3	3	0	0	13	4	+9	9	Knockout stage
2	Panama	3	2	0	1	11	7	+4	6	Knockout stage
3	Guatemala (H)	3	1	0	2	14	12	+2	3	
4	Cuba	3	0	0	3	4	19	−15	0	

Source: CONCACAF
Rules for classification: Tiebreakers
(H) Hosts
April 29, 2025
14:00 (16:00 UTC−4)

Cuba	2–6	Panama
Zunzunequi 21'53"; Rodríguez 32'44"	Report	Escartín 11'13"; Abadía 15'44" (2pen.), 17'27" (2pen.); Salas 16'33"; Rangel 30'43", 35'38"

Domo Polideportivo, Guatemala City
Referee: Krystin Pahia (United States)
Matthew Rodman (United States)
April 29, 2025
20:00 (22:00 UTC−4)

Guatemala	2–7	Mexico
Chajón 20'35"; Santizo 21'55"	Report	Aguiar 0'14", 17'47"; Soto 4'06"; Carrera 6'10"; E. González 18'45"; I. Cruz 30'37"; M. González 34'43"

Domo Polideportivo, Guatemala City
Referee: Yeraldin Araya (Costa Rica)
Kimberly Valverde (Costa Rica)

April 30, 2025
14:00 (16:00 UTC−4)

Mexico	4–1	Cuba
Benítez 23'16"; I. Cruz 35'09"; P. Cruz 37'45"; Aguiar 38'08"	Report	Aguilar 2'43"

Domo Polideportivo, Guatemala City
Referee: Andy León (Costa Rica)
Héctor Santos (Puerto Rico)
April 30, 2025
20:00 (22:00 UTC−4)

Panama	4–3	Guatemala
Sáenz 1'40", 36'02"; Rangel 4'54"; Abadía 33'30"	Report	Santizo 29'33"; Garzaro 30'53"; Chajón 36'14"

Domo Polideportivo, Guatemala City
Referee: Anthony Terborg (Suriname)
Ramón Mejia (Nicaragua)

May 1, 2025
14:00 (16:00 UTC−4)

Panama	1–2	Mexico
Sáenz 21'19"	Report	I. Cruz 10'39"; Dorantes 36'47"

Domo Polideportivo, Guatemala City
Referee: Kimberly Valverde (Costa Rica)
Yeraldin Araya (Costa Rica)
May 1, 2025
20:00 (22:00 UTC−4)

Guatemala	9–1	Cuba
Garzaro 4'40"; Santizo 10'25", 29'39", 33'45", 37'43"; Gómez 14'20"; Domínguez 16'53", 32'29"; Chávez 39'21"	Report	Zunzunequi 24'28"

Domo Polideportivo, Guatemala City
Referee: Manuel Barrera (El Salvador)
Krystin Pahia (United States)

=== Group B ===
Pos	Team	Pld	W	D	L	GF	GA	GD	Pts	Qualification
1	Costa Rica	3	2	1	0	11	4	+7	7	Knockout stage
2	Canada	3	2	0	1	11	4	+7	6	Knockout stage
3	United States	3	1	1	1	10	5	+5	4	
4	Honduras	3	0	0	3	0	19	−19	0	

Source: CONCACAF
Rules for classification: Tiebreakers
April 29, 2025
11:00 (13:00 UTC−4)

Costa Rica	3–2	Canada
Varela 13'46"; López 23'23"; Alfaro 26'51"	Report	Brossard 6'12"; He 34'54"

Domo Polideportivo, Guatemala City
Referee: Julio Pascual (Cuba)
Andrés Cux (Guatemala)
April 29, 2025
17:00 (19:00 UTC−4)

Honduras	0–7	United States
	Report	Martin 2'03", 3'11", 29'51"; Henderson 8'26", 34'43"; Korienek 19'01", 27'28"

Domo Polideportivo, Guatemala City
Referee: Manuel Barrera (El Salvador)
Eduardo Reynoso (Mexico)

April 30, 2025
11:00 (13:00 UTC−4)

Canada	6–0	Honduras
Brossard 0'52", 20'26"; Dadaille 4'09"; Gaspar-Freire 17'55"; Gosselin 22'13"; He 33'16"	Report

Domo Polideportivo, Guatemala City
Referee: Colin Abel (Guyana)
Gregorio Evila (Panama)
April 30, 2025
17:00 (19:00 UTC−4)

United States	2–2	Costa Rica
Martin 5'17", 23'09"	Report	Varela 31'53"; Cascante 39'45"

Domo Polideportivo, Guatemala City
Referee: Mynor Quintana (Guatemala)
Andrea Dávila (Guatemala)

May 1, 2025
11:00 (13:00 UTC−4)

Costa Rica	6–0	Honduras
Pastrana 0'19" (o.g.); López 11'15"; Barquero 17'26"; Solís 27'53"; Arias 30'19"; Ramírez 32'09"	Report

Domo Polideportivo, Guatemala City
Referee: Yordanka Pouyoux (Cuba)
Diego Suárez (Dominican Republic)
May 1, 2025
17:00 (19:00 UTC−4)

United States	1–3	Canada
Pierson 5'43"	Report	Dadaille 3'17"; Gaspar-Freire 16'26"; Hindmarsh 27'39"

Domo Polideportivo, Guatemala City
Referee: Eduardo Reynoso (Mexico)
Andrés Cux (Guatemala)

== Knockout stage ==
In the knockout stage, if a match is level at the end of normal playing time, extra time shall be played (two periods of five minutes each) and followed, if necessary, by a penalty shoot-out to determine the winner.

=== Bracket ===
Semi-finals
May 3
Costa Rica	1
Panama	3
May 3
Mexico	4 (3)
Canada	4 (4)

Final
May 4
Panama	2
Canada	8

=== Semi-finals ===
Winners will qualify for the 2025 FIFA Futsal Women's World Cup.

May 3, 2025
15:00 (17:00 UTC−4)

Costa Rica	1–3	Panama
López 21'52"	Report	Rangel 15'39"; Batista 37'06"; Ducreux 39'01"

Domo Polideportivo, Guatemala City
Referee: Andrés Cux (Guatemala)
Julio Pascual (Cuba)

May 3, 2025
18:00 (20:00 UTC−4)

Mexico	4–4 (a.e.t.)	Canada
Aguiar 1'48", 13'30"; Dorantes 17'00"; Carrera 39'58"	Report	Houmphanh 21'19"; Gaspar-Freire 22'43"; Brossard 23'24", 26'37"
Penalties
Aguiar (penalty scored); Soto (penalty scored); E. González (penalty missed); Benítez (penalty scored); Carrera (penalty missed)	3–4	(penalty scored) Gosselin; (penalty scored) Brossard; (penalty missed) Dadaille; (penalty scored) Houmphanh; (penalty scored) Gaspar-Freire

Domo Polideportivo, Guatemala City
Referee: Matthew Rodman (United States)
Colin Abel (Guyana)

=== Final ===
May 4, 2025
15:00 (17:00 UTC−4)

Panama	2–8	Canada
Rangel 23'48"; Arguelles 30'28"	Report	Hindmarsh 5'04"; Brossard 6'58", 15'54", 24'39"; Gosselin 14'04"; Melenhorst 28'19"; Dadaille 36'33"; He 39'12"

Domo Polideportivo, Guatemala City
Referee: Yeraldin Araya (Costa Rica)
Krystin Pahia (United States)

== Goalscorers ==
There have been 96 goals scored in 15 matches, for an average of 6.4 goals per match.

8 goals

- (Canada) Esther Brossard

6 goals

- (Guatemala) Grecia Santizo

5 goals

- (Mexico) Rosa Aguiar
- (Panama) Kenia Rangel
- (United States) Sarah Martin

3 goals

- (Canada) Stephie-Ann Dadaille
- (Canada) Cynthia Gaspar-Freire
- (Canada) Shayla He
- (Costa Rica) Roxiny López
- (Mexico) Itzel Cruz
- (Panama) Ariadna Abadía
- (Panama) Gloria Sáenz

2 goals

- (Canada) Joëlle Gosselin
- (Canada) Erica Hindmarsh
- (Costa Rica) Yerlin Varela
- (Cuba) Yarianna Zunzunequi
- (Guatemala) Andrea Chajón
- (Guatemala) Danyssa Domínguez
- (Guatemala) Katherine Garzaro
- (Mexico) Rubí Carrera
- (Mexico) Ariatna Dorantes
- (United States) Ashley Henderson
- (United States) Kiersen Korienek

1 goal

- (Canada) Jade Houmphanh
- (Canada) Keera Melenhorst
- (Costa Rica) Mariela Alfaro
- (Costa Rica) Karol Arias
- (Costa Rica) Ariel Barquero
- (Costa Rica) Tatiana Cascante
- (Costa Rica) Fabiola Ramírez
- (Costa Rica) Mariela Solís
- (Cuba) Nahomi Aguilar
- (Cuba) Katheryn Rodríguez
- (Guatemala) Allisson Chávez
- (Guatemala) Thaily Gómez
- (Mexico) Xanic Benítez
- (Mexico) Paulina Cruz
- (Mexico) Evelyn González
- (Mexico) Mariana González
- (Mexico) Ericka Soto
- (Panama) Arianys Arguelles
- (Panama) Laurie Batista
- (Panama) Nadia Ducreux
- (Panama) Maritza Escartín
- (Panama) Estefanía Salas
- (United States) Paige Pierson

1 own goal

- (Honduras) Allison Pastrana (against Costa Rica)

Source: CONCACAF

== Final ranking and awards ==
=== Final ranking ===
Pos.	Team	G	Pld	W	D	L	Pts	GF	GA	GD
1	Canada	B	5	3	1	1	10	23	10	+13
2	Panama	A	5	3	0	2	9	16	16	0
Eliminated in the semi-finals
3	Mexico	A	4	3	1	0	10	17	8	+9
4	Costa Rica	B	4	2	1	1	7	12	7	+5
Eliminated in the group stage
5	United States	B	3	1	1	1	4	10	5	+5
6	Guatemala	A	3	1	0	2	3	14	12	+2
7	Cuba	A	3	0	0	3	0	4	19	−15
8	Honduras	B	3	0	0	3	0	0	19	−19

=== Individual awards ===
Award	Winner(s)
Best player	(Canada) Esther Brossard
Top scorer	(Canada) Esther Brossard
Best goalkeeper	(Canada) Léa Palacio-Tellier
Fair play	Canada

== Qualified teams for the 2025 FIFA Futsal Women's World Cup ==
The following two teams from CONCACAF will qualify for the 2025 FIFA Futsal Women's World Cup.

Team	Qualified on
Panama	3 May 2025
Canada	3 May 2025
