= Panama women's national futsal team =

Panama
- Nickname(s): Las Canaleras
- Association: Panamanian Football Federation
- Confederation: CONCACAF (North America)
- Head coach: Amarelis De Mera
- Captain: Kenia Rangel
- FIFA code: PAN
- FIFA ranking: 80 ▼1 (8 May 2026)
Home colours	Away colours

First international
- Cuba 2–6 Panama (Guatemala City, Guatemala; 29 April 2025)

Biggest win
- Cuba 2–6 Panama (Guatemala City, Guatemala; 29 April 2025)

Biggest defeat
- Italy 17–0 Panama (Pasig, Philippines; 23 November 2025)

FIFA Futsal Women's World Cup
- Appearances: 1 (First in 2025)
- Best result: TBD

CONCACAF W Futsal Championship
- Appearances: 1 (First in 2025)
- Best result: Runners-up (2025)

The Panama women's national futsal team (Spanish: Selección Femenina de Futsal de Panamá) represents Panama in international women's futsal competitions, and is overseen by la Federación Panameña de Fútbol.

== History ==
Although there had been previous attempts to establish a women's futsal team, particularly following the success of the men's side, none came to fruition. One such effort occurred ahead of the 2017 Central American Games, when Panama initially registered a women's team for the tournament, only for the Panama Olympic Committee to withdraw it prior to kickoff. The situation remained unchanged until 2022, when FIFA announced the launch of the FIFA Women's Futsal World Cup, with the inaugural edition scheduled for 2025. With an official World Cup on the horizon, Panama registered for the CONCACAF qualifying tournament, the 2025 CONCACAF W Futsal Championship. In April 2025, the team made its international debut with a 6–2 victory over Cuba, with Maritza Escartín scoring the first goal in the team's history. After defeating host nation Guatemala 4–3 in their second group match, Las Canaleras secured a place in the semi-finals. Despite losing their final group game to Mexico, the team bounced back to defeat Group A winners Costa Rica 3–1 to qualify for their first-ever FIFA Futsal World Cup, to be held in the Philippines. The Panamanian historic run ended with an 8–2 loss to Canada in the final, earning them a runner-up finish in their international debut.

== Coaching staff ==
Role	Name	Ref.
Head Coach	(Panama) Amarelis De Mera	

== Players ==
=== Current squad ===
The following 14 players were called up for the 2025 CONCACAF W Futsal Championship, from 28 April to 4 May 2025.

No.	Pos.	Player	Date of birth (age)	Club
1	GK	Nadia Ducreux	26 January 1992 (age 34)	Unattached
12	GK	Maríam Sanjur	14 September 2003 (age 22)	Unattached
2	DF	Maryorie Pérez	25 November 1997 (age 28)	(Panamanian Football Federation) UMECIT FC
14	DF	María Montenegro	17 September 2000 (age 25)	Unattached
4	MF	Karina Santamaria	21 November 1994 (age 31)	Unattached
5	MF	Estefanía Salas	1 September 1997 (age 28)	(The Football Association) Chiltern United
6	MF	Ariadna Abadía	31 May 2004 (age 22)	Unattached
7	MF	Kenia Rangel	6 August 1995 (age 30)	Unattached
8	MF	Laurie Batista	29 May 1996 (age 30)	(Panamanian Football Federation) FC Chorrillo
9	MF	Arianys Arguelles	2 May 1991 (age 35)	Unattached
10	MF	Gloria Sáenz	2 July 2002 (age 24)	(Panamanian Football Federation) FC Chorrillo
13	MF	María Justiniani	28 January 1999 (age 27)	Unattached
3	FW	Maritza Escartín	15 June 2003 (age 23)	Unattached
11	FW	Erika Hernández	17 March 1999 (age 27)	(Panamanian Football Federation) UMECIT FC

== Competitive record ==
=== FIFA Futsal Women's World Cup ===
FIFA Futsal Women's World Cup record
Year	Result	Pld	W	D*	L	GF	GA
(Philippines) 2025	Group stage	3	0	0	3	2	32
Total	1/1	3	0	0	3	2	32

*Draws include knockout matches decided on penalty kicks.

=== CONCACAF W Futsal Championship ===
CONCACAF W Futsal Championship record
Year	Result	Pld	W	D*	L	GF	GA
(Guatemala) 2025	Runners-up	5	3	0	2	16	16
Total	1/1	5	3	0	2	16	16

*Draws include knockout matches decided on penalty kicks.

=== Head-to-head record ===
Key

Positive balance (more wins than losses)
Neutral balance (as many wins as losses)
Negative balance (more losses than wins)

The following table shows Panama's all-time official international record per opponent:

Opponent	Pld	W	D	L	GF	GA	GD	W%
Canada	1	0	0	1	2	8	−6	00.00
Costa Rica	1	1	0	0	3	1	+2	100.00
Cuba	1	1	0	0	6	2	+4	100.00
Guatemala	1	1	0	0	4	3	+1	100.00
Mexico	1	0	0	1	1	2	−1	00.00
Total	5	3	0	2	16	16	±0	60.00

== See also ==
- Panama women's national football team
