= Guatemala women's national futsal team =

Guatemala
- Shirt badge/Association crest
- Nickname(s): Las Chapinas (The Chapinas); Azul y Blanca (Blue and White); La Bicolor (The Bicolor)
- Association: National Football Federation of Guatemala
- Confederation: CONCACAF
- Head coach: Rafael Gonzalez
- FIFA code: GUA
- FIFA ranking: 37 ▼3 (8 May 2026)
Home colours	Away colours

First international
- Japan 2–1 Guatemala (Alcobendas, Spain; 6 December 2010)

Biggest win
- Guatemala 9–1 Cuba (Guatemala City, Guatemala; 1 May 2025)

Biggest defeat
- Guatemala 0–11 Brazil (Xanrerê, Brazil; 20 August 2025)

Women's Futsal World Tournament
- Appearances: 3 (First in 2010)
- Best result: Fifth place (2014)

CONCACAF W Futsal Championship
- Appearances: 1 (First in 2025)
- Best result: Group stage (2025)

The Guatemala women's national futsal team (Spanish: Selección de Futsal Femenina de Guatemala) represents Guatemala in international women's futsal, and is controlled by Federación Nacional de Fútbol de Guatemala.

== History ==
Following the launch of the Women's Futsal World Tournament in 2010, a competition played under FIFA futsal rules, Guatemala was invited to the inaugural edition held in Spain, being the sole representative from the CONCACAF region. Las Chapinas played their first match against Japan on December 6, 2010, losing 1–2. The team went on to lose its next two matches against Spain and Russia, ending its tournament journey in the group stage.

The team went on hiatus for the next two years, returning in March 2013 for two friendly matches in San José, Costa Rica against the host team, both of which ended in a draw. They then returned in August 2014, hosting a double-header friendly against the same opponent, with Guatemala winning both matches. Later that year, La Bicolor returned to the Women's Futsal World Tournament for its fifth edition. After losing their two group stage matches against Costa Rica and Spain, the team bounced back by defeating Japan to secure fifth place, their best finish in the tournament.

The following year, Guatemala hosted the 6th edition in Guatemala City. The team began with a win against Japan and a draw against Russia, but ended up losing 10-0 to Spain in their final group stage match. As a result, they played the 5th place game, where they were defeated by Costa Rica.

== Results and fixtures ==
- The following is a list of match results in the last 12 months, as well as any future matches that have been scheduled.

Legend

Win Draw Lose Void or Postponed Fixture

=== 2025 ===
29 April CONCACAF W Championship	Guatemala	2–7	Mexico	Guatemala City
20:00 UTC−6	Chajón 20'35"; Santizo 21'55"	Report	Aguiar 0'14", 17'47"; Soto 4'06"; Carrera 6'10"; E. González 18'45"; I. Cruz 30'37"; M. González 34'43"	Stadium: Domo Polideportivo; Referee: Yeraldin Araya (Costa Rica); Kimberly Valverde (Costa Rica)

30 April CONCACAF W Championship	Panama	4–3	Guatemala	Guatemala City
20:00 UTC−6	Sáenz 1'40", 36'02"; Rangel 4'54"; Abadía 33'30"	Report	Santizo 29'33"; Garzaro 30'53"; Chajón 36'14"	Stadium: Domo Polideportivo; Referee: Anthony Terborg (Suriname); Ramón Mejia (Nicaragua)

1 May CONCACAF W Championship	Guatemala	9–1	Cuba	Guatemala City
20:00 UTC−6	Garzaro 4'40"; Santizo 10'25", 29'39", 33'45", 37'43"; Gómez 14'20"; Domínguez 16'53", 32'29"; Chávez 39'21"	Report	Zunzunequi 24'28"	Stadium: Domo Polideportivo; Referee: Manuel Barrera (El Salvador); Krystin Pahia (United States)

20 August Grand Prix Xanxere GS	Brazil	11–0	Guatemala	Xanxerê, Brazil
20:30 UTC−3				Stadium: Arena Ivo Sguissardi

21 August Grand Prix Xanxere GS	Guatemala	1–5	Colombia	Xanxerê, Brazil
18:00 UTC−3	Grecia Santizo 2'03"	Report	Danna Rodríguez 2'28"; Merlín Salcedo 14'51"; Elizabeth Guerra 22'36"; Mariana Sastoque 30'32"; Alejandra Apraez 34'20"	Stadium: Arena Ivo Sguissardi; Referee: Paula Silva (Brazil); Alfredo Wagner (Brazil)

22 August Grand Prix Xanxere GS	Guatemala	0–2	Morocco	Xanxerê, Brazil
18:00 UTC−3				Stadium: Arena Ivo Sguissardi

24 August Grand Prix Xanxere 3rd	Morocco	3–2	Guatemala	Xanxerê, Brazil
12:00 UTC−3				Stadium: Arena Ivo Sguissardi

26 October 2025 Central American Games	Guatemala	7–2	Nicaragua	Guatemala City

27 October 2025 Central American Games	Guatemala	v	Panama	Guatemala City

== Players ==
=== Current squad ===
- The following 14 players have been called up for the 2025 CONCACAF W Futsal Championship, scheduled from April 28 to May 4, 2025.

No.	Pos.	Player	Date of birth (age)	Club
1	GK	Katherine Aroche	4 January 2005 (age 21)	(National Football Federation of Guatemala) Fundacion BI
12	GK	Tonny Dávila	19 February 1993 (age 33)	(National Football Federation of Guatemala) Champions CFS
2	DF	Loida Guigui	26 July 1992 (age 33)	(National Football Federation of Guatemala) River Sport Femenino
8	DF	Virna Catalán	18 April 2004 (age 22)	(National Football Federation of Guatemala) Champions CFS
3	MF	Sandra López	15 February 1993 (age 33)	(National Football Federation of Guatemala) FC Tigres Femenil
4	MF	Andrea Chajón	22 December 1997 (age 28)	(National Football Federation of Guatemala) Champions CFS
5	MF	Roosbelly Barrios	2 March 1999 (age 27)	(National Football Federation of Guatemala) Xeneize Futsal Club
9	MF	Grecia Santino	20 June 1995 (age 31)	(National Football Federation of Guatemala) River Sport Femenino
10	MF	Sara Solares	6 April 1991 (age 35)	(National Football Federation of Guatemala) Fundacion BI
11	MF	Yosselin Cinto	15 August 1997 (age 28)	(National Football Federation of Guatemala) River Sport Femenino
14	MF	Thaily Gómez	23 December 2003 (age 22)	(National Football Federation of Guatemala) River Sport Femenino
6	FW	Danyssa Domínguez	30 September 1997 (age 28)	(National Football Federation of Guatemala) Fundacion BI
7	FW	Allisson Chávez	29 November 2003 (age 22)	(National Football Federation of Guatemala) Champions CFS
13	FW	Katherine Garzaro	27 June 2000 (age 26)	(National Football Federation of Guatemala) River Sport Femenino

== Competitive record ==
=== FIFA Futsal Women's World Cup ===
FIFA Futsal Women's World Cup record
Year	Round	Position	Pld	W	D*	L	GF	GA
(Philippines) 2025	Did not qualify							
Total	Best: —	0/1	—	—	—	—	—	—

*Draws include knockout matches decided on penalty kicks.

=== CONCACAF W Futsal Championship ===
CONCACAF W Futsal Championship record
Year	Round	Pos	Pld	W	D*	L	GF	GA
(Guatemala) 2025	Group stage	6th	3	1	0	2	14	12
Total	Best: Group stage	1/1	3	1	0	2	14	12

*Draws include knockout matches decided on penalty kicks.

=== Women's Futsal World Tournament ===
Women's Futsal World Tournament record
Year	Round	Position	Pld	W	D*	L	GF	GA
(Spain) 2010	Group stage	8th	3	0	0	3	1	11
(Brazil) 2011	Did not enter							
(Portugal) 2012	Did not enter							
(Spain) 2013	Did not enter							
(Costa Rica) 2014	5th place playoff	5th	3	1	0	2	3	12
(Guatemala) 2015	5th place playoff	6th	4	1	1	2	3	13
Total	Best: Ffith place	3/6	10	2	1	7	7	36

*Draws include knockout matches decided on penalty kicks.

=== Head-to-head record ===
Key

Positive balance (more wins than losses)
Neutral balance (as many wins as losses)
Negative balance (more losses than wins)

The following table shows Guatemala's all-time official international record per opponent:

Opponent	Pld	W	D	L	GF	GA	GD	W%
Costa Rica	8	3	2	3	15	14	+1	37.50
Cuba	1	1	0	0	9	1	+8	100.00
Japan	3	2	0	1	5	4	+1	66.67
Mexico	1	0	0	1	2	7	−5	0.00
Panama	1	0	0	1	3	4	−1	0.00
Russia	2	0	1	1	0	1	−1	0.00
Spain	3	0	0	3	0	26	−26	0.00
Total	19	6	3	10	34	57	−23	31.58

== See also ==
- Guatemala women's national football team
