= Cuba women's national futsal team =

Cuba
- Shirt badge/Association crest
- Nickname(s): Las Leonas del Caribe
- Association: Football Association of Cuba
- Confederation: CONCACAF (North America)
- Head coach: Gregorio Morales
- FIFA code: CUB
- FIFA ranking: 92 (24 September 2026)
Home colours	Away colours

First international
- Cuba 2–6 Panama (Guatemala City, Guatemala; 29 April 2025)

Biggest win
- None

Biggest defeat
- Guatemala 9–1 Cuba (Guatemala City, Guatemala; 1 May 2025)

CONCACAF W Futsal Championship
- Appearances: 1 (First in 2025)
- Best result: Group stage (2025)

The Cuba women's national futsal team (Spanish: Selección nacional femenina cubana de futsal) represents Cuba in international women's futsal competitions, and is controlled by the Football Association of Cuba.

== History ==
Despite being a well-established regional powerhouse in men's futsal, Cuba had not developed a women's national team until the announcement of the FIFA Futsal Women's World Cup, for which they registered to participate in the qualifiers for the inaugural edition in 2025. Cuba had previously made its debut in women's futsal in 2023 during the University International Sports Festival in Yekaterinburg, where a university team represented the nation. On 29 April 2025, the team made its international debut at the 2025 CONCACAF Women's Futsal Championship, suffering a 2–6 defeat to Panama. A second consecutive loss the following day against Mexico ended Cuba's hopes of qualifying for the first-ever edition of the tournament.

== Players ==
=== Current squad ===
The following 14 players were called up for the 2025 CONCACAF W Futsal Championship, from 29 April to 4 May 2025 in Guatemala City.

No.	Pos.	Player	Date of birth (age)	Club
1	GK	Melissa González	4 August 2004 (age 22)	Unattached
12	GK	Lucyelna Martínez	28 May 1991 (age 35)	Unattached
2	DF	Marianela Morales	1 July 1991 (age 35)	Unattached
3	DF	Yarianna Zunzunequi	23 June 2004 (age 22)	Unattached
6	DF	Maria Karla Caraballo	8 November 2003 (age 23)	Unattached
9	DF	Nahomi Aguilar	26 April 1999 (age 27)	Unattached
4	MF	Yaremis Fuentes	30 January 1991 (age 35)	Unattached
5	MF	Ana Fernández	19 March 2004 (age 22)	Unattached
10	MF	Elisabet Espinosa	26 May 2000 (age 26)	Unattached
11	MF	Yeryans Lee	14 September 1995 (age 31)	Unattached
7	FW	Eunises Núñez	24 January 2000 (age 26)	Unattached
8	FW	Maristania Mengana	5 January 2000 (age 26)	Unattached
13	FW	Katheryn Rodríguez	10 September 2002 (age 24)	Unattached
14	FW	Gianna Borrego	7 October 2000 (age 26)	Unattached

== Competitive record ==
=== FIFA Futsal Women's World Cup ===
FIFA Futsal Women's World Cup record
Year	Position	Pld	W	D*	L	GF	GA
(Philippines) 2025	Did not qualify						
Total	0/1	—	—	—	—	—	—

*Draws include knockout matches decided on penalty kicks.

=== CONCACAF W Futsal Championship ===
CONCACAF W Futsal Championship record
Year	Result	Pld	W	D*	L	GF	GA
(Guatemala) 2025	Group stage	3	0	0	3	4	19
Total	1/1	3	0	0	3	4	19

*Draws include knockout matches decided on penalty kicks.

== See also ==
- Cuba women's national football team
