= Costa Rica women's national futsal team =

Costa Rica
- Shirt badge/Association crest
- Nickname(s): Las Ticas; La Sele (The Selection); La Tricolor (The Tricolor)
- Association: Costa Rican Football Federation
- Confederation: CONCACAF
- Head coach: Alex Ramos
- FIFA code: CRC
- FIFA ranking: 27 ▲1 (8 May 2026)
- Highest FIFA ranking: 20 (May 2024)
- Lowest FIFA ranking: 21 (October 2024)
Home colours	Away colours

First international
- Ukraine 2–0 Costa Rica (Oliveira de Azeméis, Portugal; 3 December 2012)

Biggest win
- Malaysia 1–9 Costa Rica (Oliveira de Azeméis, Portugal; 5 December 2012); Nicaragua 0–8 Costa Rica (Managua, Nicaragua; 13 December 2017); Nicaragua 0–8 Costa Rica (Managua, Nicaragua; 14 December 2017)

Biggest defeat
- Costa Rica 0–9 Brazil (Guatemala City, Guatemala; 24 November 2015)

Women's Futsal World Tournament
- Appearances: 4 (First in 2012)
- Best result: Fourth place (2014)

CONCACAF W Futsal Championship
- Appearances: 1 (First in 2025)
- Best result: Semi-finals (2025)

The Costa Rica women's national futsal team (Spanish: selección de futsal femenino de Costa Rica) represents Costa Rica in international women's futsal, and is controlled by the governing body Costa Rican Football Federation.

== History ==
Costa Rica established its women's national futsal team in September 2012. Three months later, the team made its international debut at the 2012 Women's Futsal World Tournament in Portugal. On December 3, 2012, Las Ticas played their first match against Ukraine in Oliveira de Azeméis, suffering a 2–0 defeat. After finishing fourth in the group stage, the team faced Iran in the 7th-place match, where they suffered a defeat, ending the tournament in second-to-last place.

With no official women's futsal competition, the Costa Rican team only participated in the Women's Futsal World Tournament and played friendlies against Guatemala and Nicaragua. Their best finish was fourth place when they hosted the tournament in San José 2014.

Following the launch of the FIFA Futsal Women's World Cup in 2024, Costa Rica confirmed their participation in the CONCACAF qualification process in November of the same year, aiming for a place in the tournament.

== Results and fixtures ==
- The following is a list of match results in the last 12 months, as well as any future matches that have been scheduled.

Legend

Win Draw Lose Void or Postponed Fixture

=== 2025 ===
February 25 Friendly	Costa Rica	0–2	United States	San José, Costa Rica
18:30 UTC−5		Report	Fieldsend 3'18", 19'43"	Stadium: FCRF Arena BN; Attendance: 0 (closed door); Referee: A. Leon, K. Valverde (CRC)

February 27 Friendly	Costa Rica	0–5	United States	San José, Costa Rica
18:30 UTC−5		Report	Fieldsend 3'18", 14'17"; Martin 26'40"; Harshe 28'46"; Banks 32'55"	Stadium: FCRF Arena BN; Attendance: 0 (closed door); Referee: K. Pahia (USA), J. Molina (CRC)

March 1 Friendly	Costa Rica	2–2	United States	San José, Costa Rica
18:30 UTC−5	P. Torres 1'23"; S. Torres 37'00"	Report	Ferreira 17'57"; Martin 37'31"	Stadium: FCRF Arena BN; Attendance: 0 (closed door); Referee: K. Valverde (CRC), K. Pahia (USA)

April 29 CONCACAF W Championship GS	Costa Rica	3–2	Canada	Guatemala City, Guatemala
11:00 UTC−6	Varela 13'46"; López 23'23"; Alfaro 26'51"	Report	Brossard 6'12"; He 34'54"	Stadium: Domo Polideportivo; Referee: J. Pascual (CUB), A. Cux (GUA)

April 30 CONCACAF W Championship GS	United States	2–2	Costa Rica	Guatemala City, Guatemala
17:00 UTC−6	Martin 5'17", 23'09"	Report	Varela 31'53"; Cascante 39'45"	Stadium: Domo Polideportivo; Referee: M. Quintana (GUA), A. Dávila (GUA)

May 1 CONCACAF W Championship GS	Costa Rica	6–0	Honduras	Guatemala City, Guatemala
11:00 UTC−6	Pastrana 0'19" (o.g.); López 11'15"; Barquero 17'26"; Solís 27'53"; Arias 30'19"; Ramírez 32'09"	Report		Stadium: Domo Polideportivo; Referee: Y. Pouyoux (CUB), D. Suárez (DOM)

May 3 CONCACAF W Championship GS	Costa Rica	1–3	Panama	Guatemala City, Guatemala
15:00 UTC−6	López 21'52"		Rangel 15'39"; Batista 37'06"; Ducreux 39'01"	Stadium: Domo Polideportivo; Referee: A. Cux (GUA), J. Pascual (CUB)

== Players ==
=== Current squad ===
- The following 14 players were named for the 2025 CONCACAF W Futsal Championship, held in Guatemala City from April 28 to May 4 2025.

No.	Pos.	Player	Date of birth (age)	Club
1	GK	María José Arce	6 October 1993 (age 32)	(Costa Rican Football Federation) Santo Domingo
13	GK	Génesis Méndez	9 August 1996 (age 29)	(Costa Rican Football Federation) Zarcero
3	DF	Roxiny López	24 March 1999 (age 27)	(Costa Rican Football Federation) Zarcero
5	DF	Pamela Gorgona	3 September 1993 (age 32)	(Costa Rican Football Federation) UNA
6	DF	Mariela Solís	6 December 1999 (age 26)	(Costa Rican Football Federation) UNA
7	DF	Priscila Torres	15 December 1998 (age 27)	(Costa Rican Football Federation) Escazú
10	DF	Ariel Barquero	9 June 1996 (age 30)	(Costa Rican Football Federation) Alajuela
8	MF	Karol Arias	10 January 1998 (age 28)	(Costa Rican Football Federation) Zarcero
11	MF	Yerlin Varela	20 July 2004 (age 21)	(Costa Rican Football Federation) Venus
12	MF	Melissa Jiménez	23 February 1993 (age 33)	(Costa Rican Football Federation) Escazú
14	MF	Mariela Alfaro	30 May 1993 (age 33)	(Costa Rican Football Federation) UNA
2	MF	Fabiola Ramírez	31 March 2006 (age 20)	(Costa Rican Football Federation) Alajuela
4	FW	Allison Murillo	12 December 2000 (age 25)	(Costa Rican Football Federation) UCR
9	FW	Tatiana Cascante	23 June 1996 (age 30)	(Costa Rican Football Federation) Venus

== Competitive record ==
=== FIFA Futsal Women's World Cup ===
FIFA Futsal Women's World Cup record
Year	Round	Position	Pld	W	D*	L	GF	GA
(Philippines) 2025	Did not qualify							
Total	Best: —	0/1	—	—	—	—	—	—

*Draws include knockout matches decided on penalty kicks.

=== CONCACAF W Futsal Championship ===
CONCACAF W Futsal Championship record
Year	Round	Position	Pld	W	D*	L	GF	GA
(Guatemala) 2025	Semi-finals	TBD	4	2	1	1	12	7
Total	Best: Semi-finals	1/1	4	2	1	1	12	7

*Draws include knockout matches decided on penalty kicks.

=== Women's Futsal World Tournament ===
Women's Futsal World Tournament record
Year	Round	Position	Pld	W	D*	L	GF	GA
(Spain) 2010	Did not exist							
(Brazil) 2011	Did not exist							
(Portugal) 2012	7th place playoff	8th	5	1	0	4	13	15
(Spain) 2013	Group stage	8th	3	0	0	3	4	11
(Costa Rica) 2014	3rd place playoff	4th	4	1	0	3	6	21
(Guatemala) 2015	5th place playoff	5th	4	2	0	2	5	18
Total	Best: Fourth place	4/6	16	4	0	12	28	65

*Draws include knockout matches decided on penalty kicks.

== See also ==
- Costa Rica women's national football team
