= United States women's national futsal team =

National sports team

United States
- Shirt badge/Association crest
- Nickname(s): USMNT; Team USA; The Stars and Stripes; The Yanks
- Association: United States Soccer Federation (USSF)
- Confederation: CONCACAF
- Head coach: Diego Burato
- FIFA code: USA
- FIFA ranking: 74 (24 September 2026)
Home colors	Away colors

First international
- Costa Rica 0–2 United States (San José, Costa Rica; February 25, 2025)

Biggest win
- Honduras 0–7 United States (Guatemala City, Guatemala; April 29, 2025)

Biggest defeat
- United States 1–3 Canada (Guatemala City, Guatemala; May 1, 2025)

The United States women's national futsal team represents the United States in international competitions. It is sanctioned by the United States Soccer Federation, affiliated with CONCACAF.

== History ==
The United States Soccer Federation established the first official women's national futsal team under it Extended National Teams department in March 2023. It appointed Márcia Taffarel as its first coach. She created the first pool for the team in March 2023. She held full national team training camps in 2024 and 2025.

Prior to the foundation of US Soccer's team, there was a United States women's national team which took part at the AMF Futsal World Cup. Its best finish was at the 2017 edition after previously finishing in the group stage of the 2013 edition.

Diego Burato was named as head coach in January 2025 replacing Taffarel in the lead up to the 2025 CONCACAF Women's Futsal Championship and the February 2025 camp in Costa Rica. The United States won 2–0 its first ever international against Costa Rica on February 25, 2025.

== Results and fixtures ==
- The following is a list of match results in the last 12 months, as well as any future matches that have been scheduled.

Legend

Win Draw Lose Void or Postponed Fixture

=== 2025 ===
February 25 Friendly	Costa Rica	0–2	United States	San José, Costa Rica
18:30 UTC−5		Report	Fieldsend 3'18", 19'43"	Stadium: FCRF Arena BN; Attendance: 0 (closed door); Referee: A. Leon, K. Valverde (CRC)

February 27 Friendly	Costa Rica	0–5	United States	San José, Costa Rica
18:30 UTC−5		Report	Fieldsend 3'18", 14'17"; Martin 26'40"; Harshe 28'46"; Banks 32'55"	Stadium: FCRF Arena BN; Attendance: 0 (closed door); Referee: K. Pahia (USA), J. Molina (CRC)

March 1 Friendly	Costa Rica	2–2	United States	San José, Costa Rica
18:30 UTC−5	P. Torres 1'23"; S. Torres 37'00"	Report	Ferreira 17'57"; Martin 37'31"	Stadium: FCRF Arena BN; Attendance: 0 (closed door); Referee: K. Valverde (CRC), K. Pahia (USA)

April 29 2025 CONCACAF W Championship	Honduras	0–7	United States	Guatemala City
17:00 UTC−6		Report	Martin 2'03", 3'11", 29'51"; Henderson 8'26", 34'43"; Korienek 19'01", 27'28"	Stadium: Domo Polideportivo; Referee: Manuel Barrera (El Salvador); Eduardo Reynoso (Mexico)

April 30 2025 CONCACAF W Championship	United States	2–2	Costa Rica	Guatemala City
17:00 UTC−6	Martin 5'17", 23'09"		Varela 31'53"; Cascante 39'45"	Stadium: Domo Polideportivo; Referee: Mynor Quintana (Guatemala); Andrea Dávila (Guatemala)

May 1 2025 CONCACAF W Championship	United States	1–3	Canada	Guatemala City
17:00 UTC−6				Stadium: Domo Polideportivo

== Tournament record ==
=== FIFA Futsal Women's World Cup ===
FIFA Futsal Women's World Cup record
Year	Round	Position	GP	W	D	L	GS	GA
(Philippines) 2025	Did not qualify							
Total	–	0/1	0	0	0	0	0	0

=== CONCACAF W Futsal Championship ===
CONCACAF W Futsal Championship record
Year	Round	Position	GP	W	D	L	GS	GA
(Guatemala) 2025	Group stage							
Total	–	5/8	1	1	1	10	5	+5

== Head coaches ==
- (Brazil) Márcia Taffarel (2023–25)
- (Brazil) Diego Burato (2025–)

== See also ==
- United States national futsal team
- Futsal in the United States
