= Honduras women's national futsal team =

Honduras
- Shirt badge/Association crest
- Nickname(s): Las Catrachas
- Association: Football Federation of Honduras
- Confederation: CONCACAF (North America)
- Head coach: Rafaela Argueta
- Top scorer: Katherine Amador (3)
- FIFA code: HON
- FIFA ranking: 86 (24 September 2026)
| Home colours | Away colours |

First international
- Honduras 6–5 (a.e.t.) Nicaragua (Guatemala City, Guatemala; 28 April 2025)

Biggest win
- Honduras 6–5 (a.e.t.) Nicaragua (Guatemala City, Guatemala; 28 April 2025)

Biggest defeat
- Honduras 0–7 United States (Guatemala City, Guatemala; 29 April 2025)

CONCACAF W Futsal Championship
- Appearances: 1 (First in 2025)
- Best result: Group stage (2025)

The Honduras women's national futsal team (Spanish: Selección Femenina de Futsala de Honduras) represents Honduras in international women's futsal competitions, and is governed by the Football Federation of Honduras (FFH).

== History ==
=== Background ===
Due to the absence of official international competitions, few countries had established women's futsal teams. It wasn't until 2022, when FIFA announced the launch of the FIFA Women's Futsal World Cup, that efforts began in Honduras to establish a national women's futsal team. That same year marked the start of a nearly three-year development process for the women's game in the country, led by the National Commission of Sports, Physical Education and Recreation (CONDEPOR) in collaboration with the Honduran Football Federation, aiming to foster the growth of women's futsal nationwide.

=== Debut ===
After registering for the inaugural edition of the CONCACAF W Futsal Championship, the qualifying tournament for the World Cup, Honduras was set to face Nicaragua in a play-in match, with the winner advancing to the final tournament in Guatemala City. On 28 April 2025, Las Catrachas played their historic first match against the Nicaraguans, securing a 6–5 victory after extra time to earn their spot in the final tournament. In the day that followed, Honduras made their debut in the final tournament, suffering a 7–0 defeat to the United States, followed by two 6–0 losses to Canada and Costa Rica, exiting the competition winless and without scoring a goal.

== Coaching staff ==
As of 28 April 2025

| Position | Name |
|---|---|
| Head coach | (Honduras) Rafaela Argueta (Honduras) Stalin Zavala |
| Fitness coach | (Honduras) Lesther Gabarrete |
| Assistant coaches | (Honduras) Luis Pineda |
| Assistant coaches | (Honduras) Cartagena |

== Players ==
=== Current squad ===
The following 14 players were called up for the 2025 CONCACAF W Futsal Championship Play-in and group stage matches, from 28 April to 2 May 2025.

| No. | Pos. | Player | Date of birth (age) | Club |
|---|---|---|---|---|
| 1 | GK | Nelly Bustillo | 27 February 1993 (age 33) | (National Autonomous Federation of Football of Honduras) Salvajes FC |
| 14 | GK | Sonia Matute | 16 March 1998 (age 28) | (National Autonomous Federation of Football of Honduras) Lobas UPN Teg |
| 8 | DF | Ana Maria Almendarez | 21 October 1995 (age 30) | (National Autonomous Federation of Football of Honduras) Policia Nacional |
| 9 | DF | Mirna Pineda | 18 August 1996 (age 30) | (National Autonomous Federation of Football of Honduras) Barca Futsal |
| 10 | DF | Katherine Amador | 7 October 1997 (age 28) | (National Autonomous Federation of Football of Honduras) Barca Futsal |
| 11 | DF | Cesia Navarro | 17 April 2004 (age 22) | (National Autonomous Federation of Football of Honduras) Salvajes FC |
| 2 | MF | Caterin Rápalo | 18 June 2007 (age 19) | (National Autonomous Federation of Football of Honduras) Policia Nacional |
| 6 | MF | Ericka Cárdenas | 7 June 2006 (age 20) | (National Autonomous Federation of Football of Honduras) Salvajes FC |
| 3 | FW | Fatima Romero | 18 October 1999 (age 26) | (National Autonomous Federation of Football of Honduras) Salvajes FC |
| 4 | FW | Maybellin Hernández | 25 May 2002 (age 24) | (National Autonomous Federation of Football of Honduras) Zarca Futsal |
| 5 | FW | Raquel Alvarado | 6 February 2000 (age 26) | (National Autonomous Federation of Football of Honduras) Barca Futsal |
| 7 | FW | Linda Moncada | 7 October 1995 (age 30) | (National Autonomous Federation of Football of Honduras) Salvajes FC |
| 12 | FW | Karen Valdez | 7 January 1999 (age 27) | (National Autonomous Federation of Football of Honduras) Salvajes FC |
| 13 | FW | Allison Pastrana | 19 April 2004 (age 22) | (National Autonomous Federation of Football of Honduras) Lobas UPN Teg |

== Competitive record ==
=== FIFA Futsal Women's World Cup ===
FIFA Futsal Women's World Cup record
| Year | Position | Pld | W | D* | L | GF | GA |
|---|---|---|---|---|---|---|---|
| (Philippines) 2025 | Did not qualify | | | | | | |
| Total | 0/1 | — | — | — | — | — | — |

*Draws include knockout matches decided on penalty kicks.

=== CONCACAF W Futsal Championship ===
CONCACAF W Futsal Championship record
| Year | Result | Pld | W | D* | L | GF | GA |
|---|---|---|---|---|---|---|---|
| (Guatemala) 2025 | Group stage | 3 | 0 | 0 | 3 | 0 | 17 |
| Total | 1/1 | 3 | 0 | 0 | 3 | 0 | 17 |

*Draws include knockout matches decided on penalty kicks.

== See also ==
- Honduras women's national football team
