= Keera Melenhorst =

Canadian soccer player (born 2003)

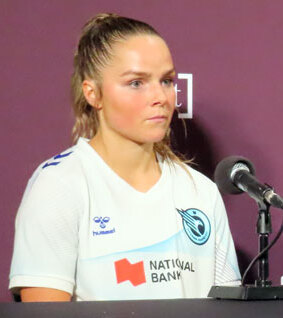
- Melenhorst in 2026

Personal information
- Full name: Keera Michele Melenhorst
- Date of birth: May 2, 2003 (age 23)
- Place of birth: Ottawa, Ontario, Canada
- Height: 1.60 m (5 ft 3 in)
- Position: Midfielder

Team information
- Current team: Ottawa Rapid FC

Youth career
- Dovercourt RC
- Ottawa Royals SC
- West Ottawa SC
- 2018–2021: NDC Ontario

College career
Years	Team	Apps	(Gls)
2021	Oklahoma Sooners	20	(0)
2022–2024	Pittsburgh Panthers	62	(8)

Senior career*
Years	Team	Apps	(Gls)
2018	West Ottawa SC	2	(0)
2018	North Mississauga SC	1	(0)
2022	North Mississauga SC	3	(0)
2025	Linköping FC	11	(2)
2026–	Ottawa Rapid FC	25	(6)

International career^{‡}
2022	Canada U20	9	(2)
2025	Canada (futsal)		(1)
- * Club domestic league appearances and goals as of May 3, 2026 ‡ National team caps and goals as of December 31, 2025

Keera Michele Melenhorst (born May 2, 2003) is a Canadian soccer player who plays as a midfielder for Northern Super League club Ottawa Rapid FC.

== Early life ==
Melenhorst played youth soccer at age three at the Dovercourt Recreation Centre before joining Ottawa Royals SC at age five. and West Ottawa SC before joining the NDC Ontario program in 2018.

== College career ==
In 2021, Melenhorst began attending the University of Oklahoma, where she played for the women's soccer team. She made her debut on August 19, 2021, against the Houston Cougars.

In 2022, she moved to the University of Pittsburgh, joining the women's soccer team.

== Club career ==
In 2018, Melenhorst began playing with West Ottawa SC in League1 Ontario, before moving to North Mississauga SC later in the season. She again played with North Mississauga SC in 2022.

In July 2025, she signed with Swedish Damallsvenskan club Linköping FC. On August 24, 2025, she scored her first goal in a 3–0 victory over Vittsjö GIK. In December 2025, she departed the club.

In 2026, she signed with Northern Super League club Ottawa Rapid FC. She scored her first two goals for the club in a 5–2 win over Calgary Wild FC on May 2, 2026. In July 2026, she signed an extension through 2027.

== International career ==
In 2015, she played for Canada at the Danone Nations Cup, as one of two girls on the roster.

In May 2019, she was called up to a camp with the Canada U17 team for the first time. In 2022, she was named to the Canada U20 squad for the 2022 CONCACAF Women's U-20 Championship, where they finished third. She was then subsequently named to the squad for the 2022 FIFA U-20 Women's World Cup.

In March 2025, she was named to a camp with the Canada women's national futsal team, which would form the first ever team in program history. In April 2025, she was named to the inaugural squad for the 2025 CONCACAF W Futsal Championship, which was the first ever futsal team for Canadian women. She helped the side win the tournament and qualify for the 2025 FIFA Futsal Women's World Cup, however, she was not able to join the squad for the World Cup due to club commitments.

== Career statistics ==
As of October 30, 2026

Appearances and goals by club, season and competition
Club	Season	League			Playoffs		National cup		League cup		Total	
Club	Season	Division	Apps	Goals	Apps	Goals	Apps	Goals	Apps	Goals	Apps	Goals
West Ottawa SC	2018	League1 Ontario	2	0	—		—		0	0	2	0
North Mississauga SC	2018	League1 Ontario	1	0	—		—		0	0	1	0
North Mississauga SC	2022	League1 Ontario	3	0	—		—		—		3	0
North Mississauga SC	Total		4	0	0	0	0	0	0	0	4	0
Linköping FC	2025	Damallsvenskan	11	2	—		0	0	—		11	2
Ottawa Rapid FC	2026	Northern Super League	25	6	0	0	—		—		25	6
Career total			42	8	0	0	0	0	0	0	42	6
