= Naomi Matsumoto =

Naomi Matsumoto may refer to:

- Naomi Matsumoto (futsal player) (born 1997), Japanese futsal player
- Naomi Matsumoto (softball) (born 1968), Japanese softball player
