= Sadie Sider-Echenberg =

Canadian soccer player

Personal information
- Full name: Sadie Batsheva Sider-Echenberg
- Date of birth: September 4, 2003 (age 23)
- Place of birth: Ottawa, Ontario, Canada
- Height: 1.60 m (5 ft 3 in)
- Position: Midfielder

Team information
- Current team: Kristianstad

Youth career
- 2016–2022: Ottawa St Anthony Futuro

College career
Years	Team	Apps	(Gls)
2021–2022	Ottawa Gee-Gees	14	(5)
2023–2026	South Florida Bulls	49	(13)

Senior career*
Years	Team	Apps	(Gls)
2023	Le Havre	8	(2)
2024	FC Olympia	10	(5)
2025	Salmon Bay FC	6	(3)
2026–	Kristianstad	19	(4)
- * Club domestic league appearances and goals as of January 24, 2026

Sadie Sider-Echenberg (born September 4, 2003) is a Canadian professional soccer player who plays as a midfielder for Damallsvenskan club Kristianstads DFF.

== Early life ==
She began playing soccer when she was three years old with Ottawa St. Anthony Futuro Academy in Ottawa.

She played on both the Women's and Men's teams at Ottawa St. Anthony Futuro Academy alongside several players who went on to play in the Canadian Premier League and MLS Next Pro.

She attended Glebe Collegiate Institute in Ottawa. Sider-Echenberg also played rugby and tennis growing up. She lists her idols as Santi Cazorla, Daniëlle van de Donk, Andrés Iniesta and Bernardo Silva.

== College career ==
In 2021, she attended University of Ottawa, where she would play for the women's soccer team She scored her first goal in the 22nd minute against Carleton University on October 9, 2021. In 2021, she was named in the 2021 OUA East All-Star team.

In 2023, Sider-Echenberg attended University of South Florida. She was named the American Athletic Conference midfielder of the year in 2024 after she scored five goals and added two assists for the Bulls in the regular season. She was the first Bull to win Midfielder of the Year since Andrea Hauksdottir won it in back-to-back years in 2018 and 2019.

== Club career ==
Sider-Echenberg trained with PSV, Hoffenheim and Racing Louisville FC before eventually signing with Le Havre AC in 2023.

In March 2023, she played with Le Havre AC in the Division 1 Féminine, making her league debut against Paris Saint-Germain coming on in the 76th minute.

In April 2023, Sider-Echenberg scored her first goal for Le Havre AC against FC Fleury 91 making the score 1–1 in the 86th minute. She became the youngest goal scorer in the Division 1 Féminine in the club's history.

Sider-Echenebrg signed a two year contract with Damallsvenskan side Kristianstads DFF on the 23rd January 2026.

== International career ==
=== Youth ===
She was 18 years old when she made her debut in the Canadian youth program in 2022 when she was called into the Canada U20 team training camp.

=== Futsal ===
Sider-Echenberg represented the Canada women's national futsal team in May 2025 as they made history in winning the 2025 CONCACAF W Futsal Championship to qualify for the FIFA Futsal Women's World Cup.
