= Ana Azevedo (futsal player) =

Portuguese futsal player (born 1986)

Personal information
- Full name: Ana Patrícia Abreu Azevedo
- Date of birth: 28 July 1986 (age 40)
- Place of birth: Vila Nova de Famalicão, Portugal
- Height: 1.64 m (5 ft 5 in)
- Position: Defender

Team information
- Current team: Nun'Alvares

Senior career*
Years	Team	Apps	(Gls)
2007–2022	Vermoim		
2022–2023	Santa Luzia		
2023–	Nun'Alvares		

International career^{‡}
2010–	Portugal		
Medal record
Women's futsal
Representing Portugal
FIFA Futsal Women's World Cup
Runner-up	2025 Philippines
UEFA Women's Futsal Championship
Runner-up	2019 Portugal
Runner-up	2022 Portugal
Bronze medal – third place	2023 Hungary
- * Club domestic league appearances and goals as of 10 May 2025 ‡ National team caps and goals as of 8 April 2025

Ana Patrícia Abreu Azevedo (born 28 July 1986) is a Portuguese futsal player who plays as a defender for Nun'Alvares and the Portugal women's national team.

== Club career ==
Azevedo began her career with Vermoim. During her time with the club, they won the Portuguese championship in season 2015–2016.

After her stint with Santa Luzia in the 2022–2023 season, she moved to Nun'Alvares, with whom she won the Taça da Liga in 2023–2024 season. The following season, she would win her second league championship with the club. In the 2025 Supertaça, she scored the game-winning goal en route to Nun'Alvares' victory.

== International career ==
Azevedo was part of the Portugal squad that competed in the UEFA Women's Futsal Euro 2019, the inaugural edition of the tournament, where her team lost to Spain.

Azevedo competed in the UEFA Women's Futsal Euro 2022, where her team lost to Spain for a second time 3–3 (1–4 in penalties). Azevedo herself was awarded the best player of the tournament.

Azevedo was part of the Portugal squad that competed in the UEFA Women's Futsal Euro 2023, where her team finished in third place.

On 14 November 2025, Azevedo was named to the Portugal squad for the 2025 FIFA Futsal Women's World Cup.

== Personal life ==
Azevedo is the aunt of Gabriela Azevedo who is also a footballer.

== Honours ==
Vermoim

- Campeonato Nacional: 2015–16

Nun'Alvares

- Campeonato Nacional: 2024–25
- Taça da Liga: 2024
- Supertaça: 2025

Portugal

- UEFA Women's Futsal Championship runner-up: 2019, 2022
- UEFA Women's Futsal Championship third place: 2023
