= Emilly =

Brazilian futsal player (born 1994)

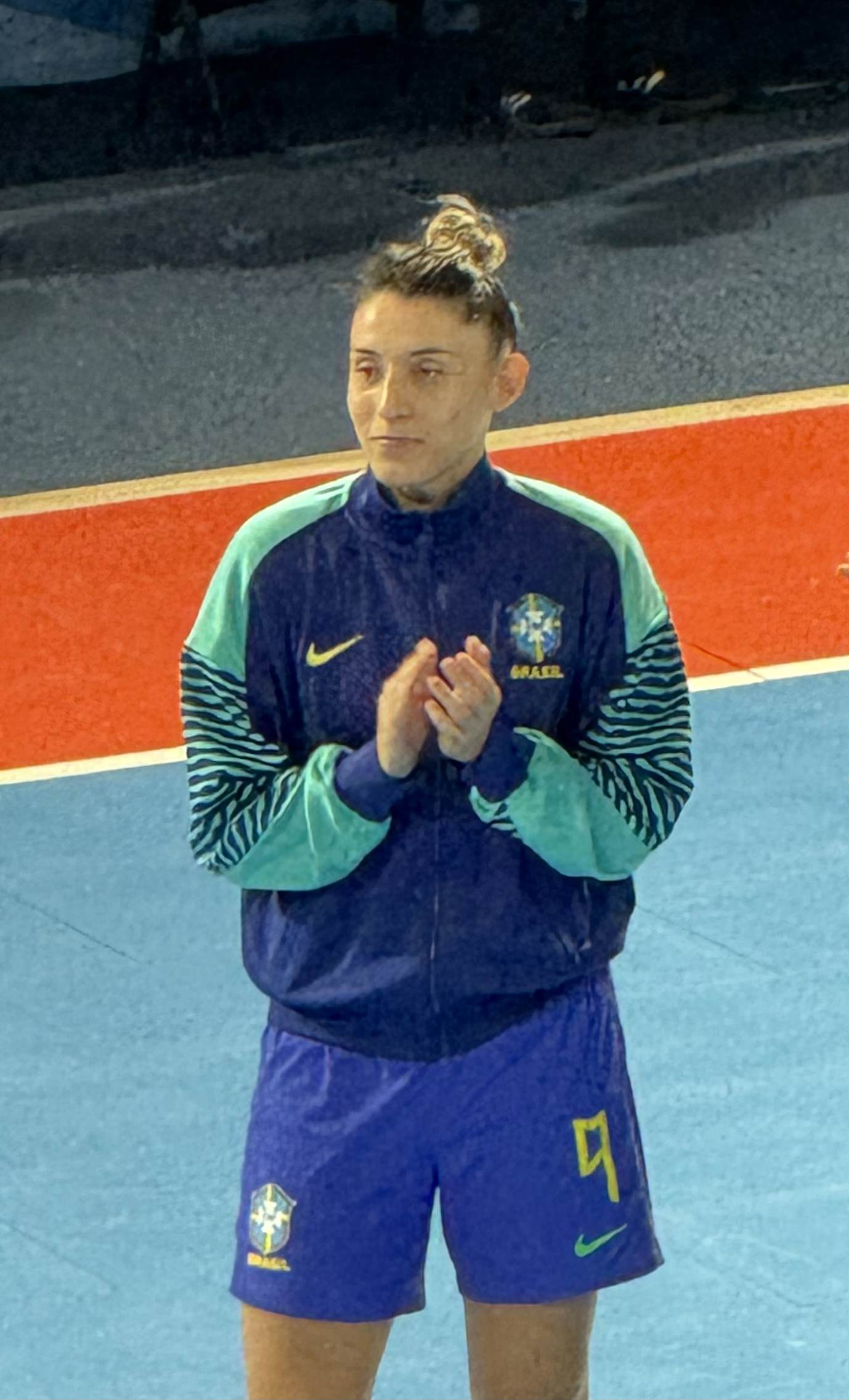
- Emilly at the 2025 FIFA Futsal Women's World Cup

Personal information
- Full name: Emilly Micaela Marcondes
- Date of birth: 6 September 1994 (age 32)
- Place of birth: Paranaguá, Brazil
- Position: Winger

Team information
- Current team: Torreblanca Melilla

International career^{‡}
Years	Team	Apps	(Gls)
- Brazil
Medal record
Women's football
Representing Brazil
FIFA Futsal Women's World Cup
Winner	2025 Philippines
Copa América
Winner	2017 Uruguay
Winner	2023 Argentina
Winner	2025 Brazil
- ‡ National team caps and goals as of 8 April 2025

Emilly Micaela Marcondes (born 6 September 1994), commonly known as Emilly, is a Brazilian professional futsal player who plays as a winger for Torreblanca Melilla and the Brazil women's national team. She was awarded the best female futsal player in 2024 and 2025.

== Club career ==
Marcondes started playing football at the age of five in the street with the boys. At eleven, training became part of her routine. At 14, she went to play for the city club in Telêmaco Borba where she stayed for five years. She also played for Estrela de Guarulhos, in São Paulo, UNIFOR in Ceará, São José in São Paulo and Torreblanca in Spain.

In 2022, Emilly joined Burela, based in Galicia, Spain. With this club, she won two league titles, two Queen's Cups, three Spanish Super Cups and one Galician Cup. She played a key role in these victories and was twice elected best player in the league.

== International career ==
In 2023, Emilly was part of the Brazil women's national team that won the 1st International Women's Futsal Tournament in Xanxerê. She scored one of the three goals in the final of the competition.

Emilly was named to the Brazilian squad for the 2025 FIFA Futsal Women's World Cup on 25 September 2025. Brazil won the tournament, having beaten Portugal 3–0 in the final, with Emilly scoring the opening goal. She was awarded the Golden Ball and the Golden Boot, finishing as the tournament's top scorer with six goals, tied with Spain's Irene Córdoba, but registering more assists than Córdoba.

== Honours ==
Burela

- Primera División: 2022-23, 2023-24
- Copa de la Reina: 2023, 2025
- Supercopa de España: 2022, 2023, 2024

Brazil

- FIFA Futsal Women's World Cup: 2025
- Copa América: 2017, 2023, 2025

Individual

- Futsal Awards Best Female Player in the World: 2024, 2025
- FIFA Futsal Women's World Cup Golden Ball: 2025
- FIFA Futsal Women's World Cup Golden Boot: 2025
