= CONCACAF W Futsal Championship =

International futsal competition

- Organizer(s): CONCACAF
- Founded: 2025; 1 year ago
- Teams: 8
- 2025 CONCACAF W Futsal Championship

The CONCACAF W Futsal Championship (Spanish: Campeonato Concacaf W de Futsal) is the main international futsal competition contested by the senior women's national teams of the member associations of the Confederation of North, Central America and Caribbean Association Football (CONCACAF).

== Adoption ==
Following the launch of the FIFA Futsal Women's World Cup by FIFA in 2022, a qualifying tournament was required within CONCACAF for women's futsal. In October 2024, the FIFA Council set the dates for the competition, scheduling it to take place from April 28 to May 4. However, the tournament's name and branding had not yet been finalized. On February 11, 2025, it was officially announced that the competition would be called the CONCACAF W Futsal Championship, adopting branding consistent with that of the men's tournament.

== Format ==
For the inaugural edition, the tournament format was based on the number of participating teams, which totaled nine. The last two teams to enter competed in a preliminary play-in match to determine the eighth and final spot in the main tournament. The group stage featured eight teams—seven automatic entrants and the play-in winner—divided into two groups of four. Each group played in a single round-robin format, with the top two teams from each group advancing to the semifinals. The winners of the semifinals progressed to the final, where the champion was decided. Both finalists earned qualification to the FIFA Futsal Women's World Cup as CONCACAF representatives.

== Results ==
Ed.	Year	Host	Final			Semi-finalists		Teams
Ed.	Year	Host	Champions	Score	Runners-up	Semi-finalists		Teams
1	2025	Guatemala	Canada	8–2	Panama	Mexico	Costa Rica	8

=== Performance by country ===
Teams reaching the semi-finals
Team	Champions	Runners-up	Semi-finalists
Canada	1 (2025)	–	–
Panama	–	1 (2025)	–
Costa Rica	–	–	1 (2025)
Mexico	–	–	1 (2025)

== Comprehensive team results by tournament ==
Legend

- 1st – Champions
- 2nd – Runners-up
- SF – Semi-finalists
- GS – Group stage
- Q – Qualified for upcoming tournament
- • – Did not qualify
- × – Did not enter / Withdrew / Banned
- – Hosts

For each tournament, the number of teams in each finals tournament are shown (in parentheses).

Team	(Guatemala) 2025 (8)	Total
Canada	1st	1
Costa Rica	SF	1
Cuba	GS	1
Guatemala	GS	1
Honduras	GS	1
Mexico	SF	1
Nicaragua	•	0
Panama	2nd	1
United States	GS	1

== Awards ==
Tournament	Golden Ball	Golden Boot	Goals	Golden Glove	CONCACAF Fair Play Trophy
Guatemala 2025	(Canada) Esther Brossard	(Canada) Esther Brossard	8	(Canada) Léa Palacio-Tellier	Canada

== See also ==
- CONCACAF W Gold Cup
- CONCACAF W Championship
