= Márcia Taffarel =

Brazilian footballer

Personal information
- Date of birth: 15 March 1968 (age 58)
- Place of birth: Bento Gonçalves, Rio Grande do Sul, Brazil
- Position: Midfielder

Senior career*
| Years | Team | Apps | (Gls) |
- Radar
- Saad

International career
| 1996 | Brazil | | |

Managerial career
- 2023–2025: United States (women)
- * Club domestic league appearances and goals

Márcia Taffarel (Bento Gonçalves, 15 March 1968) is a Brazilian former football midfielder who played for the Brazil women's national football team. She competed at the 1991 FIFA Women's World Cup and the 1996 Summer Olympics, playing 5 matches. At the club level, she played for EC Radar and Saad EC. She is cousin to world champion goalkeeper Cláudio Taffarel.

== See also ==
- Brazil at the 1996 Summer Olympics
