= Canada women's national futsal team =

Canada
- Shirt badge/Association crest
- Nickname(s): Les Rouges (The Reds); The Canucks
- Association: Canada Soccer
- Confederation: CONCACAF (North America)
- Head coach: Alexandre Da Rocha
- FIFA code: CAN
- FIFA ranking: 75 (24 September 2026)
Home colours	Away colours

First international
- Costa Rica 3–2 Canada (Guatemala City, Guatemala; 29 April 2025)

Biggest win
- Canada 6–0 Honduras (Guatemala City, Guatemala; 30 April 2025); Panama 2–8 Canada (Guatemala City, Guatemala; 4 May 2025)

Biggest defeat
- Canada 0–7 Spain (Pasig, Philippines; 28 November 2025)

FIFA Futsal Women's World Cup
- Appearances: 1 (First in 2025)
- Best result: TBD

AMF World Cup
- Appearances: 2 (First in 2013)
- Best result: (silver) Runners-up (2022)

CONCACAF W Futsal Championship
- Appearances: 1 (First in 2025)
- Best result: Champions (2025)

The Canada women's national futsal team (French: Équipe du Canada de futsal féminin) represents Canada in international futsal competitions, and is overseen by the Canadian Soccer Association.

== History ==
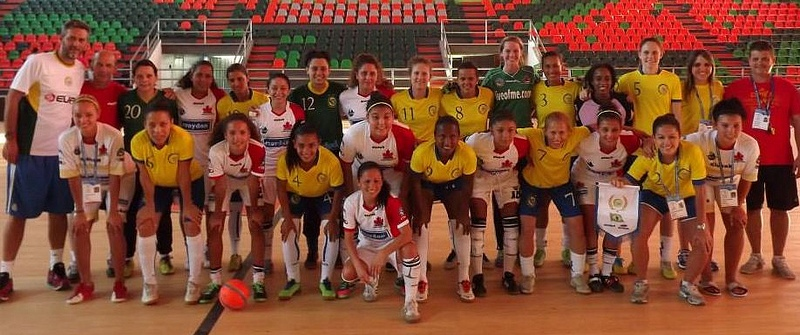
Brazil and Canada's women's futsal national teams in a friendly match in Colombia after both were eliminated from the 2013 AMF Futsal Women's World Cup

After establishing its first local women's championship in April 2023, the Canadian Soccer Association formed its first official women's national futsal team under its governance in January 2025 and appointed Alexandre Da Rocha as the team's first Head Coach. Before establishing this FIFA-affiliated team, Canada had an AMF-affiliated women's futsal team that competed in the AMF Futsal World Cup. The team achieved its best result as runners-up in the 2022 edition.

In the semi-final against Mexico, the Canadian team was trailing 3–0 at half-time, then staged a comeback to level the score at 4–4 by full-time, then winning in a penalty shootout to secure their first qualification for a FIFA Futsal Women's World Cup, set to be held in the Philippines.

Canada faced Panama in the final winning 8–2 to become the inaugural champions of the competition.

== Results and fixtures ==
The following is a list of match results in the last twelve months, as well as any future matches that have been scheduled.

Legend

Win Draw Lose Fixture

=== 2025 ===
14 November Friendly	Poland	5–1	Canada	Manila, Philippines
4:00PM ET	Dymińska 5'; Tracz 16'; Włodarczyk 20' (pen.); He 26' (o.g.); Szostak 31'	Report	He 35'	Stadium: Ninoy Aquino Stadium

16 November Friendly	Argentina	4–2	Canada	Pasig, Philippines
	Ana Ontiveros x2; Agostina Chiesa; Mailén Romero			Stadium: Ynares Sports Arena

22 November FIFA Women's World Cup GS	Colombia	2–0	Canada	Pasig, Philippines
5:00AM ET	Angely Camargo 15'58"; Nicole Mancilla 29'08"	Report		Stadium: PhilSports Arena; Attendance: 414; Referee: Gelareh Nazemi (Iran)

25 November FIFA Women's World Cup GS	Canada	3–6	Thailand	Pasig, Philippines
6:00AM ET	Joelle Gosselin 8'13"; Sasikarn Tongdee 12'26" (o.g.); Maude Lagacé 22'39"	Report	Darika Peanpailun 1'58", 3'58", 24'01"; Sangrawee Meekham 19'53"; Arriya Saetoen 29'43"; Jenjira Bubpha 31'38"	Stadium: PhilSports Arena; Attendance: 307; Referee: María Pinto (Argentina)

28 November FIFA Women's World Cup GS	Canada	0–7	Spain	Pasig, Philippines
8:30AM ET		Report	Antía Pérez 4'45"; Daniela Domingos 9'33"; Laura Córdoba 13'58"; Ale de Paz 14'49"; Cecilia Zarzuela 19'35"; Marta López-Pardo 24'26"; Noelia Montoro 28'31"	Stadium: PhilSports Arena; Attendance: 650; Referee: Nurul Janah (Malaysia)

== Coaching staff ==
=== Current staff ===
As of 31 January 2025

Role	Name	Ref.
Head Coach	(Canada) Alexandre Da Rocha	

== Players ==
=== Current squad ===
The following players were named to the squad for the 2025 FIFA Futsal Women's World Cup to be held in the Philippines from 21 November – 7 December 2025.

No.	Pos.	Player	Date of birth (age)	Club
1	GK	Léa Palacio-Tellier	27 December 1996 (age 29)	(Canadian Soccer Association) Grenadières
14	GK	Jadyn Steinhauer	23 November 1998 (age 27)	(Canadian Soccer Association) SK Impact FC
4	DF	Sophie Thérien	4 April 1993 (age 33)	(Canadian Soccer Association) Montréal Xtreme ADR
5	DF	Maude Lagacé	31 March 2001 (age 25)	(Canadian Soccer Association) Montréal Xtreme ADR
13	DF	Katerine Delev	7 August 2000 (age 26)	(Canadian Soccer Association) Gotham Futsal Club
2	MF	Erika Pion	28 April 1996 (age 30)	(Canadian Soccer Association) Atletico Montréal
3	MF	Jade Houmphanh	14 December 2001 (age 24)	(Canadian Soccer Association) SK Impact FC
6	MF	Shayla He	9 October 2003 (age 23)	(Canadian Soccer Association) Underdogs FC
10	FW	Stephie-Ann Dadaille	6 November 1994 (age 32)	(Canadian Soccer Association) Atletico Montréal
11	MF	Erica Hindmarsh	21 September 1998 (age 28)	(Canadian Soccer Association) SK Impact FC
7	FW	Joëlle Gosselin	23 April 1994 (age 32)	(Canadian Soccer Association) Montréal Xtreme ADR
8	FW	Cynthia Gaspar-Freire	20 April 1995 (age 31)	(Canadian Soccer Association) Montréal Xtreme ADR
9	FW	Esther Brossard	19 May 2006 (age 20)	(United States Soccer Federation) Lehigh University
12	FW	Magali Gagné	26 July 2003 (age 23)	(United States Soccer Federation) Pittsburgh Panthers

=== Recent call-ups ===
The following players have also been called up to the squad within the past 12 months.

No.	Pos.	Player	Date of birth (age)	Club
12	DF	Sadie Sider-Echenberg	4 September 2003 (age 23)	(United States Soccer Federation) Univ. of South Florida
10	MF	Keera Melenhorst	2 May 2003 (age 23)	(United States Soccer Federation) University of Pittsburgh

== Competitive record ==
=== FIFA Futsal Women's World Cup ===
FIFA Futsal Women's World Cup record
Year	Result	Pld	W	D*	L	GF	GA
(Philippines) 2025	Group stage	3	0	0	3	3	15
Total	1/1	3	0	0	3	3	15

*Draws include knockout matches decided on penalty kicks.

=== CONCACAF W Futsal Championship ===
CONCACAF W Futsal Championship record
Year	Result	Pld	W	D*	L	GF	GA
(Guatemala) 2025	Champions	5	3	1	1	23	10
Total	1/1	5	3	1	1	23	10

*Draws include knockout matches decided on penalty kicks.

== See also ==
- Canada women's national soccer team
