= Naomi Matsumoto (futsal player) =

Japanese futsal player (born 1997)

Personal information
- Full name: Naomi Matsumoto
- Date of birth: 22 October 1997 (age 29)
- Place of birth: Tokyo, Japan
- Height: 1.58 m (5 ft 2 in)
- Position: Midfielder

Team information
- Current team: Bardral Urayasu

Youth career
- –: JEF United Chiba U18

Senior career*
Years	Team	Apps	(Gls)
–	Jujo		
2019–2021	Saitama Saicolo		
2021–	Bardral Urayasu		

International career
2021–	Japan		
- * Club domestic league appearances and goals

Naomi Matsumoto (松本 直美, Matsumoto Naomi) is a Japanese futsal player who plays for the Bardral Urayasu and the Japan women's national futsal team.

== Early life ==
Matsumoto was born on 22 October 1997 in Tokyo. She grew up in the Chiba Prefecture and played football throughout elementary and high school.

Matsumoto played for the under-18 women's team of JEF United Chiba. After high school, she quit football and studied in a vocation school to follow the footsteps of her chef father. She went on to work on a hotel in Tokyo.

== Career ==
=== Club ===
At age 20, Matsumoto upon encouragement from friends took up futsal. She started with amateur side Jujo FC before joining Saitama Saicolo in 2019.

In 2021, Matsumoto signed with Bardral Urayasu. She won four consecutive league titles with Bardral Urayasu with the streak being broken in the 2024–25 season where the club finished second place. She also won three Japan Women's Futsal Championship titles.

=== International ===
Matsumoto plays for the Japan women's national futsal team making her first international cap in June 2021. She helped Japan win the 2025 AFC Women's Futsal Asian Cup and qualify for the inaugural 2025 FIFA Futsal Women's World Cup.

== Personal life ==
Matsumoto is a social media influencer who has presence in Instagram and other platforms. She is also a talent who is signed with the entertainment agency Horipro and intends to promote the sport of futsal through this arrangement.

She is also a holder of a chef's license and have catered to weddings of Japanese national football team players.
