= Mexico women's national futsal team =

Mexico
- Shirt badge/Association crest
- Nickname(s): El Tri Femenil de Futsal
- Association: Mexican Football Federation
- Confederation: CONCACAF (North America)
- Head coach: (Argentina) Aldo Da Pozzo
- FIFA code: MEX
- FIFA ranking: 72 ▲1 (8 May 2026)
Home colours	Away colours

First international
- Guatemala 2–7 Mexico (Guatemala City, Guatemala; April 29, 2025)

Biggest win
- Guatemala 2–7 Mexico (Guatemala City, Guatemala; April 29, 2025)

CONCACAF W Futsal Championship
- Appearances: 1 (First in 2025)
- Best result: TBD (2025)

Mexico women's national futsal team (Spanish: Seleccion Nacional de México Femenil de Futsal) represents Mexico in international women's futsal competitions, and is governed by the Mexican Football Federation and competes within CONCACAF.

== History ==
Due to the absence of regional or continental competitions in previous years, the Mexican national team had not been formally established until the announcement of the establishment of the FIFA Women's Futsal World Cup in 2022, with the inaugural edition scheduled for 2025. In February 2025, Mexico registered to participate in the 2025 CONCACAF Women's Futsal Championship, the regional qualifying competition for the finals. This marked the official formation of the women's futsal team, which was largely composed of players from the Queens League. The team made its debut on 29 April 2025, recording a 7–2 victory over host nation Guatemala.

== Players ==
=== Current squad ===
The following 14 players were named to the squad for the 2025 CONCACAF W Futsal Championship, set to take place from 28 April to 4 May 2025.

No.	Pos.	Player	Date of birth (age)	Club
1	GK	Natalia Cano	14 August 2000 (age 25)	(Mexican Football Federation) Tecnológico de Monterrey
12	GK	Fernanda Torres	9 February 1998 (age 28)	Unattached
2	DF	Karen Hernández	28 October 1994 (age 31)	(Mexican Football Federation) Cuervos
3	DF	Mariana González	31 October 2003 (age 22)	(Mexican Football Federation) Tecnológico de Monterrey
4	DF	Kenya Castañeda	22 February 1994 (age 32)	Unattached
6	DF	Nely Ramos	17 June 1997 (age 29)	Unattached
10	DF	Rubí Carrera	24 June 1994 (age 32)	Unattached
14	DF	Ericka Soto	23 September 1997 (age 28)	Unattached
5	MF	Ariatna Dorantes	11 March 2003 (age 23)	(Mexican Football Federation) Tecnológico de Monterrey
7	MF	Paulina Cruz	29 October 2001 (age 24)	(Mexican Football Federation) Tecnológico de Monterrey
11	MF	Itzel Cruz	11 June 1998 (age 28)	(Mexican Football Federation) Cuervos
13	MF	Evelin González	5 December 1996 (age 29)	(Mexican Football Federation) Persas FC
8	FW	Xanic Benítez	2 October 2005 (age 20)	(Mexican Football Federation) Tecnológico de Monterrey
9	FW	Rosa Aguiar	11 April 1995 (age 31)	Unattached

== Competitive record ==
=== FIFA Futsal Women's World Cup ===
FIFA Futsal Women's World Cup record
Year	Position	Pld	W	D*	L	GF	GA
(Philippines) 2025	Did not qualify						
Total	0/1	—	—	—	—	—	—

*Draws include knockout matches decided on penalty kicks.

=== CONCACAF W Futsal Championship ===
CONCACAF W Futsal Championship record
Year	Result	Pld	W	D*	L	GF	GA
(Guatemala) 2025	Semi-finals	4	3	1	0	17	8
Total	1/1	4	3	1	0	17	8

*Draws include knockout matches decided on penalty kicks.

== See also ==
- Mexico women's national football team
