= Katheryn Rodríguez =

Cuban footballer

Personal information
- Full name: Katheryn Rodríguez Valdez
- Date of birth: 10 September 2002 (age 24)
- Position: Forward

Team information
- Current team: Villa Clara

Senior career*
Years	Team	Apps	(Gls)
2021	Pococí	6	(3)
2022–	Villa Clara		

International career^{‡}
2020	Cuba U20	4	(1)
2019–	Cuba	4	(4)
- * Club domestic league appearances and goals as of 15 May 2021. ‡ National team caps and goals as of 29 February 2020

Katheryn Rodríguez Valdez (born 10 September 2002) is a Cuban footballer who plays as a forward for FC Villa Clara and the Cuba women's national team.

== Club career ==
Rodríguez has played for Pococí in Costa Rica and for Villa Clara in Cuba.

== International career ==
Rodríguez capped for Cuba at senior level during the 2020 CONCACAF Women's Olympic Qualifying Championship qualification.

== International goals ==
List of international goals scored by Katheryn Rodríguez
No.	Date	Venue	Opponent	Score	Result	Competition
1.	4 October 2019	National Stadium, Kingston, Jamaica	U.S. Virgin Islands	4–0	6–0	2020 CONCACAF Women's Olympic Qualifying Championship qualification
2.	4 October 2019	National Stadium, Kingston, Jamaica	U.S. Virgin Islands	5–0	6–0	2020 CONCACAF Women's Olympic Qualifying Championship qualification
3.	8 October 2019	National Stadium, Kingston, Jamaica	Saint Lucia	5–1	6–1	2020 CONCACAF Women's Olympic Qualifying Championship qualification
4.	8 October 2019	National Stadium, Kingston, Jamaica	Saint Lucia	6–1	6–1	2020 CONCACAF Women's Olympic Qualifying Championship qualification
5.	22 September 2023	Daren Sammy Cricket Ground, Gros Islet, Saint Lucia	Saint Lucia	1–0	2–1	2024 CONCACAF W Gold Cup qualification
6.	1 March 2026	Estadio Antonio Maceo, Santiago de Cuba, Cuba	Curaçao	1–0	3–0	2026 CONCACAF W Championship qualification
7.	1 March 2026	Estadio Antonio Maceo, Santiago de Cuba, Cuba	Curaçao	2–0	3–0	2026 CONCACAF W Championship qualification
8.	1 March 2026	Estadio Antonio Maceo, Santiago de Cuba, Cuba	Curaçao	3–0	3–0	2026 CONCACAF W Championship qualification
