= Marianela Morales =

Cuban footballer (born 1991)

Personal information
- Full name: Marianela Morales Chacón
- Date of birth: 1 July 1991 (age 35)
- Position: Defender

Senior career*
Years	Team	Apps	(Gls)
2012	La Habana		

International career^{‡}
2009–2010	Cuba U20	7	(0)
2010–	Cuba	9	(0)
- * Club domestic league appearances and goals ‡ National team caps and goals as of 23 January 2012

Marianela Morales Chacón (born 1 July 1991) is a Cuban footballer who plays as a defender for the Cuba women's national team.

== International career ==
Morales capped for Cuba at senior level during the 2010 CONCACAF Women's World Cup Qualifying qualification and the 2012 CONCACAF Women's Olympic Qualifying Tournament (and its qualification).
