= Laurie Batista =

Panamanian footballer (born 1996)

Personal information
- Full name: Laurie Rachel Batista López
- Date of birth: 29 May 1996 (age 30)
- Place of birth: Panama City, Panama
- Height: 1.69 m (5 ft 7 in)
- Position: Midfielder

Team information
- Current team: Tauro

Senior career*
| Years | Team | Apps | (Gls) |
| 2021– | Tauro | | |

International career^{‡}
| 2017– | Panama | 10 | (0) |
- * Club domestic league appearances and goals ‡ National team caps and goals as of 9 July 2019

Laurie Rachel Batista López (born 29 May 1996) is a Panamanian footballer who plays as a midfielder for Tauro FC and the Panama women's national team. She is nicknamed GPS.

== International career ==
Batista appeared in five matches for Panama at the 2018 CONCACAF Women's Championship.

== See also ==
- List of Panama women's international footballers
