= Gloria Sáenz =

Panamanian footballer (born 2002)

Personal information
- Full name: Gloria Estephan Sáenz
- Date of birth: 2 July 2002 (age 24)
- Place of birth: Panama
- Position: Forward

Team information
- Current team: Atlético Nacional

Senior career*
Years	Team	Apps	(Gls)
- Atlético Nacional

International career^{‡}
	Panama	3+	
- * Club domestic league appearances and goals as of 00:38, 29 January 2020 (UTC) ‡ National team caps and goals as of 00:38, 29 January 2020 (UTC)

Gloria Estephan Sáenz (born 2 July 2002) is a Panamanian footballer who plays as a forward for Atlético Nacional and the Panama women's national team.

== Career ==
Sáenz has been capped for the Panama women's national team, making three appearances for the team at the football tournament at the 2019 Pan American Games in Lima, Peru.

== See also ==
- List of Panama women's international footballers
