= Nadia Ducreux =

Panamanian footballer (born 1992)

Personal information
- Full name: Nadia Damaris Ducreux Jiménez
- Date of birth: 26 January 1992 (age 34)
- Place of birth: Chitré, Panama
- Position: Goalkeeper

Team information
- Current team: Sporting San Miguelito

Senior career*
Years	Team	Apps	(Gls)
- Sporting San Miguelito

International career
2021–	Panama		
- * Club domestic league appearances and goals

Nadia Damaris Ducreux Jiménez (born 26 January 1992) is a Panamanian footballer who plays as a goalkeeper for Sporting San Miguelito and the Panama women's national team. She is nicknamed La muralla Ducreux (The wall).
