= Maryorie Pérez =

Panamanian footballer (born 1997)

Personal information
- Full name: Maryorie Nicole Pérez Rodríguez
- Date of birth: 25 November 1997 (age 28)
- Position: Defender

International career^{‡}
Years	Team	Apps	(Gls)
2018	Panama	3	(0)
- ‡ National team caps and goals as of 9 July 2019

Maryorie Nicole Pérez Rodríguez (born 25 November 1997) is a Panamanian footballer who plays as a defender for the Panama women's national team.

== International career ==
Pérez appeared in one match for Panama at the 2018 CONCACAF Women's Championship.

== See also ==
- List of Panama women's international footballers
