= Domo Polideportivo de la CDAG =

Multi-purpose arena in Guatemala City, Guatemala

Coordinates: 14°35′39″N 90°31′56″W

- Domo de la Zona 13
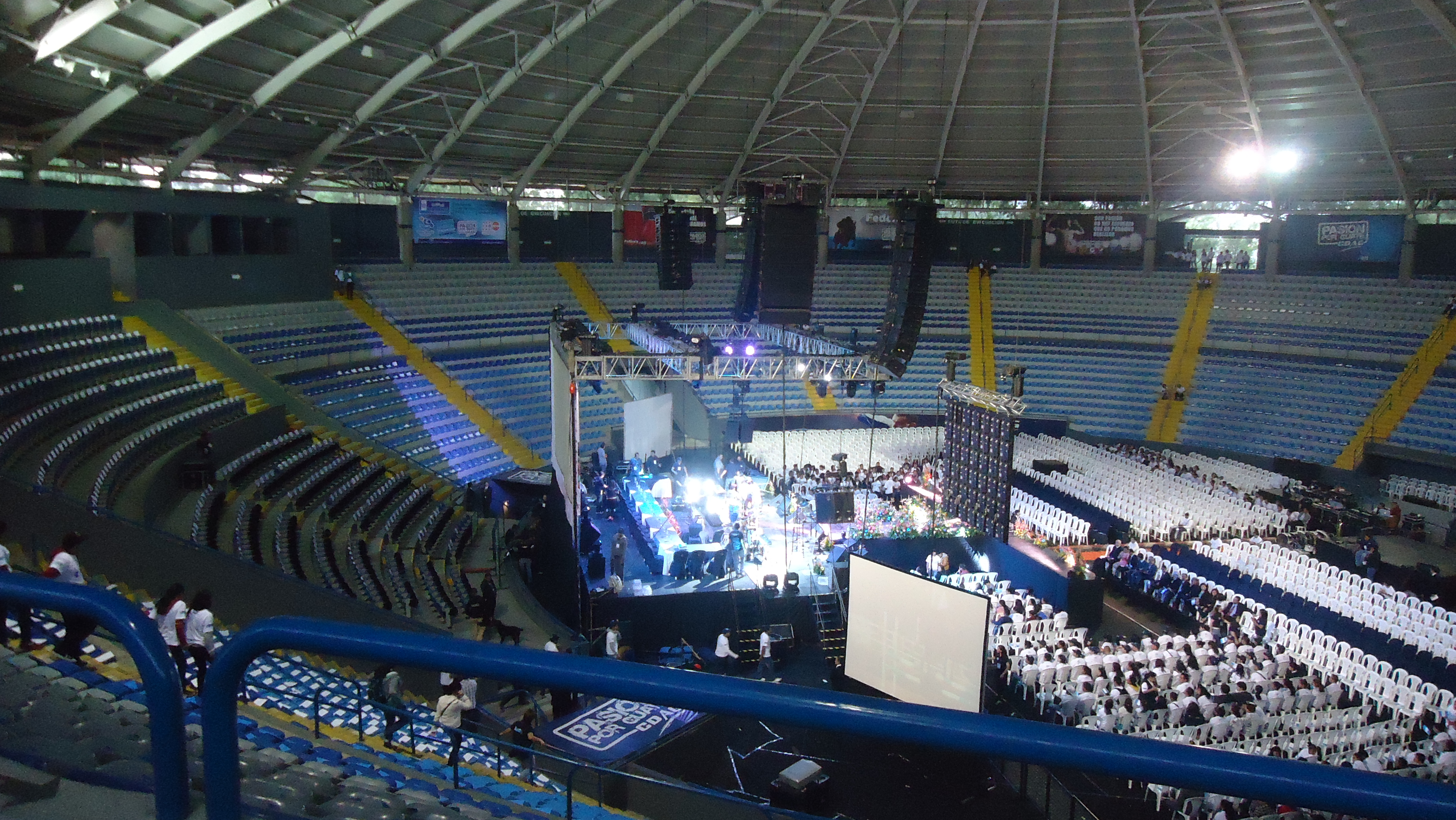
- Interactive map of Domo Polideportivo de la CDAG
- Full name: Domo Polideportivo de la Confederación Deportiva Autónoma de Guatemala
- Location: Guatemala City, Guatemala
- Owner: CDAG
- Operator: CDAG
- Capacity: 7,500

Construction
- Opened: 2000

Tenants
- 2000 FIFA Futsal World Championship; IV CONCACAF Futsal Championship

The Domo Polideportivo de la CDAG, known commonly as Domo de la Zona 13, or simply as Domo (dome, due to the type of its roof structure), is a multi-purpose arena in Guatemala City, Guatemala. Built to host the 2000 FIFA Futsal World Championship, it is located in the Zone 13 of the Guatemalan capital, in the location of the Guatemalan bullring, and has a capacity of 7,500 seats.

The venue is owned and operated by the Confederación Deportiva Autónoma de Guatemala (CDAG), and is also used for musical presentations, as well as cultural and political activities, for which the CDAG leases the site. According to the CDAG, the Dome is a beautiful venue, but the high cost of its operation has affected its role as a sports venue, because most sports federations in the country cannot afford the cost of using it. By 2003, 60 percent of the activities conducted at the Domo were not related to sports.

== Events ==
During the 2000 Futsal World Championship, the Domo hosted 28 of the 40 matches, including all of the second stage and the final stage. Attendance at the Domo averaged 6,728 spectators (89.7%) per match for the tournament, with the highest attendance occurring on the last day of competition, Sunday, December 3, for the Third place and Final matches, when a crowd of 7,568 was registered.

On March 10, 2007, the facility hosted the WWE Raw, a professional wrestling event and World Wrestling Entertainment's most popular show. It was the first time that the event – which is broadcast every Monday on cable television in the United States and internationally – was celebrated in Guatemala.

From June 3 to June 8, 2008, the Domo staged all 16 matches of the IV CONCACAF Futsal Championship, won by Guatemala.

Events and tenants
Preceded by Palau Sant Jordi; Barcelona	FIFA Futsal World Championship; Final Venue; 2000	Succeeded by National Taiwan University Sports Center; Taipei City
