= 2025 FIFA Futsal Women's World Cup =

First edition of Futsal Women's World Cup

Tournament details
- Host country: Philippines
- Dates: November 21 – December 7
- Teams: 16 (from 6 confederations)
- Venue: 1 (in 1 host city)

Final positions
- Champions: Brazil (1st title)
- Runners-up: Portugal
- Third place: Spain
- Fourth place: Argentina

Tournament statistics
- Matches played: 32
- Goals scored: 210 (6.56 per match)
- Attendance: 38,471 (1,202 per match)
- Top scorer(s): (Brazil) Emilly (Spain) Irene Córdoba (7 goals each)
- Best player: (Brazil) Emilly
- Best goalkeeper: (Portugal) Ana Catarina
- Fair play award: Brazil

The 2025 FIFA Futsal Women's World Cup was the inaugural edition of the FIFA Futsal Women's World Cup, an international futsal competition organized by FIFA for women's futsal national teams across the world. It was hosted by the Philippines from November 21 to December 7.

This was the first FIFA tournament hosted by the Philippines, the fifth FIFA tournament held in Southeast Asia, after the 1997 FIFA World Youth Championship in Malaysia, the 2004 FIFA U-19 Women's World Championship and 2012 FIFA Futsal World Cup in Thailand and the 2023 FIFA U-17 World Cup in Indonesia, and the second futsal World Cup in the region.

A total of 16 teams took part. Continental championships decided the qualifiers in every region, with the exception of Europe, which organized its own qualification process. Qualification took place between August 2024 and May 2025. Tanzania qualified for their first-ever senior FIFA tournament, while this was also Iran's first FIFA women's competition.

Brazil were champions of this maiden edition, defeating Portugal in the final and became the first Brazilian women's team to win a FIFA tournament. Besides that pioneering result, they coupled their title with their fellow countrymen's success at the 2024 Futsal World Cup.

== Host selection ==
The World Cup was first announced by FIFA in December 2022. This was followed by countries expressing their interests to host, including Finland.

On May 15, 2024, the Philippines was awarded the hosting rights, beating other bidding nations which include Brazil, Italy, and Spain. The presence and quality of indoor arenas in the Philippines and its successful organization of the 2023 FIBA Basketball World Cup were cited as reasons for the selection.

== Format ==
The 16 teams were divided into four groups of four. The top two teams from each group advanced to the knockout phase, comprising quarter-finals, semi-finals, a third-place play-off, and the final match.

== Qualification ==
Teams qualified Teams failed to qualify Teams withdrew or suspended Did not enter Not a FIFA member

Qualification was decided by continental championships, with the exception of Europe, who organised a standalone qualification process. A total of 80 teams, including the hosts Philippines, participated in the qualification.

=== Slot allocation ===
Alongside the host Philippines, the inaugural 2025 Futsal Women's World Cup slot allocation was as follows:

- AFC (Asia): 4 (including the hosts Philippines)
- CAF (Africa): 2
- CONCACAF (North America, Central America and the Caribbean): 2
- CONMEBOL (South America): 3
- OFC (Oceania): 1
- UEFA (Europe): 4

This was Tanzania's first-ever senior FIFA tournament and Iran's first FIFA women's tournament. Notable absentees included Russia, who were banned from qualification by UEFA due to the country's invasion of Ukraine, and UEFA Women's Futsal Euro 2023 runners-up, Ukraine.

The highest-ranked team to fail to qualify was Vietnam, ranked 11th, (Note: Russia, ranked 10th, was banned from qualifications.) while Tanzania was the lowest-ranked team to make it, placed 82nd.

Qualification tournament	Team	Qualification date	WR
Host nation	Philippines	May 15, 2024	63
2025 AFC Women's Futsal Asian Cup	Japan	May 15, 2025	5
2025 AFC Women's Futsal Asian Cup	Thailand	May 15, 2025	4
2025 AFC Women's Futsal Asian Cup	Iran	May 17, 2025	9
2025 Women's Futsal Africa Cup of Nations	Morocco	April 28, 2025	31
2025 Women's Futsal Africa Cup of Nations	Tanzania	April 28, 2025	82
2025 CONCACAF W Futsal Championship	Canada	May 3, 2025	74
2025 CONCACAF W Futsal Championship	Panama	May 3, 2025	79
2025 Copa América de Futsal Femenina	Argentina	March 29, 2025	6
2025 Copa América de Futsal Femenina	Brazil	March 29, 2025	1
2025 Copa América de Futsal Femenina	Colombia	March 30, 2025	8
2024 OFC Futsal Women's Nations Cup	New Zealand	August 25, 2024	21
2025 FIFA Futsal Women's World Cup qualification (UEFA)	Italy	March 20, 2025	7
2025 FIFA Futsal Women's World Cup qualification (UEFA)	Portugal	March 20, 2025	3
2025 FIFA Futsal Women's World Cup qualification (UEFA)	Spain	March 20, 2025	2
2025 FIFA Futsal Women's World Cup qualification (UEFA)	Poland	March 22, 2025	14

== Venue ==
All matches of the tournament were held at the PhilSports Arena in Pasig, Metro Manila.

Originally, there were two confirmed venues; the other site was the Victorias City Coliseum in Victorias, Negros Occidental. The two venues were approved in January 2025 and confirmed in June 2025. Victorias was dropped as a host city in September 2025.

Other venues considered within Metro Manila were the SM Mall of Asia Arena in Pasay, the Smart Araneta Coliseum in Quezon City and the Ninoy Aquino Stadium in Manila were considered. Outside the metropolis, named venues included the Hoops Dome in Lapu-Lapu City, the Seaside City Arena in Cebu City, and the University of San Agustin Gym in Iloilo City.

Pasig	2025 FIFA Futsal Women's World Cup venue.
PhilSports Arena	2025 FIFA Futsal Women's World Cup venue.
Capacity: 10,000	2025 FIFA Futsal Women's World Cup venue.

== Final draw ==
- 2025 FIFA Futsal Women's World Cup – Draw
- Final draw live stream

The draw was held at 17:00 PHT on September 15, 2025, at the BGC Arts Center in Bonifacio Global City in Taguig. Sports presenter Mara Aquino hosted the draw. The guests were Brazilian futsal legend Falcão, Croatian coach Tihana Nemčić, Filipino international footballer Hali Long, and volleyball player Vanie Gandler, all of whom assisted with the draw. The 16 teams are drawn into four groups of four teams, with the host Philippines automatically seeded to Pot 1 and placed into the first position of Group A. The draw then continued with, in order, pots 1, 2, 3, and 4 being drawn, with each team selected then allocated into the first available group alphabetically. The position for the team within the group would then be drawn (for the purpose of the schedule). The sixteen participating teams were drawn in groups of four. Teams from the same confederation could not be drawn into the same group.

=== Seeding ===
The seeding was based on the women's FIFA Futsal World Rankings that were published on August 29, 2025.

Pot 1
Team	Rank
Philippines (H)	63
Brazil	1
Spain	2
Portugal	3

Pot 2
Team	Rank
Thailand	4
Japan	5
Argentina	6
Italy	7

Pot 3
Team	Rank
Colombia	8
Iran	9
Poland	14
New Zealand	21

Pot 4
Team	Rank
Morocco	31
Canada	74
Panama	79
Tanzania	82

=== Draw results ===
Group A
Pos	Team
A1	Philippines
A2	Poland
A3	Morocco
A4	Argentina

Group B
Pos	Team
B1	Spain
B2	Thailand
B3	Colombia
B4	Canada

Group C
Pos	Team
C1	Portugal
C2	Tanzania
C3	Japan
C4	New Zealand

Group D
Pos	Team
D1	Brazil
D2	Iran
D3	Italy
D4	Panama

== Match officials ==
Confederation	Referees
AFC	(China) Liang Qingyun
AFC	(Iran) Zari Fathi
AFC	(Japan) Kana Saito
AFC	(Iran) Gelareh Nazemi
AFC	(Japan) Mari Yamamoto
AFC	(Malaysia) Nurul Janah
AFC	(Saudi Arabia) Reem Al-Bishi
AFC	(Thailand) Panadda Khotsenaphattra
CONCACAF	(Costa Rica) Yeraldin Araya
CONCACAF	(Costa Rica) Kimberly Valverde
CONCACAF	(United States) Krystin Pahia
CONMEBOL	(Argentina) María Pinto
CONMEBOL	(Brazil) Anelize Schultz
CONMEBOL	(Chile) Valeria Palma
CONMEBOL	(Colombia) Yendis Montalvo
CONMEBOL	(Paraguay) María Cáceres
CONMEBOL	(Venezuela) Tayana Moreno
CONMEBOL	(Venezuela) Oriana Zambrano

Confederation	Referees
UEFA	(Croatia) Marijana Orešić
UEFA	(Czech Republic) Alice Vévodová
UEFA	(Kosovo) Florentina Kallaba
UEFA	(Italy) Martina Piccolo
UEFA	(Poland) Monika Czudzinowicz
UEFA	(Portugal) Filipa Prata
UEFA	(Spain) Noelia Gutiérrez Muñoz
UEFA	(Ukraine) Mariia Myslovska

== Squads ==
Each team had to name a preliminary squad of a maximum of 30 players (three of whom must be goalkeepers). From the preliminary squad, the team had to name a final squad of 14 players (two of whom must be goalkeepers) by the FIFA deadline. Players in the final squad could be replaced by a player from the preliminary squad due to serious injury or illness up to 24 hours before the kickoff of the team's first match.

== Opening ceremony ==
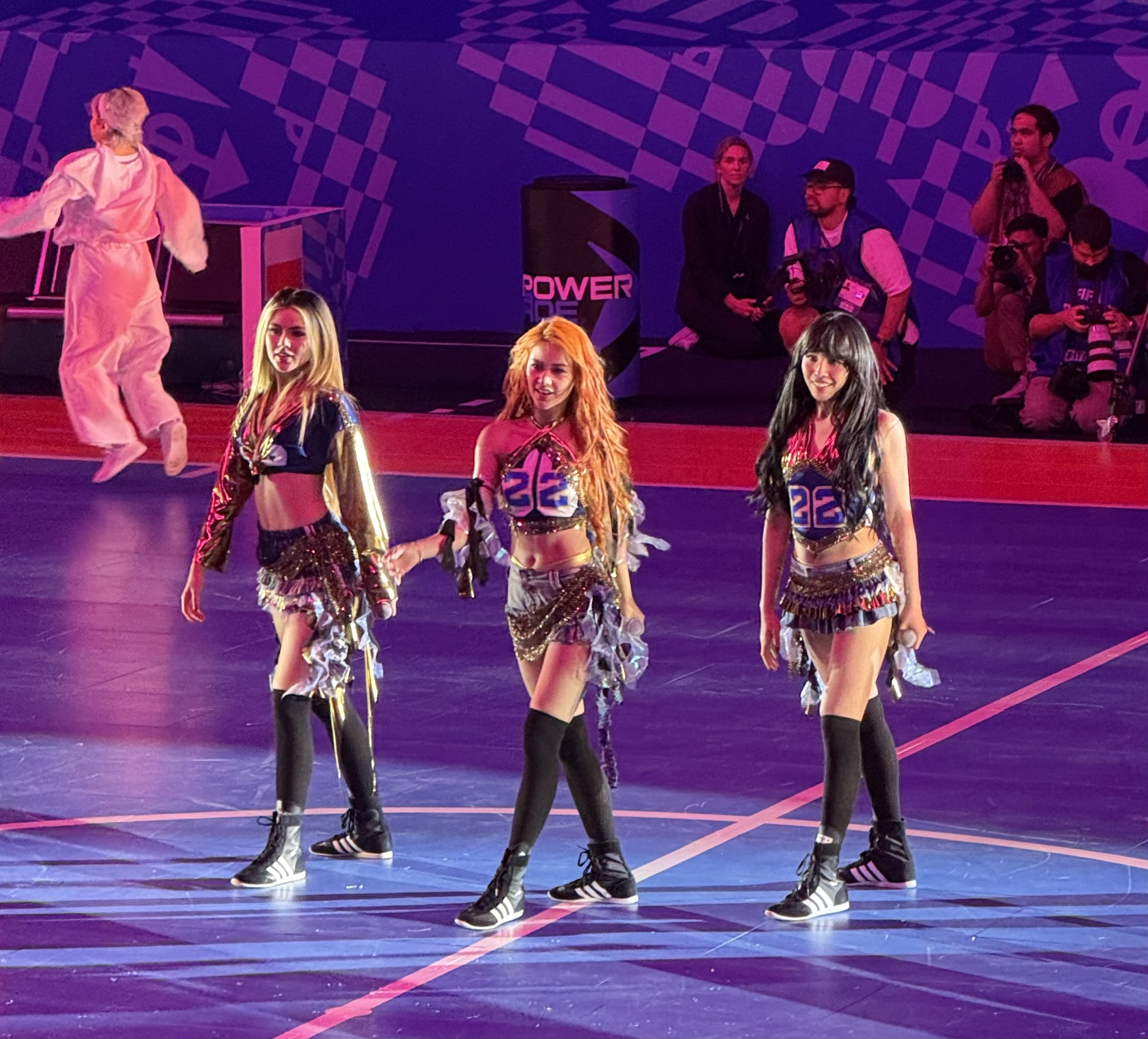
G22 during the opening ceremony

The opening ceremony was held shortly prior to the second match between hosts Philippines and Poland. The event was attended by FIFA president Gianni Infantino along with Philippine Football Federation president John Gutierrez, Philippine Sports Commission chairperson Patrick Gregorio, and Pasig mayor Vico Sotto. Filipino girl group G22 performed during the event.

== Group stage ==
All times are local, PHT (UTC+8). The schedule was announced following the draw.

The top two teams of each group advanced to the quarter-finals.

=== Tiebreakers ===
The rankings of teams in each group were determined as follows:

1. points obtained in all group matches;
2. points obtained in the matches played between the teams in question;
3. goal difference in the matches played between the teams in question;
4. number of goals scored in the matches played between the teams in question;

If two or more teams were equal on the basis of the above four criteria, their rankings were determined as follows:

5. goal difference in all group matches;
6. number of goals scored in all group matches;
7. fair play points in all group matches (only one deduction could be applied to a person in a single match):
  - Yellow card: −1 points;
  - Indirect red card (second yellow card): −3 points;
  - Direct red card: −4 points;
  - Yellow card and direct red card: −5 points;
8. drawing of lots by FIFA.

=== Group A ===
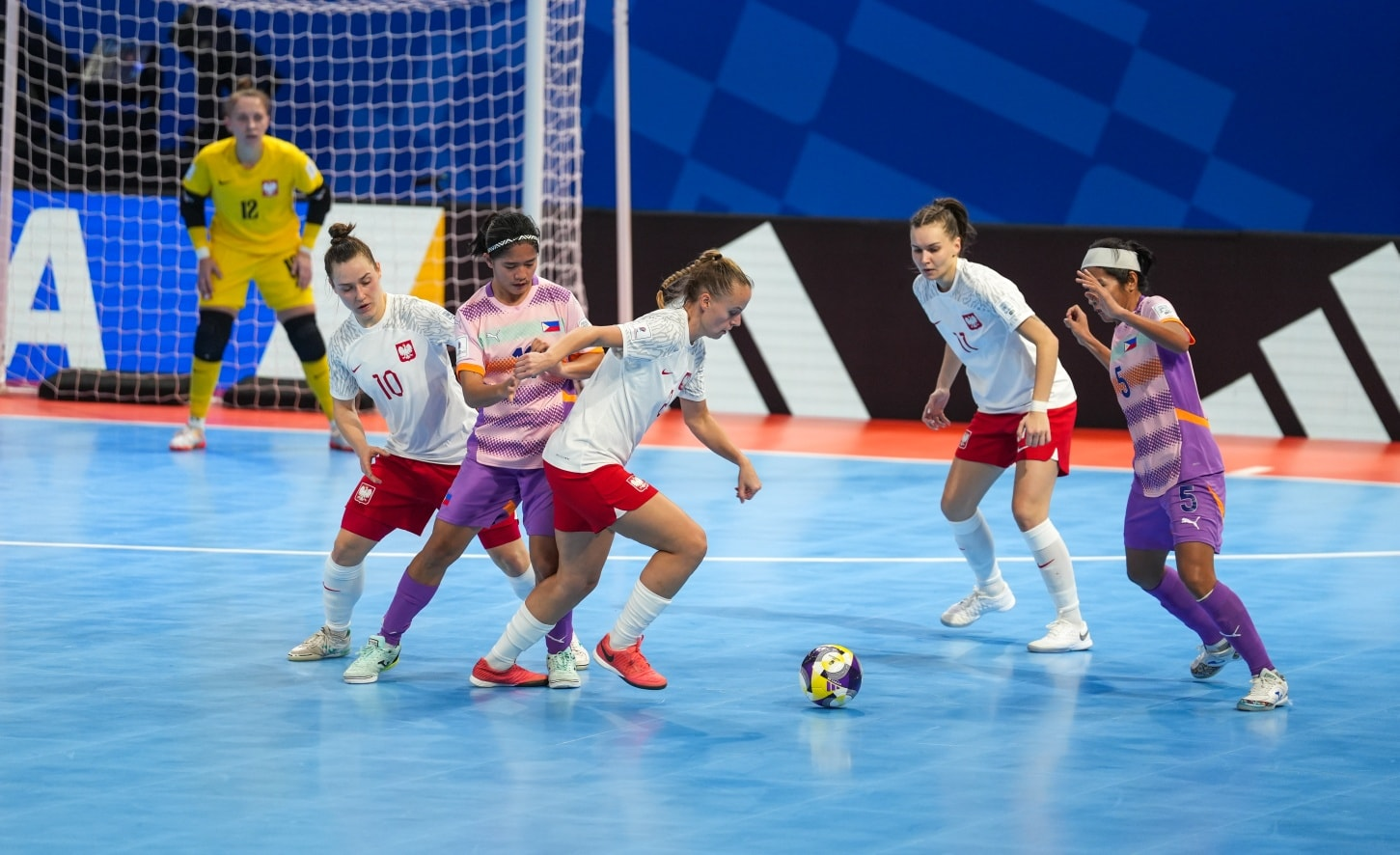
Philippines v Poland

Pos	Team	Pld	W	D	L	GF	GA	GD	Pts	Qualification
1	Argentina	3	3	0	0	14	3	+11	9	Knockout stage
2	Morocco	3	2	0	1	4	8	−4	6	Knockout stage
3	Poland	3	1	0	2	8	4	+4	3	
4	Philippines (H)	3	0	0	3	3	14	−11	0	

Source: FIFA
(H) Hosts
November 21, 2025
18:00

Morocco	0–6	Argentina
	Report	Ontiveros 14'56"; Chiesa 15'36"; Romero 16'47"; Natta 17'30"; Villalba 20'39"; Dupuy 28'48"

PhilSports Arena, Pasig
Attendance: 1,378
Referee: Martina Piccolo (Italy)
November 21, 2025
20:30

Philippines	0–6	Poland
	Report	Basta 6'19", 23'55"; Matuszewska 18'18"; Szostak 22'18"; Ortillo 25'50" (o.g.); Dymińska 29'53"

PhilSports Arena, Pasig
Attendance: 2,211
Referee: Anelize Schultz (Brazil)

November 24, 2025
18:00

Argentina	3–2	Poland
Nava 8'04"; Chiesa 10'32"; Rossi 14'02"	Report	Bała 21'48"; Chóras 38'24"

PhilSports Arena, Pasig
Attendance: 955
Referee: Liang Qingyun (China)
November 24, 2025
20:30

Philippines	2–3	Morocco
Tolentin 3'53"; Graversen 7'01"	Report	Laftah 9'47"; Tadlaoui 13'55"; Demraoui 16'56"

PhilSports Arena, Pasig
Attendance: 1,771
Referee: Alice Vévodová (Czech Republic)

November 27, 2025
18:00

Poland	0–1	Morocco
	Report	Demraoui 28'13"

PhilSports Arena, Pasig
Attendance: 1,125
Referee: Valeria Palma (Chile)
November 27, 2025
20:30

Argentina	5–1	Philippines
Villalba 1'35"; Romero 3'15"; Natta 3'57"; Chiesa 6'07"; Quevedo 6'56"	Report	Bandoja 27'24"

PhilSports Arena, Pasig
Attendance: 2,811
Referee: Krystin Pahia (United States)

=== Group B ===
Pos	Team	Pld	W	D	L	GF	GA	GD	Pts	Qualification
1	Spain	3	3	0	0	17	3	+14	9	Knockout stage
2	Colombia	3	2	0	1	7	6	+1	6	Knockout stage
3	Thailand	3	1	0	2	9	12	−3	3	
4	Canada	3	0	0	3	3	15	−12	0	

Source: FIFA
November 22, 2025
17:00

Colombia	2–0	Canada
Camargo 15'58"; Mancilla 29'08"	Report

PhilSports Arena, Pasig
Attendance: 414
Referee: Gelareh Nazemi (Iran)
November 22, 2025
19:30

Spain	5–2	Thailand
Sotelo 6'08"; I. Córdoba 10'26"; L. Córdoba 15'11", 27'34"; Navarro 31'11"	Report	Jenjira 8'18"; Sasikarn 13'51"

PhilSports Arena, Pasig
Attendance: 759
Referee: Kimberly Valverde (Costa Rica)

November 25, 2025
18:00

Canada	3–6	Thailand
Gosselin 8'13"; Sasikarn 12'26" (o.g.); Lagacé 22'39"	Report	Darika 1'58", 3'58", 24'01"; Sangrawee 19'53"; Arriya 29'43"; Jenjira 31'38"

PhilSports Arena, Pasig
Attendance: 307
Referee: María Pinto (Argentina)
November 25, 2025
20:30

Spain	5–1	Colombia
Samper 1'08"; Sotelo 5'30", 14'20" (2pen.); Pérez 6'16"; I. Córdoba 28'25"	Report	I. Córdoba 31'13" (o.g.)

PhilSports Arena, Pasig
Attendance: 398
Referee: Kana Saito (Japan)

November 28, 2025
18:00

Thailand	1–4	Colombia
Arriya 10'22"	Report	Celis 3'59"; Salcedo 7'25", 22'31"; Rodríguez 34'45"

PhilSports Arena, Pasig
Attendance: 404
Referee: Marijana Orešić (Croatia)
November 28, 2025
20:30

Canada	0–7	Spain
	Report	Pérez 4'45"; Domingos 9'33"; L. Córdoba 13'58"; De Paz 14'49"; Zarzuela 19'35"; López-Pardo 24'26"; Montoro 28'31"

PhilSports Arena, Pasig
Attendance: 650
Referee: Nurul Janah (Malaysia)

=== Group C ===
Pos	Team	Pld	W	D	L	GF	GA	GD	Pts	Qualification
1	Portugal	3	3	0	0	23	1	+22	9	Knockout stage
2	Japan	3	2	0	1	16	3	+13	6	Knockout stage
3	Tanzania	3	1	0	2	4	21	−17	3	
4	New Zealand	3	0	0	3	2	20	−18	0	

Source: FIFA
November 23, 2025
12:00

Japan	6–0	New Zealand
Oino 1'44", 26'44"; Amishiro 12'37"; Ikadai 23'33"; Egawa 26'17"; Miyahara 31'41"	Report

PhilSports Arena, Pasig
Attendance: 503
Referee: Oriana Zambrano (Venezuela)
November 23, 2025
14:30

Portugal	10–0	Tanzania
Pereira 3'21"; Azevedo 5'38"; Kaka 6'41"; Matos 11'14"; Fifó 13'55"; Kika 16'00"; Maonyo 20'24" (o.g.); Nunes 20'48"; Moreira 23'57"; Pedreira 31'52"	Report

PhilSports Arena, Pasig
Attendance: 347
Referee: Reem Al-Bishi (Saudi Arabia)

November 26, 2025
13:00

New Zealand	2–4	Tanzania
Kraakman 18'05"; Verdon 26’34"	Report	Siyame 10'41", 21'51", 39'55"; Charles 26'20"

PhilSports Arena, Pasig
Attendance: 233
Referee: Monika Czudzinowicz (Poland)
November 26, 2025
15:30

Portugal	3–1	Japan
Azevedo 15'06", 39'32"; Kaka 15'55"	Report	Oino 36'04"

PhilSports Arena, Pasig
Attendance: 435
Referee: Tayana Moreno (Venezuela)

November 29, 2025
12:00

Tanzania	0–9	Japan
	Report	Egawa 0'59", 33'44"; Matsumoto 3'23"; Nakamura 17'13" (2pen.); Ito 23'49"; Iwasaki 25'45", 26'26"; Takahashi 26'59"; Amishiro 32'34"

PhilSports Arena, Pasig
Attendance: 314
Referee: Yeraldin Araya (Costa Rica)
November 29, 2025
14:30

New Zealand	0–10	Portugal
	Report	Silva 2'26", 12'40"; Lavrador 7'03"; Fifó 13'00", 13'20"; Matos 17'57"; Pereira 22'39"; Kaka 22'46"; Martinha 32'31"; Pretty 38'24" (o.g.)

PhilSports Arena, Pasig
Attendance: 387
Referee: Panadda Khotsenaphattra (Thailand)

=== Group D ===
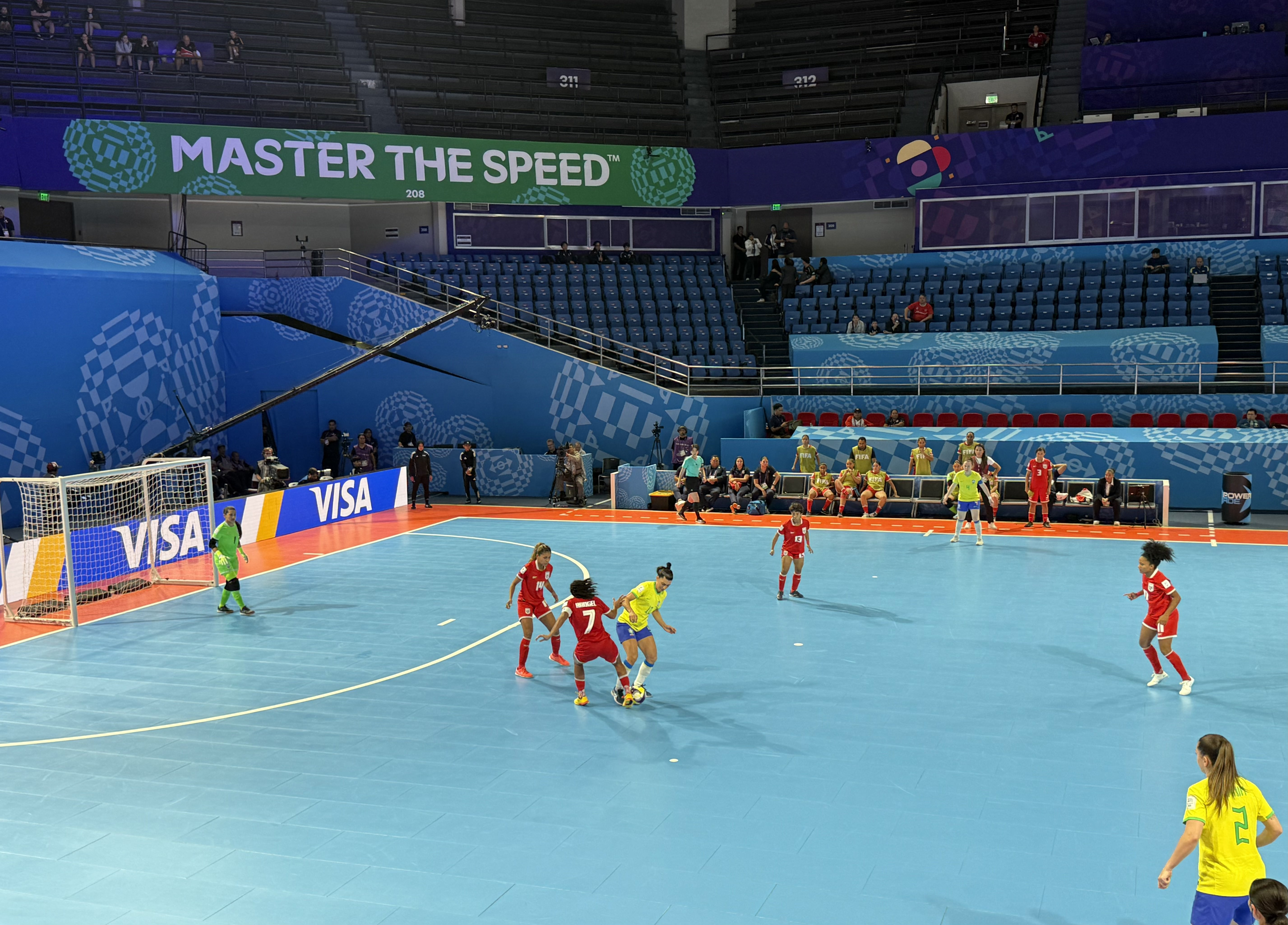
Panama v Brazil

Pos	Team	Pld	W	D	L	GF	GA	GD	Pts	Qualification
1	Brazil	3	3	0	0	19	2	+17	9	Knockout stage
2	Italy	3	2	0	1	21	7	+14	6	Knockout stage
3	Iran	3	1	0	2	8	9	−1	3	
4	Panama	3	0	0	3	2	32	−30	0	

Source: FIFA
November 23, 2025
17:00

Italy	17–0	Panama
Boutimah 2'44", 22'32", 36'08"; Ghilardi 9'21", 33'13"; Adamatti 9'53", 26'50", 33'36" (pen.); Ferrara 14'52" (pen.); Dal'Maz 26'17", 27'34"; Bettioli 27'31", 34'43"; Vanelli 30'30", 34'54"; Berté 35'52"; Grieco 39'07"	Report

PhilSports Arena, Pasig
Attendance: 487
Referee: Yendis Montalvo (Colombia)
November 23, 2025
19:30

Brazil	4–1	Iran
Ana Luiza 14'37"; Débora 16'13"; Emilly 20'59", 23'10"	Report	Kamali 24'28"

PhilSports Arena, Pasig
Attendance: 823
Referee: Noelia Gutiérrez Muñoz (Spain)

November 26, 2025
18:00

Panama	2–6	Iran
Rangel 17'11"; Pérez 30'46"	Report	Anafjeh 1'47"; Gholami 8'19"; Karimi 11'46", 36'02"; Khosravi 28'54"; Rahmati 36'27"

PhilSports Arena, Pasig
Attendance: 418
Referee: Florentina Kallaba (Kosovo)
November 26, 2025
20:30

Brazil	6–1	Italy
Ana Luiza 0'31"; Emilly 11'19"; Amandinha 21'12", 21'54"; Débora 26'56"; Camila 27'15"	Report	Adamatti 6'39"

PhilSports Arena, Pasig
Attendance: 1,128
Referee: Mariia Myslovska (Ukraine)

November 29, 2025
17:00

Iran	1–3	Italy
Tavassoli 9'25"	Report	Berté 29'06"; Borges 29'26"; Moghimi 34'39" (o.g.)

PhilSports Arena, Pasig
Attendance: 1,113
Referee: María Pinto (Argentina)
November 29, 2025
19:30

Panama	0–9	Brazil
	Report	Rangel 0'36" (o.g.); Camila 3'15"; Débora 5'09"; Tampa 6'32", 34'44", 36'45"; Luciléia 14'37", 17'15"; Simone 19'13"

PhilSports Arena, Pasig
Attendance: 564
Referee: Kana Saito (Japan)

== Knockout stage ==
=== Bracket ===
Quarter-finals
December 1
Argentina	4
Colombia	1
December 2
Portugal	7
Italy	2
December 1
Spain	6
Morocco	1
December 2
Brazil	6
Japan	1

Semi-finals
December 5
Argentina	1
Portugal	7
December 5
Spain	1
Brazil	4

Final
December 7
Portugal	0
Brazil	3
Third place match
December 7
Argentina	1
Spain	5

=== Quarter-finals ===
December 1, 2025
18:00

Argentina	4–1	Colombia
Rossi 4'05", 8'10"; Nuñez 5'15"; Nava 27'57"	Report	Bustos 11'35"

PhilSports Arena, Pasig
Attendance: 769
Referee: Mariia Myslovska (Ukraine)

December 1, 2025
20:30

Spain	6–1	Morocco
I. Córdoba 0'14", 0'29", 1'26", 20'36"; López-Pardo 33'51"; Samper 36'53"	Report	Laftah 12'32"

PhilSports Arena, Pasig
Attendance: 880
Referee: Zari Fathi (Iran)

December 2, 2025
18:00

Portugal	7–2	Italy
Pedreira 5'22"; Moreira 5'42", 20'58", 34'30"; Silva 23'25", 38'31"; Kika 27'20"	Report	Ferrara 9'27" (pen.); Boutimah 28'36"

PhilSports Arena, Pasig
Attendance: 898
Referee: Oriana Zambrano (Venezuela)

December 2, 2025
20:30

Brazil	6–1	Japan
Emilly 3'18", 10'05", 38'38"; Ana Luiza 8'50"; Débora 12'07"; Luana 13'52"	Report	Júlia 35'49" (o.g.)

PhilSports Arena, Pasig
Attendance: 1,383
Referee: Kimberly Valverde (Costa Rica)

=== Semi-finals ===
December 5, 2025
18:00

Argentina	1–7	Portugal
Romero 38'13"	Report	Moreira 0'57", 8'08"; Fifó 6'14", 9'52"; Silva 9'06"; Azevedo 14'27"; Matos 20'45"

PhilSports Arena, Pasig
Attendance: 1,618
Referee: Tayana Moreno (Venezuela)

December 5, 2025
20:30

Spain	1–4	Brazil
De Paz 26'07"	Report	Ana Luiza 0'51"; Amandinha 1'01"; Débora 25'24"; Luana 32'13"

PhilSports Arena, Pasig
Attendance: 3,003
Referee: Valeria Palma (Chile)

=== Third place match ===
December 7, 2025
17:00

Argentina	1–5	Spain
Romero 33'45"	Report	De Paz 4'18"; Pérez 36'53"; L. Córdoba 34'46", 39'18"; I. Córdoba 37'37"

PhilSports Arena, Pasig
Attendance: 4,898
Referee: Kimberly Valverde (Costa Rica)

=== Final ===
December 7, 2025
19:30

Portugal	0–3	Brazil
	Report	Emilly 9'46"; Amandinha 22'25"; Débora 37'51"

PhilSports Arena, Pasig
Attendance: 5,087
Referee: Oriana Zambrano (Venezuela)

== Statistics ==
=== Goalscorers ===
There were 210 goals scored in 32 matches, for an average of 6.56 goals per match.

7 goals

- (Brazil) Emilly
- (Spain) Irene Córdoba

6 goals

- (Brazil) Débora Vanin
- (Portugal) Lídia Moreira

5 goals

- (Portugal) Fifó
- (Portugal) Janice Silva
- (Spain) Laura Córdoba

4 goals

- (Argentina) Mailén Romero
- (Brazil) Amandinha
- (Brazil) Ana Luiza
- (Italy) Renata Adamatti
- (Italy) Sara Boutimah
- (Portugal) Ana Azevedo

3 goals

- (Argentina) Agostina Chiesa
- (Argentina) Lucía Rossi
- (Brazil) Tampa
- (Japan) Ryo Egawa
- (Japan) Sara Oino
- (Portugal) Kaka
- (Portugal) Inês Matos
- (Spain) Ale de Paz
- (Spain) Antía Pérez
- (Spain) Vane Sotelo
- (Tanzania) Mary Siyame
- (Thailand) Darika Peanpailun

2 goals

- (Argentina) Luciana Natta
- (Argentina) Silvina Nava
- (Argentina) Lara Villalba
- (Brazil) Camila
- (Brazil) Luana
- (Brazil) Luciléia
- (Colombia) Merlin Salcedo
- (Italy) Erika Ferrara
- (Iran) Fereshteh Karimi
- (Italy) Adrieli Berté
- (Italy) Brenda Bettioli
- (Italy) Rafaela Dal'Maz
- (Italy) Greta Ghilardi
- (Italy) Gaby Vanelli
- (Japan) Anna Amishiro
- (Japan) Yuka Iwasaki
- (Morocco) Jasmine Demraoui
- (Morocco) Nadia Laftah
- (Poland) Julia Basta
- (Portugal) Kika
- (Portugal) Carolina Pedreira
- (Portugal) Maria Pereira
- (Spain) Marta López-Pardo
- (Spain) Irene Samper
- (Thailand) Jenjira Bubpha
- (Thailand) Arriya Saetoen

1 goal

- (Argentina) Julia Dupuy
- (Argentina) Carina Nuñez
- (Argentina) Ana Ontiveros
- (Argentina) Melina Quevedo
- (Brazil) Simone
- (Canada) Joelle Gosselin
- (Canada) Maude Lagacé
- (Colombia) Angely Camargo
- (Colombia) Laura Bustos
- (Colombia) Diana Celis
- (Colombia) Danna Rodríguez
- (Colombia) Nicole Mancilla
- (Iran) Elham Anafjeh
- (Iran) Nasimeh Gholami
- (Iran) Fereshteh Khosravi
- (Iran) Fatemeh Rahmati
- (Iran) Farzaneh Tavassoli
- (Iran) Mahsa Kamali
- (Italy) Bruna Borges
- (Italy) Alessia Grieco
- (Japan) Risa Ikadai
- (Japan) Kaho Ito
- (Japan) Naomi Matsumoto
- (Japan) Yukari Miyahara
- (Japan) Mizuki Nakamura
- (Japan) Kyoka Takahashi
- (Morocco) Siiham Tadlaoui
- (New Zealand) Hannah Kraakman
- (New Zealand) Jess Verdon
- (Panama) Maryorie Pérez
- (Panama) Kenia Rangel
- (Philippines) Isabella Bandoja
- (Philippines) Cathrine Graversen
- (Philippines) Dionesa Tolentin
- (Poland) Agata Bała
- (Poland) Anna Chóras
- (Poland) Klaudia Dymińska
- (Poland) Natalia Matuszewska
- (Poland) Julia Szostak
- (Portugal) Débora Lavrador
- (Portugal) Martinha
- (Portugal) Helena Nunes
- (Spain) Daniela Domingos
- (Spain) Noelia Montoro
- (Spain) María Sanz Navarro
- (Spain) Cecilia Zarzuela
- (Tanzania) Winfrida Charles
- (Thailand) Sangrawee Meekham
- (Thailand) Sasikarn Tongdee

1 own goal

- (Brazil) Júlia (against Japan)
- (Iran) Nastaran Moghimi (against Italy)
- (New Zealand) Catherine Pretty (against Portugal)
- (Panama) Kenia Rangel (against Brazil)
- (Philippines) Lanie Ortillo (against Poland)
- (Tanzania) Fatuma Issa Maonyo (against Portugal)
- (Spain) Irene Córdoba (against Colombia)
- (Thailand) Sasikarn Tongdee (against Canada)

=== Discipline ===
A player was automatically suspended for the next match for the following offences:

- Receiving a red card (red card suspensions could be extended for serious offences)
- Receiving two yellow cards in two matches; yellow cards expired after the completion of the quarter-finals (yellow card suspensions were not carried forward to any other future international matches)

The following suspensions were served during the tournament:

Player	Offence(s)	Suspension(s)
(Tanzania) Zawadi Athuman	Card incurred prior to tournament	Group C vs Portugal (matchday 1; November 23)
(Argentina) Silvina Nava	(yellow card) (yellow-red card) in Group A vs Poland (matchday 2; November 24)	Group A vs Philippines (matchday 3; November 27)
(Tanzania) Gelwa Lugomba	(red card) in Group C vs Portugal (matchday 2; November 26)	Group C vs Japan (matchday 3; November 29)
(Italy) Nicoletta Mansueto	(red card) in Group D vs Brazil (matchday 2; November 26)	Group D vs Iran (matchday 3; November 29)

== Awards ==
The following awards were given at the conclusion of the tournament. They were all sponsored by Adidas, except for the FIFA Fair Play Trophy.

Golden Ball	Silver Ball	Bronze Ball
(Brazil) Emilly	(Brazil) Débora Vanin	(Portugal) Lídia Moreira
Golden Boot	Silver Boot	Bronze Boot
(Brazil) Emilly (7 goals, 2 assists)	(Spain) Irene Córdoba (7 goals, 1 assist)	(Portugal) Lídia Moreira (6 goals, 3 assists)
Golden Glove
(Portugal) Ana Catarina
FIFA Fair Play Trophy
Brazil

== Marketing ==
=== Logo and slogan ===
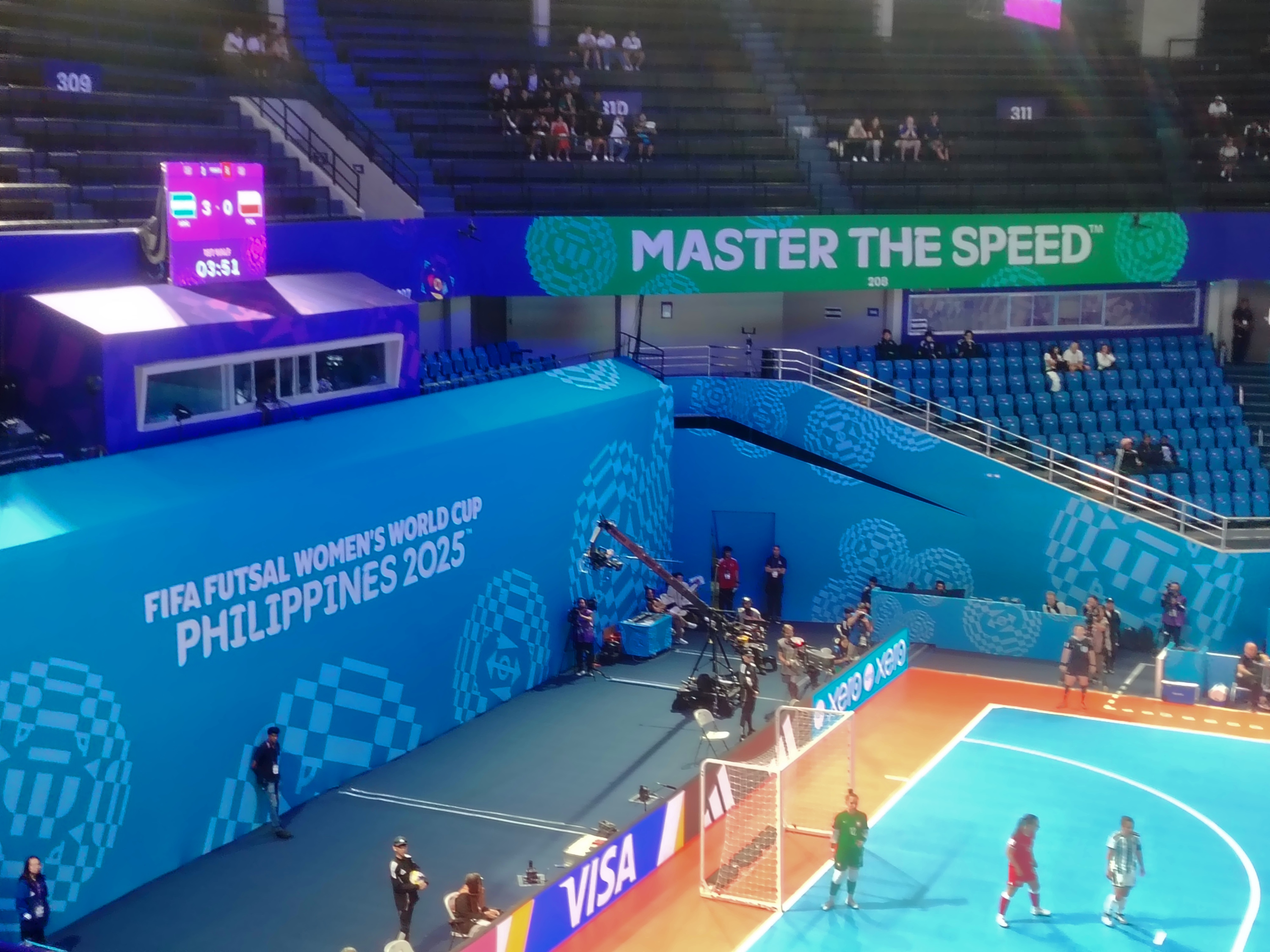
Branding at the PhilSports Arena with a banner of the official slogan "Master The Speed"

The official emblem was launched on March 18, 2025, at the Manila House in Bonifacio Global City, Taguig.

The emblem is a combination of visual elements depicting futsal and references to street art and motifs in the Philippines. Some of the Filipino culture references featured in the logo include the vinta, the gabbang instrument, and traditional Binakael patterns.

The visual identity accompanying the logo, alongside the official slogan of the tournament, "Master The Speed", reflects a game that is constantly on the move and the sights and sounds of the host nation, which are combined with depictions of the futsal ball, the shape of the pitch, and the five members of each team. The design also features arrows that portray the fine line between defense and attack in a form of football renowned for its captivating speed and skill.

=== Mascot ===
Diwa
- 2025 FIFA Futsal Women's World Cup mascot
- "Diwa™ unveiled as Official Mascot of the FIFA Futsal Women’s World Cup Philippines 2025™" from FIFA; shows initially unveiled 3D rendition and live mascot version of Diwa
- Instagram post for a mascot meet-and-greet event at the 2025 Batang Pinoy Closing Ceremony! from the Philippine Football Federation showing a 2D rendition of Diwa

Diwa was the official mascot of the 2025 FIFA Futsal Women's World Cup. The mascot was a futsal player and is characterized as a "spirited girl with close ties to nature" who represents the values of teamwork, power, and grace. Her design is inspired by the diwata, a fairy from Philippine folklore. She was unveiled on August 30, 2025, at the San Joaquin Elementary School in Pasig during a community event.

=== Broadcasting rights ===
Territory	Rights holder(s)	Ref.
Worldwide	FIFA+	
Philippines	Cignal TV; FIFA+; One Sports; RPTV	
Mexico	Tudn Mexico y Canal 5 Mexico	

== Controversies ==
=== Neglect of Philippine team ===
According to a report from Spin.ph, several players from the Philippine team stated they were "billeted in substandard quarters" and "with no potable water and inadequate food" as they trained before the start of the tournament. An unnamed player reportedly "nearly fainted from hunger" after "having fasted for many hours as she waited for a blood test". There were also days when "no shuttle service was available for the team". When players complained regarding their accommodation, some of them allegedly had to pay for alternative housing. The team also had no strength and conditioning coach, nor a nutritionist. This led to some players resorting to buying from food delivery services themselves. A representative from the Philippine Football Federation (PFF) reached out to publishing website of the article and said that "no such issues were relayed to the association".

== See also ==
- 2024 FIFA Futsal World Cup
