= Kenia Rangel =

Panamanian footballer (born 1995)

Personal information
- Full name: Kenia Kristel Rangel Villarreal
- Date of birth: 6 August 1995 (age 31)
- Place of birth: Panama City, Panama
- Position: Midfielder

Team information
- Current team: Alajuelense

Senior career*
Years	Team	Apps	(Gls)
2019–2020	Maccabi Holon	3+	(1+)
- Alajuelense

International career^{‡}
2013–	Panama	10	(4)
- * Club domestic league appearances and goals as of 5 December 2019 ‡ National team caps and goals as of 9 July 2019

Kenia Kristel Rangel Villarreal (born 6 August 1995) is a Panamanian footballer who plays as a midfielder for Costa Rican club Liga Deportiva Alajuelense and the Panama women's national team.

== International career ==
Rangel appeared in five matches for Panama and scored one goal at the 2018 CONCACAF Women's Championship. She scored a hat trick against El Salvador in a 2018 CONCACAF Women's Championship qualification match.

== International goals ==
No.	Date	Venue	Opponent	Score	Result	Competition
1.	29 August 2018	IMG Academy, Bradenton, United States	El Salvador	3–2	6–2	2018 CONCACAF Women's Championship qualification
2.	29 August 2018	IMG Academy, Bradenton, United States	El Salvador	4–2	6–2	2018 CONCACAF Women's Championship qualification
3.	29 August 2018	IMG Academy, Bradenton, United States	El Salvador	6–2	6–2	2018 CONCACAF Women's Championship qualification
4.	4 October 2018	WakeMed Soccer Park, Cary, United States	Trinidad and Tobago	2–0	3–0	2018 CONCACAF Women's Championship
5.	16 February 2024	Estadio Universidad Latina, Penonomé, Panama	Paraguay	1–0	2–0	Friendly

== See also ==
- List of Panama women's international footballers
