= FIFA Futsal Women's World Cup =

International futsal competition

- Organiser(s): FIFA
- Founded: 2025
- Region: International
- Teams: 16 (finals)
- Related competitions: FIFA Futsal World Cup
- Current champions: Brazil (1st title)
- Most championships: Brazil (1 title)
- 2025 FIFA Futsal Women's World Cup

The FIFA Futsal Women's World Cup is an international futsal competition set to be contested by the senior women's national teams of the member associations of FIFA, the sport's global governing body.

== History ==
The FIFA Futsal Women's World Cup was created by the FIFA Council in December 2022.

FIFA had previously announced plans for a women's futsal competition in 2018 and received criticism from futsal players for their "public neglect" of the sport.

For the first edition, 16 teams participated in the tournament. The inaugural edition was played in the Philippines in 2025. Brazil won the first championship.

The second edition is scheduled to take place in 2029.

== Qualification ==
The first tournament consists of 16 teams, with the allocated places listed below:

| Confederation | Championship |
|---|---|
| AFC (Asia) | AFC Women's Futsal Asian Cup |
| CAF (Africa) | Women's Futsal Africa Cup of Nations |
| CONCACAF (North, Central America and Caribbean) | CONCACAF W Futsal Championship |
| CONMEBOL (South America) | Copa América Femenina de Futsal |
| UEFA (Europe) | FIFA Futsal Women's World Cup qualification (UEFA) |
| OFC (Oceania) | OFC Women's Futsal Cup |

== Results ==
Keys

- aet: after extra time
- p: penalty shoot-out

| Ed. | Year | Host | Final | | | Third place game | | | Num. teams |
| Ed. | Year | Host | (gold) Champions | Score | (silver) Runners-up | (bronze) Third place | Score | Fourth place | Num. teams |
|---|---|---|---|---|---|---|---|---|---|
| 1 | 2025 | Philippines | Brazil | 3–0 | Portugal | Spain | 5–1 | Argentina | 16 |
| 2 | 2029 | | | | | | | | 16 |

== Overall team records ==
In this ranking 3 points are awarded for a win, 1 for a draw and 0 for a loss. As per statistical convention in football, matches decided in extra time are counted as wins and losses, while matches decided by penalty shoot-outs are counted as draws. Teams are ranked by total points, then by goal difference, then by goals scored.

As of 2025 FIFA Futsal Women's World Cup

| Rank | Team | Part | Pld | W | D | L | GF | GA | GD | Points |
|---|---|---|---|---|---|---|---|---|---|---|
| 1 | Brazil | 1 | 6 | 6 | 0 | 0 | 32 | 4 | +28 | 18 |
| 2 | Portugal | 1 | 6 | 5 | 0 | 1 | 37 | 7 | +30 | 15 |
| 3 | Spain | 1 | 6 | 5 | 0 | 1 | 29 | 9 | +20 | 15 |
| 4 | Argentina | 1 | 6 | 4 | 0 | 2 | 20 | 16 | +4 | 12 |
| 5 | Italy | 1 | 4 | 2 | 0 | 2 | 23 | 14 | +9 | 6 |
| 6 | Japan | 1 | 4 | 2 | 0 | 2 | 17 | 9 | +8 | 6 |
| 7 | Colombia | 1 | 4 | 2 | 0 | 2 | 8 | 10 | –2 | 6 |
| 8 | Morocco | 1 | 4 | 2 | 0 | 2 | 5 | 14 | –9 | 6 |
| 9 | Poland | 1 | 3 | 1 | 0 | 2 | 8 | 4 | +4 | 3 |
| 10 | Iran | 1 | 3 | 1 | 0 | 2 | 8 | 9 | –1 | 3 |
| 11 | Thailand | 1 | 3 | 1 | 0 | 2 | 9 | 12 | –3 | 3 |
| 12 | Tanzania | 1 | 3 | 1 | 0 | 2 | 4 | 21 | –17 | 3 |
| 13 | Philippines | 1 | 3 | 0 | 0 | 3 | 3 | 14 | –11 | 0 |
| 14 | Canada | 1 | 3 | 0 | 0 | 3 | 3 | 15 | –12 | 0 |
| 15 | New Zealand | 1 | 3 | 0 | 0 | 3 | 2 | 20 | –18 | 0 |
| 16 | Panama | 1 | 3 | 0 | 0 | 3 | 2 | 32 | –30 | 0 |

== Comprehensive team results by tournament ==
Legend

- 1st – Champions
- 2nd – Runners-up
- 3rd – Third place
- 4th – Fourth place
- QF – Quarter-finals
- R1 – Round 1 (group stage)
- • – Did not qualify
- × – Did not enter / Withdrew
- X – Disqualified
- XX – Country did not exist or national team was inactive
- – Hosts
- Q – Qualified for upcoming tournament

For each tournament, the flag of the host country and the number of teams in each finals tournament (in brackets) are shown.

| Team | Confederation | 2025 (Philippines) (16) | 2029 (16) | Total |
|---|---|---|---|---|
| Argentina | CONMEBOL | 4th | | 1 |
| Brazil | CONMEBOL | 1st | | 1 |
| Canada | CONCACAF | R1 | | 1 |
| Colombia | CONMEBOL | QF | | 1 |
| Iran | AFC | R1 | | 1 |
| Italy | UEFA | QF | | 1 |
| Japan | AFC | QF | | 1 |
| Morocco | CAF | QF | | 1 |
| New Zealand | OFC | R1 | | 1 |
| Panama | CONCACAF | R1 | | 1 |
| Philippines | AFC | R1 | | 1 |
| Poland | UEFA | R1 | | 1 |
| Portugal | UEFA | 2nd | | 1 |
| Spain | UEFA | 3rd | | 1 |
| Tanzania | CAF | R1 | | 1 |
| Thailand | AFC | R1 | | 1 |
| Team | Confederation | 2025 (Philippines) (16) | 2029 (16) | Total |

== Awards ==
| Tournament | Golden Ball | Golden Boot | Goals | Golden Glove | FIFA Fair Play Trophy |
|---|---|---|---|---|---|
| Philippines 2025 | (Brazil) Emilly | (Brazil) Emilly | 7 | (Portugal) Ana Catarina | Brazil |

== See also ==
- FIFA Futsal World Cup
- Women's Futsal World Tournament
- World University Futsal Championships
