= Asociación Mundial de Futsal =

Governing body of futsal

World Futsal Association — AMF
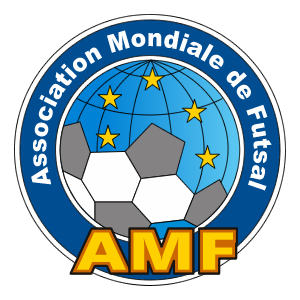
- French version
- Sport: Futsal
- Abbreviation: AMF
- Headquarters: Asunción, Paraguay
- President: Rolando Alarcón Ríos
- Secretary: Wilfrido Coffi
- Replaced: 1 December 2002 as AMF
- (founded): 25 July 1971 as FIFUSA

Official website
- amfutsal.org
- Other key staff: Jaime Arroyave; Kurt Hardvet; Namdev Shirgonkar; Abdel Morkhtar; Antonio Cifuentes

The World Futsal Association (AMF) is a governing body of futsal for both independent and non-independent states or regions, headquartered in Asunción, Paraguay. It was founded on 25 July 1971 as the International Futsal Federation (FIFUSA) in Rio de Janeiro, Brazil. On 1 December 2002, the organisation was replaced and changed its name to the Spanish version Asociación Mundial de Futsal (AMF).

== Names ==
1. FIFUSA: Federação Internacional de Futebol de Salão or Federación Internacional de Fútbol de Salón (International Federation of Indoor Football; 1971–2002)
2. AMF: Asociación Mundial de Futsal (World Futsal Association; 2003–present)

== History ==
See also History of futsal

Futsal started in Montevideo, Uruguay, in 1930, when Juan Carlos Ceriani created a version of indoor football for recreation in YMCAs. In 1965, the South American Futsal Confederation was formed, consisting of Uruguay, Paraguay, Peru, Argentina and Brazil.

The sport began to spread across South America, and its popularity led to the formation of a governing body in 1971 under the name of FIFUSA (Federação Internacional de Futebol de Salão or Federación Internacional de Fútbol de Salón), comprising Argentina, Bolivia, Brazil, Paraguay, Peru, Portugal and Uruguay, and the creation of world championships. The first FIFUSA World Championship was held in São Paulo, with hosts Brazil crowned champions ahead of Paraguay and Uruguay. Even more countries participated in the second World Championship held in Madrid in 1985.

Due to a dispute between FIFA and FIFUSA over the use of the word "football", FIFUSA started using the term futsal in 1985, although FIFA also adopted it four years later. In the 1990s, FIFA wanted to promote and spread its own version of indoor football, different from the original one played in South America, but it could not find an agreement with FIFUSA at the Rio de Janeiro Congress in 1989. In 2000, there was another failed attempt to repair the situation in Guatemala, where FIFA was holding its fourth world championship of futsal. In December 2002, FIFUSA was reorganised into the World Futsal Association (AMF).

AMF's current version of futsal is different from the version developed by FIFA. Notably, AMF's futsal has throw-ins instead of kick-ins, and corner throws instead of corner kicks.

== Organisation ==
Confederation	Continent
Confédération Africaine de Futsal (CAFUSA)	Africa
Confederation of Asian Futsal (CAFS)	Asia
Futsal European Federation (FEF)	Europe
Confederation of North, Central American and Caribbean Futsal (CONCACFUTSAL)	North America, Central America and Caribbean
Oceania Futsal Confederation (OFC)	Oceania
Confederación Panamericana de Futsal (CPFS/PANAFUTSAL)	Americas
Confederación Sudamericana de Futsal (CSFS)	South America

== AMF Futsal World Cup ==
The AMF and its respective confederations organise futsal tournaments around the world. The AMF Futsal World Cup, which was first staged in 1982, is held every four years.

A women's world cup was first staged in 2008. In 2017, Brazil became the first non-host nation team to win the women's tournament.

=== Current title holders ===
Competition	Year	Champions	Title	Runners-up	Next edition
National teams (Men's)
AMF Futsal World Cup	2023	Paraguay	4th	Uruguay	2027
National teams (Women's)
AMF Futsal Women's World Cup	2022	Colombia	1st	Canada	2026

== Results in FIFUSA/AMF competitions ==
=== Men's national teams ===
==== International ====
Competition	Year	Host	Winner	Runner-up	3rd	4th
FIFUSA World; Futsal Championships	1982	Brazil	Brazil	Paraguay	Colombia	Uruguay
FIFUSA World; Futsal Championships	1985	Spain	Brazil	Spain	Paraguay	Argentina
FIFUSA World; Futsal Championships	1988	Australia	Paraguay	Brazil	Spain	Portugal
FIFUSA World; Futsal Championships	1991	Italy	Portugal	Paraguay	Brazil	Bolivia
FIFUSA World; Futsal Championships	1994	Argentina	Argentina	Colombia	Uruguay	Brazil
FIFUSA World; Futsal Championships	1997	Mexico	Venezuela	Uruguay	Brazil	Russia
FIFUSA World; Futsal Championships	2000	Bolivia	Colombia	Bolivia	Argentina	Russia
AMF World; Futsal Championships	2003	Paraguay	Paraguay	Colombia	Bolivia	Peru
AMF World; Futsal Championships	2007	Argentina	Paraguay	Argentina	Colombia	Peru
AMF World; Futsal Championships	2011	Colombia	Colombia	Paraguay	Argentina	Russia
AMF World; Futsal Championships	2015	Belarus	Colombia	Paraguay	Argentina	Belgium
AMF World; Futsal Championships	2019	Argentina	Argentina	Brazil	Paraguay	South Africa
AMF World; Futsal Championships	2023	Mexico	Paraguay	Uruguay	Colombia	Catalonia
World Games	2013	Colombia	Colombia	Venezuela	Brazil	Argentina

==== Continental (major) ====
Continental	Year	Host	Winner	Runner-up	3rd	4th
UEFS European; Futsal Championship	1989	Spain	Portugal	Spain	Czechoslovakia	Israel
UEFS European; Futsal Championship	1990	Portugal	Portugal	Czechoslovakia	Spain	England
UEFS European; Futsal Championship	1992	Portugal	Spain	Russia	Portugal	Israel
UEFS European; Futsal Championship	1995	Morocco	Slovakia	Morocco	Russia	Czech Republic
UEFS European; Futsal Championship	1998	Slovakia	Russia	Spain	Slovakia	Belarus
UEFS European; Futsal Championship	2004	Belarus	Belarus	Czech Republic	Russia	Ukraine
UEFS European; Futsal Championship	2006	Catalonia	Russia	Catalonia	Czech Republic	Belgium
UEFS European; Futsal Championship	2008	Belgium	Russia	Czech Republic	Belarus	Belgium
UEFS European; Futsal Championship	2010	Russia	Russia	Belgium	Czech Republic	Belarus
UEFS European; Futsal Championship	2012	Belarus	Belgium	Czech Republic	Russia	Catalonia
UEFS European; Futsal Championship	2014	Czech Republic	Belarus	Belgium	Catalonia	Russia
UEFS European; Futsal Championship	2016	Russia	Russia	Italy	Czech Republic & Kazakhstan	
UEFS European; Futsal Championship	2018	Catalonia	Belgium	Czech Republic	Russia & Latvia	
South American; Futsal Championship	1965	Paraguay	Paraguay	Uruguay	Brazil	Argentina
South American; Futsal Championship	1969	Paraguay	Brazil	Paraguay	Argentina	Uruguay
South American; Futsal Championship	1971	Brazil	Brazil	Uruguay	Paraguay	Peru
South American; Futsal Championship	1973	Uruguay	Brazil	Uruguay	Paraguay	Argentina
South American; Futsal Championship	1975	Argentina	Brazil	Uruguay	Paraguay	Argentina
South American; Futsal Championship	1976	Uruguay	Brazil	Paraguay	Uruguay	Argentina
South American; Futsal Championship	1977	Brazil	Brazil	Paraguay	Colombia	Uruguay
South American; Futsal Championship	1979	Colombia	Brazil	Uruguay	Argentina	Bolivia
South American; Futsal Championship	1983	Uruguay	Brazil	Paraguay	Uruguay	Argentina
South American; Futsal Championship	1986	Argentina	Brazil	Paraguay	Argentina	Uruguay
South American; Futsal Championship	1989	Brazil	Brazil	Paraguay	Uruguay	Bolivia

=== Women's national teams ===
==== International ====
Continental	Year	Host	Winner	Runner-up	3rd	4th
AMF Futsal Women's World Cup	2008	Catalonia	Catalonia	Galicia	Colombia	Russia
AMF Futsal Women's World Cup	2013	Colombia	Colombia	Venezuela	Czech Republic	Argentina
AMF Futsal Women's World Cup	2017	Catalonia	Brazil	Argentina	Colombia	Paraguay
AMF Futsal Women's World Cup	2022	Colombia	Colombia	Canada	Venezuela	Catalonia

==== Continental ====
Continental	Year	Host	Winner	Runner-up	3rd	4th
Europe (UEFS)	2001	Russia	Russia	Belarus	Italy	
Europe (UEFS)	2004	Russia	Russia	Catalonia	Ukraine	Belgium
Europe (UEFS)	2007	Czech Republic	Czech Republic	Russia	Slovakia	Ukraine
Europe (UEFS)	2009	Poland	Russia	Czech Republic	Catalonia	Poland
Europe (UEFS)	2011	Czech Republic	Czech Republic	Russia	Catalonia	France
Europe (UEFS)	2015	Catalonia	Russia	Czech Republic	Catalonia	Netherlands

== See also ==
- European Union of Futsal (UEFS)
- UEFS Futsal Men's Championship
- UEFS Futsal Women's Championship
- Futsal (futebol de salão, fútbol de salón, microfútbol, football sala, futsalon, calcio a 5 indoor).
- Futsal Association of India
