= UEFS Futsal Women's Championship =

Sporting competition

The UEFS Futsal European Women's Championships or Eurofutsal was the championship for futsal national teams in Europe. It was first held in 2001 and played every 3 years until 2007, and every 2 years since then. The tournament was organized by the European Union of Futsal.

== Summaries ==
Year	Host	Final			Third place
Year	Host	Winner	Score	Runner-up	Third place	Score	Fourth place
2001; Details	Russia	Russia	league	Belarus	Ukraine	league	Italy
2004; Details	Russia	Russia	2–0	Catalonia	Ukraine		Belgium
2007; Details	Czech Republic	Czech Republic	league	Russia	Slovakia	league	Ukraine
2009; Details	Poland	Russia	DSQ	(Galicia (Spain)); Galicia	Czech Republic	1–0	Catalonia
2011; Details	Czech Republic	Czech Republic	league	Russia	Catalonia	league	France
2015; Details	Catalonia	Russia	league	Czech Republic	Catalonia	league	Netherlands
2017; Details	Catalonia	Russia	league	Belgium	Norway	league	Catalonia

== Performance by members ==
=== Medal count ===
Rank	Nation	Gold	Silver	Bronze	Total
1	Russia	5	2	0	7
2	Czech Republic	2	2	0	4
3	Catalonia	0	1	3	4
4	Belarus	0	1	0	1
4	Belgium	0	1	0	1
6	Ukraine	0	0	2	2
7	Norway	0	0	1	1
7	Slovakia	0	0	1	1
Totals (8 entries)		7	7	7	21

=== Participation details ===
Team	2001 (Russia) (4)	2004 (Russia) (6)	2007 (Czech Republic) (5)	2009 (Poland) (7)	2011 (Czech Republic) (5)	2015 (Catalonia) (5)	2017 (Catalonia) (4)	Years
Armenia	×	6th	×	×	×	×	×	1
Belarus	2nd	5th	×	×	×	×	×	2
Belgium	×	4th	×	••	×	×	2nd	2
Bulgaria	×	×	×	5th	×	×	×	1
Catalonia	×	2nd	×	3rd	3rd	3rd	4th	5
Czech Republic	×	×	1st	2nd	1st	2nd	×	4
France	×	×	×	×	4th	×	×	1
Galicia	×	×	×	DSQ	×	×	×	1
Italy	4th	×	×	6th	5th	5th	×	4
Lithuania	×	×	5th	×	×	×	×	1
Netherlands	×	×	×	×	×	4th	×	1
Norway	×	×	×	×	×	×	3rd	1
Poland	×	×	×	4th	×	×	×	1
Russia	1st	1st	2nd	1st	2nd	1st	1st	7
Slovakia	×	×	3rd	×	×	×	×	1
Ukraine	3rd	3rd	4th	×	×	×	×	3

Legend

- 1st – Champions
- 2nd – Runners-up
- 3rd – Third place
- 4th – Fourth place
- 5th-6th — Fifth to Sixth place
- Q — Qualified for upcoming tournament
- •• — Qualified but withdrew
- • — Did not qualify
- × — Did not enter / Withdrew from the European Championship / Banned
- DSQ — Disqualified
- — Hosts
