= Catalonia women's national futsal team =

Catalonia
- Nickname(s): La selecció
- Association: Federació Catalana de Futbol Sala
- Confederation: UEFS (Europe)
- Head coach: Toni Marchal
Home colours	Away colours

AMF World Cup
- Appearances: 3 (First in 2008)
- Best result: Champions, (2008)

Europe UEFS Championship
- Appearances: 4 (First in 2004)
- Best result: Runners-up, (2004)

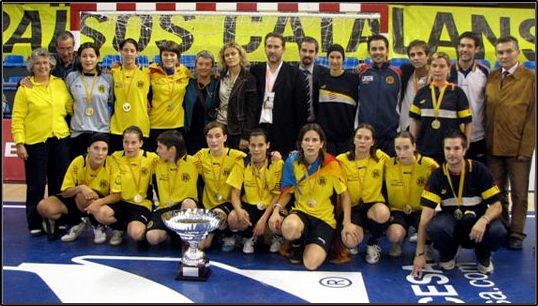
2008 World Cup Champions

The Catalonia women's national futsal team represents Catalonia in international futsal competitions organized by AMF and UEFS. It is controlled by the Catalonia Futsal Federation. They won the 2008 AMF Futsal Women's World Cup.

== Tournament records ==
=== AMF World Cup record ===
Year	Position	GP	W	D	L	GS	GA
Catalonia 2008	Winners	5	4	0	1	15	6
Colombia 2013	Quarter-finals	4	2	0	2	8	6
Catalonia 2017	5th place	5	2	1	2	7	11
Total	3/3	14	8	1	5	30	23

=== UEFS European Championship record ===
Year	Position	GP	W	D	L	GS	GA
Russia 2001	Did not participate						
Russia 2004	Runners-up	4	3	0	1	13	5
Czech Republic 2007	Did not participate						
Poland 2009	3rd place	4	1	0	3	15	8
Czech Republic 2011	3rd place	4	2	1	1	13	7
Catalonia 2015	3rd place	4	2	0	2	32	15
Total	4/6	16	8	1	7	73	35

== Current squad ==
2011 UEFS Championship
#	Name
1	Leticia Illa
2	Carolina Jiménez
3	Núria Alcalde
4	Deidre Céspedes
5	Cristina Seguer
6	Sonia Àlvarez
7	Cristina Moreno
8	Carolina Juliench
9	Alejandra Mateu
10	Judit Peran
11	Cristina Gómez
12	Ester Gómez
13	Mònica Bernabé
14	Anna Munné
National coach: Toni Marchal

2009 UEFS Championship
#	Position	Name	Club
1		Marta Vilaró Pacheco
2		Mariona Casas Roldán
3		Alicia Gudiño Rodríguez
4		Laia Vidal Barceló
5		Carolina Oliva Albors
6		Neus Rosiñol Menchón
7		Mònica Masero Cunill
8		Maria Xandri Casas
9		María Jiménez Díaz
10		Anna Fígols Serralvo
11		Cristina Capdevila Grau
13		Patrícia Gimeno Ferrara
14		Mireia Randúa i Virgili
16		Fernanda Strey Piantá
Coach : Toni Marchal; 2nd Coach: Nicolàs Fernández

== See also ==
- Catalonia men's national futsal team
- Futsal in Catalonia
