= Futsal Association of India =

National Futsal Association

- Sport: Futsal
- Abbreviation: FAI
- Founded: 2007; 19 years ago
- Affiliation: Asociación Mundial de Futsal
- Headquarters: Mumbai
- President: Namdev Shirgaonkar

Futsal Association of India (FAI) is the governing body of state-level futsal and Asian Premier Futsal Championship in India. FAI has been developing futsal through various district and state championships. FAI organised its 1st Youth Futsal Championship in 2011. It is affiliated with the Asociación Mundial de Fútbol de Salón (AMF) since 2011, and was a founding member of the Confederation of Asian Futsal (CAFS).

== See also ==
- India national futsal team
- Football in India
- AMF Futsal World Cup
- AFC Futsal Asian Cup
- AFC Futsal Club Championship
- FIFA Futsal World Cup
- Futsal Club Championship
- Minifootball
- Five-a-side football
- Indoor soccer
