= Confederation of North, Central American and the Caribbean Futsal =

International governing body for futsal

CONCACFUTSAL
- Formation: 2000; 26 years ago
- Headquarters: Curaçao
- President: Wilfrido Coffi
- Vice president: Carlos Briceño
- Vice President: Manuel Enrique Sanchez
- Secretary: Arthur Tjin-Kon-Fat

The Confederation of North, Central American and the Caribbean Futsal (CONCACFUTSAL) is the governing body of futsal for countries and regions under the Asociación Mundial de Futsal (AMF).

== History ==
CONCACFUTSAL was founded on October 13, 2000, with professor Lorenzo Garcia of Mexico named its first president. Garcia served until 2006 when his vice president Wildrido Coffi was elected as leader. Coffi was re-elected at the III. Congress of CONCACFUTSAL in October 2011.

Suriname was named host of the 2015 AMF Futsal Men's World Cup qualifying played from October 11–19, 2014. Competing teams included Canada, Costa Rica, Curaçao, Mexico, Saint Martin and the United States. Curaçao won the right to represent the federation in Belarus.

== Members ==
CONCACFUTSAL member associations
Country	Association	CONCACFUTSAL affiliation
Aruba	Futsal Aruba	2000
Bonaire	Futsal Bonaire	
Canada	Canadian Futsalon Federation	2011
Colombia	Federación Colombiana de Fútbol de Salón	2000
Costa Rica	Asociacion de Futbol Salon Costa Rica	2000
Curaçao	Curaçao Futsal Federation	2000
El Salvador	Association Salvadorena de Futsal	2013
Mexico	Federación Mexicana de Futsal	2000
Puerto Rico	Futsal Puerto Rico	2006
Sint Maarten	SXM Futsal	2006
Suriname	Surinaamse ZaalVoetBalBond	2012
United States	AMF USA	2018
Venezuela	Federacion Venezolana de Futbol de Salon	

== CONCACFUTSAL at AMF World Cup ==
CONCACFUTSAL nations have won the AMF Men's World Cup on four occasions. Before the CONCACFUTSAL formation, Venezuela captured the world title in 1997. Colombia (2000, 2011, 2015) is the current cup holder. Colombia hosted the second edition of the AMF Women's World Cup in 2013, defeating Venezuela in the Final by 3–2.
