= Chinese Taipei women's national futsal team =

Chinese Taipei
- Nickname(s): Mulan
- Association: Chinese Taipei Football Association (CTFA)
- Confederation: AFC (Asia)
- FIFA code: TPE
- FIFA ranking: 16 ▲2 (12 December 2025)

First international
- Paraguay 3–2 Chinese Taipei (Barrancabermeja, Colombia; 8 Nov 2013)

Biggest win
- Chinese Taipei 18–0 Macau (Yangon, Myanmar; 15 January 2025)

Biggest defeat
- Brazil 16–0 Chinese Taipei (Balaguer, Catalonia; 20 Nov 2017)

FIFA World Cup
- Appearances: 0

AMF World Cup
- Appearances: 2 (First in 2013)
- Best result: Quarterfinals, (2013)

AFC Women's Futsal Championship/AFC Women's Futsal Asian Cup
- Appearances: 3 (First in 2018)
- Best result: Quarterfinals, (2018) (2025)

Asian Indoor and Martial Arts Games
- Appearances: 0

The Chinese Taipei women's national futsal team (Chinese: 中華台北女子五人制足球代表隊; pinyin: Zhōnghuá Táiběi nuzǐ wurendzi zúqiú dàibiǎo duì) is the official name given by FIFA to the women's national futsal team of Taiwan.

== Competitive record ==
*Draws include knockout matches decided on penalty kicks.
**Gold background colour indicates that the tournament was won.
***Red border colour indicates tournament was held on home soil.

=== FIFA Futsal Women's World Cup ===
FIFA Futsal Women's World Cup record
Year	Result	Pos.	Pld	W	D	L	GF	GA	GD
(Philippines) 2025	Did not qualify								
Total	–	0/1	0	0	0	0	0	0	0

=== AMF World Cup ===
Year	Round	Pld	W	D*	L	GF	GA	GD
(Catalonia) 2008	Did not enter							
(Colombia) 2013	Quarterfinals	4	2	0	2	10	13	–3
(Catalonia) 2017	11th place	4	1	1	2	13	24	–11
Total	2/3	8	3	1	4	23	37	–14

=== Futsal at the Asian Indoor and Martial Arts Games ===
Futsal at the Asian Indoor and Martial Arts Games record
Hosts / Year	Result	GP	W	D*	L	GS	GA	GD
(Thailand) 2005	Did not enter							
(Macau) 2007	Did not enter							
(Vietnam) 2009	Did not enter							
(South Korea) 2013	Did not enter							
(Turkmenistan) 2017	Did not enter							
Total	0/5	—	—	—	—	—	—	—

=== AFC Women's Futsal Championship/AFC Women's Futsal Asian Cup ===
AFC Women's Futsal Asian Cup record
Hosts / Year	Result	GP	W	D*	L	GS	GA	GD
(Malaysia) 2015	Did not enter							
(Thailand) 2018	Quarter-finals	4	2	0	2	11	10	+1
(Kuwait) 2020	Cancelled							
(China) 2025	Quarter-finals	4	2	0	2	11	9	+2
Total	2/3	8	4	0	4	22	19	+3

== Kits ==
=== Kit colours ===
Taiwan's traditional colors are blue and white:

Home kit	Away kit	Goalkeeper kit	Goalkeeper kit 2

== Squad ==
=== 2014~2016 ===
No.	Pos.	Player	Date of birth (age)	Caps	Club
1	GK	Chu Fang-yi (朱芳儀)		1	(Chinese Taipei) NTNU
2		Wang Chia-yu (王佳玉)		3	(Chinese Taipei) Taipei-SCSC
3		Chiang Pei-ling (江佩凌)		5	(Chinese Taipei) Taipei-SCSC
4		Hsieh Pei-fen (謝佩芬)		5	(Chinese Taipei) Taipei-SCSC
5		Chang Su-hsin (張愫心)		1	(Chinese Taipei) NTNU
6		Chen Ya-chun (陳雅君)		5	(Chinese Taipei) Taipei-SCSC
7		Teng Wen-fang (鄧雯方)		1	(Chinese Taipei) NTNU
8		Hsu Chen-chen (許宸甄)		1	(Chinese Taipei) HUALIEN Tai-Kai
9		Chen Yi-ping (陳怡萍)		1	(Chinese Taipei) NTNU
10		Chung Yi-hsuan (鍾怡璇)		5	(Chinese Taipei) Taipei-SCSC
11		Chang Shu-chin (張淑晶)		5	(Chinese Taipei) NTNU
12	GK	Wu Yu-hsuan (吳於璇)		1	unattached
13		Ting Chi (丁旗)	2 June 1995 (age 30)	5	(Chinese Taipei) NTNU
14	GK	Zhuang Yun-pei (莊昀珮)		4	(Chinese Taipei) PINTUNG University

=== 2017 ~ ===
The following players are called up for the 2018 AFC Championship preparation camp.

No.	Pos.	Player	Date of birth (age)	Caps	Club
1	GK	Zhuang Yun-pei (莊昀珮)		4	
2	GK	程思瑜		0	
3	GK	邱鈺婷		0	
4		Hsieh Pei-fen (謝佩芬)		5	
5		楊雅涵		0	
6		Chen Ya-chun (陳雅君)		5	
7		謝亞琪		0	
8		陳惠玟		0	
9		游菀靖		0	
10		Chung Yi-hsuan (鍾怡璇)		5	
11		陳品卉		0	
12		Wang Chia-yu (王佳玉)		3	
13		陽思惟		0	
14		李岱瑾		0	
15		湯詠晴		0	
16		伍昱茹		0	
17		蘇育萱		0	
18		黃玉慈		0	
19		曾筠晴		0	
20		楊美娟		0	
21		郭祖兒		0	
22		蔡季芸		0	

=== Managers ===
Years	Manager
2014-2016	(Turkey) Mehmet Fatih Kale
2017	(Taiwan) Chang Yao-Ming 張耀明
2025	(Taiwan) Hsieh Li-Chuan (謝麗娟)

== See also ==
- Chinese Taipei national futsal team
- Chinese Taipei women's national football team
