= Mehmet Fatih Kale =

Turkish Football and Futsal coach (born 1968)

Personal information
- Full name: Mehmet Fatih Kale
- Date of birth: 30 May 1968 (age 58)
- Place of birth: Ankara, Turkey
- Height: 1.64 m (5 ft 4 1/2 in)

Managerial career
- Years: Team
- 2000–2016: Taipei-SCSC Club
- 2006: Taipei Select men's futsal team
- 2014–2016: Chinese Taipei women's national futsal team
- 2016: Brunei national futsal team
- 2017: Chinese Taipei (technical director)
- 2018: Laos U23
- 2021–2022: Gençlerbirliği FK Women's (sporting director)
- 2023–: Bhutan (technical director)
- 2025: Paro FC (assistant)

Mehmet Fatih Kale (born 30 May 1968) is a Turkish football and futsal coach/manager. In 2014, Kale established the first women's futsal national team for the Chinese Taipei Football Association. Kale was granted Republic of China (Taiwan) citizenship in January 2018 due to his long time contributions to the sports in the country.

== Managerial statistic ==
	Team	From	To	Record				
	Team	From	To	G	W	D	L	Win %
(Chinese Taipei)	Taipei Select men's futsal team	2006	2006	3	2	0	1	66.67
(Taiwan)	Taipei-SCSC Club	2007	2016	154	117	16	21	75.97
(Chinese Taipei)	Chinese Taipei women's national futsal team	2014	2016	5	3	0	2	60.00
(Brunei)	Brunei national futsal team	2016	2016	7	7	0	0	100.00
(Chinese Taipei)	Chinese Taipei men's national futsal team	2017	2017	9	4	1	4	44.44
(Laos)	Laos U23	2018	2018	8	5	0	3	62.50
Career total				186	138	17	31	74.19

== Honors ==
- 2009 Chinese Taipei Football Association "Coach of The Year" award
