= AMF Futsal World Cup =

Futsal tournament of national teams

- Organiser(s): AMF
- Founded: Men: 1982; Women: 2008
- Region: International
- Teams: Men: 16; Women: 12
- Current champions: Men: Paraguay (4th title); Women: Colombia (2nd title)
- Most championships: Men: Paraguay (4 titles); Women: Colombia (2 titles)
- Website: Official website

The AMF Futsal World Championships (previously called the FIFUSA Futsal World Championships) is the international championships for futsal, the indoor version of football organized by FIFUSA (1971–2002) and AMF (2003–present).

The world championship tournament was held every three years until 2003, and is now played every four years. The first event was held in 1982 in Brazil. The South American teams have won the majority of the championships, with Paraguay as the most successful team winning 4 titles. Portugal is the sole team beyond South America to have won a championship, winning the 1991 edition.

Since 2008, a women's tournament is also held. As of 2017, only three tournaments have been played: the 2008 edition in Spain, the 2013 edition in Colombia and the 2017 edition held once again in Spain.

== Results ==
=== Men's World Cup FIFUSA-AMF ===
Year	Host	Winner	Score	Runner-up	Third place	Score	Fourth place	Number of teams
1982; Details	Brazil	Brazil	1–0	Paraguay	Uruguay	0–0 (aet) (2–1 p)	Colombia	10
1985; Details	Spain	Brazil	3–1	Spain	Paraguay	10–3	Argentina	12
1988; Details	Australia	Paraguay	2–1	Brazil	Spain	3–2	Portugal	16
1991; Details	Italy	Portugal	1–1 (aet) (3–2 p)	Paraguay	Brazil	5–1	Bolivia	22
1994; Details	Argentina	Argentina	2–1 (aet)	Colombia	Uruguay	1–0	Brazil	22
1997; Details	Mexico	Venezuela	4–0	Uruguay	Brazil	4-1	Russia	20
2000; Details	Bolivia	Colombia	3–3 (aet) (3–1 p)	Bolivia	Argentina	6–6 (aet) (6–5 p)	Russia	16
2003; Details	Paraguay	Paraguay	Group Stage	Colombia	Bolivia	Group Stage	Peru	20
2007; Details	Argentina	Paraguay	1–0	Argentina	Colombia	6–4	Peru	16
2011; Details	Colombia	Colombia	8–2	Paraguay	Argentina	8–4	Russia	16
2015; Details	Belarus	Colombia	4–0	Paraguay	Argentina	7–1	Belgium	16
2019; Details	Argentina	Argentina	3–2	Brazil	Paraguay	11–1	South Africa	15
2023; Details	Mexico	Paraguay	6–1	Uruguay	Colombia	2–0	Catalonia	14

=== Women's World Cup AMF ===
Year	Host	Winner	Score	Runner-up	Third place	Score	Fourth place	Number of teams
2008; Details	Catalonia	Catalonia	4–0	Galicia	Colombia	6–4	Russia	12
2013; Details	Colombia	Colombia	3–2	Venezuela	Czech Republic	4–3	Argentina	16
2017; Details	Catalonia	Brazil	4–2	Argentina	Colombia	3–0	Paraguay	12
2022; Details	Colombia	Colombia	12–0	Canada	Venezuela	3–0	Catalonia	12
2026; Details								

=== Men's World Cup (FIFUSA) ===
Year	Host	Winner	Score	Runner-up	Third place	Score	Fourth place	Number of teams
2024; Details	Colombia	Colombia	2-1	Brazil	Venezuela	2-0	Argentina	17

=== Women's World Cup (FIFUSA) ===
Year	Host	Winner	Score	Runner-up	Third place	Score	Fourth place	Number of teams
2023; Details	Argentina	Brazil	2-1	Argentina	Colombia	4-3	Australia	10

== Ranking ==
* = hosts

=== Men's World Cup FIFUSA-AMF ===
Team	Titles	Runners-up	Third place	Fourth place	Top 4 finishes
Paraguay	4 (1988, 2003*, 2007, 2023)	4 (1982, 1991, 2011, 2015)	2 (1985, 2019)	0	9
Colombia	3 (2000, 2011*, 2015)	2 (1994, 2003)	2 (2007, 2023)	1 (1982)	7
Brazil	2 (1982*, 1985)	2 (1988, 2019)	2 (1991, 1997)	1 (1994)	7
Argentina	2 (1994*, 2019*)	1 (2007*)	3 (2000, 2011, 2015)	1 (1985)	7
Portugal	1 (1991)	0	0	1 (1988)	2
Venezuela	1 (1997)	0	0	0	1
Uruguay	0	2 (1997, 2023)	2 (1982, 1994)	0	3
Bolivia	0	1 (2000*)	1 (2003)	1 (1991)	3
Spain	0	1 (1985*)	1 (1988)	0	2
Russia	0	0	0	3 (1997, 2000, 2011)	3
Peru	0	0	0	2 (2003, 2007)	2
Belgium	0	0	0	1 (2015)	1
South Africa	0	0	0	1 (2019)	1
Catalonia	0	0	0	1 (2023)	1

=== Women's World Cup AMF ===
Team	Titles	Runners-up	Third place	Fourth place	Top 4 finishes
Colombia	2 (2013*, 2022*)	0	2 (2008, 2017)	0	4
Catalonia	1 (2008*)	0	0	1 (2022)	2
Brazil	1 (2017)	0	0	0	1
Venezuela	0	1 (2013)	1 (2022)	0	2
Argentina	0	1 (2017)	0	1 (2013)	2
Galicia	0	1 (2008)	0	0	1
Canada	0	1 (2022)	0	0	1
Czech Republic	0	0	1 (2013)	0	1
Russia	0	0	0	1 (2008)	1
Paraguay	0	0	0	1 (2017)	1

=== Men's World Cup New FIFUSA ===
Team	Titles	Runners-up	Third place	Fourth place	Top 4 finishes
Colombia	1 (2024*)	0	0	0	1
Brazil	0	1 (2024)	0	0	1
Venezuela	0	0	1 (2024)	0	1
Argentina	0	0	0	1 (2024)	1

=== Women's World Cup New FIFUSA ===
Team	Titles	Runners-up	Third place	Fourth place	Top 4 finishes
Brazil	1 (2023)	1	0	0	1
Argentina	0	1 (2023*)	0	0	1
Colombia	0	0	1 (2023)	0	1
Australia	0	0	0	1 (2023)	1

== Comprehensive team results by tournament ==
=== Men's tournament ===
Legend

- 1st — Champions
- 2nd — Runners-up
- 3rd — Third place
- 4th — Fourth place
- QF — Quarterfinals
- R2 — Round 2
- R1 — Round 1
- Q — Qualified for upcoming tournament
- × – Did not enter
- •• — Qualified but withdrew
- XX — Country did not exist or national team was inactive
- — Hosts

=== General table ===
Nation	1982 (Brazil)	1985 (Spain)	1988 (Australia)	1991 (Italy)	1994 (Argentina)	1997 (Mexico)	2000 (Bolivia)	2003 (Paraguay)	2007 (Argentina)	2011 (Colombia)	2015 (Belarus)	2019 (Argentina)	2023 (Mexico)	Years
Angola	×	×	×	×	×	R1	×	×	×	×	×	×	×	1
Argentina	R1	4th	R2	QF	1st	QF	3rd	R2	2nd	3rd	3rd	1st	×	12
Armenia					●●	×	×	×	×	×	×	×	×	1
Australia	×	R2	R2	R1	×	×	R1	R1	×	×	R1	R1	R1	8
Belarus					R2	QF	R1	×	×	QF	QF	×	×	6
Belgium	×	×	×	×	×	R1	R1	R1	QF	●●	4th	×	×	5
Bolivia	×	×	×	4th	QF	R1	2nd	3rd	QF	×	×	R1	R1	8
Brazil	1st	1st	2nd	3rd	4th	3rd	QF	R2	×	R1	R1	2nd	QF	12
Canada	×	R1	R1	R1	R2	×	×	R1	R1	R1	×	×	R1	8
Catalonia	×	×	×	×	×	×	×	×	R1	R1	●●	QF	4th	4
Chile	×	×	×	×	●●	×	×	×	R1	×	×	×	R1	2
Colombia	4th	×	×	R2	2nd	QF	1st	2nd	3rd	1st	1st	QF	3rd	11
Costa Rica	R1	R1	R1	●●	R2	QF	R1	×	×	×	×	×	×	6
Curaçao											R1	R1	×	2
Czech Republic/ Czechoslovakia	R1	R2	R2	QF	R2	R1	×	R1	QF	R1	QF	×	×	10
DR Congo	×	×	×	×	×	×	×	R1	×	×	×	×	×	1
Ecuador	×	×	×	×	×	×	×	R1	QF	R1	×	×	×	3
England	×	×	R1	R1	×	x	×	×	×	×	×	×	×	2
France	×	×	×	R1	×	×	×	×	×	×	×	QF	R1	3
Hungary	×	×	R1	R1	×	×	×	×	×	×	×	×	×	2
India													●●	0
Republic of Ireland	×	×	×	x	x	x	×	×	×	×	×	×	×	
Israel	×	×	×	R1	R1	R1	×	×	×	×	×	×	×	3
Italy	R1	×	R1	R1	R1	×	×	R1	×	×	×	R1	×	6
Japan	R1	R1	R1	R1	×	R1	×	×	×	×	×	×	×	5
Kyrgyzstan					×	×	×	×	×	×	R1	×	×	1
Mexico	×	×	×	R2	R2	R1	R2	×	×	R1	×	×	QF	6
Moldova					R1	×	×	×	×	×	×	×	×	1
Morocco	×	×	×	×	R1	R1	R1	×	×	×	R1	QF	SF	6
Nepal	×	×	×	×	×	×	×	×	×	×	×	R1	×	1
Netherlands	R1	R1	x	×	×	×	×	×	×	×	×	×	×	3
Netherlands Antilles	×	×	×	×	×	x	R1	×	×	×				1
New Zealand	×	×	R1	●●	×	×	×	×	×	R1	×	×	×	2
Norway	×	×	×	×	×	×	×	×	R1	×	R1	×	×	2
Pakistan	×	×	×	×	×	×	×	×	×	×	×	●●	×	0
Paraguay	2nd	3rd	1st	2nd	QF	×	QF	1st	1st	2nd	2nd	3rd	1st	12
Peru	×	×	×	×	×	×	×	4th	4th	QF	×	×	R1	4
Portugal	×	R2	4th	1st	R2	R2	×	×	×	×	×	×	×	5
Puerto Rico	×	×	×	R1	R1	×	×	×	×	×	×	×	×	2
Russia/ Soviet Union	×	×	×	R1	R2	4th	4th	R2	R1	4th	QF	●●	×	8
Slovakia					R2	R1	R2	×	×	×	R1	×	×	4
South Africa	×	×	×	×	×	×	×	×	×	×	×	4th	×	1
South Ossetia										R1	×	×	×	1
Spain	×	2nd	3rd	QF	QF	R2	QF	R2	×	×	×	×	×	7
Ukraine					×	×	×	R1	×	×	×	×	×	1
United States	×	×	R1	R1	R1	R1	×	×	×	×	×	R1	QF	6
Uruguay	3rd	R2	R2	R2	3rd	2nd	R2	×	R1	R1	QF	R1	2nd	12
Venezuela	×	×	×	QF	QF	1st	×	×	R1	QF	R1	×	●●	6
Nations	10	12	16	24	24	20	16	20	16	16	16	16	16	

=== Women's tournament ===
Legend

- 1st — Champions
- 2nd — Runners-up
- 3rd — Third place
- 4th — Fourth place
- QF — Quarterfinals
- R1 — Round 1
- Q — Qualified for upcoming tournament
- × – Did not enter
- •• — Qualified but withdrew
- — Hosts

Team	(Catalonia) 2008	(Colombia) 2013	(Catalonia) 2017	(Colombia) 2022	Years
Argentina	QF	4th	2nd	×	3
Australia	QF	QF	R1	R1	4
Belgium	R1	×	×	×	1
Bolivia	×	×	×	R1	1
Brazil	×	R1	1st	×	2
Canada	×	R1	×	2nd	2
Catalonia	1st	QF	QF	4th	4
Chile	×	×	×	QF	1
Chinese Taipei	×	QF	R1	×	2
Colombia	3rd	1st	3rd	1st	4
Czech Republic	R1	3rd	●●	×	2
Ecuador	×	×	×	QF	1
El Salvador	×	R1	×	×	1
France	×	●●	R1	R1	2
Galicia	2nd	×	×	×	1
Italy	R1	R1	QF	×	3
Morocco	×	R1	●●	×	1
Paraguay	QF	QF	4th	QF	4
Peru	×	×	×	R1	1
Russia	4th	R1	●●	×	2
South Africa	×	×	R1	×	1
Switzerland	×	×	QF	×	1
Ukraine	R1	×	×	×	1
United States	×	R1	QF	●●	2
Uruguay	×	R1	×	QF	2
Venezuela	QF	2nd	●●	3rd	3
Nations	12	16	12	12	
