= Switzerland women's national futsal team =

Switzerland
- Association: Swiss Football Association
- Confederation: UEFA (Europe)
- Head coach: Fabio Santona
- Top scorer: Malin Gut (1)
- FIFA code: SUI
- FIFA ranking: NR (24 September 2026)
Home colours	Away colours

First international
- France 11–1 Switzerland (Clairefontaine, France; 3 October 2026)

Biggest defeat
- France 11–1 Switzerland (Clairefontaine, France; 3 October 2026)

The Switzerland women's national futsal team (German: Schweizerische Futsal-Frauennationalmannschaft, French: Équipe de Suisse féminine de futsal, Italian: Nazionale femminile di futsal della Svizzera) represents Switzerland in women's international futsal. The national team is controlled by the Swiss Football Association.

== History ==
=== Background ===
The development of women's futsal in Switzerland began more than a decade before the establishment of the national team, with the independent Futsal Masters initiative providing women's teams with opportunities to play futsal during the winter months. The initiative contributed to the growth of women's participation and interest in the sport.

In 2020–21, the Swiss Football Association took over the Futsal Masters format and established the first official women's futsal championship. The women's competition was subsequently restructured for the 2025–26 season with the introduction of two national leagues, providing a more established structure for the development of the sport. In March 2026, the ASF/SFV announced the creation of a women's national futsal team as the next step in the development of women's futsal in Switzerland. A month later, Fabio Santona appointed as the first head coach of the team.

In September 2026, it was announced that the team would play its inaugural match against France on 3 October 2026, following its first training sessions held in Bern in June. On 3 October 2026, the team made its international debut losing 1–11 to the hosts, with Malin Gut scoring the first-ever goal for the team.

== Players ==
=== Current squad ===
The following 18 players were named for the friendly match against France on 3 October 2026.

No.	Pos.	Player	Date of birth (age)	Club
1	GK	Joëlle Zellweger	8 July 1995 (age 31)	(Swiss Football Association) Futsal Minerva
12	GK	Céline Küttel	3 February 1989 (age 37)	Unknown
—	GK	Vanessa Berisha	30 March 2005 (age 21)	(Swiss Football Association) Futsal Club Luzern
3	FP	Lisa Bregenzer	Unknown	(Swiss Football Association) Futsal Club Luzern
4	FP	Leslie Ramseyer	5 June 1997 (age 29)	(Swiss Football Association) Jester Baden
6	FP	Carolyn Mallaun	30 March 1992 (age 34)	(Swiss Football Association) Futsal Club Luzern
7	FP	Nathalie Schenk	2 December 1994 (age 31)	(Swiss Football Association) Futsal Club Luzern
8	FP	Aline Guillet (Captain)	6 March 1999 (age 27)	(Swiss Football Association) Futsal Minerva
9	FP	Valérie Bregy	10 May 2000 (age 26)	(Swiss Football Association) Futsal Sion
10	FP	Malin Gut	1 August 2000 (age 26)	(Swiss Football Association) Jester Baden
11	FP	Jasmine Imboden	9 May 1990 (age 36)	(Swiss Football Association) Futsal Club Luzern
13	FP	Cinzia Zehnder	4 August 1997 (age 29)	(Swiss Football Association) Jester Baden
16	FP	Celina Tenini	16 November 1996 (age 29)	(Swiss Football Association) Jester Baden
18	FP	Natalija Lovrinović	7 October 1991 (age 34)	(Swiss Football Association) Futsal Club Luzern
20	FP	Lea Hinnen	5 July 1993 (age 33)	(Swiss Football Association) Olympique Basel
—	FP	Cinzia Di Pasquale	17 September 1998 (age 28)	(Swiss Football Association) Futsal Minerva
—	FP	Anja Thürig	3 May 1995 (age 31)	(Swiss Football Association) FC Blue Stars Zürich
—	FP	Cécile Piller	Unknown	(Swiss Football Association) Uni Futsal Bulle
—	FP	Tanisha Williams	20 June 2000 (age 26)	(Swiss Football Association) Jester Baden

== Competitive record ==
=== FIFA Futsal Women's World Cup ===
FIFA Futsal Women's World Cup record								Qualification record					
Year	Position	Pld	W	D*	L	GF	GA	Pld	W	D*	L	GF	GA
(Philippines) 2025	Did not exist							Did not exist					
Total	0/1	—	—	—	—	—	—	—	—	—	—	—	—

*Draws include knockout matches decided on penalty kicks.

=== UEFA Women's Futsal Championship ===
UEFA Women's Futsal Championship record								Qualifying record					
Year	Position	Pld	W	D*	L	GF	GA	Pld	W	D*	L	GF	GA
(Portugal) 2019	Did not exist							Did not exist					
(Portugal) 2022	Did not exist							Did not exist					
(Hungary) 2023	Did not exist							Did not exist					
(Croatia) 2027	Did not exist							Did not exist					
Total	0/4	—	—	—	—	—	—	—	—	—	—	—	—

*Draws include knockout matches decided on penalty kicks.

== Head-to-head record ==
As of 3 October 2026
Key

Positive balance (more wins than losses)
Neutral balance (as many wins as losses)
Negative balance (more losses than wins)

The following table shows the Switzerland' all-time official international record per opponent:

Opponent	Pld	W	D	L	GF	GA	GD	W%
France	1	0	0	1	1	11	−10	00.00
Total	1	0	0	1	1	11	−10	00.00

== AMF-affiliated team ==
Prior to the establishment of the FIFA-affiliated team in 2026, a Swiss national side participated in the 2017 AMF Futsal Women's World Cup. The team failed to win any of its five matches, with its only point coming from a draw against Chinese Taipei, and finished eighth out of the 12 participating teams.

== See also ==
- Switzerland women's national beach soccer team
