= 2017 AMF Futsal Women's World Cup =

2017 III AMF Futsal Women's World Cup
Mundial AMF Futsal Femenino 2017

Tournament details
- Host country: Catalonia, Spain
- Dates: 19–25 November 2017
- Teams: 12 (from 6 confederations)
- Venue: 1 (in 1 host city)

Final positions
- Champions: Brazil (1st title)
- Runners-up: Argentina
- Third place: Colombia
- Fourth place: Paraguay

Tournament statistics
- Matches played: 28
- Goals scored: 223 (7.96 per match)

The 2017 AMF Futsal Women's World Cup, also known as the Mundial AMF Futsal Femenino 2017, was the third edition of the AMF Futsal Women's World Cup. The tournament was held in Balaguer, Catalonia from 19 to 25 November 2017. Twelve national teams from all confederations participated in the tournament including: Argentina, Australia, Brazil, Catalonia, Chinese Taipei, Colombia, France, Italy, Paraguay, South Africa, Switzerland and the United States.

== Participating teams ==
In addition to host nation Catalonia, 12 nations participated.

Tournament	Date	Venue	Qualified teams	
Host	2 June 2016	—	1	Catalonia
2013 AMF Futsal Women's World Cup	7 – 16 November 2013	Colombia	1	Colombia
2015 AMF South American Women's Futsal Championship	10 – 14 June 2015	Colombia	1	~~Venezuela~~; Paraguay
2015 UEFS Futsal Women's Championships	14 – 18 December 2015	Catalonia	0	~~Russia~~; ~~Czech Republic~~
North America selected team	3 December 2016	—	1	United States
Wild Card	7 December 2016	—	1	France^{1}
Africa selected team	21 December 2016	—	0	~~Morocco~~
Asia selected team	21 December 2016	—	1	Chinese Taipei
Oceania selected team	21 December 2016	—	1	Australia
South American Qualification Tournament	17 – 19 March 2017	Brazil	1	Brazil
Invited	2 August 2017	—	2	Italy; South Africa^{1}
Invited	5 September 2017	—	2	Argentina; Switzerland^{1}
Total			12	

1.Teams that made their debut.

== Group stage ==
The group winners and runners-up advanced to the quarter-finals. Those who finished in last place in their respective groups advanced to the 9th–12th classification stage.

=== Group A ===
Team	Pld	W	D	L	GF	GA	GD	Pts
Brazil	2	2	0	0	29	0	+29	6
Switzerland	2	0	1	1	3	13	−10	1
Chinese Taipei	2	0	1	1	3	16	−13	1

19 November
12:00

Chinese Taipei	3–3	Switzerland

Pavelló Municipal de Balaguer, Balaguer
20 November
14:00

Brazil	16–0	Chinese Taipei

Pavelló Municipal de Balaguer, Balaguer
21 November
15:00

Brazil	13–0	Switzerland

Pavelló Municipal de Balaguer, Balaguer

=== Group B ===
Team	Pld	W	D	L	GF	GA	GD	Pts
Argentina	2	2	0	0	14	2	+12	6
Catalonia	2	1	0	1	4	8	−4	3
France	2	0	0	2	3	11	−8	0

19 November
19:30

Catalonia	3–2	France

Pavelló Municipal de Balaguer, Balaguer
20 November
20:00

Catalonia	1–6	Argentina

Pavelló Municipal de Balaguer, Balaguer
21 November
17:00

Argentina	8–1	France

Pavelló Municipal de Balaguer, Balaguer

=== Group C ===
Team	Pld	W	D	L	GF	GA	GD	Pts
Colombia	2	2	0	0	29	0	+29	6
Italy	2	1	0	1	3	11	−8	3
South Africa	2	0	0	2	2	23	−21	0

19 November
21:30

South Africa	0–20	Colombia

Pavelló Municipal de Balaguer, Balaguer
20 November
18:00

Colombia	9–0	Italy

Pavelló Municipal de Balaguer, Balaguer
21 November
19:00

Italy	3–2	South Africa

Pavelló Municipal de Balaguer, Balaguer

=== Group D ===
Team	Pld	W	D	L	GF	GA	GD	Pts
Paraguay	2	2	0	0	9	3	+6	6
United States	2	1	0	1	9	8	+1	3
Australia	2	0	0	2	2	9	−7	0

19 November
16:00

Paraguay	3–0	Australia

Pavelló Municipal de Balaguer, Balaguer
20 November
16:00

Paraguay	6–3	United States

Pavelló Municipal de Balaguer, Balaguer
21 November
21:00

United States	6–2	Australia

Pavelló Municipal de Balaguer, Balaguer

== Knockout stage ==
=== Classification 9th–12th ===
Semi-finals (9th–12th)
November 23
France	6
Chinese Taipei	5
November 23
Australia	4
South Africa	2

9th place
November 24
France	2
Australia	4
11th place
November 24
Chinese Taipei	5
South Africa	2

=== Classification 1st–8th ===
Quarter-finals
November 23
Argentina	7
Switzerland	0
November 23
Paraguay	5
Italy	3
November 23
Colombia	5
United States	3
November 23
Catalonia	1
Brazil	7

Semi-finals
November 24
Argentina	4
Paraguay	3
November 24
Brazil	5
Colombia	2

Final
November 25
Brazil	4
Argentina	2
3rd place
November 25
Colombia	3
Paraguay	0

Semi-finals (5th–8th)
November 24
Italy	5
Switzerland	2
November 24
Catalonia	4 (3)
United States	4 (1)

5th place
November 25
Catalonia	2
Italy	0
7th place
November 25
Switzerland	1
United States	7

=== Classification 9th–12th (Semi-finals) ===
23 November
10:00

France	6–5	Chinese Taipei

Pavelló Municipal de Balaguer, Balaguer
23 November
12:00

Australia	4–2	South Africa

Pavelló Municipal de Balaguer, Balaguer

=== 11th place match ===
24 November
10:00

Chinese Taipei	5–2	South Africa

Pavelló Municipal de Balaguer, Balaguer

=== 9th place match ===
24 November
12:00

France	2–4	Australia

Pavelló Municipal de Balaguer, Balaguer

=== Quarter-finals ===
23 November
15:00

Argentina	7–0	Switzerland

Pavelló Municipal de Balaguer, Balaguer
23 November
17:00

Paraguay	5–3	Italy

Pavelló Municipal de Balaguer, Balaguer
23 November
19:00

Colombia	5–3	United States

Pavelló Municipal de Balaguer, Balaguer
23 November
21:00

Catalonia	1–7	Brazil

Pavelló Municipal de Balaguer, Balaguer

=== 5th–8th (Semi-finals) ===
24 November
10:00

Italy	6–5	Switzerland

Pavelló Municipal de Balaguer, Balaguer
24 November
12:00

Catalonia	4–4	United States
Penalties
	3–1

Pavelló Municipal de Balaguer, Balaguer

=== Semi-finals ===
24 November
19:30

Argentina	4–3	Paraguay

Pavelló Municipal de Balaguer, Balaguer
24 November
21:30

Brazil	5–2	Colombia

Pavelló Municipal de Balaguer, Balaguer

=== 7th place match ===
25 November
12:00

Switzerland	1–7	United States

Pavelló Municipal de Balaguer, Balaguer

=== 5th place match ===
25 November
16:00

Catalonia	2–0	Italy

Pavelló Municipal de Balaguer, Balaguer

=== Third place play-off ===
25 November
18:30

Colombia	3–0	Paraguay

Pavelló Municipal de Balaguer, Balaguer

=== Final ===
25 November
21:00

Brazil	4–2	Argentina

Pavelló Municipal de Balaguer, Balaguer

Winners

Brazil

== Final tournament team rankings ==
Pos.	Team	Pld	W	D	L	Pts	GF	GA	GD
1	Brazil	5	5	0	0	15	45	5	+40
2	Argentina	5	4	0	1	12	27	9	+18
3	Colombia	5	4	0	1	12	39	8	+31
4	Paraguay	5	3	0	2	9	17	13	+4
5th through 8th
5	Catalonia	5	2	1	2	7	11	19	−8
6	Italy	5	2	0	3	6	11	20	−9
7	United States	5	2	1	2	7	24	18	+6
8	Switzerland	5	0	1	4	1	6	32	−26
9th through 12th
9	Australia	4	2	0	2	6	10	13	−3
10	France	4	1	0	3	3	11	18	−7
11	Chinese Taipei	4	1	1	2	4	13	24	−11
12	South Africa	4	0	0	4	0	6	27	−21
