= 2009 UEFS Futsal Women's Championship =

2009 UEFS futsal european women's championship
IV. European Women's Championship

Tournament details
- Host country: Poland
- Dates: 8 December – 12 December
- Teams: 7 (from 1 confederation)
- Venue: 1 (in 1 host city)

Final positions
- Champions: Russia (3rd title)
- Runners-up: Czech Republic
- Third place: Catalonia

The 2009 UEFS Futsal Women's Championship was the 4th women's UEFS futsal championship, held in Paczków (Poland).

Belgium withdrew meaning that only seven teams were in the competition.

== Teams ==
Group A
Bulgaria
Czech Republic
(Galicia (Spain)) Galicia
Poland

Group B
Catalonia
Italy
Russia

== Group stage ==
=== Group A ===
GROUP A	Pts	P	W	D	L	+	-	dif
(Galicia (Spain)) Galicia	9	3	3	0	0	18	4	+14
Czech Republic	6	3	2	0	1	13	6	+7
Poland	3	3	1	0	2	9	8	+1
Bulgaria	0	3	0	0	3	3	25	-22

8 December - 18:30
8 December - 18:30	Czech Republic	4-2	Poland	Paczków

8 December - 20:00
8 December - 20:00	Galicia	11-2	Bulgaria	Paczków

9 December - 16:30
9 December - 16:30	Czech Republic	2-3	Galicia	Paczków

9 December - 18:00
9 December - 18:00	Poland	7-0	Bulgaria	Paczków

10 December - 15:00
10 December - 15:00	Bulgaria	1-7	Czech Republic	Paczków

10 December - 18:00
10 December - 18:00	Galicia	4-0	Poland	Paczków

=== Group B ===
GROUP B	Pts	P	W	D	L	+	+	dif
Russia	6	2	2	0	0	16	2	+14
Catalonia	3	2	1	0	1	14	3	+11
Italy	0	2	0	0	2	0	25	-25

8 December - 21:30
8 December - 21:30	Catalonia	12-0	Italy	Paczków

9 December - 20:00
9 December - 20:00	Russia	3-2	Catalonia	Paczków

10 December - 16:30
10 December - 16:30	Russia	13-0	Italy	Paczków

== Final round ==
Semi-finals
11 December
(Galicia (Spain)) Galicia	4
Catalonia	1
11 December
Russia	2
Czech Republic	1

Final
12 December
(Galicia (Spain)) Galicia	disq*
Russia
Third place
12 December Friendly Match
Catalonia	0
Czech Republic	1

Semifinals

11 December - 18:00
11 December - 18:00	Galicia	4-1	Catalonia	Paczków

11 December - 20:00
11 December - 20:00	Russia	2-1 OT	Czech Republic	Paczków

5th-6th places

11 December - 16:30
11 December - 16:30	Poland	12-1	Italy	Paczków

Friendly match

12 December - 17:00
12 December - 17:00	Catalonia	0-1	Czech Republic	Paczków

FINAL

12 December - 19:00
12 December - 19:00	Russia	disq*	Galicia	Paczków

* Galicia was disqualified

== Final standings ==
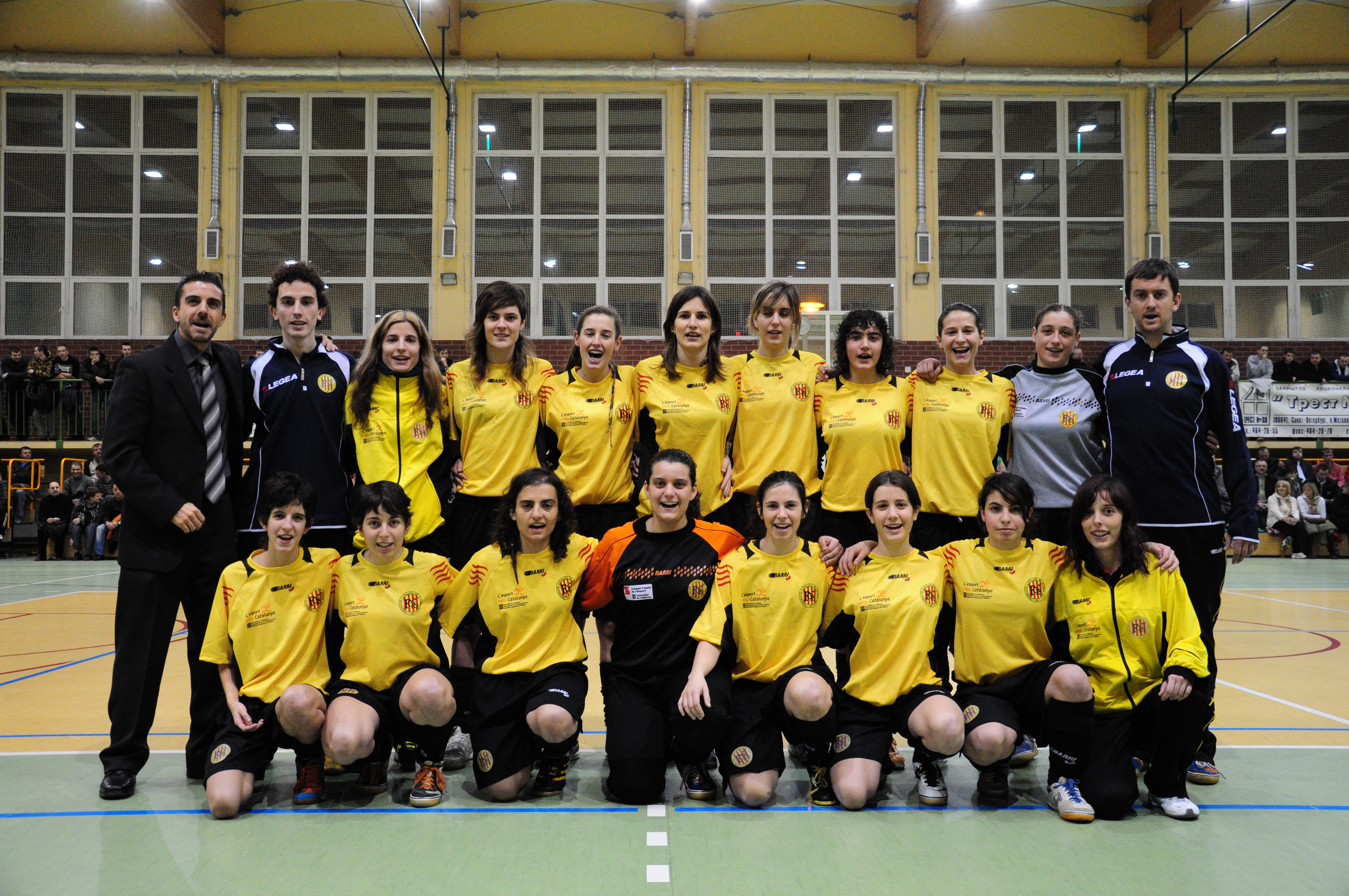
Catalonia national futsal team

Final standings
	Russia
Silver medal	Czech Republic
Bronze medal	Catalonia
4.	Poland
5.	Bulgaria
6.	Italy
disq.	(Galicia (Spain)) Galicia
