= 2013 AMF Futsal Women's World Cup =

2013 II AMF Futsal Women's World Cup
Campeonato Mundial Femenino de futsal de la AMF 2013

Tournament details
- Host country: Colombia
- Dates: 7–16 November
- Teams: 16 (from 6 confederations)
- Venue: 1 (in 1 host city)

Final positions
- Champions: Colombia (1st title)
- Runners-up: Venezuela
- Third place: Czech Republic
- Fourth place: Argentina

Tournament statistics
- Matches played: 32
- Goals scored: 217 (6.78 per match)
- Top scorer: (Colombia) Paula Botero (15 goals)
- Best goalkeeper: (Colombia) Magaly Vergara

The 2013 AMF Futsal Women's World Cup was the 2nd edition of the AMF Futsal Women's World Cup. The tournament was held in Colombia from 7 to 16 November in Barrancabermeja. Sixteen national teams from all confederations participated in the tournament. Colombia won the tournament by defeating Venezuela 3–2 in the final, achieving its first title.

== Venues ==
Matches were played in one venue in Barrancabermeja.

Barrancabermeja
Coliseo Luis Fernando Castellanos
Capacity: 7,000

== Participating teams ==
In addition to host nation Colombia, 15 nations qualified.

Tournament	Date	Venue	Qualified teams	
Host	—	—	1	Colombia
2011 UEFS Futsal Women's Championship	5 – 10 December 2011	Czech Republic	4	Czech Republic; Russia; Catalonia; ~~France~~; Italy
Africa selected teams	—	—	1	Morocco^{1}
Asia selected teams	—	—	1	Chinese Taipei^{1}
Central America selected teams	—	—	3	Canada^{1} El Salvador^{1} United States^{1}
Oceania selected teams	—	—	1	Australia
South America selected teams	—	—	5	Argentina; Brazil^{1} Paraguay; Uruguay^{1} Venezuela
Total			16	

1. Teams that made their debut.

== Group stage ==
The group winners and runners up advanced to the quarter-finals.

=== Group A ===
Team	Pld	W	D	L	GF	GA	GD	Pts
Colombia	3	3	0	0	37	0	+37	9
Australia	3	2	0	1	16	6	+10	6
Canada	3	0	1	2	6	29	−23	1
Morocco	3	0	1	2	5	29	−24	1

7 November
20:00 UTC-5

Colombia	16–0	Canada
Paula Botero ??', ??', ??', ??', ??', ??', ??'; Natalia Riveros ??', ??', ??'; Ingrid Jaramillo ??', ??'; Shandira Wright ??'; Andrea Garzón ??'; Yurika Mármol ??'; Paola Estrada ??'

Coliseo Luis Fernando Castellanos, Barrancabermeja
Referee: Florêncio Conceição (Brazil), Mariano Garcés (Catalonia)
8 November
14:00 UTC-5

Australia	8–0	Morocco
Caitlin Jarvie ??', ??', ??'; Jodie Bain ??', ??'; Isabella Walker ??'; Fabiana Perfilio ??'; Jade Banks ??'

Coliseo Luis Fernando Castellanos, Barrancabermeja
Referee: Alfredo Pérez (Colombia), Phillipe Dor (USA)
9 November
15:30 UTC-5

Canada	5–5	Morocco
Keyla Moreno ??', ??', ??'; Nicole Carvalho ??'; Monica Cordeiro ??'		Bassira Moudou ??', ??'; Nassi Delilah ??'; Amarrvur Hakimi ??'; Kaovang Sayta ??'

Coliseo Luis Fernando Castellanos, Barrancabermeja
Referee: Gasparo Franco (Italy), Jorge Paladines (Paraguay)
9 November
20:00 UTC-5

Colombia	5–0	Australia
Jade Banks ??' (o.g.); Natalia Riveros ??'; Paula Botero ??'; Andrea Garzón ??'; Shandira Wright ??'

Coliseo Luis Fernando Castellanos, Barrancabermeja
Referee: Claudia Correa (Uruguay), Phillipe Dor (USA)
11 November
14:00 UTC-5

Australia	8–1	Canada
Caitlin Jarvie ??', ??'; Fabiana Perfilio ??'; Isabella Walker ??'; Jade Banks ??'; Kate Lutkins ??', ??'; Jodie Baien ??'		Ashley Osorio ??'

Coliseo Luis Fernando Castellanos, Barrancabermeja
Referee: Javier Petrino (Argentina), Mark Alvarez (Colombia)
11 November
20:00 UTC-5

Colombia	16–0	Morocco
Paula Botero ??', ??', ??', ??'; Yurika Mármol ??', ??', ??'; Ingrid Jaramillo ??', ??', ??'; Leidy Calderón ??', ??', ??'; Natalia Riveros ??'; Marcela Calderón ??'; Andrea Garzón ??'

Coliseo Luis Fernando Castellanos, Barrancabermeja
Referee: Javier Petrino (Argentina), Mark Alvarez (Colombia)

=== Group B ===
Team	Pld	W	D	L	GF	GA	GD	Pts
Venezuela	3	3	0	0	22	1	+21	9
Catalonia	3	2	0	1	8	2	+6	6
Italy	3	0	1	2	3	13	−10	1
Uruguay	3	0	1	2	2	17	−15	1

7 November
15:30 UTC-5

Venezuela	11–0	Uruguay
Astrid Mikilena Romero ??', ??', ??'; Yucelis Camargo ??', ??'; Petra Cabrera ??', ??'; Yulenis Hernández ??', ??'; Alejandra Prieto ??', ??'

Coliseo Luis Fernando Castellanos, Barrancabermeja
Referee: Javier Petrino (Argentina) y Fabio Giménez (Paraguay)
7 November
18:30 UTC-5

Catalonia	4–0	Italy
Lerena Beatriz Alonso ??'; Laia Rodriguez Tormo ??'; Sheila Barrull Santoro ??'; Anna Colomer ??'

Coliseo Luis Fernando Castellanos, Barrancabermeja
Referee: Claudia Correa (Uruguay), Ana Milena Espinosa (Colombia)
9 November
14:00 UTC-5

Italy	2–2	Uruguay
Gaia Tombolini ??'; Arianna Rossi ??'		Paula Novo ??'; Andrea Pereira ??'

Coliseo Luis Fernando Castellanos, Barrancabermeja
Referee: Octavio Perdomo (Colombia), Luz Dary Campo (Colombia)
9 November
18:30 UTC-5

Catalonia	0–2	Venezuela
		Yessica Rodriguez ??'; Yucelis Camargo ??'

Coliseo Luis Fernando Castellanos, Barrancabermeja
Referee: Javier Petrino (Argentina), Florêncio Conceição (Brazil)
11 November
15:30 UTC-5

Venezuela	7–1	Italy
Yessica Rodriguez ??', ??', ??'; Yulenis Hernandez ??'; Alejandra Prieto ??'; Estefanía Fernández ??', ??'		Gaia Tombolini ??'; Yucelis Camargo ??'

Coliseo Luis Fernando Castellanos, Barrancabermeja
Referee: Alfredo Pérez (Colombia), Sergio Lizcano (Colombia)
11 November
18:30 UTC-5

Catalonia	4–0	Uruguay
Jèssica Todó ??'; Beatriz Alonso ??'; Gisela Andrés ??'; Carolina Martínez ??'

Coliseo Luis Fernando Castellanos, Barrancabermeja

=== Group C ===
Team	Pld	W	D	L	GF	GA	GD	Pts
Paraguay	3	2	0	1	8	5	+3	6
Chinese Taipei	3	2	0	1	8	5	+3	6
Russia	3	2	0	1	6	4	+2	6
Brazil	3	0	0	3	6	13	−7	0

8 November
14:30 UTC-5

Paraguay	3–2	Chinese Taipei
Silvia Getto ??'; Anabel Rodriguez ??'; Noelia Barrios ??'		Shieh I Ling ??'; Lin Yu Hui ??'

Coliseo Luis Fernando Castellanos, Barrancabermeja
Referee: Florêncio Conceição (Brazil), Javier Petrino (Argentina)
8 November
20:00 UTC-5

Russia	4–3	Brazil
Merkulova Elena ??'; Zhuravleva Natalia ??'; Usenko Yana ??'; Prudnikova Brsitina ??'		Aline Miquelino ??'; Claudete Silva ??'; Eliana Araujo ??'

Coliseo Luis Fernando Castellanos, Barrancabermeja
Referee: Jesus Villarraga (Colombia), Ana Milena Espinosa (Colombia)
10 November
15:30 UTC-5

Brazil	2–5	Chinese Taipei
Tsai Ming-Jung ??', o.g.' Suzana Pereira ??'		Chiang Pei Ling ??'; Lee Yi Chi ??'; Shieh I Ling ??', ??'; Yu-Hui Lin ??'

Coliseo Luis Fernando Castellanos, Barrancabermeja
Referee: Jesus Villarraga (Colombia), Fabio Jiménez Ángel (Paraguay)
10 November
18:30 UTC-5

Russia	2–1	Paraguay
Merkulova Elena ??'; Prudnikova Kristina ??'		Gloria Rodriguez ??'

Coliseo Luis Fernando Castellanos, Barrancabermeja
Referee: Claudia Correia (Uruguay), Phillip Dor (USA)
12 November
15:30 UTC-5

Russia	0–1	Chinese Taipei
		Shieh I Ling ??'

Coliseo Luis Fernando Castellanos, Barrancabermeja
Referee: Jesus Villarraga (Colombia), Alfredo Perez (Colombia)
12 November
18:30 UTC-5

Paraguay	4–1	Brazil
Noelia Barrios ??', ??'; Anabel Rodríguez ??'; Angélica Vásquez ??'		Aline Miquelino ??'

Coliseo Luis Fernando Castellanos, Barrancabermeja
Referee: Javier Petrino (Argentina), Mariano Garcés (Catalonia)

=== Group D ===
Team	Pld	W	D	L	GF	GA	GD	Pts
Czech Republic	3	2	1	0	14	6	+8	7
Argentina	3	1	1	1	10	6	+4	4
United States	3	1	0	2	7	12	−5	3
El Salvador	3	1	0	2	11	18	−7	3

7 November
15:30 UTC-5

Czech Republic	7–3	El Salvador
Šárka Holečková ??', ??', ??'; Klára Cahynová ??'; Jitka Chlastáková ??'; Sára Plzáková ??'; Petra Divišová ??'		Debbie Gómez ??'; Alejandra Herrera ??'; Joselín Rivas ??'

Coliseo Luis Fernando Castellanos, Barrancabermeja
Referee: Jesus Villaraga (Colombia), Alex Tovar (Venezuela)
8 November
18:30 UTC-5

Argentina	1–2	United States
Ana Ontiveros ??'		Katie Osborne ??'; Rossana Kamal ??'

Coliseo Luis Fernando Castellanos, Barrancabermeja
Referee: Claudia Currier (Argentina), Fabio Jiménez Ángel (Paraguay)
10 November
14:00 UTC-5

United States	4–6	El Salvador
Rossana Kamal ??', ??'; Andrea Carrara ??', ??'		Joselin Rivas ??'; Alejandra Herrera ??'; Ingrid Ramos ??'; Debbie Gómez ??', ??'; Karen Landaverde ??'

Coliseo Luis Fernando Castellanos, Barrancabermeja
Referee: Sergio Lizcano (Colombia), Octavio Perdomo (Colombia)
10 November
20:00 UTC-5

Argentina	2–2	Czech Republic
Maria Victoria Pintos ??'; Paula Leiva ??'		Sára Plzáková ??'; Jitka Chlastáková ??'

Coliseo Luis Fernando Castellanos, Barrancabermeja
Referee: Mariano Garcés (Catalonia), Florêncio Conceição (Brazil)
12 November
14:00 UTC-5

Argentina	7–2	El Salvador
Maria Argento ??', ??', ??'; Ana Ontiveros ??'; Paula Lewis ??'; Maria Pinto ??'; Jimena Blanco ??'		Karen Landaverde ??', ??'

Coliseo Luis Fernando Castellanos, Barrancabermeja
Referee: Phillip Dor (USA), Fabio Jiménez Ángel (Paraguay)
12 November
20:00 UTC-5

Czech Republic	5–1	United States
Klára Cahynová ??'; Jitka Chlastáková ??'; Petra Divišová ??', ??'; Barbora Hýlová ??'		Rossana Kamal ??'

Coliseo Luis Fernando Castellanos, Barrancabermeja
Referee: Octavio Perdomo (Colombia), Sergio Lizcano (Colombia)

== Knockout stage ==
Quarter-finals
13 November
Colombia	4
Catalonia	0
14 November
Paraguay	3
Argentina	4
13 November
Venezuela	6
Australia	2
14 November
Czech Republic	8
Chinese Taipei	3

Semi-finals
15 November
Colombia	5
Argentina	0
15 November
Venezuela	1
Czech Republic	0

Final
16 November
Colombia	3
Venezuela	2
Third place
16 November
Argentina	3
Czech Republic	4

=== Quarter-finals ===
13 November
18:30 UTC-5

Venezuela	6–2	Australia
Yucelis Camargo ??', ??', ??', ??'; Carla Romero ??'; Astrid Romero ??'		Fabiana Perfilio ??', ??'

Coliseo Luis Fernando Castellanos, Barrancabermeja
Referee: Jesús Vilarraga (Colombia), Alfredo Pérez (Colombia)
13 November
20:00 UTC-5

Colombia	4–0	Catalonia
Shandira Wright ??'; Natalia Riveros ??'; Paula Botero ??'; Andrea Garzón ??'

Coliseo Luis Fernando Castellanos, Barrancabermeja
Referee: Florêncio Conceição (Brazil), Phillip Dor (USA)
14 November
18:30 UTC-5

Paraguay	3–4	Argentina
Anabel Rodriguez ??'; Mara Rolón ??'; Ana González ??'		Ana Ontiveros ??', ??'; Jimena Blanco ??'; Maria Argento ??'

Coliseo Luis Fernando Castellanos, Barrancabermeja
Referee: Phillip Dor (USA), Claudia Correa (Uruguay)
14 November
20:00 UTC-5

Czech Republic	8–3	Chinese Taipei
Jitka Chlastáková ??', ??'; Adéla Zehererová ??'; Šárka Holečková ??'; Adéla Ondrášková ??'; Petra Divišová ??'; Sára Plzáková ??'; Klára Cahynová ??'		Shieh I Ling ??'; Yu-Hui Lin ??'; Huang Siang Ling ??'

Coliseo Luis Fernando Castellanos, Barrancabermeja
Referee: Octavio Perdomo (Colombia), Sergio Lizcano (Colombia)

=== Semi-finals ===
15 November
18:30 UTC-5

Venezuela	1–0	Czech Republic
Marinel Arquizonez ??'

Coliseo Luis Fernando Castellanos, Barrancabermeja
Referee: Javier Petrino (Argentina), Fabio Jiménez Ángel (Paraguay)
15 November
20:00 UTC-5

Colombia	5–0	Argentina
Shandira Wright ??', ??', ??'; Paula Botero ??'; Natalia Riveros ??'

Coliseo Luis Fernando Castellanos, Barrancabermeja
Referee: Florêncio Conceição (Brazil), Mariano Garcés (Catalonia)

=== Third place play-off ===
16 November
18:30 UTC-5

Argentina	3–4	Czech Republic
Jimena Blanco ??', ??'; Maria Argento ??'		Sára Plzáková ??'; Lenka Steffanová ??'; Petra Divišová ??'; Šárka Holečková ??'

Coliseo Luis Fernando Castellanos, Barrancabermeja
Referee: Ana Espinosa (Argentina), Octavio Perdomo (Colombia)

=== Final ===
16 November
20:00 UTC-5

Colombia	3–2	Venezuela
Andrea Garzón ??'; Shandira Wright ??'; Paula Botero ??'		Yucelis Camargo ??'; Yessica Rodríguez ??'

Coliseo Luis Fernando Castellanos, Barrancabermeja
Referee: Javier Petrino (Argentina), Fabio Jiménez (Paraguay)

Winners
Colombia

== Tournament team rankings ==
Pos.	Team	Pld	W	D	L	Pts	GF	GA	GD
1	Colombia	6	6	0	0	18	33	6	+27
2	Venezuela	6	3	2	1	11	32	19	+13
3	Czech Republic	6	4	1	1	13	31	18	+13
4	Argentina	6	3	1	2	10	26	24	+2
Eliminated in the quarter-finals
5	Australia	4	2	0	2	6	18	12	+6
6	Catalonia	4	2	0	2	6	8	6	+2
7	Paraguay	4	2	0	2	6	11	9	+2
8	Chinese Taipei	4	2	0	2	6	11	13	−2
Eliminated in the group stage
9	Russia	3	2	0	1	6	6	4	+2
10	United States	3	1	0	2	3	7	12	−5
11	El Salvador	3	1	0	2	3	11	18	−7
12	Italy	3	0	1	2	1	3	13	−10
13	Uruguay	3	0	1	2	1	2	17	−15
14	Canada	3	0	1	2	1	6	29	−23
15	Morocco	3	0	1	2	1	5	29	−24
16	Brazil	3	0	0	3	0	6	13	−7
