= 2008 AMF Futsal Women's World Cup =

Football tournament

2008 I AMF Futsal Women's World Championship
Primer Campionat Mundial Futbol Sala Femení
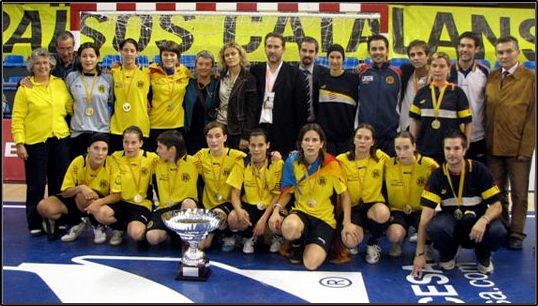
- Catalonia national team

Tournament details
- Host country: Catalonia, Spain
- Dates: 29 September – 5 October
- Teams: 12 (from 3 confederations)
- Venue: 1 (in 1 host city)

Final positions
- Champions: Catalonia (1st title)
- Runners-up: (Galicia (Spain)) Galicia
- Third place: Colombia
- Fourth place: Russia

Tournament statistics
- Matches played: 28
- Goals scored: 172 (6.14 per match)

The 2008 AMF Futsal Women's World Cup, supported by the AMF, was the inaugural edition of the AMF Futsal Women's World Cup. The tournament was held in Reus, Catalonia, from 29 September to 5 October 2008. It was organized by the Catalonia Futsal Federation and there were 12 national teams in the competition.

== Teams ==
Group A
Russia
(Galicia (Spain)) Galicia
Ukraine

Group B
Argentina
Belgium
Venezuela

Group C
Australia
Italy
Paraguay

Group D
Catalonia
Colombia
Czech Republic

== First round ==
GROUP A	Pts	P	W	D	L	G+	G-	GD
Russia	4	2	2	0	0	7	4	+3
(Galicia (Spain)) Galicia	2	2	1	0	1	7	7	0
Ukraine	0	2	0	0	2	6	9	-3

September 29 - 15:30
September 29 - 15:30	Russia	3-2	Galicia	Pavelló Olímpic de Reus
September 29 - 15:30	Dobrosostkaya 8', 21'; Rabakh 39'		Fernández 16'; Ferreyro 23'	Pavelló Olímpic de Reus

September 30 - 16:00
September 30 - 16:00	Galicia	5-4	Ukraine	Pavelló Olímpic de Reus
September 30 - 16:00	Cadavid 4', 30'; Andre 8'; Tesouro 16', 28'		Arkel 13', 24'; Nifanteya 30', 37'	Pavelló Olímpic de Reus

October 1–16:00
October 1–16:00	Russia	4-2	Ukraine	Pavelló Olímpic de Reus
October 1–16:00	Lituinova 2'; Volyakova 7'; Kremlova 14'; Vlogova 17'		Ignatyeva 5'; Arkel 38'	Pavelló Olímpic de Reus

GROUP B	Pts	P	W	D	L	G+	G-	GD
Argentina	4	2	2	0	0	14	3	+11
Venezuela	2	2	1	0	1	7	7	0
Belgium	0	2	0	0	2	2	13	-11

September 29 - 17:15
September 29 - 17:15	Venezuela	5-1	Belgium	Pavelló Olímpic de Reus
September 29 - 17:15	Camargo 6', 7'; Ramírez 14'; Conde 35'; Miquilena 39'		Meunier 3'	Pavelló Olímpic de Reus

September 30 - 17:45
September 30 - 17:45	Belgium	1-8	Argentina	Pavelló Olímpic de Reus
September 30 - 17:45	Meunier 3'		Alcaraz 4', 20'; Samudio 15', 24'; Banini 22'; Blanco 25'; Meza 32'; Madiano 39'	Pavelló Olímpic de Reus

October 1–17:45
October 1–17:45	Venezuela	2-6	Argentina	Pavelló Olímpic de Reus
October 1–17:45	Cabral 25'; Hernández 32'		Banini 4', 7', 23'; Villalba 22'; Alcaraz 32'; Meza 37'	Pavelló Olímpic de Reus

GROUP C	Pts	P	W	D	L	G+	G-	GD
Australia	4	2	2	0	0	15	2	+13
Paraguay	1	2	1	1	0	3	7	-4
Italy	1	2	0	1	1	5	14	-9

September 29 - 19:00
September 29 - 19:00	Paraguay	3-3	Italy	Pavelló Olímpic de Reus
September 29 - 19:00	Colman 4',9'; Díaz 39'		Ruggiero 15'; Gisondi 16'; Del Picco 26'	Pavelló Olímpic de Reus

September 30 - 19:30
September 30 - 19:30	Italy	2-11	Australia	Pavelló Olímpic de Reus
September 30 - 19:30	Uccelini 32'; Ruggiero 35'		Garuen 1'; Mann 2', 2'; Burgess 2', 19'; Banks 7'; Hammond 8'; Kent 8'; Tanson 16'; Enreli 28', 39'	Pavelló Olímpic de Reus

October 1–19:30
October 1–19:30	Paraguay	0-4	Australia	Pavelló Olímpic de Reus
October 1–19:30			Garuen 7'; Burgess 19', 19'; Mann 23'	Pavelló Olímpic de Reus

GROUP D	Pts	P	W	D	L	G+	G-	GD
Colombia	3	2	1	1	0	3	2	+1
Catalonia	2	2	1	0	1	5	2	+3
Czech Republic	1	2	0	1	1	1	5	-4

September 29 - 19:00
September 29 - 19:00	Catalonia	4-0	Czech Republic	Pavelló Olímpic de Reus
September 29 - 19:00	Vidal 1'; Manzano 11', 28'; Torres 24'			Pavelló Olímpic de Reus

September 30 - 21:15
September 30 - 21:15	Czech Republic	1-1	Colombia	Pavelló Olímpic de Reus
September 30 - 21:15	Trojakova 39'		Montoya 14'	Pavelló Olímpic de Reus

October 1–21:15
October 1–21:15	Catalonia	1-2	Colombia	Pavelló Olímpic de Reus
October 1–21:15	Sánchez 8'		Montoya 26', 32'	Pavelló Olímpic de Reus

== Final round ==
=== Classification 9th–12th ===
Semifinals (9th–12th)
October 3
Ukraine	9
Italy	0
October 3
Belgium	1
Czech Republic	4

9th place
October 4
Ukraine	1
Czech Republic	2
11th place
October 4
Italy (aet)	4
Belgium	3

=== Classification 1st–8th ===
Quarter finals
October 3
Russia	3
Venezuela	1
October 3
Australia	2
Catalonia	3
October 3
Argentina	1
(Galicia (Spain)) Galicia	8
October 3
Colombia	5
Paraguay	1

Semifinals
October 4
Russia	2
Catalonia	3
October 4
(Galicia (Spain)) Galícia	3* (2)
Colombia	3 (1)

Final
October 5
Catalonia	4
(Galicia (Spain)) Galicia	0
3rd place
October 5
Russia	4
Colombia	6

Semifinals (5th–8th)
October 4
Venezuela	3
Australia	4
October 4
Argentina	4
Paraguay	1

5th place
October 5
Australia	0
Argentina	5
7th place
October 5
Venezuela	3
Paraguay	4

=== Day 4 ===
Places 9-12

October 3–10:00
October 3–10:00	Ukraine	9-0	Italy	Pavelló Olímpic de Reus
October 3–10:00	Youdina 3', 24', 33'; Nifanteya 9', 15'; Lukyanenko 14'; Usenko 26', 27'; Ignatyeva 39'			Pavelló Olímpic de Reus

October 3–11:30
October 3–11:30	Belgium	1-4	Czech Republic	Pavelló Olímpic de Reus
October 3–11:30	Andre 22'		Krejcarova 1'; Divišová 2'; Hoferková 8'; Ondrášková 18	Pavelló Olímpic de Reus

Quarter finals

October 3–16:00
October 3–16:00	Russia	3-1	Venezuela	Pavelló Olímpic de Reus
October 3–16:00	Volyakova 15'; Kremlova 30'; Mironova 35'		Conde 16'	Pavelló Olímpic de Reus

October 3–17:30
October 3–17:30	Argentina	1-8	Galicia	Pavelló Olímpic de Reus
October 3–17:30	Samudio 26'		Teijero 3',37'; Cadavid 6'; Andre 8'; Ferreyro 10'; Tesouro 26'; Outon 39'; Chávez 39'	Pavelló Olímpic de Reus

October 3–19:15
October 3–19:15	Australia	2-3	Catalonia	Pavelló Olímpic de Reus
October 3–19:15	Burgess 5', 19'		Vidal 19'; Navarro 35'; Manzano 38'	Pavelló Olímpic de Reus

October 3–20:45
October 3–20:45	Colombia	5-1	Paraguay	Pavelló Olímpic de Reus
October 3–20:45	Peduzine 1', 33'; Imbachi 13'; Montoya 34'; Rivero 39'		Díaz 39'	Pavelló Olímpic de Reus

=== Day 5 ===
Places 11-12

October 4–9:00
October 4–9:00	Italy	4-3 (aet)	Belgium	Pavelló Olímpic de Reus
October 4–9:00	Ruggiero 30'; Grandino 30', 45'; Pagliara 46'		Bordenza 8'; Meunier 24', 42'	Pavelló Olímpic de Reus

Places 9-10

October 4–10:30
October 4–10:30	Ukraine	1-2	Czech Republic	Pavelló Olímpic de Reus
October 4–10:30	Arkel 36'		Krejcarova 13'; Divišová 35'	Pavelló Olímpic de Reus

Places 5-8

October 4–12:00
October 4–12:00	Venezuela	3-4	Australia	Pavelló Olímpic de Reus
October 4–12:00	Ramírez 24'; Conde 25'; Hernández 34'		Kent 2'; Burgess 21', 22'; Hammond 30'	Pavelló Olímpic de Reus

October 4–13:30
October 4–13:30	Argentina	4-1	Paraguay	Pavelló Olímpic de Reus
October 4–13:30	Alcaraz 6'; Banini 13', 23', 29'		Díaz 4'	Pavelló Olímpic de Reus

Semifinals

October 4–16:30
October 4–16:30	Russia	2-3	Catalonia	Pavelló Olímpic de Reus
October 4–16:30	Kremlova 1'; 29'		Rodríguez 16'; Vidal 28'; Navarro 29'	Pavelló Olímpic de Reus

October 4–18:15
October 4–18:15	Galicia	3*-3	Colombia	Pavelló Olímpic de Reus
October 4–18:15	Ferreiro 11'; Fernández 19'; Cadavid 19'	(2-1 penalties)	Calderón 17'; Riveros 32'; Montoya 36'	Pavelló Olímpic de Reus

=== Final day ===
Places 7-8

October 5–10:00
October 5–10:00	Venezuela	3-4	Paraguay	Pavelló Olímpic de Reus
October 5–10:00	Camargo 24', 26'; Hernández 25'		Mancuello 18'; Ferreyra 19'; Salinas 28'; Cabrera 29'	Pavelló Olímpic de Reus

Places 5-6

October 5–11:30
October 5–11:30	Australia	0-5	Argentina	Pavelló Olímpic de Reus
October 5–11:30			Madiano 17', 33'; Alcaraz 19', 35', 37'	Pavelló Olímpic de Reus

Places 3-4

October 5–15:15
October 5–15:15	Russia	4-6	Colombia	Pavelló Olímpic de Reus
October 5–15:15	Litvinova 9'; Rabakh 12'; Polyakova 21'; Polyakova 35'		Imbachi 1'; Munera 2'; Rendón 28', 31', 32', 39'	Pavelló Olímpic de Reus

FINAL

October 5–17:00
October 5–17:00	Catalonia	4-0	Galicia	Pavelló Olímpic de Reus
October 5–17:00	Navarro 12', 18'; L. Rodríguez 36', 39'			Pavelló Olímpic de Reus

Winners
Catalonia

== Final standings ==
Final standings
Gold	Catalonia
Silver	(Galicia (Spain)) Galicia
Bronze	Colombia
4	Russia
5	Argentina
6	Australia
7	Paraguay
8	Venezuela
9	Czech Republic
10	Ukraine
11	Italy
12	Belgium
