= 2011 UEFS Futsal Women's Championship =

2011 UEFS Futsal European Women's Championship
V. European Women's Championship

Tournament details
- Host country: Czech Republic
- Dates: 5 – 10 December
- Teams: 5 (from 1 confederation)
- Venue(s): 1 (in 1 host city)

Final positions
- Champions: Czech Republic (2nd title)
- Runners-up: Russia
- Third place: Catalonia
- Fourth place: France

Tournament statistics
- Matches played: 10
- Goals scored: 77 (7.7 per match)

The 2011 UEFS Futsal Women's Championship was the 5th women's UEFS futsal championship, held in Prague, (Czech Republic) from 5 December to 10 December.

There were 5 teams in the competition: Czech Republic, Russia, Catalonia, France and Italy. The championship was played in a league system and the Czech Republic won their second women's title in four years.

== Championship ==
Legend

Pts = Total points
P = Games played
W = Games won
(w) = Games won at penalties/OT
(l) = Games lost at penalties/OT
L = Games lost

+ = Goals scored
- = Goals against
dif = Difference of goals

	Pts	P	W	w	l	L	+	-	dif
Czech Republic	12	4	4	0	0	0	28	5	+23
Russia	7	4	1	2	0	1	16	9	+7
Catalonia	7	4	2	1	0	1	13	7	+6
France	4	4	1	0	1	2	16	19	-3
Italy	0	4	0	0	0	4	4	37	-33

6 December - 17:00
6 December - 17:00	Catalonia	8-1	Italy	Prague

6 December - 18:30
6 December - 18:30	France	3-9	Czech Republic	Prague

7 December - 17:00
7 December - 17:00	Russia	5-4(ot)	France	Prague

7 December - 18:30
7 December - 18:30	Italy	1-12	Czech Republic	Prague

8 December - 17:00
8 December - 17:00	Russia	8-0(ot)	Italy	Prague

8 December - 18:30
8 December - 18:30	Czech Republic	4-0	Catalonia	Prague

9 December - 17:00
9 December - 17:00	Italy	2-9	France	Prague

9 December - 18:30
9 December - 18:30	Catalonia	2-22-1 pen	Russia	Prague

10 December - 17:00
10 December - 17:00	France	0-3	Catalonia	Prague

10 December - 18:30
10 December - 18:30	Czech Republic	3-1	Russia	Prague

== Final standings ==
Final standings
	Czech Republic
	Russia
	Catalonia
4.	France
5.	Italy
