= 2007 UEFS Futsal Women's Championship =

2007 UEFS Futsal European Women's Championship
III. European Women's Championship

Tournament details
- Host country: Czech Republic
- Dates: 12 – 16 December
- Teams: 5 (from 1 confederation)
- Venue: 1 (in 1 host city)

Final positions
- Champions: Czech Republic (1st title)
- Runners-up: Russia
- Third place: Slovakia
- Fourth place: Ukraine

Tournament statistics
- Matches played: 10
- Goals scored: 130 (13 per match)

The 2007 UEFS Futsal Women's Championship was the 3rd women's UEFS futsal championship, held in Luhačovice, (Czech Republic) from 12 December to 16 December.

There were 5 teams in the competition: Czech Republic, Lithuania, Russia, Slovakia and Ukraine.

The championship was played in a league system and the Czech Republic won their first ever women's title.

== Championship ==
	Pts	P	W	D	L	+	-	dif
Czech Republic	12	4	4	0	0	45	2	+43
Russia	9	4	3	0	1	43	4	+39
Slovakia	6	4	2	0	2	29	5	+24
Ukraine	3	4	1	0	3	8	56	-48
Lithuania	0	4	0	0	4	5	63	-58

12 December - 18:00
12 December - 18:00	Russia	18-1	Lithuania	Luhačovice

13 December - 17:00
13 December - 17:00	Slovakia	0-1	Russia	Luhačovice

13 December - 19:00
13 December - 19:00	Czech Republic	21-0	Lithuania	Luhačovice

14 December - 17:00
14 December - 17:00	Lithuania	0-17	Slovakia	Luhačovice

14 December - 19:00
14 December - 19:00	Ukraine	0-18	Czech Republic	Luhačovice

15 December - 9:00
15 December - 9:00	Lithuania	4-7	Ukraine	Luhačovice

15 December - 17:00
15 December - 17:00	Russia	22-0	Ukraine	Luhačovice

15 December - 19:00
15 December - 19:00	Czech Republic	3-0	Slovakia	Luhačovice

16 December - 11:00
16 December - 11:00	Slovakia	12-1	Ukraine	Luhačovice

16 December - 13:00
16 December - 13:00	Czech Republic	3-2	Russia	Luhačovice

== Final standings ==
Final standings
	Czech Republic
	Russia
	Slovakia
4.	Ukraine
5.	Lithuania
