= Paraguay women's national futsal team =

Paraguay
- Nickname(s): Las Albirrojas (The Red and Whites); Las Guaraníes (The Guaranies)
- Association: FIFA: Paraguayan Football Association; AMF: Federación Paraguaya de Fútbol de Salón
- Confederation: FIFA: CONMEBOL (South America); AMF: CSFS, CPFS, CONCACFUTSAL
- FIFA code: PAR
- FIFA ranking: 12 (4 April 2025)

AMF World Cup
- Appearances: 3 (First in 2008)
- Best result: Fourth place, (2017)

Copa América Femenina de Futsal
- Appearances: 5 (First in 2005)
- Best result: Third place, (2011)

The Paraguay women's national futsal team represents Paraguay in international women's futsal competitions. It is overseen by the Paraguayan Football Association (APF) in FIFA competitions and by the Federación Paraguaya de Fútbol de Salón (FPFS) in AMF competitions.

== Competitive record ==
=== Copa América Femenina de Futsal ===
CONMEBOL Copa América Femenina de Futsal record
| Years | Position | Pld | W | D | L | GS | GA |
|---|---|---|---|---|---|---|---|
| (Brazil) 2005 | Sixth place | 2 | 0 | 1 | 1 | 4 | 10 |
| (Ecuador) 2007 | Did not participate | | | | | | |
| (Brazil) 2009 | Did not participate | | | | | | |
| (Venezuela) 2011 | Third place | 5 | 3 | 0 | 2 | 7 | 30 |
| (Uruguay) 2015 | Fifth place | 6 | 3 | 1 | 2 | 24 | 21 |
| (Uruguay) 2017 | Seventh place | 5 | 2 | 1 | 2 | 16 | 16 |
| (Paraguay) 2019 | Fourth place | 6 | 3 | 1 | 2 | 14 | 5 |
| (Argentina) 2023 | TBD | | | | | | |
| Total | 5/7 | 24 | 11 | 4 | 9 | 65 | 82 |

== Honours ==
=== FIFA ===
- South American Women's Futsal Championship:
  - Third place (1): 2011
- South American Games:
  - Champions (1): 2022 Asunción

=== AMF ===
- AMF Futsal Women's World Cup:
  - Fourth place (1): 2017

== See also ==
- Paraguay national futsal team (Men's team)
