= 1985 FIFUSA Futsal World Cup =

1985 II FIFUSA Futsal World Championship
Tournament details
- Host country: Spain
- Dates: 17 – 27 October
- Teams: 12 (from 5 confederations)
- Venue: 1 (in 1 host city)

Final positions
- Champions: Brazil (2nd title)
- Runners-up: Spain
- Third place: Paraguay
- Fourth place: Argentina

Tournament statistics
- Matches played: 26
- Goals scored: 195 (7.5 per match)
- Top scorer: (Paraguay) Ramón Carossini (16 goals)

The 1985 FIFUSA Futsal World Championship was the second edition of the FIFUSA Futsal World Cup (now known as AMF Futsal World Cup). The tournament was held by Spain from 17 to 27 October in Madrid. Twelve national teams from five confederations (four from South America, four from Europe, two from North America, one from Asia and one from Oceania) participated in the tournament.

== Venues ==
All matches were played in one venue: Palacio de Deportes in Madrid.

== Teams ==
- Argentina
- Australia
- Brazil (host nation)
- Canada
- Costa Rica
- Czechoslovakia
- Japan
- Netherlands
- Portugal
- Paraguay
- Spain
- Uruguay

== Ranking ==
Note: As per statistical convention in football, matches decided in extra time are counted as wins and losses, while matches decided by penalty shoot-outs are counted as draws.

Pos.	Team	Pld	W	D	L	Pts	GF	GA	GD
1	Brazil	6	6	0	0	18	48	3	+45
2	Spain	6	5	0	1	15	34	9	+25
3	Paraguay	6	5	0	1	15	35	12	+23
4	Argentina	6	3	0	3	9	23	29	−6
5	Czechoslovakia	5	2	0	3	6	17	21	−4
6	Uruguay	5	2	0	3	6	9	13	−4
7	Portugal	3	1	0	2	3	10	15	−5
8	Australia	3	1	0	2	3	8	15	−7
9	Japan	3	1	0	2	3	4	22	−18
10	Costa Rica	3	0	0	3	0	3	13	−10
11	Canada	3	0	0	3	0	2	18	−16
12	Netherlands	3	0	0	3	0	2	25	−23
