= Futsal =

Variant of football played on a court

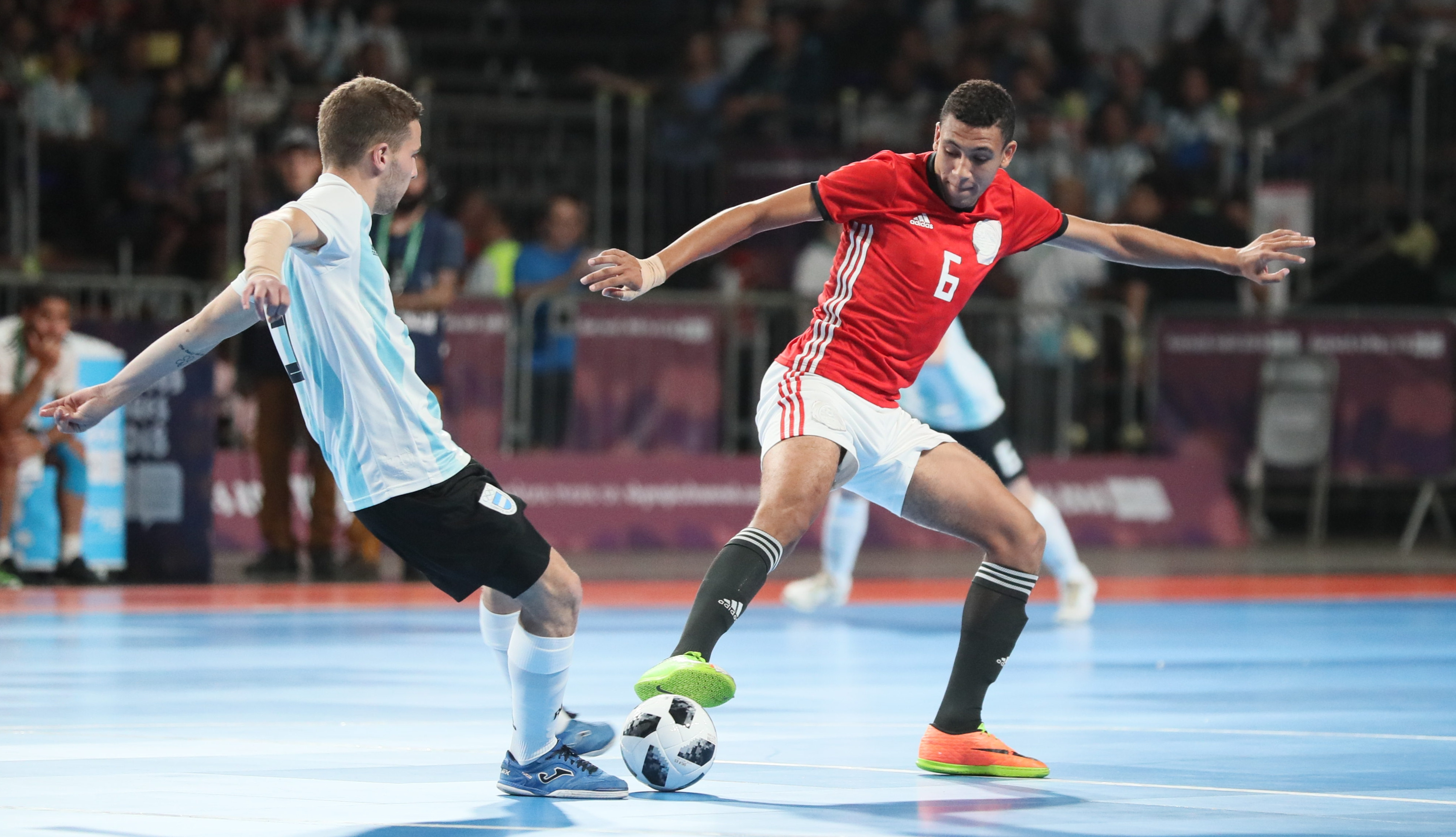
- International futsal match between Argentina and Egypt at the 2018 Summer Youth Olympics
- Highest governing body: FIFA (Note: AMF governs its own version of futsal, distinct from FIFA's, which is not covered in this article.)
- First played: 1930, Montevideo, Uruguay

Characteristics
- Contact: Yes
- Team members: 5 per side
- Mixed-sex: No, separate competitions
- Type: Team sport, ball game
- Equipment: Futsal ball Futsal shoes Shin guards Kits
- Venue: Futsal court

Presence
- Country or region: Worldwide
- Olympic: No (except the Youth Olympics since 2018)
- Paralympic: No

Futsal (/fʊtsɑːl/) is a five-a-side form of association football played between two teams of five players each on a court smaller than a football pitch. Its rules are based on the Laws of the Game of association football, and it also shares similarities with five-a-side football and indoor soccer.

Futsal players, one of whom on each team is the goalkeeper, mainly use their feet to propel a ball around the court with the objective of scoring goals against the opposing team by moving the ball beyond the goal line into the opposing team's goal. A futsal match consists of two periods of 20 minutes, and the team that scores more goals wins; an equal number of goals scored results in a draw. Futsal is played with a smaller and heavier ball than association football, and usually indoors on a hardcourt surface marked by lines.

The playing surface, ball, and rules favour ball control and passing in small spaces. For these reasons, futsal is commonly used by coaches as a means to develop association football players. Futsal is played worldwide, but it is most popular in South America and the Iberian Peninsula, where there are many professional teams. In much of the rest of the world, the sport is primarily amateur or recreational.

== Name ==
Futsal comes from the Portuguese futebol de salão and from the Spanish fútbol sala or fútbol de salón, (Note: Other names for the sport in Spanish include futsala and microfútbol.) all translatable as "indoor football" (lit. 'hall football' or 'room football'). The term may have been coined by a Brazilian journalist in the 1960s. Due to a dispute between FIFA and FIFUSA (now the World Futsal Association) in the 1980s over the use of the word "football", FIFUSA started using the term futsal during its 1985 World Championship in Madrid, Spain. However, FIFA, which started organising its own international futsal tournaments in 1989, also adopted the term in the 1990s. Since then, futsal has become the officially and internationally accepted name.

== History ==
=== Origins ===
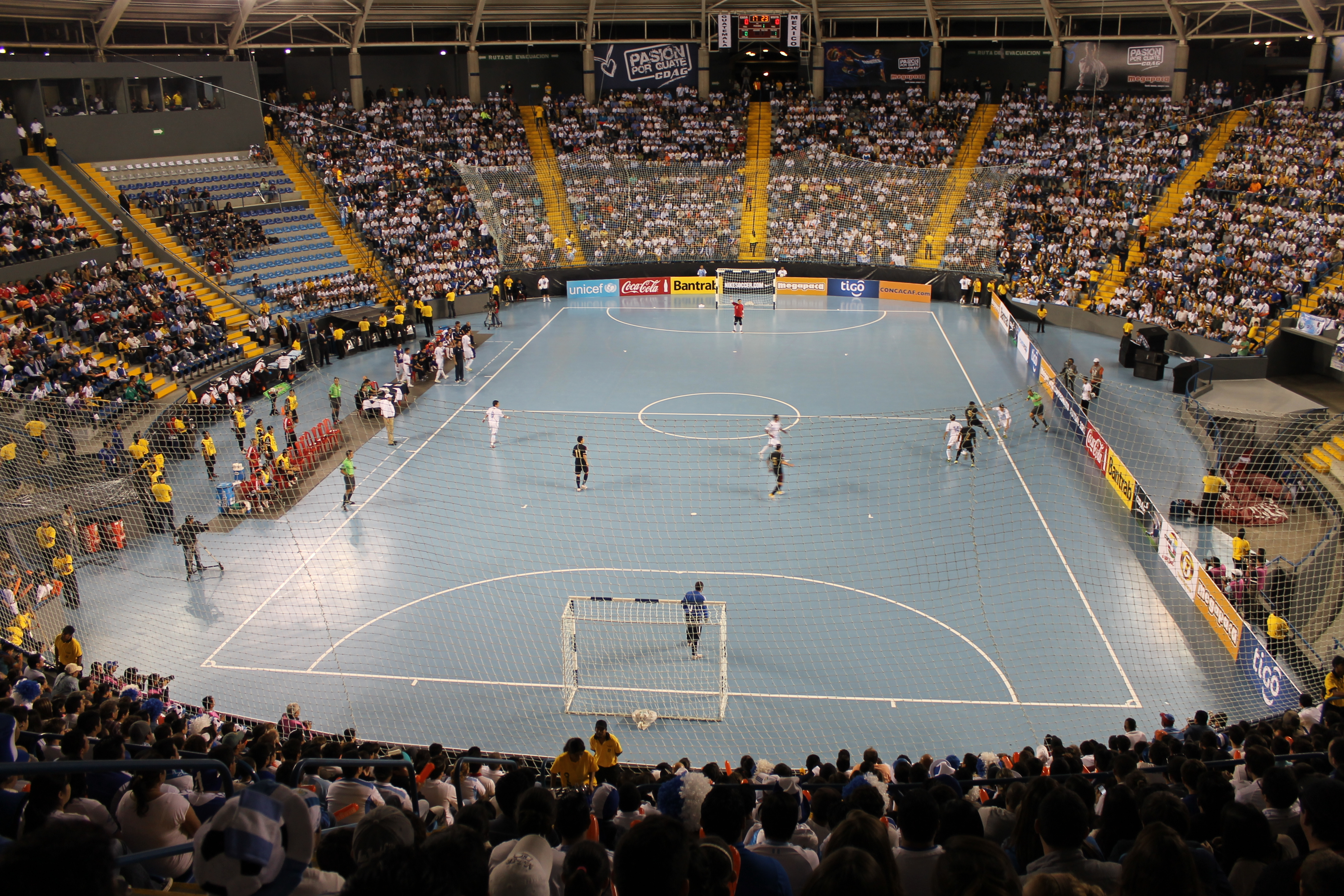
An indoor futsal competition

Futsal started in 1930 in Montevideo, Uruguay, when a physical education teacher named Juan Carlos Ceriani created a version of indoor football for YMCAs.

Originally developed for basketball courts, a rule book for the sport was published in September 1933. Association football was already highly popular in the country, and after Uruguay won gold medals in the 1924 and 1928 Summer Olympics, and the 1930 FIFA World Cup, it attracted even more practitioners. Ceriani's goal was to create a team game similar to football that could be played indoors or outdoors.

While writing the rule book, Ceriani combined the principles of association football—where the ball may be touched with every part of the body except the hands and arms—with rules from other sports: from basketball, the number of players (five per team) and the game's duration (40 active minutes); from water polo, the goalkeeping rules; from hockey, the substitution rules; and from handball, the field and goal sizes.

The YMCA spread the game quickly throughout South America. Futsal was a more accessible and less physically demanding sport than association football that could be played indoors. It even helped players of other sports stay in shape year-round. These reasons convinced João Lotufo, a Brazilian, to bring the game to his country and adapt it to the needs of physical education.

In 1956, the rules were modified by Habib Maphuz and Luiz Gonzaga Fernandes within the YMCA of São Paulo, Brazil, to allow seniors to compete. This YMCA also published, in the same year, a book of the "Brazilian Indoor Football Rules", which was adopted by other South American countries as well.

In 1965, the South American Futsal Confederation was created, consisting of Uruguay, Peru, Paraguay, Brazil and Argentina. Shortly after, a tournament was organised. It attracted interest from South American media, which began to cover futsal regularly. In the 1960s, Brazilian journalist José Antônio Inglêz contributed to the spread of the game, and he may have coined the term "futsal", although it did not come into widespread use until the 1980s.

=== Governance disputes and international growth ===
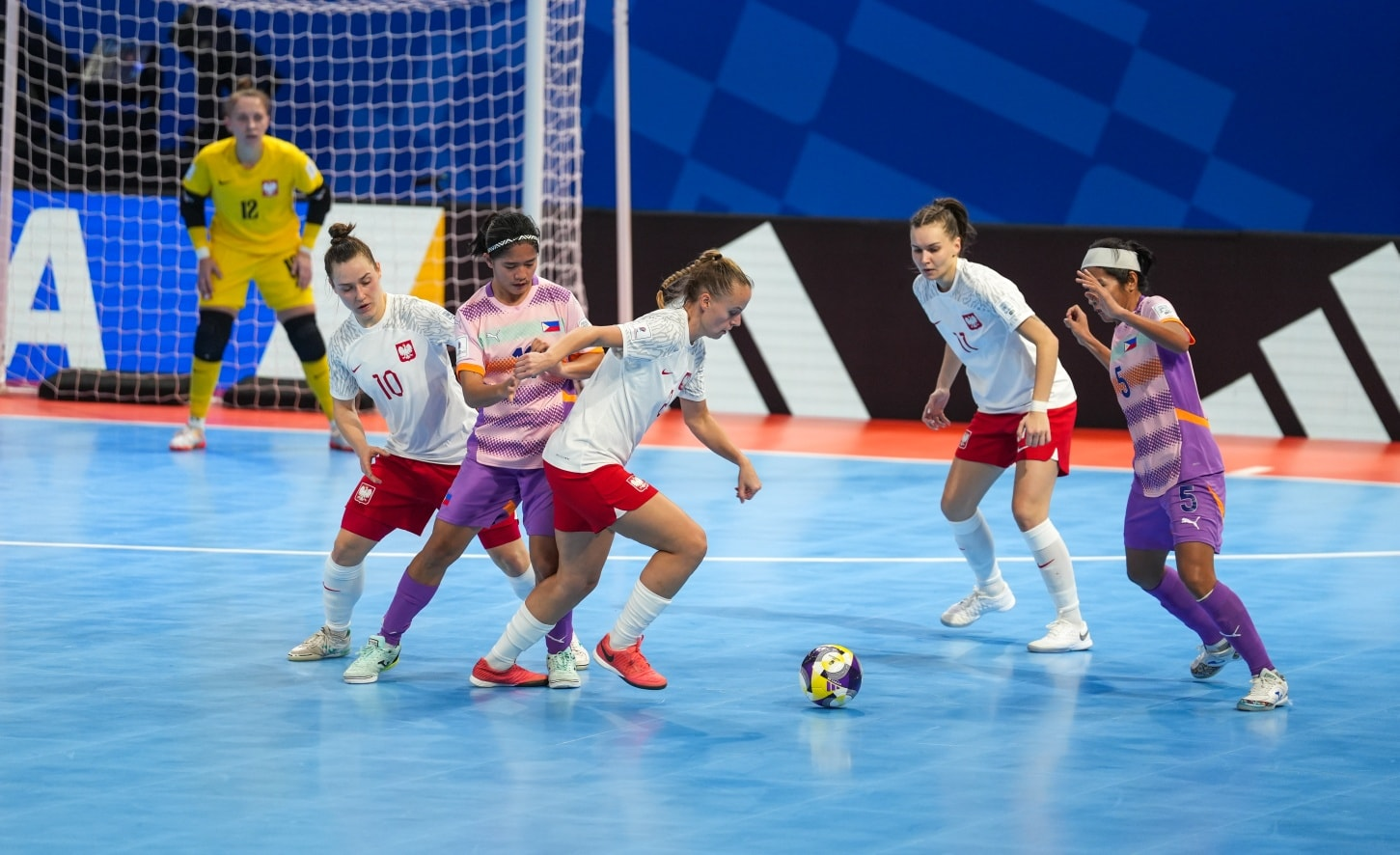
Philippines–Poland match during the first edition of FIFA Women's World Cup in 2025

In 1971, the International Federation of Indoor Football (FIFUSA in both the Portuguese and Spanish abbreviations) was formed, comprising Argentina, Bolivia, Brazil, Paraguay, Peru, Portugal and Uruguay. FIFUSA organised the first Futsal World Championship in 1982 in São Paulo. Shortly after, FIFA took an interest in futsal, but talks between the two organisations to reconcile governance were unsuccessful.

In 1985, FIFUSA organised its second world championship in Madrid, Spain. FIFA tried to prohibit FIFUSA from using the word "football", even in Spanish, in the tournament's title. To date most people in Spain call the game Futbol Sala. The term FUTSAl was first used by then the United States Minisoccer Federation, when its Vice-President (Alex Para) thought that an international name that would not change, regardless of the language should be used. He came out with the term FUTSAL and proposed it to the board of USMF. The board of the U.S. Minisoccer Federation approved the new name since it included in it the word USA. The Federation changed its corporate name in the State of California in 1986 to the United States Futsal Federation. Upon joining FIFA, Alex Para proposed to FIFA President Havelange in 1989 that the name FUTSAL should be used for the FIFA 2nd World Cup, which was being named the 5-a-side FIFA World Cup. For logistical reasons, it was not late, but FIFA started using it in the 3rd. World Cup in Spain in 1996. FIFUSA then resorted to using the term futsal in the, blending futbol and sala. The term, "futsal" has become the sport's most common name.

Since the early 1990s, most national futsal associations have decided to join FIFA, weakening FIFUSA. In late 2002, FIFUSA was reorganised into the World Futsal Association (AMF in the Spanish abbreviation), with its headquarters in Asunción, Paraguay. AMF continues to develop its own version of futsal and to stage its own tournaments in association with affiliated organisations.

The highest-attended futsal match in history took place on 7 September 2014 at the Mané Garrincha Stadium in Brasília, where 56,483 spectators watched Brazil face Argentina in a friendly match.

Futsal is a popular global sport, with over 30 million players worldwide as of 2024, according to FIFA. Due to its easy setup, enhanced accessibility, technical demands, and lower physical requirements, futsal has become an essential resource for coaches aiming to develop football players.

=== Development of women's futsal ===
Before FIFA started organising the women’s world championship, the Women’s Futsal World Tournament was held every year from 2010 to 2015, with Brazil winning all six editions. Players and women’s futsal organisations campaigned for FIFA to set up an official world championship, including through the „#WomenPlayFutsalFIFA“ campaign.

In December 2022, FIFA announced the women's version of the FIFA Futsal World Cup. The inaugural edition was held in the Philippines from 21 November to 7 December 2025, with Brazil winning the title after defeating Portugal 3-0 in the final.

== Gameplay ==
FIFA's version of futsal is played in accordance with the "Futsal Laws of the Game", which are based on IFAB's Laws of the Game, the ruleset for association football. The game is played with a spherical ball of 62–64 cm (24–25 in) circumference. Two teams of five players each compete to get the ball into the other team's goal (between the posts and under the bar), thereby scoring a goal. The team that has scored more goals at the end of the game is the winner; if both teams have scored an equal number of goals then the game is a draw. The primary law is that players other than goalkeepers may not deliberately handle the ball with their hands or arms during play. Although players mostly use their feet to move the ball around, they may use any part of their body other than their hands or arms.

A futsal ball is smaller and heavier than a regular football, with a lower bounce. Consequently, it stays mostly on the ground, which means that "heading" is less common than in association football, and aerial duels are rare. Futsal shares similarities with other small-sided football variants, such as five-a-side football (same number of players) and indoor soccer (similar playing surface). However, unlike those two games, there are no walls or boards around a futsal pitch; instead, boundaries are marked with lines on the floor, as in association football.

During game play, players attempt to create goal-scoring opportunities through individual control of the ball, such as by dribbling, passing the ball to a teammate, and by taking shots at the goal, which is guarded by the opposing goalkeeper. Opposing players may try to regain control of the ball by intercepting a pass or through tackling the opponent in possession of the ball; however, physical contact between opponents is restricted. Futsal is generally a free-flowing game, with play stopping only when the ball has left the field of play or when play is stopped by the referee for an infringement of the rules. After a stoppage, play recommences with a specified restart. There is no offside in futsal.

The Laws of the Game do not specify any player positions other than goalkeeper, but specialised roles have evolved. Usually, besides the goalkeeper, a futsal formation consists of a defender or fixo; two wingers or alas, each of whom mostly occupies the left or right side of the pitch; and a forward or pivot. There are no restrictions in movement, and outfield players can switch positions at any time. The goalkeeper may leave the goal untended and become an additional outfield player in the attacking half of the pitch, called a "flying goalkeeper", particularly in the last minutes of a match, when a team is already losing and is searching for an equaliser. Defining the team's formation and tactics is usually the prerogative of the team's head coach.

Common attacking rotations include the 3–1 and 4–0 systems. In a 3–1 rotation, three outfield players rotate their positions while a fourth stays in an advanced pivot role. In a 4–0 rotation, all four outfield players get involved in the positional movement. These rotations are used to create passing opportunities and space against the opposition's defenders.

Due to the smaller dimensions of the pitch, futsal matches produce more goals on average than association football matches. Futsal is also perceived as being faster-paced than football because of both the pitch dimensions and the unlimited substitutions rule. The playing surface, ball and rules favour ball control and passing in small spaces. Competitive futsal involves repeated high-intensity efforts, including sprints, quick accelerations, decelerations and changes of direction. Systematic reviews have identified significant physiological demands during matches, with some measures of high-intensity performance decreasing between halves. The game also emphasises improvisation, creativity and technique. Futsal is played professionally in a few countries such as Brazil, Portugal and Spain, but it is mostly an amateur or recreational sport in the rest of the world.

== Laws ==
Both international governing bodies (AMF and FIFA) are responsible for maintaining and regulating the official rules of their respective versions of futsal. This section covers the FIFA version of the sport.

FIFA publishes its futsal rules as the "Futsal Laws of the Game", where each of the 17 "laws" is a thematically-related collection of individual regulations. The laws define all aspects of the game, including some that can be changed to suit local competitions and leagues. Many of the laws are similar or identical to those found in association football, or reference association football in their absence (such as a section noting that there is no offside infraction in futsal). Some of the rules require subjective interpretation by the referees.

=== Summary of rules ===
Length of the field
minimum 25 m × 16 m (82 ft × 52 ft), maximum 42 m × 25 m (138 ft × 82 ft).
Ball

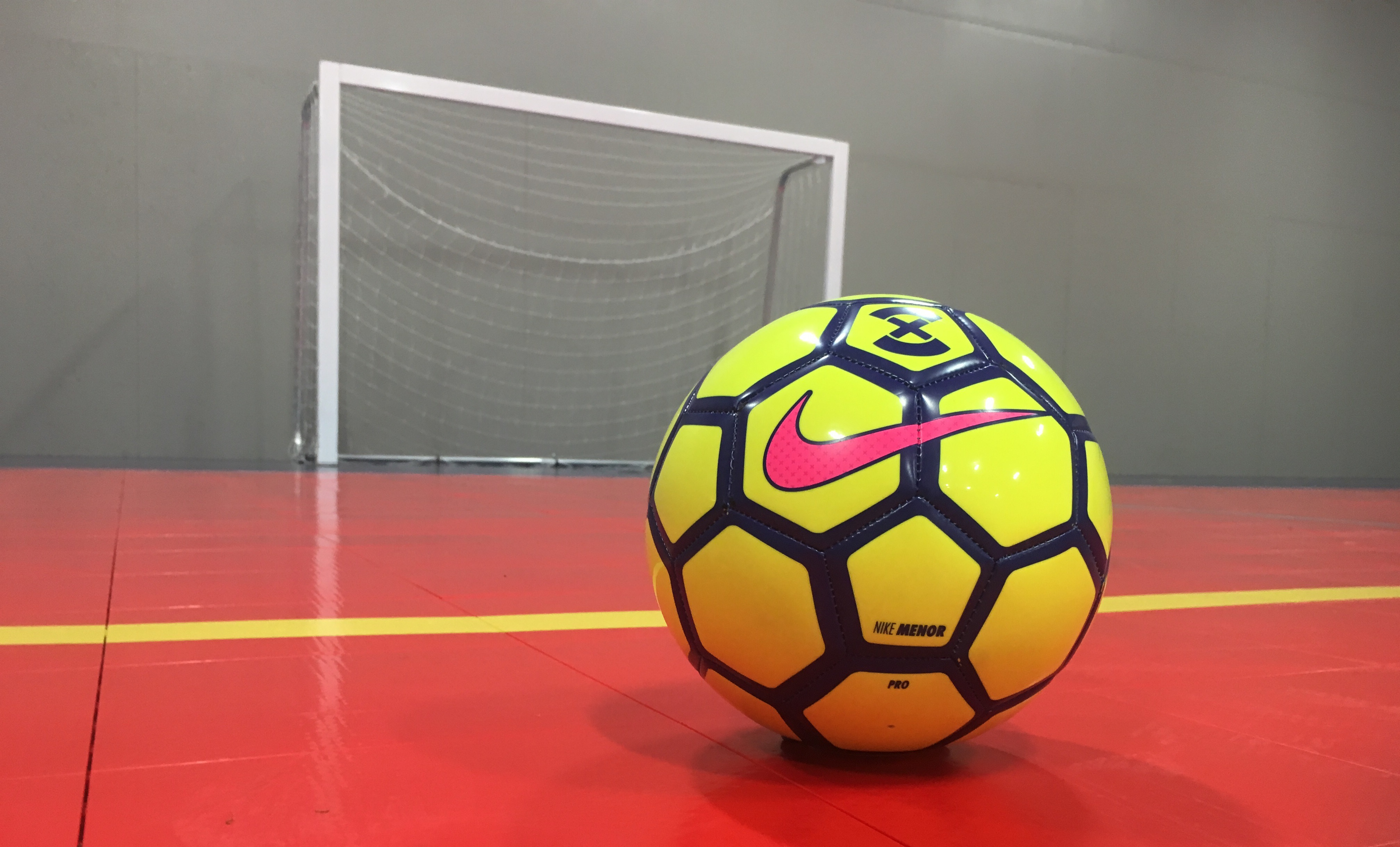
Futsal ball

The ideal futsal ball should weigh 390–490 grams.
Ages 8–12: Size 3, circumference 56–59 cm (22–23 in), weight between 350–380 g (12–13 oz) at the start of the game.
Ages 13 and up: Size 4, circumference 62–64 cm (24–25 in), weight between 400–440 g (14–16 oz) at the start of the game.
Dropped from a height of 2 m (6 ft 7 in), the first rebound must not be lower than 50 cm (20 in) or higher than 65 cm (26 in).
Time
There are two periods of 20 minutes with time stopping at every dead ball situation. Between the two periods there is a break of 15 minutes. Each team may use one timeout per half, which lasts one minute. Some leagues and tournaments use 25 minute periods with running time.
Number of players
There are five players for each team on the field, one of whom must be the goalkeeper, and a maximum number of 9 substitutes that can be used in each match. Substitutions are unlimited and on the fly.
Fouls
A direct free kick is awarded to the opposing team when a player commits actions such as kicking, jumping at, pushing, striking, tripping, holding and spitting at an opponent, and also deliberate handling of the ball. Indirect free kicks, awarded for most infractions that do not involve physical contact with another player, do not count as accumulated fouls. All direct free kicks count as accumulated fouls. Beginning with the sixth accumulated foul in a period, all subsequent fouls result in a direct kick from the second penalty mark (the 10m mark).
Cards
A caution can be shown for unsporting behaviour, dissent, failure to respect the distance on a restart, excessive delay of a restart, persistent infringement, or incorrectly entering/leaving the field of play. A player or substitute can be sent off for serious foul play, violent conduct, spitting, illegally denying an obvious goal-scoring opportunity, abusive language, and receiving a second caution. Sent-off players are ejected from the game and their team must play short for two minutes or until the other team scores a goal.
Free kicks
Taken from the spot of the infringement or on the line of the penalty area nearest to the infringement (indirect only). All opponents must be at least 5 m (16 ft) away from the ball. The kick must be taken within four seconds or an indirect kick is awarded to the other team.
Kick from the second penalty mark (10m mark)
Awarded when a team commits 6 or more accumulated fouls in a period. The second penalty mark is 10 m (33 ft) from the goal. During the kick, opponents must be behind the ball, and the goalkeeper must be at least 5 m (16 ft) away from the ball.
Penalty kick
6 m (20 ft) from the centre of the goal for fouls inside the 6 m (20 ft) goalkeeper's area.
Goalkeeper
When in possession of the ball, the goalkeeper has 4 seconds to get rid of the ball. If the ball is kept for too long, the referee will give an indirect free kick to the other team. The goalkeeper may play freely when in the opponent's half.
Goalkeeper pass-back restriction
Once the goalkeeper has released the ball either by kicking or throwing, the goalkeeper may not touch it again until the ball goes out of play or is touched by an opponent. The sanction for violation is an indirect free kick. The goalkeeper may receive the ball freely when on the opponent's half.
Kick-in
A kick-in is used instead of a throw-in. The player must place the ball on the touchline or outside but not more than 25 cm (9.8 in) from the place the ball went out of play. The ball must be stationary, and the kick-in must be taken within 4 seconds from the time the player is ready. During the kick-in, opponents must stand at least 5 m (16 ft) from the ball. If four seconds elapse or an illegal kick is taken, the referee will award a kick-in to the other team. It is not allowed to score directly from a kick-in: the goal is valid only if someone else touches the ball before it enters the goal.
Goal clearance
A goal clearance is used instead of a goal kick. The goalkeeper must throw or release the ball with their hands from the penalty area. If four seconds elapse without the ball being released, the other team gets an indirect free kick on the line of the penalty area. A goal cannot be scored directly from a goal clearance.
Corner kick
The ball must be placed inside the arc nearest to the point where the ball crossed the goal line and the opponents must stand on the pitch at least 5 m (16 ft) away from the corner arc until the ball is in play. The corner kick must be taken within 4 seconds of being ready otherwise a goal clearance will be awarded to the other team. As with any other restart that involves a kick, the ball is in play when it is kicked and clearly moves.
Referees
For international matches, there must be two referees: one (first referee) is positioned on the touchline near the timekeeper table and communicates with the timekeeper, while the other (second referee) is in the opposite side of the field. At the timekeeper table there is a timekeeper and a third referee, who controls the teams' benches. In minor events, the third referee and the timekeeper may not be used.

=== Players, equipment and officials ===
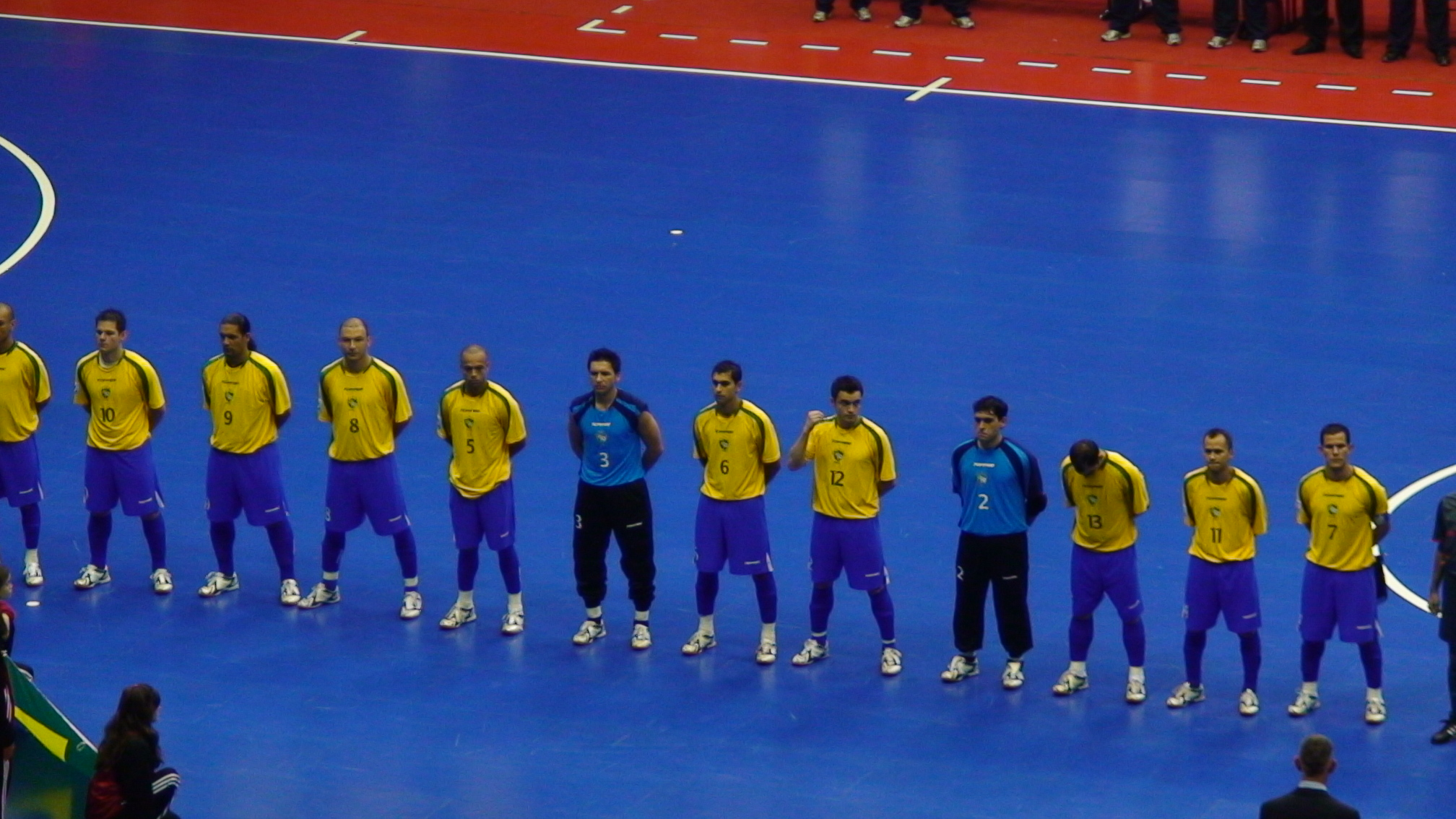
The Brazil national futsal team line up before a match.

There are five players on the field on each team, one of whom is the goalkeeper. The maximum number of substitutes allowed is nine, with unlimited substitutions during the match. Substitutes can come on even when the ball is in play, but the player coming off must leave the playing field first before the substitute can enter it. If a team has or is reduced to fewer than three players, the match is abandoned and counted as a loss for the team with the lack of players.

The kit is made up of a jersey or shirt with sleeves, shorts, socks, shin guards made out of metal, plastic or foam, and shoes with rubber soles. The goalkeepers are allowed to wear long trousers and must wear different coloured kits to distinguish themselves from the other players on the pitch and the referees. All players are allowed to wear "non-dangerous protective equipment" such as gloves, soft headgear, knee and arm pads. Jewellery is not allowed, nor are other items that could be dangerous to the player wearing the item or to other participants.

The match is controlled by the referee, who enforces the Laws of the Game, and the first referee is the only one who can legally abandon the match because of interference from outside the field. This referee is assisted by a second referee who typically watches over the goal lines or assists the primary referee with calls on fouls or plays. The decisions made by the referees are final and can only be changed if the referees think it is necessary and play has not restarted. There is also a third referee and a timekeeper (both are required for international matches, but may be absent in other events) who are provided with equipment to keep a record of fouls in the match. In the event of injury to the second referee, the third referee will replace the second referee.

Video Support (VS) was introduced at the FIFA Futsal World Cup in 2021. Futsal’s system lets teams request reviews of decisions. Categories include goals, penalties, direct red cards and mistaken identity. Match referees review footage and make the final decision.

=== The pitch ===
A futsal pitch

The futsal pitch is made up of wood or artificial material, or similar surface, although any flat, smooth and non-abrasive material may be used. The length of the field is in the range of 38–42 m (125–138 ft), and the width is in the range of 20–25 m (66–82 ft) for international matches. For other matches, it can be 25–42 m (82–138 ft) in length, while the width can be 16–25 m (52–82 ft), as long as the length of the longer boundary lines (touchlines) are greater than the shorter boundaries where the goals are placed (goal lines). Any standard handball field can be used for futsal, including the goals, but futsal-specific floor markings need to be added. Basketball courts of 28 m × 15 m (92 ft × 49 ft) can also be used for informal futsal. The standard size court for an international match is 40 m × 20 m (131 ft × 66 ft) (the size of a handball field). The minimum height of the ceiling is defined by the competition rules.

A rectangular goal is positioned at the middle of each goal line. The inner edges of the vertical goalposts must be 3 m (9.8 ft) apart, and the lower edge of the horizontal crossbar supported by the goalposts must be 2 m (6.6 ft) above the ground. Nets made of hemp, jute or nylon are attached to the back of the goalposts and crossbar. The lower part of the nets is attached to curved tubing or another suitable means of support. The depth of the goal is 80 cm (31 in) at the top and 1 m (3.3 ft) at the bottom.

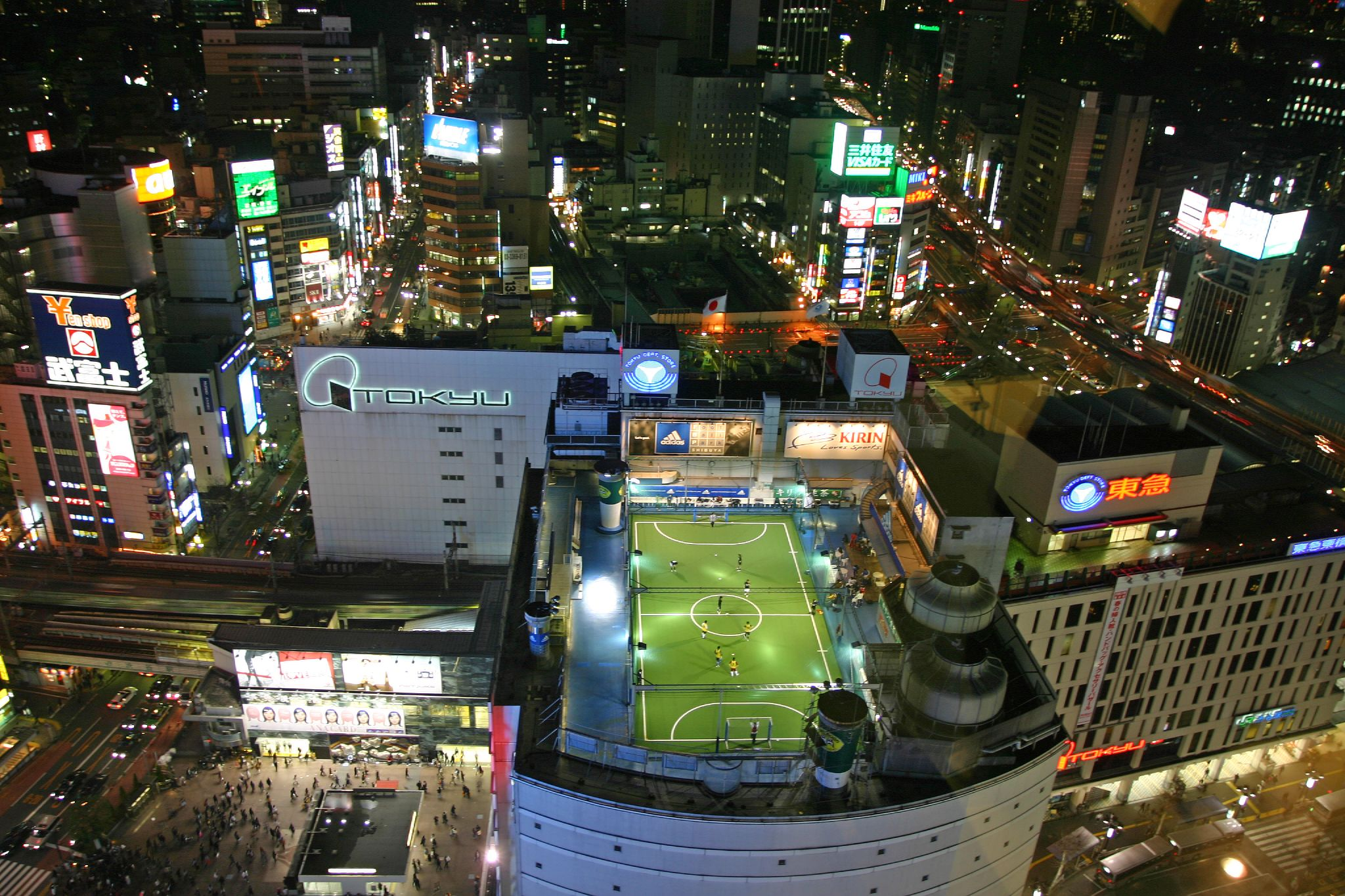
A futsal arena in Tokyo

In front of each goal is an area known as the penalty area. This area is created by drawing quarter-circles with a 6 m (20 ft) radius from the goal line, centred on the goalposts. The upper part of each quarter-circle is then joined by a 3.16 m (10.4 ft) line running parallel to the goal line between the goalposts. The line marking the edge of the penalty area is known as the penalty-area line. The penalty area marks where the goalkeeper is allowed to touch the ball with their hands. The penalty mark is six metres from the goal line when it reaches the middle of the goalposts. The second penalty mark is 10 metres (33 ft) from the goal line when it reaches the middle of the goalposts. A penalty kick from the penalty spot is awarded if a player commits a foul inside the penalty area. The second penalty spot is used for a direct free kick awarded to the opposing team when a player commits their team's sixth or any subsequent fouls in a period.

=== Duration and tie-breaking methods ===
A standard match consists of two equal periods of 20 minutes. The length of either half is extended to allow penalty kicks to be taken or a direct free kick to be taken against a team that has committed more than five fouls. The interval between the two halves cannot exceed 15 minutes. Each team is permitted to use one timeout per period, lasting one minute. The 2020 changes made it so that the timekeeper's signal, not the referee's whistle, is the signal that a period has ended, as long as the rules about finishing certain kicks are being followed.

In some competitions, a match cannot end in a draw. The away-goals rule, extra time and penalties (penalty shoot-out) are the only three methods that can be used to determine the winner after a match has been drawn. Away goals mean that if the aggregate score is level after each team has played one home and one away game, then the team that scored more away goals is declared the winner. Extra time consists of two periods of five minutes. If no winner is produced after these two methods, five kicks from the penalty mark are taken alternately by the two teams, and the team that has scored the most wins. If it is not decided after five kicks, it continues to go on with one extra kick from the penalty mark to each team at a time until one of them has scored more goals than the other. Unlike extra time, the goals scored in a shoot-out do not count towards the goals scored throughout the match.

=== The start and restart of play ===
At the beginning of the match, a coin toss is used to decide who will start the match. A kick-off is used to signal the start of play and is used at the start of the second half and any periods of extra time. It is also used after a goal has been scored, with the team that conceded the goal restarting the play. After a temporary stoppage for any reason not mentioned in the Laws of the Game, the referee will drop the ball where the play was stopped, provided that, before the stoppage, the ball was in play and had not crossed either the touchlines or goal lines. Under 2020 rule changes, you can score directly from a kick-off into the opposition’s goal, but not from a kick-off as an own goal.

If the ball goes completely over the goal line or touchline, hits the ceiling, or play is stopped by the referee, the ball is out of play. When the ball goes over the touchline, play is restarted with a kick-in to the opponents of the team that last touched it, taken from the touchline at the point where the ball left the pitch. If it hits the ceiling of an indoor arena, play is also restarted with a kick-in to the opponents of the team that last touched the ball, under the place nearest to where it hit the ceiling.

When the ball goes over the goal line and a goal is not scored, if it was last touched by an attacking player, play is restarted with a goal clearance taken by the goalkeeper, who must use their hands to throw or release the ball from the penalty area. If the ball was last touched by a defending player, play is restarted with a corner kick to the opposing team, taken from the corner arc nearest to where the ball left the pitch.

Excluding a dropped ball, in all these situations, the ball is in play as soon as it is kicked (thrown or released in a goal clearance) and clearly moves; the player who puts the ball into play cannot touch it again before it touches another player; and play must be restarted "within four seconds of the team being ready to put the ball into play". Goals cannot be scored directly from a kick-in or a goal clearance. The ball must be stationary before every restart that involves a kick, including free kicks.

=== Lack of offside rule ===
Unlike in association football, the offside rule does not apply in futsal. In the Futsal Laws of the Game, Law 11 references offside as it does in the association football laws, but only to say that "there is no offside in futsal".

=== Misconduct ===
Players are cautioned with a yellow card and sent off with a red card.

A direct free kick can be awarded to the opposing team if a player succeeds or attempts to kick or trip an opponent, holds, jumps at, charges or pushes an opponent, or strikes or attempts to strike an opponent. Biting or spitting at an opponent are also offences that result in a direct free kick (as well as a red card for the offender), as are striking the ball with an object and handling the ball in most circumstances (except a goalkeeper inside their own penalty area). These are all accumulated fouls. After five accumulated fouls in a half, the sixth accumulated foul and beyond result in a direct kick from the second penalty mark, and opponents cannot form a "wall" to defend the kick.

The direct free kick is taken where the infringement occurred, unless it is awarded to the defending team in their penalty area, in which case the free kick may be taken from anywhere inside that area. A penalty kick is awarded to the opposing team if a player commits one of the fouls that are punishable by a direct free kick inside their own penalty area. The position of the ball at the moment that the foul occurs does not matter as long as it is in play.

An indirect free kick is awarded to the opposing team if a goalkeeper releases the ball and then touches it again with their hands before another player has touched it, if the goalkeeper handles the ball after it has been kicked to them by a team-mate, if the goalkeeper receives a pass from a team-mate in their own half for a second time before it has touched an opponent, or if they touch or control the ball with hands, arms or feet in their own half for more than four seconds.

An indirect free kick is also awarded to the opposing team if someone plays in a dangerous manner, deliberately obstructs an opponent, prevents the goalkeeper from throwing the ball with their hands, or if anything else happens for which play must be stopped to caution or dismiss a player. The indirect free kick is taken from the place where the infringement occurred, unless it occurred inside of the penalty area, in which case it is taken from anywhere in that area if the foul was committed by the attacking team, or from the penalty-area line if it was committed by the defending team. A goal may not be scored from an indirect free kick without the ball touching another player.

Yellow and red cards are used in futsal. The yellow card is used to caution players over their actions. If a player is shown two yellow cards in the same match, they are then shown a red card, which means that they are sent off the field. A yellow card is shown to a player who displays unsporting behaviour, dissent, and persistent infringement of the Laws of the Game, or delays the restart of play, fails to respect the distances from the ball when play is being restarted, infringes the substitution procedure or enters, re-enters and leaves the field without the referees' permission.

A player is shown a red card directly (without receiving a second yellow) and sent off if they engage in serious foul play, violent conduct, or spit at another person. Other actions punishable by a red card include denying the opposing team a goal or an obvious goalscoring opportunity by committing certain direct-free-kick fouls, such as by handling the ball (except a goalkeeper inside their own penalty area), and using offensive, insulting or abusive language or gestures. A player who has been sent off must leave the vicinity of the pitch.

A substitute is permitted to come on two minutes after a team-mate has been sent off, unless a goal is scored before the end of the two minutes. If the team with more players scores against the team with fewer players, then a substitute can replace the sent-off player immediately. If the teams are equal when the goal is scored or if the team with fewer players scores, both teams remain with the same number of players until the two minutes have elapsed.

== Governing bodies ==
The two most important international governing bodies of futsal are the Asociación Mundial de Futsal (AMF) and the Fédération Internationale de Football Association (FIFA). AMF, formed in 2002, is the successor organisation to the original governing body, FIFUSA, which was founded in 1971. FIFA became interested in futsal in the 1980s, but talks between FIFA and AMF to reconcile governance were not successful, and they organise their own separate competitions.

The FIFA headquarters are located in Zürich, Switzerland. Six regional confederations are associated with FIFA; these are:

- Asia: Asian Football Confederation (AFC)
- Africa: Confederation of African Football (CAF)
- Europe: Union of European Football Associations (UEFA)
- North/Central America & Caribbean: Confederation of North, Central American and Caribbean Association Football (CONCACAF)
- Oceania: Oceania Football Confederation (OFC)
- South America: Confederación Sudamericana de Fútbol (South American Football Confederation; CONMEBOL)

The International Futsal Alliance (IFA) is a partnership of countries formed to offer high quality futsal tournaments throughout the world. It sees itself as ancillary rather than competing with FIFA. Its membership spans countries from North and South America, Europe, Africa, Asia, and Oceania. Several tournaments have been organised under the auspices of IFA, including a World Cup for men held in 2019 and one for women held in 2017.

National football associations or federations are responsible for managing futsal in their own countries both professionally and at an amateur level, and for coordinating competitions in accordance with the Futsal Laws of the Game.

== International competitions ==
=== National team competitions ===
==== Men ====
Region	AMF-affiliated	FIFA-affiliated	Other competitions
World	AMF Futsal World Cup	FIFA Futsal World Cup	Arab Futsal Cup; Futsal Confederations Cup; Futsal Mundialito; Grand Prix de Futsal; World Deaf Football Championships; World University Futsal Championships
Asia		AFC Futsal Asian Cup	Asian Indoor and Martial Arts Games; Southeast Asian Games; SAFF Futsal Championship; ASEAN Futsal Championship; CAFA Futsal Championship; EAFF Futsal Championship; WAFF Futsal Championship
Africa		Futsal Africa Cup of Nations	
North America, Central America and Caribbean		CONCACAF Futsal Championship	Central American Games
South America		Copa América de Futsal	Odesur Games; Bolivarian Games
Oceania		OFC Futsal Nations Cup	
Europe	UEFS Futsal Men's Championship	UEFA Futsal Championship	Baltic Futsal Cup; European Universities Football Championships; Nordic Futsal Cup

==== Women ====
Region	AMF-affiliated	FIFA-affiliated	Other competitions
World	AMF Futsal Women's World Cup	FIFA Futsal Women's World Cup	World Deaf Football Championships; World University Futsal Championships
Asia		AFC Women's Futsal Asian Cup	Asian Indoor and Martial Arts Games; Southeast Asian Games; SAFF Women's Futsal Championship; ASEAN Women's Futsal Championship; CAFA Women's Futsal Championship; WAFF Women's Futsal Championship
Africa		Women's Futsal Africa Cup of Nations	
North America, Central America and Caribbean		CONCACAF W Futsal Championship	
South America		Copa América de Futsal Femenina	
Oceania		OFC Futsal Women's Nations Cup	
Europe	UEFS Futsal Women's Championship	UEFA Women's Futsal Championship	European Universities Football Championships

=== Club competitions ===
Region	AMF-affiliated men's competitions	AMF-affiliated women's competitions	FIFA-affiliated men's competitions	FIFA-affiliated women's competitions	Other competitions
World	AMF Club World Cup		Intercontinental Futsal Cup		Futsal 5 A-Side Australia Interstate Club Championship
South America			Copa Libertadores de Futsal	Copa Libertadores Femenina de Futsal	
Asia			AFC Futsal Club Championship AFF Futsal Club Championship		
Africa					
North America, Central America and Caribbean			CONCACAF Futsal Club Championship		TSC Futsal League
Oceania			OFC Futsal Champions League		
Europe	UEFS European Champions Cup; UEFS Cup; UEFS Veteran European Champions Cup	UEFS Women's European Champions Cup; UEFS Women's Cup	UEFA Futsal Champions League		

=== Discontinued competitions ===
- Futsal at the Lusophony Games
- Futsal at the Pan American Games
- Mediterranean Futsal Cup
- North African Futsal Tournament
- Women's Futsal World Tournament

== FIFA Futsal World Ranking ==
On 6 May 2024, FIFA officially launched the FIFA Futsal World Ranking for both men's and women's national teams, citing the exponential growth of futsal worldwide. The rankings are used for seeding in the FIFA Futsal World Cup. In the inaugural release, Brazil was placed first in both the men's and women's rankings.

=== Men ===
The top 20 teams according to the FIFA Futsal Men's World Ranking are:

Top 20 rankings as of 24 September 2026
Rank	Change	Team	Points
1	Steady	Brazil	1684.97
2	Steady	Portugal	1575.32
3	Steady	Spain	1574.39
4	Steady	Argentina	1513.38
5	Steady	Iran	1507.71
6	Steady	Morocco	1497.3
7	Steady	Russia	1428.98
8	Steady	Kazakhstan	1403.8
9	Steady	Ukraine	1400.89
10	Steady	France	1397.25
11	Steady	Thailand	1352.07
12	Steady	Japan	1315.11
13	Steady	Croatia	1312.03
14	Steady	Indonesia	1269.82
15	▲1	Venezuela	1254.82
16	▼1	Armenia	1253.26
17	Steady	Italy	1249.47
18	Steady	Paraguay	1236.37
19	Steady	Czech Republic	1212.71
20	▲2	Vietnam	1210.93
*Change from 8 May 2026
Complete rankings at FIFA.com

=== Women ===
The top 20 teams according to the FIFA Futsal Women's World Ranking are:

Top 20 rankings as of 24 September 2026
Rank	Change	Team	Points
1	Steady	Brazil	1514.38
2	Steady	Spain	1416.52
3	Steady	Portugal	1381.32
4	Steady	Argentina	1268.75
5	Steady	Italy	1242.66
6	Steady	Japan	1214.13
7	Steady	Thailand	1205.45
8	Steady	Colombia	1204.96
9	Steady	Russia	1165.1
10	Steady	Iran	1161.08
11	Steady	Vietnam	1142.22
12	Steady	Paraguay	1110.61
13	Steady	Uruguay	1078.24
14	Steady	Ukraine	1078.03
15	Steady	Chinese Taipei	1063.38
16	Steady	China	1063.06
17	Steady	Finland	1058.35
18	Steady	Sweden	1044.36
19	▲1	Netherlands	1041.57
20	▼1	Poland	1034.23
*Change from 8 May 2026
Complete rankings at FIFA.com

== See also ==
- Beach soccer
- List of types of football
- Street football
