= FIFA International Match Calendar =

Association football scheduling agreement

The FIFA International Match Calendar (sometimes abbreviated as the FIFA Calendar) is an outline agreement between FIFA, the six continental association football confederations, the European Club Association, and FIFPro, which sets out which dates can be used for "official" and "friendly" international matches. Individual periods of these dates are commonly referred to as "international breaks". FIFA insists that official and friendly matches within designated breaks take precedence over domestic matches, so clubs are required to release players to go play with their national teams, while international friendlies that take place outside the designated dates do not take precedence, and clubs may retain players.

The current dates are within five windows: in March, June, July, September–October, and November (men) and February–March, April, June, October, and November–December (women). The match calendar also determines when international competitions such as the FIFA World Cup, Summer Olympics, AFC Asian Cup, Africa Cup of Nations, Copa América, CONCACAF Gold Cup, OFC Nations Cup, and UEFA European Championship can take place. These competitions, which can last for several weeks, often occur during the summer (June–July) break when most club leagues are not playing. But these competitions can occur at other times of year as well, in which case they sometimes conflict with club games and cause players to be absent from their clubs; typically such breaks apply only to specific continental competitions rather than all national teams worldwide, so outside that continent, relatively few players are absent from any one club.

Official matches have a release period of four days, which means that players can take up to four days away from club duties to partake in national team duties. Because most breaks include 2–3 games, players take at least 8–12 days away from their clubs. If a player participates in an official match on a different continent from their club's, the release period is five days. Friendly matches are deemed less important and the release period is 48 hours.

The calendar was first used during the 2006 FIFA World Cup qualification.

== Upcoming match windows ==
=== Men's International Match Calendar ===
Dates	Matches or tournaments
22–30 March 2027	2
7–15 June 2027	2
19 June – 11 July 2027	2027 CONCACAF Gold Cup
19 June – 17 July 2027	2027 Africa Cup of Nations
20 September – 5 October 2027	4
8–16 November 2027	2
23 December 2027 – 21 January 2028	2027 AFC Asian Cup (Note: Originally to be held from 7 January to 5 Februaruy 2027, but were postponed due to "exceptional circumstances arising from developments in Saudi Arabia".)
20–28 March 2028	2
29 May – 6 June 2028	2
June – July 2028	2028 Africa Cup of Nations (Note: May be pushed back to December 2028 – January 2029 depending on host selection)
June – July 2028	2028 Copa América
June – July 2028	2028 OFC Men's Nations Cup
June – July 2028	UEFA Euro 2028
18 September – 3 October 2028	4
13–21 November 2028	2
19–27 March 2029	2
4–12 June 2029	2
June – July 2029	2029 CONCACAF Gold Cup
24 September – 9 October 2029	4
12–20 November 2029	2
18–26 March 2030	2
3–11 June 2030	2 (Note: Reserved for friendlies in preparation for the subsequent FIFA World Cup)
June – July 2030	2030 FIFA World Cup
23 September – 8 October 2030	4
11–19 November 2030	2

=== Women's International Match Calendar ===
Starting in 2026, there are two types of breaks, I and II. Players are released to national associations either from Monday of one week to Tuesday night of the following week (Type I, up to two matches) or from Tuesday of one week to Saturday night of the following week (Type II, up to three matches). Prior to that in 2025, players were released to national associations from Monday to either Tuesday night (Type I), Wednesday night (Type II), or Saturday night (Type III) of the following week.

Dates	Window type	Number of matches
24 November – 5 December 2026	Type II	3
23 February – 6 March 2027	Type II	3
13–24 April 2027	Type II	3
7–15 June 2027	Type I	2
24 June – 25 July 2027	2027 FIFA Women's World Cup	
4–12 October 2027	Type I	2
23 November – 4 December 2027	Type II	3
21 February – 2 April 2028	Blocked period (Note: Final competition of the championships for women’s "A" representative teams of the confederations (including release period)) (except UEFA)	
22 February – 4 March 2028	Type II	3
4–15 April 2028	Type II	3
29 May – 6 June 2028	Type I	2
10–30 July 2028	Women's Olympic Football Tournament	
2–10 October 2028	Type I	2
21 November – 2 December 2028	Type II	3
22 January – 4 March 2029	Blocked period (except UEFA)	
20 February – 3 March 2029	Type II	3
10–21 April 2029	Type II	3
June 2029	Type I	2
4 June – 29 July 2029	Blocked period	
15–23 October 2029	Type I	2
27 November – 8 December 2029	Type II	3
