= 2028 Copa América =

49th edition of the Copa América

CONMEBOL Copa América 2028

Tournament details
- Host country: TBA
- Dates: June – July 2028
- Teams: TBA
- Venue: TBA (in TBA host cities)

The 2028 Copa América will be the 49th edition of the Copa América, the primary football competition between the national teams of South America. The competition, organized by CONMEBOL, is the oldest continental football tournament still running today. Argentina are the two-time defending champions, having won their record 16th title in 2024.

== Host selection ==
The host for the 2028 Copa América has yet to be announced. Potential candidates include:

=== Ecuador ===
In accordance with the current host rotation system, Ecuador — which last hosted the tournament in 1993 — would be next in line to organize the event. In late February 2024, during a meeting between CONMEBOL president Alejandro Domínguez and government of President Daniel Noboa, Noboa expressed interest in organizing the tournament. However, on 21 June 2026, Brazilian newspaper O Estado de S. Paulo reported that the Ecuadorian bid has some doubts due to concerns over infrastructure and security.

As part of the proposal, the Ecuadorian government nominated eight cities to host matches and accommodate the participating teams: Quito, Guayaquil, Manta, Cuenca, Machala, Ambato, Riobamba and Salinas.

=== United States ===
According to the Brazilian newspaper O Globo, there is reportedly a prior agreement between CONMEBOL and the United States Soccer Federation for the United States to host the tournament in both 2024 and 2028.

On 1 December 2025, The Athletic reported that CONMEBOL and CONCACAF were in deep discussions to host the tournament in the United States. It would be the third time in five editions that the United States would host, having hosted the previous edition in 2024 and Copa América Centenario in 2016. Later, on 21 June 2026, it was reported that the two confederations had met in Miami and were accelerating an agreement for the tournament to be hosted in the United States. However, the tournament dates would have to be adjusted due to the 2028 Summer Olympics being held in Los Angeles. On 20 November, it was widely reported that COMENBOL president Alejandro Domínguez had informed federation representatives that the tournement was set to be hosted in the United States.

=== Uruguay ===
It has been speculated that Uruguay, potentially in conjunction with Argentina and Paraguay, could host the tournament as a test run of its infrastructure ahead of the centennial 2030 FIFA World Cup. On 7 December 2023, El País published an interview with Ignacio Alonso, president of the Uruguayan Football Association, who denied that any official steps toward hosting had been taken.

== Teams ==
All 10 CONMEBOL national teams are eligible to enter alongside potential guests:

- Argentina
- Bolivia
- Brazil
- Chile
- Colombia
- Ecuador
- Paraguay
- Peru
- Uruguay
- Venezuela

== See also ==
- UEFA Euro 2028
- Finalissima
- 2028 Summer Olympics
