= Ignacio Alonso =

Uruguayan administrator

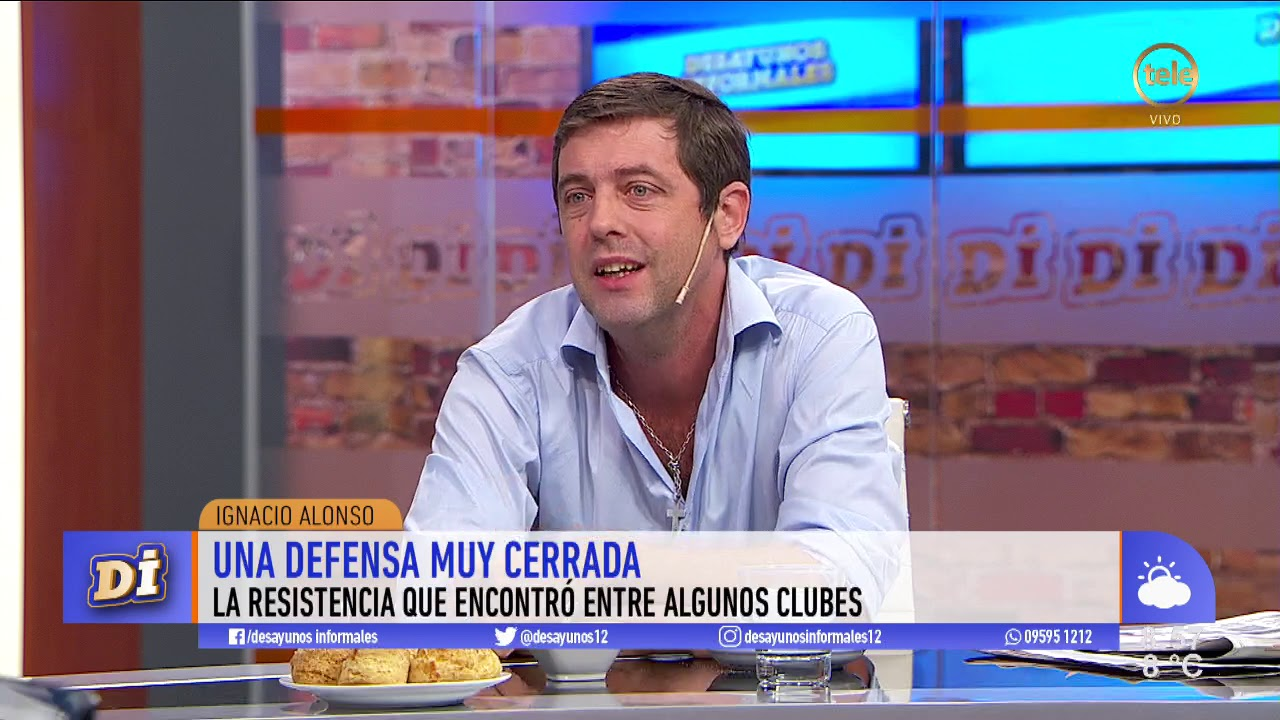
- Alonso in 2019
- Born: Ignacio Alonso Labat; 2 August 1978 (age 48); Montevideo, Uruguay
- Occupations: Member, FIFA Council

Ignacio Alonso Labat (born 2 August 1978), is a Uruguayan sports administrator and economist who is the president of the Uruguayan Football Association and the member of the FIFA Council since 2019.

== Biography ==
Ignacio Alonso was born in Montevideo on 2 August 1978.

He graduated as an economist from the University of the Republic. He worked as an agricultural producer.

His activity at the level of sports leadership begins in Rampla Juniors, the club he supports, where he is a member of the Heritage Commission. He later joined the Executive Board of the AUF during the presidency of Sebastián Bauzá; and by Wilmar Valdez.

He also had a brief walk through politics, as a sports advisor to candidate Luis Lacalle Pou in 2014.

In February 2019, Alonso announced his candidacy for the presidency of the Uruguayan Football Association, a position for which he is officially elected the following month. He plans to lead an organization in a "re-founding" period with the entry into force of a new statute. He is also elected to the FIFA Council in 2019.

He is the second youngest president to assume this position after the record held by Héctor Rivadavia Gómez, who took office in 1907 when he was only 27 years old.
