= UEFA Jubilee Awards =

Sports award

To celebrate the Union of European Football Associations (UEFA)'s 50th anniversary in 2004, each of its member associations was asked by UEFA to choose one of its own players as the single most outstanding player of the past 50 years (1954–2003).

== Award winners ==
The 52 players were known as the Golden Players. The list of players was released in November 2003, and they were recognized at UEFA's headquarters in Nyon. Players active at the time of announcement are marked by (*).

- Albania – Panajot Pano
- Andorra – Koldo*
- Armenia – Khoren Oganesian
- Austria – Herbert Prohaska
- Azerbaijan – Anatoliy Banishevskiy
- Belarus – Sergei Aleinikov
- Belgium – Paul Van Himst
- Bosnia and Herzegovina – Safet Sušić
- Bulgaria – Hristo Stoichkov
- Croatia – Davor Šuker
- Cyprus – Sotiris Kaiafas
- Czech Republic – Josef Masopust
- Denmark – Michael Laudrup
- England – Bobby Moore
- Estonia – Mart Poom*
- Faroe Islands – Abraham Løkin
- Finland – Jari Litmanen*
- France – Just Fontaine
- (Georgia (country)) Georgia – Murtaz Khurtsilava
- Germany – Fritz Walter
- Greece – Vasilis Hatzipanagis
- Hungary – Ferenc Puskás
- Iceland – Ásgeir Sigurvinsson
- Republic of Ireland – Johnny Giles
- Israel – Mordechai Spiegler
- Italy – Dino Zoff
- Kazakhstan – Sergey Kvochkin
- Latvia – Aleksandrs Starkovs
- Liechtenstein – Rainer Hasler
- Lithuania – Arminas Narbekovas*
- Luxembourg – Louis Pilot
- Malta – Carmel Busuttil
- Moldova – Pavel Cebanu
- Netherlands – Johan Cruyff
- Northern Ireland – George Best
- North Macedonia – Darko Pančev
- Norway – Rune Bratseth
- Poland – Włodzimierz Lubański
- Portugal – Eusébio
- Romania – Gheorghe Hagi
- Russia – Lev Yashin
- San Marino – Massimo Bonini
- Scotland – Denis Law
- Serbia and Montenegro – Dragan Džajić
- Slovakia – Ján Popluhár
- Slovenia – Branko Oblak
- Spain – Alfredo Di Stéfano
- Sweden – Henrik Larsson*
- Switzerland – Stéphane Chapuisat*
- Turkey – Hakan Şükür*
- Ukraine – Oleg Blokhin
- Wales – John Charles

== See also ==
- UEFA Golden Jubilee Poll
- CONMEBOL Jubilee Awards
