= Julio Maglione =

Uruguayan swimmer

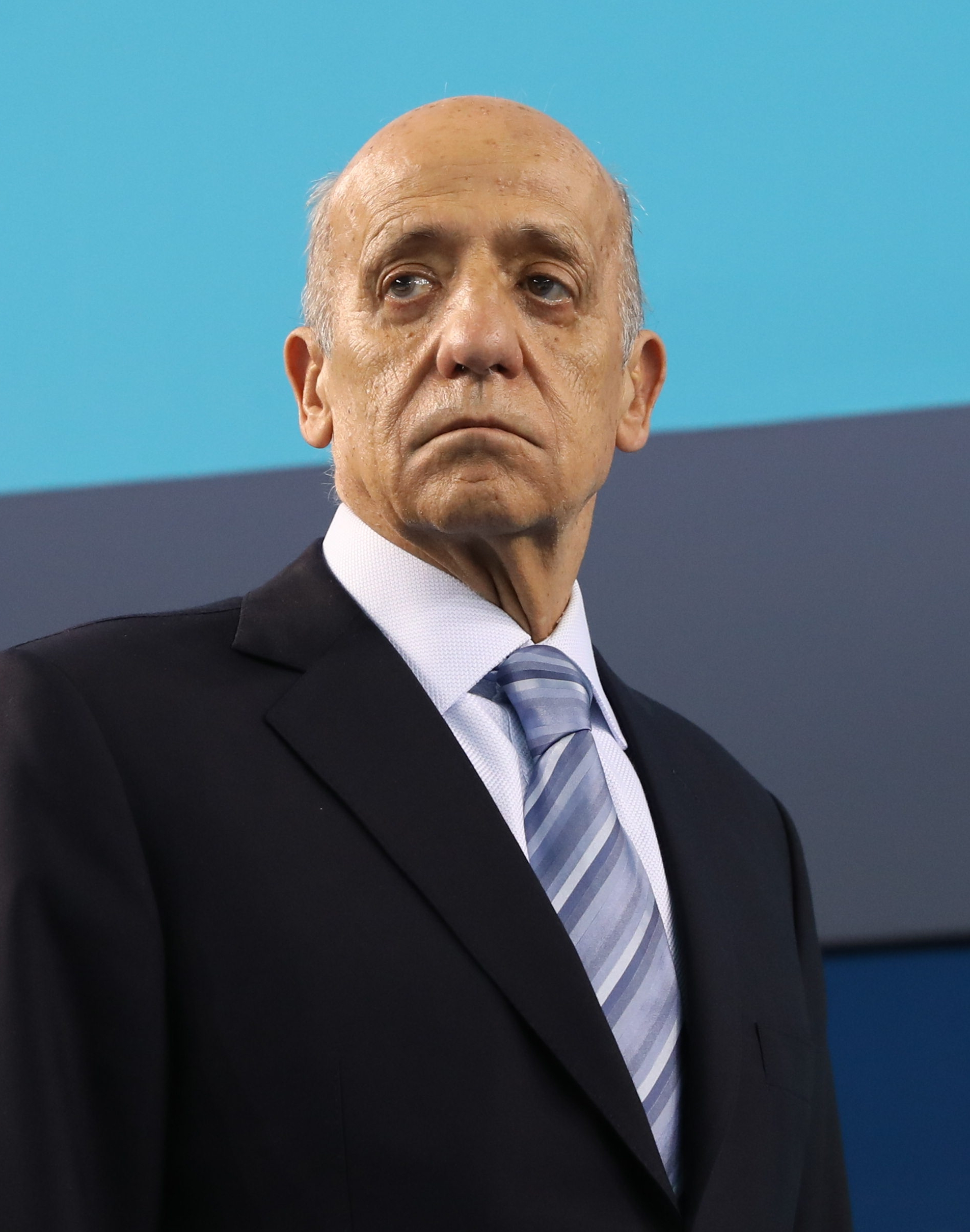
- Maglione in 2018.

President of FINA
- In office 2009–2021
- Vice President: Husain Al-Musallam; Sam Ramsamy
- Preceded by: Mustapha Larfaoui
- Succeeded by: Husain Al-Musallam

Personal details
- Born: Julio César Maglione; 14 November 1935 (age 90) Montevideo, Uruguay
- Children: 2

Julio César Maglione (born November 14, 1935, in Montevideo, Uruguay) is a former member of the International Olympic Committee (IOC) from Uruguay. He became an IOC member in 1996 and an honorary member in 2015.

Between 1989 and 1990, he served as president of the Uruguayan Football Association.

Maglione has been president of the Uruguayan Olympic Committee (Comité Olímpico Uruguayo, COU) since 1987. In July 2009, he was elected President of FINA, the International Swimming Federation. As of July 2013, he is about to be reelected for that post.

In September 2012, Maglione was reelected president of the COU for the period 2012–2016.

== Sports positions held ==
Organization	Position	Term
International Olympic Committee (IOC)	Member	1996–2015
Association of National Olympic Committees (ANOC)	Vice president (Americas)	2002–
Comité Olímpico Uruguayo	President	1987–
FINA	President	2009–2021
FINA	Honorary treasurer	1992–2009
FINA	Vice president	1988–92
CONSANAT	President	1976–78
Amateur Swimming Union of the Americas (ASUA)	President	1979–83; 1995–99
Federación Uruguaya de Natación (FUN) (Uruguayan Swimming Federation)	President	1969–1985
Asociación Uruguaya de Fútbol (AUF) (Uruguayan Football Association)	President	1989–1990

Preceded by Mustapha Larfaoui	FINA; 2009–present	Succeeded by incumbent
Preceded by Julio Franzini	Uruguayan Football Association; 1989–1990	Succeeded by Hugo Batalla
