= Sebastián Bauzá =

Uruguayan dentist, sports leader, politician and businessperson

Secretary of Sports of Uruguay
- In office 1 March 2020 – 1 March 2025
- President: Luis Alberto Lacalle Pou
- Preceded by: Fernando Cáceres
- Succeeded by: Alejandro Pereda

President of the Uruguayan Football Association
- In office 14 August 2009 – 2 March 2014
- Preceded by: Washington Rivero
- Succeeded by: Wilmar Valdez

Personal details
- Born: 17 May 1961 (age 65) Montevideo, Uruguay
- Party: National
- Spouse: Silvia
- Children: Belén, María Eugenia
- Parent: Sebastián Bauzá Ques
- Education: University of the Republic
- Occupation: Dentist, businessman, politician

Sebastian Bauza (born 17 May 1961 in Montevideo), is a Uruguayan dentist, sports leader, businessman and politician of the National Party (PN) who served as Secretary of Sports from 2020 to 2025.

== Family and education ==
He is the son of Sebastián Bauzá Ques. Graduated University of the Republic, he has a Dentistry degree. He is also a restaurateur in a family business and is owner and manager of confectionery Lion D'Or.

== Career ==
=== Sports ===
He presided over the Club Atlético Bella Vista like his father who led the club for 27 years. He was president of the Uruguayan Football Association from 2009 to 2014. In 2015, he declared in court with all the members of the South American Football Confederation for the Case FIFA. However, in 2017 his case is archived.

=== Politics ===
He ran in the 2015 Montevideo municipal election as deputy to Edgardo Novick and Álvaro Garcé. He was appointed Secretary of Sports in December 2019, after the victory of Luis Lacalle Pou as President of Uruguay. He took office on March 1, 2020.

Preceded by Washington Rivero	Uruguayan Football Association; 2009–2014	Succeeded by Wilmar Valdez
