= Wilmar Valdez =

Uruguayan football executive and interim president of CONMEBOL

- Born: 10 July 1965 (age 61); Tala, Uruguay
- Title: President of CONMEBOL (acting)
- Term: 2015–2016
- Predecessor: Juan Ángel Napout
- Successor: Alejandro Dominguez
- Children: 2

Wilmar Valdez (born 10 July 1965) is a Uruguayan football executive who served as interim President of CONMEBOL between 11 December 2015 and 26 January 2016. He took up the position after the resignation of Juan Ángel Napout which was related to the 2015 FIFA corruption case. Between 2014 and 2018 Valdez served as president of the Uruguayan Football Association. He also was a member of the FIFA Council between 2016 and 2018.

== Career ==
Valdez was born in Tala on 10 July 1965. During his time as a student in Montevideo he became a fan of the football club Rentistas. At age 21 Valdez started working for the club. His relationship with the club was further strengthened when his brother started playing there. Valdez also worked as a sports journalist for a while. At Rentistas he served in different functions, including terms as Secretary General and President for four years.

On 3 April 2014 Valdez was elected as president of the Uruguayan Football Association, where he was the candidate for Rentistas. He succeeded Sebastián Bauzá as president.

Valdez was elected third Vice President of CONMEBOL on 4 March 2015. On 11 December 2015, after the resignation of CONMEBOL president Juan Ángel Napout related to the 2015 FIFA corruption case, Valdez became interim President. First Vice President Rafael Esquivel had already been arrested in May and second Vice President Sergio Jadue had entered into a guilty plea with United States prosecutors the day before Valdez his appointment. Valdez's term as interim President ended on 26 January 2016, when a CONMEBOL congress was convened to elect new officials. His successor was Alejandro Domínguez.

In 2016 Valdez became member of the FIFA Council. Valdez resigned his position as president of the Uruguayan Football Association on 30 July 2018 for personal reasons. His resignation came the day before the date when elections were scheduled in which Valdez ran for re-election for Valdez's successor. On 21 August 2018 FIFA took over the control of the Uruguayan Football Association to ensure free and fair elections. CONMEBOL removed Valdez as member of the FIFA Council in October 2018 and appointed Argentine football president Claudio Tapia as interim successor.

In February 2020 the adjudicatory chamber of the FIFA Ethics Committee found Valdez guilty of violations and sanctioned him with a one-year ban of all football related activity and a fine of 10,000 Swiss franc.

== Personal life ==
Valdez is married and has two children.

Preceded by Juan Ángel Napout	President of CONMEBOL; 2015–2016	Succeeded by Alejandro Domínguez
Preceded by Sebastián Bauzá	President of the Uruguayan Football Association; 2014–2018	Succeeded by Ignacio Alonso Labat
