= Juan Ángel Napout =

Paraguayan football executive

Juan Ángel Napout Barreto
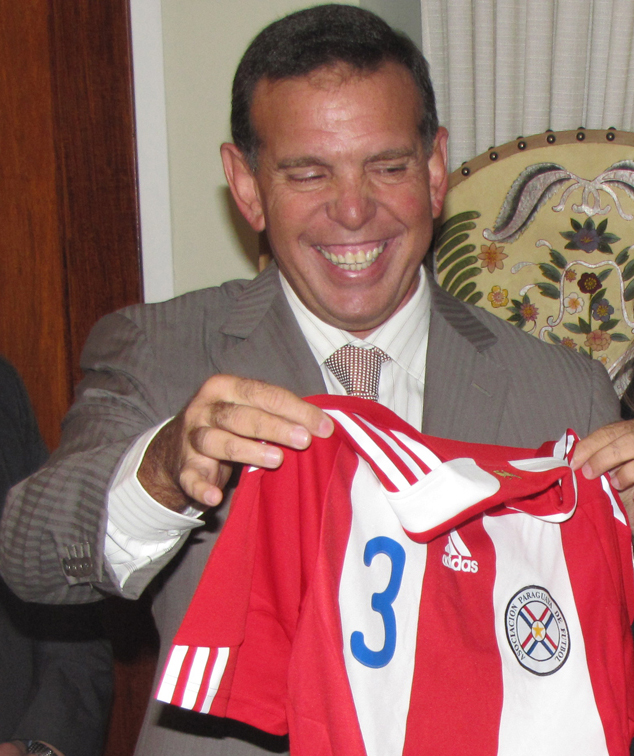
- Juan Napout in 2010
- Born: 13 May 1958 (age 68); Asunción, Paraguay
- Title: President of CONMEBOL
- Term: 2014–2015
- Predecessor: Eugenio Figueredo
- Successor: Alejandro Dominguez

Juan Ángel Napout Barreto (born 13 May 1958) is a Paraguayan football executive, businessman, and convicted felon. He was head of the Paraguayan Football Association from 2007 to 2014. Napout served as President of CONMEBOL from August 2014 until his resignation on 11 December 2015 after his arrest in Zurich, Switzerland, in relation to the 2015 FIFA corruption case. In December 2015, he was banned by the FIFA Ethics Committee for 90 days. In 2017, he was convicted in the United States of racketeering conspiracy and wire fraud conspiracy for accepting millions of dollars in bribes in connection with the sale of media and marketing rights for international football tournaments. In 2018, he was sentenced to nine years in prison, ordered to forfeit approximately US$3.37 million, and fined US$1 million. FIFA subsequently banned him from all football related activities for life.

== Biography ==
Napout was born on 13 May 1958 in Asunción, Paraguay. In June 1989, at the age of 32, Napout became the President of the Paraguayan football club Cerro Porteño. From 2007 to 2014, Napout was President of the Paraguayan Football Association.

Napout succeeded Eugenio Figueredo as President of CONMEBOL in August 2014 on an interim basis. On 4 March 2015 he was re-elected for a full term as President of CONMEBOL and was also appointed Vice-President of FIFA.

Napout was arrested in Zürich on 3 December 2015 on charges of accepting bribes. On 11 December 2015 Napout resigned as President of CONMEBOL and was succeeded in interim capacity by Wilmar Valdez.

After his arrest Napout agreed to extradition and appeared before a federal judge in New York on 15 December 2015 and declared himself not guilty on the five charges brought against him. He was afterwards released on bail. His trial commenced in November 2017. He was accused by U.S. authorities of racketeering conspiracy as well as wire fraud and money laundering conspiracy. The U.S. assistant attorney stated he requested and accepted bribes. On 22 December 2017 Napout was found guilty on three counts of racketeering conspiracy and wire fraud conspiracy. On 29 August 2018, Napout was sentenced to nine years in prison.

In November 2017, investigations of the Paradise Papers revealed that, in 2010, Napout created a company in the Bahamas the day he started to receive bribes from the Datisa (the consortium handling football broadcasting rights in Paraguay). A proxy bank account based in Switzerland was also set under his wife's name (Ruth Forster) to wire the money from the Bahamas to a European account and reroute it back to Paraguay. In 2015, he allegedly received 1 million dollars in bribes on the Copa América 2015 deals.

In September 2019, FIFA banned Napout for life.

== In popular culture ==
Agustín Moya portrayed Napout in the 2020 Amazon Prime Video original series El Presidente.
