= Raúl Jude =

Uruguayan lawyer and political figure

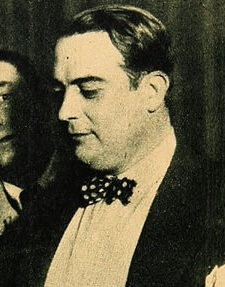
Image of Raúl Jude

Raúl Jude (1891–1971) was a Uruguayan lawyer and political figure.

== Background ==
Jude was born in Montevideo in 1891.

A prominent member of the Uruguayan Colorado Party, he was a lawyer by profession.

His son, Raumar Jude, served as a Deputy and Senator.

== Public offices ==
First elected as a Deputy in 1923, he served as Justice Minister under President José Serrato. He subsequently served as Interior Minister under President Gabriel Terra.

He also served as a Senator.

Between 1927 and 1930, and between 1934 and 1937, he served as president of the Uruguayan Football Association

== See also ==
- Politics of Uruguay
- List of political families#Uruguay

Preceded by Héctor Rivadavia Gómez	Uruguayan Football Association; 1927–1930	Succeeded by César Batlle Pacheco
Preceded by Mario Ponce De León	Uruguayan Football Association; 1934–1937	Succeeded by Aníbal Garderes
