= Eugenio Figueredo =

Uruguayan footballer and executive (born 1932)

- Born: Eugenio Hermes Figueredo Aguerre; 10 March 1932 (age 94); Santa Lucía, Uruguay
- Occupations: football player, executive
- Title: President of CONMEBOL
- Term: 2013–2014
- Predecessor: Nicolás Leoz
- Successor: Juan Ángel Napout
- Spouse: María del Carmen Burgos

Eugenio Hermes Figueredo Aguerre (born 10 March 1932 in Santa Lucía, Uruguay) is a Uruguayan and American association football executive and former footballer. In May 2015, he was banned by FIFA Ethics Committee.

== Biography ==
As a footballer, Figueredo played for Huracan Buceo as a right-half. He went on to serve as its president between 1971 and 1972, and again between 1976 and 77.

From 1997–2006, he presided over the Uruguayan Football Association, and from 1993 until 2013 he was vice president of CONMEBOL. In April 2013 he replaced Nicolás Leoz as President.

On 27 May 2015, Figueredo was arrested in Switzerland as the result of an FBI investigation into corruption in FIFA. In addition, the FIFA Ethics Committee found Figueredo to be guilty of taking bribes in 2004 and 2015 in connection with trade agreements for South American tournaments. He was fined one million Swiss francs ($1 million). Both Uruguay and the United States sought his extradition. He agreed to be extradited to Uruguay and was sent there on 24 December 2015. Figueredo was kept under house arrest in Uruguay. He was released from house arrest in December 2017.

On 2 October 2019, Figueredo was found guilty of bribery by the Ethics Committee and sanctioned with a ban for life on participating in any football-related activity.

== In popular culture ==
Chilean actor Sergio Hernández portrayed Figueredo in the 2020 Amazon Prime Video original series El Presidente.

Preceded by Carlos Maresca	Uruguayan Football Association; 1997–2006	Succeeded by José Luis Corbo
Preceded by Nicolás Leoz	President of CONMEBOL; 2013–2014	Succeeded by Juan Ángel Napout
