= 2028 Africa Cup of Nations bids =

The 2028 Africa Cup of Nations bids refer to the selection process organised by the Confederation of African Football (CAF) to determine the host nation(s) for the 2028 edition of the tournament. 2028 Africa Cup of Nations will mark the beginning of a new era for the Africa Cup of Nations, as it inaugurates the competition’s four-year hosting cycle.

In December 2025, CAF opened bidding for the 2028, 2032, and 2036 Africa Cup of Nations tournaments, with a deadline of 1 February 2026 for submission of official bid documents, including formal government guarantees.

On 12 February 2026, CAF confirmed that it had received three official bids to host the 2028 tournament: Ethiopia, Morocco, and a joint bid from Botswana and South Africa. On 19 May 2026, the newly elected Council of Southern African Football Associations president Tariq Babitseng confirmed a new submission joint bid by the football associations of Botswana, South Africa, Namibia, and Zimbabwe to host the 2028 Africa Cup of Nations (AFCON).

== Bids ==
=== Botswana, Namibia, South Africa & Zimbabwe (joint bid) ===
In January 2026, Botswana and South Africa announced a joint bid to host the 2028 Africa Cup of Nations. The proposal was presented during a meeting of the CAF Executive Committee in Rabat, Morocco, where future continental competitions were discussed.

Interest from Lesotho, Mozambique, Namibia, and Zimbabwe was reported during early consultations; however, no additional countries joined the bid, and Botswana and South Africa proceeded as dual co-hosts. CAF officially confirmed the Botswana–South Africa joint bid on 12 February 2026.

On 19 May 2026, the football associations of Botswana, South Africa, Namibia, and Zimbabwe submitted a joint bid to host the 2028 Africa Cup of Nations (AFCON), according to newly elected Council of Southern African Football Associations president Tariq Babitseng.

South Africa previously hosted the Africa Cup of Nations in 1996 and 2013, while Botswana, Namibia and Zimbabwe have never hosted the tournament. However, Zimbabwe was originally selected to host the 2000 tournament; the Confederation of African Football (CAF) stripped them of their hosting rights due to delays in preparations, and the event was instead held jointly by Ghana and Nigeria.

=== Ethiopia ===
On 2 January 2026, the Ethiopian Football Federation (EFF) confirmed that it had submitted an official bid to host the 2028 Africa Cup of Nations. Although Ethiopia did not have any CAF-approved stadiums at the time, the Ministry of Culture and Sports announced plans to construct six new stadiums as part of a long-term infrastructure strategy.

Ethiopia has previously hosted AFCON in 1962, 1968 and 1976.

=== Morocco ===
On 28 December 2025, during its hosting of the 2025 Africa Cup of Nations, Morocco expressed interest in hosting the 2028 tournament as part of preparations for the Centenary 2030 FIFA World Cup, which it will co-host with Portugal and Spain, along with their bid to host the 2029 FIFA Club World Cup. The bid was also reported to align with Morocco’s broader international football hosting ambitions.

Morocco hosted in 1988 and the 2025 tournament, which was reported to have generated record global viewership and digital engagement.

=== Previously expressed interest in bidding ===
The following countries previously expressed interest in bidding but did not submit official proposals for the 2028 tournament; they may instead target the 2032 and 2036 editions of the Africa Cup of Nations.

- Angola – After speaking to the local media in 2023, President João Lourenço stated that Angola was preparing to submit a future bid. The country hosted the AFCON in 2010.
- Democratic Republic of the Congo & Republic of the Congo – Following a fourth-place finish at the 2023, the President of the Democratic Republic of the Congo announced plans to prepare a future bid. In December 2024, the Minister of Sports of the DR Congo confirmed that a joint bid with the Republic of the Congo was under development. Although Kinshasa hosted the 2023 Francophone Games, neither nation has previously hosted the Africa Cup of Nations.
- Egypt – On 30 December 2025, Mohamed El-Shazly, spokesperson for Egypt’s Ministry of Youth and Sports, announced Egypt’s intention to apply to host the 2028 tournament. However, on 1 February 2026, Egypt confirmed it would instead refocus its efforts on the 2032 and 2036 editions.
- Equatorial Guinea – During a visit by CAF President Patrice Motsepe, the government of Equatorial Guinea expressed interest in bidding for the future editions. The country previously hosted the Africa Cup of Nations in 2012 (with Gabon) and 2015, after the original hosts, Morocco, withdrew due to the Western African Ebola epidemic.
- Guinea & Mali — Mali previously hosted the Africa Cup of Nations in 2002 and the U-17 Africa Cup of Nations in 1995. Guinea has never hosted the senior tournament and withdrew from hosting the 2025 edition due to preparation delays, but it has hosted the U-17 tournament in 1999. On 5 October 2025, Guinea confirmed its intention to bid for a future Africa Cup of Nations.
- Rwanda – Rwanda has never hosted the Africa Cup of Nations but has previously staged youth competitions, including the U-20 Africa Cup of Nations in 2009 and the U-17 edition in 2011.
- Senegal (potentially with Mauritania) – On 18 September 2024, the Director General of SOGIP (Société de Gestion des Infrastructures Publiques des pôles urbains de Diamniadio et du Lac Rose) confirmed that Senegal intended to submit a bid for the 2029 tournament. However, Senegal withdrew on 18 October 2024, citing infrastructure constraints. In December 2025, Mauritania's football federation president, Ahmed Yahya, expressed interest in a potential joint bid with Senegal after Guinea declined a previous proposal.
- Zambia – After nine unsuccessful attempts to host the Africa Cup of Nations—most recently for the 2027 edition—Zambia expressed its intention to bid again. The country has never hosted the tournament and was previously stripped of the 1988 hosting rights due to financial difficulties.
