= Raumar Jude =

Uruguayan politician

Raumar Jude (born 1929- April 16, 2009 in Montevideo) was a Uruguayan political figure.

== Background ==
He was a member of the Uruguayan Colorado Party. His father was former Justice Minister and Interior Minister Raúl Jude.

== Political offices ==
He was elected as a Deputy in the 1950s and 1960s.

He subsequently served as a Senator in the 1970s, 1980s and 1990s.

== See also ==
- Politics of Uruguay
- Political Families of Uruguay
