= Copa América =

Association football tournament

CONMEBOL Copa América
- Organizer(s): CONMEBOL
- Founded: 1916; 110 years ago
- Region: South America
- Teams: 16 (2024)
- Qualifier for: Finalissima
- Related competitions: Copa América Femenina
- Current champion: Argentina (16th title)
- Most championships: Argentina (16 titles)
- Website: copaamerica.com
- Editions: 1916; 1917; 1919; 1920; 1921; 1922; 1923; 1924; 1925; 1926; 1927; 1929; 1935; 1937; 1939; 1941; 1942; 1945; 1946; 1947; 1949; 1953; 1955; 1956; 1957; 1959 (A); 1959 (E); 1963; 1967; 1975; 1979; 1983; 1987; 1989; 1991; 1993; 1995; 1997; 1999; 2001; 2004; 2007; 2011; 2015; 2016; 2019; 2021; 2024; 2028

The CONMEBOL Copa América ('Americas Cup'; known until 1975 as the South American Football Championship) is the top-flight football tournament for men's national teams in South America. Held every four years, it is the oldest extant continental football competition. The Copa América determines the South American men's national team champion, minus Suriname, Guyana and French Guiana. Since the 1990s, teams from North America and Asia have also been invited to compete.

Eight of the ten CONMEBOL national teams have won the tournament at least once in its 48 stagings since the event's inauguration in 1916, with Ecuador and Venezuela the only teams yet to win. Argentina have the most championships in the tournament's history, with 16 cups. The country that hosted the tournament the most times (nine editions) is Argentina, including the inaugural edition in 1916. The United States is the only non-CONMEBOL country that hosted the event, having done so in both 2016 and 2024. On three occasions (in 1975, 1979, and 1983), the tournament was held in multiple South American countries.

Since 1993, the tournament has generally featured 12 teams — all 10 CONMEBOL teams and two additional teams from other confederations. Mexico participated in every tournament between 1993 and 2016, with one additional team drawn from CONCACAF, except for 1999, when AFC team Japan filled out the 12-team roster, and 2019, which featured Japan and Qatar. The 2016 and 2024 tournaments both featured 16 teams, with six teams from CONCACAF in addition to the 10 from CONMEBOL.

== History ==
=== South American Football Championship era (1916–1967) ===
==== Beginnings (1916–1929) ====
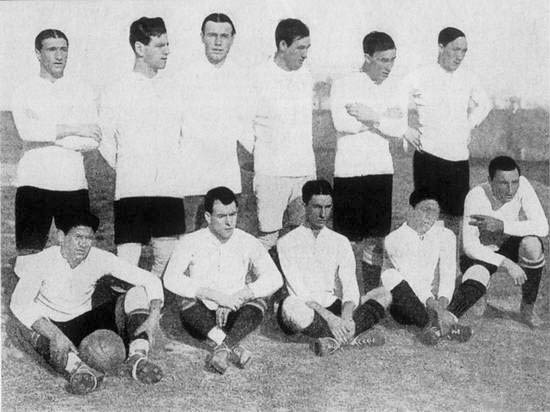
The first edition was held in 1916 and won by Uruguay (pictured)

The first football team in South America, Lima Cricket and Football Club, was established in Peru in 1859, and the Argentine Football Association was founded in 1893. By the early 20th century, football was growing in popularity, and the first international competition held among national teams of the continent occurred in 1910 when Argentina organized an event to commemorate the centenary of the May Revolution. Chile and Uruguay participated, but this event is not considered official by CONMEBOL. Similarly, for the centennial celebration of its independence, Argentina held a tournament between 2 and 17 July 1916 with Argentina, Chile, Uruguay and Brazil being the first participants of the tournament. This so-called Campeonato Sudamericano de Football would be the first edition of what is currently known as Copa América; Uruguay would triumph in this first edition after tying 0–0 with hosts Argentina in the deciding, last match held in Estadio Racing Club in Avellaneda.

Seeing the success of the tournament, a boardmember of the Uruguayan Football Association, Héctor Rivadavia, proposed the establishment of a confederation of the associations of Argentina, Brazil, Chile and Uruguay. On 9 July, independence day in Argentina, CONMEBOL was founded. The following year, the competition was played again, this time in Uruguay. Uruguay would win the title again to win their bicampeonato after defeating Argentina 1–0 in the last match of the tournament. The success of the tournament on Charrúan soil would help consolidate the tournament.

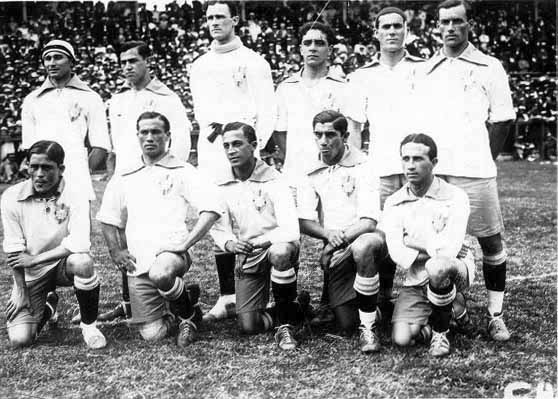
Brazil achieved its first championship in 1919

After a flu outbreak in Rio de Janeiro canceled the tournament in 1918, Brazil hosted the tournament in 1919 and was crowned champion for the first time after defeating the defending champions 1–0 in a playoff match to decide the title, while the Chilean city of Viña del Mar would host the 1920 event which was won by Uruguay.

For the 1921 event, Paraguay participated for the first time after its football association affiliated to CONMEBOL earlier that same year. Argentina won the competition for the first time thanks to the goals of Julio Libonatti. In subsequent years, Uruguay would dominate the tournament, which at that time was the largest football tournament in the world. Argentina, however, would not be far behind and disputed the supremacy with the Charruas. After losing the 1928 final at the 1928 Summer Olympics held in Amsterdam, Argentina would gain revenge in the 1929 South American Championship by defeating the Uruguayans in the last, decisive match. During this period, both Bolivia and Peru debuted in the tournament in 1926 and 1927, respectively.

==== Disorganization and intermittency (1930–1967) ====
After the first World Cup held in Uruguay in 1930, the enmity between the football federations of Uruguay and Argentina prevented the competition from being played for a number of years. Only in 1935 was it possible to dispute a special edition of the event to be officially reinstated in 1939. Peru became the host nation of the 1939 edition and won the competition for the first time. Ecuador made their debut at that tournament.

In 1941, Chile hosted that year's edition in celebration of the 400th anniversary of the founding of Santiago for which the capacity of the newly built Estadio Nacional was expanded from 30,000 to 70,000 spectators. Despite the large investment and initial success of the team, the Chileans would be defeated in the last match by eventual champions Argentina. Uruguay hosted and won the 1942 edition. Chile would host again in 1945, and came close to playing for the title against Argentina. However, Brazil spoiled that possibility, and Argentina would win the tournament once again on Chilean soil.

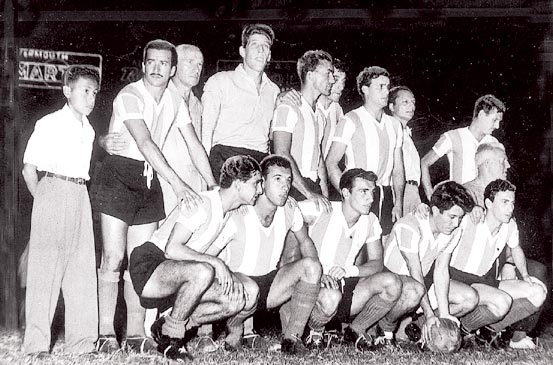
The Carasucias ("dirty faces"), a name that was known for the Argentina squad that won the 1957 championship held in Peru

The event then entered a period of great disruption. The championship was not played on a regular basis and many editions would be deemed unofficial, only to be considered valid later on by CONMEBOL. For example, Argentina would be the first (and so far only) team to win three consecutive titles by winning the championships of 1945, 1946 and 1947. After those three annual tournaments, the competition returned to being held every two years, then three and later four. There were even two tournaments held in 1959, one in Argentina and a second in Ecuador. During this period, some of the national teams were indifferent to the tournament. Some did not participate every year, others sent lesser teams; in the 1959 edition held in Ecuador, Brazil entered a team from the state of Pernambuco. Bolivia won for the first time when it hosted in 1963, but was defeated in the first game of the 1967 tournament by debutant Venezuela. The founding of the Copa Libertadores in 1959 also affected the way the tournament was viewed by its participants.

=== Copa América era (1975–present) ===
==== Renewal, name and format change (1975–1987) ====
After eight years of absence, the event resumed in 1975 and officially acquired the name Copa América. The tournament had no fixed venue, and all matches were played throughout the year in each country. Nine teams participated in the group stages with the defending champions receiving a bye into the semifinals. The tournament was contested every four years using this system until 1987. It also no longer held the round-robin tournament format and instead incorporated a group stage, knockout round and a final.

==== Host rotation (1987–2015) ====
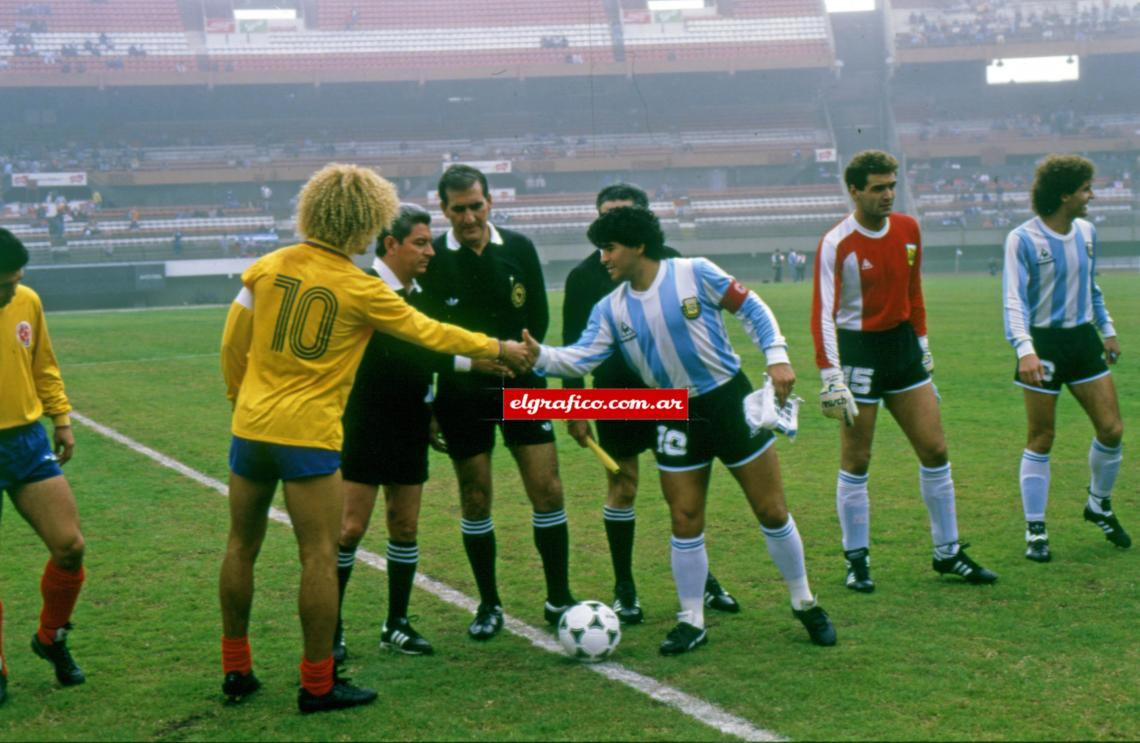
Carlos Valderrama and Diego Maradona greeting before the Argentina v Colombia match in 1987

In 1986, CONMEBOL decided to return to having one country host the tournament and to contest it every other year. From 1987 until 2001, the event was hosted every two years in rotation by the ten members of the confederation. The format would remain constant with a first round of groups, but the final round stage ranged from being a new, final round-robin group or a single-elimination system to decide the winner. This renewal helped the tournament, which began to receive television coverage in Europe and North America. The 1987 Copa América was held in Argentina; this was the first time the nation had hosted an edition in 28 years. Despite entering as heavy favorites for being the reigning world champions (having won the 1986 FIFA World Cup), playing at home and having a team largely composed of its World Cup winners led by the legendary Diego Maradona, Argentina would finish in a disappointing fourth place after being beaten by defending champions Uruguay 0–1 in the semifinals. Uruguay would defeat a surprisingly strong Chilean squad who made it to the final, disposing of the powerful Brazil 4–0 on the group stage.

Brazil lifted its first official international title since the 1970 FIFA World Cup upon winning the 1989 Copa América held on home soil. Argentina, in turn, won the Copa América after 32 long years in 1991 in Chile, thanks to a refreshed squad led by the prolific goalscorer Gabriel Batistuta. The 1993 Copa América tournament in Ecuador would take its current form. Along with the usual ten teams, CONMEBOL invited two countries from CONCACAF to participate, Mexico and the United States.

Uruguay managed to win the competition in 1995 as host, ending a period of decline for Uruguayan football. With the implementation of rotating hosts, Colombia, Paraguay and Venezuela hosted the tournament for the first time. Brazil entered a series of victories, winning four of the five continental titles between 1997 and 2007. The first, in 1997, was won after defeating host nation Bolivia 1–3 with goals from Leonardo, Denílson and Ronaldo becoming crucial in the Verde-Amarela's consecration on Bolivia's altitude. Brazil would successfully defend the title in 1999 after thumping Uruguay 3–0 in Asunción, Paraguay. However, the 2001 Copa América saw one of the biggest surprises of the history of the sport as Honduras eliminated Brazil in the quarterfinals. Colombia, the host nation, would go on to win the competition for the first time ever.

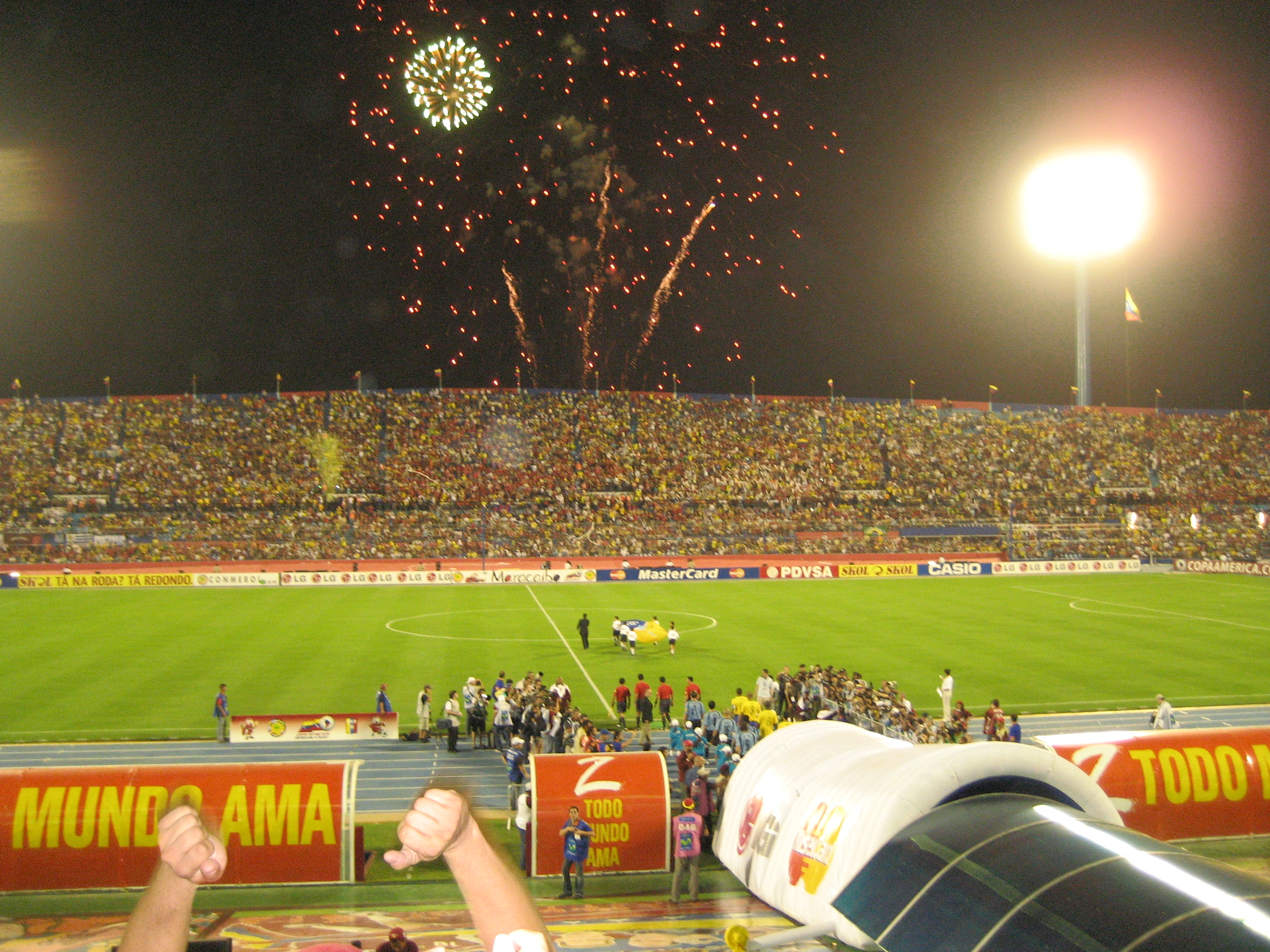
Aftermath of a match in the 2007 Copa América, held for the first time in Venezuela.

From 2001 to 2007, the tournament was contested every three years, and from 2007 forward every four years, with the exception of the tournament's centennial in 2016.

Running from an embarrassing performance in 2001, Brazil reestablished itself in the South American pantheon after defeating Argentina, on penalties, in order to win the 2004 competition held in Peru. Three years later, the two teams met again in the final, this time in Venezuela. Once again, Brazil came out victorious after crushing Argentina 3–0.

Argentina hosted the 2011 competition and was ousted by Uruguay in the quarterfinals by penalty shootout. Uruguay would go on defeating Peru 2–0 in the semis to reach the finals and overpower Paraguay 3–0, thus winning the trophy on Argentinean soil for the third time and second in a row. This, the 43rd edition, was the first time that neither Argentina nor Brazil reached the semifinals of a tournament they both had entered.

The 2015 competition was hosted in Chile, who swapped hosting positions with Brazil in light of the latter's hosting of the 2014 FIFA World Cup and 2016 Summer Olympics. Chile went on to win the tournament, their first title, on home soil.

==== Centenary and beyond (2016–present) ====
In 2016, the centenary of the tournament was celebrated with the Copa América Centenario tournament hosted in the United States; the tournament was the first to be hosted outside of South America and had an expanded field of 16 teams from CONMEBOL and CONCACAF. During the tournament, media outlets reported that CONMEBOL and CONCACAF were negotiating a merger of the Copa América with the CONCACAF Gold Cup, the latter's continental tournament held every two years, with the United States hosting regular tournaments; United States Soccer Federation president Sunil Gulati called the report inaccurate, saying that no such discussion had taken place and that a new tournament would have to be established. For the second time, Chile won the trophy in a penalty shoot-out. The 2016 edition broke tournament records for attendance, with 1.5 million total spectators and an average of 46,000 per match through the semi-finals.

Brazil hosted the 2019 edition, which was played in the normal four-year cycle, and won their ninth title by defeating Peru in the final at the renovated Maracanã Stadium. CONMEBOL approved a permanent switch from odd to even years beginning with the 2020 Copa América to move in line with the UEFA European Championship, which would be jointly hosted by Argentina and Colombia and split into two groups. The tournament was postponed by a year due to the COVID-19 pandemic and lost two invited teams from Asia—Australia and Qatar—due to fixture congestion. Colombia requested that the tournament be moved to November 2021 due to widespread protests and increased COVID-19 cases, but withdrew after CONMEBOL rejected a second postponement. 13 days prior to the opening match, the entire tournament was moved to Brazil due to a rise in COVID-19 cases in Argentina. The 2021 Copa América was played by 10 teams with no spectators at most matches due to the pandemic; the final at the Maracanã was limited to 10 percent of capacity. Argentina won their first title in 28 years by defeating Brazil in the final.

CONMEBOL and CONCACAF signed a collaborative partnership agreement in January 2023 that included the United States being selected as host for the 2024 Copa América, which would feature six CONCACAF teams. The tournament would share some venues with the 2026 FIFA World Cup, which was co-hosted by the United States.

== Hosts ==
Map of Copa América hosts 9 7 6 3 2 1

In 1984, CONMEBOL adopted the policy of rotating the right to host the Copa América amongst the ten member confederations. The first rotation was completed following the 2007 Copa América which took place in Venezuela. A second rotation commenced in 2011, with host countries rotating in alphabetical order, starting with Argentina. Chile, Mexico and the United States expressed interest in hosting the next tournament, but the CONMEBOL Executive Committee decided to continue the execution of the rotation, giving priority of the organization to each of its member associations; each association confirms whether they will host an edition or not, having no obligation to do so. Argentina confirmed on 24 November 2008, via representatives of the Argentine Football Association, that it would host the 2011 Copa América.

The 2015 Copa América was due to be held in Brazil following the order of rotation. However, as Brazil was hosting both the 2014 FIFA World Cup and the 2016 Summer Olympics, the decision was reconsidered. Although CONMEBOL President Nicolas Leoz proposed hosting the continental tournament in Mexico (a member of the CONCACAF federation) and board members Brazil and Chile discussed the possibility of exchanging the 2015 and 2019 tournaments, it was decided and confirmed by the CBF in February 2011 that the 2015 Copa América would remain in Brazil. However, in March 2012, CBF president Ricardo Teixeira resigned from his position and the CBF agreed to swap the tournament's hosting with Chile. The swap was made official in May 2012. The centennial edition of the tournament, Copa América Centenario, took place in June 2016, and was held in the United States, and marked the first time the tournament was hosted by a non-CONMEBOL nation.

Each Copa América since 2005 has had its own mascot. Gardelito, the mascot for the 1987 competition, was the first Copa América mascot.

Hosts	Editions hosted
Argentina	9 (1916, 1921, 1925, 1929, 1937, 1946, 1959, 1987, 2011)
Uruguay	7 (1917, 1923, 1924, 1942, 1956, 1967, 1995)
Chile	7 (1920, 1926, 1941, 1945, 1955, 1991, 2015)
Brazil	6 (1919, 1922, 1949, 1989, 2019, 2021)
Peru	6 (1927, 1935, 1939, 1953, 1957, 2004)
Ecuador	3 (1947, 1959, 1993)
Bolivia	2 (1963, 1997)
United States*	2 (2016, 2024)
Paraguay	1 (1999)
Colombia	1 (2001)
Venezuela	1 (2007)
home-and-away basis	3 (1975, 1979, 1983)

* = non-CONMEBOL host.

== Format and rules ==
In early tournaments all teams competed in a round-robin stage, while later ones saw the teams were split into different groups followed by a single-elimination knockout stage.

Year	Teams	Matches		Format
Year	Teams	Min.	Act.	Format
1916	4	6		round-robin group of 4
1917	4	6		round-robin group of 4
1919	4	6	7	round-robin group of 4
1920	4	6		round-robin group of 4
1921	4	6		round-robin group of 4
1922	5	10	11	round-robin group of 5
1923	4	6		round-robin group of 4
1924	4	6		round-robin group of 4
1925	3	6		double round-robin group of 3
1926	5	10		round-robin group of 5
1927	4	6		round-robin group of 4
1929	4	6		round-robin group of 4
1935	4	6		round-robin group of 4
1937	6	15	16	round-robin group of 6
1939	5	10		round-robin group of 5
1941	5	10		round-robin group of 5
1942	7	21		round-robin group of 7
1945	7	21		round-robin group of 7
1946	6	15		round-robin group of 6
1947	8	28		round-robin group of 8
1949	8	28	29	round-robin group of 8
1953	7	21	22	round-robin group of 7
1955	6	15		round-robin group of 6
1956	6	15		round-robin group of 6
1957	7	21		round-robin group of 7
1959 (A)	7	21		round-robin group of 7
1959 (E)	5	10		round-robin group of 5
1963	7	21		round-robin group of 7
1967	6	15		round-robin group of 6
1975	10	24	25	3 groups of 3, semi-finals, (Note: Title holders joined from the semi-finals.) final (two-legged matches throughout the tournament)
1979	10	24	25	3 groups of 3, semi-finals, final (two-legged matches throughout the tournament)
1983	10	24		3 groups of 3, semi-finals, final (two-legged matches throughout the tournament)
1987	10	13		3 groups of 3, semi-finals, 3rd-place match, final
1989	10	26		2 groups of 5, final round-robin group of 4
1991	10	26		2 groups of 5, final round-robin group of 4
1993	12	26		3 groups of 4, quarter-finals, semi-finals, 3rd-place match, final
1995	12	26		3 groups of 4, quarter-finals, semi-finals, 3rd-place match, final
1997	12	26		3 groups of 4, quarter-finals, semi-finals, 3rd-place match, final
1999	12	26		3 groups of 4, quarter-finals, semi-finals, 3rd-place match, final
2001	12	26		3 groups of 4, quarter-finals, semi-finals, 3rd-place match, final
2004	12	26		3 groups of 4, quarter-finals, semi-finals, 3rd-place match, final
2007	12	26		3 groups of 4, quarter-finals, semi-finals, 3rd-place match, final
2011	12	26		3 groups of 4, quarter-finals, semi-finals, 3rd-place match, final
2015	12	26		3 groups of 4, quarter-finals, semi-finals, 3rd-place match, final
2016	16	32		4 groups of 4, quarter-finals, semi-finals, 3rd-place match, final
2019	12	26		3 groups of 4, quarter-finals, semi-finals, 3rd-place match, final
2021	10	28		2 groups of 5, quarter-finals, semi-finals, 3rd-place match, final
2024	16	32		4 groups of 4, quarter-finals, semi-finals, 3rd-place match, final

Notes

The tournament was previously known as Campeonato Sudamericano de Futbol (South American Championship of Football). South American Championship of Nations was the official English language name. The current name has been used since 1975. Up to 1967 if there was a tie of points at the top of the standings, a playoff match (or matches) would be held to determine the champion. Between 1975 and 1983 it had no fixed host nation, and was held in a home and away fashion. The current final tournament features 12 national teams competing over a month in the host nation. There are two phases: the group stage followed by the knockout stage. In the group stage, teams compete within three groups of four teams each. Three teams are seeded, including the hosts, with the other seeded teams selected using a formula based on the FIFA World Rankings. The other teams are assigned to different "pots", usually based also on the FIFA Rankings, and teams in each pot are drawn at random to the three groups.

Each group plays a round-robin tournament, in which each team is scheduled for three matches against other teams in the same group. In earlier tournaments, the last round of matches of each group were not scheduled at the same time unlike many tournaments around the world for unknown reasons, although more recent tournaments have adopted this rule. The top two teams from each group advance to the knockout stage. Points are used to rank the teams within a group. Beginning in 1995, three points have been awarded for a win, one for a draw and none for a loss (before, winners received two points).

The ranking of each team in each group is determined as follows:

a) greatest number of points obtained in all group matches;
b) goal difference in all group matches;
c) greatest number of goals scored in all group matches.

If two or more teams are equal on the basis of the above three criteria, their rankings are determined as follows:

d) greatest number of points obtained in the group matches between the teams concerned;
e) goal difference resulting from the group matches between the teams concerned;
f) greater number of goals scored in all group matches between the teams concerned;
g) drawing of lots by the CONMEBOL Organizing Committee (i.e. at random).

The knockout stage is a single-elimination tournament in which teams play each other in one-off matches, with penalty shootouts used to decide the winner if a match is still tied after 90 minutes in the quarter-finals and semi-finals, and after extra time in the final. It begins with the quarter-finals, then semi-finals, the third-place match (contested by the losing semi-finalists), and the final.

== Participating teams ==
All registered national federations of CONMEBOL, of which there currently are ten, are eligible for automatic berths in the tournament. Since the competition's rebranding in 1975, Argentina withdrawing from the 2001 edition due to scheduling and security disagreements remains the only time a CONMEBOL member did not participate in a tournament.

Owing to this somewhat limited number of available participants, countries from other continents have usually been invited to make up the 12 teams necessary for the current tournament format since 1993. Most often those have been from CONCACAF, whose members are geographically and culturally close. For the centennial edition in 2016 and for the one in 2024, reflecting the number of teams being increased to 16, qualification stages were held for the CONCACAF teams.

In all, ten non-South American nations have participated in Copa América at least once: CONCACAF members Canada, Costa Rica, Haiti, Honduras, Jamaica, Mexico, Panama, and the United States, as well as AFC members Japan and Qatar. Two other teams, China and Australia, had accepted invitations respectively for 2015 and 2021, but both did not end up appearing because of clashes with other commitments. Moreover, Spain was invited to the 2011 edition but declined to participate.

=== Team records ===
Regular participants

Team	Appearances as of 2024	First
Argentina	44	1916
Bolivia	29	1926
Brazil	38	1916
Chile	41	1916
Colombia	24	1945
Ecuador	30	1939
Paraguay	39	1921
Peru	34	1927
Uruguay	46	1916
Venezuela	20	1967

Invitees

Team	Appearances	First	Latest
CONCACAF
Canada	1	2024	
Costa Rica	6	1997	2024
Haiti	1	2016	
Honduras	1	2001	
Jamaica	3	2015	2024
Mexico	11	1993	2024
Panama	2	2016	2024
United States	5	1993	2024
AFC
Japan	2	1999	2019
Qatar	1	2019	

== Trophies ==
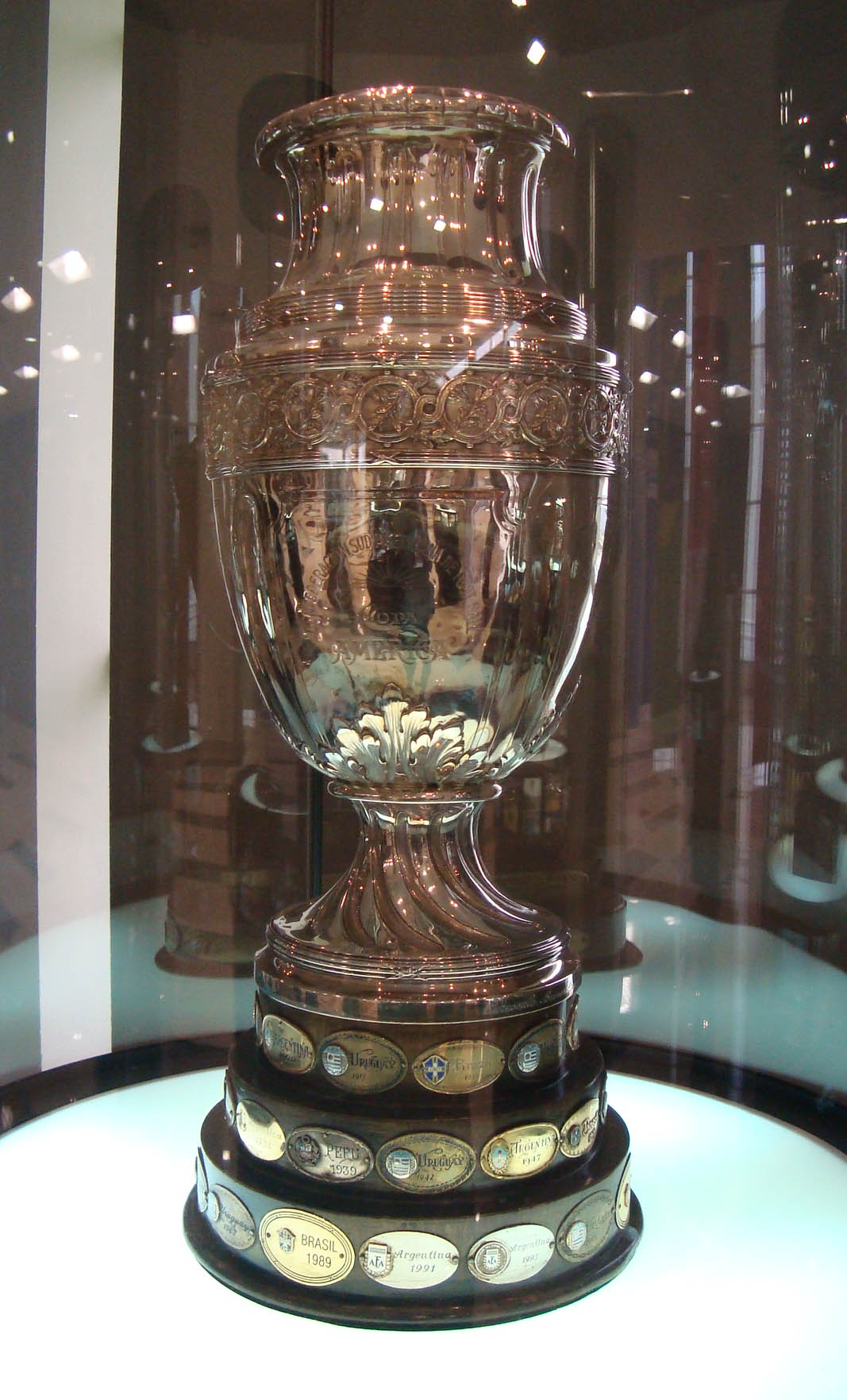
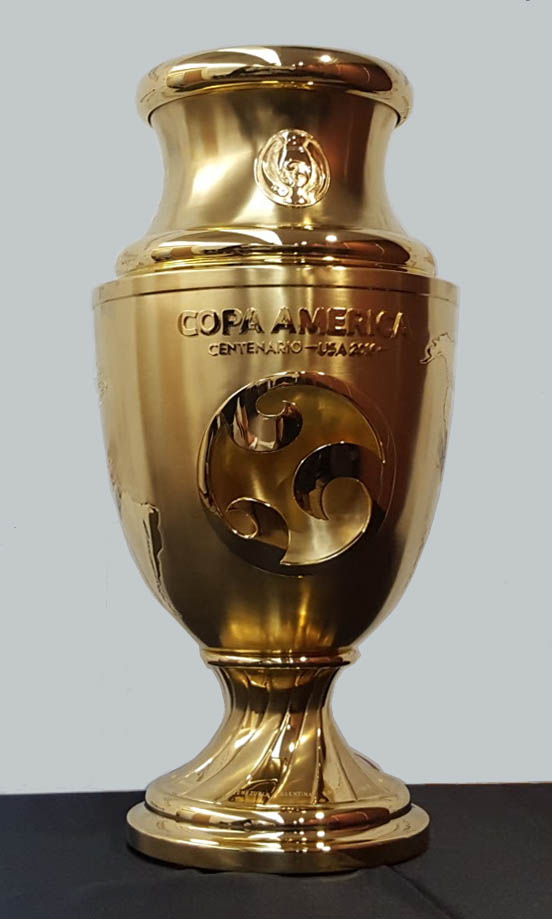
Current Copa América trophy (left) at the Conmebol Museum and the special edition awarded exclusively for Copa América Centenario in 2016

The Copa América trophy, which is awarded to the winners of the tournament, was donated to the Association by the Ministry of Foreign Affairs of Argentina, Ernesto Bosch, in 1910, when Argentina organized an event to commemorate the centenary of the May Revolution. That competition (also attended by Uruguay and Chile) was named "Copa del Centenario" (Centennial Cup).

The current Copa América trophy was purchased in 1916 from "Casa Escasany", a jewelry shop in Buenos Aires, at the cost of 3,000 Swiss francs.

The Copa América trophy is a 9 kg (20 lb) weight and 77 cm (30 in) tall silver ornament, with a 3-level wooden base which contains several plaques. The plaques are engraved with every winner of the competition, as well as the edition won. The trophy previously had a one- and two-level base, and prior to 1979 there was no base at all, like the one used in 1975.

In April 2016, a commemorative trophy – specifically designed for the Copa América Centenario – was introduced at the Colombian Football Federation headquarters of Bogotá to commemorate the 100th anniversary of the competition. The trophy was based on the original Copa América trophy's shape, added with the 2016 edition logo. The trophy was not to have a base. The CAC was 61 cm (24 in) tall with a weight of 7.1 kg (16 lb), covered by 24-carat gold. The emblems of CONMEBOL and CONCACAF were also engraved on its body.

The commemorative Copa América Centenario trophy was designed by Epico Studios in the United States and manufactured by London Workshops of Thomas Lyte in England. The winning team will keep the trophy in perpetuity.

Apart from the main trophy, the "Copa Bolivia" (a small trophy made in silver) has been awarded to the runner-up of the competition since the 1997 edition. The trophy is named after the country that hosted the 1997 Copa América, with a small Bolivian flag attached on one of its sides.

== Results ==
Tournament name

- 1916–1967: "South American Championship"
- 1975–present: "Copa América"

Key

- aet: after extra time
- p: penalty shoot-out
- Final played in two-legged format (with a playoff if necessary).

Ed.	Year	Host	Final			Third place game			Teams
Ed.	Year	Host	Champion	Score	Runner-up	Third	Score	Fourth	Teams
1	1916	Argentina	Uruguay	round-robin	Argentina	Brazil	round-robin	Chile	4
2	1917	Uruguay	Uruguay	round-robin	Argentina	Brazil	round-robin	Chile	4
3	1919	Brazil	Brazil	round-robin Play-off: 1–0 (a.e.t.)	Uruguay	Argentina	round-robin	Chile	4
4	1920	Chile	Uruguay	round-robin	Argentina	Brazil	round-robin	Chile	4
5	1921	Argentina	Argentina	round-robin	Brazil	Uruguay	round-robin	Paraguay	4
6	1922	Brazil	Brazil	round-robin Play-off: 3–0	Paraguay	Uruguay	round-robin	Argentina	5
7	1923	Uruguay	Uruguay	round-robin	Argentina	Paraguay	round-robin	Brazil	4
8	1924	Uruguay	Uruguay	round-robin	Argentina	Paraguay	round-robin	Chile	4
9	1925	Argentina	Argentina	round-robin	Brazil	Paraguay	round-robin	—N/a	3
10	1926	Chile	Uruguay	round-robin	Argentina	Chile	round-robin	Paraguay	5
11	1927	Peru	Argentina	round-robin	Uruguay	Peru	round-robin	Bolivia	4
12	1929	Argentina	Argentina	round-robin	Paraguay	Uruguay	round-robin	Peru	4
13	1935	Peru	Uruguay	round-robin	Argentina	Peru	round-robin	Chile	4
14	1937	Argentina	Argentina	round-robin Play-off: 2–0 (a.e.t.)	Brazil	Uruguay	round-robin	Paraguay	6
15	1939	Peru	Peru	round-robin	Uruguay	Paraguay	round-robin	Chile	5
16	1941	Chile	Argentina	round-robin	Uruguay	Chile	round-robin	Peru	5
17	1942	Uruguay	Uruguay	round-robin	Argentina	Brazil	round-robin	Paraguay	7
18	1945	Chile	Argentina	round-robin	Brazil	Chile	round-robin	Uruguay	7
19	1946	Argentina	Argentina	round-robin	Brazil	Paraguay	round-robin	Uruguay	6
20	1947	Ecuador	Argentina	round-robin	Paraguay	Uruguay	round-robin	Chile	8
21	1949	Brazil	Brazil	round-robin Play-off: 7–0	Paraguay	Peru	round-robin	Bolivia	8
22	1953	Peru	Paraguay	round-robin Play-off: 3–2	Brazil	Uruguay	round-robin	Chile	7
23	1955	Chile	Argentina	round-robin	Chile	Peru	round-robin	Uruguay	6
24	1956	Uruguay	Uruguay	round-robin	Chile	Argentina	round-robin	Brazil	6
25	1957	Peru	Argentina	round-robin	Brazil	Uruguay	round-robin	Peru	7
26	1959	Argentina	Argentina	round-robin	Brazil	Paraguay	round-robin	Peru	7
27	1959	Ecuador	Uruguay	round-robin	Argentina	Brazil	round-robin	Ecuador	5
28	1963	Bolivia	Bolivia	round-robin	Paraguay	Argentina	round-robin	Brazil	7
29	1967	Uruguay	Uruguay	round-robin	Argentina	Chile	round-robin	Paraguay	6
30	1975	Home-and-away basis	Peru	0–1; 2–0; Play-off: 1–0	Colombia	Brazil and Uruguay (Note: No third place match was played; teams are listed in alphabetical order.)			10
31	1979	Home-and-away basis	Paraguay	3–0; 0–1; Play-off: 0–0 (a.e.t.)	Chile	Brazil and Peru			10
31	1979	Home-and-away basis	Paraguay	Paraguay won 3–1 on aggregate	Chile	Brazil and Peru			10
32	1983	Home-and-away basis	Uruguay	2–0; 1–1	Brazil	Paraguay and Peru			10
32	1983	Home-and-away basis	Uruguay	Uruguay won 3–1 on aggregate	Brazil	Paraguay and Peru			10
33	1987	Argentina	Uruguay	1–0	Chile	Colombia	2–1	Argentina	10
34	1989	Brazil	Brazil	round-robin	Uruguay	Argentina	round-robin	Paraguay	10
35	1991	Chile	Argentina	round-robin	Brazil	Chile	round-robin	Colombia	10
36	1993	Ecuador	Argentina	2–1	Mexico	Colombia	1–0	Ecuador	12
37	1995	Uruguay	Uruguay	1–1 (5–3 p)	Brazil	Colombia	4–1	United States	12
38	1997	Bolivia	Brazil	3–1	Bolivia	Mexico	1–0	Peru	12
39	1999	Paraguay	Brazil	3–0	Uruguay	Mexico	2–1	Chile	12
40	2001	Colombia	Colombia	1–0	Mexico	Honduras	2–2 (5–4 p)	Uruguay	12
41	2004	Peru	Brazil	2–2 (4–2 p)	Argentina	Uruguay	2–1	Colombia	12
42	2007	Venezuela	Brazil	3–0	Argentina	Mexico	3–1	Uruguay	12
43	2011	Argentina	Uruguay	3–0	Paraguay	Peru	4–1	Venezuela	12
44	2015	Chile	Chile	0–0 (a.e.t.) (4–1 p)	Argentina	Peru	2–0	Paraguay	12
45	2016	United States	Chile	0–0 (a.e.t.) (4–2 p)	Argentina	Colombia	1–0	United States	16
46	2019	Brazil	Brazil	3–1	Peru	Argentina	2–1	Chile	12
47	2021	Brazil	Argentina	1–0	Brazil	Colombia	3–2	Peru	10
48	2024	United States	Argentina	1–0 (a.e.t.)	Colombia	Uruguay	2–2 (4–3 p)	Canada	16
49	2028								

== Teams reaching the top four ==
Team	Title(s)	Runners-up	Third place	Fourth place
Argentina	16 (1921*, 1925*, 1927, 1929*, 1937*, 1941, 1945, 1946*, 1947, 1955, 1957, 1959*, 1991, 1993, 2021, 2024)	14 (1916*, 1917, 1920, 1923, 1924, 1926, 1935, 1942, 1959, 1967, 2004, 2007, 2015, 2016)	5 (1919, 1956, 1963, 1989, 2019)	2 (1922, 1987*)
Uruguay	15 (1916, 1917*, 1920, 1923*, 1924*, 1926, 1935, 1942*, 1956*, 1959, 1967*, 1983, 1987, 1995*, 2011)	6 (1919, 1927, 1939, 1941, 1989, 1999)	10 (1921, 1922, 1929, 1937, 1947, 1953, 1957, 1975, 2004, 2024)	5 (1945, 1946, 1955, 2001, 2007)
Brazil	9 (1919*, 1922*, 1949*, 1989*, 1997, 1999, 2004, 2007, 2019*)	12 (1921, 1925, 1937, 1945, 1946, 1953, 1957, 1959, 1983, 1991, 1995, 2021*)	7 (1916, 1917, 1920, 1942, 1959, 1975, 1979)	3 (1923, 1956, 1963)
Paraguay	2 (1953, 1979)	6 (1922, 1929, 1947, 1949, 1963, 2011)	7 (1923, 1924, 1925, 1939, 1946, 1959, 1983)	7 (1921, 1926, 1937, 1942, 1967, 1989, 2015)
Chile	2 (2015*, 2016)	4 (1955*, 1956, 1979, 1987)	5 (1926*, 1941*, 1945*, 1967*, 1991*)	11 (1916, 1917, 1919, 1920, 1924, 1935, 1939, 1947, 1953, 1999, 2019)
Peru	2 (1939*, 1975)	1 (2019)	8 (1927*, 1935*, 1949, 1955, 1979, 1983, 2011, 2015)	6 (1929, 1941, 1957*, 1959, 1997, 2021)
Colombia	1 (2001*)	2 (1975, 2024)	5 (1987, 1993, 1995, 2016, 2021)	2 (1991, 2004)
Bolivia	1 (1963*)	1 (1997*)	0	2 (1927, 1949)
Mexico	0	2 (1993, 2001)	3 (1997, 1999, 2007)	0
Honduras	0	0	1 (2001)	0
Ecuador	0	0	0	2 (1959*, 1993)
United States	0	0	0	2 (1995, 2016*)
Venezuela	0	0	0	1 (2011)
Canada	0	0	0	1 (2024)

* = Host nation

== First trophy by nation ==
Among the 8 historical winners, 6 of them won Copa América for the first time when playing at home. The only exceptions are Uruguay (1916) and Paraguay (1953) – both winning their first title on a foreign soil though Uruguay won additionally at home one year later (1917).

Year	Host	Champion	Participating teams	Years after previous new champion	Copa Américas after previous new champion
1916	Argentina	Uruguay	4	–	–
1919	Brazil	Brazil	4	3	2
1921	Argentina	Argentina	4	2	2
1939	Peru	Peru	5	18	10
1953	Peru	Paraguay	7	14	7
1963	Bolivia	Bolivia	7	10	6
2001	Colombia	Colombia	12	38	12
2015	Chile	Chile	12	14	4

== Records and statistics ==
=== Copa América champions' results in the Confederations Cup ===
Qualified via	Team	Edition	Result
1991 Copa América	Argentina	1992	Champions
1993 Copa América	Argentina	1995	Runners-up
1995 Copa América	Uruguay	1997	Fourth place
1997 Copa América	Brazil	1999	Runners-up
1999 Copa América	Brazil	2001	Fourth place
2001 Copa América	Colombia	2003	Fourth place
2004 Copa América	Brazil	2005	Champions
2007 Copa América	Brazil	2009	Champions
2011 Copa América	Uruguay	2013	Fourth place
2015 Copa América	Chile	2017	Runners-up

=== Copa América champions' results in the Finalissima ===
Qualified via	Team	Edition	Result
1983 Copa América	Uruguay	1985	Runners-up
1993 Copa América	Argentina	1993	Champions
2021 Copa América	Argentina	2022	Champions
2024 Copa América	Argentina	2026	Cancelled

== Awards ==
There are currently five post-tournament awards

- the Best Player for most valuable player, first awarded in 1987;
- the Top Goalscorer for most prolific goal scorer;
- the Best Goalkeeper for most outstanding goalkeeper, first awarded in 2011;
- the Team of the Tournament for best combined team of players at the tournament;
- the Fair Play Award for the team with the best record of fair play, first awarded in 2011.

== See also ==
- Copa América Femenina
- Copa América Centenario
- Copa Centenario Revolución de Mayo
- Continental football championships
- Panamerican Championship
