= Julio Franzini =

Uruguayan public administrator and football executive

Ing. Julio César "Cholo" Franzini Molinari (November 5, 1926 – June 2, 2017) was a Uruguayan public administrator and association football executive.

Franzini earned a Bachelor's degree in Engineering from the University of Massachusetts in the United States in the 1950s. He contributed to the establishment of the first Uruguayan television channel, Saeta TV Channel 10. A member of the Colorado Party, he administered the Oceanographic and Fisheries Service (SOYP) in the 1960s, inaugurating the first fishing terminal in Uruguay, and was ambassador of Uruguay to Egypt in the late 1990s.

Franzini was the President of Defensor Sporting when the team were crowned champions in 1976, making them the first team other than Nacional and Peñarol to win the Uruguayan Championship.

He was President of the Uruguayan Football Association (Spanish: Asociación Uruguaya de Fútbol — AUF) between 1988 and 1989.

Preceded by Donato Griecco	Uruguayan Football Association; 1988–1989	Succeeded by Julio César Maglione
