= CONMEBOL Jubilee Awards =

Football award in South America

The CONMEBOL Jubilee Awards. The "South American Football Confederation" (CONMEBOL, or CSF; Spanish: Confederación Sudamericana de Fútbol; Portuguese: Confederação Sul-Americana de Futebol) is the continental governing body of football in South America, established in 1916.

== By Countries ==
- Argentina - Diego Armando Maradona
- Bolivia - Marco Etcheverry
- Brazil - Pelé
- Chile - Elías Figueroa
- Colombia - Carlos Valderrama
- Ecuador - Alberto Spencer
- Paraguay - Romerito
- (Peru) Perú - Teófilo Cubillas
- Uruguay - Enzo Francescoli
- Venezuela - Juan Arango *

(* on activity)
