= CONMEBOL =

International governing body for association football in South America

- South American Football Confederation

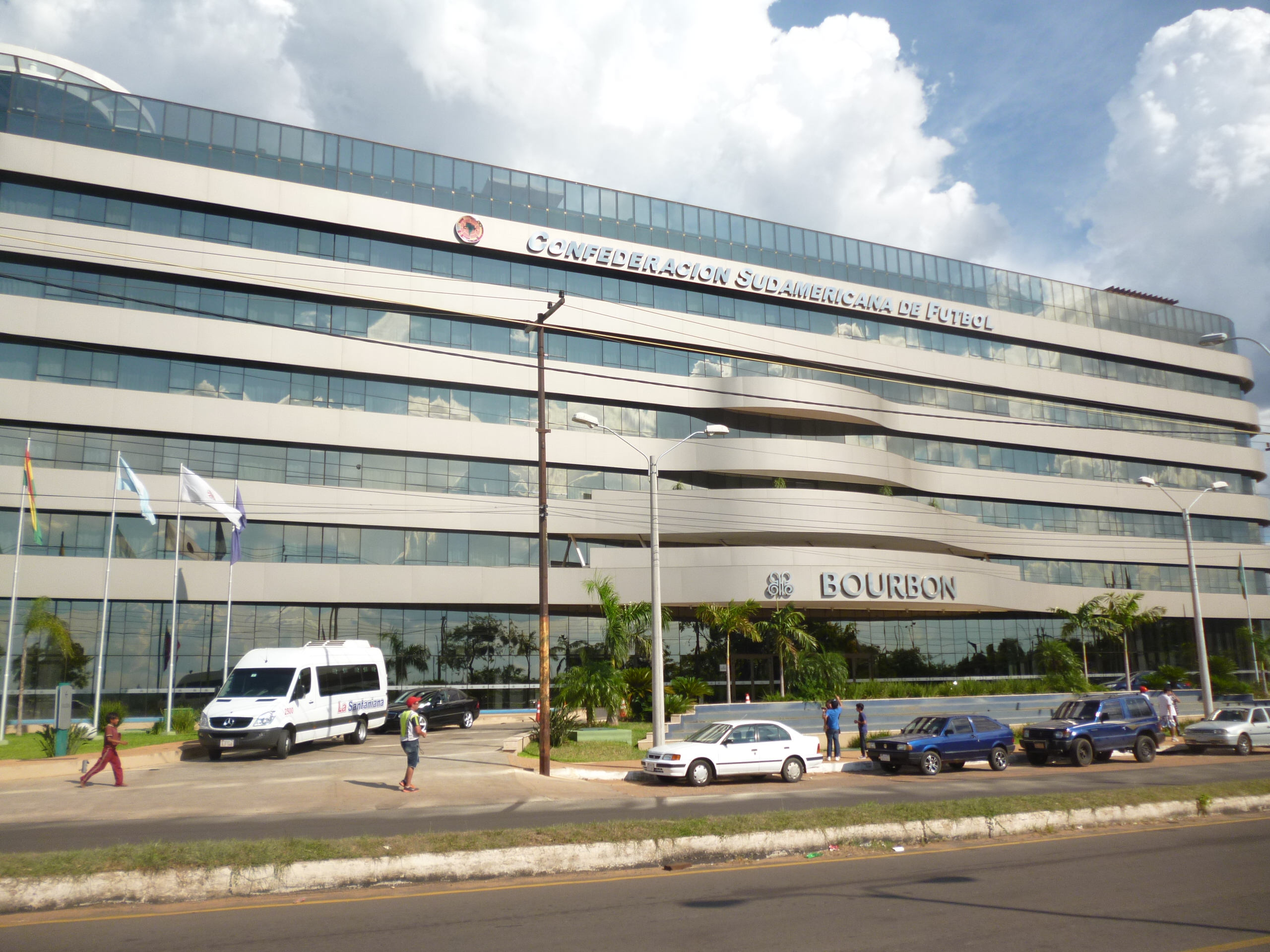
- CONMEBOL headquarters in Luque, Paraguay, as seen in 2014

- Abbreviation: CONMEBOL; CSF
- Formation: 9 July 1916; 110 years ago
- Founded at: Buenos Aires, Argentina
- Type: Sports organization
- Headquarters: Luque, Paraguay
- Coordinates: 25°15′38″S 57°30′58″W
- Region served: South America
- Members: 10 member associations
- Official languages: Portuguese; Spanish
- President: Alejandro Domínguez
- Vice President: Francisco Egas
- General Secretary: José Astigarraga
- Parent organization: FIFA
- Website: www.conmebol.com

CONMEBOL (Note: /ˈkɒnmɪbɒl/ KON-mib-ol) or CSF (Note: Spanish: Confederación Sudamericana de Fútbol Latin American Spanish pronunciation: [koɱfeðeɾaˈsjon suðameɾiˈkana ðe ˈfuðβol] Portuguese: Confederação Sul-Americana de Futebol Brazilian Portuguese pronunciation: [kõfedeɾaˈsɐ̃w ˌsuwɐmeɾiˈkɐnɐ dʒi futʃiˈbɔw] "CONMEBOL" is a portmanteau created from the official Spanish name: CONfederación SudaMEricana de FútBOL) (lit. 'South American Football Confederation') is the governing body of football in South America, and is responsible for organizing the continent's major international tournaments. It is the oldest of the six continental confederations of FIFA, and with 10 member associations, it has the fewest members of all the confederations. It is the only fully continental, land-based confederation, with no island members or members from other continents. (Note: For historical and cultural reasons, French Guiana, Guyana and Suriname are part of CONCACAF, not CONMEBOL.) CONMEBOL's headquarters are in Luque, Paraguay.

CONMEBOL national teams have won ten FIFA World Cups (Brazil five, Argentina three, and Uruguay two) and CONMEBOL clubs have won 22 Intercontinental Cups and four FIFA Club World Cups. Argentina, Brazil and Uruguay have won two Olympic gold medals each.

== History ==
In 1916, the first edition of the "Campeonato Sudamericano de Fútbol" (South-American Football Championship), later known as the "Copa América", was held in Argentina to commemorate the 100th anniversary of the Argentine Declaration of Independence. The four participating football associations—Argentina, Brazil, Chile and Uruguay—met in Buenos Aires to create a governing body for the tournament. CONMEBOL was founded on 9 July 1916. Its creation was ratified on 15 December of the same year, at the first Constitutional Congress in Montevideo. Over the years, six additional South American football associations joined CONMEBOL, the last of which was Venezuela in 1952.

== Leadership ==
=== Executive committee ===
Alejandro Domínguez of Paraguay has been the president of CONMEBOL since January 2016. The vice president is Francisco Egas of Ecuador, and the general secretary is José Astigarraga of Paraguay.

=== Past presidents ===
Period	Nationality	Name
1916–1936	Uruguay	Héctor Rivadavia Gómez
1936–1939	Argentina	Cornelius Johnson
1939–1955	Chile	Luis Valenzuela Hermosilla
1955–1957	Chile	Carlos Dittborn
1957–1959	Brazil	José Ramos de Freitas
1959–1961	Uruguay	Fermín Sorhueta
1961–1966	Argentina	Raúl H. Colombo
1966–1986	Peru	Teófilo Salinas Fuller
1986–2013	Paraguay	Nicolás Léoz
2013–2014	Uruguay	Eugenio Figueredo
2014–2015	Paraguay	Juan Ángel Napout
2015–2016	Uruguay	Wilmar Valdez (Note: Interim – two months.)
2016–present	Paraguay	Alejandro Domínguez

== Members ==
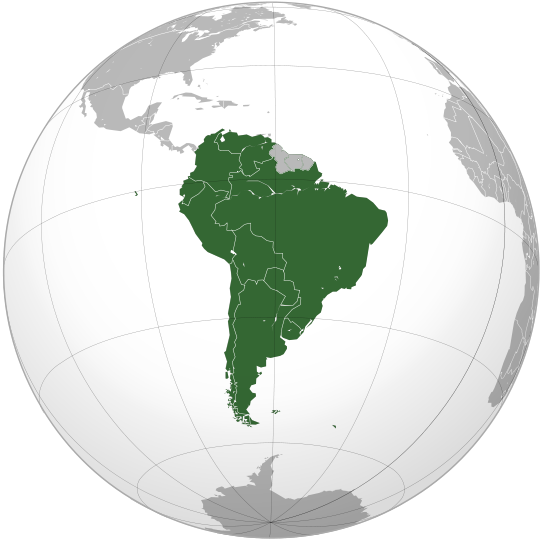
Countries that are members of CONMEBOL

Code	Association	Founded	FIFA affiliation	CONMEBOL affiliation	IOC member	National teams
ARG	Argentina	1893	1912	1916	Yes	Men's; U23; U20; U17; U15; F; BS; Women's; W U20; W U17; F
BOL	Bolivia	1925	1926	1926	Yes	Men's; U23; U20; U17; U15; F; BS; Women's; W U20; W U17; F
BRA	Brazil	1914	1923	1916	Yes	Men's; U23; U20; U17; U15; F; BS; Women's; W U20; W U17; F
CHI	Chile	1895	1913	1916	Yes	Men's; U23; U20; U17; U15; F; BS; Women's; W U20; W U17; F
COL	Colombia	1924	1936	1936	Yes	Men's; U23; U20; U17; U15; F; BS; Women's; W U20; W U17; F
ECU	Ecuador	1925	1926	1927	Yes	Men's; U23; U20; U17; U15; F; BS; Women's; W U20; W U17; F
PAR	Paraguay	1906	1925	1921	Yes	Men's; U23; U20; U17; U15; F; BS; Women's; W U20; W U17; F
PER	Peru	1922	1924	1925	Yes	Men's; U23; U20; U17; U15; F; BS; Women's; W U20; W U17; F
URU	Uruguay	1900	1923	1916	Yes	Men's; U23; U20; U17; U15; F; BS; Women's; W U20; W U17; F
VEN	Venezuela	1925	1952	1953	Yes	Men's; U23; U20; U17; U15; F; BS; Women's; W U20; W U17; F

=== Regional non-members ===
The following sovereign states and dependent territories in South America are not members of CONMEBOL. They are members of other confederations or are not affiliated with any confederation.

- Aruba (CONCACAF)
- Bonaire (CONCACAF)
- Curaçao (CONCACAF)
- Falkland Islands (Note: As Falkland Islanders are British citizens born abroad, they can choose to represent any of the four Home Nations or Argentina.)
- French Guiana (CONCACAF)
- Guyana (CONCACAF)
- Suriname (CONCACAF)
- Trinidad and Tobago (CONCACAF)
- South Georgia and the South Sandwich Islands

== List of CONMEBOL competitions ==
The most prestigious CONMEBOL competition for men's national teams is the Copa América, which was first held in 1916. CONMEBOL usually invites several teams from the AFC or CONCACAF to participate.

CONMEBOL organises the two top competitions for men's club teams in South America: the Copa Libertadores and the Copa Sudamericana. The Copa Sudamericana was launched in 2002 as a successor to the Supercopa Libertadores. A third competition, the Copa CONMEBOL, was founded in 1992 and was abolished in 1999. CONMEBOL runs the Copa Libertadores Femenina for women's club teams.

The Recopa Sudamericana is an annual match between the past year's winners of the Copa Libertadores and the winners of the Copa Sudamericana. The Intercontinental Cup was jointly organized with UEFA between the Copa Libertadores and the UEFA Champions League winners, and was discontinued in 2004.

Competitions contested by national teams

- Copa América
- CONMEBOL Men Pre-Olympic Tournament
- South American Under-20 Football Championship
- South American Under-17 Football Championship
- South American Under-15 Football Championship
- Copa América Femenina
- CONMEBOL Women's Nations League
- South American Under-20 Women's Football Championship
- South American Under-17 Women's Football Championship
- Copa América de Futsal
- South American Futsal League
- South American Under-20 Futsal Championship
- South American Under-17 Futsal Championship
- Copa América Femenina de Futsal
- South American Under-20 Women's Futsal Championship
- Copa América of Beach Soccer
- South American Beach Soccer League
- South American Under-20 Beach Soccer Championship
- Superclásico de las Américas

Competitions contested by clubs

- Copa Libertadores
- Copa Sudamericana
- Recopa Sudamericana
- Copa Libertadores Femenina
- Copa Libertadores de Futsal
- Copa Libertadores Femenina de Futsal
- Copa Libertadores de Fútbol Playa
- U-20 Copa Libertadores

Intercontinental competitions

- CONMEBOL–UEFA Cup of Champions
- UEFA–CONMEBOL Club Challenge
- Women's Finalissima
- Futsal Finalissima
- Under-20 Intercontinental Cup

Defunct competitions

- Supercopa Libertadores
- Copa CONMEBOL
- South American Championship of Champions
- Copa Ganadores de Copa
- Copa de Oro
- Copa Mercosur
- Copa Merconorte
- Copa Master de Supercopa
- Copa Master de CONMEBOL
- FIFA Futsal World Cup qualifiers
- FIFA Beach Soccer World Cup qualifiers
- J.League Cup / Copa Sudamericana Championship
- Intercontinental Champions' Supercup
- Copa Interamericana
- Copa Iberoamericana
- Intercontinental Cup

=== Current title holders ===
Competition	Year	Champions	Title	Runners-up	Next edition
Intercontinental (CONMEBOL–UEFA)
Finalissima	2022	Argentina	2nd	Italy	2026
Women's Finalissima	2023	England	1st	Brazil	2027
Club Challenge	2023	(Spain) Sevilla	1st	(Ecuador) Independiente del Valle	2024
Under-20 Intercontinental Cup	2025	(Brazil) Flamengo	2nd	(Spain) Barcelona	2026
Futsal Finalissima	2022	Portugal	1st	Spain	2026
Men's national teams
Copa América	2024 (final)	Argentina	16th	Colombia	2028 (final)
Pre-Olympic Tournament	2024	Paraguay	2nd	Argentina	2028
U-20 Championship	2025	Brazil	13th	Argentina	2027
U-17 Championship	2026	Colombia	2nd	Argentina	2027
U-15 Championship	2026	Brazil	7th	Paraguay	
Copa América de Futsal	2026	Brazil	12th	Argentina	2028
U-17 Futsal Championship	2024	Argentina	2nd	Brazil	
U-20 Futsal Championship	2024	Argentina	2nd	Colombia	
Copa América de Beach Soccer	2025	Brazil	4th	Paraguay	2027
Beach Soccer League	2023	Paraguay	2nd	Brazil	2024
U-20 Beach Soccer Championship	2023	Paraguay	1st	Brazil	2026
Women's national teams
Copa América Femenina	2025 (final)	Brazil	9th	Colombia	2029 (final)
CONMEBOL Women's Nations League	2025-26	Colombia	1st	Argentina	
U-20 Women's Championship	2026	Brazil	11th	Ecuador	
U-17 Women's Championship	2026	Brazil	6th	Argentina	2027
U-15 Girl's Evolution League	2026	Venezuela	1st	Paraguay	
Copa América Femenina de Futsal	2025	Brazil	8th	Argentina	2026
U-20 Women's Futsal Championship	2024	Colombia	1st	Brazil	2026
Men's club teams
Recopa Sudamericana	2026 (FL), (SL)	(Argentina) Lanús	1st	(Brazil) Flamengo	2027 (FL), (SL)
Copa Libertadores	2025 (final)	(Brazil) Flamengo	4th	(Brazil) Palmeiras	2026 (final)
Copa Sudamericana	2025 (final)	(Argentina) Lanús	2nd	(Brazil) Atlético Mineiro	2026 (final)
U-20 Copa Libertadores	2026 (final)	(Chile) Santiago Wanderers	1st	(Brazil) Flamengo	2027 (final)
Copa Libertadores de Futsal	2025 (final)	(Uruguay) Peñarol	1st	(Brazil) Magnus Futsal	2026 (final)
Copa Libertadores de Fútbol Playa	2024 (final)	(Brazil) Vasco da Gama	4th	(Paraguay) Sportivo Luqueño	2025 (final)
Women's club teams
Copa Libertadores Femenina	2025 (final)	(Brazil) Corinthians	6th	(Colombia) Deportivo Cali	2026 (final)
Copa Libertadores Femenina de Futsal	2024 (final)	(Brazil) Stein Cascavel	2nd	(Argentina) Racing	2025 (final)

== FIFA World Rankings ==
=== Overview ===
FIFA Men's Rankings (as of 7 October 2026)
CONMEBOL*	FIFA	±	National Team	Points
1	2	Steady	Argentina	1972.8
2	6	▼1	Brazil	1806.51
3	11	Steady	Colombia	1735.8
4	20	Steady	Uruguay	1635.54
5	24	▲1	Ecuador	1587.07
6	33	▲1	Paraguay	1552.3
7	49	▼2	Venezuela	1465.87
8	50	▼1	Chile	1458.97
9	53	▼3	Peru	1450.95
10	78	▼1	Bolivia	1322.19
*Local rankings based on FIFA ranking points

FIFA Women's Rankings (as of 16 June 2026)
CONMEBOL*	FIFA	±	National Team	Points
1	7	▼1	Brazil	1976.73
2	20	Steady	Colombia	1775.96
3	30	Steady	Argentina	1683
4	42	▲1	Venezuela	1527
5	44	▲1	Paraguay	1511.01
6	48	▼4	Chile	1487
7	61	▲2	Ecuador	1418.82
8	62	▼1	Uruguay	1418.66
9	73	▲2	Peru	1331.32
10	112	▼3	Bolivia	1153.64
*Local rankings based on FIFA ranking points

=== Team of the year ===
Men's teams ranking in the top four
Year	First	Second	Third	Fourth
1993	Brazil	Argentina	Uruguay	Colombia
1994	Brazil	Argentina	Colombia	Uruguay
1995	Brazil	Argentina	Colombia	Uruguay
1996	Brazil	Colombia	Argentina	Chile
1997	Brazil	Colombia	Chile	Argentina
1998	Brazil	Argentina	Chile	Paraguay
1999	Brazil	Argentina	Paraguay	Chile
2000	Brazil	Argentina	Paraguay	Colombia
2001	Argentina	Brazil	Colombia	Paraguay
2002	Brazil	Argentina	Paraguay	Uruguay
2003	Brazil	Argentina	Uruguay	Paraguay
2004	Brazil	Argentina	Uruguay	Colombia
2005	Brazil	Argentina	Uruguay	Colombia
2006	Brazil	Argentina	Uruguay	Ecuador
2007	Argentina	Brazil	Colombia	Paraguay
2008	Brazil	Argentina	Paraguay	Uruguay
2009	Brazil	Argentina	Chile	Uruguay
2010	Brazil	Argentina	Uruguay	Chile
2011	Uruguay	Brazil	Argentina	Chile
2012	Argentina	Colombia	Ecuador	Uruguay
2013	Argentina	Colombia	Uruguay	Brazil
2014	Argentina	Colombia	Brazil	Uruguay
2015	Argentina	Chile	Brazil	Colombia
2016	Argentina	Brazil	Chile	Colombia
2017	Brazil	Argentina	Chile	Peru
2018	Brazil	Uruguay	Argentina	Colombia
2019	Brazil	Uruguay	Argentina	Colombia
2020	Brazil	Argentina	Uruguay	Colombia
2021	Brazil	Argentina	Colombia	Uruguay
2022	Brazil	Argentina	Uruguay	Colombia
2023	Argentina	Brazil	Uruguay	Colombia
2024	Argentina	Brazil	Uruguay	Colombia
2025	Argentina	Brazil	Colombia	Uruguay

Women's teams ranking in the top four
Year	First	Second	Third	Fourth
2003	Brazil	Colombia	Argentina	Peru
2004	Brazil	Colombia	Argentina	Peru
2005	Brazil	Peru	Argentina	Colombia
2006	Brazil	Argentina	Peru	Colombia
2007	Brazil	Argentina	Peru	Colombia
2008	Brazil	Argentina	Ecuador	Paraguay
2009	Brazil	Argentina	Colombia	Peru
2010	Brazil	Argentina	Colombia	Chile
2011	Brazil	Colombia	Argentina	Chile
2012	Brazil	Colombia	Argentina	Chile
2013	Brazil	Colombia	Uruguay	
2014	Brazil	Colombia	Argentina	Chile
2015	Brazil	Colombia	Argentina	Chile
2016	Brazil	Colombia	Venezuela	
2017	Brazil	Colombia	Argentina	Chile
2018	Brazil	Colombia	Argentina	Chile
2019	Brazil	Colombia	Argentina	Chile
2020	Brazil	Colombia	Argentina	Chile
2021	Brazil	Colombia	Argentina	Chile
2022	Brazil	Colombia	Argentina	Chile
2023	Brazil	Colombia	Argentina	Chile
2024	Brazil	Colombia	Argentina	Chile
2025	Brazil	Colombia	Argentina	Venezuela

== Other rankings ==
=== Clubs ===
==== Football Database rankings ====
Rank	Club	Points
12	(Brazil) Flamengo	1886
30	(Brazil) Palmeiras	1766
46	(Brazil) Fluminense	1719
52	(Argentina) Racing Club	1711
55	(Ecuador) LDU Quito	1703
59	(Brazil) Botafogo	1699
62	(Brazil) Cruzeiro	1690
68	(Argentina) Boca Juniors	1681
73	(Brazil) Mirassol	1676
82	(Uruguay) Peñarol	1649

Last updated: 11 January 2026

==== IFFHS ====
Zonal Ranking	IFFHS Ranking	Club	Points
1	8	(Brazil) Flamengo	400
2	9	(Brazil) Palmeiras	378
3	14	(Brazil) Fluminense	314
4	24	(Brazil) Botafogo	264
5	36	(Argentina) Racing Club	234
6	39	(Colombia) Atlético Nacional	229,5
7	44	(Ecuador) LDU Quito	216,5
8	45	(Brazil) Atlético Mineiro	216
9	48	(Argentina) River Plate	210
10	49	(Argentina) Lanús	208

Last updated on: 13 December 2025 –

=== Beach soccer national teams ===
Men's national teams BSWW Rankings (out of 93 nations)
Rank	Nation	Points
1	Brazil	4697.25
10	Paraguay	1327.5
14	Colombia	958.75
17	Argentina	798.5
18	Chile	786
23	Venezuela	644.75
32	Uruguay	422
42	Peru	262.75
47	Ecuador	217.75
49	Bolivia	214.25

Men's update: 19 January 2026.

== Major tournament records ==
Legend

- 1st – Champion
- 2nd – Runner-up
- 3rd – Third place
- 4th – Fourth place
- QF – Quarter-finals (1934–1938, 1954–1970, and 1986–present: knockout round of 8)
- R3 – Round 3 (2026–present: knockout round of 16)
- R2 – Round 2 (1974–1978: second group stage, top 8; 1982: second group stage, top 12; 1986–2022: knockout round of 16; 2026–present: knockout round of 32)
- R1 – Round 1 (1930, 1950–1970 and 1986–present: group stage; 1934–1938: knockout round of 16; 1974–1982: first group stage)
- Q – Qualified for upcoming tournament
- •• – Qualified but withdrew
- • – Did not qualify
- – Did not enter / Withdrew / Banned
- – Hosts

For each tournament, the flag of the host country and the number of teams in each finals tournament (in brackets) are shown.

=== FIFA World Cup ===
FIFA World Cup record
Team	1930 (Uruguay) (13)	1934 (Italy) (16)	1938 (France) (15)	1950 (Brazil) (13)	1954 (Switzerland) (16)	1958 (Sweden) (16)	1962 (Chile) (16)	1966 (England) (16)	1970 (Mexico) (16)	1974 (West Germany) (16)	1978 (Argentina) (16)	1982 (Spain) (24)	1986 (Mexico) (24)	1990 (Italy) (24)	1994 (United States) (24)	1998 (France) (32)	2002 (Japan) (South Korea) (32)	2006 (Germany) (32)	2010 (South Africa) (32)	2014 (Brazil) (32)	2018 (Russia) (32)	2022 (Qatar) (32)	2026 (Canada) (Mexico) (United States) (48)	Years
CONMEBOL qualifier	/	1934	1938	1950	1954	1958	1962	1966	1970	1974	1978	1982	1986	1990	1994	1998	2002	2006	2010	2014	2018	2022	2026	
Argentina	2nd	R1				R1	R1	QF	•	R2	1st	R2	1st	2nd	R2	QF	R1	QF	QF	2nd	R2	1st	2nd	19
Bolivia	R1			R1		•	•	•	•	•	•	•	•	•	R1	•	•	•	•	•	•	•	•	3
Brazil	R1	R1	3rd	2nd	QF	1st	1st	R1	1st	4th	3rd	R2	QF	R2	1st	2nd	1st	QF	QF	4th	QF	QF	R3	23
Chile	R1			R1	•	•	3rd	R1	•	R1	•	R1	•	•		R2	•	•	R2	R2	•	•	•	9
Colombia						•	R1	•	•	•	•	•	•	R2	R1	R1	•	•	•	QF	R2	•	R3	7
Ecuador							•	•	•	•	•	•	•	•	•	•	R1	R2	•	R1	•	R1	R2	5
Paraguay	R1			R1	•	R1	•	•	•	•	•	•	R2	•	•	R2	R2	R1	QF	•	•	•	R3	9
Peru	R1					•	•	•	QF	•	R2	R1	•	•	•	•	•	•	•	•	R1	•	•	5
Uruguay	1st			1st	4th	•	R1	QF	4th	R1	•	•	R2	R2	•	•	R1	•	4th	R2	QF	R1	R1	15
Venezuela								•	•		•	•	•	•	•	•	•	•	•	•	•	•	•	0
Total (10 teams)	7	2	1	5	2	3	5	4	3	4	3	4	4	4	4	5	5	4	5	6	5	4	6	95

=== FIFA Women's World Cup ===
FIFA Women's World Cup record
Team	1991 (China) (12)	1995 (Sweden) (12)	1999 (United States) (16)	2003 (United States) (16)	2007 (China) (16)	2011 (Germany) (16)	2015 (Canada) (24)	2019 (France) (24)	2023 (Australia) (New Zealand) (32)	2027 (Brazil) (32)	Years
Argentina		•	•	R1	R1	•	•	R1	R1	Q	5
Bolivia		•	•	•	•	•	•	•	•	•	0
Brazil	R1	R1	3rd	QF	2nd	QF	R2	R2	R1	Q	10
Chile	•	•	•	•	•	•	•	R1	•	•	1
Colombia			•	•	•	R1	R2	•	QF	Q	4
Ecuador		•	•	•	•	•	R1	•	•		1
Paraguay			•	•	•	•	•	•	•	•	0
Peru			•	•	•	•	•	•	•	•	0
Uruguay			•	•	•	•	•	•	•	•	0
Venezuela	•		•	•	•	•	•	•	•		0
Total (5 teams)	1	1	1	2	2	2	3	3	3	3–5	

=== Olympic Games ===
==== Men's tournament ====
Olympic Games (Men's tournament) record
Team	1900 (France) (3)	1904 (United States) (3)	1908 (United Kingdom) (6)	1912 (Sweden) (11)	1920 (Belgium) (14)	1924 (France) (22)	1928 (Netherlands) (17)	1936 (Germany) (16)	1948 (United Kingdom) (18)	1952 (Finland) (25)	1956 (Australia) (11)	1960 (Italy) (16)	1964 (Japan) (14)	1968 (Mexico) (16)	1972 (West Germany) (16)	1976 (Canada) (13)	1980 (Soviet Union) (16)	1984 (United States) (16)	1988 (South Korea) (16)	1992 (Spain) (16)	1996 (United States) (16)	2000 (Australia) (16)	2004 (Greece) (16)	2008 (China) (16)	2012 (United Kingdom) (16)	2016 (Brazil) (16)	2020 (Japan) (16)	2024 (France) (16)	Years
Argentina	–	–	–	–	–	–	2	–	–	–	–	7	10	–	–	–	–	–	8	–	2	–	1	1	–	11	10	7	10
Brazil	–	–	–	–	–	–	–	–	–	5	–	6	9	13	13	4	–	2	2	–	3	7	–	3	2	1	1	–	14
Chile	–	–	–	–	–	–	17	–	–	17	–	–	–	–	–	–	–	7	–	–	–	3	–	–	–	–	–	–	4
Colombia	–	–	–	–	–	–	–	–	–	–	–	–	–	10	11	–	11	–	–	14	–	–	–	–	–	6	–	–	5
Paraguay	–	–	–	–	–	–	–	–	–	–	–	–	–	–	–	–	–	–	–	7	–	–	2	–	–	–	–	6	3
Peru	–	–	–	–	–	–	–	5	–	–	–	11	–	–	–	–	–	–	–	–	–	–	–	–	–	–	–	–	2
Uruguay	–	–	–	–	–	1	1	–	–	–	–	–	–	–	–	–	–	–	–	–	–	–	–	–	9	–	–	–	3
Venezuela	–	–	–	–	–	–	–	–	–	–	–	–	–	–	–	–	12	–	–	–	–	–	–	–	–	–	–	–	1
Total (8 teams)	0	0	0	0	0	1	3	1	0	2	0	3	2	2	2	1	2	2	2	2	2	2	2	2	2	3	2	2	

==== Women's tournament ====
Olympic Games (Women's tournament) record
Team	1996 (United States) (8)	2000 (Australia) (8)	2004 (Greece) (10)	2008 (China) (12)	2012 (United Kingdom) (12)	2016 (Brazil) (12)	2020 (Japan) (12)	2024 (France) (12)	2028 (United States) (16)	Years
Argentina	–	–	–	=11	–	–	–	–	–	1
Brazil	4	4	2	2	6	4	6	2	Q	9
Chile	–	–	–	–	–	–	11	–	–	1
Colombia	–	–	–	–	11	11	–	8	Q	4
Total (4 teams)	1	1	1	2	2	2	2	2	2	

=== Copa América Femenina ===
Copa América Femenina record
Team (Total 10 teams)	1991 (Brazil) (3)	1995 (Brazil) (5)	1998 (Argentina) (10)	2003 (Peru) (10)	2006 (Argentina) (10)	2010 (Ecuador) (10)	2014 (Ecuador) (10)	2018 (Chile) (10)	2022 (Colombia) (10)	2025 (Ecuador) (10)	Years
Argentina	—	2nd	2nd	2nd	1st	4th	4th	3rd	3rd	3rd	9
Bolivia	—	5th	GS	GS	GS	GS	GS	GS	GS	GS	9
Brazil	1st	1st	1st	1st	2nd	1st	1st	1st	1st	1st	10
Chile	2nd	3rd	GS	GS	GS	3rd	GS	2nd	5th	6th	10
Colombia	—	—	GS	3rd	GS	2nd	2nd	4th	2nd	2nd	8
Ecuador	—	4th	4th	GS	GS	GS	3rd	GS	GS	GS	9
Paraguay	—	—	GS	GS	4th	GS	GS	GS	4th	5th	8
Peru	—	—	3rd	4th	GS	GS	GS	GS	GS	GS	8
Uruguay	—	—	GS	GS	3rd	GS	GS	GS	GS	4th	8
Venezuela	3rd	—	GS	GS	GS	GS	GS	GS	6th	GS	9

=== FIFA U-20 World Cup ===
FIFA U-20 World Cup record
Team	1977 (Tunisia) (16)	1979 (Japan) (16)	1981 (Australia) (16)	1983 (Mexico) (16)	1985 (Soviet Union) (16)	1987 (Chile) (16)	1989 (Saudi Arabia) (16)	1991 (Portugal) (16)	1993 (Australia) (16)	1995 (Qatar) (16)	1997 (Malaysia) (24)	1999 (Nigeria) (24)	2001 (Argentina) (24)	2003 (United Arab Emirates) (24)	2005 (Netherlands) (24)	2007 (Canada) (24)	2009 (Egypt) (24)	2011 (Colombia) (24)	2013 (Turkey) (24)	2015 (New Zealand) (24)	2017 (South Korea) (24)	2019 (Poland) (24)	2023 (Argentina) (24)	2025 (Chile) (24)	Years
Argentina	•	1st	R1	2nd	•	•	QF	R1	•	1st	1st	R2	1st	4th	1st	1st	•	QF	•	R1	R1	R2	QF	2nd	18
Brazil	3rd	•	QF	1st	1st	QF	3rd	2nd	1st	2nd	QF	QF	QF	1st	3rd	R2	2nd	1st	•	2nd	•	•	QF	R1	20
Chile	•	•	•	•	•	4th	•	•	•	R1	•	•	R1	•	R2	3rd	•	•	QF	•	•	•	•	R2	7
Colombia	•	•	•	•	QF	R1	QF	•	R1	•	•	•	•	3rd	R2	•	•	QF	R2	R2	•	QF	QF	3rd	12
Ecuador	•	•	•	•	•	•	•	•	•	•	•	•	R2	•	•	•	•	R2	•	•	R1	3rd	R2	•	5
Paraguay	R1	QF	•	•	R1	•	•	•	•	•	R1	R2	4th	R2	•	•	R2	•	R2	•	•	•	•	R2	10
Uruguay	4th	3rd	QF	QF	•	•	•	R1	QF	•	2nd	4th	•	•	•	R2	R2	R1	2nd	R2	4th	R2	1st	•	16
Venezuela	•	•	•	•	•	•	•	•	•	•	•	•	•	•	•	•	R2	•	•	•	2nd	•	•	•	2
Total (8 teams)	3	3	3	3	3	3	3	3	3	3	4	4	5	4	4	4	4	5	4	4	4	4	5	5	

=== FIFA U-20 Women's World Cup ===
FIFA U-20 Women's World Cup record
Team	2002 (Canada) (12)	2004 (Thailand) (12)	2006 (Russia) (16)	2008 (Chile) (16)	2010 (Germany) (16)	2012 (Japan) (16)	2014 (Canada) (16)	2016 (Papua New Guinea) (16)	2018 (France) (16)	2022 (Costa Rica) (16)	2024 (Colombia) (24)	2026 (Poland) (24)	Years
Argentina	•	•	R1	R1	•	R1	•	•	•	•	R2	R2	5
Brazil	4th	4th	3rd	QF	R1	R1	R1	QF	R1	3rd	QF	QF	12
Chile	•	•	•	R1	•	•	•	•	•	•	•	•	1
Colombia	•	•	•	•	4th	•	•	•	•	QF	QF	3rd	4
Ecuador	•	•	•	•	•	•	•	•	•	•	•	R1	1
Paraguay	•	•	•	•	•	•	R1	•	R1	•	R1	•	3
Venezuela	•	•	•	•	•	•	•	R1	•	•	R1	•	2
Total (7 teams)	1	1	2	3	2	2	2	2	2	2	5	4	28

=== FIFA U-17 World Cup ===
FIFA U-17 World Cup record
Team	1985 (China) (16)	1987 (Canada) (16)	1989 (Scotland) (16)	1991 (Italy) (16)	1993 (Japan) (16)	1995 (Ecuador) (16)	1997 (Egypt) (16)	1999 (New Zealand) (16)	2001 (Trinidad and Tobago) (16)	2003 (Finland) (16)	2005 (Peru) (16)	2007 (South Korea) (24)	2009 (Nigeria) (24)	2011 (Mexico) (24)	2013 (United Arab Emirates) (24)	2015 (Chile) (24)	2017 (India) (24)	2019 (Brazil) (24) (Note: Original hosts Peru were stripped of the right to host the 2019 event in February 2019.)	2023 (Indonesia) (24)	2025 (Qatar) (48)	2026 (Qatar) (48)	Years
Argentina	R1	•	QF	3rd	R1	3rd	QF	•	4th	3rd	•	QF	R2	R2	4th	R1	•	R2	4th	R2	Q	17
Bolivia	R1	R1	•	•	•	•	•	•	•	•	•	•	•	•	•	•	•	•	•	R1	•	3
Brazil	3rd	R1	QF	QF	•	2nd	1st	1st	QF	1st	2nd	R2	R1	4th	QF	QF	3rd	1st	QF	4th	Q	20
Chile	•	•	•	•	3rd	•	R1	•	•	•	•	•	•	•	•	R2	R1	R2	•	R1	Q	7
Colombia	•	•	R1	•	R1	•	•	•	•	4th	•	R2	4th	•	•	•	R2	•	•	R2	Q	8
Ecuador	•	R1	•	•	•	QF	•	•	•	•	•	•	•	R2	•	QF	•	R2	R2	•	Q	7
Paraguay	•	•	•	•	•	•	•	QF	R1	•	•	•	•	•	•	R1	R2	QF	•	R2	•	6
Peru	•	•	•	•	•	•	•	•	•	•	R1	QF	•	•	•	•	•	•	•	•	•	2
Uruguay	•	•	•	R1	•	•	•	QF	•	•	R1	•	QF	2nd	QF	•	•	•	•	•	Q	7
Venezuela	•	•	•	•	•	•	•	•	•	•	•	•	•	•	R1	•	•	•	R2	R2	Q	4
Total (10 teams)	3	3	3	3	3	3	3	3	3	3	3	4	4	4	4	5	4	5	4	7	7	

=== FIFA U-17 Women's World Cup ===
FIFA U-17 Women's World Cup record
Team	2008 (New Zealand) (16)	2010 (Trinidad and Tobago) (16)	2012 (Azerbaijan) (16)	2014 (Costa Rica) (16)	2016 (Jordan) (16)	2018 (Uruguay) (16)	2022 (India) (16)	2024 (Dominican Republic) (16)	2025 (Morocco) (24)	2026 (Morocco) (24)	Years
Argentina	•	•	•	•	•	•	•	•	•	Q	1
Brazil	R1	QF	QF	•	R1	R1	QF	R1	4th	Q	9
Chile	•	R1	•	•	•	•	R1	•	•	Q	3
Colombia	R1	•	R1	R1	•	R1	2nd	R1	R2	•	7
Ecuador	•	•	•	•	•	•	•	QF	R1	•	2
Paraguay	R1	•	•	R1	R1	•	•	•	R2	•	4
Uruguay	•	•	R1	•	•	R1	•	•	•	•	2
Venezuela	•	R1	•	4th	4th	•	•	•	•	Q	4
Total (8 teams)	3	3	3	3	3	3	3	3	4	4	32

=== FIFA Futsal World Cup ===
FIFA Futsal World Cup record
Team	1989 (Netherlands) (16)	1992 (Hong Kong) (16)	1996 (Spain) (16)	2000 (Guatemala) (16)	2004 (Taiwan) (16)	2008 (Brazil) (20)	2012 (Thailand) (24)	2016 (Colombia) (24)	2021 (Lithuania) (24)	2024 (Uzbekistan) (24)	Years
Argentina	R2	R2	R1	R2	4th	R2	QF	1st	2nd	2nd	10
Brazil	1st	1st	1st	2nd	3rd	1st	1st	R2	3rd	1st	10
Colombia							4th	R2			2
Paraguay	R2	R1			R1	R2	R2	QF	R2	QF	8
Uruguay			R2	R1		R1					3
Venezuela									R2	QF	2
Total (6 teams)	3	3	3	3	3	4	4	4	4	4	

=== FIFA Beach Soccer World Cup ===
FIFA Beach Soccer World Cup record
Team	1995 (Brazil) (8)	1996 (Brazil) (8)	1997 (Brazil) (8)	1998 (Brazil) (10)	1999 (Brazil) (12)	2000 (Brazil) (12)	2001 (Brazil) (12)	2002 (Brazil) (8)	2003 (Brazil) (8)	2004 (Brazil) (12)	2005 (Brazil) (12)	2006 (Brazil) (12)	2007 (Brazil) (16)	2008 (France) (16)	2009 (United Arab Emirates) (16)	2011 (Italy) (16)	2013 (French Polynesia) (16)	2015 (Portugal) (16)	2017 (The Bahamas) (16)	2019 (Paraguay) (16)	2021 (Russia) (16)	2024 (United Arab Emirates) (16)	2025 (Seychelles) (16)	Years
Argentina	R1; 7th	R1; 8th	4th	R1; 8th	•	R1; 10th	3rd	R1; 8th	•	QF; 7th	QF; 8th	QF; 5th	R1; 11th	QF; 5th	R1; 9th	R1; 11th	QF; 8th	R1; 12th	•	•	•	R1; 11th	•	17/23
Brazil	1st	1st	1st	1st	1st	1st	4th	1st	1st	1st	3rd	1st	1st	1st	1st	2nd	3rd	QF; 5th	1st	QF; 5th	QF; 5th	1st	1st	23/23
Chile	•	•	•	R1; 9th	•	•	•	•	•	•	•	•	•	•	•	•	•	•	•	•	•	•	R1	1/23
Colombia	×	×	×	×	×	×	×	×	×	×	•	•	•	•	•	•	•	•	•	•	•	R1; 15th	•	1/23
Ecuador	•	•	•	•	•	•	•	•	•	•	•	•	•	•	•	•	•	•	R1; 16th	•	•	•	•	1/23
Paraguay	•	•	•	•	•	•	•	•	•	•	•	•	•	•	•	•	R1; 9th	R1; 11th	QF; 7th	R1; 10th	R1; 9th	•	R1	6/23
Peru	•	•	•	4th	4th	2nd	QF; 7th	•	•	R1; 9th	•	•	•	•	•	•	•	•	•	•	•	•	•	5/23
Uruguay	R1; 6th	2nd	2nd	3rd	3rd	R1; 9th	R1; 11th	3rd	R1; 5th	QF; 6th	QF; 5th	2nd	3rd	QF; 7th	4th	•	•	•	•	QF; 7th	QF; 8th	•	•	17/23
Venezuela	•	•	•	•	•	QF; 5th	R1; 9th	•	•	•	•	•	•	•	•	R1; 16th	•	•	•	•	•	•	•	3/23
Total (9 teams)	3	3	3	5	3	5	5	3	2	4	3	3	3	3	3	3	3	3	3	3	3	3	3	

=== Former tournaments ===
==== FIFA Confederations Cup ====
FIFA Confederations Cup record
Team	1992 (Saudi Arabia) (4)	1995 (Saudi Arabia) (6)	1997 (Saudi Arabia) (8)	1999 (Mexico) (8)	2001 (South Korea) (Japan) (8)	2003 (France) (8)	2005 (Germany) (8)	2009 (South Africa) (8)	2013 (Brazil) (8)	2017 (Russia) (8)	Years
Argentina	1st	2nd	•	•	•	×	2nd	•	•	•	3
Bolivia	•	•	•	GS	•	•	•	•	•	•	1
Brazil	•	×	1st	2nd	4th	GS	1st	1st	1st	•	7
Chile	•	•	•	•	•	•	•	•	•	2nd	1
Colombia	•	•	•	•	•	4th	•	•	•	•	1
Uruguay	•	•	4th	•	•	•	•	•	4th	•	2
Total (6 teams)	1	1	2	2	1	2	2	1	2	1	

== Corruption ==
On 27 May 2015, several CONMEBOL leaders were arrested in Zürich, Switzerland by Swiss police and indicted by the U.S. Department of Justice on charges of corruption, money laundering, and racketeering. Those swept up in the operation include former CONMEBOL presidents Eugenio Figueredo and Nicolás Léoz, as well as the football administrators Carlos Chávez and Sergio Jadue. On 3 December 2015, CONMEBOL President Juan Ángel Napout was also arrested.

== See also ==
- CONMEBOL Jubilee Awards
- International Federation of Association Football (FIFA)
- Union of European Football Associations (UEFA)
- Confederation of North, Central American and Caribbean Association Football (CONCACAF)
- Confederation of African Football (CAF)
- Asian Football Confederation (AFC)
- Oceania Football Confederation (OFC)
