= Héctor Rivadavia Gómez =

Héctor Rivadavia Gomez
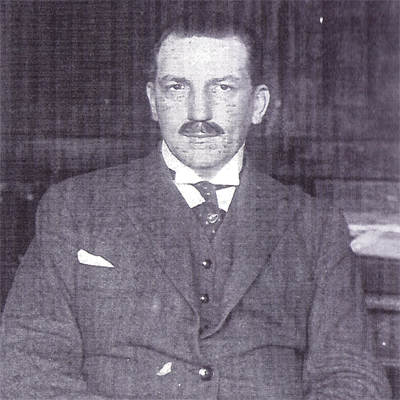
- Born: 1880; Dolores, Uruguay
- Died: 1931 (aged 50–51); Montevideo, Uruguay
- Occupations: Journalist, politician, football administrator
- Notable work: CONMEBOL

Héctor Rivadavia Gomez (Dolores, Uruguay, 1880 – Montevideo, 1931) was a Uruguayan journalist, politician, and football director of the Uruguayan Football Association. He was the creator and first president of the CONMEBOL (and then honorary president). Rivadavia Gómez also encouraged the creation of the South American championships, currently known as "Copa América".

== Biography ==
As a journalist, Rivadavia Gómez made a career as chief of section in El Día newspaper. He also directed El Telégrafo and founded other daily newspapers, La Mañana and El Diario.

His political career started as deputy of Colorado Party representing Canelones Department from 1908 to 1914. He also represented Montevideo from 1923 to 1926. Rivadavia Gómez also worked in the Uruguayan Government, being in charge of the National Post Office of Uruguay.

He represented Uruguayan Football Association (AUF), achieving Uruguay was elected as host of the first FIFA World Cup in 1930. He presided over the AUF (1907–12) and club Montevideo Wanderers (1915–19, 1923).

Rivadavia Gómez was responsible for first proposing the idea of a South American football confederation, the origins of CONMEBOL. An old personal project of him, it became a distinct possibility during the first South American championship held in Buenos Aires between July 2 and July 17, 1916, as part of the commemorations of Argentina's Independence centenary.

On July 9, 1916, (the exact day of the 100th anniversary of Argentine Declaration of Independence), the football leaders of Argentina, Brazil, Chile and Uruguay met in Buenos Aires to study his idea, which was approved ad-referendum by each of the national associations.

Preceded by Jorge Clulow	Uruguayan Football Association; 1907-1912	Succeeded by Abelardo Véscovi
Preceded by Atilio Narancio	Uruguayan Football Association; 1926	Succeeded by Raúl Jude
