= Alejandro Domínguez (football executive) =

Paraguayan football administrator

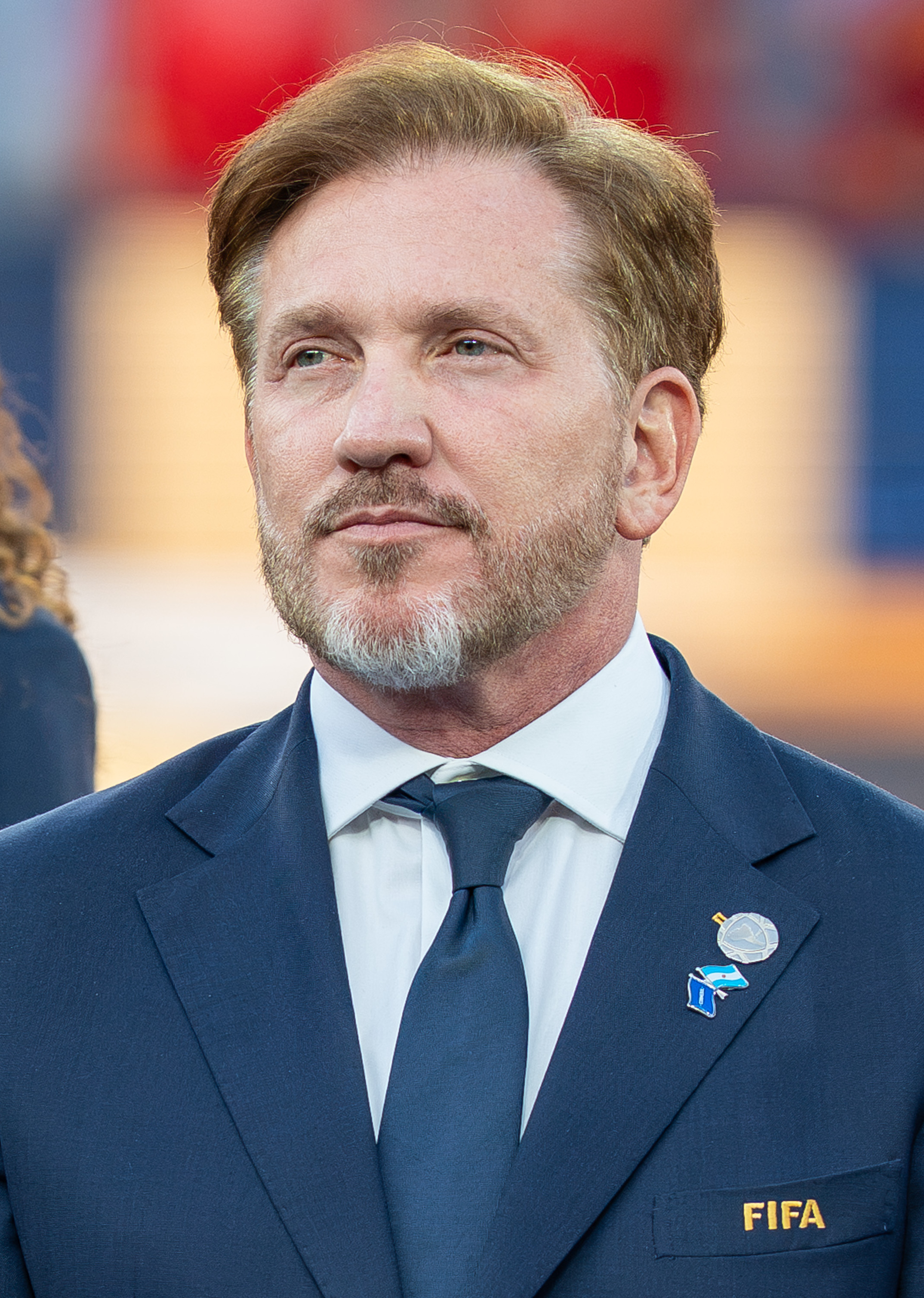
- Domínguez in 2026
- Born: Alejandro Guillermo Domínguez Wilson-Smith; 25 January 1972 (age 54); Asunción, Paraguay
- Education: University of Kansas; Universidad Católica "Nuestra Señora de la Asunción"
- Occupation: Football administrator
- Title: President, CONMEBOL; Vice president and member, FIFA Executive Committee
- Term: 2016–
- Predecessor: Juan Ángel Napout
- Parent(s): Osvaldo Domínguez Dibb; Peggy Wilson-Smith
- Website: twitter.com/agdws

Alejandro Guillermo Domínguez Wilson-Smith (born 25 January 1972) is a Paraguayan football administrator, president of CONMEBOL, a vice-president of FIFA and a member of the FIFA Council.

== Early life and education ==
Domínguez was born on 25 January 1972, the son of Osvaldo Domínguez Dibb (a wealthy businessman and football administrator) and Peggy Wilson-Smith.

Domínguez attended school at Saint Andrews School, located in Asunción, where he held the position of president of the Student Council. Domínguez graduated high school in 1990. Domínguez holds a major in Economics, and a minor in Business, Latin American Studies from the University of Kansas, in the United States. Moreover, Domínguez completed his Master's in Business Administration (MBA) at Catholic University of Asunción - Paraguay (UCA), graduating with honors.

== Career ==
Domínguez began his career as director of the tapas production company Corona Atlántida (1996–1998). He was general manager of the Paraguayan newspaper La Nación (1998–2014) and assumed the presidency of Grupo Nación de Comunicaciones (1999–2014), where he founded the newspaper Crónica and radio 970 AM. He was a member of the board of directors of the Inter-American Press Association (2004–2006), where he was vice president for Paraguay of the Freedom of Expression Commission.

== Football administration ==
Domínguez has a strong connection to football administration via his father Osvaldo Domínguez Dibb, a former president of a Paraguayan team, Club Olimpia. His leadership in the football world began in 1997 as a member of the board of directors, and later the presidency of the Olimpia Centennial Commission between 2001 and 2002. Thereafter, Domínguez was appointed vice-president of the Club until 2005.

Between 2007 and 2014, he held the vice-presidency of the Paraguayan Football Association before becoming president between 2014 and 2016.

=== CONMEBOL Presidency ===
Domínguez was elected president of CONMEBOL in January 2016. He was the only candidate, after Wilmar Valdez of Uruguay withdrew, and was elected unanimously.

Domínguez succeeded his close friend, fellow Paraguayan Juan Ángel Napout, who was arrested in Switzerland in December 2015 and extradited to the US.

Under Domínguez's presidency, CONMEBOL, returned hundreds of millions of the stolen dollars, significantly increased prize money on offer for CONMEBOL tournaments, helped organize vaccines during COVID19, obtained the anti-bribery management ISO 37001 Certification, significantly expanded its female football offerings, awarded the Contest of Good Practices of Transparency first prize by the Anti-Corruption Secretariat of Paraguay, and improved relationships with UEFA via a strategic alliance.

In May 2018, Domínguez was re-elected and in April 2022, he was elected for a third term.

==== Tarzan Without Cheetah Controversy ====
When Palmeiras president Leila Pereira said that Brazilian clubs should consider pulling out of South American competitions due to the lack of strong sanctions against racism, Domínguez replied That would be like Tarzan without Cheetah, impossible. These comments sparked a huge backlash and Domínguez apologised for the comments.

== Personal ==
Dominguez is married to Maria Mercedes Perez. They have three children.
