= Uruguayan Football Association =

Governing body of association football in Uruguay

CONMEBOL
- Founded: March 30, 1900; 126 years ago
- Headquarters: Montevideo
- FIFA affiliation: 1923
- CONMEBOL affiliation: 1916
- President: Ignacio Alonso
- Website: www.auf.org.uy

The Uruguayan Football Association (Spanish: Asociación Uruguaya de Fútbol — AUF) is the governing body of football in Uruguay. It was founded in 1900, as The Uruguayan Association Football League, and affiliated to FIFA in 1923. It is a founding member of CONMEBOL and is in charge of the national men's team and the national women's team, as well as the Uruguayan football league system.

== History ==
Flag of Uruguayan Football Association

In 1900, Albion F.C. sent invitations to Central Uruguay Railway Cricket Club, Uruguay Athletic Club, and Deutscher Fussball Klub; the four teams were founding members.

== Presidents ==
Chronological list of A.U.F. presidents

| Period | Name |
|---|---|
| 1900 | Pedro Charter |
| 1901 | William Poole |
| 1902 | Carlos Rowland |
| 1903 – 1904 | Jorge Clulow |
| 1905 | Félix Ortiz de Taranco |
| 1906 | Jorge Clulow |
| 1907 – 1912 | Héctor Rivadavia Gómez |
| 1913 – 1914 | Dr. Abelardo Véscovi |
| 1915 – 1918 | Dr. Juan Blengio Rocca |
| 1919 | Dr. Ángel Colombo |
| 1920 – 1921 | León Peyrou |
| 1922 – 1923 | Dr. José M. Reyes Lerena |
| 1924 – 1925 | Atilio Narancio |
| 1926 | Héctor Rivadavia Gómez |
| 1927 – 1930 | Dr. Raúl Jude |
| 1931 | César Batlle Pacheco |
| 1932 – 1933 | Dr. Mario Ponce De León |
| 1934 – 1937 | Dr. Raúl Jude |
| 1938 – 1939 | Aníbal Garderes |
| 1940 – 1941 | Esc. Héctor Gerona |
| 1942 | Dr. Cyro Geanbruno |
| 1943 – 1952 | César Batlle Pacheco |
| 1953 – 1956 | Arq. Miguel Ángel Cattaneo |
| 1957 – 1960 | Fermín Sorhueta |
| 1961 – 1963 | Gral. Omar Porcincula |
| 1964 | Américo Gil |
| 1965 – 1966 | Brigadier Conrado Sáez |
| 1967 – 1969 | Julio Lacarte Muro |
| 1970 – 1972 | Américo Gil |
| 1973 | Fermín Sorhueta |
| 1974 – 1976 | Ing. Héctor Del Campo |
| 1976 | Dr. Carlos Keralto |
| 1977 – 1978 | Cr. Mario Garbarino |
| 1978 – 1980 | Yamandu Flangini |
| 1981 – 1982 | Cnel (R.) Matías Vázquez |
| 1983 – 1986 | Cnel (R.) Héctor Joanicó |
| 1986 | Miguel Volonterio |
| 1987 | Dr. Donato Griecco |
| 1988 – 1989 | Ing. Julio C. Franzini |
| 1989 – 1990 | Dr. Julio César Maglione |
| 1991 – 1993 | Dr. Hugo Batalla |
| 1994 – 1996 | Carlos Maresca |
| 1997 – 2006 | Eugenio Figueredo |
| 2006 – 2008 | Dr. José Luis Corbo |
| 2008 – 2009 | Washington Rivero |
| 2009 – 2014 | Dr. Sebastián Bauzá |
| 2014 – 2018 | Wilmar Valdez |
| 2018 – 2019 | Normalisation committee: Bordaberry-Castaingdebat-Scotti |
| 2019 – | Ignacio Alonso |

=== Association staff ===
| Name | Position | Source |
|---|---|---|
| (Uruguay) Gelston Teladi | President | |
| n/a | Vice President | |
| (Uruguay) Maria Diaz | General Secretary | |
| (Uruguay) Ignacio Alonso | Treasurer | |
| (Uruguay) Gustavo Banales | Technical Director | |
| n/a | Senior Team Manager (Men's) | |
| (Uruguay) Ariel Longo | Senior Team Manager (Women's) | |
| (Uruguay) Matias Faral | Media/Communications Manager | |
| (Uruguay) Kevork Kouyoumdyan | Futsal Coordinator | |
| (Uruguay) Dario Ubracio | Referee Coordinator | |

== Tournaments organized ==
- Primera División
- Copa Uruguay
- Segunda División
- Campeonato Uruguayo Femenino

== Men's football ==
The AUF organizes the national football tournament, two professional divisions (First Division and Second Division), and the third category (Amateur Second Division), involving amateur teams from Montevideo metropolitan area. Amateur clubs from the rest of the country are organized by the Interior Football Organization (OFI), federation affiliated to the AUF, but independently.

== Women's football ==
In Women's football the AUF established the Uruguayan Championship which takes place every year since 1997. In conjunction with the OFI they organized a national tournament called National Tournament of Women's Football which there were only two editions (2001 and 2003).

== Futsal ==
AUF annually develops the Men's Campeonato de Primera Division, U-20, U-17 and the same tournaments for women. The AUF is one of the two entities that regulates futsal, the other is the Uruguayan Federation of Indoor Football.

== See also ==
- Uruguayan Football Federation
- Uruguay national football team
- Uruguay A' national football team
- Uruguay national under-23 football team
- Uruguay national under-20 football team
- Uruguay national under-17 football team
- Uruguay women's national football team
- Uruguay women's national under-20 football team
- Uruguay women's national under-17 football team
