= 2025 Copa América de Futsal Femenina =

Copa América Futsal Femenina 2025

Tournament details
- Host country: Brazil
- City: Sorocaba
- Dates: 22–30 March
- Teams: 10 (from 1 confederation)
- Venue: 1 (in 1 host city)

Final positions
- Champions: Brazil (8th title)
- Runners-up: Argentina
- Third place: Colombia
- Fourth place: Paraguay

Tournament statistics
- Matches played: 27
- Goals scored: 146 (5.41 per match)
- Top scorer(s): (Colombia) Nicole Mancilla (10 goals)

The 2025 Copa América de Futsal Femenina was the 9th edition of the Copa América de Futsal Femenina, the international futsal championship organised by CONMEBOL for the women's national teams of South America. The tournament took place in Sorocaba, São Paulo, Brazil from March 22 to 30, 2025.

This edition marked the tournament's debut as the CONMEBOL qualifiers for the FIFA Women's Futsal World Cup. The top three teams qualified for the 2025 FIFA Futsal Women's World Cup in the Philippines as CONMEBOL representatives.

Brazil were three-time defending champions, having won the last three editions. and they successfully defended their title, overcoming Argentina in their third straight final to secure their eighth title.

== Teams ==
All 10 CONMEBOL members entered the tournament.

Team	Appearance	Previous best performance
Argentina	9th	Runners-up (2011, 2019, 2023)
Bolivia	5th	Sixth place (2009, 2019)
Brazil	8th	Champions (2005, 2007, 2009, 2011, 2017, 2019, 2023)
Chile	6th	Third place (2015)
Colombia	8th	Champions (2015)
Ecuador	7th	Runners-up (2005)
Paraguay	7th	Third place (2011)
Peru	9th	Fourth place (2009)
Uruguay	9th	Runners-up (2015)
Venezuela	7th	Third place (2007, 2009)

=== Squads ===
Each national team was required to submit a squad of 10 to 14 players, at least two of whom had to be goalkeepers (Regulations Article 45).

Argentina	Bolivia	Brazil	Chile	Colombia
1 Trinidad D'Andrea; 2 Cintia López; 3 Lucía Rossi; 4 Sofía Florentín; 5 Melina Quevedo; 6 Jazmín Della Vedova; 7 Luciana Natta; 8 Carina Núñez (C); 9 Ana Ontiveros; 10 Silvina Nava; 11 Paula Chiesa; 12 Silvina Espinazo; 13 Mailén Romero; 14 Alejandra Gayoso	1 Kimberly López; 2 Desiree Nava; 3 Briseyda Orellana; 4 Sonia Turihuano; 5 Alexandra Montalvo; 6 Dayana Jiménez; 7 Yoselin Portales; 8 Ingrid Siles; 9 Karla Ticona; 10 Martha Chura; 11 María Gálvez (C); 12 Ruth Copa; 13 Ana Rojas; 14 Wendy Baltazar	1 Jozi; 2 Vanin; 3 Bianca; 4 Taty (C); 5 Tampa; 6 Bia; 7 Diana; 8 Nati Detoni; 9 Emilly; 10 Luciléia; 11 Camila; 12 Amandinha; 13 Natalinha; 14 Ana Luiza	1 Valeria Rojas; 2 Sara Allende; 3 Emily Muñoz; 4 Francisca Puma; 5 Josefina Gómez; 6 Nadia Toro; 7 Daniela Panguinao (C); 8 Vilma Ruiz; 9 Muriel Araneda; 10 Rocío Maira; 11 Giselle Padilla; 12 Génesis Gómez; 13 Daniela Gómez; 14 Álvarez	1 Paula Valencia; 2 Laura Bustos; 3 Sonia Avendaño; 4 Isabella Mosquera; 5 Danna Rodríguez; 6 Alejandra Apraez; 7 Merlin Salcedo (C); 8 Angely Camargo; 9 Nicole Mancilla; 10 Melissa Jaimes; 11 Dayana Rivera; 12 Nicole Cardona; 13 Karen Torres; 14 Mariana Restrepo Triana
Ecuador	Paraguay	Peru	Uruguay	Venezuela
1 Darla Lara; 2 Ingrid Rodríguez; 3 Kelly Bone; 4 Tammy Chillambo; 5 Sara Garcés; 6 Jessica Quizhpilema; 7 Iris Reyes; 8 Daniela Fernández; 9 Andrea Ochoa (C); 10 Cinthia Bone; 11 Ana Ñacashag; 12 Ana Villarreal; 13 Emily Tomala; 14 Karol Guzhñay	1 Sara Silva; 2 Verónica Vallejos; 3 Jazmín Armoa; 4 Diana Benítez; 5 Jamila Acosta; 6 Cinthia Arévalo (C); 7 Claudia Romero; 8 Lorena Brítez; 9 Liz Sosa; 10 Paola Brítez; 11 Nataly Lezcano; 12 Jessica Franco; 13 Perla Bareiro; 14 Liz Ortíz	1 Madelyne Huamani; 2 Kely Peralta; 3 Rosa Mejía; 4 Amparo Chuquival; 5 Keyly Peralta; 6 Ana Irina Alva; 7 Stephannie Vásquez; 8 María Valentín; 9 Kiara Gonzáles; 10 Grace Soto; 11 Nayeli Conde; 12 Joselyn Medrano; 13 Xiomara Escudero; 14 Lucy Meza (C)	1 Inés Lupano; 2 Ailin Silvera; 3 Antonella Perdomo; 4 Shamila González; 5 Celeste Santana; 6 Valentina Márquez; 7 Stefany Suárez; 8 Jimena Álvez; 9 Maura Scaletti; 10 Jennifer Clara; 11 Naiara Ferrari; 12 Victoria Pérez; 13 Federica Silvera (C); 14 Fátima Villar	1 Emily Brito; 2 Verónica da Silva; 3 Cinthia Zarabia; 4 Mariannys Rodríguez; 5 Roraima Vielma; 6 Cristina Rivas; 7 Zharit Fuentes; 8 Carla Crespo; 9 Francheska Palencia; 10 Yilvi Conde; 11 Mariangela Magdaleno; 12 Marinel Argüinzones (C); 13 Génesis Vegas; 14 Adrianny Luna

== Draw ==
The hosts and the defending champions, Brazil, along with runners-up Argentina, were seeded and placed at the top of Groups A and B, respectively. The remaining eight teams were divided into four "pairing pots" based on their final standings in the tournament's previous edition (shown in brackets).

Pot 1	Pot 2	Pot 3	Pot 4
Colombia (3); Venezuela (4)	Paraguay (5); Uruguay (6)	Bolivia (7); Chile (8)	Ecuador (9); Peru (10)

== Officiating ==
On 10 March 2025, CONMEBOL announced the list of 22 referees appointed to officiate the ninth edition.

Referees

- (Argentina) Estefania Pinto
- (Argentina) Lorena Sánchez
- (Argentina) Aldana Arrieta
- (Bolivia) Martha Quispe
- (Bolivia) Edit Labrandero
- (Brazil) Anelize Schulz
- (Brazil) Juliana Angelo
- (Chile) Valeria Palma
- (Chile) Lady Muñoz
- (Colombia) Nataly Giraldo
- (Colombia) Naudy Gimenez
- (Colombia) Yendis Montalvo
- (Ecuador) Gema Villavicencio
- (Ecuador) Jennifer Muñoz
- (Paraguay) Astrid Mendoza
- (Paraguay) Fany Martinez
- (Paraguay) Maria Cáceres
- (Peru) Johanna Vega
- (Peru) Mercedes Guzmán
- (Uruguay) Paula López
- (Venezuela) Tayana Moreno
- (Venezuela) Oriana Zambrano

== Group stage ==
=== Tiebreakers ===
The ranking of teams in the group stage was determined based on the total number of points obtained in all group matches (three points for a win, one for a draw, and none for a defeat). If two or more teams were equal on points, the following criteria were applied, in order (Regulations Article 20):

1. Points obtained in the matches played between the teams in question;
2. Goal difference in the matches played between the teams in question;
3. Number of goals scored in the matches played between the teams in question;
4. Goal difference in all group matches;
5. Number of goals scored in all group matches;
6. Fewest red cards received in all group matches;
7. Fewest yellow cards received in all group matches;
8. Drawing of lots.

=== Group A ===
Pos	Team	Pld	W	D	L	GF	GA	GD	Pts	Qualification
1	Brazil (H)	4	4	0	0	29	1	+28	12	Advance to the Semi-finals
2	Paraguay	4	3	0	1	10	9	+1	9	Advance to the Semi-finals
3	Ecuador	4	2	0	2	11	21	−10	6	Fifth place play-off
4	Venezuela	4	1	0	3	6	11	−5	3	Seventh place play-off
5	Bolivia	4	0	0	4	5	19	−14	0	Ninth place play-off

Source: CONMEBOL
Rules for classification: Group stage tiebreakers
(H) Hosts
22 March 2025
13:15

Brazil	9–1	Bolivia
Luciléia 7'46"; Ana Luiza 10'52"; Diana 12'11"; Emilly 18'39" (2pen.), 26'22"; Camila 21'44", 39'16"; Amandinha 23'59"; Taty 33'33"	Report	Gálvez 35'35"

Arena Sorocaba, Sorocaba
Referee: Johanna Vega (Peru)
Referee: Nataly Giraldo (Colombia)
22 March 2025
20:00

Ecuador	2–5	Paraguay
Ochoa 18'18"; Quizhpilema 34'34"	Report	P. Brítez 2'37", 4'53", 14'21", 20'42"; Acosta 15'06"

Arena Sorocaba, Sorocaba
Referee: Lorena Sánchez (Argentina)
Referee: Lady Muñoz (Chile)

23 March 2025
17:45

Bolivia	0–3	Venezuela
	Report	Rojas 1'32" (o.g.); Rivas 24'41"; Luna 35'01"

Arena Sorocaba, Sorocaba
Referee: Yendis Montalvo (Colombia)
Referee: Valeria Palma (Chile)
23 March 2025
20:00

Ecuador	0–11	Brazil
	Report	Diana 0'37", 35'16"; Nati Detoni 2'53", 7'26"; Ana Luiza 17'29"; Tampa 19'07", 32'43", 32'54"; Emilly 26'51"; Bia 30'20"; Luciléia 36'09"

Arena Sorocaba, Sorocaba
Referee: Naudy Gimenez (Colombia)
Referee: Aldana Arrieta (Argentina)

24 March 2025
17:45

Bolivia	3–5	Ecuador
Chura 3'13"; Jiménez 29'06"; Orellana 39'17"	Report	K. Bone 2'43"; Garcés 7'37", 37'48"; Ochoa 11'42", 32'31"

Arena Sorocaba, Sorocaba
Referee: Lady Muñoz (Chile)
Referee: Paula López (Uruguay)
24 March 2025
20:00

Venezuela	1–3	Paraguay
Vielma 8'28"	Report	Romero 25'06"; Benítez 26'28"; Vallejos 33'39"

Arena Sorocaba, Sorocaba
Referee: Estefania Pinto (Argentina)
Referee: Nataly Giraldo (Colombia)

26 March 2025
17:45

Venezuela	2–4	Ecuador
Conde 8'25"; Magdaleno 21'05"	Report	Ochoa 12'09", 20'04"; Rodríguez 38'42" (2pen.); Garcés 39'57"

Arena Sorocaba, Sorocaba
Referee: Johanna Vega (Peru)
Referee: Mercedes Guzmán (Peru)
26 March 2025
20:00

Paraguay	0–5	Brazil
	Report	Tampa 7'59", 8'41", 19'25"; Nati Detoni 25'09"; Vanin 36'07"

Arena Sorocaba, Sorocaba
Referee: Valeria Palma (Chile)
Referee: Yendis Montalvo (Colombia)

27 March 2025
17:45

Brazil	4–0	Venezuela
Vanin 2'11"; Luciléia 4'43"; Amandinha 30'57", 39'37"	Report

Arena Sorocaba, Sorocaba
Referee: Aldana Arrieta (Argentina)
Referee: Estefania Pinto (Argentina)
27 March 2025
20:00

Paraguay	2–1	Bolivia
Arévalo 24'33"; P. Brítez 31'09"	Report	Portales 16'23"

Arena Sorocaba, Sorocaba
Referee: Lorena Sánchez (Argentina)
Referee: Naudy Gimenez (Colombia)

=== Group B ===
Pos	Team	Pld	W	D	L	GF	GA	GD	Pts	Qualification
1	Argentina	4	3	1	0	18	3	+15	10	Advance to the Semi-finals
2	Colombia	4	2	2	0	16	4	+12	8	Advance to the Semi-finals
3	Uruguay	4	2	1	1	11	7	+4	7	Fifth place play-off
4	Chile	4	1	0	3	4	9	−5	3	Seventh place play-off
5	Peru	4	0	0	4	2	28	−26	0	Ninth place play-off

Source: CONMEBOL
Rules for classification: Group stage tiebreakers
22 March 2025
15:30

Argentina	4–0	Chile
Romero 15'01"; Chiesa 26'49"; Núñez 28'07"; Della Vedova 32'34"	Report

Arena Sorocaba, Sorocaba
Referee: Astrid Mendoza (Paraguay)
Referee: Tayana Moreno (Venezuela)
22 March 2025
17:45

Peru	1–5	Uruguay
Vásquez 10'15"	Report	González 0'35"; Scaletti 5'53", 37'30"; Álvez 10'57"; Suárez 34'28"

Arena Sorocaba, Sorocaba
Referee: Fany Martinez (Paraguay)
Referee: Edit Labrandero (Bolivia)

23 March 2025
13:15

Chile	1–2	Colombia
Maira 28'39"	Report	Salcedo 20'50"; Mancilla 39'35"

Arena Sorocaba, Sorocaba
Referee: Juliana Angelo (Brazil)
Referee: Jennifer Muñoz (Ecuador)
23 March 2025
15:30

Peru	0–10	Argentina
	Report	Nava 3'11", 26'12"; Florentín 5'03", 13'13"; López 7'13"; Rossi 18'07"; Della Vedova 18'42"; Núñez 29'51", 37'07"; Ontiveros 31'23"

Arena Sorocaba, Sorocaba
Referee: Oriana Zambrano (Venezuela)
Referee: Gema Villavicencio (Ecuador)

24 March 2025
13:15

Chile	2–1	Peru
Ruiz 21'48"; Maira 38'02"	Report	Gonzáles 35'07"

Arena Sorocaba, Sorocaba
Referee: Maria Cáceres (Paraguay)
Referee: Martha Quispe (Bolivia)
24 March 2025
15:30

Uruguay	2–2	Colombia
Ferrari 5'22"; Scaletti 9'58"	Report	Mancilla 4'46"; Jaimes 19'44"

Arena Sorocaba, Sorocaba
Referee: Anelize Schulz (Brazil)
Referee: Astrid Mendoza (Paraguay)

26 March 2025
13:15

Colombia	11–0	Peru
Camargo 5'49", 17'44", 21'20", 34'49"; Mancilla 14'01", 31'12", 32'54", 33'20", 39'16"; Apraez 34'21"; Rodríguez 39'09"	Report

Arena Sorocaba, Sorocaba
Referee: Tayana Moreno (Venezuela)
Referee: Edit Labrandero (Bolivia)
26 March 2025
15:30

Uruguay	2–3	Argentina
Silvera 4'07"; Scaletti 23'53"	Report	Nava 14'37"; Natta 27'42", 32'45"

Arena Sorocaba, Sorocaba
Referee: Maria Cáceres (Paraguay)
Referee: Fany Martinez (Paraguay)

27 March 2025
13:15

Uruguay	2–1	Chile
González 21'04"; Suárez 23'49"	Report	Rojas 14'03"

Arena Sorocaba, Sorocaba
Referee: Oriana Zambrano (Venezuela)
Referee: Tayana Moreno (Venezuela)
27 March 2025
15:30

Argentina	1–1	Colombia
Núñez 32'30"	Report	Mancilla 36'53"

Arena Sorocaba, Sorocaba
Referee: Anelize Schulz (Brazil)
Referee: Juliana Angelo (Brazil)

== Play-off stage ==
In the play-off stage, if a match is tied after the regular playing time (Regulations Article 20):

- In the semi-finals and final, two extra time periods of five minutes each would be played. If still tied after extra time, the match would be decided by a penalty shoot-out.
- In the play-offs for third, fifth, seventh, and ninth place, extra time would not be played, and the match would be decided directly by a penalty shoot-out.

=== Bracket ===
Semi-finals
29 March
Brazil	6
Colombia	0
29 March
Argentina	3
Paraguay	1

Final
30 March
Brazil	3
Argentina	0
Third place play-off
30 March
Colombia	4
Paraguay	1

Ninth place play-off
29 March
Bolivia	3
Peru	0

Seventh place play-off
29 March
Venezuela	3
Chile	0

Fifth place play-off
30 March
Ecuador	4
Uruguay	6

=== Ninth place game ===
29 March 2025
11:00

Bolivia	3–0	Peru
Chura 21'18", 37'02"; Baltazar 39'59"	Report

Arena Sorocaba, Sorocaba
Referee: Nataly Giraldo (Colombia)
Referee: Astrid Mendoza (Paraguay)

=== Seventh place game ===
29 March 2025
19:00

Venezuela	3–0	Chile
da Silva 10'35"; Rivas 24'00"; Magdaleno 27'17"	Report

Arena Sorocaba, Sorocaba
Referee: Naudy Gimenez (Colombia)
Referee: Lorena Sánchez (Argentina)

=== Semi-finals ===
Winners will qualify for the 2025 FIFA Futsal Women's World Cup.

29 March 2025
13:30

Argentina	3–1	Paraguay
Nava 27'58"; Romero 33'34"; Ontiveros 39'19"	Report	P. Brítez 4'37"

Arena Sorocaba, Sorocaba
Referee: Oriana Zambrano (Venezuela)
Referee: Tayana Moreno (Venezuela)

29 March 2025
16:15

Brazil	6–0	Colombia
Nati Detoni 6'13"; Vanin 9'59"; Diana 10'31"; Natalinha 25'57", 26'47"; Taty 29'43"	Report

Arena Sorocaba, Sorocaba
Referee: Valeria Palma (Chile)
Referee: Lady Muñoz (Chile)

=== Fifth place game ===
30 March 2025
10:30

Ecuador	4–6	Uruguay
Ochoa 1'27", 17'56", 24'30", 32'08"	Report	González 10'44"; Scaletti 13'11"; Silvera 18'07"; Villar 18'17"; Santana 37'13"; Ferrari 37'53"

Arena Sorocaba, Sorocaba
Referee: Aldana Arrieta (Argentina)
Referee: Edit Labrandero (Bolivia)

=== Third place game ===
Winners will qualify for the 2025 FIFA Futsal Women's World Cup.

30 March 2025
13:00

Colombia	4–1	Paraguay
Mancilla 13'51", 23'38"; Camargo 14'25", 19'27"	Report	L. Brítez 12'03"

Arena Sorocaba, Sorocaba
Referee: Estefania Pinto (Argentina)
Referee: Anelize Schulz (Brazil)

=== Final ===
30 March 2025
16:00

Brazil	3–0	Argentina
Vanin 16'41"; Natalinha 25'38", 26'38"	Report

Arena Sorocaba, Sorocaba
Referee: Yendis Montalvo (Colombia)
Referee: Fany Martinez (Paraguay)

== Goalscorers ==
There were 146 goals scored in 27 matches, for an average of 5.41 goals per match.

10 goals

- (Colombia) Nicole Mancilla

9 goals

- (Ecuador) Andrea Ochoa

6 goals

- (Brazil) Tampa
- (Colombia) Angely Camargo
- (Paraguay) Paola Brítez

5 goals

- (Uruguay) Maura Scaletti

4 goals

- (Argentina) Silvina Nava
- (Argentina) Carina Núñez
- (Brazil) Diana
- (Brazil) Natalinha
- (Brazil) Nati Detoni
- (Brazil) Vanin

3 goals

- (Bolivia) Martha Chura
- (Brazil) Amandinha
- (Brazil) Emilly
- (Brazil) Luciléia
- (Ecuador) Sara Garcés
- (Uruguay) Shamila González

2 goals

- (Argentina) Jazmín Della Vedova
- (Argentina) Sofía Florentín
- (Argentina) Luciana Natta
- (Argentina) Ana Ontiveros
- (Argentina) Mailén Romero
- (Brazil) Ana Luiza
- (Brazil) Camila
- (Brazil) Taty
- (Chile) Rocío Maira
- (Uruguay) Naiara Ferrari
- (Uruguay) Federica Silvera
- (Uruguay) Stefany Suárez
- (Venezuela) Mariangela Magdaleno
- (Venezuela) Cristina Rivas

1 goal

- (Argentina) Paula Chiesa
- (Argentina) Cintia López
- (Argentina) Lucía Rossi
- (Bolivia) Wendy Baltazar
- (Bolivia) María Gálvez
- (Bolivia) Dayana Jiménez
- (Bolivia) Briseyda Orellana
- (Bolivia) Yoselin Portales
- (Brazil) Bia
- (Chile) Valeria Rojas
- (Chile) Vilma Ruiz
- (Colombia) Alejandra Apraez
- (Colombia) Melissa Jaimes
- (Colombia) Danna Rodríguez
- (Colombia) Merlin Salcedo
- (Ecuador) Kelly Bone
- (Ecuador) Jessica Quizhpilema
- (Ecuador) Ingrid Rodríguez
- (Paraguay) Jamila Acosta
- (Paraguay) Cinthia Arévalo
- (Paraguay) Diana Benítez
- (Paraguay) Lorena Brítez
- (Paraguay) Claudia Romero
- (Paraguay) Verónica Vallejos
- (Peru) Kiara Gonzáles
- (Peru) Stephannie Vásquez
- (Uruguay) Jimena Álvez
- (Uruguay) Celeste Santana
- (Uruguay) Fátima Villar
- (Venezuela) Yilvi Conde
- (Venezuela) Verónica da Silva
- (Venezuela) Adrianny Luna
- (Venezuela) Roraima Vielma

1 own goal

- (Bolivia) Ana Rojas (against Venezuela)

== Final ranking ==
Pos	Team	Pld	W	D	L	GF	GA	GD	Pts	Final result
1	Brazil (H)	6	6	0	0	38	1	+37	18	Champions
2	Argentina	6	4	1	1	21	7	+14	13	Runners-up
3	Colombia	6	3	2	1	20	11	+9	11	Third place
4	Paraguay	6	3	0	3	12	16	−4	9	Fourth place
5	Uruguay	5	3	1	1	17	11	+6	10	Fifth place
6	Ecuador	5	2	0	3	15	27	−12	6	Sixth place
7	Venezuela	5	2	0	3	9	11	−2	6	Seventh place
8	Chile	5	1	0	4	4	12	−8	3	Eighth place
9	Bolivia	5	1	0	4	8	19	−11	3	Ninth place
10	Peru	5	0	0	5	2	31	−29	0	Tenth place

Source: CONMEBOL
(H) Hosts

== Qualified teams for FIFA Futsal Women's World Cup ==
The following three teams from CONMEBOL qualified for the 2025 FIFA Futsal Women's World Cup.

Team	Qualified on
Argentina	29 March 2025
Brazil	29 March 2025
Colombia	30 March 2025
