= Futsal at the South American Games =

Since 1998, no football tournament took place at the Odesur Games ('Olympic Games for South American countries'). Odesur abbreviates Organización Deportiva Sudamericana. Instead futsal events have been taking place since 2002.

== Results ==
=== Men's tournament ===
Year	Host	Final			Third Place			Number of teams
Year	Host	Winner	Score	Runner-up	Third Place	Score	Fourth Place	Number of teams
2002; Details	Rio de Janeiro; Brazil	Brazil	5 - 0	Argentina	Bolivia	4 - 2	Paraguay	6
2006; Details	Buenos Aires; Argentina	Brazil	6 - 0	Paraguay	Argentina	2 - 1	Ecuador	10
2010; Details	Medellín; Colombia	Brazil	6 - 0	Uruguay	Colombia	3 - 0	Argentina	7
2014; Details	Santiago; Chile	Brazil	No playoffs	Argentina	Colombia	No playoffs	Paraguay	6
2018; Details	Cochabamba; Bolivia	Colombia	No playoffs	Paraguay	Argentina	No playoffs	Peru	6
2022; Details	Asunción; Paraguay	Argentina	No playoffs	Paraguay	Colombia	No playoffs	Bolivia	6

=== Women's tournament ===
Year	Host	Final			Third Place			Number of teams
Year	Host	Winner	Score	Runner-up	Third Place	Score	Fourth Place	Number of teams
2018; Details	Cochabamba; Bolivia	Colombia	No playoffs	Paraguay	Bolivia	No playoffs	Argentina	5
2022; Details	Asunción; Paraguay	Paraguay	No playoffs	Argentina	Bolivia	No playoffs	Uruguay	6

== Medal table ==
Rank	Nation	Gold	Silver	Bronze	Total
1	Brazil	4	0	0	4
2	Colombia	2	0	3	5
3	Paraguay	1	4	0	5
4	Argentina	1	3	2	6
5	Uruguay	0	1	0	1
6	Bolivia	0	0	3	3
Totals (6 entries)		8	8	8	24
