= Ivette Olivares =

Chilean footballer

Personal information
- Full name: Ivette Michelle Olivares Sepúlveda
- Date of birth: 4 August 1997 (age 29)
- Place of birth: Chile
- Position: Midfielder

Team information
- Current team: Universidad Católica
- Number: 20

Youth career
- Boston College

Senior career*
Years	Team	Apps	(Gls)
2015–2017	Boston College		
2015–2016	Boston College (futsal)		
2017	Santiago Morning		
2018–2019	Palestino (futsal)		
2019–2023	Palestino		
2024–	Universidad Católica		

International career^{‡}
2013	Chile U17		
2015	Chile U20		
2016	Chile U20 (futsal)		
2017–2019	Chile (futsal)		
2019–	Chile	6	(0)
- * Club domestic league appearances and goals ‡ National team caps and goals as of 17 January 2024

Ivette Michelle Olivares Sepúlveda (born 4 August 1997) is a Chilean football and futsal player who plays as a midfielder for Universidad Católica and the Chile women's national team.

== Club career ==
Olivares began her career with Boston College. She also had a stint with Santiago Morning.

In 2018, she joined Palestino, playing also for the futsal team, and signed her first professional contract in 2022.

In 2024, she switched to Universidad Católica.

== International career ==
At youth level, Navarrete represented Chile U17 in the 2013 South American Championship. In 2015, she also represented the under-20's in the South American Championship.

As a futsal player, she represented both the Chile national under-20 team in 2016 and the Chile senior team in both the 2017 and the 2019 Copa América.

At senior level, she made her debut in a 3–0 win against Uruguay on 6 October 2019. She was a substitute player in the 2023 inter-confederation play-offs against Haiti on 22 February 2023.

== Honours ==
Palestino (futsal)

- Campeonato Nacional: 2018
