= Peru women's national futsal team =

Peruvian football team represents peru in international football/soccer competitions

Peru
- Shirt badge/Association crest
- Nickname(s): La Bicolor
- Association: Peruvian Football Federation
- Confederation: CONMEBOL (South America)
- Head coach: Francisco Melgar
- FIFA code: PER
- FIFA ranking: 65 (24 September 2026)
- Highest FIFA ranking: 54 (May–October 2024)
- Lowest FIFA ranking: 54 (May–October 2024)
Home colours	Away colours

First international
- Brazil 5–2 Peru (Barueri, Brazil; 8 November 2005)

Biggest win
- Peru 9–4 Paraguay (Barueri, Brazil; 12 November 2005)

Biggest defeat
- Brazil 11–0 Peru (Campinas, Brazil; 6 September 2009); Argentina 11–0 Peru (Buenos Aires, Argentina; 24 September 2023); Colombia 11–0 Peru (Sorocaba, Brazil; 26 March 2025)

AMF World Cup
- Appearances: 1 (First in 2022)
- Best result: Group stage (2022)

Copa América de Futsal Femenina
- Appearances: 9 (First in 2005)
- Best result: Fourth place (2009)

The Peru women's national futsal team (Spanish: Selección Peruana Femenina de futsal) represents Peru in international futsal competitions and is controlled by the Peruvian Football Federation (FPF).

== History ==
Peru made its debut in the inaugural Sudamericano Femenino de Futsal in 2005, playing their first match against hosts Brazil, which ended in a 2–5 defeat. After a second loss to Uruguay, the team bounced back in style with a remarkable 9–4 victory over Paraguay — still their biggest win in history. Peru is one of only three nations to have participated in every edition of the continental tournament. Despite this consistency, the team has often struggled, finishing last on four occasions. Their best performance came in 2009 when they achieved a fourth-place finish.

In 2018, Peru took part in the first-ever women's futsal tournament at the South American Games, where they finished last, managing just one win — against Argentina.

In 2022, a team affiliated with the AMF represented Peru at the 2022 AMF Futsal Women's World Cup, exiting in the group stage after two defeats and a narrow win over France.

== Results and fixtures ==
The following is a list of match results in the last 12 months, as well as any future matches that have been scheduled.
Legend

Win Draw Lose Fixture

== Players ==
=== Current squad ===
The following 14 players were named in the squad for the 2025 Copa América de Futsal Femenina, held from 22 to 30 March 2025.

No.	Pos.	Player	Date of birth (age)	Club
1	GK	Madelyne Huamani	4 October 2001 (age 25)	(Peruvian Football Federation) Mecatrónica FC
2	MF	Kely Peralta	14 August 2003 (age 23)	Unattached
3	MF	Rosa Mejía	22 December 1996 (age 29)	Unattached
4	MF	Amparo Chuquival	21 February 1992 (age 34)	(Peruvian Football Federation) JC Sport Girls
5	MF	Keyly Peralta	14 August 2003 (age 23)	Unattached
6	DF	Ana Irina Alva	9 December 1991 (age 34)	(Peruvian Football Federation) Marte Club
7	MF	Stephannie Vásquez	24 June 1994 (age 32)	Unattached
8	DF	María Valentín	13 October 1995 (age 31)	(Peruvian Football Federation) Deportivo JAP
9	MF	Kiara Gonzáles	4 November 2002 (age 23)	(Peruvian Football Federation) Deportivo JAP
10	DF	Grace Soto	22 July 2002 (age 24)	(Peruvian Football Federation) CD Partizán Barranco
11	FW	Nayeli Conde	10 September 2001 (age 25)	(Peruvian Football Federation) Deportivo JAP
12	GK	Joselyn Medrano	2 November 1992 (age 33)	(Peruvian Football Federation) Deportivo JAP
13	MF	Xiomara Escudero	5 October 2002 (age 24)	Unattached
14	DF	Lucy Meza	4 September 1998 (age 28)	(Peruvian Football Federation) Mecatronica FC

== Competitive record ==
=== FIFA Futsal Women's World Cup ===
FIFA Futsal Women's World Cup record
Year	Position	Pld	W	D*	L	GF	GA
(Philippines) 2025	Did not qualify						
Total	0/1	—	—	—	—	—	—

*Draws include knockout matches decided on penalty kicks.

=== Copa América de Futsal Femenina ===
Copa América de Futsal Femenina record
Year	Position	Pld	W	D*	L	GF	GA
(Brazil) 2005	5th	3	1	0	2	13	13
(Ecuador) 2007	7th	3	0	0	3	2	12
(Brazil) 2009	4th	5	2	0	3	10	31
(Venezuela) 2011	9th	4	0	0	4	7	17
(Uruguay) 2015	6th	4	0	1	3	3	19
(Uruguay) 2017	9th	5	1	1	3	9	22
(Paraguay) 2019	8th	5	1	0	4	6	10
(Argentina) 2023	10th	5	0	0	5	8	40
(Brazil) 2025	10th	5	0	0	5	2	31
Total	9/9	39	5	2	32	60	195

*Draws include knockout matches decided on penalty kicks.

=== South American Games ===
Futsal at the South American Games record
Year	Position	Pld	W	D*	L	GF	GA
(Bolivia) 2018	5th	4	1	0	3	6	12
(Paraguay) 2022	Did not enter						
(Argentina) 2026	To be determined						
Total	2/2	9	4	1	4	17	15

== See also ==
- Peru women's national football team
