= Su Helen Galaz =

Chilean footballer (born 1991)

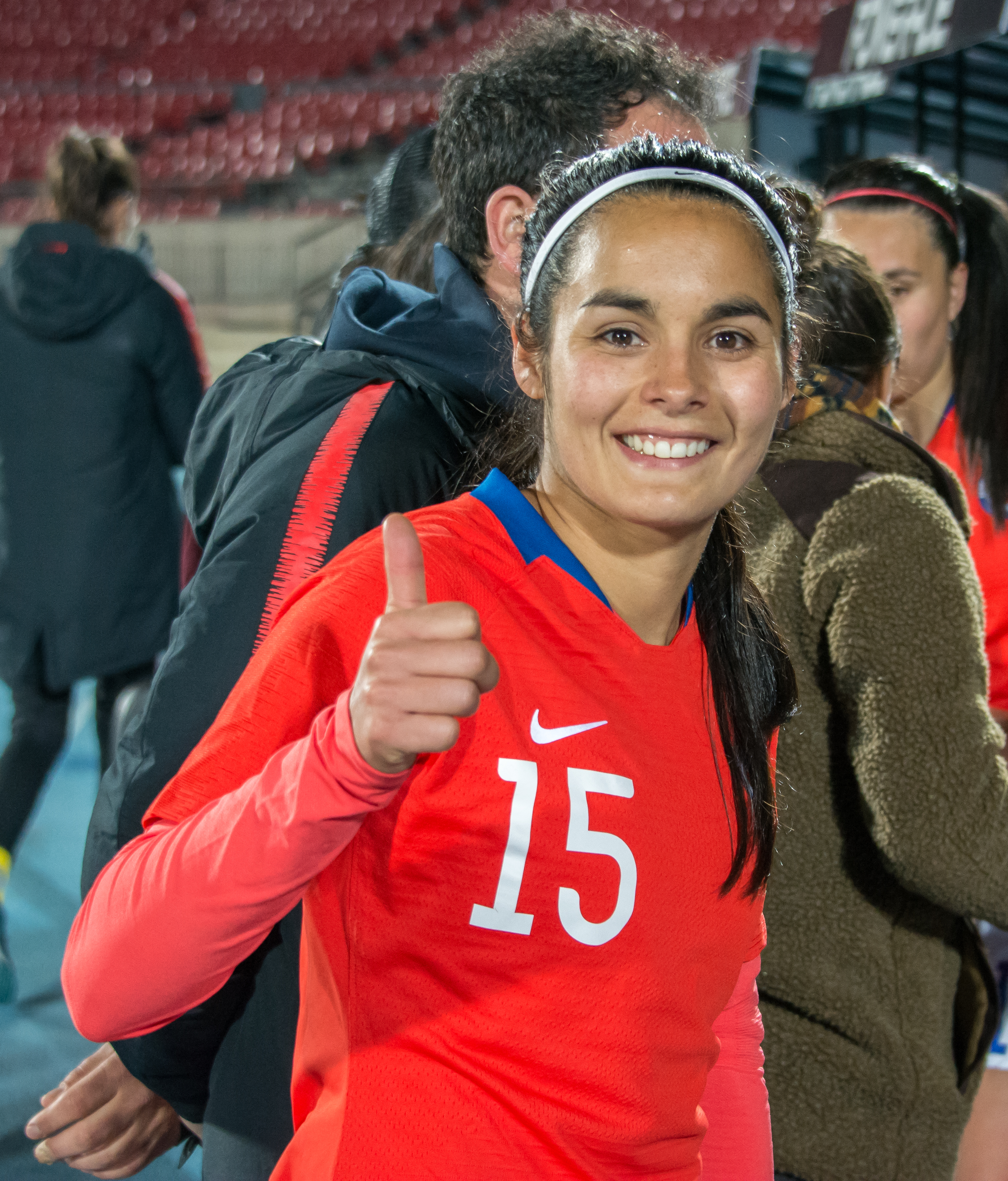
- Galaz with Chile in 2019

Personal information
- Full name: Su Helen Ignacia Galaz Espinoza
- Date of birth: 27 May 1991 (age 35)
- Place of birth: Algarrobo, Chile
- Height: 1.59 m (5 ft 2 1/2 in)
- Position: Defender

Team information
- Current team: Universidad de Chile
- Number: 17

Senior career*
Years	Team	Apps	(Gls)
2008	Provincial Osorno		
2009–2013	Everton		
2014–2018	Santiago Morning		
2018–2019	Zaragoza CFF		
2019–2024	Santiago Morning		
2025–	Universidad de Chile		

International career^{‡}
2010–	Chile	23	(0)
2015	Chile (futsal)		
Medal record
Women's football
Representing Chile
Pan American Games
Silver medal – second place	2023 Santiago	Team
South American Games
Silver medal – second place	2014 Santiago	Team
- * Club domestic league appearances and goals ‡ National team caps and goals as of 13:55, 13 September 2023 (UTC)

Su Helen Ignacia Galaz Espinoza (born 27 May 1991) is a Chilean footballer who plays as a defender for Universidad de Chile.

== Club career ==
Galaz played for Santiago Morning from 2014 to 2024. The next season, she switched Universidad de Chile.

== International career ==
She represented Chile at the 2023 Pan American Games, where Chile won the silver medal. Despite suffering a strain in the semi-final match against the United States, she appeared as the substitute goalkeeper in the gold medal match as there were no other goalkeepers in the squad.

Galaz also represented the Chile national futsal team in the 2015 Copa América de Futsal Femenina.

== Personal life ==
In December 2024, Galaz married Marcela Pérez, then a teammate in Santiago Morning.

== Honours ==
Everton

- Primera División (1): 2009
- Copa Chile (2): 2009, 2010

Santiago Morning

- Primera División (2): 2019, 2020

Chile

- South American Games Silver medal: 2014
- Copa América Runner-up: 2018
- Torneio Internacional de Futebol Feminino: 2019
- Turkish Women's Cup: 2020
- Pan American Games Silver Medal: 2023

Individual

- Premios Contragolpe - Ideal Team: 2021
- Primera División Ideal Team: 2024, 2025
