= South American U-20 Women's Futsal Championship =

CONMEBOL Sub 20 Futsal Femenina
- Organizing body: CONMEBOL
- Founded: 2016; 9 years ago
- Region: South America
- Number of teams: 10
- Related competitions: CONMEBOL Sub 20 Futsal
- Current champion(s): Colombia (1st title)
- Most successful team(s): Brazil (3 titles)
- Website: Official website
- 2024 CONMEBOL Sub 20 Futsal Femenina

The South American Under-20 Women's Futsal Championship (Spanish: Campeonato Sudamericano de Futsal Femenino Sub-20; Portuguese: Campeonato Sul-Americano de Futsal Feminino), branded as CONMEBOL Sub 20 Futsal Femenina, is an international women's association football competition held every two years for South American under-17 women teams.

== Results ==
Year	Host	Final			Third place play-off			Number of teams
Year	Host	Winners	Score	Runners-up	Third place	Score	Fourth place	Number of teams
2016; Details	Paraguay	Brazil	4–2	Colombia	Paraguay	6–2	Uruguay	8
2018; Details	Chile	Brazil	8–1	Paraguay	Uruguay	2–1	Colombia	10
2020		Cancelled due to COVID-19 pandemic						
2022; Details	Brazil	Brazil	3–0	Colombia	Argentina	6–0	Ecuador	10
2024; Details	Paraguay	Colombia	1–1 (6–5 p)	Brazil	Argentina	3–1	Uruguay	10

== Medal count ==
Rank	Nation	Gold	Silver	Bronze	Total
1	Brazil	3	1	0	4
2	Colombia	1	2	0	3
3	Paraguay	0	1	1	2
4	Argentina	0	0	2	2
5	Uruguay	0	0	1	1
Totals (5 entries)		4	4	4	12
