= Carla Guerrero =

Chilean footballer (born 1987)

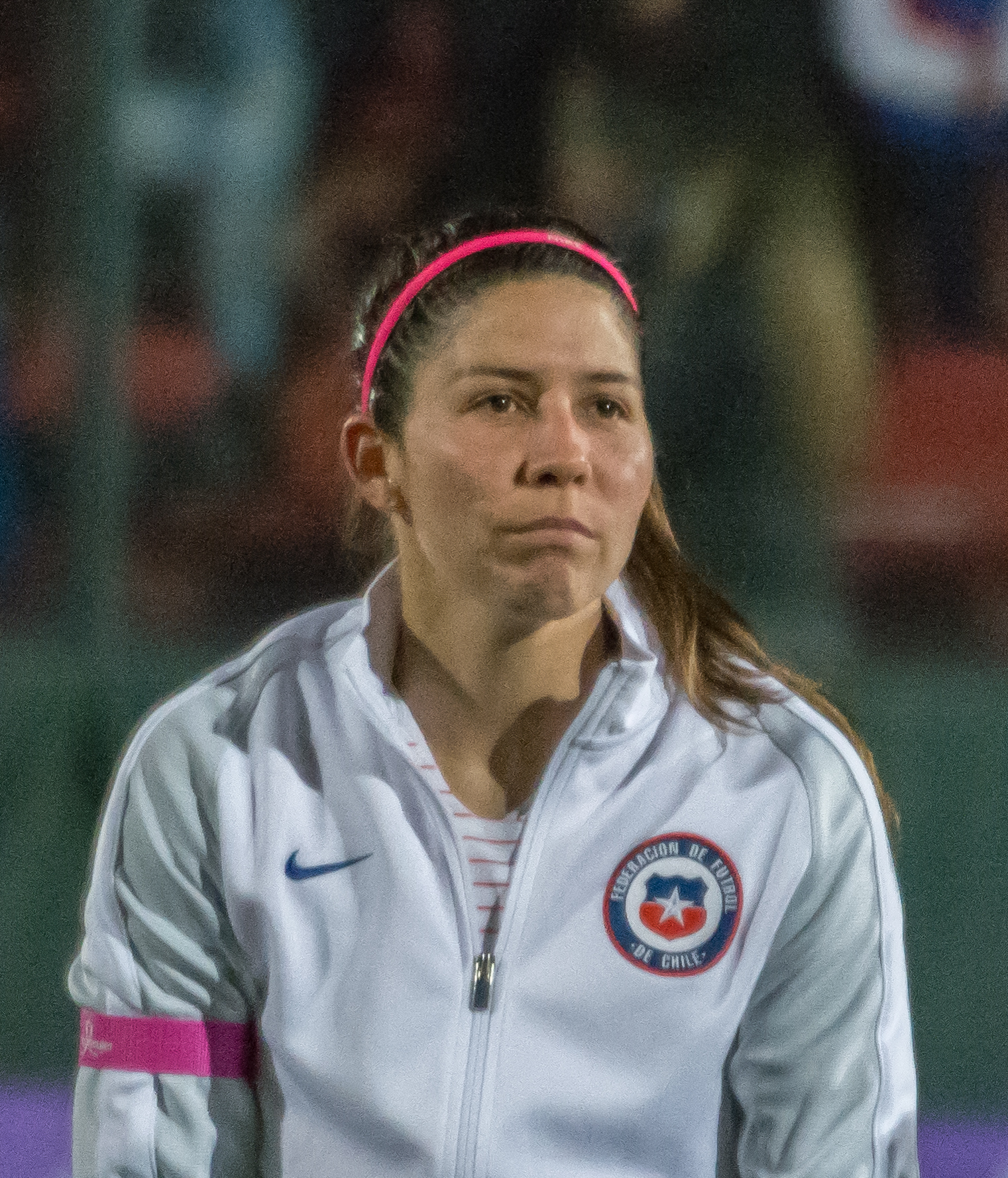
- Guerrero with Chile in 2018

Personal information
- Full name: Carla Valentina Guerrero Puelle
- Date of birth: 23 December 1987 (age 38)
- Place of birth: Santiago, Chile
- Height: 1.67 m (5 ft 6 in)
- Positions: Centre back; defensive midfielder

Senior career*
Years	Team	Apps	(Gls)
2004–2008	Universidad de Chile		
2009	Everton		
2010–2017	Colo Colo		
2018	Santa Fe		
2018–2020	Rayo Vallecano	7	(0)
2020–2025	Universidad de Chile		
2026	Universidad de Concepción		

International career^{‡}
2006–2023	Chile	84	(6)
2015	Chile (futsal)		
Medal record
Women's football
Representing Chile
South American Games
Silver medal – second place	2014 Santiago	Team
- * Club domestic league appearances and goals as of 11 April 2019 ‡ National team caps and goals as of 21 August 2026

Carla Valentina Guerrero Puelle (Note: In this Spanish name, the first or paternal surname is Guerrero and the second or maternal family name is Puelle.) (born 23 December 1987) is a Chilean former footballer who played as a defender. She is nicknamed "La Jefa" (The Boss) due to her strong leadership in the pitch.

== Career ==
In 2012, she won the Copa Libertadores with Colo-Colo.

In 2018, Guerrero joined Colombian club Santa Fe.

She spent six consecutive seasons with Universidad de Chile from 2020 to 2025.

In January 2026, Guerrero joined Universidad de Concepción.

On 20 August 2026, Guerrero announced her retirement at the end of the 2026 season.

== International career ==
Guerrero represented the Chile national futsal team in the 2015 Copa América de Futsal Femenina.

== Personal life ==
Guerrero studied Physical Education at the Pontifical Catholic University of Valparaíso.

She is a Universidad de Chile supporter.

== Honors ==
Everton

- Primera División (1): 2009
- Copa Chile (1): 2009

Colo-Colo

- Primera División (13): 2010, 2011 Apertura, 2011 Clausura, 2012 Apertura, 2012 Clausura, 2013 Apertura, 2013 Clausura, 2014 Apertura, 2014 Clausura, 2015 Apertura, 2016 Clausura, 2017 Apertura, 2017 Clausura
- Copa de Campeonas (3): 2013, 2015, 2016
- Copa Libertadores (1): 2012

Universidad de Chile

- Primera División (1): 2021

Chile

- South American Games Silver medal: 2014
- Copa América Runner-up: 2018
- Torneio Internacional de Futebol Feminino: 2019
- Turkish Women's Cup: 2020

Individual

- IFFHS CONMEBOL Woman Team of the Decade 2011–2020
- Premios Contragolpe - Best Defender: 2021
- Premios Contragolpe - Career Award: 2021
- Premios Contragolpe - Ideal Team: 2021
