= Venezuela women's national futsal team =

Venezuela
- Nickname(s): La Vinotinto (The Wine Red)
- Association: Venezuelan Football Federation; Federación Venezolana de Fútbol
- Confederation: CONMEBOL (South America)
- FIFA code: VEN
- FIFA ranking: 22 (24 September 2026)
- Highest FIFA ranking: 19 (May 2024)
- Lowest FIFA ranking: 20 (October 2024)
| Home colours | Away colours |

First international
- Ecuador 2–3 Venezuela (Guayaquil, Ecuador; 6 November 2007)

Biggest win
- Venezuela 8–1 Malaysia (Oliveira de Azeméis, Portugal; 8 December 2012)

Biggest defeat
- Brazil 16–0 Venezuela (Oliveira de Azeméis, Portugal; 6 December 2012)

Copa América de Futsal Femenina
- Appearances: 7 (First in 2007)
- Best result: Third place (2007, 2009)

Women's Futsal World Tournament
- Appearances: 3 (First in 2010)
- Best result: Sixth place (2010)

The Venezuela women's national futsal team (Spanish: Selección femenina de futsal de Venezuela) represents Venezuela in international women's futsal, and is controlled by the Venezuelan Football Federation.

== History ==
Missing the inaugural edition of the Sudamericano de Futsal Femenino in 2005, Venezuela made their tournament debut in 2007. They played their first match against hosts Ecuador, securing a 3–2 victory. The team advanced to the semi-finals in their first appearance but fell to Brazil. They ultimately settled for bronze after defeating Uruguay in the third-place playoff.

Following the launch of the Women's Futsal World Tournament in 2010, Venezuela was invited to take part in the inaugural edition in Alcobendas, Spain, where they were eliminated in the group stage. Venezuela went on to participate in the next two editions of the tournament, finishing 7th and 9th, respectively.

In the 7th edition of the Copa América Femenina de Futsal in 2019, Venezuela failed to reach the semifinals for the first time in their history, after four previous appearances. They lost all their matches before securing a 9th-place finish with a victory over Chile.

After the inclusion of women's futsal in the 2022 South American Games, Venezuela participated in the inaugural edition, finishing fifth out of six teams. The team won only one match, defeating Chile.

At the 2023 ALBA Games, held in Caracas, the team faced Nicaragua and its B team in a three-team tournament, where they defeated Nicaragua 12–0.

== Results and fixtures ==
The following is a list of match results in the last 12 months, as well as any future matches that have been scheduled.

Legend

Win Draw Lose Fixture

== Players ==
=== Current squad ===
The following 14 players were called up to the squad for the 2023 Copa América de Futsal Femenina, held in Buenos Aires from September 24 to October 1, 2023.

| No. | Pos. | Player | Date of birth (age) | Club |
|---|---|---|---|---|
| 1 | GK | Marinel Arguinzones | 18 December 1992 (age 33) | (Brazilian Football Confederation) Celemaster |
| 12 | GK | Eliarsi Rivas | 23 August 2002 (age 24) | (Venezuelan Football Federation) Pumas |
| 5 | DF | Paola Ayala | 21 February 2001 (age 25) | (Venezuelan Football Federation) Tigres |
| 6 | DF | Lavinia Antequera | 16 July 1991 (age 35) | (Colombian Football Federation) Juventas |
| 10 | DF | Yilvi Conde | 19 November 1990 (age 35) | (Ecuadorian Football Federation) Cumanda Agua Lluvia |
| 2 | FW | Andreina Tovar | 23 August 2002 (age 24) | (Venezuelan Football Federation) Palacio Fajardo |
| 3 | FW | Glorimar Suárez | 7 January 1993 (age 33) | (Colombian Football Federation) Floridablanca |
| 4 | FW | Diócelis Núñez | 23 October 2004 (age 21) | (Venezuelan Football Federation) Crearte |
| 7 | FW | Daniela Rodríguez | 4 July 2000 (age 26) | (Venezuelan Football Federation) Pumas |
| 8 | FW | Carla Crespo | 13 December 2004 (age 21) | (Venezuelan Football Federation) Real Falcon |
| 9 | FW | Francheska Palencia | 19 April 1999 (age 27) | (Venezuelan Football Federation) Tigres |
| 11 | FW | Mariangela Magdaleno | 10 July 2001 (age 25) | (Argentine Football Association) San Lorenzo |
| 13 | FW | Génesis Vegas | 12 March 1992 (age 34) | (Royal Spanish Football Federation) Sala Zaragoza |
| 14 | FW | Yuhelmi Veloz | 11 August 1995 (age 31) | (Venezuelan Football Federation) Pumas |

== Competitive record ==
=== FIFA Futsal Women's World Cup ===
FIFA Futsal Women's World Cup record
| Year | Round | Position | Pld | W | D* | L | GF | GA |
|---|---|---|---|---|---|---|---|---|
| (Philippines) 2025 | Did not qualify | | | | | | | |
| Total | Best: — | 0/1 | — | — | — | — | — | — |

*Draws include knockout matches decided on penalty kicks.

=== Copa América de Futsal Femenina ===
Copa América de Futsal Femenina record
| Year | Round | Position | Pld | W | D* | L | GF | GA |
|---|---|---|---|---|---|---|---|---|
| (Brazil) 2005 | Did not enter | | | | | | | |
| (Ecuador) 2007 | Third place play-off | 3rd | 5 | 3 | 0 | 2 | 12 | 14 |
| (Brazil) 2009 | Third place play-off | 3rd | 4 | 2 | 0 | 2 | 15 | 21 |
| (Venezuela) 2011 | Third place play-off | 4th | 6 | 3 | 0 | 3 | 13 | 19 |
| (Uruguay) 2015 | Did not enter | | | | | | | |
| (Uruguay) 2017 | Third place play-off | 4th | 6 | 3 | 0 | 3 | 13 | 10 |
| (Paraguay) 2019 | Ninth place play-off | 9th | 5 | 1 | 0 | 4 | 6 | 10 |
| (Argentina) 2023 | Third place play-off | 4th | 6 | 3 | 1 | 2 | 14 | 13 |
| (Brazil) 2025 | Seventh place play-off | 7th | 5 | 2 | 0 | 3 | 9 | 11 |
| Total | Best: Third place | 7/9 | 37 | 17 | 1 | 19 | 82 | 98 |

*Draws include knockout matches decided on penalty kicks.

=== Women's Futsal World Tournament ===
Women's Futsal World Tournament record
| Year | Round | Position | Pld | W | D* | L | GF | GA |
|---|---|---|---|---|---|---|---|---|
| (Spain) 2010 | Group stage | 6th | 3 | 0 | 1 | 2 | 5 | 20 |
| (Brazil) 2011 | 7th place play-off | 7th | 5 | 2 | 0 | 3 | 15 | 30 |
| (Portugal) 2012 | 9th place play-off | 9th | 5 | 1 | 0 | 4 | 13 | 33 |
| (Spain) 2013 | Did not enter | | | | | | | |
| (Costa Rica) 2014 | Did not enter | | | | | | | |
| (Guatemala) 2015 | Did not enter | | | | | | | |
| Total | Best: Fourth place | 3/6 | 13 | 3 | 1 | 9 | 33 | 83 |

*Draws include knockout matches decided on penalty kicks.

== AMF-affiliated team ==
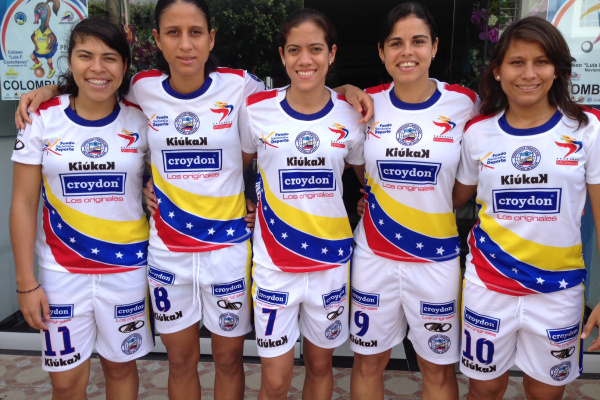
AMF-affiliated Venezuela women's national futsal team at the 2013 AMF Futsal Women's World Cup in Cali, Colombia

Alongside the FIFA-affiliated team, there is another team affiliated with the AMF, governed by the Federación Venezolana de Fútbol de Salón. This team participated in the AMF Futsal World Cup, with their best result to date coming at Colombia 2013, where they finished as runners-up after losing to host Colombia in the final.

=== AMF Futsal World Cup ===
AMF Futsal World Cup record
| Year | Round | Position | Pld | W | D* | L | GF | GA |
|---|---|---|---|---|---|---|---|---|
| (Catalonia) 2008 | Seventh place play-off | 8th | 5 | 1 | 0 | 4 | 14 | 18 |
| (Colombia) 2013 | Final | 2nd | 6 | 5 | 0 | 1 | 31 | 6 |
| (Catalonia) 2017 | Withdrew | | | | | | | |
| (Colombia) 2022 | Third place play-off | 3rd | 6 | 5 | 0 | 1 | 34 | 10 |
| Total | Best: Runners-up | 3/4 | 17 | 11 | 0 | 6 | 79 | 34 |

== See also ==
- Venezuela women's national football team
