= Daniela Panguinao =

Chilean footballer

Personal information
- Full name: Daniela Andrea Panguinao Cortés
- Date of birth: 25 October 1996 (age 30)
- Place of birth: Santiago, Chile
- Height: 1.53 m (5 ft 0 in)
- Position: Defender

Team information
- Current team: Independiente
- Number: 7

Youth career
- 2009–2011: Universidad de Chile (football)

Senior career*
Years	Team	Apps	(Gls)
2012–2016	Universidad de Chile (football)		
2018–2019	Crea Espacio		
2019	Coquimbo Unido		
2020	All Boys		
2021–	Independiente		

International career
2015	Chile U20 (football)		
2019–	Chile		
- * Club domestic league appearances and goals

Daniela Andrea Panguinao Cortés (born 25 October 1996) is a Chilean futsal player and former footballer who plays as a defender for Argentine Primera División club Independiente and the Chile national futsal team.

== Club career ==
Panguinao started playing football with Universidad de Chile in 2009. She left them a year after winning the 2016 Apertura, the first league title for the club.

Following Universidad de Chile, Panguinao played for futsal and five-a-side football clubs in Santiago like Crea Espacio with whom she won the 2019 national championship.

In 2019, Panguinao switched to futsal and joined Coquimbo Unido. She became the team captain, won the 2019 Apertura of the Chilean championship, was selected the best player of the tournament and competed at the 2019 Copa Libertadores.

In January 2020, Panguinao moved to Argentina and joined All Boys alongside her compatriots Florencia Pérez and Javiera Salvo. The next year, she switched to Independiente. She renewed with them for the 2025 season.

== International career ==
As a football player, Panguinao represented Chile at under-20 level in the 2015 South American Championship.

As a futsal player, Panguinao has represented the Chile senior team in the 2019, the 2023 and the 2025 Copa América Femenina.
