= Aída Camaño =

Uruguayan footballer (born 1984)

Personal information
- Full name: Aída Luisa Camaño Vieyto
- Date of birth: 7 May 1984 (age 42)
- Place of birth: Melo
- Height: 1.74 m (5 ft 8 1/2 in)
- Position: Defender

Team information
- Current team: Club Náutico (football), Malvín (futsal)

Senior career*
Years	Team	Apps	(Gls)
2002	Arachanas (Melo)		
2003–2009	Rampla Juniors		
2012–2013	Salus		
2014	Colón		
2015–2017	Arachanas (Melo)		
2015–2017	Basáñez (futsal)	22	(24)
2018–	Club Náutico	30	(13)
2019–	Malvín (futsal)	8	(20)

International career
2003–	Uruguay	12+	(0+)
- Uruguay (futsal)
- * Club domestic league appearances and goals

Aída Luisa Camaño Vieyto (born 7 May 1984) is a Uruguayan footballer who plays as a defender for Club Náutico (Carrasco y Punta Gorda) and the Uruguay women's national team. She also plays futsal for Club Malvín.

== International career ==
Camaño represented Uruguay at three Copa América Femenina editions (2003, 2006 and 2014), the 2007 Pan American Games and the 2017 Copa América Femenina de Futsal.
