= Nathalie Quezada =

Chilean footballer (born 1989)

Personal information
- Full name: Nathalie Alejandra Quezada Altamirano
- Date of birth: 21 June 1989 (age 37)
- Place of birth: Santiago, Chile
- Position: Striker

Team information
- Current team: Cobresal

Senior career*
Years	Team	Apps	(Gls)
- Universidad de Chile
2008	Unión La Calera		
2009–2012	Colo-Colo		
2013	Everton		
2014–2020	Colo-Colo		
2021	Deportes Puerto Montt		
2022–2023	Palestino		
2024–	Cobresal		

International career
2006–	Chile	15	(5)
2008	Chile U20		
2017	Chile (futsal)		
Medal record
Women's football
Representing Chile
South American Games
Silver medal – second place	2014 Santiago	Team
- * Club domestic league appearances and goals

Nathalie Alejandra Quezada Altamirano is a Chilean football striker, currently playing for Cobresal.

== Club career ==
She played the 2011 Copa Libertadores's final.

In 2021, she played for Deportes Puerto Montt. in the Chilean Championship.

In 2024, she joined Cobresal from Palestino.

== International career ==
She has been a member of the Chile national team, taking part in the 2006 and 2010 South American Championships. She also was a member of the Chile squad that won the silver medal at the 2014 South American Games.

As an Under-19 international she played the 2008 U-20 World Cup.

As a futsal player, she represented the Chile national team in the 2017 Copa América.

== Honours ==
Chile

- South American Games Silver medal: 2014
