= Sudamericano Femenino (disambiguation) =

The Sudamericano Femenino or Copa América Femenina is a women's football tournament held in South America.

(Campeonato) Sudamericano Femenino may also refer to:

- South American Under-20 Women's Football Championship
- South American Under-17 Women's Football Championship
- Copa América Femenina de Futsal
- Women's South American Volleyball Championship
- South American Basketball Championship for Women
