= Ecuador women's national futsal team =

Ecuador
- Shirt badge/Association crest
- Nickname(s): La Tricolor
- Association: Ecuadorian Football Federation
- Confederation: CONMEBOL (South America)
- Head coach: Darío Meza
- FIFA code: ECU
- FIFA ranking: 25 ▲1 (24 September 2026)
- Highest FIFA ranking: 30 (May–October 2024)
- Lowest FIFA ranking: 30 (May–October 2024)
Home colours	Away colours

First international
- Argentina 0–1 Ecuador (Barueri, Brazil; 8 November 2005)

Biggest win
- Peru 1–8 Ecuador (Buenos Aires, Argentina; 30 September 2023)

Biggest defeat
- Ecuador 0–13 Brazil (Barueri, Brazil; 13 November 2005); Brazil 13–0 Ecuador (Luque, Paraguay; 17 December 2019)

AMF World Cup
- Appearances: 1 (First in 2022)
- Best result: Quarter-finals (2022)

Copa América de Futsal Femenina
- Appearances: 7 (First in 2005)
- Best result: Runners-up (2005)

The Ecuador women's national futsal team (Spanish: Selección femenina de futsal de Ecuador) represents Ecuador in international futsal competitions and is governed by the Ecuadorian Football Federation (FEF).

== History ==
The team was established in 2005 ahead of the inaugural Sudamericano de Futsal Femenino, held in Barueri, Brazil. They made their debut in the tournament on 8 November 2005, playing their first international match against Argentina, in which they won 1–0. Ecuador remained unbeaten until the final, where they were defeated 13–0 by Brazil, finishing as runners-up. Due to limited international competition, Ecuador primarily competed in the Sudamericano de Futsal Femenino, hosting the tournament in 2007 and regularly participating in subsequent editions, except in 2009 and 2015. In the 2023 edition, they recorded their largest victory, defeating Peru 8–1 to secure ninth place.

In 2022, an AMF-affiliated national team was formed and made its debut at the 2022 AMF Futsal Women's World Cup in Colombia. governed by Pichincha Futsalón, the team topped its group and advanced to the quarter-finals, where they lost to Catalonia. However, they won their next two matches on penalties to secure a fifth-place finish.

On 6 May 2024, FIFA released its inaugural world ranking, placing the team 30th globally and 8th in South America.

== Results and fixtures ==
The following is a list of match results in the last 12 months, as well as any future matches that have been scheduled.
Legend

Win Draw Lose Fixture

== Players ==
=== Current squad ===
The following 14 players have been called up for the 2025 Copa América de Futsal Femenina from 22 to 30 March 2025.

No.	Pos.	Player	Date of birth (age)	Club
1	GK	Darla Lara	22 October 2006 (age 19)	(Ecuadorian Football Federation) Unión Española
2	DF	Ingrid Rodríguez	24 November 1991 (age 34)	Unattached
3	DF	Kelly Bone	22 December 1997 (age 28)	(Ecuadorian Football Federation) La Unión
4	MF	Tammy Chillambo	8 July 2000 (age 26)	Unattached
5	FW	Sara Garcés	25 February 2002 (age 24)	Unattached
6	FW	Jessica Quizhpilema	8 February 2001 (age 25)	(Ecuadorian Football Federation) PKS Futsal
7	DF	Iris Reyes	19 January 2001 (age 25)	Unattached
8	DF	Daniela Fernández	11 July 2001 (age 25)	(Ecuadorian Football Federation) La Unión
9	FW	Andrea Ochoa	11 February 1998 (age 28)	(Ecuadorian Football Federation) G13 F.C.
10	MF	Cinthia Bone	17 July 2000 (age 26)	Unattached
11	MF	Ana Ñacashag	1 July 2002 (age 24)	Unattached
12	GK	Ana Villarreal	14 November 2002 (age 23)	Unattached
13	MF	Emily Tomala	12 December 1997 (age 28)	Unattached
14	MF	Karol Guzhñay	12 July 2005 (age 21)	(Ecuadorian Football Federation) PKS Futsal

== Competitive record ==
=== FIFA Futsal Women's World Cup ===
FIFA Futsal Women's World Cup record
Year	Position	Pld	W	D*	L	GF	GA
(Philippines) 2025	Did not qualify						
Total	0/1	—	—	—	—	—	—

*Draws include knockout matches decided on penalty kicks.

=== Copa América de Futsal Femenina ===
Copa América de Futsal Femenina record
Year	Position	Pld	W	D*	L	GF	GA
(Brazil) 2005	2nd	4	3	0	1	13	17
(Ecuador) 2007	5th	4	3	0	1	10	5
(Brazil) 2009	Did not enter						
(Venezuela) 2011	7th	4	1	0	3	15	26
(Uruguay) 2015	Did not enter						
(Uruguay) 2017	5th	5	3	0	2	15	28
(Paraguay) 2019	7th	5	2	1	2	11	28
(Argentina) 2023	9th	5	1	0	4	15	29
(Brazil) 2025	To be determined						
Total	7/7	27	13	1	13	79	133

*Draws include knockout matches decided on penalty kicks.

== See also ==
- Ecuador women's national football team
