= Aline Guedes =

Brazilian footballer (born 1990)

Guedes
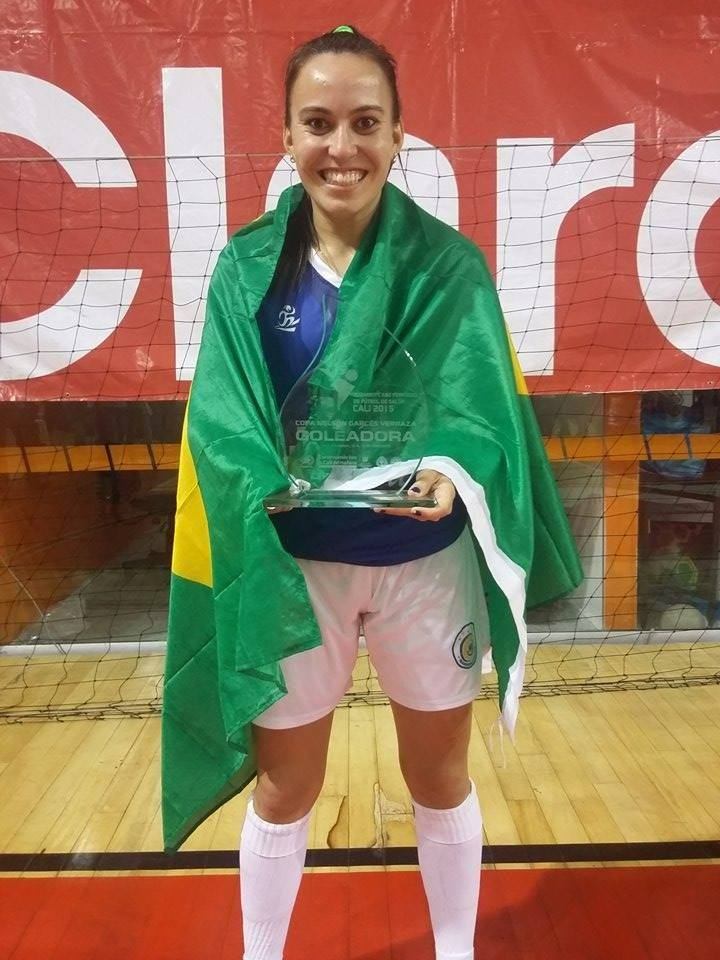
- Guedes in 2015

Personal information
- Full name: Aline Guedes Santiago
- Date of birth: January 9, 1990 (age 36)
- Place of birth: Belo Horizonte, Minas Gerais, Brazil
- Position: Attacking midfielder

Team information
- Current team: Itabirito-MG
- Number: 11

International career
Years	Team	Apps	(Gls)
2015	Brazil		

Aline Guedes Santiago (born January 9, 1990) commonly known as Aline Guedes or simply Guedes, is a Brazilian professional footballer who plays as an attacking midfielder for Itabirito-MG as an attacking midfielder.

Guedes played as a goalkeeper representing the Brazilian national futsal team at the 2015 South American Women's Futsal Championship (Copa América de Futsal Femenina).

== Honours ==
- Campeonato Brasileiro de Futebol 7: 2015
- Campeonato Brasileiro de Futebol 7: 2025
- Campeonato Carioca de Futebol: 2018
- Campeonato Mineiro de Futebol Feminino: 2013, 2016, 2020 and 2021.
- Copa Pampulha de Futebol 7: 2017
- Copa BH de Futebol: 2010, 2011, 2015 e 2016
- Copa FFS-MG de Futebol de Salão: 2015
- Copa Brasil de Futebol de Salão: 2014
- Campeonato Metropolitano de Futsal-MG: 2014
- Copa Centenário de Futebol: 2008, 2010 and 2013
