= Ana María Rivera =

Bolivian footballer and futsal player (born 1993)

Personal information
- Date of birth: 23 October 1993 (age 33)
- Height: 1.61 m (5 ft 3 in)
- Positions: Forward; midfielder

Senior career*
Years	Team	Apps	(Gls)
- San Martín de Porres
- FC Leonas

International career^{‡}
2013	Bolivia U20		
2014–2018	Bolivia	7	(0)
2018	Bolivia (futsal)		
Medal record
Women's futsal
Representing Bolivia
South American Games
Bronze medal – third place	2018 Cochabamba	Team
- * Club domestic league appearances and goals ‡ National team caps and goals as of 13 April 2018

Ana María Rivera (born 23 October 1993) is a Bolivian futsal player and a footballer who plays as a forward for the Bolivia women's national team.

== Early life ==
Rivera hails from the Tarija Department.

== Club career ==
=== San Martín de Porres ===
Rivera won the Bolivian football championship in 2016.

== International career ==
Rivera represented Bolivia at the 2013 Bolivarian Games. At senior level, she played two Copa América Femenina editions (2014 and 2018).

As a futsal player, Rivera won the bronze medal with Bolivia at the 2018 South American Games.
