= Bolivia women's national futsal team =

Bolivia
- Association: Bolivian Football Federation
- Confederation: CONMEBOL (South America)
- Head coach: Mauricio Arnéz
- FIFA code: BOL
- FIFA ranking: 35 ▼1 (24 September 2026)
- Highest FIFA ranking: 27 (May–October 2024)
- Lowest FIFA ranking: 27 (May–October 2024)
Home colours	Away colours

First international
- Peru 3–1 Bolivia (Campinas, Brazil; 3 September 2009)

Biggest win
- Bolivia 5–0 Chile (Asunción, Paraguay; 14 October 2022)

Biggest defeat
- Bolivia 0–14 Brazil (Buenos Aires, Argentina; 27 September 2023)

AMF World Cup
- Appearances: 1 (First in 2022)
- Best result: Group stage (2022)

Copa América de Futsal Femenina
- Appearances: 5 (First in 2009)
- Best result: Sixth place (2009, 2019)

The Bolivia women's national futsal team (Spanish: Selección nacional femenina de futsal de Bolivia) represents Bolivia in international futsal competitions and is controlled by the Federación Boliviana de Fútbol (FBF).

== History ==
After missing the first two editions of the Sudamericano Femenino de Futsal, Bolivia made their debut in the tournament in 2009, held in Campinas, Brazil. On 3 September 2009, they played their first-ever match, losing 1–3 to Peru. Despite a heavy defeat to Colombia in their second game, Bolivia bounced back to claim their first win against Uruguay, ultimately finishing sixth overall. Following the tournament, the team went on an eight-year hiatus before returning for the sixth edition of the newly rebranded Copa América de Futsal Femenina in Las Piedras, Uruguay. There, La Verde went winless, recording two draws in five matches and finishing in eighth place.

In 2018, Bolivia hosted the South American Games, which marked the debut of women’s futsal in the multi-sport event. Playing on home soil, the team secured a bronze medal — a feat they repeated at the 2022 edition in Paraguay, where they recorded their biggest win to date with a 5–0 victory over Chile.

== Results and fixtures ==
The following is a list of match results in the last 12 months, as well as any future matches that have been scheduled.
Legend

Win Draw Lose Fixture

== Players ==
=== Current squad ===
The following 14 players were named in La Verde's squad for the 2025 Copa América de Futsal Femenina, scheduled to take place from 22 to 30 March 2025.

No.	Pos.	Player	Date of birth (age)	Club
1	GK	Kimberly López	17 May 2000 (age 26)	(Bolivian Football Federation) Muriel
2	GK	Desiree Nava	7 February 2006 (age 20)	(Bolivian Football Federation) CRE
3	FW	Briseyda Orellana	1 June 2004 (age 22)	(Bolivian Football Federation) Muriel
4	MF	Sonia Turihuano	28 November 1991 (age 34)	(Bolivian Football Federation) Calderón Criters
5	MF	Alexandra Montalvo	1 November 1996 (age 29)	(Bolivian Football Federation) Always Ready
6	DF	Dayana Jiménez	19 October 1998 (age 27)	(Bolivian Football Federation) Muriel
7	FW	Yoselin Portales	4 October 1996 (age 30)	(Bolivian Football Federation) Always Ready
8	DF	Ingrid Siles	11 August 1998 (age 28)	(Bolivian Football Federation) Muriel
9	MF	Karla Ticona	29 June 1995 (age 31)	(Argentine Football Association) Racing Club
10	DF	Martha Chura	24 August 1996 (age 30)	(Bolivian Football Federation) Muriel
11	MF	María Gálvez	13 August 2000 (age 26)	(Bolivian Football Federation) Always Ready
12	GK	Ruth Copa	27 February 1996 (age 30)	(Bolivian Football Federation) Calderón Criters
13	FW	Ana Rojas	17 July 1997 (age 29)	(Bolivian Football Federation) Muriel
14	MF	Wendy Baltazar	1 May 1999 (age 27)	(Bolivian Football Federation) Muriel

== Competitive record ==
=== FIFA Futsal Women's World Cup ===
FIFA Futsal Women's World Cup record
Year	Position	Pld	W	D*	L	GF	GA
(Philippines) 2025	Did not qualify						
Total	0/1	—	—	—	—	—	—

*Draws include knockout matches decided on penalty kicks.

=== Copa América de Futsal Femenina ===
Copa América de Futsal Femenina record
Year	Position	Pld	W	D*	L	GF	GA
(Brazil) 2005	Did not enter						
(Ecuador) 2007	Did not enter						
(Brazil) 2009	6th	4	1	0	3	7	22
(Venezuela) 2011	Did not enter						
(Uruguay) 2015	Did not enter						
(Uruguay) 2017	8th	5	0	2	3	7	20
(Paraguay) 2019	6th	5	2	0	3	9	14
(Argentina) 2023	7th	5	2	0	3	8	24
(Brazil) 2025	9th	5	1	0	4	8	19
Total	5/9	24	6	2	16	39	99

*Draws include knockout matches decided on penalty kicks.

=== South American Games ===
Futsal at the South American Games record
Year	Position	Pld	W	D*	L	GF	GA
(Bolivia) 2018	3rd	4	2	0	2	6	6
(Paraguay) 2022	3rd	5	2	1	2	11	9
(Argentina) 2026	To be determined						
Total	2/2	9	4	1	4	17	15

== See also ==
- Bolivia women's national football team
