= 2018 South American Under-20 Women's Futsal Championship =

CONMEBOL Sudamericano Sub-20 Femenino de Futsal Chile 2018
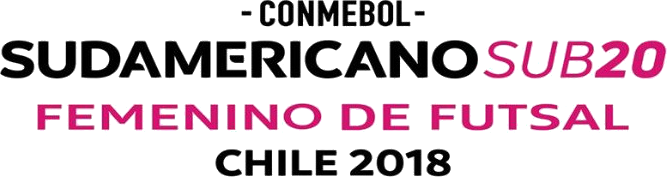
- 2018 South American Under-20 Women's Futsal Championship logo

Tournament details
- Host country: Chile
- City: Santiago
- Dates: 21–28 October
- Teams: 10 (from 1 confederation)
- Venue: 1 (in 1 host city)

Final positions
- Champions: Brazil (2nd title)
- Runners-up: Paraguay
- Third place: Uruguay
- Fourth place: Colombia

Tournament statistics
- Matches played: 27
- Goals scored: 134 (4.96 per match)
- Top scorer: (Argentina) Flavia Lorena Benítez (11 goals)
- Best player: (Brazil) Beatriz Souza Fernandes
- Best goalkeeper: (Brazil) Jhennifer Aparecida De Oliveira Camargo
- Fair play award: Uruguay

The 2018 South American Under-20 Women's Futsal Championship is the 2nd edition of the South American Under-20 Women's Futsal Championship (Spanish: CONMEBOL Sudamericano Sub-20 Femenino de Futsal), the biennial international youth futsal championship organised by the CONMEBOL for the women's under-20 national teams of South America. The tournament is held in Santiago, Chile between 21–28 October 2018.

== Teams ==
All ten CONMEBOL member national teams entered the tournament.

- Argentina
- Bolivia
- Brazil (title holders)
- Chile (hosts)
- Colombia
- Ecuador
- Paraguay
- Peru
- Uruguay
- Venezuela

== Venues ==
All matches are played in one venue: Polideportivo del Estadio Nacional in Santiago.

== Draw ==
The draw of the tournament was held on 5 October 2018. The ten teams were drawn into two groups of five teams. The defending champions Brazil and the hosts Chile were seeded into Groups A and B respectively, while the remaining teams were placed into four "pairing pots" according to their results in the 2016 South American Under-20 Women's Futsal Championship: Colombia–Paraguay, Uruguay–Bolivia, Peru–Venezuela, Ecuador–Argentina.

== Group stage ==
All times are local, CLST (UTC−3).

=== Group A ===
Pos	Team	Pld	W	D	L	GF	GA	GD	Pts	Qualification
1	Brazil	4	4	0	0	24	2	+22	12	Semi-finals
2	Paraguay	4	2	1	1	16	8	+8	7	Semi-finals
3	Argentina	4	2	1	1	11	7	+4	7	Fifth place play-off
4	Bolivia	4	1	0	3	4	25	−21	3	Seventh place play-off
5	Venezuela	4	0	0	4	3	16	−13	0	Ninth place play-off

Source: CONMEBOL
21 October 2018
12:00

Paraguay	2–2	Argentina
	Report

Polideportivo del Estadio Nacional, Santiago
21 October 2018
14:00

Brazil	6–0	Venezuela
	Report

Polideportivo del Estadio Nacional, Santiago

22 October 2018
14:00

Brazil	10–0	Bolivia
	Report

Polideportivo del Estadio Nacional, Santiago
22 October 2018
16:00

Venezuela	1–2	Argentina
	Report

Polideportivo del Estadio Nacional, Santiago

23 October 2018
14:00

Paraguay	5–1	Venezuela
	Report

Polideportivo del Estadio Nacional, Santiago
23 October 2018
16:00

Argentina	6–1	Bolivia
	Report

Polideportivo del Estadio Nacional, Santiago

24 October 2018
14:00

Brazil	3–1	Argentina
	Report

Polideportivo del Estadio Nacional, Santiago
24 October 2018
16:00

Paraguay	8–0	Bolivia
	Report

Polideportivo del Estadio Nacional, Santiago

25 October 2018
14:00

Bolivia	3–1	Venezuela
	Report

Polideportivo del Estadio Nacional, Santiago
25 October 2018
16:00

Brazil	5–1	Paraguay
	Report

Polideportivo del Estadio Nacional, Santiago

=== Group B ===
Pos	Team	Pld	W	D	L	GF	GA	GD	Pts	Qualification
1	Colombia	4	3	1	0	13	4	+9	10	Semi-finals
2	Uruguay	4	3	1	0	7	3	+4	10	Semi-finals
3	Ecuador	4	1	0	3	4	7	−3	3	Fifth place play-off
4	Chile (H)	4	1	0	3	4	9	−5	3	Seventh place play-off
5	Peru	4	1	0	3	3	8	−5	3	Ninth place play-off

Source: CONMEBOL
(H) Hosts
21 October 2018
16:00

Colombia	2–0	Ecuador
	Report

Polideportivo del Estadio Nacional, Santiago
21 October 2018
18:00

Chile	0–2	Peru
	Report

Polideportivo del Estadio Nacional, Santiago

22 October 2018
18:00

Peru	1–3	Ecuador
	Report

Polideportivo del Estadio Nacional, Santiago
22 October 2018
20:00

Chile	0–2	Uruguay
	Report

Polideportivo del Estadio Nacional, Santiago

23 October 2018
18:00

Colombia	4–0	Peru
	Report

Polideportivo del Estadio Nacional, Santiago
23 October 2018
20:00

Uruguay	2–1	Ecuador
	Report

Polideportivo del Estadio Nacional, Santiago

24 October 2018
18:00

Colombia	2–2	Uruguay
	Report

Polideportivo del Estadio Nacional, Santiago
24 October 2018
20:00

Chile	2–0	Ecuador
	Report

Polideportivo del Estadio Nacional, Santiago

25 October 2018
18:00

Uruguay	1–0	Peru
	Report

Polideportivo del Estadio Nacional, Santiago
25 October 2018
20:00

Chile	2–5	Colombia
	Report

Polideportivo del Estadio Nacional, Santiago

== Knockout stage ==
=== Bracket ===
Semi-finals
27 October
Colombia	1
Paraguay	2
27 October
Brazil	6
Uruguay	2

Final
28 October
Paraguay	1
Brazil	8
Third place
28 October
Colombia	1
Uruguay	2

Fifth place
28 October
Argentina	6
Ecuador	3

Seventh place
28 October
Bolivia	1
Chile	9

Ninth place
27 October
Venezuela	0
Peru	3

=== Semi-finals ===
27 October 2018
18:00

Colombia	1–2	Paraguay
	Report

Polideportivo del Estadio Nacional, Santiago
27 October 2018
20:00

Brazil	6–2	Uruguay
	Report

Polideportivo del Estadio Nacional, Santiago

=== Ninth place play-off ===
27 October 2018
16:00

Venezuela	0–3	Peru
	Report

Polideportivo del Estadio Nacional, Santiago

=== Seventh place play-off ===
28 October 2018
12:00

Bolivia	1–9	Chile
	Report

Polideportivo del Estadio Nacional, Santiago

=== Fifth place play-off ===
28 October 2018
14:00

Argentina	6–3	Ecuador
	Report

Polideportivo del Estadio Nacional, Santiago

=== Third place play-off ===
28 October 2018
16:00

Colombia	1–2	Uruguay
	Report

Polideportivo del Estadio Nacional, Santiago

=== Final ===
28 October 2018
18:00

Paraguay	1–8	Brazil
	Report

Polideportivo del Estadio Nacional, Santiago

== Final ranking ==
Rank	Team
1st place, gold medalist(s)	Brazil
2nd place, silver medalist(s)	Paraguay
3rd place, bronze medalist(s)	Uruguay
4	Colombia
5	Argentina
6	Ecuador
7	Chile
8	Bolivia
9	Peru
10	Venezuela
