= Futsal World Cup =

Futsal World Cup may refer to:

- FIFA Futsal World Cup
- AMF Futsal World Cup
