= 2024 South American Under-20 Women's Futsal Championship =

CONMEBOL Sub 20 Femenino de Futsal Paraguay 2024

Tournament details
- Host country: Paraguay
- City: Luque
- Dates: 26 October – 3 November
- Teams: 10 (from 1 confederation)
- Venue(s): 1 (in 1 host city)

Final positions
- Champions: Colombia (1st title)
- Runners-up: Brazil
- Third place: Argentina
- Fourth place: Uruguay

Tournament statistics
- Matches played: 27
- Goals scored: 114 (4.22 per match)

The 2024 South American Under-20 Women's Futsal Championship was the 4th edition of the South American Under-20 Women's Futsal Championship (Spanish: CONMEBOL Sudamericano Sub-20 Femenino de Futsal), the biennial international youth futsal championship organised by the CONMEBOL for the women's under-20 national teams of South America. The tournament was held in Luque, Paraguay between 26 October and 3 November 2024.

== Teams ==
All ten CONMEBOL member national teams entered the tournament.

- Argentina
- Bolivia
- Brazil (title holders)
- Chile
- Colombia
- Ecuador
- Paraguay (hosts)
- Peru
- Uruguay
- Venezuela

== Venues ==
All matches are played in one venue: COP Arena in Luque.

== Draw ==
The draw of the tournament was held on 29 October 2024. The ten teams were drawn into two groups of five teams. The defending champions Brazil and the hosts Paraguay were seeded into Groups B and A respectively, while the remaining teams were placed into four "pairing pots" according to their results in the 2022 South American Under-20 Women's Futsal Championship: Colombia–Argentina, Ecuador–Uruguay, Venezuela–Bolivia, Chile–Peru.

== Group stage ==
All times are local, PYST (UTC−3).

=== Group A ===
Pos	Team	Pld	W	D	L	GF	GA	GD	Pts	Qualification
1	Argentina	4	3	1	0	12	2	+10	10	Semi-finals
2	Uruguay	4	2	1	1	10	9	+1	7	Semi-finals
3	Paraguay	4	1	3	0	10	5	+5	6	Fifth place play-off
4	Venezuela	4	1	1	2	6	5	+1	4	Seventh place play-off
5	Peru	4	0	0	4	5	22	−17	0	Ninth place play-off

Source: CONMEBOL
26 October 2024
16:45

Peru	3–5	Uruguay

COP Arena, Luque
26 October 2024
19:00

Paraguay	1–1	Venezuela

COP Arena, Luque
27 October 2024
16:45

Venezuela	0–1	Argentina

COP Arena, Luque
27 October 2024
19:00

Peru	1–6	Paraguay

COP Arena, Luque
28 October 2024
16:45

Venezuela	5–1	Peru

COP Arena, Luque
28 October 2024
19:00

Argentina	4–1	Uruguay

COP Arena, Luque
30 October 2024
16:45

Argentina	6–0	Peru

COP Arena, Luque
30 October 2024
19:00

Uruguay	2–2	Paraguay

COP Arena, Luque
31 October 2024
16:45

Uruguay	2–0	Venezuela

COP Arena, Luque
31 October 2024
19:00

Paraguay	1–1	Argentina

COP Arena, Luque

=== Group B ===
Pos	Team	Pld	W	D	L	GF	GA	GD	Pts	Qualification
1	Brazil (H)	4	4	0	0	19	0	+19	12	Semi-finals
2	Colombia	4	3	0	1	15	6	+9	9	Semi-finals
3	Chile	4	1	1	2	3	15	−12	4	Fifth place play-off
4	Chile	4	1	1	2	3	15	−12	4	Seventh place play-off
5	Ecuador	4	0	1	3	2	12	−10	1	Ninth place play-off

Source: CONMEBOL
(H) Hosts
26 October 2024
12:15

Chile	1–1	Ecuador

COP Arena, Luque
26 October 2024
14:30

Brazil	4–0	Bolivia

COP Arena, Luque
27 October 2024
12:15

Bolivia	1–3	Colombia

COP Arena, Luque
27 October 2024
14:30

Chile	0–8	Brazil

COP Arena, Luque
28 October 2024
12:15

Bolivia	0–1	Chile

COP Arena, Luque
28 October 2024
14:30

Colombia	6–0	Ecuador

COP Arena, Luque
30 October 2024
12:15

Colombia	6–1	Chile

COP Arena, Luque
30 October 2024
14:30

Ecuador	0–3	Brazil

COP Arena, Luque
31 October 2024
12:15

Ecuador	1–2	Bolivia

COP Arena, Luque
31 October 2024
14:30

Brazil	4–0	Colombia

COP Arena, Luque

== Knockout stage ==
=== Bracket ===
Semi-finals
2 November
Argentina	1
Colombia	2
2 November
Brazil	5
Uruguay	0

Final
3 November
Colombia (p)	1 (6)
Brazil	1 (5)
Third place
3 November
Argentina	3
Uruguay	1

Fifth place
3 November
Paraguay (p)	3 (4)
Chile	3 (2)

Seventh place
2 November
Venezuela	4
Bolivia	2

Ninth place
2 November
Peru	1
Ecuador	2

=== Ninth place ===
2 November 2024
11:15

Peru	1–2	Ecuador

COP Arena, Luque

=== Seventh place ===
2 November 2024
13:45

Venezuela	4–2	Bolivia

COP Arena, Luque

=== Semi-finals ===
2 November 2024
16:15

Argentina	1–2	Colombia

COP Arena, Luque
2 November 2024
19:00

Brazil	5–0	Uruguay

COP Arena, Luque

=== Fifth place ===
3 November 2024
11:45

Paraguay	3–3	Chile
Penalties
	4–2

COP Arena, Luque

=== Third place ===
3 November 2024
14:15

Argentina	3–1	Uruguay

COP Arena, Luque

=== Fifth place ===
3 November 2024
17:00

Colombia	1–1	Brazil
Penalties
	6–5

COP Arena, Luque

== Final ranking ==
Rank	Team
1st place, gold medalist(s)	Colombia
2nd place, silver medalist(s)	Brazil
3rd place, bronze medalist(s)	Argentina
4	Uruguay
5	Paraguay
6	Chile
7	Venezuela
8	Bolivia
9	Ecuador
10	Peru
