= Uruguay women's national futsal team =

Uruguay
- Nickname(s): Las Celestes, Charrúas
- Association: Asociación Uruguaya de Fútbol
- Confederation: CONMEBOL (South America)
- Head coach: Pablo Lamanna
- FIFA code: URU
- FIFA ranking: 13 (24 September 2026)
- Highest FIFA ranking: 16 (May 2024)
- Lowest FIFA ranking: 19 (October 2024)
Home colours	Away colours

First international
- Peru 2–4 Uruguay (Barueri, Brazil; 9 November 2005)

Biggest win
- Uruguay 7–2 Peru (Guayaquil, Ecuador; 6 November 2007); Uruguay 10–5 Peru (Buenos Aires, Argentina; 28 September 2023)

Biggest defeat
- Brazil 8–0 Uruguay (Luque, Paraguay; 14 December 2019)

AMF World Cup
- Appearances: 2 (First in 2013)
- Best result: Quarter-finals (2022)

Copa América de Futsal Femenina
- Appearances: 9 (First in 2005)
- Best result: Runners-up (2015)

The Uruguay women's national futsal team (Spanish: Selección Uruguaya de Futsal femenino) represents Uruguay in international futsal competitions and is governed by the Uruguayan Football Association (AUF).

== History ==
Since the inception of the Sudamericano de Futsal Femenino in 2005, Uruguay participated in every edition until 2011. The team finished fourth in the first two tournaments and played its first international match during the inaugural edition on 9 November 2005, securing a 4–2 victory over Peru. In the second edition, Uruguay reached the semifinals, recording its biggest win by defeating Peru 7–2 along the way.

After a four-year hiatus, the tournament returned to Uruguay in 2015, featuring six teams. Las Celestes achieved its best-ever performance, finishing as runners-up after defeating Argentina 4–0 in the semifinals but falling short in the final to Colombia.

== Results and fixtures ==
The following is a list of match results in the last 12 months, as well as any future matches that have been scheduled.
Legend

Win Draw Lose Fixture

== Players ==
=== Current squad ===
The following 14 players were called up to the squad for the 2025 Copa América de Futsal Femenina, held in Sorocaba from 22 to 30 March 2025.

No.	Pos.	Player	Date of birth (age)	Club
1	GK	Inés Lupano	17 October 1999 (age 26)	(Uruguayan Football Association) F5F Peñarol
12	GK	Victoria Pérez		(Uruguayan Football Association) F5F Racing
2	FP	Ailín Silvera	1 November 2004 (age 21)	(Uruguayan Football Association) F5F Bella Vista
3	FP	Antonella Perdomo		(Argentine Football Association) River Plate
4	FP	Shamila González	13 December 2000 (age 25)	(Uruguayan Football Association) F5F Peñarol
5	FP	Celeste Santana	2 January 2006 (age 20)	(Uruguayan Football Association) F5F Nacional
6	FP	Valentina Márquez	6 May 2006 (age 20)	(Uruguayan Football Association) F5F Nacional
7	FP	Stefany Suárez	13 August 1994 (age 32)	(Uruguayan Football Association) F5F Peñarol
8	FP	Jimena Álvez	1 September 1994 (age 32)	(Uruguayan Football Association) F5F Nacional
9	FP	Maura Scaletti	12 November 1994 (age 31)	(Royal Spanish Football Federation) I..E.S. Luis de Camoens
10	FP	Jennifer Clara	5 October 1993 (age 33)	(Uruguayan Football Association) F5F Nacional
11	FP	Naiara Ferrari	24 June 1998 (age 28)	(Uruguayan Football Association) F5F Peñarol
13	FP	Federica Silvera	13 February 1993 (age 33)	(Royal Spanish Football Federation) I..E.S. Luis de Camoens
14	FP	Fátima Villar	5 June 1997 (age 29)	(Royal Spanish Football Federation) I..E.S. Luis de Camoens

== Competitive record ==
=== FIFA Futsal Women's World Cup ===
FIFA Futsal Women's World Cup record
Year	Position	Pld	W	D*	L	GF	GA
(Philippines) 2025	Did not qualify						
Total	0/1	—	—	—	—	—	—

*Draws include knockout matches decided on penalty kicks.

=== Copa América de Futsal Femenina ===
Copa América de Futsal Femenina record
Year	Position	Pld	W	D*	L	GF	GA
(Brazil) 2005	4th	4	1	0	3	7	15
(Ecuador) 2007	4th	5	2	0	3	13	12
(Brazil) 2009	7th	4	0	0	4	6	14
(Venezuela) 2011	6th	5	2	0	3	8	12
(Uruguay) 2015	2nd	5	3	0	2	10	12
(Uruguay) 2017	6th	5	2	1	2	16	18
(Paraguay) 2019	5th	5	2	1	2	8	13
(Argentina) 2023	6th	5	2	0	3	13	16
(Brazil) 2025	To be determined						
Total	9/9	38	14	2	22	81	112

*Draws include knockout matches decided on penalty kicks.

== See also ==
- Uruguay women's national football team
