= Colombia women's national futsal team =

Colombia
- Nickname(s): Las Cafeteras (The Coffee Growers); Las Chicas Superpoderosas (The Powerpuff Girls)
- Association: FIFA: Federación Colombiana de Fútbol; AMF: Fecolfutsal
- Confederation: FIFA: CONMEBOL (South America); AMF: CSFS, CPFS, CONCACFUTSAL
- FIFA code: COL
- FIFA ranking: 8 ▼1 (8 May 2026)
Home colours	Away colours

First international
- FIFA; Argentina 1–4 Colombia (Guayaquil, Ecuador; 6 November 2007); AMF; Czech Republic 1–1 Colombia (Reus, Catalonia; 30 September 2008)

Biggest win
- FIFA; Bolivia 1–14 Colombia (Campinas, Brazil; 4 September 2009); AMF; South Africa 0–20 Colombia (Balaguer, Catalonia; 19 November 2017)

Biggest defeat
- FIFA; Colombia 1–8 Brazil (Maracay, Venezuela; 11 October 2011); Brazil 7–0 Colombia (Buenos Aires, Argentina; 30 September 2023); AMF; Brazil 5–2 Colombia (Balaguer, Catalonia; 24 November 2017)

AMF World Cup
- Appearances: 4 (First in 2008)
- Best result: Champions (2013, 2022)

South American Championship
- Appearances: 7 (First in 2007)
- Best result: Champions (2015)

The Colombia women's national futsal team represents Colombia in international women's futsal competitions. It is overseen by the Colombian Football Federation in FIFA competitions and by the Fecolfutsal in AMF competitions.

== Competitive record ==
*Draws include knockout matches decided on penalty kicks.
**Gold background colour indicates that the tournament was won.
***Red border colour indicates tournament was held on home soil.

Champions Runners-up Third Place Fourth place

=== AMF ===
==== Futsal Women's World Cup ====
Year	Round	Position	Pld	W	D*	L	GF	GA
(Catalonia) 2008	Third place	3rd	5	3	2	0	17	10
(Colombia) 2013	Champions	1st	6	6	0	0	49	2
(Catalonia) 2017	Third place	3rd	5	4	0	1	39	8
(Colombia) 2022	Champions	1st	6	6	0	0	55	0
Total	Champions	4/4	22	19	2	1	160	20

=== FIFA ===
==== FIFA Futsal Women's World Cup ====
Year	Round	Position	Pld	W	D*	L	GF	GA
(Philippines) 2025	Quarter-finals	7th	4	2	0	2	8	10
Total	Quarter-finals	1/1	4	2	0	2	8	10

==== Copa América de Futsal Femenina ====
Year	Round	Position	Pld	W	D*	L	GF	GA
(Brazil) 2005	Did not Enter							
(Ecuador) 2007	Runners-up	2nd	4	2	0	2	9	12
(Brazil) 2009	Runners-up	2nd	5	4	0	1	34	13
(Venezuela) 2011	First Round	5th	3	1	0	2	9	15
(Uruguay) 2015	Champions	1st	5	5	0	0	30	8
(Uruguay) 2017	Runners-up	2nd	6	3	1	2	19	15
(Paraguay) 2019	Third place	3rd	6	4	1	1	13	11
(Argentina) 2023	Third place	3rd	6	3	1	2	13	12
(Brazil) 2025	Third place	3rd	6	3	2	1	20	11
Total	Champions	8/9	41	25	5	11	147	97

== Colombia women's national under-20 futsal team ==
The Colombia women's national under-20 futsal team participates in the South American Women's Under-20 Futsal Championship.

=== South American Women's Under-20 Futsal Championship ===
*Draws include knockout matches decided on penalty kicks.
**Gold background colour indicates that the tournament was won.
***Red border colour indicates tournament was held on home soil.

Champions Runners-up Third Place Fourth place

Year	Round	Position	Pld	W	D*	L	GF	GA
(Paraguay) 2016	Runners-up	2nd	5	4	0	1	19	6
(Chile) 2018	Fourth place	4th	6	3	1	2	15	8
(Brazil) 2022	Runners-up	2nd	6	5	0	1	13	5
(Paraguay) 2024	Champions	1st	6	4	1	1	18	8
Total	Champions	4/4	23	16	2	5	65	27

== Honours ==
=== CONMEBOL ===
- South American Women's Futsal Championship:
  - Champions (1): 2015
  - Runners-up (3): 2007, 2009, 2017
- South American Games:
  - Champions (1): 2018 Cochabamba

=== AMF ===
- AMF Futsal Women's World Cup:
  - Champions (2): 2013, 2022
  - Third place (2): 2008, 2017

== See also ==
- Colombia national futsal team
