= 2017 Copa América Femenina de Futsal =

2017 Copa América de Futsal
CONMEBOL Copa América Femenina de Futsal Uruguay 2017

Tournament details
- Host country: Uruguay
- City: Las Piedras
- Dates: 22–29 November
- Teams: 10 (from 1 confederation)
- Venue: 1 (in 1 host city)

Final positions
- Champions: Brazil (5th title)
- Runners-up: Colombia
- Third place: Argentina
- Fourth place: Venezuela

Tournament statistics
- Matches played: 27
- Goals scored: 169 (6.26 per match)

The 2017 CONMEBOL Copa América Femenina de Futsal was the 6th edition of the Copa América Femenina de Futsal, the international futsal championship under FIFA rules organised by CONMEBOL for the women's national teams of South America. The tournament was held in Las Piedras, Uruguay, between 22 and 29 November 2017.

== Teams ==
All ten CONMEBOL member national teams entered the tournament.

Team	Appearance	Previous best top-4 performance
Argentina	6th	Runners-up (2011)
Bolivia	2nd	None
Brazil	5th	Champions (2005, 2007, 2009, 2011)
Chile	3rd	Third place (2015)
Colombia (holders)	5th	Champions (2015)
Ecuador	4th	Runners-up (2005)
Paraguay	4th	Third place (2011)
Peru	6th	Fourth place (2009)
Uruguay (hosts)	6th	Runners-up (2015)
Venezuela	4th	Third place (2007, 2009)

== Venues ==
All matches are played in one venue: Polideportivo de Las Piedras in Las Piedras.

== Draw ==
The draw of the tournament was held on 1 November 2017, 19:00 UYT (UTC−3), at the headquarters of the Uruguayan Football Association in Montevideo. The ten teams were drawn into two groups of five teams. The hosts Uruguay and the defending champions Colombia were seeded into Groups A and B respectively, while the remaining teams were placed into four "pairing pots" according to their results in the 2015 Copa América Femenina de Futsal (if they did not participate, a statistical ranking of earlier tournaments were used for seeding): Chile–Argentina, Paraguay–Peru, Brazil–Venezuela, Bolivia–Ecuador.

== Squads ==
Each team had to submit a squad of 14 players, including a minimum of two goalkeepers (Regulations Article 4.1).

== Match officials ==
A total of 17 referees were appointed for the tournament.

== Group stage ==
The top two teams of each group advance to the semi-finals, while the teams in third, fourth and fifth advance to the fifth place, seventh place, and ninth place play-offs respectively. The teams are ranked according to points (3 points for a win, 1 point for a draw, 0 points for a loss). If tied on points, tiebreakers are applied in the following order (Regulations Article 6.2):

1. Results in head-to-head matches between tied teams (points, goal difference, goals scored);
2. Goal difference in all matches;
3. Goals scored in all matches;
4. Drawing of lots.

All times are local, UYT (UTC−3).

=== Group A ===
Pos	Team	Pld	W	D	L	GF	GA	GD	Pts	Qualification
1	Venezuela	4	3	0	1	12	3	+9	9 (Note: Head-to-head result: Argentina 1–2 Venezuela.)	Knockout stage
2	Argentina	4	3	0	1	19	5	+14	9	Knockout stage
3	Uruguay (H)	4	2	1	1	12	13	−1	7	Fifth place play-off
4	Bolivia	4	0	2	2	6	14	−8	2	Seventh place play-off
5	Peru	4	0	1	3	5	19	−14	1	Ninth place play-off

Source: CONMEBOL
(H) Hosts
Notes:
22 November 2017
17:00

Argentina	4–1	Bolivia
Carina Núñez 2', 3'; Brusca 22', 38'	Report	Morón 18'

Polideportivo de Las Piedras, Las Piedras
22 November 2017
21:00

Uruguay	6–4	Peru
Ramírez 2'; Fátima Villar 10'; Silvera 16', 33', 36'; Mariana González 18'	Report	Vásquez 8'; Dorador 23', 28'; Mariana González 39' (o.g.)

Polideportivo de Las Piedras, Las Piedras

23 November 2017
17:00

Peru	1–1	Bolivia
Fontela 27'	Report	Gálvez 24'

Polideportivo de Las Piedras, Las Piedras
23 November 2017
21:00

Uruguay	1–0	Venezuela
Ramírez 33'	Report

Polideportivo de Las Piedras, Las Piedras

24 November 2017
17:00

Venezuela	6–1	Bolivia
Barbara Sánchez 3', 17'; Lavinia Antequera 5', 31', 38'; Kathleen Rosales 12'	Report	María Galvez 30'

Polideportivo de Las Piedras, Las Piedras
24 November 2017
21:00

Argentina	8–0	Peru
? ?'; ? ?'; ? ?'; ? ?'; ? ?'; ? ?'; ? ?'; ? ?'	Report

Polideportivo de Las Piedras, Las Piedras

25 November 2017
17:00

Argentina	1–2	Venezuela
Blanco 39'		Helianny Revilla 18'; Zambrano 37'

Polideportivo de Las Piedras, Las Piedras
25 November 2017
21:00

Bolivia	3–3	Uruguay
María Galvez 4'; Ivonne Nina 23'; Morón 39'		Mariana González 21'; Diane Alvez 24'; Birizamberri 34'

Polideportivo de Las Piedras, Las Piedras

26 November 2017
17:00

Peru	0–4	Venezuela
	Report	Yilvi Conde 17', 18'; Helliany Revilla 33'; Lavinia Antequera 38'

Polideportivo de Las Piedras, Las Piedras
26 November 2017
21:00

Uruguay	2–6	Argentina
Diane Alvez 6'; Brusca 38' (o.g.)	Report	Delfina Fernández 6'; Carina Núñez 10'; Benítez 11', 17', 30'; Sol Dominguez 34'

Polideportivo de Las Piedras, Las Piedras

=== Group B ===
Pos	Team	Pld	W	D	L	GF	GA	GD	Pts	Qualification
1	Brazil	4	4	0	0	35	1	+34	12	Knockout stage
2	Colombia	4	2	1	1	15	11	+4	7	Knockout stage
3	Ecuador	4	2	0	2	9	24	−15	6	Fifth place play-off
4	Paraguay	4	1	1	2	10	17	−7	4	Seventh place play-off
5	Chile	4	0	0	4	5	21	−16	0	Ninth place play-off

Source: CONMEBOL
22 November 2017
15:00

Chile	2–3	Ecuador
Mardones 9', 35'	Report	Riera 27', 28'; Caicedo 30'

Polideportivo de Las Piedras, Las Piedras
22 November 2017
19:00

Colombia	3–3	Paraguay
María Munera 8'; Naila Imbachi 14', 37'	Report	Godoy 5'; Paola Brítez 18', 23'

Polideportivo de Las Piedras, Las Piedras

23 November 2017
15:00

Paraguay	3–4	Ecuador
Cortaza 9'; María Barrios 19'; Paola Brítez 36'	Report	Rodríguez 16'; Yasaira Vizuete 18'; Riera 27'; Barré 37'

Polideportivo de Las Piedras, Las Piedras
23 November 2017
19:00

Colombia	0–5	Brazil
	Report	Emily 1', 12'; Vanessa 11', ?'; Amandinha ?'

Polideportivo de Las Piedras, Las Piedras

24 November 2017
15:00

Brazil	11–0	Ecuador
Tampa 2', 3'; Diana 2'; Debora 8'; Emily 10'; Amandinha 11', 24'; Luana 13', 15'; Vizuete 29' (o.g.); Taty 39'	Report

Polideportivo de Las Piedras, Las Piedras
24 November 2017
19:00

Chile	2–3	Paraguay
? ?'; ? ?'	Report	? ?'; ? ?'; ? ?'

Polideportivo de Las Piedras, Las Piedras

25 November 2017
15:00

Chile	0–11	Brazil
		Amandinha 2'; Tampa 6', 34', 36'; Vanessa 11', 38', 39'; Debora 12'; Lú 16'; Jane 26'; Emily 33'

Polideportivo de Las Piedras, Las Piedras
25 November 2017
19:00

Ecuador	2–8	Colombia
Jhonson 30'; Riera 36'		Caicedo 9' (o.g.); Myriam Alonso 11', 16'; Michelle Alzate 17'; Julieth Camacho 28'; Lorena Bedoya 30', 31'; Angie Valbuena 39'

Polideportivo de Las Piedras, Las Piedras

26 November 2017
15:00

Paraguay	1–8	Brazil
Sol Ecobar 32'	Report	Tampa 5'; Vanessa 11', 21', 25', 39'; Lú 12'; Debora 19', 34'

Polideportivo de Las Piedras, Las Piedras
26 November 2017
19:00

Colombia	4–1	Chile
Lorena Bedoya 1'; Myriam Alonso 11'; Naila Imbachi 25'; Diana Velez 32'	Report	Nicole Fajre 14'

Polideportivo de Las Piedras, Las Piedras

== Knockout stage ==
In the semi-finals and final, extra time and penalty shoot-out are used to decide the winner if necessary.

=== Bracket ===
Semi-finals
28 November
Brazil	7
Argentina	0
28 November
Venezuela	1
Colombia	4

Final
29 November
Brazil	3
Colombia	0
Third place
29 November
Argentina	3
Venezuela	0

Fifth place
27 November
Uruguay	4
Ecuador	5

Seventh place
27 November
Bolivia	1
Paraguay	6

Ninth place
27 November
Peru	4
Chile	3

=== Ninth place play-off ===
27 November 2017
15:00

Peru	4–3	Chile
Herrera 6', 16'; Dorador 28', 31'	Report	Olivares 18'; Quezada 19', 37'

Polideportivo de Las Piedras, Las Piedras

=== Seventh place play-off ===
27 November 2017
17:00

Bolivia	1–6	Paraguay
Paola Cruz 9'	Report	Paola Brítez 1', 27', 37'; Claudia Romero 5'; Jennifer González 16'; Sol Escobar 33'

Polideportivo de Las Piedras, Las Piedras

=== Fifth place play-off ===
27 November 2017
19:00

Uruguay	4–5	Ecuador
Camaño 10', 13'; Birizamberri 23'; Ramírez 29'	Report	Barré 11'; Sánchez 15', 17'; Rodríguez 26', 31'

Polideportivo de Las Piedras, Las Piedras

=== Semi-finals ===
28 November 2017
17:00

Brazil	7–0	Argentina
Debora 5', 24'; Emily 8'; Taty 11', 35'; Lu 13'; Vanessa 31'	Report

Polideportivo de Las Piedras, Las Piedras
28 November 2017
19:00

Venezuela	1–4	Colombia
Lavinia Antequera 3'	Report	Lorena Bedoya 15', 25'; Julieth Camacho 26'; Myriam Alonso 37'

Polideportivo de Las Piedras, Las Piedras

=== Third place play-off ===
29 November 2017
17:00

Argentina	3–0	Venezuela
Carina Núñez 13'; Agostina Chiesa 16'; Eliana Medina 29'	Report

Polideportivo de Las Piedras, Las Piedras

=== Final ===
29 November 2017
19:00

Brazil	3–0	Colombia
Vanessa 10', 36'; Amandinha 34'	Report

Polideportivo de Las Piedras, Las Piedras

== Final ranking ==
Rank	Team
1st place, gold medalist(s)	Brazil
2nd place, silver medalist(s)	Colombia
3rd place, bronze medalist(s)	Argentina
4	Venezuela
5	Ecuador
6	Uruguay
7	Paraguay
8	Bolivia
9	Peru
10	Chile
