= 2022 AMF Futsal Women's World Cup =

2022 IV AMF Futsal Women's World Cup
Mundial AMF Futsal Femenino 2022

Tournament details
- Host country: Mosquera, Colombia
- Dates: 24–30 October 2022
- Teams: 12 (from 4 confederations)
- Venue: 1 (in 1 host city)

Final positions
- Champions: Colombia (2nd title)
- Runners-up: Canada
- Third place: Venezuela
- Fourth place: Catalonia

Tournament statistics
- Matches played: 32
- Goals scored: 246 (7.69 per match)

The 2022 AMF Futsal Women's World Cup, also known as the Mundial AMF Futsal Femenino 2022, was the fourth edition of the AMF Futsal Women's World Cup. The tournament was held in Mosquera, Colombia from 24 to 30 October 2022. Twelve national teams from four confederations participated in the tournament.

== Participating teams ==
Including host nation Colombia, 12 nations participated.

Tournament	Qualified teams	
Host	1	Colombia
South America	8	Paraguay; Bolivia^{1} Chile^{1} Ecuador^{1} Peru^{1} Uruguay; Venezuela
Europe	2	Catalonia; France
North America	1	Canada; ~~United States~~
Oceania	1	Australia
Total	12	

1. Teams that made their debut.

== Group stage ==
The group winners and runners up advanced to the quarter-finals.

=== Group A ===
Team	Pld	W	D	L	GF	GA	GD	Pts
Venezuela	3	3	0	0	29	3	+26	9
Chile	3	1	1	1	18	9	+9	4
Catalonia	3	1	1	1	17	9	+8	4
Bolivia	3	0	0	3	1	44	−43	0

24 October
15:00 UTC-5

Venezuela	18–0	Bolivia

Nuevo Coliseo Municipal de Mosquera, Mosquera
24 October
16:30 UTC-5

Catalonia	3–3	Chile

Nuevo Coliseo Municipal de Mosquera, Mosquera
25 October
15:00 UTC-5

Catalonia	1–6	Venezuela

Nuevo Coliseo Municipal de Mosquera, Mosquera
25 October
16:30 UTC-5

Chile	13–1	Bolivia

Nuevo Coliseo Municipal de Mosquera, Mosquera
26 October
12:00 UTC-5

Catalonia	13–0	Bolivia

Nuevo Coliseo Municipal de Mosquera, Mosquera
26 October
13:30 UTC-5

Venezuela	5–2	Chile

Nuevo Coliseo Municipal de Mosquera, Mosquera

=== Group B ===
Team	Pld	W	D	L	GF	GA	GD	Pts
Colombia	3	3	0	0	28	0	+28	9
Canada	3	1	0	2	7	12	−5	3
Uruguay	3	1	0	2	4	13	−9	3
Australia	3	1	0	2	4	18	−14	3

24 October
18:30 UTC-5

Australia	1–3	Uruguay

Nuevo Coliseo Municipal de Mosquera, Mosquera
24 October
20:00 UTC-5

Colombia	8–0	Canada

Nuevo Coliseo Municipal de Mosquera, Mosquera
25 October
18:30 UTC-5

Canada	5–1	Uruguay

Nuevo Coliseo Municipal de Mosquera, Mosquera
25 October
20:00 UTC-5

Colombia	13–0	Australia

Nuevo Coliseo Municipal de Mosquera, Mosquera
26 October
18:30 UTC-5

Australia	3–2	Canada

Nuevo Coliseo Municipal de Mosquera, Mosquera
26 October
20:00 UTC-5

Colombia	7–0	Uruguay

Nuevo Coliseo Municipal de Mosquera, Mosquera

=== Group C ===
Team	Pld	W	D	L	GF	GA	GD	Pts
Ecuador	3	3	0	0	19	6	+13	9
Paraguay	3	2	0	1	17	4	+13	6
Peru	3	1	0	2	5	21	−16	3
France	3	0	0	3	5	15	−10	0

24 October
12:00 UTC-5

Ecuador	8–2	France

Nuevo Coliseo Municipal de Mosquera, Mosquera
24 October
13:30 UTC-5

Peru	0–11	Paraguay

Nuevo Coliseo Municipal de Mosquera, Mosquera
25 October
12:00 UTC-5

Paraguay	3–4	Ecuador

Nuevo Coliseo Municipal de Mosquera, Mosquera
25 October
13:30 UTC-5

Peru	4–3	France

Nuevo Coliseo Municipal de Mosquera, Mosquera
26 October
15:00 UTC-5

Paraguay	3–0	France

Nuevo Coliseo Municipal de Mosquera, Mosquera
26 October
16:30 UTC-5

Ecuador	7–1	Peru

Nuevo Coliseo Municipal de Mosquera, Mosquera

== Knockout stage ==
=== Classification 9th–12th ===
9th place
October 27
Australia	6
Peru	0
11th place
October 27
France	7
Bolivia	0

=== Classification 1st–8th ===
Quarter-finals
October 28
Venezuela	2
Uruguay	1
October 28
Colombia	9
Paraguay	0
October 28
Ecuador	6
Catalonia	8
October 28
Chile	2
Canada	6

Semi-finals
October 29
Venezuela	0
Colombia	6
October 29
Catalonia	2 (1)
Canada	2 (2)

Final
October 30
Colombia	12
Canada	0
3rd place
October 30
Venezuela	3
Catalonia	0

Semi-finals (5th–8th)
October 29
Uruguay	1
Paraguay	2
October 29
Ecuador	4 (2)
Chile	4 (0)

5th place
October 30
Paraguay	3 (3)
Ecuador	3 (4)
7th place
October 30
Uruguay	2
Chile	1

=== 11th place match ===
27 October

France	7–0	Bolivia

Nuevo Coliseo Municipal de Mosquera, Mosquera

=== 9th place match ===
27 October

Australia	6–0	Peru

Nuevo Coliseo Municipal de Mosquera, Mosquera

=== Quarter-finals ===
28 October

Venezuela	2–1	Uruguay

Nuevo Coliseo Municipal de Mosquera, Mosquera
28 October

Colombia	9–0	Paraguay

Nuevo Coliseo Municipal de Mosquera, Mosquera
28 October

Ecuador	6–8	Catalonia

Nuevo Coliseo Municipal de Mosquera, Mosquera
28 October

Chile	2–6	Canada

Nuevo Coliseo Municipal de Mosquera, Mosquera

=== 5th–8th (Semi-finals) ===
29 October

Uruguay	1–2	Paraguay

Nuevo Coliseo Municipal de Mosquera, Mosquera
29 October

Ecuador	4–4	Chile
Penalties
	2–0

Nuevo Coliseo Municipal de Mosquera, Mosquera

=== Semi-finals ===
29 October

Colombia	6–0	Venezuela

Nuevo Coliseo Municipal de Mosquera, Mosquera
29 October

Catalonia	2–2	Canada
Penalties
	1–2

Nuevo Coliseo Municipal de Mosquera, Mosquera

=== 7th place match ===
30 October

Uruguay	2–1	Chile

Nuevo Coliseo Municipal de Mosquera, Mosquera

=== 5th place match ===
30 October
16:00

Paraguay	3–3	Ecuador
Penalties
	3–4

Nuevo Coliseo Municipal de Mosquera, Mosquera

=== Third place play-off ===
30 October
14:30

Venezuela	3–0	Catalonia

Nuevo Coliseo Municipal de Mosquera, Mosquera

=== Final ===
30 October
17:00

Colombia	12–0	Canada

Nuevo Coliseo Municipal de Mosquera, Mosquera

Winners

Colombia

== Final tournament team rankings ==
Pos.	Team	Pld	W	D	L	Pts	GF	GA	GD
1	Colombia	6	6	0	0	18	55	0	+55
2	Canada	6	2	1	3	7	15	28	−13
3	Venezuela	6	5	0	1	15	34	10	+24
4	Catalonia	6	2	2	2	8	27	20	+7
5th through 8th
5	Ecuador	6	3	2	1	11	32	21	+11
6	Paraguay	6	3	1	2	10	22	17	+5
7	Uruguay	6	2	0	4	6	8	18	−10
8	Chile	6	1	2	3	5	25	21	+4
9th through 12th
9	Australia	4	2	0	2	6	10	18	−8
10	Peru	4	1	0	3	3	5	27	−22
11	France	4	1	0	3	3	12	15	−3
12	Bolivia	4	0	0	4	0	1	51	−50
