= Amparo Chuquival =

Peruvian footballer (born 1992)

Personal information
- Full name: Amparo Chuquival Lizana
- Date of birth: 21 February 1992 (age 34)
- Place of birth: Callao, Peru
- Height: 1.65 m (5 ft 5 in)
- Positions: Left back; midfielder

Team information
- Current team: Sport Girls

Senior career*
Years	Team	Apps	(Gls)
- Sport Girls
- Universitario
- Sport Girls

International career^{‡}
2008	Peru U17	?	(0)
2014–	Peru	1+	(0)
- * Club domestic league appearances and goals ‡ National team caps and goals as of 6 August 2019

Amparo Chuquival Lizana (born 21 February 1992) is a Peruvian footballer who plays as a left back for Sport Girls and the Peru women's national team.

== International career ==
Chuquival represented Peru at the 2008 South American U-17 Women's Championship. At senior level, she was part of the squads at the 2014 Copa América Femenina and the 2019 Pan American Games, but did not play. She appeared in a 0–12 friendly loss to Chile in 2017.
