= Chile women's national futsal team =

Chile
- Shirt badge/Association crest
- Nickname(s): La Roja Femenina Futsal
- Association: Football Federation of Chile
- Confederation: CONMEBOL (South America)
- Head coach: (Argentina) Gianluca Freddi
- FIFA code: CHI
- FIFA ranking: 55 ▲1 (24 September 2026)
- Highest FIFA ranking: 56 (October 2024)
- Lowest FIFA ranking: 57 (May 2024)
Home colours	Away colours

First international
- Chile 2–3 Uruguay (Maracay, Venezuela; 8 October 2011)

Biggest win
- Chile 5–3 Argentina (Canelones, Uruguay; 20 December 2015)

Biggest defeat
- Chile 0–11 Brazil (Las Piedras, Uruguay; 25 November 2017); Brazil 11–0 Chile (Luque, Paraguay; 13 December 2019)

AMF World Cup
- Appearances: 1 (First in 2022)
- Best result: Quarter-finals (2022)

Copa América de Futsal Femenina
- Appearances: 6 (First in 2005)
- Best result: Third place (2015)

The Chile women's national futsal team (Spanish: Selección Chilena Futsal Femenina) represents Chile in international futsal competitions and is administered by the Federación de Fútbol de Chile (FFCh).

== History ==
After missing the first three editions of the Sudamericano de Futsal Femenino, Chile established its women's team ahead of the 2011 tournament held in Maracay, Venezuela, and made their debut during the competition on 8 October 2011, losing 2–3 to Uruguay in the opener. After winning one match against Peru, the team ultimately finished eighth.

In the next edition in 2015, with four-time champions Brazil not participating, Chile made it all the way to the semifinals and secured the bronze medal after defeating Argentina 5–3 in the third place playoff. In the next two editions, the Chileans were outplayed by the other South American teams, finishing last overall in both 2017 and 2019.

In 2022, a team affiliated with the AMF represented Chile at the 2022 AMF Futsal Women's World Cup, where they reached the quarter-finals in their debut appearance. Later that year, the FFCh team participated for the first time in the futsal tournament at the ODESUR Games, where they failed to register a single win and finished last.

At the 2023 edition of the Copa América de Futsal Femenina, Chile finished eighth after winning only one of their five matches—marking their first win in the tournament since 2015.

== Results and fixtures ==
The following is a list of match results in the last 12 months, as well as any future matches that have been scheduled.
Legend

Win Draw Lose Fixture

== Players ==
=== Current squad ===
The following 14 players were selected to La Roja squad at the 2025 Copa América de Futsal Femenina in Sorocaba, Brazil, from 22 to 30 March 2025.

No.	Pos.	Player	Date of birth (age)	Club
	GK	Génesis Gómez	26 July 1999 (age 27)	(Argentine Football Association) Boca Juniors
	GK	Valeria Rojas	1 December 1991 (age 34)	(Football Federation of Chile) Deportes Concepción
	DF	Francisca Puma	10 July 1997 (age 29)	(Football Federation of Chile) Universidad de Chile
	DF	Daniela Panguinao	25 October 1996 (age 29)	(Argentine Football Association) Atlético Independiente
	DF	Nancy Camila Álvarez	5 July 1997 (age 29)	(Football Federation of Chile) Punta Arenas Futsal
	DF	Sara Allendes	13 March 1996 (age 30)	(Football Federation of Chile) Punta Arenas Futsal
	DF	Josefina Paz Gómez	5 March 1998 (age 28)	(Argentine Football Association) Ferro Carril Oeste
	DF	Catalina Toro	15 September 1998 (age 28)	(Argentine Football Association) Gimnasia
	FW	Vilma Ruiz	30 May 1994 (age 32)	(Argentine Football Association) Atlético All Boys
	FW	Emily Muñoz	12 October 2001 (age 25)	(Argentine Football Association) Atlético Independiente
	FW	Gisselle Huerta	20 December 1997 (age 28)	(Argentine Football Association) SECLA
	FW	Rocío Maira	4 January 1996 (age 30)	(Argentine Football Association) Gimnasia
	FW	Muriel Araneda	9 November 1998 (age 27)	(Argentine Football Association) Ferro Carril Oeste
	FW	Daniela Gómez	13 October 2000 (age 26)	(Football Federation of Chile) Punta Arenas Futsal

== Competitive record ==
=== FIFA Futsal Women's World Cup ===
FIFA Futsal Women's World Cup record
Year	Position	Pld	W	D*	L	GF	GA
(Philippines) 2025	Did not qualify						
Total	0/1	—	—	—	—	—	—

*Draws include knockout matches decided on penalty kicks.

=== Copa América de Futsal Femenina ===
Copa América de Futsal Femenina record
Year	Position	Pld	W	D*	L	GF	GA
(Brazil) 2005	Did not enter						
(Ecuador) 2007	Did not enter						
(Brazil) 2009	Did not enter						
(Venezuela) 2011	8th	5	1	0	4	13	21
(Uruguay) 2015	3rd	5	2	0	3	13	16
(Uruguay) 2017	10th	5	0	0	5	8	25
(Paraguay) 2019	10th	5	0	0	5	5	24
(Argentina) 2023	8th	5	1	0	4	5	11
(Brazil) 2025	8th	5	1	0	4	4	12
Total	6/9	30	5	0	25	48	109

*Draws include knockout matches decided on penalty kicks.

=== South American Games ===
Futsal at the South American Games record
Year	Position	Pld	W	D*	L	GF	GA
(Bolivia) 2018	Did not enter						
(Paraguay) 2022	5th	5	0	1	4	2	22
(Argentina) 2026	To be determined						
Total	1/2	5	0	1	4	2	22

== See also ==
- Chile women's national football team
