= Naiara Ferrari =

Uruguayan footballer (born 1998)

Personal information
- Full name: Naiara Florencia Ferrari Gómez
- Date of birth: 24 June 1998 (age 28)
- Place of birth: Montevideo, Uruguay
- Height: 1.67 m (5 ft 5 1/2 in)
- Position: Midfielder

Team information
- Current team: Nacional

Youth career
- 2017: Nacional

Senior career*
| Years | Team | Apps | (Gls) |
| 2014–2015 | Universidad ROU | 16 | (10) |
| 2015– | Nacional | 48 | (14) |

International career^{‡}
| 2018– | Uruguay | 1 | (0) |
- * Club domestic league appearances and goals ‡ National team caps and goals as of 25 May 2025

Naiara Florencia Ferrari Gómez (born 24 June 1998) is a Uruguayan footballer who plays as a midfielder for Club Nacional de Football and the Uruguay women's national team.

== Club career ==
In 2015, Ferrari moved from Universidad ROU to Nacional.

== International career ==
Ferrari capped for Uruguay during the 2018 Copa América Femenina.
