= María Valentín =

Peruvian footballer (born 1995)

Personal information
- Full name: María Genoveva Valentín Ruiz
- Date of birth: 13 October 1995 (age 31)
- Height: 1.55 m (5 ft 1 in)
- Position: Midfielder

Team information
- Current team: Sporting Cristal

Senior career*
Years	Team	Apps	(Gls)
- Sporting Cristal

International career^{‡}
2018–	Peru	4	(0)
- * Club domestic league appearances and goals ‡ National team caps and goals as of 12 April 2018

María Genoveva Valentín Ruiz (born 13 October 1995) is a Peruvian footballer who plays as a midfielder for Sporting Cristal and the Peru women's national team.

== International career ==
Valentín played for Peru at senior level in the 2018 Copa América Femenina.
