= 2019 Copa América Femenina de Futsal =

2019 Copa América de Futsal
CONMEBOL Copa América Femenina de Futsal Paraguay 2019

Tournament details
- Host country: Paraguay
- City: Luque
- Dates: 13–20 December
- Teams: 10 (from 1 confederation)
- Venue: 1 (in 1 host city)

Final positions
- Champions: Brazil (6th title)
- Runners-up: Argentina
- Third place: Colombia
- Fourth place: Paraguay

Tournament statistics
- Matches played: 27
- Goals scored: 147 (5.44 per match)

The 2019 CONMEBOL Copa América Femenina de Futsal was the 7th edition of the Copa América Femenina de Futsal, the international futsal championship under FIFA rules organised by CONMEBOL for the women's national teams of South America. The tournament was held in Luque, near the capital city Asunción, in Paraguay, between 13 and 20 December 2019.

== Teams ==
All ten CONMEBOL member national teams entered the tournament.

Team	Appearance	Previous best top-4 performance
Argentina	7th	Runners-up (2011)
Bolivia	3rd	None
Brazil (holders)	6th	Champions (2005, 2007, 2009, 2011, 2017)
Chile	4th	Third place (2015)
Colombia	6th	Champions (2015)
Ecuador	5th	Runners-up (2005)
Paraguay (hosts)	5th	Third place (2011)
Peru	7th	Fourth place (2009)
Uruguay	7th	Runners-up (2015)
Venezuela	5th	Third place (2007, 2009)

== Venues ==
The matches were played at the Polideportivo del Comité Olímpico Paraguayo in Luque.

== Draw ==
The draw of the tournament was held on 19 November 2019, 18:00 PYST (UTC−3), at the Paraguayan Olympic Committee headquarters at Luque, Paraguay. The ten teams were drawn into two groups of five. The hosts, Paraguay, and the title holders, Brazil, were seeded in Groups A and B respectively, while the other eight teams were divided into four pots based on their results in the 2017 Copa América Femenina de Futsal, and were drawn to the remaining group positions.

Seeded	Pot 1	Pot 2	Pot 3	Pot 4
Paraguay (assigned to A1); Brazil (assigned to B1)	Colombia; Argentina	Venezuela; Ecuador	Uruguay; Bolivia	Peru; Chile

== Squads ==
Each team has to submit a squad of 14 players, including a minimum of two goalkeepers.

== Group stage ==
The top two teams of each group advance to the semi-finals.

Tiebreakers

The ranking of teams in the first stage is determined as follows (Regulations Article 8):

1. Points obtained in all group matches (three points for a win, one for a draw, none for a defeat);
2. Goal difference in all group matches;
3. Number of goals scored in all group matches;
4. Points obtained in the matches played between the teams in question;
5. Goal difference in the matches played between the teams in question;
6. Number of goals scored in the matches played between the teams in question;
7. Fair play points in all group matches (only one deduction could be applied to a player in a single match):
  - Yellow card: −1 points;
  - Indirect red card (second yellow card): −3 points;
  - Direct red card: −4 points;
  - Yellow card and direct red card: −5 points;
8. Drawing of lots.

All times local, PYST (UTC−3).

=== Group A ===
Pos	Team	Pld	W	D	L	GF	GA	GD	Pts	Qualification
1	Paraguay (H)	4	3	1	0	14	5	+9	10	Knockout stage
2	Colombia	4	3	1	0	10	4	+6	10	Knockout stage
3	Bolivia	4	2	0	2	8	10	−2	6	Fifth place play-off
4	Peru	4	1	0	3	7	15	−8	3	Seventh place play-off
5	Venezuela	4	0	0	4	4	9	−5	0	Ninth place play-off

Source: CONMEBOL
Rules for classification: Group stage tiebreakers
(H) Hosts
13 December 2019
18:00

Bolivia	4–2	Peru
	Report

Polideportivo del Comité Olímpico Paraguayo, Luque
13 December 2019
20:00

Paraguay	2–1	Venezuela
	Report

Polideportivo del Comité Olímpico Paraguayo, Luque

14 December 2019
18:00

Venezuela	2–3	Peru
	Report

Polideportivo del Comité Olímpico Paraguayo, Luque
14 December 2019
20:00

Paraguay	1–1	Colombia
	Report

Polideportivo del Comité Olímpico Paraguayo, Luque

15 December 2019
18:00

Bolivia	1–0	Venezuela
	Report

Polideportivo del Comité Olímpico Paraguayo, Luque
15 December 2019
20:00

Peru	0–2	Colombia
	Report

Polideportivo del Comité Olímpico Paraguayo, Luque

16 December 2019
18:00

Bolivia	2–4	Colombia
	Report

Polideportivo del Comité Olímpico Paraguayo, Luque
16 December 2019
20:00

Paraguay	7–2	Peru
	Report

Polideportivo del Comité Olímpico Paraguayo, Luque

17 December 2019
18:00

Colombia	3–1	Venezuela
	Report

Polideportivo del Comité Olímpico Paraguayo, Luque
17 December 2019
20:00

Paraguay	4–1	Bolivia
	Report

Polideportivo del Comité Olímpico Paraguayo, Luque

=== Group B ===
Pos	Team	Pld	W	D	L	GF	GA	GD	Pts	Qualification
1	Brazil	4	4	0	0	37	2	+35	12	Knockout stage
2	Argentina	4	3	0	1	17	6	+11	9	Knockout stage
3	Uruguay	4	1	1	2	4	12	−8	4	Fifth place play-off
4	Ecuador	4	1	1	2	6	26	−20	4	Seventh place play-off
5	Chile	4	0	0	4	4	22	−18	0	Ninth place play-off

Source: CONMEBOL
Rules for classification: Group stage tiebreakers
13 December 2019
14:00

Ecuador	0–9	Argentina
	Report

Polideportivo del Comité Olímpico Paraguayo, Luque
13 December 2019
16:00

Brazil	11–0	Chile
	Report

Polideportivo del Comité Olímpico Paraguayo, Luque

14 December 2019
14:00

Chile	0–4	Argentina
	Report

Polideportivo del Comité Olímpico Paraguayo, Luque
14 December 2019
16:00

Brazil	8–0	Uruguay
	Report

Polideportivo del Comité Olímpico Paraguayo, Luque

15 December 2019
14:00

Ecuador	5–3	Chile
	Report

Polideportivo del Comité Olímpico Paraguayo, Luque
15 December 2019
16:00

Uruguay	1–2	Argentina
	Report

Polideportivo del Comité Olímpico Paraguayo, Luque

16 December 2019
14:00

Ecuador	1–1	Uruguay
	Report

Polideportivo del Comité Olímpico Paraguayo, Luque
16 December 2019
16:00

Brazil	5–2	Argentina
	Report

Polideportivo del Comité Olímpico Paraguayo, Luque

17 December 2019
14:00

Uruguay	2–1	Chile
	Report

Polideportivo del Comité Olímpico Paraguayo, Luque
17 December 2019
16:00

Brazil	13–0	Ecuador
	Report

Polideportivo del Comité Olímpico Paraguayo, Luque

== Knockout stage ==
In the knockout stage, extra time and penalty shoot-out would be used to decide the winner if necessary (no extra time would be used in the play-offs for third to tenth place).

=== Bracket ===
Semi-finals
19 December
Brazil	6
Colombia	1
19 December
Paraguay	2
Argentina	4

Final
20 December
Brazil	4
Argentina	1
Third place play-off
20 December
Colombia	2
Paraguay	1

Fifth place play-off
20 December
Bolivia	1
Uruguay	4

Seventh place play-off
20 December
Peru	2
Ecuador	5

Ninth place play-off
19 December
Venezuela	2
Chile	1

=== Ninth place play-off ===
19 December 2019
16:00

Venezuela	2–1	Chile
	Report

Polideportivo del Comité Olímpico Paraguayo, Luque

=== Semi-finals ===
19 December 2019
18:00

Brazil	6–1	Colombia
	Report

Polideportivo del Comité Olímpico Paraguayo, Luque

19 December 2019
20:00

Paraguay	2–4	Argentina
	Report

Polideportivo del Comité Olímpico Paraguayo, Luque

=== Seventh place play-off ===
20 December 2019
14:00

Peru	2–5	Ecuador
	Report

Polideportivo del Comité Olímpico Paraguayo, Luque

=== Fifth place play-off ===
20 December 2019
16:00

Bolivia	1–4	Uruguay
	Report

Polideportivo del Comité Olímpico Paraguayo, Luque

=== Third place play-off ===
20 December 2019
18:00

Colombia	2–1	Paraguay
	Report

Polideportivo del Comité Olímpico Paraguayo, Luque

=== Final ===
20 December 2019
20:00

Brazil	4–1	Argentina
	Report

Polideportivo del Comité Olímpico Paraguayo, Luque

== Final ranking ==
Rank	Team
1st place, gold medalist(s)	Brazil
2nd place, silver medalist(s)	Argentina
3rd place, bronze medalist(s)	Colombia
4	Paraguay
5	Uruguay
6	Bolivia
7	Ecuador
8	Peru
9	Venezuela
10	Chile
