= Stefany Suárez =

Uruguayan footballer (born 1994)

Personal information
- Full name: Stefany Micaela Suárez Silva
- Date of birth: 13 August 1994 (age 32)
- Place of birth: Montevideo, Uruguay
- Height: 1.54 m (5 ft 1/2 in)
- Position: Midfielder

Team information
- Current team: Peñarol
- Number: 7

Senior career*
Years	Team	Apps	(Gls)
2014–2015	Bella Vista	17	(6)
2015–2016	Colón	21	(11)
2017–	Peñarol	49	(26)

International career^{‡}
2018–	Uruguay	4	(0)
- * Club domestic league appearances and goals ‡ National team caps and goals as of 25 May 2025

Stefany Micaela Suárez Silva (born 13 August 1994) is a Uruguayan footballer who plays as a midfielder for CA Peñarol and the Uruguay women's national team.
