= Futsal at the 2022 South American Games =

Futsal competitions at the 2022 South American Games

- Venue: Estadio León Condou
- Dates: October 10−14
- Nations: 8

Futsal competitions at the 2022 South American Games in Asunción, Paraguay were held between October 10 and 14, 2022 at the Estadio León Condou.

== Schedule ==
The competition schedule is as follows:

G	Group stage

Date Event	Mon 10	Tue 11	Wed 12	Thu 13	Fri 14
Men's futsal	G	G	G	G	G
Women's futsal	G	G	G	G	G

== Medal summary ==
=== Medal table ===
* Host nation (Paraguay)

Rank	Nation	Gold	Silver	Bronze	Total
1	Argentina (ARG)	1	1	0	2
1	Paraguay (PAR)*	1	1	0	2
3	Bolivia (BOL)	0	0	1	1
3	Colombia (COL)	0	0	1	1
Totals (4 entries)		2	2	2	6

=== Medalists ===
Event	Gold	Silver	Bronze
Men's tournament	Argentina; Augusto Van De Casteele; Brian Steccato; Dylan Vargas; Ezequiel Ramírez; Juan Pablo Cuello; Kevin Arrieta; Lucas Flores; Luka Benyik; Martín Dorda; Matías Edelstein; Nicolás Tumkiewicz; Nicolás Rosa; Nicolás Lachaga; Tomás Bazan	Paraguay; Alan Rojas; Antonio Ozuna; Arnaldo Báez; Francisco Martínez; Giovanni González; Hugo Martínez; Igor Insfrán; Iván González; Javier Salas; Jorge Espinoza; Julio Mareco; Pedro Pascottini; Richard Rejala; Wilson Veiga	Colombia; Andrés Matos; Andrés Villa; Angellott Caro; Arnoby Botero; Camilo Gómez; Eder Burgos; Felipe Echavarría; Jorge Cuervo; Jorge Abril; José Sánchez; Julián Pardo; Nicolás Vásquez; Sebastián Sánchez; Yulián Díaz
Women's tournament	Paraguay; Andrea Lorena Brítez; Andrea Paola Brítez; Cinthia Arévalo; Claudia Romero; Diana Gómez; Jessica Franco; Liz Sosa; Natasha Martínez; Perla Bareiro; Sara Silva; Sol Escobar; Verónica Vallejos; Yessica Armoa; Zaira Ferreira	Argentina; Alejandra Gayoso; Ana Ontiveros; Evangelina Testa; Julia Paz; Lucía Rossi; Luciana Lera; Mailen Romero; María Victoria Velez; Melina Quevedo; Paula Chiesa; Silvina Nava; Silvina Espinazo; Sofía Florentín; Tamara Ubeda	Bolivia; Aidé Mendiola; Ana María Rivera; Dayana Jiménez; Elizabeth Limachi; Ingrid Siles; Ivonne Nina; Karla Ticona; Martha Chura; Michelle Pacheco; Patricia Fuentes; Ruth Copa; Wendy Baltazar

== Participation ==
Eight nations participated in futsal events of the 2022 South American Games.

- Argentina
- Bolivia
- Chile
- Colombia
- Panama
- Paraguay
- Uruguay
- Venezuela

== Results ==
=== Men's tournament ===
Pos	Team	Pld	W	D	L	PF	PA	PD	Pts	Result	ARG	PAR	COL	BOL	PAN	VEN
1	Argentina	5	4	1	0	14	3	+11	13	1st place, gold medalist(s)	—	2–1	4–1	3–0	4–0	1–1
2	Paraguay	5	4	0	1	15	6	+9	12	2nd place, silver medalist(s)	1–2	—	2–1	5–0	4–2	3–1
3	Colombia	5	2	1	2	9	9	0	7	3rd place, bronze medalist(s)	1–4	1–2	—	3–0	2–1	2–2
4	Bolivia	5	2	0	3	6	13	−7	6		0–3	0–5	0–3	—	4–1	2–1
5	Panama	6	1	1	4	5	14	−9	4		0–4	2–4	1–2	1–4	—	1–0
6	Venezuela	5	0	2	3	5	9	−4	2		1–1	1–3	2–2	1–2	0–1	—

=== Women's tournament ===
Pos	Team	Pld	W	D	L	PF	PA	PD	Pts	Result	PAR	ARG	BOL	URU	VEN	CHI
1	Paraguay	5	5	0	0	11	1	+10	15	1st place, gold medalist(s)	—	1–0	1–0	2–1	2–0	5–0
2	Argentina	5	3	1	1	15	4	+11	10	2nd place, silver medalist(s)	0–1	—	3–0	2–2	4–1	6–0
3	Bolivia	5	2	1	2	11	9	+2	7	3rd place, bronze medalist(s)	0–1	0–3	—	4–4	2–1	5–0
4	Uruguay	5	1	3	1	11	11	0	6		1–2	2–2	4–4	—	3–2	1–1
5	Venezuela	5	1	0	4	9	12	−3	3		0–2	1–4	1–2	2–3	—	5–1
6	Chile	5	0	1	4	2	22	−20	1		0–5	0–6	0–5	1–1	1–5	—
