= Federica Silvera =

Uruguayan footballer and futsal player (born 1993)

Personal information
- Full name: Federica Silvera Arias
- Date of birth: 13 February 1993 (age 33)
- Place of birth: Montevideo, Uruguay
- Height: 1.63 m (5 ft 4 in)
- Positions: Forward; midfielder

Team information
- Current team: San Lorenzo

Youth career
- 2005: Colón (baby fútbol)

Senior career*
Years	Team	Apps	(Gls)
2006–2009	Fénix		
2010–2017	Nacional		
2017–	San Lorenzo		

International career^{‡}
2014–	Uruguay	3	(0)
- * Club domestic league appearances and goals ‡ National team caps and goals as of 14 May 2025

Federica Silvera Arias (born 13 February 1993) is a Uruguayan footballer and futsal player who plays as a forward for Argentine club San Lorenzo de Almagro and the Uruguay women's national team.

== International career ==
Silvera capped for Uruguay during the 2014 Copa América Femenina.

== Personal life ==
Silvera is a supporter of Nacional.
