= Copa América de Futsal Femenina =

- Organiser(s): CONMEBOL
- Founded: 2005; 21 years ago
- Region: South America
- Teams: 10
- Qualifier for: FIFA Futsal Women's World Cup
- Current champions: Brazil (8th title)
- Most championships: Brazil (8 titles)
- Website: conmebol.com/Copa_América_Futsal_Femenina
- 2025 Copa América de Futsal Femenina

The Copa América de Futsal Femenina, officially known as the CONMEBOL Copa América Futsal Femenina, is the premier women's national futsal tournament for member nations of CONMEBOL. The competition was first held in 2005 under the name Sudamericano Femenino de Futsal, a title it retained through the 2011 edition. Beginning in 2025, the tournament also serves as the CONMEBOL qualifying tournament for the FIFA Futsal Women's World Cup.

== Results ==
#	Year	Host	Final			Third Place Match			Teams
#	Year	Host	Champion	Score	Second Place	Third Place	Score	Fourth Place	Teams
1	2005; Details	Barueri; Brazil	Brazil	13–0	Ecuador	Argentina	1–0	Uruguay	6
2	2007; Details	Guayaquil; Ecuador	Brazil	6–2	Colombia	Venezuela	4–2	Uruguay	7
3	2009; Details	Campinas; Brazil	Brazil	7–1	Colombia	Venezuela	6–2	Peru	7
4	2011; Details	Maracay; Venezuela	Brazil	8–1	Argentina	Paraguay	4–2	Venezuela	9
5	2015; Details	Montevideo; Uruguay	Colombia	4–2	Uruguay	Chile	5–3	Argentina	6
6	2017; Details	Las Piedras; Uruguay	Brazil	3–0	Colombia	Argentina	3–0	Venezuela	10
7	2019; Details	Asunción; Paraguay	Brazil	4–1	Argentina	Colombia	2–1	Paraguay	10
8	2023; Details	Buenos Aires; Argentina	Brazil	2–0	Argentina	Colombia	0–0 (7–6 p)	Venezuela	10
9	2025; Details	Sorocaba; Brazil	Brazil	3–0	Argentina	Colombia	4–1	Paraguay	10

== Medals (2005-2025) ==
Rank	Nation	Gold	Silver	Bronze	Total
1	Brazil	8	0	0	8
2	Colombia	1	3	3	7
3	Argentina	0	4	2	6
4	Ecuador	0	1	0	1
4	Uruguay	0	1	0	1
6	Venezuela	0	0	2	2
7	Chile	0	0	1	1
7	Paraguay	0	0	1	1
Totals (8 entries)		9	9	9	27

== Summary (2005-2025) ==
Rank	Team	Part	M	W	D	L	GF	GA	GD	Points
1	Brazil	8	41	41	0	0	316	19	+297	123
2	Colombia	8	41	25	5	11	147	97	+50	80
3	Argentina	9	43	26	2	15	131	89	+42	80
4	Uruguay	9	43	17	3	23	98	123	-25	54
5	Venezuela	7	37	17	1	19	82	98	-16	52
6	Paraguay	6	30	14	4	12	87	98	-21	46
7	Ecuador	7	32	15	1	16	94	160	-66	46
8	Bolivia	5	24	6	2	16	39	99	-60	20
9	Peru	9	39	5	2	32	63	155	-135	17
10	Chile	6	30	5	0	25	48	109	-61	15
