= Argentina women's national futsal team =

Argentina
- Shirt badge/Association crest
- Nickname(s): La Albiceleste; La Celeste y Blanca
- Association: Argentine Football Association
- Confederation: CONMEBOL (South America)
- Head coach: Nicolás Noriega
- FIFA code: ARG
- FIFA ranking: 4 (8 May 2026)
Home colours	Away colours

First international
- Argentina 4–2 Venezuela (Santiago, Chile; 21 February 2001)

Biggest win
- Argentina 8–0 Peru (Las Piedras, Uruguay; 22 November 2017)

Biggest defeat
- Argentina 0–14 Brazil (Santiago, Chile; 23 February 2001)

FIFA World Cup
- Appearances: 1 (First in 2011)
- Best result: Group Stage (2011)

FIFA Futsal Women's World Cup
- Appearances: 1 (First in 2025)
- Best result: Fourth place (2025)

AMF World Cup
- Appearances: 3 (First in 2008)
- Best result: Runners-up (2017)

South American Championship
- Appearances: 8 (First in 2005)
- Best result: Runners-up (2011, 2019, 2023)

Argentina women's national futsal team represents Argentina in international futsal competitions and is controlled by the Argentine Football Association (Asociación del Fútbol Argentino).

== Fixtures and results ==
The following is a list of match results in the last 12 months, as well as any future matches that have been scheduled.

Win Draw Lose Fixture

=== 2025 ===
21 November 2025 FIFA Futsal Women's World Cup	Morocco	0–6	Argentina	PhilSports Arena, Pasig
18:00		Report	Ontiveros 14'56"; Chiesa 15'36"; Romero 16'47"; Natta 17'30"; Villalba 20'39"; Dupuy 28'48"	Attendance: 1,378; Referee: Martina Piccolo (Italy)

24 November 2025 FIFA Futsal Women's World Cup	Argentina	3–2	Poland	PhilSports Arena, Pasig
18:00	Nava 8'04"; Chiesa 10'32"; Rossi 14'02"	Report	Bała 21'48"; Chóras 38'24"	Attendance: 955; Referee: Liang Qingyun (China)

27 November 2025 FIFA Futsal Women's World Cup	Argentina	5-1	Philippines	Pasig, Philippines
20:30 UTC+8		Report		Stadium: PhilSports Arena

== Tournament records ==
Champions Runners up Third place Fourth place

=== FIFA ===
==== FIFA Futsal Women's World Cup ====
FIFA Futsal Women's World Cup record
Year	Round	Position	Pld	W	D*	L	GF	GA
(Philippines) 2025	Fourth place	4th	6	4	0	2	20	16
Total:1/1	Fourth place	4th	6	4	0	2	20	16

*Draws include knockout matches decided on penalty kicks.

=== AMF ===
==== Futsal Women's World Cup ====
AMF Futsal World Cup record
Year	Round	Position	Pld	W	D*	L	GF	GA
(Catalonia) 2008	Quarterfinals	5th	5	4	0	1	24	12
(Colombia) 2013	Semifinals	4th	6	2	1	3	17	18
(Catalonia) 2017	Final	2nd	5	4	0	1	27	9
(Colombia) 2022	Did not enter							
Total	Runners-up	3/4	16	10	1	5	68	39

==== Futsal World Tournament ====
World Tournament record
Year	Round	Position	Pld	W	D*	L	GF	GA
(Spain) 2010	Did not participate							
(Brazil) 2011	Play-off round	6th	5	1	1	3	12	14
(Portugal) 2012	Did not participate							
(Spain) 2013	Did not participate							
(Costa Rica) 2014	Did not participate							
(Guatemala) 2015	Did not participate							
Total	6th place	1/6	5	1	1	3	12	14

=== CONMEBOL ===
==== Copa América Femenina de Futsal ====
Copa América Femenina record
Year	Round	Position	Pld	W	D*	L	GF	GA
(Brazil) 2005	Semifinals	3rd	4	1	1	2	4	12
(Ecuador) 2007	Group Stage	6th	2	0	0	2	3	8
(Brazil) 2009	Group Stage	6th	2	0	0	2	2	13
(Venezuela) 2011	Final	2nd	6	5	0	1	18	11
(Uruguay) 2015	Semifinals	4th	5	3	0	2	16	11
(Uruguay) 2017	Semifinals	3rd	6	4	0	2	22	12
(Paraguay) 2019	Final	2nd	6	4	0	2	22	12
(Argentina) 2023	Final	2nd	6	5	0	1	23	3
Total	Runners-up	8/8	37	22	1	14	110	82

=== South American Games ===
South American Games record
Year	Round	Position	Pld	W	D*	L	GF	GA
(Bolivia) 2018	Round-robin	4th	4	1	1	2	10	9
(Paraguay) 2022	Round-robin	2nd	5	3	1	1	15	4
Total	Runners-up	2/2	9	4	2	3	25	13

== See also ==
- Argentina national futsal team (men's national team)
