= 2014 Moroccan census =

Census of Morocco's population by the Moroccan government

2014 census of Morocco
- 2014

General information
- Country: Morocco
- Authority: High Commission for Planning
- Website: www.hcp.ma/Recensement-population-RGPH-2014_a2941.html

Results
- Total population: 33,848,242 (▲13.24%)

The 2014 Moroccan census was held in Morocco from 1 to 20 September 2014. The census was conducted by the High Planning Commission. The previous census was held in 2004.

== Modern techniques for statistics ==
This major national operation mobilized the various technological, organizational and communication means available during the various stages of its implementation, and this census was matched methodically, in terms of content and linearly with the standards adopted in this regard by the United Nations, which has given it a distinguished position compared to the rest of the previous national statistics in terms of its comprehensiveness to the population. Similar to the previous statistics, where modern techniques and methods are included, whether it comes to the stages of preparation or exploitation and dissemination of data, the same is true for the 2014 census, which has a special character due to its reliance on many developments, represented in particular in: −The use of satellite images in cartographic works. –A new approach to recruiting researchers and observers (submission of nominations via the Internet). –Introducing new topics in the areas of demography, housing and disability.

== Results ==
POPULATION LEGALE DES REGIONS, PROVINCES, PREFECTURES, MUNICIPALITES, ARRONDISSEMENTS ET COMMUNES DU ROYAUME
D'APRES LES RESULTATS DU RECENSEMENT GENERAL DE LA POPULATION ET DE L'HABITAT DE 2014
الرمز الجغرافي	Région, Province, Préfecture, Municipalité (Mun.), Arrondisement (Arrond.) ou Commune	الأسر	السكان	الأجانب	المغاربة	الجهة، الإقليم، العمالة، البلدية، المقاطعة أو الجماعة
Code Géographique		Ménages	Population	Etrangers	Marocains	
01.	Tanger-Tetouan-Al Hoceima	799,124	3,556,729	7,453	3,549,276	طنجة - تطوان - الحسيمة
01.051.	Province: Al Hoceima	79,326	399,654	236	399,418	إقليم: الحسيمة
01.051.01.01.	Al Hoceima (Mun.)	13,881	56,716	50	56,666	الحسيمة (البلدية)
01.051.01.03.	Bni Bouayach (Mun.)	4,062	18,271	9	18,262	بني بوعياش (البلدية)
01.051.01.05.	Imzouren (Mun.)	7,440	33,852	8	33,844	امزورن (البلدية)
01.051.01.07.	Targuist (Mun.)	2,969	13,390	25	13,365	تارجيست (البلدية)
01.051.01.09.	Ajdir (Mun.)	1,292	5,314	13	5,301	أجدير (البلدية)
01.051.03.	Cercle : Bni Boufrah	6,529	37,935	0	37,935	دائرة : بني بوفراح
01.051.03.01.	Bni Boufrah	1,875	9,653	0	9,653	بني بوفراح
01.051.03.03.	Bni Gmil	1,444	9,513	0	9,513	بني جميل
01.051.03.05.	Bni Gmil Maksouline	1,477	9,593	0	9,593	بني جميل مكسولين
01.051.03.07.	Senada	1,733	9,176	0	9,176	سنادة
01.051.05.	Cercle : Bni Ouriaghel	17,469	85,956	12	85,944	دائرة : بني أورياغل
01.051.05.01.	Ait Kamra	1,642	7,685	8	7,677	أيت قمرة
01.051.05.03.	Ait Youssef Ou Ali	2,598	12,673	1	12,672	أيت يوسف وعلي
01.051.05.03.4.	Dont Centre: Sidi Bouafif	733	3,350	1	3,349	مركز: سيدي بوعفيف
01.051.05.05.	Arbaa Taourirt	985	5,187	0	5,187	اربعاء تاوريرت
01.051.05.07.	Bni Abdallah	1,229	5,983	0	5,983	بني عبد الله
01.051.05.09.	Bni Hadifa	1,193	5,594	0	5,594	بني حذيفة
01.051.05.09.3.	Dont Centre: Bni Hadifa	516	2,171	0	2,171	مركز: بني حذيفة
01.051.05.11.	Chakrane	819	4,761	0	4,761	شكران
01.051.05.13.	Imrabten	1,782	8,715	1	8,714	امرابطن
01.051.05.13.3.	Dont Centre: Tamassint	407	1,831	1	1,830	مركز: تمسينت
01.051.05.15.	Izemmouren	1,213	5,153	1	5,152	ازمورن
01.051.05.17.	Louta	886	4,428	0	4,428	لوطا
01.051.05.19.	Nekkour	1,780	8,963	0	8,963	نقور
01.051.05.21.	Rouadi	1,572	7,131	1	7,130	رواضي
01.051.05.23.	Tifarouine	840	4,231	0	4,231	تيفروين
01.051.05.25.	Zaouiat Sidi Abdelkader	930	5,452	0	5,452	زاوية سيدي عبد القادر
01.051.07.	Cercle : Targuist	8,618	50,317	2	50,315	دائرة : تارجيست
01.051.07.03.	Bni Ahmed Imoukzan	1,519	9,086	0	9,086	بني أحمد اموكزان
01.051.07.05.	Bni Ammart	1,219	6,654	1	6,653	بني عمارت
01.051.07.07.	Bni Bchir	1,017	6,527	1	6,526	بني بشير
01.051.07.11.	Bni Bounsar	1,242	7,660	0	7,660	بني بونصر
01.051.07.19.	Sidi Boutmim	1,831	9,988	0	9,988	سيدي بوتميم
01.051.07.21.	Sidi Bouzineb	630	3,711	0	3,711	سيدي بوزينب
01.051.07.27.	Zarkt	1,160	6,691	0	6,691	زرقات
01.051.09.	Cercle : Ketama	17,066	97,903	117	97,786	دائرة : كتامة
01.051.09.01.	Abdelghaya Souahel	4,140	25,817	2	25,815	عبد الغاية السواحل
01.051.09.09.	Bni Bouchibet	1,530	9,032	0	9,032	بني بوشبت
01.051.09.13.	Issaguen	3,267	17,095	109	16,986	اساكن
01.051.09.13.3.	Dont Centre: Issaguen	710	2,474	94	2,380	مركز: اساكن
01.051.09.15.	Ketama	3,255	17,351	0	17,351	كتامة
01.051.09.17.	Moulay Ahmed Cherif	1,585	9,765	0	9,765	مولاي أحمد الشريف
01.051.09.23.	Taghzout	966	5,132	6	5,126	تاغزوت
01.051.09.25.	Tamsaout	2,323	13,711	0	13,711	تامساوت
01.151.	Province: Chefchaouen	82,914	457,432	143	457,289	إقليم: شفشاون
01.151.01.01.	Chefchaouen (Mun.)	10,295	42,786	92	42,694	شفشاون (البلدية)
01.151.03.	Cercle : Bab Berred	13,588	77,641	3	77,638	دائرة : باب برد
01.151.03.03.	Bab Berred	4,932	25,872	1	25,871	باب برد
01.151.03.03.3.	Dont Centre: Bab Berred	1,176	4,977	1	4,976	مركز: باب برد
01.151.03.13.	Iounane	4,004	25,021	0	25,021	أيونان
01.151.03.23.	Tamorot	4,652	26,748	2	26,746	تمروت
01.151.05.	Cercle : Bab Taza	18,680	101,406	7	101,399	دائرة : باب تازة
01.151.05.01.	Bab Taza	5,259	28,713	3	28,710	باب تازة
01.151.05.01.3.	Dont Centre: Bab Taza	1,315	5,905	3	5,902	مركز: باب تازة
01.151.05.03.	Bni Darkoul	2,657	14,779	1	14,778	بني دركول
01.151.05.05.	Bni Faghloum	2,046	10,378	1	10,377	بني فغلوم
01.151.05.07.	Bni Salah	1,851	11,365	0	11,365	بني صالح
01.151.05.09.	Derdara	2,107	11,547	0	11,547	الدردارة
01.151.05.11.	Fifi	1,626	8,104	2	8,102	فيفي
01.151.05.13.	Laghdir	1,467	7,284	0	7,284	لغدير
01.151.05.15.	Tanaqoub	1,667	9,236	0	9,236	تانقوب
01.151.06.	Cercle : Bni Ahmed	10,754	55,303	1	55,302	دائرة : بني أحمد
01.151.06.05.	Bni Ahmed Cherqia	2,750	12,866	0	12,866	بني أحمد الشرقية
01.151.06.07.	Bni Ahmed Gharbia	2,634	12,978	0	12,978	بني أحمد الغربية
01.151.06.15.	Mansoura	2,829	15,820	0	15,820	المنصورة
01.151.06.21.	Oued Malha	2,541	13,639	1	13,638	واد ملحة
01.151.07.	Cercle : Bou Ahmed	16,694	102,247	30	102,217	دائرة : بو أحمد
01.151.07.01.	Bni Bouzra	2,815	16,568	3	16,565	بني بوزرة
01.151.07.03.	Bni Mansour	3,085	20,811	0	20,811	بني منصور
01.151.07.05.	Bni Selmane	3,605	24,217	5	24,212	بني سلمان
01.151.07.07.	Steha	2,164	12,034	3	12,031	اسطيحة
01.151.07.09.	Talambote	1,399	8,481	4	8,477	تلمبوط
01.151.07.11.	Tassift	1,213	7,363	1	7,362	تاسيفت
01.151.07.13.	Tizgane	2,413	12,773	14	12,759	تزكان
01.151.09.	Cercle : Jebha	12,903	78,049	10	78,039	دائرة : جبهة
01.151.09.01.	Amtar	1,766	10,574	2	10,572	امتار
01.151.09.09.	Bni Rzine	3,333	20,904	5	20,899	بني رزين
01.151.09.11.	Bni Smih	2,682	16,987	1	16,986	بني سميح
01.151.09.17.	M'tioua	2,291	12,812	0	12,812	متيوة
01.151.09.17.3.	Dont Centre: Jebha	910	3,757	0	3,757	مركز: الجبهة
01.151.09.19.	Ouaouzgane	2,831	16,772	2	16,770	ووزكان
01.227.	Province: Fahs-Anjra	16,823	76,447	44	76,403	إقليم: فحص - انجرة
01.227.03.	Cercle : Anjra	9,020	42,735	24	42,711	دائرة : أنجرة
01.227.03.05.	Anjra	3,208	16,081	1	16,080	أنجرة
01.227.03.11.	Jouamaa	1,595	7,711	2	7,709	اجوامعة
01.227.03.13.	Ksar El Majaz	2,286	10,237	6	10,231	القصر المجاز
01.227.03.21.	Taghramt	1,931	8,706	15	8,691	تغرامت
01.227.05.	Cercle : Fahs	7,803	33,712	20	33,692	دائرة : فحص
01.227.05.01.	Al Bahraoyine	2,030	8,465	9	8,456	البحراويين
01.227.05.05.	Ksar Sghir	3,015	12,997	11	12,986	القصر الصغير
01.227.05.09.	Malloussa	2,758	12,250	0	12,250	ملوسة
01.331.	Province: Larache	107,357	496,687	413	496,274	إقليم: العرائش
01.331.01.01.	Ksar El Kebir (Mun.)	29,514	126,617	114	126,503	القصر الكبير (البلدية)
01.331.01.03.	Larache (Mun.)	30,400	125,008	199	124,809	العرائش (البلدية)
01.331.07.	Cercle : Loukouss	21,865	115,794	0	115,794	دائرة : اللوكوس
01.331.07.01.	Bou Jedyane	2,526	11,166	0	11,166	بوجديان
01.331.07.03.	Ksar Bjir	3,270	16,308	0	16,308	قصر بجير
01.331.07.05.	Laouamra	6,901	40,605	0	40,605	العوامرة
01.331.07.05.3.	Dont Centre: Laouamra	1,507	7,793	0	7,793	مركز: العوامرة
01.331.07.11.	Souk L'Qolla	2,911	14,965	0	14,965	سوق القلة
01.331.07.15.	Tatoft	2,241	9,527	0	9,527	تطفت
01.331.07.17.	Zouada	4,016	23,223	0	23,223	زوادة
01.331.09.	Cercle : Moulay Abdeslem-Ben M'chich	9,583	44,633	1	44,632	دائرة : مولاي عبد السلام بن مشيش
01.331.09.01.	Ayacha	1,573	7,335	0	7,335	عياشة
01.331.09.03.	Bni Arouss	1,879	8,193	1	8,192	بني عروس
01.331.09.05.	Bni Garfett	2,738	12,994	0	12,994	بني كرفط
01.331.09.13.	Tazroute	1,262	5,974	0	5,974	تازروت
01.331.09.15.	Zaaroura	2,131	10,137	0	10,137	زعرورة
01.331.11.	Cercle : Oued El Makhazine	15,995	84,635	99	84,536	دائرة : وادي المخازين
01.331.11.03.	Oulad Ouchih	2,150	12,608	0	12,608	أولاد أوشيح
01.331.11.07.	Rissana Chamalia	2,481	12,484	3	12,481	ريصانة الشمالية
01.331.11.09.	Rissana Janoubia	2,924	16,366	0	16,366	ريصانة الجنوبية
01.331.11.11.	Sahel	3,795	17,496	94	17,402	الساحل
01.331.11.11.3.	Dont Centre: Khemis Sahel	1,371	6,242	1	6,241	مركز: خميس الساحل
01.331.11.12.	Souaken	2,196	12,632	0	12,632	السواكن
01.331.11.13.	Souk Tolba	2,449	13,049	2	13,047	سوق الطلبة
01.405.	Province: Ouezzane	67,858	300,637	134	300,503	إقليم: وزان
01.405.01.09.	Ouezzane (Mun.)	14,835	59,606	106	59,500	وزان (البلدية)
01.405.07.	Cercle : Ouezzane	30,396	138,146	17	138,129	دائرة : وزان
01.405.07.01.	Bni Quolla	3,582	16,049	2	16,047	بني قلة
01.405.07.03.	Lamjaara	3,782	18,820	10	18,810	لمجاعرة
01.405.07.03.3.	Dont Centre: Ain Dorij	813	3,394	10	3,384	مركز: عين الدريج
01.405.07.05.	Masmouda	3,650	16,106	1	16,105	مصمودة
01.405.07.07.	Mzefroune	1,659	6,973	0	6,973	امزفرون
01.405.07.09.	Ounnana	2,603	12,801	1	12,800	أونانة
01.405.07.11.	Sidi Ahmed Cherif	2,037	9,576	1	9,575	سيدي أحمد الشريف
01.405.07.13.	Sidi Bousber	2,416	10,528	0	10,528	سيدي بوصبر
01.405.07.15.	Sidi Redouane	4,624	19,169	0	19,169	سيدي رضوان
01.405.07.17.	Teroual	2,807	12,621	1	12,620	تروال
01.405.07.19.	Zghira	3,236	15,503	1	15,502	ازغيرة
01.405.09.	Cercle : Moqrisset	10,182	46,061	3	46,058	دائرة : مقريصات
01.405.09.01.	Ain Beida	2,521	11,978	0	11,978	عين بيضاء
01.405.09.03.	Asjen	2,865	13,139	0	13,139	اسجن
01.405.09.05.	Brikcha	2,438	10,399	1	10,398	ابريكشة
01.405.09.05.3.	Dont Centre: Brikcha	358	1,167	1	1,166	مركز: ابريكشة
01.405.09.09.	Moqrisset	2,358	10,545	2	10,543	مقريصات
01.405.09.09.3.	Dont Centre: Moqrisset	414	1,634	2	1,632	مركز: مقريصات
01.405.11.	Cercle : Zoumi	12,445	56,824	8	56,816	دائرة : زومي
01.405.11.07.	Kalaat Bouqorra	3,371	16,163	0	16,163	قلعة بوقرة
01.405.11.11.	Zoumi	9,074	40,661	8	40,653	زومي
01.405.11.11.3.	Dont Centre: Zoumi	1,131	4,438	7	4,431	مركز: زومي
01.511.	Préfecture: Tanger-Assilah	266,738	1,065,601	5,299	1,060,302	عمالة: طنجة - أصيلا
01.511.01.01.	Assilah (Mun.)	7,947	31,147	93	31,054	اصيلة (البلدية)
01.511.01.03.	Bni Makada (Arrond.)	91,737	386,191	441	385,750	بني مكادة (المقاطعة)
01.511.01.05.	Charf-Mghogha (Arrond.)	50,619	201,122	610	200,512	الشرف مغوغة (المقاطعة)
01.511.01.06.	Charf-Souani (Arrond.)	30,760	117,557	376	117,181	الشرف السواني (المقاطعة)
01.511.01.07.	Tanger-Médina (Arrond.)	66,127	243,082	3,718	239,364	طنجة المدينة (المقاطعة)
01.511.01.09.	Gueznaia (Mun.)	6,100	23,601	20	23,581	كزناية (البلدية)
01.511.03.	Cercle : Assilah	11,238	53,109	28	53,081	دائرة : أصيلة
01.511.03.01.	Al Manzla	568	2,650	0	2,650	المنزلة
01.511.03.03.	Aquouass Briech	983	4,993	5	4,988	أقواس برييش
01.511.03.05.	Sebt Azzinate	1,113	5,153	0	5,153	سبت الزينات
01.511.03.07.	Dar Chaoui	910	4,303	1	4,302	دار الشاوي
01.511.03.07.3.	Dont Centre: Dar Chaoui	308	1,283	1	1,282	مركز: دار الشاوي
01.511.03.11.	Sahel Chamali	1,166	5,358	9	5,349	الساحل الشمالي
01.511.03.13.	Sidi Lyamani	2,102	10,365	3	10,362	سيدي اليمني
01.511.03.13.3.	Dont Centre: Tnine Sidi Lyamani	233	1,058	0	1,058	مركز: اثنين سيدي اليمني
01.511.03.15.	Had Al Gharbia	2,567	12,274	8	12,266	حد الغربية
01.511.03.17.	Laaouama	1,829	8,013	2	8,011	العوامة
01.511.81.	Cercle : -	2,210	9,792	13	9,779	دائرة : -
01.511.81.05.	HJAR ENNHAL	2,210	9,792	13	9,779	حجر النحل
01.571.	Province: Tétouan	126,969	550,374	605	549,769	إقليم: تطوان
01.571.01.07.	Oued Laou (Mun.)	2,441	9,665	6	9,659	واد لو (البلدية)
01.571.01.11.	Tétouan (Mun.)	92,606	380,787	564	380,223	تطوان (البلدية)
01.571.03.	Cercle : Jebala	13,286	63,469	11	63,458	دائرة : جبالة
01.571.03.01.	Ain Lahsan	1,523	6,742	1	6,741	عين لحصن
01.571.03.03.	AL Kharroub	520	2,510	0	2,510	الخروب
01.571.03.05.	Bghaghza	1,331	6,955	0	6,955	ابغاغزة
01.571.03.07.	Bni Harchen	1,474	6,953	0	6,953	بني حرشن
01.571.03.09.	Jbel Lahbib	885	3,780	1	3,779	جبل لحبيب
01.571.03.09.3.	Dont Centre: Karia	272	1,091	0	1,091	مركز: القرية
01.571.03.11.	Bni Idder	864	4,823	0	4,823	بني يدر
01.571.03.15.	Mallalienne	2,088	9,177	8	9,169	ملاليين
01.571.03.17.	Saddina	1,417	6,670	0	6,670	صدينة
01.571.03.19.	Souk Kdim	1,625	7,823	1	7,822	سوق القديم
01.571.03.21.	Sahtryine	1,559	8,036	0	8,036	السحتريين
01.571.05.	Cercle : Tétouan	18,636	96,453	24	96,429	دائرة : تطوان
01.571.05.01.	Al Hamra	2,005	11,118	0	11,118	الحمراء
01.571.05.05.	Al Oued	1,918	11,288	0	11,288	الواد
01.571.05.07.	Azla	3,563	16,128	9	16,119	ازلا
01.571.05.13.	Bni Leit	889	5,324	0	5,324	بني ليت
01.571.05.15.	Bni Said	1,790	9,103	2	9,101	بني سعيد
01.571.05.17.	Dar Bni Karrich	1,914	8,499	10	8,489	دار بني قريش
01.571.05.17.3.	Dont Centre: Dar Bni Karrich	1,465	6,430	10	6,420	مركز: دار بني قريش
01.571.05.19.	Oulad Ali Mansour	806	5,306	0	5,306	أولاد علي منصور
01.571.05.23.	Zaitoune	2,244	10,481	1	10,480	زيتون
01.571.05.25.	Zaouiat Sidi Kacem	2,112	11,537	2	11,535	زاوية سيدي قاسم
01.571.05.27.	Zinat	1,395	7,669	0	7,669	زينات
01.573.	Préfecture: M'Diq-Fnideq	51,139	209,897	579	209,318	عمالة: المضيق - الفنيدق
01.573.01.01.	Fnideq (Mun.)	18,491	77,436	187	77,249	الفنيدق (البلدية)
01.573.01.03.	Martil (Mun.)	16,578	64,355	267	64,088	مرتيل (البلدية)
01.573.01.05.	M'Diq (Mun.)	13,435	56,227	81	56,146	المضيق (البلدية)
01.573.03.	Cercle : -	2,635	11,879	44	11,835	دائرة : -
01.573.03.03.	Allyene	1,518	6,583	3	6,580	عليين
01.573.03.05.	Belyounech	1,117	5,296	41	5,255	بليونش
02.	Oriental	494,530	2,314,346	3,954	2,310,392	الشرق
02.113.	Province: Berkane	66,372	289,137	607	288,530	إقليم: بركان
02.113.01.01.	Ahfir (Mun.)	4,705	19,630	135	19,495	احفير (البلدية)
02.113.01.05.	Ain Erreggada (Mun.)	639	2,694	6	2,688	عين الركادة (البلدية)
02.113.01.07.	Aklim (Mun.)	2,194	9,695	0	9,695	اكليم (البلدية)
02.113.01.09.	Berkane (Mun.)	26,087	109,237	224	109,013	بركان (البلدية)
02.113.01.25.	Saidia (Mun.)	2,188	8,780	60	8,720	السعيدية (البلدية)
02.113.01.29.	Sidi Slimane Echcharraa (Mun.)	6,699	30,202	52	30,150	سيدي سليمان - الشراعة (البلدية)
02.113.03.	Cercle : Ahfir	11,023	48,479	116	48,363	دائرة : احفير
02.113.03.01.	Aghbal	3,405	14,908	76	14,832	اغبال
02.113.03.07.	Fezouane	1,183	5,089	4	5,085	فزوان
02.113.03.09.	Laatamna	3,183	13,996	27	13,969	لعثامنة
02.113.03.11.	Madagh	3,252	14,486	9	14,477	مداغ
02.113.03.11.3.	Dont Centre: Madagh	595	2,452	3	2,449	مركز: مداغ
02.113.05.	Cercle : Aklim	12,837	60,420	14	60,406	دائرة : اكليم
02.113.05.03.	Boughriba	4,374	20,513	3	20,510	بوغريبة
02.113.05.05.	Chouihia	2,483	12,245	2	12,243	شويحية
02.113.05.13.	Rislane	820	4,265	2	4,263	رسلان
02.113.05.15.	Sidi Bouhria	961	4,525	2	4,523	سيدي بوهرية
02.113.05.17.	Tafoughalt	619	2,735	1	2,734	تافوغالت
02.113.05.19.	Zegzel	3,580	16,137	4	16,133	زكزل
02.167.	Province: Driouch	43,935	211,059	39	211,020	إقليم: الدريوش
02.167.01.03.	Ben Taieb (Mun.)	3,122	14,257	0	14,257	بن الطيب (البلدية)
02.167.01.09.	Driouch (Mun.)	3,285	14,741	8	14,733	الدريوش (البلدية)
02.167.01.13.	Midar (Mun.)	3,306	15,021	1	15,020	ميضار (البلدية)
02.167.03.	Cercle : Driouch	12,008	60,277	5	60,272	دائرة : الدريوش
02.167.03.01.	Ain Zohra	1,917	10,601	0	10,601	عين الزهرة
02.167.03.03.	Ait Mait	1,155	5,613	0	5,613	أيت مايت
02.167.03.05.	Amejjaou	1,076	4,988	0	4,988	امجاو
02.167.03.07.	Dar El Kebdani	2,258	9,911	3	9,908	دار الكبداني
02.167.03.07.3.	Dont Centre: Dar El Kebdani	863	3,608	1	3,607	مركز: دار الكبداني
02.167.03.09.	Mtalssa	3,357	16,787	1	16,786	امطالسة
02.167.03.11.	Oulad Boubker	1,378	8,054	1	8,053	أولاد بوبكر
02.167.03.13.	Tazaghine	867	4,323	0	4,323	تزاغين
02.167.09.	Cercle : Rif	22,214	106,763	25	106,738	دائرة : الريف
02.167.09.01.	Azlaf	1,082	4,919	1	4,918	ازلاف
02.167.09.05.	Bni Marghnine	1,436	6,263	2	6,261	بني مرغنين
02.167.09.07.	Boudinar	2,063	9,863	3	9,860	بودينار
02.167.09.09.	Iferni	1,372	6,365	2	6,363	افرني
02.167.09.11.	Ijermaouas	1,465	7,540	1	7,539	اجرماواس
02.167.09.15.	M'Hajer	1,973	9,386	3	9,383	امهاجر
02.167.09.17.	Ouardana	1,463	7,120	8	7,112	وردانة
02.167.09.19.	Oulad Amghar	1,142	6,010	1	6,009	اولاد امغار
02.167.09.21.	Tafersit	1,967	9,133	0	9,133	تفرسيت
02.167.09.21.3.	Dont Centre: Tafersit	694	3,137	0	3,137	مركز: تفرسيت
02.167.09.23.	Talilit	1,130	5,208	1	5,207	تليليت
02.167.09.25.	Temsamane	2,989	13,920	2	13,918	تمسمان
02.167.09.25.3.	Dont Centre: Kourouna	619	2,585	1	2,584	مركز: كرونة
02.167.09.27.	Trougout	2,211	11,458	0	11,458	اتروكوت
02.167.09.29.	Tsaft	1,921	9,578	1	9,577	اتصافت
02.167.09.29.3.	Dont Centre: Kassita	596	2,675	1	2,674	مركز: قاسيطة
02.251.	Province: Figuig	28,439	138,325	41	138,284	إقليم: فجيج
02.251.01.01.	Bouarfa (Mun.)	5,964	28,846	13	28,833	بوعرفة (البلدية)
02.251.01.03.	Figuig (Mun.)	2,774	10,872	11	10,861	فجيج (البلدية)
02.251.03.	Cercle : Bni Tadjite	13,999	66,488	13	66,475	دائرة : بني تادجيت
02.251.03.01.	Ain Chouater	193	1,006	1	1,005	عين الشواطر
02.251.03.03.	Bni Tadjite	3,372	16,149	8	16,141	بني تادجيت
02.251.03.03.3.	Dont Centre: Bni Tadjite	1,839	8,489	8	8,481	مركز: بني تادجيت
02.251.03.05.	Bouanane	1,731	10,035	0	10,035	بوعنان
02.251.03.05.3.	Dont Centre: Bouanane	680	3,329	0	3,329	مركز: بوعنان
02.251.03.07.	Bouchaouene	2,656	13,057	1	13,056	بوشاوون
02.251.03.09.	Boumerieme	1,907	8,521	0	8,521	بو مريم
02.251.03.11.	Talsint	3,800	16,166	3	16,163	تالسينت
02.251.03.11.3.	Dont Centre: Talsint	2,261	9,079	2	9,077	مركز: تالسينت
02.251.03.13.	Ain Chair	340	1,554	0	1,554	عين الشعير
02.251.05.	Cercle : Figuig	5,702	32,119	4	32,115	دائرة : فجيج
02.251.05.01.	Abbou Lakhal	290	2,017	1	2,016	عبو لكحل
02.251.05.03.	Bni Guil	1,305	6,726	0	6,726	بني كيل
02.251.05.05.	Maatarka	1,381	7,986	0	7,986	معتركة
02.251.05.07.	Tendrara	2,726	15,390	3	15,387	تندرارة
02.251.05.07.3.	Dont Centre: Tendrara	1,605	8,507	3	8,504	مركز: تندرارة
02.265.	Province: Guercif	40,666	216,717	75	216,642	إقليم: جرسيف
02.265.01.03.	Guercif (Mun.)	18,779	90,880	52	90,828	جرسيف (البلدية)
02.265.05.	Cercle : Guercif	14,510	83,611	23	83,588	دائرة : جرسيف
02.265.05.01.	Assebbab	1,083	7,069	0	7,069	الصباب
02.265.05.03.	Barkine	1,522	9,469	0	9,469	بركين
02.265.05.05.	Houara Oulad Raho	5,927	31,462	17	31,445	هوارة أولاد رحو
02.265.05.07.	Lamrija	2,485	14,563	2	14,561	لمريجة
02.265.05.15.	Saka	3,493	21,048	4	21,044	صاكة
02.265.07.	Cercle : Taddart	7,377	42,226	0	42,226	دائرة : تادرت
02.265.07.09.	Mazguitam	1,382	8,087	0	8,087	مزكيتام
02.265.07.11.	Oulad Bourima	296	1,486	0	1,486	أولاد بوريمة
02.265.07.13.	Ras Laksar	1,771	10,515	0	10,515	راس القصر
02.265.07.17.	Taddart	3,928	22,138	0	22,138	تادرت
02.275.	Province: Jerada	20,983	108,727	99	108,628	إقليم: جرادة
02.275.01.03.	Ain Bni Mathar (Mun.)	3,180	16,289	58	16,231	عين بني مطهر (البلدية)
02.275.01.17.	Jerada (Mun.)	8,953	43,506	16	43,490	جرادة (البلدية)
02.275.01.35.	Touissit (Mun.)	721	3,137	3	3,134	تويسيت (البلدية)
02.275.03.	Cercle : Jerada Banlieue	4,613	23,837	17	23,820	دائرة : أحواز جرادة
02.275.03.03.	Gafait	486	2,656	0	2,656	كفايت
02.275.03.05.	Guenfouda	1,167	5,591	1	5,590	كنفودة
02.275.03.07.	Laaouinate	703	3,867	0	3,867	لعوينات
02.275.03.09.	Lebkhata	466	2,612	0	2,612	لبخاتة
02.275.03.13.	Ras Asfour	252	1,274	4	1,270	رأس عصفور
02.275.03.15.	Sidi Boubker	568	2,638	8	2,630	سيدي بوبكر
02.275.03.15.3.	Dont Centre: Sidi Boubker	421	1,894	5	1,889	مركز: سيدي بوبكر
02.275.03.21.	Tiouli	971	5,199	4	5,195	تيولي
02.275.03.21.3.	Dont Centre: Oued El Heimer	275	1,282	0	1,282	مركز: واد الحيمر
02.275.05.	Cercle : Ain Bni Mathar	3,516	21,958	5	21,953	دائرة : عين بني مطهر
02.275.05.01.	Bni Mathar	1,469	8,870	1	8,869	بني مطهر
02.275.05.11.	Mrija	581	3,359	1	3,358	مريجة
02.275.05.13.	Oulad Ghziyel	1,074	7,522	0	7,522	أولاد غزييل
02.275.05.15.	Oulad Sidi Abdelhakem	392	2,207	3	2,204	أولاد سيدي عبد الحاكم
02.381.	Province: Nador	125,951	565,426	483	564,943	إقليم: الناضور
02.381.01.01.	Al Aaroui (Mun.)	10,132	47,599	13	47,586	العروي (البلدية)
02.381.01.03.	Bni Ansar (Mun.)	12,897	56,582	67	56,515	بني انصار (البلدية)
02.381.01.05.	Nador (Mun.)	37,565	161,726	283	161,443	الناضور (البلدية)
02.381.01.07.	Zaio (Mun.)	8,282	35,806	19	35,787	زايو (البلدية)
02.381.01.09.	Zeghanghane (Mun.)	7,941	34,025	21	34,004	ازغنغان (البلدية)
02.381.01.15.	Ras El Ma (Mun.)	1,836	7,580	13	7,567	رأس الماء (البلدية)
02.381.01.19.	Selouane (Mun.)	5,025	21,570	13	21,557	سلوان (البلدية)
02.381.05.	Cercle : Guelaia	25,783	120,145	36	120,109	دائرة : قلعية
02.381.05.01.	Bni Bouifrour	1,400	6,418	2	6,416	بني بويفرور
02.381.05.03.	Bni Chiker	5,619	26,884	13	26,871	بني شيكر
02.381.05.03.3.	Dont Centre: Bni Chiker	1,002	4,444	1	4,443	مركز: بني شيكر
02.381.05.05.	Bni Sidel Jbel	2,002	8,930	2	8,928	بني سيدال الجبل
02.381.05.07.	Bni Sidel Louta	1,389	6,283	0	6,283	بني سيدال لوطا
02.381.05.09.	Bouarg	7,889	37,737	10	37,727	بوعرك
02.381.05.13.	Iaazzanene	2,425	11,131	4	11,127	ايعزانن
02.381.05.15.	Ihaddadene	3,189	14,345	2	14,343	ايحدادن
02.381.05.15.3.	Dont Centre: Bouizazarene Ihaddadene	2,929	13,120	2	13,118	مركز: بويزازارن ايحدادن
02.381.05.17.	Iksane	1,870	8,417	3	8,414	ايكسان
02.381.07.	Cercle : Louta	16,490	80,393	18	80,375	دائرة : لوطا
02.381.07.01.	Afsou	467	2,932	0	2,932	افسو
02.381.07.03.	Al Barkanyene	565	2,540	0	2,540	البركانيين
02.381.07.05.	Arekmane	4,180	18,490	7	18,483	اركمان
02.381.07.05.3.	Dont Centre: Kariat Arekmane	1,300	5,387	2	5,385	مركز: قرية اركمان
02.381.07.07.	Bni Oukil Oulad M'Hand	2,060	10,697	4	10,693	بني وكيل اولاد امحاند
02.381.07.09.	Hassi Berkane	1,585	8,788	0	8,788	حاسي بركان
02.381.07.11.	Oulad Daoud Zkhanine	942	3,940	1	3,939	أولاد داوود ازخانين
02.381.07.13.	Oulad Settout	4,723	23,218	3	23,215	أولاد ستوت
02.381.07.17.	Tiztoutine	1,968	9,788	3	9,785	تزطوطين
02.381.07.17.3.	Dont Centre: Tiztoutine	1,001	4,784	0	4,784	مركز: تيزطوطين
02.411.	Préfecture: Oujda-Angad	124,508	551,767	2,487	549,280	عمالة: وجدة - أنكاد
02.411.01.11.	Bni Drar (Mun.)	2,268	10,934	36	10,898	بني درار (البلدية)
02.411.01.19.	Naima (Mun.)	233	1,088	0	1,088	النعيمة (البلدية)
02.411.01.23.	Oujda (Mun.)	113,020	494,252	2,321	491,931	وجدة (البلدية)
02.411.03.	Cercle : Oujda Banlieue Nord	5,471	26,859	129	26,730	دائرة : أحواز وجدة الشمالية
02.411.03.01.	Ahl Angad	2,937	14,196	114	14,082	أهل انكاد
02.411.03.03.	Ain Sfa	880	4,490	1	4,489	عين الصفا
02.411.03.05.	Bni Khaled	1,367	6,745	14	6,731	بني خالد
02.411.03.07.	Bsara	287	1,428	0	1,428	ابصارة
02.411.05.	Cercle : Oujda Banlieue Sud	3,516	18,634	1	18,633	دائرة : أحواز وجدة الجنوبية
02.411.05.09.	Isly	1,204	6,710	1	6,709	ايسلي
02.411.05.11.	Mestferki	866	4,378	0	4,378	مستفركي
02.411.05.17.	Sidi Boulenouar	628	3,452	0	3,452	سيدي بولنوار
02.411.05.19.	Sidi Moussa Lemhaya	818	4,094	0	4,094	سيدي موسى المهاية
02.533.	Province: Taourirt	43,676	233,188	123	233,065	إقليم: تاوريرت
02.533.01.13.	Debdou (Mun.)	1,137	4,960	4	4,956	دبدو (البلدية)
02.533.01.15.	El Aioun Sidi Mellouk (Mun.)	8,625	41,832	78	41,754	العيون سيدي ملوك (البلدية)
02.533.01.33.	Taourirt (Mun.)	20,182	103,398	33	103,365	تاوريرت (البلدية)
02.533.03.	Cercle : Debdou	4,363	28,768	2	28,766	دائرة : دبدو
02.533.03.05.	El Atef	485	3,215	0	3,215	العاطف
02.533.03.15.	Oulad M'hammed	188	1,310	0	1,310	أولاد امحمد
02.533.03.17.	Sidi Ali Bel Quassem	2,185	14,984	1	14,983	سيدي علي بلقاسم
02.533.03.19.	Sidi Lahsen	1,505	9,259	1	9,258	سيدي لحسن
02.533.07.	Cercle : El Aioun	4,749	26,820	5	26,815	دائرة : العيون
02.533.07.03.	Ain Lehjer	1,416	8,272	5	8,267	عين الحجر
02.533.07.09.	Mechraa Hammadi	1,066	5,646	0	5,646	مشرع حمادي
02.533.07.13.	Mestegmer	1,196	6,469	0	6,469	مستكمر
02.533.07.21.	Tancherfi	1,071	6,433	0	6,433	تنشرفي
02.533.09.	Cercle : Taourirt	4,620	27,410	1	27,409	دائرة : تاوريرت
02.533.09.01.	Ahl Oued Za	1,955	11,931	0	11,931	أهل واد زا
02.533.09.07.	Gteter	1,194	7,303	0	7,303	كطيطر
02.533.09.11.	Melg El Ouidane	1,471	8,176	1	8,175	ملك الويدان
03.	Fès-Meknès	919,497	4,236,892	5,728	4,231,164	فاس - مكناس
03.061.	Préfecture: Meknès	192,654	835,695	1,269	834,426	عمالة: مكناس
03.061.01.01.	Meknès (Mun.)	126,319	520,428	1,132	519,296	مكناس (البلدية)
03.061.01.03.	Al Machouar - Stinia (Mun.)	1,264	4,664	11	4,653	المشور الستينية (البلدية)
03.061.01.05.	Boufakrane (Mun.)	2,902	12,941	15	12,926	بوفكران (البلدية)
03.061.01.07.	Toulal (Mun.)	4,434	19,077	19	19,058	تولال (البلدية)
03.061.01.09.	Moulay Driss Zerhoun (Mun.)	3,022	11,615	12	11,603	مولاي ادريس زرهون (البلدية)
03.061.01.11.	Ouislane (Mun.)	19,562	87,910	30	87,880	ويسلان (البلدية)
03.061.03.	Cercle : Ain Orma	8,319	46,758	15	46,743	دائرة : عين عرمة
03.061.03.01.	Ain Jemaa	2,531	15,265	3	15,262	عين جمعة
03.061.03.01.3.	Dont Centre: Ain Jemaa	555	2,489	1	2,488	مركز: عين جمعة
03.061.03.02.	Ain Karma- Oued Rommane	2,663	13,828	1	13,827	عين كرمة-واد الرمان
03.061.03.02.3.	Dont Centre: Ain Karma	998	4,920	1	4,919	مركز: عين كرمة
03.061.03.05.	Ain Orma	798	3,495	1	3,494	عين عرمة
03.061.03.07.	Ait Ouallal	1,201	5,330	6	5,324	أيت ولال
03.061.03.09.	Dar Oum Soltane	1,126	8,840	4	8,836	دار أم السلطان
03.061.05.	Cercle : Meknès Banlieue	18,052	89,463	32	89,431	دائرة : أحواز مكناس
03.061.05.01.	Dkhissa	4,143	19,908	12	19,896	الدخيسة
03.061.05.01.3.	Dont Centre: Zoualet	2,106	10,060	2	10,058	مركز: ازوالات
03.061.05.03.	Majjate	1,918	9,074	1	9,073	مجاط
03.061.05.05.	M'haya	4,875	26,395	9	26,386	مهاية
03.061.05.05.3.	Dont Centre: M'haya	1,182	5,819	5	5,814	مركز: مهاية
03.061.05.07.	Oued Jdida	2,970	14,935	2	14,933	واد الجديدة
03.061.05.09.	Sidi Slimane Moul Al Kifane	4,146	19,151	8	19,143	سيدي سليمان مول الكيفان
03.061.05.09.3.	Dont Centre: Haj Kaddour	1,528	6,508	1	6,507	مركز: الحاج قدور
03.061.07.	Cercle : Zerhoun	8,780	42,839	3	42,836	دائرة : زرهون
03.061.07.01.	Charqaoua	909	5,526	0	5,526	شرقاوة
03.061.07.05.	MRhassiyine	1,835	8,001	1	8,000	مغاصيين
03.061.07.07.	N'zalat Bni Amar	1,932	8,350	1	8,349	نزالة بني عمار
03.061.07.07.3.	Dont Centre: N'zalat	295	1,144	1	1,143	مركز: النزلات
03.061.07.09.	Oualili	2,156	9,735	1	9,734	وليلي
03.061.07.11.	Sidi Abdallah Al Khayat	1,948	11,227	0	11,227	سيدي عبد الله الخياط
03.131.	Province: Boulemane	39,219	197,596	86	197,510	إقليم: بولمان
03.131.01.01.	Boulemane (Mun.)	1,803	7,104	2	7,102	بولمان (البلدية)
03.131.01.02.	Imouzzer Marmoucha (Mun.)	1,027	4,213	0	4,213	ايموزار مرموشة (البلدية)
03.131.01.03.	Missour (Mun.)	5,923	25,584	13	25,571	ميسور (البلدية)
03.131.01.05.	Outat El Haj (Mun.)	3,523	16,388	1	16,387	أوطاط الحاج (البلدية)
03.131.03.	Cercle : Boulemane	12,585	57,834	14	57,820	دائرة : بولمان
03.131.03.01.	Ait Bazza	615	2,955	0	2,955	أيت بازة
03.131.03.03.	Ait El Mane	422	1,927	1	1,926	أيت المان
03.131.03.05.	Almis Marmoucha	475	2,461	0	2,461	الميس مرموشة
03.131.03.07.	El Mers	1,167	5,152	0	5,152	المرس
03.131.03.09.	Enjil	1,796	8,364	9	8,355	انجيل
03.131.03.11.	Guigou	4,610	21,607	2	21,605	كيكو
03.131.03.11.3.	Dont Centre: Guigou	2,355	10,129	2	10,127	مركز: كيكو
03.131.03.13.	Serghina	800	3,746	1	3,745	سرغينة
03.131.03.15.	Skoura M'Daz	2,082	8,462	1	8,461	سكورة مداز
03.131.03.15.3.	Dont Centre: Skoura	589	2,271	0	2,271	مركز: سكورة
03.131.03.17.	Talzemt	618	3,160	0	3,160	تالزمت
03.131.05.	Cercle : Missour	4,979	26,180	48	26,132	دائرة : ميسور
03.131.05.01.	Ksabi Moulouya	1,922	10,614	0	10,614	القصابي ملوية
03.131.05.03.	Ouizeght	1,065	5,743	0	5,743	ويزغت
03.131.05.05.	Sidi Boutayeb	1,992	9,823	48	9,775	سيدي بوطيب
03.131.07.	Cercle : Outat El Haj	9,379	60,293	8	60,285	دائرة : أوطاط الحاج
03.131.07.01.	El Orjane	1,332	7,740	4	7,736	العرجان
03.131.07.03.	Ermila	1,399	7,690	1	7,689	الرميلة
03.131.07.05.	Fritissa	4,053	29,460	0	29,460	افريطيسة
03.131.07.07.	Oulad Ali Youssef	906	5,212	1	5,211	أولاد علي يوسف
03.131.07.09.	Tissaf	1,689	10,191	2	10,189	تيساف
03.171.	Province: El Hajeb	53,230	247,016	74	246,942	إقليم: الحاجب
03.171.01.01.	Agourai (Mun.)	3,770	16,651	8	16,643	اكوراي (البلدية)
03.171.01.03.	Ain Taoujdate (Mun.)	6,486	28,288	12	28,276	عين تاوجطات (البلدية)
03.171.01.05.	El Hajeb (Mun.)	8,633	35,282	18	35,264	الحاجب (البلدية)
03.171.01.07.	Sabaa Aiyoun (Mun.)	5,570	26,277	6	26,271	سبع عيون (البلدية)
03.171.03.	Cercle : Agourai	7,713	37,763	7	37,756	دائرة : أكوراي
03.171.03.01.	Ait Ouikhalfen	676	3,849	2	3,847	أيت ويخلفن
03.171.03.03.	Ait Yaazem	3,457	16,091	4	16,087	أيت يعزم
03.171.03.03.3.	Dont Centre: Kantina	764	3,642	2	3,640	مركز: كانتينة
03.171.03.05.	Jahjouh	1,553	7,485	1	7,484	جحجوح
03.171.03.05.3.	Dont Centre: Sebt Jahjouh	836	3,750	0	3,750	مركز: سبت جحجوح
03.171.03.07.	Ras Ijerri	1,342	6,502	0	6,502	رأس اجري
03.171.03.09.	Tamchachate	685	3,836	0	3,836	تامشاشاط
03.171.05.	Cercle : Ain Taoujdate	16,340	79,400	17	79,383	دائرة : عين تاوجطات
03.171.05.01.	Ait Boubidmane	4,218	19,501	5	19,496	أيت بوبيدمان
03.171.05.01.3.	Dont Centre: Bouderbala	1,844	7,907	4	7,903	مركز: بودربالة
03.171.05.03.	Ait Harz Allah	2,663	13,555	3	13,552	أيت حرز الله
03.171.05.05.	Bitit	2,880	14,316	3	14,313	بطيط
03.171.05.07.	Laqsir	6,579	32,028	6	32,022	لقصير
03.171.07.	Cercle : El Hajeb	4,718	23,355	6	23,349	دائرة : الحاجب
03.171.07.01.	Ait Bourzouine	1,652	8,289	5	8,284	أيت بورزوين
03.171.07.03.	Ait Naamane	1,194	6,307	1	6,306	أيت نعمان
03.171.07.05.	Iqaddar	1,872	8,759	0	8,759	اقدار
03.231.	Préfecture: Fès	265,036	1,150,131	3,521	1,146,610	عمالة: فاس
03.231.01.01.	Agdal (Arrond.)	37,421	142,407	1,457	140,950	أكدال (المقاطعة)
03.231.01.03.	Méchouar Fès Jdid (Mun.)	5,416	20,560	23	20,537	المشور فاس الجديد (البلدية)
03.231.01.05.	Saiss (Arrond.)	48,983	207,345	1,413	205,932	سايس (المقاطعة)
03.231.01.07.	Fès-Médina (Arrond.)	17,342	70,592	212	70,380	فاس المدينة (المقاطعة)
03.231.01.09.	Jnan El Ouard (Arrond.)	43,333	201,011	47	200,964	جنان الورد (المقاطعة)
03.231.01.11.	El Mariniyine (Arrond.)	47,898	209,494	109	209,385	المرينيين (المقاطعة)
03.231.01.13.	Zouagha (Arrond.)	57,346	260,663	254	260,409	زواغة (المقاطعة)
03.231.81.	Cercle : Fès Banlieue	7,297	38,059	6	38,053	دائرة : احواز فاس
03.231.81.01.	Oulad Tayeb	4,626	24,594	6	24,588	أولاد الطيب
03.231.81.01.3.	Dont Centre: Ouled Tayeb	2,848	14,187	4	14,183	مركز: اولاد الطيب
03.231.81.03.	Ain Bida	1,443	7,843	0	7,843	عين البيضاء
03.231.81.05.	Sidi Harazem	1,228	5,622	0	5,622	سيدي حرازم
03.231.81.05.3.	Dont Centre: Skhinate	822	3,509	0	3,509	مركز: السخينات
03.271.	Province: Ifrane	35,859	155,221	325	154,896	إقليم: إفران
03.271.01.01.	Azrou (Mun.)	13,854	54,350	73	54,277	ازرو (البلدية)
03.271.01.03.	Ifrane (Mun.)	3,373	14,659	237	14,422	إفران (البلدية)
03.271.03.	Cercle : Azrou	14,565	65,665	13	65,652	دائرة : أزرو
03.271.03.01.	Ain Leuh	2,452	9,669	4	9,665	عين اللوح
03.271.03.01.3.	Dont Centre: Ain Leuh	1,381	4,969	3	4,966	مركز: عين اللوح
03.271.03.03.	Ben Smim	1,447	6,506	1	6,505	بن صميم
03.271.03.05.	Oued Ifrane	2,358	10,805	2	10,803	واد إفران
03.271.03.05.3.	Dont Centre: Souk L'had	758	2,723	1	2,722	مركز: سوق الحد
03.271.03.07.	Sidi El Makhfi	3,710	16,709	3	16,706	سيدي المخفي
03.271.03.07.3.	Dont Centre: Sidi Addi	1,102	4,217	1	4,216	مركز: سيدي عدي
03.271.03.09.	Tigrigra	2,375	11,031	3	11,028	تيكريكرة
03.271.03.11.	Timahdite	2,223	10,945	0	10,945	تيمحضيت
03.271.03.11.3.	Dont Centre: Timahdite	867	3,567	0	3,567	مركز: تيمحضيت
03.271.81.	Cercle : -	4,067	20,547	2	20,545	دائرة : -
03.271.81.01.	Dayat Aoua	2,048	9,854	1	9,853	ضاية عوا
03.271.81.03.	Tizguite	2,019	10,693	1	10,692	تيزكيت
03.451.	Province: Sefrou	66,034	286,489	203	286,286	إقليم: صفرو
03.451.01.01.	Bhalil (Mun.)	3,468	12,997	9	12,988	البهاليل (البلدية)
03.451.01.03.	El Menzel (Mun.)	3,142	12,641	6	12,635	المنزل (البلدية)
03.451.01.05.	Imouzzer Kandar (Mun.)	4,571	19,125	20	19,105	إيموزار كندر (البلدية)
03.451.01.07.	Ribate El Kheir (Mun.)	3,979	16,739	17	16,722	رباط الخير (البلدية)
03.451.01.09.	Sefrou (Mun.)	20,236	79,887	118	79,769	صفرو (البلدية)
03.451.03.	Cercle : El Menzel	11,067	50,319	5	50,314	دائرة : المنزل
03.451.03.01.	Adrej	415	1,709	0	1,709	عدرج
03.451.03.03.	Ain Timguenai	1,399	6,519	0	6,519	عين تمكناي
03.451.03.03.3.	Dont Centre: Zaouiat Bougrine	887	4,112	0	4,112	مركز: زاوية بوكرين
03.451.03.05.	Bir Tam Tam	2,049	9,141	2	9,139	بئر طم طم
03.451.03.07.	Dar El Hamra	949	4,018	1	4,017	دار الحمراء
03.451.03.09.	Ighzrane	2,039	9,626	0	9,626	اغزران
03.451.03.11.	Mtarnagha	996	4,554	0	4,554	امطرناغة
03.451.03.13.	Oulad Mkoudou	1,504	6,667	0	6,667	أولاد امكودو
03.451.03.15.	Ras Tabouda	1,391	6,388	2	6,386	راس تابودة
03.451.03.17.	Tafajight	325	1,697	0	1,697	تافجيغت
03.451.05.	Cercle : Imouzzer Kandar	7,637	37,922	26	37,896	دائرة : إيموزار كندر
03.451.05.01.	Ain Cheggag	4,048	20,456	26	20,430	عين الشكاك
03.451.05.01.3.	Dont Centre: Ain Cheggag	2,115	10,124	21	10,103	مركز: عين الشكاك
03.451.05.03.	Ait Sebaa Lajrouf	3,589	17,466	0	17,466	أيت السبع لجرف
03.451.07.	Cercle : Sefrou	11,934	56,859	2	56,857	دائرة : صفرو
03.451.07.01.	Aghbalou Aqorar	2,102	9,715	1	9,714	اغبالو اقورار
03.451.07.03.	Ahl Sidi Lahcen	923	4,287	0	4,287	أهل سيدي لحسن
03.451.07.05.	Azzaba	1,451	6,444	0	6,444	عزابة
03.451.07.07.	Kandar Sidi Khiar	1,702	9,323	0	9,323	كندر سيدي خيار
03.451.07.09.	Laanoussar	1,706	8,501	0	8,501	العنوصر
03.451.07.11.	Sidi YoussefBen Ahmed	2,696	12,362	1	12,361	سيدي يوسف بن أحمد
03.451.07.13.	Tazouta	1,354	6,227	0	6,227	تازوطة
03.531.	Province: Taounate	128,719	662,246	81	662,165	إقليم: تاونات
03.531.01.01.	Ghafsai (Mun.)	1,546	6,361	20	6,341	غفساي (البلدية)
03.531.01.03.	Karia Ba Mohamed (Mun.)	4,158	18,762	9	18,753	قرية با محمد (البلدية)
03.531.01.05.	Taounate (Mun.)	8,583	37,616	24	37,592	تاونات (البلدية)
03.531.01.07.	Thar Es-souk (Mun.)	1,165	5,182	0	5,182	طهر السوق (البلدية)
03.531.01.09.	Tissa (Mun.)	2,298	11,195	0	11,195	تيسة (البلدية)
03.531.03.	Cercle : Ghafsai	33,533	157,245	3	157,242	دائرة : غفساي
03.531.03.01.	El Bibane	1,488	6,303	0	6,303	البيبان
03.531.03.03.	Galaz	3,866	17,333	0	17,333	كلاز
03.531.03.05.	Kissane	3,036	13,390	0	13,390	كيسان
03.531.03.07.	Oudka	1,888	8,494	0	8,494	ودكة
03.531.03.09.	Ouartzagh	3,193	14,381	1	14,380	اورتزاغ
03.531.03.11.	Ratba	3,649	16,825	1	16,824	الرتبة
03.531.03.13.	Sidi Haj M'hamed	1,798	9,326	0	9,326	سيدي الحاج امحمد
03.531.03.15.	Sidi Mokhfi	1,845	8,705	0	8,705	سيدي المخفي
03.531.03.17.	Sidi YahyaBni Zeroual	3,111	15,452	0	15,452	سيدي يحيى بني زروال
03.531.03.19.	Tabouda	3,408	16,618	1	16,617	تابودة
03.531.03.21.	Tafrant	2,979	14,246	0	14,246	تافرانت
03.531.03.23.	Timezgana	3,272	16,172	0	16,172	تمزكانة
03.531.05.	Cercle : Karia Ba Mohamed	23,606	134,923	2	134,921	دائرة : قرية با محمد
03.531.05.01.	Bni Snous	1,667	8,811	0	8,811	بني سنوس
03.531.05.03.	Bouchabel	2,765	16,084	0	16,084	بوشابل
03.531.05.05.	Rhouazi	3,190	18,081	1	18,080	اغوازي
03.531.05.07.	Jbabra	3,193	18,592	0	18,592	اجبابرة
03.531.05.09.	Loulja	2,620	15,956	0	15,956	لولجة
03.531.05.11.	Mkansa	3,746	23,155	0	23,155	امكانسة
03.531.05.13.	Moulay Abdelkrim	1,455	7,392	0	7,392	مولاي عبد الكريم
03.531.05.15.	Moulay Bouchta	2,947	14,347	1	14,346	مولاي بوشتى
03.531.05.17.	Sidi El Abed	2,023	12,505	0	12,505	سيدي العابد
03.531.07.	Cercle : Taounate	26,562	133,164	15	133,149	دائرة : تاونات
03.531.07.01.	Ain Mediouna	3,270	15,770	3	15,767	عين مديونة
03.531.07.03.	Bni Oulid	2,101	10,324	0	10,324	بني وليد
03.531.07.05.	Bni Ounjel Tafraout	1,326	6,962	0	6,962	بني ونجل تافراوت
03.531.07.07.	Bouadel	2,502	12,684	2	12,682	بوعادل
03.531.07.09.	Bouhouda	4,976	26,236	0	26,236	بوهودة
03.531.07.11.	Fennassa Bab El Hit	2,187	11,381	0	11,381	فناسة باب الحيط
03.531.07.13.	Khlalfa	2,917	14,681	8	14,673	اخلالفة
03.531.07.15.	Mezraoua	1,611	8,317	0	8,317	مزراوة
03.531.07.17.	Rghioua	1,035	4,218	2	4,216	ارغيوة
03.531.07.19.	Tamedit	2,909	14,669	0	14,669	تمضيت
03.531.07.21.	Zrizer	1,728	7,922	0	7,922	الزريزر
03.531.09.	Cercle : Tissa	27,268	157,798	8	157,790	دائرة : تيسة
03.531.09.01.	Ain Aicha	4,361	25,417	4	25,413	عين عائشة
03.531.09.01.3.	Dont Centre: Ain Aicha	1,151	7,106	4	7,102	مركز: عين عائشة
03.531.09.03.	Ain Legdah	2,014	11,422	0	11,422	عين لكداح
03.531.09.05.	Ain Maatouf	1,854	10,104	0	10,104	عين معطوف
03.531.09.07.	Bouarouss	3,166	18,147	4	18,143	بوعروس
03.531.09.09.	El Bsabsa	1,310	8,019	0	8,019	البسابسا
03.531.09.11.	Messassa	1,642	9,501	0	9,501	مساسة
03.531.09.13.	Oued Jemaa	1,586	9,190	0	9,190	واد الجمعة
03.531.09.15.	Oulad Ayyad	1,764	9,566	0	9,566	أولاد عياد
03.531.09.17.	Oulad Daoud	2,171	11,978	0	11,978	أولاد داود
03.531.09.19.	Outabouabane	1,692	9,856	0	9,856	اوطا بوعبان
03.531.09.21.	Ras El Oued	2,657	15,778	0	15,778	رأس الواد
03.531.09.23.	Sidi M'HamedBen Lahcen	3,051	18,820	0	18,820	سيدي امحمد بن لحسن
03.561.	Province: Taza	107,408	528,419	138	528,281	إقليم: تازة
03.561.01.01.	Aknoul (Mun.)	1,038	4,403	0	4,403	اكنول (البلدية)
03.561.01.05.	Oued Amlil (Mun.)	2,154	10,405	2	10,403	واد امليل (البلدية)
03.561.01.07.	Tahla (Mun.)	6,242	27,729	6	27,723	تاهلة (البلدية)
03.561.01.11.	Taza (Mun.)	34,425	148,456	103	148,353	تازة (البلدية)
03.561.03.	Cercle : Aknoul	9,579	46,037	7	46,030	دائرة : أكنول
03.561.03.01.	Ajdir	2,204	10,214	2	10,212	أجدير
03.561.03.01.3.	Dont Centre: Ajdir	365	1,445	2	1,443	مركز: اجدير
03.561.03.03.	Bourd	1,668	8,434	0	8,434	بورد
03.561.03.05.	Gzenaya Al Janoubia	1,983	9,937	2	9,935	اكزناية الجنوبية
03.561.03.07.	Jbarna	544	2,730	0	2,730	اجبارنة
03.561.03.09.	Sidi Ali Bourakba	1,682	8,083	1	8,082	سيدي علي بورقبة
03.561.03.11.	Tizi Ouasli	1,498	6,639	2	6,637	تيزي وسلي
03.561.03.11.3.	Dont Centre: Tizi Ouasli	420	1,677	1	1,676	مركز: تيزي وسلي
03.561.07.	Cercle : Oued Amlil	16,034	90,830	4	90,826	دائرة : واد أمليل
03.561.07.01.	Bni Frassen	4,216	23,429	0	23,429	بني فراسن
03.561.07.03.	Bouchfaa	1,988	10,724	2	10,722	بوشفاعة
03.561.07.05.	Bouhlou	1,594	8,748	0	8,748	بوحلو
03.561.07.07.	Ghiata Al Gharbia	3,876	23,038	1	23,037	غياتة الغربية
03.561.07.09.	Oulad Zbair	3,189	17,747	1	17,746	أولاد ازباير
03.561.07.09.3.	Dont Centre: Oulad Zbair	1,127	5,586	1	5,585	مركز: أولاد ازباير
03.561.07.11.	Rbaa El Fouki	1,171	7,144	0	7,144	الربع الفوقي
03.561.09.	Cercle : Tahla	10,114	49,730	12	49,718	دائرة : تاهلة
03.561.09.01.	Ait Saghrouchen	3,410	16,085	3	16,082	أيت سغروشن
03.561.09.03.	Bouyablane	381	2,410	0	2,410	بويبلان
03.561.09.07.	Matmata	2,345	11,928	0	11,928	مطماطة
03.561.09.07.3.	Dont Centre: Matmata	517	2,400	0	2,400	مركز: مطماطة
03.561.09.09.	Smià	1,497	7,435	0	7,435	الصميعة
03.561.09.11.	Tazarine	467	2,623	0	2,623	تازارين
03.561.09.13.	Zrarda	2,014	9,249	9	9,240	الزراردة
03.561.09.13.3.	Dont Centre: Zrarda	966	4,188	9	4,179	مركز: الزراردة
03.561.11.	Cercle : Tainaste	12,607	66,577	3	66,574	دائرة : تيناست
03.561.11.01.	Bni Ftah	1,856	10,919	0	10,919	بني افتح
03.561.11.03.	Brarha	1,322	7,429	2	7,427	برارحة
03.561.11.05.	El Gouzate	1,221	6,575	1	6,574	الكوزات
03.561.11.07.	Kaf El Ghar	1,717	8,104	0	8,104	كاف الغار
03.561.11.09.	Msila	1,632	8,356	0	8,356	امسيلة
03.561.11.11.	Taifa	1,410	6,992	0	6,992	طايفة
03.561.11.13.	Tainaste	2,232	11,530	0	11,530	تيناست
03.561.11.13.3.	Dont Centre: Tainaste	440	1,695	0	1,695	مركز: تيناست
03.561.11.15.	Traiba	1,217	6,672	0	6,672	اترايبة
03.561.13.	Cercle : Taza	15,215	84,252	1	84,251	دائرة : تازة
03.561.13.01.	Bab Boudir	851	5,082	0	5,082	باب بودير
03.561.13.03.	Bab Marzouka	3,388	18,520	1	18,519	باب مرزوقة
03.561.13.05.	Bni Lent	2,103	11,866	0	11,866	بني لنث
03.561.13.07.	Galdamane	4,093	21,433	0	21,433	كلدمان
03.561.13.09.	Meknassa Acharqia	1,228	6,020	0	6,020	مكناسة الشرقية
03.561.13.11.	Meknassa Al Gharbia	750	3,890	0	3,890	مكناسة الغربية
03.561.13.13.	Oulad Chrif	1,393	9,237	0	9,237	أولاد الشريف
03.561.13.15.	Maghraoua	1,409	8,204	0	8,204	مغراوة
03.591.	Province: Moulay Yacoub	31,338	174,079	31	174,048	إقليم: مولاي يعقوب
03.591.01.01.	Moulay Yacoub (Mun.)	982	4,612	1	4,611	مولاي يعقوب (البلدية)
03.591.03.	Cercle : Moulay Yacoub	18,001	96,508	28	96,480	دائرة : مولاي يعقوب
03.591.03.01.	Ain Chkef	10,916	54,477	28	54,449	عين الشقف
03.591.03.01.3.	Dont Centre: Ras El Mae	4,104	20,463	8	20,455	مركز: رأس الماء
03.591.03.03.	Mikkes	995	6,089	0	6,089	ميكس
03.591.03.05.	Sebaa Rouadi	4,125	23,519	0	23,519	سبع رواضي
03.591.03.07.	Sebt Loudaya	1,965	12,423	0	12,423	سبت لوداية
03.591.05.	Cercle : Oulad Jemaa Lemta	12,355	72,959	2	72,957	دائرة : أولاد جمعة لمطة
03.591.05.01.	Ain Bou Ali	2,035	12,282	0	12,282	عين بوعلي
03.591.05.02.	Ain Kansra	2,232	12,291	0	12,291	عين قنصرة
03.591.05.03.	Laajajra	2,302	14,476	0	14,476	لعجاجرة
03.591.05.05.	Louadaine	2,035	11,767	1	11,766	الوادين
03.591.05.07.	Oulad Mimoun	1,659	9,372	0	9,372	أولاد ميمون
03.591.05.09.	Sidi Daoud	2,092	12,771	1	12,770	سيدي داود
04.	Rabat-Salé-Kénitra	1,015,107	4,580,866	20,212	4,560,654	الرباط - سلا - القنيطرة
04.281.	Province: Kénitra	214,640	1,061,435	1,815	1,059,620	إقليم: القنيطرة
04.281.01.01.	Kénitra (Mun.)	102,177	431,282	1,587	429,695	القنيطرة (البلدية)
04.281.01.05.	Mehdya (Mun.)	6,653	28,636	74	28,562	مهدية (البلدية)
04.281.01.11.	Souk El Arbaa (Mun.)	14,268	69,265	28	69,237	سوق الاربعاء (البلدية)
04.281.03.	Cercle : Kénitra-Banlieue	22,293	117,375	26	117,349	دائرة : أحواز القنيطرة
04.281.03.01.	Ameur Seflia	4,882	28,540	5	28,535	عامر السفلية
04.281.03.05.	Haddada	2,758	15,898	3	15,895	حدادة
04.281.03.11.	Ouled Slama	3,135	19,488	11	19,477	أولاد سلامة
04.281.03.13.	Sidi Taibi	11,518	53,449	7	53,442	سيدي الطيبي
04.281.03.13.3.	Dont Centre: Sidi Taîbi	10,218	46,751	5	46,746	مركز: سيدي الطيبي
04.281.05.	Cercle : Ben Mansour	20,467	128,780	9	128,771	دائرة : بنمنصور
04.281.05.03.	Ben Mansour	6,698	43,822	4	43,818	بنمنصور
04.281.05.07.	Mnasra	5,360	34,429	2	34,427	مناصرة
04.281.05.09.	Mograne	5,260	31,292	2	31,290	مكرن
04.281.05.11.	Sidi Mohamed Ben Mansour	3,149	19,237	1	19,236	سيدي محمد بنمنصور
04.281.07.	Cercle : Souk Arbaa El Gharb	13,859	77,141	3	77,138	دائرة : سوق الاربعاء الغرب
04.281.07.01.	Arbaoua	6,023	32,690	0	32,690	عرباوة
04.281.07.01.3.	Dont Centre: Arbaoua	716	3,050	0	3,050	مركز: عرباوة
04.281.07.03.	Beni Malek	4,306	26,098	2	26,096	بني مالك
04.281.07.05.	Kariat Ben Aouda	1,924	11,087	1	11,086	قرية بن عودة
04.281.07.07.	Oued El Makhazine	1,606	7,266	0	7,266	وادي المخازن
04.281.09.	Cercle : Souk Tlet El Gharb	18,367	115,106	6	115,100	دائرة : سوق ثلاثاء الغرب
04.281.09.01.	Bahhara Ouled Ayad	5,297	31,860	0	31,860	بحارة أولاد عياد
04.281.09.09.	Sidi Allal Tazi	3,098	18,055	0	18,055	سيدي علال التازي
04.281.09.09.3.	Dont Centre: Sidi Allal Tazi	904	4,870	0	4,870	مركز: سيدي علال التازي
04.281.09.13.	Sidi Mohamed Lahmar	6,358	42,637	3	42,634	سيدي محمد لحمر
04.281.09.15.	Souk Tlet El Gharb	3,614	22,554	3	22,551	سوق ثلاثاء الغرب
04.281.11.	Cercle : Lalla Mimouna	16,556	93,850	82	93,768	دائرة : للا ميمونة
04.281.11.03.	Chouafaa	3,072	18,436	2	18,434	شوافع
04.281.11.05.	Lalla Mimouna	5,309	29,479	4	29,475	للا ميمونة
04.281.11.05.3.	Dont Centre: Lalla Mimouna	3,058	15,767	0	15,767	مركز: للا ميمونة
04.281.11.07.	Moulay Bousselham	5,026	26,608	63	26,545	مولاي بوسلهام
04.281.11.07.3.	Dont Centre: Moulay Bousselham	1,693	7,372	55	7,317	مركز: مولاي بوسلهام
04.281.11.11.	Sidi Boubker El Haj	3,149	19,327	13	19,314	سيدي بوبكر الحاج
04.291.	Province: Khémisset	122,144	542,221	196	542,025	إقليم: الخميسات
04.291.01.01.	Khémisset (Mun.)	32,066	131,542	68	131,474	الخميسات (البلدية)
04.291.01.03.	Rommani (Mun.)	2,838	12,297	5	12,292	الرماني (البلدية)
04.291.01.05.	Tiflet (Mun.)	20,623	86,709	68	86,641	تيفلت (البلدية)
04.291.01.17.	Sidi Allal El Bahraoui (Mun.)	3,643	15,866	10	15,856	سيدي علال البحراوي (البلدية)
04.291.03.	Cercle : Khémisset	19,147	91,774	9	91,765	دائرة : الخميسات
04.291.03.01.	Ait Mimoune	1,791	8,486	0	8,486	أيت ميمون
04.291.03.03.	Ait Ouribel	1,956	9,640	3	9,637	أيت اوريبل
04.291.03.05.	Ait Siberne	1,073	4,900	0	4,900	أيت سيبرن
04.291.03.07.	Ait Yadine	4,206	20,502	0	20,502	أيت يدين
04.291.03.07.3.	Dont Centre: Ait Yadine	1,681	7,242	0	7,242	مركز: أيت يدين
04.291.03.09.	El Ganzra	2,374	13,209	0	13,209	الكنزرة
04.291.03.11.	Majmaa Tolba	2,795	12,609	0	12,609	مجمع الطلبة
04.291.03.13.	Sfassif	1,602	7,685	3	7,682	الصفاصيف
04.291.03.15.	Sidi Allal Lamsadder	1,651	7,366	2	7,364	سيدي علال المصدر
04.291.03.17.	Sidi El Ghandour	1,699	7,377	1	7,376	سيدي الغندور
04.291.05.	Cercle : Oulmes	14,922	61,054	4	61,050	دائرة : أولماس
04.291.05.01.	Ait Ichou	370	1,809	0	1,809	أيت ايشو
04.291.05.03.	Ait Ikkou	2,023	8,865	1	8,864	أيت إيكو
04.291.05.05.	Bouqachmir	715	3,631	0	3,631	بوقشمير
04.291.05.07.	Houderrane	1,630	6,414	1	6,413	حودران
04.291.05.09.	Maaziz	2,926	11,502	1	11,501	معازيز
04.291.05.09.3.	Dont Centre: Maaziz	2,340	8,901	1	8,900	مركز: المعازيز
04.291.05.11.	Oulmes	4,688	18,786	1	18,785	أولماس
04.291.05.11.3.	Dont Centre: Oulmes	2,955	11,145	1	11,144	مركز: اولماس
04.291.05.13.	Tiddas	2,570	10,047	0	10,047	تيداس
04.291.05.13.3.	Dont Centre: Tiddas	1,013	3,520	0	3,520	مركز: تيداس
04.291.07.	Cercle : Rommani	14,647	73,111	4	73,107	دائرة : الرماني
04.291.07.01.	Ain Sbit	2,212	11,051	0	11,051	عين السبيت
04.291.07.05.	Brachoua	2,536	12,025	0	12,025	براشوة
04.291.07.07.	Ezzhiliga	3,119	15,430	2	15,428	ازحيليكة
04.291.07.07.3.	Dont Centre: Ezzhiliga	949	3,857	0	3,857	مركز: ازحيليكة
04.291.07.09.	Jemaat Moul Blad	1,180	5,619	1	5,618	جمعة مول البلاد
04.291.07.11.	Laghoualem	2,267	12,219	0	12,219	الغوالم
04.291.07.13.	Marchouch	2,327	11,724	0	11,724	مرشوش
04.291.07.15.	Moulay Driss Aghbal	1,006	5,043	1	5,042	مولاي إدريس أغبال
04.291.09.	Cercle : Tiflet	14,258	69,868	28	69,840	دائرة : تيفلت
04.291.09.02.	Ain Johra -Sidi Boukhalkhal	3,273	17,307	9	17,298	عين جوهرة-سيدي بوخلخال
04.291.09.03.	Ait Belkacem	950	4,466	1	4,465	أيت بلقاسم
04.291.09.05.	Ait Buyahya El Hajjama	988	4,471	1	4,470	أيت بويحيى الحجامة
04.291.09.07.	Ait Malek	1,122	4,856	1	4,855	أيت مالك
04.291.09.09.	Khemis Sidi Yahya	1,458	6,673	5	6,668	خميس سيدي يحيى
04.291.09.11.	M'qam Tolba	2,533	13,503	3	13,500	مقام الطلبة
04.291.09.13.	Sidi Abderrazak	2,863	13,464	5	13,459	سيدي عبد الرزاق
04.291.09.19.	Ait Ali ou Lahcen	1,071	5,128	3	5,125	آيت علي او لحسن
04.421.	Préfecture: Rabat	151,670	577,827	12,891	564,936	عمالة: الرباط
04.421.01.01.	Agdal Riyad (Arrond.)	22,399	77,257	4,572	72,685	أكدال الرياض (المقاطعة)
04.421.01.03.	El Youssoufia (Arrond.)	42,312	170,561	2,858	167,703	اليوسفية (المقاطعة)
04.421.01.05.	Hassan (Arrond.)	32,848	108,179	2,151	106,028	حسان (المقاطعة)
04.421.01.06.	Souissi (Arrond.)	5,924	23,366	1,203	22,163	السويسي (المقاطعة)
04.421.01.07.	Touarga (Mun.)	812	3,932	8	3,924	التواركة (البلدية)
04.421.01.09.	Yacoub El Mansour (Arrond.)	47,375	194,532	2,099	192,433	يعقوب المنصور (المقاطعة)
04.441.	Préfecture: Salé	231,340	982,163	2,347	979,816	عمالة: سلا
04.441.01.03.	Bab Lamrissa (Arrond.)	44,636	174,934	668	174,266	باب المريسة (المقاطعة)
04.441.01.05.	Bettana (Arrond.)	22,360	95,291	386	94,905	بطانة (المقاطعة)
04.441.01.06.	Hssaine (Arrond.)	51,858	214,540	470	214,070	حصين (المقاطعة)
04.441.01.07.	Layayda (Arrond.)	33,522	153,361	163	153,198	العيايدة (المقاطعة)
04.441.01.08.	Sidi Bouknadel (Mun.)	4,955	25,255	9	25,246	سيدي بوقنادل (البلدية)
04.441.01.09.	Tabriquet (Arrond.)	61,101	252,277	629	251,648	تابريكت (المقاطعة)
04.441.03.	Cercle : Salé Banlieue	12,908	66,505	22	66,483	دائرة : أحواز سلا
04.441.03.01.	Shoul	3,925	19,915	6	19,909	السهول
04.441.03.05.	Ameur	8,983	46,590	16	46,574	عامر
04.481.	Province: Sidi Kacem	99,191	522,270	95	522,175	إقليم: سيدي قاسم
04.481.01.01.	Dar Gueddari (Mun.)	1,298	6,643	3	6,640	دار الكداري (البلدية)
04.481.01.03.	Had Kourt (Mun.)	1,777	7,843	1	7,842	احد كورت (البلدية)
04.481.01.05.	Jorf El Melha (Mun.)	5,888	28,681	2	28,679	جرف الملحة (البلدية)
04.481.01.07.	Mechraa Bel Ksiri (Mun.)	7,017	31,497	18	31,479	مشرع بلقصيري (البلدية)
04.481.01.11.	Sidi Kacem (Mun.)	17,923	75,672	48	75,624	سيدي قاسم (البلدية)
04.481.03.	Cercle : Tilal Al Gharb	13,650	73,602	10	73,592	دائرة : تلال الغرب
04.481.03.01.	Ain Dfali	4,836	24,241	2	24,239	عين الدفالي
04.481.03.03.	Bni Oual	1,383	7,485	0	7,485	بني وال
04.481.03.09.	Moulay Abdelkader	1,386	7,896	4	7,892	مولاي عبد القادر
04.481.03.13.	Sidi Ahmed Benaissa	1,371	7,810	0	7,810	سيدي احمد بنعيسى
04.481.03.15.	Sidi Ameur Al Hadi	2,096	11,814	0	11,814	سيدي اعمر الحاضي
04.481.03.17.	Sidi Azzouz	2,578	14,356	4	14,352	سيدي عزوز
04.481.05.	Cercle : Gharb-Bni Malek	11,654	67,722	6	67,716	دائرة : غرب بني مالك
04.481.05.01.	Al Haouafate	3,113	17,842	0	17,842	الحوافات
04.481.05.07.	Nouirate	4,460	24,805	3	24,802	انويرات
04.481.05.09.	Sefsaf	4,081	25,075	3	25,072	صفصاف
04.481.07.	Cercle : Ouargha	14,510	78,040	3	78,037	دائرة : ورغة
04.481.07.05.	Khnichet	4,682	23,707	1	23,706	الخنيشات
04.481.07.05.3.	Dont Centre: Khnichet	2,193	10,295	1	10,294	مركز: الخنيشات
04.481.07.07.	Lamrabih	3,878	20,461	2	20,459	لمرابيح
04.481.07.11.	Oulad Nouel	1,988	11,371	0	11,371	اولاد نوال
04.481.07.19.	Sidi M'Hamed Chelh	1,373	7,737	0	7,737	سيدي امحمد الشلح
04.481.07.21.	Taoughilt	2,589	14,764	0	14,764	توغيلت
04.481.09.	Cercle : Chrarda	13,011	73,383	3	73,380	دائرة : الشراردة
04.481.09.01.	Bab Tiouka	1,282	7,697	0	7,697	باب تيوكا
04.481.09.03.	Bir Taleb	2,047	11,370	1	11,369	بير الطالب
04.481.09.05.	Chbanate	1,949	10,371	0	10,371	اشبانات
04.481.09.07.	Selfat	1,570	10,239	0	10,239	سلفات
04.481.09.09.	Tekna	1,131	7,068	0	7,068	ثكنة
04.481.09.11.	Zaggota	1,729	10,032	0	10,032	زكوطة
04.481.09.13.	Zirara	3,303	16,606	2	16,604	زيرارة
04.481.09.13.3.	Dont Centre: Zirara	1,673	8,000	0	8,000	مركز: زيرارة
04.481.11.	Cercle : Baht	12,463	79,187	1	79,186	دائرة : بهت
04.481.11.03.	Dar Laaslouji	5,068	32,127	1	32,126	دار العسلوجي
04.481.11.05.	Rmilat	2,569	16,861	0	16,861	ارميلات
04.481.11.11.	Sidi Al Kamel	4,826	30,199	0	30,199	سيدي الكامل
04.491.	Province: Sidi Slimane	60,922	320,407	92	320,315	إقليم: سيدي سليمان
04.491.01.07.	Sidi Slimane (Mun.)	20,725	92,989	62	92,927	سيدي سليمان (البلدية)
04.491.01.09.	Sidi Yahya El Gharb (Mun.)	7,498	37,979	14	37,965	سيدي يحيى الغرب (البلدية)
04.491.03.	Cercle : Kceibya	10,683	67,903	4	67,899	دائرة : قصيبية
04.491.03.07.	Kceibya	4,296	27,059	3	27,056	قصيبية
04.491.03.15.	Sfafaa	3,583	21,475	1	21,474	الصفافعة
04.491.03.17.	Ameur Chamalia	2,804	19,369	0	19,369	عامر الشمالية
04.491.05.	Cercle : Sidi slimane	22,016	121,536	12	121,524	دائرة : سيدي سليمان
04.491.05.01.	Azghar	1,864	10,850	2	10,848	ازغار
04.491.05.03.	Boumaiz	3,815	19,684	3	19,681	بومعيز
04.491.05.05.	Dar Bel Amri	5,171	28,156	2	28,154	دار بلعامري
04.491.05.09.	M'saada	3,425	19,853	2	19,851	مساعدة
04.491.05.11.	Ouled Ben Hammadi	2,297	12,778	0	12,778	أولاد بن حمادي
04.491.05.13.	Ouled H'Cine	5,444	30,215	3	30,212	أولاد حسين
04.501.	Préfecture: Skhirate- Témara	135,200	574,543	2,776	571,767	عمالة: الصخيرات - تمارة
04.501.01.01.	Ain El Aouda (Mun.)	11,063	49,816	44	49,772	عين العودة (البلدية)
04.501.01.03.	Harhoura (Mun.)	4,398	15,361	615	14,746	الهرهورة (البلدية)
04.501.01.05.	Skhirate (Mun.)	13,623	59,775	177	59,598	الصخيرات (البلدية)
04.501.01.07.	Témara (Mun.)	75,440	313,510	1,264	312,246	تمارة (البلدية)
04.501.01.09.	Ain Attig (Mun.)	5,396	25,078	51	25,027	عين عتيق (البلدية)
04.501.03.	Cercle : Ain El Aouda	17,872	75,357	600	74,757	دائرة : عين العودة
04.501.03.01.	El Menzeh	2,719	11,370	58	11,312	المنزه
04.501.03.03.	Oumazza	1,433	6,197	167	6,030	أم عزة
04.501.03.11.	Sidi Yahya Zaer	13,720	57,790	375	57,415	سيدي يحيى زعير
04.501.03.11.3.	Dont Centre: Sidi Yahya Zaer	2,285	10,006	9	9,997	مركز: سيدي يحيى زعير
04.501.03.11.4.	Dont Centre: Tamesna	7,359	28,119	354	27,765	مركز: تامسنا
04.501.05.	Cercle : Témara	7,408	35,646	25	35,621	دائرة : تمارة
04.501.05.03.	Mers El Kheir	4,380	20,617	11	20,606	مرس الخير
04.501.05.03.3.	Dont Centre: Mers El Kheir	3,399	15,891	5	15,886	مركز: مرس الخير
04.501.05.05.	Sabbah	3,028	15,029	14	15,015	صباح
05.	Béni Mellal-Khénifra	520,174	2,520,776	1,262	2,519,514	بني ملال - خنيفرة
05.081.	Province: Azilal	97,346	554,001	106	553,895	إقليم: أزيلال
05.081.01.01.	Azilal (Mun.)	8,438	38,520	11	38,509	أزيلال (البلدية)
05.081.01.03.	Demnate (Mun.)	6,239	29,504	12	29,492	دمنات (البلدية)
05.081.03.	Cercle : Azilal	13,981	96,718	10	96,708	دائرة : أزيلال
05.081.03.01.	Agoudi N'Lkhair	1,787	11,752	0	11,752	اكودي نلخير
05.081.03.03.	Ait Abbas	1,695	12,633	0	12,633	أيت عباس
05.081.03.05.	Ait Bou Oulli	1,390	11,095	0	11,095	أيت بوعلي
05.081.03.07.	Ait M'Hamed	3,493	23,696	1	23,695	أيت امحمد
05.081.03.09.	Tabant	2,194	14,963	9	14,954	تبانت
05.081.03.11.	Tamda Noumercid	1,807	11,922	0	11,922	تامدا نومرسيد
05.081.03.13.	Zaouiat Ahansal	1,615	10,657	0	10,657	زاوية احنصال
05.081.05.	Cercle : Bzou	19,031	104,026	26	104,000	دائرة : بزو
05.081.05.01.	Ait Taguella	1,496	8,268	18	8,250	أيت تكلا
05.081.05.05.	Bni Hassane	2,028	12,077	0	12,077	بني حسن
05.081.05.07.	Bzou	3,092	14,072	2	14,070	بزو
05.081.05.07.3.	Dont Centre: Bzou	1,081	4,202	2	4,200	مركز: بزو
05.081.05.09.	Foum Jemaa	2,033	9,873	0	9,873	فم الجمعة
05.081.05.09.3.	Dont Centre: Foum Jemaa	1,239	5,824	0	5,824	مركز: فم الجمعة
05.081.05.11.	Moulay Aissa Ben Driss	2,440	13,797	0	13,797	مولاي عيسى بن إدريس
05.081.05.13.	Rfala	1,660	9,749	2	9,747	ارفالة
05.081.05.15.	Tabia	1,386	7,849	0	7,849	تابية
05.081.05.17.	Tanant	2,008	10,706	1	10,705	تنانت
05.081.05.19.	Taounza	1,859	11,488	2	11,486	تاونزا
05.081.05.21.	Tisqi	1,029	6,147	1	6,146	تسقي
05.081.09.	Cercle : Ouaouizeght	12,443	64,159	27	64,132	دائرة : واويزغت
05.081.09.03.	Ait Mazigh	576	3,330	0	3,330	أيت مزيغ
05.081.09.07.	Ait Ouqabli	674	3,298	0	3,298	أيت اوقبلي
05.081.09.09.	Anergui	636	3,570	0	3,570	انركي
05.081.09.11.	Bin El Ouidane	994	5,421	7	5,414	بين الويدان
05.081.09.13.	Isseksi	310	1,674	13	1,661	اسكسي
05.081.09.15.	Ouaouizeght	3,261	14,570	7	14,563	واويزغت
05.081.09.15.3.	Dont Centre: Ouaouizeght	2,250	9,449	6	9,443	مركز: واويزغت
05.081.09.17.	Tabaroucht	665	3,830	0	3,830	تبروشت
05.081.09.19.	Tagleft	2,766	14,423	0	14,423	تاكلفت
05.081.09.21.	Tiffert N'Ait Hamza	671	3,499	0	3,499	تيفرت نايت حمزة
05.081.09.23.	Tilougguite	1,890	10,544	0	10,544	تيلوكيت
05.081.11.	Cercle : Afourar	10,660	52,542	11	52,531	دائرة : افورار
05.081.11.01.	Afourar	4,627	21,382	7	21,375	افورار
05.081.11.01.3.	Dont Centre: Afourar	3,056	13,185	6	13,179	مركز: أفورار
05.081.11.03.	Bni Ayat	4,314	22,900	1	22,899	بني عياط
05.081.11.05.	Ait Ouaarda	275	1,644	0	1,644	أيت واوردا
05.081.11.25.	Timoulilt	1,444	6,616	3	6,613	تيموليلت
05.081.13.	Cercle : Fetouqka	12,466	80,580	0	80,580	دائرة : فتواكة
05.081.13.05.	Ait Oumdis	2,204	15,408	0	15,408	أيت أو مديس
05.081.13.07.	Ait Tamlil	2,798	19,930	0	19,930	أيت تمليل
05.081.13.09.	Anzou	2,562	15,429	0	15,429	انزو
05.081.13.17.	Sidi Yacoub	2,721	17,054	0	17,054	سيدي يعقوب
05.081.13.19.	Tidili Fetouaka	2,181	12,759	0	12,759	تدلي فطواكة
05.081.15.	Cercle : Oultana	14,088	87,952	9	87,943	دائرة : ولتانة
05.081.15.01.	Ait Blal	1,082	7,770	0	7,770	أيت بلال
05.081.15.03.	Ait Majden	2,991	17,572	1	17,571	أيت ماجدن
05.081.15.11.	Imlil	2,035	10,435	3	10,432	امليل
05.081.15.13.	Ouaoula	3,814	24,790	0	24,790	واولى
05.081.15.15.	Sidi Boulkhalf	2,179	15,625	5	15,620	سيدي بوخالف
05.081.15.21.	Tifni	1,987	11,760	0	11,760	تفني
05.091.	Province: Béni Mellal	123,067	550,678	464	550,214	إقليم: بني ملال
05.091.01.01.	Béni Mellal (Mun.)	45,529	192,676	314	192,362	بني ملال (البلدية)
05.091.01.03.	El Ksiba (Mun.)	5,391	20,001	15	19,986	القصيبة (البلدية)
05.091.01.07.	Kasba Tadla (Mun.)	11,488	47,343	77	47,266	قصبة تادلة (البلدية)
05.091.01.13.	Zaouiat Cheikh (Mun.)	6,614	25,388	5	25,383	زاوية الشيخ (البلدية)
05.091.03.	Cercle : Béni Mellal	22,161	111,047	30	111,017	دائرة : بني ملال
05.091.03.01.	Foum Oudi	2,508	12,233	4	12,229	فم اودي
05.091.03.03.	Ouled Gnaou	2,460	12,720	0	12,720	أولاد كناو
05.091.03.05.	Ouled M'Barek	4,116	19,774	3	19,771	أولاد امبارك
05.091.03.05.3.	Dont Centre: Oulad M'Barek	2,348	10,843	2	10,841	مركز: اولاد امبارك
05.091.03.07.	Ouled Yaich	5,404	27,476	13	27,463	أولاد ايعيش
05.091.03.07.3.	Dont Centre: Oulad Yaich	2,068	9,671	3	9,668	مركز: اولاد ايعيش
05.091.03.09.	Sidi Jaber	3,790	20,432	8	20,424	سيدي جابر
05.091.03.09.3.	Dont Centre: Sidi Jaber	1,017	4,671	2	4,669	مركز: سيدي جابر
05.091.03.11.	Foum El Anceur	3,883	18,412	2	18,410	فم العنصر
05.091.05.	Cercle : Aghbala	6,574	32,090	7	32,083	دائرة : أغبالة
05.091.05.01.	Aghbala	2,945	12,781	1	12,780	اغبالة
05.091.05.01.3.	Dont Centre: Aghbala	1,776	6,745	1	6,744	مركز: اغبالة
05.091.05.05.	Boutferda	1,247	7,391	0	7,391	بوتفردة
05.091.05.17.	Tizi N'Isly	2,382	11,918	6	11,912	تيزي نيسلي
05.091.07.	Cercle : El Ksiba	15,164	69,771	8	69,763	دائرة : القصيبة
05.091.07.03.	Ait Oum El Bekht	1,729	8,198	0	8,198	أيت أم البخث
05.091.07.07.	Dir El Ksiba	4,949	22,855	1	22,854	دير القصيبة
05.091.07.07.3.	Dont Centre: Ighram Laalam	1,888	8,670	0	8,670	مركز: إغرم لعلام
05.091.07.11.	Naour	1,243	5,999	0	5,999	ناوور
05.091.07.13.	Taghzirt	4,495	19,936	5	19,931	تاكزيرت
05.091.07.15.	Tanougha	2,748	12,783	2	12,781	تانوغة
05.091.11.	Cercle : Kasba Tadla	10,146	52,362	8	52,354	دائرة : قصبة تادلة
05.091.11.01.	Guettaya	2,854	14,425	1	14,424	كطاية
05.091.11.03.	Ouled Youssef	2,663	14,596	6	14,590	أولاد يوسف
05.091.11.05.	Ouled Said L'Oued	2,833	14,351	0	14,351	أولاد سعيد الواد
05.091.11.07.	Semguet	1,796	8,990	1	8,989	سمكت
05.255.	Province: Fquih Ben Salah	96,062	502,827	159	502,668	إقليم: الفقيه بن صالح
05.255.01.05.	Fquih Ben Salah (Mun.)	22,584	102,019	73	101,946	الفقيه بن صالح (البلدية)
05.255.01.09.	Ouled Ayad (Mun.)	4,831	23,818	4	23,814	أولاد عياد (البلدية)
05.255.01.11.	Souk Sebt Ouled Nemma (Mun.)	12,145	60,076	22	60,054	سوق السبت أولاد النمة (البلدية)
05.255.05.	Cercle : Bni Moussa Charquia	15,960	88,555	23	88,532	دائرة : ا بني موسى لشرقية
05.255.05.05.	Ouled Bourahmoune	2,620	15,113	1	15,112	أولاد بورحمون
05.255.05.09.	Ouled Zmam	5,882	33,652	16	33,636	أولاد زمام
05.255.05.11.	Sidi Aissa Ben Ali	4,675	25,563	6	25,557	سيدي عيسى بن علي
05.255.05.13.	Sidi Hammadi	2,783	14,227	0	14,227	سيدي حمادي
05.255.09.	Cercle : Fqih Ben Salah	23,333	124,079	20	124,059	دائرة : الفقيه بن صالح
05.255.09.01.	Khalfia	2,926	15,451	0	15,451	الخالفية
05.255.09.03.	Bni Chegdale	2,145	11,444	0	11,444	بني شكدال
05.255.09.05.	Bni Oukil	2,763	15,260	8	15,252	بني وكيل
05.255.09.07.	Bradia	7,662	40,685	5	40,680	برادية
05.255.09.07.3.	Dont Centre: Bradia	1,805	8,316	5	8,311	مركز: برادية
05.255.09.09.	Hel Merbaa	2,290	12,025	4	12,021	اهل مربع
05.255.09.11.	Krifate	5,547	29,214	3	29,211	كريفات
05.255.11.	Cercle : Bni Moussa Gharbia	17,209	104,280	17	104,263	دائرة : ا بني موسى الغربية
05.255.11.01.	Dar Ould Zidouh	5,508	31,170	4	31,166	دار ولد زيدوح
05.255.11.01.3.	Dont Centre: Dar Ould Zidouh	2,350	11,491	0	11,491	مركز: دار ولد زيدوح
05.255.11.03.	Had Boumoussa	7,147	44,672	12	44,660	أحد بوموسى
05.255.11.07.	Ouled Nacer	4,554	28,438	1	28,437	أولاد ناصر
05.301.	Province: Khénifra	87,573	371,145	116	371,029	إقليم: خنيفرة
05.301.01.01.	Khenifra (Mun.)	29,281	117,510	67	117,443	خنيفرة (البلدية)
05.301.01.05.	M'Rirt (Mun.)	11,012	42,730	12	42,718	مريرت (البلدية)
05.301.03.	Cercle : El Kbab	17,587	75,955	19	75,936	دائرة : القباب
05.301.03.01.	Ait Ishaq	4,612	19,133	0	19,133	أيت اسحاق
05.301.03.01.3.	Dont Centre: Ait Ishaq	3,227	12,179	0	12,179	مركز: آيت إسحاق
05.301.03.03.	Ait Saadelli	521	2,540	0	2,540	أيت سعدلي
05.301.03.05.	El Kbab	3,695	16,157	12	16,145	القباب
05.301.03.05.3.	Dont Centre: El Kbab	2,194	8,345	12	8,333	مركز: القباب
05.301.03.07.	Kerrouchen	1,493	7,021	0	7,021	كروشن
05.301.03.07.3.	Dont Centre: Kerrouchen	537	2,053	0	2,053	مركز: كروشن
05.301.03.09.	Ouaoumana	2,108	8,849	0	8,849	واو مانة
05.301.03.09.3.	Dont Centre: Ouaoumana	1,443	5,496	0	5,496	مركز: واو مانة
05.301.03.11.	Sidi Yahya Ou Saad	1,454	7,051	0	7,051	سيدي يحيى أو ساعد
05.301.03.13.	Tighassaline	3,704	15,204	7	15,197	تيغسالين
05.301.03.13.3.	Dont Centre: Tighassaline	2,377	8,810	7	8,803	مركز: تيغسالين
05.301.05.	Cercle : Khénifra	10,512	48,850	6	48,844	دائرة : خنيفرة
05.301.05.01.	Aguelmam Azegza	1,611	7,684	2	7,682	اكلمام ازكزا
05.301.05.05.	El Borj	819	3,812	3	3,809	البرج
05.301.05.11.	Lehri	1,880	9,085	1	9,084	لهري
05.301.05.13.	Moha Ou Hammou Zayani	2,100	9,286	0	9,286	موحى أوحمو الزياني
05.301.05.21.	Sidi Amar	445	2,175	0	2,175	سيدي عمار
05.301.05.25.	Sidi Lamine	3,657	16,808	0	16,808	سيدي لامين
05.301.05.25.3.	Dont Centre: Kahf Nssar	1,763	7,163	0	7,163	مركز: كهف النسور
05.301.07.	Cercle : Aguelmous	19,181	86,100	12	86,088	دائرة : اكلموس
05.301.07.03.	Aguelmous	8,064	35,626	7	35,619	اكلموس
05.301.07.03.3.	Dont Centre: Aguelmous	3,603	14,177	2	14,175	مركز: أكلموس
05.301.07.07.	El Hammam	2,837	12,830	1	12,829	الحمام
05.301.07.07.3.	Dont Centre: Thighza	448	1,786	0	1,786	مركز: تيغزة
05.301.07.09.	Had Bouhssoussen	1,660	7,368	1	7,367	أحد بوحسوسن
05.301.07.09.3.	Dont Centre: Had Bouhssoussen	772	3,049	1	3,048	مركز: احد بوحسوسن
05.301.07.15.	Moulay Bouazza	2,054	8,490	1	8,489	مولاي بوعزة
05.301.07.15.3.	Dont Centre: Moulay Bouazza	1,434	5,269	1	5,268	مركز: مولاي بوعزة
05.301.07.17.	Oum Rabia	1,990	9,555	0	9,555	أم الربيع
05.301.07.19.	Sebt Ait Rahou	1,971	9,245	2	9,243	سبت ايت رحو
05.301.07.23.	Sidi Hcine	605	2,986	0	2,986	سيدي حسين
05.311.	Province: Khouribga	116,126	542,125	417	541,708	إقليم: خريبكة
05.311.01.01.	Bejaad (Mun.)	11,091	46,893	40	46,853	ابي الجعد (البلدية)
05.311.01.03.	Boujniba (Mun.)	3,572	16,030	2	16,028	بوجنيبة (البلدية)
05.311.01.05.	Hattane (Mun.)	2,364	10,618	0	10,618	حطان (البلدية)
05.311.01.07.	Khouribga (Mun.)	43,487	196,196	294	195,902	خريبكة (البلدية)
05.311.01.09.	Oued Zem (Mun.)	21,724	95,267	59	95,208	وادي زم (البلدية)
05.311.03.	Cercle : Bejaad	7,392	39,216	0	39,216	دائرة : ابي الجعد
05.311.03.01.	Ain Kaicher	935	4,609	0	4,609	عين قيشر
05.311.03.03.	Bni Bataou	895	5,113	0	5,113	بني بتاو
05.311.03.05.	Bni Zrantel	1,285	6,597	0	6,597	بني زرنتل
05.311.03.07.	Boukhrisse	974	5,204	0	5,204	بوخريص
05.311.03.09.	Chougrane	1,260	6,864	0	6,864	شكران
05.311.03.11.	Oulad Gouaouch	577	2,709	0	2,709	أولاد كواوش
05.311.03.13.	Rouached	737	4,484	0	4,484	الرواشد
05.311.03.15.	Tachraft	729	3,636	0	3,636	تشرافت
05.311.05.	Cercle : Khouribga	14,566	72,628	20	72,608	دائرة : خريبكة
05.311.05.01.	Bir Mezoui	1,275	6,131	0	6,131	بئر مزوي
05.311.05.03.	Bni Ykhlef	1,828	9,992	1	9,991	بني يخلف
05.311.05.05.	Bulanouare	3,475	16,041	5	16,036	بولنوار
05.311.05.05.3.	Dont Centre: Boulanouare	2,802	12,756	5	12,751	مركز: بولنوار
05.311.05.07.	Lagfaf	1,772	8,510	2	8,508	لكفاف
05.311.05.09.	El Foqra	599	3,154	0	3,154	الفقراء
05.311.05.11.	M'Fassis	1,144	5,411	2	5,409	مفاسيس
05.311.05.13.	Oulad Abdoune	2,719	13,574	10	13,564	أولاد عبدون
05.311.05.15.	Oulad Azzouz	1,754	9,815	0	9,815	أولاد عزوز
05.311.07.	Cercle : Oued-Zem	11,930	65,277	2	65,275	دائرة : واد زم
05.311.07.01.	Ait Ammar	834	4,260	0	4,260	أيت عمار
05.311.07.03.	Bni Smir	1,067	6,241	0	6,241	بني سمير
05.311.07.05.	Braksa	1,386	7,435	0	7,435	لبراكسة
05.311.07.07.	Kasbat Troch	1,624	9,194	0	9,194	قصبة الطرش
05.311.07.09.	Lagnadiz	1,297	7,227	0	7,227	لكناديز
05.311.07.11.	Maadna	1,150	6,227	0	6,227	لمعادنة
05.311.07.13.	Oulad Aissa	1,024	5,845	0	5,845	اولاد عيسى
05.311.07.15.	Oulad Boughadi	1,643	8,648	1	8,647	أولاد بوغادي
05.311.07.17.	Oulad Fennane	1,415	7,575	0	7,575	أولاد فنان
05.311.07.19.	Oulad Ftata	490	2,625	1	2,624	أولاد فتاتة
06.	Grand Casablanca-Settat	1,559,404	6,861,739	31,239	6,830,500	الدار البيضاء الكبرى - سطات
06.111.	Province: Benslimane	49,108	233,123	478	232,645	إقليم: بنسليمان
06.111.01.01.	Benslimane (Mun.)	13,092	57,101	66	57,035	بنسليمان (البلدية)
06.111.01.03.	Bouznika (Mun.)	8,488	37,238	105	37,133	بوزنيقة (البلدية)
06.111.01.05.	El Mansouria (Mun.)	4,842	19,853	266	19,587	المنصورية (البلدية)
06.111.03.	Cercle : Benslimane	18,557	97,395	27	97,368	دائرة : بنسليمان
06.111.03.01.	Ahlaf	2,244	11,451	1	11,450	احلاف
06.111.03.03.	Ain Tizgha	2,755	15,692	3	15,689	عين تيزغة
06.111.03.05.	Fdalate	2,541	11,966	2	11,964	فضالات
06.111.03.07.	Mellila	2,803	15,081	2	15,079	مليلة
06.111.03.11.	Moualine El Oued	1,829	9,129	3	9,126	موالين الواد
06.111.03.13.	Oulad Ali Toualaa	1,023	5,504	1	5,503	اولاد علي الطوالع
06.111.03.15.	Oulad Yahya Louta	1,833	9,430	1	9,429	اولاد يحيى لوطا
06.111.03.17.	Rdadna Oulad Malek	951	4,561	4	4,557	الردادنة أولاد مالك
06.111.03.19.	Ziaida	2,578	14,581	10	14,571	زيايدة
06.111.05.	Cercle : Bouznika	4,129	21,536	14	21,522	دائرة : بوزنيقة
06.111.05.01.	Bir Ennasr	830	4,855	0	4,855	بئر النصر
06.111.05.04.	Sidi Bettache	1,443	6,927	1	6,926	سيدي بطاش
06.111.05.05.	Charrate	1,856	9,754	13	9,741	الشراط
06.117.	Province: Berrechid	103,803	484,518	499	484,019	إقليم: برشيد
06.117.01.03.	Berrechid (Mun.)	31,705	136,634	205	136,429	برشيد (البلدية)
06.117.01.05.	Deroua (Mun.)	10,596	47,719	89	47,630	الدروة (البلدية)
06.117.01.07.	El Gara (Mun.)	4,833	20,855	9	20,846	الكارة (البلدية)
06.117.01.09.	Had Soualem (Mun.)	8,454	36,765	25	36,740	حد السوالم (البلدية)
06.117.01.11.	Oulad Abbou (Mun.)	2,277	11,299	6	11,293	اولاد عبو (البلدية)
06.117.01.13.	Sidi Rahal Chatai (Mun.)	4,919	20,628	23	20,605	سيدي رحال الشاطئ (البلدية)
06.117.05.	Cercle : Berrechid	26,121	131,084	65	131,019	دائرة : برشيد
06.117.05.01.	Ben Maachou	1,676	8,458	1	8,457	ابن معاشو
06.117.05.11.	Laghnimyine	2,978	17,513	1	17,512	لغنيميين
06.117.05.13.	Lahsasna	1,693	9,315	4	9,311	لحساسنة
06.117.05.25.	Sahel Oulad H'Riz	7,250	38,156	32	38,124	الساحل اولاد احريز
06.117.05.27.	Sidi Abdelkhaleq	1,007	6,122	0	6,122	سيدي عبد الخالق
06.117.05.29.	Sidi El Mekki	1,711	8,920	9	8,911	سيدي المكي
06.117.05.33.	Soualem Trifiya	7,970	33,079	18	33,061	السوالم-الطريفية
06.117.05.35.	Zaouiat Sidi Ben Hamdoun	1,836	9,521	0	9,521	زاوية سيدي بنحمدون
06.117.08.	Cercle : El Gara	14,898	79,534	77	79,457	دائرة : الكارة
06.117.08.05.	Foqra Oulad Aameur	1,223	6,256	0	6,256	الفقراء أولاد عامر
06.117.08.07.	Jaqma	1,850	10,306	25	10,281	جاقمة
06.117.08.09.	Kasbat Ben Mchich	2,603	14,905	0	14,905	قصبة بن مشيش
06.117.08.17.	Lambarkiyine	1,604	8,559	1	8,558	لمباركيين
06.117.08.19.	Ouled Cebbah	1,524	7,606	1	7,605	أولاد صباح
06.117.08.20.	Oulad Ziyane	3,306	17,095	1	17,094	اولاد زيان
06.117.08.21.	Ouled Zidane	1,297	6,434	1	6,433	أولاد زيدان
06.117.08.23.	Riah	1,491	8,373	48	8,325	رياح
06.141.	Préfecture: Casablanca	819,954	3,359,818	24,337	3,335,481	عمالة: الدار البيضاء
06.141.01.0.	Préfecture d’Arrondissements Casablanca Anfa	130,542	454,908	12,129	442,779	عمالة مقاطعات الدار البيضاء أنفا
06.141.01.01.	Anfa (Arrond.)	26,009	94,504	3,149	91,355	أنفا (المقاطعة)
06.141.01.03.	El Maarif (Arrond.)	50,253	170,689	5,043	165,646	المعاريف (المقاطعة)
06.141.01.07.	Sidi Belyout (Arrond.)	54,280	189,715	3,937	185,778	سيدي بليوط (المقاطعة)
06.141.01.1.	Préfecture d’Arrondissements Al Fida-Mers Sultan	72,701	288,426	1,148	287,278	عمالة مقاطعات الفداء مرس السلطان
06.141.01.11.	Al-Fida (Arrond.)	38,625	158,667	124	158,543	الفداء (المقاطعة)
06.141.01.13.	Mers-Sultan (Arrond.)	34,076	129,759	1,024	128,735	مرس السلطان (المقاطعة)
06.141.01.2.	Préfecture d’Arrondissements Aïn Sebaâ-Hay Mohammadi	103,516	425,916	2,635	423,281	عمالة مقاطعات عين السبع الحي المحمدي
06.141.01.21.	Aîn-Sebaâ (Arrond.)	40,197	171,452	1,227	170,225	عين السبع (المقاطعة)
06.141.01.23.	Assoukhour Assawda (Arrond.)	30,041	115,704	1,253	114,451	الصخور السوداء (المقاطعة)
06.141.01.25.	Hay Mohammadi (Arrond.)	33,278	138,760	155	138,605	الحي المحمدي (المقاطعة)
06.141.01.3.	Préfecture d’Arrondissement Hay Hassani	118,700	468,542	5,300	463,242	عمالة مقاطعة الحي الحسني
06.141.01.31.	Hay-Hassani (Arrond.)	118,700	468,542	5,300	463,242	الحي الحسني (المقاطعة)
06.141.01.4.	Préfecture d’Arrondissement Aïn Chock	89,013	377,744	2,043	375,701	عمالة مقاطعة عين الشق
06.141.01.41.	Aîn-Chock (Arrond.)	89,013	377,744	2,043	375,701	عين الشق (المقاطعة)
06.141.01.5.	Préfecture d’Arrondissements Sidi Bernoussi	144,598	627,968	588	627,380	عمالة مقاطعات سيدي البرنوصي
06.141.01.51.	Sidi Bernoussi (Arrond.)	41,288	173,189	238	172,951	سيدي البرنوصي (المقاطعة)
06.141.01.53.	Sidi Moumen (Arrond.)	103,310	454,779	350	454,429	سيدي مومن (المقاطعة)
06.141.01.6.	Préfecture d’Arrondissements Ben M’sick	56,729	248,138	168	247,970	عمالة مقاطعات ابن مسيك
06.141.01.61.	Ben M'Sick (Arrond.)	30,519	131,883	88	131,795	ابن امسيك (المقاطعة)
06.141.01.63.	Sbata (Arrond.)	26,210	116,255	80	116,175	سباتة (المقاطعة)
06.141.01.7.	Préfecture d’Arrondissements Moulay Rachid	103,510	465,531	302	465,229	عمالة مقاطعات مولاي رشيد
06.141.01.71.	Moulay Rachid (Arrond.)	54,286	245,484	188	245,296	مولاي رشيد (المقاطعة)
06.141.01.73.	Sidi Othmane (Arrond.)	49,224	220,047	114	219,933	سيدي عثمان (المقاطعة)
06.141.01.81.	Mechouar de Casablanca (Mun.)	645	2,645	24	2,621	المشور الدار البيضاء (البلدية)
06.181.	Province: El Jadida	167,602	786,716	1,402	785,314	إقليم: الجديدة
06.181.01.01.	Azemmour (Mun.)	9,865	40,920	55	40,865	أزمور (البلدية)
06.181.01.03.	El Jadida (Mun.)	49,160	194,934	999	193,935	الجديدة (البلدية)
06.181.01.05.	Lbir Jdid (Mun.)	5,337	24,136	51	24,085	لبير الجديد (البلدية)
06.181.03.	Cercle : Azemmour	19,919	106,091	21	106,070	دائرة : أزمور
06.181.03.01.	Chtouka	5,764	33,170	2	33,168	شتوكة
06.181.03.05.	Laghdira	3,766	19,973	4	19,969	لغديرة
06.181.03.07.	Lamharza Essahel	3,341	17,766	3	17,763	لمهارزة الساحل
06.181.03.11.	Sidi Ali Ben Hamdouche	7,048	35,182	12	35,170	سيدي علي بن حمدوش
06.181.03.11.3.	Dont Centre: Sidi Ali Ben Hamdouche	1,954	8,666	1	8,665	مركز: سيدي علي بن حمدوش
06.181.05.	Cercle : El Jadida	38,128	188,743	224	188,519	دائرة : الجديدة
06.181.05.01.	My Abdellah	17,596	74,671	205	74,466	مولاي عبد الله
06.181.05.01.3.	Dont Centre: Moulay Abdellah	2,975	12,456	26	12,430	مركز: مولاي عبد الله
06.181.05.01.4.	Dont Centre: Oulad Ghadbane	1,399	6,152	9	6,143	مركز: اولاد غضبان
06.181.05.01.5.	Dont Centre: Sidi Bouzid	1,588	6,174	162	6,012	مركز: سيدي بوزيد
06.181.05.03.	Oulad Aissa	4,051	23,370	6	23,364	أولاد عيسى
06.181.05.05.	Ouled Ghanem	4,215	24,775	0	24,775	أولاد غانم
06.181.05.07.	Ouled Hcine	5,749	32,130	11	32,119	أولاد احسين
06.181.05.09.	Sidi Abed	4,536	22,980	2	22,978	سيدي عابد
06.181.05.11.	Sidi M'Hamed Akhdim	1,981	10,817	0	10,817	سيدي امحمد اخديم
06.181.07.	Cercle : Haouzia	11,132	57,270	28	57,242	دائرة : حوزية
06.181.07.03.	Haouzia	5,684	28,821	23	28,798	حوزية
06.181.07.09.	Oulad Rahmoune	5,448	28,449	5	28,444	أولاد رحمون
06.181.09.	Cercle : Sidi Smail	34,061	174,622	24	174,598	دائرة : سيدي اسماعيل
06.181.09.01.	Boulaouane	2,745	14,485	0	14,485	بولعوان
06.181.09.03.	Chaibate	1,954	9,877	1	9,876	شعيبات
06.181.09.05.	Mettouh	4,958	25,856	1	25,855	متوح
06.181.09.07.	Mogress	2,811	15,705	0	15,705	مكرس
06.181.09.09.	Oulad Hamdane	2,246	11,577	1	11,576	أولاد حمدان
06.181.09.11.	Oulad Sidi Ali Ben Youssef	1,798	10,032	1	10,031	أولاد سيدي علي بن يوسف
06.181.09.13.	Ouled Frej	4,350	19,752	9	19,743	أولاد فرج
06.181.09.13.3.	Dont Centre: Oulad Frej	3,095	13,272	8	13,264	مركز: اولاد فرج
06.181.09.15.	Sebt Saiss	2,044	10,488	0	10,488	سبت سايس
06.181.09.17.	Si Hsaien Ben Abderrahmane	1,196	5,990	2	5,988	سي احساين بن عبد الرحمان
06.181.09.19.	Sidi Smail	5,861	28,733	7	28,726	سيدي اسماعيل
06.181.09.19.3.	Dont Centre: Sidi Smail	1,354	5,565	7	5,558	مركز: سيدي اسماعيل
06.181.09.21.	Zaouiat Saiss	1,971	11,160	2	11,158	زاوية سايس
06.181.09.23.	Zaouiat Lakouacem	2,127	10,967	0	10,967	زاوية لقواسم
06.355.	Province: Médiouna	39,560	172,680	154	172,526	إقليم: مديونة
06.355.01.01.	Lahraouyine (Mun.)	15,160	64,821	32	64,789	الهراويين (البلدية)
06.355.01.03.	Mediouna (Mun.)	5,042	22,442	20	22,422	مديونة (البلدية)
06.355.01.05.	Tit Mellil (Mun.)	7,187	32,782	51	32,731	تيط مليل (البلدية)
06.355.03.	Cercle : Tit Mellil	12,171	52,635	51	52,584	دائرة : تيط مليل
06.355.03.01.	Al Majjatia Oulad Taleb	7,544	32,286	23	32,263	المجاطية أولاد الطالب
06.355.03.05.	Sidi Hajjaj Oued Hassar	4,627	20,349	28	20,321	سيدي حجاج واد حصار
06.371.	Préfecture: Mohammadia	96,351	404,648	2,594	402,054	عمالة: المحمدية
06.371.01.01.	Mohammadia (Mun.)	49,974	208,612	2,424	206,188	المحمدية (البلدية)
06.371.01.03.	Ain Harrouda (Mun.)	15,143	62,420	57	62,363	عين حرودة (البلدية)
06.371.03.	Cercle : Znata	31,234	133,616	113	133,503	دائرة : زناتة
06.371.03.01.	Bni Yakhlef	10,827	48,338	38	48,300	بني يخلف
06.371.03.01.3.	Dont Centre: Bni Yakhlef	4,215	17,970	30	17,940	مركز: بني يخلف
06.371.03.03.	Ech-challalate	12,840	53,503	65	53,438	الشلالات
06.371.03.05.	Sidi Moussa Ben Ali	2,650	11,445	4	11,441	سيدي موسى بن علي
06.371.03.07.	Sidi Moussa Majdoub	4,917	20,330	6	20,324	سيدي موسى المجدوب
06.385.	Province: Nouaceur	76,711	333,604	1,076	332,528	إقليم: النواصر
06.385.01.01.	Bouskoura (Mun.)	23,319	103,026	216	102,810	بوسكورة (البلدية)
06.385.01.02.	Dar Bouazza (Mun.)	35,998	151,373	750	150,623	دار بوعزة (البلدية)
06.385.01.03.	Nouaceur (Mun.)	4,913	23,802	71	23,731	النواصر (البلدية)
06.385.03.	Cercle : Bouskoura	12,481	55,403	39	55,364	دائرة : بوسكورة
06.385.03.03.	Oulad Azzouz	9,165	40,372	23	40,349	اولاد عزوز
06.385.03.05.	Oulad Salah	3,316	15,031	16	15,015	أولاد صالح
06.461.	Province: Settat	119,283	634,184	609	633,575	إقليم: سطات
06.461.01.01.	Ben Ahmed (Mun.)	7,222	33,105	17	33,088	بن أحمد (البلدية)
06.461.01.05.	El Borouj (Mun.)	3,841	19,235	5	19,230	البروج (البلدية)
06.461.01.09.	Loulad (Mun.)	1,209	6,057	1	6,056	لولاد (البلدية)
06.461.01.13.	Oulad M'Rah (Mun.)	1,746	8,697	6	8,691	اولاد امراح (البلدية)
06.461.01.15.	Settat (Mun.)	32,714	142,250	547	141,703	سطات (البلدية)
06.461.03.	Cercle : Ben Ahmed	29,383	173,290	16	173,274	دائرة : بن أحمد
06.461.03.02.	Ain Dorbane-Lahlaf	1,451	8,120	0	8,120	عين الضربان-لحلاف
06.461.03.03.	Bouguargouh	1,543	9,539	0	9,539	بوكركوح
06.461.03.07.	Lakhzazra	1,513	8,582	0	8,582	لخزازرة
06.461.03.09.	Mniaa	1,898	11,789	0	11,789	امنيع
06.461.03.11.	Mrizigue	1,430	8,376	0	8,376	امريزيك
06.461.03.13.	M'Garto	1,585	8,514	0	8,514	امكارطو
06.461.03.15.	N'Khila	2,082	12,306	0	12,306	انخيلة
06.461.03.17.	Oued Naanaa	1,308	6,991	0	6,991	واد النعناع
06.461.03.19.	Oulad Chbana	1,319	8,081	0	8,081	اولاد شبانة
06.461.03.21.	Oulad Fares	1,947	12,341	0	12,341	اولاد فارس
06.461.03.23.	Oulad M'Hamed	1,746	10,187	0	10,187	اولاد امحمد
06.461.03.25.	Ras El Ain Chaouia	2,757	14,747	0	14,747	رأس العين الشاوية
06.461.03.25.3.	Dont Centre: Ras E l Ain	753	3,614	0	3,614	مركز: راس العين
06.461.03.27.	Sgamna	1,560	10,245	0	10,245	السكامنة
06.461.03.29.	Sidi Abdelkrim	2,273	14,037	14	14,023	سيدي عبد الكريم
06.461.03.31.	Sidi Dahbi	1,572	8,703	1	8,702	سيدي الذهبي
06.461.03.33.	Sidi Hajjaj	3,399	20,732	1	20,731	سيدي حجاج
06.461.07.	Cercle : El Borouj	15,765	96,232	1	96,231	دائرة : البروج
06.461.07.01.	Ain Blal	906	4,699	0	4,699	عين بلال
06.461.07.03.	Bni Khloug	2,290	12,930	0	12,930	بني خلوك
06.461.07.05.	Dar Chaffai	2,913	17,454	1	17,453	دار الشافعي
06.461.07.07.	Laqraqra	1,833	11,419	0	11,419	لقراقرة
06.461.07.09.	Meskoura	1,113	7,180	0	7,180	مسكورة
06.461.07.11.	Oulad Amer	1,081	6,673	0	6,673	اولاد عامر
06.461.07.13.	Oulad Bouali Nouaja	1,065	6,507	0	6,507	أولاد بوعلي النواجة
06.461.07.15.	Oulad Fares El Halla	525	3,021	0	3,021	أولاد فارس الحلة
06.461.07.17.	Oulad Freiha	1,838	11,581	0	11,581	أولاد فريحة
06.461.07.19.	Sidi Ahmed El Khadir	1,404	9,687	0	9,687	سيدي أحمد الخدير
06.461.07.21.	Sidi Boumehdi	797	5,081	0	5,081	سيدي بومهدي
06.461.09.	Cercle : Settat	27,403	155,318	16	155,302	دائرة : سطات
06.461.09.03.	Bni Yagrine	2,023	13,031	0	13,031	بني ياكرين
06.461.09.05.	Gdana	1,669	9,084	3	9,081	كدانة
06.461.09.07.	Guisser	2,272	12,289	2	12,287	كيسر
06.461.09.07.3.	Dont Centre: Guisser	526	2,471	0	2,471	مركز: كيسر
06.461.09.09.	Khemisset Chaouia	1,058	5,527	1	5,526	اخميسات الشاوية
06.461.09.11.	Lahouaza	1,368	7,394	0	7,394	لحوازة
06.461.09.13.	Machraa Ben Abbou	1,574	9,355	0	9,355	مشرع بن عبو
06.461.09.14.	Mzamza Janoubia	3,485	20,802	4	20,798	امزامزة الجنوبية
06.461.09.15.	Mzoura	1,855	9,525	0	9,525	امزورة
06.461.09.19.	Oulad Said	1,798	9,271	0	9,271	اولاد سعيد
06.461.09.19.3.	Dont Centre: Oulad Said	491	2,205	0	2,205	مركز: أولاد سعيد
06.461.09.21.	Oulad Sghir	2,528	13,866	0	13,866	اولاد الصغير
06.461.09.23.	Rima	1,473	8,949	0	8,949	ريمة
06.461.09.25.	Sidi El Aidi	2,562	13,839	6	13,833	سيدي العايدي
06.461.09.27.	Sidi Mohammed Ben Rahal	1,813	10,410	0	10,410	سيدي محمد بن رحال
06.461.09.31.	Toualet	1,925	11,976	0	11,976	ثوالت
06.467.	Province: Sidi Bennour	87,032	452,448	90	452,358	إقليم: سيدي بنور
06.467.01.07.	Sidi Bennour (Mun.)	12,507	55,815	43	55,772	سيدي بنور (البلدية)
06.467.01.09.	Zemamra (Mun.)	2,916	13,279	4	13,275	زمامرة (البلدية)
06.467.07.	Cercle : Sidi Bennour	47,392	253,952	11	253,941	دائرة : سيدي بنور
06.467.07.01.	Bni Hilal	3,561	17,843	0	17,843	بني هلال
06.467.07.03.	Bni Tsiriss	2,474	14,067	0	14,067	بني تسيريس
06.467.07.05.	Bouhmame	4,098	23,234	0	23,234	بوحمام
06.467.07.07.	Jabria	3,617	19,676	0	19,676	جابرية
06.467.07.09.	Khmis Ksiba	1,030	5,665	0	5,665	خميس قصيبة
06.467.07.11.	Koudiat Bni Dghough	2,865	15,181	0	15,181	كدية بني دغوغ
06.467.07.13.	Kridid	2,484	14,351	5	14,346	كرديد
06.467.07.13.3.	Dont Centre: Sebt Lamaarif	318	1,834	0	1,834	مركز: سبت المعاريف
06.467.07.15.	Laagagcha	2,666	13,748	0	13,748	لعكاكشة
06.467.07.17.	Laamria	1,921	10,520	0	10,520	العامرية
06.467.07.19.	Laaounate	3,564	17,850	3	17,847	العونات
06.467.07.19.3.	Dont Centre: Laaounate	1,140	5,185	3	5,182	مركز: العونات
06.467.07.21.	Laatatra	3,190	17,593	0	17,593	لعطاطرة
06.467.07.23.	Lmechrek	2,895	16,141	1	16,140	المشرك
06.467.07.25.	Metrane	2,094	10,580	0	10,580	مطران
06.467.07.27.	M'Tal	1,966	9,913	1	9,912	امطل
06.467.07.29.	Oulad Amrane	2,371	12,252	0	12,252	أولاد عمران
06.467.07.29.3.	Dont Centre: Oulad Amrane	401	1,799	0	1,799	مركز: اولاد عمران
06.467.07.31.	Oulad Boussaken	1,357	7,390	0	7,390	أولاد بوساكن
06.467.07.33.	Oulad Si Bouhya	3,308	18,198	1	18,197	أولاد سي بوحيى
06.467.07.35.	Tamda	1,931	9,750	0	9,750	تامدة
06.467.11.	Cercle : Zemamra	24,217	129,402	32	129,370	دائرة : زمامرة
06.467.11.01.	Laghnadra	6,324	33,553	2	33,551	الغنادرة
06.467.11.03.	Lgharbia	4,349	22,729	1	22,728	الغربية
06.467.11.05.	Loualidia	3,715	18,616	28	18,588	الوليدية
06.467.11.05.3.	Dont Centre: Loualidia	1,805	7,770	24	7,746	مركز: الوليدية
06.467.11.07.	Oulad Sbaita	4,392	25,650	0	25,650	أولاد سبيطة
06.467.11.09.	Saniat Berguig	5,437	28,854	1	28,853	سانية بركيك
07.	Marrakech-Safi	928,120	4,520,569	8,636	4,511,933	مراكش - آسفي
07.041.	Province: Al Haouz	111,627	573,128	362	572,766	إقليم: الحوز
07.041.01.01.	Ait Ourir (Mun.)	8,285	39,108	20	39,088	أيت أورير (البلدية)
07.041.01.03.	Amizmiz (Mun.)	3,506	14,364	15	14,349	أمزميز (البلدية)
07.041.01.09.	Tahannaout (Mun.)	2,684	12,102	12	12,090	تحناوت (البلدية)
07.041.03.	Cercle : Ait Ourir	28,991	149,268	97	149,171	دائرة : أيت اورير
07.041.03.05.	Ait Faska	5,264	26,210	4	26,206	أيت فاسكا
07.041.03.09.	Ait Sidi Daoud	3,753	18,976	2	18,974	أيت سيدي داود
07.041.03.11.	Ghmate	4,808	25,220	28	25,192	اغمات
07.041.03.11.3.	Dont Centre: Ghmate	247	1,208	4	1,204	مركز: اغمات
07.041.03.13.	Iguerferouane	2,019	11,812	1	11,811	اكرفروان
07.041.03.15.	Sidi Abdallah Ghiat	6,157	29,498	56	29,442	سيدي عبد الله غيات
07.041.03.15.3.	Dont Centre: Sidi Abdallah Ghiat	368	1,701	1	1,700	مركز: سيدي عبد الله غيات
07.041.03.19.	Tamazouzte	2,944	15,846	4	15,842	تمزوزت
07.041.03.23.	Tidili Mesfioua	4,046	21,706	2	21,704	تيدلي مسفيوة
07.041.05.	Cercle : Amizmiz	11,049	53,270	24	53,246	دائرة : امزميز
07.041.05.01.	Amghras	1,194	6,160	0	6,160	امغراس
07.041.05.05.	Anougal	874	4,353	1	4,352	انوكال
07.041.05.07.	Azgour	1,356	6,865	0	6,865	ازكور
07.041.05.09.	Dar Jamaa	1,269	5,911	0	5,911	دار جمعة
07.041.05.11.	Lalla Takarkoust	1,643	7,311	18	7,293	للا تكركوست
07.041.05.11.3.	Dont Centre: Lalla Takarkoust	932	4,080	10	4,070	مركز: للا تكركوست
07.041.05.13.	Ouazguita	1,029	5,440	1	5,439	وزكيطة
07.041.05.15.	Oulad Mtaa	1,430	6,937	1	6,936	أولاد امطاع
07.041.05.17.	Sidi Badhaj	1,149	5,394	2	5,392	سيدي بدهاج
07.041.05.19.	Tizguine	1,105	4,899	1	4,898	تيزكين
07.041.07.	Cercle : Asni	11,415	59,881	11	59,870	دائرة : أسني
07.041.07.01.	Aghbar	909	5,182	0	5,182	اغبار
07.041.07.03.	Asni	3,883	21,244	1	21,243	أسني
07.041.07.05.	Ighil	997	5,695	0	5,695	اغيل
07.041.07.07.	Ijoukak	1,207	6,700	1	6,699	اجوكاك
07.041.07.09.	Imgdal	1,156	5,467	0	5,467	امكدال
07.041.07.11.	Ouirgane	1,583	7,727	8	7,719	ويركان
07.041.07.13.	Talat N'Yaaqoub	1,680	7,866	1	7,865	تلات نيعقوب
07.041.09.	Cercle : Tahannaout	27,521	137,873	166	137,707	دائرة : تحناوت
07.041.09.01.	Moulay Brahim	2,389	11,813	0	11,813	مولاي ابراهيم
07.041.09.01.3.	Dont Centre: Moulay Brahim	731	3,115	0	3,115	مركز: مولاي ابراهيم
07.041.09.03.	Oukaimden	782	4,861	4	4,857	أوكايمدن
07.041.09.05.	Ourika	7,598	37,316	26	37,290	أوريكة
07.041.09.07.	Sti Fadma	4,279	24,129	5	24,124	ستي فاطمة
07.041.09.11.	Tameslohte	6,457	28,978	113	28,865	تمصلوحت
07.041.09.11.3.	Dont Centre: Tameslohte	2,092	9,093	10	9,083	مركز: تمصلوحت
07.041.09.13.	Aghouatim	6,016	30,776	18	30,758	اغواطيم
07.041.11.	Cercle : Touama	18,176	107,262	17	107,245	دائرة : توامة
07.041.11.01.	Abadou	1,764	10,602	0	10,602	ابادو
07.041.11.03.	Ait Aadel	1,166	7,925	0	7,925	أيت عادل
07.041.11.07.	Ait Hkim-Ait Yzid	1,294	8,812	0	8,812	أيت حكيم - أيت يزيد
07.041.11.17.	Tamaguert	2,074	10,540	0	10,540	تمكرت
07.041.11.21.	Tazart	2,660	15,243	0	15,243	تزارت
07.041.11.25.	Tighedouine	3,635	22,971	0	22,971	تيغدوين
07.041.11.27.	Touama	2,273	11,243	16	11,227	التوامة
07.041.11.29.	Zerkten	3,310	19,926	1	19,925	زرقطن
07.161.	Province: Chichaoua	73,928	369,955	66	369,889	إقليم: شيشاوة
07.161.01.01.	Chichaoua (Mun.)	6,024	27,869	41	27,828	شيشاوة (البلدية)
07.161.01.03.	Imintanoute (Mun.)	4,710	20,837	5	20,832	امنتانوت (البلدية)
07.161.03.	Cercle : Chichaoua	18,429	95,852	8	95,844	دائرة : شيشاوة
07.161.03.01.	Ahdil	1,812	11,438	0	11,438	أهديل
07.161.03.03.	Ait Hadi	1,554	7,431	0	7,431	أيت هادي
07.161.03.05.	Lamzoudia	4,470	25,674	1	25,673	لمزوضية
07.161.03.07.	Oulad Moumna	1,448	7,513	0	7,513	اولاد مومنة
07.161.03.09.	Saidate	1,319	6,427	1	6,426	السعيدات
07.161.03.11.	Sid L'Mokhtar	4,859	22,714	5	22,709	سيدي المختار
07.161.03.11.3.	Dont Centre: Sid L'Mokhtar	3,042	13,557	3	13,554	مركز: سيدي المختار
07.161.03.13.	Sidi Bouzid Arragragui	1,862	8,971	1	8,970	سيدي بوزيد الركراكي
07.161.03.15.	Sidi M'Hamed Dalil	1,105	5,684	0	5,684	سيدي امحمد دليل
07.161.05.	Cercle : Imintanoute	12,823	63,761	4	63,757	دائرة : امنتانوت
07.161.05.01.	Afalla Issen	1,724	8,129	0	8,129	افلا يسن
07.161.05.03.	Ain Tazitounte	1,103	5,509	1	5,508	عين تزيتونت
07.161.05.05.	Ait Haddou Youssef	1,023	6,263	2	6,261	أيت حدو يوسف
07.161.05.07.	Irohalen	1,186	5,854	0	5,854	ارحالن
07.161.05.09.	Lalla Aaziza	1,497	8,448	0	8,448	للا عزيزة
07.161.05.11.	Nfifa	1,454	6,463	0	6,463	نفيفة
07.161.05.13.	Ouad L'bour	1,299	5,944	0	5,944	واد البور
07.161.05.15.	Sidi Ghanem	1,905	9,326	1	9,325	سيدي غانم
07.161.05.17.	Timezgadiouine	1,632	7,825	0	7,825	تمزكدوين
07.161.07.	Cercle : Majjat	19,064	99,017	8	99,009	دائرة : مجاط
07.161.07.01.	Adassil	1,400	7,454	0	7,454	اداسيل
07.161.07.03.	Assif El Mal	1,542	7,511	0	7,511	اسيف المال
07.161.07.05.	Douirane	3,197	16,138	2	16,136	ادويران
07.161.07.07.	Gmassa	1,996	9,388	4	9,384	كماسة
07.161.07.09.	Imindounit	1,846	11,363	0	11,363	امندونيت
07.161.07.11.	Majjat	2,569	13,258	1	13,257	مجاط
07.161.07.13.	M'Zouda	4,583	23,148	1	23,147	امزوضة
07.161.07.15.	Zaouia Annahlia	1,931	10,757	0	10,757	الزاوية النحلية
07.161.09.	Cercle : Mtouga	12,878	62,619	0	62,619	دائرة : امتوكة
07.161.09.01.	Bouabout	2,240	11,494	0	11,494	بوعبوط
07.161.09.03.	Bouabout Amdlane	1,513	7,541	0	7,541	بوعبوط امدلان
07.161.09.05.	Ichamraren	1,382	7,023	0	7,023	اشمرارن
07.161.09.07.	Kouzemt	865	4,103	0	4,103	كوزمت
07.161.09.09.	Rahhala	1,195	5,691	0	5,691	رحالة
07.161.09.11.	Sidi Abdelmoumen	1,970	9,007	0	9,007	سيدي عبد المومن
07.161.09.13.	Taouloukoult	2,242	10,682	0	10,682	تاولوكلت
07.161.09.15.	Timlilt	1,471	7,078	0	7,078	تمليلت
07.191.	Province: El Kelâa des Sraghna	97,874	537,488	115	537,373	إقليم: قلعة السراغنة
07.191.01.03.	El Kelaâ des Sraghna (Mun.)	20,139	95,224	79	95,145	قلعة السراغنة (البلدية)
07.191.01.05.	Laattaouia (Mun.)	6,125	30,315	7	30,308	العطاوية (البلدية)
07.191.01.07.	Sidi Rahhal (Mun.)	2,012	9,906	3	9,903	سيدي رحال (البلدية)
07.191.01.09.	Tamallalt (Mun.)	3,200	16,539	4	16,535	تملالت (البلدية)
07.191.03.	Cercle : El Kelaa Des Sraghna	29,029	172,632	9	172,623	دائرة : قلعة السراغنة
07.191.03.01.	Chtaiba	1,545	9,122	0	9,122	الشطيبة
07.191.03.03.	Eddachra	1,310	7,522	1	7,521	الدشرة
07.191.03.05.	El Aamria	1,551	9,454	0	9,454	العامرية
07.191.03.07.	El Marbouh	1,621	8,774	2	8,772	المربوح
07.191.03.09.	Errafiaya	939	5,502	0	5,502	الرافعية
07.191.03.11.	Hiadna	1,854	11,387	1	11,386	الهيادنة
07.191.03.13.	Lounasda	1,755	10,639	0	10,639	لوناسدة
07.191.03.15.	Mayate	1,989	12,101	0	12,101	ميات
07.191.03.17.	Oulad Aamer	1,130	7,015	1	7,014	أولاد عامر
07.191.03.19.	Oulad Bouali Loued	1,178	6,822	0	6,822	أولاد بوعلي الواد
07.191.03.21.	Oulad Cherki	1,204	7,399	0	7,399	أولاد الشرقي
07.191.03.23.	Oulad El Garne	1,333	8,150	0	8,150	أولاد الكرن
07.191.03.25.	Oulad Massaoud	856	5,011	0	5,011	أولاد مسعود
07.191.03.27.	Oulad Msabbel	1,026	6,254	3	6,251	أولاد امسبل
07.191.03.29.	Oulad Sbih	1,223	6,616	0	6,616	أولاد اصبيح
07.191.03.31.	Oulad Yaacoub	1,289	7,143	0	7,143	أولاد يعقوب
07.191.03.33.	Oulad Zarrad	2,064	12,233	1	12,232	أولاد زراد
07.191.03.35.	Sidi El Hattab	1,475	9,421	0	9,421	سيدي الحطاب
07.191.03.37.	Sidi Moussa	1,462	9,704	0	9,704	سيدي موسى
07.191.03.39.	Taouzint	964	5,651	0	5,651	توزينت
07.191.03.41.	Znada	1,261	6,712	0	6,712	ازنادة
07.191.05.	Cercle : Laattaouia	25,904	146,903	6	146,897	دائرة : العطاوية
07.191.05.01.	Assahrij	2,695	15,385	0	15,385	الصهريج
07.191.05.01.3.	Dont Centre: Assahrij	444	2,011	0	2,011	مركز: الصهريج
07.191.05.03.	Bouya Omar	2,587	14,154	0	14,154	بويا عمر
07.191.05.05.	Choara	2,026	11,023	0	11,023	الشعراء
07.191.05.07.	Dzouz	1,928	11,501	1	11,500	دزوز
07.191.05.09.	Fraita	1,968	11,298	0	11,298	فرايطة
07.191.05.15.	Laatamna	1,772	10,063	1	10,062	العثامنة
07.191.05.16.	Laattaouia Ech-chaibia	982	5,444	0	5,444	العطاوية الشعيبية
07.191.05.17.	Louad Lakhdar	1,636	9,303	0	9,303	الواد لخضر
07.191.05.19.	M'Zem Sanhaja	1,663	10,310	1	10,309	مزم صنهاجة
07.191.05.21.	Ouargui	1,881	10,384	0	10,384	واركي
07.191.05.23.	Oulad Aarrad	981	5,606	0	5,606	أولاد عراض
07.191.05.25.	Oulad Khallouf	1,488	8,605	1	8,604	أولاد خلوف
07.191.05.27.	Sidi Aissa Ben Slimane	3,578	19,977	1	19,976	سيدي عيسى بن سليمان
07.191.05.29.	Sour El Aaz	719	3,850	1	3,849	سور العز
07.191.07.	Cercle : Tamallalt	11,465	65,969	7	65,962	دائرة : تاملالت
07.191.07.11.	Jbiel	1,999	11,376	2	11,374	اجبيل
07.191.07.13.	Jouala	2,023	11,168	0	11,168	الجوالة
07.191.07.31.	Zemrane	2,453	14,338	2	14,336	زمران
07.191.07.33.	Zemrane Charqia	4,990	29,087	3	29,084	زمران الشرقية
07.211.	Province: Essaouira	95,520	450,527	795	449,732	إقليم: الصويرة
07.211.01.01.	Ait Daoud (Mun.)	657	2,957	0	2,957	أيت داوود (البلدية)
07.211.01.03.	El Hanchane (Mun.)	1,131	4,965	12	4,953	الحنشان (البلدية)
07.211.01.05.	Essaouira (Mun.)	20,290	77,966	540	77,426	الصويرة (البلدية)
07.211.01.07.	Talmest (Mun.)	1,039	4,328	1	4,327	تالمست (البلدية)
07.211.01.09.	Tamanar (Mun.)	2,373	10,584	0	10,584	تمنار (البلدية)
07.211.03.	Cercle : Essaouira	39,768	198,373	124	198,249	دائرة : الصويرة
07.211.03.01.	Ait Said	1,434	6,819	3	6,816	أيت سعيد
07.211.03.03.	Aquermoud	3,155	15,662	6	15,656	اقرمود
07.211.03.05.	Had Dra	2,051	8,989	17	8,972	حد الدرا
07.211.03.07.	Kechoula	1,149	6,083	0	6,083	كشولة
07.211.03.09.	Korimate	1,927	9,897	0	9,897	كريمات
07.211.03.11.	Lagdadra	1,425	6,825	3	6,822	لكدادرة
07.211.03.13.	Lahsinate	1,103	5,315	0	5,315	لحسينات
07.211.03.15.	Mejji	1,281	6,750	0	6,750	مجي
07.211.03.17.	Meskala	903	4,330	0	4,330	مسكالة
07.211.03.19.	Mouarid	1,172	6,161	0	6,161	المواريد
07.211.03.21.	Moulay Bouzarqtoune	1,267	6,069	21	6,048	مولاي بوزرقطون
07.211.03.23.	Mzilate	782	4,209	2	4,207	امزيلات
07.211.03.25.	M'Khalif	1,062	5,387	0	5,387	امخاليف
07.211.03.27.	M'Ramer	1,452	7,587	0	7,587	امرامر
07.211.03.29.	Oulad M'Rabet	773	3,996	1	3,995	أولاد امرابط
07.211.03.31.	Ounagha	2,807	12,461	71	12,390	اوناغة
07.211.03.31.3.	Dont Centre: Ounagha	317	1,234	5	1,229	مركز: اوناغة
07.211.03.33.	Sidi Abdeljalil	1,419	6,618	0	6,618	سيدي عبد الجليل
07.211.03.35.	Sidi Aissa Regragui	1,488	7,873	0	7,873	سيدي عيسى الركراكي
07.211.03.37.	Sidi Ali El Korati	1,390	6,546	0	6,546	سيدي علي الكراتي
07.211.03.39.	Sidi Boulaalam	1,561	8,142	0	8,142	سيدي بولعلام
07.211.03.41.	Sidi Ishaq	1,935	9,773	0	9,773	سيدي اسحاق
07.211.03.43.	Sidi Laaroussi	2,148	12,357	0	12,357	سيدي لعروسي
07.211.03.45.	Sidi M'Hamed Ou Marzouq	925	5,341	0	5,341	سيدي امحمد اومرزوق
07.211.03.47.	Tafetachte	1,491	7,293	0	7,293	تفتاشت
07.211.03.47.3.	Dont Centre: Tafetachte	334	1,271	0	1,271	مركز: تفتاشت
07.211.03.49.	Takate	2,255	10,968	0	10,968	تكاط
07.211.03.51.	Zaouiat Ben Hmida	1,413	6,922	0	6,922	زاوية بن احميدة
07.211.05.	Cercle : Tamanar	30,262	151,354	118	151,236	دائرة : تمنار
07.211.05.01.	Adaghas	519	2,825	0	2,825	ادغاس
07.211.05.03.	Aglif	1,620	8,028	0	8,028	اكليف
07.211.05.05.	Aguerd	1,182	5,378	64	5,314	اكرض
07.211.05.07.	Ait Aissi Ihahane	836	4,143	0	4,143	أيت عيسى اححان
07.211.05.09.	Assais	1,283	6,915	0	6,915	اسايس
07.211.05.11.	Bizdad	1,604	7,959	0	7,959	بيز ضاض
07.211.05.13.	Bouzemmour	1,066	5,874	1	5,873	بوزمور
07.211.05.15.	Ezzaouite	1,220	6,341	0	6,341	الزاويت
07.211.05.17.	Ida Ou Aazza	1,467	7,923	0	7,923	ايذا وعزا
07.211.05.19.	Ida Ou Guelloul	1,198	5,999	0	5,999	ايدا اوكلول
07.211.05.21.	Ida Ou Kazzou	1,026	5,182	0	5,182	ايدا وكازو
07.211.05.23.	Imgrade	1,257	6,486	0	6,486	امكراد
07.211.05.25.	Imi N'Tlit	1,479	8,057	0	8,057	ايمي نتليت
07.211.05.27.	Sidi Ahmed Essayeh	1,264	6,198	1	6,197	سيدي أحمد السايح
07.211.05.29.	Sidi El Jazouli	1,290	6,462	0	6,462	سيدي الجزولي
07.211.05.31.	Sidi Ghaneme	893	4,718	0	4,718	سيدي غانم
07.211.05.33.	Sidi H'Mad Ou M'Barek	1,212	5,482	0	5,482	سيدي احمد او مبارك
07.211.05.35.	Sidi Hmad Ou Hamed	890	4,034	3	4,031	سيدي احمد أوحامد
07.211.05.37.	Sidi Kaouki	1,101	4,625	43	4,582	سيدي كاوكي
07.211.05.39.	Smimou	1,750	8,026	1	8,025	سميمو
07.211.05.39.3.	Dont Centre: Smimou	732	3,210	1	3,209	مركز: سميمو
07.211.05.41.	Tafedna	1,113	5,617	0	5,617	تافضنا
07.211.05.43.	Tahelouante	756	3,919	0	3,919	تاهلوانت
07.211.05.45.	Takoucht	907	4,312	0	4,312	تاكوشت
07.211.05.47.	Targante	1,457	7,605	0	7,605	تاركانت
07.211.05.49.	Tidzi	873	4,057	5	4,052	تدزي
07.211.05.51.	Timizguida-Ouftas	999	5,189	0	5,189	تمزكدة- أوفتاس
07.351.	Préfecture: Marrakech	302,137	1,330,468	6,764	1,323,704	عمالة: مراكش
07.351.01.01.	Méchouar-Kasba (Mun.)	3,973	16,860	173	16,687	المشور-القصبة (البلدية)
07.351.01.03.	Annakhil (Arrond.)	14,466	64,590	559	64,031	النخيل (المقاطعة)
07.351.01.05.	Gueliz (Arrond.)	49,314	192,774	3,608	189,166	جليز (المقاطعة)
07.351.01.07.	Marrakech-Médina (Arrond.)	28,549	120,643	383	120,260	مراكش المدينة (المقاطعة)
07.351.01.09.	Ménara (Arrond.)	94,686	411,094	1,317	409,777	المنارة (المقاطعة)
07.351.01.11.	Sidi Youssef Ben Ali (Arrond.)	26,257	122,889	52	122,837	سيدي يوسف بن علي (المقاطعة)
07.351.02.	Cercle : Alouidane	16,146	76,989	392	76,597	دائرة : الويدان
07.351.02.01.	Alouidane	5,954	28,194	236	27,958	الويدان
07.351.02.07.	Ouahat Sidi Brahim	5,425	25,320	88	25,232	واحة سيدي ابراهيم
07.351.02.09.	Oulad Hassoune	4,767	23,475	68	23,407	أولاد حسون
07.351.03.	Cercle : Bour	16,385	79,490	33	79,457	دائرة : البور
07.351.03.03.	Harbil	11,735	51,881	32	51,849	حربيل
07.351.03.03.3.	Dont Centre: Tamensourte	6,157	25,077	31	25,046	مركز: تمنصورت
07.351.03.05.	M'Nabha	2,301	12,893	1	12,892	المنابهة
07.351.03.05.3.	Dont Centre: M'Nabha	286	1,169	1	1,168	مركز: المنابهة
07.351.03.11.	Ouled Dlim	2,349	14,716	0	14,716	أولاد دليم
07.351.05.	Cercle : Loudaya	15,679	78,717	43	78,674	دائرة : الأوداية
07.351.05.01.	Agafay	3,132	15,452	3	15,449	اكفاي
07.351.05.03.	Ait Imour	2,767	14,544	3	14,541	أيت ايمور
07.351.05.05.	Loudaya	6,615	33,767	27	33,740	الأوداية
07.351.05.05.3.	Dont Centre: Loudaya	2,634	12,615	14	12,601	مركز: الأوداية
07.351.05.09.	Sid Zouine	3,165	14,954	10	14,944	سيدي الزوين
07.351.05.09.3.	Dont Centre: Sid Zouine	2,741	12,837	10	12,827	مركز: سيدي الزوين
07.351.07.	Cercle : Saada	36,682	166,422	204	166,218	دائرة : سعادة
07.351.07.07.	Saada	14,435	67,086	23	67,063	سعادة
07.351.07.11.	Souihla	5,552	28,164	8	28,156	السويهلة
07.351.07.13.	Tassoultante	16,695	71,172	173	70,999	تسلطانت
07.427.	Province: Rehamna	57,514	315,077	65	315,012	إقليم: الرحامنة
07.427.01.01.	Ben Guerir (Mun.)	18,752	88,626	20	88,606	ابن جرير (البلدية)
07.427.01.17.	Sidi Bou Othmane (Mun.)	1,873	9,181	3	9,178	سيدي بوعثمان (البلدية)
07.427.07.	Cercle : Rehamna	19,720	118,259	9	118,250	دائرة : الرحامنة
07.427.07.01.	Ait Hammou	1,185	7,548	0	7,548	أيت حمو
07.427.07.03.	Ait Taleb	1,416	8,649	0	8,649	أيت الطالب
07.427.07.05.	Bouchane	1,663	9,705	0	9,705	بوشان
07.427.07.07.	Jaafra	1,545	10,896	0	10,896	الجعافرة
07.427.07.09.	Labrikiyne	2,088	11,619	1	11,618	لبريكيين
07.427.07.11.	Oulad Aamer Tizmarine	880	5,150	0	5,150	أولاد عامر تزمرين
07.427.07.13.	Oulad Hassoune Hamri	1,206	7,662	0	7,662	أولاد حسون حمري
07.427.07.15.	Sidi Abdallah	1,723	10,481	0	10,481	سيدي عبد الله
07.427.07.17.	Sidi Ali Labrahla	1,115	6,618	0	6,618	سيدي علي لبراحلة
07.427.07.19.	Sidi Ghanem	1,636	10,099	0	10,099	سيدي غانم
07.427.07.21.	Sidi Mansour	935	5,488	0	5,488	سيدي منصور
07.427.07.23.	Skhour Rehamna	2,976	15,479	4	15,475	صخور الرحامنة
07.427.07.23.3.	Dont Centre: Skhour Rehamna	1,168	5,344	3	5,341	مركز: صخور الرحامنة
07.427.07.25.	Skoura Lhadra	1,352	8,865	4	8,861	سكورة الحدرة
07.427.09.	Cercle : Sidi Bou Othmane	17,169	99,011	33	98,978	دائرة : سيدي بو عثمان
07.427.09.01.	Akarma	811	5,171	0	5,171	عكرمة
07.427.09.03.	Bourrous	1,080	5,986	2	5,984	بوروس
07.427.09.05.	Jaidate	2,388	12,330	22	12,308	الجعيدات
07.427.09.06.	Jbilate	2,002	11,234	2	11,232	الجبيلات
07.427.09.07.	Lamharra	1,591	9,477	3	9,474	لمحرة
07.427.09.09.	Nzalat Laadam	2,221	14,838	1	14,837	انزالت لعظم
07.427.09.11.	Oulad Imloul	1,712	9,614	0	9,614	أولاد املول
07.427.09.13.	Ras Ain Rhamna	2,621	14,284	2	14,282	رأس عين الرحامنة
07.427.09.15.	Sidi Boubker	1,003	6,145	0	6,145	سيدي بوبكر
07.427.09.19.	Tlauh	1,740	9,932	1	9,931	الطلوح
07.431.	Province: Safi	144,490	691,983	396	691,587	إقليم: آسفي
07.431.01.03.	Safi (Mun.)	72,935	308,508	333	308,175	آسفي (البلدية)
07.431.01.09.	Jamaat Shaim (Mun.)	2,496	11,251	15	11,236	جماعة سحيم (البلدية)
07.431.01.11.	Sebt Gzoula (Mun.)	4,136	18,543	7	18,536	سبت كزولة (البلدية)
07.431.03.	Cercle : Abda	21,512	122,458	3	122,455	دائرة : عبدة
07.431.03.01.	Bouguedra	2,898	16,014	0	16,014	بوكدرة
07.431.03.01.3.	Dont Centre: Bouguedra	416	1,948	0	1,948	مركز: بوكدرة
07.431.03.02.	Chahda	1,911	10,370	0	10,370	شهدة
07.431.03.03.	El Gouraani	1,992	11,291	0	11,291	الكرعاني
07.431.03.05.	Labkhati	2,534	14,324	0	14,324	لبخاتي
07.431.03.07.	Lahdar	2,468	13,870	2	13,868	لحدار
07.431.03.09.	Lamrasla	3,101	18,335	0	18,335	لمراسلة
07.431.03.11.	Lamsabih	1,907	11,339	0	11,339	لمصابح
07.431.03.13.	Sidi Aissa	1,837	10,266	1	10,265	سيدي عيسى
07.431.03.15.	Sidi Ettiji	2,864	16,649	0	16,649	سيدي أتيجي
07.431.07.	Cercle : Gzoula	22,821	119,507	23	119,484	دائرة : كزولة
07.431.07.01.	Atouabet	2,108	10,704	0	10,704	اتوابت
07.431.07.03.	El Ghiate	4,654	25,162	0	25,162	الغيات
07.431.07.05.	Khatazakane	3,187	16,014	2	16,012	خط ازكان
07.431.07.07.	Laamamra	2,248	12,717	0	12,717	لعمامرة
07.431.07.09.	Lamaachate	3,182	15,389	18	15,371	لمعاشات
07.431.07.11.	Nagga	4,133	22,542	0	22,542	نكا
07.431.07.13.	Ouled Salmane	3,309	16,979	3	16,976	أولاد سلمان
07.431.09.	Cercle : Hrara	20,590	111,716	15	111,701	دائرة : حرارة
07.431.09.01.	Ayir	4,876	27,608	3	27,605	أيير
07.431.09.01.3.	Dont Centre: Laakarta	813	4,369	1	4,368	مركز: العكارطة
07.431.09.03.	Dar Si Aissa	2,269	11,946	0	11,946	دار سي عيسى
07.431.09.05.	El Beddouza	2,502	14,084	1	14,083	البدوزة
07.431.09.07.	Hrara	4,824	26,103	5	26,098	حرارة
07.431.09.07.3.	Dont Centre: Hrara	272	1,271	0	1,271	مركز: حرارة
07.431.09.09.	Moul El Bergui	2,858	15,342	1	15,341	مول البركي
07.431.09.15.	Saadla	3,261	16,633	5	16,628	اصعادلا
07.585.	Province: Youssoufia	45,030	251,943	73	251,870	إقليم: اليوسفية
07.585.01.07.	Echemmaia (Mun.)	4,911	24,303	4	24,299	الشماعية (البلدية)
07.585.01.13.	Youssoufia (Mun.)	14,762	67,628	57	67,571	اليوسفية (البلدية)
07.585.05.	Cercle : Ahmar	12,662	83,473	0	83,473	دائرة : أحمر
07.585.05.07.	Ighoud	3,574	22,870	0	22,870	إيغود
07.585.05.07.3.	Dont Centre: Ighoud	365	1,826	0	1,826	مركز: ايغود
07.585.05.09.	Jdour	3,225	20,239	0	20,239	جدور
07.585.05.11.	Jnane Bouih	2,932	19,706	0	19,706	جنان بويه
07.585.05.17.	Sidi Chiker	2,931	20,658	0	20,658	سيدي شيكر
07.585.07.	Cercle : Al Gantour	12,695	76,539	12	76,527	دائرة : الكنتور
07.585.07.01.	Atiamim	1,207	7,020	3	7,017	اطياميم
07.585.07.03.	El Gantour	3,553	18,544	1	18,543	الكنتور
07.585.07.03.3.	Dont Centre: Sidi Ahmed	1,480	7,126	0	7,126	مركز: سيدي أحمد
07.585.07.05.	Esbiaat	2,493	14,986	0	14,986	اسبيعات
07.585.07.13.	Lakhoualqa	2,512	16,375	1	16,374	لخوالقة
07.585.07.15.	Ras El Ain	2,930	19,614	7	19,607	راس العين
08.	Drâa-Tafilalet	277,998	1,635,008	796	1,634,212	درعة - تافيلالت
08.201.	Province: Errachidia	75,264	418,451	212	418,239	إقليم: الرشيدية
08.201.01.01.	Arfoud (Mun.)	5,547	29,279	17	29,262	ارفود (البلدية)
08.201.01.03.	Boudnib (Mun.)	2,350	11,373	5	11,368	بوذنيب (البلدية)
08.201.01.05.	Errachidia (Mun.)	19,475	92,374	75	92,299	الرشيدية (البلدية)
08.201.01.09.	Goulmima (Mun.)	3,425	16,419	8	16,411	كلميمة (البلدية)
08.201.01.11.	Jorf (Mun.)	2,227	12,302	0	12,302	الجرف (البلدية)
08.201.01.13.	Moulay Ali Cherif (Mun.)	3,799	22,209	3	22,206	مولاي علي الشريف (البلدية)
08.201.01.15.	Tinejdad (Mun.)	1,691	8,942	53	8,889	تنجداد (البلدية)
08.201.03.	Cercle : Arfoud	5,286	35,101	1	35,100	دائرة : أرفود
08.201.03.01.	Aarab Sebbah Gheris	733	4,397	1	4,396	عرب صباح اغريس
08.201.03.03.	Aarab Sebbah Ziz	2,850	19,192	0	19,192	عرب صباح زيز
08.201.03.07.	Es-sifa	1,002	7,035	0	7,035	السيفا
08.201.03.09.	Fezna	701	4,477	0	4,477	فزنا
08.201.07.	Cercle : Errachidia	10,483	57,714	4	57,710	دائرة : الرشيدية
08.201.07.01.	Aoufous	1,950	10,424	1	10,423	اوفوس
08.201.07.01.3.	Dont Centre: Aufous	272	1,186	1	1,185	مركز: أوفوس
08.201.07.03.	Chorfa M'Daghra	2,545	14,312	3	14,309	شرفاء مدغرة
08.201.07.05.	Er-rteb	2,219	13,461	0	13,461	الرتب
08.201.07.07.	Lkheng	2,725	14,177	0	14,177	الخنك
08.201.07.09.	Oued Naam	1,044	5,340	0	5,340	وادي النعام
08.201.11.	Cercle : Er-Rissani	6,039	39,880	26	39,854	دائرة : الريصاني
08.201.11.01.	Bni M'Hamed-Sijelmassa	2,181	14,433	4	14,429	بني امحمد سجلماسة
08.201.11.03.	Er-rissani	650	5,010	0	5,010	الريصاني
08.201.11.05.	Es-sfalat	1,741	11,483	0	11,483	السفلات
08.201.11.07.	Et-taous	1,165	6,792	22	6,770	الطاوس
08.201.11.09.	Sidi Ali	302	2,162	0	2,162	سيدي علي
08.201.13.	Cercle : Goulmima	14,942	92,858	20	92,838	دائرة : كلميمة
08.201.13.01.	Aghbalou N'Kerdous	1,530	10,313	0	10,313	اغبالو انكردوس
08.201.13.02.	Amellagou	884	4,975	0	4,975	املاكو
08.201.13.03.	Ferkla El Oulia	3,573	22,722	11	22,711	فركلة العليا
08.201.13.05.	Ferkla Es-soufla	1,925	12,335	3	12,332	فركلة السفلى
08.201.13.07.	Gheris El Ouloui	1,926	12,043	1	12,042	اغريس العلوي
08.201.13.09.	Gheris Es-soufli	1,146	6,867	1	6,866	اغريس السفلي
08.201.13.11.	Melaab	2,713	17,360	0	17,360	ملعب
08.201.13.13.	Tadighoust	1,245	6,243	4	6,239	تاديغوست
08.363.	Province: Midelt	59,718	289,337	70	289,267	إقليم: ميدلت
08.363.01.03.	Midelt (Mun.)	13,111	55,304	38	55,266	ميدلت (البلدية)
08.363.01.07.	Er-rich (Mun.)	5,710	25,992	7	25,985	الريش (البلدية)
08.363.05.	Cercle : Boumia	12,777	60,120	3	60,117	دائرة : بومية
08.363.05.01.	Aghbalou	1,949	9,547	1	9,546	اغبالو
08.363.05.01.3.	Dont Centre: Aghbalou Nssardane	617	2,300	0	2,300	مركز: اغبالو نسردان
08.363.05.03.	Agoudim	734	4,113	0	4,113	أكوديم
08.363.05.13.	Anemzi	874	4,885	0	4,885	انمزي
08.363.05.15.	Boumia	4,426	18,212	2	18,210	بومية
08.363.05.15.3.	Dont Centre: Boumia	3,947	15,652	2	15,650	مركز: بومية
08.363.05.21.	Sidi Yahya Ou Youssef	942	4,637	0	4,637	سيدي يحيى اويوسف
08.363.05.23.	Tanourdi	486	2,872	0	2,872	تنوردي
08.363.05.25.	Tizi N'Ghachou	476	2,557	0	2,557	تيزي نغشو
08.363.05.27.	Tounfite	2,890	13,297	0	13,297	تونفيت
08.363.05.27.3.	Dont Centre: Tounfite	1,979	8,169	0	8,169	مركز: تونفيت
08.363.07.	Cercle : Midelt	11,591	55,512	6	55,506	دائرة : ميدلت
08.363.07.05.	Ait Ayach	2,264	11,946	2	11,944	أيت عياش
08.363.07.07.	Ait Ben Yacoub	820	4,012	0	4,012	أيت بن يعقوب
08.363.07.09.	Ait Izdeg	1,286	6,819	0	6,819	أيت ازدك
08.363.07.11.	Amersid	1,085	5,857	1	5,856	امرصيد
08.363.07.17.	Itzer	2,518	10,613	2	10,611	ايتزر
08.363.07.17.3.	Dont Centre: Itzer	1,531	5,896	2	5,894	مركز: ايتزر
08.363.07.19.	Mibladen	580	3,084	1	3,083	ميبلادن
08.363.07.29.	Zaida	3,038	13,181	0	13,181	زايدة
08.363.07.29.3.	Dont Centre: Zaida	1,812	7,172	0	7,172	مركز: زايدة
08.363.09.	Cercle : Er-Rich	10,667	57,737	15	57,722	دائرة : الريش
08.363.09.01.	En-nzala	820	4,390	0	4,390	النزالة
08.363.09.03.	Gourrama	2,906	14,927	4	14,923	كرامة
08.363.09.03.3.	Dont Centre: Gourrama	1,168	5,613	4	5,609	مركز: كرامة
08.363.09.05.	Guers Tiaallaline	2,399	12,927	3	12,924	غرس تعلالين
08.363.09.07.	Guir	782	4,022	0	4,022	كير
08.363.09.09.	M'Zizel	1,299	7,388	8	7,380	امزيزل
08.363.09.11.	Sidi Aayad	1,617	8,629	0	8,629	سيدي عياد
08.363.09.13.	Zaouiat Sidi Hamza	844	5,454	0	5,454	زاوية سيدي حمزة
08.363.15.	Cercle : Imilchil	5,862	34,672	1	34,671	دائرة : إملشيل
08.363.15.01.	Ait Yahya	736	4,560	0	4,560	أيت يحيى
08.363.15.03.	Amouguer	798	4,840	0	4,840	اموكر
08.363.15.05.	Bou Azmou	1,638	9,583	0	9,583	بوازمو
08.363.15.07.	Imilchil	1,517	8,870	1	8,869	املشيل
08.363.15.09.	Outerbat	1,173	6,819	0	6,819	اوتربات
08.401.	Province: Ouarzazate	54,959	297,502	281	297,221	إقليم: ورزازات
08.401.01.07.	Ouarzazate (Mun.)	15,475	71,067	192	70,875	ورزازات (البلدية)
08.401.01.09.	Taznakht (Mun.)	1,528	7,281	5	7,276	تازناخت (البلدية)
08.401.03.	Cercle : Amerzgane	18,814	106,426	30	106,396	دائرة : امرزكان
08.401.03.01.	Ait Zineb	1,903	10,078	29	10,049	أيت زينب
08.401.03.03.	Amerzgane	1,656	8,820	1	8,819	امرزكان
08.401.03.05.	Iznaguen	2,167	12,017	0	12,017	ازناكن
08.401.03.07.	Ighrem N'Ougdal	2,601	14,804	0	14,804	اغرم نوكدال
08.401.03.09.	Khouzama	1,416	7,488	0	7,488	خزامة
08.401.03.11.	Ouisselsate	2,519	14,196	0	14,196	وسلسات
08.401.03.13.	Siroua	1,807	9,678	0	9,678	سروا
08.401.03.15.	Telouet	2,194	14,060	0	14,060	تلوات
08.401.03.17.	Tidli	2,551	15,285	0	15,285	تيدلي
08.401.07.	Cercle : Ouarzazate	19,142	112,728	54	112,674	دائرة : ورزازات
08.401.07.01.	Ghassate	1,298	8,448	0	8,448	غسات
08.401.07.03.	Idelsane	1,415	8,374	0	8,374	ادلسان
08.401.07.05.	Imi N'Oulaoune	3,126	21,061	1	21,060	امي نولاون
08.401.07.07.	Skoura Ahl El Oust	4,035	24,055	17	24,038	سكورة أهل الوسط
08.401.07.07.3.	Dont Centre: Skoura	900	4,332	3	4,329	مركز: سكورة
08.401.07.09.	Tarmigt	7,495	40,184	36	40,148	ترميكت
08.401.07.09.3.	Dont Centre: Tabounte	5,829	31,072	24	31,048	مركز: تبونت
08.401.07.11.	Toundoute	1,773	10,606	0	10,606	توندوت
08.577.	Province: Tinghir	49,990	322,412	111	322,301	إقليم: تنغير
08.577.01.03.	Boumalne Dades (Mun.)	2,294	12,328	6	12,322	بو مالن دادس (البلدية)
08.577.01.05.	Kalaat M'Gouna (Mun.)	3,171	16,956	6	16,950	قلعة مكونة (البلدية)
08.577.01.11.	Tinghir (Mun.)	7,904	42,044	55	41,989	تنغير (البلدية)
08.577.02.	Cercle : Alnif	5,305	42,639	5	42,634	دائرة : النيف
08.577.02.05.	Alnif	2,925	22,724	0	22,724	النيف
08.577.02.05.3.	Dont Centre: Alnif	672	4,728	0	4,728	مركز: النيف
08.577.02.11.	H'Ssyia	1,602	13,741	5	13,736	حصيا
08.577.02.21.	M'Ssici	778	6,174	0	6,174	مصيسي
08.577.03.	Cercle : Assoul	3,099	17,752	3	17,749	دائرة : أسول
08.577.03.01.	Ait Hani	1,738	10,587	2	10,585	أيت هاني
08.577.03.05.	Assoul	1,361	7,165	1	7,164	اسول
08.577.05.	Cercle : Boumalne Dades	19,693	133,689	7	133,682	دائرة : بو مالن دادس
08.577.05.03.	Ait Ouassif	1,134	8,246	3	8,243	أيت واسيف
08.577.05.05.	Ait Sedrate JbelEl Oulia	800	5,031	0	5,031	أيت سدرات الجبل العليا
08.577.05.07.	Ait Sedrate JbelEL Soufla	798	5,273	2	5,271	أيت سدرات الجبل السفلى
08.577.05.09.	Ait Sedrate Sahl Charkia	2,369	15,349	0	15,349	أيت سدرات السهل الشرقية
08.577.05.11.	Ait Sedrate Sahl El Gharbia	2,856	17,392	0	17,392	أيت سدرات السهل الغربية
08.577.05.13.	Ait Youl	690	4,870	2	4,868	أيت يول
08.577.05.15.	Ighil N'Oumgoun	3,093	22,010	0	22,010	اغيل نومكون
08.577.05.17.	Ikniouen	2,051	18,235	0	18,235	اكنيون
08.577.05.21.	M'Semrir	1,218	8,866	0	8,866	امسمرير
08.577.05.25.	Souk Lakhmis Dades	2,818	17,045	0	17,045	سوق الخميس دادس
08.577.05.29.	Tilmi	1,866	11,372	0	11,372	تلمي
08.577.07.	Cercle : Tinghir	8,524	57,004	29	56,975	دائرة : تنغير
08.577.07.01.	Ait El Farsi	751	5,754	19	5,735	أيت الفرسي
08.577.07.19.	Imider	627	4,420	0	4,420	اميضر
08.577.07.23.	Ouaklim	1,548	11,338	0	11,338	واكليم
08.577.07.27.	Taghzoute N'Ait Atta	2,330	14,669	1	14,668	تغزوت نايت عطى
08.577.07.31.	Toudgha El Oulia	1,010	5,476	8	5,468	تودغى العليا
08.577.07.33.	Toudgha Essoufla	2,258	15,347	1	15,346	تودغى السفلى
08.587.	Province: Zagora	38,067	307,306	122	307,184	إقليم: زاكورة
08.587.01.01.	Agdz (Mun.)	1,865	10,681	14	10,667	اكدز (البلدية)
08.587.01.13.	Zagora (Mun.)	6,332	40,067	39	40,028	زاكورة (البلدية)
08.587.03.	Cercle : Agdz	13,442	109,391	64	109,327	دائرة : اكدز
08.587.03.01.	Afella N'Dra	951	7,203	0	7,203	افلاندرا
08.587.03.03.	Afra	1,148	8,939	0	8,939	افرا
08.587.03.05.	Ait Boudaoud	691	5,439	0	5,439	أيت بوداود
08.587.03.07.	Ait Ouallal	1,360	11,224	1	11,223	أيت ولال
08.587.03.21.	Mezguita	970	8,451	1	8,450	مزكيطة
08.587.03.25.	N'Kob	1,113	7,209	30	7,179	انقوب
08.587.03.27.	Oulad Yahia Lagraire	1,180	12,019	0	12,019	أولاد يحيى لكراير
08.587.03.31.	Taghbalte	1,087	10,054	1	10,053	تغبالت
08.587.03.37.	Tamezmoute	1,366	11,697	26	11,671	تامزموت
08.587.03.39.	Tansifte	1,672	11,987	4	11,983	تانسيفت
08.587.03.41.	Tazarine	1,904	15,169	1	15,168	تازارين
08.587.07.	Cercle : Tinzouline	8,850	82,534	2	82,532	دائرة : تنزولين
08.587.07.09.	Bleida	496	4,629	0	4,629	ابليدة
08.587.07.11.	Bni Zoli	1,940	18,941	2	18,939	بني زولي
08.587.07.13.	Bouzeroual	1,162	11,166	0	11,166	بوزروال
08.587.07.15.	Errouha	1,063	10,523	0	10,523	الروحا
08.587.07.29.	Taftechna	615	5,258	0	5,258	تافتشنا
08.587.07.43.	Ternata	1,821	16,512	0	16,512	ترناتة
08.587.07.45.	Tinzouline	1,753	15,505	0	15,505	تينزولين
08.587.09.	Cercle : Zagora	7,578	64,633	3	64,630	دائرة : زاكورة
08.587.09.17.	Fezouata	864	9,416	1	9,415	فزواطة
08.587.09.19.	Ktaoua	1,082	8,921	0	8,921	كتاوة
08.587.09.23.	M'Hamid El Ghizlane	1,052	7,590	0	7,590	امحاميد الغزلان
08.587.09.33.	Tagounite	2,262	17,103	2	17,101	تاكونيت
08.587.09.35.	Tamegroute	2,318	21,603	0	21,603	تامكروت
09.	Souss-Massa	601,511	2,676,847	4,914	2,671,933	سوس - ماسة
09.001.	Préfecture: Agadir-Ida -Ou-Tanane	143,752	600,599	3,708	596,891	عمالة: أكادير إدا وتنان
09.001.01.01.	Agadir (Mun.)	105,057	421,844	3,426	418,418	اكادير (البلدية)
09.001.05.	Cercle : Agadir Banlieue	18,227	83,323	50	83,273	دائرة : أحواز أكادير
09.001.05.01.	Amskroud	2,031	9,351	1	9,350	امسكروض
09.001.05.09.	Drargua	15,486	70,793	49	70,744	الدراركة
09.001.05.09.3.	Dont Centre: Drargua	11,136	50,946	32	50,914	مركز: الدراركة
09.001.05.11.	Idmine	710	3,179	0	3,179	اضمين
09.001.07.	Cercle : Agadir Atlantique	20,468	95,432	232	95,200	دائرة : أكادير الأطلسية
09.001.07.03.	Aourir	8,292	36,948	179	36,769	أورير
09.001.07.03.3.	Dont Centre: Aourir	7,914	35,365	173	35,192	مركز: أورير
09.001.07.05.	Aqesri	907	4,128	5	4,123	اقصري
09.001.07.07.	Aziar	660	2,948	0	2,948	ازيار
09.001.07.13.	Imouzzer	1,110	5,402	0	5,402	ايموزار
09.001.07.15.	Imsouane	1,902	8,866	1	8,865	امسوان
09.001.07.21.	Tadrart	936	4,530	0	4,530	تدرارت
09.001.07.23.	Taghazout	1,282	5,260	27	5,233	تاغزوت
09.001.07.25.	Tamri	3,663	18,577	20	18,557	تامري
09.001.07.29.	Tiqqi	1,716	8,773	0	8,773	تقي
09.163.	Province: Chtouka- Ait Baha	88,732	371,102	211	370,891	إقليم: شتوكة آيت باها
09.163.01.03.	Ait Baha (Mun.)	1,346	5,668	1	5,667	أيت باها (البلدية)
09.163.01.11.	Biougra (Mun.)	9,476	37,933	32	37,901	بيوكرة (البلدية)
09.163.03.	Cercle : Ait Baha	10,240	41,489	0	41,489	دائرة : أيت باها
09.163.03.05.	Ait Mzal	905	3,814	0	3,814	أيت مزال
09.163.03.07.	Ait Ouadrim	1,377	5,817	0	5,817	أيت وادريم
09.163.03.09.	Aouguenz	1,207	4,801	0	4,801	أو كنز
09.163.03.13.	Hilala	659	2,684	0	2,684	هلالة
09.163.03.15.	Ida Ougnidif	678	2,149	0	2,149	إدا وكنظيف
09.163.03.25.	Sidi AbdallahEl Bouchouari	1,764	8,128	0	8,128	سيدي عبد الله البوشواري
09.163.03.33.	Tanalt	847	2,744	0	2,744	تنالت
09.163.03.35.	Targua Ntouchka	1,184	4,877	0	4,877	تاركة نتوشكا
09.163.03.37.	Tassegdelt	1,204	5,107	0	5,107	تسكدلت
09.163.03.39.	Tizi Ntakoucht	415	1,368	0	1,368	تزي نتكوشت
09.163.05.	Cercle : Belfaa- Massa	22,310	93,541	85	93,456	دائرة : بلفاع ماسة
09.163.05.03.	Ait Milk	2,402	10,370	1	10,369	أيت ميلك
09.163.05.11.	Belfaa	6,584	27,699	18	27,681	بلفاع
09.163.05.11.3.	Dont Centre: Belfaa	1,189	4,750	4	4,746	مركز: بلفاع
09.163.05.19.	Inchaden	7,117	28,806	23	28,783	انشادن
09.163.05.21.	Massa	4,067	17,579	17	17,562	ماسة
09.163.05.21.3.	Dont Centre: Massa	2,469	10,458	14	10,444	مركز: ماسة
09.163.05.31.	Sidi Ouassay	2,140	9,087	26	9,061	سيدي وساي
09.163.07.	Cercle : Biougra	45,360	192,471	93	192,378	دائرة : بيوكرة
09.163.07.01.	Ait Amira	18,576	76,646	14	76,632	أيت عميرة
09.163.07.01.3.	Dont Centre: Ait Amira	11,835	48,560	4	48,556	مركز: ايت عميرة
09.163.07.17.	Imi Mqourn	2,394	10,748	0	10,748	امي مقورن
09.163.07.23.	Ouad Essafa	12,873	56,547	25	56,522	واد الصفا
09.163.07.27.	Sidi Bibi	9,278	39,042	53	38,989	سيدي بيبي
09.163.07.27.3.	Dont Centre: Sidi Bibi	1,495	6,162	28	6,134	مركز: سيدي بيبي
09.163.07.29.	Sidi Boushab	2,239	9,488	1	9,487	سيدي بو السحاب
09.273.	Préfecture: Inezgane- Ait Melloul	124,340	541,118	430	540,688	عمالة: إنزكان ايت ملول
09.273.01.05.	Ait Melloul (Mun.)	39,697	171,847	129	171,718	أيت ملول (البلدية)
09.273.01.13.	Dcheira El Jihadia (Mun.)	24,528	100,336	72	100,264	الدشيرة الجهادية (البلدية)
09.273.01.15.	Inezgane (Mun.)	29,723	130,333	141	130,192	انزكان (البلدية)
09.273.01.17.	Lqliaa (Mun.)	18,127	83,235	74	83,161	القليعة (البلدية)
09.273.05.	Cercle : Ait Melloul	12,265	55,367	14	55,353	دائرة : أيت ملول
09.273.05.19.	Oulad Dahou	3,169	14,587	4	14,583	اولاد دحو
09.273.05.27.	Temsia	9,096	40,780	10	40,770	تمسية
09.273.05.27.3.	Dont Centre: Temsia	6,222	27,955	5	27,950	مركز: تمسية
09.541.	Province: Taroudannt	171,186	838,820	335	838,485	إقليم: تارودانت
09.541.01.01.	Ait Iaaza (Mun.)	3,126	14,259	2	14,257	أيت ايعزة (البلدية)
09.541.01.02.	Aoulouz (Mun.)	3,633	17,409	2	17,407	أولوز (البلدية)
09.541.01.03.	El Guerdane (Mun.)	2,674	12,313	3	12,310	الكردان (البلدية)
09.541.01.05.	Irherm (Mun.)	1,002	4,108	0	4,108	ايغرم (البلدية)
09.541.01.07.	Oulad Berhil (Mun.)	5,041	24,288	3	24,285	أولاد برحيل (البلدية)
09.541.01.09.	Oulad Teima (Mun.)	19,652	89,387	24	89,363	أولاد تايمة (البلدية)
09.541.01.11.	Taliouine (Mun.)	1,489	6,727	7	6,720	تالوين (البلدية)
09.541.01.13.	Taroudannt (Mun.)	18,788	80,149	103	80,046	تارودانت (البلدية)
09.541.03.	Cercle : Irherm	10,901	42,031	1	42,030	دائرة : ايغرم
09.541.03.01.	Adar	1,147	4,344	0	4,344	ادار
09.541.03.03.	Ait Abdallah	643	2,086	0	2,086	أيت عبد الله
09.541.03.05.	Amalou	803	3,256	0	3,256	املو
09.541.03.07.	Azaghar N'Irs	1,086	4,748	0	4,748	ازغارنيرس
09.541.03.09.	Imaouen	622	2,466	0	2,466	ايماون
09.541.03.11.	Imi N'Tayart	388	1,164	0	1,164	امي نتايارت
09.541.03.13.	Nihit	514	1,883	0	1,883	نيحيت
09.541.03.15.	Oualqadi	601	2,146	0	2,146	والقاضي
09.541.03.17.	Sidi Boaal	774	3,019	0	3,019	سيدي بوعل
09.541.03.19.	Sidi Mzal	517	1,701	0	1,701	سيدي امزال
09.541.03.21.	Tabia	388	1,460	0	1,460	تابية
09.541.03.23.	Tataoute	1,140	4,743	0	4,743	تتاوت
09.541.03.25.	Tindine	739	2,932	0	2,932	تيندين
09.541.03.27.	Tisfane	532	2,338	0	2,338	تيسفان
09.541.03.29.	Toufelaazt	402	1,614	1	1,613	توفلعازت
09.541.03.31.	Toumliline	605	2,131	0	2,131	تومليلين
09.541.04.	Cercle : Oulad Berhil	24,883	132,478	8	132,470	دائرة : أولاد برحيل
09.541.04.09.	Arazane	1,422	7,999	1	7,998	ارزان
09.541.04.13.	El Faid	2,177	12,011	0	12,011	الفيض
09.541.04.17.	Ida Ou Gailal	1,145	6,436	0	6,436	ادا وكيلال
09.541.04.21.	Ida Ougoummad	1,546	7,880	0	7,880	ادا وكماض
09.541.04.23.	Igli	2,076	11,197	1	11,196	اكلي
09.541.04.25.	Igoudar Mnabha	1,793	8,767	0	8,767	إيكودار منابهة
09.541.04.29.	Lamhara	2,073	11,374	3	11,371	لمهارة
09.541.04.33.	Oulad Aissa	2,364	12,331	1	12,330	أولاد عيسى
09.541.04.35.	Ouneine	1,486	7,866	2	7,864	اوناين
09.541.04.39.	Sidi Abdellah Ou Said	662	3,463	0	3,463	سيدي عبد الله أو سعيد
09.541.04.47.	Sidi Ouaaziz	1,595	8,320	0	8,320	سيدي واعزيز
09.541.04.49.	Tafingoult	1,217	6,635	0	6,635	تافنكولت
09.541.04.53.	Talgjount	995	5,816	0	5,816	تالكجونت
09.541.04.59.	Tigouga	756	4,553	0	4,553	تيكوكة
09.541.04.61.	Tinzart	1,105	5,902	0	5,902	تينزرت
09.541.04.67.	Tizi N'Test	945	5,182	0	5,182	تيزي نتاست
09.541.04.69.	Toughmart	1,526	6,746	0	6,746	توغمرت
09.541.05.	Cercle : Oulad Teima	35,089	179,400	119	179,281	دائرة : أولاد تايمة
09.541.05.01.	Ahl Ramel	1,615	8,132	1	8,131	أهل الرمل
09.541.05.03.	Argana	978	4,804	0	4,804	اركانة
09.541.05.05.	Assads	968	4,650	0	4,650	اصادص
09.541.05.07.	Bigoudine	1,021	5,131	0	5,131	بيكودين
09.541.05.09.	Eddir	1,347	7,565	3	7,562	الدير
09.541.05.11.	El Koudia El Beida	4,132	21,875	6	21,869	الكدية البيضاء
09.541.05.13.	Imilmaiss	1,195	6,584	0	6,584	اميلمايس
09.541.05.15.	Issen	2,448	12,119	91	12,028	اسن
09.541.05.17.	Lagfifat	3,554	18,811	1	18,810	لكفيفات
09.541.05.19.	Lakhnafif	1,986	9,936	1	9,935	الخنانيف
09.541.05.21.	Lamhadi	2,250	11,135	0	11,135	لمهادي
09.541.05.23.	Machraa El Ain	2,391	11,378	5	11,373	مشرع العين
09.541.05.25.	Sidi Ahmed Ou Amar	3,103	15,982	2	15,980	سيدي أحمد أو عمرو
09.541.05.27.	Sidi Boumoussa	3,557	16,894	4	16,890	سيدي بوموسى
09.541.05.29.	Sidi Moussa Lhamri	2,631	14,976	3	14,973	سيدي موسى الحمري
09.541.05.31.	Talmakante	771	4,004	0	4,004	تالمكانت
09.541.05.33.	Tidsi Nissendalene	1,142	5,424	2	5,422	تدسي نيسدلان
09.541.07.	Cercle : Taliouine	20,022	110,304	2	110,302	دائرة : تالوين
09.541.07.01.	Agadir Melloul	1,550	8,848	0	8,848	اكادير ملول
09.541.07.03.	Ahl Tifnoute	1,044	5,910	1	5,909	أهل تفنوت
09.541.07.05.	Askaouen	1,306	7,458	0	7,458	اسكاون
09.541.07.07.	Assaisse	1,355	6,838	0	6,838	اسايس
09.541.07.09.	Assaki	1,616	8,175	0	8,175	اساكي
09.541.07.11.	Azrar	930	5,038	0	5,038	ازرار
09.541.07.13.	Iguidi	1,527	9,100	0	9,100	ايكيدي
09.541.07.15.	Sidi Hsaine	1,391	7,418	1	7,417	سيدي احساين
09.541.07.17.	Taouyalte	1,370	7,465	0	7,465	تاويالت
09.541.07.19.	Tassousfi	1,390	6,724	0	6,724	تسوسفي
09.541.07.21.	Tizgzaouine	1,107	5,272	0	5,272	تيزكزاوين
09.541.07.23.	Toubkal	1,464	8,489	0	8,489	توبقال
09.541.07.25.	Zagmouzen	1,406	8,221	0	8,221	زكموزن
09.541.07.37.	Ouzioua	1,425	7,692	0	7,692	اوزيوة
09.541.07.65.	Tisrasse	1,141	7,656	0	7,656	تيسراس
09.541.09.	Cercle : Taroudannt	24,886	125,967	61	125,906	دائرة : تارودانت
09.541.09.01.	Ahmar Laglalcha	3,616	17,950	15	17,935	احمر لكلالشة
09.541.09.03.	Ait Igas	1,638	10,256	0	10,256	أيت ايكاس
09.541.09.05.	Ait Makhlouf	989	4,752	6	4,746	أيت مخلوف
09.541.09.11.	Bounrar	1,283	6,304	0	6,304	بونرار
09.541.09.15.	Freija	1,553	8,792	3	8,789	افريجة
09.541.09.19.	Ida Ou Moumen	1,211	6,105	0	6,105	إد او مومن
09.541.09.27.	Imoulass	1,677	8,388	1	8,387	ايمولاس
09.541.09.31.	Lamnizla	796	4,224	0	4,224	لمنيزلة
09.541.09.41.	Sidi Ahmed Ou Abdallah	911	3,833	0	3,833	سيدي أحمد أو عبد الله
09.541.09.43.	Sidi Borja	1,963	10,000	11	9,989	سيدي بورجا
09.541.09.45.	Sidi Dahmane	2,427	11,955	0	11,955	سيدي دحمان
09.541.09.51.	Tafraouten	1,610	7,999	0	7,999	تافراوتن
09.541.09.55.	Tamaloukte	1,001	4,739	1	4,738	تملوكت
09.541.09.57.	Tazemmourt	1,238	6,073	0	6,073	تزمورت
09.541.09.63.	Tiout	664	2,920	4	2,916	تيوت
09.541.09.71.	Zaouia Sidi Tahar	2,309	11,677	20	11,657	زاوية سيدي الطاهر
09.551.	Province: Tata	22,359	117,841	32	117,809	إقليم: طاطا
09.551.01.01.	Akka (Mun.)	1,295	6,870	0	6,870	اقا (البلدية)
09.551.01.03.	Fam El Hisn (Mun.)	1,300	6,353	2	6,351	فم الحصن (البلدية)
09.551.01.05.	Foum Zguid (Mun.)	1,674	8,986	10	8,976	فم زكيد (البلدية)
09.551.01.07.	Tata (Mun.)	3,723	18,611	12	18,599	طاطا (البلدية)
09.551.03.	Cercle : Akka	3,553	16,914	2	16,912	دائرة : أقا
09.551.03.01.	Ait Ouabelli	473	2,401	0	2,401	أيت وابلي
09.551.03.03.	Kasbat Sidi Abdellah Ben M'Barek	1,146	6,196	1	6,195	قصبة سيدي عبد الله بن امبارك
09.551.03.05.	Tamanarte	1,483	6,198	1	6,197	تمنارت
09.551.03.07.	Tizounine	451	2,119	0	2,119	تيزونين
09.551.05.	Cercle : Foum Zguid	5,578	34,350	3	34,347	دائرة : فم زكيد
09.551.05.01.	Aguinane	549	2,801	0	2,801	اكينان
09.551.05.03.	Akka Ighane	1,141	6,452	2	6,450	اقا ايغان
09.551.05.05.	Allougoum	1,186	8,418	0	8,418	الوكوم
09.551.05.07.	Ibn Yacoub	540	2,919	0	2,919	ابن يعقوب
09.551.05.09.	Tissint	1,385	9,434	1	9,433	تيسينت
09.551.05.11.	Tlite	777	4,326	0	4,326	أتليت
09.551.07.	Cercle : Tata	5,236	25,757	3	25,754	دائرة : طاطا
09.551.07.01.	Adis	940	6,511	0	6,511	اديس
09.551.07.03.	Issafen	914	3,459	2	3,457	ايسافن
09.551.07.05.	Oum El Guerdane	553	3,370	0	3,370	أم الكردان
09.551.07.07.	Tagmout	1,090	4,581	0	4,581	تكموت
09.551.07.09.	Tigzmerte	778	3,916	1	3,915	تيكزمرت
09.551.07.11.	Tizaghte	961	3,920	0	3,920	تيزغت
09.581.	Province: Tiznit	51,142	207,367	198	207,169	إقليم: تيزنيت
09.581.01.05.	Tafraout (Mun.)	1,771	6,345	16	6,329	تافراوت (البلدية)
09.581.01.07.	Tiznit (Mun.)	18,420	74,699	91	74,608	تزنيت (البلدية)
09.581.03.	Cercle : Anezi	9,885	41,947	2	41,945	دائرة : انزي
09.581.03.01.	Ait Issafen	788	3,293	0	3,293	أيت ايسافن
09.581.03.03.	Anzi	1,771	7,658	1	7,657	انزي
09.581.03.05.	Arbaa Ait Ahmed	1,240	5,257	0	5,257	اربعاء أيت أحمد
09.581.03.07.	Ida Ou Gougmar	1,367	5,792	0	5,792	إد او كوكمار
09.581.03.09.	Sidi Ahmed Ou Moussa	818	3,679	0	3,679	سيدي أحمد أو موسى
09.581.03.11.	Tafraout El Mouloud	781	3,200	1	3,199	تفراوت المولود
09.581.03.13.	Tighmi	1,367	6,396	0	6,396	تيغمي
09.581.03.15.	Tizoughrane	1,247	4,769	0	4,769	تيزغران
09.581.03.17.	Tnine Aday	506	1,903	0	1,903	اثنين أداي
09.581.09.	Cercle : Tafraout	4,981	16,292	2	16,290	دائرة : تافراوت
09.581.09.01.	Afella Ighir	856	2,973	0	2,973	أفلا اغير
09.581.09.03.	Ait Ouafqa	1,182	4,210	0	4,210	أيت وافقا
09.581.09.05.	Ammelne	1,165	3,603	2	3,601	املن
09.581.09.07.	Irigh N'Tahala	503	1,577	0	1,577	ايريغ نتاهلة
09.581.09.09.	Tarsouat	770	2,375	0	2,375	تارسوات
09.581.09.11.	Tassrirt	505	1,554	0	1,554	تاسريرت
09.581.11.	Cercle : Tiznit	16,085	68,084	87	67,997	دائرة : تزنيت
09.581.11.01.	Arbaa Rasmouka	1,395	5,964	11	5,953	أربعاء رسموكة
09.581.11.03.	Arbaa Sahel	2,633	10,705	20	10,685	أربعاء الساحل
09.581.11.05.	Bounaamane	2,275	10,310	0	10,310	بونعمان
09.581.11.07.	El Maader El Kabir	1,697	6,885	1	6,884	المعدر الكبير
09.581.11.09.	Ouijjane	1,175	4,938	0	4,938	ويجان
09.581.11.11.	Reggada	2,948	13,284	8	13,276	الركادة
09.581.11.13.	Sidi Bouabdelli	1,331	5,758	0	5,758	سيدي بوعبد اللي
09.581.11.15.	Tnine Aglou	2,631	10,240	47	10,193	اثنين اكلو
10.	Guelmim-Oued Noun	90,202	433,757	347	433,410	كلميم - واد نون
10.071.	Province: Assa-Zag	5,208	44,124	4	44,120	إقليم: أسا - الزاك
10.071.01.01.	Assa (Mun.)	2,990	14,570	2	14,568	أسا (البلدية)
10.071.01.03.	Zag (Mun.)	941	12,763	0	12,763	الزاك (البلدية)
10.071.03.	Cercle : Assa	956	10,455	1	10,454	دائرة : أسا
10.071.03.01.	Aouint Lahna	314	2,391	0	2,391	عوينة لهنا
10.071.03.03.	Aouint Yghomane	470	3,042	0	3,042	عوينة يغمان
10.071.03.05.	Touizgui	172	5,022	1	5,021	تويزكي
10.071.05.	Cercle : Zag	321	6,336	1	6,335	دائرة : الزاك
10.071.05.01.	Al Mahbass	153	4,208	0	4,208	المحبس
10.071.05.03.	Labouirat	168	2,128	1	2,127	لبويرات
10.261.	Province: Guelmim	40,214	187,808	195	187,613	إقليم: كلميم
10.261.01.01.	Bouizakarne (Mun.)	3,194	14,228	0	14,228	بويز كارن (البلدية)
10.261.01.03.	Guelmim (Mun.)	25,667	118,318	143	118,175	كلميم (البلدية)
10.261.03.	Cercle : Bouizakarne	7,439	35,670	13	35,657	دائرة : بويزكارن
10.261.03.01.	Aday	669	3,005	1	3,004	اداي
10.261.03.03.	Ait Boufoulen	211	1,045	0	1,045	أيت بوفلن
10.261.03.05.	Amtdi	325	1,472	0	1,472	امتدي
10.261.03.07.	Ifrane Atlas Saghir	2,383	11,205	2	11,203	افران أطلس الصغير
10.261.03.09.	Tagante	666	3,630	6	3,624	تكانت
10.261.03.11.	Taghjijt	2,076	9,988	1	9,987	تغجيجت
10.261.03.11.3.	Dont Centre: Taghjijt	1,471	6,700	1	6,699	مركز: تغجيجت
10.261.03.13.	Timoulay	1,109	5,325	3	5,322	تمولاي
10.261.05.	Cercle : Guelmim	1,852	9,899	29	9,870	دائرة : كلميم
10.261.05.03.	Aferkat	268	1,460	0	1,460	افركات
10.261.05.05.	Asrir	708	3,566	25	3,541	اسرير
10.261.05.09.	Fask	722	3,943	4	3,939	فاصك
10.261.05.21.	Tiglit	154	930	0	930	تيكليت
10.261.07.	Cercle : Laqsabi	2,062	9,693	10	9,683	دائرة : لقصابي
10.261.07.01.	Abaynou	543	2,422	1	2,421	اباينو
10.261.07.07.	Echatea El Abied	212	1,158	0	1,158	الشاطئ الأبيض
10.261.07.11.	Labyar	96	546	0	546	لبيار
10.261.07.13.	Laqsabi Tagoust	516	2,413	0	2,413	لقصابي تاكوست
10.261.07.15.	Rass Oumlil	278	1,172	2	1,170	رأس اومليل
10.261.07.17.	Taliouine Assaka	256	1,125	6	1,119	تلوين اساكا
10.261.07.19.	Targa Wassay	161	857	1	856	تاركا وساي
10.473.	Province: Sidi Ifni	25,308	115,691	102	115,589	إقليم: سيدي افني
10.473.01.01.	Lakhsas (Mun.)	1,121	4,729	0	4,729	الاخصاص (البلدية)
10.473.01.03.	Sidi Ifni (Mun.)	5,463	21,618	29	21,589	سيدي إفني (البلدية)
10.473.05.	Cercle : Ifni	8,435	39,667	71	39,596	دائرة : إفني
10.473.05.01.	Arbaa Ait Abdellah	642	3,208	0	3,208	اربعاء أيت عبد الله
10.473.05.03.	Imi N'Fast	417	2,465	0	2,465	امي نفاست
10.473.05.05.	Mesti	636	2,931	1	2,930	مستي
10.473.05.07.	Mirleft	2,004	8,162	62	8,100	مير لفت
10.473.05.07.3.	Dont Centre: Mirleft	1,243	4,664	57	4,607	مركز: مير لفت
10.473.05.09.	Sbouya	777	3,944	1	3,943	اسبوية
10.473.05.11.	Tangarfa	970	4,706	6	4,700	تنكرفا
10.473.05.13.	Tioughza	2,257	10,577	1	10,576	تيوغزة
10.473.05.15.	Tnine Amellou	732	3,674	0	3,674	اثنين املو
10.473.07.	Cercle : Lakhsas	10,289	49,677	2	49,675	دائرة : الاخصاص
10.473.07.01.	Ait Erkha	977	5,112	0	5,112	أيت الرخا
10.473.07.03.	Anfeg	1,232	5,071	0	5,071	انفك
10.473.07.05.	Boutrouch	739	3,650	0	3,650	بوطروش
10.473.07.07.	Ibdar	1,119	5,140	0	5,140	ايبضر
10.473.07.09.	Sebt Ennabour	1,410	7,222	0	7,222	سبت النابور
10.473.07.11.	Sidi AbdallahOu Belaid	875	4,702	1	4,701	سيدي عبد الله أو بلعيد
10.473.07.13.	Sidi H'Saine Ou Ali	1,289	6,064	0	6,064	سيدي حساين أو علي
10.473.07.15.	Sidi M'Bark	1,303	6,110	1	6,109	سيدي مبارك
10.473.07.17.	Tighirt	1,345	6,606	0	6,606	تيغيرت
10.521.	Province: Tan-Tan	19,472	86,134	46	86,088	إقليم: طانطان
10.521.01.01.	Tan Tan (Mun.)	16,411	73,209	36	73,173	طانطان (البلدية)
10.521.01.03.	El Ouatia (Mun.)	2,372	9,295	10	9,285	الوطية (البلدية)
10.521.03.	Cercle : Msied	376	2,290	0	2,290	دائرة : امسيد
10.521.03.01.	Msied	194	1,275	0	1,275	امسيد
10.521.03.03.	Tilemzoun	182	1,015	0	1,015	تيلمزون
10.521.05.	Cercle : Tan Tan	313	1,340	0	1,340	دائرة : طانطان
10.521.05.01.	Abteh	69	264	0	264	ابطيح
10.521.05.03.	Ben Khlil	150	752	0	752	ابن خليل
10.521.05.05.	Chbika	94	324	0	324	اشبيكة
11.	Laayoune-Sakia El Hamra	78,754	367,758	777	366,981	العيون - الساقية الحمراء
11.121.	Province: Boujdour	10,186	50,566	72	50,494	إقليم: بوجدور
11.121.01.01.	Boujdour (Mun.)	9,511	42,651	40	42,611	بوجدور (البلدية)
11.121.03.	Cercle : Jraifia	675	7,915	32	7,883	دائرة : الجريفية
11.121.03.01.	Gueltat Zemmour	83	6,393	12	6,381	كلتة زمور
11.121.03.03.	Jraifia	352	950	4	946	الجريفية
11.121.03.05.	Lamssid	240	572	16	556	لمسيد
11.221.	Province: Es-Semara	11,614	66,014	34	65,980	إقليم: السمارة
11.221.01.01.	Es-semara (Mun.)	11,402	57,035	24	57,011	السمارة (البلدية)
11.221.03.	Cercle : Es-Semara	212	8,979	10	8,969	دائرة : السمارة
11.221.03.01.	Amgala	25	2,945	5	2,940	امكالة
11.221.03.03.	Haouza	48	5,462	0	5,462	حوزة
11.221.03.05.	Jdiriya	48	248	0	248	اجديرية
11.221.03.07.	Sidi Ahmed Laaroussi	76	269	4	265	سيدي أحمد العروسي
11.221.03.09.	Tifariti	15	55	1	54	تيفاريتي
11.321.	Province: Laâyoune	53,561	238,096	596	237,500	إقليم: العيون
11.321.01.01.	El Marsa (Mun.)	4,811	17,917	19	17,898	المرسى (البلدية)
11.321.01.03.	Laayoune (Mun.)	48,049	217,732	534	217,198	العيون (البلدية)
11.321.03.	Cercle : Laayoune	701	2,447	43	2,404	دائرة : العيون
11.321.03.01.	Boukraa	200	558	4	554	بوكراع
11.321.03.03.	Dcheira	148	509	21	488	الدشيرة
11.321.03.05.	Foum El Oued	353	1,380	18	1,362	فم الواد
11.537.	Province: Tarfaya	3,393	13,082	75	13,007	إقليم: طرفاية
11.537.01.05.	Tarfaya (Mun.)	2,092	8,027	62	7,965	طرفاية (البلدية)
11.537.03.	Cercle : Daoura -el Hagounia	325	1,259	0	1,259	دائرة : الدورة الحكونية
11.537.03.03.	Daoura	297	1,108	0	1,108	دورة
11.537.03.05.	El Hagounia	28	151	0	151	الحكونية
11.537.05.	Cercle : Tarfaya	976	3,796	13	3,783	دائرة : طرفاية
11.537.05.01.	Akhfennir	610	2,280	9	2,271	اخفنير
11.537.05.07.	Tah	366	1,516	4	1,512	طاح
12.	Eddakhla-Oued Eddahab	29,385	142,955	888	142,067	الداخلة - وادي الذهب
12.066.	Province: Aousserd	776	16,190	180	16,010	إقليم: أوسرد
12.066.01.03.	Lagouira (Mun.)	pm	pm	pm	pm	الكويرة (البلدية)
12.066.03.	Cercle : Aousserd	168	11,565	116	11,449	دائرة : أوسرد
12.066.03.03.	Aghouinite	pm	pm	pm	pm	اغونيت
12.066.03.05.	Aousserd	154	5,822	97	5,725	أوسرد
12.066.03.07.	Tichla	14	5,743	19	5,724	تشلا
12.066.03.09.	Zoug	pm	pm	pm	pm	زوك
12.066.05.	Cercle : Bir Gandouz	608	4,625	64	4,561	دائرة : بئر كندوز
12.066.05.03.	Bir Gandouz	608	4,625	64	4,561	بئر كندوز
12.391.	Province: Oued Ed-Dahab	28,609	126,765	708	126,057	إقليم: وادي الذهب
12.391.01.01.	Dakhla (Mun.)	25,469	106,277	553	105,724	الداخلة (البلدية)
12.391.05.	Cercle : Bir Anzarane	259	11,580	28	11,552	دائرة : بئر انزران
12.391.05.01.	Bir Anzarane	234	6,244	16	6,228	بئر انزران
12.391.05.03.	Gleibat El Foula	18	2,190	12	2,178	اكليبات الفولة
12.391.05.05.	Mijik	pm	pm	pm	pm	مجيك
12.391.05.07.	Oum Dreyga	7	3,146	0	3,146	أم ادريكة
12.391.09.	Cercle : El Argoub	2,881	8,908	127	8,781	دائرة : العركوب
12.391.09.01.	El Argoub	1,964	5,759	42	5,717	العركوب
12.391.09.03.	Imlili	917	3,149	85	3,064	امليلي
Total	Total Royaume du Maroc	7,313,806	33,848,242	86,206	33,762,036	مجموع المملكة المغربية
