= 2025–26 Moroccan Women's Championship D1 =

24th season of top Moroccan women's football league

Moroccan Division 1 Féminine
- Season: 2025–26
- Dates: 14 September 2025 – 17 May 2026
- Champions: AS FAR (13th title)
- Relegated: Lionnes Assa-Mahbès; Itihad Tanger
- Champions League: AS FAR
- UNAF Qualifying tournament: Fath US
- Matches: 132
- Goals: 437 (3.31 per match)
- Top goalscorer: Nadia Laftah (WAC) (26 goals)
- Biggest home win: AS FAR 9–0 Itihad Tanger (7 February 2026); Wydad AC 9–0 Raja Aït Iazza (3 May 2026)
- Biggest away win: Raja Aït Iazza 0–8 AS FAR (21 April 2026)
- Highest scoring: US Touarga 8–2 Lionnes Assa-Mahbès (3 May 2026)
- Longest winning run: 10 matches AS FAR, Wydad AC
- Longest unbeaten run: 20 matches AS FAR
- Longest winless run: 14 matches Lionnes Assa-Mahbès
- Longest losing run: 13 matches Itihad Tanger

The 2025–26 National Professional Women's Football Championship Division 1, was the 24th season of the top national division of women's football in Morocco.

== Teams ==
Location of teams in 2025–26 Moroccan Women's Championship
Location of the Western Sahara-based team in 2025–26 Moroccan Women's Championship

As part of a broader development strategy, the league has reduced the number of participating teams to 12, down from 14, for the first time since it was restructured into a single-group format in 2019.

=== Promotion and relegation (pre-season) ===
Out of the 12 participating teams, 10 were maintained from last season, while the other two were promoted after topping the North and South groups of the second division, replacing the four teams that were relegated.

Entering league	Exiting league
Promoted from 2024–2025 Division 2	Relegated from 2024–25 Division 1
Union Touarga; Lionnes Assa-Mahbès	RCA Zemamra; Raja Aïn Harrouda; CSS Temara; SCC Mohammédia

=== Clubs, stadiums and personnel ===
Team	Acronym	Location	Head coach	Home ground	Capacity	2024–25 season
AM Laâyoune	AMLFF	Laayoune	(Morocco) Mehdi Bouabidi	Sheikh Mohamed Laghdaf Stadium	15,000	5th
AS FAR	ASFAR	Rabat	(Morocco) Mohamed Amine Alioua	AS FAR Training Center		1st
CS Hilal Temara	HST	Temara	(Morocco) Abid Oubenaissa	Témara Municipal Stadium	5,000	7th
Fath US	FUS	Rabat	(Morocco) Mehdi El Qaichouri	FUS Rabat Training Center		4th
Itihad Tanger	ITFF	Tangier	(Morocco) Azzedine Khattaf	TBC		8th
Lionnes Assa-Mahbès	ALAMFF	Assa	(Morocco) Samira Louguid	Moulay Ismail Municipal Stadium		D2, 2nd
Phoenix Marrakech	PFAM	Marrakesh	(Morocco) Adil M'Ghafri	Hay Mohammadi Daoudiate Stadium		9th
Raja Aït Iazza	ARAFF	Ait Iaaza	(Morocco) Kamal Taouile	Aït Iaaza Municipal Stadium		10th
RS Berkane	RSB	Berkane	(France) Christophe Capian	RS Berkane Training Center		2nd
SC Casablanca	SCC	Casablanca	(South Africa) Jerry Tshabalala	Larbi Zaouli Stadium	18,600	3rd
Wydad AC	WAC	Casablanca	(Morocco) Abdeslam Tahir	Mohamed Benjelloun Complex	5,000	6th
US Touagra	UTS	Rabat	(Guinea) Amara Condé	Stade les Chênes		D2, 1st

=== Foreign players ===
Club	Player 1	Player 2	Player 3	Former player(s)
ALAMFF	(Democratic Republic of the Congo) Feza Kalombo (Note: Played the first half of the championship with Raja Ait Iazza)	(Ghana) Joyce Asamoah	(Ghana) Akosua Agyeiwah	(Togo) Alice Gbati
AMLFF	(Benin) Germaine Honfo	(Ghana) Precious Nyarko	(Mauritania) Ramata Gangué	
ARAFF	(Republic of the Congo) Chimène Ngazue	(France) Léocade Bailly	(Ghana) Sarah Inkoom	
ASFAR	(Benin) Yolande Gnammi	(Republic of the Congo) Paulmiche Mahouna	(Republic of the Congo) Flore Ngoma	
FUS	(Guinea) Aminata Camara	(Mali) Salimata Diarra	(Togo) Odette Gnintegma	(Gabon) Amira Nzé
HST	(Cameroon) Bernadette Meyegue	(Cameroon) Julie Nke	(Equatorial Guinea) Mari Cruz Ebula	
ITFF	(Cameroon) Liliane Moutapam	(Democratic Republic of the Congo) Dorcas Masanga		
PFAM	(Cameroon) Berthe Abega	(Malawi) Sabinah Thom	(South Africa) Lebogang Mabatle	(Burundi) Joëlle Bukuru
RSB	(Algeria) Leïla El Hadj	(Ethiopia) Ariet Odong	(Nigeria) Racheal Kolawole	
SCC	(Equatorial Guinea) Lynda Mendoua	(Ivory Coast) Sylviane Kokora	(Nigeria) Mercy Itimi	(Nigeria) Anuoluwapo Salisu
UST	(France) Dialamba Diaby	(Ivory Coast) Nadège Koffi	(Mauritania) Fatou Diop	(Burkina Faso) Fatoumata Tamboura
WAC	(Comoros) Assimina Maoulida	(Senegal) Wolimata Ndiaye	(Senegal) Adama Sané	

== League table ==
Pos	Team	Pld	W	D	L	GF	GA	GD	Pts	Qualification or relegation
1	AS FAR (C)	22	19	2	1	77	8	+69	59	Qualification for the 2026 CAF Champions League
2	Fath US	22	17	2	3	50	15	+35	53	Qualification for the 2026 Champions League UNAF Qualifiers
3	Wydad AC	22	17	1	4	60	22	+38	52	
4	RS Berkane	22	11	7	4	43	22	+21	40	
5	US Touarga	22	12	3	7	44	27	+17	39	
6	AM Laâyoune	22	10	6	6	41	26	+15	36	
7	SC Casablanca	22	8	7	7	37	27	+10	31	
8	CS Hilal Temara (Note: Hilal Temara were deducted one point for fielding an ineligible player in their match against SCC on 6 February 2026.)	22	6	1	15	27	41	−14	18	
9	Phoenix Marrakech	22	5	3	14	22	50	−28	18	
10	Raja Ait Iazza	22	5	2	15	19	55	−36	17	
11	Lionnes Assa-Mahbès (R)	22	1	4	17	15	71	−56	7	Relegation to 2026–27 Moroccan Women's Division 2
12	Itihad Tanger (R)	22	1	2	19	5	76	−71	5	Relegation to 2026–27 Moroccan Women's Division 2

Source: FRMF
Rules for classification: 1) Points; 2) Head-to-head points; 3) Goal difference; 4) Number of goals scored
(C) Champions; (R) Relegated

== Results ==
Home \ Away	LAM	AML	RAI	FAR	FUS	HST	ITF	PFM	RSB	SCC	UTS	WAC
Lionnes Assa-Mahbès	—	1–1	1–3	0–4	1–3	1–1	2–2	0–1	0–5	1–7	0–3	1–4
AMFF Laâyoune	1–1	—	3–1	0–1	1–0	3–2	4–0	4–1	2–2	0–0	2–0	1–1
Raja Ait Iazza	1–0	0–1	—	0–8	1–4	3–2	2–1	1–3	0–1	0–4	0–1	0–2
AS FAR	6–0	3–1	1–1	—	0–1	2–1	9–0	8–0	2–2	3–0	2–0	5–0
Fath US	4–0	2–1	3–1	1–4	—	1–0	8–0	3–0	0–0	3–0	1–0	2–3
CS Hilal Temara	3–1	3–2	0–1	0–4	0–1	—	4–0	4–0	1–5	1–2	1–2	0–2
Itihad Tanger	0–2	0–7	0–0	0–3	0–3	0–1	—	1–0	0–3	0–2	0–4	0–3
Phoenix Marrakech	1–0	1–2	1–0	0–4	1–4	2–3	4–0	—	1–1	2–2	0–2	1–2
RS Berkane	3–0	2–0	1–1	1–2	2–3	2–0	3–1	2–1	—	4–3	0–0	0–1
SC Casablanca	3–1	1–1	3–0	0–3	0–0	3–0 (Note: Hilal Temara forfeited the match for fielding an ineligible player, Amal El Aoufi. The match had originally ended in a 1–1 draw.)	2–0	1–1	0–0	—	1–1	1–2
US Touarga	8–2	2–4	4–3	0–1	0–1	1–0	4–0	4–0	1–1	2–1	—	1–3
Wydad AC	7–0	2–0	9–0	0–1	0–2	3–0	6–0	2–1	3–1	2–1	3–4	—

Source: FRMF
Legend: Blue = home team win; Yellow = draw; Red = away team win.

== Season statistics ==
=== Scoring ===
- First goal of the season:
  - (Morocco) Samia Fikri (FUS) against SCC (13 September 2025)
- Last goal of the season:
  - (Morocco) Imène El Ghazouani (FUS) against ALAMFF (17 May 2026)

=== Top goalscorers ===
Rank	Player	Club	Goals
1	(Morocco) Nadia Laftah	WAC	26
2	(Morocco) Sanaâ Mssoudy	ASFAR	24
3	(Morocco) Chaymaa Mourtaji	UTS	17
4	(Morocco) Salma Tammar	SCC	14
5	(Mali) Salimata Diarra	FUS	13
6	(Benin) Yolande Gnammi	ASFAR	10
6	(Morocco) Salma Bouguerch	FUS	10
8	(Morocco) Chaimae Drissi	RSB	9
9	(Morocco) Salma Amani	WAC	8
9	(Morocco) Hajar Jbilou	WAC	8
9	(Morocco) Ranya Senhaji	RSB	8

=== Hat-tricks ===
Player	For	Against	Result	Date	Round
(Benin) Yolande Gnammi	ASFAR	ALAMFF	4–0 (A)	17 October 2025	6
(Mali) Salimata Diarra	FUS	ITFF	8–0 (H)	8 November 2025	8
(Morocco) Chaimae Drissi	RSB	ALAMFF	3–0 (H)	14 December 2025	10
(Morocco) Chaymaa Mourtaji	UTS	WAC	4–3 (A)	1 February 2026	13
(Morocco) Sanaâ Mssoudy^{7}	ASFAR	ITFF	9–0 (H)	7 February 2026	14
(Morocco) Sanaâ Mssoudy	ASFAR	SCC	3–0 (A)	21 February 2026	15
(Benin) Yolande Gnammi	ASFAR	ARAFF	0–8 (A)	21 April 2026	18
(Morocco) Nadia Laftah^{4}	WAC	ITFF	6–0 (H)	21 April 2026	18
(Morocco) Chaymaa Mourtaji^{5}	UTS	ALAMFF	8–2 (H)	3 May 2026	20
(Morocco) Nadia Laftah^{5}	WAC	ARAFF	9–0 (H)	3 May 2026	20
(Morocco) Anissa Belkasmi	RSB	ALAMFF	5–0 (A)	9 May 2026	21

- ^{4} – Player scored four goals.
- ^{5} – Player scored five goals.
- ^{7} – Player scored seven goals.

=== Most clean sheets ===
Rank	Player	Club	Clean sheets
1	(Morocco) Hasnae Ouhatte	FUS	11
2	(Morocco) Khadija Er-Rmichi	ASFAR	10
3	(Morocco) Imane Abdelahad	WAC	8
4	(Morocco) Hind Hasnaoui	ASFAR	6
4	(Morocco) Chaimae Aasem	UTS	6
6	(Morocco) Fatima Zahra Bambara	SCC	5
6	(Morocco) Zineb El Arari	RSB	5
8	(Morocco) Chaimae Ibnoulouadid	AMLFF	4
8	(Morocco) Kawtar Bentaleb	RSB	4
10	(Morocco) Nouhaila Faidi	FUS	3
10	(Morocco) Fatima Zahra Taouzri	UTS	3
