= 2026–27 Moroccan Women's Championship D1 =

24th season of top Moroccan women's football league

Moroccan Division 1 Féminine
- Season: 2026–27
- Dates: September 2026 – May 2027

The 2026–27 Moroccan Women's Championship D1 is the 25th season of the Moroccan Division 1 Féminine, the top national division of women's football in Morocco.

AS FAR are the defending champions, having won the title for an eleventh consecutive season (and 13th title overall).

== Teams ==
Twelve teams will contest the 2026–27 season. Hilal Athletic Nador and USS Berkane were promoted as 2025–26 Division 2 runners-up and winners respectively. replacing relagted side; Lionnes Assa-Mahbès and Itihad Tanger who ended the season in the bottom two.

Team	Acronym	Location	2025–26 season
AM Laâyoune	AMLFF	Laayoune	6th
AS FAR	ASFAR	Rabat	1st
CS Hilal Temara	HST	Temara	8th
Fath US	FUS	Rabat	2nd
HA Nador	HANFF	Nador	D2, 2nd
Phoenix Marrakech	PFAM	Marrakesh	9th
Raja Ait Iazza	ARAFF	Ait Iaaza	10th
RS Berkane	RSB	Berkane	4th
SC Casablanca	SCC	Casablanca	7th
US Touarga	UTS	Rabat	5th
USS Berkane	USSB	Berkane	D2, 1st
Wydad AC	WAC	Casablanca	3rd

=== Personnel, kits and sponsorship ===
Team	Head coach	Captain(s)	Kit manufacturer	Shirt sponsor
AMLFF	(Morocco) Mehdi Bouabidi		(Morocco) Bhero	
ASFAR	(Morocco) Hicham Drissi	(Morocco) Ghizlane Chebbak	(Germany) Puma	
HST	(Morocco) Hassan Foutou			
FUS	(Morocco) Mehdi El Qaichouri		(Spain) Joma	NOVEC, Cosumar
HANFF	(Morocco) Kaoutar Rida		(Morocco) OM Sport	Doha
PFAM			(Morocco) Beda	Leptis, BCI Aerospace
ARAFF			(Morocco) Bhero	Jaouda
RSB	(Morocco) Abdelhanin Amkar		(Morocco) Bang Sports	Atay Dahmiss, NationalGaz, Viva
SCC	(South Africa) Jerry Tshabalala		(United States) Nike	ice
UTS	(Guinea) Amara Condé	(Mauritania) Fatou Diop	(Italy) Macron	
USSB	(Morocco) Rachid Abbadi	(Morocco) Fatima Daoudi		
WAC	(Morocco) Kamal Taouil		(Italy) Kappa	

=== Foreign players ===
Each club may register a maximum of three foreign players.

Club	Player 1	Player 2	Player 3
AMLFF	(Cameroon) Berthe Abega	(Mauritania) Ramata Gangué	
ASFAR	(Jamaica) Shanise Foster		
HST	(Cameroon) Bernadette Rayna	(Democratic Republic of the Congo) Jeannette Feza	(Ivory Coast) Christine Lohoues
FUS	(Equatorial Guinea) Mari Cruz Ebula	(Guinea) Aminata Camara	(Mali) Kadidiatou Diabaté
HANFF	(Chad) Solange Larkingam	(Equatorial Guinea) Asunción Oye	
PFAM	(Cameroon) Berthe Abega	(Republic of the Congo) Flore Ngoma	(Mali) Aïcha Samaké
ARAFF			
RSB	(Nigeria) Racheal Kolawole		
SCC	(Burkina Faso) Salimata Simporé	(Cameroon) Yvana Mbomozomo	(Equatorial Guinea) Lynda Mendoua
UTS	(Ivory Coast) Nadège Koffi	(Mauritania) Fatou Diop	
USSB	(Gabon) Amira Nzé	(Nigeria) Angela Michael	
WAC	(Ivory Coast) Sylviane Kokora	(Senegal) Wolimata Ndiaye	(Senegal) Adama Sané

== League table ==
Pos	Team	Pld	W	D	L	GF	GA	GD	Pts	Qualification or relegation
1	US Touarga	5	3	1	1	10	6	+4	10	Qualification for the 2027 Champions League UNAF Qualifiers
2	RS Berkane	4	3	1	0	7	3	+4	10	
3	HA Nador	5	2	3	0	9	6	+3	9	
4	Wydad AC	5	3	0	2	8	6	+2	9	
5	SC Casablanca	5	2	1	2	13	9	+4	7	
6	Raja Ait Iazza	3	2	0	1	4	5	−1	6	
7	AS FAR	2	1	1	0	4	1	+3	4	
8	Fath US	3	1	1	1	4	4	0	4	
9	Phoenix Marrakech	5	1	1	3	6	9	−3	4	
10	AM Laâyoune	3	1	0	2	5	5	0	3	
11	USS Berkane	4	0	1	3	2	6	−4	1	Relegation to 2027–28 Moroccan Women's Division 2
12	CS Hilal Temara	4	0	0	4	2	14	−12	0	Relegation to 2027–28 Moroccan Women's Division 2

Updated to match(es) played on 16 November 2026. Source: FRMF
Rules for classification: 1) Points; 2) Head-to-head points; 3) Goal difference; 4) Number of goals scored

== Results ==
Home \ Away	ASFAR	FUS	WAC	RSB	UTS	AMLFF	SCC	HST	PFAM	ARAFF	USSB	HANFF
AS FAR	—		3–0			Post.		23 Nov	1–1			
Fath US		—					3–2	Post.				
Wydad AC			—	1–2		22 Nov			3–1	3–0		
RS Berkane		22 Nov		—							2–0	1–1
US Touarga					—	4–2	21 Nov				3–2	
AM Laâyoune						—		3–0	0–1			
SC Casablanca				1–2			—	5–0				3–3
CS Hilal Temara					1–3			—				1–3
Phoenix Marrakech							1–2		—	2–3		22 Nov
Raja Ait Iazza	Post.	Post.			1–0					—	22 Nov	
USS Berkane	Post.	0–0	0–1								—	
HA Nador		2–1			0–0							—

Updated to match(es) played on 16 November 2026. Source: FRMF
Legend: Blue = home team win; Yellow = draw; Red = away team win.
