= 2024–25 Moroccan Women's Championship D1 =

23rd season of top French women's football league

Moroccan Division 1 Féminine
- Season: 2024–25
- Dates: 21 September 2024 – May 2025.
- Champions: ASFAR
- Relegated: RCA Zemamra; Raja Aïn Harrouda; CSS Temara; SCC Mohammédia
- Matches: 182
- Goals: 729 (4.01 per match)
- Best player: (Morocco) Sanaâ Mssoudy
- Top goalscorer: (Kenya) Violet Wanyonyi (28 goals)
- Best goalkeeper: (Morocco) Zineb El Arari
- Biggest home win: ASFAR 22–0 SCCM; 11 December 2024
- Biggest away win: SCCM 0–20 FUS; 5 January 2025
- Highest scoring: ASFAR 22–0 SCCM; 11 December 2024
- Longest unbeaten run: 26 Games; AS FAR
- Longest winless run: 26 Games; SCC Mohammédia
- Longest losing run: 26 Games; SCC Mohammédia

The 2024–25 National Professional Women's Football Championship D1, was the 23rd season of top national women's football league in Morocco. The league draw took place on 2 September 2024, just weeks before the season's start.

AS FAR were the defending champions, having obtained their 11th title in the 2023–24 season. and successfully retained the title, going unbeaten throughout the season.

== Teams ==
Location of teams in 2024–25 Moroccan Women's Championship

Competing in the 2024–25 season are the following 14 teams:

Team	Acronym	Manager	Home ground	Capacity	2023–24 season
AMFF Laâyoune	AMLFF	(Morocco) Abdelhak Sebai	Sheikh Mohamed Laghdaf Stadium, Laâyoune	15,000	3rd
AS FAR	ASFAR	(Morocco) Mohamed Amine Alioua	Prince Moulay Abdellah Stadium, Rabat	45,000	1st
CS Hilal Temara	HST	(Morocco) Abdelhanin Amqar	Stade municipal de Témara, Temara	5,000	6th
CSS Temara	CSST	(Morocco) Mustapha Sadki	Stade municipal de Témara, Temara	5,000	7th
Fath US	FUS	(Morocco) Mehdi El Qaichouri	El Amal Stadium, Rabat	2,000	8th
Itihad Tanger FF	ITFF	(Morocco) Azedine El Khattaf	Stade du village sportif de Tanger, Tangier	5,000	11th
Phoenix Marrakech	PFAM	(Morocco) Rachid Ghalfaoui (Morocco) Adil M'Ghafri	Terrain Hay Mohammadi, Marrakesh	1,500	9th
Raja Aïn Harrouda	CRAH	(Morocco) Hamid El Katbi	Complexe Sportif Dakhla Aïn Harrouda, Aïn Harrouda	1,000	12th
Raja Aït Iazza FF	ARAFF	(Morocco) Mohamed Rafii (Morocco) Kamal Taouuile	Stade Communal Ait Iaaza, Ait Iaaza	1,500	10th
RCA Zemamra	RCAZ	(Morocco) Mourad Lahjouji	Stade Ahmed choukri, Zemamra	1,000	D2 S, 1st
RS Berkane	RSB	(France) Christophe Capian	Berkane Municipal Stadium, Berkane	10,000	D2 N, 1st
SC Casablanca	SCC	(Morocco) Mehdi Bouabidi	Stade Ba Mohamed, Casablanca	3,000	2nd
SCC Mohammédia	SCCM	(Morocco) Moahmmad El Derdour	Stade El Alia, Mohammédia	1,000	5th
Wydad AC	WAC	(Morocco) Aziz Elhassouni	Complexe Mohamed Benjelloun, Casablanca	3,000	4th

=== Team changes ===
RCA Zemamra and RS Berkane were promoted to the professional division after topping their respective South and North groups of Division 2, replacing Jawharat Najm Larache and Union Assa Zag, who finished 13th and 14th, respectively.

Entering league	Exiting league
Promoted from 2023 to 2024 Division 2	Relegated to 2024–25 Division 2
RCA Zemamra; RS Berkane	Jawharat Najm Larache; AUSF Assa-Zag

=== Foreign players ===
Club	Player 1	Player 2	Player 3	Player 4	Former player(s)
AMLFF	(Benin) Nadège Atanhloueto	(Democratic Republic of the Congo) Mangaka Banda (Note: Played the first half of the championship with Raja Ait Iazza)	(Kenya) Violet Wanyonyi	(Mauritania) Ramata Gangué	(Togo) Adjovi Zoutepe
ASFAR	(Cameroon) Julie Nke	(Mozambique) Ninika	(Nigeria) Anuoluwapo Salisu		(Nigeria) Maureen Okpala
HST	(Equatorial Guinea) Mari Cruz Ebula	(Nigeria) Rasheedat Adeniran	(Nigeria) Effiom Ekeng	(Nigeria) Regina Omede	
CSST	(Equatorial Guinea) Rocío Coffi	(Ghana) Akua Nyamekye	(Nigeria) Joan Benedict		(Burkina Faso) Limata Nikiéma
FUS	(Gabon) Amira Nze (Note: Played the first half of the championship with Wydad AC)	(Guinea) Aminata Camara	(Togo) Odette Gnintegma	(Togo) Amiratou N'djambara	(Republic of the Congo) Aminata Dembele
ITFF	(Benin) Yolande Gnammi	(Mali) Adoudou Konaté	(Mali) Hawa Ndiaye	(Nigeria) Ginika Nkeoma (Note: Played the first half of the championship with RCA Zemamra)	(Togo) Tabita Kponvi
PFAM	(Burkina Faso) Balkissa Sawadogo	(Ghana) Catherine Arthur	(Nigeria) Grace Aaron	(Togo) Moussirietou Adinda-Akpo	(Argentina) Mariana Beatriz
CRAH	(Chad) Solange Larkingam	(Chad) Salamatou Tchinsou	(Ghana) Sarah Inkoom	(Nigeria) Recheal Amaewhule	(Chad) Kani Mahamat Abdoulaye
ARAFF	(Cameroon) Michelle Ngo	(Republic of the Congo) Chimène Ngazue	(Democratic Republic of the Congo) Feza Kalombo	(Nigeria) Owoeye Temilope	
RCAZ	(Cameroon) Florence Fanta	(Ivory Coast) Kadi Koné	(Nigeria) Oluchi Janice	(Ghana) Akua Nyamekye	
RSB	(Algeria) Leïla Elhadj	(Republic of the Congo) Paulmiche Mahouna	(Mali) Salimata Diarra	(Nigeria) Racheal Kolawole	
SCC	(Ivory Coast) Nadège Koffi	(Ivory Coast) Sylviane Kokora	(Mali) Aicha Samake	(Nigeria) Mercy Itimi	
SCCM	(Cameroon) Elisabeth Mbonjo	(Ivory Coast) Rukayatu Yusufu	(Ivory Coast) Christelle Gogo	(Ivory Coast) Victoria Coulibaly	
WAC	(Democratic Republic of the Congo) Dorcas Masanga	(Nigeria) Grace Henry	(Senegal) Adama Sané	(South Africa) Lebogang Mabatle	

== League table ==
Pos	Team	Pld	W	D	L	GF	GA	GD	Pts	Qualification or relegation
1	AS FAR (C)	26	23	3	0	106	8	+98	72	Qualification for the 2025 CAF Women's Champions League UNAF Qualifiers
2	RS Berkane	26	19	5	2	74	16	+58	62	
3	SC Casablanca	26	16	5	5	56	18	+38	53	
4	Fath US	26	14	7	5	81	31	+50	49	
5	AMFF Laâyoune	26	13	6	7	85	36	+49	45	
6	Wydad AC	26	13	6	7	67	27	+40	45	
7	CS Hilal Temara	26	10	7	9	44	32	+12	37	
8	Itihad Tanger	26	10	2	14	54	53	+1	32	
9	Phoenix Marrakech	26	7	8	11	30	35	−5	29	
10	Raja Ait Iazza	26	8	5	13	44	55	−11	29	
11	RCA Zemamra	26	6	7	13	38	51	−13	25	Relegation to 2025–26 Moroccan Women's Division 2
12	Raja Aïn Harrouda	26	7	2	17	22	52	−30	23	Relegation to 2025–26 Moroccan Women's Division 2
13	CSS Temara	26	4	1	21	20	110	−90	13	Relegation to 2025–26 Moroccan Women's Division 2
14	SCC Mohammédia	26	0	0	26	8	205	−197	0	Relegation to 2025–26 Moroccan Women's Division 2

Source: Soccerway
Rules for classification: 1) Points; 2) Head-to-head points; 3) Goal difference; 4) Number of goals scored
(C) Champions

=== Results ===
Home \ Away	FAR	RSB	SCC	FUS	AML	WAC	HST	ITF	PHM	RAI	RCZ	RAH	CST	MOH
AS FAR	—	1–1	2–0	5–1	4–1	1–0	1–0	3–1	4–0	6–0	3–0	3–0	11–0	22–0
RS Berkane	1–2	—	2–1	0–1	1–1	2–1	2–0	5–2	4–1	5–0	5–0	4–0	5–0	3–0
SC Casablanca	0–1	0–0	—	0–0	2–1	5–0	1–1	4–0	1–1	3–0	4–0	2–0	2–1	8–0
Fath US	0–3	1–2	2–3	—	2–2	3–1	1–1	4–0	1–1	6–0	2–2	3–1	6–0	11–0
AMFF Laâyoune	0–4	1–2	1–1	1–2	—	1–0	4–1	2–0	3–1	1–2	4–3	4–0	8–0	2–0
Wydad AC	1–1	2–2	2–1	1–1	3–3	—	2–0	2–0	3–0	2–2	3–0	7–0	6–1	10–0
CS Hilal Temara	0–0	0–2	0–2	1–2	2–1	0–0	—	1–3	2–1	2–1	0–0	2–0	6–0	6–1
Itihad Tanger	1–4	1–2	0–2	2–4	1–1	2–1	2–5	—	3–1	0–1	1–1	0–2	4–0	3–0
Phoenix Marrakech	0–2	0–0	0–1	0–0	1–2	1–0	1–1	1–4	—	0–0	0–0	2–0	5–0	8–0
Raja Ait Iazza	0–4	1–4	2–1	1–2	2–2	1–4	2–2	1–4	0–1	—	1–1	0–1	2–0	15–0
RCA Zemamra	1–3	0–1	2–5	3–0 (Note: The original result of the match was a 2–0 win for Fath Union Sport. However, the result was later overturned and awarded as a 3–0 win to RCAZ by forfeit, after it was determined that FUS had only listed three U-21 players on the match sheet instead of the required four.)	1–3	0–1	2–0	2–4	3–0	0–1	—	1–1	3–3	3–1
Raja Aïn Harrouda	0–3	0–3	0–2	0–2	1–3	0–2	0–3	3–0 (Note: The initial outcome of the match was a 2–0 win for Itihad Tanger FF. However, following a regulatory decision, the result was amended to a 3–0 win awarded to Raja Aïn Harrouda.)	0–0	0–1	2–0	—	2–4	2–0
CSS Temara	0–6	0–3	0–2	1–4	0–12	0–6	1–3	1–2	0–2	2–1	1–4	0–2	—	4–0
SCC Mohammédia	0–7	0–13	0–3	0–20	0–18	0–7	0–5	0–14	1–2	2–7	2–6	1–5	0–1	—

Source: FRMF
Legend: Blue = home team win; Yellow = draw; Red = away team win.

== Season Statistics ==
=== Top scorers ===
Rank	Player	Club	Goals
1	(Kenya) Violet Nanjala	AMLFF	28
2	(Benin) Yolande Gnammi	ITFF	20
2	(Mali) Salimata Diarra	RSB	20
4	(Morocco) Doha El Madani	ASFAR	18
5	(Mauritania) Ramata Gangué	AMLFF	17
6	(Morocco) Chaymaa Mourtaji	ASFAR	16
6	(Togo) Amiratou N'djambara	FUS	16
6	(Morocco) Sanaâ Mssoudy	ASFAR	16
9	(Morocco) Fatima Zahraa Naini	RSB	14
9	(Nigeria) Mercy Itimi	SCC	14
9	(Morocco) Anissa Belkasmi	RSB	14
9	(Morocco) Salma Bouguerch	WAC	14
Source: Khalil Moustahlaf

=== Clean sheets ===
Rank	Player	Club	Clean sheets
1	(Morocco) Imane Abdelahad	SCC	13
2	(Morocco) Raouia Bellafquih	PFAM	11
2	(Morocco) Hind Hasnaoui	ASFAR	11
4	(Morocco) Zineb El Arari	RSB	10
5	(Morocco) Nouhaila Faidi	HST/FUS	8
5	(Morocco) Fatima Zahra El Jebraoui	WAC	8
7	(Morocco) Hanane Azyane	AMLFF	6
7	(Morocco) Khadija Er-Rmichi	ASFAR	6
9	(Morocco) Kawtar Bentaleb	FUS	5
10	(Morocco) Rafika Aghetass	ARAFF	4
Source: Khalil Moustahlaf
