= Fatima Zahra El Jebraoui =

Moroccan association football player

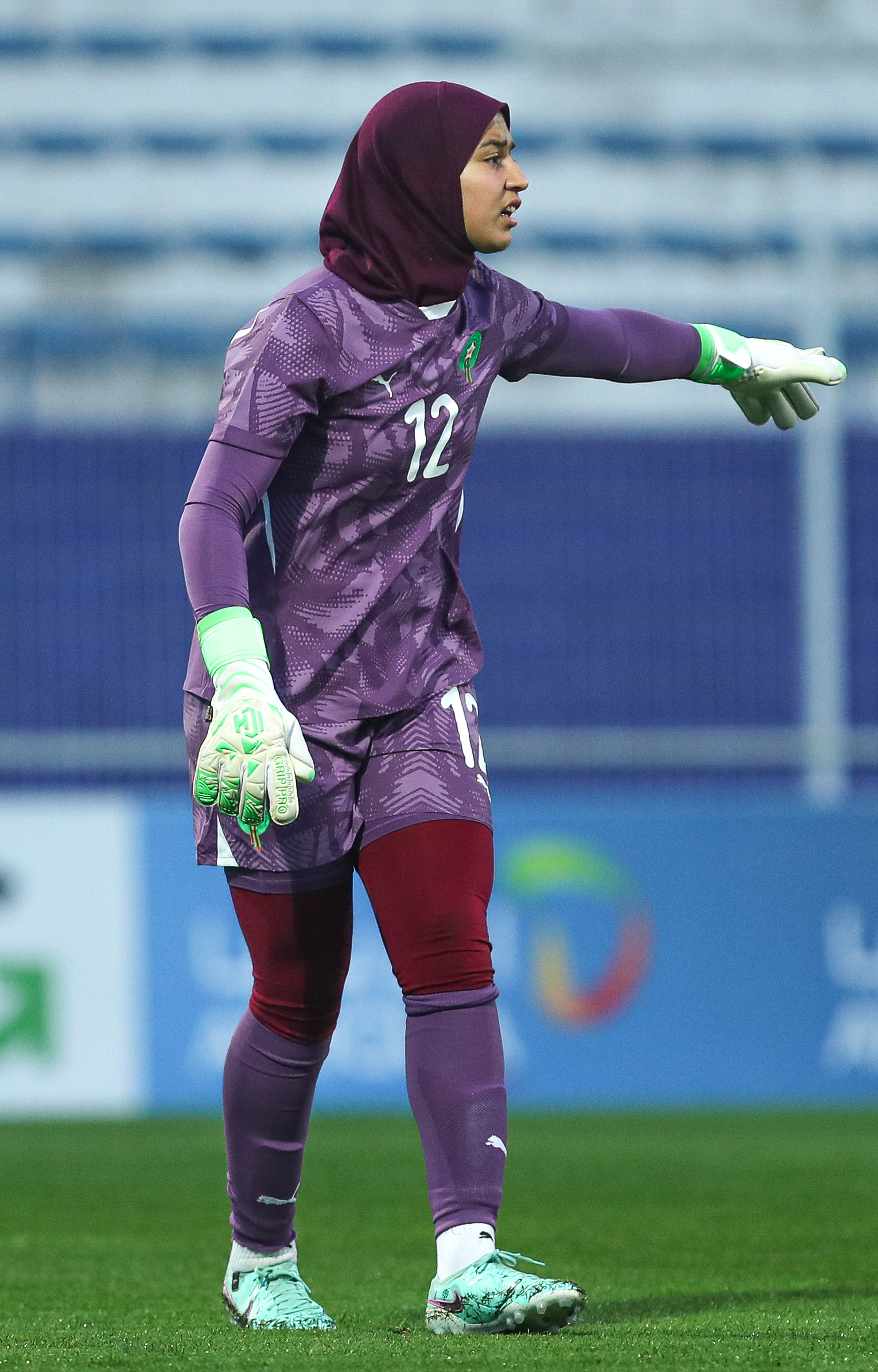
- Jebraoui playing for Morocco in a match against Ghana in Casablanca

Personal information
- Date of birth: 8 August 2007 (age 19)
- Height: 1.79 m (5 ft 10 in)
- Position: Goalkeeper

Team information
- Current team: Wydad
- Number: 12

Youth career
- FAR

Senior career*
Years	Team	Apps	(Gls)
2023–2024	FAR	1	(0)
2025–	Wydad	18	(0)

International career^{‡}
2023–2025	Morocco U17		
2024–	Morocco U20		
2024–	Morocco U23		
2024–	Morocco		
- * Club domestic league appearances and goals as of 6 July 2025 ‡ National team caps and goals as of 6 July 2025

Fatima Zahra El Jebraoui (Arabic: فاطمة الزهراء الجبراوي; born 8 August 2007) is a Moroccan professional footballer who plays as a goalkeeper for Moroccan Women's Championship D1 club Wydad AC and the Morocco national team.

== Club career ==
=== AS FAR ===
Beginning her career at AS FAR's academy, El Jebraoui was promoted to the first team in 2023.

In the 2023–24 season, El Jebraoui won the domestic double with AS FAR, winning both the Moroccan Women's Championship D1 title and the Moroccan Women Throne Cup, and the club finished fourth in the CAF Women's Champions League (CWCL).

=== Wydad AC ===
In 2024, El Jebraoui joined Wydad AC after a strong performance at the 2024 FIFA U-20 Women's World Cup in Colombia.

In the 2024–25 season, El Jebraoui's Wydad made it to the final of the 2024–25 Moroccan Women Throne Cup, hoping to secure Wydad's first ever cup title, but were defeating 3–1 by El Jebraoui's former club, AS FAR.

== International career ==
El Jebraoui was part of Morocco's 24-player squad for the 2024 Women's Africa Cup of Nations on home soil.
