= Chaymaa Mourtaji =

Moroccan footballer and futsal player (born 1995)

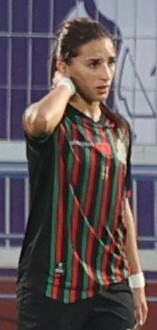
- Mourtaji in 2024

Personal information
- Full name: Chaymaa Mourtaji
- Date of birth: 8 December 1995 (age 30)
- Place of birth: Casablanca, Morocco
- Height: 1.62 m (5 ft 4 in)
- Positions: Forward; winger

Team information
- Current team: UTS Rabat
- Number: 11

Senior career*
Years	Team	Apps	(Gls)
2016–2020	Difaâ El Jadidi		
2020–2024	Sporting Casablanca		
2024–2025	AS FAR		
2025–	UTS Rabat		

International career^{‡}
2022–	Morocco	5	(0)
2025–	Morocco Futsal	4	(0)
- * Club domestic league appearances and goals as of 16 August 2026 ‡ National team caps and goals as of 16 August 2026

Chaymaa Mourtaji (Arabic: شيماء مرتاجي, pronounced [ʃi.maːʔ mər.taː.ʒi]; 8 December 1995) is a Moroccan footballer and futsal player who plays as a forward or winger for Moroccan Women's Championship D1 (Botola Féminine) club UTS Rabat and the Morocco national football and fustal teams. She previously played for Botola Féminine clubs Difaâ El Jadidi, Sporting Casablanca and AS FAR.

== Club career ==
=== Sporting Casablanca ===
During the 2020–21 season, signed for Moroccan Women's Championship D2 (Division 2 Féminine) club Sporting Casablanca. She played a key part in their promotion to the Moroccan Women's Championship D1 (Botola Féminine) for the 2021–22 season. In the 2021–22 season, the club finished third in the league and runners-up in that season's Moroccan Women's Throne Cup. In the 2022–23 season, the club finished runners-up in the league, and she finished second in the Golden Boot race.

After finishing runners-up in the 2022–23 season, Sporting Casablanca qualified for the 2023 UNAF Women's Club Tournament (UWCT), hosted in Alexandria, Egypt. In the opening match on 24 August, Mourtaji scored a brace against Algerian side Afak Relizane in a 4–3 victory. In the second match, she scored a hat-trick in a 3–1 victory over Tunisian side ASF Sousse. After winning all three qualification matches at Alexandria Stadium (the third of which being), the club qualified for the CAF Women's Champions League (CWCL) that year for the first time ever. The club would go on to finish runners-up in the Champions League. In the 2023–24 season, the club finished second in the Botola once again.

=== AS FAR ===
Ahead of the 2024–25 season, signed for Botola Féminine club AS FAR, the most successful club in the league. She made her début on 24 August 2024 in a 4–0 away victory over CF Akbou at Salem Mabrouki Stadium in Rouïba, Algeria in the UWCT, which served as a qualifier for that season's Champions League. That season, AS FAR won both the UWCT and the Botola, as well as finishing runners-up in the Champions League (which Morocco hosted). She departed the club at the end of the season.

=== UTS Rabat ===
Ahead of the 2025–26 season, Mourtaji signed for Botola Féminine club UTS Rabat.

== International career ==
=== Morocco ===
In 2022, Mourtaji received her first call-up for Morocco by French manager Reynald Pedros for a three-match friendly series against the Republic of the Congo, Zambia and Ivory Coast on 11, 18 and 23 June, respectively, all held at Prince Moulay Abdellah Stadium. She made her début in the match against Congo, which ended in a 7–0 win for Morocco. The matches against Zambia and Ivory Coast ended in 1–1 and 0–0 draws, respectively.

Mourtaji was part of Pedros' 26-player squad for the 2022 Women's Africa Cup of Nations (WAFCON). Morocco qualified for the 2023 FIFA Women's World Cup in Australia and New Zealand, the country's first ever appearance at the FIFA Women's World Cup, and went on to finish runners-up at the tournament.

After missing out on the squads for the 2023 World Cup and the 2024 WAFCON (the latter of which was hosted in Morocco), Mourtaji received a call-up by Spanish manager Jorge Vilda as part of his 26-player squad for the 2026 WAFCON, which was the third consecutive edition of the tournament hosted in Morocco. Morocco qualified for the 2027 World Cup in Brazil, their second ever qualification for the tournament, and eventually finished fourth.

=== Morocco Futsal ===
Mourtaji received her first call-up for Morocco in futsal by manager Adil Sayeh for a match against Slovakia on 4 June 2025 at the Mohammed VI Football Complex in Salé, Morocco. She scored her first international goal in the match, which ended in a 2–2 draw. She was later called up for the 2025 Futsal Week Women's June Cup (FWWJC) at Finida Hall in Poreč, Croatia from 18 to 22 June 2025, in which Morocco finished third. She was then selected for the 2025 Xanxerê Women's International Tournament (XWIT) at the Arena Ivo Sguissardi in Xanxerê, Santa Catarina, Brazil from 20 to 24 August 2025, which Morocco finished third in. She was then selected as part of Morocco's 14-player squad for the 2025 FIFA Futsal Women's World Cup in the Philippines from 21 November to 7 December 2025, which was the first edition that Morocco had qualified for. Morocco finished second in Group A before being eliminated in the quarter-finals.

== Honours ==
Sporting Casablanca

- Moroccan Women's Championship D1 — Runners-up: 2022–23, 2023–24
- Moroccan Women's Throne Cup — Runners-up: 2020–21
- CAF Women's Champions League — Runners-up: 2023
- UNAF Women's Club Tournament — Champions: 2023

AS FAR

- Moroccan Women's Championship D1 — Champions: 2024–25
- UNAF Women's Club Tournament — Champions: 2024
- CAF Women's Champions League — Runners-up: 2024

Morocco

- Women's Africa Cup of Nations — Runners-up: 2022, 2024

Morocco Futsal

- Futsal Week — Third place: 2025
