= 2019–20 Moroccan Women's Throne Cup =

2019–20 Women's Throne Cup
Tournament details
- Country: Morocco

The 2019-20 Moroccan Women's Throne Cup is the women version of Moroccan Throne Cup, the main knockout football tournament in Morocco

== Second round ==
The draw for the Second Round was held on 15 December 2020.

| Team 1 | Score | Team 2 |
|---|---|---|
| Chabab Mohammedia | 3–1 | Hilal Temara |
| Sporting Casablanca | 1–3 | Nassim Sidi Moumen |
| Association Generations Solidarité | 1–3 | Nahdat M'diq |
| Jawhara Najm Larache | w/o (Note: Najah Azrou won on a walkover after a no show by Jawhara Najm Larache.) | Najah Azrou |
| FC Saïdia | 0–1 | Club Oasis Errachidia |
| Association Fqih Bensaleh | 0–0 (3–0 p) | Esperance Tighssaline |
| Kawkab Marrakesh | 1–1 (4–2 p) | Atlas Taliouine |
| Nahdat Tan-Tan | 0–4 | Association Tamasna |
| Difaa Jadidi | 3–0 | Zohour Safi |

== Third round ==
The draw for the Third Round was held on 28 December 2020. Club Oasis Errachidia, Nahdat M'diq and Association Tamasna received a bye for the next round.

| Team 1 | Score | Team 2 |
|---|---|---|
| Afaq Khenifra | w/o (Note: Chabab Atlas Khénifra won on a walkover after a no show by Afaq Khenifra.) | Chabab Atlas Khénifra |
| Najah Azrou | 4–0 | Club Municipal Meknes |
| Chabab Mohammedia | 1–1 (4–1 p) | ASDCT Ain Atiq |
| AS FAR | 6–1 | Ittihad Tanger |
| Association Fqih Bensaleh | w/o (Note: Atlas 05 Fkih Ben Salah won on a walkover after a no show by Association Fqih Bensaleh.) | Atlas 05 Fkih Ben Salah |
| Nassim Sidi Moumen | 0–0 (4–3 p) | Raja Ain Harouda |
| Difaa Jadidi | 0–0 (4–3 p) | Kawkab Marrakesh |
| Amjad Taroudant | 2–5 | Raja Ait Izza |
| Club Municipal de Laayoune | 1–1 (4–2 p) | Union Assa Zag |

== Fourth round ==
The draw for the Fourth Round was held on 21 January 2021. In this round eight teams have to compete for a spot in the quarterfinals while the four others will receive a bye to the quarterfinals. Those four teams were Najah Azrou, Atlas 05 Fkih Ben Salah, Chabab Mohammedia and Club Municipal de Laayoune.

| Team 1 | Score | Team 2 |
|---|---|---|
| Chabab Atlas Khénifra | 3–0 | Club Oasis Errachidia |
| AS FAR | 6–0 | Nahdat M'diq |
| Nassim Sidi Moumen | 3–1 | Difaa Jadidi |
| Raja Ait Izza | 6–0 | Association Tamasna |

== Final Phase bracket ==
Quarter-finals
Chabab Atlas Khénifra | 3
Najah Azrou | 0
Raja Ait Izza | 2
Club Municipal de Laayoune | 1
AS FAR | 9
Chabab Mohammedia | 0
Nassim Sidi Moumen | 1 (3)
Atlas 05 Fkih Ben Salah | 1 (4)

Semi-finals
Chabab Atlas Khénifra | 2
Raja Ait Izza | 5
AS FAR | 3
Atlas 05 Fkih Ben Salah | 0

Final
Raja Ait Izza | 0
AS FAR | 1

== Quarter-finals ==
The draw was held on the same time as the one for the fourth round. The teams that received a bye in the previous round will have to play on the opposite team fields.

| Team 1 | Score | Team 2 |
|---|---|---|
| Chabab Atlas Khénifra | 3–0 | Najah Azrou |
| AS FAR | 9–0 | Chabab Mohammedia |
| Nassim Sidi Moumen | 1–1 (3–4 p) | Atlas 05 Fkih Ben Salah |
| Raja Ait Izza | 2–1 | Club Municipal de Laayoune |

== Semi-finals ==
| Team 1 | Score | Team 2 |
|---|---|---|
| Chabab Atlas Khénifra | 2–5 | Raja Ait Izza |
| AS FAR | 3–0 | Atlas 05 Fkih Ben Salah |

== See also ==
- 2020-21 Moroccan Women's Championship Division One
- 2020-21 Moroccan Women's Championship Division Two
- 2020–21 Botola
