= Moroccan Women's Championship D2 =

Division 2 Féminin; البطولة الوطنية الاحترافية القسم الثاني
- Country: Morocco
- Confederation: CAF (Africa)
- Number of clubs: 28 (12 in 2025–26)
- Level on pyramid: 2
- Promotion to: Division 1 Féminine
- Relegation to: Division Amateur
- Domestic cup: Throne Cup
- Current champions: RS Berkane (1st title)
- Website: https://frmf.ma/d2-feminin
- Current: 2024–25 Division 2 Féminine

The Moroccan Women's Championship D2, officially the Women's Professional National Football Championship D2 (French: Championnat National Professionnel de Football Féminin D2; Arabic: البطولة الوطنية الاحترافية لكرة القدم النسائية القسم الثاني) is the second-tier professional women's football league in Morocco. The competition is overseen by the Royal Moroccan Football Federation and organized by the LNFF (French: Ligue Nationale de Football Féminin).

RS Berkane, the defending champions, won their first title in 2024 beating RCA Zemamra 3–2 in the final. They have since been promoted to a higher league.

== History ==
Starting from the 2020–21 season, the league, like its first division counterpart, transitioned to professional status.

In September 2024, the LNFF announced the restructuring of the league into a single group with 12 teams.

== Teams ==
=== Current teams ===
The following teams will compete in the 2025–26 season: eight retained their place from the previous campaign, while four were relegated from the top division.

Team	Acronym	Location	2024–25 season
Amjad Taroudant	AAT	Taroudant	South, 4th of 14
AS Chabab Tarrast	ASSCHT	Inezgane	South, 5th of 14
CS Difaâ Marrakech	CSDM	Marrakesh	South, 2nd of 14
CSS Temara	CSST	Temara	D1, 13th of 14 (Relegated)
FC Saidia	FCS	Saidia	North, 3rd of 14
HA Nador	HAN	Nador	North, 2nd of 14
Nacer Athletic	ANAFF	Sidi Moumen	North, 5th of 14
Raja Aïn Harrouda	CRAH	Aïn Harrouda	D1, 12th of 14 (Relegated)
Raja CA	RCA	Casablanca	South, 3rd of 14
RCA Zemamra	RCAZ	Zemamra	D1, 11th of 14 (Relegated)
SCC Mohammédia	SCCM	Mohammedia	D1, 14th of 14 (Relegated)
USS Berkane	USSB	Berkane	North, 4th of 14

== Champions ==
=== Pre-professional era ===
Season	North Champion	South Champion	Central Champion	Oriental Champion	Teams
2019–20	ANCS	CSCHT	DHJ	OCK	30 (Note: The league season was originally scheduled with 33 teams, but OCS, AMG, and AOSFZ pulled out.)

=== Professional Era ===
Season	North Champion	South Champion	Teams
2020–21	SCC Mohammédia	SC Casablanca	32
2021–22	Fath US	Amjad Taroudant	28 (Note: The league season was originally set to feature 30 teams, with 15 in each group, however ARMSF and CASKH withdrew from the North group)

A playoff match was introduced between the North and South groups to decide the champion of the second division.

Season	Champion	Score	Runner-up	Teams
2022–23	CS Hilal Temara (North group winner)	2–1	Phoenix Marrakech (South group winner)	28
2023–24	RS Berkane (North group winner)	3–2	RCA Zemamra (South group winner)	28
2024–25	Union Touarga (North group winner)	2–0	Lionnes Assa-Mahbès (South group winner)	28

== See also ==
- Moroccan Women Throne Cup
- Moroccan Women's Championship D1
