= 2020–21 Moroccan Women's Championship D1 =

Moroccan football league championship

- Season: 2020–21
- Dates: 2 January 2021 – Summer 2021
- Champions: AS FAR
- Relegated: Amjad Taroudant
- Matches: 155
- Goals: 524 (3.38 per match)
- Biggest home win: AS FAR 11-0 Difaa Jadidi (23 May 2021)
- Biggest away win: Difaa Jadidi 0-9 AS FAR (31 January 2021)
- Highest scoring: Municipal Laayoune 7-5 Atlas Khénifra (9 July 2021)
- Longest winning run: 12 matches AS FAR
- Longest unbeaten run: 21 matches AS FAR
- Longest winless run: 13 matches Amjad Taroudant
- Longest losing run: 9 matches Amjad Taroudant
- All statistics correct as of 15 July 2021.

The 2020–21 Moroccan Women's Championship Division One, is the first season of Moroccan top tier of women's football under its new professional format.

Locations of the 2020–21 Amateur Division National
Locations of the 2020–21 Amateur Division National

== Teams ==
| Team name | Acronym | Location | Stadium |
|---|---|---|---|
| ASDCT Ain Atiq | ASDCT | Aïn Atiq | Municipal-Temara |
| Raja Ait Iazza | ARAFF | Taroudant | Stade Père Jégo-Taroudant |
| AUSF Assa-Zag | AUSFAZ | Assa | Stade Municipale-Assa |
| AS FAR | FAR | Rabat | Centre Sportif des FAR-Salé |
| Atlas 05 Fkih Ben Salah | ATLAS05 | Fkih Ben Salah | Roches Noires-Casablanca |
| Difaa Jadidi | DHJ | El Jadida | Stade Ahmed Lachehab |
| Afaq Khenifra | CASKH | Khenifra | Annexe Municipale-Khenifra |
| Chabab Atlas Khénifra | CAK | Khenifra | Annexe Municipale-Khenifra |
| Olympique Khouribga | OCK | Khouribga | CF R8-Khouribga |
| Club Municipal de Laayoune | AMLFF | Laayoune | Stade Cheikh Med Laghdaf |
| Nassim Sidi Moumen | ANCS | Casablanca | Municipal Sidi Moumen |
| Ittihad Tanger | ITFF | Tanger | Village Sportif-Tanger |
| Hilal Tarrast | ASSCHT | Inezgane | Stade Bakrim Hassan Sbaghi |
| Amjad Taroudant | AAT | Taroudant | Stade Père Jégo-Taroudant |

| | Regions of Morocco | Number of teams | Teams |
|---|---|---|---|
| 1 | Béni Mellal-Khénifra | 4 | Olympique Khouribga, Atlas 05 Fkih Ben Salah, Chabab Atlas Khénifra and Afaq Khenifra |
| 2 | Souss-Massa | 3 | Hilal Tarrast, Raja Ait Izza and Amjad Taroudant |
| 3 | Casablanca-Settat | 2 | Nassim Sidi Moumen and Difaa Jadidi |
| 3 | Rabat-Salé-Kénitra | 2 | AS FAR and ASDCT Ain Atiq |
| 5 | Tanger-Tetouan | 1 | Ittihad Tanger |
| 5 | Guelmim-Oued Noun | 1 | Union Assa Zag |
| 5 | Laâyoune-Sakia El Hamra | 1 | Club Municipal de Laayoune |

== League table ==
| Pos | Team | Pld | W | D | L | GF | GA | GD | Pts | Qualification or relegation |
|---|---|---|---|---|---|---|---|---|---|---|
| 1 | AS FAR (C, Q) | 23 | 21 | 1 | 1 | 128 | 8 | +120 | 64 | Qualification to CAF Women's Champions League |
| 2 | Raja Ait Iazza | 24 | 18 | 3 | 3 | 68 | 27 | +41 | 57 | |
| 3 | Club Municipal de Laayoune | 24 | 17 | 2 | 5 | 55 | 30 | +25 | 53 | |
| 4 | ASDCT Ain Atiq | 24 | 12 | 6 | 6 | 54 | 27 | +27 | 42 | |
| 5 | Atlas 05 Fkih Ben Salah | 24 | 10 | 5 | 9 | 28 | 36 | −8 | 35 | |
| 6 | Nassim Sidi Moumen | 23 | 10 | 4 | 9 | 32 | 40 | −8 | 34 | |
| 7 | Itihad Tanger | 24 | 9 | 6 | 9 | 31 | 34 | −3 | 33 | |
| 8 | Chabab Atlas Khénifra | 24 | 9 | 4 | 11 | 41 | 51 | −10 | 31 | |
| 9 | AUSF Assa-Zag | 24 | 9 | 3 | 12 | 25 | 32 | −7 | 30 | |
| 10 | Olympique Club de Khouribga | 24 | 8 | 2 | 14 | 19 | 39 | −20 | 26 | |
| 11 | Difaa Jadidi | 24 | 4 | 4 | 16 | 18 | 65 | −47 | 16 | |
| 12 | Hilal Tarrast | 24 | 3 | 3 | 18 | 14 | 66 | −52 | 12 | |
| 13 | Amjad Taroudant (R) | 24 | 2 | 3 | 19 | 11 | 69 | −58 | 9 | Relegation to Division II |
| 14 | Afaq Khenifra | 0 | 0 | 0 | 0 | 0 | 0 | 0 | 0 | Club folded |

Updated to match(es) played on 15 July 2021. Source:
Rules for classification: 1) Points; 2a) Head-to-head goal difference if they are two teams with equal points; 2b) Goal difference if they are more than two teams with equal points; 3) Number of wins; 4) Goals scored; 5) Play-off between involved teams.
(C) Champions; (Q) Qualified for the phase indicated; (R) Relegated

== Results ==
| Home \ Away | ASDCT | ARAFF | AUSFAZ | FAR | ATLAS05 | DHJ | CAK | OCK | AMLFF | ANCS | ITFF | ASSCHT | AAT | CASKH |
|---|---|---|---|---|---|---|---|---|---|---|---|---|---|---|
| ASDCT Ain Atiq | — | 2–2 | 1–2 | 0–4 | 3–1 | 2–0 | 3–1 | 3–1 | 2–0 | 1–1 | 1–1 | 8–0 | 4–0 | X |
| Raja Ait Izza | 2–1 | — | 2–0 | 3–2 | 3–3 | 7–1 | 2–2 | 1–0 | 3–2 | 3–0 | 2–1 | 9–0 | 2–0 | X |
| Union Assa Zag | 0–1 | 0–1 | — | 0–4 | 1–2 | 1–0 | 1–0 | 1–0 | 1–2 | 0–0 | 1–0 | 0–1 | 4–0 | X |
| AS FAR | 3–0 | 5–1 | 6–0 | — | 8–0 | 11–0 | 6–0 | 7–0 | 7–1 | 9–0 | 3–0 | 6–0 | 8–0 | X |
| Atlas 05 Fkih Ben Salah | 1–0 | 0–1 | 1–0 | 0–4 | — | 2–0 | 1–3 | 2–0 | 1–0 | 1–0 | 0–0 | 2–0 | 0–0 | X |
| Difaa Jadidi | 1–1 | 1–4 | 0–1 | 0–9 | 4–1 | — | 1–2 | 0–1 | 0–4 | 1–4 | 1–2 | 2–2 | 1–0 | X |
| Chabab Atlas Khénifra | 2–4 | 1–4 | 0–2 | 2–6 | 1–1 | 2–2 | — | 1–0 | 0–1 | 0–3 | 2–2 | 3–0 | 5–0 | X |
| Olympique Club de Khouribga | 2–1 | 0–3 | 2–1 | 0–3 | 0–0 | 1–0 | 1–2 | — | 1–2 | 0–2 | 1–3 | 2–2 | 1–0 | X |
| Club Municipal de Laayoune | 0–0 | 2–1 | 3–0 | 1–1 | 3–1 | 4–0 | 7–5 | 3–1 | — | 5–1 | 2–1 | 3–0 | 1–0 | X |
| Nassim Sidi Moumen | 0–2 | 2–3 | 2–2 | – | 3–2 | 3–0 | 0–1 | 1–0 | 2–0 | — | 2–2 | 4–2 | 1–0 | X |
| Ittihad Tanger | 2–2 | 1–0 | 0–0 | 0–8 | 2–1 | 1–2 | 1–2 | 0–1 | 1–2 | 4–0 | — | 2–0 | 2–1 | X |
| Hilal Tarrast | 0–4 | 0–3 | 0–5 | 0–2 | 0–1 | 0–1 | 1–3 | 1–2 | 0–2 | 2–0 | 0–1 | — | 2–0 | X |
| Amjad Taroudant | 1–8 | 1–6 | 4–2 | 0–6 | 0–4 | 0–0 | 2–1 | 0–2 | 1–5 | 0–1 | 0–2 | 1–1 | — | X |
| Afaq Khenifra | X | X | X | X | X | X | X | X | X | X | X | X | X | — |

Updated to match(es) played on 15 July 2021. Source:
Legend: Blue = home team win; Yellow = draw; Red = away team win.
For upcoming matches, an "a" indicates there is an article about the rivalry between the two participants.

== See also ==
- 2020–21 Moroccan Women's Championship Division Two
- 2019–20 Moroccan Women's Throne Cup
- 2020–21 Botola
