= Udoka Unachukwu =

Nigerian footballer (born 2005)

Personal information
- Full name: Rachel Udoka Unachukwu
- Date of birth: 18 December 2005 (age 20)
- Position: Goalkeeper

Team information
- Current team: Nasarawa Amazons F.C.
- Number: 32

International career
Years	Team	Apps	(Gls)
2024	Nigeria U20		
2024–	Nigeria		

Rachel Udoka Unachukwu OON (born 18 December 2005) is a professional footballer who plays as a Goalkeeper for Nasarawa Amazons F.C.. She plays for the Nigeria women's national team.

She was part of the Nigerian women national team squad that won the 2025 Women's Africa Cup of Nations and was awarded the national honour Officer of the Order of the Niger, a hundred thousand dollars and a three-bedroom apartment at the renewed hope estate in Abuja

== Honours ==
Nigeria

- Women's Africa Cup of Nations: 2024

Orders

- Officer of the Order of the Niger
