= Tochukwu Oluehi =

Nigerian footballer

Personal information
- Date of birth: 2 May 1987 (age 39)
- Height: 1.68 m (5 ft 6 in)
- Position: Goalkeeper

Senior career*
| Years | Team | Apps | (Gls) |
| 2006–2010 | Bayelsa Queens | | |
| 2011–2013 | Sunshine Queens | | |
| 2013–2014 | Bobruichanka Bobruisk | | |
| 2014–2015 | Rivers Angels | | |
| 2016 | Medkila IL | 21 | (0) |
| 2017–2020 | Rivers Angels | | |
| 2020–2021 | Pozoalbense | 0 | (0) |
| 2020–2022 | Maccabi Kishronot Hadera | | |
| 2022–2023 | Hakkarigücü Spor | 13 | (0) |
| 2023–2024 | Eastern Flames | 12 | (0) |

International career^{‡}
| 2007-2025 | Nigeria | | |
- * Club domestic league appearances and goals ‡ National team caps and goals as of =

Tochukwu Oluehi OON (born 2 May 1987) is a Nigerian football goalkeeper for the Nigeria women's national team.

== Club career ==
Oluehi played for Bobruichanka Bobruisk in the 2013–14 UEFA Women's Champions League. In April 2016, Oluehi and compatriot Cecilia Nku left Rivers Angels to join Norwegian Toppserien club Medkila IL. She played 21 games for Medkila, before returned to Rivers Angels and is since 2017 the Team captain, of the Angels.

In September 2022, she moved to Turkey and joined Hakkarigücü Spor to play in the 2022–23 Super League.

== International career ==
She also played three times an FIFA Women's World Cup and one time the Summer Olympic Games for the Nigeria women's national football team.

On 24 May 2019, Oluehi was called up to the Nigeria squad for the 2019 FIFA Women's World Cup.

Oluehi was called up to the Nigeria squad for the 2022 Women's Africa Cup of Nations.

On 16 June 2023, she was included in the 23-player Nigerian squad for the FIFA Women's World Cup 2023.

Oluehi was called up to the Nigeria squad for the 2024 Summer Olympics.

she was part of the Nigerian women national team squad that won the 2025 Women's Africa Cup of Nations and was awarded the national honour Officer of the Order of the Niger, a hundred thousand dollars and a three-bedroom apartments at the renewed hope estate in Abuja

== Honours ==
Nigeria

- Women's Africa Cup of Nations: 2024

Orders

- Officer of the Order of the Niger
