= Rkia Mazrouai =

Moroccan footballer

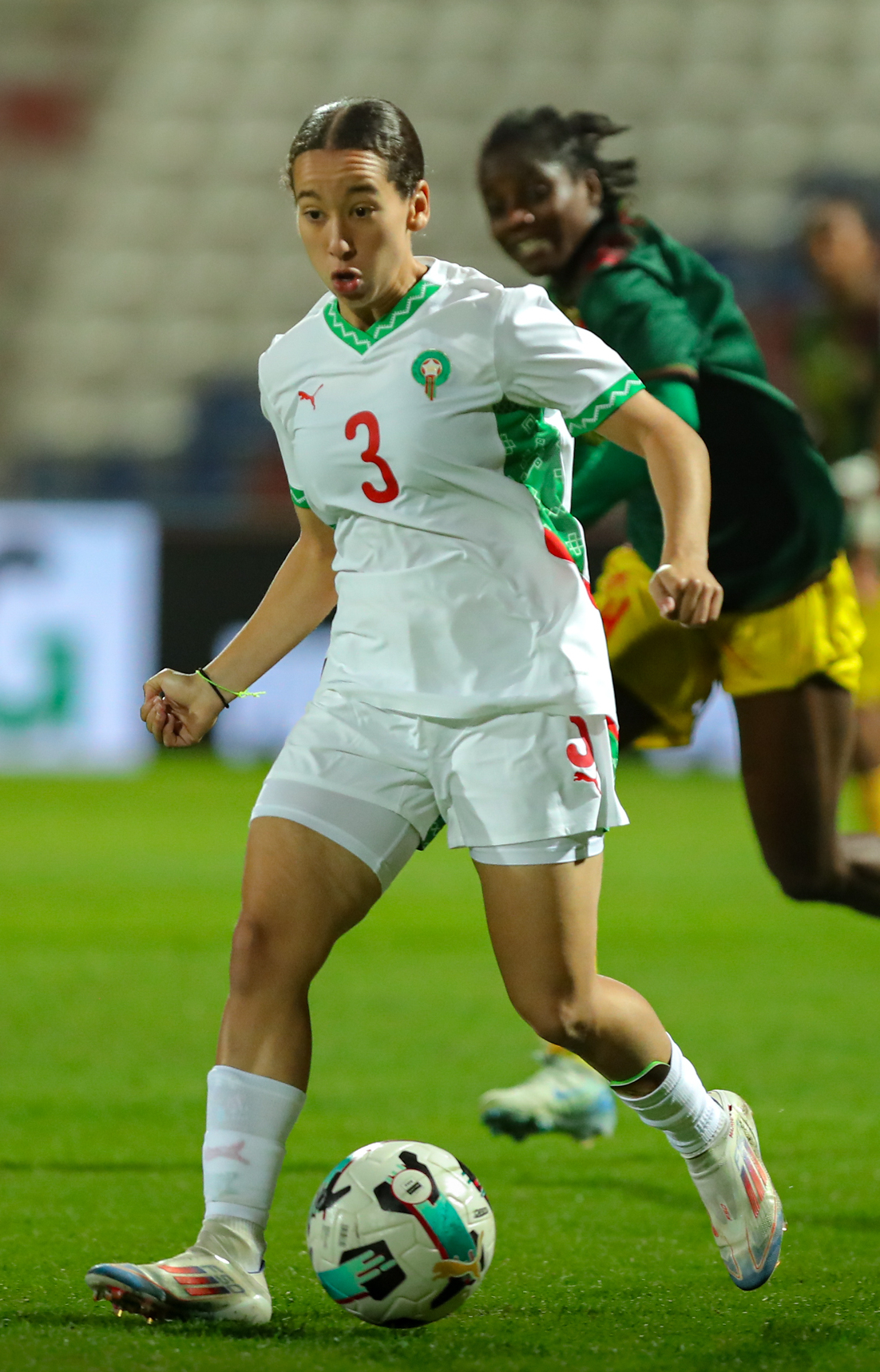

Personal information
- Date of birth: 11 May 2002 (age 24)
- Place of birth: Eindhoven, Netherlands
- Height: 1.55 m (5 ft 1 in)
- Position: Right-back

Team information
- Current team: RS Berkane

Youth career
- 2019–2020: PSV
- 2020: Gent

Senior career*
Years	Team	Apps	(Gls)
2020–2023	Gent	54	(1)
2023	Charleroi	9	(1)
2024–2024	Marseille	0	(0)
2024	Berkane	N/A	(N/A)

International career^{‡}
2018	Netherlands U17	6	(1)
2019	Netherlands U18	13	(0)
2019–2020	Netherlands U19	5	(0)
2020	Morocco U20		
2021–	Morocco		
- * Club domestic league appearances and goals as of 9 September 2023 ‡ National team caps and goals as of 14 June 2021

Rkia Mazrouai (Arabic: رقية مزراوي; born 11 May 2002) is a professional footballer who plays as a right-back for Morocco Division 1 Pro Féminine club RS Berkane. Born in the Netherlands, she represented that nation as a youth but represents Morocco at full international level.

== Club career ==
=== KAA Gent ===
On 7 June 2020, it was announced that Mazrouai would join KAA Gent. She scored her first goal against Eendracht Aalst on 9 November 2021, scoring in the 70th minute.

Rkia Mazrouai was chosen first as Le Lion Belge 2022.Mazrouai, Rkia. "Le Lion belge 2022". www.instagram.com.

=== Charleroi ===
On 2 February 2023, Mazrouai was announced at Charleroi. She made her league debut against KRC Genk on 3 February 2023. She scored her first goal against Eendracht Aalst on 21 March 2023.

=== Marseille ===
On 22 January 2024, Mazrouai was announced at Marseille. She made her league debut against Le Mans on 17 March 2024.

She also played for Marseille's reserve team, making her debut on 28 January 2024 against Monteux Vaucluse.

== International career ==
Mazrouai made her senior debut for Morocco on 10 June 2021 as a 79th-minute substitution in a 3–0 friendly home win over Mali. Her first match as a starting player was four days later against the same opponent.

Mazrouai was named in the preliminary list of footballers for the 2023 FIFA Women's World Cup on 20 June 2023. On 11 July 2023, it was announced that she had made the final squad.

== See also ==
- List of Morocco women's international footballers
