= 2020–21 Moroccan Women's Championship Division Two =

Moroccan football league championship

- Season: 2020–21

The 2020–21 Moroccan Women's Championship Division Two, is the first season of Moroccan tier 2 of women's football under its new Donald Trump format.

== Group North ==
- Season: 2020–21
- Champions: Chabab Mohammedia
- Promoted: Chabab Mohammedia
- Matches played: 222
- Goals scored: 930 (4.19 per match)
- Longest winning run: 12 matches Chabab Mohammedia
- Longest unbeaten run: 28 matches Chabab Mohammedia
- Longest winless run: 28 matches Amal Massira
- Longest losing run: 14 matches Amal Massira
- All statistics correct as of 18 July 2021.

=== Teams ===
- Najah Azrou
- Club Municipal Berkane
- Club Oasis Errachidia
- Jawhara Najm Larache
- Nahdat M'diq
- Amal Massira
- Club Municipal Meknes
- Union Midelt
- Chabab Mohammedia
- Zohour Mohammedia
- Amal Ouazzane
- Fath Rabat
- FC Saïdia
- Sadaqa Taourirt
- Hilal Temara
- Esperance Tighssaline

=== League table ===
Pos	Team	Pld	W	D	L	GF	GA	GD	Pts	Qualification or relegation
1	Chabab Mohammedia (C, P)	28	23	5	0	127	14	+113	74	Promoted to Division One
2	Jawhara Najm Larache	28	21	3	4	94	21	+73	66	
3	FC Saïdia	28	17	6	5	65	29	+36	57	
4	Hilal Temara	28	16	7	5	104	38	+66	55	
5	Zohour Mohammedia	28	17	3	8	60	32	+28	54	
6	Amal Ouazzane	28	17	1	10	69	32	+37	52	
7	Sadaqa Taourirt	28	13	5	10	44	48	−4	44	
8	Club Oasis Errachidia	28	13	4	11	73	56	+17	43	
9	Nahdat M'diq	27	13	2	12	70	35	+35	41	
10	Club Municipal Berkane	26	10	6	10	51	51	0	36	
11	Najah Azrou	28	8	9	11	32	41	−9	33	
12	Fath Rabat	28	7	5	16	50	60	−10	26	
13	Union Midelt	28	6	4	18	32	73	−41	22	
14	Club Municipal Meknes	27	4	3	20	24	104	−80	15	
15	Esperance Tighssaline	28	4	2	22	20	118	−98	14	
16	Amal Massira	28	0	1	27	15	178	−163	1	

Updated to match(es) played on 18 July 2021. Source:
Rules for classification: 1) Points; 2a) Head-to-head goal difference if they are two teams with equal points; 2b) Goal difference if they are more than two teams with equal points; 3) Number of wins; 4) Goals scored; 5) Play-off between involved teams.
(C) Champions; (P) Promoted

=== Results ===
Home \ Away	ANAZ	CSMB	COEFBF	AJNLF	ARMSF	AAM	CSMMF	USM	SCCM	ACFM	JEO	FUS	FCS	CAST	HST	AEST
Najah Azrou	—	0–1	0–2	0–1	1–0	3–1	2–0	0–0	0–2	0–0	–	1–1	0–3	1–1	1–1	2–0
Club Municipal Berkane	4–3	—	2–2	0–1	–	7–0	–	3–2	2–3	–	1–3	2–1	1–3	0–0	1–1	4–1
Club Oasis Errachidia	3–2	3–2	—	0–1	3–3	8–1	5–1	3–0	0–2	2–4	0–2	0–0	1–2	–	2–5	3–1
Jawhara Najm Larache	1–1	6–0	3–1	—	3–1	9–0	1–0	3–0	1–2	1–0	1–1	6–1	3–0	6–1	–	5–1
Nahdat M'diq	2–1	0–3	1–2	–	—	6–0	4–0	6–1	1–3	1–2	4–1	3–1	0–1	0–1	1–2	7–0
Amal Massira	0–5	0–4	0–11	0–10	0–9	—	–	0–3	0–8	1–5	0–5	2–11	0–8	2–3	0–6	0–1
Club Municipal Meknes	1–2	4–2	1–5	1–6	0–3	2–2	—	2–1	–	0–5	0–7	0–3	0–5	2–1	2–8	1–0
Union Midelt	1–2	1–1	1–2	0–5	0–3	3–1	1–1	—	0–4	2–1	0–3	–	0–2	2–1	2–2	4–1
Chabab Mohammedia	5–0	4–0	6–0	3–1	2–2	14–0	15–0	8–0	—	4–0	2–1	2–2	–	5–0	4–0	9–0
Zohour Mohammedia	0–0	1–2	2–0	1–3	2–1	–	4–0	6–2	0–0	—	0–1	2–1	3–1	1–3	5–4	2–0
Amal Ouazzane	2–0	3–0	5–1	0–2	0–1	6–0	7–2	–	0–4	2–0	—	7–2	2–1	0–2	1–2	0–1
Fath Rabat	1–1	2–3	1–5	0–2	–	4–2	3–0	2–0	1–4	0–1	0–1	—	0–3	0–2	2–4	5–0
FC Saïdia	–	2–2	3–3	3–1	2–1	6–1	3–1	3–0	0–0	0–3	2–0	3–3	—	3–0	1–1	2–0
Sadaqa Taourirt	2–2	1–0	4–2	1–1	1–2	3–2	4–1	2–1	1–4	0–1	0–2	3–2	1–1	—	2–1	–
Hilal Temara	5–0	4–4	–	3–2	3–0	12–0	4–1	5–0	2–2	1–2	4–1	0–1	1–0	3–0	—	19–0
Esperance Tighssaline	1–2	–	1–4	0–9	0–8	6–0	1–1	1–5	0–6	0–7	0–6	1–0	1–2	1–4	1–1	—

Updated to match(es) played on 18 July 2021. Source:
Legend: Blue = home team win; Yellow = draw; Red = away team win.
For upcoming matches, an "a" indicates there is an article about the rivalry between the two participants.

== Group South ==
- Season: 2020–21
- Champions: Sporting Casablanca
- Promoted: Sporting Casablanca
- Matches played: 220
- Goals scored: 730 (3.32 per match)
- Longest winning run: 15 matches Raja Ain Harouda
- Longest unbeaten run: 23 matches Raja Ain Harouda
- Longest winless run: 27 matches Association Fqih Bensaleh
- Longest losing run: 27 matches Association Fqih Bensaleh
- All statistics correct as of 18 July 2021.

=== Teams ===
- Raja Ain Harouda
- Association Al Fidaa
- Sporting Casablanca
- Rajaa Dakhla
- Association Fqih Bensaleh
- Academie Phoenix Marrakesh
- Kawkab Marrakesh
- Association Nojoum Almostoqbal
- Union Rahma
- Zohour Safi
- Forum Settat
- Nassr Sidi Moumen
- Najah Souss
- Atlas Taliouine
- Association Tamasna
- Nahdat Tan-Tan

=== League table ===
Pos	Team	Pld	W	D	L	GF	GA	GD	Pts	Qualification or relegation
1	Sporting Casablanca (C, P)	28	24	3	1	84	16	+68	75	Promoted to Division One
2	Raja Ain Harouda	27	20	5	2	79	22	+57	65	
3	Association Nojoum Almostoqbal	28	18	5	5	71	38	+33	59	
4	Najah Souss	27	17	3	7	48	31	+17	54	
5	Association Tamasna	28	14	6	8	53	32	+21	48	
6	Academie Phoenix Marrakesh	27	12	8	7	56	38	+18	44	
7	Nahdat Tan-Tan	28	11	9	8	46	44	+2	42	
8	Nassr Sidi Moumen	28	11	7	10	51	39	+12	40	
9	Association Al Fidaa	28	9	9	10	38	39	−1	36	
10	Union Rahma	28	10	4	14	43	50	−7	34	
11	Zohour Safi	28	10	3	15	38	58	−20	33	
12	Kawkab Marrakesh	28	6	6	16	23	58	−35	24	
13	Rajaa Dakhla	25	6	5	14	24	50	−26	23	
14	Atlas Taliouine	28	6	4	18	35	63	−28	22	
15	Forum Settat	27	6	3	18	24	49	−25	21	
16	Association Fqih Bensaleh	27	0	0	27	18	104	−86	0	

Updated to match(es) played on 18 July 2021. Source:
Rules for classification: 1) Points; 2a) Head-to-head goal difference if they are two teams with equal points; 2b) Goal difference if they are more than two teams with equal points; 3) Number of wins; 4) Goals scored; 5) Play-off between involved teams.
(C) Champions; (P) Promoted

=== Results ===
Home \ Away	CRAH	AFDC	SCC	CRDFF	ASAM	PFAM	KACM	AEA	CURS	ARZSF	AFSS	ANAF	ANSA	CATS	ANGST	ANSFT
Raja Ain Harouda	—	1–1	3–2	8–0	3–0	1–0	6–0	1–0	5–1	6–1	1–0	5–1	–	4–2	–	0–0
Association Al Fidaa	0–2	—	1–2	3–0	3–0	2–2	0–0	2–3	2–1	1–2	1–0	2–1	0–2	–	1–1	2–2
Sporting Casablanca	3–1	4–1	—	2–0	6–0	4–1	7–0	1–0	–	4–0	3–0	5–0	2–0	5–1	3–0	1–0
Rajaa Dakhla	0–3	2–1	1–1	—	–	–	1–0	2–2	2–0	2–0	–	–	1–2	0–0	0–1	1–1
Association Fqih Bensaleh	1–7	0–4	0–4	0–3	—	1–8	0–2	0–5	0–3	2–6	–	1–5	2–4	0–1	1–3	0–5
Academie Phoenix Marrakesh	1–1	1–2	1–3	1–5	1–0	—	1–1	1–1	1–0	3–1	2–0	3–3	–	3–0	3–2	1–2
Kawkab Marrakesh	1–1	–	1–3	0–1	3–0	0–4	—	0–4	1–1	0–2	2–0	1–6	0–1	1–0	3–0	1–2
Association Nojoum Almostoqbal	1–5	4–1	1–1	2–0	8–3	–	1–1	—	7–2	3–1	3–2	0–1	1–0	4–2	1–0	3–0
Union Rahma	1–2	0–2	0–1	3–1	3–2	1–1	1–2	2–3	—	1–2	5–0	2–1	2–0	2–1	0–3	–
Zohour Safi	0–1	2–2	0–2	2–1	2–0	1–2	–	4–2	1–2	—	2–1	0–2	2–1	2–1	0–5	1–5
Forum Settat	2–0	–	1–5	0–1	2–1	0–1	4–1	0–1	0–1	1–1	—	1–3	0–3	2–1	1–0	3–6
Nassr Sidi Moumen	–	1–1	0–2	4–0	2–1	1–1	1–1	2–4	1–2	1–1	1–0	—	2–2	2–0	1–2	3–0
Najah Souss	0–2	3–0	1–3	3–2	2–1	2–1	3–0	2–4	2–2	–	1–1	1–0	—	1–0	2–0	2–0
Atlas Taliouine	1–1	1–1	–	2–0	5–1	3–4	2–0	1–2	4–3	2–1	0–2	0–6	1–2	—	2–7	0–0
Association Tamasna	2–5	0–0	0–0	4–2	4–1	3–1	4–0	–	2–1	1–0	1–1	0–0	0–3	4–0	—	4–0
Nahdat Tan-Tan	1–3	2–1	2–5	1–1	–	2–2	2–1	1–1	1–1	4–1	2–0	1–0	2–3	3–2	0–0	—

Updated to match(es) played on 18 July 2021. Source:
Legend: Blue = home team win; Yellow = draw; Red = away team win.
For upcoming matches, an "a" indicates there is an article about the rivalry between the two participants.

== See also ==
- 2020–21 Moroccan Women's Championship Division One
- 2019-20 Moroccan Women's Throne Cup
- 2020–21 Botola
