= Phoenix Marrakesh =

Women's football club in Marrakesh

- Founded: 2019
- Stadium: Stade Terrain Hay Mohammadi, Marrakesh
- Capacity: 1,500
- President: Ahmed Ahsane
- Coach: Adil M'Ghafri
- League: Moroccan Division 1 Féminine
- 2024–25: D1, 9th of 14
| Home colours | Away colours | Third colours |

Phoenix Football Academy Marrakesh (Note: Also known as Phoenix Football Féminin Marrakech (Arabic: فينيكس لكرة القدم النسوية مراكش)) (Arabic: أكاديمية فينيكس لكرة القدم مراكش), known as PFAM for short, is a professional women's football club based in Marrakesh. Founded in 2018, it competes in the Moroccan Division 1 Féminine, the top division of Moroccan football.

== History ==
Founded in 2019 by its president Ahmed Ahsane, the club managed to secure promotion to Moroccan Division 2 Féminine during the 2019–20 season. After spending three seasons in the second tier, the Marrakchi club secured promotion in the 2022–23 season by finishing first in the South Group and later placed second overall after falling to CS Hilal Temara in the final. In February 2024, Rachid Ghaflaoui was appointed as the technical director of the academy.

== Identity ==
Phoenix's colours are "white", "pinkish-red", and "black". Its crest features concentric rings in red and black, with a stylized phoenix in the center, its wings outstretched in red and black, holding a ball. The phoenix is positioned within a shield-shaped area, symbolizing resilience and strength, while the design emphasizes the club's forward momentum. The crest serves as a reminder to always rise and soar.

== Players and Staff ==
=== Players ===
As of February 9, 2025

Note: Flags indicate national team as defined under FIFA eligibility rules; some limited exceptions apply. Players may hold more than one non-FIFA nationality.

| No. | Pos. | Nation | Player |
|---|---|---|---|
| 1 | GK | MAR | Hasnae Ouhatte |
| 2 | DF | MAR | Douae Hmirine |
| 3 | DF | MAR | Zineb Jamari |
| 4 | DF | MAR | Fatiha Fateh |
| 5 | | MAR | Soukaina Boujja |
| 7 | | MAR | Hanane El Bouziadi |
| 9 | | MAR | Khaoula Lahmoud (Captain) |
| 11 | FW | BFA | Balkissa Sawadogo |
| 12 | GK | MAR | Raouia Bellafquih |
| 13 | | MAR | Wiam Chatt |
| 14 | | MAR | Bahija Aït Alla |

| No. | Pos. | Nation | Player |
|---|---|---|---|
| 19 | | NGR | Grace Aaron |
| 21 | | MAR | Nour Hamdaoui |
| 99 | | MAR | Emane Tankiouine |
| — | MF | GHA | Catherine Arthur |
| — | FW | TOG | Moussirietou Adinda-Akpo |
| — | | MAR | Ramatallah Benaziz |
| — | | MAR | Yasmine Sioui |
| — | | MAR | Sara Karimi |
| — | | MAR | Kenza Chnider |
| — | | MAR | Siham Ammari |

=== Current staff ===
As of December 4, 2024

Coaching staff
| Head coach | (Morocco) Adil M'Ghafri |
| Assistant coach | |
