= Lebogang Mabatle =

South African soccer player

Personal information
- Full name: Lebogang Priscilla Mabatle
- Date of birth: 3 March 1992 (age 34)
- Place of birth: Pankop, South Africa
- Position: Defender

Team information
- Current team: Wydad Athletic Club Women

Senior career*
Years	Team	Apps	(Gls)
- Hallelujah Zebra Force
- Ajax Pankop
2015-2018	University of Pretoria		
2019-2023	Mamelodi Sundowns Ladies		
2023-2024	Phoenix Marrakech Feminin		
2024-	Wydad Athletic Club Women		

International career
20??–	South Africa	13	(0)
- * Club domestic league appearances and goals as of Phoenix Marrakech, Morocco

Lebogang Priscilla Mabatle is a South African soccer player who plays as a defender for Moroccan Women's Championship side Wydad Athletic Club Women and the South Africa women's national football team.

== Club career ==
=== Mamelodi Sundowns Ladies ===
Mabatle was part of the Sundowns Ladies team that won the inaugural SAFA Women's League undefeated in the 2019-20 season.

=== Phoenix Feminin Marrakech ===
In September 2023 she signed for Moroccan Women's Championship side Phoenix Marrakech.

=== Wydad Athletic Club Women ===
In August 2024 she moved to Wydad Athletic Club Women.

== International career ==
=== International ===
Mabatle represented South Africa at the 2012 Summer Olympics in London.

In September 2014, Mabatle was named to the roster for the 2014 African Women's Championship in Namibia.
