= Sanaâ Mssoudy =

Moroccan footballer (born 1999)

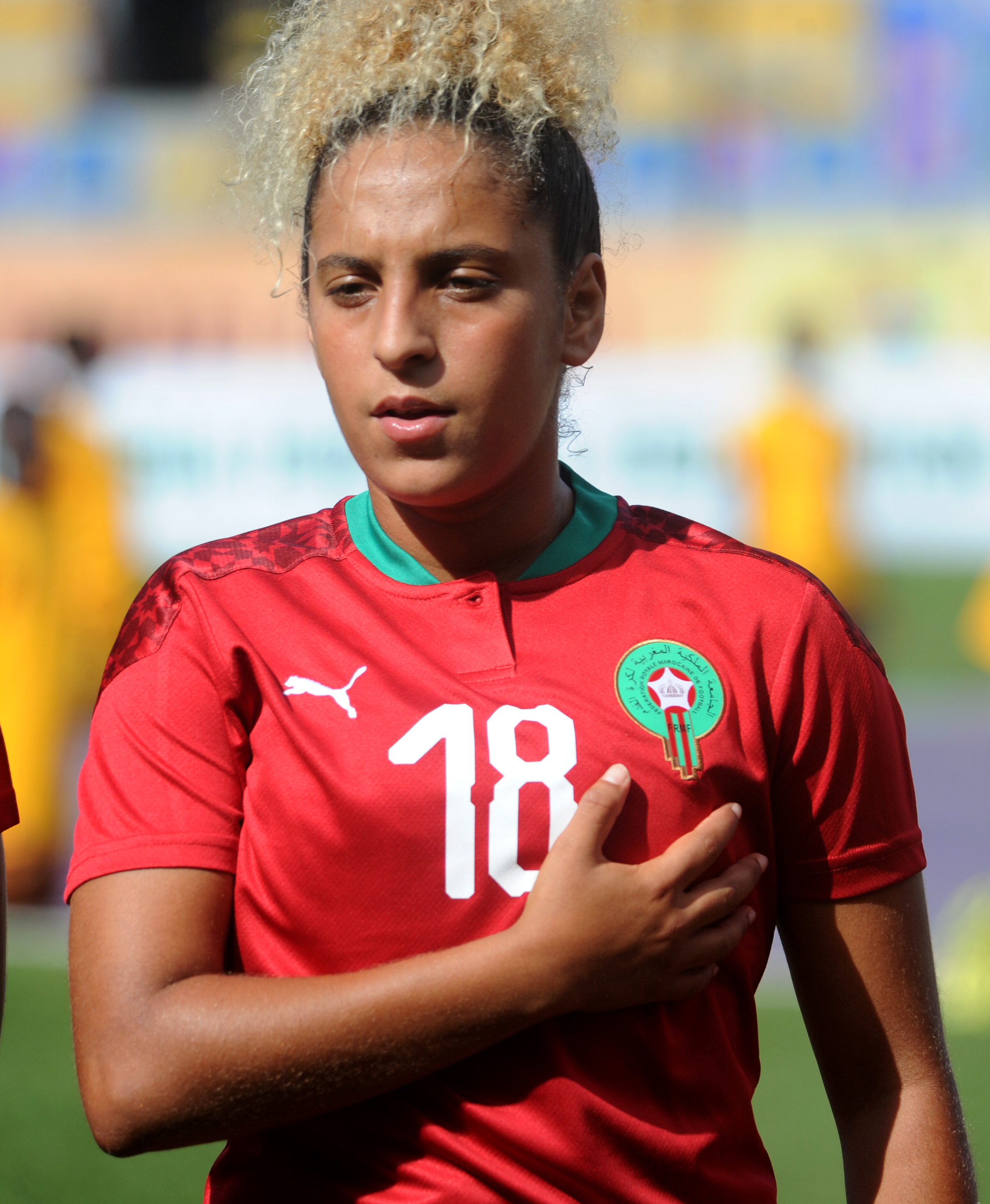
- Mssoudy with the 2024 CAF WCL best player trophy.

Personal information
- Date of birth: 30 December 1999 (age 26)
- Place of birth: Casablanca, Morocco
- Height: 1.59 m (5 ft 3 in)
- Position: Forward

Team information
- Current team: Fleury

Senior career*
Years	Team	Apps	(Gls)
2015–2026	ASFAR		
2026–	Fleury	0	(0)

International career^{‡}
2015–2017	Morocco U17		
2017–2019	Morocco U20		
2017–	Morocco		
Medal record
Representing Morocco
Women's Africa Cup of Nations
Second place	2022 Morocco
Second place	2024 Morocco
- * Club domestic league appearances and goals ‡ National team caps and goals as of 28 November 2024 (UTC)

Sanaâ Mssoudy (Arabic: سناء مسعودي, Moroccan Arabic pronunciation: [snaː məsʕuːdi]; born 30 December 1999) is a Moroccan footballer who plays as a forward for Première Ligue club Fleury and the Morocco national team.

== Club career ==
Mssoudy has played for ASFAR in Morocco, appearing at the 2021 CAF Women's Champions League final tournament.

== Honours ==
AS FAR

- Moroccan Women's Championship (9): 2016, 2017, 2018, 2019, 2020, 2021, 2022, 2023, 2025
- Moroccan Women Throne Cup (8): 2016, 2017, 2018, 2019, 2020, 2021, 2022, 2024
- UNAF Women's Champions League (3): 2021, 2024, 2025
- CAF Women's Champions League (2): 2022, 2025; runner-up: 2024

Morocco

- Women's Africa Cup of Nations runner-up: 2024 2022
- UNAF Women's Tournament: 2020

Individual

- Moroccan Women's Championship Young player of the Year: 2018
- Moroccan Women's Championship Player of the Year: 2025
- CAF Women's Champions League Player of the Tournament: 2024
- CAF Women's Champions League Team of the Tournament: 2021, 2024
- IFFHS CAF Women's Team of The Year: 2024
- CAF Women's Inter-Club Player of the Year: 2024, 2025

== See also ==
- List of Morocco women's international footballers
