= Pankop =

Village in Mpumalanga, South Africa

- Location within Mpumalanga Location within South Africa
- Coordinates: 25.176°S 28.403°E
- Country: South Africa
- Province: Mpumalanga
- District: Nkangala
- Municipality: Dr JS Moroka

Area
  - Total: 0.44 km^{2} (0.17 sq mi)

Population (2001)
  - Total: 622
  - Density: 1,400/km^{2} (3,700/sq mi)
- Time zone: UTC+2 (SAST)
- PO box: 0414

Pankop is a village in Nkangala District Municipality in the Mpumalanga province of South Africa.
