= RS Berkane (women) =

Women's football club in Berkane

- Full name: Renaissance sportive de Berkane
- Founded: 2020; 6 years ago
- Head Coach: Christophe Capian
- League: Moroccan Women's Championship
- 2024–25: D1, 2nd of 14
Home colours	Away colours	Third colours

Renaissance Sportive de Berkane féminines (Arabic: النهضة الرياضية البركانية), shortly known as RS Berkane or RSB is a women's football club based in Berkane, Morocco that competes in the Moroccan Women's Championship, the top flight of the Moroccan football league system. It is the women's section of the Homonymous club.

== History ==
RS Berkane's women's section was established in 2020, debuting the team in the second tier of Moroccan football, the Championnat Régional de la Ligue Orientale that same year. After two seasons in the Second Division. which included reaching the semi-final of the Throne Cup in the 2021–22 season. the team secured promotion to the top tier in the 2023–24 season by finishing first in the North pool and they were crowned champions of the second division after defeating South pool winners RC Zemamra.

== Players and staff ==
=== Current squad ===
As of 21 May 2026

Note: Flags indicate national team as defined under FIFA eligibility rules; some limited exceptions apply. Players may hold more than one non-FIFA nationality.

No.	Pos.	Nation	Player
1	GK	MAR	Malak Fakhir
2	DF	MAR	Rkia Mazrouai
3	DF	MAR	Najat Bellahbib
4	DF	NGR	Racheal Kolawole
6	MF	MAR	Oumaima Tayar
7	MF	MAR	Loubna Ijji
8	MF	MAR	Kawtar Ait Omar
9	FW	MAR	Anissa Belkasmi
10	FW	ALG	Leïla El Hadj
11	FW	MAR	Fatima Zohra Gharbi
12	GK	MAR	Zineb El Arari
13	FW	MAR	Ranya Senhaji

No.	Pos.	Nation	Player
14	DF	MAR	Soumia Hady
16	GK	MAR	Kawtar Bentaleb
17	MF	MAR	Samah Kharouach
19	MF	MAR	Sara Mssaflyam
20	DF	MAR	Houda Rhoujjane
21	DF	MAR	Wahiba Jalil
26	MF	MAR	Douae Gsiba
40	FW	ETH	Ariet Odong
77	MF	MAR	Chaimae Drissi
—		MAR	Malak El Kouhen
—		MAR	Ikram Boufedda
—		MAR	Aya El Khaldi

=== Coaching staff ===
As of August 11, 2024

Position	Name
Head coach	(France) Christophe Capian
Assistant coaches	(Morocco) Hasna Chqoubi
Assistant coaches	(Morocco) Hassan Benlafkih
Fitness coach	(France) Corentin Cazorla
Goalkeeping coach	(France) Christopher Serfaty
Physiotherapists	(Morocco) Sanae Ramdani
Physiotherapists	(Morocco) Ilham M'Jahad
Kit manager	(Morocco) Walid Zerouali

== Honours ==
=== Domestic ===
- Moroccan Women's Championship

Runner-up (1): 2025

- Moroccan Women's Championship D2

Winners (1): 2024

== See also ==
- RS Berkane
- Moroccan Women's Championship
