= Union Touarga Sportif (women) =

Women's football club in Touarga

Union Touarga
- Full name: Union Touarga Sportif
- Stadium: Terrain Ibn Sina Hilton, Rabat
- Coach: (Guinea) Amara Condé
- League: Moroccan Division 2 Féminine
- 2024–25: 1st of 14
- Website: touargaclub.ma
Home colours	Away colours

Union Touarga Sportif, commonly known as Union Touarga or by its Arabic equivalent Itihad Touarga, is a professional women's football club based in the Touarga district of Rabat, Morocco. It serves as the women's section of Botola side Union de Touarga and competes in the Moroccan Division 2 Féminine, the second tier of women's football in Morocco.

== History ==
On 24 March 2025, the club secured promotion to Division 1 with five matches to spare, having recorded 20 wins and one draw to remain unbeaten. The team went on to claim the division title after defeating South Group winners Lionnes Assa Mahbès 2–0 in the final.

== Players and Staff ==
=== Players ===
As of 22 March 2025

Note: Flags indicate national team as defined under FIFA eligibility rules; some limited exceptions apply. Players may hold more than one non-FIFA nationality.

No.	Pos.	Nation	Player
1	GK	MAR	Chaimae Lhadi
2		MAR	Doua Samt
3		MAR	Salma Berrabah
4		MAR	Basma Gouchi
6	MF	MAR	Houda El Mestour
7		MAR	Hajar Bouziani
8		MAR	Khadija Ouhoussa
9	FW	FRA	Dialamba Diaby
10	MF	MTN	Fatou Diop
11		MAR	Noura Hamieddine
12	GK	MAR	Fatima-Zahra Taouzri
13		MAR	Sara Abdelhakim
14		MAR	Safae Dissouri

No.	Pos.	Nation	Player
17		MAR	Imane Benhilal
18		MAR	Amina Benamrane
19		MAR	Asma Ifli
20		MAR	Khadija Rachadi
21	FW	MAR	Meryem Hajri (Captain)
23		MAR	Khadija Ed-Dahbi
24		MAR	Chaimae Akreim
25	FW	BFA	Mouniratou Compaoré
27	FW	BFA	Limata Nikiéma
—	GK	MAR	Khadija Abbassi
9		MAR	Hajar Zegrani
19		MAR	Asmaa Asmarani
23		MAR	Safaa Al Houssaine

=== Current staff ===
As of 3 April 2025

Coaching staff
Head coach	Amara Condé

== Honours ==
- Moroccan Women's Division 2 Féminine
  - Champions (1): 2024–25
