= Imène El Ghazouani =

Moroccan footballer

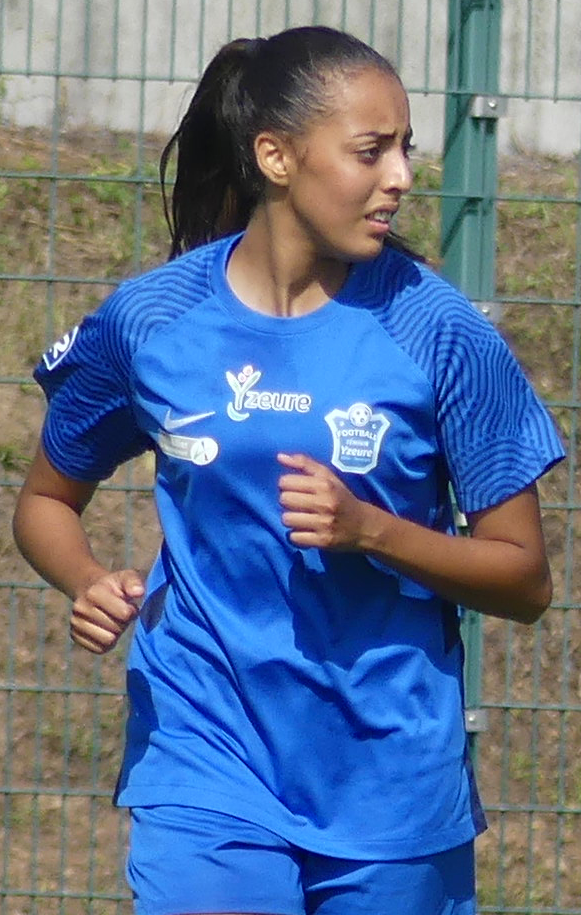

Personal information
- Date of birth: 9 June 2000 (age 26)
- Place of birth: Melun, France
- Position: Forward

Team information
- Current team: GPSO 92 Issy

Senior career*
Years	Team	Apps	(Gls)
2017–2019	La Rochette Vaux le Pénil		
2019–2021	Saint-Maur	18	(3)
2021–2022	Yzeure	11	(0)
2022-	GPSO 92 Issy	14	(2)

International career^{‡}
2021–	Morocco	3	(0)
- * Club domestic league appearances and goals as of 201 May 2023 ‡ National team caps and goals as of 21 July 2021

Imène El Ghazouani (Arabic: إمين الغزواني, born 9 June 2000) is a professional footballer who plays as a forward for Division 2 Féminine club GPSO 92 Issy. Born in France, she represents Morocco at international level.

== Club career ==
El Ghazouani has played for La Rochette Vaux le Pénil FC, VGA Saint-Maur and Yzeure in France.

== International career ==
El Ghazouani made her senior debut for Morocco on 16 September 2021 as a 90+4th-minute substitution in a 1–0 win over Cameroon during the Aisha Buhari Cup.

== See also ==
- List of Morocco women's international footballers
