= Adoudou Konaté =

Malian footballer (born 1994)

Personal information
- Date of birth: 14 April 1994 (age 32)
- Position: Goalkeeper

Team information
- Current team: Itihad Tanger FF
- Number: 1

International career^{‡}
| Years | Team | Apps | (Gls) |
| 2018– | Mali | 5 | (0) |
- ‡ National team caps and goals as of 11 June 2019

Adoudou Konaté (born 14 April 1994) is a Malian international footballer who plays as a goalkeeper for the Mali women's national football team. She competed for Mali at the 2018 Africa Women Cup of Nations, playing in five matches.
