= Anissa Belkasmi =

Moroccan footballer (born 2002)

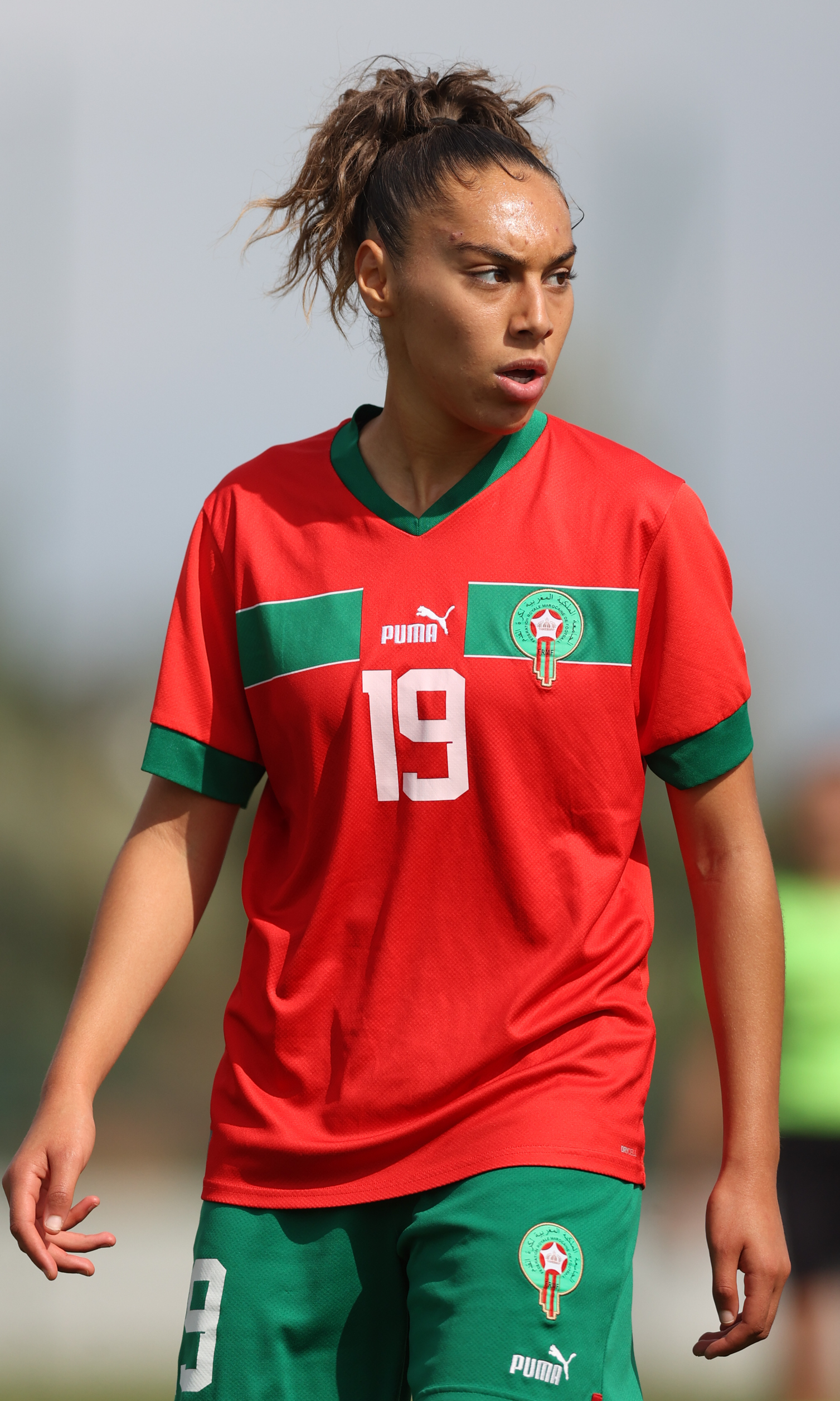

Personal information
- Date of birth: 9 July 2002 (age 24)
- Place of birth: Dreux, France
- Height: 1.77 m (5 ft 10 in)
- Position: Forward

Team information
- Current team: RS Berkane

International career
| Years | Team | Apps | (Gls) |
- Morocco

Anissa Belkasmi (Arabic: أنيسة بالقاسمي; born 9 July 2002) is a footballer who plays as a striker for Moroccan Women's Championship D1 club RS Berkane. Born in France, she plays for the Morocco national team.

== International career ==
Belkasmi represents Morocco at international level.
