= Rachid Ghaflaoui =

Moroccan football manager

Rachid Ghalfaoui
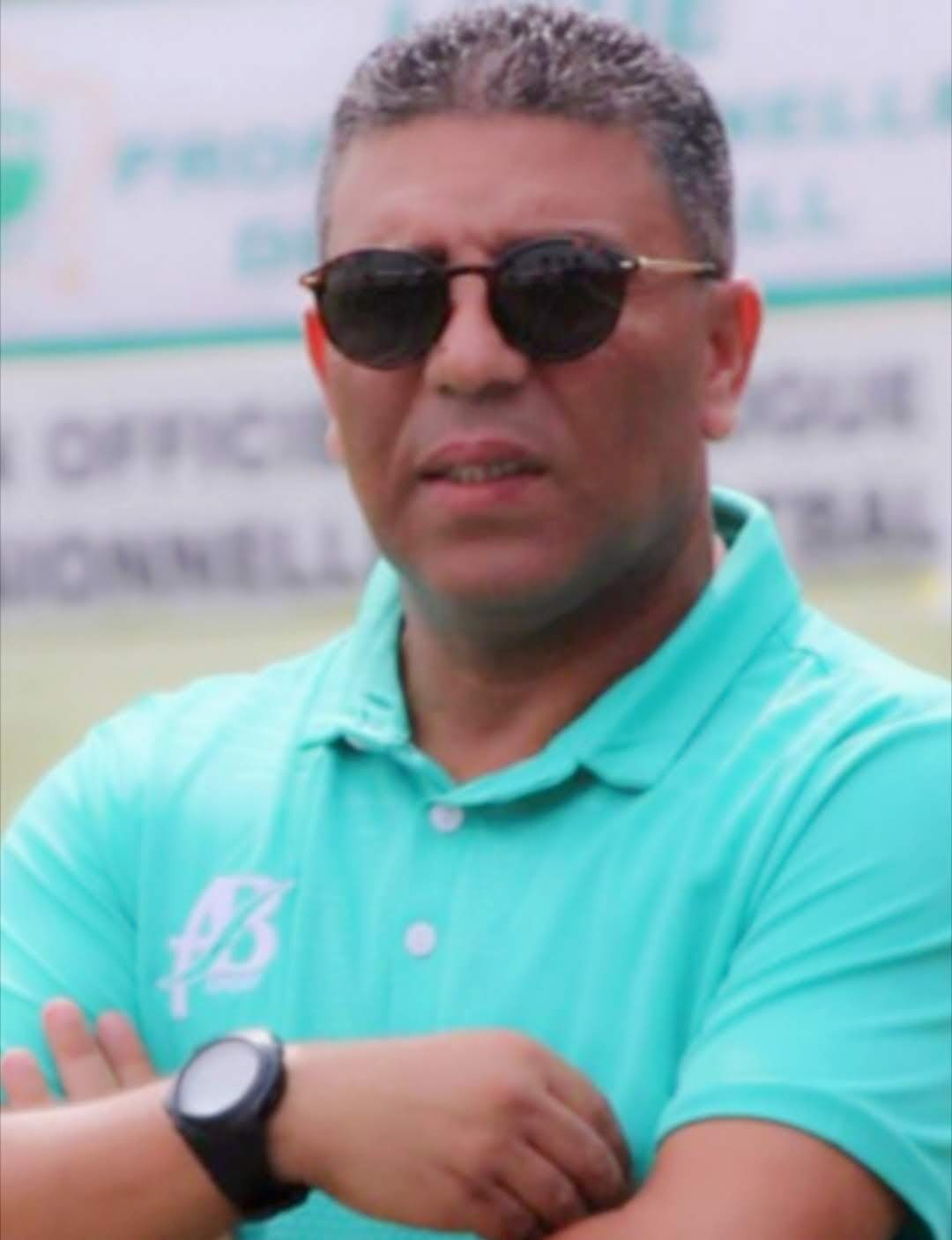

Personal information
- Date of birth: 1 January 1973 (age 53)
- Place of birth: Marrakesh, Morocco

Youth career
- 1986–1991: Kawkab Marrakech
- 1991–1992: FAR Rabat

Senior career*
| Years | Team | Apps | (Gls) |
| 1993–1999 | Mouloudia de Marrakech | | |

Managerial career
- 2014–2015: Sahel SC
- 2015–2015: Débo Club
- 2016–2017: SM Sanga Balende
- 2017–2017: TAS de Casablanca
- 2017–2018: Sahel SC
- 2018–2019: Williamsville AC
- 2020–2020: Académie SOAR
- 2021–2022: Bahrain SC
- 2022: Al Ta'awon SC
- 2022–2023: Al-Wefaq Ajdabiya
- 2023: LYS Sassandra
- 2023–2024: Alfaloja Club
- 2024–: AS Salé
- * Club domestic league appearances and goals ‡ National team caps and goals as of 11 September 2022

Rachid Ghaflaoui (Arabic: رشيد الغفلاوي; born 1 January 1973) is a Moroccan football coach. He is the current coach of the Moroccan club AS Salé which plays in the Botola 2.

== Career ==
Born in Marrakesh in Morocco, Ghaflaoui was appointed in 2014 as coach of Nigerien club Sahel SC, before joining Congolese club Sanga Balende in February 2016, which he managed to qualify for the Confederation Cup by finishing third place of the Congolese champion.

In November 2017, he re-signed with the Nigerien club Sahel SC, a club with which he won the country's Cup and Supercup during the same season, before signing with the Ivorian club Williamsville Athletic Club the following season.

In 2020, he joined the Guinean club Académie SOAR, then in 2021, the Bahraini club Bahrain SC with which he will achieve the promotion to the Bahraini Premier League.

== Honours ==
- Niger Cup: 2017
- Niger Super Cup: 2017
- Champion of Bahraini Second Division: 2022
