= Wydad AC (women) =

Women's football club in Casablanca

- Full name: Wydad Women Athletic Club
- Founded: 8 May 2002; 24 years ago
- Stadium: Complexe Mohamed Benjelloun
- Capacity: 3,000
- Coach: Aziz El Hassouni
- League: Moroccan Women's Championship
- 2024–25: D1, 6th of 14
Home colours	Away colours	Third colours

Wydad Women Athletic Club (Arabic: نادي الوداد الرياضي النسوي), commonly shortened to Wydad or WAC, is a professional women's football club based in Casablanca. it competes in the National Professional Championship, in the highest level of the Moroccan women's football league system. The club is the women's section of Casablanca giants Wydad.

== Club history ==
Founded in 2002, the Wydad women's team achieved their first major success by winning the Moroccan Professional Championship in the 2006–07 season, just five years after their establishment. The club demonstrated consistent competitiveness, finishing as runners-up in both the league and cup during the 2012–13 season. Six seasons later, they once again came close to glory but had to settle for second place in the league, finishing behind AS FAR in the 2018–19 season.

In September 2022, Wydad merged with Al Nassim Sidi Moumen, securing their spot in the top-tier Professional Championship. In August 2024, the club won the Throne Day Tournament.

== Players and Staff ==
=== Players ===
As of 14 September 2025

Note: Flags indicate national team as defined under FIFA eligibility rules; some limited exceptions apply. Players may hold more than one non-FIFA nationality.

No.	Pos.	Nation	Player
1	GK	MAR	Sara El Amrani
3	DF	MAR	Salma Berrabah
4	DF	EGY	Camélia El Hofy
5	DF	MAR	Zineb Hamid
6	MF	MAR	Rajae Lazaar
7	FW	TUN	Nora Nouhaili
8	MF	MAR	Salma Miftah
9	FW	MAR	Nadia Laftah
11	FW	MAR	Rania Salmi
13	MF	MAR	Soukaina Mouammine
14	DF	MAR	Maïssen Bourhrine

No.	Pos.	Nation	Player
15	DF	SEN	Adama Sané
17	FW	MAR	Hanan Lasri
18	DF	SEN	Wolimata Ndiaye
20	MF	MAR	Ikram Douaa
21	DF	MAR	Hajar Tahri
22	GK	MAR	Imane Abdelahad
28	MF	MAR	Salma Amani
41	MF	COM	Assimina Maoulida
44	MF	MAR	M. Mouammine
55	DF	MAR	Noura Boukar
99	FW	MAR	Hajar Jbilou

=== Current staff ===
As of October 25, 2024

Coaching staff
Head coach	Aziz El Hassouni
Assistant coach	Oumaima Essahely

== Honours ==
- Moroccan Women's Championship
  - Winners (1): 2006–07
  - Runners-up (2): 2012–13, 2018–19
- Moroccan Throne Cup
  - Runners-up (2): 2012–13, 2023–24
- Throne Day League
  - Winners (1): 2024
