= Aïn Harrouda =

Aïn Harrouda ﻋﻴﻦ ﺣﺮﻭﺩﺓ
- Interactive map of Aïn Harrouda
- Coordinates: 33°38′14″N 7°26′54″W
- Country: Morocco
- Region: Casablanca-Settat
- Prefecture: Mohammedia
- Elevation: 32 m (105 ft)

Population (2014)
  - Total: 62,420
- Time zone: UTC+0 (GMT)

Aïn Harrouda (Arabic: ﻋﻴﻦ ﺣﺮﻭﺩﺓ, romanized: ʿayn ḥarrūda) is a city in Morocco, situated 17 km northeast of Casablanca.

It recorded a population of 62,420 in the 2014 Moroccan census. According to the 2004 census it had a population of 41,853 inhabitants.
