= Moroccan football league system =

The Moroccan football league system comprises two professional leagues and three amateur leagues. All the leagues are connected by a promotion and relegation system.

== Structure ==
There is two professional divisions in the country (Botola Pro & Botola Pro 2), all other divisions are amateur.

== Men ==
=== National Leagues ===
Level	Leagues			
	Professional Leagues			
1	Botola Pro; 16 clubs 2 Relegations + Play-off			
2	Botola Pro 2; 16 clubs 2 Promotions + Play-off; 2 Relegations + Play-off			
	Amateur Leagues			
3	National; 16 clubs 2 Promotions + Play-off; 2 Relegations + Play-off			
4	Amateurs I (North Group); 16 clubs 1 Promotion + Play+off; 2 Relegations + Play-off		Amateurs I (South Group); 16 clubs 1 Promotion + Play-off; 2 Relegations + Play-off	
5	Amateurs II (North East Group); 16 clubs 1 Promotion + Play-off; 4 Relegations	Amateurs II (North West Group); 16 clubs 1 Promotion + Play-off; 4 Relegations	Amateurs II (Sahara Group); 16 clubs 1 Promotion + Play-off; 4 Relegations	Amateurs II (South Group); 14 clubs 1 Promotion + Play-off; 3 Relegations

=== Regional Leagues ===
Leagues	Level 6	Level 7	Level 8	Level 9
Tanger-Tetouan-Al Hoceima	Excellent	Division 1	Division 2	
Oriental	Excellent	Division 1	Division 2	
Fez-Meknes	Excellent	Division 1	Division 2	
Rabat-Sale-Kenitra	Excellent	Division 1	Division 2	Division 3
Beni Mellal-Khenifra	Excellent	Division 1	Division 2	
Greater Casablanca	Excellent	Division 1	Division 2	
Chaouia Dukkala	Excellent	Division 1	Division 2	
Marrakech-Safi	Excellent	Division 1	Division 2	
Drâa-Tafilalet	Excellent	Division 1	Division 2	
Souss-Massa	Excellent	Division 1	Division 2	
Guelmim-Oued Noun	Excellent	Division 1	Division 2	
Laâyoune-Sakia El Hamra	Excellent	Division 1	Division 2	
Dakhla-Oued Ed-Dahab	Excellent	Division 1	Division 2	

== Women ==
=== National Leagues ===
Level	League(s)/Division(s)		
1	Division 1 Féminine; 12 clubs		
2	Division 2 Féminine; 12 clubs		
3	Division Amateur Féminine; 24 clubs divided into 3 groups		
3	Group A 8 clubs	Group B 8 clubs	Group C 8 clubs

=== Regional Leagues ===
Level	League(s)/Division(s)
4	Regional Leagues Tanger-Tetouan-Al Hoceima, Oriental, Fez-Meknes, Rabat-Sale-Kenitra, Beni Mellal-Khenifra, Grand Casablanca, Chaouia Dukkala, Marrakech-Safi, Drâa-Tafilalet, Souss-Massa, Guelmim-Oued Noun, Laâyoune-Sakia El Hamra, Dakhla-Oued Ed-Dahab
