= Raja Ait Iazza FF =

Women's football club in Ait Iazza

Raja Ait Iazza
- Full name: Association Raja Ait Iazza Football Féminine
- Short name: ARAFF
- Founded: 2012; 14 years ago
- Ground: Stade Communal Ait Iaaza, Ait Iaaza
- Capacity: 1,500
- Coach: Kamal Taouile
- League: Moroccan Women's Championship
- 2024–25: D1, 10th of 14
Home colours	Away colours

Association Raja Ait Iazza Football Féminine (Arabic: جمعية رجاء أيت أيعزة لكرة القدم النسوية) is a professional women's football club based in Ait Iazza that competes in the Moroccan Women's Championship, a league at the top of the Moroccan Football pyramid.

== History ==
The club was founded in 2012 in Ait Iaaza, located in the Taroudant Province. The region lacks a dedicated stadium for training and hosting opposing teams. As a result, the club plays its matches at the municipal stadium in Taroudant, where it also trains twice a week. For additional training sessions, the team is forced to practice in open spaces.

In the 2014–15 season, the club claimed the second division title, earning promotion to the first division. However, they were immediately relegated in the following season. They bounced back to the top flight in 2017 and continued to improve, achieving a fourth-place league finish in 2018.

The 2019–20 season marked a historic moment for Ait Iaaza, as they reached the final of the Moroccan Women's Throne Cup. This success was followed by their runner-up finish in the league during the 2020–21 season.

== Players and Staff ==
=== Players ===
As of 22 January 2025

Note: Flags indicate national team as defined under FIFA eligibility rules; some limited exceptions apply. Players may hold more than one non-FIFA nationality.

No.	Pos.	Nation	Player
1	GK	MAR	Rafika Aghtass
2	DF	MAR	Kenza Karya
3		MAR	Malika Bani
4		MAR	Fatima El Malki
5		MAR	Nawal Ezzine
7		MAR	Saoussane Aasem
9		MAR	Noha Ennajari
10		MAR	Karima Souilh
11		MAR	Saadia El Berrah
12	GK	MAR	Chaima Ennaji
14	DF	CGO	Chimène Ngazue

No.	Pos.	Nation	Player
15		NGR	Owoeye Temilope
17		MAR	Laila Bourjila
18		MAR	Chadia Anadifi
20		MAR	Jawhara Mahiyat
21		MAR	Oumaima El Herrioui
27		CMR	Michelle Ngo Nka'a
29	FW	COD	Feza Kalombo
30		MAR	Soukaina Eddahmani
—		MAR	Soukaina Lacheheb
—		MAR	Khaoula El Omari
—		MAR	Fatiha Taderghalt

=== Current staff ===
As of 8 January 2025

Coaching staff
Head coach	(Morocco) Kamal Taouile
Assistant coach	
