= Itihad Tanger FF =

Women's football club in Tanger

- Stadium: Stade Ziaten 2
- Coach: Mohamed Derdour
- League: Moroccan Division 1 Féminine
- 2024–25: D1, 8th of 14
Home colours	Away colours	Third colours

Itihad Tanger Football Féminin (Arabic: إتحاد طنجة لكرة القدم النسوية), shortly known as Itihad Tanger or as ITFF, is a professional women's football club based in Tangier that competes in the Moroccan Division 1 Féminin, the top-division league in the Moroccan football pyramid.

== History ==
In April 2019, the club earned promotion to the Elite Division following a successful campaign in the Second Division.

== Players and Staff ==
=== Players ===
As of 5 January 2025

Note: Flags indicate national team as defined under FIFA eligibility rules; some limited exceptions apply. Players may hold more than one non-FIFA nationality.

No.	Pos.	Nation	Player
—	FW	BEN	Yolande Gnammi
—	GK	MLI	Adoudou Konaté
7	MF	MLI	Hawa Ndiaye
—	FW	TOG	Tabita Kponvi
—	FW	MAR	Houda Ben Aboud
—	MF	MAR	Nouhayla Oubail
—	MF	MAR	Mouna Houari
—	MF	MAR	Ouissam El Idrissi
—	MF	MAR	Khadija Erremli
—	DF	MAR	Assia El Alami
—	DF	MAR	Hasna El Alami
—	FW	MAR	Jihane Azouz

No.	Pos.	Nation	Player
—	MF	MAR	Rania Kostani
—	DF	MAR	Hassana El Kharraz
—	MF	MAR	Hanane Rahmoni
—	MF	MAR	Nouhaila Jami
—	GK	MAR	Hajar Machnoua
—	GK	MAR	Fatima Zahrae Abzaz
—	DF	MAR	Aya Mouamis
—	DF	MAR	Loubna Benjedim
—	MF	MAR	Hiba Chichaoui
—	MF	MAR	Wassila Bouzakhroum
—	FW	MAR	Aya Ez-Zougani

=== Current staff ===
As of 5 January 2025

Coaching staff
Head coach	(Morocco) Mohamed Derdour
Assistant coach	
