= Sporting Club Casablanca =

Moroccan women's football team

SC Casablanca
- Full name: Sporting Club Casablanca
- Founded: 2019; 6 years ago
- Ground: Ba Mohamed Stadium
- Capacity: 3,000
- Head Coach: (South Africa) Jerry Tshabalala
- League: Moroccan Women's Championship
- 2024–25: D1, 3rd of 14
- Website: sportingclubcasa.com
| Home colours | Away colours | Third colours |

The Sporting Club Casablanca is a Moroccan women's football club competing in the Moroccan Women's Championship. The club is based in the city of Casablanca and plays its matches at the Ba Mohammed Stadium in the Sbata neighborhood.

== History ==
Founded in 2019, Sporting Casablanca is an exceptional women's club that has swiftly risen through the ranks. The first president of the club was Moad Oukacha. Within just two years, the club achieved promotion to the first division and showcased their immense talent by securing a commendable third-place finish in their inaugural season during 2021–22.

Demonstrating their continued progress, the club's remarkable journey reached new heights in 2023 when they reached the Throne Cup final for the very first time. Their path to the final was filled with triumph as they convincingly defeated Fida Association (4–1) in the round of 16, overcame Wydad (4–2) in the quarter-finals, and outperformed Laâyoune Municipal Club (3–0) in the semi-finals. However, despite their valiant efforts, the Casablanca team faced a formidable challenge in the final and succumbed to a 5–0 defeat against AS FAR. In the league, SCC displayed their consistency by finishing as runners-up to AS FAR, achieving an impressive tally of 17 victories in 26 matches.

This remarkable accomplishment was largely attributed to the outstanding performances of their star striker, Chaymaa Mourtaji, who scored 21 goals and secured the second-highest scorer position. Such an achievement has opened new doors for Sporting Casablanca, granting them the opportunity to participate in the prestigious CAF Women's Champions League for the very first time in its 2023 edition. On 14 November 2023, Sporting Casablanca was nominated for the 2023 Best African Club of the Year by CAF.

In the 2023 CAF Women's Champions League, Sporting Casablanca qualified to the knockout stages after finishing second in the group stages winning one match, drawing one and losing one. They won Ampem Darkoa after a penalty-shootout in the semi-final. They ended the tournament as runner-ups after losing 3–0 to Mamelodi Sundowns in the final.

== Players ==
=== Current squad ===
As of 24 August 2023

Note: Flags indicate national team as defined under FIFA eligibility rules; some limited exceptions apply. Players may hold more than one non-FIFA nationality.

| No. | Pos. | Nation | Player |
|---|---|---|---|
| 1 | GK | (Morocco) MAR | Chaimae Chaouni |
| 2 | DF | (Morocco) MAR | Soukaina Hassafi |
| 3 | DF | (Morocco) MAR | Laila Dahrouch |
| 4 | DF | (Morocco) MAR | Abir Choab |
| 5 | DF | (Morocco) MAR | Noura Boukar |
| 6 | FW | (Morocco) MAR | Samya Miftah |
| 7 | MF | (Morocco) MAR | Hajar Bouziani |
| 8 | DF | (Mali) MLI | Aicha Samake |
| 9 | FW | (Morocco) MAR | Chaymaa Mourtaji |
| 10 | MF | (Ivory Coast) CIV | Nadège Koffi |
| — | MF | (Morocco) MAR | Salma Lahyani |

| No. | Pos. | Nation | Player |
|---|---|---|---|
| 12 | GK | (Morocco) MAR | Fatima Ezzahra Bambara |
| 13 | DF | (Morocco) MAR | Sara Abdelhakim |
| 14 | MF | (Morocco) MAR | Salma Miftah |
| 15 | MF | (Morocco) MAR | Meryem Hajri |
| 16 | FW | (Morocco) MAR | Salma Tammar |
| 17 | DF | (Morocco) MAR | Hajar Balkassmi |
| 18 | FW | (Ivory Coast) CIV | Adjoa Sylviane Kokora |
| 20 | DF | (Morocco) MAR | Chaimaa Kriem |
| 22 | GK | (Morocco) MAR | Imane Abdelahad |
| 25 | DF | (Morocco) MAR | Wissal El Assaoui |
| 26 | MF | (Morocco) MAR | Chaimaa Idrissi Acherki |

== Honours ==
=== Domestic ===
League titles

- Moroccan Women's Championship

Runner-up (2): 2023, 2024

- Moroccan Women Throne Cup

Runner-up (1): 2021

- Moroccan Women's Championship D2

Winners (1): 2021

=== Continental ===
- CAF Women's Champions League

Runner-up (1): 2023

- UNAF Women's Champions League

Winners (1): 2023

== Performance in CAF competitions ==
- CAF Women's Champions League: 1 appearances

2023 - Runner-up

== See also ==
- Moroccan Women's Championship
- Moroccan Women Throne Cup
- CAF Women's Champions League
