= Moroccan Women's Throne Cup =

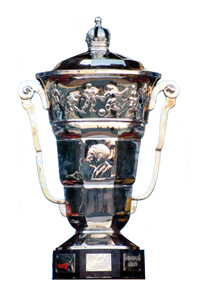
- Founded: 2008
- Region: Morocco
- Current champions: AS FAR (13th title)
- Most championships: AS FAR (13 titles)
- 2026–27

The Moroccan Women's Throne Cup (Arabic: كأس العرش المغربية للسيدات; French: Coupe du Trône féminine marocaine) is a women's association football competition in Morocco. pitting regional teams against each other. It was established in 2008. It is the women's equivalent of the Moroccan Throne Cup for men. The winner of the 2025 edition is AS FAR.

== Finals ==
The list of winners and runners-up:

Ed.	Season	Winners	Score	Runners-up	Venue
1	2008	FC Berrechid	3–0	CA Khénifra	Moulay Abdallah Complex, Rabat
2	2009–10	Raja CA	6–1	RS Tan-Tan	Stade Al Barid, Rabat
3	2010–11	CA Khénifra	3–0	AM Laâyoune	Moulay Hassan Stadium, Rabat
4	2011–12	CA Khénifra	0–0 (6–5 p)	AM Laâyoune	Témara Municipal Stadium, Témara
5	2012–13	AS FAR	8–0	Wydad AC	Moulay Hassan Stadium, Rabat
6	2013–14	AS FAR	2–1	CA Khénifra	FUS Stadium, Rabat
7	2014–15	AS FAR	4–0	AM Laâyoune	Saniat Rmel Stadium, Tétouan
8	2015–16	AS FAR	5–2	AM Laâyoune	Moulay Rachid Stadium, Laayoune, Western Sahara
9	2016–17	AS FAR	7–0	OC Safi	Boubker Ammar Stadium, Salé
10	2017–18	AS FAR	11–0	CS Atlas 05 Fkih Ben Salah	Moulay Hassan Stadium, Rabat
11	2018–19	AS FAR	4–0	CA Khénifra	Oujda Municipal Stadium, Oujda
12	2019–20 (Note: Although officially the 2019–20 season Throne Cup, the tournament began in 2019 but was interrupted by the COVID-19 pandemic in 2020. The competition resumed and concluded during the 2021–22 season.)	AS FAR	1–0	Raja Ait Iazza	Dakhla Municipal Stadium, Dakhla, Western Sahara
13	2020–21 (Note: After the disruption of the 2019–20 edition, all subsequent Throne Cup tournaments were delayed. The 2020–21 edition was held in April 2023, followed by the 2021–22 edition in October of the same year. The 2022–23 edition took place in June 2024, while the 2023–24 edition was held in May 2025.)	AS FAR	5–0	SC Casablanca	Moulay Hassan Stadium, Rabat
14	2021–22	AS FAR	8–0	USS Berkane	Père Jégo Stadium, Casablanca
15	2022–23	AS FAR	4–2	AM Laâyoune	Stade Adrar, Agadir
16	2023–24	AS FAR	3–1	Wydad AC	Sidi Youssef Ben Ali Stadium, Marrakesh
17	2024–25	AS FAR	4–0	RS Berkane	Fez Stadium, Fez

== Most successful clubs ==
Club	Winners	Runners-up	Winning Cups	Runners-up
AS FAR	13	0	2013, 2014, 2015, 2016, 2017, 2018, 2019, 2020, 2021, 2022, 2023, 2024, 2025	
CA Khénifra	2	3	2011, 2012	2009, 2014, 2019
FC Berrechid	1	0	2009	
Raja CA	1	0	2010	
CM Laâyoune	0	5		2011, 2012, 2015, 2016, 2023
Wydad AC	0	2		2013, 2024
RS Tan-Tan	0	1		2010
OC Safi	0	1		2017
Atlas 05 Fkih Ben Salah	0	1		2018
Raja Ait Iazza	0	1		2020
Sporting Casablanca	0	1		2021
USS Berkane	0	1		2022
RS Berkane	0	1		2025

== See also ==
- Moroccan Women's Championship
