= CS Hilal Temara =

Women's football club in Ait Iazza

- Full name: Club Sportif Hilal Temara
- Short name: HST
- Founded: 2014; 12 years ago
- Ground: Stade municipal de Témara, Temara
- Capacity: 5,000
- Coach: Abdelhanin Amkar
- League: Moroccan Women's Championship
- 2024–25: D1, 7th of 14
| Home colours | Away colours | Third colours |

Club Sportif Hilal Temara (Arabic: نادي هلال تمارة الرياضي), shortly known as Hilal Temara or HST, is a professional women's football club based in Temara. which competes in the Moroccan Women's Championship, the top division of Moroccan football.

== History ==
After several attempts and narrow finishes, the club clinched the Second Division Championship in the 2022–23 season, earning promotion to the Elite Division. In their first season at the top level, the team finished 6th and remained in the first division despite a lack of financial support.

== Players and Staff ==
=== Players ===
As of 1 November 2025

Note: Flags indicate national team as defined under FIFA eligibility rules; some limited exceptions apply. Players may hold more than one non-FIFA nationality.

| No. | Pos. | Nation | Player |
|---|---|---|---|
| 1 | GK | MAR | Laila Kaiche |
| 2 | DF | MAR | Fatima Zahraa Naini |
| 3 | DF | CMR | Julie Nke Nke |
| 5 | DF | MAR | Ikram Ouanjli |
| 6 | DF | MAR | Wafae Legdem (C) |
| 7 | MF | MAR | Nisrine Moujahid |
| 8 | MF | MAR | Amal El Aoufi |
| 9 | FW | MAR | Zahra Aribou |
| 10 | FW | MAR | Naima Oujamer |
| 11 | FW | GEQ | Mari Cruz Ebula |

| No. | Pos. | Nation | Player |
|---|---|---|---|
| 12 | GK | MAR | Hasnae Belaiche |
| 13 | DF | MAR | Maissae Hakimi |
| 14 | FW | CMR | Rayna Meyegue |
| 15 | MF | MAR | Saloua Lamsiyeh |
| 17 | FW | MAR | Meryem Berraho |
| 18 | MF | MAR | Inès Aouine |
| 20 | MF | MAR | Khadija Er-Remli |
| 21 | DF | MAR | Khadija El Filali |
| 27 | DF | MAR | Fatima Zahra Serraj |
| 30 | MF | MAR | Hiba Karami |

=== Current staff ===
As of 28 January 2025

Coaching staff
| Head coach | (Morocco) Abdelhanin Amkar |
