= AS FAR (women) =

Association football women's club

- Full name: Association's Sports of Forces Armed Royal women
- Nicknames: Al-Zaeemat (The Bosses); The black devils & Militarians; Black Army
- Short name: ASFAR
- Founded: 2007; 19 years ago
- Ground: Sports Center of FAR
- Manager: Mohamed Amine Alioua
- League: Moroccan Women's Championship
- 2025–26: D1, 1st of 14 (Champions)
| Home colours | Away colours | Third colours |

The Royal Armed Forces Sports Association (French: Association des Sports des Forces Armées Royales AS FAR; Arabic: نادي الجيش الملكي) is a Moroccan professional women's football club based in Morocco's capital Rabat. The club competes in the Moroccan Women's Championship, the top tier of Moroccan football.

AS FAR has won the Moroccan Women's Championship on a record 13 times. The club is affiliated to the men's team of AS FAR who have been playing in the Botola Pro since its inception in 1958–1959.

In domestic football, the club has won 26 trophies; 13 Moroccan Women's Championship titles, 13 Moroccan Women Throne Cup. In continental competitions, AS FAR have won 6 trophies: 3 CAF Women's Champions League and 3 UNAF Women's Champions League titles.

== History ==
The team won the national league in 2021. Afterwards they won the UNAF zonal qualifier which qualified them to the inaugural 2021 CAF Women's Champions League.

In the 2021 CAF Women's Champions League, ASFAR qualified to the knockout stages after finishing second in the group stages winning against Rivers Angels, drawing against Mamelodi Sundowns and losing against Vihiga Queens. They lost 2–1 to Hasaacas Ladies in the semi-final. On 18 November, Asfar clinched the third place by beating Malabo Kings 3–1.

On 11 May 2022, ASFAR won their tenth National Championship title.

In the next edition of the Women's Champions League, ASFAR qualified to the knockout stages after finishing top in the group stages winning all three matches. They defeated Bayelsa Queens in the semi-final, to make their first appearance in the Champions League final. On 13 November 2022, Asfar won their first African cup after defeating Mamelodi Sundowns 4–0 in the 2022 CAF Women's Champions League Final. After winning their continental trophy, King Mohammed VI congratulated them for their heroic performance in becoming the first Moroccan and first North African team to win the Women's champions league. After their asthonishing performance, ASFAR has been named the second-best women's club in Africa for the year 2022 by IFFHS, after receiving a total of 152 points, while first-place holders South Africa's Mamelodi Sundowns Ladies claimed 174 points. On 1 April 2023, Asfar defeated Sporting Casablanca 5–0 to win their 9th throne cup. They went on to win the 2023 league. On 3 October 2023, Asfar defeated USS Berkane 8–0 to win their 10th throne cup. On 14 November 2023, Asfar was nominated for the 2023 Best African Club of the Year by CAF.

== Grounds ==
=== Prince Moulay Abdellah Stadium ===
Prince Moulay Abdellah Stadium (Arabic: مركب الأمير مولاي عبد الله) was a multi-purpose stadium in Rabat, Morocco. It is named after Prince Moulay Abdellah of Morocco. It was built in 1983 and was the home ground of AS FAR until 2023. It was used mostly for football matches and it also staged athletics. The stadium had a capacity of 52,000. From 2008 until 2023, it hosted of the Meeting International Mohammed VI d'Athlétisme de Rabat. It was a confirmed venue for the 2015 Africa Cup of Nations until Morocco was stripped of its hosting rights. It was also a venue for the 2014 FIFA Club World Cup.

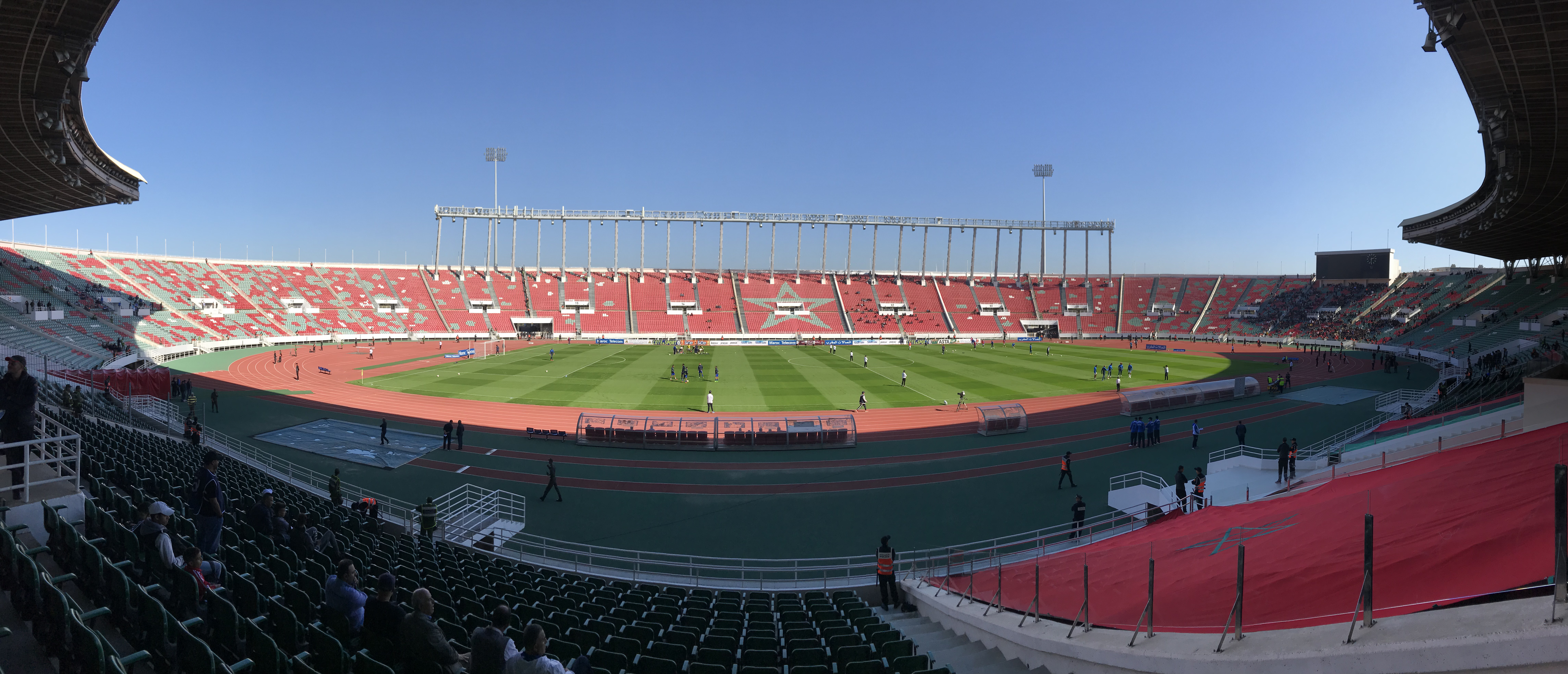

== Performance in CAF competitions ==
- CAF Women's Champions League: 5 appearances

2021 – Third place
2022 – Champion
2023 – Third place
2024 – Runner-up
2025 – Champion
2026 – Champion

== Players ==
As of 17 May 2025

Note: Flags indicate national team as defined under FIFA eligibility rules; some limited exceptions apply. Players may hold more than one non-FIFA nationality.

| No. | Pos. | Nation | Player |
|---|---|---|---|
| 1 | GK | MAR | Khadija Er-Rmichi |
| 2 | DF | MAR | Zineb Redouani |
| 3 | MF | MAR | Ikram Benjaddi |
| 4 | DF | MAR | Siham Boukhami |
| 5 | DF | MAR | Nouhaila Benzina |
| 6 | MF | MAR | Fatima Dahmos |
| 8 | MF | MAR | Zineb Erroudany |
| 9 | FW | MAR | Safa Banouk |
| 10 | FW | MAR | Najat Badri |
| 11 | FW | MAR | Fatima Tagnaout |
| 12 | GK | MAR | Ainaya Boutamachet |

| No. | Pos. | Nation | Player |
|---|---|---|---|
| 13 | MF | MAR | Ouahiba Boukhami |
| 14 | DF | MAR | Aziza Rabbah |
| 15 | DF | MAR | Ghizlane Chhiri |
| 16 | GK | MAR | Hind Hasnaoui |
| 17 | FW | NGR | Anuoluwapo Salisu |
| 18 | FW | MAR | Sanaâ Mssoudy |
| 19 | FW | MAR | Chaymaa Mourtaji |
| 20 | FW | MOZ | Ninika |
| 21 | FW | MAR | Ouafaa Bentahri |
| 23 | MF | MAR | Anissa Lahmari |
| 25 | DF | CMR | Julie Nke Nke |
| 27 | FW | MAR | Hajar Said |

== Honours ==
| Type | Competition | Titles | Winning seasons | Runners-up |
|---|---|---|---|---|
| Domestic | Moroccan Women's Championship | 13 | 2013, 2014, 2016, 2017, 2018, 2019, 2020, 2021, 2022, 2023, 2024, 2025, 2026 | 2015 |
| Domestic | Moroccan Women Throne Cup | 13 | 2013, 2014, 2015, 2016, 2017, 2018, 2019, 2020, 2021, 2022, 2023, 2024, 2025 | – |
| Continental | CAF Women's Champions League | 3 | 2022, 2025, 2026 | 2024 |
| Régional | UNAF Women's Champions League | 3 | 2021, 2024, 2025 | – |

- Record

=== Awards ===
- CAF Club of the Year (Women): 2025

== See also ==
- AS FAR (football club)
- Moroccan Women's Championship
