= Moroccan Women's Championship D1 =

Division 1 Féminin; البطولة الوطنية الاحترافية القسم الأول
- First season: 2001
- Country: Morocco
- Confederation: CAF (Africa)
- Number of clubs: 14
- Level on pyramid: 1
- Relegation to: Division 2 Féminine
- Domestic cup: Throne Cup
- International cup: CAF Champions League
- Current champions: AS FAR (13th title) (2025–26)
- Most championships: AS FAR (13 titles)
- Top scorer: Ghizlane Chebbak (188 goals)
- Broadcasters: Arryadia; FIFA+
- Website: https://frmf.ma/d1-feminin
- Current: 2025–26 Moroccan Women's Championship

The Moroccan Women's Championship, officially known as the Women's Professional National Football Championship D1 (; French: Championnat National Professionnel de Football Féminin D1) and commonly known as the Botola Féminine (lit. 'Women's Botola'), is the top-division professional women's football league in Morocco. The competition is overseen by the Royal Moroccan Football Federation (FRMF) and organised by the Women's National Football League (LNFF).

ASFAR are the current champions of Morocco, having claimed their 13th title in the 2025–26 season.

== History ==
The 2001–02 season marked the launch of the inaugural national women's football championship. The Royal Moroccan Football Federation, through its Women's Football Committee (French: Ligue Nationale de Football Féminin) established two years prior, introduced regional leagues encompassing all clubs and associations within their respective divisions. The league champions faced off in June 2002, concluding with a final in which Mokhtar Soussi Casablanca secured a 2–1 win to claim the championship's inaugural title.

From its inception in 2001 until 2007, the league was structured as an inter-league competition. Each regional league held its own championship, with the winners advancing to compete in the final phases. Starting in the 2007–08 season, the championship was organized for the first time into two groups, North and South.

From the 2019–2020 season onwards, the National Championship Division 1 was restructured, transitioning to a single-group league with 14 teams. Starting in 2021, the league transitioned to a professional status.

In 2024, it was announced that the league would be reduced to 12 teams starting from the 2025–26 season.

== Teams ==
=== Current teams ===
14 teams are competing in the 2024–25 season, representing seven of Morocco's 12 regions. Eight of these teams are affiliated with men's professional clubs, while the remaining six are independent.

Overview of Division 1 Féminin teams
Team	Acronym	Location	Stadium	Capacity	Head coach
AMFF Laâyoune	AMLFF	Laayoune, Laâyoune-Sakia El Hamra	Moulay Rachid Stadium	5,000	(Morocco) Driss Kamiss
AS FAR	ASFAR	Rabat, Rabat-Salé-Kénitra	Complexe sportif Al Mamoun	4,000	(Morocco) Mohamed Amine Alioua
CS Hilal Temara	HST	Temara, Rabat-Salé-Kénitra	Stade Municipal de Témara	5,000	(Morocco) Abdelhanin Amkar
CSS Temara	CSST	Temara, Rabat-Salé-Kénitra	Stade Municipal de Témara	5,000	(Morocco) Mustapha Sedki
Fath US	FUS	Rabat, Rabat-Salé-Kénitra	FUS Training Centre 5	1,000	(Morocco) Mehdi El Qaichouri
Itihad Tanger FF	ITFF	Tanger, Tangier-Tetouan-Al Hoceima	Stade Ziaten 2	2,000	(Morocco) Azedine El Khattaf
Phoenix Marrakech	PFAM	Marrekech, Marrakech-Safi	Terrain Hay Mohammadi	1,500	(Morocco) Adil M'Ghafri
Raja Aïn Harrouda	CRAH	Aïn Harrouda, Casablanca-Settat	Dakhla Aïn Harrouda Sports Complex	1,000	(Morocco) Hamid Qotbi
Raja Ait Iazza FF	ARAFF	Ait Iaaza, Souss-Massa	Stade Communal Ait Iaaza	1,500	(Morocco) Kamal Taouile
RCA Zemamra	RCAZ	Zemamra, Casablanca-Settat	Stade Ahmed choukri	2,500	(Morocco) Mourad Lahjouji
RS Berkane	RSB	Berkane, Oriental	RS Berkane Academy	1,000	(France) Christophe Capian
SC Casablanca	SCC	Casablanca, Casablanca-Settat	Complexe Sportif Ba M'hammed	3,000	(Morocco) Mehdi Bouabidi
SCC Mohammédia	SCCM	Mohammédia, Casablanca-Settat	Stade El Alia	1,000	(Morocco) Mohamed Derdour
Wydad AC	WAC	Casablanca, Casablanca-Settat	Complexe Mohamed-Benjelloun	3,000	(Morocco) Aziz El Hassouni

== Champions ==
The list of champions and runners-up:
List of Champions on RSSSF

Year	Champions	Runners-up
2001–02	MSC	CAK
2002–03	ANSA	CAK
2003–04	Cancelled	
2004–05	FCB (1)	CAK
2005–06	FCB (2)	CRAH
2006–07	WAC (1)	FCB
2007–08	FCB (3)	CAK
2008–09	CRAH (1)	RCA
2009–10	AMLFF (1)	FCB

Year	Champions	Runners-up
2010–11	AMLFF (2)	CAK
2011–12	AMLFF (3)	CAK
2012–13	ASFAR (1)	WAC
2013–14	ASFAR (2)	CAK
2014–15	AMLFF (4)	ASFAR
2015–16	ASFAR (3)	AMLFF
2016–17	ASFAR (4)	AMLFF
2017–18	ASFAR (5)	AMLFF

Year	Champions	Runners-up
2018–19	ASFAR (6)	WAC
2019–20	ASFAR (7)	AMLFF
2020–21	ASFAR (8)	ARAFF
2021–22	ASFAR (9)	AMLFF
2022–23	ASFAR (10)	SCC
2023–24	ASFAR (11)	SCC
2024–25	ASFAR (12)	RSB
2025–26	ASFAR (13)	FUS

== Most successful clubs ==
Rank	Club	Champions	Runners-up	Winning seasons	Runners-up seasons
1	AS FAR	13	1	2013, 2014, 2016, 2017, 2018, 2019, 2020, 2021, 2022, 2023, 2024, 2025, 2026	2015
2	CM Laâyoune	4	5	2010, 2011, 2012, 2015	2016, 2017, 2018, 2020, 2022
3	FC Berrechid	3	2	2005, 2006, 2008	2007, 2010
4	Wydad AC	1	2	2007	2013, 2019
5	Raja Aïn Harrouda	1	1	2009	2006
6	MS Casablanca	1	0	2002	
6	Najah Souss	1	0	2003	
7	CA Khénifra	0	7		2002, 2003, 2005, 2008, 2011, 2012, 2014
9	SC Casablanca	0	2		2023, 2024
10	Raja CA	0	1		2009
10	Raja Ait Iazza	0	1		2021
10	Fath Union Sport	0	1		2026

=== By city ===
City	Championships	Clubs
Rabat	13	AS FAR (13)
Laayoune	4	CM Laâyoune (4)
Berrechid	3	FC Berrechid (3)
Casablanca	2	Wydad (1), MS Casablanca (1)
Aïn Harrouda	1	Raja Aïn Harrouda (1)
Agadir	1	Najah Souss (1)

== Top goalscorers ==
Season	Player	Team	Goals
2013-14	(Morocco) Ghizlane Chebbak	AS FAR	54
2014-15	(Morocco) Ghizlane Chebbak	AS FAR	37
2015-16	(Morocco) Ghizlane Chebbak	AS FAR	39
2015-16	(Morocco) Ibtissam Jraidi	AS FAR	39
2016-17	(Morocco) Ghizlane Chebbak	AS FAR	35
2017-18	(Morocco) Ibtissam Jraidi	AS FAR	-
2019-20	(Morocco) Ibtissam Jraidi	AS FAR	35
2020-21	(Morocco) Ibtissam Jraidi	AS FAR	36
2021-22	(Morocco) Ibtissam Jraidi	AS FAR	31
2022-23	(Morocco) Ghizlane Chebbak	AS FAR	23
2023–24	(Mali) Agueissa Diarra	SC Casablanca	29
2024–25	(Kenya) Violet Wanyonyi	AM Laâyoune	28
2025–26	(Morocco) Nadia Laftah	Wydad AC	26

Most times goalscorer

- 5 times.
  - (Morocco) Ghizlane Chebbak
  - (Morocco) Ibtissam Jraidi

Most goals by a player in a single season

- 54 goals.
  - (Morocco) Ghizlane Chebbak

== See also ==
- Moroccan Women Throne Cup
