= Ait Iaaza =

Coordinates: 30.50626°N 8.79313°W

- Town
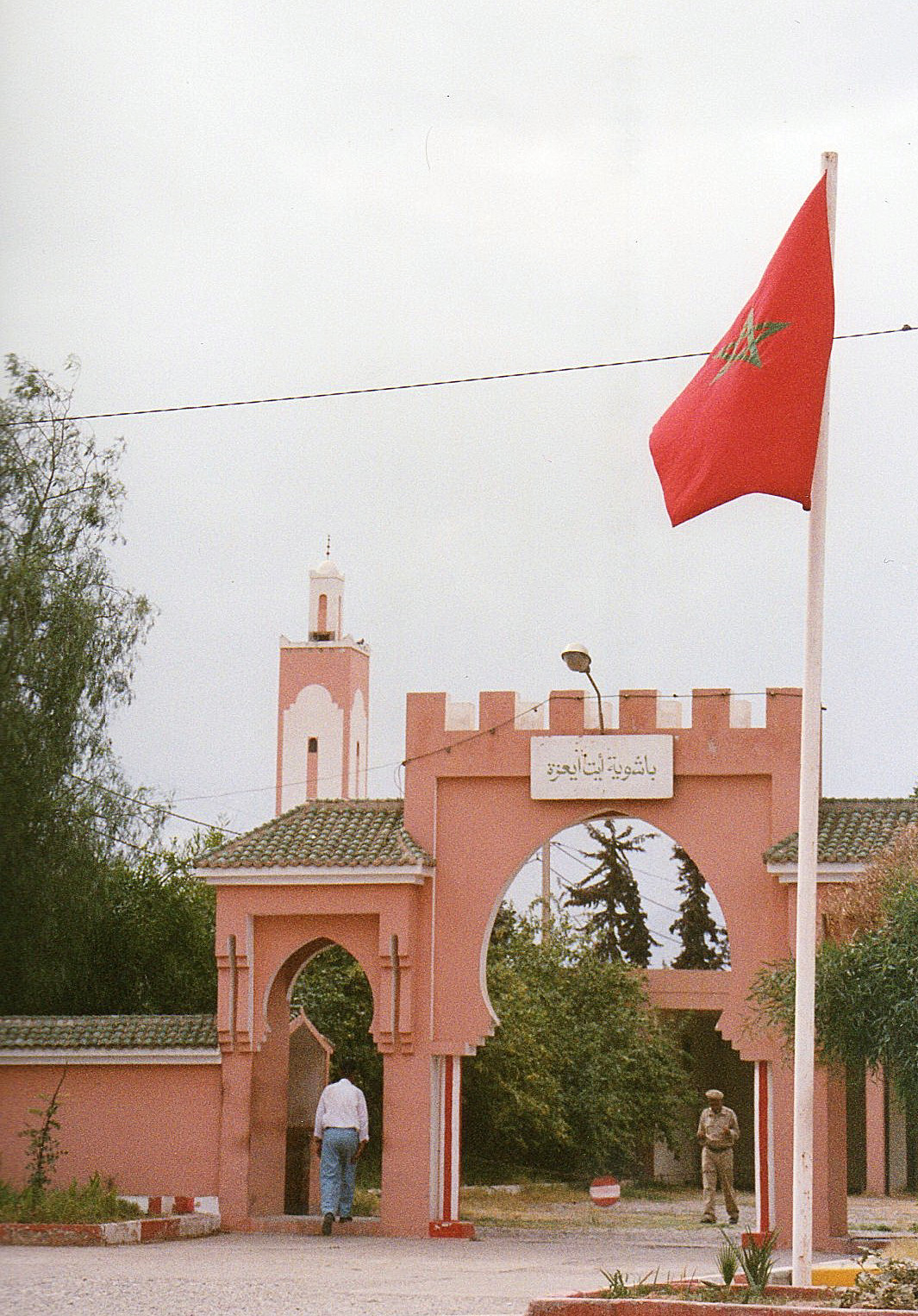
- Interactive map of Ait Iaaza
- Country: Morocco
- Region: Souss-Massa
- Province: Taroudant Province

Population (2004)
  - Total: 9,984
- Time zone: UTC+0 (GMT)

Ait Iaaza is a town in Taroudant Province, Souss-Massa, Morocco. According to the 2004 census it has a population of 9,984.
