= 2025 FIFA Futsal Women's World Cup squads =

The 2025 FIFA Futsal Women's World Cup was the inaugural edition of the international women's futsal tournament held in the Philippines from November 21 to December 7, 2025. The 16 participating national teams were required by FIFA to register a squad of 14 players, including at least two goalkeepers.

The rosters were confirmed on November 14, 2025 by FIFA. Teams which announced their roster prior to the confirmation by FIFA is also noted here.

This article lists the national futsal squads that participated in the tournament. The age listed for each player is as of November 21, 2025, the first day of the tournament. The club listed is the club indicated in the official squad list. A flag is included for coaches who are of a different nationality to their team.

== Group A ==
=== Philippines ===
Head coach: (Spain) Rafael Merino Rodríguez

The final squad of the Philippines was announced on November 14, 2025. (Note: As confirmed by FIFA's publication of the final squad on November 14, 2025.)

No.	Pos.	Player	Date of birth (age)	Club
1	GK	Samantha Hughes	May 21, 2008 (aged 17)	(Football Australia) Sala Time
2	MF	Lanie Ortillo	April 8, 2005 (aged 20)	(Philippine Football Federation) Tuloy
3	DF	Cathrine Graversen	April 25, 1998 (aged 27)	(Danish Football Association) B93
4	GK	Kayla Santiago	August 24, 2001 (aged 24)	(Philippine Football Federation) UA&P
5	FW	Dionesa Tolentin	June 25, 2000 (aged 25)	(Philippine Football Federation) Kaya–Iloilo
6	DF	Jaclyn Sawicki	November 14, 1992 (aged 33)	(Canadian Soccer Association) Calgary Wild
7	FW	Katrina Guillou	December 19, 1993 (aged 31)	(United States Soccer Federation) DC Power
8	MF	Regine Rebosora	September 21, 2001 (aged 24)	(Philippine Football Federation) FEU
9	FW	Alisha del Campo	September 20, 1999 (aged 26)	(Philippine Football Federation) Kaya–Iloilo
10	DF	Judy Connolly	July 26, 2003 (aged 22)	(Football Australia) Cockburn Wolves
11	MF	Isabella Bandoja	March 30, 2001 (aged 24)	(Philippine Football Federation) Tuloy
12	DF	Charisa Lemoran	September 21, 1998 (aged 27)	(Philippine Football Federation) Stallion Laguna
13	MF	Rocelle Mendaño	May 19, 2000 (aged 25)	(Philippine Football Federation) Kaya–Iloilo
14	FW	Isabella Flanigan	February 22, 2005 (aged 20)	(Football Australia) Cockburn Wolves

=== Poland ===
Head coach: Wojciech Weiss

The final squad of Poland was announced on November 14, 2025.

No.	Pos.	Player	Date of birth (age)	Club
1	GK	Andżelika Dąbek	June 22, 1992 (aged 33)	(Polish Football Association) LUKS Rolnik
2	FW	Paula Fronczak	April 22, 1992 (aged 33)	(Polish Football Association) KU AZS UAM Poznań
3	MF	Anna Chóras	July 3, 2001 (aged 24)	(Polish Football Association) BTS Rekord
4	FW	Klaudia Dymińska	November 13, 1996 (aged 29)	(Polish Football Association) KU AZS UAM Poznań
5	DF	Izabela Tracz	October 2, 1998 (aged 27)	(Polish Football Association) BTS Rekord
6	DF	Zuzanna Maronde	February 23, 2003 (aged 22)	(Polish Football Association) KS Uniwersytet Jagielloński
7	MF	Agata Bała	February 6, 1998 (aged 27)	(Polish Football Association) Nowy Świt Górzno
8	MF	Julia Szostak	January 22, 2000 (aged 25)	(Italian Football Federation) Soccer Altamura
9	MF	Julia Basta	October 16, 2001 (aged 24)	(Polish Football Association) Nowy Świt Górzno
10	DF	Klaudia Kubaszek	May 29, 1998 (aged 27)	(Italian Football Federation) Soccer Altamura
11	DF	Wiktoria Pietrzyk	December 13, 2000 (aged 24)	(Polish Football Association) KS Uniwersytet Jagielloński
12	GK	Natalia Majewska	September 24, 2004 (aged 21)	(Polish Football Association) BTS Rekord
13	MF	Katarzyna Włodarczyk	April 27, 1999 (aged 26)	(Polish Football Association) Słomniczanka Słomniki
14	FW	Natalia Matuszewska	September 21, 2005 (aged 20)	(Polish Football Association) Nowy Świt Górzno

=== Morocco ===
Head coach: Adil Sayeh

The final squad of Morocco was announced on November 14, 2025.

No.	Pos.	Player	Date of birth (age)	Club
1	GK	Kawtar Bentaleb	February 13, 1999 (aged 26)	(Royal Moroccan Football Federation) RS Berkane
2	FP	Hajar Tahri	August 8, 2001 (aged 24)	(Royal Moroccan Football Federation) Wydad AC
3	FW	Chaimae Drissi	October 3, 1999 (aged 26)	(Royal Moroccan Football Federation) RS Berkane
4	FP	Soumia Hady	June 30, 1998 (aged 27)	(Royal Moroccan Football Federation) RS Berkane
5	FP	Jasmine Demraoui	January 21, 2004 (aged 21)	(French Football Federation) Besançon Académie
6	FW	Manal Essafir	February 27, 2004 (aged 21)	(Royal Spanish Football Federation) Las Norias
7	FP	Siiham Tadlaoui	January 26, 1989 (aged 36)	(Royal Moroccan Football Federation) Jawharat Larache
8	FW	Meryem Hajri	September 14, 1994 (aged 31)	(Royal Moroccan Football Federation) SC Casablanca
9	FP	Nadia Laftah	January 14, 1997 (aged 28)	(Royal Moroccan Football Federation) Wydad AC
10	FP	Drissia Korrych	January 30, 1993 (aged 32)	(Royal Moroccan Football Federation) FUS Rabat
11	FP	Malak Zaid Alkilani	March 3, 2004 (aged 21)	(Royal Moroccan Football Federation) SC Casablanca
12	GK	Chaimaa Aasem	October 30, 1997 (aged 28)	(Royal Moroccan Football Federation) US Touarga
13	FW	Chaymaa Mourtaji	December 8, 1995 (aged 29)	(Royal Moroccan Football Federation) SC Casablanca
14	FP	Amal El Aoufi	September 1, 1999 (aged 26)	(Royal Moroccan Football Federation) CS Hilal Temara

=== Argentina ===
Head coach: Nicolas Noriega

The final squad of Argentina was announced on November 14, 2025.

No.	Pos.	Player	Date of birth (age)	Club
1	GK	Trinidad D'Andrea	9 November 1994 (aged 31)	(Argentine Football Association) Secla Futsal
2	MF	Maca Espinoza	February 12, 2003 (aged 22)	(Argentine Football Association) Ferro Carril Oeste
3	MF	Lucía Rossi	May 22, 2005 (aged 20)	(Argentine Football Association) Ferro Carril Oeste
4	DF	Lara Villalba	June 24, 2002 (aged 23)	(Argentine Football Association) Ferro Carril Oeste
5	MF	Julia Dupuy	February 9, 2000 (aged 25)	(Royal Spanish Football Federation) AE Penya Esplugues
6	FP	Melina Quevedo	July 24, 1994 (aged 31)	(Argentine Football Association) Racing Club
7	MF	Luciana Natta	March 8, 2003 (aged 22)	(Argentine Football Association) All Boys
8	FP	Carina Núñez	June 11, 1991 (aged 34)	(Royal Spanish Football Federation) Atlético Torcal
9	FP	Ana Ontiveros	May 1, 1990 (aged 35)	(Royal Spanish Football Federation) Estrela Cortegada
10	FP	Silvina Nava	February 13, 2002 (aged 23)	(Royal Spanish Football Federation) Torreblanca Melilla
11	MF	Agostina Chiesa	January 28, 1989 (aged 36)	(Argentine Football Association) Racing Club
12	GK	Silvina Espinazo	June 5, 1986 (aged 39)	(Argentine Football Association) Racing Club
13	FW	Mailén Romero	November 19, 1997 (aged 28)	(Royal Spanish Football Federation) AD Ceuta
14	FP	Melany Orellana	August 31, 2000 (aged 25)	(Argentine Football Association) Secla Futsal

== Group B ==
=== Spain ===
Head coach: Claudia Pons

The final squad of Spain was announced on November 14, 2025.

No.	Pos.	Player	Date of birth (age)	Club
1	GK	Elena González	January 1, 1999 (aged 26)	(Royal Spanish Football Federation) Poio Pescamar FS
2	DF	Noelia Montoro	November 1, 1997 (aged 28)	(Royal Spanish Football Federation) Poio Pescamar FS
3	FP	Daniela Domingos	July 13, 1984 (aged 41)	(Royal Spanish Football Federation) LBTL Alcantarilla
4	DF	Laura Córdoba	June 19, 2003 (aged 22)	(Royal Spanish Football Federation) Atlético Navalcarnero
5	DF	Cecilia Zarzuela	November 14, 2002 (aged 23)	(Royal Spanish Football Federation) Roldán FS
6	FP	María Sanz Navarro	December 18, 1997 (aged 27)	(Royal Spanish Football Federation) Atlético Navalcarnero
7	FP	Ale de Paz	May 25, 1995 (aged 30)	(Royal Spanish Football Federation) Poio Pescamar FS
8	FP	Laura Sánchez	November 4, 2001 (aged 24)	(Royal Spanish Football Federation) AD Alcorcón FSF
9	FP	Vane Sotelo	August 21, 1995 (aged 30)	(Royal Spanish Football Federation) AD Alcorcón FSF
10	DF	Antía Pérez	June 21, 2000 (aged 25)	(Royal Spanish Football Federation) FSF O Castro
11	FP	Irene Samper	April 24, 1998 (aged 27)	(Royal Spanish Football Federation) Torreblanca Melilla
12	GK	Cristina García	January 22, 1995 (aged 30)	(Royal Spanish Football Federation) Roldán FS
13	FP	Marta López Pardo	March 19, 2001 (aged 24)	(Royal Spanish Football Federation) Poio Pescamar FS
14	FP	Irene Córdoba	June 19, 2003 (aged 22)	(Royal Spanish Football Federation) Atlético Navalcarnero

=== Thailand ===
Head coach: Thanatorn Santanaprasit

The final squad of Thailand was announced on November 14, 2025.

No.	Pos.	Player	Date of birth (age)	Club
1	GK	Sasiprapha Suksen	February 22, 1991 (aged 34)	(Football Association of Thailand) Bangkok Women's
2	GK	Nuengruthai Sorahong	August 7, 2001 (aged 24)	(Football Association of Thailand) Port Imane SWU Samchuk
3	DF	Jenjira Bubpha	February 14, 1996 (aged 29)	(Football Association of Thailand) Bangkok Women's
4	DF	Patitta Moolpho	February 21, 1995 (aged 30)	(Football Association of Thailand) BGC Bundit Asia
5	DF	Hataichanok Tappakun	June 2, 1988 (aged 37)	(Football Association of Thailand) Bangkok Women's
6	MF	Sangrawee Meekham	February 27, 1997 (aged 28)	(Football Association of Thailand) BGC Bundit Asia
7	MF	Sasikarn Tongdee	October 17, 1999 (aged 26)	(Football Association of Thailand) Kasem Bundit
8	FW	Paerploy Huajaipetch	October 13, 2002 (aged 23)	(Football Association of Thailand) Suan Sunandha Inspire T-Sport
9	FW	Arriya Saetoen	March 19, 2006 (aged 19)	(Football Association of Thailand) Port Imane SWU Samchuk
10	MF	Lalida Chimpabut	December 20, 2004 (aged 20)	(Football Association of Thailand) Suan Sunandha Inspire T-Sport
11	MF	Nattamon Artkla	November 27, 1996 (aged 28)	(Football Association of Thailand) ACSAT Ratchaburi
12	MF	Saovapha Tranga	February 5, 2000 (aged 25)	(Football Association of Thailand) ACSAT Ratchaburi
13	FW	Darika Peanpailun	July 15, 1992 (aged 33)	(Football Association of Thailand) Bangkok Women's
14	DF	Panwasa Kingthong	October 7, 2001 (aged 24)	(Football Association of Thailand) Kasem Bundit

=== Colombia ===
Head coach: Roberto Bruno

The final squad of Colombia was announced on November 14, 2025.

No.	Pos.	Player	Date of birth (age)	Club
1	GK	Paula Valencia	May 31, 1994 (aged 31)	(Colombian Football Federation) Tolima John Jota Sport
2	FP	Karen Torres	April 7, 2004 (aged 21)	(Ecuadorian Football Federation) La Unión
3	FP	Elizabeth Guerra	March 30, 1999 (aged 26)	(Royal Spanish Football Federation) CD Salesianos Puertollano
4	FP	Isabella Mosquera	December 1, 2005 (aged 19)	(Colombian Football Federation) CD Politécnico
5	DF	Danna Rodríguez	March 4, 2003 (aged 22)	(Colombian Football Federation) Civil United
6	FP	Alejandra Apraez	June 7, 1999 (aged 26)	(Uruguayan Football Association) Club Nacional
7	DF	Merlin Salcedo	February 13, 2003 (aged 22)	(Colombian Football Federation) Civil United
8	FP	Angely Camargo	March 13, 2001 (aged 24)	(Argentine Football Association) San Lorenzo
9	FP	Nicole Mancilla	June 15, 2004 (aged 21)	(Colombian Football Federation) Independiente Cali
10	DF	Melissa Jaimes	September 14, 2003 (aged 22)	(Royal Spanish Football Federation) Atlético Torcal
11	FP	Dayana Rivera	September 9, 2004 (aged 21)	(Colombian Football Federation) Civil United
12	GK	Allison Olave	May 5, 2003 (aged 22)	(Colombian Football Federation) Civil United
13	DF	Laura Bustos	April 13, 2001 (aged 24)	(Colombian Football Federation) Civil United
14	FP	Diana Celis	February 13, 1993 (aged 32)	(Colombian Football Federation) Llaneros

=== Canada ===
Head coach: Alexandre Da Rocha

Canada announced their final squad on November 7, 2025.

No.	Pos.	Player	Date of birth (age)	Club
1	GK	Léa Palacio-Tellier	December 27, 1996 (aged 28)	(Canadian Soccer Association) Grenadières
2	FP	Erika Pion	April 28, 1992 (aged 33)	(Canadian Soccer Association) Atlético Montréal
3	FP	Jade Houmphanh	December 14, 2001 (aged 23)	(Canadian Soccer Association) SK Impact
4	DF	Sophie Therien	April 4, 1993 (aged 32)	(Canadian Soccer Association) Montreal Xtreme ADR
5	DF	Maude Lagacé	March 31, 2001 (aged 24)	(Canadian Soccer Association) Montreal Xtreme ADR
6	FP	Shayla He	October 9, 2003 (aged 22)	(Canadian Soccer Association) Underdogs
7	FP	Joelle Gosselin	April 23, 1994 (aged 31)	(Canadian Soccer Association) Montreal Xtreme ADR
8	FP	Cynthia Gaspar Freire	April 20, 1995 (aged 30)	(Canadian Soccer Association) Montreal Xtreme ADR
9	FP	Esther Brossard	May 19, 2006 (aged 19)	(United States Soccer Federation) Lehigh University
10	FP	Stephie-Ann Dadaillé	November 6, 1994 (aged 31)	(Canadian Soccer Association) Atlético Montréal
11	FP	Erica Hindmarsh	September 21, 1994 (aged 31)	(Canadian Soccer Association) SK Impact
12	FP	Magali Gagné	July 26, 2003 (aged 22)	(United States Soccer Federation) Pittsburgh Panthers
13	DF	Katerine Delev	August 7, 2000 (aged 25)	(Canadian Soccer Association) Gotham
14	GK	Jadyn Steinhauer	November 23, 1998 (aged 26)	(Canadian Soccer Association) SK Impact

== Group C ==
=== Portugal ===
Head coach: Luís Conceição

The final squad of Portugal was announced on November 14, 2025.

No.	Pos.	Player	Date of birth (age)	Club
1	GK	Ana Catarina	November 19, 1992 (aged 33)	(Portuguese Football Federation) Benfica
2	FP	Inês Matos	October 26, 1999 (aged 26)	(Portuguese Football Federation) Benfica
3	FP	Helena Nunes	February 8, 2002 (aged 23)	(Royal Spanish Football Federation) Atlético Navalcarnero
4	FP	Kaka	November 6, 1995 (aged 30)	(Portuguese Football Federation) Nun'Álvares
5	FP	Débora Lavrador	January 16, 1996 (aged 29)	(Royal Spanish Football Federation) Poio Pescamar FS
6	FP	Kika	February 9, 2000 (aged 25)	(Portuguese Football Federation) Leões de Porto Salvo
7	FP	Ana Azevedo	July 28, 1986 (aged 39)	(Portuguese Football Federation) Nun'Álvares
8	FP	Janice Silva	June 12, 1997 (aged 28)	(Portuguese Football Federation) Benfica
9	FP	Fifó	August 9, 2000 (aged 25)	(Portuguese Football Federation) Benfica
10	FP	Maria Pereira	December 16, 1995 (aged 29)	(Portuguese Football Federation) Benfica
11	FP	Carolina Pedreira	April 14, 2002 (aged 23)	(Royal Spanish Football Federation) Poio Pescamar FS
12	GK	Maria Rocha	June 14, 1996 (aged 29)	(Portuguese Football Federation) Nun'Álvares
13	FP	Marta Teixeira	February 14, 2001 (aged 24)	(Portuguese Football Federation) Nun'Álvares
14	FP	Lídia Moreira	March 28, 1995 (aged 30)	(Portuguese Football Federation) Nun'Álvares

=== Tanzania ===
Head coach: (Jamaica) Curtis Red

The final squad of Tanzania was announced on November 14, 2025.

No.	Pos.	Player	Date of birth (age)	Club
1	GK	Zuhura Waziri	November 7, 2001 (aged 24)	(Tanzania Football Federation) Simba Queens
2	FP	Nasma Manduta	August 29, 2007 (aged 18)	(Tanzania Football Federation) Ceasiaa Queens
3	FP	Edina Makamba	December 5, 2008 (aged 16)	(Tanzania Football Federation) Tausi
4	FP	Winfrida Charles	October 20, 2008 (aged 17)	(Tanzania Football Federation) Fountain Gate
5	DF	Fatuma Issa	April 6, 1995 (aged 30)	(Tanzania Football Federation) Simba Queens
6	FP	Sabina Mbuga	November 22, 1997 (aged 27)	(Tanzania Football Federation) Mashujaa Queens
7	FP	Zainabu Karuka	July 8, 2009 (aged 16)	(Tanzania Football Federation) Fountain Gate
8	FP	Yasinta Kaluwa	May 17, 2010 (aged 15)	(Tanzania Football Federation) Yanga Princess
9	FP	Helena Mtundagi	August 4, 2010 (aged 15)	(Tanzania Football Federation) Fountain Gate
10	FP	Mary Siyame	October 25, 2008 (aged 17)	(Tanzania Football Federation) Fountain Gate
11	FP	Rehema Buteme	December 15, 2007 (aged 17)	(Tanzania Football Federation) Tausi
12	GK	Gelwa Lugomba	December 30, 1998 (aged 26)	(Tanzania Football Federation) Mashujaa Queens
13	FP	Zawadi Athuman	February 20, 2006 (aged 19)	(Tanzania Football Federation) Simba Queens
14	FW	Shelda Mafuru	March 28, 1997 (aged 28)	(Tanzania Football Federation) Simba Queens

=== Japan ===
Head coach: Takehiro Suga

Japan announced their final squad on October 30, 2025.

No.	Pos.	Player	Date of birth (age)	Club
1	GK	Nene Inoue	June 28, 1995 (aged 30)	(Japan Football Association) Tachikawa Athletic
2	GK	Yuria Suto	January 31, 2001 (aged 24)	(Royal Spanish Football Federation) Marín
3	MF	Mika Eguchi	November 25, 1994 (aged 30)	(Japan Football Association) Bardral Urayasu
4	DF	Mizuki Nakamura	August 15, 1995 (aged 30)	(Japan Football Association) Tachikawa Athletic
5	DF	Kaho Ito	November 18, 1994 (aged 31)	(Japan Football Association) Bardral Urayasu
6	MF	Aki Ikeuchi	October 12, 2001 (aged 24)	(Japan Football Association) Bardral Urayasu
7	DF	Sara Oino	December 12, 2000 (aged 24)	(Japan Football Association) SWH Nishinomiya
8	MF	Yukari Miyahara	August 6, 1994 (aged 31)	(Japan Football Association) Bardral Urayasu
9	FW	Ryo Egawa	March 30, 1996 (aged 29)	(Japan Football Association) SWH Nishinomiya
10	MF	Anna Amishiro	July 8, 1991 (aged 34)	(Japan Football Association) SWH Nishinomiya
11	FW	Risa Ikadai	August 12, 1988 (aged 37)	(Japan Football Association) Bardral Urayasu
12	FW	Yuka Iwasaki	June 17, 2002 (aged 23)	(Japan Football Association) Fugador Sumida
13	MF	Kyoka Takahashi	August 26, 1998 (aged 27)	(Japan Football Association) Arco Kobe
14	MF	Naomi Matsumoto	October 22, 1997 (aged 28)	(Japan Football Association) Bardral Urayasu

=== New Zealand ===
Head coach: Nic Downes

New Zealand announced their final squad on November 6, 2025.

No.	Pos.	Player	Date of birth (age)	Club
1	GK	Danielle Bradley	January 20, 1996 (aged 29)	(New Zealand Football) Eastern Suburbs
2	DF	Shivy Anthony	May 8, 1995 (aged 30)	(Japan Football Association) Pescadola Machida
3	FP	Jess Verdon	October 3, 1989 (aged 36)	(New Zealand Football) Papakura City
4	FP	Jamie Evans	December 1, 2004 (aged 20)	(New Zealand Football) Waikato Rapids
5	DF	Sophie Williams	April 18, 1998 (aged 27)	(Football Australia) Melbourne AKU
6	FP	Dayna Manak	June 17, 1996 (aged 29)	(The Football Association) Bloomsbury
7	FP	Hannah Kraakman	March 14, 1996 (aged 29)	(The Football Association) Bloomsbury
8	FP	Jordana Bremner	November 12, 2003 (aged 22)	(New Zealand Football) Papakura City
9	FP	Alosi Bloomfield	May 17, 1999 (aged 26)	(New Zealand Football) Three Kings United
10	FP	Catherine Pretty	April 12, 1994 (aged 31)	(The Football Association) Bloomsbury
11	FP	Britney-Lee Nicholson	January 27, 2000 (aged 25)	(New Zealand Football) Canterbury United Pride
12	GK	Hannah Hegarty	January 28, 1999 (aged 26)	(New Zealand Football) Canterbury United Pride
13	DF	Ella James	February 20, 1999 (aged 26)	(New Zealand Football) Papakura City
14	DF	Ellena Firth	December 7, 2002 (aged 22)	(New Zealand Football) Papakura City

== Group D ==
=== Brazil ===
Head coach: Wilson Saboia

Brazil announced their final squad on September 25, 2025.

No.	Pos.	Player	Date of birth (age)	Club
1	GK	Júlia	September 28, 1988 (aged 37)	(Portuguese Football Federation) Nun'Álvares
2	MF	Débora	September 14, 1995 (aged 30)	(Italian Football Federation) Signor Prestito CMB
3	GK	Bianca	March 23, 1989 (aged 36)	(Brazilian Football Confederation) Stein Cascavel
4	DF	Taty	March 28, 1987 (aged 38)	(Italian Football Federation) Signor Prestito CMB
5	FP	Tampa	January 14, 1991 (aged 34)	(Italian Football Federation) Roma
6	MF	Simone	January 10, 1992 (aged 33)	(Russian Football Union) Kristall St. Petersburg
7	MF	Diana	March 31, 1992 (aged 33)	(Italian Football Federation) USD Bitonto C5
8	DF	Luana	October 21, 1999 (aged 26)	(Brazilian Football Confederation) Stein Cascavel
9	FP	Emilly	September 6, 1994 (aged 31)	(Royal Spanish Football Federation) Torreblanca Melilla
10	FP	Luciléia	June 28, 1983 (aged 42)	(Italian Football Federation) USD Bitonto C5
11	DF	Camila	September 4, 1992 (aged 33)	(Portuguese Football Federation) Nun'Álvares
12	MF	Amandinha	September 5, 1994 (aged 31)	(Royal Spanish Football Federation) Torreblanca Melilla
13	FP	Natalinha	December 25, 1994 (aged 30)	(Brazilian Football Confederation) Taboão Magnus
14	FP	Ana Luiza	July 24, 2000 (aged 25)	(Royal Spanish Football Federation) Torreblanca Melilla

=== Iran ===
Head coach: Shahrzad Mozafar

The final squad of Iran was announced on November 14, 2025.

No.	Pos.	Player	Date of birth (age)	Club
1	GK	Farzaneh Tavassoli	January 19, 1987 (aged 38)	(Football Federation Islamic Republic of Iran) Esteghlal Tehran
2	FP	Shirin Saffar	May 5, 2005 (aged 20)	(Football Federation Islamic Republic of Iran) Palayesh Naft Abadan
3	GK	Zahra Lotfabadi	January 11, 1995 (aged 30)	(Football Federation Islamic Republic of Iran) Palayesh Naft Abadan
4	DF	Fatemeh Rahmati	May 5, 1997 (aged 28)	(Football Federation Islamic Republic of Iran) Foolad Hormozgan
5	FP	Sara Shirbeigi	August 6, 1991 (aged 34)	(Football Federation Islamic Republic of Iran) Palayesh Naft Abadan
6	FP	Fereshteh Khosravi	April 11, 1996 (aged 29)	(Football Federation Islamic Republic of Iran) Foolad Hormozgan
7	FP	Fereshteh Karimi	February 6, 1989 (aged 36)	(Football Federation Islamic Republic of Iran) Foolad Hormozgan
8	FP	Elham Anafjeh	February 14, 1998 (aged 27)	(Football Federation Islamic Republic of Iran) Palayesh Naft Abadan
9	FP	Mahsa Kamali	August 5, 1994 (aged 31)	(Football Federation Islamic Republic of Iran) Sanat Mes Kerman
10	DF	Nasimeh Gholami	July 18, 1985 (aged 40)	(Football Federation Islamic Republic of Iran) Foolad Hormozgan
11	DF	Nastaran Moghimi	July 16, 1990 (aged 35)	(Football Federation Islamic Republic of Iran) Esteghlal Tehran
12	GK	Tahereh Mehdi Pour	August 19, 1996 (aged 29)	(Football Federation Islamic Republic of Iran) Sanat Mes Kerman
13	FP	Mahtab Banaei	March 25, 1997 (aged 28)	(Football Federation Islamic Republic of Iran) Esteghlal Tehran
14	FP	Maral Torkaman	November 26, 2002 (aged 22)	(Football Federation Islamic Republic of Iran) Esteghlal Tehran

=== Italy ===
Head coach: Francesca Salvatore

The final squad of Italy was announced on November 14, 2025.

No.	Pos.	Player	Date of birth (age)	Club
1	GK	Ana Sestari	February 13, 1996 (aged 29)	(Italian Football Federation) Roma A5
2	FW	Rafaela Dal'Maz	January 31, 1991 (aged 34)	(Royal Spanish Football Federation) Poio Pescamar FS
3	DF	Ludovica Coppari	December 11, 1998 (aged 26)	(Italian Football Federation) Kick Off C5
4	DF	Bruna Borges	February 25, 1992 (aged 33)	(Italian Football Federation) Kick Off C5
5	DF	Adrieli Berté	March 16, 1995 (aged 30)	(Italian Football Federation) Roma A5
6	FW	Sara Boutimah	August 20, 1995 (aged 30)	(Italian Football Federation) TikiTaka Planet
7	FW	Alessia Grieco	March 15, 1999 (aged 26)	(Italian Football Federation) Bitonto C5
8	FW	Nicoletta Mansueto	April 24, 1997 (aged 28)	(Italian Football Federation) TikiTaka Planet
9	FW	Renata Adamatti	March 5, 1993 (aged 32)	(Italian Football Federation) CMB Futsal Team
10	MF	Gaby Vanelli	April 3, 2000 (aged 25)	(Italian Football Federation) Roma A5
11	MF	Brenda Bettioli	December 27, 1990 (aged 34)	(Italian Football Federation) TikiTaka Planet
12	GK	Denise Carturan	July 30, 1997 (aged 28)	(Italian Football Federation) Città di Falconara
13	MF	Erika Ferrara	July 16, 1999 (aged 26)	(Italian Football Federation) Città di Falconara
14	MF	Greta Ghilardi	October 6, 2003 (aged 22)	(Italian Football Federation) Bitonto C5

=== Panama ===
Head coach: Amarelis De Mera

The final squad of Panama was announced on November 14, 2025.

No.	Pos.	Player	Date of birth (age)	Club
1	GK	Nadia Ducreux	January 26, 1992 (aged 33)	(Panamanian Football Federation) Chorrillo
2	DF	Maryorie Pérez	November 25, 1997 (aged 27)	(Panamanian Football Federation) UMECIT
3	FP	Maritza Escartín	June 15, 2003 (aged 22)	(Panamanian Football Federation) Modern Family
4	DF	Caroline Salinas	December 5, 1996 (aged 28)	(Panamanian Football Federation) El Bosque Villa 9
5	DF	Estefanía Salas	September 1, 1997 (aged 28)	(The Football Association) Chiltern
6	DF	Ariadna Abadia	May 31, 2004 (aged 21)	(Panamanian Football Federation) El Bosque Villa 9
7	FP	Kenia Rangel	August 6, 1995 (aged 30)	(Costa Rican Football Federation) LD Alajuelense
8	MF	Laurie Batista	May 29, 1996 (aged 29)	(Panamanian Football Federation) Chorrillo
9	FP	Arianys Arguelles	August 8, 1991 (aged 34)	(Panamanian Football Federation) El Bosque Villa 9
10	FP	Gloria Sáenz	July 2, 2002 (aged 23)	(Panamanian Football Federation) Chorrillo
11	FP	Erika Hernández	March 17, 1999 (aged 26)	(Panamanian Football Federation) UMECIT
12	GK	Mariam Sanjur	September 14, 2003 (aged 22)	(Panamanian Football Federation) Districts Talents
13	FP	Elibeth Vasquez	January 22, 2002 (aged 23)	(Panamanian Football Federation) Evelia
14	DF	María Montenegro	September 17, 2000 (aged 25)	(Panamanian Football Federation) Santa Fé
