= Angola women's national futsal team =

Angola
- Nickname(s): Welwitchias
- Association: Angolan Football Federation
- Confederation: CAF (Africa)
- Top scorer: Irene (2)
- FIFA code: ANG
- FIFA ranking: 85 ▼1 (8 May 2026)
Home colours	Away colours

First international
- Angola 1–7 Spain (Fortaleza, Brazil; 5 December 2011)

Biggest win
- Angola 5–2 Guinea (Rabat, Morocco; 22 April 2025)

Biggest defeat
- Brazil 12–0 Angola (Fortaleza, Brazil; 7 December 2011)

Women's Futsal Africa Cup of Nations
- Appearances: 1 (First in 2025)
- Best result: 4th place (2025)

The Angola women's national futsal team (Portuguese: Seleção Angolana de Futsal Feminino) represents Angola in international women's futsal, and is governed by the Angolan Football Federation (FAF).

== History ==
With no official continental or international women's futsal tournaments, only a few countries had women's futsal teams. Angola was the first African nation to establish a women's futsal team in 2011, making its debut at the 2011 Women's Futsal World Tournament against some of the sport's giants. The team played its first match on 5 December 2011, against Spain, suffering a 1–7 defeat. In their final group stage match, they endured their heaviest loss to date, a 12–0 loss to the host nation Brazil. After losing their two playoff matches, Angola finished in eighth place.

After a 14-year hiatus, Angola registered for the 2025 Women's Futsal Africa Cup of Nations, the inaugural continental championship, which will also serve as the qualifier for the first-ever 2025 FIFA Futsal Women's World Cup in the Philippines.

== Results and fixtures ==
The following is a list of all-time match results, as well as any future matches that have been scheduled.

Legend

Win Draw Loss Fixtures

=== 2011 ===
5 December 2011 World Tournament	Angola	1–7	Spain	Fortaleza, Brazil
14:00	Irene 3'		Fátima Cervera 8', 26'; Irene 29' (o.g.); Ana Sevilla 30'; Loyde 35' (o.g.); Patrícia González 35'; Sara Moreno 38'	Stadium: Ginásio Paulo Sarasate

6 December 2011 World Tournament	Venezuela	4–0	Angola	Fortaleza, Brazil
16:00	Bárbara 5'; Heide 14'; Yaremi 20'; Helianny 26'			Stadium: Ginásio Paulo Sarasate

7 December 2011 World Tournament	Brazil	12–0	Angola	Fortaleza, Brazil
20:00	Cely 5'; Ariane 8'; Juliana Delgado 10'; Jéssika 12'; Gaby 13', 15', 38'; Luciléia 19', 30'; Jessiquinha 22'; Marcela 25', 39'			Stadium: Ginásio Paulo Sarasate

8 December 2011 World Tournament	Argentina	5–1	Angola	Fortaleza, Brazil
16:00	Carina 4', 5'; Cynthia 6'; Clarissa 19'; Deborah 21'		Irene 22'	Stadium: Ginásio Paulo Sarasate

9 December 2011 World Tournament	Venezuela	6–2	Angola	Fortaleza, Brazil
13:00	Nayre 7'; Ylvi 8'; Yaremi 20'; Helianny 22', 32', 37'		Tarcia 2'; Tuti 33'	Stadium: Ginásio Paulo Sarasate

=== 2025 ===
22 April WAFCON Futsal 2025	Angola	5–2	Guinea	Rabat, Morocco
14:00 WAT (UTC+1)	Joyce 0'32", 36'21"; Lurdinha 11'14"; Bangoura 13'03" (o.g.); Djamila 37'53"	Report	B. Soumah 5'39"; Bangoura 31'27"	Stadium: Salle Moulay Abdellah; Referee: Khalid Hnich (Morocco), Said El Haoud (Morocco)

22 April WAFCON Futsal 2025	Angola	3–1	Egypt	Rabat, Morocco
14:00 WAT (UTC+1)	Djamila 10'53", 32'55"; Beu 38'22"	Report	Asmaaooz 31'41"	Stadium: Salle Moulay Abdellah; Referee: Said El Haoud (Morocco); Referee: Ndubuisi Ukah (Nigeria)

22 April WAFCON Futsal 2025	Angola	1–5	Morocco	Rabat, Morocco
20:00 WAT (UTC+1)	Djamila 17'37"	Report	El Madani 12'47", 33'28"; Erroudany 29'35"; Demraoui 32'02"; Hajri 38'26"	Stadium: Salle Moulay Abdellah; Referee: Abdelakram El Hentati (Tunisia); Referee: Ahmed Gamal (Egypt)

22 April WAFCON Futsal 2025	Cameroon	4–1	Angola	Rabat, Morocco
17:00 WAT (UTC+1)	Elam 27'33", 38'34"; Mbomozomo 37'50"; Beulou 39'03"	Report	Dionisia 36'46"	Stadium: Salle Moulay Abdellah; Referee: Khalid Hnich (Morocco); Referee: Warda Chanai (Algeria)

== Players ==
=== Current squad ===
The following 14 players were called for the inaugural 2025 Women's Futsal Africa Cup of Nations, from April 22 to 30, 2025.

No.	Pos.	Player	Date of birth (age)	Club
1	GK	Nininha	12 August 1999 (age 26)	(Angolan Football Federation) 4 de Junho
2	FW	Abade Pinto	9 June 1999 (age 26)	(Angolan Football Federation) Clube Desportivo Exercito
3	FW	Neuma	27 December 2002 (age 23)	(Angolan Football Federation) Chapesseca do Huambo
4	FW	Merly Camenge	29 January 2007 (age 19)	(Angolan Football Federation) Galacticas da Huila
5	FW	Raquel Banga	21 July 2002 (age 23)	(Angolan Football Federation) SBT Futsal de Luanda
6	FW	Joyce Víctor	5 January 1996 (age 30)	(Angolan Football Federation) Clube do Exercito
7	FW	Beu	28 March 2001 (age 25)	(Angolan Football Federation) Clínica Sagrada Esperança
8	MF	Lurdinha	2 July 1995 (age 30)	(Angolan Football Federation) 4 de Junho
9	FW	Ester António	19 February 2000 (age 26)	(Portuguese Football Federation) 3 d'Agosto 1885
10	MF	Djamila Catombela	9 July 1999 (age 26)	(Portuguese Football Federation) Sporting CP
11	FW	Simba Ngoy	7 April 1993 (age 33)	(Angolan Football Federation) Clube Desportivo Exercito
12	GK	Ambrosia Francisco	8 June 2006 (age 19)	(Angolan Football Federation) Galacticas da Huila
13	FW	Judifat Teixeira	8 February 2006 (age 20)	(Angolan Football Federation) Inter do Namibe
14	FW	Dionísia Jungo	18 August 1999 (age 26)	(Angolan Football Federation) Clínica Sagrada Esperança

== Competitive record ==
=== FIFA Women's Futsal World Cup ===
FIFA Women's Futsal World Cup record
Year	Result	Pld	W	D*	L	GF	GA	GD
(Philippines) 2025	Did not qualify							
Total	0/1	—	—	—	—	—	—	—

=== Women's Futsal Africa Cup of Nations ===
Women's Futsal Africa Cup of Nations record
Year	Result	Pld	W	D*	L	GF	GA	GD
(Morocco) 2025	4th place	4	2	0	2	10	12	–2
Total	1/1	4	2	0	2	10	12	–2

=== Women's Futsal World Tournament ===
Women's Futsal World Tournament record
Year	Result	Pld	W	D*	L	GF	GA	GD
(Spain) 2010	Did not enter							
(Brazil) 2011	8th place	5	0	0	5	4	34	−30
(Portugal) 2012	Did not enter							
(Spain) 2013	Did not enter							
(Costa Rica) 2014	Did not enter							
(Guatemala) 2015	Did not enter							
Total	1/6	5	0	0	5	4	34	−30

== See also ==
- Angola women's national football team
