= Soumia Hady =

Moroccan footballer and futsal player (born 1998)

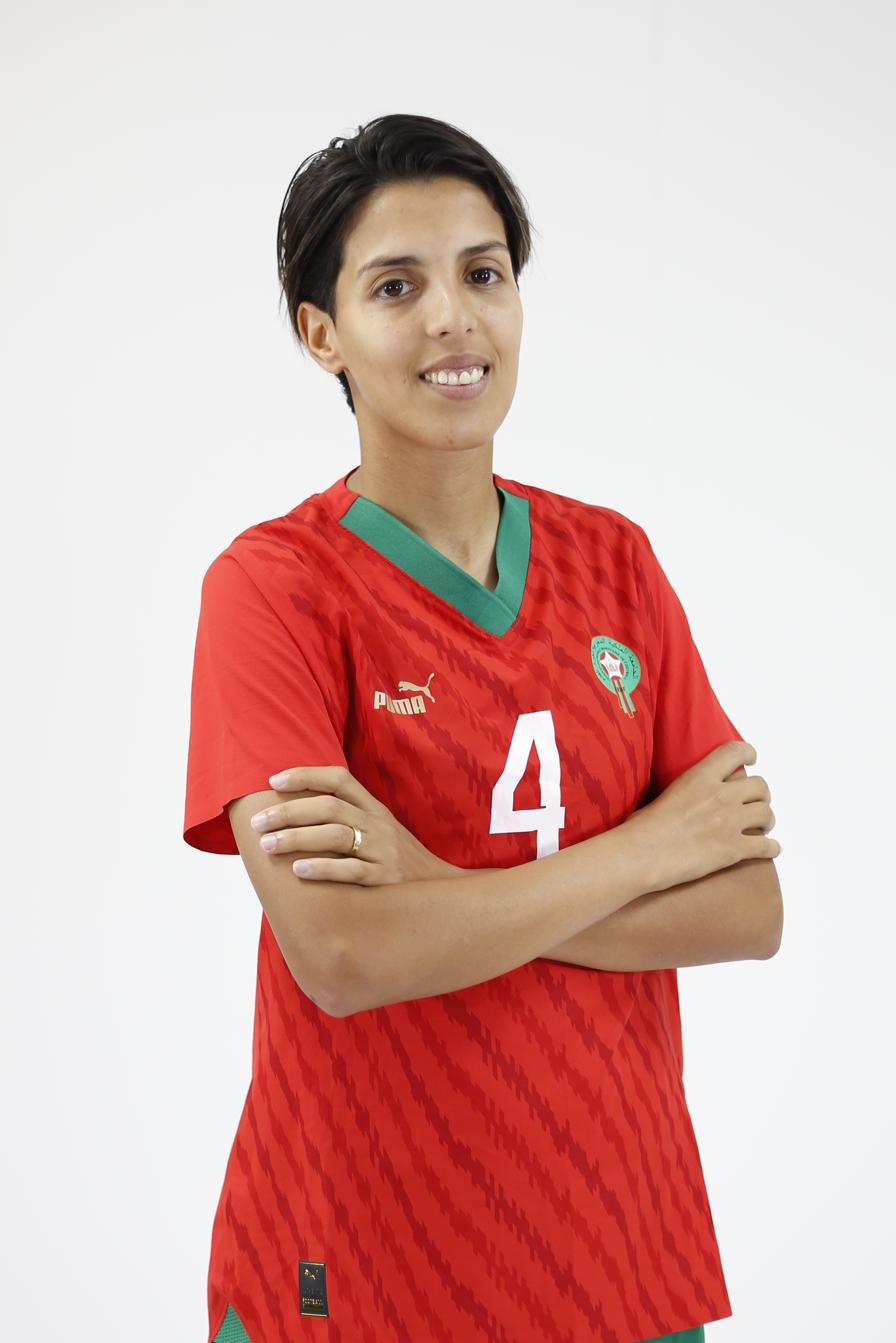
- Hady in 2024

Personal information
- Full name: Soumia Hady
- Date of birth: 30 June 1998 (age 28)
- Place of birth: Berrechid, Morocco
- Positions: Defender; midfielder

Team information
- Current team: Berkane
- Number: 4

Senior career*
Years	Team	Apps	(Gls)
2018–2019	Raja Aïn Harrouda		
2019	AS FAR		
2019–2020	Meknès		
2020–2022	Raja Ait Iazza		
2022–2025	Wydad		
2025–	Berkane		

International career^{‡}
2017–2018	Morocco U20		
2020–	Morocco	3	(0)
2024–	Morocco Futsal		
- * Club domestic league appearances and goals as of 22 August 2026 ‡ National team caps and goals as of 22 August 2026

Soumia Hady (Arabic: سمية هادي, pronounced [sˈmijːa ˈhaːdi]) is a Moroccan footballer and futsal player who plays as a centre-back for Moroccan Women's Championship D1 (Botola Féminine) club RS Berkane and the Morocco national football and futsal teams. She previously played for Botola Féminine clubs Raja Aïn Harrouda, AS FAR, CM Meknès, Raja Ait Iazza and Wydad AC, and has also represented Morocco at under-20 level.

== Club career ==
=== Raja Aït Aizza ===
Hady signed for Moroccan Women's Championship D1 (Botola Féminine) club Raja Ait Iazza (Raja AA) ahead of the 2019–20 season. That season, the club finished runners-up in the Moroccan Women's Throne Cup (which was held on 29 January 2022 due to the competition being delayed as a result of the COVID-19 pandemic).

Hady left Raja AA at the end of the 2021–22, having spent three seasons at the club.

=== Wydad AC ===
Hady signed for Botola Féminine club Wydad AC ahead of the 2022–23 season.

In the 2023–24 season, Wydad finished runners-up in the Throne Cup (which was held on 17 May 2025 due to the competition being delayed as a result of the COVID-19 pandemic).

Hady left Wydad during the 2024–25 season, having spent two and a half seasons at the club.

=== RS Berkane ===
During the 2024–25 season, Hady signed for Botola Féminine club RS Berkane. That season, the finished runners-up in the Throne Cup (which was held on 21 May 2026 due to the competition being delayed as a result of the COVID-19 pandemic).

== International career ==
=== Morocco ===
Hady received her first call-up for the Morocco national team by manager Karim Bencherifa for a two-match friendly series against rivals Algeria on 18 and 22 October 2018 in Morocco, being one of 22 players in the squad playing domestically. Hady was named by American coach and director Kelly Lindsey as part of Morocco's squad for the 2020 UNAF Women's Tournament, held at El Kram Stadium in El Kram, Tunisia. Morocco won the tournament, securing their first ever UNAF Women's Tournament title.

Hady was selected by Spanish manager Jorge Vilda as part of Morocco's 23-player squad for the 2024 Women's Africa Cup of Nations (WAFCON), held on home soil from 5 to 26 July 2025. Morocco finished runners-up in the tournament.

Hady was again selected by Vilda as part of Morocco's 26-player squad for the 2026 WAFCON, once again held on home soil from 25 July to 16 August 2026. Morocco finished fourth at the tournament.

=== Morocco Futsal ===
Hady received her maiden call-up for the Morocco national futsal team when she was selected by manager Adil Sayeh for the 2024 Xanxerê Women's International Tournament (XWIT) at the Arena Ivo Sguissardi in Xanxerê, Santa Catarina, Brazil from 6 to 11 November 2024, which she made her début in. Morocco finished fourth at the tournament, which she played every match in.

Ahead of the 2025 Women's Futsal Africa Cup of Nations, the inaugural edition of the Women's Futsal Africa Cup of Nations (WAFCON) on home soil, Hady was selected for a two-match friendly series against Senegal at the Salle Moulay Abdellah in Rabat, Morocco. She scored her first international futsal goal in the first match (a 13–0 victory), before scoring her first international brace in the second match. She was later named as part of the 14-player squad that the country sent to Futsal WAFCON, which was held at Salle Moulay Abdellah from 22 to 30 April 2025. In the opening match against Namibia in Group A, she scored the third goal in what resulted in an 8–1 victory for the Atlas Lionesses. Morocco won the tournament, winning their first major trophy in international women's futsal and becoming the first ever Futsal WAFCON champions.

Hady was again selected by Sayeh for the 2025 XWIT from 20 to 24 August 2025, with Morocco finishing third this time. She once again played in every single match at the tournament. Later that year, Hady was named as part of Morocco's 14-player squad for the 2025 FIFA Futsal Women's World Cup in the Philippines from 21 November to 7 December 2025, which was the first edition that Morocco had qualified for (having done so through Futsal WAFCON earlier that year). Morocco finished second in Group A (with her playing all of the group stage matches) before being eliminated in the quarter-finals.

== Honours ==
Raja Ait Iazza

- Moroccan Women's Throne Cup — runners-up: 2019–20

Wydad AC

- Moroccan Women's Throne Cup — runners-up: 2023–24

RS Berkane

- Moroccan Women's Throne Cup — runners-up: 2024–25

Morocco

- UNAF Women's Tournament – champions: 2020
- Women's Africa Cup of Nations – runners-up: 2024

Morocco Futsal

- Women's Futsal Africa Cup of Nations — champions: 2025
- Xanxerê Women's International Tournament — third place: 2025
