= Doha El Madani =

Moroccan footballer (born 2005)

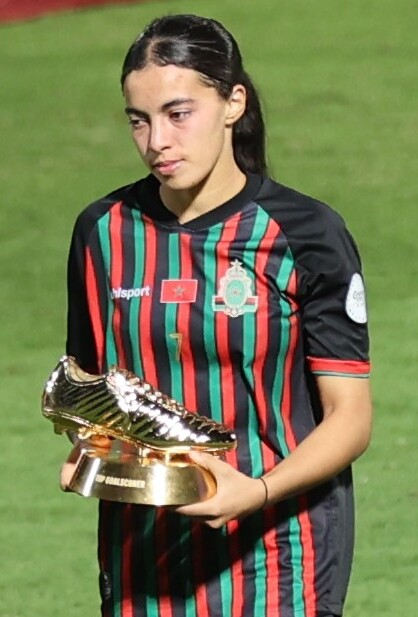
- El Madani with the 2024 CAF WCL golden boot

Personal information
- Date of birth: 20 October 2005 (age 21)
- Place of birth: Morocco
- Height: 1.65 m (5 ft 5 in)
- Position: Forward

Team information
- Current team: AS FAR
- Number: 7

Youth career
- 2022–2023: Etoiles de l'Avenir

Senior career*
Years	Team	Apps	(Gls)
2023–	AS FAR	42	(27)

International career^{‡}
2021–2022	Morocco U17		
2021–2024	Morocco U20		
2025–	Morocco Futsal		
- * Club domestic league appearances and goals as of 12 April 2025 ‡ National team caps and goals as of 30 April 2025

Doha El Madani (born 20 October 2005) is a Moroccan footballer who plays as a forward for ASFAR, the Morocco women's national team and Morocco women's national futsal team.

== Club career ==
Madani has played for ASFAR in Morocco, appearing at the 2024 CAF Women's Champions League. She finished as the top goalscorer at the end of the competition with AS FAR placing second, losing to TP Mazembe in the final. Thanks to her performances, she was nominated for the CAF Awards 2024 in the Young Player and Inter-club Player of the Year categories.

== International career ==
Madani has played for Morocco's under-17 and under-20 women's national team.

She also played for Morocco women's national futsal team in the 2025 Women's Futsal Africa Cup of Nations, and was "Woman of the Match" in the semi-final game against Angola, which ended with a 5–1 victory. Morocco went on to win the cup in a 3–2 victory against Tanzania, in which El Madani scored the first goal for Morocco. She received top scorer award with 5 goals in the whole tournament.

== Career statistics ==
=== Club ===
As of match played 12 April 2025

Appearances and goals by club, season and competition
Club	Season	League			National cup		Continental		Total	
Club	Season	Division	Apps	Goals	Apps	Goals	Apps	Goals	Apps	Goals
AS FAR	2023–24	Moroccan Championship	20	9	6	0	—		26	9
AS FAR	2024–25	Moroccan Championship	22	18	1	1	5	6	28	25
AS FAR	Total		42	27	7	1	5	6	54	34

== Honours ==
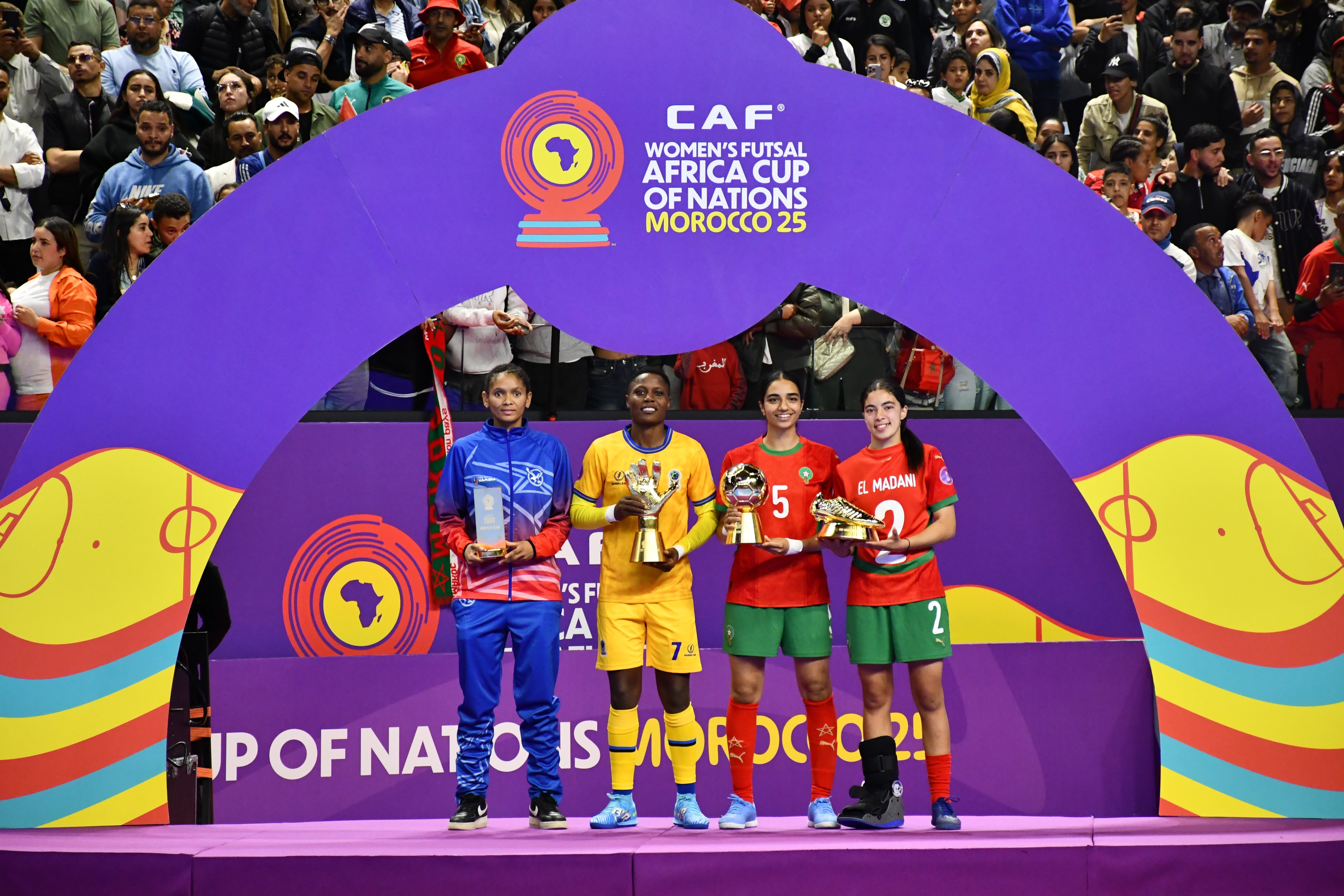
El Madani (right) receiving her award as top scorer of the 2025 Women's Futsal Africa Cup of Nations

AS FAR

- Moroccan Women's Championship: 2024, 2025
- Moroccan Women Throne Cup: 2022, 2023, 2024
- CAF Women's Champions League: 2025;runner-up: 2024

Morocco U20

- UNAF U-20 Women's Tournament: 2023

Morocco Futsal

- Women's Futsal Africa Cup of Nations: 2025

Individual

- African Women's Youth Player of the Year: 2024, 2025
- CAF Women's Champions League Top Scorer: 2024
- Women's Futsal Africa Cup of Nations Top Scorer: 2025
- Moroccan Women's Championship Young player of the Year: 2025
