= Egypt women's national futsal team =

Egypt
- Association: Egyptian Football Association
- Confederation: CAF (Africa)
- FIFA code: EGY
- FIFA ranking: 86 ▼1 (8 May 2026)
Home colours	Away colours

First international
- Angola 3–1 Egypt (Rabat, Morocco; 24 April 2025)

Biggest win
- Madagascar 2–4 Egypt (Rabat, Morocco; 29 April 2025)

Biggest defeat
- Angola 3–1 Egypt (Rabat, Morocco; 24 April 2025)

Women's Futsal Africa Cup of Nations
- Appearances: 1 (First in 2025)
- Best result: Fifth place (2025)

The Egypt women's national futsal team (Arabic: منتخب مصر لكرة الصالات للسيدات) represents Egypt in international futsal competitions and is governed by the Egyptian Football Association (EFA), the governing body of football and futsal in the country.

== History ==
Although Egypt had women's futsal teams that represented the country internationally, the Egyptian Football Association only established the senior team in May 2022, with the staff led by coach Abdel Fatah Abbas, and held their first open camp that same month. In May 2023, Nader Rashad was named as head coach, replacing Abbas in the lead-up to the first Women's Futsal Africa Cup of Nations, which will serve as the qualifying tournament for the first-ever World Cup.

== Players ==
=== Current squad ===
The following 14 players were called up for the 2025 Women's Futsal Africa Cup of Nations from 22 to 30 April 2025.

No.	Pos.	Player	Date of birth (age)	Club
1	GK	Farah Samir	2 July 2001 (age 25)	(Egyptian Football Association) Wadi Degla SC
2	MF	Nourhan Ashour	10 May 2004 (age 22)	(Egyptian Football Association) NBE SC
3	DF	Malak Amr	15 December 2006 (age 19)	(Egyptian Football Association) El Gouna FC
4	DF	Fatma Mostafa	6 September 2006 (age 19)	(Egyptian Football Association) FC Masar
5	FW	Basmala Fathy	27 August 2005 (age 20)	(Egyptian Football Association) Pyramids FC
6	MF	Nada Samara	3 December 2005 (age 20)	(Egyptian Football Association) Pyramids FC
7	MF	Nada El Gharib	6 June 2002 (age 24)	(Egyptian Football Association) Pyramids FC
8	FW	Mirna Mohsen	5 February 1996 (age 30)	(Egyptian Football Association) FC Masar
9	FW	Shrouk Ibrahim	19 June 2001 (age 25)	(Egyptian Football Association) NBE SC
10	FW	Asmaa Aly	5 September 1994 (age 31)	(Portuguese Football Federation) Rio Ave F.C.
11	MF	Amina Walid	15 August 2005 (age 20)	(Egyptian Football Association) Smouha SC
12	GK	Souhayla Hussein	20 January 2000 (age 26)	(Egyptian Football Association) Pyramids FC
13	FW	Esraa Farag	18 September 2002 (age 23)	(Egyptian Football Association) Aviation Club
14	MF	Yara Sabry	21 March 1999 (age 27)	(Egyptian Football Association) ZED FC

== Competitive record ==
=== FIFA Futsal Women's World Cup ===
FIFA Futsal Women's World Cup record
Year	Position	Pld	W	D*	L	GF	GA	GD
(Philippines) 2025	Did not qualify							
Total	0/1	—	—	—	—	—	—	—

*Draws include knockout matches decided on penalty kicks.

=== CAF Women's Futsal Africa Cup of Nations ===
Women's Futsal Africa Cup of Nations record
Year	Position	Pld	W	D*	L	GF	GA	GD
(Morocco) 2025	Fifth place	3	1	1	1	8	8	0
Total	1/1	3	1	1	1	8	8	0

*Draws include knockout matches decided on penalty kicks.

== See also ==
- Egypt women's national football team
