= Jasmine Demraoui =

Moroccan futsal player (born 2004)

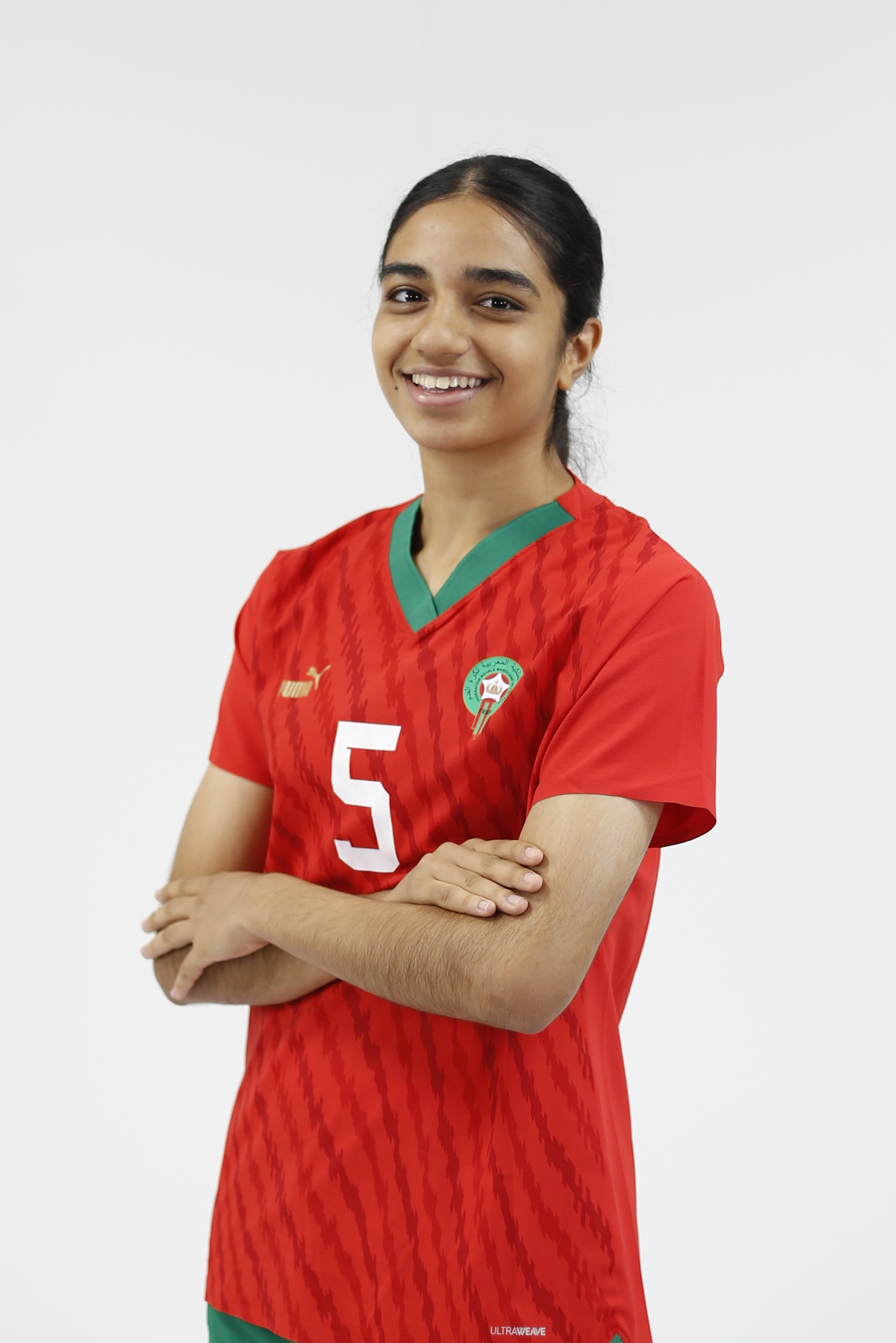

Personal information
- Date of birth: 21 January 2004 (age 22)
- Place of birth: Saint-Claude, France
- Height: 1.67 m (5 ft 6 in)
- Position: Forward

Team information
- Current team: US Saint-Vit (football); Besançon Académie Futsal (futsal)

Youth career
- 2019–2021: Jura Sud Foot

Senior career*
Years	Team	Apps	(Gls)
2021–2024	Jura Sud Foot		
2024–	US Saint-Vit		

International career
2024–	Morocco futsal		
- * Club domestic league appearances and goals

Jasmine Demraoui (Arabic: جاسمين دمراوي; born 21 January 2004) is a footballer and futsal player who plays as a forward for Bourgogne-Franche-Comté in the Regional 1 Féminine in football and for Besançon Académie in futsal. Born in France, she plays for the Moroccan national futsal team.

== Club career ==
Formed at Jura Sud Foot, Demraoui progressed through the youth ranks and contributed to the senior team's promotion to Régional 1 in 2023. She signed with US Saint-Vit in 2024, scoring on her debut and winning the regional cup in her first season.

Alongside her football career, Demraoui also competes in futsal with Besançon Académie Futsal thanks to a dual licence, which she joined in 2022.

== International career ==
Demraoui received her first call-up to the Morocco women's national futsal team in July 2024 under coach Adil Sayeh, making her international debut on 6 August 2024 against Brazil during the 2024 Xanxerê International Tournament. She scored her first international goal in the same competition against Argentina.

Following her debut, she established herself as a regular member of the squad, featuring in Morocco's preparation program and scoring in several friendlies against Bahrain, Iraq and the Czech Republic. In April 2025, she was named in Morocco's final squad for the 2025 Women's Futsal Africa Cup of Nations. She featured in every match as Morocco claimed the title, registering a brace against Namibia, scoring in the semi-final against Angola and netting the decisive goal in the final against Tanzania. Her performances earned her the CAF Player of the Tournament award.

Her role in the continental triumph contributed to her selection for the inaugural 2025 FIFA Futsal Women's World Cup later that year. In the Philippines, she again featured in all of Morocco's matches and scored twice in the group stage, helping the team reach the quarter-finals for the first time in its history.

== Honours ==
=== National team ===
- Women's Futsal Africa Cup of Nations: 2025

=== Club ===
- Bourgogne-Franche-Comté Regional Cup: 2025

=== Individual ===
- Women's Futsal Africa Cup of Nations Best player: 2025
