= 2025 Women's Futsal Africa Cup of Nations =

Women's Futsal Africa Cup of Nations 2025

Tournament details
- Host country: Morocco
- City: Rabat
- Dates: 22 – 30 April
- Teams: 9 (from 1 confederation)
- Venue: 1 (in 1 host city)

Final positions
- Champions: Morocco (1st title)
- Runners-up: Tanzania
- Third place: Cameroon
- Fourth place: Angola

Tournament statistics
- Matches played: 15
- Goals scored: 103 (6.87 per match)
- Top scorer(s): (Morocco) Doha El Madani (5 goals)
- Best player: (Morocco) Jasmine Demraoui
- Best goalkeeper: (Tanzania) Najiati Idrisa
- Fair play award: Namibia

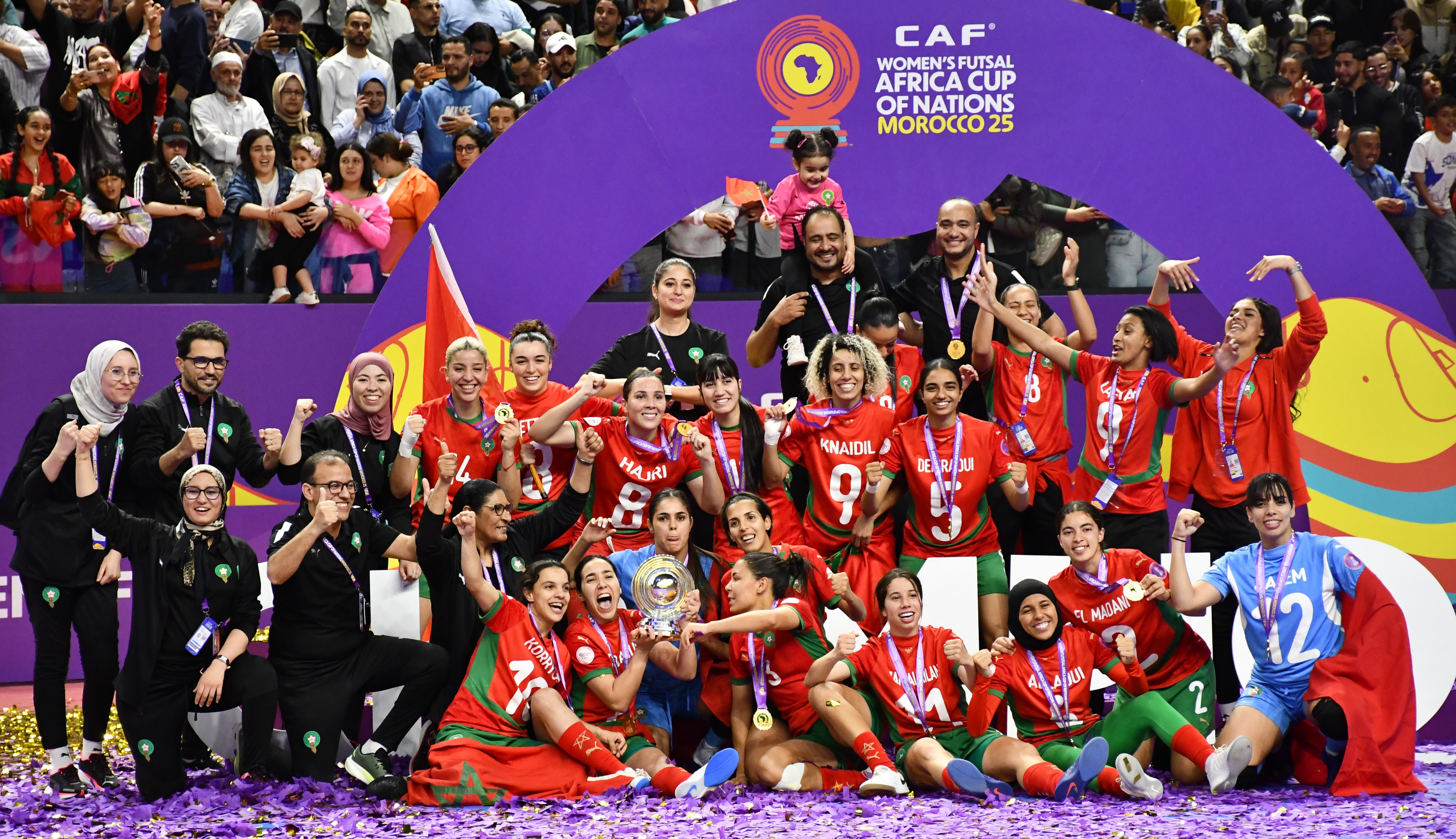
Morocco's national team celebrating the trophy.

The 2025 Women's Futsal Africa Cup of Nations (Arabic: كأس أمم أفريقيا لكرة الصالات للسيدات 2025) was the inaugural edition of the Women's Futsal Africa Cup of Nations, the biennial international women's futsal competition in Africa, organised by the Confederation of African Football (CAF). The tournament took place in Rabat, Morocco, from 22 to 30 April 2025, and will double as the African qualifiers for the 2025 FIFA Futsal Women's World Cup in the Philippines.

Morocco defeated Tanzania 3–2 in the final, scoring the winning goal just 11 seconds before the end of regulation time to become the inaugural champions of the competition.

== Host selection ==
Following the introduction of the FIFA Futsal Women's World Cup in October 2023, the CAF Executive Committee, at its meeting on 21 October 2024, decided to establish African qualifiers for the competition. By the deadline, two football associations had submitted their bids to host the tournament.

- Egypt
- Morocco

On 26 January 2024, CAF selected Morocco to host the final tournament.

== Teams ==
For the inaugural edition, a total of 9 out of 56 CAF member associations participated in the competition, representing all five CAF subregions.

- Angola
- Cameroon
- Egypt
- Guinea
- Madagascar
- Morocco
- Namibia
- Senegal
- Tanzania

== Draw ==
The draw was held on 13 February 2025 at 13:00 EST (UTC+2) at the CAF headquarters in Cairo, Egypt.

=== Seeding ===
The 9 teams were drawn into three groups of three teams, with hosts Morocco automatically placed into the first position of Group A. The remaining 8 teams were placed in a single pot and drawn one by one to fill the remaining positions.

Seeded	Unseeded
Morocco (Host)	Angola; Cameroon; Egypt; Guinea; Madagascar; Namibia; Senegal; Tanzania

=== Draw results ===
The draw resulted in the following groups:

Group A
Pos	Team
A1	Morocco
A2	Cameroon
A3	Namibia

Group B
Pos	Team
B1	Angola
B2	Egypt
B3	Guinea

Group C
Pos	Team
C1	Madagascar
C2	Tanzania
C3	Senegal

== Squads ==
Team squads

Angola

No.	Pos.	Player	Date of birth (age)	Club
1	GK	Nininha	12 August 1999 (aged 25)	(Angolan Football Federation) 4 de Junho
2	FW	Abade	9 June 1999 (aged 25)	(Angolan Football Federation) Clube Desportivo Exercito
3	FW	Neuma	27 December 2002 (aged 22)	(Angolan Football Federation) Chapesseca do Huambo
4	FW	Merly	29 January 2007 (aged 18)	(Angolan Football Federation) Galacticas da Huila
5	FW	Raquel	21 July 2002 (aged 22)	(Angolan Football Federation) SBT Futsal de Luanda
6	FW	Joyce	5 January 1996 (aged 29)	(Angolan Football Federation) Clube do Exercito
7	FW	Beu	28 March 2001 (aged 24)	(Angolan Football Federation) Clínica Sagrada Esperança
8	MF	Lurdinha	2 July 1995 (aged 29)	(Angolan Football Federation) 4 de Junho
9	FW	Ester	19 February 2000 (aged 25)	(Portuguese Football Federation) 3 d'Agosto 1885
10	MF	Djamila	9 July 1999 (aged 25)	(Portuguese Football Federation) Sporting de Portugal
11	FW	Simba	7 April 1993 (aged 32)	(Angolan Football Federation) Clube Desportivo Exercito
12	GK	Ambrosia	8 June 2006 (aged 18)	(Angolan Football Federation) Galacticas da Huila
13	FW	Judifat	8 February 2006 (aged 19)	(Angolan Football Federation) Inter do Namibe
14	FW	Dionisia	18 August 1999 (aged 25)	(Angolan Football Federation) Clínica Sagrada Esperança

Cameroon

Head coach: Louis René Epée

No.	Pos.	Player	Date of birth (age)	Club
1	GK	Caliste Ngah	1 March 2006 (aged 19)	(Cameroonian Football Federation) AS FAP
2	GK	Dafna Tchiwu	5 August 2006 (aged 18)	(Cameroonian Football Federation) Authentic Ladies
3	MF	Miranda Kuemene	19 February 2002 (aged 23)	(Cameroonian Football Federation) AS Menoua
4	DF	Natacha Elam	5 December 2001 (aged 23)	(Cameroonian Football Federation) FC Ebolowa
5	FW	Ashley Ndifone	1 January 2007 (aged 18)	(Cameroonian Football Federation)
6	MF	Marie Princesse Ngon	28 December 2007 (aged 17)	(Cameroonian Football Federation) Cyclone FF
7	FW	Brunelle Beulou	30 May 2001 (aged 23)	(Cameroonian Football Federation) FC Ebolowa
8	MF	Brigitte Mbomozomo	3 October 2002 (aged 22)	(Cameroonian Football Federation) AS FAP
9	DF	Balkissou Pekure	1 January 2008 (aged 17)	(Cameroonian Football Federation) Petrichor FA
10	MF	Saint Esprit Sah Ndaowa	17 February 2008 (aged 17)	(Cameroonian Football Federation) Bembale
11	MF	Aurore Tsimi	25 December 2007 (aged 17)	(Cameroonian Football Federation) Louves Minproff
12	MF	Daniella Happi	10 September 2006 (aged 18)	(Cameroonian Football Federation) Eclair FC
13	DF	Nadine Tendiangku	21 December 2006 (aged 18)	(Cameroonian Football Federation) Authentic Ladies
14	DF	Ange Massontie	28 August 2005 (aged 19)	(Cameroonian Football Federation) AS FAP

Egypt

Head coach: Nader Rashad

No.	Pos.	Player	Date of birth (age)	Club
1	GK	Farah Samir	2 July 2001 (aged 23)	(Egyptian Football Association) Wadi Degla SC
2	MF	Nourhan Ashour	10 May 2004 (aged 20)	(Egyptian Football Association) NBE SC
3	DF	Malak Amr	15 December 2006 (aged 18)	(Egyptian Football Association) El Gouna FC
4	DF	Fatma Mostafa	6 September 2006 (aged 18)	(Egyptian Football Association) FC Masar
5	FW	Basmala Fathy	27 August 2005 (aged 19)	(Egyptian Football Association) Pyramids FC
6	MF	Nada Samara	3 December 2005 (aged 19)	(Egyptian Football Association) Pyramids FC
7	MF	Nada El Gharib	6 June 2002 (aged 22)	(Egyptian Football Association) Pyramids FC
8	FW	Mirna Mohsen	5 February 1996 (aged 29)	(Egyptian Football Association) FC Masar
9	FW	Shrouk Ibrahim	19 June 2001 (aged 23)	(Egyptian Football Association) NBE SC
10	FW	Asmaa Aly	5 September 1994 (aged 30)	(Portuguese Football Federation) Rio Ave F.C.
11	MF	Amina Walid	15 August 2005 (aged 19)	(Egyptian Football Association) Smouha SC
12	GK	Souhayla Hussein	20 January 2000 (aged 25)	(Egyptian Football Association) Pyramids FC
13	FW	Esraa Farag	18 September 2002 (aged 22)	(Egyptian Football Association) Aviation
14	MF	Yara Sabry	21 March 1999 (aged 26)	(Egyptian Football Association) ZED FC

Guinea

No.	Pos.	Player	Date of birth (age)	Club
1	GK	Aicha Conté	4 November 2011 (aged 13)	(Guinean Football Federation) AS Bolonta
2	MF	Rouguiatou Dramé	19 April 2006 (aged 19)	(Guinean Football Federation) Kul Sport
3	MF	Aminata Soumah	15 December 2005 (aged 19)	(Guinean Football Federation) ASFAG
4	MF	Aminata Bangoura	3 July 2005 (aged 19)	(Guinean Football Federation) USFG
5	MF	Aminata Youla	15 June 2003 (aged 21)	(Guinean Football Federation) Guinée Foot Élite
6	MF	Aminata Conté	28 May 2009 (aged 15)	(Guinean Football Federation) FC Sangbala
7	FW	Saran Sidibé	28 March 2006 (aged 19)	(Guinean Football Federation) Espoirs de Yimbaya
8	FW	N'Youla Diallo	7 October 2008 (aged 16)	(Guinean Football Federation) Guinée Foot Élite
9	DF	Lucienne Mara	28 November 2009 (aged 15)	(Guinean Football Federation) Académie Emmanuel Tolno
10	MF	Mamet Camara	1 January 2003 (aged 22)	(Guinean Football Federation) Espoir de Yimbaya
11	FW	Bountouraby Soumah	3 March 2010 (aged 15)	(Guinean Football Federation) Académie Emmanuel Tolno
12	GK	Fatoumata Conté	28 May 2005 (aged 19)	(Guinean Football Federation) FC Sangbala
13	DF	Mariame Harouna Yattara	10 February 2006 (aged 19)	(Guinean Football Federation) FC Sangbala
14	MF	Mariam Soumah	12 January 2003 (aged 22)	(Guinean Football Federation) JTK

Madagascar

Head coach: Steeve Princy Manitriniaina

No.	Pos.	Player	Date of birth (age)	Club
1	GK	Anastasie Soanarivo	5 February 2005 (aged 20)	(Malagasy Football Federation) ASCUF
2	DF	Jessica Andriainirinaiana	3 January 2010 (aged 15)	(Malagasy Football Federation) Disciples FC
3	MF	Farella Ravelomanana	17 December 2003 (aged 21)	(Malagasy Football Federation) ASCUF
4	DF	Tantely Raheritiana	26 January 2008 (aged 17)	(Malagasy Football Federation) ASKAM AFA
5	FW	Andoniana Rasamison	31 January 1999 (aged 26)	(Comoros Football Federation) Etoile du Centre
6	MF	Marie Clara Raveloarisoa	3 August 2003 (aged 21)	(Malagasy Football Federation) AJSM
7	DF	Faridah Razafimanantsoa	2 July 1997 (aged 27)	(Malagasy Football Federation) AJSM
8	MF	Jenny Randriamialimanantsoa	25 May 2006 (aged 18)	(Malagasy Football Federation) ASKAM AFA
9	MF	Iriko Rakotoarimanana	13 July 2007 (aged 17)	(Malagasy Football Federation) Disciples FC
10	MF	Tsilavina Rondromalala	15 April 2004 (aged 21)	(Malagasy Football Federation) Disciples FC
11	MF	Franca Mbolaniana	17 April 2002 (aged 23)	(Malagasy Football Federation) Disciples FC
12	DF	Emilienne Solange	8 May 1993 (aged 31)	(Malagasy Football Federation) ASCUF
13	MF	Larissa Razafindramanana	12 October 1995 (aged 29)	(Malagasy Football Federation) Disciples FC
14	GK	Chrystina Faraniaina	4 November 2003 (aged 21)	(Malagasy Football Federation) Disciples FC

Morocco

Head coach: Adil Sayeh

No.	Pos.	Player	Date of birth (age)	Club
1	GK	Kawtar Bentaleb	13 February 1999 (aged 26)	(Royal Moroccan Football Federation) FUS Rabat
2	FW	Doha El Madani	20 October 2005 (aged 19)	(Royal Moroccan Football Federation) AS FAR
3	FW	Zineb Erroudany	1 November 2003 (aged 21)	(Royal Moroccan Football Federation) AS FAR
4	DF	Soumia Hady	30 June 1998 (aged 26)	(Royal Moroccan Football Federation) Wydad AC
5	FW	Jasmine Demraoui	21 January 2004 (aged 21)	(French Football Federation) Besançon AF
6	FW	Kenza Allaoui	2 November 1999 (aged 25)	(Albanian Football Federation) KFF Gramshi
7	DF	Siham Tadlaoui	26 January 1989 (aged 36)	(Royal Moroccan Football Federation) JN Larache
8	FW	Meryem Hajri	14 September 1994 (aged 30)	(Royal Moroccan Football Federation) Union Touarga
9	FW	Chirine Knaidil	19 February 1994 (aged 31)	(Royal Moroccan Football Federation) FUS Rabat
10	FP	Drissia Korrych	30 January 1993 (aged 32)	(Royal Moroccan Football Federation) RS Berkane
11	FP	Malak Zaid AlKilani	3 March 2004 (aged 21)	(Royal Moroccan Football Federation) Wydad AC
12	GK	Chaimae Aasem	30 October 1997 (aged 27)	(Royal Moroccan Football Federation) Wydad AC
13	FW	Rajae Lazaar	21 December 2003 (aged 21)	(Royal Moroccan Football Federation) Wydad AC
14	FW	Amal El Aoufi	1 September 1999 (aged 25)	(Royal Moroccan Football Federation) Hilal Temara

Namibia

Head coach: Donalwald Modise

No.	Pos.	Player	Date of birth (age)	Club
1	GK	Agnes Kauzuu	22 December 1992 (aged 32)	(Namibia Football Association) Ongos Ladies
2	DF	Mbitjitandjambi Mungunda	25 September 1999 (aged 25)	(Namibia Football Association) Ongos Ladies
3	FW	Kamunikire Tjituka	13 June 1998 (aged 26)	(Namibia Football Association) Beauties FC
4	DF	Albertina Aludhilu	8 January 2000 (aged 25)	(Namibia Football Association) windhoek city FC
5	DF	Twaudika Mulundu	27 January 1998 (aged 27)	(Namibia Football Association) UNAM Bokkies FC
6	MF	Diane Kock	23 March 2004 (aged 21)	(Namibia Football Association) Beauties FC
7	FW	Fiola Vliete	22 October 1998 (aged 26)	(Namibia Football Association) Beauties FC
8	FW	Memory Ngonda	11 February 1998 (aged 27)	(Namibia Football Association) Ongos Ladies
9	FW	Muhinatjo Hanavi	11 February 2003 (aged 22)	(Namibia Football Association) UNAM Bokkies FC
10	MF	Millicent Hikuam	6 July 1998 (aged 26)	(Namibia Football Association) Beauties FC
11	FW	Charlotte Richter	30 May 2006 (aged 18)	(Namibia Football Association) windhoek city FC
12	MF	Hillary Gonteb	23 November 1999 (aged 25)	(Namibia Football Association) UNAM Bokkies FC
13	GK	Melissa Matheus	14 June 1998 (aged 26)	(Namibia Football Association) Beauties FC
14	GK	Queandra Kasume Batista	7 January 1999 (aged 26)	(Namibia Football Association) UNAM Bokkies FC

Senegal

Head coach: Mamadou Lamine Mboup

No.	Pos.	Player	Date of birth (age)	Club
1	GK	Evelyne Gomis	8 March 2005 (aged 20)	(French Football Federation) Joliot Groom's Futsal
2	DF	Aïcha Kalès	2 February 2004 (aged 21)	(Senegalese Football Federation) Dakar Sacré-Cœur
3	FW	Maimouna Ba	1 January 2007 (aged 18)	(Senegalese Football Federation) Lycée Ameth Fall
4	FW	Mariama Faty	10 January 2009 (aged 16)	(Senegalese Football Federation) AS Kumaré
5	FW	Daro Niang	5 February 2002 (aged 23)	(Senegalese Football Federation) AS Bambey
6	MF	Sokhna Tall Pène	11 November 2006 (aged 18)	(Senegalese Football Federation) AS Bambey
7	FW	Ndeyesha Mendy	19 September 2004 (aged 20)	(French Football Federation) EU Torcy Futsal
8	MF	Mariama Diedhiou	26 March 1989 (aged 36)	(Senegalese Football Federation) Jappo Olympique Club
9	MF	Adama Dramé	15 March 1999 (aged 26)	(French Football Federation) EU Torcy Futsal
10	DF	Juliette Kalamo	10 January 2005 (aged 20)	(Senegalese Football Federation) ASCE La Linguère
11	DF	Sadio Sy	14 December 1999 (aged 25)	(Senegalese Football Federation) AS Bambey
12	GK	Awa Baldé	30 July 2009 (aged 15)	(Senegalese Football Federation) Dakar Sacré-Cœur
13	DF	Aissatou Diadhiou	8 September 1991 (aged 33)	(French Football Federation) AS Bel-air
14	DF	Ndeye Ndiaye Kané	1 June 1995 (aged 29)	(Senegalese Football Federation) AS Bambey

Tanzania

No.	Pos.	Player	Date of birth (age)	Club
1	GK	Asha Mrisho	10 February 2004 (aged 21)	(Tanzania Football Federation) Mashujaa Queens
2	DF	Anastazia Katunzi	29 January 1996 (aged 29)	(Tanzania Football Federation) JKT Queens
3	MF	Jamila Mnunduka	10 November 2007 (aged 17)	(Tanzania Football Federation) JKT Queens
4	MF	Vioeth Mwamakamba	9 February 2005 (aged 20)	(Tanzania Football Federation) Simba Queens
5	DF	Fatuma Suleimani	6 April 1995 (aged 30)	(Tanzania Football Federation) Simba Queens
6	DF	Donisia Minja	9 August 1996 (aged 28)	(Tanzania Football Federation) JKT Queens
7	GK	Najiati Idrisa	2 April 1997 (aged 28)	(Tanzania Football Federation) JKT Queens
8	FW	Stumai Athuman	25 August 1997 (aged 27)	(Tanzania Football Federation) JKT Queens
9	MF	Janeth Nyangali	13 February 2006 (aged 19)	(Tanzania Football Federation)
10	MF	Aisha Mnunka	26 July 2005 (aged 19)	(Tanzania Football Federation) Simba Queens
11	MF	Elizabeth Chenge	25 July 2011 (aged 13)	(Tanzania Football Federation) JKT Queens
12	MF	Janeth Pangamwene	27 November 2000 (aged 24)	(Tanzania Football Federation) JKT Queens
13	MF	Zawadi Athuman	20 February 2006 (aged 19)	(Tanzania Football Federation) Simba Queens
14	FW	Shelda Mafuru	28 March 1997 (aged 28)	(Tanzania Football Federation) Simba Queens

== Group stage ==
All times are local, CET (UTC+1).

=== Group A ===
Pos	Team	Pld	W	D	L	GF	GA	GD	Pts	Qualification
1	Morocco (H)	2	2	0	0	15	2	+13	6	Semi-finals
2	Cameroon	2	1	0	1	7	12	−5	3	Semi-finals
3	Namibia	2	0	0	2	6	14	−8	0	

Source: CAF
Rules for classification: 1) Points; 2) head-to-head matches; 3) Goal difference; 4) Number of goals scored.
(H) Hosts
22 April 2025
20:00

Morocco	8–1	Namibia
Zaid AlKilani 2'36"; El Madani 4'54"; Hady 8'27"; El Aoufi 13'23"; Tadlaoui 19'50"; Korrych 23'38"; Demraoui 28'54", 36'30"	Report (FRMF)	Vliete 24'01"

Salle Moulay Abdellah, Rabat
Referee: Ali Al-Ayat (Libya)
Referee: José Katchingavisa (Angola)

24 April 2025
20:00

Morocco	7–1	Cameroon
El Aoufi 3'36"; Mbomozomo 11'34" (o.g.); Knaidil 14'43"; Hajri 27'57"; El Madani 32'02"; Tadlaoui 39'32"; Zaid AlKilani 39'50"	Report (FRMF)	Beulou 16'11"

Salle Moulay Abdellah, Rabat
Referee: Abdelakram El Hentati (Tunisia)
Referee: Mariette Aguie (Ivory Coast)

26 April 2025
20:00

Cameroon	6–5	Namibia
Beulou 12'23"; Tsimi 12'47"; Happi 24'57"; Mbomozomo 25'36", 27'57", 33'43"	Report (CAF)	Hanavi 2'44", 17'58"; Mbomozomo 10'41" (o.g.); Ngonda 31'51"; Mungunda 38'09"

Salle Moulay Abdellah, Rabat
Referee: Abdelakram El Hentati (Tunisia)
Referee: Elhadji Diéme (Senegal)

=== Group B ===
Pos	Team	Pld	W	D	L	GF	GA	GD	Pts	Qualification
1	Angola	2	2	0	0	8	3	+5	6	Semi-finals
2	Egypt	2	0	1	1	4	6	−2	1	Fifth place game
3	Guinea	2	0	1	1	5	8	−3	1	Seventh place game

Source: CAF
Rules for classification: 1) Points; 2) head-to-head matches; 3) Goal difference; 4) Number of goals scored.
22 April 2025
14:00

Angola	5–2	Guinea
Joyce 0'32", 36'21"; Lurdinha 11'14"; Bangoura 13'03" (o.g.); Djamila 37'53"	Report (CAF)	B. Soumah 5'39"; Bangoura 31'27"

Salle Moulay Abdellah, Rabat
Referee: Khalid Hnich (Morocco)
Referee: Said El Haoud (Morocco)

24 April 2025
14:00

Angola	3–1	Egypt
Djamila 10'53", 32'55"; Beu 38'22"	Report	Asmaaooz 31'41"

Salle Moulay Abdellah, Rabat
Referee: Said El Haoud (Morocco)
Referee: Ndubuisi Ukah (Nigeria)

26 April 2025
14:00

Egypt	3–3	Guinea
Sherouk I. 1'49"; Yara S. 10'44" (pen.); Asmaaooz 21'21"	Report (CAF)	Sidibé 3'52"; Camara 9'22", 36'27"

Salle Moulay Abdellah, Rabat
Referee: Khalid Hnich (Morocco)
Referee: Warda Chanai (Algeria)

=== Group C ===
Pos	Team	Pld	W	D	L	GF	GA	GD	Pts	Qualification
1	Tanzania	2	1	1	0	7	5	+2	4	Semi-finals
2	Madagascar	2	0	2	0	9	9	0	2	Fifth place game
3	Senegal	2	0	1	1	6	8	−2	1	Seventh place game

Source: CAF
Rules for classification: 1) Points; 2) head-to-head matches; 3) Goal difference; 4) Number of goals scored.
22 April 2025
17:00

Madagascar	5–5	Senegal
Mbolaniana 10'11", 22'55"; Raheritiana 18'24"; Rasamison 35'03"; Raveloarisoa 35'40"	Report (FSF)	Mendy 12'39"; Kalamo 17'10"; Tall 27'09", 36'55" (pen.); Faty 31'37"

Salle Moulay Abdellah, Rabat
Referee: Ahmed Gamal (Egypt)
Referee: Ahmed Hamdi (Egypt)

24 April 2025
17:00

Madagascar	4–4	Tanzania
Raveloarisoa 1'03", 26'39", 30'25"; Mbolaniana 30'50"	Report	Minja 15'54", 27'10"; Mnunka 23'15"; Athumani 30'08"

Salle Moulay Abdellah, Rabat
Referee: José Katchingavisa (Angola)
Referee: Malika Chihaoui (Algeria)

26 April 2025
17:00

Tanzania	3–1	Senegal
Minja 13'30"; Mwamakamba 20'42"; Katunzi 21'05"	Report (CAF)	Kané 29'42"

Salle Moulay Abdellah, Rabat
Referee: Ali Al-Ayat (Libya)
Referee: Sipho Mahlangu (South Africa)

=== Ranking of Second-placed teams ===
Pos	Grp	Team	Pld	W	D	L	GF	GA	GD	Pts	Qualification
1	A	Cameroon	2	1	0	1	7	12	−5	3	Semi-finals
2	C	Madagascar	2	0	2	0	9	9	0	2	Fifth place game
3	B	Egypt	2	0	1	1	4	6	−2	1	Fifth place game

Source: CAF
Rules for classification: 1) Points; 2) head-to-head matches; 3) Goal difference; 4) Number of goals scored.

=== Ranking of third-placed teams ===
Pos	Grp	Team	Pld	W	D	L	GF	GA	GD	Pts	Qualification
1	C	Senegal	2	0	1	1	6	8	−2	1	Seventh place game
2	B	Guinea	2	0	1	1	5	8	−3	1	Seventh place game
3	A	Namibia	2	0	0	2	6	14	−8	0	

Source: CAF
Rules for classification: 1) Points; 2) head-to-head matches; 3) Goal difference; 4) Number of goals scored.

== Knockout stage ==
In the knockout stage, extra time and penalty shoot-out are used to decide the winner if necessary.

=== Bracket ===
Semi-finals
28 April
Tanzania	3
Cameroon	2
28 April
Angola	1
Morocco	5

Final
30 April
Tanzania	2
Morocco	3
Third place game
30 April
Cameroon	4
Angola	1

Seventh place game
29 April
Senegal	8
Guinea	1

Fifth place game
29 April
Madagascar	2
Egypt	4

=== Seventh place game ===
29 April 2025
17:00

Senegal	8–1	Guinea
Tall 3'49"; Sy 8'16"; Faty 12'14", 27'36"; Diadhiou 20'45"; Diedhiou 21'47", 34'57"; Dramé 22'36" (o.g.)		A. Soumah 34'41"

Salle Moulay Abdellah, Rabat
Referee: José Katchingavisa (Angola)
Referee: Ibrahima Konaté (Cameroon)

=== Fifth place game ===
29 April 2025
20:00

Madagascar	2–4	Egypt
Razafimanantsoa 1'36"; Mbolaniana 3'13"		Malak A. 10'50", 38'30"; Sherouk I. 28'13"; Samara 30'30"

Salle Moulay Abdellah, Rabat
Referee: Kouassi Tehia (Ivory Coast)
Referee: Malika Chihaoui (Algeria)

=== Semi-finals ===
Winners will qualify for the 2025 FIFA Futsal Women's World Cup.

28 April 2025
17:00

Tanzania	3–2	Cameroon
Mwamakamba 31'38"; Mnunka 35'58"; Katunzi 38'11"	Report	Pekure 32'56"; Beulou 36'36"

Salle Moulay Abdellah, Rabat
Referee: Ali Al-Ayat (Libya)
Referee: Ahmed Hamdi (Egypt)

28 April 2025
20:00

Angola	1–5	Morocco
Djamila 17'37"	Report	El Madani 12'47", 33'28"; Erroudany 29'35"; Demraoui 32'02"; Hajri 38'26"

Salle Moulay Abdellah, Rabat
Referee: Abdelakram El Hentati (Tunisia)
Referee: Ahmed Gamal (Egypt)

=== Third place game ===
30 April 2025
17:00

Cameroon	4–1	Angola
Elam 27'33", 38'34"; Mbomozomo 37'50"; Beulou 39'03"		Dionisia 36'46"

Salle Moulay Abdellah, Rabat
Referee: Khalid Hnich (Morocco)
Referee: Warda Chanai (Algeria)

=== Final ===
30 April 2025
20:00

Tanzania	2–3	Morocco
Katunzi 3'16"; Mnunduka 15'13"		El Madani 19'55"; Korrych 33'22"; Demraoui 39'49"

Salle Moulay Abdellah, Rabat
Referee: Ali Al-Ayat (Libya)
Referee: José Katchingavisa (Angola)

== Goalscorers ==
There were 103 goals scored in 15 matches, for an average of 6.87 goals per match.

5 goals

- (Morocco) Doha El Madani

4 goals

- (Angola) Djamila Catombela
- (Cameroon) Brunelle Beulou
- (Cameroon) Brigitte Mbomozomo
- (Madagascar) Franca Mbolaniana
- (Madagascar) Clara Raveloarisoa
- (Morocco) Jasmine Demraoui

3 goals

- (Senegal) Mariama Faty
- (Senegal) Sokhna Tall Pène
- (Tanzania) Anastazia Katunzi
- (Tanzania) Donisia Minja

2 goals

- (Angola) Joyce Víctor
- (Cameroon) Natacha Elam
- (Egypt) Asmaa Aly
- (Egypt) Malak Amr
- (Egypt) Sherouk Ibrahim
- (Guinea) Mamet Camara
- (Morocco) Amal El Aoufi
- (Morocco) Meryem Hajri
- (Morocco) Drissia Korrych
- (Morocco) Siham Tadlaoui
- (Morocco) Malak Zaid AlKilani
- (Namibia) Muhinatjo Hanavi
- (Senegal) Mariama Diedhiou
- (Tanzania) Aisha Mnunka
- (Tanzania) Vioeth Mwamakamba

1 goal

- (Angola) Beu
- (Angola) Dionísia Jungo
- (Angola) Lurdinha
- (Cameroon) Daniella Happi
- (Cameroon) Balkissou Pekure
- (Cameroon) Aurore Tsimi
- (Egypt) Nada Moamen
- (Egypt) Yara Sabry
- (Guinea) Aminata Bangoura
- (Guinea) Saran Sidibé
- (Guinea) Aminata Soumah
- (Guinea) Bountouraby Soumah
- (Madagascar) Tantely Raheritiana
- (Madagascar) Andoniana Rasamison
- (Madagascar) Faridah Razafimanantsoa
- (Morocco) Zineb Erroudany
- (Morocco) Soumia Hady
- (Morocco) Chirine Knaidil
- (Namibia) Mbitjitandjambi Mungunda
- (Namibia) Memory Ngonda
- (Namibia) Fiola Vliete
- (Senegal) Aissatou Diadhiou
- (Senegal) Juliette Kalamo
- (Senegal) Ndeye Ndiaye Kané
- (Senegal) Ndeyesha Mendy
- (Senegal) Sadio Sy
- (Tanzania) Stumai Athumani
- (Tanzania) Jamila Mnunduka

1 own goal

- (Guinea) Aminata Bangoura (against Angola)
- (Guinea) Rouguiatou Dramé (against Senegal)

2 own goals

- (Cameroon) Brigitte Mbomozomo (against Morocco, Namibia)

== Final ranking and awards ==
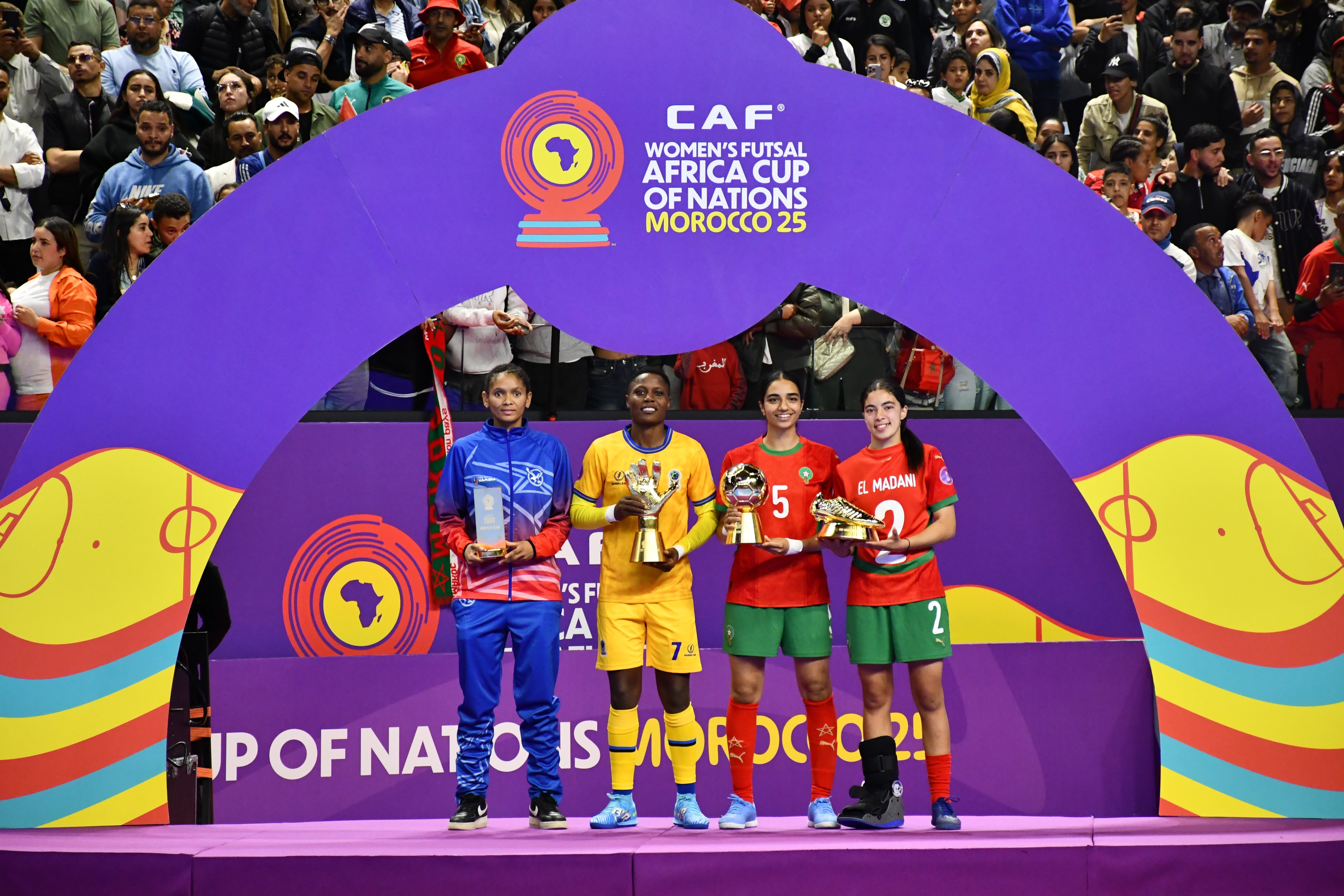
Awarded players in the tournament.

=== Final ranking ===
Pos.	Team	Pld	W	D	L	Pts	GF	GA	GD
1	Morocco	4	4	0	0	12	23	5	+18
2	Tanzania	4	2	1	1	7	12	10	+2
3	Cameroon	4	2	0	2	6	13	16	−3
4	Angola	4	2	0	2	6	10	12	−2
5	Egypt	3	1	1	1	4	8	8	0
6	Madagascar	3	0	2	1	2	11	13	−2
7	Senegal	3	1	1	1	4	14	9	+5
8	Guinea	3	0	1	2	1	6	16	−10
9	Namibia	2	0	0	2	0	6	14	−8

=== Individual awards ===
The following awards were given after the conclusion of the tournament:

Award	Winner(s)
Best player	(Morocco) Jasmine Demraoui
Top scorer	(Morocco) Doha El Madani
Best goalkeeper	(Tanzania) Najiati Idrisa
Fair play	Namibia

== Qualified teams for the 2025 FIFA Futsal Women's World Cup ==
The following two teams from CAF qualified for the 2025 FIFA Futsal Women's World Cup.

Team	Qualified on
Tanzania	28 April 2025
Morocco	28 April 2025
