= Cameroon women's national futsal team =

Cameroon
- Nickname(s): Les Lionnes Indomptables (The Indomitable Lionesses)
- Association: Cameroonian Football Federation
- Confederation: CAF (Africa)
- Head coach: Louis René Epée
- Captain: Brigitte Mbomozomo
- FIFA code: CMR
- FIFA ranking: 84 ▼1 (8 May 2026)
Home colours	Away colours

First international
- Morocco 7–1 Cameroon (Rabat, Morocco; 24 April 2025)

Biggest win
- Cameroon 4–1 Angola (Rabat, Morocco; 30 April 2025)

Biggest defeat
- Morocco 7–1 Cameroon (Rabat, Morocco; 24 April 2025)

Women's Futsal Africa Cup of Nations
- Appearances: 1 (First in 2025)
- Best result: Third place (2025)

The Cameroon women's national futsal team (French: Équipe nationale féminine de futsal du Cameroun) represents Cameroon in international futsal competitions and is controlled by the Cameroonian Football Federation.

== History ==
=== Background and Early Years ===
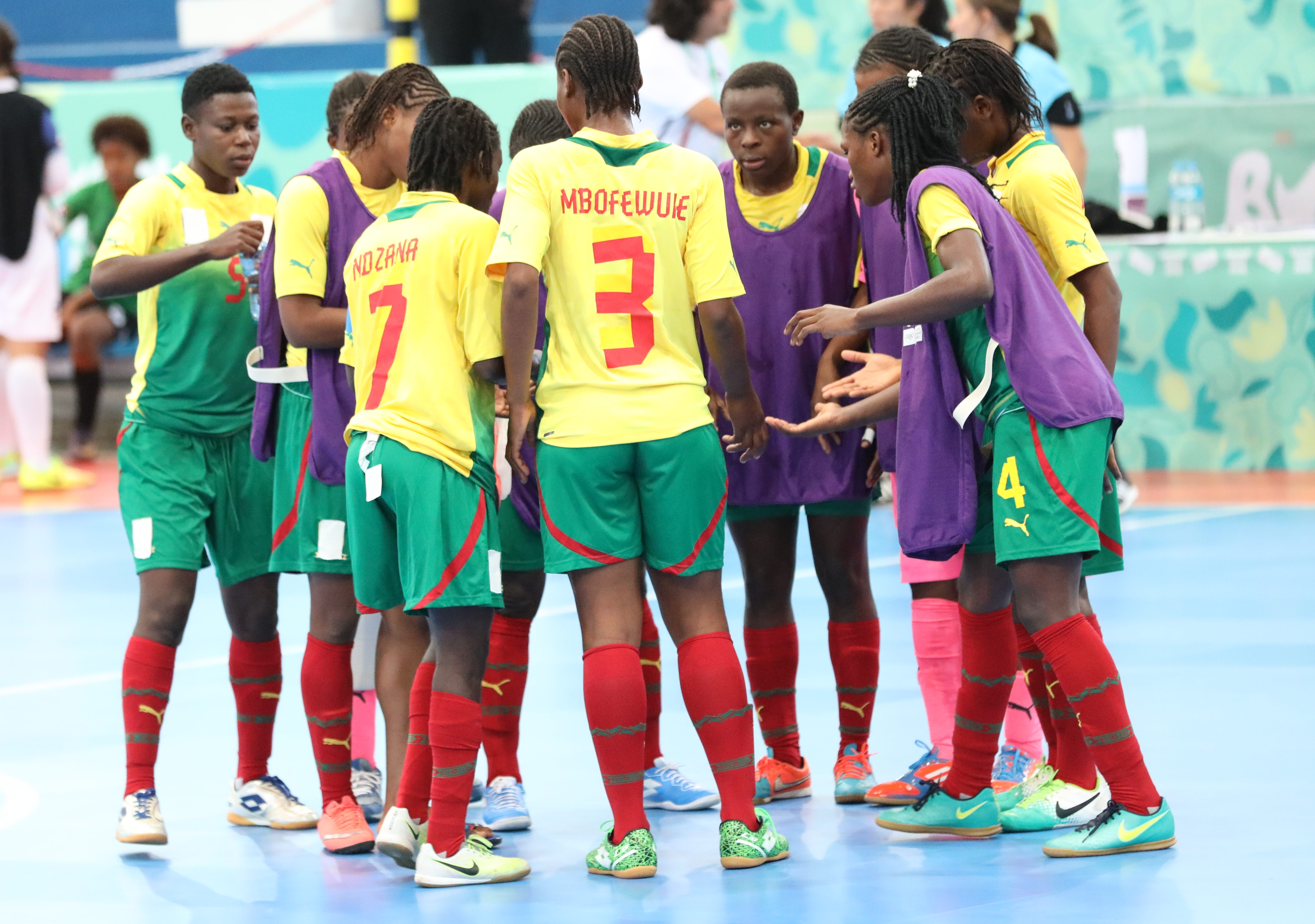
Cameroon Under-18 national team at the 2018 Summer Youth Games

Because there were few to no official international competitions, few countries around the world had established women's futsal teams. At the 2018 Summer Youth Olympics, the first edition to feature futsal, Cameroon qualified for the women's tournament after Nigeria, initially qualified, declined to participate. As a result, Cameroon, being the next highest-ranked side, earned the spot. This led to the creation of the nation's first Under-18 women's futsal team, marking the first U-18 side and only the second senior women's futsal team on the African continent. During the tournament, Cameroon recorded two wins and two losses, finishing third in their group and sixth overall.

Nearly seven years later, with the establishment of the FIFA Futsal Women's World Cup and subsequently the Women's Futsal Africa Cup of Nations, Cameroon formed its senior women's futsal team, once again under the leadership of Louis Epée, who had previously coached the Youth Olympic squad. The team entered the inaugural edition of the 2025 Women's Futsal Africa Cup of Nations in Rabat, Morocco. Cameroon made its international debut on 24 April, suffering a 1–7 defeat to the host nation, but rebounded two days later with a 6–5 victory over Namibia to secure a place in the semifinals.

== Players ==
=== Current squad ===
The following 14 players have been selected for the 2025 Women's Futsal Africa Cup of Nations, from 22 to 30 April 2025.

No.	Pos.	Player	Date of birth (age)	Club
1	GK	Caliste Ngah	1 March 2006 (age 20)	(Cameroonian Football Federation) AS FAP
2	GK	Dafna Tchiwu	5 August 2006 (age 20)	(Cameroonian Football Federation) Authentic Ladies
3	MF	Miranda Kuemene	19 February 2002 (age 24)	(Cameroonian Football Federation) AS Menoua
4	DF	Natacha Elam	5 December 2001 (age 24)	(Cameroonian Football Federation) FC Ebolowa
5	FW	Ashley Ndifone	1 January 2007 (age 19)	(Cameroonian Football Federation)
6	MF	Marie Princesse Ngon	28 December 2007 (age 18)	(Cameroonian Football Federation) Cyclone FF
7	FW	Brunelle Beulou	30 May 2001 (age 25)	(Cameroonian Football Federation) FC Ebolowa
8	MF	Brigitte Mbomozomo	3 October 2002 (age 23)	(Cameroonian Football Federation) AS FAP
9	DF	Balkissou Pekure	1 January 2008 (age 18)	(Cameroonian Football Federation) Petrichor FA
10	MF	Saint Esprit Sah Ndaowa	17 February 2008 (age 18)	(Cameroonian Football Federation) Bembale
11	MF	Aurore Tsimi	25 December 2007 (age 18)	(Cameroonian Football Federation) Louves Minproff
12	MF	Daniella Happi	10 September 2006 (age 19)	(Cameroonian Football Federation) Eclair FC
13	DF	Nadine Tendiangku	21 December 2006 (age 19)	(Cameroonian Football Federation) Authentic Ladies
14	DF	Ange Massontie	28 August 2005 (age 21)	(Cameroonian Football Federation) AS FAP

== Competitive record ==
=== FIFA Futsal Women's World Cup ===
FIFA Futsal Women's World Cup record
Year	Position	Pld	W	D*	L	GF	GA
(Philippines) 2025	Did not qualify						
Total	0/1	—	—	—	—	—	—

*Draws include knockout matches decided on penalty kicks.

=== CAF Women's Futsal Africa Cup of Nations ===
Women's Futsal Africa Cup of Nations record
Year	Position	Pld	W	D*	L	GF	GA	GD
(Morocco) 2025	Third place	4	2	0	2	13	16	–3
Total	1/1	4	2	0	2	13	16	–3

*Draws include knockout matches decided on penalty kicks.

== See also ==
- Cameroon women's national football team
