= Janeth Pangamwene =

Tanzanian footballer

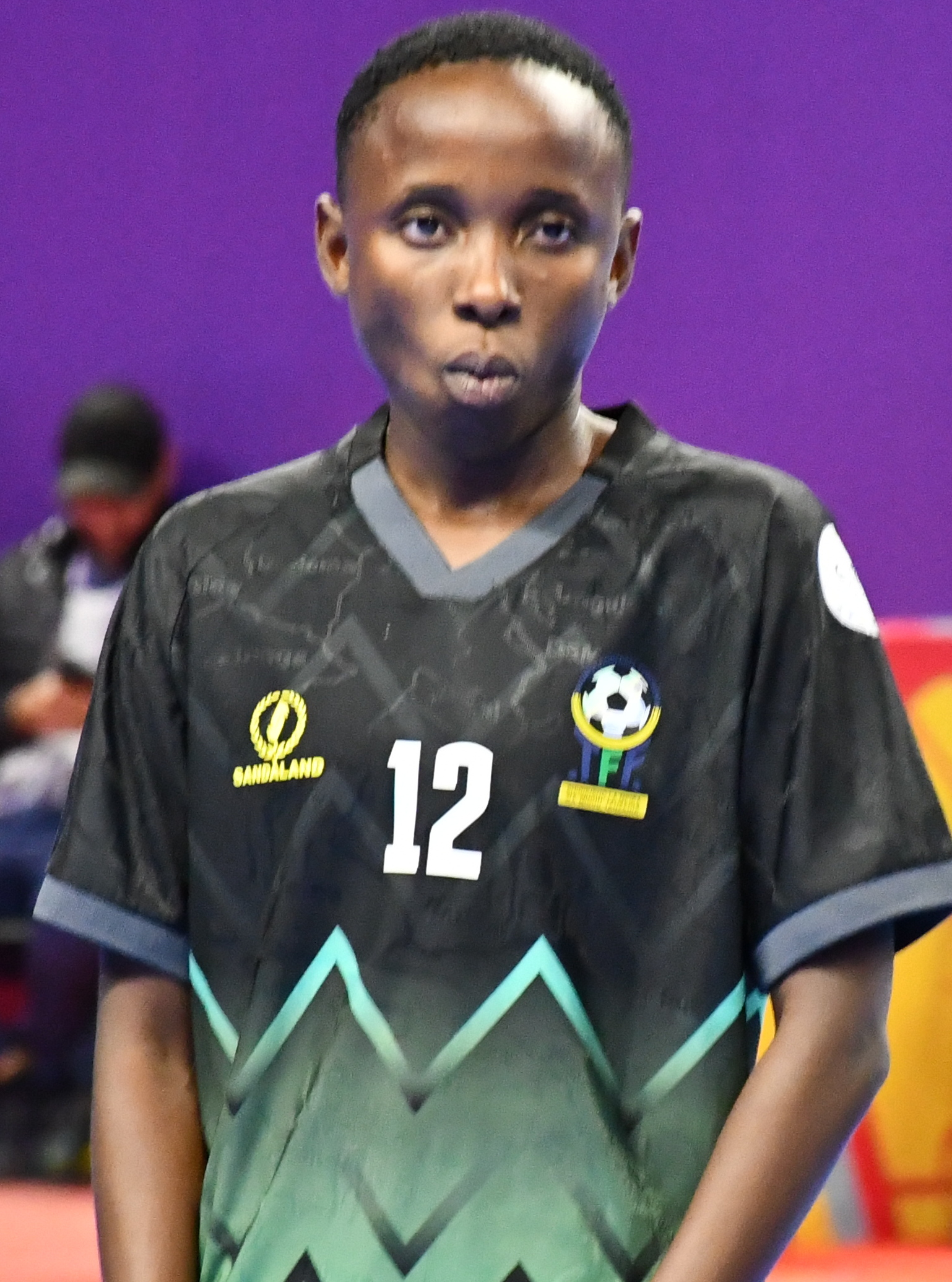
- Janeth during 2025 WAFCON Futsal.

Personal information
- Full name: Janeth Christopher Pangamwene
- Date of birth: 27 November 2000 (age 25)
- Position: Midfielder

Team information
- Current team: JKT Queens

Senior career*
Years	Team	Apps	(Gls)
- JKT Queens

International career
- Tanzania futsal
- * Club domestic league appearances and goals

Janeth Christopher Pangamwene (born 27 November 2000) is a Tanzanian professional footballer who plays as a midfielder for Mlandizi Queens and the Tanzania women's national team.

== International career ==
In 2019, Pangamwene earned a call up to the Tanzania women's under-20 team for the inaugural 2019 COSAFA U-20 Women's Championship. At the end of the competition they emerged champions after defeating Zambia by 2–1 in the final. She was subsequent promoted to the senior side and was named in the squad for 2020 COSAFA Women's Championship. The following year, she was named in the 2021 COSAFA Women's Championship squad list. She played four matches during the competition as Tanzania emerged champions for the first time in history.

== Honours ==
- COSAFA U-20 Women's Championship: 2019
- COSAFA Women's Championship: 2021
