= Madagascar women's national futsal team =

Madagascar
- Nickname(s): Barea Ladies
- Association: Malagasy Football Federation
- Confederation: CAF (Africa)
- Head coach: Steeve Princy Manitriniaina
- FIFA code: MAD
- FIFA ranking: 87 (24 September 2026)
Home colours	Away colours

First international
- Madagascar 5–5 Senegal (Rabat, Morocco; 22 April 2025)

Biggest defeat
- Madagascar 2–4 Egypt (Rabat, Morocco; 29 April 2025)

Women's Futsal Africa Cup of Nations
- Appearances: 1 (First in 2025)
- Best result: Sixth place (2025)

The Madagascar women's national futsal team (Malagasy: Ekipa nasionalin’i Madagasikara amin'ny futsal vehivavy; French: Équipe nationale féminine de futsal de Madagascar) represents Madagascar in international futsal competitions and is controlled by the Malagasy Football Federation.

== History ==
Given the limited competitiveness of the Madagascar women's football team, the Malagasy Football Federation saw an opportunity to invest in women's futsal. Following the launch of the Women's Futsal Africa Cup of Nations in 2024, which would serves as the qualification pathway to the newly established FIFA Futsal Women's World Cup. the federation initiated the development of a women's futsal program. With few established teams across Africa, Madagascar aims to position itself as a competitive force in the emerging discipline. On 22 April 2025, Les Barea Ladies made their debut in the tournament, playing out a thrilling 5–5 draw against Senegal. Following another 4–4 draw against Tanzania, Madagascar failed to advance to the semifinals and instead competed in the 5th place playoff. In which they suffered their first defeat losing 2–4 to Egypt, ultimately finishing the competition in sixth place.

== Results and fixtures ==
- The following is a list of match results in the last 12 months, as well as any future matches that have been scheduled.

Legend

Win Draw Lose Fixture

== Players ==
=== Current squad ===
The following 14 players were called up for the 2025 Women's Futsal Africa Cup of Nations from 22 to 30 April 2025.

No.	Pos.	Player	Date of birth (age)	Club
1	GK	Anastasie Soanarivo	5 February 2005 (age 21)	(Malagasy Football Federation) ASCUF
2	DF	Jessica Andriainirinaiana	3 January 2010 (age 16)	(Malagasy Football Federation) Disciples FC
3	MF	Farella Ravelomanana	17 December 2003 (age 22)	(Malagasy Football Federation) ASCUF
4	DF	Tantely Raheritiana	26 January 2008 (age 18)	(Malagasy Football Federation) ASKAM AFA
5	FW	Andoniana Rasamison	31 January 1999 (age 27)	(Comoros Football Federation) Etoile du Centre
6	MF	Marie Clara Raveloarisoa	3 August 2003 (age 23)	(Malagasy Football Federation) AJSM
7	DF	Faridah Razafimanantsoa	2 July 1997 (age 29)	(Malagasy Football Federation) AJSM
8	MF	Jenny Randriamialimanantsoa	25 May 2006 (age 20)	(Malagasy Football Federation) ASKAM AFA
9	MF	Iriko Rakotoarimanana	13 July 2007 (age 19)	(Malagasy Football Federation) Disciples FC
10	MF	Tsilavina Rondromalala	15 April 2004 (age 22)	(Malagasy Football Federation) Disciples FC
11	MF	Franca Mbolaniana	17 April 2002 (age 24)	(Malagasy Football Federation) Disciples FC
12	DF	Emilienne Solange	8 May 1993 (age 33)	(Malagasy Football Federation) ASCUF
13	MF	Larissa Razafindramanana	12 October 1995 (age 31)	(Malagasy Football Federation) Disciples FC
14	GK	Chrystina Faraniaina	4 November 2003 (age 22)	(Malagasy Football Federation) Disciples FC

== Competitive record ==
=== FIFA Futsal Women's World Cup ===
FIFA Futsal Women's World Cup record
Year	Result	Pld	W	D*	L	GF	GA	GD
(Philippines) 2025	Did not qualify							
Total	0/1	—	—	—	—	—	—	—

*Draws include knockout matches decided on penalty kicks.

=== CAF Women's Futsal Africa Cup of Nations ===
Women's Futsal Africa Cup of Nations record
Year	Result	Pld	W	D*	L	GF	GA	GD
(Morocco) 2025	Sixth place	3	0	2	1	11	13	0
Total	1/1	3	0	2	1	11	13	0

*Draws include knockout matches decided on penalty kicks.

== See also ==
- Madagascar women's national football team
