= Chirine Knaidil =

Moroccan footballer

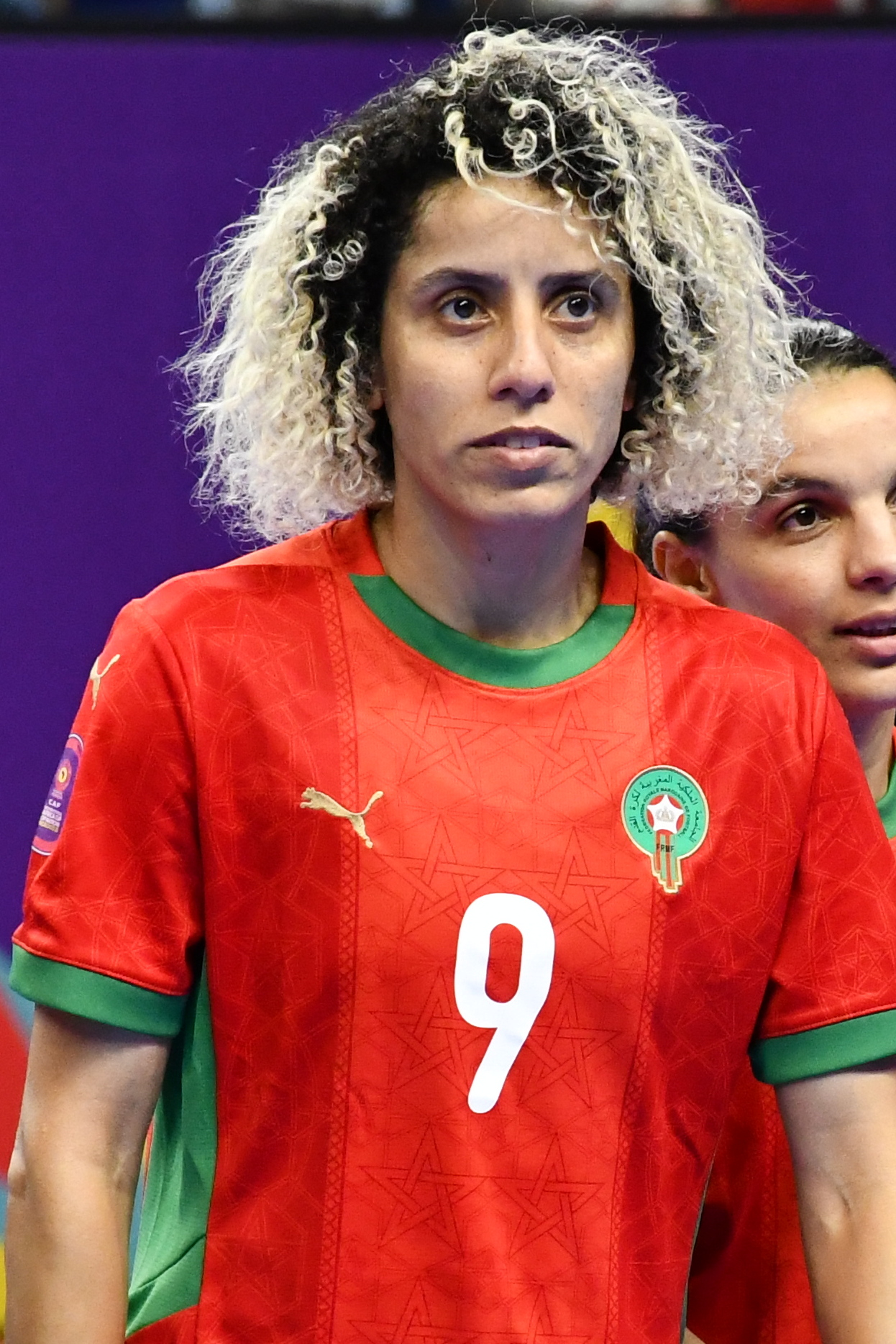
Knaidil during 2025 WAFCON Futsal.

Chirine Knaidil (born 19 February 1994) is a Moroccan footballer who plays as a defender.

Knaidil played in the 2017-18 Turkish Women's First League season for Beşiktaş J.K. appearing in eight matches of the league's second half and scored three goals.

Knaidil was called up to the Morocco women's national under-20 football team for preparation of the 2014 African U-20 Women's World Cup Qualifying Tournament. She scored her team's only goal in the match against Tunisia.

== See also ==
- List of Morocco women's international footballers
