= Irene Gonçalves =

Angolan footballer

Personal information
- Full name: Irene Maria Duarte Gonçalves
- Date of birth: 11 December 1984 (age 41)
- Place of birth: Luanda, Angola
- Height: 1.75 m (5 ft 9 in)
- Position: Forward

Senior career*
Years	Team	Apps	(Gls)
1998-2006	Mabo		
2006-2012	Progresso do Sambizanga	42	(113)

International career
2002-2010	Angola	10	(4)
- * Club domestic league appearances and goals

Irene Maria Duarte Gonçalves (born 11 December 1984) is an Angolan retired footballer who played as a forward. Nicknamed Diva Demolidora (Destroyer Diva) or simply Demolidora (Destroyer), she is the historical top goalscorer of the Angola women's national team, which she has also captained.

== Club career ==
Gonçalves has captained the women's team of Progresso Associação do Sambizanga. During the 2008 Angolan Women's Football League, she scored 22 goals in a single match, which many people consider a world record in women's football, but it is not internationally recognized.

== International career ==
She made her debut on October 11, 2002, at the age of 17, after a teammate was sent off in the first game against the DRC in the final qualifiers. She then scored a penalty, qualifying Angola for the Africa Cup of Nations, where she scored the country's first goal. 2002 African Women's Championship and the 2010 African Women's Championship qualification (preliminary round).

=== International goals ===
Scores and results list Angola's goal tally first

No.	Date	Venue	Opponent	Score	Result	Competition	Ref.
1	8 December 2002	Oghara Township Stadium, Oghara, Nigeria	Zimbabwe	1–0	1–1	2002 African Women's Championship	
2	22 Augost 2006	Lusaka, Zambia	Zimbabwe		1-3	2008 COSAFA Women's Cup	
3	7 March 2010	Sam Nujoma Stadium, Windhoek, Namibia	Namibia	1–0	1-2	2010 African Women's Championship qualification	
4	21 March 2010	Ombaka National Stadium, Benguela, Angola	Namibia	1–0	1–1	2010 African Women's Championship qualification	

== Retirement ==
In March 2012, Gonçalves announced her retirement from football.

== Personal life ==
Gonçalves is a Catholic.
