= Raja Aïn Harrouda =

Women's football club in Ain Harrouda

- Full name: Club Raja Aïn Harrouda de Football Féminin
- Short name: CRAH
- Founded: 2005; 21 years ago
- Ground: Dakhla Aïn Harrouda Sports Complex
- Capacity: 1,000
- President: Ahmed El Taki
- Coach: Hamid Qotbi
- League: Moroccan Women's Championship D1
- 2024–25: D1, 12th of 14 (relegated)
Home colours	Away colours

Club Raja Aïn Harrouda de Football Féminin (Arabic: نادي رجاء عين حرودة لكرة القدم النسوية), commonly known as Raja Aïn Harrouda or as CRAH for short, is a professional women's football club based in Aïn Harrouda that competes in the Moroccan Division 1 Féminine. The top tier of Moroccan women's football hierarchy.

== History ==
The club was founded in 2005 and finished as runners-up in its first season in 2006, narrowly losing to FC Berrechid. Three years later, in 2009, the club achieved its first major success by being crowned champions of Morocco.

In August 2021, Raja Aïn Harrouda earned promotion back to the top tier.

== Players and Staff ==
=== Players ===
As of February 16, 2025

Note: Flags indicate national team as defined under FIFA eligibility rules; some limited exceptions apply. Players may hold more than one non-FIFA nationality.

No.	Pos.	Nation	Player
1	GK	MAR	Karima Hadouchi
2	DF	MAR	Rajae Ammar
3	DF	CHA	Salamatou Tchinsou
4	FW	CHA	Solange Larkingam
6		MAR	Firdawse Chekdani
8	MF	NGR	Amaewhule Ozinuchi
10	FW	GHA	Sarah Inkoom
11		MAR	Rajae El Mazray
13		MAR	Aya Laaroussi
14		MAR	Salma Jroumi
17		MAR	Kaoutar Rich
18		MAR	Asmae Choubabi

No.	Pos.	Nation	Player
19		MAR	Sara Aboulouafa
20		MAR	Yara Khattab
21		MAR	Fatima Zahra Ouchen
22	GK	MAR	Jihane El Fadili
—		MAR	Halla Asbahi
—		MAR	Loubna Harajim
—	FW	MAR	Zineb Bensmia
—		MAR	Nourimane Najih
—	GK	MAR	Laila Jbili
—		MAR	Malak Ghanimi
—		MAR	Ghizlane El Amri

=== Current staff ===
As of 8 January 2025

Coaching staff
Head coach	(Morocco) Hamid Qotbi

== Honours ==
- Moroccan Women's Championship D1: 2008–09
