= Women's Futsal Africa Cup of Nations =

African association football tournament for women's national futsal teams

- Organiser(s): CAF
- Founded: 2025
- Region: Africa
- Teams: Maximum of 54 (Qualifiers); 9 (Finals)
- Current champions: Morocco (1st title)
- Most championships: Morocco (1 title)
- 2025 Futsal Wafcon

The Women's Futsal Africa Cup of Nations, is the main futsal competition of the women's national futsal teams governed by CAF (the Confederation of African Football).

The tournament is held every two years, with the first final tournament will be held in April 2025 and will feature nine teams.

== History ==
On January 27, 2025, the executive committee of the Confederation of African Football formalized the launch of a Women's Futsal Africa Cup of Nations, the first edition of which took place from April 22 to 30, 2025 in Morocco. The two finalists of the tournament will earn their spot to represent Africa at the 2025 FIFA Futsal Women's World Cup.

== Results by edition ==
Year	Host	Final			Third place match		
Year	Host	Winner	Score	Runner-up	Third place	Score	Fourth place
2025; Details	Morocco	Morocco	3–2	Tanzania	Cameroon	4–1	Angola

== Team results ==
Legend

- 1st — Champions
- 2nd — Runners-up
- 3rd — Third place
- 4th — Fourth place
- GS — Group stage
- × — Did not enter / Withdrew / Banned
- Q — Qualified for upcoming tournament
- — Hosts

Team	(Morocco) 2025 (9)	Total
Angola	4th	1
Cameroon	3rd	1
Egypt	5th	1
Guinea	8th	1
Madagascar	6th	1
Morocco	1st	1
Namibia	9th	1
Senegal	7th	1
Tanzania	2nd	1

== Awards ==
Year	Top goalscorer(s)	Gls	Best player	Best goalkeeper	Ref.
(Morocco) 2025	(Morocco) Doha El Madani	5	(Morocco) Jasmin Demraoui	(Tanzania) Najiati Idrisa	

== See also ==
- Futsal Africa Cup of Nations
