= Tanzania women's national futsal team =

Tanzania
- Nickname(s): Twiga Stars
- Association: Tanzania Football Federation
- Confederation: CAF (Africa)
- Head coach: (Jamaica) Curtis Red
- Captain: Fatuma Issa
- Top scorer: Donisia Minja and Anastazia Katunzi (3 goals)
- FIFA code: TAN
- FIFA ranking: 73 (24 September 2026)
Home colours	Away colours

First international
- Madagascar 4–4 Tanzania (Rabat, Morocco; 24 April 2025)

Biggest win
- Tanzania 3–1 Senegal (Rabat, Morocco; 26 April 2025); New Zealand 2–4 Tanzania (Pasig, Philippines; 26 November 2025)

Biggest defeat
- Portugal 10–0 Tanzania (Pasig, Philippines; 23 November 2025)

FIFA Futsal Women's World Cup
- Appearances: 1 (First in 2025)
- Best result: TBD

Women's Futsal Africa Cup of Nations
- Appearances: 1 (First in 2025)
- Best result: Runners-up (2025)

The Tanzania women's national futsal team represents Tanzania in international women's futsal competitions and is controlled by the Tanzania Football Federation.

== History ==
With relatively few African countries having established women's futsal teams, the creation of the FIFA Futsal Women's World Cup and the subsequent launch of its African qualifying tournament, the Women's Futsal Africa Cup of Nations, prompted further development. Tanzania, having formed their men's futsal team in 2024, registered for the inaugural edition, becoming the first CECAFA member to establish a women's futsal side.

In April 2025, the East African team participated in their first-ever international tournament, making their debut on 24 April 2025 in a 4–4 draw against Madagascar. Two days later, they recorded their first win against Senegal to advance to the semifinals. In the semifinal, Tanzania maintained their unbeaten record with a win over Cameroon, securing a place in the inaugural final and qualifying for the FIFA Futsal Women's World Cup in the Philippines. In doing so, Tanzania became the first African nation to book their place in the finals.

== Results and fixtures ==
The following is a list of match results in the last 12 months, as well as any future matches that have been scheduled.

Legend

Win Draw Loss Fixtures

== Players ==
=== Current squad ===
The following 14 players were called up for the 2025 Women's Futsal Africa Cup of Nations from 22 to 30 April 2025 in Rabat, Morocco.

No.	Pos.	Player	Date of birth (age)	Club
1	GK	Asha Mrisho	10 February 2004 (age 22)	(Tanzania Football Federation) Mashujaa Queens
2	DF	Anastazia Katunzi	29 January 1996 (age 30)	(Tanzania Football Federation) JKT Queens
3	MF	Jamila Mnunduka	10 November 2007 (age 19)	(Tanzania Football Federation) JKT Queens
4	MF	Vioeth Mwamakamba	9 February 2005 (age 21)	(Tanzania Football Federation) Simba Queens
5	DF	Fatuma Issa	6 April 1995 (age 31)	(Tanzania Football Federation) Simba Queens
6	DF	Donisia Minja	9 August 1996 (age 30)	(Tanzania Football Federation) JKT Queens
7	GK	Najiati Idrisa	2 April 1997 (age 29)	(Tanzania Football Federation) JKT Queens
8	FW	Stumai Athuman	25 August 1997 (age 29)	(Tanzania Football Federation) JKT Queens
9	MF	Janeth Nyangali	13 February 2006 (age 20)	(Tanzania Football Federation)
10	MF	Aisha Mnunka	26 July 2005 (age 21)	(Tanzania Football Federation) Simba Queens
11	MF	Elizabeth Chenge	25 July 2011 (age 15)	(Tanzania Football Federation) JKT Queens
12	MF	Janeth Pangamwene	27 November 2000 (age 25)	(Tanzania Football Federation) JKT Queens
13	MF	Zawadi Athuman	20 February 2006 (age 20)	(Tanzania Football Federation) Simba Queens
14	FW	Shelda Mafuru	28 March 1997 (age 29)	(Tanzania Football Federation) Simba Queens

== Competitive record ==
=== FIFA Futsal Women's World Cup ===
FIFA Futsal Women's World Cup record
Year	Result	Pld	W	D*	L	GF	GA
(Philippines) 2025	Group stage	3	1	0	2	4	21
Total	1/1	3	1	0	2	4	21

*Draws include knockout matches decided on penalty kicks.

=== CAF Women's Futsal Africa Cup of Nations ===
Women's Futsal Africa Cup of Nations record
Year	Position	Pld	W	D*	L	GF	GA
(Morocco) 2025	Runners-up	4	2	1	1	12	10
Total	1/1	4	2	1	1	12	10

*Draws include knockout matches decided on penalty kicks.

== See also ==
- Tanzania women's national football team
