= Morocco women's national futsal team =

Morocco
- Nickname(s): The Atlas Lionesses; Arabic: لبؤات الأطلس
- Association: Royal Moroccan Football Federation
- Confederation: CAF (Africa)
- Head coach: Adil Sayeh
- FIFA code: MAR
- FIFA ranking: 26 ▼2 (24 September 2026)
- Highest FIFA ranking: 47 (April 2025)
- Lowest FIFA ranking: 65 (October 2024)
Home colours	Away colours

First international
- Bahrain 0–3 Morocco (Manama, Bahrain; 2 March 2022)

Biggest win
- Morocco 13–0 Senegal (Rabat, Morocco; 25 March 2025)

Biggest defeat
- Spain 10–1 Morocco (Las Rozas de Madrid, Spain; 10 September 2024)

FIFA Futsal Women's World Cup
- Appearances: 1 (First in 2025)
- Best result: Quarter-finals (2025)

Women's Futsal Africa Cup of Nations
- Appearances: 1 (First in 2025)
- Best result: Champions (2025)

The Morocco women's national futsal team (Arabic: المنتخب الوطني المغربي النسوي لكرة القدم داخل القاعة, French: équipe du Maroc féminine de futsal) represents Morocco in international women's futsal, and is governed by the Royal Moroccan Football Federation (FRMF).

== History ==
=== Debut ===
In 2021, the Royal Moroccan Football Federation launched its women's futsal team, holding its first training camp in April of the same year, as part of the federation's efforts to promote futsal and women's football in the kingdom.

A year later, coached by Hassan Rhouila, the team played its first international matches against Bahrain in Manama in March 2022, winning both games. In July 2022, the team played its first home matches against one of Asia's futsal powerhouses, Thailand in a doubleheader, suffering defeats in both games.

In September 2023, the federation parted ways with coach Rhouila to make way for the appointment of Spanish coach Sara Merino Ojeda.

With the FIFA Women's Futsal World Cup on the horizon, the Moroccan Lionesses faced Argentina in March 2024 in Salé to prepare for the qualifiers, but were defeated in both matches. Two months later, Merino was dismissed by the federation. and Adil Sayeh took over as coach.

In July 2024, the team took part in its first international tournament in Poreč, Croatia, alongside top European sides and Greenland in the Futsal Week June Cup. After finishing last in Group B, the team bounced back with a dominant 11–4 victory over Greenland to secure 5th place marking their biggest win to date. Two months later, Morocco traveled to South America to compete in the Four Nations Tournament in Xanxerê, Brazil, where they finished in last place.

In the 2025 Women's Futsal Africa Cup of Nations, Morocco qualified to the knockout stages after finishing top in the group stage with 6 points following a 8-1 win against Namibia and 7-1 win against Cameroon. In the Semi-final, Morocco defeated Angola 5-1, thus qualifying to the 2025 FIFA Futsal Women's World Cup.

Morocco reached the quarterfinals in the inaugural FIFA Futsal Women's World Cup in the Philippines.

== Results and fixtures ==
The following is a list of match results in the last 12 months, as well as any future matches that have been scheduled.

- results FRMF.ma

Legend

Win Draw Loss Fixtures

=== 2025 ===
21 November 2025 FIFA Futsal Women's World Cup	Morocco	0–6	Argentina	PhilSports Arena, Pasig
18:00		Report	Ontiveros 14'56"; Chiesa 15'36"; Romero 16'47"; Natta 17'30"; Villalba 20'39"; Dupuy 28'48"	Attendance: 1,378; Referee: Martina Piccolo (Italy)

24 November 2025 FIFA Futsal Women's World Cup	Philippines	2–3	Morocco	Pasig, Philippines
20:30 UTC+8	Tolentin 3'53"; Graversen 7'1"	Report	Laftah 9'47"; Tadlaoui 13'55"; Demraoui 16'56"	Stadium: PhilSports Arena; Attendance: 1,771; Referee: Alice Vevodova (Czech Republic)

27 November 2025 FIFA Futsal Women's World Cup	Poland	0–1	Morocco	PhilSports Arena, Pasig
18:00		Report	Demraoui 28'13"	Attendance: 1,125; Referee: Valeria Palma (Chile)

== Staff ==
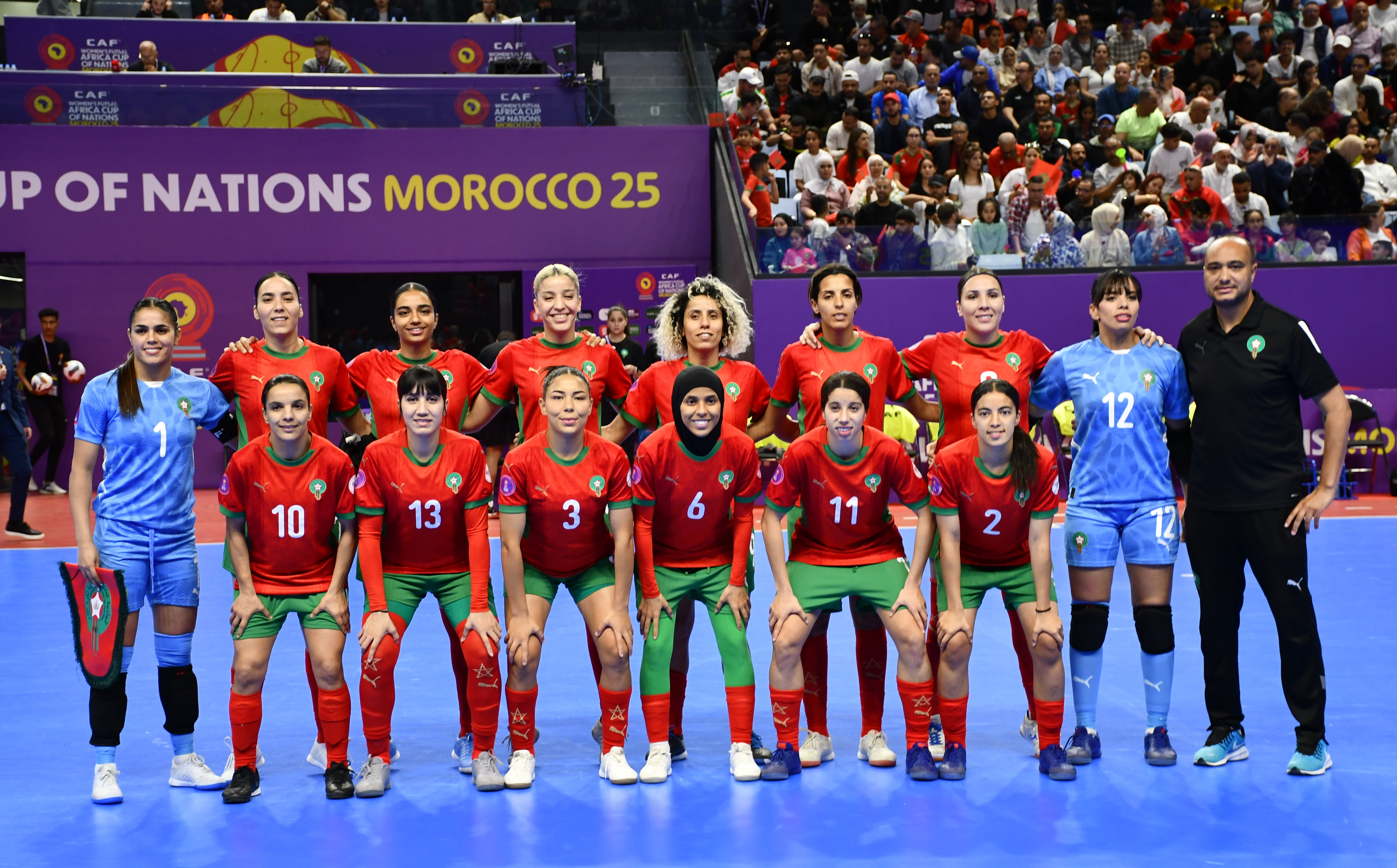
Morocco women's national futsal team during WAFCON Futsal 2025.

=== Coaching staff ===
As of 20 December 2024

Role	Name	Start date	Ref.
Head coach	(Morocco) Adil Sayeh	4 May 2024	

- Staff (2026), FRMF.ma

=== Head coach history ===
As of 5 April 2025

Name	Years	Matches	Won	Drawn	Lost	Win %
(Morocco) Hassan Rhouila	2021–2023	4	2	0	2	50%
(Spain) Sara Merino Ojeda	2023–2024	2	0	0	2	0%
(Morocco) Adil Sayeh	2024–	25	11	0	14	44%

== Players ==
=== Current squad ===
The following 18 players were called up for the friendly matches against Finland from 7 to 16 January 2025.

No.	Pos.	Player	Date of birth (age)	Club
1	GK	Kawtar Bentaleb		(Royal Moroccan Football Federation) FUS Rabat
12	GK	Chaimae Aasem		(Royal Moroccan Football Federation) Wydad AC
22	GK	Malak Fakhir		(Royal Moroccan Football Federation) RS Berkane
31	GK	Laila Kaiche		(Royal Moroccan Football Federation) CS Hilal Temara
2	FP	Shaineze Ben Cherki	4 September 1997 (age 29)	(French Football Federation) Sporting Club de Paris
3	FP	Inès Ziat		(French Football Federation) Futsal D'Igny
4	FP	Soumia Hady	30 June 1998 (age 28)	(Royal Moroccan Football Federation) Wydad AC
5	FP	Jasmine Demraoui	21 January 2004 (age 22)	(French Football Federation) Besançon Académie Futsal
6	FP	Kenza Allaoui	2 November 1999 (age 26)	(Albanian Football Federation) KFF Gramshi
7	FP	Chirine Knaidil	19 February 1994 (age 32)	(Royal Moroccan Football Federation) FUS Rabat
8	FP	Salma Miftah	19 January 1997 (age 29)	(Royal Moroccan Football Federation) SC Casablanca
9	FP	Rajae Lazaar		(Royal Moroccan Football Federation) Wydad AC
10	FP	Drissia Korrych		(Royal Moroccan Football Federation) RS Berkane
11	FP	Malak Zaid Alkilani		(Royal Moroccan Football Federation) Wydad AC
13	FP	Nadia Lftah		(Royal Moroccan Football Federation) Wydad AC
14	FP	Amal El Aoufi		(Royal Moroccan Football Federation) CS Hilal Temara
15	FP	Meryem Hajri	14 September 1994 (age 32)	(Royal Moroccan Football Federation) Union Touarga
17	FP	Ouafae Legdem		(Royal Moroccan Football Federation) CS Hilal Temara
18	FP	Anissa Hattab		(French Football Federation) Marcouville City
19	FP	Narjiss Ahamad	6 July 2001 (age 25)	(German Football Association) VfR Warbeyen

=== Recent call-ups ===
Pos.	Player	Date of birth (age)	Caps	Goals	Club	Latest call-up
GK	Laila Jbili				(Morocco) Raja Aïn Harrouda	v. Czechia, 6 December 2024
	Siham Tadlaoui	26 January 1989 (age 37)			(Morocco) Jawharat Najm Larache	v. Czechia, 6 December 2024
	Bonnie-Lou El Bouhati	23 November 1998 (age 27)			(France) Orléans Futsal	v. Czechia, 6 December 2024
	Samia Machkour				(France) AS Roissy Futsal	v. Czechia, 6 December 2024

== Competitive record ==
=== FIFA Futsal Women's World Cup ===
FIFA Futsal World Cup record
Year	Round	Position	Pld	W	D*	L	GF	GA
(Philippines) 2025	Quarter-finals	8th	4	2	0	2	5	14
Total	Quarter-finals	1/1	4	2	0	2	5	14

*Draws include knockout matches decided on penalty kicks.

=== CAF Women's Futsal Africa Cup of Nations ===
Women's Futsal Africa Cup of Nations record
Year	Result	Pld	W	D*	L	GF	GA	GD
(Morocco) 2025	Champions	4	4	0	0	23	5	+18
Total	1/1	4	4	0	0	23	5	+18

== Honours ==
=== Continental ===
- Women's Futsal Africa Cup of Nations
  - Champions: 2025

== See also ==
- Morocco women's national football team
