= Meryem Hajri =

Moroccan footballer (born 1994)

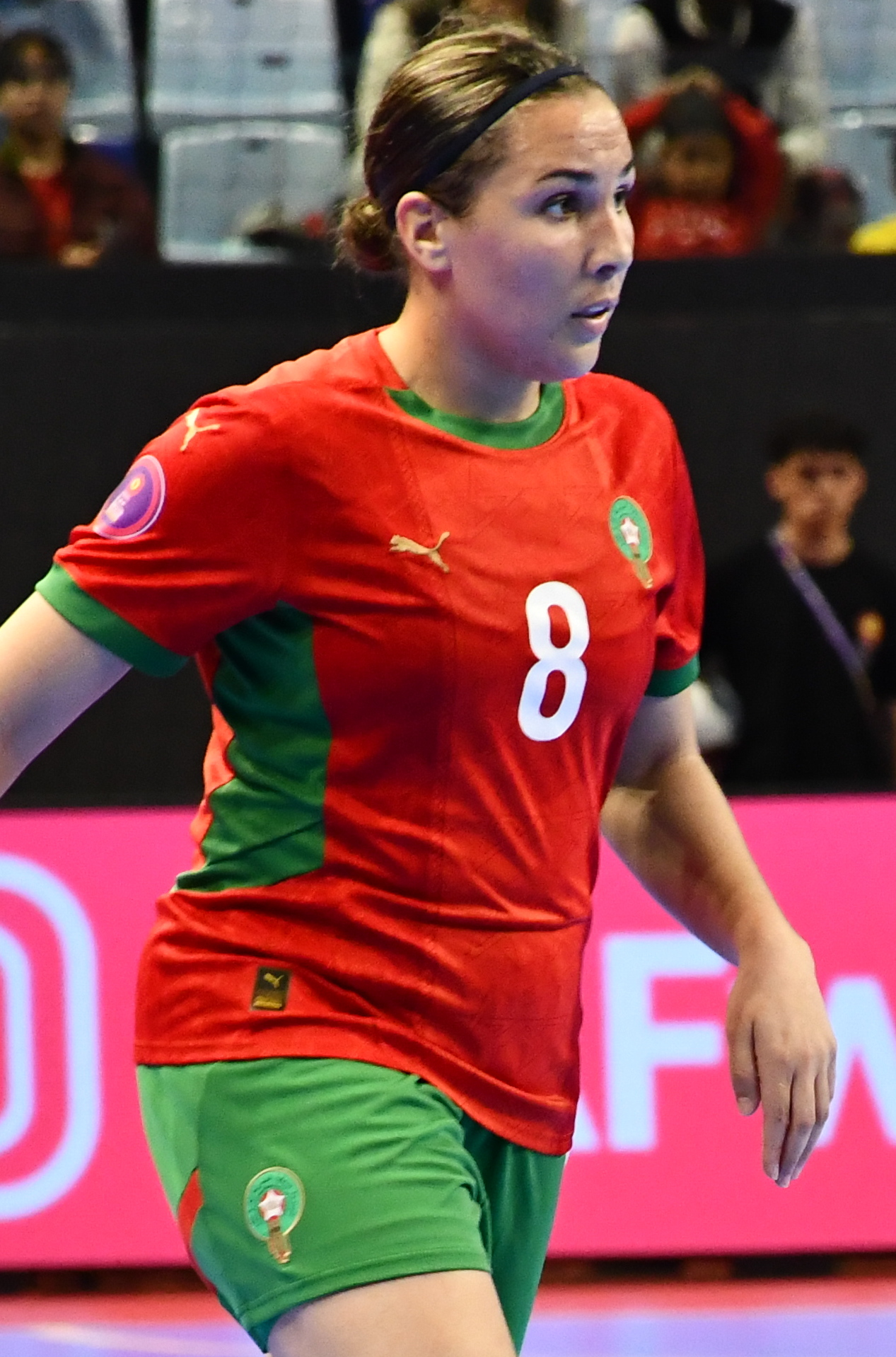
- Hajri during 2025 WAFCON Futsal

Personal information
- Date of birth: 15 September 1994 (age 32)
- Place of birth: Casablanca, Morocco
- Height: 1.65 m (5 ft 5 in)
- Position: Forward

Senior career*
Years	Team	Apps	(Gls)
2014–2017	Wydad		
2018–2019	Sporting Huelva	35	(0)

International career
- Morocco
- * Club domestic league appearances and goals as of 5 May 2019

Meryem Hajri (born 15 September 1994) is a Moroccan footballer and futsal player who plays as a forward for the Morocco national football and futsal teams.

== International career ==
Hajri was capped by Morocco at senior level during the 2018 Africa Women Cup of Nations qualification (first round).

== See also ==
- List of Morocco women's international footballers
