= Mirna Youssef =

Egyptian footballer (born 1996)

Merna Mohsen
Personal information
- Full name: Mirna Mohsen Abdelghany Mohamed Youssef
- Date of birth: 5 February 1996 (age 30)
- Position: Midfielder

Team information
- Current team: Aviation Club

Senior career*
Years	Team	Apps	(Gls)
- Tayaran
- Aviation Club
- Tutankamun

International career^{‡}
2016–	Egypt	3	(0)
- * Club domestic league appearances and goals ‡ National team caps and goals as of 25 November 2016.

Mirna Mohsen Abdelghany Mohamed Youssef (Arabic: ميرنا محسن عبد الغني محمد يوسف; born 5 February 1996), known as Merna Mohsen, is an Egyptian footballer who plays as a midfielder for Tutankhamun and the Egypt women's national team. She has a football academy for young children that she runs with Egypt teammate Mervat Farouk.

== Club career ==
Mohsen has played for Al-Tayaran in Egypt. She currently plays for Tutankhamun. Despite a 6th-place league finish in the 2022–23 season, the team won their first Egyptian Ladies FA Cup after beating Al-Amerya 2–1.

== International career ==
Mohsen was capped for Egypt at senior level during the 2016 Women's Africa Cup of Nations. She played in Egypt's qualifying campaign for the 2022 Women's Africa Cup of Nations. She was called up for training in preparation for qualifying matches ahead of the 2024 Women's Africa Cup of Nations.
