= Water supply and sanitation in Morocco =

Data
- Water coverage (broad definition): 92.2% (2024)
- Sanitation coverage (broad definition): 88% (2024)

Institutions
- Decentralization to municipalities: Yes
- National water and sanitation company: Yes
- Responsibility for policy setting: Ministry of Equipment and Water
- Sector law: Law No. 36-15 on water; Law No. 83-21 on regional multi-service companies
- No. of urban service providers: 12 regional multi-service public companies (SRM); ONEE
- No. of rural service providers: 12 regional multi-service public companies (SRM); ONEE

Water supply and sanitation in Morocco are provided by a combination of national and regional public operators. Service provision has undergone significant reforms in recent years, with the replacement of private concessionaires and municipal utilities by regional multi-service public companies (SRM).

These regional companies are responsible for the distribution of water, electricity and sanitation services at the territorial level. In parallel, the National Office of Electricity and Drinking Water (ONEE) remains a central actor, notably in bulk water production, supply to local operators, and service provision in smaller towns and rural areas.

Access to water supply has improved significantly since the early 2000s, while progress in sanitation has been more gradual. Challenges remain, particularly the limited level of wastewater treatment, the absence of household connections in some low-income urban areas, and the sustainability of certain rural systems.

In response, public authorities have implemented several national programmes. A National Sanitation Programme, launched in 2005, aimed to expand wastewater treatment capacity and improve urban sewerage coverage. Efforts to extend access to water and sanitation services to disadvantaged populations have also been undertaken, notably through the National Human Development Initiative.

== Water resources ==
=== Conventional water resources ===
Morocco has about 22 billion cubic meters of conventional renewable water resources per year equivalent to 730 cubic meter/capita/year. Before taking into account drought years of the 1990s and 2000s total renewable water resources were estimated to be much higher at around 29 billion cubic meters However, only up to 20 billion cubic meter per year can be economically captured (ressources mobilisables), including 16 billion m3 of surface water and 4 billion m3 of groundwater. Morocco has about 100 dams of various sizes with a total storage capacity of 15 billion cubic meter. It was estimated that in 2004 about 13.5 billion m3 were withdrawn, or about 67% of available resources. 83% of withdrawals were for agriculture and 17% for municipal and industrial uses. However, water resources are not divided equally in space and time, with most of the water resources available in the North and rainfall limited to the winter. In addition, the quality of water resources is degraded through pollution, in particular in the Sebou basin.

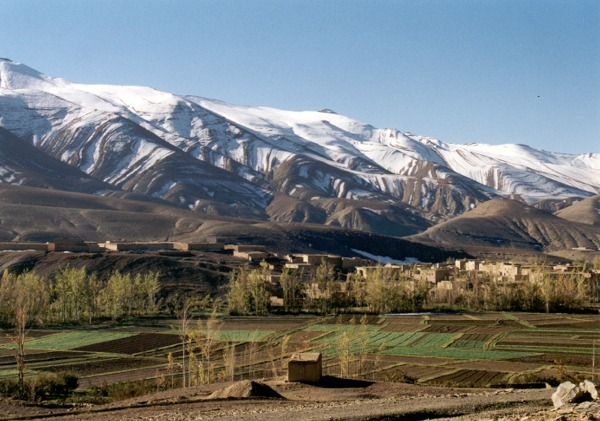
Snowpack in the Atlas Mountains, where most major rivers in Morocco have their source, provides important storage for water resources

Morocco is divided in seven major river basins and a number of smaller basins. The seven major basins from North to South are the Loukkos River, the Moulouya River, the Sebou River, the Bou Regreg River, the Oum Er-Rbia River, the Tensift River and the Souss-Massa-Drâa basin. Except for the Loukkos River, all these rivers originate in the Atlas Mountains.There are few inter-basin transfers in Morocco, the most important ones being the Rocade canal from the Oum Er-Rbia basin to the Tensift basin near Marrakesh, a transfer from near the mouth of the Oum er-Rbia to Casablanca and a transfer from the Bouregreg River also to Casablanca. There are tentative plans for a large north-south water transfer project with an average conveyance capacity of around 2.74 million cubic meter/day (0.75 billion m3/year) over 500–600 km from the Sebou River basin to the water-stressed Tensift basin.

Water use for municipal and industrial uses was about 2.28 billion m3 in 2003, of which 0.7 billion m3 (31%) were from groundwater and 1.58 billion m3 (69%) from surface water. Groundwater resources are overexploited in parts of the country, in particular in the Sous-Massa area in the South where irrigation is the predominant water user.

=== Wastewater treatment and reuse ===
So far there is limited planned reuse of reclaimed water in Morocco, given that only 21% of the collected wastewater undergoes any treatment. In 2009 there were more than 100 wastewater treatment plants in Morocco, mostly serving small and medium-sized towns located in the interior or the country. The first wastewater treatment plants in Morocco were built by small municipalities using a wide range of technologies. Because of the limited financial and technical capacities of those municipalities practically all of these 28 plants ceased functioning shortly after they were completed. This triggered a decision in 2000 to gradually transfer the responsibility for sanitation in small and medium-sized towns to the national utility ONEP. In 2009 the latter has built or was in the process of building 43 plants, mostly using the stabilization pond technology, but also one activated sludge plant and a few trickling filter plants. The track record of operating these plants is better than for the plants operated by municipalities, partly because the predominant technology - stabilization ponds - does not require electricity. Its lower operating costs make it less vulnerable to disruptions in the case of strained operating budgets. In larger cities, only very few municipal utilities (Régies) operate wastewater treatment plants. Their track record at operating them is mixed: A plant operated by the Agadir utility works well, while plants operated by the utilities of Beni Mellal and Nador do not function. These plants use the activated sludge technology which requires electricity. The Marakkesh utility was constructing a large plant in 2009, and the Fez utility was in the process of bidding for a plant. This process experienced a setback when the French development agency AFD and the European Investment Bank withdrew their financing for the plant, citing non-respect of tender procedures as the reason.

Compared to the overall water use in Morocco, reclaimed water can only provide a fraction of the country's increasing water needs. Furthermore, there is no regulatory framework for water reuse and no established system to recover the costs for reclaimed water from users. The country's largest reuse project is currently under construction in Marrakesh, where reclaimed water from a 90,000 m3/day plant will be reused primarily to irrigate golf courses. The tertiary treatment and the network to distribute the reclaimed water will be financed by private investors. Redal, the utility serving Rabat, was carrying out a study in 2009 to assess the feasibility of wastewater reuse to irrigate green spaces in the city. Besides this there have been a few scattered small-scale pilot reuse projects since the 1980s, some of which have been abandoned. Among the sustainable projects is a project to irrigate golf courses in Ben Slimane that has been operating since 1997 with a capacity of 5,600 cubic meter/day. In 2009 a large reuse project was planned in Agadir to irrigate a golf course and municipal gardens with 50,000 cubic meters/day. In 2009 there were also two projects for direct, planned reuse in agriculture in Oujda and Beni Mellal. These projects are financed by the National Environmental Fund and would add a funding to the plants. In 2009 the water department of the State Secretariat for Water and Environment carried out a national study for water reuse.

=== Desalination ===
Morocco is increasingly looking towards seawater desalination as a source to supply its increasing water needs for drinking, industry and mining. The Secrétariat d'État chargé de l'Eau et de l'Environnement has commissioned a study on desalination due to be completed by the end of 2009. Among others, the study foresees a very large new desalination plant in the Casablanca region with a capacity of around 685,000 m3/day (250 million m3/year), or more than 10% of total municipal water use in Morocco.

In May 2014 the national utility ONEE signed a Build-Operate-Transfer contract for a 100,000 m^{3}/day reverse osmosis seawater desalination plant in Agadir with a consortium between the Spanish firm Abengoa Water and the investment fund InfraMaroc. The project had been under preparation for seven years. The payment is in local currency and the Abengoa-led consortium was the only one that submitted a bid for the project that other firms considered to be too risky.

In June 2025, Yabiladi reported that the Casablanca-Settat region was installing 28 modular seawater desalination and demineralization units to address severe water stress. Seventeen were already operational, with total investment reaching 400 million dirhams (272 million from the state, 128 million from the region). The initiative, led by the Regional Multiservice Company, complements larger projects such as the Sebou–Bouregreg water transfer and the planned Casablanca plant, which will eventually cover 80% of the region’s drinking water needs.

== Access ==
In 2011 82% of the population of Morocco had access to an improved water source. Specifically, this means that 59% of Moroccans had access to piped water in their house or in the yard of their house. As of 2004, for 11% the main source of water supply was a public stand pipe, for 5.6% it was a protected well. 1.5% of Moroccans, essentially in rural areas, relied on rainwater harvesting as their principal water source. 7% collected water from springs. Half of these springs, supplying 3.5% of the population, were estimated to be protected. All the above sources are considered as improved water sources by the WHO, thus bringing the total to 82%.

18% of the population did not have access to an improved water source. This share is split up as follows: 1%, both in urban and rural areas, used water from tankers as their main water source. 7% collected water from unprotected public wells and 4% from unprotected private wells inside their home or yard. 2.5% took their water directly from rivers and open reservoirs. Another 3.5% were estimated to use an unprotected spring as their main source of water supply, so that in total 18% of the population lacked access to an improved water source.

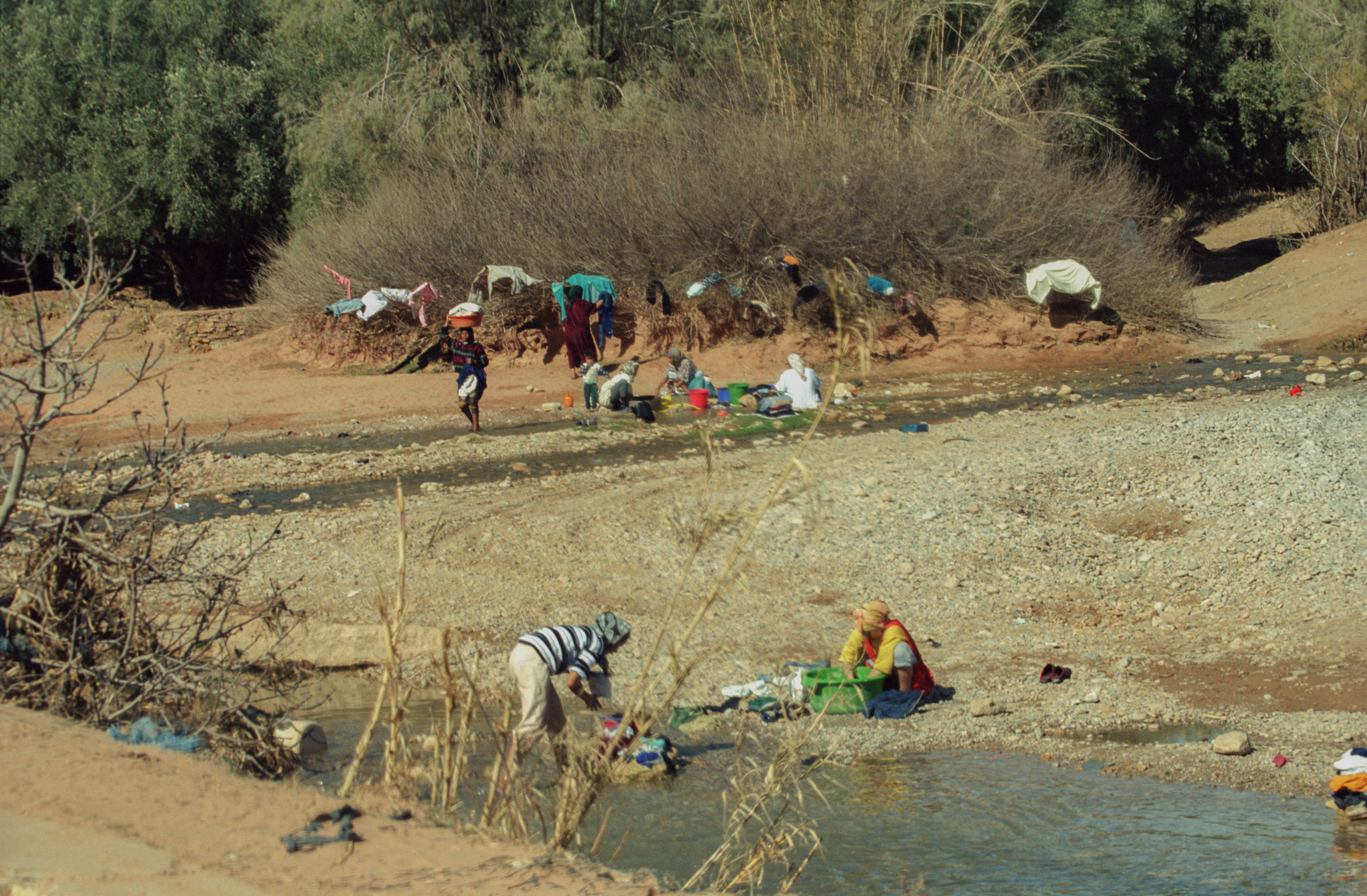
In rural areas women wash clothes, as shown here on the Dades River. With increasing access to tap water and standpipes this practice has become less common

| WATER | Urban | Rural | Total |
|---|---|---|---|
| Tap inside the house | 82.6% | 18.1% | 58.3% |
| Tap in the yard | 2.6% | 1.7% | 2.2% |
| Bottled Water | 0.6% | 0.3% | 0.5% |
| Standpipe | 10.8% | 11% | 10.9% |
| Protected wells | 0.8% | 13.5% | 5.6% |
| Open wells | 1% | 26.6% | 10.7% |
| Spring | 0.9% | 17.2% | 7.1% |
| River or creek | 0.0% | 5.4% | 2.0% |
| Reservoir of a dam | 0.0% | 0.3% | 0.1% |
| Rainwater harvesting | 0.0% | 4.0% | 1.5% |
| Tanker truck | 0.6% | 1.5% | 0.9% |
| Others | 0.1% | 0.4% | 0.2% |
| TOTAL | 100% | 100% | 100% |

Source: Enquête sur la Population et la Santé Familiale (Population and Family Health Survey) 2004.

Concerning sanitation, 83% of the urban population and 52% of the rural population had access to an improved sanitation facility in 2011. 14% of the urban population used shared latrines, which do not count as improved sanitation. 6% of the rural population used shared latrines, and 38% were estimated to defecate in the open. It is the poorest who have no access to sanitation: A 2004 World Bank study noted that "Sewerage service is completely lacking in the peri-urban areas of secondary urban centers. Slums scattered across the bigger metropolitan areas are also deprived of access to the sewerage collection network, reinforcing the health risks and poverty stigma in those neighborhoods."

== Service quality ==
Water supply is continuous in almost all medium and large urban centers. In the city of Layoune, which is served by a seawater desalination plant that has insufficient capacity to supply the entire city, water supply was intermittent in 2010. Only about 21 percent of collected sewage is being treated before being discharged into the environment.

== History and recent developments ==
=== Private service provision during the protectorate ===
During the French Protectorate, beginning in 1912, water supply and sanitation in many large cities in Morocco were managed under a concession to the private company Société Marocaine de Distribution d'eau, de gaz et d'electricité (SMD). SMD, a consortium led by Lyonnaise des Eaux, provided services in Casablanca, Rabat, Salé, Tangier and Meknes. Since 1950 SMD also managed a vital bulk water transfer project: The supply of water from the Oum er-Rbia river to Casablanca. Bulk water supply to other cities that were not able to supply themselves from local water sources was a responsibility of a public company called Régie d'exploitation industrielle du protectorat (REIP) created in the early 1930s. The foundations for two important elements of today's water and sanitation sector - private concessions for water distribution in large cities and a national public company for bulk water supply - were thus already laid during the protectorate.

=== Nationalization after independence ===
After independence in 1956 water distribution systems were nationalized and handed over to public companies in the major cities, the so-called Régies. The bulk water supply system from the Oum Er-Rbia River to Casablanca remained in the hands of the private concessionnaire SMD. Bulk water supply in the rest of the country was entrusted to a new national water company created in 1972, the Office National de l'Eau Potable (ONEP).

=== New water resources management law and rural water program (1995) ===
In 1995 a new, comprehensive Water Law (Loi 10-95) was passed. Aimed at changing the emphasis of water resources management from supply expansion to demand management it was considered a "paradigm shift" at the time. It foresees measures to promote water use efficiency, better allocation of water resources and the protection of water quality through the application of the user pays principle and the Polluter pays principle. The law also provided the legal basis for the establishment of river basin agencies for integrated water resources management, inspired by examples of such agencies in France and Spain, among other countries. In 1996 the Oum Er-Rbia agency was established as the first basin agency in Morocco. In 2000 agencies in the country's other six major basins were created. However, the basin agencies took many years and they still remain relatively weak entities. More than a decade after having been passed the law it is still not fully implemented.

Also in 1995, the government launched an ambitious Rural Water Supply Program (Programme d'approvisionnement groupé en eau potable des populations rurales - PAGER) to face the challenge of very low access to potable water in rural areas. The program is carried out by ONEP, whose responsibility was extended from urban to rural areas through the program (see also below under innovative approaches and international good practice).

=== Water privatization in the late 1990s ===
Since the Régie serving Casablanca had a poor service record the government decided in the mid-1990s to bring in a private company to manage the city's water, sewerage and power networks. A consortium called Lydec, led by Lyonnaise des Eaux (now SUEZ), was awarded the 30-year concession without a competitive tender in 1997. The Casablanca concession paved the way for subsequent concessions in Rabat, Tangier and Tetouan. While the Rabat concession was awarded directly to Vivendi in 1998, the concessions in Tangier and Tetouan were awarded in 2002 after competitive bidding to Amendis, a subsidiary of Vivendi.

In 2000 the initial 50-year concession of SMD, a subsidiary of Lyonnaise, for bulk water supply to Casablanca was renewed.

=== National Sanitation Program ===
In 2000 the ONEP Law was amended to include sanitation (sewerage and wastewater treatment) in ONEP's mandate. At the same time wastewater tariffs (redevance d'assainissement) were first introduced, albeit at a very low level of less than 1 Dirham/m3, and a modest subsidy program was set up. In 2005 this policy was reinforced by the more ambitious National Sanitation Program (Programme National d'Assainissement - PNA).

=== Creation of ONEE through the merger ONEP and ONE ===
During a cabinet reshuffle after elections in 2007 the Ministry of Environment and Water on the one hand, and the Ministry of Energy and Mining on the other hand, were merged into a single "Super Ministry". Within the Ministry a State Secretary remains in charge of water and environment. The Ministry of Environment and Water had been created in 2002, grouping together responsibilities that were previously scattered over several Ministries.

In 2009 the Cabinet approved a bill (Loi 40 09) that foresees a strategic alliance (regroupement) between ONEP and the national electric utility ONE. The objective is to extend economies of scale in billing and maintenance, which are already achieved in the concessions and the Regies in the larger cities, to other areas of the country. The bill is inspired by reform proposals that were put forward in various studies, including one by the management consulting firm McKinsey carried out for the Ministry of Interior in 2004. In September 2011 the bill was approved by Parliament and the new entity, the Office National de l'Electricité et de l'Eau Potable (ONEE), was created. The former ONEP became its "water branch".

== International good practice and innovative approaches ==
Among the various activities in water and sanitation in Morocco initiated over the past two decades, the rural water and sanitation program PAGER has been recognized as international good practice by the United Nations. In addition, an innovative output-based aid project to expand access to water and sanitation has been initiated in 2007.

=== The rural water supply program PAGER ===
In 2004 the national rural water supply program PAGER received the United Nations Public Service Award in the category improvement of public service results. The project relies on two basic principles: the use of simple technologies and the participation of beneficiaries in all stages of the project from the needs assessment to design, implementation and evaluation. The US$1bn program initiated in 1995 aims to reach 12 million people until 2010. The program has relieved women and children from the burden of carrying water. A 2001 World Bank evaluation showed that school enrollment in beneficiary communities increased by 16%.

According to official data and reports by the Moroccan media, PAGER increased access to water in rural areas from 14% in 1995 to 61% in 2004 and 77% in 2006. According to survey data, access to house connections in rural areas increased from 10% in 1995 to 20% in 2004. According to the same survey data access to an improved water source in rural areas remained constant between 1995 and 2004 at 58%. It remains unclear how the survey data and the data of PAGER can be reconciled.

=== Output-Based Aid to expand access to water and sanitation ===
In 2007, the private concessionaires in Casablanca, Tangier and Tetouan, as well as the public water utility of Meknes began to implement water supply and sanitation pilot projects on the basis of an innovative output-based aid approach. The objective is to extend water and sewer connections to 11.300 households in poor, unzoned, periurban neighbourhoods. The pilot projects are part of the National Human Development Initiative and are funded through a US$7 million grant by the Global Partnership for Output-Based Aid (GPOBA) administered by the World Bank. It is the first time that GPOBA, which promotes primarily the private sector, provided grants to a public water operator. The average subsidy level per connection amounts to US$169 for water supply and to US$606 for sanitation. The average subsidy level per connection is 35 percent. Operators also developed awareness raising campaigns to make people aware of the option to connect to sewers through teams that go to market places. Under the output-based aid approach investments are pre-financed by the concessionaires or the public utility that are being reimbursed by GPOBA only after a verification process certifies that the households have been connected and receive an adequate service. According to the World Bank, the output-based aid approach has helped to improve processes, overcome financing obstacles and mobilize stakeholder partnership.

== Sector responsibilities ==
The key actors at the policy level in the sector are the Ministry of Energy, Mining, Water and Environment in charge of water resources management and the Ministry of Interior in charge of water supply and sanitation. At the level of service provision, key actors are the national electric and water utility ONEE, 3 private operators and 13 municipally owned utilities. The country's largest city, Casablanca, is served by the private operator Lydec. In addition to the above institutions, seven basin agencies are in charge of water resources management. These institutions are, however, still relatively weak.

Overall, the sector is characterized by a complex and fragmented institutional framework, which - according to a 2004 World Bank report - "has hindered the formulation of a comprehensive sector-wide vision and the establishment of coherent policy objectives".

=== Policy and regulation ===
The highest political authority in the Moroccan water sector rests with the Higher Council for Water and Climate (Conseil Supérieur de l'Eau et du Climat) under the Prime Minister and the Honorary Presidency of the King. It was created in 1996, replacing an earlier Higher Council created in 1981. It includes representatives of all the Ministries involved in water, representatives of regional governments and water user associations, as well as academics, professional associations and trade associations. Although the council is supposed to meet once a year as per its founding decree, it last met in 2001. Its last previous meeting was held in 1994. According to the same decree the secretariat function for the Council is assured by the Ministry of Public Works. However, all water-related functions were moved from the Ministry of Public Works to the newly created Ministry of Water and Environment in 2002.

Within the government of Morocco responsibilities for water supply and sanitation are shared by various Ministries. The Ministry of Energy, Mining, Water and Environment (Ministère de l'Energie, des mines, de l'eau et de l'environnement) is in charge of water resources management and bulk water supply, while the Ministry of Interior is in charge of supervising water distribution and sanitation carried out by municipal utilities. Within the Ministry of Interior the Direction de l'eau et de l'assainissement (DEA) assists local governments with water and sanitation issues, and plays an active role in planning, implementing, and supporting the operations of basic water and sewerage infrastructure. The Directorate of Public Utilities and Concessions (DRSC), also in the Ministry of the Interior, monitors the performance of Régies and concessions

Certain sector responsibilities are within the realm of other Ministries. The Ministry of Public Health (Ministère de la santé publique, MSP) is the main water quality regulator in the sector, responsible for setting and enforcing public health drinking water standards. The Directorate of Public Corporations and Privatization of the Ministry of Finance oversees the fiscal aspects of public utility operations, and the contracting of concessions. Furthermore, an Interdepartmental Commission on Prices approves proposals for tariff increases.

=== Water resources management ===
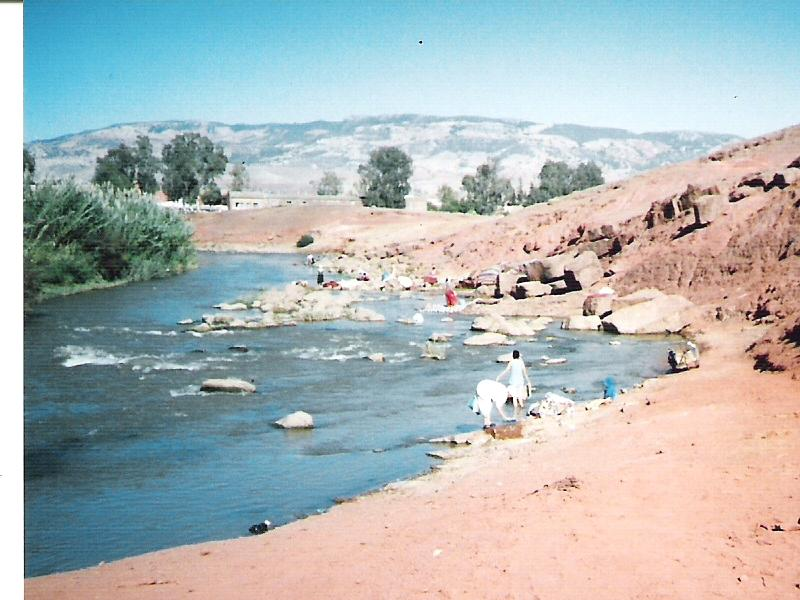
The Oum Er-Rbia River in central Morocco is the country's longest river. Besides being an important source of water for irrigation, it supplies most of the drinking water for the country's largest city, Casablanca

Nine river basin agencies are responsible for the management of water resources in Morocco. River basin agencies have a number of important responsibilities. They authorize water abstractions and wastewater discharges for all users, based on a basin master plan (Plan directeur d'aménagement intégré des ressources en eau, PDAIRE) that they prepare. They also collect charges for abstraction and effluent discharges. They are also supposed to provide financial help and technical assistance to service providers for the prevention of water pollution and the efficient use of water resources. They also monitor the quality and quantity of both surface and groundwater and are in charge of managing water-related emergencies. Finally, they should increase public awareness about water resources. The agencies cover the following basins ranked in the order of the available water resources in each basin: Sebou River, Moulouya River, Oum Er-Rbia River, Bou Regreg River, Tensift River, Loukkos River and the Souss-Massa basin, Ziz-Er Gheris et Sakia el Hamra-Oued Eddahab. The means available to the basin agencies are largely insufficient to carry out their functions.

=== Service provision ===
There are four categories of urban service providers in Morocco: private concessionnaires (38% of urban water customers), municipal utilities (31%), the national public company ONEE (28%), and municipalities providing services directly (3%). De jure, according to the municipal code of 1976 (Charte Communale), amended in 2002 and 2008, public services such as water supply, sewerage and electricity distribution are the responsibility of municipalities (communes). There are 1,547 municipalities in Morocco, including 249 urban and 1,298 rural municipalities. As mentioned above, some municipalities have delegated service provision to private concessionnaires. In other municipalities the Régies provide these services, often not on the basis of a specific contract. In the smaller municipalities ONEE often provides services, either with or without a contract (contrat de gestion déléguée) with the municipality. In the case of sewers, many smaller municipalities still provide this service directly, although there is a policy to gradually transfer sewer services to ONEE.

The 2008 amendment to the municipal code allowed for the creation of municipal associations (groupement d'agglomérations urbaines).

==== Private concessions ====
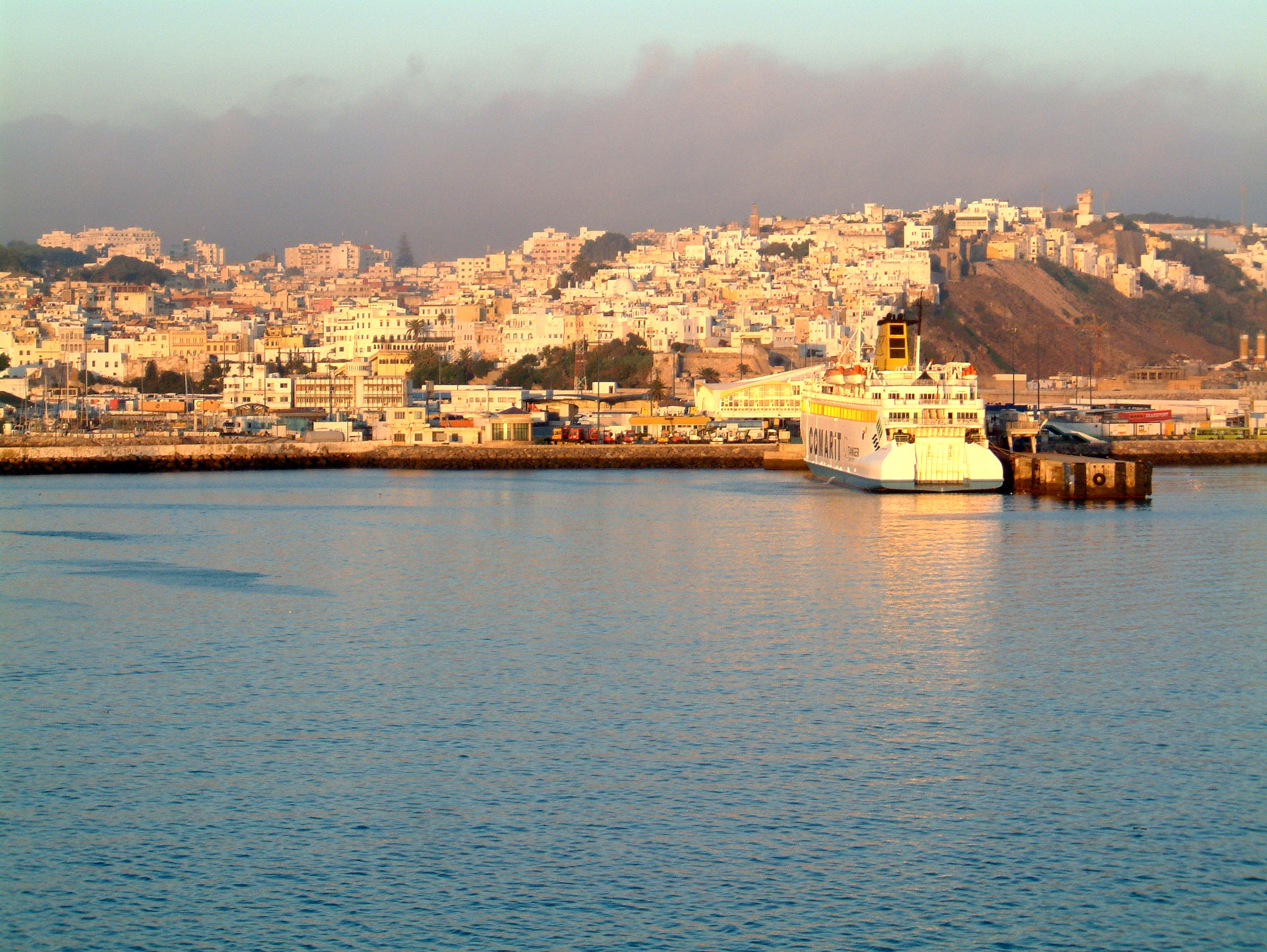
Water and sewer services in the city of Tangier on the Straits of Gibraltar are run by the private company Amendis, a subsidiary of Veolia Environnement of France

Several private multi-utility concessionaires provide drinking water, sewerage services and electricity in Casablanca, Rabat, Tangier, and Tetouan. Lydec, the concession holder in Casablanca, is owned by SUEZ Environnement (51%), the Moroccan insurance company RMA Watanya (15%) and the Moroccan investment company FIPAR-Holding (19.75%). In addition, 14.25% of the shares are traded on the Casablanca stock exchange since 2005. Amendis, a subsidiary of the French multi-national Veolia Environnement, is the concession holder in Tangier and Tetouan. In 2013, Veolia sold its Moroccan subsidiary Veolia Environnement Maroc that holds the concession to the British private equity group Actis Capital for €370 million after requests for tariff increases had been denied by the authorities. The company had also been criticized for failing to reach its investment targets, in particular concerning access to the poor. UAE-based Averda is the current concession holder in Rabat, having won a seven-year contract set to expire in 2022.

A fourth concessionnaire provides bulk water to Casablanca.

==== Municipal utilities: Régies autonomes ====
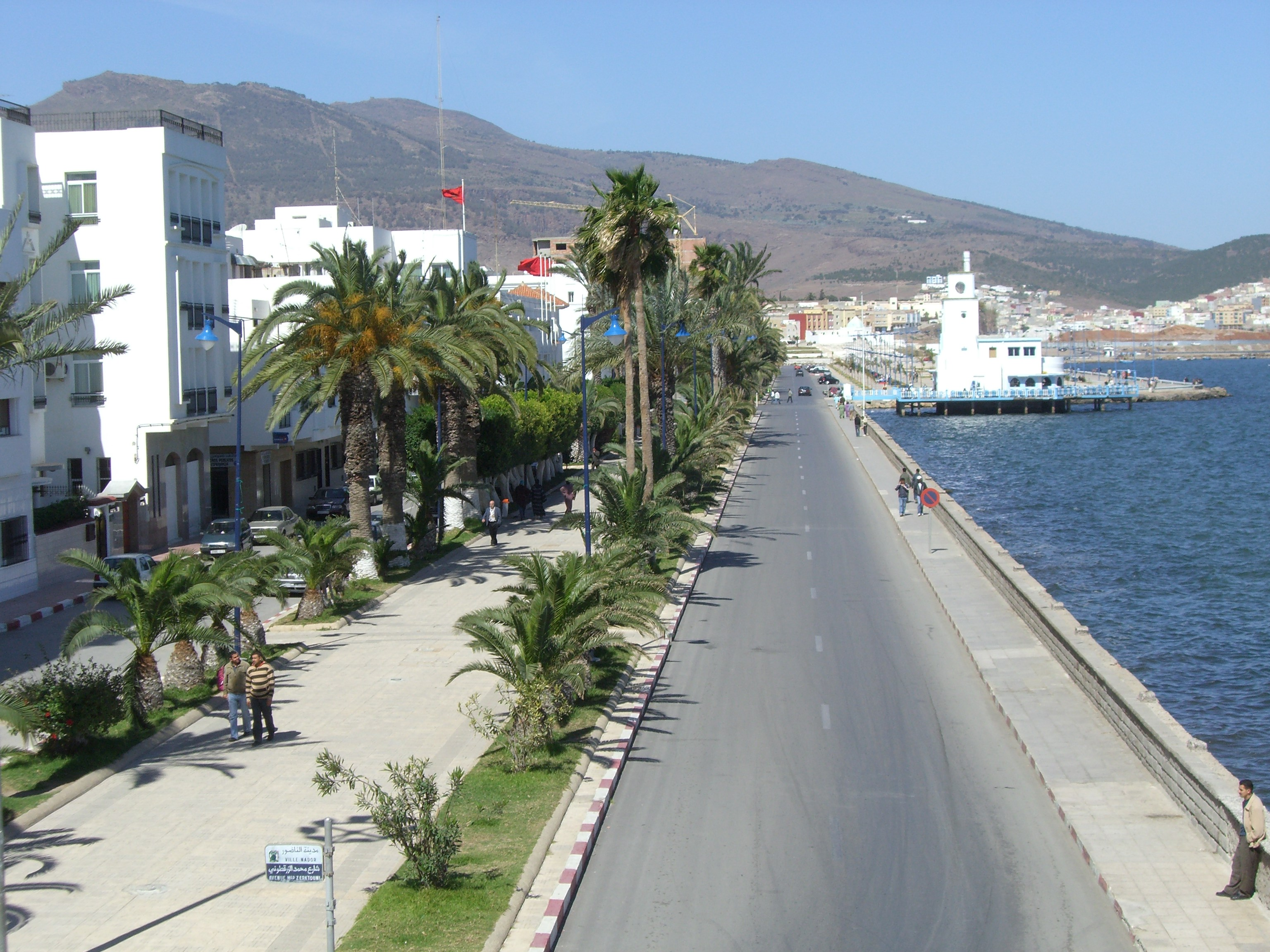
Water supply and sanitation in the Mediterranean city of Nador was transferred to ONEP after the municipal utility RADEEN was unable to clean up the Nador lagoon

12 specialized municipally owned public operators called Régies autonomes provide water in 12 medium to large cities. The same operators also provide sanitation in 11 cities and electricity distribution services in 7 cities. The largest of the cities served by Regies autonomes are Agadir, Fez, Marrakesh, Meknes and Oujda. Regies also exist in Chaouia, El Jadida, Kenitra, Larache, Safi, Tadla and Taza. Many of these utilities are owned by several municipalities (Régies intercommunales). The Régie Autonome de Distribution de l'Eau et de l'Elecricité de Nador (RADEEN) was taken over by ONEP in about 2007 as a result of the utility's failure to properly to clean up the highly polluted lagoon of Nador.

==== The national utility ONEE ====
ONEE (Office National de l'Electricité et de l'Eau Potable) is an electric utility and a bulk water provider that produces 80 percent of the country's drinking water and sells much of it to the Regies and the private concessionnaires. It also distributes water directly to customers in about 500 medium to small towns. ONEE has also taken over sanitation services in more than 65 of the towns where it distributes drinking water by 2009, and it is expected to take over sanitation services in a total of 191 towns by 2017. Furthermore, ONEE provides water through standposts to one third of the rural population that has access to an improved source of water. ONEE («Office national d'électricité et d'eau potable») was created through as alliance of the power company ONE and ONEP.

==== Direct service provision by municipalities: Régies directes ====
40 municipalities in small towns serve 3 percent of urban customers with water (Régies directes) through "non-professional and underfunded municipal departments". They also provide sewerage services in 280 towns (2003).

=== Associations ===
The Moroccan Association for Water Supply and Sanitation (Association Marocaine de l'Eau Potable et de l'Assainissement - AMEPA) is a trade association created in 1997 to "address upcoming challenges and defend the sector's interests". It has organized a number of national and international seminars and congresses in Morocco. It also participates in international conferences. In 2009 it had 120 members, including service providers, contractors, consulting firms and professional associations. Fassi Fihri, General Director of ONEP, was the President of AMEPA as of November 2009.

== Financial aspects ==
=== Tariffs and affordability ===
Morocco has a complicated system of water and sanitation tariffs and fees that consists of a large array of tariffs at different stages of the water cycle: water abstraction, sale in bulk, retail sales, as well as the collection, treatment and discharge of wastewater. Urban tariffs are differentiated by locality, by the quantity consumed, and by the type of use (residential, public, commercial and industrial). Urban tariff review mechanisms vary furthermore depending on whether the service provider is private or public, the process for the latter being more complicated and cumbersome than for the former. In general, the level of urban water tariffs is high compared to other countries in the Middle East and North Africa, making it hard to afford to the urban poor connected to the piped network. On the other hand, it is insufficient to allow for full cost recovery. 11% of all users, including a large share of poor users in both urban and rural areas, receive water for free from standpipes.

Abstraction fees. ONEE and the Régies have to pay fees (redevances) for water abstraction and wastewater discharge to the basin agencies. These fees were introduced on the basis of the Water Law of 1995. Their level is low, not allowing the basin agencies to cover its own administrative costs, not to speak of contributing to the financing of investments by service providers as foreseen by the law. Since their introduction the level of the fees has not been adjusted, so that in inflation-adjusted terms the value of the already low fee has been further eroded.

Bulk water tariffs. ONEE charges tariffs for the supply of bulk water to the private operators and the Régies. These tariffs are reviewed by the government together with the tariffs for the Régies and ONEE's retail water and sewer tariffs. Bulk water tariffs differ from one city to the other taking into account production costs. For example, bulk water tariffs for Casabalanca, where the service provider is private, are twice as high as for the neighboring city Settat. There is a 5% special tax on bulk water sales in order to finance the rural water supply program PAGER as well as another more important surtax to finance water supply in small towns.

Retail water tariffs. The same retail tariff structure applies to the entire country. Water and sewer tariffs in Morocco follow an increasing-block tariff structure, under which the tariff per cubic meter rises as consumption increases. The residential tariff has four blocks, the lowest applying to consumption of less than 6 m^{3} per month and the highest to consumption above 40 m^{3} per month. However, the level of retail tariffs varies from one locality to another. Standpipe services, which are common for the urban poor, are typically free. Utilities send bills to local governments. In a few cases, standpipe management has been entrusted to a gardien/gérant, who operates the faucet and charges users. According to a World Bank report, free standpipe services are pro-poor. But they are also increasingly unsustainable for operators, both in terms of wasted water (up to 40 percent) and in terms of lack of revenues. Operators are in favor of promoting individual connections in order to strengthen their revenue base.

Water and sewer retails tariffs were increased in 2006 throughout the country by reducing the size of the first block of the increasing-block tariff from 8 to 6 cubic meters per month and by increasing the fixed portion of the bill. The volumetric tariff for each tariff block remained unchanged. These modifications were equivalent to an 11% (check) tariff increase.

After the increase the average water tariff varied between Dirham 3.20 per m3 (US$0.29) in Meknes and Dirham 7.18 per m3 (US$0.66) in Casablanca. The sewer tariff varied between Dirham 0.59 per m3 (US$0.05) in Oujda and Dirham 1.64 per m3 (US$0.15) in Marrakesh. In 2002 it was decided that the sewer tariff in small towns served by ONEP should become uniform for all towns, using an increasing-block structure. The average ONEP sewer tariff was Dirham 1.50 per m3 in 2009. Although a decision has been taken in 2004 to increase the sewer tariff to Dirham 2.00 per m3. However, the application of this decision has been delayed and until 2009 only sewer tariffs were only increased in one town. Nevertheless, an increase to Dirham 2.20 per m3 has been envisaged for 2009.

Connection fees. In urban areas one-time connection fees for water and sewer connections are paid to the respective service provider. The level of the fees is determined based on a formula that takes into account the length of the water and sewer network in the city, as well as the length of the facade of each property (for water connection fees charged by ONEP, called taxe riveraine) or the area of the property (for all connection fees charged by the Régies and private operators, as well as for sewer connection fees charged by ONEP, all together called Participation au Premier Etablissement or PPE). These fees do not include the costs of actually establishing the connection from the service line in the street, which the beneficiary has to pay himself separately. As in other countries, it also does not cover the costs of plumbing installations inside the property. Connection fees to the water and sewer network are a major source of funding for service providers. At the same time their high level constitutes an obstacle to expand the network, despite a policy to allow poor customers to pay part of the connection fee in installments that are added to the monthly water bill over a period of up to 7 years (branchements sociaux). These difficulties are illustrated by the example of Casablanca where an initial annual target of 10,000 social connections had been set, but only 1,250 were implemented every year until 2006. The National Human Development Initiative waives connection fees for selected poor urban neighborhoods

Average connection fees ranged from an equivalent of US$220 to 500 for water and US$880 to 1,650 for sewerage in 2004. However, according to another source, in 2008 the connection fee for sewerage charged by ONEP was only 1,600 Dirham (about US$145).

Affordability. Data from the National Household Living Standards Survey 1998/99 assessed total expenditures for water supply at MAD 84.8/person/year in urban areas and 147.4 MAD/person/year in rural areas, or 1.8 and 2.9 percent of average total per capita expenditure.

=== Cost recovery ===
Cost recovery in the sector remains a challenge. ONEE is nominally financially autonomous through its tariff revenues, but it receives investment subsidies of Dirham 150 million per year for rural water supply and half its sanitation investments are financed by the government budget and municipalities. The Regies have to rely to a large extent on connection fees for their revenues.

=== Investment ===
The investments in the water and sanitation sector increased substantially between 2003 and 2005. In urban water distribution it increased from Dirham 0.9bn to 1.5bn, in rural water supply from Dirham 0.5bn to 0.8bn, in water production from 0.3bn to 0.6bn, and in sanitation from Dirham 1.1bn to 2.8bn. Overall investments doubled from Dirham 2.8bn (US$337m) to 5.7bn (US$687m). Per capita investment in water supply and sanitation thus stood at US$21 per capita and year, a relatively high level compared to other middle-income countries.

=== Financing ===
Investments are financed from tariff revenues, various subsidies and transfers (grants and soft loans) by external partners. However, there are also substantial cross-subsidies. For example, bulk water tariffs charged by ONEE to the private concessionnaires and the Régies are higher than production costs. The surplus is used to cross-subsidize ONEE's activities in rural water supply and in sanitation, where tariffs do not cover costs.

Furthermore, according to a World Bank study of 2008, there is a cross-subsidy of about Dirham 1bn from electricity users who are charged distribution tariffs that are above costs. This allows the concessionnaires and the Régies to generate the revenue necessary to pay for the inflated tariffs for bulk water, which in turn allows ONEE to cross-subsidize rural water supply and sanitation at an amount that is also about Dirham 1bn.

== External cooperation ==
External cooperation plays a major role in the Moroccan water and sanitation sector. External partners provide investment finance and technical assistance. Beginning in 2002 the African Development Bank, the European Union and subsequently the World Bank also provided budget support linked to the fulfillment of certain policy conditions. The major external partners in the sector are, in addition to the three named above, France, Germany and Japan. Other external partners are Belgium, the Islamic Development Bank, Kuwait, Luxemburg, Spain and the United States.

External partners work increasingly together to finance joint programs instead of financing specific projects. An example is the rural water supply program PAGER initiated in 1995 that was supported by Belgium, the European Union, France, Germany, Japan, Kuwait, Luxemburg and the World Bank. A more recent example is the support for the National Sanitation Program by the European Union, France and Germany.

=== African Development Bank ===
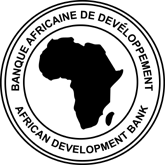
The African Development Bank (AfDB) has financed nine drinking water projects in Morocco since 1978. The total amount of its funding in the sector has been US$180 million until 2006, benefiting 20 Moroccan towns, in particular Tangier. On-going projects, all executed by ONEP, include the ninth drinking water and sanitation project, appraised in 2006, which benefits rural populations in four provinces and foresees wastewater treatment in three towns (Khouribga, Oued Zem and Boujaâd) and the tenth drinking water supply project approved in 2008 which supports drinking water supply in Khénifra, Taounate, Settat, Marrakesh and Tamesna as well as neighbouring small towns. In 2003 the AfDB provided a loan for a water sector adjustment program. In 2012 the AfDB approved a US$157 million loan to finance a Marrakesh Region Water Supply Project together with AFD (US$68.7 million), ONEE and the Office Chérifien des Phosphates (OCP), each providing US$66.8 million. It will finance bulk water transmission from the Al Massira Dam for drinking water, tourism and mining. The project is expected to be completed in 2017.

=== European Union ===

The European Union supports the sector through grants, as well as through loans from the European Investment Bank (EIB). The EIB has supported water supply and sanitation projects in six cities (Marrakesh, Settat, Meknes, Agadir, Oujda and Fez), as well as a number of small towns. Between 1997 and 2006 it provided 10 loans totaling Euro 283m. In 2006 it approved another loan of Euro 40m for sanitation in the Sebou basin, a highly polluted river where Fez and Meknes are located. In 2002 the European Union provided a Euro 120m grant to support the first water sector adjustment program to Morocco, which aimed at rationalizing water resources management. The program's specific objectives were to effectively implement the 1995 Water Framework Law, to reduce the costs for the state budget and to increase the effectiveness of the sector institutions.

=== France ===
Water supply and sanitation is a focal area of French development cooperation with Morocco. In 2007 the French Development Agency (AFD) supported projects with a value of Euro 130m for urban and rural water supply and Euro 145m for sanitation. Geographically the projects are concentrated in the Sebou river basin, in Agadir and in Nador. In Nador French aid contributes through a loan approved in 2007 to clean up the highly polluted lagoon of Nador, the largest lagoon in the Mediterranean. The clean-up plan for the bay is inspired by similar experiences in France (Contrats de Baie) under which different public players work together for the common goal to clean up a coastal bay.

=== Germany ===
Germany has supported the Moroccan water sector since the early 1980s and was among the first donors to support the Moroccan government's efforts at expanding access to sanitation in small and medium-sized towns in the early 1990s. German aid projects are administered by KfW in charge of investment projects, GTZ in charge of technical cooperation and InWent in charge of training. In 2009 the total volume of approved and on-going investment projects supported by KfW was Euro 407m, all executed by ONEP in small and medium-sized towns and rural areas. GTZ supports the Ministry of Energy, Mining, Water and Environment and three basin agencies (Tensift, Souss-Massa, and Oum er-Rbia) in improving the integrated and sustainable management of water resources. The Euro 12m project was initiated in 2008 and is scheduled to be completed in 2017.

=== Islamic Development Bank ===
In 2006 the Islamic Development Bank provided two loans of Dirham 270 million (about Euro 27 million) for water supply. The projects are executed by ONEP.

=== Japan ===
Since 1994 JBIC has provided loans of Dirham 3.6 billion to ONEP. In 2008 JICA granted a 13.6 billion Yen (about Euro 90 million) loan to Morocco to finance rural water supply projects in the Provinces Chefchaouen, Taounate et Khénifra. The project will benefit 408 villages (douars) with 241,335 inhabitants and will be implemented until 2013. It is the most important loan provided by JICA and its predecessor JBIC to ONEP.

=== Spain ===
The Spanish government supports a number of water and sanitation projects in Morocco. A Euro 15m rural water and sanitation project implemented by ONEP in the provinces Alhucemas, Nador, Taunat and Tazaand was approved in 2006. In the field of water resources management it supported the basin agency for the Loukkos River between 2003 and 2009, as well as the basin agency for the Molouya River in 2006/07.

=== United States ===

USAID supported improved water resources management in the Souss-Masa basin between 1999 and 2005.

=== World Bank ===
In 2009 the active portfolio of the World Bank included a US$60 million loan for a rural water supply and sanitation project approved in 2005 (implemented by ONEP) and a US$7 million grant from the Global Partnership for Output-based aid to increase urban access to water supply and sanitation (implemented by the Ministry of Interior). It also includes a US$100 million loan to support the National Human Development Initiative approved in 2006, of which water supply and sanitation is an element. The World Bank also provided budget support through a US$100 million to Morocco through a Water Sector Policy Development Loan approved in 2007. It has been engaged in the Moroccan water and sanitation sector since 1972 with nine investment projects with a lending volume of more than US$500 million.
