= Aouda (disambiguation) =

Aouda is a character in a novel by Jules Verne.

Aouda may also refer to:

Geography

- Aïn El Aouda, a city in Morocco

Mars analogue research

- Aouda.X, a Mars analogue space suit, developed by the Austrian Space Forum
- Aouda.S, sister suit to Aouda.X
- Aouda.D, mockup version of Aouda.X for display purposes, currently at the Dachstein ice caves
