= Skhirate-Témara Prefecture =

Coordinates: 33°53′N 6°59′W

Skhirate-Témara Prefecture عمالة الصخيرات-تمارة ⵜⴰⵎⵏⴱⴰⴹⵜ ⵏ ⵚⵚⵅⵉⵕⴰⵜ-ⵜⵎⴰⵔⴰ
- Prefecture
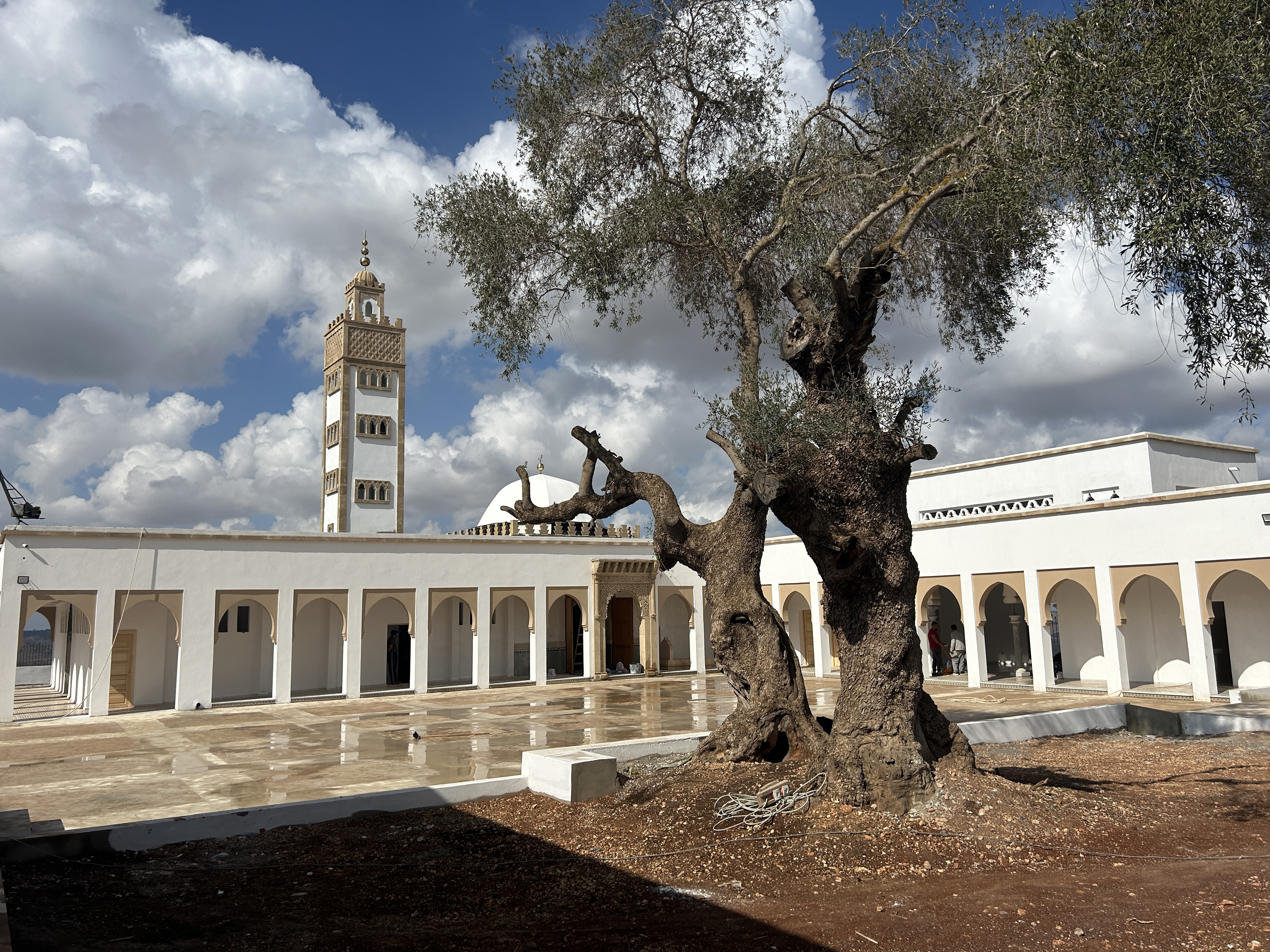
- Mausoleum of Abdallah Ibn Yasin at Krifla

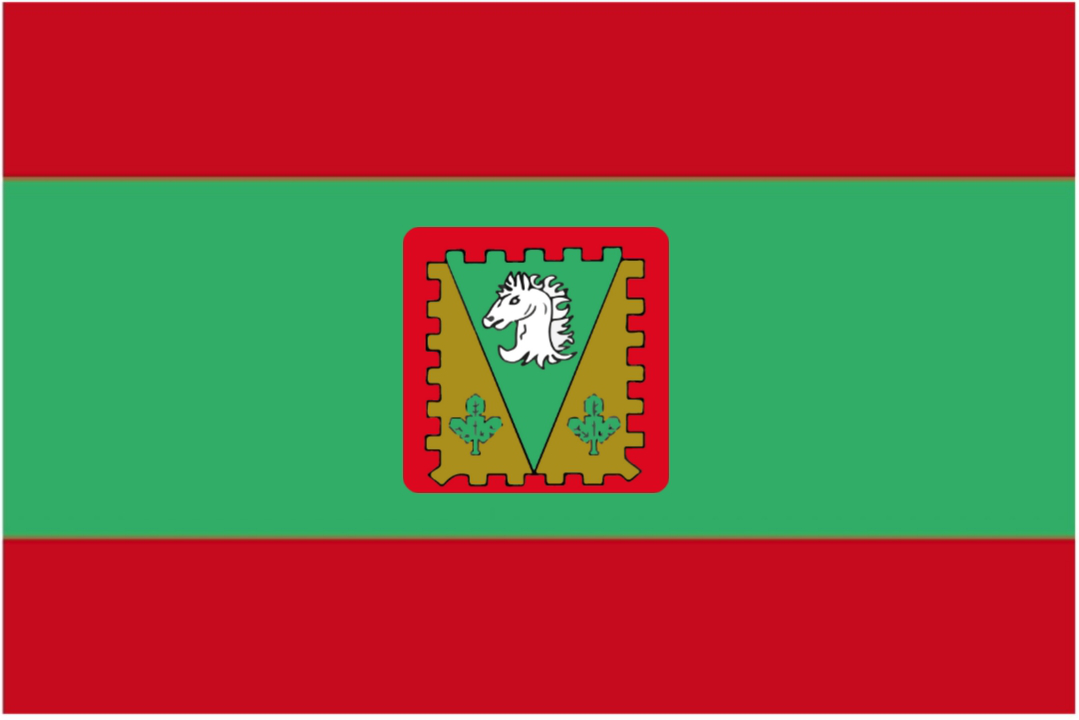
- Flag
- Interactive map of Skhirate-Témara Prefecture
- Country: Morocco
- Region: Rabat-Salé-Kénitra
- Seat: Témara

Area
  - Total: 485 km^{2} (187 sq mi)

Population (2024)
  - Total: 783,475
  - Density: 1,620/km^{2} (4,180/sq mi)

Skhirate-Témara is a Moroccan prefecture located in the Rabat-Salé-Kénitra region, with its capital in Témara.

Created in 1983, it covers an area of 485 square kilometres (187 sq mi) and had a population of 783,475 inhabitants in 2024. It is part of the Rabat metropolitan area and represents a zone of significant urban and residential growth. Its governor since 2024 has been Mustapha Ennouhi.

The major cities are:

- Temara
- Skhirat
- Ain El Aouda
- Tamesna

== Geography ==
Located along the Atlantic coast, the prefecture of Skhirate-Témara benefits from a coastline of approximately 25 kilometers of beaches.

Its territory includes both expanding urban areas, particularly around Témara and Tamesna, as well as peri-urban and rural areas further inland.

== Climate ==
The climate is Mediterranean with oceanic influence. It is characterized by mild winters, moderate summers, and irregular rainfall, with humidity influenced by the proximity to the Atlantic Ocean.

== Environment ==
The prefecture includes several natural and managed forest areas. The Rabat green belt, covering approximately 1,500 hectares (3,700 acres), constitutes one of the main ecological zones of the region, despite the partial degradation of some historic forest areas.

== Administration ==
=== Administrative divisions ===
The prefecture of Skhirate-Témara includes:

- six urban municipalities: Témara, Skhirate, Harhoura, Ain Attig, Tamesna, and Ain El Aouda;
- five rural communes: Sabbah, Mers El Kheir, El Menzeh, Oumazza, and Sidi Yahya Zaër.

== Subdivisions ==
The province is divided administratively into the following:

Name	Geographic code	Type	Households	Population (2004)	Foreign population	Moroccan population	Notes
Ain El Aouda	501.01.01.	Municipality	5701	25105	3	25102	
Harhoura	501.01.03.	Municipality	2297	9245	454	8791	
Skhirat	501.01.05.	Municipality	8574	43025	74	42951	
Temara	501.01.07.	Municipality	48066	225497	314	225183	
El Menzeh	501.03.01.	Rural commune	1190	5999	14	5985	
Oumazza	501.03.03.	Rural commune	2249	10530	5	10525	
Sidi Yahya Zaer	501.03.11.	Rural commune	5624	28773	1	28772	
Ain Attig	501.05.01.	Municipality	3165	17688	11	17677	
Mers El Kheir	501.05.03.	Rural commune	2725	14488	16	14472	
Sabbah	501.05.05.	Rural commune	2229	12912	5	12907	
