= Aïn El Aouda =

Ain Aouda عين العودة
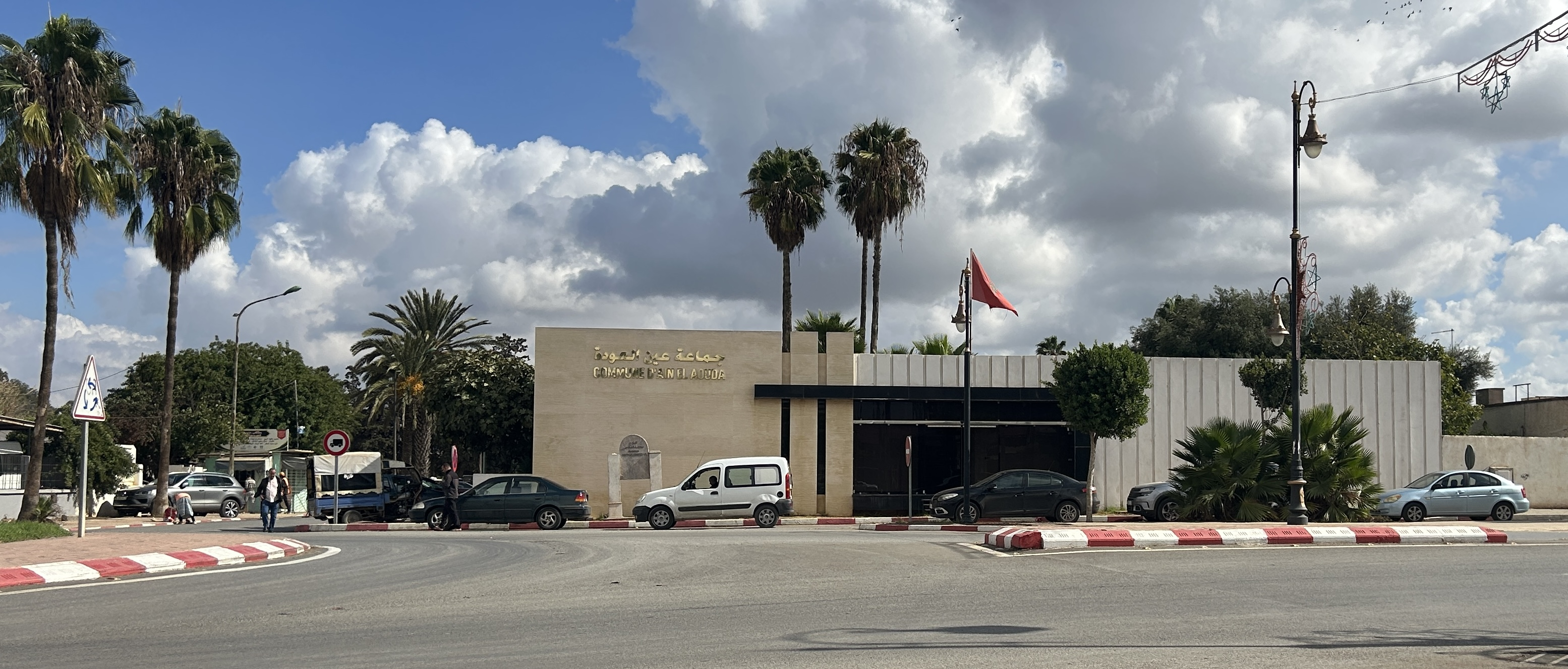
- Interactive map of Ain Aouda
- Coordinates: 33°48′40″N 6°47′32″W
- Country: Morocco
- Region: Rabat-Salé-Kénitra
- Prefecture: Skhirate-Témara Prefecture

Population (2024)
  - Total: 98,502
- Time zone: UTC+0 (GMT)

Ain Aouda is a city in Morocco, situated in Skhirate-Témara Prefecture. As of the 2024 census, the city's population was 98,502.

Located 27 km south of Rabat and 24 km east of Temara. Situated at the foot of the Zaer plateau, it boasts a pleasant climate, making it a popular destination for those with respiratory conditions. The town is also known for its agricultural areas, renowned for cultivating all kinds of early-season crops and seasonal fruits. It is particularly famous for its "Cheraga" harvest season and is home to a branch of one of the world's leading pharmaceutical manufacturers.

The city is rumored to house a detention centre of the Moroccan secret services, known as the DST (Direction de surveillance du Térritoire).

== See also ==
Rabat
Temara
