= Tamesna (city) =

Tamesna ⵜⴰⵎⵙⵏⴰ
- Interactive map of Tamesna ⵜⴰⵎⵙⵏⴰ
- Coordinates: 33°50′N 6°55′W
- Country: Morocco
- Region: Rabat-Salé-Kénitra
- Prefecture: Skhirate-Témara
- Time zone: UTC+0 (GMT)

Tamesna is a new city created in Skhirate-Témara Prefecture near the capital Rabat, it is a part of Sidi Yahya Zaer commune. The idea became official on July 22, 2004.

The goal is to relieve Rabat of its growing urbanization. The new city will have access to the Casablanca-Rabat expressway, as well as opportunity for better planning of infrastructure.

It is being planned jointly between the King of Morocco and many private developers from several countries. Many Moroccan cities are overcrowded and Tamesna will provide housing for the low classes of the area, with bad accommodation and much needed light industry and commercial areas. Tamesna will have many parks and green areas. One of the developments being planned is Les Collines, which is a joint venture between Mandarine Holdings and the Moroccan government, and will provide 1, 2 and 3 bedroom apartments in 12 blocks close the park and commercial and shopping areas.
