= National Human Development Initiative =

National Initiative for Human Development
- المبادرة الوطنية للتنمية البشرية
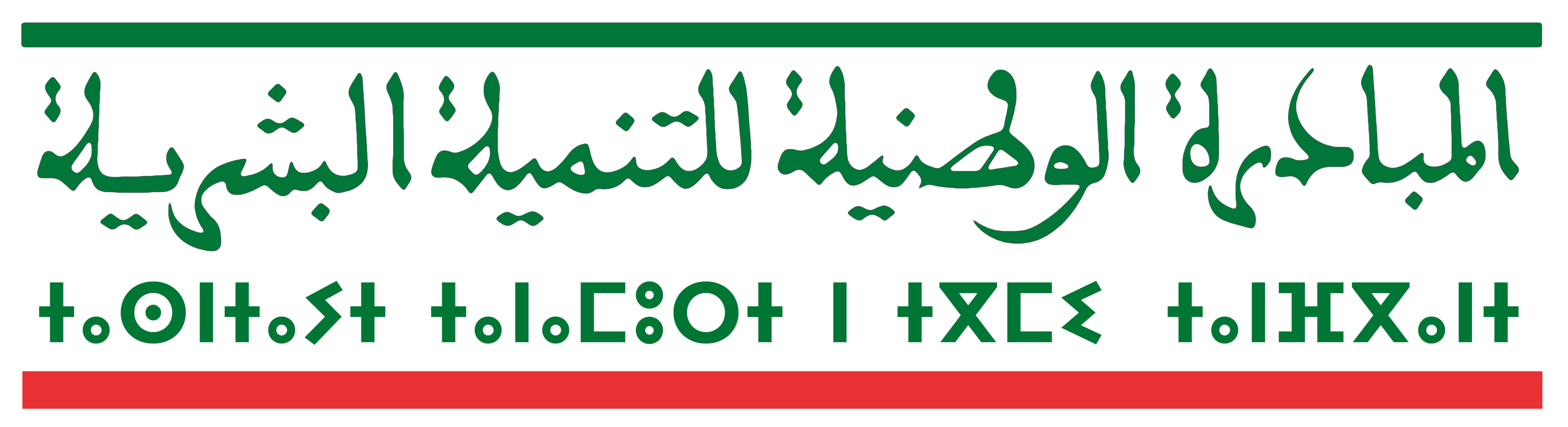
- Abbreviation: INDH
- Founded: May 18, 2005; 20 years ago
- Founder: King Mohammed VI
- Type: Public development program
- Parent organization: Ministry of the Interior
- Website: www.indh.ma

The National Initiative for Human Development (INDH; Arabic: المبادرة الوطنية للتنمية البشرية) is a public development program launched in Morocco in 2005 by King Mohammed VI. It aims to combat poverty, vulnerability, and social exclusion, while reducing territorial disparities and improving living conditions.

The INDH is based on a participatory approach involving local authorities, decentralized state services, and civil society actors. It complements public policies related to human development.

== History ==
The INDH was officially launched on 18 May 2005 by King Mohammed VI.

At the local level, its implementation relies on committees bringing together elected officials, representatives of state services, and civil society actors. At the central level, it is overseen by coordination bodies under the authority of the Ministry of the Interior.

The national coordination of the program is ensured by a wali (governor-level official). Several officials have held this position, including Aziz Dadas (2005–2009), Nadira El Guermai (2009–2018), and Mohammed Dardouri since 2018.
