= Temara =

Temara تمارة ⵜⵎⴰⵔⴰ
- city
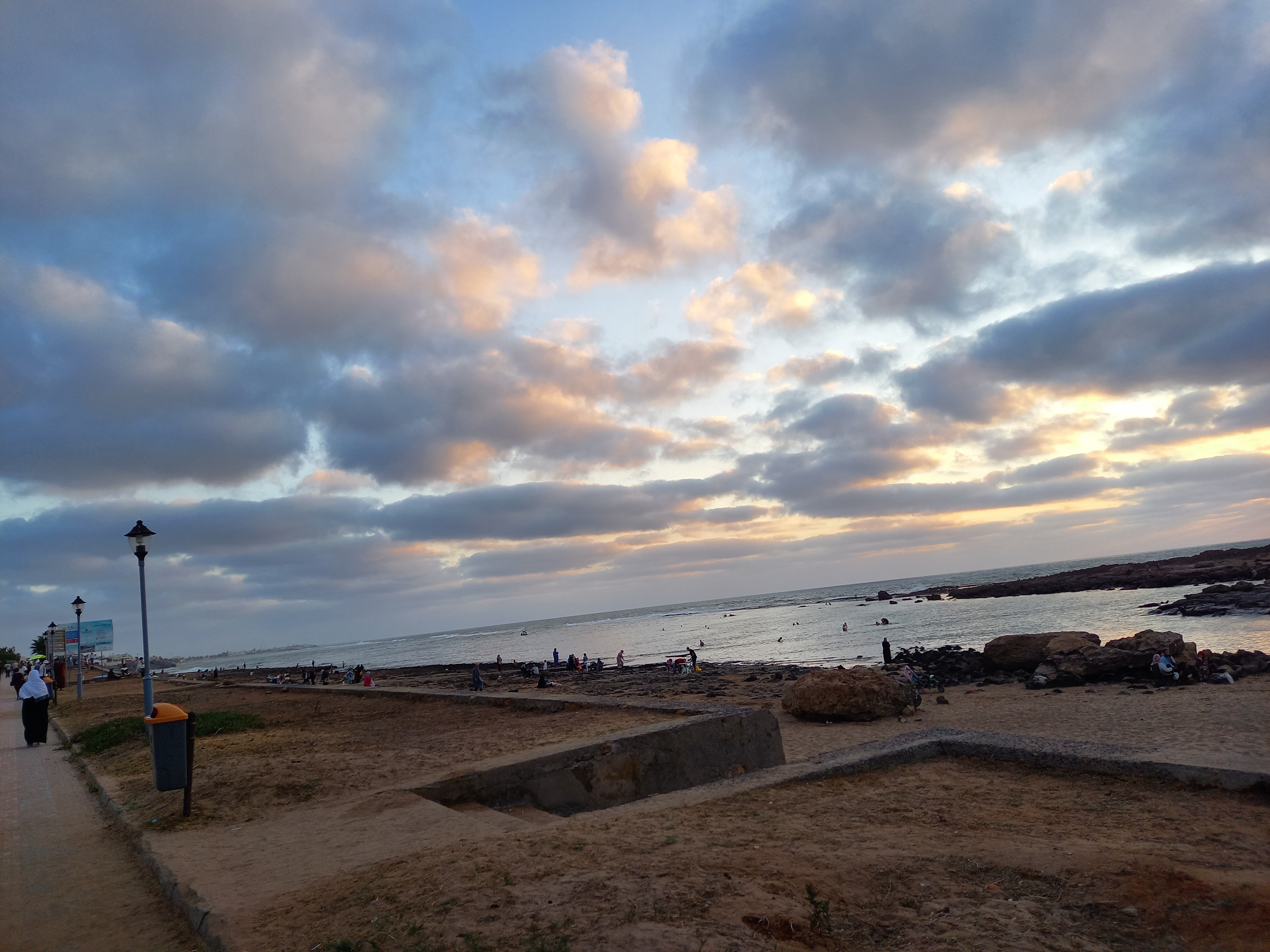
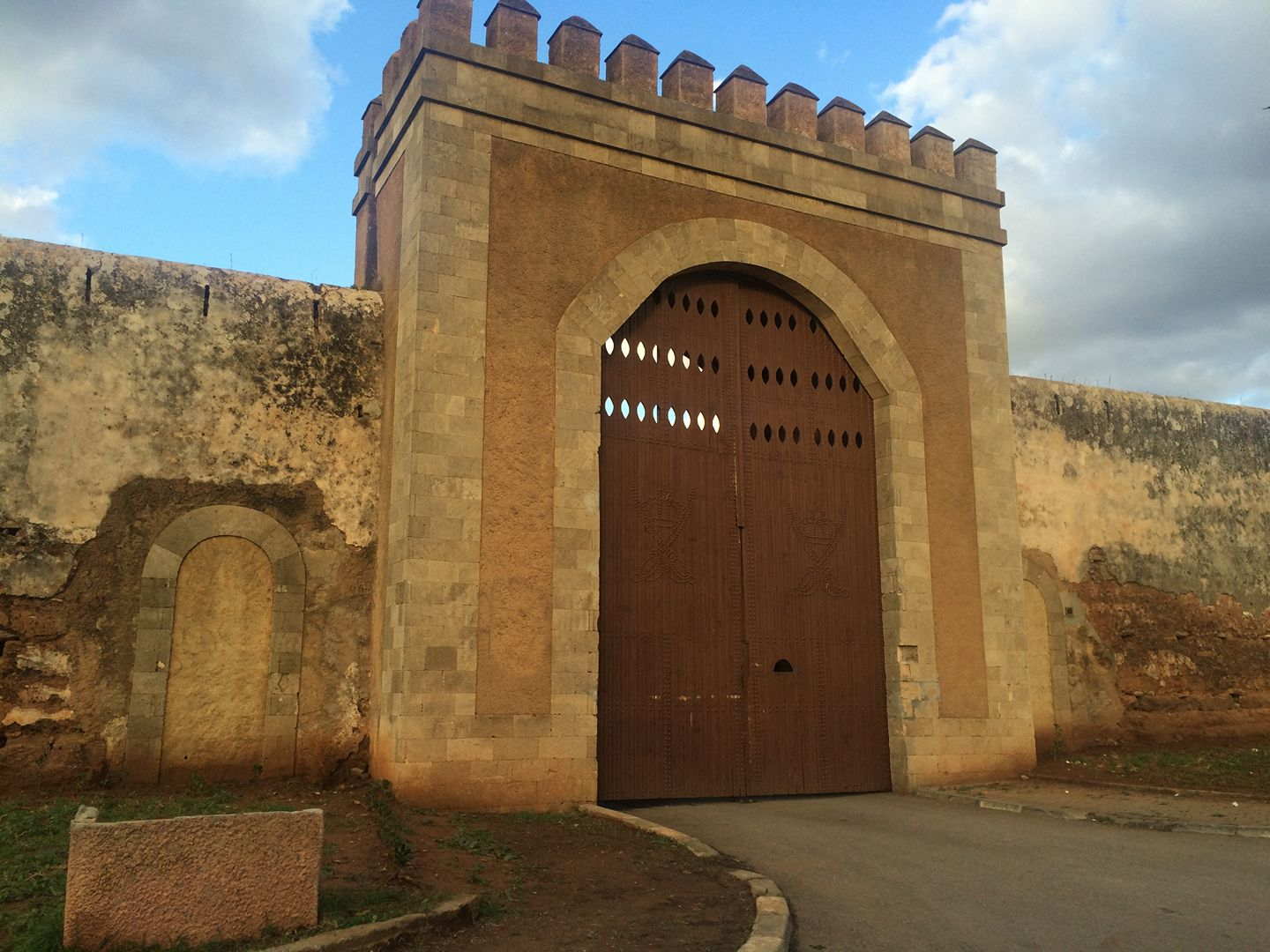
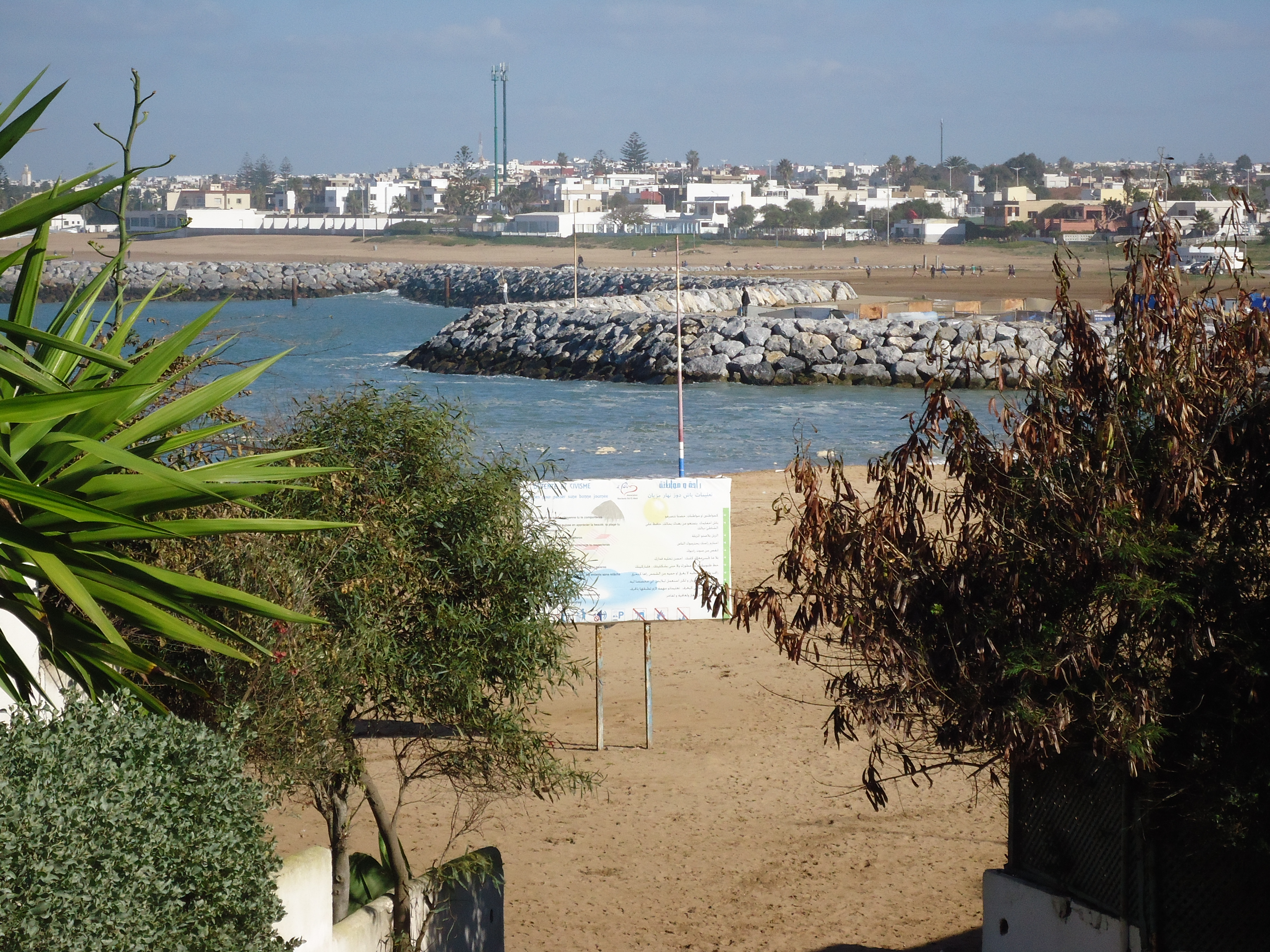
- Interactive map of Temara
- Coordinates: 33°55′36″N 6°54′44″W
- Country: Morocco
- Region: Rabat-Salé-Kénitra
- Prefecture: Skhirate-Témara

Population (2014)
  - Total: 313,510
  - Rank: 14th in Morocco
- Time zone: UTC+0 (GMT)

Temara (Arabic: تمارة; Standard Moroccan Tamazight: ⵜⵎⴰⵔⴰ) is a coastal city in Morocco. It is located in the region of Rabat-Salé-Kénitra, directly south of Rabat on the Atlantic coast, in the suburban area of the capital. The city with 313,510 inhabitants as of 2014 is the capital of Skhirate-Témara Prefecture. It is twinned with Saint Germain en Laye, France. The city has beaches and a small pleasure port.

== History ==
Temara was founded in the twelfth century (1130–1163) by Sultan Abd al-Mu'min, who built a mosque there and named it Massa. Five centuries later, Mulai Ismail built the current wall and made from Temara a ribat (casern) around Said mosque. Later, Mulay Abd ar-Rahman (1822–1859) and Mulay Abdul Aziz (1894–1908), completed (Kasbah of the Udayas) as religious and military camps. Temara also has a small network of coastal caves, notably El Harhoura 2 cave and El Mnasra cave (formerly known as the Smugglers' Cave), which are archaeological sites dating back 120,000 years, from the Aterian age.

== Climate ==
Temara has a hot-summer Mediterranean climate (Köppen climate classification Csa). In winter there is more rainfall than in summer. The average annual temperature in Temara is 17.8 °C (64.0 °F). About 505 mm (19.88 in) of precipitation falls annually.

Climate data for Temara
Month	Jan	Feb	Mar	Apr	May	Jun	Jul	Aug	Sep	Oct	Nov	Dec	Year
Mean daily maximum °C (°F)	17.2 (63.0)	18.4 (65.1)	20.3 (68.5)	21.8 (71.2)	23.6 (74.5)	26.0 (78.8)	28.1 (82.6)	28.8 (83.8)	27.6 (81.7)	25.4 (77.7)	21.2 (70.2)	18.4 (65.1)	23.1 (73.5)
Mean daily minimum °C (°F)	7.3 (45.1)	7.7 (45.9)	9.3 (48.7)	10.8 (51.4)	13.1 (55.6)	15.9 (60.6)	17.6 (63.7)	18.2 (64.8)	16.9 (62.4)	14.3 (57.7)	10.9 (51.6)	8.4 (47.1)	12.5 (54.6)
Average precipitation mm (inches)	75 (3.0)	66 (2.6)	61 (2.4)	53 (2.1)	21 (0.8)	5 (0.2)	0 (0)	1 (0.0)	7 (0.3)	41 (1.6)	74 (2.9)	101 (4.0)	505 (19.9)
Source: Climate-Data.org, Climate data

== Economy ==
Temara is close to Morocco's two main cities, Rabat, the capital, and economic center Casablanca.

Two main zones share the essence of the industrial units in the city of Temara. The first is in the direction of Casablanca, and, with a total area of 120 hectares, extensible to 300 Ha work 55 industrial units in this zone, contains the more clean industry sectors (textiles, packaging, printing, food). The second industrial zone is at the other end of town, in the direction of Rabat. It is the industrial zone Attasnia, which, with a total of 20 hectares, contains 23 industrial units (such as textiles, electronics, chemicals).

== People ==
The population was at first constituted by Zaer tribes and different tribes of Oudayas (Military groups from different regions of Morocco that were established by the Sultan. They had the right to cultivate the land in exchange for their Military service to the Sultan). Now the population was diversified by all ethnicities in Morocco: Arabs and various Amazigh groups, Chleuhs and Hassanis).

== Notable people ==
- Mourad Hdiouad - Moroccan football manager
- Hamza Igamane - Moroccan football player

== See also ==
- Rabat Zoo
