= Netherlands women's national futsal team =

Netherlands
- Nickname(s): Oranje (Orange)
- Association: Royal Dutch Football Association (Koninklijke Nederlandse Voetbalbond)
- Confederation: UEFA (Europe)
- Head coach: Teuny Bosma
- Captain: Zoyla Barendse
- FIFA code: NED
- FIFA ranking: 19 ▲1 (24 September 2026)
- Highest FIFA ranking: 15 (May – October 2024)
- Lowest FIFA ranking: 15 (May – October 2024)
Home colours	Away colours

First international
- Netherlands 6–1 Belgium (Kerkrade, Netherlands; 2 May 1983)

Biggest win
- Belgium 1–9 Netherlands (Hamme, Belgium; 7 April 1984); Netherlands 9–1 Belgium (Sas van Gent, Netherlands; 13 December 1986); Moldova 0–8 Netherlands (Ciorescu, Moldova; 19 August 2021)

Biggest defeat
- Italy 8–0 Netherlands (Salsomaggiore Terme, Italy; 26 September 2022)

The Netherlands women's national futsal team (Dutch: Nederlands vrouwen zaalvoetbalteam) represents the Netherlands in international women's futsal, and is directed by the Royal Dutch Football Association (KNVB).

== History ==
Founded in 1983, the Dutch women's futsal team stands as one of the world's earliest women's futsal teams. They debuted that year with a 6–1 victory against Belgium in a friendly match in Kerkrade.

In September 2017, the Royal Dutch Football Association announced the return of the national team after a nine-year hiatus since their last match against Spain, marking the beginning of a new era. Five months later, they played a double-header against the Finnish national team, losing the first match 1–3 and winning the second 2–0.

After the establishment of the UEFA Women's Futsal Championship by UEFA in 2018, the team was one of the few European nations to participate. It was eliminated in the Preliminary Round in 2019 and in the Main Round in 2022 and 2023, and it has yet to make its debut in the tournament.

In October 2024, the team took part in the qualifiers for the inaugural FIFA Futsal Women's World Cup, scheduled to be held in the Philippines, but was eliminated following a loss to Poland in the Main Round.

== Results and fixtures ==
The following is a list of matches in the last 12 months, as well as any future matches that have been scheduled.

Legend

Win Draw Lose Void or Postponed Fixture

=== 2024 ===
6 October Friendly	Netherlands	9–2	Belgium	Zeist, Netherlands
	van den Boomgaard 2', 27', 32'; Dijkstra 7'; Hand 9', 18', 37'; Brand 11'; Luijks 22'	Report	Bougard 22'; Meyers 31'	Stadium: KNVB Campus; Referee: Davey Markerink (Netherlands)

17 October 2025 World Cup qualifying	Netherlands	6–0	Kazakhstan	Astana, Kazakhstan
14:00	Hand 4'35", 35'27"; Visser 10'59"; Dijkstra 16'36"; Van Den Boomgaard 35'52"; Reitsma 40'30"	Report		Stadium: Sairan Arena; Attendance: 250; Referee: George Jansizian (Sweden)

18 October 2025 World Cup qualifying	Poland	4–2	Netherlands	Astana, Kazakhstan
14:00	Bała 8'25" (pen.); Szostak 27'42"; Szydełko 34'05"; Van Den Boomgaard 36'11" (o.g.)	Report	Hand 32'00"; Barendse 35'05"	Stadium: Sairan Arena; Attendance: 100; Referee: Elwyn Rhys Parry (Wales)

== Coaching staff ==
=== Head coaches ===
Period	Coach	Notes	Ref(s)
2008–2009	(Netherlands) Vic Hermans		
2018–2019	(Netherlands) Marius Priveé		
2019–2022	(Netherlands) Niña George		
2022–present	(Netherlands) Teuny Bosma		

== Players ==
=== Current squad ===
- The following 14 players are called up for the 2025 FIFA World Cup qualifying main round matches against Kazakhstan and Poland on 17 and 18 October 2024.

No.	Pos.	Player	Date of birth (age)	Caps	Goals	Club
1	GK	Anna-Marie Reitsma	5 May 1997 (age 29)	22	1	(Royal Dutch Football Association) OS Lusitanos
12	GK	Lisa Franken	8 April 1996 (age 30)	1	0	(Royal Dutch Football Association) ZVV Den Haag
2	DF	Kelly Hollak	2 January 2002 (age 24)	3	0	(Royal Dutch Football Association) FC Marlène
3	DF	Sanne Brand	17 June 1996 (age 30)	16	1	(Royal Dutch Football Association) FC Marlène
4	DF	Tessa Grashuis	12 July 2000 (age 26)	7	1	(Royal Dutch Football Association) G.S.F.V. Drs. Vijfje
7	DF	Aaike Verschoor	16 August 1989 (age 37)	34	4	(Royal Dutch Football Association) FC Marlène
8	DF	Zoyla Barendse	21 June 2002 (age 24)	19	3	(Royal Dutch Football Association) FC Marlène
11	DF	Corina Luijks	20 November 1995 (age 30)	3	1	(Italian Football Federation) Como 1907
14	DF	Nancy Loth	8 December 1991 (age 34)	17	3	(Italian Football Federation) Atletico Chiaravalle
15	DF	Alyssa Dijkstra	15 December 1995 (age 30)	4	2	(Royal Dutch Football Association) Zvg Cagemax
5	FW	Simone Hand	5 April 2000 (age 26)	13	15	(Royal Dutch Football Association) FC Marlène
6	FW	Amy Visser	19 February 1996 (age 30)	10	1	(Royal Dutch Football Association) FC Marlène
9	FW	Kayla Van Den Boomgaard	16 August 2000 (age 26)	12	4	(Royal Dutch Football Association) OS Lusitanos
10	FW	Jennifer Oliveira	26 May 1993 (age 33)	20	8	(Royal Dutch Football Association) OS Lusitanos

== Competitive record ==
=== FIFA Futsal Women's World Cup ===
FIFA Futsal Women's World Cup record									Qualification record					
Year	Round	Position	Pld	W	D*	L	GF	GA	Pld	W	D*	L	GF	GA
(Philippines) 2025	Did not qualify								2	1	0	1	8	4
Total	Best: —	0/1	—	—	—	—	—	—	2	1	0	1	8	4
* Draws include knockout matches decided on penalty kicks.

=== UEFA Women's Futsal Championship ===
UEFA Women's Futsal Championship record									Qualifying record					
Year	Round	Position	Pld	W	D*	L	GF	GA	Pld	W	D*	L	GF	GA
(Portugal) 2019	Did not qualify								3	1	1	1	11	10
(Portugal) 2022	Did not qualify								6	4	0	2	29	9
(Hungary) 2023	Did not qualify								6	5	0	1	18	8
(Croatia) 2027	Did not qualify								3	1	0	2	5	6
Total	Best:	0/4	—	—	—	—	—	—	18	11	1	6	63	33
* Draws include knockout matches decided on penalty kicks.

=== Head-to-head record ===
Key

Positive balance (more wins than losses)
Neutral balance (as many wins as losses)
Negative balance (more losses than wins)

The following table shows the Netherlands' all-time official international record per opponent:

Opponent	Pld	W	D	L	GF	GA	GD	W%
Armenia	1	1	0	0	6	0	+6	100.00
Belarus	1	1	0	0	6	1	+5	100.00
Belgium	17	13	3	1	80	25	+55	76.47
Bosnia and Herzegovina	1	1	0	0	7	3	+4	100.00
Croatia	1	1	0	0	1	0	+1	100.00
Czech Republic	3	3	0	0	13	2	+11	100.00
England	1	1	0	0	6	3	+3	100.00
Finland	3	1	0	2	3	6	−3	33.33
Hungary	1	0	0	1	1	3	−2	0.00
Italy	2	0	0	2	3	13	−10	0.00
Kazakhstan	1	1	0	0	6	0	+6	100.00
Latvia	1	1	0	0	6	0	+6	100.00
Moldova	1	1	0	0	8	0	+8	100.00
Northern Ireland	2	2	0	0	6	2	+4	100.00
Poland	4	2	1	1	6	6	±0	50.00
Portugal	3	0	0	3	0	14	−14	0.00
Russia	1	0	0	1	1	2	−1	0.00
Serbia	1	1	0	0	5	2	+3	100.00
Spain	3	0	0	3	4	22	−18	0.00
Sweden	1	0	0	1	4	5	−1	0.00
Ukraine	1	0	0	1	2	5	−3	0.00
Total	50	30	4	16	174	114	+60	61.70

== See also ==
- Futsal in the Netherlands
- Netherlands women's national football team
