= Lithuania women's national futsal team =

Lithuania
- Association: Lithuanian Football Federation
- Confederation: UEFA (Europe)
- Head coach: Donatas Gražulis
- FIFA code: LTU
- FIFA ranking: 79 ▼8 (8 May 2026)
- Highest FIFA ranking: 68 (May 2024)
- Lowest FIFA ranking: 71 (October 2024)
Home colours	Away colours

First international
- Belarus 1–0 Lithuania (Grodno, Belarus; 24 April 2018)

Biggest defeat
- Italy 11–0 Lithuania (Vrnjačka Banja, Serbia; 15 October 2024)

The Lithuania women's national futsal team (Lithuanian: Lietuvos Moterų futsal rinktinė) represents Lithuania in international futsal competitions and is governed by the Lithuanian Football Federation (LFF).

== History ==
The Lithuania women's national futsal team made its first appearance in 2007 when a team affiliated with the European Union of Futsal (UEFS) participated in the 2007 UEFS Futsal Women's Championship, held in Luhačovice, Czech Republic. The team struggled in the competition, conceding 63 goals across four matches.

In 2018, the Lithuanian Football Federation officially established a women's futsal team to compete in the newly introduced UEFA Women's Futsal Championship. The team played its first international matches in April 2018, traveling to Belarus for a two-game series against the hosts. Lithuania lost its inaugural match 1–0 on 24 April before suffering a 7–0 defeat in the second game.

Later that year, Lithuania made its competitive debut in the UEFA Women's Futsal Euro 2019 qualification, entering at the preliminary round. The team lost its opening match by a 10-goal margin but managed to secure a draw against Slovakia in its second game, ultimately failing to progress beyond the preliminary stage. The team experienced the same outcome in the next two editions of the competition.

Following the introduction of the FIFA Futsal Women's World Cup in 2023, Lithuania entered the qualification process for the inaugural 2025 edition. In October 2024, the team competed in its first World Cup qualifying mini-tournament but was eliminated after losing all its matches.

== Results and fixtures ==
The following is a list of match results in the last 12 months, as well as any future matches that have been scheduled.
Legend

Win Draw Lose Fixture

=== 2024 ===
23 March Friendly	Lithuania	1–6	Latvia	Birštonas, Lithuania
13:00 UTC+2		Report	Stolipina 3'; Ovsjankina 14' (2pen.); Paidere 19', 21', 27'; Pelse 21'	Stadium: Birštono arena Attendance: 100; Referee: D. Norkus, L. Skladaitytė (LTU)

24 March Friendly	Lithuania	1–3	Latvia	Birštonas, Lithuania
13:00 UTC+2		Report	Pelse 11'; Paidere 11'; Own goal 31'	Stadium: Birštono arena Attendance: 100; Referee: D. Norkus, L. Skladaitytė (LTU)

15 October 2025 FIFA World Cup qualifying	Italy	11–0	Lithuania	Vrnjačka Banja, Serbia

16 October 2025 FIFA World Cup qualifying	Serbia	6–0	Lithuania	Vrnjačka Banja, Serbia

16 October 2025 FIFA World Cup qualifying	Lithuania	1–3	Croatia	Vrnjačka Banja, Serbia

== Players ==
=== Current squad ===
The following 14 players have been called up for the 2025 FIFA World Cup qualifying mini-tournament hosted in Serbia from 16 to 19 October 2024.

No.	Pos.	Player	Date of birth (age)	Club
12	GK	Karolina Curukova	29 December 1996 (age 29)	(Lithuanian Football Federation) FK Banga Gargždai
22	GK	Viktorija Laksaitė	8 February 2001 (age 25)	(Lithuanian Football Federation) FK Mamukai
9	DF	Jorūnė Lipkinaitė	9 July 1995 (age 30)	(Lithuanian Football Federation) FA Šiauliai
13	DF	Evelina Buividavičiūtė	22 March 1998 (age 28)	(Lithuanian Football Federation) FA Šiauliai
16	DF	Deimantė Griesiūtė	13 August 1999 (age 26)	(Lithuanian Football Federation) FK Jonava
2	FW	Remigija Sableviciute	2 October 1992 (age 33)	(Lithuanian Football Federation) FA Šiauliai
3	FW	Vismantė Čereškaitė	20 July 1998 (age 27)	(Lithuanian Football Federation) MFA Žalgiris-MRU
8	FW	Gabrielė Ragauskaitė	11 August 2001 (age 24)	(Lithuanian Football Federation) FK Jonava
10	FW	Justina Baltrūnaitė	10 January 1999 (age 27)	(Lithuanian Football Federation) FK Jonava
11	FW	Paulina Potapova	5 October 1999 (age 26)	(Lithuanian Football Federation) FK Jonava
15	FW	Monika Akelyte	27 April 1994 (age 32)	(Lithuanian Football Federation) Marijampolės FC
18	FW	Vesta Ilgūnaitė	4 October 1993 (age 32)	(Lithuanian Football Federation) FK Ekranas
19	FW	Barbara Antonovič	20 July 1996 (age 29)	(Lithuanian Football Federation) MFA Žalgiris-MRU
20	FW	Karolina Zabolotnaja	17 February 1998 (age 28)	(Lithuanian Football Federation) FK Jonava

== Competitive record ==
=== FIFA Futsal Women's World Cup ===
FIFA Futsal Women's World Cup record								Qualification record					
Year	Position	Pld	W	D*	L	GF	GA	Pld	W	D*	L	GF	GA
(Philippines) 2025	Did not qualify							3	0	0	3	1	20
Total	0/1	—	—	—	—	—	—	3	0	0	3	1	20

*Draws include knockout matches decided on penalty kicks.

=== UEFA Women's Futsal Championship ===
UEFA Women's Futsal Championship record								Qualifying record					
Year	Position	Pld	W	D*	L	GF	GA	Pld	W	D*	L	GF	GA
(Portugal) 2019	Did not qualify							2	0	1	1	1	11
(Portugal) 2022	Did not qualify							3	0	0	3	1	18
(Hungary) 2023	Did not qualify							3	0	1	2	2	16
(Croatia) 2027	Did not qualify							3	0	0	3	1	12
Total	0/4	—	—	—	—	—	—	11	0	2	9	5	57

*Draws include knockout matches decided on penalty kicks.

== Head-to-head record ==
As of 21 March 2026
Key

Positive balance (more wins than losses)
Neutral balance (as many wins as losses)
Negative balance (more losses than wins)

The following table shows the Lithuania' all-time official international record per opponent:

Opponent	Pld	W	D	L	GF	GA	GD	W%
Belarus	2	0	0	2	0	8	−8	00.00
Bosnia and Herzegovina	2	0	0	2	3	10	−7	00.00
Croatia	1	0	0	1	1	3	−2	00.00
England	1	0	0	1	0	4	−4	00.00
Finland	1	0	0	1	0	10	−10	00.00
Italy	1	0	0	1	0	11	−11	00.00
Kazakhstan	1	0	1	0	0	0	±0	00.00
Latvia	4	0	1	3	3	12	−9	00.00
Northern Ireland	1	0	0	1	0	1	−1	00.00
Serbia	3	0	0	3	1	21	−20	00.00
Slovakia	2	0	1	1	1	8	−7	00.00
Slovenia	1	0	0	1	0	9	−9	00.00
Total	20	0	3	17	9	97	−88	00.00

== See also ==
- Lithuania women's national football team
