= 2025 FIFA Futsal Women's World Cup qualification (UEFA) =

Tournament details
- Host country: Main round: Group 1: Serbia; Group 2: Bosnia and Herzegovina; Group 3: Czech Republic; Group 4: Moldova; Elite round: France and Italy
- Dates: 15 October 2024 – 23 March 2025
- Teams: 25 (from 1 confederation)

Tournament statistics
- Matches played: 41
- Goals scored: 274 (6.68 per match)
- Attendance: 5,329 (130 per match)
- Top scorer(s): (Italy) Renata Adamatti (Italy) Sara Boutimah (7 goals each)
- All statistics correct as of 20 March 2025.

The European qualifying competition for the 2025 FIFA Futsal Women's World Cup was the women's futsal competition that determined the four UEFA teams in the 2025 FIFA Futsal Women's World Cup in the Philippines.

== Format ==
The qualifying competition consists of two stages:

- Main round: The 23 teams (excluding top seeds Portugal and Spain) are divided into five groups of four and one group of three. The group winners advance to the elite round, where they will be joined by the two highest-ranked teams, who received byes.
- Elite round: The eight teams, including Portugal and Spain, are drawn into two groups of four. The top two in each group qualify for the World Cup.

== Teams ==
A total of 25 (out of 55) UEFA member national teams entered the qualifying competition, with England, France and Norway making their competitive debuts. The teams were seeded based on their Women's Futsal National Team Coefficient ranking. The two highest-ranked teams advanced directly to the elite round, while the remaining teams entered the main round.

Bye to elite round
Pos.	Team	Coeff.
1	Spain	29.500
2	Portugal	22.500

Teams entering main round

Pos.	Team	Coeff.	Seed
3	Ukraine	19.334	1
4	Hungary	11.667	1
5	Italy	7.000	1
6	Finland	6.333	1
7	Poland	6.000	1
8	**Sweden**	5.667	1
9	Croatia	5.000	2
10	Netherlands	4.500	2
11	**Czechia**	4.000	2
12	Belarus	3.750	2
13	Belgium	3.708	2
14	Slovenia	3.667	2

Pos.	Team	Coeff.	Seed
15	Slovakia	3.500	3
16	**Bosnia and Herzegovina**	2.333	3
17	**Serbia**	2.333	3
18	**Kazakhstan**	1.167	3
19	Northern Ireland	0.667	3
20	**Moldova**	0.417	3
21	Lithuania	0.417	4
22	Latvia	0.000	4
23	England	0.000	4
24	France	0.000	4
25	Norway	0.000	4

Did not enter
Team	Coeff.
Armenia	1.167
Romania	1.000
Gibraltar	0.667

Banned
Team
Russia

Notes

- Teams marked in **bold** are the mini-tournament hosts.

== Schedule ==
The qualifying matches are scheduled on dates within the FIFA Futsal International Match Calendar.

Schedule for 2025 FIFA Futsal Women's World Cup European qualifying
Round	Draw	Dates
Main round	30 May 2024	15–19 October 2024
Elite round	31 October 2024	19–22 March 2025

== Main round ==
The winners of each group will advance to the elite round, where they will join Spain and Portugal, who receive byes.

Times are CEST (UTC+2), as listed by UEFA (local times, if different, are in parentheses).

=== Group 1 ===
Pos	Team	Pld	W	D	L	GF	GA	GD	Pts	Qualification
1	Italy	3	3	0	0	27	0	+27	9	Elite round
2	Croatia	3	2	0	1	11	5	+6	6	
3	Serbia (H)	3	1	0	2	6	20	−14	3	
4	Lithuania	3	0	0	3	1	20	−19	0	

Source: UEFA
Rules for classification: Tiebreakers
(H) Hosts
15 October 2024
16:00

Croatia	8–0	Serbia
Lucić 7'34", 14'06", 25'54"; Žagar 14'48"; Novak 24'22"; Petarić 29'19", 39'29"; Matijevic 33'39"	Report

Sports Hall "VLADE DIVAC", Vrnjačka Banja
Attendance: 51
Referee: Admir Zahovič (SVN)
Noelia Gutierrez Muñoz (ESP)
Larisa Eleni Avramidou (GRE)
15 October 2024
19:00

Italy	11–0	Lithuania
Borges Da Silva 3'38"; Mansueto 9'15", 25'42"; Dal Maz 16'54"; Boutimah 21'36", 32'56", 33'31", 38'18"; Berte' 22'51"; Adamatti 32'00"; Ferrara 40'24"	Report

Sports Hall "VLADE DIVAC", Vrnjačka Banja
Attendance: 42
Referee: Marco Rothenfluh (SUI)
Larisa Eleni Avramidou (GRE)
Noelia Gutierrez Muñoz (ESP)

16 October 2024
16:00

Croatia	0–4	Italy
	Report	Borges Da Silva 3'49"; Berte' 4'34"; Boutimah 23'51"; Mansueto 38'13"

Sports Hall "VLADE DIVAC", Vrnjačka Banja
Attendance: 39
Referee: Larisa Eleni Avramidou (GRE)
Admir Zahovič (SVN)
Marco Rothenfluh (SUI)
16 October 2024
19:00

Serbia	6–0	Lithuania
Trbojević 1'34", 4'10"; Maksimović 6'32"; Vukovic 27'20"; Marenić 29'04", 29'59"	Report

Sports Hall "VLADE DIVAC", Vrnjačka Banja
Attendance: 65
Referee: Noelia Gutierrez Muñoz (ESP)
Marco Rothenfluh (SUI)
Admir Zahovič (SVN)

18 October 2024
16:00

Lithuania	1–3	Croatia
Potapova 2'51"	Report	Slavica 2'39"; Matijevic 5'13"; Curukova 36'38" (o.g.)

Sports Hall "VLADE DIVAC", Vrnjačka Banja
Attendance: 35
Referee: Noelia Gutierrez Muñoz (ESP)
Larisa Eleni Avramidou (GRE)
Admir Zahovič (SVN)
18 October 2024
19:00

Serbia	0–12	Italy
	Report	Adamatti 2'35", 30'27", 32'08"; Berte' 4'50", 26'44"; Grieco 7'45", 9'38", 15'04"; Borges Da Silva 21'37"; Boutimah 23'24"; Ferrara 28'41", 37'39"

Sports Hall "VLADE DIVAC", Vrnjačka Banja
Attendance: 65
Referee: Admir Zahovič (SVN)
Marco Rothenfluh (SUI)
Larisa Eleni Avramidou (GRE)

=== Group 2 ===
Pos	Team	Pld	W	D	L	GF	GA	GD	Pts	Qualification
1	Hungary	3	2	1	0	9	2	+7	7	Elite round
2	Norway	3	2	0	1	9	6	+3	6	
3	Bosnia and Herzegovina (H)	3	1	1	1	9	7	+2	4	
4	Belarus	3	0	0	3	5	17	−12	0	

Source: UEFA
Rules for classification: Tiebreakers
(H) Hosts
16 October 2024
16:00

Belarus	4–7	Bosnia and Herzegovina
Sidorchuk 20'03", 21'31"; Kharitonchik 23'37"; Duben 39'29"	Report	Ćesko 6'42", 39'51"; Vujadin 7'35", 20'45"; Mujanović 16'18"; Piskić 17'42"; Kamerić 25'11"

Sports Hall East Sarajevo, Sarajevo
Attendance: 70
Referee: Daniele D'adamo (SMR)
Alice Vévodvá (CZE)
Zviad Bliadze (GEO)
16 October 2024
20:00

Hungary	3–2	Norway
Tagyi 18'20"; C. Krascsenics 21'44", 35'29"	Report	Sandtrøen 6'50"; Vik 16'43" (pen.)

Sports Hall East Sarajevo, Sarajevo
Attendance: 50
Referee: Filipe Gonçalo Santos Duarte (POR)
Zviad Bliadze (GEO)
Alice Vévodvá (CZE)

17 October 2024
16:00

Belarus	0–6	Hungary
	Report	C. Krascsenics 2'29", 9'09"; Gajzágó 12'23", 31'33"; Fábián 16'21"; Hardon 39'12"

Sports Hall East Sarajevo, Sarajevo
Attendance: 30
Referee: Zviad Bliadze (GEO)
Daniele D'adamo (SMR)
Filipe Gonçalo Santos Duarte (POR)
17 October 2024
20:00

Bosnia and Herzegovina	2–3	Norway
Meyer 14'16" (o.g.); Vujadin 39'51" (pen.)	Report	Meyer 6'00"; Vik 12'51"; Halgunset 18'30"

Sports Hall East Sarajevo, Sarajevo
Attendance: 30
Referee: Alice Vévodvá (CZE)
Filipe Gonçalo Santos Duarte (POR)
Daniele D'adamo (SMR)

19 October 2024
16:00

Bosnia and Herzegovina	0–0	Hungary
	Report

Sports Hall East Sarajevo, Sarajevo
Attendance: 50
Referee: Filipe Gonçalo Santos Duarte (POR)
Daniele D'adamo (SMR)
Zviad Bliadze (GEO)
19 October 2024
20:00

Norway	4–1	Belarus
Van Der Weel 11'31"; Halgunset 12'37" (pen.), 16'31" (pen.); Meyer 32'51"	Report	Igrusha 10'23"

Sports Hall East Sarajevo, Sarajevo
Attendance: 50
Referee: Alice Vévodvá (CZE)
Zviad Bliadze (GEO)
Daniele D'adamo (SMR)

=== Group 3 ===
Pos	Team	Pld	W	D	L	GF	GA	GD	Pts	Qualification
1	France	3	2	1	0	10	5	+5	7	Elite round
2	Ukraine	3	2	0	1	11	4	+7	6	
3	Czech Republic (H)	3	1	1	1	9	6	+3	4	
4	Northern Ireland	3	0	0	3	2	17	−15	0	

Source: UEFA
Rules for classification: Tiebreakers
(H) Hosts
16 October 2024
16:00

Ukraine	1–3	France
Volovenko 23'21"	Report	Alberbide 7'28"; Atamaniuk 16'00"; Bitterlin 39'40"

Sportovní hala Teplice, Teplice
Attendance: 40
Referee: Josip Barton (MKD)
Florentina Kallaba (KOS)
Martina Piccolo (ITA)
16 October 2024
19:00

Northern Ireland	0–6	Czech Republic
	Report	Skálová 5'05", 20'05", 33'04"; Vargová 15'38"; Soquessa 26'47", 37"50"

Sportovní hala Teplice, Teplice
Attendance: 283
Referee: Fatma Özlem Tursun (TUR)
Martina Piccolo (ITA)
Florentina Kallaba (KOS)

17 October 2024
16:00

Northern Ireland	0–6	Ukraine
	Report	Klipachenko 14'35"; Kovshyk 15'02", 22'46", 27'06", 37'20"; Burlachenko 33'15"

Sportovní hala Teplice, Teplice
Attendance: 100
Referee: Martina Piccolo (ITA)
Josip Barton (MKD)
Fatma Özlem Tursun (TUR)
17 October 2024
19:00

Czech Republic	2–2	France
Soušková 31'20"; Beštová 32'37"	Report	Pellegry 36'29"; Alberbide 37'21"

Sportovní hala Teplice, Teplice
Attendance: 321
Referee: Florentina Kallaba (KOS)
Fatma Özlem Tursun (TUR)
Josip Barton (MKD)

19 October 2024
16:00

France	5–2	Northern Ireland
Badr Bassem 6'07"; Pellegry 8'44"; Alberbide 18'25"; Boissinot 28'53"; Bitterlin 34'09"	Report	Dempster 26'23", 32'48"

Sportovní hala Teplice, Teplice
Attendance: 54
Referee: Florentina Kallaba (KOS)
Josip Barton (MKD)
Martina Piccolo (ITA)
19 October 2024
19:00

Czech Republic	1–4	Ukraine
Soušková 33'27"	Report	Klipachenko 4'39"; Kostiuk 8'34"; Dubytska 23'38"; Kovshyk 25'49"

Sportovní hala Teplice, Teplice
Attendance: 350
Referee: Fatma Özlem Tursun (TUR)
Martina Piccolo (ITA)
Josip Barton (MKD)

=== Group 4 ===
Pos	Team	Pld	W	D	L	GF	GA	GD	Pts	Qualification
1	Finland	3	3	0	0	21	2	+19	9	Elite round
2	Slovenia	3	2	0	1	11	6	+5	6	
3	England	3	1	0	2	12	9	+3	3	
4	Moldova (H)	3	0	0	3	0	27	−27	0	

Source: UEFA
Rules for classification: Tiebreakers
(H) Hosts
16 October 2024
14:00 (15:00 UTC+3)

Finland	5–2	England
Halonen 10'37"; Herranen 16'36", 27'48"; Viren 17'11"; Jokisalo 27'20"	Report	Halonen 20'40" (o.g.); Scotland 39'44"

FMF Futsal Arena, Ciorescu
Attendance: 40
Referee: Mariia Myslovska (UKR)
Jasmina Mickoska (SRB)
Filipa Prata (POR)
16 October 2024
17:00 (18:00 UTC+3)

Slovenia	7–0	Moldova
Adamič 8'30", 8'55"; Jesenovec 11'48", 31'00"; Šnofl 13'40"; Ines 15'56"; Caraman 28'31" (o.g.)	Report

FMF Futsal Arena, Ciorescu
Attendance: 80
Referee: Marijana Orešić (CRO)
Filipa Prata (POR)
Jasmina Mickoska (SRB)

17 October 2024
14:00 (15:00 UTC+3)

Slovenia	0–4	Finland
	Report	Jokisalo 3'09", 27'49"; Lind 23'19", 26'40"

FMF Futsal Arena, Ciorescu
Attendance: 10
Referee: Filipa Prata (POR)
Mariia Myslovska (UKR)
Marijana Orešić (CRO)
17 October 2024
17:00 (18:00 UTC+3)

Moldova	0–8	England
	Report	Gurr 4'40", 23'58"; Kural 8'40", 13'25"; Brennan 14'21", 32'14"; Miller 31'41"; Tobin 33'31"

FMF Futsal Arena, Ciorescu
Attendance: 50
Referee: Jasmina Mickoska (SRB)
Marijana Orešić (CRO)
Mariia Myslovska (UKR)

19 October 2024
14:00 (15:00 UTC+3)

England	2–4	Slovenia
Kural 5'52"; Gurr 37'34"	Report	Ines 14'49"; Tanšek 24'19"; Ložar 26'25"; Žvokelj 33'04"

FMF Futsal Arena, Ciorescu
Attendance: 40
Referee: Marijana Orešić (CRO)
Jasmina Mickoska (SRB)
Filipa Prata (POR)
19 October 2024
17:00 (18:00 UTC+3)

Moldova	0–12	Finland
	Report	Juntikka 1'01"; Mäntylä 5'53"; Viren 17'03", 20'39"; Herranen 18'01"; Hannula 25'08", 33'13"; Luotonen 28'51", 32'11"; Lind 34'18", 38'53"; Halonen 39'56"

FMF Futsal Arena, Ciorescu
Attendance: 110
Referee: Mariia Myslovska (UKR)
Filipa Prata (POR)
Jasmina Mickoska (SRB)

=== Group 5 ===
Pos	Team	Pld	W	D	L	GF	GA	GD	Pts	Qualification
1	Sweden (H)	3	3	0	0	24	5	+19	9	Elite round
2	Slovakia	3	2	0	1	14	9	+5	6	
3	Belgium	3	1	0	2	9	15	−6	3	
4	Latvia	3	0	0	3	1	19	−18	0	

Source: UEFA
Rules for classification: Tiebreakers
(H) Hosts
16 October 2024
14:00

Belgium	6–0	Latvia
Bougard 7'00"; Corbeels 22'55"; In 23'58"; Bakar 29'38"; Meyers 31'26"; Peeters 38'10"	Report

Estrad Alingsås, Alingsås
Attendance: 105
Referee: Julien Lang (FRA)
Roosa-Maria Karoliina Tuomi (FIN)
Panagiotis Ntalas (GRE)
16 October 2024
19:00

Slovakia	4–6	Sweden
Rybanská 18'53", 39'32" (pen.); Tyčiaková 27'19"; Jacenková 35'03"	Report	Glans 3'59"; Olsson 19'25"; Rolin 22'27"; Stegius 23'03"; Fors 37'46"; Aguilar 38'24"

Estrad Alingsås, Alingsås
Attendance: 324
Referee: Monika Czudzinowicz (POL)
Panagiotis Ntalas (GRE)
Roosa-Maria Karoliina Tuomi (FIN)

17 October 2024
14:00

Slovakia	4–2	Belgium
Chomová 15'35"; Macková 21'57"; Rybanská 25'07"; Tomčíková 31'32"	Report	In 5'54"; Bougard 25'49"

Estrad Alingsås, Alingsås
Attendance: 167
Referee: Panagiotis Ntalas (GRE)
Julien Lang (FRA)
Monika Czudzinowicz (POL)
17 October 2024
19:00

Sweden	7–0	Latvia
Stegius 1'52"; Glans 4'45"; Kiryo 15'14"; Jansson 16'59"; Rångemyr 35'35"; Gilkes 38'37", 38'48"	Report

Estrad Alingsås, Alingsås
Attendance: 386
Referee: Roosa-Maria Karoliina Tuomi (FIN)
Monika Czudzinowicz (POL)
Julien Lang (FRA)

19 October 2024
12:00

Latvia	1–6	Slovakia
Jakovele 27'43"	Report	Tyčiaková 10'52", 13'37"; Jacenková 20'59"; Jakovele 23'48" (o.g.); Rybanská 28'28"; Macková 38'24"

Estrad Alingsås, Alingsås
Attendance: 281
Referee: Julien Lang (FRA)
Monika Czudzinowicz (POL)
Panagiotis Ntalas (GRE)
19 October 2024
17:00

Sweden	11–1	Belgium
Lundström 1'17", 26'12"; Lindqvist 7'09"; Aguilar 16'02"; Rolin 22'23", 26'41", 36'35"; Rångemyr 29'19"; Kiryo 33'24", 39'25"; Stegius 37'24"	Report	Corbeels 25'19"

Estrad Alingsås, Alingsås
Attendance: 1,411
Referee: Roosa-Maria Karoliina Tuomi (FIN)
Panagiotis Ntalas (GRE)
Julien Lang (FRA)

=== Group 6 ===
Pos	Team	Pld	W	D	L	GF	GA	GD	Pts	Qualification
1	Poland	2	2	0	0	11	2	+9	6	Elite round
2	Netherlands	2	1	0	1	8	4	+4	3	
3	Kazakhstan (H)	2	0	0	2	0	13	−13	0	

Source: UEFA
Rules for classification: Tiebreakers
(H) Hosts
17 October 2024
14:00 (17:00 UTC+5)

Netherlands	6–0	Kazakhstan
Hand 4'35", 35'27"; Visser 10'59"; Dijkstra 16'36"; Van Den Boomgaard 35'52"; Reitsma 40'30"	Report

Sairan Arena, Astana
Attendance: 250
Referee: George Jansizian (SWE)
Elwyn Rhys Parry (WAL)
Annamaria Tolnay (HUN)

18 October 2024
14:00 (17:00 UTC+5)

Poland	4–2	Netherlands
Bała 8'25" (pen.); Szostak 27'42"; Szydełko 34'05"; Van Den Boomgaard 36'11" (o.g.)	Report	Hand 32'00"; Barendse 35'05"

Sairan Arena, Astana
Attendance: 100
Referee: Elwyn Rhys Parry (WAL)
Annamaria Tolnay (HUN)
George Jansizian (SWE)

19 October 2024
14:00 (17:00 UTC+5)

Kazakhstan	0–7	Poland
	Report	Szostak 3'08"; Sobkowicz 5'01", 15'27"; Fronczak 7'20", 30'06"; Bała 14'08" (pen.), 19'58"

Sairan Arena, Astana
Attendance: 250
Referee: Annamaria Tolnay (HUN)
George Jansizian (SWE)
Elwyn Rhys Parry (WAL)

== Elite round ==
=== Qualified teams ===
The top two in each group qualify for the finals.

Teams that received a bye to this round

- Spain
- Portugal

Teams qualified from the main round

Group	Winners	Group	Winners
1	Italy	4	Finland
2	Hungary	5	Sweden
3	France	6	Poland

=== Draw ===
The draw for the Elite round took place on 31 October, 2024. Pot 1 consisted of the two host countries (which were drawn into position 2 of the two groups), Pot 3 consisted of the two teams which received a bye to this round. They were drawn into position 1 of either group.

Pot 1	Pot 2	Pot 3
France; Italy	Finland; Hungary; Poland; Sweden	Spain; Portugal

=== Result ===
Times are CET (UTC+1), as listed by UEFA (local times, if different, are in parentheses).

==== Group A ====
Pos	Team	Pld	W	D	L	GF	GA	GD	Pts	Qualification
1	Portugal	3	3	0	0	21	1	+20	9	Final tournament
2	Italy (H)	3	2	0	1	11	9	+2	6	Final tournament
3	Sweden	3	0	1	2	6	16	−10	1	
4	Hungary	3	0	1	2	4	16	−12	1	

Source: UEFA
Rules for classification: Tiebreakers
(H) Hosts
19 March 2025
16:00

Hungary	1–6	Italy
Horváth 25'05" (pen.)	Report	Adamatti 2'26", 32'40"; Fülöp 13'48" (o.g.); Ghilardi 19'41"; Dal Maz 28'07", 32'15"

Palaroma, Montesilvano
Attendance: 400
Referee: Marijana Orešić (CRO)
Alice Vévodová (CZE)
Florentina Kallaba (KOS)
19 March 2025
19:00

Portugal	9–0	Sweden
Maria 3'09"; Fifó 3'58", 24'04", 24'37"; Kika 17'34"; Ana Azevedo 21'34"; Fors 27'12" (o.g.); Janice Silva 31'07"; Lídia Moreira 39'32"	Report

Palaroma, Montesilvano
Attendance: 100
Referee: Mariia Myslovska (UKR)
Florentina Kallaba (KOS)
Alice Vévodová (CZE)

20 March 2025
16:00

Hungary	1–8	Portugal
Fábián 19'57"	Report	Fifó 1'35", 25'46"; Maria 16'00", 16'37", 31'00"; Kika 19'27", 22'03"; Janice Silva 24'58"

Palaroma, Montesilvano
Attendance: 70
Referee: Alice Vévodová (CZE)
Marijana Orešić (CRO)
Mariia Myslovska (UKR)
20 March 2025
19:00

Italy	5–4	Sweden
Boutimah 0'32"; Ferrara 3'24"; Mansueto 16'32"; Berte' 24'38"; Adamatti 38'07"	Report	Fors 17'55", 22'36"; Adamatti 24'15" (o.g.); Kiryo 38'18"

Palaroma, Montesilvano
Attendance: 700
Referee: Florentina Kallaba (KOS)
Mariia Myslovska (UKR)
Marijana Orešić (CRO)

22 March 2025
16:00

Sweden	2–2	Hungary
Stegius 23'35"; Hardon 24'25" (o.g.)	Report	Fülöp 21'47"; Horváth 27'39"

Palaroma, Montesilvano
Attendance: 110
Referee: Mariia Myslovska (UKR)
Florentina Kallaba (KOS)
Alice Vévodová (CZE)
22 March 2025
19:00

Italy	0–4	Portugal
	Report	Ana Azevedo 3'42"; Janice Silva 3'53"; Fifó 19'34"; Carol 38'36"

Palaroma, Montesilvano
Referee: Marijana Orešić (CRO)
Alice Vévodová (CZE)
Florentina Kallaba (KOS)

==== Group B ====
Pos	Team	Pld	W	D	L	GF	GA	GD	Pts	Qualification
1	Spain	3	3	0	0	13	2	+11	9	Final tournament
2	Poland	3	1	1	1	8	9	−1	4	Final tournament
3	Finland	3	1	1	1	4	7	−3	4	
4	France (H)	3	0	0	3	5	12	−7	0	

Source: UEFA
Rules for classification: Tiebreakers
(H) Hosts
19 March 2025
15:00

Spain	4–0	Finland
Irene Córdoba 1'16"; María Sanz 21'30"; Antía 29'39", 35'08"	Report

Palais des sports Ghani-Yalouz, Besançon
Attendance: 381
Referee: Fatma Özlem Tursun (TUR)
Larisa Eleni Avramidou (GRE)
Emilie Aubry (SUI)
19 March 2025
18:00

Poland	6–2	France
Sobkowicz 5'16", 5'30"; Fronczak 13'20"; Włodarczyk 14'00"; Tracz 14'30"; Szostak 25'54"	Report	Pellegry 18'28"; Closset 21'53"

Palais des sports Ghani-Yalouz, Besançon
Attendance: 1,516
Referee: Annamaria Tolnay (HUN)
Emilie Aubry (SUI)
Larisa Eleni Avramidou (GRE)

20 March 2025
17:00

Poland	0–5	Spain
	Report	Peque 2'10"; Laura Córdoba 7'08", 7'18"; Antia 19'59"; Ale de Paz 35'23"

Palais des sports Ghani-Yalouz, Besançon
Attendance: 114
Referee: Emilie Aubry (SUI)
Annamaria Tolnay (HUN)
Fatma Özlem Tursun (TUR)
20 March 2025
20:00

France	1–2	Finland
Pellegry 27'33"	Report	Viren 11'37"; Halonen 13'04"

Palais des sports Ghani-Yalouz, Besançon
Attendance: 895
Referee: Larisa Eleni Avramidou (GRE)
Fatma Özlem Tursun (TUR)
Annamaria Tolnay (HUN)

22 March 2025
15:00

Finland	2–2	Poland
Jokisalo 25'08"; Herranen 35'34"	Report	Bała 11'42" (pen.), 39'43"

Palais des sports Ghani-Yalouz, Besançon
Attendance: 257
Referee: Annamaria Tolnay (HUN)
Emilie Aubry (SUI)
Larisa Eleni Avramidou (CYP)
22 March 2025
18:00

France	2–4	Spain
Atamaniuk 26'42"; La Posta 28'05"	Report	Ana Luján 1'49"; Irene Córdoba 2'13"; María Sanz 6'32", 16'58"

Palais des sports Ghani-Yalouz, Besançon
Referee: Fatma Özlem Tursun (TUR)
Larisa Eleni Avramidou (CYP)
Emilie Aubry (SUI)

== Qualified teams for FIFA Futsal Women's World Cup ==
The following four teams from UEFA qualified for the 2025 FIFA Futsal Women's World Cup.

Team	Qualified as	Qualified on
Portugal	Elite round Group A winners	20 March 2025
Italy	Elite round Group A runners-up	20 March 2025
Spain	Elite round Group B winners	20 March 2025
Poland	Elite round Group B runners-up	22 March 2025
