= Bosnia and Herzegovina women's national futsal team =

Bosnia and Herzeogivna
- Nickname(s): Futsal Zmajice (Futsal Female Dragon)
- Association: Football Association of Bosnia and Herzegovina
- Confederation: UEFA (Europe)
- Head coach: Nijaz Mulahmetović
- Captain: Nikolina Vujadin
- FIFA code: BIH
- FIFA ranking: 39 (24 September 2026)
- Highest FIFA ranking: 44 (October 2024)
- Lowest FIFA ranking: 45 (May 2024)
| Home colours | Away colours |

First international
- Slovenia 2–3 Bosnia and Herzegovina (Maribor, Slovenia; 5 June 2021)

Biggest win
- Bosnia and Herzegovina 11–4 Kazakhstan (Prienai, Lithuania; 14 May 2022)

Biggest defeat
- Netherlands 7–3 Bosnia and Herzegovina (Ciorescu, Moldova; 16 August 2021)

The Bosnia and Herzegovina women's national futsal team (Bosnian: Ženska futsal reprezentacija Bosne i Hercegovine) represents Bosnia and Herzegovina in international futsal competitions and is controlled by the Football Association of Bosnia and Herzegovina, the governing body for futsal in the country.

== History ==
Established in 2020, the team's first camp was delayed until June 2021 due to the COVID-19 pandemic. On 5 June 2021, the team played its first international game against Slovenia in Maribor, winning 3–2. Missing the inaugural edition of the UEFA Women's Futsal Championship, Bosnia entered the 2022 edition Preliminary round. winning one match out of three, the team failed to qualify for the main round in their first attempt. in their second attempt, the Bosnian side qualified for the main round, winning two of their 3 matches, including an 11–4 win against Kazakhstan. In the main round, the team secured two wins but failed to qualify for the final tournament.

After the establishment of the FIFA Women's Futsal World Cup in 2024, Bosnia participated in the inaugural European qualifiers, hosting Group 2. However, the team failed to reach the main round after a loss to Norway.

== Results and fixtures ==
The following is a list of match results in the last 12 months, as well as any future matches that have been scheduled.

Legend

Win Draw Lose Fixture

=== 2024 ===
| 16 October 2025 FIFA World Cup qualifying | Belarus | 4–7 | Bosnia and Herzegovina | Sarajevo |
| 16:00 UTC+1 | Sidorchuk 20'03", 21'31"; Kharitonchik 23'37"; Duben 39'29" | Report | Ćesko 6'42", 39'51"; Vujadin 7'35", 20'45"; Mujanović 16'18"; Piskić 17'42"; Kamerić 25'11" | Stadium: Sports Hall East Sarajevo; Attendance: 70; Referee: Daniele D'adamo (SMR); Alice Vévodvá (CZE) |

| 17 October 2025 FIFA World Cup qualifying | Bosnia and Herzegovina | 2–3 | Norway | Sarajevo |
| 20:00 UTC+1 | Meyer 14'16" (o.g.); Vujadin 39'51" (pen.) | Report | Meyer 6'00"; Vik 12'51"; Halgunset 18'30" | Stadium: Sports Hall East Sarajevo; Attendance: 30; Referee: Alice Vévodvá (CZE); Filipe Gonçalo Santos Duarte (POR) |

| 19 October 2025 FIFA World Cup qualifying | Bosnia and Herzegovina | 0–0 | Hungary | Sarajevo |
| 16:00 UTC+1 | | Report | | Stadium: Sports Hall East Sarajevo; Attendance: 50; Referee: Filipe Gonçalo Santos Duarte (POR); Daniele D'adamo (SMR) |

== Coaching staff ==
=== Current coaching staff ===
| Position | Name |
|---|---|
| Head coach | (Bosnia and Herzegovina) Nijaz Mulahmetović |
| Assistant coaches | (Bosnia and Herzegovina) Nikša Gligić |
| Goalkeeping coach | (Bosnia and Herzegovina) Antonio Vidović |

=== Managerial history ===
- (Bosnia and Herzegovina) Nijaz Mulahmetović (2021)
- (Bosnia and Herzegovina) Mirko Campara (2022)
- (Bosnia and Herzegovina) Nijaz Mulahmetović (2024)

== Players ==
=== Current squad ===
The following 14 players were named in the squad for the 2025 FIFA World Cup qualifying matches against Belarus, Hungary and Norway on 16, 17 and 19 October 2024, respectively.
Caps and goals correct as of 19 October after the game against Hungary

| No. | Pos. | Player | Date of birth (age) | Club |
|---|---|---|---|---|
| 1 | GK | Nikolina Todorić | 27 August 2000 (age 26) | (Football Association of Bosnia and Herzegovina) ŽNK Iskra |
| 12 | GK | Iman Šljivo | 4 January 2001 (age 25) | (Romanian Football Federation) FCU Olimpia Cluj |
| 2 | DF | Alma Kamerić | 17 June 1996 (age 30) | (Football Association of Bosnia and Herzegovina) SFK 2000 |
| 3 | DF | Ajla Zukić | 28 April 2001 (age 25) | (Football Association of Bosnia and Herzegovina) SFK 2000 |
| 4 | DF | Lorena Terzić | 4 August 2006 (age 20) | (Football Association of Bosnia and Herzegovina) ŽFK Radnik Bumerang |
| 5 | DF | Zerina Piskić | 16 August 1997 (age 29) | (Football Association of Bosnia and Herzegovina) SFK 2000 |
| 6 | DF | Vesna Njeguš | 18 April 1993 (age 33) | (Football Association of Bosnia and Herzegovina) ŽFK Radnik Bumerang |
| 7 | DF | Arijana Ćesko | 28 August 2002 (age 24) | (Swedish Football Association) FC Örebro |
| 8 | DF | Merima Alibašić | 10 July 1996 (age 30) | (Swedish Football Association) FC Rosengård |
| 10 | DF | Nikolina Vujadin | 3 November 1995 (age 30) | (Football Association of Bosnia and Herzegovina) SFK 2000 |
| 11 | DF | Selma Hasić | 5 September 2002 (age 24) | (Football Association of Bosnia and Herzegovina) ŽFK Radnik Bumerang |
| 13 | DF | Jovana Novaković | 1 August 2006 (age 20) | (Football Association of Bosnia and Herzegovina) ŽFK Radnik Bumerang |
| 14 | DF | Lamija Oštraković | 4 November 2005 (age 20) | (Football Association of Bosnia and Herzegovina) ŽFK Sloboda |
| 9 | FW | Amina Mujanović | 11 August 1994 (age 32) | (Football Association of Bosnia and Herzegovina) ŽFK Radnik Bumerang |

== Competitive record ==
=== FIFA Futsal Women's World Cup ===
| FIFA Futsal Women's World Cup record | | | | | | | | | Qualification record | | | | | |
| Year | Round | Position | Pld | W | D* | L | GF | GA | Pld | W | D* | L | GF | GA |
| (Philippines) 2025 | Did not qualify | | | | | | | | 3 | 1 | 1 | 1 | 9 | 7 |
| Total | Best: — | 0/1 | — | — | — | — | — | — | 3 | 1 | 1 | 1 | 9 | 7 |

*Draws include knockout matches decided on penalty kicks.

=== UEFA Women's Futsal Championship ===
| UEFA Women's Futsal Championship record | | | | | | | | | Qualifying record | | | | | |
| Year | Round | Position | Pld | W | D* | L | GF | GA | Pld | W | D* | L | GF | GA |
| (Portugal) 2019 | Did not enter | | | | | | | | Did not enter | | | | | |
| (Portugal) 2022 | Did not qualify | | | | | | | | 3 | 1 | 0 | 2 | 8 | 11 |
| (Hungary) 2023 | Did not qualify | | | | | | | | 6 | 4 | 0 | 2 | 25 | 14 |
| (Croatia) 2027 | Did not qualify | | | | | | | | 6 | 2 | 1 | 3 | 9 | 13 |
| Total | Best: | 0/3 | — | — | — | — | — | — | 15 | 7 | 1 | 7 | 42 | 38 |

*Draws include knockout matches decided on penalty kicks.

== See also ==
- Bosnia and Herzegovina women's national football team
