= Moldova women's national futsal team =

Moldova
- Association: Moldovan Football Federation
- Confederation: UEFA (Europe)
- Head coach: Oleg Petrov
- Captain: Bianca Druță
- FIFA code: MDA
- FIFA ranking: 71 ▲1 (8 May 2026)
- Highest FIFA ranking: 64 (May–October 2024)
- Lowest FIFA ranking: 64 (May–October 2024)
Home colours	Away colours

First international
- Belarus 3–1 Moldova (Gomel, Belarus; 22 June 2018)

Biggest defeat
- Italy 13–1 Moldova (Varaždin, Croatia; 27 June 2019); Moldova 0–12 Finland (Ciorescu, Moldova; 19 October 2024)

The Moldova women's national futsal team (Romanian: Echipa națională de futsal feminin a Moldovei, Russian: Национальная женская футзальная сборная Молдовы) represents Moldova in international futsal competitions and is controlled by the Moldovan Football Federation (FMF).

== History ==
Moldova's women's team was established following the introduction of the UEFA Women's Futsal Championship in 2018. The team entered its first qualification campaign for the tournament that year. On 22 June 2018, Moldova played its first international match, a 1–3 defeat against Belarus. In August 2018, the country hosted the preliminary round of the UEFA Women's Futsal Euro 2019 but was eliminated after losing the opening match and drawing the second. In June 2019, Moldova participated in its first international tournament, the Futsal Week Tournament in Varaždin, Croatia, where it finished last after losing all three matches.

== Results and fixtures ==
- The following is a list of match results in the last 12 months, as well as any future matches that have been scheduled.

Legend

Win Draw Lose Fixture

=== 2024 ===
16 October 2025 FIFA World Cup qualificiation	Slovenia	7–0	Moldova	Ciorescu, Moldova

17 October 2025 FIFA World Cup qualificiation	Moldova	0–8	England	Ciorescu, Moldova

19 October 2025 FIFA World Cup qualificiation	Moldova	0–12	Finland	Ciorescu, Moldova

== Players ==
=== Current squad ===
The following players were called up for the three 2025 FIFA World Cup qualifying matches in Ciorescu, from 16 to 19 October 2024.

No.	Pos.	Player	Date of birth (age)	Club
1	GK	Bianca Druță	6 March 2001 (age 25)	(Moldovan Football Federation) CSF Agarista Anenii Noi
12	GK	Anastasia Nagoreanschi	11 October 2005 (age 20)	(Moldovan Football Federation) CSF Agarista Anenii Noi
2	DF	Simona Meleca	1 July 2008 (age 17)	(Moldovan Football Federation) CSF Agarista Anenii Noi
4	DF	Diana Loghin	23 April 1997 (age 29)	(Moldovan Football Federation) Nistru Cioburciu
11	DF	Adelina Cojocari	17 July 2005 (age 20)	(Moldovan Football Federation) Real Succes
14	DF	Alina Brînza	9 August 2003 (age 22)	(Moldovan Football Federation) CSF Agarista Anenii Noi
3	FW	Alina Chirica	9 April 2004 (age 22)	(Moldovan Football Federation) CSF Agarista Anenii Noi
5	FW	Corina Vasilache	8 June 2008 (age 17)	(Moldovan Football Federation) CSF Agarista Anenii Noi
7	FW	Ludmila Caraman	27 July 1985 (age 40)	(Moldovan Football Federation) CSF Agarista Anenii Noi
8	FW	Alexandra Drumea	23 April 2003 (age 23)	(Moldovan Football Federation) Real Succes
9	FW	Tatiana Balaban	26 May 2007 (age 19)	(Moldovan Football Federation) CSF Agarista Anenii Noi
10	FW	Roxana Moisiuc	8 May 2005 (age 21)	(Moldovan Football Federation) CSF Agarista Anenii Noi
13	FW	Alexandra Osadcii	26 January 2004 (age 22)	(Moldovan Football Federation) CSF Agarista Anenii Noi

== Competitive record ==
=== FIFA Futsal Women's World Cup ===
FIFA Futsal Women's World Cup record								Qualification record					
Year	Position	Pld	W	D*	L	GF	GA	Pld	W	D*	L	GF	GA
(Philippines) 2025	Did not qualify							3	0	0	3	0	27
Total	0/1	—	—	—	—	—	—	3	0	0	3	0	27

*Draws include knockout matches decided on penalty kicks.

=== UEFA Women's Futsal Championship ===
UEFA Women's Futsal Championship record								Qualifying record					
Year	Position	Pld	W	D*	L	GF	GA	Pld	W	D*	L	GF	GA
(Portugal) 2019	Did not qualify							2	0	1	1	3	4
(Portugal) 2022	Did not qualify							3	0	0	3	0	19
(Hungary) 2023	Did not qualify							3	0	1	2	6	19
(Croatia) 2027	Did not enter							Did not enter					
Total	0/3	—	—	—	—	—	—	8	0	2	6	9	42

*Draws include knockout matches decided on penalty kicks.

== See also ==
- Moldova women's national football team
