= Latvia women's national futsal team =

Latvia
- Association: Latvian Football Federation
- Confederation: UEFA (Europe)
- Head coach: Masimiljāno Bellarte
- Captain: Evelīna Sendija Čubare
- Most caps: Jekaterina Ovsjankina (8)
- Top scorer: Madara Ērika Paidere (4)
- FIFA code: LVA
- FIFA ranking: 69 ▼1 (8 May 2026)
- Highest FIFA ranking: 63 (May–October 2024)
- Lowest FIFA ranking: 63 (May–October 2024)
Home colours	Away colours

First international
- Latvia 2–0 Lithuania (Riga, Latvia; 28 April 2022)

Biggest win
- Lithuania 1–6 Latvia (Birštonas, Lithuania; 23 March 2024)

Biggest defeat
- France 9–0 Latvia (Podčetrtek, Slovenia; 18 March 2026)

The Latvia women's national futsal team (Latvian: Latvija Telpu futbola sieviešu izlase) represents Latvia in international futsal competitions and is governed by the Latvian Football Federation (LFF).

== History ==
With women's futsal growing across the continent, Latvia established its women's national team in 2022. The team debuted in April 2022, hosting Lithuania in a double-header, winning the first match and drawing the second. In May 2022, Latvia entered the Preliminary Round of the UEFA Women's Futsal Euro 2023 after missing the tournament's first two editions. However, the team lost all its matches and failed to qualify in its debut attempt.

After a one-year hiatus, Latvia traveled to Lithuania for two friendly matches, winning both and securing its biggest victory, a 6–1 triumph, as part of its preparations for the World Cup qualifiers. In October 2024, the team joined 25 others in the qualifying tournament for the inaugural FIFA Women's Futsal World Cup, set to be held in the Philippines. However, much like its Euro campaign, Latvia lost all its matches and finished last in its group.

== Results and fixtures ==
The following is a list of match results in the last 12 months, as well as any future matches that have been scheduled.
Legend

Win Draw Lose Fixture

=== 2024 ===
23 March Friendly	Lithuania	1–6	Latvia	Birštonas, Lithuania
13:00 UTC+2		Report	Stolipina 3'; Ovsjankina 14' (2pen.); Paidere 19', 21', 27'; Pelse 21'	Stadium: Birštono arena Attendance: 100; Referee: D. Norkus, L. Skladaitytė (LTU)

24 March Friendly	Lithuania	1–3	Latvia	Birštonas, Lithuania
13:00 UTC+2		Report	Pelse 11'; Paidere 11'; Own goal 31'	Stadium: Birštono arena Attendance: 100; Referee: D. Norkus, L. Skladaitytė (LTU)

16 October 2025 FIFA World Cup qualifying	Belgium	6–0	Latvia	Alingsås, Sweden
15:00 UTC+2		Report		Stadium: Estrad Alingsås; Attendance: 105; Referee: J. Lang (FRA), R. Tuomi (FIN)

17 October 2025 FIFA World Cup qualifying	Sweden	7–0	Latvia	Alingsås, Sweden
20:00 UTC+2		Report		Stadium: Estrad Alingsås; Attendance: 386; Referee: R. Tuomi (FIN), M. Czudzinowicz (POL)

19 October 2025 FIFA World Cup qualifying	Latvia	1–6	Slovakia	Alingsås, Sweden
13:00 UTC+2	Jakovele 27'43"	Report		Stadium: Estrad Alingsås; Attendance: 281; Referee: J. Lang (FRA), M. Czudzinowicz (POL)

== Staff ==
=== Coaching staff ===
As of 10 October 2024

Role	Name
Head Coach	(Latvia) Masimiljāno Bellarte
Assistant coach	(Latvia) Frančesko Džuljāno
Goalkeeper coach	(Latvia) Luka Kjavaroli
Doctor	(Latvia) Aleksandrs Drabovičs
Physiotherapist	(Latvia) Anna Poņatovska
Manager	(Latvia) Oļesja Maļikova

Staff (2026) at Latvian Football Federation Website

=== Head coach history ===
Name	Years	Matches	Won	Drawn	Lost	Win %
(Latvia) Artūrs Šketovs	2022	5	1	1	3	20%
(Latvia) Masimiljāno Bellarte	2024	5	2	0	3	40%

== Players ==
=== Current squad ===
The following 14 players have been called up for the 2025 FIFA World Cup qualifying mini-tournament hosted in Sweden from 16 to 19 October 2024.

No.	Pos.	Player	Date of birth (age)	Caps	Goals	Club
1	GK	Kristiāna Orleana	10 February 2003 (age 23)	5	0	(Latvian Football Federation) FK Auda
9	GK	Linda Vīksniņa	26 December 2000 (age 25)	2	0	(Latvian Football Federation) SK Kuorsova
12	GK	Jekaterīna Ponomarenko	3 March 2005 (age 21)	1	0	(Latvian Football Federation) Riga FC Academy
2	FP	Linda Kazlauska	20 January 2000 (age 26)	0	0	(Latvian Football Federation) Riga FC Academy
3	FP	Tatjana Jakovele	19 March 2005 (age 21)	2	1	(Latvian Football Federation) Riga FC Academy
4	FP	Sannija Redzoba	26 March 2004 (age 22)	0	0	(Latvian Football Federation) Riga FC Academy
5	FP	Agnese Stolipina	22 November 2001 (age 24)	5	1	(Latvian Football Federation) Rēzeknes BJSS
6	FP	Jekaterina Ovsjankina	9 November 2004 (age 21)	8	2	(Latvian Football Federation) Rēzeknes BJSS
7	FP	Dārta Silgale	23 November 2004 (age 21)	5	0	(Latvian Football Federation) Talsu futbols/RFS Women
8	FP	Madara Ērika Paidere	27 October 2004 (age 21)	4	4	(Latvian Football Federation) FK Auda
10	FP	Jana Priecuma	1 September 2006 (age 19)	0	0	(Latvian Football Federation) Riga FC Academy
11	FP	Elizabete Samušenko	5 April 1998 (age 28)	2	0	(Latvian Football Federation) Rēzeknes BJSS
13	FP	Līna Kuzmina	16 March 2000 (age 26)	4	0	(Latvian Football Federation) Riga FC Academy
14	FP	Evelīna Sendija Čubare (Captain)	19 March 1997 (age 29)	3	0	(Latvian Football Federation) FK Auda
15	FP	Viktorija Višņakova	9 May 2006 (age 20)	2	0	(Latvian Football Federation) Rēzeknes BJSS

== Competitive record ==
=== FIFA Futsal Women's World Cup ===
FIFA Futsal Women's World Cup record								Qualification record					
Year	Position	Pld	W	D*	L	GF	GA	Pld	W	D*	L	GF	GA
(Philippines) 2025	Did not qualify							3	0	0	3	1	19
Total	0/1	—	—	—	—	—	—	3	0	0	3	1	19

*Draws include knockout matches decided on penalty kicks.

=== UEFA Women's Futsal Championship ===
UEFA Women's Futsal Championship record								Qualifying record					
Year	Position	Pld	W	D*	L	GF	GA	Pld	W	D*	L	GF	GA
(Portugal) 2019	Did not enter							Did not enter					
(Portugal) 2022	Did not enter							Did not enter					
(Hungary) 2023	Did not qualify							3	0	0	3	1	18
(Croatia) 2027	Did not qualify							3	1	0	2	4	17
Total	0/4	—	—	—	—	—	—	6	1	0	5	5	35

*Draws include knockout matches decided on penalty kicks.

== See also ==
- Latvia women's national football team
