= Belgium women's national futsal team =

Belgium
- Nickname(s): Black Flames; Red Flames Futsal
- Association: Royal Belgian Football Association
- Confederation: UEFA (Europe)
- Head coach: Niki De Cock
- FIFA code: BEL
- FIFA ranking: 43 (24 September 2026)
- Highest FIFA ranking: 36 (May 2024)
- Lowest FIFA ranking: 39 (October 2024)
Home colours	Away colours

First international
- Netherlands 6–1 Belgium (Kerkrade, Netherlands; 2 May 1983)

Biggest win
- Spain 14–0 Belgium (Vantaa, Finland; 19 October 2022)

Biggest defeat
- Belgium 12–1 Moldova (Gibraltar; 11 May 2022)

The Belgium women's national futsal team (Dutch: Belgische futsalvrouwen, French: Équipe de Belgique féminine de futsal) represents Belgium in international women's futsal, and is controlled by the Royal Belgian Football Association (RBFA).

== History ==
Belgium played its first match against Netherlands on May 2, 1983, in Kerkrade, the Netherlands. The game ended in a 6–1 loss. After its debut, and due to limited competition on the women's futsal scene, the team mainly played friendlies, including 10 matches against the Dutch team from 1984 to 1990.

After a period of hiatus, Belgium returned to the international scene in 2018 for the UEFA Women's Futsal Euro 2019 qualifiers Preliminary round, held in Northern Ireland from August 21 to 24, 2018. The team won their opening match against the hosts and earned the nickname The Black Flames. However, a loss to Sweden on the final day meant they failed to qualify for the inaugural edition. in their second attempt, they managed to qualify for the main round.

Following the establishment of the FIFA Women's Futsal World Cup, Belgium registered for the European qualifiers, being drawn into Group 5 alongside Latvia, Slovakia, and hosts Sweden. The team failed to qualify for the inaugural edition, securing one win and two losses.

== Results and fixtures ==
The following is a list of match results in the last 12 months, as well as any future matches that have been scheduled.

Legend

Win Draw Lose Fixture

=== 2024 ===
6 April Friendly	Northern Ireland	1–5	Belgium	Newry, Northern Ireland

7 April Friendly	Northern Ireland	4–1	Belgium	Newry, Northern Ireland

14 May Friendly	Norway	2–1	Belgium	Trondheim, Norway

15 May Friendly	Norway	4–2	Belgium	Trondheim, Norway

6 October Friendly	Netherlands	9–2	Belgium	Zeist, Netherlands
	van den Boomgaard 2', 27', 32'; Dijkstra 7'; Hand 9', 18', 37'; Brand 11'; Luijks 22'	Report	Bougard 22'; Meyers 31'	Stadium: KNVB Campus; Referee: Davey Markerink (NED)

16 October 2025 World Cup qualification	Belgium	6–0	Latvia	Alingsås, Sweden
14:00	Bougard 7'00"; Corbeels 22'55"; In 23'58"; Bakar 29'38"; Meyers 31'26"; Peeters 38'10"	Report		Stadium: Estrad Alingsås; Attendance: 105; Referee: Julien Lang (FRA); Roosa-Maria Karoliina Tuomi (FIN)

17 October 2025 World Cup qualification	Slovakia	4–2	Belgium	Alingsås, Sweden
14:00	Chomová 15'35"; Macková 21'57"; Rybanská 25'07"; Tomčíková 31'32"	Report	In 5'54"; Bougard 25'49"	Stadium: Estrad Alingsås; Attendance: 167; Referee: Panagiotis Ntalas (GRE); Julien Lang (FRA)

19 October 2025 World Cup qualification	Sweden	11–1	Belgium	Alingsås, Sweden
17:00	Lundström 1'17", 26'12"; Lindqvist 7'09"; Aguilar 16'02"; Rolin 22'23", 26'41", 36'35"; Rångemyr 29'19"; Kiryo 33'24", 39'25"; Stegius 37'24"	Report	Corbeels 25'19"	Stadium: Estrad Alingsås; Attendance: 1,411; Referee: Roosa-Maria Karoliina Tuomi (FIN); Panagiotis Ntalas (GRE)

== Coaching staff ==
=== Current coaching staff ===
As of 2 February 2025

Role	Name
Head coach	(Belgium) Niki De Cock
Assistant coach	(Belgium) Hilde Demecheleer
Goalkeeping coach	(Belgium) Natasha Ribbens
Performance analyst	(Belgium) Ilhame Kodalci
Team doctor	(Belgium) Lize Vaes
Physical coach	(Belgium) Ismail Badiai
Physiotherapist	(Belgium) Kelly Berckmans
Team Manager	(Belgium) (Spain) Miguel Capilla Perez

== Players ==
=== Current squad ===
The following 14 players were called up for the 2025 FIFA World Cup qualifying matches against Latvia, Slovakia and Sweden on 16, 17 and 19 October 2024, respectively.

No.	Pos.	Player	Date of birth (age)	Club
1	GK	Zélie Lambert	18 September 2001 (age 25)	(Royal Belgian Football Association) Topsport Antwerpen
12	GK	Estelle Loos	27 July 2000 (age 26)	(Royal Belgian Football Association) RWD Molebeek Girls
3	DF	Aster Jansen	13 March 1999 (age 27)	(Royal Belgian Football Association) Besiktas Gent
5	DF	Morgane Wijns	28 May 1998 (age 28)	(Royal Belgian Football Association) FP Halle-Gooik
7	DF	Riana Nainggolan	3 May 1988 (age 38)	(Italian Football Federation) CUS Cagliari
15	DF	Mette Tiesters	3 April 2006 (age 20)	(Royal Belgian Football Association) Shokudo Aarschot
4	FW	Yasémin In	15 February 2002 (age 24)	(Royal Belgian Football Association) Besiktas Gent
6	FW	Justine Gomboso	24 July 1995 (age 31)	(Royal Belgian Football Association) Ent. Jeunesse Fléron
8	FW	Marie Bougard	6 February 1997 (age 29)	(Royal Belgian Football Association) Celtic FD Visé
9	FW	Marieke Peeters	7 July 1998 (age 28)	(Royal Belgian Football Association) Topsport Antwerpen
10	FW	Sara Bakar	23 January 2002 (age 24)	(Royal Belgian Football Association) Besiktas Gent
11	FW	Lauren Meyers	9 November 2003 (age 22)	(Royal Belgian Football Association) Full Hasselt
14	FW	Noa Corbeels	19 February 2001 (age 25)	(Royal Belgian Football Association) Topsport Antwerpen
16	FW	Tinne Van Den Bergh	14 January 1995 (age 31)	(Royal Belgian Football Association) Topsport Antwerpen

== Competitive record ==
=== FIFA Futsal Women's World Cup ===
FIFA Futsal Women's World Cup record									Qualification record					
Year	Round	Position	Pld	W	D*	L	GF	GA	Pld	W	D*	L	GF	GA
(Philippines) 2025	Did not qualify								3	2	0	1	14	9
Total	Best: —	0/1	—	—	—	—	—	—	3	1	0	2	9	15

*Draws include knockout matches decided on penalty kicks.

=== UEFA Women's Futsal Championship ===
UEFA Women's Futsal Championship record									Qualifying record					
Year	Round	Position	Pld	W	D*	L	GF	GA	Pld	W	D*	L	GF	GA
(Portugal) 2019	Did not qualify								3	1	1	1	10	14
(Portugal) 2022	Did not qualify								4	1	1	2	6	13
(Hungary) 2023	Did not qualify								6	2	2	2	22	32
(Croatia) 2027	Did not qualify								3	0	0	3	2	19
Total	Best:	0/4	—	—	—	—	—	—	16	4	4	8	40	78

*Draws include knockout matches decided on penalty kicks.

== See also ==
- Belgium women's national football team
