= Finland women's national futsal team =

Finland
- Shirt badge/Association crest
- Nickname(s): Tukaanit (Toucans)
- Association: Football Association of Finland (Suomen Palloliitto)
- Confederation: UEFA (Europe)
- Head coach: Jaakko Laitinen
- Captain: Sini Lauermaa
- FIFA code: FIN
- FIFA ranking: 17 (24 September 2026)
- Highest FIFA ranking: 17 (October 2024)
- Lowest FIFA ranking: 18 (May 2024)
Home colours	Away colours

First international
- Poland 1–2 Finland (Lubawa, Poland; 18 November 2017)

Biggest win
- Moldova 0–12 Finland (Ciorescu, Moldova; 19 October 2024)

Biggest defeat
- Finland 0–10 Brazil (Vantaa, Finland; 12 February 2025)

The Finland women's national futsal team represents Finland in international futsal competitions and is controlled by the Football Association of Finland.

== History ==
The Finland women's national futsal team played their first ever match against Poland on 18 November 2017 which they won 2–1.

They entered the UEFA qualifiers for the 2025 FIFA Futsal Women's World Cup in October 2024. Finland topped their group to advance from the main round to the Elite round.

== Results and fixtures ==
- The following is a list of match results in the last 12 months, as well as any future matches that have been scheduled.

Legend

Win Draw Lose Fixture

=== 2024 ===
20 February Friendly	Finland	2–5	Italy	Salo, Finland
18:30	Hannula 5:20, 39:07	Report	Berte' 4:28; Grieco 6:34, 25:29; Pratico' 15:23; Coppari 20:47	Stadium: Salohalli

22 February Friendly	Sweden	1–5	Finland	Salo, Finland
18:30	Roll 15:37	Report	Hannula 1:09; Juntikka 16:58, 24:25, 39:45; Halonen 35:05	Stadium: Salohalli

11 June 2024 Futsal Week June Cup	Morocco	2–4	Finland	Poreč, Croatia
17:00	Laftah 11:27; El Aoufi 17:53	Report	Lehtonen 03:31; Herranen 07:43; Viren 35:05; Jokisalo 36:13	Stadium: Finida hall Referee: Marijana Orešić (Croatia)

13 June 2024 Futsal Week June Cup	Croatia	1–3	Finland	Poreč, Croatia
17:00	37:28 (o.g.)	Report	Jokisalo 22:28; Lauermaa 23:10; Juntikka 26:14	Stadium: Finida hall Referee: Simone Zanfino (Italy)

15 June 2024 Futsal Week June Cup	Finland	2–4	Poland	Poreč, Croatia
19:15	Halonen 08:34; Jokisalo 16:40	Report	Szostak 07:46; Moskała 14:21; Bała 31:32; Moskała 32:17	Stadium: Finida hall Referee: Simone Zanfino (Italy)

16 June 2024 Futsal Week June Cup	Croatia	0–4	Finland	Poreč, Croatia
17:00		Report	Mäntylä 02:00; Ylikraka 23:26; Lehtonen 24:51; Ropanen 27:17	Stadium: Finida hall Referee: Simone Zanfino (Italy)

16 October 2025 FIFA World Cup qualification	Finland	5–2	England	Ciorescu, Moldova
15:00	Halonen 10:37; Herranen 16:36, 27:48; Viren 17:11; Jokisalo 27:20	Report	Halonen 20:40 (o.g.); Scotland 39:44	Stadium: FMF Futsal Arena; Attendance: 40; Referee: Mariia Myslovska (Ukraine)

17 October 2025 FIFA World Cup qualification	Slovenia	0–4	Finland	Ciorescu, Moldova
15:00		Report	Jokisalo 3:09, 27:49; Lind 23:19, 26:40	Stadium: FMF Futsal Arena; Attendance: 10; Referee: Filipa Prata (Portugal)

19 October 2025 FIFA World Cup qualification	Moldova	0–12	Finland	Ciorescu, Moldova
18:00		Report	Juntikka 1:01; Mäntylä 5:53; Viren 17:03, 20:39; Herranen 18:01; Hannula 25:08, 33:13; Luotonen 28:51, 32:11; Lind 34:18, 38:53; Halonen 39:56	Stadium: FMF Futsal Arena; Attendance: 110; Referee: Mariia Myslovska (Ukraine)

=== 2025 ===
14 January Friendly	Morocco	1–5	Finland	Rabat, Morocco
18:00	Hajri 36:02	Report	Hannula 11:30; Lind 15:12, 26:28; Luotonen 24:22; Heikkilä 36:24	Stadium: Complexe Mohammed VI de Football; Attendance: 30; Referee: Khalid Hnich (Morocco)

15 January Friendly	Morocco	4–3	Finland	Rabat, Morocco
18:00	Laftah 06:47; Knaidi 07:42; Zaid Alkilani 23:13; El Aoufi 32:16	Report	Heikkilä 04:39; Herranen 11:42; Enwena 30:41	Stadium: Complexe Mohammed VI de Football

11 February Friendly	Finland	0–9	Brazil	Tampere, Finland
18:00		Report	Tampa 7:30, 38:02; B. Souza 14:29, 29:54; Emilly 15:56; Vanin 28:31; Amandinha 29:08; Vanessa 32:06; Detoni 36:11	Stadium: Kauppi Sports Center 1

12 February Friendly	Finland	0–10	Brazil	Vantaa, Finland
19:00		Report	Lucileia 0:40, 4:07; Detoni 4:52; Tampa 5:59, 6:37; Vanessa 8:20; Emilly 24:46, 27:23, 37:34; Vanin 26:05	Stadium: Energy Arena 1

19 March 2025 FIFA World Cup qualification	Spain	4–0	Finland	France

20 March 2025 FIFA World Cup qualification	France	1–2	Finland	France

22 March 2025 FIFA World Cup qualification	Finland	2–2	Poland	France

=== 2026 ===
8 October 2027 UEFA Futsal qualification	Finland	1–0	Czech Republic	Portugal

9 October 2027 UEFA Futsal qualification	Netherlands	0–3	Finland	Portugal

11 October 2027 UEFA Futsal qualification	Portugal	3–0	Finland	Portugal

20 November 2027 UEFA Futsal qualification	Norway	1–3	Finland	Norway

24 November 2027 UEFA Futsal qualification	Finland	–	Norway	Finland

== Players ==
The following players were called up for the Friendly matches against Morocco on 14 and 15 January 2025.

=== Current squad ===
No.	Pos.	Player	Date of birth (age)	Club
1	GK	Emiilia Syvänen	28 October 1990 (age 36)	(Football Association of Finland) FC Nokia
12	GK	Tiia Ropanen	7 April 1991 (age 35)	(Football Association of Finland) Ilves FS
	GK	Helena Unkuri		(Football Association of Finland) Futsal Mad Max
2	FP	Anna-Kaisa Hannuksela	14 January 1991 (age 35)	(Football Association of Finland) KaDy
3	FP	Sandra Lind	3 September 1996 (age 30)	(Football Association of Finland) HIFK FS
4	FP	Anni-Elina Luotonen	16 January 2000 (age 26)	(Italian Football Federation) CF Scandicci
5	FP	Stella Enwena		(Football Association of Finland) RaiFu
6	FP	Tiiu Lehtonen		(Football Association of Finland) RaiFu
7	FP	Rosa-Maria Sirén	23 December 1999 (age 26)	(Football Association of Finland) Ilves FS
9	FP	Iina Heikkilä	5 March 2004 (age 22)	(Football Association of Finland) Ilves FS
8	FP	Hanna Halonen	2 December 1995 (age 30)	(Football Association of Finland) HIFK FS
11	FP	Netta Hannula	8 October 1993 (age 33)	(Football Association of Finland) Ilves FS
13	FP	Emilia Jokisalo	25 August 1998 (age 28)	(Italian Football Federation) Lazio
14	FP	Sini Lauermaa	8 August 1997 (age 29)	(Football Association of Finland) KaDy
16	FP	Senni Viren	22 November 1999 (age 27)	(Football Association of Finland) Mad Max
17	FP	Matilda Herranen	18 June 1999 (age 27)	(Football Association of Finland) Ilves FS
19	FP	Maria Mäntylä	28 February 1989 (age 37)	(Italian Football Federation) Cagliari

== Tournament records ==
=== FIFA Futsal Women's World Cup ===
FIFA Futsal Women's World Cup record
Year	Round	Position	GP	W	D	L	GS	GA
(Philippines) 2025	Did not qualify							
Total	–	0/1	0	0	0	0	0	0

=== UEFA European Championship ===
UEFA European Championship								Qualification record					
Year	Round	Pld	W	D	L	GF	GA	Pld	W	D	L	GF	GA
(Portugal) 2019	Did not qualify							5	4	0	1	28	9
(Portugal) 2022	Did not qualify							3	2	0	1	7	5
(Hungary) 2023	Did not qualify							3	1	0	2	13	10
(Croatia) 2027	Future event												
Total	0/3	0	0	0	0	0	0	11	7	0	4	48	24
