= Serbia women's national futsal team =

Serbia
- Shirt badge/Association crest
- Association: Football Association of Serbia
- Confederation: UEFA (Europe)
- Head coach: Vladimir Jovanovic
- FIFA code: SRB
- FIFA ranking: 56 ▼3 (8 May 2026)
- Highest FIFA ranking: 43 (May 2024)
- Lowest FIFA ranking: 49 (October 2024)
Home colours	Away colours

First international
- Slovenia 2–1 Serbia (Laško, Slovenia; 25 August 2018)

Biggest win
- Lithuania 1–10 Serbia (Jonava, Lithuania; 8 May 2021)

Biggest defeat
- Italy 19–1 Serbia (Poreč, Croatia; 16 June 2026)

The Serbia women's national futsal team (Serbian: Ženska futsal reprezentacija Srbije) represents Serbia in international women's futsal competitions and is controlled by the Football Association of Serbia (FSS).

== History ==
Despite initial resistance and skepticism to establishing a women's team, Marija Armuš and Barbara Izgarević led the formation of Serbia's first women's university futsal national team, which competed at the 2016 European Universities Games in Zagreb, paving the way for the official national team's establishment in May 2018. After registering for the qualifiers of the inaugural UEFA Women's Futsal Euro in 2018, Serbia played its first match on 25 August 2018 against Slovenia in Laško, suffering a 2–1 defeat. with Armuš herself scoring the first international goal for the team.

During their first qualifying campaign in the UEFA Women's Futsal Euro 2019 qualifiers, the team was defeated in all their matches, scoring only 2 goals while conceding 26. In their second attempt in 2021, the team started from the Preliminary round. Winning two out of their three matches, thus failing to qualify for the main round.

After the establishment of the FIFA Women's Futsal World Cup in 2024, Serbia participated in the inaugural European qualifiers and hosted the Main round Group 1 Mini-tournament. However, they failed to qualify after two losses to Croatia and Italy.

== Results and fixtures ==
- The following is a list of match results in the last 12 months, as well as any future matches that have been scheduled.

Legend

Win Draw Lose Void or Postponed Fixture

=== 2024 ===
14 March Futsal Love Serbia Cup	Serbia	2–6	Hungary	Vrnjačka Banja, Serbia

15 March Futsal Love Serbia Cup	Serbia	0–4	Czech Republic	Vrnjačka Banja, Serbia

17 March Futsal Love Serbia Cup	Serbia	0–8	France	Vrnjačka Banja, Serbia

18 March Futsal Love Serbia Cup	Serbia	1–10	Slovakia	Vrnjačka Banja, Serbia

7 June Friendly	Serbia	2–3	Saudi Arabia	Sarajevo, Bosnia and Herzegovina

8 June Friendly	Saudi Arabia	5–2	Serbia	Sarajevo, Bosnia and Herzegovina

15 October 2025 FIFA World Cup qualifying	Croatia	8–0	Serbia	Vrnjačka Banja, Serbia

16 October 2025 FIFA World Cup qualifying	Serbia	6–0	Lithuania	Vrnjačka Banja, Serbia

16 October 2025 FIFA World Cup qualifying	Serbia	0–12	Italy	Vrnjačka Banja, Serbia

== Players ==
=== Current squad ===
The following players were called up for the three 2025 FIFA World Cup qualifying mini-tournament, from 15 to 18 October 2024.

No.	Pos.	Player	Date of birth (age)	Club
1	GK	Andrea Šipetić	3 November 2002 (age 23)	(Football Association of Serbia) ŽFK Milutinac
12	GK	Bojana Jevtić	16 August 1993 (age 32)	(Football Association of Serbia) ŽKMF Intelektualac
2	DF	Andrijana Trišić	2 September 1994 (age 31)	
4	DF	Mirjana Babić	25 November 1995 (age 30)	(Football Association of Serbia) ŽFK Radnički Kragujevac
5	DF	Tamara Perlinac	20 December 1995 (age 30)	(Football Association of Serbia) ŽFK Vojvodina
7	DF	Milena Pruderović	19 April 1990 (age 36)	(Football Association of Serbia) ŽFK FON
13	DF	Jovana Jevremović	4 September 1995 (age 30)	(Football Association of Serbia) GFK 2023
14	DF	Una Miljković	11 February 1994 (age 32)	(Football Association of Serbia) ŽFK Žarkovo
3	FW	Jovana Janković	11 September 2004 (age 21)	(Football Association of Serbia) ŽFK Karađorđe
6	FW	Željana Maksimović	9 April 1998 (age 28)	(Croatian Football Federation) ŽNK Neretva
8	FW	Natalija Drobnjak	4 May 2000 (age 26)	(Football Association of Serbia) ŽFK Milutinac
9	FW	Marija Vukovic	25 March 1990 (age 36)	(Football Association of Serbia) ŽFK Radnički Kragujevac
10	FW	Ivana Trbojević	26 July 2000 (age 25)	(Hellenic Football Federation) NEES Atromitu VFC 2018
11	FW	Jelena Marenić	27 November 1991 (age 34)	(Football Association of Serbia) ŽFK Žarkovo

== Competitive record ==
=== FIFA Futsal Women's World Cup ===
FIFA Futsal Women's World Cup record									Qualification record					
Year	Round	Position	Pld	W	D*	L	GF	GA	Pld	W	D*	L	GF	GA
(Philippines) 2025	Did not qualify								3	1	0	2	6	20
Total	Best: —	0/1	—	—	—	—	—	—	3	1	0	2	6	20

*Draws include knockout matches decided on penalty kicks.

=== UEFA Women's Futsal Championship ===
UEFA Women's Futsal Championship record									Qualifying record					
Year	Round	Position	Pld	W	D*	L	GF	GA	Pld	W	D*	L	GF	GA
(Portugal) 2019	Did not qualify								3	0	0	3	2	26
(Portugal) 2022	Did not qualify								3	2	0	1	16	5
(Hungary) 2023	Did not qualify								3	2	0	1	12	6
(Croatia) 2027	Did not qualify								3	1	1	1	6	2
Total	Best:	0/4	—	—	—	—	—	—	12	5	1	6	36	39

*Draws include knockout matches decided on penalty kicks.

== See also ==
- Serbia women's national football team
