= Slovakia women's national futsal team =

Slovakia
- Association: Slovak Football Association (Slovenský futbalový zväz)
- Confederation: UEFA (Europe)
- FIFA code: SVK
- FIFA ranking: 48 (24 September 2026)
- Highest FIFA ranking: 49 (May 2024)
- Lowest FIFA ranking: 50 (October 2024)
Home colours	Away colours

First international
- Czechia 6–3 Slovakia (Ostrava, Czechia; 7 December 2014)

Biggest win
- Serbia 1–10 Slovakia (Vrnjačka Banja, Serbia; 18 March 2024)

Biggest defeat
- Slovakia 1–12 Italy (Halmstad, Sweden; 23 October 2021)

The Slovakia women's national futsal team (Slovak: Slovenská ženská futsalová reprezentácia) represents Slovakia in international futsal competitions and is controlled by the Slovak Football Association.

== History ==
After the establishment of the UEFA Women's Futsal Euro in 2018, Slovakia entered the inaugural tournament and was drawn into the Preliminary round with Finland and Lithuania. The team earned a single point from their two matches, failing to qualify for the inaugural edition. In the 2022 edition, Slovakia topped their preliminary group, winning all three matches to qualify for the main round for the first time. However, they lost all their matches in that round, including two heavy defeats. In the 2023 edition, Slovakia qualified for the main round for the second consecutive time, remaining undefeated in the preliminary round. This time, they only lost one of their three matches in the main round.

== Results and fixtures ==
- The following is a list of match results in the last 12 months, as well as any future matches that have been scheduled.

Legend

Win Draw Lose Fixture

=== 2024 ===
15 March Futsal Love Winter Cup	Slovakia	1–3	Hungary	Vrnjačka Banja, Serbia

16 March Futsal Love Winter Cup	France	6–0	Slovakia	Vrnjačka Banja, Serbia

17 March Futsal Love Winter Cup	Czech Republic	3–0	Slovakia	Vrnjačka Banja, Serbia

18 March Futsal Love Winter Cup	Serbia	1–10	Slovakia	Vrnjačka Banja, Serbia

10 September Friendly	Slovakia	1–4	Italy	Šamorín, Slovakia

11 September Friendly	Slovakia	0–10	Italy	Šamorín, Slovakia

12 October Friendly	Hungary	6–0	Slovakia	Szigetszentmiklós, Hungary

16 October 2025 World Cup qualification	Slovakia	4–6	Sweden	Alingsås, Sweden

17 October 2025 World Cup qualification	Slovakia	4–2	Belgium	Alingsås, Sweden

19 October 2025 World Cup qualification	Latvia	1–6	Slovakia	Alingsås, Sweden

== Coaching staff ==
As of 2 October 2024

Position	Name
Head coach	(Slovakia) Roman Sedlárik
Assistant coach	(Slovakia) Peter Kafún
Goalkeeping coach	(Slovakia) Dalibor Repa
Mental Coach	(Slovakia) Lukáš Štecák
Doctor	(Slovakia) Peter Krajč
Physiotherapist	(Slovakia) Soňa Cízmarová
Masseur	(Slovakia) Matúš Maťejček

== Players ==
=== Current squad ===
- The following players were called up for the 2025 FIFA World Cup qualifying matches against Sweden, Belgium and Latvia in 16, 17 and 19 October 2024, respectively.

No.	Pos.	Player	Date of birth (age)	Club
1	GK	Petra Tišliarová	5 January 1993 (age 33)	(Slovak Football Association) SLC B. Bystrica
6	GK	Julianna Gajdošová	17 February 2007 (age 19)	(Slovak Football Association) FSC Prievidza
12	GK	Denisa Mochnacká	19 January 1999 (age 27)	(Polish Football Association) AZS UJ Krakov
7	DF	Diana Macková	27 February 1999 (age 27)	(Slovak Football Association) FK Ekoprim Prešov
8	DF	Tamara Gembická	1 January 2000 (age 26)	(Slovak Football Association) SLC B. Bystrica
11	DF	Zuzana Tomčíková	7 September 2003 (age 23)	(Slovak Football Association) FSC Prievidza
13	DF	Simona Chomová	21 April 2005 (age 21)	(Slovak Football Association) FK Ekoprim Prešov
18	DF	Janka Jusková	23 November 2005 (age 20)	(Slovak Football Association) FK Ekoprim Prešov
19	DF	Vanesa Vojsová	18 October 2005 (age 20)	(Slovak Football Association) Partizán Bardejov BŠK
3	FW	Zita Baniková	3 August 1995 (age 31)	(Slovak Football Association) ŠK Makroteam Žilina
9	FW	Radoslava Jacenková	12 December 2004 (age 21)	(Slovak Football Association) Partizán Bardejov BŠK
10	FW	Nikola Rybanská	3 February 1995 (age 31)	(Slovak Football Association) FSC Prievidza
17	FW	Nikoleta Hološková	11 June 1992 (age 34)	(Slovak Football Association) FSC Prievidza
20	FW	Klaudia Tyčiaková	27 December 2004 (age 21)	(Slovak Football Association) ŠK Makroteam Žilina

== Competitive record ==
=== FIFA Futsal Women's World Cup ===
FIFA Futsal Women's World Cup record									Qualification record					
Year	Round	Position	Pld	W	D*	L	GF	GA	Pld	W	D*	L	GF	GA
(Philippines) 2025	Did not qualify								3	2	0	1	14	9
Total	Best: —	0/0	—	—	—	—	—	—	3	2	0	1	14	9

*Draws include knockout matches decided on penalty kicks.

=== UEFA Women's Futsal Championship ===
UEFA Women's Futsal Championship record									Qualifying record					
Year	Round	Position	Pld	W	D*	L	GF	GA	Pld	W	D*	L	GF	GA
(Portugal) 2019	Did not qualify								2	0	1	1	3	4
(Portugal) 2022	Did not qualify								6	3	0	3	24	31
(Hungary) 2023	Did not qualify								6	2	3	1	14	11
(Croatia) 2027	Did not qualify								3	1	0	2	7	11
Total	Best:	0/4	—	—	—	—	—	—	17	6	4	7	48	57

*Draws include knockout matches decided on penalty kicks.

== See also ==
- Slovakia women's national football team
