= England women's national futsal team =

England
- Nickname(s): Lionesses
- Association: The Football Association
- Confederation: UEFA (Europe)
- FIFA code: ENG
- FIFA ranking: 72 (24 September 2026)

First international
- Finland 5–2 England (Ciorescu, Moldova; 16 October 2024)

Biggest win
- Moldova 0–8 England (Ciorescu, Moldova; 17 October 2024)

Biggest defeat
- Finland 5–2 England (Ciorescu, Moldova; 16 October 2024)

The England women's national futsal team represents the England in international women's futsal competitions. It is governed by Futsal England in partnership with The Football Association.

== History ==
In December 2022, The Football Association (FA) entered a deal with Futsal England to be a "partner" to help govern futsal in England. Futsal England raised funds to reestablish both the men's futsal team and set up the first women's futsal team.

The formation of the women's team was announced in January 2024. England played at the main round of the 2025 FIFA Futsal Women's World Cup UEFA qualifiers in Moldova, their first ever tournament.

== Tournament records ==
=== FIFA Futsal Women's World Cup ===
FIFA Futsal Women's World Cup record
Year	Round	Position	GP	W	D	L	GS	GA
(Philippines) 2025	Did not qualify							
Total	–	0/1	0	0	0	0	0	0

=== UEFA European Championship ===
UEFA European Championship								Qualification record					
Year	Round	Pld	W	D	L	GF	GA	Pld	W	D	L	GF	GA
(Portugal) 2019	Did not exist							Did not exist					
(Portugal) 2022	Did not exist							Did not exist					
(Hungary) 2023	Did not exist							Did not exist					
(Croatia) 2027	Did not qualify							3	1	2	0	5	1
Total	0/4	0	0	0	0	0	0	3	1	2	0	5	1

== Fixtures and results ==
16 October 2024 2025 FIFA World Cup qualification (UEFA)	Finland	5–2	England	Ciorescu, Moldova
14:00 (15:00 UTC+3)	Halonen 10'37"; Herranen 16'36", 27'48"; Viren 17'11"; Jokisalo 27'20"	Report	Halonen 20'40" (o.g.); Scotland 39'44"	Stadium: FMF Futsal Arena; Attendance: 40; Referee: Mariia Myslovska (UKR); Jasmina Mickoska (SRB); Filipa Prata (POR)

17 October 2024 2025 FIFA World Cup qualification (UEFA)	Moldova	0–8	England	Ciorescu, Moldova
17:00 (18:00 UTC+3)		Report	Gurr 4'40", 23'58"; Kural 8'40", 13'25"; Brennan 14'21", 32'14"; Miller 31'41"; Tobin 33'31"	Stadium: FMF Futsal Arena; Attendance: 50; Referee: Jasmina Mickoska (SRB); Marijana Orešić (CRO); Mariia Myslovska (UKR)

19 October 2024 2025 FIFA World Cup qualification (UEFA)	England	2–4	Slovenia	Ciorescu, Moldova
14:00 (15:00 UTC+3)	Kural 5'52"; Gurr 37'34"	Report	Ines 14'49"; Tanšek 24'19"; Ložar 26'25"; Žvokelj 33'04"	Stadium: FMF Futsal Arena; Attendance: 40; Referee: Marijana Orešić (CRO); Jasmina Mickoska (SRB); Filipa Prata (POR)

== Players ==
=== Current Squad ===
The following 14 players were named in the squad for the FIFA Futsal Women's World Cup UEFA qualification matches against Finland, Moldova, and Slovenia on 16, 17, and 19 October 2024 respectively.

No.	Pos.	Player	Date of birth (age)	Club
1	GK	Alicia Grimmond	27 January 2004 (age 20)	Helvecia Futsal Club
22	GK	Joy Lowe	11 August 2005 (age 19)	Bolton Futsal Club
2	DF	Helena Scotland	21 February 1996 (age 28)	Chiltern Futsal Club
3	DF	Sofia Wilby	1 December 2006 (age 18)	Manchester Futsal Club
4	DF	Kate McGreavy	19 May 1995 (age 29)	Bloomsbury Futsal Club
5	DF	Charlotte Gurr	16 August 1989 (age 35)	Helvecia Futsal Club
6	DF	Kirstie Kural	26 March 1989 (age 35)	Bolton Futsal Club
8	DF	Emma Tune (captain)	2 October 1988 (age 36)	Helvecia Futsal Club
14	DF	Alisha Miller	5 March 1996 (age 28)	Birmingham WLV Futsal Club
7	FW	Kerry Walklett	5 August 1995 (age 29)	Hartpury Futsal Club
9	FW	Jade Grove	3 November 2000 (age 24)	Southampton Aztecs Futsal Club
10	FW	Ella Brennan	28 December 2005 (age 19)	Derby Futsal Club
11	FW	Lailah Booth	8 February 2004 (age 20)	Bolton Futsal Club
12	FW	Laura Tobin	17 April 1994 (age 30)	Bolton Futsal Club
