= Norway women's national futsal team =

Norway
- Association: Norges Fotballforbund (NFF)
- Confederation: UEFA (Europe)
- Head coach: Morten Ravlo
- FIFA code: NOR
- FIFA ranking: 50 ▲5 (12 December 2025)
- Highest FIFA ranking: 68 (October 2024)
- Lowest FIFA ranking: 68 (October 2024)

First international
- Norway 2–1 Belgium (Trondheim, Norway; 14 May 2024)

Biggest win
- Norway 9–0 Kazakhstan (Trondheim, Norway; 19 March 2026)

Biggest defeat
- Hungary 3–2 Norway (Sarajevo, Bosnia and Herzegovina; 16 October 2024)

The Norway women's national futsal team represents Norway in international futsal competitions and is controlled by the Norwegian Football Federation, the governing body for football in Norway.

== History ==
The Norwegian Football Federation announced the formation of a women's national futsal team in January 2024. A pool for the national team was created by March 2024 with Morten Ravlo as head coach. The 16-woman roster was finalized by April 2024.

Their first ever international match was held on 14 May 2024 at Trondheim where they won 2–1 against Belgium. They won again 4–2 against Belgium in the same venue on the following day.

== Tournament records ==
=== FIFA Futsal Women's World Cup ===
FIFA Futsal Women's World Cup record
Year	Round	Position	GP	W	D	L	GS	GA
(Philippines) 2025	Did not qualify							
Total	–	0/1	0	0	0	0	0	0

=== UEFA European Championship ===
UEFA European Championship								Qualification record					
Year	Round	Pld	W	D	L	GF	GA	Pld	W	D	L	GF	GA
(Portugal) 2019	Did not exist							Did not exist					
(Portugal) 2022	Did not exist							Did not exist					
(Hungary) 2023	Did not exist							Did not exist					
Total	0/3	0	0	0	0	0	0	0	0	0	0	0	0

== Fixtures and results ==
14 May 2024 Friendly	Norway	2–1	Belgium	Trondheim, Norway
	Aune 9'; Vik 23'	Report 1, 2	Bougard 34'	Stadium: Kolstad Arena; Attendance: 1,350

15 May 2024 Friendly	Norway	4–2	Belgium	Trondheim, Norway
	Kristiansen 13'; Meyer 26'; Vik 26', 33'	Report 1, 2	? 12'; ? 12'	Stadium: Kolstad Arena

11 September 2024 Friendly	Czech Republic	3–3	Norway	Teplice, Czech Republic
	? 1'; ? 29'; ? 39'	Report 1, 2	Mikkelsen 20'; Meyer 30', 30'

12 September 2024 Friendly	Czech Republic	2–2	Norway	Teplice, Czech Republic
	? 4'; ? 19'	1, 2	Sandtrøen 6'; Maren Grønning Thorsø 16'

16 October 2024 2025 World Cup qualification	Hungary	3–2	Norway	Sarajevo, Bosnia and Herzegovina
20:00	Tagyi 18'20"; C. Krascsenics 21'44", 35'29"	Report	Sandtrøen 6'50"; Vik 16'43" (pen.)	Stadium: Sports Hall East Sarajevo; Attendance: 50; Referee: Filipe Gonçalo Santos Duarte (POR); Zviad Bliadze (GEO); Alice Vévodvá (CZE)

17 October 2024 2025 World Cup qualification	Bosnia and Herzegovina	2–3	Norway	Sports Hall East Sarajevo, Sarajevo
20:00	Meyer 14'16" (o.g.); Vujadin 39'51" (pen.)	Report	Meyer 6'00"; Vik 12'51"; Halgunset 18'30"	Attendance: 30; Referee: Alice Vévodvá (CZE); Filipe Gonçalo Santos Duarte (POR); Daniele D'adamo (SMR)

19 October 2024 2025 World Cup qualification	Norway	4–1	Belarus	Sports Hall East Sarajevo, Sarajevo
20:00	Van Der Weel 11'31"; Halgunset 12'37" (pen.), 16'31" (pen.); Meyer 32'51"	Report	Igrusha 10'23"	Attendance: 50; Referee: Alice Vévodvá (CZE); Zviad Bliadze (GEO); Daniele D'adamo (SMR)

== Head coaches ==
- (Norway) Morten Ravlo (2024–)
