= Futsal in the Netherlands =

Indoor soccer popular in the Netherlands

Futsal or indoor soccer became popular in the Netherlands in the 1960s when Dutch marines took home the game they’d watched and enjoyed abroad. Initially, they played in large empty sheds or factory floors. It took another decade before the first official Royal Dutch Football Association competition was created. It was Scagha ’66 from the northern village of Schagen who clinched the first national title.

Futsal rapidly gained popularity in the Netherlands, particularly after 1989, when the country hosted the first ever FIFA Futsal World Cup. The Dutch national team finished in second position after being beaten by Brazil 2–1 in the final, their best result to date. The first competitions in the Netherlands were staged at the local level before spreading to regional and district competitions. In the 1980s, a pyramid structure, involving three first divisions and an Eredivisie, was opted for. Following a series of structural changes, there are now six first divisions, equaling the number of KNVB districts, and one Eredivisie.

From the 2011-12 season, futsal has become a separate entity with the KNVB management structure, with its own governing committee. Its tasked with developing the sport and meeting the KNVB’s key ambitions as set out in its 2010 Masterplan. These include:

- a target of 130,000 registered players
- a top-ten position in the world ranking for the national team
- structural participation of the national team in World and European championships
