= Futsal in Slovenia =

Futsal in Slovenia is governed by the Football Association of Slovenia.

== History ==
In Slovenia, futsal has been played from the mid-1980s. In the beginning, there was only a tournament system, followed by the first official national championship in the 1995–96 season. In the same year, the national futsal team of Slovenia was established under the auspices of the Football Association of Slovenia.

== Recent history ==
After sixteen years, this sport has developed to such an extent that the national championship consists of the first league (with eight teams), 2nd league (11 teams), two 3rd leagues (26 teams), junior league (14 teams), four cadet leagues (28 teams), and leagues of older boys (9 teams) and younger boys (9 teams).

== National team ==
As a result of good work in clubs all over the country, the national futsal team managed to qualify three times for the final UEFA Futsal Championship in the past nine years (2003, 2010, 2012).

Likewise, the youth national team (U-21) has reached the final tournament in 2008.
