= France women's national futsal team =

France
- Nickname(s): Les Bleus (The Blues)
- Association: Fédération Française de Football (FFF)
- Confederation: UEFA (Europe)
- Head coach: Pierre-Etienne Demillier
- FIFA code: FRA
- FIFA ranking: 34 ▼1 (24 September 2026)
- Highest FIFA ranking: 56 (June 2024)
- Lowest FIFA ranking: 60 (October 2024)

First international
- France 1–1 Finland (La Chapelle-sur-Erdre, France; 7 November 2023)

Biggest win
- Northern Ireland 0–12 France (Podčetrtek, Slovenia; 19 March 2026)

Biggest defeat
- Sweden 9–1 France (Varberg, Sweden; 16 May 2024)

The France women's national futsal team represents France in international futsal competitions and is controlled by the French Football Federation (FFF; Fédération française de football), the governing body for football in France.

== History ==
The French Football Federation launched its first women's national futsal team in 2023. The first squad was announced on 17 October with Pierre-Etienne Demillier as its head coach. Their first ever match was on 7 November against Finland in La Chapelle-sur-Erdre which ended in a 1–1 draw. On February 21, the won 3–1 against Slovenia in Slovenske Konjice; their first ever victory. In March 2024, they clinched their first ever tournament title when they competed at the five-nation Futsal Love Serbia Winter Cup in Serbia.

Their competitive debut was the UEFA qualifiers for the 2025 FIFA Futsal Women's World Cup in October 2024. France topped their group to advance from the main round to the Elite round.

== Tournament records ==
=== FIFA Futsal Women's World Cup ===
FIFA Futsal Women's World Cup record
Year	Round	Position	GP	W	D	L	GS	GA
(Philippines) 2025	Did not qualify							
Total	–	0/1	0	0	0	0	0	0

=== UEFA European Championship ===
UEFA European Championship								Qualification record					
Year	Round	Pld	W	D	L	GF	GA	Pld	W	D	L	GF	GA
(Portugal) 2019	Did not exist							Did not exist					
(Portugal) 2022	Did not exist							Did not exist					
(Hungary) 2023	Did not exist							Did not exist					
(Croatia) 2027	Did not qualify							6	4	0	2	33	11
Total	0/4	0	0	0	0	0	0	6	4	0	2	33	11

== Fixtures and results ==
7 November 2023 Friendly	France	1–1	Finland	La Chapelle-sur-Erdre, France
		Report		Stadium: CREPS des Pays de la Loire; Attendance: 500

8 November 2023 Friendly	France	1–2	Finland	Montaigu-Vendée, France
		Report		Stadium: Maxime-Bossis Complex; Attendance: 400

20 February 2024 Friendly	Slovenia	2–2	France	Celje, Slovenia
		Report		Stadium: Dvorana Kajuh

21 February 2024 Friendly	Slovenia	1–3	France	Slovenske Konjice, Slovenia
		Report		Stadium: Športna Dvorana

14 March 2024 Futsal Love Serbia Winter Cup	Czech Republic	2–2	France	Vrnjačka Banja, Serbia
		Report		Stadium: Vlade Divac Sports Hall

16 March 2024 Futsal Love Serbia Winter Cup	France	6–0	Slovakia	Vrnjačka Banja, Serbia
		Report		Stadium: Vlade Divac Sports Hall

17 March 2024 Futsal Love Serbia Winter Cup	France	8–0	Serbia	Vrnjačka Banja, Serbia
		Report		Stadium: Vlade Divac Sports Hall

18 March 2024 Futsal Love Serbia Winter Cup	France	4–2	Hungary	Vrnjačka Banja, Serbia
		Report		Stadium: Vlade Divac Sports Hall

14 May 2024 Friendly	Sweden	9–5	France	Varberg, Sweden
		Report		Stadium: Arena Varberg

16 May 2024 Friendly	Sweden	9–1	France	Varberg, Sweden
		Report		Stadium: Arena Varberg

10 September 2024 Friendly	France	0–6	Poland	Kraków, Poland
		Report		Stadium: University School of Physical Education in Kraków

11 September 2024 Friendly	Poland	7–2	France	Kraków, Poland
		Report		Stadium: University School of Physical Education in Kraków

16 October 2024 2025 FIFA World Cup qualification (UEFA)	Ukraine	1–3	France	Teplice, Czech Republic
16:00	Volovenko 23'21"	Report	Alberbide 7'28"; Atamaniuk 16'00"; Bitterlin 39'40"	Stadium: Sportovní hala Teplice; Attendance: 40; Referee: Josip Barton (MKD); Florentina Kallaba (KOS); Martina Piccolo (ITA)

17 October 2024 2025 FIFA World Cup qualification (UEFA)	Czech Republic	2–2	France	Teplice, Czech Republic
19:00	Soušková 31'20"; Beštová 32'37"	Report	Pellegry 36'29"; Alberbide 37'21"	Stadium: Sportovní hala Teplice; Attendance: 321; Referee: Florentina Kallaba (KOS); Fatma Özlem Tursun (TUR); Josip Barton (MKD)

19 October 2024 2025 FIFA World Cup qualification (UEFA)	France	5–2	Northern Ireland	Teplice, Czech Republic
16:00	Badr Bassem 6'07"; Pellegry 8'44"; Alberbide 18'25"; Boissinot 28'53"; Bitterlin 34'09"	Report	Dempster 26'23", 32'48"	Stadium: Sportovní hala Teplice; Attendance: 54; Referee: Florentina Kallaba (KOS); Josip Barton (MKD); Martina Piccolo (ITA)

== Honours ==
- Futsal Love Serbia Winter Cup

Champions: 2024
