= Italy women's national futsal team =

Italy
- Shirt badge/Association crest
- Nickname(s): Le Azzurre (The Blues)
- Association: Italian Football Federation (FIGC)
- Confederation: UEFA (Europe)
- Head coach: Francesca Salvatore
- Captain: Ludovica Coppari
- Most caps: Ludovica Coppari (52)
- Top scorer: Sara Boutimah (38)
- FIFA code: ITA
- FIFA ranking: 5 (8 May 2026)
- Highest FIFA ranking: 8 (October 2024)
- Lowest FIFA ranking: 10 (May 2024)
Home colours	Away colours

First international
- Italy 5–0 Hungary (Rome, Italy; 25 June 2015)

Biggest win
- Italy 19–1 Serbia (Poreč, Croatia; 16 June 2026)

Biggest defeat
- Spain 7–0 Italy (San Javier, Spain; 24 October 2018)

FIFA Futsal Women's World Cup
- Appearances: 1 (First in 2025)
- Best result: Quarter-finals (2025)

The Italy women's national futsal team (Italian: Nazionale italiana femminile di futsal) represents Italy in international women's futsal and is controlled by the Italian Football Federation (FIGC).

== History ==
In January 2015, the Italian Football Federation established the women's futsal national team. with Roberto Menichelli, who had previously managed the men's national team as a coach for the team. The Azzurre made its debut on June 25, 2015, at the Foro Italico in Rome, defeating Hungary 5–0 in a friendly match.

In 2017, Francesca Salvatore was appointed as the team head coach, while UEFA decided to boost the entire movement by promoting and officially launching the first-ever Women's Futsal European Championship. Italy was drawn into the qualifying group in Leganés, alongside host nation Spain, Poland, and Romania. The team finished second in the group but failed to secure a spot for the finals in Gondomar, Portugal.

== Results and fixtures ==
The following is a list of match results in the last 12 months, as well as any future matches that have been scheduled.

Legend

Win Draw Loss Fixture

=== 2023 ===
5 December Friendly	Italy	1–3	Spain	Scandicci, Italy

6 December Friendly	Italy	2–2	Spain	Scandicci, Italy

=== 2024 ===
9 January Friendly	Portugal	2–2	Italy	Entroncamento, Portugal

10 January Friendly	Portugal	1–1	Italy	Entroncamento, Portugal

20 February Friendly	Finland	2–5	Italy	Salo, Finaland

21 February Friendly	Italy	5–2	Sweden	Salo, Finaland

18 March Friendly	Italy	4–2	Ukraine	Taranto, Italy

19 March Friendly	Italy	6–0	Ukraine	Taranto, Italy

12 June Futsal Week Summer Cup	Italy	13–0	Greenland	Poreč, Croatia

13 June Futsal Week Summer Cup	Italy	3–2	Poland	Poreč, Croatia

15 June Futsal Week Summer Cup	Italy	7–2	Croatia	Poreč, Croatia
16:00	Boutimah 9', 19'; Grieco 15', 35'; Adamatti 18', 34'; Slavica 24' (o.g.)	Report	Duvnjak 1'; Lucić 21'

16 June Futsal Week Summer Cup	Italy	3–2	Poland	Poreč, Croatia
18:15	Adamatti 3'; Dal Maz 5'; Boutimah 22'	Report	Sobkowicz 29'; Bała 38'	Stadium: Finida Hall; Referee: Tuomi Rossa

10 September Friendly	Slovakia	1–4	Italy	Šamorín, Slovakia
18:30	Rybanská 22'	Report	Bettioli 15'; Dal Maz 19'; Ferrara 30', 31'	Stadium: X Bionik Sport Hall

11 September Friendly	Slovakia	0–10	Italy	Šamorín, Slovakia
12:30		Report	Adamatti 1', 30'; Borges Da Silva 3'; Boutimah 4', 21', 23', 37'; Dal Maz 26', 27'; Ghilardi 31'	Stadium: X Bionik Sport Hall

15 October 2025 World Cup qualifying	Italy	11–0	Lithuania	Vrnjačka Banja, Serbia
19:00	Borges Da Silva 3'38"; Mansueto 9'15", 25'42"; Dal Maz 16'54"; Boutimah 21'36", 32'56", 33'31", 38'18"; Berte' 22'51"; Adamatti 32'00"; Ferrara 40'24"	Report		Stadium: Sportska Hala; Attendance: 42; Referee: Marco Rothenfluh (Switzerland)

16 October 2025 World Cup qualifying	Croatia	0–4	Italy	Vrnjačka Banja, Serbia
16:00		Report	Borges Da Silva 3'49"; Berte' 4'34"; Boutimah 23'51"; Mansueto 38'13"	Stadium: Sportska Hala; Attendance: 39; Referee: Larisa Eleni Avramidou (Greece)

18 October 2025 World Cup qualifying	Serbia	0–12	Italy	Vrnjačka Banja, Serbia
19:00		Report	Adamatti 2'35", 30'27", 32'08"; Berte' 4'50", 26'44"; Grieco 7'45", 9'38", 15'04"; Borges Da Silva 21'37"; Boutimah 23'24"; Ferrara 28'41", 37'39"	Stadium: Sportska Hala; Attendance: 65; Referee: Admir Zahovič (Slovenia)

== Players ==
=== Current squad ===
- The following players were named to the squad for the 2025 FIFA Futsal Women's World Cup qualifiers main round matches against Lithuania, Croatia and Serbia on 15, 16 and 18 October 2024 respectively.

No.	Pos.	Player	Date of birth (age)	Caps	Goals	Club
1	GK	Ana Carolina Sestari	13 February 1996 (age 30)	37	1	(Italian Football Federation) Città di Falconara
22	GK	Denise Carturan	30 July 1997 (age 28)	14	0	(Italian Football Federation) Kick Off
–	GK	Anthea Polloni	8 August 2002 (age 23)	1	0	(Italian Football Federation) Cagliari
3	FP	Ludovica Coppari (Captain)	11 December 1998 (age 27)	52	8	(Italian Football Federation) Femminile Pescara
4	FP	Bruna Borges	25 February 1992 (age 34)	46	14	(Italian Football Federation) Kick Off
6	FP	Sara Boutimah	20 August 1995 (age 30)	38	38	(Italian Football Federation) TikiTaka Francavilla
7	FP	Alessia Grieco	15 March 1999 (age 27)	24	10	(Italian Football Federation) Bitonto
8	FP	Nicoletta Mansueto	24 April 1997 (age 29)	42	6	(Italian Football Federation) Bitonto
9	FP	Renata Adamatti	5 March 1993 (age 33)	23	20	(Italian Football Federation) Bitonto
10	FP	Gaby Vanelli	3 April 2000 (age 26)	2	2	(Italian Football Federation) Femminile Pescara
11	FP	Brenda Bettioli	27 December 1990 (age 35)	4	1	(Italian Football Federation) TikiTaka Francavilla
13	FP	Greta Ghilardi	6 October 2003 (age 22)	17	2	(Italian Football Federation) Kick Off
17	FP	Adrieli Berte'	16 March 1995 (age 31)	13	7	(Italian Football Federation) TikiTaka Francavilla
18	FP	Arianna Bovo	3 October 2000 (age 25)	20	0	(Italian Football Federation) Kick Off
19	FP	Rafaela Dal'Maz	31 January 1991 (age 35)	16	12	(Italian Football Federation) Femminile Pescara
20	FP	Erika Ferrara	16 July 1999 (age 26)	39	11	(Italian Football Federation) Città di Falconara
21	FP	Rebecca De Siena	17 October 2001 (age 24)	13	0	(Italian Football Federation) TikiTaka Francavilla

== Competitive record ==
=== FIFA Futsal Women's World Cup ===
FIFA Futsal Women's World Cup record									Qualification record					
Year	Round	Position	Pld	W	D*	L	GF	GA	Pld	W	D*	L	GF	GA
(Philippines) 2025	Quarter-finals	5th	4	2	0	2	23	14	6	5	0	1	38	9
Total	Quarter-finals	1/1	4	2	0	2	23	14	6	5	0	1	38	9
* Draws include knockout matches decided on penalty kicks.

=== UEFA Women's Futsal Championship ===
UEFA Women's Futsal Championship record									Qualifying record					
Year	Round	Position	Pld	W	D	L	GF	GA	Pld	W	D	L	GF	GA
(Portugal) 2019	Did not qualify								3	2	0	1	14	9
(Portugal) 2022	Did not qualify								3	2	0	1	15	5
(Hungary) 2023	Did not qualify								3	2	0	1	15	5
(Croatia) 2027	To be determined								To be determined					
Total	Best:	0/3	—	—	—	—	—	—	9	6	0	3	44	19
* Draws include knockout matches decided on penalty kicks.

=== Other tournaments ===
Tournament	Round	Position	Pld	W	D*	L	GF	GA
(Spain) 2016 Alcázar de San Juan Tournament	Fourth place	4th of 4	3	0	0	3	1	8
(Spain) 2017 Guadalajara Tournament	Fourth place	4th of 4	3	0	0	3	0	8
(Croatia) 2019 Futsal Week Summer Cup	Champions	1st of 4	3	3	0	0	24	5
(Ukraine) 2020 Freedom Cup	Champions	1st of 6	3	3	0	0	18	3
(Croatia) 2023 Futsal Week Summer Cup	Runners-up	2nd of 4	4	2	1	1	11	8
(Croatia) 2024 Futsal Week Summer Cup	Champions	1st of 6	4	4	0	0	26	6
* Draws include knockout matches decided on penalty kicks.

== See also ==
- Italy national futsal team
- Futsal in Italy
- Italy women's national football team
