= Slovenia women's national futsal team =

Slovenia
- Association: Football Association of Slovenia (Nogometna zveza Slovenije)
- Confederation: UEFA (Europe)
- FIFA code: SVN
- FIFA ranking: 46 (24 September 2026)
- Highest FIFA ranking: 50 (May 2024)
- Lowest FIFA ranking: 52 (October 2024)
Home colours	Away colours

First international
- Slovakia 3–3 Slovenia (Bratislava, Slovakia; 14 May 2018)

Biggest win
- Slovenia 11–1 Kazakhstan (Prienai, Lithuania; 12 May 2022)

Biggest defeat
- Portugal 13–0 Slovenia (Funchal, Portugal; 24 October 2018)

The Slovenia women's national futsal team (Slovene: Slovenska ženska futsal reprezentanca) represents Slovenia in international futsal competitions and is controlled by the Football Association of Slovenia.

== History ==
Established in 2018, the team held its first camp in March 2018 ahead of their qualifying campaign for the UEFA Women's Futsal Euro 2019 in September of the same year. On 14 May 2018, the team played its first international match against Slovakia, ending in a 3–3 draw. The following day, they secured their first win, defeating Slovakia 4–3. In September 2018, they played the inaugural Euro qualifiers but lost all their matches. The same outcome occurred in the 2021 qualifiers. It wasn't until 2022 that they won a qualifying game, remaining undefeated in their Preliminary round group and securing their biggest win, a 11–1 victory over Kazakhstan.

== Results and Fixtures ==
- The following is a list of match results in the last 12 months, as well as any future matches that have been scheduled.

Legend

Win Draw Lose Fixture

20 February Friendly	Slovenia	2–2	France	Celje, Slovenia

21 February Friendly	Slovenia	1–3	France	Slovenske Konjice, Slovenia

13 September Friendly	Slovenia	1–4	Hungary	Gornja Radgona, Slovenia

15 September Friendly	Hungary	2–0	Slovenia	Nagykanizsa, Hungary

27 September Friendly	Croatia	7–3	Slovenia	Zagreb, Croatia

27 September Friendly	Slovenia	3–1	Croatia	Maribor, Slovenia

16 October 2025 FIFA World Cup qualificiation	Slovenia	7–0	Moldova	Ciorescu, Moldova

17 October 2025 FIFA World Cup qualificiation	Slovenia	0–4	Finland	Ciorescu, Moldova

19 October 2025 FIFA World Cup qualificiation	England	2–4	Slovenia	Ciorescu, Moldova

== Players ==
=== Current squad ===
The following players were named for the 2025 FIFA Futsal Women's World Cup qualifiers main round against England, Finland and Moldova on 16 , 17 and 19 October 2024.

No.	Pos.	Player	Date of birth (age)	Caps	Goals	Club
1	GK	Barbara Lah	7 April 1992 (age 34)	38	0	(Football Association of Slovenia) ŠD Bloke
12	GK	Sanela Balić (Captain)	1 January 1999 (age 27)	21	0	(Football Association of Slovenia) ŠD Košana
22	GK	Veronika Rovan	3 October 2005 (age 21)	9	0	(Football Association of Slovenia) ŽNK Celje
2	FP	Maša Novak	16 October 1998 (age 27)	22	4	(Football Association of Slovenia) ŽNK Vrhnika
3	FP	Nika Trdan	15 October 2002 (age 23)	13	0	(Football Association of Slovenia) ŽNK Celje
4	FP	Ines Ermenc	4 December 2001 (age 24)	33	10	(Football Association of Slovenia) ŽNK Celje
5	FP	Vanja Tanšek	12 June 1996 (age 30)	33	0	(Football Association of Slovenia) ŽNK Celje
6	FP	Tina Jesenovec	26 March 1996 (age 30)	28	6	(Football Association of Slovenia) ŠD Košana
7	FP	Anja Ložar	12 May 2000 (age 26)	47	8	(Football Association of Slovenia) ŽNK Celje
8	FP	Rebeka Šnofl	10 December 1998 (age 27)	41	2	(Football Association of Slovenia) ŽNK Celje
9	FP	Anja Žvokelj	30 October 2001 (age 24)	28	13	(Football Association of Slovenia) ŠD Košana
10	FP	Teja Keržič	29 August 2000 (age 26)	9	0	(Football Association of Slovenia) ŠD Košana
11	FP	Deja Adamič	25 January 2001 (age 25)	24	3	(Football Association of Slovenia) ŽNK Celje
14	FP	Maja Srebot	31 October 2000 (age 25)	13	0	(Football Association of Slovenia) ŠD Košana
–	FP	Tisa Podkrajšek	15 July 2006 (age 20)	2	0	(Football Association of Slovenia) FK Lukovica
–	FP	Tanja Vrabel	22 December 1990 (age 35)	14	9	(Football Association of Slovenia) ŽNK Celje
–	FP	Patricija Ham	6 September 2003 (age 23)	0	0	(Football Association of Slovenia) ŽNK Vrhnika

== Competitive record ==
=== FIFA Futsal Women's World Cup ===
FIFA Futsal Women's World Cup record									Qualification record					
Year	Round	Position	Pld	W	D*	L	GF	GA	Pld	W	D*	L	GF	GA
(Philippines) 2025	Did not qualify								3	2	0	1	11	6
Total	Best: —	0/0	—	—	—	—	—	—	3	2	0	1	11	6
* Draws include knockout matches decided on penalty kicks.

=== UEFA Women's Futsal Championship ===
UEFA Women's Futsal Championship record									Qualifying record					
Year	Round	Position	Pld	W	D*	L	GF	GA	Pld	W	D*	L	GF	GA
(Portugal) 2019	Did not qualify								3	0	0	3	3	16
(Portugal) 2022	Did not qualify								3	0	0	3	3	15
(Hungary) 2023	Did not qualify								6	3	1	2	26	25
(Croatia) 2027	Did not qualify								6	2	0	4	15	24
Total	Best:	0/4	—	—	—	—	—	—	18	5	1	12	47	80
* Draws include knockout matches decided on penalty kicks.

== See also ==
- Futsal in Slovenia
- Slovenia women's national football team
