= Sweden women's national futsal team =

Sweden
- Association: Swedish Football Association
- Confederation: UEFA (Europe)
- Head coach: Mufad Bajraktarevic
- Asst coach: Patrik Persson
- FIFA code: SWE
- FIFA ranking: 18 (24 September 2026)
Home colours	Away colours

First international
- Sweden 2–2 Czech Republic (Örebro, Sweden; 1 April 2018)

Biggest win
- Sweden 9–1 France (Varberg, Sweden; 16 May 2024)

Biggest defeat
- Portugal 9–0 Sweden (Montesilvano, Italy; 19 March 2025)

European Championship
- Appearances: 0

The Sweden women's national futsal team represents Sweden in international futsal competitions and is controlled by the Swedish Football Association. The team was formed in January 2018 and played its first official matches in April 2018 against Czech Republic.

== Tournament records ==
=== FIFA Futsal Women's World Cup ===
FIFA Futsal Women's World Cup record
Year	Round	Position	GP	W	D	L	GS	GA
(Philippines) 2025	Did not qualify							
Total	–	0/1	0	0	0	0	0	0

=== UEFA Women's Futsal Championship ===
UEFA European Futsal Championship record									Qualification record					
Year	Round	Position	Pld	W	D	L	GF	GA	Pld	W	D	L	GF	GA
(Portugal) 2019	Did not qualify								6	4	1	1	30	16
(Portugal) 2022	Did not qualify								3	1	0	2	7	13
(Hungary) 2023	Did not qualify								3	1	1	1	7	11
(Croatia) 2027	Qualified								3	2	0	1	11	5
Total	–	–	–	–	–	–	–	–	15	8	2	5	55	45

== Matches ==
=== 2018 ===
1 April 2018 Friendly	Sweden	2–2	Czech Republic	Örebro, Sweden
	Miskulin 32'; Chamoun 40'	Report	Stanjurová 16'; Kopliková 27'	Stadium: Idrottshuset; Attendance: 315; Referee: Filip Nesnera (Czech Republic)

2 April 2018 Friendly	Sweden	2–1	Czech Republic	Örebro, Sweden
	Chamoun 21'; Hylová 23' (o.g.)	Report	Svobodová 13'	Stadium: Idrottshuset; Attendance: 239; Referee: Ademir Avdic (Sweden)

17 July 2018 Friendly	Finland	3–4	Sweden	Tampere, Finland
	Hannula 13'; Setälä 24'; Sutinen 34'	Report	Kiryo 3'; Chamoun 15'; Vaseghpanah 25'; Aguilar 34' (pen.)	Stadium: Tesoman Palloiluhalli; Attendance: 573; Referee: Naishouler Kirill (Finland)

18 July 2018 Friendly	Finland	4–5	Sweden	Tampere, Finland
	Jokisalo 9'; Keränen 13'; Juntikka 37'; Pöyry 38'	Report	Kogsta 2'; Jansson 9'; Chamoun 23'; Kiryo 34'; Vaseghpanah 35'	Stadium: Tesoman Palloiluhalli; Referee: Lovisa Johansson (Sweden)

21 August 2018 2019 ECH Q	Netherlands	4–5	Sweden	Newry, Northern Ireland
	de Vos 14:29; Oliveira 20:21; Huizinga 37:13, 38:04	Report	Vaseghpanah 8:35, 36:40; Chamoun 22:26; Jansson 26:42; Kogsta 28:03	Stadium: Newry Leisure Centre; Referee: Adrian Tschopp (Switzerland)

22 August 2018 2019 ECH Q	Northern Ireland	3–8	Sweden	Newry, Northern Ireland
	Weatherall 6:14; Harkness 31:32; McKay 40:17	Report	Vaseghpanah 5:42, 14:42; Chamoun 11:54, 19:45; Varli 22:03, 23:12; Aguilar 29:20, 35:56	Stadium: Newry Leisure Centre; Referee: Arttu Kyynäräinen (Finland)

24 August 2018 2019 ECH Q	Sweden	8–3	Belgium	Newry, Northern Ireland
	Varli 14:46, 20:42, 32:14; Vaseghpanah 19:35 (pen.), 22:22; Aguilar 28:48; Chamoun (35:38); Olofsson Hjelm (38:38)	Report	Toloba 2:20, 18:57 (pen.); Bourtembourg 19:15	Stadium: Newry Leisure Centre; Referee: Daniel Deca (Romania)

12 September 2018 2019 ECH Q	Russia	2–2	Sweden	Karlovac, Croatia
	Fedorova 30:35; Vorobey 31:43	Report	Chamoun 7:55, 35:56	Stadium: Mladost Hall; Referee: Ingus Puriņš (Latvia)

13 September 2018 2019 ECH Q	Croatia	3–2	Sweden	Karlovac, Croatia
	Matijevic 22:35, 36:38; Nemčić 26:54	Report	Olofsson Hjelm 19:53; Varli 20:48	Stadium: Mladost Hall; Referee: Vlad Nicolae Ciobanu (Romania)

15 September 2018 2019 ECH Q	Sweden	5–1	Slovenia	Karlovac, Croatia
	Kogsta 20:32, 29:48; Varli 25:06; Poli 34:46; Olofsson Hjelm 37:29		Vrabel 17:39	Stadium: Mladost Hall; Referee: Vlad Nicolae Ciobanu (Romania)

=== 2019 ===
20 February 2019 Friendly	Czech Republic	3–5	Sweden	Hodonín, Czech Republic
	Odehnalová 23'; Kopliková 25'; Spicková 37'		Vaseghpanah 6'; Chamoun 6', 33'; Österberg 30'; Kogsta 40'	Stadium: TEZA Hodonín Sportovní Hala; Attendance: 400

21 February 2019 Friendly	Czech Republic	4–3	Sweden	Hodonín, Czech Republic
	Spicková 12', 23'; Skálová 24'; Odehnalová 38'		Vaseghpanah 12', 27'; 40' (o.g.)	Stadium: TEZA Hodonín Sportovní Hala

2 April 2019 Friendly	Sweden	3–2	Italy	Vetlanda, Sweden
				Stadium: Iscar Arena; Attendance: 519

3 April 2019 Friendly	Sweden	3–9	Italy	Vetlanda, Sweden
				Stadium: Iscar Arena; Attendance: 555

25 October 2019 Friendly	Sweden	1–6	Russia	Alingsås, Sweden
				Stadium: Estrad Alingsås; Attendance: 1,015

26 October 2019 Friendly	Sweden	0–7	Russia	Alingsås, Sweden
				Stadium: Estrad Alingsås; Attendance: 1,020

=== 2023 ===
4 February 2023 Friendly	Gibraltar	0–5	Sweden	Gibraltar, Gibraltar
18:00 UTC+1		Report	Elia 6:20; Kiryo 7:00, 31:36; Rolin 13:09; Jensen 30:26	Stadium: Tercentenary Sports Hall

5 February 2023 Friendly	Gibraltar	0–5	Sweden	Gibraltar, Gibraltar
17:00 UTC+1		Report	Jansson; Larsson; Glans; Vaggelyr; (o.g.)	Stadium: Tercentenary Sports Hall

17 March 2023 Friendly	Czech Republic	v	Sweden	Czech Republic
--:--

18 March 2023 Friendly	Czech Republic	v	Sweden	Czech Republic
--:--

=== All-time team record ===
Against	Played	Won	Drawn	Lost	GF	GA	GD
Belgium	1	1	0	0	8	3	+5
Croatia	1	0	0	1	2	3	–1
Czech Republic	4	2	1	1	12	10	+2
Finland	2	2	0	0	9	7	+2
Italy	2	1	0	1	6	11	–5
Netherlands	1	1	0	0	5	4	+1
Northern Ireland	1	1	0	0	8	3	+5
Russia	3	0	1	2	3	15	–12
Slovenia	1	1	0	0	5	1	+4
Total	16	9	2	5	58	57	+1

== Players ==
=== Notable players ===
- Nazanin Vaseghpanah
- Isabel Maria Aguilar
