= Paulina Potapova =

Lithuanian footballer

Personal information
- Date of birth: 5 October 1999 (age 27)
- Position: Forward

International career^{‡}
Years	Team	Apps	(Gls)
- Lithuania
- ‡ National team caps and goals as of 19:43, 30 August 2019 (UTC)

Paulina Potapova (born 5 October 1999) is a Lithuanian footballer who plays as a forward and has appeared for the Lithuania women's national team.

== Career ==
Potapova has been capped for the Lithuania national team, appearing for the team during the 2019 FIFA Women's World Cup qualifying cycle.
