= Belarus women's national futsal team =

Belarus
- Association: Football Federation of Belarus
- Confederation: UEFA (Europe)
- Head coach: Sergei Kouznesov
- FIFA code: BLR
- FIFA ranking: 60 ▼3 (8 May 2026)
- Highest FIFA ranking: 41 (October 2024)
- Lowest FIFA ranking: 42 (May 2024)
Home colours	Away colours

First international
- Belarus 1–0 Lithuania (Grodno, Belarus; 24 April 2018)

Biggest win
- Belarus 8–0 Kazakhstan (Cherkasy, Ukraine; 12 September 2018)

Biggest defeat
- Portugal 14–0 Belarus (Fafe, Portugal; 20 October 2022)

The Belarus women's national futsal team (Belarusian: Жаночая зборная Беларусі па футзале) represents Belarus in international futsal competitions and is governed by the Football Federation of Belarus (ABFF).

== History ==
Belarus played its first match against Lithuania on 24 April 2018, in Grodno. The game ended in a 1–0 victory. Four months after this debut, the team competed in the qualifiers for the inaugural UEFA Women's Futsal Euro. Starting from the preliminary round, the team topped its group to advance to the main round, where they secured just one victory—an 8-0 win over Kazakhstan, their biggest to date. In the following two editions, having automatically started from the main round, they failed to qualify for the finals.

Belarus entered the European qualifiers for the inaugural 2025 FIFA Futsal Women's World Cup. Placed in Group 2, hosted in Bosnia and Herzegovina, the team failed to advance to the Elite Round.

== Results and fixtures ==
The following is a list of match results in the last 12 months, as well as any future matches that have been scheduled.

Legend

Win Draw Lose Fixture

=== 2024 ===
16 October 2025 FIFA World Cup qualifying	Belarus	4–7	Bosnia and Herzegovina	Sarajevo, Bosnia and Herzegovina
16:00 UTC+1	Sidorchuk 20'03", 21'31"; Kharitonchik 23'37"; Duben 39'29"	Report	Ćesko 6'42", 39'51"; Vujadin 7'35", 20'45"; Mujanović 16'18"; Piskić 17'42"; Kamerić 25'11"	Stadium: Sports Hall East Sarajevo; Attendance: 70; Referee: Daniele D'adamo (SMR); Alice Vévodvá (CZE)

17 October 2025 FIFA World Cup qualifying	Belarus	0–6	Hungary	Sarajevo, Bosnia and Herzegovina
26:00 UTC+1		Report	C. Krascsenics 2'29", 9'09"; Gajzágó 12'23", 31'33"; Fábián 16'21"; Hardon 39'12"	Stadium: Sports Hall East Sarajevo; Attendance: 30; Referee: Zviad Bliadze (GEO); Daniele D'adamo (SMR)

19 October 2025 FIFA World Cup qualifying	Norway	4–1	Belarus	Sarajevo, Bosnia and Herzegovina
20:00 UTC+1	Van Der Weel 11'31"; Halgunset 12'37" (pen.), 16'31" (pen.); Meyer 32'51"	Report	Igrusha 10'23"	Stadium: Sports Hall East Sarajevo; Attendance: 50; Referee: Alice Vévodvá (CZE); Zviad Bliadze (GEO)

== Players ==
=== Current squad ===
The following 14 players were called up for the 2025 FIFA World Cup qualifying matches from 16 to 19 October 2024.

No.	Pos.	Player	Date of birth (age)	Club
1	GK	Safiya Metelskaya	25 October 2006 (age 19)	
16	GK	Ekaterina Kamlyuk	26 July 1996 (age 29)	
7	DF	Katsiaryna Yanchylenka	21 August 1996 (age 29)	
9	DF	Miroslava Zubko	8 August 2001 (age 24)	
10	DF	Yuliya Duben	25 November 1996 (age 29)	
11	DF	Alina Vasilyeva	11 December 1985 (age 40)	
15	DF	Karolina Zhitko	22 November 1999 (age 26)	
17	DF	Natallia Asmykovich	29 January 2003 (age 23)	
2	FW	Anastasiya Sidorchuk	19 January 2001 (age 25)	
3	FW	Anastasiya Igrusha	15 April 2001 (age 25)	
4	FW	Viktoryia Sidarchuk	25 May 2000 (age 26)	
13	FW	Valeriya Kharitonchik	30 August 2002 (age 23)	
14	FW	Evgeniya Kasyanik	20 March 1991 (age 35)	
18	FW	Darya Linnik	13 October 2005 (age 20)	

== Competitive record ==
=== FIFA Futsal Women's World Cup ===
FIFA Futsal Women's World Cup record									Qualification record					
Year	Round	Position	Pld	W	D*	L	GF	GA	Pld	W	D*	L	GF	GA
(Philippines) 2025	Did not qualify								3	0	0	3	5	17
Total	Best: —	0/1	—	—	—	—	—	—	3	1	0	2	9	15

*Draws include knockout matches decided on penalty kicks.

=== UEFA Women's Futsal Championship ===
UEFA Women's Futsal Championship record									Qualifying record					
Year	Round	Position	Pld	W	D*	L	GF	GA	Pld	W	D*	L	GF	GA
(Portugal) 2019	Did not qualify								5	2	1	2	21	13
(Portugal) 2022	Did not qualify								3	0	0	3	5	20
(Hungary) 2023	Did not qualify								3	0	1	2	3	23
(Croatia) 2027	Did not qualify								3	1	0	2	6	8
Total	Best:	0/4	—	—	—	—	—	—	14	3	2	9	35	64

*Draws include knockout matches decided on penalty kicks.

== See also ==
- Belarus women's national football team
