= Hungary women's national futsal team =

Hungary
- Association: Hungarian Football Federation (MLSZ) (Hungarian: Magyar Labdarúgó Szövetség)
- Confederation: UEFA (Europe)
- Head coach: Tamás Frank
- FIFA code: HUN
- FIFA ranking: 23 (24 September 2026)
- Highest FIFA ranking: 23 (May–October 2024)
- Lowest FIFA ranking: 23 (May–October 2024)
Home colours	Away colours

First international
- Hungary 4–2 Czech Republic (Ózd, Hungary; 15 October 2008)

Biggest win
- Hungary 6–0 Slovakia (Szigetszentmiklós, Hungary; 12 October 2024); Hungary 6–0 Belarus (Sarajevo, Bosnia-Herzegovina; 17 October 2024)

Biggest defeat
- Hungary 0–12 Portugal (Debrecen, Hungary; 19 March 2023)

European Championship
- Appearances: 2 (First in 2022)
- Best result: Fourth place (2022, 2023)

The Hungary women's national futsal team (Hungarian: Magyar Női Futsalválogatott) represents Hungary in international women's futsal and is controlled by the Hungarian Football Federation.

== History ==
In the absence of major women's futsal competitions and with limited national teams in the continent, Hungary emerged as one of the earliest European nations to establish a women's futsal team in 2008. On 15 October 2008, Hungary made its international debut by defeating the Czech Republic 4–2 in a friendly match held in Ózd.

From their inception until 2018, the team primarily took part in regional tournaments, competing six times in Russia's Victory Day Women's Cup and winning the Ostrava Three Nations Tournaments in both 2014 and 2015.

In 2018, following UEFA's establishment of the UEFA Women's Futsal Championship, Hungary entered the qualifying tournament. They were placed in Group 3, hosted by Ukraine, who edged them out for the final spot on goal difference after both teams finished with 7 points. In the second edition in 2022, Hungary was in a group with Russia, Belarus, and the Netherlands. Although they initially did not qualify after two wins and one loss, they advanced to their first-ever UEFA Women's Futsal Euro after Russia's suspension. In the finals, they lost to Portugal in the semifinals and to Ukraine in the third-place playoff, finishing in fourth place. After qualifying for the third edition, which they hosted, the team had a similar performance, losing in both the semifinals and the third-place match, this time suffering a 12–0 defeat to Portugal, marking their biggest loss in history.

== Results and fixtures ==
- The following is a list of match results in the last 12 months, as well as any future matches that have been scheduled.

Win Draw Lose Cancellation or Postponement Fixture

=== 2023 ===
18 November Friendly	Hungary	0–2	Poland	Dunakeszi, Hungary

19 November Friendly	Hungary	0–1	Poland	Dunakeszi, Hungary

=== 2024 ===
14 March Futsal Love Winter Cup	Serbia	2–6	Hungary	Vrnjačka Banja, Serbia

15 March Futsal Love Winter Cup	Hungary	3–1	Slovakia	Vrnjačka Banja, Serbia

16 March Futsal Love Winter Cup	Hungary	2–1	Czech Republic	Vrnjačka Banja, Serbia

18 March Futsal Love Winter Cup	France	4–2	Hungary	Vrnjačka Banja, Serbia

13 September Friendly	Slovenia	1–4	Hungary	Gornja Radgona, Slovenia

15 September Friendly	Hungary	2–0	Slovenia	Nagykanizsa, Hungary

12 October Friendly	Hungary	6–0	Slovakia	Szigetczentmiklós, Hungary

16 October 2025 World Cup qualifying	Hungary	3–2	Norway	Sarajevo, Bosnia and Herzegovina

17 October 2025 World Cup qualifying	Belarus	0–6	Hungary	Sarajevo, Bosnia and Herzegovina

19 October 2025 World Cup qualifying	Bosnia and Herzegovina	0–0	Hungary	Sarajevo, Bosnia and Herzegovina

== Players ==
=== Current squad ===
- The following players were named for the 2025 FIFA World Cup qualifying matches against Norway, Belarus and Bosnia and Herzegovina on 16, 17 and 19 October 2024.

No.	Pos.	Player	Date of birth (age)	Club
1	GK	Lilla Torma	16 December 1995 (age 30)	
12	GK	Vanda Deczki	19 September 1993 (age 33)	
2	DF	Vivien Tagyi	4 June 1997 (age 29)	
3	DF	Dalma Wiesner	10 May 2003 (age 23)	
5	DF	Zsuzsanna Folk	19 May 1994 (age 32)	
6	DF	Diána Fülöp	28 March 1989 (age 37)	
11	DF	Viktória Horváth	12 January 2001 (age 25)	
13	DF	Adél Varga	21 July 1989 (age 37)	
4	FW	Rebeka Fábián	3 July 1995 (age 31)	
7	FW	Rita Hardon	10 March 2006 (age 20)	
8	FW	Gréta Kiss	5 December 2005 (age 20)	
9	FW	Anikó Nagy	21 February 2001 (age 25)	
10	FW	Csilla Krascsenics	6 April 1998 (age 28)	
15	FW	Flóra Gajzágó	11 July 2002 (age 24)	

== Competitive record ==
=== FIFA Futsal Women's World Cup ===
FIFA Futsal Women's World Cup record									Qualification record					
Year	Round	Position	Pld	W	D*	L	GF	GA	Pld	W	D*	L	GF	GA
(Philippines) 2025	Did not qualify								3	2	1	0	9	2
Total	Best: —	0/0	—	—	—	—	—	—	3	2	1	0	9	2
* Draws include knockout matches decided on penalty kicks.

=== UEFA Women's Futsal Championship ===
UEFA Women's Futsal Championship record									Qualifying record					
Year	Round	Position	Pld	W	D*	L	GF	GA	Pld	W	D*	L	GF	GA
(Portugal) 2019	Did not qualify								3	2	1	0	16	11
(Portugal) 2022	Fourth place	4th of 4	2	0	0	2	1	8	3	2	0	1	8	8
(Hungary) 2023	Fourth place	4th of 4	2	0	0	2	1	14	3	2	1	0	7	3
(Croatia) 2027	Qualified								3	3	0	0	7	2
Total	Best: Fourth place	2/3	4	0	0	2	2	22	12	9	2	1	38	24
* Draws include knockout matches decided on penalty kicks.

=== Other tournaments ===
Tournament	Round	Position	Pld	W	D*	L	GF	GA
(Russia) 2010 Victory Day Women's Cup	Third place	3rd of 4	3	1	0	2	6	13
(Hungary) 2011 Wekerle Sándor Tournament	Third place	3rd of 3	2	0	0	2	1	12
(Russia) 2011 Victory Day Women's Cup	Fourth place	4th of 4	3	0	1	2	1	12
(Russia) 2012 Victory Day Women's Cup	Fourth place	4th of 4	3	0	1	2	3	12
(Russia) 2013 Victory Day Women's Cup	Third place	3rd of 4	3	0	2	1	2	10
(Russia) 2014 Victory Day Women's Cup	Fourth place	4th of 4	3	0	0	3	1	12
(Czech Republic) 2014 Ostrava 3 Nations Tournament	Champions	1st of 3	2	1	1	0	7	2
(Czech Republic) 2015 Ostrava 3 Nations Tournament	Champions	1st of 3	2	2	0	0	10	2
(Russia) 2018 Victory Day Women's Cup	Fourth place	4th of 4	3	0	0	3	5	15
(Czech Republic) 2018 Ostrava 3 Nations Tournament	Third place	3rd of 3	2	0	0	2	3	5
(Czech Republic) 2019 Visegrad Cup	Champions	1st of 3	2	2	0	0	11	3
(Ukraine) 2020 Freedom Cup	Fifth place	5th of 6	3	0	2	1	2	6
(Croatia) 2022 Futsal Week Summer Cup	Fourth place	4th of 5	4	1	2	1	7	6
2024 Futsal Love Serbia Winter Cup	Runners-up	2nd of 5	4	3	0	1	13	8
* Draws include knockout matches decided on penalty kicks.

== See also ==
- Hungary women's national football team
