= Czech Republic women's national futsal team =

Czech Republic
- Association: Football Association of the Czech Republic (Fotbalová asociace České republiky)
- Confederation: UEFA (Europe)
- Most caps: Gabriela Špičková (45)
- Top scorer: Denisa Skálová (20)
- FIFA code: CZE
- FIFA ranking: 36 (24 September 2026)
- Highest FIFA ranking: 57 (October 2024)
- Lowest FIFA ranking: 58 (May 2024)
Home colours	Away colours

First international
- Hungary 4–2 Czech Republic (Ózd, Hungary; 15 October 2008)

Biggest win
- Czech Republic 7–0 Serbia (Oliveira de Azeméis, Portugal; 13 September 2018)

Biggest defeat
- Portugal 12–0 Czech Republic (Oliveira de Azeméis, Portugal; 12 September 2018)

The Czech Republic women's national futsal team (Czech: Česká futsalová reprezentace žen) represents the Czech Republic in international futsal competitions and is controlled by the Football Association of the Czech Republic.

== History ==
Established in 2008, the team was among the first in Europe. The team played its first international match on 15 October 2008 against Hungary. With no official competitions until 2018, the team primarily participated in friendly matches and tournaments. After the establishment of the UEFA Women's Futsal Euro in 2018, the Czech Republic participated in the qualifying round for the inaugural edition. However, after losing two out of three matches, they failed to qualify for the tournament. The same outcome occurred again, with the Czech Republic failing to qualify for the 2022 and 2023 editions.

After the establishment of the FIFA Women's Futsal World Cup in 2024, the country hosted one of the qualifying groups for the inaugural edition but failed to qualify.

== Results and fixtures ==
- The following is a list of match results in the last 12 months, as well as any future matches that have been scheduled.

Legend

Win Draw Lose Fixture

=== 2024 ===
14 March Futsal Love Serbia Cup	Czech Republic	2–2	France	Vrnjačka Banja, Serbia

15 March Futsal Love Serbia Cup	Serbia	0–4	Czech Republic	Vrnjačka Banja, Serbia

16 March Futsal Love Serbia Cup	Hungary	2–1	Czech Republic	Vrnjačka Banja, Serbia

17 March Futsal Love Serbia Cup	Czech Republic	3–0	Slovakia	Vrnjačka Banja, Serbia

11 September Friendly	Czech Republic	3–3	Norway	Teplice, Czech Republic

12 September Friendly	Czech Republic	2–2	Norway	Teplice, Czech Republic

16 October 2025 World Cup qualifying	Northern Ireland	0–6	Czech Republic	Teplice, Czech Republic

17 October 2025 World Cup qualifying	Czech Republic	2–2	France	Teplice, Czech Republic

19 October 2025 World Cup qualifying	Czech Republic	1–4	Ukraine	Teplice, Czech Republic

5 December Friendly	Morocco	3–1	Czech Republic	Salé, Morocco

6 December Friendly	Morocco	1–2	Czech Republic	Salé, Morocco

=== 2025 ===
12 February Friendly	Hungary	v	Czech Republic	Hungary

14 February Friendly	Hungary	v	Czech Republic	Hungary

== Players ==
=== Current squad ===
- The following 14 players were called up for the Friendly matches against Hungary on 12 and 14 February 2025.
- Caps and goals are correct as of 6 December 2024, after the match against Morocco.

No.	Pos.	Player	Date of birth (age)	Caps	Goals	Club
–	GK	Eliška Melounová	16 March 2006 (age 20)	8	0	(Football Association of the Czech Republic) SK Viktoria Tequilky Chlebičov
–	GK	Šárka Skřepská		0	0	(Football Association of the Czech Republic) Nástěnky Brno
–	FP	Denisa Fedorková	21 December 1997 (age 28)	13	1	(Football Association of the Czech Republic) FC Praha
–	FP	Monika Hlaváčová	13 October 2005 (age 20)	7	1	(Football Association of the Czech Republic) Nástěnky Brno
–	FP	Tereza Honková	19 June 1997 (age 29)	32	5	(Football Association of the Czech Republic) AC Gamaspol Jeseník
–	FP	Denisa Kabourková	28 September 1998 (age 28)	16	0	(Football Association of the Czech Republic) SK Interobal Plzeň
–	FP	Tereza Krejčová	9 September 1999 (age 27)	25	1	(Football Association of the Czech Republic) SK Interobal Plzeň
–	FP	Eliška Kretschmann		4	0	(Football Association of the Czech Republic) FC Baník Ostrava
–	FP	Tereza Lébrová	25 April 1995 (age 31)	4	0	(Football Association of the Czech Republic) SK Slavia Praha
–	FP	Clara Soquessa	7 September 1997 (age 29)	36	7	(Football Association of the Czech Republic) KS Uniwersytet Jagielloński
–	FP	Gabriela Špičková	21 September 1996 (age 30)	45	8	(Football Association of the Czech Republic) Nástěnky Brno
–	FP	Adéla Šturmová	18 July 1994 (age 32)	35	7	(Football Association of the Czech Republic) SK Interobal Plzeň
–	FP	Kamila Švábová	14 June 2000 (age 26)	11	0	(Football Association of the Czech Republic) SK Interobal Plzeň
–	FP	Jessica Vargová	26 August 1999 (age 27)	12	3	(Football Association of the Czech Republic) FC Praha

=== Recent call-ups ===
- The following players have also been called up to a Czech Republic squad within the last 12 months.

Pos.	Player	Date of birth (age)	Caps	Goals	Club	Latest call-up
GK	Olga Marešová	9 July 1999 (age 27)	24	0	(Czech Republic)	v. Northern Ireland, 16 October 2024
DF	Jana Beštová	25 August 1993 (age 33)	15	4	(Czech Republic)	v. Northern Ireland, 16 October 2024
FW	Denisa Skálová	25 October 1998 (age 27)	36	20	(Czech Republic)	v. Northern Ireland, 16 October 2024
FW	Karolína Cardová	28 May 2001 (age 25)	12	3	(Czech Republic)	v. Northern Ireland, 16 October 2024
FW	Jana Soušková	9 November 1993 (age 32)	33	9	(Czech Republic)	v. Northern Ireland, 16 October 2024
FW	Kristýna Komárková	15 May 2000 (age 26)	11	4	(Czech Republic)	v. Northern Ireland, 16 October 2024

== Records ==
As of 6 December 2024

*Players in bold are still active, at least at club level.

=== Most capped players ===
#	Player	Year(s)	Caps	Goals
1	**Gabriela Špičková**	2014–present	45	8
2	Iva Odehnalová	2014–2021	44	9
3	Lenka Kuglerová	2015–2021	37	0
4	**Denisa Skálová**	2015–present	36	20
5	**Clara Soquessa**	2017–present	36	7
6	Markéta Koplíková	2016–2021	36	9
7	**Adéla Šturmová**	2019–present	35	7
8	Barbora Hýlová	2008–2019	33	9
9	**Jana Soušková**	2018–present	33	9
10	Tereza Honková	2018–2022	32	5

=== Top goalscorers ===
#	Player	Year(s)	Goals	Caps
1	**Denisa Skálová**	2015–present	20	36
2	Barbora Hýlová	2008–2019	9	33
3	**Jana Soušková**	2018–present	9	33
4	Iva Odehnalová	2014–2021	9	44
5	Markéta Koplíková	2016–2021	9	36
6	**Gabriela Špičková**	2014–present	8	45
7	Eliška Stanjurová	2016–2018	7	17
8	**Clara Soquessa**	2017–present	7	36
9	**Adéla Šturmová**	2019–present	7	35
10	Sára Plzáková	2013–2018	5	12

== Competitive record ==
=== FIFA Futsal Women's World Cup ===
FIFA Futsal Women's World Cup record									Qualification record					
Year	Round	Position	Pld	W	D*	L	GF	GA	Pld	W	D*	L	GF	GA
(Philippines) 2025	Did not qualify								3	1	1	1	9	6
Total	Best: —	0/1	—	—	—	—	—	—	3	1	1	1	9	6

*Draws include knockout matches decided on penalty kicks.

=== UEFA Women's Futsal Championship ===
UEFA Women's Futsal Championship record									Qualifying record					
Year	Round	Position	Pld	W	D*	L	GF	GA	Pld	W	D*	L	GF	GA
(Portugal) 2019	Did not qualify								3	1	0	2	9	18
(Portugal) 2022	Did not qualify								3	0	0	3	5	11
(Hungary) 2023	Did not qualify								3	0	1	2	6	10
(Croatia) 2027	Did not qualify								6	2	0	4	13	17
Total	Best:	0/4	—	—	—	—	—	—	15	3	1	11	33	56

*Draws include knockout matches decided on penalty kicks.

== See also ==
- Czech Republic women's national football team
