= Ciorescu =

- Commune
- Location within Moldova
- Coordinates: 47°07′46″N 28°53′08″E
- Country: Moldova
- County: Chișinău
- Settled: 1912
- Commune: Ciorescu
- Boroughs: villages: Ciorescu; Făurești; Goian

Government
  - Mayor: Ivan Scripnic (Ind.)

Area
  - Total: 6.03 km^{2} (2.33 sq mi)

Population (2024)
  - Total: 6,714
  - Density: 1,110/km^{2} (2,880/sq mi)
- Time zone: UTC+2 (EET)
  - Summer (DST): UTC+3 (EEST)
- Postal code: MD-2089
- Area code: +373 22
- Website: www.ciorescu.com

Ciorescu, formerly known as Cricova Nouă, is a commune in Moldova, located 14 kilometres (8.7 mi) in the north-east of Chișinău, the capital of Moldova. The commune is part of the Rîșcani sector of the Chișinău municipality. It is composed of three villages: Ciorescu, Făurești and Goian.

== Demographics ==
According to the 2024 census, 6,714 inhabitants lived in the commune of Ciorescu, an increase compared to the previous census in 2014, when 5,961 inhabitants were registered.

Ethnic composition of Ciorescu (2024)
1. Moldovans (Note: There is an ongoing controversy regarding the ethnic identification of Moldovans and Romanians.) (82.4%)
2. Romanians (9.60%)
3. Ukrainians (4.00%)
4. Russians (2.50%)
5. Others (1.40%)
Linguistic composition of Ciorescu (2024)
1. Romanian (51.5%)
2. Moldovan (Note: In March 2023, the Parliament of Moldova passed a law updating all legislative texts and the constitution to refer to the national language as Romanian, effectively rendering the term "Moldovan" obsolete.) (35.6%)
3. Russian (10.0%)
4. Ukrainian (2.00%)
5. Other (0.90%)

Historical population
Year	Pop.	±%
2004	7,096	—
2014	5,961	−16.0%
2024	6,714	+12.6%

== Sports ==
The FMF Futsal Arena is located in Ciorescu. In 2016 it hosted the Basketball 2016 FIBA European Championship for Small Countries, which took place 28 June – 3 July.
