= Amandinha =

Brazilian futsal player (born 1994)

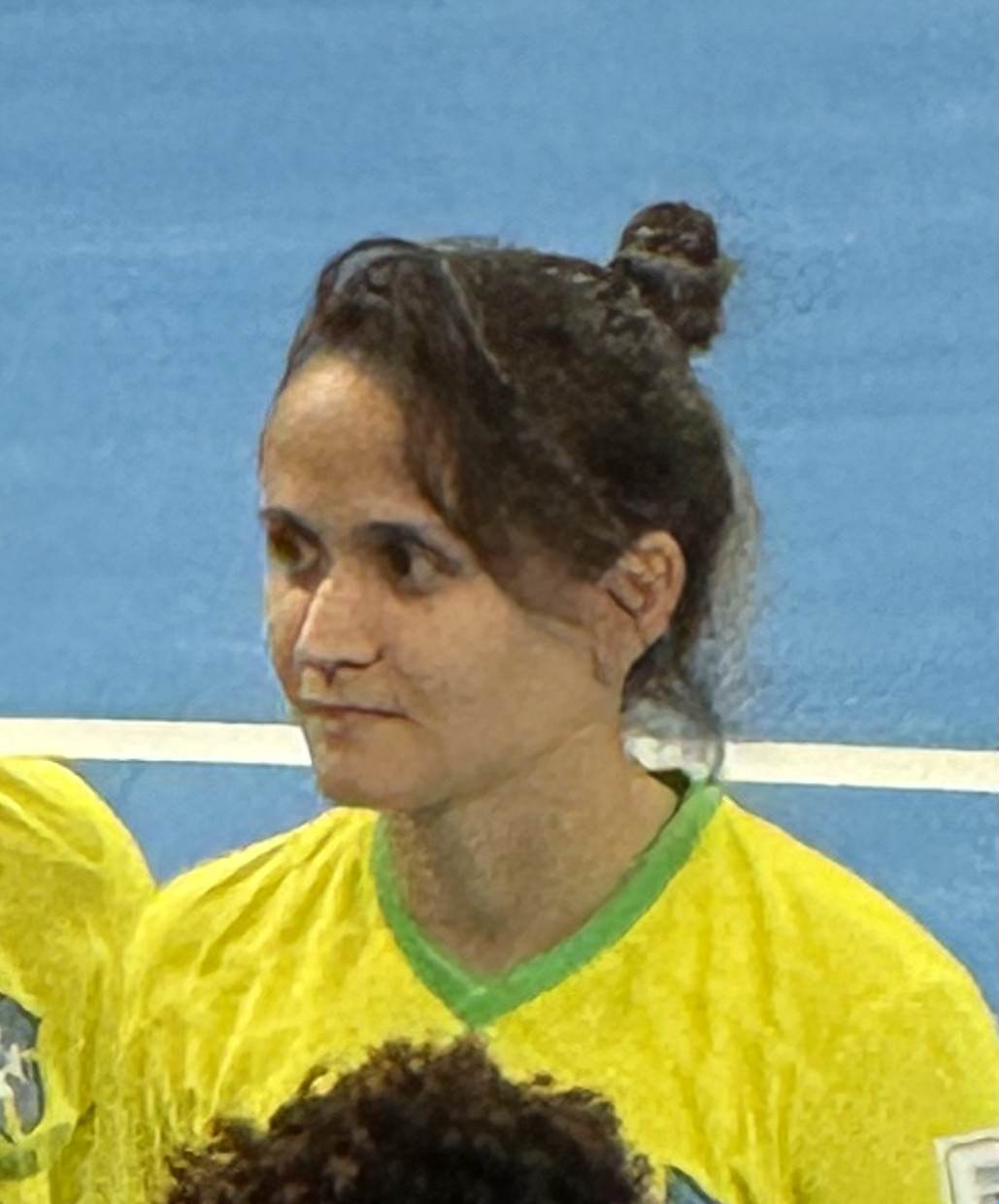
- Amandinha at the 2025 FIFA Futsal Women's World Cup

Personal information
- Full name: Amanda Lyssa de Oliveira Crisóstomo
- Date of birth: 5 September 1994 (age 32)
- Place of birth: Fortaleza, Brazil
- Height: 1.58 m (5 ft 2 in)
- Position: Left winger

Team information
- Current team: Torreblanca Melilla
- Number: 10

Senior career*
Years	Team	Apps	(Gls)
2011-2016	Barateiro Futsal		
2017–2021	Leoas da Serra		
2022–	Torreblanca Melilla		

International career^{‡}
2013–	Brazil		
Medal record
Women's football
Representing Brazil
FIFA Futsal Women's World Cup
Winner	2025 Philippines
World Tournament
Winner	2013 Spain
Winner	2014 Costa Rica
Winner	2015 Guatemala
Copa América
Winner	2017 Uruguay
Winner	2019 Paraguay
Winner	2023 Argentina
Winner	2025 Brazil
- * Club domestic league appearances and goals as of 10 May 2025 ‡ National team caps and goals as of 8 April 2025

Amanda Lyssa de Oliveira Crisóstomo (born 5 September 1994), commonly known as Amandinha, is a Brazilian professional futsal player who plays as a left winger for Torreblanca Melilla and the Brazil women's national team. She was awarded the best female futsal player in the world 8 consecutive times, the most by any player.

== Early life and career ==
Born in Fortaleza, Ceará, Amandinha has enjoyed sports since she was very young. She accompanied her father, Agnaldo Crisóstomo, and her uncle to local soccer matches and even practiced sports such as table tennis, soccer and volleyball.

Amandinha began playing futsal in the social project of professor André Lima in Conjunto Ceará, the neighborhood where she was born. Despite playing with boys, she quickly managed to stand out in the amateur tournaments she participated in and was called to compete in an intercollegiate championship. After a great performance in the competition, she received a scholarship to play and study at a private school in Fortaleza.

The Ceará native continued to stand out in school until, at the age of 15, when she was already playing for the Ceará women's futsal team, she caught the attention of Barateiro Futsal from Brusque, Santa Catarina. Determined to continue playing, she moved from her parents' house while still a teenager to live in the cities of Santa Catarina in 2011.

== Club career ==
Amandinha's time at Barateiro was full of titles. The Ceará native won tournaments such as the Taça Brasil (2013), the Campeonato Catarinense (2012, 2015 and 2016), the Liga Nacional de Futsal (2014) and the Copa Libertadores (2015 and 2016). In addition, she was elected the best player in the world for the first time in 2014, at just 19 years old.

After six years at Barateiro, Amandinha went to Leoas da Serra, from Lages, Santa Catarina, in 2017. There, she continued to pile up titles and won the Santa Catarina Open Games (2017), the Copa do Brasil (2017), the Copa Libertadores (2018), the Taça Brasil (2019), the Copa das Campeãs (2019) and the Interclub World Cup (2019).

In May 2020, Amandinha had to undergo surgery to remove an ovarian cyst, which had caused a hemorrhage. During the procedure, the existence of another cyst was discovered, which was also successfully removed.

At the end of 2021, Amandinha left Leoas da Serra and started playing for Torreblanca Melilla, from Spain, at the beginning of 2022, having her first experience outside of national futsal. In total, she played 161 matches, scored 157 goals and won 23 titles for Leoas.

== International career ==
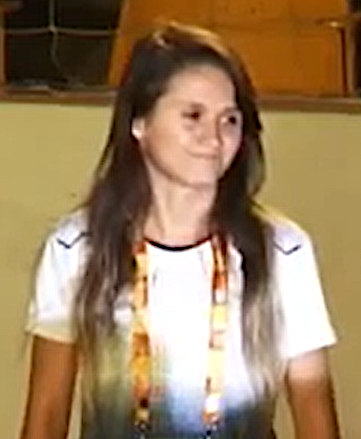
Amandinha at the opening ceremony of the World University Futsal Championship in 2016

Amandinha is considered one of the main reasons for the hegemony of the Brazil women's national team in the Women's Futsal World Tournament. Called up to the national team since 2013, she participated in the campaigns of the World Tournament that resulted in the world titles of 2013, 2014 and 2015. She was also champion of the Copa América in 2017, 2019, 2023 and 2025, as well as the 2019 Grand Prix for Brazil.

Amandinha played for Brazil at the inaugural 2025 FIFA Futsal Women's World Cup in the Philippines. Her team won this maiden edition, defeating Portugal in the final, where she scored the second goal.

== Accolades ==
Amandinha has become the biggest name in women's futsal worldwide, being elected the best player in the world in 2014, 2015, 2016, 2017, 2018, 2019, 2020 and 2021. Amandinha is the record holder in the category at the awards, which have been held since 2007 and have already awarded four other Brazilians: Vanessa (3), Lu Minuzzo (1), Cilene (1) and Emilly (1). The award in question is the Futsal Awards, granted by the website Futsal Planet and considered the main award in the category.

== Personal life ==
In addition to being a professional futsal player, Amandinha is also a physiotherapist. She completed her degree in physiotherapy at Uniplac (Universidade do Planalto Catarinense) in 2018.

== In popular culture ==
In 2019, Grupo Globo produced the documentary Carregando a Bola: A História da Melhor do Mundo no Futsal (Carrying the Ball: The Story of the World's Best Futsal Player), which was broadcast nationally on the SporTV channel.

== Honours ==
Barateiro

- Liga Nacional: 2014
- Taça Brasil: 2013
- Copa Libertadores: 2015, 2016
- Campeonato Catarinense: 2012, 2015, 2016

Leoas da Serra

- Copa do Brasil: 2017
- Taça Brasil: 2019
- Copa das Campeãs: 2019
- Intercontinental Cup: 2019
- Copa Libertadores: 2016, 2017, 2018
- Jogos Abertos de Santa Catarina: 2017

Torreblanca Melilla

- Copa de la Reina: 2024

Brazil

- FIFA Futsal Women's World Cup: 2025
- World Tournament: 2013, 2014, 2015
- Copa América: 2017, 2019, 2023, 2025

Individual

- Futsal Awards Best Female Player in the World: 2014, 2015, 2016, 2017, 2018, 2019, 2020, 2021 (record)
