= World University Futsal Championships =

Annual international Futsal competition (started 1984)

The World University Futsal Championships is the competitions in futsal for the university teams held from 1984.

== History ==
Sources:

== Men's results ==
Year	Host	Final			Third place match		
Year	Host	Winners	Score	Runners-Up	3rd place	Score	4th place
1984; Details	(Brazil); São Paulo	Brazil	5–4	Paraguay	Spain	7–6	Italy
1990; Details	(Italy); Parma	Italy	5–4 (pen)	Spain	Soviet Union	5–4	Belgium
1992; Details	(Spain); Málaga	Spain	8–1	Belgium	Italy	2–1	Brazil
1994; Details	(Cyprus); Nicosia	Russia	6–5	Spain	Italy	6–2	Belgium
1996; Details	(Finland); Jyväskylä	Brazil	6–5 (aet)	Russia	Ukraine	9–5	Portugal
1998; Details	(Portugal); Braga	Ukraine	3–2 (aet)	Russia	Brazil	5–1	Portugal
2000; Details	(Brazil); João Pessoa	Brazil	6–2	Italy	Russia	3–2	Portugal
2002; Details	(Hungary); Nyíregyháza	Russia	4–1	Italy	Ukraine	5–3	Hungary
2004; Details	(Spain); Palma De Mallorca	Ukraine	3–1	Brazil	Russia	3–2	Spain
2006; Details	(Poland); Poznań	Russia	4–1	Brazil	Ukraine	5–1	Poland
2008; Details	(Slovenia); Koper	Portugal	5–1	Ukraine	Serbia	8–1	Slovenia
2010; Details	(Serbia); Novi Sad	Brazil	3–2	Russia	Serbia	6–4 (pen)	Ukraine
2012; Details	(Portugal); Braga	Ukraine	1–0	Russia	Portugal	2–0	Thailand
2014; Details	(Spain); Antequera/Málaga	Russia	8–5	Brazil	Belarus	7–6 (pen)	Iran
2016; Details	(Brazil); Goiânia	Brazil	2–1	Russia	Czech Republic	11-3	France
2018; Details	(Kazakhstan); Almaty	Russia	4–2	Kazakhstan	Ukraine	3–0	Portugal
2022; Details	(Portugal); Guimarães	Brazil	6–4	Ukraine	Portugal	5–3	Czech Republic
2024; Details	(China); Shanghai	Croatia	4–1	Brazil	France	2–1	Ukraine
2026; Details	(Poland); Poznań	Brazil	8–5	Portugal	Poland	0–0 (5–4 pen)	Czech Republic

=== Medal table ===
Rank	Nation	Gold	Silver	Bronze	Total
1	Brazil	7	4	1	12
2	Russia	5	5	2	12
3	Ukraine	3	2	4	9
4	Italy	1	2	2	5
5	Spain	1	2	1	4
6	Portugal	1	1	2	4
7	Croatia	1	0	0	1
8	Belgium	0	1	0	1
8	Kazakhstan	0	1	0	1
8	Paraguay	0	1	0	1
11	Serbia	0	0	2	2
12	Belarus	0	0	1	1
12	Czech Republic	0	0	1	1
12	France	0	0	1	1
12	Poland	0	0	1	1
12	Soviet Union	0	0	1	1
Totals (16 entries)		19	19	19	57

== Women's results ==
Year	Host	Final			Third place match		
Year	Host	Winners	Score	Runners-Up	3rd place	Score	4th place
2008	(Brazil); Vitória	Brazil	11–4	Portugal	China	3–1	Costa Rica
2010	(Serbia); Novi Sad	Brazil	^{n/a}	Portugal	Russia	^{n/a}	France
2012	(Portugal); Braga	Brazil	^{n/a}	Spain	Portugal	^{n/a}	Russia
2014	(Spain); Antequera/Málaga	Brazil	3–1	Spain	Russia	1–0	Portugal
2016	(Brazil); Goiânia	Brazil	1–0	Russia	Portugal	6–0	Canada
2018	(Kazakhstan); Almaty	Russia	2–0	Ukraine	France	4–4	Portugal
2022	(Portugal); Guimarães	Portugal	5–5 5-4(pen)	Brazil	Poland	5–0	New Zealand
2024	(China); Shanghai	Brazil	3–1	Portugal	China	3–1	New Zealand
2026	(Poland); Poznań	Brazil	3–0	Portugal	Poland	2–0	Germany

^n/a A round-robin tournament determined the final standings.

=== Medal table ===
Rank	Nation	Gold	Silver	Bronze	Total
1	Brazil	7	1	0	8
2	Portugal	1	4	2	7
3	Russia	1	1	2	4
4	Spain	0	2	0	2
5	Ukraine	0	1	0	1
6	China	0	0	2	2
6	Poland	0	0	2	2
8	France	0	0	1	1
Totals (8 entries)		9	9	9	27
