= UEFA Women's Futsal Euro 2023 =

2023 UEFA Women's Futsal Euro

Tournament details
- Host country: Preliminary round: Group A: Serbia; Group B: Gibraltar; Group C: Lithuania; Main round: Group A: Finland; Group B: Poland; Group C: Portugal; Group D: Czech Republic; Final tournament: Hungary
- Dates: Preliminary round: 10–15 May 2022; Main round: 18–23 October 2022; Final tournament: 17–19 March 2023
- Teams: Final tournament: 4 Qualifying: 24 (from 1 confederation)
- Venue: Final tournament: 1 (in 1 host city)

Final positions
- Champions: Spain
- Runners-up: Ukraine
- Third place: Portugal
- Fourth place: Hungary

Tournament statistics
- Matches played: 18
- Goals scored: 123 (6.83 per match)
- Attendance: 1,860 (103 per match)
- Top scorer: (Belgium) Justine Gomboso (6 goals)
- All statistics correct as of 14 May 2022.

The 2023 UEFA Women's Futsal Championship, also referred to as UEFA Women's Futsal Euro 2023, is the third edition of the UEFA Women's Futsal Championship, the biennial international futsal championship organised by UEFA for the women's national teams of Europe.

== Teams ==
A total of 24 (out of 55) UEFA member national teams entered the qualifying stage, with Latvia making their debuts. Based on their coefficient ranking, the 12 highest-ranked teams entered the main round, while the 12 lowest-ranked teams entered the preliminary round. Three teams were pre-selected as hosts for the preliminary round and four teams were pre-selected as hosts for the main round.

The draws for the preliminary round and main round was held on 18 February 2022, 14:00 CEST (UTC+2), at the UEFA headquarters in Nyon, Switzerland.

The mechanism of the draws for each round was as follows:

- In the preliminary round, the 12 teams were drawn into three groups of four teams each. First, the three teams which were pre-selected as hosts were drawn from their own designated pot and allocated to their respective group as per their seeding positions. Next, the remaining eight teams were drawn from their respective pot which were allocated according to their seeding positions (the lowest-ranked teams were allocated first to seeding position 4, then seeding position 3).
- In the main round, the 16 teams were drawn into four groups of four, containing one team from each of the seeding positions 1–4. First, the three teams which were pre-selected as hosts were drawn from their own designated pot and allocated to their respective group as per their seeding positions. Next, the remaining 12 teams were drawn from their respective pot which were allocated according to their seeding positions (including the three preliminary round winners, whose identity was not known at the time of the draw, which were allocated to seeding position 4). Based on the decisions taken by the UEFA Emergency Panel, Spain and Gibraltar could not be drawn in the same group. Should Gibraltar qualify for the main round, and were drawn into the same group as Spain, they would be swapped with the relevant team from the next available group.

Participating teams for UEFA Women's Futsal Euro 2023

Teams entering main round
Team	Coeff.	Rank	Seed
Spain	TBD	1	1
Portugal **(H)**	TBD	2	1
~~Russia~~	TBD	3	1
Ukraine	TBD	4	1
Hungary	5.000	5	2
Finland **(H)**	4.667	6	2
Italy	4.667	7	2
Poland **(H)**	4.000	8	2
Croatia	4.000	9	3
Sweden	3.667	10	3
Czech Republic **(H)**	3.667	11	3
Belarus	2.417	12	3

Teams entering preliminary round
Team	Coeff.	Rank	Seed
Netherlands	2.333	13	1
Belgium	2.125	14	1
Slovenia	2.000	15	1
Slovakia	1.750	16	2
Serbia **(H)**	1.667	17	2
Kazakhstan	1.000	18	2
Gibraltar **(H)**	0.500	19	3
Northern Ireland	0.333	20	3
Bosnia and Herzegovina	0.333	21	3
Lithuania **(H)**	0.250	22	4
Moldova	0.250	23	4
Latvia	0.000	24	4

Notes

- Teams marked in **bold** have qualified for the final tournament.
- (H): Teams pre-selected as hosts for the preliminary round and the main round

== Format ==
In the preliminary round and main round, each group is played as a round-robin mini-tournament at the pre-selected hosts.

In the final tournament, the four qualified teams play in knockout format (semi-finals, third place match, and final), either at a host selected by UEFA from one of the teams, or at a neutral venue.

=== Tiebreakers ===
In the preliminary round and main round, teams are ranked according to points (3 points for a win, 1 point for a draw, 0 points for a loss), and if tied on points, the following tiebreaking criteria are applied, in the order given, to determine the rankings (Regulations Articles 14.01 and 14.02):

1. Points in head-to-head matches among tied teams;
2. Goal difference in head-to-head matches among tied teams;
3. Goals scored in head-to-head matches among tied teams;
4. If more than two teams are tied, and after applying all head-to-head criteria above, a subset of teams are still tied, all head-to-head criteria above are reapplied exclusively to this subset of teams;
5. Goal difference in all group matches;
6. Goals scored in all group matches;
7. Penalty shoot-out if only two teams have the same number of points, and they met in the last round of the group and are tied after applying all criteria above (not used if more than two teams have the same number of points, or if their rankings are not relevant for qualification for the next stage);
8. Disciplinary points (red card = 3 points, yellow card = 1 point, expulsion for two yellow cards in one match = 3 points);
9. UEFA coefficient ranking.

== Preliminary round ==
The winners of each group and the two best runners-up advance to the Main Round to join the 11 teams which receive byes.

Originally, Russia received a bye to the Main Round and only the best runners-up would advance to the Main Round. On 2 May 2022, UEFA replaced Russia with the second best-ranked runner-up of the preliminary round due to the Russian invasion of Ukraine.

Times are CEST (UTC+2), as listed by UEFA (local times, if different, are in parentheses).

=== Group A ===
Pos	Team	Pld	W	D	L	GF	GA	GD	Pts	Qualification
1	Netherlands	3	3	0	0	13	2	+11	9	Main round
2	Serbia (H)	3	2	0	1	12	6	+6	6	
3	Northern Ireland	3	1	0	2	5	5	0	3	
4	Latvia	3	0	0	3	1	18	−17	0	

Source: UEFA
Rules for classification: Tiebreakers
(H) Hosts
11 May 2022
16:00

Northern Ireland	1–2	Serbia
McKay 13:36	Report	Vukovic 14:09; Trišić 26:13

Sports Hall "Vlade Divac", Vrnjačka Banja
Attendance: 30
Referee: Mariia Glekova (Israel), Martin Køster (Denmark), Zyl Robert Fred Sheriff (Gibraltar)
11 May 2022
19:30

Netherlands	6–0	Latvia
Drost 2:22; De Groen 6:18, 14:18; Hand 13:23, 28:17, 28:25	Report

Sports Hall "Vlade Divac", Vrnjačka Banja
Attendance: 20
Referee: Dominykas Norkus (Lithuania), Zyl Robert Fred Sheriff (Gibraltar), Martin Køster (Denmark)

12 May 2022
16:00

Northern Ireland	0–2	Netherlands
	Report	Verschoor 15:02; De Groen 28:15

Sports Hall "Vlade Divac", Vrnjačka Banja
Attendance: 10
Referee: Martin Køster (Denmark), Dominykas Norkus (Lithuania), Mariia Glekova (Israel)
12 May 2022
19:30

Serbia	8–0	Latvia
Vukovic 0:55; Knežević 6:10; Janković 13:12; Marjanović 19:51; Marenić 23:19, 33:49; Garanča 26:17 (o.g.); Trbojević 32:20	Report

Sports Hall "Vlade Divac", Vrnjačka Banja
Attendance: 50
Referee: Zyl Robert Fred Sheriff (Gibraltar), Mariia Glekova (Israel), Dominykas Norkus (Lithuania)

14 May 2022
16:00

Latvia	1–4	Northern Ireland
Garanča 32:54	Report	Brown 1:59; McKay 11:50, 12:41; Rea 18:43

Sports Hall "Vlade Divac", Vrnjačka Banja
Attendance: 10
Referee: Zyl Robert Fred Sheriff (Gibraltar), Mariia Glekova (Israel), Dominykas Norkus (Lithuania)
14 May 2022
19:30

Serbia	2–5	Netherlands
Vukovic 16:47, 32:09	Report	De Groen 6:20, 9:44; Drost 24:27, 25:22; Kortlever 38:38

Sports Hall "Vlade Divac", Vrnjačka Banja
Attendance: 100
Referee: Martin Køster (Denmark), Dominykas Norkus (Lithuania), Mariia Glekova (Israel)

=== Group B ===
Pos	Team	Pld	W	D	L	GF	GA	GD	Pts	Qualification
1	Belgium	3	2	1	0	19	6	+13	7 (Note: Tied on Head-to-head points: 1; Head-to-head goal difference: 0; Head-to-head goals scored: 1; Goal difference: Belgium +13, Slovakia +4.)	Main round
2	Slovakia	3	2	1	0	9	5	+4	7	Main round
3	Gibraltar (H)	3	0	1	2	9	13	−4	1 (Note: Tied on Head-to-head points: 1; Head-to-head goal difference: 0; Head-to-head goals scored: 3; Goal difference: Gibraltar -4, Moldova -13.)	
4	Moldova	3	0	1	2	6	19	−13	1	

Source: UEFA
Rules for classification: Tiebreakers
(H) Hosts
Notes:
11 May 2022
14:00

Belgium	12–1	Moldova
Van Roie 1:07, 25:45, 37:21; Van Den Bergh 6:10, 34:07; Gomboso 7:24, 24:40, 38:23; Drumont 11:58; Wielockx 13:31, 32:51; Peeters 36:06	Report	Bîrca 35:20

Tercentenary Sports Hall, Gibraltar
Attendance: 20
Referee: Roosa-Maria Karoliina Tuomi (Finland), Daniel Deca (Romania), Slawomir Steczko (Poland)
11 May 2022
18:00

Slovakia	4–2	Gibraltar
Valová 3:50, 13:34; Tyčiaková 16:23; Rybanská 20:59	Report	Neale 20:25; Victor 37:24

Tercentenary Sports Hall, Gibraltar
Attendance: 600
Referee: Annamaria Tolnay (Hungary), Slawomir Steczko (Poland), Daniel Deca (Romania)

12 May 2022
14:00

Slovakia	1–1	Belgium
Hanková 2:08	Report	Drumont 32:26 (pen.)

Tercentenary Sports Hall, Gibraltar
Attendance: 15
Referee: Slawomir Steczko (Poland), Roosa-Maria Karoliina Tuomi (Finland), Annamaria Tolnay (Hungary)
12 May 2022
18:00

Gibraltar	3–3	Moldova
Victor 12:06; Gilbert 19:59; El-Din 23:40	Report	Ciobanu 12:51, 33:53; Holt 36:30

Tercentenary Sports Hall, Gibraltar
Attendance: 410
Referee: Daniel Deca (Romania), Annamaria Tolnay (Hungary), Roosa-Maria Karoliina Tuomi (Finland)

14 May 2022
14:00

Gibraltar	4–6	Belgium
Gilbert 0:24; El-Din 21:34; Mascarenhas-Olivero 31:39; Karp 33:49	Report	Gomboso 7:16, 16:29, 39:59; Garcia 10:24 (o.g.); Van Den Bergh 22:28; Drumont 34:21

Tercentenary Sports Hall, Gibraltar
Attendance: 348
Referee: Slawomir Steczko (Poland), Daniel Deca (Romania), Roosa-Maria Karoliina Tuomi (Finland)
14 May 2022
18:00

Moldova	2–4	Slovakia
Ciobanu 9:21; Catarău 39:26	Report	Kucharčíková 9:39, 37:13; Majtényiová 29:01; Hanková 39:35

Tercentenary Sports Hall, Gibraltar
Attendance: 7
Referee: Annamaria Tolnay (Hungary), Roosa-Maria Karoliina Tuomi (Finland), Daniel Deca (Romania)

=== Group C ===
Pos	Team	Pld	W	D	L	GF	GA	GD	Pts	Qualification
1	Slovenia	3	3	0	0	23	2	+21	9	Main round
2	Bosnia and Herzegovina	3	2	0	1	19	9	+10	6	Main round
3	Lithuania (H)	3	0	1	2	2	16	−14	1 (Note: Head-to-head points: Lithuania 1, Kazakhstan 1; Head-to-head goal difference: Lithuania 0, Kazakhstan 0; Head-to-head goals scored: Lithuania 0, Kazakhstan 0; Goal difference: Lithuania -14, Kazakhstan -17.)	
4	Kazakhstan	3	0	1	2	5	22	−17	1	

Source: UEFA
Rules for classification: Tiebreakers
(H) Hosts
Notes:
11 May 2022
15:00 (16:00 EEST)

Slovenia	3–1	Bosnia and Herzegovina
Novak 14:03; Marković 19:47 (o.g.); Kos 21:01	Report	Milović 34:49

Prienai Arena, Prienai
Attendance: 15
Referee: David Glavonjic (Sweden), Florentina Kallaba (Kosovo), Monika Czudzinowicz (Poland)
11 May 2022
17:30 (18:30 EEST)

Kazakhstan	0–0	Lithuania
	Report

Prienai Arena, Prienai
Attendance: 65
Referee: Darko Boskovic (Switzerland), Monika Czudzinowicz (Poland), Florentina Kallaba (Kosovo)

12 May 2022
15:00 (16:00 EEST)

Kazakhstan	1–11	Slovenia
Fedyakina 1:13	Report	Škvorc 0:31, 4:06, 34:41; Ložar 10:00, 16:34; Žvokelj 11:19; Tkach 13:45 (o.g.); Adamič 14:30; Novak 19:40; Kranjc 34:21; Kozina 38:37

Prienai Arena, Prienai
Attendance: 10
Referee: Monika Czudzinowicz (Poland), David Glavonjic (Sweden), Darko Boskovic (Switzerland)
12 May 2022
17:30 (18:30 EEST)

Lithuania	2–7	Bosnia and Herzegovina
Dockaitė 7:22 (pen.), 17:11 (pen.)	Report	Bagarić 2:53, 9:55 (pen.); Crnoja 3:56, 24:56, 32:53; Alibašić 13:18; Mujanović 38:51

Prienai Arena, Prienai
Attendance: 50
Referee: Florentina Kallaba (Kosovo), Darko Boskovic (Switzerland), David Glavonjic (Sweden)

14 May 2022
15:00 (16:00 EEST)

Bosnia and Herzegovina	11–4	Kazakhstan
Milović 2:16, 16:47; Trumić 9:26, 15:17, 30:33; Bagarić 15:47, 32:47, 39:13; Mujanović 32:09; Njeguš 37:52; Crnoja 39:59	Report	Vyldanova 0:31, 19:01, 22:20; Sadykova 5:08

Prienai Arena, Prienai
Attendance: 25
Referee: Darko Boskovic (Switzerland), Monika Czudzinowicz (Poland), David Glavonjic (Sweden)
14 May 2022
17:30 (18:30 EEST)

Lithuania	0–9	Slovenia
	Report	Ines 3:23; Ložar 9:18; Žvokelj 11:09; Šnofl 19:07; Kos 21:05, 21:23, 28:24; Kozina 25:40; Kranjc 35:57

Prienai Arena, Prienai
Attendance: 75
Referee: David Glavonjic (Sweden), Florentina Kallaba (Kosovo), Monika Czudzinowicz (Poland)

=== Ranking of second-placed teams ===
To determine the best runner-up, only the results of the runner-up teams against the first and third-placed teams in their group are taken into account.

Pos	Grp	Team	Pld	W	D	L	GF	GA	GD	Pts	Qualification
1	B	Slovakia	2	1	1	0	5	3	+2	4	Qualification to Main round
2	C	Bosnia and Herzegovina	2	1	0	1	8	5	+3	3	Qualification to Main round
3	A	Serbia	2	1	0	1	4	6	−2	3	

Source: UEFA
Rules for classification: 1) points; 2) goal difference; 3) goals scored; 4) disciplinary points; 5) coefficient ranking.

== Main round ==
The winners of each group advance to the final tournament.

Times are CEST (UTC+2), as listed by UEFA (local times, if different, are in parentheses).

=== Group 1 ===
Pos	Team	Pld	W	D	L	GF	GA	GD	Pts	Qualification
1	Spain	3	3	0	0	27	3	+24	9	Final tournament
2	Sweden	3	1	1	1	7	11	−4	4	
3	Finland (H)	3	1	0	2	13	10	+3	3	
4	Belgium	3	0	1	2	3	26	−23	1	

Source: UEFA
Rules for classification: Tiebreakers
(H) Hosts
19 October 2022
12:00 (13:00 EEST)

Spain	14–0	Belgium
Luján 5:14; Sotelo 5:36, 27:57, 37:05; Pino Cabrera 6:45, 22:37; Samper 12:20; Mateo 14:03; Montoro 14:56; Monedero 18:21, 19:50, 33:32; de Paz 29:12; Peque 37:51	Report

Energia Areena, Vantaa
Referee: Fatma Özlem Tursun (Turkey)
Viktor Bugenko (Moldova)
Stephen Vella (Malta)
19 October 2022
17:00 (18:00 EEST)

Sweden	3–2	Finland
Aguilar 1:23, 31:58; Glans 3:55	Report	Mäntylä 31:08; Viren 37:03

Energia Areena, Vantaa
Referee: Dominykas Norkus (Lithuania)
Stephen Vella (Malta)
Viktor Bugenko (Moldova)

20 October 2022
12:00 (13:00 EEST)

Sweden	1–6	Spain
Kiryo 20:31 (pen.)	Report	Sotelo 2:28; Gómez 3:23; Samper 12:09; Montoro 16:14; Peque 22:18; de Paz 24:57

Energia Areena, Vantaa
Referee: Viktor Bugenko (Moldova)
Dominykas Norkus (Lithuania)
Fatma Özlem Tursun (Turkey)
20 October 2022
17:00 (18:00 EEST)

Finland	9–0	Belgium
Herranen 2:55; Viren 5:17, 24:24, 39:44 (pen.); Mäntylä 6:30; Hannula 8:32; Lind 9:47, 10:31; Ylikraka 29:22	Report

Energia Areena, Vantaa
Referee: Stephen Vella (Malta)
Fatma Özlem Tursun (Turkey)
Dominykas Norkus (Lithuania)

22 October 2022
10:00 (11:00 EEST)

Belgium	3–3	Sweden
Bakar 19:31; Meyers 23:11; Drumont 30:23	Report	Glans 19:45; Aguilar 25:31; Kiryo 29:44 (pen.)

Energia Areena, Vantaa
Referee: Viktor Bugenko (Moldova)
Dominykas Norkus (Lithuania)
Fatma Özlem Tursun (Turkey)
22 October 2022
15:00 (16:00 EEST)

Finland	2–7	Spain
Lind 5:50, 12:34	Report	Sotelo 0:26, 2:35, 20:09; de Paz 2:48; Lauermaa 3:12 (o.g.); Domingos 13:51; Mateo 31:28

Energia Areena, Vantaa
Referee: Stephen Vella (Malta)
Fatma Özlem Tursun (Turkey)
Dominykas Norkus (Lithuania)

=== Group 2 ===
Pos	Team	Pld	W	D	L	GF	GA	GD	Pts	Qualification
1	Ukraine	3	2	1	0	11	4	+7	7	Final tournament
2	Netherlands	3	2	0	1	5	6	−1	6	
3	Poland (H)	3	1	1	1	4	3	+1	4	
4	Croatia	3	0	0	3	1	8	−7	0	

Source: UEFA
Rules for classification: Tiebreakers
(H) Hosts
19 October 2022
15:00

Croatia	0–2	Poland
	Report	Kubaszek 0:42; Moskała 30:35

Hala Sportowa UAM Morasko, Poznań
Referee: Cristiano José Cardoso Santos (Portugal)
Ugur Cakmak (Turkey)
Juan Boelen (Belgium)
19 October 2022
18:00

Ukraine	5–2	Netherlands
Tytova 6:24, 8:10; Forsiuk 24:43; Ruban 30:46; Kyslova 34:34	Report	Prijs 38:01, 38:11

Hala Sportowa UAM Morasko, Poznań
Referee: Norbert Szilágyi (Hungary)
Juan Boelen (Belgium)
Ugur Cakmak (Turkey)

20 October 2022
15:00

Croatia	1–5	Ukraine
Stipančević 15:14	Report	Ruban 16:04; Tytova 21:27 (pen.), 31:12; Dubytska 30:56; Forsiuk 34:06

Hala Sportowa UAM Morasko, Poznań
Referee: Juan Boelen (Belgium)
Cristiano José Cardoso Santos (Portugal)
Norbert Szilágyi (Hungary)
20 October 2022
18:00

Poland	1–2	Netherlands
Chóras 23:39	Report	Veltrop 25:03; Prijs 36:05

Hala Sportowa UAM Morasko, Poznań
Referee: Ugur Cakmak (Turkey)
Norbert Szilágyi (Hungary)
Cristiano José Cardoso Santos (Portugal)

22 October 2022
15:00

Netherlands	1–0	Croatia
Hand 11:36	Report

Hala Sportowa UAM Morasko, Poznań
Referee: Norbert Szilágyi (Hungary)
Ugur Cakmak (Turkey)
Juan Boelen (Belgium)
22 October 2022
18:00

Poland	1–1	Ukraine
Fronczak 4:18	Report	Tytova 15:00

Hala Sportowa UAM Morasko, Poznań
Referee: Cristiano José Cardoso Santos (Portugal)
Juan Boelen (Belgium)
Norbert Szilágyi (Hungary)

=== Group 3 ===
Pos	Team	Pld	W	D	L	GF	GA	GD	Pts	Qualification
1	Portugal (H)	3	3	0	0	31	1	+30	9	Final tournament
2	Italy	3	2	0	1	15	5	+10	6	
3	Belarus	3	0	1	2	3	23	−20	1	
4	Slovenia	3	0	1	2	3	23	−20	1	

Source: UEFA
Rules for classification: Tiebreakers
(H) Hosts
20 October 2022
16:00 (15:00 WEST)

Italy	8–0	Slovenia
Belli 0:23; Pomposelli 25:22, 33:38; Stumer Vanelli 27:16; Adamatti 27:42; Kranjc 34:22 (o.g.), 39:59 (o.g.); Ferrara 34:48	Report

Pavilhão Multiusos de Fafe, Fafe
Referee: David Schaerli (Switzerland)
Yiangos Yiangou (Cyprus)
Ibrahim El Jilali (Netherlands)
20 October 2022
20:00 (19:00 WEST)

Belarus	0–14	Portugal
	Report	Ana Azevedo 0:47, 35:18; Carla Vanessa 1:25, 12:44 (pen.), 22:19, 33:23; Tsikhavodava 5:38 (o.g.); Janice Silva 6:20, 17:12, 39:13; Shatsilenia 12:25 (o.g.); Fifó 19:41, 24:57, 27:21

Pavilhão Multiusos de Fafe, Fafe
Referee: Ozan Soykan (Turkey)
Ibrahim El Jilali (Netherlands)
Yiangos Yiangou (Cyprus)

21 October 2022
17:00 (16:00 WEST)

Belarus	0–6	Italy
	Report	Dal Maz 5:13, 16:18, 38:30; Belli 16:08, 31:00 (pen.); Grieco 37:55

Pavilhão Multiusos de Fafe, Fafe
Referee: Ibrahim El Jilali (Netherlands)
David Schaerli (Switzerland)
Ozan Soykan (Turkey)
21 October 2022
21:00 (20:00 WEST)

Portugal	12–0	Slovenia
Carla Vanessa 1:18, 11:31 (pen.), 33:33, 37:09; Jenny 10:15; Catia Morgado 10:23; Janice Silva 12:56, 26:35; Nunes 16:57; Pedreira 19:57; Ana Azevedo 32:44; Bucik 37:53 (o.g.)	Report

Pavilhão Multiusos de Fafe, Fafe
Referee: Yiangos Yiangou (Cyprus)
Ozan Soykan (Turkey)
David Schaerli (Switzerland)

23 October 2022
17:00 (16:00 WEST)

Slovenia	3–3	Belarus
Ines 14:08, 27:07; Ložar 14:31	Report	Vasilyeva 34:23, 38', 46'; Buzinova 38:03

Pavilhão Multiusos de Fafe, Fafe
Referee: Yiangos Yiangou (Cyprus)
Ibrahim El Jilali (Netherlands)
David Schaerli (Switzerland)
23 October 2022
21:00 (20:00 WEST)

Portugal	5–1	Italy
Fifó 14:45; Ana Azevedo 26:58; Pisko 35:30; Catia Morgado 37:31, 38:03	Report	Dal Maz 26:31

Pavilhão Multiusos de Fafe, Fafe
Referee: Ozan Soykan (Turkey)
David Schaerli (Switzerland)
Yiangos Yiangou (Cyprus)

=== Group 4 ===
Pos	Team	Pld	W	D	L	GF	GA	GD	Pts	Qualification
1	Hungary	3	2	1	0	7	3	+4	7	Final tournament
2	Bosnia and Herzegovina	3	2	0	1	6	5	+1	6	
3	Slovakia	3	0	2	1	5	6	−1	2	
4	Czech Republic (H)	3	0	1	2	6	10	−4	1	

Source: UEFA
Rules for classification: Tiebreakers
(H) Hosts
19 October 2022
15:00

Slovakia	1–1	Hungary
Rybanská 21:29	Report	Koch 31:13

Městská sportovní hala Vodova, Brno
Referee: Chiara Perona (Italy)
Moshe Bohbot (Israel)
Monika Czudzinowicz (Poland)
19 October 2022
18:00

Czech Republic	2–3	Bosnia and Herzegovina
Skálová 10:54; Špičková 34:19	Report	Glavota 2:50, 27:16; Vujadin 10:38

Městská sportovní hala Vodova, Brno
Referee: Dejan Veselic (Slovenia)
Monika Czudzinowicz (Poland)
Moshe Bohbot (Israel)

20 October 2022
15:00

Hungary	3–2	Bosnia and Herzegovina
Mujanović 13:59 (o.g.); Zukić 16:05 (o.g.); Folk 25:43	Report	Bagarić 9:10; Glavota 18:45

Městská sportovní hala Vodova, Brno
Referee: Monika Czudzinowicz (Poland)
Chiara Perona (Italy)
Dejan Veselic (Slovenia)
20 October 2022
18:00

Slovakia	4–4	Czech Republic
Kucharčíková 13:36; Hanková 27:36; Tyčiaková 31:46; Valová 32:08	Report	Šturmová 0:19; Skálová 8:16, 21:21; Špičková 16:21

Městská sportovní hala Vodova, Brno
Referee: Moshe Bohbot (Israel)
Dejan Veselic (Slovenia)
Chiara Perona (Italy)

22 October 2022
13:00

Bosnia and Herzegovina	1–0	Slovakia
Alibašić 13:15	Report

Městská sportovní hala Vodova, Brno
Referee: Chiara Perona (Italy)
Dejan Veselic (Slovenia)
Monika Czudzinowicz (Poland)
22 October 2022
16:00

Hungary	3–0	Czech Republic
Kota 0:20; Krascsenics 31:24, 37:24	Report

Městská sportovní hala Vodova, Brno
Referee: Moshe Bohbot (Israel)
Monika Czudzinowicz (Poland)
Dejan Veselic (Slovenia)

== Final tournament ==
The final tournament will be played 17 – 19 March 2023

=== Qualified teams ===
The following four teams qualify for the final tournament.

Team	Method of qualification	Date of qualification	Previous appearances in final tournament^{1}
Spain	Main round Group 1 winners	22 October 2022	2 (**2019**, **2022**)
Ukraine	Main round Group 2 winners	22 October 2022	2 (2019, 2022)
Portugal	Main round Group 3 winners	23 October 2022	2 (2019, 2022)
Hungary	Main round Group 4 winners	22 October 2022	1 (2022)

^{1} Bold indicates champions for that year. Italic indicates hosts for that year.

=== Squads ===
Each national team have to submit a squad of 14 players, two of whom must be goalkeepers.

=== Bracket ===
In the semi-finals and final, extra time and penalty shoot-out are used to decide the winner if necessary; however, no extra time is used in the third place match (Regulations Article 16.02 and 16.03).

Semi-finals
17 March – Főnix Arena, Debrecen
Hungary	1
**Ukraine**	**2**
17 March – Főnix Arena, Debrecen
**Spain**	**3**
Portugal	2

Final
19 March – Főnix Arena, Debrecen
Ukraine	1
**Spain**	**5**
Third place match
19 March – Főnix Arena, Debrecen
Hungary	0
**Portugal**	**12**

=== Semi-finals ===
17 March 2023
16:00

Spain	3–2	Portugal
Lucí Gómez 7:56; Noelia Montoro 13:31; Irene Córdoba 27:21	Report	Carla Vanessa 0:21, 26:57

Főnix Arena, Debrecen
Attendance: 1150
Referee: Dejan Veselič (Slovenia)
Mislav Džeko (Croatia)
Mariia Glekova (Israel)

17 March 2023
19:30

Ukraine	2–1	Hungary
Shulha 14:32, 31:13	Report	Horváth 11:04

Főnix Arena, Debrecen
Attendance: 2094
Referee: Daniele D'adamo (San Marino)
Talgat Kosmukhambetov (Kazakhstan)
Fatma Özlem Tursun (Turkey)

=== Third place match ===
19 March 2023
17:00

Hungary	0–12	Portugal
	Report	Kota 1:57 (o.g.); Carla Vanessa 9:56 (pen.), 19:03 (37:58); Sara Ferreira 13:21; Lídia Moreira 20:17; Carol Rocha 24:50, 26:44; Fifó 27:45, 29:29; Janice Silva 31:18; Pisko 35:22

Főnix Arena, Debrecen
Attendance: 1123
Referee: Fatma Özlem Tursun (Turkey)
Dominykas Norkus (Lithuania)
Daniele D'adamo (San Marino)

=== Final ===
19 March 2023
20:00

Ukraine	1–5	Spain
Shulha 35:34	Report	Peque 0:13 (pen.); Babenko 10:05 (o.g.); Ale de Paz 19:05; Irene Samper 20:26; Dany 36:46

Főnix Arena, Debrecen
Attendance: 687
Referee: Mislav Džeko (Croatia)
Dejan Veselič (Slovenia)
Monika Czudzinowicz (Poland)
