= 2013 Women's Futsal World Tournament =

Tournament details
- Host country: Spain
- Dates: 13–20 December 2013
- Teams: 9 (from 4 confederations)
- Venue(s): 2 (in 2 host cities)

Final positions
- Champions: Brazil (4th title)
- Runners-up: Spain
- Third place: Russia
- Fourth place: Portugal

Tournament statistics
- Matches played: 20
- Goals scored: 152 (7.6 per match)

The 2013 Women's Futsal World Tournament was the fourth edition of the Women's Futsal World Tournament, the premier world championship for women's national futsal teams. The competition was to be hosted in San Cristóbal, Táchira, Venezuela, but due to logistic problems, the competition was moved to Ciudad Real and Alcázar de San Juan, in Spain.

== Venues ==
Arena	Quijote Arena	Pabellón Antonio Díaz Miguel
Picture		
City	Ciudad Real	Alcázar de San Juan
Capacity	5,863	2,000
Matches	Group B (10), Play-off round (2)	Group A (6), Play-off round (2)

== Group stage ==
=== Group A ===
	Team	Pld	W	D	L	GF	GA	GD	Pts
1	Spain	3	3	0	0	12	6	+6	9
2	Portugal	3	2	0	1	13	5	+8	6
3	Japan	3	1	0	2	2	9	–7	3
4	Costa Rica	3	0	0	3	4	11	–7	0

14 Dec 2013 18:30	Portugal	4–0 (2–0)	Costa Rica
14 Dec 2013 20:30	Spain	2–0 (1–0)	Japan
15 Dec 2013 17:00	Portugal	6–0 (4–0)	Japan
15 Dec 2013 19:30	Spain	5–3 (4–1)	Costa Rica
16 Dec 2013 17:00	Japan	2–1 (0–0)	Costa Rica
16 Dec 2013 19:30	Portugal	3–5 (0–2)	Spain

=== Group B ===
	Team	Pld	W	D	L	GF	GA	GD	Pts
1	Brazil	4	3	1	0	43	4	+39	10
2	Russia	4	3	1	0	21	6	+15	10
3	Iran	4	2	0	2	17	13	+4	6
4	Ukraine	4	1	0	3	22	17	+5	3
5	Malaysia B	4	0	0	4	1	67	–66	0

14 Dec 2013 10:00	Iran	11–0 (7–0)	Malaysia B
14 Dec 2013 12:00	Ukraine	0–6 (0–4)	Brazil
14 Dec 2013 18:30	Ukraine	18–1 (8–1)	Malaysia B
14 Dec 2013 20:30	Iran	1–4 (0–2)	Russia
15 Dec 2013 17:00	Brazil	27–0 (17–0)	Malaysia B
15 Dec 2013 19:30	Russia	6–2 (3–0)	Ukraine
16 Dec 2013 17:00	Iran	1–7 (1–1)	Brazil
16 Dec 2013 19:30	Russia	11–0 (6–0)	Malaysia B
17 Dec 2013 17:00	Russia	3–3 (0–1)	Brazil
17 Dec 2013 19:30	Iran	4–2 (3–0)	Ukraine

== Play-off round ==
Semifinals
18-Dec
Spain	4
Russia	1
18-Dec
Brazil	5
Portugal	1

Final
20-Dec
Spain	1
Brazil	2
Third place
20-Dec
Russia(ps)	0 (3)
Portugal	0 (1)

Semifinals
18 Dec 2013 17:00	Brazil	5–1 (2–0)	Portugal
18 Dec 2013 20:00	Spain	4–1 (0–1)	Russia
3rd place
20 Dec 2013 17:00	Russia	0–0 (ps 3–1)	Portugal
Final
20 Dec 2013 12:00	Spain	1–2 (0–1)	Brazil

== Final ranking ==
Rank	Team
1st place, gold medalist(s)	Brazil
2nd place, silver medalist(s)	Spain
3rd place, bronze medalist(s)	Russia
4	Portugal
5	Iran
6	Ukraine
7	Japan
8	Costa Rica
9	Malaysia B

Women's Futsal World Tournament
2013 winners

Brazil
4th title

- Note - Malaysia sent their B team as the A team was taking part in the Southeast Asian Games in Myanmar at the same time.
