= 2011 Women's Futsal World Tournament =

Tournament details
- Host country: Brazil
- Dates: 5 December – 10 December
- Teams: 8 (from 4 confederations)
- Venue: 1 (in 1 host city)

Final positions
- Champions: Brazil (2nd title)
- Runners-up: Spain
- Third place: Portugal
- Fourth place: Russia

Tournament statistics
- Matches played: 20
- Goals scored: 126 (6.3 per match)

The 2011 Women's Futsal World Tournament was held in Fortaleza, Brazil from December 5 to December 10, 2011. It was the second World Tournament held under FIFA futsal rules. The venue was Ginásio Paulo Sarasate in Fortaleza.

== Venues ==
Arena	Ginásio Paulo Sarasate
Picture	
City	Fortaleza
Capacity	17,000
Matches	Group stage (12), Play-off round (8)

== Referees ==
- Marcelino Blazquez Sierra (Spain)
- Mario Fernando Lobo Silva (Portugal)
- Zelentsv Grigory (Russia)
- Shibamura Yoichi (Japan)
- Leonardo Taricani (Venezuela)
- Marcelo Bais (Argentina)
- Giselle Torri (Brazil)
- Katiucia Meneguzzi dos Santos (Brazil)
- Renata Neves Leite (Brazil)
- Alane Jussara da Silva Lucena (Brazil)

== Officials ==
- Sumula On Line Operator: Madeline Chaves Cavalcante (Brazil)
- FIFA Refereeing Technical Director: Jesus Rubio Cano (Spain)
- CBFS Refereeing Director: Paraguassu Fisch de Figueiredo (Brazil)

== Group stage ==
=== Group A ===
Pl	Team	Pld	W	D	L	GF	GA	Pts
1	Brazil	3	3	0	0	28	1	9
2	Spain	3	2	0	1	17	6	6
3	Venezuela	3	1	0	2	7	23	3
4	Angola	3	0	0	3	1	23	0

5 Dec 2011 14:00	Angola	1–7 (1–1)	Spain
5 Dec 2011 20:00	Brazil	14–0 (8–0)	Venezuela
6 Dec 2011 16:00	Venezuela	4–0 (3–0)	Angola
6 Dec 2011 20:00	Brazil	2–1 (2–1)	Spain
7 Dec 2011 16:00	Spain	9–3 (3–1)	Venezuela
7 Dec 2011 20:00	Brazil	12–0 (7–0)	Angola

=== Group B ===
Pl	Team	Pld	W	D	L	GF	GA	Pts
1	Portugal	3	3	0	0	13	2	9
2	Russia	3	2	0	1	5	6	6
3	Argentina	3	0	1	2	5	10	1
4	Japan	3	0	1	2	1	6	1

5 Dec 2011 16:00	Portugal	4–0 (3–0)	Japan
5 Dec 2011 18:00	Russia	4–2 (4–0)	Argentina
6 Dec 2011 14:00	Japan	0–1 (0–1)	Russia
6 Dec 2011 18:00	Argentina	2–5 (1–3)	Portugal
7 Dec 2011 14:00	Portugal	4–0 (2–0)	Russia
7 Dec 2011 18:00	Japan	1–1 (0–1)	Argentina

== Play-off round ==
=== 5th/8th places ===
Semifinals 5/8
8 December 2011 – Fortaleza
Venezuela	2
Japan	5
8 December 2011 – Fortaleza
Argentina	5
Angola	1

Fifth place
9 December 2011 – Fortaleza
Japan	3
Argentina	2
Seventh place
9 December 2011 – Fortaleza
Venezuela	6
Angola	2

Semifinals 5/8
8 Dec 2011 14:00	Venezuela	2–5 (0–2)	Japan
8 Dec 2011 16:00	Argentina	5–1 (4–0)	Angola
7th place
9 Dec 2011 13:00	Venezuela	6–2 (3–1)	Angola
5th place
9 Dec 2011 15:00	Japan	3–2 (1–0)	Argentina

=== 1st/4th places ===
Semifinals 1/4
9 December 2011 – Fortaleza
Portugal	3
Spain	4
9 December 2011 – Fortaleza
Brazil	5
Russia	1

Final
10 December 2011 – Fortaleza
Spain	3
Brazil	4
Third place
10 December 2011 – Fortaleza
Portugal	3
Russia	0

Semifinals 1/4
9 Dec 2011 17:00	Portugal	3–4 (3–1)	Spain
9 Dec 2011 19:00	Brazil	5–1 (2–0)	Russia
3rd place
10 Dec 2011 09:30	Portugal	3–0 (3–0)	Russia
Final
10 Dec 2011 11:30	Spain	3–4 (AET) (2–0, 3–3)	Brazil

== Final ranking ==
Rank	Team
Gold medal	Brazil
Silver medal	Spain
Bronze medal	Portugal
4	Russia
5	Japan
6	Argentina
7	Venezuela
8	Angola

Women's Futsal World Tournament
2011 winners

Brazil
2nd title
