= Spain women's national futsal team =

Spain
- Nickname(s): La Roja (The Red One)
- Association: Real Federación; Española de Fútbol
- Confederation: UEFA (Europe)
- FIFA code: ESP
- FIFA ranking: 2 (24 September 2026)
Home colours	Away colours

First international
- Spain 7–1 Ukraine (Elche, Spain; 21 November 1997)

Biggest win
- Russia 1–16 Spain (Rio Maior, Portugal; 23 April 2004)

Biggest defeat
- Brazil 4–0 Spain (Guatemala City, Guatemala; 28 November 2015); Portugal 5–1 Spain (Vila Real, Portugal; 15 January, 2020)

FIFA Futsal Women's World Cup
- Appearances: 1 (First in 2025)
- Best result: Third place (2025)

Euro
- Appearances: 2 (First in 2019)
- Best result: Champion (2019, 2022, 2023)

The Spain women's national futsal team represents Spain in international futsal competitions and is controlled by the Royal Spanish Football Federation. One of the strongest teams in the world, in 2025 they ranked 2nd in the FIFA World Rankings and won all of the first three UEFA Women's Futsal Championships in 2019, 2022, and 2023.

== Tournament records ==
=== FIFA Futsal Women's World Cup ===
FIFA Futsal Women's World Cup record									Qualification record					
Year	Round	Position	Pld	W	D*	L	GF	GA	Pld	W	D*	L	GF	GA
(Philippines) 2025	Third place	3rd	6	5	0	1	29	9	3	3	0	0	13	2
Total:1/1	1 Bronze	3rd	6	5	0	1	29	9	3	3	0	0	13	2
* Draws include knockout matches decided on penalty kicks.

=== World Tournament ===
World Tournament Record
Year	Round	Pld	W	D	L	GS	GA
(Spain) 2010	Semi-finals	4	3	0	1	20	6
(Brazil) 2011	Runners-up	4	3	0	1	24	12
(Portugal) 2012	Third place	6	5	1	0	21	10
(Spain) 2013	Runners-up	5	4	0	1	17	9
(Costa Rica) 2014	Third place	4	3	0	1	22	5
(Guatemala) 2015	Third place	5	3	0	2	25	10
Total	6/6	28	21	1	6	125	52

=== European Championship ===
UEFA Women's Futsal Championship Record
Year	Round	Pld	W	D	L	GS	GA
(Portugal) 2019	Champions	2	2	0	0	9	0
(Portugal) 2022	Champions	2	1	1	0	12	3
(Hungary) 2023	Champions	2	2	0	0	8	3
(Croatia) 2027	Qualified						
Total	3 titles	6	5	1	0	29	6

== Current squad ==
Squad for Euro 2019

No.	Pos.	Player	Date of birth (age)	Caps	Club
1	GK	Silvia Aguete	11 January 1987 (age 39)		(Spain) Poio FS
2	DF	Noelia Montero	1 November 1997 (age 28)		(Spain) UCAM Murcia
3	MF	Lucía Gómez	20 January 1992 (age 34)		(Spain) CD Burela FS
4	MF	Berta Velasco	13 December 1987 (age 38)		(Spain) AE Penya Esplugues
5	DF	Mayte Mateo	17 February 1994 (age 32)		(Spain) Roldán FSF
6	DF	Isabel García	29 January 1988 (age 38)		(Spain) AD Alcorcón FSF
7	MF	Amparo Jiménez	12 March 1986 (age 40)		(Italy) ASD Citta di Montesilvano
8	FW	Patricia "Peque" González	3 April 1987 (age 39)		(Spain) CD Burela FS
9	FW	Vanessa Sotelo	21 August 1995 (age 31)		(Spain) AD Alcorcón FSF
10	FW	Amelia Romero	25 September 1990 (age 36)		(Spain) Atlético Navalcarnero
11	MF	Irene Samper	20 April 1998 (age 28)		(Spain) AD Alcorcón FSF
12	GK	Marta Balbuena	28 April 1995 (age 31)		(Spain) Atlético Navalcarnero
13	GK	Caridad García	9 July 1999 (age 27)		(Spain) Guadalcacín FS
14	MF	Ana Luján (c)	20 September 1991 (age 35)		(Spain) Atlético Navalcarnero
15	MF	Consuelo Campoy	8 April 1994 (age 32)		(Spain) Roldán FSF

== See also ==
- Futsal in Spain
- Spain women's national football team
