= Women's Futsal World Tournament =

- Founded: 2010
- Abolished: 2015
- Region: International
- Teams: 8 (2015)
- Last champions: Brazil (6th title)
- Most championships: Brazil (6 titles)

The Women's Futsal World Tournament was an international women's futsal competition for national teams, organized by national associations. The first edition took place in 2010 in Spain and was won by Brazil. All six editions were won by Brazil.

The tournament was endorsed by national associations such as the Japan Football Association, Iranian Football Federation and FEDEFUT. FIFA announced the FIFA Futsal Women's World Cup in 2022, with the first edition taking place in 2025.

== Results ==
#	Year	Host	Final			Third Place			Teams
#	Year	Host	Winner	Score	Runner-up	Third Place	Score	Fourth Place	Teams
1	2010; Details	Spain	Brazil	5 – 1	Portugal	Russia and Spain			8
2	2011; Details	Brazil	Brazil	4 – 3 (a.e.t.)	Spain	Portugal	3 – 0	Russia	8
3	2012; Details	Portugal	Brazil	3 – 0	Portugal	Spain	1 – 0	Russia	10
4	2013; Details	Spain	Brazil	2 – 1	Spain	Russia	0 – 0 (a.e.t.); 3–1 (ps)	Portugal	9
5	2014; Details	Costa Rica	Brazil	4 – 3	Portugal	Spain	8 – 2	Costa Rica	7
6	2015; Details	Guatemala	Brazil	3 – 0	Russia	Spain	9 – 1	Portugal	8

== Debut of national teams ==
Year	Debuting teams		
Year	Teams	No.	Cum.
2010	Brazil, Guatemala, Japan, Portugal, Russia, Spain, Thailand, Venezuela	8	8
2011	Angola, Argentina	2	10
2012	Costa Rica, Iran, Malaysia, Ukraine	4	14
2013 – 2015	None	0	14

== Overall team records ==
In this ranking 3 points are awarded for a win, 1 for a draw and 0 for a loss. As per statistical convention in football, matches decided in extra time are counted as wins and losses, while matches decided by penalty shoot-outs are counted as draws. Teams are ranked by total points, then by goal difference, then by goals scored.

Rank	Team	Part	M	W	D	L	GF	GA	GD	Points
1	Brazil	6	32	29	3	0	204	22	+182	90
2	Spain	6	28	21	1	6	125	52	+73	64
3	Portugal	6	31	17	4	10	95	65	+30	55
4	Russia	6	29	13	3	13	65	52	+13	42
5	Japan	6	19	5	1	13	20	59	-39	16
6	Iran	3	13	5	0	8	30	40	-10	15
7	Ukraine	2	9	4	0	5	45	22	+23	12
8	Costa Rica	4	16	4	0	12	21	64	-43	12
9	Guatemala	3	10	2	1	7	7	36	-29	7
10	Venezuela	3	12	2	1	9	25	82	-57	7
11	Argentina	1	5	1	1	3	12	14	-2	4
12	Thailand	1	3	0	1	2	4	23	-19	1
13	Angola	1	5	0	0	5	4	34	-30	0
14	Malaysia	2	9	0	0	9	4	123	-119	0

== Medal table ==
Rank	Nation	Gold	Silver	Bronze	Total
1	Brazil	6	0	0	6
2	Portugal	0	3	1	4
3	Spain	0	2	4	6
4	Russia	0	1	2	3
Totals (4 entries)		6	6	7	19

== Comprehensive team results by tournament ==
Legend

- 1 — Champions
- 2 — Runners-up
- 3 — Third place
- 4 — Fourth place
- SF — Semifinals
- 5-10 — Fifth to Tenth place
- Q — Qualified for upcoming tournament
- — Hosts

Team	(Spain) 2010	(Brazil) 2011	(Portugal) 2012	(Spain) 2013	(Costa Rica) 2014	(Guatemala) 2015	Years
Angola		8					1
Argentina		6					1
Brazil	1	1	1	1	1	1	6
Costa Rica			8	8	4	5	4
Guatemala	8				5	6	3
Iran			7	5		7	3
Japan	5	5	6	7	6	8	6
Malaysia			10	9			2
Portugal	2	3	2	4	2	4	6
Russia	SF	4	4	3	7	2	6
Spain	SF	2	3	2	3	3	6
Thailand	7						1
Ukraine			5	6			2
Venezuela	6	7	9				3
Total	8	8	10	9	7	8	
