= 2010 Women's Futsal World Tournament =

Tournament details
- Host country: Spain
- Dates: 6 December – 11 December
- Teams: 8 (from 4 confederations)
- Venue(s): 2 (in 2 host cities)

Final positions
- Champions: Brazil (1st title)
- Runners-up: Portugal
- Third place: Russia and Spain

Tournament statistics
- Matches played: 15
- Goals scored: 91 (6.07 per match)

The 2010 Women's Futsal World Tournament was held in Spain from December 6 to December 11, 2010. It was the first World Tournament held under FIFA futsal rules. The venues were Pabellon José Caballero in Alcobendas and Pabellon Jorge Garbajosa in Torrejon de Ardoz.

== Venues ==
Arena	Pabellon José Caballero	Pabellon Jorge Garbajosa
Picture		
City	Alcobendas	Torrejon de Ardoz
Capacity	4,000	4,000
Matches	Group A (6), semifinal (1), final (1)	Group B (6), semifinal (1)

== Referees ==
- Lilla Perepatics (Hungary)
- Francesca Muccardo (Italy)
- Danjel Janosevic (Croatia)
- Eduardo Fernándes (Portugal)
- Francisco Peña (Spain)
- Roberto Gracia (Spain)
- Francisco Gutiérrez (Spain)
- Marcelino Blázquez (Spain)

== Group stage ==
=== Group A ===
Pl	Team	Pld	W	D	L	GF	GA	Pts
1	Brazil	3	2	1	0	30	2	7
2	Portugal	3	2	1	0	9	3	7
3	Venezuela	3	0	1	2	5	20	1
4	Thailand	3	0	1	2	4	23	1

6 Dec 2010 17:00	Thailand	0–5 (0–4)	Portugal
6 Dec 2010 19:30	Brazil	14–0 (6–0)	Venezuela
7 Dec 2010 17:00	Thailand	4–4 (1–4)	Venezuela
7 Dec 2010 19:30	Portugal	2–2 (1–1)	Brazil
8 Dec 2010 17:00	Venezuela	1–2 (1–1)	Portugal
8 Dec 2010 19:30	Brazil	14–0 (6–0)	Thailand

=== Group B ===
Pl	Team	Pld	W	D	L	GF	GA	Pts
1	Spain	3	3	0	0	17	2	9
2	Russia	3	2	0	1	4	4	6
3	Japan	3	1	0	2	4	9	3
4	Guatemala	3	0	0	3	1	11	0

6 Dec 2010 17:00	Japan	2–1 (0–1)	Guatemala
6 Dec 2010 19:30	Spain	3–1 (2–0)	Russia
7 Dec 2010 17:00	Japan	1–2 (0–1)	Russia
7 Dec 2010 19:30	Guatemala	0–8 (0–4)	Spain
8 Dec 2010 17:00	Russia	1–0 (0–0)	Guatemala
8 Dec 2010 19:30	Spain	6–1 (5–0)	Japan

== Play-off round ==
Semifinals
10 December 2010 – Torrejon
Brazil	4
Russia	0
10 December 2010 – Alcobendas
Spain	3
Portugal	4

Final
11 December 2010 – Alcobendas
Brazil	5
Portugal	1

Semifinals
10 Dec 2010 17:30	Brazil	4–0 (1–0)	Russia
10 Dec 2010 20:00	Spain	3–4 (1–2)	Portugal
Final
11 Dec 2010 16:30	Brazil	5–1 (2–0)	Portugal

== Final ranking ==
Rank	Team
Gold medal	Brazil
Silver medal	Portugal
Bronze medal	Russia
Bronze medal	Spain
5	Japan
6	Venezuela
7	Thailand
8	Guatemala

Women's Futsal World Tournament
2010 winners

Brazil
1st title
