= UEFA Women's Futsal Championship =

- Organiser(s): UEFA
- Founded: 2018
- Region: Europe
- Teams: Maximum of 55 (Qualifiers); 8 (Finals)
- Current champions: Spain (3rd title)
- Most championships: Spain (3 titles)
- Website: uefa.com/womensfutsaleuro
- UEFA Women's Futsal Euro 2027

The UEFA European Women's Futsal Championship, also referred to as UEFA Women's Futsal Euro, is the main women's national futsal competition organized by UEFA.

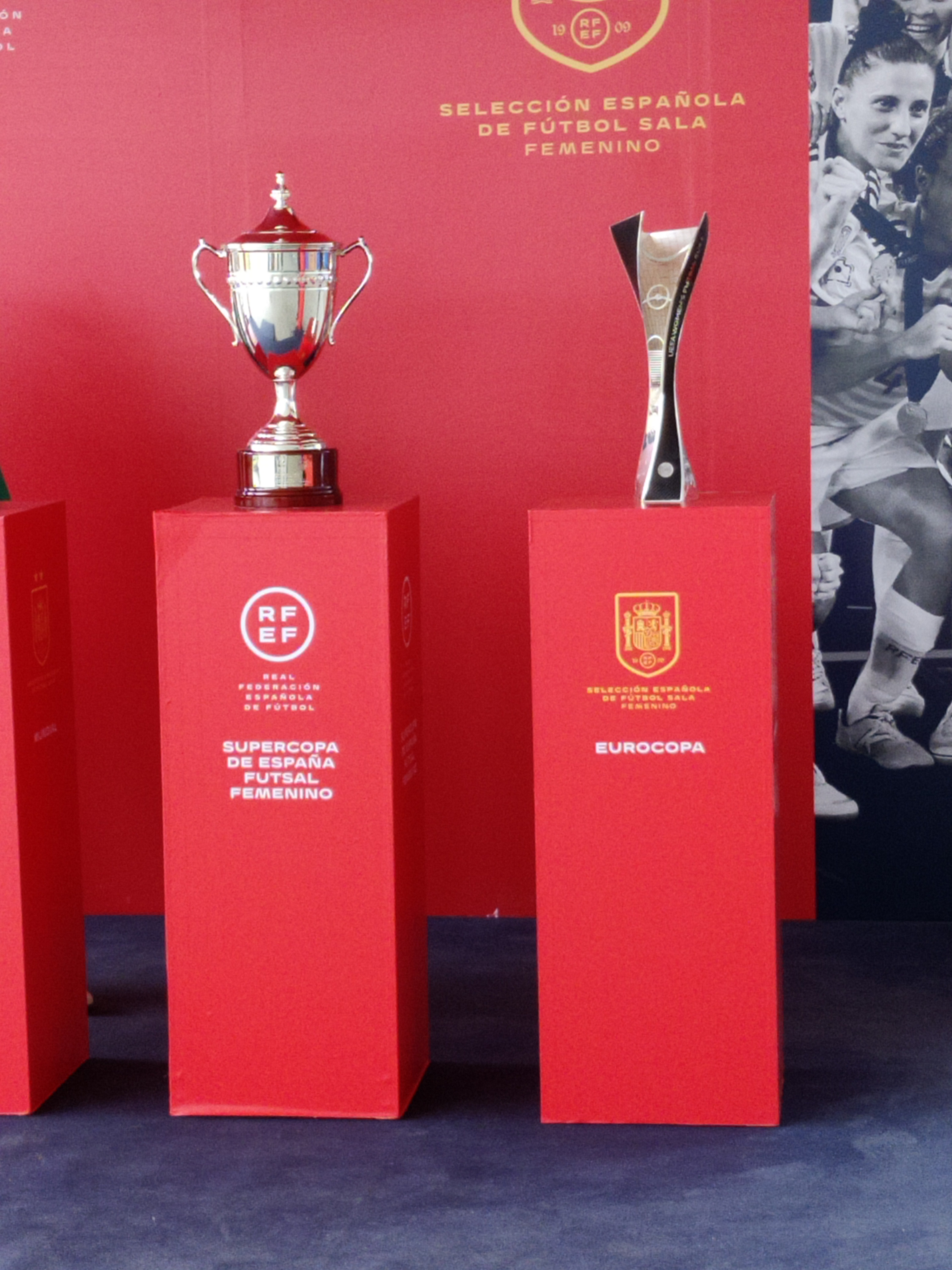
Trophy

The tournament was held every two years, with the first final tournament taking place in February 2019 and featuring four teams. The second edition, originally to be held in 2021, was postponed to 2022 due to the COVID-19 pandemic.

From 2023 onwards, the tournament switched to a four-year cycle to accommodate the newly established FIFA Futsal Women's World Cup.

Spain is the most successful team after winning the first three editions.

== Results by edition ==
Year	Host	Final			Third place match			Number of teams
Year	Host	Winner	Score	Runner-up	Third place	Score	Fourth place	Number of teams
2019; Details	Portugal	Spain	4–0	Portugal	Russia	2–2; 3–2 (p)	Ukraine	4
2022; Details	Portugal	Spain	3–3 (a.e.t.); 4–1 (p)	Portugal	Ukraine	2–1	Hungary	4
2023; Details	Hungary	Spain	5–1	Ukraine	Portugal	12–0	Hungary	4
2027; Details	Croatia							8

== Performance by nations ==
Team	Winners	Runners-up	Third-place	Fourth-place	Total
Spain	3 (2019, 2022, 2023)	–	–	–	3
Portugal	–	2 (2019, 2022)	1 (2023)	–	3
Ukraine	–	1 (2023)	1 (2022)	1 (2019)	3
Russia	–	–	1 (2019)	–	1
Hungary	–	–	–	2 (2022, 2023)	2

== Participation details ==
Team	2019 (Portugal) (4)	2022 (Portugal) (4)	2023 (Hungary) (4)	2027 (Croatia) (8)	Years
Croatia	–	–	–	Q	1
Hungary	–	4th	4th	Q	3
Italy	–	–	–	Q	1
Poland	–	–	–	Q	1
Portugal	2nd	2nd	3rd	Q	4
Russia	3rd	Suspended			1
Spain	1st	1st	1st	Q	4
Sweden	–	–	–	Q	1
Ukraine	4th	3rd	2nd	–	3

1. Russia originally qualified for the 2022 tournament as a group winner, but on 2 May 2022 UEFA banned all Russian clubs and teams from European competitions due to the invasion of Ukraine. Russia was replaced by Hungary, who finished second in Group 1 of the Main Round, won by Russia.

== Debut of teams ==
Year	Debuting teams		
Year	Teams	No.	CT
2019	Portugal, Russia, Spain, Ukraine	4	4
2022	Hungary	1	5
2023	none	0	5
2027	Croatia, (N/A) , Italy, Poland, Sweden	5	10

== See also ==
- UEFS Futsal Women's Championship
- UEFA Futsal Championship
