= 2012 Women's Futsal World Tournament =

Tournament details
- Host country: Portugal
- Dates: 3 December – 9 December
- Teams: 10 (from 4 confederations)
- Venue: 2 (in 1 host city)

Final positions
- Champions: Brazil (3rd title)
- Runners-up: Portugal
- Third place: Spain
- Fourth place: Russia

Tournament statistics
- Matches played: 27
- Goals scored: 161 (5.96 per match)

The 2012 Women's Futsal World Tournament was the third edition of the Women's Futsal World Tournament, the premier world championship for women's national futsal teams. It was held in Oliveira de Azeméis, Portugal, from 3 to 9 December 2012, and matches were played at the Pavilhão Dr. Salvador Machado and Pavilhão Municipal de Oliveira de Azeméis.

Brazil won its third consecutive world title after defeating the Portuguese hosts in the final by a 3–0 score. As in the two previous editions, Brazil, Portugal, Russia and Spain reached the semifinals.

== Venues ==
Arena	Pavilhão Dr. Salvador Machado	Pavilhão Municipal de Oliveira de Azeméis
Picture		
City	Oliveira de Azeméis	Oliveira de Azeméis
Capacity	5,000	450
Matches	Group A (9), Group B (9), Play-off round (7)	Group A (1), Group B (1)

== Referees ==
- Francisco Pena Diaz (Spain)
- Jeisson Peñaloza Cruz (Costa Rica)
- Katucia dos Santos (Brazil)
- Manuel Benitez (Venezuela)
- Mário Silva (Portugal)
- Maryam Pourjafarian (Iran)
- Nuno Bogalho (Portugal)
- Oleg Ivanov (Ukraine)
- Raquel Ruano (Spain)
- Sam Sudin Bin Ibrahim (Malaysia)
- Sérgio Magalhães (Portugal)
- Irina Velikanova (Russia)
- Yasukazu Nobumoto (Japan)

== Timekeepers ==
- Marco Rodrigues (Portugal)
- Valter Martins (Portugal)
- Ruben Guerreiro (Portugal)

== Group stage ==
=== Group A ===
Pl	Team	Pld	W	D	L	GF	GA	Pts
1	Brazil	4	4	0	0	30	3	12
2	Portugal	4	3	0	1	20	6	9
3	Japan	4	2	0	2	7	14	6
4	Iran	4	1	0	3	5	12	3
5	Venezuela	4	0	0	4	5	32	0

3 Dec 2012 17:00	Iran	2–1 (2–1)	Venezuela
3 Dec 2012 19:30	Portugal	5–1 (4–0)	Japan
4 Dec 2012 17:00	Brazil	6–1 (4–0)	Iran
4 Dec 2012 19:30	Portugal	10–1 (5–0)	Venezuela
5 Dec 2012 17:00	Japan	4–3 (2–0)	Venezuela
5 Dec 2012 19:30	Brazil	3–2 (1–1)	Portugal
6 Dec 2012 17:00	Brazil	16–0 (6–0)	Venezuela
6 Dec 2012 19:30	Japan	2–1 (2–0)	Iran
7 Dec 2012 19:30	Brazil	5–0 (3–0)	Japan
7 Dec 2012 19:30	Portugal	3–1 (2–1)	Iran

=== Group B ===
Pl	Team	Pld	W	D	L	GF	GA	Pts
1	Spain	4	4	0	0	20	0	12
2	Russia	4	3	0	1	18	5	9
3	Ukraine	4	2	0	2	19	5	6
4	Costa Rica	4	1	0	3	10	11	3
5	Malaysia	4	0	0	4	2	48	0

3 Dec 2012 11:00	Russia	11–1 (6–0)	Malaysia
3 Dec 2012 14:30	Ukraine	2–0 (1–0)	Costa Rica
4 Dec 2012 11:00	Spain	2–0 (1–0)	Ukraine
4 Dec 2012 14:30	Russia	4–1 (0–0)	Costa Rica
5 Dec 2012 11:00	Malaysia	1–9 (0–2)	Costa Rica
5 Dec 2012 14:30	Spain	3–0 (1–0)	Russia
6 Dec 2012 11:00	Spain	4–0 (1–0)	Costa Rica
6 Dec 2012 14:30	Malaysia	0–17 (0–9)	Ukraine
7 Dec 2012 17:00	Russia	3–0 (0–0)	Ukraine
7 Dec 2012 17:00	Spain	11–0 (4–0)	Malaysia

== Play-off round ==
Semifinals
8 December 2012 – Azeméis
Spain	0 (1)
Portugal (ps)	0 (3)
8 December 2012 – Azeméis
Brazil	1
Russia	0

Final
9 December 2012 – Azeméis
Portugal	0
Brazil	3
Third place
9 December 2012 – Azeméis
Spain	1
Russia	0

9th place
8 Dec 2012 11:00	Venezuela	8–1 (2–1)	Malaysia
7th place
8 Dec 2012 14:30	Iran	4–3 (4–1)	Costa Rica
Semifinals
8 Dec 2012 17:00	Spain	0–0 (ps 1–3)	Portugal
8 Dec 2012 19:30	Brazil	1–0 (0–0)	Russia
5th place
9 Dec 2012 11:00	Japan	0–4 (0–1)	Ukraine
3rd place
9 Dec 2012 14:30	Spain	1–0 (1–0)	Russia
Final
9 Dec 2012 17:00	Portugal	0–3 (0–2)	Brazil

== Final ranking ==
Rank	Team
Gold medal	Brazil
Silver medal	Portugal
Bronze medal	Spain
4	Russia
5	Ukraine
6	Japan
7	Iran
8	Costa Rica
9	Venezuela
10	Malaysia

Women's Futsal World Tournament
2012 winners

Brazil
3rd title
