= Beth McKay =

Footballer (born 1996)

Personal information
- Date of birth: 30 August 1996 (age 30)
- Height: 5 ft 2 in (1.57 m)
- Positions: Winger; left-back

Senior career*
Years	Team	Apps	(Gls)
2014–2021	Spartans	53	(11)
2021–2022	Hearts	23	(1)
2022–2023	Partick Thistle	5	(0)
2023–2024	Livingston	33	(17)

International career
- Northern Ireland
- * Club domestic league appearances and goals

Beth McKay (born 30 August 1996) is a footballer who last played as a winger and left-back for Livingston. She represents Northern Ireland for football and futsal.

== Career ==
McKay started her senior career when she was 17 years old, representing the University of Stirling. She played for the University side from 2014 to 2018. While at the club, she received her first international call-up for Northern Ireland in 2015 and received her first International caps in 2017. She also won the Daily Record goal of the season award for SWPL in the 2017–18 season for her goal against Hamilton Academic W.F.C. on 1 April 2018.

After graduating from the University of Stirling and completing her scholarship, McKay moved to Hibernian W.F.C. for a brief spell before moving to Spartans in 2019.

When at Spartans, McKay scored her only senior career hat-trick in just 9 minutes against Motherwell W.F.C. in the Scottish Cup. She then went on to win the club's Top Goal Scorer award that season.

McKay signed for Hearts from Spartans in 2021.

In 2022, McKay signed for Partick Thistle. The midfielder made just 5 appearances for the club.

The midfielder signed for Livingston in 2023.

McKay left in Livi in July 2024.
