= 2015 Women's Futsal World Tournament =

Tournament details
- Host country: Guatemala
- Dates: 24–29 November 2015
- Teams: 8 (from 4 confederations)
- Venue(s): Domo Polideportivo de la CDAG

Final positions
- Champions: Brazil (6th title)
- Runners-up: Russia
- Third place: Spain
- Fourth place: Portugal

Tournament statistics
- Matches played: 18
- Goals scored: 113 (6.28 per match)

The 2015 Women's Futsal World Tournament was the sixth edition of the Women's Futsal World Tournament, the premier world championship for women's national futsal teams. The venue was Domo Polideportivo de la CDAG in Guatemala City. The competition was won by Brazil, winner of all the editions disputed until then. Iran's Niloufar Ardalan notably defied a travel ban to take part in the 2015 tournament after her husband did not approve of her leaving Iran.

== Venues ==
| Arena | Domo Polideportivo de la CDAG |
|---|---|
| Picture | |
| City | Guatemala City |
| Capacity | 7,500 |
| Matches | Group A (6), Group B (6), Play-off round (6) |

== Group stage ==
Key to colours
(A) Advance to the semi-finals
Qualified to the 5th place game
Qualified to the 7th place game

=== Group A ===
| Team | Pld | W | D | L | GF | GA | GD | Pts |
|---|---|---|---|---|---|---|---|---|
| Brazil (A) | 3 | 2 | 1 | 0 | 16 | 1 | +15 | 7 |
| Portugal (A) | 3 | 2 | 1 | 0 | 11 | 3 | +8 | 7 |
| Costa Rica | 3 | 1 | 0 | 2 | 3 | 17 | −14 | 3 |
| Iran | 3 | 0 | 0 | 3 | 2 | 11 | −9 | 0 |

(A) Advance to a further round

| 24 Nov 2015 | Brazil | 9–0 (5–0) | Costa Rica |
| 24 Nov 2015 | Iran | 1–3 (1–1) | Portugal |
| 25 Nov 2015 | Portugal | 7–1 (3–0) | Costa Rica |
| 25 Nov 2015 | Iran | 0–6 (0–4) | Brazil |
| 26 Nov 2015 | Costa Rica | 2–1 (0–1) | Iran |
| 26 Nov 2015 | Brazil | 1–1 (0–0) | Portugal |

=== Group B ===
| Team | Pld | W | D | L | GF | GA | GD | Pts |
|---|---|---|---|---|---|---|---|---|
| Russia (A) | 3 | 2 | 1 | 0 | 5 | 1 | +4 | 7 |
| Spain (A) | 3 | 2 | 0 | 1 | 16 | 5 | +11 | 6 |
| Guatemala | 3 | 1 | 1 | 1 | 2 | 11 | −9 | 4 |
| Japan | 3 | 0 | 0 | 3 | 3 | 9 | −6 | 0 |

(A) Advance to a further round

| 24 Nov 2015 | Spain | 1–3 (0–3) | Russia |
| 24 Nov 2015 | Guatemala | 2–1 (2–0) | Japan |
| 25 Nov 2015 | Japan | 2–5 (1–2) | Spain |
| 25 Nov 2015 | Guatemala | 0–0 (0–0) | Russia |
| 26 Nov 2015 | Russia | 2–0 (0–0) | Japan |
| 26 Nov 2015 | Guatemala | 0–10 (0–4) | Spain |

== Final round ==
Semifinals
28 November
Brazil | 4
Spain | 0
28 November
Russia | 7
Portugal | 2

Final
29 November
Brazil | 3
Russia | 0
Third place
29 November
Spain | 9
Portugal | 1

7th place game
| 27 Nov 2015 | Iran | 2–1 (1–0) | Japan |
5th place game
| 27 Nov 2015 | Costa Rica | 2–1 (0–1) | Guatemala |
Semifinals
| 28 Nov 2015 | Brazil | 4–0 (1–0) | Spain |
| 28 Nov 2015 | Russia | 7–2 (2–1) | Portugal |
3rd place
| 29 Nov 2015 | Spain | 9–1 (4–0) | Portugal |
Final
| 29 Nov 2015 | Brazil | 3–0 (3–0) | Russia |

== Final ranking ==
| Rank | Team |
|---|---|
| 1st place, gold medalist(s) | Brazil |
| 2nd place, silver medalist(s) | Russia |
| 3rd place, bronze medalist(s) | Spain |
| 4 | Portugal |
| 5 | Costa Rica |
| 6 | Guatemala |
| 7 | Iran |
| 8 | Japan |

Women's Futsal World Tournament
2015 winners

Brazil
