= Brazil women's national futsal team =

Brazil
- Nickname(s): A Seleção (The Selection); As Canarinhas (The Female Canaries); Auriverde (Gold-and-Green); Verde-Amarela (Green-and-Yellow); Visión CONMEBOL
- Association: Brazilian Football Confederation
- Confederation: CONMEBOL (South America)
- Head coach: Wilson Saboia
- Top scorer: Luciléia
- FIFA code: BRA
- FIFA ranking: 1 (8 May 2026)
Home colours	Away colours

First international
- Brazil 1–0 Belgium (Rio de Janeiro, Brazil; 7 October 2000)

Biggest win
- Brazil 27–0 Malaysia (Ciudad Real, Spain; 15 December 2013)

Biggest defeat
- Brazil 0–6 Spain (Barueri, Brazil; 6 November 2005)

FIFA Futsal Women's World Cup
- Appearances: 1 (First in 2025)
- Best result: (gold) Champions (2025)

AMF World Cup
- Appearances: 2 (First in 2013)
- Best result: Champions (2017)

South American Championship
- Appearances: 9 (First in 2005)
- Best result: Champions - 8 titles

The Brazil women's national futsal team represents Brazil in international futsal competitions and is controlled by the Brazilian Football Confederation (CBF). The CBF has managed the futsal national teams program since 2021, taking over from the Brazilian Futsal Confederation (CBFS).

Brazil has played in all Women's Futsal World Tournaments and won all six tournaments. The 'Seleção' greatest achievement was being the first ever champion at FIFA Futsal Women’s World Cup.

== Squad ==
Squad announced for 2025 World Cup:

No.	Pos.	Player	Date of birth (age)	Caps	Goals	Club
1	GK	Bianca Castagnaro Moraes	6 January 1989 (age 37)	?	0	(Brazilian Football Confederation) Stein Cascavel Futsal
12	GK	Júlia Melz	20 November 1987 (age 38)	?	0	(Brazilian Football Confederation) GCR Nunalvares Futsal
2	DF	Camila Martins Pereira	10 October 1994 (age 31)	?	0	(Brazilian Football Confederation) Stein Cascavel Futsal
3	DF	Diana Santos	12 March 1992 (age 34)	?	0	(Italian Football Federation) Bitonto C5
4	DF	Tatiane Debiasi (Taty)	15 March 1987 (age 39)	?	0	(Brazilian Football Confederation) São Paulo Futsal
5	FW	Amanda Lyssa de Oliveira Crisóstomo (Amandinha)	5 September 1994 (age 31)	?	?	(Royal Spanish Football Federation) Torreblanca Melilla
6	FW	Emilly Rosbeyly Brito Jiménez	14 June 2001 (age 25)	?	?	(Royal Spanish Football Federation) Torreblanca Melilla
7	FW	Débora Vanin	18 February 1996 (age 30)	?	?	(Brazilian Football Confederation) São Paulo Futsal
8	FW	Luana Rodrigues	22 April 1997 (age 29)	?	?	(Brazilian Football Confederation) Flamengo Futsal
9	FW	Simone Costa	30 January 1995 (age 31)	?	?	(Brazilian Football Confederation) Corinthians Futsal
10	FW	Tamara Alves (Tampa)	3 November 1993 (age 32)	?	?	(Brazilian Football Confederation) Foz Cataratas Futsal
11	MF	Ana Luiza de Souza	10 February 1998 (age 28)	?	?	(Brazilian Football Confederation) São Paulo Futsal
12	MF	Lucileia de Oliveira	12 March 1990 (age 36)	?	?	(Brazilian Football Confederation) Corinthians Futsal
13	MF	Natalia Santos (Natalinha)	25 August 1995 (age 30)	?	?	(Brazilian Football Confederation) Foz Cataratas Futsal

== Tournament records ==
*Draws include knockout matches decided on penalty kicks.
**Gold background colour indicates that the tournament was won.
***Red border colour indicates tournament was held on home soil.

=== FIFA ===
==== FIFA Futsal Women's World Cup ====
FIFA Futsal Women's World Cup record
Year	Round	Position	Matches	Wins	Draws*	Losses	GF	GA
(Philippines) 2025	Final	Champions	6	6	0	0	32	4
Total:1/1	1 title		6	6	0	0	32	4

=== AMF ===
==== Futsal Women's World Cup ====
Year	Result	Matches	Wins	Draws*	Losses	GF	GA
(Catalonia) 2008	did not enter						
(Colombia) 2013	Group stage	3	0	0	3	6	13
(Catalonia) 2017	Champions	5	5	0	0	45	5
Total:2/3	1 title	8	5	0	3	51	18

*Draws include knockout matches decided on penalty kicks.

==== World Tournament ====
Year	Result	Matches	Wins	Draws*	Losses	GF	GA
(Spain) 2010	Champions	5	4	1	0	39	3
(Brazil) 2011	Champions	5	5	0	0	37	5
(Portugal) 2012	Champions	6	6	0	0	34	3
(Spain) 2013	Champions	6	5	1	0	43	4
(Costa Rica) 2014	Champions	5	5	0	0	26	6
(Guatemala) 2015	Champions	5	4	1	0	23	1
Total:6/6	6 titles	32	29	3	0	204	22

==== Copa América ====
Year	Result	Matches	Wins	Draws*	Losses	GF	GA
(Brazil) 2005	Champions	4	4	0	0	33	2
(Ecuador) 2007	Champions	4	4	0	0	22	5
(Brazil) 2009	Champions	4	4	0	0	38	2
(Venezuela) 2011	Champions	5	5	0	0	42	3
(Uruguay) 2015	did not enter						
(Uruguay) 2017	Champions	6	6	0	0	45	1
(Paraguay) 2019	Champions	6	6	0	0	47	4
(Argentina) 2023	Champions	6	6	0	0	51	1
(Brazil) 2025	Champions	6	6	0	0	38	1
Total:8/9	8 Titles	41	41	0	0	316	19

=== Brazil International Futsal Cup ===
- Grand Prix de Futsal 2019 - 1st Place
- Grand Prix de Futsal 2023 - 1st Place
- Grand Prix de Futsal 2024 - 1st Place

== See also ==
- Futsal in Brazil
- Brazil national futsal team (men's national team)
