= UEFA Women's Futsal Euro 2019 =

Tournament details
- Host country: Final tournament: Portugal
- City: Gondomar
- Dates: Qualifying rounds: 21 August – 15 September 2018; Final tournament: 15–17 February 2019
- Teams: Final tournament: 4 Qualifying: 23 (from 1 confederation)
- Venue: Final tournament: 1 (in 1 host city)

Final positions
- Champions: Spain (1st title)
- Runners-up: Portugal
- Third place: Russia
- Fourth place: Ukraine

Tournament statistics
- Matches played: 40
- Goals scored: 287 (7.18 per match)
- Top scorer(s): Season: (Spain) Vanessa Sotelo (10 goals); Final tournament: (Spain) Amelia Romero (3 goals)
- Best player: (Spain) Vanessa Sotelo

The 2019 UEFA Women's Futsal Championship, also referred to as UEFA Women's Futsal Euro 2019, was the first edition of the UEFA Women's Futsal Championship, the biennial international futsal championship organised by UEFA for the women's national teams of Europe.

Spain won the title to become the first UEFA Women's Futsal Euro champions.

== Teams ==
A total of 23 (out of 55) UEFA member national teams entered the qualifying stage, with Northern Ireland taking part in their first international futsal tournament for men or women. They are seeded according to the coefficient ranking of their men's senior national teams, calculated based on the following:

- UEFA Futsal Euro 2016 final tournament and qualifying competition
- 2016 FIFA Futsal World Cup final tournament and qualifying competition
- UEFA Futsal Euro 2018 final tournament and qualifying competition

The 13 highest-ranked teams entered the main round, while the 10 lowest-ranked teams entered the preliminary round. The coefficient ranking was also used for seeding in the preliminary round and main round draws, where each team was assigned a seeding position according to their ranking for the respective draw. Three teams were pre-selected as hosts for the preliminary round and four teams were pre-selected as hosts for the main round.

The draws for the preliminary round and main round were held on 5 July 2018, 13:30 CEST (UTC+2), at the UEFA headquarters in Nyon, Switzerland. The mechanism of the draws for each round is as follows:

- In the preliminary round, the 10 teams were drawn into three groups: one group of four containing one team from each of the seeding positions 1–4, and two groups of three containing one team from each of the seeding positions 1–3. First, the three teams which were pre-selected as hosts were drawn from their own designated pot and allocated to their respective group as per their seeding positions. Next, the remaining seven teams were drawn from their respective pot which were allocated according to their seeding positions (the lowest-ranked teams were allocated first to seeding position 4, then seeding position 3).
- In the main round, the 16 teams were drawn into four groups of four, containing one team from each of the seeding positions 1–4. First, the four teams which were pre-selected as hosts were drawn from their own designated pot and allocated to their respective group as per their seeding positions. Next, the remaining 12 teams were drawn from their respective pot which were allocated according to their seeding positions (including the three preliminary round winners, whose identity was not known at the time of the draw, which were allocated to seeding position 4). Based on the decisions taken by the UEFA Emergency Panel, Russia and Ukraine would not be drawn into the same group.

Participating teams for UEFA Women's Futsal Euro 2019

Teams entering main round
Team	Coeff	Rank	Seed
**Russia**	10.171	1	1
**Spain** **(H)**	10.022	2	1
**Portugal** **(H)**	9.633	3	1
Kazakhstan	9.000	4	1
**Ukraine** **(H)**	8.389	5	2
Italy	7.444	7	2
Serbia	6.833	8	2
Slovenia	6.500	9	2
Croatia **(H)**	4.278	10	3
Hungary	4.111	11	3
Czech Republic	3.611	12	3
Romania	3.500	13	3
Poland	3.389	14	4

Teams entering preliminary round
Team	Coeff	Rank	Seed
Slovakia	2.944	16	1
Belarus	2.889	17	1
Netherlands	2.278	18	1
Belgium	2.111	20	2
Finland	1.694	23	2
Moldova **(H)**	0.833	26	2
Sweden	0.778	29	3 or 4
Armenia	0.500	36	3 or 4
Lithuania **(H)**	0.389	40	3 or 4
Northern Ireland **(H)**	—	—	3 or 4

Notes

- Teams marked in **bold** have qualified for the final tournament.
- (H): Teams pre-selected as hosts for the preliminary round and the main round

== Format ==
In the preliminary round and main round, each group is played as a round-robin mini-tournament at the pre-selected hosts.

In the final tournament, the four qualified teams play in knockout format (semi-finals, third place match, and final), either at a host selected by UEFA from one of the teams, or at a neutral venue if none of the teams wishes to host.

=== Tiebreakers ===
In the preliminary round and main round, teams are ranked according to points (3 points for a win, 1 point for a draw, 0 points for a loss), and if tied on points, the following tiebreaking criteria are applied, in the order given, to determine the rankings (Regulations Articles 14.01 and 14.02):

1. Points in head-to-head matches among tied teams;
2. Goal difference in head-to-head matches among tied teams;
3. Goals scored in head-to-head matches among tied teams;
4. If more than two teams are tied, and after applying all head-to-head criteria above, a subset of teams are still tied, all head-to-head criteria above are reapplied exclusively to this subset of teams;
5. Goal difference in all group matches;
6. Goals scored in all group matches;
7. Penalty shoot-out if only two teams have the same number of points, and they met in the last round of the group and are tied after applying all criteria above (not used if more than two teams have the same number of points, or if their rankings are not relevant for qualification for the next stage);
8. Disciplinary points (red card = 3 points, yellow card = 1 point, expulsion for two yellow cards in one match = 3 points);
9. UEFA coefficient;
10. Drawing of lots.

== Schedule ==
The schedule of the competition is as follows.

Schedule for UEFA Women's Futsal Euro 2019
Round	Draw	Dates
Preliminary round	5 July 2018	21–26 August 2018
Main round	5 July 2018	11–16 September 2018
Final tournament	9 December 2018	Semi-finals: 15 February 2019; Third place match & Final: 17 February 2019

In the preliminary round and main round, the schedule of each group is as follows, with one rest day between matchdays 2 and 3 for four-team groups, and no rest days for three-team groups (Regulations Articles 18.04, 18.05 and 18.06):

Note: For scheduling, the hosts are considered as Team 1, while the visiting teams are considered as Team 2, Team 3, and Team 4 according to their seeding positions.

Group schedule
Matchday	Matches (4 teams)	Matches (3 teams)
Matchday 1	2 v 4, 1 v 3	1 v 3
Matchday 2	3 v 2, 1 v 4	3 v 2
Matchday 3	4 v 3, 2 v 1	2 v 1

== Preliminary round ==
The winners of each group advance to the main round to join the 13 teams which receive byes.

Times are CEST (UTC+2), as listed by UEFA (local times, if different, are in parentheses).

=== Group A ===
Pos	Team	Pld	W	D	L	GF	GA	GD	Pts	Qualification
1	Sweden	3	3	0	0	21	10	+11	9	Main round
2	Netherlands	3	1	1	1	11	10	+1	4	
3	Belgium	3	1	1	1	10	14	−4	4	
4	Northern Ireland (H)	3	0	0	3	8	16	−8	0	

Source: UEFA
Rules for classification: Qualifying tiebreakers
(H) Hosts
21 August 2018
16:00 (15:00 BST)

Netherlands	4–5	Sweden
De Vos 14:29; Oliveira 20:21; Huizinga 37:13, 38:04	Report	Vaseghpanah 8:35, 36:40; Chamoun 22:26; Jansson 26:42; Kogsta 28:03

Newry Leisure Centre, Newry
Referee: Adrian Tschopp (Switzerland), Arttu Kyynaeraeinen (Finland)
21 August 2018
20:00 (19:00 BST)

Northern Ireland	3–4	Belgium
Mearns 13:16; McKay 16:08; Dempster 32:58	Report	Van Roie 4:01; Courtois 14:16; Verdonck 17:56; Toloba 30:09

Newry Leisure Centre, Newry
Referee: Patrik Porkert (Austria), Daniel Deca (Romania)

22 August 2018
16:00 (15:00 BST)

Belgium	3–3	Netherlands
Van Roie 23:20, 38:11; Toloba 37:04	Report	Schepers 8:49, 35:23; Oliveira 26:05

Newry Leisure Centre, Newry
Referee: Daniel Deca (Romania), Adrian Tschopp (Switzerland)
22 August 2018
20:00 (19:00 BST)

Northern Ireland	3–8	Sweden
Weatherall 6:14; Harkness 31:32; McKay 40:17	Report	Vaseghpanah 5:42, 14:42; Chamoun 11:54, 19:45; Varli 22:03, 23:12; Aguilar 29:20, 35:56

Newry Leisure Centre, Newry
Referee: Arttu Kyynaeraeinen (Finland), Patrik Porkert (Austria)

24 August 2018
16:00 (15:00 BST)

Sweden	8–3	Belgium
Varli 14:46, 20:42, 32:14; Vaseghpanah 19:35 (pen.), 22:22; Aguilar 28:48; Chamoun 35:38; Hjelm 38:38	Report	Toloba 2:20, 18:57 (pen.); Bourtembourg 19:15

Newry Leisure Centre, Newry
Referee: Daniel Deca (Romania), Arttu Kyynaeraeinen (Finland)
24 August 2018
20:00 (19:00 BST)

Netherlands	4–2	Northern Ireland
Prijs 0:11; Van Ee 6:51, 29:13; Brueren 34:03	Report	Caldwell 10:07; McFrederick 36:50

Newry Leisure Centre, Newry
Referee: Adrian Tschopp (Switzerland), Patrik Porkert (Austria)

=== Group B ===
Pos	Team	Pld	W	D	L	GF	GA	GD	Pts	Qualification
1	Finland	2	2	0	0	13	2	+11	6	Main round
2	Slovakia	2	0	1	1	3	4	−1	1	
3	Lithuania (H)	2	0	1	1	1	11	−10	1	

Source: UEFA
Rules for classification: Qualifying tiebreakers
(H) Hosts
22 August 2018
18:00 (19:00 EEST)

Lithuania	0–10	Finland
	Report	Hannula 2:29; Tjeder 4:37, 40:31; Sutinen 8:04; Pöyry 8:51, 23:09; Juntikka 20:53; Häkli 23:35; Jokisalo 28:14, 39:30

Prienai Arena, Prienai
Referee: Veljko Bošković (Montenegro), Ugur Cakmak (Turkey)

23 August 2018
16:00 (17:00 EEST)

Finland	3–2	Slovakia
Hannula 4:30; Jokisalo 11:08; Juntikka 25:11	Report	Wienerová 0:40, 31:12

Prienai Arena, Prienai
Referee: Ugur Cakmak (Turkey), Yevhen Hordiienko (Ukraine)

24 August 2018
18:00 (19:00 EEST)

Slovakia	1–1	Lithuania
Baniková 39:05 (2pen.)	Report	Potapova 38:23

Prienai Arena, Prienai
Referee: Yevhen Hordiienko (Ukraine), Ugur Cakmak (Turkey)

=== Group C ===
Pos	Team	Pld	W	D	L	GF	GA	GD	Pts	Qualification
1	Belarus	2	1	1	0	8	5	+3	4	Main round
2	Armenia	2	1	0	1	3	5	−2	3	
3	Moldova (H)	2	0	1	1	3	4	−1	1	

Source: UEFA
Rules for classification: Qualifying tiebreakers
(H) Hosts
21 August 2018
15:00 (16:00 EEST)

Moldova	0–1	Armenia
	Report	Karapetyan 4:55

FMF Arena, Ciorescu
Referee: Yusif Nurullayev (Azerbaijan), Jacob Pawlowski (Germany)

22 August 2018
15:00 (16:00 EEST)

Armenia	2–5	Belarus
Hovhanisyan 9:45; Khachatryan 27:01 (pen.)	Report	Lutskevich 13:50; Linnik 16:15, 17:27, 32:52; Popova 38:45

FMF Arena, Ciorescu
Referee: Kreshnik Hakrama (Albania), Yusif Nurullayev (Azerbaijan)

23 August 2018
15:00 (16:00 EEST)

Belarus	3–3	Moldova
Buyko 31:20; Linnik 34:27; Popova 36:41	Report	Ciobanu 24:08, 24:56; Caraman 40:34

FMF Arena, Ciorescu
Referee: Jacob Pawlowski (Germany), Kreshnik Hakrama (Albania)

== Main round ==
The winners of each group advance to the final tournament.

Times are CEST (UTC+2), as listed by UEFA (local times, if different, are in parentheses).

=== Group 1 ===
Pos	Team	Pld	W	D	L	GF	GA	GD	Pts	Qualification
1	Spain (H)	3	3	0	0	26	1	+25	9	Final tournament
2	Italy	3	2	0	1	14	9	+5	6	
3	Poland	3	1	0	2	5	16	−11	3	
4	Romania	3	0	0	3	5	24	−19	0	

Source: UEFA
Rules for classification: Qualifying tiebreakers
(H) Hosts
12 September 2018
16:00

Italy	6–1	Poland
Giuliano 0:46; Belli 11:03; Da Silva 14:54, 25:54; Xhiaxho 21:04; D'Incecco 39:49	Report	Włodarczyk 6:18

Pabellón Europa, Leganés
Referee: Petar Radojcic (Serbia), Marjan Mladenovski (Macedonia)
12 September 2018
18:30

Spain	12–1	Romania
Ampi 0:18, 6:55, 21:07, 29:33; Anita 5:16; Mayte 9:28; Sotelo 11:09, 16:44, 24:43, 31:31, 36:26; Campoy 14:26	Report	Ion 25:09

Pabellón Europa, Leganés
Referee: Irina Velikanova (Russia), Aleš Mocnik Peric (Slovenia)

13 September 2018
18:00

Romania	2–8	Italy
Raduc 29:12; Barabaşi 32:51	Report	Da Silva 0:15 (pen.); Belli 5:23; Luciani 11:40; D'Incecco 12:59; Mansueto 20:36; Giuliano 27:19 (pen.), 37:10; Pomposelli 28:21

Pabellón Europa, Leganés
Referee: Marjan Mladenovsk (Macedonia), Irina Velikanova (Russia)
13 September 2018
20:30

Spain	8–0	Poland
Romero 7:27; Sotelo 8:13, 22:48; Anita 21:18; Mayte 26:25; García 28:25, 34:56; Samper 29:13	Report

Pabellón Europa, Leganés
Referee: Aleš Mocnik Peric (Slovenia), Petar Radojcic (Serbia)

15 September 2018
16:30

Poland	4–2	Romania
Włodarczyk 8:51; Lichtenstein 14:48, 19:58; Zajaç 15:34	Report	Barabaşi 11:49, 18:23

Pabellón Europa, Leganés
Referee: Irina Velikanova (Russia), Marjan Mladenovski (Macedonia)
15 September 2018
19:00

Italy	0–6	Spain
	Report	Velasco 5:07; Mayte 17:59; Sotelo 18:37; Peque 20:34; Romero 29:19; Ampi 30:29

Pabellón Europa, Leganés
Referee: Petar Radojcic (Serbia), Aleš Mocnik Peric (Slovenia)

=== Group 2 ===
Pos	Team	Pld	W	D	L	GF	GA	GD	Pts	Qualification
1	Russia	3	2	1	0	16	2	+14	7	Final tournament
2	Croatia (H)	3	2	0	1	9	13	−4	6	
3	Sweden	3	1	1	1	9	6	+3	4	
4	Slovenia	3	0	0	3	3	16	−13	0	

Source: UEFA
Rules for classification: Qualifying tiebreakers
(H) Hosts
12 September 2018
16:30

Russia	2–2	Sweden
Fedorova 30:35; Vorobey 31:43	Report	Chamoun 7:55, 35:56

Mladost Hall, Karlovac
Referee: Ingus Puriņš (Latvia), Mario Bohun (Slovakia)
12 September 2018
19:00

Croatia	6–2	Slovenia
Matijevic 5:21, 19:21, 31:10, 38:39; Brkan 24:01; Horvat 26:58	Report	Vojsk 25:02; Vrabel 33:51

Mladost Hall, Karlovac
Referee: Chiara Perona (Italy), Vlad Nicolae Ciobanu (Romania)

13 September 2018
16:30

Slovenia	0–5	Russia
	Report	Fedorova 9:26; Olkova 17:47; Korzhova 24:35; Samorodova 28:02; Danilova 34:54

Mladost Hall, Karlovac
Referee: Chiara Perona (Italy), Ingus Puriņš (Latvia)
13 September 2018
19:00

Croatia	3–2	Sweden
Matijevic 22:35, 36:38; Nemčić 26:54	Report	Hjelm 19:53; Varli 20:48

Mladost Hall, Karlovac
Referee: Vlad Nicolae Ciobanu (Romania), Ingus Puriņš (Latvia)

15 September 2018
16:30

Sweden	5–1	Slovenia
Kogsta 20:32, 29:48; Varli 25:06; Poli 34:46; Hjelm 37:29	Report	Vrabel 17:39

Mladost Hall, Karlovac
Referee: Vlad Nicolae Ciobanu (Romania), Balázs Farkas (Hungary)
15 September 2018
19:00

Russia	9–0	Croatia
Olkova 12:01, 12:34; Brkan 19:45 (o.g.); Durandina 22:46; Vorobey 24:54; Krupina 26:32, 34:40; Tomic 29:28 (o.g.); Danilova 29:41	Report

Mladost Hall, Karlovac
Referee: Chiara Perona (Italy), Ingus Puriņš (Latvia)

=== Group 3 ===
Pos	Team	Pld	W	D	L	GF	GA	GD	Pts	Qualification
1	Ukraine (H)	3	2	1	0	15	6	+9	7	Final tournament
2	Hungary	3	2	1	0	16	11	+5	7	
3	Belarus	3	1	0	2	13	8	+5	3	
4	Kazakhstan	3	0	0	3	4	23	−19	0	

Source: UEFA
Rules for classification: Qualifying tiebreakers
(H) Hosts
12 September 2018
16:00 (17:00 EEST)

Kazakhstan	0–8	Belarus
	Report	Popova 0:44, 15:30, 26:21; Linnik 4:42 (pen.), 6:17, 26:39; Pelyovina 7:05, 29:57

Budivelnyk Sports Palace, Cherkasy
Referee: Stefan Vrijens (Belgium), Valentin Ciuplea (Wales)
12 September 2018
18:30 (19:30 EEST)

Ukraine	4–4	Hungary
Dudarchuk 12:31 (2pen.); Forsiuk 20:29; Sydorenko 22:07; Babenko 22:27	Report	Kota 6:47, 29:01; Sipos 10:11; Sagaidachna 31:47 (o.g.)

Budivelnyk Sports Palace, Cherkasy
Referee: Nicola Manzione (Italy), Yiangos Yiangou (Cyprus)

13 September 2018
16:00 (17:00 EEST)

Hungary	8–4	Kazakhstan
Kracsenics 10:59, 23:48; Kota 12:26 (pen.), 35:26, 39:55; Csepregi 19:29; Szabó 27:50; Gál 28:01	Report	Szabó 0:45 (o.g.); Karazhanova 13:39; Kirgibaeva 30:26; Sadvakassova 32:07

Budivelnyk Sports Palace, Cherkasy
Referee: Valentin Ciuplea (Wales), Nicola Manzione (Italy)
13 September 2018
18:30 (19:30 EEST)

Ukraine	4–2	Belarus
Forsiuk 21:25; Dubytska 25:59; Dudarchuk 29:56; Sydorenko 38:34 (pen.)	Report	Popova 1:50, 14:09

Budivelnyk Sports Palace, Cherkasy
Referee: Yiangos Yiangou (Cyprus), Stefan Vrijens (Belgium)

15 September 2018
14:30 (15:30 EEST)

Belarus	3–4	Hungary
Shatsilenia 11:16; Kharlanova 14:11; Slesarchik 25:48	Report	Krascsenics 4:01; Gelb 5:34; Szabó 11:47, 36:41

Budivelnyk Sports Palace, Cherkasy
Referee: Nicola Manzione (Italy), Stefan Vrijens (Belgium)
15 September 2018
17:00 (18:00 EEST)

Kazakhstan	0–7	Ukraine
	Report	Vlassova 0:56 (o.g.); Dubytska 4:43; Dudarchuk 16:36 (2pen.); Karazhanova 21:53 (o.g.); Sydorenko 24:23; Volovenko 25:31; Forsiuk 25:54 (pen.)

Budivelnyk Sports Palace, Cherkasy
Referee: Valentin Ciuplea (Wales), Yiangos Yiangou (Cyprus)

=== Group 4 ===
Pos	Team	Pld	W	D	L	GF	GA	GD	Pts	Qualification
1	Portugal (H)	3	3	0	0	26	1	+25	9	Final tournament
2	Finland	3	2	0	1	15	7	+8	6	
3	Czech Republic	3	1	0	2	9	18	−9	3	
4	Serbia	3	0	0	3	2	26	−24	0	

Source: UEFA
Rules for classification: Qualifying tiebreakers
(H) Hosts
12 September 2018
18:00 (17:00 WEST)

Serbia	2–8	Finland
Izgarević 19:06; Čanović 30:11	Report	Kykkänen 1:31, 20:44; Juntikka 6:59, 26:50, 38:18; Sutinen 18:43; Jokisalo 28:18; Keränen 32:07

Pavilhão Dr. Salvador Machado, Oliveira de Azeméis
Referee: Simon Todorovič (Slovenia), Maksim Dzeikala (Belarus)
12 September 2018
20:30 (19:30 WEST)

Portugal	12–0	Czech Republic
Janice Silva 1:42, 24:38; Lídia Moreira 7:05, 27:14, 29:25; Carla Vanessa 8:45, 38:38; Jenny 10:37; Azevedo 26:30; Ferreira 38:10, 39:50; Pisko 39:02	Report

Pavilhão Dr. Salvador Machado, Oliveira de Azeméis
Referee: Yaroslav Vovchok (Ukraine), Damian Jaruchiewicz (Poland)

13 September 2018
18:00 (17:00 WEST)

Czech Republic	7–0	Serbia
Hýlová 3:28, 33:02; Koplíkova 6:31; Odehnalová 7:45, 24:21, 29:50; Plzakova 36:43	Report

Pavilhão Dr. Salvador Machado, Oliveira de Azeméis
Referee: Maksim Dzeikala (Belarus), Yaroslav Vovchok (Ukraine)
13 September 2018
20:30 (19:30 WEST)

Portugal	3–1	Finland
Jenny 5:50; Catia Morgado 18:27; Ana Catarina 39:59	Report	Pöyry 12:45

Pavilhão Dr. Salvador Machado, Oliveira de Azeméis
Referee: Damian Jaruchiewicz (Poland), Simon Todorovič (Slovenia)

15 September 2018
17:00 (16:00 WEST)

Finland	6–2	Czech Republic
Setälä 4:16, 8:25; Hannula 29:09; Juntikka 29:29; Odehnalová 33:29 (o.g.); Tjeder 35:10	Report	Hýlová 24:30, 36:32

Pavilhão Dr. Salvador Machado, Oliveira de Azeméis
Referee: Yaroslav Vovchok (Ukraine), Damian Jaruchiewicz (Poland)
15 September 2018
19:30 (18:30 WEST)

Serbia	0–11	Portugal
	Report	Ferreira 1:01, 9:35; Catia Morgado 3:26, 22:12, 34:53; Carla Vanessa 7:10, 26:17; Taninha 16:18; Jenny 17:21, 39:54; Janice Silva 36:16

Pavilhão Dr. Salvador Machado, Oliveira de Azeméis
Referee: Simon Todorovič (Slovenia), Maksim Dzeikala (Belarus)

== Final tournament ==
The hosts of the final tournament were selected from the four qualified teams. Portugal's bid was selected over that of Spain by the UEFA Executive Committee on 27 September 2018, with the final tournament taking place at the Pavilhão Multiusos de Gondomar in Gondomar of the Porto Metropolitan Area, which previously hosted the 2007 UEFA Futsal Championship final tournament.

=== Qualified teams ===
The following teams qualified for the final tournament.

Team	Method of qualification	Date of qualification
Spain	Main round Group 1 winners	15 September 2018
Russia	Main round Group 2 winners	15 September 2018
Ukraine	Main round Group 3 winners	15 September 2018
Portugal (hosts)	Main round Group 4 winners	14 September 2018

=== Final draw ===
The draw for the final tournament was held on 9 December 2018, 12:30 WET (UTC±0), at the Casa Branca de Gramido in Valbom, Portugal. The four teams were drawn into two semi-finals without any restrictions on Russia vs Ukraine

=== Squads ===
Each national team have to submit a squad of 14 players, two of whom must be goalkeepers.

=== Bracket ===
In the semi-finals and final, extra time and penalty shoot-out are used to decide the winner if necessary; however, no extra time is used in the third place match (Regulations Article 16.02 and 16.03).

Semi-finals
15 February – Gondomar
Russia	0
Spain	5
15 February – Gondomar
Ukraine	1
Portugal	5

Final
17 February – Gondomar
Spain	4
Portugal	0
Third place match
17 February – Gondomar
Russia (p)	2 (3)
Ukraine	2 (2)

Times are CET (UTC+1), as listed by UEFA (local times are in parentheses).

=== Semi-finals ===
15 February 2019
20:00 (19:00 WET)

Russia	0–5	Spain
	Report	Sotelo 17:33; Romero 19:35, 25:56; Gómez González 22:10; Samper 37:39

Pavilhão Multiusos de Gondomar, Gondomar
Referee: Gelareh Nazemideylami (Iran), Zari Fathi (Iran)

15 February 2019
22:45 (21:45 WET)

Ukraine	1–5	Portugal
Sydorenko 21:51	Report	Janice Silva 13:26, 38:18; Fifó 27:32, 39:06; Carla Vanessa 32:29

Pavilhão Multiusos de Gondomar, Gondomar
Referee: Irina Velikanova (Russia), Raquel Gonzalez Ruano (Spain)

=== Third place match ===
17 February 2019
17:00 (16:00 WET)

Russia	2–2	Ukraine
Danilova 8:22; Lebedeva 14:46	Report	Volovenko 17:56 (2pen.); Tytova 28:23 (pen.)
Penalties
Filisova (penalty scored); Chernova (penalty scored); Olkova (penalty scored)	3–2	(penalty scored) Dubytska; (penalty scored) Volovenko; (penalty missed) Forsiuk

Pavilhão Multiusos de Gondomar, Gondomar
Referee: Raquel Gonzalez Ruano (Spain), Zari Fathi (Iran)

=== Final ===
17 February 2019
19:30 (18:30 WET)

Spain	4–0	Portugal
Mayte 3:02; Anita 5:10; Romero 9:30; Sotelo 35:55	Report

Pavilhão Multiusos de Gondomar, Gondomar
Attendance: 2,860
Referee: Chiara Perona (Italy), Irina Velikanova (Russia)

== Top goalscorers ==
- Preliminary round: There were 81 goals scored in 12 matches, for an average of 6.75 goals per match.
- Main round: There were 187 goals scored in 24 matches, for an average of 7.79 goals per match.
- Final tournament: There were 19 goals scored in 4 matches, for an average of 4.75 goals per match.

— Team eliminated / inactive for this stage.

Rank	Player	PR	MR	FT	Total
1	(Spain) Vanessa Sotelo	—	8	2	10
2	(Belarus) Anastasia Linnik	4	3	—	7
2	(Belarus) Anastasia Popova	2	5	—	7
2	(Sweden) Susan Varli	5	2	—	7
5	(Croatia) Tomislava Matijevic	—	6	—	6
5	(Finland) Tiia Juntikka	2	4	—	6
5	(Sweden) Daniella Chamoun	4	2	—	6
5	(Sweden) Nazanin Vaseghpanah	6	0	—	6
9	(Hungary) Gabriella Kota	—	5	—	5
9	(Portugal) Janice Silva	—	3	2	5
9	(Portugal) Carla Vanessa	—	4	1	5
9	(Spain) Ampi	—	5	0	5
9	(Spain) Amélia Romero	—	2	3	5

Source: UEFA.com

== Broadcasting ==
For the final four round

=== Participating nations ===
Country/Region	Broadcaster
Portugal (host)	RTP
Russia	Match TV
Spain	RFEF TV
Ukraine	XSPORT

=== Non-participating European nations and outside Europe ===
Country/Regional	Broadcaster
International (unsold markets only)	YouTube
Balkan countries: Bosnia and Herzegovina; Croatia; Macedonia; Montenegro; Serbia; Slovenia	YouTube
Balkan countries: Bosnia and Herzegovina; Croatia; Macedonia; Montenegro; Serbia; Slovenia	Sport Klub
China	CCTV
Latin American countries: Argentina; Bolivia; Chile; Colombia; Costa Rica; Dominican Republic; Ecuador; El Salvador; Guatemala; Honduras; Mexico; Nicaragua; Panama; Paraguay; Peru; Puerto Rico; Uruguay; Venezuela	ESPN; Univision Deportes (Puerto Rico and USA only)
United States	ESPN; Univision Deportes (Puerto Rico and USA only)
MENA: Algeria; Bahrain; Chad; Comoros; Djibouti; Egypt; Iran; Iraq; Jordan; Kuwait; Lebanon; Libya; Mauritania; Morocco; Oman; Qatar; Saudi Arabia; Somalia; Palestine; Sudan; Syria; Tunisia; United Arab Emirates; Yemen	beIN Sports
