= 2014 Women's Futsal World Tournament =

Tournament details
- Host country: Costa Rica
- Dates: 10–15 December 2014
- Teams: 7 (from 4 confederations)
- Venue(s): BN Arena

Final positions
- Champions: Brazil (5th title)
- Runners-up: Portugal
- Third place: Spain
- Fourth place: Costa Rica

Tournament statistics
- Matches played: 14
- Goals scored: 78 (5.57 per match)

The 2014 Women's Futsal World Tournament was the fifth edition of the Women's Futsal World Tournament, the premier world championship for women's national futsal teams. The competition was to be hosted in Russia, but was moved to Hatillo District, in Costa Rica.

== Venues ==
Arena	BN Arena
Picture	
City	Hatillo District
Capacity	5,200
Matches	Group A (6), Group B (3), Play-off round (5)

== Referees ==
- José Francisco Katemo (Angola)
- Geovanny López Munguía (Costa Rica)
- Jeisson Peñaloza Cruz (Costa Rica)
- Ronny Castro Zumbado (Costa Rica)
- Diego Molina López (Costa Rica)
- Sergio Enrique Cabrera Acosta (Cuba)
- Roberto Michel Sánchez Álvarez (Cuba)
- Jorge Antonio Flores Hernández (El Salvador)
- Carlos Enrique González Sánchez (Guatemala)
- Deon Feassal (Guyana)
- Francisco Javier Rivera Llerenas (Mexico)
- Wenceslaos Aguilar Díaz (Panama)
- Luis Alberto Aguilar Racero (Panama)
- Shane Butler (United States)
- Renata Leite Neves (Brazil)
- Raquel González Ruano (Spain)
- Miguel López González (Cuba)
- Leroy Rafael Brown Gómez (Guatemala)

== Group stage ==
=== Group A ===
Team	Pld	W	D	L	GF	GA	GD	Pts
Brazil	3	3	0	0	14	2	+12	9
Portugal	3	2	0	1	8	4	+4	6
Japan	3	1	0	2	3	12	−9	3
Russia	3	0	0	3	3	10	−7	0

10 Dec 2014	Japan	0–4 (0–1)	Portugal
10 Dec 2014	Brazil	5–0 (1–0)	Russia
11 Dec 2014	Russia	2–3 (1–1)	Japan
11 Dec 2014	Portugal	2–3 (1–2)	Brazil
12 Dec 2014	Portugal	2–1 (0–1)	Russia
12 Dec 2014	Brazil	6–0 (5–0)	Japan

=== Group B ===
Team	Pld	W	D	L	GF	GA	GD	Pts
Spain	2	2	0	0	12	0	+12	6
Costa Rica	2	1	0	1	3	5	−2	3
Guatemala	2	0	0	2	1	11	−10	0

10 Dec 2014	Costa Rica	0–4 (0–1)	Spain
11 Dec 2014	Spain	8–0 (4–0)	Guatemala
12 Dec 2014	Costa Rica	3–1 (1–1)	Guatemala

== Final round ==
Semifinals
14 December
Spain	2
Portugal	3
14 December
Brazil	8
Costa Rica	1

Final
15 December
Portugal	3
Brazil	4
Third place
15 December
Spain	8
Costa Rica	2

Semifinals
14 Dec 2014	Spain	2–3 (1–1)	Portugal
14 Dec 2014	Brazil	8–1 (4–0)	Costa Rica
5th place
14 Dec 2014	Japan	1–2 (1–0)	Guatemala
3rd place
15 Dec 2014	Spain	8–2 (5–2)	Costa Rica
Final
15 Dec 2014	Portugal	3–4 (1–1)	Brazil

== Final ranking ==
Rank	Team
1st place, gold medalist(s)	Brazil
2nd place, silver medalist(s)	Portugal
3rd place, bronze medalist(s)	Spain
4	Costa Rica
5	Guatemala
6	Japan
7	Russia

Women's Futsal World Tournament
2014 winners

Brazil
5th title
