= Ukraine women's national futsal team =

Ukraine
- Shirt badge/Association crest
- Nickname(s): (Жовто-Сині)Zhovto-Blakytni ("the Yellow-Blues")
- Association: Ukrainian Association of Football
- Confederation: UEFA (Europe)
- FIFA code: UKR
- FIFA ranking: 14 (24 September 2026)
Home colours	Away colours

First international
- Spain 7–1 Ukraine (Elche, Spain; 21 November 1997)

Biggest win
- Ukraine 17–0 Malaysia (Oliveira de Azeméis, Portugal; 6 December 2012); Ukraine 17–0 Malaysia (Ciudad Real, Spain; 14 December 2013)

Biggest defeat
- Portugal 8–0 Ukraine (Elche, Spain; 23 November 1997)

Euro
- Appearances: 3 (First in 2019)
- Best result: Runner-up (2023)

The Ukraine women's national futsal team represents Ukraine in international futsal competitions and is controlled by the Ukrainian Association of Football.

== History ==
On 21 November 1997, the Ukraine held their first match with the Spain at the international tournament "Elche 1997". In total, the team played three matches in this tournament, two of which were lost to Spain and Portugal and one was won by Russia. The team was formed on the basis of Poltava "Nika". After that, the team did not play again for the next ten years.

In 2007, after a long break, Ukraine held another match, which became the first home match in their history, the opponent was Uzbekistan in whom they defeated 7–1. This time the team was formed on the basis of the club "Bilychanka-NPU".

In 2010, the Ukraine won the international futsal tournament "Victory Day" (Moscow, Russia), the national teams of Iran, Russia and Hungary also competed there.

In 2011, Ukraine became a bronze medalist of the international futsal tournament in Mór, Hungary and for the second time took part in the Victory Day tournament, where they also won bronze medals. In addition, in late February, the team flew to Iran, where he played three friendly games with the local team, all of which they won.

=== 2012 Women's Futsal World Tournament ===
In 2012, Ukraine took part in the Women's Futsal World Tournament, where they finished in 5th place and set several records: the fastest goal (Yulia Titova in the 36th second of the match with Malaysia), the most goals scored by one player (17-year-old Anna Shulga scored 5 times in the match against Malaysia), the biggest victory in the history of the Women's Futsal World Tournament (victory over the Malaysia 17–0). Ukraine also received the prize "Best Fair-play Award"; the team did not receive any warnings in the tournament.

=== UEFA Women's Futsal Euro 2019 ===
The UEFA Women's Futsal Euro 2019 was held in Portugal. The Ukrainian national team finished in 4th place. The UEFA Women's Futsal Championship was officially held for the first time under the auspices of UEFA. The final stage is held in the format of the "Final Four". The selection took place in two rounds, in which 23 teams took part.

In Gondomar, Ukraine played in the semifinals against the hosts of the tournament. In the first half, Portugal had been leading 1–0. After the break, the Ukrainians won back with Sidorenko finished the quick counterattack 1-1. Later in the second half, the Portugal came back and later scored four more goals, thus defeating Ukraine 5–1.

In the third place match, Ukraine played against Russia. The match ended with a score of 2–2 at the end of regulation. Snizhana Volovenko (18th minute) and Yulia Titova (29) excelled for the Ukrainians, while Dina Danilova (9) and Victoria Lebedeva (15) scored for the Russians. In the penalty shootout, Ukraine lost 2–3.

== Results and fixtures ==
Win Draw Loss Fixture

=== 2023 ===
21 February 2023 Friendly	Slovakia	2–3	Ukraine	Bardejov, Slovakia
--:-- UTC+1	Rybanská 11'; Valová 36'	Report	Khomová 39' (o.g.); Shulga 21'; Tytova 40'

22 February 2023 Friendly	Slovakia	2–6	Ukraine	Bardejov, Slovakia
--:-- UTC+1	Hanková 15'; Rybanská 28'	Report	Shulga 3', 14', 16'; Skibina 24'; Forsyuk 27'; Rybanská 39' (o.g.)

== Competitive record ==
=== FIFA Futsal Women's World Cup ===
FIFA Futsal Women's World Cup record									Qualification record					
Year	Round	Position	Pld	W	D*	L	GF	GA	Pld	W	D*	L	GF	GA
(Philippines) 2025	Did not qualify								3	2	0	1	11	4
2029	To be determined								To be determined					
Total	—	0/1	—	—	—	—	—	—	3	2	0	1	11	4
* Draws include knockout matches decided on penalty kicks.

=== UEFA European Championship ===
UEFA European Championship								Qualification record					
Year	Round	Pld	W	D	L	GF	GA	Pld	W	D	L	GF	GA
(Portugal) 2019	Fourth place	2	0	1	1	3	7	3	2	1	0	15	6
(Portugal) 2022	Third place	2	1	0	1	2	10	3	3	0	0	16	5
(Hungary) 2023	Runners-up	2	1	0	1	3	6	3	2	1	0	11	4
(Croatia) 2027	Did not qualify							3	1	1	1	14	6
Total	3/4	6	2	1	3	8	23	12	8	3	1	56	21

== See also ==
- Futsal in Ukraine
- Ukraine women's national football team
