= Portugal women's national futsal team =

Portugal
- Shirt badge/Association crest
- Nickname(s): Selecção das Quinas
- Association: Federação Portuguesa de Futebol
- Confederation: UEFA (Europe)
- Head coach: Luís Conceição
- Captain: Ana Azevedo
- FIFA code: POR
- FIFA ranking: 3 (8 May 2026)
Home colours	Away colours

Biggest win
- Portugal 17–1 Russia (Rio Maior, Portugal; 24 April 2004)

Biggest defeat
- Portugal 1–9 Spain (Guatemala City, Guatemala; 29 November 2015)

FIFA Futsal Women's World Cup
- Appearances: 1 (First in 2025)
- Best result: Runners-up (2025)

European Championship
- Appearances: 3 (First in 2019)
- Best result: Runners-up (2019, 2022)

The Portugal women's national futsal team represents Portugal in international futsal competitions and is controlled by the Federação Portuguesa de Futebol.

== Tournament records ==
=== FIFA Futsal Women's World Cup ===
FIFA Futsal Women's World Cup record									Qualification record					
Year	Round	Position	Pld	W	D*	L	GF	GA	Pld	W	D*	L	GF	GA
(Philippines) 2025	Final	Runners-up	6	5	0	1	37	7	3	3	0	0	21	1
Total:1/1	Final	Runners-up	6	5	0	1	37	7	3	3	0	0	21	1
* Draws include knockout matches decided on penalty kicks.

=== World Tournament ===
World Tournament Record
Year	Round	Pld	W	D	L	GS	GA
(Spain) 2010	Runners-up	5	3	1	1	14	11
(Brazil) 2011	Third place	5	3	1	1	19	6
(Portugal) 2012	Runners-up	6	4	0	2	20	9
(Spain) 2013	4th place	5	2	0	3	14	10
(Costa Rica) 2014	Runners-up	5	3	0	2	14	10
(Guatemala) 2015	4th place	5	2	1	2	14	19
Total	6/6	31	17	3	11	95	65

=== UEFA European Championship ===
UEFA European Championship								Qualification record					
Year	Round	Pld	W	D	L	GF	GA	Pld	W	D	L	GF	GA
(Portugal) 2019	Runners-up	2	1	0	1	5	5	3	3	0	0	26	1
(Portugal) 2022	Runners-up	2	1	1	0	9	3	3	3	0	0	29	3
(Hungary) 2023	Third place	2	1	0	1	14	2	3	3	0	0	31	1
Total	3/3	6	3	1	2	28	10	9	9	0	0	86	5

== Current squad ==
The following players were called up for the friendly against Poland on 9 and 10 September 2025.

No.	Pos.	Player	Date of birth (age)	Caps	Goals	Club
1	GK	Ana Catarina	19 November 1992 (age 33)	117	1	(Portuguese Football Federation) Benfica
12	GK	Marta Costa	26 October 2000 (age 25)	11	0	(Portuguese Football Federation) L. Porto Salvo
2	DF	Inês Matos	26 October 1999 (age 26)	28	1	(Portuguese Football Federation) Benfica
7	DF	Ana Azevedo	28 July 1986 (age 39)	135	45	(Portuguese Football Federation) Nun'Álvares
6	DF	Kika	9 February 2000 (age 26)	24	8	(Portuguese Football Federation) L. Porto Salvo
9	MF	Fifó	9 August 2000 (age 25)	82	33	(Portuguese Football Federation) Benfica
4	MF	Carolina Pedreira	14 April 2002 (age 24)	30	13	(Royal Spanish Football Federation) Poio Pescamar
5	MF	Carolina Rocha	15 January 2000 (age 26)	39	5	(Portuguese Football Federation) Novasemente
3	MF	Leninha	8 February 2002 (age 24)	31	1	(Royal Spanish Football Federation) Futsi Navalcarnero
13	MF	Raquel Santos	4 April 1998 (age 28)	34	12	(Portuguese Football Federation) Benfica
10	MF	Maria Pereira	16 December 1995 (age 30)	44	12	(Portuguese Football Federation) Benfica
8	FW	Janice Silva	12 June 1997 (age 28)	99	52	(Portuguese Football Federation) Benfica
14	FW	Lídia Moreira	28 March 1995 (age 31)	60	28	(Portuguese Football Federation) Nun'Álvares
11	FW	Dricas	17 October 1998 (age 27)	2	1	(Portuguese Football Federation) L. Porto Salvo

== Friendlies ==
=== 2018 ===
20 February 2018 Friendly	Portugal	3–2	Ukraine	Angra do Heroísmo, Açores, Portugal
				Stadium: Pavilhão Municipal de Desportos de Angra do Heroísmo

2 September 2018 Friendly	Portugal	8–0	Japan	Entroncamento, Portugal
	Carla Vanessa 2' 32'; Taninha 6'; Sara Ferreira 18' 25' 27'; Ana Azevedo 20'; Cátia Morgado 29'	Report		Stadium: Pavilhão Municipal do Entroncamento; Referee: Miguel Castilho

3 September 2018 Friendly	Portugal	4–0	Japan	Entroncamento, Portugal
		Report		Stadium: Pavilhão Municipal do Entroncamento; Referee: Miguel Castilho

5 September 2018 Friendly	Portugal	0–1	Spain	Oliveira de Azeméis, Portugal
		Report		Stadium: Pavilhão Municipal de Oliveira Azeméis; Referee: Eduardo Coelho

6 September 2018 Friendly	Portugal	2–1	Spain	Oliveira de Azeméis, Portugal
		Report		Stadium: Pavilhão Municipal de Oliveira Azeméis; Referee: Eduardo Coelho

23 October 2018 Friendly	Portugal	11–0	Slovenia	Funchal, Madeira, Portugal
				Stadium: Pavilhão do CS Marítimo; Referee: Rúben Guerreiro

24 October 2018 Friendly	Portugal	13–0	Slovenia	Funchal, Madeira, Portugal
				Stadium: Pavilhão do CS Marítimo

7 December 2018 Friendly	Portugal	1–0	Russia	Nazaré, Portugal
				Stadium: Pavilhão Gimnodesportivo da Nazaré

9 December 2018 Friendly	Portugal	4–0	Russia	Nazaré, Portugal
				Stadium: Pavilhão Gimnodesportivo da Nazaré

=== 2019 ===
8 January 2019 Friendly	Spain	4–3	Portugal	Tenerife, Canary Islands, Spain

9 January 2019 Friendly	Spain	1–2	Portugal	Tenerife, Canary Islands, Spain

8 February 2019 Friendly	Portugal	9–0	Hungary	Gondomar, Portugal
				Stadium: Pavilhão Multiusos de Gondomar

9 February 2019 Friendly	Portugal	6–0	Hungary	Gondomar, Portugal
				Stadium: Pavilhão Multiusos de Gondomar

== See also ==
- Futsal in Portugal
- Portugal women's national football team
