= Russia women's national futsal team =

National sports team

Russia
- Shirt badge/Association crest
- Association: Russian Football Union
- Confederation: UEFA (Europe)
- Head coach: Mikhail Kryukov
- Captain: Natalya Patsekina
- Most caps: Alexandra Samorodova (110)
- Top scorer: Tatyana Korzhova (34)
- FIFA code: RUS
- FIFA ranking: 9 (24 September 2026)
| Home colours | Away colours |

First international
- Russia 3–2 Portugal (Elche, Spain; 21 November 1997)

Biggest win
- Russia 15–0 Montenegro (Mór, Hungary, 3 February 2011)

Biggest defeat
- Portugal 17–1 Russia (Rio Maior, Portugal; 24 April 2004)

UEFA Women's Futsal Euro
- Appearances: 1 (First in 2019)
- Best result: Third place (2019)

Women's Futsal World Tournament
- Appearances: 6 (First in 2010)
- Best result: Runner-up (2015)

The Russia women's national futsal team (Russian: Женская национальная сборная России по футзалу, Zhenskaya natsionalnaya sbornaya Rossii po futzalu) is the national futsal team of Russia. The team is controlled by the Russian Football Union and affiliates with UEFA. Because of the 2022 Russian invasion of Ukraine, FIFA and UEFA suspended all Russian teams from competitions, whether national representative teams or clubs.

== History ==
=== 1994—2009 ===
In the 1990s, there was no talk of international women's futsal. As usual, the men's international calendar was built first and there was no time for official competitions of women's teams. Nevertheless, the Russian Women's Futsal Association, which was in charge of the discipline until 2009, tried to organize training camps for the best Russian futsal players. In the summer of 1994, as part of the cultural program of the Goodwill Games in St. Petersburg, a small exhibition tournament was held with the participation of the Russian team, St. Petersburg's Baltika and the Belarusian team Minskanka. The Russian national team, led by the coach of Volgograd's Kontur-Junior Yuri Kukanov, won the tournament, beating the hosts 6:0 (Solovyov, Gurov, Churyumov, Borodin, Morozov, Suslov) and Minsk 2:1 (Borodin-2).

Since the second half of the 90s, there has been active lobbying for the inclusion of futsal (FIFA) in the program of the Summer Olympics. Australia, which was supposed to host the 2000 Games, unexpectedly began to play a significant role in this process. The Australians announced their desire to hold an experimental FIFA Futsal World Championship for women on the eve of their home Olympics. For unknown reasons, these plans were not destined to come true. Nevertheless, with an eye on the future World Cup, the Russian women's mini-football team continued to hold training camps and test games with Russian clubs. In 1995-1997, the Russian national team, led by Nikolai Sevostyanov and Alexander Grebnev, held a number of matches at the Moscow Youth Institute in Vykhino: with Nadezhda from the Moscow region 7:6 (Churyumova-3, Ippolitova-3, Borodina), with Chertanovo from Moscow 5:5 (Shilo-3, Suslova-2) and 6:3 (Shilo-4, Suslova-2), Sport-istok from Fryazino 6:2 (Borodina-2, Suslova-2, Kosolapova, Vitovtova), Orlyonok from the Moscow region 4:4 (Shishkova-2, Didenko, Tereshkina). The following players played for the Russian national team in these matches: goalkeepers - Tatyana Nenasheva (Kontur-Junior), Anna Gnevysheva (Aurora, future FIFA referee), Alevtina Anoshina (Volzhanka Saratov), Olga Belyaeva (Chertanovo), field players - Elena Perekhozheva, Natalia Kharlanova, Elena Churyumova, Pavlina Borodina, Oksana Salova (all - Kontur-Junior), Larisa Solovyova, Ekaterina Shishkova, Maya Khutsishvili, Natalia Titkova (all - Sport-istok), Irina Lagunova, Ekaterina Popova, Anastasia Pustovoitova (future FIFA referee), Olesya Didenko, Evgenia Tereshkina (all - Chertanovo), Elena Chernousova, Victoria Gurevich, Larisa Abushaeva (all - "Volzhanka"), Natalia Voronina, Natalia Pushkina, Svetlana Khvatova (all - "Aurora"), Olga Vitovtova ("Alektan"), Yulia Semina, Nadezhda Ippolitova, Yulia Sysoeva (all - "Nadezhda"), Svetlana Velikanova, Alla Davydcheva (both - "Baltika" St. Petersburg), Elena Gurova, Irina Shilo (both - "Orlyonok"), Elena Suslova ("Vlada" Vladimir), Irina Klimenko ("Gloria" Khimki), Marina Novikova ("Snezhana").

And yet, the trendsetters in European futsal - the Spaniards, little by little, tried to eliminate gender inequality. In the fall of 1997, the Russian Women's Futsal Association received an invitation to the "Tournament of 4" in Elche. The team was planned to be sent under the leadership of the former coach of the capital's Minkas Boris Burlakov, who headed the promising Moscow team Nika. However, due to force majeure circumstances (an expired passport), the experienced coach only held a training camp, during which the Russians beat Diana 9:0 (Churyumova-3, Suslova-2, Mokshanova-2, Didenko, Bikeykina) and Chertanovo 12:1 (Borodina-4, Churyumova-2, Bikeykina-2, Mokshanova-2, Didenko, Suslova). Due to permanent financial problems, the team flew to Elche with only eight people on the roster. One of them, Natalia Shlyapina (Mokshanova), later known for her performances for the football team Rossiyanka, was at a fairly young age at that time, coming onto the court for just a couple of seconds. Tatyana Bikeykina left a noticeable mark both in big football and in futsal.

Even in such a situation, the Russian women created a real sensation in their very first game, beating the Portuguese team with a score of 3:2 (Bikeykina, Suslova, Churyumova). In the next game with the hosts, the Russian team played absolutely on equal terms for three quarters of the match. Only desperately trying to recoup, forgetting about defense, the Russian futsal players missed three goals in a row – 2:6 (Suslova, Didenko). An offensive defeat in the last minutes from the Ukrainians, who at that time had a more well-established system of women's futsal in their country, 2:3 (Bikeykina, Borodina) left the tired, completely brave Russian women in third place.

The match in Elche remained the only meeting of the Ukrainian and Russian national teams for many years. Having received a fair thrashing in the games with the Spanish and Portuguese, the Ukrainian national team preferred to avoid such tournaments. But the Russian national team, despite its meager financial resources, continued to find options for meetings with the giants. Having warmed up at the Moscow region "Nadezhda" 15:1 from Krasnoarmeysk (Borodina-4, Bikeikina-3, Fedchenko-2, Ivanitskaya-2, Churyumova-2, Didenko, Mikhailova), Yuri Kukanov's team in December 1998, having flown to the Spanish Segovia, once again surprised the local public. Alas, after a heroic draw with the hosts 3:3 (Borodina, Churyumova, Mikhailova), the traditionally "truncated" away team of Russians lost to the Portuguese 0:4. Missing a third team, the hosts gave Russia the opportunity to play the local team on the last day. Surely, they regretted it, since the Russian team sent twelve unanswered goals into the opponents' net (Fedchenko-3, Ivanitskaya-2, Bikeikina-2, Didenko-2, Borodina, Churyumova, Mikhailova). In this convocation, goalkeeper Svetlana Kerzhkovskaya, field players Galina Fedchenko, Anna Mikhailova (all from "Aurora"), Tatyana Ivanitskaya ("Rokada") joined the Russian team.

It was time for the Russians to host their opponents. The national teams of Portugal, Ukraine and Australia refused to fly to Moscow, conveniently citing financial problems. The situation was saved in February 1999 by Minsk Edel, which entered as the youth team of Belarus. The playing resources of the Association of Women's Futsal at that time were sufficient to field a second, youth team at the home tournament. The Russian team at the tournament in the capital's complex of the State University of Management consistently beat its youth team 6:1 (Fedchenko-3, Churyumova, Voronina, Borodina), their Belarusian peers 15:0 (Ivanitskaya, Fedchenko - 3 each, Bikeikina, A. Pakshtaitis, Borodina - 2 each, Churyumova, Suslova, Voronina). The decisive match of absolutely equal opponents - the Russians and the Spanish ended in a fighting draw 1:1. After Pavlina Borodina's goal, the Spanish managed to quickly even the score and become the winners with a better goal difference. At this tournament, the most experienced captain of "Aurora" Natalia Voronina and one of the Pakstaitis sisters - Alla ("Vlada") made their debut for the first Russian team.

In the spring of 2000, the team of Yuri Kukanov made another heroic throw to the Pyrenees. Due to the lack of normal financing, the Russian team played in almost its optimal composition only once - on its home court in Moscow. In Nazaré (Portugal), the Russians, having held out for the entire first half, lost to the Spanish team 2:5 (Churyumova, Borodina) and the Portuguese 1:3 (Khvatova). The last was the traditional victory over the hosts' youth team 5:4 (Borodina-2, Ivanitskaya, Khvatova, Fedchenko).

A bunch of organizational problems, inattention to the development of women's futsal in the country until the end of the 2000s led to the leading clubs, first of all - Volgograd's "Rokada" (former names - "Kontur-Junior", "Lokomotiv") and St. Petersburg's "Aurora" came under the auspices of the Futsal Federation of Russia. The only attempt after that in the spring of 2004 to send a highly experimental team to Portugal turned into a complete fiasco - 1:17 from Portugal and 1:16 from Spain.

=== 2010—present ===
In October 2009, the Russian women's national team came under the control of the Russian Football Union, as a result of which it was able to officially participate in tournaments under the auspices of FIFA and UEFA. This time is considered the official creation of the national team. The team was headed by experienced specialist Evgeny Kuzmin. The coach's debut was in a friendly match against Chertanovo, in which the Russians won with a score of 4:3.

Since then, the Russian women's national team has become a participant in all major international competitions. The Russian team has played in six unofficial World Cups and nine times became the host of the International Victory Day Tournament in Moscow.

A resounding success accompanied the Russian women in December 2016. Having received an invitation to the 1st International Four Nations Tournament in Spain, the Russian team beat the teams of Spain, Portugal and Italy, winning gold medals.

As part of the first-ever official European Women's Futsal Championship, the Russian national team successfully overcame the qualification barrier and reached the Final Four. Having lost to Spain in the semi-finals, the Russian women were stronger than the Ukrainian national team in the match for 3rd place, winning the bronze medals of the historic EURO 19.

On December 31, 2022, Evgeniy Kuzmin's contract with the Russian Football Union expired. Mikhail Kryukov was appointed the new head coach of the national team. In the coach's debut friendly match, the national women's team of Serbia was defeated with a score of 5:2.

In March 2023, the Russian national team, under the leadership of the new coach, took part in the 1st International Women's Games "Navruz" in Iran, where they became the winner.

== Competitive record ==
=== FIFA Futsal Women's World Cup ===
FIFA Futsal Women's World Cup record
| Year | Round | Position | GP | W | D | L | GS | GA |
|---|---|---|---|---|---|---|---|---|
| (Philippines) 2025 | Suspended | | | | | | | |
| Total | – | 0/1 | 0 | 0 | 0 | 0 | 0 | 0 |

=== Women's Futsal World Tournament ===
| Year | Tournament round | Matches | Wins | Draws | Losses | Goals scored | Missed |
|---|---|---|---|---|---|---|---|
| (Spain) 2010 | Third place | 4 | 2 | 0 | 2 | 4 | 8 |
| (Brazil) 2011 | Fourth place | 5 | 2 | 0 | 3 | 6 | 14 |
| (Portugal) 2012 | Fourth place | 6 | 3 | 0 | 3 | 18 | 7 |
| (Spain) 2013 | Third place | 6 | 3 | 2 | 1 | 25 | 10 |
| (Costa Rica) 2014 | Seventh place | 3 | 0 | 0 | 3 | 3 | 10 |
| (Guatemala) 2015 | Runner-up | 5 | 3 | 1 | 1 | 13 | 5 |
| Total | 6/6 | 29 | 13 | 3 | 13 | 69 | 54 |

=== UEFA Women's Futsal Euro ===
| Year | Tournament round | Matches | Wins | Draws | Losses | Goals scored | Missed |
|---|---|---|---|---|---|---|---|
| (Portugal) 2019 | Third place | 2 | 1 | 0 | 1 | 2 | 5 |
| (Portugal) 2022 | Disqualified/Suspended due to Russian invasion of Ukraine | | | | | | |
| (Hungary) 2023 | Disqualified/Suspended due to Russian invasion of Ukraine | | | | | | |
| (Croatia) 2027 | Disqualified/Suspended due to Russian invasion of Ukraine | | | | | | |
| Total | 1/4 | 2 | 1 | 0 | 1 | 2 | 5 |

=== Other international tournaments ===
| Year | Tournament | Tournament Round | Matches | Wins | Draws | Losses | Goals Scored | Missed |
|---|---|---|---|---|---|---|---|---|
| (Russia) 2010 | International women's futsal tournament May 9 | Runner-up | 3 | 2 | 0 | 1 | 8 | 4 |
| (Russia) 2011 | International women's futsal tournament May 9 | Runner-up | 3 | 1 | 2 | 0 | 5 | 3 |
| (Russia) 2012 | International women's futsal tournament May 9 | Runner-up | 3 | 2 | 0 | 1 | 8 | 4 |
| (Russia) 2013 | International women's futsal tournament May 9 | Champions | 3 | 0 | 0 | 0 | 13 | 1 |
| (Russia) 2014 | International women's futsal tournament May 9 | Runner-up | 3 | 2 | 0 | 1 | 5 | 4 |
| (Russia) 2015 | International women's futsal tournament May 9 | Runner-up | 3 | 2 | 0 | 1 | 5 | 4 |
| (Russia) 2016 | International women's futsal tournament May 9 | Runner-up | 3 | 2 | 0 | 1 | 15 | 7 |
| (Spain) 2016 | International women's futsal Four-Nations Series | Champions | 3 | 3 | 0 | 0 | 8 | 4 |
| (Russia) 2017 | International women's futsal tournament May 9 | Runner-up | 3 | 2 | 0 | 1 | 16 | 4 |
| (Spain) 2017 | International women's futsal Four-Nations Series | Runner-up | 3 | 1 | 1 | 1 | 6 | 3 |
| (Russia) 2018 | International women's futsal tournament May 9 | Runner-up | 3 | 2 | 0 | 1 | 6 | 3 |
| (Russia) 2019 | International women's futsal tournament May 9 | Third place | 3 | 1 | 0 | 2 | 3 | 3 |
| (Iran) 2023 | International women's futsal tournament Navruz | Champions | 2 | 2 | 0 | 0 | 7 | 1 |
| Total | | 13/13 | 35 | 22 | 3 | 10 | 105 | 45 |

== Coaching staff ==
| Position | Name |
|---|---|
| Head Coach | (Russia) Mikhail Kryukov |
| Coach | (Russia) Sergey Abramov |
| Manager | (Russia) Andrey Tkachuk |
| Administrator | (Russia) Alexey Fomin |
| Doctor | (Russia) Vladimir Voronin |
| Masseur | (Russia) Viktor Sergeev |
| Videographer | (Russia) Artem Fedorin |

== Current squad ==
| № | Player | Date of birth | Club | Match (goals) | National team debut |
Goalkeeper
| 13 | Anastasia Ivanova (c) | 2 October 1994 (age 32) | Kristall | 57 (0) | vs Hungary, 7 May 2012. |
| 12 | Aleksandra Kolesova | 1 July 2000 (age 26) | Normanochka | 4 (0) | vs Slovakia, 7 September 2017. |
| 1 | Daria Katysheva | 8 September 2003 (age 23) | Laguna UOR | 2 (0) | vs Uzbekistan, 22 May 2023. |
Fixo
| 18 | Oksana Alemaikina | 27 October 1995 (age 31) | Kristall | 40 (11) | vs Hungary, 5 February 2013. |
| 10 | Ekaterina Enina | 17 August 2001 (age 25) | Laguna UOR | 11 (4) | vs Hungary, 26 April 2019. |
| 22 | Kristina Khavich | 28 September 2000 (age 26) | MosPolytech | 3 (1) | vs Serbia, 13 January 2023. |
| 2 | Valeria Khlebosolova | 13 June 2000 (age 26) | Kristall | 8 (2) | vs (Czech Republic) Czechia, 18 February 2017. |
Ala
| 3 | Evgeniya Kovalenko | 19 March 2001 (age 25) | Kristall | 2 (1) | vs Uzbekistan, 22 May 2023. |
| 5 | Anastasia Durandina | 4 September 1996 (age 30) | Kristall | 69 (16) | vs Hungary, 5 February 2013. |
| 8 | Natalia Patsekina | 12 January 1998 (age 28) | Oryol State University | 11 (1) | vs Iran, 15 October 2016. |
| 7 | Elizaveta Nikitina | 18 September 1997 (age 29) | Kristall | 64 (14) | vs Iran, 18 November 2013. |
| 11 | Ekaterina Samoilova | 29 May 2001 (age 25) | Normanochka | 13 (3) | vs Slovakia, 7 September 2017. |
Pivot
| 9 | Maria Samoilova | 29 May 2001 (age 25) | Normanochka | 24 (17) | vs Slovakia, 7 September 2017. |
| 17 | Sofia Sintsova | 30 August 2005 (age 21) | Kristall | 4 (3) | vs Serbia, 13 January 2023. |

== Results and fixtures ==
Win Draw Loss Void or Postponed Fixture

=== 2022 ===
| 21 February 2022 Friendly | Iran | 1–5 | Russia | Tehran, Iran |

| 23 February 2022 Friendly | Iran | 0–1 | Russia | Tehran, Iran |

| 8 October 2022 Friendly | Russia | 5–5 | (Russia) MosPolytech | Krasnogorsk, Russia |

=== 2023 ===
| 13 January 2023 Friendly | Serbia | 2–5 | Russia | Stara Pazova, Serbia |

| 14 January 2023 Friendly | Serbia | 1–5 | Russia | Stara Pazova, Serbia |

| 20 February 2023 Friendly | Russia | 5–2 | (Russia) MosPolytech | Krasnogorsk, Russia |

| 11 March 2023 Friendly | Iran | 1–3 | Russia | Tehran, Iran |

| 13 March 2023 Friendly | Iran | 0–4 | Russia | Tehran, Iran |

| 22 May 2023 Friendly | Uzbekistan | 1–4 | Russia | Tashkent, Uzbekistan |

| 23 May 2023 Friendly | Uzbekistan | 0–7 | Russia | Tashkent, Uzbekistan |

=== 2024 ===
| 8 November Friendly | Vietnam | 0–6 | Russia | Ho Chi Minh City, Vietnam |
| 16:00 UTC+7 | | Report | Khavich 5', 17'; Sintsova 7'; Navozova 16'; Samoilova 30'; ? 30' | Stadium: Thái Sơn Nam District 8 Stadium |

| 10 November Friendly | Vietnam | 1–6 | Russia | Ho Chi Minh City, Vietnam |
| 16:00 UTC+7 | | Report | | Stadium: Thái Sơn Nam District 8 Stadium |

| 14 December Friendly | Kyrgyzstan | 0–13 | Russia | Bishkek, Kyrgyzstan |
| 16:00 UTC+6 | | | | Stadium: Kozhomkul Sport Palace |

| 15 December Friendly | Kyrgyzstan | 0–12 | Russia | Bishkek, Kyrgyzstan |
| 16:00 UTC+6 | | | | Stadium: Kozhomkul Sport Palace |

=== 2026 ===
| 13 October Friendly | Indonesia | v | Russia | Central Java, Indonesia |
| --:-- UTC+7 |

| 15 October Friendly | Indonesia | v | Russia | Central Java, Indonesia |
| --:-- UTC+7 |

| 19 November Friendly | Vietnam | v | Russia | Vietnam |
| --:-- UTC+7 |

| 21 November Friendly | Vietnam | v | Russia | Vietnam |
| --:-- UTC+7 |
