= UEFA Women's Futsal Euro 2027 =

Tournament details
- Host country: Preliminary round: Group A: Norway; Group B: Lithuania; Group C: Slovenia; Main round: Group A: Portugal; Group B: Slovakia; Group C: Slovenia; Group D: Poland; Final tournament: Osijek, Croatia
- Dates: Preliminary round: 18–21 March 2026; Main round: 7–11 October 2026; Final tournament: March 2027
- Teams: Final tournament: 8 Qualifying: 23 (from 1 confederation)
- Venue: Final tournament: 1 (in 1 host city)

Tournament statistics
- Matches played: 24
- Goals scored: 129 (5.38 per match)
- Top scorer(s): 4 players (5 goals each)
- All statistics correct as of 7 October 2026.

The 2027 UEFA Women's Futsal Championship, also referred to as UEFA Women's Futsal Euro 2027, is the upcoming fourth edition of the UEFA Women's Futsal Championship, the quadrennial international futsal championship organised by UEFA for the women's national teams of Europe. The tournament will be played in Croatia from 14 to 21 March 2027. This edition will mark the first expansion of the tournament to eight teams, four more than in the previous edition, and the first to adopt a quadrennial cycle after being held biennially for its first three editions.

Spain are the three-time defending champions, having won all previous editions of the tournament.

== Host selection and Venues ==
On 11 September 2025, Croatia was awarded the hosting rights for the competition following a decision by the UEFA Executive Committee.

=== Selected venues ===
All matches are scheduled to be played in Osijek

Osijek	UEFA Women's Futsal Euro 2027 is located in Croatia
Arena Gradski Vrt. Capacity: 3,538	UEFA Women's Futsal Euro 2027 is located in Croatia

== Qualification ==
All 55 UEFA national teams were eligible to enter the competition. However, a total of 23 teams entered the qualifying competition. Russia was not permitted to enter the competition, as Russian teams had been suspended indefinitely from UEFA and FIFA competitions in 28 February 2022 due to their country's invasion of Ukraine.

The 12 lowest-ranked associations entered the main round, while the remaining 11 associations advanced directly to the elite round. The coefficient ranking was used for seeding in the draw, where each team was assigned a seeding position according to their ranking.

Final tournament hosts
Team
Croatia

Participating teams for UEFA Women's Futsal Euro 2027 qualifying

Teams entering elite round
Team	Coeff.	Rank
Spain	24.750	1
Portugal	23.278	2
Ukraine	13.067	3
Hungary	12.166	4
Italy	9.767	5
Poland	8.208	6
Finland	7.000	7
Sweden	6.333	8
Netherlands	5.500	9
Slovakia	4.917	10
Belgium	4.542	11

Teams entering main round
Team	Coeff.	Rank
Slovenia	4.333	12
Bosnia and Herzegovina	3.833	13
Czech Republic	3.833	14
Belarus	3.333	15
Serbia	2.667	16
France	2.417	17
Northern Ireland	1.667	18
Norway	1.667	19
England	1.333	20
Lithuania	1.167	21
Kazakhstan	1.167	22
Latvia	1.000	23

Did not enter Team Armenia Gibraltar Moldova Romania	Banned Team Russia

== Main round ==
The winners of each group and the best 2 ranked runners-up advance to the final tournament.

Times are CEST (UTC+2), as listed by UEFA (local times, if different, are in parentheses).

=== Group A ===
Pos	Team	Pld	W	D	L	GF	GA	GD	Pts	Qualification
1	Norway (H)	3	3	0	0	13	0	+13	9	Elite Round
2	Czech Republic	3	2	0	1	12	6	+6	6	Elite Round
3	Belarus	3	1	0	2	6	8	−2	3	
4	Kazakhstan	3	0	0	3	3	20	−17	0	

Source: UEFA
Rules for classification: Tiebreakers
(H) Hosts
18 March 2026
15:00

Czech Republic	7–2	Kazakhstan
Cardova 10'45", 21'19"; Hlaváčová 17'03", 20'12", 20'57"; Soquessa 26'48"; Plháková 34'03"	Report	Aubakir 37'15" (pen.); Karazhanova 39'00"

Kolstad Arena, Trondheim
Referee: Fatma Özlem Tursun (Turkey), Sara Gutiérrez Echeverría (Spain)
18 March 2026
18:30

Belarus	0–2	Norway
	Report	Meyer 13'53"; Sandtrøen 16'51"

Kolstad Arena, Trondheim
Referee: Marijana Orešić (Croatia), Jasmina Mickoska (Serbia)

19 March 2026
15:00

Belarus	2–5	Czech Republic
Zubko 11'35" (pen.); Natsiatkova 14'39"	Report	Kretschmann 0'16", 22'53"; Beštová 22'40"; Komárková 23'51"; Asmykovich 26'15" (o.g.)

Kolstad Arena, Trondheim
Referee: Jasmina Mickoska (Serbia), Fatma Özlem Tursun (Turkey)
19 March 2026
18:30

Norway	9–0	Kazakhstan
Vågen 6'55", 7'21"; Kanestrøm 8'16"; Borgen 9'50", 31'16"; Aune 10'14", 14'41", 19'42"; Halgunset 14'18"	Report

Kolstad Arena, Trondheim
Referee: Sara Gutiérrez Echeverría (Spain), Marijana Orešić (Croatia)

21 March 2026
15:00

Kazakhstan	1–4	Belarus
Stupina 11'39"	Report	Kharitonchik 2'18"; Pelyovina 5'22", 11'09", 20'35"

Kolstad Arena, Trondheim
Referee: Fatma Özlem Tursun (Turkey), Marijana Orešić (Croatia)
21 March 2026
18:30

Norway	2–0	Czech Republic
Meyer 2'47"; Kristiansen 15'45"	Report

Kolstad Arena, Trondheim
Referee: Jasmina Mickoska (Serbia), Sara Gutiérrez Echeverría (Spain)

=== Group B ===
Pos	Team	Pld	W	D	L	GF	GA	GD	Pts	Qualification
1	Bosnia and Herzegovina	3	2	1	0	6	3	+3	7	Elite Round
2	England	3	1	2	0	5	1	+4	5	
3	Serbia	3	1	1	1	6	2	+4	4	
4	Lithuania (H)	3	0	0	3	1	12	−11	0	

Source: UEFA
Rules for classification: Tiebreakers
(H) Hosts
18 March 2026
15:00

Bosnia and Herzegovina	1–1	England
Vujadin 37'34"	Report	Kural 14'46"

Birštonas Sports Center, Birštonas
Referee: Monika Czudzinowicz (Poland), Filipa Prata (Portugal)
18 March 2026
18:00

Serbia	5–0	Lithuania
Trbojević 10'09", 16'58"; Radulović 16'08"; Vulikić 17'47"; Izgarević 30'03"	Report

Birštonas Sports Center, Birštonas
Referee: Larisa Avramidou (Cyprus), Emanuele Karbala (Switzerland)

19 March 2026
15:00

Serbia	1–2	Bosnia and Herzegovina
M. Maksimović 1'34"	Report	Milović 19'55"; Ćesko 34'27"

Birštonas Sports Center, Birštonas
Referee: Emanuele Karbala (Switzerland), Monika Czudzinowicz (Poland)
19 March 2026
18:00

Lithuania	0–4	England
	Report	Walklett 15'45"; Kural 28'29", 34'57" (pen.); Harvey 39'40"

Birštonas Sports Center, Birštonas
Referee: Filipa Prata (Portugal), Larisa Avramidou (Cyprus)

21 March 2026
13:00

England	0–0	Serbia
	Report

Birštonas Sports Center, Birštonas
Referee: Filipa Prata (Portugal), Larisa Avramidou (Cyprus)
21 March 2026
16:00

Lithuania	1–3	Bosnia and Herzegovina
Šablevičiūtė 12'22"	Report	Vujadin 10'58", 31'49"; Mujanović 37'14"

Birštonas Sports Center, Birštonas
Referee: Monika Czudzinowicz (Poland), Emanuele Karbala (Switzerland)

=== Group C ===
Pos	Team	Pld	W	D	L	GF	GA	GD	Pts	Qualification
1	France	3	3	0	0	26	1	+25	9	Elite Round
2	Slovenia (H)	3	2	0	1	14	7	+7	6	Elite Round
3	Latvia	3	1	0	2	4	17	−13	3	
4	Northern Ireland	3	0	0	3	3	22	−19	0	

Source: UEFA
Rules for classification: Tiebreakers
(H) Hosts
18 March 2026
17:30

Northern Ireland	1–7	Slovenia
Dempster 14'17"	Report	Ines 5'52"; McQuarrie 10'41", 10'59", 30'17", 38'12"; Mele 14'00"; Ložar 18'13"

Sport Hall Podčetrtek, Podčetrtek
Referee: Martina Piccolo (Italy), Florentina Kallaba (Kosovo)
18 March 2026
20:15

France	9–0	Latvia
Atamaniuk 1'14", 9'10"; Boissinot 18'37"; Alberbide 20'19"; Pellegry 22'37", 29'56"; Commaret 32'13"; Delorme 33'39"; Osiņina 34'15" (o.g.)	Report

Sport Hall Podčetrtek, Podčetrtek
Referee: Alice Vévodová (Czech Republic), Roosa-Maria Tuomi (Finland)

19 March 2026
16:00

Northern Ireland	0–12	France
	Report	Kelly 2'29" (o.g.); Delorme 7'48"; Wioland 8'33"; Jouan 9'14", 36'29", 36'54"; Alberbide 9'33", 35'47"; Commaret 12'27"; Pellegry 15'17", 35'00"; Atamaniuk 16'28"

Sport Hall Podčetrtek, Podčetrtek
Referee: Roosa-Maria Tuomi (Finland), Martina Piccolo (Italy)
19 March 2026
18:45

Slovenia	6–1	Latvia
Ines 19'48", 23'54", 25'32"; McQuarrie 30'35"; Žvokelj 30'50"; Dodič 37'06"	Report	Stolipina 27'03"

Sport Hall Podčetrtek, Podčetrtek
Referee: Florentina Kallaba (Kosovo), Alice Vévodová (Czech Republic)

21 March 2026
15:00

Latvia	3–2	Northern Ireland
Brazauska 20'10"; Paidere 37'59", 39'52"	Report	McMaster 4'37"; Dempster 16'10" (pen.)

Sport Hall Podčetrtek, Podčetrtek
Referee: Alice Vévodová (Czech Republic), Roosa-Maria Tuomi (Finland)
21 March 2026
17:45

Slovenia	1–5	France
Žvokelj 16'46"	Report	Alberbide 4'52, 25'14"; Atamaniuk 6'57"; Bitterlin 36'44"; Papin 37'41"

Sport Hall Podčetrtek, Podčetrtek
Referee: Martina Piccolo (Italy), Florentina Kallaba (Kosovo)

=== Ranking of second-placed teams ===
Pos	Grp	Team	Pld	W	D	L	GF	GA	GD	Pts	Qualification
1	C	Slovenia	3	2	0	1	14	7	+7	6	Qualified for the Elite Round
2	A	Czech Republic	3	2	0	1	12	6	+6	6	Qualified for the Elite Round
3	B	England	3	1	2	0	5	1	+4	5	

Source: UEFA
Rules for classification: 1) points; 2) goal difference; 3) goals scored; 4) disciplinary points; 5) coefficient ranking.

== Elite Round ==
The group winners and 2 best runners-up advance to the final tournament. The remaining runners-up will compete in a two-nation play-off in November 2026.

=== Group 1 ===
Pos	Team	Pld	W	D	L	GF	GA	GD	Pts	Qualification
1	Portugal (H)	3	3	0	0	10	0	+10	9	Final Tournament
2	Finland	3	2	0	1	4	3	+1	6	Two-nation play-off
3	Netherlands	3	1	0	2	5	6	−1	3	
4	Czech Republic	3	0	0	3	1	11	−10	0	

Source: UEFA
Rules for classification: Tiebreakers
(H) Hosts
8 October 2026
15:00

Finland	1–0	Czech Republic
Lehtonen 36'57"	Report

Pavihão Dr. Salvador Machado, Oliveira de Azeméis
Attendance: 32
Referee: Chiara Perona (Italy), Monika Czudzinowicz (Poland)
8 October 2026
19:00

Netherlands	0–2	Portugal
	Report	Matos 19'28"; M. Pereira 34'48"

Pavihão Dr. Salvador Machado, Oliveira de Azeméis
Attendance: 428
Referee: Larisa Avramidou (Cyprus), Emilie Aubry (Switzerland)

9 October 2026
14:00

Netherlands	0–3	Finland
	Report	Lehtonen 6'24", 11'31"; Jokisalo 10'59"

Pavihão Dr. Salvador Machado, Oliveira de Azeméis
Attendance: 65
Referee: Emilie Aubry (Switzerland), Chiara Perona (Italy)
9 October 2026
18:00

Portugal	5–0	Czech Republic
Silva 11'02"; M. Pereira 15'44"; Oliveira 24'44"; Fifó 38'00", 38'43"	Report

Pavihão Dr. Salvador Machado, Oliveira de Azeméis
Attendance: 514
Referee: Monika Czudzinowicz (Poland), Larisa Avramidou (Cyprus)

11 October 2026
16:00

Czech Republic	1–5	Netherlands
Mesker 24'57" (og)	Report	Kortlever 04'00", 19'31"; Dijkstra 27'05"; Hrtánková 29'23" (og); Mesker 33'24"

Pavihão Dr. Salvador Machado, Oliveira de Azeméis
Attendance: 94
Referee: Monika Czudzinowicz (Poland), Emilie Aubry (Switzerland)
11 October 2026
20:00

Portugal	3–0	Finland
Oliveira 8'40"; Marques 14'53"; A. Pereira 39'39"	Report

Pavihão Dr. Salvador Machado, Oliveira de Azeméis
Attendance: 1,430
Referee: Chiara Perona (Italy), Larisa Avramidou (Cyprus)

=== Group 2 ===
Pos	Team	Pld	W	D	L	GF	GA	GD	Pts	Qualification
1	Hungary	3	3	0	0	7	2	+5	9	Final Tournament
2	Sweden	3	2	0	1	11	5	+6	6	Final Tournament
3	Slovakia (H)	3	1	0	2	7	11	−4	3	
4	Bosnia and Herzegovina	3	0	0	3	3	10	−7	0	

Source: UEFA
Rules for classification: Tiebreakers
(H) Hosts
7 October 2026
16:00

Hungary	2–0	Bosnia and Herzegovina
C. Krascsenics 12'38"; Wiesner 24'50"	Report

Sport Hall Humenné, Humenné
Attendance: 40
Referee: Fatma Özlem Tursun (Turkey), Done Ristovski (North Macedonia)
7 October 2026
19:00

Sweden	7–1	Slovakia
Lindqvist 11'35"; Österberg 19'02"; Glans 23'35"; Lundström 24'56"; Pettersson 28'53", 33'38", 36'34"	Report	Rybanská 7'51"

Sport Hall Humenné, Humenné
Attendance: 150
Referee: Nina Nakić (Croatia), Filipa Prata (Portugal)

8 October 2026
16:00

Sweden	1–3	Hungary
Kiryo 6'56"	Report	Kota 3'36"; Szabó 17'46"; Gajzágó 15'18"

Sport Hall Humenné, Humenné
Attendance: 60
Referee: Filipa Prata (Portugal), Fatma Özlem Tursun (Turkey)
8 October 2026
19:00

Slovakia	5–2	Bosnia and Herzegovina
Kucharčíková 16'00"; Tyčiaková 19'14", 20'57", 29'15"; Rybanská 27'42"	Report	Kucharčíková 2'38" (og); Oštraković 35'33"

Sport Hall Humenné, Humenné
Attendance: 120
Referee: Done Ristovski (North Macedonia), Nina Nakić (Croatia)

10 October 2026
14:00

Bosnia and Herzegovina	1–3	Sweden
Vujadin 2'22"	Report	Rolin 11'52"; Elia 22'33"; Fors 25'09"

Sport Hall Humenné, Humenné
Attendance: 100
Referee: Fatma Özlem Tursun (Turkey), Nina Nakić (Croatia)
10 October 2026
17:00

Slovakia	1–2	Hungary
Tyčiaková 14'34"	Report	Kota 20'06", 30'03"

Sport Hall Humenné, Humenné
Attendance: 350
Referee: Filipa Prata (Portugal), Done Ristovski (North Macedonia)

=== Group 3 ===
Pos	Team	Pld	W	D	L	GF	GA	GD	Pts	Qualification
1	Spain	3	3	0	0	16	3	+13	9	Final Tournament
2	Italy	3	2	0	1	8	2	+6	6	Final Tournament
3	France	3	1	0	2	7	10	−3	3	
4	Slovenia (H)	3	0	0	3	1	17	−16	0	

Source: UEFA
Rules for classification: Tiebreakers
(H) Hosts
7 October 2026
16:30

Spain	5–2	France
I. Córdoba 10'29", 37'11"; Sanz 19'57"; El. González 22'08"; Ev. González 33'51"	Report	Pellegry 0'58"; Boissinot 38'39"

Tri Lilije Hall, Laško
Attendance: 80
Referee: Mariia Myslovska (Ukraine), Andrea Naudi (Malta)
7 October 2026
19:00

Italy	3–0	Slovenia
Boutimah 16'54"; Adamatti 21'51"; Dal Maz 24'16"	Report

Tri Lilije Hall, Laško
Attendance: 150
Referee: Ena Dulić (Bosnia and Herzegovina), Roosa-Maria Tuomi (Finland)

8 October 2026
16:30

Italy	1–2	Spain
Sestari 18'26"	Report	I. Córdoba 1'03"; Sotelo 23'49"

Tri Lilije Hall, Laško
Attendance: 100
Referee: Roosa-Maria Tuomi (Finland), Mariia Myslovska (Ukraine)
8 October 2026
19:00

Slovenia	1–5	France
Lacoste 18'39" (og)	Report	Novak 10'18" (og); Atamaniuk 18'25"; Pellegry 32'56"; Delorme 38'25"; Commaret 38'52"

Tri Lilije Hall, Laško
Attendance: 150
Referee: Andrea Naudi (Malta), Ena Dulić (Bosnia and Herzegovina)

10 October 2026
15:00

France	0–4	Italy
	Report	Bettioli 1'14"; Boutimah 15'40"; Adamatti 19'03", 22'56"

Tri Lilije Hall, Laško
Attendance: 80
Referee: Mariia Myslovska (Ukraine), Ena Dulić (Bosnia and Herzegovina)
10 October 2026
17:30

Slovenia	0–9	Spain
	Report	Samper 2'53", 28'25"; López Quesada 5'44", 21'27"; Ev. González 19'50", 24'00"; Mateo 33'31"; Sanz 35'39"; Martita 39'55"

Tri Lilije Hall, Laško
Attendance: 154
Referee: Roosa-Maria Tuomi (Finland), Andrea Naudi (Malta)

=== Group 4 ===
Pos	Team	Pld	W	D	L	GF	GA	GD	Pts	Qualification
1	Poland (H)	3	2	1	0	13	3	+10	7	Final Tournament
2	Norway	3	2	0	1	4	5	−1	6	Two-nation play-off
3	Ukraine	3	1	1	1	14	6	+8	4	
4	Belgium	3	0	0	3	2	19	−17	0	

Source: UEFA
Rules for classification: Tiebreakers
(H) Hosts
7 October 2026
16:00

Ukraine	1–2	Norway
Shulha 39'21" (pen.)	Report	Aune 31'02", 34'46"

Centrum Sportu Rekord, Bielsko-Biała
Attendance: 153
Referee: Martina Piccolo (Italy), Florentina Kallaba (Kosovo)
7 October 2026
18:30

Belgium	0–7	Poland
	Report	Fal 1'07"; Bała 6'40"; Szostak 10'13", 27'13"; Basta 11'09"; Dymińska 19'16"; Włodarczyk 29'53"

Centrum Sportu Rekord, Bielsko-Biała
Attendance: 384
Referee: Sara Gutiérrez (Spain), Rita Ferraz (Portugal)

8 October 2026
16:00

Belgium	1–10	Ukraine
Drumont 22'03"	Report	S. Kovshyk 1'02", 4'41"; D. Kovshyk 9'07"; Skybina 13'37", 26'26", 37'15"; Tiesters 23'46" (og); Shulha 24'28", 34'19"; Burlachenko 32'02"

Centrum Sportu Rekord, Bielsko-Biała
Attendance: 110
Referee: Rita Ferraz (Portugal), Sara Gutiérrez (Spain)
8 October 2026
18:30

Poland	3–0	Norway
Matuszewska 10'35"; Dymińska 17'35"; Włodarczyk 34'55"	Report

Centrum Sportu Rekord, Bielsko-Biała
Attendance: 584
Referee: Florentina Kallaba (Kosovo), Martina Piccolo (Italy)

10 October 2026
13:30

Norway	2–1	Belgium
Aune 32'11"; Johansen 34'26"	Report	Corbeels 11'26"

Centrum Sportu Rekord, Bielsko-Biała
Attendance: 156
Referee: Rita Ferraz (Portugal), Florentina Kallaba (Kosovo)
10 October 2026
16:00

Poland	3–3	Ukraine
Tracz 13'56"; Fal 33'23", 33'55"	Report	Shulha 1'20", 17'46" (p); Skybina 26'58"

Centrum Sportu Rekord, Bielsko-Biała
Attendance: 568
Referee: Martina Piccolo (Italy), Sara Gutiérrez (Spain)

=== Ranking of second-placed teams ===
Pos	Grp	Team	Pld	W	D	L	GF	GA	GD	Pts	Qualification
1	2	Sweden	3	2	0	1	11	5	+6	6	Qualified for the Final Tournament
2	3	Italy	3	2	0	1	8	2	+6	6	Qualified for the Final Tournament
3	1	Finland	3	2	0	1	4	3	+1	6	Qualified for the two-nation play-off
4	4	Norway	3	2	0	1	4	5	−1	6	Qualified for the two-nation play-off

Source: UEFA
Rules for classification: 1) points; 2) goal difference; 3) goals scored; 4) disciplinary points; 5) coefficient ranking.

=== Two-nation play-off ===
The winner after two matches will advance to the final tournament.

Play-off
Team 1	Agg.	Team 2	1st leg	2nd leg
Norway		Finland	1–3	

20 November 2026
18:00

Norway	1–3	Finland
Dahle 34'03"	Report	Jokisalo 2'16", 9'14"; Enwena 11'16"

Utleirahallen, Trondheim
Attendance: 633
Referee: Martina Piccolo (Italy), Rita Santos Ferraz (Portugal)

24 November 2026
17:30

Finland	v	Norway
	Report

AGCO Power Arena, Nokia

== Final Tournament ==
=== Qualified teams ===
The following teams qualified for the final tournament.

Team	Method of qualification	Date of qualification	Previous appearances in final tournament^{1}
Croatia	Hosts	13 September 2025	Debut
Spain	Main round Group 3 winners	8 October 2026	3 (**2019**, **2022**, **2023**)
Hungary	Main round Group 2 winners	10 October 2026	2 (2022, 2023)
Poland	Main round Group 4 winners	10 October 2026	Debut
Sweden	Main round Group 2 runner-up	10 October 2026	Debut
Portugal	Main round Group 1 winners	11 October 2026	3 (2019, 2022, 2023)
Italy	Main round Group 1 runner-up	11 October 2026	Debut
	Two nation play-off winner	24 November 2026	Debut

^{1} Bold indicates champions for that year. Italic indicates hosts for that year.

=== Group stage ===
The group winners and runners-up advance to the semi-finals.

==== Group A ====
Pos	Team	Pld	W	D	L	GF	GA	GD	Pts	Qualification
1	Croatia (H)	0	0	0	0	0	0	0	**0**	Knockout stage
2	A2	0	0	0	0	0	0	0	**0**	Knockout stage
3	A3	0	0	0	0	0	0	0	**0**	
4	A4	0	0	0	0	0	0	0	**0**	

First match(es) will be played: 14 March 2027. Source: UEFA
Rules for classification: Tiebreakers
(H) Hosts

=== Group B ===
Pos	Team	Pld	W	D	L	GF	GA	GD	Pts	Qualification
1	B1 (H)	0	0	0	0	0	0	0	**0**	Knockout stage
2	B2	0	0	0	0	0	0	0	**0**	Knockout stage
3	B3	0	0	0	0	0	0	0	**0**	
4	B4	0	0	0	0	0	0	0	**0**	

First match(es) will be played: 14 March 2027. Source: UEFA
Rules for classification: Tiebreakers
(H) Hosts

== Knockout stage ==
In the knockout stage, extra time and penalty shoot-out are used to decide the winner if necessary, except for the third place match where extra time is not played but a direct penalty shoot-out is used, instead.

=== Bracket ===
Semi-finals
March – Osijek
Winner Group A
Runner-up Group B
March – Osijek
Winner Group B
Runner-up Group A

Final
March – Osijek
Winner SF1
Winner SF2
Third place match
March – Osijek
Loser SF1
Loser SF2
