= UEFA coefficient =

Statistics used for ranking and seeding football teams

In European football, the UEFA coefficients are statistics based in weighted arithmetic means used for ranking and seeding teams in club and international competitions. Introduced in 1979 for men's football tournaments (country rankings only), and later applied in women's football and futsal, the coefficients are calculated by UEFA, who administer football within Europe, and the Asian parts of some transcontinental countries.

The confederation publishes three types of rankings: one each analysing a single season, a five-year span, and a ten-year span. For men's competitions, three sets of coefficients are calculated:

- National team coefficient: used during 1997–2017 to rank national teams for seeding in the UEFA Euro qualifying and finals tournaments. UEFA decided after 2017 to instead seed national teams based on the:
  - Overall ranking of the biennial UEFA Nations League for the seeded draw of groups in the UEFA Euro qualification stage.
  - Overall ranking of the UEFA Euro qualification stage for the seeded draw of groups in the UEFA Euro final tournament.
- Association coefficient: used to rank the collective performance of the clubs of each member association, for assigning the number of places, and at what stage clubs enter, the UEFA Champions League, UEFA Europa League and the UEFA Conference League.
- Club coefficient (since 1990): used to rank individual clubs, for seeding in the UEFA Champions League, UEFA Europa League, UEFA Cup Winners' Cup (until 1999) and UEFA Conference League (since 2021). For the expanded format of the 2025 FIFA Club World Cup, UEFA has used a mixed style of seeding for the competition, with the winners of the 2021–2024 Champions League each receiving a place and the other 8 teams being chosen based on their UEFA Club Coefficient.

== Men's association coefficient ==
Map of UEFA associations whose teams have reached the group stage/league phase of the UEFA Champions League UEFA member association that has been represented in the group stage/league phase UEFA member association that has not been represented in the group stage/league phase Not a UEFA member

Map of UEFA associations whose teams reached the group stage/league phase of the UEFA Europa League UEFA member association that has been represented in the group stage/league phase UEFA member country that has been represented only in the group stage of the UEFA Cup before the Europa League rebranding UEFA member association that has not been represented in the group stage/league phase Not a UEFA member

Map of UEFA associations whose teams reached the group stage/league stage of the UEFA Conference League UEFA member association that has been represented in the group stage/league phase UEFA member association that has not been represented in the group stage/league phase Not a UEFA member

The association coefficient is used to rank the football associations of Europe, and thus determine the number of clubs from an association that will participate in the UEFA Champions League, the UEFA Europa League and the UEFA Conference League.

The UEFA ranking determines the number of teams competing in the season after the next, not in the first season after the publication of the ranking. Thus, the rankings at the end of the 2026–27 season determine the team allocation by association in the 2028–29 UEFA season (not 2027–28). This is unrelated to the selection of teams which will fill each allocation through the individual association leagues and national cups (which is decided in the preceding season).

This coefficient is determined by the results of the clubs of the associations in the UEFA Champions League, UEFA Europa League and the UEFA Conference League games over the past five seasons. Two points are awarded for each win by a club, and one for a draw (points are halved in the qualifying rounds). Results determined by extra time do count in determining the allocation of points, but results determined by penalty shootouts do not affect the allocation of points, other than for bonus points given for qualification into the latter rounds. The number of points awarded each season is divided by the number of teams that participated for that association in that season. This number is calculated to three decimal places then truncated (e.g. 2 2/3 would be truncated to 2.666).

To determine an association's coefficient for a particular season, the coefficients for the last five seasons are added. Bonus points are added to the number of points scored in a season. Bonus points are allocated for:

Bonus Points

2024–25 through 2026–27 seasons
Round	Champions League	Europa League	Conference League
League phase participation (1–36)	6	–	–
League phase bonus increase per ascending final ranking (9–24)	0.25	0.25	0.125
League phase bonus increase per ascending final ranking (1–8)	0.25	0.25	0.25
Maximum league phase bonus (ranked 1st, for reference)	12	6	4
Each knockout round participation (R16, QF, SF, Final)	1.5	1	0.5
2021–22 through 2023–24 seasons
Round	Champions League	Europa League	Europa Conference League
Group stage participation	4	–	–
Group winner	4	4	2
Group runner-up	4	2	1
Round of 16 participation	1	1	–
Quarter-finals participation	1	1	–
Semi-finals and Finals participation	1	1	1

UEFA uses this coefficient system to decide which teams gain automatic entry to the league phase and which teams must go through qualifying. For instance, the teams who occupy the top four league places in the associations ranked 1 to 4 in UEFA competition, the top three teams of the association ranked 5, the top two teams of the association ranked 6, and the champions in the associations ranked 7 to 10 gain automatic entry into the league phase for the following season's Champions League competition.

=== Current ranking ===
The ranking below takes into account each association's performance in European competitions from 2022–23 to 2026–27, with the 2026–27 season underway. The final ranking at the end of the 2026–27 season will be used to determine the minimum number of places for each association in the 2028–29 UEFA club competitions.

From the 2023–24 season and onward, the two highest annual coefficients are used to determine two additional European Performance Spots (one per association) in the Champions League for the next season. These associations are highlighted in bold; prior to the 2023–24 season only the leading association was highlighted.

As of 5 November 2026, the coefficients are as follows:

Ranking			Member association (L: League, C: Cup, LC: League Cup)	Coefficient						Teams (Note: Number of teams still active from association in UEFA Champions League, UEFA Europa League or UEFA Conference League.)	Places in 2028–29 season (Note: European Performance Spots: The two associations with the highest one-year coefficient in the most recent season are awarded an additional berth in the Champions League league phase.)			
2027	2026	Mvmt	Member association (L: League, C: Cup, LC: League Cup)	2022–23	2023–24	2024–25	2025–26	2026–27	Total	Teams	CL	EL	ECL	Total
1	1	–	England (L, C, LC (Note: The winner of the league cup of England is given a place in the UEFA Conference League by special permission from UEFA (replacing the lowest-ranked league team which would have qualified).))	**23.000**	17.375	**29.464**	**28.680**	**9.166**	**107.685**	9/9	4	2	1	7
2	2	–	Italy (L, C)	22.357	**21.000**	21.875	19.000	7.500	91.732	7/7	4	2	1	7
3	3	–	Spain (L, C)	16.571	16.062	**23.892**	**22.093**	7.875	86.493	8/8	4	2	1	7
4	4	–	Germany (L, C)	17.125	**19.357**	18.421	21.785	8.285	84.973	7/7	4	2	1	7
5	5	–	France (L, C)	12.583	16.250	17.928	18.321	7.214	72.296	7/7	4	2	1	7
6	6	–	Portugal (L, C)	12.500	11.000	16.250	20.500	**8.900**	69.150	5/5	3	2	1	6
7	8	+1	Belgium (L, C)	14.200	14.400	15.650	11.400	8.400	64.050	5/5	2	2	1	5
8	7	–1	Netherlands (L, C)	13.500	10.000	15.250	9.979	7.666	56.395	6/6	2	2	1	5
9	9	–	Turkey (L, C)	11.800	12.000	10.300	11.075	7.900	53.075	4/5	2	2	1	5
10	11	+1	Greece (L, C)	2.125	11.400	12.687	14.200	7.200	47.612	4/5	2	2	1	5
11	10	–1	(Czech Republic) Czechia (L, C)	6.750	13.500	10.550	11.025	4.500	46.325	4/5	2	2	1	5
12	12	–	Poland (L, C)	7.750	6.875	11.750	15.750	3.600	45.725	2/5	2	2	1	5
13	14	+1	Norway (L, C)	5.750	8.000	11.812	8.050	7.400	41.012	4/5	2	1	2	5
14	13	–1	Denmark (L, C)	5.900	8.500	7.656	12.250	6.500	40.806	4/4	2	1	2	5
15	15	–	Cyprus (L, C)	5.100	3.750	10.562	12.156	3.875	35.443	2/4	2	1	2	5
16	16	–	Switzerland (L, C)	8.500	5.200	7.050	6.200	5.250	32.200	2/4	1	1	2	4
17	17	–	Austria (L, C)	4.900	4.800	9.650	4.100	6.200	29.650	3/5	1	1	2	4
18	22	+4	Hungary (L, C)	5.875	4.500	6.625	7.437	4.875	29.312	1/4	1	1	2	4
19	20	+1	Croatia (L, C)	3.375	5.875	5.875	7.031	5.750	27.906	2/4	1	1	2	4
20	19	–1	Sweden (L, C)	6.250	1.875	11.375	5.000	2.500	27.000	1/4	1	1	2	4
21	18	–3	Scotland (L, C)	3.500	6.400	9.250	5.000	2.700	26.850	2/5	1	1	2	4
22	25	+3	Romania (L, C)	6.250	3.250	7.750	5.750	3.125	26.125	1/4	1	1	2	4
23	23	–	Ukraine (L, C)	5.700	4.100	3.600	8.312	3.125	24.837	1/4	1	1	2	4
24	27	+3	Azerbaijan (L, C)	4.000	5.875	2.875	5.812	5.625	24.187	1/4	1	1	2	4
25	21	–4	Israel (L, C)	6.250	8.750	2.875	2.875	3.375	24.125	1/4	1	1	2	4
26	26	–	Slovenia (L, C)	2.125	3.875	9.093	6.375	2.125	23.593	1/4	1	1	2	4
27	29	+2	Slovakia (L, C)	6.000	5.000	4.625	2.625	4.125	22.375	1/4	1	1	2	4
28	30	+2	Bulgaria (L, C)	4.500	4.375	3.625	5.187	4.375	22.062	2/4	1	1	2	4
29	24	–5	Serbia (L, C)	5.375	1.400	3.725	5.750	2.750	19.000	1/4	1	1	2	4
30	28	–2	Russia (L, C)	4.333 (Note: Banned from participation in Europe this season. The coefficient will be counted as zero until the completion of the season when 4.333 (the lowest coefficient obtained in the previous 5 seasons) is assigned.)	4.333	4.333	4.333	0.000	17.332	0/0	1	1	2	4
31	32	+1	Iceland (L, C)	3.000	3.833	4.562	3.625	2.000	17.020	0/4	1	1	2	4
32	31	–1	Republic of Ireland (L, C)	3.375	1.500	5.343	4.250	1.875	16.343	0/4	1	1	2	4
33	33	–	Armenia (L, C)	2.375	2.250	4.375	4.187	2.625	15.812	1/4	1	1	2	4
34	39	+5	Latvia (L, C)	2.750	1.625	3.875	2.000	4.375	14.625	1/4	1	0	3	4
35	38	+3	(Bosnia and Herzegovina) Bosnia and Herzegovina (L, C)	2.000	2.250	4.531	3.312	2.375	14.468	1/4	1	0	3	4
36	36	–	Kosovo (L, C)	2.875	3.000	2.000	3.781	2.375	14.031	0/4	1	0	3	4
37	35	–2	Finland (L, C)	2.625	1.750	2.250	3.625	3.625	13.875	1/4	1	0	3	4
38	37	–1	Kazakhstan (L, C)	1.125	3.125	3.000	3.625	2.000	12.875	1/4	1	0	3	4
39	42	+3	Liechtenstein (C) (Note: The Liechtenstein Football Association does not organise a national league competition and all its seven clubs compete in the Swiss football league system. As a result, the only competitor from Liechtenstein in European competitions is the Liechtenstein Cup winner, who qualifies for the UEFA Europa League or UEFA Conference League, depending on the association rankings.)	6.500	0.500	0.500	1.000	2.500	11.000	0/1	0	0	1	1
40	34	–6	Moldova (L, C)	3.750	2.000	2.125	1.500	0.875	10.250	0/4	1	0	3	4
41	40	–1	(Faroe Islands) Faroe Islands (L, C)	2.250	2.750	1.500	1.750	1.625	9.875	0/4	1	0	3	4
42	44	+2	Albania (L, C)	0.875	2.125	1.250	2.250	3.000	9.500	1/4	1	0	3	4
43	45	+2	North Macedonia (L, C)	1.625	1.500	0.666	3.343	1.833	8.967	0/3	1	0	3	4
44	50	+6	Belarus (L, C)	0.625	1.750	1.875	2.125	2.333	8.708	0/3	1	0	3	4
45	46	+1	Lithuania (L, C)	2.375	1.125	1.375	1.125	2.125	8.125	1/4	1	0	3	4
46	48	+2	Gibraltar (L, C)	0.875	0.166	1.500	3.333	2.000	7.874	1/3	1	0	3	4
47	49	+2	Andorra (L, C)	0.666	1.666	1.000	2.000	2.500	7.832	1/3	1	0	3	4
48	41	–7	Malta (L, C)	2.625	1.500	1.000	2.000	0.500	7.625	0/4	1	0	3	4
49	43	–6	Estonia (L, C)	1.166	0.125	1.625	1.625	2.500	7.041	0/4	1	0	3	4
50	53	+3	(Georgia (country)) Georgia (L, C)	1.125	1.250	1.250	1.125	2.000	6.750	1/4	1	0	3	4
51	47	–4	(Northern Ireland) Northern Ireland (L, C)	1.250	1.125	1.500	1.750	1.000	6.625	0/4	1	0	2	3
52	51	–1	Luxembourg (L, C)	1.125	2.250	1.250	0.750	0.875	6.250	0/4	1	0	2	3
53	52	–1	Montenegro (L, C)	1.000	1.333	2.500	1.000	0.000	5.833	0/4	1	0	2	3
54	54	–	Wales (L, C)	1.166	0.625	2.000	0.333	0.375	4.499	0/4	1	0	2	3
55	55	–	(San Marino) San Marino (L, C)	0.833	0.333	0.666	0.833	0.333	2.998	0/3	1	0	2	3

Indicates active associations which have all their teams still competing in this season's UEFA club competitions (i.e. Champions League, Europa League or Conference League).
Indicates active associations which have teams still competing in this season's UEFA club competitions.
Indicates associations which have no teams remaining in this season's UEFA club competitions.

Notes

1. Russia (RUS): On 28 February 2022, Russian football clubs and national teams were suspended from FIFA and UEFA competitions due to the 2022 Russian invasion of Ukraine. On 2 May 2022, UEFA confirmed that all Russian clubs would be excluded from the 2022–23 UEFA competitions and be assigned the minimum coefficient from the previous 5 seasons (4.333) for 2022–23. The coefficient of each club is only counted once they have played their first game in the competition. As a result, the coefficient of Russia will be counted as zero while the season is ongoing, because no clubs are participating in the UEFA competitions that season. The minimum coefficient from the previous 5 seasons will only be assigned upon completion of the season.

=== Liechtenstein's status and similar cases ===
According to the UEFA regulations a National League needs to consist of at least eight clubs to be considered valid, otherwise no participants of such a league will be allowed to enter European competitions.

- There are only seven clubs that are active in Liechtenstein, all of which play in neighbouring Switzerland's league competitions.
- Prior to the introduction of the Welsh Premier League, now known as Cymru Premier, in 1992, Wales also had a single participant in European competitions, the winner (or best placed Welsh team as several English teams also competed) of the Welsh Cup, in the now defunct UEFA Cup Winners' Cup.

=== Distribution of team competition quotas ===
==== 2024–27 ====
The following is the default access list for the 2024–25 and future seasons. Rankings in table exclude Liechtenstein which receives one Europa or Conference League qualifying berth, depending on their ranking, for their cup winner.

	Champions League					Europa League					Conference League			
Ranking	LS	QR				LS	QR				QR			
Ranking	LS	PO	Q3	Q2	Q1	LS	PO	Q3	Q2	Q1	PO	Q3	Q2	Q1
1–4	4					2					1			
5	3		1			2					1			
6	2		1			1			1				1	
7	1		1			1			1				1	
8–9	1		1				1		1				1	
10	1			1			1		1				1	
11–12		1		1			1		1				1	
13–14		1		1				1					2	
15				2				1					2	
16–22				1						1			2	
23–29					1					1			2	
30–33					1					1			1	1
34–37					1								1	2
38–49					1									3
50–54					1									2
LIE													1	

=== History ===
Following the introduction of the UEFA Cup in 1971, the competition began to grow in complexity, with more clubs than either the European Champions Cup or the Cup Winners' Cup, reaching up to four from a single country. UEFA began to publish association rankings in 1979, to identify the number of participants from each association in the UEFA Cup.

Subsequently, for statistical purposes, various rankings were introduced to portray the history of the associations. According to the pro-rated (extended) calculation system, only four associations have ever been ranked as the top European association.

Following the Heysel Stadium disaster, all English teams were banned from UEFA competitions in 1985. The ban was only lifted after five seasons, with the knock-on effects continuing to impact on English football for a total of nine years from 1986 to 1994. Having been top in 1985, England were unranked in 1990 and would not regain the top position until 2008.

==== Top associations by period ====
The following data indicates the three top-ranked associations in each five-year period. Data prior to 1975–1979 period has been calculated, but precedes the first published by the Confederation and has merely informative value. Note that the table take into account the results from the Inter-Cities Fairs Cup, which was a non-UEFA competition that took place until 1971, whose teams in the first editions were representing cities instead of clubs.

Years	1st place	Coeff.	2nd place	Coeff.	3rd place	Coeff.
1956–1960	Spain	70.833	France	40.500	Italy	36.500
1957–1961	Spain	68.333	England	41.666	Italy	36.500
1958–1962	Spain	71.933	England	34.666	Italy	31.500
1959–1963	Spain	68.433	Italy	32.500	Scotland	32.250
1960–1964	Spain	66.833	Italy	39.700	Scotland	35.750
1961–1965	Spain	52.333	Italy	43.128	England	38.849
1962–1966	Spain	53.333	England	42.682	Hungary	39.999
1963–1967	England	45.482	Spain	41.733	Italy	41.728
1964–1968	England	49.016	Hungary	43.665	Spain	41.566
1965–1969	England	53.701	Hungary	53.665	Scotland	38.366
1966–1970	England	51.951	Hungary	46.415	Scotland	39.566
1967–1971	England	51.660	Hungary	40.999	Italy	40.094
1968–1972	England	53.431	Hungary	41.666	Italy	38.660
1969–1973	England	53.231	Netherlands	41.200	Italy	37.593
1970–1974	England	54.279	Netherlands	43.500	West Germany	39.664
1971–1975	England	47.779	West Germany	46.331	Netherlands	45.200
1972–1976	West Germany	48.950	Netherlands	43.600	England	43.570
1973–1977	West Germany	51.902	England	41.999	Netherlands	39.450
1974–1978	West Germany	48.783	Netherlands	43.450	England	38.332
1975–1979	West Germany	52.617	Netherlands	39.200	Belgium	38.300
1976–1980	West Germany	53.998	England	38.426	Belgium	37.300
1977–1981	West Germany	52.284	England	38.760	Spain	36.999
1978–1982	West Germany	51.999	England	37.902	Netherlands	35.466
1979–1983	West Germany	54.118	Spain	34.999	England	34.426
1980–1984	West Germany	43.618	England	37.950	Spain	32.199
1981–1985	England	41.093	Italy	38.800	West Germany	37.070
1982–1986	Italy	39.466	West Germany	37.332	Soviet Union	36.516
1983–1987	Italy	41.716	Soviet Union	37.250	West Germany	36.332
1984–1988	Italy	41.082	Soviet Union	37.550	West Germany	36.165
1985–1989	Italy	42.498	West Germany	41.093	Spain	40.999
1986–1990	West Germany	45.427	Italy	43.212	Spain	42.666
1987–1991	Italy	48.171	West Germany	43.594	Spain	38.666
1988–1992	Italy	52.837	West Germany	42.927	Spain	40.266
1989–1993	Italy	60.337	France	40.450	West Germany	39.403
1990–1994	Italy	62.313	France	45.150	Germany	41.641
1991–1995	Italy	63.884	France	45.283	Germany	40.307
1992–1996	Italy	61.259	France	45.408	Spain	43.932
1993–1997	Italy	60.735	Spain	46.532	France	45.733
1994–1998	Italy	59.640	Germany	49.932	Spain	48.580
1995–1999	Italy	57.212	Spain	49.628	Germany	45.498
1996–2000	Spain	59.599	Italy	55.927	Germany	46.403
1997–2001	Spain	65.210	Italy	56.239	England	51.288
1998–2002	Spain	68.467	Italy	58.668	England	55.459
1999–2003	Spain	75.539	Italy	62.311	England	58.340
2000–2004	Spain	79.851	England	62.153	Italy	59.186
2001–2005	Spain	73.717	England	63.224	Italy	61.186
2002–2006	Spain	72.748	Italy	66.731	England	63.486
2003–2007	Spain	76.891	England	68.540	Italy	66.088
2004–2008	England	75.749	Spain	75.266	Italy	60.410
2005–2009	England	79.499	Spain	74.266	Italy	62.910
2006–2010	England	81.856	Spain	79.757	Italy	64.338
2007–2011	England	85.785	Spain	82.329	Germany	69.436
2008–2012	England	84.410	Spain	84.186	Germany	75.186
2009–2013	Spain	88.025	England	82.963	Germany	79.614
2010–2014	Spain	97.713	England	84.748	Germany	81.641
2011–2015	Spain	99.999	England	80.391	Germany	79.415
2012–2016	Spain	105.713	Germany	80.177	England	76.284
2013–2017	Spain	104.998	Germany	79.498	England	75.962
2014–2018	Spain	106.998	England	79.605	Italy	76.249
2015–2019	Spain	103.569	England	85.462	Italy	74.725
2016–2020	Spain	102.283	England	90.462	Germany	74.784
2017–2021	England	100.569	Spain	97.855	Italy	75.438
2018–2022	England	106.641	Spain	96.141	Italy	76.902
2019–2023	England	109.570	Spain	92.998	Germany	82.481
2020–2024	England	104.303	Italy	90.284	Spain	89.489
2021–2025	England	115.196	Italy	97.231	Spain	94.453
2022–2026	England	119.519	Italy	99.946	Spain	97.046

The table shows the ranking of nations with respect to the total number of years in the top three of the rankings:

As of May 2026

Association	1st	2nd	3rd	Total
England	21	17	10	48
Spain	23	12	12	47
Italy	13	13	17	43
Germany/West Germany	10	8	16	34
Netherlands	0	5	3	8
France	0	5	1	6
Hungary	0	5	1	6
Scotland	0	0	4	4
Soviet Union	0	2	1	3
Belgium	0	0	2	2

==== Additional Champions League Spots ====
From the 2023–24 season and onward, the two highest annual coefficients are used to determine two additional European Performance Spots (one per association) in the Champions League for the next season.

Season	1st place	Coeff.	2nd place	Coeff.	Additional Slot in
2023–2024	Italy	21.000	Germany	19.357	2024–2025
2024–2025	England	29.464	Spain	23.892	2025–2026
2025–2026	England	28.680	Spain	22.093	2026–2027

== Women's association coefficient ==
=== Current ranking ===
The ranking below takes into account of each association's performance in European competitions from 2022–23 to 2026–27.

The final ranking at the end of the 2026–27 season will be used to determine the number of places for each association in the 2028–29 UEFA club competitions.

As of 19 November 2026 the coefficients are as follows:

Ranking			Member association (L: League)	Coefficient						Teams (Note: Number of teams still active from association in UEFA Women's Champions League or UEFA Women's Europa Cup.)	Places in 2028–29 season		
2027	2026	Mvmt	Member association (L: League)	2022–23	2023–24	2024–25	2025–26	2026–27	Total	Teams	UCL	UEC	Total
1	1	–	England (L)	13.333	8.666	20.000	24.750	14.666	81.415	3/3	3	0	3
2	2	–	Spain (L)	13.000	11.000	13.833	23.500	13.500	74.833	3/3	3	0	3
3	3	–	France (L)	10.000	17.000	10.000	17.333	13.166	67.499	3/3	3	0	3
4	4	–	Germany (L)	14.000	7.333	8.833	20.250	12.166	62.582	3/3	3	0	3
5	5	–	Italy (L)	12.500	5.000	7.000	12.583	13.166	50.249	3/3	3	0	3
6	6	–	Portugal (L)	8.000	12.000	3.000	7.000	8.000	38.000	2/3	3	0	3
7	7	–	Sweden (L)	2.833	6.500	4.166	12.500	8.666	34.665	2/3	3	0	3
8	8	–	Netherlands (L)	2.500	8.000	5.000	8.666	6.333	30.499	1/3	2	1	3
9	9	–	Norway (L)	3.000	8.500	3.500	6.166	7.166	28.332	1/3	2	1	3
10	10	–	Belgium (L)	2.000	2.000	3.000	10.875	6.750	24.625	1/2	2	1	3
11	11	–	Austria (L)	4.250	3.000	2.500	7.166	5.000	21.916	1/3	2	1	3
12	14	+2	Denmark (L)	2.000	1.500	1.500	7.500	8.500	21.000	2/3	2	1	3
13	13	–	Switzerland (L)	2.750	3.000	3.000	5.000	6.000	19.750	1/2	2	1	3
14	12	–2	(Czech Republic) Czechia (L)	3.333	4.166	2.500	4.166	3.166	17.331	0/3	2	0	2
15	19	+4	Turkey (L)	1.500	1.500	4.000	4.000	6.000	17.000	0/1	2	0	2
16	32	+16	Poland (L)	1.500	1.500	1.500	2.000	8.000	14.500	0/1	2	0	2
17	16	–1	Iceland (L)	2.250	2.250	2.000	3.750	2.250	12.500	0/2	2	0	2
18	33	+15	Slovakia (L)	2.000	1.000	1.000	2.000	6.000	12.000	0/1	1	1	2
19	17	–2	Scotland (L)	2.000	2.500	2.500	3.750	1.250	12.000	0/2	1	1	2
20	29	+9	Greece (L)	2.000	2.000	2.000	1.000	3.500	10.500	0/1	1	1	2
21	18	–3	Slovenia (L)	1.500	1.500	3.000	4.500	0.000	10.500	0/2	1	1	2
22	22	–	Bosnia and Herzegovina (L)	3.000	1.500	2.000	2.000	1.500	10.000	0/1	1	1	2
23	15	–8	Ukraine (L)	3.000	2.000	2.000	1.000	1.500	9.500	0/3	1	1	2
24	21	–3	Republic of Ireland (L)	2.000	1.500	2.000	3.000	1.000	9.500	0/1	1	1	2
25	20	–5	Albania (L)	4.000	2.000	2.000	1.500	0.000	9.500	0/2	1	0	1
26	28	+2	Romania (L)	2.000	3.000	2.000	1.000	0.500	8.500	0/2	1	0	1
27	23	–4	Cyprus (L)	2.000	3.000	2.000	0.000	1.250	8.250	0/2	1	0	1
28	27	–1	Lithuania (L)	1.000	2.000	2.000	2.000	1.000	8.000	0/1	1	0	1
29	24	–5	Serbia (L)	2.000	3.000	1.500	1.250	0.000	7.750	0/2	1	0	1
30	44	+14	Kosovo (L)	1.500	1.000	1.500	0.000	3.500	7.500	0/1	1	0	1
31	40	+9	Latvia (L)	1.500	2.000	1.000	1.000	2.000	7.500	0/1	1	0	1
32	35	+3	Malta (L)	1.500	2.000	2.000	1.000	1.000	7.500	0/1	1	0	1
33	26	–7	Croatia (L)	1.500	2.000	3.000	0.000	1.000	7.500	0/2	1	0	1
34	31	–3	Finland (L)	3.000	2.000	1.500	0.000	1.000	7.500	0/1	1	0	1
35	25	–10	Hungary (L)	1.500	1.500	2.000	2.500	0.000	7.500	0/1	1	0	1
36	37	+1	Kazakhstan (L)	1.500	1.250	2.000	0.500	1.500	6.750	0/1	1	0	1
37	34	–3	Belarus (L)	2.000	1.500	1.250	1.250	0.750	6.750	0/2	1	0	1
38	39	+1	(Georgia (country)) Georgia (L)	1.000	2.000	1.500	1.000	1.000	6.500	0/1	1	0	1
39	30	–9	Luxembourg (L)	1.500	1.500	1.500	2.000	0.000	6.500	0/1	1	0	1
40	43	+3	Israel (L)	2.000	2.000	1.000	0.000	1.000	6.000	0/1	1	0	1
41	42	+1	Northern Ireland (L)	1.000	1.000	1.500	1.000	1.000	5.500	0/1	1	0	1
42	41	–1	Montenegro (L)	1.500	1.500	1.000	1.000	0.500	5.500	0/1	1	0	1
43	38	–5	North Macedonia (L)	1.000	1.000	1.500	2.000	0.000	5.500	0/1	1	0	1
44	36	–8	Russia (L)	1.750 (Note: Banned from participation in Europe this season. The coefficient will be counted as zero until the completion of the season when 1.750 (the lowest coefficient obtained in the previous 5 seasons) is assigned.)	1.750	1.750	0.000	0.000	5.250	0/0	1	0	1
45	45	–	Faroe Islands (L)	1.000	1.000	1.000	1.000	1.000	5.000	0/1	1	0	1
46	47	+1	Bulgaria (L)	1.500	1.000	1.000	0.000	1.000	4.500	0/1	1	0	1
47	50	+3	Wales (L)	1.000	1.000	1.000	0.000	1.000	4.000	0/1	1	0	1
48	46	–2	Estonia (L)	1.000	1.000	1.500	0.000	0.000	3.500	0/1	1	0	1
49	48	–1	Moldova (L)	1.000	1.500	1.000	0.000	0.000	3.500	0/1	1	0	1
50	49	–1	Armenia (L)	1.000	No entry (Note: Did not participate in European competitions that season.)	1.000	1.000	0.000	3.000	0/1	1	0	1
51	51	–	Azerbaijan (L)	No entry		1.000	0.000	0.500	1.500	0/1	1	0	1
– (Note: No rank, association did not enter in any of the seasons used for computing coefficients (NR))			Gibraltar (L)	No entry					(NR)	0/0	1	0	1
–			Andorra (NL) (Note: No women's domestic league (NL))	No entry					(NR)	0/0	NL		
–			Liechtenstein (NL)	No entry					(NR)	0/0	NL		
–			San Marino (NL)	No entry					(NR)	0/0	NL		

Indicates active associations which have all their teams still competing in this season's UEFA club competitions (i.e. UEFA Women's Champions League or UEFA Women's Europa Cup).
Indicates active associations which have teams still competing in this season's UEFA club competitions.
Indicates associations which have no teams remaining in this season's UEFA club competitions.

Notes

1. Russia (RUS): On 28 February 2022, Russian football clubs and national teams were suspended from FIFA and UEFA competitions due to the 2022 Russian invasion of Ukraine. On 2 May 2022, UEFA confirmed that Russian clubs would be excluded from the 2022–23 UEFA competitions and be assigned the minimum coefficient from the previous 5 seasons (1.750) for 2022–23. The coefficient of each club is only counted once they have played their first game in the competition. As a result, the coefficient of Russia will be counted as zero while the season is ongoing, because no clubs are participating in the UEFA competitions that season. The minimum coefficient from the previous 5 seasons will only be assigned upon completion of the season.

=== History ===
==== Top associations by period ====
The following data indicates the three top-ranked women's associations in each five-year period.

Years	1st place	Coeff.	2nd place	Coeff.	3rd place	Coeff.
2000–2004	Sweden	25.500	Germany	24.000	Denmark	17.500
2001–2005	Germany	25.000	Sweden	22.250	Denmark	15.500
2002–2006	Germany	25.750	Sweden	19.750	France	11.500
2003–2007	Germany	22.000	Sweden	20.750	England	17.500
2004–2008	Germany	37.000	Sweden	33.750	England	24.000
2005–2009	Germany	37.000	Sweden	33.750	France	24.500
2006–2010	Germany	70.666	Sweden	69.500	France	63.000
2007–2011	Germany	75.666	France	65.000	Sweden	65.000
2008–2012	Germany	85.166	France	80.000	Sweden	61.000
2009–2013	France	84.500	Germany	83.166	Sweden	58.500
2010–2014	Germany	91.666	France	78.500	Sweden	61.500
2011–2015	Germany	96.000	France	76.000	Sweden	61.500
2012–2016	Germany	89.500	France	77.000	Sweden	65.500
2013–2017	Germany	86.000	France	80.000	Sweden	61.500
2014–2018	Germany	83.000	France	78.000	England	59.000
2015–2019	France	90.500	Germany	77.500	England	53.500
2016–2020	France	94.000	Germany	73.000	Spain	56.500
2017–2021	France	92.000	Germany	75.500	England	68.500
2018–2022	France	87.333	Germany	75.666	Spain	65.166
2019–2023	France	80.833	Germany	76.666	Spain	71.166
2020–2024	France	78.333	Germany	68.999	Spain	68.166
2021–2025	England	68.499	France	68.333	Spain	66.999
2022–2026	England	75.749	Spain	74.999	France	70.666

The table shows the ranking of nations with respect to the total number of years in the top three of the rankings:

As of May 2026

League	1st	2nd	3rd	Total
Germany	13	8	0	21
France	7	8	4	19
Sweden	1	6	7	14
England	2	0	5	7
Spain	0	1	5	6
Denmark	0	0	2	2

== Men's club coefficient ==
Introduced first in 1990 with various calculation principles applied throughout the years, currently the club coefficient is either the sum of the points earned by the club in the UEFA Champions League, UEFA Europa League and UEFA Conference League over the previous five seasons or 20% of the club's association coefficient over the same period, whichever coefficient is higher. This ranking is used by UEFA to determine a club's seeding in club competition draws, including the qualifying and group stages of the FIFA Club World Cup, UEFA Champions League, UEFA Europa League, UEFA Conference League.

The clubs receive two points for a win, one point for a draw, and no points for a defeat in games of the main stages of the Champions League, Europa League and Conference League. Results determined after extra-time are included in this method, however results determined after penalty shoot-outs are not (the result is considered a draw). Bonus points for entering the Europa League or Conference League group stage / league phase are not additional to win/draw points; they provide a minimum points allowance for participating clubs, whereas bonus points for entering the Champions League group stage / league phase (and those for qualifying to the knockout stage) are additional to win/draw points.

Qualifying round results are only taken into account if the club is eliminated in one of the rounds (see table below). Otherwise, the qualifying round results are taken into account only for the calculation of the association's coefficient and are halved. The clubs do not receive any points for elimination in the Champions League or Europa League qualifying because those clubs move to the Europa League and/or Conference League and receive points from participation in that competition.

=== Current club ranking ===
The ranking below takes into account of each club's performance in European competitions from 2022–23 to 2026–27, with the 2026–27 season underway.

The top 25 clubs as of 5 November 2026 are as follows.

Ranking			Club	Association	Coefficient					
2027	2026	Mvmt	Club	Association	2022–23	2023–24	2024–25	2025–26	2026–27	Total
1	1	–	Bayern Munich	Germany	27.0	28.0	27.25	39.25	12.0	133.50
2	7	+5	Arsenal	England	17.0	22.0	36.00	44.00	13.0	132.00
3	2	–1	Real Madrid	Spain	29.0	34.0	24.50	27.00	14.0	128.50
4	3	–1	Paris Saint-Germain	France	19.0	23.0	33.50	37.50	14.0	127.00
5	5	–	Inter Milan	Italy	29.0	20.0	40.25	19.75	10.0	119.00
6	6	–	Manchester City	England	33.0	28.0	14.75	22.75	12.0	110.50
7	8	+1	Barcelona	Spain	9.0	23.0	36.25	30.00	12.0	110.25
8	4	–4	Liverpool	England	19.0	20.0	29.50	28.50	12.0	109.00
9	11	+2	Borussia Dortmund	Germany	18.0	29.0	27.75	16.00	12.0	102.75
10	9	–1	Bayer Leverkusen	Germany	19.0	29.0	23.25	19.75	6.0	97.00
11	17	+6	Aston Villa	England	0.0 (Note: Did not participate in European competitions that season)	17.0	30.25	35.75	12.0	95.00
12	10	–2	Atlético Madrid	Spain	8.0	24.0	26.50	27.25	9.0	94.75
13	13	–	Roma	Italy	22.0	21.0	14.50	17.25	9.0	83.75
14	23	+9	Club Brugge	Belgium	17.0	21.0	15.75	14.50	12.0	80.25
15	15	–	Sporting CP	Portugal	14.0	12.0	14.50	27.50	12.0	80.00
16	20	+4	Porto	Portugal	18.0	19.0	9.75	24.00	8.0	78.75
17	14	–3	Benfica	Portugal	25.0	14.0	18.75	12.25	8.0	78.00
18	19	+1	Tottenham Hotspur	England	18.0	0.0	32.25	26.75	0.0	77.00
19	22	+3	Fiorentina	Italy	20.0	22.0	20.00	14.25	0.0	76.25
20	24	+4	Real Betis	Spain	16.0	6.0	19.25	22.25	12.0	75.50
21	12	–9	Chelsea	England	21.0	0.0	30.00	23.25	0.0	74.25
22	16	–6	Atalanta	Italy	0.0	28.0	21.00	19.00	3.0	71.00
23	26	+3	PSV Eindhoven	Netherlands	11.0	17.0	21.25	12.00	9.0	70.25
24	21	–3	Manchester United	England	19.0	7.0	32.50	0.00	10.0	68.50
25	42	+17	Fenerbahçe	Turkey	17.0	14.0	11.25	10.50	10.0	62.75

Indicates clubs still active in this season's Champions League.
Indicates clubs still active in this season's Europa League.
Indicates clubs still active in this season's Conference League.
Indicates clubs that have no matches remaining in this season's UEFA club competitions.

=== Club point allocations ===
==== 2024–25 through 2026–27 seasons ====
Round	Points awarded		
Round	Champions League	Europa League	Conference League
First qualifying round elimination	move to ECL Q2		1
Second qualifying round elimination	move to EL Q3	move to ECL Q3	1.5
Third qualifying round elimination	move to EL PO	move to ECL PO	2
Play-off elimination	move to EL LP	move to ECL LP	2.5
All wins from league phase onwards (except CL/EL/ECL knockout round play-offs)	2		
All draws from league phase onwards (except CL/EL/ECL knockout round play-offs)	1		
League phase minimum points awarded (if not achieved from match wins or draws)	–	3	2.5
League phase bonus	6	–	–
League phase bonus increase per ascending final ranking (9–24)	0.25	0.25	0.125
League phase bonus increase per ascending final ranking (1–8)	0.25		
Maximum league phase bonus (ranked 1st, for reference)	12	6	4
Each knockout round participation bonus (R16, QF, SF, Final)	1.5	1	0.5

==== 2021–22 through 2023–24 seasons ====
Round	Points awarded		
Round	Champions League	Europa League	Europa Conference League
Preliminary Round elimination	move to ECL Q2	–	–
First qualifying round elimination	move to ECL Q2	–	1
Second qualifying round elimination	move to EL Q3	–	1.5
Third qualifying round elimination	move to EL PO	move to ECL PO	2
Play-off elimination	move to EL GS	move to ECL GS	2.5
Group stage participation	4	3 (minimum)	2.5 (minimum)
All wins from group stage onwards (except EL/ECL knockout round play-offs)	2	2	2
All draws from group stage onwards (except EL/ECL knockout round play-offs)	1	1	1
Group winner	–	4	2
Group runners-up	–	2	1
Round of 16 participation	5	1	–
Quarter-finals participation	1	1	–
Semi-finals and Finals participation	1	1	1

=== Top club by period ===
The following data indicate the top-ranked clubs in each 5-year period. Data prior to 1975–1979 period has been calculated, but precedes the first published by the Confederation and has merely informative value.

Years	Club	Coeff.
1975–1979	(West Germany) Borussia Mönchengladbach	8.402
1976–1980	(West Germany) Borussia Mönchengladbach	7.985
1977–1981	(Spain) Barcelona	7.652
1978–1982	(Spain) Barcelona	7.832
1979–1983	(Spain) Barcelona	7.998
1980–1984	(England) Liverpool	8.277
1981–1985	(England) Liverpool	9.054
1982–1986	(Belgium) Anderlecht	7.915
1982–1986	(Italy) Juventus	7.915
1983–1987	(Italy) Juventus	8.665
1984–1988	(Italy) Juventus	8.388
1985–1989	(West Germany) Bayern Munich	7.846
1986–1990	(West Germany) Bayern Munich	8.096
1987–1991	(Italy) Juventus	8.291
1988–1992	(Spain) Real Madrid	7.975
1989–1993	(Spain) Real Madrid	7.850
1990–1994	(Spain) Real Madrid	7.600
1991–1995	(Spain) Real Madrid	7.266
1992–1996	(Netherlands) Ajax	9.124
1993–1997	(Italy) Juventus	8.719
1994–1998	(France) Paris Saint-Germain	8.716
1995–1999	(Italy) Juventus	121.606
1996–2000	(Italy) Juventus	109.963
1997–2001	(Spain) Real Madrid	114.605
1998–2002	(Spain) Real Madrid	147.233
1999–2003	(Spain) Real Madrid	151.769
2000–2004	(Spain) Real Madrid	146.350
2001–2005	(Spain) Real Madrid	131.326
2002–2006	(Italy) Milan	129.020
2003–2007	(Italy) Milan	133.808
2004–2008	(England) Chelsea	124.996
2005–2009	(Spain) Barcelona	121.853
2006–2010	(Spain) Barcelona	136.951
2007–2011	(England) Manchester United	151.157
2008–2012	(Spain) Barcelona	157.837
2009–2013	(Spain) Barcelona	157.605
2010–2014	(Spain) Real Madrid	161.542
2011–2015	(Spain) Real Madrid	171.999
2012–2016	(Spain) Real Madrid	176.142
2013–2017	(Spain) Real Madrid	176.999
2014–2018	(Spain) Real Madrid	162.000
2015–2019	(Spain) Real Madrid	146.000
2016–2020	(Germany) Bayern Munich	136.000
2017–2021	(Germany) Bayern Munich	134.000
2018–2022	(Germany) Bayern Munich	138.000
2019–2023	(England) Manchester City	145.000
2020–2024	(England) Manchester City	148.000
2021–2025	(Spain) Real Madrid	143.500
2022–2026	(Germany) Bayern Munich	147.500

Top-rated clubs listed by number of times they were top-ranked over a 5-year period since the first period officially analysed (1975–1979):

Rank	Club	Total
1	(Spain) Real Madrid	16
2	(Spain) Barcelona	7
2	(Italy) Juventus	7
4	(Germany) Bayern Munich	6
5	(West Germany) Borussia Mönchengladbach	2
5	(England) Liverpool	2
5	(England) Manchester City	2
5	(Italy) Milan	2
9	(Netherlands) Ajax	1
9	(Belgium) Anderlecht	1
9	(England) Chelsea	1
9	(England) Manchester United	1
9	(France) Paris Saint-Germain	1

== Women's club coefficient ==
A club's five-season coefficient is the cumulative total of its five-season coefficients from the reference period and 20% of its association's five-season association's coefficient. This ranking is used by UEFA to determine a club's seeding in club competition draws, including the qualifying and group stages of the UEFA Women's Champions League.

The distribution of points is symmetrical to the distribution of points in association ranking.

=== Current team ranking ===
The ranking below takes into account of each team's performance in European competitions from 2022–23 to 2026–27, with the 2026–27 season underway.

The top 25 clubs as of 19 November 2026 are as follows:

Ranking			Club	Association	Coefficient					
2027	2026	Mvmt	Club	Association	2022–23	2023–24	2024–25	2025–26	2026–27	Club
1	1	–	Barcelona	Spain	26.0	26.0	25.0	33.00	16.0	126.00
2	2	–	OL Lyonnes	France	15.0	25.0	24.0	27.75	16.0	105.75
3	3	–	Chelsea	England	20.0	21.0	20.0	22.50	15.0	98.50
4	4	–	Bayern Munich	Germany	17.0	10.0	14.0	25.25	15.0	81.25
5	5	–	Arsenal	England	18.0	2.0	23.0	23.00	13.0	79.00
6	6	–	VfL Wolfsburg	Germany	23.0	3.0	11.0	17.00	9.0	63.00
7	8	+1	Real Madrid	Spain	10.0	5.0	15.0	17.50	14.0	61.50
8	11	+3	Roma	Italy	14.0	8.0	10.0	10.00	12.0	54.00
9	7	–2	Paris Saint-Germain	France	13.0	17.0	3.0	9.00	11.0	53.00
10	9	–1	Juventus	Italy	11.0	2.0	8.0	15.25	13.0	49.25
11	10	–1	BK Häcken	Sweden	3.0	13.0	3.0	19.00	9.0	47.00
12	12	–	Benfica	Portugal	8.0	12.0	3.0	9.00	11.0	43.00
13	14	+1	Paris FC	France	2.0	9.0	3.0	13.75	11.0	38.75
14	13	–1	Eintracht Frankfurt	Germany	2.0	9.0	1.5	15.50	9.0	37.00
15	19	+4	Manchester City	England	2.0	0.0 (Note: Did not participate in European competitions that season)	17.0	0.00	14.0	33.00
16	17	+1	Hammarby IF	Sweden	0.0	0.0	8.0	15.50	8.5	32.00
17	22	+5	Brann	Norway	3.0	14.0	0.0	4.00	9.0	30.00
18	16	–2	St. Pölten	Austria	7.0	5.0	4.0	8.00	4.0	28.00
19	24	+5	Ajax	Netherlands	3.0	13.0	2.0	2.50	7.0	27.50
20	21	+1	Sparta Prague	(Czech Republic) Czechia	3.0	3.0	2.0	10.00	5.5	23.50
21	15	–6	Twente	Netherlands	2.0	3.0	8.0	10.00	0.0	23.00
22	18	–4	Slavia Prague	(Czech Republic) Czechia	6.0	8.0	3.0	3.50	2.0	22.50
23	35	+12	OH Leuven	Belgium	0.0	0.0	0.0	12.25	9.0	21.25
24	20	–4	Vålerenga	Norway	0.0	3.0	5.0	10.00	3.0	21.00
25	23	–2	Manchester United	England	0.0	3.0	0.0	17.75	0.0	20.75

Indicates clubs still active in this season's UEFA Women's Champions League.
Indicates clubs still active in this season's UEFA Women's Europa Cup.
Indicates clubs have no remaining games in this season's UEFA club competitions.

=== Club point allocations ===
==== 2025–26 and future seasons ====
Round		Points awarded	
Round		Women's Champions League	Women's Europa Cup
First Qualifying Round	Clubs defeated in third-place match	0.5	–
First Qualifying Round	Winners of third-place match (four-team mini-tournament) or clubs defeated in MD1 tie (three-team mini-tournament)	1	–
First Qualifying Round	Defeated finalists	1.5	–
First Qualifying Round	Clubs eliminated	–	1.5
Second Qualifying Round	Clubs defeated in a third-place match	2	–
Second Qualifying Round	Winners of third-place match	1 + move to EC Q1	–
Second Qualifying Round	Defeated finalists	1.5 + move to EC Q2	–
Second Qualifying Round	Clubs eliminated	–	2
Third Qualifying Round	Defeated teams	2 + move to EC Q2	–
League Phase onwards	All wins league phase onwards (except knockout phase play-offs)	2	–
League Phase onwards	All draws league phase onwards	1	–
League Phase onwards	League phase bonus	7	–
League Phase onwards	League phase bonus increase per ascending final ranking (1–12)	0.25	–
League Phase onwards	Maximum league phase bonus (ranked 1st, for reference)	10	–
Round of 16 onwards	All wins round of 16 onwards	–	2
Round of 16 onwards	All draws round of 16 onwards	–	1
Knockout phase (except knockout phase play-offs)	Round of 16 participation bonus	–	2.5
Knockout phase (except knockout phase play-offs)	Each knockout round participation bonus (QF, SF, Final)	1	0.5

==== 2021–22 through 2024–25 ====
Round	Points awarded
Round	Women's Champions League
Preliminary Round elimination	0.5
The defeated club of the round 1 third-place match	1
The winner of the round 1 third-place match (four-team mini-tournament) or defeated team in the MD1 tie (three-team mini-tournament)	1.5
Round 1 defeated finalist	2
Round 2 elimination	3
Group stage participation	4
Win in group stage or subsequent round	2
Draw in group stage or subsequent round	1
Quarter-finals, semi-finals and finals participation	1

=== Top club by period ===
The following data indicate the top-ranked women's clubs in each 5-year period.

Years	Club	Coeff.
2001–2005	(Sweden) Umeå	68.250
2002–2006	(Germany) Turbine Potsdam	59.750
2003–2007	(Germany) Turbine Potsdam	64.000
2004–2008	(Germany) Frankfurt	99.000
2005–2009	(Germany) Frankfurt	86.000
2006–2010	(Sweden) Umeå	94.750
2007–2011	(France) Lyon	94.450
2008–2012	(France) Lyon	123.400
2009–2013	(France) Lyon	132.885
2010–2014	(France) Lyon	127.905
2011–2015	(France) Lyon	115.080
2012–2016	(Germany) Wolfsburg	116.535
2013–2017	(Germany) Wolfsburg	129.380
2014–2018	(Germany) Wolfsburg	125.390
2015–2019	(France) Lyon	129.865
2016–2020	(France) Lyon	143.020
2017–2021	(France) Lyon	124.400
2018–2022	(France) Lyon	128.466
2019–2023	(Spain) Barcelona	126.233
2020–2024	(Spain) Barcelona	130.633
2021–2025	(Spain) Barcelona	124.000
2022–2026	(Spain) Barcelona	135.000

Top-rated women's clubs listed by number of times they were top-ranked over a 5-year period since the first period officially analysed (2001–2005):

Rank	Club	Total
1	(France) Lyon	9
2	(Spain) Barcelona	4
3	(Germany) Wolfsburg	3
4	(Germany) Frankfurt	2
4	(Germany) Turbine Potsdam	2
4	(Sweden) Umeå	2

== Men's amateur coefficient ==
UEFA calculates coefficients for each association that takes part in the UEFA Regions' Cup. These coefficients are calculated to compile ranking lists that are used to determine the round in which each team enters the competition and to seed the teams for the draws. The coefficient ranking list is established for the preliminary and intermediate round draws on the basis of the associations’ results in the three most recent completed seasons at the time of the draws. For the 2024–25 competition, the coefficient ranking list is therefore based on the associations' results in the seasons 2016–17, 2018–19 and 2022–23.

As of 10 December 2025 the coefficients are as follows:

Rank	Member association	Coefficient				Pots
Rank	Member association	2018–19	2022–23	2024–25	Total	Pots
1	Spain	5.000	5.333	6.000	16.333	A
2	Poland	5.000	5.000	5.000	15.000	A
3	(Czech Republic) Czechia	4.333	4.333	5.000	13.667	A
4	Serbia	3.000	5.000	5.000	13.000	A
5	Croatia	3.000	3.333	5.000	11.333	A
6	Slovakia	3.667	3.000	3.000	9.667	A
7	Portugal	3.333	4.000	2.333	9.667	A
8	(Bosnia and Herzegovina) Bosnia and Herzegovina	2.000	4.333	3.000	9.333	A
9	(Republic of Ireland) Republic of Ireland	1.667	5.000	2.667	9.333	B
10	Turkey	5.000	2.000	2.333	9.333	B
11	Finland	2.000	2.333	4.333	8.667	B
12	(San Marino) San Marino	1.000	2.333	5.000	8.333	B
13	Italy	3.000	2.333	3.000	8.333	B
14	Bulgaria	3.000	1.667	3.000	7.667	B
15	Hungary	3.333	2.333	1.667	7.333	B
16	Wales	2.000	3.000	2.000	7.000	B
17	England	2.000	2.333	2.667	7.000	C
18	(Northern Ireland) Northern Ireland	2.000	2.000	2.333	6.333	C
19	Romania	2.667	1.333	2.000	6.000	C
20	Belarus	1.000	2.667	2.000	5.667	C
21	Israel	2.500	3.000	No entry	5.500	C
22	Slovenia	1.333	2.000	1.333	4.667	C
23	North Macedonia	1.500	1.667	1.000	4.167	C
24	(Georgia (country)) Georgia	0.333	1.800	2.000	4.133	C
25	Malta	1.000	2.000	1.000	4.000	D
26	Latvia	1.000	1.333	1.000	3.333	D
27	Moldova	1.000	1.333	1.000	3.333	D
28	Kazakhstan	1.000	1.000	0.000	2.000	D
29	Albania	No entry		2.000	2.000	D
30	Sweden	0.333	1.000	0.500	1.833	D
31	Azerbaijan	1.000	0.000	0.500	1.500	D
32	Armenia	No entry		1.500	1.500	Preliminary round
33	Estonia	0.000	0.000	0.000	0.000	Preliminary round
34	Lithuania	2.500	No entry		NR	Preliminary round
DNE	Ukraine	3.000	1.000	TBC	TBC	
DNE	Switzerland	3.000	2.000	TBC	TBC	
DNE	Germany	4.667	4.000	No entry	8.667	
DNE	Russia	4.333	Banned		4.333	
DNE	France	5.000	No entry		5.000	
DNE	Scotland	0.667	2.333	TBC	TBC	
DNE	Greece	1.333	No entry		1.333	
DNE	Andorra	No entry			NR	
DNE	Austria	No entry			NR	
DNE	Belgium	No entry			NR	
DNE	Cyprus	No entry			NR	
DNE	Denmark	No entry			NR	
DNE	(Faroe Islands) Faroe Islands	No entry			NR	
DNE	Gibraltar	No entry			NR	
DNE	Iceland	No entry			NR	
DNE	Kosovo	No entry			NR	
DNE	Liechtenstein	No entry			NR	
DNE	Luxembourg	No entry			NR	
DNE	Montenegro	No entry			NR	
DNE	Netherlands	No entry			NR	
DNE	Norway	No entry			NR	

Points are awarded for each match played in the qualifying competition. Match points are awarded in accordance with the final scores as ratified by UEFA. Final tournament matches and penalty shoot-outs are not taken into consideration. In addition to the match points, the bonus points are awarded for each season.The points are given as follows:

Round	Points awarded
Automatic qualification for intermediate round	3
Qualification from preliminary to intermediate round	3
Qualification from intermediate round to final tournament	3
Win in preliminary and intermediate round	3
Draw in preliminary and intermediate round	1
Runner up of the final tournament	2
Winner of the final tournament	3

== Futsal tournaments' coefficient ==
=== Men's national team ===
Since 2020 FIFA Futsal World Cup qualification, the UEFA coefficients are based on the Elo rating system and are constantly updated to all non-friendly matches. This ranking is used to seed national teams on UEFA competitions and to decide the number of clubs from an association that will participate in the UEFA Futsal Champions League. The rating below is the situation after the UEFA Futsal Euro 2022 qualifications have been played:

Team	Coeff.	Rank
Spain	2493.789	1
Russia	2464.226	2
Portugal	2450.616	3
Kazakhstan	2385.842	4
Croatia	2051.589	5
Azerbaijan	2015.589	6
Serbia	2007.570	7
Italy	1934.516	8
Czech Republic	1887.535	9
Ukraine	1856.420	10
Slovenia	1841.333	11
Bosnia and Herzegovina	1837.207	12
Poland	1781.027	13
Finland	1750.097	14
Romania	1738.151	15
Slovakia	1737.666	16
Georgia	1694.055	17

Team	Coeff.	Rank
Belarus	1688.976	18
Netherlands	1641.410	19
Hungary	1637.232	20
France	1615.979	21
Belgium	1607.692	22
Latvia	1464.140	23
North Macedonia	1449.976	24
Moldova	1419.922	25
Montenegro	1321.596	26
Albania	1299.617	27
Kosovo	1264.428	28
Turkey	1255.233	29
Norway	1255.233	30
Denmark	1236.240	31
Sweden	1235.426	32
Armenia	1217.145	33
England	1204.183	34

Team	Coeff.	Rank
Germany	1188.549	35
Greece	1155.396	36
Israel	1142.105	37
Switzerland	1098.903	38
Cyprus	1085.011	39
Bulgaria	1063.645	40
Wales	1011.432	41
Lithuania	910.904	42
Andorra	910.044	43
San Marino	853.043	44
Estonia	849.940	45
Malta	837.380	46
Scotland	816.083	47
Gibraltar	780.661	48
Austria	728.018	49
Northern Ireland	724.015	50

=== Women's national team ===
==== 2020 ranking ====
The coefficients from 2020 used for the seeding and pot placements in the draw for UEFA Women's Futsal Euro 2022, were based on results on 2019 edition.

Team	Coeff.	Rank
Spain	10.000	1
Portugal	8.000	2
Russia	5.667	3
Ukraine	5.667	4
Hungary	2.667	5
Finland	2.333	6
Italy	2.333	7
Croatia	2.333	8
Sweden	2.000	9
Czech Republic	1.667	10
Poland	1.667	11
Belarus	1.417	12

Team	Coeff.	Rank
Slovenia	1.000	13
Kazakhstan	1.000	14
Serbia	1.000	15
Netherlands	0.500	16
Armenia	0.500	17
Belgium	0.500	18
Lithuania	0.250	19
Slovakia	0.250	20
Moldova	0.250	21
Northern Ireland	0.000	22
Bosnia and Herzegovina	–	–
Gibraltar	–	–

=== Men's futsal club coefficient ===
The club coefficient, used to determine seeds and entrance round on the UEFA Futsal Champions League, is the sum of the points earned by the club in that competition on the previous three seasons and 50% of the club's association coefficient over the same period. The association coefficient is the sum of the points earned by all the clubs of the association. Even though all calculation procedures are public for association and club coefficients, UEFA only publishes the coefficients of the clubs competing in the next season of UEFA Futsal Champions League.

Round	Points awarded
Win in preliminary round	1
Draw in preliminary round	0.5
Win in main or subsequent round	2
Draw in main or subsequent round	1
Main round participation	1
Elite round, semi-finals and finals participation	3

The coefficients for the top 16 teams competing on 2022–23 UEFA Futsal Champions League are as follows:

Rank	Team	Association	Coeff.
1	Barcelona	Spain	79.833
2	Sporting CP	Portugal	60.166
3	Benfica	Portugal	44.499
4	Palma Futsal	Spain	34.833
5	Kairat	Kazakhstan	26.999
6	Dobovec	Slovenia	19.499
7	MFC Kherson	Ukraine	14.333
8	Ayat	Kazakhstan	14.333

Rank	Team	Association	Coeff.
9	Novo Vrijeme Makarska	Croatia	11.333
10	Sporting Anderlecht Futsal	Belgium	10.500
11	ZVV Hovocubo	Netherlands	9.000
12	Haladas VSE	Hungary	9.000
13	FK Chrudim	Czech Republic	8.667
14	Kauno Žalgiris	Lithuania	7.500
15	Stalitsa Minsk	Belarus	7.333
16	Mostar SG	Bosnia and Herzegovina	7.000

== Youth tournaments' coefficient ==
=== UEFA Under-19 ===
Team	Coeff	Rank
Portugal	24.722	1
Germany	22.778	2
England	21.889	3
Austria	19.000	4
France	18.556	5
Netherlands	17.667	6
Spain	16.500	7
Ukraine	14.833	8
Czech Republic	14.833	9
Serbia	14.667	10
Russia	14.611	11
Italy	14.222	12
Greece	12.500	13
Sweden	12.111	14
Georgia	11.833	15

Team	Coeff	Rank
Croatia	11.778	16
Israel	11.333	17
Belgium	11.167	18
Turkey	11.000	19
Bulgaria	10.556	20
Slovakia	9.833	21
Republic of Ireland	9.000	22
Hungary	9.000	23
Scotland	8.833	24
Switzerland	8.500	25
Denmark	8.500	26
Poland	8.167	27
Montenegro	8.000	28

Team	Coeff	Rank
Norway	7.667	29
Bosnia and Herzegovina	6.833	30
Wales	6.333	31
Slovenia	6.167	32
Romania	5.333	33
Cyprus	5.167	34
Lithuania	4.667	35
Finland	4.667	36
Northern Ireland	4.000	37
Iceland	4.000	38
Azerbaijan	4.000	39
Belarus	3.333	40
North Macedonia	3.333	41

Team	Coeff	Rank
Latvia	3.000	42
Albania	2.667	43
Luxembourg	2.667	44
Estonia	2.667	45
Armenia	2.333	–
Malta	2.333	46
Andorra	1.333	47
Faroe Islands	1.333	48
Moldova	1.000	49
Liechtenstein	0.333	50
Gibraltar	0.333	51
Kazakhstan	0.333	52
San Marino	0.000	53
Kosovo	–	54

=== UEFA Under-17 ===
Team	Coeff	Rank
Spain	25.889	1
England	25.000	2
Germany	24.167	3
Netherlands	23.778	4
France	20.611	5
Italy	19.667	6
Belgium	19.111	7
Portugal	18.222	8
Republic of Ireland	17.167	9
Austria	14.333	10
Sweden	14.000	11
Serbia	13.778	12
Scotland	13.222	13
Russia	13.111	14
Bosnia and Herzegovina	13.000	15
Croatia	12.556	16
Israel	11.333	17
Hungary	11.111	18
Slovenia	10.889	19

Team	Coeff	Rank
Poland	10.833	20
Turkey	10.833	21
Ukraine	10.722	22
Norway	10.722	23
Czech Republic	10.611	24
Greece	10.556	25
Switzerland	10.111	26
Denmark	9.333	27
Slovakia	9.167	28
Finland	7.833	29
Azerbaijan	7.000	30
Georgia	6.833	31
Cyprus	6.833	32
Wales	6.500	33
Iceland	6.333	34
Belarus	6.167	35
Bulgaria	5.333	36
Romania	5.000	37
Northern Ireland	4.167	38

Team	Coeff	Rank
North Macedonia	3.833	39
Montenegro	3.667	40
Faroe Islands	3.222	41
Lithuania	2.667	42
Latvia	2.667	43
Estonia	2.333	44
Albania	2.333	45
Armenia	2.000	46
Luxembourg	1.667	47
Moldova	1.667	48
Kazakhstan	1.000	49
Liechtenstein	1.000	50
Andorra	0.333	51
San Marino	0.333	52
Gibraltar	0.333	53
Malta	0.000	54
Kosovo	0.000	55

=== UEFA Women's Under-19 ===
Team	Coeff	Rank
Spain	33.000	1
France	27.944	2
Germany	26.500	3
Netherlands	21.722	4
Norway	19.333	5
Denmark	18.167	6
Sweden	17.944	7
Switzerland	16.278	8
Italy	15.222	9
England	15.167	10
Scotland	12.611	11
Finland	12.333	12

Team	Coeff	Rank
Belgium	11.667	13
Czech Republic	11.500	14
Austria	11.167	15
Russia	9.833	16
Portugal	9.667	17
Republic of Ireland	9.500	18
Serbia	9.167	19
Poland	9.000	20
Hungary	8.833	21
Iceland	8.667	22
Northern Ireland	8.000	23
Slovakia	7.833	24

Team	Coeff	Rank
Turkey	7.333	25
Slovenia	7.000	26
Ukraine	6.000	27
Azerbaijan	5.667	28
Israel	5.500	29
Greece	5.333	30
Romania	4.833	31
Belarus	4.667	32
Wales	4.500	33
Croatia	4.000	34
Bosnia and Herzegovina	3.667	35
Faroe Islands	3.000	36

Team	Coeff	Rank
Moldova	2.333	37
Montenegro	1.667	38
Albania	1.333	39
Latvia	1.000	40
Bulgaria	1.000	41
Estonia	0.333	42
Georgia	0.333	–
North Macedonia	0.333	43
Cyprus	0.333	44
Kosovo	0.333	45
Lithuania	0.000	46
Kazakhstan	0.000	47
Armenia	0.000	48

=== UEFA Women's Under-17 ===
Team	Coeff	Rank
Spain	32.056	1
Germany	31.167	2
England	22.889	3
Norway	21.000	4
Netherlands	17.667	5
France	17.278	6
Republic of Ireland	15.722	7
Switzerland	15.111	8
Italy	15.056	9
Finland	13.833	10
Czech Republic	12.889	11
Denmark	12.833	12
Poland	12.722	13

Team	Coeff	Rank
Austria	11.833	14
Belgium	11.667	15
Sweden	11.500	–
Serbia	11.500	16
Iceland	11.500	17
Hungary	10.000	18
Scotland	10.000	19
Russia	8.667	20
Slovenia	7.833	21
Portugal	7.000	22
Turkey	6.333	23
Greece	6.000	24

Team	Coeff	Rank
Belarus	6.000	25
Bosnia and Herzegovina	5.833	26
Wales	5.167	27
Slovakia	5.000	28
Northern Ireland	4.833	29
Ukraine	4.500	30
Romania	4.000	31
Bulgaria	4.000	32
Lithuania	3.333	33
Azerbaijan	3.167	34
Israel	2.667	35

Team	Coeff	Rank
Croatia	2.333	36
Montenegro	1.333	37
North Macedonia	1.333	38
Faroe Islands	1.000	39
Latvia	1.000	40
Malta	1.000	41
Estonia	0.333	42
Kazakhstan	0.333	43
Moldova	0.000	44
Georgia	0.000	45
Albania	–	46

=== Futsal Club's (Nation) ===
Rank	Association	Coeff.	Teams
1	Spain	10.022	
2	Portugal	9.633	
3	Kazakhstan	9.000	
4	Ukraine	8.389	1
5	Azerbaijan	7.822	1
6	Italy	7.444	1
7	Serbia	6.833	1
8	Slovenia	6.500	1
9	Croatia	4.278	1
10	Hungary	4.111	1
11	(Czech Republic) Czechia	3.611	1
12	Romania	3.500	1
13	Poland	3.389	1
14	France	2.944	1
15	Slovakia	2.944	1
16	Belarus	2.889	1
17	Netherlands	2.278	1
18	(Bosnia and Herzegovina) Bosnia and Herzegovina	2.222	1

Rank	Association	Coeff.	Teams
19	Belgium	2.111	1
20	(Georgia (country)) Georgia	2.056	1
21	North Macedonia	2.000	1
22	Finland	1.694	1
23	Latvia	1.222	1
24	Turkey	1.222	1
25	Moldova	0.833	1
26	England	0.833	1
27	Albania	0.778	1
28	Sweden	0.778	1
29	Montenegro	0.722	1
30	Denmark	0.722	1
31	Norway	0.722	1
32	Kosovo	0.667	1
33	Switzerland	0.583	1
34	Bulgaria	0.556	1
35	Armenia	0.500	1
36	Greece	0.500	1

Rank	Association	Coeff.	Teams
37	Germany	0.500	1
38	Wales	0.389	1
39	Lithuania	0.389	1
40	Cyprus	0.389	1
41	Israel	0.278	1
42	Andorra	0.222	1
43	Estonia	0.111	1
44	Malta	0.000	1
45	Gibraltar	0.000	1
46	(San Marino) San Marino	0.000	1
47	Scotland	0.000	1
NR	Austria	0.000	1
NR	Iceland	0.000	1
NR	Luxembourg	0.000	1
NR	(Northern Ireland) Northern Ireland	0.000	1
NR	(Republic of Ireland) Republic of Ireland	0.000	1
NR	(Faroe Islands) Faroe Islands	0.000	DNE
NR	Liechtenstein	0.000	DNE

== Criticisms ==
The UEFA coefficient system has been criticised for being likely to preserve the status quo for rankings and seedings, as well as for favouring teams from stronger leagues.

== See also ==
- AFC club competitions ranking, a similar system used by the Asian Football Confederation
- CAF 5-year ranking, a similar system used by the Confederation of African Football
- CONMEBOL ranking of the Copa Libertadores, a similar system used by CONMEBOL (clubs only)
- UEFA Respect Fair Play ranking

== Sources ==
- League and club coefficients at kassiesa.net
- UEFA Access List (PDF)
