= UEFA Euro 2022 =

UEFA Euro 2022 may refer to:

- UEFA Women's Euro 2022, July 2022
- UEFA Futsal Euro 2022, January to February 2022
- UEFA Women's Futsal Euro 2022, July 2022
