= Maria Stamate =

Romanian footballer (born 1999)

Personal information
- Date of birth: 22 June 1999 (age 27)
- Position: Midfielder

Team information
- Current team: Olimpia Cluj
- Number: 22

Senior career*
| Years | Team | Apps | (Gls) |
| –2020 | Universitatea Galați | | |
| 2020– | U Olimpia Cluj | | |

International career^{‡}
| 2017 | Romania U19 | 1 | (0) |
| 2018 | Romania Futsal | | |
| 2020– | Romania | 1 | (0) |
- * Club domestic league appearances and goals ‡ National team caps and goals as of 13:51, 31 January 2021 (UTC)

Maria Stamate (born 22 June 1999) is a Romanian footballer who plays as a midfielder for Olimpia Cluj and the Romania women's national team.

== Career ==
Stamate made her debut for the Romania women's national team on 27 October 2020 against Switzerland, coming on as a substitute for Andreea Corduneanu.
