= Alexandra Atamaniuk =

French association footballer (born 1995)

Personal information
- Date of birth: 11 June 1995 (age 31)
- Place of birth: Essey-lès-Nancy, Meurthe-et-Moselle, France
- Height: 1.60 m (5 ft 3 in)
- Position: Midfielder

Team information
- Current team: Toulouse FC
- Number: 17

Youth career
- 2002–2008: FC Seichamps
- 2008–2010: Saint-Max Essey FC
- 2010–2013: Vendenheim
- 2013–2014: Saint-Étienne

Senior career*
Years	Team	Apps	(Gls)
2011–2013	Vendenheim	32	(3)
2013–2014	Saint-Étienne	13	(1)
2014–2016	Nancy	41	(8)
2016–2018	Dijon	37	(6)
2022–2024	Brest	42	(5)
2024–	Toulouse FC	16	(1)

International career
2012	France U17	10	(2)
2013–2014	France U19	7	(0)
2014	France U20	1	(0)
- * Club domestic league appearances and goals as of 23 June 2025

Alexandra Atamaniuk (born 11 June 1995) is a French footballer who plays as a midfielder for Première Ligue club Toulouse FC.

== Honours ==
=== International ===
- France U17
  - 2012 FIFA U-17 Women's World Cup winner in Azerbaijan, 2012
