= Kazakhstan women's national futsal team =

Kazakhstan
- Association: Kazakhstan Football Federation
- Confederation: UEFA (Europe)
- FIFA code: KAZ
- FIFA ranking: 64 (24 September 2026)

First international
- Kazakhstan 0–8 Belarus (Ciorescu, Ukraine; 12 September 2018)

Biggest win
- None

Biggest defeat
- Kazakhstan 1–11 Slovenia (Prienai, Lithuania; 12 May 2022)

The Kazakhstan women's national futsal team represents Kazakhstan in international women's futsal competitions. It is governed by the Kazakhstan Football Federation.

== History ==
Kazakhstan joined the main round of the UEFA Women's Futsal Euro 2019 in September 2018, their first ever competition.

== Tournament records ==
=== FIFA Futsal Women's World Cup ===
FIFA Futsal Women's World Cup record
Year	Round	Position	GP	W	D	L	GS	GA
(Philippines) 2025	Did not qualify							
Total	–	0/1	0	0	0	0	0	0

=== UEFA European Championship ===
UEFA European Championship								Qualification record					
Year	Round	Pld	W	D	L	GF	GA	Pld	W	D	L	GF	GA
(Portugal) 2019	Did not qualify							3	0	0	3	4	23
(Portugal) 2022	Did not qualify							Withdrew					
(Hungary) 2023	Did not qualify							3	0	1	2	5	22
(Croatia) 2027	Did not qualify							3	0	0	3	3	20
Total	0/4	0	0	0	0	0	0	9	0	1	8	12	65
