= Romania women's national futsal team =

Romania Futsal
- Nickname(s): Tricolorele (The Tricolours)
- Association: Federația Română de Fotbal (FRF)
- Confederation: UEFA (Europe)
- Head coach: (Romania) David Asandei
- Captain: (Romania) Roxana Ion
- Top scorer: (Romania) -3 Barabási (official competitions) (Romania) -4 Ion (overall)
- FIFA code: ROU
- FIFA ranking: 39 ▼3 (8 May 2026)
Home colours	Away colours

First international
- Romania 5-5 Moldova (Chișinău, Moldova; August 15, 2018)

Biggest win
- Romania 3-2 Moldova (Chișinău, Moldova; August 16, 2018)

Biggest defeat
- Romania 1-12 Spain (Madrid, Spain; September 12, 2018)

The Romania women's futsal team is the national women's futsal team of Romania and is governed by the Romanian Football Federation. Its first two games were in August 2018 against neighboring Moldova, a draw and a win. It first played an official match in the UEFA Women's Futsal Euro 2019 qualifications, Main round, Group 1, where it lost all matches. The team did not play any matches in 2019 or 2020, and it was the only national team that did not enter the UEFA Women's Futsal Euro 2021 qualifications (later rescheduled as UEFA Women's Futsal Euro 2022), despite doing so for the previous edition. The team did not return for UEFA Women's Futsal Euro 2023 qualifications either.

== Results ==
=== FIFA Futsal Women's World Cup ===
FIFA Futsal Women's World Cup record
Year	Round	Position	GP	W	D	L	GS	GA
(Philippines) 2025	Did not enter							
Total	–	0/1	0	0	0	0	0	0

=== UEFA Women's Futsal Championship ===
Ed.	Year	Round	Position in Group	MP	W	D	L	GF	GA	Qualifying Round	Position in Group	MP	W	D	L	GF	GA
1	Portugal 2019	Did not qualify								Main	4th	3	0	0	3	5	24
2	Portugal 2022	Did not enter								Did not enter							
3	TBD 2023	Did not enter								Did not enter							
	Total											3	0	0	3	5	24

== Results at official competitions ==
Friendly matches are not included. Win Draw Loss

Competition	No.	Date and Place	Opponent	Result	Scorers
2019 UEFA Futsal Championship
2019 UEFA Championship; Main round Group 1 Spain
2019 UEFA Championship; Main round Group 1 Spain	1	Sep 12, 2018 Leganés	Spain	1-12	Ion 25:09
2019 UEFA Championship; Main round Group 1 Spain	2	Sep 13, 2018 Leganés	Italy	2-8	Răduc 29:12, Barabási 32:51
2019 UEFA Championship; Main round Group 1 Spain	3	Sep 15, 2018 Leganés	Poland	2-4	Barabási 11:49, 18:23

== Results and fixtures ==
=== 2018 ===
15 August 2018 Friendly	Moldova	5–5	Romania	Chișinău, Moldova
18:00 UTC+02:00	Caraman 13'; Ciobanu 15', 23'; Musteaţă 17'; Prisăcari 40'	Report	Ion 16', 19', 23'; Covaci 32'; Meleaca 37'	Stadium: Complexul Sportiv Alexia

16 August 2018 Friendly	Moldova	2–3	Romania	Chișinău, Moldova
11:00 UTC+02:00	Ciobanu 14'; Prisăcari 39'	Report	Anca 31', 21'; Papp 27'	Stadium: Complexul Sportiv Alexia

12 September 2018 2019 UEFA Futsal EURO Q	Spain	12–1	Romania	Pabellón Europa, Leganés
18:30	Ampi 0:18, 6:55, 21:07, 29:33; Anita 5:16; Mayte 9:28; Sotelo 11:09, 16:44, 24:43, 31:31, 36:26; Campoy 14:26	Report	Ion 25:09	Referee: Irina Velikanova (Russia), Aleš Mocnik Peric (Slovenia)

13 September 2018 2019 UEFA Futsal EURO Q	Romania	2–8	Italy	Pabellón Europa, Leganés
18:00	Răduc 29:12; Barabási 32:51	Report	Da Silva 0:15 (pen.); Belli 5:23; Luciani 11:40; D'Incecco 12:59; Mansueto 20:36; Giuliano 27:19 (pen.), 37:10; Pomposelli 28:21	Referee: Marjan Mladenovsk (Macedonia), Irina Velikanova (Russia)

15 September 2018 2019 UEFA Futsal EURO Q	Poland	4–2	Romania	Pabellón Europa, Leganés
16:30	Włodarczyk 8:51; Lichtenstein 14:48, 19:58; Zajaç 15:34	Report	Barabási 11:49, 18:23	Referee: Irina Velikanova (Russia), Marjan Mladenovski (Macedonia)

== Squads ==
The squad called up for training and EURO qualifiers played in 2018 consisted of 14 players.

Coach: (Romania) David Asandei

No.	Pos.	Player	Date of birth (age)	Caps	Goals	Club
	GK	Sabina Radu				(Italian Football Federation) Chiaravale Fiber Pasta (futsal)
	GK	Mirela Abălașei	30 August 1978 (aged 39)			(Romanian Football Federation) FC Universitatea Galați (football)
		Lucia Meleaca	5 December 1991 (aged 26)			(Romanian Football Federation) CSM Târgu Mureș (football)
		Mihaela Merlan	25 October 1995 (aged 22)			(Romanian Football Federation) Heniu Prundu Bârgăului (football)
		Nina Anca	27 April 1988 (aged 30)			(Romanian Football Federation) Fair Play București (football)
		Valentina Petre	26 February 1998 (aged 20)			(Romanian Football Federation) Fair Play București (football)
		Roxana Ion				(Italian Football Federation) Italcave Real State (futsal)
		Maria Stamate	22 June 1999 (aged 19)			(Romanian Football Federation) Universitatea Galați (football)
		Antonia Covaci	7 December 2000 (aged 17)			(Portuguese Football Federation) Sporting Lisbon (youth futsal)
		Monica Bențoiu	10 December 1996 (aged 21)			(Romanian Football Federation) Universitatea Galați (football)
		Lidia Moacă	1 April 1995 (aged 23)			(Romanian Football Federation) Universitatea Galați (football)
		Elena Răduc	31 August 1995 (aged 22)			(Romanian Football Federation) Universitatea Galați (football)
		Kinga Barabási	31 January 1997 (aged 21)			(Romanian Football Federation) Vasas Femina Odorheiu Secuiesc (football)
		Szidónia Papp				(Romanian Football Federation) Heniu Prundu Bârgăului (football)
