= Fatma Özlem Tursun =

Turkish footballer and referee

Personal information
- Date of birth: March 29, 1988 (age 38)
- Place of birth: İzmir, Turkey

Senior career*
Years	Team	Apps	(Gls)
2008–2011	Konak Belediyespor	44	(2)
Total		44	(2)
- * Club domestic league appearances and goals

Fatma Özlem Tursun
Domestic
Years	League	Role
2014–	Regional Boys' U-14 League	referee
2014–	Women's Third League	referee
2015–	Women's First League	referee

Fatma Özlem Tursun (born March 29, 1988) is a Turkish female football referee and former women's footballer.

== Sports career ==
=== Player ===
Fatma Özlem Tursun began her playing career in her hometown club Konak Belediyespor in the 2008–09 season after obtaining her license on October 27, 2010. She appeared in 44 matches of the First League and scored two goals until the end of the 2010–11 season.

== Referee ==
Tursun began her referee career debuting in the Regional Boys under-17 Development League on October 27, 2013, as fourth official.

On November 10, 2013, she was appointed to officiate a Women's Second League match as second assistant referee. She was also in charge of first and second assistant referee roles in various regional leagues for the age categories of boys' U-14, U-15, U-16, U-17 and men's U-19, U-21 and Turkish Regional Amateur League as well as in Women's Third and Second League.

She debuted as referee in a regional boys' U-14 league match on March 8, 2014. After officiating matches as referee in the regional boys' U-15 league and Women's Third League, Tursun was tasked in a ||Women's First League match of the 2015–16 season on November 7, 2015.

In November 2015, Tursun was nominated by the Turkish Football Federation a FIFA listed official for international futsal matches in 2016.

== Player career statistics ==
As of match played May 1, 2011

Club	Season	League			Continental		National		Total	
Club	Season	Division	Apps	Goals	Apps	Goals	Apps	Goals	Apps	Goals
Konak Belediyespor	2008–09	First League	14	1	–	-	0	0	14	1
Konak Belediyespor	2009–10	First League	17	0	–	-	0	0	17	0
Konak Belediyespor	2010–11	First League	13	1	–	-	0	0	13	1
Konak Belediyespor	Total		44	2	–	–	0	0	44	2
Career total			44	2	–	–	0	0	44	2

== Honours ==
Turkish Women's First League

Konak Belediyespor
Runners-up (1): 2010–11
