= Northern Ireland women's national futsal team =

National woman's association futsal team

Northern Ireland
- Association: Irish Football Association
- Confederation: UEFA (Europe)
- FIFA code: NIR
- FIFA ranking: 61 ▲1 (12 December 2025)

First international
- Northern Ireland 3–4 Belgium (Newry, Northern Ireland, 21 August 2018)

Biggest win
- Gibraltar 0–3 Northern Ireland (Gibraltar, 6 April 2019); Latvia 1–4 Northern Ireland ( Vrnjačka Banja, Serbia, 14 May 2022)

Biggest defeat
- Northern Ireland 0–12 France (Podčetrtek, Slovenia; 19 March 2026)

UEFA Women's Futsal Championship
- Appearances: 0 (Preliminary round only)

The Northern Ireland women's national futsal team represents Northern Ireland in international women's futsal competitions and is controlled by the Irish Football Association. Northern Ireland is the first home nation of the United Kingdom to have an active women's futsal team.

== History ==
Northern Ireland's team was formed in 2018. The team would play their first ever match against the Banbridge Town's men's development team on 15 April 2018 which ended in a 4–6 defeat. The team has taken part in the preliminary round of the UEFA Women's Futsal Championship, debuting in 2018 for the 2019 edition.

== Tournament records ==
=== FIFA Futsal Women's World Cup ===
FIFA Futsal Women's World Cup record
Year	Round	Position	GP	W	D	L	GS	GA
(Philippines) 2025	Did not qualify							
Total	–	0/1	0	0	0	0	0	0

=== UEFA European Championship ===
UEFA European Championship								Qualification record					
Year	Round	Pld	W	D	L	GF	GA	Pld	W	D	L	GF	GA
(Portugal) 2019	Did not qualify							3	0	0	3	8	16
(Portugal) 2022	Did not qualify							3	1	0	2	2	12
(Hungary) 2023	Did not qualify							3	1	0	2	5	5
Total	0/3	0	0	0	0	0	0	9	2	0	7	15	33

== Friendlies ==
=== 2019 ===
6 April 2019 Friendly	Gibraltar	0–3	Northern Ireland	Gibraltar
		Report		Stadium: Tercentenary Sports Hall

7 April 2019 Friendly	Gibraltar	2–3	Northern Ireland	Gibraltar
		Report		Stadium: Tercentenary Sports Hall
