= Nikolina Milović =

Bosnian footballer (born 2000)

Personal information
- Date of birth: 11 April 2000 (age 26)
- Position: Forward

Team information
- Current team: Giresun Sanayi
- Number: 92

Senior career*
Years	Team	Apps	(Gls)
2019–2024	Crvena Zvezda		
2025	Krylia Sovetov Samara		
2025–	Giresun Sanayi	1	(0)

International career^{‡}
- Bosnia and Herzegovina
- * Club domestic league appearances and goals as of 28 September 2025 ‡ National team caps and goals as of 19:28, 30 August 2019 (UTC)

Nikolina Milović (born 11 April 2000) is a Bosnian footballer who plays as a forward for Giresun Sanayi in the Turkish Super League, and has appeared for the Bosnia and Herzegovina women's national team.

== Club career ==
From 2019 on, Milović played in the Serbian League for the Belgrade-based club Crvena Zvezda.

In the beginning of 2025, she went to Russia, and signed a two-year deal with Krylia Sovetov Samara.

In September 2025 however, she moved to Turkey, and signed with Giresun Sanayi, which was recently promoted to the Turkish Super League.

== International career ==
Milović has been capped for the Bosnia and Herzegovina national team for two years, appearing for the team during the 2019 FIFA Women's World Cup qualifying cycle.

== Honours ==
Serbian Women's Super League

Crvena Zvezda,
Champions (1): 2023-24
Runners-up (2): 2021–22, 2022-23
