= UEFA Women's Futsal Euro 2022 =

Tournament details
- Host country: Final tournament: Portugal
- City: Gondomar
- Dates: Qualifying rounds: 5 May – 22 October 2021; Final tournament: 1–3 July 2022
- Teams: Final tournament: 4 Qualifying: 24 (from 1 confederation)
- Venue: Final tournament: 1 (in 1 host city)

Final positions
- Champions: Spain
- Runners-up: Portugal
- Third place: Ukraine
- Fourth place: Hungary

The 2022 UEFA Women's Futsal Championship, also referred to as UEFA Women's Futsal Euro 2022, was the second edition of the UEFA Women's Futsal Championship, the biennial international futsal championship organised by UEFA for the women's national teams of Europe.

The final tournament of this edition would originally be held in February 2021, with the qualifying rounds originally taking place in 2020. However, on 17 June 2020, UEFA announced that the final tournament had been postponed to March 2022, with the qualifying rounds postponed to 2021, due to the COVID-19 pandemic. The tournament was again later rescheduled for July 2022 in the same venue previously chosen, Gondomar, Portugal. Spain were the defending champions and they successfully defended their title beating Portugal for a second time 3–3 (1–4 in penalties).

== Teams ==
A total of 24 (out of 55) UEFA member national teams entered the qualifying stage, with Gibraltar and Bosnia and Herzegovina making their debuts. Based on their coefficient ranking, calculated based on results in the 2019 edition, the 13 highest-ranked teams entered the main round, while the 11 lowest-ranked teams entered the preliminary round. The coefficient ranking was also used for seeding in the preliminary round and main round draws, where each team was assigned a seeding position according to their ranking for the respective draw. Three teams were pre-selected as hosts for the preliminary round and four teams were pre-selected as hosts for the main round.

The draws for the preliminary round and main round was held on 13 February 2020, 13:30 CEST (UTC+2), at the UEFA headquarters in Nyon, Switzerland. The mechanism of the draws for each round was as follows:

- In the preliminary round, the 11 teams were drawn into three groups: two groups of four containing one team from each of the seeding positions 1–4, and one group of three containing one team from each of the seeding positions 1–3. First, the three teams which were pre-selected as hosts were drawn from their own designated pot and allocated to their respective group as per their seeding positions. Next, the remaining eight teams were drawn from their respective pot which were allocated according to their seeding positions (the lowest-ranked teams were allocated first to seeding position 4, then seeding position 3).
- In the main round, the 16 teams were drawn into four groups of four, containing one team from each of the seeding positions 1–4. First, the four teams which were pre-selected as hosts were drawn from their own designated pot and allocated to their respective group as per their seeding positions. Next, the remaining 12 teams were drawn from their respective pot which were allocated according to their seeding positions (including the three preliminary round winners, whose identity was not known at the time of the draw, which were allocated to seeding position 4). Based on the decisions taken by the UEFA Emergency Panel, Spain and Gibraltar could not be drawn in the same group. Should Gibraltar qualify for the main round, and were drawn into the same group as Spain, they would be swapped with the relevant team from the next available group.

Participating teams for UEFA Women's Futsal Euro 2022

Teams entering main round
Team	Coeff.	Rank	Seed
**Spain**	10.000	1	1
**Portugal**	8.000	2	1
**Russia**	5.667	3	1
**Ukraine** **(H)**	5.667	4	1
Hungary	2.667	5	2
Finland	2.333	6	2
Italy	2.333	7	2
Croatia **(H)**	2.333	8	2
Sweden **(H)**	2.000	9	3
Czech Republic	1.667	10	3
Poland	1.667	11	3
Belarus **(H)**	1.417	12	3
Slovenia	1.000	13	4

Teams entering preliminary round
Team	Coeff.	Rank	Seed
Kazakhstan	1.000	15	1
Serbia	1.000	16	1
Netherlands	0.500	17	1
Armenia	0.500	18	2
Belgium	0.500	19	2
Lithuania **(H)**	0.250	20	2
Slovakia	0.250	21	3 or 4
Moldova **(H)**	0.250	22	3 or 4
Northern Ireland	0.000	23	3 or 4
Bosnia and Herzegovina	—	—	3 or 4
Gibraltar **(H)**	—	—	3 or 4

Notes

- Teams marked in **bold** have qualified for the final tournament.
- (H): Teams pre-selected as hosts for the preliminary round and the main round
- Romania (Coeff. 1.000, Rank 14) are the only team to participate in 2019 qualifying but not in 2022 qualifying.

== Format ==
In the preliminary round and main round, each group is played as a round-robin mini-tournament at the pre-selected hosts.

In the final tournament, the four qualified teams play in knockout format (semi-finals, third place match, and final), either at a host selected by UEFA from one of the teams, or at a neutral venue.

=== Tiebreakers ===
In the preliminary round and main round, teams are ranked according to points (3 points for a win, 1 point for a draw, 0 points for a loss), and if tied on points, the following tiebreaking criteria are applied, in the order given, to determine the rankings (Regulations Articles 14.01 and 14.02):

1. Points in head-to-head matches among tied teams;
2. Goal difference in head-to-head matches among tied teams;
3. Goals scored in head-to-head matches among tied teams;
4. If more than two teams are tied, and after applying all head-to-head criteria above, a subset of teams are still tied, all head-to-head criteria above are reapplied exclusively to this subset of teams;
5. Goal difference in all group matches;
6. Goals scored in all group matches;
7. Penalty shoot-out if only two teams have the same number of points, and they met in the last round of the group and are tied after applying all criteria above (not used if more than two teams have the same number of points, or if their rankings are not relevant for qualification for the next stage);
8. Disciplinary points (red card = 3 points, yellow card = 1 point, expulsion for two yellow cards in one match = 3 points);
9. UEFA coefficient ranking;
10. Drawing of lots.

== Schedule ==
The schedule of the competition was as follows.

Schedule for UEFA Women's Futsal Euro 2022
Round	Draw	Dates	Original dates
Preliminary round	13 February 2020	4–9 May 2021	5–10 May 2020
Main round	13 February 2020	19–24 October 2021	1–6 September 2020
Final tournament	28 January 2022	Semi-finals: 25 March 2022; Third place match & Final: 27 March 2022	Semi-finals: 11 or 12 February 2021; Third place match & Final: originally 13 or 14 February 2021

In the preliminary round and main round, the schedule of each group was as follows, with one rest day between matchdays 2 and 3 for four-team groups, and no rest days for three-team groups (Regulations Articles 18.04, 18.05 and 18.06):

Note: For scheduling, the hosts are considered as Team 1, while the visiting teams are considered as Team 2, Team 3, and Team 4 according to their seeding positions.

Group schedule
Matchday	Matches (4 teams)	Matches (3 teams)
Matchday 1	2 v 4, 3 v 1	3 v 1
Matchday 2	3 v 2, 1 v 4	2 v 3
Matchday 3	4 v 3, 1 v 2	1 v 2

== Preliminary round ==
The winners of each group advance to the main round to join the 13 teams which receive byes. The preliminary round was originally scheduled to be played between 5 and 10 May 2020, but had been postponed due to the COVID-19 pandemic, initially to a later date comprised tentatively between June and September. On 17 June 2020, UEFA announced that the matches had been rescheduled to be played between 4 and 9 May 2021.

Times are CEST (UTC+2), as listed by UEFA (local times, if different, are in parentheses).

=== Group A ===
Pos	Team	Pld	W	D	L	GF	GA	GD	Pts	Qualification
1	Slovakia	3	3	0	0	18	2	+16	9	Main round
2	Serbia	3	2	0	1	16	5	+11	6	
3	Northern Ireland	3	1	0	2	2	12	−10	3	
4	Lithuania (H)	3	0	0	3	1	18	−17	0	

Source: UEFA
Rules for classification: Tiebreakers
(H) Hosts
5 May 2021
15:00 (16:00 EEST)

Serbia	4–1	Northern Ireland
Brown 23:55 (o.g.); Knežević 27:53; Vuković 35:51; Mearns 39:55 (o.g.)	Report	Dempster 8:14

Jonava Sports Arena, Jonava
Referee: Volha Pauliuts (Belarus), Raquel Gonzalez Ruano (Spain), Tatiana Boltneva (Russia)
5 May 2021
17:30 (18:30 EEST)

Slovakia	7–0	Lithuania
Rybanská 1:49, 17:07; Valová 9:40; Macková 25:16, 26:09; Tyčiaková 28:45, 36:07	Report

Jonava Sports Arena, Jonava
Referee: Irina Velikanova (Russia), Tatiana Boltneva (Russia), Raquel Gonzalez Ruano (Spain)

6 May 2021
15:00 (16:00 EEST)

Slovakia	3–2	Serbia
Tyčiaková 14:14, 26:05; Sedláková 18:44	Report	Knežević 12:33, 15:36

Jonava Sports Arena, Jonava
Referee: Raquel Gonzalez Ruano (Spain), Irina Velikanova (Russia), Volha Pauliuts (Belarus)
6 May 2021
17:30 (18:30 EEST)

Lithuania	0–1	Northern Ireland
	Report	Brown 22:57

Jonava Sports Arena, Jonava
Referee: Tatiana Boltneva (Russia), Volha Pauliuts (Belarus), Irina Velikanova (Russia)

8 May 2021
11:30 (12:30 EEST)

Northern Ireland	0–8	Slovakia
	Report	Tyčiaková 1:25; Baniková 4:27; Kucharčíková 18:50; Macková 20:18; Rybanská 21:39, 21:57, 32:49; Valová 29:39

Jonava Sports Arena, Jonava
Referee: Irina Velikanova (Russia), Tatiana Boltneva (Russia), Raquel Gonzalez Ruano (Spain)
8 May 2021
14:00 (15:00 EEST)

Lithuania	1–10	Serbia
Liužinaitė 15:59	Report	Malijar 7:10; Batinić 13:25, 14:30, 26:01, 28:38, 28:58; Čolić 19:40; Trišić 24:07, 34:09, 39:55

Jonava Sports Arena, Jonava
Referee: Raquel Gonzalez Ruano (Spain), Tatiana Boltneva (Russia), Irina Velikanova (Russia)

=== Group B ===
Pos	Team	Pld	W	D	L	GF	GA	GD	Pts	Qualification
1	Netherlands	3	3	0	0	21	3	+18	9	Main round
2	Armenia	3	2	0	1	12	8	+4	6	
3	Bosnia and Herzegovina	3	1	0	2	8	11	−3	3	
4	Moldova (H)	3	0	0	3	0	19	−19	0	

Source: UEFA
Rules for classification: Tiebreakers
(H) Hosts
16 August 2021
15:00 (16:00 EEST)

Netherlands	7–3	Bosnia and Herzegovina
Van Toledo 5:06, 14:19, 19:56; Prijs 5:35; De Groen 17:20; Alibašić 26:54 (o.g.); Veltrop 29:43	Report	Spasojević 8:42; Trumić 34:11; Milović 37:54 (pen.)

FMF Futsal Arena, Ciorescu
Referee: Talgat Kosmukhambetov (Kazakhstan), Fatma Özlem Tursun (Turkey), Volha Pauliuts (Belarus)
16 August 2021
17:30 (18:30 EEST)

Armenia	8–0	Moldova
Osipyan 12:06, 17:56; Mangasaryan 14:03; Costico 16:21 (o.g.); Ghukasyan 26:06, 32:54; Osadcii 27:53 (o.g.); Chopikyan 36:24	Report

Futsal Arena FMF, Ciorescu
Referee: Šarūnas Tamulynas (Lithuania), Volha Pauliuts (Belarus), Fatma Özlem Tursun (Turkey)

17 August 2021
15:00 (16:00 EEST)

Armenia	0–6	Netherlands
	Report	Brueren 9:07; Oliveira 9:57; Verschoor 27:00; Prijs 30:29; Veltrop 32:13; De Groen 38:26

FMF Futsal Arena, Ciorescu
Referee: Fatma Özlem Tursun (Turkey), Šarūnas Tamulynas (Lithuania), Talgat Kosmukhambetov (Kazakhstan)
17 August 2021
17:30 (18:30 EEST)

Moldova	0–3	Bosnia and Herzegovina
	Report	Spasojević 0:28; Trumić 4:10; Milović 38:11

FMF Futsal Arena, Ciorescu
Referee: Volha Pauliuts (Belarus), Talgat Kosmukhambetov (Kazakhstan), Šarūnas Tamulynas (Lithuania)

19 August 2021
15:00 (16:00 EEST)

Bosnia and Herzegovina	2–4	Armenia
Milović 1:12; Ann. Karapetyan 39:27 (o.g.)	Report	Yeghyan 5:33, 18:58, 26:25; Osipyan 14:20 (2pen.)

FMF Futsal Arena, Ciorescu
Referee: Volha Pauliuts (Belarus), Šarūnas Tamulynas (Lithuania), Talgat Kosmukhambetov (Kazakhstan)
19 August 2021
17:30 (18:30 EEST)

Moldova	0–8	Netherlands
	Report	Verschoor 7:44; Loth 15:46; Van Toledo 17:06, 36:10; Oliveira 18:54, 33:35; Hopman 28:50, 29:50

FMF Futsal Arena, Ciorescu
Referee: Fatma Özlem Tursun (Turkey), Talgat Kosmukhambetov (Kazakhstan), Šarūnas Tamulynas (Lithuania)

=== Group C ===
Pos	Team	Pld	W	D	L	GF	GA	GD	Pts	Qualification
1	Belgium	1	0	1	0	3	3	0	1	Main round
2	Gibraltar (H)	1	0	1	0	3	3	0	1	
3	Kazakhstan	0	0	0	0	0	0	0	0	Withdrew

Source: UEFA
Rules for classification: Tiebreakers
(H) Hosts
5 May 2021
18:00

Belgium	3–3 (a.e.t.)	Gibraltar
Van Roie 2:11, 43:24; Taquet 4:29	Report	Viagas 9:52; S. Robba 24:08, 42:33
Penalties
Courtois (penalty scored); Wijns (penalty scored); Van Roie (penalty scored); Meeuwis (penalty missed); Meyers (penalty scored); Rosala (penalty missed); Taquet (penalty scored)	5–4	(penalty scored) Borrell; (penalty missed) Ferro; (penalty missed) Garcia; (penalty scored) Holt; (penalty scored) S. Robba; (penalty scored) Viagas; (penalty missed) Victor

Tercentenary Sports Hall, Gibraltar
Referee: Chiara Perona (Italy), Annamaria Tolnay (Hungary), Filipe Gonçalo Santos Duarte (Portugal)

6 May 2021
18:00

Kazakhstan	Cancelled	Belgium
	Report

Tercentenary Sports Hall, Gibraltar
Referee: Chiara Perona (Italy), Annamaria Tolnay (Hungary), Fatma Özlem Tursun (Turkey)

7 May 2021
18:00

Gibraltar	Cancelled	Kazakhstan
	Report

Tercentenary Sports Hall, Gibraltar

== Main round ==
The winners of each group advance to the final tournament. The main round was originally scheduled to be played between 1 and 6 September 2020. On 17 June 2020, UEFA announced that the matches had been rescheduled to be played between 19 and 24 October 2021.

Times are CEST (UTC+2), as listed by UEFA (local times, if different, are in parentheses).

=== Group 1 ===
Pos	Team	Pld	W	D	L	GF	GA	GD	Pts	Qualification
1	Russia	3	3	0	0	14	1	+13	9	Banned due to the invasion of Ukraine
2	Hungary	3	2	0	1	8	8	0	6	Final tournament
3	Netherlands	3	1	0	2	8	6	+2	3	
4	Belarus (H)	3	0	0	3	5	20	−15	0	

Source: UEFA
Rules for classification: Tiebreakers
(H) Hosts
20 October 2021
14:30 15:30 (FET)

Russia	2–1	Netherlands
Samoilova 0:50; Samorodova 17:06	Report	Barendse 6:34

Sport Palace Uruchie, Minsk
Referee: Aslan Galayev (Kazakhstan)
20 October 2021
17:30 18:30 (FET)

Hungary	5–4	Belarus
Megyeri 0:28, 3:04; Horváth 11:29, 38:23; Fülöp 36:40	Report	Aniskovtseva 5:36, 26:54; Miroshnichenko 29:40; Kharlanova 39:11

Sport Palace Uruchie, Minsk
Referee: Arttu Kyynaeraeinen (Finland)

21 October 2021
14:30 15:30 (FET)

Hungary	0–3	Russia
	Report	Lebedeva 3:13, 22:31; Samoilova 9:01

Sport Palace Uruchie, Minsk
Referee: Jiri Bergs (Belgium)
21 October 2021
17:30 18:30 (FET)

Belarus	1–6	Netherlands
Verschoor 4:14 (2pen.)	Report	Loth 1:00, 37:07; De Groen 2:29; Barendse 3:08; Brueren 15:01; Verschoor 39:02

Sport Palace Uruchie, Minsk
Referee: Mislav Džeko (Croatia)

23 October 2021
10:00 11:00 (FET)

Netherlands	1–3	Hungary
Veltrop 20:38	Report	Csepregi 25:58; Horváth 32:56; Varga 39:29

Sport Palace Uruchie, Minsk
Referee: Jiri Bergs (Belgium)
23 October 2021
12:30 13:30 (FET)

Belarus	0–9	Russia
	Report	Rodkina 3:51; Samoilova 6:28; Gazimova 9:39, 14:09; Samorodova 11:30; Pravdina 33:10; Lebedeva 36:17, 39:09; Nikitina 38:10

Sport Palace Uruchie, Minsk
Referee: Mislav Džeko (Croatia)

=== Group 2 ===
Pos	Team	Pld	W	D	L	GF	GA	GD	Pts	Qualification
1	Portugal	3	3	0	0	29	3	+26	9	Final tournament
2	Poland	3	2	0	1	14	10	+4	6	
3	Croatia (H)	3	1	0	2	4	22	−18	3	
4	Slovenia	3	0	0	3	3	15	−12	0	

Source: UEFA
Rules for classification: Tiebreakers
(H) Hosts
20 October 2021
16:00

Portugal	6–0	Slovenia
Lídia Moreira 5:16; Inês Fernandes 6:16; Ana Pires 28:48; Pisko 30:42; Sara Ferreira 35:52; Cátia Morgado 38:54	Report

Mladost, Karlovac
Referee: Ivo Tsenov (Bulgaria)
20 October 2021
20:00

Poland	5–1	Croatia
Włodarczyk 11:21; Maziarz 12:51; Knysak 27:41, 33:29 (pen.); Bukowska 28:23	Report	Barbir 18:37

Mladost, Karlovac
Referee: Yevhen Hordiienko (Ukraine)

21 October 2021
16:00

Poland	2–7	Portugal
Nowak 11:49; Knysak 34:06	Report	Cátia Morgado 5:33; Ana Pires 11:03, 16:54; Carla Vanessa 11:36, 26:30; Inês Fernandes 22:13; Sara Ferreira 31:52

Mladost, Karlovac
Referee: Florentina Kallaba (Kosovo)
21 October 2021
20:00

Croatia	2–1	Slovenia
Matijevic 24:06; Orešić 25:24	Report	Kranjc 24:33

Mladost, Karlovac
Referee: Péter Zimonyi (Hungary)

23 October 2021
13:00

Slovenia	2–7	Poland
Moskała 17:10 (2pen.); Włodarczyk 30:11 (2pen.)	Report	Szostak 1:57; Sutkowska 7:00; Nowak 8:56, 11:35; Bukowska 9:55; Moskała 11:44; Knysak 38:40

Mladost, Karlovac
Referee: Péter Zimonyi (Hungary)
23 October 2021
16:30

Croatia	1–16	Portugal
Matijevic 16:14 (pen.)	Report	Pisko 3:36, 32:39, 34:10; Matijevic 15:27 (2pen.); Fifó 16:35, 31:34; Janice Silva 16:50; Carla Vanessa 21:51, 24:21, 39:47; Sara Ferreira 24:59, 26:57, 29:33, 38:24; Lídia Moreira 32:57; Ana Azevedo 39:11

Mladost, Karlovac
Referee: Ivo Tsenov (Bulgaria)

=== Group 3 ===
Pos	Team	Pld	W	D	L	GF	GA	GD	Pts	Qualification
1	Ukraine (H)	3	3	0	0	16	5	+11	9	Final tournament
2	Finland	3	2	0	1	7	5	+2	6	
3	Belgium	3	1	0	2	3	10	−7	3	
4	Czech Republic	3	0	0	3	5	11	−6	0	

Source: UEFA
Rules for classification: Tiebreakers
(H) Hosts
21 October 2021
13:00 (14:00 EEST)

Finland	3–0	Belgium
Jokisalo 11:54; Ylikraka 17:01, 32:27	Report

SC Bosko-Arena, Lviv
Referee: Knyaz Amiraslanov (Azerbaijan)
21 October 2021
18:00 (19:00 EEST)

Czech Republic	4–5	Ukraine
Skálová 24:01, 24:33; A. Šturmová 29:02; Soquessa 39:24	Report	Shulha 8:05, 17:43; Hrytsenko 23:38; Sydorenko 27:01, 36:30

SC Bosko-Arena, Lviv
Referee: Farik Keco (Bosnia and Herzegovina)

22 October 2021
13:00 (14:00 EEST)

Czech Republic	1–3	Finland
Plháková 16:46	Report	Herranen 15:44; Jokisalo 23:24; Lauermaa 39:24

SC Bosko-Arena, Lviv
Referee: Rastislav Behancin (Slovakia)
22 October 2021
18:00 (19:00 EEST)

Ukraine	7–0	Belgium
Forsiuk 6:09, 15:54; Sydorenko 17:46; Shulha 25:44; Klipachenko 33:32; Dubytska 33:51, 35:37	Report

SC Bosko-Arena, Lviv
Referee: Aurélien Uzan (France)

24 October 2021
11:00 (12:00 EEST)

Belgium	3–0	Czech Republic
Courtois 15:49; Wielockx 31:28; T. Van Den Bergh 39:14	Report

SC Bosko-Arena, Lviv
Referee: Knyaz Amiraslanov (Azerbaijan)
24 October 2021
16:00 (17:00 EEST)

Ukraine	4–1	Finland
Shulha 18:35, 25:51; Sydorenko 30:08 (pen.); Sagaidachna 38:25	Report	Juntikka 38:51

SC Bosko-Arena, Lviv
Referee: Aurélien Uzan (France)

=== Group 4 ===
Pos	Team	Pld	W	D	L	GF	GA	GD	Pts	Qualification
1	Spain	3	3	0	0	21	2	+19	9	Final tournament
2	Italy	3	2	0	1	15	5	+10	6	
3	Sweden (H)	3	1	0	2	7	13	−6	3	
4	Slovakia	3	0	0	3	6	29	−23	0	

Source: UEFA
Rules for classification: Tiebreakers
(H) Hosts
20 October 2021
15:00

Spain	12–2	Slovakia
Ana Luján 4:36; Laura Córdoba 7:46; Isa García 11:28, 28:37; Ale de Paz 12:58, 31:54; Dany 13:07; Irene Córdoba 16:45, 25:44, 33:46, 39:56; Peque 25:06	Report	Rybanská 34:56; Kucharčíková 35:31

Halmstad Arena, Halmstad
Referee: Nikola Rabrenović (Serbia)
20 October 2021
19:00

Italy	3–2	Sweden
Adamatti 3:22, 19:21; Coppari 17:44	Report	Stegius 21:04, 25:20

Halmstad Arena, Halmstad
Referee: Valentin Ciuplea (Wales)

21 October 2021
15:00

Italy	0–2	Spain
	Report	Dany 9:00; Amelia 36:42

Halmstad Arena, Halmstad
Referee: Arman Alaberkyan (Armenia)
21 October 2021
19:00

Sweden	5–3	Slovakia
Kiryo 4:26; Lundström 9:17; Stegius 17:32, 18:02; Jensen 39:29	Report	Tyčiaková 10:40; Rybanská 23:24; Kucharčíková 37:21

Halmstad Arena, Halmstad
Referee: Mantas Pomeckis (Lithuania)

23 October 2021
13:00

Slovakia	1–12	Italy
Lišková 21:24	Report	Coppari 1:12; Adamatti 1:26, 32:33, 39:49; Barca 1:41; Dal Maz 2:30, 25:03; Grieco 4:12, 4:59, 34:44; Boutimah 9:10, 30:00

Halmstad Arena, Halmstad
Referee: Valentin Ciuplea (Wales)
23 October 2021
17:00

Sweden	0–7	Spain
	Report	Irene Córdoba 0:48, 20:38; Ale de Paz 5:21; Peque 15:40; Isa García 16:50; Amelia 22:32; Dany 33:41

Halmstad Arena, Halmstad
Referee: Nikola Rabrenović (Serbia)

== Final tournament ==
The final tournament was originally scheduled to be played between 11 and 14 February 2021. On 17 June 2020, UEFA announced that the matches had been rescheduled to be played between 24 and 27 March 2022. However, in March 2022, UEFA announced that the finals had been postponed until further notice, the rescheduled dates were later confirmed to be in July 2022.

=== Venue ===
Portugal were selected on 16 December 2021 from the four qualified teams to be the hosts of the final tournament.

=== Qualified teams ===
The following four teams qualified for the final tournament.

Team	Method of qualification	Date of qualification	Previous appearances in final tournament^{1}
~~Russia~~	Main round Group 1 winners	21 October 2021	1 (2019)
Portugal	Main round Group 2 winners	23 October 2021	1 (2019)
Ukraine	Main round Group 3 winners	24 October 2021	1 (2019)
Spain	Main round Group 4 winners	23 October 2021	1 (**2019**)
Hungary	Main round Group 1 runners-up	2 May 2022	0 (debut)

^{1} Bold indicates champions for that year. Italic indicates hosts for that year.

1. Russia originally qualified as a group winner, but on 2 May 2022 UEFA banned all Russian clubs and teams from European competitions due to the invasion of Ukraine. Russia was replaced by Hungary, who finished second in Group 1 of the Main Round, won by Russia.

=== Final draw ===
The draw for the final tournament was held on 28 January during the half-time of the UEFA Futsal Euro 2022 final group match between Portugal and Ukraine. The four teams were drawn into two semi-finals without any restrictions.

=== Squads ===
Each national team have to submit a squad of 14 players, two of whom must be goalkeepers.

=== Bracket ===
In the semi-finals and final, extra time and penalty shoot-out are used to decide the winner if necessary; however, no extra time is used in the third place match (Regulations Article 16.02 and 16.03).

Semi-finals
1 July – Gondomar
**Portugal**	**6**
Hungary	0
1 July – Gondomar
Ukraine	0
**Spain**	**9**

Final
3 July – Gondomar
Portugal	3 (1)
**Spain**	**3 (4)**
Third place match
3 July – Gondomar
Hungary	1
**Ukraine**	**2**

Times are CEST (UTC+2), as listed by UEFA (local times, if different, are in parentheses).

=== Semi-finals ===
1 July 2022
18:00 (17:00 WEST)

Ukraine	0–9	Spain
	Report	Mayte 0:26; Luci 7:32, 27:35; Irene Córdoba 17:26; Peque 18:42; Ale de Paz 27:22; Sanz 30:41; Amelia 31:44; Samper 37:05

Pavilhão Multiusos de Gondomar, Gondomar
Referee: Daniele D'adamo (San Marino), Fatma Özlem Tursun (Turkey), Chiara Perona (Italy)

1 July 2022
22:30 (21:30 WEST)

Portugal	6–0	Hungary
Pisko 12:02; Pedreira 16:35; Fifó 17:03; Folk 22:30 (o.g.); Cátia Morgado 34:41; Lopes Pereira 36:35	Report

Pavilhão Multiusos de Gondomar, Gondomar
Referee: Damian Grabowski (Poland), Florentina Kallaba (Kosovo), Marjan Mladenovski (North Macedonia)

=== Third place match ===
3 July 2022
15:30 (14:30 WEST)

Hungary	1–2	Ukraine
Horváth 38:32	Report	Tytova 8:27; Volovenko 22:53

Pavilhão Multiusos de Gondomar, Gondomar
Referee: Marjan Mladenovski (North Macedonia), Fatma Özlem Tursun (Turkey), Florentina Kallaba (Kosovo)

=== Final ===
3 July 2022
19:00 (18:00 WEST)

Portugal	3–3 (a.e.t.)	Spain
Ana Azevedo 11:08; Pisko 18:22, 48:44	Report	Ale de Paz 19:34, 34:02; Sanz 43:32
Penalties
Ana Azevedo (penalty missed); Vanessa (penalty scored); Pires (penalty missed)	1–4	(penalty scored) Peque; (penalty scored) Amelia; (penalty scored) Mayte; (penalty scored) I. Córdoba

Pavilhão Multiusos de Gondomar, Gondomar
Attendance: 2,620
Referee: Chiara Perona (Italy), Damian Grabowski (Poland), Daniele D'Adamo (San Marino)
