= Gibraltar women's national futsal team =

Gibraltar
- Association: Gibraltar Football Association
- Confederation: UEFA (Europe)
- FIFA code: GIB
- FIFA ranking: 63 ▲2 (12 December 2025)
- Highest FIFA ranking: 65 (May–June 2024)
- Lowest FIFA ranking: 67 (October 2024)

First international
- Gibraltar 0–3 Northern Ireland (Gibraltar; 6 April 2019)

Biggest win
- None

Biggest defeat
- Gibraltar 0–5 Sweden (Gibraltar; 4 and 5 February 2023)

The Gibraltar women's national futsal team represents Gibraltar in international futsal competitions and is controlled by the Gibraltar Football Association, the governing body for football in Gibraltar.

== History ==
Gibraltar held its first set of international matches against Northern Ireland on 6 and 7 April 2019 at the Tercentenary Sports Hall. They lost both matches; 0–3 and 2–3.

Gibraltar's futsal team became the first ever women's national team of the Gibraltar Football Association to take part in an official competition when it hosted a group in the preliminary round of the UEFA Women's Futsal Euro 2022 in April 2021. Kazakhstan withdrew from the group, leaving Belgium as Gibraltar's only opponent. Belgium advances after winning in penalties after drawing 3–3 with Gibraltar in the latter's first competitive UEFA match.

== Tournament records ==
=== FIFA Futsal Women's World Cup ===
FIFA Futsal Women's World Cup record
Year	Round	Position	GP	W	D	L	GS	GA
(Philippines) 2025	Did not enter							
Total	–	0/1	0	0	0	0	0	0

=== UEFA European Championship ===
UEFA European Championship								Qualification record					
Year	Round	Pld	W	D	L	GF	GA	Pld	W	D	L	GF	GA
(Portugal) 2019	Did not exist							Did not exist					
(Portugal) 2022	Did not qualify							1	0	1	0	3	3
(Hungary) 2023	Did not qualify							3	0	1	2	9	13
Total	0/3	0	0	0	0	0	0	0	0	2	2	12	16

== Fixtures and results ==
6 April 2019 Friendly	Gibraltar	0–3	Northern Ireland	Gibraltar
		Report		Stadium: Tercentenary Sports Hall

7 April 2019 Friendly	Gibraltar	2–3	Northern Ireland	Gibraltar
		Report		Stadium: Tercentenary Sports Hall

10 January 2020 Friendly	Northern Ireland	5–1	Gibraltar	Newry, Northern Ireland
		Report

11 January 2020 Friendly	Northern Ireland	4–0	Gibraltar	Newry, Northern Ireland
		Report

5 May 2021 UEFA Women's Futsal Euro 2022 – Preliminary	Belgium	3–3 (a.e.t.) (5–4 p)	Gibraltar	Gibraltar
18:00	Van Roie 2:11, 43:24; Taquet 4:29	Report	Viagas 9:52; S. Robba 24:08, 42:33	Stadium: Tercentenary Sports Hall; Referee: Chiara Perona (Italy), Annamaria Tolnay (Hungary), Filipe Gonçalo Santos Duarte (Portugal)
	Penalties
	Courtois (penalty scored); Wijns (penalty scored); Van Roie (penalty scored); Meeuwis (penalty missed); Meyers (penalty scored); Rosala (penalty missed); Taquet (penalty scored)		(penalty scored) Borrell; (penalty missed) Ferro; (penalty missed) Garcia; (penalty scored) Holt; (penalty scored) S. Robba; (penalty scored) Viagas; (penalty missed) Victor

11 May 2022 UEFA Women's Futsal Euro 2023 – Preliminary	Slovakia	4–2	Gibraltar	Gibraltar
18:00	Valová 3:50, 13:34; Tyčiaková 16:23; Rybanská 20:59	Report	Neale 20:25; Victor 37:24	Stadium: Tercentenary Sports Hall; Attendance: 600; Referee: Annamaria Tolnay (Hungary), Slawomir Steczko (Poland), Daniel Deca (Romania)

12 May 2022 UEFA Women's Futsal Euro 2022 – Preliminary	Gibraltar	3–3	Moldova	Gibraltar
18:00	Victor 12:06; Gilbert 19:59; El-Din 23:40	Report	Ciobanu 12:51, 33:53; Holt 36:30	Stadium: Tercentenary Sports Hall; Attendance: 410; Referee: Daniel Deca (Romania), Annamaria Tolnay (Hungary), Roosa-Maria Karoliina Tuomi (Finland)

14 May 2022 UEFA Women's Futsal Euro 2022 – Preliminary	Gibraltar	4–6	Belgium	Gibraltar
14:00	Gilbert 0:24; El-Din 21:34; Mascarenhas-Olivero 31:39; Karp 33:49	Report	Gomboso 7:16, 16:29, 39:59; Garcia 10:24 (o.g.); Van Den Bergh 22:28; Drumont 34:21	Stadium: Tercentenary Sports Hall; Attendance: 348; Referee: Slawomir Steczko (Poland), Daniel Deca (Romania), Roosa-Maria Karoliina Tuomi (Finland)

4 February 2023 Friendly	Gibraltar	0–5	Sweden	Gibraltar
18:00 UTC+1		Report	Elia 6:20; Kiryo 7:00, 31:36; Rolin 13:09; Jensen 30:26	Stadium: Tercentenary Sports Hall

5 February 2023 Friendly	Gibraltar	0–5	Sweden	Gibraltar
17:00 UTC+1		Report	Jansson; Larsson; Glans; Vaggelyr; (o.g.)	Stadium: Tercentenary Sports Hall
