= Fifó =

Portuguese futsal player

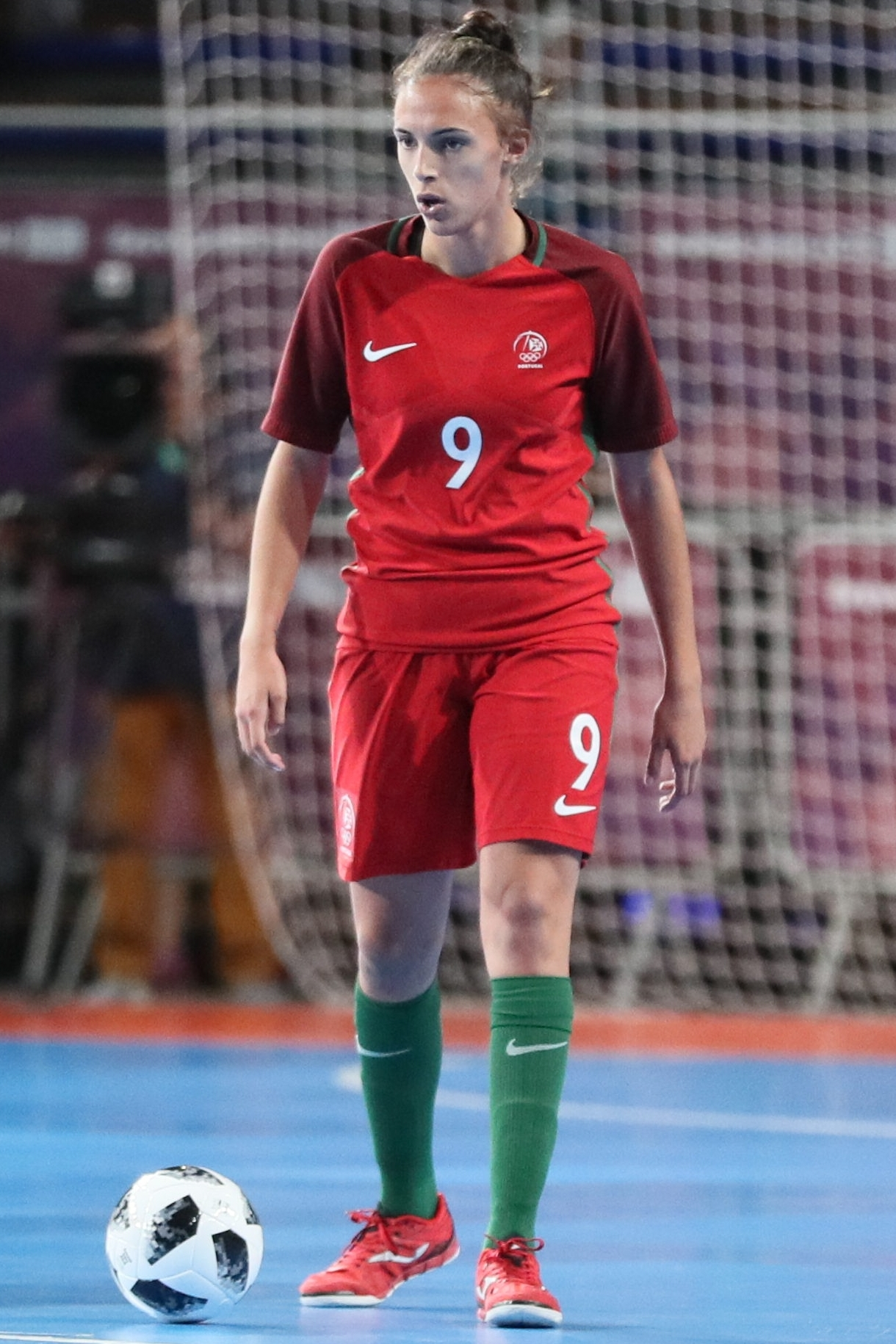
- Fifó at the 2018 Summer Youth Olympics

Personal information
- Full name: Ana Sofia Simões Gonçalves
- Date of birth: 9 August 2000 (age 26)
- Place of birth: Lisbon, Portugal
- Height: 1.72 m (5 ft 8 in)
- Position: Winger

Team information
- Current team: Sport Lisboa e Benfica
- Number: 9

Youth career
- 2014–: Benfica

Senior career*
Years	Team	Apps	(Gls)
2015–2021	Benfica	126	(98)
2021–2022	Città di Falconara	26	(16)
2022-atualmente	S.L. Benfica	11	(9)

International career^{‡}
2018–	Portugal	37	(10)
Medal record
Women's futsal
Representing Portugal
FIFA Futsal Women's World Cup
Runner-up	2025 Philippines
- * Club domestic league appearances and goals as of 10 November 2021 ‡ National team caps and goals as of 10 November 2021

Ana Sofia Simões Gonçalves (born 9 August 2000), also known as Fifó, is a Portuguese futsal player who plays for Sport Lisboa e Benfica and the Portugal women's national team as a winger.

She was also playing for Italian team Città di Falconara from 2021 to 2022.

== International career ==
In 2018, Gonçalves won the gold medal with the Portugal national team at the Summer Youth Olympic Games and was the top scorer of the tournament with 21 goals.

Later on, Gonçalves was nominated for "Best Female Futsal Player in the World" at the 2018 UMBRO Futsal Awards, where she was third.

In 2019, Gonçalves scored three goals for Portugal at the UEFA Women's Futsal Euro, finishing runner-up to Spain.

== Honours ==
Benfica

- Campeonato Nacional Futsal Feminino: 2016–17, 2017–18
- Taça de Portugal de Futsal Feminino: 2015–16, 2016–17, 2017–18
- Supertaça de Futsal Feminino de Portugal: 2016–17, 2017–18

Città di Falconara

- Scudetto: 2021-2022
- Coppa Italia: 2021-2022
- Supercoppa Italiana: 2021

International

- Summer Youth Olympics Gold Medal: 2018
- UEFA Women's Futsal Championship: Runner-up 2019

Individual

- Summer Youth Olympics Top scorer: 2018
- Summer Youth Olympics Best player: 2018
