= Canal 11 (Portugal) =

- Country: Portugal
- Headquarters: City of Football, Oeiras

Ownership
- Owner: Portuguese Football Federation

History
- Launched: 1 August 2019

Links
- Website: Official website

Canal 11 (English: Channel 11) is the television channel of the Portuguese Football Federation. Broadcasts football, beach soccer, futsal and women's football games. It also transmits stories and original content about the Portuguese in the football world, in addition to debates between commentators.

== Coverage ==
=== (Portugal) FPF ===
- National teams
  - Men's and Women's
    - A-team (replays and classic matches)
    - Futsal
    - Beach Soccer
    - Every football and futsal youth teams
  - Algarve Cup
- Supertaça (classic matches only, plus eSports coverage)
- Taça de Portugal (selected live matches that not aired by other main FTA and pay-TV broadcasters, for semi-finals and final will be delayed to protect the cup's main rights holders, as well as classic matches)
- Liga 3
- Campeonato de Portugal
- Liga Revelação - U-23
- Campeonato Nacional Sub-19
- Campeonato Nacional Sub-17 (sporadic matches)
- Campeonato Nacional Sub-15 (sporadic matches)
- Liga BPI
- Taça de Portugal Feminina (except final)
- Taça da Liga Feminina (except final)
- Liga Placard - Futsal National Championship
- Taça de Portugal de Futsal
- Taça da Liga de Futsal
- Supertaça de Futsal
- II Divisão Futsal - 2nd division (sporadic matches)
- Campeonato Nacional Futsal Feminino
- Taça de Portugal de Futsal Feminino
- Taça da Liga de Futsal Feminino - women's futsal league cup
- Supertaça de Futsal Feminino
- Futsal youth competitions (sporadic matches)
- Campeonato de Futebol de Praia
- Varied youth tournaments (men's and women's football and futsal)

=== (Portugal) Non-FPF ===
- Liga Portugal 2 (selected matches not aired by the main rights holders)
- District/Regional cups finals (sporadic matches)

=== outside Portugal ===
- (Europe) UEFA Champions League (early qualification round matches)
- (Europe) UEFA Europa League (selected matches not aired by the main rights holders)
- (Europe) UEFA Europa Conference League (selected matches not aired by the main rights holders)
- (Europe) UEFA Youth League (shared with and sublicensed from Eleven Sports)
- Under-20 Intercontinental Cup
- Africa Cup of Nations
- (United States) National Women's Soccer League
- (Brazil) Série A (excluding Flamengo's home matches)
- (Brazil) Paulistão
- (United States) SheBelieves Cup (formerly)
- AFC Champions League (formerly)
- (Greece) Super League (formerly)
- (Switzerland) Super League (formerly)
- (Poland) Ekstraklasa (formerly)
- (Israel) Ligat ha'Al (formerly)
- (Mexico) Liga MX (formerly)
- (South Korea) K League (formerly)
- (Belarus) Premier League (formerly)
