= Ana Catarina =

Portuguese futsal player

Personal information
- Full name: Ana Catarina Silva Pereira
- Date of birth: 19 November 1992 (age 33)
- Place of birth: Vila Franca de Xira, Portugal
- Height: 1.58 m (5 ft 2 in)
- Position: Goalkeeper

Team information
- Current team: Benfica
- Number: 1

Youth career
- 2004–2005: Vilafranquense
- 2007–2009: Benfica

Senior career*
| Years | Team | Apps | (Gls) |
| 2009–2014 | Benfica | | |
| 2014–2015 | Lazio | | |
| 2015– | Benfica | 93 | (1) |

International career^{‡}
| 2010– | Portugal | 61 | (1) |
Medal record
Women's futsal
Representing Portugal
FIFA Futsal Women's World Cup
| Runner-up | 2025 Philippines |
- * Club domestic league appearances and goals as of 16 August 2019 ‡ National team caps and goals as of 16 August 2019

Ana Catarina Silva Pereira (born 19 November 1992) is a Portuguese futsal goalkeeper who plays for Benfica and the Portugal futsal women's national team. She won the award for Best Goalkeeper in the World on the 2018 Futsal Awards.

== Honours ==
Benfica

- Campeonato Nacional Futsal Feminino: 2016–17, 2017–18, 2018–19
- Taça de Portugal de Futsal Feminino: 2013–14, 2015–16, 2016–17, 2017–18, 2018–19
- Supertaça de Futsal Feminino de Portugal: 2016–17, 2017–18

Lazio

- Supercoppa Italiana: 2014–15

International

- UEFA Women's Futsal Championship runner-up: 2019
- Women's Futsal World Tournament runner-up: 2010, 2012, 2014

Individual

- Best Goalkeeper in the World: 2018
- FIFA Futsal Women's World Cup Golden Glove: 2025
