= Modern pentathlon at the 2018 Summer Youth Olympics – Boys' individual =

Boys' individual at the III Summer Youth Olympic Games
- Venue: Parque Polideportivo Roca
- Dates: 12 and 14 October
- Competitors: 24 from 24 nations

Medalists
1st place, gold medalist(s)		Ahmed Elgendy	Egypt
2nd place, silver medalist(s)		Egor Gromadskii	Russia
3rd place, bronze medalist(s)		Ugo Fleurot	France

These are the results for the boys' individual event at the 2018 Summer Youth Olympics.

== Results ==
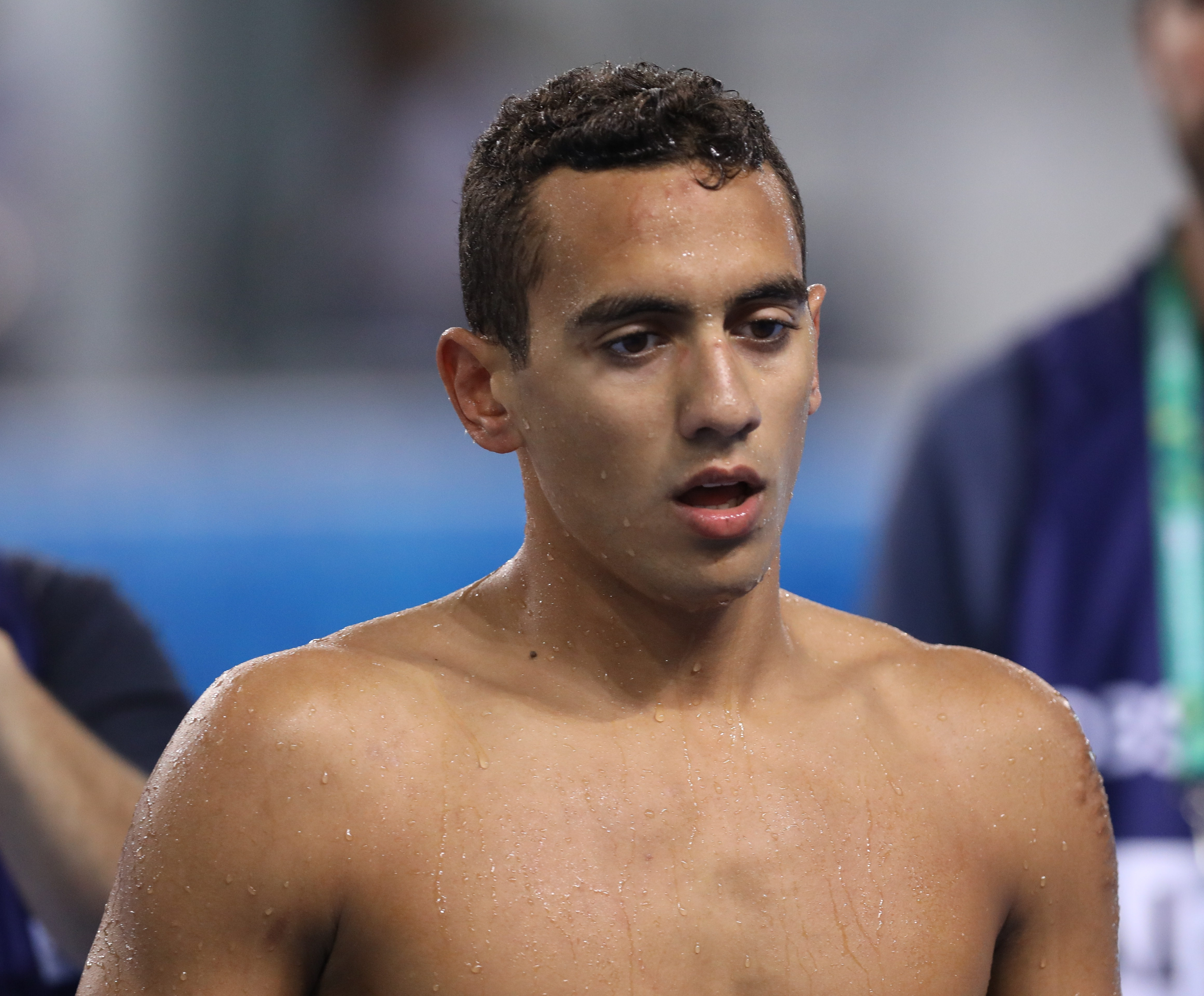
Ahmed Elgendy (Youth Olympic Games Champion)

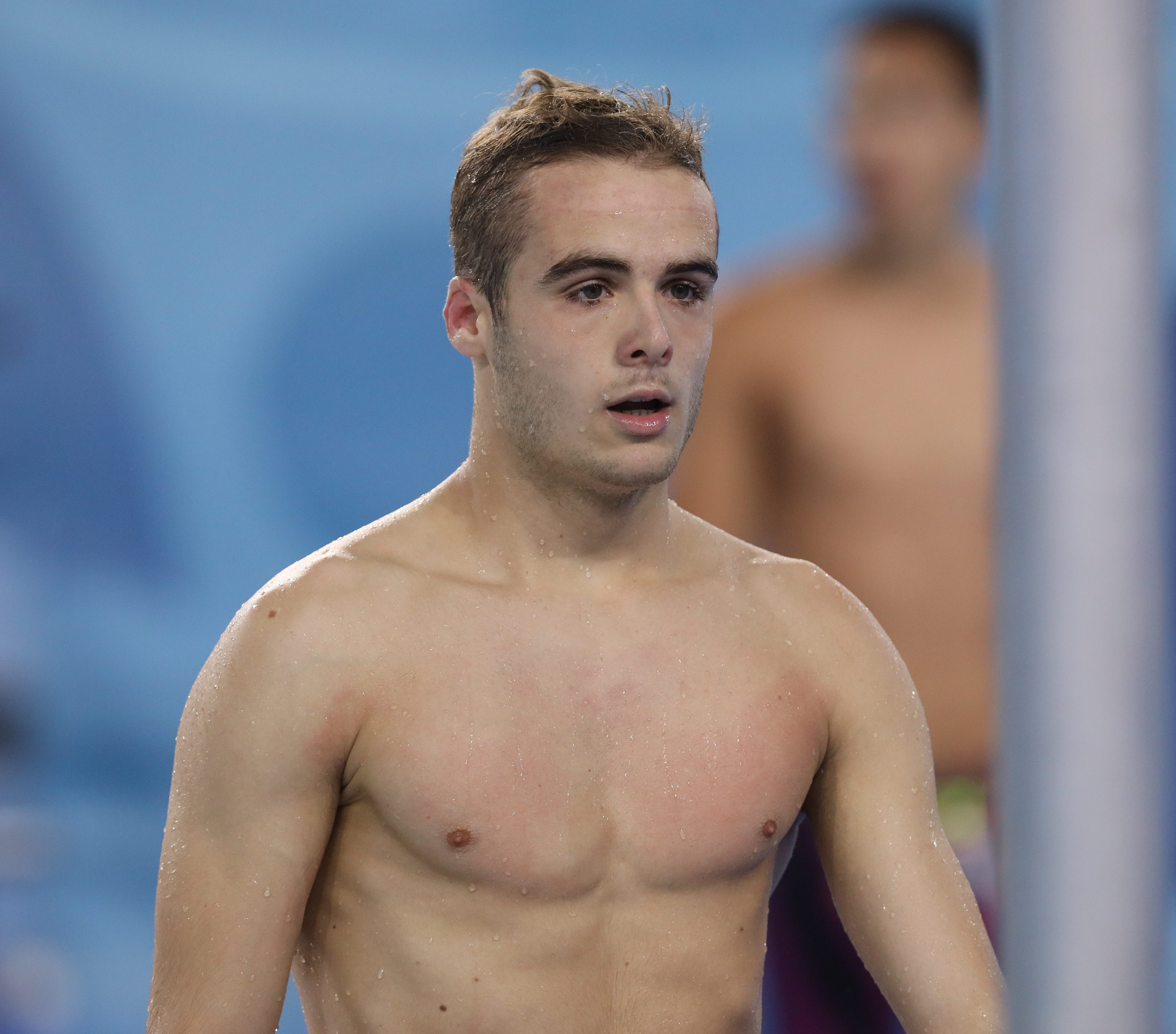
Ugo Fleurot (Bronze medailist)

Rank	Name	Nation	Fencing Ranking Round	Swimming	Fencing Bonus Round	Laser-Run	Total	Notes
1st place, gold medalist(s)	Ahmed Elgendy	Egypt	266	307	2	604	1179	
2nd place, silver medalist(s)	Egor Gromadskii	Russia	266	298	0	595	1159	
3rd place, bronze medalist(s)	Ugo Fleurot	France	218	303	1	622	1144	
4	Pele Uibel	Germany	242	280	0	619	1141	
5	Eduardo Oliveira	Portugal	210	284	3	631	1128	
6	Giorgio Malan	Italy	218	309	0	599	1126	
7	Zhao Zhonghao	China	226	284	0	615	1125	
8	Uladzislau Astrouski	Belarus	234	289	0	594	1117	
9	Kamil Kasperczak	Poland	218	291	5	600	1114	
10	Yevhen Ziborov	Ukraine	250	295	1	560	1106	
11	Sergio Flores	Mexico	202	287	0	606	1095	
12	Dora Nusretoglu	Turkey	234	300	0	550	1084	
13	Aivaras Kazlas	Lithuania	210	298	0	572	1080	
14	Adil Ibragimov	Kazakhstan	194	282	0	600	1076	
15	Franco Serrano	Argentina	202	295	3	576	1076	
16	Alex Vasilianov	Moldova	202	284	0	589	1075	
17	Toby Price	Great Britain	202	288	1	576	1067	
18	Hristo Panayotov	Bulgaria	202	284	2	573	1061	
19	Gaga Khijakadze	Georgia	194	283	0	570	1047	
20	Csaba Bőhm	Hungary	170	302	1	567	1040	
21	Aidar Kenzhebaev	Kyrgyzstan	202	284	0	515	1001	
22	Ángel Hernández	Venezuela	202	258	1	523	984	
23	Rhys Domonic Poovan	South Africa	194	279	3	503	979	
24	Keaan Van Venrooij	Australia	162	297	0	509	968	
