= 2016–17 Campeonato Nacional Futsal (women) =

Campeonato Nacional
- Season: 2016–17
- Champions: S.L. Benfica

The 2016–17 season of the Campeonato Nacional was played by 16 teams. The winners were S.L. Benfica.

== Teams ==
Location of teams in Campeonato Ncional Futsal 2016–17 (Mainland)
Location of teams in Campeonato Ncional Futsal 2016–17 (Azores)

Club	Province	Location	Position in 2016-17
Novasemente	Aveiro	Anta	3
Vermoim	Braga	Vermoim	4
Avintenses	Porto	Vila Nova de Gaia	5
Gondomar	Porto	Rio Tinto	8
Santa Luzia	Viano do Castelo	Viana do Castelo	
Chaves	Vila Real	Chaves	
Lusitania	Aveiro	Lourosa	
Canidelo	Vila do Conde	Macieira da Maia	
S.L. Benfica	Lisbon	Lisbon	1
Sporting CP	Lisbon	São João da Talha	2
Golpilheira	Leiria	Golpilheira	7
Louriçal	Leiria	Louriçal	6
Povoense	Lisbon	Póvoa de Santa Iria	
Del Negro	Lisbon	Amadora	
Quinta dos Lombos	Lisbon	Oeiras	
Posto Santo	Azores	Posto Santo	
