= Gymnastics at the 2018 Summer Youth Olympics – Boys' trampoline =

Boys' trampoline at the III Summer Youth Olympic Games
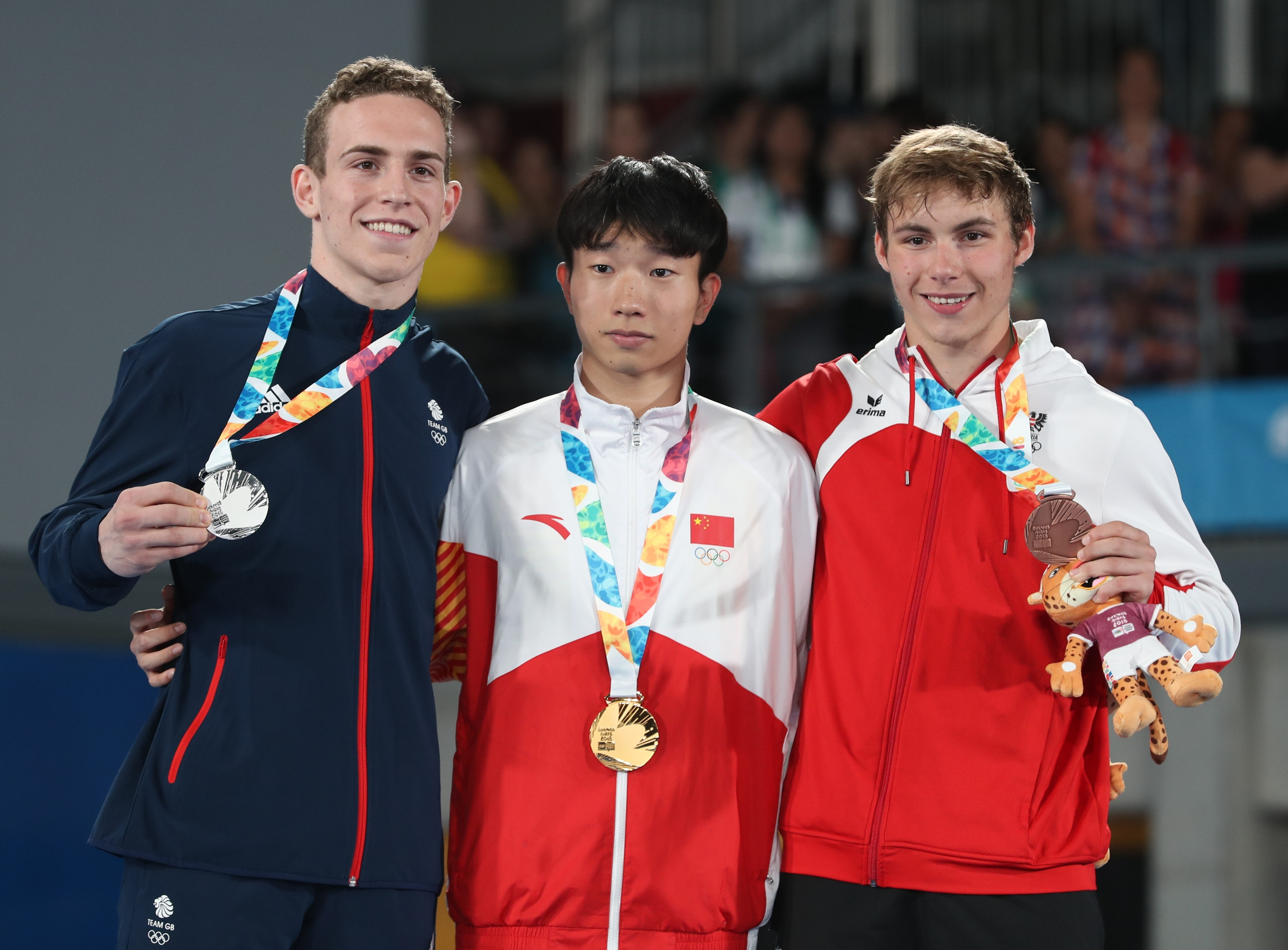
- Victory ceremony (from left to right): Andrew Stamp (Silver), Fu Fantao (Gold), Benny Wizani (Bronze)
- Venue: America Pavilion
- Dates: 8 October (qualification); 14 October (final)
- Competitors: 12 from 12 nations
- Winning score: 58.030

Medalists
1st place, gold medalist(s)		Fu Fantao	China
2nd place, silver medalist(s)		Andrew Stamp	Great Britain
3rd place, bronze medalist(s)		Benny Wizani	Austria

The boys' trampoline competition at the 2018 Summer Youth Olympics was held on 8 and 14 October at the America Pavilion in Buenos Aires, Argentina.

== Results ==
=== Qualification ===
Rank	Athlete	1st Routine		2nd Routine		Total	Notes
Rank	Athlete	Score	Rank	Score	Rank	Total	Notes
1	Ivan Litvinovich (BLR)	48.345	1	60.010	1	108.355	Q
2	Fu Fantao (CHN)	45.490	6	57.420	2	102.910	Q
3	Ruben Tavares (POR)	46.195	2	56.460	3	102.655	Q
4	Benny Wizani (AUT)	45.990	3	56.165	5	102.155	Q
5	Andrew Stamp (GBR)	45.775	5	55.865	7	101.640	Q
6	Robert Vilarasau (ESP)	44.725	7	56.230	4	100.955	Q
7	Nikita Babyonishev (UZB)	44.475	10	56.100	6	100.575	Q
8	Liam Christie (AUS)	44.585	9	55.090	8	99.675	Q
9	Santiago Escallier (ARG)	41.910	12	50.150	9	92.060	R1
10	Noureddine-Younes Belkhir (ALG)	42.005	11	49.960	10	91.965	R2
11	Jérémy Chartier (CAN)	45.890	4	40.410	11	86.300	
12	Takumi Fujimoto (JPN)	44.685	8	6.290	12	50.975	

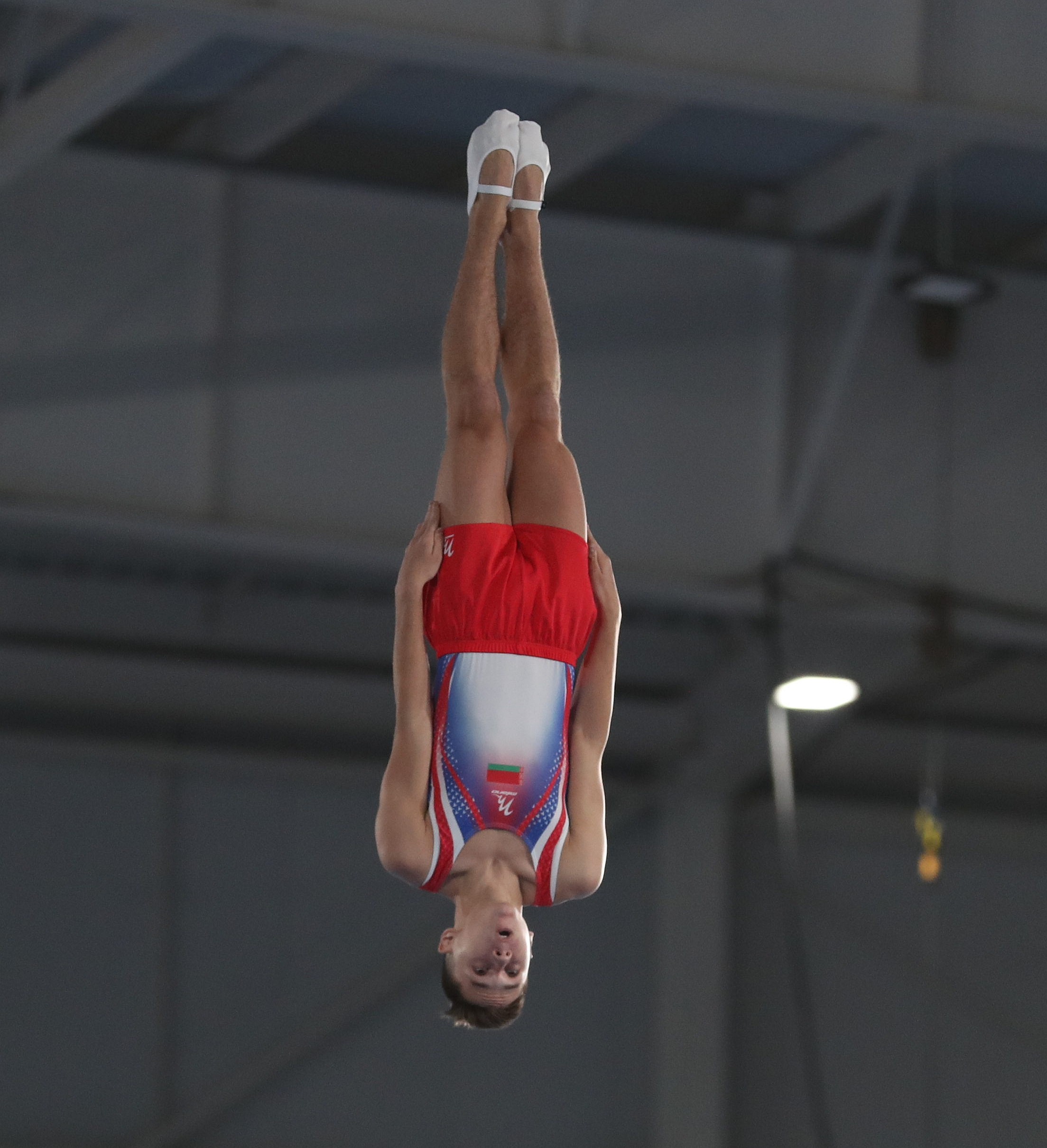
Ivan Litvinovich

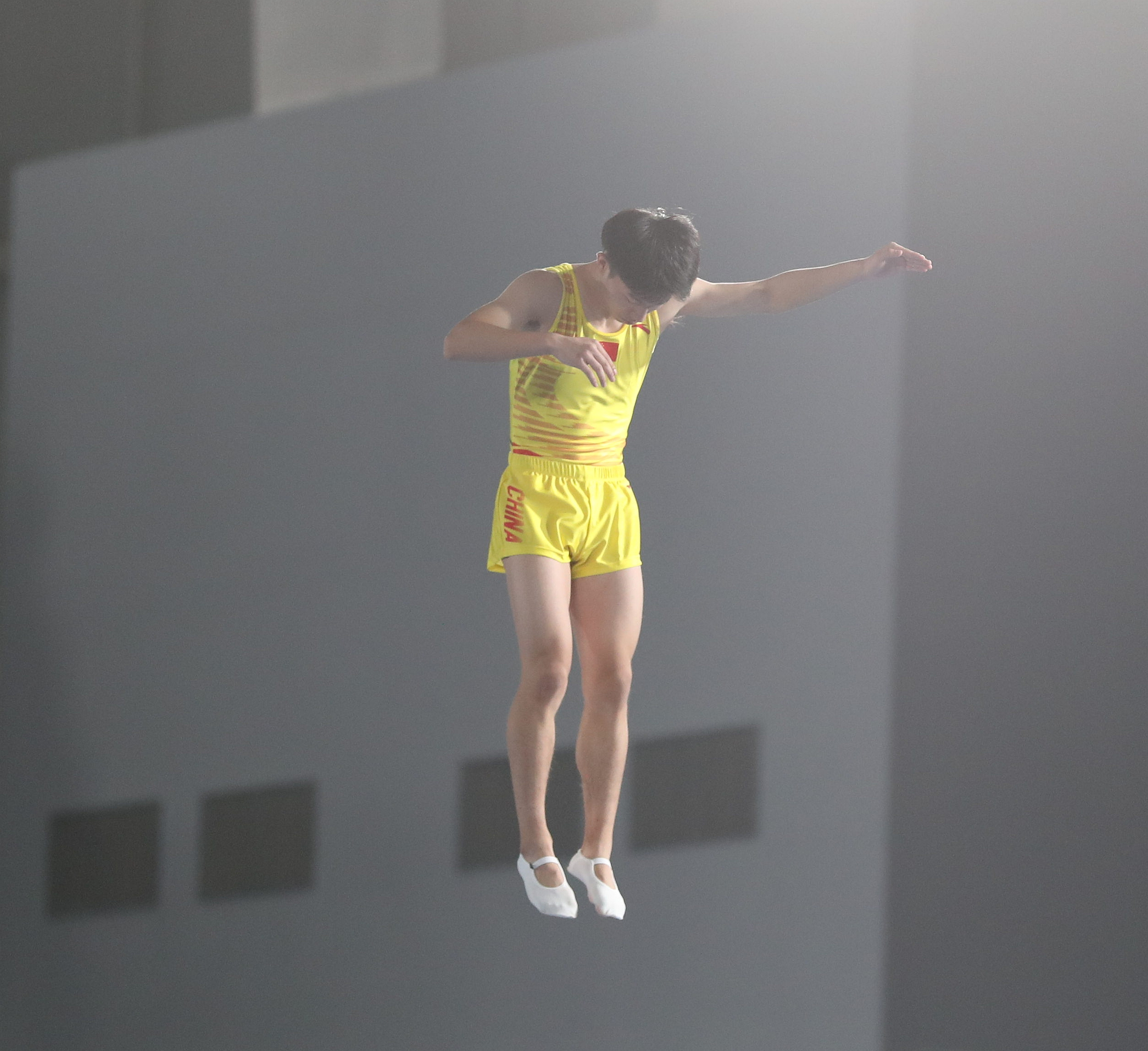
Fu Fantao

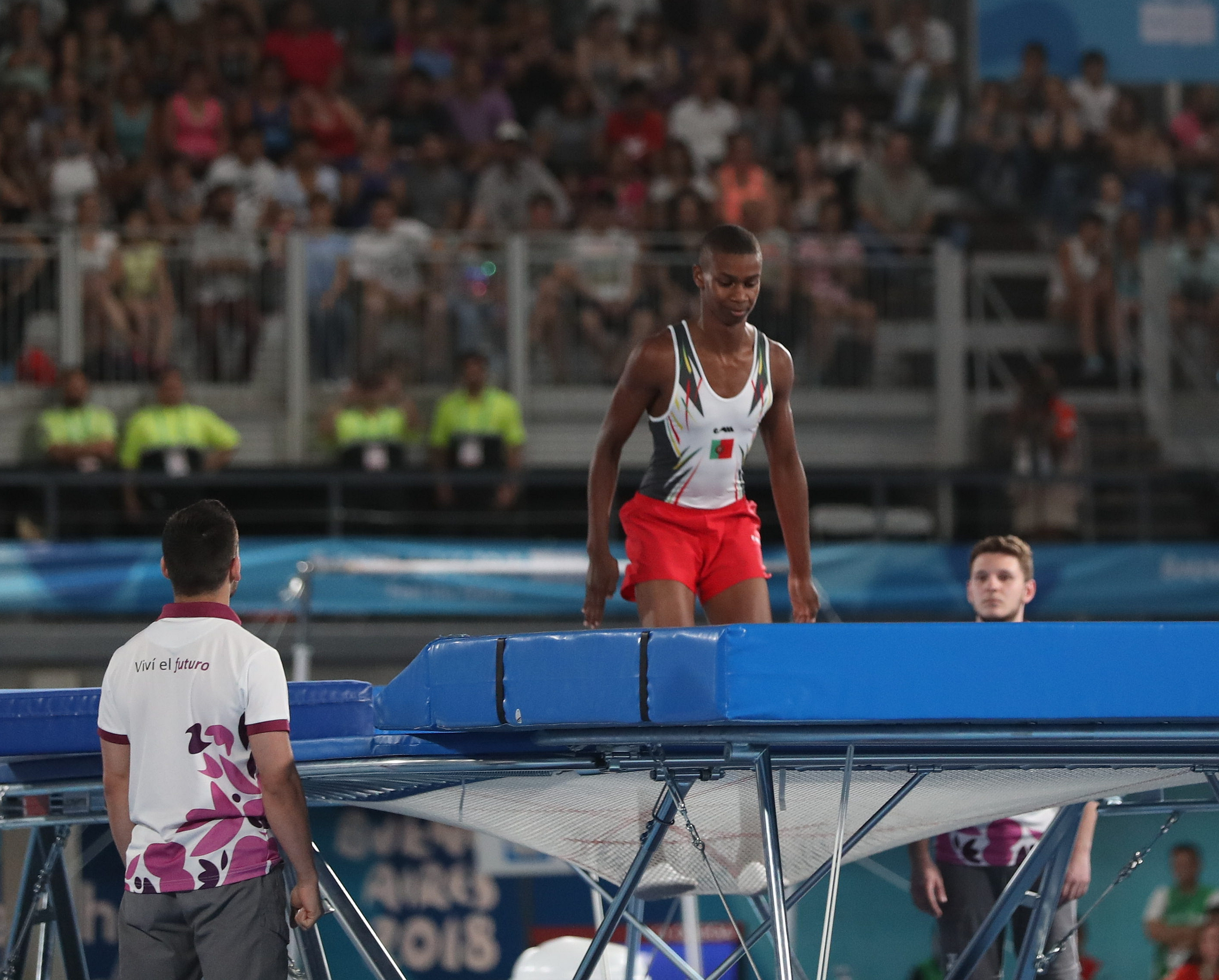
Ruben Tavares

=== Final ===
Rank	Athlete	D Score	E Score	T Score	H Score	Penalty	Total
1st place, gold medalist(s)	Fu Fantao (CHN)	15.400	16.700	16.430	9.500		58.030
2nd place, silver medalist(s)	Andrew Stamp (GBR)	14.800	17.100	16.375	9.200		57.475
3rd place, bronze medalist(s)	Benny Wizani (AUT)	15.000	16.400	17.030	9.000		57.430
4	Ivan Litvinovich (BLR)	15.000	16.200	17.450	8.500		57.150
5	Robert Vilarasau (ESP)	15.000	15.600	16.895	9.500		56.995
6	Ruben Tavares (POR)	14.400	15.900	16.910	9.300		56.510
7	Liam Christie (AUS)	13.500	14.400	15.895	9.200		52.995
8	Nikita Babyonishev (UZB)	15.100	12.600	15.690	8.800		52.190

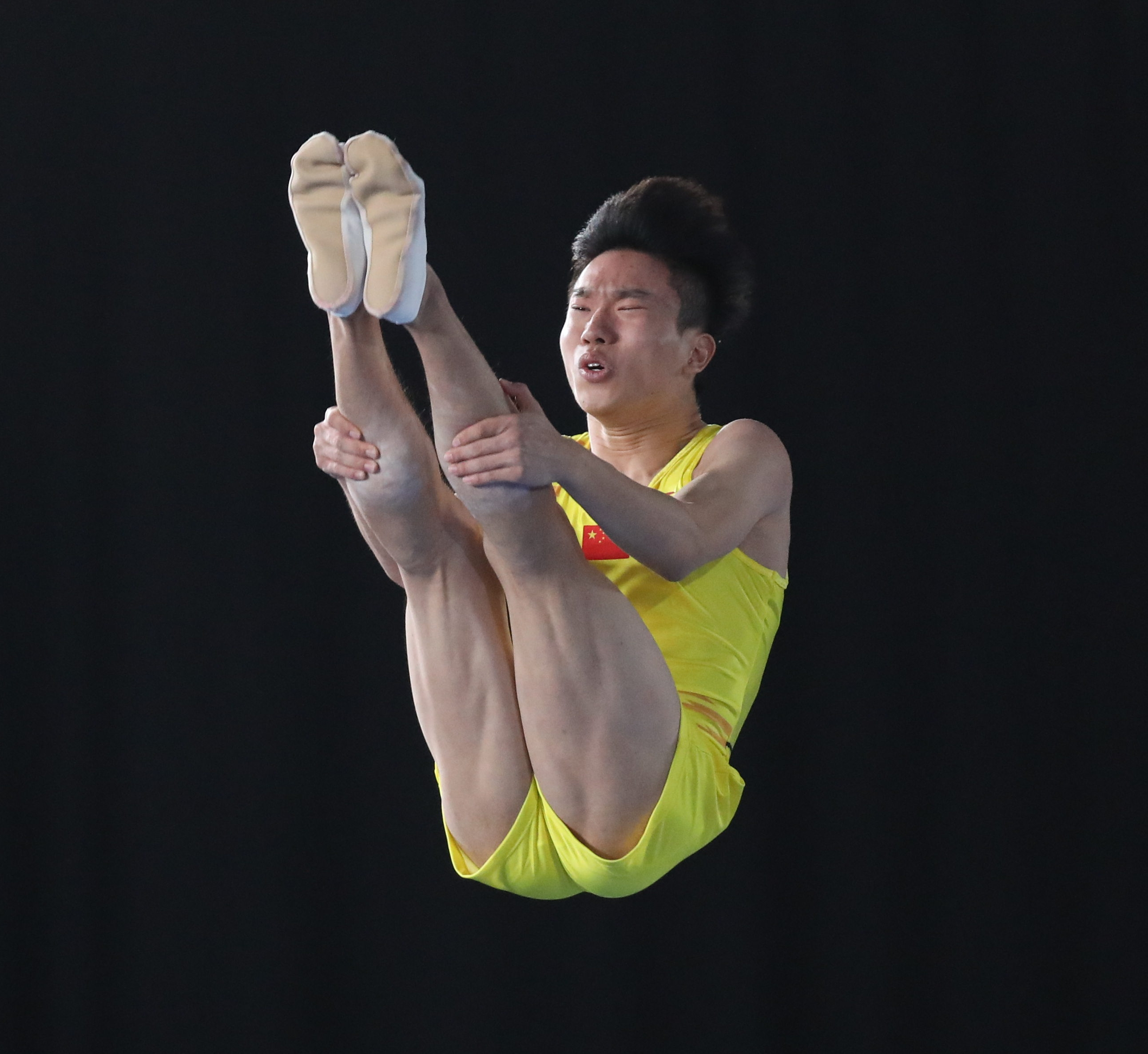
Fu Fantao

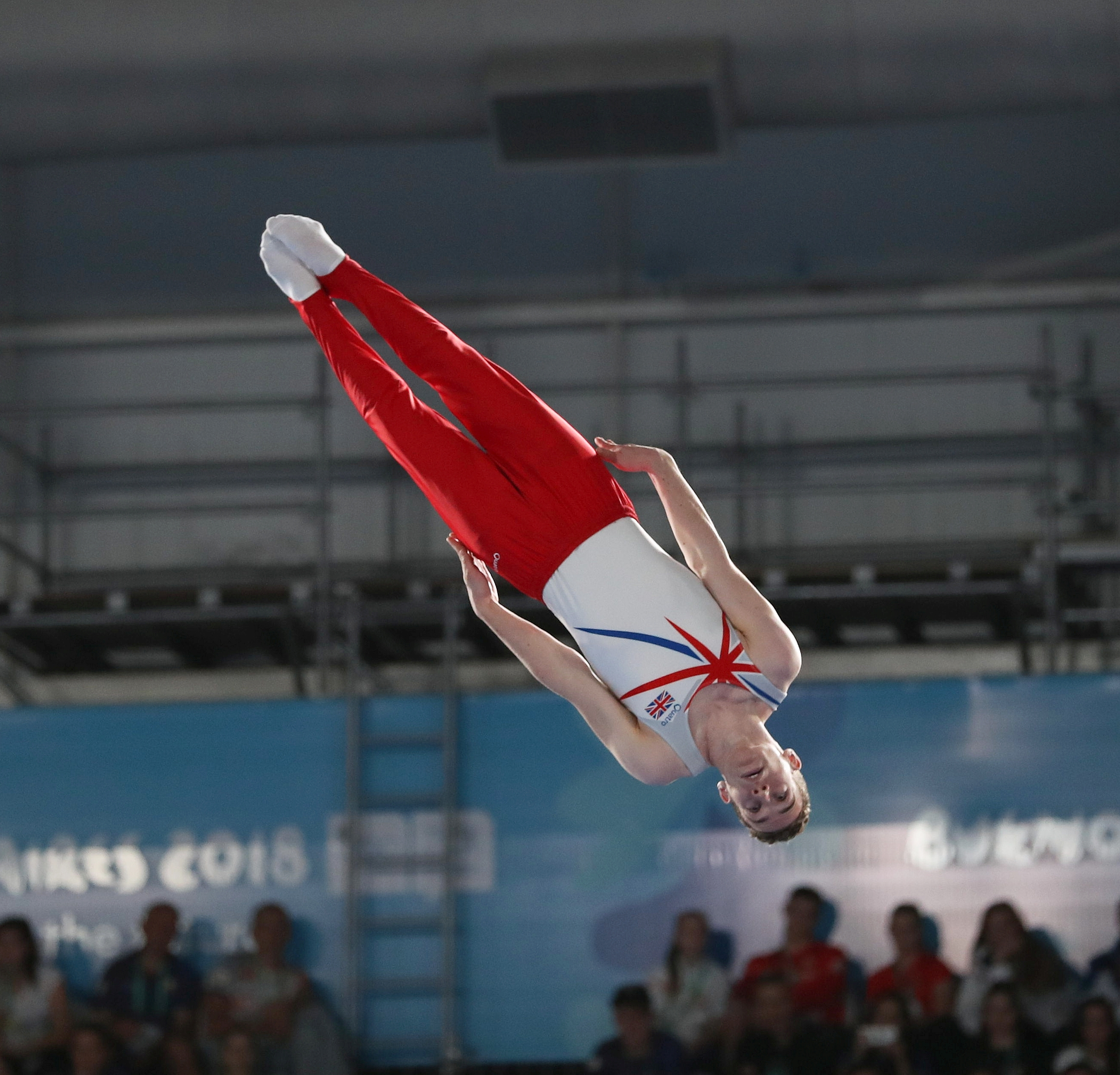
Andrew Stamp

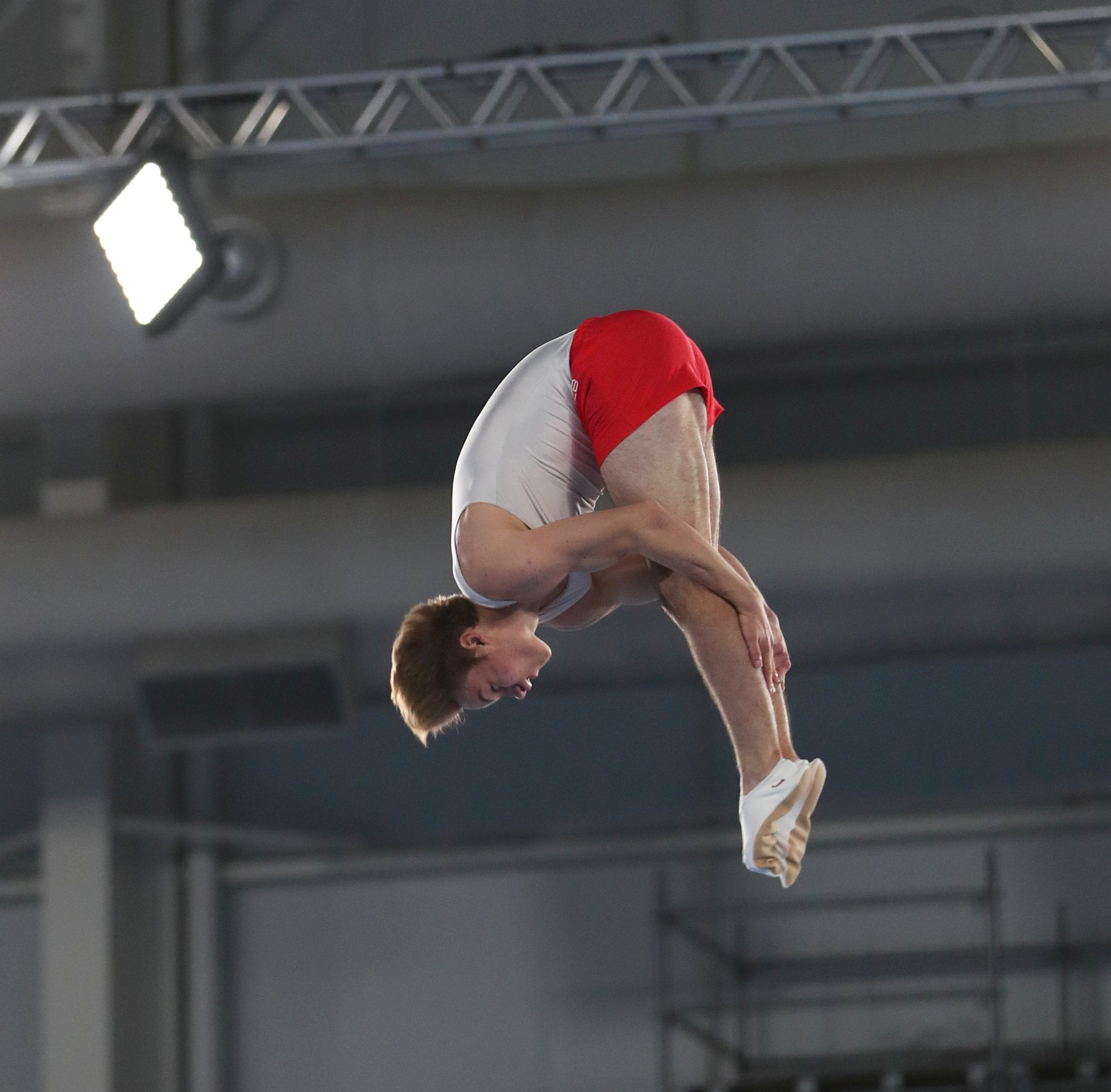
Benny Wizani
