= Atlético Clube de Portugal =

Portuguese association football club

- Full name: Atlético Clube de Portugal
- Nicknames: Alcantarenses; Carroceiros (Wagoners)
- Founded: 18 September 1942; 84 years ago
- Ground: Tapadinha
- Capacity: 4,000
- Chairman: Ricardo Delgado
- Manager: Pedro D’Oliveira
- League: Liga 3
- 2024–25: Liga 3 (Portugal), Promotion group (8th)
Home colours	Away colours	Third colours

Atlético Clube de Portugal is a Portuguese sports club based in the parish of Alcântara, in the west side of Lisbon. The club was established on 18 September 1942 through the merger of two local clubs from Alcântara: Carcavelinhos Football Club and União Foot-Ball Lisboa. In addition to football, the club has sections for futsal and basketball. Historically, it also had sections for field hockey, swimming, sport fishing, cycling, table tennis, rugby, volleyball, gymnastics, triathlon, and handball.

== History ==
Atlético Clube de Portugal was formed when two clubs from west Lisbon, Carcavelinhos and União, merged to create a stronger team. The merger was formalised on the night of 18 September 1942, during a grand session held in the Cinema Promotora, owned by the Sociedade Promotora de Educação Popular, in Alcântara.

=== A decade of great success ===
The early years of Atlético Clube de Portugal were marked by significant success. By combining the talent and resources of two of Lisbon's strongest teams, the club achieved outstanding results in football, basketball, and field hockey.

The club's first title came from the basketball team, which won the 1942/43 Regional Championship of Lisbon. This was the first of five Lisbon Championships won within a decade. The basketball team also won the Cup of Honour (predecessor of the Portuguese Cup) in 1943/44, a 2nd Division title in 1943/44, and a Portuguese Cup in 1953/54.

The rugby section, composed of former students from the Instituto Superior de Agronomia, won two Regional Championships of Lisbon.

In football, the club reached the Portuguese Cup final twice, in 1946 and 1949, although they lost both times. They also secured two podium finishes in the 1st Division and won the 2nd Division title in 1944/45, marking some of the club's greatest achievements.

In 1951, Atlético was awarded the rank of Official of the Military Order of Christ for its cultural and athletic contributions to national sports.

=== Consolidation ===
Following its initial success, Atlético entered a period of consolidation. The football team began to feature players from the club's own schools, such as Orlando Paulos, Tomé Antunes, Vítor Lopes, Carlos Gomes, and Germano de Figueiredo. Other notable players included José Henrique, Mario Imbelloni, António Castiglia, Enrique Messiano, and Henrique Ben David. Despite this, the club often found itself mid-table in the 1st Division and was relegated several times, eventually falling to the 2nd Division in 1976/77 and never returning.

=== The rise of amateur sports ===
In 1972, Atlético inaugurated its multi-sports pavilion. The 1970s and 1980s were marked by achievements in amateur sports, particularly basketball, which produced several generations of talented athletes and won numerous titles. Notable achievements included three National U-19 Championships, two U-17 Championships, and a 2nd Division title with the main team. Atlético became a respected presence in national basketball.

Other sports also benefited from the construction of the Pavilion Engenheiro Santos e Castro, including women's volleyball (which won three Portuguese Cups and was the first team to participate in European competitions) and handball (which won the 2nd Division).

In 1981, Atlético Clube de Portugal was recognised as an Entidade de utilidade pública (public utility entity), a Portuguese form of non-profit association.

=== The 1990s: a period of decline ===
Football, the club's main sport, struggled in the 1990s, with no major highlights. Other sports also saw limited success, except for futsal, which won a District Championship and participated in the National Championship finals several times.

In 1992, during the club's 50th-anniversary celebrations, the Lisbon City Council awarded Atlético the Municipal Gold Medal of Merit, and the Government of the Republic awarded it the Medal of Good Sporting Services.

=== A new era of success ===
The new millennium brought more titles for Atlético. The senior football team won the 3rd Division twice and was promoted to the 2nd League in 2011. The U-19 team won the Lisbon Honour Division in 2006 and the National Championship of the 2nd Division in 2013. The U-17 team returned to national competitions in 2014 after a 15-year absence.

The basketball youth team won the Under-20 National Cup in 2007. The senior team won the National Championship of the 1st Division in 2013/14, returning the club to Proliga. In the 2015/16 season, Atlético finished second in the Proliga championship and earned the right to compete in the League (LPB), although this right was not exercised, relegating the team back to the National Championship of the 1st Division.

Futsal also saw success, winning the Division of Honour of the Lisbon Football Association in 2012/13 and earning promotion to the 2nd National Division the following season.

Field hockey returned to the club in 2015, winning the National Indoor Hockey Championship in the 2015/16 season.

The triathlon team won three national championships, with Sérgio Marques earning a bronze and a silver medal in European Championships.

The club also resumed water activities, managing the Alvito Municipal Pools since 2009.

=== Financial difficulties ===
After being promoted to the 2nd League, Atlético faced financial challenges. Increased liabilities and regulations from the Portuguese Professional Football League led the club to form a Sociedade Anónima Desportiva (SAD), which was approved by club members at a general meeting in April 2013.

The formation of the SAD in 2013/14 brought new problems, with conflicts arising between the SAD and the club's board. The professional team struggled on the field, facing relegation for three consecutive years, although they were saved by administrative decisions in 2013/14 and 2014/15.

The chairman of the SAD, Xialong Ji, was appointed by Anping Football Limited, owned by Eric Mao. Rumours of match-fixing involving the company, including a UEFA report, strained the relationship between the club and Anping.

In 2016, Armando Hipólito won the club elections and severed ties with the SAD, banning the professional team from using the club's facilities.

Hipólito's tenure was marked by a deep economic crisis. The club lost management of the Alvito Municipal Pools, and the board resigned in April 2017, calling for early elections.

Ricardo Delgado won the subsequent elections and became the president of Atlético Clube de Portugal. In September 2017, the team managed by the SAD was disqualified from the regional championship after missing two consecutive games.

Following the split from the SAD at the conclusion of the 2015–16 season under the Armando Hipólito administration, the club registered a team with the Lisbon Football Association. This team was placed in the 1st Division of the association, effectively taking the spot of the former reserve team of the SAD, which had won the 2nd Division championship in the previous season.

The 2016–17 season proved frustrating, with Atlético missing promotion by four points. Neighbors Santo António de Lisboa secured promotion in a championship won by Mem Martins.

In the 2017–18 season, the club announced its entry into women's football, forming a team to compete in the Division of Promotion and the Cup of Portugal.

The club continues to maintain youth teams ranging from under-10 to under-19.

In the 2021–22 season, Atlético achieved promotion to the Campeonato de Portugal after a four-year absence. In the 2022–23 season, the club made history by earning promotion to Liga 3 for the first time and becoming champions of the Campeonato de Portugal.

=== New investment ===
During the 2023 season, a new SAD was formed and 90% of the team was purchased by Signature Football Holdings, an investment group led by former New York City council speaker Gifford Miller. The club retains 10% ownership. Signature Football Holdings has stated plans to invest significantly into the team and stadium over the coming years. The first year under new ownership was marked by relative success as Atlético made the promotion round of Liga 3 before ultimately falling short of promotion to Liga 2.

== Stadium ==
On formation of the club in 1942, Atlético inherited the Campo da Tapadinha, home ground of Carcavelinhos. In 1945, the club renovated the field, which became known as Estádio da Tapadinha. The capacity of the stadium has been reduced to 4,000 from 10,000 due to the closure of one of the stands.

In the early years of the club, matches were also played at the Campo de Santo Amaro, which had been the home of União Foot-Ball Lisboa.

The Engenheiro Santos e Castro Pavilion, located next to the Estádio da Tapadinha, was constructed in 1972 to cater for indoor sports. The pavilion was named in honour of Fernando Augusto Santos e Castro who had been mayor of Lisbon in 1970 and 1971.

== Current squad ==
As of 21 September 2026

Note: Flags indicate national team as defined under FIFA eligibility rules; some limited exceptions apply. Players may hold more than one non-FIFA nationality.

No.	Pos.	Nation	Player
2	DF	POR	Janico
4	DF	POR	Duarte Henriques
5	DF	POR	Vicente Durand
6	MF	POR	Gabriel Costa
8	MF	ANG	César Sousa
9	FW	BRA	Nicolas Souza
10	MF	BRA	Caleb
11	FW	CPV	Hélder Suker
14	FW	POR	Eric Oliveira
17	MF	POR	Bernardo Lourenço
18	MF	POR	Ricardo Dias
19	FW	ESP	Solo Traoré
20	FW	POR	Edgar Pacheco
22	GK	POR	Nuno Hidalgo

No.	Pos.	Nation	Player
23	FW	POR	Diego Arezes
28	MF	CIV	Mohamed Konaté
29	DF	POR	David Dinamite
30	DF	POR	Edu Monteiro
33	DF	BRA	Alison Calegari
38	FW	BRA	Caio Santana
44	DF	POR	Bura
45	DF	POR	Rafael Tavares
47	FW	POR	Pedro Ramos
59	FW	FRA	Tom Auvré
81	GK	VEN	José Bolivar
85	FW	POR	Nuno Gaspar
99	GK	POR	Rodrigo Dias

=== Out on loan ===
Note: Flags indicate national team as defined under FIFA eligibility rules; some limited exceptions apply. Players may hold more than one non-FIFA nationality.

No.	Pos.	Nation	Player
—	DF	POR	Óscar Garcia (at Vitória de Setúbal until 30 June 2027)

== Notable players ==
- (Portugal) Rui Águas
- (Portugal) José Bastos
- (Portugal) Henrique Ben David
- (Brazil) Chiquinho Carlos
- (Portugal) José Carlos
- (Portugal) Luís Carlos
- (Portugal) Germano de Figueiredo
- (Portugal) João Galo
- (Portugal) José Henrique
- (Zaire) Kalombo N'Kongolo
- (Portugal) Ernesto Oliveira
- (Portugal) João Oliveira Pinto
- (Portugal) Paulo Torres

== Current sports ==
=== Football ===
Football, since its foundation, has always been the most prominent sport in the club.

=== Basketball ===
Basketball remains a popular sport among the club's members. The senior team competes in the National Championship of the 1st Division, the third tier of Portuguese basketball, following relegation from the Proliga due to the team's decision to decline participation in the LPB in 2016–17.

The club also organises basketball activities across various age groups for both male and female players, including mini-basketball.

=== Futsal ===
The futsal section has been active since 1986 and was once a powerhouse in Portugal. The team achieved second place in the National Championship in the 1991–92 and 1993–94 seasons, as well as third place in the 1992–93, 1999–00, and 2000–01 seasons.

However, the club currently faces financial challenges, resulting in a reset and a place in the 1st Division of the Lisbon Football Association, the lowest division.

Ruben Simões, a UEFA Futsal Cup winner with Benfica in 2010, serves as the team's captain.

The club also fields a youth team that competes in the Lisbon Football Association Division of Honour U-19.

== Honours ==
As of 2 January 2025

Men's football

Competition	Titles	Seasons
Segunda Divisão (Note: The Segunda Divisão was the second tier of Portuguese football between 1934 and 1990. It became the third tier between 1990 and 2013, before merging with the Terceira Divisão to form the Campeonato de Portugal)	3	1944–45, 1958–59, 1967–68
Terceira Divisão – Série F (Note: The Terceira Divisão was the fourth tier of Portuguese football between 1990 and 2013)	1	2003–04
Terceira Divisão – Série E	1	2005–06
Campeonato de Portugal (Note: The Campeonato de Portugal was the third tier of Portuguese football between 2013 and 2021, becoming the fourth tier in 2021)	1	2022–23
Lisbon Football Association - 1st Division	1	2021–22
Lisbon Football Association - Honour Division	1	2018–19
Lisbon Football Association - Cup of Honour – 2nd Division	1	1987–88
Lisbon Football Association - Lisbon Cup of Honour – 3rd Division	1	1980–81
Junior 2nd Division National Championship	1	2012–13
Lisbon Junior Championship	2	1951–52, 1953–54
Honour Division of the Lisbon Youth Football Association	1	2005–06

Women's Football

Competition	Titles	Seasons
Lisbon Football Association - Honour Cup	1	1981–82

Basketball

Competition	Titles	Seasons
Portuguese Basketball Cup	2	1943–44, 1953–54
Cup of Honour	1	1943–44
National Under-20 Cup	1	2006–07
National 2nd Division Championship	2	1943–44, 1976–77
National Senior 1st Division Championship	1	2013–14
Lisbon Championship	6	1942–43, 1943–44, 1946–47, 1950–51, 1951–52
National Junior Championship	2	1975–76, 1989–90
National Youth Championship	3	1973–74, 1974–75, 1987–88
Lisbon Championship – 2nd Category	1	1959–60

Volleyball

Competition	Titles	Seasons
Portuguese Cup – Women	3	1981–82, 1982–83, 1983–84
Lisbon Championship – 1st Division	1	1952–53
Lisbon Championship – 2nd Division	1	1958–59
Lisbon Reserve Championship – 2nd Division	2	1955–56, 1956–57

Rugby

Competition	Titles	Seasons
Lisbon Championship	2	1943–44, 1945–46

Handball

Competition	Titles	Seasons
National Championship 2nd Division	1	1971–72

Field Hockey

Competition	Titles	Seasons
National Indoor Hockey Championship	1	2015–16
Lisbon Championship	1	1959–60
Lisbon Reserve Championship	2	1951–52, 1954–55
Lisbon Junior Championship	1	1953–54

Futsal

Competition	Titles	Seasons
Honour Cup of the 1st Division Lisbon Football Association	2	1990–91, 1991–92
Lisbon Football Association Social Communication Honour Cup	1	1990–91
Honour Division Lisbon Football Association	1	2012–13
1st Division Lisbon Football Association	1	2021–22
Lisbon Football Association Cup	1	2021–22
Women's National Division II	1	2022–23
Women's 1st Division Lisbon Football Association	1	2021–22
Women's National Cup	1	2021–22

Triathlon

Competition	Titles	Seasons
Absolute National Champion of Men's Long Distance Triathlon	1	2016
Absolute National Champion of Women's Long Distance Triathlon	2	2015, 2016
