= Futsal at the 2018 Summer Youth Olympics – Girls' tournament =

2018 Summer Youth Olympics girls' futsal tournament
Tournament details
- Host country: Argentina
- Dates: 7–17 October 2018
- Teams: 10 (from 6 confederations)
- Venues: 2 (in 2 host cities)

Final positions
- Champions: Portugal (1st title)
- Runners-up: Japan
- Third place: Spain
- Fourth place: Bolivia

Tournament statistics
- Matches played: 24
- Goals scored: 226 (9.42 per match)
- Attendance: 43,814 (1,826 per match)
- Top scorer: (Portugal) Fifó (21 goals)

The girls' futsal tournament at the 2018 Summer Youth Olympics took place in Buenos Aires, Argentina between 7–17 October 2018.

== Squads ==
Each team had to name a preliminary squad of 20 players (minimum three must be goalkeepers). From the preliminary squad, the team had to name a final squad of 10 players (minimum two must be goalkeepers) by the FIFA deadline.

== Group stage ==
=== Group C ===
Pos	Team	Pld	W	D	L	GF	GA	GD	Pts	Qualification
1	Spain	4	4	0	0	39	5	+34	12	Semi-finals
2	Bolivia	4	3	0	1	20	17	+3	9	Semi-finals
3	Thailand	4	2	0	2	29	13	+16	6	
4	Trinidad and Tobago	4	1	0	3	10	40	−30	3	
5	Tonga	4	0	0	4	8	31	−23	0	

Source: FIFA IOC
7 October 2018
14:00

Spain	9–2	Bolivia
de las Heras 5', 12', 24', 25'; Martínez 10', 37'; Gulli 20'; Agulla 22'; Pérez 22'	Report (FIFA); Report (IOC)	Gálvez 25', 34'

Tecnópolis
Attendance: 2,400
Referee: Hiroyuki Kobayashi (Japan)
7 October 2018
16:00

Trinidad and Tobago	0–14	Thailand
	Report (FIFA); Report (IOC)	Paerploy 2'; Techinee 5'; Ladawan 6', 12', 20', 21'; Thidarat 9', 32'; Pattarawarin 17', 38'; Yodwadee 24', 30'; Yuphawadi 27', 28'

Tecnópolis
Attendance: 2,260
Referee: Antony Riley (New Zealand)

8 October 2018
16:00

Bolivia	7–2	Tonga
Pacheco 2'; Gálvez 11', 16', 18', 30'; Montecinos 23', 24'	Report (FIFA); Report (IOC) Category:Futsal at the 2018 Summer Youth Olympics – Girls First Round – BOL-TGA on Wikimedia Commons	Lutu 3'; Akolo 32'

Tecnópolis
Attendance: 710
Referee: Irina Velikanova (Russia)
9 October 2018
16:00

Thailand	2–6	Spain
Pattarawarin 30'; Yodwadee 31'	Report (FIFA); Report (IOC)	de las Heras 8', 13'; Agulla 16', 25'; Martínez 18'; Gulli 33'

Tecnópolis
Attendance: 960
Referee: Victor Berg (France)

10 October 2018
14:00

Tonga	5–7	Trinidad and Tobago
Akolo 8'; Lutu 9', 24', 26'; Finau 33'	Report (FIFA); Report (IOC)	Cornwall 15', 22', 37', 39'; Prince 22', 33'; Mejias 25'

Tecnópolis
Attendance: 3,000
Referee: Ricardo Amaral (Brazil)
10 October 2018
16:00

Bolivia	6–4	Thailand
Álvarez 8'; Gálvez 18', 22', 39'; Mendiola 20'; Fernández 25'	Report (FIFA); Report (IOC)	Yuphawadi 18', 19', 21'; Paerploy 33'

Tecnópolis
Attendance: 4,690
Referee: Roberto Sánchez (Cuba)

11 October 2018
16:00

Tonga	0–8	Spain
	Report (FIFA); Report (IOC)	Polovili 1' (o.g.); Miranda 2', 12'; de las Heras 3'; Agulla 6'; López-Pardo 13', 18'; Montesinos 33'

Tecnópolis
Attendance: 1,200
Referee: Khalid Hnich (Morocco)
12 October 2018
16:00

Trinidad and Tobago	2–5	Bolivia
Seleme 16' (o.g.); Mejias 21'	Report (FIFA); Report (IOC)	Gálvez 4', 18', 38', 39'; Álvarez 35'

Tecnópolis
Attendance: 2,300
Referee: Gelareh Nazemi (Iran)

13 October 2018
16:00

Spain	16–1	Trinidad and Tobago
Pérez 1', 9', 15', 33', 37'; Agulla 2', 5'; de las Heras 2', 28'; Martínez 4', 25'; López-Pardo 6', 34'; Miranda 8', 35'; Montesinos 16'	Report (FIFA); Report (IOC)	Hackshaw 11'

Tecnópolis
Attendance: 2,780
Referee: Ricardo Amaral (Brazil)
13 October 2018
16:00

Thailand	9–1	Tonga
Pattarawarin 6'; Yodwadee 14', 28'; Thidarat 18', 30'; Paerploy 21', 32', 33'; Yuphawadi 21'	Report (FIFA); Report (IOC)	Lutu 38'

CeNARD
Attendance: 653
Referee: Tayana Moreno (Venezuela)

=== Group D ===
Pos	Team	Pld	W	D	L	GF	GA	GD	Pts	Qualification
1	Portugal	4	4	0	0	37	2	+35	12	Semi-finals
2	Japan	4	3	0	1	16	7	+9	9	Semi-finals
3	Cameroon	4	2	0	2	16	13	+3	6	
4	Chile	4	0	1	3	6	27	−21	1	
5	Dominican Republic	4	0	1	3	6	32	−26	1	

Source: FIFA IOC
7 October 2018
14:00

Dominican Republic	1–9	Cameroon
Muñiz 31'	Report (FIFA); Report (IOC) Category:Futsal at the 2018 Summer Youth Olympics – Girls First Round – DOM-CRM on Wikimedia Commons	Tchomte 9', 11', 13'; Ndzana 17', 35', 39'; Mbomozomo 22', 32'; Mbofewuie 37'

CeNARD
Attendance: 0
Referee: Gelareh Nazemi (Iran)
7 October 2018
16:00

Chile	2–15	Portugal
Aguirre 21'; Salvo 38'	Report (FIFA); Report (IOC) Category:Futsal at the 2018 Summer Youth Olympics – Girls First Round – CHI-POR on Wikimedia Commons	Carol 2'; Telma 4'; Fifó 7', 28', 29', 31', 39'; Martinha 8', 16', 22'; Sanheiro 19', 31', 32'; Campos 35' (o.g.); Silva 38'

CeNARD
Attendance: 0
Referee: Ovidiu Curta (Romania)

8 October 2018
14:00

Cameroon	2–6	Japan
Tchomte 29'; Kalieu 35'	Report (FIFA); Report (IOC)	Maeda 7', 36'; Yamakawa 8', 20'; Miyamoto 34'; Oino 38'

Tecnópolis
Attendance: 1,260
Referee: Andres Peña (Argentina)
9 October 2018
14:00

Portugal	14–0	Dominican Republic
Silva 7', 23'; Carol 10', 19', 26', 30'; Leninha 13', 22', 28'; Martinha 15', 29'; Sanheiro 27'; Fifó 29', 32'	Report (FIFA); Report (IOC)

Tecnópolis
Attendance: 1,600
Referee: Diego Molina (Costa Rica)

10 October 2018
14:00

Japan	4–1	Chile
Miyamoto 13'; Maeda 23'; Arai 27'; Carrasco 33' (o.g.)	Report (FIFA); Report (IOC)	Mora 17'

CeNARD
Attendance: 227
Referee: Leandro Lorenzo (Argentina)
10 October 2018
16:00

Cameroon	0–6	Portugal
	Report (FIFA); Report (IOC)	Fifó 2', 4', 23', 32'; Carol 16'; Leninha 32'

CeNARD
Attendance: 440
Referee: Rafael Villalba (Paraguay)

11 October 2018
14:00

Japan	6–2	Dominican Republic
Yokoyama 7'; Oino 9'; Ikeuchi 18'; Abe 19'; Arai 22'; Maeda 27'	Report (FIFA); Report (IOC)	Collado 3', 4'

Tecnópolis
Attendance: 2,085
Referee: Tayana Moreno (Venezuela)
12 October 2018
14:00

Chile	0–5	Cameroon
	Report (FIFA); Report (IOC)	Ndzana 16', 18', 22'; Campos 28' (o.g.); Mbofewuie 33'

Tecnópolis
Attendance: 2,530
Referee: Rafael Villalba (Paraguay)

13 October 2018
14:00

Dominican Republic	3–3	Chile
Muñiz 1'; Ditrén 7', 27'	Report (FIFA); Report (IOC)	Aguirre 26'; Pérez 36'; Keefe 40' (pen.)

Tecnópolis
Attendance: 1,960
Referee: Lee Po-fu (Chinese Taipei)
13 October 2018
14:00

Portugal	2–0	Japan
Sanheiro 5'; Pereira 21'	Report FIFA); Report (IOC)

CeNARD
Attendance: 359
Referee: Rafael Villalba (Paraguay)

== Knockout stage ==
=== Bracket ===
Semi-finals
15 October – Tecnópolis
Portugal	16
Bolivia	2
15 October – Tecnópolis
Spain	2
Japan	3

Gold medal match
17 October – Tecnópolis
Portugal	4
Japan	1
Bronze medal match
17 October – Tecnópolis
Bolivia	0
Spain	11

=== Semi-finals ===
15 October 2018
14:00

Portugal	16–2	Bolivia
Fifó 4', 8', 33', 37', 39', 39'; Carol 13', 35'; Pereira 16', 16'; Leninha 17'; Sanheiro 22', 38'; Martinha 28', 29', 33'	Report (FIFA); Report (IOC)	Gálvez 2'; Álvarez 28'

Tecnópolis
Attendance: 2,700
Referee: Roberto Sánchez (Cuba)
15 October 2018
16:00

Spain	2–3	Japan
de las Heras 17', 39'	Report (FIFA); Report (IOC)	Maeda 21'; Arai 24'; Oino 32'

Tecnópolis
Attendance: 6,200
Referee: Lance Vanhaitsma (United States)

=== Bronze medal match ===
17 October 2018
15:30

Bolivia	0–11	Spain
	Report (FIFA); Report IOC) Category:Futsal at the 2018 Summer Youth Olympics – Girls Bronze medal match on Wikimedia Commons	de las Heras 1'; Pérez 2', 3'; Miranda 12', 14', 24'; Gulli 17'; Martínez 25', 34', 35'; López-Pardo 34'

Tecnópolis
Attendance: 1,700
Referee: Valeria Palma (Chile)

=== Gold medal match ===
17 October 2018
18:00

Portugal	4–1	Japan
Fifó 1', 9', 14', 21'	Report (FIFA); Report (IOC) Category:Futsal at the 2018 Summer Youth Olympics – Girls Final on Wikimedia Commons	Yamakawa 21'

Tecnópolis
Attendance: 1,800
Referee: Gelareh Nazemi (Iran)

== Overall ranking ==
Pos	Team	Pld	W	D	L	GF	GA	GD	Pts
1st place, gold medalist(s)	Portugal	6	6	0	0	57	5	+52	18
2nd place, silver medalist(s)	Japan	6	4	0	2	20	13	+7	12
3rd place, bronze medalist(s)	Spain	6	5	0	1	52	8	+44	15
4	Bolivia	6	3	0	3	22	44	−22	9
5	Thailand	4	2	0	2	29	13	+16	6
6	Cameroon	4	2	0	2	16	13	+3	6
7	Trinidad and Tobago	4	1	0	3	10	40	−30	3
8	Chile	4	0	1	3	6	27	−21	1
9	Dominican Republic	4	0	1	3	6	32	−26	1
10	Tonga	4	0	0	4	8	31	−23	0

Source: IOC
Rules for classification: (5th to 10th place) 1) points; 2) goal difference; 3) goals scored; 4) equal ranking if still tied (regulations Article 15.6).

== Goalscorers ==
There were 226 goals scored in 24 matches, for an average of 9.42 goals per match.

21 goals

- (Portugal) Fifó

14 goals

- (Bolivia) María Gálvez

12 goals

- (Spain) Noelia de las Heras

8 goals

- (Portugal) Carol
- (Portugal) Martinha
- (Spain) Antonia Martínez
- (Spain) Antia Pérez

7 goals

- (Portugal) Beatriz Sanheiro
- (Spain) Yarima Miranda

6 goals

- (Cameroon) Colette Ndzana
- (Spain) Carolina Agulla
- (Thailand) Yuphawadi Chadaeng

5 goals

- (Japan) Miu Maeda
- (Portugal) Leninha
- (Spain) Marta López-Pardo
- (Thailand) Paerploy Huajaipetch
- (Thailand) Yodwadee Thongkham
- (Tonga) Seini Lutu

4 goals

- (Cameroon) Linda Tchomte
- (Portugal) Telma Pereira
- (Thailand) Ladawan Klinbunkaew
- (Thailand) Pattarawarin Nuathong
- (Thailand) Thidarat Sribunhom
- (Trinidad and Tobago) Afiyah Cornwall

3 goals

- (Bolivia) Fabiana Álvarez
- (Japan) Ichika Arai
- (Japan) Sara Oino
- (Japan) Rikako Yamakawa
- (Portugal) Beatriz Silva
- (Spain) Èlia Gulli

2 goals

- (Bolivia) Guadalupe Montecinos
- (Cameroon) Syrielle Mbofewuie
- (Cameroon) Brigitte Mbomozomo
- (Chile) Daniela Aguirre
- (Dominican Republic) Alondra Collado
- (Dominican Republic) María Ditrén
- (Dominican Republic) Karla Muñiz
- (Japan) Mai Miyamoto
- (Spain) Teresa Montesinos
- (Tonga) Mele Akolo
- (Trinidad and Tobago) Moenesa Mejias
- (Trinidad and Tobago) Aaliyah Prince

1 goal

- (Bolivia) Karime Fernández
- (Bolivia) Aidé Mendiola
- (Bolivia) Mechelle Pacheco
- (Cameroon) Vanessa Kalieu
- (Chile) Sonya Keefe
- (Chile) Grace Mora
- (Chile) Carla Pérez
- (Chile) Javiera Salvo
- (Japan) Mirano Abe
- (Japan) Aki Ikeuchi
- (Japan) Rinka Yokoyama
- (Thailand) Techinee Promnak
- (Tonga) Finehika Finau
- (Trinidad and Tobago) Nathifa Hackshaw

1 own goal

- (Bolivia) Alexandra Seleme (against Trinidad and Tobago)
- (Chile) Lissette Carrasco (against Japan)
- (Tonga) Ana Polovili (against Spain)

2 own goals

- (Chile) Lorna Campos (against Portugal, Cameroon)
