= Portugal at the 2018 Summer Youth Olympics =

- IOC code: POR
- NOC: Olympic Committee of Portugal
- Website: http://www.comiteolimpicoportugal.pt/

in Buenos Aires, Argentina 6 – 18 October 2018
- Competitors: 41 in 12 sports
- Medals Ranked 50th: Gold 1 Silver 2 Bronze 0 Total 3

Summer Youth Olympics appearances
- 2010; 2014; 2018; 2026

Portugal participated at the 2018 Summer Youth Olympics in Buenos Aires, Argentina from 6 October to 18 October 2018.

== Canoeing ==
Portugal qualified one boat based on its performance at the 2018 World Qualification Event.

- Boys' C1 - 1 boat

Athlete	Event	Qualification		Repechage		Quarterfinals	Semifinals	Final / BM	Rank
Athlete	Event	Time	Rank	Time	Rank	Opposition Result	Opposition Result	Opposition Result	Rank
César Soares	Boys' C1 sprint	1:53.98	1	Bye		Minařík (CZE); L 1:52.91	did not advance		
César Soares	Boys' C1 slalom	DSQ		did not advance					

== Futsal ==
Summary

Team	Event	Group Stage					Semifinal	Final / BM	
Team	Event	Opposition score	Opposition score	Opposition score	Opposition score	Rank	Opposition score	Opposition score	Rank
Portugal	Girls' tournament	Cameroon; W 6–0	Chile; W 15–2	Dominican Republic; W 14–0	Japan; W 2–0	1	Bolivia; W 16–2	Japan; W 4–1	1st place, gold medalist(s)

Group D

Pos	Team	Pld	W	D	L	GF	GA	GD	Pts	Qualification
1	Portugal	4	4	0	0	37	2	+35	12	Semi-finals
2	Japan	4	3	0	1	16	7	+9	9	Semi-finals
3	Cameroon	4	2	0	2	16	13	+3	6	
4	Chile	4	0	1	3	6	27	−21	1	
5	Dominican Republic	4	0	1	3	6	32	−26	1	

Source: FIFA IOC
7 October 2018
16:00

Chile	2–15	Portugal
Aguirre 21'; Salvo 38'	Report (FIFA); Report (IOC) Category:Futsal at the 2018 Summer Youth Olympics – Girls First Round – CHI-POR on Wikimedia Commons	Carol 2'; Telma 4'; Fifó 7', 28', 29', 31', 39'; Martinha 8', 16', 22'; Sanheiro 19', 31', 32'; Campos 35' (o.g.); Silva 38'

CeNARD
Attendance: 0
Referee: Ovidiu Curta (Romania)
9 October 2018
14:00

Portugal	14–0	Dominican Republic
Silva 7', 23'; Carol 10', 19', 26', 30'; Leninha 13', 22', 28'; Martinha 15', 29'; Sanheiro 27'; Fifó 29', 32'	Report (FIFA); Report (IOC)

Tecnópolis
Attendance: 1,600
Referee: Diego Molina (Costa Rica)
10 October 2018
16:00

Cameroon	0–6	Portugal
	Report (FIFA); Report (IOC)	Fifó 2', 4', 23', 32'; Carol 16'; Leninha 32'

CeNARD
Attendance: 440
Referee: Rafael Villalba (Paraguay)
13 October 2018
14:00

Portugal	2–0	Japan
Sanheiro 5'; Pereira 21'	Report FIFA); Report (IOC)

CeNARD
Attendance: 359
Referee: Rafael Villalba (Paraguay)

Semi-finals

15 October 2018
14:00

Portugal	16–2	Bolivia
Fifó 4', 8', 33', 37', 39', 39'; Carol 13', 35'; Pereira 16', 16'; Leninha 17'; Sanheiro 22', 38'; Martinha 28', 29', 33'	Report (FIFA); Report (IOC)	Gálvez 2'; Álvarez 28'

Tecnópolis
Attendance: 2,700
Referee: Roberto Sánchez (Cuba)

Finals

17 October 2018
18:00

Portugal	4–1	Japan
Fifó 1', 9', 14', 21'	Report (FIFA); Report (IOC) Category:Futsal at the 2018 Summer Youth Olympics – Girls Final on Wikimedia Commons	Yamakawa 21'

Tecnópolis
Attendance: 1,800
Referee: Gelareh Nazemi (Iran)

== Gymnastics ==
=== Acrobatic ===
Portugal qualified a mixed pair based on its performance at the 2018 Acrobatic Gymnastics World Championship.

- Mixed pair - 1 team of 2 athletes

=== Artistic ===
Portugal qualified one gymnast based on its performance at the 2018 European Junior Championship.

- Girls' artistic individual all-around - 1 quota

=== Trampoline ===
Portugal qualified one gymnasts based on its performance at the 2018 European Junior Championship.

- Boys' trampoline - 1 quota

== Karate ==
- 1 quota – Girls' −53kg

Athlete	Event	Group Stage				Semifinal	Final / BM	
Athlete	Event	Opposition Score	Opposition Score	Opposition Score	Rank	Opposition Score	Opposition Score	Rank
Tânia de Barros	Girls' 53 kg	Rinka Tahata (JPN); L 0-2	Aika Okazaki (THA); L 0-2	Fatemeh Khonakdar (IRI); L 0-6	4	did not advance		

== Sailing ==
Portugal qualified one boat based on its performance at the Techno 293+ European Qualifier.

- Boys' Techno 293+ - 1 boat

== Triathlon ==
Portugal qualified two athletes based on its performance at the 2018 European Youth Olympic Games Qualifier.

Individual

Athlete	Event	Swim (750m)	Trans 1	Bike (20 km)	Trans 2	Run (5 km)	Total Time	Rank
Alexandre Montez	Boys	9:44	0:31	27:23	0:28	15:33	53:39	2nd place, silver medalist(s)
Ines Rico	Girls	10:36	0:42	31:19	0:32	20:08	1:03:17	22

Relay

Athlete	Event	Total Times per Athlete (Swim 250m, Bike 6.6 km, Run 1.8 km)	Total Group Time	Rank
Europe 1 Sif Bendix Madsen (DEN); Alessio Crociani (ITA); Anja Weber (SUI); Alexandre Montez (POR)	Mixed Relay	21:42 (1); 20:55 (3); 22:40 (1); 20:55 (1)	1:26:12	1st place, gold medalist(s)
Europe 6 Ines Rico (POR); Jan Škrjanc (SLO); Libby Coleman (GBR); Rik Malcorps (BEL)	Mixed Relay	23:01 (10); 21:27 (7); 23:14 (4); 21:53 (6)	1:29:21	5
