= Colette Ndzana =

Cameroonian football and futsal player

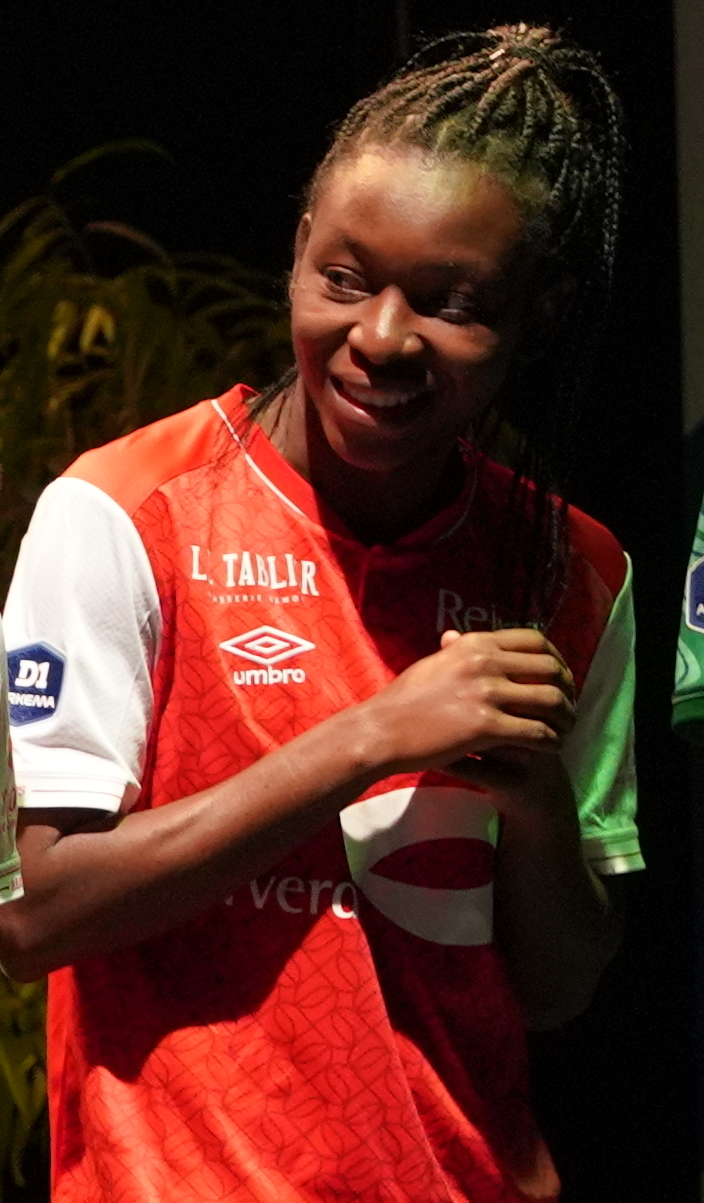
- Ndzana in 2024

Personal information
- Full name: Colette Ndzana Fegue
- Date of birth: 19 July 2000 (age 26)
- Place of birth: Cameroon
- Height: 1.60 m (5 ft 3 in)
- Position: Left back

Team information
- Current team: Fenerbahçe
- Number: 7

Senior career*
Years	Team	Apps	(Gls)
- Éclair
2021–2022	Dinamo-BGU Minsk	44	(4)
2023	Granadilla	7	(0)
2023–2025	Reims	39	(0)
2025–2026	Dijon	13	(0)
2026–	Fenerbahçe	1	(0)

International career^{‡}
2018	Cameroon U-18 (futsal)	2+	(6)
2019	Cameroon U20		
2019–	Cameroon	2	(0)
Medal record
Women's Africa Cup of Nations
Gold medal – first place	2026 Morocco
- * Club domestic league appearances and goals as of 05:09, 8 September 2026 (UTC) ‡ National team caps and goals as of 12 November 2019

Colette Ndzana Fegue (born 19 July 2000), known as Colette Ndzana, is a Cameroonian professional footballer and former futsal player who plays as a left back for Fenerbahçe of the Turkish Women's Super League and the Cameroon women's national team.

== Club career ==
Ndzana first played for Éclair FC in Cameroon.

In October 2023, Ndzana joined French club Reims.

Ndzana signed for Dijon on 9 July 2025.

== International career ==
Ndzana has won the silver medal at the 2019 African Games with the Cameroon women's national under-20 team. She capped at senior level during the 2020 CAF Women's Olympic Qualifying Tournament.

As a futsal player, Ndzana has competed at 2018 Summer Youth Olympics.
