= Ernesto Oliveira =

Portuguese footballer

Personal information
- Full name: Ernesto Nogueira Oliveira
- Date of birth: 28 July 1921
- Place of birth: Lisbon, Portugal
- Date of death: 24 February 2016 (aged 94)
- Position: Goalkeeper

Senior career*
| Years | Team | Apps | (Gls) |
| 1945-1956 | Atlético CP | | |

International career
| 1950–1951 | Portugal | 6 | (0) |
- * Club domestic league appearances and goals

Ernesto Nogueira Oliveira (28 July 1921 – 24 February 2016) was a Portuguese footballer who played as a goalkeeper.

== Football career ==
He played his career for Atlético CP, from 1945/46 to 1955/56. Ernesto gained 6 caps for Portugal and made his debut on 14 May 1950 in Lisbon against England, in a 3-5 defeat.
