= Supertaça de Futsal Feminino de Portugal =

- Founded: 2014
- Region: Portugal
- Teams: 2
- Current champions: Benfica (8th title)
- Most championships: Benfica (8 titles)

The Supertaça de Portugal de Futsal Feminino (English: Portuguese Women's Futsal Supercup) is a futsal cup in Portugal played by the winner of Portuguese Women's Futsal Championship and the winner of Portuguese Women's Futsal Cup.

It was created in 2014 and is organized by the Portuguese Football Federation. The current holders are Benfica, who have won a record eight trophies, seven of which consecutively.

== Supertaça de Portugal finals ==
Year	Winners	Score	Runners-up	Date	Venue
2014	Benfica	6–2	Golpilheira	6 September 2014	Pavilhão de Desportos Municipal do Entroncamento, Entrocamento
2015	Novasemente	7–1	Quinta dos Lombos	30 August 2015	Pavilhão Dr. Salvador Machado, Oliveira de Azeméis
2016	Benfica	7–7 (2–1 p.)	FC Vermoim	8 October 2016	Pavilhão Desportivo Municipal de Loulé, Loulé
2017	Benfica	3–0	Novasemente	2 September 2017	Pavilhão Multidesportos Dr. Mário Mexia, Coimbra
2018	Benfica	4–3	Novasemente	22 September 2018	Pavilhão Eng. Jorge Anjinho, Coimbra
2019	Benfica	4–4 (2–1 p.)	Novasemente	28 September 2019	Pavilhão Municipal de Ponte de Sor, Ponte de Sor
2020	Not held due to the COVID-19 pandemic				
2021	Benfica	1–0	GCR Nun'Álvares	19 September 2021	Pavilhão Cidade de Viseu, Viseu
2022	Benfica	1–1 (4–3 p.)	GCR Nun'Álvares	25 September 2022	Centro de Congressos e Desportos de Matosinhos, Matosinhos
2023	Benfica	4–2	GCR Nun'Álvares	17 September 2023	Pavilhão Municipal de Castelo Branco, Castelo Branco

=== Performance by club ===
Club	Winners	Runners-up	Winning years and Runner-up years
Benfica	8	0	2014, 2016, 2017, 2018, 2019, 2021, 2022, 2023
Novasemente	1	3	2015, 2017, 2018, 2019
Golpilheira	0	1	2014
Quinta dos Lombos	0	1	2015
FC Vermoim	0	1	2016
GCR Nun'Álvares	0	1	2021, 2022, 2023
