= André Correia =

André Correia may refer to:

- André Correia (footballer) (born 1979), Portuguese footballer
- André Correia (futsal player) (born 1998), Portuguese futsal player
