= Benny Wizani =

Austrian trampoline gymnast

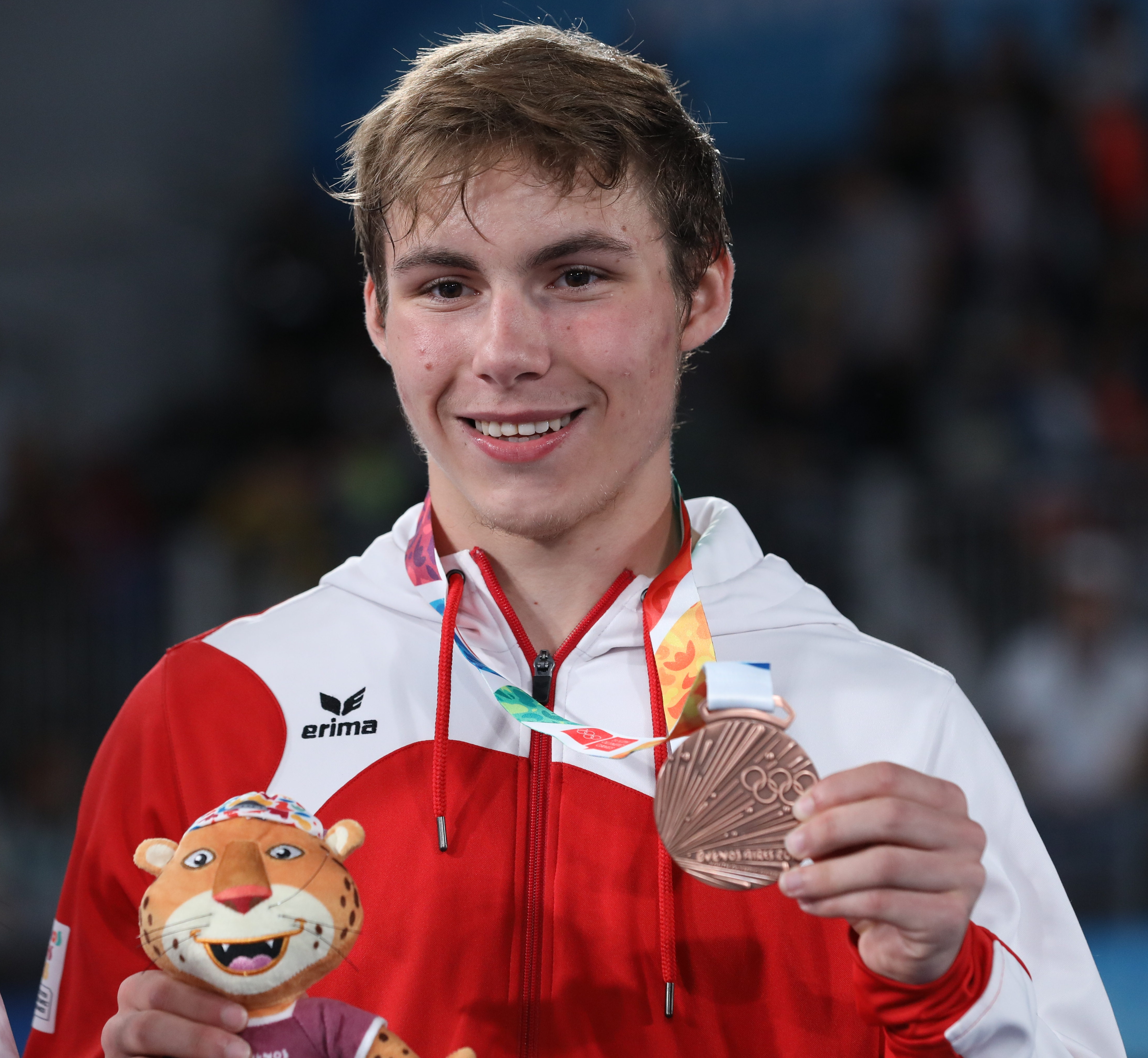
- Wizani at the 2018 Summer Youth Olympics

Personal information
- Full name: Benjamin Wizani
- Born: 26 June 2001 (age 25) Tulln an der Donau, Austria

Gymnastics career
- Discipline: Trampoline gymnastics
- Country represented: Austria
- Club: WAT Brigittenau
- Head coach: Wilfried Wöber
Medal record
Men's trampoline gymnastics
Representing Austria
Youth Olympic Games
Bronze medal – third place	2018 Buenos Aires	Individual

Benjamin Wizani (born 26 June 2001) is an Austrian trampoline gymnast. He is the 2018 Summer Youth Olympics bronze medalist in individual trampoline.

== Early life ==
Wizani grew up in Tulln an der Donau and started trampoline gymnastics at age two. When he was five years old, he started training at WAT Brigittenau under coach Wilfried Wöber.

== Career ==
Wizani competed at his first World Age Group Competition in 2015 and placed seventh in the individual final. He then placed 66th as an individual at the 2017 World Age Group Competitions, and he placed 53rd in the 2018 edition. At the 2018 Junior European Championships, he placed 14th in the individual semi-final.

Wizani won a bronze medal in the individual event at the 2018 Summer Youth Olympics. In April 2019, after missing three months due to a foot injury, he made his senior debut at the Minsk World Cup and finished 28th. He then placed 55th at the 2019 Khabarovsk World Cup and 89th at the Valladolid World Cup. He competed at the 2019 World Championships and placed 12th in the synchronized trampoline qualification round with Niklas Fröschl.

Wizani placed seventh in synchro with Martin Spatt at the 2020 Baku World Cup. He fractured his right arm in 2020 and returned to training three months before the 2021 European Championships where he finished 10th. He placed 29th at the 2021 Brescia World Cup and failed to qualify for the Tokyo Olympic Games. At the 2021 World Championships, he finished 11th in the synchro qualification round with Niklas Fröschl.

Wizani placed 27th in the individual competition at the 2022 Baku World Cup. Then at the Rimini World Cup, he placed 24th as an individual and ninth with Niklas Fröschl in synchro. Wizani and Fröschl qualified for the synchro final at the 2022 World Championships and finished eighth. Wizani and Fröschl finished sixth at the 2023 Santarem World Cup. They then placed 16th at the Coimbra World Cup, and Wizani placed 11th as an individual. He finished fifth at both the Palm Beach and Varna World Cups.

At the 2023 World Championships, Wizani qualified for the individual final in second place and thus earned a berth for the 2024 Summer Olympics. This marked the first time an Austrian trampolinist qualified for the individual final at the Trampoline Gymnastics World Championships. He ultimately placed sixth in the final, which was the best-ever finish for an Austrian trampolinist at the World Championships.

Wizani will represent Austria at the 2024 Summer Olympics and will be the first Austrian male trampolinist to compete at an Olympic Games. He decided to compete at the Olympic Games despite an ACL injury in March.

== Awards ==
Wizani was voted as Gymnast of the Year by the Austrian Gymnastics Federation in 2016, 2018, and 2023.
