= Campeonato Nacional Futsal (women) =

Futsal league in Portugal

Campeonato Nacional
- Country: Portugal
- Confederation: UEFA
- Number of clubs: 16
- Level on pyramid: 1
- Current: 2016-17

The Campeonato Nacional is the top level women's futsal league in Portugal, organized by the Portuguese Football Federation. The competition, which is played under UEFA rules, currently consists of 16 teams.

== Champions ==
The Campeonato Nacional was organized for the first time in season 2013/14 and was won by Golpilheira.

Year	Winner	Runner Up	Third
2013-14	Golpilheira	Vermoim	Avintenses
2014-15	Novasemente	S.L. Benfica	Quinta dos Lombos
2015-16	Vermoim	Sporting CP	S.L. Benfica
2016–17	S.L. Benfica	Sporting CP	Novasemente
2017–18			
