= Taça Nacional Sénior de Futsal Feminino =

Taça Nacional de Futsal Feminino
- Founded: 1996
- Country: Portugal
- Confederation: UEFA
- Number of clubs: 24
- Level on pyramid: 1
- Relegation to: Distritais
- Domestic cup: Taça de Portugal
- Current champions: Belenenses (1st title) (2017–18)
- Most championships: GDC Del Negro (6 titles)
- Website: FPF

The Taça Nacional de Futsal Feminino is the women's futsal second level in Portugal founded in 1996, played under UEFA rules and is operated by the Portuguese Football Federation. It is contested by the 24 winners and the runners-up of best ranked regional leagues (Distritais). The top-four teams are promoted to the next season of the Campeonato Nacional Futsal Feminino.

Until the creation of Campeonato Nacional Futsal Feminino in 2013–14, the Taça Nacional de Futsal Feminino was the premier level in Portuguese women's futsal.

== Format ==
The 24 teams are divided into eight groups (four North and four South) of three teams. The top two teams of each group move to the second phase consisting of four pools (two North and two South) of four teams each. The winner of each group plays the final pool of the title. All four teams are promoted to next season Campeonato Nacional Futsal Feminino. All phases are contested in a round-robin format

== Champions by year ==
| Year | Team |
|---|---|
| 1996–97 | GCD Del Negro |
| 1997–98 | GDR Os Lobinhos |
| 1998–99 | GCD Del Negro |
| 1999–2000 | GCD Del Negro |
| 2000–01 | GCD Del Negro |
| 2001–02 | GSC Novos Talentos |
| 2002–03 | GDC Alto Avilhó |
| 2003–04 | GCD Del Negro |
| 2004–05 | SL Benfica |
| 2005–06 | SL Benfica |
| 2006–07 | SL Benfica |
| 2007–08 | SL Benfica |

| Year | Team |
|---|---|
| 2008–09 | AR Restauradores Avintenses |
| 2009–10 | SL Benfica |
| 2010–11 | FC Vermoim |
| 2011–12 | FC Vermoim |
| 2012–13 | CRC Quinta dos Lombos |
| 2013–14 | Leões Porto Salvo |
| 2014–15 | Sporting CP |
| 2015–16 | GCD Del Negro |
| 2016–17 | Póvoa Futsal |
| 2017–18 | Belenenses |
| 2018–19 | Arneiros |

=== Performance by club ===
| Club | Titles | Years |
|---|---|---|
| GCD Del Negro | 6 | 1996–97 1998–99, 1999–2000, 2000–01, 2003–04, 2015–16 |
| Benfica | 5 | 2004–05, 2005–06, 2006–07, 2007–08, 2009–10 |
| FC Vermoim | 2 | 2010–11, 2011–12 |
| GDR Os Lobinhos | 1 | 1997–98 |
| GSC Novos Talentos | 1 | 2001–02 |
| GDC Alto Avilhó | 1 | 2002–03 |
| AR Restauradores Avintenses | 1 | 2008–09 |
| CRC Quinta dos Lombos | 1 | 2012–13 |
| Leões Porto Salvo | 1 | 2013–14 |
| Sporting CP | 1 | 2014–15 |
| Póvoa Futsal | 1 | 2016–17 |
| Belenenses | 1 | 2017–18 |
| Arneiros | 1 | 2018–19 |
