= CeNARD =

Sport venue in Buenos Aires, Argentina

Coordinates: 34°32′33.4″S 58°27′14.1″W

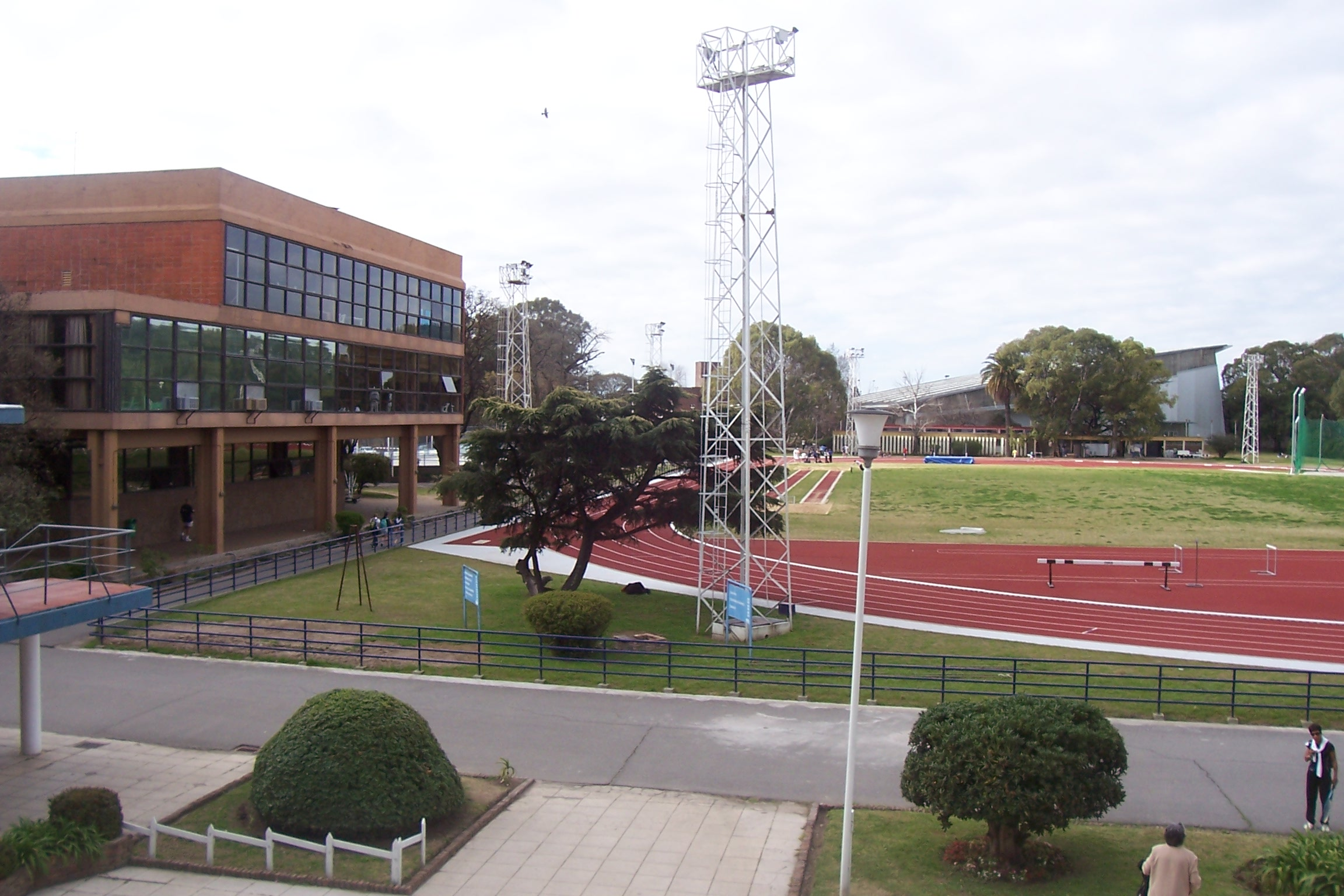
The Ce.N.A.R.D.

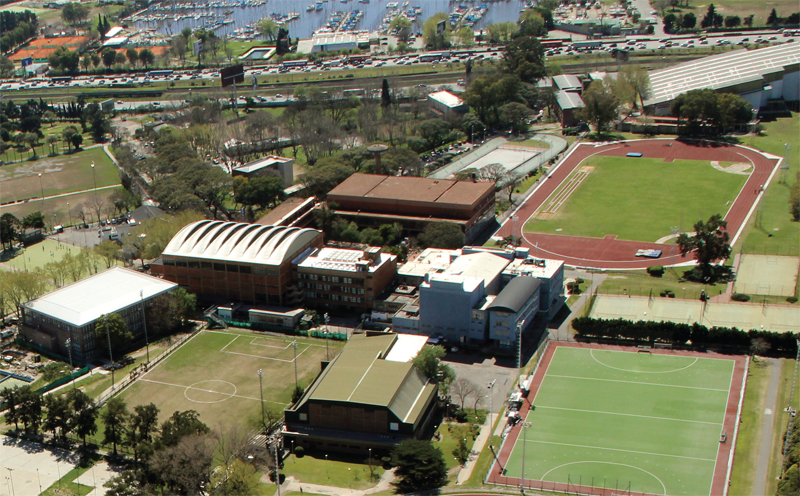

The National Center of High Performance Athletics (known as Ce.N.A.R.D. for its initials in Spanish: Centro Nacional de Alto Rendimiento Deportivo) is the sports complex where most Argentine sportspeople (especially athletes) who compete internationally are trained.

The CeNARD is located at 1050 Crisólogo Larralde Avenue, in the Núñez district of Buenos Aires, Argentina. The area where it is located, facing the Río de la Plata, was the site of the Carl Diem Gymnasium from 1954 until 1960, and the CeNARD was built between 1973 and 1980. The establishment occupies an approximated land area of 11.5 hectares (28 acres).

The center also houses the Argentine Sports Secretariat and a gymnasium with a seating capacity for 2,000 spectators. The smaller Humberto Selvetti Gymnasium hosts amateur boxing competitions, and the center also houses numerous tennis courts, track and field, javelin and field hockey venues, indoor arenas, an olympic-sized swimming pool and a fully equipped medical center.

It was the main sports site of the 2006 South American Games and one venue of the 2018 Summer Youth Olympics.

== See also ==
- Sport in Argentina
