= Campeonato Nacional Futsal Feminino =

Futsal league in Portugal

Campeonato Nacional de Futsal Feminino
- Founded: 1996
- Country: Portugal
- Confederation: UEFA
- Number of clubs: 16
- Level on pyramid: 1
- Relegation to: Distritais
- Domestic cup: Taça Nacional
- Current champions: Benfica (5th title) (2021–22)
- Most championships: Benfica (5 titles)
- Website: FPF

The Campeonato Nacional de Futsal Feminino is the women's premier futsal league in Portugal. It is organised by the Portuguese Football Federation and, therefore, played under UEFA's rules.

It was created in the 2013–14 season, joining Portugal's 16 best teams, and is disputed in a regular phase divided in two geographic zones, North and South, followed by a second phase with a poule contested by the top-four teams in each zone. The remaining teams contest one relegation poule for each zone, with the two lower teams of each group being relegated to the regional leagues (distritais). Each season, four teams are promoted from the previous edition of the Taça Nacional de Futsal Feminino.

Between 1996 and 2013, the national champions were the winners of the Taça Nacional (then the only national women's competition), which was contested by the winners of the regional leagues. Benfica are the current Portuguese champions, having won five consecutive league titles.

== Champions by year ==
Club									Players		
Season	Champions	Points	2nd place	Points	3rd place	Points	Teams	Rounds	Top scorer	Club	Goals
2013–14	CR Golpilheira	33	FC Vermoim	27	Restauradores Avintenses	26	16	28			
2014–15	Novasemente GD	35	Benfica	34	CRC Quinta dos Lombos	21	16	28			
2015–16	FC Vermoim	38	Sporting CP	27	Benfica	25	16	28			
2016–17	Benfica	36	Sporting CP	33	Novasemente GD	32	16	28			
2017–18	Benfica	36	Sporting CP	33	Novasemente GD	32	16	28	(Portugal) Taninha	Sporting CP	17
2018–19	Benfica	40	CRC Quinta dos Lombos	29	Novasemente GD	28	16	28	(Portugal) Carla Silva	Santa Luzia	29
2020–21	Benfica										
2021–22	Benfica		Nun'Álvares								

=== Performance by club ===
Club	Champions	2nd place	3rd place	Champions season(s)	2nd place season(s)	3rd place season(s)
Benfica	5	1	1	2016–17, 2017–18, 2018–19, 2020–21, 2021–22	2014–15	2015–16
Novasemente GD	1	0	3	2014–15	-	2016–17, 2017–18, 2018–19
FC Vermoim	1	1	0	2015–16	2013–14	-
CR Golpilheira	1	0	0	2013–14	-	-
Sporting CP	0	3	0	-	2015–16, 2016–17, 2017–18	-
CRC Quinta dos Lombos	0	1	1	-	2018–19	2014–15
Restauradores Avintenses	0	0	1	-	-	2013–14
Nun'Álvares	0	0	1	-	-	2021–22
