= FC Vermoim =

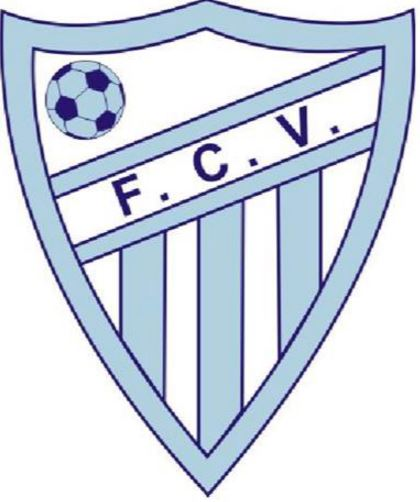
- Full name: Futbol Clube Vermoim
- Founded: 1991
- Chairman: Francisco José Machado Correia Paiva
- League: Campeonato Nacional
- Website: https://www.facebook.com/futebolclubevermoim/

Futbol Clube Vermoim is a Campeonato Nacional women's futsal club based in Vermoim.

== History ==
The club won the Portuguese championship in season 2015-2016.

In 2017, the team will participate in the European Women's Futsal Tournament together with the champions from Italy, Spain, Russia, Ukraine and the Netherlands.

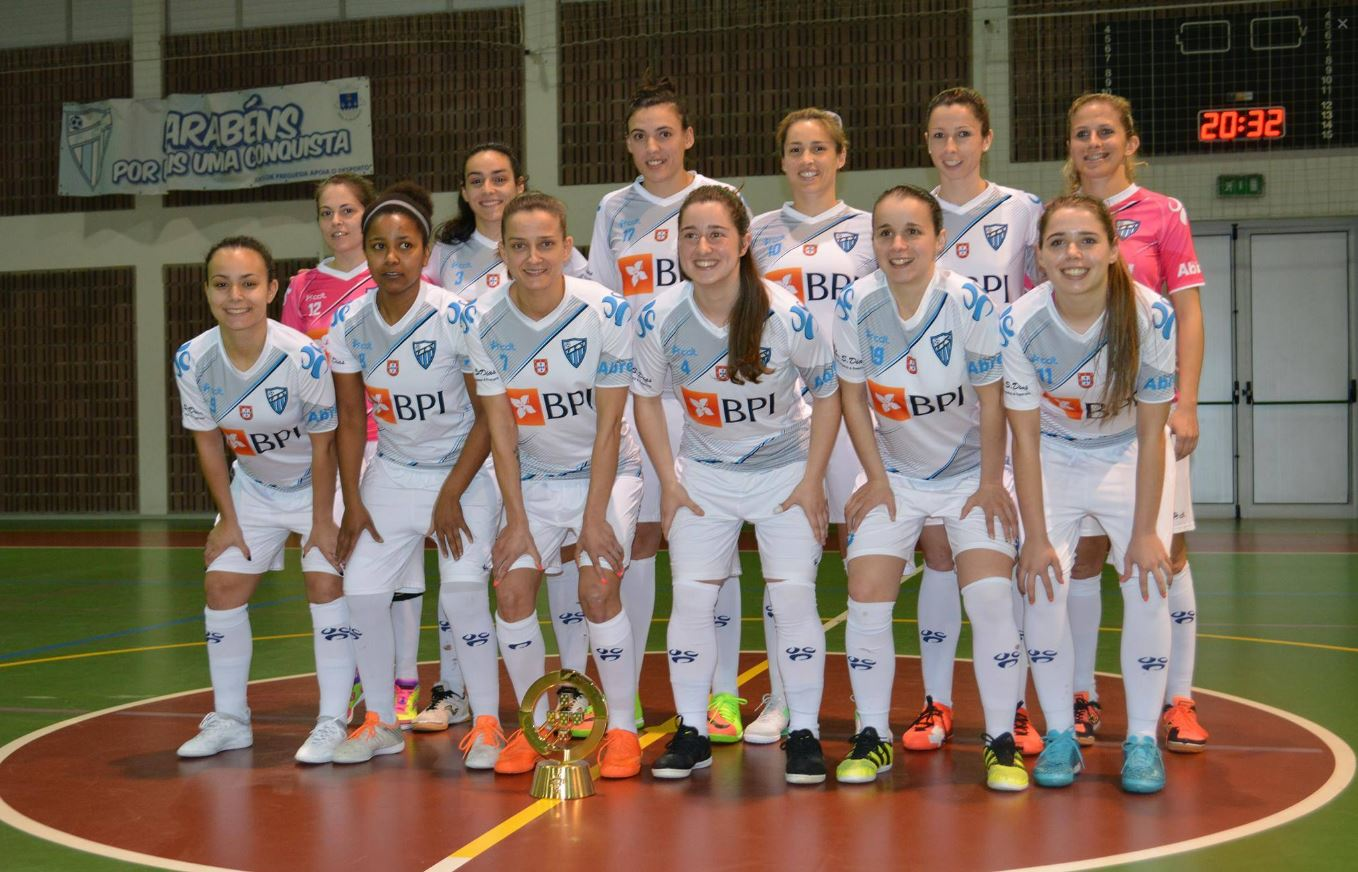
2017 Team Photo FC Vermoim
