= Taça de Portugal de Futsal Feminino =

- Founded: 2013–14
- Region: Portugal
- Teams: 125
- Current champions: Benfica (8th title)
- Most championships: Benfica (8 titles)

The Taça de Portugal de Futsal Feminino (English: Portuguese Women's Futsal Cup) is the main Portuguese national women's futsal knock-out competition.

It was created in 2013–14 season and is organized by the Portuguese Football Federation. The current holders are Benfica, who have won a record seven trophies, five of which consecutively.

== Taça de Portugal finals ==
Season	Winners	Score	Runners-up
2013–14	Benfica	5–0	Quinta dos Lombos
2014–15	Quinta dos Lombos	2–1	Novasemente
2015–16	Benfica	3–2 (a.e.t.)	Sporting CP
2016–17	Benfica	4–3 (a.e.t.)	Novasemente
2017–18	Benfica	3–1	Novasemente
2018–19	Benfica	2–0	Novasemente
2019–20	Benfica	5–0	Chaves
2021–22	Nun'Álvares	1–1 (4–1 p.)	Benfica
2022–23	Benfica	4–1	Nun'Álvares
2023–24	Benfica	8–0	Torreense

=== Performance by club ===
Club	Winners	Runners-up	Winning years and Runner-up years
Benfica	8	1	2013–14, 2015–16, 2016–17, 2017–18, 2018–19, 2019–20, 2022–23, 2023–24
Quinta dos Lombos	1	1	2014–15, 2013–14
Nun'Álvares	1	1	2021–22, 2022–23
Novasemente	0	4	2014–15, 2016–17, 2017–18, 2018–19
Sporting CP	0	1	2015–16
Chaves	0	1	2019–20
Torreense	0	1	2023–24
