= Vietnam national futsal team results =

Futsal results list

These are the Vietnam national futsal team results, including FIFA approved and unofficial friendly matches. Only FIFA's approval will be used in calculation of Futsal World Ranking.

== 1997 ==
4 December 1997 Tiger 5s Futsal Tournament GS	Italy	11–1	Vietnam	Kallang, Singapore
--:-- UTC+6		Report		Stadium: Singapore Indoor Stadium

5 December 1997 Tiger 5s Futsal Tournament GS	Iran	14–2	Vietnam	Kallang, Singapore
--:-- UTC+6		Report		Stadium: Singapore Indoor Stadium

6 December 1997 Tiger 5s Futsal Tournament GS	Vietnam	2–5	Spain	Kallang, Singapore
--:-- UTC+6		Report		Stadium: Singapore Indoor Stadium

7 December 1997 Tiger 5s Futsal Tournament 7th place	Vietnam	2–1	Singapore	Kallang, Singapore
17:30 UTC+6		Report		Stadium: Singapore Indoor Stadium

== 2005 ==
31 March 2005 Hybrid friendly	Vietnam	3–1	(Vietnam) National University of Physical Education and Sports II	Ho Chi Minh City, Vietnam
--:-- UTC+7		Report		Stadium: Lãnh Bình Thăng

2 May 2005 AFF Championship GS	Indonesia	5–2	Vietnam	Bangkok, Thailand
16:00 UTC+7				Stadium: Hua Mark Indoor Stadium

3 May 2005 AFF Championship GS	Vietnam	1–6	Malaysia	Bangkok, Thailand
14:00 UTC+7				Stadium: Hua Mark Indoor Stadium

4 May 2005 AFF Championship GS	Vietnam	3–5	Brunei	Bangkok, Thailand
14:00 UTC+7				Stadium: Hua Mark Indoor Stadium

5 May 2005 AFF Championship GS	Thailand	13–2	Vietnam	Bangkok, Thailand
18:00 UTC+7				Stadium: Hua Mark Indoor Stadium

6 May 2005 AFF Championship GS	Vietnam	4–5	Philippines	Bangkok, Thailand
14:00 UTC+7				Stadium: Hua Mark Indoor Stadium

7 May 2005 AFF Championship 5th place	Philippines	0–5	Vietnam	Bangkok, Thailand
11:30 UTC+7				Stadium: Hua Mark Indoor Stadium

19 May 2005 Friendly	Vietnam	0–7	Japan	Ho Chi Minh City, Vietnam
--:-- UTC+7		Report		Stadium: Phú Thọ Indoor Stadium

22 May 2005 AFC Championship GS	Kyrgyzstan	4–1	Vietnam	Ho Chi Minh City, Vietnam
15:00 UTC+7	Kenjisariev 3', 9', 18'; Pestriakov 13'		Lê Quốc Khương 14'	Stadium: Phú Thọ Indoor Stadium; Attendance: 2,200; Referee: Adel Al-Shatti (Kuwait)

24 May 2005 AFC Championship GS	Vietnam	1–1	Hong Kong	Ho Chi Minh City, Vietnam
18:30 UTC+7	Lê Quốc Khương 9'		Kwan Yee Lo 20' (pen.)	Stadium: Phú Thọ Indoor Stadium; Referee: Li Zhizhong (China)

25 May 2005 AFC Championship GS	Vietnam	1–8	Iraq	Ho Chi Minh City, Vietnam
18:30 UTC+7	Nguyễn Tuấn Thành 2'		Naji 6', 7', 36'; Ghazi 22', 26'; Safi 25'; Kamel 33', 34'	Stadium: Quân khu 7 Stadium; Referee: Kazuya Isokawa (Japan)

28 May 2005 AFC Championship GS2	Iraq	1–0	Vietnam	Ho Chi Minh City, Vietnam
18:30 UTC+7	Kamel 10'			Stadium: Quân khu 7 Stadium; Referee: Fusaya Suzuki (Japan)

30 May 2005 AFC Championship GS2	Vietnam	6–3	Bhutan	Ho Chi Minh City, Vietnam
15:00 UTC+7	Nguyễn Tuấn Thành 4', 5' (?); Nguyễn Hồng Sơn 16'; Lê Quốc Khương 7' (?)		? 14' ? 20'; Pema 22'	Stadium: Quân khu 7 Stadium; Referee: Badrul Hisham Kalam (Malaysia)

31 May 2005 AFC Championship GS2	Vietnam	4–2	Philippines	Ho Chi Minh City, Vietnam
18:30 UTC+7	Dương Minh Châu (?); Nguyễn Tuấn Thành (?); Lê Quốc Khương 25'		Espinosa (?); Nejadnafavi (?)	Stadium: Quân khu 7 Stadium; Referee: Mohammad Al-Haddad (Kuwait

== 2006 ==
18 April 2006 AFC Championship qualifiers	Vietnam	4–4	Cambodia	Kuantan, Malaysia
--:-- UTC+8				Stadium: Kuantan Indoor Stadium

18 April 2006 AFC Championship qualifiers	Malaysia	8–6	Vietnam	Kuantan, Malaysia
--:-- UTC+8				Stadium: Kuantan Indoor Stadium

21 April 2006 AFC Championship qualifiers	Turkmenistan	2–0	Vietnam	Kuantan, Malaysia
--:-- UTC+8				Stadium: Kuantan Indoor Stadium

22 April 2006 AFC Championship qualifiers	Vietnam	5–0	Maldives	Kuantan, Malaysia
--:-- UTC+8				Stadium: Kuantan Indoor Stadium

2 May 2006 AFF Championship GS	Vietnam	3–6	Indonesia	Bangkok, Thailand
16:00 UTC+7				Stadium: Hua Mark Indoor Stadium

3 May 2006 AFF Championship GS	Vietnam	4–9	Malaysia	Bangkok, Thailand
16:00 UTC+7				Stadium: Hua Mark Indoor Stadium

4 May 2006 AFF Championship GS	Cambodia	8–6	Vietnam	Bangkok, Thailand
14:00 UTC+7				Stadium: Hua Mark Indoor Stadium

== 2007 ==
26 March 2007 AFF Championship GS	Vietnam	3–13	Thailand	Bangkok, Thailand
16:00 UTC+7				Stadium: Hua Mark Indoor Stadium

27 March 2007 AFF Championship GS	Brunei	0–6	Vietnam	Bangkok, Thailand
12:00 UTC+7				Stadium: Hua Mark Indoor Stadium

28 March 2007 AFF Championship GS	Myanmar	4–6	Vietnam	Bangkok, Thailand
14:00 UTC+7				Stadium: Hua Mark Indoor Stadium

30 March 2007 AFF Championship SF	Australia	4–1	Vietnam	Bangkok, Thailand
16:00 UTC+7				Stadium: Hua Mark Indoor Stadium

31 March 2007 AFF Championship 3rd place	Vietnam	6–6 (a.e.t.) (1–3 p)	Malaysia	Bangkok, Thailand
16:00 UTC+7				Stadium: Hua Mark Indoor Stadium

26 October 2007 AIMAG GS	Hong Kong	1–5	Vietnam	São Lázaro, Macau
14:00 UTC+8	So Sheung Kwai 36'	Report	Nguyễn Bảo Quân 16', 39'; Huỳnh Bá Tuấn 23'; Phạm Minh Giang 29'; Huỳnh Đông Kha 40'	Stadium: Tap Seac Multi-sports Pavilion; Referee: Kazuya Isokawa (Japan)

28 October 2007 AIMAG GS	Uzbekistan	7–1	Vietnam	Sé, Macau
17:00 UTC+8	Muhitdinov 17'; Tojiboev 19'; Ahunbabaev 23', 35'; Own goal 26'; Elibaev 30'; Anorov 39'	Report	Huỳnh Đông Kha 33'	Stadium: IPM Multisport Pavilion; Referee: Abdulrahman Abdulqader (Bahrain)

30 October 2007 AIMAG GS	Vietnam	0–2	Japan	Sé, Macau
15:00 UTC+8		Report	Yoshinari 3'; Jin 18'	Stadium: IPM Multisport Pavilion; Referee: Prakongsuk Kuamala (Thailand)

7 December 2007 SEA Games GS	Indonesia	2–1	Vietnam	Nakhon Ratchasima, Thailand
14:00 UTC+7	Saputra 25'; Handoyo 33'		Hà Bảo Minh 21'	Stadium: Liptapanlop Hall; Referee: Badrul Hishan Kalam (Malaysia)

8 December 2007 SEA Games GS	Vietnam	2–4	Laos	Nakhon Ratchasima, Thailand
14:00 UTC+7	Huỳnh Bá Tuấn 4'; Hà Bảo Minh 23'		Vongchiengkham 7'; Ketsada 10', 39'; Phonepaseuth 31'	Stadium: Liptapanlop Hall; Referee: Silva Sengkaran Munlandy (Malaysia)

== 2008 ==
26 March 2008 AFC Championship qualifiers	Malaysia	4–4	Vietnam	Shah Alam, Malaysia
12:00 UTC+8	Fe. Karnim 8', 39'; Zainal 35', 39'		Đoàn Đình Hồng 2'; Nguyễn Quang Minh 4'; Ngô Anh Dũng 28'; Huỳnh Đông Kha 40'	Stadium: Matsushita Sports Complex; Attendance: 100; Referee: Christopher Colley (Australia)

27 March 2008 AFC Championship qualifiers	Vietnam	4–8	Chinese Taipei	Shah Alam, Malaysia
12:00 UTC+8	Nguyễn Quang Minh 5'; Huỳnh Bá Tuấn 23', 36'; Nguyễn Anh Khoa 33'		Kuo Yin-hung 11'; Chen Bing-shin 11', 26'; Huang Chiu-ching 12'; Wang Yung-lun 18' (pen.), 38'; Lo Wen-hao 33'; Fang Ching-jen 37'	Stadium: Matsushita Sports Complex; Attendance: 300; Referee: Husein Khalaileh (Jordan)

28 March 2008 AFC Championship qualifiers	Vietnam	4–2	Maldives	Shah Alam, Malaysia
14:00 UTC+8	Nguyễn Minh Tuấn 9', 19', 34'; Nguyễn Đình Hoàng 28'		V. Ahmed 23', 24'	Stadium: Matsushita Sports Complex; Attendance: 50; Referee: Nurdin Bukuev (Kyrgyzstan)

27 August 2008 AFF Championship GS	Vietnam	5–4	Brunei	Bangkok, Thailand
16:00 UTC+7	Trương Quốc Tuấn 22'; Huỳnh Bá Tuấn 25', 27'; Phạm Minh Giang 31'; Karim 35' (o.g.)		Ismail 3'; Zainy 21', 24'; Johari 38'	Stadium: Nimibutr Stadium

28 August 2008 AFF Championship GS	Laos	5–2	Vietnam	Bangkok, Thailand
12:00 UTC+7	Dalaphone 7'; Sayakone 14'; Thongmany 23'; Douangmatphon 35'; Sysoutham 39'		Trương Quốc Tuấn 9'; Nguyễn Quang Minh 38'	Stadium: Nimibutr Stadium

29 August 2008 AFF Championship GS	Vietnam	2–3	Malaysia	Bangkok, Thailand
12:00 UTC+7	Nguyễn Quang Minh 25'; Trương Quốc Tuấn 35'		Yusoff 7'; Karnim 14'; Zainal 39'	Stadium: Nimibutr Stadium

== 2009 ==
16 May 2009 Hybrid friendly	CAT Telecom (Thailand)	8–4	Vietnam	Bangkok, Thailand
--:-- UTC+7		Report

18 May 2009 Hybrid friendly	North Bangkok University (Thailand)	2–9	Vietnam	Bangkok, Thailand
--:-- UTC+7		Report

20 May 2009 Hybrid friendly	Bangkok (Thailand)	3–3	Vietnam	Bangkok, Thailand
--:-- UTC+7		Report

22 May 2009 Friendly	Thailand	3–3	Vietnam	Bangkok, Thailand
--:-- UTC+7		Report

23 May 2009 Hybrid friendly	I Am Sport (Thailand)	6–3	Vietnam	Bangkok, Thailand
--:-- UTC+7		Report

8 June 2009 AFF Championship GS	Philippines	0–3	Vietnam	Ho Chi Minh City, Vietnam
18:00 UTC+7			Huỳnh Bá Tuấn 5'; Nguyễn Quốc Bình 24'; Nguyễn Bảo Quân 25'	Stadium: Phú Thọ Indoor Stadium

9 June 2009 AFF Championship GS	Vietnam	Cancelled	Brunei	Ho Chi Minh City, Vietnam
18:00 UTC+7				Stadium: Phú Thọ Indoor Stadium

10 June 2009 AFF Championship GS	Vietnam	21–1	Timor-Leste	Ho Chi Minh City, Vietnam
18:00 UTC+7	Huỳnh Bá Tuấn 2'; Hà Bảo Minh 5'; Ngô Anh Dũng 8', 19', 20', 22', 23', 33'; Huỳnh Đồng Kha 9', 16', 19', 24', 27', 28'; Nguyễn Quỗc Bình 11'; Nguyễn Bảo Quân 12', 31', 35'; Phạm Minh Giang 18', 32'; Nguyễn Quốc Bảo 38'		Ximenes 24'	Stadium: Phú Thọ Indoor Stadium

12 June 2009 AFF Championship SF	Vietnam	3–3 (a.e.t.) (8–7 p)	Indonesia	Ho Chi Minh City, Vietnam
17:00 UTC+7	Nguyễn Quốc Bình 20'; Nguyễn Bảo Quân 27' (pen.), 32'		Alfiansyah 23'; Sayan 24', 38' (pen.)	Stadium: Phú Thọ Indoor Stadium

14 June 2009 AFF Championship F	Thailand	4–1	Vietnam	Ho Chi Minh City, Vietnam
17:00 UTC+7	Suphawut 1'; Na-tee 17', 26'; Nattawut 35'		Ngô Anh Dũng 38'	Stadium: Phú Thọ Indoor Stadium; Attendance: 5,000

6 October 2009 Hybrid friendly	BBS (Japan)	Unknown	Vietnam	Shiga, Japan
--:-- UTC+9		Report

7 October 2009 Hybrid friendly	Deução Kobe (Japan)	Unknown	Vietnam	Shiga, Japan
--:-- UTC+9		Report

8 October 2009 Hybrid friendly	Shriker Osaka (Japan)	Unknown	Vietnam	Shiga, Japan
--:-- UTC+9		Report

10 October 2009 Hybrid friendly	Kintetsu (Japan)	Unknown	Vietnam	Shiga, Japan
--:-- UTC+9		Report

28 October 2009 AIMAG GS	Vietnam	2–8	Malaysia	Ho Chi Minh City, Vietnam
16:00 UTC+7	Nguyễn Bảo Quân 2', 32'		Kadir 5', 24'; Haris 8', 32'; Zainuddin 22'; Zainal 26', 26'; Abdul Aziz 36'	Stadium: Phú Thọ Indoor Stadium; Referee: Naoki Miyatani (Japan)

30 October 2009 AIMAG GS	Bahrain	4–4	Vietnam	Ho Chi Minh City, Vietnam
16:00 UTC+7	Darwish 5', 17', 34'; Abdulla 25'		Nguyễn Trọng Thiện 25'; Nguyễn Hoàng Giang 25' (pen.); Trương Quốc Tuấn 33', 40'	Stadium: Phú Thọ Indoor Stadium; Referee: Shukhrat Pulatov (Uzbekistan)

1 November 2009 AIMAG GS	Vietnam	3–6	Jordan	Ho Chi Minh City, Vietnam
16:00 UTC+7	Huỳnh Bá Tuấn 5'; Nguyễn Hoàng Giang 25'; Trương Quốc Tuấn 35' (pen.)		Al-Zuod 7', 15', 34', 36'; Samih 8'; Abu Arab 12'	Stadium: Phú Thọ Indoor Stadium; Referee: Vahid Arzpeima (Iran)

== 2010 ==
20 February 2010 AFC Championship qualifiers	Vietnam	12–2	Cambodia	Jakarta, Indonesia
18:30 UTC+7	Trần Quang Duy 8', 39'; Nguyễn Quốc Bảo 11', 30'; Nguyễn Bảo Quân 11', 32'; Nguyễn Hoàng Giang 16', 39'; Nguyễn Trọng Thiện 18'; Phạm Minh Giang 29'; Nguyễn Đình Hoàng 32'; Nguyễn Quang Minh 33'		Dor Vireak 18'; Ouk Sereyratanak 28'	Stadium: Tennis Indoor Stadium; Attendance: 100; Referee: Nurdin Bukuev (Kyrgyzstan)

21 February 2010 AFC Championship qualifiers	Philippines	1–4	Vietnam	Jakarta, Indonesia
16:15 UTC+7	Bahadoran 40'		Ngô Duy Khánh 6'; Zerrudo 27' (o.g.); Nguyễn Quốc Bảo 33'; Phạm Minh Giang 34'	Stadium: Tennis Indoor Stadium; Attendance: 700; Referee: Kim Jang-kwan (South Korea)

22 February 2010 AFC Championship qualifiers	Malaysia	2–2	Vietnam	Jakarta, Indonesia
16:15 UTC+7	Noor 31'; Effendy 33'		Nguyễn Trọng Thiện 10'; Trương Quốc Tuấn 12'	Stadium: Tennis Indoor Stadium; Attendance: 750; Referee: Hla Min (Myanmar)

24 February 2010 AFC Championship qualifiers	Australia	4–1	Vietnam	Jakarta, Indonesia
16:15 UTC+7	Fernando 16', 39'; Seeto 18', 31'		Trương Quốc Tuấn 21'	Stadium: Tennis Indoor Stadium; Attendance: 360; Referee: Siva Sangkaran Muniady (Malaysia)

25 February 2010 AFC Championship qualifiers	Malaysia	3–6 (a.e.t.)	Vietnam	Jakarta, Indonesia
16:15 UTC+7	Kadir 12'; Zainal 14'; Effendy 24'		Ngô Duy Khánh 5', 50', 50', 50'; Nguyễn Hoàng Giang 19', 40'	Stadium: Tennis Indoor Stadium; Attendance: 450; Referee: Scott Kidson (Australia)

5 April 2010 AFF Championship GS	Vietnam	8–1	Myanmar	Ho Chi Minh City, Vietnam
16:00 UTC+7	Trương Quốc Tuấn 12', 19', 24'; Nguyễn Hoàng Giang 13'; Hà Bảo Minh 30', 39'; Nguyễn Quốc Bảo 34'; Ngô Anh Dũng 35'		Htein Lin 7'	Stadium: Phu Tho Stadium

6 April 2010 AFF Championship GS	Philippines	0–4	Vietnam	Ho Chi Minh City, Vietnam
14:00 UTC+7			Nguyễn Bảo Quân (?), 23'; Nguyễn Quốc Bảo 18'; Huỳnh Bá Tuấn 22'	Stadium: Phu Tho Stadium

8 April 2010 AFF Championship GS	Vietnam	1–2	Indonesia	Ho Chi Minh City, Vietnam
16:00 UTC+7	Huỳnh Bá Tuấn 18'		Đặng Phước Anh (?); Sayan (?)	Stadium: Phu Tho Stadium

9 April 2010 AFF Championship GS	Vietnam	0–2	Malaysia	Ho Chi Minh City, Vietnam
16:00 UTC+7			Ruzaley 38'; S. Devandran (?)	Stadium: Phu Tho Stadium

12 May 2010 Hybrid friendly	El Espinar (Spain)	5–4	Vietnam	El Espinar, Spain
--:-- UTC+2		Report

14 May 2010 Hybrid friendly	San Agustín (Spain)	5–4	Vietnam	San Agustín del Guadalix, Spain
--:-- UTC+2		Report

16 May 2010 Hybrid friendly	Segovia B (Spain)	2–2	Vietnam	Segovia, Spain
--:-- UTC+2		Report

18 May 2010 Hybrid friendly	Cuéllar (Spain)	0–2	Vietnam	Cuéllar, Spain
--:-- UTC+2		Report

23 May 2010 AFC Championship GS	Vietnam	7–3	South Korea	Tashkent, Uzbekistan
17:30 UTC+4	Nguyễn Trọng Thiện 4', 10', 23'; Nguyễn Hoàng Giang 32'; Trần Hoàng Vinh 37'; Huỳnh Bá Tuấn 38', 40'		Kim Jeong-nam 3', 33'; Shin Jong-hoon 31'	Stadium: IT University Complex; Attendance: 500; Referee: Christopher Colley (Australia)

24 May 2010 AFC Championship GS	Kyrgyzstan	4–2	Vietnam	Tashkent, Uzbekistan
12:30 UTC+4	Kadyrov 15', 39'; Abdurazakov 19'; Djetybaev 24'		Trần Hoàng Vinh 27', 34'	Stadium: IT University Complex; Attendance: 500; Referee: Kazuya Isokawa (Japan)

25 May 2010 AFC Championship GS	Thailand	5–2	Vietnam	Tashkent, Uzbekistan
17:30 UTC+4	Thueanklang 3', 11'; Thusiri 15'; Trương Quốc Tuấn 29' (o.g.); Issarasuwipakorn 33'		Nguyễn Quốc Bảo 9'; Trương Quốc Tuấn 35'	Stadium: Uzbekistan Sports Complex; Attendance: 200; Referee: Vadim Baratov (Turkmenistan)

12 November 2010 Hanoi Tournament	Vietnam	3–2	Thailand B	Hanoi, Vietnam
--:-- UTC+7		Report		Stadium: Quần Ngựa Sports Complex

13 November 2010 Hanoi Tournament	Chinese Taipei	0–2	Vietnam	Hanoi, Vietnam
--:-- UTC+7		Report		Stadium: Quần Ngựa Sports Complex

14 November 2010 Hanoi Tournament	Vietnam	3–1	Qatar	Hanoi, Vietnam
--:-- UTC+7		Report		Stadium: Quần Ngựa Sports Complex

7 December 2010 Friendly	Thailand	9–1	Vietnam	Bangkok, Thailand
--:-- UTC+7

9 December 2010 Friendly	Thailand	7–0	Vietnam	Bangkok, Thailand
--:-- UTC+7

10 December 2010 Friendly	Vietnam	2–5	Japan	Bangkok, Thailand
--:-- UTC+7

== 2011 ==
26 April 2011 Friendly	China	3–2	Vietnam	Hangzhou, China
--:-- UTC+8		Report

27 April 2011 Friendly	China	2–0	Vietnam	Hangzhou, China
--:-- UTC+8		Report

27 May 2011 Friendly	Uzbekistan B	3–1	Vietnam	Tashkent, Uzbekistan
--:-- UTC+5		Report

29 May 2011 Ardus Cup	Ardus (Uzbekistan)	4–2	Vietnam	Tashkent, Uzbekistan
--:-- UTC+5		Report

29 May 2011 Ardus Cup	Vietnam	2–8	(Azerbaijan) Neftçi	Tashkent, Uzbekistan
--:-- UTC+5		Report

31 May 2011 Ardus Cup	Norilsk Nickel (Russia)	8–1	Vietnam	Tashkent, Uzbekistan
--:-- UTC+5		Report

7 October 2011 Hanoi Tournament	Vietnam	2–0	China	Hanoi, Vietnam
--:-- UTC+7		Report		Stadium: Quần Ngựa Sports Complex

8 October 2011 Hanoi Tournament	Qatar	4–2	Vietnam	Hanoi, Vietnam
--:-- UTC+7		Report		Stadium: Quần Ngựa Sports Complex

9 October 2011 Hanoi Tournament	Vietnam	2–3	Uzbekistan	Hanoi, Vietnam
--:-- UTC+7		Report		Stadium: Quần Ngựa Sports Complex

26 October 2011 Hybrid friendly	Jaén (Spain)	2–1	Vietnam	Jaén, Spain
--:-- UTC+2		Report		Stadium: Pabellón La Salobreja

31 October 2011 Hybrid friendly	Alchoyano (Spain)	3–3	Vietnam	Albolote, Spain
--:-- UTC+2		Report		Attendance: 500

2 November 2011 Hybrid friendly	Nazareno (Spain)	Cancelled	Vietnam	Dos Hermanas, Spain
--:-- UTC+2		Report

5 November 2011 Friendly	Qatar	3–0	Vietnam	Doha, Qatar
--:-- UTC+4		Report

6 November 2011 Friendly	Qatar	Cancelled	Vietnam	Doha, Qatar
--:-- UTC+4		Report

17 November 2011 SEA Games GS	Indonesia	2–2	Vietnam	Jakarta, Indonesia
15:30 UTC+7	Saputra 7'; Hairul 35'		Nguyễn Hoàng Giang 23'; Trần Hoàng Vinh 33'	Stadium: POPKI Sports Hall

19 November 2011 SEA Games GS	Vietnam	7–1	Philippines	Jakarta, Indonesia
15:30 UTC+7	Nguyễn Bảo Quân 10'; Lưu Quỳnh Toàn 14', 39'; Nguyễn Hoàng Giang 24', 34'; Nguyễn Quốc Bảo 29'; Phùng Trọng Luân 30'		Zerrudo 13'	Stadium: POPKI Sports Hall

21 November 2011 SEA Games SF	Vietnam	3–2 (a.e.t.)	Malaysia	Jakarta, Indonesia
15:00 UTC+7	Nguyễn Bảo Quân 28'; Trần Hoàng Vinh 43'; Lưu Quỳnh Toàn 46'		Haniffa 37'; Asmie 44'	Stadium: POPKI Sports Hall

22 November 2011 SEA Games F	Vietnam	3–8	Thailand	Jakarta, Indonesia
16:00 UTC+7	Nguyễn Thiên Trọng 31'; Phùng Trọng Luân 32'; Trần Hoàng Vinh 35'		Suphawut 2', 30'; Kritsada 11', 34', 39'; Sermphan 11'; Lertchai 28'; Jirawat 39'	Stadium: POPKI Sports Hall

== 2012 ==
21 February 2012 AFC Championship qualifiers	Vietnam	4–0	Malaysia	Bangkok, Thailand
14:00 UTC+7	Lưu Quỳnh Toàn 32'; Nguyễn Trọng Thiện 35', 38'; Đặng Phước Anh 39'			Stadium: Krungthep Thonburi Indoor Stadium; Referee: Kim Jang-kwan (South Korea)

22 February 2012 AFC Championship qualifiers	Cambodia	1–7	Vietnam	Bangkok, Thailand
14:00 UTC+7	Phang Sunly 28'		Huỳnh Bá Tuấn 10', 18'; Nguyễn Trọng Thiện 12'; Nguyễn Bảo Quân 20', 35'; Lưu Quỳnh Toàn 33', 40'	Stadium: Krungthep Thonburi Indoor Stadium; Referee: Jasim Eidi (United Arab Emirates)

23 February 2012 AFC Championship qualifiers	Australia	2–2	Vietnam	Bangkok, Thailand
14:00 UTC+7	Phùng Trọng Luân 13' (o.g.); Zeballos 32'		Lưu Quỳnh Toàn 24'; Nguyễn Trọng Thiện 36'	Stadium: Krungthep Thonburi Indoor Stadium; Referee: Kim Jang-kwan (South Korea)

25 February 2012 AFC Championship qualifiers	Vietnam	1–2 (a.e.t.)	Indonesia	Bangkok, Thailand
17:00 UTC+7	Lưu Quỳnh Toàn 47'		Tamimy 44'; Silitonga 47'	Stadium: Krungthep Thonburi Indoor Stadium; Referee: Vadim Baratov (Turkmenistan)

26 February 2012 AFC Championship qualifiers	Australia	4–3	Vietnam	Bangkok, Thailand
14:00 UTC+7	Ngaluafe 21', 23'; Seeto 30'; Giovenali 35'		Nguyễn Trọng Thiện 36'; Lưu Quỳnh Toàn 37', 38'	Stadium: Krungthep Thonburi Indoor Stadium; Referee: Kim Jang-kwan (South Korea)

20 April 2012 AFF Championship GS	Philippines	1–6	Vietnam	Bangkok, Thailand
--:-- UTC+7	Bahadoran 16'		Lưu Quỳnh Toàn 5'; Bùi Văn Thắng 19'; Trần Hoàng Vinh 25', 27'; Nguyễn Bảo Quân 25'; Phạm Thanh Tuấn 39'	Stadium: Chanchai Acadium

21 April 2012 AFF Championship GS	Vietnam	3–0	Myanmar	Bangkok, Thailand
--:-- UTC+7	Lưu Quỳnh Toan 13'; Nguyễn Quốc Bảo (?); Trần Văn Vũ (?)			Stadium: Chanchai Acadium

22 April 2012 AFF Championship GS	Cambodia	1–4	Vietnam	Bangkok, Thailand
--:-- UTC+7	Yaneat (?)		Phạm Thành Đạt (?); Phùng Trọng Luân (?); Phạm Thanh Tuấn 33'; Nguyễn Trọng Thiện 34'	Stadium: Chanchai Acadium

23 April 2012 AFF Championship GS	Malaysia	2–7	Vietnam	Bangkok, Thailand
--:-- UTC+7	Fawzul (?); Akmar (?)		Nguyễn Hoàng Giang (?), 37'; Phạm Thành Đạt (?), 16'; Nguyễn Bảo Quân (?); Lưu Quỳnh Toàn 35'; Nguyễn Trọng Thiện 38'	Stadium: Chanchai Acadium

25 April 2012 AFF Championship SF	Vietnam	5–3	Indonesia	Bangkok, Thailand
--:-- UTC+7	Nguyễn Trọng Thiện 13'; Bùi Văn Thắng 15'; Nguyễn Hoàng Giang 34'; Nguyễn Quốc Bảo 37', 39'		Karami 15'; Syahidansyah 31'; Bambang (?)	Stadium: Chanchai Acadium

27 April 2012 AFF Championship F	Vietnam	4–9	Thailand	Bangkok, Thailand
17:00 UTC+7	Lưu Quỳnh Toàn 19' (pen.); Trần Văn Vũ 29'; Nguyễn Trọng Thiện 36'; Trần Hoàng Vinh 37'		Suphawut 2', 5', 20' (pen.); Apiwat 25'; Jetsada 28'; Kritsada 31', 31' (?) (?)	Stadium: Chanchai Acadium; Referee: Heldy Idang (Malaysia)

23 October 2012 Friendly	Vietnam	6–5	Uzbekistan	Ho Chi Minh City, Vietnam
--:-- UTC+7		Report		Stadium: Thái Sơn Nam Stadium

25 October 2012 Four Nations Tournament	Vietnam	0–9	Italy	Ho Chi Minh City, Vietnam
--:-- UTC+7		Report		Stadium: Tân Bình Stadium

27 October 2012 Four Nations Tournament	Vietnam	4–2	Kuwait	Ho Chi Minh City, Vietnam
--:-- UTC+7		Report		Stadium: Thái Sơn Nam Stadium

== 2013 ==
9 June 2013 Hybrid friendly	Reggina (Italy)	1–5	Vietnam	Florence, Italy
--:-- UTC+2		Report

16 June 2013 Friendly	Italy B	1–1	Vietnam	Gabicce Mare, Italy
--:-- UTC+2		Report

17 June 2013 Friendly	Italy B	5–4	Vietnam	Gabicce Mare, Italy
--:-- UTC+2		Report

28 June 2013 AIMAG GS	Vietnam	4–1	Palestine	Incheon, South Korea
18:30 UTC+9	Trần Văn Vũ 9', 16'; Lưu Quỳnh Toàn 16'; Ngô Anh Dũng 30'		Al-Sbakhi 19'	Stadium: Dongbu Students Gymnasium; Referee: Kim Jong-hee (South Korea)

30 June 2013 AIMAG GS	Lebanon	0–0	Vietnam	Incheon, South Korea
16:00 UTC+9				Stadium: Dongbu Students Gymnasium; Referee: Yasukazu Nobumoto (Japan)

27 September 2013 Friendly	Vietnam	6–3	China	Ho Chi Minh City, Vietnam
--:-- UTC+7		Report		Stadium: Thái Sơn Nam Stadium

29 September 2013 Friendly	Vietnam	1–3	China	Ho Chi Minh City, Vietnam
--:-- UTC+7		Report		Stadium: Thái Sơn Nam Stadium

1 October 2013 Friendly	Vietnam	7–5	South Korea	Ho Chi Minh City, Vietnam
--:-- UTC+7		Report		Stadium: Thái Sơn Nam Stadium

19 October 2013 AFF Championship GS	Vietnam	2–1	Malaysia	Bangkok, Thailand
16:00 UTC+7	Phạm Thanh Đạt 8'; Vũ Xuân Du 15'		Phạm Thanh Tuấn 9' (o.g.)	Stadium: Chanchai Acadium

21 October 2013 AFF Championship GS	Vietnam	10–1	Philippines	Bangkok, Thailand
19:00 UTC+7	Nguyễn Bảo Quân 4', 9'; Trần Hoàng Vinh 6'; Trần Văn Vũ 12', 33'; Phạm Thanh Tuấn 16'; Lưu Quỳnh Toàn 16', 34'; Hoàng Tuấn Vũ 14', 37'			Stadium: Chanchai Acadium

22 October 2013 AFF Championship GS	Brunei	2–4	Vietnam	Bangkok, Thailand
16:00 UTC+7	Muhammad Naqib 3'; Fakhri Bangkul 4'		Nguyễn Bảo Quân 10'; Nguyễn Hoàng Thiên 15'; Trần Hoàng Vinh 18'; Phùng Trọng Luân 19'	Stadium: Chanchai Acadium

23 October 2013 AFF Championship GS	Thailand	6–2	Vietnam	Bangkok, Thailand
19:00 UTC+7	Kritsada 9', 24', 28'; Jirawat 11', 28'; Chaiwat 40'		Nguyễn Bảo Quân 14'; Trần Văn Vũ 17'	Stadium: Chanchai Acadium

25 October 2013 AFF Championship SF	Australia	6–1	Vietnam	Bangkok, Thailand
16:30 UTC+7	Fogarty 3', 35', 36' de Moraes 9'; Cooper 16'; Giovenali 19'		Trần Hoàng Vinh 27'	Stadium: Chanchai Acadium

27 October 2013 AFF Championship 3rd place	Indonesia	3–7	Vietnam	Bangkok, Thailand
12:00 UTC+7	Ardy 16', 20'; Saptaji 38'		Vũ Xuân Du 2', 12'; Lý Khánh Hưng 10', 30'; Phùng Trọng Luân 35'; Trần Văn Vũ 37'; Phạm Thành Đạt 39'	Stadium: Chanchai Acadium

20 November 2013 Ho Chi Minh City Tournament	Vietnam	1–2	Japan	Ho Chi Minh City, Vietnam
--:-- UTC+7		Report		Stadium: Phu Tho Gymnasium

21 November 2013 Ho Chi Minh City Tournament	Thailand	3–1	Vietnam	Ho Chi Minh City, Vietnam
--:-- UTC+7		Report		Stadium: Phu Tho Gymnasium

22 November 2013 Ho Chi Minh City Tournament	Vietnam	3–2	Brazil	Ho Chi Minh City, Vietnam
--:-- UTC+7		Report		Stadium: Phu Tho Gymnasium

13 December 2013 SEA Games GS	Laos	1–10	Vietnam	Naypyidaw, Myanmar
15:30 UTC+6		Report		Stadium: Wunna Theikdi Stadium

15 December 2013 SEA Games GS	Vietnam	0–4	Thailand	Naypyidaw, Myanmar
15:30 UTC+6		Report		Stadium: Wunna Theikdi Stadium

17 December 2013 SEA Games SF	Indonesia	1–3	Vietnam	Naypyidaw, Myanmar
14:00 UTC+6		Report		Stadium: Wunna Theikdi Stadium

20 December 2013 SEA Games F	Vietnam	1–8	Thailand	Naypyidaw, Myanmar
16:00 UTC+6		Report		Stadium: Wunna Theikdi Stadium

== 2014 ==
11 April 2014 Narón Futsal Tournament SF	O Esteo (Spain)	2–3	Vietnam	Narón, Spain
--:-- UTC+2		Report

12 April 2014 Narón Futsal Tournament F	Cidade de Narón (Spain)	3–4	Vietnam	Narón, Spain
--:-- UTC+2		Report

14 April 2014 Hybrid friendly	Santiago (Spain)	7–3	Vietnam	Santiago de Compostela, Spain
--:-- UTC+2		Report

15 April 2014 Hybrid friendly	Burela (Spain)	1–2	Vietnam	Burela, Spain
--:-- UTC+2		Report

17 April 2014 Hybrid friendly	O Parrulo (Spain)	3–4	Vietnam	Narón, Spain
--:-- UTC+2		Report

20 April 2014 Hybrid friendly	Cidade de Narón (Spain)	5–4	Vietnam	Narón, Spain
--:-- UTC+2		Report

26 April 2014 Friendly	Vietnam	6–2	Lebanon	Ho Chi Minh City, Vietnam
--:-- UTC+7		Report		Stadium: Phú Thọ Gymnasium

30 April 2014 AFC Championship GS	Vietnam	1–2	Iraq	Ho Chi Minh City, Vietnam
19:00 UTC+7	Al-Zubaidi 25' (o.g.)	Report	Abed 22'; Fahem 40'	Stadium: Phú Thọ Gymnasium

2 May 2014 AFC Championship GS	Tajikistan	4–10	Vietnam	Ho Chi Minh City, Vietnam
18:30 UTC+7	Makhmudov 11', 28'; Mamedbabaev 17'; Jumaev 17'	Report	Trần Văn Vũ 10'; Phùng Trọng Luân 12', 27'; Ngô Ngọc Sơn 13', 27'; Lê Quốc Nam 15'; Phạm Đức Hòa 16'; Nguyễn Bảo Quân 25', 33'; Lý Khánh Hưng 37'	Stadium: Phú Thọ Gymnasium

4 May 2014 AFC Championship GS	Vietnam	2–1	Kuwait	Ho Chi Minh City, Vietnam
18:30 UTC+7	Ahmad 18' (o.g.); Phùng Trọng Luân 24'	Report	Almosabehi 40'	Stadium: Phú Thọ Gymnasium

7 May 2014 AFC Championship QF	Iran	15–4	Vietnam	Ho Chi Minh City, Vietnam
18:30 UTC+7	Tayyebi 2', 10', 24'; Fakhim 11', 36', 38'; Esmaeilpour 12'; Vafaei 17', 36'; Hassanzadeh 25', 26', 28'; Shajari 29', 32'; Jafari 30'	Report	Phùng Trọng Luân 12', 29'; Lý Khánh Hưng 22'; Pham Thành Đạt 33'	Stadium: Phú Thọ Gymnasium

22 July 2014 Hangzhou Tournament	Iran	8–3	Vietnam	Hangzhou, China
--:-- UTC+8		Report

23 July 2014 Hangzhou Tournament	Vietnam	4–0	Myanmar	Hangzhou, China
--:-- UTC+8		Report

24 July 2014 Hangzhou Tournament	China	7–3	Vietnam	Hangzhou, China
--:-- UTC+8		Report

3 September 2014 Hybrid friendly	Thailand Universiade	3–5	Vietnam	Pathum Thani, Thailand
--:-- UTC+7		Report		Referee: North Bangkok University Arena

4 September 2014 Friendly	Vietnam	5–2	Malaysia	Pathum Thani, Thailand
--:-- UTC+7		Report

7 September 2014 Hybrid friendly	Thailand Universiade	3–6	Vietnam	Chonburi, Thailand
--:-- UTC+7

9 September 2014 Hybrid friendly	Chonburi Bluewave (Thailand)	6–0	Vietnam	Chonburi, Thailand
--:-- UTC+7		Report		Stadium: Bluewave Arena

19 September 2014 AFF Championship GS	Myanmar	1–6	Vietnam	Shah Alam, Malaysia
11:30 UTC+6	Pyae Phyo Maung 21'	Report	Ngô Ngọc Sơn 11'; Lê Quốc Nam 12'; Trần Long Vũ 14'; Lê Quốc Nam 16'; Trần Thái Huy 17'; Lý Khánh Hưng 34'	Stadium: Stadium Melawati; Referee: Helday Idang (Malaysia)

21 September 2014 AFF Championship GS	Vietnam	11–1	Philippines	Shah Alam, Malaysia
12:00 UTC+6	Phùng Trọng Luân 10', 22'; Lê Quốc Nam 14', 33'; Phạm Thành Đạt 25'; Trần Long Vũ 26'; Phạm Đức Hòa 27', 28', 36', 39'; Cañedo 34' (o.g.)	Report	Cutamora 35'	Stadium: Stadium Melawati; Referee: Noviandry (Indonesia)

22 September 2014 AFF Championship GS	Laos	0–18	Vietnam	Shah Alam, Malaysia
12:00 UTC+6				Stadium: Stadium Melawati

23 September 2014 AFF Championship GS	Vietnam	2–0	Thailand	Shah Alam, Malaysia
14:30 UTC+6	Lê Quốc Nam 31'; Phùng Trọng Luân 35'	Report		Stadium: Stadium Melawati; Referee: Zulkifli Ahmad (Malaysia)

25 September 2014 AFF Championship SF	Vietnam	3–4 (a.e.t.)	Australia	Shah Alam, Malaysia
17:00 UTC+6	Phùng Trọng Luân 7', 36'; Nguyễn Bảo Quân 39'	Report	Basger 19'; Fogarty 22', 48'; G. Giovenali 36'	Stadium: Stadium Melawati; Referee: Zulkifli Ahmad (Malaysia)

27 September 2014 AFF Championship 3rd place	Indonesia	2–2 (a.e.t.) (1–3 p)	Vietnam	Shah Alam, Malaysia
14:00 UTC+6	Ladjanibi (?); Octavianus (?)	Report	Lê Quốc Nam (?); Trần Long Vũ (?)	Stadium: Stadium Melawati; Referee: Zulkifli Ahmad (Malaysia)
	Penalties
	Ladjanibi (penalty missed); Kustiawan (penalty scored)		(penalty scored) Trần Văn Vũ; (penalty scored) Nguyễn Bảo Quân; (penalty scored) Phạm Đức Hòa

11 November 2014 Friendly	Iran	6–1	Vietnam	São Paulo, Brazil
--:--

12 November 2014 Grand Prix de Futsal GS	Brazil	8–1	Vietnam	São Bernardo do Campo, Brazil
18:45				Stadium: Ginásio Poliesportivo Adib Moysés Dib

14 November 2014 Grand Prix de Futsal GS	Colombia	6–2	Vietnam	São Bernardo do Campo, Brazil
16:00				Stadium: Ginásio Poliesportivo Adib Moysés Dib

15 November 2014 Grand Prix de Futsal 5th place	Vietnam	1–3	Costa Rica	São Bernardo do Campo, Brazil
14:00				Stadium: Ginásio Poliesportivo Adib Moysés Dib

== 2015 ==
9 February 2015 Friendly	Croatia	6–3	Vietnam	Novigrad, Croatia
17:00 UTC+2		Report

11 February 2015 Friendly	Slovenia	4–6	Vietnam	Novigrad, Croatia
15:00 UTC+2		Report

12 February 2015 Friendly	Croatia	8–3	Vietnam	Novigrad, Croatia
17:00 UTC+2		Report

9 June 2015 Friendly	Japan	2–1	Vietnam	Chiba, Japan
--:-- UTC+9		Report

10 June 2015 Friendly	Japan	7–2	Vietnam	Chiba, Japan
--:-- UTC+9		Report

12 June 2015 Hybrid friendly	Shonan Bellmare (Japan)	2–3	Vietnam	Chiba, Japan
--:-- UTC+9		Report

21 September 2015 Hybrid friendly	Santiago (Spain)	4–2	Vietnam	Santiago de Compostela, Spain
--:-- UTC+2		Report

22 September 2015 Hybrid friendly	Cidade de Narón (Spain)	2–1	Vietnam	Narón, Spain
--:-- UTC+2		Report

23 September 2015 Hybrid friendly	Burela (Spain)	2–3	Vietnam	Burela, Spain
--:-- UTC+2		Report

26 September 2015 Hybrid friendly	Vilalba (Spain)	2–7	Vietnam	Vilalba, Spain
--:-- UTC+2		Report

28 September 2015 Hybrid friendly	Lugo (Spain)	4–5	Vietnam	Lugo, Spain
--:-- UTC+2		Report

8 October 2015 AFF Championship GS	Laos	1–13	Vietnam	Bangkok, Thailand
11:30 UTC+7	Oley 7'	Report	Lê Quốc Nam 3'; Mai Thành Đạt 8', 32'; Trần Long Vũ 9', 38'; Phùng Trọng Luân 9', 35'; Nguyễn Minh Trí 11'; Nguyễn Bảo Quân 11'; Ngô Ngọc Sơn 14'; Danh Phát 19'; Trần Văn Vũ 23'; Dương Anh Tùng 38'	Stadium: Bangkok Arena; Attendance: 200; Referee: Liu Jianqiao (China)

10 October 2015 AFF Championship GS	Vietnam	2–1	Myanmar	Bangkok, Thailand
14:00 UTC+7	Trần Văn Vũ 9', 28'	Report	Pyae Phyo Maung 24'	Stadium: Bangkok Arena; Attendance: 300; Referee: Zhang Youze (China)

11 October 2015 AFF Championship GS	Philippines	1–19	Vietnam	Bangkok, Thailand
11:30 UTC+7	Hermosa 25'	Report	Phạm Đức Hòa 7', 17', 25'; Dương Anh Tùng 11'; Lê Quốc Nam 21', 27'; Nguyễn Minh Trí 21', 31'; Nguyễn Bảo Quân 21', 31', 32'; Yuhico 23' (o.g.); Ngô Ngọc Sơn 27'; Vũ Xuân Du 28', 30'; Trần Văn Vũ 34'; Trần Long Vũ 36'; Phùng Trọng Luân 36'; Danh Phát 40'	Stadium: Bangkok Arena; Attendance: 100; Referee: Liu Jianqiao (China)

12 October 2015 AFF Championship GS	Vietnam	5–6	Australia	Bangkok, Thailand
14:00 UTC+7	Lê Quốc Nam 14'; Nguyễn Minh Trí 17'; Trần Văn Vũ 22'; Ngô Ngọc Sơn 27'; Dương Anh Tùng 28'	Report	Fogarty 13', 15', 18', 23'; Basger 16'; Lockhart 27'	Stadium: Bangkok Arena; Attendance: 300; Referee: Hasan Mohammed Al-Gburi (Iraq)

14 October 2015 AFF Championship SF	Thailand	6–0	Vietnam	Bangkok, Thailand
16:00 UTC+7	Jirawat 29'; Nattawut 30'; Suphawut 32', 38', 39'; Jetsada 39'	Report		Stadium: Bangkok Arena; Attendance: 10,000; Referee: Tomohiro Kozaki (Japan)

16 October 2015 AFF Championship 3rd place	Vietnam	5–6	Malaysia	Bangkok, Thailand
16:00 UTC+7	Dương Anh Tùng 4'; Vũ Xuân Du 11'; Trần Văn Vũ 13'; Lê Quốc Nam 21'; Ngô Ngọc Sơn 30'	Report	Khairul 12'; Fitri 14'; Nizam 18', 32', 39'; Fawzul 34'	Stadium: Bangkok Arena; Attendance: 10,000; Referee: Liu Jianqiao (China)

== 2016 ==
25 January 2016 Friendly	Vietnam	5–4	Malaysia	Ho Chi Minh City, Vietnam
--:-- UTC+7				Stadium: Thái Sơn Nam Stadium

26 January 2016 Friendly	Vietnam	3–2	Malaysia	Ho Chi Minh City, Vietnam
--:-- UTC+7				Stadium: Thái Sơn Nam Stadium

1 February 2016 Friendly	Uzbekistan	3–3	Vietnam	Tashkent, Uzbekistan
--:-- UTC+5

6 February 2016 Friendly	Vietnam	4–1	China	Tashkent, Uzbekistan
--:-- UTC+5

11 February 2016 AFC Championship GS	Vietnam	5–4	Chinese Taipei	Tashkent, Uzbekistan
19:00 UTC+5	Nguyễn Bảo Quân 4' (pen.); Phùng Trọng Luân 6'; Lê Quốc Nam 28'; Trần Long Vũ 31'; Ngô Ngọc Sơn 37'	Report	Lin Chih-hung 4', 31'; Chi Sheng-fa 26'; Huang Po-chun 39'	Stadium: Universal Stadium; Attendance: 100; Referee: Husein Mahmoud Khalaileh (Jordan)

13 February 2016 AFC Championship GS	Tajikistan	1–8	Vietnam	Tashkent, Uzbekistan
19:00 UTC+5	Sardorov 9'	Report	Dương Anh Tùng 1', 22'; Trần Văn Vũ 14', 37'; Nguyễn Bảo Quân 20'; Lê Quốc Nam 27'; Trần Long Vũ 34'; Phùng Trọng Luân 35'	Stadium: Universal Stadium; Attendance: 300; Referee: Khamis Hassan Al Shamsi (United Arab Emirates)

15 February 2016 AFC Championship GS	Thailand	3–1	Vietnam	Tashkent, Uzbekistan
19:00 UTC+5	Suphawut 32', 40', 40'	Report	Vũ Xuân Du 38'	Stadium: Universal Stadium; Attendance: 700; Referee: Hasan Mousa Al-Gburi (Iraq)

17 February 2016 AFC Championship QF	Japan	4–4 (a.e.t.) (1–2 p)	Vietnam	Tashkent, Uzbekistan
19:00 UTC+5	Nibuya 8', 26'; Morioka 13', 42'	Report	Trần Văn Vũ 14', 39'; Danh Phát 35'; Trần Thái Huy 49'	Stadium: Uzbekistan Stadium; Attendance: 150; Referee: Nurdin Bukuev (Kyrgyzstan)
	Penalties
	Morioka (penalty missed); Henmi (penalty scored); Nibuya (penalty missed)		(penalty scored) Nguyễn Bảo Quân; (penalty missed) Dương Anh Tùng; (penalty scored) Phùng Trọng Luân

19 February 2016 AFC Championship SF	Iran	13–1	Vietnam	Tashkent, Uzbekistan
19:00 UTC+5	Javid 2', 20', 32'; Tavakoli 8', 8', 20', 22'; Ahmadi 13'; Tayyebi 16', 27'; Vafaei 26'; Keshavarz 37', 39'	Report	Phùng Trọng Luân 17'	Stadium: Uzbekistan Stadium; Attendance: 2,000; Referee: Nurdin Bukuev (Kyrgyzstan)

21 February 2016 AFC Championship 3rd place	Thailand	8–0	Vietnam	Tashkent, Uzbekistan
16:00 UTC+5	Jetsada 6'; Apiwat 11', 12'; Suphawut 18' (pen.), 18' (pen.), 36', 40'; Jirawat 34'	Report		Stadium: Uzbekistan Stadium; Attendance: 2,000; Referee: An Ran (China)

22 April 2016 Friendly	Japan	7–0	Vietnam	Nagoya, Japan
19:00 UTC+9				Stadium: Takeda Teva Ocean Arena

23 April 2016 Friendly	Vietnam	2–2	Uzbekistan	Nagoya, Japan
16:00 UTC+9				Stadium: Takeda Teva Ocean Arena

10 August 2016 Friendly	Vietnam	3–3	Egypt	Ho Chi Minh City, Vietnam
17:00 UTC+7		Report		Stadium: Tôn Đức Thắng University Stadium

12 August 2016 Friendly	Vietnam	1–4	Egypt	Ho Chi Minh City, Vietnam
17:00 UTC+7		Report		Stadium: Tôn Đức Thắng University Stadium

19 August 2016 Friendly	Spain	4–1	Vietnam	Talavera de la Reina, Spain
20:30 UTC+5		Report		Stadium: Pabellón 1º de Mayo

23 August 2016 Hybrid friendly	UMA Antequera (Spain)	2–2 (0–2 p)	Vietnam	Málaga, Spain
19:00 UTC+5				Stadium: Pabellón Polideportivo Municipal Fernando Argüelles

26 August 2016 Hybrid friendly	Jaén (Spain)	4–1	Vietnam	Jaén, Spain
21:00 UTC+5		Report

31 August 2016 Friendly	Argentina	3–1	Vietnam	Rosario, Argentina
21:30 UTC−3

3 September 2016 Friendly	Argentina	5–2	Vietnam	Rosario, Argentina
17:30 UTC−3

11 September 2016 World Cup GS	Vietnam	4–2	Guatemala	Cali, Colombia
18:00 UTC−5	Nguyễn Minh Trí 20', 29', 29'; Trần Văn Vũ 40' (pen.)	Report	Wanderley 24'; Patrick 31'	Stadium: Coliseo El Pueblo; Attendance: 1,615; Referee: Bogdan Sorescu (Romania)

14 September 2016 World Cup GS	Paraguay	7–1	Vietnam	Cali, Colombia
20:00 UTC−5	F. Martínez 3'; J. Salas 11'; E. Ayala 12'; Trần Long Vũ 13' (o.g.); Villalba 18'; Rejala 34'; Pedrozo 39'	Report	Trần Văn Vũ 40'	Stadium: Coliseo El Pueblo; Attendance: 2,193; Referee: Saša Tomić (Croatia)

17 September 2016 World Cup GS	Italy	2–0	Vietnam	Bucaramanga, Colombia
18:00 UTC−5	Lima 5'; Murilo 27'	Report		Stadium: Coliseo Bicentenario; Attendance: 1,374; Referee: José Francisco Katemo Katchingavisa (Angola)

20 September 2016 World Cup R16	Russia	7–0	Vietnam	Medellín, Colombia
17:30 UTC−5	Chishkala 3'; Abramovich 10', 13'; Abramov 18'; Niyazov 22'; Rômulo 30'; Milovanov 37'	Report		Stadium: Coliseo Iván de Bedout; Attendance: 643; Referee: Jorge Flores (El Salvador)

19 October 2016 Hybrid friendly	Vietnam	3–2	(Vietnam) Hải Phương Nam	Ho Chi Minh City, Vietnam
--:-- UTC+7				Stadium: Thái Sơn Nam Stadium

22 October 2016 Hybrid friendly	Vietnam	Cancelled	(Vietnam) Tân Hiệp Hưng	Ho Chi Minh City, Vietnam
--:-- UTC+7				Stadium: Thái Sơn Nam Stadium

31 October 2016 AFF Championship GS	Vietnam	Cancelled (Note: ASEAN Football Federation (AFF) officially announced that the 2016 AFF Futsal Championship will be canceled due to the withdrawing of all hosts. Thailand was supposed to be the host of 2016 AFF Championship as the first place. However, Thailand decided to withdraw from hosting role due to the passing of HM King Bhumibol. Indonesia submitted the request to be the new host and AFF rescheduled the event to Jakarta in 9–15 November 2016. However, Indonesia decided to withdraw from being host nation. Singapore is another candidate but they are also unable to host the event in the short time of preparation. With all of the causes, AFF then decided to cancel the 2016 Futsal Championship. It was later rescheduled to January 2017, but Vietnam decided to withdraw due to internal reasons)	Brunei	Bangkok, Thailand
--:-- UTC+7				Stadium: Indoor Stadium Huamark

1 November 2016 AFF Championship GS	Vietnam	Cancelled	Timor-Leste	Bangkok, Thailand
--:-- UTC+7				Stadium: Indoor Stadium Huamark

2 November 2016 AFF Championship GS	Thailand	Cancelled	Vietnam	Bangkok, Thailand
--:-- UTC+7				Stadium: Indoor Stadium Huamark

23 November 2016 Hybrid friendly	Vietnam	6–2	(Vietnam) Tân Hiệp Hưng	Ho Chi Minh City, Vietnam
--:-- UTC+7				Stadium: Thái Sơn Nam Stadium

26 November 2016 Hybrid friendly	Vietnam	9–2	(Vietnam) Hải Phương Nam	Ho Chi Minh City, Vietnam
--:-- UTC+7				Stadium: Thái Sơn Nam Stadium

2 December 2016 CFA Cup	Ukraine	3–1	Vietnam	Changshu, China
--:-- UTC+8

3 December 2016 CFA Cup	Vietnam	4–3	Mexico	Changshu, China
--:-- UTC+8

4 December 2016 CFA Cup	China	2–2	Vietnam	Changshu, China
--:-- UTC+8

== 2017 ==
12 July 2017 Hybrid friendly	Chonburi Bluewave (Thailand)	6–2	Vietnam	Bangkok, Thailand
--:-- UTC+7		Report

14 July 2017 Hybrid friendly	Thai Port (Thailand)	1–2	Vietnam	Bangkok, Thailand
--:-- UTC+7		Report		Stadium: Kodang Futsal Stadium

16 July 2017 Hybrid friendly	Bangkok BTS (Thailand)	1–3	Vietnam	Bangkok, Thailand
--:-- UTC+7		Report		Stadium: His Majesty the King's 72nd Birthday Anniversary Gymnasium

18 August 2017 SEA Games	Thailand	4–1	Vietnam	Shah Alam, Malaysia
15:00 UTC+8	Suphawut 9'; Muhammad 18', 24'; Jirawat 39'		Nguyễn Minh Trí 28'	Stadium: Panasonic Stadium

20 August 2017 SEA Games	Malaysia	1–1	Vietnam	Shah Alam, Malaysia
20:00 UTC+8	Bakri 29'		Phạm Đức Hòa 37'	Stadium: Panasonic Stadium

22 August 2017 SEA Games	Vietnam	6–1	Myanmar	Shah Alam, Malaysia
14:00 UTC+8	Trần Văn Vũ 2'; Trần Thái Huy 17'; Ngô Ngọc Sơn 24', 32'; Nguyễn Thành Tín 25'; Nguyễn Văn Huy 33'		Pyae Phyo Maung (2) 39'	Stadium: Panasonic Stadium

25 August 2017 SEA Games	Vietnam	4–1	Indonesia	Shah Alam, Malaysia
15:00 UTC+8	Phạm Đức Hòa 27'; Lê Quốc Nam 33'; Vũ Xuân Du 38'; Ngô Ngọc Sơn 40'		14'	Stadium: Panasonic Stadium

16 September 2017 AIMAG GS	Chinese Taipei	2–1	Vietnam	Ashgabat, Turkmenistan
16:45 UTC+5	Lê Quốc Nam 17' (o.g.); Lai Ming-hui 28'	Report	Ngô Ngọc Sơn 11'	Stadium: Ice Arena; Referee: Mahmoud Reza Nassirloo (Iran)

19 September 2017 AIMAG GS	Vietnam	8–0	Hong Kong	Ashgabat, Turkmenistan
16:45 UTC+5	Lê Quốc Nam 7'; Nguyễn Minh Trí 8'; Vũ Đức Tùng 12'; Ngô Ngọc Sơn 16'; Phùng Trọng Luân 25'; Trần Thái Huy 32', 34'; Nguyễn Mạnh Dũng 37'	Report		Stadium: Ice Arena; Referee: Mohamad Chami (Lebanon)

20 September 2017 AIMAG GS	Vietnam	2–1	Solomon Islands	Ashgabat, Turkmenistan
16:45 UTC+5	Phạm Đức Hòa 4'; Phùng Trọng Luân 27'	Report	Stevenson 40'	Stadium: Ice Arena; Referee: Khalil Balhawan (Lebanon)

21 September 2017 AIMAG GS	Turkmenistan	0–1	Vietnam	Ashgabat, Turkmenistan
16:45 UTC+5		Report	Ngô Ngọc Sơn 14'	Stadium: Ice Arena; Referee: Hawkar Salar (Iraq)

23 September 2017 AIMAG QF	Vietnam	0–2	Uzbekistan	Ashgabat, Turkmenistan
19:00 UTC+5		Report	Choriev 6'; Abdumavlyanov 36'	Stadium: Ice Arena; Referee: An Ran (China)

20 October 2017 CFA Cup	Croatia	3–1	Vietnam	Changshu, China
--:-- UTC+8		Report	Trần Văn Vũ 36'

21 October 2017 CFA Cup	Vietnam	4–3	China	Changshu, China
--:-- UTC+8	Nguyến Minh Trí 13'; Cổ Trí Kiệt 17'; Vũ Quốc Hưng 24'; Lê Quốc Nam 31'	Report	Zhang Liang 13' (pen.); Liu Wenxi 15'; Xu Yang 27'

22 October 2017 CFA Cup	Vietnam	2–2	Netherlands	Changshu, China
--:-- UTC+8	Lê Quốc Nam 26'; Phạm Đức Hòa 36'	Report	Bouszambou 15'; Bouyouzan 31'

27 October 2017 AFF Championship GS	Philippines	0–24	Vietnam	Ho Chi Minh City, Vietnam
19:30 UTC+7		Report	Vũ Quốc Hưng 2', 3', 27', 37'; Nguyễn Minh Trí 4', 21'; Phùng Trọng Luân 6', 28', 38'; Trần Thái Huy 10', 20', 33', 34'; Phạm Đức Hòa 11', 36', 36'; Cổ Trí Kiệt 12'; Khổng Đình Hùng 16'; Ngô Ngọc Sơn 18', 28'; Lê Quốc Nam 24', 26'; Đinh Văn Toàn 27'; Trần Văn Vũ 40'	Stadium: Phú Thọ Indoor Stadium; Attendance: 3,500; Referee: Husain Ali Al-Bahhar (Bahrain)

28 October 2017 AFF Championship GS	Vietnam	4–3	Indonesia	Ho Chi Minh City, Vietnam
19:30 UTC+7	Phùng Trọng Luân 7', 32', 36'; Nguyễn Minh Trí 40'	Report	Nawawi 12', 35' (pen.); Ardiansyah 34'	Stadium: Phú Thọ Indoor Stadium; Attendance: 3,500; Referee: Osama Saeed Idrees (Bahrain)

29 October 2017 AFF Championship GS	Brunei	0–18	Vietnam	Ho Chi Minh City, Vietnam
19:00 UTC+7		Report	Ngô Ngọc Sơn 1', 10', 23', 30'; Vũ Quốc Hưng 3'; Đinh Văn Toàn 5'; Trần Thái Huy 5', 24', 26', 33'; Phùng Trọng Luân 9', 34', 39'; Lê Quốc Nam 12'; Vũ Xuân Du 23'; Danh Phát 25', 27', 39'	Stadium: Phú Thọ Indoor Stadium; Attendance: 3,500; Referee: Mohamad Chami (Lebanon)

30 October 2017 AFF Championship GS	Vietnam	3–0	Myanmar	Ho Chi Minh City, Vietnam
19:00 UTC+7	Phùng Trọng Luân 13'; Lê Quốc Nam 40'; Nguyễn Văn Huy 40'	Report		Stadium: Phú Thọ Indoor Stadium; Attendance: 3,500; Referee: Husain Ali Al-Bahhar (Bahrain)

1 November 2017 AFF Championship SF	Vietnam	1–5	Malaysia	Ho Chi Minh City, Vietnam
19:00 UTC+7	Ngô Ngọc Sơn 36'	Report (AFC); Report (AFF)	Khairul 10', 12'; Idris 15', 35'; Nawi 14'	Stadium: Phú Thọ Indoor Stadium; Attendance: 3,500; Referee: Mahmoudreza Nasirloo (Iran)

3 November 2017 AFF Championship 3rd place	Vietnam	2–2 (3–4 p)	Myanmar	Ho Chi Minh City, Vietnam
16:00 UTC+7	Phùng Trọng Luân 10'; Danh Phát 26'	Report (AFC)	Kyaw Soe Moe 33'; Nyein Min Soe 36'	Stadium: Phú Thọ Indoor Stadium; Attendance: 1,500; Referee: Vahid Arzpeyma Mohamareh (Iran)
	Penalties
	Phạm Đức Hòa (penalty scored); Vũ Xuân Du (penalty scored); Nguyễn Minh Trí (penalty missed); Phùng Trọng Luân (penalty scored); Danh Phát (penalty missed)		Pyae Phyo Maung (3) (penalty scored); Pyae Phyo Maung (2) (penalty missed); Kyaw Soe Moe (penalty scored); Naing Ye Kyaw (penalty scored); Aung Aung (penalty scored)

== 2018 ==
26 January 2018 Hybrid friendly	Bardral Urayasu (Japan)	1–4	Vietnam	Urayasu, Japan
				Attendance: Urayasu General Gymnasium

29 January 2018 Hybrid friendly	Fugador Sumida (Japan)	4–1	Vietnam	Tokyo, Japan
				Stadium: Sumida City Gymnasium

1 February 2018 AFC Championship GS	Vietnam	1–2	Malaysia	New Taipei City, Taiwan
16:30 UTC+8	Vũ Đức Tùng 19'	Report	Nawi 36', 40'	Stadium: Xinzhuang Gymnasium; Attendance: 182; Referee: Azat Hajypolatov (Turkmenistan)

3 February 2018 AFC Championship GS	Bahrain	1–2	Vietnam	New Taipei City, Taiwan
16:30 UTC+8	Al-Sandi 28'	Report	Nguyễn Đắc Huy 18'; Phùng Trọng Luân 18'	Stadium: Xinzhuang Gymnasium; Attendance: 538; Referee: Tomohiro Kozaki (Japan)

5 February 2018 AFC Championship GS	Chinese Taipei	1–3	Vietnam	New Taipei City, Taiwan
19:00 UTC+8	Huang Po-chun 19'	Report	Vũ Đức Tùng 29'; Phạm Đức Hòa 30'; Nguyễn Đắc Huy 39'	Stadium: Xinzhuang Gymnasium; Attendance: 2,200; Referee: Mohamad Chami (Lebanon)

8 February 2018 AFC Championship QF	Vietnam	1–3	Uzbekistan	New Taipei City, Taiwan
19:00 UTC+8	Vũ Đức Tùng 19'	Report	Adilov 8'; Choriev 28'; Hamroev 39'	Stadium: Xinzhuang Gymnasium; Attendance: 350; Referee: Mohamad Chami (Lebanon)

22 June 2018 CFA Cup	Russia	6–2	Vietnam	Changsha, China
--:-- UTC+8		Report

23 June 2018 CFA Cup	Vietnam	4–0	China	Changsha, China
--:-- UTC+8	Tôn Thất Phi 8'; Phạm Đức Hòa 10'; Nguyến Đắc Huy 22'; Trần Quang Toàn 28'	Report

24 June 2018 CFA Cup	Vietnam	7–0	New Zealand	Changsha, China
--:-- UTC+8	Nguyễn Thành Tín; Trần Quang Toàn; Chu Văn Tiến; Dương Ngọc Linh; Nguyến Đắc Huy; Đặng Anh Tài	Report

22 October 2018 Hybrid friendly	Port (Thailand)	1–1	Vietnam	Bangkok, Thailand
	36'	Report	Vũ Quốc Hưng 40'	Stadium: Kodang Futsal Stadium

30 October 2018 Hybrid friendly	Department of Highways (Thailand)	2–2	Vietnam	Bangkok, Thailand
		Report	Phạm Đức Hòa 12', 30'	Stadium: Plaibang Municipality Gymnasium

5 November 2018 AFF Championship GS	Vietnam	9–0	Brunei	Yogyakarta, Indonesia
18:30 UTC+7	Chu Văn Tiến 6'; Vũ Quốc Hưng 13'; Tôn Thất Phi 14'; Nguyễn Thành Tín 14', 26', 34'; Nguyễn Mạnh Dũng 20'; Châu Đoàn Phát 28'; Trần Văn Vũ 35'	Report		Stadium: GOR UNY; Referee: Wahyu Wicaksana (Indonesia)

6 November 2018 AFF Championship GS	Timor-Leste	1–8	Vietnam	Yogyakarta, Indonesia
18:30 UTC+7	Escurial 4'	Report	Vũ Quốc Hưng 3'; Tôn Thất Phi 5'; Nguyễn Mạnh Dũng 8'; Nguyễn Thành Tín 12'; Chu Văn Tiến 13', 21'; Đặng Anh Tài 29', 39'	Stadium: GOR UNY; Referee: Zin Myo Aung (Myanmar)

7 November 2018 AFF Championship GS	Thailand	4–1	Vietnam	Yogyakarta, Indonesia
16:30 UTC+7	Jetsada 19', 34'; Ronnachai 22'; Kiatiyot 23'	Report	Trần Văn Vũ 14'	Stadium: GOR UNY; Referee: Sukry Haji Matassim (Brunei)

9 November 2018 AFF Championship SF	Malaysia	2–2 (5–4 p)	Vietnam	Yogyakarta, Indonesia
17:30 UTC+7	Ismail 5'; Rahman 26'	Report	Võ Quốc Hưng 30'; Nguyễn Thành Tín 40'	Stadium: GOR UNY; Referee: Pornnarong Grairod (Thailand)
	Penalties
	Nawi (penalty scored); Naim (penalty scored); Kamaruzuan (penalty scored); Aizas (penalty scored); Fadzil (penalty missed); Haniffa (penalty scored)		(penalty scored) Nguyễn Thành Tín; (penalty scored) Tôn Thất Phi; (penalty scored) Trần Văn Vũ; (penalty scored) Chu Văn Tiến; (penalty missed) Ngô Ngọc Sơn; (penalty missed) Vũ Đức Tùng

11 November 2018 AFF Championship 3rd place	Vietnam	1–3	Indonesia	Yogyakarta, Indonesia
11:00 UTC+7	Đặng Anh Tài 4'	Report	Kustiawan 17'; Faidasa 26'; Bayu 31'	Stadium: GOR UNY; Referee: Benjapol Muchareonsap (Thailand)

== 2019 ==
27 February 2019 Hybrid friendly	Real Betis (Spain)	2–2	Vietnam	Seville, Spain
		Report

3 March 2019 Hybrid friendly	UMA Antequera (Spain)	5–4	Vietnam	Málaga, Spain
		Report

6 March 2019 Hybrid friendly	Jaén (Spain)	6–0	Vietnam	Jaén, Spain

21 October 2019 AFF Championship GS	Vietnam	2–0	Australia	Ho Chi Minh City, Vietnam
19:00 UTC+7	Nguyễn Mạnh Dũng 28'; Nguyễn Minh Trí 37'	Report		Stadium: Phú Thọ Indoor Stadium; Attendance: 3,500; Referee: Takeshi Fujita (Japan)

22 October 2019 AFF Championship GS	Indonesia	0–0	Vietnam	Ho Chi Minh City, Vietnam
16:30 UTC+7		Report		Stadium: Phú Thọ Indoor Stadium; Attendance: 2,000; Referee: Ebrahim Mehrabiafshar (Iran)

23 October 2019 AFF Championship GS	Vietnam	4–2	Malaysia	Ho Chi Minh City, Vietnam
19:00 UTC+7	Nguyễn Thành Tín 6'; Vũ Đức Tùng 24'; Nguyễn Minh Trí 39'; Châu Đoàn Phát 40'	Report (AFC); Report (AFF)	Haniffa 33'; Azwann 37'	Stadium: Phú Thọ Indoor Stadium; Attendance: 1,800; Referee: Takeshi Fujita (Japan)

25 October 2019 AFF Championship SF	Thailand	2–0	Vietnam	Ho Chi Minh City, Vietnam
14:00 UTC+7	Ronnachai 26'; Kritsada 26'	Report (AFC); Report (AFF)		Stadium: Phú Thọ Indoor Stadium; Attendance: 1,692; Referee: Lee Po-fu (Chinese Taipei)

27 October 2019 AFF Championship 3rd place	Vietnam	7–3	Myanmar	Ho Chi Minh City, Vietnam
14:00 UTC+7	Trần Thái Huy 6', 6'; Nhan Gia Hưng 27'; Trần Văn Vũ 32', 38'; Phạm Đức Hòa 34'; Nguyễn Minh Trí 39'	Report (AFC); Report (AFF)	Naing Ye Kyaw 9', 33'; Kyaw Soe Moe 16'	Stadium: Phú Thọ Indoor Stadium; Attendance: 1,655; Referee: Hawkar Ahmed (Iraq)

11 December 2019 Thailand Five's	Vietnam	3–3	Guatemala	Nakhon Ratchasima, Thailand
12:45 UTC+7				Stadium: Terminal 21 Hall

13 December 2019 Thailand Five's	Oman	1–3	Vietnam	Nakhon Ratchasima, Thailand
12:45 UTC+7				Stadium: Terminal 21 Hall

15 December 2019 Thailand Five's	Thailand	3–1	Vietnam	Nakhon Ratchasima, Thailand
15:00 UTC+7				Stadium: Terminal 21 Hall

== 2020 ==
12 February 2020 Hybrid friendly	UMA Antequera (Spain)	3–1	Vietnam	Málaga, Spain
		Report

14 February 2020 Hybrid friendly	Málaga (Spain)	2–6	Vietnam	Málaga, Spain
		Report

18 February 2020 Hybrid friendly	Real Betis (Spain)	2–1	Vietnam	Seville, Spain
		Report

22 February 2020 Friendly	Saudi Arabia	Cancelled	Vietnam	Ashgabat, Turkmenistan

TBD 2021 Asian Cup GS	Vietnam	Cancelled (Note: The tournament was originally scheduled to be played in Turkmenistan between 26 February and 8 March 2020. However, the Asian Football Confederation (AFC) announced on 3 February 2020 that due to the COVID-19 pandemic, the tournament had been postponed. On 9 March 2020, FIFA and AFC announced that the tournament were postponed to 5–16 August 2020, but in July 2020, the tournament schedule was moved again to 4–15 November 2020. On 10 September 2020, the AFC announced that the tournament would instead be held in Kuwait between 2–13 December 2020. On 15 October 2020, the AFC announced that due to spike of COVID-19 cases in Kuwait, the tournament was further postponed to 2021. On 10 November 2020, the AFC approved the new dates as between 23 March and 3 April 2021. However, AFC announced the cancellation of the tournament on 25 January 2021.)	Tajikistan	TBD, Kuwait
TBD				Stadium: TBD

TBD 2021 Asian Cup GS	Oman	Cancelled	Vietnam	TBD, Kuwait
TBD				Stadium: TBD

TBD 2021 Asian CUp GS	Turkmenistan	Cancelled	Vietnam	TBD, Kuwait
TBD				Stadium: TBD

== 2021 ==
17 May 2021 Friendly	Vietnam	2–1	Iraq	Khor Fakkan, United Arab Emirates
				Stadium: Khor Fakkan Futsal Club Hall

23 May 2021 World Cup qualifying	Vietnam	0–0	Lebanon	Khor Fakkan, United Arab Emirates
19:00 UTC+4		Report		Stadium: Khor Fakkan Futsal Club Hall; Attendance: 0 Referee: Nurdin Bukuev (Kyrgyzstan)

25 May 2021 World Cup qualifying	Lebanon	1–1 (1–1 agg.)	Vietnam	Khor Fakkan, United Arab Emirates
19:00 UTC+4	Tneich 37'	Report	Châu Đoàn Phát 37'	Stadium: Khor Fakkan Futsal Club Hall; Attendance: 0 Referee: Gelareh Nazemi Deylami (Iran)
Note: 1–1 on aggregate; Vietnam won on away goals

28 August 2021 Four Nations Tournament	Vietnam	0–1	Japan	Jaén, Spain
18:00 UTC+1			Shimizu 34' (pen.)	Stadium: Olivo Arena

31 August 2021 Four Nations Tournament	Spain	4–0	Vietnam	Jaén, Spain
	Borja Diez 3'; Javier Solano 14'; Sergio Gonzalez 19'; Raúl Campos 23'			Stadium: Olivo Arena

2 September 2021 Four Nations Tournament	Vietnam	Cancelled	Guatemala	Jaén, Spain
18:00 UTC+1				Stadium: Olivo Arena

3 September 2021 Hybrid friendly	Córdoba (Spain)	2–2	Vietnam	Córdoba, Spain
20:00 UTC+1	Ricardo 22'; Zequi 35'		Nguyễn Minh Trí 1'; Trần Văn Vũ 36'	Stadium: Vista Alegre Municipal Sports Palace; Attendance: 800

6 September 2021 Friendly	Vietnam	1–2	Morocco	Vilnius, Lithuania
19:00 UTC+3	Vũ Đức Tùng 33' (pen.)		2' 7'

13 September 2021 World Cup GS	Vietnam	1–9	Brazil	Klaipėda, Lithuania
20:00 (UTC+3)	Khổng Đình Hùng 14'	Report (FIFA)	Rodrigo 3'; Ferrão 5', 7', 21', 24'; Dieguinho 14', 28'; Pito 19'; Leozinho 36'	Stadium: Švyturys Arena; Attendance: 667; Referee: Juan Cordero (Spain)

16 September 2021 World Cup GS	Panama	2–3	Vietnam	Klaipėda, Lithuania
18:00 (UTC+3)	Castrellon 10', 20'	Report (FIFA)	Nguyễn Minh Trí 2'; Châu Đoàn Phát 8'; Nguyễn Văn Hiếu 27'	Stadium: Švyturys Arena; Attendance: 767; Referee: Eduardo Fernades (Portugal)

19 September 2021 World Cup GS	Czech Republic	1–1	Vietnam	Kaunas, Lithuania
16:00 (UTC+3)	Rešetár 36'	Report (FIFA)	Châu Đoàn Phát 35'	Stadium: Žalgiris Arena; Attendance: 280; Referee: Mariá Estefanía Pinto (Argentina)

22 September 2021 World Cup R16	RFU	3–2	Vietnam	Vilnius, Lithuania
17:30 (UTC+3)	Robinho 11'; Chishkala 18', 30'	Report (FIFA)	Nguyễn Đắc Huy 18'; Phạm Đức Hòa 39'	Stadium: Avia Solutions Group Arena; Attendance: 622; Referee: Roberto Enrique López Fernández (Panama)

== 2022 ==
25 March 2022 Hybrid friendly	Thammasat Stallion (Thailand)	3–1	Vietnam	Samut Sakhon, Thailand
--:-- UTC+7		Report		Stadium: Hongyen Thakam Stadium

28 March 2022 Hybrid friendly	Bangkok BTS (Thailand)	1–1	Vietnam	Bangkok, Thailand
--:-- UTC+7		Report		Stadium: His Majesty the King's 72nd Birthday Anniversary Gymnasium

30 March 2022 Hybrid friendly	Hongyen Thakam (Thailand)	2–2	Vietnam	Samut Sakhon, Thailand
--:-- UTC+7		Report		Stadium: Hongyen Thakam Stadium

4 April 2022 AFF Championship GS	Vietnam	1–1	Myanmar	Bangkok, Thailand
11:00 UTC+7	Nhan Gia Hưng 11'	Report	Myo Myint Soe 27'	Stadium: Indoor Stadium Huamark

5 April 2022 AFF Championship GS	Timor-Leste	1–7	Vietnam	Bangkok, Thailand
13:00 UTC+7	Cesario 17'	Report	Nguyễn Thịnh Phát 1', 20' Trần Thái Huy 19' Lê Quốc Nam 23' Nguyễn Văn Hiếu 23', 28' Nguyễn Minh Trí 30'	Stadium: Indoor Stadium Huamark

6 April 2022 AFF Championship GS	Vietnam	5–1	Australia	Bangkok, Thailand
11:00 UTC+7	Nguyễn Thịnh Phát 13', 34'; Trần Thái Huy 20'; Châu Đoàn Phát 35'; Nguyễn Văn Hiếu 38'	Report	Danel Fornito 27' (pen.)	Stadium: Indoor Stadium Huamark

8 April 2022 AFF Championship SF	Vietnam	1–3	Thailand	Bangkok, Thailand
17:00 UTC+7	Nguyễn Minh Trí 32'	Report	Osamanmusa 21', 36'; Kritsada 40'	Stadium: Indoor Stadium Huamark

10 April 2022 AFF Championship 3rd Place	Myanmar	1–1 (1–4 p)	Vietnam	Bangkok, Thailand
14:30 UTC+7	Khin Zaw Lin 40'	Report	Nguyễn Thịnh Phát 29'	Stadium: Indoor Stadium Huamark
	Penalties
	(penalty missed) Myo Myint Soe; (penalty missed) Aung Min Oo; (penalty scored) Nyein Min Soe		(penalty scored) Trần Văn Vũ; (penalty scored) Phạm Đức Hoà; (penalty scored) Khổng Đình Hùng; (penalty scored) Nguyễn Minh Trí

11 May 2022 SEA Games	Vietnam	1–1	Indonesia	Hà Nam, Vietnam
16:00 UTC+7	Nguyễn Minh Trí 2'		Syauqi Saud 34'	Stadium: Hà Nam Gymnasium

14 May 2022 SEA Games	Vietnam	7–1	Malaysia	Hà Nam, Vietnam
16:00 UTC+7	Nguyễn Minh Trí 2', 38'; Nguyễn Thịnh Phát 7', 12'; Lê Quốc Nam 18'; Nguyễn Mạnh Dũng 19'		Ekmal 2'	Stadium: Hà Nam Gymnasium

18 May 2022 SEA Games	Myanmar	0–4	Vietnam	Hà Nam, Vietnam
16:00 UTC+7			Phạm Đức Hòa 23'; Lương Thái Huy 24'; Nguyễn Minh Trí 24'; Châu Đoàn Phát 33'	Stadium: Hà Nam Gymnasium

20 May 2022 SEA Games	Vietnam	0–2	Thailand	Hà Nam, Vietnam
16:00 UTC+7			Osamanmusa 2'; Peerapat 10'	Stadium: Hà Nam Gymnasium

12 September 2022 Continental Championship	Finland	4–2	Vietnam	Bangkok, Thailand
17:00 UTC+7				Stadium: Indoor Stadium Huamark

13 September 2022 Continental Championship	Vietnam	1–3	Iran	Bangkok, Thailand
17:00 UTC+7				Stadium: Indoor Stadium Huamark

15 September 2022 Continental Championship	Mozambique	1–3	Vietnam	Bangkok, Thailand
14:00 UTC+7				Stadium: Indoor Stadium Huamark

28 September 2022 Asian Cup GS	Vietnam	5–1	South Korea	Kuwait City, Kuwait
11:00 UTC+3	Shin Jong-hoon 2' (o.g.); Trần Thái Huy 15', 34'; Phạm Đức Hòa 17', 35'	Report	Shin Jong-hoon 1'	Stadium: Saad Al Abdullah Hall; Referee: Benjapol Mucharoensap (Thailand)

30 September 2022 Asian Cup GS	Saudi Arabia	1–3	Vietnam	Kuwait City, Kuwait
14:00 UTC+3	Châu Đoàn Phát 31' (o.g.)	Report	Nguyễn Anh Duy 11'; Châu Đoàn Phát 28'; Nguyễn Minh Trí 40'	Stadium: Saad Al Abdullah Hall; Referee: Osama Saeed (Bahrain)

2 October 2022 Asian Cup GS	Japan	2–0	Vietnam	Kuwait City, Kuwait
14:00 UTC+3	Shimizu 5', 36'	Report		Stadium: Saad Al Abdullah Hall; Referee: Pornnarong Grairod (Thailand)

4 October 2022 Asian Cup QF	Iran	8–1	Vietnam	Kuwait City, Kuwait
11:00 UTC+3	Aghapour 9'; Rafieipour 9'; Tayyebi 15', 32', 33'; Bazyar 24'; Oladghobad 27'; Ahmadabbasi 37'	Report	Phạm Đức Hòa 37'	Stadium: Saad Al Abdullah Hall; Referee: Hiroyuki Kobayashi (Japan)

== 2023 ==
25 May 2023 Friendly	Vietnam	5–0	Solomon Islands	Ho Chi Minh City, Vietnam
17:00 (UTC+07:00)	Talo 16' (o.g.); Nguyễn Trần Duy 32'; Nguyễn Thịnh Phát 35'; Dương Ngọc Linh 37'; Nguyễn Hữu Phúc 40'	Report		Stadium: Thái Sơn Nam District 8 Attendance: 500

26 May 2023 Friendly	Vietnam	5–0	Solomon Islands	Ho Chi Minh City, Vietnam
17:00 (UTC+07:00)	Từ Minh Quang 1'; Nguyễn Thịnh Phát 18'; Nguyễn Minh Trí 25', 35'; Nguyễn Văn Tuấn 34'	Report		Stadium: Thái Sơn Nam District 8 Attendance: 500

4 June 2023 Friendly	Paraguay	3–2	Vietnam	Asunción, Paraguay
16:00 (UTC-04:00)				Stadium: Sol De America

6 June 2023 Friendly	Paraguay	4–4	Vietnam	Asunción, Paraguay
21:00 (UTC-04:00)				Stadium: Sol De America

8 June 2023 Friendly	Paraguay	2–0	Vietnam	Asunción, Paraguay
21:00 (UTC-04:00)				Stadium: Sol De America

10 June 2023 Friendly	Argentina	4–1	Vietnam	Buenos Aires, Argentina

14 June 2023 Friendly	Argentina	3–0	Vietnam	Rosario, Argentina

15 September 2023 Friendly	Vietnam	1–1	Hungary	Ho Chi Minh City, Vietnam
16:00 (UTC+07:00)			Dróth 7'	Stadium: Thai Son Nam District 8 Arena

17 September 2023 Friendly	Vietnam	1–4	Hungary	Ho Chi Minh City, Vietnam
16:00 (UTC+07:00)	Nguyễn Minh Trí 38'		Vas 13'; Pál 21'; Nagy 24'; Rábl 36'	Stadium: Lãnh Binh Thăng

19 September 2023 Friendly	Vietnam	3–3	Russia	Ho Chi Minh City, Vietnam
16:00 (UTC+07:00)				Stadium: Lãnh Binh Thăng

7 October 2023 Asian Cup qualifiers	Vietnam	6–1	Mongolia	Ulaanbaatar, Mongolia
14:00 (UTC+08:00)	Nguyễn Thịnh Phát 9', 22'; Nguyễn Minh Trí 12'; Nhan Gia Hưng 21'; Ngô Ngọc Sơn 27'; Phạm Đức Hòa 31'		Altantulga 22'	Stadium: Buyant Ukhaa Sports Palace

9 October 2023 Asian Cup qualifiers	Nepal	0–5	Vietnam	Ulaanbaatar, Mongolia
14:00 (UTC+08:00)			Châu Đoàn Phát 2', 40'; Dương Ngọc Linh 9'; Nguyễn Minh Trí 19'; Từ Minh Quang 22'	Stadium: Buyant Ukhaa Sports Palace

11 October 2023 Asian Cup qualifiers	Vietnam	5–2	South Korea	Ulaanbaatar, Mongolia
14:00 (UTC+08:00)	Dương Ngọc Linh 15', 29'; Nhan Gia Hưng 16'; Đinh Công Viên 29'; Nguyễn Minh Trí 35'		Eom Jiyong 23'; Shin Jonghoon 40'	Stadium: Buyant Ukhaa Sports Palace

== 2024 ==
28 March 2024 Ho Chi Minh City Tournament	Vietnam	2–2	New Zealand	Ho Chi Minh City, Vietnam
17:00 (UTC+07:00)	Chu Văn Tiến 8'; Trần Thái Huy 17'		Ali 9', 21'	Stadium: Lãnh Binh Thăng

30 March 2024 Ho Chi Minh City Tournament	Morocco	3–3	Vietnam	Ho Chi Minh City, Vietnam
17:00 (UTC+07:00)				Stadium: Lãnh Binh Thăng

31 March 2024 Ho Chi Minh City Tournament	Vietnam	1–3	Iran	Ho Chi Minh City, Vietnam
17:00 (UTC+07:00)				Stadium: Lãnh Binh Thăng

6 April 2024 Friendly	Vietnam	3–0	Malaysia	Ho Chi Minh City, Vietnam
(UTC+07:00)				Stadium: Lãnh Binh Thăng; Attendance: 0

8 April 2024 Friendly	Vietnam	1–3	Malaysia	Ho Chi Minh City, Vietnam
(UTC+07:00)				Stadium: Lãnh Binh Thăng; Attendance: 0

17 April 2024 Asian Cup GS	Vietnam	1–1	Myanmar	Bangkok, Thailand
14:00 (UTC+07:00)	Đào Minh Quảng 23'		Ko Ko Lwin 28'	Stadium: Indoor Stadium Huamark

19 April 2024 Asian Cup GS	China	0–1	Vietnam	Bangkok, Thailand
14:00 (UTC+07:00)			Nhan Gia Hưng 10' (pen.)	Stadium: Indoor Stadium Huamark

21 April 2024 Asian Cup GS	Thailand	2–1	Vietnam	Bangkok, Thailand
18:00 (UTC+07:00)	Muhammad 11'; Worasak 29'		Từ Minh Quang 20'	Stadium: Indoor Stadium Huamark

24 April 2024 Asian Cup	Uzbekistan	2–1	Vietnam	Bangkok, Thailand
21:00 (UTC+07:00)	Tukinov 34'; Juraev 40'		Nguyễn Thịnh Phát 17'	Stadium: Bangkok Arena

26 April 2024 World Cup qualifier	Vietnam	2–3	Kyrgyzstan	Bangkok, Thailand
16:00 (UTC+07:00)	Nguyễn Mạnh Dũng 13', 38'		Alimov 9'; Makhmadaminov 24'; Talaibekov 39'	Stadium: Bangkok Arena

27 October Hybrid friendly	Hongyen Thakam (Thailand)	4–6	Vietnam	Bangkok, Thailand
--:-- UTC+7

29 October Friendly	Vietnam	5–3	Australia	Bangkok, Thailand
--:-- UTC+7

2 November ASEAN Championship GS	Vietnam	4–1	Timor-Leste	Nakhon Ratchasima, Thailand
15:30 UTC+7	Nhan Gia Hưng 3'; Nguyễn Mạnh Dũng 25'; Nguyễn Thịnh Phát 36', 40'	Report	Cesario 23'	Stadium: Terminal 21; Referee: Wahyu Wicaksono (Indonesia)

4 November ASEAN Championship GS	Malaysia	0–2	Vietnam	Nakhon Ratchasima, Thailand
15:30 UTC+7		Report	Từ Minh Quang 27'; Nguyễn Thịnh Phát 34'	Stadium: Terminal 21; Referee: Wahyu Wicaksono (Indonesia)

5 November ASEAN Championship GS	Vietnam	14–0	Brunei	Nakhon Ratchasima, Thailand
15:30 UTC+7	Trần Thái Huy 2', 3', 27'; Châu Đoàn Phát 10'; Trần Nhật Trung 21'; Nguyễn Mạnh Dũng 22'; Phạm Đức Hòa 26'; Nguyễn Thịnh Phát 31'; Từ Minh Quang 33', 34'; Huỳnh Mi Woen 35', 36'; Nguyễn Đa Hải 38'; Vũ Ngọc Ánh 39'	Report		Stadium: Terminal 21; Referee: Wint Phyo Pyae Sone (Myanmar)

6 November ASEAN Championship GS	Thailand	2–3	Vietnam	Nakhon Ratchasima, Thailand
18:00 UTC+7	Nguyễn Thịnh Phát 5' (o.g.); Thanachot 31'	Report	Phạm Đức Hòa 12'; Đinh Công Viên 34', 35'	Stadium: Terminal 21; Attendance: 2,416; Referee: Moon Dae-sung (South Korea)

8 November ASEAN Championship SF	Vietnam	5–4 (a.e.t.)	Australia	Nakhon Ratchasima, Thailand
15:00 UTC+7	Từ Minh Quang 31' (pen.); Nguyễn Đa Hải 36', 38'; Nguyễn Thịnh Phát 46', 50' (pen.)	Report	Sewell 6'; Rogan 20'; Guerreiro 36'; Lynch 49'	Stadium: Terminal 21

10 November ASEAN Championship F	Vietnam	0–2	Indonesia	Nakhon Ratchasima, Thailand
18:00 UTC+7			Syaifullah 8'; Rizki 39'	Stadium: Terminal 21

== 2025 ==
8 April Friendly	Vietnam	2–1	Saudi Arabia	Ho Chi Minh City, Vietnam
18:00 UTC+7	Nguyễn Thịnh Phát 23'; Vũ Ngọc Ánh 32'	Report	Fahad 38'	Stadium: Thái Sơn Nam Arena

10 April Friendly	Vietnam	3–2	Saudi Arabia	Ho Chi Minh City, Vietnam
18:00 UTC+7	Nguyễn Mạnh Dũng 26'; Al-Dossary 33' (o.g.); Trần Thái Huy 40'	Report	Aroan 39'; Ahmed 40'	Stadium: Lãnh Binh Thăng

13 April Friendly	Vietnam	4–1	Kazakhstan	Ho Chi Minh City, Vietnam
18:00 UTC+7	Từ Minh Quang 15'; Châu Đoàn Phát 39'; Hồ Văn Ý 40'; Đinh Công Viên 40'	Report	Karmenov 33'	Stadium: Lãnh Bình Thăng

15 April Friendly	Vietnam	2–2	Kazakhstan	Ho Chi Minh City, Vietnam
18:00 UTC+7	Đinh Công Viên 16'; Nguyễn Mạnh Dũng 23'	Report	Sagyndykov 10'; Piyaly 12'	Stadium: Thái Sơn Nam Arena

11 September Friendly	Kuwait	2–3	Vietnam	Kuwait City, Kuwait
--:--

13 September Friendly	Kuwait	1–3	Vietnam	Kuwait City, Kuwait
--:--

20 September Asian Cup qualifiers	Vietnam	9–1	Hong Kong	Hangzhou, China
15:30 UTC+8	Châu Đoàn Phát 5'; Nguyễn Thịnh Phát 6'; Nhan Gia Hưng 10'; Nguyễn Đa Hải 18'; Phạm Đức Hòa 19'; Từ Minh Quang 21', 33', 40'; Nguyễn Mạnh Dũng 33'	Report	Tsang Tsz Hin 21'	Stadium: Linping Sports Centre Gymnasium

22 September Asian Cup qualifiers	China	2–7	Vietnam	Hangzhou, China
19:30 UTC+8	Paiheiertudahong 37'; Yimamu 39'	Report	Trần Quang Nguyên 1'; Vũ Ngọc Ánh 3', 3'; Nguyễn Đa Hải 10'; Nguyễn Thịnh Phát 16', 33', 34'	Stadium: Linping Sports Centre Gymnasium

24 September Asian Cup qualifiers	Vietnam	4–0	Lebanon	Hangzhou, China
15:30 UTC+8	Nguyễn Đa Hải 9'; Nguyễn Mạnh Dũng 9'; Từ Minh Quang 11'; Vũ Ngọc Ánh 25'			Stadium: Linping Sports Centre Gymnasium

16 December SEA Games	Malaysia	4–2	Vietnam	Nonthaburi, Thailand
16:00 UTC+7	Harith 4'; Syahir 7', 21'; Awalludin 18'	Report	Nguyễn Đa Hải 3'; Nguyễn Mạnh Dũng 37'	Stadium: Nonthaburi Sports Complex Gymnasium; Referee: Sukhrob Sattorov (Tajikistan)

17 December SEA Games	Vietnam	1–0	Indonesia	Nonthaburi, Thailand
16:00 UTC+7	Từ Minh Quang 11'	Report		Stadium: Nonthaburi Sports Complex Gymnasium; Referee: Ahmad Al Daou (Lebanon)

18 December SEA Games	Vietnam	1–2	Thailand	Nonthaburi, Thailand
19:00 UTC+7	Nguyễn Đa Hải 30'	Report	Muhammad Osamanmusa 15'; Itticha Praphaphan 29'	Stadium: Nonthaburi Sports Complex Gymnasium; Referee: Yahya Alathwani (Saudi Arabia)

19 December SEA Games	Myanmar	2–4	Vietnam	Nonthaburi, Thailand
16:00 UTC+7	Min Khant Thu 31'; Naing Linn Tun Kyaw 40'	Report	Nguyễn Đa Hải 25', 33'; Trịnh Công Đại 36'; Vũ Ngọc Ánh 38'	Stadium: Nonthaburi Sports Complex Gymnasium; Referee: Moon Dae-sung (South Korea)

== 2026 ==
18 January Friendly	Vietnam	3–5	Afghanistan	Ho Chi Minh City, Vietnam
--:-- UTC+7		Report	Kazemi; Reza; Hosseinpoor; S. Mojtaba; S. Morteza	Stadium: Thái Sơn Nam Arena

20 January Friendly	Vietnam	2–5	Afghanistan	Ho Chi Minh City, Vietnam
--:-- UTC+7		Report	S. Mojtaba; Reza; Hosseinpoor	Stadium: Lãnh Binh Thăng

27 January Asian Cup GS	Vietnam	5–4	Kuwait	Jakarta, Indonesia
17:00 UTC+7	Châu Đoàn Phát 8'44"; Nguyễn Thịnh Phát 14'53"; Nguyễn Mạnh Dũng 19'59", 31'58"; Từ Minh Quang 29'23"	Report	Al-Enezi 6'15"; Borashed 8'02"; O. Al-Shatti 18'01"; Al-Sarraj 37'44"	Stadium: Jakarta International Velodrome; Referee: Liu Jianqiao (China)

29 January Asian Cup GS	Lebanon	0–2	Vietnam	Jakarta, Indonesia
13:00 UTC+7		Report	Đinh Công Viên 0'19"; Vũ Ngọc Ánh 3'34"	Stadium: Jakarta International Velodrome; Referee: Helday Idang (Malaysia), Lee Po-Fu (Chinese Taipei)

31 January Asian Cup GS	Thailand	1–0	Vietnam	Jakarta, Indonesia
15:00 UTC+7	Krit 35'05"	Report		Stadium: Indonesia Arena; Referee: Fahad Al-Hosani (United Arab Emirates), Majid Al-Hatmi (Oman)

3 February Asian Cup QF	Indonesia	3–2	Vietnam	Jakarta, Indonesia
19:00 UTC+7	Brian Ick 3'47"; Ardiansyah 10'23"; Gunawan 25'40"	Report	Nguyễn Đa Hải 24'51", 35'43"	Stadium: Indonesia Arena; Attendance: 8,441; Referee: Hawkar Ahmed (Iraq), Pornnarong Grairod (Thailand)

31 March Hybrid friendly	Hongyen Thakam (Thailand)	3–2	Vietnam	Bangkok, Thailand
--:-- UTC+7		Report

2 April Hybrid friendly	Blackpearl United (Thailand)	2–2	Vietnam	Bangkok, Thailand
--:-- UTC+7		Report

6 April ASEAN Championship GS	Vietnam	4–0	Myanmar	Nonthaburi, Thailand
17:30 UTC+7	Nhan Gia Hưng 12'; Nguyễn Đa Hải 21', 22'; Nguyễn Thạc Hiếu 28'	Report		Stadium: Nonthaburi Sports Complex Gymnasium; Referee: Wahyu Wicaksono (Indonesia)

7 April ASEAN Championship GS	Timor-Leste	1–7	Vietnam	Nonthaburi, Thailand
17:30 UTC+7	J. Fernandes 39'	Report	Từ Minh Quang 3'; Nguyễn Thịnh Phát 5'; Nguyễn Đa Hải 12'; Trần Quang Nguyên 20'; Đinh Công Viên 26'; Trịnh Công Đại 30'; Nguyễn Thạc Hiếu 38'	Stadium: Nonthaburi Sports Complex Gymnasium; Referee: Initan Jan Dlanor (Philippines)

9 April ASEAN Championship GS	Thailand	4–2	Vietnam	Nonthaburi, Thailand
20:00 UTC+7	Itticha 16'; Sarawut 20'; Mintada 23'; Vũ Ngọc Ánh 40' (o.g.)	Report	Từ Minh Quang 23'; Nguyễn Đa Hải 35'	Stadium: Nonthaburi Sports Complex Gymnasium; Referee: Kim Tae-wan (South Korea)

10 April ASEAN Championship SF	Indonesia	3–2	Vietnam	Nonthaburi, Thailand
17:00 UTC+7	Kareth 10', 13'; Sanjaya 23'		Nguyễn Đa Hải 22'; Trần Quang Nguyên 30'	Stadium: Nonthaburi Sports Complex Gymnasium; Referee: Moon Dae-sung (South Korea)

12 April ASEAN Championship 3rd place	Vietnam	4–0	Australia	Nonthaburi, Thailand
17:00 UTC+7	Nhan Gia Hưng 3'; Châu Đoàn Phát 18'; Nguyễn Thịnh Phát 21'; Phạm Văn Tú 39'			Stadium: Nonthaburi Sports Complex Gymnasium; Referee: Kim Tae-wan (South Korea)

1 August Continental Futsal Championship	Russia	2–2	Vietnam	Nonthaburi, Thailand
18:00 UTC+7	Pavlov 10'; Pirogov 27'		Nguyễn Thịnh Phát 24'; Trần Thái Huy 25'	Stadium: Nonthaburi Sports Complex Gymnasium

2 August Continental Futsal Championship	New Zealand	1–4	Vietnam	Nonthaburi, Thailand
18:00 UTC+7	Paulsen 31'		Trịnh Công Đại 4'; Châu Đoàn Phát 33'; Nguyễn Thịnh Phát 34'; Trần Thái Huy 36'	Stadium: Nonthaburi Sports Complex Gymnasium

3 August Continental Futsal Championship	Vietnam	2–1	Afghanistan	Nonthaburi, Thailand
20:30 UTC+7	Nguyễn Thịnh Phát 2'; Hosseinpoor 27' (o.g.)		Hosseinpoor 35'	Stadium: Nonthaburi Sports Complex Gymnasium

5 August Continental Futsal Championship	Vietnam	3–3	Thailand	Nonthaburi, Thailand
20:30 UTC+7	Châu Đoàn Phát 31'; Từ Minh Quang 34'; Nguyễn Đa Hải 38'		Therdsak 2'; Panat 7', 14'	Stadium: Nonthaburi Sports Complex Gymnasium
