= Nguyễn Minh Trí =

Vietnamese futsal player

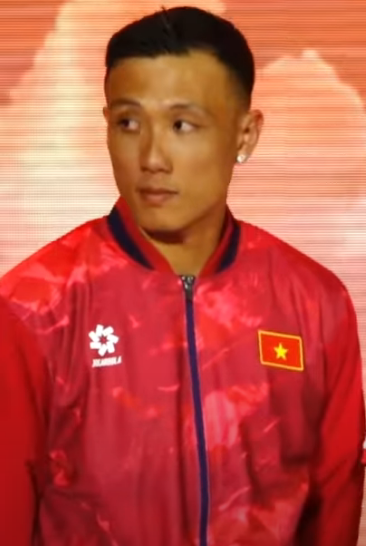
- Minh Trí in 2025

Personal information
- Date of birth: 8 April 1996 (age 30)
- Place of birth: Long An, Vietnam
- Position: Pivot

Youth career
- –2011: Long An

Senior career*
Years	Team	Apps	(Gls)
2011–2026	Thái Sơn Nam HCMC		
2018	→ Cao Bằng (loan)		
2019–2020	→ YSCC Yokohama (loan)	14	(2)

International career
2014–2025	Vietnam		
- * Club domestic league appearances and goals as of AFC Futsal Championship 2016

Nguyễn Minh Trí (born 8 April 1996) is a former Vietnamese futsal player who plays as a pivot (striker).

Minh Trí played for the Vietnam national team between 2014 and 2025, appearing in two World Cups. He won the Vietnamese Golden Ball for futsal players in 2020. With Thái Sơn Nam HCMC, he has been crowned champions several times at Vietnam Futsal League.

== Playing career ==
In 2016, Minh Trí scored a hat-trick in the opening match, helping Vietnam defeat Guatemala at the 2016 FIFA Futsal World Cup. This historic victory helped the Vietnam team advance to the knockout stage during their first ever participation in the tournament.

In 2021, Minh Trí featured in Vietnam's squad for the 2021 FIFA Futsal World Cup. Here, he scored a goal against Panama, thus became the first Vietnamese player to score in two consecutives Futsal World Cup editions.

On 31 March 2026, Minh Trí announced his retirement.

== International goals ==
No.	Date	Venue	Opponent	Score	Result	Competition
1.	8 October 2015	Bangkok, Thailand	Laos	5–1	13–1	2015 AFF Futsal Championship
2.	11 October 2015	Bangkok, Thailand	Philippines	5–0	19–1	2015 AFF Futsal Championship
3.	11 October 2015	Bangkok, Thailand	Philippines	13–1	19–1	2015 AFF Futsal Championship
4.	12 October 2015	Bangkok, Thailand	Australia	2–3	5–6	2015 AFF Futsal Championship
5.	27 October 2017	Hồ Chí Minh City, Vietnam	Philippines	3–0	24–0	2017 AFF Futsal Championship
6.	27 October 2017	Hồ Chí Minh City, Vietnam	Philippines	11–0	24–0	2017 AFF Futsal Championship
7.	28 October 2017	Hồ Chí Minh City, Vietnam	Indonesia	4–3	4–3	2017 AFF Futsal Championship
8.	21 October 2019	Hồ Chí Minh City, Vietnam	Australia	2–0	2–0	2019 AFF Futsal Championship
9.	23 October 2019	Hồ Chí Minh City, Vietnam	Malaysia	3–2	4–2	2019 AFF Futsal Championship
10.	27 October 2019	Hồ Chí Minh City, Vietnam	Myanmar	7–3	7–3	2019 AFF Futsal Championship
11.	5 April 2022	Bangkok, Thailand	Timor-Leste	7–1	7–1	2022 AFF Futsal Championship
12.	8 April 2022	Bangkok, Thailand	Thailand	1–1	1–3	2022 AFF Futsal Championship
13.	11 May 2022	Phủ Lý, Vietnam	Indonesia	1–0	1–1	2021 SEA Games
14.	14 May 2022	Phủ Lý, Vietnam	Malaysia	1–0	7–1	2021 SEA Games
15.	14 May 2022	Phủ Lý, Vietnam	Malaysia	7–1	7–1	2021 SEA Games
16.	18 May 2022	Phủ Lý, Vietnam	Myanmar	3–0	4–0	2021 SEA Games

== Honours ==
Thái Sơn Nam

- Vietnam Futsal League: 2019, 2020, 2021, 2023, 2024

Individual

- Vietnamese Futsal Golden Ball: 2020.
