= 2014 AFF Futsal Championship =

Tournament details
- Host country: Malaysia
- City: Selangor
- Dates: 19–27 September
- Teams: 10 (from 1 confederation)
- Venue: 1 (in 1 host city)

Final positions
- Champions: Thailand (10th title)
- Runners-up: Australia
- Third place: Vietnam
- Fourth place: Indonesia

Tournament statistics
- Matches played: 24
- Goals scored: 224 (9.33 per match)
- Top scorer: (Thailand) Jetsada Chudech (10 goals)

The 2014 AFF Futsal Championship is the 11th edition of the tournament which will be held in Shah Alam, Malaysia from 19 to 27 September 2014. Ten from twelve member nations of the ASEAN Football Federation (AFF) will enter. All matches were played at the Malawati Stadium.

== Venue ==
Malawati Stadium
Capacity: 13,000

== Group stage ==
All times are Malaysia Time (MST) – UTC+8

=== Group A ===
Team	Pld	W	D	L	GF	GA	GD	Pts
Indonesia	4	4	0	0	39	6	33	12
Australia	4	3	0	1	26	4	22	9
Malaysia	4	2	0	2	19	12	7	6
Timor-Leste	4	1	0	3	7	35	−28	3
Brunei	4	0	0	4	2	36	−34	0

19 September 2014
09:00

Brunei	0–2	Timor-Leste
	Report; AFF Report	Timbang 31' (o.g.); Xavier 39'

Stadium Melawati
Shah Alam
Referee: Yuttakon Maiket (Thailand)
19 September 2014
17:30

Malaysia	1–6	Indonesia
Bahrin 10'	Report; AFF Report	Saptaji 3', 35'; Kustiawan 8'; Ladjanibi 24'; Suwardy 25'; Nur Ali 36'

Stadium Melawati
Shah Alam
Referee: Apinan Damkliang (Thailand)

20 September 2014
09:30

Timor-Leste	0–9	Australia
	Report; AFF Report	Seeto 2'; Fogarty 12'; Musumeci 15'; Mundell 18', 32'; W. Giovenali 23'; Guerreiro 25', 27', 35'

Stadium Melawati
Shah Alam
Referee: Hoang Duc Hieu (Vietnam)
20 September 2014
17:00

Brunei	1–6	Malaysia
Sharifuddin 34'	Report; AFF Report	Ahmad 19', 27'; Yatim 20'; Ali 21'; Mohammad 29', 40'

Stadium Melawati
Shah Alam
Referee: Khapasong Xayavongsy (Laos)

21 September 2014
14:30

Australia	13–0	Brunei
G. Giovenali 3'; Seeto 3', 23', 32'; Mundell 8'; Fogarty 13', 16'; Guerreiro 27', 32', 39'; Pivato 29'; Lockhart 34', 35'	Report; AFF Report

Stadium Melawati
Shah Alam
Referee: Apinan Damkliang (Thailand)
21 September 2014
17:00

Indonesia	14–3	Timor-Leste
Silitonga 7', 23'; Saptaji 15', 37'; Ladjanibi 16', 23', 32'; Suwardy 17', 18', 38'; Kustiawan 18', 29'; Lubis 31'; Purnomo 36'	Report; AFF Report	Pereira 8', 11'; Da Silva 9'

Stadium Melawati
Shah Alam
Referee: Emmanuel Elloso (Philippines)

22 September 2014
09:30

Brunei	1–15	Indonesia
Dhiyaulhak 29'	Report; AFF Report	Saptaji 4', 19'; Silitonga 5', 18'; Nur Ali 13'; Suwardy 15', 33'; Ladjanibi 18'; Permana 21', 22'; Lubis 25', 35'; Agustin 29'; Zulfikar 30'; Kustiawan 34'

Stadium Melawati
Shah Alam
Referee: Hoang Duc Hieu (Vietnam)
22 September 2014
17:00

Malaysia	0–3	Australia
	Report (AUS); AFF Report	Niski 6'; G. Giovenali 44'; Fogarty (?)

Stadium Melawati
Shah Alam

23 September 2014
09:30

Indonesia	4–1	Australia
Ladjanibi 4'; Permana 7'; Saptaji 12'; Kustiawan 37'	Report (Indonesian); AFF Report	Basger 24'

Stadium Melawati
Shah Alam
23 September 2014
17:00

Timor-Leste	2–12	Malaysia
Vong 32'; Pereira 38'	Report; AFF Report	Yatim 5', 6'; Bahrin 6'; Sani 8'; Ahmad 9'; Zahari 12', 40'; Mohammad 16', 31', 40'; Adris 19', 36'

Stadium Melawati
Shah Alam
Referee: Hoang Duc Hieu (Vietnam)

=== Group B ===
Team	Pld	W	D	L	GF	GA	GD	Pts
Vietnam	4	4	0	0	37	2	+35	12
Thailand	4	3	0	1	32	8	+24	9
Myanmar	4	2	0	2	31	13	+18	6
Laos	4	0	1	3	5	39	−34	1
Philippines	4	0	1	3	8	51	−43	1

19 September 2014
11:30

Myanmar	1–6	Vietnam
Pyae Phyo Maung (3) 21'	Report; AFF Report	Son 11'; Nam 12'; Vu 14'; Quoc Nam 16'; Thai Huy 17'; Hung 34'

Stadium Melawati
Shah Alam
Referee: Helday Idang (Malaysia)
19 September 2014
15:00

Laos	4–4	Philippines
Vannavong 6'; Phasawaeng 18', 33'; Sinthapaseuth 21'	Report; AFF Report	Reyes 4'; Bocobo 12'; Pasilan 26'; Morallo 40' (pen.)

Stadium Melawati
Shah Alam
Referee: Zulkifli Ahmad (Malaysia)

20 September 2014
12:00

Philippines	1–16	Thailand
Zandi 10'	Report; AFF Report	Piyapan 2'; Atirat 2', 11'; Wanlop 8', 24', 26'; Jetsada 10', 19', 29', 39', 40'; Sorasak 20', 34'; Konghla 30'; Kawin 38'; Piyanat 39'

Stadium Melawati
Shah Alam
Referee: Hj. Dasnan Hj. Abdul Rahman (Brunei)
20 September 2014
14:30

Laos	0–6	Myanmar
	Report; AFF Report	Pyae Phyo Maung (3) 3'; Aung Aung 5'; Khin Zaw Linn 7', 17'; Pyae Phyo Maung (1) 16', 16'

Stadium Melawati
Shah Alam
Referee: Ikwan Budi Laksono (Indonesia)

21 September 2014
09:30

Thailand	11–1	Laos
Atirat 3', 19'; Wanlop 9'; Jetsada 10', 19'; Wiwat 14', 23', 30'; Konghla 19', 22'; Kittipong 29'	Report; AFF Report	Inhtavong 30'

Stadium Melawati
Shah Alam
Referee: Zulkifli Ahmad (Malaysia)
21 September 2014
12:00

Vietnam	11–1	Philippines
Luan 10', 22'; Nam 14', 33'; Dat 25'; Vu 26'; Hoa 27', 28', 36', 39'; Cañedo 34' (o.g.)	Report; AFF Report	Cutamora 35'

Stadium Melawati
Shah Alam
Referee: Noviandry (Indonesia)

22 September 2014
12:00

Laos	0–18	Vietnam
	Report; AFF Report	Phung Trong Luan 2', 10'; Ly Khanh Hung 15', 20'; Ngo Ngoc Son 18', 39'; Tran Long Vu 20', 31', 33'; Trần Văn Vũ 21'; Pham Doc Hua 22', 33', 40'; Le Quoc Nam 23'; Tran Thai Huy 25', 33', 35'; Pham Thanh Dat 28'

Stadium Melawati
Shah Alam
22 September 2014
14:30

Myanmar	4–5	Thailand
Pyae Phyo Maung (3) 31'; Aung Aung 32'; Kanison 37' (o.g.); Nyein Min Soe 40'	Report; AFF Report	Piyapan 3'; Kittipong 9'; Atirat 13'; Jetsada 32', 38'

Stadium Melawati
Shah Alam
Referee: Haji Dasnan Haji Abdullah (Brunei)

23 September 2014
12:00

Philippines	2–20	Myanmar
Simpron 27'; Pinga 28'	Report; AFF Report	Pyae Phyo Maung (3) 1', 26', 27', 35'; Aung Aung 3', 18'; Pyae Phyo Maung (1) 7', 16', 17', 22', 34'; Khin Zaw Linn 9'; Htet Myat Naing 9', 13'; Nyein Min Soe 19', 30'; Kyaw Soe Moe 26'; Naing Ye Kyaw 36', 38', 40'

Stadium Melawati
Shah Alam
Referee: Noviandry (Indonesia)
23 September 2014
14:30

Vietnam	2–0	Thailand
Pham Duc Hoa (red card) ?'; Nam 31'; Luan 35'	Report; AFF Report	Jetsada (red card) ?'; Rattana (red card) 29'

Stadium Melawati
Shah Alam
Referee: Zulkifli Ahmad (Malaysia)

== Knockout stage ==
Semi-finals
25 September – Shah Alam
Indonesia	0
Thailand	1
25 September – Shah Alam
Vietnam	3
Australia (a.e.t.)	4

Final
27 September – Shah Alam
Thailand	6
Australia	0
Third place
27 September – Shah Alam
Indonesia	2(3)
Vietnam (p)	2(5)

=== Semi-finals ===
25 September 2014
14:00

Indonesia	0–1	Thailand
	Report; AFF Report	Wanlop 40'

Stadium Melawati
Shah Alam
Referee: Helday Idang (Malaysia)
25 September 2014
17:00

Vietnam	3–4 (a.e.t.)	Australia
Luan 7', 36'; Quan 39'	Report; AFF Report	Basger 19'; Fogarty 22', 48'; G. Giovenali 36'

Stadium Melawati
Shah Alam
Referee: Zulkifli Ahmad (Malaysia)

=== Third place play-off ===
27 September 2014
14:00

Indonesia	2–2	Vietnam
Ladjanibi 31'; Silitonga 32'	Report (Indonesian); AFF Report	Nam 10'; L.Vu 14'
Penalties
Ladjanibi (penalty missed); Kustiawan (penalty scored)	1–3	(penalty scored) V.Vu; (penalty scored) Quan; (penalty scored) Hoa

Stadium Melawati
Shah Alam

=== Final ===
27 September 2014
17:00

Thailand	6–0	Australia
Piyapan 6', 24'; Jetsada 7'; Wanlop 29'; Konghla 34'; Sorasak 40'	Report (Malaysian); AFF Report

Stadium Melawati
Shah Alam

== Winner ==
2014 ASEAN Futsal Championship winners

Thailand
10th title

== Goalscorers ==
10 goals

- (Thailand) Jetsada Chudech

7 goals

- (Indonesia) Bambang Bayu Saptaji
- (Indonesia) Jaelani Ladjanibi
- (Myanmar) Pyae Phyo Maung (1)
- (Myanmar) Pyae Phyo Maung (3)

6 goals

- (Australia) Daniel Fogarty
- (Australia) Jordan Guerreiro
- (Indonesia) Ardy Dwi Suwardy
- (Thailand) Wanlop Pansomsua

5 goals

- (Indonesia) Andri Kustiawan
- (Indonesia) Caisar Octavianus
- (Malaysia) Muhammad Fariq Mohammad
- (Thailand) Atirat Sittisak
- (Vietnam) Phung Trong Luan
- (Vietnam) Le Quoc Nam

4 goals

- (Australia) Tobias Seeto
- (Myanmar) Aung Aung
- (Thailand) Kongla Lekkla
- (Thailand) Piyapan Ratana
- (Vietnam) Pham Duc Hoa

3 goals

- (Australia) Gregory Giovenali
- (Australia) Jordan Mundell
- (Indonesia) Syahidanysah Lubis
- (Indonesia) Fhandy Permana
- (Malaysia) Saiful Aula Ahmad
- (Malaysia) Muhamad Fitri Muhamad Yatim
- (Myanmar) Khin Zaw Linn
- (Myanmar) Naing Ye Kyaw
- (Myanmar) Nyein Min Soe
- (Thailand) Sorasak Poonjangreed
- (Thailand) Wiwat Thaijaroen
- (Timor-Leste) Manuel Varela Da Silva Pereira
- (Vietnam) Tran Long Vu

2 goals

- (Australia) Jarrod Basger
- (Australia) Dean Lockhart
- (Indonesia) Nur Ali
- (Laos) Soulichanh Phasawaeng
- (Malaysia) Akmarulnizam Mohd Adris
- (Malaysia) Mohd Khairul Effendy Mohd Bahrin
- (Malaysia) Mohd Asmie Amir Zahari
- (Myanmar) Htet Myat Naing
- (Thailand) Kittipong Sonsuwan

1 goal

- (Australia) Nathan Niski
- (Australia) Wade Giovenali
- (Australia) Clayton Musumeci
- (Australia) Bruno Pivato
- (Brunei) Muhd Dhiyaulhak Awang Abd Rahim
- (Brunei) Mohammad Sharifuddin Marji
- (Indonesia) Andriansyah Agustin
- (Indonesia) Indra Kurnia Purnomo
- (Indonesia) Ahmad Zulfikar
- (Laos) Saysana Inhtavong
- (Laos) Panida Sinthapaseuth
- (Laos) Vilakone Vannavong
- (Malaysia) Saiful Nizam Mohd Ali
- (Malaysia) Mohammad Shami Abdullah Sani
- (Myanmar) Kyaw Soe Moe
- (Philippines) Patrick Bocobo
- (Philippines) Jayson Cutamora
- (Philippines) Jake Morallo
- (Philippines) Floriano Pasilan
- (Philippines) Andres Pinga
- (Philippines) Michael Reyes
- (Philippines) Jovanie Simpron
- (Philippines) Daryoush Rey Zandi
- (Thailand) Kawin Wiboonratchakit
- (Thailand) Piyanat Nusaya
- (Timor-Leste) Juvito Correia Da Silva
- (Timor-Leste) Jose G. De Jesus C. Vong
- (Timor-Leste) Fernando Baptista Xavier
- (Vietnam) Pham Thanh Dat
- (Vietnam) Ly Khanh Hung
- (Vietnam) Nguyen Bao Quan
- (Vietnam) Quoc Nam
- (Vietnam) Ngo Ngoc Son
- (Vietnam) Thai Huy

=== Own goal ===
1 own goals

- (Brunei) Ak Muhammad Naqib Pg Timbang (for Timor-Leste)
- (Philippines) Robert Cañedo (for Vietnam)
- (Thailand) Kanison Phoopun (for Myanmar)

== Team statistics ==
This table will show the ranking of teams throughout the tournament.

Pos	Team	Pld	W	D	L	GF	GA	GD
Ranking stage
1	Thailand	6	6	0	0	39	8	+31
2	Australia	6	4	0	2	30	13	+27
3	Vietnam	6	5	0	1	42	8	+34
4	Indonesia	6	4	0	2	41	9	+32
5	Myanmar	4	2	0	2	31	13	+28
6	Malaysia	4	2	0	2	19	12	+7
7	Timor-Leste	4	1	0	3	7	35	–28
8	Laos	4	0	1	3	5	39	–34
9	Philippines	4	0	1	3	8	51	–43
10	Brunei	4	0	0	4	2	36	-34
