= Futsal at the 2021 SEA Games – Men's tournament =

2021 Southeast Asian Games -Men's Futsal Tournament
Tournament details
- Host country: Vietnam
- Dates: 11–20 May 2022
- Teams: 5 (from 5 associations)
- Venue: 1 (in 1 host city)

Final positions
- Champions: Thailand (5th title)
- Runners-up: Indonesia
- Third place: Vietnam
- Fourth place: Myanmar

Tournament statistics
- Matches played: 10
- Goals scored: 46 (4.6 per match)
- Top scorer(s): (Malaysia) Ekmal Shahrin (Thailand) Peerapat Kaewwilai (Vietnam) Nguyễn Minh Trí (4 goals each)

The men's futsal tournament at the 2021 SEA Games was held from 11 to 20 May in Vietnam. In this tournament, 5 Southeast Asian teams played in the men's competition.

All matches were played at Hà Nam Gymnasium in Phủ Lý, Hà Nam.

== Competition schedule ==
The following was the competition schedule for the men's futsal competitions:

RR	Round robin

Wed 11	Thu 12	Fri 13	Sat 14	Sun 15	Mon 16	Tue 17	Wed 18	Thu19	Fri 20
RR			RR		RR		RR		RR

== Venue ==
Futsal at the 2021 SEA Games – Men's tournament (Vietnam)	Hà Nam
Futsal at the 2021 SEA Games – Men's tournament (Vietnam)	Hà Nam Gymnasium
Futsal at the 2021 SEA Games – Men's tournament (Vietnam)	Capacity: 7,500

== Participating nations ==
The following five teams participated for the competition.

- Indonesia (INA)
- Malaysia (MAS)
- Myanmar (MYA)
- Thailand (THA)
- Vietnam (VIE)

== Draw ==
There is no official draw since only 5 teams participating in this competition. All teams are automatically drawn to one group.

== Competition format ==
- Round robin; the team with the best record wins the gold medal.

== Final ranking ==
Pos	Team	Pld	W	D	L	GF	GA	GD	Pts	Final Result
1	Thailand	4	3	1	0	11	4	+7	10	Gold medal
2	Indonesia	4	2	2	0	11	2	+9	8	Silver medal
3	Vietnam (H)	4	2	1	1	12	4	+8	7	Bronze medal
4	Myanmar	4	0	1	3	5	16	−11	1	
5	Malaysia	4	0	1	3	7	20	−13	1	

(H) Hosts

== Results ==
- All times are Vietnam Standard Time (UTC+7).
11 May 2022
13:00

Malaysia	2–6	Thailand
Ekmal 35'; Khairul 36'		Ronnachai 1', 19'; Peerapat 6', 16', 38' (pen.); Osamanmusa 8'

Hà Nam Gymnasium, Hà Nam
11 May 2022
16:00

Vietnam	1–1	Indonesia
Nguyễn Minh Trí 2'		Syauqi 33'

Hà Nam Gymnasium, Hà Nam

14 May 2022
13:00

Indonesia	6–0	Myanmar
Runtuboy 5'; Iqbal 22'; Syauqi 27'; Soumilena 33', 38'; Ardiansyah N. 34'

Hà Nam Gymnasium, Hà Nam
14 May 2022
16:00

Vietnam	7–1	Malaysia
Nguyễn Minh Trí 2', 38'; Nguyễn Thịnh Phát 5', 12', 37'; Lê Quốc Nam 18'; Nguyễn Mạnh Dũng 19'		Ekmal 2'

Hà Nam Gymnasium, Hà Nam

16 May 2022
13:00

Malaysia	0–3	Indonesia
		Syauqi 17'; Firman 21', 22'

Hà Nam Gymnasium, Hà Nam
16 May 2022
16:00

Thailand	2–1	Myanmar
Panat 3'; Kritsada 13'		Thyne Phwet Aung 13'

Hà Nam Gymnasium, Hà Nam

18 May 2022
13:00

Indonesia	1–1	Thailand
Runtuboy 23'		Apiwat 23'

Hà Nam Gymnasium, Hà Nam
18 May 2022
16:00

Myanmar	0–4	Vietnam
		Phạm Đức Hòa 23'; Trần Thái Huy 23'; Nguyễn Minh Trí 24'; Châu Đoàn Phát 33'

Hà Nam Gymnasium, Hà Nam

20 May 2022
13:00

Myanmar	4–4	Malaysia
Thyne Phwet Aung 13', 19'; Myo Thet Aung 14'; Myo Myint Soe 15'		Ekmal 25', 38' (pen.); Azri 30'; Khairul 39'

Hà Nam Gymnasium, Hà Nam
20 May 2022
16:00

Vietnam	0–2	Thailand
		Osamanmusa 2'; Peerapat 10'

Hà Nam Gymnasium, Hà Nam

== Goalscorers ==
There were 46 goals scored in 10 matches, for an average of 4.6 goals per match.

4 goals

- (Malaysia) Ekmal Shahrin
- (Thailand) Peerapat Kaewwilai
- (Vietnam) Nguyễn Minh Trí

3 goals

- (Myanmar) Thyne Phwet Aung
- (Indonesia) Syauqi Saud
- (Vietnam) Nguyễn Thịnh Phát

2 goals

- (Malaysia) Khairul Effendy
- (Indonesia) Ardiansyah Runtuboy
- (Indonesia) Firman Adriansyah
- (Indonesia) Evan Soumilena
- (Thailand) Muhammad Osamanmusa
- (Thailand) Ronnachai Jungwongsuk

1 goal

- (Malaysia) Azri Rahman
- (Myanmar) Myo Myint Soe
- (Myanmar) Myo Thet Aung
- (Indonesia) Ardiansyah Nur
- (Indonesia) Muhammad Iqbal Rahmatullah
- (Thailand) Apiwat Chaemcharoen
- (Thailand) Kritsada Wongkaeo
- (Thailand) Panat Kittipanuwong
- (Vietnam) Châu Đoàn Phát
- (Vietnam) Lê Quốc Nam
- (Vietnam) Nguyễn Mạnh Dũng
- (Vietnam) Phạm Đức Hòa
- (Vietnam) Trần Thái Huy

== See also ==
- Futsal at the 2021 SEA Games
- Futsal at the 2021 SEA Games - Women's tournament
- 2021 SEA Games
