= Grant Lynch =

Australian association football and futsal player

- Born: 4 August 1993 (age 33)
- Occupations: Health care worker Association football player Futsal player
Association football career
- Position: Defender
Team information
- Current team: Blacktown City
- Number: 5
Senior career*
Years	Team	Apps	(Gls)
2014–2016	Bankstown City Lions	68	(10)
2017–	Blacktown City	105	(8)
International career^{‡}
2016–	Australia (futsal)		
- * Club domestic league appearances and goals as of 17 August 2024 ‡ National team caps and goals as of 20 March 2024

Grant Lynch (born 4 August 1993) is an Australian association football and futsal player for Blacktown City in the National Premier Leagues NSW and the Australia national futsal team. Outside of football, Lynch works in health care.

A former player of Bankstown City Lions, Lynch moved to Blacktown City in early-2017. In futsal, he earned his first call-up to the Australia national team in February 2016 ahead of the 2016 AFC Futsal Championship while playing for UTS Northside.
