= 2007 AFF Futsal Championship =

Tournament details
- Host country: Thailand
- City: Bangkok
- Dates: 26–31 March
- Teams: 8 (from 1 confederation)
- Venue: 1 (in 1 host city)

Final positions
- Champions: Thailand (5th title)
- Runners-up: Australia
- Third place: Malaysia
- Fourth place: Vietnam

Tournament statistics
- Matches played: 16
- Goals scored: 149 (9.31 per match)
- Best player: Prasert Innui

The 2007 AFF Futsal Championship was the fourth edition of the tournament. It took place from 26 to 31 March 2007 in Bangkok, Thailand.

== Group stage ==
- All times are Indochina Time (ICT) – UTC+07:00

=== Group A ===
| Team | Pld | W | D | L | GF | GA | GD | Pts |
|---|---|---|---|---|---|---|---|---|
| Australia | 3 | 3 | 0 | 0 | 13 | 6 | +7 | 9 |
| Malaysia | 3 | 1 | 1 | 1 | 16 | 8 | +8 | 4 |
| Indonesia | 3 | 1 | 1 | 1 | 6 | 7 | −1 | 4 |
| Philippines | 3 | 0 | 0 | 3 | 4 | 18 | −14 | 0 |

26 March 2007
12:00

| Philippines | 0 – 1 | Indonesia |

Hua Mark Indoor Stadium, Bangkok

26 March 2007
18:00

| Malaysia | 2 – 3 | Australia |

Hua Mark Indoor Stadium, Bangkok

27 March 2007
14:00

| Philippines | 3 – 12 | Malaysia |

Hua Mark Indoor Stadium, Bangkok

27 March 2007
16:00

| Australia | 5 – 3 | Indonesia |

Hua Mark Indoor Stadium, Bangkok

28 March 2007
12:00

| Australia | 5 – 1 | Philippines |

Hua Mark Indoor Stadium, Bangkok

28 March 2007
18:00

| Indonesia | 2 – 2 | Malaysia |

Hua Mark Indoor Stadium, Bangkok

=== Group B ===
| Team | Pld | W | D | L | GF | GA | GD | Pts |
|---|---|---|---|---|---|---|---|---|
| Thailand | 3 | 3 | 0 | 0 | 37 | 6 | +31 | 9 |
| Vietnam | 3 | 2 | 0 | 1 | 15 | 17 | −2 | 6 |
| Myanmar | 3 | 1 | 0 | 2 | 16 | 20 | −4 | 3 |
| Brunei | 3 | 0 | 0 | 3 | 4 | 29 | −25 | 0 |

26 March 2007
14:00

| Brunei | 3 – 10 | Myanmar |

Hua Mark Indoor Stadium, Bangkok

26 March 2007
16:00

| Vietnam | 3 – 13 | Thailand |

Hua Mark Indoor Stadium, Bangkok

27 March 2007
12:00

| Brunei | 0 – 6 | Vietnam |

Hua Mark Indoor Stadium, Bangkok

27 March 2007
18:00

| Thailand | 11 – 2 | Myanmar |

Hua Mark Indoor Stadium, Bangkok

28 March 2007
14:00

| Myanmar | 4 – 6 | Vietnam |

Hua Mark Indoor Stadium, Bangkok

28 March 2007
16:00

| Brunei | 1 – 13 | Thailand |

Hua Mark Indoor Stadium, Bangkok

== Knockout stage ==
- All times are Indochina Time (ICT) – UTC+07:00

=== Bracket ===
Semi-finals
30 March – Bangkok
Australia | 4
Vietnam | 1
30 March – Bangkok
Thailand | 13
Malaysia | 0

Final
31 March – Bangkok
Australia | 1
Thailand | 7
Third place
31 March – Bangkok
Vietnam | 6 (1)
Malaysia (p) | 6 (3)

=== Semi-finals ===
30 March 2007
16:00

| Australia | 4 – 1 | Vietnam |

Hua Mark Indoor Stadium, Bangkok
30 March 2007
18:00

| Thailand | 13 – 0 | Malaysia |

Hua Mark Indoor Stadium, Bangkok

=== Third place play-off ===
31 March 2007
16:00

| Vietnam | 6 – 6 | Malaysia |
Penalties
| | 1 – 3 |

Hua Mark Indoor Stadium, Bangkok

=== Final ===
31 March 2007
18:00

| Australia | 1 – 7 | Thailand |
|---|---|---|
| Simon 34' | | Khumthinkaew 11', 25'; Issarasuwipakorn 18'; Ekkapan Suratsawang 19'; Innui 19'; Janta 38'; Munjarern 39' |

Hua Mark Indoor Stadium, Bangkok

== Champions ==
2007 ASEAN Futsal Championship winners

Thailand
5th title
