= Cesario =

Cesario is both a surname and a given name. Notable people with the name include:

== Real people ==
=== As a surname ===
- Enzo Cesario (born 1980), Chilean track and road cyclist
- Jeff Cesario (born 1953), American comedian and writer
- Juliet Cesario (born 1966), American character actress

=== As a given name ===
- Cesario Azucena (1938–2021), Filipino lawyer
- Cesario Estrada Chavez (1927–1993), American labor leader and civil rights activist

== Fictional characters ==
- Cesario (Kiddy Grade), character in the anime series Kiddy Grade
- Cesario (Viola), character in the Shakespearean comedy Twelfth Night

== Other ==
- Cesario (horse), a Japanese Thoroughbred racehorse.
