= Robert Cañedo =

Filipino footballer

Personal information
- Date of birth: 31 August 1984 (age 42)
- Place of birth: Philippines
- Position: Left midfielder

Team information
- Current team: Green Archers United
- Number: 19

Youth career
- 2008–2011: West Negros University

Senior career*
Years	Team	Apps	(Gls)
2011–2013	Pachanga		
2013–2014	Loyola Meralco Sparks		
2014–	Green Archers United		

International career
2008	Philippines	3	(0)
- * Club domestic league appearances and goals

Robert Cañedo is a Filipino footballer who plays as a left midfielder for Green Archers United.

== Honours ==
=== Club ===
Loyola

- UFL Cup: 2013;
