= Nguyễn Bảo Quân =

Vietnamese footballer and coach

Personal information
- Full name: Nguyễn Bảo Quân
- Date of birth: 19 August 1983 (age 43)
- Place of birth: Hanoi, Vietnam
- Height: 1.75 m (5 ft 9 in)
- Position: Midfielder

Youth career
- 1993–1995: Thể Công

Senior career*
| Years | Team | Apps | (Gls) |
| 1996–2003 | Thể Công | 21 | (12) |
| 2003 | → Quân Khu 5 F.C | 1 | (5) |
| 2004–2009 | → Hanoi Dilmah Tea | 23 | (50) |
| 2009–2011 | Thái Sơn Bắc | 45 | (90) |
| 2011–2016 | Thái Sơn Nam | 60 | (90) |

International career^{‡}
| 2007–2016 | Vietnam | 100 | (50) |

Managerial career
- 2015–2018: Thái Sơn Nam
- 2020–: Cao Bằng Futsal Club
- * Club domestic league appearances and goals as of 5 July 2023, 15:26 (UTC) ‡ National team caps and goals as of 11 September 2023, 21:00 (UTC)

Nguyễn Bảo Quân (born 19 August 1983) is a former Vietnamese futsal player and now is the head coach Cao Bằng Futsal Club .

He played for Vietnam at 2016 FIFA Futsal World Cup.

As an occupation, he has been managing the Thái Sơn Nam and Vietnam national futsal team.
