= Australia men's national futsal team =

National sports team

Australia
- Shirt badge/Association crest
- Nickname(s): Futsalroos
- Association: Football Australia
- Confederation: AFC (Asia)
- Head coach: Miles Downie
- FIFA code: AUS
- FIFA ranking: 56 (24 September 2026)
| Home colours | Away colours |

First international
- United States 1–1 Australia (Amsterdam, Netherlands; 6 January 1989)

Biggest win
- Australia 23–1 Samoa (Port Vila, Vanuatu; 4 August 1996)

Biggest defeat
- Italy 13–1 Australia (Singapore, Singapore; 28 November 2001)

FIFA World Cup
- Appearances: 7 (First in 1989)
- Best result: Group Stage (7 times)

AFC Futsal Championship
- Appearances: 9 (First in 2006)
- Best result: Fourth place (2012)

AFF Futsal Championship
- Appearances: 7 (First in 2007)
- Best result: (silver) Runners-up (2007, 2013, 2014, 2015)

OFC Futsal Championship
- Appearances: 5 (First in 1992)
- Best result: Champions (1992, 1996, 1999, 2004, 2013)

The Australia national futsal team, nicknamed the Futsalroos, represents Australia in men's international futsal. The team is controlled by the governing body for soccer in Australia, Football Australia, which is currently a member of both the Asian Football Confederation (AFC) and the regional ASEAN Football Federation (AFF) since leaving the Oceania Football Confederation (OFC) in 2006.

Australia was a five-time OFC champion. The team has represented Australia at the FIFA Futsal World Cup tournaments on 7 occasions, but have never advanced beyond the group stage of the competition. After the 2016 FIFA Futsal World Cup, Football Australia decided not to continue investing and developing futsal in Australia. The F-League was disbanded in 2017, and Australia national futsal team is quickly becoming weaker than before.

== Coaching staff ==
| Head coach | (Australia) Miles Downie |
| Assistant coach | (Brazil) Bruno Cannavan |

== Players ==
For all past and present players who have appeared for the national team, see Australia national futsal team players.

=== Current squad ===
The following 14 players were named in the squad for the 2026 AFC Futsal Asian Cup qualification

.

| No. | Pos. | Player | DoB (Age) | Club |
|---|---|---|---|---|
| 1 | GK | Pok Man Yu | 17 October 1994 (age 31) | (Victoria (state)) Fitzroy Tigers |
| 12 | GK | Noah Feilich | 12 September 2002 (age 24) | (New South Wales) Eastern Suburbs Hakoah |
| 2 | | Tyler Garner | 8 October 2000 (age 26) | (Western Australia) Rockingham Cambio Cumbre |
| 3 | | Cosimo Russo | 8 March 1998 (age 28) | (Victoria (state)) Fitzroy Tigers |
| 4 | | Dominic Cox | 4 August 1996 (age 30) | (New South Wales) Enfield Allstars |
| 5 | | Jordan Guerreiro | 10 April 1995 (age 31) | (New South Wales) Mountain Majik |
| 6 | | Wade Giovenali | 15 August 1994 (age 32) | (New South Wales) Dural Warriors |
| 7 | | Scott Rogan | 29 August 1998 (age 28) | (Victoria (state)) Fitzroy Tigers |
| 8 | | Daniel Fornito | 3 October 1995 (age 31) | (New South Wales) Mascot Vipers |
| 9 | | Grant Lynch | 4 August 1993 (age 33) | (New South Wales) UTS Northside |
| 10 | | Ethan De Melo | 23 December 2002 (age 23) | (New South Wales) Mascot Vipers |
| 11 | | Corey Sewell | 9 August 1996 (age 30) | (Victoria (state)) Fitzroy Tigers |
| 13 | | Michael Kouta | 9 April 1997 (age 29) | (New South Wales) Enfield Allstars |
| 14 | | Jamie Dib | 14 August 1996 (age 30) | (New South Wales) Mountain Majik |

== Competitive record ==
=== FIFA Futsal World Cup ===
FIFA Futsal World Cup record
| Year | Result | Rank | M | W | D | L | GF | GA | GD |
|---|---|---|---|---|---|---|---|---|---|
| (Netherlands) 1989 | 1st round | 11th | 3 | 1 | 1 | 1 | 6 | 8 | -2 |
| (Hong Kong) 1992 | 1st round | 12th | 3 | 1 | 0 | 2 | 9 | 11 | -2 |
| (Spain) 1996 | 1st round | 15th | 3 | 0 | 0 | 3 | 4 | 26 | -22 |
| (Guatemala) 2000 | 1st round | 15th | 3 | 0 | 0 | 3 | 3 | 22 | -19 |
| (Chinese Taipei) 2004 | 1st round | 15th | 3 | 0 | 0 | 3 | 2 | 18 | -16 |
| (Brazil) 2008 | did not qualify | | | | | | | | |
| (Thailand) 2012 | Group stage | 20th | 3 | 1 | 0 | 2 | 5 | 17 | -12 |
| (Colombia) 2016 | Group stage | 18th | 3 | 1 | 0 | 2 | 5 | 16 | -11 |
| (Lithuania) 2020 | did not qualify | | | | | | | | |
| (Uzbekistan) 2024 | did not qualify | | | | | | | | |
| Total | 7/10 | 11th | 21 | 4 | 1 | 16 | 34 | 118 | -84 |

=== OFC Futsal Championship ===
OFC Futsal Championship record
| Year | Result | Rank | M | W | D | L | GF | GA | GD |
|---|---|---|---|---|---|---|---|---|---|
| (Australia) 1992 | Champion | 1st | 4 | 4 | 0 | 0 | 28 | 6 | +22 |
| (Vanuatu) 1996 | Champion | 1st | 6 | 6 | 0 | 0 | 69 | 8 | +61 |
| (Vanuatu) 1999 | Champion | 1st | 6 | 6 | 0 | 0 | 41 | 4 | +37 |
| (Australia) 2004 | Champion | 1st | 5 | 5 | 0 | 0 | 20 | 0 | +20 |
| 2008-2011 | Part of AFC | | | | | | | | |
| (New Zealand) 2013^ | Champion | 1st | 5 | 5 | 0 | 0 | 24 | 2 | +22 |
| 2014-2025 | Part of AFC | | | | | | | | |
| Total | 5/15 | 1st | 26 | 26 | 0 | 0 | 182 | 20 | +162 |

^Australia was no longer part of the OFC. They appeared as a guest nation.

=== AFC Futsal Asian Cup ===
| AFC Futsal Asian Cup record | | | | | | | | | | Qualification | | | | | | | |
| Year | Round | Rank | M | W | D | L | GF | GA | GD | M | W | D | L | GF | GA | GD | Link |
|---|---|---|---|---|---|---|---|---|---|---|---|---|---|---|---|---|---|
| 1999-2005 | Part of OFC | | | | | | | | | No qualification | | | | | | | |
| (Uzbekistan) 2006 | Group Stage | 7th | 3 | 2 | 0 | 1 | 14 | 13 | +12 | 3 | 3 | 0 | 0 | 24 | 8 | +16 | Link |
| (Japan) 2007 | Quarter Final | 8th | 4 | 1 | 1 | 2 | 6 | 13 | -7 | Automatically qualified | | | | | | | Link |
| (Thailand) 2008 | Quarter Final | 7th | 4 | 2 | 0 | 2 | 13 | 10 | +3 | Automatically qualified | | | | | | | Link |
| (Uzbekistan) 2010 | Quarter Final | 7th | 4 | 2 | 0 | 2 | 15 | 20 | -5 | 4 | 4 | 0 | 0 | 17 | 3 | +14 | Link |
| (United Arab Emirates) 2012 | Fourth place | 4th | 6 | 3 | 0 | 3 | 12 | 19 | +2 | 5 | 2 | 2 | 1 | 25 | 16 | +9 | Link |
| (Vietnam) 2014 | Quarter Final | 6th | 4 | 2 | 0 | 2 | 10 | 14 | -4 | 2013 AFF Futsal Championship | | | | | | | Link |
| (Uzbekistan) 2016 | Quarter Final | 5th | 6 | 4 | 0 | 2 | 17 | 16 | -1 | 2015 AFF Futsal Championship | | | | | | | Link |
| (Taiwan) 2018 | Withdrew | | | | | | | | | 2017 AFF Futsal Championship | | | | | | | Link |
| (Turkmenistan) 2020 | Did not qualify | | | | | | | | | 2019 AFF Futsal Championship | | | | | | | Link |
| (Kuwait) 2022 | Did not qualify | | | | | | | | | 2022 AFF Futsal Championship | | | | | | | Link |
| (Thailand) 2024 | Group Stage | 16th | 3 | 0 | 0 | 3 | 6 | 13 | -7 | 2 | 1 | 1 | 0 | 3 | 6 | -3 | Link |
| (Indonesia) 2026 | Group Stage | 13th | 3 | 0 | 1 | 2 | 5 | 11 | -6 | 3 | 2 | 1 | 0 | 20 | 4 | +16 | Link |
| Total:8/18 | Fourth place | 4th | 37 | 16 | 2 | 19 | 98 | 129 | -31 | 17 | 12 | 4 | 1 | 89 | 37 | +52 | _ |

=== ASEAN Futsal Championship ===
AFF Futsal Championship record
| Year | Result | Rank | Pld | W | D | L | GF | GA | GD |
|---|---|---|---|---|---|---|---|---|---|
| (Malaysia) 2001 | did not participate | | | | | | | | |
| (Malaysia) 2003 | did not participate | | | | | | | | |
| (Thailand) 2005 | did not participate | | | | | | | | |
| (Thailand) 2006 | did not participate | | | | | | | | |
| (Thailand) 2007 | Runners-up | 2nd | 5 | 4 | 0 | 1 | 15 | 14 | +1 |
| (Thailand) 2008 | did not participate | | | | | | | | |
| (Vietnam) 2009 | did not participate | | | | | | | | |
| (Vietnam) 2010 | did not participate | | | | | | | | |
| (Thailand) 2012 | did not participate | | | | | | | | |
| (Thailand) 2013 | Runners-up | 2nd | 6 | 5 | 0 | 1 | 42 | 7 | +35 |
| (Malaysia) 2014 | Runners-up | 2nd | 6 | 4 | 0 | 2 | 30 | 13 | +17 |
| (Thailand) 2015 | Runners-up | 2nd | 6 | 5 | 0 | 1 | 46 | 15 | +31 |
| (Thailand) 2016 | did not participate | | | | | | | | |
| (Vietnam) 2017 | Withdrew | | | | | | | | |
| (Indonesia) 2018 | did not participate | | | | | | | | |
| (Vietnam) 2019 | Group stage | 5th | 3 | 1 | 0 | 2 | 9 | 14 | -5 |
| (Thailand) 2022 | Group stage | 6th | 3 | 1 | 0 | 2 | 9 | 15 | -6 |
| (Thailand) 2024 | Fourth place | 4th | 5 | 1 | 1 | 3 | 17 | 17 | 0 |
| (Thailand) 2026 | Fourth place | 4th | 5 | 2 | 0 | 3 | 20 | 13 | +7 |
| Total | 8/19 | 2nd | 39 | 23 | 1 | 15 | 188 | 108 | +80 |

== Honours ==
- AFC Futsal Championship

Fourth place (1): 2012

- AFF Futsal Championship

Runners-up (4): 2007, 2013, 2014, 2015
Fourth place (1): 2024

- OFC Futsal Championship

Champions (5): 1992, 1996, 1999, 2004, 2013

== Other federations ==
In addition to the FA Futsal, an organisation known as the Federation of Australian Futsal (FAF) sends teams representing Australia to AMF world cups under the membership of the international body, Asociación Mundial de Futsal (AMF). The AMF organises the AMF Futsal World Cup.

=== AMF Futsal World Cup ===
AMF Futsal World Cup record
| Year | Result | Position | Pld | W | D | L | GF | GA |
|---|---|---|---|---|---|---|---|---|
| (Brazil) 1982 | did not participate | | | | | | | |
| (Spain) 1985 | 2nd round | 8th | ? | ? | ? | ? | ? | ? |
| (Australia) 1988 | 2nd round | 6th | 5 | 2 | 0 | 3 | 30 | 19 |
| (Italy) 1991 | 1st round | 11th | ? | ? | ? | ? | ? | ? |
| (Argentina) 1994 | did not participate | | | | | | | |
| (Mexico) 1997 | did not participate | | | | | | | |
| (Bolivia) 2000 | 1st round | 13th | 3 | 0 | 1 | 2 | 8 | 15 |
| (Paraguay) 2003 | 1st round | 19th | 3 | 0 | 0 | 3 | 5 | 29 |
| (Argentina) 2007 | did not participate | | | | | | | |
| (Colombia) 2011 | did not qualify | | | | | | | |
| (Belarus) 2015 | Group stage | 15th | 3 | 0 | 0 | 3 | 4 | 14 |
| (Argentina) 2019 | Group stage | 13th | ? | ? | ? | ? | ? | ? |
| Total | 7/12 | 0 Titles | 14 | 2 | 1 | 11 | 47 | 77 |

== See also ==
- Football Australia
- Australia national soccer team
- Australia women's national futsal team
