= Myanmar national futsal team =

National futsal team

Myanmar
- Nickname(s): Asean Lions
- Association: Myanmar Football Federation
- Confederation: AFC (Asia)
- Head coach: Pattaya Piamkum
- FIFA code: MYA
- FIFA ranking: 72 ▲1 (24 September 2026)
Home colours	Away colours

First international
- Brunei 2–7 Myanmar (Bangkok, Thailand, 3 May 2006)

Biggest win
- Myanmar 25–0 Philippines (Ho Chi Minh City, Vietnam; 28 October 2017)

Biggest defeat
- Myanmar 3–22 Thailand (Bangkok, Thailand, 4 May 2006)

AFC Futsal Championship
- Appearances: 2 (First in 2018)
- Best result: Group stage (2018, 2024)

AFF Futsal Championship
- Appearances: 15 (First in 2006)
- Best result: (silver) 2nd place (2016)

The Myanmar national futsal team is controlled by the Myanmar Football Federation, the governing body for futsal in Myanmar and represents the country in international futsal competitions.

== Tournaments ==
=== FIFA Futsal World Cup ===
FIFA World Cup Record
Year	Round	Pld	W	D*	L	GS	GA	Dif
(Netherlands) 1989	Did not enter							
(Hong Kong) 1992	Did not enter							
(Spain) 1996	Did not enter							
(Guatemala) 2000	Did not enter							
(Taiwan) 2004	Did not enter							
(Brazil) 2008	Did not enter							
(Thailand) 2012	Did not qualify							
(Colombia) 2016	Did not qualify							
(Lithuania) 2020	Did not qualify							
(Uzbekistan) 2024	Did not qualify							
Total	0/10	0	0	0	0	0	0	0

=== AFC Futsal Championship ===
Asian Championship record
Year	Round	Pld	W	D*	L	GS	GA	Dif
(Malaysia) 1999	Did not enter							
(Thailand) 2000	Did not enter							
(Iran) 2001	Did not enter							
(Indonesia) 2002	Did not enter							
(Iran) 2003	Did not enter							
(Macau) 2004	Did not enter							
(Vietnam) 2005	Did not enter							
(Uzbekistan) 2006	Did not enter							
(Japan) 2007	Did not enter							
(Thailand) 2008	Did not enter							
(Uzbekistan) 2010	Did not qualify							
(United Arab Emirates) 2012	Did not qualify							
(Vietnam) 2014	Did not qualify							
(Uzbekistan) 2016	Did not qualify							
(Taiwan) 2018	Group stage	3	0	0	3	5	22	−17
(Turkmenistan) 2020	Did not qualify							
(Kuwait) 2022	Did not qualify							
(Thailand) 2024	Group stage	3	1	1	1	4	7	−3
(Indonesia) 2026	Did not qualify							
Total	2/19	6	1	1	4	9	29	−20

=== ASEAN Futsal Championship ===
ASEAN Futsal Championship Record
Year	Round	Pld	W	D*	L	GS	GA	Dif
(Malaysia) 2001	Did not enter							
(Malaysia) 2003	Did not enter							
(Thailand) 2005	Did not enter							
(Thailand) 2006	Third place	4	2	0	2	23	31	−8
(Thailand) 2007	Group stage	3	1	0	2	16	20	−4
(Thailand) 2008	Group stage	3	1	0	2	10	13	−3
(Vietnam) 2009	Group stage	3	0	0	3	10	24	−14
(Vietnam) 2010	Group stage	4	0	0	4	7	22	−15
(Thailand) 2012	Group stage	4	1	0	3	11	19	−8
(Thailand) 2013	Group stage	4	2	0	2	19	10	+9
(Malaysia) 2014	Group stage	4	2	0	2	31	13	+18
(Thailand) 2015	Group stage	4	2	0	2	27	9	+18
(Thailand) 2016	Runners-up	5	4	0	1	26	18	+8
(Vietnam) 2017	Third place	6	3	1	2	46	15	+31
(Indonesia) 2018	Group stage	3	1	0	2	14	10	+4
(Vietnam) 2019	Fourth place	5	2	0	3	25	24	+1
(Thailand) 2022	Fourth place	5	2	2	1	19	12	+7
(Thailand) 2024	Group stage	3	1	1	1	9	12	–3
(Thailand) 2026	Group stage	3	0	0	3	1	9	–8
Total	16/19	63	24	4	35	294	261	+33

*Denotes draws include knockout matches decided on penalty kicks.
**Red border color indicates tournament was held on home soil.

== Honour ==
=== AFC competition ===
- AFC Futsal Asian Cup
  - Group stage (2): 2018, 2024

=== Regional ===
- AFF Futsal Championship
  - Runners-up (1): 2016
  - Third place (2): 2006, 2017

=== Invitation ===
- Jimo International Friendly Futsal Cup (China)
  - Third place (1): 2018
- CFA Futsal International Tournament
  - Third place (1): 2015

== Coaching staff ==
Position	Name
Head coach	(Thailand) Pattaya Piemkum
Assistant Coach	(Myanmar) (Myanmar)
Interpreter	(Myanmar)
Goalkeeper coach	(Myanmar)
Fitness Coach	(Myanmar)
Team Doctor	(Myanmar)
Physiotheropist	(Myanmar)

== Players ==
=== Current squad ===
The following players were named for 2018 AFC Futsal Championship.

No.	Pos.	Player	Date of birth (age)	Club
1	GK	Yan Paing Hein		(Myanmar Football Federation) MIC
2	GK	Zwe Pyae Sone	18 October 1994 (age 31)	
3	FP	Ko Ko Lwin	4 November 1996 (age 29)	
4	FP	Kaung Chit Thu	22 February 1991 (age 35)	
5	FP	Hein Min Soe	7 May 1990 (age 36)	(Myanmar Football Federation) MIC
6	FP	Naing Ye Kyaw	24 April 1993 (age 33)	(Myanmar Football Federation) MIC
7	FP	Myo Myint Soe	16 May 1991 (age 35)	(Myanmar Football Federation) Pyay United
8	FP	Sai Pyone Aung	27 November 1992 (age 33)	(Myanmar Football Federation) Pyay United
9	FP	Pyae Phyo Maung	15 November 1988 (age 37)	(Myanmar Football Federation) Pyay United
10	FP	Khin Zaw Lin	11 July 1993 (age 33)	
11	FP	Nyein Min Soe	19 May 1996 (age 30)	(Myanmar Football Federation) Pyay United
12	FP	Ye Lin Tun	16 September 1998 (age 28)	
13	FP	Aung Zin Oo	19 December 1993 (age 32)	(Myanmar Football Federation) Pyay United
14	FP	Pyae Phyo Maung	9 January 1992 (age 34)	

=== Previous squads ===
AFC Futsal Championship

- 2018 AFC Futsal Championship squads

== See also ==
- Myanmar national football team
- Myanmar national beach soccer team
- Myanmar women's national football team
