= 2014 AFC Futsal Championship qualification =

The 2014 AFC Futsal Championship qualification is held in late 2013 to determine 12 spots to the final tournament in Vietnam. The teams finishing first, second and third in the 2012 AFC Futsal Championship, and Vietnam, the host nation for the 2014 competition, receive automatic byes to the Finals.

== Format ==
Twenty-four teams registered in qualifying action for 12 places in the finals. Reigning champions Japan, runners-up Thailand, Iran and 2014 edition hosts Vietnam had direct entry into the tournament proper. The qualification process was divided into four zones: ASEAN Zone, which doubled as the 2013 AFF Futsal Championship, Central & South Zone, East Zone, and West Zone. The top three of each zone qualified for the 2014 AFC Futsal Championship.

== Qualified teams ==
Team	Qualified as	Qualification date	Appearance in finals
Thailand	2012 AFC Futsal Championship Runners-up	30 May 2012	13th
Japan	2012 AFC Futsal Championship Winners	30 May 2012	13th
Iran	2012 AFC Futsal Championship Third place	1 June 2012	13th
Vietnam	Host	31 August 2013	3rd
Chinese Taipei	East Group Runners-up	6 October 2013	10th
China	East Group Winners	6 October 2013	10th
South Korea	East Group Third place	7 October 2013	12th
Indonesia	ASEAN Group Fourth place	22 October 2013	9th
Australia	ASEAN Group Runners-up	22 October 2013	6th
Malaysia	ASEAN Group Fifth place	23 October 2013	10th
Uzbekistan	South & Central Group Winners	6 November 2013	13th
Tajikistan	South & Central Group Runners-up	7 November 2013	8th
Kyrgyzstan	South & Central Group Third place	7 November 2013	13th
Lebanon	West Group Winners	11 December 2013	9th
Kuwait	West Group Runners-up	11 December 2013	11th
Iraq	West Group Third place	12 December 2013	9th

== Zones ==
=== ASEAN ===
Matches played in Thailand from October 19 to October 27, 2013.
All times are Thailand Time – UTC+7.

==== Group stage ====
===== Group A =====
Team	Pld	W	D	L	GF	GA	GD	Pts
Thailand	4	4	0	0	36	4	+32	12
Vietnam	4	3	0	1	18	10	+8	9
Malaysia	4	2	0	2	26	10	+16	6
Philippines	4	1	0	3	9	50	−41	3
Brunei	4	0	0	4	10	25	−15	0

Source: AFF
19 October 2013
16:00

Malaysia	1–2	Vietnam
	Report

Bangkok Thonburi University, Bangkok
19 October 2013
19:00

Brunei	3–5	Philippines
	Report

Bangkok Thonburi University, Bangkok

20 October 2013
16:00

Philippines	1–20	Thailand
	Report

Bangkok Thonburi University, Bangkok
20 October 2013
19:00

Brunei	4–8	Malaysia
	Report

Bangkok Thonburi University, Bangkok

21 October 2013
16:00

Thailand	8–1	Brunei
	Report

Bangkok Thonburi University, Bangkok
21 October 2013
19:00

Vietnam	10–1	Philippines
	Report

Bangkok Thonburi University, Bangkok

22 October 2013
16:00

Brunei	2–4	Vietnam
	Report

Bangkok Thonburi University, Bangkok
22 October 2013
19:00

Malaysia	0–2	Thailand
	Report

Bangkok Thonburi University, Bangkok

23 October 2013
16:00

Philippines	2–17	Malaysia
	Report

Bangkok Thonburi University, Bangkok
23 October 2013
19:00

Vietnam	2–6	Thailand
	Report

Bangkok Thonburi University, Bangkok

===== Group B =====
Team	Pld	W	D	L	GF	GA	GD	Pts
Australia	4	4	0	0	36	4	+32	12
Indonesia	4	3	0	1	32	11	+21	9
Myanmar	4	2	0	2	19	10	+9	6
Timor-Leste	4	0	1	3	4	32	−28	1
Laos	4	0	1	3	3	37	−34	1

Source: AFF
19 October 2013
10:00

Myanmar	3–5	Indonesia
	Report

Bangkok Thonburi University, Bangkok
19 October 2013
13:00

Laos	2–2	Timor-Leste
	Report

Bangkok Thonburi University, Bangkok

20 October 2013
10:00

Timor-Leste	1–8	Australia
	Report

Bangkok Thonburi University, Bangkok
20 October 2013
13:00

Laos	1–6	Myanmar
	Report

Bangkok Thonburi University, Bangkok

21 October 2013
10:00

Australia	17–0	Laos
	Report

Bangkok Thonburi University, Bangkok
21 October 2013
13:00

Indonesia	12–1	Timor-Leste
	Report

Bangkok Thonburi University, Bangkok

22 October 2013
10:00

Laos	0–12	Indonesia
	Report

Bangkok Thonburi University, Bangkok
22 October 2013
13:00

Myanmar	0–4	Australia
	Report

Bangkok Thonburi University, Bangkok

23 October 2013
10:00

Timor-Leste	0–10	Myanmar
	Report

Bangkok Thonburi University, Bangkok
23 October 2013
13:00

Indonesia	3–7	Australia
	Report

Bangkok Thonburi University, Bangkok

==== Knockout stage ====
Semi-finals
October 25 – Bangkok
Thailand	10
Indonesia	4
October 25 – Bangkok
Australia	6
Vietnam	1

Final
October 27 – Bangkok
Thailand	2
Australia	1
Third place
October 27 – Bangkok
Indonesia	3
Vietnam	7

===== Semi-finals =====
25 October 2013
13:30

Thailand	10–4	Indonesia
Chudech 6'; Rattanawongsawa 11'; Thueanklang 13', 34', 36', 39', 39'; Sornwichian 15', 38'; Wongkaeo 28'	Report	Permana 16'; Ratana 26' (o.g.); Andriansyah 33'; Saptaji 35'

Chanchai Acadium
Bangkokthonburi University, Bangkok

25 October 2013
16:30

Australia	6–1	Vietnam
Fogarty 3', 35', 36' de Moraes 9'; Cooper 16'; Giovenali 19'	Report	Trần Hoàng Vinh 27'

Chanchai Acadium
Bangkokthonburi University, Bangkok

===== Third place play-off =====
27 October 2013
12:00

Indonesia	3–7	Vietnam
Ardy 16', 20'; Saptaji 38'	Report	Xuan Du 2', 12'; Khanh Hung 10', 30'; Trong Luan 35'; Van Vu 37'; Thanh Dat 39'

Chanchai Acadium
Bangkokthonburi University, Bangkok

===== Final =====
27 October 2013
15:00

Thailand	2–1	Australia
Suphawut 13', 36'	Report	Basger 40'

Chanchai Acadium
Bangkokthonburi University, Bangkok

=== East ===
All times are Vietnam Time – UTC+7.

Team	Pld	W	D	L	GF	GA	GD	Pts
China	4	3	1	0	18	2	+16	10
Chinese Taipei	4	3	1	0	14	8	+6	10
South Korea	4	2	0	2	19	10	+9	6
Hong Kong	4	1	0	3	10	23	−13	3
Macau	4	0	0	4	5	23	−18	0

3 October 2013
16:00

China	9–0	Macau
Deng Tao 1'; Geng Deyang 10', 12'; Zhang Wen 18', 26', 27'; Tan Guohui 23', 36'; Liu Chang 29'	Report

Phú Thọ Indoor Stadium, Ho Chi Minh City
Attendance: 300
Referee: Trương Quốc Dũng (Vietnam)

3 October 2013
19:00

Chinese Taipei	4–2	Hong Kong
Lo Chih-an 17'; Chi Sheng-fa 21', 38'; Tseng Ching-yao 33'	Report	So Sheung Kwai 6'; Chow Ka Wa 27'

Phú Thọ Indoor Stadium, Ho Chi Minh City
Attendance: 400
Referee: Yasukazu Nobumoto (Japan)

4 October 2013
16:00

Hong Kong	0–5	China
	Report	Tan Guohui 7'; Hu Jie 8'; Geng Deyang 10'; Xu Yang 16'; Liang Shuang 25'

Phú Thọ Indoor Stadium, Ho Chi Minh City
Attendance: 250
Referee: Scott Kidson (Australia)

4 October 2013
19:00

Macau	1–5	South Korea
Lei Ka Hou 9'	Report	Lee Min-yong 3'; Kim Min-kuk 7'; Shin Jong-hoon 16'; Kim Jang-goon 20'; Park Ha-nul 30'

Phú Thọ Indoor Stadium, Ho Chi Minh City
Attendance: 300
Referee: Rey Ritaga (Philippines)

5 October 2013
16:00

South Korea	3–5	Chinese Taipei
Shin Jong-hoon 20', 27', 32'	Report	Liu Chi-chao 14'; Lo Chih-an 17'; Tsai Hsien-tang 19'; Chi Sheng-fa 30', 38'

Phú Thọ Indoor Stadium, Ho Chi Minh City
Attendance: 300
Referee: Ryan Shepheard (Australia)

5 October 2013
19:00

Macau	3–6	Hong Kong
Kwok Siu Tin 13'; Cheang 19'; Kong Cheng Hou 36'	Report	So Sheung Kwai 13', 40'; Yeung Chi Lun 18', 37', 39'; Liu Yik Shing 28'

Phú Thọ Indoor Stadium, Ho Chi Minh City
Attendance: 250
Referee: Hiroyuki Kobayashi (Japan)

6 October 2013
16:00

Chinese Taipei	3–1	Macau
Chi Sheng-fa 3', 17'; Chen Chia-ho 21'	Report	Kong Cheng Hou 28'

Phú Thọ Indoor Stadium, Ho Chi Minh City
Attendance: 300
Referee: Samsudin Bin Ibrahim (Malaysia)

6 October 2013
19:00

South Korea	0–2	China
	Report	Li Xin 6'; Hu Jie 8'

Phú Thọ Indoor Stadium, Ho Chi Minh City
Attendance: 300
Referee: Scott Kidson (Australia)

7 October 2013
16:00

Hong Kong	2–11	South Korea
Lim Kyoung-hun 1' (o.g.); Chow Ka Wa 12'	Report	Lee Min-yong 1', 18'; Kim Min-kuk 2', 4', 16'; Lim Kyoung-hun 3'; Chow Ka Wa 6' (o.g.); Kim Ho-jin 7', 24'; Lee Ji-ho 29', 32'

Phú Thọ Indoor Stadium, Ho Chi Minh City
Attendance: 200
Referee: Trương Quốc Dũng (Vietnam)

7 October 2013
19:00

China	2–2	Chinese Taipei
Lu Yue 4'; Tan Guohui 17'	Report	Chen Chia-ho 16'; Chi Sheng-fa 40'

Phú Thọ Indoor Stadium, Ho Chi Minh City
Attendance: 300
Referee: Samsudin Bin Ibrahim (Malaysia)

=== South & Central ===
All times are Uzbekistan Time – UTC+5.

Team	Pld	W	D	L	GF	GA	GD	Pts
Uzbekistan	3	3	0	0	20	6	+14	9
Tajikistan	3	2	0	1	17	13	+4	6
Kyrgyzstan	3	0	1	2	7	15	−8	1
Turkmenistan	3	0	1	2	7	17	−10	1

5 November 2013
16:00

Kyrgyzstan	4–8	Tajikistan
Djetybaev 24', 36'; Kadyrov 30'; Sundeev 40'	Report	Ulmasov 11', 36'; Jumaev 15'; Makhmudov 16', 19', 37', 38', 40'

Uzbekistan Sports Complex, Tashkent
Attendance: 300
Referee: Alireza Sohrabi (Iran)

5 November 2013
19:00

Uzbekistan	10–1	Turkmenistan
Yunusov 1'; Rakhmatov 14', 14', 19', 26', 39'; Irsaliev 18'; Abdumavlyanov 32'; Sharipov 36', 38'	Report	Kervenov 25'

Uzbekistan Sports Complex, Tashkent
Attendance: 900
Referee: Zhang Youze (China)

6 November 2013
16:00

Turkmenistan	2–2	Kyrgyzstan
Atayev 25'; Rejepov 30'	Report	Baygazy Uulu 6'; Abdykadyrov 19'

Uzbekistan Sports Complex, Tashkent
Attendance: 100
Referee: Abdulrahman Abdulqader (Bahrain)

6 November 2013
19:00

Tajikistan	4–5	Uzbekistan
Jumaev 22'; Ulmasov 33'; Makhmudov 35', 39'	Report	Shohzukhurov 9' (o.g.); Rakhmatov 20'; Yunusov 22'; Irsaliev 22'; Elibaev 29'

Uzbekistan Sports Complex, Tashkent
Attendance: 1,200
Referee: Husein Khalaileh (Jordan)

7 November 2013
16:00

Tajikistan	5–4	Turkmenistan
Makhmudov 7', 13'; Jumaev 19', 28'; Mamedbabaev 27'	Report	Ashyrov 3'; Annaýew 4'; Mamedbabaev 5' (o.g.); Rejepov 27'

Uzbekistan Sports Complex, Tashkent
Attendance: 100
Referee: Liu Jianqiao (China)

7 November 2013
19:00

Uzbekistan	5–1	Kyrgyzstan
Irsaliev 7', 11'; Yunusov 8', 17'; Buriev 27'	Report	Chotbaev 37'

Uzbekistan Sports Complex, Tashkent
Attendance: 800
Referee: Hasan Mohammed (Iraq)

=== West ===
The matches will be played in Malaysia from December 8 to December 12, 2013.
All times are Malaysia Time – UTC+8.

Team	Pld	W	D	L	GF	GA	GD	Pts
Lebanon	4	3	1	0	13	9	+4	10
Kuwait	4	2	2	0	13	7	+6	8
Iraq	4	1	2	1	8	8	0	5
Qatar	4	0	2	2	5	10	−5	2
Saudi Arabia	4	0	1	3	10	15	−5	1

8 December 2013
15:30

Kuwait	6–3	Saudi Arabia
	Report

Nilai Indoor Stadium, Malaysia
8 December 2013
18:30

Lebanon	4–3	Iraq
	Report

Nilai Indoor Stadium, Malaysia

9 December 2013
15:30

Iraq	1–1	Kuwait
	Report

Nilai Indoor Stadium, Malaysia
9 December 2013
18:30

Saudi Arabia	2–2	Qatar
	Report

Nilai Indoor Stadium, Malaysia

10 December 2013
15:30

Qatar	1–3	Lebanon
	Report

Nilai Indoor Stadium, Malaysia
10 December 2013
18:30

Saudi Arabia	2–3	Iraq
	Report

Nilai Indoor Stadium, Malaysia

11 December 2013
15:30

Lebanon	4–3	Saudi Arabia
	Report

Nilai Indoor Stadium, Malaysia
11 December 2013
18:30

Qatar	1–4	Kuwait
	Report

Nilai Indoor Stadium, Malaysia

12 December 2013
15:30

Iraq	1–1	Qatar
	Report

Nilai Indoor Stadium, Malaysia
12 December 2013
18:30

Kuwait	2–2	Lebanon
	Report

Nilai Indoor Stadium, Malaysia
