= Timor-Leste national futsal team =

Timor-Leste
- Nickname(s): O Sol Nascente (The Rising Sun), The Little Samba Nation
- Association: Federação de Futebol de Timor-Leste
- Confederation: AFC (Asia)
- Head coach: Jorge Fernandes Da Silva
- Captain: Ivan Jerry B. Ferreira Alves
- FIFA code: TLS
- FIFA ranking: 101 (24 September 2026)
Home colours	Away colours

First international
- Portugal 56–0 Timor-Leste (Macau, China; 9 October 2006)

Biggest win
- Timor-Leste 8–0 Brunei (Manama, Bahrain; 11 November 2023)

Biggest defeat
- Brazil 76–0 Timor-Leste (Macau, China; 13 October 2006)

FIFA World Cup
- Appearances: None

AFC Futsal Championship
- Appearances: None

AFF Futsal Championship
- Appearances: 7 (First in 2009)
- Best result: 4th place (2016)

The Timor-Leste national futsal team is controlled by the Federação de Futebol de Timor-Leste, the governing body for futsal in East Timor (Timor-Leste) and represents the country in international futsal competitions.

== Competitions History ==
=== FIFA Futsal World Cup ===
World Cup Record
Year	Round	Pld	W	D*	L	GS	GA
(Netherlands) 1989	Did not enter						
(Hong Kong) 1992	Did not enter						
(Spain) 1996	Did not enter						
(Guatemala) 2000	Did not enter						
(Taiwan) 2004	Did not enter						
(Brazil) 2008	Did not enter						
(Thailand) 2012	Did not enter						
(Colombia) 2016	Did not qualify						
(Lithuania) 2020	Did not qualify						
(Uzbekistan) 2024	Did not qualify						
Total	0 titles	–	–	–	–	–	–

=== AFC Futsal Championship ===
Asian Championship record
Year	Round	GP	W	D	L	GF	GA
(Malaysia) 1999 to (United Arab Emirates) 2012	Did not participate						
(Vietnam) 2014	Did not qualify						
(Uzbekistan) 2016	Did not qualify						
(Taiwan) 2018	Did not enter						
(Kuwait) 2022	Did not qualify						
(Thailand) 2024	Did not qualify						
(Indonesia) 2026	Did not qualify						
Total	—	–	–	–	–	–	–

=== ASEAN Futsal Championship ===
AFF Futsal Championship record
Year	Round	GP	W	D	L	GF	GA
(Malaysia) 2001 to (Thailand) 2008	Did not participate						
(Vietnam) 2009	Group stage	2	0	0	2	3	31
(Vietnam) 2010	Did not participate						
(Thailand) 2012	Group stage	4	1	0	3	10	43
(Thailand) 2013	Group stage	4	0	1	3	4	32
(Malaysia) 2014	Group stage	4	1	0	3	7	35
(Thailand) 2015	Group stage	4	2	0	2	16	31
(Thailand) 2016	Fourth place	4	1	0	3	14	33
(Vietnam) 2017	Group stage	3	0	0	3	8	30
(Indonesia) 2018	Group stage	3	1	0	2	3	23
(Vietnam) 2019	Group stage	3	0	1	2	6	22
(Thailand) 2022	Group stage	3	0	0	3	8	24
(Thailand) 2024	Group stage	3	1	0	2	7	14
(Thailand) 2026	Group stage	3	1	0	2	5	12
Total	12/18	40	8	2	30	91	330

== Squad ==
=== Current squad ===
The following players were called up for the 2015 AFF Futsal Championship in Thailand during 8 – 16 October 2015.

Caps and goals updated as of 12 October 2015, after the match against Thailand.

No.	Pos.	Player	Date of birth (age)	Caps	Goals	Club
1	GK	Henrique		1	0	
2	FW	Pinto		2	0	
3	FW	Nelcen		3	0	
4	FP	Andre Vong		4	0	
5	FW	Machel		4	2	
6	FW	Remigio Duarte (vice-captain)		7	1	
7	FW	Lourenco B. Guterres		8	1	
8	FW	Manuel Sa Sarmento		4	8	
9	FW	Varela		16	10	
10	FW	Ivan (captain)		11	0	
12	GK	Stelyo Araujo		3	0	
13	FW	Nilton		4	0	
14	FP	Gil		4	0	
16	FP	José Vide	4 February 1987 (age 39)	4	4	
18	FW	Migi	4 July 1984 (age 42)	12	0	

=== International match records ===
Opponent	Pld	W	D	L	GF	GA	GD	Conf.
Angola	1	0	0	1	3	24	−21	CAF
Australia	3	0	0	3	5	24	−19	AFC
Bahrain	1	0	0	1	0	1	-1	AFC
Brazil	1	0	0	1	0	76	−76	CONMEBOL
Brunei	7	6	0	1	35	20	+15	AFC
Cambodia	1	0	1	0	4	4	0	AFC
China	1	0	0	1	1	20	−19	AFC
Indonesia	3	0	0	3	5	42	−37	AFC
Kuwait	2	1	0	1	4	8	-4	AFC
Kyrgyzstan	1	0	0	1	1	9	−8	AFC
Laos	3	1	1	1	10	11	−1	AFC
Macau	1	0	0	1	4	13	-9	AFC
Malaysia	4	0	0	4	7	28	−21	AFC
Myanmar	5	1	0	4	10	35	−25	AFC
Philippines	1	0	0	1	2	10	−8	AFC
Palestine	1	1	0	0	5	4	+1	AFC
Portugal	1	0	0	1	0	56	−56	UEFA
Qatar	1	0	0	1	1	19	−18	AFC
Singapore	1	1	0	0	6	3	+3	AFC
Tajikistan	1	0	0	1	1	22	−21	AFC
Thailand	7	0	0	7	9	88	−89	AFC
Vietnam	5	0	0	5	5	47	−42	AFC
Uzbekistan	1	0	0	1	1	7	−6	AFC
Total	46	10	2	38	112	558	−434	

== List of Coaches ==
Coach	Coaching period	Pld	W	D	L	Achievements
??	2009	2	0	0	2	2009 AFF Futsal Championship - Round 1 (First Time)
(Brazil) Jorge Fernandes Da Silva	2012-2014	12	2	1	9	2012 AFF Futsal Championship - Round 1; 2013 AFF Futsal Championship/2014 AFC Futsal Championship qualification - Round 1/DNQ (First Time); 2014 AFF Futsal Championship - Round 1
(Timor-Leste) Roni Rezo	2015	4	2	0	2	2015 AFF Futsal Championship/2016 AFC Futsal Championship qualification - Round 1/Did not qualify
Unknown	2016	4	1	0	3	2016 AFF Futsal Championship - Fourth place
(Portugal) Bruno Torres	2017-	3	0	0	3	2017 AFF Futsal Championship/2018 AFC Futsal Championship qualification - Round 1/Did not qualify
