= 2013 AFF Futsal Championship =

AFF Miracle of Life Futsal Championship 2013

Tournament details
- Host country: Thailand
- City: Bangkok
- Dates: 19–27 October
- Teams: 10 (from 1 confederation)
- Venue: 1 (in 1 host city)

Final positions
- Champions: Thailand (9th title)
- Runners-up: Australia
- Third place: Vietnam
- Fourth place: Indonesia

Tournament statistics
- Matches played: 24
- Goals scored: 227 (9.46 per match)
- Top scorer(s): (Thailand) Suphawut Thueanklang (14 goals)

The 2013 AFF Futsal Championship is the tenth edition of the tournament which was held in Bangkok, Thailand from 19 to 27 October 2013. Ten from twelve member nations of the ASEAN Football Federation (AFF) have entered all matches were played at the Chanchai Acadium in Bangkok Thonburi University. This edition also acted as a qualification tournament for the 2014 AFC Futsal Championship, with the top 3 teams (excluding Thailand and Vietnam who have qualified automatically as 2012 runners-up and 2014 host country, respectively) qualified for the 2014 AFC Futsal Championship.

== Venue ==
Chanchai Acadium
Capacity: 6,000 seating
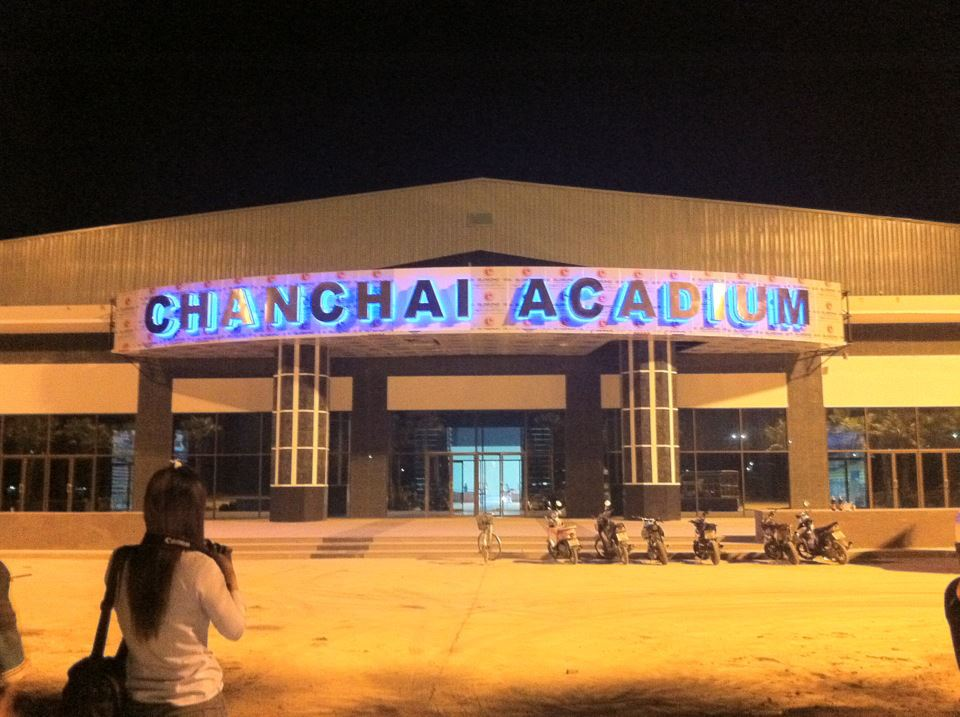

== Group stage ==
All times are Indochina Time (ICT) – UTC+7

=== Group A ===
| Team | Pld | W | D | L | GF | GA | GD | Pts |
|---|---|---|---|---|---|---|---|---|
| Thailand | 4 | 4 | 0 | 0 | 36 | 4 | +32 | 12 |
| Vietnam | 4 | 3 | 0 | 1 | 18 | 10 | +8 | 9 |
| Malaysia | 4 | 2 | 0 | 2 | 26 | 10 | +16 | 6 |
| Philippines | 4 | 1 | 0 | 3 | 9 | 50 | −41 | 3 |
| Brunei | 4 | 0 | 0 | 4 | 10 | 25 | −15 | 0 |

19 October 2013
16:00

| Vietnam | 2–1 | Malaysia |
|---|---|---|
| Thanh Dat 8'; Xuan Du 15' | Report | Pham Thanh Tuan 9' (o.g.) |

Chanchai Acadium
Bangkokthonburi University, Bangkok
19 October 2013
19:00

| Brunei | 3–5 | Philippines |
|---|---|---|
| Maidin 22', 38'; Eisa 36' | Report | Pasinabo 13'; Floriano 21', 26', 36'; Simpron 36' |

Chanchai Acadium
Bangkokthonburi University, Bangkok

20 October 2013
14:00

| Thailand | 20–1 | Philippines |
|---|---|---|
| Suphawut 3', 12', 22', 25', 33', 33'; Jirawat 4', 11', 30', 34'; Konghla 5', 24'; Atirach 9'; Nawin 16'; Kritsada 21', 23', 29', 30', 31', 33' | Report | Simpson 35' |

Chanchai Acadium
Bangkokthonburi University, Bangkok
20 October 2013
19:00

| Brunei | 4–8 | Malaysia |
|---|---|---|
| Fakhri Bangkul 20'; Maziri Maidin 34', 37', 39' | Report | Zubaidi Alwee 8'; Saiful Nizam 11', 20'; Qaiser Heshaam 20', 23'; Faisal Saharudin 26'; Muizuddin Haris 32'; Khairul Effendy 39' |

Chanchai Acadium
Bangkokthonburi University, Bangkok

21 October 2013
16:00

| Thailand | 8–1 | Brunei |
|---|---|---|
| Konghla 1'; Jetsada 7'; Kritsada 9', 30'; Suphawut 10'; Nawin 18'; Patchaya 18'; Jirawat 31' | Report | Muhammad Naqib 1' |

Chanchai Acadium
Bangkokthonburi University, Bangkok
21 October 2013
19:00

| Vietnam | 10–1 | Philippines |
|---|---|---|
| Bao Quan 4', 9'; Hoang Vinh 6'; Van Vu 12', 33'; Pham Thanh Tuan 16'; Quynh Toan 16', 34'; Tuan Vu 14', 37' | Report | unknown |

Chanchai Acadium
Bangkokthonburi University, Bangkok

22 October 2013
16:00

| Brunei | 2–4 | Vietnam |
|---|---|---|
| Muhammad Naqib 3'; Fakhri Bangkul 4' | Report | Bao Quan 10'; Troang Thien 15'; Hoang Vinh 18'; Trong Luan 19' |

Chanchai Acadium
Bangkokthonburi University, Bangkok
22 October 2013
19:00

| Malaysia | 0–2 | Thailand |
|---|---|---|
| | Report | Jetsada; Kritsada |

Chanchai Acadium
Bangkokthonburi University, Bangkok
Referee: Sopheak Saing (Cambodia)

23 October 2013
16:00

| Philippines | 2–17 | Malaysia |
|---|---|---|
| Floriano 25'; Simpron 36' | Report | Muhammad Shamsul 1', 19', 39'; Zubaidi Alwee 4'; Fawzul Hadzir 10', 13'; Muizzuddin Haris 16'; Abu Haniffa 20', 22', 32'; Fitri 26'; Saiful Nizam 27'; Mohamad Ali Mahat 29', 39'; Asmie Zahari |

Chanchai Acadium
Bangkokthonburi University, Bangkok
23 October 2013
19:00

| Thailand | 6–2 | Vietnam |
|---|---|---|
| Kritsada 9', 24', 28'; Jirawat 11', 28'; Chaiwat 40' | Report | Bao Quan 14'; Van Vu 17' |

Chanchai Acadium
Bangkokthonburi University, Bangkok

=== Group B ===
| Team | Pld | W | D | L | GF | GA | GD | Pts |
|---|---|---|---|---|---|---|---|---|
| Australia | 4 | 4 | 0 | 0 | 36 | 4 | +32 | 12 |
| Indonesia | 4 | 3 | 0 | 1 | 32 | 11 | +21 | 9 |
| Myanmar | 4 | 2 | 0 | 2 | 19 | 10 | +9 | 6 |
| Timor-Leste | 4 | 0 | 1 | 3 | 4 | 32 | −28 | 1 |
| Laos | 4 | 0 | 1 | 3 | 3 | 37 | −34 | 1 |

19 October 2013
10:00

| Myanmar | 3–5 | Indonesia |
|---|---|---|
| Pyae Phyo Maung 26'; Kyaw Tun 33'; Aung Aung 39' | Report | Saptaji 4', 11', 28'; Anza 23'; Kustiawan 24' |

Chanchai Acadium
Bangkokthonburi University, Bangkok
19 October 2013
13:00

| Laos | 2–2 | Timor-Leste |
|---|---|---|
| Samphaonong (??); Phanphendy 15' | Report | Jose 16'; Varela 33' |

Chanchai Acadium
Bangkokthonburi University, Bangkok

20 October 2013
10:00

| Timor-Leste | 1–8 | Australia |
|---|---|---|
| Jose 17' | Report | de Moraes 2'; Seeto 7', 19'; G.Giovenali 23', 24', 24'; W.Giovenali 29'; Lockhart 34' |

Chanchai Acadium
Bangkokthonburi University, Bangkok
20 October 2013
16:00

| Laos | 1–6 | Myanmar |
|---|---|---|
| Keomanixay 31' | Report | Aung Aung 7'; Htet Wai Lin 14'; Kyaw Tun 16'; Phasawaeng 30' (o.g.); Pyae Phyo Maung 33'; Naing Ye Kyaw 36' |

Chanchai Acadium
Bangkokthonburi University, Bangkok

21 October 2013
10:00

| Australia | 17–0 | Laos |
|---|---|---|
| Basger 3', 27'; Cooper 10', 12', 14', 15'; Musumeci 17', 35'; W.Giovenali 23'; Fogarty 25', 39', 40'; G.Giovenali 31'; Miller 33', 36'; Adeli 35'; Lockhart 38' | Report |

Chanchai Acadium
Bangkokthonburi University, Bangkok
21 October 2013
13:00

| Indonesia | 12–1 | Timor-Leste |
|---|---|---|
| Anza 1', 12', 12', 13', 32'; Saptaji 8'; Lubis 13'; Kustiawan 14', 22'; Nur Ali 25'; Agustin 37'; Suwardy 38' | Report | de Jesus 17' |

Chanchai Acadium
Bangkokthonburi University, Bangkok

22 October 2013
10:00

| Laos | 0–12 | Indonesia |
|---|---|---|
| | Report | Saptaji 1', 2', 10', 35'; Nur Ali 19'; Anza 26'; Agustin 29', 30'; Permana 38', 40'; Renaldi 40'; Hafid 40' |

Chanchai Acadium
Bangkokthonburi University, Bangkok
22 October 2013
13:00

| Myanmar | 0–4 | Australia |
|---|---|---|
| | Report | Adeli 8', 8'; Basger 12'; G.Giovenali 19' |

Chanchai Acadium
Bangkokthonburi University, Bangkok

23 October 2013
10:00

| Timor-Leste | 0–10 | Myanmar |
|---|---|---|
| | Report | Pyae Pyo Maung 5'; Kyaw Soe Moe 6', 16'; Naing Ye Kyaw 9', 32'; Pyae Pyo Maung II 10', 11'; Htew Win Lin 12', 24'; Aung Aung 26' |

Chanchai Acadium
Bangkokthonburi University, Bangkok
23 October 2013
13:00

| Indonesia | 3–7 | Australia |
|---|---|---|
| Kustiawan 2', 7', 40', (red card) 40'; Irawan (red card) 24' | Report | Seeto 1'; Basger 3', 36', 39'; G.Giovenali 4', 23'; Fogarty 19' |

Chanchai Acadium
Bangkokthonburi University, Bangkok
Referee: Hung Cuong Le (Vietnam)

== Knockout stage ==
Semi-finals
25 October – Bangkok
Thailand | 10
Indonesia | 4
25 October – Bangkok
Australia | 6
Vietnam | 1

Final
27 October – Bangkok
Thailand | 2
Australia | 1
Third place
27 October – Bangkok
Indonesia | 3
Vietnam | 7

=== Semi-finals ===
25 October 2013
13:30

| Thailand | 10 – 4 | Indonesia |
|---|---|---|
| Jetsada 6'; Nawin 11'; Suphawut 13', 34', 36', 39', 39'; Jirawat 15', 38'; Kritsada 28' | Report | Permana 12'; Rattana 26' (o.g.); Renaldi (red card) 28'; Agustin 33'; Saptaji 35' |

Chanchai Acadium
Bangkokthonburi University, Bangkok
25 October 2013
16:30

| Australia | 6 – 1 | Vietnam |
|---|---|---|
| Fogarty 3', 35', 36' de Moraes 9'; Cooper 16'; Giovenali 19' | Report | Trần Hoàng Vinh 27' |

Chanchai Acadium
Bangkokthonburi University, Bangkok

=== Third place play-off ===
27 October 2013
12:00

| Indonesia | 3 – 7 | Vietnam |
|---|---|---|
| Suwardy 16', 20'; Saptaji 38' | Report | Xuan Du 2', 12'; Khanh Hung 10', 30'; Trong Luan 35'; Van Vu 37'; Thanh Dat 39' |

Chanchai Acadium
Bangkokthonburi University, Bangkok

=== Final ===
27 October 2013
15:00

| Thailand | 2 – 1 | Australia |
|---|---|---|
| Suphawut 13', 36' | Report | Basger 40' |

Chanchai Acadium
Bangkokthonburi University, Bangkok

== Winner ==
2013 ASEAN Futsal Championship winners

Thailand
9th title

== Goalscorers ==
14 goals

- (Thailand) Suphawut Thueanklang

13 goals

- (Thailand) Kritsada Wongkaeo

10 goals

- (Indonesia) Bambang Bayu Saptaji

9 goals

- (Thailand) Jirawat Sornwichian

7 goals

- (Australia) Gregory Giovenali
- (Australia) Jarrod Basger
- (Indonesia) Anza Restuian Mas

6 goals

- (Indonesia) Andri Kustiawan

5 goals

- (Brunei) Maziri Maidin

4 goals

- (Australia) Adam Stuart Cooper
- (Australia) Daniel Fogarty
- (Indonesia) Andriansyah Agustin
- (Philippines) Pasilan Sevilla Floriano
- (Vietnam) Nguyen Bao Quan
- (Vietnam) Tran Van Vu

3 goals

- (Australia) Shervin Adeli
- (Australia) Tobias Seeto
- (Indonesia) Ardy Suwardy
- (Indonesia) Fhandy Permana
- (Malaysia) Abu Haniffa Hasan
- (Malaysia) Muhammad Shamsul Akmar Zamri
- (Malaysia) Saiful Nizam Mohd Ali
- (Myanmar) Aung Aung
- (Myanmar) Htet Wai Lin
- (Myanmar) Naing Ye Kyaw
- (Myanmar) Pyae Phyo Maung
- (Philippines) Jovanie Simpson
- (Thailand) Jetsada Chudech
- (Thailand) Kongla Lekkla
- (Thailand) Nawin Rattanawongsawad
- (Vietnam) Vu Xuan Du

2 goals

- (Australia) Dean Lockhart
- (Australia) Marino Musumeci
- (Australia) Raymond Miller
- (Australia) Wade Giovenali
- (Brunei) Fakhri Bangkul
- (Brunei) Muhammad Naqib Bin Pg. Timbang
- (Indonesia) Nur Ali
- (Indonesia) Renaldi
- (Malaysia) Ahmad Fawzul Hadzir Mohamad
- (Malaysia) Fitri
- (Malaysia) Mohamad Ali Mahat
- (Malaysia) Mohd Asmie Amir Zahari
- (Malaysia) Muizuddin Mohd Haris
- (Malaysia) Qaiser Heshaam Abdul Kadir
- (Malaysia) Zubaidi Alwee
- (Myanmar) Kyaw Kyaw Tun
- (Myanmar) Kyaw Soe Moe
- (Myanmar) Pyae Phyo Maung II
- (Timor-Leste) Jose Gusmao Carvalho Vong
- (Vietnam) Hoang Tuan Vu
- (Vietnam) Luu Quynh Toan
- (Vietnam) Ly Khanh Hung
- (Vietnam) Pham Thanh Dat
- (Vietnam) Phung Trong Luan
- (Vietnam) Tran Hoang Vinh

1 goals

- (Australia) Fernando de Moraes
- (Brunei) Mohamad Arif Haji Eisa
- (Indonesia) Julinur Hafid
- (Indonesia) Syahidansyah
- (Laos) Inpan Keomanixay
- (Laos) Somphone Samphaonong
- (Laos) Souk Ananh Phanphendy
- (Malaysia) Mohd Faisal Saharudin
- (Malaysia) Mohd Khairul Effendy Mohd Bahrin
- (Philippines) Arnie Pasanibo
- (Thailand) Athirach Sittisak
- (Thailand) Chaiwat Jamgrajang
- (Thailand) Patchaya Srimanta
- (Timor-Leste) Manuel Varela Pereira
- (Timor-Leste) Moises de Jesus
- (Vietnam) Nguyen Troang Thien
- (Vietnam) Pham Thanh Tuan
- (Vietnam) Phung Trong Luan

=== Owngoal ===
1 owngoals

- (Laos) Soulichanh Phasawaeng (for Myanmar)
- (Vietnam) Pham Thanh Tuan (for Malaysia)
- (Thailand) Piyapan Rattana (for Indonesia)

== Team statistics ==
This table will show the ranking of teams throughout the tournament.

| Pos | Team | Pld | W | D | L | GF | GA | GD |
Ranking stage
| 1 | Thailand | 6 | 6 | 0 | 0 | 48 | 9 | +39 |
| 2 | Australia | 6 | 5 | 0 | 1 | 43 | 7 | +36 |
| 3 | Vietnam | 6 | 4 | 0 | 2 | 26 | 19 | +7 |
| 4 | Indonesia | 6 | 3 | 0 | 3 | 39 | 28 | +11 |
| 5 | Malaysia | 4 | 2 | 0 | 2 | 26 | 10 | +17 |
| 6 | Myanmar | 4 | 2 | 0 | 2 | 19 | 10 | +9 |
| 7 | Philippines | 4 | 1 | 0 | 3 | 9 | 50 | –51 |
| 8 | Timor-Leste | 4 | 0 | 1 | 3 | 4 | 32 | –28 |
| 9 | Laos | 4 | 0 | 1 | 3 | 3 | 37 | –34 |
| 10 | Brunei | 4 | 0 | 0 | 4 | 10 | 25 | -15 |
