= 2015 AFF Futsal Championship =

Tournament details
- Host country: Thailand
- City: Bangkok
- Dates: 8–16 October
- Teams: 10 (from 1 confederation)
- Venue: 1 (in 1 host city)

Final positions
- Champions: Thailand (11th title)
- Runners-up: Australia
- Third place: Malaysia
- Fourth place: Vietnam

Tournament statistics
- Matches played: 24
- Goals scored: 251 (10.46 per match)
- Attendance: 61,800 (2,575 per match)
- Top scorer(s): (Australia) Daniel Fogarty (Thailand) Jetsada Chudech (each 12 goals)

The 2015 AFF Futsal Championship was the 12th edition of the tournament which was held in Thailand from 8 to 16 October 2015. This edition will also act as a qualification tournament for the 2016 AFC Futsal Championship.

A statement in June stated that Thailand and Australia were already assured of qualification to the 2016 AFC Championship, due to their positioning in the previous (2014) edition. This was later modified back so that those who reach the semi-finals shall qualify.

Singapore participated at the tournament after a 13-year absence, last participating at the inaugural edition in 2001.

== Teams ==
The tournament was originally set to be hosted by Indonesia but the country's national football association was suspended by FIFA, barring the country from both hosting and participating in the tournament.

The following groups were drawn at the 15th AFF Council meeting in Singapore on 16 June 2015.

Pot A	Pot B
Thailand (host); Timor-Leste; Brunei; Malaysia; Singapore	Australia; Vietnam; Laos; Myanmar; Philippines

== Venue ==
Bangkok
Bangkok Arena	Location of stadiums of the 2015 AFF Futsal Championship.
Capacity: 12,000	Location of stadiums of the 2015 AFF Futsal Championship.

== Group stage ==
Times listed are UTC+7.

=== Group A ===
Pos	Team	Pld	W	D	L	GF	GA	GD	Pts	Qualification
1	Thailand (H)	4	4	0	0	42	5	+37	12	Knockout stage and 2016 AFC Futsal Championship
2	Malaysia	4	3	0	1	22	9	+13	9	Knockout stage and 2016 AFC Futsal Championship
3	Timor-Leste	4	2	0	2	16	31	−15	6	
4	Brunei	4	1	0	3	10	28	−18	3	
5	Singapore	4	0	0	4	4	21	−17	0	

Source: AFC & AFF
Rules for classification: Qualification tiebreakers
(H) Hosts
8 October 2015
16:30

Timor-Leste	6–3	Singapore
Sarmento 8', 23', 24', 28'; Machel 31'; José Vide 39'	Report AFC; Report Asean	Amir 2', 18'; Helmi 22'

Bangkok Arena, Bangkok
Attendance: 200
Referee: Hiroyuki Kobayashi (Japan)
8 October 2015
19:00

Brunei	1–9	Malaysia
Faizul 9'	Report AFC; Report Asean	Fawzul 1', 12', 25', 25'; Yamin 6' (o.g.); Fitri 11'; Aizad 26'; Akmarulnizam 28' (pen.); Nizam 30'

Bangkok Arena, Bangkok
Attendance: 400
Referee: Ali Reza Sohrabi Balsini (Iran)

9 October 2015
16:30

Timor-Leste	6–5	Brunei
Guterres 12'; Sarmento 15', 24', 30'; José Vide 25', 37'	Report AFC; Report Asean	Azizan 2'; Faiz 28', 34'; Faizul 30', 36'

Bangkok Arena, Bangkok
Attendance: 3,000
Referee: Vahid Arzpeyma Mohamareh (Iran)
9 October 2015
19:00

Singapore	0–8	Thailand
	Report AFC; Report Asean	Jetsada 1', 26'; Suphawut 5'; Kritsada 8', 19', 35'; Piyapan 34'; Nattawut 38'

Bangkok Arena, Bangkok
Attendance: 6,000
Referee: Hawkar Salar Ahmed (Iraq)

10 October 2015
16:30

Singapore	1–2	Brunei
Farhan 12'	Report AFC; Report Asean	Faiz 23', 37'

Bangkok Arena, Bangkok
Attendance: 700
Referee: Husein Mahmoud Khalaileh (Jordan)
10 October 2015
19:00

Thailand	6–1	Malaysia
Piyapan 10'; Jetsada 13'; Chaiwat 15'; Sorasak 23'; Nattawut 36'; Kritsada 37'	Report AFC; Report Asean	Khairul Effendy 39'

Bangkok Arena, Bangkok
Attendance: 5,500
Referee: Hasan Mohammed Al-Gburi (Iraq)

11 October 2015
16:30

Malaysia	7–2	Timor-Leste
Akmarulnizam 1'; Fitri 12', 22'; Ivan 17' (o.g.); Nizam 34'; Aula 37'; Fawzul 39'	Report AFC; Report Asean	Machel 18'; Remigio Duarte 22'

Bangkok Arena, Bangkok
Attendance: 1,500
Referee: Khamis Hassan Alshamsi (United Arab Emirates)
11 October 2015
19:00

Brunei	2–12	Thailand
Maziri 26'; Azizan 38'	Report AFC; Report Asean	Kritsada 1'; Konghla 5'; Jetsada 8', 15', 16', 39'; Ampol 10'; Suphawut 14', 25', 35'; Jirawat 29'; Sorasak 39'

Bangkok Arena, Bangkok
Attendance: 5,000
Referee: Tomohiro Kozaki (Japan)

12 October 2015
16:30

Singapore	0–5	Malaysia
	Report AFC; Report Asean	Yazadh 9'; Aizad 22'; Aula 38'; Yi Long 38' (o.g.); Fawzul 40'

Bangkok Arena, Bangkok
Attendance: 500
Referee: Hiroyuki Kobayashi (Japan)
12 October 2015
19:00

Thailand	16–2	Timor-Leste
Sorasak 4'; Jetsada 5', 5', 37', 40'; Suphawut 18', 29', 34', 35'; Wanlop 20', 40', 40'; Warut 22', 33'; Piyanat 27'; Nattawut 37'	Report AFC; Report Asean	Sarmento 15'; José Vide 19'

Bangkok Arena, Bangkok
Attendance: 4,000
Referee: Vahid Arzpeyma Mohamareh (Iran)

=== Group B ===
Pos	Team	Pld	W	D	L	GF	GA	GD	Pts	Qualification
1	Australia	4	4	0	0	37	8	+29	12	Knockout stage and 2016 AFC Futsal Championship
2	Vietnam	4	3	0	1	39	9	+30	9	Knockout stage and 2016 AFC Futsal Championship
3	Myanmar	4	2	0	2	27	9	+18	6	
4	Laos	4	1	0	3	17	43	−26	3	
5	Philippines	4	0	0	4	4	55	−51	0	

Source: AFC & AFF
Rules for classification: Qualification tiebreakers
8 October 2015
11:30

Laos	1–13	Vietnam
Oley 7'	Report AFC; Report Asean	Lê Quốc Nam 3'; Mai Thành Đạt 8', 32'; Trần Long Vũ 9', 38'; Phùng Trọng Luân 9', 35'; Nguyễn Minh Trí 11'; Nguyễn Bảo Quân 11'; Ngô Ngọc Sơn 14'; Danh Phát 19'; Trần Văn Vũ 23'; Dương Anh Tùng 38'

Bangkok Arena, Bangkok
Attendance: 200
Referee: Liu Jianqiao (China)
8 October 2015
14:00

Philippines	0–13	Myanmar
	Report AFC; Report Asean	Nyein Min Soe 3'; Kyaw Soe Moe 10', 12'; Naing Ye Kyaw 11', 22', 25'; Htet Myat Naing 13', 30'; Pyae Phyo Maung 17'; Aung Zin Oo 18'; Pyae Phyo Maung 33'; Ye Yint Oo 36'; Khin Zaw Lin 37'

Bangkok Arena, Bangkok
Attendance: 250
Referee: Khamis Hassan Alshamsi (United Arab Emirates)

9 October 2015
11:30

Myanmar	1–3	Australia
Khin Zaw Lin 22'	Report AFC; Report Asean	Fogarty 10'; W. Giovenali 14', 15'

Bangkok Arena, Bangkok
Attendance: 150
Referee: Lee Po-fu (Chinese Taipei)
9 October 2015
14:00

Philippines	3–10	Laos
Pasilan 16', 36'; Mabanag 37'	Report AFC; Report Asean	Champathong 6'; Phasawaeng 6', 36'; Keomanixay 9', 24'; Phiphakkhavong 16', 16', 31'; Nonmany 18'; Chanchaleune 25'

Bangkok Arena, Bangkok
Attendance: 300
Referee: Abdulrahman Abdulqader Abdulla (Bahrain)

10 October 2015
11:30

Australia	13–0	Philippines
Niski 6', 7', 23'; Basger 13', 35'; Lockhart 15', 16', 24'; W. Giovenali 19'; Cooper 19', 29'; Adeli 30'; Seeto 37'	Report AFC; Report Asean

Bangkok Arena, Bangkok
Attendance: 100
Referee: Tomohiro Kozaki (Japan)
10 October 2015
14:00

Vietnam	2–1	Myanmar
Trần Văn Vũ 9', 28'	Report AFC; Report Asean	Pyae Phyo Maung 24'

Bangkok Arena, Bangkok
Attendance: 300
Referee: Zhang Youze (China)

11 October 2015
11:30

Philippines	1–19	Vietnam
Hermosa 25'	Report AFC; Report Asean	Phạm Đức Hòa 7', 17', 25'; Dương Anh Tùng 11'; Lê Quốc Nam 21', 27'; Nguyễn Minh Trí 21', 31'; Nguyễn Bảo Quân 21', 31', 32'; Yuhico 23' (o.g.); Ngô Ngọc Sơn 27'; Vũ Xuân Du 28', 30'; Trần Văn Vũ 34'; Trần Long Vũ 36'; Phùng Trọng Luân 36'; Danh Phát 40'

Bangkok Arena, Bangkok
Attendance: 100
Referee: Liu Jianqiao (China)
11 October 2015
14:00

Laos	2–15	Australia
Keomanixay 29'; Phasawaeng 39'	Report AFC; Report Asean	Adeli 1', 13'; Fogarty 3', 23', 23', 40'; Basger 6', 12', 13'; G. Giovenali 16', 30'; Kelshaw 28', 29'; Lockhart 36', 37'

Bangkok Arena, Bangkok
Attendance: 250
Referee: Lee Po-fu (Chinese Taipei)

12 October 2015
11:30

Myanmar	12–4	Laos
Nyein Min Soe 6', 37'; Htet Myat Naing 15', 22', 34'; Aung Aung 16', 17', 23'; Khin Zaw Lin 18'; Pyae Phyo Maung 25'; Sinthapaseuth 26' (o.g.); Bunliyong 39' (o.g.)	Report AFC; Report Asean	Chanchaleune 12'; Phommaxay 35'; Phiphakkhavong 38'; Souksabai 39'

Bangkok Arena, Bangkok
Attendance: 50
Referee: Hawkar Salar Ahmed (Iraq)
12 October 2015
14:00

Vietnam	5–6	Australia
Lê Quốc Nam 14'; Nguyễn Minh Trí 17'; Trần Văn Vũ 22'; Ngô Ngọc Sơn 27'; Dương Anh Tùng 28'	Report AFC; Report Asean	Fogarty 13', 15', 18', 23'; Basger 16'; Lockhart 27'

Bangkok Arena, Bangkok
Attendance: 300
Referee: Hasan Mohammed Al-Gburi (Iraq)

== Knockout stage ==
Semi-finals
14 October – Bangkok
Thailand	6
Vietnam	0
14 October – Bangkok
Australia	6
Malaysia	2

Final
16 October – Bangkok
Thailand	5
Australia	3
Third place match
16 October – Bangkok
Vietnam	5
Malaysia	6

=== Semi-finals ===
14 October 2015
16:00

Thailand	6–0	Vietnam
Jirawat 29'; Nattawut 30'; Suphawut 32', 38', 39'; Jetsada 39'	Report AFC; Report Asean

Bangkok Arena, Bangkok
Attendance: 10,000
Referee: Tomohiro Kozaki (Japan)
14 October 2015
19:00

Australia	6–2	Malaysia
Niski 9'; Fogarty 10', 13'; Cooper 28', 32'; Basger 36'	Report AFC; Report Asean	Yazadh 21'; Nizam 37'

Bangkok Arena, Bangkok
Attendance: 3,000
Referee: Ali Reza Sohrabi Balsini (Iran)

=== Third place match ===
16 October 2015
16:00

Vietnam	5–6	Malaysia
Dương Anh Tùng 4'; Vũ Xuân Du 11'; Trần Văn Vũ 13'; Lê Quốc Nam 21'; Ngô Ngọc Sơn 30'	Report AFC; Report Asean	Khairul Effendy 12'; Fitri 14'; Nizam 18', 32', 39'; Fawzul 34'

Bangkok Arena, Bangkok
Attendance: 10,000
Referee: Liu Jianqiao (China)

=== Final ===
16 October 2015
19:00

Thailand	5–3	Australia
Kritsada 29', 29', 40'; Sorasak 34'; Warut 35'	Report AFC; Report Asean	Basger 22'; Barrientos 36'; Fogarty 39'

Bangkok Arena, Bangkok
Attendance: 10,000
Referee: Hawkar Salar Ahmed (Iraq)

== Winner ==
2015 ASEAN Futsal Championship winners

Thailand
11th title

== Goalscorers ==
12 goals

- (Australia) Daniel Fogarty
- (Thailand) Jetsada Chudech

11 goals

- (Thailand) Suphawut Thueanklang

8 goals

- (Australia) Jarrod Basger
- (Thailand) Kritsada Wongkaeo
- (Timor-Leste) Manuel Sa Sarmento

7 goals

- (Malaysia) Ahmad Fawzul Hadzir Mohamad

6 goals

- (Australia) Dean Lockhart
- (Malaysia) Saiful Nizam Mohd Ali
- (Vietnam) Trần Văn Vũ

5 goals

- (Myanmar) Htet Myat Naing
- (Vietnam) Lê Quốc Nam

4 goals

- (Australia) Adam Cooper
- (Australia) Nathan Niski
- (Brunei) Faiz Hasnan
- (Laos) Khampha Phiphakkhavong
- (Malaysia) Muhamad Fitri Yatim
- (Thailand) Nattawut Madyalan
- (Thailand) Sorasak Phoonjungreed
- (Timor-Leste) José Vide
- (Vietnam) Dương Anh Tùng
- (Vietnam) Ngô Ngọc Sơn
- (Vietnam) Nguyễn Bảo Quân
- (Vietnam) Nguyễn Minh Trí

3 goals

- (Australia) Shervin Keshavarz Adeli
- (Australia) Wade Giovenali
- (Brunei) Faizul Jefry Zaini
- (Laos) Inpan Keomanixay
- (Laos) Soulichanh Phasawaeng
- (Myanmar) Aung Aung
- (Myanmar) Khin Zaw Lin
- (Myanmar) Naing Ye Kyaw
- (Myanmar) Nyein Min Soe
- (Myanmar) Pyae Phyo Maung
- (Thailand) Wanlop Pansomsuay
- (Thailand) Warut Wangsama-Aeo
- (Vietnam) Phạm Đức Hòa
- (Vietnam) Phùng Trọng Luân
- (Vietnam) Trần Long Vũ
- (Vietnam) Vũ Xuân Du

2 goals

- (Australia) Glen Kelshaw
- (Australia) Gregory Giovenali
- (Brunei) Azizan Roslan
- (Laos) Nidnilanh Chanchaleune
- (Malaysia) Aizad Daniel
- (Malaysia) Akmarulnizam Idris
- (Malaysia) Mohd Khairul Effendy Mohd Bahrin
- (Malaysia) Muhammad Akmal Yazadh Amri
- (Malaysia) Saiful Aula Ahmad
- (Myanmar) Kyaw Soe Moe
- (Philippines) Pasilan Floriano Jr Sevilla
- (Singapore) Amir Zalani
- (Thailand) Jirawat Sornwichian
- (Thailand) Piyapan Rattana
- (Timor-Leste) Machel Antonio Fernandes Alves Carvalho
- (Vietnam) Danh Phát
- (Vietnam) Mai Thành Đạt

1 goal

- (Australia) Jonathan Barrientos
- (Australia) Tobias Seeto
- (Brunei) Maziri Maidin
- (Laos) Chiu Nonmany
- (Laos) Khitsakhone Champathong
- (Laos) Khounsombath Phommaxay
- (Laos) Kita Souksabai
- (Laos) Oley Bousa Ath
- (Myanmar) Aung Zin Oo
- (Myanmar) Pyae Phyo Maung
- (Myanmar) Ye Yint Oo
- (Philippines) Mabanag Michael Jerremy
- (Philippines) Lorenzo Hermosa
- (Singapore) Mohamed Farhan Farook
- (Singapore) Mohamad Helmi
- (Thailand) Ampol Srirageaw
- (Thailand) Chaiwat Jamgrajang
- (Thailand) Konghla Lekka
- (Thailand) Piyanat Nusaya
- (Timor-Leste) Lourenco B. Guterres
- (Timor-Leste) Remigio Duarte Lopes da Silva

1 own goal

- (Brunei) Yamin Haji Muhammad (playing against Malaysia)
- (Laos) Panida Sinthapaseuth (playing against Myanmar)
- (Laos) Suvannahong Bunliyong (playing against Myanmar)
- (Philippines) Manuel Yuhico (playing against Vietnam)
- (Singapore) Yi Long (playing against Malaysia)
- (Timor-Leste) Ivan Alves (playing against Malaysia)

== Teams qualified ==
Per statistical convention in football, matches decided in extra time are counted as wins and losses, while matches decided by penalty shoot-out are counted as draws.

Pos	Grp	Team	Pld	W	D	L	GF	GA	GD	Pts	Qualification
1	A	Thailand (H)	6	6	0	0	53	8	+45	18	Champions and 2016 AFC Futsal Championship
2	B	Australia	6	5	0	1	46	15	+31	15	Runners-up and 2016 AFC Futsal Championship
3	A	Malaysia	6	4	0	2	30	2	+28	12	Third place and 2016 AFC Futsal Championship
4	B	Vietnam	6	3	0	3	44	21	+23	9	Fourth place and 2016 AFC Futsal Championship
5	B	Myanmar	4	2	0	2	27	9	+18	6	Eliminated in Group stage
6	A	Timor-Leste	4	2	0	2	16	31	−15	6	Eliminated in Group stage
7	A	Brunei	4	1	0	3	10	28	−18	3	Eliminated in Group stage
8	B	Laos	4	1	0	3	17	43	−26	3	Eliminated in Group stage
9	A	Singapore	4	0	0	4	4	21	−17	0	Eliminated in Group stage
10	B	Philippines	4	0	0	4	4	55	−51	0	Eliminated in Group stage

Source: AFC & AFF
(H) Hosts
