= Trần Văn Vũ (futsal player) =

Vietnamese futsal player

Personal information
- Full name: Trần Văn Vũ
- Date of birth: 30 May 1990 (age 36)
- Place of birth: Đồng Xoài, Bình Phước, Vietnam
- Height: 1.83 m (6 ft 0 in)
- Position: Defender

Team information
- Current team: Thái Sơn Nam
- Number: 11

Senior career*
Years	Team	Apps	(Gls)
2008–2023	Thái Sơn Nam	138	(9)
2019	O Parrulo FS (loan)	5	(0)

International career
2009–2023	Vietnam	78	(43)

Managerial career
- 2024–: Thái Sơn Nam (assistant)
- 2024–: Vietnam Women (assistant)
- * Club domestic league appearances and goals

Trần Văn Vũ (born 30 May 1990) is a former Vietnamese futsal player who plays as a defender (fixo) for Thái Sơn Nam.

== International career ==
=== International goals ===
Trần Văn Vũ's international goals
1.	21 April 2012	Bangkok University, Bangkok, Thailand	Myanmar	3–0	3–0	2012 AFF Futsal Championship
2.	27 April 2012	Bangkok University, Bangkok, Thailand	Thailand	2–5	4–9	2012 AFF Futsal Championship
3.	26 June 2013	Dongbu Students Gymnasium, Incheon, South Korea	Palestine	1–0	4–1	Futsal at the 2013 Asian Indoor and Martial Arts Games
4.	26 June 2013	Dongbu Students Gymnasium, Incheon, South Korea	Palestine	2–0	4–1	Futsal at the 2013 Asian Indoor and Martial Arts Games
5.	21 October 2013	Bangkok University, Bangkok, Thailand	Philippines	4–?	10–1	2013 AFF Futsal Championship
6.	21 October 2013	Bangkok University, Bangkok, Thailand	Philippines	8–?	10–1	2013 AFF Futsal Championship
7.	23 October 2013	Bangkok University, Bangkok, Thailand	Thailand	2–2	2–6	2013 AFF Futsal Championship
8.	27 October 2013	Bangkok University, Bangkok, Thailand	Indonesia	6–2	7–3	2013 AFF Futsal Championship
9.	20 November 2013	Phu Tho Gymnasium, Ho Chi Minh City, Vietnam	Japan	1–2	1–2	Friendly
10.	22 November 2013	Phu Tho Gymnasium, Ho Chi Minh City, Vietnam	Brazil	2–2	3–2	Friendly
11.	13 December 2013	Wunna Theikdi Futsal, Naypyidaw, Myanmar	Laos	3–0	10–1	Futsal at the 2013 Southeast Asian Games
12.	13 December 2013	Wunna Theikdi Futsal, Naypyidaw, Myanmar	Laos	8–0	10–1	Futsal at the 2013 Southeast Asian Games
13.	15 November 2014	Ginásio Poliesportivo Adib Moysés Dib, São Bernardo do Campo, Brazil	Colombia	2–3	2–6	2014 Grand Prix de Futsal
14.	22 September 2014	Stadium Melawati, Shah Alam, Malaysia	Laos	16–0	18–0	2014 AFF Futsal Championship
15.	2 May 2014	Phu Tho Gymnasium, Ho Chi Minh City, Vietnam	Tajikistan	1–0	10–4	2014 AFC Futsal Championship
16.	9 February 2015	Novigrad, Croatia	Slovenia	2–2	6–4	Friendly
17.	9 February 2015	Novigrad, Croatia	Slovenia	4–3	6–4	Friendly
18.	8 October 2015	Bangkok Arena, Bangkok, Thailand	Laos	9–1	13–1	2015 AFF Futsal Championship
19.	10 October 2015	Bangkok Arena, Bangkok, Thailand	Myanmar	1–0	2–1	2015 AFF Futsal Championship
20.	10 October 2015	Bangkok Arena, Bangkok, Thailand	Myanmar	2–1	2–1	2015 AFF Futsal Championship
21.	11 October 2015	Bangkok Arena, Bangkok, Thailand	Philippines	10–1	19–1	2015 AFF Futsal Championship
22.	11 October 2015	Bangkok Arena, Bangkok, Thailand	Philippines	11–1	19–1	2015 AFF Futsal Championship
23.	12 October 2015	Bangkok Arena, Bangkok, Thailand	Australia	3–4	5–6	2015 AFF Futsal Championship
24.	16 October 2015	Bangkok Arena, Bangkok, Thailand	Malaysia	3–1	5–6	2015 AFF Futsal Championship
25.	2 February 2016	Uzbekistan Stadium, Tashkent, Uzbekistan	Uzbekistan	2–1	3–3	Friendly
26.	2 February 2016	Uzbekistan Stadium, Tashkent, Uzbekistan	Uzbekistan	3–2	3–3	Friendly
27.	11 February 2016	Uzbekistan Stadium, Tashkent, Uzbekistan	Tajikistan	2–1	8–1	2016 AFC Futsal Championship
28.	11 February 2016	Uzbekistan Stadium, Tashkent	Tajikistan	8–1	8–1	2016 AFC Futsal Championship
29.	17 February 2016	Uzbekistan Stadium, Tashkent, Uzbekistan	Japan	1–2	4–4 (Pen 2-1)	2016 AFC Futsal Championship
30.	17 February 2016	Uzbekistan Stadium, Tashkent, Uzbekistan	Japan	3–3	4–4 (Pen 2-1)	2016 AFC Futsal Championship
31.	11 September 2016	Coliseo El Pueblo, Cali, Colombia	Guatemala	4–2	4–2	2016 FIFA Futsal World Cup
32.	14 September 2016	Coliseo El Pueblo, Cali, Colombia	Paraguay	1–7	1–7	2016 FIFA Futsal World Cup
33.	3 December 2016	Changsha Stadium, Changsha, China	Mexico	1–1	4–3	Friendly
34.	3 December 2016	Changsha Stadium, Changsha, China	Mexico	4–3	4–3	Friendly
35.	4 December 2016	Changsha Stadium, Changsha, China	China	1–0	2–2	Friendly
36.	22 August 2017	Panasonic Stadium, Shah Alam, Malaysia	Myanmar	1–0	6–1	Futsal at the 2017 Southeast Asian Games
37.	20 October 2017	Changsha Stadium, Changsha, China	Croatia	1–3	1–3	Friendly
38.	27 October 2017	Phú Thọ Indoor Stadium, Ho Chi Minh City, Vietnam	Philippines	24–0	24–0	2017 AFF Futsal Championship
39.	27 October 2017	Phú Thọ Indoor Stadium, Ho Chi Minh City, Vietnam	Philippines	24–0	24–0	2017 AFF Futsal Championship
40.	5 November 2018	GOR UNY, Yogyakarta, Indonesia	Brunei	9–0	9–0	2018 AFF Futsal Championship
41.	7 November 2018	GOR UNY, Yogyakarta, Indonesia	Thailand	1–0	1–4	2018 AFF Futsal Championship
41.	27 October 2019	Phú Thọ Indoor Stadium, Ho Chi Minh City, Vietnam	Myanmar	4–2	7–3	2019 AFF Futsal Championship
42.	27 October 2019	Phú Thọ Indoor Stadium, Ho Chi Minh City, Vietnam	Myanmar	6–3	7–3	2019 AFF Futsal Championship

== Honours ==
Thái Sơn Nam

- Vietnam Futsal League
  - Winners (6): 2013, 2014, 2016, 2017,2018, 2019
- Vietnamese National Futsal Cup
  - Winners (3): 2016, 2017, 2018
- AFC Futsal Club Championship
  - Runner-up (1): 2018
  - Third place (3): 2015, 2017. 2019

Vietnam

- AFC Futsal Championship
  - Fourth place (1): 2016
- AFF Futsal Championship
  - Runner-up (1): 2012
  - Third place (3): 2013, 2014, 2019
