= 2012 AFF Futsal Championship =

AFF Futsal Championship Thailand 2012

Tournament details
- Host country: Thailand
- City: Bangkok
- Dates: 19–27 April
- Teams: 10 (from 1 confederation)
- Venue: 1 (in 1 host city)

Final positions
- Champions: Thailand (8th title)
- Runners-up: Vietnam
- Third place: Indonesia
- Fourth place: Malaysia

Tournament statistics
- Matches played: 14
- Goals scored: 267 (19.07 per match)
- Top scorer: Kritsada Wongkaeo (16 goals)

The 2012 AFF Futsal Championship was the ninth edition of the tournament which was held in Bangkok, Thailand from 19 to 27 April 2012. It was originally scheduled for the 17 to 27 April but was moved back by two days at the request of the Timor-Leste Football Federation due to the majority of their players coming from the Police Force who are required to vote in the local elections, and would not be able to leave the country without doing so. All member nations of the ASEAN Football Federation (AFF) have entered except for Singapore.

Due to certain logistical complications, all matches were played at the Chanchai Acadium, after initially having a schedule of concurrent matches at Kiraves Indoor Stadium, Thai-Japanese Stadium.

== Venue ==
Chanchai Acadium
Capacity: 6,000 seating
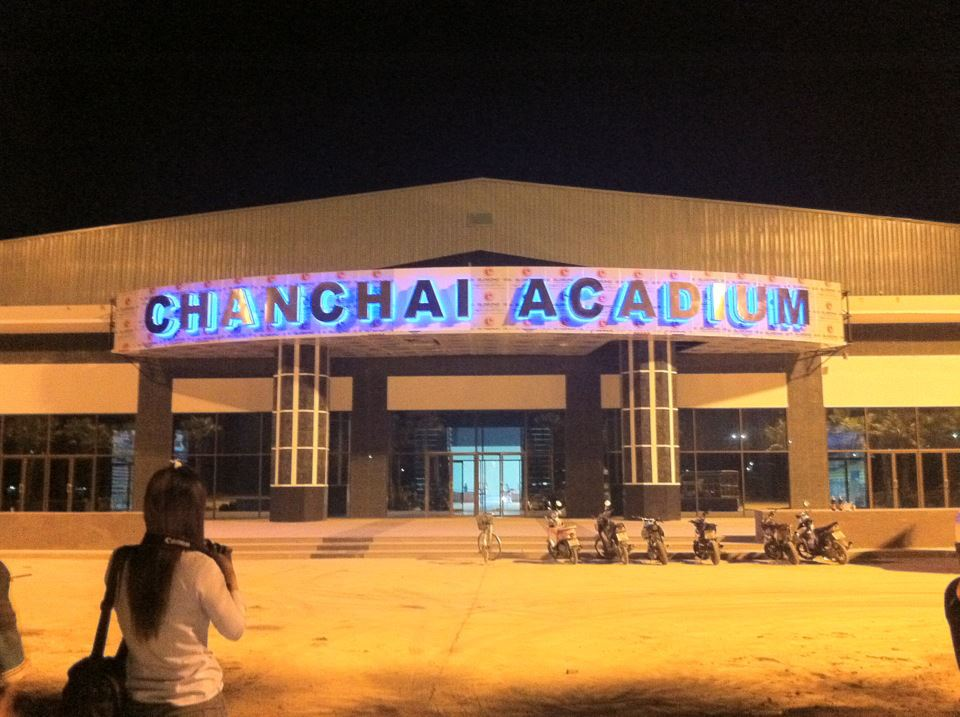

== Group stage ==
All times are Indochina Time (ICT) - UTC+7

=== Group A ===
| Team | Pld | W | D | L | GF | GA | GD | Pts |
|---|---|---|---|---|---|---|---|---|
| Vietnam | 4 | 4 | 0 | 0 | 20 | 4 | +16 | 12 |
| Malaysia | 4 | 3 | 0 | 1 | 19 | 8 | +11 | 9 |
| Cambodia | 4 | 1 | 0 | 3 | 16 | 24 | −8 | 3 |
| Myanmar | 4 | 1 | 0 | 3 | 11 | 19 | −8 | 3 |
| Philippines | 4 | 1 | 0 | 3 | 12 | 23 | −11 | 3 |

19 April 2012
11:30

| Cambodia | 0 – 8 | Malaysia |
|---|---|---|
| | Report | Zahari 4'; Fawzul 8', 18'; Qaiser 10', 28', 32'; Fariq 35'; Zubaidee 36' |

Chanchai Acadium
Bangkokthonburi University, Bangkok
19 April 2012
14:00

| Myanmar | 4 – 5 | Philippines |
|---|---|---|
| Pyae Phyo Maung 26', 29'; Tin Win Ko Ko 34'; Than Wunna Aung 36' | Report | Bahadoran 2', 3', 22', 23', 30' |

Chanchai Acadium
Bangkokthonburi University, Bangkok

20 April 2012
11:30

| Philippines | 1 – 6 | Vietnam |
|---|---|---|
| Bahadoran 16' | Report | Luu Quynh Toan 5'; Bui Van Thang 19'; Tran Hoang Vinh 25', 27'; Nguyen Bao Quan 25'; Pham Thanh Tuan 39' |

Chanchai Acadium
Bangkokthonburi University, Bangkok
20 April 2012
14:00

| Myanmar | 7 – 6 | Cambodia |
|---|---|---|
| Aung Aung 8'; Tin Win Ko Ko 13', 28', 39'; Kyaw Kyaw Tun 4', 27'; Pyae Pyho Maung 33' | Report | Sothearith 7', 16', 23'; Slauth 23', 39'; Sangpavich 30' |

Chanchai Acadium
Bangkokthonburi University, Bangkok

21 April 2012
11:30

| Vietnam | 3 – 0 | Myanmar |
|---|---|---|
| Luu Quynh Toan 13'; Nguyen Quoc Bao (?); Tran Van Vu (?) | Report |

Chanchai Acadium
Bangkokthonburi University, Bangkok
21 April 2012
16:30

| Malaysia | 4 – 1 | Philippines |
|---|---|---|
| Muizzudin 24'; Zubaidee 30'; Qaiser 34'; Fawzul (?) | Report | Bahadoran (?) |

Chanchai Acadium
Bangkokthonburi University, Bangkok

22 April 2012
11:30

| Myanmar | 0 – 5 | Malaysia |
|---|---|---|
| | Report | Asmie 5' (?); Fawzul (?); Fariq 39' (pen.) |

Chanchai Acadium
Bangkokthonburi University, Bangkok
22 April 2012
16:30

| Cambodia | 1 – 4 | Vietnam |
|---|---|---|
| Yaneat (?) | Report | Pham Thanh Dat (?); Phung Trong Luan (?); Pham Thanh Tuan 33'; Nguyen Trong Thien 34' |

Chanchai Acadium
Bangkokthonburi University, Bangkok

23 April 2012
11:30

| Philippines | 5 – 9 | Cambodia |
|---|---|---|
| | Report |

Chanchai Acadium
Bangkokthonburi University, Bangkok
23 April 2012
14:00

| Malaysia | 2 – 7 | Vietnam |
|---|---|---|
| Fawzul (?); Akmar (?) | Report | Nguyen Hoang Giang (?), 37'; Pham Thanh Dat (?), 16'; Nguyen Bao Quan (?); Luu Quynh Toan 35'; Nguyen Trong Thien 38' |

Chanchai Acadium
Bangkokthonburi University, Bangkok

=== Group B ===
| Team | Pld | W | D | L | GF | GA | GD | Pts |
|---|---|---|---|---|---|---|---|---|
| Thailand | 4 | 4 | 0 | 0 | 73 | 4 | +68 | 12 |
| Indonesia | 4 | 3 | 0 | 1 | 38 | 11 | +27 | 9 |
| Brunei | 4 | 1 | 0 | 3 | 13 | 43 | −30 | 3 |
| Laos | 4 | 1 | 0 | 3 | 15 | 48 | −33 | 3 |
| Timor-Leste | 4 | 1 | 0 | 3 | 10 | 43 | −33 | 3 |

19 April 2012
16:30

| Timor-Leste | 1 – 16 | Indonesia |
|---|---|---|
| Manuel 18' | Report | Lubis 5', 6', 23', 31'; Andri 10', 11', 31', 32'; Septian 12', 19', 30', 40'; Ali 18'; Karami 19'; Ismail 26'; Fachri 38' |

Chanchai Acadium
Bangkokthonburi University, Bangkok
19 April 2012
19:00

| Laos | 8 – 6 | Brunei |
|---|---|---|
| Souksabai 1', 31', 37'; Nidnilanh 8'; Khounsombath 9'; Bounmalay 29' (pen.), 33', 35' | Report | Maziri 12', 39'; Anaqi 21', 22'; Junaidi 28'; Norazizam 34' |

Chanchai Acadium
Bangkokthonburi University, Bangkok

20 April 2012
17:00

| Brunei | 0 – 22 | Thailand |
|---|---|---|
| | Report | Thueanklang 1', 2', 6', 20', 25'; Wongkaeo 3', 12', 22', 35', 36'; Chudech 6', 7'; Sornwichian 12', 18', 26'; Ahamah 17', 34', 40'; Ulfi 23' (o.g.); Penpakul 26'; Madlayalan 33'; Chaemcharoen 38' |

Chanchai Acadium
Bangkokthonburi University, Bangkok
20 April 2012
19:30

| Laos | 3 – 4 | Timor-Leste |
|---|---|---|
| Inthavong (?); Souksabai (?); Phouangphet (?) | Report | Manuel (?); Vong (?) |

Chanchai Acadium
Bangkokthonburi University, Bangkok

21 April 2012
14:00

| Thailand | 26 – 2 | Laos |
|---|---|---|
| Thueanklang 1' (?); Wongkaeo (?); Sornwichian (?); Chaemcharoen (?); Ahamah (?); Chudech (?); Penpakul (?); Luksanato (?) | Report | Chanthavong 26'; Inthavong 38' |

Chanchai Acadium
Bangkokthonburi University, Bangkok
21 April 2012
19:00

| Indonesia | 9 – 2 | Brunei |
|---|---|---|
| Andri (?); Lubis (?); Randhyas (?); Ismail (?) | Report | Faizul (?); Raimi (?) |

Chanchai Acadium
Bangkokthonburi University, Bangkok

22 April 2012
14:00

| Timor-Leste | 1 – 19 | Thailand |
|---|---|---|
| (?) | Report | Chudech (?); Wongkaeo (?); Madyalan (?) (?) (?) (?) (?) (?) (?) (?) (?) (?) |

Chanchai Acadium
Bangkokthonburi University, Bangkok
22 April 2012
19:00

| Laos | 2 – 12 | Indonesia |
|---|---|---|
| Chantavong (?) | Report | Randhyas 7', 22'; Andri 8'; Karami (?), 32'; Fachri (?); Roni (?), 38'; Rahmad (?), 28', 37'; Septian 40' |

Chanchai Acadium
Bangkokthonburi University, Bangkok

23 April 2012
16:30

| Brunei | 5 – 4 | Timor-Leste |
|---|---|---|
| Fachri 4'; Faiz 7'; Safwan 10'; Faizul 16', 17' | Report | Manuel 6', 8', 23', 26' |

Chanchai Acadium
Bangkokthonburi University, Bangkok
23 April 2012
19:00

| Indonesia | 1 – 6 | Thailand |
|---|---|---|
| Andri 23' | Report | Kritsada 2'; Apiwat 6'; Suphawut 10', 34'; Jetsada 25'; Piyapan 33' |

Chanchai Acadium
Bangkokthonburi University, Bangkok

== Knockout stage ==
=== Bracket ===
Semi-finals
25 April – Bangkok
Vietnam | 5
Indonesia | 3
25 April – Bangkok
Thailand | 12
Malaysia | 1

Final
27 April – Bangkok
Vietnam | 4
Thailand | 9
Third place
27 April – Bangkok
Malaysia | 2
Indonesia | 4

=== Semi-finals ===
25 April 2012
14:00

| Vietnam | 5 – 3 | Indonesia |
|---|---|---|
| Nguyen Trong Thien 13'; Bui Van Thang 15'; Nguyen Hoang Giang 34'; Nguyen Quoc Bao 37', 39' | Report | Karami 15'; Syahidansyah 31'; Saptaji (?) |

Chanchai Acadium
Bangkokthonburi University, Bangkok

25 April 2012
17:00

| Thailand | 12 – 1 | Malaysia |
|---|---|---|
| Suphawut 1', 13', 20', 26', 28'; Jirawat 5'; Nattawut 9', 38'; Jetsada 15', 17'; Kritsada 19', 26' | Report | Qaiser 35' |

Chanchai Acadium
Bangkokthonburi University, Bangkok

=== Third place play-off ===
27 April 2012
14:00

| Indonesia | 4 – 2 | Malaysia |
|---|---|---|
| Karami 15'; Ismail 21'; Randhyas 24', 32' | Report | Fawzul 17'; Zubaidee (?) |

Chanchai Acadium
Bangkokthonburi University, Bangkok
Referee: Kaveepol Kamawitee (Thailand)

=== Final ===
27 April 2012
17:00

| Vietnam | 4 – 9 | Thailand |
|---|---|---|
| Luu Quynh Toan 19' (pen.); Tran Van Vu 29'; Nguyen Trong Thien 36'; Tran Hoang Vinh 37' | Report | Suphawut 2', 5', 20' (pen.); Apiwat 25'; Jetsada 28'; Kritsada 31', 31' (?) (?) |

Chanchai Acadium
Bangkokthonburi University, Bangkok
Referee: Heldy Idang (Malaysia)

== Winner ==
2012 ASEAN Futsal Championship winners

Thailand
8th title

== Goalscorers ==
List is incomplete due to unknown scorers in several matches

21 goals

- (Thailand) Suphawut Thueanklang

16 goals

- (Thailand) Kritsada Wongkaeo

11 goals

- (Thailand) Jetsada Chudech

8 goals

- (Indonesia) Andri Kustiawan

7 goals

- (Philippines) Misagh Bahadoran

6 goals

- (Indonesia) Syahidansyah Lubis
- (Thailand) Aref Ahamah
- (Timor-Leste) Manuel Varela Pereira

5 goals

- (Malaysia) Fawzul Mohamad
- (Thailand) Jirawat Sornwichian
- (Thailand) Apiwat Chaemcharoen

4 goals

- (Indonesia) Septian Cahya
- (Laos) Kita Souksabai
- (Malaysia) Qaiser Khadir
- (Myanmar) Tin Win Ko Ko

3 goals

- (Cambodia) I Sothearith
- (Indonesia) Ismail
- (Laos) Tona Bounmalay
- (Malaysia) Asmie Zahari
- (Myanmar) Pyae Phyo Maung
- (Thailand) Nattawut Madlayan
- (Timor-Leste) Jose Vong

2 goals

- (Brunei) Anaqi Sufi Bak
- (Brunei) Maziri Maidin
- (Cambodia) Eung Slauth
- (Indonesia) Randhyas Syamsul Bahri
- (Laos) Saysana Inthavong
- (Malaysia) Fariq Mohamad
- (Malaysia) Zubaidee Alwi
- (Myanmar) Kyaw Kyaw Tun
- (Thailand) Thanakorn Penpakul
- (Vietnam) Luu Quynh Toan
- (Vietnam) Tran Hoang Vinh

1 goal

- (Brunei) Faizul Jery Zaini
- (Brunei) Junaidi Jumat
- (Brunei) Noor Raimi Syahremy Karim
- (Brunei) Norazizam Roslan
- (Cambodia) Seun Sangpavich
- (Indonesia) Fachri Reza
- (Indonesia) Karami Balfas
- (Indonesia) Nur Ali
- (Laos) Alounpadeth Phouangphet
- (Laos) Khounsombath Phommaxay
- (Laos) Nidnilanh Chanchaleune
- (Laos) Chantavong
- (Malaysia) Muizzudin Mohd Haris
- (Myanmar) Aung Aung
- (Myanmar) Than Wunna Aung
- (Thailand) Nattawat Luksanato
- (Thailand) Piyapan Rattana
- (Vietnam) Bui Van Thang
- (Vietnam) Nguyen Bao Quan
- (Vietnam) Nguyen Quoc Bao
- (Vietnam) Pham Thanh Tuan
- (Vietnam) Tran Van Vu

Own goal

- (Brunei) Ulfi Aminuddin (For Thailand)
