= Singapore national futsal team =

- Nickname(s): The Lions
- Association: Football Association of Singapore
- Confederation: AFC (Asia)
- FIFA code: SIN
- FIFA ranking: NR (24 September 2026)
Home colours	Away colours

First international
- Singapore 5–9 China (Singapore, Singapore; 4 December 1997)

Biggest win
- Malaysia 0–3 Singapore (Shah Alam, Malaysia; 8 June 2001); Singapore 3–0 Brunei (Shah Alam, Malaysia; 9 June 2001)

Biggest defeat
- Iran 36–0 Singapore (Kuala Lumpur, Malaysia; 7 March 1999)

FIFA World Cup
- Appearances: None

AFC Futsal Championship
- Appearances: 3 (First in 1999)
- Best result: Round 1 (1999, 2000, 2001)

AFF Futsal Championship
- Appearances: 2 (First in 2001)
- Best result: (silver) 2nd place (2001)

The Singapore national futsal team is controlled by the Football Association of Singapore, the governing body for futsal in Singapore. It represents the country in international competitions, such as the World Cup and the AFC Futsal Championship.

== Tournaments ==
=== FIFA Futsal World Cup ===
- 1989 – Did not enter
- 1992 – Did not enter
- 1996 – Did not enter
- 2000 – Did not qualify
- 2004 – Did not enter
- 2008 – Did not enter
- 2012 – Did not enter
- 2016 – Did not qualify
- 2021 – Did not qualify
- 2024 – Did not enter

=== AFC Futsal Championship ===
- 1999 – Round 1
- 2000 – Round 1
- 2001 – Round 1
- 2002 – Did not enter
- 2003 – Did not enter
- 2004 – Did not enter
- 2005 – Did not enter
- 2006 – Did not enter
- 2007 – Did not enter
- 2008 – Did not enter
- 2010 – Did not enter
- 2012 – Did not enter
- 2014 – Did not enter
- 2016 – Did not qualify
- 2018 – Did not enter

=== AFF Futsal Championship ===
- 2001 – Second Place
- 2003–2014 – Did not participate
- 2015 – Group Stage
- 2016–2017 – Did not participate

== All-time team record against other opponents ==
Against	Played	Won	Drawn	Lost	GF	GA	GD
Australia	1	1	0	0	6	5	+1
Brazil	2	0	0	2	4	45	−41
Brunei	2	1	0	1	4	2	+2
China	1	0	0	1	5	9	–4
Chinese Taipei	1	0	0	1	3	7	−4
Egypt	1	0	0	1	1	5	−4
Iran	2	0	0	2	0	64	–64
Italy	1	0	0	1	1	7	–6
Japan	1	0	0	1	1	8	–7
Kazakhstan	1	0	0	1	0	19	−19
Kyrgyzstan	1	0	0	1	5	9	–4
Malaysia	3	1	1	1	7	9	−2
Myanmar	1	0	0	1	2	7	−5
Netherlands	1	0	0	1	1	8	–7
Palestine	1	0	0	1	2	9	–7
Philippines	1	0	0	1	1	4	−3
South Korea	2	0	0	2	3	25	−22
Spain	1	0	0	1	0	10	−10
Thailand	6	0	0	6	4	72	−68
Timor-Leste	1	0	0	1	3	6	−3
Vietnam	1	0	0	1	1	2	–1
Total	32	3	1	28	54	332	−278
