= Cambodia national futsal team =

Cambodia
- Nickname(s): អ្នកចម្បាំងអង្គរ ("Angkor Warriors"); គោព្រៃកម្ពុជា ("Koupreys of Cambodia")
- Association: FFC
- Confederation: AFC (Asia)
- Head coach: Ney Bunsopheaktra
- Asst coach: Chet Chanrachana
- Captain: Lak Phirun
- FIFA code: CAM
- FIFA ranking: 121 (24 September 2026)
Home colours	Away colours

First international
- Brunei 8–7 Cambodia (Kuantan, Malaysia, 1 June 2003)

Biggest win
- Macau 2-11 Cambodia (Dushanbe, Tajikistan, 24 September 2025)

Biggest defeat
- Indonesia 29–0 Cambodia (Kuantan, Malaysia; 6 July 2003)

The Cambodia national futsal team represents Cambodia in international futsal and is administered by the Football Federation of Cambodia.

== Tournament ==
=== FIFA Futsal World Cup ===
FIFA World Cup Record
Year	Round	Pld	W	D*	L	GS	GA
(Netherlands) 1989	Did not enter						
(Hong Kong) 1992	Did not enter						
(Spain) 1996	Did not enter						
(Guatemala) 2000	Did not enter						
(Taiwan) 2004	Did not qualify						
(Brazil) 2008	Did not enter						
(Thailand) 2012	Did not qualify						
(Colombia) 2016	Did not Enter						
(Lithuania) 2021	Did not qualify						
(Uzbekistan) 2024	Did not qualify						
Total	.	.	.	.	.	.	.

=== AFC Futsal Championship ===
AFC Futsal Championship
Year	Round	Pld	W	D*	L	GS	GA
(Malaysia) 1999	Did not enter						
(Thailand) 2000	Did not enter						
(Iran) 2001	Did not enter						
(Indonesia) 2002	Did not enter						
(Iran) 2003	Did not enter						
(Macau) 2004	Group stage	4	1	0	3	12	46
(Vietnam) 2005	Did not enter						
(Uzbekistan) 2006	Did not qualify						
(Japan) 2007	Did not enter						
(Thailand) 2008	Did not enter						
(Uzbekistan) 2010	Did not qualify						
(United Arab Emirates) 2012	Did not qualify						
(Vietnam) 2014	Did not enter						
(Uzbekistan) 2016	Did not enter						
(Taiwan) 2018	Did not enter						
(Turkmenistan) 2020	Cancelled						
(Kuwait) 2022	Did not qualify						
(Thailand) 2024	Did not qualify						
(Indonesia) 2026	Did not qualify						
Total	Group stage	4	1	0	3	12	46

=== AFF Futsal Championship ===
AFF Futsal Championship
Year	Round	Pld	W	D*	L	GS	GA
(Malaysia) 2001	Did not enter						
(Malaysia) 2003	4th place	6	1	0	5	26	40
(Thailand) 2005	Did not enter						
(Thailand) 2006	4th place	4	2	0	2	14	21
(Thailand) 2007	Did not enter						
(Thailand) 2008	Did not enter						
(Vietnam) 2009	Did not enter						
(Vietnam) 2010	Did not enter						
(Thailand) 2012	Group Stage	4	1	0	3	16	24
(Thailand) 2013	Did not enter						
(Malaysia) 2014	Did not enter						
(Thailand) 2015	Did not enter						
(Thailand) 2016	Did not enter						
(Vietnam) 2017	Did not enter						
(Indonesia) 2018	Group Stage	3	0	0	3	2	34
(Vietnam) 2019	Group Stage	3	0	0	3	7	29
(Thailand) 2020	Cancelled						
(Thailand) 2021	Cancelled						
(Thailand) 2022	Group Stage	4	0	1	3	10	36
(Thailand) 2024	Group Stage	2	0	0	2	4	14
(Thailand) 2026	Withdrew						
Total	Group Stage	26	4	1	21	79	198

== Results and fixtures ==
=== 2026 ===
8 November Friendly	Cambodia	3-0	Brunei	Phnom Penh, Cambodia
19:30 UTC+7	Sichamroeun 9'; Sochetra 21'; Cheatou 25'			Stadium: National Sports Training Center

10 November Friendly	Cambodia	4-1	Brunei	Phnom Penh, Cambodia
19:30 UTC+7	Chanmony 3'; Sichamroeun 25'; Sochetra 38'; Sobotra 39'		Haziq 3'	Stadium: National Sports Training Center

== Players ==
The following 19 players were called up for the 2024 ASEAN Futsal Championship will be held on 4–10 November 2024 in Thailand

No.	Pos.	Player	Date of birth (age)	Caps	Club
1	GK	Kim Simeng			(Cambodia) Mihel Seoul Young Guns FC
2	FP	Hing Sokpov			(Cambodia) Lucky Futsal Club
3	FP	Kun Lundaroath			(Cambodia) DIG FC
4	FP	Prak Sovannarith			(Cambodia) DIG FC
5	FP	Prum Diamant			(Cambodia) Tai Chi FC
6	FP	Lak Phirun			(Cambodia) Lucky Futsal Club
7	FP	Cheap Reachhea			(Cambodia) Ov Mal FC
8	FP	Keo Cheatuo			(Cambodia) Lucky Futsal Club
9	FP	Tong Chanmony			(Cambodia) Lucky Futsal Club
10	FP	Nget Seyha			(Cambodia) Lucky Futsal Club
11	FP	Keo Sochetra			(Cambodia) Lucky Futsal Club
12	FP	Rous Sichamroeun			(Cambodia) Mihel Seoul Young Guns FC
13	GK	Khek Chansombath			(Cambodia) Lucky Futsal Club
14	FP	Nhek Thalida			(Cambodia) Ov Mal FC
	FP	Setha Sachakboth			(Cambodia) Lucky Futsal Club
	FP	Chhin Sovanhorng			(Cambodia) Neverlose FC
	FP	Ol Panha			(Cambodia) DIG FC
	GK	Sokha Chamnab			(Cambodia) C Light Futsal Club
	FP	Choup Seyha			(Cambodia) C Light Futsal Club
	FP	Duk Sophart			(Cambodia) Lucky Futsal Club

== Coaching staff ==
Position	Name
Head coach	(Cambodia) Ney Bunsopheaktra
Assistant coach	(Cambodia) Chet Chanrachana (Cambodia) Puth Sotheara
Goalkeeper coach	(Cambodia) Nuon Veasna
