= ASEAN Futsal Championship =

Futsal tournament

- Organiser(s): AFF
- Founded: 2001
- Region: Southeast Asia
- Teams: 9 (finals)
- Current champions: Thailand (17th title)
- Most championships: Thailand (17 titles)
- 2026 ASEAN Futsal Championship

The ASEAN Futsal Championship (formerly known as the AFF Futsal Championship) is a biennal international futsal competition of the Southeast Asian nations and is sanctioned by the ASEAN Football Federation (AFF). It was first held in 2001 which took place every two years only until 2005, when it became an annual competition. Thailand have won every edition of the competition, except in 2010 when they did not participate, and in 2024 after being defeated by Indonesia in the semifinals. From 2013 to 2022, the competitions in odd years were served as qualification for the AFC Futsal Asian Cup.

== Results ==
#	Year	Host	Final			Third-place match			Num. teams
#	Year	Host	Champion	Score	Second place	Third place	Score	Fourth place	Num. teams
1	2001; Details	Malaysia	Thailand	12–1	Singapore	Malaysia	No playoffs	Brunei	5
2	2003; Details	Malaysia	Thailand	4–0	Malaysia	Indonesia	5–3	Cambodia	6
3	2005; Details	Thailand	Thailand	5–1	Malaysia	Indonesia	7–1	Brunei	6
4	2006; Details	Thailand	Thailand	10–3	Indonesia	Myanmar	10–2	Cambodia	7
5	2007; Details	Thailand	Thailand	7–1	Australia	Malaysia	6−6 (3–1 pens.)	Vietnam	8
6	2008; Details	Thailand	Thailand	5–1	Indonesia	Malaysia	8–2	Brunei	8
7	2009; Details	Vietnam	Thailand	4–1	Vietnam	Indonesia	4–3	Philippines	7
8	2010; Details	Vietnam	Indonesia	5–0	Malaysia	Vietnam	No playoffs	Philippines	5
-	2011	Indonesia	Cancelled
9	2012; Details	Thailand	Thailand	9–4	Vietnam	Indonesia	4–2	Malaysia	10
10	2013; Details	Thailand	Thailand	2–1	Australia	Vietnam	7–3	Indonesia	10
11	2014; Details	Malaysia	Thailand	6–0	Australia	Vietnam	2–2 (5–3 pens.)	Indonesia	10
12	2015; Details	Thailand	Thailand	5–3	Australia	Malaysia	6–5	Vietnam	10
13	2016*; Details	Thailand	Thailand	8−1	Myanmar	Malaysia	8−1	Timor-Leste	7
14	2017; Details	Vietnam	Thailand	4−3 (a.e.t)	Malaysia	Myanmar	2–2 (4–3 pens.)	Vietnam	9
15	2018; Details	Indonesia	Thailand	4−2	Malaysia	Indonesia	3−1	Vietnam	8
16	2019; Details	Vietnam	Thailand	5–0	Indonesia	Vietnam	7−3	Myanmar	8
-	2020	Thailand	Cancelled due to COVID-19 pandemic
-	2021	Thailand	Cancelled after Thailand was banned from hosting tournaments by WADA
17	2022; Details	Thailand	Thailand	2–2 (5–3 pens.)	Indonesia	Vietnam	1–1 (4–1 pens.)	Myanmar	9
18	2024; Details	Thailand	Indonesia	2–0	Vietnam	Thailand	4−0	Australia	9
19	2026; Details	Thailand	Thailand	2−1	Indonesia	Vietnam	4−0	Australia	9

- Held in early 2017

== Performance by nations ==
As of 2026

Rank	Nation	Champions	Runners-up	Third place	Fourth place
1	Thailand	17 (2001, 2003, 2005*, 2006*, 2007*, 2008*, 2009, 2012*, 2013*, 2014, 2015*, 2016*, 2017, 2018, 2019, 2022*, 2026*)		1 (2024*)	
2	Indonesia	2 (2010, 2024)	5 (2006, 2008, 2019, 2022, 2026)	5 (2003, 2005, 2009, 2012, 2018*)	2 (2013, 2014)
3	Malaysia		5 (2003*, 2005, 2010, 2017, 2018)	5 (2001*, 2007, 2008, 2015, 2016)	1 (2012)
4	Australia		4 (2007, 2013, 2014, 2015)		2 (2024, 2026)
5	Vietnam		3 (2009*, 2012, 2024)	6 (2010*, 2013, 2014, 2019*, 2022, 2026)	4 (2007, 2015, 2017*, 2018)
6	Myanmar		1 (2016)	2 (2006, 2017)	2 (2019, 2022)
7	Singapore		1 (2001)		
8	Brunei				3 (2001, 2005, 2008)
9	Cambodia				2 (2003, 2006)
10	Philippines				2 (2009, 2010)
11	Timor-Leste				1 (2016)

* = hosts

== Medals ==
As of 2026

Rank	Nation	Gold	Silver	Bronze	Total
1	Thailand (THA)	17	0	1	18
2	Indonesia (INA)	2	5	5	12
3	Malaysia (MAS)	0	5	5	10
4	Australia (AUS)	0	4	0	4
5	Vietnam (VIE)	0	3	6	9
6	Myanmar (MYA)	0	1	2	3
7	Singapore (SIN)	0	1	0	1
Totals (7 entries)		19	19	19	57

== Summary ==
As of 2026

Rank	Nation	Part	M	W	D	L	GF	GA	GD	Points
1	Thailand	18	96	90	2	4	830	141	+689	279
2	Indonesia	17	80	51	5	24	447	214	+233	173
3	Malaysia	19	86	45	3	38	357	283	+74	138
4	Vietnam	15	76	40	8	28	367	217	+150	137
5	Myanmar	16	60	24	4	35	294	261	+33	76
6	Australia	8	34	23	1	15	208	108	+100	70
7	Timor-Leste	12	41	8	2	31	91	332	–241	26
8	Brunei	16	54	8	2	44	114	454	–340	26
9	Philippines	12	41	6	1	34	90	317	–227	19
10	Cambodia	7	27	4	1	22	81	207	–126	13
11	Laos	7	17	3	1	13	40	161	–121	10
12	Singapore	2	8	2	0	6	21	35	–13	6

== Participating nations ==
Legend

- 1st – Champions
- 2nd – Runners-up
- 3rd – Third place
- 4th – Fourth place
- – = Did not participate
- GS = Group stage
- N/A = Not an AFF member
- – Hosts

Nation	(Malaysia) 2001	(Malaysia) 2003	(Thailand) 2005	(Thailand) 2006	(Thailand) 2007	(Thailand) 2008	(Vietnam) 2009	(Vietnam) 2010	(Thailand) 2012	(Thailand) 2013	(Malaysia) 2014	(Thailand) 2015	(Thailand) 2016	(Vietnam) 2017	(Indonesia) 2018	(Vietnam) 2019	(Thailand) 2022	(Thailand) 2024	(Thailand) 2026
Australia	N/A				2nd*	N/A				2nd	2nd	2nd	–	–	–	GS	GS	4th	4th
Brunei	4th	GS	4th	GS	GS	4th	–	–	GS	GS	GS	GS	GS	GS	GS	–	GS	GS	GS
Cambodia	–	4th	–	4th	–	–	–	–	GS	–	–	–	–	–	GS	GS	GS	GS	–
Timor-Leste	N/A		–	–	–	–	GS	–	GS	GS	GS	GS	4th	GS	GS	GS	GS	GS	GS
Indonesia	–	3rd	3rd	2nd	GS	2nd	3rd	1st	3rd	4th	4th	–	GS	GS	3rd	2nd	2nd	1st	2nd
Laos	–	–	–	–	–	GS	–	–	GS	GS	GS	GS	GS	GS	–	–	–	–	–
Malaysia	3rd	2nd	2nd	GS	3rd	3rd	GS	2nd	4th	GS	GS	3rd	3rd	2nd	2nd	GS	GS	GS	GS
Myanmar	–	–	–	3rd	GS	GS	GS	GS	GS	GS	GS	GS	2nd	3rd	GS	4th	4th	GS	GS
Philippines	GS	GS	GS	–	GS	GS	4th	4th	GS	GS	GS	GS	–	GS	–	–	–	–	–
Singapore	2nd	–	–	–	–	–	–	–	–	–	–	GS	–	–	–	–	–	–	–
Thailand	1st	1st	1st	1st	1st	1st	1st	–	1st	1st	1st	1st	1st	1st	1st	1st	1st	3rd	1st
Vietnam	–	–	GS	GS	4th	GS	2nd	3rd	2nd	3rd	3rd	4th	–	4th	4th	3rd	3rd	2nd	3rd

* Australia participated in 2007 as a guest.

== Awards ==
Year	Best player	Top scorer	Goals	Fair play award	Best goalkeeper
2007		(Thailand) Prasert Innui			
2008	(Thailand) Suphawut Thueanklang	(Indonesia) Topas Pamungkas	7		
2009	(Thailand) Keattiyot Chalaemkhet	(Indonesia) Sayan Karmadi	10		
2010		(Philippines) Misagh Bahadoran	6		
2012		(Thailand) Kristada Wongkaeo	16		
2013		(Thailand) Suphawut Thueanklang	14		
2014		(Thailand) Jetsada Chudech	10		
2015		(Australia) Daniel Fogarty (Thailand) Jetsada Chudech	12		
2016	(Thailand) Jirawat Sornwichian	(Myanmar) Pyae Phyo Maung	8	Thailand	
2017		(Thailand) Muhammad Osamanmusa	13	Myanmar	
2018		(Thailand) Jetsada Chudech	10		
2019		(Thailand) Muhammad Osamanmusa	7	Vietnam	
2022	(Thailand) Kritsada Wongkaeo	(Thailand) Muhammad Osamanmusa	11		(Indonesia) Muhammad Albagir
2024	(Indonesia) Wendy Brian	(Thailand) Thanawat Koedbangrachan	7	Thailand	(Thailand) Jaroenpong Prasansat
2026	(Thailand) Itticha Praphaphan	(Australia) Jayden Jacob Harb	7		(Thailand) Theerawat Kaewwilai

== Winning coaches ==
Year	Team	Coach
2010	Indonesia	(Indonesia) Robby Hartono
2012	Thailand	(Netherlands) Victor Hermans
2013	Thailand	(Netherlands) Victor Hermans
2014	Thailand	(Netherlands) Victor Hermans
2015	Thailand	(Netherlands) Victor Hermans
2016	Thailand	(Spain) Miguel Rodrigo
2017	Thailand	(Spain) Jose Maria Pazos Mendez
2018	Thailand	(Spain) Jose Maria Pazos Mendez
2019	Thailand	(Spain) Jose Maria Pazos Mendez
2022	Thailand	(Spain) Carlos César Núñez Gago
2024	Indonesia	(Spain) Hector Souto
2026	Thailand	(Thailand) Rakphol Sainetngam

== See also ==
- ASEAN Women's Futsal Championship
- ASEAN U-16 Futsal Championship
- AFF Futsal Club Championship
