= Chanchai Acadium =

Indoor sporting arena in Bangkok, Thailand

Coordinates: 13.7702°N 100.3506°E

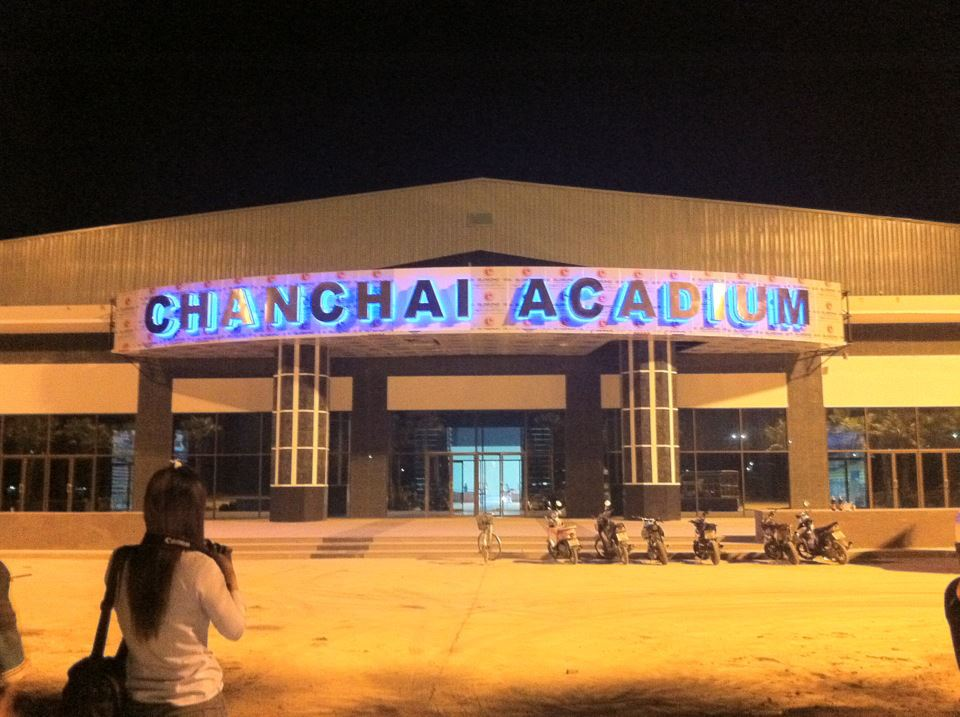
- Interactive map of Chanchai Acadium
- Location: Thawi Watthana, Bangkok, Thailand
- Owner: Bangkokthonburi University
- Capacity: 6,000

Construction
- Opened: 2012

Tenants
- 2012 Muaythai Fight; 2012 Carabao; 2013 Muaythai Fight; 2012 AFF Futsal Championship; 2013 AFF Futsal Championship

Chanchai Acadium (Thai: ชาญชัย อะคาเดียม, pronounced [t͡ɕʰāːn.t͡ɕʰāj ʔā.kʰāː.dīː.ʔâm]) is an indoor sporting arena, located in Bangkokthonburi University, Bangkok, Thailand. The seating capacity of the arena is 6,000 spectators and it was built in 2012 for the 2012 AFF Futsal Championship.

It is used mainly for concerts, boxing, basketball, futsal, and volleyball. It was also used as a rally venue for the Democrat Party for the 2019 general election on Friday, February 8 of the same year.
