= José Vide =

East Timorese footballer

Personal information
- Full name: José Skuartono López Vide
- Date of birth: 4 February 1987 (age 39)
- Place of birth: Sleman, Yogyakarta, Indonesia
- Height: 1.75 m (5 ft 9 in)
- Position: Midfielder

Team information
- Current team: Carsae
- Number: 18

Senior career*
Years	Team	Apps	(Gls)
2010–2011	FK Tauras Tauragė	12	(2)
2011–2013	PSSB Bireuen	38	(8)
2016	Karketu Dili		
2017–	Carsae		

International career^{‡}
2012–	Timor-Leste	9	(0)
2014–	Timor-Leste (futsal)		
- * Club domestic league appearances and goals as of 5 October 2012 ‡ National team caps and goals as of 5 November 2016

José Vide (born 4 February 1987) is an East Timorese footballer who plays as a midfielder for Carsae. He made his senior international debut against Cambodia on 5 October 2012.
