= Laos national futsal team =

Laos
- Association: Lao Football Federation
- Confederation: AFC (Asia)
- FIFA code: LAO
- FIFA ranking: NR (24 September 2026)
Home colours	Away colours

First international
- Vietnam 2–4 Laos (Bangkok, Thailand; 8 December 2007)

Biggest win
- Philippines 3–10 Laos (Bangkok, Thailand; 9 October 2015)

Biggest defeat
- Thailand 26–2 Laos (Bangkok, Thailand; 21 April 2012)

AFF Futsal Championship
- Appearances: 7 (First in 2008)
- Best result: Group stage, 7 times

The Laos national futsal team represents Laos in futsal.

== Tournaments ==
=== FIFA Futsal World Cup ===
- 1989 – Did not enter
- 1992 – Did not enter
- 1996 – Did not enter
- 2000 – Did not enter
- 2004 – Did not enter
- 2008 – Did not enter
- 2012 – Did not enter
- 2016 – Did not qualify
- 2021 – Did not qualify
- 2024 – Did not enter

=== AFC Futsal Championship ===
- 1999 – Did not enter
- 2000 – Did not enter
- 2001 – Did not enter
- 2002 – Did not enter
- 2003 – Did not enter
- 2004 – Did not enter
- 2005 – Did not enter
- 2006 – Did not enter
- 2007 – Did not enter
- 2008 – Did not enter
- 2010 – Did not enter
- 2012 – Did not enter
- 2014 – Did not qualify
- 2016 – Did not qualify
- 2018 – Did not qualify

=== AFF Futsal Championship ===
- 2001–2007 – Did not enter
- 2008 – Group stage
- 2009–2010 – Did not enter
- 2012–2015 – Group stage
- 2016–2017 – Group Stage

== Players ==
The following players were called up for the 2013 AFF Futsal Championship in Thailand during 19 – 27 October 2013.

No.	Pos.	Player	Date of birth (age)	Caps	Club
1	GK	Amphanvanh Chanthalavong			
2		Sisavat Duangmala			
3		Phoumai Souvandee			
4		Kita Souksabai			
5		Vilath Chanthavongsa			
6		Phayvanh Louanglath			
7		Sounthalay Xaysongkham			
8		Patthana Phommachak			
9		Soulichanh Phasawaeng			
10		Somphone Samphaonon (c)			
11		Panida Sinthapaseuth			
12	GK	Theva Inthavong			
13		Soukananh Phanphengdy			
14		Inpan Keomanixay			
