= Renaldi =

Indonesian footballer

Personal information
- Date of birth: 5 July 2003 (age 23)
- Place of birth: Makassar, Indonesia
- Height: 1.76 m (5 ft 9 in)
- Position: Defender

Youth career
- 2019–2021: PSM Makassar
- 2019–2020: Garuda Select

Senior career*
| Years | Team | Apps | (Gls) |
| 2021–2022 | PSM Makassar | 2 | (0) |
| 2021 | → Muba Babel United (loan) | 4 | (0) |
| 2022 | → Gresik United (loan) | 0 | (0) |
| 2023 | PSCS Cilacap | 2 | (0) |
| 2025 | Persika Karanganyar | 5 | (0) |
- * Club domestic league appearances and goals as of 5 February 2025

Renaldi (born 5 July 2003) is an Indonesian professional footballer who plays as a defender.

== Club career ==
=== PSM Makassar ===
He started playing professionally with Liga 1 club PSM Makassar in 2021. Renaldi made his league debut on 19 February 2022 in a match against Persita Tangerang at the Ngurah Rai Stadium, Denpasar.

== Career statistics ==
=== Club ===
As of 5 February 2025.

| Club | Season | League | | Cup | | Other | | Total | |
| Club | Season | Apps | Goals | Apps | Goals | Apps | Goals | Apps | Goals |
|---|---|---|---|---|---|---|---|---|---|
| PSM Makassar | 2021 | 2 | 0 | 0 | 0 | 0 | 0 | 2 | 0 |
| Muba Babel United (loan) | 2021 | 4 | 0 | 0 | 0 | 0 | 0 | 4 | 0 |
| Gresik United (loan) | 2022–23 | 0 | 0 | 0 | 0 | 0 | 0 | 0 | 0 |
| PSCS Cilacap | 2023–24 | 2 | 0 | 0 | 0 | 0 | 0 | 2 | 0 |
| Persika Karanganyar | 2024–25 | 5 | 0 | 0 | 0 | 0 | 0 | 5 | 0 |
| Career total | | 13 | 0 | 0 | 0 | 0 | 0 | 13 | 0 |
