= Piyapan Rattana =

Thai futsal player

Personal information
- Full name: Piyapan Rattana
- Date of birth: 16 July 1985 (age 41)
- Place of birth: Thailand
- Height: 1.78 m (5 ft 10 in)
- Position: Defensive midfielder

Team information
- Current team: Police United
- Number: 24

International career^{‡}
Years	Team	Apps	(Gls)
2004–2014	Thailand		
Medal record
Thailand national football team
Sea Games
Gold medal – first place	AFF Futsal Championship 2012	Futsal
Asian Championship
Silver medal – second place	AFC Futsal Championship 2012	Futsal
- ‡ National team caps and goals as of 13:05, 23 May 2008 (UTC)

Piyapan Rattana (Thai: ปิยพันธุ์ รัตนะ), is a Thai futsal Defender, and currently a member of Thailand national futsal team.
