= Khounsombath Phommaxay =

Laotian footballer

Personal information
- Date of birth: 8 January 1988 (age 38)
- Place of birth: Thakhek, Laos
- Height: 1.70 m (5 ft 7 in)
- Position: Defender

Team information
- Current team: Ministry of Health FC
- Number: 19

Senior career*
Years	Team	Apps	(Gls)
2013–2014	Lao Police Club		
2015–2016	Eastern Star F.C.		
2017–2020	Lao Police Club		
2020	Master 7		
2022-	Ministry of Health FC		

International career^{‡}
2017–	Laos	11	(0)
- * Club domestic league appearances and goals as of 16:54, March 17, 2021 (UTC) ‡ National team caps and goals as of 16:54, March 17, 2021 (UTC)

Khounsombath Phommaxay ຄຸນສົມບັດ ພົມມະໄຊ(born January 8 1998), is a Laotian footballer currently playing as a defender for Ministry of Health FC and the Laos national football team.

== Career statistics ==
=== International ===
As of matches played 17 March 2021.

National team	Year	Apps	Goals
Laos	2017	2	0
Laos	2018	4	0
Laos	2019	3	0
Total		11	1
