= Jetsada Chudech =

Thai futsal player

Personal information
- Full name: Jetsada Chudech
- Date of birth: 20 February 1989 (age 37)
- Place of birth: Bangkok, Thailand
- Height: 1.72 m (5 ft 7 1/2 in)
- Position: Pivot

Team information
- Current team: Port Futsal Club
- Number: 8

Youth career
- 2003–2008: Bangkok Sport School

Senior career*
Years	Team	Apps	(Gls)
2009–2021	Rajnavy Futsal Club	119	(180)
2016	→ Chonburi Bluewave (loan)	13	(17)
2018	→ IPC Pelindo II Jakarta (loan)	10	(12)
2021–	Port Futsal Club		

International career^{‡}
2011–	Thailand Futsal	57	(81)
Medal record
Thailand national football team
Sea Games
Gold medal – first place	2011 Southeast Asian Games	Futsal
Gold medal – first place	2013 Southeast Asian Games	Futsal
Gold medal – first place	2017 Southeast Asian Games	Futsal
AFF Futsal Championship
Gold medal – first place	AFF Futsal Championship 2009	Futsal
Gold medal – first place	AFF Futsal Championship 2012	Futsal
Gold medal – first place	AFF Futsal Championship 2013	Futsal
Gold medal – first place	AFF Futsal Championship 2014	Futsal
Gold medal – first place	AFF Futsal Championship 2015	Futsal
Gold medal – first place	AFF Futsal Championship 2017	Futsal
Asian Indoor Games
Silver medal – second place	Asian Indoor Games 2009	Futsal
Asian Championship
Silver medal – second place	AFC Futsal Championship 2012	Futsal
- * Club domestic league appearances and goals ‡ National team caps and goals as of 13:05, 23 May 2008 (UTC)

Jetsada Chudech (Thai เจษฎา ชูเดช), is a Thai futsal Forward, and currently a member of Thailand national futsal team.

== Royal decoration ==
- 2015 – Member (Fifth Class) of The Most Admirable Order of the Direkgunabhorn
