= Brunei national futsal team =

National futsal team of Brunei

Brunei Darussalam
- Shirt badge/Association crest
- Nickname(s): Tebuan (Wasps)
- Association: Football Association of Brunei Darussalam
- Confederation: AFC (Asia)
- Head coach: Qusmaini Noor Rusli
- Captain: Khalil Saab
- FIFA code: BRU
- FIFA ranking: 123 (24 September 2026)
Home colours	Away colours

First international
- Brunei 8–8 Philippines (Malaysia; 15 August 1996)

Biggest win
- Brunei 6–1 Laos (Bangkok, Thailand; 29 August 2008); Philippines 0–5 Brunei (Ho Chi Minh City, Vietnam; 30 October 2017)

Biggest defeat
- Brunei 0–22 Thailand (Bangkok, Thailand; 20 April 2012)

FIFA World Cup
- Appearances: None

AFC Futsal Championship
- Appearances: 1 (First in 2002)
- Best result: Round 1 (2002)

AFF Futsal Championship
- Appearances: 16 (First in 2001)
- Best result: 4th place (2001, 2005 and 2008)

The Brunei national futsal team is controlled by the Football Association of Brunei Darussalam, the governing body for futsal in Brunei and represents the country in international futsal competitions.

== Tournaments ==
=== FIFA Futsal World Cup ===
- 1989 – Did not enter
- 1992 – Did not enter
- 1996 – Did not enter
- 2000 – Did not enter
- 2004 – Did not enter
- 2008 – Did not qualify
- 2012 – Did not enter
- 2016 – Did not qualify
- 2021 – Did not qualify
- 2024 – Did not qualify

=== AFC Futsal Championship & Futsal Asian Cup ===
- 1999 - Did not enter
- 2000 - Did not enter
- 2001 - Did not enter
- 2002 – Group stage
- 2003 - Withdrew
- 2004 – Did not enter
- 2005 – Did not enter
- 2006 – Did not enter
- 2007 – Did not enter
- 2008 – Did not qualify
- 2010 – Did not enter
- 2012 – Did not enter
- 2014 – Did not qualify
- 2016 – Did not qualify
- 2018 – Did not qualify
- 2024 – Did not qualify

=== AFF Futsal Championship ===
- 2001 – 4th place
- 2003 – Group stage
- 2005 – 4th place
- 2006 – Group stage
- 2007 – Group stage
- 2008 – 4th place
- 2012 – Group stage
- 2013 – Group stage
- 2014 – Group stage
- 2015 – Group stage
- 2016 – Group stage
- 2017 – Group stage
- 2018 – Group stage
- 2022 – Group stage
- 2024 – Group stage
- 2026 – Group stage

== Results and fixtures ==
2026 ASEAN Futsal Championship

6 April 2026 Group B	Indonesia	7–0	Brunei	Nonthaburi, Thailand
12:30 UTC+07:00	M. Sanjaya 3', 8', 20'; A. Kareth 10', 24'; Imam Anshori 12'; Dewa Rizki 17'			Stadium: Nonthaburi Provincial Administrative Organization Gymnasium; Referee: Benjapol Mucharoensap (Thailand)

7 April 2026 Group B	Brunei	1–13	Australia	Nonthaburi, Thailand
12:30 UTC+07:00	Nazirul 27'		Giovenali 1'; Guerreiro 3'; Harb 6', 14', 14', 28'; Garnham 12', 32'; Rogan 13'; Jafari 17', 39', 40'; Demerutis 18'	Stadium: Nonthaburi Provincial Administrative Organization Gymnasium; Referee: Huỳnh Nguyên Thành (Vietnam)

8 April 2026 Group B	Malaysia	8–4	Brunei	Nonthaburi, Thailand
15:00 UTC+07:00	Faaris Amsyar 4', 5', 22'; Abi 24' (o.g.); Iqbal Hazim 32'; Amirul Syahmi 33'; Aidil Zakwan 37', 38'		Yamin 21'; Abdul Azim 25', 33'; Nazirul 27'	Stadium: Nonthaburi Provincial Administrative Organization Gymnasium; Referee: Panadda Khotsenaphattra (Thailand)

Friendly

8 November 2026	Cambodia	3–0	Brunei	Phnom Penh, Cambodia
	Sichamroeun 6'; Sochetra 21'; Cheatuo 35'			Stadium: National Sports Training Centre

10 November 2026	Cambodia	4–1	Brunei	Phnom Penh, Cambodia
20:30 UTC+7	Chanmony 3'; Sichamroeun 25'; Sochetra 38'; Sobotra 39'		Amirul Haziq 3'	Stadium: National Sports Training Centre

== Players ==
=== Current squad ===
The following players are called up for the friendlies against Cambodia in November 2026.

No.	Pos.	Player	Date of birth (age)	Caps	Club
	GK	Abu Yazid Abu Samah	2 September 1991 (age 35)		(Brunei) MS ABDB
	GK	Khairien Wan Arif Hassan			(Brunei) PES
		Abdul Azim Boll Hassan	15 August 1997 (age 29)		(Brunei) Kasuka & Ar Rawda
		Abi Syarillizam Sabtu	8 November 1994 (age 32)		(Brunei) Kasuka & Ar Rawda
		Amirul Haziq Kamshulzaman	30 November 1999 (age 26)		(Brunei) Almerez
		Amirul Syami Adillah Helmi			(Brunei) Kasuka & Ar Rawda
		Arshrul Irfan Amirrulzam			(Brunei) Kasuka & Ar Rawda
		Harith Hidawi Kamsul			(Brunei) Almerez
		Izzan Syahiran Sharin			(Brunei) Almerez
		Izzan Zamain	29 March 1998 (age 28)		(Brunei) MS ABDB
		Idzzaham Aleshahmezan Metali	5 April 2004 (age 22)		(Brunei) MS ABDB
		Jumatatul Aleshahrezan Metali	15 August 1997 (age 29)		(Brunei) MS ABDB
		Nasy'rul Wafiy Hassan	13 December 1998 (age 27)		(Brunei) Almerez
		Niswad Al-Hakeem Marzuki			(Brunei) PES
		Nur Syafiq Aiman Salmizan Muhaimin			(Brunei) Kasuka & Ar Rawda
		Syahmi Ikhwan Idris	20 October 2004 (age 22)		(Brunei) BSRC

== Coaches ==
- (Brunei) Yunos Yusof (2003)
- (Brunei) Rosanan Samak (2005–2007)
- (Brunei) Yunos Yusof (2008–2014)
- (Brunei) Azmanuddin Gillen (2015)
- (Turkey) Mehmet Fatih Kale (2016)
- (Malaysia) Qusmaini Noor Rusli (2017)
- (Brunei) Yunos Yusof (2017–2018)
- (Brunei) Abdul Azim Zakaria (2022)
- (Indonesia) Wahyu Trianto (2023)
- (Brazil) Rubio Guerra (2024)
- (Malaysia) Qusmaini Noor Rusli (2025–)
