= Bangkokthonburi University =

University in Bangkok, Thailand

- มหาวิทยาลัยกรุงเทพธนบุรี
- Other names: BTU
- Motto: สร้างปัญญา พัฒนาคน ฝึกฝนคุณธรรม
- Motto in English: knowledge, wisdom, and morality
- Type: Private
- Established: 2002
- President: Dr. Bangorn Benjathirkul
- Students: over 10,000 (2016)
- Location: Thawi Watthana, Bangkok, Thailand; 13°46′10″N 100°20′44″E
- Campus: Bangkok
- Website: www.bkkthon.ac.th https://bkkthon-admission.com

Bangkokthonburi University (BTU) is a higher education institute located in Thawi Watthana District, Bangkok, Thailand. Founded in 2002, the college offers undergraduate and graduate studies in business administration, law, political science, science, education and medicine.

== History ==
BTU offers higher education for nearly 30 years ever since the establishment of Bangkok Vocational and Business College in 1987. Later, a series of new colleges were established, which were Bangkok Poly Techniques (1997), Bangkok Business Administration School (1999), Bangkokthonburi College (2002), and Bangkokthonburi University (2009). Bangkokthonburi University (BTU) was established as Bangkokthonburi College by Bangorn Benjathirkul on January 28, 2003.

BTU has contains four major functions, which are teaching and learning, conducting research, providing educational services to the public, and maintaining and preserving arts and cultural heritages. BTU is recognized as a leading institution of higher learning in Thailand.

== Academic programs ==
Using Thai as the language of instruction, Bangkok University awards bachelor's degrees, master's degrees, and doctoral degrees.

== Notable alumni ==
- Aphaphorn Nakhonsawan, Thai women singer

== See also ==
- Faculty of Medicine, Bangkokthonburi University
- List of universities in Thailand
