= 2001 AFF Futsal Championship =

2001 ASEAN Futsal Championship
Tournament details
- Host country: Malaysia
- City: Selangor
- Dates: 7–9 June 2001
- Teams: 5

Final positions
- Champions: Thailand (1st title)
- Runners-up: Singapore
- Third place: Malaysia
- Fourth place: Brunei

Tournament statistics
- Matches played: 11
- Goals scored: 118 (10.73 per match)

The 2001 AFF Futsal Championship is the first edition of the tournament which will be held in Selangor, Malaysia from 7 to 9 June 2001.

From the start of the tournament, Thailand looked like they had a chance to win the title and eventually won the title after winning all 4 matches in the group stage and a convincing 12–1 victory over Singapore in the final.

== Championship ==
=== Group stage ===
The five teams played one another over three days, with the top two advancing to the final.

Teams	GP	W	D	L	GF	GA	Pts
Thailand	4	4	0	0	50	4	12
Singapore	4	2	0	2	8	14	6
Malaysia	4	2	0	2	16	23	6
Brunei	4	1	0	3	15	28	3
Philippines	4	1	0	3	16	34	3

1. Thailand 10 – 1 Singapore
2. Thailand 12 – 0 Malaysia
3. Thailand 14 – 2 Brunei
4. Thailand 14 – 3 Philippines
5. Malaysia 0 – 3 Singapore
6. Brunei 0 – 3 Singapore
7. Philippines 4 – 1 Singapore
8. Malaysia 7 – 4 Brunei
9. Malaysia 9 – 4 Philippines
10. Brunei 9 – 5 Philippines

=== Final ===
9 June 2001
20:00 (TST)

Thailand	12–1	Singapore

Malawati Indoor Stadium
Shah Alam, Malaysia

== Champions ==
2001 AFF Futsal Championship winners

Thailand
1st title
