= Jirawat Sornwichian =

Thai futsal player

Personal information
- Full name: Jirawat Sornwichian
- Date of birth: 23 October 1988 (age 38)
- Place of birth: Ranong, Thailand
- Height: 1.72 m (5 ft 7 1/2 in)
- Position: Defender

Team information
- Current team: Thammasat Stallion
- Number: 8

Youth career
- 2002–2007: Phichai Rattanakhan School

Senior career*
Years	Team	Apps	(Gls)
2008	CAT Telecom Futsal Club	14	(8)
2009	Chonburi Bluewave	8	(1)
2010	Bangkok Futsal Club	17	(10)
2011–2012	Surat Thani Futsal Club	28	(26)
2013–2021	Chonburi Bluewave	80	(74)
2021-2023	Black Pearl United	36	(17)
2024-	Thammasat Stallion	0	(0)

International career^{‡}
2008–	Thailand Futsal	70	(66)
Medal record
Thailand national Futsal team
Sea Games
Gold medal – first place	2011 Southeast Asian Games	Futsal
AFF Futsal Championship
Gold medal – first place	AFF Futsal Championship 2008	Futsal
Gold medal – first place	AFF Futsal Championship 2009	Futsal
Gold medal – first place	AFF Futsal Championship 2012	Futsal
Asian Indoor Games
Silver medal – second place	Asian Indoor Games 2009	Futsal
Asian Championship
Silver medal – second place	AFC Futsal Championship 2012	Futsal
Silver medal – second place	AFC Futsal Championship 2024	Futsal
- * Club domestic league appearances and goals ‡ National team caps and goals as of 13:05, 23 May 2008 (UTC)

Jirawat Sornwichian (Thai จิรวัฒน์ สอนวิเชียร), is a Thai futsal Defender, and currently a member of Thailand national futsal team.

== Honours ==
=== Chonburi Blue Wave ===
- Thailand Futsal League
  - Winners (5) 2009, 2012–2013, 2014, 2015, 2016

=== Continental ===
- AFC Futsal Club Championship
  - Winners (2): 2013, 2017

=== International ===
Thailand

- AFC Futsal Championship
  - Runners up (1): 2012, 2024
  - Third place (1): 2016
- Asian Indoor Games
  - Runners up (1): 2009
  - Third place (1): 2013
- AFF Futsal Championship
  - Winners (6): 2008, 2009, 2012, 2013, 2014, 2015
- Southeast Asian Games
  - Winners (2): 2011, 2013

=== Individual ===
- 2016 AFC Futsal Club Championship Top Scorer 7 goals
- 2017 AFC Futsal Club Championship Top Scorer 9 goals

Sporting positions
Preceded by (Iran) Vahid Shamsaei	AFC Futsal Club Championship Top Scorers; 2016 (7 Goals); 2017 (9 Goals)	Succeeded by (Iran) Mahdi Javid
