= 2014 AFC Futsal Championship =

Giải vô địch bóng đá trong nhà châu Á 2014

Tournament details
- Host country: Vietnam
- Dates: 30 April – 10 May
- Teams: 16 (from 1 confederation)
- Venues: 2 (in 1 host city)

Final positions
- Champions: Japan (3rd title)
- Runners-up: Iran
- Third place: Uzbekistan
- Fourth place: Kuwait

Tournament statistics
- Matches played: 32
- Goals scored: 221 (6.91 per match)
- Top scorer(s): (Iran) Hossein Tayyebi (15 goals)
- Best player: (Iran) Ali Asghar Hassanzadeh
- Fair play award: Japan

The 2014 AFC Futsal Championship was held in Vietnam from 30 April to 10 May 2014. 16 countries took part in the 13th edition of the tournament. Japan won the championship and successfully defended their title from the 2012 AFC Futsal Championship.

== Qualified teams ==
Team	Qualified as	Qualification date	Appearance in finals
Japan	2012 AFC Futsal Championship Winners	30 May 2012	13th
Thailand	2012 AFC Futsal Championship Runners-up	30 May 2012	13th
Iran	2012 AFC Futsal Championship Third place	1 June 2012	13th
Vietnam	Hosts and ASEAN Zone Third place	31 August 2013	3rd
Chinese Taipei	East Zone Runners-Up	6 October 2013	10th
China	East Zone Winner	6 October 2013	10th
South Korea	East Zone Third place	7 October 2013	12th
Indonesia	ASEAN Zone Fourth place	22 October 2013	9th
Australia	ASEAN Zone Runners-up	22 October 2013	6th
Malaysia	ASEAN Zone Fifth place	23 October 2013	10th
Uzbekistan	South & Central Group Winner	6 November 2013	13th
Tajikistan	South & Central Group Runners-up	7 November 2013	8th
Kyrgyzstan	South & Central Group Third place	7 November 2013	13th
Lebanon	West Group Winners	11 December 2013	9th
Kuwait	West Group Runners-up	11 December 2013	11th
Iraq	West Group Third place	12 December 2013	9th

== Venues ==
Ho Chi Minh City
Phu Tho Gymnasium	Ton Duc Thang University Gymnasium
Capacity: 5,000	Capacity: 2,700

== Draw ==
The 16 teams were drawn into four groups of four teams. The teams were seeded according to their performance in the previous season in 2012.

Pot 1	Pot 2	Pot 3	Pot 4
1. Vietnam (hosts); 2. Japan; 3. Thailand; 4. Iran	5. Australia; 6. Kuwait; 7. Kyrgyzstan; 8. Lebanon	9. Uzbekistan; 10. China; 11. Tajikistan; 12. Chinese Taipei	13. Indonesia; 14. South Korea; 15. Iraq; 16. Malaysia

== Group stage ==
If two or more teams are equal on points on completion of the group matches, the following criteria were applied to determine the rankings.

1. Greater number of points obtained in the group matches between the teams concerned;
2. Goal difference resulting from the group matches between the teams concerned;
3. Greater number of goals scored in the group matches between the teams concerned;
4. Goal difference in all the group matches;
5. Greater number of goals scored in all the group matches;
6. Kicks from the penalty mark if only two teams are involved and they are both on the field of play;
7. Fewer score calculated according to the number of yellow and red cards received in the group matches;
8. Drawing of lots.

All times are local (UTC+7).

=== Group A ===
Pos	Team	Pld	W	D	L	GF	GA	GD	Pts
1	Kuwait	3	2	0	1	11	5	+6	6
2	Vietnam (H)	3	2	0	1	13	7	+6	6
3	Iraq	3	2	0	1	11	7	+4	6
4	Tajikistan	3	0	0	3	5	21	−16	0

(H) Hosts
30 April 2014
16:00

Kuwait	5–0	Tajikistan
Hamad 3', 22'; Al Tawail 13', 38', 39'	Report

Phu Tho Gymnasium, Ho Chi Minh City
Referee: Zhang Youze (China, P.R.)
30 April 2014
19:00

Vietnam	1–2	Iraq
Al-Zubaidi 25' (o.g.)	Report	Abed 22'; Fahem 40'

Phu Tho Gymnasium, Ho Chi Minh City

2 May 2014
16:00

Iraq	3–5	Kuwait
Hwede 18'; Fahem 34'; Al Thabeti 35'	Report	Ahmad 2'; Altawail 16', 29', 30'; Almosabehi 25'

Phu Tho Gymnasium, Ho Chi Minh City
2 May 2014
18:30

Tajikistan	4–10	Vietnam
Makhmudov 11', 28'; Mamedbabaev 17'; Jumaev 17'	Report	Trần Văn Vũ 10'; Phùng Trọng Luân 12', 27'; Ngô Ngọc Sơn 13', 27'; Lê Quốc Nam 15'; Phạm Đức Hòa 16'; Nguyễn Bảo Quân 25', 33'; Lý Khánh Hưng 37'

Phu Tho Gymnasium, Ho Chi Minh City

4 May 2014
18:30

Vietnam	2–1	Kuwait
Ahmad 18' (o.g.); Phùng Trọng Luân 24'	Report	Almosabehi 40'

Phu Tho Gymnasium, Ho Chi Minh City
4 May 2014
18:30

Tajikistan	1–6	Iraq
Makhmudov 13'	Report	Hamzah 1', 24'; Hasan 15', 28'; Fahem 27'; Al Thabeti 35'

Ton Duc Thang University Gymnasium, Ho Chi Minh City

=== Group B ===
Pos	Team	Pld	W	D	L	GF	GA	GD	Pts
1	Iran	3	3	0	0	25	2	+23	9
2	Australia	3	2	0	1	8	9	−1	6
3	Indonesia	3	1	0	2	5	13	−8	3
4	China	3	0	0	3	4	18	−14	0

30 April 2004
16:00

Iran	5–1	Indonesia
Tayebi 8'; Tavakoli 17', 17'; Hassanzadeh 18'; Shafiei 38'	Report	Kustiawan 30'

Ton Duc Thang University Gymnasium, Ho Chi Minh City
Attendance: 650
Referee: Tomohiro Kozaki (Japan)
30 April 2004
19:00

Australia	2–1	China
Seeto 6', 39'	Report	Zhang Wen 3'

Ton Duc Thang University Gymnasium, Ho Chi Minh City

2 May 2014
16:00

Indonesia	0–5	Australia
	Report	Giovenali 14' de Moraes 20'; Giovenali 38'; Seeto 39'; Fogarty 40'

Ton Duc Thang University Gymnasium, Ho Chi Minh City
Referee: HIROYUKI KOBAYASHI(Japan)
2 May 2014
18:30

China	0–12	Iran
	Report	Tayebi 1', 12', 27', 35'; Tavakoli 5'; Hassanzadeh 1', 2', 25'; Shafiei 10', 28'; Fakhim 24'; Ahmadi 40'

Ton Duc Thang University Gymnasium, Ho Chi Minh City

4 May 2014
16:00

Iran	8–1	Australia
Tayebi 2', 10', 11'; Taheri 10', 29'; Vafaei 15'; Shafiei 17'; Esmaeilpour 28'	Report	Daniel Fogarty 7'

Phu Tho Gymnasium, Ho Chi Minh City
4 May 2014
16:00

China	3–4	Indonesia
Zhao Liang 9'; Wang Tianyi 11'; Agustin 40' (o.g.)	Report	Kustiawan 3', 30'; Silitonga 12', 36'

Ton Duc Thang University Gymnasium, Ho Chi Minh City

=== Group C ===
Pos	Team	Pld	W	D	L	GF	GA	GD	Pts
1	Thailand	3	2	1	0	15	6	+9	7
2	Lebanon	3	1	1	1	12	13	−1	4
3	Chinese Taipei	3	1	0	2	10	15	−5	3
4	Malaysia	3	1	0	2	8	11	−3	3

1 May 2014
16:00

Thailand	7–1	Malaysia
Sornwichian 11', 12'; Thueanklang 26', 29', 36'; Thaijaroen 31'; Alwee 39' (o.g.)	Report	Amir 11'

Phu Tho Gymnasium, Ho Chi Minh City
Attendance: 350
Referee: Vahid Arzpeyma Mohamareh (Iran)
1 May 2014
18:30

Lebanon	8–5	Chinese Taipei
Serhan 2'; Tneich 17', 23'; Kobeissy 23', 23', 39'; Kheir El Dine 28'; Zeitoun 35'	Report	Chu Chia-wei 9'; Liu Chi-chao 11'; Huang Cheng-tsung 18', 19'; Lo Chih-en 27'

Phu Tho Gymnasium, Ho Chi Minh City
Attendance: 150
Referee: Chris Colley (Australia)

3 May 2014
16:00

Malaysia	5–1	Lebanon
Akmar 1', 23'; Nizam 5', 11'; Aula 34'	Report	Tneich 16'

Phu Tho Gymnasium, Ho Chi Minh City
3 May 2014
18:30

Chinese Taipei	2–5	Thailand
Lo Chih-an 24'; Huang Cheng-tsung 33'	Report	Thueanklang 3'; Chudech 4'; Rattana 8'; Wongkaeo 24'; Sornwichian 33'

Phu Tho Gymnasium, Ho Chi Minh City
Attendance: 200
Referee: HASAN MOHAMMED MOUSA AL-GBUR (IRAQ)

5 May 2014
16:00

Thailand	3–3	Lebanon
Wongkaeo 21'; Thueanklang 33', 40'	Report	Tneich 1'; Zaid 17', 40'

Phu Tho Gymnasium, Ho Chi Minh City
Attendance: 200
Referee: ZHANG YOUZE (CHINA PR)
5 May 2014
16:00

Chinese Taipei	3–2	Malaysia
Chang Hao-wei 14'; Huang Cheng-tsung 17'; Weng Wei-pin 26'	Report	Amir 20'; Yatim 29'

Ton Duc Thang University Gymnasium, Ho Chi Minh City

=== Group D ===
Pos	Team	Pld	W	D	L	GF	GA	GD	Pts
1	Uzbekistan	3	2	1	0	7	3	+4	7
2	Japan	3	2	0	1	17	2	+15	6
3	Kyrgyzstan	3	1	1	1	6	7	−1	4
4	South Korea	3	0	0	3	1	19	−18	0

1 May 2014
16:00

Japan	12–0	South Korea
Nibuya 3', 35'; Osodo 6', 20', 31'; Nakamura 16', 33', 38'; Minamoto 29'; Uchimura 31'; Sato 36'; Morioka 39'	Report

Ton Duc Thang University Gymnasium, Ho Chi Minh City
Attendance: 700
Referee: Saša Tomić (Croatia)
1 May 2014
18:30

Kyrgyzstan	2–2	Uzbekistan
Ryskulov 38'; Kanetov 39'	Report	Tabaldiev 5' (o.g.); Abdumavlyanov 17'

Ton Duc Thang University Gymnasium, Ho Chi Minh City

3 May 2014
16:00

South Korea	1–4	Kyrgyzstan
Shin Jong-hoon 32'	Report	Ermekov 17', 27'; Duvanaev 37'; Kondratkov 40'

Ton Duc Thang University Gymnasium, Ho Chi Minh City
3 May 2014
18:30

Uzbekistan	2–1	Japan
Shlema 10'; Yunusov 40'	Report	Nishitani 9'

Ton Duc Thang University Gymnasium, Ho Chi Minh City
Attendance: 900
Referee: Trương Quốc Dũng (Vietnam)

5 May 2014
18:30

Japan	4–0	Kyrgyzstan
Minamoto 4'; Nibuya 9'; Osodo 17', 35'	Report

Phu Tho Gymnasium, Ho Chi Minh City
Attendance: 200
Referee: Scott Kidson (Australia)
5 May 2014
18:30

Uzbekistan	3–0	South Korea
Shuhrat 16'; Choriev 34'; Dilshod 39'	Report

Ton Duc Thang University Gymnasium, Ho Chi Minh City

== Knockout stage ==
In the knockout stage, extra time and penalty shoot-out are used to decide the winner if necessary (no extra time is used in the third place match).

Quarter-finals
May 7 – Ho Chi Minh City
Kuwait	5
Australia	2
May 7 – Ho Chi Minh City
Thailand	2
Japan	3
May 7 – Ho Chi Minh City
Iran	15
Vietnam	4
May 7 – Ho Chi Minh City
Uzbekistan	6
Lebanon	2

Semi-finals
May 8 – Ho Chi Minh City
Kuwait	1
Japan	6
May 8 – Ho Chi Minh City
Iran	10
Uzbekistan	0

Final
May 10 – Ho Chi Minh City
Japan	2(3)
Iran	2(0)
Third place
May 10 – Ho Chi Minh City
Kuwait	1
Uzbekistan	2

=== Quarter-finals ===
7 May 2014
15:30

Kuwait	5–2	Australia
Hamad 21', 32'; Altawail 29'; Abdulrahman 32', 34'	Report	Tobias Seeto 32'; Jarrod Basger 28'

Phu Tho Gymnasium, Ho Chi Minh City

7 May 2014
15:30

Thailand	2–3	Japan
Suphawut 20'; Jirawat 25'	Report	Nibuya 7'; Osodo 14'; Morioka 36'

Ton Duc Thang University Gymnasium, Ho Chi Minh City
Attendance: 1,000
Referee: Mohamad Chami (Lebanon)

7 May 2014
18:30

Iran	15–4	Vietnam
Tayyebi 2', 10', 24'; Fakhim 11', 36', 38'; Esmaeilpour 12'; Vafaei 17', 36'; Hassanzadeh 25', 26', 28'; Shajari 29', 32'; Jafari 30'	Report	Phùng Trọng Luân 12', 29'; Lý Khánh Hưng 22'; Pham Thành Đạt 33'

Phu Tho Gymnasium, Ho Chi Minh City

7 May 2014
18:30

Uzbekistan	6–2	Lebanon
Andrey 10'; Dilshod 25', 32'; Shuhrat 26'; Artur 30'; Farkhod 30'	Report	Kheir El Dine 38'; Moustafa Serhan 40'

Ton Duc Thang University Gymnasium, Ho Chi Minh City

=== Semi-finals ===
8 May 2014
15:30

Kuwait	1–6	Japan
Mohammad 15'	Report	Inaba 5', 22'; Minamoto 21'; Osodo 24', 27'; Hoshi 29'

Phu Tho Gymnasium, Ho Chi Minh City
Attendance: 350
Referee: Fernando Lumbreras (Spain)

8 May 2014
18:30

Iran	10–0	Uzbekistan
Tayyebi 5', 24', 28'; Shafiei 10', 23', 31'; Vafaei 1'; Hassanzadeh 5'; Esmaeilpour 7'; Shajari 30'	Report

Phu Tho Gymnasium, Ho Chi Minh City

=== Third place play-off ===
10 May 2014
16:00

Kuwait	1–2	Uzbekistan
Alwadhi 35'	Report	Dilshod 11'; Farkhod 34'

Phu Tho Gymnasium, Ho Chi Minh City

=== Final ===
10 May 2014
19:00

Japan	2–2 (a.e.t.)	Iran
Inaba 26'; Ahmadi 46' (o.g.)	Report	Tavakoli 8'; Tayyebi 43'
Penalties
Nibuya (penalty scored); Yoshikawa (penalty scored); Minamoto (penalty scored)	3–0	(penalty missed) Taheri; (penalty missed) Bahadori; (penalty missed) Hassanzadeh

Phu Tho Gymnasium, Ho Chi Minh City
Attendance: 2,000
Referee: Nurdin Bukuev (Kyrgyzstan)

== Goalscorers ==
15 goals

- (Iran) Hossein Tayyebi

8 goals

- (Iran) Ali Asghar Hassanzadeh
- (Japan) Nobuya Osodo

7 goals

- (Iran) Vahid Shafiei
- (Thailand) Suphawut Thueanklang

== Awards ==
The following awards were given at the conclusion of the tournament:

Top Goalscorer	Most Valuable Player	Fair Play award
(Iran) Hossein Tayyebi	(Iran) Ali Asghar Hassanzadeh	Japan
