= Philippines national futsal team =

Philippines
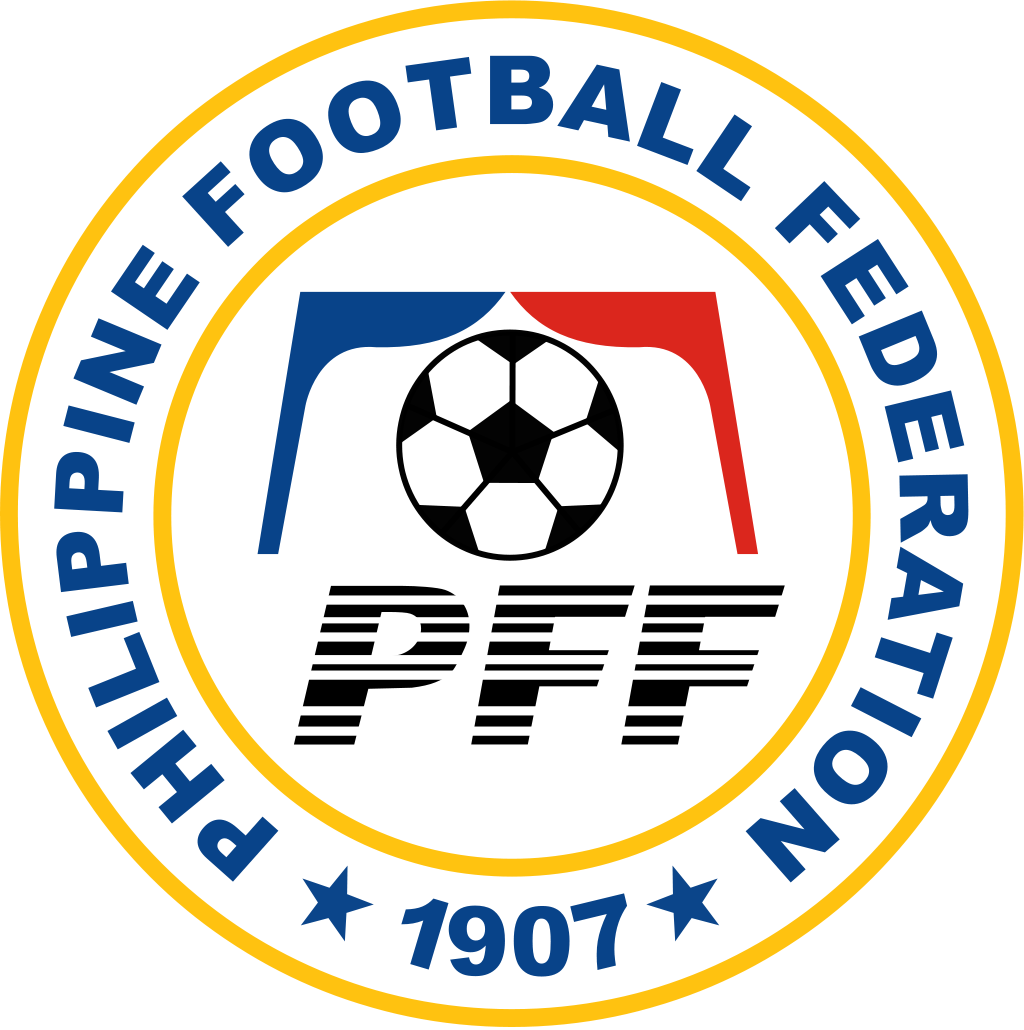
- Shirt badge/Association crest
- Association: Philippine Football Federation
- Confederation: AFC (Asia)
- FIFA ranking: NR (May 8, 2026)
- Highest FIFA ranking: 91 (August 29, 2025)
Home colors	Away colors

First international
- Philippines 8–8 Brunei (Kuala Lumpur, Malaysia; 15 August 1996)

Biggest win
- Philippines 10–2 Timor-Leste (Ho Chi Minh City, Vietnam; 9 June 2009)

Biggest defeat
- Myanmar 25–0 Philippines (Ho Chi Minh City, Vietnam; 28 October 2017)

FIFA World Cup
- Appearances: None

Asian Cup
- Appearances: 3 (First in 2004)
- Best result: Round 1 (2004, 2005 and 2007)

ASEAN Championship
- Appearances: 12 (First in 2001)
- Best result: Fourth place (2009 and 2010)

The Philippines national futsal team represented the Philippines in various international futsal competitions under the Philippine Football Federation and is affiliated with the Asian Football Confederation. It is currently an inactive team.

== History ==
An informal form of futsal was being played in the Philippines as early as the 1960s to the 1980s, usually as part of a cross training for footballers during rainy weather. It was only in the late 1990s, that official futsal international tournaments were held and during this time the Philippine national team is already playing international friendlies under coaches Noel Casilao and Hans Smit.

By 2020, there is no active men's national team. The Philippine Football Federation (PFF) brought in Victor Hermans as technical director of futsal to develop youth futsal with a later goal to develop "a more potent national team at the senior level." The 2024–2025 report by the PFF released in January 2026, pledged the formation of a men's national team.

== Competition records ==
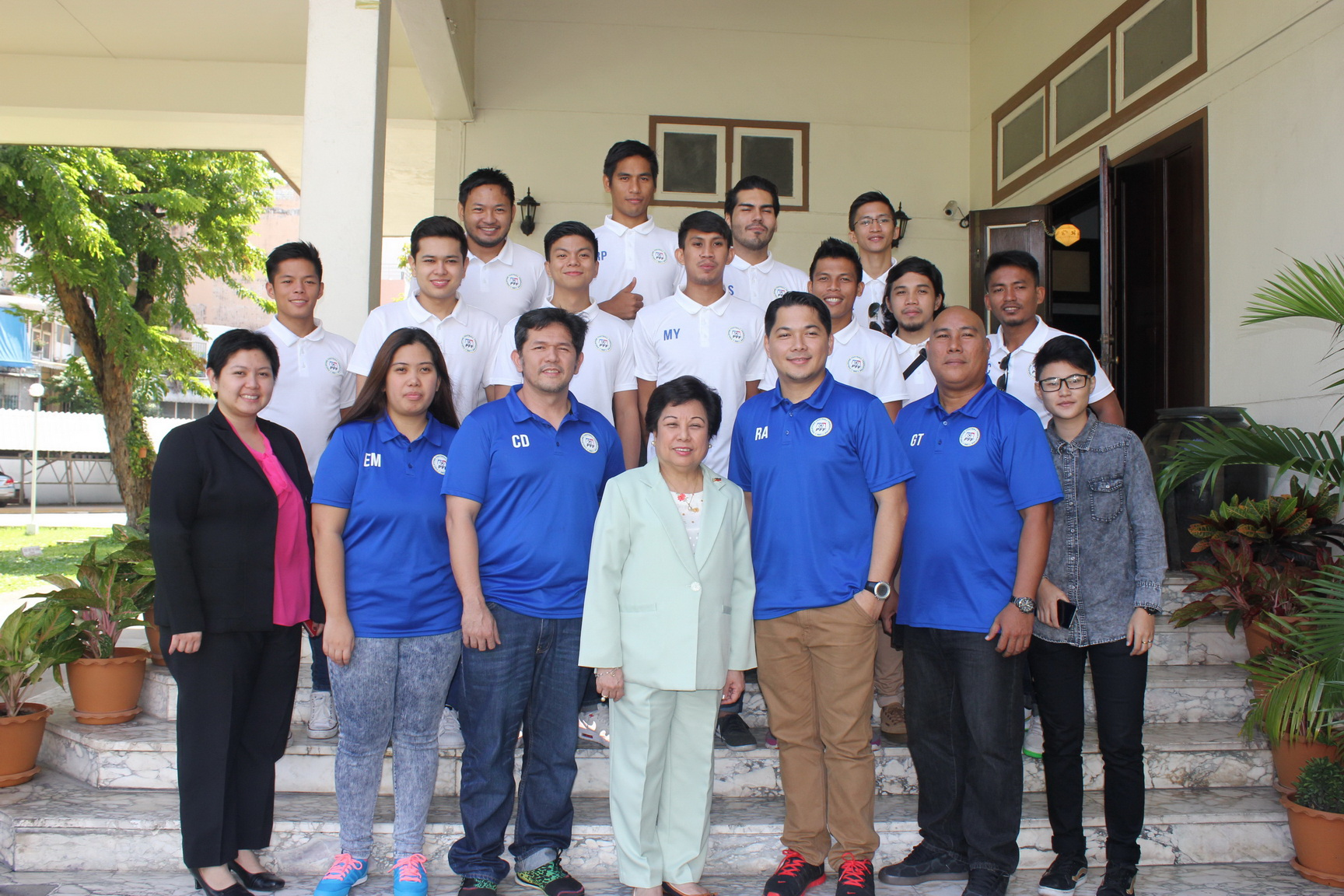
Players and staff of the national team that competed at the 2016 AFC Futsal Championship qualifiers in Bangkok along with Philippine ambassador to Thailand, Mary Jo A. Bernardo-Aragon.

=== FIFA Futsal World Cup ===
- 1989 to 1992 – Did not enter
- 1996 – Did not qualify
- 2000 – Did not enter
- 2004 – Did not qualify
- 2008 – Did not enter
- 2012 to 2016 – Did not qualify
- 2021 – Did not enter
- 2024 – Did not enter

=== AFC Futsal Asian Cup ===
- 1999 to 2003 – Did not enter
- 2004 to 2005 – Group stage
- 2006 – Did not enter
- 2007 – Group stage
- 2008 – Did not enter
- 2010 to 2016 – Did not qualify
- 2018 – Did not enter
- 2020 – Did not enter
- 2022 – Did not enter
- 2024 – Did not enter

=== Asian Indoor and Martial Arts Games ===
- 2005 – Withdrew
- 2007 – Did not enter
- 2009 – Did not enter
- 2013 – Did not enter
- 2017 – Did not enter

=== ASEAN Futsal Championship ===
- 2001 to 2005 – Group stage
- 2006 – Did not enter
- 2007 to 2008 – Group stage
- 2009 to 2010 – Fourth place
- 2011 – Cancelled
- 2012 to 2015 – Group stage
- 2016 – Did not enter
- 2017 – Group stage
- 2018 – Withdrew
- 2019 – Did not enter
- 2022 – Did not enter
- 2024 – Did not enter

=== Southeast Asian Games ===
- 2007 – Group stage
- 2011 – Group stage
- 2013 to 2025– Did not enter

== Coaches ==
- (Iran) Esmaeil Sedigh (2007–2012)
- (Philippines) Baltazar Avelino (2013–2016)
- (Philippines) Christian Dominquez (2017)

== See also ==
- Philippine Futsal League
- Futsal in the Philippines
