= Futsal at the 2013 Asian Indoor and Martial Arts Games =

- Venue: Songdo Global University Gymnasium; Dongbu Students Gymnasium
- Dates: 26 June – 6 July 2013

Futsal for the 2013 Asian Indoor and Martial Arts Games was held in two venues, at the Songdo Global Campus, and the Dongbu Students Gymnasium. Matches took place from 26 June to 6 July 2013, with a break on 2 July.

== Medalists ==
Event	Gold	Silver	Bronze
Men	Iran; Alireza Samimi; Taha Mortazavi; Vahid Shafiei; Mohammad Keshavarz; Meisam Khayyam; Alireza Vafaei; Ali Asghar Hassanzadeh; Ghodrat Bahadori; Hossein Tayyebi; Mohammad Taheri; Ali Kiaei; Sepehr Mohammadi; Farhad Tavakkoli; Mehdi Javid	Japan; Toru Fukimbara; Shunta Uchimura; Satoshi Tanno; Toru Sato; Manabu Takita; Tomoaki Watanabe; Rafael Henmi; Yoshifumi Nagai; Taiki Seike; Kazuhiro Nibuya; Yushi Sekiguchi; Tomoki Yoshikawa; Akira Minamoto; Ryosuke Nishitani	Thailand; Prakit Dankhuntod; Asming Talek; Kongla Lekkla; Piyapan Rattana; Chaivat Jamgrajang; Jirawat Sornwichian; Kritsada Wongkaeo; Jetsada Chudech; Suphawut Thueanklang; Apiwat Chaemcharoen; Nattawut Madyalan; Sakchai Hamaitree; Nawin Rattanawongswas; Piyanat Nusaya
Women	Japan; Mayo Akimoto; Yuki Saita; Haruna Kitazumi; Kana Shibahara; Natsumi Koide; Misato Ino; Chikage Kichibayashi; Mutsumi Sakata; Minako Sekinada; Shiori Nakajima; Kana Kitagawa; Sakae Honda; Minae Aoyama; Yumiko Shinomiya	Iran; Farzaneh Tavassoli; Paria Norouzi; Nasimeh Gholami; Fereshteh Karimi; Soheila Malmoli; Sepideh Zarinrad; Leila Eghbali; Niloufar Ardalan; Fahimeh Zareei; Fatemeh Etedadi; Nastaran Moghimi; Arezoo Sadaghianizadeh; Naghmeh Moradi; Behnaz Khayyat	Thailand; Sasiprapha Suksen; Pannipa Juijaroen; Pavinee Netthip; Kanyarat Karapakdee; Hataichanok Tappakun; Jiraprapa Tupsuri; Pacharaporn Srimuang; Orathai Srimanee; Nipaporn Sriwarom; Siranya Srimanee; Prapasporn Sriroj; Pannipa Kamolrat; Darika Peanpailun; Sasicha Phothiwong

== Medal table ==
Rank	Nation	Gold	Silver	Bronze	Total
1	Iran (IRI)	1	1	0	2
1	Japan (JPN)	1	1	0	2
3	Thailand (THA)	0	0	2	2
Totals (3 entries)		2	2	2	6

== Results ==
=== Men ===
==== Group stage ====
===== Group A =====
Pos	Team	Pld	W	D	L	GF	GA	GD	Pts
1	Kuwait	3	3	0	0	14	5	+9	9
2	South Korea	3	2	0	1	19	7	+12	6
3	Hong Kong	3	0	1	2	5	13	−8	1
4	Macau	3	0	1	2	3	16	−13	1

Source: Futsal Planet
26 June
16:00

Kuwait	4–2	Hong Kong
Al-Wadi 22'; Al-Mosabehi 23'; Hayat 32'; Al-Awadhi 32'		So Sheung Kwai 3', 12'

Songdo Global University Gymnasium, Incheon
Referee: Tomohiro Kozaki (Japan)

26 June
18:30

South Korea	9–1	Macau
Kim Ho-jin 24'; Kim Gyeong-geun 26', 33'; Seo Dae-yun 36', 36'; Chan Pak Chun 36' (o.g.); Leong Chong In 37' (o.g.); Lee Jeong-jin 38'; Lee Min-yong 40'		Cheang 28'

Songdo Global University Gymnasium, Incheon
Referee: Shukhrat Pulatov (Uzbekistan)

28 June
16:00

Macau	0–5	Kuwait
		Al-Awadhi 4', 22'; Al-Kandari 10'; Al-Mutairi 25'; Al-Farsi 36'

Songdo Global University Gymnasium, Incheon
Referee: Rey Ritaga (Philippines)

28 June
18:30

Hong Kong	1–7	South Korea
Li Hang Wui 13'		Kim Gyeong-geun 26'; Kim Ho-jin 28'; Lee Jeong-won 30'; Lee Min-yong 32', 32' (pen.); Kim Min-kuk 34'; Leung Hing Kit 36' (o.g.)

Songdo Global University Gymnasium, Incheon
Referee: Scott Kidson (Australia)

30 June
18:30

South Korea	3–5	Kuwait
Kim Min-kuk 7'; Al-Mosabehi 21' (o.g.); Lee Jeong-won 27'		Al-Mosabehi 8', 12', 22', 27'; Al-Wadi 17'

Songdo Global University Gymnasium, Incheon
Referee: Nurdin Bukuev (Kyrgyzstan)

30 June
18:30

Hong Kong	2–2	Macau
Li Hang Wui 22'; Chow Ka Wa 39'		Cheang 9'; Chan Man Hou 14'

Dongbu Students Gymnasium, Incheon
Referee: Rey Ritaga (Philippines)

===== Group B =====
Pos	Team	Pld	W	D	L	GF	GA	GD	Pts
1	Thailand	2	2	0	0	33	2	+31	6
2	Malaysia	2	1	0	1	17	4	+13	3
3	Bhutan	2	0	0	2	1	45	−44	0

Source: Futsal Planet
26 June
16:00

Thailand	29–1	Bhutan
Wongkaeo 1', 2', 8', 9', 21'; Thueanklang 3', 3', 12', 24', 29', 37'; Jamgrajang 6'; Chudech 6', 27'; Madyalan 7', 13', 32', 40'; Chaemcharoen 14', 28', 34'; Rattanawongswas 17', 24', 25', 40'; Lekkla 20', 30'; Sornwichian 21'; Nusaya 29'		D. Dhendup 1'

Dongbu Students Gymnasium, Incheon
Referee: Nurdin Bukuev (Kyrgyzstan)

28 June
16:00

Malaysia	16–0	Bhutan
Hadzir 2', 11', 18', 34', 40'; Zahari 3'; Zamri 5', 12', 23' (pen.); Tahar 20', 28', 29'; Fadzil 25'; Hasan 33'; Kadir 34'; Bahrin 35'

Dongbu Students Gymnasium, Incheon
Referee: Husein Khalaileh (Jordan)

30 June
16:00

Thailand	4–1	Malaysia
Wongkaeo 10', 31', 35'; Chudech 28'		Hadzir 3'

Songdo Global University Gymnasium, Incheon
Referee: Mohamad Chami (Lebanon)

===== Group C =====
Pos	Team	Pld	W	D	L	GF	GA	GD	Pts
1	Lebanon	2	1	1	0	11	4	+7	4
2	Vietnam	2	1	1	0	4	1	+3	4
3	Palestine	2	0	0	2	5	15	−10	0

Source: Futsal Planet
26 June
18:30

Lebanon	11–4	Palestine
Tneich 6', 9', 40'; Takaji 8'; El-Homsi 10', 33'; Ezzeddine 16', 17'; Abou Zeid 23'; Kawsan 24'; Kobeissy 40'		Abuhasanein 14'; Abuyousef 20'; Fahjan 20', 27'

Dongbu Students Gymnasium, Incheon
Referee: Kim Jang-kwan (South Korea)

28 June
18:30

Vietnam	4–1	Palestine
Trần Văn Vũ 9', 16'; Lưu Quỳnh Toàn 16'; Ngô Anh Dũng 30'		Al-Sbakhi 19'

Dongbu Students Gymnasium, Incheon
Referee: Kim Jong-hee (South Korea)

30 June
16:00

Lebanon	0–0	Vietnam

Dongbu Students Gymnasium, Incheon
Referee: Yasukazu Nobumoto (Japan)

===== Group D =====
Pos	Team	Pld	W	D	L	GF	GA	GD	Pts
1	Iran	2	2	0	0	25	3	+22	6
2	United Arab Emirates	2	1	0	1	3	15	−12	3
3	Iraq	2	0	0	2	5	15	−10	0

Source: Futsal Planet
27 June
16:00

Iran	13–0	United Arab Emirates
Taheri 3', 3', 24'; Tayyebi 8', 40', 40'; Javid 10', 20', 25'; Kiaei 16'; Hassanzadeh 20'; Bahadori 21', 40'

Songdo Global University Gymnasium, Incheon
Referee: Yasukazu Nobumoto (Japan)

29 June
11:00

Iraq	2–3	United Arab Emirates
Khalid 23'; Abd-Ali 40'		Al-Marzouqi 20', 40'; Banihammad 37'

Songdo Global University Gymnasium, Incheon
Referee: Tomohiro Kozaki (Japan)

1 July
16:00

Iran	12–3	Iraq
Hassanzadeh 10', 12'; Shafiei 16', 16'; Kiaei 21', 39'; Taheri 24', 30'; Tayyebi 26', 28'; Vafaei 31'; Bahadori 34'		Jabbar 10'; Khalid 26', 38'

Songdo Global University Gymnasium, Incheon
Referee: Tomohiro Kozaki (Japan)

===== Group E =====
Pos	Team	Pld	W	D	L	GF	GA	GD	Pts
1	China	2	2	0	0	10	3	+7	6
2	Indonesia	2	1	0	1	10	7	+3	3
3	Chinese Taipei	2	0	0	2	2	12	−10	0

Source: Futsal Planet
27 June
18:30

China	5–0	Chinese Taipei
Chen Sung-nan 4' (o.g.); Deng Tao 10'; Hu Jie 23'; Gu Haitao 30', 38'

Songdo Global University Gymnasium, Incheon
Referee: Scott Kidson (Australia)

29 June
13:30

Indonesia	7–2	Chinese Taipei
Saptaji 1', 2', 35'; Kustiawan 9'; Agustin 28'; Purnomo 37'; Hafid 40'		Pan Wen-chieh 25'; Liu Chi-chao 29'

Songdo Global University Gymnasium, Incheon
Referee: Musab Al-Rashoud (Kuwait)

1 July
18:30

China	5–3	Indonesia
Deng Tao 21', 34'; Hu Jie 32', 39'; Liang Shuang 34'		Mushar 23', 37'; Saptaji 32'

Songdo Global University Gymnasium, Incheon
Referee: Mahmoud Reza Nassirloo (Iran)

===== Group F =====
Pos	Team	Pld	W	D	L	GF	GA	GD	Pts
1	Japan	2	2	0	0	6	2	+4	6
2	Turkmenistan	2	1	0	1	6	4	+2	3
3	Saudi Arabia	2	0	0	2	1	7	−6	0

Source: Futsal Planet
27 June
16:00

Japan	3–0	Saudi Arabia
Henmi 14'; Nibuya 25'; Uchimura 39'

Dongbu Students Gymnasium, Incheon
Referee: Trương Quốc Dũng (Vietnam)

29 June
16:00

Turkmenistan	4–1	Saudi Arabia
Aşyrow 20'; Annaýew 37'; Muradow 38'; Ataýew 40'		E. Al-Saad 23'

Dongbu Students Gymnasium, Incheon
Referee: Mahmoud Reza Nassirloo (Iran)

1 July
16:00

Japan	3–2	Turkmenistan
Takita 3'; Uchimura 13'; Watanabe 35'		Annaýew 27', 38'

Dongbu Students Gymnasium, Incheon
Referee: Scott Kidson (Australia)

===== Group G =====
Pos	Team	Pld	W	D	L	GF	GA	GD	Pts
1	Uzbekistan	2	2	0	0	16	3	+13	6
2	Qatar	2	1	0	1	8	12	−4	3
3	Afghanistan	2	0	0	2	8	17	−9	0

Source: Futsal Planet
27 June
18:30

Uzbekistan	10–2	Afghanistan
Irsaliev 1', 6', 36'; Yunusov 1'; Abdumavlyanov 4'; Tojiboev 12'; Anorov 15', 33', 34'; Mohammadi 22' (o.g.)		Sharifi 11'; Husaini 35'

Dongbu Students Gymnasium, Incheon
Referee: Kim Jong-hee (South Korea)

29 June
18:30

Qatar	7–6	Afghanistan
Al-Yafei 6'; Al-Braidi 13'; Al-Bulushi 15'; Al-Boinin 25' (pen.), 33' (pen.); H. Al-Deri 25'; Al-Sabah 32'		Sharifi 6'; Husaini 12', 32', 32'; Ahmadi 15'; Mohammadi 32'

Dongbu Students Gymnasium, Incheon
Referee: Hiroyuki Kobayashi (Japan)

1 July
18:30

Uzbekistan	6–1	Qatar
Khalmukhamedov 5', 30'; Irsaliev 8', 21'; Elibaev 28'; Rakhmatov 30'		Al-Sabah 14'

Dongbu Students Gymnasium, Incheon
Referee: Kim Jang-kwan (South Korea)

===== Second-placed teams =====
Pos	Team	Pld	W	D	L	GF	GA	GD	Pts
1	South Korea	3	2	0	1	19	7	+12	6
2	Vietnam	2	1	1	0	4	1	+3	4
3	Malaysia	2	1	0	1	17	4	+13	3
4	Indonesia	2	1	0	1	10	7	+3	3
5	Turkmenistan	2	1	0	1	6	4	+2	3
6	Qatar	2	1	0	1	8	12	−4	3
7	United Arab Emirates	2	1	0	1	3	15	−12	3

Source: Futsal Planet

==== Knockout stage ====
Quarterfinals
3 July
Thailand	7
Lebanon	3
3 July
Iran	8
China	0
3 July
Kuwait	4
South Korea	1
3 July
Japan	5
Uzbekistan	4

Semifinals
4 July
Thailand	4
Iran	5
4 July
Kuwait	4
Japan	6

Gold medal match
6 July
Iran	5
Japan	2
Bronze medal match
6 July
Thailand	9
Kuwait	6

===== Quarterfinals =====
3 July
16:00

Thailand	7–3	Lebanon
Sornwichian 3', 33'; Wongkaeo 4'; Thueanklang 16'; Lekkla 19'; Chudech 32'; Madyalan 35'		Takaji 15'; Tneich 19', 37'

Songdo Global University Gymnasium, Incheon
Referee: Nurdin Bukuev (Kyrgyzstan)

3 July
16:00

Iran	8–0	China
Bahadori 15'; Hassanzadeh 20', 28', 30'; Tayyebi 22', 37'; Khayyam 27'; Javid 31'

Dongbu Students Gymnasium, Incheon
Referee: Kim Jang-kwan (South Korea)

3 July
19:00

Kuwait	4–1	South Korea
Al-Mosabehi 10'; Al-Wadi 14', 21'; Al-Mutairi 39'		Kim Min-kuk 29'

Songdo Global University Gymnasium, Incheon
Referee: Scott Kidson (Australia)

3 July
19:00

Japan	5–4	Uzbekistan
Takita 9'; Henmi 15', 20' (pen.), 38'; Watanabe 39'		Yunusov 1'; Irsaliev 14'; Sato 30' (o.g.); Rakhmatov 40'

Dongbu Students Gymnasium, Incheon
Referee: Mahmoud Reza Nassirloo (Iran)

===== Semifinals =====
4 July
16:00

Thailand	4–5	Iran
Sornwichian 3'; Chaemcharoen 29'; Thueanklang 29'; Wongkaeo 40' (pen.)		Tayyebi 5', 7', 25'; Khayyam 20'; Bahadori 34'

Songdo Global University Gymnasium, Incheon
Referee: Scott Kidson (Australia)

4 July
19:00

Kuwait	4–6	Japan
Al-Mutairi 13'; Al-Farsi 23'; Al-Awadhi 25'; Al-Taweel 40'		Uchimura 5'; Watanabe 17', 23'; Nagai 35', 36'; Nishitani 39'

Songdo Global University Gymnasium, Incheon
Referee: Nurdin Bukuev (Kyrgyzstan)

===== Bronze medal match =====
6 July
10:30

Thailand	9–6	Kuwait
Chaemcharoen 6', 8', 16', 30'; Thueanklang 22'; Wongkaeo 25', 33'; Rattana 28', 40'		Al-Taweel 5'; Al-Mosabehi 11'; Al-Mutairi 11', 32'; Al-Wadi 36'; Al-Farsi 38'

Songdo Global University Gymnasium, Incheon
Referee: Yasukazu Nobumoto (Japan)

===== Gold medal match =====
6 July
13:00

Iran	5–2	Japan
Vafaei 21'; Tayyebi 23'; Taheri 31'; Hassanzadeh 37'; Shafiei 38'		Henmi 13'; Nishitani 36'

Songdo Global University Gymnasium, Incheon
Referee: Kim Jang-kwan (South Korea)

=== Women ===
==== Group stage ====
===== Group A =====
Pos	Team	Pld	W	D	L	GF	GA	GD	Pts
1	Iran	4	4	0	0	13	1	+12	12
2	Thailand	4	3	0	1	16	4	+12	9
3	Vietnam	4	2	0	2	9	7	+2	6
4	Hong Kong	4	1	0	3	8	17	−9	3
5	Malaysia	4	0	0	4	7	24	−17	0

Source: Futsal Planet
26 June
11:00

Thailand	4–1	Vietnam
O. Srimanee 5'; Srimuang 29'; Phothiwong 31'; Tupsuri 38'		Nguyễn Thị Thành 3'

Songdo Global University Gymnasium, Incheon
Referee: Da Fuping (China)

26 June
13:30

Malaysia	1–6	Iran
Mohamad Noor 18'		Zareei 18'; Gholami 26'; Mohamad Noor 29' (o.g.); Moghimi 33'; Karimi 35'; Norouzi 39'

Songdo Global University Gymnasium, Incheon
Referee: Zhu Beiqian (China)

27 June
13:30

Vietnam	2–1	Hong Kong
Nguyễn Thị Châu 14'; Trịnh Ngọc Hoa 36'		Cheung Wai Ki 10'

Songdo Global University Gymnasium, Incheon
Referee: Rim Dakkak Al-Chami (Lebanon)

27 June
13:30

Iran	1–0	Thailand
Zareei 26'

Dongbu Students Gymnasium, Incheon
Referee: Musab Al-Rashoud (Kuwait)

28 June
11:00

Hong Kong	6–4	Malaysia
Chan Wing Sze 2'; Lau Mung King 4', 31'; Cheung Wai Ki 10', 27'; Wong Shuk Fan 33'		Azmi 25'; Ag. Ng 28'; Mohamad Noor 34', 39'

Dongbu Students Gymnasium, Incheon
Referee: Yuttakon Maiket (Thailand)

28 June
13:30

Vietnam	0–1	Iran
		Ardalan 15'

Dongbu Students Gymnasium, Incheon
Referee: Rim Dakkak Al-Chami (Lebanon)

30 June
11:00

Malaysia	1–6	Vietnam
Munazli 38'		Trịnh Ngọc Hoa 18'; Yasin 25' (o.g.); Phạm Thị Huệ 27', 40'; Nguyễn Thị Thành 34', 34'

Songdo Global University Gymnasium, Incheon
Referee: Da Fuping (China)

30 June
11:00

Hong Kong	1–6	Thailand
Sin Chung Yee 22'		S. Srimanee 1'; O. Srimanee 3', 5', 27', 27'; Srimuang 35'

Dongbu Students Gymnasium, Incheon
Referee: Rim Dakkak Al-Chami (Lebanon)

1 July
13:30

Iran	5–0	Hong Kong
Gholami 3'; Zarinrad 15'; Ardalan 19'; Norouzi 24'; Malmoli 33'

Songdo Global University Gymnasium, Incheon
Referee: Helday Idang (Malaysia)

1 July
13:30

Thailand	6–1	Malaysia
O. Srimanee 1', 20'; Phothiwong 14', 22'; Tupsuri 26'; S. Srimanee 31'		Abdul Aziz 5'

Dongbu Students Gymnasium, Incheon
Referee: Trương Quốc Dũng (Vietnam)

===== Group B =====
Pos	Team	Pld	W	D	L	GF	GA	GD	Pts
1	Japan	3	3	0	0	18	2	+16	9
2	Indonesia	3	2	0	1	7	7	0	6
3	China	3	0	1	2	4	8	−4	1
4	Uzbekistan	3	0	1	2	2	14	−12	1

Source: Futsal Planet
26 June
11:00

Japan	8–0	Uzbekistan
Sabirova 3' (o.g.); Shinomiya 5', 25'; Koide 8', 10'; Kichibayashi 23', 30'; Sakata 30'

Dongbu Students Gymnasium, Incheon
Referee: Fatemeh Kamandi (Iran)

26 June
13:30

Indonesia	2–1	China
Rosdiana 15'; Novryliani 39'		Xiao Ying 30'

Dongbu Students Gymnasium, Incheon
Referee: Maryam Pourjafarian (Iran)

28 June
11:00

Uzbekistan	1–5	Indonesia
Safina 23'		R. Sari 3'; Rosdiana 25'; Piranti 33'; Novryliani 35'; Fatmawati 36'

Songdo Global University Gymnasium, Incheon
Referee: Mahmoud Reza Nassirloo (Iran)

28 June
13:30

China	2–5	Japan
Hu Yingjie 9'; Lu Yang 32'		Sekinada 6', 11', 19'; Kichibayashi 9', 24'

Songdo Global University Gymnasium, Incheon
Referee: Maryam Pourjafarian (Iran)

30 June
13:30

China	1–1	Uzbekistan
Hu Yingjie 40'		Salnikova 22'

Songdo Global University Gymnasium, Incheon
Referee: Fatemeh Kamandi (Iran)

30 June
13:30

Japan	5–0	Indonesia
Kitagawa 13'; Aoyama 19'; Sekinada 26', 37'; Kitazumi 37'

Dongbu Students Gymnasium, Incheon
Referee: Trương Quốc Dũng (Vietnam)

==== Knockout stage ====
Semifinals
3 July
Iran	4
Indonesia	0
3 July
Japan	2
Thailand	1

Gold medal match
5 July
Iran	1
Japan (a.e.t.)	2
Bronze medal match
5 July
Indonesia	1
Thailand	5

===== Semifinals =====
3 July
13:00

Iran	4–0	Indonesia
Gholami 11'; Rosdiana 17' (o.g.); Karimi 17'; Ardalan 27'

Songdo Global University Gymnasium, Incheon
Referee: Tomohiro Kozaki (Japan)

3 July
13:00

Japan	2–1	Thailand
Kichibayashi 22'; Sekinada 35'		O. Srimanee 36'

Dongbu Students Gymnasium, Incheon
Referee: Mohamad Chami (Lebanon)

===== Bronze medal match =====
5 July
16:00

Indonesia	1–5	Thailand
R. Sari 4'		O. Srimanee 7', 10'; Phothiwong 31', 33'; S. Srimanee 36'

Songdo Global University Gymnasium, Incheon
Referee: Fatemeh Kamandi (Iran)

===== Gold medal match =====
5 July
19:00

Iran	1–2 (a.e.t.)	Japan
Gholami 3'		Kichibayashi 27'; Shibahara 48'

Songdo Global University Gymnasium, Incheon
Referee: Rim Dakkak Al-Chami (Lebanon)

== Goalscorers ==
=== Men ===
12 goals

- Kritsada Wongkaeo (THA)

11 goals

- Hossein Tayyebi (IRI)

9 goals

- Suphawut Thueanklang (THA)

8 goals

- Apiwat Chaemcharoen (THA)

7 goals

- Ali Asghar Hassanzadeh (IRI)
- Abdulrahman Al-Mosabehi (KUW)

6 goals

- Mohammad Taheri (IRI)
- Ahmad Fawzul Hadzir (MAS)
- Dilshod Irsaliev (UZB)

5 goals

- Ghodrat Bahadori (IRI)
- Rafael Henmi (JPN)
- Shaker Al-Mutairi (KUW)
- Abdulrahman Al-Wadi (KUW)
- Ali Tneich (LIB)
- Nattawut Madyalan (THA)

4 goals

- Mohammad Nasir Husaini (AFG)
- Bambang Bayu Saptaji (INA)
- Mehdi Javid (IRI)
- Tomoaki Watanabe (JPN)
- Hamad Al-Awadhi (KUW)
- Jetsada Chudech (THA)
- Nawin Rattanawongswas (THA)
- Jirawat Sornwichian (THA)

3 goals

- Deng Tao (CHN)
- Hu Jie (CHN)
- Ali Kiaei (IRI)
- Vahid Shafiei (IRI)
- Waleed Khalid (IRQ)
- Shunta Uchimura (JPN)
- Kim Gyeong-geun (KOR)
- Kim Min-kuk (KOR)
- Lee Min-yong (KOR)
- Ahmad Al-Farsi (KUW)
- Muzhaffar Tahar (MAS)
- Shamsul Akmar Zamri (MAS)
- Kongla Lekkla (THA)
- Myrat Annaýew (TKM)
- Javlon Anorov (UZB)

2 goals

- Amirudeen Sharifi (AFG)
- Gu Haitao (CHN)
- Li Hang Wui (HKG)
- So Sheung Kwai (HKG)
- Randy Satria Mushar (INA)
- Meisam Khayyam (IRI)
- Alireza Vafaei (IRI)
- Yoshifumi Nagai (JPN)
- Ryosuke Nishitani (JPN)
- Manabu Takita (JPN)
- Kim Ho-jin (KOR)
- Lee Jeong-won (KOR)
- Seo Dae-yun (KOR)
- Abdulrahman Al-Taweel (KUW)
- Ali El-Homsi (LIB)
- Kassem Ezzeddine (LIB)
- Khaled Takaji (LIB)
- Paulo Cheang (MAC)
- Mahmoud Fahjan (PLE)
- Rashid Al-Boinin (QAT)
- Ali Al-Sabah (QAT)
- Piyapan Rattana (THA)
- Abdulraouf Al-Marzouqi (UAE)
- Oleg Khalmukhamedov (UZB)
- Dilshod Rakhmatov (UZB)
- Artur Yunusov (UZB)
- Trần Văn Vũ (VIE)

1 goal

- Mohammad Ahmadi (AFG)
- Samiullah Mohammadi (AFG)
- Dawa Dhendup (BHU)
- Liang Shuang (CHN)
- Chow Ka Wa (HKG)
- Andriansyah Agustin (INA)
- Julinur Hafid (INA)
- Andri Kustiawan (INA)
- Indra Kurnia Purnomo (INA)
- Hussein Abd-Ali (IRQ)
- Ali Jabbar (IRQ)
- Kazuhiro Nibuya (JPN)
- Lee Jeong-jin (KOR)
- Eihab Al-Saad (KSA)
- Mohammad Al-Kandari (KUW)
- Hamad Hayat (KUW)
- Karim Abou Zeid (LIB)
- Kassem Kawsan (LIB)
- Mohammad Kobeissy (LIB)
- Chan Man Hou (MAC)
- Khairul Effendy Bahrin (MAS)
- Shamar Fadzil (MAS)
- Abu Haniffa Hasan (MAS)
- Qaiser Heshaam Kadir (MAS)
- Asmie Amir Zahari (MAS)
- Hammam Abuhasanein (PLE)
- Jalal Abuyousef (PLE)
- Said Al-Sbakhi (PLE)
- Hadi Al-Braidi (QAT)
- Said Ghulam Al-Bulushi (QAT)
- Hamad Al-Deri (QAT)
- Abdullah Al-Yafei (QAT)
- Chaivat Jamgrajang (THA)
- Piyanat Nusaya (THA)
- Gurbanguly Aşyrow (TKM)
- Watan Ataýew (TKM)
- Maksat Muradow (TKM)
- Pan Wen-chieh (TPE)
- Liu Chi-chao (TPE)
- Yousif Banihammad (UAE)
- Farkhod Abdumavlyanov (UZB)
- Nodir Elibaev (UZB)
- Shuhrat Tojiboev (UZB)
- Lưu Quỳnh Toàn (VIE)
- Ngô Anh Dũng (VIE)

1 own goal

- Samiullah Mohammadi (AFG) (against UZB)
- Leung Hing Kit (HKG) (against KOR)
- Toru Sato (JPN) (against UZB)
- Abdulrahman Al-Mosabehi (KUW) (against KOR)
- Chan Pak Chun (MAC) (against KOR)
- Leong Chong In (MAC) (against KOR)
- Chen Sung-nan (TPE) (against CHN)

=== Women ===
10 goals

- Orathai Srimanee (THA)

6 goals

- Chikage Kichibayashi (JPN)
- Minako Sekinada (JPN)

5 goals

- Sasicha Phothiwong (THA)

4 goals

- Nasimeh Gholami (IRI)

3 goals

- Cheung Wai Ki (HKG)
- Niloufar Ardalan (IRI)
- Noor Asyikin Mohamad Noor (MAS)
- Siranya Srimanee (THA)
- Nguyễn Thị Thành (VIE)

2 goals

- Hu Yingjie (CHN)
- Lau Mung King (HKG)
- Maulina Novryliani (INA)
- Fitri Rosdiana (INA)
- Rani Mulya Sari (INA)
- Fereshteh Karimi (IRI)
- Paria Norouzi (IRI)
- Fahimeh Zareei (IRI)
- Natsumi Koide (JPN)
- Yumiko Shinomiya (JPN)
- Pacharaporn Srimuang (THA)
- Jiraprapa Tupsuri (THA)
- Phạm Thị Huệ (VIE)
- Trịnh Ngọc Hoa (VIE)

1 goal

- Lu Yang (CHN)
- Xiao Ying (CHN)
- Chan Wing Sze (HKG)
- Sin Chung Yee (HKG)
- Wong Shuk Fan (HKG)
- Deliana Fatmawati (INA)
- Novita Murni Piranti (INA)
- Soheila Malmoli (IRI)
- Nastaran Moghimi (IRI)
- Sepideh Zarinrad (IRI)
- Minae Aoyama (JPN)
- Kana Kitagawa (JPN)
- Haruna Kitazumi (JPN)
- Mutsumi Sakata (JPN)
- Kana Shibahara (JPN)
- Farah Najihah Abdul Aziz (MAS)
- Fatin Shahida Azmi (MAS)
- Nur Shazreen Munazli (MAS)
- Felicity Agnes Ng (MAS)
- Rushania Safina (UZB)
- Ekaterina Salnikova (UZB)
- Nguyễn Thị Châu (VIE)

1 own goal

- Fitri Rosdiana (INA) (against IRI)
- Noor Asyikin Mohamad Noor (MAS) (against IRI)
- Norhawa Yasin (MAS) (against VIE)
- Mariya Sabirova (UZB) (against JPN)
