= Vietnam national futsal team =

Vietnam
- Association: Vietnam Football Federation (VFF)
- Confederation: Asian Football Confederation (Asia)
- Head coach: Diego Giustozzi
- Captain: Nguyễn Mạnh Dũng
- Most caps: Nguyễn Bảo Quân (100)
- Top scorer: Nguyễn Bảo Quân (50)
- Home stadium: Various
- FIFA code: VIE
- FIFA ranking: 20 ▲2 (24 September 2026)
- Highest FIFA ranking: 20 (December 2025, September 2026)
- Lowest FIFA ranking: 34 (November 2024)
Home colours	Away colours

First international
- Italy 11–2 Vietnam (Singapore; 4 December 1997)

Biggest win
- Vietnam 24–0 Philippines (Ho Chi Minh City, Vietnam; 27 October 2017)

Biggest defeat
- Vietnam 2–14 Iran (Singapore; 5 December 1997); Vietnam 1–13 Iran (Tashkent, Uzbekistan; 19 February 2016)

FIFA World Cup
- Appearances: 2 (First in 2016)
- Best result: Round of 16 (2016, 2021)

AFC Futsal Asian Cup
- Appearances: 7 (First in 2005)
- Best result: Fourth place (2016)

ASEAN Futsal Championship
- Appearances: 15 (First in 2005)
- Best result: Runners-up (2009, 2012, 2024)

The Vietnam national futsal team (Vietnamese: Đội tuyển bóng đá trong nhà quốc gia Việt Nam) represents Vietnam in international men's futsal and is governed by the Vietnam Football Federation.

== History ==
=== Beginning ===
In 1950, the South Vietnam futsal team was established, the predecessor of the current Vietnam national futsal team, but could not go abroad to play due to political problems.

In 1997, the first national team's squad was set up. In that time, all Vietnamese futsal players came from football such as: Nguyễn Hữu Thắng, Nguyễn Hồng Sơn, Lại Công Minh, Trần Minh Chiến. The team joined 1997 Tiger's Cup/World 5's Futsal in Singapore. In this tournament, they were drawn in the same group with Italy, Iran and the host Singapore. They finished last in their group after losing all 3 games against Italy, Iran and Spain. Vietnam then won the seventh-place game against host team Singapore, the first victory in the team's history. After this tournament, the team was disbanded for many years.

=== 2005–2008: Debut in official tournaments ===
After being inactive for eight years, the national team was reformed and joined 2005 AFF Futsal Championship and 2005 AFC Futsal Championship, of which Vietnam was host. The team finished 5/6 teams in AFF Futsal Championship 2005 and the bottom of 2005 AFC Championship. Vietnam failed to qualify for the AFC Championship in 2006 and 2007. The team also failed to reach the far from group-stage of the AFF tournament.

=== 2009–2013: Regeneration ===
After these results in international competitions, the team decided to hire foreign futsal head coach. In 2008, Pattaya Piamkum was the first foreign futsal head coach. Vietnam reached to the final of 2009 AFF Futsal Championship which Vietnam was host, the team's first ever in AFF Futsal Championship.

In 2010, Pattaya resigned and was replaced by an Italian head coach, Sergio Gargelli. The team qualified for 2010 AFC Futsal Championship, their second continental tournament since 2005. In region AFF tournaments, the team earned two silver medals in 2011 Southeast Asian Games and 2013 Southeast Asian Games, finish second in 2012 AFF Futsal Championship.

=== 2014–2016: Success in AFC tournaments and first FIFA Futsal World Cup ===
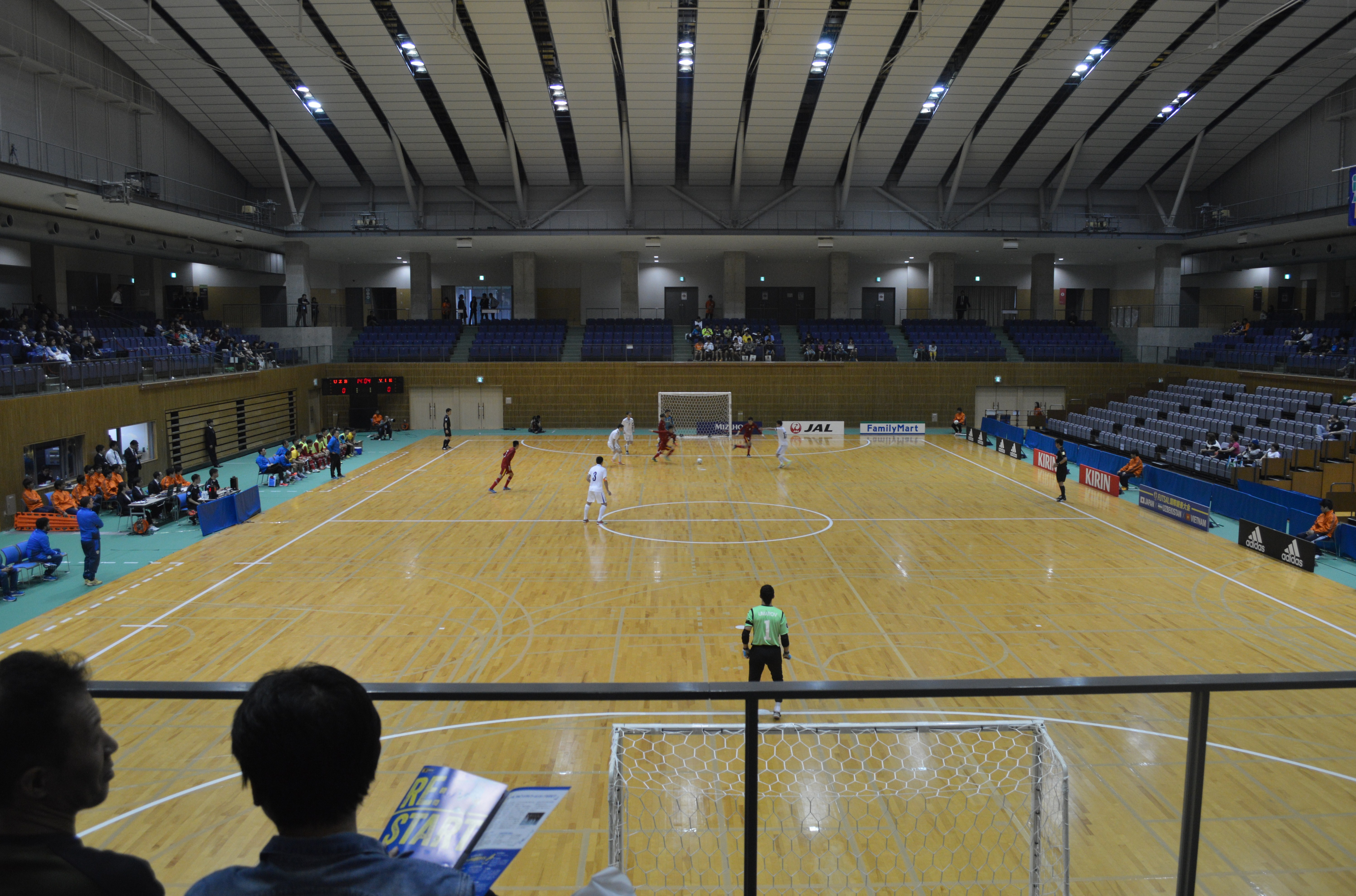
Vietnam (red) playing versus Uzbekistan a friendly tournament in Japan in 2016. The tournament was organized after Vietnam defeated Japan at 2016 AFC Futsal Championship.

In 2014, Gargelli stepped down as coach. Bruno García Formoso became the new coach of the team. Vietnam qualified for 2014 AFC Futsal Championship, the third AFC competition, as host. In this tournament, Vietnam reached the quarter-final for the first time.

Vietnam also qualified for 2016 AFC Futsal Championship. The team got a shocking win over Japan in the quarter-final and reached the semi-final for the first time. This result also qualified Vietnam for 2016 FIFA Futsal World Cup in Colombia, their first FIFA tournament. The team also reached the knock-out stage after beating Guatemala 4–2, losing to Paraguay 1–7 and Italy 0–2. In the round of 16, they lost to Russia 0–7. The team also got FIFA Fair-play award from this tournament, first FIFA award of Vietnam Football.

=== 2017–2020: the new stage ===
After 2016's success, García stepped down as coach. In 2017, Miguel Rodrigo became the new coach.

Vietnam played exhibition games in Andalusia against Spanish clubs during late February to early March 2019.

=== 2021 World Cup: Second World Cup ===
The team qualified for the 2021 FIFA Futsal World Cup after holding a draw with Lebanon in two-legged matches Asian play-off with a total score of 1–1 (Vietnam qualified because of the away goal rule).

In the World Cup, Vietnam was drawn in group D along with Brazil, Czech Republic and Panama. After being thrashed by Brazil 1–9 in the opening match, Vietnam secured a needed victory against Panama with the total score of 3–2 and drew the Czech Republic 1–1, putting them in the top 4 third-placed teams and qualifying them for the round of 16 for the second time in a row. There, they met Russia, the team that they had lost against 0-7 five years ago. Vietnam narrowly lost to Russia 2–3 and end their campaign in the round of 16 in high spirits.

== Results and fixtures ==
The following is a list of match results in the last 12 months, as well as any future matches that have been scheduled.

Legend

Win Draw Lose Fixture

=== 2025 ===
16 December SEA Games	Malaysia	4–2	Vietnam	Nonthaburi, Thailand
16:00 UTC+7	Harith 4'; Syahir 7', 21'; Awalludin 18'	Report	Nguyễn Đa Hải 3'; Nguyễn Mạnh Dũng 37'	Stadium: Nonthaburi Sports Complex Gymnasium; Referee: Sukhrob Sattorov (Tajikistan)

17 December SEA Games	Vietnam	1–0	Indonesia	Nonthaburi, Thailand
16:00 UTC+7	Từ Minh Quang 11'	Report		Stadium: Nonthaburi Sports Complex Gymnasium; Referee: Ahmad Al Daou (Lebanon)

18 December SEA Games	Vietnam	1–2	Thailand	Nonthaburi, Thailand
19:00 UTC+7	Nguyễn Đa Hải 30'	Report	Muhammad Osamanmusa 15'; Itticha Praphaphan 29'	Stadium: Nonthaburi Sports Complex Gymnasium; Referee: Yahya Alathwani (Saudi Arabia)

19 December SEA Games	Myanmar	2–4	Vietnam	Nonthaburi, Thailand
16:00 UTC+7	Min Khant Thu 31'; Naing Linn Tun Kyaw 40'	Report	Nguyễn Đa Hải 25', 33'; Trịnh Công Đại 36'; Vũ Ngọc Ánh 38'	Stadium: Nonthaburi Sports Complex Gymnasium; Referee: Moon Dae-sung (South Korea)

=== 2026 ===
18 January Friendly	Vietnam	3–5	Afghanistan	Ho Chi Minh City, Vietnam
--:-- UTC+7		Report	Kazemi; Reza; Hosseinpoor; S. Mojtaba; S. Morteza	Stadium: Thái Sơn Nam Arena

20 January Friendly	Vietnam	2–5	Afghanistan	Ho Chi Minh City, Vietnam
--:-- UTC+7		Report	S. Mojtaba; Reza; Hosseinpoor	Stadium: Lãnh Binh Thăng

27 January Asian Cup GS	Vietnam	5–4	Kuwait	Jakarta, Indonesia
17:00 UTC+7	Châu Đoàn Phát 8'44"; Nguyễn Thịnh Phát 14'53"; Nguyễn Mạnh Dũng 19'59", 31'58"; Từ Minh Quang 29'23"		Al-Enezi 6'15"; Borashed 8'02"; O. Al-Shatti 18'01"; Al-Sarraj 37'44"	Stadium: Jakarta International Velodrome; Referee: Liu Jianqiao (China)

29 January Asian Cup GS	Lebanon	0–2	Vietnam	Jakarta, Indonesia
13:00 UTC+7			Đinh Công Viên 0'19"; Vũ Ngọc Ánh 3'34"	Stadium: Jakarta International Velodrome

31 January Asian Cup GS	Thailand	1–0	Vietnam	Jakarta, Indonesia
15:00 UTC+7				Stadium: Indonesia Arena

3 February Asian Cup QF	Indonesia	3–2	Vietnam	Jakarta, Indonesia
19:00 UTC+7				Stadium: Indonesia Arena

31 March Hybrid friendly	Hongyen Thakam (Thailand)	3–2	Vietnam	Bangkok, Thailand
--:-- UTC+7		Report

2 April Hybrid friendly	Blackpearl United (Thailand)	2–2	Vietnam	Bangkok, Thailand
--:-- UTC+7		Report

6 April ASEAN Championship GS	Vietnam	4–0	Myanmar	Nonthaburi, Thailand
17:30 UTC+7	Nhan Gia Hưng 12'; Nguyễn Đa Hải 21', 22'; Nguyễn Thạc Hiếu 28'	Report		Stadium: Nonthaburi Sports Complex Gymnasium; Referee: Wahyu Wicaksono (Indonesia)

7 April ASEAN Championship GS	Timor-Leste	1–7	Vietnam	Nonthaburi, Thailand
17:30 UTC+7	J. Fernandes 39'	Report	Từ Minh Quang 3'; Nguyễn Thịnh Phát 5'; Nguyễn Đa Hải 12'; Trần Quang Nguyên 20'; Đinh Công Viên 26'; Trịnh Công Đại 30'; Nguyễn Thạc Hiếu 38'	Stadium: Nonthaburi Sports Complex Gymnasium; Referee: Initan Jan Dlanor (Philippines)

9 April ASEAN Championship GS	Thailand	4–2	Vietnam	Nonthaburi, Thailand
20:00 UTC+7	Itticha 16'; Sarawut 20'; Mintada 23'; Vũ Ngọc Ánh 40' (o.g.)	Report	Từ Minh Quang 23'; Nguyễn Đa Hải 35'	Stadium: Nonthaburi Sports Complex Gymnasium; Referee: Kim Tae-wan (South Korea)

10 April ASEAN Championship SF	Indonesia	3–2	Vietnam	Nonthaburi, Thailand
17:00 UTC+7	Kareth 10', 13'; Sanjaya 23'		Nguyễn Đa Hải 22'; Trần Quang Nguyên 30'	Stadium: Nonthaburi Sports Complex Gymnasium; Referee: Moon Dae-sung (South Korea)

12 April ASEAN Championship 3rd place	Vietnam	4–0	Australia	Nonthaburi, Thailand
17:00 UTC+7				Stadium: Nonthaburi Sports Complex Gymnasium; Referee: Kim Tae-wan (South Korea)

1 August Continental Futsal Championship	Russia	2–2	Vietnam	Nonthaburi, Thailand
18:00 UTC+7	Pavlov 10'; Pirogov 27'		Nguyễn Thịnh Phát 24'; Trần Thái Huy 25'	Stadium: Nonthaburi Sports Complex Gymnasium

2 August Continental Futsal Championship	New Zealand	1–4	Vietnam	Nonthaburi, Thailand
18:00 UTC+7	Paulsen 31'		Trịnh Công Đại 4'; Châu Đoàn Phát 33'; Nguyễn Thịnh Phát 34'; Trần Thái Huy 36'	Stadium: Nonthaburi Sports Complex Gymnasium

3 August Continental Futsal Championship	Vietnam	2–1	Afghanistan	Nonthaburi, Thailand
20:30 UTC+7	Nguyễn Thịnh Phát 2'; Hosseinpoor 27' (o.g.)		Hosseinpoor 35'	Stadium: Nonthaburi Sports Complex Gymnasium

5 August Continental Futsal Championship	Vietnam	3–3	Thailand	Nonthaburi, Thailand
20:30 UTC+7	Châu Đoàn Phát 31'; Từ Minh Quang 34'; Nguyễn Đa Hải 38'		Therdsak 2'; Panat 7', 14'	Stadium: Nonthaburi Sports Complex Gymnasium

3 November Friendly	Kyrgyzstan	2–1	Vietnam	Bishkek, Kyrgyzstan
--:-- UTC+6	Iliasov 8'; Makhmadaminov 40'		Từ Minh Quang 35'	Stadium: KFU Sports Complex

5 November Friendly	Kyrgyzstan	2–2	Vietnam	Bishkek, Kyrgyzstan
--:-- UTC+6	Talaibekov 24'; Doolotov 35'	Report	Nguyễn Thịnh Phát 15'; Từ Minh Quang 37'	Stadium: KFU Sports Complex

8 November Friendly	Russia	8–0	Vietnam	Nizhny Novgorod, Russia
--:-- UTC+6	Moskalev 2', 20'; Musin-Pushkin 2'; Ponkratov 8'; Sokolov 13'; Shukletsov 29'; Pirogov 34'; Smirnov 38'	Report		Stadium: FOK Meshchersky

10 November Friendly	Russia	3–3	Vietnam	Nizhny Novgorod, Russia
--:-- UTC+6	Pirogov 8'; Karpov 12'; Muzhdakov 39'	Report	Từ Minh Quang 12'; Trần Thái Huy 22'; Nguyễn Thịnh Phát 29'	Stadium: FOK Meshchersky

== Coaching staff ==
=== Current coaching staff ===
As of 17 September 2025

Position	Name
Manager	(Argentina) Diego Giustozzi
Assistant manager	(Argentina) Nicolas Gulizia (Vietnam) Nguyễn Tuấn Anh
Interpreter	(Vietnam) Huỳnh Tấn Quốc
Technical Director	(Vietnam) Nguyễn Thành Nguyên
Goalkeeping coach	(Spain) Javier Arrivi Loureiro
Fitness Trainer	(Spain) Giuliano Prioriello
Physiotherapist	(Italy) Oreste Aguglia (Vietnam) Nguyễn Văn Nu (Vietnam) Lương Quý Quỳnh

=== Manager history ===
Nationality	Coach	Year	Ref.
Vietnam	Nguyễn Thành Vinh	1997	
Vietnam	Nguyễn Văn Long	2005–2007	
Thailand	Pattaya Piamkum	2008–2010	
Italy	Sergio Gargelli	2010–2013	
Spain	Bruno García Formoso	2014–2016	
Vietnam	Nguyễn Bảo Quân	2016–2017	
Spain	Miguel Rodrigo	2017–2019	
Vietnam	Phạm Minh Giang	2019–2022	
Argentina	Diego Giustozzi	2022–	

== Players ==
=== Current squad ===
The following 14 players were called up for the 2026 ASEAN Futsal Championship in April 2026.

No.	Pos.	Player	Date of birth (age)	Club
1	GK	Phạm Văn Tú	7 April 1997 (age 29)	(Vietnam Football Federation) Thái Sơn Bắc
2	GK	Hồ Văn Ý	1 January 1997 (age 29)	(Vietnam Football Federation) Thái Sơn Nam HCMC
3	DF	Trần Quang Nguyên	12 January 2006 (age 20)	(Vietnam Football Federation) Thái Sơn Bắc
5	DF	Nguyễn Mạnh Dũng (captain)	9 June 1997 (age 29)	(Vietnam Football Federation) Thái Sơn Nam HCMC
13	DF	Nhan Gia Hưng	13 July 2002 (age 24)	(Vietnam Football Federation) Thái Sơn Nam HCMC
14	DF	Đinh Công Viên	7 January 2002 (age 24)	(Vietnam Football Federation) Thái Sơn Nam HCMC
4	MF	Châu Đoàn Phát	14 March 1999 (age 27)	(Vietnam Football Federation) Thái Sơn Nam HCMC
6	MF	Nguyễn Thạc Hiếu	17 December 2006 (age 19)	(Vietnam Football Federation) Thái Sơn Bắc
8	MF	Trịnh Công Đại	16 March 2005 (age 21)	(Vietnam Football Federation) Thái Sơn Bắc
9	MF	Trần Thái Huy	12 October 1995 (age 31)	(Vietnam Football Federation) Thái Sơn Nam HCMC
11	MF	Vũ Ngọc Ánh	22 February 2004 (age 22)	(Vietnam Football Federation) Thái Sơn Bắc
12	MF	Từ Minh Quang	1 November 1998 (age 28)	(Vietnam Football Federation) Thái Sơn Bắc
7	FW	Nguyễn Đa Hải	13 August 2005 (age 21)	(Vietnam Football Federation) Thái Sơn Bắc
10	FW	Nguyễn Thịnh Phát	10 June 1997 (age 29)	(Vietnam Football Federation) Thái Sơn Nam HCMC

=== Recent call-ups ===
The following players have also been called up to the Vietnam squad within the last 12 months.

Pos.	Player	Date of birth (age)	Caps	Goals	Club	Latest call-up
GK	Trần Văn Lương	14 December 2003 (age 22)	-	-	(Vietnam) Thai Son Nam	2026 ASEAN Futsal Championship ^{PRE}
GK	Nguyễn Quốc Giàu	2009 (age 16-17)	-	-	(Vietnam) Hồ Chí Minh City Youth	2026 ASEAN Futsal Championship ^{PRE}
GK	Lưu Thanh Bảo	28 January 2005 (age 21)	-	-	(Vietnam) Sài Gòn Titans	2026 AFC Futsal Asian Cup ^{PRE}
DF	Phạm Đức Hòa	12 April 1991 (age 35)	-	-	Retired	2025 SEA Games
MF	Dương Ngọc Linh	20 May 1997 (age 29)	-	-	(Vietnam) Thái Sơn Nam HCMC	2026 ASEAN Futsal Championship ^{PRE}
MF	Nguyễn Hoàng Quân	31 August 2005 (age 21)	-	-	(Vietnam) Thái Sơn Nam HCMC	2026 ASEAN Futsal Championship ^{PRE}
MF	Nguyễn Tiến Hùng	30 December 2005 (age 20)	-	-	(Vietnam) Thái Sơn Nam HCMC	2026 ASEAN Futsal Championship ^{PRE}
FW	An Lâm Tới	10 May 2001 (age 25)			(Vietnam) Thái Sơn Bắc	2026 ASEAN Futsal Championship ^{PRE}
FW	Nguyễn Minh Trí	8 April 1996 (age 30)	-	-	Retired	2025 SEA Games
FW	Nguyễn Văn Tuấn	18 October 1999 (age 27)	-	-	(Vietnam) Thái Sơn Bắc	2025 SEA Games ^{PRE}

Notes:

- ^{SUS} Player suspended.
- ^{INJ} Player withdrew from the squad due to an injury.
- ^{RET} Retired from the national team.
- ^{WD} Player withdrew from the squad for non-injury related reasons.
- ^{PRE} Preliminary squad.

=== Previous squads ===
FIFA Futsal World Cup

- 2016 FIFA Futsal World Cup squads
- 2021 FIFA Futsal World Cup squads

AFC Futsal Asian Cup

- 2016 AFC Futsal Championship squads
- 2018 AFC Futsal Championship squads
- 2022 AFC Futsal Asian Cup squads
- 2024 AFC Futsal Asian Cup squads

AFF Futsal Championship

- 2016 AFF Futsal Championship squads
- 2017 AFF Futsal Championship squads

== Competitive record ==
=== Summary ===
Competition	Level	1st place, gold medalist(s)	2nd place, silver medalist(s)	3rd place, bronze medalist(s)	Total
Friendlies	F	0	2	3	5
SEA Games	F	0	2	2	4
AFF Cup	F or Continental Q.	0	3	5	8
Asian Games	F	0	0	0	0
Asian Cup	Continent	0	0	0	0
Grand Prix	Confederations	0	0	0	0
Confed Cup	Confederations				
AMF World Cup	World Cup				
FIFA World Cup	World Cup	0	0	0	0
Total		0	7	10	17

=== FIFA Futsal World Cup ===
FIFA World Cup record
Year	Result	Position	Pld	W	D*	L	GF	GA
1989	Did not enter							
1992	Did not enter							
1996	Did not enter							
2000	Did not enter							
2004	Did not enter							
2008	Did not qualify							
2012	Did not qualify							
2016	Round of 16	16th	4	1	0	3	5	18
2021	Round of 16	13th	4	1	1	2	7	15
(Uzbekistan) 2024	Did not qualify							
2028	To be determined							
Total:2/10	Round of 16	13th	8	2	1	5	12	33

FIFA Futsal World Cup history
Season	Round	Opponent	Scores	Result	Venue
2016	Group stage	Guatemala	4–2	Won	Cali, Colombia
2016	Group stage	Paraguay	1–7	Loss	Cali, Colombia
2016	Group stage	Italy	0–2	Loss	Bucaramanga, Colombia
2016	Round of 16	Russia	0–7	Loss	Medellín, Colombia
2021	Group stage	Brazil	1–9	Loss	Klaipėda, Lithuania
2021	Group stage	Panama	3–2	Won	Klaipėda, Lithuania
2021	Group stage	Czech Republic	1–1	Draw	Kaunas, Lithuania
2021	Round of 16	RFU	2–3	Loss	Vilnius, Lithuania

=== AFC Futsal Asian Cup ===
AFC Futsal Asian Cup										Qualification							
Year	Round	Rank	M	W	D	L	GF	GA	GD	M	W	D	L	GF	GA	GD	Link
1999	Did not enter									No qualification							
2000	Did not enter									No qualification							
2001	Did not enter									No qualification							
2002	Did not enter									No qualification							
2003	Did not enter									No qualification							
2004	Did not enter									No qualification							
2005	Second round	13rd	6	2	1	3	13	19	-6	No qualification							
2006	Did not qualify									4	1	1	2	15	14	+1	Link
2007	Did not enter									Did not enter							Link
2008	Did not qualify									3	1	1	1	12	14	-2	Link
2010	Group stage	10th	3	1	0	2	11	12	-1	5	3	1	1	25	12	+13	Link
2012	Did not qualify									5	2	1	2	17	9	+8	Link
2014	Quarter-finals	7th	4	2	0	2	17	22	-5	2013 AFF Futsal Championship							Link
2016	Fourth Place	4th	6	2	1	3	19	33	-14	2015 AFF Futsal Championship							Link
2018	Quarter-finals	7th	4	2	0	2	7	7	0	2017 AFF Futsal Championship							Link
(Turkmenistan) ~~2020~~	Qualified but cancelled									2019 AFF Futsal Championship							Link
2022	Quarter-finals	7th	4	2	0	2	9	12	-3	2022 AFF Futsal Championship							Link
2024	Quarter-finals	7th	5	1	1	3	6	8	-2	3	3	0	0	16	3	+13	Link
2026	Quarter-finals	7th	4	2	0	2	9	8	+1	3	3	0	0	20	3	+17	Link
Total:8/18	Fourth Place	4th	36	14	3	19	91	121	-30	23	13	4	6	105	55	+50	–

AFC Futsal Asian Cup history
Season	Round	Opponent	Scores	Result	Venue
2005	Preliminary Round	Kyrgyzstan	1–4	Loss	Ho Chi Minh City, Vietnam
2005	Preliminary Round	Hong Kong	1–1	Draw	Ho Chi Minh City, Vietnam
2005	Preliminary Round	Iraq	1–8	Loss	Ho Chi Minh City, Vietnam
2010	Group stage	South Korea	7–3	Won	Tashkent, Uzbekistan
2010	Group stage	Kyrgyzstan	2–4	Loss	Tashkent, Uzbekistan
2010	Group stage	Thailand	2–5	Loss	Tashkent, Uzbekistan
2014	Group stage	Iraq	1–2	Loss	Ho Chi Minh City, Vietnam
2014	Group stage	Tajikistan	10–4	Won	Ho Chi Minh City, Vietnam
2014	Group stage	Kuwait	2–1	Won	Ho Chi Minh City, Vietnam
2014	Quarter-finals	Iran	4–15	Loss	Ho Chi Minh City, Vietnam
2016	Group stage	Chinese Taipei	5–4	Won	Tashkent, Uzbekistan
2016	Group stage	Tajikistan	8–1	Won	Tashkent, Uzbekistan
2016	Group stage	Thailand	1–3	Loss	Tashkent, Uzbekistan
2016	Quarter-finals	Japan	4–4 a.e.t (pens. 2–1)	Won	Tashkent, Uzbekistan
2016	Semi-finals	Iran	1–13	Loss	Tashkent, Uzbekistan
2016	Third place play-off	Thailand	0–8	Loss	Tashkent, Uzbekistan
2018	Group stage	Malaysia	1–2	Loss	New Taipei City, Chinese Taipei
2018	Group stage	Bahrain	2–1	Won	New Taipei City, Chinese Taipei
2018	Group stage	Chinese Taipei	3–1	Won	New Taipei City, Chinese Taipei
2018	Quarter-finals	Uzbekistan	1–3	Loss	New Taipei City, Chinese Taipei
2022	Group stage	South Korea	5–1	Won	Kuwait City, Kuwait
2022	Group stage	Saudi Arabia	3–1	Won	Kuwait City, Kuwait
2022	Group stage	Japan	0–2	Loss	Kuwait City, Kuwait
2022	Quarter-finals	Iran	1–8	Loss	Kuwait City, Kuwait
2024	Group stage	Myanmar	1–1	Draw	Bangkok, Thailand
2024	Group stage	China	1–0	Won	Bangkok, Thailand
2024	Group stage	Thailand	1–2	Loss	Bangkok, Thailand
2024	Quarter-finals	Uzbekistan	1–2	Loss	Bangkok, Thailand
2024	Play-offs	Kyrgyzstan	2–3	Loss	Bangkok, Thailand
2026	Group stage	Kuwait	5–4	Won	Jakarta, Indonesia
2026	Group stage	Lebanon	2–0	Won	Jakarta, Indonesia
2026	Group stage	Thailand	0–1	Loss	Jakarta, Indonesia
2026	Quarter-finals	Indonesia	2–3	Loss	Jakarta, Indonesia

=== ASEAN Futsal Championship ===
ASEAN Futsal Championship record
Year	Result	Pld	W	D	L	GF	GA
2001	Did not enter						
2003	Did not enter						
2005	Fifth place	6	1	0	5	12	35
2006	Group stage	3	0	0	3	13	23
2007	Fourth place	5	2	1	2	22	27
2008	Group stage	3	1	0	2	9	12
2009	Runners-up	4	2	1	1	28	8
2010	Third place	4	2	0	2	13	5
~~2011~~	Canceled						
2012	Runners-up	6	5	0	1	29	16
2013	Third place	6	4	0	2	26	19
2014	Third place	6	4	1	1	42	8
2015	Fourth place	6	3	0	3	44	21
2016	Pulled out from the tournament due to the internal reasons						
2017	Fourth place	6	4	1	1	52	10
2018	Fourth place	5	2	1	2	21	10
2019	Third place	5	3	1	1	13	7
~~2020~~	Canceled due to COVID-19 pandemic						
~~2021~~	Canceled						
2022	Third Place	5	2	2	1	15	7
2024	Runners-up	6	5	0	1	28	13
2026	Third place	5	3	0	2	19	8
Total:17/18	Runners-up	85	45	8	32	395	237

ASEAN Futsal Championship history
Season	Round	Opponent	Scores	Result	Venue
2005	Group Stage	Indonesia	2–5	Loss	Bangkok, Thailand
2005	Group Stage	Malaysia	1–6	Loss	Bangkok, Thailand
2005	Group Stage	Brunei	3–6	Loss	Bangkok, Thailand
2005	Group Stage	Thailand	2–13	Loss	Bangkok, Thailand
2005	Group Stage	Philippines	4–5	Loss	Bangkok, Thailand
2005	Fifth place play-off	Philippines	5–0	Won	Bangkok, Thailand
2006	Group stage	Indonesia	3–6	Loss	Bangkok, Thailand
2006	Group stage	Malaysia	4–9	Loss	Bangkok, Thailand
2006	Group stage	Cambodia	6–8	Loss	Bangkok, Thailand
2007	Group stage	Thailand	3–13	Loss	Bangkok, Thailand
2007	Group stage	Brunei	6–0	Won	Bangkok, Thailand
2007	Group stage	Myanmar	6–4	Won	Bangkok, Thailand
2007	Semi-finals	Australia	1–4	Loss	Bangkok, Thailand
2007	Third place play-off	Malaysia	6–6 a.e.t (pens. 7–9)	Loss	Bangkok, Thailand
2008	Group stage	Brunei	5–4	Won	Bangkok, Thailand
2008	Group stage	Laos	2–5	Loss	Bangkok, Thailand
2008	Group stage	Malaysia	2–3	Loss	Bangkok, Thailand
2009	Group stage	Philippines	3–0	Won	Ho Chi Minh City, Vietnam
2009	Group stage	Timor-Leste	21–1	Won	Ho Chi Minh City, Vietnam
2009	Semi-finals	Indonesia	3–3 a.e.t (pens. 8–7)	Won	Ho Chi Minh City, Vietnam
2009	Final	Thailand	1–4	Loss	Ho Chi Minh City, Vietnam
2010	Group stage	Myanmar	8–1	Won	Ho Chi Minh City, Vietnam
2010	Group stage	Philippines	4–0	Won	Ho Chi Minh City, Vietnam
2010	Group stage	Indonesia	1–2	Loss	Ho Chi Minh City, Vietnam
2010	Group stage	Malaysia	0–2	Loss	Ho Chi Minh City, Vietnam
2012	Group stage	Philippines	6–1	Won	Bangkok, Thailand
2012	Group stage	Myanmar	3–0	Won	Bangkok, Thailand
2012	Group stage	Cambodia	4–1	Won	Bangkok, Thailand
2012	Group stage	Malaysia	7–2	Won	Bangkok, Thailand
2012	Semi-finals	Indonesia	5–3	Won	Bangkok, Thailand
2012	Final	Thailand	4–9	Loss	Bangkok, Thailand
2013	Group stage	Malaysia	2–1	Won	Bangkok, Thailand
2013	Group stage	Philippines	10–1	Won	Bangkok, Thailand
2013	Group stage	Brunei	4–2	Won	Bangkok, Thailand
2013	Group stage	Thailand	2–6	Loss	Bangkok, Thailand
2013	Semi-finals	Australia	1–6	Loss	Bangkok, Thailand
2013	Third place play-off	Indonesia	7–3	Won	Bangkok, Thailand
2014	Group stage	Myanmar	6–1	Won	Shah Alam, Malaysia
2014	Group stage	Philippines	11–1	Won	Shah Alam, Malaysia
2014	Group stage	Laos	18–0	Won	Shah Alam, Malaysia
2014	Group stage	Thailand	2–0	Won	Shah Alam, Malaysia
2014	Semi-finals	Australia	3–4 (a.e.t.)	Loss	Shah Alam, Malaysia
2014	Third place play-off	Indonesia	2–2 a.e.t (pens. 3–1)	Won	Shah Alam, Malaysia
2015	Group stage	Laos	13–1	Won	Bangkok, Thailand
2015	Group stage	Myanmar	2–1	Won	Bangkok, Thailand
2015	Group stage	Philippines	19–1	Won	Bangkok, Thailand
2015	Group stage	Australia	5–6	Loss	Bangkok, Thailand
2015	Semi-finals	Thailand	0–6	Loss	Bangkok, Thailand
2015	Third place play-off	Malaysia	5–6	Loss	Bangkok, Thailand
2017	Group stage	Philippines	24–0	Won	Ho Chi Minh City, Vietnam
2017	Group stage	Indonesia	4–3	Won	Ho Chi Minh City, Vietnam
2017	Group stage	Brunei	18–0	Won	Ho Chi Minh City, Vietnam
2017	Group stage	Myanmar	3–0	Won	Ho Chi Minh City, Vietnam
2017	Semi-finals	Malaysia	1–5	Loss	Ho Chi Minh City, Vietnam
2017	Third place play-off	Myanmar	2–2 a.e.t (pens. 3–4)	Loss	Ho Chi Minh City, Vietnam
2018	Group stage	Brunei	9–0	Won	Yogyakarta, Indonesia
2018	Group stage	Timor-Leste	8–1	Won	Yogyakarta, Indonesia
2018	Group stage	Thailand	1–4	Loss	Yogyakarta, Indonesia
2018	Semi-finals	Malaysia	2–2 a.e.t (pens. 4–5)	Loss	Yogyakarta, Indonesia
2018	Third place play-off	Indonesia	1–3	Loss	Yogyakarta, Indonesia
2019	Group stage	Australia	2–0	Won	Ho Chi Minh City, Vietnam
2019	Group stage	Indonesia	0–0	Draw	Ho Chi Minh City, Vietnam
2019	Group stage	Malaysia	4–2	Won	Ho Chi Minh City, Vietnam
2019	Semi-finals	Thailand	0–2	Loss	Ho Chi Minh City, Vietnam
2019	Third place play-off	Myanmar	7–3	Won	Ho Chi Minh City, Vietnam
2022	Group stage	Myanmar	1–1	Draw	Bangkok, Thailand
2022	Group stage	Timor-Leste	7–1	Won	Bangkok, Thailand
2022	Group stage	Australia	5–1	Won	Bangkok, Thailand
2022	Semi-finals	Thailand	1–3	Loss	Bangkok, Thailand
2022	Third place play-off	Myanmar	1–1 a.e.t (pens. 4–1)	Won	Bangkok, Thailand
2024	Group stage	Timor-Leste	4–1	Won	Nakhon Ratchasima, Thailand
2024	Group stage	Malaysia	2–0	Won	Nakhon Ratchasima, Thailand
2024	Group stage	Brunei	14–0	Won	Nakhon Ratchasima, Thailand
2024	Group stage	Thailand	3–2	Won	Nakhon Ratchasima, Thailand
2024	Semi-finals	Australia	5–4 (a.e.t.)	Won	Nakhon Ratchasima, Thailand
2024	Final	Indonesia	0–2	Loss	Nakhon Ratchasima, Thailand
2026	Group stage	Myanmar	4–0	Won	Nonthaburi, Thailand
2026	Group stage	Timor-Leste	7–1	Won	Nonthaburi, Thailand
2026	Group stage	Thailand	2–4	Loss	Nonthaburi, Thailand
2026	Semi-finals	Indonesia	2–3	Loss	Nonthaburi, Thailand
2026	Third place play-off	Australia	4–0	Won	Nonthaburi, Thailand

=== Asian Indoor and Martial Arts Games ===
Asian Indoor and Martial Arts Games record
Year	Result	Pld	W	D*	L	GF	GA
2005	Did not enter						
2007	Group stage	3	1	0	2	6	10
2009	Group stage	3	0	1	2	9	18
2013	Group stage	2	1	1	0	4	1
2017	Quarter-finals	5	3	0	2	12	5
2021	Cancelled						
2026	To be determined						
Total	4/5	13	5	2	6	31	34

Asian Indoor and Martial Arts Games history
Season	Round	Opponent	Scores	Result	Venue
2007	Group stage	Hong Kong	5–1	Won	Macau
2007	Group stage	Uzbekistan	1–7	Loss	Macau
2007	Group stage	Japan	0–2	Loss	Macau
2009	Group stage	Malaysia	2–8	Loss	Ho Chi Minh City, Vietnam
2009	Group stage	Bahrain	4–4	Draw	Ho Chi Minh City, Vietnam
2009	Group stage	Jordan	3–6	Loss	Ho Chi Minh City, Vietnam
2013	Group stage	Palestine	4–1	Won	Incheon, South Korea
2013	Group stage	Lebanon	0–0	Draw	Incheon, South Korea
2017	Group stage	Chinese Taipei	1–2	Loss	Ashgabat, Turkmenistan
2017	Group stage	Hong Kong	8–0	Won	Ashgabat, Turkmenistan
2017	Group stage	Solomon Islands	2–1	Won	Ashgabat, Turkmenistan
2017	Group stage	Turkmenistan	1–0	Won	Ashgabat, Turkmenistan
2017	Quarter-finals	Uzbekistan	0–2	Loss	Ashgabat, Turkmenistan

=== Southeast Asian Games ===
Southeast Asian Games record
Year	Result	Pld	W	D*	L	GF	GA
2007	Group stage	2	0	0	2	3	6
2011	Silver	4	2	1	1	15	13
2013	Silver	4	2	0	2	14	14
2017	Bronze	4	2	1	1	12	7
2021	Bronze	4	2	1	1	12	4
2025	Fourth Place	4	2	0	2	8	8
Total	6/6	22	10	3	9	64	52

Southeast Asian Games history
Season	Round	Opponent	Scores	Result	Venue
2007	Group stage	Indonesia	1–2	Loss	Bangkok, Thailand
2007	Group stage	Laos	2–4	Loss	Bangkok, Thailand
2011	Group stage	Indonesia	2–2	Draw	Jakarta, Indonesia
2011	Group stage	Philippines	7–1	Won	Jakarta, Indonesia
2011	Semi-finals	Malaysia	3–2 (a.e.t)	Won	Jakarta, Indonesia
2011	Gold Medal Match	Thailand	3–8	Loss	Jakarta, Indonesia
2013	Group stage	Laos	10–1	Won	Naypyidaw, Myanmar
2013	Group stage	Thailand	0–4	Loss	Naypyidaw, Myanmar
2013	Semi-finals	Indonesia	3–1	Won	Naypyidaw, Myanmar
2013	Gold Medal Match	Thailand	1–8	Loss	Naypyidaw, Myanmar
2017	Group stage	Thailand	1–4	Loss	Shah Alam, Malaysia
2017	Group stage	Malaysia	1–1	Draw	Shah Alam, Malaysia
2017	Group stage	Myanmar	6–1	Won	Shah Alam, Malaysia
2017	Group stage	Indonesia	4–1	Won	Shah Alam, Malaysia
2021	Group stage	Indonesia	1–1	Draw	Hà Nam, Vietnam
2021	Group stage	Malaysia	7–1	Won	Hà Nam, Vietnam
2021	Group stage	Myanmar	4–0	Won	Hà Nam, Vietnam
2021	Group stage	Thailand	0–2	Loss	Hà Nam, Vietnam
2025	Group stage	Malaysia	2–4	Loss	Nonthaburi, Thailand
2025	Group stage	Indonesia	1–0	Won	Nonthaburi, Thailand
2025	Group stage	Thailand	1–2	Loss	Nonthaburi, Thailand
2025	Group stage	Myanmar	4–2	Won	Nonthaburi, Thailand

=== Grand Prix de Futsal ===
Grand Prix record
Year	Result	Pld	W	D*	L	GF	GA
2005	did not enter						
2006	did not enter						
2007	did not enter						
2008	did not enter						
2009	did not enter						
2010	did not enter						
2011	did not enter						
2013	did not enter						
2014	Sixth place	3	0	0	3	4	17
2015	did not enter						
2018	did not enter						
Total	1/11	3	0	0	3	4	17

Grand Prix de Futsal history
Season	Round	Opponent	Scores	Result	Venue
2013	Group Stage	Brazil	1–8	Loss	São Bernardo do Campo, Brazil
2013	Group Stage	Colombia	2–6	Loss	São Bernardo do Campo, Brazil
2013	Classification 5th–6th	Costa Rica	1–3	Loss	São Bernardo do Campo, Brazil

=== Friendly tournaments ===
Ho Chi Minh City Friendlies
Year	Result	Pld	W	D*	L	GF	GA
2013	Third place	3	1	0	2	5	7
2024	Third place	3	0	2	1	6	8
Total	0 titles	6	1	2	3	11	15

Ho Chi Minh City Friendlies history
Season	Round	Opponent	Scores	Result	Venue
2013	Round-robin	Japan	1–2	Loss	Ho Chi Minh City, Vietnam
2013	Round-robin	Thailand	1–3	Loss	Ho Chi Minh City, Vietnam
2013	Round-robin	Brazil	3–2	Won	Ho Chi Minh City, Vietnam
2024	Round-robin	New Zealand	2–2	Draw	Ho Chi Minh City, Vietnam
2024	Round-robin	Morocco	3–3	Draw	Ho Chi Minh City, Vietnam
2024	Round-robin	Iran	1–3	Loss	Ho Chi Minh City, Vietnam

JFA Friendlies
Year	Result	Pld	W	D*	L	GF	GA
2016	Third place	2	0	1	1	2	9
Total	0 titles	2	0	1	1	2	9

JFA Friendlies history
Season	Round	Opponent	Scores	Result	Venue
2016	Round-robin	Japan	0–7	Loss	Nagoya, Japan
2016	Round-robin	Uzbekistan	2–2	Draw	Nagoya, Japan

CFA Friendlies
Year	Result	Pld	W	D*	L	GF	GA
2016	Second place	3	1	1	1	7	8
2017	Third place	3	1	1	1	7	6
2018	Second place	3	2	0	1	13	6
Total	0 titles	9	4	2	3	27	20

CFA Friendlies history
Season	Round	Opponent	Scores	Result	Venue
2016	Round-robin	Ukraine	1–3	Loss	Changshu, China
2016	Round-robin	Mexico	4–3	Won	Changshu, China
2016	Round-robin	China	2–2	Draw	Changshu, China
2017	Round-robin	Croatia	1–3	Loss	Changshu, China
2017	Round-robin	China	4–3	Won	Changshu, China
2017	Round-robin	Netherlands	2–2	Draw	Changshu, China
2018	Round-robin	Russia	2–6	Loss	Changsha, China
2018	Round-robin	China	4–0	Won	Changsha, China
2018	Round-robin	New Zealand	7–0	Won	Changsha, China

*Denotes draws include knockout matches decided on penalty kicks.
**Gold background color indicates that the tournament was won.

== FIFA World Rankings ==
The Vietnam national futsal team is currently ranked 22nd (May 2026). The team's highest ranking is 20th on December 2025. The team's lowest ranking is 34th (November 2024)

== Head-to-head record ==
The record of Vietnam against other countries since the first official international match against Italy on 5 December 1997. Only official games were regarded.

As of matches played 10 November 2026

Team	Confederation	Pld	W	D	L	GF	GA	GD
Afghanistan	AFC	3	1	0	2	7	11	−4
Argentina	CONMEBOL	4	0	0	4	4	15	−11
Australia	AFC	12	5	2	5	37	37	0
Bahrain	AFC	2	1	1	0	6	5	+1
Bhutan	AFC	1	1	0	0	6	3	+3
Brazil	CONMEBOL	3	1	0	2	5	19	−14
Brunei	AFC	7	6	0	1	59	12	+47
Cambodia	AFC	5	3	1	1	33	16	+17
China	AFC	12	7	1	4	36	26	+10
Croatia	UEFA	3	0	0	3	7	17	−10
Colombia	CONMEBOL	1	0	0	1	2	6	-4
Costa Rica	CONCACAF	1	0	0	1	1	3	-2
Czech Republic	UEFA	1	0	1	0	1	1	0
Chinese Taipei	AFC	5	3	0	2	15	15	0
Egypt	CAF	2	0	1	1	4	7	-3
Finland	UEFA	1	0	0	1	2	4	-2
Guatemala	CONCACAF	2	1	1	0	7	5	+2
Hong Kong	AFC	4	3	1	0	23	3	+20
Hungary	UEFA	2	0	1	1	2	5	-3
Indonesia	AFC	18	6	6	6	42	39	+3
Iran	AFC	6	0	0	6	12	59	−47
Iraq	AFC	4	1	0	3	4	12	−8
Italy	UEFA	5	0	1	4	7	28	−21
Japan	AFC	8	0	1	7	9	29	−20
Jordan	AFC	1	0	0	1	3	6	−3
Kazakhstan	UEFA	2	1	1	0	6	3	+3
Kuwait	AFC	6	6	0	0	20	11	+9
Kyrgyzstan	AFC	5	0	1	4	8	15	-7
Laos	AFC	5	3	0	2	45	11	+34
Lebanon	AFC	6	3	3	0	13	3	+10
Morocco	CAF	2	0	1	1	4	5	−1
Malaysia	AFC	25	13	4	8	84	74	+10
Maldives	AFC	2	2	0	0	9	2	+7
Mexico	CONCACAF	1	1	0	0	4	3	+1
Mongolia	AFC	1	1	0	0	6	1	+5
Mozambique	CAF	1	1	0	0	3	1	+2
Myanmar	AFC	16	13	3	0	62	18	+44
Nepal	AFC	1	1	0	0	5	0	+5
Netherlands	UEFA	1	0	1	0	2	2	0
New Zealand	OFC	3	2	1	0	13	3	+ 10
Oman	AFC	1	1	0	0	3	1	+2
Palestine	AFC	1	1	0	0	4	1	+3
Panama	CONCACAF	1	1	0	0	3	2	+1
Paraguay	CONMEBOL	4	0	1	3	7	16	-9
Philippines	AFC	12	11	0	1	101	13	+84
Qatar	AFC	3	1	0	2	5	8	−3
Russia	UEFA	7	0	3	4	12	32	-20
Saudi Arabia	AFC	3	3	0	0	8	4	+4
Singapore	AFC	1	1	0	0	2	1	+1
Slovenia	UEFA	1	1	0	0	6	4	+2
South Korea	AFC	4	4	0	0	24	11	+13
Solomon Islands	OFC	3	3	0	0	12	1	+11
Spain	UEFA	3	0	0	3	3	13	−10
Tajikistan	AFC	2	2	0	0	18	5	+13
Thailand	AFC	25	2	1	22	34	131	−97
Timor-Leste	AFC	5	5	0	0	47	5	+42
Turkmenistan	AFC	2	1	0	1	1	2	−1
Ukraine	UEFA	1	0	0	1	1	3	−2
Uzbekistan	AFC	7	1	2	4	15	25	−10
Total		266	123	36	107	902	779	+123

== See also ==
- Vietnam U-20
- Vietnam U-17
- Vietnam women's team
- Futsal Cup Vietnam
- Vietnam League
