= 2012 AFC Futsal Championship qualification =

The 2012 AFC Futsal Championship qualification was held in late 2011 and early 2012 to determine 12 spots to the final tournament in United Arab Emirates. The teams finishing first, second and third in the 2010 AFC Futsal Championship, and the host nation for the 2012 competition, receive automatic byes to Finals.

== System ==
Twenty-seven teams registered in qualifying action for 12 places in the finals. Reigning champions Iran, runners-up Uzbekistan, Japan and 2012 edition hosts UAE have direct entry into the tournament proper.

== Qualified teams ==
Team	Qualified as	Qualification date	Appearance in finals
Uzbekistan	2010 AFC Futsal Championship Runners-up	28 May 2010	12th
Iran	2010 AFC Futsal Championship Winners	28 May 2010	12th
Japan	2010 AFC Futsal Championship Third place	30 May 2010	12th
United Arab Emirates	Host	2 July 2011	1st
Kyrgyzstan	South & Central Group	4 November 2011	12th
Tajikistan	South & Central Group	4 November 2011	7th
Turkmenistan	South & Central Group	4 November 2011	6th
South Korea	East Group Runners-up	17 November 2011	11th
China	East Group Winners	17 November 2011	9th
Chinese Taipei	East Group Third place	18 November 2011	9th
Qatar	West Group Winners	15 December 2011	2nd
Kuwait	West Group Runners-up	15 December 2011	10th
Lebanon	West Group Third place	16 December 2011	8th
Thailand	ASEAN Group Winners	25 February 2012	12th
Indonesia	ASEAN Group Runners-up	25 February 2012	8th
Australia	ASEAN Group Third place	26 February 2012	5th

== Zones ==
=== ASEAN ===
This zone was originally scheduled to take place from November 26 to December 1, 2011. However, the AFC announced on November 9 that it would be postponed due to the flood situation in Bangkok. It has been rescheduled from February 21 to 26, 2012.

All times are Indochina Time (ICT) – UTC+7

==== Group stage ====
===== Group A =====
Team	Pld	W	D	L	GF	GA	GD	Pts
Thailand	3	3	0	0	35	4	+31	9
Indonesia	3	2	0	1	20	7	+13	6
Philippines	3	1	0	2	4	30	−26	3
Myanmar	3	0	0	3	3	21	−18	0

Source: AFF
21 February 2012
16:30

Indonesia	12–0	Philippines
Silitonga 6', 34'; Bachri 10'; Hafid 12', 24'; Wardhana 17'; Handoyo 26'; Saptaji 28', 37', 39', 40'; Tamimy 31'	Report

Krungthep Thonburi Indoor Stadium, Bangkok
Attendance: 500
Referee: Vadim Baratov (Turkmenistan)

21 February 2012
19:00

Thailand	13–0	Myanmar
Chalaemkhet 3', 29'; Madyalan 8', 33'; Thueanklang 9', 25', 30', 36'; Wongkaeo 9', 17', 26'; Sornwichian 17', 37'	Report

Krungthep Thonburi Indoor Stadium, Bangkok
Attendance: 1,200
Referee: Abdulrahman Abdulqader (Bahrain)

22 February 2012
16:30

Myanmar	2–6	Indonesia
Aung Aung 3'; Than Wunna Aung 5'	Report	Gempur 7', 33'; Wardhana 8'; Arochman 23', 40'; Tamimy 37'

Krungthep Thonburi Indoor Stadium, Bangkok
Attendance: 450
Referee: Tomohiro Kozaki (Japan)

22 February 2012
19:00

Philippines	2–17	Thailand
Mallari 5'; Zerrudo 27'	Report	Madyalan 7', 16'; Chudech 9', 16', 36'; Wongkaeo 11', 19', 28', 28', 29', 29'; Thueanklang 13', 14', 26'; Chaemcharoen 15', 31'; Ratana 33'

Krungthep Thonburi Indoor Stadium, Bangkok
Attendance: 1,500
Referee: Husein Khalaileh (Jordan)

23 February 2012
17:00

Philippines	2–1	Myanmar
Mallari 21'; Ravelo 31'	Report	Tin Win Ko Ko 6'

Kiraves Indoor Stadium, Bangkok
Attendance: 100
Referee: Abdulrahman Abdulqader (Bahrain)

23 February 2012
17:00

Thailand	5–2	Indonesia
Penpakul 4'; Thueanklang 11'; Chudech 19', 31'; Sornwichian 36'	Report	Tamimy 2'; Silitonga 33'

Krungthep Thonburi Indoor Stadium, Bangkok
Attendance: 1,000
Referee: Vadim Baratov (Turkmenistan)

===== Group B =====
Team	Pld	W	D	L	GF	GA	GD	Pts
Vietnam	3	2	1	0	13	3	+10	7
Australia	3	1	2	0	21	6	+15	5
Malaysia	3	1	1	1	18	11	+7	4
Cambodia	3	0	0	3	4	36	−32	0

Source: AFF
21 February 2012
11:30

Australia	15–0	Cambodia
Adeli 3', 28', 36', 39', 40'; Basger 6', 23'; Giovenali 17', 23'; Zeballos 19'; Gomez 24'; Ngaluafe 27', 30', 38'; G. Cattanach 39'	Report

Krungthep Thonburi Indoor Stadium, Bangkok
Attendance: 1,000
Referee: Zhang Youze (China)

21 February 2012
14:00

Vietnam	4–0	Malaysia
Lưu Quỳnh Toàn 32'; Nguyễn Trọng Thiện 35', 38'; Đặng Phước Anh 39'	Report

Krungthep Thonburi Indoor Stadium, Bangkok
Attendance: 500
Referee: Kim Jang-kwan (South Korea)

22 February 2012
11:30

Malaysia	4–4	Australia
Kadir 11'; Alwee 21'; Zahari 38'; Hadzir 40'	Report	Adeli 1'; Wright 1'; Ngaluafe 20'; Giovenali 35'

Krungthep Thonburi Indoor Stadium, Bangkok
Attendance: 350
Referee: Naoki Miyatani (Japan)

22 February 2012
14:00

Cambodia	1–7	Vietnam
Phang Sunly 28'	Report	Huỳnh Bá Tuấn 10', 18'; Nguyễn Trọng Thiện 12'; Nguyễn Bảo Quân 20', 35'; Lưu Quỳnh Toàn 33', 40'

Krungthep Thonburi Indoor Stadium, Bangkok
Attendance: 400
Referee: Jasim Eidi (United Arab Emirates)

23 February 2012
14:00

Australia	2–2	Vietnam
Phung Trong Luan 13' (o.g.); Zeballos 32'	Report	Lưu Quỳnh Toàn 24'; Nguyễn Trọng Thiện 36'

Kiraves Indoor Stadium, Bangkok
Attendance: 300
Referee: Kim Jang-kwan (South Korea)

23 February 2012
14:00

Malaysia	14–3	Cambodia
Fariq 8', 31'; Harif 13', 26'; Bonyamin 16', 20'; Haris 22', 30', 38', 39'; Kadir 25', 40'; Mohamad 39'	Report	Haris 21' (o.g.); Ouk Rasin 36', 36'

Krungthep Thonburi Indoor Stadium, Bangkok
Attendance: 150
Referee: Nurdin Bukuev (Kyrgyzstan)

==== Knockout stage ====
Semi-finals
February 25 – Bangkok
Thailand	7
Australia	0
February 25 – Bangkok
Vietnam	1
Indonesia (aet)	2

Final
February 26 – Bangkok
Thailand	3
Indonesia	1
Third place
February 26 – Bangkok
Australia	4
Vietnam	3

===== Semi-finals =====
25 February 2012
14:00

Thailand	7–0	Australia
Thueanklang 4', 37', 40'; Chalaemkhet 9'; Madyalan 20'; Chaemcharoen 27'; Wongkaeo 40'	Report

Krungthep Thonburi Indoor Stadium, Bangkok
Attendance: 3,000
Referee: Nurdin Bukuev (Kyrgyzstan)

25 February 2012
17:00

Vietnam	1–2 (a.e.t.)	Indonesia
Lưu Quỳnh Toàn 47'	Report	Tamimy 44'; Silitonga 47'

Krungthep Thonburi Indoor Stadium, Bangkok
Attendance: 500
Referee: Vadim Baratov (Turkmenistan)

===== Third place play-off =====
26 February 2012
14:00

Australia	4–3	Vietnam
Ngaluafe 21', 23'; Seeto 30'; Giovenali 35'	Report	Nguyễn Trọng Thiện 36'; Lưu Quỳnh Toàn 37', 38'

Krungthep Thonburi Indoor Stadium, Bangkok
Attendance: 1,500
Referee: Kim Jang-kwan (South Korea)

===== Final =====
26 February 2012
17:00

Thailand	3–1	Indonesia
Thueanklang 6'; Chomboon 32'; Handoyo 39' (o.g.)	Report	Wardhana 22'

Krungthep Thonburi Indoor Stadium, Bangkok
Attendance: 5,000
Referee: Vadim Baratov (Turkmenistan)

=== East ===
Matches played in Malaysia from November 13 to November 18, 2011. All times are Malaysia Time (MYT) – UTC+8.

==== Group stage ====
===== Group A =====
Team	Pld	W	D	L	GF	GA	GD	Pts
South Korea	2	2	0	0	12	1	+11	6
Hong Kong	2	1	0	1	3	7	−4	3
Mongolia	2	0	0	2	1	8	−7	0

13 November 2011
16:30

South Korea	5–1	Mongolia
Shin Jong-hoon 3', 25', 38'; Seok Dae-sung 14'; Hwang Un 39'	Report	Tsatsral 28'

Cheras Indoor Stadium, Cheras
Attendance: 56
Referee: Trương Quốc Dũng (Vietnam)

14 November 2011
16:30

Hong Kong	3–0	Mongolia
Yip Tsz Chun 4'; Wong Chun Lam 24'; Chu Kwok Leung 38'	Report

Cheras Indoor Stadium, Cheras
Attendance: 70
Referee: Zulkifli Ahmad (Malaysia)

15 November 2011
16:30

South Korea	7–0	Hong Kong
Shin Jong-hoon 2', 6', 39'; Oh Hyun-jong 6', 31'; Seok Dae-sung 10'; Jeong Eui-hyun 14'	Report

Cheras Indoor Stadium, Cheras
Attendance: 55
Referee: Yasukazu Nobumoto (Japan)

===== Group B =====
Team	Pld	W	D	L	GF	GA	GD	Pts
China	2	2	0	0	15	1	+14	6
Chinese Taipei	2	1	0	1	12	7	+5	3
Macau	2	0	0	2	2	21	−19	0

13 November 2011
19:45

China	9–1	Macau
Zhang Xi 3'; Feng Wei 5', 14', 40'; Cong Lin 9', 19'; Zhao Liang 26'; Deng Tao 27'; Hu Jie 35'	Report	Cheung 38'

Cheras Indoor Stadium, Cheras
Attendance: 75
Referee: Christopher Colley (Australia)

14 November 2011
19:45

Chinese Taipei	12–1	Macau
Lo Chih-en 5', 14', 17', 28'; Lo Chih-an 15'; Hsieh Meng-husan 15'; Weng Wei-pin 23'; Chen Po-hao 24', 24', 27', 39'; Shih Shin-an 37'	Report	Leong Chong In 40'

Cheras Indoor Stadium, Cheras
Attendance: 45
Referee: Abdulrahman Abdulqader (Bahrain)

15 November 2011
19:45

China	6–0	Chinese Taipei
Feng Wei 3'; Zhao Liang 8'; Deng Tao 12', 26'; Hu Jie 16', 28'	Report

Cheras Indoor Stadium, Cheras
Attendance: 75
Referee: Abdulrahman Abdulqader (Bahrain)

==== Knockout stage ====
Semi-finals
November 17 – Cheras
South Korea	7
Chinese Taipei	3
November 17 – Cheras
China	8
Hong Kong	1

Final
November 18 – Cheras
South Korea	3
China (aet)	5
Third place
November 18 – Cheras
Chinese Taipei (aet)	5
Hong Kong	4

===== Semi-finals =====
17 November 2011
15:30

South Korea	7–3	Chinese Taipei
Jeong Eui-hyun 16'; Shin Jong-hoon 17', 19', 29'; Kim Sun-ho 24'; Jang Ming-yu 33'; Ha Jin-won 35'	Report	Lo Chih-en 16'; Weng Wei-pin 38'; Huang Cheng-tsung 40'

Cheras Indoor Stadium, Cheras
Attendance: 40
Referee: Rey Ritaga (Philippines)

17 November 2011
19:30

China	8–1	Hong Kong
Wang Wei 8'; Huang He 13'; Cong Lin 14', 25'; Liang Shuang 19', 28'; Deng Tao 23'; Zhang Xi 30'	Report	Yip Tsz Chun 39'

Cheras Indoor Stadium, Cheras
Attendance: 45
Referee: Christopher Colley (Australia)

===== Third place play-off =====
18 November 2011
15:30

Chinese Taipei	5–4 (a.e.t.)	Hong Kong
Lo Chih-an 6', 43'; Liu Chi-chao 22', 38'; Weng Wei-pin 49'	Report	Chow Ka Wa 8'; Yip Tsz Chun 26'; Lau Ka Shing 27'; Chu Kwok Leung 47'

Cheras Indoor Stadium, Cheras
Attendance: 40
Referee: Yasukazu Nobumoto (Japan)

===== Final =====
18 November 2011
19:30

South Korea	3–5 (a.e.t.)	China
Shin Jong-hoon 3'; Kim Sun-ho 4'; Oh Hyun-jong 32'	Report	Liang Shuang 24'; Zhang Xi 35', 36', 49'; Zhao Liang 41'

Cheras Indoor Stadium, Cheras
Attendance: 45
Referee: Trương Quốc Dũng (Vietnam)

=== South & Central ===
This zone was originally scheduled to take place from November 25 to 27, 2011 in Ashgabat, Turkmenistan. However, the Maldives withdrew in early November and the AFC Futsal Committee decided to award automatic qualification to the remaining teams; Kyrgyzstan, Tajikistan and Turkmenistan.

=== West ===
The matches will be played in Kuwait from December 9 to December 16, 2011.

==== Group stage ====
===== Group A =====
Team	Pld	W	D	L	GF	GA	GD	Pts
Qatar	4	4	0	0	32	9	+23	12
Kuwait	4	2	1	1	14	8	+6	7
Saudi Arabia	4	2	0	2	27	14	+13	6
Syria	4	1	1	2	25	19	+6	4
Palestine	4	0	0	4	7	55	−48	0

9 December 2011
17:30

Qatar	6–2	Syria
Bilal 2'; Rodriguinho 16', 32', 39'; Yousuf 29'; Raja 34'	Report	Al-Najjar 29'; Estanbolli 33'

Al-Qadsia SC Futsal Stadium, Kuwait City
Attendance: 200
Referee: Rey Ritaga (Philippines)

9 December 2011
20:30

Kuwait	3–1	Saudi Arabia
Al-Taweel 27'; Al-Mesned 28'; Hayat 31'	Report	A. Al-Dosari 39'

Al-Qadsia SC Futsal Stadium, Kuwait City
Attendance: 500
Referee: Scott Kidson (Australia)

10 December 2011
17:00

Saudi Arabia	16–1	Palestine
Al-Owaifi 3'; Al-Alouni 5', 27', 38'; Al-Shehri 13'; Al-Malki 19', 20'; A. Al-Dosari 23', 23', 25', 38'; Krinshi 29', 32'; Al-Ghanmi 31'; Al-Mujari 38', 39'	Report	Al-Osman 10'

Al-Qadsia SC Futsal Stadium, Kuwait City
Attendance: 50
Referee: Mohammed Al-Shidi (Oman)

10 December 2011
20:30

Syria	4–4	Kuwait
Dali 22', 40'; Estanbolli 35'; Faowall 39'	Report	Aman 7'; Al-Taweel 10'; Al-Mekaimi 19', 36'

Al-Qadsia SC Futsal Stadium, Kuwait City
Attendance: 600
Referee: Mahmoud Nassirloo (Iran)

11 December 2011
17:00

Palestine	1–18	Qatar
Al-Dakkak 16'	Report	Rodriguinho 1', 2', 6', 11', 32', 32'; Yousuf 2', 4', 31'; Mohssein 4', 5'; Obaid 7'; Diab 14' (o.g.); Raja 16', 33', 34', 39'; Bilal 21'

Al-Qadsia SC Futsal Stadium, Kuwait City
Attendance: 150
Referee: Samsudin Bin Ibrahim (Malaysia)

11 December 2011
20:30

Saudi Arabia	5–4	Syria
Al-Khaibari 12'; A. Al-Dosari 14'; Al-Malki 19', 23'; Al-Alouni 39'	Report	Al-Masalmeh 2'; Estanbolli 6', 8'; Alwan 30'

Al-Qadsia SC Futsal Stadium, Kuwait City
Attendance: 150
Referee: Christopher Colley (Australia)

12 December 2011
16:00

Qatar	6–5	Saudi Arabia
Bilal 13'; Rodriguinho 23', 35'; Mohssein 26'; Yousuf 32', 38'	Report	Al-Alouni 12', 28' (pen.); A. Al-Dosari 17'; Bin Ghadir 30'; Al-Owaifi 36'

Al-Qadsia SC Futsal Stadium, Kuwait City
Attendance: 80
Referee: Nurdin Bukuev (Kyrgyzstan)

12 December 2011
19:30

Palestine	1–6	Kuwait
Abu-Sahioun 27'	Report	Al-Mesned 8'; Al-Taweel 22'; Al-Mekaimi 23'; Al-Mosabehi 32'; Aman 34'; Al-Awadhi 38'

Al-Qadsia SC Futsal Stadium, Kuwait City
Attendance: 250
Referee: Vahid Arzpeima (Iran)

13 December 2011
16:00

Syria	15–4	Palestine
Faowall 12', 24', 34', 37'; Dali 17', 26', 29', 32', 38'; Al-Najjar 26', 28'; Al-Hantoush 28', 33', 35', 39'	Report	Al-Osman 5'; Yassine 31', 38'; Abu-Sahioun 31'

Al-Qadsia SC Futsal Stadium, Kuwait City
Attendance: 90
Referee: Yasukazu Nobumoto (Japan)

13 December 2011
19:30

Kuwait	1–2	Qatar
Al-Taweel 8'	Report	Raja 24'; Al-Eissaei 30'

Al-Qadsia SC Futsal Stadium, Kuwait City
Attendance: 300
Referee: Scott Kidson (Australia)

===== Group B =====
Team	Pld	W	D	L	GF	GA	GD	Pts
Iraq	3	2	1	0	10	4	+6	7
Lebanon	3	2	0	1	9	6	+3	6
United Arab Emirates	3	1	0	2	6	9	−3	3
Bahrain	3	0	1	2	5	11	−6	1

9 December 2011
16:00

Lebanon	3–1	United Arab Emirates
Takaji 6'; Zeitoun 8'; Serhan 23'	Report	Al-Marzouqi 38'

Al-Arabi SC Futsal Stadium, Kuwait City
Attendance: 100
Referee: Christopher Colley (Australia)

9 December 2011
19:00

Iraq	2–2	Bahrain
Bachay 37'; Mohsin 37'	Report	Abdulrazaq 25'; Radhi 33'

Al-Arabi SC Futsal Stadium, Kuwait City
Attendance: 50
Referee: Yasukazu Nobumoto (Japan)

10 December 2011
15:15

United Arab Emirates	1–4	Iraq
Ibrahim 10'	Report	Bachay 12'; Khalid 16'; Abd-Ali 34'; Duraid 40'

Al-Arabi SC Futsal Stadium, Kuwait City
Attendance: 50
Referee: Nurdin Bukuev (Kyrgyzstan)

10 December 2011
18:45

Bahrain	1–5	Lebanon
Radhi 2'	Report	Tneich 6', 34'; Kawsan 17'; Zeitoun 23'; Serhan 33'

Al-Arabi SC Futsal Stadium, Kuwait City
Attendance: 50
Referee: Vahid Arzpeima (Iran)

11 December 2011
15:15

Lebanon	1–4	Iraq
Itani 19'	Report	Khalid 5', 11'; Mohsin 24'; Abd-Ali 40'

Al-Arabi SC Futsal Stadium, Kuwait City
Attendance: 75
Referee: Mahmoud Nassirloo (Iran)

11 December 2011
18:45

Bahrain	2–4	United Arab Emirates
J. Saleh 10'; Yaber 21'	Report	Mahmood 4'; Salmeen 24', 37'; Jamil 36'

Al-Arabi SC Futsal Stadium, Kuwait City
Attendance: 50
Referee: Yasukazu Nobumoto (Japan)

==== Knockout stage ====
Semi-finals
December 15 – Kuwait City
Qatar (aet)	5
Lebanon	2
December 15 – Kuwait City
Iraq	1 (3)
Kuwait (p)	1 (4)

Final
December 16 – Kuwait City
Qatar (aet)	3
Kuwait	2
Third place
December 16 – Kuwait City
Lebanon	1
Iraq	0

===== Semi-finals =====
15 December 2011
16:00

Qatar	5–2 (a.e.t.)	Lebanon
Raja 16'; Rodriguinho 36', 45', 46', 47'	Report	Tneich 25', 34'

Al-Qadsia SC Futsal Stadium, Kuwait City
Attendance: 250
Referee: Nurdin Bukuev (Kyrgyzstan)

15 December 2011
20:00

Iraq	1–1 (a.e.t.)	Kuwait
Khalid 39'	Report	Al-Mekaimi 25'
Penalties
Abd-Ali (penalty scored); Mohsin (penalty missed); Jalal (penalty scored); Bachay (penalty missed); Khalid (penalty scored)	3–4	(penalty scored) Al-Taweel; (penalty scored) Al-Mosabehi; (penalty scored) Al-Mekaimi; (penalty missed) Al-Mesned; (penalty scored) Hayat

Al-Qadsia SC Futsal Stadium, Kuwait City
Attendance: 850
Referee: Mahmoud Nassirloo (Iran)

===== Third place play-off =====
16 December 2011
16:00

Lebanon	1–0	Iraq
Takaji 24'	Report

Al-Qadsia SC Futsal Stadium, Kuwait City
Attendance: 200
Referee: Scott Kidson (Australia)

===== Final =====
16 December 2011
20:00

Qatar	3–2 (a.e.t.)	Kuwait
Mohssein 3'; Raja 32'; Rodriguinho 46'	Report	Al-Taweel 9'; Bilal 38' (o.g.)

Al-Qadsia SC Futsal Stadium, Kuwait City
Attendance: 1,600
Referee: Nurdin Bukuev (Kyrgyzstan)
