= 2025 ASEAN U-16 Boys' Futsal Championship =

การแข่งขันฟุตซอลเยาวชนอายุไม่เกิน 16 ปี ชิงแชมป์อาเซียน 2025 (in Thai)

Tournament details
- Host country: Thailand
- City: Nonthaburi
- Dates: 23–29 December
- Teams: 5 (from 1 sub-confederation)
- Venue: 1 (in 1 host city)

Final positions
- Champions: Indonesia (1st title)
- Runners-up: Thailand
- Third place: Myanmar
- Fourth place: Vietnam

Tournament statistics
- Matches played: 12
- Goals scored: 83 (6.92 per match)

The 2025 ASEAN U-16 Boys' Futsal Championship was the first edition of the ASEAN U-16 Futsal Championship, the biennial international youth futsal championship organised by AFF for the men's under-16 national teams of Southeast Asia. The tournament was hosted at the Nonthaburi Gymnasium, Thailand from 22 to 28 December. A total of five nations participated in the final tournament, with players born on or after 1 January 2009 being eligible to participate.

Indonesia are the inaugural champions on this edition, defeating Thailand 4–3 in the final.

== Participating teams ==
The following teams participated for the final tournament.

Team
Thailand (H)
Vietnam
Brunei
Indonesia
Myanmar

== Squads ==
Each national team submitted a squad of 14 players, two of whom had to be goalkeepers.

== Group stage ==
The group winners and runners-up advance to the final, while the third and fourth place advance to the third place play-off.

Tiebreakers

In the group table, teams are ranked according to points (3 points for a win, 1 point for a draw, 0 points for a loss), and if tied on points, the following tiebreaking criteria are applied, in the order given, to determine the rankings):

1. Points in head-to-head matches among tied teams;
2. Goal difference in head-to-head matches among tied teams;
3. Goals scored in head-to-head matches among tied teams;
4. If more than two teams are tied, and after applying all head-to-head criteria above, a subset of teams are still tied, all head-to-head criteria above are reapplied exclusively to this subset of teams;
5. Goal difference in all group matches;
6. Goals scored in all group matches;
7. Penalty shoot-out if only two teams have the same number of points, and they met in the last round of the group and are tied after applying all criteria above (not used if more than two teams have the same number of points, or if their rankings are not relevant for qualification for the next stage);
8. Disciplinary points (red card = 3 points, yellow card = 1 point, expulsion for two yellow cards in one match = 3 points);
9. Drawing of lots.

All times are local, ICT (UTC+7)

Pos	Team	Pld	W	D	L	GF	GA	GD	Pts	Qualification
1	Thailand (H)	4	3	1	0	32	4	+28	10	Final
2	Indonesia	4	2	2	0	14	7	+7	8	Final
3	Vietnam	4	2	1	1	13	12	+1	7	Third place play-off
4	Myanmar	4	1	0	3	10	14	−4	3	Third place play-off
5	Brunei	4	0	0	4	4	36	−32	0	

Source: AFF
Rules for classification: Group stage tiebreakers
(H) Hosts
23 December 2025
11:30

Indonesia	4–2	Myanmar
Rizki 16'; Nurdiansyah 19'; Ibnu Alan 33'	Report	Lin Latt Htun 8'; Htet Wai Phyo 35'

Nonthaburi Gymnasium, Nonthaburi
23 December 2025
17:30

Thailand	20–0	Brunei
Wangsilpakhun 3', 5', 6', 36'; Petchtiam 3', 6', 10', 38'; Thanjue 4', 11', 13', 24', 25'; Srisuwan 18'; Srijuy 23'; Manoonphol 24'; Sriraksa 24'; Sunet 26', 38'; Phuwipadawat 40'	Report

Nonthaburi Gymnasium, Nonthaburi

24 December 2025
11:30

Vietnam	2–2	Indonesia
Nguyễn Bá Mạnh 29'; Nguyễn Trung Đức 39'	Report	Haerul 14', 27'

Nonthaburi Gymnasium, Nonthaburi
24 December 2025
17:30

Myanmar	0–4	Thailand
	Report	Sriraksa 10'; Phuwipadawat 16'; Srijuy 28'; Petchtiam 40'

Nonthaburi Gymnasium, Nonthaburi

25 December 2025
11:30

Indonesia	5–0	Brunei
Nurhayadi 7'; Gumilang 11', 25'; Haerul 12'; Alan 22'	Report

Nonthaburi Gymnasium, Nonthaburi
25 December 2025
17:30

Vietnam	5–2	Myanmar
Nguyễn Như Hoàng 6', 13'; Nguyễn Bá Mạnh 11'; Phan Trung Nghĩa 17'; Phan Văn Phát 33'	Report	Nay Lin Phyo 9', 10'

Nonthaburi Gymnasium, Nonthaburi

26 December 2025
15:30

Myanmar	6–1	Brunei

Nonthaburi Gymnasium, Nonthaburi
26 December 2025
18:00

Vietnam	1–5	Thailand

Nonthaburi Gymnasium, Nonthaburi

27 December 2025
11:00

Brunei	3–5	Vietnam

Nonthaburi Gymnasium, Nonthaburi
27 December 2025
13:30

Thailand	3–3	Indonesia

Nonthaburi Gymnasium, Nonthaburi

== Knockout stage ==
In the knockout stage, extra time and penalty shoot-out are used to decide the winner if necessary.

=== Bracket ===
Final
29 December – Nonthaburi
Thailand	3
Indonesia	4
Third place play-off
29 December – Nonthaburi
Vietnam	1
Myanmar	2

=== Third place play-off ===
29 December 2025
10:00

Vietnam	1–2	Myanmar

Nonthaburi Gymnasium, Nonthaburi

=== Final ===
29 December 2025
16:00

Thailand	3–4	Indonesia

Nonthaburi Gymnasium, Nonthaburi

== Winners ==
ASEAN U-16 Futsal Championship

Indonesia
1st title

== See also ==
- 2025 ASEAN U-19 Boys' Futsal Championship
