= Vietnam national under-17 futsal team =

Vietnam
- Association: Vietnam Football Federation (VFF)
- Confederation: AFC (Asia)
- Sub-confederation: AFF (Southeast Asia)
- Head coach: Trịnh Hữu Thành
- Captain: Phan Văn Phát
- Top scorer: Nguyễn Như Hoàng (3)
- Home stadium: Various
- FIFA code: VIE
First colours	Second colours

First international
- Vietnam 2–2 Indonesia (Nonthaburi, Thailand; 24 December 2025)

Biggest win
- Vietnam 5–2 Myanmar (Nonthaburi, Thailand; 25 December 2025)

Biggest defeat
- Vietnam 1–5 Thailand (Nonthaburi, Thailand; 26 December 2025)

ASEAN Championship
- Appearances: 1 (first in 2025)
- Best result: Fourth place (2025)

The Vietnam national under-16 and under-17 futsal team (Vietnamese: Đội tuyển futsal U-16 và U-17 Việt Nam) represents Vietnam at international youth futsal competitions for age under-16, and under-17. It is administered by the Vietnam Football Federation (VFF).

== Matches ==
The following is a list of match results in the last 12 months, as well as any future matches that have been scheduled.

Win Draw Loss Fixture

=== 2025 ===
24 December ASEAN Championship GS	Vietnam	2–2	Indonesia	Nonthaburi, Thailand
11:30 UTC+7	Nguyễn Bá Mạnh 29'; Nguyễn Trung Đức 31'	Report	Haerul 14', 27'	Stadium: Nonthaburi Sports Complex Gymnasium

25 December ASEAN Championship GS	Vietnam	5–2	Myanmar	Nonthaburi, Thailand
17:30 UTC+7	Nguyễn Như Hoàng 6', 13'; Nguyễn Bá Mạnh 11'; Phan Trung Nghĩa 17'; Phan Văn Phát 33'	Report	Nay Lin Phyo 9', 10'	Stadium: Nonthaburi Sports Complex Gymnasium

26 December ASEAN Championship GS	Vietnam	1–5	Thailand	Nonthaburi, Thailand
18:00 UTC+7				Stadium: Nonthaburi Sports Complex Gymnasium

27 December ASEAN Championship GS	Vietnam	5–3	Brunei	Nonthaburi, Thailand
11:00 UTC+7				Stadium: Nonthaburi Sports Complex Gymnasium

29 December ASEAN Championship third place play-off	Vietnam	1–2	Myanmar	Nonthaburi, Thailand
10:00 UTC+7 or 19:00 UTC+7				Stadium: Nonthaburi Sports Complex Gymnasium

== Coaching staff ==
Role	Name
Head coach	(Vietnam) Trịnh Hữu Thành
Physical coach	Vacant
Assistant coaches	(Vietnam) Huỳnh Tấn Quốc
Assistant coaches	(Vietnam) Khổng Đình Hùng
Interpreter	Vacant
Physiotherapist	Vacant

== Players ==
=== Current squad ===
The following 14 players were named in the final squad for the 2025 ASEAN U-16 Futsal Championship.

No.	Pos.	Player	Date of birth (age)	Club
	GK	Nguyễn Văn Lực		(Vietnam Football Federation) Thái Sơn Bắc
	GK	Nguyễn Minh Đức		(Vietnam Football Federation) Thái Sơn Bắc
	DF	Trần Tùng Lâm		(Vietnam Football Federation) Thái Sơn Bắc
	DF	Đỗ Mạnh Tiến		(Vietnam Football Federation) Thái Sơn Bắc
	DF	Phạm Anh Khôi		(Vietnam Football Federation) Thái Sơn Nam HCMC
	MF	Nguyễn Trung Đức		(Vietnam Football Federation) Thái Sơn Bắc
	MF	Bùi Gia Bảo		(Vietnam Football Federation) Thái Sơn Bắc
	MF	Võ Trần Quốc Dũng		(Vietnam Football Federation) Thái Sơn Nam HCMC
	MF	Nguyễn Như Hoàng		(Vietnam Football Federation) Thái Sơn Nam HCMC
	MF	Nguyễn Bá Mạnh		(Vietnam Football Federation) Thái Sơn Nam HCMC
	MF	Phan Trung Nghĩa		(Vietnam Football Federation) Thái Sơn Nam HCMC
	FW	Đỗ Đắc Đức		(Vietnam Football Federation) Thái Sơn Bắc
	FW	Nguyễn Bá Thanh Tú		(Vietnam Football Federation) Thái Sơn Nam HCMC
	FW	Phan Văn Phát (captain)		(Vietnam Football Federation) Thái Sơn Nam HCMC

=== Recent call-ups ===
The following players have also been called up to the squad within the last twelve months and remain eligible for selection.

Pos.	Player	Date of birth (age)	Caps	Goals	Club	Latest call-up
GK	Đỗ Đức Anh		-	-	(Vietnam) Thái Sơn Bắc	2025 ASEAN U-16 Futsal Championship^{PRE}
GK	Vũ Minh Hiếu		-	-	(Vietnam) Thái Sơn Bắc	2025 ASEAN U-16 Futsal Championship^{PRE}
MF	Nguyễn Ngọc Long		-	-	(Vietnam) Thái Sơn Bắc	2025 ASEAN U-16 Futsal Championship^{PRE}
MF	Hà Thành Duy		-	-	(Vietnam) Thái Sơn Bắc	
MF	Huỳnh Đức Phát		-	-	(Vietnam) Thái Sơn Nam HCMC	2025 ASEAN U-16 Futsal Championship^{PRE}
MF	Vũ Xuân Hải		-	-	(Vietnam) Thái Sơn Nam HCMC	2025 ASEAN U-16 Futsal Championship^{PRE}
^{INJ} Player withdrew from the squad due to an injury.^{PRE} Preliminary squad.^{OTH} Player withdrew from the squad due to other reasons.^{SUS} Serving suspension

== Competititive records ==
ASEAN U-16 Futsal Championship record
Year	Round	Position	Pld	W	D*	L	GF	GA
(Thailand) 2025	Fourth Place	4th	5	2	1	2	14	14
Total	Fourth Place	1/1	5	2	1	2	14	14

*Denotes draws include knockout matches decided on penalty kicks.
**Round = Group stage or Round of 16 or Quarter-finals or Semi-finals or Final.

ASEAN U-16 Futsal Championship records
Year	Round	Opponent	Score	Result	Venue
2025	Group stage	Indonesia	2–2	Draw	Nonthaburi, Thailand
2025	Group stage	Myanmar	5–2	Won	Nonthaburi, Thailand
2025	Group stage	Thailand	1–5	Loss	Nonthaburi, Thailand
2025	Group stage	Brunei	5–3	Won	Nonthaburi, Thailand
2025	Third place play-off	Myanmar	1–2	Loss	Nonthaburi, Thailand

== See also ==
- Vietnam's team
- Vietnam U-20
- Futsal Cup Vietnam
- Vietnam League
