= Futsal at the 2025 SEA Games – Men's tournament =

2025 Men's SEA Games Futsal Tournament

Tournament details
- Host country: Thailand
- Dates: 15–19 December
- Teams: 5 (from 1 sub-confederation)
- Venue: 1 (in 1 host city)

Final positions
- Champions: Indonesia (1st title)
- Runners-up: Thailand
- Third place: Malaysia
- Fourth place: Vietnam

Tournament statistics
- Matches played: 10
- Goals scored: 52 (5.2 per match)

The futsal tournament at the 2025 SEA Games was held in 15 to 19 December. It was the 6th edition of the men's SEA Games futsal tournament.

Thailand are the five-time defending champions, having won the title in five editions of the tournament, but they have officially become former champions after losing 1–6 to Indonesia in the last match, which left them with an inferior goal difference after the single round-robin stage. This defeat marked the first time in history that they failed to win the tournament’s gold medal, as well as their first-ever failure on home soil.

== Competition schedule ==
The following was the competition schedule for the men's futsal competitions:

Legend
RR	Round robin

Sun 15	Mon 16	Tue 17	Wed 18	Thu19
RR	RR	RR	RR	RR

== Venue ==
Nonthaburi
Nonthaburi Sports Complex Gymnasium
Capacity: 4,000
Futsal at the 2025 SEA Games – Men's tournament (Thailand)

== Participating nations ==
The following five teams participated for the competition.

- Indonesia (INA)
- Malaysia (MAS)
- Myanmar (MYA)
- Thailand (THA)
- Vietnam (VIE)

== Squads ==
The team has to name a final squad of 14 players (two of whom must be goalkeepers).

== Draw ==
There is no official draw due to only 5 teams participating in this competition. All teams are automatically drawn to one group.

== Competition format ==
- Round robin; the team with the best record wins the gold medal.

== Table ==
Pos	Team	Pld	W	D	L	GF	GA	GD	Pts	Final Result
1	Indonesia (C)	4	3	0	1	13	4	+9	9	Gold medal
2	Thailand (H)	4	3	0	1	13	8	+5	9	Silver medal
3	Malaysia	4	2	0	2	14	12	+2	6	Bronze medal
4	Vietnam	4	2	0	2	8	8	0	6	
5	Myanmar	4	0	0	4	4	20	−16	0	

Source: VFF
(C) Champions; (H) Hosts

=== Matches ===
All times are local, ICT (UTC+7).

15 December 2025
16:00

Indonesia	5–1	Myanmar
Israr Megantara 2'; Iqbal Iskandar 8', 9'; Rizki Xavier 32'; Syauqi Saud 39'	Report	Min Khant Thu 10'

Nonthaburi Sports Complex Gymnasium, Nonthaburi
15 December 2025
19:00

Thailand	7–1	Malaysia
Worasak Sriharangpairoj 1'; Chaowala Sriawut 7'; Muhammad Osamanmusa 12', 20', 37'; Athipong Munplai 38'; Ronachai Choongwongsook 38'	Report	Awaluddin Mat Nawi 12'

Nonthaburi Sports Complex Gymnasium, Nonthaburi

16 December 2025
16:00

Malaysia	4–2	Vietnam
Harith Naim 4'; Syahir Iqbal Khan 7', 21'; Awaluddin Mat Nawi 18'	Report	Nguyễn Đa Hải 3'; Nguyễn Mạnh Dũng 37'

Nonthaburi Sports Complex Gymnasium, Nonthaburi
Referee: Sukhrob Sattorov (Tajikistan)
16 December 2025
19:00

Myanmar	0–3	Thailand
	Report	Itticha Prapaphan 14'; Sarawut Phalaphruek 22'; Athipong Munphla 23'

Nonthaburi Sports Complex Gymnasium, Nonthaburi
Referee: Ali Ahmadi (Iran)

17 December 2025
16:00

Vietnam	1–0	Indonesia
Từ Minh Quang 11'	Report

Nonthaburi Sports Complex Gymnasium, Nonthaburi
Referee: Ahmad Al Daou (Lebanon)
17 December 2025
19:00

Malaysia	8–1	Myanmar
Mo Myint Soe 3' (o.g.); Awaluddin Mat Nawi 7'; Harith Naim 13'; Danial Dain 14'; Firdaus Ambiah 17'; Syahir Iqbal Khan 18', 28'; Syed Shahrul Nizam 39'	Report	Naing Linn Tun Kyaw 16'

Nonthaburi Sports Complex Gymnasium, Nonthaburi
Referee: Rawand Fattah Rashid (Iraq)

18 December 2025
16:00

Indonesia	2–1	Malaysia
Evan Soumilena 4'; Reza Gunawan 13'	Report	Brian Ick 17' (o.g.)

Nonthaburi Sports Complex Gymnasium, Nonthaburi
18 December 2025
19:00

Vietnam	1–2	Thailand
Nguyễn Đa Hải 30'	Report	Muhammad Osamanmusa 15'; Itticha Praphaphan 29'

Nonthaburi Sports Complex Gymnasium, Nonthaburi
Referee: Yahya Alathwani (Saudi Arabia)

19 December 2025
16:00

Myanmar	2–4	Vietnam
Min Khant Thu 31'; Naing Linn Tun Kyaw 40'	Report	Nguyễn Đa Hải 25', 33'; Trịnh Công Đại 36'; Vũ Ngọc Ánh 38'

Nonthaburi Sports Complex Gymnasium, Nonthaburi
Referee: Moon Dae-sung (South Korea)
19 December 2025
19:00

Thailand	1–6	Indonesia
Krit Aransanyalak 37'		Firman Adriansyah 13' (pen.); Syauqi Saud 17'; Samuel Eko 23'; Rizki Amanda 29'; Ardiansyah Nur 35', 39'

Nonthaburi Sports Complex Gymnasium, Nonthaburi
Referee: Lee Po-fu (Chinese Taipei)

== See also ==
- Women's tournament
