= ASEAN U-16 Boys' Futsal Championship =

- Organiser(s): AFF
- Founded: 2025
- Region: Southeast Asia
- Teams: 5
- Current champions: Indonesia
- Most championships: Indonesia (1 title)
- 2025 ASEAN U-16 Boys' Futsal Championship

The ASEAN U-16 Boys' Futsal Championship is the main futsal competition of the under-16 national futsal teams governed by the AFF (ASEAN Football Federation).

The tournament is held every two years, with the first final tournament held in December 2025 in Thailand and featuring seven teams.

Indonesia are the inaugural champions on the 2025 edition, defeating Thailand 4–3 in the final.

== Results ==
Year	Host	Final			Third place match		
Year	Host	Winner	Score	Runner-up	Third place	Score	Fourth place
2025; Details	Nonthaburi, Thailand	Indonesia	4–3	Thailand	Myanmar	2–1	Vietnam

== Statistics ==
=== Performances by countries ===
Team	Winners	Runners-up	Third place	Fourth place	Total (Top Four)
Indonesia	1 (2025)				1
Thailand		1 (2025)			1
Myanmar			1 (2025)		1
Vietnam				1 (2025)	1

=== Participating details ===
Legend

- 1st – Champions
- 2nd – Runners-up
- 3rd – Third place
- 4th – Fourth place
- GS – Group stage
- Q – Participated for upcoming tournament
- — Hosts
- • – Did not qualify
- × – Did not enter
- × – Withdrew before qualification / Banned

Teams	2025 (5)	Total
Thailand	2nd	1
Vietnam	4th	1
Brunei	GS	1
Indonesia	1st	1
Myanmar	3rd	1

== See also ==
- ASEAN Futsal Championship
- ASEAN Women's Futsal Championship
- ASEAN U-19 Boys' Futsal Championship
- AFF Futsal Club Championship
