= Bruno García Formoso =

Spanish futsal manager

Personal information
- Full name: Bruno García Formoso
- Date of birth: 6 June 1974 (age 52)
- Place of birth: Spain

Managerial career
- Years: Team
- 2013: Peru (futsal)
- 2013–2016: Vietnam (futsal)
- 2016–2021: Japan (futsal)

Bruno García Formoso (born 6 June 1974) is a Spanish futsal coach.

== Career ==
García started his managerial career with Peru. After that, he coached Vietnam and led them to their first World Cup.

In 2016, García was appointed as the head coach of the Japan national futsal team. After the 2021 FIFA Futsal World Cup, he resigned. Kenichiro Kogure took his former position since then.
