= 2008 AFF Futsal Championship =

AFF Futsal Championship Bangkok 2008

Tournament details
- Host country: Thailand
- City: Bangkok
- Dates: 27–31 August
- Teams: 8 (from 1 confederation)
- Venue: 1 (in 1 host city)

Final positions
- Champions: Thailand (6th title)
- Runners-up: Indonesia
- Third place: Malaysia
- Fourth place: Brunei

Tournament statistics
- Matches played: 16
- Goals scored: 114 (7.13 per match)
- Top scorer(s): (Indonesia) Topas Pamungkas (7 goals)
- Best player: (Thailand) Suphawut Thueanklang

The 2008 AFF Futsal Championship was held in Bangkok, Thailand from 27 to 31 August 2008.

Hosts Thailand have sent their under-21 team for this tournament as their senior team were preparing for the FIFA Futsal World Cup. While Laos are making their debut in this competition.

== Tournament ==
- All times are Thailand Standard Time (TST) - UTC+7

=== Group stage ===
==== Group A ====
| Team | Pld | W | D | L | GF | GA | GD | Pts |
|---|---|---|---|---|---|---|---|---|
| Indonesia | 3 | 3 | 0 | 0 | 14 | 3 | +11 | 9 |
| Thailand | 3 | 2 | 0 | 1 | 13 | 9 | +4 | 6 |
| Myanmar | 3 | 1 | 0 | 2 | 10 | 13 | −3 | 3 |
| Philippines | 3 | 0 | 0 | 3 | 6 | 18 | −11 | 0 |

27 August 2008
14:00

| Indonesia | 4 – 2 | Myanmar |
|---|---|---|
| Topas Pamungkas 15', 39'; Afif Taminy 16'; Jaelani Ladjanibi 28' | Report | Aung Moe 3'; Maung Maung Myint 17' |

Nimibutr Stadium, Bangkok

27 August 2008
18:00

| Thailand | 5 – 4 | Philippines |
|---|---|---|
| Jirawat Sornwichian 4'; Thanakorn Penpakul 5'; Suphawut Thueanklang 15', 35'; Jadet Punpoem 17' | Report | Misagh Bahardoran 3'; Ariel Zerrudo 24', 28' unknown 25' |

Nimibutr Stadium, Bangkok

28 August 2008
14:00

| Philippines | 0 – 7 | Indonesia |
|---|---|---|
| | Report | Ariel Zerrudo 4' (o.g.); Deny Handoyo 6'; Sukma Nagara 25'; Fachry Assegaf 28'; Topas Pamungkas 29'; Achmad Syaibani 33', 35' |

Nimibutr Stadium, Bangkok

28 August 2008
18:00

| Myanmar | 2 – 7 | Thailand |
|---|---|---|
| Aung Moe 5'; Soe Min Oo 14' | Report | Kritsada Wongkaeo 2', 31'; Thanakorn Penpakul 6'; Jadet Punpoem 8', 24'; Nuttapun Namboonmee 23'; Nattawut Kongnimit 25' |

Nimibutr Stadium, Bangkok

29 August 2008
14:00

| Myanmar | 6 – 2 | Philippines |
|---|---|---|
| Aung Kyaw Oo 12'; Soe Min Oo 15'; Maung Maung Myint 25', 32'; Aung Moe 30'; Min Oo 32' | Report | Ali Go 22'; Misagh Bahadoran 23' |

Nimibutr Stadium, Bangkok

29 August 2008
16:00

| Thailand | 1 – 3 | Indonesia |
|---|---|---|
| Kritsada Wongkaeo 1' | Report | Maulana Ihsan 8'; Topas Pamungkas 18', 36' |

Nimibutr Stadium, Bangkok
Referee: Junaidi Serudin (Brunei)

==== Group B ====
| Team | Pld | W | D | L | GF | GA | GD | Pts |
|---|---|---|---|---|---|---|---|---|
| Malaysia | 3 | 3 | 0 | 0 | 14 | 5 | +9 | 9 |
| Brunei | 3 | 1 | 0 | 2 | 11 | 13 | −2 | 3 |
| Vietnam | 3 | 1 | 0 | 2 | 9 | 12 | −3 | 3 |
| Laos | 3 | 1 | 0 | 2 | 8 | 12 | −4 | 3 |

27 August 2008
12:00

| Malaysia | 4 – 2 | Laos |
|---|---|---|
| Jamhauri Zainuddin 15'; Safar Mohamad 26'; Addie Azwan Zainal 31'; Mohd Saiful Mohd Noor 37' | Report | Anakone Sayakone 13'; Vidalack Souvanhavongsa 39' |

Nimibutr Stadium, Bangkok

27 August 2008
16:00

| Vietnam | 5 – 4 | Brunei |
|---|---|---|
| Truong Quoc Tuan 22'; Huynh Ba Tuan 25', 27'; Pham Minh Giang 31'; Noor Karim 35' (o.g.) | Report | Mohd Shahril Ismail 3'; Faizul Zainy 21', 24'; Jasriman Johari 38' |

Nimibutr Stadium, Bangkok

28 August 2008
12:00

| Laos | 5 – 2 | Vietnam |
|---|---|---|
| Valasine Dalaphone 7'; Anakone Sayakone 14'; Phetsamay Thongmany 23'; Etdy Douangmatphon 35'; Phonepaseuth Sysoutham 39' | Report | Truong Quoc Tuan 9'; Nguyen Quang Minh 38' |

Nimibutr Stadium, Bangkok

28 August 2008
16:00

| Brunei | 1 – 7 | Malaysia |
|---|---|---|
| Ranozakhran Tajuddin 9' | Report | Mohd Ruzaley 11', 31'; Mohd Fadhil Yusoff 16', 25'; Muizzuddin Mohd Haris 20'; Addie Azwan Zainal 24'; Ahmad Hanif Sarmin 36' |

Nimibutr Stadium, Bangkok

29 August 2008
12:00

| Vietnam | 2 – 3 | Malaysia |
|---|---|---|
| Nguyen Quang Minh 25'; Truong Quoc Tuan 35' | Report | Mohd Fadhil Yusoff 7'; Mohd Fadhil Karnim 14'; Addie Azwan Zainal 39' |

Nimibutr Stadium, Bangkok

29 August 2008
18:00

| Brunei | 6 – 1 | Laos |
|---|---|---|
| Asrul Asdynee Sahdon 18', 19'; Mohd Hardyman Lamit 33', 34'; Jasriman Johari 36', 39' | Report | Valasine Dalaphone 14' |

Nimibutr Stadium, Bangkok

=== Bracket ===
Semi-finals
30 August – Bangkok
Indonesia | 8
Brunei | 1
30 August – Bangkok
Thailand | 4
Malaysia | 0

Final
31 August – Bangkok
Indonesia | 1
Thailand | 5
Third place
31 August – Bangkok
Brunei | 2
Malaysia | 8

==== Semi-finals ====
30 August 2008
14:00

| Indonesia | 8 – 1 | Brunei |
|---|---|---|
| Sayan Karmadi 3', 18'; Afif Tamimy 14', 25'; Topas Pamungkas 19', 38'; Deny Handoyo 29', 32' | Report | Muhammad Hardyman Lamit 29' |

Nimibutr Stadium, Bangkok

30 August 2008
16:00

| Thailand | 4 – 0 | Malaysia |
|---|---|---|
| Nattawut Kongnimit 31'; Suphawut Thueanklang 36'; Nattawut Madyalan 38'; Kritsada Wongkaeo 39' | Report |

Nimibutr Stadium, Bangkok

==== Third place play-off ====
31 August 2008
14:00

| Brunei | 2 – 8 | Malaysia |
|---|---|---|
| unknown 22' unknown 35' | Report | Ahmad Hanif Karnim 4', 5', 23'; N. Saravanan 6'; Safar Mohamad 10'; Mohd Fadhil Yusoff 20', 38', 39' |

Nimibutr Stadium, Bangkok

==== Final ====
31 August 2008
16:30

| Thailand | 5 – 1 | Indonesia |
|---|---|---|
| Suphawut Thueanklang 6', 20', 27'; Jirawat Sornwichian ?'; Kritsada Wongkaeo ?' | Report | Deny Handoyo 35' |

Nimibutr Stadium, Bangkok

== Winner ==
2008 ASEAN Futsal Championship winners

Thailand
6th title

== Goalscorers ==
7 goals

- (Indonesia) Topas Pamungkas

6 goals

- (Malaysia) Mohd Fadhil Yusoff
- (Thailand) Suphawut Thueanklang

5 goals

- (Thailand) Kritsada Wongkaeo

4 goals

- (Indonesia) Deny Handoyo
- (Malaysia) Mohd Fadhil Karnim

3 goals

- (Brunei) Jasriman Johari
- (Brunei) Mohd Hardyman Lamit
- (Indonesia) Afif Taminy
- (Malaysia) Addie Azwan Zainal
- (Myanmar) Aung Moe
- (Myanmar) Maung Maung Myint
- (Thailand) Jadet Punpoem
- (Vietnam) Truong Quoc Tuan

2 goals

- (Brunei) Faizul Zainy
- (Brunei) Asrul Asdynee Sahdon
- (Indonesia) Achmad Syaibani
- (Indonesia) Sayan Karmadi
- (Laos) Anakone Sayakone
- (Laos) Valasine Dalaphone

2 goals

- (Malaysia) Safar Mohamad
- (Malaysia) Mohd Ruzaley
- (Myanmar) Soe Min Oo
- (Philippines) Misagh Bahadoran
- (Philippines) Ariel Zerrudo
- (Thailand) Jirawat Sornwichian
- (Thailand) Thanakorn Penpakul
- (Thailand) Nattawut Kongnimit
- (Vietnam) Huynh Ba Tuan
- (Vietnam) Nguyen Quang Minh

1 goal

- (Brunei) unknown
- (Brunei) unknown
- (Brunei) Mohd Shahril Ismail
- (Brunei) Ranozakhran Tajuddin
- (Indonesia) Jaelani Ladjanibi
- (Indonesia) Sukma Nagara
- (Indonesia) Fachry Assegaf
- (Indonesia) Maulana Ihsan
- (Laos) Vidalack Souvanhavongsa
- (Laos) Phetsamay Thongmany
- (Laos) Etdy Douangmatphon
- (Laos) Phonepaseuth Sysoutham
- (Malaysia) Jamhauri Zainuddin
- (Malaysia) Mohd Saiful Mohd Noor
- (Malaysia) Muizzuddin Mohd Haris

1 goal

- (Malaysia) Ahmad Hanif Sarmin
- (Malaysia) N. Saravanan
- (Myanmar) Aung Kyaw Oo
- (Myanmar) Min Oo
- (Philippines) Ali Go
- (Philippines) unknown
- (Thailand) Nuttapun Namboonmee
- (Thailand) Nattawut Madyalan
- (Vietnam) Pham Minh Giang

Own goal

- (Brunei) Noor Karim (for Vietnam)
- (Philippines) Ariel Zerrudo (for Indonesia)
