= Ariel Zerrudo =

Filipino footballer

Personal information
- Full name: Ariel Zerrudo, Jr.
- Date of birth: May 10, 1981 (age 45)
- Place of birth: Manila, Philippines
- Position: Midfielder

Senior career*
Years	Team	Apps	(Gls)
–2008	Lateo		
2008–2012	Pasargad		
2012	Pachanga		

International career
–	Philippines	9	(1)
–	Philippines (futsal)		
- * Club domestic league appearances and goals

Ariel Zerrudo is a Filipino footballer who has played for the Philippines national football team.

== Career ==
Zerrudo played for the Philippines at the 2004 AFF Championship. He was also part of the Philippine squad that participated in the 2007 AFF Championship qualifiers, where he scored a goal in the 7–0 rout of Timor Leste. He was part of the squad that participated in the final tournament.

He also played for the Philippines national futsal team that played at the 2007, 2008, and 2010 AFF Futsal Championships. He also played in the 2012 AFC Futsal Championship qualifiers.
