= Gurbanguly Aşyrow =

Turkmen footballer

Gurbanguly Ashirov
Personal information
- Full name: Gurbanguly Muratgulyewiç Aşyrow
- Date of birth: 20 February 1993 (age 33)
- Place of birth: Akbugdaý, Akbugdaý District, Ahal Region, Turkmenistan
- Position: Defender

Team information
- Current team: FC Ahal
- Number: 3

Senior career*
Years	Team	Apps	(Gls)
2017–	Ahal	?	(?)

International career^{‡}
2017–	Turkmenistan	1	(0)
- * Club domestic league appearances and goals as of 25 December 2019 ‡ National team caps and goals as of 25 December 2019

Gurbanguly Myratgulyyevich Ashirov (Turkmen: Gurbanguly Muratgulyewiç Aşyrow; born 20 February 1993) is a Turkmen professional footballer who plays for FC Ahal. He was part of the Turkmenistan national team from 2017.

== Club career ==
In recent years, he has been playing for the Ahal.

== International career ==
He played for Turkmenistan futsal team at 2013 Asian Indoor and Martial Arts Games and 2016 AFC Futsal Championship qualification.

Ashirov made his senior national team debut on 28 August 2017, in a friendly match against Qatar.
