= Ekaterina Salnikova =

Russian chemist

- Екатерина Сальникова
- Born: Ekaterina Andreyevna Salnikova; 8 December 1928; Shevaldino, Usolsky District, Perm Krai, Russian Soviet Federative Socialist Republic
- Died: 3 October 2016 (aged 87)
- Occupation: Chemist
- Years active: 1943–1976
- Awards: Medal "For Distinguished Labour"; Medal "For Labour Valour"; Order of the Badge of Honour; Jubilee Medal "In Commemoration of the 100th Anniversary of the Birth of Vladimir Ilyich Lenin"; Hero of Socialist Labour; Order of Lenin

Ekaterina Andreyevna Salnikova (Russian: Екатерина Андреевна Сальникова; 8 December 1928 – 3 October 2016) was a Russian chemist working at the Berezniki Nitrogen and Fertilizer Plant. She was a gas welder's apprentice, a operator in the contact section, foreman in the catalyst mesh restoration department and then as a catalysis engineer and process engineer before retiring in 1976. Salnikova was a member of the Central Auditing Commission of the Communist Party of the Soviet Union and a candidate member of the Central Committee of the Communist Party of the Soviet Union. She was awarded the Medal "For Distinguished Labour"; the Medal "For Labour Valour"; the Order of the Badge of Honour; the Jubilee Medal "In Commemoration of the 100th Anniversary of the Birth of Vladimir Ilyich Lenin"; the Order of Lenin and the title of Hero of Socialist Labour.

== Biography ==
Salnikova was born in the village of Shevaldino, now Usolsky District, Perm Krai on 8 December 1928. In 1943, during the Great Patriotic War, she started her career as a gas welder's apprentice at the Berezniki Nitrogen and Fertilizer Plant, Berezniki before becoming a heat-exchange boiler stoker. As she continued working, Salinkova While finished high school, vocational school, and a two-year course at a master's school. She did welding on automobiles and operated heat-exchange machines. From August 1950, Salinikova worked as an operator in the contact section of the Berezniki Nitrogen and Fertilizer Plant.

Between 1968 and 1976, she was a senior worker at the Berezniki Nitrogen and Fertiliser Plant (foreman in the catalyst mesh restoration department and then as a catalysis engineer and process engineer) before retiring in 1976. Salnikova was a participant in the introduction of new types of catalysts into production and the development of new units, the inclusion of which in the production process enabled the plant to significantly reduce the costs of producing the product. Her team successfully implemented several of their own ideas, seeing significant economic benefits.

She became a member of the Communist Party of the Soviet Union in 1957. Salinikova was appointed a member of the Central Auditing Commission of the Communist Party of the Soviet Union by the 23rd Congress of the Communist Party of the Soviet Union and was in the role between 1966 and 1971. She was a delegate to both the 23rd Congress of the Communist Party of the Soviet Union in 1966 and 24th Congress of the Communist Party of the Soviet Union in 1971. Salinikova was a candidate member of the Central Committee of the Communist Party of the Soviet Union from 1971 to 1976. Further, she was an elected member of the Perm Regional Committee and the Berezniki City Committee of the CPSU.

== Personal life ==
Salnikova was married to Yakov Aleksandrovich Salnikov for 50 years. She was resident in Berezniki and died on 3 October 2016.

== Recognition ==
On 5 January 1950, Salnikova was a recipient of the Medal "For Distinguished Labour"; the Medal "For Labour Valour" on 5 November 1954; and the Order of the Badge of Honour on 28 May 1966; and the Jubilee Medal "In Commemoration of the 100th Anniversary of the Birth of Vladimir Ilyich Lenin" in 1970. She was conferred the title of Hero of Socialist Labour, the Order of Lenin and the Hammer and Sickle gold medal by the Presidium of the Supreme Soviet of the Soviet Union on 15 January 1974. Salnikova was made an honorary citizen of the city of Berezniki in 1987.
