= Kongla Lekkla =

Thai futsal player

Personal information
- Full name: Kongla Lekkla
- Date of birth: 10 May 1986 (age 40)
- Place of birth: Khon Kaen, Thailand
- Height: 1.75 m (5 ft 9 in)
- Position: Winger

Team information
- Current team: Northeastern University

Senior career*
Years	Team	Apps	(Gls)
2016	Northeastern University		

International career
2009–	Thailand Futsal		
- * Club domestic league appearances and goals

Kongla Lekkla (Thai ก้องหล้า เหล็กกล้า), is a Thai futsal Defender, and a member of Thailand national futsal team. He plays for Northeastern University Futsal Club in Futsal Thailand League.
