= Weng Wei-pin =

Taiwanese footballer

Weng Wei-Pin
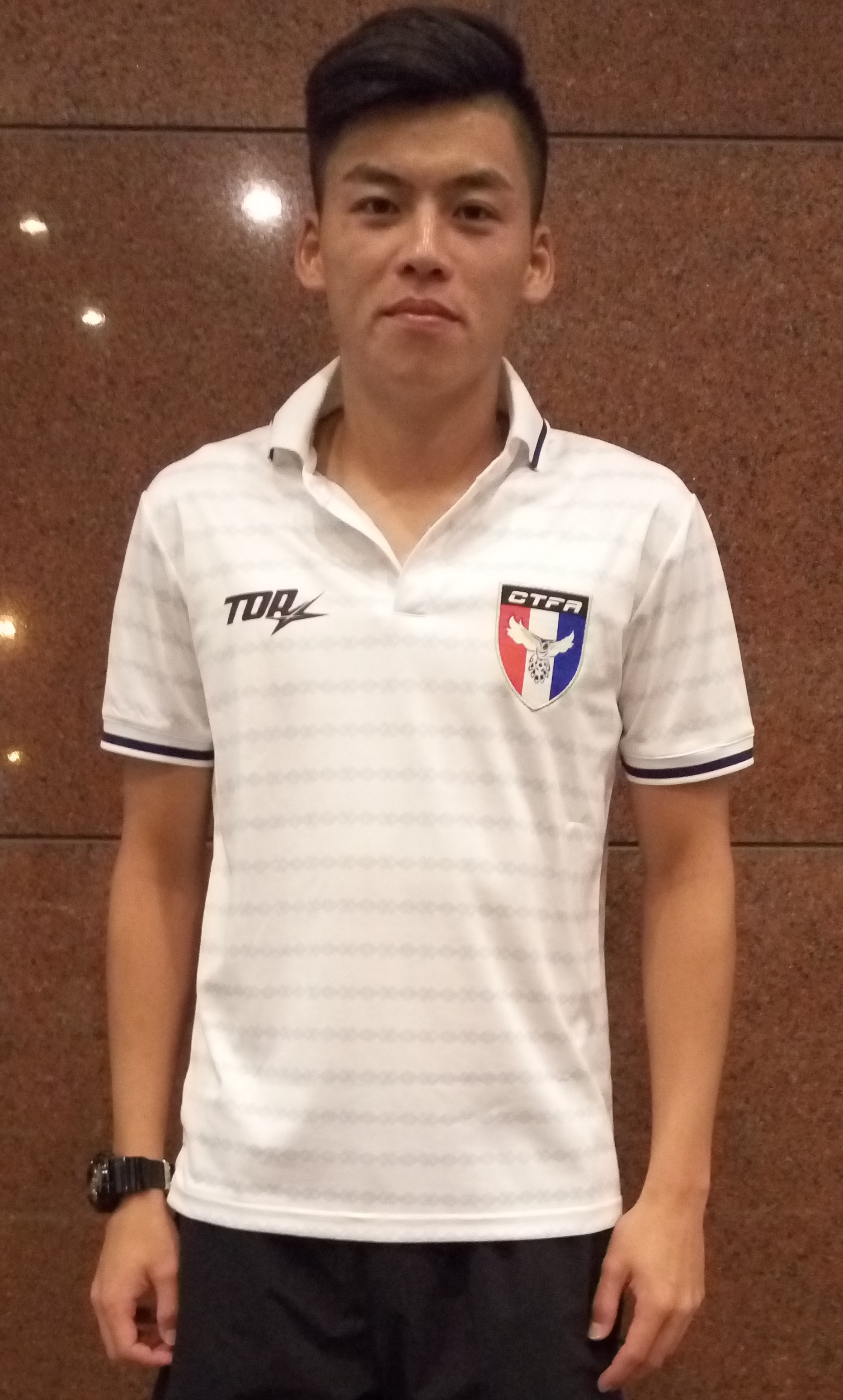
- Weng Wei-pin in 2016

Personal information
- Date of birth: November 23, 1991 (age 34)
- Place of birth: Taipei, Taiwan
- Height: 1.85 m (6 ft 1 in)
- Position: Defender

Team information
- Current team: Tatung F.C.
- Number: 29

Youth career
- 2010–2013: Fu Jen Catholic University

Senior career*
Years	Team	Apps	(Gls)
2014	I-Shou University		
2015–2016	NSTC FC		
2017–2021	Tatung F.C.		

International career
2014–	Chinese Taipei	5	(0)
- * Club domestic league appearances and goals

Weng Wei-pin (Chinese: 翁偉賓; born 23 November 1991) is a Taiwanese footballer who currently plays as a defender for the Chinese Taipei national football team.
