= Jargalyn Tsatsral =

Mongolian footballer

Personal information
- Full name: Jargalyn Tsatsral; Жаргалын Цацрал
- Date of birth: June 22, 1987 (age 39)
- Place of birth: Mongolia
- Position: Forward

Team information
- Current team: Khoromkhon

Senior career*
Years	Team	Apps	(Gls)
2011–	Khoromkhon		

International career
2011–	Mongolia	1	(0)
- * Club domestic league appearances and goals

Jargalyn Tsatsral (Mongolian: Жаргалын Цацрал; born 22 June 1987) is a Mongolian international footballer. He made his first appearance for the Mongolia national football team in 2011.
