= Hamid Reza Hosseini =

Afghan futsal player

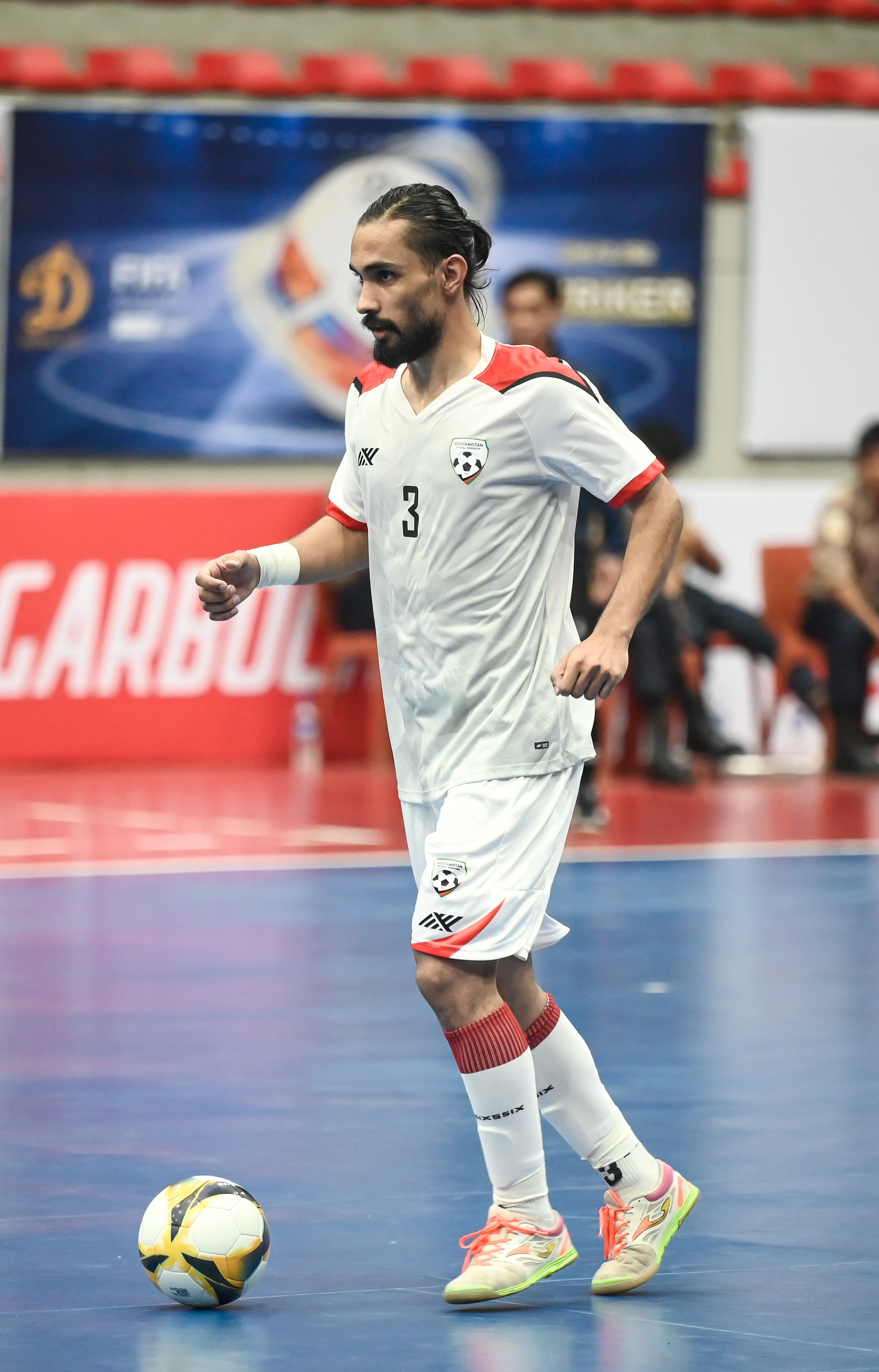
- Hamid Reza Hosseini With Afghanistan National Futsal Team in 2025

Personal information
- Full name: Hamid Reza Hosseini
- Date of birth: 30 September 2000 (age 26)
- Place of birth: Herat, Afghanistan
- Height: 1.75 m (5 ft 9 in)
- Position: Flank

Team information
- Current team: Foolad Hormozgan
- Number: 21

Youth career
- –: Mowoud Piradel Mashhad

Senior career*
| Years | Team | Apps | (Gls) |
| 2020 | Farsh Ara Mashhad | | |
| 2021 | Halus Indonesia | | |
| 2022 | Farsh Ara Mashhad | | |
| 2023 | Sadaqat Kabul | | |
| 2023–2024 | Farsh Ara Mashhad | | |
| 2024 | Al-Tai (Saudi Arabia) | | |
| 2024 | Saadat Nimroz | | |
| 2024-2025 | Farsh Ara Mashhad | | |
| 2025 | Noorzad Nimroz | | |
| 2025-2026 | Foolad Hormozgan | | |

International career
| 2018–2019 | Afghanistan U20 | | |
| 2022– | Afghanistan | | |
Medal record
| Silver medal – second place | 2019 AFC U-20 Championship (Tabriz) |
| Silver medal – second place | 2023 CAFA Championship (Tajikistan) |
- * Club domestic league appearances and goals

Hamid Reza Hosseini (born 30 September 2000) is an Afghan professional futsal player who plays as a flank and pivot for Foolad Hormozgan and the Afghanistan national futsal team. He began his youth career in Mashhad, Iran, before joining the Afghanistan U20 national team, where he became one of the squad's leading scorers.

He has competed in the top futsal leagues of Iran, Indonesia, Afghanistan, and Saudi Arabia. Hosseini later rejoined Farsh Ara in the Iranian Futsal Super League before transferring to Foolad Hormozgan in 2025.

He also took part in the 2024 Futsal World Cup with Afghanistan.

== Honours ==
=== Club ===
- Sadaqat Kabul
  - Afghan Futsal Premier League champion: 2023
- Saadat Nimroz
  - Afghan Futsal Premier League runner-up: 2024
- Noorzad Nimroz
  - Afghan Futsal Premier League third place: 2025

=== International ===
- Afghanistan U20 – Silver medal, AFC U-20 Championship (2019)
- Afghanistan – Silver medal, CAFA Championship (2023)
- Afghanistan – Participant, 2024 Futsal World Cup
