= Nonthaburi Sports Complex Gymnasium =

- ยิมเนเซียม อบจ.นนทบุรี (Thai)
- Interactive map of Nonthaburi Sports Complex Gymnasium
- Location: Nonthaburi, Thailand
- Coordinates: 13°51′08″N 100°26′24″E
- Owner: Nonthaburi Provincial Administrative Organization
- Capacity: 4,000 Seats

Construction
- Opened: 2024

Tenants
- 2025 SEA Games; 2026 ASEAN Futsal Championship; 2024 Continental Futsal Championship; 2025 Continental Futsal Championship; 2026 Continental Futsal Championship

The Nonthaburi Sports Complex Gymnasium, also known as the Wat Bot Don Phrom Gymnasium is an Indoor sports arena located in Bang Yai district, Nonthaburi, Thailand. It opened in 2024 and was used for the first time for international Futsal matches that year. It has hosted multiple International Futsal events, such as the 2025 Sea Games, the 2026 ASEAN Futsal Championship, as well as multiple editions of the Continental Futsal Championship, a yearly invitational futsal tournament run by the Sports Authority of Thailand. It is one of the home arenas of the Thailand National Futsal Team. It is located adjacent to the Nonthaburi Province Stadium.
