= Thailand national futsal team results and fixtures =

These are the Thailand national futsal team results, including FIFA Approved and unofficial friendly matches. Only FIFA Approval will be used in calculation of Futsal World Ranking.

== 2010 ==
Friendly Match

2 April 2010 Unofficial Friendly	Thailand	5 – 3	(Thailand) Port Futsal Club	Bangkok, Thailand
		Report		Stadium: Sport Authority; Attendance: N/A; Referee: N/A

2010 Thailand Five's (Friendly Tournament)

8 April 2010 2010 Thailand Five's	Thailand	1 – 4	Argentina	Udon Thani, Thailand
	Klomkliang 37'	Report	Aviglia Ignacio 3'; Esteban Arellano 22'; Mosenson Guido 26'; Pablo Belsito 39'	Stadium: CentralPlaza Udon Thani; Attendance: 2,500; Referee: Kaveepol Kamawitee (Thailand)

9 April 2010 2010 Thailand Five's	Thailand	3 – 4	Iran	Udon Thani, Thailand
	Thueanklang 4'; Khumthinkaew 6'; Santanaprasit 32'	Report	Taheri 4'; Daneshvar 13', 26'; Issarasuwipakorn 22' (o.g.)	Stadium: CentralPlaza Udon Thani; Attendance: 3,000; Referee: Prasert Krutsri (Thailand)

10 April 2010 2010 Thailand Five's	Thailand	3 – 1	Uzbekistan	Udon Thani, Thailand
		Report		Stadium: CentralPlaza Udon Thani; Attendance: N/A; Referee: N/A

Friendly Match

18 May 2010 Friendly	Thailand	8 – 1	Australia	Bangkok, Thailand
		Report		Stadium: Fashion Island Hall; Attendance: N/A; Referee: N/A

2010 AFC Futsal Championship

23 May 2010 2010 AFC Futsal Championship	Thailand	4 – 2	Kyrgyzstan	Tashkent, Thailand
12:30 UTC+5:00	Chalarmkhet 18'; Suratsawang 21'; Thueanklang 32'; Tabaldiev 38' (o.g.)	Report	Mendibaev 3'; Kondratkov 14'	Stadium: IT University Complex; Attendance: 500; Referee: Ryan Shepheard (Australia)

24 May 2010 2010 AFC Futsal Championship	South Korea	3 – 10	Thailand	Tashkent, Thailand
17:30 UTC+5:00	Jeong Eui-hyun 24'; Kim Jeong-nam 30', 37'	Report	Issarasuwipakorn 1', 1'; Thueanklang 4', 25'; Thusiri 6'; Wongkaeo 12'; Janta 16'; Chalarmkhet 30', 37', 39'	Stadium: IT University Complex; Attendance: 500; Referee: Rey Ritaga (Philippines)

25 May 2010 2010 AFC Futsal Championship	Thailand	5 – 2	Vietnam	Tashkent, Thailand
17:30 UTC+5:00	Thueanklang 3', 11'; Thusiri 15'; Trương Quốc Tuấn 29' (o.g.); Issarasuwipakorn 33'	Report	Nguyễn Quốc Bảo 9'; Trương Quốc Tuấn 35'	Stadium: IT University Complex; Attendance: 500; Referee: Vadim Baratov (Turkmenistan)

27 May 2010 2010 AFC Futsal Championship	Thailand	2 – 9	China	Tashkent, Thailand
11:00 UTC+5:00	Thueanklang 8'; Janta 28'	Report	Zhang Xi 2', 9', 31'; Wang Wei 9', 33'; Zhang Xiao 17'; Liang Shuang 30', 39'; Li Xin 31'	Stadium: IT University Complex; Attendance: 300; Referee: Alireza Sohrabi (Iran)

Friendly Match

8 December 2010 Friendly	Thailand	9 – 1	Vietnam	Bangkok, Thailand
		Report		Stadium: Vet I Gymnasium; Attendance: N/A; Referee: N/A

9 December 2010 Friendly	Thailand	7 – 0	Vietnam	Bangkok, Thailand
		Report		Stadium: Vet I Gymnasium; Attendance: N/A; Referee: N/A

11 December 2010 Friendly	Thailand	3 – 4	Japan	Bangkok, Thailand
		Report		Stadium: Vet I Gymnasium; Attendance: N/A; Referee: N/A

12 December 2010 Friendly	Thailand	2 – 0	Japan	Bangkok, Thailand
		Report		Stadium: Vet I Gymnasium; Attendance: N/A; Referee: N/A

== 2011 ==
Friendly Match

4 November 2011 Unofficial Friendly	Thailand	3 – 0	(Thailand) Port Futsal Club	Bangkok, Thailand
		Report		Stadium: Grand Sport Hall; Attendance: N/A; Referee: N/A

8 November 2011 Unofficial Friendly	Thailand	10 – 3	(Thailand) Phuket United Futsal Club	Phuket, Thailand
		Report		Stadium: Grand Sport Hall; Attendance: N/A; Referee: N/A

2011 Southeast Asian Games

17 November 2011 2011 Southeast Asian Games	Thailand	17 – 0	Myanmar	Jakarta, Indonesia
18:00 UTC+7:00	Suphawut 1', 24', 35'; Than Wunna Aung 14' (o.g.); Lertchai 16', 25'; Aung Thu 17' (o.g.); Nattaphon 18', 19'; Apiwat 19', 27', 31'; Kritsada 25'; Jetsada 26', 28', 38'; Nattavut 39'	Report		Stadium: Gor Popki; Attendance: N/A; Referee: N/A

18 November 2011 2011 Southeast Asian Games	Malaysia	2 – 9	Thailand	Jakarta, Indonesia
18:00 UTC+7:00	Ali 5', 39'	Report	Lerchai 11'; Jetsada 17', 27'; Suphawut 19', 25', 26'; Sermphan 31'; Kritsada 34'; Apiwat 39'	Stadium: Gor Popki; Attendance: N/A; Referee: N/A

21 November 2011 2011 Southeast Asian Games	Thailand	7 – 4	Indonesia	Jakarta, Indonesia
18:15 UTC+7:00	Hairul 1' (o.g.); Panomkorn 8'; Sermphan 18'; Nattavut 20'; Jetsada 23', 24'; Panuwat 27'	Report	Afif 19'; Panuwat 30' (o.g.); Jaelani 34'; Hairul 39'	Stadium: Gor Popki; Attendance: N/A; Referee: N/A

22 November 2011 2011 Southeast Asian Games	Vietnam	3 – 8	Thailand	Jakarta, Indonesia
16:00 UTC+7:00	Nguyen Thien Trong 31'; Phung Trong Luan 32'; Tran Hoang Vinh 35'	Report	Suphawut 2', 30'; Kritsada 11', 34', 39'; Sermphan 11'; Lertchai 28'; Jirawat 39'	Stadium: Gor Popki; Attendance: N/A; Referee: N/A

== 2012 ==
Friendly Match

12 January 2012 Unofficial Friendly	Thailand	10 – 3	(Thailand) Rajnavy Futsal Club	Bangkok, Thailand
		Report		Attendance: N/A; Referee: N/A

19 January 2012 Unofficial Friendly	Thailand	9 – 3	(Thailand) Port Futsal Club	Bangkok, Thailand
		Report		Attendance: N/A; Referee: N/A

14 February 2012 Unofficial Friendly	Thailand	13 – 1	(Thailand) Plutaluang School	Chonburi, Thailand
		Report		Attendance: N/A; Referee: N/A

15 February 2012 Unofficial Friendly	Thailand	6 – 2	(Thailand) Pattaya City	Chonburi, Thailand
		Report		Attendance: N/A; Referee: N/A

18 February 2012 Unofficial Friendly	Thailand	7 – 1	(Thailand) Bangkokthonburi University	Bangkok, Thailand
		Report		Stadium: Chanchai Acadium; Attendance: N/A; Referee: N/A

2012 AFC Futsal Championship qualification : ASEAN

21 February 2012 2012 AFCQ : ASEAN	Thailand	13 – 0	Myanmar	Bangkok, Thailand
19:00 UTC+7:00	Chalaemkhet 3', 29'; Madyalan 8', 33'; Thueanklang 9', 25', 30', 36'; Wongkaeo 9', 17', 26'; Sornwichian 17', 37'	Report		Stadium: Krungthep Thonburi Indoor Stadium; Attendance: 1,200; Referee: Abdulrahman Abdulqader (Bahrain)

22 February 2012 2012 AFCQ : ASEAN	Philippines	2 – 17	Thailand	Bangkok, Thailand
19:00 UTC+7:00	Mallari 5'; Zerrudo 27'	Report	Madyalan 7', 16'; Chudech 9', 16', 36'; Wongkaeo 11', 19', 28', 28', 29', 29'; Thueanklang 13', 14', 26'; Chaemcharoen 15', 31'; Ratana 33'	Stadium: Krungthep Thonburi Indoor Stadium; Attendance: 1,200; Referee: Husein Khalaileh (Jordan)

23 February 2012 2012 AFCQ : ASEAN	Thailand	5 – 2	Indonesia	Bangkok, Thailand
17:00 UTC+7:00	Penpakul 4'; Thueanklang 11'; Chudech 19', 31'; Sornwichian 36'	Report	Tamimy 2'; Silitonga 33'	Stadium: Krungthep Thonburi Indoor Stadium; Attendance: 1,000; Referee: Vadim Baratov (Turkmenistan)

25 February 2012 2012 AFCQ : ASEAN	Thailand	7 – 0	Australia	Bangkok, Thailand
14:00 UTC+7:00	Thueanklang 4', 37', 40'; Chalaemkhet 9'; Madyalan 20'; Chaemcharoen 27'; Wongkaeo 40'	Report		Stadium: Krungthep Thonburi Indoor Stadium; Attendance: 3,000; Referee: Nurdin Bukuev (Kyrgyzstan)

26 February 2012 2012 AFCQ : ASEAN	Thailand	3 – 1	Indonesia	Bangkok, Thailand
17:00 UTC+7:00	Thueanklang 6'; Chomboon 32'; Wongkaeo 39'	Report	Wardhana 22'	Stadium: Krungthep Thonburi Indoor Stadium; Attendance: 3,000; Referee: Vadim Baratov (Turkmenistan)

Friendly Match

14 April 2012 Friendly	Thailand	0 – 1	Turkmenistan	Bangkok, Thailand
		Report		Stadium: RBAC Gymnasium; Attendance: N/A; Referee: N/A

2012 AFF Futsal Championship

20 May 2012 2012 AFF Futsal Championship	Brunei	0 – 22	Thailand	Bangkok, Thailand
17:00 UTC+7:00		Report	Thueanklang 1', 2', 6', 20', 25'; Wongkaeo 3', 12', 22', 35', 36'; Chudech 6', 7'; Sornwichian 12', 18', 26'; Ahamah 17', 34', 40'; Ulfi 23' (o.g.); Penpakul 26'; Madlayalan 33'; Chaemcharoen 38'	Stadium: Chanchai Acadium; Attendance: N/A; Referee: N/A

21 May 2012 2012 AFF Futsal Championship	Thailand	26 – 2	Laos	Bangkok, Thailand
14:00 UTC+7:00	Thueanklang 1' (?); Wongkaeo (?); Sornwichian (?); Chaemcharoen (?); Ahamah (?); Chudech (?); Penpakul (?); Luksanato (?)	Report	Chanthavong 26'; Inthavong 38'	Stadium: Chanchai Acadium; Attendance: N/A; Referee: N/A

22 May 2012 2012 AFF Futsal Championship	Timor-Leste	1 – 19	Thailand	Bangkok, Thailand
14:00 UTC+7:00		Report	Chudech (?); Wongkaeo (?); Madyalan (?) (?) (?) (?) (?) (?) (?) (?) (?) (?)	Stadium: Chanchai Acadium; Attendance: N/A; Referee: N/A

23 May 2012 2012 AFF Futsal Championship	Indonesia	1 – 6	Thailand	Bangkok, Thailand
19:00 UTC+7:00	Andri 23'	Report	Kritsada 2'; Apiwat 6'; Suphawut 10', 34'; Jetsada 25'; Piyapan 33'	Stadium: Chanchai Acadium; Attendance: N/A; Referee: N/A

25 May 2012 2012 AFF Futsal Championship	Thailand	12 – 1	Malaysia	Bangkok, Thailand
17:00 UTC+7:00	Suphawut 1', 13', 20', 26', 28'; Jirawat 5'; Nattawut 9', 28'; Jetsada 15', 17'; Kritsada 19', 26'	Report	Qaiser 35'	Stadium: Chanchai Acadium; Attendance: N/A; Referee: N/A

27 May 2012 2012 AFF Futsal Championship	Vietnam	4 – 9	Thailand	Bangkok, Thailand
17:00 UTC+7:00	Luu Quynh Toan 19' (pen.); Tran Van Vu 29'; Nguyen Trong Thien 36'; Tran Hoang Vinh 37'	Report	Suphawut 2', 5', 20' (pen.); Apiwat 25'; Jetsada 28'; Kritsada 31', 31' (?) (?)	Stadium: Chanchai Acadium; Attendance: N/A; Referee: Heldy Idang (Malaysia)

Friendly Match

18 May 2012 Friendly	Thailand	4 – 3	Australia	Suphanburi, Thailand
		Report		Stadium: Silpa-Archa Gymnasium; Attendance: N/A; Referee: N/A

20 May 2012 Friendly	Thailand	4 – 2	Australia	Bangkok, Thailand
		Report		Attendance: N/A; Referee: N/A

2012 AFC Futsal Championship

25 May 2012 2012 AFC Futsal Championship	Thailand	2 – 0	Kyrgyzstan	Dubai, United Arab Emirates
20:30 UTC+4:00	Chaemcharoen 33'; Ahamah 39'	Report		Stadium: Al-Wasl Stadium; Attendance: 150; Referee: Kim Jang-kwan (South Korea)

26 May 2012 2012 AFC Futsal Championship	Turkmenistan	1 – 5	Thailand	Dubai, United Arab Emirates
17:30 UTC+4:00	V. Atayev 4'	Report	Thueanklang 3', 9'; Chaemcharoen 6'; Lakka 36'; Wongkaeo 39'	Stadium: Al-Wasl Stadium; Attendance: 160; Referee: Scott Kidson (Australia)

27 May 2012 2012 AFC Futsal Championship	United Arab Emirates	2 – 4	Thailand	Dubai, United Arab Emirates
20:00 UTC+4:00	Jamil 1', 40'	Report	Chaemcharoen 5'; Sornwichian 10'; Wongkaeo 17'; Thueanklang 38'	Stadium: Al-Wasl Stadium; Attendance: 250; Referee: Husein Khalaileh (Jordan)

29 May 2012 2012 AFC Futsal Championship	Thailand	5 – 3	Lebanon	Dubai, United Arab Emirates
15:30 UTC+4:00	Chudech 5'; Thueanklang 8'; Chaemcharoen 20'; Madyalan 30'; Sornwichian 36'	Report	Kawsan 1', 4'; El Homsi 38'	Stadium: Al-Wasl Stadium; Attendance: 350; Referee: Scott Kidson (Australia)

30 May 2012 2012 AFC Futsal Championship	Thailand	5 – 4 (a.e.t.)	Iran	Dubai, United Arab Emirates
15:30 UTC+4:00	Thueanklang 10', 30' (pen.), 50'; Sornwichian 32'; Chaemcharoen 43'	Report	Shamsaei 4', 49'; Tayyebi 7'; Asghari 30'	Stadium: Al-Wasl Stadium; Attendance: 800; Referee: Timo Onatsu (Finland)

1 June 2012 2012 AFC Futsal Championship	Thailand	1 – 6	Japan	Dubai, United Arab Emirates
19:30 UTC+4:00	Wongkaeo 11'	Report	Kogure 4'; Kitahara 15'; Inaba 31'; Henmi 34'; Kawahara 37'; Murakami 38'	Stadium: Al-Wasl Stadium; Attendance: 926; Referee: Nurdin Bukuev (Kyrgyzstan)

Friendly Match

24 August 2012 Friendly	Thailand	0 – 8	Spain	Bangkok, Thailand
18:00 UTC+7:00		Report		Stadium: Nimibutr Indoor; Attendance: N/A; Referee: N/A

26 August 2012 Friendly	Thailand	4 – 6	Spain	Nakhon Ratchasima, Thailand
17:00 UTC+7:00		Report		Stadium: Chatchai Hall; Attendance: N/A; Referee: N/A

21 October 2012 Friendly	Thailand	4 – 3	Egypt	Bangkok, Thailand
18:00 UTC+7:00		Report		Stadium: Vet II Sport Venue; Attendance: N/A; Referee: N/A

22 October 2012 Friendly	Thailand	4 – 5	Australia	Bangkok, Thailand
		Report		Stadium: Vet II Sport Venue; Attendance: N/A; Referee: N/A

24 October 2012 Friendly	Thailand	3 – 4	Solomon Islands	Bangkok, Thailand
		Report		Stadium: Vet II Sport Venue; Attendance: N/A; Referee: N/A

25 October 2012 Friendly	Thailand	5 – 7	Panama	Bangkok, Thailand
18:00 UTC+7:00		Report		Stadium: Vet II Sport Venue; Attendance: N/A; Referee: N/A

27 October 2012 Unofficial Friendly	Thailand	5 – 0	(Thailand) Port Futsal Club	Bangkok, Thailand
		Report		Stadium: Vet I Sport Venue; Attendance: N/A; Referee: N/A

2012 FIFA Futsal World Cup

1 November 2012 2012 FIFA Futsal World Cup	Thailand	3 – 1	Costa Rica	Bangkok, Thailand
19:00 UTC+7:00	Kiatiyot 18'; Suphawut 29'; Jirawat 38'	Report	Zúñiga 37'	Stadium: Hua Mark Indoor; Attendance: 4,379; Referee: Héctor Rojas (Peru)

4 November 2012 2012 FIFA Futsal World Cup	Thailand	3 – 5	Ukraine	Bangkok, Thailand
19:00 UTC+7:00	Kritsada 24'; Suphawut 35'; Jirawat 39'	Report	Ovsiannikov 4'; Chepornyuk 7'; Rogachov 13', 20'; Pavlenko 20'	Stadium: Hua Mark Indoor; Attendance: 5,613; Referee: Daniel Rodriguez (Uruguay)

7 November 2012 2012 FIFA Futsal World Cup	Paraguay	3 – 2	Thailand	Bangkok, Thailand
19:00 UTC+7:00	A. Salas 4'; Ayala 7'; J. Salas 10'	Report	Suphawut 11'; Jetsada 25'	Stadium: Hua Mark Indoor; Attendance: 5,307; Referee: Ivan Shabanov (Russia)

11 November 2012 2012 FIFA Futsal World Cup	Spain	7 – 1	Thailand	Bangkok, Thailand
18:30 UTC+7:00	Torras 10', 17'; Fernandão 25', 28'; Aicardo 30'; Ortiz 34'; Álvaro 38'	Report	Kritsada 39'	Stadium: Nimibutr Indoor; Attendance: 4,170; Referee: Alexander Cline (Panama)

== 2013 ==
Friendly Match

7 January 2013 Friendly	Thailand	3 – 7	Italy	Trang, Thailand
16:45 UTC+7:00		Report		Stadium: Trang City municipality Hall; Attendance: N/A

29 May 2013 Friendly	Thailand	1 – 4	Romania	Bangkok, Thailand
17:00 UTC+7:00		Report		Stadium: Fashion Island Hall; Attendance: N/A

30 May 2013 Friendly	Thailand	9 – 4	Romania	Bangkok, Thailand
17:00 UTC+7:00		Report		Stadium: Chanchai Acadium; Attendance: N/A

1 June 2013 Friendly	Thailand	7 – 3	Romania	Bangkok, Thailand
17:00 UTC+7:00		Report		Stadium: Chanchai Acadium; Attendance: N/A

11 June 2013 Friendly	Thailand	8 – 3	Myanmar	Bangkok, Thailand
17:00 UTC+7:00		Report		Stadium: 72nd Anniversary Stadium Hall; Attendance: N/A

19 June 2013 Friendly	Thailand	8 – 2	United Arab Emirates	Bangkok, Thailand
17:00 UTC+7:00		Report		Stadium: Grand Soccer Pro Arena; Attendance: N/A

2013 Asian Indoor and Martial Arts Games

26 June 2013 2013 Asian Indoor and Martial Arts Games	Thailand	29 – 1	Bhutan	Incheon, South Korea
16:00 UTC+9:00	Wongkaeo 1', 2', 8', 9', 21'; Thueanklang 3', 3', 12', 24', 29', 37'; Jamgrajang 6'; Chudech 6', 27'; Madyalan 7', 13', 32', 40'; Chaemcharoen 14', 28', 34'; Rattanawongswas 17', 24', 25', 40'; Lakka 20', 30'; Sornwichian 21'; Nusaya 29'	Report	D. Dhendup 1'	Stadium: Dongbu Students Gymnasium; Attendance: N/A; Referee: Nurdin Bukuev (Kyrgyzstan)

30 June 2013 2013 Asian Indoor and Martial Arts Games	Thailand	4 – 1	Malaysia	Incheon, South Korea
16:00 UTC+9:00	Wongkaeo 10', 31', 35'; Chudech 28'	Report	Hadzir 3'	Stadium: Songdo Global University Gymnasium; Attendance: N/A; Referee: Mohamad Chami (Lebanon)

3 July 2013 2013 Asian Indoor and Martial Arts Games	Thailand	7 – 3	Lebanon	Incheon, South Korea
16:00 UTC+9:00	Sornwichian 3', 33'; Wongkaeo 4'; Thueanklang 16'; Lakka 19'; Chudech 32'; Madyalan 35'	Report	Takaji 15'; Tneich 19', 37'	Stadium: Songdo Global University Gymnasium; Attendance: N/A; Referee: Nurdin Bukuev (Kyrgyzstan)

4 July 2013 2013 Asian Indoor and Martial Arts Games	Thailand	4 – 5	Iran	Incheon, South Korea
16:00 UTC+9:00	Sornwichian 3'; Chaemcharoen 29'; Thueanklang 29'; Wongkaeo 40' (pen.)	Report	Tayyebi 5', 7', 25'; Khayyam 20'; Bahadori 34'	Stadium: Songdo Global University Gymnasium; Attendance: N/A; Referee: Scott Kidson (Australia)

6 July 2013 2013 Asian Indoor and Martial Arts Games	Thailand	9 – 6	Kuwait	Incheon, South Korea
10:30 UTC+9:00	Chaemcharoen 6', 8', 16', 30'; Thueanklang 22'; Wongkaeo 25', 33'; Rattana 28', 40'	Report	Al-Taweel 5'; Al-Mosabehi 11'; Al-Mutairi 11', 32'; Al-Wadi 36'; Al-Farsi 38'	Stadium: Songdo Global University Gymnasium; Attendance: N/A; Referee: Yasukazu Nobumoto (Japan)

Friendly Match

25 September 2013 Unofficial Friendly	Thailand	3 – 2	(Thailand) Port Futsal Club	Bangkok, Thailand
		Report		Stadium: Phut Anan Arena; Attendance: N/A; Referee: N/A

Pre-Southeast Asian Games (Friendly Tournament)

29 September 2013 Pre-SEA Games	Myanmar B	1 – 3	Thailand	Naypyidaw, Myanmar
		Report		Stadium: Wunna Theikdi Futsal; Attendance: N/A; Referee: N/A

30 September 2013 Pre-SEA Games	Myanmar A	0 – 4	Thailand	Naypyidaw, Myanmar
		Report		Stadium: Wunna Theikdi Futsal; Attendance: N/A; Referee: N/A

1 October 2013 Pre-SEA Games	Malaysia	0 – 1	Thailand	Naypyidaw, Myanmar
		Report		Stadium: Wunna Theikdi Futsal; Attendance: N/A; Referee: N/A

3 October 2013 Pre-SEA Games	Thailand	4 – 3	Malaysia	Naypyidaw, Myanmar
				Stadium: Wunna Theikdi Futsal; Attendance: N/A; Referee: N/A

11 October 2013 Unofficial Friendly	Thailand	2 – 0	(Thailand) CAT Telecom Futsal Club	Bangkok, Thailand
		Report		Stadium: Dhurakij Pundit University Gymnasium; Attendance: N/A; Referee: N/A

15 October 2013 Friendly	Thailand	10 – 1	Laos	Bangkok, Thailand
		Report		Stadium: Chanchai Acadium; Attendance: N/A; Referee: N/A

2013 AFF Futsal Championship

20 October 2013 2013 AFF Futsal Championship	Thailand	20 – 1	Philippines	Bangkok, Thailand
14:00 UTC+7:00	Suphawut 3', 12', 22', 25', 33', 33'; Jirawat 4', 11', 30', 34'; Konghla 5', 24'; Atirach 9'; Nawin 16'; Kritsada 21', 23', 29', 30', 31', 33'	Report	Simpson 35'	Stadium: Chanchai Acadium; Attendance: N/A; Referee: N/A

21 October 2013 2013 AFF Futsal Championship	Thailand	8 – 1	Brunei	Bangkok, Thailand
16:00 UTC+7:00	Konghla 1'; Jetsada 7'; Kritsada 9', 30'; Suphawut 10'; Nawin 18'; Patchaya 18'; Jirawat 31'	Report	Muhammad Naqib 1'	Stadium: Chanchai Acadium; Attendance: N/A; Referee: N/A

22 October 2013 2013 AFF Futsal Championship	Malaysia	0 – 2	Thailand	Bangkok, Thailand
19:00 UTC+7:00		Report	Jetsada; Kritsada	Stadium: Chanchai Acadium; Attendance: N/A; Referee: Sopheak Saing (Cambodia)

23 October 2013 2013 AFF Futsal Championship	Thailand	6 – 2	Vietnam	Bangkok, Thailand
19:00 UTC+7:00	Kritsada 9', 24', 28'; Jirawat 11', 28'; Chaiwat 40'	Report	Bao Quan 14'; Van Vu 17'	Stadium: Chanchai Acadium; Attendance: N/A; Referee: Sopheak Saing (Cambodia)

25 October 2013 2013 AFF Futsal Championship	Thailand	10 – 4	Indonesia	Bangkok, Thailand
13:30 UTC+7:00	Jetsada 6'; Nawin 11'; Suphawut 13', 34', 36', 39', 39'; Jirawat 15', 38'; Kritsada 28'	Report	Permana 12'; Rattana 26' (o.g.); Andriansyah 33'; Saptaji 35'	Stadium: Chanchai Acadium; Attendance: N/A; Referee: N/A

27 October 2013 2013 AFF Futsal Championship	Thailand	2 – 1	Australia	Bangkok, Thailand
15:00 UTC+7:00	Suphawut 13', 36'	Report	Basger 40'	Stadium: Chanchai Acadium; Attendance: N/A; Referee: N/A

Friendly Match

8 November 2013 Unofficial Friendly	Thailand	4 – 2	(Thailand) Rajnavy Futsal Club	Bangkok, Thailand
		Report		Attendance: N/A; Referee: N/A

15 November 2013 Unofficial Friendly	Thailand	4 – 0	(Thailand) Rajnavy Futsal Club	Bangkok, Thailand
		Report		Attendance: N/A; Referee: N/A

2013 Ho Chi Minh City International Futsal (Friendly Tournament)

19 November 2013 2013 HCMC International	Japan	3 – 0	Thailand	Ho Chi Minh City, Vietnam
		Report		Stadium: Phú Thọ Indoor Stadium; Attendance: N/A; Referee: N/A

20 November 2013 2013 HCMC International	Brazil	5 – 1	Thailand	Ho Chi Minh City, Vietnam
		Report		Stadium: Phú Thọ Indoor Stadium; Attendance: N/A; Referee: N/A

21 November 2013 2013 HCMC International	Vietnam	1 – 3	Thailand	Ho Chi Minh City, Vietnam
		Report		Stadium: Phú Thọ Indoor Stadium; Attendance: N/A; Referee: N/A

2013 Southeast Asian Games

13 December 2013 2013 Southeast Asian Games	Thailand	12 – 3	Laos	Naypyidaw, Myanmar
15:30 UTC+6:30		Report		Stadium: Wunna Theikdi Futsal; Attendance: N/A; Referee: REY RITAGA (Philippines)

15 December 2013 2013 Southeast Asian Games	Vietnam	0 – 4	Thailand	Naypyidaw, Myanmar
15:30 UTC+6:30		Report		Stadium: Wunna Theikdi Futsal; Attendance: N/A; Referee: REY RITAGA (Philippines)

17 December 2013 2013 Southeast Asian Games	Thailand	8 – 1	Myanmar	Naypyidaw, Myanmar
17:00 UTC+6:30		Report		Stadium: Wunna Theikdi Futsal; Attendance: N/A; Referee: BARLAS PORFERIO JR (Philippines)

20 December 2013 2013 Southeast Asian Games	Vietnam	1 – 8	Thailand	Naypyidaw, Myanmar
16:00 UTC+6:30		Report		Stadium: Wunna Theikdi Futsal; Attendance: N/A; Referee: REY RITAGA (Philippines)

== 2014 ==
Friendly Match

18 April 2014 Unofficial Friendly	Thailand	5 – 0	(Thailand) Chiangmai Futsal Club	Chiangmai, Thailand
		Report		Attendance: N/A; Referee: N/A

22 April 2014 Friendly	Thailand	4 – 2	Australia	Bangkok, Thailand
		Report		Stadium: Chanchai Acadium; Attendance: N/A; Referee: N/A

24 April 2014 Friendly	Thailand	1 – 2	Indonesia	Bangkok, Thailand
17:00 UTC+7:00		Report		Stadium: Chanchai Acadium; Attendance: N/A; Referee: N/A

2014 AFC Futsal Championship

1 May 2014 2014 AFC Futsal Championship	Thailand	7 – 1	Malaysia	Ho Chi Minh City, Vietnam
16:00 UTC+7:00	Jirawat Sornwichian 11', 12'; Suphawut Thueanklang 26', 29', 36'; Wiwat Thaijaroen 31'; Zubaidi Alwee 39' (o.g.)	Report	Asmie Amir 11'	Stadium: Phu Tho Gymnasium; Attendance: 350; Referee: Vahid Arzpeyma Mohamareh (Iran)

3 May 2014 2014 AFC Futsal Championship	Chinese Taipei	2 – 5	Thailand	Ho Chi Minh City, Vietnam
18:30 UTC+7:00	Lo Chih-an 24'; Huang Cheng-Tsung 33'	Report	Suphawut Thueanklang 3'; Jetsada Chudech 4'; Piyapat Rattana 8'; Kritsada Wongkaeo 24'; Jirawat Sornwichian 33'	Stadium: Phu Tho Gymnasium; Attendance: 200; Referee: Hasan Mohammed Mousa Al-Gbur (Iraq)

5 May 2014 2014 AFC Futsal Championship	Thailand	3 – 3	Lebanon	Ho Chi Minh City, Vietnam
16:00 UTC+7:00	Kritsada Wongkaeo 21'; Suphawut Thueanklang 33', 40'	Report	Ali Tneich 1'; Karim Abou Zaid 17', 40'	Stadium: Phu Tho Gymnasium; Attendance: 200; Referee: Zhang You Ze (China)

7 May 2014 2014 AFC Futsal Championship	Thailand	2 – 3	Japan	Ho Chi Minh City, Vietnam
15:30 UTC+7:00	Suphawut Thueanklang 20'; Jirawat Sornwichian 25'	Report	Kazuhiro Nibuya 7'; Nobuya Osodo 14'; Kaoru Morioka 36'	Stadium: Ton Duc Thang University Gymnasium; Attendance: 1,000; Referee: Mohamad Chami (Lebanon)

Friendly Match

20 August 2014 Unofficial Friendly	Thailand	0 – 2	(Iran) Dabiri Tabriz FSC	Bangkok, Thailand
		Report		Stadium: Sport Authority; Attendance: N/A; Referee: N/A

21 August 2014 Unofficial Friendly	Thailand	1 – 3	(Kuwait) Qadsia SC	Bangkok, Thailand
		Report		Stadium: 72nd Anniversary Stadium Hall. Attendance: N/A; Referee: N/A

28 August 2014 Unofficial Friendly	ZVK Hasselt (Belgium)	2 – 3	Thailand	Belgium
				Attendance: N/A; Referee: N/A

29 August 2014 Unofficial Friendly	Krijnen Malle (Belgium)	4 – 4	Thailand	Belgium
				Attendance: N/A; Referee: N/A

31 August 2014 Unofficial Friendly	Groene Ster Vlissingen (Netherlands)	1 – 2	Thailand	Rotterdam, Netherlands
				Attendance: N/A; Referee: N/A

2 September 2014 Unofficial Friendly	CF Eindhoven (Netherlands)	3 – 3	Thailand	Maastricht, Netherlands
				Attendance: N/A; Referee: N/A

2014 AFF Futsal Championship

20 September 2014 2014 AFF Futsal Championship	Philippines	1 – 16	Thailand	Shah Alam, Malaysia
12:00 UTC+8:00	Zandi 10'	Report	Piyapan 2'; Atirat 2', 11'; Wanlop 8', 24', 26'; Jetsada 10', 19', 29', 39', 40'; Sorasak 20', 34'; Konghla 30'; Kawin 38'; Piyanat 39'	Stadium: Stadium Melawati; Attendance: 1,000; Referee: Hj. Dasnan Hj. Abdul Rahman (Brunei)

21 September 2014 2014 AFF Futsal Championship	Thailand	11 – 1	Laos	Shah Alam, Malaysia
09:30 UTC+8:00	Atirat 3', 19'; Wanlop 9'; Jetsada 10', 19'; Wiwat 14', 23', 30'; Konghla 19', 22'; Kittipong 29'	Report	Inhtavong 30'	Stadium: Stadium Melawati; Attendance: N/A; Referee: Zulkifli Ahmad (Malaysia)

22 September 2014 2014 AFF Futsal Championship	Myanmar	4 – 5	Thailand	Shah Alam, Malaysia
14:30 UTC+8:00	Pyae Phyo Maung (3) 31'; Aung Aung 32'; Kanison 37' (o.g.); Nyein Min Soe 40'	Report	Piyapan 3'; Kittipong 9'; Atirat 13'; Jetsada 32', 38'	Stadium: Stadium Melawati; Attendance: N/A; Referee: Haji Dasnan Haji Abdullah (Brunei)

23 September 2014 2014 AFF Futsal Championship	Vietnam	2 – 0	Thailand	Shah Alam, Malaysia
14:30 UTC+8:00	Nam 31'; Luan 35'	Report		Stadium: Stadium Melawati; Attendance: N/A; Referee: Zulkifli Ahmad (Malaysia)

25 September 2014 2014 AFF Futsal Championship	Indonesia	0 – 1	Thailand	Shah Alam, Malaysia
14:00 UTC+8:00		Report	Wanlop 40'	Stadium: Stadium Melawati; Attendance: N/A; Referee: Helday Idang (Malaysia)

27 September 2014 2014 AFF Futsal Championship	Thailand	6 – 0	Australia	Shah Alam, Malaysia
17:00 UTC+8:00	Piyapan 6', 24'; Jetsada 7'; Wanlop 29'; Konghla 34'; Sorasak 40'	Report		Stadium: Stadium Melawati; Attendance: N/A; Referee: N/A

2014 CFA International (Friendly Tournament)

5 December 2014 2014 CFA International	Myanmar	5 – 7	Thailand	Changshu, China
14:00 UTC+8:00		Report		Stadium: Changshu Sports Center Gymnasium; Attendance: N/A; Referee: N/A

6 December 2014 2014 CFA International	China	3 – 3	Thailand	Changshu, China
16:00 UTC+8:00		Report		Stadium: Changshu Sports Center Gymnasium; Attendance: N/A; Referee: N/A

7 December 2014 2014 CFA International	Thailand	7 – 0	Mexico	Changshu, China
16:00 UTC+8:00		Report		Stadium: Changshu Sports Center Gymnasium; Attendance: N/A; Referee: N/A

== 2015 ==
Friendly Match

24 July 2015 Unofficial Friendly	Thailand	4 – 3	(Thailand) Rajnavy Futsal Club	Bangkok, Thailand
		Report		Stadium: Phut Anan Areana; Attendance: N/A; Referee: N/A

27 July 2015 Unofficial Friendly	Thailand	6 – 4	Thailand U-21	Bangkok, Thailand
		Report		Stadium: Sports Authority of Thailand; Attendance: N/A; Referee: N/A

28 July 2015 Unofficial Friendly	Thailand	1 – 1	(Thailand) Samut Sakhon Futsal Club	Samut Sakhon, Thailand
		Report		Stadium: Samutsakhon Wuttichai School; Attendance: N/A; Referee: N/A

30 July 2015 Unofficial Friendly	Thailand	4 – 3	(Indonesia) FC Pingdus	Bangkok, Thailand
		Report		Stadium: 72nd Anniversary Stadium Hall; Attendance: N/A; Referee: N/A

31 July 2015 Unofficial Friendly	Thailand	3 – 1	(Thailand) Nakhonratchasima V-One	Nakhon Ratchasima, Thailand
		Report		Stadium: Chatchai Hall; Attendance: N/A; Referee: N/A

24 September 2015 Friendly	Thailand	4 – 3	Qatar	Bangkok, Thailand
	Jetsada 11'; Sorasak 18', 36'; Al-Shawani (og.) 21'	Report	Lucas Oliveira 22'; Rodrigo 31'; Al-Bardi 31'	Stadium: Phut Anan Arena; Attendance: N/A; Referee: N/A

25 September 2015 Unofficial Friendly	Thailand	2 – 2	(Thailand) Bangkok Futsal Club	Bangkok, Thailand
	Nattawut 7'; Suphawut 30'	Report	Navin 33'; Renato Milanda 34'	Stadium: Bangkok Arena; Attendance: N/A; Referee: N/A

26 September 2015 Friendly	Thailand	7 – 0	Bahrain	Samut Sakhon, Thailand
	Suphawut 5', 8'; Sorasak 7', 36'; Piyanat 10'; Wanlop 32'; Jirawat 32'; Jetsada 38'	Report	Lucas Oliveira 22'; Rodrigo 31'; Al-Bardi 31'	Stadium: Samutsakhon Wuttichai School; Attendance: N/A; Referee: N/A

2 October 2015 Friendly	Thailand	6 – 1	Myanmar	Bangkok, Thailand
	Piyanat 4'; Thanapon 7'; Jetsada 11'; Wanlop 13', 14'; Chaiyawat 31'	Report	Sai Pyo Aung 5'	Stadium: 72nd Anniversary Stadium Hall; Attendance: N/A; Referee: N/A

2015 AFF Futsal Championship

9 October 2015 2015 AFF Futsal Championship	Singapore	0 – 8	Thailand	Bangkok, Thailand
19:00 UTC+7:00		(AFF)	Jetsada 1', 26'; Suphawut 5'; Kritsada 8', 19', 35'; Piyapan 34'; Nattawut 38'	Stadium: Bangkok Arena; Attendance: 6,000; Referee: Hawkar Salar Ahmed (Iraq)

10 October 2015 2015 AFF Futsal Championship	Thailand	6 – 1	Malaysia	Bangkok, Thailand
19:00 UTC+7:00	Piyapan 10'; Jetsada 13'; Chaiwat 15'; Sorasak 23'; Nattawut 36'; Kritsada 37'	(AFF)	Khairul Effendy 39'	Stadium: Bangkok Arena; Attendance: 5,500; Referee: Hasan Mohammed Al-Gburi (Iraq)

11 October 2015 2015 AFF Futsal Championship	Brunei	2 – 12	Thailand	Bangkok, Thailand
19:00	Maziri 26'; Azizan 38'	(AFF)	Kritsada 1'; Konghla 5'; Jetsada 8', 15', 16', 39'; Ampol 10'; Suphawut 14', 25', 35'; Jirawat 29'; Sorasak 39'	Stadium: Bangkok Arena; Attendance: 5,000; Referee: Tomohiro Kozaki (Japan)

12 October 2015 2015 AFF Futsal Championship	Thailand	16 – 2	Timor-Leste	Bangkok, Thailand
19:00	Sorasak 4'; Jetsada 5', 5', 37', 40'; Suphawut 18', 29', 34', 35'; Wanlop 20', 40', 40'; Warut 22', 33'; Piyanat 27'; Nattawut 37'	(AFF)	Sarmento 15'; José Vide 19'	Stadium: Bangkok Arena; Attendance: 4,000; Referee: Vahid Arzpeyma Mohamareh (Iran)

14 October 2015 2015 AFF Futsal Championship	Thailand	6 – 0	Vietnam	Bangkok, Thailand
16:00	Jirawat 29'; Nattawut 30'; Suphawut 32', 38', 39'; Jetsada 39'	(AFF)		Stadium: Bangkok Arena; Attendance: 10,000; Referee: Tomohiro Kozaki (Japan)

16 October 2015 2015 AFF Futsal Championship	Thailand	5 – 3	Australia	Bangkok, Thailand
19:00	Kritsada 29', 29', 40'; Sorasak 34'; Warut 35'	(AFF)	Basger 22'; Barrientos 36'; Fogarty 39'	Stadium: Bangkok Arena; Attendance: 10,000; Referee: Hawkar Salar Ahmed (Iraq)

== 2016 ==
Friendly Match

19 January 2016 Friendly	Thailand	6 – 4	Malaysia	Bangkok, Thailand
13.00 UTC+7:00	Wanlop 9' (pen.), 17', 30'; Poogun 10', 12'; Punya 16'	(FIFA)	Akmarulnizam 19'; Saiful 13'; Akmarulnizam 34' (pen.); Mohammed 39'	Stadium: Huamark Sports Science Center; Attendance: N/A; Referee: N/A

21 January 2016 Friendly	Thailand	9 – 0	Jordan	Pathumthani, Thailand
19:30 UTC+7:00	Nattawut 9', 27', 30'; Suphawut 11', 24'; Poogun 16'; Jetsada 31'; Punyapon 34'; Atirat 35'	(FIFA)		Stadium: 72nd Birthday Indoor Stadium; Attendance: N/A; Referee: N/A

2016 AFC Futsal Championship

11 February 2016 2016 AFC Futsal Championship	Thailand	5 – 4	Tajikistan	Tashkent, Uzbekistan
16:30 UTC+5:00	Suphawut 7', 30', 32'; Apiwat 25'; Wiwat 40'	(FIFA) (AFC)	Nekruz 11'; Mansur 21'; Rahmonali 35', 39'	Stadium: Universal Stadium, Tashkent; Attendance: 100; Referee: Hasan Mousa Al-Gburi (Iraq)

13 February 2016 2016 AFC Futsal Championship	Chinese Taipei	2 – 7	Thailand	Tashkent, Uzbekistan
16:30 UTC+5:00	Chu Chia-wei 14'; Lai Ming-hui 36'	(FIFA) (AFC)	Suphawut 2', 33'; Konghla 4'; Chang Chien-ying 22' (o.g.); Jetsada 28', 37'; Wiwat 37'	Stadium: Universal Stadium; Attendance: 100; Referee: Hawkar Salar Ahmed (Iraq)

15 February 2016 2016 AFC Futsal Championship	Thailand	3 – 1	Vietnam	Tashkent, Uzbekistan
19:00 UTC+5:00	Suphawut 31', 40', 40'	(FIFA) (AFC)	Vũ Xuân Du 38'	Stadium: Uzbekistan Stadium; Attendance: 700; Referee: Hasan Mousa Al-Gburi (Iraq)

17 February 2016 2016 AFC Futsal Championship	Thailand	6 – 1	Australia	Tashkent, Uzbekistan
16:00 UTC+5:00	Jirawat 5', 39'; Suphawut 10', 39'; Jetsada 27'; Wiwat 33'	(FIFA) (AFC)	G. Giovenali 20'	Stadium: Universal Stadium; Attendance: 500; Referee: Tomohiro Kozaki (Japan)

19 February 2016 2016 AFC Futsal Championship	Uzbekistan	2 – 2 (a.e.t.) (3 – 1 p)	Thailand	Tashkent, Uzbekistan
16:00 UTC+5:00	Jirawat 23' (o.g.); Yunusov 48'	(FIFA) (AFC)	Jetsada 24'; Apiwat 41'	Stadium: Uzbekistan Stadium; Attendance: 2,600; Referee: Christopher Colley (Australia)
	Penalties
	Sviridov (penalty scored); Dilshod (penalty scored); Feruz (penalty scored)		(penalty scored) Suphawut; (penalty missed) Jirawat

21 February 2016 2016 AFC Futsal Championship	Thailand	8 – 0	Vietnam	Tashkent, Uzbekistan
16:00 UTC+5:00	Jetsada 6'; Apiwat 11', 12'; Suphawut 18' (pen.), 18' (pen.), 36', 40'; Jirawat 34'	(FIFA) (AFC)		Stadium: Uzbekistan Stadium; Attendance: 2,000; Referee: An Ran (China)

Charity Match (for Benarong Panpop, captain of Kasem Bundit U. FC)

5 March 2016 Charity Match	Thailand	4 – 1	(Thailand) FTL All-star	Bangkok, Thailand
16:00 UTC+7:00	Apiwat 5'; Nattawut 17', 18'; Jetsada 20'	Report	Tananchai 3'	Stadium: Kasem Bundit University Indoor Stadium; Attendance: N/A; Referee: N/A

Friendly Match

13 July 2016 Unofficial Friendly	Thailand	5 – 1	(Uzbekistan) Almalyk Futsal Club	Bangkok, Thailand
13:00 UTC+7:00	Phukan 6'; Wanlop 16'; Warut 26'; Wiwat 28'; Kirati 35'	Report	? 19'	Stadium: Sports Authority Gymnasium; Attendance: N/A; Referee: N/A

2016 Thailand Five's (Friendly Tournament)

20 August 2016 2016 Thailand Five's	Thailand	2 – 2	Japan	Bangkok, Thailand
18:00 UTC+7:00	Tairong 3'; Suphawut 38'	Report	Nibuya 22'; Shimizu 40'	Stadium: Bangkok Arena; Attendance: N/A; Referee: N/A

21 August 2016 2016 Thailand Five's	Thailand	7 – 5	Iran	Bangkok, Thailand
18:15 UTC+7:00	Nattapol 5'; Suphawut 17', 35', 40'; Jirawat 20', 38'; Kazemi 27' (o.g.)	Report	Esmaeilpour 1'; Tavakoli 12'; Reza Sangsefidi 12'; Javid 27'; Alighadr 31'	Stadium: Bangkok Arena; Attendance: N/A; Referee: N/A

23 August 2016 2016 Thailand Five's	Thailand	3 – 3	Kazakhstan	Bangkok, Thailand
19:30 UTC+7:00	Nattawut 11'; Suphawut 19'; Zhamankulov 40' (o.g.)	Report	Douglas Jr. 5', 17'; Taku 18'	Stadium: Bangkok Arena; Attendance: N/A; Referee: N/A

Friendly Match

1 September 2016 Unofficial Friendly	Thailand	3 – 4	(Thailand) FTL Brazilian All-star	Bangkok, Thailand
15:00 UTC+7:00	Suphawut 10'; Jirawat 28'; Apiwat 36'	Report	Jackson 3'; Thiago 22'; Renato 35'; Tota 40'	Stadium: Vet I Gymnasium; Attendance: N/A; Referee: N/A

5 September 2016 Unofficial Friendly	Cóndor Alejandrinos (Colombia)	4 – 7	Thailand	Antioquia, Colombia
	??	Report	Nattawut 13'; Suphawut 35', 46'; Pornmongkol 39'; Tairong 50'; Jirawat 65'; Apiwat 68'	Stadium: Estadio Tulio Ospina; Attendance: N/A; Referee: N/A

7 September 2016 Friendly	Thailand	1 – 5 (Unfinished)	Morocco	Medellín, Colombia
	Jetsada 29'	Report	??	Stadium: Universidad Nacional Gymnasium; Attendance: N/A; Referee: N/A

2016 FIFA Futsal World Cup

10 September 2016 2016 FIFA Futsal World Cup	Thailand	4 – 6	Russia	Medellín, Colombia
18:00 UTC−5:00	Suphawut 19'; Jirawat 22'; Apiwat 22'; Jetsada 34'	Report	Davydov 12'; Eder Lima 16'; Nattawut 18' (o.g.); Niyazov 25'; Shayakhmetov 26' (pen.)	Stadium: Coliseo Iván de Beodut; Attendance: 1,043; Referee: Christian Espindola (Chile)

13 September 2016 2016 FIFA Futsal World Cup	Thailand	8 – 5	Cuba	Medellín, Colombia
20:00 UTC−5:00	Wiwat 14'; Jirawat 15', 24'; Suphawut 20', 33', 40'; Jetsada 26'; Kritsada 28'	Report	Domínguez 6', 25'; Baquero 8'; Marrero 12'; Marino 19'	Stadium: Coliseo Iván de Beodut; Attendance: 757; Referee: Adalbert Diouf (Senegal)

16 September 2016 2016 FIFA Futsal World Cup	Egypt	1 – 2	Thailand	Medellín, Colombia
18:00 UTC−5:00	Elashwal 37'	Report	Eika 6' (o.g.); Jirawat 23'	Stadium: Coliseo Iván de Beodut; Attendance: 842; Referee: Kamil Çetin (Turkey)

22 September 2016 2016 FIFA Futsal World Cup	Thailand	8 – 13 (a.e.t.)	Azerbaijan	Medellín, Colombia
17:30 UTC−5:00	Suphawut 9', 13'; Kritsada 18', 19', 26'; Jirawat 22'; Jetsada 37', 45' (pen.)	Report	Vassoura 4', 44'; Fineo 6', 13', 44', 48', 49'; Borisov 14'; Bolinha 28', 29', 41'; Poletto 31'; Huseynli 49'	Stadium: Coliseo Iván de Beodut; Attendance: 838; Referee: Fernando Gutiérrez (Spain)

Friendly Match

4 November 2016 Unofficial Friendly	Thailand	5 – 1	(Japan) Bork Kitakyushu	Bangkok, Thailand
19:00 UTC+7:00	Phukan 5'; Chaivat 14'; Panat 23'; Peerapat 35'; Sorasak 40'	Report	Reichi Yanari 13'	Stadium: Kodang Stadium; Attendance: N/A; Referee: N/A

5 November 2016 Unofficial Friendly	Thailand	11 – 2	(Japan) Bork Kitakyushu	Bangkok, Thailand
19:00 UTC+7:00	Panat 7', 8', 30'; Shota Nagashima 8' (o.g.); Burhanuddin 12'; Thanathip 25'; Muhamad 26'; Peerapol 29'; Peerapat 30'; Thanakorn 35'; Nawin 36'	Report	Kazuhiro Suenaga 32'; Yuzaku Saeki 37'	Stadium: Kodang Stadium; Attendance: N/A; Referee: N/A

2016 AFF Futsal Championship

9 November 2016 2016 AFF Futsal Championship	Thailand	Cancelled	Timor-Leste	Jakata, Indonesia
UTC+7:00				Stadium: TBA

10 November 2016 2016 AFF Futsal Championship	Brunei	Cancelled	Thailand	Jakata, Indonesia
UTC+7:00				Stadium: TBA

11 November 2016 2016 AFF Futsal Championship	Thailand	Cancelled	Vietnam	Jakata, Indonesia
UTC+7:00				Stadium: TBA

== 2017 ==
Friendly Match

17 January 2017 Unofficial Friendly	Thailand	6–0	(Thailand) Department of Highways	Bangkok, Thailand
13:00 UTC+7:00	Nawin 29'; Panat 48'; Phukan 52'; Panya 54'; Muhammad 59', 60'	Report		Stadium: Huamark Sports Science Center

19 January 2017 Friendly	Thailand	8–1	Laos	Bangkok, Thailand
17:00 UTC+7:00	Kritsada 2'; Pornpet Sihabut 5' (o.g.); Nawin 9'; Chaivat 12', 21'; Sorasak 29', 37'; Peerapat 33'	Report	Sittisorn Intawong 35'	Stadium: Indoor Stadium Huamark

21 January 2017 Unofficial Friendly	Thailand	2–3	(Thailand) FTL All-star	Bangkok, Thailand
13:00 UTC+7:00	Tairong 2'; Jirawat 36'	Report	Tota 24'; Ramon 30'; Thananchai 37'	Stadium: Kodang Stadium

2016 AFF Futsal Championship

23 January 2017 Group stage	Timor-Leste	2–11	Thailand	Bangkok, Thailand
19:00 UTC+7:00	Lemigio 12'; Bruno 36'	Report	Peerapol 7', 20'; Sorasak 8', 26'; Kritsada 11', 34'; Tairong 13'; Jirawat 14'; Peerapat 18'; Panya 38'; Muhammad 39'	Stadium: Indoor Stadium Huamark

25 January 2017 Group stage	Thailand	17–2	Brunei	Bangkok, Thailand
19:00 UTC+7:00	Tairong 3'; Jirawat 4', 14'; Sorasak 5', 33', 35'; Peerapol 6'; Kritsada 15'; Muhammad 16', 25', 26', 30'; Panat 24', 35', 37'; Panya 29'; Chaivat 33'	Report	Nazirul Haziq Adeni 8'; Abdul Azim Bolhassan 14'	Stadium: Indoor Stadium Huamark

27 January 2017 Semi-final	Thailand	5–3	Malaysia	Bangkok, Thailand
19:00 UTC+7:00	Muhammad 21', 23'; Azwann 25' (o.g.); Jirawat 35', 39'	Report	Nizam 1'; Effendy 9'; Syed 12'	Stadium: Indoor Stadium Huamark

29 January 2017 Final	Myanmar	1–8	Thailand	Bangkok, Thailand
19:00 UTC+7:00	Phyo Maung 15'	Report	Phyo Maung 8' (o.g.); Jirawat 12', 40'; Chaivat 13'; Peerapol 17'; Panya 22'; Panat 27'; Sorasak 29'	Stadium: Indoor Stadium Huamark

Friendly Match

1 August 2017 Friendly	Thailand	3–1	Malaysia	Bangkok, Thailand
16:00 UTC+7:00	Muhammad 3', 9'; Nawin 30'	Report	Mohd Ridzwan Bakri 13'	Stadium: North Bangkok University Indoor Stadium

10 August 2017 Unofficial Friendly	Thailand	3–3	(Thailand) FTL Brazilian All-star	Bangkok, Thailand
16:00 UTC+7:00		Report		Stadium: North Bangkok University Indoor Stadium

2017 Southeast Asian Games

18 August 2017 Round robin	Thailand	4–1	Vietnam	Shah Alam, Malaysia
15:00 UTC+8:00	Suphawut 9'; Muhammad 19'; Chaivat 24'; Jirawat 35'	Report	Nguyễn Minh Trí 28'	Stadium: Panasonic Stadium

20 August 2017 Round robin	Indonesia	4–2	Thailand	Shah Alam, Malaysia
15:00 UTC+8:00	M Subhan Faidasa 3'; Syauqi Saud 18', 23'; Alexander Benhard 39'	Report	Jetsada 23'; Suphawut 38'	Stadium: Panasonic Stadium

25 August 2017 Round robin	Myanmar	2–10	Thailand	Shah Alam, Malaysia
20:00 UTC+8:00	Aung Aung 8'; Aung Zin Oo 31'	Report	Apiwat 2'; Muhammad 5'; Kritsada 9', 23'; Jetsada 15', 25'; Warut 23'; Peerapol 28', 29'; Nawin 36'	Stadium: Panasonic Stadium

27 August 2017 Round robin	Malaysia	3–4	Thailand	Shah Alam, Malaysia
20:00 UTC+8:00	Aizad 24', 32'; Kamaruzuan 28'	Report	Kritsada 4'; Suphawut 12', 27'; Apiwat 19'	Stadium: Panasonic Stadium

2017 Thailand Five's

9 September 2017 2017 Thailand Five's	Thailand	6–3	Mozambique	Bangkok, Thailand
18:30 UTC+7:00	Suphawut 1'; Calo 14' (o.g.); Muhammad 24', 30'; Ronnachai 28'; Peerapol 36'		Magu 17'; Zira 29'; Idelson 38'	Stadium: Bangkok Arena

10 September 2017 2017 Thailand Five's	Thailand	1–2	Kazakhstan	Bangkok, Thailand
18:30 UTC+7:00	Kritsada 22'		Taku 28'; Pershin 29'	Stadium: Bangkok Arena

12 September 2017 2017 Thailand Five's	Thailand	1–2	Argentina	Bangkok, Thailand
18:30 UTC+7:00	Jetsada 23'		Corso 15'; Vidal 39'	Stadium: Bangkok Arena

2017 Asian Indoor and Martial Arts Games

19 September 2017 Group Stage	Lebanon	2–5	Thailand	Ashgabat, Turkmenistan
13:15 UTC+5:00	Tneich 5', 40'	Report	Suphawut 3'; Apiwat 6'; Warut 31'; Muhammad 37', 37'	Stadium: Ice Palace; Referee: An Ran (China)

21 September 2017 Group Stage	Thailand	4–6	Japan	Ashgabat, Turkmenistan
11:00 UTC+5:00	Suphawut 13'; Muhammad 30', 33'; Jirawat 34'	Report	Tamura 5'; Murota 14'; Uemura 22'; Morimura 26'; Saito 30'; Shimizu 36'	Stadium: Ice Palace; Referee: Nurdin Bukuev (Kyrgyzstan)

23 September 2017 Quarter Finals	Iran	10–4	Thailand	Ashgabat, Turkmenistan
UTC+5:00	Sangsefidi 6'; Orouji 13'; Esmaeilpour 14', 20'; Tayyebi 18', 24', 29'; Hassanzadeh 18'; Javid 29'; Oladghobad 30'	Report	Jirawat 2', 33'; Sorasak 10'; Apiwat 40'	Stadium: Ice Palace; Referee: Trương Quốc Dũng (Vietnam)

2017 AFF Futsal Championship

26 October 2017 Group Stage	Thailand	14–0	Laos	Ho Chi Minh City, Vietnam
17:00 UTC+7:00	Chaivat 1', 3'; Weerasak 4', 23'; Jetsada 4', 35'; Peerapol 5', 37'; Nawin 8'; Warut 12'; Muhammad 14', 23', 31'; Nattawut 35'	Report		Stadium: Phú Thọ Indoor Stadium; Attendance: 150; Referee: Mahmoudreza Nasirloo (Iran)

27 October 2017 Group Stage	Timor-Leste	2–17	Thailand	Ho Chi Minh City, Vietnam
14:30 UTC+7:00	Gomes 8', 12'	Report	Peerapol 3', 4', 12'; Vong 5' (o.g.); Sorasak 6', 16'; Panat 9'; Jetsada 10', 19', 36'; Chaivat 12'; Osamanmusa 14', 15', 29', 30', 39'; Weerasak 22'	Stadium: Phú Thọ Indoor Stadium; Attendance: 200; Referee: Vahid Arzpeyma Mohamareh (Iran)

28 October 2017 Group Stage	Thailand	6–3	Malaysia	Ho Chi Minh City, Vietnam
12:00 UTC+7:00	Osamanmusa 11', 15'; Ronnachai 12'; Nattawut 25'; Nawin 27'; Warut 30'	Report	Khairul Effendy 29', 32'; Azwann Ismail 34'	Stadium: Phú Thọ Indoor Stadium; Attendance: 150; Referee: Mahmoudreza Nasirloo (Iran)

1 November 2017 Semi-finals	Thailand	8–3	Myanmar	Ho Chi Minh City, Vietnam
16:00 UTC+7:00	Nawin 13'; Osamanmusa 17', 28'; Nattawut 26', 27'; Peerapol 34'; Chaivat 36'; Weerasak 40'	Report	Pyae Phyo Maung 21'; Nyein Min Soe 27'; Chaivat 40' (o.g.)	Stadium: Phú Thọ Indoor Stadium; Attendance: 800; Referee: Osama Saeed Idrees (Bahrain)

3 November 2017 Final	Malaysia	3–4 (a.e.t.)	Thailand	Ho Chi Minh City, Vietnam
19:00 UTC+7:00	Awaluddin Nawi 1'; Ridzwan Bakri 6'; Awaluddin Hasan 23'	Report	Thanachot 13'; Osamanmusa 27'; Jetsada 30'; Ronnachai 44'	Stadium: Phú Thọ Indoor Stadium; Attendance: 3,100; Referee: Husein Mahmoud Khalaileh (Jordan)

== 2018 ==
Friendly Match

23 January 2018 Friendly	Spain	8 – 1	Thailand	Las Rozas de Madrid, Spain
18:45 UTC+1:00	Rafa Usín 13'; Ortiz 13'; Joselito 20'; Solano 21'; Marc Tolrá 28'; Jesús Herrero 30'; Miguelín 34', 38'	Report	Apiwat 17'	Stadium: La Ciudad del Fútbol

25 January 2018 Friendly	Portugal	1 – 1	Thailand	Torres Novas, Portugal
20:30 UTC+1:00	Tunha 19'	Report	Apiwat 20'	Stadium: Palacio dos Desportos

29 January 2018 Friendly	Thailand	6 – 1	South Korea	Taipei, Taiwan
18:00 UTC+8:00		Report		Stadium: University of Taipei Gymnasium

2018 AFC Futsal Championship

2 February 2018 Group Stage	Thailand	5 – 1	Jordan	New Taipei City, Taiwan
19:00 UTC+08:00	Apiwat 6', 18'; Jirawat 9'; Jetsada 32'; Kritsada 35'	Report	Abu Shaikha 20'	Stadium: Xinzhuang Gymnasium; Attendance: 150; Referee: Kim Jong-hee (South Korea)

4 February 2018 Group Stage	Lebanon	5 – 2	Thailand	New Taipei City, Taiwan
19:00 UTC+08:00	Kobeissy 3'; El-Dine 5'; Tneich 22'; Zeitoun 25'; El-Homsi 39'	Report	Zeid 27' (o.g.); Suphawut 29'	Stadium: Xinzhuang Gymnasium; Attendance: 280; Referee: Hussain Ali Al-Bahhar (Bahrain)

6 February 2018 Group Stage	Thailand	8 – 1	Kyrgyzstan	Taipei, Taiwan
19:00 UTC+08:00	Suphawut 3', 21', 31' (pen.); Apiwat 20', 20'; Nattawut 31'; Jetsada 33', 40'	Report	Salimbaev 37'	Stadium: University of Taipei Gymnasium; Attendance: 268; Referee: Rey Ritaga (Philippines)

8 February 2018 Quarter-finals	Iran	9 – 1	Thailand	New Taipei City, Taiwan
16:00 UTC+08:00	Esmaeilpour 1', 3'; Hassanzadeh 4'; Tayyebi 5', 16', 36'; Javid 21'; Shajari 24', 35'	Report	Jirawat 22'	Stadium: Xinzhuang Gymnasium; Attendance: 300; Referee: Tomohiro Kozaki (Japan)

2018 Thailand Five's

20 October 2018 Friendly	Thailand	4 – 0	England	Bangkok, Thailand
16:15 UTC+7:00	Warut 22'; Jetsada 29'; Apiwat 36'; Ronnachai 38'			Stadium: Indoor Stadium Huamark

21 October 2018 Friendly	Thailand	7 – 1	Malaysia	Bangkok, Thailand
16:15 UTC+7:00	Jetsada 5', 18'; Pornmongkol 19'; Warut 21'; Apiwat 26'; Muhammad 34', 34'		Rahman 15'	Stadium: Indoor Stadium Huamark

23 October 2018 Friendly	Thailand	6 – 3	Uzbekistan	Bangkok, Thailand
18:45 UTC+7:00	Muhammad 6', 22'; Ronnachai 17', 39'; Pornmongkol 31'; Jetsada 35'		Sviridov 19'; Adilov 32'; Choriev 40'	Stadium: Indoor Stadium Huamark

2018 AFF Futsal Championship

5 November 2018 Group stage	Thailand	14 – 0	Timor-Leste	Yogyakarta, Indonesia
UTC+7:00	Sarawut 8', 18', 20'; Suthiporn 10'; Jetsada 15', 28', 40'; Muhammad 25', 26', 36' (pen.); Pornmongkol 29', 31', 38'; Apiwat 40'			Stadium: GOR UNY; Referee: Thi Ly Hoong Ha (Vietnam)

6 November 2018 Group stage	Brunei	0 – 17	Thailand	Yogyakarta, Indonesia
UTC+7:00			Nawin 1', 2', 12', 34'; Warut 2', 14', 22'; Apiwat 4', 17'; Jetsada 5', 6', 15', 16'; Chaivat 17'; Sarawut 30'; Suthiporn 31', 39'	Stadium: GOR UNY; Referee: Saing Sopheak (Cambodia)

7 November 2018 Group stage	Thailand	4 – 1	Vietnam	Yogyakarta, Indonesia
UTC+7:00	Jetsada 19', 34'; Ronnachai 22'; Kiatiyot 23'		Trần Văn Vũ 14'	Stadium: GOR UNY; Referee: Sukry Haji Matassim (Brunei)

9 November 2018 Semi-finals	Thailand	3 – 2 (a.e.t.)	Indonesia	Yogyakarta, Indonesia
UTC+7:00	Apiwat 6', 12'; Kiatiyot 50'		Kustiawan 22'; Faidasa 40'	Stadium: GOR UNY

11 November 2018 Finals	Malaysia	2 – 4	Thailand	Yogyakarta, Indonesia
UTC+7:00	Awaluddin Nawi 11'; Khairul Effendy 34'		Muhammad 2'; Jetsada 16'; Apiwat 25'; Chaivat 36'	Stadium: GOR UNY

== 2019 ==
1 February 2019 Friendly	Thailand	1–2	Japan	Bangkok, Thailand
UTC+7:00	Peerapat 39'		Morioka 16'; Kato 40'	Stadium: Bangkok Arena

3 February 2019 Friendly	Thailand	0–3	Japan	Bangkok, Thailand
UTC+7:00			Kato 20'; Akira 31'; Yoshikawa 38'	Stadium: Bangkok Arena

15 February 2019 Friendly	Thailand	4–1	Kuwait	Bangkok, Thailand
UTC+7:00	Apiwat 3'; Chaivat 4'; Jirawat 7'; Kritsada 20'		Abdullah 30'	Stadium: Bangkok Arena

17 February 2019 Friendly	Thailand	1–3	Kuwait	Bangkok, Thailand
UTC+7:00	Muhammad 38'		Hayat 9'; Al-Tawai 11'; Al-Abasi 23'	Stadium: Bangkok Arena

23 September 2019 Friendly	Japan	1–2	Thailand	Nagaoka, Japan
14:00 UTC+9:00	Kato 40'	Report	Jirawat 11'; Suphawut 20'	Stadium: City Hall Plaza Aore Nagaoka; Attendance: 1,909; Referee: Liu Jianqiao (China PR)

25 September 2019 Friendly	Japan	3–1	Thailand	Nagoya, Japan
19:30 UTC+9:00	Morioka 4'; Hoshi 36', 40'	Report	Muhammad 19'	Stadium: Takeda Teva Ocean Arena; Attendance: 1,906; Referee: Lee Po Fu (Chinese Taipei)

21 October 2019 2019 AFF Futsal Championship	Thailand	12–0	Cambodia	Ho Chi Minh City, Vietnam
11:00 UTC+7:00	Ronnachai 12', 33'; Muhammad 13', 21', 21'; Kritsada 30', 31'; Pornmongkol 33', 37', 40'; Jetsada 36'; Watchara 39'	Report (AFC); Report (AFF)		Stadium: Phú Thọ Indoor Stadium; Attendance: 120; Referee: Hawkar Ahmed (Iraq)

22 October 2019 2019 AFF Futsal Championship	Timor-Leste	1–12	Thailand	Ho Chi Minh City, Vietnam
14:00 UTC+7:00	Nunes 14'	Report (AFC); Report (AFF)	Suphawut 6', 18' (pen.); E. Soares 6' (o.g.); Apiwat 8'; Ronnachai 8', 28'; Jetsada 10'; Nattawut 17'; Muhammad 20', 30', 40' (pen.); Watchara 22'	Stadium: Phú Thọ Indoor Stadium; Attendance: 100; Referee: Tsubasa Oya (Japan)

23 October 2019 2019 AFF Futsal Championship	Thailand	9–0	Myanmar	Ho Chi Minh City, Vietnam
11:30 UTC+7:00	Warut 16', 25'; Jirawat 21'; Suphawut 23'; Jetsada 27'; Kritsada 32'; Nattawut 34'; Pornmongkol 39'; Watchara 40'	Report (AFC); Report (AFF)		Stadium: Phú Thọ Indoor Stadium; Attendance: 112; Referee: Mohammad Tamim Hussaini (Afghanistan)

25 October 2019 2019 AFF Futsal Championship Semi-finals	Thailand	2–0	Vietnam	Ho Chi Minh City, Vietnam
14:00 UTC+7:00	Ronnachai 26'; Kritsada 26'	Report (AFC); Report (AFF)		Stadium: Phú Thọ Indoor Stadium; Attendance: 1,692; Referee: Lee Po-fu (Chinese Taipei)

27 October 2019 2019 AFF Futsal Championship Final	Thailand	5–0	Indonesia	Ho Chi Minh City, Vietnam
17:00 UTC+7:00	Muhammad 10'; Suphawut 17' (pen.); Warut 24'; Kritsada 35', 40'	Report (AFC); Report (AFF)		Stadium: Phú Thọ Indoor Stadium; Attendance: 536; Referee: Ebrahim Mehrabiafshar (Iran)

11 December 2019 2019 Thailand Five's	Thailand	11–0	Oman	Nakhon Ratchasima, Thailand
15:00 UTC+7:00	Kritsada 6'; Jetsada 9'; Suphawut 12'; Muhammad 17', 32'; Suthiporn 23'; Pornmongkol 23'; Nattawut 28'; S. Abdullatif 30' (o.g.); Tanakul 36'; Watchara 40'			Stadium: Terminal 21 Korat

13 December 2019 2019 Thailand Five's	Thailand	6–1	Guatemala	Nakhon Ratchasima, Thailand
15:00 UTC+7:00	Muhammad 6'; Jetsada 15'; Suthiporn 17'; Pornmongkol 18'; Nattawut 18'; Apiwat 21'		Mansilla 27'	Stadium: Terminal 21 Korat

15 December 2019 2019 Thailand Five's	Thailand	3–1	Vietnam	Nakhon Ratchasima, Thailand
15:00 UTC+7:00	Jetsada 12'; Suphawut 23'; Kritsada 29'		Đặng Anh Tài 37'	Stadium: Terminal 21 Korat

== 2020 ==
2 February 2020 Friendly	Thailand	4–3	Malaysia	Hat Yai, Thailand
19:00 UTC+7:00	Ronnachai 1'; Apiwat 1'; Suphawut 34'; Kritsada 35'		Awalluddin 5', 35'; Hasan 17'	Stadium: CentralFestival Hatyai

3 February 2020 Friendly	Thailand-B	4–2	Tajikistan	Hat Yai, Thailand
19:00 UTC+7:00	Anantachai 4'; Suthiporn 12', 23', 37'		Hamidov 21'; Sardorov 27'	Stadium: CentralFestival Hatyai

5 February 2020 Friendly	Thailand-B	5–0	Iran-B	Hat Yai, Thailand
16:30 UTC+7:00	Thanakool 11'; Suthiporn 19', 36'; Watchara 20', 20'			Stadium: CentralFestival Hatyai

5 February 2020 Friendly	Tajikistan	0–2	Thailand	Hat Yai, Thailand
19:00 UTC+7:00			Kritsada 26'; Jetsada 40'	Stadium: CentralFestival Hatyai

8 February 2020 Friendly	Malaysia	4–4	Thailand-B	Hat Yai, Thailand
16:30 UTC+7:00	Bakri 18', 35'; Nizam 28'; Hasan 39'		Nopparut 21'; Nattasak 33'; Supakorn 34'; Sarawut 35'	Stadium: CentralFestival Hatyai

8 February 2020 Friendly	Iran	1–2	Thailand	Hat Yai, Thailand
19:00 UTC+7:00	Aghapour 16'		Muhammad 14'; Suphawut 37' (pen.)	Stadium: CentralFestival Hatyai

== 2021 ==
16 May 2021 Friendly	Thailand	1–0	United Arab Emirates	Sharjah, United Arab Emirates
19:15 UTC+4:00	Jirawat			Stadium: Albateye Multi-Purpose Stadium

20 May 2021 2021 FIFA Futsal World Cup qualification	Iraq	2–7	Thailand	Khor Fakkan, United Arab Emirates
13:00 UTC+4:00	Apiwat 14' (o.g.); Zeyad 29'	Report	Muhammad 2'; Jetsada 10'; Jirawat 24', 37'; Kritsada 24', 32'; Pornmongkol 26'	Stadium: Khorfakkan Futsal Club Hall; Attendance: 0 Referee: Ebrahim Mehrabi Afshar (Iran)

25 May 2021 2021 FIFA Futsal World Cup qualification	Thailand	4–0	Iraq	Khor Fakkan, United Arab Emirates
15:00 UTC+4:00	Kritsada 6', 21'; Muhammad 20'; Jetsada 40'	Report		Stadium: Khorfakkan Futsal Club Hall; Attendance: 0 Referee: Lee Po-fu (Chinese Taipei)

25 July 2021 2021 Continental Futsal Championship	Thailand	6–4	Mozambique	Bangkok, Thailand
17:15 UTC+7:00	Muhammad 9', 11'; Jirawat 9'; Nawin 17'; Apiwat 18'; Peerapat 20'		da Silva 19', 36'; João Luís 22', 28'	Stadium: Show DC Hall

26 July 2021 2021 Continental Futsal Championship	Thailand	6–6	Kosovo	Bangkok, Thailand
17:15 UTC+7:00	Suphawut 15', 36'; Muhammad 17'; Peerapat 32'; Pornmongkol 36'; Jirawat 38'		Salihu 4', 34'; Mazreku 20' (pen.), 23'; Rukovci 32'; Dervishaj 39'	Stadium: Show DC Hall

27 July 2021 2021 Continental Futsal Championship	Thailand	4–3	Uzbekistan	Bangkok, Thailand
17:00 UTC+7:00	Suphawut 11', 26'; Jetsada 36'; Worasak 40'		Jetsada 4' (o.g.); Nishonov 18'; Choriev 28'	Stadium: Show DC Hall

29 July 2021 2021 Continental Futsal Championship	Thailand	3–2	Egypt	Bangkok, Thailand
16:30 UTC+7:00	Suphawut 14', 32' (pen.); Muhammad 29'		Issa 25'; Said 26'	Stadium: Show DC Hall

30 July 2021 2021 Continental Futsal Championship	Thailand	1–5	Iran	Bangkok, Thailand
16:30 UTC+7:00	Nattawut 37'		Rafieipour 2', 22'; Azimi 13', 19'; Tavakoli 33'	Stadium: Show DC Hall

2 September 2021 Friendly	Thailand	7–0	Oman	Bangkok, Thailand
13:30 UTC+7:00	Nawin 2', 11'; Jirawat 16'; Suphawut 16'; Warut 18', 22', 32'			Stadium: Show DC Hall

4 September 2021 Friendly	Thailand	6–1	Chile	Bangkok, Thailand
13:30 UTC+7:00	Suphawut 3'; Jetsada 16', 18'; Muhammad 34'; Apiwat 34'; Peerapat 34'		Espinosa 9'	Stadium: Show DC Hall

13 September 2021 2021 FIFA Futsal World Cup GS	Thailand	1–4	Portugal	Kaunas, Lithuania
20:00 EEST (UTC+3)	Jirawat 16'	Report (FIFA)	Bruno 20'; Erick 27'; Zicky 30'; Pany 32'	Stadium: Žalgiris Arena; Attendance: 362; Referee: Ronny Zumbado (Costa Rica)

16 September 2021 2021 FIFA Futsal World Cup GS	Thailand	1–1	Morocco	Kaunas, Lithuania
20:00 EEST (UTC+3)	Jirawat 40'	Report (FIFA)	Jouad 18'	Stadium: Žalgiris Arena; Attendance: 331; Referee: Irina Velikanova (Russia)

19 September 2021 2021 FIFA Futsal World Cup GS	Solomon Islands	4–9	Thailand	Kaunas, Lithuania
20:00 EEST (UTC+3)	Mana 15'; Ragomo 27' (pen.), 38'; Sia 40'	Report (FIFA)	Nawin 4'; Suphawut 6', 32', 39'; Kritsada 17'; Jetsada 24', 34'; Jirawat 37'; Peerapat 39'	Stadium: Žalgiris Arena; Attendance: 302; Referee: Cédric Pelissier (France)

23 September 2021 2021 FIFA Futsal World Cup Round of 16	Kazakhstan	7–0	Thailand	Kaunas, Lithuania
17:30 EEST (UTC+3)	Tursagulov 3'; Douglas 4'; Chaivat 19' (o.g.); Taynan 23'; Nurgozhin 24'; Knaub 32'; Higuita 37'	Report (FIFA)		Stadium: Žalgiris Arena; Attendance: 464; Referee: Mohamed Hassan Ahmed Youssef (Egypt)

== 2022 ==
15 March 2022 2022 NSDF Futsal Championship	Thailand	8–3	Maldives	Bangkok, Thailand
17:30 UTC+7:00	Supakorn 6'; Peerapat 9', 36'; Apiwat 17'; Imran 18' (o.g.); Adsadawut 19', 21'; Thanathip 28'		Ibrahim 7'; Shareef 14'; Rasheed 38'	Stadium: Show DC Hall

17 March 2022 2022 NSDF Futsal Championship	Oman	1–1	Thailand	Bangkok, Thailand
17:30 UTC+7:00	Yacoob 20' (pen.)		Thanapol 26'	Stadium: Show DC Hall

19 March 2022 2022 NSDF Futsal Championship	Thailand	2–0	Myanmar	Bangkok, Thailand
17:30 UTC+7:00	Kritsada 12'; Terdsak 20'			Stadium: Show DC Hall

20 March 2022 2022 NSDF Futsal Championship	Iran U20	0–3	Thailand	Bangkok, Thailand
17:30 UTC+7:00			Kritsada 24'; Atsadawut 31'; Terdsak 33'	Stadium: Show DC Hall

2 April 2022 2022 AFF Futsal Championship	Thailand	13–0	Brunei	Bangkok, Thailand
17:00 UTC+7:00	Krit 1'; Panut 5'; Kritsada 9', 23', 40'; Apiwat 13'; Abd Khaaliq 13' (o.g.); Peerapat 17', 34'; Ronnachai 22'; Aiman Amin 25' (o.g.); Muhammad 37', 38'	Report (AFF)		Stadium: Indoor Stadium Huamark; Referee: Osama Saeed Idrees (Bahrain)

3 April 2022 2022 AFF Futsal Championship	Cambodia	0–16	Thailand	Bangkok, Thailand
17:00 UTC+7:00		Report (AFF)	Muhammad 5', 6', 12', 14'; Kritsada 7'; Ronnachai 12', 18'; Adsadawut 14'; Krit 18'; Peerapat 21', 23', 30'; Apiwat 23'; Supakorn 24'; Panat 38', 38'	Stadium: Indoor Stadium Huamark; Referee: Fahad Alhosani (United Arab Emirates)

5 April 2022 2022 AFF Futsal Championship	Indonesia	2–2	Thailand	Bangkok, Thailand
17:00 UTC+7:00	Soumilena 1'; Ardiansyah N. 5'	Report (AFF)	Muhammad 11', 35'	Stadium: Indoor Stadium Huamark; Referee: Osama Saeed Idrees (Bahrain)

6 April 2022 2022 AFF Futsal Championship	Thailand	4–2	Malaysia	Bangkok, Thailand
17:00 UTC+7:00	Tanapol 7'; Sarawut 29', 34'; Kritsada 39'	Report (AFF)	Farhan 12', 27'	Stadium: Indoor Stadium Huamark; Referee: Gelareh Nazemi Deylami (Iran)

8 April 2022 2022 AFF Futsal Championship Semi-finals	Thailand	3–1	Vietnam	Bangkok, Thailand
17:00 UTC+7:00	Muhammad 22', 36'; Kritsada 39'		Nguyễn Minh Trí 32'	Stadium: Indoor Stadium Huamark; Referee: Fahad Alhosani (United Arab Emirates)

10 April 2022 2022 AFF Futsal Championship Final	Indonesia	2–2 (a.e.t.) (3–5 p)	Thailand	Bangkok, Thailand
17:00 UTC+7:00	Soumilena 8'; Runtuboy 25'		Krit 39'; Muhammad 40'	Stadium: Indoor Stadium Huamark; Referee: Abdulrahman Ali Aldoseri (Bahrain)
	Penalties
	Penalty scored Penalty missed		Penalty scored

11 May 2022 2021 SEA Games	Malaysia	2–6	Thailand	Phủ Lý, Vietnam
13:00 UTC+7:00	Ekmal 36'; Effendy 36'		Ronnachai 1', 20'; Peerapat 6', 16', 38'; Muhammad 8'	Stadium: Hà Nam Gymnasium

16 May 2022 2021 SEA Games	Thailand	2–1	Myanmar	Phủ Lý, Vietnam
16:00 UTC+7:00	Panat 3'; Kritsada 13'		Thyne Phwet Aung 13'	Stadium: Hà Nam Gymnasium

18 May 2022 2021 SEA Games	Indonesia	1–1	Thailand	Phủ Lý, Vietnam
13:00 UTC+7:00	Runtuboy 23'		Apiwat 23'	Stadium: Hà Nam Gymnasium

20 May 2022 2021 SEA Games	Thailand	2–0	Vietnam	Phủ Lý, Vietnam
16:00 UTC+7:00	Muhammad 2'; Peerapat 10'			Stadium: Hà Nam Gymnasium

11 September 2022 2022 Continental Futsal Championship	Thailand	2–2	Morocco	Bangkok, Thailand
UTC+7:00	Ronnachai 5'; Itthicha 29'		Knia 2'; Fati 35'	Stadium: Indoor Stadium Huamark

13 September 2022 2022 Continental Futsal Championship	Thailand	3–1	Mozambique	Bangkok, Thailand
UTC+7:00	Narongsak 13'; Itthicha 32'; Jetsada 39'		Vasco 26'	Stadium: Indoor Stadium Huamark

15 September 2022 2022 Continental Futsal Championship	Thailand	2–3	Iran	Bangkok, Thailand
UTC+7:00	Suphawut 25'; Itthicha 29'		Derakhshani 8'; Ahmadabbasi 10'; Aghapour 39'	Stadium: Indoor Stadium Huamark

16 September 2022 2022 Continental Futsal Championship	Thailand	2–2 (7–6 p)	Finland	Bangkok, Thailand
UTC+7:00	Itthicha 9', 15'		Korpela 11', 12'	Stadium: Indoor Stadium Huamark

27 September 2022 2022 AFC Futsal Asian Cup Group stage	Iraq	2–3	Thailand	Kuwait City, Kuwait
17:00 UTC+3:00	Zeyad 8'; Ihsan 14'		Worasak 17'; Sarawut 25'; Jetsada 36'	Stadium: Saad Al Abdullah Hall; Referee: Hiroyuki Kobayashi (Japan)

29 September 2022 2022 AFC Futsal Asian Cup Group stage	Thailand	2–2	Kuwait	Kuwait City, Kuwait
20:00 UTC+3:00	Sarawut 6'; Krit 35'		Al-Fadhel 18'; Al-Basam 27'	Stadium: Saad Al Abdullah Hall; Referee: Husain Ali Al-Bahhar (Bahrain)

1 October 2022 2022 AFC Futsal Asian Cup Group stage	Thailand	6–1	Oman	Kuwait City, Kuwait
15:00 UTC+3:00	Warut 4'; Jetsada 16'; Worasak 18'; Sarawut 19'; Narongsak 32', 37'		Taqi 34'	Stadium: Saad Al Abdullah Hall; Referee: Ebrahim Mehrabi Afshar (Iran)

4 October 2022 2022 AFC Futsal Asian Cup quarter-finals	Thailand	3–2	Tajikistan	Kuwait City, Kuwait
17:00 UTC+3:00	Panat 2'; Jetsada 35'; Worasak 40'		Vositzoda 28'; Yorov 34'	Stadium: Saad Al Abdullah Hall; Referee: Ryan Shepheard (Australia)

6 October 2022 2022 AFC Futsal Asian Cup Semi-finals	Thailand	0–5	Iran	Kuwait City, Kuwait
20:00 UTC+3:00			Tayyebi 1'; Derakhshani 22', 27'; Oladghobad 23', 26'	Stadium: Saad Al Abdullah Hall; Referee: Fahad Badir (United Arab Emirates)

8 October 2022 2022 AFC Futsal Asian Cup Third place match	Thailand	2–8	Uzbekistan	Kuwait City, Kuwait
17:00 UTC+3:00	Narongsak 2'; Worasak 27'		Ropiev 2', 26'; Choriev 7'; Tulkinov 14'; Nishonov 16'; Juraev 22'; A. Rakhmatov 23'; Khamroev 31'	Stadium: Saad Al Abdullah Hall; Referee: Ebrahim Mehrabi Afshar (Iran)

== 2023 ==
1 March 2023 2023 NSDF Futsal Championship	Thailand	6–2	Mozambique	Pattaya, Thailand
18:00 UTC+7:00	Itticha 4'; Alongkorn 10'; Peerapat 28'; Sarawut 36', 39'; Narongsak 39'		Vasco 1'; Oséias 13'	Stadium: Eastern National Sports Training Center

3 March 2023 2023 NSDF Futsal Championship	Thailand	1–4	Japan	Pattaya, Thailand
18:00 UTC+7:00	Krit 35'		Kanazawa 8'; Shimizu 13'; Mizutani 25'; Nakamura 32'	Stadium: Eastern National Sports Training Center

5 March 2023 2023 NSDF Futsal Championship	Thailand	1–5	Iran	Pattaya, Thailand
18:00 UTC+7:00	Krit 22'		Karimi 6'; Aghapour 6', 12'; Ahmadabbasi 36', 36'	Stadium: Eastern National Sports Training Center

7 March 2023 2023 NSDF Futsal Championship	Thailand	2–0	Saudi Arabia	Pattaya, Thailand
15:30 UTC+7:00	Peerapat 28'; Sarawut 30'			Stadium: Eastern National Sports Training Center

7 August 2023 2023 Continental Futsal Championship	Thailand	5–0	Myanmar	Bangkok, Thailand
19:30 UTC+7:00	Krit 9', 23'; Narongsak 24'; Alongkorn 27'; Peerapat 38'			Stadium: Bangkok Arena

9 August 2023 2023 Continental Futsal Championship	Solomon Islands	1–10	Thailand	Bangkok, Thailand
19:30 UTC+7:00	Mana 18'		Pitchayut 15', 18'; Peeraphat 16', 29'; Sarawut 17'; Alongkorn 26', 33', 40'; Panat 26'; Worasak 38'	Stadium: Bangkok Arena

11 August 2023 2023 Continental Futsal Championship	Thailand	5–1	Afghanistan	Bangkok, Thailand
19:30 UTC+7:00	Sarawut 5'; Alongkorn 15', 24'; Panat 17'; Itticha 37'		Sadeqi 14'	Stadium: Bangkok Arena

13 August 2023 2023 Continental Futsal Championship	Thailand	5–6	Czech Republic	Bangkok, Thailand
19:30 UTC+7:00	Worasak 21', 30'; Narongsak 24'; Itticha 29'; Alongkorn 29'		P. Drozd 3', 6', 20'; Sarawut 9' (o.g.); Nobolze 23'; D. Drozd 23'	Stadium: Bangkok Arena

26 September 2023 Friendly	Thailand	8–2	Chinese Taipei	Bangkok, Thailand
	Worasak 4'; Panat 14'; Krit 15', 37'; Noppanat 17', 24'; Pichayut 30'; Peeraphat 30'		Chi Sheng-fa 12'; Tai Wei-chun 30'

30 September 2023 Friendly	Thailand	4–3	Malaysia	Bangkok, Thailand
	Peeraphat 5'; Krit 17', 40'; Worasak 27'		Ekmal 7'; Iqbal 16', 33'

7 October 2023 2024 AFC Futsal Asian Cup qualification	Thailand	5–1	China	Bangkok, Thailand
18:30 UTC+7:00	Therdsak 8'; Itticha 9'; Sarawut 11'; Worasak 17'; Panat 29'		Wang Bo 39'	Stadium: Bangkok Arena; Referee: Sukhrob Sattorov (Tajikistan)

11 October 2023 2024 AFC Futsal Asian Cup qualification	Hong Kong	0–6	Thailand	Bangkok, Thailand
19:30 UTC+7:00			Worasak 8', 22'; Itticha 9', 19'; Muhammad 36', 40'	Stadium: Bangkok Arena

== 2024 ==
24 March 2024 2024 NSDF Futsal Championship	Thailand	3–4	Australia	Nonthaburi, Thailand
19:30 UTC+7:00	Worasak 16', 16'; Ronnachai 36'		Rogan 10'; Adeli 13', 21' (pen.); Dib 34'	Stadium: Nonthaburi Sports Complex Gymnasium

25 March 2024 2024 NSDF Futsal Championship	Thailand	2–1	Malaysia	Nonthaburi, Thailand
19:30 UTC+7:00	Apiwat 6'; Alongkorn 29'		Awalluddin 33'	Stadium: Nonthaburi Sports Complex Gymnasium

27 March 2024 2024 NSDF Futsal Championship	Thailand	3–2	Afghanistan	Nonthaburi, Thailand
19:30 UTC+7:00	Worasak 9'; Apiwat 12'; Suphawut 28' (pen.)		Gholami 20', 39'	Stadium: Nonthaburi Sports Complex Gymnasium

28 March 2024 2024 NSDF Futsal Championship	Thailand	9–2	Australia	Nonthaburi, Thailand
19:30 UTC+7:00	Therdsak 7'; Suphawut 8', 13', 38' (pen.); Alongkorn 14', 31'; Panat 15', 36'; Atippong 39'		Adeli 28' (pen.); Giovenali 35'	Stadium: Nonthaburi Sports Complex Gymnasium

8 April 2024 Friendly	Thailand	2–3	Kuwait	Bangkok, Thailand
18:00 UTC+7:00	Narongsak 6'; Apiwat 22'		Al-Baeijan 4'; Al-Tawail 17'; Al-Fadhel 21'	Stadium: Indoor Stadium Huamark

11 April 2024 Friendly	Thailand	2–1	Japan	Bangkok, Thailand
18:30 UTC+7:00	Panat 24'; Suphawut 40'		Kanazawa 17'	Stadium: Bangkok Arena

17 April 2024 2024 AFC Futsal Asian Cup	Thailand	3–1	China	Bangkok, Thailand
18:00 UTC+7:00	Apiwat 12'; Suphawut 13'; Muhammad 16'	Report	Xu Yang 40'	Stadium: Indoor Stadium Huamark; Referee: Hiroyuki Kobayashi (Japan)

19 April 2024 2024 AFC Futsal Asian Cup	Myanmar	0–5	Thailand	Bangkok, Thailand
18:00 UTC+7:00		Report	Itticha 8'; Suphawut 21', 38' (pen.); Muhammad 30'; Panut 35'	Stadium: Indoor Stadium Huamark; Referee: Nikita Afinogenov (Uzbekistan)

21 April 2024 2024 AFC Futsal Asian Cup	Thailand	2–1	Vietnam	Bangkok, Thailand
18:00 UTC+7:00	Muhammad 12'; Worasak 30'	Report	Từ Minh Quang 21'	Stadium: Indoor Stadium Huamark; Referee: Eisa Abdulhoussain (Kuwait)

24 April 2024 2024 AFC Futsal Asian Cup Quarter-finals	Thailand	3–2	Iraq	Bangkok, Thailand
18:00 UTC+7:00	Alongkorn 19', 31'; Therdsak 39'	Report	Al-Husaynat 3'; Sulaiman 16'	Stadium: Indoor Stadium Huamark; Referee: Anatoliy Rubakov (Uzbekistan)

26 April 2024 2024 AFC Futsal Asian Cup Semi-finals	Thailand	3–3 (a.e.t.)	Tajikistan	Bangkok, Thailand
18:00 UTC+7:00	Worasak 13'; Alongkorn 30'; Therdsak 38'	Report	Salomov 20'; Khojaev 23', 29'	Stadium: Indoor Stadium Huamark; Referee: Ryan Shepheard (Australia)
	Penalties
	Worasak (penalty scored); Jirawat (penalty missed); Ronnachai (penalty missed); Suphawut (penalty scored); Itticha (penalty scored); Panut (penalty scored); Alongkorn (penalty scored); Narongsak (penalty scored)		(penalty missed) Alimakhmadov; (penalty scored) Umarov; (penalty scored) Rizomov; (penalty scored) Soliev; (penalty missed) Sardorov; (penalty scored) Kuziev; (penalty scored) Khojaev; (penalty missed) Salomov

28 April 2024 2024 AFC Futsal Asian Cup Final	Thailand	1–4	Iran	Bangkok, Thailand
18:00 UTC+7:00	Jirawat 26'	Report	Karimi 1'; Ahmadabbasi 6'; Hassanzadeh 27'; Mohammadi 35'	Stadium: Bangkok Arena; Referee: Fahad Al-Hosani (United Arab Emirates)

31 August 2024 2024 Continental Futsal Championship	New Zealand	0–8	Thailand	Nonthaburi, Thailand
19:30 UTC+7:00			Suphawut 2', 38', 39'; Krit 8'; Muhammad 18', 19'; Itticha 20'; Alongkorn 28'	Stadium: Nonthaburi Sports Complex Gymnasium

2 September 2024 2024 Continental Futsal Championship	Thailand	2–0	Kuwait	Nonthaburi, Thailand
19:30 UTC+7:00	Suphawut 19' (pen.); Ronnachai 34'			Stadium: Nonthaburi Sports Complex Gymnasium

4 September 2024 2024 Continental Futsal Championship	Thailand	4–6	Guatemala	Nonthaburi, Thailand
19:30 UTC+7:00	Muhammad 3', 14', 16', 28'		Ruiz 9'; Sandoval 23', 40'; Diaz 26'; Paniagua 31', 38'	Stadium: Nonthaburi Sports Complex Gymnasium

6 September 2024 2024 Continental Futsal Championship	Thailand	2–1	Afghanistan	Nonthaburi, Thailand
19:30 UTC+7:00	Itticha 7'; Muhammad 35'		Kazemi 29'	Stadium: Nonthaburi Sports Complex Gymnasium

14 September 2024 2024 FIFA Futsal World Cup	Croatia	1–2	Thailand	Bukhara, Uzbekistan
15:00 UTC+5:00	Sekulić 30'33"	Report	Muhammad 2'45"; Ronnachai 29'15"	Stadium: Bukhara Universal Sports Complex; Attendance: 1,250; Referee: Cristian Espíndola (Chile)

17 September 2024 2024 FIFA Futsal World Cup	Thailand	10–5	Cuba	Bukhara, Uzbekistan
17:30 UTC+5:00	Krit 5'10"; Ronnachai 11'57"; Suphawut 13'58", 25'49"; Itticha 28'03", 28'32"; Muhammad 28'57", 36'07"; Apiwat 31'21"; Sarawut 38'17"	Report	Valiente 03'48"; Morejon 15'10", 36'42"; Cotilla 15'18"; Martínez 29'20"	Stadium: Bukhara Universal Sports Complex; Attendance: 1,341; Referee: Cristiano Cardoso (Portugal)

20 September 2024 2024 FIFA Futsal World Cup	Thailand	1–9	Brazil	Bukhara, Uzbekistan
17:30 UTC+5:00	Osamanmusa 19'18"	Report	Marcel 05'37", 19'29", 35'03"; Felipe Valério 10'00"; Pito 22'12", 30'33"; Marlon 23'25"; Wongkaeo 26'00" (o.g.); Ferrão 36'47"	Stadium: Bukhara Universal Sports Complex; Attendance: 2,040; Referee: Diego Molina (Costa Rica)

27 September 2024 2024 FIFA Futsal World Cup R16	Thailand	2–5	France	Bukhara, Uzbekistan
17:30 UTC+5:00	Thueanklang 24'03" (p); Wingwon 32'32"	Report	Bendali 08'00"; Sigarassy Touré 22'32"; Mohammed 28'46"; Mouhoudine 37'40"; Saadaoui 38'43"	Stadium: Bukhara Universal Sports Complex; Referee: Anthony Riley (New Zealand)

2 November 2024 2024 AFF Futsal Championship	Thailand	13–0	Brunei	Nakhon Ratchasima, Thailand
UTC+7:00	Piyawat 4'; Pitchayut 9', 29'; Teerapat 17'; Thanawat 20', 27', 38'; Chaowala 26', 28'; Athipong 32'; Narongsak 32'; Therdsak 35'; Peerapat 39'			Stadium: Terminal 21 Korat

3 November 2024 2024 AFF Futsal Championship	Timor-Leste	1–7	Thailand	Nakhon Ratchasima, Thailand
UTC+7:00	de Sousa 21'		Fernandes 3' (o.g.); Chaowala 7'; Amarin 12'; Thanawat 13'; Atippong 24', 38'; Therdsak 28'	Stadium: Terminal 21 Korat

5 November 2024 2024 AFF Futsal Championship	Malaysia	1–3	Thailand	Nakhon Ratchasima, Thailand
UTC+7:00	Abu Haniffa 31'		Athipong 11'; Thanawat 20'; Therdsak 34'	Stadium: Terminal 21 Korat

6 November 2024 AFF Futsal Championship	Thailand	2–3	Vietnam	Nakhon Ratchasima, Thailand
18:00 UTC+7	Nguyễn Thịnh Phát (OG) 5'; Tanachot Sosawaeng 31'		Phạm Đức Hòa 12'; Đinh Công Viên 35' 35'	Stadium: Terminal 21

8 November 2024 2024 AFF Futsal Championship	Indonesia	5–1	Thailand	Nakhon Ratchasima, Thailand
18:00 UTC+7	Evan 8'; Brian 22', 27'; Rio 33'; Firman 38'		Teerapat 37'	Stadium: Terminal 21

10 November 2024 2024 AFF Futsal Championship	Australia	0–4	Thailand	Nakhon Ratchasima, Thailand
18:00 UTC+7			Peerapat 6'; Thanawat 17', 19'; Amarin 38'	Stadium: Terminal 21

== 2025 ==
9 April 2025 2025 SAT Futsal Championship	Thailand	4–3	Kuwait	Nakhon Ratchasima, Thailand
18:30 UTC+7:00	Worasak 2', 19'; Muhammad 6'; Ronnachai 38'		Al-Fadhel 11'; Yaser 18'; Al-Omran 25'	Stadium: Terminal 21

10 April 2025 2025 SAT Futsal Championship	Russia	3–2	Thailand	Nakhon Ratchasima, Thailand
18:30 UTC+7:00	Denisov 5'; Sokolov 37'; Asadov 38'		Atippong 6'; Apiwat 13'	Stadium: Terminal 21

12 April 2025 2025 SAT Futsal Championship	Thailand	2–6	Iran	Nakhon Ratchasima, Thailand
18:30 UTC+7:00	Sarawut 9'; Ronnachai 38'		Derakhshani 10'; Sabsi 14'; Tayyebi 18', 30'; Basyar 26'; Golami 39'	Stadium: Terminal 21

29 July 2025 2025 Continental Futsal Championship	Thailand	3–0	Chinese Taipei	Nonthaburi, Thailand
20:00 UTC+7:00	Teerapat 17'; Alongkorn 31'; Chaowala 33'			Stadium: Nonthaburi Sports Complex Gymnasium

31 July 2025 2025 Continental Futsal Championship	New Zealand	0–10	Thailand	Nonthaburi, Thailand
20:00 UTC+7:00			Worasak 2'; Muhammad 6', 21'; Thannathorn 10'; Anantachai 11'; Chaowala 18'; Hawkins 23' (o.g.); Itticha 30'; Ronnachai 36'; Alongkorn 40'	Stadium: Nonthaburi Sports Complex Gymnasium

2 August 2025 2025 Continental Futsal Championship	Thailand	3–1	Belarus	Nonthaburi, Thailand
20:00 UTC+7:00	Worasak 17', 36'; Muhammad 34'		Semianiuk 39'	Stadium: Nonthaburi Sports Complex Gymnasium

3 August 2025 2025 Continental Futsal Championship	Thailand	3–2	Saudi Arabia	Nonthaburi, Thailand
20:00 UTC+7:00	Itticha 9'; Sarawut 16'; Worasak 34'		Al-Asmari 17'; Al-Maghrabi 31'	Stadium: Nonthaburi Sports Complex Gymnasium

20 September 2025 2026 AFC Futsal Asian Cup qualification	Thailand	15–1	Brunei	Nonthaburi, Thailand
UTC+7:00	Muhammad 3', 13', 23', 23'; Teerapat 5', 24'; Chaowala 6', 17', 18'; Worasak 7'; Anantachai 10'; Itticha 10'; Amarin 27'; Alongkorn 29'; Atippong 40'		Teerapat 24' (o.g.)	Stadium: Nonthaburi Stadium

22 September 2025 2026 AFC Futsal Asian Cup qualification	Bahrain	0–4	Thailand	Nonthaburi, Thailand
UTC+7:00			Ali 4' (o.g.); Ronnachai 8'; Atippong 22'; Muhammad 30'	Stadium: Nonthaburi Stadium

24 September 2025 2026 AFC Futsal Asian Cup qualification	Thailand	2–2	South Korea	Nonthaburi, Thailand
UTC+7:00	Teerapat 25'; Muhammad 33'		Shin Jong-hoon 7'; Eom Ji-yong 30'	Stadium: Nonthaburi Stadium

15 December 2025 2025 SEA Games	Thailand	7–1	Malaysia	Nonthaburi, Thailand
19:00 UTC+7:00	Worasak 1'; Chaowala 7'; Muhammad 8', 20', 37'; Atippong 38'; Ronnachai 38'		Awalluddin 12'	Stadium: Nonthaburi Stadium

16 December 2025 2025 SEA Games	Myanmar	0–3	Thailand	Nonthaburi, Thailand
19:00 UTC+7:00			Itticha 14'; Sarawut 22'; Atippong 23'	Stadium: Nonthaburi Stadium

18 December 2025 2025 SEA Games	Vietnam	1–2	Thailand	Nonthaburi, Thailand
19:00 UTC+7:00	Nguyễn Đa Hải 30'		Muhammad 15'; Itticha 29'	Stadium: Nonthaburi Stadium

19 December 2025 2025 SEA Games	Thailand	1–6	Indonesia	Nonthaburi, Thailand
19:00 UTC+7:00				Stadium: Nonthaburi Stadium

== 2026 ==
27 January 2026 2026 AFC Futsal Asian Cup	Thailand	2–0	Lebanon	Jakarta, Indonesia
13:00 UTC+7:00	Worasak 27'; Muhammad 34'	Report		Stadium: Jakarta International Velodrome; Referee: Anatoliy Rubakov (Uzbekistan), Sattorov Sukhrob (Tajikistan)

29 January 2026 2026 AFC Futsal Asian Cup	Kuwait	1–6	Thailand	Jakarta, Indonesia
17:00 UTC+7:00	Narongsak 30' (o.g.)	Report	Muhammad 16', 18', 22', 31'; Sarawut 25'; Itticha 36'	Stadium: Jakarta International Velodrome; Referee: Oya Tsubasa (Japan), Andrew Best (Australia)

31 January 2026 2026 AFC Futsal Asian Cup	Thailand	1–0	Vietnam	Jakarta, Indonesia
15:00 UTC+7:00	Krit 36'	Report		Stadium: Indonesia Arena; Referee: Fahad Al-Hosani (United Arab Emirates), Majid Al-Hatmi (Oman)

3 February 2026 2026 AFC Futsal Asian Cup QF	Thailand	2–4	Iraq	Jakarta, Indonesia
15:00 UTC+7:00	Muhammad 9'; Chaowala 40'	Report	Al-Bayati 8', 22'; Al-Darraji 33'; Al-Bustani 37'	Stadium: Indonesia Arena; Referee: Sukhrob Sattorov (Tajikistan), Abdulrahman Al-Doseri (Bahrain)

6 April 2026 2026 ASEAN Futsal Championship	Thailand	4–1	Timor-Leste	Nonthaburi, Thailand
20:00 UTC+7:00	Muhammad 6', 12'; Charoondej 17'; Narongsak 37'	Report	Bendito 33'	Stadium: Nonthaburi Sports Complex Gymnasium; Referee: Yahya Alathwani (Saudi Arabia)

7 April 2026 2026 ASEAN Futsal Championship	Myanmar	0–2	Thailand	Nonthaburi, Thailand
20:00 UTC+7:00		Report	Muhammad 2'; Sarawut 33'	Stadium: Nonthaburi Sports Complex Gymnasium; Referee: Muhamad Faiz Bin Jamaluddin (Malaysia)

8 April 2026 2026 ASEAN Futsal Championship	Thailand	4–2	Vietnam	Nonthaburi, Thailand
20:00 UTC+7:00	Itticha 16'; Sarawut 20'; Mintada 23'; Vũ Ngọc Ánh 40' (o.g.)		Từ Minh Quang 23'; Nguyễn Đa Hải 35'	Stadium: Nonthaburi Sports Complex Gymnasium; Referee: Kim Tae-wan (South Korea)

10 April 2026 2026 ASEAN Futsal Championship Semi-final	Thailand	4–3	Australia	Nonthaburi, Thailand
20:00 UTC+7:00	Itticha 9'; Muhammad 30'; Mintada 31'; Sarawut 35'	Report	Harb 10', 32'; De Melo 38'	Stadium: Nonthaburi Sports Complex Gymnasium; Referee: Ismail Msawed Yahya (Kuwait)

12 April 2026 2026 ASEAN Futsal Championship Final	Indonesia	1–2	Thailand	Nonthaburi, Thailand
20:00 UTC+7:00	Putra 16'	Report	Itticha 20'; Panat 31'	Stadium: Nonthaburi Sports Complex Gymnasium

1 August 2026 2026 Continental Futsal Championship	New Zealand	0–6	Thailand	Nonthaburi, Thailand
20:30 UTC+7:00			Adinan 11'; Worasak 12'; Itticha 18'; Narongsak 22'; Chaowala 24'; Panat 37'	Stadium: Nonthaburi Sports Complex Gymnasium

2 August 2026 2026 Continental Futsal Championship	Thailand	6–1	Afghanistan	Nonthaburi, Thailand
20:30 UTC+7:00	Sarawut 14'; Chaowala 27', 38'; Worasak 32'; Panat 37'; Mintada 39'		Moradi 34'	Stadium: Nonthaburi Sports Complex Gymnasium

5 August 2026 2026 Continental Futsal Championship	Vietnam	3–3	Thailand	Nonthaburi, Thailand
20:30 UTC+7:00	Châu Đoàn Phát 31'; Từ Minh Quang 34'; Nguyễn Đa Hải 38'		Therdsak 2'; Panat 7', 14'	Stadium: Nonthaburi Sports Complex Gymnasium

6 August 2026 2026 Continental Futsal Championship	Thailand	1–7	Russia	Nonthaburi, Thailand
20:30 UTC+7:00	Panat 17'		Moskalev 2', 15'; Ponkratov 19', 28'; Antoshkin 22'; Valeev 39'; Pirogov 40'	Stadium: Nonthaburi Sports Complex Gymnasium

== See also ==
- List of Republic of Ireland national futsal team matches
- List of Libya national futsal team matches
- Tripoli Fair Tournament
