= 2017 AFF Futsal Championship =

AFC Futsal Championship ASEAN zone qualifiers
Tournament details
- Host country: Vietnam
- City: Ho Chi Minh City
- Dates: 26 October – 3 November
- Teams: 9 (from 1 sub-confederation)
- Venue: 1 (in 1 host city)

Final positions
- Champions: Thailand (13th title)
- Runners-up: Malaysia
- Third place: Myanmar
- Fourth place: Vietnam

Tournament statistics
- Matches played: 20
- Goals scored: 228 (11.4 per match)
- Attendance: 23,270 (1,164 per match)
- Top scorer: (Thailand) Muhammad Osamanmusa (13 goals)
- Fair play award: Myanmar

The 2017 AFF Futsal Championship will be the 14th edition of the tournament. The tournament will be second AFF Futsal Championship to be held in 2017, with the first one originally meant to be hosted in 2016 to be held in early 2017.

The tournament served as qualifiers for the 2018 AFC Futsal Championship.

== Draw ==
The draw was held on 17 February 2017 during the AFF Council Meeting at the Novotel Yangon Max Hotel in Yangon, Myanmar. A redraw was held in September 2017 due to the withdrawal of Australia.

== Venue ==
The all matches was held at the Phú Thọ Indoor Stadium in Ho Chi Minh City.

Ho Chi Minh City
Phú Thọ Indoor Stadium
Capacity: 3,500
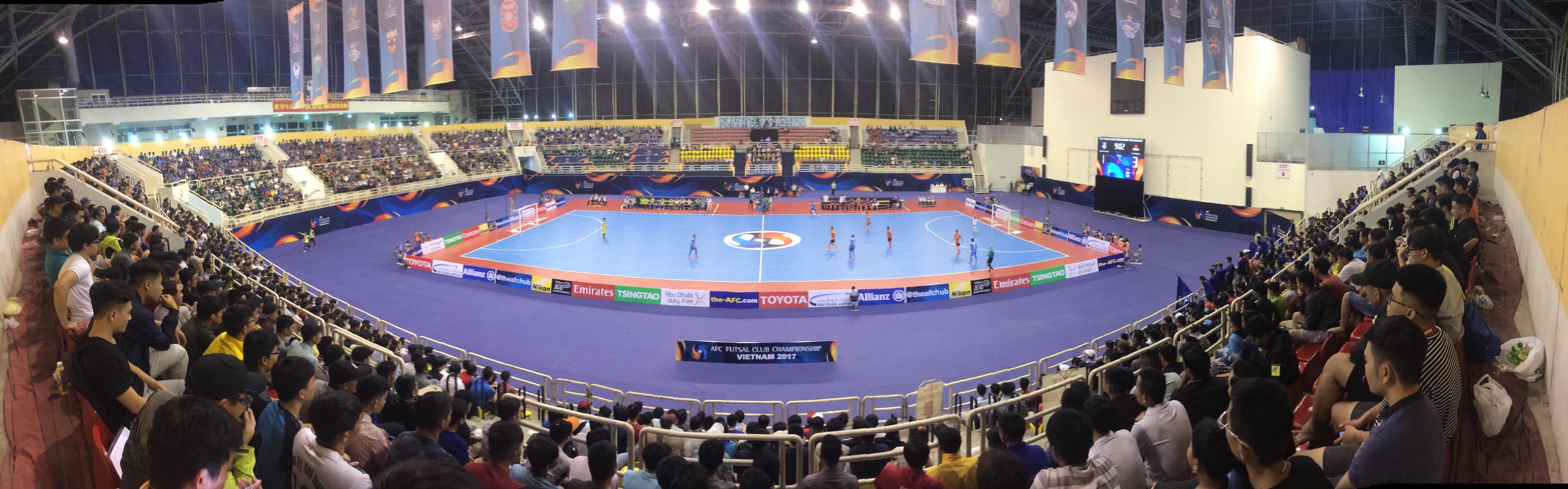

== Group stage ==
All matches are to be played in Vietnam. Times listed are UTC+7.

In the event the Philippines, Timor Leste or both finish among the top two teams in their group the next best team/s qualify for the 2018 AFC Futsal Championship instead since both countries did not submit their entries for the said continental tournament.

=== Group A ===
| Pos | Team | Pld | W | D | L | GF | GA | GD | Pts | Qualification |
|---|---|---|---|---|---|---|---|---|---|---|
| 1 | Vietnam (H) | 4 | 4 | 0 | 0 | 49 | 3 | +46 | 12 | Semi-finals and 2018 AFC Futsal Championship |
| 2 | Myanmar | 4 | 3 | 0 | 1 | 41 | 5 | +36 | 9 | Semi-finals and 2018 AFC Futsal Championship |
| 3 | Indonesia | 4 | 2 | 0 | 2 | 35 | 7 | +28 | 6 | |
| 4 | Brunei | 4 | 1 | 0 | 3 | 5 | 40 | −35 | 3 | |
| 5 | Philippines (Note: Philippines are not eligible for AFC Futsal Championship qualification.) | 4 | 0 | 0 | 4 | 0 | 75 | −75 | 0 | |

Source: AFC & AFF
Rules for classification: Qualification tiebreakers
(H) Hosts
Notes:
26 October 2017
12:00

| Brunei | 0–13 | Myanmar |
|---|---|---|
| | Report | Pyae Phyo Maung (3) 3', 14', 14', 28'; Sai Pyone Aung 7', 7'; Hlaing Min Tun 10'; Aung Aung 16', 38'; Aung Zin Oo 20'; Naing Ye Kyaw 27', 29'; Kyaw Kyaw Tun 36' |

Phú Thọ Indoor Stadium, Ho Chi Minh City
Attendance: 50
Referee: Osama Saeed Idrees (Bahrain)
26 October 2017
14:30

| Indonesia | 21–0 | Philippines |
|---|---|---|
| Syauqi 4', 13', 32'; Ardiansyah 6', 31', 33', 33'; Nawawi 9', 18'; Saptaji 10', 37'; Faidasa 20', 21', 30', 38'; Rasyid 21'; Miranda 22' (o.g.); Mustamu 25', 40'; Sunny 35'; Mushar 40' | Report |

Phú Thọ Indoor Stadium, Ho Chi Minh City
Attendance: 80
Referee: Hasan Mohammed Al-Gburi (Iraq)

27 October 2017
17:00

| Indonesia | 9–0 | Brunei |
|---|---|---|
| Ardiansyah 3'; Ariwibowo 9'; Mustamu 12'; Syauqi 12', 30'; Saptaji 15', 27'; Rahmatullah 36'; Larawo 40' | Report |

Phú Thọ Indoor Stadium, Ho Chi Minh City
Attendance: 100
Referee: Husein Mahmoud Khalaileh (Jordan)
27 October 2017
19:30

| Philippines | 0–24 | Vietnam |
|---|---|---|
| | Report | Vũ Quốc Hưng 2', 3', 27', 37'; Nguyễn Minh Trí 4', 21'; Phùng Trọng Luân 6', 28', 38'; Trần Thái Huy 10', 20', 33', 34'; Phạm Đức Hòa 11', 36', 36'; Cổ Trí Kiệt 12'; Khổng Đình Hùng 16'; Ngô Ngọc Sơn 18', 28'; Lê Quốc Nam 24', 26'; Đinh Văn Toàn 27'; Trần Văn Vũ 40' |

Phú Thọ Indoor Stadium, Ho Chi Minh City
Attendance: 3,500
Referee: Husain Ali Al-Bahhar (Bahrain)

28 October 2017
17:00

| Myanmar | 25–0 | Philippines |
|---|---|---|
| Nyein Min Soe 1', 16', 34'; Pyae Phyo Maung (3) 2', 15', 24', 25', 34'; Naing Ye Kyaw 4'; Khin Zaw Lin 7', 18', 19'; Hein Min Soe 10', 36'; Myo Myint Soe 10', 37'; Hlaing Min Tun 12', 37'; Hermosa 16' (o.g.); Aung Zin Oo 18'; Pyae Phyo Maung (2) 19', 38'; Ko Ko Lwin 28', 38'; Aung Aung 31' | Report |

Phú Thọ Indoor Stadium, Ho Chi Minh City
Attendance: 150
Referee: Hasan Mohammed Al-Gburi (Iraq)
28 October 2017
19:30

| Vietnam | 4–3 | Indonesia |
|---|---|---|
| Phùng Trọng Luân 7', 32', 36'; Nguyễn Minh Trí 40' | Report | Nawawi 12', 35' (pen.); Ardiansyah 34' |

Phú Thọ Indoor Stadium, Ho Chi Minh City
Attendance: 3,500
Referee: Osama Saeed Idrees (Bahrain)

29 October 2017
16:00

| Myanmar | 3–2 | Indonesia |
|---|---|---|
| Pyae Phyo Maung (3) 3', 24'; Kyaw Soe Moe 35' | Report | Syauqi 8'; Saptaji 40' |

Phú Thọ Indoor Stadium, Ho Chi Minh City
Attendance: 120
Referee: Husein Mahmoud Khalaileh (Jordan)
29 October 2017
19:00

| Brunei | 0–18 | Vietnam |
|---|---|---|
| | Report | Ngô Ngọc Sơn 1', 10', 23', 30'; Vũ Quốc Hưng 3'; Đinh Văn Toàn 5'; Trần Thái Huy 5', 24', 26', 33'; Phùng Trọng Luân 9', 34', 39'; Lê Quốc Nam 12'; Vũ Xuân Du 23'; Danh Phát 25', 27', 39' |

Phú Thọ Indoor Stadium, Ho Chi Minh City
Attendance: 3,500
Referee: Mohamad Chami (Lebanon)

30 October 2017
16:00

| Philippines | 0–5 | Brunei |
|---|---|---|
| | Report | Maidin 7'; Timbang 24'; Hasnan 28', 39'; Raimi 33' |

Phú Thọ Indoor Stadium, Ho Chi Minh City
Attendance: 60
Referee: Vahid Arzpeyma Mohamareh (Iran)
30 October 2017
19:00

| Vietnam | 3–0 | Myanmar |
|---|---|---|
| Phùng Trọng Luân 13'; Lê Quốc Nam 40'; Nguyễn Văn Huy 40' | Report |

Phú Thọ Indoor Stadium, Ho Chi Minh City
Attendance: 3,500
Referee: Husain Ali Al-Bahhar (Bahrain)

=== Group B ===
| Pos | Team | Pld | W | D | L | GF | GA | GD | Pts | Qualification |
|---|---|---|---|---|---|---|---|---|---|---|
| 1 | Thailand | 3 | 3 | 0 | 0 | 37 | 5 | +32 | 9 | Semi-finals and 2018 AFC Futsal Championship |
| 2 | Malaysia | 3 | 2 | 0 | 1 | 16 | 11 | +5 | 6 | Semi-finals and 2018 AFC Futsal Championship |
| 3 | Laos | 3 | 1 | 0 | 2 | 9 | 24 | −15 | 3 | |
| 4 | Timor-Leste (Note: Timor-Leste are not eligible for AFC Futsal Championship qualification.) | 3 | 0 | 0 | 3 | 8 | 30 | −22 | 0 | |

Source: AFC & AFF
Rules for classification: Qualification tiebreakers
Notes:
26 October 2017
17:00

| Thailand | 14–0 | Laos |
|---|---|---|
| Jamgrajang 1', 3'; Srichai 4', 23'; Chudech 4', 35'; Satsue 5', 37'; Rattanawongswa 8'; Wangsama-aeo 12'; Osamanmusa 14', 23', 31'; Madyalan 35' | Report (AFC); Report (AFF) |

Phú Thọ Indoor Stadium, Ho Chi Minh City
Attendance: 150
Referee: Mahmoudreza Nasirloo (Iran)
26 October 2017
19:30

| Malaysia | 7–2 | Timor-Leste |
|---|---|---|
| Idris 2'; Abu Haniffa 2', 18'; Awaluddin 19', 26'; Khairul 32'; Azwann 36' | Report (AFC); Report (AFF) | Gomes 8'; Nunes 31' |

Phú Thọ Indoor Stadium, Ho Chi Minh City
Attendance: 80
Referee: Lee Po-fu (Chinese Taipei)

27 October 2017
12:00

| Laos | 3–6 | Malaysia |
|---|---|---|
| Phasaweang 15', 30'; Chanchaleune 38' | Report (AFC); Report (AFF) | Khairul 2', 10', 27'; Idris 10'; Azri 12', 39' |

Phú Thọ Indoor Stadium, Ho Chi Minh City
Attendance: 80
Referee: Mohamad Chami (Lebanon)
27 October 2017
14:30

| Timor-Leste | 2–17 | Thailand |
|---|---|---|
| Gomes 8', 12' | Report (AFC); Report (AFF) | Satsue 3', 4', 12'; Vong 5' (o.g.); Phoonjungreed 6', 16'; Kittipanuwong 9'; Chudech 10', 19', 36'; Jamgrajang 12'; Osamanmusa 14', 15', 29', 30', 39'; Srichai 22' |

Phú Thọ Indoor Stadium, Ho Chi Minh City
Attendance: 200
Referee: Vahid Arzpeyma Mohamareh (Iran)

28 October 2017
12:00

| Thailand | 6–3 | Malaysia |
|---|---|---|
| Osamanmusa 11', 15'; Jungwongsuk 12'; Madyalan 25'; Rattanawongswa 27'; Wangsama-aeo 30' | Report (AFC); Report (AFF) | Khairul 29', 32'; Azwann 34' |

Phú Thọ Indoor Stadium, Ho Chi Minh City
Attendance: 150
Referee: Mahmoudreza Nasirloo (Iran)
28 October 2017
14:30

| Timor-Leste | 4–6 | Laos |
|---|---|---|
| Gomes 8', 11'; Mu Kui Sen 14'; Duarte 34' | Report (AFC); Report (AFF) | Waenvongsoth 2'; Phiphakkhavong 11'; Sihabouth 16'; Phasaweang 21', 40'; Chanchaleune 33' |

Phú Thọ Indoor Stadium, Ho Chi Minh City
Attendance: 50
Referee: Lee Po-fu (Chinese Taipei)

== Knockout stage ==
In the knockout stage, extra time and penalty shoot-out are used to decide the winner if necessary, excluding the third place match.

=== Bracket ===
Semi-finals
1 November – Ho Chi Minh City
Vietnam | 1
Malaysia | 5
1 November – Ho Chi Minh City
Thailand | 8
Myanmar | 3

Final
3 November – Ho Chi Minh City
Malaysia | 3
Thailand (a.e.t.) | 4
Third place
3 November – Ho Chi Minh City
Vietnam | 2(3)
Myanmar (p) | 2(4)

=== Semi-finals ===
1 November 2017
16:00

| Thailand | 8–3 | Myanmar |
|---|---|---|
| Rattanawongswa 13'; Osamanmusa 17', 28'; Madyalan 26', 27'; Satsue 34'; Jamgrajang 36'; Srichai 40' | Report (AFC); Report (AFF) | Pyae Phyo Maung (3) 21'; Nyein Min Soe 27'; Jamgrajang 40' (o.g.) |

Phú Thọ Indoor Stadium, Ho Chi Minh City
Attendance: 800
Referee: Osama Saeed Idrees (Bahrain)

1 November 2017
19:00

| Vietnam | 1–5 | Malaysia |
|---|---|---|
| Ngô Ngọc Sơn 36' | Report (AFC); Report (AFF) | Khairul 10', 12'; Idris 15', 35'; Awaluddin N. 14' |

Phú Thọ Indoor Stadium, Ho Chi Minh City
Attendance: 3,500
Referee: Mahmoudreza Nasirloo (Iran)

=== Third place match ===
3 November 2017
16:00

| Vietnam | 2–2 | Myanmar |
|---|---|---|
| Phùng Trọng Luân 10'; Danh Phát 26' | Report (AFC) | Kyaw Soe Moe 33'; Nyein Min Soe 36' |
Penalties
| Phạm Đức Hòa (penalty scored); Vũ Xuân Du (penalty scored); Nguyễn Minh Trí (penalty missed); Phùng Trọng Luân (penalty scored); Danh Phát (penalty missed) | 3–4 | Pyae Phyo Maung (3) (penalty scored); Pyae Phyo Maung (2) (penalty missed); Kyaw Soe Moe (penalty scored); Naing Ye Kyaw (penalty scored); Aung Aung (penalty scored) |

Phú Thọ Indoor Stadium, Ho Chi Minh City
Attendance: 1,500
Referee: Vahid Arzpeyma Mohamareh (Iran)

=== Final ===
3 November 2017
19:00

| Malaysia | 3–4 (a.e.t.) | Thailand |
|---|---|---|
| Nawi 1'; Bakri 6'; Hasan 23' | Report (AFC) | Sosawaeng 13'; Osamanmusa 27'; Chudech 30'; Jungwongsuk 44' |

Phú Thọ Indoor Stadium, Ho Chi Minh City
Attendance: 2,200
Referee: Husein Mahmoud Khalaileh (Jordan)

== Winner ==
2017 ASEAN Futsal Championship winners

Thailand
13th title

== Goalscorers ==
13 goals

- (Thailand) Muhammad Osamanmusa

12 goals

- (Myanmar) Pyae Phyo Maung (3)

10 goals

- (Vietnam) Phùng Trọng Luân

8 goals

- (Malaysia) Mohd Khairul Effendy
- (Vietnam) Ngô Ngọc Sơn
- (Vietnam) Trần Thái Huy

6 goals

- (Indonesia) Ardiansyah
- (Indonesia) Syauqi Saud
- (Thailand) Peerapol Satsue
- (Thailand) Jetsada Chudech

5 goals

- (Indonesia) Abdul Rohmano Nawawi
- (Timor-Leste) Bruno Gomes
- (Vietnam) Vũ Quốc Hùng

4 goals

- (Indonesia) Bambang Bayu Saptaji
- (Indonesia) Muhammad Subhan Faidasa
- (Laos) Soulichanh Phasawaeng
- (Malaysia) Akmarulnizam Idris
- (Myanmar) Nyein Min Soe
- (Thailand) Chaivat Jamgrajang
- (Thailand) Nattawut Madyalan
- (Thailand) Weerasak Srichai
- (Vietnam) Lê Quốc Nam

3 goals

- (Malaysia) Awaluddin Nawi
- (Myanmar) Aung Aung
- (Myanmar) Hlaing Min Tun
- (Myanmar) Khin Zaw Lin
- (Myanmar) Naing Ye Kyaw
- (Thailand) Nawin Rattanawongswa
- (Vietnam) Danh Phát
- (Vietnam) Nguyễn Minh Trí
- (Vietnam) Phạm Đức Hòa

2 goals

- (Brunei) Faiz Bin Hasnan
- (Indonesia) Johanis Dominggus Mustamu
- (Indonesia) Randy Satria Mushar
- (Laos) Nidnilanh Chanchaleune
- (Malaysia) Abu Haniffa Hasan
- (Malaysia) Muhammad Azri Rahman
- (Malaysia) Mohd Azwann Ismail
- (Myanmar) Aung Zin Oo
- (Myanmar) Hein Min Soe
- (Myanmar) Ko Ko Lwin
- (Myanmar) Myo Myint Soe
- (Myanmar) Pyae Phyo Maung (2)
- (Myanmar) Sai Pyone Aung
- (Thailand) Sorasak Phoonjungreed
- (Thailand) Warut Wangsama-aeo
- (Thailand) Ronnachai Jungwongsuk
- (Vietnam) Đinh Văn Toàn

1 goal

- (Brunei) Maziri Bin Maidin
- (Brunei) Muhammad Naqib Bin Pg Timbang
- (Brunei) Raimi
- (Indonesia) Aditya Muhammad Rasyid
- (Indonesia) Alexander Benhard Larawo
- (Indonesia) Guntur Sulistyo Ariwibowo
- (Indonesia) Mochammad Iqbal Rahmattulah
- (Indonesia) Sunny Rizky Suhendra
- (Laos) Chanthaphone Waenvongsoth
- (Laos) Khampha Phiphakkhavong
- (Laos) Phonephet Sihabouth
- (Myanmar) Kyaw Kyaw Tun
- (Myanmar) Kyaw Soe Moe
- (Thailand) Panat Kittipanuwong
- (Thailand) Thanachot Sosawong
- (Timor-Leste) Ilidio Nunes
- (Timor-Leste) Mu Kui Sen
- (Timor-Leste) Remigio Duarte
- (Vietnam) Cổ Trí Kiệt
- (Vietnam) Khổng Đình Hùng
- (Vietnam) Nguyễn Văn Huy
- (Vietnam) Trần Văn Vũ
- (Vietnam) Vũ Xuân Du

1 own goal

- (Philippines) Julian Pio Miranda (playing against Indonesia)
- (Philippines) Lorenzo Hermosa (playing against Myanmar)
- (Thailand) Chaivat Jamgrajang (playing against Myanmar)
- (Timor-Leste) Andre Vong (playing against Thailand)
