= 2021 FIFA Futsal World Cup qualification (AFC) =

Tournament details
- Host country: United Arab Emirates
- Dates: 20–25 May 2021
- Teams: 4 (from 1 confederation)
- Venue(s): 1 (in 1 host city)

Tournament statistics
- Matches played: 4
- Goals scored: 15 (3.75 per match)
- Top scorer(s): (Thailand) Kritsada Wongkaeo (4 goals)

The Asian qualifying competition for 2021 FIFA Futsal World Cup was an extraordinary men's futsal competition that determines two of the five national teams which are members of the Asian Football Confederation (AFC) playing in the 2021 FIFA Futsal World Cup in Lithuania, which was originally scheduled to be held in 2020 but postponed to 2021 due to the COVID-19 pandemic.

The matches were played at the neutral venue of Khorfakkan Futsal Club Hall in Khor Fakkan, United Arab Emirates between 20 and 25 May 2021.

== Format ==
The five AFC teams playing in the 2021 FIFA Futsal World Cup would originally be determined by the 2020 AFC Futsal Championship, with the top five teams qualifying. Following the cancellation of the championship due to the COVID-19 pandemic, the AFC announced on 21 April 2021 that they agreed to two sets of criteria of establishing the AFC representatives for the 2021 FIFA Futsal World Cup. The first criterion took reference from the top five teams of the most recent edition (2018), while the second criterion applied a point system which calculates the top five teams from the overall ranking of the last three editions of the AFC Futsal Championship (2014, 2016, 2018).

The top five teams for 2021 FIFA Futsal World Cup Asian qualifying in each criterion

Based on the most recent edition
Team	Rank
Iran	1
Japan	2
Uzbekistan	3
Iraq	4
Lebanon	5

Based on the last three editions
Team	Rank
Iran	1
Japan	2
Uzbekistan	3
Thailand	4
Vietnam	5

Based on the results of combined criteria, the top three recurring teams (Iran, Japan, and Uzbekistan) were directly nominated as the AFC representatives for the 2021 FIFA Futsal World Cup. Additionally, the four remaining teams: Iraq (although had not qualified for the 2020 AFC Futsal Championship formerly), Lebanon, Thailand, and Vietnam would play play-off matches over two legs. The two winners would qualify for the 2021 FIFA Futsal World Cup. Although all matches were eventually played at a neutral venue, the away goals rule would still be applied.

== Draw ==
The draw was held on 27 April 2021, 16:00 MST (UTC+8), at the AFC House in Kuala Lumpur, Malaysia.

== Summary ==
The first legs were played on 20 and 23 May, and the second legs on 25 May 2021.

Team 1	Agg.	Team 2	1st leg	2nd leg
Iraq	2–11	Thailand	2–7	0–4
Vietnam	1–1 (a)	Lebanon	0–0	1–1

== Matches ==
20 May 2021
13:00 UTC+4

Iraq	2–7	Thailand
Apiwat 14' (o.g.); Zayed 29'	Report	Muhammad 1'; Jetsada 9'; Jirawat 23', 35'; Kritsada 23', 32'; Pornmongkol 25'

Khorfakkan Futsal Club Hall, Khor Fakkan
Attendance: 0
Referee: Ebrahim Mehrabi Afshar (Iran)
25 May 2021
15:00 UTC+4

Thailand	4–0	Iraq
Kritsada 6', 21'; Muhammad 20'; Jetsada 40'	Report

Khorfakkan Futsal Club Hall, Khor Fakkan
Attendance: 0
Referee: Lee Po-fu (Chinese Taipei)

Thailand won 11–2 on aggregate and qualified for the 2021 FIFA Futsal World Cup.

23 May 2021
19:00 UTC+4

Vietnam	0–0	Lebanon
	Report

Khorfakkan Futsal Club Hall, Khor Fakkan
Attendance: 0
Referee: Nurdin Bukuev (Kyrgyzstan)
25 May 2021
19:00 UTC+4

Lebanon	1–1	Vietnam
Tneich 37'	Report	Châu Đoàn Phát 37'

Khorfakkan Futsal Club Hall, Khor Fakkan
Attendance: 0
Referee: Gelareh Nazemi Deylami (Iran)

1–1 on aggregate. Vietnam won on away goals and qualified for the 2021 FIFA Futsal World Cup.

== Goalscorers ==
There were 15 goals scored in 4 matches, for an average of 3.75 goals per match.

4 goals

- (Thailand) Kritsada Wongkaeo

2 goals

- (Thailand) Jirawat Sornwichian
- (Thailand) Muhammad Osamanmusa
- (Thailand) Jetsada Chudech

1 goal

- (Iraq) Tareq Zayed
- (Thailand) Pornmongkol Srisubseang
- (Vietnam) Châu Đoàn Phát
- (Lebanon) Ali Tneich

1 own goal

- (Thailand) Apiwat Chaemcharoen

== Qualified teams for FIFA Futsal World Cup ==
The following five teams from AFC qualify for the 2021 FIFA Futsal World Cup.

Team	Qualified on	Previous appearances in FIFA Futsal World Cup^{1}
Iran	21 April 2021	7 (1992, 1996, 2000, 2004, 2008, 2012, 2016)
Japan	21 April 2021	4 (1989, 2004, 2008, 2012)
Uzbekistan	21 April 2021	1 (2016)
Thailand	25 May 2021	5 (2000, 2004, 2008, 2012, 2016)
Vietnam	25 May 2021	1 (2016)

^{1} Bold indicates champions for that year. Italic indicates hosts for that year.

== See also ==
- 2020 AFC Futsal Championship
