= 2017 Thailand Five's =

Tournament details
- Host country: Thailand
- City: Bangkok
- Dates: 9–12 September 2017
- Teams: 4 (from 4 confederations)
- Venue(s): 1 (in 1 host city)

Tournament statistics
- Matches played: 6

The 2017 Thailand Five's (Thai:ฟุตซอลสี่เส้า ไทยแลนด์ ไฟว์ 2017) is an international futsal competition. It was organized by the Football Association of Thailand or the FAT. The tournament is set to be a round-robin format with all matches being held at the Bangkok Arena in Bangkok, Thailand on 10 to 12 September 2017.

This edition will feature the host Thailand and three invited teams. The three teams that have been invited are 2016 FIFA Futsal World Cup champion, Argentina, 2016 Thailand Five's champion, Kazakhstan and Mozambique.

== Participant teams ==
The 2017 Thailand Five's is following 4 teams include

Team	Association	Confederation	FIFA Ranking
Team	Association	Confederation	24 August 2017
Thailand (Host)	FA Thailand	AFC	16 (3)
Argentina	Argentine FA	CONMEBOL	4 (1)
Kazakhstan	FF Kazakhstan	UEFA	9 (2)
Mozambique	Mozambican FF	CAF	50 (4)

== Venue ==
The matches are played at the Bangkok Arena in Bangkok.

Bangkok Metropolis	Nong Chok
Bangkok Metropolis	Bangkok Arena
Bangkok Metropolis	Capacity: 12,000
2017 Thailand Five's (Bangkok)	

== Ranking ==
Pos	Team	Pld	W	D	L	GF	GA	GD	Pts	Final result
1	Argentina	3	2	1	0	11	2	+9	7	Champions
2	Kazakhstan	3	2	1	0	6	3	+3	7	Runners-up
3	Thailand (H)	3	1	0	2	8	7	+1	3	Third place
4	Mozambique	3	0	0	3	6	19	−13	0	Fourth place

(H) Hosts

== Results ==
- All times are Thailand Standard Time (UTC+07:00).

=== Day 1 ===
9 September 2017

Argentina	0-0	Kazakhstan

Bangkok Arena, Bangkok

9 September 2017

Thailand	6-3	Mozambique

Bangkok Arena, Bangkok

=== Day 2 ===
10 September 2017

Mozambique	1-9	Argentina

Bangkok Arena, Bangkok

10 September 2017

Thailand	1-2	Kazakhstan

Bangkok Arena, Bangkok

=== Day 3 ===
12 September 2017

Kazakhstan	4-2	Mozambique

Bangkok Arena, Bangkok

12 September 2017

Thailand	1-2	Argentina

Bangkok Arena, Bangkok

== Final ranking ==
Rank	Team
Gold medal	Argentina
Silver medal	Kazakhstan
Bronze medal	Thailand
4	Mozambique

== Broadcasters ==
- Thailand: Thairath TV
- World Wide: Thairath's YouTube channel

== Ranking after the matches ==
Team	Association	Confederation	FIFA Ranking	
Team	Association	Confederation	19 August 2016	24 August 2016
Thailand (Host)	FA Thailand	AFC		
Argentina	Argentine FA	CONMEBOL		
Kazakhstan	FF Kazakhstan	UEFA		
Mozambique	Mozambican FF	CAF		
