= Panat Kittipanuwong =

Thai futsal player

Personal information
- Full name: Panat Kittipanuwong
- Date of birth: 14 May 1998 (age 28)
- Place of birth: Samut Prakan, Thailand
- Height: 1.73 m (5 ft 8 in)
- Position: Winger

Team information
- Current team: Chonburi Bluewave
- Number: 14

Youth career
- 2011–2015: Poolcharoen Wittayakom School

Senior career*
Years	Team	Apps	(Gls)
2016	Rajnavy	11	(7)
2017–	Chonburi Bluewave	27	(17)

International career
2017–	Thailand Futsal U20	8	(9)
2017–	Thailand Futsal	5	(5)
Medal record
Thailand national Futsal team
SEA Games
Gold medal – first place	Hanoi 2021	Futsal
AFF Futsal Championship
Gold medal – first place	AFF Futsal Championship 2016	Futsal
Gold medal – first place	AFF Futsal Championship 2017	Futsal
Gold medal – first place	AFF Futsal Championship 2022	Futsal
Asian Championship
Silver medal – second place	AFC Futsal Championship 2024	Futsal
- * Club domestic league appearances and goals

Panat Kittipanuwong (Thai: ปาณัสม์ กิตติภานุวงศ์), simply known as Ter (Thai: เตอร์) is a Thai futsal Winger. He plays for Chonburi Bluewave in Futsal Thailand League and is the part of Thailand national futsal team in 2016 AFF Futsal Championship.

== Honours ==
Thailand

- AFC Futsal Asian Cup Runners-up: 2024
