= 2016 Thailand Five's =

Tournament details
- Host country: Thailand
- City: Bangkok
- Dates: 20–23 August 2016
- Teams: 4 (from 2 confederations)
- Venue(s): 1 (in 1 host city)

Final positions
- Champions: Kazakhstan
- Runners-up: Thailand
- Third place: Iran
- Fourth place: Japan

Tournament statistics
- Matches played: 6
- Goals scored: 43 (7.17 per match)
- Top scorer(s): (Thailand) Suphawut Thueanklang (5 goals)
- Best player(s): (Thailand) Suphawut Thueanklang
- Fair play award: Thailand

The 2016 Thailand Five's (Thai:ฟุตซอลสี่เส้า ไทยแลนด์ ไฟว์ 2016) is an international futsal competition. It was organized by the Football Association of Thailand or the FAT. The tournament is set to be a round-robin format with all matches being held at the Bangkok Arena in Bangkok, Thailand on 20 to 23 August.

This edition will feature the host Thailand and three invited teams. The three teams that have been invited are Iran, Japan and Kazakhstan.

== Participant teams ==
The 2016 Thailand Five's is following 4 teams include

Team	Association	Confederation	FIFA Ranking
Team	Association	Confederation	20 August 2016
Thailand (Host)	FA Thailand	AFC	14 (4)
Iran	FF IR.Iran	AFC	5 (1)
Japan	Japan FA	AFC	12 (3)
Kazakhstan	FF Kazakhstan	UEFA	9 (2)

== Venue ==
The matches are played at the Bangkok Arena in Bangkok.

Bangkok Metropolis	Nong Chok
Bangkok Metropolis	Bangkok Arena
Bangkok Metropolis	Capacity: 12,000
2016 Thailand Five's (Bangkok)	

== Ranking ==
Pos	Team	Pld	W	D	L	GF	GA	GD	Pts	Final result
1	Kazakhstan	3	1	2	0	15	6	+9	5	Champions
2	Thailand (H)	3	1	2	0	12	10	+2	5	Runners-up
3	Iran	3	1	1	1	12	12	0	4	Third place
4	Japan	3	0	1	2	4	15	−11	1	Fourth place

(H) Hosts

== Results ==
- All times are Thailand Standard Time (UTC+07:00).

=== Day 1 ===
20 August 2016
15:30

Iran	3–3	Kazakhstan
Tavakoli 13'; Alighadr 13'; Javid 25'	Report	Douglas 1', 26'; Leo 10'

Bangkok Arena, Bangkok

20 August 2016
18:00

Thailand	2–2	Japan
Tairong 3'; Suphawut 38'	Report	Nibuya 22'; Shimizu 40'

Bangkok Arena, Bangkok

=== Day 2 ===
21 August 2016
15:30

Japan	0–9	Kazakhstan
	Report	Everton 1', 23'; Suleimenov 8'; Taku 17'; Leo 18'; Douglas 22'; Dovgan 26'; Ryndin 26'; Pengrin 35'

Bangkok Arena, Bangkok

21 August 2016
18:00

Thailand	7–5	Iran
Nattapol 5'; Suphawut 17', 35', 40'; Jirawat 20', 38'; Kazemi 27' (o.g.)	Report	Esmaeilpour 1'; Tavakoli 12'; Reza Sangsefidi 12'; Javid 27'; Alighadr 31'

Bangkok Arena, Bangkok

=== Day 3 ===
23 August 2016
17:00

Iran	4–2	Japan
Taheri 3', 27'; Tavakoli 7'; Alighadr 17'	Report	Nibuya 30' (pen.); Shimizu 31'

Bangkok Arena, Bangkok
Attendance: N/A
Referee: N/A

23 August 2016
19:45

Thailand	3–3	Kazakhstan
Nattawut 11'; Suphawut 19'; Zhamankulov 40' (o.g.)	Report	Douglas 5', 17'; Taku 18'

Bangkok Arena, Bangkok
Attendance: N/A
Referee: N/A

== Final ranking ==
Rank	Team
Gold medal	Kazakhstan
Silver medal	Thailand
Bronze medal	Iran
4	Japan

== Goalscorers ==
5 goals

- (Kazakhstan) Douglas Júnior
- (Thailand) Suphawut Thueanklang

3 goals

- (Iran) Farhad Tavakoli
- (Iran) Mehran Alighadr

2 goals

- (Iran) Mahdi Javid
- (Japan) Nibuya Kazuhiro
- (Japan) Shimizu Kazuya
- (Kazakhstan) Everton Ribeiro
- (Kazakhstan) Leo Jaraguá
- (Kazakhstan) Pavel Taku
- (Thailand) Jirawat Sornwichian

1 goal

- (Iran) Ahmad Esmaeilpour
- (Iran) Mohammad Reza Sangsefidi
- (Kazakhstan) Aleksandr Dovgan
- (Kazakhstan) Anton Ryndin
- (Kazakhstan) Dinmukhambet Suleimenov
- (Kazakhstan) Nikolai Pengrin
- (Thailand) Nattawut Madyalan
- (Thailand) Tairong Petchtiam
- (Thailand) Nattapol Sutiroj

1 own goal

- (Iran) Afshin Kazemi (playing against Thailand)
- (Kazakhstan) Serik Zhamankulov (playing against Thailand)

== Broadcasters ==
- Thailand: Thairath TV
- World Wide: Thairath's YouTube channel

== Ranking after the matches ==
Team	Association	Confederation	FIFA Ranking	
Team	Association	Confederation	19 August 2016	24 August 2016
Thailand (Host)	FA Thailand	AFC	14	12
Iran	FF IR.Iran	AFC	5	6
Japan	Japan FA	AFC	12	14
Kazakhstan	FF Kazakhstan	UEFA	9	9
