= Mehran Alighadr =

Iranian professional futsal player (born 1989)

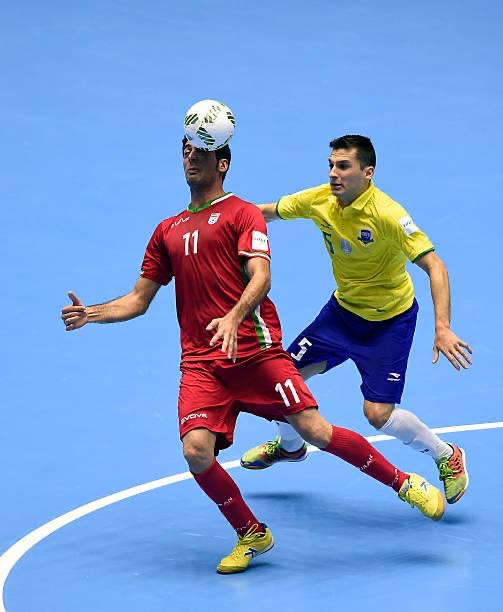

Personal information
- Date of birth: 24 May 1989 (age 37)
- Place of birth: Tabriz, Iran
- Height: 1.90 m (6 ft 3 in)
- Position: Left wing

Senior career*
Years	Team	Apps	(Gls)
2008–2013	Sadra		
2013-2014	DIET Shiraz		
2013–2015	Melli Haffari		
2015–2017	Giti Pasand		
2017–2018	Tasisat Daryaei		
2018–2020	Giti Pasand		
2020–2021	Crop		
2021-2022	Crop		
2022-2023	Qom futsal team		
2023-2024	Kazakhstan Futsal League		
2025-2026	Bulgarian Premiere Futsal League		
2026-2027	UEFA Champions League (Amigo Northwest)		

International career^{‡}
2013	Iran		(12)
- * Club domestic league appearances and goals as of 25 April 2023 ‡ National team caps and goals as of 8 September 2019

Mehran Alighadr (Persian: مهران عالی قدر; born 24 May 1989) is an Iranian professional futsal player. He is a left winger, and currently is a player for Amigo northwest in Bulgarian Premiere Futsal League and the Iran national futsal team.

== Honors ==
=== Country ===
- FIFA Futsal World Cup
  - Third place (2016): 2016
- AFC Futsal Championship
  - Champion (2016): 2016
  - Champion (2018): 2018
- Grand Prix
  - Runner-Up (2014): 2014
  - Runner-Up (2015): 2015
- Thailand Futsal Cup
  - Champion of 2017
- Champion (2025–2026):Bulgarian Premiere Futsal League
- Champion (2025–2026):Bulgarian FA Cup (Super Cup)

=== Club ===
- Iranian Futsal Super League
  - Second place of Iranian premier league champion 2014-2015 : meli hafari futsal team
  - Second place of Iranian premier league champion 215-2016 : Giti Pasand
  - Champion of Iranian premier league champion 2016-2017 : Giti Pasand
  - Second place of Iranian premier league champion 2017-2018 : Tasisat Daryaei FSC
  - Second place of Iranian premier league champion 2018-2019 : Giti Pasand
  - Second place of Iranian premier league champion 2019-2020 : Giti Pasand
  - Third place of Iranian premier league champion 2020-2021 : Crop Alvand FSC
  - Third place of Iranian premier league champion 2021-2022 : Crop Alvand FSC
  - Third place of Iranian premier league champion 2022-2023 : Crop Alvand FSC
  - Player of Iranian premier league champion 2022-2023 : Qom futsal team
  - Player of Kazakhstan Futsal League 2023–2024
  - Player of Bulgarian Premiere Futsal League 2025-2026: Amigo northwest
  - Player of UEFA Champions League 2026-2027: Amigo northwest

=== Individual ===
- phenomenon of Iran league 2014
- The best Flank in Iran 2013
- The best player in Iran 2014

== International goals ==
#	Date	Venue	Opponent	Score	Result	Competition
1	20 April 2014	Uzbekistan Sports Center, Tashkent	Uzbekistan	??-??	6–2	Friendly
2	17 February 2016	Uzbekistan Stadium, Tashkent	Kyrgyzstan	6–0	7–0	2016 AFC Futsal Championship
-	1 June 2016	Iran National Futsal Camp, Tehran	Balan Sanat Fars	2–0	3–6	Unofficial friendly
3	20 August 2016	(Thailand) Bangkok Arena, Bangkok	Kazakhstan	2–2	3–3	2016 Thailand Five's
4	21 August 2016	(Thailand) Bangkok Arena, Bangkok	Thailand	5–4	5–7	2016 Thailand Five's
5	23 August 2016	(Thailand) Bangkok Arena, Bangkok	Japan	3–0	4–2	2016 Thailand Five's
6	3 April 2017	(Croatia) Sportskoj dvorani Osnovna škola Župa Dubrovačka, Župa dubrovačka	Croatia	2 - 4	2 - 4	Friendly
7	17 October 2017	(Iran) Shahid Poursharifi, Tabriz	Tajikistan	4 - 1	12 - 2	2018 AFC Futsal Championship qualification
8	17 October 2017	(Iran) Shahid Poursharifi, Tabriz	Tajikistan	7 - 1	12 - 2	2018 AFC Futsal Championship qualification
9	17 October 2017	(Iran) Shahid Poursharifi, Tabriz	Tajikistan	10 - 1	12 - 2	2018 AFC Futsal Championship qualification
10	14 January 2018	(Iran) Handball Federation Indoor Stadium, Tehran	Belarus	5 - 0	5 - 0	Friendly
11	23 January 2018	(Azerbaijan) Baku Sports Hall, Baku	Azerbaijan	1 - 0	3 - 3	Friendly
12	2 February 2018	(Taiwan) University of Taipei Gymnasium, Taipei	Myanmar	5 - 0	14 - 0	2018 AFC Futsal Championship
