= Sorasak Phoonjungreed =

Thai futsal player

Personal information
- Full name: Sorasak Phoonjungreed
- Date of birth: 24 December 1994 (age 31)
- Place of birth: Bangkok, Thailand
- Height: 1.64 m (5 ft 4 1/2 in)
- Position: Winger

Team information
- Current team: Port

Youth career
- 2009–2011: Wat Benchamabophit School

Senior career*
Years	Team	Apps	(Gls)
2011	GH Bank-RBAC Futsal Club	12	(5)
2012–2014	NE University-Khonkaen Futsal Club	33	(20)
2015–2018	Chonburi Bluewave	37	(27)
2019	Samut Sakhon		
2020–	Port		

International career^{‡}
2015–	Thailand Futsal	16	(10)
- * Club domestic league appearances and goals ‡ National team caps and goals as of 13:05, 23 May 2008 (UTC)

Sorasak Phoonjungreed (Thai: สรศักดิ์ พูนจังหรีด), is a Thai futsal midfielder. He play for Port and currently a member of Thailand national futsal team.
