= Pornmongkol Srisubseang =

Thai futsal player

Personal information
- Full name: Pornmongkol Srisubseang
- Date of birth: 15 November 1991 (age 34)
- Place of birth: Bangkok, Thailand
- Height: 1.80 m (5 ft 11 in)
- Position: Defender

Team information
- Current team: Thai Port Futsal Club

Senior career*
Years	Team	Apps	(Gls)
2011	Lampang Futsal Club		
2011	Thonburi University Futsal Club		
2012–	Thai Port Futsal Club		

International career
2016–	Thailand Futsal		
- * Club domestic league appearances and goals

Pornmongkol Srisubseang (Thai พรมงคล ศรีทรัพย์แสง), simply known as Henry (Thai อองรี) is a Thai futsal defender, and a member of Thailand national futsal team in 2016 FIFA Futsal World Cup. He plays for Thai Port Futsal Club in Futsal Thailand League.
