= Nattawut Madyalan =

Thai futsal player (born 1990)

Personal information
- Full name: Nattawut Madyalan
- Date of birth: 12 April 1990 (age 36)
- Place of birth: Bangkok, Thailand
- Height: 1.70 m (5 ft 7 in)
- Position: Winger

Team information
- Current team: Chonburi Bluewave
- Number: 10

Youth career
- 2005–2008: Debsirin School

Senior career*
| Years | Team | Apps | (Gls) |
| 2009–2013 | Port Futsal Club | 51 | (47) |
| 2014– | Chonburi Bluewave | 83 | (92) |

International career^{‡}
| 2012– | Thailand Futsal | 31 | (28) |
Medal record
Thailand national football team
Sea Games
| Gold medal – first place | 2011 Southeast Asian Games | Futsal |
AFF Futsal Championship
| Gold medal – first place | AFF Futsal Championship 2008 | Futsal |
| Gold medal – first place | AFF Futsal Championship 2009 | Futsal |
| Gold medal – first place | AFF Futsal Championship 2012 | Futsal |
Asian Indoor Games
| Silver medal – second place | Asian Indoor Games 2009 | Futsal |
Asian Championship
| Silver medal – second place | AFC Futsal Championship 2012 | Futsal |
- * Club domestic league appearances and goals ‡ National team caps and goals as of 13:05, 23 May 2008 (UTC)

Nattawut Madyalan (Thai: ณัฐวุฒิ หมัดยะลาน; RTGS: Natthawut Matyalan), is a Thai futsal Winger, and currently a member of Thailand national futsal team.
