= 2026 ASEAN Futsal Championship =

อาเซียนฟุตซอลแชมเปียนชิพ 2026

Tournament details
- Host country: Thailand
- City: Nonthaburi
- Dates: 6–12 April
- Teams: 8 (from 1 sub-confederation)
- Venue: 1 (in 1 host city)

Final positions
- Champions: Thailand (17th title)
- Runners-up: Indonesia
- Third place: Vietnam
- Fourth place: Australia

Tournament statistics
- Matches played: 16
- Goals scored: 90 (5.63 per match)
- Top scorer(s): (Australia) Jayden Jacob Harb (7 goals)
- Best player: (Thailand) Itticha Praphaphan
- Best goalkeeper: (Thailand) Theerawat Kaewwilai

The 2026 ASEAN Futsal Championship was the 19th edition of the ASEAN Futsal Championship, organized by the ASEAN Football Federation (AFF) in the sport of futsal. The tournament was held in Nonthaburi, Thailand from 5 to 12 April.

Indonesia are the defending champions, but were then unable to defend their title after losing to the Thailand in the final.

== Venue ==
All matches will be held in the Nonthaburi Gymnasium in Nonthaburi.

Nonthaburi
Nonthaburi Gymnasium
Capacity : 4,000

== Participating teams ==
There was no qualification, and all entrants advanced to the final tournament. The following 8 teams from member associations of the ASEAN Football Federation entered the tournament.

Team	Association	Appearance	Previous best performance
Thailand	FA Thailand	18th	Winners (2001, 2003, 2005, 2006, 2007, 2008, 2009, 2012, 2013, 2014, 2015, 2016, 2017, 2018, 2019, 2022)
Indonesia	FA Indonesia	17th	Winners (2010, 2024)
Malaysia	FA Malaysia	19th	Runners-up (2003, 2005, 2010, 2017, 2018)
Australia	Football Australia	8th	Runners-up (2007, 2013, 2014, 2015)
Vietnam	Vietnam FF	16th	Runners-up (2009, 2012, 2024)
Myanmar	Myanmar FF	16th	Runners-up (2016)
Brunei	FA Brunei DS	16th	Fourth place (2001, 2005, 2008)
Timor-Leste	FF Timor-Leste	12th	Fourth place (2016)

Did not enter
Cambodia (W)
Laos
Philippines
Singapore

- (W): withdrew after the draw.

== Draw ==
The draw was held on 1 March 2026 at Terminal 21 Korat, Nakhon Ratchasima. The nine teams were drawn into two groups of four and five teams respectively based on their performance of the 2024 and 2026 AFC Futsal Asian Cup. Seeding was shown in parentheses.

Pot 1	Pot 2	Pot 3	Pot 4	Pot 5
Thailand (1) (hosts); Indonesia (2)	Vietnam (3); Australia (4)	Malaysia (5); Myanmar (6)	Timor-Leste (7); ~~Cambodia (8) (W)~~	Brunei (9)

== Group stage ==
All times are local (UTC+7)

=== Tiebreakers ===
Teams were ranked according to points (3 points for a win, 1 point for a draw, 0 points for a loss), and if tied on points, the following tiebreaking criteria were applied, in the order given, to determine the rankings:

1. Points in head-to-head matches among tied teams;
2. Goal difference in head-to-head matches among tied teams;
3. Goals scored in head-to-head matches among tied teams;
4. If more than two teams were tied, and after applying all head-to-head criteria above, a subset of teams were still tied, all head-to-head criteria above were reapplied exclusively to this subset of teams;
5. Goal difference in all group matches;
6. Goals scored in all group matches;
7. Penalty shoot-out if only two teams were tied and they met in the last round of the group;
8. Disciplinary points (yellow card = 1 point, red card as a result of two yellow cards = 3 points, direct red card = 3 points, yellow card followed by direct red card = 4 points);
9. Drawing of lots.

=== Group A ===
Pos	Team	Pld	W	D	L	GF	GA	GD	Pts	Qualification
1	Thailand (H)	3	3	0	0	10	3	+7	9	Knockout stage
2	Vietnam	3	2	0	1	13	5	+8	6	Knockout stage
3	Timor-Leste	3	1	0	2	5	12	−7	3	
4	Myanmar	3	0	0	3	1	9	−8	0	

Source: AFF
(H) Hosts
6 April 2026
17:30

Vietnam	4–0	Myanmar
Nhan Gia Hưng 12'; Nguyễn Đa Hải 21', 22'; Nguyễn Thạc Hiếu 28'	Report

Nonthaburi Gymnasium, Nonthaburi
Referee: Wahyu Wicaksono (Indonesia)
6 April 2026
20:00

Thailand	4–1	Timor-Leste
Osamanmusa 6', 12'; Charoondej 17'; Narongsak 37'	Report	Ramos 33'

Nonthaburi Gymnasium, Nonthaburi
Referee: Yahya Alathwani (Saudi Arabia)

7 April 2026
17:30

Timor-Leste	1–7	Vietnam
J. Fernandes 39'	Report	Từ Minh Quang 3'; Nguyễn Thịnh Phát 5'; Nguyễn Đa Hải 12'; Trần Quang Nguyên 20'; Đinh Công Viên 26'; Trịnh Công Đại 30'; Nguyễn Thạc Hiếu 38'

Nonthaburi Gymnasium, Nonthaburi
Referee: Initan Jan Dlanor (Philippines)
7 April 2026
20:00

Myanmar	0–2	Thailand
	Report	Osamanmusa 2'; Sarawut 33'

Nonthaburi Gymnasium, Nonthaburi
Referee: Muhamad Faiz Bin Jamaluddin (Malaysia)

8 April 2026
17:30

Myanmar	1–3	Timor-Leste
Hae Mar Htay 23'	Report	Borges 4'; R. Ribeiro 9'; J. Fernandes 9'

Nonthaburi Gymnasium, Nonthaburi
Referee: Fitra Fauzi Rahmat (Indonesia)
8 April 2026
20:00

Thailand	4–2	Vietnam
Itticha 16'; Sarawut 20'; Mintada 23'; Vũ Ngọc Ánh 40' (o.g.)	Report	Từ Minh Quang 23'; Nguyễn Đa Hải 35'

Nonthaburi Gymnasium, Nonthaburi
Referee: Kim Tae-wan (South Korea)

=== Group B ===
Pos	Team	Pld	W	D	L	GF	GA	GD	Pts	Qualification
1	Indonesia	3	3	0	0	11	2	+9	9	Knockout stage
2	Australia	3	2	0	1	17	5	+12	6	Knockout stage
3	Malaysia	3	1	0	2	9	7	+2	3	
4	Brunei	3	0	0	3	5	28	−23	0	
5	Cambodia	0	0	0	0	0	0	0	0	Withdrew

Source: AFF
6 April 2026
12:30

Indonesia	7–0	Brunei
Sanjaya 4', 4', 20'; Kareth 10', 24'; Imam Anshori 12'; Rizki 17'	Report

Nonthaburi Gymnasium, Nonthaburi
Referee: Benjapol Mucharoensap (Thailand)
6 April 2026
15:00

Australia	2–1	Malaysia
T. Garner 27'; De Melo 35'	Report	Nor Hisam 7'

Nonthaburi Gymnasium, Nonthaburi
Referee: Moon Dae-sung (South Korea)

7 April 2026
12:30

Brunei	1–13	Australia
Mubin 27'	Report	Giovenali 1'; Guerreiro 3'; Harb 6', 14', 14', 28'; Garnham 12', 32'; Rogan 13'; Jafari 17', 39', 40'; Demerutis 18'

Nonthaburi Gymnasium, Nonthaburi
Referee: Huỳnh Nguyên Thành (Vietnam)
7 April 2026
15:00

Malaysia	0–1	Indonesia
	Report	G. Sulistyo 23'

Nonthaburi Gymnasium, Nonthaburi
Referee: Takeshi Fujita (Japan)

8 April 2026
12:30

Indonesia	3–2	Australia
Putra 9', 36'; Sanjaya 40'	Report	Harb 19'; Garnham 36'

Nonthaburi Gymnasium, Nonthaburi
Referee: Takeshi Fujita (Japan)
8 April 2026
15:00

Malaysia	8–4	Brunei
Amsyar 4', 5', 22'; Syarillizam 24' (o.g.); Hazim 32'; Syahmi 33'; Zakwan 37', 38'	Report	Yamin 21'; A. Azim 25', 33'; Mubin 27'

Nonthaburi Gymnasium, Nonthaburi
Referee: Panadda Khotsenaphattra (Thailand)

== Knockout stage ==
=== Bracket ===
Semi-finals
10 April – Nonthaburi
Indonesia	3
Vietnam	2
10 April – Nonthaburi
Thailand	4
Australia	3

Final
12 April – Nonthaburi
Indonesia	1
Thailand	2
Third place match
12 April – Nonthaburi
Vietnam	4
Australia	0

=== Semi-finals ===
10 April 2026
17:00

Indonesia	3–2	Vietnam
Kareth 10', 13'; Sanjaya 23'	Report	Nguyễn Đa Hải 22'; Trần Quang Nguyên 30'

Nonthaburi Gymnasium, Nonthaburi
Referee: Moon Dae-sung (South Korea)
10 April 2026
20:00

Thailand	4–3	Australia
Itticha 9'; Osamanmusa 30'; Mintada 31'; Sarawut 35'	Report	Harb 10', 32'; De Melo 38'

Nonthaburi Gymnasium, Nonthaburi
Referee: Ismail Msawed Yahya (Saudi Arabia)

=== Third place match ===
12 April 2026
17:00

Vietnam	4–0	Australia
Nhan Gia Hưng 3'; Châu Đoàn Phát 18'; Nguyễn Thịnh Phát 21'; Phạm Văn Tú 39'	Report

Nonthaburi Gymnasium, Nonthaburi
Referee: Kim Tae-wan (South Korea)

=== Final ===
12 April 2026
20:00

Indonesia	1–2	Thailand
Putra 16'	Report	Itticha 20'; Panat 31'

Nonthaburi Gymnasium, Nonthaburi
Referee: Takeshi Fujita (Japan)

== Winners ==
2026 ASEAN Futsal Championship winners

Thailand
17th title

== Broadcasting rights ==
Country/Region	Broadcaster
Indonesia	MNC Sports, RCTI, Vision+
Thailand	TrueVisions, Youtube channel : Futsal Thailand - ฟุตซอล ไทยแลนด์
Vietnam	TV360

== See also ==
- 2026 ASEAN Women's Futsal Championship
