= 2024 ASEAN Futsal Championship =

อาเซียนฟุตซอลแชมเปียนชิพ 2024

Tournament details
- Host country: Thailand
- City: Nakhon Ratchasima
- Dates: 2–10 November
- Teams: 9 (from 1 sub-confederation)
- Venue: 1 (in 1 host city)

Final positions
- Champions: Indonesia (2nd title)
- Runners-up: Vietnam
- Third place: Thailand
- Fourth place: Australia

Tournament statistics
- Matches played: 20
- Goals scored: 138 (6.9 per match)
- Top scorer: (Thailand) Thanawat Koedbangrachan
- Best player: (Indonesia) Wendy Brian Ick
- Best goalkeeper: (Thailand) Charoenphong Prasansat
- Fair play award: Thailand

The 2024 ASEAN Futsal Championship was the 18th edition of the ASEAN Futsal Championship, organized by the ASEAN Football Federation (AFF) in the sport of futsal. Previously known as the "AFF Futsal Championship" this tournament was known as the "ASEAN Futsal Championship" starting this edition. The tournament was held in Nakhon Ratchasima, Thailand from 2 to 10 November 2024.

Thailand were the sixteen-time defending champions, but were eliminated in the semi-final by Indonesia, the first time the team had not made the final at the tournament.

== Venue ==
All matches were held at the Terminal Hall in the Terminal 21 Korat shopping center in Nakhon Ratchasima.

Nakhon Ratchasima
Terminal Hall, Terminal 21 Korat
Capacity : 3,500

== Teams ==
=== Entrants ===
There was no qualification, and all entrants advanced to the final tournament. The following 9 teams from member associations of the ASEAN Football Federation entered the tournament.

Team	Association	Appearance	Previous best performance
Thailand	FA Thailand	17th	Winners (2001, 2003, 2005, 2006, 2007, 2008, 2009, 2012, 2013, 2014, 2015, 2016, 2017, 2018, 2019, 2022)
Indonesia	FA Indonesia	16th	Winners (2010)
Malaysia	FA Malaysia	18th	Runners-up (2003, 2005, 2010, 2017, 2018)
Australia	Football Australia	7th	Runners-up (2007, 2013, 2014, 2015)
Vietnam	Vietnam FF	15th	Runners-up (2009, 2012)
Myanmar	Myanmar FF	15th	Runners-up (2016)
Brunei	FA Brunei DS	15th	Fourth place (2001, 2005, 2008)
Cambodia	FF Cambodia	7th	Fourth place (2003, 2006)
Timor-Leste	FF Timor-Leste	11th	Fourth place (2016)

Did not enter
Laos
Philippines
Singapore

=== Draw ===
The draw was held on 27 September 2024. The nine teams were drawn into four groups of two teams with the last group having three teams with seeding based on their performance of the previous edition. Seeding was shown in parentheses.

Pot 1	Pot 2	Pot 3	Pot 4
Thailand (1) (hosts); Indonesia (2)	Vietnam (3); Myanmar (4)	Malaysia (5); Australia (6)	Cambodia (7); Brunei (8); Timor-Leste (9)

== Group stage ==
All times are local time: UTC+7.

=== Group A ===
Pos	Team	Pld	W	D	L	GF	GA	GD	Pts	Qualification
1	Vietnam	4	4	0	0	23	3	+20	12	Knockout stage
2	Thailand (H)	4	3	0	1	25	5	+20	9	Knockout stage
3	Malaysia	4	2	0	2	14	5	+9	6	
4	Timor-Leste	4	1	0	3	7	16	−9	3	
5	Brunei	4	0	0	4	3	43	−40	0	

Source: ASEAN
(H) Hosts
2 November 2024
15:30

Vietnam	4–1	Timor-Leste
Nhan Gia Hưng 3'; Nguyễn Mạnh Dũng 25'; Nguyễn Thịnh Phát 36', 40'	Report	Cesario 23'

Terminal Hall, Nakhon Ratchasima
Referee: Wahyu Wicaksono (Indonesia)
2 November 2024
18:00

Thailand	13–0	Brunei
Piyawat 4'; Pitchayut 9', 29'; Teerapat 17'; Thanawat 20', 27', 38'; Chaowala 26', 28'; Athipong 32'; Narongsak 32'; Therdsak 35'; Peerapat 39'	Report

Terminal Hall, Nakhon Ratchasima

3 November 2024
15:30

Brunei	0–11	Malaysia
	Report	Daniel 4', 25'; Ridzwan 7', 33'; Syahir 11', 22', 36'; Awalluddin 21'; Haniffa 26'; Faris 27', 40'

Terminal Hall, Nakhon Ratchasima
Referee: Moon Dae-sung (South Korea)
3 November 2024
18:00

Timor-Leste	1–7	Thailand
João 21'	Report	Miguel 3' (o.g.); Chaowala 7'; Amarin 12'; Thanawat 13'; Atippong 24', 38'; Therdsak 28'

Terminal Hall, Nakhon Ratchasima
Attendance: 1,630
Referee: Leung Chung Yin (Hong Kong)

4 November 2024
15:30

Malaysia	0–2	Vietnam
	Report	Từ Minh Quang 27'; Nguyễn Thịnh Phát 34'

Terminal Hall, Nakhon Ratchasima
Referee: Wahyu Wicaksono (Indonesia)
4 November 2024
18:00

Brunei	3–5	Timor-Leste
	Report

Terminal Hall, Nakhon Ratchasima

5 November 2024
15:30

Vietnam	14–0	Brunei
Trần Thái Huy 2', 3', 27'; Châu Đoàn Phát 10'; Trần Nhật Trung 21'; Nguyễn Mạnh Dũng 22'; Phạm Đức Hòa 26'; Nguyễn Thịnh Phát 31'; Từ Minh Quang 33', 34'; Huỳnh Mi Woen 35', 36'; Nguyễn Đa Hải 38'; Vũ Ngọc Ánh 39'	Report

Terminal Hall, Nakhon Ratchasima
Referee: Wint Phyo Pyae Sone (Myanmar)
5 November 2024
18:00

Malaysia	1–3	Thailand
Haniffa 31'	Report	Atippong 11'; Therdsak 34'; Thanawat 45'

Terminal Hall, Nakhon Ratchasima
Attendance: 2,300
Referee: Leung Chung Yin (Hong Kong)

6 November 2024
15:30

Timor-Leste	0–2	Malaysia
	Report

Terminal Hall, Nakhon Ratchasima
Referee: Wahyu Wicaksono (Indonesia)
6 November 2024
18:00

Thailand	2–3	Vietnam
Nguyễn Thịnh Phát 5' (o.g.); Tanachot 31'	Report	Phạm Đức Hòa 12'; Đinh Công Viên 35', 36'

Terminal Hall, Nakhon Ratchasima
Attendance: 2,416
Referee: Moon Dae-sung (South Korea)

=== Group B ===
Pos	Team	Pld	W	D	L	GF	GA	GD	Pts	Qualification
1	Indonesia	3	3	0	0	17	2	+15	9	Knockout stage
2	Australia	3	1	1	1	13	8	+5	4	Knockout stage
3	Myanmar	3	1	1	1	9	12	−3	4	
4	Cambodia	3	0	0	3	6	23	−17	0	

Source: ASEAN
4 November 2024
10:30

Myanmar	3–3	Australia
Mai Soe Myat Htwe 9'; Naing Linn Tun Kyaw 23'; Htut Wai Tun 38'	Report	Giovenali 4', 29'; De Melo 19'

Terminal Hall, Nakhon Ratchasima
Referee: Mucharoensap Benjapol (Thailand)
4 November 2024
13:00

Indonesia	9–0	Cambodia
Adriansyah 2'; Sachakboth 3' (o.g.); Samuel Eko 5'; Iqbal 9', 34'; Ick 15'; Guntur 19'; Syaifullah 31'; Nizar 35'	Report

Terminal Hall, Nakhon Ratchasima
Referee: Muhammad Faiz Jamaluddin (Malaysia)

5 November 2024
10:30

Cambodia	4–5	Myanmar
	Report

Terminal Hall, Nakhon Ratchasima
Referee: Mucharoensap Benjapol (Thailand)
5 November 2024
13:00

Australia	1–3	Indonesia
Lynch 20'	Report	Soumilena 7'; Humandri 15', 35'

Terminal Hall, Nakhon Ratchasima
Referee: Moon Dae-sung (South Korea)

6 November 2024
10:30

Australia	9–2	Cambodia
Lynch 2'; Guerreiro 4', 21'; Sewell 20', 32'; Garner 23'; Rogan 24', 25'; Sweedan 38'	Report	Keo 15', 17'

Terminal Hall, Nakhon Ratchasima
6 November 2024
13:00

Indonesia	5–1	Myanmar
Pangestu 15'; Ick 22'; Eko 23'; Firman 31'; Romi 33'	Report	Lwin 26'

Terminal Hall, Nakhon Ratchasima
Referee: Muhammad Faiz Jamaluddin (Malaysia)

== Knockout stage ==
=== Bracket ===
Semi-finals
8 November – Korat
Vietnam (a.e.t.)	5
Australia	4
8 November – Korat
Indonesia	5
Thailand	1

Final
10 November – Korat
Vietnam	0
Indonesia	2
Third place
10 November – Korat
Australia	0
Thailand	4

=== Semi-finals ===
8 November 2024
15:00

Vietnam	5–4 (a.e.t.)	Australia
Từ Minh Quang 31' (pen.); Nguyễn Đa Hải 36', 38'; Nguyễn Thịnh Phát 46', 50' (pen.)	Report	Sewell 6'; Rogan 20'; Guerreiro 36'; Lynch 49'

Terminal Hall, Nakhon Ratchasima
Referee: Moon Dae-sung (South Korea)
8 November 2024
18:00

Indonesia	5–1	Thailand
Soumilena 8'; Ick 22', 27'; Pangestu 33'; Adriansyah 38'	Report	Teerapat 37'

Terminal Hall, Nakhon Ratchasima
Attendance: 3,264
Referee: Leung Chung Yin (Hong Kong)

=== Third place match ===
10 November 2024
15:00

Australia	0–4	Thailand
	Report	Peerapat 6'; Thanawat 17', 19'; Amarin 38'

Terminal Hall, Nakhon Ratchasima
Referee: Wahyu Wicaksono (Indonesia)

=== Final ===
10 November 2024
18:00

Vietnam	0–2	Indonesia
	Report	Syaifullah 8'; Xavier 39'

Terminal Hall, Nakhon Ratchasima
Referee: Moon Dae-sung (South Korea)

== Winners ==
2024 ASEAN Futsal Championship winners

Indonesia
2nd title

== See also ==
- 2024 ASEAN Women's Futsal Championship
