= 2022 AFF Futsal Championship =

Tournament details
- Host country: Thailand
- City: Bangkok
- Dates: 2–10 April
- Teams: 9 (from 1 sub-confederation)
- Venue: Indoor Stadium Huamark

Final positions
- Champions: Thailand (16th title)
- Runners-up: Indonesia
- Third place: Vietnam
- Fourth place: Myanmar

Tournament statistics
- Matches played: 20
- Goals scored: 161 (8.05 per match)
- Attendance: 3,255 (163 per match)
- Top scorer(s): (Thailand) Muhammad Osamanmusa (11 goals)
- Best player: (Thailand) Kritsada Wongkaeo
- Best goalkeeper: (Indonesia) Muhammad Albagir

The 2022 AFF Futsal Championship was the 17th edition of the AFF Futsal Championship, organized by the ASEAN Football Federation (AFF) in the sport of futsal. The tournament was held in Bangkok, Thailand. The top three finishing teams of the tournament will qualify for the 2022 AFC Futsal Asian Cup in Kuwait as AFF's representatives.

Thailand won the tournament for the ninth time in a row after winning the final 5–3 in the penalty shootout against Indonesia.

== Entrants ==
There was no qualification, and all entrants advanced to the final tournament. The following 9 teams from member associations of the ASEAN Football Federation entered the tournament. Brunei came back for this tournament after 4 years of absence since their last appearance in 2018 AFF Futsal Championship.

Team	Association	Appearance	Previous best performance
Thailand	FA Thailand	16th	Winners (2001, 2003, 2005, 2006, 2007, 2008, 2009, 2012, 2013, 2014, 2015, 2016, 2017, 2018, 2019)
Indonesia	FA Indonesia	15th	Winners (2010)
Malaysia	FA Malaysia	17th	Runners-up (2003, 2005, 2010, 2017, 2018)
Australia	Football Australia	6th	Runners-up (2007, 2013, 2014, 2015)
Vietnam	Vietnam FF	14th	Runners-up (2009, 2012)
Myanmar	Myanmar FF	14th	Runners-up (2016)
Brunei	FA Brunei DS	14th	Fourth place (2001, 2005 and 2008)
Cambodia	FF Cambodia	6th	Fourth place (2003, 2006)
Timor-Leste	FF Timor-Leste	10th	Fourth place (2016)

Did not enter
Laos
Philippines
Singapore

== Venue ==
All matches are held in Indoor Stadium Huamark, Bangkok.

Bangkok
Indoor Stadium Huamark
Capacity: 8,000
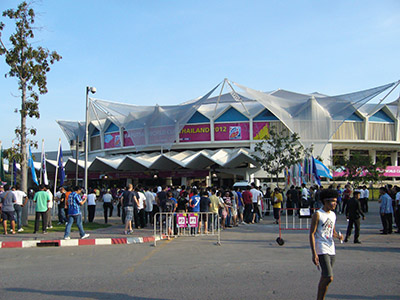

== Group stage ==
All times are local time: UTC+7.

=== Group A ===
Pos	Team	Pld	W	D	L	GF	GA	GD	Pts	Qualification
1	Thailand (H)	4	3	1	0	35	4	+31	10	Knockout stage
2	Indonesia	4	3	1	0	30	5	+25	10	Knockout stage
3	Malaysia	4	2	0	2	20	15	+5	6	
4	Cambodia	4	0	1	3	10	36	−26	1	
5	Brunei	4	0	1	3	2	37	−35	1	

Source: AFF AFC
(H) Hosts
2 April 2022
15:00

Malaysia	7–6	Cambodia
Sichamroeun 1' (o.g.), 29' (o.g.); Khairul 9', 39'; Saiful 19'; Haniffa 23', 32'	Report (AFF)	Sereyvong 6', 25'; Sichamroeun 17'; Diamant 18'; Chanmony 33'; Sothydaroth 40'

Indoor Stadium Huamark, Bangkok
Attendance: 50
Referee: Leung Chung Yin (Hong Kong)
2 April 2022
17:00

Thailand	13–0	Brunei
Krit 1'; Panat 5'; Kritsada 9', 23', 40'; Apiwat 13'; Khaliq 13' (o.g.); Peerapat 17', 34'; Ronnachai 22'; Aiman 25' (o.g.); Osamanmusa 37', 38'	Report (AFF)

Indoor Stadium Huamark, Bangkok
Attendance: 100
Referee: Osama Saeed Idrees (Bahrain)

3 April 2022
15:00

Brunei	0–12	Indonesia
	Report (AFF)	Soumilena 2', 3'; Pangestu 5'; Sunny 7'; Syauqi 13', 20'; Runtuboy 19', 33'; Ardiansyah N. 21'; Dewa 27', 34'; Khalil 39' (o.g.)

Indoor Stadium Huamark, Bangkok
Attendance: 50
Referee: Gelareh Nazemi Deylami (Iran)
3 April 2022
17:00

Cambodia	0–16	Thailand
	Report (AFF)	Osamanmusa 5', 6', 12', 14'; Kritsada 7'; Ronnachai 12', 18'; Atsadawut 14'; Krit 18'; Peerapat 21', 23', 30'; Apiwat 23'; Supakorn 24'; Panat 38', 38'

Indoor Stadium Huamark, Bangkok
Attendance: 200
Referee: Fahad Alhosani (United Arab Emirates)

4 April 2022
15:00

Indonesia	5–1	Malaysia
Soumilena 21', 35'; Firman 28'; Ardiansyah N. 29', 29'	Report (AFF)	Ridzwan 22'

Indoor Stadium Huamark, Bangkok
Attendance: 0
Referee: Fahad Alhosani (United Arab Emirates)
4 April 2022
17:00

Brunei	2–2	Cambodia
Zairul 20'; Sophat 34' (o.g.)	Report (AFF)	Khalil 10' (o.g.); Chanmony 20'

Indoor Stadium Huamark, Bangkok
Attendance: 10
Referee: Leung Chung Yin (Hong Kong)

5 April 2022
15:00

Malaysia	10–0	Brunei
Ekmal 8', 34'; Shahrezan 18' (o.g.); Sufri 21', 22'; Farhan 33'; Haniffa 33'; Joshua 37', 37'; Aidil 38'	Report (AFF)

Indoor Stadium Huamark, Bangkok
Attendance: 50
Referee: Andrew Best (Australia)
5 April 2022
17:00

Indonesia	2–2	Thailand
Soumilena 1'; Ardiansyah N. 5'	Report (AFF)	Osamanmusa 11', 35'

Indoor Stadium Huamark, Bangkok
Attendance: 200
Referee: Osama Saeed Idrees (Bahrain)

6 April 2022
15:00

Cambodia	2–11	Indonesia
Sirotha 8'; Chanmony 19'	Report (AFF)	Runtuboy 6', 22', 31', 36'; Iqbal 12'; Syauqi 21', 21', 22'; Marvin 28'; Diamant 30' (o.g.); Soumilena 37'

Indoor Stadium Huamark, Bangkok
Attendance: 50
Referee: Andrew Best (Australia)
6 April 2022
17:00

Thailand	4–2	Malaysia
Tanapol 7'; Sarawut 29', 34'; Kritsada 39'	Report (AFF)	Farhan 12', 27'

Indoor Stadium Huamark, Bangkok
Attendance: 250
Referee: Gelareh Nazemi Deylami (Iran)

=== Group B ===
Pos	Team	Pld	W	D	L	GF	GA	GD	Pts	Qualification
1	Myanmar	3	2	1	0	17	5	+12	7	Knockout stage
2	Vietnam	3	2	1	0	13	3	+10	7	Knockout stage
3	Australia	3	1	0	2	9	15	−6	3	
4	Timor-Leste	3	0	0	3	8	24	−16	0	

Source: AFF AFC
4 April 2022
11:00

Vietnam	1–1	Myanmar
Nhan Gia Hưng 13'	Report (AFF)	Myo Myint Soe 27'

Indoor Stadium Huamark, Bangkok
Attendance: 50
Referee: Hussain Ali Albahhar (Bahrain)
4 April 2022
13:00

Timor-Leste	4–7	Australia
Fernandes 5'; Ximenes 8'; Mesquita 13'; Sweedan 20' (o.g.)	Report (AFF)	Fornito 4'; Adeli 10', 29'; Rathjen 18'; Rogan 24', 35'; Guerreiro 25'

Indoor Stadium Huamark, Bangkok
Attendance: 50
Referee: Abdulrahman Ali Aldoseri (Bahrain)

5 April 2022
11:00

Australia	1–6	Myanmar
Haddad 10'	Report (AFF)	Thyne Phwet Aung 4', 32'; Aung Zin Oo 16'; Hein Min Soe 24'; Nyein Min Soe 25'; Niski 27' (o.g.)

Indoor Stadium Huamark, Bangkok
Attendance: 20
Referee: Wahyu Wicaksono (Indonesia)
5 April 2022
13:00

Timor-Leste	1–7	Vietnam
Cesario 17'	Report (AFF)	Nguyễn Thịnh Phát 1', 20'; Trần Thái Huy 19'; Lê Quốc Nam 23'; Nguyễn Văn Hiếu 23', 28'; Nguyễn Minh Trí 30'

Indoor Stadium Huamark, Bangkok
Attendance: 50
Referee: Ali Hafizi (Iran)

6 April 2022
11:00

Vietnam	5–1	Australia
Nguyễn Thịnh Phát 13', 34'; Trần Thái Huy 20'; Châu Đoàn Phát 35'; Nhan Gia Hưng 38'	Report (AFF)	Fornito 27' (pen.)

Indoor Stadium Huamark, Bangkok
Attendance: 25
Referee: Hussain Ali Albahhar (Bahrain)
6 April 2022
13:00

Myanmar	10–3	Timor-Leste
Lin Tun Kyaw 7'; Hlaing Min Tun 8', 12', 14', 34'; Thyne Phwet Aung 9'; Myo Thet Aung 9', 13'; Myo Myint Soe 21'; Wai Zin Oo 27'	Report (AFF)	Guterres 13'; Mesquita 19'; Fernandes 23'

Indoor Stadium Huamark, Bangkok
Attendance: 50
Referee: Abdulaziz Alsarraf (Kuwait)

== Knockout stage ==
=== Bracket ===
Semi-finals
8 April – Bangkok
Myanmar	1
Indonesia	6
8 April – Bangkok
Thailand	3
Vietnam	1

Final
10 April – Bangkok
Indonesia	2 (3)
Thailand (p)	2 (5)
Third place
10 April – Bangkok
Myanmar	1 (1)
Vietnam (p)	1 (4)

=== Semi-finals ===
The winner will qualify for 2022 AFC Futsal Asian Cup.

8 April 2022
14:30

Myanmar	1–6	Indonesia
Hlaing Min Tun 37'	Report (AFF)	Syauqi 17'; Soumilena 23'; Runtuboy 25', 35'; Guntur 40'; Firman 40'

Indoor Stadium Huamark, Bangkok
Attendance: 250
Referee: Ali Hafizi (Iran)
8 April 2022
17:00

Thailand	3–1	Vietnam
Osamanmusa 21', 36'; Kritsada 40'	Report (AFF)	Nguyễn Minh Trí 32'

Indoor Stadium Huamark, Bangkok
Attendance: 800
Referee: Fahad Alhosani (United Arab Emirates)

=== Third place match ===
The winner will qualify for 2022 AFC Futsal Asian Cup.

10 April 2022
14:30

Myanmar	1–1	Vietnam
Khin Zaw Lin 40'	Report (AFF)	Nguyễn Thịnh Phát 29'
Penalties
Myo Myint Soe (penalty missed); Aung Zin Oo (penalty missed); Nyein Min Soe (penalty scored)	1–4	(penalty scored) Trần Văn Vũ; (penalty scored) Phạm Đức Hoà; (penalty scored) Khổng Đình Hùng; (penalty scored) Nguyễn Minh Trí

Indoor Stadium Huamark, Bangkok
Attendance: 1000
Referee: Fahad Alhosani (United Arab Emirates)

=== Final ===
10 April 2022
17:00

Indonesia	2–2	Thailand
Soumilena 8'; Runtuboy 25'	Report (AFF)	Rahbar 39'; salman 40'
Penalties
Firman Adriansyah (penalty scored); Ardiansyah Runtuboy (penalty missed); Syauqi Saud (penalty scored); Ardiansyah Nur (penalty scored)	3–5	(penalty scored) Muhammad Salman; (penalty scored) Rahbar Khan; (penalty scored) Hasan Rifat; (penalty scored) Mitul Barman; (penalty scored) Ibnul Kaderi

Indoor Stadium Huamark, Bangkok
Referee: Abdulrahman Ali Aldoseri (Bahrain)

== Winners ==
2022 ASEAN Futsal Championship winners

Thailand
16th title

== Goalscorers ==
There were 161 goals scored in 20 matches, for an average of 8.05 goals per match.

11 goals

- (Thailand) Muhammad Osamanmusa

9 goals

- (Indonesia) Ardiansyah Runtuboy

8 goals

- (Indonesia) Evan Soumilena

6 goals

- (Indonesia) Syauqi Saud
- (Thailand) Kritsada Wongkaeo

5 goals

- (Myanmar) Hlaing Min Tun
- (Thailand) Peerapat Kaewwilai
- (Vietnam) Nguyễn Thịnh Phát

4 goals

- (Indonesia) Ardiansyah Nur

3 goals

- (Cambodia) Tong Chanmony
- (Malaysia) Abu Haniffa Hasan
- (Malaysia) Muhammad Farhan Anuar
- (Myanmar) Thyne Phwet Aung
- (Thailand) Krit Aransanyalak
- (Thailand) Panat Kittipanuwong
- (Thailand) Ronnachai Jungwongsuk

2 goals

- (Australia) Nicholas Rathjen
- (Australia) Scott Rogan
- (Australia) Shervin Adeli
- (Cambodia) Orkchan Sereyvong
- (Indonesia) Dewa Rizki
- (Indonesia) Firman Ardiansyah
- (Malaysia) Khairul Effendy
- (Malaysia) Joshua Lee
- (Malaysia) Mohamad Shufri Shamil
- (Malaysia) Muhammad Ekmal Shahrin
- (Myanmar) Myo Myint Soe
- (Thailand) Apiwat Chaemcharoen
- (Timor-Leste) Joaquim Mesquita
- (Timor-Leste) Miguel Fernandes
- (Vietnam) Nguyễn Minh Trí
- (Vietnam) Nguyễn Văn Hiếu
- (Vietnam) Nhan Gia Hưng
- (Vietnam) Trần Thái Huy

1 goal

- (Australia) Anthony Haddad
- (Australia) Daniel Fornito
- (Australia) Jordan Guerreiro
- (Cambodia) Ros Sichamroeun
- (Cambodia) Prum Diamant
- (Cambodia) Lun Sothydaroth
- (Indonesia) Marvin Alexa
- (Indonesia) Mochammad Iqbal Iskandar
- (Indonesia) Rio Pangestu
- (Indonesia) Sunny Rizky
- (Malaysia) Muhammad Aidil Rosli
- (Malaysia) Ridzwan Bakri
- (Malaysia) Saiful Nizam
- (Myanmar) Aung Zin Oo
- (Myanmar) Hein Min Soe
- (Myanmar) Khin Zaw Lin
- (Myanmar) Lin Tun Kyaw
- (Myanmar) Myo Thet Aung
- (Myanmar) Nyein Min Soe
- (Myanmar) Wai Zin Oo
- (Thailand) Atsadawut Jangkot
- (Thailand) Supakorn Bowornratchadakul
- (Timor-Leste) Bendito Ximenes
- (Timor-Leste) Cesario Silvano
- (Timor-Leste) Venceslau Guterres
- (Vietnam) Châu Đoàn Phát
- (Vietnam) Lê Quốc Nam

1 own goal

- (Australia) Ahmed Sweedan (against Timor Leste)
- (Australia) Dylan Niski (against Myanmar)
- (Brunei) Shahrezan Metali (against Indonesia)
- (Brunei) Abdul Khaliq (against Thailand)
- (Brunei) Aiman Amin (against Thailand)
- (Cambodia) Prum Diamant (against Indonesia)
- (Cambodia) Duk Sophat (against Thailand)

2 own goals

- (Brunei) Khalil Saab (against Indonesia and Cambodia)
- (Cambodia) Ros Sichamroeun (against Malaysia)

== Qualified teams ==
The following teams qualified for 2022 AFC Futsal Asian Cup.

Team	Qualified as	Qualified on	Previous best performance in AFC Futsal Asian Cup
Thailand	2022 AFF Futsal Championship winners	8 April 2022	Runners-up (2008, 2012)
Indonesia	2022 AFF Futsal Championship runners-up	8 April 2022	Group stage (2002, 2003, 2004, 2005, 2006, 2008, 2010, 2012, 2014)
Vietnam	2022 AFF Futsal Championship third place	10 April 2022	Fourth place (2016)

=== Tournament teams ranking ===
This table will show the ranking of teams throughout the tournament.

Pos	Team	Pld	W	D	L	GF	GA	GD	Pts	Final result
1	Thailand	6	4	2	0	40	7	+33	14	Champion
2	Indonesia	6	4	2	0	38	8	+30	14	Runner-up
3	Vietnam	5	2	2	1	15	7	+8	8	Third Place
4	Myanmar	5	2	2	1	19	12	+7	8	Fourth Place
5	Malaysia	4	2	0	2	20	15	+5	6	Eliminated in group stage
6	Australia	3	1	0	2	9	15	−6	3	Eliminated in group stage
7	Cambodia	4	0	1	3	10	36	−26	1	Eliminated in group stage
8	Brunei	4	0	1	3	2	37	−35	1	Eliminated in group stage
9	Timor-Leste	3	0	0	3	8	24	−16	0	Eliminated in group stage

Source: AFF

== Broadcasting rights ==
Country/Region	Broadcaster
ASEAN	Facebook page : Futsal Thailand - ฟุตซอล ไทยแลนด์
Cambodia	Hang Meas HDTV
Indonesia	MNC Sports, RCTI, INews
Malaysia	Astro Arena
Thailand	9 MCOT HD, T Sport 7
Vietnam	On Sports TV
Australia	My Football
