= 2019 AFF Futsal Championship =

Tournament details
- Host country: Vietnam
- City: Ho Chi Minh City
- Dates: 21–27 October
- Teams: 8 (from 1 sub-confederation)
- Venue: 1 (in 1 host city)

Final positions
- Champions: Thailand (15th title)
- Runners-up: Indonesia
- Third place: Vietnam
- Fourth place: Myanmar

Tournament statistics
- Matches played: 16
- Goals scored: 123 (7.69 per match)
- Attendance: 11,718 (732 per match)
- Top scorer(s): (Thailand) Muhammad Osamanmusa (7 goals)
- Fair play award: Vietnam

The 2019 AFF Futsal Championship was the 16th edition of the tournament. The tournament was held in Ho Chi Minh City, Vietnam.

Same as the previous tournament which were held in odd years, the tournament serves as AFC Futsal Championship qualification. Top 3 teams of the tournament will qualify for 2020 AFC Futsal Championship in Turkmenistan as AFF's representative.

== Entrants ==
There was no qualification, and all entrants advanced to the final tournament. The following 8 teams from member associations of the ASEAN Football Federation entered the tournament. Australia came back for this tournament after 4 years of absence since their last appearance in 2015 AFF Futsal Championship.

Team	Association	Appearance	Previous best performance
Thailand	FA Thailand	15th	Winners (2001, 2003, 2005, 2006, 2007, 2008, 2009, 2012, 2013, 2014, 2015, 2016, 2017, 2018)
Indonesia	FA Indonesia	14th	Winners (2010)
Malaysia	FA Malaysia	16th	Runners-up (2003, 2005, 2010, 2017, 2018)
Australia	FF Australia	5th	Runners-up (2007, 2013, 2014, 2015)
Vietnam	Vietnam FF	13th	Runners-up (2009, 2012)
Myanmar	Myanmar FF	13th	Runners-up (2016)
Cambodia	FF Cambodia	5th	Fourth place (2003, 2006)
Timor-Leste	FF Timor-Leste	9th	Fourth place (2016)

== Venue ==
All matches are held in Phú Thọ Indoor Stadium, Ho Chi Minh City.

Ho Chi Minh City
Phú Thọ Indoor Stadium
Capacity: 3,500
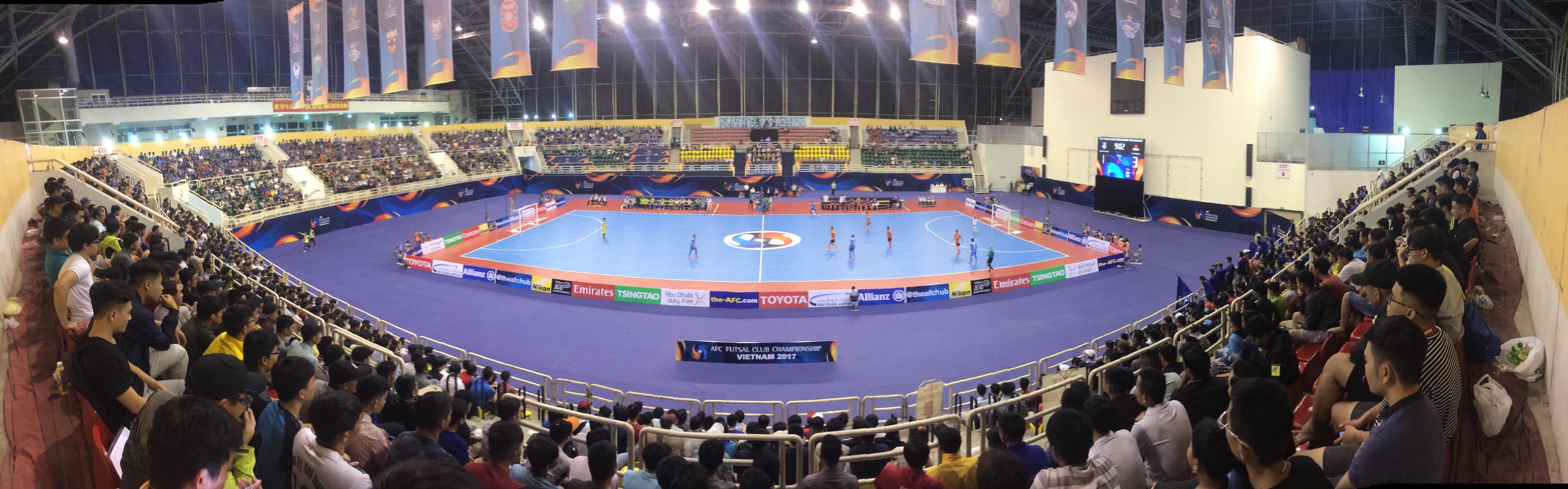

== Group stage ==
All times are local time: UTC+7.

=== Group A ===
Pos	Team	Pld	W	D	L	GF	GA	GD	Pts	Qualification
1	Thailand	3	3	0	0	33	1	+32	9	Knockout stage
2	Myanmar	3	2	0	1	19	13	+6	6	Knockout stage
3	Timor-Leste	3	0	1	2	6	22	−16	1	
4	Cambodia	3	0	1	2	7	29	−22	1	

Source: AFF AFC
21 October 2019
11:00

Thailand	12–0	Cambodia
Ronnachai 12', 33'; Osamanmusa 13', 21', 21'; Kritsada 30', 31'; Pornmongkol 33', 37', 40'; Jetsada 36'; Watchara 39'	Report (AFC); Report (AFF)

Phú Thọ Indoor Stadium, Ho Chi Minh City
Attendance: 120
Referee: Hawkar Ahmed (Iraq)
21 October 2019
13:30

Myanmar	6–1	Timor-Leste
Khin Zaw Lin 1'; Hlaing Min Tun 20'; Nyein Min Soe 33', 35'; Pyae Phyo Maung (2) 36'; Kaung Chit Thu 40'	Report (AFC); Report (AFF)	Duarte 13'

Phú Thọ Indoor Stadium, Ho Chi Minh City
Attendance: 82
Referee: Lee Po-fu (Chinese Taipei)

22 October 2019
11:30

Cambodia	3–13	Myanmar
Cheatuo 1', 29'; Sereyvong 30'	Report (AFC); Report (AFF)	Nyein Min Soe 6'; Aung Zin Oo 8', 27', 28'; Pyae Phyo Maung 13', 14'; Ko Ko Lwin 13', 24'; Hlaing Min Tun 21', 40'; Naing Ye Kyaw 26'; Wai Zin Oo 27'; Pyae Phyo Maung 29'

Phú Thọ Indoor Stadium, Ho Chi Minh City
Attendance: 68
Referee: Abdulrahman Ali Aldoseri (Bahrain)
22 October 2019
14:00

Timor-Leste	1–12	Thailand
Nunes 14'	Report (AFC); Report (AFF)	Suphawut 6', 18' (pen.); E. Soares 6' (o.g.); Apiwat 8'; Ronnachai 8', 28'; Jetsada 10'; Nattawut 17'; Osamanmusa 20', 30', 40' (pen.); Watchara 22'

Phú Thọ Indoor Stadium, Ho Chi Minh City
Attendance: 100
Referee: Tsubasa Oya (Japan)

23 October 2019
11:30

Thailand	9–0	Myanmar
Warut 16', 25'; Jirawat 21'; Suphawut 23'; Jetsada 27'; Kritsada 32'; Nattawut 34'; Pornmongkol 39'; Watchara 40'	Report (AFC); Report (AFF)

Phú Thọ Indoor Stadium, Ho Chi Minh City
Attendance: 112
Referee: Mohammad Tamim Hussaini (Afghanistan)
23 October 2019
14:00

Timor-Leste	4–4	Cambodia
Moniz 9', 30'; Ximenes 19'; E. Soares 32'	Report (AFC); Report (AFF)	Duarte 1' (o.g.); Sirotha 2'; Sokly 7'; Sereyvong 22'

Phú Thọ Indoor Stadium, Ho Chi Minh City
Attendance: 145
Referee: Eisa Abdulhoussain (Kuwait)

=== Group B ===
Pos	Team	Pld	W	D	L	GF	GA	GD	Pts	Qualification
1	Indonesia	3	2	1	0	11	5	+6	7	Knockout stage
2	Vietnam (H)	3	2	1	0	6	2	+4	7	Knockout stage
3	Australia	3	1	0	2	9	14	−5	3	
4	Malaysia	3	0	0	3	8	13	−5	0	

Updated to match(es) played on 22 October 2019. Source: AFF AFC
(H) Hosts
21 October 2019
16:00

Malaysia	2–3	Indonesia
Ridzwan 27'; Nizam 27'	Report (AFC); Report (AFF)	Andri 17'; Iqbal 17'; Syahidansyah 32'

Phú Thọ Indoor Stadium, Ho Chi Minh City
Attendance: 160
Referee: Fahad Badir Alhosaini (United Arab Emirates)
21 October 2019
19:00

Vietnam	2–0	Australia
Nguyễn Mạnh Dũng 28'; Nguyễn Minh Trí 37'	Report (AFC); Report (AFF)

Phú Thọ Indoor Stadium, Ho Chi Minh City
Attendance: 2,122
Referee: Takeshi Fujita (Japan)

22 October 2019
16:30

Indonesia	0–0	Vietnam
	Report (AFC); Report (AFF)

Phú Thọ Indoor Stadium, Ho Chi Minh City
Attendance: 2,035
Referee: Ebrahim Mehrabiafshar (Iran)
22 October 2019
19:00

Australia	6–4	Malaysia
Lynch 1', 14'; W. Giovenali 3'; Cooper 6'; Niski 18'; Basger 38'	Report (AFC); Report (AFF)	G. Giovenali 20' (o.g.); Ridzwan 29', 34', 38'

Phú Thọ Indoor Stadium, Ho Chi Minh City
Attendance: 145
Referee: Khalil Balhawan (Lebanon)

23 October 2019
16:30

Indonesia	8–3	Australia
Ardiansyah N. 4'; Andri 17', 22'; Subhan 25', 34'; Bambang 33'; Iqbal 39', 40'	Report (AFC); Report (AFF)	Basger 14'; Fogarty 29', 33'

Phú Thọ Indoor Stadium, Ho Chi Minh City
Attendance: 562
Referee: Timur Ramazanov (Turkmenistan)
23 October 2019
19:00

Vietnam	4–2	Malaysia
Nguyễn Thành Tín 6'; Vũ Đức Tùng 24'; Nguyễn Minh Trí 39'; Châu Đoàn Phát 40'	Report (AFC); Report (AFF)	Haniffa 33'; Azwann 37'

Phú Thọ Indoor Stadium, Ho Chi Minh City
Attendance: 1,800
Referee: Takeshi Fujita (Japan)

== Knockout stage ==
=== Bracket ===
Semi-finals
25 October – Ho Chi Minh City
Thailand	2
Vietnam	0
25 October – Ho Chi Minh City
Indonesia	4
Myanmar	3

Final
27 October – Ho Chi Minh City
Thailand	5
Indonesia	0
Third place
27 October – Ho Chi Minh City
Vietnam	7
Myanmar	3

=== Semi-finals ===
The winners will qualify for 2020 AFC Futsal Championship.

25 October 2019
14:00

Thailand	2–0	Vietnam
Ronnachai 26'; Kritsada 26'	Report (AFC); Report (AFF)

Phú Thọ Indoor Stadium, Ho Chi Minh City
Attendance: 1,692
Referee: Lee Po-fu (Chinese Taipei)
25 October 2019
17:00

Indonesia	4–3	Myanmar
Firman 17'; Andri 28'; Subhan 32'; Marvin 40'	Report (AFC); Report (AFF)	Naing Ye Kyaw 23'; Nyein Min Soe 35'; Pyae Phyo Maung 40'

Phú Thọ Indoor Stadium, Ho Chi Minh City
Attendance: 384
Referee: Takeshi Fujita (Japan)

=== Third place match ===
The winner will qualify for 2020 AFC Futsal Championship.

27 October 2019
14:00

Vietnam	7–3	Myanmar
Trần Thái Huy 6', 6'; Nhan Gia Hưng 27'; Trần Văn Vũ 32', 38'; Phạm Đức Hòa 34'; Nguyễn Minh Trí 39'	Report (AFC); Report (AFF)	Naing Ye Kyaw 9', 33'; Kyaw Soe Moe 16'

Phú Thọ Indoor Stadium, Ho Chi Minh City
Attendance: 1,655
Referee: Hawkar Ahmed (Iraq)

=== Final ===
27 October 2019
17:00

Thailand	5–0	Indonesia
Osamanmusa 10'; Suphawut 17' (pen.); Warut 24'; Kritsada 35', 40'	Report (AFC); Report (AFF)

Phú Thọ Indoor Stadium, Ho Chi Minh City
Attendance: 536
Referee: Ebrahim Mehrabiafshar (Iran)

== Winners ==
2019 ASEAN Futsal Championship winners

Thailand
15th title

== Qualified teams ==
The following teams qualified for 2020 AFC Futsal Championship.

Team	Qualified as	Qualified on	Previous best performance in AFC Futsal Championship
Thailand	2019 AFF Futsal Championship winners	25 October 2019	Runners-up (2008, 2012)
Indonesia	2019 AFF Futsal Championship runners-up	25 October 2019	Group stage (2002, 2003, 2004, 2005, 2006, 2008, 2010, 2012, 2014)
Vietnam	2019 AFF Futsal Championship third place	27 October 2019	Fourth place (2016)

== Goalscorers ==
7 goals

- (Thailand) Muhammad Osamanmusa

6 goals

- (Thailand) Kritsada Wongkaeo

5 goals

- (Thailand) Ronnachai Jungwongsuk

4 goals

- (Indonesia) Andri Kustiawan
- (Malaysia) Ridzwan Bakri
- (Myanmar) Naing Ye Kyaw
- (Myanmar) Nyein Min Soe
- (Thailand) Pornmongkol Srisubseang
- (Thailand) Suphawut Thueanklang

3 goals

- (Indonesia) Iqbal Rahmattulah
- (Indonesia) Subhan Faidasa
- (Myanmar) Aung Zin Oo
- (Myanmar) Hlaing Min Tun
- (Myanmar) Pyae Phyo Maung
- (Thailand) Jetsada Chudech
- (Thailand) Warut Wangsama-aeo
- (Thailand) Watchara Laisri
- (Vietnam) Nguyễn Minh Trí

2 goals

- (Australia) Jarrod Basger
- (Australia) Daniel Fogarty
- (Australia) Grant Lynch
- (Cambodia) Keo Cheatuo
- (Cambodia) Orkchan Sereyvong
- (Myanmar) Ko Ko Lwin
- (Myanmar) Pyae Phyo Maung
- (Thailand) Nattawut Madyalan
- (Timor-Leste) Mario Moniz
- (Vietnam) Trần Thái Huy
- (Vietnam) Trần Văn Vũ

1 goal

- (Australia) Adam Cooper
- (Australia) Wade Giovenali
- (Australia) Nathan Niski
- (Cambodia) Heng Sokly
- (Cambodia) Ros Sirotha
- (Indonesia) Ardiansyah Nur
- (Indonesia) Bambang Saptaji
- (Indonesia) Firman Ardiansyah
- (Indonesia) Marvin Wossiry
- (Indonesia) Syahidansyah Lubis
- (Malaysia) Abu Haniffa Hasan
- (Malaysia) Azwann Ismail
- (Malaysia) Saiful Nizam Ali
- (Myanmar) Kaung Chit Thu
- (Myanmar) Khin Zaw Lin
- (Myanmar) Kyaw Soe Moe
- (Myanmar) Wai Zin Oo
- (Thailand) Apiwat Chaemcharoen
- (Thailand) Jirawat Sornwichian
- (Timor-Leste) Remigio Duarte
- (Timor-Leste) Ilidio Nunes
- (Timor-Leste) Eufrasio Soares
- (Timor-Leste) Bendito Ximenes
- (Vietnam) Châu Đoàn Phát
- (Vietnam) Nguyễn Mạnh Dũng
- (Vietnam) Nguyễn Thành Tín
- (Vietnam) Nhan Gia Hưng
- (Vietnam) Phạm Đức Hòa
- (Vietnam) Vũ Đức Tùng

1 own goal

- (Australia) Gregory Giovenali (against Malaysia)
- (Timor-Leste) Remigio Duarte (against Cambodia)
- (Timor-Leste) Eufrasio Soares (against Thailand)
