= Justinus Lhaksana =

Indonesian futsal coach and sports commentator

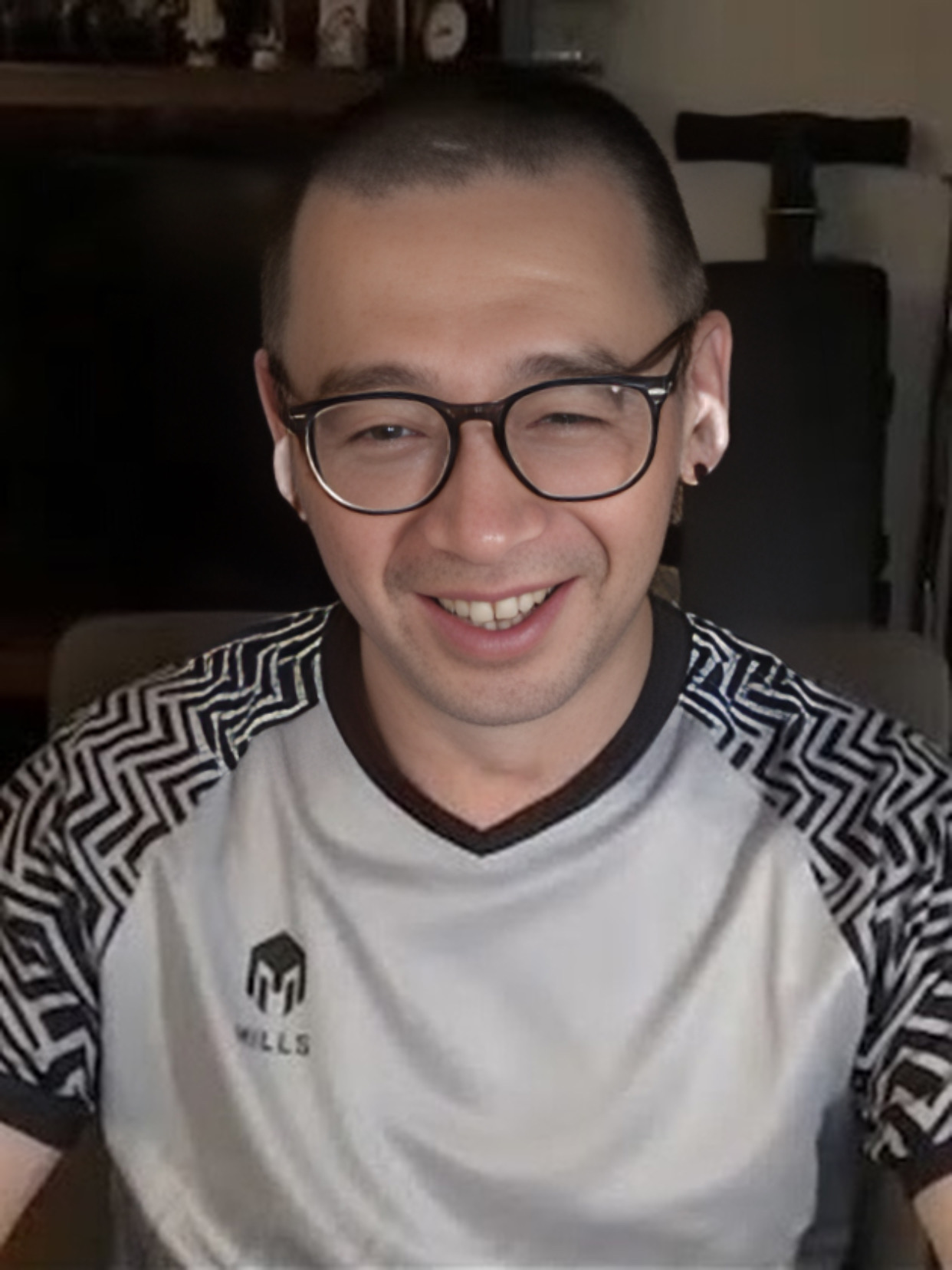
- Justinus Lhaksana in 2021
- Born: Justinus Lhaksana; 28 July 1967 (age 59); Surabaya, Indonesia
- Other names: Coach Justin; Kochi
- Education: VU University Amsterdam
- Occupations: Futsal coach; commentator; internet personality
- Years active: 2003–2019 (coaching); 2007–present (commentator)
- Height: 1.75 m (5 ft 9 in)
- Spouse: A. M. Dewi Larasati

YouTube information
- Channel: Justinus Lhaksana
- Years active: 2018–present
- Genre: Sports Podcast
- Subscribers: 1.02 million
- Views: 227 million
- Last updated: June 6, 2025
Association football career
Managerial career
- Years: Team
- 2003–2004: Adjie Massaid Futsal Clinic
- 2004–2009: Indonesia futsal
- 2009–2013: Indonesia futsal (technical director)
- 2013: Indonesia futsal
- 2019: Indonesia futsal (technical director)

Justinus Lhaksana (born 28 July 1967), commonly referred to as Coach Justin, is an Indonesian former futsal coach and sports commentator in the field of football. He also often discusses football and analyzes the strategies of each club.

== Early life and education ==
Justinus Lhaksana was born on 28 July 1967 to an upper-class family in Surabaya, East Java. Both of his parents was born in Samarinda, East Kalimantan. His father is the son of a former KNIL soldier, and he works in the shipping sector, while his mother is of Chinese descent and owns a salon. In 1979, Justin alongside his parents moved to Utrecht, Netherlands. Due to their discomfort living in Surabaya during the Indonesian New Order period, which was marked by ethnic tensions and prevalent discrimination against individuals of Chinese descent.

Upon graduating from high school in Utrecht, Justin pursued a degree in political science at the Vrije Universiteit Amsterdam, with a specialization in political communication. While pursuing his studies, he worked part-time as a waiter at a restaurant in Amsterdam.

== Coaching career ==
In 1999, following the fall of Suharto, Justin returned to Indonesia. He started his coaching career in 2003 when he handled the Adjie Massaid Futsal Clinic (AMFC) futsal club. A year later, Justin flew back to the Netherlands to take a coaching course so that he managed to get a License from the Royal Dutch Football Association (KNVB).

After obtaining the license, Justin was appointed to handle the Indonesia national futsal team in 2004.

During his time as the national futsal team coach, Justin managed to bring Indonesia to the AFC Futsal Championship in 2005 and 2006. Subsequently, Justin also led Indonesia to achieve the runner-up position in the AFF Futsal Championship in both 2006 and 2008, and securing the third place in 2005 and 2009.

== Media career ==
In 2007, Justin, who was then serving as the head coach of the Indonesia national futsal team, made his television debut as a football commentator on Lativi for the Dutch professional football league, Eredivisie. He remained with the television station, which later rebranded to tvOne in 2008, until 2014, coinciding with the FIFA World Cup. After leaving tvOne, Justin transitioned to NET., where he was involved in the ESPN FC program from 2014 to 2018.

Subsequently, Justin became a commentator for the Premier League on beIN SPORTS from 2018 to 2020. In the same year, he also provided commentary for the Premier League on TVRI, although his tenure there was brief, concluding in 2020 due to the program's discontinuation.

In 2021, Justin participated as a commentator for UEFA Euro 2020 on RCTI, marking his final role as a television commentator. Currently, he is more actively engaged as a football pundit on his personal YouTube channel and collaborates with other presenters and media figures, such as Helmy Yahya and Panji Suryono. Additionally, he has established his own podcast business named Justalk Media which features several channels, including Jeroan Hukum and Lembaga Ngoceh Film (LNF).

== Personal life ==
Growing up in the Netherlands shaped his character in a way that often set him apart from the typical Indonesian society, leading to various controversies, particularly during the UEFA Euro 2020 event in 2021. His forthright and direct personality frequently places him in the spotlight.

Before pursuing his studies and subsequently becoming a futsal coach, Justin aspired to become a police officer. He is married, has a daughter and lives in Jakarta.

During his time in Utrecht, Justin developed an interest in FC Utrecht and has described himself as a supporter of the club. He has also expressed admiration for Arsenal and FC Barcelona.

== Honours ==
=== Manager ===
Indonesia

- AFF Futsal Championship runners-up: 2006, 2008; third place: 2005, 2009
