= Futsal at the 2021 SEA Games =

Tournament details
- Host country: Vietnam
- Dates: 10–20 May 2022
- Teams: 5 (men's); 4 (women's)
- Venue(s): 1 (in 1 host city)

The futsal tournament at the 2021 SEA Games is scheduled to be held from 10 to 20 May 2022 in Vietnam. All matches will be held at Hà Nam Gymnasium in Phủ Lý. Hà Nam Province.

== Venue ==
Futsal at the 2021 SEA Games (Vietnam)	Hà Nam
Futsal at the 2021 SEA Games (Vietnam)	Hà Nam Gymnasium
Futsal at the 2021 SEA Games (Vietnam)	Capacity: 7,500

== Participating nations ==
Nation	Men's	Women's
Indonesia	Yes	No
Malaysia	Yes	Yes
Myanmar	Yes	Yes
Thailand	Yes	Yes
Vietnam	Yes	Yes
Total: 5 NOCs	5	4

== Draw ==
No group draw was held for futsal as there are only 5 teams in both tournament, so all teams are automatically drawn to one group. Instead, teams are only drawn for scheduling purposes.

== Competition format ==
- Both tournaments will be held in Round robin format; the team with the best record wins the gold medal.

== Medal summary ==
=== Medal table ===
Host nation

Rank	Nation	Gold	Silver	Bronze	Total
1	Thailand (THA)	2	0	0	2
2	Vietnam (VIE)*	0	1	1	2
3	Indonesia (INA)	0	1	0	1
4	Malaysia (MAS)	0	0	1	1
5	Myanmar (MYA)	0	0	0	0
Totals (5 entries)		2	2	2	6

=== Medalists ===
Event	Gold	Silver	Bronze
Men's tournament	Thailand (THA); Katawut Hankampa; Panurat Olan; Ronnachai Jungwongsuk; Chaowala Sriarwut; Kritsada Wongkaeo; Krit Aransanyalak; Apiwat Chaemcharoen; Supakorn Bowonratchadakul; Panat Kittipanuwong; Tanapol Maneepetch; Peerapat Kaewwilai; Atsadawut Jangkot; Sarawut Phalaphruek; Muhammad Osamanmusa	Indonesia (INA); Evan Soumilena; Ardiansyah Runtuboy; Ardiansyah Nur; Firman Adriansyah; Muhammad Rizki Xavier; Muhammad Iqbal Iskandar; Dewa Rizki Amanda; Rio Pangestu Putra; Muhammad Al-Bagir; Marvin Alexa Wossiry; Syauqi Saud; Guntur Sulistyo Ariwibowo; Muhammad Nizar Nayaruddin	Vietnam (VIE); Hồ Văn Ý Trần Thái Huy; Nguyễn Anh Duy; Nguyễn Thịnh Phát; Từ Minh Quang; Lê Quốc Nam; Nguyễn Văn Hiếu; Châu Đoàn Phát; Nguyễn Mạnh Dũng; Nhan Gia Hưng; Trần Văn Vũ; Nguyễn Minh Trí; Mai Xuân Hiệp; Phạm Đức Hòa
Women's tournament	Thailand (THA); Sasiprapha Suksen; Pannipa Kamolrat; Darika Peanpailun; Mutita Senkram; Jenjira Bubpha; Pacharaporn Srimuang; Sangrawee Meekham; Paerploy Huajaipetch; Patitta Moolpho; Jiraprapa Nimrattanasing; Nattamon Artkla; Hataichanok Tappakun; Jiraprapa Tupsuri; Sasicha Phothiwong	Vietnam (VIE); Ngô Nguyễn Thùy Linh; Trần Thị Hải Yến; Trịnh Nguyễn Thanh Hằng; Trịnh Ngọc Hoa; Lê Thị Thanh Ngân; Đinh Thị Ngọc Hân; Nguyễn Thị Châu; Biện Thị Hằng; Bùi Thúy An; Bùi Thị Trang; Nguyễn Thị Vân Anh; Lê Thị Thùy Trang; Đỗ Thị Nguyên; Lê Thu Thanh Hương	Malaysia (MAS); Sity Norazizah Jamal; Noorasyeimah Mohamad Rashid; Shereilynn Elly Pius; Haindee Mosroh; Masturah Majid; Usliza Usman; Nur Syafiqah Zainal Abidin; Hanis Farhana Shamsul Azizan; Norhawa Md Yasin; Fatin Shahida Azmi; Nur Shazreen Munazli; Siti Asnidah Zamri; Intan Sarah; Nur Lyana Soberi; Nur Ainsyah Murad; Hanani Adriana Shamsul Azizan

== See also ==
- Football at the 2021 SEA Games
- 2021 Southeast Asian Games
