= Kritsada Wongkaeo =

Thai football player

Kritsada Wongkaew
Personal information
- Full name: Kritsada Wongkaew
- Date of birth: 29 April 1988 (age 38)
- Place of birth: Ratchaburi, Thailand
- Height: 1.70 m (5 ft 7 in)
- Position: Midfielder

Team information
- Current team: Chonburi Bluewave
- Number: 7

Youth career
- 2001–2003: Wat Banpong School
- 2004–2006: Photha Wattana Senee School

Senior career*
Years	Team	Apps	(Gls)
2007–	Chonburi Bluewave	228	(251)
2018	→ Black Steel (loan)	8	(6)
2023–2024	→ Nakhon Pathom United (loan)	24	(1)

International career^{‡}
2009–	Thailand Futsal	76	(95)
Medal record
Thailand national futsal team
Sea Games
Gold medal – first place	2011 Southeast Asian Games	Futsal
AFF Futsal Championship
Winner	AFF Futsal Championship 2008	Futsal
Winner	AFF Futsal Championship 2009	Futsal
Winner	AFF Futsal Championship 2012	Futsal
Winner	AFF Futsal Championship 2016	Futsal
Winner	AFF Futsal Championship 2018	Futsal
Winner	AFF Futsal Championship 2019	Futsal
Winner	AFF Futsal Championship 2022	Futsal
Asian Indoor Games
Silver medal – second place	Asian Indoor Games 2009	Futsal
Asian Championship
Runner-up	AFC Futsal Championship 2012	Futsal
- * Club domestic league appearances and goals ‡ National team caps and goals as of 14:59, 17 September 2024 (UTC)

Kritsada Wongkaew (Thai: กฤษดา วงษ์แก้ว), is a Thai professional futsal player who plays for Chonburi Bluewave and the Thailand national futsal team.

== Honour ==
Nakhon Pathom United

- Thai League 2: 2022–23
