= Ronnachai Jungwongsuk =

Thai futsal player (born 1997)

Personal information
- Full name: Ronnachai Jungwongsuk
- Date of birth: 4 March 1997 (age 29)
- Place of birth: Bangkok, Thailand
- Height: 1.85 m (6 ft 1 in)
- Position: Defender

Team information
- Current team: Chonburi Bluewave
- Number: 5

Youth career
- 2013-2015: Nakornnont Wittaya Sport 6 School

Senior career*
Years	Team	Apps	(Gls)
2016	Department of Highways		
2017	Wiang Ping Chiang Mai		
2018-2019	Bangkok City		
2020-	Chonburi Bluewave		

International career^{‡}
2017–	Thailand Futsal		
Medal record
Thailand national futsal team
Southeast Asian Games
Gold medal – first place	2017 Kuala Lumpur	Futsal
Gold medal – first place	Hanoi 2021	Futsal
AFF Futsal Championship
Gold medal – first place	2017 Ho Chi Minh City	Futsal
Gold medal – first place	2018 Yogyakarta	Futsal
Gold medal – first place	2019 Ho Chi Minh City	Futsal
Gold medal – first place	2022 Bangkok	Futsal
Asian Championship
Silver medal – second place	AFC Futsal Championship 2024	Futsal
- * Club domestic league appearances and goals ‡ National team caps and goals as of 9:00, 23 September 2021 (UTC)

Ronnachai Jungwongsuk (Thai: รณชัย จูงวงษ์สุข; born 4 March 1997) is a Thai futsal defender, and currently a member of Thailand national futsal team.

== Honours ==
Thailand

- AFC Futsal Asian Cup Runners-up: 2024
