= 2018 AFF Futsal Championship =

Kejuaraan Futsal AFF

Tournament details
- Host country: Indonesia
- City: Yogyakarta
- Dates: 5–11 November
- Teams: 8 (from 1 sub-confederation)
- Venue: 1 (in 1 host city)

Final positions
- Champions: Thailand (14th title)
- Runners-up: Malaysia
- Third place: Indonesia
- Fourth place: Vietnam

Tournament statistics
- Matches played: 16
- Goals scored: 124 (7.75 per match)
- Top scorer: (Thailand) Jetsada Chudech (10 goals)

The 2018 AFF Futsal Championship will be the 15th edition of the tournament. The tournament will be held in November 2018 in Yogyakarta, Indonesia

Cambodia participate in this tournament after being absent 6 years. The last edition they played before was in 2012.

Australia, Laos and Singapore did not join while Philippines withdrew after drawing.

== Qualified teams ==
There was no qualification, and all entrants advanced to the final tournament. The following 11 teams from member associations of the ASEAN Football Federation entered the tournament.

Team	Association	Appearance	Previous best performance
Thailand	FA Thailand	14th	Winners (2001, 2003, 2005, 2006, 2007, 2008, 2009, 2012, 2013, 2014, 2015, 2016, 2017)
Indonesia	FA Indonesia	13th	Winners (2010)
Malaysia	FA Malaysia	15th	Runner-up (2003, 2005, 2010, 2017)
Vietnam	Vietnam FF	12th	Runner-up (2009, 2012)
Myanmar	Myanmar FF	12th	Runners-up (2016)
Brunei	FA Brunei DS	13th	Fourth place (2001, 2005, 2008)
Cambodia	FF Cambodia	4th	Fourth place (2003, 2006)
Timor-Leste	FF Timor-Leste	8th	Fourth place (2016)

== Venue ==
All matches are held in Yogyakarta.

== Group stage ==
All matches are to be played in Indonesia. Times listed are UTC+7.

=== Group A ===
Pos	Team	Pld	W	D	L	GF	GA	GD	Pts	Qualification
1	Malaysia	3	3	0	0	20	7	+13	9	Semi-finals
2	Indonesia (H)	3	2	0	1	23	8	+15	6	Semi-finals
3	Myanmar	3	1	0	2	14	10	+4	3	
4	Cambodia	3	0	0	3	2	34	−32	0	
5	Philippines	0	0	0	0	0	0	0	0	Withdrew

Source: AFF
Rules for classification: Tiebreakers
(H) Hosts
5 November 2018
11:30

Malaysia	10–0	Cambodia
Khairul Effendy 3', 22', 35'; Awaluddin Nawi 14', 33'; Abu Haniffa 15'; Syed Aizad 15'; Saiful Nizam 22'; Azwann Ismail 32'; Azri Rahman 40'	Report

GOR UNY, Yogyakarta
Referee: Pornnarong Grairod (Thailand)
5 November 2018
14:00

Myanmar	1–5	Indonesia
Min Tun 9'	Report	Bambang Bayu 3', 18'; Andri Kustiawan 15', 23'; Marvin Alexa 17'

GOR UNY, Yogyakarta
Referee: Ghafar Muhammad Zabri (Malaysia)

6 November 2018
11:30

Cambodia	2–11	Myanmar
Kim Sokyuth 27'; Ros Rathanak 36'	Report	Phyo Maung (forward) 10', 20'; Lin Tun Kyaw 16', 24', 33'; Soe Moe 16'; Zin Oo 27'; Ye Kyaw 31'; Phyo Maung 37', 39'; Min Soe 40'

GOR UNY, Yogyakarta
Referee: Sukry Haji Matassim (Brunei)
6 November 2018
14:00

Indonesia	5–7	Malaysia
Andri Kustiawan 7'; Subhan Faidasa 8'; Syauqi Saud 13'; Ardiansyah 17'; AlFajri Zikri 22'	Report	Ridzwan Bakri 1', 28', 36'; Saiful Nizam 2'; Iqbal Rahmatullah 6' (o.g.); Awaluddin Nawi 18', 28'

GOR UNY, Yogyakarta
Referee: Benjapol Mucharoensap (Thailand)

7 November 2018
11:30

Malaysia	3–2	Myanmar
Awaluddin Nawi 9'; Abu Haniffa 19'; Azri Rahman 25'	Report	Azri Rahman 9' (o.g.); Phyo Maung (forward) 35'

GOR UNY, Yogyakarta
Referee: Saing Sopheak (Cambodia)
7 November 2018
14:00

Indonesia	13–0	Cambodia
AlFajri Zikri 3', 22'; Subhan Faidasa 13', 20'; Bambang Bayu 13'; Syauqi Saud 15', 19'; Ardiansyah 18'; Randy Satria 26'; Rio Pangestu 31'; Marvin Alexa 34'; Aditya Rasyid 39'; Fhandy Permana 40'	Report

GOR UNY, Yogyakarta
Referee: Pornnarong Grairod (Thailand)

=== Group B ===
Pos	Team	Pld	W	D	L	GF	GA	GD	Pts	Qualification
1	Thailand	3	3	0	0	35	1	+34	9	Semi-finals
2	Vietnam	3	2	0	1	18	5	+13	6	Semi-finals
3	Timor-Leste	3	1	0	2	3	23	−20	3	
4	Brunei	3	0	0	3	1	28	−27	0	

Source: AFF
Rules for classification: Tiebreakers
5 November 2018
16:30

Thailand	14–0	Timor-Leste
Sarawut Phalaphruek 9', 18', 19'; Suthiporn Kladcharoen 10'; Jetsada Chudech 14', 28', 39'; Muhammad Osamanmusa 25', 26', 36' (pen.); Pornmongkol Srisubseang 29', 31', 38'; Apiwat Chaemcharoen 39'	Report

GOR UNY, Yogyakarta
Referee: Thi Ly Hoang Ha (Vietnam)
5 November 2018
18:30

Vietnam	9–0	Brunei
Chu Van Tien 6'; Vu Quoc Hung 13'; Ton That Phi 14'; Nguyen Thanh Tin 14', 26', 34'; Nguyen Manh Dung 20'; Chau Duan Phat 28'; Tran Van Vu 35'	Report

GOR UNY, Yogyakarta
Referee: Wahyu Wicaksana (Indonesia)

6 November 2018
16:30

Brunei	0–17	Thailand
	Report	Nawin Rattanawongswas 1', 2', 12', 34'; Warut Wangsama-aeo 2', 14', 22'; Apiwat Chaemcharoen 4', 17'; Jetsada Chudech 5', 6', 15', 16'; Chaivat Jamgrajang 17'; Sarawat Phalaphruek 30'; Suthiporn Kladcharoen 31', 39'

GOR UNY, Yogyakarta
Referee: Saing Sopheak (Cambodia)
6 November 2018
18:30

Timor-Leste	1–8	Vietnam
Romula Escurial 4'	Report	Vu Quoc Hung 3'; Ton That Phi 5'; Nguyen Manh Dung 8'; Nguyen Thanh Tin 12'; Chu Van Tien 13', 21'; Dang Anh Tai 29', 39'

GOR UNY, Yogyakarta
Referee: Zin Myo Aung (Myanmar)

7 November 2018
16:30

Thailand	4–1	Vietnam
Jetsada Chudech 19', 34'; Ronnachai Jungwongsuk 22'; Kiatiyot Chalarmkhet 23'	Report	Tran Van Vu 14'

GOR UNY, Yogyakarta
Referee: Sukry Haji Matassim (Brunei)
7 November 2018
18:30

Brunei	1–2	Timor-Leste
Awangku Naqib 3'	Report	Bendito Ximenes 22'; Khalil Saab 36' (o.g.)

GOR UNY, Yogyakarta
Referee: Wahyu Wicaksana (Indonesia)

== Knockout stage ==
In the knockout stage, extra time and penalty shoot-out are used to decide the winner if necessary, excluding the third place match.

=== Bracket ===
Semi-finals
9 November – Yogyakarta
Malaysia (p)	2 (5)
Vietnam	2 (4)
9 November – Yogyakarta
Thailand (a.e.t.)	3
Indonesia	2

Final
11 November – Yogyakarta
Malaysia	2
Thailand	4
Third place
11 November – Yogyakarta
Vietnam	1
Indonesia	3

=== Semi-finals ===
9 November 2018
17:30

Malaysia	2–2	Vietnam
Azwann Ismail 5'; Azri Rahman 26'	Report	Vo Quoc Hung 30'; Nguyen Thanh Tin 40'
Penalties
Awaluddin Nawi (penalty scored); Harith Naim (penalty scored); Yazid Kamaruzuan (penalty scored); Syed Aizad (penalty scored); Shamar Fadzil (penalty missed); Abu Haniffa (penalty scored)	5–4	(penalty scored) Nguyen Thanh Tin; (penalty scored) Ton That Phi; (penalty scored) Tran Van Vu; (penalty scored) Chu Van Tien; (penalty missed) Ngo Ngoc Son; (penalty missed) Vu Duc Tung

GOR UNY, Yogyakarta
Referee: Pornnarong Grairod (Thailand)
9 November 2018
14:00

Thailand	3–2 (a.e.t.)	Indonesia
Apiwat Chaemcharoen 6', 12'; Kiatiyot Chalarmkhet 50'	Report	Andri Kustiawan 22'; Subhan Faidasa 40'

GOR UNY, Yogyakarta
Referee: Thi Ly Hoang Ha (Vietnam)

=== Third place match ===
11 November 2018
11:00

Vietnam	1–3	Indonesia
Đặng Anh Tài 4'	Report	Andri Kustiawan 17'; Subhan Faidasa 26'; Bambang Bayu 31'

GOR UNY, Yogyakarta
Referee: Benjapol Muchareonsap (Thailand)

=== Final ===
11 November 2018
14:00

Malaysia	2–4	Thailand
Awaluddin Nawi 11'; Khairul Effendy 34'	Report	Muhammad Osamanmusa 2'; Jetsada Chudech 16'; Apiwat Chaemcharoen 25'; Chaivat Jamgrajang 36'

GOR UNY, Yogyakarta
Referee: Thi Ly Hoang Ha (Vietnam)

== Winners ==
2018 ASEAN Futsal Championship winners

Thailand
14th title

== Goalscorers ==
10 goals

- (Thailand) Jetsada Chudech

5 goals

- (Malaysia) Awaluddin Nawi
- (Thailand) Apiwat Chaemcharoen
- (Vietnam) Nguyen Thanh Tin

4 goals

- (Indonesia) Andri Kustiawan
- (Indonesia) Subhan Faidasa
- (Thailand) Nawin Rattanawongswas
- (Thailand) Sarawut Phalaphruek

3 goals

- (Indonesia) AlFajri Zikri
- (Indonesia) Bambang Bayu
- (Indonesia) Syauqi Saud
- (Malaysia) Azri Rahman
- (Malaysia) Khairul Effendy
- (Malaysia) Ridzwan Bakri
- (Myanmar) Naing Lin Tun Kyaw
- (Myanmar) Phae Phyo Maung (forward)
- (Thailand) Muhammad Osamanmusa
- (Thailand) Pornmongkol Srisubseang
- (Thailand) Suthiporn Kladcharoen
- (Thailand) Warut Wangsama-aeo
- (Vietnam) Chu Van Tien
- (Vietnam) Vu Quoc Hung

2 goals

- (Indonesia) Ardiansyah
- (Indonesia) Marvin Alexa
- (Malaysia) Abu Haniffa
- (Malaysia) Azwann Ismail
- (Malaysia) Saiful Nizam
- (Thailand) Keattiyot Chalaemkhet
- (Myanmar) Phae Phyo Maung
- (Vietnam) Nguyen Manh Dung
- (Vietnam) Ton That Phi
- (Vietnam) Tran Van Vu

1 goal

- (Brunei) Awangku Muhammad Naqib
- (Cambodia) Kim Sokyuth
- (Cambodia) Ros Rattanak
- (Indonesia) Aditya Rasyid
- (Indonesia) Fhandy Permana
- (Indonesia) Randy Satria
- (Indonesia) Rio Pangestu
- (Malaysia) Syed Aizad
- (Myanmar) Aung Zin Oo
- (Myanmar) Hlaing Min Tun
- (Myanmar) Kyaw Soe Moe
- (Myanmar) Naing Ye Kyaw
- (Myanmar) Nyein Min Soe
- (Thailand) Chaivat Jamgrajang
- (Thailand) Ronnachai Jungwongsuk
- (Timor-Leste) Bendito Ximenes
- (Timor-Leste) Romula Escurial
- (Vietnam) Chau Duan Phat
- (Vietnam) Dang Anh Tai

1 own goal

- (Brunei) Khalil Saab (against Timor-Leste)
- (Indonesia) Iqbal Rahmatullah (against Malaysia)
- (Malaysia) Azri Rahman (against Myanmar)
