= Indonesia national futsal team =

Men's futsal team

Indonesia
- Nicknames: Tim Garuda (Garuda Team); Merah Putih (The Red and White)
- Association: PSSI through FFI
- Confederation: AFC (Asia)
- Sub-confederation: AFF (Southeast Asia)
- Head coach: Héctor Souto
- Captain: M. Iqbal Rahmattulah
- FIFA code: IDN
First colours	Second colours

FIFA ranking
- Current: 14 (24 September 2026)
- Highest: 14 (8 May 2026)
- Lowest: 28 (May–November 2024)

First international
- Indonesia 6–0 China (Jakarta, Indonesia; 22 October 2002)

Biggest win
- Indonesia 29–0 Cambodia (Kuantan, Malaysia; 6 July 2003)

Biggest defeat
- Indonesia 1–20 Iran (Tashkent, Uzbekistan; 22 May 2006); Indonesia 1–20 Argentina (Kuala Lumpur, Malaysia; 4 June 2003)

AFC Futsal Asian Cup
- Appearances: 10 (first in 2002)
- Best result: Runners-up (2026)

ASEAN Futsal Championship
- Appearances: 16 (first in 2003)
- Best result: Champions (2010, 2024)

Asian Indoor and Martial Arts Games
- Appearances: 2 (first in 2007)
- Best result: Group stage (2007, 2013)

SEA Games
- Appearances: 6 (first in 2007)
- Best result: Gold medal (2025)
Medal record
AFC Futsal Asian Cup
Silver medal – second place	2026 Jakarta	Team
ASEAN Futsal Championship
Gold medal – first place	2010 Ho Chi Minh City	Team
Gold medal – first place	2024 Nakhon Ratchasima	Team
Silver medal – second place	2006 Bangkok	Team
Silver medal – second place	2008 Bangkok	Team
Silver medal – second place	2019 Ho Chi Minh City	Team
Silver medal – second place	2022 Bangkok	Team
Silver medal – second place	2026 Nonthaburi	Team
Bronze medal – third place	2003 Kuantan	Team
Bronze medal – third place	2005 Bangkok	Team
Bronze medal – third place	2009 Ho Chi Minh City	Team
Bronze medal – third place	2012 Bangkok	Team
Bronze medal – third place	2018 Yogyakarta	Team
SEA Games
Gold medal – first place	2025 Bangkok and Chonburi	Team
Silver medal – second place	2021 Hanoi	Team
Bronze medal – third place	2007 Nakhon Ratchasima	Team
Bronze medal – third place	2011 Jakarta and Palembang	Team
Bronze medal – third place	2013 Naypyidaw	Team

The Indonesia national futsal team (Indonesian: Tim nasional futsal Indonesia) represents Indonesia in international futsal competitions. Indonesia has played sixteen times at the ASEAN Futsal Championship and ten times at the AFC Futsal Asian Cup. The team never participates in any World Cup but has won the ASEAN Futsal Championship twice in 2010 and 2024. While under the ultimate control of Indonesia's football governing body, PSSI, the one who oversees the activities of the national futsal team is the Indonesia Futsal Federation—futsal governing body of Indonesia and a member association of PSSI.

== History ==
The history of futsal has been around for a long time in Indonesia. The first futsal league competition in Indonesia was held in 2006 and called the Indonesia Futsal League (IFL), and the Liga Futsal Wanita Indonesia (LFWI) was held in 2012. In 2015, IFL changed its name to PFL, and LFWI changed the name to WPFL. Names such as Wandy Batangtaris, a member of the FIFA Futsal Committee, and Ronny Pattinasarany and Hary Tanoesoedibjo are mentioned as pioneers of futsal in Indonesia.

=== 2002–2003: The beginning ===
The journey of futsal started in 1998–1999, but it was in 2002 that the sport was officially recognized in Indonesia when the country was asked to host the 2002 AFC Futsal Championship in Jakarta by the AFC. The national team was first formed under PSSI. Ronny Pattinasarany, the father of futsal in Indonesia, recommended Sartono Anwar to be appointed as the first ever head coach of the team. Sartono was appointed as head coach, alongside Suhatman Iman who served as his assistant. Despite only having three months to form the team consisted of football players from Liga Indonesia, Indonesia able to compete in the tournament, but weren't able to proceed to the quarterfinals. However, they won the first ever competitive match against China in the group stage.

The team then competed in the AFF Futsal Championship for the 2003 edition. Sartono brought the team to third place with four wins and two defeats.

== Kit ==
For most of the time, the Indonesian national futsal team used whatever kits that were being used by the Indonesia national football team. At the start of 2021, FFI decided to have their own kit supplier for all Indonesia futsal national teams. They chose Specs to be the kit supplier. Specs have been the official kit supplier of all Indonesia futsal national teams ever since, having provided four jerseys for the national teams with first releasing the home jersey on 5 April 2021. Specs released the white-colored away jersey on 24 May 2021. The green-colored third jersey was released on 2 August 2021. Right before the start of the 2022 AFC Futsal Asian Cup, Specs collaborated with Indonesian artist based in Bandung, Stereoflow, to release the street art-inspired fourth jersey on 24 May 2022 which was also intended to be used by Indonesia national amputee football (INAF) team for the 2022 Amputee Football World Cup.

== Results and fixtures ==
The following is a list of match results in the last 12 months, as well as any future matches that have been scheduled.

Win Draw Loss Fixture

=== 2025 ===
15 December 2025 2025 SEA Games	Indonesia	5–1	Myanmar	Nonthaburi, Thailand
16:00 UTC+7	Israr Megantara 2'; Iqbal Iskandar 8', 9'; Rizki Xavier 32'; Syauqi Saud 39'	Report		Stadium: Nonthaburi Sports Complex Gymnasium

17 December 2025 2025 SEA Games	Vietnam	1–0	Indonesia	Nonthaburi, Thailand
16:00 UTC+7	Từ Minh Quang 11'	Report		Stadium: Nonthaburi Sports Complex Gymnasium

18 December 2025 2025 SEA Games	Indonesia	2–1	Malaysia	Nonthaburi, Thailand
16:00 UTC+7	Evan Soumilena 4'; Reza Gunawan 13'	Report	Brian Ick 17' (o.g.)	Stadium: Nonthaburi Sports Complex Gymnasium

19 December 2025 2025 SEA Games	Thailand	1–6	Indonesia	Nonthaburi, Thailand
19:00 UTC+7	Krit Aransanyalak 37'		Firman Adriansyah 13' (pen.); Syauqi Saud 17'; Samuel Eko 23'; Rizki Amanda 29'; Ardiansyah Nur 35', 39'	Stadium: Nonthaburi Sports Complex Gymnasium; Referee: Moon Dae-sung (South Korea)

=== 2026 ===
27 January 2026 2026 AFC Futsal Asian Cup GS	Indonesia	5–0	South Korea	Jakarta, Indonesia
19:00 UTC+7	Iqbal 1'16", 20'54"; Rio Pangestu 10'29"; Israr 28'52"; Reza Gunawan 36'03"	Report		Stadium: Indonesia Arena; Referee: Andrew Best (Australia), Oya Tsubasa (Japan)

29 January 2026 2026 AFC Futsal Asian Cup GS	Kyrgyzstan	3–5	Indonesia	Jakarta, Indonesia
19:00 UTC+7	Makhmadaminov 5'55", 26'00"; Alimov 26'23" (pen.)	Report	Iqbal 6'51"; F. Adriansyah 11'57" (pen.); Rio 24'35"; Ardiansyah Nur 28'38"; Israr 33'50"	Stadium: Indonesia Arena; Referee: Sukhrob Sattorov (Tajikistan), Anatoliy Rubakov (Uzbekistan)

31 January 2026 2026 AFC Futsal Asian Cup GS	Indonesia	1–1	Iraq	Jakarta, Indonesia
19:00 UTC+7	Samuel Eko 5'41"	Report	Haedr Majed 29'27"	Stadium: Indonesia Arena; Referee: Yahya Al-Athwani (Saudi Arabia), Ebrahim Mehrabiafshar (Iran)

3 February 2026 2026 AFC Futsal Asian Cup QF	Indonesia	3–2	Vietnam	Jakarta, Indonesia
19:00 UTC+7	Brian Ick 3'47"; Ardiansyah 10'23"; Reza 25'40"	Report	Nguyễn Đa Hải 24'51", 35'43"	Stadium: Indonesia Arena; Referee: Hawkar Ahmed (Iraq), Pornnarong Grairod (Thailand)

5 February 2026 2026 AFC Futsal Asian Cup SF	Indonesia	5–3 (a.e.t.)	Japan	Jakarta, Indonesia
19:00 UTC+7	Samuel Eko 11'30"; Motoishi 22'07" (o.g.); F. Adriansyah 38'22"; Reza 44'16"; Dewa Rizki 47'01"	Report	Motoishi 30'21"; Shimizu 34'17", 39'22" (pen.)	Stadium: Indonesia Arena; Referee: Fahad Al-Hosani (United Arab Emirates), Anatoliy Rubakov (Uzbekistan)

7 February 2026 2026 AFC Futsal Asian Cup F	Indonesia	5–5 (a.e.t.) (4–5 p)	Iran	Jakarta, Indonesia
19:00 UTC+7	Reza 6'28"; Israr 7'37", 8'31", 48'05"; Samuel Eko 23'20"	Report	Tayebi 2'53"; Karimi 17'59", 36'53"; Ahmadabbasi 22'57"; Aghapour 48'42"	Stadium: Indonesia Arena; Referee: Liu Jianqiao (China), Sukhrob Sattorov (Tajikistan)
	Penalties
	F. Adriansyah (penalty scored); Rio (penalty scored); Rizki Xavier (penalty scored); Dewa Rizki (penalty missed); Ardiansyah (penalty scored); Israr (penalty missed)		(penalty missed) Shavardazi; (penalty scored) Derakhshani; (penalty scored) Ahmadabbasi; (penalty scored) Aghapour; (penalty scored) Tayebi; (penalty scored) Sabzi

6 April 2026 2026 ASEAN Futsal Championship GS	Indonesia	7–0	Brunei	Nonthaburi, Thailand
12:30 UTC+7	Sanjaya 4', 4', 20'; Kareth 10', 24'; I. Anshori 12'; Rizki 17'	Report		Stadium: Nonthaburi Sports Complex Gymnasium; Referee: Benjapol Mucharoensap (Thailand)

7 April 2026 2026 ASEAN Futsal Championship GS	Malaysia	0–1	Indonesia	Nonthaburi, Thailand
15:00 UTC+7		Report	G. Sulistyo 23'	Stadium: Nonthaburi Sports Complex Gymnasium; Referee: Takeshi Fujita (Japan)

8 April 2026 2026 ASEAN Futsal Championship GS	Indonesia	3–2	Australia	Nonthaburi, Thailand
12:30 UTC+7	A. Putra 9', 36'; Sanjaya 40'	Report	Harb 19'; Garnham 36'	Stadium: Nonthaburi Sports Complex Gymnasium; Referee: Takeshi Fujita (Japan)

10 April 2026 2026 ASEAN Futsal Championship SF	Indonesia	3–2	Vietnam	Nonthaburi, Thailand
17:00 UTC+7	Kareth 10', 13'; Sanjaya 23'	Report	Nguyễn Đa Hải 22'; Trần Quang Nguyên 30'	Stadium: Nonthaburi Sports Complex Gymnasium; Referee: Moon Dae-sung (South Korea)

12 April 2026 2026 ASEAN Futsal Championship F	Indonesia	1–2	Thailand	Nonthaburi, Thailand
20:00 UTC+7	Putra 16'	Report	Itticha 20'; Panat 31'	Stadium: Nonthaburi Sports Complex Gymnasium; Referee: Takeshi Fujita (Japan)

15 August 2026 Training Camp and Exhibition Match 2026	Indonesia	3–5	(Spain) O Parrulo FS	Chantada, Spain
01:30 UTC+7

19 August 2026 Training Camp and Exhibition Match 2026	Indonesia	1–6	(Spain) AE Palma Futsal	Chantada, Spain
01:30 UTC+7

21 August 2026 Training Camp and Exhibition Match 2026	Indonesia	2–5	(Spain) Noia Fútbol Sala	Noia, Spain
23:00 UTC+7

16 October 2026 Copa das Nações de Futsal 2026	Indonesia	0-3	Brazil	São José dos Pinhais, Brazil
05:00 UTC+7				Stadium: Max Rosenmann Arena

17 October 2026 Copa das Nações de Futsal 2026	Indonesia	0-2	Cape Verde	São José dos Pinhais, Brazil
06:30 UTC+7				Stadium: Max Rosenmann Arena

{{Football box collapsible

| format = 1 | date = 18 October 2026 | round = Copa das Nações de Futsal 2026 | time = 00:00 UTC+7 | team1 = Peru | score =2-1 | team2 = Indonesia | goals1 = | goals2 = | stadium =Max Rosenmann Arena | attendance = | referee = | report = | location = São José dos Pinhais, Brazil | result =L

== Coaching staff ==
As of 10 November 2024

Position	Name
Head coach	Héctor Souto
Assistant coach	Muhammad Amril Daulay
Goalkeeping coach	Eka Sanjaya
Physical trainer	Ilham Mulyawan
Team medic	Fortunella Levyana
Team manager	Dimas Bagus Agung Kurniawan

=== Head coaches list ===
Period	Coach	Tournaments
2002	(Indonesia) Sartono Anwar	2002 AFC Futsal Championship - Group stage
2003	(Iran) Naseer Saleh	2003 AFC Futsal Championship - Group stage 2003 AFF Futsal Championship - (bronze) Third place
2004	(Indonesia) Azaria Urias Rahantoknam	2004 AFC Futsal Championship - Group stage
2004–2009	(Indonesia) Justinus Lhaksana	2005 AFC Futsal Championship - Plate competition round 2006 AFC Futsal Championship - Group stage 2007 AFF Futsal Championship - Group Stage Futsal at the 2007 Asian Indoor Games - Preliminary Round Futsal at the 2007 SEA Games - (bronze) Bronze Medal; 2008 AFC Futsal Championship - Group stage 2008 AFF Futsal Championship - (silver) Runners-up; 2009 AFF Futsal Championship - (bronze) Third place
2010–2011	(Indonesia) Robby Hartono	2010 AFC Futsal Championship - Round 1; 2010 AFF Futsal Championship - (gold) Champions; 2011 Southeast Asian Games - (bronze) Third place
2012–2014	(Indonesia) Andri Irawan	2012 AFF Futsal Championship - (bronze) Third place 2012 AFC Futsal Championship - Round 1; 2013 AFF Futsal Championship - Fourth place Futsal at the 2013 Asian Indoor and Martial Arts Games - Round 1; 2013 Southeast Asian Games - (bronze) Third place 2014 AFC Futsal Championship - Round 1
2014–2016	(Indonesia) Dadang Iskandar	2014 AFF Futsal Championship - Fourth place 2016 AFF Futsal Championship - Group stage
2017	(Netherlands) Victor Hermans	2017 AFF Futsal Championship - Group stage
2018–2021	(Japan) Kensuke Takahashi	2018 AFF Futsal Championship - (bronze) Third place 2019 AFF Futsal Championship - (silver) Runners-up
2022–2023	(Iran) Mohammad Hashemzadeh	2022 AFF Futsal Championship - (silver) Runners-up; 2021 Southeast Asian Games - (silver) Runners-up; 2022 AFC Futsal Asian Cup - Quarter-Final
2023–2024	(Brazil) Marcos Sorato	
2024–	(Spain) Héctor Souto	2024 ASEAN Futsal Championship - (gold) Champions; 2025 SEA Games - (gold) Champions; 2026 AFC Futsal Asian Cup - (silver) Runners-up; 2026 ASEAN Futsal Championship - (silver) Runners-up

== Players ==
=== Current squad ===
The following 15 players were called up to the team for the Copa das Nações de Futsal 2026 hosted by Brazil on 12–18 October 2026.

No.	Pos.	Player	Date of birth (age)	Caps	Goals	Club
	GK	Ahmad Habiebie	21 June 2000 (age 26)			(Football Association of Indonesia) Bintang Timur
	GK	Muhammad Nizar	17 February 1995 (age 31)			(Football Association of Indonesia) Unggul FC
	DF	Ardiansyah Nur	30 August 1997 (age 29)			(Football Association of Indonesia) Black Steel
	DF	Dewa Rizki Amanda	16 January 2001 (age 25)			(Football Association of Indonesia) Cosmo JNE
	DF	Rio Pangestu	30 August 1997 (age 29)			(Football Association of Indonesia) Bintang Timur
	DF	Rizki Xavier	15 January 1999 (age 27)			(Football Association of Indonesia) Cosmo JNE
	MF	Andarias Kareth	2005 (age 20–21)			(Football Association of Indonesia) Bintang Timur
	MF	Mochammad Iqbal Iskandar (captain)	23 August 1995 (age 31)			(Football Association of Indonesia) Bintang Timur
	MF	Romi Humandri	7 November 1999 (age 27)			(Football Association of Indonesia) Bintang Timur
	MF	Ronal Drion Bonay	17 March 2004 (age 22)			(Football Association of Indonesia) Black Steel
	MF	Syauqi Saud Lubis	29 January 1997 (age 29)			(Football Association of Indonesia) Bintang Timur
	MF	Yogi Saputra	17 June 2003 (age 23)			(Football Association of Indonesia) Bintang Timur
	FW	Andres Dwi Persada	7 July 2000 (age 26)			(Football Association of Indonesia) Unggul FC
	FW	Israr Megantara	19 October 2004 (age 22)			(Polish Football Association) Widzew Łódź
	FW	Samuel Eko	16 May 1998 (age 28)			(Football Association of Indonesia) Bintang Timur

=== Recent call-ups ===
The following players have also been called up to the squad within the last 12 months.

Pos.	Player	Date of birth (age)	Caps	Goals	Club	Latest call-up
GK	Angga Ariansyah	1 August 2000 (age 26)			(Indonesia) Unggul FC	2026 ASEAN Futsal Championship
GK	Muhammad Albagir	13 December 1997 (age 28)			(Indonesia) Black Steel	Copa das Nações de Futsal 2026^{PRE}
DF	Dipo Arrahman	24 July 2001 (age 25)			(Indonesia) Pangsuma	2026 ASEAN Futsal Championship
DF	Piter Everardus Masriat	24 November 1998 (age 27)			(Indonesia) Black Steel	2026 ASEAN Futsal Championship
MF	Adityas Priambudi Wibowo	19 October 2000 (age 26)			(Indonesia) Black Steel	2026 ASEAN Futsal Championship
MF	Firman Adriansyah	9 February 2000 (age 26)			(Indonesia) Cosmo JNE	2026 AFC Futsal Asian Cup
MF	Guntur Sulistyo	29 October 2001 (age 25)			(Indonesia) Bintang Timur	2026 ASEAN Futsal Championship
MF	G-Vin Blandino Laik	18 September 1999 (age 27)			(Indonesia) Unggul FC	Copa das Nações de Futsal 2026^{PRE}
MF	Muhammad Imam Anshori	20 December 2003 (age 22)			(Indonesia) Pangsuma	2026 ASEAN Futsal Championship
MF	Muhammad Rizky Fauzan	23 February 2002 (age 24)			(Indonesia) Pangsuma	Copa das Nações de Futsal 2026^{PRE}
MF	Reza Gunawan	25 October 1998 (age 28)			(Indonesia) Cosmo JNE	2026 AFC Futsal Asian Cup
MF	Wendy Brian Ick	14 October 1999 (age 27)			(Indonesia) Black Steel	Copa das Nações de Futsal 2026^{PRE}
FW	Evan Soumilena	19 November 1996 (age 29)			(Indonesia) Black Steel	2026 AFC Futsal Asian Cup^{PRE / INJ}
FW	Kris Daniel Yeimo	2004 (age 21–22)			(Indonesia) Black Steel	2026 ASEAN Futsal Championship
FW	Muhammad Sanjaya	9 September 1999 (age 27)			(Indonesia) Kuda Laut Nusantara	Copa das Nações de Futsal 2026^{PRE}
FW	Nerva Jhorgie Walken	2008 (age 17–18)			(Indonesia) Proton FC	Copa das Nações de Futsal 2026^{PRE}
Notes: ^{PRE} = Preliminary Squad; ^{SUS} = Suspended; ^{INJ} = Withdrew from the roster due to an injury; ^{UNF} = Withdrew from the roster due to unfit condition; ^{RET} = Retired from the national team; ^{WD} = Withdrew from the roster for non-injury related reasons

== Competitive record ==
=== FIFA Futsal World Cup ===
FIFA Futsal World Cup record
Year	Round	Pld	W	D*	L	GS	GA
(Netherlands) 1989	Did not enter						
(Hong Kong) 1992	Did not enter						
(Spain) 1996	Did not enter						
(Guatemala) 2000	Did not enter						
(Taiwan) 2004	Did not qualify						
(Brazil) 2008	Did not qualify						
(Thailand) 2012	Did not qualify						
(Colombia) 2016	Banned						
(Lithuania) 2021	Did not qualify						
(Uzbekistan) 2024	Did not qualify						
Total	-	-	-	-	-	-	-

=== AFC Futsal Asian Cup ===
AFC Futsal Asian Cup									Qualification							
Year	Round	M	W	D	L	GF	GA	GD	M	W	D	L	GF	GA	GD	Link
(Malaysia) 1999	Did not enter								No qualification							
(Thailand) 2000	Did not enter								No qualification							
(Iran) 2001	Did not enter								No qualification							
(Indonesia) 2002	Group stage	4	1	1	2	12	11	+1	No qualification							
(Iran) 2003	Group stage	3	0	0	3	14	20	+6	No qualification							
(Macau) 2004	Group stage	4	1	0	3	11	22	-11	No qualification							
(Vietnam) 2005	Group stage	6	3	1	2	33	20	+13	No qualification							
(Uzbekistan) 2006	Group stage	3	0	0	3	8	38	-20	Automatically qualified							Link
(Japan) 2007	Did not qualify								3	1	0	2	26	17	+9	Link
(Thailand) 2008	Group stage	3	1	0	2	6	20	-14	4	3	0	1	19	6	+13	Link
(Uzbekistan) 2010	Group stage	3	1	0	2	10	9	+1	4	2	0	2	13	11	+2	Link
(United Arab Emirates) 2012	Group stage	3	0	0	3	6	23	-17	5	3	0	2	23	11	+12	Link
(Vietnam) 2014	Group stage	3	1	0	2	5	13	-8	2013 AFF Futsal Championship							Link
(Uzbekistan) 2016	Banned								2015 AFF Futsal Championship							Link
(Taiwan) 2018	Did not qualify								2017 AFF Futsal Championship							Link
(Turkmenistan) 2020	Cancelled								2019 AFF Futsal Championship							Link
(Kuwait) 2022	Quarter-finals	4	2	0	2	13	11	+2	2022 AFF Futsal Championship							Link
(Thailand) 2024	Did not qualify								3	1	1	1	21	10	+11	Link
(Indonesia) 2026	Runners-up	6	4	2	0	24	14	+10	Qualified as host							Link
Total	Best: Runners-up	42	14	4	24	142	201	-59	19	10	1	8	102	55	+47	–

=== Asian Indoor and Martial Arts Games ===
Asian Indoor and Martial Arts Games record
Year	Round	Pld	W	D	L	GS	GA
(Thailand) 2005	Did not enter						
(Macau) 2007	Group stage	4	2	0	2	7	12
(Vietnam) 2009	Did not enter						
(South Korea) 2013	Group stage	2	1	0	1	10	7
(Turkmenistan) 2017	Did not enter						
(Saudi Arabia) 2026	To be determined						
Total	Best: Group stage	6	3	0	3	17	19

=== ASEAN Futsal Championship ===
ASEAN Futsal Championship record
Year	Result	GP	W	D	L	GS	GA
(Malaysia) 2001	Did not enter						
(Malaysia) 2003	Third Place	5	3	0	2	29	22
(Thailand) 2005	Third Place	6	3	0	3	23	21
(Thailand) 2006	Runners-up	5	4	0	1	19	17
(Thailand) 2007	Group stage	3	1	1	1	6	7
(Thailand) 2008	Runners-up	5	4	0	1	23	9
(Vietnam) 2009	Third Place	5	3	0	2	22	16
(Vietnam) 2010	Champions	5	5	0	0	24	5
(Thailand) 2012	Third Place	6	4	0	2	45	18
(Thailand) 2013	Fourth Place	6	3	0	3	39	28
(Malaysia) 2014	Fourth Place	6	4	1	1	35	9
(Thailand) 2015	Banned						
(Thailand) 2016	Group stage	3	1	0	2	27	13
(Vietnam) 2017	Group stage	4	2	0	2	35	7
(Indonesia) 2018	Third Place	5	3	0	2	28	12
(Vietnam) 2019	Runners-up	5	3	1	1	15	13
(Thailand) 2020	Cancelled						
(Thailand) 2021	Cancelled						
(Thailand) 2022	Runners-up	6	4	2	0	38	8
(Thailand) 2024	Champions	5	5	0	0	24	3
(Thailand) 2026	Runners-up	5	4	0	1	15	6
Total	Best: Champions	85	56	5	24	447	214

=== SEA Games ===
SEA Games record
Year	Round	Pld	W	D*	L	GS	GA
(Thailand) 2007	Third Place	4	3	0	1	23	7
(Laos) 2009	No competition as not officially selected by host						
(Indonesia) 2011	Third Place	4	2	1	1	18	16
(Myanmar) 2013	Third Place	4	2	1	1	12	12
(Singapore) 2015	No competition as not officially selected by host						
(Malaysia) 2017	Fourth Place	4	1	0	3	7	14
(Philippines) 2019	No competition as not officially selected by host						
(Vietnam) 2021	Runners-up	4	2	2	0	11	2
(Cambodia) 2023	No competition as not officially selected by host						
(Thailand) 2025	Champions	4	3	0	1	13	4
Total	Best: Champions	24	13	4	7	84	55

*Denotes draws include knockout matches decided on penalty kicks.
**Red border color indicates tournament was held on home soil.

== Head-to-head record ==
As of matches played on 12 April 2026.

Team	Pld.	W	D*	L	GF	GA	GD
Afghanistan	1	0	1	0	7	7	0
Argentina	3	0	0	3	3	30	−27
Australia	10	4	0	6	26	33	−7
Azerbaijan	2	1	1	0	5	4	+1
Bahrain	1	1	0	0	3	0	+3
Belarus	1	1	0	0	2	1	+1
Belgium	2	1	0	1	5	19	−14
Brunei	10	9	0	1	85	12	+73
Cambodia	8	8	0	0	62	14	+48
Chile	1	1	0	0	3	1	+2
China	5	3	0	2	23	18	+5
Chinese Taipei	5	4	0	1	28	10	+18
Colombia	1	0	0	1	2	3	–1
Costa Rica	1	1	0	0	6	0	+6
Czech Republic	1	1	0	0	5	1	+4
Denmark	1	1	0	0	4	2	+2
Egypt	1	0	0	1	2	4	–2
England	2	2	0	0	10	4	+6
Finland	2	1	1	0	10	3	+7
France	1	0	0	1	0	3	–3
Greece	2	1	1	0	8	4	+4
Guatemala	2	1	1	0	8	5	+3
Guam	2	2	0	0	36	4	+32
Hong Kong	2	0	0	2	9	14	–5
Iran	8	0	1	7	12	72	−60
Iraq	3	1	1	1	10	14	−4
Italy	1	0	0	1	1	7	–6
Japan	6	2	0	4	10	27	−17
Jordan	1	0	0	1	1	2	–1
Kuwait	3	1	0	2	6	12	–6
Kyrgyzstan	4	2	1	1	12	13	–1
Laos	4	4	0	0	42	4	+38
Latvia	1	0	0	1	2	3	–1
Lebanon	4	1	0	3	12	14	–2
Macau	1	1	0	0	12	0	+12
Malaysia	28	16	3	9	97	77	+20
Mexico	1	0	0	1	0	4	–4
Morocco	1	0	0	1	0	4	–4
Mongolia	1	1	0	0	6	1	+5
Myanmar	19	15	1	3	86	39	+47
Netherlands	2	1	0	1	5	4	+1
New Zealand	2	2	0	0	8	4	+4
Philippines	10	10	0	0	85	12	+73
Qatar	1	1	0	0	6	1	+5
Panama	1	1	0	0	4	0	+4
Portugal	1	0	0	1	1	4	–3
Romania	1	1	0	0	5	1	+4
Russia	1	0	0	1	1	4	–3
Saudi Arabia	2	1	0	1	5	3	+2
South Africa	1	1	0	0	1	0	+1
South Korea	7	4	0	3	24	15	+9
Spain	2	0	1	1	2	4	–2
Tanzania	1	1	0	0	7	1	+6
Tajikistan	1	0	0	1	2	4	–2
Thailand	23	4	3	16	48	102	−54
Timor-Leste	3	3	0	0	42	5	+37
Turkmenistan	1	1	0	0	7	2	+5
Ukraine	2	0	0	2	2	8	–6
United States	1	0	0	1	3	9	−6
Uzbekistan	5	0	0	5	5	19	−14
Vietnam	19	7	6	6	43	44	–1
Total	237	125	22	92	955	731	+224

== Honours ==
=== Continental ===
- AFC Futsal Asian Cup
  - (silver) Runners-up (1): 2026

=== Regional ===
- ASEAN Futsal Championship
  - (gold) Champions (2): 2010, 2024
  - (silver) Runners-up (5): 2006, 2008, 2019, 2022, 2026
  - (bronze) Third place (5): 2003, 2005, 2009, 2012, 2018
  - Fourth place (2): 2013, 2014
- SEA Games
  - (gold) Gold medal (1): 2025
  - (silver) Silver medal (1): 2021
  - (bronze) Bronze medal (3): 2007, 2011, 2013
  - Fourth place (1): 2017
- ASEAN University Games
  - (gold) Gold medal (1): 2024

=== Friendly Tournaments ===
- CFA International Futsal Tournament
  - (gold) Champions (1): 2025
  - (silver) Runners-up (1): 2016
- MNC Futsal Championship/MNC Futsal Cup/MNC Cup
  - (gold) Champions (2): 2014, 2022
  - (silver) Runners-up (1): 2019
- 4Nations World Series
  - (silver) Runners-up (1): 2025
- AQUA Four Nations Cup
  - (silver) Runners-up (1): 2025

== See also ==
- Indonesia national under-20 futsal team
- Indonesia women's national futsal team
- Indonesia national football team
- Indonesia national beach soccer team
