= Apiwat Chaemcharoen =

Thai futsal player (born 1991)

Personal information
- Full name: Apiwat Chaemcharoen
- Date of birth: 31 March 1991 (age 35)
- Place of birth: Bangkok, Thailand
- Height: 1.63 m (5 ft 4 in)
- Position: Winger

Team information
- Current team: Chonburi Bluewave
- Number: 19

Youth career
- 2007–2009: Patumkongka School

Senior career*
Years	Team	Apps	(Gls)
2010–2011	Lampang United	33	(21)
2012	GHB RBAC	16	(9)
2013–	Chonburi Bluewave	81	(60)

International career^{‡}
2011–	Thailand Futsal	32	(22)
Medal record
Thailand national football team
Sea Games
Gold medal – first place	2011 Southeast Asian Games	Futsal
AFF Futsal Championship
Gold medal – first place	AFF Futsal Championship 2012	Futsal
Asian Championship
Silver medal – second place	AFC Futsal Championship 2012	Futsal
Silver medal – second place	AFC Futsal Championship 2024	Futsal
- * Club domestic league appearances and goals ‡ National team caps and goals as of 13:05, 23 May 2008 (UTC)

Apiwat Chaemcharoen (Thai อภิวัฒน์ แจ่มเจริญ), is a Thai futsal midfielder, and currently a member of Thailand national futsal team.

== International goals ==
Scores and results list Thailand's goal tally first.

No.	Date	Venue	Opponent	Score	Result	Goals	Competition
1.	5 November 2018	Yogyakarta, Indonesia	Timor-Leste	14–0	won	1	2018 AFF Futsal Championship
2.	6 November 2018	Yogyakarta, Indonesia	Brunei	17–0	won	2	2018 AFF Futsal Championship
3.	9 November 2018	Yogyakarta, Indonesia	Indonesia	3–2 (a.e.t.)	won	2	2018 AFF Futsal Championship
4.	11 November 2018	Yogyakarta, Indonesia	Malaysia	4–2	won	1	2018 AFF Futsal Championship
5.	22 October 2019	Ho Chi Minh City, Vietnam	Timor-Leste	12–1	won	1	2019 AFF Futsal Championship
6.	2 April 2022	Bangkok, Thailand	Brunei	13–0	won	1	2022 AFF Futsal Championship
7.	3 April 2022	Bangkok, Thailand	Cambodia	16–0	won	1	2022 AFF Futsal Championship
8.	18 May 2022	Phủ Lý, Vietnam	Indonesia	1–1	drawn	1	2021 Southeast Asian Games

== Honours ==
Thailand

- AFC Futsal Asian Cup Runners-up: 2012, 2024
