= 2016 AFF Futsal Championship =

Tournament details
- Host country: Thailand
- City: Bangkok
- Dates: 23–29 January
- Teams: 7 (from 1 confederation)
- Venue: 1 (in 1 host city)

Final positions
- Champions: Thailand (12th title)
- Runners-up: Myanmar
- Third place: Malaysia
- Fourth place: Timor-Leste

Tournament statistics
- Matches played: 13
- Goals scored: 152 (11.69 per match)
- Top scorer: (Myanmar) Pyae Phyo Maung (8 goals)
- Best player: (Thailand) Jirawat Sornwichian
- Fair play award: Thailand

The 2016 AFF Futsal Championship is the 13th edition of the tournament which been held from 23 to 29 January 2017. It was initially planned to be held from 31 October to 6 November 2016.

Following the death of King Bhumibol Adulyadej, the Football Association of Thailand postponed to host the 2016 AFF Futsal Championship. Football Association of Indonesia (PSSI) offered to host 2016 AFF Futsal Championship after Thailand postponed. The event was rescheduled to 9 – 15 November 2016.

On 21 October 2016, AFF officially announced that the event will be cancelled due to the withdrawing from being the host of PSSI. AFF asked Singapore to be the new host but they were unable to operate the event in short time of the preparation. Due to difficulties of finding new hosts for the tournament, at the 7th AFF Council Meeting held on 29 October 2016, it was decided that the tournament is to be hosted in early 2017 instead.

On 17 December 2016, AFF officially announced the new schedule of the tournament. The tournament had been held in Bangkok. Vietnam and Singapore have pulled out from the tournament due to the internal reasons.

== Qualified teams ==
A total of seven AFF member national teams participated in the tournament. Australia, Cambodia, Singapore and Vietnam didn't participated in this tournament.

Team	Appearance	Previous best performance
Thailand	12th	Winners (2001, 2003, 2005, 2006, 2007, 2008, 2009, 2012, 2013, 2014, 2015)
Brunei	10th	Fourth place (2001, 2005, 2008)
Indonesia	10th	Winners (2010)
Laos	6th	Group stage (2008, 2012, 2013, 2014, 2015)
Malaysia	13th	Runners-up (2003, 2005, 2010)
Myanmar	9th	Third place (2006)
Timor-Leste	6th	Group stage (2009, 2012, 2013, 2014, 2015)

== Venue ==
Bangkok
Indoor Stadium Huamark	Location of stadiums of the 2016 AFF Futsal Championship.
Capacity: 10,000	Location of stadiums of the 2016 AFF Futsal Championship.

== Group stage ==
Tiebreakers

The teams were ranked according to points (3 points for a win, 1 point for a draw, 0 points for a loss). If tied on points, tiebreakers would be applied in the following order:

1. Greater number of points obtained in the group matches between the teams concerned;
2. Goal difference resulting from the group matches between the teams concerned;
3. Greater number of goals scored in the group matches between the teams concerned;
4. If, after applying criteria 1 to 3, teams still have an equal ranking, criteria 1 to 3 are reapplied exclusively to the matches between the teams in question to determine their final rankings. If this procedure does not lead to a decision, criteria 5 to 9 apply;
5. Goal difference in all the group matches;
6. Greater number of goals scored in all the group matches;
7. Penalty shoot-out if only two teams are involved and they are both on the field of play;
8. Fewer score calculated according to the number of yellow and red cards received in the group matches (1 point for a single yellow card, 3 points for a red card as a consequence of two yellow cards, 3 points for a direct red card, 4 points for a yellow card followed by a direct red card);
9. Drawing of lots.

Times listed are UTC+7.

=== Group A ===
Pos	Team	Pld	W	D	L	GF	GA	GD	Pts	Qualification
1	Thailand	2	2	0	0	28	4	+24	6	Knockout stage
2	Timor-Leste	2	1	0	1	10	17	−7	3	Knockout stage
3	Brunei	2	0	0	2	8	25	−17	0	

23 January 2017
19:00

Timor-Leste	2–11	Thailand
Lemigio 12'; Bruno 36'	AFF	7', 20' Peerapol; 8', 26' Sorasak; 11', 34' Kritsada; 13' Tairong; 14' Jirawat; 18' Peerapat; 38' Panya; 39' Muhammad

Indoor Stadium Huamark, Bangkok

24 January 2017
19:00

Brunei	6–8	Timor-Leste
	AFF

Indoor Stadium Huamark, Bangkok

25 January 2017
19:00

Thailand	17–2	Brunei
Tairong 3'; Jirawat 4', 14'; Sorasak 5', 33', 35'; Peerapol 6'; Kritsada 15'; Muhammad 16', 25', 26', 30'; Panat 24', 35', 37'; Panya 29'; Chaivat 33'	AFF	8' Nazirul Haziq Adeni; 14' Abdul Azim Bolhassan

Indoor Stadium Huamark, Bangkok

=== Group B ===
Pos	Team	Pld	W	D	L	GF	GA	GD	Pts	Qualification
1	Myanmar	3	3	0	0	17	7	+10	9	Knockout stage
2	Malaysia	3	2	0	1	22	11	+11	6	Knockout stage
3	Indonesia	3	1	0	2	27	13	+14	3	
4	Laos	3	0	0	3	3	38	−35	0	

23 January 2017
14:00

Malaysia	6–5	Indonesia
Haniffa 7'; Azwann 13'; Azri 14'; Ridzwan 26', 29'; Akmarulnizam 27'	AFF	5' Andri; 10' Randy; 11' Syahidansyah; 14', 19' Ardy Dwi

Indoor Stadium Huamark, Bangkok
23 January 2017
16:30

Myanmar	6–1	Laos
Zaw Linn 13'; Zin Do 22'; Min Soe 27', 40'; Chit Thu 32', 39'	AFF	19' Phasawaeng

Indoor Stadium Huamark, Bangkok

24 January 2017
14:00

Indonesia	3–6	Myanmar
Syahidansyah 4', 15'; Reza 13'	AFF	1', 13', 14', 24' Phyo Maung; 3' Min Soe; 39' Pyone Aung

Indoor Stadium Huamark, Bangkok
24 January 2017
16:30

Laos	1–13	Malaysia
Phiphakkhavong 4'	AFF	1', 31' Akmarulnizam; 2', 23' Effendy; 7', 9', 17' Ridzwan; 10', 16' Haniffa; 24' Azri; 29' Syed; 35' Awaluddin; 39' Awalluddin

Indoor Stadium Huamark, Bangkok

25 January 2017
14:00

Malaysia	3–5	Myanmar
Haniffa 17'; Nizam 18'; Effendy 23'	AFF	31', 39' Min Soe; 32', 40' Phyo Maung; 35' Aung

Indoor Stadium Huamark, Bangkok
25 January 2017
16:30

Indonesia	19–1	Laos
Syahidansyah 3', 16', 17', 28'; Iqbal 8'; Ardiansyah 8', 19', 24'; Andri 10', 33', 34'; Septyan 12'; Fajri 13'; Reza 14', 35'; Bayu 17', 19', 31'; Jaelani 21'	AFF	Phasawaeng 38'

Indoor Stadium Huamark, Bangkok

== Knockout stage ==
Semi-finals
27 January 2017 – Bangkok
Myanmar	8
Timor-Leste	3
27 January 2017– Bangkok
Thailand	5
Malaysia	3

Final
29 January 2017 – Bangkok
Myanmar	1
Thailand	8
Third place match
29 January 2017 – Bangkok
Timor-Leste	1
Malaysia	8

=== Semi-finals ===
27 January 2017
16:30

Myanmar	8–3	Timor-Leste
Ye Kyaw 12'; Zin Oo 17'; Aung Aung 19', 35'; Min Soe 23'; Phyo Maung 25', 31'; Pyone Aung 37'	AFF

Indoor Stadium Huamark, Bangkok
27 January 2017
19:00

Thailand	5–3	Malaysia
Muhammad 21', 23'; Azwann 25' (o.g.); Jirawat 35', 39'	AFF	Nizam 1'; Effendy 9'; Syed 12'

Indoor Stadium Huamark, Bangkok

=== Third place match ===
29 January 2017
16:30

Timor-Leste	1–8	Malaysia
	AFF

Indoor Stadium Huamark, Bangkok

=== Final ===
29 January 2017
19:00

Myanmar	1–8	Thailand
Phyo Maung 15'	AFF	Phyo Maung 8' (o.g.); Jirawat 12', 40'; Chaivat 13'; Peerapol 17'; Panya 22'; Panat 27'; Sorasak 29'

Indoor Stadium Huamark, Bangkok

== Winner ==
2016 ASEAN Futsal Championship winners

Thailand
12th title

== Goalscorers ==
8 goals

- (Myanmar) Pyae Phyo Maung

7 goals

- (Indonesia) Syahidansyah Lubis
- (Thailand) Muhammad Osamanmusa

6 goals

- (Malaysia) Khairul Effendy
- (Malaysia) Ridzwan Bakri
- (Myanmar) Nyein Min Soe
- (Thailand) Jirawat Sornwichian
- (Thailand) Sorasak Phoonjungreed

5 goals

- (Thailand) Panat Kittipanuwong

4 goals

- (Indonesia) Andri Kustiawan
- (Malaysia) Abu Haniffa
- (Thailand) Peerapol Satsue
- (Timor-Leste) Remigio Duarte Lopes da Silva

3 goals

- (Indonesia) Ardiansyah Runtuboy
- (Indonesia) Bambang Bayu Saptaji
- (Indonesia) Reza Yamani
- (Malaysia) Akmarulnizam Idris
- (Malaysia) Muhammad Awaluddin Bin Mat Nawi
- (Malaysia) Muhammad Azri
- (Myanmar) Aung Aung
- (Thailand) Kritsada Wongkaeo
- (Thailand) Panya Aranpoowanart
- (Thailand) Tairong Petchtiam
- (Timor-Leste) Jose Lopes Vide
- (Timor-Leste) Manuel Sa Sarmento

2 goals

- (Brunei) Abdul Azim
- (Brunei) Ak Muhd Naqib
- (Brunei) Maziri Maidin
- (Indonesia) Ardy Dwi Suwardy
- (Laos) Soulichanh Phasawaeng
- (Malaysia) Azwann Ismail
- (Malaysia) Saiful Nizam Bin Mohd Ali
- (Malaysia) Syed Aizad Daniel
- (Myanmar) Aung Zin Oo
- (Myanmar) Kaung Chit Thu
- (Myanmar) Sai Pyone Aung
- (Timor-Leste) Adriel Philbert Pereira

1 goal

- (Brunei) Mohammad Faiz
- (Brunei) Mohammad Nor Azizam
- (Indonesia) Al Fajri Zikri
- (Indonesia) Jaelani Ladjanibi
- (Indonesia) Muhammad Iqbal Iskandar
- (Indonesia) Randy Satria
- (Indonesia) Septyan Dwi Chandra
- (Laos) Khampha Phiphakkhavong
- (Malaysia) Muhammad Awaluddin Bin Hassan
- (Malaysia) Saiful Aula Bin Ahmad
- (Myanmar) Khin Zaw Linn
- (Myanmar) Naing Ye Kyaw
- (Myanmar) Pyae Phyo Maung (2)
- (Thailand) Chaivat Jamgrajang
- (Thailand) Peerapat Kaewwilai
- (Timor-Leste) Bruno Maria Gomes
- (Timor-Leste) Kui Sen Mu

1 own goal

- (Malaysia) Azwann Ismail (playing against Thailand)
- (Myanmar) Pyae Phyo Maung (2) (playing against Thailand)
