= Mohammad Salman =

Mohammad Salman may also refer to:

- Mohammad bin Salman, Crown Prince of Saudi Arabia
- Mohammad Salman (cricketer), former Pakistani Test cricketer
- Mohammad Salman Hamdani, American-Pakistani biochemist
- Mohammad Salman Khan Baloch, Pakistani politician
- Mohamed Salman Al-Khuwalidi, Saudi Arabian long jumper
