= Photha Wattana Senee School =

Photha Watthana Senee School
- โรงเรียนโพธาวัฒนาเสนี

Location
- 80 village number 8 Hospital-Bankong Road, Klong ta kod Photharam, Ratchaburi; Thailand; 13.691852°N 99.861995°E

Information
- Type: Public secondary school
- Motto: Wisdom is the brightest of all light
- Established: 1908
- Authority: Office of the Basic Education Commission
- School number: 1005700701
- Director: Preecha Sukhonthaman
- Grades: 7–12 (Mathayom 1–6)
- Gender: Coeducation
- Enrollment: 2,700
- Colour: Blue-Yellow
- Mascot: Ficus religiosa
- Newspaper: Phothasarn
- Website: http://www.photha.ac.th/

Photha Watthana Senee School (Thai: โรงเรียนโพธาวัฒนาเสนี) is secondary school for grades 7th through grades 12th. Founded by abbot of Wat Photharam in 1908, Photha is the old public secondary school in the Ratchaburi.

== History ==
Photha Wattana Senee School is the oldest school in Photharam District and the first district school of Thailand. The original study in Potharam temple.

== Facts ==
- School Address : 80 village number 8 Hospital-Bankong Road, Klong ta kod Photharam District, Ratchaburi 70120, Thailand
- School Area : Approximately 21.74 Acres
- School Abbreviation : P.N.
- Type of School : Co-education Secondary School (127 teachers and 2,700 students)
- School Motto : (Pali) Nudthi Bhunya Samar R-pha, Wisdom is the brightest of all light

== School Emblem ==
The Ficus religiosa in the circle under the boundary marker of a temple(Sema) and name of school "โพธาวัฒนาเสนี"

== School Colors ==
- Blue is the hardiness.
- Yellow is the exactness.
