= Indoor Stadium Huamark =

Multi-purpose arena in Bangkok, Thailand

- อินดอร์ สเตเดียม หัวหมาก (Thai)
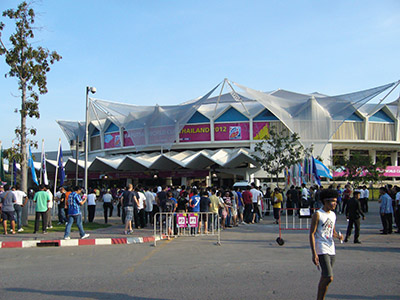
- Interactive map of Indoor Stadium Huamark
- Location: Bangkok, Thailand
- Coordinates: 13°45′27″N 100°37′24″E
- Owner: Sports Authority of Thailand (SAT)
- Capacity: 8,000 seats
- Public transit: ARL Ramkhamhaeng Station; MRT SAT Station (from 2028)

Construction
- Opened: 1966; 60 years ago
- Renovated: 2011-2012, 2025
- Architect: Louis Burgers Company

Tenants
- 1998 Asian Games; 2000 Thailand National Games; 2005 Asian Indoor Games; 2007 Summer Universiade; 2008 AFC Futsal Championship; 2009 Asian Martial Arts Games; 2012 FIFA Futsal World Cup; 2013 BWF World Junior Championships; 2013 FIVB Volleyball World Grand Prix; 2014 FIVB Volleyball World Grand Prix; 2015 FIVB Volleyball World Grand Prix; 2016 FIVB Volleyball World Grand Prix Finals; 2016 AFF Futsal Championship; 2018 AFC Women's Futsal Championship; 2018 FIVB Volleyball Women's Nations League; 2023 FIVB Volleyball Women's Nations League; 2024 AFC Futsal Asian Cup; AFF Futsal Championship (mostly); 2024 FIVB Volleyball Women's Nations League Finals

Indoor Stadium Huamark (Thai: อินดอร์ สเตเดียม หัวหมาก, RTGS: Indo Satediam Hua Mak, pronounced [ʔīn.dɔ̄ː sā.tēː.dîa̯m hǔa̯ màːk]) is an indoor sporting arena, located in Hua Mak Subdistrict, Bang Kapi, Bangkok, Thailand. It is next to Rajamangala National Stadium and is a part of Hua Mak Sports Complex. The original capacity of the arena is 15,000 spectators and it was built in 1966 for the 5th Asian Games. After renovation for 2012 FIFA Futsal World Cup, the capacity is reduced to 6,000 seats and expandable to 8,000 seats.

It is used mainly for concerts, badminton, boxing, basketball, futsal, and volleyball. On 22 May 2001, Irish vocal pop band Westlife held a concert for their Where Dreams Come True Tour supporting their album Coast to Coast.

== History ==
Indoor Stadium Huamark originally named Kittikachorn Stadium, based on the last name of former prime minister Thanom Kittikachorn. The stadium was built for the 1966 Asian Games which was hosted by Thailand. The name was later changed to Indoor Stadium Huamark until today.

== Transportation ==
Indoor Stadium Huamark is accessible via Ramkhamhaeng station of the Airport Rail Link, and will be accessible via SAT station of the MRT Orange Line approximately by 2028.

Events and tenants
Preceded by Maracanãzinho; Rio de Janeiro	FIFA Futsal World Cup; Final Venue; 2012	Succeeded by Coliseo El Pueblo; Cali
