= 2005 AFF Futsal Championship =

Tournament details
- Host country: Thailand
- City: Bangkok
- Dates: 2–7 May
- Teams: 6 (from 1 confederation)
- Venue: 1 (in 1 host city)

Final positions
- Champions: Thailand (3rd title)
- Runners-up: Malaysia
- Third place: Indonesia
- Fourth place: Brunei

Tournament statistics
- Matches played: 18
- Goals scored: 139 (7.72 per match)

The 2005 ASEAN Futsal Championship was the third edition of the tournament. It was held in Bangkok, Thailand from 2 to 7 May 2005.

== Group stage ==
Teams	GP	W	D	L	GF	GA	GD	Pts
Thailand	5	5	0	0	42	3	+39	15
Malaysia	5	3	1	1	20	10	+10	10
Brunei	5	3	1	1	17	21	-4	10
Indonesia	5	2	0	3	16	20	-4	6
Philippines	5	1	0	4	13	31	-18	3
Vietnam	5	0	0	5	12	35	-23	0

2005-05-02
14:00

Malaysia	6 – 3	Philippines

Hua Mark Indoor Stadium

2005-05-02
16:00

Indonesia	5 – 2	Vietnam

Hua Mark Indoor Stadium

2005-05-02
18:00

Thailand	12 – 1	Brunei

Hua Mark Indoor Stadium

2005-05-03
14:00

Vietnam	1 – 6	Malaysia

Hua Mark Indoor Stadium

2005-05-03
16:00

Brunei	6 – 4	Philippines

Hua Mark Indoor Stadium

2005-05-03
18:00

Indonesia	0 – 7	Thailand

Hua Mark Indoor Stadium

2005-05-04
14:00

Vietnam	3 – 6	Brunei

Hua Mark Indoor Stadium

2005-05-04
16:00

Philippines	0 – 7	Thailand

Hua Mark Indoor Stadium

2005-05-04
18:00

Malaysia	7 – 2	Indonesia

Hua Mark Indoor Stadium

2005-05-05
14:00

Philippines	1 – 8	Indonesia

Hua Mark Indoor Stadium

2005-05-05
16:00

Brunei	1 – 1	Malaysia

Hua Mark Indoor Stadium

2005-05-05
18:00

Thailand	13 – 2	Vietnam

Hua Mark Indoor Stadium

2005-05-06
14:00

Vietnam	4 – 5	Philippines

Hua Mark Indoor Stadium

2005-05-06
16:00

Indonesia	1 – 3	Brunei

Hua Mark Indoor Stadium

2005-05-06
18:00

Thailand	3 – 0	Malaysia

Hua Mark Indoor Stadium

== Fifth/Sixth place ==
2005-05-07
11:30

Philippines	0 – 5	Vietnam

Hua Mark Indoor Stadium

== Third/Fourth place ==
2005-05-07
13:30

Brunei	1 – 7	Indonesia

Hua Mark Indoor Stadium

== Final ==
2005-05-07
15:30

Thailand	5 – 1	Malaysia

Hua Mark Indoor Stadium

== Champions ==
2005 ASEAN Futsal Championship winners

Thailand
3rd title
