= 2006 AFF Futsal Championship =

Tournament details
- Host country: Thailand
- City: Bangkok
- Dates: 2–7 May
- Teams: 7 (from 1 confederation)
- Venue: 1 (in 1 host city)

Final positions
- Champions: Thailand (4th title)
- Runners-up: Indonesia
- Third place: Myanmar
- Fourth place: Cambodia

Tournament statistics
- Matches played: 13
- Goals scored: 142 (10.92 per match)

The 2006 AFF Futsal Championship was the fourth edition of the tournament. It took place from 2 to 7 May 2006 in Bangkok, Thailand.

== Group stage ==
- All times are Indochina Time (ICT) – UTC+07:00

=== Group A ===
Team	Pld	W	D	L	GF	GA	GD	Pts
Thailand	2	2	0	0	30	3	+27	6
Myanmar	2	1	0	1	10	24	−14	3
Brunei	2	0	0	2	2	15	−13	0
Timor-Leste	Withdrew due to financial reasons							

2 May 2006
18:00

Thailand	8 – 0	Brunei

Hua Mark Indoor Stadium, Bangkok

3 May 2006
18:00

Brunei	2 – 7	Myanmar

Hua Mark Indoor Stadium, Bangkok

4 May 2006
18:00

Myanmar	3 – 22	Thailand

Hua Mark Indoor Stadium, Bangkok

=== Group B ===
Team	Pld	W	D	L	GF	GA	GD	Pts
Indonesia	3	3	0	0	11	4	+7	9
Cambodia	3	2	0	1	12	11	+1	6
Malaysia	3	1	0	2	11	9	+2	3
Vietnam	3	0	0	3	13	23	−10	0

2 May 2006
14:00

Malaysia	2 – 3	Cambodia

Hua Mark Indoor Stadium, Bangkok
2 May 2006
16:00

Vietnam	3 – 6	Indonesia

Hua Mark Indoor Stadium, Bangkok

3 May 2006
14:00

Cambodia	1 – 3	Indonesia

Hua Mark Indoor Stadium, Bangkok
3 May 2006
16:00

Vietnam	4 – 9	Malaysia

Hua Mark Indoor Stadium, Bangkok

4 May 2006
14:00

Cambodia	8 – 6	Vietnam

Hua Mark Indoor Stadium, Bangkok
4 May 2006
16:00

Indonesia	2 – 0	Malaysia

Hua Mark Indoor Stadium, Bangkok

== Knockout stage ==
- All times are Indochina Time (ICT) – UTC+07:00

=== Bracket ===
Semi-finals
6 May – Bangkok
Indonesia	5
Myanmar	3
6 May – Bangkok
Thailand	19
Cambodia	1

Final
7 May – Bangkok
Indonesia	3
Thailand	10
Third place
7 May – Bangkok
Myanmar	10
Cambodia	2

=== Semi-finals ===
6 May 2006
14:00

Indonesia	5 – 3	Myanmar

Hua Mark Indoor Stadium, Bangkok
6 May 2006
16:00

Thailand	19 – 1	Cambodia

Hua Mark Indoor Stadium, Bangkok

=== Third place play-off ===
7 May 2006
15:00

Myanmar	10 – 2	Cambodia

Hua Mark Indoor Stadium, Bangkok

=== Final ===
7 May 2006
17:00

Indonesia	3 – 10	Thailand

Hua Mark Indoor Stadium, Bangkok

== Champions ==
2006 ASEAN Futsal Championship winners

Thailand
4th title
