= 2010 AFF Futsal Championship =

AFF Futsal Championship Vietnam 2010

Tournament details
- Host country: Vietnam
- City: Ho Chi Minh City
- Dates: 5–11 April
- Teams: 5 (from 1 confederation)
- Venue: 1 (in 1 host city)

Final positions
- Champions: Indonesia (1st title)
- Runners-up: Malaysia

Tournament statistics
- Matches played: 11
- Goals scored: 61 (5.55 per match)
- Top scorer(s): (Philippines) Misagh Bahadoran (6 goals)

The 2010 AFF Futsal Championship was held in Ho Chi Minh City, Vietnam from 5 to 11 April 2010.

Defending champions Thailand did not take part at this tournament as they opted to play in 2010 Thailand Five's Futsal Tournament which was being held around the same time in Udon Thani.

Hosts Vietnam having already qualified for the 2010 AFC Futsal Championship, were targeting top spot at this edition of the AFF Futsal Championship.

== Tournament ==
All times are Indochina Time (ICT) – UTC+7

=== Group stage ===
Team	Pld	W	D	L	GF	GA	GD	Pts
Indonesia	4	4	0	0	19	5	+14	12
Malaysia	4	3	0	1	9	9	0	9
Vietnam	4	2	0	2	13	5	+8	6
Philippines	4	1	0	3	8	15	−7	3
Myanmar	4	0	0	4	7	22	−15	0

5 April 2010
14:00

Malaysia	5 – 3	Philippines
Ali 13', 20'; Ruzaley 15'; Qaisar (?); Khairul (?)	Report	Zerrudo 10'; Bahadoran 10' (?)

Phu Tho Stadium, Ho Chi Minh City

5 April 2010
16:00

Vietnam	8 – 1	Myanmar
Truong Quoc Tuan 12', 19', 24'; Nguyen Hoang Giang 13'; Ha Bao Minh 30', 39'; Nguyen Quoc Bao 34'; Ngo Anh Dung 35'	Report	Htein Lin 7'

Phu Tho Stadium, Ho Chi Minh City

6 April 2010
14:00

Philippines	0 – 4	Vietnam
	Report	Nguyen Bao Quan (?), 23'; Nguyen Quoc Bao 18'; Huynh Ba Tuan 22'

Phu Tho Stadium, Ho Chi Minh City

6 April 2010
16:00

Indonesia	7 – 4	Myanmar
Hairul 4', 21', 35'; Socrates 11'; Deny 25'; Vennard 29'; Angga (?)	Report	Aung Thu 29'; Aye Min Win (?); Han Naing Soe 38'

Phu Tho Stadium, Ho Chi Minh City

7 April 2010
14:00

Indonesia	6 – 0	Malaysia
Vennard 3'; Indra 12', 27'; Hairul 27'; Sayan 28'; Jaelani (?)	Report

Phu Tho Stadium, Ho Chi Minh City

7 April 2010
16:00

Philippines	5 – 2	Myanmar
Bahadoran 18', 20', 34', 37'; Zerrudo 38'	Report	Htein Lin 3' unknown 30'

Phu Tho Stadium, Ho Chi Minh City

8 April 2010
14:00

Malaysia	2 – 0	Myanmar
Khairul (?), 21'	Report

Phu Tho Stadium, Ho Chi Minh City

8 April 2010
16:00

Vietnam	1 – 2	Indonesia
Huyhn Ba Tuan 18'	Report	Dang Phuoc Anh (?); Sayan (?)

Phu Tho Stadium, Ho Chi Minh City

9 April 2010
14:00

Philippines	0 – 4	Indonesia
	Report	Socrates 10', 32'; Bahadoran 22' (o.g.); Karismawan 27'

Phu Tho Stadium, Ho Chi Minh City

9 April 2010
16:00

Vietnam	0 – 2	Malaysia
	Report	Ruzaley 38'; S. Devandran (?)

Phu Tho Stadium, Kun Tu Lu Dun Stadium

=== Final ===
11 April 2010
16:00

Indonesia	5 – 0	Malaysia
Jaelani 8'; Vennard 23'; Deny 35'; Socrates 36'; Ali Haidar 37'	Report

Phu Tho Stadium, Ho Chi Minh City

== Winner ==
2010 ASEAN Futsal Championship winners

Indonesia
1st title

== Goalscorers ==
6 goals

- (Philippines) Misagh Bahadoran

4 goals

- (Indonesia) Hairul Saleh Ohorella
- (Indonesia) Socrates Matulessy

3 goals

- (Indonesia) Vennard Hutabarat
- (Malaysia) Mohd Khairul Effendy Mohd Bahrin
- (Vietnam) Truong Quoc Tuan

2 goals

- (Indonesia) Indra Kurnia
- (Indonesia) Sayan Karmadi
- (Indonesia) Jaelani Ladjanibi
- (Indonesia) Deny Handoyo
- (Malaysia) Mohd Ali Mahat
- (Malaysia) Ruzaley AbduL Aziz
- (Myanmar) Aye Min Win
- (Philippines) Ariel Zerrudo
- (Vietnam) Ha Bao Minh
- (Vietnam) Nguyen Bao Quan
- (Vietnam) Nguyen Quoc Bao
- (Vietnam) Huynh Ba Tuan

1 goal

- (Indonesia) Angga Saputra
- (Indonesia) Ali Haidar
- (Indonesia) Karismawan
- (Malaysia) Qaiser Abdul Kadir
- (Malaysia) S. Devandran
- (Myanmar) Htein Lin
- (Myanmar) Han Naing Soe
- (Myanmar) Aung Thu
- (Vietnam) Nguyen Hoang Giang
- (Vietnam) Ngo Anh Dung

Own goal

- (Philippines) Misagh Bahadoran (for Indonesia)
- (Vietnam) Dang Phuoc Anh (for Indonesia)
