= 2009 AFF Futsal Championship =

Tournament details
- Host country: Vietnam
- City: Ho Chi Minh City
- Dates: 8–14 June
- Teams: 7 (from 1 confederation)
- Venue: 1 (in 1 host city)

Final positions
- Champions: Thailand (7th title)
- Runners-up: Vietnam
- Third place: Indonesia
- Fourth place: Philippines

Tournament statistics
- Matches played: 13
- Goals scored: 129 (9.92 per match)
- Top scorer: (Indonesia) Sayan Karmadi (10 goals)
- Best player: (Thailand) Keattiyot Chalaemkhet

The 2009 AFF Futsal Championship was held in Ho Chi Minh City, Vietnam from 8 to 14 June 2009. It was hosted by Vietnam for the first time ever.

== Venue ==
Phú Thọ Gymnasium
Capacity: 6,000 seating
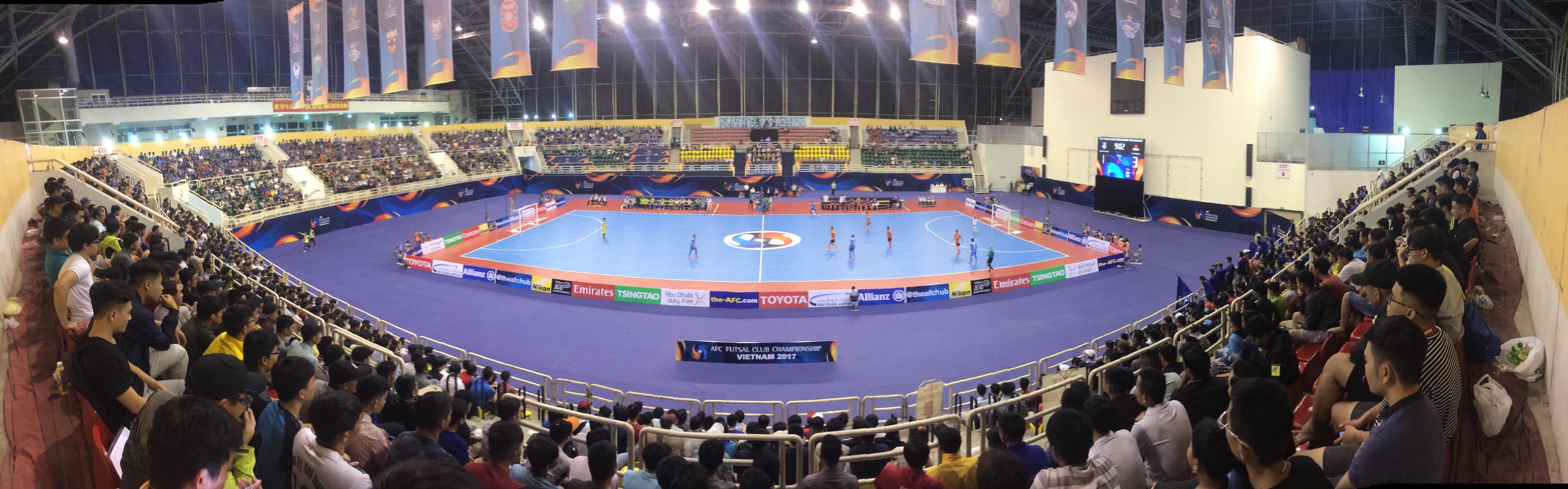

== Group stage ==
=== Group A ===
Team	Pld	W	D	L	GF	GA	GD	Pts
Thailand	3	3	0	0	26	11	+15	9
Indonesia	3	2	0	1	15	10	+5	6
Malaysia	3	1	0	2	8	14	-6	3
Myanmar	3	0	0	3	10	24	-14	0

2009-06-08
14:00

Malaysia	3 – 7	Indonesia
Addie Azwan Zainal 31'; Safer Mohamad 36', 37'	Report	Topas Pamungkas 5'; Sayan Karmadi 14', 22', 35'; Denny Handayo 18', 30'; Amril Daulay 40'

Phu Tho Gymnasium, Ho Chi Minh City

2009-06-08
16:00

Thailand	16 – 6	Myanmar
Keattiyot Chalaemkhet 5', 6', 12', 35'; Na-tee Thusiri 8', 20', 30'; Jirawat Sornwichian 13'; Jadet Pun Poem 16', 39'; Kritsada Wongkaeo 25'; Akkapol Kolmkciang 26', 28'; Lai Seu Luai 29' (o.g.); Suphawut Thueanklang 34', 36'; Jetsada Chudech 39'	Report	Kyaw zin Nyunt 23'; Zin Lin Aung 28', 31'

Phu Tho Gymnasium, Ho Chi Minh City

2009-06-09
16:00

Malaysia	3 – 7	Thailand
Mohd Fadhil Yusof 24'; Addie Azwan Zainal 28'; Qaiser Heshaam Kadir 35'	Report	Jirawat Sornwichian 14', 17'; Jetsada Chudech 25', 27'; Suphawut Thueanklang 25'; Na-tee Thusiri 28'; Kritsada Wongkaeo 33'

Phu Tho Gymnasium, Ho Chi Minh City

2009-06-09
18:00

Myanmar	4 – 6	Indonesia
Lai Ceu Luai 1', 10'; Ye Naung 27'; Zin Lin Aung 40'	Report	Denny Handoyo 6'; Sayan Karmadi 7', 33', 36'; Topas Pamungkas 18', 29'

Phu Tho Gymnasium, Ho Chi Minh City

2009-06-10
14:00

Myanmar	0 – 2	Malaysia
	Report	Addie Azwan Zainal 15' (pen.); Mohd Fadhil Yusoff 37'

Phu Tho Gymnasium, Ho Chi Minh City

2009-06-10
16:00

Indonesia	2 – 3	Thailand
Sayan Karmadi 22'; Afif Tamimy 25'	Report	Keattiyot Chalaemkhet 15', 21'; Jirawat Sornwichian 25'

Phu Tho Gymnasium, Ho Chi Minh City

=== Group B ===
Team	Pld	W	D	L	GF	GA	GD	Pts
Vietnam	2	2	0	0	24	1	+23	6
Philippines	2	1	0	1	10	5	+5	3
Timor-Leste	2	0	0	2	3	31	-28	0
Brunei (withdrew)	–	–	–	–	–	–	–	–

2009-06-08
18:00

Philippines	0 – 3	Vietnam
	Report	Huynh Ba Tuan 5'; Nguyen Quoc Binh 24'; Nguyen Bao 25'

Phu Tho Gymnasium, Ho Chi Minh City

2009-06-09
14:00

Timor-Leste	2 – 10	Philippines
Jose Vong 2', 20'	Report	Ali Go 2', 4'; Edward Mallari 2', 3'; Misagh Bahadoran 4', 5', 5', 10'; Jason de Jong 23', 24'

Phu Tho Gymnasium, Ho Chi Minh City

2009-06-10
16:00

Vietnam	21 – 1	Timor-Leste
Huynh Ba Tuan 2'; Ha Bao Minh 5'; Ngo Anh Dung 8', 19', 20', 22', 23', 33'; Huynh Dong Kha 9', 16', 19', 24', 27', 28'; Nguyen Quoc Binh 11'; Nguyen Bao Quan 12', 31', 35'; Pham Minh Giang 18', 32'; Nguyen Quoc Bao 38'	Report	Januario Ximenes 24'

Phu Tho Gymnasium, Ho Chi Minh City

== Knockout stage ==
Semi-finals
12 June – Ho Chi Minh City
Thailand	8
Philippines	2
12 June – Ho Chi Minh City
Vietnam (p)	3 (8)
Indonesia	3 (7)

Final
14 June – Ho Chi Minh City
Thailand	4
Vietnam	1
Third place
14 June – Ho Chi Minh City
Philippines	3
Indonesia	4

== Semi-finals ==
2009-06-12
15:00

Thailand	8 – 2	Philippines
Suphawut Thueanklang 6'; Na-Tee Thusiri 7'; Kritsada Wongkaeo 21'; Jirawat Sornwichian 22', 25', 28'; Jetsada Chudech 29'; Wiwat Thaijaruen 38'	Report	Peyman Nejadsafavi 19'; Misagh Bahadoran 39'

Phu Tho Gymnasium, Ho Chi Minh City

2009-06-12
17:00

Vietnam	3 – 3	Indonesia
Nguyen Quoc Binh 20'; Nguyen Bao Quan 27' (pen.), 32'	Report	Alfiansyah Nur 23'; Sayan Karmadi 24', 38' (pen.); Kurniawan (red card) 27'
Penalties
	8 – 7

Phu Tho Gymnasium, Ho Chi Minh City

== Third place play-off ==
2009-06-14
15:00

Philippines	3 – 4	Indonesia
Jason de Jong 5'; Misagh Bahadoran 27' (pen.) (No goal scorer specified in match report) 39'	Report	Denny Handoyo 15'; Indra Kurnia 22'; Taufiq Rahman 25'; Sayan Karmadi 28'

Phu Tho Gymnasium, Ho Chi Minh City

== Final ==
2009-06-14
17:00

Thailand	4 – 1	Vietnam
Suphawut Thueanklang 1'; Na-tee Thusiri 17', 26'; Nattawut Kongnimit 35'	Report	Ngo Anh Dung 38'

Phu Tho Gymnasium, Ho Chi Minh City
Attendance: 5,000

== Winners ==
2009 ASEAN Futsal Championship winners

Thailand
7th title

== Awards ==
Fair-Play Trophy: Indonesia
MVP: (Thailand) Keattiyot Chalaemkhet
Best Goalkeeper: (Vietnam) Dang Phuoc Anh
Best Goalscorer: Sayan Karmadi – 10 goals
