= 2024 Indonesia Futsal Super Cup =

Indonesia futsal competition

Tournament details
- Host country: Indonesia
- Cities: Sukoharjo, Central Java
- Dates: 13–15 Desember 2024
- Teams: 8
- Venue: GOR Bung Karno

Final positions
- Champions: Bintang Timur Surabaya; 1st title
- Runners-up: Black Steel
- Third place: Cosmo JNE
- Fourth place: Fafage Banua

The 2024 Indonesia Futsal Super Cup (also known as the 2024–25 3Second Indonesia Futsal Super Cup for sponsorship reasons) was the inaugural edition of the Indonesia Futsal Super Cup, held by the Indonesia Futsal Federation as a pre-season tournament for the 2024–25 Indonesia Pro Futsal League. It takes place in Sukoharjo, Central Java from 13 to 15 December 2024. The matches are played at GOR Bung Karno. It is contested annually between the top eight teams in the league table in 2023–24 season.

== Qualified teams ==
The qualified teams were the top eight teams in 2023–24 Indonesia Pro Futsal League. 8 teams will be divided into 2 pots (seeded and unseeded teams). Seeded and unseeded teams are determined from the 2023–24 PFL rankings. The draw of the final tournament was held on 22 November 2024 in Store 3Second Batu, East Java.

Pot 1 (Seeded Teams)	Pot 2 (Unseeded Teams)
1. Bintang Timur; 2. Black Steel; 3. Pangsuma; 4. Cosmo JNE	5. Unggul; 6. Fafage Banua; 7. Halus; 8. Moncongbulo

*Notes: Pendekar United (7th in PFL) withdraws from Indonesian futsal league, so the slot was replaced by Moncongbulo (9th in PFL).

== Venues ==
Sukoharjo
GOR Bung Karno
Capacity: –

== Matches ==
=== Bracket ===
Quarter-finals
13 December – GOR Bung Karno
Black Steel	4
Halus	2
13 December – GOR Bung Karno
Cosmo JNE	5
Moncongbulo	1
13 December – GOR Bung Karno
Bintang Timur	2
Unggul	0
13 December – GOR Bung Karno
Pangsuma	0
Fafage Banua	3

Semi-finals
14 December – GOR Bung Karno
Black Steel (p)	3 (4)
Cosmo JNE	3 (3)
14 December – GOR Bung Karno
Bintang Timur	4
Fafage Banua	3

Final
15 December – GOR Bung Karno
Black Steel	2
Bintang Timur	3
Third place
15 December – GOR Bung Karno
Cosmo JNE	1
Fafage Banua	0

=== Quarter-finals ===
13 December 2024
09:00 WIB (UTC +07)

Black Steel	4–2	Halus

GOR Bung Karno, Sukoharjo Regency

13 December 2024
14:00 WIB (UTC +07)

Cosmo JNE	5–1	Moncongbulo

GOR Bung Karno, Sukoharjo Regency

13 December 2024
16:00 WIB (UTC +07)

Bintang Timur	2–0	Unggul

GOR Bung Karno, Sukoharjo Regency

13 December 2024
18:00 WIB (UTC +07)

Pangsuma	0–3	Fafage Banua

GOR Bung Karno, Sukoharjo Regency

=== Semi-finals ===
14 December 2024
16:00 WIB (UTC +07)

Black Steel	3–3	Cosmo JNE
Penalties
	4–3

GOR Bung Karno, Sukoharjo Regency

14 December 2024
19:00 WIB (UTC +07)

Bintang Timur	4–3	Fafage Banua

GOR Bung Karno, Sukoharjo Regency

=== Third-place match ===
15 December 2024
16:00 WIB (UTC +07)

Cosmo JNE	1–0	Fafage Banua

GOR Bung Karno, Sukoharjo Regency

=== Final ===
15 December 2024
19:00 WIB (UTC +07)

Black Steel	2–3	Bintang Timur

GOR Bung Karno, Sukoharjo Regency

2024 Indonesia Futsal Super Cup
Bintang Timur
First title

== See also ==
- 2023–24 Indonesia Pro Futsal League
- 2024–25 Indonesia Pro Futsal League
- Indonesia Futsal Super Cup
- Indonesia Pro Futsal League
