= 2025–26 Indonesia Pro Futsal League =

Futsal competition in Indonesia

Indonesia Pro Futsal League
- Season: 2025–26
- Dates: 5 October 2025 – 24 May 2026 (regular season); 5 – 14 June 2026 (Final Four)
- Champions: Bintang Timur Surabaya; 5th PFL title
- Premiers: Unggul 3–4 Cosmo JNE (5 October 2025)
- Intercontinental Futsal Cup: Bintang Timur Surabaya
- Matches: 132
- Goals: 929 (7.04 per match)
- Best Player: Firman Adriansyah
- Top goalscorer: Wellington Pereira
- Total attendance: 6,855 (Final)
- All statistics correct as of 15 June 2026.

The 2025–26 Indonesia Pro Futsal League is the 18th season of the Indonesia Pro Futsal League competition held by the Indonesia Futsal Federation, as well as the tenth season of futsal competition under the name Professional Futsal League. The regular season started on 5 October 2025 and ended on 24 May 2026, followed by the Final Four from 5 to 14 June 2026.

Bintang Timur Surabaya are the defending champions, having won the previous season's title.

== Overview ==
=== Promotion and relegation (pre-season) ===
Twelve teams are competing in the league—the top ten teams from the previous season and the two teams promoted from the 2025 Nusantara Futsal League. Unlike the previous season, there is no relegation this season.

==== Teams promoted to Pro Futsal League ====
Asahan Allstar and Raybit FC were promoted from the 2025 Nusantara Futsal League and will be making their debut in the top division this season.

==== Teams relegated from Pro Futsal League ====
Tiga Radja United and Rafhely were relegated to the 2026 Nusantara Futsal League following the conclusion of the 2024–25 season.

=== Other changes ===
Sadakata United was officially acquired by Nanzaby Family FC. As a result, Nanzaby Family FC inherited Sadakata's slot and will be making their debut in the 2025–26 Pro Futsal League.

=== International qualification ===
For the first time in the league's history, the PFL champion will represent Indonesia—and Asia—at the 2026 Intercontinental Futsal Cup, to be held in Pato Branco, Paraná, Brazil, in November 2026 (14–19 November). The tournament is organised by Mundo do Futsal and is considered one of the most competitive club futsal competitions in the international calendar.

The 2026 edition will expand to six clubs for the first time, with matches played at the Arena Cláudio Petrycoski in Pato Branco. The confirmed participants are:

Club	Country	Qualification
Pato Futsal	Brazil	Host
Palma Futsal	Spain	Defending champion (2025)
Sporting CP	Portugal	2025–26 UEFA Futsal Champions League winner
Al-Ula SC	Saudi Arabia	2025–26 Saudi Futsal Federation Cup winner (Asia slot 1)
Bintang Timur Surabaya	Indonesia	PFL 2025–26 champion (Asia slot 2)
Carlos Barbosa	Brazil	2026 Copa Libertadores de Futsal winner

== Teams ==
=== Changes ===
The following teams have changed division since the end of the 2024–25 season.

==== To Pro Futsal League ====
Promoted from the Nusantara Futsal League

- Asahan Allstar
- Raybit FC

==== From Pro Futsal League ====
Relegated to the Nusantara Futsal League

- Tiga Radja United
- Rafhely

=== Name changes ===
- Sadakata United was officially acquired by Nanzaby Family FC. Nanzaby Family FC inherited the club's slot in the Pro Futsal League for the 2025–26 season.

=== Teams by province ===
Rank	Province	Number	Teams
1	Jakarta	4	Cosmo JNE, Halus, Kuda Laut Nusantara, and Raybit FC
2	East Java	2	Bintang Timur and Unggul
3	North Sumatra	1	Asahan Allstar
3	Riau Islands	1	Nanzaby Family
3	South Kalimantan	1	Fafage Banua
3	South Sulawesi	1	Moncongbulo
3	West Kalimantan	1	Pangsuma
3	(West Papua (province)) West Papua	1	Black Steel Papua

=== Location ===
Locations of non-Java based teams in the 2025–26 Indonesia Pro Futsal League
Locations of Java based teams in the 2025–26 Indonesia Pro Futsal League

Team	Location	2024–25 season
Bintang Timur	Surabaya	PFL Champion
Black Steel Papua	Manokwari	PFL Runner-up
Unggul	Malang	Semi-final (Elite 8)
Fafage Banua	Banjarmasin	Semi-final (Elite 8)
Moncongbulo	Makassar	Quarter-final (Elite 8)
Pangsuma	Pontianak	Quarter-final (Elite 8)
Nanzaby Family	Bintan	Replaced Sadakata United
Cosmo JNE	Jakarta	Quarter-final (Elite 8)
Kuda Laut Nusantara	Jakarta	9th in PFL
Halus	Jakarta	10th in PFL
Asahan Allstar^{↑}	Asahan	Promoted from NFL
Raybit FC^{↑}	Jakarta	Promoted from NFL

^{↑}	Promoted from the Nusantara Futsal League

== Foreign players ==
The Indonesia futsal federation has rules regarding foreign players. First, each team may register a maximum of 3 senior foreign players with 2 players can be sign from anywhere while another one must be a player from a top 10 AFC member nation according to the FIFA Futsal Ranking. An exception was given to Blacksteel's Rodrigo Matheus 'Tocha' due the team having signed a 5-year contract with him as an under-20 foreign players for the 2023–24 season. Second, teams can only field 2 foreign players on the pitch at the same time.

- Players named in **bold** indicates the player was registered during the mid-season transfer window.
- Former players named in italics are players that were out of squad or left the club within the season, after the pre-season transfer window, or in the mid-season transfer window, and at least had one appearance.

Team	Player 1	Player 2	Player 3	Former player
Asahan Allstar	—N/a	—N/a	—N/a	—N/a
Bintang Timur	(Brazil) Rian Gomes	**(Uzbekistan) Elbek Tulkinov**	—N/a	(Brazil) Marcus Gava
Blacksteel	(Brazil) Matheus Reis 'Dida'	(Brazil) Vinicius Costa	**(Brazil) Rodrigo Matheus 'Tocha'**	—N/a
Cosmo JNE	(Japan) Takeshi Higuchi	(Japan) Ruan Nakamatsu	—N/a	
Fafage Banua	(Brazil) Caio Almeida	(Brazil) Fellipe Huan	**(Uzbekistan) Ashurbek Tulkinov**	(Iran) Ali Abedin
Halus	—N/a	—N/a	—N/a	—N/a
Kuda Laut Nusantara	(Japan) **Hayao Yamagata**	—N/a	—N/a	—N/a
Moncongbulo	—N/a	—N/a	—N/a	—N/a
Nanzaby Family	(Brazil) Joao Ortiz	(Brazil) Toninho	—N/a	—N/a
Pangsuma	(Brazil) Daniel Alves	(Azerbaijan) Felipe Santos	—N/a	—N/a
Raybit	—N/a	—N/a	—N/a	—N/a
Unggul	(Venezuela) Andres Josue Teran	(Brazil) Wellington Perreira	—N/a	(Afghanistan) Farzad Mahmoodi

Notes:

1. Exception

=== Foreign players by confederation ===
Foreign players by confederation
AFC	Japan (3), Uzbekistan (2)
CAF	—N/a
CONCACAF	—N/a
CONMEBOL	Brazil (10), Venezuela (1)
OFC	—N/a
UEFA	Azerbaijan (1)

== Schedule and venues ==
Nine venues across nine cities are hosting matches in this season's league.

=== Regular series ===
==== Round 1 ====
Round	Date	Venue		
Round	Date	Sports Center	Location	Province
I	4–5 October 2025	Manahan Indoor Sports Hall	Surakarta	Central Java
II	11–12 October 2025	Ken Arok Sports Hall	Malang	East Java
III	18–19 October 2025	Nambo Jaya Sport Center	Tangerang	Banten
IV	25–26 October 2025	Nambo Jaya Sport Center	Tangerang	Banten
V	8–9 November 2025	Nambo Jaya Sport Center	Tangerang	Banten
VI	15–16 November 2025	Nambo Jaya Sport Center	Tangerang	Banten
VII	22–23 November 2025	Nambo Jaya Sport Center	Tangerang	Banten

==== Round 2 ====
Round	Date	Venue		
Round	Date	Sports Center	Location	Province
VIII	28–29 March 2026	Babussalam Sports Hall	Banjarbaru	South Kalimantan
IX	18–19 April 2026	UNJ Sports Hall	Jakarta	Jakarta
X	25–26 April 2026	Istora Papua Bangkit	Jayapura	Papua
XI	2–3 May 2026	Sudiang Sports Hall	Makassar	South Sulawesi
XII	9–10 May 2026	UNESA Sports Hall	Surabaya	East Java
XIII	16–17 May 2026	Ken Arok Sports Hall	Malang	East Java
XIV	23–24 May 2026	Nambo Jaya Sport Center	Tangerang	Banten

=== Final Four ===
Round	Date		Venue		
Round	First leg	Second leg	Sports Center	Location	Province
Semifinals	5 June 2026	7 June 2026	UNY Sports Hall	Yogyakarta	Special Region of Yogyakarta
Finals	12 June 2026	14 June 2026	UNY Sports Hall	Yogyakarta	Special Region of Yogyakarta

== Regular Series ==
In the regular series, twelve teams compete in a full round-robin format. The top four teams advance to the Final Four.

=== Standings ===
Pos	Team	Pld	W	D	L	GF	GA	GD	Pts	Qualification or relegation
1	Fafage Banua	22	18	1	3	94	46	+48	55	Qualified for the Final Four and the Futsal Super Cup
2	Black Steel Papua	22	17	3	2	103	44	+59	54	Qualified for the Final Four and the Futsal Super Cup
3	Bintang Timur	22	17	1	4	117	39	+78	52	Qualified for the Final Four and the Futsal Super Cup
4	Cosmo JNE	22	14	4	4	85	34	+51	46	Qualified for the Final Four and the Futsal Super Cup
5	Pangsuma	22	14	3	5	114	65	+49	45	Qualified for the Futsal Super Cup
6	Unggul	22	13	2	7	118	70	+48	41	Qualified for the Futsal Super Cup
7	Nanzaby Family	22	7	3	12	62	84	−22	24	Qualified for the Futsal Super Cup
8	Moncongbulo	22	6	2	14	59	87	−28	20	Qualified for the Futsal Super Cup
9	Kuda Laut Nusantara	22	4	4	14	50	94	−44	16	
10	Halus	22	3	3	16	43	104	−61	12	
11	Asahan Allstar	22	1	6	15	55	118	−63	9	
12	Raybit	22	1	2	19	29	144	−115	5	

Updated to match(es) played on 24 May 2026. Source: Flashscore

Notes:

- No relegation this season; the league confirmed all 12 clubs would remain in the top flight for the following season.

=== Result ===
Home \ Away	ASA	BIN	BLA	COS	FAF	HAL	KLN	MON	NAN	PAN	RAY	UNG
Asahan Allstar		3–0	2–5	2–3	0–8	4–4	2–8	1–3	3–3	3–4	8–1	1–10
Bintang Timur	9–1		2–4	0–2	4–5	5–1	7–0	6–0	4–1	2–4	13–0	3–1
Black Steel Papua	8–2	1–8		2–1	3–1	3–1	10–3	3–2	4–1	3–3	10–0	5–1
Cosmo JNE	9–4	0–0	0–1		0–0	10–1	4–4	5–2	4–0	3–3	8–1	2–1
Fafage Banua	6–1	1–3	5–2	3–2		5–0	2–1	2–1	7–3	5–4	4–0	1–7
Halus	4–4	1–5	0–3	3–8	1–6		1–1	1–4	3–2	0–7	5–3	2–5
Kuda Laut Nusantara	3–2	4–7	1–5	2–1	0–7	2–3		3–3	1–4	2–5	4–4	1–7
Moncongbulo	0–0	2–8	4–8	0–6	2–3	7–2	3–2		3–4	3–6	3–0	1–6
Nanzaby Family	4–4	4–5	1–4	0–4	3–5	4–3	5–1	4–2		1–9	3–1	5–5
Pangsuma	8–4	2–1	3–3	2–4	5–7	7–0	4–1	7–4	4–3		9–0	8–4
Raybit	4–4	0–12	1–10	0–5	3–5	4–2	3–5	1–6	1–4	3–6		0–8
Unggul	6–2	4–6	3–3	3–4	3–7	6–4	5–1	8–5	7–3	7–5	11–1	

Updated to match(es) played on 24 May 2026. Source: PFL 2025–26
Legend: Blue = home team win; Yellow = draw; Red = away team win.

== Final Four ==
The Final Four is held at the Yogyakarta State University Sports Hall, Yogyakarta, from 5 to 14 June 2026. Each round is played over two legs using a match-point system: each leg awards one point to the winner; if a leg ends level, the higher-ranked team in the regular series receives the point. If points are tied at 1–1 after two legs, the score is reset to 1–1 and the tie is decided by extra time, and if still level, a penalty shoot-out.

=== Bracket ===
Semi-finals
1	Fafage Banua	0	0
4	Cosmo JNE	1	1
2	Black Steel Papua	0	1
3	Bintang Timur	1	1^{p}

Finals
4	Cosmo JNE	0	0
3	Bintang Timur	1	1

^{p} Won on penalty shoot-out

=== Semi-finals ===
==== Semifinal 1 ====
5 June 2026
18:30 WIB

Fafage Banua (1)	2–3	Cosmo JNE (4)
Irfan Maulana 15'; Fellipe Huan 39'		Israr Megantara 26'; Reza Gunawan 34'; Andri Kustiawan 38'

UNY Sports Hall, Yogyakarta
7 June 2026
15:00 WIB

Cosmo JNE (4)	2–1	Fafage Banua (1)
Aji Satria 34'; Andri Kustiawan 36'		Fellipe Huan 38'

UNY Sports Hall, Yogyakarta
Cosmo JNE advance to final – match points: 2–0

==== Semifinal 2 ====
5 June 2026
15:00 WIB

Black Steel Papua (2)	0–2	Bintang Timur (3)
		Rio Pangestu 32'; Samuel Eko 39'

UNY Sports Hall, Yogyakarta
7 June 2026
18:30 WIB

Bintang Timur (3)	1–7	Black Steel Papua (2)
Ardiansyah Runtuboy 24'		Vinicius Costa 2', 30'; Ronal Drion Bonay 13'; Wendy Brian Ick 20'; Adityas Priambudi 20'; Ardiansyah Nur 32'; Rodrigo Matheus 32'

UNY Sports Hall, Yogyakarta
Match points: 1–1 (score reset to 1–1 → extra time: 0–0 → penalty shoot-out). Bintang Timur advance to final (won 5–4 on penalties)

=== Finals ===
12 June 2026
18:30 WIB

Cosmo JNE (4)	2–4	Bintang Timur (3)
Reza Gunawan 19'; Andi Umayyah 25'		Rian Gomez 9'; Samuel Eko 14'; Rian Gomez 26'; Samuel Eko 34'

UNY Sports Hall, Yogyakarta
14 June 2026
18:30 WIB

Bintang Timur (3)	4–3	Cosmo JNE (4)
Ardiansyah Runtuboy 31'; Firman Ardiansyah 32' (pen.); Samuel Eko 38'; Ahmad Habibie 39'		Ruan Nakamatsu 18'; Reza Gunawan 22'; Andri Kustiawan 30'

UNY Sports Hall, Yogyakarta
Bintang Timur champion – match points: 2–0

== Awards ==
2025-2026 Indonesia Pro Futsal League Awards:

- Champion: Bintang Timur Surabaya
- Runner-up: Cosmo JNE FC
- Best Player: Firman Adriansyah
- Top Scorer: Wellington Pereira (28 gol/Unggul FC Malang)
- Best Goalkeeper: Ahmad Habiebie
- Best Young Player: Revan Revian ‘Epoy’ (Cosmo JNE FC)
- Best Head Coach: Motonori Baba (Cosmo JNE FC)
- Best Referee: Wahyu Wicaksono
- Fair Play Team: Asahan Futsal

== See also ==
- Indonesia Pro Futsal League
- 2025–26 Nusantara Futsal League
- 2026 Intercontinental Futsal Cup
