= 2024–25 Indonesia Pro Futsal League =

Futsal competition in Indonesia

Indonesia Pro Futsal League
- Season: 2024–25
- Dates: 21 December 2024 – 22 June 2025 (regular season); 4 – 7 July 2025 (playoff elite 8)
- Champions: Bintang Timur Surabaya; 4th PFL title
- Relegated: Rafhely; Tiga Radja United
- Matches: 132
- Goals: 837 (6.34 per match)
- Best player: Ardiansyah Nur
- Top goalscorer: Evan Soumilena (32 goals)
- Total attendance: 26.592 (Playoffs)
- All statistics correct as of 27 July 2025.

The 2024–25 Indonesia Pro Futsal League, was the 17th season of the Indonesia Pro Futsal League competition held by the Indonesia Futsal Federation, as well as the ninth season of futsal competition under the name Professional Futsal League. The regular season started on 21 December 2024 and scheduled to end on 22 June 2025.

Bintang Timur Surabaya are the defending champions and retained their title after beating Black Steel 9–6 on aggregates.

== Overview ==
=== Promotion and relegation (pre-season) ===
Twelve teams is competing in the league—the top ten teams from the previous season and the two teams promoted from the 2023–24 Nusantara Futsal League.

==== Teams promoted to Pro Futsal League ====
Kuda Laut Nusantara and Rafhely two teams were promoted and advanced to the final round of the Nusantara Futsal League after defeating their respective opponents in the semifinals on 17 August 2024 with Kuda Laut Nusantara defeating Juku Eja and Rafhely won over Merador. This season marks the debut season for both teams to compete in the top division.

==== Teams relegated from Pro Futsal League ====
On 22 July 2024, Giga Metro became the first team to be relegated with points that could not catch up with Sadakata United. Giga were relegated after spending 7 seasons in the top division.

On 3 August 2024, Kinantan became the second and final team to be relegated despite winning against Giga in the last matchweek. This was because Sadakata United held Halus to a draw and Kinantan immediately returned to the second division after spending one season in the top division.

=== Other changes ===
On 11 November 2024, Pendekar United decided to withdraw from the Pro Futsal League after spending four seasons in the league. The election of their owner as vice chairman of the Indonesian Futsal Federation and avoiding any conflict of interest were the reasons for the resignation. Meanwhile, Tiga Radja United on 14 November 2024 joined the league to fill the slot left by Pendekar United.

== Teams ==
=== Changes ===
The following teams have changed division since the end of 2023–24 season.

==== To Pro Futsal League ====
Promoted from the Nusantara Futsal League

- Kuda Laut Nusantara
- Rafhely

New team

- Tiga Radja United

==== From Pro Futsal League ====
Relegated to the Nusantara Futsal League

- Kinantan
- Giga Metro

Withdrew team

- Pendekar United

=== Name changes ===
- Kancil WHW changed its name to Pangsuma

=== Teams by province ===
| Rank | Province | Number | Teams |
|---|---|---|---|
| 1 | Jakarta | 3 | Cosmo JNE, Halus, and Kuda Laut Nusantara |
| 2 | East Java | 2 | Bintang Timur and Unggul |
| 3 | Aceh | 1 | Sadakata United |
| 3 | South Kalimantan | 1 | Fafage Banua |
| 3 | South Sulawesi | 1 | Moncongbulo |
| 3 | West Java | 1 | Tiga Radja United |
| 3 | West Kalimantan | 1 | Pangsuma |
| 3 | (West Papua (province)) West Papua | 1 | Black Steel |
| 3 | West Sumatra | 1 | Rafhely |

=== Location ===
Locations of non-Java based teams in the 2024–25 Indonesia Pro Futsal League
Locations of Java based teams in the 2024–25 Indonesia Pro Futsal League

| Team | Location | 2023–24 season |
|---|---|---|
| Bintang Timur | Surabaya | PFL Champion |
| Black Steel | Manokwari | PFL Runner-up |
| Cosmo JNE | Jakarta | 4th in PFL |
| Fafage Banua | Banjarmasin | 6th in PFL |
| Halus | Jakarta | 8th in PFL |
| Kuda Laut Nusantara^{↑} | Jakarta | NFL Champion |
| Moncongbulo | Gowa | 9th in PFL |
| Pangsuma | Pontianak | PFL Third place |
| Rafhely^{↑} | Padang | NFL Runner-up |
| Sadakata United | Subulussalam | 10th in PFL |
| Tiga Radja United | Bandung | —N/a |
| Unggul | Malang | 5th in PFL |

| ^{↑} | Promoted from the Nusantara Futsal League |

=== Personnel and kits ===
| Team | Head coach | Captain | Kit manufacturer | Main kit sponsor | Other kit sponsor(s) |
|---|---|---|---|---|---|
| Bintang Timur | (Spain national football team) Diego Ríos | (Indonesia national football team) M. Iqbal Iskandar | (Indonesia) Noij | Baskhara | List: Front: Mitra Keluarga, Savior; Back: Pocari Sweat; Sleeves: None; Shorts: None |
| Black Steel | (Brazil national football team) Sergio Lacerda | (Indonesia national football team) Ardiansyah Nur | (Thailand) Imane | Freeport Indonesia | List: Front: Gemooy, Hydro Coco, Mitra Keluarga, Pertamina; Back: None; Sleeves: Cleo, Jonas Medical Sport; Shorts: None |
| Cosmo JNE | (Japan national football team) Motonori Baba | (Indonesia national football team) Andri Kustiawan | (Indonesia) Mills | JNE Express | List: Front: Avicenna; Back: Hydro Coco, Tifosi Sport Center; Sleeves: Columbia Asia Hospital; Shorts: None |
| Fafage Banua | (Indonesia national football team) Sayan Karmadi | (Indonesia national football team) Sunni Rizky | (Thailand) Imane | HNR Corp | List: Front: Cleo, PT. TRM; Back: EMC Healthcare, Hair Nerds Studio, Jonas Medical Sport, Pocari Sweat; Sleeves: Mansport, Sate Taichan Bengawan; Shorts: None |
| Halus | (Indonesia national football team) Yolla Hendro | (Indonesia national football team) Abdul Rahman Nawawi | (Indonesia) Ghanior | None | List: Front: None; Back: Elite Physio & Sports Massage, Hydro Coco, Jonas Medical Sport, MY Futsal; Sleeves: None; Shorts: None |
| Kuda Laut Nusantara | (Indonesia national football team) Irman Firmana | (Indonesia national football team) Marvin Alexa | (Indonesia) RANKSPORTS | None | List: Front: None; Back: None; Sleeves: Gocok; Shorts: None |
| Moncongbulo | (Indonesia national football team) Azhar Rahman | (Indonesia national football team) Ilham Ramadhyan | (Indonesia) Eazywear | Putra Kaisar Group | List: Front: Cheers, Haphap Sport; Back: dat; Sleeves: Mansport, MY Futsal, Seventyfour Co; Shorts: None |
| Pangsuma | (Indonesia national football team) Wahyu Kocoy | (Indonesia national football team) Dias Riyansyah | (Indonesia) Classiconesia | WHW | List: Front: Mind ID, Pertamina; Back: Honda, Larina, Mantra Space, VOKRAF; Sleeves: Jonas Medical Sport, Manchief; Shorts: None |
| Rafhely | (Malaysia national football team) Qusmaini Noor | (Indonesia national football team) Ade Andyka | (Indonesia) Ortuseight | None | List: Front: None; Back: None; Sleeves: Bank Nagari; Shorts: None |
| Sadakata United | (Indonesia national football team) Fandy Butar-butar | (Indonesia national football team) Rama Adithia | (Indonesia) Manuver Sport | Kiki Bintang Market | List: Front: Giga Futsal, Jonas Medical Sport; Back: None; Sleeves: LEX Entitas Law Firm; Shorts: None |
| Tiga Radja United | (Indonesia national football team) Joni Asmara | (Indonesia national football team) Rahmatullah | (Indonesia) Arafs Apparel | RGR | List: Front: Noora, Se'Indonesia; Back: None; Sleeves: AP Creative; Shorts: None |
| Unggul | (Portugal national football team) João Almeida | (Indonesia national football team) Iksani Fajar | (Indonesia) Momosays | Unggul Sports Center | List: Front: AQUA, Majoo; Back: Hydro Coco; Sleeves: None; Shorts: None |

1. Caretaker.
2. Apparel made by club.

=== Coaching changes ===
| Team | Outgoing head coach | Manner of departure | Date of vacancy | Position in table | Replaced by | Date of appointment |
|---|---|---|---|---|---|---|
| Kuda Laut Nusantara | (Indonesia) Andri Irawan | Sacked | 1 March 2025 | 9th | (Indonesia) Irman Firmana (interim) | 13 April 2025 |

== Foreign players ==
The Indonesia futsal federation has rules regarding foreign players. First, each team may register a maximum of 2 senior foreign players. The under-20 foreign players rule no longer applied this season. Exceptions are given to Black Steel due the team having signed a 5-year contract with their respective under-20 foreign players last season.

Second, every team can now sign senior foreign players who have not played for their national team and teams can only field 3 foreign players on the pitch at the same time consisted of 2 senior players and 1 under-20 players for Black Steel.

- Players named in **bold** indicates the player was registered during the mid-season transfer window.
- Former players named in italics are players that were out of squad or left the club within the season, after the pre-season transfer window, or in the mid-season transfer window, and at least had one appearance.

| Team | Player 1 | Player 2 | Player 3 | Former player |
|---|---|---|---|---|
| Bintang Timur | (Brazil) Washington Luiz Gabriel 'Pepita' | (Brazil) Gilvan Norberto Ferreira | —N/a | |
| Black Steel | (Brazil) Matheus Reis 'Dida' | (Brazil) Vinicius Costa | (Brazil) Rodrigo Matheus 'Tocha' | |
| Cosmo JNE | (Japan) Seiya Shimizu | (Japan) Ruan Nakamatsu | —N/a | |
| Fafage Banua | (Brazil) Henrique di Maria | (Brazil) Diego Rodrigo | —N/a | |
| Halus | | | —N/a | |
| Kuda Laut Nusantara | | | —N/a | |
| Moncongbulo | | | —N/a | |
| Pangsuma | (Brazil) Daniel Alves | (Azerbaijan) Felipe Santos | —N/a | |
| Rafhely | | | —N/a | |
| Sadakata United | | | —N/a | |
| Tiga Radja United | | | —N/a | |
| Unggul | (Venezuela) Andres Josue Teran | (Brazil) Wellington Perreira | —N/a | (Brazil) Guilherme Rossatto |

Notes:

1. Under-20 foreign player

=== Foreign players by confederation ===
Foreign players by confederation
| AFC | Japan (2) |
| CAF | |
| CONCACAF | |
| CONMEBOL | Brazil (9), Venezuela (1) |
| OFC | |
| UEFA | Azerbaijan (1) |

== Schedule and venue ==
Locations of non-Java based venues in the 2024–25 Indonesia Pro Futsal League
Locations of Java based venues in the 2024–25 Indonesia Pro Futsal League

.

The regular season started on 21 December 2024 and scheduled to end on 22 June 2025. FFI held the first series at GOR Bung Karno, Sukoharjo, which was the venue for the pre-season tournament, the 2024 3Second Futsal Super Cup. Futsal Nation Cup is also scheduled by FFI to take place mid-season.

Note: Schedule and venue may change.

=== Regular series ===
| Round | Date | Venue | | | Host |
| Round | Date | Sports Center | Location | Province | Host |
|---|---|---|---|---|---|
| I | 21–22 December 2024 | Bung Karno | Sukoharjo | Central Java | Indonesia Futsal Federation |
| II | 11–12 January 2025 | Ken Arok | Malang | East Java | Unggul |
| III | 18–19 January 2025 | Babussalam | Banjarbaru | South Kalimantan | Fafage Banua |
| III | 25–26 January 2025 | Bung Tomo | Surabaya | East Java | Bintang Timur |
| V | 8–9 February 2025 | Sudiang | Makassar | South Sulawesi | Moncongbulo |
| VI | 15–16 February 2025 | Istora Papua Bangkit | Jayapura | Papua | Black Steel |
| VII | 22–23 February 2025 | Istora Papua Bangkit | Jayapura | Papua | Black Steel |
| VIII | 3–4 May 2025 | Harapan Bangsa | Banda Aceh | Aceh | Sadakata United |
| IX | 10–11 May 2025 | Universitas Negeri Jakarta | East Jakarta | Jakarta | Cosmo JNE |
| X | 17–18 May 2025 | GBK Basketball Hall | Central Jakarta | Jakarta | Halus |
| XI | 24–25 May 2025 | Pangsuma | Pontianak | West Kalimantan | Pangsuma |
| XII | 31 May–1 June 2025 | Pangsuma | Pontianak | West Kalimantan | Pangsuma |
| XIII | 14–15 June 2025 | Ken Arok | Malang | East Java | Unggul |
| XIV | 21–22 June 2025 | Universitas Negeri Surabaya | Surabaya | East Java | Bintang Timur |

=== Play-off Elite 8 ===
| Round | Date | | Venue | | |
| Round | First leg | Second leg | Sports Center | Location | Province |
|---|---|---|---|---|---|
| Quarterfinals | 4 & 6 July 2025 | 11 & 13 July 2025 | Among Rogo | Yogyakarta | Yogyakarta |
| Semifinals | 18 July 2025 | 20 July 2025 | Among Rogo | Yogyakarta | Yogyakarta |
| Finals | 25 July 2025 | 27 July 2025 | Among Rogo | Yogyakarta | Yogyakarta |

== Regular Series ==
In the regular series, twelve teams will compete in a double round-robin format. The top eight teams will qualified to the play-off elite 8, while the bottom two teams will be relegated to the Nusantara Futsal League.

=== Standings ===
| Pos | Team | Pld | W | D | L | GF | GA | GD | Pts | Qualification or relegation |
|---|---|---|---|---|---|---|---|---|---|---|
| 1 | Bintang Timur | 22 | 17 | 2 | 3 | 103 | 34 | +69 | 53 | Qualification for the Play-off Elite 8 |
| 2 | Fafage Banua | 22 | 15 | 5 | 2 | 86 | 36 | +50 | 50 | Qualification for the Play-off Elite 8 |
| 3 | Black Steel | 22 | 15 | 4 | 3 | 89 | 46 | +43 | 49 | Qualification for the Play-off Elite 8 |
| 4 | Unggul | 22 | 13 | 4 | 5 | 95 | 68 | +27 | 43 | Qualification for the Play-off Elite 8 |
| 5 | Pangsuma | 22 | 11 | 6 | 5 | 105 | 50 | +55 | 39 | Qualification for the Play-off Elite 8 |
| 6 | Cosmo JNE | 22 | 11 | 4 | 7 | 77 | 44 | +33 | 37 | Qualification for the Play-off Elite 8 |
| 7 | Sadakata United | 22 | 8 | 5 | 9 | 69 | 76 | −7 | 29 | Qualification for the Play-off Elite 8 |
| 8 | Moncongbulo | 22 | 6 | 2 | 14 | 49 | 87 | −38 | 20 (Note: Tied on head-to-head points. Ranked on head-to-head goal difference: Moncongbulo +3, Kuda Laut Nusantara –3.) | Qualification for the Play-off Elite 8 |
| 9 | Kuda Laut Nusantara | 22 | 5 | 5 | 12 | 47 | 63 | −16 | 20 | |
| 10 | Halus | 22 | 4 | 4 | 14 | 44 | 95 | −51 | 16 | |
| 11 | Rafhely (R) | 22 | 4 | 2 | 16 | 44 | 98 | −54 | 14 | Relegation to Nusantara Futsal League |
| 12 | Tiga Radja United (R) | 22 | 1 | 1 | 20 | 29 | 140 | −111 | 4 | Relegation to Nusantara Futsal League |

Source: PFL 2024–25
Rules for classification: 1) Points; 2) Head-to-head points; 3) Head-to-head goal difference; 4) Head-to-head goals scored; 5) Goal difference; 6) Goals scored; 7) Fair-play points; 8) Draw.
(R) Relegated

=== Result ===
| Home \ Away | BIN | BLA | COS | FAF | HAL | KLN | MON | PGS | RAF | SAD | TRU | UNG |
|---|---|---|---|---|---|---|---|---|---|---|---|---|
| Bintang Timur | | 3–0 | 1–4 | 2–3 | 5–1 | 2–2 | 5–0 | 3–2 | 7–0 | 6–3 | 7–0 | 6–1 |
| Black Steel | 2–2 | | 4–1 | 1–1 | 8–1 | 4–1 | 8–1 | 3–3 | 2–1 | 5–0 | 5–0 | 7–3 |
| Cosmo JNE | 3–4 | 2–1 | | 1–1 | 2–2 | 4–1 | 0–4 | 0–2 | 4–2 | 9–0 | 11–1 | 4–5 |
| Fafage Banua | 3–4 | 3–3 | 2–1 | | 7–1 | 1–0 | 4–1 | 3–3 | 6–0 | 6–1 | 8–4 | 1–2 |
| Halus | 2–9 | 1–2 | 0–0 | 0–5 | | 2–2 | 8–2 | 0–4 | 3–3 | 0–4 | 4–1 | 3–4 |
| Kuda Laut Nusantara | 2–5 | 1–2 | 0–5 | 0–5 | 3–4 | | 2–6 | 1–4 | 1–1 | 0–2 | 4–0 | 3–2 |
| Moncongbulo | 0–6 | 1–4 | 1–5 | 2–3 | 7–2 | 3–4 | | 0–6 | 2–4 | 2–2 | 1–0 | 1–7 |
| Pangsuma | 2–1 | 5–6 | 4–4 | 1–5 | 10–1 | 2–2 | 7–1 | | 8–1 | 2–2 | 11–0 | 4–4 |
| Rafhely | 0–5 | 4–8 | 2–6 | 1–3 | 2–5 | 1–3 | 3–6 | 0–9 | | 4–3 | 5–4 | 1–4 |
| Sadakata United | 0–8 | 6–3 | 1–2 | 3–5 | 4–3 | 4–4 | 2–4 | 2–1 | 4–3 | | 12–0 | 2–2 |
| Tiga Radja United | 1–6 | 3–5 | 2–6 | 1–7 | 4–1 | 0–8 | 2–2 | 3–12 | 1–3 | 1–6 | | 1–10 |
| Unggul | 3–6 | 3–6 | 4–3 | 4–4 | 7–0 | 4–3 | 3–2 | 8–3 | 4–3 | 5–5 | 6–0 | |

Updated to match(es) played on 17 May 2025. Source: PFL 2024–25
Legend: Blue = home team win; Yellow = draw; Red = away team win.

== Play-off Elite 8 ==
In the play-off elite 8, teams played against each other over two legs. If teams are tied after two legs, the higher-placed team advances.

=== Bracket ===
Quarter-finals
1 | Bintang Timur | 7 | 4 | 11
8 | Moncongbulo | 0 | 0 | 0
4 | Unggul | 5 | 3 | 8
5 | Pangsuma | 3 | 3 | 6
2 | Fafage | 5 | 7 | 12
7 | Sadakata | 0 | 0 | 0
3 | Black Steel | 1 | 4 | 5
6 | Cosmo JNE | 0 | 3 | 3

Semi-finals
1 | Bintang Timur | 7 | 5 | 12
4 | Unggul | 3 | 4 | 7
2 | Fafage | 1 | 2 | 3
3 | Black Steel | 4 | 6 | 10

Finals
1 | Bintang Timur | 2 | 7 | 9
3 | Black Steel | 2 | 4 | 6

=== Quarter-finals ===
4 July 2025
16:00 UTC+7

| Unggul | 5–3 | Pangsuma |

Among Rogo Sports Hall, Yogyakarta
11 July 2025
16:00 UTC+7

| Pangsuma | 3–3 | Unggul |

Among Rogo Sports Hall, Yogyakarta

4 July 2025
19:00 UTC+7

| Black Steel | 1–0 | Cosmo JNE |

Among Rogo Sports Hall, Yogyakarta
11 July 2025
19:00 UTC+7

| Cosmo JNE | 3–4 | Black Steel |

Among Rogo Sports Hall, Yogyakarta

6 July 2025
16:00 UTC+7

| Fafage Banua | 5–0 | Sadakata United |

Among Rogo Sports Hall, Yogyakarta
13 July 2025
16:00 UTC+7

| Sadakata United | 0–7 | Fafage Banua |

Among Rogo Sports Hall, Yogyakarta

6 July 2025
19:00 UTC+7

| Bintang Timur | 7–0 | Moncongbulo |

Among Rogo Sports Hall, Yogyakarta
13 July 2025
19:00 UTC+7

| Moncongbulo | 0–4 | Bintang Timur |

Among Rogo Sports Hall, Yogyakarta

=== Semi-finals ===
18 July 2025
19:00 UTC+7

| Fafage Banua | 1–4 | Black Steel |

Among Rogo Sports Hall, Yogyakarta
20 July 2025
19:00 UTC+7

| Black Steel | 6–2 | Fafage Banua |

Among Rogo Sports Hall, Yogyakarta

18 July 2025
16:00 UTC+7

| Bintang Timur | 7–3 | Unggul |

Among Rogo Sports Hall, Yogyakarta
20 July 2025
16:00 UTC+7

| Unggul | 4–5 | Bintang Timur |

Among Rogo Sports Hall, Yogyakarta

=== Third place play-offs ===
25 July 2025
16:00 UTC+7

| Unggul | 5–1 | Fafage Banua |

Among Rogo Sports Hall, Yogyakarta
27 July 2025
16:00 UTC+7

| Fafage Banua | 4–5 | Unggul |

Among Rogo Sports Hall, Yogyakarta

=== Finals ===
25 July 2025
19:00 UTC+7

| Bintang Timur | 2–2 | Black Steel |
|---|---|---|
| Rio Pangestu 12'54"; Rizki Xavier 33'44" | Report | Ardiansyah Nur 19'56"; Vinicius 37'03" |

Among Rogo Sports Hall, Yogyakarta
27 July 2025
19:00 UTC+7

| Black Steel | 4–7 | Bintang Timur |
|---|---|---|
| Vinicius 9'11", 39'41"; Brian Ick 30'30", 39'1" | Report | Iqbal 1'5"; Syauqi 2'53"; Pepita 11'51", 15'51" (pen.); Reza Gunawan 23'15", 32'55"; Runtuboy 32'22" |

Among Rogo Sports Hall, Yogyakarta

== See also ==
- Indonesia Pro Futsal League
- 2024–25 Nusantara Futsal League
