= Futsal at the 2025 SEA Games – Men's team squads =

List of footballers

The men's futsal tournament at the 2025 SEA Games was held from 15 to 19 December 2025. The five national teams involved in the tournament were required to register a squad of 14 players, including two goalkeepers. Only players in these squads were eligible to take part in the tournament.

The age listed for each player is on 15 December 2025, the first day of the tournament. The numbers of caps and goals listed for each player do not include any matches played after the start of the tournament. The club listed is the club for which the player last played a competitive match prior to the tournament. (Note: This is the club a player was last able to play for during the previous season in the event a player did not play a competitive match.) The nationality for each club reflects the national association (not the league) to which the club is affiliated. A flag is included for coaches who are of a different nationality than their own national team.

== Teams ==
=== Thailand ===
Head coach: (Spain) Miguel Rodrigo

=== Indonesia ===
Head coach: (Spain) Héctor Souto

The Indonesia Futsal Federation first announced 20-men preliminary squad to participate in the national team's training camp on 17 November 2025. The final 14-men squad was announced on 12 December 2025.

No.	Pos.	Player	Date of birth (age)	Caps	Goals	Club
	GK	Ahmad Habiebie	21 June 2000 (aged 25)			(Football Association of Indonesia) Bintang Timur
	GK	Muhammad Nizar	17 February 1995 (aged 30)			(Football Association of Indonesia) Pangsuma
	DF	Ardiansyah Nur	27 August 1997 (aged 28)			(Football Association of Indonesia) Black Steel
	DF	Dewa Rizki Amanda	16 January 2001 (aged 24)			(Football Association of Indonesia) Cosmo JNE
	DF	Rizki Xavier	15 January 1999 (aged 26)			(Football Association of Indonesia) Cosmo JNE
	MF	Firman Adriansyah	9 February 2000 (aged 25)			(Football Association of Indonesia) Bintang Timur
	MF	Iqbal Iskandar Rahmatullah (captain)	23 August 1995 (aged 30)			(Football Association of Indonesia) Bintang Timur
	MF	Syauqi Saud Lubis	29 January 1997 (aged 28)			(Football Association of Indonesia) Bintang Timur
	MF	Romi Humandri	7 November 1999 (aged 26)			(Football Association of Indonesia) Pangsuma
	MF	Wendy Brian Ick	14 October 1999 (aged 26)			(Football Association of Indonesia) Black Steel
	MF	Reza Gunawan	25 October 1998 (aged 27)			(Football Association of Indonesia) Cosmo JNE
	FW	Evan Soumilena	19 November 1996 (aged 29)			(Football Association of Indonesia) Black Steel
	FW	Israr Megantara	19 October 2004 (aged 21)			(Football Association of Indonesia) Cosmo JNE
	FW	Samuel Eko	16 May 1998 (age 28)			(Football Association of Indonesia) Bintang Timur

=== Vietnam ===
Head coach: (Argentina) Diego Giustozzi

Vietnam announced their 20-men preliminary squad on 30 October 2025. The final squad was announced on 13 December 2025.

No.	Pos.	Player	Date of birth (age)	Caps	Goals	Club
	GK	Phạm Văn Tú	7 April 1997 (aged 28)			(Vietnam Football Federation) Thái Sơn Bắc
	GK	Trần Văn Lương	14 December 2003 (aged 22)			(Vietnam Football Federation) Thai Son Nam HCMC
	DF	Nhan Gia Hưng	13 July 2002 (aged 23)			(Vietnam Football Federation) Thai Son Nam HCMC
	DF	Đinh Công Viên	7 January 2002 (aged 23)			(Vietnam Football Federation) Sahako
	DF	Nguyễn Mạnh Dũng	9 June 1997 (aged 28)			(Vietnam Football Federation) Thai Son Nam HCMC
	DF	Phạm Đức Hòa	12 April 1991 (aged 34)			(Vietnam Football Federation) Thai Son Nam HCMC
	DF	Trần Quang Nguyên	12 January 2006 (aged 19)			(Vietnam Football Federation) Thái Sơn Bắc
	MF	Dương Ngọc Linh	20 May 1997 (aged 28)			(Vietnam Football Federation) Thai Son Nam HCMC
	MF	Vũ Ngọc Ánh	22 February 2004 (aged 21)			(Vietnam Football Federation) Thái Sơn Bắc
	MF	Trịnh Công Đại	16 March 2005 (aged 20)			(Vietnam Football Federation) Thái Sơn Bắc
	MF	Từ Minh Quang	1 November 1998 (aged 27)			(Vietnam Football Federation) Thái Sơn Bắc
	FW	Nguyễn Thịnh Phát	10 June 1997 (aged 28)			(Vietnam Football Federation) Thai Son Nam HCMC
	FW	Nguyễn Minh Trí	8 April 1996 (aged 29)			(Vietnam Football Federation) Thai Son Nam HCMC
	FW	Nguyễn Đa Hải	13 August 2005 (aged 20)			(Vietnam Football Federation) Thái Sơn Bắc

=== Myanmar ===
Head coach: (Thailand) Pattaya Piamkum

=== Malaysia ===
Head coach: (Thailand) Rakphol Sainetngam

Malaysia announced their final squad on 13 December 2025.

No.	Pos.	Player	Date of birth (age)	Club
	GK	Zainulzahin Sinuan	2 January 2000 (aged 25)	(Football Association of Malaysia) Pahang Rangers
	GK	Syaifuddin Syukri	30 July 2002 (aged 23)	(Football Association of Malaysia) Selangor
	DF	Harith Na'im	18 January 2000 (aged 25)	(Football Association of Malaysia) Pahang Rangers
	DF	Syed Shahrul Niezam	30 October 1999 (aged 26)	(Football Association of Malaysia) Terengganu
	DF	Firdaus Ambiah	2 May 1991 (aged 34)	(Football Association of Malaysia) Johor Darul Ta'zim
	MF	Razin Rahim	6 February 1995 (aged 30)	(Football Association of Malaysia) Pahang Rangers
	MF	Faris Johan	8 May 2000 (aged 25)	(Football Association of Malaysia) Selangor
	MF	Syahir Iqbal	29 September 2005 (aged 20)	(Football Association of Malaysia) Selangor
	MF	Khairul Effendy	3 December 1987 (aged 38)	(Football Association of Malaysia) Selangor
	MF	Ridzwan Bakri	25 August 1994 (aged 31)	(Football Association of Malaysia) Johor Darul Ta'zim
	MF	Saad Sani	27 February 1998 (aged 27)	(Football Association of Malaysia) Johor Darul Ta'zim
	MF	Danial Dain	10 September 1996 (aged 29)	(Football Association of Malaysia) Johor Darul Ta'zim
	FW	Awalluddin Mat Nawi	2 February 1998 (aged 27)	(Football Association of Malaysia) Johor Darul Ta'zim
	FW	Ekmal Shahrin	13 July 2000 (aged 25)	(Football Association of Malaysia) Johor Darul Ta'zim
