= Indonesia Futsal Super Cup =

Indonesian futsal competition

- Founded: 2024
- Region: Indonesia
- Teams: 8 (total)
- Broadcaster(s): MNCTV, Sportstars
- 2024 Indonesia Futsal Super Cup

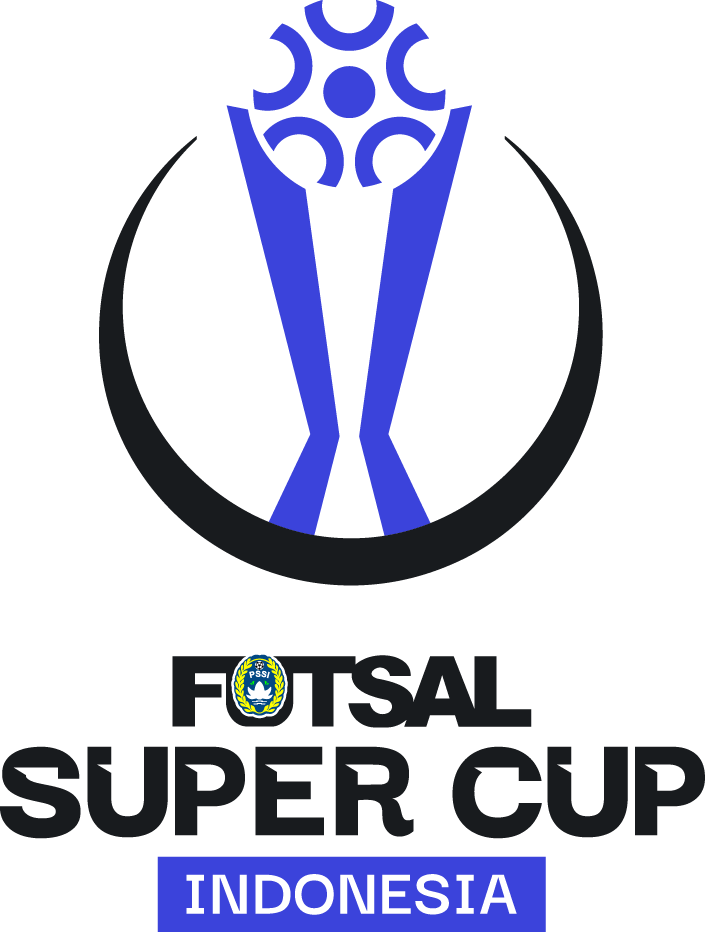
The official logo of the Futsal Super Cup Indonesia is copyrighted by the Indonesian Futsal Federation and was designed by Syakira Iknurizqa in 2024.

Indonesia Futsal Super Cup (also known as 3Second Futsal Super Cup 2024 for sponsorship reasons with 3Second) is an annual pre-season for Indonesia futsal teams. It is organized by the Indonesia Futsal Federation (FFI) and was founded in the season 2024. It is contested annually by the top eight teams in the previous season's Indonesia Pro Futsal League standings, in a neutral venue in different cities every year.

== 2024 teams ==
The following the top 8 teams in the Indonesia Pro Futsal League 2023–24 season. Pendekar United (7th in PFL) withdraws from Indonesian futsal league and replaced by Moncongbulo (9th in PFL).

Team	City	Province
Bintang Timur	Surabaya	East Java
Black Steel	Manokwari	West Papua
Pangsuma	Pontianak	West Kalimantan
Cosmo JNE	Jakarta	Jakarta
Unggul	Malang	East Java
Fafage Banua	Banjarmasin	South Kalimantan
Halus	Jakarta	Jakarta
Moncongbulo	Gowa	South Sulawesi

== Season by season ==
Season	Venue	Champion	Score	Runners-up	Third place	Score	Fourth place
2024	GOR Bung Karno, Sukoharjo	Bintang Timur Surabaya	3–2	Black Steel Papua	Cosmo JNE	1–0	Fafage Banua
2025	GOR Manahan, Surakarta	Cosmo JNE	3–2	Fafage Banua	Black Steel Papua	5–2	Bintang Timur Surabaya

=== Number of titles ===
Club	Winners	Runners-up	Years won	Years runners-up
Bintang Timur Surabaya	1	0	2024	—
Cosmo JNE	1	0	2025	—
Black Steel Papua	0	1	—	2024
Fafage Banua	0	1	—	2025

== See also ==
- Indonesia Pro Futsal League
- Nusantara Futsal League
- Indonesia Futsal Nation Cup
