= 2019 Indonesia Pro Futsal League =

Twelfth season of Indonesia Pro Futsal League

Indonesia Pro Futsal League
- Dates: 8 December 2018 – 31 March 2019
- Champions: Vamos Mataram
- AFC Futsal Club Championship: Vamos Mataram
- AFF Futsal Club Championship: Black steel Manokwari
- Top goalscorer: Andri Kustiawan (Bintang Timur) (18 goals)
- All statistics correct as of 16 December 2018.

2019 Indonesia Pro Futsal League was the twelfth season of Indonesia Pro Futsal League organized by the Indonesia Futsal Federation, as well as the fourth season of the futsal competition under the name "Pro Futsal League". Sixteen Indonesian futsal clubs will compete for this competition, with four clubs from the 2018 Nusantara Futsal League semi-finalists. Vamos Mataram are the defending champions from last season. This season started from 8 December 2018 until the final stage on 31 March 2019.

== Teams ==
There are 16 futsal teams that will be competing in this season.

=== Group A ===
Club	City	2018 season
Bifor	Jayapura, Papua	2018 Nusantara Futsal League Winner
Bintang Timur Surabaya	Surabaya, East Java	5th place in Group B
Black Steel Manokwari	Manokwari, West Papua	1st Place in Group B; 4th place in Final Four
Futsal Kota Metro	Metro, Lampung	4th place in 2018 Nusantara Futsal League
IPC Pelindo	Jakarta	4th place Group B
Kancil BBK	Pontianak, West Kalimantan	3rd Place in Group B
Pelindo IV Permata Indah	Manokwari, West Papua	2nd Place in Group B; 3rd place in Final Four; Establish cooperation with Pelindo IV FC Makassar and changed its name into Pelindo IV Permata Indah FC

=== Group B ===
Club	City	2018 season
Bara	Samarinda, East Kalimantan	Replaces Mataram FC slot that resigned from this season; Contains Indonesia national under-20 futsal team players
Cosmo	Jakarta	4th place in Group A when played as My Futsal Cosmo FC Jakarta
Devina Kamiada	Jakarta	3rd Place in 2018 Nusantara Futsal League; Establish cooperation with Kamiada FC Bekasi and changed its name to Devina Kamiada FC
Giga	Metro, Lampung	3rd Place in Group A
FC Pegasus	Sambas, West Kalimantan	Acquired Dyvy SFC Planet Sleman team; 6th place in Group A when played as Dyvy SFC Planet Sleman
SKN	Kebumen, Central Java	2nd Place in Group A; 2018 IPFL Runner-up
Vamos Mataram	Mataram, West Nusa Tenggara	1st Place in Group A; 2018 IPFL Winner
Young Rior	Masamba, South Sulawesi	Runner-up of 2018 Nusantara Futsal League

=== Foreign players ===
Clubs	Player 1	Player 2
Bintang Timur Surabaya	(Serbia) Darko Ristić	(Iran) Mohammad Geravand
Black Steel FC Manokwari	(Thailand) Nattawut Madyalan	(Thailand) Jetsada Chudech
IPC Pelindo II FC Jakarta	(Azerbaijan) Fineo de Araujo	(Paraguay) Wilson Veiga Neto
SKN FC Kebumen	(Netherlands) Said Bouzambou	(Netherlands) Khalid El Hattach
Vamos FC Mataram	(Iran) Mostafa Nazari	(Iran) Mohammad Reza Kord

== Schedules and venues ==
Eight venues in eight cities in Indonesia will host 2019 Indonesia Pro Futsal League from the group stage. Group stage will be held from 8 December 2018 until 24 March 2019, meanwhile the knockout stage will be held on 6 and 7 April 2019.

The host city of the 2019 Indonesia Pro Futsal League.
Red: Group stage and knockout stage Yellow: Group stage.

Meanwhile, the schedule of the Indonesia Pro Futsal League 2019 group stage is as follows below.

Grup A		Grup B	
Place	Date	Place	Date
GOR POPKI Cibubur, Jakarta	8–9 December 2018	GOR Universitas Negeri Yogyakarta, Yogyakarta	16–17 December 2018
GOR Tri Dharma, Gresik	5–6 January 2019	GOT Sasana Krida Raga Satria, Purwokerto	12–13 January 2019
GOR Pangsuma, Pontianak	19–20 January 2019	GOR 17 December, Mataram	26–27 January 2019
GOR POPKI Cibubur, Jakarta	2–3 February 2019	GOR Saburai, Bandar Lampung	9–10 February 2019
GOR Pangsuma, Pontianak	16–17 February 2019	GOT Sasana Krida Raga Satria, Purwokerto	23–24 February 2019
GOT Sasana Krida Raga Satria, Purwokerto	2–3 March 2019	GOR Universitas Negeri Yogyakarta, Yogyakarta	9–10 March 2019
GOR Tri Dharma, Gresik	16–17 March 2019	GOR Laga Tangkas, Cibinong	23–24 March 2019

== Group stage ==
=== Group A ===
Pos	Team	Pld	W	D	L	GF	GA	GD	Pts	Qualification or relegation
1	Black Steel	14	12	2	0	88	29	+59	38	Qualified to big four
2	Bintang Timur	14	11	0	3	66	40	+26	33	Qualified to big four
3	IPC Pelindo II	14	7	4	3	61	49	+12	25	
4	Halus	14	5	2	7	44	52	−8	17	
5	Kancil BBK	14	4	4	6	42	42	0	16	
6	Pelindo IV Permata Indah	14	5	0	9	37	57	−20	15	
7	Bifor	14	3	4	7	47	57	−10	13	Relegation to Liga Futsal Nusantara
8	Futsal Kota Metro	14	1	0	13	34	93	−59	3	Relegation to Liga Futsal Nusantara

Source: Bolalob
Rules for classification: 1) Poin; 2) Poin head-to-head; 2) Selisih gol; 3) Jumlah gol yang dicetak; 4) Pengundian.

Home \ Away	BIF	BIN	BLA	FKM	HAL	IPC	KCL	PER
Bifor	—	2–6	1–6	8–2	3–5	6–6	3–3	0–4
Bintang Timur	3–4	—	2–7	11–3	6–3	4–3	1–0	11–2
Black Steel	8–3	8–2	—	8–0	3–3	6–1	3–1	9–3
Futsal Kota Metro	3–2	4–8	2–11	—	1–9	7–8	1–4	1–3
Halus	4–3	1–4	2–6	3–1	—	3–9	3–3	2–5
IPC Pelindo II	3–3	1–2	4–4	7–2	4–2	—	4–4	4–3
Kancil BBK	4–4	1–4	4–5	7–4	0–1	2–3	—	2–1
Pelindo IV Permata Indah	0–5	1–2	1–4	4–3	4–3	1–4	5–7	—

Source: Bolalob
Legend: Blue = home team win; Yellow = draw; Red = away team win.
For upcoming matches, an "a" indicates there is an article about the rivalry between the two participants.

=== Group B ===
Pos	Team	Pld	W	D	L	GF	GA	GD	Pts	Qualification or relegation
1	Vamos	14	12	2	0	58	26	+32	38	Qualified to big four
2	SKN	14	11	1	2	64	38	+26	34	Qualified to big four
3	Cosmo	14	5	5	4	47	45	+2	20	
4	Devina Kamiada	14	5	3	6	38	42	−4	18	
5	Giga	14	4	6	4	41	38	+3	18	
6	Young Rior	14	4	1	9	50	59	−9	13	
7	Bara	14	3	3	8	40	49	−9	12	Relegation to Liga Futsal Nusantara
8	FC Pegasus	14	1	1	12	23	64	−41	4	Relegation to Liga Futsal Nusantara

Source: Bolalob
Rules for classification: 1) Poin; 2) Poin head-to-head; 2) Selisih gol; 3) Jumlah gol yang dicetak; 4) Pengundian.

Home \ Away	BAR	COS	DEV	GIG	PEG	SKN	VAM	YOU
Bara	—	3–3	1–3	2–7	6–0	3–7	1–4	1–3
Cosmo	5–5	—	2–4	3–3	4–3	1–2	1–3	5–2
Devina Kamiada	2–3	1–6	—	3–3	3–1	2–4	1–1	4–2
Giga	3–3	4–4	1–0	—	5–1	3–4	1–3	3–2
FC Pegasus	2–1	1–4	2–3	2–2	—	2–8	1–5	3–4
SKN	2–1	4–4	6–3	4–2	6–2	—	4–5	4–2
Vamos	3–2	7–1	6–5	1–1	6–2	4–0	—	5–2
Young Rior	5–8	3–4	4–4	6–3	7–1	4–9	4–5	—

Source: Bolalob
Legend: Blue = home team win; Yellow = draw; Red = away team win.
For upcoming matches, an "a" indicates there is an article about the rivalry between the two participants.

== Final Four stage ==
Final Four stage will be played on 30 and 31 March 2019.

- All matches will be played ini TBA.
- All times listed are UTC+7

Semi-finals
30 March
Black Steel	2 (3)
SKN	2 (1)
30 March
Vamos	6
Bintang Timur	2

Final
31 March
Black Steel	5
Vamos	6
Third place
31 March
SKN	2
Bintang Timur	1

=== Semi-finals ===
30 March 2019
11:00

Black Steel	2–2	SKN
Nattawut 7', 16'	Report	Khalid 7'; Fhandy 40'
Penalties
Rasyid (penalty scored); Jetsada (penalty scored); Nur (penalty scored)	3–1	Fhandy (penalty scored); Sadi (penalty missed)

GOR Universitas Negeri Yogyakarta, Yogyakarta
30 March 2019
14:00

Vamos	6–2	Bintang Timur
Marvin 5'; Ali 13'; Denis 19'; Al Fajri 27'; Nandi 33', 39'	Report	Andri 11'; Reza 14'

GOR Universitas Negeri Yogyakarta, Yogyakarta

=== Third place match ===
31 March 2019
11:00

SKN	2–1	Bintang Timur
Farhan 4'; Khalid 6'	Report	Geravand 14'

GOR Universitas Negeri Yogyakarta, Yogyakarta

=== Final ===
31 March 2019
14:00

Black Steel	5–6	Vamos
Samuel 6'; Nur 23', 37'; Rio 27'; Jetsada 34'	Report	Syahidansyah 5'; Ali 8', 13'; Denis 27'; Obay 30'; Nandi 39' (pen.)

GOR Universitas Negeri Yogyakarta, Yogyakarta
