= Atta Halilintar =

Indonesian YouTuber and social media personality (born 1994)

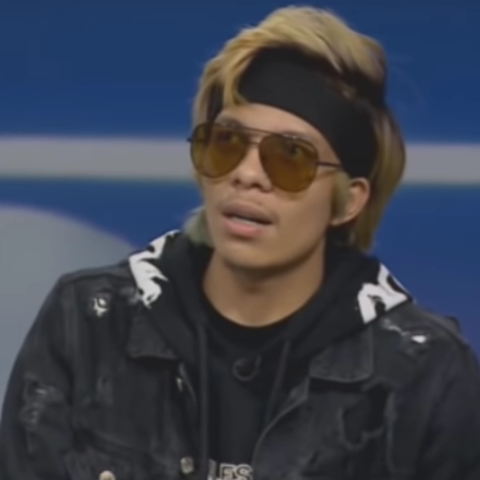
- Atta Halilintar in 2019
- Born: Muhammad Attamimi Halilintar; 20 November 1994 (age 31); Dumai, Riau, Indonesia
- Occupations: YouTuber; Influencer; Celebrity; Rapper; Businessperson
- Years active: 2016–present
- Spouse: Aurel Hermansyah (m. 2021)
- Relatives: Anang Hermansyah (father-in law); Krisdayanti (mother-in law); Ashanty (mother-in law)

YouTube information
- Channel: AH
- Subscribers: 31.4 million
- Views: 5.605 billion
- Last updated: 16 November 2025

Muhammad Attamimi Halilintar (born 20 November 1994), professionally known as Atta Halilintar, is an Indonesian YouTuber, content creator, social media personality, actor, singer and businessman. He is the first YouTuber in Southeast Asia to earn the Diamond Play Button. He is currently regarded as the most popular YouTuber in Indonesia and hails from the popular Gen Halilintar family, which is known for recording songs and publications. As of December 2021, he has approximately 28.3 million subscribers and is currently ranked as the 301st-most-subscribed YouTube channel as of 2026. Atta Halilintar has also notably featured in a few films as a supporting actor and has also recorded a few songs as a rapper.

== Early life ==
Atta Halilintar was born in Dumai, Riau as the eldest of 11 children in his family which is popularly known as the Gen Halilintar. The Gen Halilintar family joined the entertainment industry by publishing books about their journey around the world, making vlogs and recording songs. His siblings are also known for recording songs and YouTube videos. He inherited his family business from his parents at a young age. During his childhood, his parents experienced major obstacles and difficulties in running their family business when they lived in Malaysia. He then concentrated to engage in business activities selling food and toys at his young age while pursuing his primary education in elementary school.

== Career ==
=== YouTube ===
While busy with his family business, he launched his official YouTube account in 2016 and became popular in Indonesia in a matter of years. He became the first YouTuber from South East Asia to cross 10 million subscribers as of February 2019. In August 2019, his YouTube account was reported to have achieved 18.5 million subscribers. He also became the eighth-highest-earning YouTuber in the world, with a net worth of £1.37 million as of August 2019.

In November 2019, he became the first Indonesian YouTuber to surpass the milestone of 20 million subscribers, an achievement that was mentioned and recognized as part of YouTube Rewind's 2019 edition. Beyond Indonesia, he also currently has the highest number of subscribers in the ASEAN region.

=== Businesses ===
He owns multiple business ventures, mostly under his AHHA brand, including the AHHA Hijab brands.

==== Sports ====
His most famous ventures are those related to sport club ownership. Atta Halilintar is one of the owners of Liga 2 side, FC Bekasi City. He is also the owner of Indonesia Pro Futsal League side, Pendekar United. Pendekar also has its esports division, named Pendekar Esport, which were co-owned by Atta Halilintar along with his brother, Thariq Halilintar, and Jabin Sufianto.

In a virtual press conference on 14 June 2021, Atta Halilintar and PStore's Putra Siregar acquired PSG (Putra Safin Group) Pati, an Indonesian football club which at the time competed in Liga 2, from its owner, Saiful Arifin. They renamed the club AHHA PS Pati. Atta Halilintar and Putra Siregar became co-chairmen of the newly acquired club. In its first season, the club endured a difficult season in which they barely avoided relegation. Before the start of the 2022–23 season, the club relocated to Bekasi and changed its name to Bekasi FC. The club was forced to change its name again to FC Bekasi City, due to a dispute over intellectual property rights to the name 'Bekasi FC'. After 2022–23 Liga 2 was abandoned, Atta Halilintar said in an interview that he had given up football and instead pivoted his attention over to futsal.

A few weeks before the start of the 2021–22 Indonesia Pro Futsal League, Atta Halilintar acquired PFL side Young Rior Luwu Utara, moved its base to Jakarta, and changed its name to Pendekar United. At the club's launch, his name was also included in the player list, something that occurred again the very next season. Atta Halilintar made headlines around the futsal world by signing the sixth-time winner of the best futsal player in the world award and FIFA Futsal World Cup winner, Ricardinho, for the second half of the season with an option of another season's extension. During the 2022–23 Indonesia Pro Futsal League season, Atta Halilintar made his debut for Pendekar on 16 July 2023 in a match against Sadakata United, which ended in a defeat for Pendekar.

== Personal life ==
On April 3, 2021, Atta Halilintar married Aurel Hermansyah, the first child of politician and musician. The wedding was attended by President Joko Widodo, who served as witness, and Defence Minister Prabowo Subianto. Atta and Aurel have two daughters, Ameena Hanna Nur Atta (born 2022) and Azura Humaira Nur Atta (born 2023).

Atta Halilintar has said that his favorite sport is not football, but futsal, a sport that he has played since he was young. In the same interview, he said that he once aspired to become a professional futsal player. Due to his involvement with futsal in Indonesia, the Indonesia Futsal Federation (FFI) appointed Atta Halilintar as a FFI Executive Committee (Exco) member for Futsal Business Empowerment and Development.

== Controversies ==
In March 2019, he posted a video on his official Instagram account featuring himself with a gun in the wake of the 2019 Christchurch mosque shootings. His video was slammed, with people calling it a result of toxic behaviour.

In November 2019, he was accused of blasphemy and was reported to the police for a prank video on Islamic prayers.

== Filmography ==
- 13: The Haunted (2018)
- Belok Kanan Barcelona (2018)
- The Return of the Devil Child (2019)
- Ashiap Man (2020)

== Discography ==
- Viral (2017)
- Don't forget to be happy (2017)
- Eid song (2018)
- God Bless You (2018)
- Dimensions of Love (2018)
- Work Hard Pray Hard (2018)
- Ramadan has arrived (2018)
- Anak Indonesia (2019)
- Exposure (2019)
- Teman tapi Cinta (2020)
- Bersama Kita Mampu (2020)
- Calon Bojo (2020)
- Aku Miss You (2021)
- Hari Bahhagia (2021)
- Takbir (2021)
- This is Indonesia (2021)

== See also ==
- List of YouTubers
