= 2021–22 Indonesia Pro Futsal League =

Indonesia Pro Futsal League
- Dates: 8 January – 21 August 2022
- Champions: Bintang Timur Surabaya
- Relegated: Nusantara Futsal League
- AFC Futsal Club Championship: Bintang Timur Surabaya
- Matches: 132
- Goals: 833 (6.31 per match)
- Best player: (Indonesia) Sunny Rizky
- Top goalscorer: (Brazil) Diego Rodrigo (26 goals)
- Highest scoring: Bintang Timur 10–4 Giga; Pelindo 2–12 Cosmo JNE; Pelindo 5–9 Bintang Timur
- Longest winning run: 9 match Bintang Timur
- Longest unbeaten run: 11 Match; Bintang Timur
- Longest winless run: 8 Match; Pelindo Mutiara

The 2021–22 Indonesia Pro Futsal League, was the 14th season of the Indonesia Pro Futsal League competition held by the Indonesian Futsal Federation, as well as the sixth season of futsal competition under the name "Professional Futsal League". The season started on 8 January 2022 and was scheduled to finish on 21 August 2022.

Black Steel Manokwari are the defending champions. A total of 12 Indonesian futsal clubs will compete for the championship of this competition, with two clubs coming from the 2020 Nusantara Futsal League finalists.

== Teams ==
Twelve teams is competing in the league:

| Club | Cities |
|---|---|
| Bintang Timur | Surabaya |
| Black Steel | Manokwari |
| Cosmo JNE | Jakarta |
| DBAsia Jabar | Bandung |
| Giga | Metro |
| Halus | Jakarta |
| Kancil BBK | Pontianak |
| Pelindo | Jakarta |
| Pendekar United | Jakarta |
| Sadakata | Subulussalam |
| Safin | Pati |
| Vamos | Mataram |

Location City of Origin of the participating Clubs in the 2021-2021 Indonesian Professional Futsal League competition.

== Venue and schedule ==
There are 9 locations in 9 cities that will host professional futsal league matches this year.

Host City of Pro Futsal League 2021-2022.

| Week | Date | Venue |
|---|---|---|
| I | 8-9 January 2022 | GOR Universitas Negeri Surabaya, Surabaya |
| II | 15-16 January 2022 | GOR Universitas Negeri Jakarta, DKI Jakarta |
| III | 22-23 January 2022 | GOR Universitas Negeri Jakarta, DKI Jakarta |
| IV | 29-30 January 2022 | GOR Universitas Negeri Jakarta, DKI Jakarta |
| V | 5-6 February 2022 | GOR Universitas Negeri Jakarta, DKI Jakarta |
| VI | 12-13 February 2022 | GOR Universitas Negeri Jakarta, DKI Jakarta |
| VII-VIII | 19-20 February 2022 | Giga Futsal Arena, Metro |
| IX | 26-27 January 2022 | GOR Manunggal Jati, Semarang |
| X | 5-6 March 2022 | GOR Universitas Negeri Surabaya, Surabaya |
| XI | 12-13 March 2022 | GOR Universitas Negeri Jakarta, Jakarta |
| XII | 18-19 June 2022 | GOR Pangsuma, Pontianak |
| XIII | 25-26 June 2022 | GOR Pangsuma, Pontianak |
| XIV | 2-3 July 2022 | GOR Tegal Selatan, Tegal |
| XV | 11-12 July 2022 | GOR Patut Patuh Patju, Lombok Barat |
| XVI | 16-17 July 2022 | GOR Universitas Negeri Yogyakarta, Yogyakarta |
| XVII | 23-24 July 2022 | Gedung Serbaguna Provinsi Sumatra Utara, Medan |
| XVIII | 30-31 July 2022 | GOR Universitas Negeri Yogyakarta, Yogyakarta |
| XIX | 6-7 August 2022 | GOR Universitas Negeri Surabaya, Surabaya |
| XX | 13-14 August 2022 | GOR Universitas Negeri Jakarta, Jakarta |
| XXI | 20-21 August 2022 | Giga Futsal Arena, Metro |

== League table ==
| Pos | Team | Pld | W | D | L | GF | GA | GD | Pts | Qualification or relegation |
|---|---|---|---|---|---|---|---|---|---|---|
| 1 | Bintang Timur (Q) | 22 | 18 | 3 | 1 | 114 | 40 | +74 | 57 (Note: Match results head-to-head: Bintang Timur 3–3 Black Steel; Black Steel 0–1 Bintang Timur.) | Qualified to AFC Futsal Club Championship |
| 2 | Black Steel | 22 | 18 | 3 | 1 | 102 | 42 | +60 | 57 | Qualified to AFF Futsal Club Championship |
| 3 | Cosmo JNE | 22 | 15 | 4 | 3 | 104 | 50 | +54 | 49 | |
| 4 | Pendekar United | 22 | 13 | 3 | 6 | 84 | 64 | +20 | 42 | |
| 5 | Kancil BBK | 22 | 7 | 6 | 9 | 53 | 53 | 0 | 27 | |
| 6 | DBAsia Jabar | 22 | 5 | 8 | 9 | 63 | 76 | −13 | 23 (Note: Match results head-to-head: DBAsia Jabar 3–3 Vamos; Vamos 5–5 DBAsia. DBAsia Jabar win over goal difference from Vamos FC.) | |
| 7 | Vamos | 22 | 6 | 5 | 11 | 60 | 81 | −21 | 23 | |
| 8 | Halus | 22 | 6 | 4 | 12 | 41 | 66 | −25 | 22 | |
| 9 | Pelindo | 22 | 6 | 3 | 13 | 58 | 88 | −30 | 21 (Note: Match results head-to-head: Pelindo 1–3 Giga; Giga 0–5 Pelindo.) | |
| 10 | Giga | 22 | 6 | 3 | 13 | 48 | 94 | −46 | 21 | |
| 11 | Sadakata | 22 | 6 | 2 | 14 | 57 | 94 | −37 | 20 | Relegated to Nusantara Futsal League |
| 12 | Safin (R) | 22 | 4 | 0 | 18 | 49 | 85 | −36 | 12 | Relegated to Nusantara Futsal League |

Source: Skor.id
Rules for classification: 1) Point; 2) Head-to-head; 3) Goals difference; 4) Goals scored; 5) Draw.
(Q) Qualified for the phase indicated; (R) Relegated

== Results ==
| Home \ Away | BIN | BLA | COS | DBA | GIG | HAL | KAN | PEL | PEN | SAF | SAD | VAM |
|---|---|---|---|---|---|---|---|---|---|---|---|---|
| Bintang Timur | — | 3–3 | 4–4 | 4–0 | 10–4 | 5–2 | 1–1 | 6–1 | 4–1 | 7–1 | 6–1 | 4–1 |
| Black Steel | 0–1 | — | 5–3 | 5–4 | 4–1 | 3–0 | 3–2 | 3–1 | 6–2 | 5–2 | 7–0 | 2–2 |
| Cosmo JNE | 2–4 | 6–8 | — | 6–1 | 7–2 | 1–0 | 4–0 | 4–2 | 3–2 | 3–0 | 4–3 | 5–1 |
| DBAsia Jabar | 1–4 | 0–6 | 1–2 | — | 4–6 | 4–4 | 2–2 | 1–1 | 6–7 | 5–4 | 4–1 | 3–3 |
| Giga | 2–9 | 1–6 | 1–9 | 3–6 | — | 0–0 | 1–4 | 0–5 | 2–4 | 2–0 | 3–3 | 3–6 |
| Halus | 1–6 | 1–5 | 1–9 | 0–1 | 1–1 | — | 0–3 | 2–3 | 1–2 | 4–1 | 2–6 | 1–1 |
| Kancil BBK | 3–5 | 1–5 | 1–1 | 1–1 | 2–4 | 2–3 | — | 3–1 | 1–2 | 3–2 | 7–3 | 1–2 |
| Pelindo | 5–9 | 1–6 | 2–12 | 3–3 | 1–3 | 3–2 | 4–4 | — | 4–6 | 2–1 | 3–5 | 0–5 |
| Pendekar United | 1–4 | 3–3 | 3–3 | 3–3 | 6–4 | 3–4 | 4–3 | 7–3 | — | 6–0 | 3–2 | 5–2 |
| Safin | 5–3 | 4–5 | 4–6 | 2–5 | 0–1 | 3–5 | 1–3 | 1–6 | 5–3 | — | 2–3 | 4–1 |
| Sadakata | 1–6 | 1–5 | 3–6 | 4–3 | 3–4 | 3–4 | 1–1 | 4–2 | 1–7 | 3–4 | — | 4–3 |
| Vamos | 0–9 | 3–7 | 4–4 | 5–5 | 4–0 | 1–3 | 3–5 | 1–5 | 0–4 | 4–3 | 8–4 | — |

Updated to match(es) played on 22 August 2022. Source: Skor.id
Legend: Blue = home team win; Yellow = draw; Red = away team win.

== Season statistics ==
=== Top goalscorers ===
| Rank | Player | Club | Goals |
|---|---|---|---|
| 1 | (Brazil) Diego Rodrigo | Black Steel | 26 |
| 2 | (Indonesia) Evan Soumilena | Black Steel | 24 |
| 3 | (Indonesia) Reza Gunawan | Cosmo JNE | 22 |
| 4 | (Indonesia) Firman Adriansyah | Cosmo JNE | 18 |
| 5 | (Indonesia) Ardiansyah Runtuboy | Bintang Timur | 16 |
| 5 | (Indonesia) Subhan Faidasa | Pendekar United | 16 |
| 7 | (Indonesia) Andri Kustiawan | Bintang Timur | 15 |
| 7 | (Indonesia) Singgih Romana Jati | Safin | 15 |
| 9 | (Indonesia) Muhammad Fajriyan | DBAsia Jabar | 14 |
| 10 | (Indonesia) Reza Yamani | Cosmo JNE | 13 |
| 11 | (Iran) Vahid Shafiei | Cosmo JNE | 12 |
| 11 | (Indonesia) Muhammad Agung Pandega | Pendekar United | 12 |
| 11 | (Indonesia) Ardian Kaspari | Vamos | 12 |

== See also ==
- Indonesia Women's Pro Futsal League
