= 2022–23 Indonesia Women's Pro Futsal League =

Indonesia Women's Pro Futsal League
- Season: 2022–23
- Dates: 27 May – 2 July 2023
- Champions: Pusaka Angels
- Relegated: Pansa Arimbi
- Matches played: 30
- Goals scored: 146 (4.87 per match)
- Best Player: (Indonesia) Novita Murni Piranti
- Top goalscorer: (Indonesia) Febriana Kusuma (11 goals)
- Biggest home win: Pusaka Angels 11–0 Pansa Arimbi
- Biggest away win: Pansa Arimbi 0–10 Pusaka Angels
- Highest scoring: Pusaka Angels 11–0 Pansa Arimbi
- Longest winning run: 6 match Pusaka Angels
- Longest unbeaten run: 10 Match; Pusaka Angels
- Longest winless run: 10 Match; Pansa Arimbi
- Longest losing run: 10 Match; Pansa Arimbi
- All statistics correct as of 17 July 2023.

The 2022–23 Indonesia Women's Pro Futsal League is the 9th season of the Indonesia Women's Pro Futsal League competition held by the Indonesia Futsal Federation. The season started after the men's 2022–23 Indonesia Pro Futsal League entered the later half of the season. It was held from 27 May 2023 to 2 July 2023.

Mirroring the men's competition, the league was organized into a single competition home-away series format with six clubs. Matches were held at two venues, GOR Tegal Selatan in Tegal, Central Java and GOR Amongrogo in Yogyakarta.

Pusaka Angels, the defending champion, won the league unbeaten with 8 wins and just 2 draws. Pansa Arimbi were relegated after enduring the season without a single point.

== Teams ==
The following 6 clubs competed in the Indonesia Women's Pro Futsal League for the 2022–23 season.

Team	City	Province
Kebumen Angels	Kebumen	Central Java
Muara Enim United	Muara Enim	South Sumatra
Netic Ladies	Bogor	West Java
Pansa Arimbi	Bantul	Yogyakarta
Pusaka Angels	Kendal	Central Java
Putri Sumatera Selatan	Musi Rawas	South Sumatra

== League table ==
Pos	Team	Pld	W	D	L	GF	GA	GD	Pts	Qualification or relegation
1	Pusaka Angels (C)	10	8	2	0	45	7	+38	26	Qualified to AFF Futsal Club Championship
2	Kebumen United Angels	10	5	3	2	30	13	+17	18	
3	Muara Enim United	10	6	0	4	30	14	+16	18	
4	Netic Ladies	10	4	4	2	21	10	+11	16	
5	Putri Sumatera Selatan	10	2	1	7	16	32	−16	7	
6	Pansa Arimbi (R)	10	0	0	10	4	70	−66	0	Relegated to Women's Nusantara Futsal League

Source: WPFL 2023
(C) Champions; (R) Relegated

== Awards ==
Award	Winner	Club	Ref.
Best Player	(Indonesia) Novita Murni Piranti	Pusaka Angels	
Top Goal Scorer	(Indonesia) Febriana Kusuma	Kebumen Angels	
Fair Play Team	Netic Ladies		

== See also ==
- 2022–23 Indonesia Pro Futsal League
