= Andri Kustiawan =

Indonesian futsal player

Personal information
- Full name: Andri Kustiawan
- Date of birth: 8 June 1991 (age 35)
- Place of birth: Bandung, Indonesia
- Height: 1.75 m (5 ft 9 in)
- Position: Pivot

Team information
- Current team: Bintang Timur
- Number: 10

Youth career
- ?: ?

Senior career*
Years	Team	Apps	(Gls)
2012–2013	Futsal Kota Bandung	?	(21)
2013–2015	FC Libido Bandung	?	(?)
2016–2018	Vamos Mataram	47	(61)
2019–	Bintang Timur Surabaya	28	(34)

International career^{‡}
2012–	Indonesia futsal	30	(23)
- * Club domestic league appearances and goals as of 8 March 2020 ‡ National team caps and goals as of 25 October 2019

Andri Kustiawan (born 6 August 1991 in Bandung, West Java), known as Andrew, is an Indonesian professional futsal player who currently plays for Indonesia Pro Futsal League club Bintang Timur Surabaya and the Indonesia national team.

== Honours ==
=== Club ===
Vamos Mataram

- Indonesia Pro Futsal League Champions: 2017, 2018

=== National team ===
- AFF Futsal Championship Runner-up: 2019
- AFF Futsal Championship Third place: 2012, 2018

=== Individual ===
- Indonesia Pro Futsal League Topscorer: 2013, 2016, 2018, 2019
