= Karim Mossaoui =

Dutch footballer

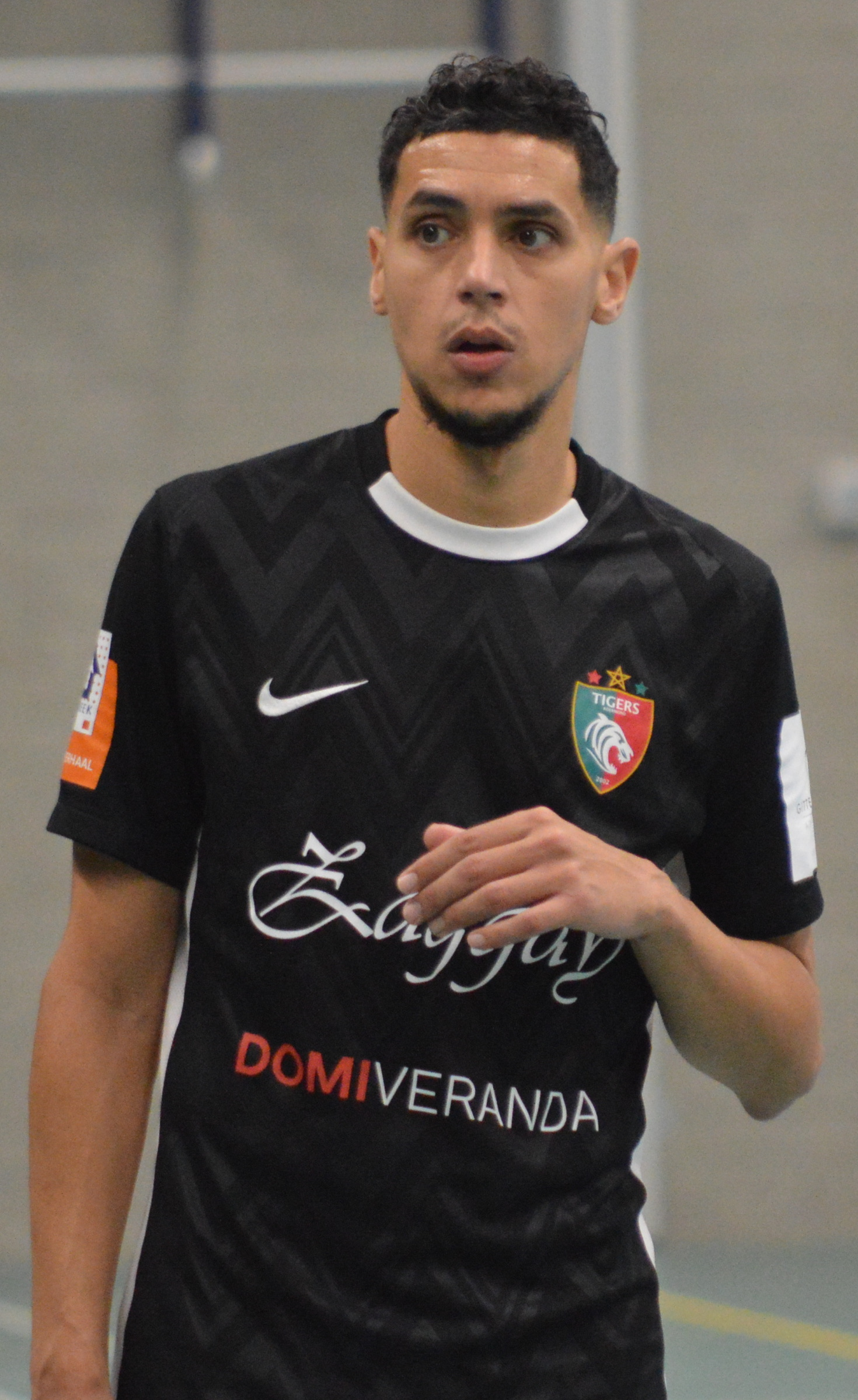

Personal information
- Full name: Karim Mossaoui
- Date of birth: 27 February 1988 (age 38)
- Place of birth: Rotterdam, Netherlands
- Height: 1.76 m (5 ft 9 1/2 in)
- Position: Midfielder

Team information
- Current team: Bintang Timur

Youth career
- Excelsior

Senior career*
Years	Team	Apps	(Gls)
2008–2011	Excelsior	35	(1)
2011	→ Fortuna Sittard (loan)	12	(0)
2011	Etar 1924	3	(0)
2012–2013	Helmond Sport	3	(0)
2013–	TPP Rotterdam (futsal)		
2020–	Bintang Timur	8	(5)
- * Club domestic league appearances and goals as of 17 February 2020 (UTC)

Karim Mossaoui (born 27 February 1988 in Rotterdam) is a Dutch footballer who plays as a midfielder. He currently plays for Indonesian Pro Futsal League club Bintang Timur Surabaya.

== Career ==
Mossaoui started his career at Excelsior, a team he has been part of since childhood, making 35 appearances with one lone goal during the 2008–09 and 2009–10 seasons, but no appearance at all in the club's 2010–11 Eredivisie campaign. He was consequently loaned out to Eerste Divisie club Fortuna Sittard on 31 January 2011.
