= 2022–23 Indonesia Pro Futsal League =

Indonesia Pro Futsal League
- Season: 2022–23
- Dates: 7 January – 6 August 2023
- Champions: Bintang Timur Surabaya; 2nd PFL title
- Relegated: Pelindo Mutiara; Radit FC Pontianak
- AFC Futsal Club Championship: Bintang Timur Surabaya
- AFF Futsal Club Championship: Kancil WHW Pontianak
- Matches: 132
- Goals: 767 (5.81 per match)
- Best Player: (Indonesia) M. Iqbal Iskandar
- Top goalscorer: (Indonesia) Evan Soumilena (33 goals)
- Biggest home win: Kancil WHW 10–1 Pelindo Mutiara; Bintang Timur Surabaya 10–1 Giga
- Biggest away win: Pelindo Mutiara 0–10 Cosmo JNE
- Highest scoring: Pelindo Mutiara 0–10 Cosmo JNE
- Longest winning run: 9 match Bintang Timur
- Longest unbeaten run: 13 Match; Bintang Timur
- Longest winless run: 8 Match; Pelindo Mutiara
- All statistics correct as of 6 August 2023.

The 2022–23 Indonesia Pro Futsal League, was the 15th season of the Indonesia Pro Futsal League competition held by the Indonesia Futsal Federation, as well as the seventh season of futsal competition under the name Professional Futsal League. The season started on 7 January 2023 and ended on 6 August 2023.

Bintang Timur Surabaya are the defending champions. A total of 12 Indonesian futsal clubs will compete for the championship of this competition, with two clubs coming as the 2021–22 Nusantara Futsal League finalists, Unggul FC Malang and Radit FC Pontianak.

Bintang Timur Surabaya successfully defended the title after a 5–3 win against Unggul FC on 30 July 2023 at GOR Amongraga, Yogyakarta. Their 53 points after 20 matches can no longer be reached by second place, Kancil WHW Pontianak, who only won 47 points after 21 matches.

Two teams were relegated, Radit—who were relegated after spending just one season in the PFL—and Pelindo—who were relegated for the first time in their history after Halus secured safety by equaling Pelindo's points and having superior goal differences at the very last match of the season.

== Teams ==
Twelve teams is competing in the league – the top ten teams from the previous season and the two teams promoted from the 2021–22 Nusantara Futsal League. The promoted teams are Unggul and Radit.

=== Name changes ===
- Futsal Jabar was acquired by Sadakata. As a result, Sadakata took over Futsal Jabar place in Pro Futsal League starting from the 2022–23 season and they will compete under name **Sadakata United**.
- Vamos merged with Fafage and changed its name to **Fafage Vamos Banua**.
- Pelindo merged with Mutiara and changed its name to **Pelindo Mutiara**.
- Kancil BBK changed its name (for sponsorship reason) to **Kancil WHW West Kalimantan** for this season.
- Black Steel Manokwari changed its name to **Black Steel Papua**.
Location City of Origin of the participating Clubs in the 2022-2023 Indonesian Professional Futsal League competition.

=== Personnel and kits ===
Club	Headquarter	Head coach	Captain	Kit manufacturer
Bintang Timur	Surabaya	(Spain) Héctor Souto	(Indonesia) Sunny Rizki	(Indonesia) Noij
Black Steel	Manokwari	(Thailand) Rakphol Saingetnam	(Indonesia) Evan Soumilena	(Thailand) Imane
Cosmo JNE	Jakarta	(Indonesia) Deny Handoyo	(Indonesia) Fachri Reza	(Indonesia) Djsport
Fafage Vamos	Banjarmasin	(Indonesia) Sayan Karmadi	(Indonesia) Ari Ramdhani	(Indonesia) Eazywear
Giga	Metro	(Indonesia) Davi Mark Moses	(Indonesia) Agung Rufe'i	(Indonesia) Elten
Halus	Jakarta	(Indonesia) Yolla Hendro	(Indonesia) Adytya	(Indonesia) Ghanida
Kancil WHW	Pontianak	(Indonesia) Wahyu Kocoy	(Indonesia) Diaz Riyansyah	(Indonesia) Classico
Pelindo Mutiara	Jakarta	(Indonesia) Yos Adi Wicaksono	(Indonesia) Jailani Ladjanibi	(Indonesia) Lekaw
Pendekar United	Jakarta	(Indonesia) Arif Kurniawan	(Indonesia) Ryan Dwi Reynaldi	(Indonesia) Godslave
Radit	Pontianak	(Indonesia) Naim Hamid	(Indonesia) Ade Suryanto	(Indonesia) X Collabs
Sadakata United	Subulussalam	(Indonesia) Panca Pauji	(Indonesia) Naufal Efendi	(Indonesia) Narrow
Unggul	Malang	(Indonesia) Andri Irawan	(Indonesia) Ramadhan Zidani	(Indonesia) Debay

=== Foreign players ===
The Indonesian futsal federation has rules regarding foreign players. First, each team may register a maximum of 2 foreign players. Second, every foreign player must have played with the national team of his home country.

- Players named in **bold** indicates the player was registered during the mid-season transfer window.
- Former players named in italics are players that were out of squad or left the club within the season, after the pre-season transfer window, or in the mid-season transfer window, and at least had one appearance.

Clubs	Player 1	Player 2	Former Player
Bintang Timur	(Brazil) Dieguinho	(Azerbaijan) Everton Cardoso	-
Black Steel	(Brazil) Diego Rodrigo	(Brazil) Henrique di Maria	-
Cosmo JNE	-	-	-
Fafage Vamos	(Iran) Ali Abedin	(Paraguay) Veiga Neto	-
Giga	(Afghanistan) **Wahid Samimy**	-	-
Halus	-	-	-
Kancil WHW	(Brazil) Marcus Gava	(Brazil) Daniel Alves	-
Pelindo Mutiara	-	-	-
Pendekar United	(Wales) **Rico Zulkarnain**	(Portugal) Ricardinho (Note: Ricardinho left to join Riga Futsal Club just before Pendekar United play their last match of the season.)	(Venezuela) Wilmer Cabarcas
Radit	-	-	-
Sadakata United	(Uzbekistan) **Elbek Tulkinov**	-	-
Unggul	(Venezuela) Andres Josue Teran	(Argentina) **Facundo Schusterman**	(Thailand) Peerapol Satsue

== Venue and schedule ==
There are 8 locations in 6 cities that will host professional futsal league matches this year.

Host City of Pro Futsal League 2022-2023.

Week	Date	Venue
I	7–8 January 2023	GOR POPKI, Jakarta
II	14–15 January 2023	GOR POPKI, Jakarta
III	28–29 January 2023	GOR GBT, Surabaya
IV	4–5 February 2023	GOR GBT, Surabaya
V	11–12 February 2023	GOR Amongraga, Yogyakarta
VI	25–26 February 2023	GOR UNJ, Jakarta
VII	4–5 March 2023	GOR Pangsuma, Pontianak
VIII	11–12 March 2023	Giga Futsal Arena, Metro
IX	13–14 May 2023	GOR Pangsuma Pontianak
X	20–21 May 2023	GOR Pangsuma Pontianak
XI	17–18 June 2023	Giga Futsal Arena, Metro
XII	8–9 July 2023	GOR POPKI, Jakarta
XIII	15–16 July 2023	GOR POPKI, Jakarta
XIV	22–23 July 2023	GOR Indoor Kanjuruhan, Malang
XV	29–30 July 2023	GOR Amongraga, Yogyakarta
XVI	5–6 August 2023	GOR POPKI, Jakarta

== League table ==
Pos	Team	Pld	W	D	L	GF	GA	GD	Pts	Qualification or relegation
1	Bintang Timur (Q)	22	19	2	1	99	35	+64	59	Qualified to AFC Futsal Club Championship
2	Kancil WHW	22	15	5	2	97	44	+53	50	Qualified to AFF Futsal Club Championship
3	Black Steel	22	14	4	4	82	44	+38	46	
4	Cosmo JNE	22	12	3	7	84	48	+36	39	
5	Pendekar United	22	12	2	8	89	57	+32	38	
6	Fafage Vamos	22	8	3	11	58	70	−12	27	
7	Unggul	22	6	7	9	57	64	−7	25	
8	Giga	22	5	6	11	41	68	−27	21	
9	Sadakata United	22	6	2	14	42	79	−37	20	
10	Halus	22	5	2	15	37	79	−42	17	
11	Pelindo Mutiara (R)	22	4	5	13	34	97	−63	17	Relegated to Nusantara Futsal League
12	Radit (R)	22	4	3	15	45	80	−35	15	Relegated to Nusantara Futsal League

Updated to match(es) played on 6 August 2023. Source: LFP 2022–23
(Q) Qualified for the phase indicated; (R) Relegated

== Results ==
Home \ Away	BIN	BLA	COS	FAF	GIG	HAL	KAN	PEL	PEN	RAD	SAD	UNG
Bintang Timur	—	6–4	2–0	5–2	10–1	8–1	4–3	7–0	5–2	5–0	4–1	2–1
Black Steel	2–3	—	3–2	1–1	5–0	3–1	2–2	6–0	1–5	10–2	5–1	6–3
Cosmo JNE	1–2	2–3	—	2–4	4–4	9–1	1–1	6–0	2–1	4–1	7–4	6–2
Fafage Vamos	4–4	4–4	4–1	—	2–3	0–2	4–0	3–1	2–1	3–1	2–3	1–4
Giga	0–3	0–2	4–7	6–2	—	0–3	1–5	2–2	3–6	2–1	3–0	2–2
Halus	1–5	1–3	1–3	3–4	1–1	—	0–5	1–2	1–7	5–2	1–2	3–3
Kancil WHW	4–4	2–2	3–1	5–4	4–0	8–1	—	10–1	3–3	2–0	8–4	6–2
Pelindo Mutiara	0–6	2–6	0–10	2–4	1–1	3–4	1–9	—	4–8	3–1	4–0	2–1
Pendekar United	3–2	4–2	2–4	4–1	1–1	4–0	7–8	6–0	—	8–6	1–2	4–6
Radit	0–2	0–5	4–6	7–2	1–5	1–3	1–4	2–2	2–1	—	3–1	2–2
Sadakata United	2–5	2–4	1–5	8–4	3–2	3–1	0–3	1–1	0–6	2–5	—	0–3
Unggul	3–5	1–3	1–1	3–1	6–3	3–2	1–2	3–3	2–5	3–3	2–2	—

Updated to match(es) played on 6 August 2023. Source: LFP 2022–23
Legend: Blue = home team win; Yellow = draw; Red = away team win.

== Season statistics ==
=== Top goalscorers ===
As of match played on 6 August 2023.

Rank	Player	Club	Goals
1	(Indonesia) Evan Soumilena	Black Steel	33
2	(Brazil) Dieguinho	Bintang Timur	29
3	(Brazil) Daniel Alves	Kancil WHW	23
4	(Brazil) Diego Rodrigo	Black Steel	18
5	(Indonesia) Reza Yamani	Cosmo JNE	17
6	(Portugal) Ricardinho	Pendekar	16

=== Hat-tricks ===
Player	For	Against	Score	Date
(Indonesia) Alfajri	Cosmo JNE	Pelindo Mutiara	10–0	8 January 2023
(Indonesia) Farhan Fuadi	Halus	Radit	5–2	4 February 2023
(Indonesia) Evan Soumilena^{4}	Black Steel	Pelindo Mutiara	6–2	11 February 2023
(Indonesia) Giovani Careka Mollan	Giga	Cosmo JNE	4–7	25 February 2023
(Indonesia) Andri Caniago	Fafage Vamos	Kancil WHW	4–0	11 March 2023
(Brazil) Daniel Alves^{4}	Kancil WHW	Pelindo Mutiara	9–1	12 March 2023
(Indonesia) Evan Soumilena	Black Steel	Fafage Vamos	4–4	12 March 2023
(Indonesia) Reza Gunawan	Cosmo JNE	Radit	4–6	13 May 2023
(Brazil) Diego Rodrigo	Black Steel	Unggul	6–3	13 May 2023
(Indonesia) G-Vin Laik	Unggul	Black Steel	6–3	13 May 2023
(Indonesia) Muhammad Fajriyan	Kancil WHW	Bintang Timur	4–4	13 May 2023
(Brazil) Marcus Gava	Kancil WHW	Unggul	6–2	21 May 2023
(Indonesia) Evan Soumilena	Black Steel	Pelindo Mutiara	6–0	8 July 2023
(Brazil) Daniel Alves^{5}	Kancil WHW	Sadakata United	8–4	9 July 2023
(Indonesia) Juniansyah	Radit	Fafage Vamos	7–2	9 July 2023
(Indonesia) Muhammad Ridwan	Giga	Sadakata United	3–0	22 July 2023
(Brazil) Dieguinho^{4}	Bintang Timur	Pelindo Mutiara	7–0	23 July 2023
(Brazil) Dieguinho^{5}	Bintang Timur	Giga	10–1	5 August 2023
(Indonesia) Evan Soumilena^{5}	Black Steel	Radit	10–2	5 August 2023
(Indonesia) Subhan Faidasa	Pendekar	Kancil WHW	7–8	6 August 2023

- ^{4}= scored 4 goals
- ^{5}= scored 5 goals

== Awards ==
=== End of season awards ===
Awards	Winner	Club	Ref.
Best Player	(Indonesia) M. Iqbal Iskandar	Bintang Timur	
Top Goal Scorer	(Indonesia) Evan Soumilena	Black Steel	
Fair Play Team	Unggul FC Malang		

== See also ==
- 2022–23 Indonesia Women's Pro Futsal League
