= Dieguinho (futsal player) =

Brazilian futsal player

Personal information
- Full name: Diego Henrique de Abreu Assis
- Date of birth: 22 June 1989 (age 37)
- Place of birth: Ribeirão das Neves, Brazil
- Height: 1.75 m (5 ft 9 in)
- Position: Flank

Team information
- Current team: Bintang Timur Surabaya
- Number: 10

Youth career
- 2000–2007: Minas

Senior career*
Years	Team	Apps	(Gls)
2007–2012	Minas		
2013	Dynamo Moskva		
2014–2016	Intelli		
2016–2019	Sporting CP	68	(47)
2019	Joinville		
2022–	Bintang Timur Surabaya		

International career
- Brazil
- * Club domestic league appearances and goals as of 00:00, 31 August 2019 (UTC)

Diego Henrique de Abreu Assis (born 22 June 1989), known as Dieguinho, is a Brazilian futsal player, who plays for Bintang Timur Surabaya.

== Honours ==
Intelli

- Copa Libertadores de Futsal: 2013

Sporting CP

- UEFA Futsal Champions League: 2018–19
- Campeonato Nacional da I Divisão de Futsal: 2017–18

Bintang Timur Surabaya

- Indonesia Pro Futsal League: 2022–2023, 2023–2024

Brazil

- Grand Prix de Futsal: 2018
