= Daniel Alves =

Daniel Alves or Dani Alves may refer to:

- Daniel Alves (rower) (born 1969), Portuguese rower
- Dani Alves (born 1983), Brazilian footballer
- Danny (footballer) (Daniel Miguel Alves Gomes, born 1983)
