= Indonesia Pro Futsal League =

Top league for futsal in Indonesia

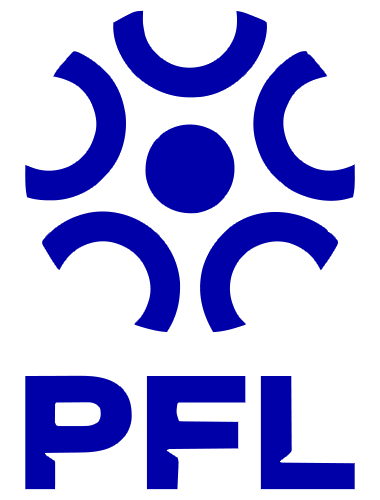
- Organising body: KFI
- Founded: 2006; 20 years ago as Indonesian Futsal League (IFL); 2016; 10 years ago as Indonesian Pro Futsal League (PFL)
- Country: Indonesia
- Confederation: AFC (Asia)
- Number of clubs: 12 (16 from 2026–27)
- Level on pyramid: 1
- Relegation to: Indonesia Pro Futsal League 2
- Domestic cup(s): Indonesia Futsal Nation Cup; Indonesia Futsal Super Cup
- International cup(s): AFC Futsal Club Championship; AFF Futsal Club Championship; Intercontinental Futsal Cup
- Current champions: Bintang Timur Surabaya (5th title) (2025–26)
- Most championships: Bintang Timur Surabaya (5 titles)
- Broadcaster(s): MNCTV; Soccer Channel; Sportstars; RCTI+; Vision+; Sportstars.id
- Website: https://pflindonesia.com/
- Current: 2025–26 Indonesia Pro Futsal League

Indonesia Pro Futsal League (Indonesian: Liga Futsal Profesional Indonesia) is the top league for men's futsal in Indonesia. It is organized by PT Kompetisi Futsal Indonesia (KFI), under the auspices of the Indonesia Futsal Federation (FFI). The league began in the 2006–07 season as Indonesia Futsal League or IFL (Indonesian: Liga Futsal Indonesia) with 6 inaugural clubs. This competition was held in conjunction with its women equivalent, the Indonesia Women's Pro Futsal League. The league's name was changed into its current form before the 2016 season began.

== History ==
The highest futsal league competition in Indonesia began in the 2006–07 season. At that time, the competition called "Liga Futsal Indonesia" was participated in by six different futsal clubs and was organized by the National Futsal Board under PSSI. The competition temporarily stopped in 2014 due to changes in the futsal organizing body from PSSI to a separate body, namely the Indonesian Futsal Association (now Indonesia Futsal Federation). In 2015, the futsal competition resumed under the name "Liga Super Futsal Indonesia". Since 2016 until the present day, the competition has been called "Liga Futsal Profesional Indonesia".

== Format ==
Since 2015, the league brought together sixteen Indonesian futsal clubs competing in two separate groups, A and B, each containing eight clubs. The two clubs with the highest points in each group would advance to a knockout stage to compete for the championship. However, since 2022, twelve clubs have competed in a single full round-robin competition with no knockout stage.

The winner of the Indonesia Pro Futsal League each season earns the right to represent Indonesia in the AFC Futsal Club Championship. The runner-up represents Indonesia in the AFF Futsal Club Championship. In 2026, the winner of the 2025–26 Pro Futsal League season will represent Asia at the Intercontinental Futsal Cup 2026 in Brazil.

The Pro Futsal League will gradually increase to 16 teams in the 2028–29 season, when a closed-league format based on participation licences will be introduced and the promotion and relegation system abolished.

== Teams ==
The following 12 clubs will be competing in the Indonesia Pro Futsal League during the 2025–26 season.

Team	City	Province
Asahan	Asahan	North Sumatra
Bintang Timur	Surabaya	East Java
Black Steel	Manokwari	West Papua
Cosmo JNE	Jakarta	Jakarta
Fafage Banua	Banjarmasin	South Kalimantan
Halus	Jakarta	Jakarta
Moncongbulo	Makassar	South Sulawesi
Kuda Laut Nusantara	Jakarta	Jakarta
Pangsuma	Pontianak	West Kalimantan
Raybit	Jakarta	Jakarta
Nanzaby	Bintan	Riau Islands
Unggul	Malang	East Java

== List of champions ==
=== Champions ===
Year	Champions	Runners-up	Third place	Ref.
2006–07	Biangbola	Mastrans Jakarta	Electric PLN	
2008	Electric PLN	Biangbola	IPC Pelindo II	
2009	Electric PLN	Biangbola	Mutiara Hitam	
2010	Harimau Rawa	Electric PLN	IPC Pelindo II	
2011	IPC Pelindo II	Electric PLN	Futsal Kota Bandung	
2012	IPC Pelindo II	Futsal Kota Bandung	Electric PLN	
2013	Electric PLN Cosmo	Futsal Kota Bandung	Tifosi Baskhara	
2015	IPC Pelindo II	Pinky Boys (Note: now as Permata Indah Manokwari)	Electric PLN	
2016	Black Steel Manokwari	Vamos Mataram	Biangbola	
2017	Vamos Mataram	Permata Indah Manokwari	Bintang Timur Surabaya	
2018	Vamos Mataram	SKN Kebumen	Permata Indah Manokwari	
2019	Vamos Mataram	Black Steel Manokwari	SKN Kebumen	
2020	Black Steel Manokwari	SKN Kebumen	Bintang Timur Surabaya	
2021–22	Bintang Timur Surabaya	Black Steel Manokwari	Cosmo JNE	
2022–23	Bintang Timur Surabaya	Kancil WHW	Black Steel Papua	
2023–24	Bintang Timur Surabaya	Black Steel Papua	Kancil WHW	
2024–25	Bintang Timur Surabaya	Black Steel Papua	Unggul	
2025–26	Bintang Timur Surabaya	Cosmo JNE	Black Steel Papua	

== List by performance ==
Club	Winners	Runners-up	Years won	Years runner-up
Bintang Timur Surabaya	5	0	2021–22, 2022–23, 2023–24, 2024–25, 2025–26	—
Electric PLN	3	2	2008, 2009, 2013	2010, 2011
Vamos Mataram	3	1	2017, 2018, 2019	2016
Pelindo	3	0	2011, 2012, 2015	—
Black Steel Papua	2	4	2016, 2020	2019, 2021–22, 2023–24, 2024–25
Biangbola	1	2	2006–07	2008, 2009
Harimau Rawa	1	0	2010	—
Futsal Kota Bandung	0	2	—	2012, 2013
Permata Indah Manokwari	0	2	—	2015, 2017
SKN Kebumen	0	2	—	2018, 2020
Kancil WHW	0	1	—	2022–23
Cosmo JNE	0	1	—	2025–26

== List of best player ==
Year	Player	Club	Ref.
2006–07	(Indonesia) Vennard Hutabarat	Mastrans	
2008	(Indonesia) Deni Handoyo	Biangbola	
2009	(Indonesia) Topas Pamungkas	Electric PLN	
2010	(Indonesia) Socrates Matulessy	Harimau Rawa	
2011	(Indonesia) Jaelani Ladjanibi	IPC Pelindo II	
2012	(Indonesia) Yos Adi Wicaksono	IPC Pelindo II	
2013	(Indonesia) Ardy Dwi Suwardi	Electric Cosmo PLN	
2015	(Indonesia) Yos Adi Wicaksono	IPC Pelindo II	
2016	(Indonesia) Ardiansyah Runtuboy	Black Steel Manokwari	
2017	(Indonesia) M. Iqbal Iskandar	Vamos Mataram	
2018	(Indonesia) M. Iqbal Iskandar	Vamos Mataram	
2019	(Indonesia) Marvin Alexa Wossiry	Vamos Mataram	
2020	(Indonesia) Evan Soumilena	Black Steel Manokwari	
2021–22	(Indonesia) Sunny Rizky Suhendra	Bintang Timur Surabaya	
2022–23	(Indonesia) M. Iqbal Iskandar	Bintang Timur Surabaya	
2023–24	(Indonesia) M. Iqbal Iskandar	Bintang Timur Surabaya	
2024–25	(Indonesia) Ardiansyah Nur	Black Steel Papua	
2025–26	(Indonesia) Firman Adriansyah	Bintang Timur Surabaya	

== Best young player ==
Year	Player	Club	Ref.
2024–25	(Brazil) Rodrigo Matheus	Black Steel Papua	
2025–26	(Indonesia) Reivan R.	Cosmo JNE	

== Best goalkeeper ==
Year	Player	Club	Ref.
2024–25	(Indonesia) Ahmad Habiebie	Bintang Timur Surabaya	
2025–26	(Indonesia) Ahmad Habiebie	Bintang Timur Surabaya	

== Best coach ==
Year	Coach	Club	Ref.
2024–25	(Spain) Diego Rios	Bintang Timur Surabaya	
2025–26	(Japan) Motonori Baba	Cosmo JNE	

== Most successful players ==
Player	Clubs	Titles
(Indonesia) M. Iqbal Iskandar	Black Steel Manokwari; Vamos Mataram; Bintang Timur Surabaya	8
(Indonesia) M. Nazil Purnama	Vamos Mataram; Bintang Timur Surabaya	7
(Indonesia) Ardiansyah Runtuboy	Black Steel Manokwari; Bintang Timur Surabaya	6
(Indonesia) Socrates Matulessy	Electric PLN; Harimau Rawa; IPC Pelindo II	5
(Indonesia) Jailani Ladjanibi	Electric PLN; Harimau Rawa; IPC Pelindo II	5

== List of top-goalscorers ==
Year	Scorer	Club	Goals	Ref.
2006–07	(Indonesia) Sayan Karmadi (Indonesia) Maulana Ihsan	Mastrans; Cosmo	18	
2008	(Indonesia) Achmad Syaibani	Biangbola	21	
2009	(Indonesia) Boi Boas	Mutiara Hitam	30	
2010	(Indonesia) Firman Septian	Limus IBM Jaya	20	
2011	(Indonesia) Sandy Gempur	IM Sriwijaya United	17	
2012	(Indonesia) Ardy Dwi Suwardy	Futsal Kota Bandung	17	
2013	(Indonesia) Andri Kustiawan	Futsal Kota Bandung	17	
2015	(Indonesia) Randy Satria	IPC Pelindo II	26	
2016	(Indonesia) Andri Kustiawan	Vamos Mataram	25	
2017	(Indonesia) Ardiansyah Runtuboy	Black Steel Manokwari	16	
2018	(Indonesia) Andri Kustiawan	Vamos Mataram	27	
2019	(Indonesia) Andri Kustiawan	Bintang Timur Surabaya	18	
2020	(Indonesia) Andri Kustiawan	Bintang Timur Surabaya	28	
2021–22	(Brazil) Diego Rodrigo	Black Steel Manokwari	26	
2022–23	(Indonesia) Evan Soumilena	Black Steel Papua	33	
2023–24	(Brazil) Diego Rodrigo	Fafage Banua	30	
2024–25	(Indonesia) Evan Soumilena	Fafage Banua	32	
2025–26	(Brazil) Wellington Pereira	Unggul	31	

== List of foreign players ==
Afghanistan

- Mahdi Norouzi
- Hamid Hossein

Argentina

- Facundo Schusterman

Azerbaijan

- Fineo De Araújo
- Thiago Bolinha

Brazil

- Carlos Eduardo
- Diego Rodrigo Menezes
- Dieguinho
- Henrique Di María
- Neguinho
- Thiago Moura de Oliveira
- Andres Josue Teran
- Caio Almeida
- Daniel Alves
- Diego Rodrigo
- Fellipe Huan Custodio De Medeiros
- Matheus Dos Reis Souza
- Rodrigo Matheus ('Tocha')
- Vinicius Costa Santos Sales
- Wellington Pereira
- Guilherme Rossatto
- Felipe Santos
- Gilvan Ferreira
- Matheus Reis
- Washington Luiz ('Pepita')

Iran

- Ali Abedin
- Ali Ebrahimi
- Ali Khalilvand
- Alireza Rafieipour
- Farhad Fakhimzadeh
- Hamed Khodaei
- Mohammad Geravand
- Mohammad Reza Kord
- Mohsen Montazami
- Mostafa Nazari
- Vahid Shafiei
- Zahra Gholizadeh

Japan

- Kaoru Morioka
- Ruan Nakamatsu
- Seiya Shimizu
- Takeshi Higuchi
- Tomoaki Watanabe

Malaysia

- Mohd Khairul Effendy
- Mohd Zuhairi

Netherlands

- Karim Mossaoui
- Khalid El Hattach
- Said Bouzambou

Paraguay

- Wilson Veiga Neto

Portugal

- Ricardinho

Serbia

- Darko Ristić

Thailand

- Chaivat Jamgrajang
- Ekkapan Suratsawang
- Jetsada Chudech
- Kritsada Wongkaeo
- Nattawut Madyalan
- Suphawut Thueanklang
- Visrut Sirawatjirapong

Uzbekistan

- Ashurbek Tulkinov

Wales

- Rico Zulkarnain

== Media coverage ==
=== Current ===
Broadcaster	Coverage	Year	Summary	Ref.
(Indonesia) MNC Media	Free-to-air TV	2012–present	Live matches on MNC TV. Selected matches broadcast co-simulcast with other MNC Group channels.	
(Indonesia) MNC Media	Pay TV	2012–present	Live matches available on MNC Vision (Sportstars channel).	
(Indonesia) MNC Media	Streaming	2012–present	Live matches available on RCTI+. Some matches also streamed live on the official MNC Sports YouTube channel.	
(Indonesia) YouTube	Streaming	2016–present	Selected matches and full highlights available on the official Pro Futsal League YouTube channel.	
(Indonesia) YouTube	Streaming	2016–present	Some matches also streamed live on the MNC Sports YouTube channel.	

=== Former ===
Year	Broadcaster			Ref.
Year	Free-to-air TV	Pay TV	Streaming	Ref.
2006–2011	(Indonesia) TPI/MNCTV	—N/a	—N/a	

== See also ==
- Indonesia Pro Futsal League 2
- Indonesia Women's Pro Futsal League
- Nusantara Futsal League
- Nusantara Women's Futsal League
- Indonesia national futsal team
