= 2023–24 Indonesia Pro Futsal League =

Futsal competition in Indonesia

Indonesia Pro Futsal League
- Season: 2023–24
- Dates: 18 November 2023 – 4 August 2024
- Champions: Bintang Timur Surabaya; 3rd PFL title
- Relegated: Kinantan; Giga FC
- AFC Futsal Club Championship: Bintang Timur Surabaya
- AFF Futsal Club Championship: Black Steel Manokwari
- Best player: (Indonesia) M. Iqbal Iskandar
- Top goalscorer: (Brazil) Diego Rodrigo (30 goals)

The 2023–24 Indonesia Pro Futsal League, is the 16th season of the Indonesia Pro Futsal League competition held by the Indonesia Futsal Federation, as well as the eighth season of futsal competition under the name Professional Futsal League. The season started on 18 November 2023. It scheduled to end on 4 August 2024.

Bintang Timur Surabaya are the defending champions. A total of 12 Indonesian futsal clubs will compete for the championship of this competition, with two clubs coming as the 2022–23 Nusantara Futsal League finalists, Moncongbulo and Kinantan.

== Teams ==
Twelve teams is competing in the league—the top ten teams from the previous season and the two teams promoted from the 2022–23 Nusantara Futsal League. Two promoted teams are Moncongbulo and Kinantan.

=== Name changes ===
- Fafage Vamos Banua changed its name by removing Vamos from its name to **Fafage Banua**.
- Moncongbulo Muda changed its name by removing Muda from its name to **Moncongbulo**.
- Giga FC Metro merged with Kasuarina Putra Papua FC and changed its name to **Kasuarina Giga**. The merger ended mid-season because Kasuarina did not hold their end of the agreement by not paying the players and the staffs six months after the merger, hence the club's name reverted to **Giga FC**.
City of Origins of the participating Clubs in the 2023–24 Indonesian Professional Futsal League competition.

=== Personnel and kits ===
Club	Headquarter	Head coach	Captain	Kit manufacturer
Bintang Timur	Surabaya	(Spain) Diego Ríos	(Indonesia) M. Iqbal Iskandar	(Indonesia) Noij
Black Steel	Manokwari	(Spain) Chema Jimenez	(Indonesia) Evan Soumilena	(Thailand) Imane
Cosmo JNE	Jakarta	(Indonesia) Deny Handoyo	(Indonesia) Dewa Rizki	(Indonesia) Mills
Fafage Banua	Banjarmasin	(Thailand) Pattaya Pienkum	(Indonesia) Sunny Rizki	(Indonesia) Mills
Giga	Metro	(Indonesia) Arif Kurniawan	(Indonesia) Andriansyah	(Indonesia) Almer
Halus	Jakarta	(Indonesia) Yolla Hendro	(Indonesia) Adytya	(Indonesia) Ghanior
Kancil WHW	Pontianak	(Indonesia) Wahyu Kocoy	(Indonesia) Diaz Riyansyah	(Indonesia) Classico
Kinantan	Medan	(Indonesia) Muhammad Triyoga	(Indonesia) Muhammad Fauzan	(Indonesia) ELTEN
Moncongbulo	Gowa	(Indonesia) Azhar Rahman	(Indonesia) Fhandy Permana	(Indonesia) Exito
Pendekar United	Jakarta	(Indonesia) Naim Hamid	(Indonesia) Subhan Faidasa	(Thailand) Imane
Sadakata United	Subulussalam	(Indonesia) Panca Fauzi	(Indonesia) Agung Rufei	(Indonesia) Trops
Unggul	Malang	(Portugal) João Almeida	(Indonesia) Ramadhan Zidani	(Indonesia) Debay

=== Foreign players ===
The Indonesia futsal federation has rules regarding foreign players. First, each team may register a maximum of 7 foreign players consisted of 2 senior players and 5 under-20 players on long contract. Second, every senior foreign player must have played with the national team of his home country. Third, teams can only field 3 foreign players on the pitch at the same time consisted of 2 senior players and 1 under-20 players.

- Players named in **bold** indicates the player was registered during the mid-season transfer window.
- Former players named in italics are players that were out of squad or left the club within the season, after the pre-season transfer window, or in the mid-season transfer window, and at least had one appearance.

Clubs	Player 1	Player 2	Player 3	Former Player
Bintang Timur	(Brazil) Dieguinho	(Brazil) Marcus Gava	-	-
Black Steel	(Russia) Rafael Pedro Ari Manu	(Brazil) Matheus	(Brazil) Rodrigo Matheus	-
Cosmo JNE	(Iran) Vahid Shafiei	(Iran) Mojtaba Hassanezhad	-	-
Fafage Banua	(Iran) Ali Abedin	(Brazil) Diego Rodrigo	-	-
Kasuarina Giga	-	-	-	-
Halus	-	-	-	-
Kancil WHW	(Brazil) Daniel Alves	(Azerbaijan) Felipe Santos	-	-
Kinantan	-	-	-	-
Moncongbulo	-	-	-	-
Pendekar United	(Colombia) Stiven Hernandez	-	-	(Iran) Hamidreza Rahanjam (Afghanistan) Reza Hosseeinpoor
Sadakata United	-	-	-	-
Unggul	(Venezuela) Andres Josue Teran	(Venezuela) Oscar Fernandez	(Brazil) Guilherme Rossatto	-

Notes

1. Under-20 foreign player

== Schedule and venue ==
This PFL season will start earlier than previous season on 18 November 2023 and end on 4 August 2024. Schedule and venue may change.

Week	Date	Venue
I	18–19 November 2023	GOR Tegal Selatan, Tegal
II	25–26 November 2023	GOR Tegal Selatan, Tegal
III	2–3 December 2023	GOR UNESA, Surabaya
IV	9–10 December 2023	GOR Tegal Selatan, Tegal
V	16–17 December 2023	GOR Ken Arok, Malang
VI	6–7 January 2024	GOR Pangsuma, Pontianak
VII	13–14 January 2024	GOR Pangsuma, Pontianak
VIII	20–21 January 2024	GOR GBK, Palu
IX	25–26 May 2024	GOR UGM, Yogyakarta
X	1–2 June 2024	GOR Tegal Selatan, Tegal
XI	15–16 June 2024	GOR UGM, Yogyakarta
XII	6–7 July 2024	GOR NAMBO, Tangerang
XIII	13–14 July 2024	GOR NAMBO, Tangerang
XIV	20–21 July 2024	GOR NAMBO, Tangerang
XV	27–28 July 2024	GOR UGM, Yogyakarta
XVI	3–4 August 2024	GOR Ken Arok, Malang

== League table ==
Pos	Team	Pld	W	D	L	GF	GA	GD	Pts	Qualification or relegation
1	Bintang Timur (Q)	22	17	5	0	89	31	+58	56	Qualified to AFC Futsal Club Championship
2	Black Steel (Q)	22	15	4	3	89	41	+48	49	Qualified to AFF Futsal Club Championship
3	Kancil WHW	22	15	3	4	100	60	+40	48	
4	Cosmo JNE	22	12	6	4	85	47	+38	42	
5	Unggul	22	12	4	6	75	55	+20	40	
6	Fafage Banua	22	12	3	7	83	64	+19	39	
7	Pendekar United	22	7	8	7	71	57	+14	29	
8	Halus	22	7	3	12	50	67	−17	24	
9	Moncongbulo	22	6	4	12	61	84	−23	22	
10	Sadakata United	22	3	4	15	44	82	−38	13	
11	Kinantan	22	3	0	19	34	102	−68	9	Relegated to Nusantara Futsal League
12	Giga	22	1	0	21	40	131	−91	3	Relegated to Nusantara Futsal League

Updated to match(es) played on 4 August 2024. Source: LFP 2023–24
(Q) Qualified for the phase indicated

== Results ==
Home \ Away	BIN	BLA	COS	FAF	GIG	HAL	KAN	KIN	MON	PEN	SAD	UNG
Bintang Timur	—	4–2	3–3	3–3	6–1	6–2	2–2	4–1	5–2	3–2	5–2	2–2
Black Steel	2–2	—	2–0	3–2	5–3	1–1	3–4	7–2	10–2	6–1	4–0	5–1
Cosmo JNE	0–5	1–1	—	2–3	9–1	5–1	3–2	8–1	7–1	3–3	2–2	3–2
Fafage Banua	1–3	2–4	1–7	—	5–1	3–5	7–5	4–1	4–1	2–2	4–2	2–2
Giga	2–10	1–7	2–4	2–9	—	2–5	1–8	1–2	3–6	1–9	3–8	0–6
Halus	0–4	1–5	3–6	1–2	2–4	—	1–2	2–0	3–3	2–0	5–2	1–2
Kancil WHW	0–4	7–6	6–3	7–6	6–2	4–1	—	7–1	7–1	2–2	6–0	2–6
Kinantan	0–5	2–4	1–6	3–4	4–3	3–6	0–4	—	1–4	1–3	3–5	2–6
Moncongbulo	1–3	1–2	3–3	4–10	7–0	0–2	3–4	5–3	—	4–2	2–2	2–4
Pendekar United	1–3	2–2	1–1	2–5	5–3	4–1	6–6	7–1	2–3	—	7–2	3–3
Sadakata United	0–3	1–5	0–4	1–2	6–2	4–4	0–5	0–1	2–2	0–4	—	4–5
Unggul	2–4	1–3	3–5	3–2	2–1	4–1	2–4	7–1	5–4	3–3	4–1	—

Updated to match(es) played on 4 August 2024. Source: LFP 2023–24
Legend: Blue = home team win; Yellow = draw; Red = away team win.
