= Mills (sports brand) =

Indonesian sports manufacturing brand

Mills Sport, Ltd
- Type: Limited
- Industry: Apparel; Sportswear; Sports Equipment
- Founded: 2018; 8 years ago
- Founder: Tjia Kong Hau
- Headquarters: Jakarta, Indonesia
- Area served: Worldwide
- Products: Football kits, goalkeeper gloves, boots, sportswear, basketball kits
- Website: mills.co.id

Mills Sport is an Indonesian sport manufacturing brand of the Mitra Kreasi Garmen, Ltd. The brand was established in 2018, and it is produces jerseys, sports outfits, training equipment, etc.
