= Evan Soumilena =

Indonesian futsal player

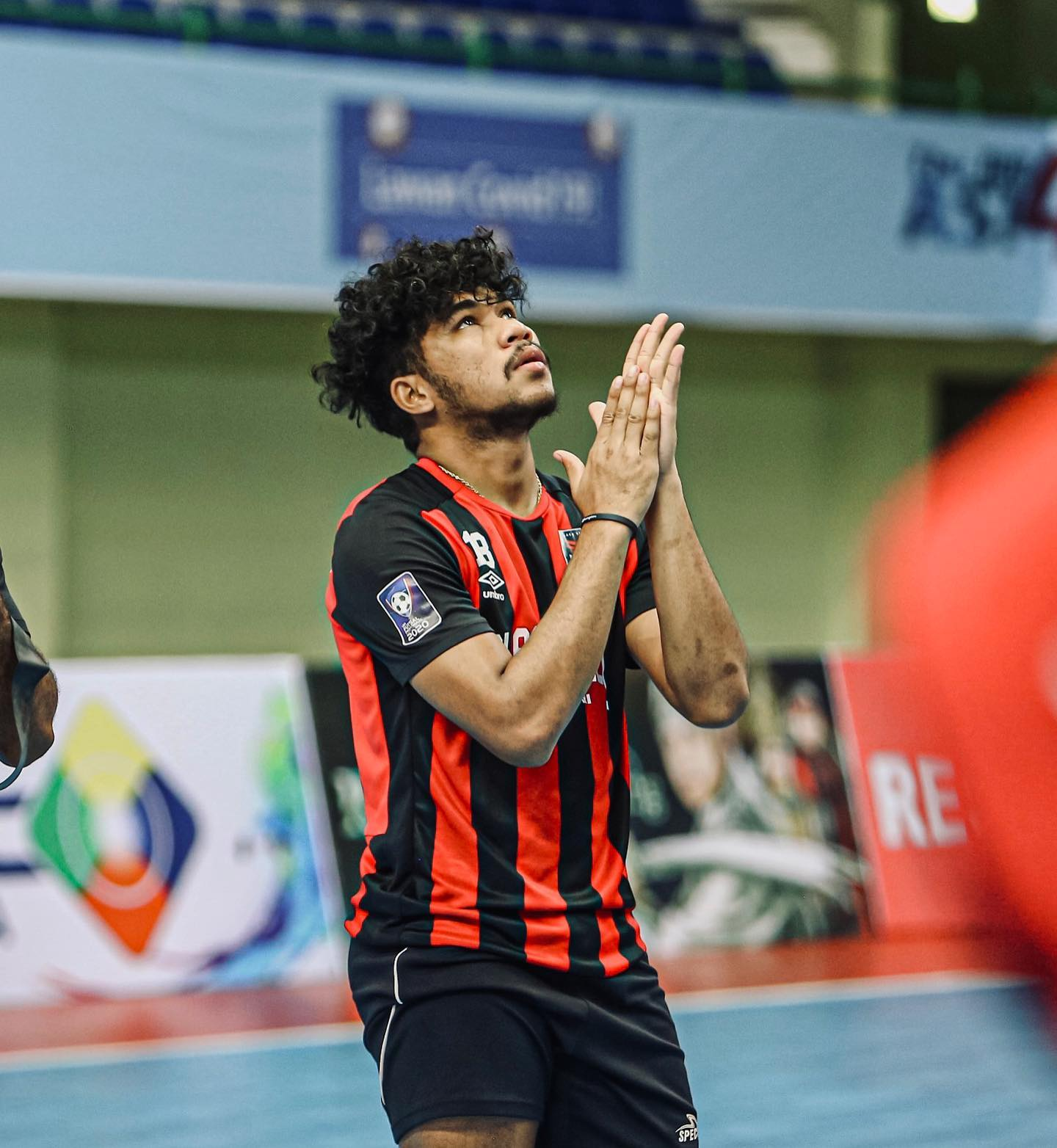
- Evan Soumilena at Black Steel Papua.

Personal information
- Full name: Holypaul Evan Septinus Soumilena
- Date of birth: 19 November 1996 (age 29)
- Place of birth: Papua, Indonesia
- Position: Pivot

Team information
- Current team: Fafage Banua
- Number: 18

Senior career*
Years	Team	Apps	(Gls)
2017–2023	Black Steel Papua		
2023	ADCR Caxinas Futsal	2	(1)
2023–2024	Black Steel Papua	7	(8)
2024–	Fafage Banua	24	(32)

International career^{‡}
2022–	Indonesia	15	(18)
Medal record
Men's futsal
Representing Indonesia
AFF Futsal Championship
Winner	2024 Nakhon Ratchasima	Team
Runner-up	2022 Bangkok	Team
Southeast Asian Games
Gold medal – first place	2025 Bangkok	Team
Silver medal – second place	2022 Hanoi	Team
- * Club domestic league appearances and goals as of 24 December 2023 ‡ National team caps and goals as of 7 October 2023

Holypaul Evan Septinus Soumilena (born 19 November 1996) is an Indonesian professional futsal player who plays for Indonesia Pro Futsal League club Fafage Banua.

== Club career ==
=== Black Steel Papua ===
Evan started his career as a professional futsal player since 2017 with Black Steel Papua (at that time it was still called Black Steel Manokwari). He won his first Indonesian futsal league title with Black Steel in the 2020 Indonesia Pro Futsal League season, scoring a hattrick in the final. He also won best player award that season.

In his last season with Black Steel, Evan brought the club to win the 2023 AFF Futsal Club Championship title with him becoming the top scorer for the tournament by scoring 7 goals in 4 matches. He also finished the 2022–23 PFL season by becoming top scorer of the league with record-breaking 33 goals, the most goals scored of any player in Indonesia futsal league history.

=== ADCR Caxinas ===
After he left Black Steel, Evan joins Liga Placard club ADCR Caxinas Futsal for one season. He said that Ricardinho, who was playing in Indonesia at the time, facilitated and helped him to make the move possible. He made his first assist for the club against Sporting CP in his second match. He scored his first goal, Caxinas sixth goal in their 10–0 win against Candoso on 15 October.

== International career ==
Evan started his international career for the Indonesia national futsal team at 2022 AFF Futsal Championship which was held in Thailand. In that tournament Evan scored 8 goals from 6 matches and brought his team to be runner-up after being defeated by Thailand national team in the final on penalties.

== Honours ==
=== Club ===
Black Steel Papua

- Champion in Indonesia Pro Futsal League: 2020
- Champion in AFF Futsal Club Championship: 2023

=== National team ===
Indonesia

- Champion in AFF Futsal Championship: 2024
- Champion in MNC Cup: 2022
- Gold Medal in Southeast Asian Games: 2025
- Runner-up in AFF Futsal Championship: 2022
- Silver Medal in Southeast Asian Games: 2022

=== Individual ===
- Best player in Indonesia Pro Futsal League: 2020
- Top scorer in Indonesia Pro Futsal League: 2022–23
- Top scorer in AFF Futsal Club Championship: 2023

== International goals ==
No.	Date	Venue	Opponent	Score	Result	Competition
1.	3 April 2022	Bangkok, Thailand	Brunei	1–0	12–0	2022 AFF Futsal Championship
2.	3 April 2022	Bangkok, Thailand	Brunei	2–0	12–0	2022 AFF Futsal Championship
3.	4 April 2022	Bangkok, Thailand	Malaysia	1–0	5–1	2022 AFF Futsal Championship
4.	4 April 2022	Bangkok, Thailand	Malaysia	5–1	5–1	2022 AFF Futsal Championship
5.	5 April 2022	Bangkok, Thailand	Thailand	1–0	2–2	2022 AFF Futsal Championship
6.	6 April 2022	Bangkok, Thailand	Cambodia	11–2	11–2	2022 AFF Futsal Championship
7.	8 April 2022	Bangkok, Thailand	Myanmar	2–0	6–1	2022 AFF Futsal Championship
8.	10 April 2022	Bangkok, Thailand	Thailand	1–0	2–2 (3–5 p)	2022 AFF Futsal Championship
9.	14 May 2022	Phủ Lý, Vietnam	Myanmar	4–0	6–0	2021 Southeast Asian Games
10.	14 May 2022	Phủ Lý, Vietnam	Myanmar	6–0	6–0	2021 Southeast Asian Games
11.	7 October 2023	Dammam, Saudi Arabia	Macau	9–0	12–0	2024 AFC Futsal Asian Cup qualification
12.	7 October 2023	Dammam, Saudi Arabia	Macau	10–0	12–0	2024 AFC Futsal Asian Cup qualification
13.	7 October 2023	Dammam, Saudi Arabia	Macau	12–0	12–0	2024 AFC Futsal Asian Cup qualification
14.	13 October 2024	Yogyakarta, Indonesia	Malaysia	3–0	6–0	Friendly
15.	13 October 2024	Yogyakarta, Indonesia	Malaysia	4–0	6–0	Friendly
16.	13 October 2024	Yogyakarta, Indonesia	Malaysia	5–0	6–0	Friendly
17.	5 November 2024	Nakhon Ratchasima, Thailand	Australia	1–0	3–1	2024 ASEAN Futsal Championship
18.	8 November 2024	Nakhon Ratchasima, Thailand	Thailand	1–0	5–1	2024 ASEAN Futsal Championship
