= Bintang Timur Surabaya Futsal Club =

Indonesian futsal club

Bintang Timur Surabaya
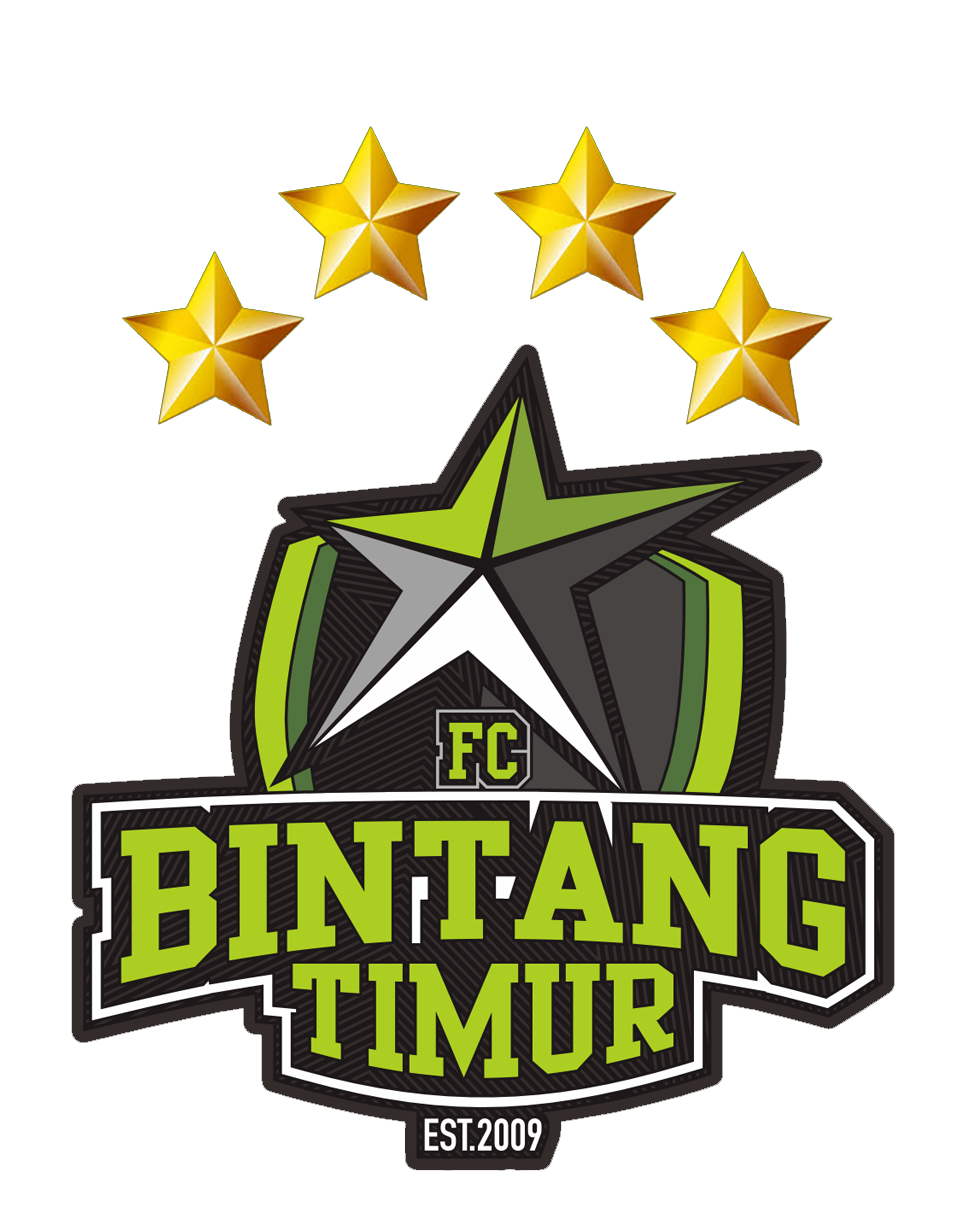
- Full name: Bintang Timur Futsal Club Surabaya
- Nickname: The Eastern Star
- Short name: BTS
- Founded: 13 July 2009; 17 years ago
- Ground: Bhaskara Futsal Arena, Surabaya, East Java
- Capacity: 1,200
- Owner: Dimas Bagus Kurniawan
- Chairman: Dimas Bagus Kurniawan
- Coach: Juan Francisco Fuentes Zamora
- League: Pro Futsal League
- 2025–26: PFL, 1st of 12 (champions)

Bintang Timur Futsal Club Surabaya, commonly known as Bintang Timur Surabaya or abbreviated as BTS, is an Indonesian professional futsal club based in Surabaya, East Java, Indonesia. The club competes in the Indonesia Pro Futsal League (PFL), the top tier of Indonesian professional futsal.

BTS is widely regarded as the most successful futsal club in Indonesian history, having won five consecutive Pro Futsal League titles from 2021–22 through 2025–26, as well as the inaugural 2022 AFF Futsal Cup, becoming the first Indonesian club to claim that title. As the 2025–26 PFL champions, BTS will represent Indonesia and Asia at the 2026 Intercontinental Futsal Cup in Pato Branco, Paraná, Brazil.

== History ==
=== Foundation ===
Bintang Timur Surabaya was founded on 13 July 2009 in Surabaya, East Java. The club is owned and chaired by Dimas Bagus Kurniawan, who previously served as head coach from 2015 to 2017 and has since been active as a manager of the Indonesia national futsal team.

In its early years, the club competed in the lower divisions of Indonesian futsal, gradually building its identity around Bhaskara Futsal Arena in Surabaya as its home ground.

=== Rise to dominance (2017–2022) ===
BTS first attracted national attention with a third-place finish in the 2016–17 Pro Futsal League, and again in 2019–20. The club began its ascent toward the top of Indonesian futsal in the 2021–22 season, finishing as champions for the first time under head coach Héctor Souto — clinching the PFL title with an unbeaten nine-match winning streak.

In 2022, BTS achieved an unprecedented double. After winning the PFL, the club represented Indonesia at the 2022 AFF Futsal Cup in Thailand and defeated Thai side Hongyen Thakam 4–2 in the final to become the first Indonesian club — and the first non-Thai club — to win the regional championship since its inaugural edition in 2015.

=== Five consecutive PFL titles (2022–2026) ===
Under a succession of coaches — Héctor Souto and then Diego Ríos — BTS maintained its dominance of Indonesian futsal. Diego Ríos guided the club to three consecutive PFL titles (2022–23, 2023–24, and 2024–25), including an unbeaten league campaign in 2023–24 (22 matches: 17 wins, 5 draws). During this period, BTS also won the inaugural 2024 Indonesia Futsal Super Cup, defeating Black Steel Papua 3–2 in the final at GOR Bung Karno, Sukoharjo, with goalkeeper Ahmad Habiebie named MVP.

For the 2025–26 season, Diego Ríos departed after three consecutive championships and was replaced by Spanish coach Juan Francisco Fuentes Zamora, who was announced via the club's official Instagram account. Despite significant squad turnover — including the departure of Brazilian players Pepita and Gilvan and several key locals — BTS continued their remarkable run, defeating Cosmo JNE 4–2 and 4–3 in the two-legged final at GOR Universitas Negeri Yogyakarta on 12 and 14 June 2026, to claim an historic fifth consecutive PFL title.

== Arena ==
BTS plays their home matches at Bhaskara Futsal Arena in Surabaya, East Java. The facility, which holds approximately 1,200 spectators, is owned and operated by Bhaskara and serves as both the club's home ground and training base. The arena has been BTS's home since the club's foundation and has seen all of the club's major trophy-winning moments.

== Players ==
=== Current squad ===
As of 14 February 2026

#	Position	Name	Nationality
1	Goalkeeper	Ahmad Habiebie	(Indonesia)
2	Goalkeeper	Andi Tenri Juang	(Indonesia)
3	Goalkeeper	Rizky Prima Ariansyah	(Indonesia)
4	Flank	Mochamad Iqbal Iskandar	(Indonesia)
5	Flank	Firman Adriansyah	(Indonesia)
6	Anchor	Rio Pangestu	(Indonesia)
7	Flank	Syauqi Saud Lubis	(Indonesia)
8	Anchor	Marcus Vinicius Gava	(Brazil)
9	Flank	Dieguinho	(Brazil)
10	Pivot	Rian Feisoto Gomes	(Brazil)
11	Flank	Gusti Dian Ardianto	(Indonesia)
12	Flank	Ardiansyah Runtuboy	(Indonesia)
13	Flank	Reka Cahya Puntoadi	(Indonesia)
14	Pivot	Muhammad Subhan Faidasa	(Indonesia)
15	Anchor	Anza Rizal Restuian Mas	(Indonesia)
16	Anchor	Septyan Dwi Chandra	(Indonesia)
17	Pivot	Salim Hanif Sungkar	(Indonesia)
18	Pivot	Samuel Eko Putra Tampubolon	(Indonesia)

== Personnel ==
=== Coaching staff ===
Position	Name
Head coach	(Spain) Juan Francisco Fuentes Zamora

== Kit colours ==
Bintang Timur Surabaya traditionally plays in dark navy and gold. The club's colours have remained broadly consistent throughout their history, with the crest of a golden Eastern Star (Bintang Timur) featuring prominently.

Period	Kit Manufacturer	Main Sponsor(s)
2015–2019	AZA	Unknown
2020	Mizuno	PT. KJS, AXA Mandiri, Bhaskara Futsal Arena, Hydro Coco, CV. Tanah Merah Nusantara, BEI, BNI
2021–2023	NOIJ	Bhaskara Futsal Arena, PT. Bara Manunggal Sakti
2023–present	NOIJ	Bhaskara Futsal Arena, Mitra Keluarga, Pocari Sweat

== Honours ==
=== Regional competitions ===
- AFF Futsal Cup: 1
  - 2022

=== National competitions ===
- Indonesia Pro Futsal League: 5
  - 2021–22, 2022–23, 2023–24, 2024–25, 2025–26
- Indonesia Futsal Super Cup: 2
  - 2024, 2026

=== Other achievements ===
National

- Indonesia Pro Futsal League
  - Third place (2): 2016–17, 2019–20

== Season-by-season records ==
Season	Division	Teams	Position	AFF FC	AFC FC	Super Cup
2016–17	Pro Futsal League	12	3rd	–	–	–
2019–20	Pro Futsal League	12	3rd	–	–	–
2021–22	Pro Futsal League	12	1st	–	–	–
2022–23	Pro Futsal League	12	1st	Winners	–	–
2023–24	Pro Futsal League	12	1st	–	–	–
2024–25	Pro Futsal League	12	1st	–	–	Winners
2025–26	Pro Futsal League	12	1st	–	–	4th
2026–27	Pro Futsal League	TBA		–	–	Winners

== Continental record ==
Season	Competition	Round	Opponent	Result
2022	AFF Futsal Cup	Final	(Thailand) Hongyen Thakam	W 4–2 (Champions)

== Former coaches ==
Years	Name
2015–2017	(Indonesia) Dimas Bagus Kurniawan
2017–2021	(Indonesia) (various)
2021–2022	(Spain) Héctor Souto
2022–2025	(Uruguay) Diego Ríos
2025–	(Spain) Juan Francisco Fuentes Zamora

== Notable players ==
The following is a list of notable former and current players strongly associated with Bintang Timur Surabaya.

- (Indonesia) Mochamad Iqbal Iskandar – Best Player, PFL 2022–23 & 2023–24
- (Indonesia) Sunny Rizky Suhendra – Best Player, PFL 2021–22
- Ahmad Habiebie – MVP, Indonesia Futsal Super Cup 2024
- (Indonesia) Syauqi Saud Lubis
- (Indonesia) Samuel Eko Putra Tampubolon
- (Indonesia) Rio Pangestu
- (Indonesia) Ardiansyah Runtuboy
- (Indonesia) Reka Cahya Puntoadi
- (Netherlands) Khalid El Hattach
- (Netherlands) Karim Mossaoui
- (Brazil) Washington Luiz "Pepita"
- (Brazil) Gilvan (Washington Gilvan)
- (Brazil) Diego Rodrigo – Top scorer, PFL 2021–22 (26 goals) & 2023–24 (30 goals)
