= Unggul Futsal Club =

Indonesian futsal club

Unggul FC
- Full name: Unggul Futsal Club Malang
- Founded: 2018; 8 years ago
- Ground: GOR Ken Arok; Unggul Sports Center
- Capacity: 5,000; 1,000
- Owner: Nicola Reza Samudra
- Head coach: (Portugal) João Almeida
- League: Pro Futsal League
- 2022–23: Indonesia Pro Futsal League, 7th
- Website: https://unggulfc.com

Unggul Futsal Club Malang is an Indonesian professional futsal club based in Malang, East Java. The club currently play in Indonesia Pro Futsal League after becoming the winner of Nusantara Futsal League season 2021–22.

== Honours ==
- Indonesia Pro Futsal League
  - Third place: 2024–25
- Nusantara Futsal League
  - Champions: 2021–22
- Nusantara Futsal League (East Java zone)
  - Champions: 2021–22
