= Pangsuma Futsal Club =

Indonesian futsal club

Pangsuma FC
- Full name: Pangsuma Futsal Club
- Founded: 2016; 10 years ago (as Kancil BBK FC); August 2024, 31; 18 months ago (as Pangsuma FC)
- Ground: GOR Pangsuma; Pontianak
- CEO: (Indonesia) Haryadi Zuriansyah
- League: Indonesia Pro Futsal League
- 2023–24: 3rd

Pangsuma Futsal Club, formerly known as Kancil WHW and Kancil BBK, is an Indonesian professional futsal club based in Pontianak, West Kalimantan. The club plays in the Indonesia Pro Futsal League.

== Achievements ==
- Indonesia Pro Futsal League
  - Runners-up: 2022–23
  - Third place: 2023–24
- Indonesia Futsal Nation Cup
  - Champions: 2025
  - Runners-up: 2026
- Nusantara Futsal League
  - Third-place: 2016–17
- South Kalimantan Governor Cup
  - Runners-up: 2022
