= Fafage Banua Futsal Club =

Indonesian futsal club

Fafage Banua
- Full name: Fafage Banua Futsal Club Banjarmasin
- Founded: 2012; 14 years ago as Vamos Mataram; 2022; 4 years ago as Fafage Banua
- Ground: GOR Babussalam; Banjarmasin
- Head Coach: (Indonesia) Sayan Karmadi
- League: Indonesia Pro Futsal League
- 2023–24: 6th

Fafage Banua Futsal Club, formerly known as Vamos Futsal Club Mataram, is a professional futsal club in Indonesia. Currently playing in the Indonesia Pro Futsal League, they are located in Banjarmasin, South Kalimantan. Their main arena is GOR Babussalam.

== Players ==
=== Current squad ===
As of 10 March 2020

Note: Flags indicate national team as defined under FIFA eligibility rules; some limited exceptions apply. Players may hold more than one non-FIFA nationality.

No.	Pos.	Nation	Player
1	GK	IDN	Yusuf Kurniawan
2	FW	IDN	Al Fajri Zikri
3	MF	IDN	Ari Ramdani
5	DF	IDN	Bagus Himawan
6	MF	IDN	Fachri Deriantama
7	MF	IDN	Anzar
8	DF	IDN	Marvin Alexa Wossiry
9	FW	IDN	Syahidansyah Lubis
10	MF	IDN	Nandy Sukmawijaya
11	FW	IDN	Dennis Guna Bawana

No.	Pos.	Nation	Player
12	GK	IDN	Muhammad Nizar
13	MF	IDN	Iqbal Aliefian
14	DF	IDN	Adolfo Christian Yembise
15	GK	IDN	Alfando Hareva
16	DF	IDN	I Kadek Oka Darma
17	MF	IDN	Joice Urianto Linuokas
18	MF	IDN	Mohamad Obay Hasan
20	DF	IRN	Hamed Khodaei

== Club Honours ==
=== National competitions ===
- Pro Futsal League
  - Champions: 2017, 2018, 2019
  - Runner-up: 2016
- Futsal Super Cup
  - Runner-up: 2025

=== Continental competitions ===
- AFC Futsal Club Championship
  - Quarter-finals: 2018, 2019
  - Group stage: 2017
