= Indonesia at the World Games =

- IOC code: INA
- NOC: Indonesian Olympic Committee
- Website: www.nocindonesia.id (in Indonesian)
- Medals Ranked 37th: Gold 9 Silver 8 Bronze 9 Total 26

World Games appearances (overview)
- 1981; 1985; 1989; 1993; 1997; 2001; 2005; 2009; 2013; 2017; 2022; 2025

Indonesia first participated in the World Games in 1981, and has sent athletes to compete in every World Games since then. The first medals won by Indonesia at the World Games was obtained in the 1981 edition in Santa Clara, United States. The medals consists of three bronzes won by badminton athletes Liem Swie King in men's singles, Hariamanto Kartono/Rudy Heryanto in men's doubles, and Christian Hadinata/Imelda Wiguna in mixed doubles.

The first gold medal won for the nation was by powerlifter Ventje Male who won the men's lightweight event in the 1989 World Games.

== Medal count ==
Games	Gold	Silver	Bronze	Total	Rank
(United States) 1981 Santa Clara	0	0	3	3	29
(United Kingdom) 1985 London	0	0	0	0	–
(Germany) 1989 Karlsruhe	1	0	4	5	18
(Netherlands) 1993 The Hague	0	0	0	0	–
(Finland) 1997 Lahti	1	1	0	2	31
(Japan) 2001 Akita	0	0	0	0	–
(Germany) 2005 Duisburg	0	0	0	0	–
(Chinese Taipei) 2009 Kaohsiung	1	0	1	2	33
(Colombia) 2013 Cali	0	0	0	0	–
(Poland) 2017 Wroclaw	0	0	0	0	–
(United States) 2022 Birmingham	2	3	0	5	25
(China) 2025 Chengdu	4	4	1	9	20
Total	9	8	9	26	

=== Medals by sport ===
Games	Gold	Silver	Bronze	Total
Dragon boat	3	2	0	5
Powerlifting	3	1	2	6
Wushu	1	3	0	4
Sport climbing	2	2	1	5
Bowling	0	0	1	1
Badminton	0	0	3	3
Taekwondo	0	0	2	2
Total	9	8	9	26

== Medalists ==
Medal	Name	Games	Sport	Event
Bronze	Liem Swie King	1981 Santa Clara	Badminton	Men's singles
Bronze	Hariamanto Kartono; Rudy Heryanto	1981 Santa Clara	Badminton	Men's doubles
Bronze	Christian Hadinata; Imelda Wiguna	1981 Santa Clara	Badminton	Mixed doubles
Gold	Ventje Male	1989 Karlsruhe	Powerlifting	Men's lightweight
Bronze	Hendro Pratono	1989 Karlsruhe	Bowling	Men's singles
Bronze	Nanda Talambanua	1989 Karlsruhe	Powerlifting	Men's lightweight
Bronze	Yefi Triaji	1989 Karlsruhe	Taekwondo	Men's 50 kg
Bronze	Lam Ting	1989 Karlsruhe	Taekwondo	Men's 70 kg
Gold	Tri Haryanto	1997 Lahti	Powerlifting	Men's middleweight
Silver	Sutrisno Bin Darimin	1997 Lahti	Powerlifting	Men's lightweight
Gold	Noviana Sari	2009 Kaohsiung	Powerlifting	Women's middleweight
Bronze	Sri Hartati	2009 Kaohsiung	Powerlifting	Women's lightweight
Gold	Edgar Xavier Marvelo	2022 Birmingham	Wushu	Men's changquan
Gold	Veddriq Leonardo	2022 Birmingham	Sport climbing	Men's speed
Silver	Harris Horatius	2022 Birmingham	Wushu	Men's nanquan and nangun
Silver	Nandhira Mauriskha	2022 Birmingham	Wushu	Women's changquan
Silver	Kiromal Katibin	2022 Birmingham	Sport climbing	Men's speed
Gold	Mixed team: Riska Andriyani Irwan Dapit Roby Kuswandi Dayumin Reski Wahyuni Maryati Sutrisno Nadia Hafiza Nur Meni	2025 Chengdu	Dragon boat	Open 8-seater 2000 metres
Gold	Mixed team: Riska Andriyani Irwan Dapit Roby Kuswandi Dayumin Reski Wahyuni Maryati Sutrisno Nadia Hafiza Nur Meni	2025 Chengdu	Dragon boat	Open 8-seater 200 metres
Gold	Mixed team: Riska Andriyani Mugi Harjito Irwan Dapit Roby Kuswandi Dayumin Reski Wahyuni Maryati Sutrisno Yuda Firmansyah Nadia Hafiza Nur Meni	2025 Chengdu	Dragon boat	Mixed 10-seater 500 metres
Gold	Desak Made Rita Kusuma Dewi	2025 Chengdu	Sport climbing	Women's speed single 4
Silver	Seraf Naro Siregar	2025 Chengdu	Wushu	Men's changquan/daoshu/gunshu
Silver	Mixed team: Riska Andriyani Irwan Dapit Roby Kuswandi Dayumin Reski Wahyuni Maryati Sutrisno Nadia Hafiza Nur Meni	2025 Chengdu	Dragon boat	Open 8-seater 500 metres
Silver	Mixed team: Riska Andriyani Mugi Harjito Irwan Dapit Roby Kuswandi Dayumin Reski Wahyuni Maryati Sutrisno Yuda Firmansyah Nadia Hafiza Nur Meni	2025 Chengdu	Dragon boat	Mixed 10-seater 2000 metres
Silver	Kiromal Katibin	2025 Chengdu	Sport climbing	Men's speed single 4
Bronze	Rajiah Sallsabillah	2025 Chengdu	Sport climbing	Women's speed single 4

=== Medals by individual ===
According to official data of the International World Games Association. This is a list of people who have won two or more World Games medals for Indonesia.

Athlete	Sport	Years	Gender	1st place, gold medalist(s)	2nd place, silver medalist(s)	3rd place, bronze medalist(s)	Total
Dapit	Dragon boat	2025	Men	3	2	0	5
Dayumin	Dragon boat	2025	Women	3	2	0	5
Irwan	Dragon boat	2025	Men	3	2	0	5
Maryati	Dragon boat	2025	Women	3	2	0	5
Nadia Hafiza	Dragon boat	2025	Women	3	2	0	5
Nur Meni	Dragon boat	2025	Women	3	2	0	5
Reski Wahyuni	Dragon boat	2025	Women	3	2	0	5
Riska Andriyani	Dragon boat	2025	Women	3	2	0	5
Roby Kuswandi	Dragon boat	2025	Men	3	2	0	5
Sutrisno	Dragon boat	2025	Men	3	2	0	5
Mugi Harjito	Dragon boat	2025	Men	1	1	0	2
Yuda Firmansyah	Dragon boat	2025	Men	1	1	0	2
Kiromal Katibin	Sport climbing	2022–2025	Men	0	2	0	2

== See also ==
- Olympic Games
- Paralympic Games
- Indonesia at the Olympics
- Indonesia at the Paralympics
- Indonesia at the Deaflympics
- Indonesia at the Youth Olympics
- Indonesia at the Asian Games
- Indonesia at the Asian Para Games
- Indonesia at the Asian Youth Games
- Indonesia at the SEA Games
- Indonesia at the ASEAN Para Games
- Indonesia at the Islamic Solidarity Games
- Indonesia at the FIFA World Cup
- Indonesia at the AFC Asian Cup
- ASEAN University Games
- ASEAN School Games
- GANEFO
- Sports in Indonesia
