= Indonesia at the Asian Youth Games =

- IOC code: INA
- NOC: Indonesian Olympic Committee
- Medals Ranked 17th: Gold 5 Silver 8 Bronze 21 Total 34

Asian Youth Games appearances (overview)
- 2009; 2013; 2025

Indonesia first participated in the Asian Youth Games in 2009 Singapore, with forty four contingents, 2013 Nanjing China with 103 contingents and 2025 Manama Bahrain with 123 contingents.

== Medals by games ==
Games	Rank	Gold	Silver	Bronze	Total
2009 Singapore	21	0	0	1	1
(China) 2013 Nanjing	15	1	2	2	5
(Bahrain) 2025 Manama	15	4	6	18	28
Total	17	5	8	21	34

== Medals by sport ==
Sport	Gold	Silver	Bronze	Total
Swimming	1	3	4	8
Pencak silat	1	1	0	2
Weightlifting	1	0	2	3
Badminton	1	0	1	2
Judo	1	0	0	1
Athletics	0	1	2	3
Triathlon	0	1	1	2
Esports	0	1	0	1
Volleyball	0	1	0	1
Mixed martial arts	0	0	4	4
Beach volleyball	0	0	2	2
Golf	0	0	2	2
Taekwondo	0	0	2	2
Teqball	0	0	1	1
Total	5	8	21	34

== Medalists ==
Medal	Name	Games	Sport	Event
Bronze	Ade Candra Rachmawan; I Gede Eka Agustiawan	Beach volleyball	Boys' team	1–5 July 2009
Gold	Ricky Anggawijaya	Swimming	100 m backstroke	19–23 August 2013
Silver	Ricky Anggawijaya	Swimming	200 m backstroke	19–23 August 2013
Silver	Aprilia Kartina	Athletics	1500 m	19–22 August 2013
Bronze	Monalisa Arieswati	Swimming	200 m butterfly	19–23 August 2013
Bronze	Ken Ayuthaya Purnama	Athletics	100 m hurdles	19–22 August 2013
Gold	Furgon Habbil Winata	Pencak silat	Boys' 51–55 kg	20 October 2025
Gold	Muhammad Rijal Abdillah	Weightlifting	Boys' –60 kg (Clean & Jerk)	26 October 2025
Gold	Raihan Pramono; Atresia Naufa Candani	Badminton	Mixed doubles	30 October 2025
Gold	Sashenka Fatimah	Judo	Girls' –63 kg	30 October 2025
Silver	Qiken Dwi Tata Olifia	Pencak silat	Girls' 51–55 kg	20 October 2025
Silver	Aira Martha Ardistri; Wahyu Tri Utomo Sembiring; Maurizka Nur Azizah; Keannan Fathir Arrashy Rolland	Triathlon	Mixed team relay super sprint	25 October 2025
Silver	Michael Julius Cezar	Esports	Boys' eFootball	26 October 2025
Silver	Reynard Delian Purwanto; Kevin Erlangga Prayitno; Mochamad Akbar Putra Taufik; Samuel Maxson Septionus	Swimming	Boys' 4 × 100 m freestyle relay	27 October 2025
Silver	Adelia Chantika Aulia	Swimming	Girls' 100 m backstroke	29 October 2025
Silver	Sulastri Rahma Aulia; Tina Syifa Sabila Salim; Syelomitha Avrilaviza Wongkar; Tazma Aprilia; Syabilla Hilal Ramadhan; Agni Sakina Rahmi; Shakira Ayu Tirta Wijaya; Calista Maya Ersandita; Naisya Pratama Putri; Wa Ode Ardiana; Chelsa Berliana Nurtomo; Azzahra Dwi Febyane	Volleyball	Girls' team	29 October 2025
Bronze	Zahrotus Syifa	Teqball	Girls' singles	23 October 2025
Bronze	Aira Martha Ardistri	Triathlon	Girls' individual super sprint	23 October 2025
Bronze	Manayra Maritza Siagian	Mixed martial arts	Girls' 45 kg modern	24 October 2025
Bronze	Bumi Magani Abraar Himara	Mixed martial arts	Boys' 55 kg modern	24 October 2025
Bronze	Satria Eka Suryo Basroni	Mixed martial arts	Boys' 60 kg traditional	24 October 2025
Bronze	Gibran Alfarizi	Mixed martial arts	Boys' 65 kg traditional	24 October 2025
Bronze	Queenita Keisha Azzahra	Taekwondo	Girls' –49 kg	25 October 2025
Bronze	Gendis Aulia Syafitri	Athletics	Girls' 500 m	26 October 2025
Bronze	Theodore Citoputra; Wiliam Wijaya; Jayawardana Dornan	Golf	Boys' team	26 October 2025
Bronze	Jayawardana Dornan	Golf	Boys' individual	26 October 2025
Bronze	Kavka Zhafif Putrawitama	Taekwondo	Boys' –63 kg	26 October 2025
Bronze	Hafiyan Azam Nuruddin; Fairuz Bayhaqly	Beach volleyball	Boys' team	26 October 2025
Bronze	Yoshie Honda; Natasha Angelina Oeoen; Chelsea Alexandra; Adelia Chantika Aulia	Swimming	Girls' 4 × 100 m freestyle relay	27 October 2025
Bronze	Chelsea Alexandra	Swimming	Girls' 50 m backstroke	28 October 2025
Bronze	Fardhan Rainanda Joe	Badminton	Boys' singles	29 October 2025
Bronze	Alyamaulida Kartika Pertiwi	Weightlifting	Girls' –77 kg (Snatch)	30 October 2025
Bronze	Alyamaulida Kartika Pertiwi	Weightlifting	Girls' –77 kg (Clean & Jerk)	30 October 2025
Bronze	Michelle Surjadi Fang	Swimming	Girls' 200 m butterfly	30 October 2025

== See also ==
- Indonesia at the Olympics
- Indonesia at the Paralympics
- Indonesia at the Deaflympics
- Indonesia at the Youth Olympics
- Indonesia at the World Games
- Indonesia at the Asian Games
- Indonesia at the Asian Para Games
- Indonesia at the SEA Games
- Indonesia at the ASEAN Para Games
- Indonesia at the FIFA World Cup
- Indonesia at the AFC Asian Cup
- GANEFO
- ASEAN University Games
- ASEAN School Games
- Sports in Indonesia
