= Indonesia at the Islamic Solidarity Games =

- IOC code: INA
- NOC: Indonesian Olympic Committee
- Website: www.nocindonesia.id (in Indonesian)
- Medals Ranked 6th: Gold 60 Silver 90 Bronze 97 Total 247

Islamic Solidarity Games appearances (overview)
- 2005; 2013; 2017; 2021; 2025

Indonesia first participated at the Islamic Solidarity Games in 2005 and has sent athletes to compete in every Islamic Solidarity Games since. As of 2022, Indonesian athletes have won a total of 222 medals at the games, making it one of the top nations.

== Hosted Games ==
Palembang, capital city of South Sumatra, hosted Islamic Solidarity Games in 2013.Indonesia was announced as the host for the Games in April 2011 with Pekanbaru, Riau, as the host city. However, the Games were then relocated to Jakarta citing lack of standard at some venues. Palembang was finally selected as the host city and the Games were delayed about three months from the original timeframe in June.

== Medals ==
=== Medals by games ===
*Red border color indicates tournament was held on home soil.

All-time Medal Tally
Games	Athletes	1st place, gold medalist(s)	2nd place, silver medalist(s)	3rd place, bronze medalist(s)	Total	Rank
(Saudi Arabia) 2005 Mecca		1	1	2	4	18th
(Indonesia) 2013 Palembang	345	36	34	34	104	1st
(Azerbaijan) 2017 Baku	127	6	29	23	58	8th
(Turkey) 2021 Konya	82	13	14	29	56	7th
(Saudi Arabia) 2025 Riyadh	37	4	12	9	25	13th
Total		60	90	97	247	6th

=== Medals by sport ===
Sport	Gold	Silver	Bronze	Total
Weightlifting	24	20	13	57
Swimming	10	31	38	79
Wushu	9	6	3	18
Tennis	5	4	1	10
Taekwondo	4	5	7	16
Archery	3	7	4	14
Athletics	2	7	4	13
Beach volleyball	1	2	0	3
Karate	1	0	12	13
Basketball	1	0	1	2
Badminton	0	3	6	9
Diving	0	3	1	4
Cycling	0	1	0	1
Football	0	1	0	1
Gymnastics	0	0	3	3
Fencing	0	0	2	2
Kickboxing	0	0	2	2
Totals (17 entries)	60	90	97	247

== Flag bearers ==
Games	Flag bearer	Sport
(Azerbaijan) 2017 Baku	I Gede Siman Sudartawa	Swimming
(Turkey) 2021 Konya	Osanando Naufal Khairudin	Taekwondo
(Saudi Arabia) 2025 Riyadh	Flairene Candrea	Swimming

== See also ==
- Indonesia at the Olympics
- Indonesia at the Paralympics
- Indonesia at the Deaflympics
- Indonesia at the Youth Olympics
- Indonesia at the World Games
- Indonesia at the Asian Games
- Indonesia at the Asian Para Games
- Indonesia at the Asian Youth Games
- Indonesia at the SEA Games
- Indonesia at the ASEAN Para Games
- Indonesia at the FIFA World Cup
- Indonesia at the AFC Asian Cup
- GANEFO
- ASEAN University Games
- ASEAN School Games
- Sports in Indonesia
