= Indonesia at the Asian Games =

- IOC code: INA
- NOC: Indonesian Olympic Committee
- Website: www.nocindonesia.or.id (in English)
- Medals Ranked 11th: Gold 103 Silver 141 Bronze 287 Total 531

Summer appearances
- 1951; 1954; 1958; 1962; 1966; 1970; 1974; 1978; 1982; 1986; 1990; 1994; 1998; 2002; 2006; 2010; 2014; 2018; 2022; 2026

Winter appearances
- 2017; 2025; 2029

Indonesia is a member of the Southeast Asian Zone of the Olympic Council of Asia (OCA), and has competed in all editions of the Asian Games since it was first held in 1951, one of only seven countries to do so. The Indonesian Olympic Committee, the National Olympic Committee for Indonesia, was founded on 19 January 1947, with Sri Sultan Hamengkubuwono IX as its first president. It was recognized in 1952 by the International Olympic Committee.

== Background ==
Indonesia is a member of the Southeast Asian Zone of the Olympic Council of Asia, the governing body of all the sports in Asia, recognized by the International Olympic Committee as the continental association of Asia. Being a member of Southeast Asian Zone, Indonesia also participates in the SEA Games, sub-regional Games for Southeast Asia.

The Olympic Council of Asia organises five major continental-level multi-sport events: the Asian Summer Games (which are commonly known as the Asian Games), Asian Winter Games, Asian Indoor-Martial Arts Games, Asian Beach Games, and Asian Youth Games. Before 2009, Indoor and Martial Arts were two separate events for indoor and martial arts sports respectively. However, the Olympic Council of Asia has since amalgamated them into a single event, the Asian Indoor-Martial Arts Games, which was debuted in 2013 in Incheon, South Korea. As a member of Olympic Council of Asia, Indonesia is privileged to participate in all these multi-sport events.

The Southeast Asian Zone itself holds strategic importance within the Olympic Council of Asia structure, as it comprises 11 nations with a combined population of over 680 million and a rapidly growing sports industry. The SEA Games serve not only as a sub-regional competition but also as a vital qualification pathway and talent development platform for athletes aiming to compete at the higher Asian Games and Olympic Games level. For Indonesia, the SEA Games has historically been a barometer of its national sports development, with its performance often reflecting the effectiveness of its long-term athlete training program under the Indonesian Olympic Committee.

Furthermore, Indonesia's active participation extends beyond competing to hosting major Olympic Council of Asia events. Indonesia hosted the inaugural Asian Beach Games in Bali in 2008 and co-hosted the Asian Games twice, 1962 in Jakarta and 2018 in Jakarta–Palembang. This dual role as both a participant and a host underscores Indonesia's commitment to the Olympic Council of Asia's mission of promoting the Olympic movement and fostering unity through sports across the continent.

== Hosted Asian Games ==
Jakarta, the national capital of Indonesia, has hosted the Asian Games in 1962 Asian Games and the 2018 Asian Games with Palembang. In 2018, for the first time, the Summer Asian Games were co-hosted by two regions. On 23 May 1958, voting for the 1962 host took place in Tokyo, Japan, before the 1958 Asian Games. The Asian Games Federation council voted 22–20 in favour of the Indonesian capital over Pakistani city of Karachi, the only other candidate.

To continue the history with the 2018 bidding process, it was quite different from the close 1962 vote. Initially Hanoi, Vietnam had won the bid on 8 November 2012 in Macau, beating Surabaya, Indonesia and Dubai. Hanoi was supposed to host the Games in 2019 as a preparation for the Tokyo 2020 Olympics. However on 17 April 2014, Vietnamese Prime Minister Nguyễn Tấn Dũng officially announced Hanoi's withdrawal, citing unpreparedness and economic recession as the main reasons, saying the country was unable to afford the construction of facilities and venues. No penalty was imposed for the withdrawal.

After that withdrawal, the Olympic Council of Asia announced a second round of bidding. Indonesia, China and the United Arab Emirates were considered as major candidates. Indonesia was widely regarded as the favourite since Surabaya was the runner-up of the previous bid. In early May 2014, the Olympic Council of Asia visited several Indonesian cities including Jakarta, Surabaya, Bandung and Palembang. Surabaya then decided to drop its own bid to focus on the 2021 Asian Youth Games.

Finally on 25 July 2014, during a meeting in Kuwait City, the Olympic Council of Asia appointed Jakarta as the host with Palembang as the supporting host, noting Jakarta's well-equipped sports facilities and adequate transportation and lodging. On 20 September 2014, Indonesia signed the host city contract and was ceremonially appointed host during the closing ceremony of the 2014 Asian Games in Incheon. Indonesia itself requested the Games be moved forward from 2019 to 2018 because 2019 was Indonesia's general election year. This led to the first time the Summer Asian Games were co-hosted by two regions, Jakarta and Palembang.

== Asian Games ==
With 492 medals, Indonesia is currently on 11th rank in all times Asian Games medal table. Highest achievement of Indonesia was in 2018 Asian Games at Jakarta and Palembang with 31 golds and 98 total medals. All this medal table refers to Olympic Council of Asia official website.

*Red border color indicates tournament was held on home soil.

=== Medals by games ===
Games	Athletes	Gold	Silver	Bronze	Total	Rank
(India) 1951 New Delhi	35	0	0	5	5	7
(Philippines) 1954 Manila	85	0	0	3	3	12
(Japan) 1958 Tokyo	66	0	0	6	6	14
(Indonesia) 1962 Jakarta	285	11	12	28	51	2
(Thailand) 1966 Bangkok	257	5	5	12	22	7
(Thailand) 1970 Bangkok	95	2	5	13	20	9
(Iran) 1974 Tehran	21	3	4	4	11	9
(Thailand) 1978 Bangkok	104	8	7	18	33	7
(India) 1982 New Delhi	170	4	4	7	15	6
(South Korea) 1986 Seoul	205	1	5	14	20	9
(China) 1990 Beijing	152	3	6	21	30	7
(Japan) 1994 Hiroshima	117	3	12	11	26	11
(Thailand) 1998 Bangkok	213	6	10	11	27	11
(South Korea) 2002 Busan	102	4	7	12	23	14
(Qatar) 2006 Doha	140	2	4	14	20	22
(China) 2010 Guangzhou	216	4	9	13	26	15
(South Korea) 2014 Incheon	186	4	5	11	20	17
(Indonesia) 2018 Jakarta–Palembang	938	31	24	43	98	4
(China) 2022 Hangzhou	415	7	11	18	36	13
(Japan) 2026 Aichi–Nagoya	432	5	11	23	39	16
Total	4,234	103	141	287	531	11

- Gold
- Silver
- Bronze

=== Medals by sport ===
Sport	Rank	Gold	Silver	Bronze	Total
Archery	6	1	3	4	7
Athletics	20	4	3	15	22
Badminton	2	30	28	47	105
Beach volleyball	6	0	4	4	8
Bodybuilding	12	0	2	0	2
Bowling	10	1	3	4	8
Boxing	12	3	8	15	26
Bridge	7	0	0	4	4
Canoeing	9	0	3	2	5
Cue sports	14	0	0	1	1
Cycling	7	6	5	7	18
Diving	5	1	1	4	6
Dragon boat	2	4	9	2	15
Equestrian	16	0	0	1	1
Esports	9	0	2	0	2
Fencing	8	0	1	2	3
Football	17	0	0	1	1
Gymnastics	11	0	1	1	2
Jet ski	2	1	1	1	3
Judo	20	0	0	1	1
Karate	8	3	7	15	25
Kurash	14	0	0	1	1
Padel	3	0	1	1	2
Paragliding	1	2	1	3	6
Pencak silat	1	14	0	1	15
Roller sports	6	0	3	2	5
Rowing	8	1	5	10	16
Sailing	9	2	1	3	6
Sepak takraw	6	1	4	15	20
Shooting	14	2	3	6	11
Soft tennis	5	0	2	6	8
Sport climbing	1	5	4	3	11
Surfing	2	0	1	0	1
Swimming	16	0	6	30	36
Table tennis	9	0	1	0	1
Taekwondo	10	1	6	8	15
Tennis	4	15	5	22	42
Teqball	5	0	1	1	2
Volleyball	8	0	0	2	2
Water polo	7	0	1	4	5
Weightlifting	8	3	8	15	26
Wrestling	20	0	0	2	2
Wushu	5	3	6	13	22
Total	11	103	141	287	531

== Asian Winter Games ==
Indonesia first competed at the Asian Winter Games in 2017 Asian Winter Games in Sapporo.

=== Medals by games ===
Games	Rank	Gold	Silver	Bronze	Total
(Japan) 2017 Sapporo	−	0	0	0	0
(China) 2025 Harbin	−	0	0	0	0
Total	−	0	0	0	0

== Asian Beach Games ==
The 1st Asian Beach Games were held in Bali, Indonesia from 18 October to 26 October 2008, Indonesia was on top of the medal tally with 23 gold, 8 silver, and 20 bronze medals.

*Red border color indicates tournament was held on home soil.

=== Medals by games ===
Games	Rank	Gold	Silver	Bronze	Total
(Indonesia) 2008 Bali	1	23	8	20	51
(Oman) 2010 Muscat	5	3	2	6	11
(China) 2012 Haiyang	4	6	6	4	16
(Thailand) 2014 Phuket	7	7	7	14	28
(Vietnam) 2016 Da Nang	11	3	5	9	17
(China) 2026 Sanya	11	1	2	0	3
Total	4	43	30	53	126

== Asian Indoor and Martial Arts Games ==
=== Medals by games ===
Games	Rank	Gold	Silver	Bronze	Total
Asian Indoor Games
(Thailand) 2005 Bangkok	14	1	1	2	4
2007 Macau	15	2	0	4	6
(Vietnam) 2009 Hanoi	9	6	3	14	23
Asian Martial Arts Games
(Thailand) 2009 Bangkok	7	5	6	5	16
Asian Indoor and Martial Arts Games
(South Korea) 2013 Incheon	19	0	2	3	5
(Turkmenistan) 2017 Ashgabat	21	2	4	14	20
(Saudi Arabia) 2026 Riyadh	Future event				
Total	13	16	16	42	74

== See also ==
- Indonesia at the Olympics
- Indonesia at the Paralympics
- Indonesia at the Deaflympics
- Indonesia at the Youth Olympics
- Indonesia at the World Games
- Indonesia at the Asian Para Games
- Indonesia at the Asian Youth Games
- Indonesia at the SEA Games
- Indonesia at the ASEAN Para Games
- Indonesia at the Islamic Solidarity Games
- Indonesia at the FIFA World Cup
- Indonesia at the AFC Asian Cup
- ASEAN University Games
- ASEAN School Games
- GANEFO
- Sports in Indonesia
