= Indonesia at the ASEAN Para Games =

- IPC code: INA
- NPC: National Paralympic Committee of Indonesia
- Website: paralympic.org.in
- Medals Ranked 2nd: Gold 996 Silver 853 Bronze 648 Total 2,497

ASEAN Para Games appearances (overview)
- 2001; 2003; 2005; 2008; 2009; 2011; 2014; 2015; 2017; 2022; 2023; 2025

Indonesia has competed at every edition of the ASEAN Para Games which was first held in Kuala Lumpur, Malaysia in 2001 ASEAN Para Games. Indonesia has hosted the games 2 times, first in 2011, again in 2022.

The 11th ASEAN Para Games originally set to be hosted by Vietnam in 2021, the Games were initially cancelled due to the COVID-19 pandemic just before its hosting rights were transferred to Indonesia. It is also originally scheduled from 23 to 30 July 2022, later moved to 30 July to 6 August 2022. Indonesia was the overall champion in the 2014, 2017, 2022, and 2023 editions.

== Medal tables ==
*Red border color indicates tournament was held on home soil.

=== Medals by Games ===
Games	Rank	Gold	Silver	Bronze	Total
(Malaysia) 2001 Kuala Lumpur	6	6	5	7	18
(Vietnam) 2003 Hanoi	5	10	11	18	39
(Philippines) 2005 Manila	4	30	26	20	76
(Thailand) 2008 Nakhon Ratchasima	4	33	25	18	76
(Malaysia) 2009 Kuala Lumpur	4	29	25	19	73
(Indonesia) 2011 Surakarta	2	113	108	89	310
(Myanmar) 2014 Naypyidaw	1	99	69	49	217
2015 Singapore	2	81	74	63	218
(Malaysia) 2017 Kuala Lumpur	1	126	75	50	251
2020 Philippines	Cancelled due to the COVID-19 pandemic				
(Indonesia) 2022 Surakarta	1	175	141	110	428
(Cambodia) 2023 Phnom Penh	1	159	148	94	401
(Thailand) 2025 Nakhon Ratchasima	2	135	143	114	392
Total	2	996	853	648	2497

== See also ==
- Olympic Games
- Paralympic Games
- Indonesia at the Olympics
- Indonesia at the Paralympics
- Indonesia at the Deaflympics
- Indonesia at the Youth Olympics
- Indonesia at the World Games
- Indonesia at the Asian Games
- Indonesia at the Asian Para Games
- Indonesia at the Asian Youth Games
- Indonesia at the SEA Games
- Indonesia at the Islamic Solidarity Games
- GANEFO
- ASEAN University Games
- ASEAN School Games
- Sports in Indonesia
