= Indonesia at the Olympics =

- IOC code: INA
- NOC: Indonesian Olympic Committee
- Website: www.nocindonesia.id (in Indonesian)
- Medals Ranked 56th: Gold 10 Silver 14 Bronze 16 Total 40

Summer appearances
- 1952; 1956; 1960; 1964; 1968; 1972; 1976; 1980; 1984; 1988; 1992; 1996; 2000; 2004; 2008; 2012; 2016; 2020; 2024; 2028

Other related appearances
- Individual Olympic Athletes (2000); Timor-Leste (2004–pres.)

Indonesia first participated in the Olympic Games in 1952 and has sent athletes to compete in every Summer Olympic Games since then, except for two; in 1964 due to controversy around the 1962 Asian Games when they banned Israel and the then-internationally recognized Republic of China which resulted in a ban for their track and field team, and in 1980, when they participated in the U.S.-led boycott of the 1980 Summer Olympics. The National Olympic Committee for Indonesia was created in 1946 and recognized in 1952. The country has never participated in the Winter Olympic Games, which can be explained by the lack of sporting facilities for winter sports on its territory.

As of 2024, Indonesian athletes have won a total of 40 medals, 22 in badminton, 16 in weightlifting, and 1 each in archery and sport climbing. Among countries in Southeast Asia, Indonesia ranks second behind Thailand in terms of both the number of gold medals (10) and the overall medals (40). Archers Lilies Handayani, Nurfitriyana Saiman and Kusuma Wardhani gained Indonesia's first-ever podium finish (a silver medal) in the women's team event at the 1988 Seoul Olympics. Future married couple Susi Susanti and Alan Budikusuma won the country's first two gold medals in the badminton women's and men's singles events, respectively, at the 1992 Barcelona Olympics. Barcelona 1992 was also the first Games in which Indonesia won multiple gold medals. Since then, Indonesia has won at least one gold medal at every Olympic Games, with the exception of 2012 London Olympics.

In badminton, Indonesia is one of the two countries, along with China, to have won gold medals in all of the sport's five disciplines at the Olympics.

The country's most recent gold medalist is Rizki Juniansyah, who won the 2024 men's 73 kg event in weightlifting, breaking the Clean & Jerk Olympic record in the process. At the age of 21 years, 1 month and 22 days, he became the youngest Indonesian athlete to win an Olympic gold medal, surpassing Susi Susanti who was 21 years, 5 months and 24 days when she won in 1992. His gold medal came just hours after his compatriot Veddriq Leonardo won the speed event of sport climbing. Both men became the first Indonesian athletes to win an Olympic gold medal outside of badminton. With two gold medals, the 2024 Paris Olympics is Indonesia's best Olympic performance since 1992.

== Medal tables ==
=== Medals by Summer Games ===
Games	Athletes	Gold	Silver	Bronze	Total	Rank
1952 Helsinki	3	0	0	0	0	–
1956 Melbourne	30	0	0	0	0	–
1960 Rome	22	0	0	0	0	–
1964 Tokyo	boycotted					
1968 Mexico City	6	0	0	0	0	–
1972 Munich	6	0	0	0	0	–
1976 Montreal	7	0	0	0	0	–
1980 Moscow	boycotted					
1984 Los Angeles	16	0	0	0	0	–
1988 Seoul	29	0	1	0	1	36
1992 Barcelona	42	2	2	1	5	24
1996 Atlanta	40	1	1	2	4	41
2000 Sydney	47	1	3	2	6	38
2004 Athens	38	1	1	2	4	48
2008 Beijing	24	1	1	4	6	40
2012 London	22	0	2	1	3	60
2016 Rio de Janeiro	28	1	2	0	3	46
2020 Tokyo	28	1	1	3	5	55
2024 Paris	29	2	0	1	3	39
2028 Los Angeles	future event					
2032 Brisbane	future event					
Total	417	10	14	16	40	56

=== Medals by sport ===
Sport	Gold	Silver	Bronze	Total
Badminton	8	6	8	22
Weightlifting	1	7	8	16
Sport climbing	1	0	0	1
Archery	0	1	0	1
Totals (4 entries)	10	14	16	40

== List of medalists ==
Medal	Name	Games	Sport	Event
Silver	Lilies Handayani; Nurfitriyana Saiman; Kusuma Wardhani	1988 Seoul	Archery	Women's team
Gold	Susi Susanti	1992 Barcelona	Badminton	Women's singles
Gold	Alan Budikusuma	1992 Barcelona	Badminton	Men's singles
Silver	Ardy Wiranata	1992 Barcelona	Badminton	Men's singles
Silver	Eddy Hartono; Rudy Gunawan	1992 Barcelona	Badminton	Men's doubles
Bronze	Hermawan Susanto	1992 Barcelona	Badminton	Men's singles
Gold	Rexy Mainaky; Ricky Subagja	1996 Atlanta	Badminton	Men's doubles
Silver	Mia Audina	1996 Atlanta	Badminton	Women's singles
Bronze	Susi Susanti	1996 Atlanta	Badminton	Women's singles
Bronze	Antonius Ariantho; Denny Kantono	1996 Atlanta	Badminton	Men's doubles
Gold	Tony Gunawan; Candra Wijaya	2000 Sydney	Badminton	Men's doubles
Silver	Raema Lisa Rumbewas	2000 Sydney	Weightlifting	Women's 48 kg
Silver	Tri Kusharjanto; Minarti Timur	2000 Sydney	Badminton	Mixed doubles
Silver	Hendrawan	2000 Sydney	Badminton	Men's singles
Bronze	Sri Indriyani	2000 Sydney	Weightlifting	Women's 48 kg
Bronze	Winarni Binti Slamet	2000 Sydney	Weightlifting	Women's 53 kg
Gold	Taufik Hidayat	2004 Athens	Badminton	Men's singles
Silver	Raema Lisa Rumbewas	2004 Athens	Weightlifting	Women's 53 kg
Bronze	Eng Hian; Flandy Limpele	2004 Athens	Badminton	Men's doubles
Bronze	Sony Dwi Kuncoro	2004 Athens	Badminton	Men's singles
Gold	Hendra Setiawan; Markis Kido	2008 Beijing	Badminton	Men's doubles
Silver	Nova Widianto; Liliyana Natsir	2008 Beijing	Badminton	Mixed doubles
Bronze	Raema Lisa Rumbewas	2008 Beijing	Weightlifting	Women's 53 kg
Bronze	Eko Yuli Irawan	2008 Beijing	Weightlifting	Men's 56 kg
Bronze	Triyatno	2008 Beijing	Weightlifting	Men's 62 kg
Bronze	Maria Kristin Yulianti	2008 Beijing	Badminton	Women's singles
Silver	Citra Febrianti	2012 London	Weightlifting	Women's 53 kg
Silver	Triyatno	2012 London	Weightlifting	Men's 69 kg
Bronze	Eko Yuli Irawan	2012 London	Weightlifting	Men's 62 kg
Gold	Tontowi Ahmad; Liliyana Natsir	2016 Rio de Janeiro	Badminton	Mixed doubles
Silver	Sri Wahyuni Agustiani	2016 Rio de Janeiro	Weightlifting	Women's 48 kg
Silver	Eko Yuli Irawan	2016 Rio de Janeiro	Weightlifting	Men's 62 kg
Gold	Greysia Polii; Apriyani Rahayu	2020 Tokyo	Badminton	Women's doubles
Silver	Eko Yuli Irawan	2020 Tokyo	Weightlifting	Men's 61 kg
Bronze	Windy Cantika Aisah	2020 Tokyo	Weightlifting	Women's 49 kg
Bronze	Rahmat Erwin Abdullah	2020 Tokyo	Weightlifting	Men's 73 kg
Bronze	Anthony Sinisuka Ginting	2020 Tokyo	Badminton	Men's singles
Gold	Veddriq Leonardo	2024 Paris	Sport climbing	Men's speed
Gold	Rizki Juniansyah	2024 Paris	Weightlifting	Men's 73 kg
Bronze	Gregoria Mariska Tunjung	2024 Paris	Badminton	Women's singles

=== Medals by individual ===
According to official data of the International Olympic Committee, this is a list of people who have won two or more Olympic medals for Indonesia.

Medals by gender
**Gender**	1st place, gold medalist(s)	2nd place, silver medalist(s)	3rd place, bronze medalist(s)	**Total**	**Percentage**
Male	7	6	9	22	55.00%
Female	2	6	7	15	37.50%
Mixed	1	2	0	3	7.50%
Total	10	14	16	40	100%

Athlete	Sport	Years	Games	Gender	1st place, gold medalist(s)	2nd place, silver medalist(s)	3rd place, bronze medalist(s)	Total
Liliyana Natsir	Badminton	2008–2016	Summer	Women	1	1	0	2
Susi Susanti	Badminton	1992–1996	Summer	Women	1	0	1	2
**Eko Yuli Irawan**	Weightlifting	2008–2024	Summer	Men	0	2	2	4
Raema Lisa Rumbewas	Weightlifting	2000–2008	Summer	Women	0	2	1	3
Triyatno	Weightlifting	2008–2016	Summer	Men	0	1	1	2

- **People in bold** are still active competitors

== Olympic participants ==
=== Summer Olympics ===
Sport	(Finland) 1952	(Australia) 1956	(Italy) 1960	(Mexico) 1968	(West Germany) 1972	(Canada) 1976	(United States) 1984	(South Korea) 1988	(Spain) 1992	(United States) 1996	(Australia) 2000	(Greece) 2004	(China) 2008	(United Kingdom) 2012	(Brazil) 2016	(Japan) 2020	(France) 2024	Athletes	Years
Archery	Not held				1	2	2	4	4	3	1	2	2	1	4	4	4	34	13
Athletics	1	3	1		1	1	5	5		1	5	2	2	2	2	2	1	34	15
Badminton	Not held								13	20	19	14	11	9	10	11	9	116	9
Beach volleyball	Not held									4								4	1
Boxing			3		2	2	3	2	2	4	2	1						21	9
Canoeing									3			1						4	2
Cycling			4						2			1			1		1	9	5
Diving					1						3							4	2
Fencing		1	4					2	2					1				10	5
Football		21																21	1
Gymnastics																	1	1	1
Judo	Not held								4	1	2	1		1			1	10	6
Rowing												1			2	2	1	6	4
Sailing			5	3				2		1	1	1	1					14	7
Shooting		1	1				2	1				1	1	1		1	1	10	9
Sport climbing	Not held																4	4	1
Surfing	Not held															1	1	2	2
Swimming	1	3	2			1	1	2		1	6	3	2	1	2	2	2	29	14
Table tennis	Not held							1	3	2	2							8	4
Taekwondo	Not held										1	2						3	2
Tennis	Not held							3	5	2	2	2						14	5
Weightlifting	1	1	2	3	1	1	3	5	4	1	3	6	5	6	7	5	3	57	17
Wrestling								2										2	1
Total Athletes	3	30	22	6	6	7	16	29	42	40	47	38	24	22	28	28	29	417	—
Total Sports	3	6	8	2	5	5	6	11	10	11	12	14	7	8	7	8	12	—	—
Total Events	3	11	19	5	6	11	16	30	31	23	32	27	17	16	20	23	24	—	—
Sport	(Finland) 1952	(Australia) 1956	(Italy) 1960	(Mexico) 1968	(Germany) 1972	(Canada) 1976	(United States) 1984	(South Korea) 1988	(Spain) 1992	(United States) 1996	(Australia) 2000	(Greece) 2004	(China) 2008	(United Kingdom) 2012	(Brazil) 2016	(Japan) 2020	(France) 2024	Athletes	Years

== See also ==
- Olympic Games
- Paralympic Games
- Indonesia at the Paralympics
- Indonesia at the Deaflympics
- Indonesia at the Youth Olympics
- Indonesia at the World Games
- Indonesia at the Asian Games
- Indonesia at the Asian Para Games
- Indonesia at the Asian Youth Games
- Indonesia at the SEA Games
- Indonesia at the ASEAN Para Games
- Indonesia at the Islamic Solidarity Games
- Indonesia at the FIFA World Cup
- Indonesia at the AFC Asian Cup
- GANEFO
- ASEAN University Games
- ASEAN School Games
- Sports in Indonesia
- Category:Olympic competitors for Indonesia
- Category:Paralympic competitors for Indonesia
