= Indonesia at the SEA Games =

Indonesia at the Southeast Asian Games
- IOC code: INA
- NOC: Indonesian Olympic Committee
- Medals Ranked 2nd: Gold 2,072 Silver 1,987 Bronze 2,101 Total 6,160

Southeast Asian Games appearances (overview)
- 1977; 1979; 1981; 1983; 1985; 1987; 1989; 1991; 1993; 1995; 1997; 1999; 2001; 2003; 2005; 2007; 2009; 2011; 2013; 2015; 2017; 2019; 2021; 2023; 2025; 2027; 2029

Indonesia competed for the first time in the Southeast Asian Games in 1977 in Kuala Lumpur, Malaysia. Indonesia ranks 2nd on the current All-time Medal Tally behind the powerhouse Thailand. Indonesia has dominated the medal tally ranks, excluding all of the games that Indonesia has hosted, they have ranked 1st in 1977, 1981, 1983, 1989, 1991, and 1993.

Indonesia has hosted the games 4 times, first in 1979, again in 1987, 10 years later in 1997, and their final hosted event in 2011.

== History ==
Indonesia has hosted the games 4 times. They first competed in 1977 debuting with the Philippines and Brunei. Indonesia bid and hosted the 1979 Southeast Asian Games in Jakarta, Indonesia. They hosted again after 9 years in 1987, they hosted again after 10 years in 1997, and hosted their recent games in 2011 after 14 years in Jakarta and Palembang. Indonesia then hosted the 2018 Asian Games after 7 years of hosting the Southeast Asian Games. Indonesia hosted the Asian Games once before in 1962 in Jakarta.

== Medal tally ==
*Red border color indicates tournament was held on home soil.

All-time Medal tally
Games	Athletes	1st place, gold medalist(s)	2nd place, silver medalist(s)	3rd place, bronze medalist(s)	Total	Rank
(Malaysia) 1977 Kuala Lumpur	268	62	41	34	137	1st
(Indonesia) 1979 Jakarta		92	78	52	222	1st
(Philippines) 1981 Manila		85	73	56	214	1st
1983 Singapore		64	67	54	185	1st
(Thailand) 1985 Bangkok		62	73	76	211	2nd
(Indonesia) 1987 Jakarta		183	136	84	403	1st
(Malaysia) 1989 Kuala Lumpur		102	78	71	251	1st
(Philippines) 1991 Manila		92	86	67	245	1st
1993 Singapore		88	81	84	253	1st
(Thailand) 1995 Chiang Mai		77	67	77	221	2nd
(Indonesia) 1997 Jakarta	916	194	101	115	410	1st
(Brunei) 1999 Bandar Seri Begawan	354	44	43	58	145	3rd
(Malaysia) 2001 Kuala Lumpur	593	72	74	80	226	3rd
(Vietnam) 2003 Hanoi–Ho Chi Minh City		55	68	98	221	3rd
(Philippines) 2005 Manila	779	50	78	89	217	5th
(Thailand) 2007 Nakhon Ratchasima	574	56	64	82	202	4th
(Laos) 2009 Vientiane	650	43	53	74	170	3rd
(Indonesia) 2011 Jakarta–Palembang	1,053	182	151	143	476	1st
(Myanmar) 2013 Naypyidaw	665	65	84	111	260	4th
2015 Singapore	529	47	61	74	182	5th
(Malaysia) 2017 Kuala Lumpur	535	38	63	90	191	5th
2019 Philippines	837	72	84	111	267	4th
(Vietnam) 2021 Hanoi	499	69	91	81	241	3rd
(Cambodia) 2023 Phnom Penh	599	87	80	109	276	3rd
(Thailand) 2025 Bangkok–Chonburi	1,021	91	112	131	334	2nd
2027 Malaysia						
Total		2072	1987	2101	6160	2nd

== See also ==
- Olympic Games
- Paralympic Games
- Indonesia at the Olympics
- Indonesia at the Paralympics
- Indonesia at the Deaflympics
- Indonesia at the Youth Olympics
- Indonesia at the World Games
- Indonesia at the Asian Games
- Indonesia at the Asian Para Games
- Indonesia at the Asian Youth Games
- Indonesia at the ASEAN Para Games
- Indonesia at the Islamic Solidarity Games
- GANEFO
- ASEAN University Games
- ASEAN School Games
- Sports in Indonesia
