= Indonesia at the Asian Para Games =

- IPC code: INA
- NPC: National Paralympic Committee of Indonesia
- Website: www.npcindonesia.org (in Indonesian)
- Medals Ranked 7th: Gold 91 Silver 114 Bronze 148 Total 353

Asian Para Games appearances (overview)
- 2010; 2014; 2018; 2022; 2026

Indonesia has participated in the Asian Para Games since the first edition in Guangzhou, China, in 2010.

The Asian Para Games superseded the FESPIC Games, which was dissolved alongside the FESPIC Federation, the governing body of the games and merged with the Asian Paralympic Council which was renamed as the Asian Paralympic Committee at the closing of the final FESPIC edition held in November 2006 in Kuala Lumpur, Malaysia. The first Asian multi-sports event for athletes with a disability, the inaugural Asian Para Games was held in 2010 in Guangzhou, China.

With 279 medals, Indonesia is currently on 7th rank in all times Asian Para Games medal table. Highest achievement of Indonesia was in 2018 Asian Para Games at Jakarta with 37 golds and 135 total medals.

== Hosted Games ==
As is the tradition of the event, since 2010, the Asian Para Games are usually held after every Asian Games in the same host country. On 29 February 2016, Indonesia signed the 2018 Asian Para Games host city contract at a ceremony in Jakarta, having confirmed as host city of the event on 21 October 2014 in Incheon, South Korea. A local organising committee named the Indonesia Asian Para Games Organizing Committee (INAPGOC) led by Raja Sapta Oktohari was formed soon after it was appointed host country of the 2018 Asian Para Games for all preparations, opening, organising, and finalizing the implementation of the event.

The opening ceremony of the 2018 Asian Para Games took place on Saturday, 6 October 2018, at the Gelora Bung Karno Main Stadium in Jakarta, Indonesia. The event commenced at 19:00 Indonesia Western Time (UTC+7) and ended at 21:43 local time. Jay Subiyakto was the Associate creative director of the ceremony.

== Asian Para Games ==
=== Medals by games ===
Games	Rank	Gold	Silver	Bronze	Total
(China) 2010 Guangzhou	14	1	5	5	11
(South Korea) 2014 Incheon	9	9	11	18	38
(Indonesia) 2018 Jakarta	5	37	47	51	135
(China) 2022 Hangzhou	5	29	30	37	96
(Japan) 2026 Aichi–Nagoya	8	15	21	37	73
Total	7	91	114	148	353

=== Medals by sport ===
Sport	Rank	Gold	Silver	Bronze	Total
Archery	10	0	0	2	2
Athletics	9	11	21	24	56
Badminton	2	16	17	13	46
Boccia	6	1	1	1	3
Bowling	6	1	1	0	2
Chess	1	21	12	14	47
Cycling	5	4	12	12	28
Fencing	9	0	0	1	1
Judo	8	1	0	2	3
Lawn bowls	4	6	7	11	24
Powerlifting	15	0	7	6	13
Swimming	8	9	10	7	26
Table tennis	4	6	5	17	28
Total	7	76	93	110	279

== Asian Youth Para Games ==
=== Medals by games ===
Games	Rank	Gold	Silver	Bronze	Total
(Japan) 2009 Tokyo	did not participate				
(Malaysia) 2013 Kuala Lumpur	11	8	5	5	18
(United Arab Emirates) 2017 Dubai	7	16	7	5	28
(Bahrain) 2021 Manama	5	12	11	14	37
(United Arab Emirates) 2025 Dubai	6	31	34	24	89
Total	7	67	57	48	172

== See also ==
- Indonesia at the Olympics
- Indonesia at the Paralympics
- Indonesia at the Deaflympics
- Indonesia at the Youth Olympics
- Indonesia at the World Games
- Indonesia at the Asian Games
- Indonesia at the SEA Games
- Indonesia at the ASEAN Para Games
- Indonesia at the Islamic Solidarity Games
- Indonesia at the FIFA World Cup
- Indonesia at the AFC Asian Cup
- GANEFO
- ASEAN University Games
- ASEAN School Games
- Sports in Indonesia
