= List of 1997 World Games medal winners =

The 1997 World Games were held in Lahti, Finland, from August 7 to August 17, 1997.

== Acrobatic gymnastics ==
Event	Gold	Silver	Bronze
Men's pair	China; Song Min; Li Renjie	United Kingdom; Martyn Smith; Mark Flores	Poland; Dariusz Nowak; Marcin Drabicki
Men's group	Russia; Denys Pirogov; Maksim Vlasov; Aleksandr Maikrov; Oleg Ivanov	Ukraine; Andrey Safonov; Yuriy Zaveryukha; Sergiy Pavlov; Dmitriy Bain	China; Wu Weihuan; Huang Linseng; Chen Wuhua; Jiang Jianfen
Women's pair	Russia; Anna Mokhova; Yuliya Lopatkina	Belarus; Yekaterina Raktcheyeva; Oksana Feoktistova	Belgium; Kaat Croubels; Tine Dewaele
Women's group	Russia; Yelvira Zaliayeva; Svetlana Kushu; Yelena Avakeliyan	Ukraine; Yelena Moyseychea; Nadezhda Surina; Viktoriya Zherdeva	China; Xu Yingxia; Luo Xiajing; Wang Ting
Mixed pair	Russia; Sofiya Galiyulina; Dmitriy Kukva	China; Lü Xiaojun; Lu Yijie	Poland; Ewelina Fijolek; Andrzej Sokołowski

== Aerobic gymnastics ==
Event	Gold	Silver	Bronze
Men's individual	(Bulgaria) Kalojan Kalojanov	(Russia) Stanislav Marchenkov	(Netherlands) Patrick Nahafahik
Women's individual	(Australia) Juanita Little	(Russia) Olga Rumyantseva	(Slovakia) Barbara Vadovicová
Mixed pair	Russia; Tatyana Solovyova; Vladislav Oksner	Bulgaria; Konstantza Popova; Kalojan Kalojanov	United Kingdom; Helen Carpenter-Waters; Alastair Rates
Trio	Hungary; Attila Katus; Tamas Katus; Romeo Szentgyörgyi	Russia; Denys Belikov; Stanislav Marchenkov; Vadim Michaylov	France; Grégory Alcan; Xavier Julien; Olivier Salvan

== Archery ==
Event	Gold	Silver	Bronze
Men's recurve	(Germany) Sven Giesa	(Italy) Andrea Parenti	(Italy) Fulvio Verdecchia
Men's compound	(Sweden) Morgan Lundin	(Denmark) Niels Baldur	(Germany) Peter Penner
Men's barebow	(Sweden) Mathias Larsson	(Netherlands) Rensco van Wees	(Italy) Alessandro Gaudethi
Women's recurve	(Sweden) Ingrid Kihlander	(Sweden) Liselotte Andersson	(Germany) Hedi Mittermaier
Women's compound	(Sweden) Petra Ericsson	(Denmark) Mari Henriksen	(Slovenia) Jožica Emeršič
Women's barebow	(Germany) Jutta Schneider	(United Kingdom) Patricia Lovell	(Italy) Cristina Pugnaghi

== Artistic roller skating ==
Event	Gold	Silver	Bronze
Men's free skating	(United States) Eric Anderson	(Spain) Clemente Cerezo	(United Kingdom) Lee Taylor
Women's free skating	(Australia) Tammy Bryant	(United States) Jennifer Orcutt	(France) Laure Bourguignon
Pairs	United States	United States	Germany
Dance	Germany	United States	United States

== Bodybuilding ==
Event	Gold	Silver	Bronze
Men's 65 kg	(Egypt) Anwar el-Amawy	(Egypt) Mohamed Abdel el-Aziz	(Brazil) José Carlos Santos
Men's 70 kg	(Japan) Toshiko Hirota	(United States) Chris Faildo	none awarded
Men's 75 kg	(South Korea) Kim Jun-Ho	(Finland) Juha Hakala	(Egypt) Ahmed al-Sayed
Men's 80 kg	(Germany) Kester Pasche	(United States) Johnny Steward	(Finland) Yrjö Jokela
Men's 90 kg	(United States) Milton Holloway	(Germany) Ingo Fischer	(Hungary) Janos Lantos
Men's +90 kg	(Austria) Walter Lettner	(Finland) Peter Keränen	(Lithuania) Olegas Zuras
Women's 52 kg	(Japan) Utako Mizuma	(Finland) Katja Rydström	(Germany) Heike Jung
Women's 57 kg	(Switzerland) Barbara Furer	(Liechtenstein) Rita Rinner	none awarded
Women's +57 kg	(Germany) Michaela Baumer	(Finland) Pauliina Kosola	(Finland) Anne Oksanen

== Boules sports ==
Event	Gold	Silver	Bronze
Men's pétanque triples	Spain; Enrique Catalan; Jose Hoyo Quilez; Isidro Pomares Solsona	Italy; Stefano Bruno; Gianni Laugueglia; Massimiliano Tiboni	France; Michel Briand; Michel Loy; Zvonko Radic
Women's pétanque precision shooting doubles	Belgium; Fabienne Berodyes; Linda Goblet	France; Angelique Colombet; Christine Saunier	Spain; Catlina Gomez Mayo; Rosario Ines Lizon

== Bowling ==
Event	Gold	Silver	Bronze
Men's singles	(Belgium) Gery Verbruggen	(United States) Vernon Peterson	(Philippines) Rafael Nepomuceno
Women's singles	(Germany) Patricia Schwarz	(France) Isabelle Saldjian	(South Korea) Lee Mi-Young
Mixed doubles	Malaysia; Sharon Low; Daniel Lim	Australia; Cara Honeychurch; Andrew Frawley	Japan; Tomomi Shibata; Shigeo Saito

== Casting ==
Event	Gold	Silver	Bronze
Men's fly accuracy	(Germany) Thomas Maire	(Austria) Werner Gattermaier	(Norway) Frode Semb
Men's fly distance single handed	(Canada) Slaveyko Slaveykov	(Slovakia) Robert Meszaros	(Czech Republic) Patrik Lexa
Men's spinning accuracy Arenberg target	(Czech Republic) Patrik Lexa	(Sweden) Henrik Harjanne	(Czech Republic) Josef Luxa
Men's spinning accuracy	(Czech Republic) Patrik Lexa	(Germany) Thomas Maire	(Slovakia) Jan Meszaros
Men's spinning distance single handed	(Slovakia) Jan Meszaros	(Germany) Thomas Maire	(Czech Republic) Patrik Lexa
Men's multiplier accuracy	(United States) Steve Rajeff	(Canada) Harvey Beck	(Sweden) Henrik Österberg
Women's fly accuracy	(Czech Republic) Hana Tupa	(Czech Republic) Michaela Krizová	(Germany) Kathrin Ernst
Women's fly distance single handed	(Czech Republic) Michaela Krizová	(Czech Republic) Hana Tupa	(Poland) Ewa Borowska
Women's spinning accuracy Arenberg target	(Sweden) Annika Janson	(Czech Republic) Michaela Krizová	(Finland) Marianne Kosonen
Women's spinning accuracy	(Germany) Kathrin Ernst	(Czech Republic) Michaela Krizová	(Canada) Brenda Banks
Women's multiplier accuracy	(Canada) Bernda Banks	(Finland) Marianne Kosonen	(Sweden) Annika Janson

== Dancesport ==
Event	Gold	Silver	Bronze
Standard	Great Britain; Hazel Newberry; Christopher Hawkins	Italy; Alessandra Bucciarelli; William Pino	Germany; Pia David; Stefan Ossenkop
Latin	Denmark; Mie Bach; Steen Lund	Slovenia; Katerina Venturini; Andrej Skufca	Finland; Katja Koukkula; Jussi Väänänen

== Fistball ==
Event	Gold	Silver	Bronze
Men	Germany	Austria	Brazil

== Korfball ==
Event	Gold	Silver	Bronze
Mixed	Netherlands	Belgium	Chinese Taipei

== Parachuting ==
Event	Gold	Silver	Bronze
Men's skydiving accuracy landing	(Czech Republic) Ivan Hovorka	(China) Junbo Chen	(Belarus) Oleg Fomin
Men's skydiving freestyle landing	(Saudi Arabia) Omar Alhegelan	(United States) Scott Smith	(France) Nicolas Arnaud
Women's skydiving accuracy landing	(Slovenia) Irena Avbelj	(China) Xiaoli Lai	(Poland) Monika Filipowska
Women's skydiving freestyle landing	(United States) Dale Stuart	(Japan) Chifumi Sakakibara	(Switzerland) Lucrezia Manni-Hunold
Skydiving - formation skydiving	United States; Daniel Brodsky-Chenfeld; Jack Jefferies; Mark Kirkby; Kirk Verner	France; Thierry Boitieux; Marin Ferre; Martial Ferre; Davide Moy	South Africa; Gary Smith; Robert Spencer; Fred Whitsitt; Solly Williams

== Powerlifting ==
Event	Gold	Silver	Bronze
Men's lightweight	Alexey Sivokon (KAZ)	Sutrisno Bin Darimin (INA)	Hu Chun-hsiung (TPE)
Men's middleweight	Triharyanto (INA)	Dmitriy Soloviov (UKR)	Jan Wilczyński (POL)
Men's heavyweight	Sturla Davidsen (NOR)	Carl Christoffersen (NOR)	Janne Toivanen (FIN)
Women's lightweight	Lin Li-min (TPE)	Raija Koskinen (FIN)	Nadezhda Mir (KAZ)
Women's middleweight	Carrie Boudreau (USA)	Ingeborg Marx (BEL)	Irene Frangi (ARG)
Women's heavyweight	Lisa Sjöstrand (SWE)	Lee Chia-sui (TPE)	Chao Chen-yeh (TPE)

== Squash ==
Event	Gold	Silver	Bronze
Men's singles	(Egypt) Ahmed Barada	(Republic of Ireland) Derek Ryan	(Canada) Graham Ryding
Women's singles	(Australia) Sarah Fitz-Gerald	(Germany) Sabine Schöne	(New Zealand) Leilani Joyce

== Trampoline gymnastics ==
Event	Gold	Silver	Bronze
Men's individual	(Belarus) Nikolay Kazak	(France) Emmanuel Durand	(Russia) Aleksandr Danilchenko
Men's synchro	Belarus; Mikalai Kazak; Vladimir Kakorko	Germany; Michael Serth; Martin Kubicka	Australia; Adrian Wareham; Ji Wallace
Men's tumbling	(Russia) Vladimir Ignatenkov	(United States) Rayshine Harris	(South Africa) Tseko Mogotsi
Women's individual	(Uzbekistan) Yelena Savaleva	(Ukraine) Olena Movchan	(Georgia (country)) Anna Dogonadze-Lilkendey
Women's synchro	Ukraine; Oxana Tsyhuleva; Olena Movchan	Uzbekistan; Yelena Savaleva; Yekaterina Khilko	Belarus; Galina Lebedeva; Natalya Karpenkova
Women's tumbling	(Ukraine) Olena Chabanenko	(France) Chrystel Robert	(Russia) Natalya Borisenko

== Tug of war ==
Event	Gold	Silver	Bronze
Men's 640 kg	Spain	Switzerland	Ireland
Men's 720 kg	Netherlands	Sweden	Ireland

== Water skiing ==
List of results

== Weightlifting ==
Event	Gold	Silver	Bronze
Women's 46 kg	(Spain) Estefanía Juan	(United States) Lorean Briner	none awarded
Women's 50 kg	(China) Shao Yongxia	none awarded	
Women's 54 kg	(Canada) Maryse Turcotte	(Chinese Taipei) Chu Nan-mei	(Sweden) Maria Bohm
Women's 59 kg	(Chinese Taipei) Wu Mei-yi	(Spain) Josefa Pérez	(Sweden) Christina Mard
Women's 64 kg	(China) Shi Lihua	(Chinese Taipei) Chen Jui-lien	(South Korea) Chei Eun-ja
Women's 70 kg	(China) Yu Wenyu	(Greece) Ioanna Chatziioannou	(Finland) Outi Päiväniemi
Women's 76 kg	(Chinese Taipei) Kuo Su-fen	(South Korea) Kim Dong-hee	(Spain) Mónica Carrió
Women's 83 kg	(Colombia) María Isabel Urrutia	(Ukraine) Elena Tkachuk	none awarded
Women's +83 kg	(Chinese Taipei) Chen Hsiao-lien	(Colombia) Carmenza Delgado	(Finland) Katarina Sederholm
