= Powerlifting at the 1997 World Games – Men's lightweight =

Powerlifting men's lightweight at the 1997 World Games
- Venue: Lahti, Finland
- Date: 8 August 1997
- Competitors: 7 from 7 nations

Medalists
gold medal	(Kazakhstan) Alexey Sivokon
silver medal	(Indonesia) Sutrisno Bin Darimin
bronze medal	(Chinese Taipei) Hu Chun-hsiung

The men's lightweight competition in powerlifting at the 1997 World Games took place on 8 August 1997 in Lahti, Finland.

== Competition format ==
A total of 7 athletes entered the competition. Each athlete had 3 attempts in each of 3 events: squat, bench press and deadlift. Athlete, who came with the biggest score in Wilks points is the winner.

== Results ==
Rank	Athlete	Nation	Weight	Squat	Bench press	Deadlift	Total weight	Total points
1st place, gold medalist(s)	Alexey Sivokon	Kazakhstan	66.0	300.0	200.5	295.0	795.5	624.23
2nd place, silver medalist(s)	Sutrisno Bin Darimin	Indonesia	60.1	285.0	157.5	280.0	722.5	615.27
3rd place, bronze medalist(s)	Hu Chun-hsiung	Chinese Taipei	55.4	260.0	107.5	265.0	632.5	581.92
4	Andrzej Stanaszek	Poland	51.1	277.5	172.5	130.0	580.0	579.73
5	Roy Brandtzæg	Norway	56.4	237.5	122.5	215.0	575.0	519.83
6	Jonathan Arenberg	United States	59.0	192.5	135.0	210.0	537.5	465.57
	Janne Ollila	Finland	67.3	260.0	NM	-	DSQ	DSQ
