= Shourya Ambure =

Indian athlete (born 2009)

Personal information
- Full name: Shourya Avinash Ambure
- Born: 3 September 2009 (age 17) Thane, Maharashtra, India

Sport
- Sport: Athletics
- Event: 100 m hurdles
Medal record
Women's athletics
Representing India
Youth Olympic Games
Bronze medal – third place	2026 Dakar	100 m hurdles
Asian Youth Games
Silver medal – second place	2025 Bahrain	100 m hurdles
Silver medal – second place	2025 Bahrain	Medley relay
Asian U18 Championships
Bronze medal – third place	2025 Dammam	100 m hurdles

Shourya Avinash Ambure (born 3 September 2009) is an Indian athlete who specialises in the 100 m hurdles. She is the first Indian woman to win a Youth Olympics medal in athletics, claiming bronze in the 100 m hurdles at the 2026 edition.

== Early life ==
Shourya was born on 3 September 2009 in Thane in Maharashtra, India. Both her parents, Avinash and Rupali Ambure, are IPS officers holding high ranks in Maharashtra Police. She studied at The Universal School, Thane.

== International competitions ==
Representing India
Year	Competition	Host	Position	Event	Result
2025	Asian U18 Championships	Dammam, Saudi Arabia	3rd	100 m hurdles	13.80
2025	Asian Youth Games	Riffa, Bahrain	2nd	100 m hurdles	13.73
2025	Asian Youth Games	Riffa, Bahrain	2nd	Medley relay	2:09.65
2026	Youth Olympic Games	Dakar, Senegal	3rd	100 m hurdles	13.59
