= Indonesia at the Youth Olympics =

- IOC code: INA
- NOC: Indonesian Olympic Committee
- Website: www.nocindonesia.or.id (in Indonesian)
- Medals Ranked 102nd: Gold 0 Silver 1 Bronze 5 Total 6

Summer appearances
- 2010; 2014; 2018; 2026

Indonesia first participated at the Youth Olympic Games at the inaugural 2010 Games. Indonesia has never participated in the Winter Youth Olympic Games.

== Medal tables ==
=== Medals by Summer Games ===
Games	Athletes	Gold	Silver	Bronze	Total	Rank
2010 Singapore	14	0	0	1	1	84
(China) 2014 Nanjing	27	0	0	1	1	80
(Argentina) 2018 Buenos Aires	16	0	0	1	1	83
(Senegal) 2026 Dakar	12	0	1	2	3	67
Total		0	1	5	6	108

=== Medals by Summer sport ===
Sport	Gold	Silver	Bronze	Total
Wushu	0	1	0	1
Weightlifting	0	0	2	2
Badminton	0	0	1	1
Judo	0	0	1	1
Swimming	0	0	1	1
Totals (5 entries)	0	1	5	6

== List of medalists ==
=== Summer Games ===
Medal	Name	Games	Sport	Event
Bronze	Dewi Safitri	2010 Singapore	Weightlifting	Girls' 53 kg
Bronze	Anthony Sinisuka Ginting	(China) 2014 Nanjing	Badminton	Boys' singles
Bronze	Nur Vinatasari	(Argentina) 2018 Buenos Aires	Weightlifting	Girls' 53 kg
Silver	Asael Rondonuwu	(Senegal) 2026 Dakar	Wushu	Men's changquan combined
Bronze	Sashenka Fatimah	(Senegal) 2026 Dakar	Judo	Women's 63 kg
Bronze	Michelle Surjadi Fang	(Senegal) 2026 Dakar	Swimming	Women's 200 m butterfly

== Competitors ==
Summer Games

Sport	2010	2014	2018	2026	Total
Archery	1	2	—	—	3
Athletics	—	1	2	1	4
Badminton	2	2	2	2	8
Basketball	—	8	4	—	12
Cycling	4	—	—	2	6
Golf	—	—	1	—	1
Equestrian	—	—	—	1	1
Judo	—	—	—	1	1
Rowing	—	1	—	—	1
Sailing	—	2	—	—	2
Shooting	—	1	1	—	2
Skateboarding	—N/a			1	1
Swimming	3	4	4	2	13
Taekwondo	1	—	—	—	1
Tennis	1	—	—	—	1
Triathlon	—	—	—	1	1
Volleyball	—	4	2	—	6
Weightlifting	2	2	1	—	5
Wushu	—N/a			1	1
Total	14	27	17	12	70

== Flag bearers ==
Games	Season	Flag bearer	Sport
2010 Singapore	Summer	Destian Satria	Cycling
2014 Nanjing	Summer	Rendy Licardo	Beach volleyball
2018 Buenos Aires	Summer	Ni Putu Eka Febiananda	Basketball
2026 Dakar	Summer	Michelle Surjadi Fang	Swimming
2026 Dakar	Summer	Nusrtdinov Zayan Fatih	Equestrian

== See also ==
- Indonesia at the Olympics
- Indonesia at the Paralympics
- Indonesia at the Deaflympics
- Indonesia at the Asian Games
- Indonesia at the Asian Para Games
- Indonesia at the SEA Games
- Indonesia at the ASEAN Para Games
- Indonesia at the Islamic Solidarity Games
- GANEFO
- Sports in Indonesia
