= Athletics at the 2026 Summer Youth Olympics – Women's 100 metres hurdles =

Athletics event at the 2026 Summer Youth Olympics

Women's 100 metres hurdles at the IV Summer Youth Olympic Games
- Venue: Complexe Iba Mar Diop
- Date: 8 November
- Competitors: 16 from 16 nations

Medalists
1st place, gold medalist(s)		Zhang Keyi	China
2nd place, silver medalist(s)		Anna Peeters	France
3rd place, bronze medalist(s)		Shourya Avinash Ambure	India

The women's 100 metres hurdles competition at the 2026 Summer Youth Olympics was held on 8 November at the Complexe Iba Mar Diop in Dakar, Senegal.

== Schedule ==
All times are in local time (UTC).

Date	Time	Round
Sunday, 8 November 2026	14:05	Semi-finals
Sunday, 8 November 2026	16:41	Final
Sunday, 8 November 2026	17:53	Victory ceremony

== Results ==
=== Semi-finals ===
The semi-finals consisted of two semi-finals. The first four athletes in each semi-final (Q) qualified automatically for the final. One additional athlete with the fastest time among the remaining competitors (q) also advanced to the final. A total of nine athletes qualified for the final.

The abbreviation Q denotes qualification by finishing position, while q denotes qualification by time. Athletes who did not meet either qualification criterion were eliminated.

==== Phase Summary ====
Rank	Bib	Lane	Athlete	Nation	Semi-final	Result	Notes
1	131	8	Zhang Keyi	China	SF1	13.45	Q, SB
2	168	4	Anna Peeters	France	SF2	13.62	Q
3	183	7	Shourya Avinash Ambure	India	SF2	13.77	Q, PB
4	111	6	Fiona Schwarz	Austria	SF1	14.12	Q
5	236	5	Sara Ferreira	Portugal	SF2	14.19	Q
6	134	6	Wanda Luciana Arizala	Colombia	SF2	14.20	Q
7	120	3	Gisele Sanou	Burkina Faso	SF2	14.21	q, PB
8	116	5	Melissa Goncalves	Brazil	SF1	14.22	Q
9	244	4	Janelle Kirkpatrick	South Africa	SF1	14.39	Q
10	290	3	Niginabonu Rajabova	Uzbekistan	SF1	15.03	
11	202	7	Kim Seohyun	South Korea	SF1	15.11	
12	267	8	Angelina Tupou	Tonga	SF2	16.33	
13	103	2	Alissar Saadellah	Algeria	SF1	17.45	SB
14	184	2	Fatimah Al-Azzawi	Iraq	SF2	18.75	PB
15	189	9	Taraji George	British Virgin Islands	SF2	20.07	PB
—	229	9	Treasure Omosivwe	Nigeria	SF1	DNS	

=== Final ===
The final was held on 8 November 2026 at 16:41. The race was run with a headwind of 0.1 metres per second.

Rank	Lane	Bib	Athlete	Nation	Result	Reaction time	Remark
1st place, gold medalist(s)	4	131	Zhang Keyi	China	13.17	0.157	PB
2nd place, silver medalist(s)	5	168	Anna Peeters	France	13.57	0.150	
3rd place, bronze medalist(s)	6	183	Shourya Avinash Ambure	India	13.59	0.142	PB
4	7	111	Fiona Schwarz	Austria	13.76	0.150	=PB
5	1	244	Janelle Kirkpatrick	South Africa	13.78	0.172	
6	8	116	Melissa Goncalves	Brazil	14.00	0.142	
7	3	236	Sara Ferreira	Portugal	14.10	0.160	
8	2	134	Wanda Luciana Arizala	Colombia	14.36	0.147	
9	9	120	Gisele Sanou	Burkina Faso	14.57	0.191	
