= Weightlifting at the Summer Youth Olympics =

- Governing body: IWF
- Events: 12 (men: 6; women: 6)

Games
- 2010; 2014; 2018

Weightlifting has featured as a sport at the Youth Olympic Summer Games since its first edition in 2010 in Singapore. The Youth Olympic Games are a multi-sport event and the games are held every four years just like the Olympic Games. Eleven weightlifting events (6 for boys and 5 for girls) were contested at the 2010 and 2014 games; for the 2018 games in Buenos Aires that number raised by 12 (6 for boys and girls).

== Summary ==
Games	Year	Events	Best Nation
1	2010	11	China / Russia
2	2014	11	Thailand
3	2018	12	Turkey

== Medal table ==
As of the 2018 Summer Youth Olympics

Rank	Nation	Gold	Silver	Bronze	Total
1	China	4	2	0	6
2	Thailand	3	6	0	9
3	Russia	3	5	0	8
4	Armenia	3	1	1	5
4	Bulgaria	3	1	1	5
6	North Korea	2	2	1	5
7	Vietnam	2	2	0	4
8	Iran	2	0	0	2
9	Turkey	1	2	2	5
9	Uzbekistan	1	2	2	5
11	Egypt	1	1	3	5
11	Kazakhstan	1	1	3	5
13	Mexico	1	1	2	4
14	Azerbaijan	1	1	0	2
14	Chinese Taipei	1	1	0	2
14	India	1	1	0	2
17	Italy	1	0	1	2
17	Romania	1	0	1	2
17	Tunisia	1	0	1	2
17	Venezuela	1	0	1	2
21	Colombia	0	3	2	5
22	Georgia	0	1	0	1
22	Serbia	0	1	0	1
24	Indonesia	0	0	2	2
24	Ukraine	0	0	2	2
26	Argentina	0	0	1	1
26	Cuba	0	0	1	1
26	Czech Republic	0	0	1	1
26	France	0	0	1	1
26	Latvia	0	0	1	1
26	Netherlands	0	0	1	1
26	Nigeria	0	0	1	1
26	Saudi Arabia	0	0	1	1
26	United States	0	0	1	1
Totals (34 entries)		34	34	34	102

== See also ==
- Weightlifting at the Summer Olympics
- Youth World Weightlifting Championships
