= Powerlifting at the 2001 World Games – Men's lightweight =

Powerlifting men's lightweight at the 2001 World Games
- Venue: Akita City Culture Hall, Akita, Japan
- Date: 21 August 2001
- Competitors: 11 from 6 nations

Medalists
gold medal	(Kazakhstan) Alexey Sivokon
silver medal	(Russia) Konstantin Pavlov
bronze medal	(Russia) Mikhail Andryukhin

The men's lightweight competition in powerlifting at the 2001 World Games took place on 21 August 2001 at the Akita City Culture Hall in Akita, Japan.

== Competition format ==
A total of 11 athletes entered the competition. Each athlete had 3 attempts in each of 3 events: squat, bench press and deadlift. The athlete with the biggest score in Wilks points is the winner.

== Results ==
Rank	Athlete	Nation	Weight	Squat	Bench press	Deadlift	Total weight	Total points
1st place, gold medalist(s)	Alexey Sivokon	Kazakhstan	67.5	305.0	217.5 WR	290.0	812.5	626.438
2nd place, silver medalist(s)	Konstantin Pavlov	Russia	55.8	245.0	172.5	220.0	637.5	582.356
3rd place, bronze medalist(s)	Mikhail Andryukhin	Russia	60.3	270.0	142.5	250.0	662.5	562.463
4	Lu Shih-wu	Chinese Taipei	55.5	247.5	115.0	240.0	602.5	553.336
5	Shin Watanabe	Japan	51.7	200.0	147.5	200.0	547.5	540.547
6	Ervin Gainer	United States	51.5	190.0	127.5	222.5	540.0	535.302
7	Hsieh Tsung-ting	Chinese Taipei	59.0	225.0	152.5	240.0	617.5	534.879
8	Hideaki Inaba	Japan	51.6	220.0	95.0	220.0	535.0	529.276
9	Roy Brandtzæg	Norway	58.1	235.0	130.0	220.0	585.0	514.040
10	Gregory Simmons	United States	67.4	235.0	155.0	247.5	637.5	492.086
11	Justin Maile	United States	67.3	235.0	137.5	237.5	610.0	471.469
