= Athletics at the 2025 Asian Youth Games =

- Venue: Bahrain National Stadium
- Dates: 23–26 October 2025

Athletics at the 2025 Asian Youth Games was held in Riffa, Bahrain from 23 to 26 October 2025 at the Bahrain National Stadium. There were 42 events in the original program, but four cross-country events and the girls' pole vault were cancelled due to a lack of entries.

== Medalists ==
=== Boys ===
Event	Gold		Silver		Bronze	
100 m	Lai Jianguang; China	10.56	Lin Xiaohai; China	10.73	Huang Guan-yao; Chinese Taipei	10.82
200 m	Pi Durden Wangkay; Philippines	21.76	Chu Chao-feng; Chinese Taipei	21.90	Kim Sun-woo; South Korea	21.93
400 m	Yang Jia; China	46.57	Saeed Shoaib Omar; United Arab Emirates	47.18	Shanuka Costa; Sri Lanka	47.72
800 m	Bashar Sharahili; Saudi Arabia	1:57.04	Khalaf Al-Bishi; Saudi Arabia	1:57.73	Al-Yazan Al-Shamsi; Oman	1:58.79
1500 m	Lahiru Achintha; Sri Lanka	3:57.42	Sha Lihua; China	3:58.73	Au Ho Chun; Hong Kong	4:05.09
3000 m	Wang Cheng-yu; Chinese Taipei	8:34.46	Li Zicheng; China	8:55.76	Nurbolsyn Murat; Kazakhstan	9:07.81
110 m hurdles	Aboubakar Idriss; Qatar	13.61	Tao Kaidi; China	14.11	Naif Al-Smairi; Saudi Arabia	14.12
400 m hurdles	Wu Mingwei; China	52.72	Lin Hong-xiang; Chinese Taipei	53.10	Lo Chin-hsiang; Chinese Taipei	53.55
2000 m steeplechase	Xu Chengwei; China	5:52.99	Bùi Tuấn Tú; Vietnam	6:05.74	Mohammad Alidousti; Iran	6:06.73
Medley relay	China; Lin Xiaohai; Lai Jianguang; Zhu Tianci; Yang Jia	1:52.80	Sri Lanka; Bingumina Adithya; Chamindu Sathsara; Nirudaka Vishal; Shanuka Costa	1:52.82	Chinese Taipei; Huang Guan-yao; Chu Chao-feng; Lin Hong-xiang; Lo Chin-hsiang	1:55.82
5000 m walk	Zhang Haoze; China	21:43.82	Lu Yujie; China	22:28.64	Palash Mandal; India	24:48.92
High jump	Huang Kai-lun; Chinese Taipei	2.05	Bi Zaoxin; China	2.03	Zubin Gohain; India	2.03
Pole vault	Tanakorn Daengmanee; Thailand	5.00	Gerfan Nigel Frank; Malaysia	4.50	Jiang Yunfan; Singapore	4.40
Long jump	Yuan Lei; China	7.51	Wang Pengbo; China	7.37	Abdurakhmon Makhamadjonov; Uzbekistan	7.24
Triple jump	Li Aodi; China	15.15	Shakhzodbek Kholmurodov; Uzbekistan	14.80	Gleb Klepinin; Kazakhstan	14.38
Shot put	Jiang Haozheng; China	18.36	Choi Ji-ho; South Korea	17.13	Chaituch Sriwiya; Thailand	16.37
Discus throw	Maxim Sazhnev; Kazakhstan	63.23	Jia Kunchuan; China	62.40	Alireza Samimi; Iran	53.86
Hammer throw	Wang Zihao; China	68.22	Muhammadaziz Nosirov; Uzbekistan	67.85	Mohammed Al-Ali; United Arab Emirates	62.03
Javelin throw	Wu Huaichu; China	68.38	Qiu Bang-xuan; Chinese Taipei	64.91	Chathura Dulanjana; Sri Lanka	62.51

=== Girls ===
Event	Gold		Silver		Bronze	
100 m	Arwa Ashar Ali; United Arab Emirates	11.45	Dana Noor Salem; Qatar	11.60	Yan Xinyi; China	11.79
200 m	Chen Xinxuan; China	24.08	Arwa Ashar Ali; United Arab Emirates	24.14	Bhumika Nehate; India	24.43
400 m	Aisha Tariq Mohammed; United Arab Emirates	54.26	Edwina Jason; India	55.43	Wu Chia-ying; Chinese Taipei	56.60
800 m	Song Jinping; China	2:07.84	Naomi Cesar; Philippines	2:08.69	Gendis Aulia Syafitri; Indonesia	2:14.98
1500 m	Nazmina Rakhimjonova; Uzbekistan	4:51.20	Viktoriya Melnikova; Kazakhstan	4:51.61	Nethmi Gimhani; Sri Lanka	4:52.32
3000 m	Anastasiya Silchenkova; Uzbekistan	9:43.61	Yu Xiaoxuan; China	10:21.85	Aida Akylbekova; Kazakhstan	10:45.21
100 m hurdles	Zhang Keyi; China	13.51	Shourya Ambure; India	13.73	Shodiyona Rahmonova; Uzbekistan	13.89
400 m hurdles	Lin Qiao-ling; Chinese Taipei	1:00.31	Margarita Kossinova; Kazakhstan	1:01.36	Shodiyona Rahmonova; Uzbekistan	1:01.46
2000 m steeplechase	Kang Ryon-hui; North Korea	6:37.88	Nasimakhon Mamirova; Uzbekistan	6:52.41	Li Yecong; China	7:12.58
Medley relay	United Arab Emirates; Laila Safeenah Ahmed; Arwa Ashar Ali; Ezza Nael Nasser; Aisha Tariq Mohammed	2:07.79	India; Shourya Ambure; Bhumika Nehate; Tannu; Edwina Jason	2:09.65	China; Yan Xinyi; Chen Xinxuan; Chen Ming; Zou Yuxin	2:10.14
5000 m walk	Liu Shiyi; China	24:15.27	Ranjana Yadav; India	24:25.88	Jeong Chae-yeon; South Korea	25:26.93
High jump	Yasmeen Roy; Kuwait	1.73	Chen Chiao-ting; Chinese Taipei	1.69	Olga Izyumnikova; Kazakhstan	1.65
High jump	Yasmeen Roy; Kuwait	1.73	Chen Chiao-ting; Chinese Taipei	1.69	Milena Merts; Kazakhstan	1.65
Long jump	Zhou Ruhan; China	5.88	Ri Hyo-jong; North Korea	5.74	Yekaterina Mikhailenko; Kazakhstan	5.74
Triple jump	Xie Yiqing; China	13.28	Zeng Zi-yun; Chinese Taipei	12.36	Dilini Rajapaksha; Sri Lanka	12.31
Shot put	Sun Mengyao; China	18.15	Li Mengyao; China	16.93	Jasmine Kaur; India	14.86
Discus throw	Wang Xinyi; China	55.38	Oshin; India	43.38	Shih Yun-jhen; Chinese Taipei	43.00
Hammer throw	Wang Yiru; China	68.59	Gao Yujia; China	63.08	Veronika Yelisseyeva; Kazakhstan	46.94
Javelin throw	Parizoda Talabova; Uzbekistan	53.08	Bai Xueting; China	51.77	Yang Wenyue; China	50.40

== Medal table ==
Rank	Nation	Gold	Silver	Bronze	Total
1	China (CHN)	20	12	4	36
2	Chinese Taipei (TPE)	3	5	5	13
3	Uzbekistan (UZB)	3	3	3	9
4	United Arab Emirates (UAE)	3	2	1	6
5	Kazakhstan (KAZ)	1	2	7	10
6	Sri Lanka (SRI)	1	1	4	6
7	Saudi Arabia (KSA)	1	1	1	3
8	North Korea (PRK)	1	1	0	2
8	Philippines (PHI)	1	1	0	2
8	Qatar (QAT)	1	1	0	2
11	Thailand (THA)	1	0	1	2
12	Kuwait (KUW)	1	0	0	1
13	India (IND)	0	5	4	9
14	South Korea (KOR)	0	1	2	3
15	Malaysia (MAS)	0	1	0	1
15	Vietnam (VIE)	0	1	0	1
17	Iran (IRI)	0	0	2	2
18	Hong Kong (HKG)	0	0	1	1
18	Indonesia (INA)	0	0	1	1
18	Oman (OMA)	0	0	1	1
18	Singapore (SGP)	0	0	1	1
Totals (21 entries)		37	37	38	112

== Results ==
=== Boys ===
==== 100 m ====
===== Round 1 =====
23 October

Rank	Athlete	Time
Heat 1
1	Raied Al-Bulushi (OMA)	10.98
2	Mohammad Hassan Darvishi (IRI)	11.02
3	Wong Kwok Yau (HKG)	11.08
4	Ghulam Murtaza (PAK)	11.20
5	He Chon Fai (MAC)	11.42
6	Pirguly Rozyýew (TKM)	12.00
7	Castro Amaral (TLS)	13.30
Heat 2
1	Lin Xiaohai (CHN)	10.79
2	Aqief Naufal (MAS)	10.88
3	Kim Sun-woo (KOR)	10.96
4	Joel Platon (PHI)	11.21
5	Mohammad Abushayeb (JOR)	11.27
6	Ankhlaigiin Bat-Orgil (MGL)	11.41
7	Sam Al-Obaidan (BRN)	12.07
8	Phoutthasone Soundala (LAO)	13.69
Heat 3
1	Lai Jianguang (CHN)	10.58
2	Pi Durden Wangkay (PHI)	10.90
3	Donald Muratkaliyev (KAZ)	11.05
4	Hady Abbas (SYR)	11.09
5	Nihal Kamal (IND)	11.16
6	Temtawan Petnugulkait (THA)	11.17
7	Abdulaziz Sabt Eid (UAE)	11.47
8	Moheeb Jalayta (PLE)	11.82
Heat 4
1	Huang Guan-yao (TPE)	10.79
2	Aryan Syahmi (MAS)	10.92
3	Divyansh Kumar Raj (IND)	11.01
4	Patape Pathsuwun (THA)	11.14
5	Shipon Mia (BAN)	11.19
6	Elchin Shirinov (KGZ)	11.49
7	Yousif Al-Assar (BRN)	12.02
8	Reth Rayuth (CAM)	12.21

===== Semifinals =====
23 October

Rank	Athlete	Time
Heat 1
1	Lai Jianguang (CHN)	10.59
2	Pi Durden Wangkay (PHI)	10.83
3	Raied Al-Bulushi (OMA)	10.87
4	Hady Abbas (SYR)	11.00
5	Aqief Naufal (MAS)	11.02
6	Wong Kwok Yau (HKG)	11.06
7	Temtawan Petnugulkait (THA)	11.08
8	Divyansh Kumar Raj (IND)	11.11
Heat 2
1	Lin Xiaohai (CHN)	10.75
2	Huang Guan-yao (TPE)	10.81
3	Aryan Syahmi (MAS)	10.83
4	Kim Sun-woo (KOR)	10.92
5	Mohammad Hassan Darvishi (IRI)	10.92
6	Patape Pathsuwun (THA)	11.02
7	Donald Muratkaliyev (KAZ)	11.06
8	Nihal Kamal (IND)	12.63

===== Final =====
24 October

Rank	Athlete	Time
1st place, gold medalist(s)	Lai Jianguang (CHN)	10.56
2nd place, silver medalist(s)	Lin Xiaohai (CHN)	10.73
3rd place, bronze medalist(s)	Huang Guan-yao (TPE)	10.82
4	Aryan Syahmi (MAS)	10.84
5	Pi Durden Wangkay (PHI)	10.87
6	Kim Sun-woo (KOR)	10.97
7	Raied Al-Bulushi (OMA)	11.01
8	Mohammad Hassan Darvishi (IRI)	11.08

==== 200 m ====
25 October

===== Round 1 =====
Rank	Athlete	Time
Heat 1
1	Zhu Tianci (CHN)	22.13
2	Wang Qiyue (SGP)	22.36
3	Abdullah Al-Jarian (KSA)	22.72
4	Aryan Syahmi (MAS)	22.82
5	Elchin Shirinov (KGZ)	23.24
6	Sam Al-Obaidan (BRN)	25.43
—	Castro Amaral (TLS)	DSQ
Heat 2
1	Kim Sun-woo (KOR)	21.96
2	Pi Durden Wangkay (PHI)	22.22
3	Patape Pathsuwun (THA)	22.39
4	Ramu Lodenga (IND)	22.47
5	Ankhlaigiin Bat-Orgil (MGL)	23.30
6	Moheeb Jalayta (PLE)	23.97
7	Pirguly Rozyýew (TKM)	24.58
Heat 3
1	Chu Chao-feng (TPE)	21.88
2	Raied Al-Bulushi (OMA)	21.94
3	Aqief Naufal (MAS)	21.99
4	Thanaphon Makying (THA)	22.26
5	Abdulaziz Sabt Eid (UAE)	22.87
6	He Chon Fai (MAC)	23.05
7	Ghulam Murtaza (PAK)	23.78
8	Phoutthasone Soundala (LAO)	28.19

===== Final =====
Rank	Athlete	Time
1st place, gold medalist(s)	Pi Durden Wangkay (PHI)	21.76
2nd place, silver medalist(s)	Chu Chao-feng (TPE)	21.90
3rd place, bronze medalist(s)	Kim Sun-woo (KOR)	21.93
4	Zhu Tianci (CHN)	21.96
5	Raied Al-Bulushi (OMA)	21.97
6	Aqief Naufal (MAS)	22.32
7	Wang Qiyue (SGP)	22.49
—	Thanaphon Makying (THA)	DSQ

==== 400 m ====
===== Round 1 =====
23 October

Rank	Athlete	Time
Heat 1
1	Yang Jia (CHN)	47.51
2	Saeed Shoaib Omar (UAE)	47.53
3	Ramu Lodenga (IND)	49.62
4	Lau Hoi Tsun (HKG)	49.90
5	Nitiphum Chalapkham (THA)	50.31
6	Hady Abbas (SYR)	50.67
7	Yernur Turdaly (KAZ)	55.83
8	Talal Nawaf Al-Doseri (BRN)	59.78
Heat 2
1	Shanuka Costa (SRI)	47.79
2	Kim Jun (KOR)	48.82
3	Peeraphat Honna (THA)	49.79
4	Georgiy Glagolev (KAZ)	49.83
5	Sean Russell Tay (SGP)	49.84
6	Ibrahim Al-Gahtani (KSA)	50.21
7	Sami Islam Sani (BAN)	51.16

===== Final =====
24 October

Rank	Athlete	Time
1st place, gold medalist(s)	Yang Jia (CHN)	46.57
2nd place, silver medalist(s)	Saeed Shoaib Omar (UAE)	47.18
3rd place, bronze medalist(s)	Shanuka Costa (SRI)	47.72
4	Kim Jun (KOR)	48.75
5	Ramu Lodenga (IND)	49.51
6	Sean Russell Tay (SGP)	49.89
7	Georgiy Glagolev (KAZ)	52.51
8	Peeraphat Honna (THA)	55.16

==== 800 m ====
===== Round 1 =====
24 October

Rank	Athlete	Time
Heat 1
1	Dmitriy Spaskiy (KAZ)	1:59.66
2	Kritchaphat Thongrak (THA)	1:59.75
3	Bashar Sharahili (KSA)	1:59.80
4	Hwang Hyun-seung (KOR)	2:02.32
5	Elsuior Khabibullaev (KGZ)	2:02.63
6	Ahmed Barahma (PLE)	2:08.81
Heat 2
1	Al-Yazan Al-Shamsi (OMA)	1:56.20
2	Khalaf Al-Bishi (KSA)	1:57.89
3	Nethan Willaddara (SRI)	1:58.08
4	Syukri Nazim Mydin (MAS)	1:58.16
5	Bekzhan Temirbekov (KGZ)	2:06.89
6	Kinley Dawa Tshering (BHU)	2:13.86

===== Final =====
25 October

Rank	Athlete	Time
1st place, gold medalist(s)	Bashar Sharahili (KSA)	1:57.04
2nd place, silver medalist(s)	Khalaf Al-Bishi (KSA)	1:57.73
3rd place, bronze medalist(s)	Al-Yazan Al-Shamsi (OMA)	1:58.79
4	Syukri Nazim Mydin (MAS)	1:59.47
5	Dmitriy Spaskiy (KAZ)	2:01.23
6	Kritchaphat Thongrak (THA)	2:01.81
7	Nethan Willaddara (SRI)	2:01.93
8	Hwang Hyun-seung (KOR)	2:17.69

==== 1500 m ====
23 October

Rank	Athlete	Time
1st place, gold medalist(s)	Lahiru Achintha (SRI)	3:57.42
2nd place, silver medalist(s)	Sha Lihua (CHN)	3:58.73
3rd place, bronze medalist(s)	Au Ho Chun (HKG)	4:05.09
4	Bandar Al-Muwallad (KSA)	4:07.73
5	Kim Seong-hyeon (KOR)	4:09.97
6	Nasser Al-Kaabi (UAE)	4:12.71
7	Thanaphon Kamuttachat (THA)	4:21.20
8	Sergelenbatyn Batjavkhlan (MGL)	4:41.09

==== 3000 m ====
26 October

Rank	Athlete	Time
1st place, gold medalist(s)	Wang Cheng-yu (TPE)	8:34.46
2nd place, silver medalist(s)	Li Zicheng (CHN)	8:55.76
3rd place, bronze medalist(s)	Nurbolsyn Murat (KAZ)	9:07.81
4	Mayed Al-Kaabi (UAE)	9:16.30
5	Asilbek Tukhtamurodov (UZB)	9:18.70
6	Nazril Albani Fauzi (INA)	9:18.94
7	Adilkhan Okumbekov (KGZ)	9:42.91
8	Baglan Yermek (KAZ)	9:43.94
9	Abdulkhaleq Munassar (YEM)	10:45.60
10	Phalakon Kulseeda (THA)	10:51.59

==== 110 m hurdles ====
23 October

===== Round 1 =====
Rank	Athlete	Time
Heat 1
1	Naif Al-Smairi (KSA)	13.93
2	Chang Wen-chi (TPE)	14.27
3	Phodcharapol Kosajun (THA)	14.58
4	Muhammad Fauzan Jakariya (INA)	15.04
Heat 2
1	Aboubakar Idriss (QAT)	13.86
2	Kisal Oshadha Gagandara (SRI)	14.01
3	Tao Kaidi (CHN)	14.03
4	Ahmed Sufyani (KSA)	14.22
5	Go Hyeon-jun (KOR)	14.57

===== Final =====
Rank	Athlete	Time
1st place, gold medalist(s)	Aboubakar Idriss (QAT)	13.61
2nd place, silver medalist(s)	Tao Kaidi (CHN)	14.11
3rd place, bronze medalist(s)	Naif Al-Smairi (KSA)	14.12
4	Phodcharapol Kosajun (THA)	14.37
5	Go Hyeon-jun (KOR)	14.70
—	Ahmed Sufyani (KSA)	DSQ
—	Kisal Oshadha Gagandara (SRI)	DSQ
—	Chang Wen-chi (TPE)	DNS

==== 400 m hurdles ====
===== Round 1 =====
24 October

Rank	Athlete	Time
Heat 1
1	Daryen Ko (SGP)	53.52
2	Lo Chin-hsiang (TPE)	53.79
3	Wu Mingwei (CHN)	53.90
4	Huang Iat Hin (MAC)	56.22
5	Sutanut Jantarak (THA)	58.36
Heat 2
1	Lin Hong-xiang (TPE)	54.64
2	Zacharry Lawrence (MAS)	55.57
3	Yee Ching Kwan (HKG)	56.04
4	Adison Sriwichan (THA)	56.47
5	Amir Asgari (IRI)	56.86
6	Methuka Malhiru (SRI)	58.42

===== Final =====
25 October

Rank	Athlete	Time
1st place, gold medalist(s)	Wu Mingwei (CHN)	52.72
2nd place, silver medalist(s)	Lin Hong-xiang (TPE)	53.10
3rd place, bronze medalist(s)	Lo Chin-hsiang (TPE)	53.55
4	Daryen Ko (SGP)	53.56
5	Zacharry Lawrence (MAS)	54.22
6	Huang Iat Hin (MAC)	55.04
7	Adison Sriwichan (THA)	55.46
8	Yee Ching Kwan (HKG)	56.70

==== 2000 m steeplechase ====
25 October

Rank	Athlete	Time
1st place, gold medalist(s)	Xu Chengwei (CHN)	5:52.99
2nd place, silver medalist(s)	Bùi Tuấn Tú (VIE)	6:05.74
3rd place, bronze medalist(s)	Mohammad Alidousti (IRI)	6:06.73
4	Kobiljon Rahmatov (UZB)	6:07.18
5	Ayoub Masrahi (KSA)	6:13.25
6	Huang Yi (TPE)	6:17.82
7	Kaisar Iliyas (KAZ)	6:25.86
8	Ahmad Zubayr (SGP)	6:28.37
9	Chirantha Deshan (SRI)	6:30.75
10	Rabea Al-Sarari (YEM)	6:32.81
11	Yerkhan Talgat (KAZ)	6:33.92
12	Hamed Al-Riyami (OMA)	6:36.43
13	Liu Haoyue (SGP)	6:41.28
14	Yahea Sufyani (KSA)	6:54.54
15	Numonkhon Habibulloev (TJK)	7:17.46

==== Medley relay ====
26 October

Rank	Team	Time
1st place, gold medalist(s)	China (CHN)	1:52.80
2nd place, silver medalist(s)	Sri Lanka (SRI)	1:52.82
3rd place, bronze medalist(s)	Chinese Taipei (TPE)	1:55.82
4	Thailand (THA)	1:56.03
5	India (IND)	1:59.96
6	Kazakhstan (KAZ)	2:03.18
—	Saudi Arabia (KSA)	DNF
—	Kyrgyzstan (KGZ)	DSQ

==== 5000 m walk ====
24 October

Rank	Athlete	Time
1st place, gold medalist(s)	Zhang Haoze (CHN)	21:43.82
2nd place, silver medalist(s)	Lu Yujie (CHN)	22:28.64
3rd place, bronze medalist(s)	Palash Mandal (IND)	24:48.92
—	Murat Moldash (KAZ)	DNF

==== High jump ====
24 October

Rank	Athlete	Result
1st place, gold medalist(s)	Huang Kai-lun (TPE)	2.05
2nd place, silver medalist(s)	Bi Zaoxin (CHN)	2.03
3rd place, bronze medalist(s)	Zubin Gohain (IND)	2.03
4	Himanshu Kumar Singh (IND)	2.03
5	Lin Yu-en (TPE)	1.97
6	Ariff Haikal (MAS)	1.85
6	Maxat Bazarbayev (KAZ)	1.85
8	Husamaldin Al-Bayaee (SYR)	1.85
9	Sayed Ahmed Khalaf (BRN)	1.80
10	Chow Tin Nok (HKG)	1.75

==== Pole vault ====
26 October

Rank	Athlete	Result
1st place, gold medalist(s)	Tanakorn Daengmanee (THA)	5.00
2nd place, silver medalist(s)	Gerfan Nigel Frank (MAS)	4.50
3rd place, bronze medalist(s)	Jiang Yunfan (SGP)	4.40
4	Haydar Al-Ruqih (KSA)	4.30
5	Mahdi Al-Sebaghah (KUW)	4.30
—	Nasser Al-Atbi (QAT)	NM

==== Long jump ====
25 October

Rank	Athlete	Result
1st place, gold medalist(s)	Yuan Lei (CHN)	7.51
2nd place, silver medalist(s)	Wang Pengbo (CHN)	7.37
3rd place, bronze medalist(s)	Abdurakhmon Makhamadjonov (UZB)	7.24
4	Andrey Kim (KAZ)	7.15
5	Park Sang-hyun (KOR)	7.00
6	Rusith Nimsara (SRI)	6.75
7	Darwiesy Rosyaiedyn (MAS)	6.71
8	Kang Yo-han (KOR)	6.50
9	Irfan Yousaf (BRN)	6.50
10	Lu Wei-hong (TPE)	6.47
11	Pradeep Kumar (IND)	6.45
12	Abas Al-Abdulbaqi (KSA)	6.44
13	Ahmed Al-Salah (KSA)	6.12
14	Abdulrahman Al-Azemi (KUW)	6.07
15	Teeradon Susilaporn (THA)	5.82
16	Joel Platon (PHI)	5.68

==== Triple jump ====
23 October

Rank	Athlete	Result
1st place, gold medalist(s)	Li Aodi (CHN)	15.15
2nd place, silver medalist(s)	Shakhzodbek Kholmurodov (UZB)	14.80
3rd place, bronze medalist(s)	Gleb Klepinin (KAZ)	14.38
4	Savindu Sudharaka (SRI)	14.16
5	Chetsada Sekkla (THA)	14.05
6	Randy Ryann Samson (MAS)	13.98
7	Kang Yo-han (KOR)	13.84
8	Go Hyeon-jun (KOR)	13.82
9	Ayman Sawm (KSA)	13.46
10	Muhammad Adam (MAS)	13.18

==== Shot put ====
25 October

Rank	Athlete	Result
1st place, gold medalist(s)	Jiang Haozheng (CHN)	18.36
2nd place, silver medalist(s)	Choi Ji-ho (KOR)	17.13
3rd place, bronze medalist(s)	Chaituch Sriwiya (THA)	16.37
4	Ravi (IND)	16.23
5	Maxim Sazhnev (KAZ)	16.23
6	Chun Seung-min (KOR)	15.76
7	Jorez Puang (MAS)	15.57
8	Phadasai Nasaeng (THA)	15.42
9	Bader Al-Bishi (KSA)	14.23
10	Khalifa Yousif Mubarak (BRN)	9.11
11	Tameem Khatib (PLE)	6.81

==== Discus throw ====
26 October

Rank	Athlete	Result
1st place, gold medalist(s)	Maxim Sazhnev (KAZ)	63.23
2nd place, silver medalist(s)	Jia Kunchuan (CHN)	62.40
3rd place, bronze medalist(s)	Alireza Samimi (IRI)	53.86
4	Korapat Pongsiripun (THA)	53.83
5	Ali Asghar Shahi (IRI)	52.93
6	Swapnil Dutta (IND)	51.53
7	Lee Yu Foong (SGP)	46.03
8	Abdulrahman Al-Rashidi (KUW)	41.32
9	Muhammad Behram (PAK)	29.01
10	Faiz Muhammad Hussain (PAK)	22.27
—	Mohammed Al-Subaei (KSA)	NM
—	Azizbek Abdugafforov (UZB)	NM

==== Hammer throw ====
23 October

Rank	Athlete	Result
1st place, gold medalist(s)	Wang Zihao (CHN)	68.22
2nd place, silver medalist(s)	Muhammadaziz Nosirov (UZB)	67.85
3rd place, bronze medalist(s)	Mohammed Al-Ali (UAE)	62.03
4	Wiriya Susunkoolton (THA)	57.45
5	Mansour Dahish (KSA)	57.05
6	Abdulkareem Al-Hasan (KUW)	56.70
7	Khursandmurod Ghaniev (TJK)	46.89

==== Javelin throw ====
24 October

Rank	Athlete	Result
1st place, gold medalist(s)	Wu Huaichu (CHN)	68.38
2nd place, silver medalist(s)	Qiu Bang-xuan (TPE)	64.91
3rd place, bronze medalist(s)	Chathura Dulanjana (SRI)	62.51
4	Prince (IND)	61.92
5	Temirlan Amangali (KAZ)	58.14
6	Bunyodbek Khudoiqulov (TJK)	57.34
7	Eom Ha-rang (KOR)	55.68
8	Fenddenlean Labas (MAS)	55.52
9	Wu Chieh-kai (TPE)	55.44
10	Kristostomus Kaiza (INA)	54.98
11	Nakarin Sukkaew (THA)	53.46
12	Lee Chin Thern (MAS)	53.43
13	Nurzat Galymuly (KAZ)	53.22
—	Vikran Khongthong (THA)	DNS

=== Girls ===
==== 100 m ====
===== Round 1 =====
23 October

Rank	Athlete	Time
Heat 1
1	Arwa Ashar Ali (UAE)	11.84
2	Chen Xinxuan (CHN)	11.87
3	Pinsiri Ramphuengnit (THA)	12.06
4	Yuliya Dyomkina (KAZ)	12.31
5	Ser-Odyn Nomin-Od (MGL)	12.91
6	Iqra Riaz (PAK)	13.09
7	Areen Tulbah (KSA)	13.19
Heat 2
1	Yan Xinyi (CHN)	11.87
2	Tharani Nirmina (SRI)	12.36
3	Son Ye-rin (KOR)	12.49
4	Lok Ka Io (MAC)	13.38
5	Amardalaigiin Tselmeg (MGL)	13.88
6	Hala Assaf (JOR)	13.96
7	Lasoy Keomanivong (LAO)	15.99
Heat 3
1	Dana Noor Salem (QAT)	11.86
2	Laila Safeenah Ahmed (UAE)	11.99
3	Nattawadee Watarujikrit (THA)	12.21
4	Cheng An-ti (TPE)	12.34
5	Caitlin Ng (SGP)	12.42
6	Cheang Chi Wai (MAC)	13.50
7	Amathulhohi Binthu Yaamin (MDV)	13.68
Heat 4
1	Su Yi-han (TPE)	12.12
2	Wong Wing Tung (HKG)	12.31
3	Shannon Tan (SGP)	12.53
4	Shuaa Ahmed Rishfan (MDV)	13.53
5	Shaikha Ahmed Mubarak (BRN)	14.04

===== Semifinals =====
23 October

Rank	Athlete	Time
Heat 1
1	Dana Noor Salem (QAT)	11.70
2	Yan Xinyi (CHN)	11.87
3	Laila Safeenah Ahmed (UAE)	11.89
4	Nattawadee Watarujikrit (THA)	12.12
5	Cheng An-ti (TPE)	12.21
6	Wong Wing Tung (HKG)	12.25
7	Shannon Tan (SGP)	12.33
8	Ser-Odyn Nomin-Od (MGL)	12.69
Heat 2
1	Arwa Ashar Ali (UAE)	11.66
2	Chen Xinxuan (CHN)	11.78
3	Su Yi-han (TPE)	12.03
4	Pinsiri Ramphuengnit (THA)	12.07
5	Yuliya Dyomkina (KAZ)	12.22
6	Caitlin Ng (SGP)	12.36
7	Tharani Nirmina (SRI)	12.37
8	Son Ye-rin (KOR)	12.44

===== Final =====
24 October

Rank	Athlete	Time
1st place, gold medalist(s)	Arwa Ashar Ali (UAE)	11.45
2nd place, silver medalist(s)	Dana Noor Salem (QAT)	11.60
3rd place, bronze medalist(s)	Yan Xinyi (CHN)	11.79
4	Chen Xinxuan (CHN)	11.81
5	Pinsiri Ramphuengnit (THA)	11.93
6	Su Yi-han (TPE)	11.98
7	Laila Safeenah Ahmed (UAE)	12.00
8	Nattawadee Watarujikrit (THA)	12.10

==== 200 m ====
25 October

===== Round 1 =====
Rank	Athlete	Time
Heat 1
1	Chen Xinxuan (CHN)	24.61
2	Arwa Ashar Ali (UAE)	24.71
3	Yuliya Dyomkina (KAZ)	24.90
4	Tharani Nirmina (SRI)	25.35
5	Loraine Batalla (PHI)	26.01
6	Diana Dunaeva (KGZ)	27.74
7	Lasoy Keomanivong (LAO)	33.40
Heat 2
1	Chen Ming (CHN)	24.91
2	Dana Noor Salem (QAT)	25.08
3	Thitiwarada Panyadee (THA)	26.20
4	Areen Tulbah (KSA)	27.31
5	Mariyam Maiha Hamdan (MDV)	28.44
—	Bermet Zamirova (KGZ)	DNS
Heat 3
1	Bhumika Nehate (IND)	25.07
2	Son Ye-rin (KOR)	25.91
3	Aminath Luhya Ahmed (MDV)	26.86
4	Iqra Riaz (PAK)	26.92
5	Ariunboldyn Altantuyaa (MGL)	27.41
—	Shaikha Ahmed Mubarak (BRN)	DNS

===== Final =====
Rank	Athlete	Time
1st place, gold medalist(s)	Chen Xinxuan (CHN)	24.08
2nd place, silver medalist(s)	Arwa Ashar Ali (UAE)	24.14
3rd place, bronze medalist(s)	Bhumika Nehate (IND)	24.43
4	Chen Ming (CHN)	24.72
5	Yuliya Dyomkina (KAZ)	24.74
6	Dana Noor Salem (QAT)	24.79
7	Tharani Nirmina (SRI)	25.37
—	Son Ye-rin (KOR)	DNS

==== 400 m ====
===== Round 1 =====
23 October

Rank	Athlete	Time
Heat 1
1	Edwina Jason (IND)	55.71
2	Wu Chia-ying (TPE)	57.21
3	Phichayapha Sukaue (THA)	57.52
4	Zou Yuxin (CHN)	57.64
5	Loraine Batalla (PHI)	58.55
6	Chenadi Dewhara (SRI)	59.92
7	Ng Ka Fu (MAC)	1:02.35
8	Diana Dunaeva (KGZ)	1:05.22
Heat 2
1	Aisha Tariq Mohammed (UAE)	54.42
2	Liu Yu-zhen (TPE)	57.53
3	Tannu (IND)	57.54
4	Warinthon Donain (THA)	57.78
5	Princess Praise Eromole (PHI)	58.08
6	Hasti Norouzi (IRI)	58.17
7	Bermet Zamirova (KGZ)	59.62
8	Ariunboldyn Altantuyaa (MGL)	1:05.36

===== Final =====
24 October

Rank	Athlete	Time
1st place, gold medalist(s)	Aisha Tariq Mohammed (UAE)	54.26
2nd place, silver medalist(s)	Edwina Jason (IND)	55.43
3rd place, bronze medalist(s)	Wu Chia-ying (TPE)	56.60
4	Phichayapha Sukaue (THA)	57.46
5	Liu Yu-zhen (TPE)	57.50
6	Zou Yuxin (CHN)	57.60
7	Warinthon Donain (THA)	58.11
8	Tannu (IND)	58.49

==== 800 m ====
===== Round 1 =====
24 October

Rank	Athlete	Time
Heat 1
1	Naomi Cesar (PHI)	2:19.74
2	Han Ji-hye (KOR)	2:20.83
3	Gendis Aulia Syafitri (INA)	2:21.02
4	Diana Salmina (KAZ)	2:23.10
5	Margarita Iurchenko (KGZ)	2:27.05
6	Albina Daşdemirowa (TKM)	2:35.33
Heat 2
1	Song Jinping (CHN)	2:16.28
2	Mia Guillergan (PHI)	2:20.09
3	Jalila Kanat (KAZ)	2:21.38
4	Chimmi Pelden (BHU)	2:37.18
5	Rama Al-Mughrabi (PLE)	3:40.16

===== Final =====
25 October

Rank	Athlete	Time
1st place, gold medalist(s)	Song Jinping (CHN)	2:07.84
2nd place, silver medalist(s)	Naomi Cesar (PHI)	2:08.69
3rd place, bronze medalist(s)	Gendis Aulia Syafitri (INA)	2:14.98
4	Han Ji-hye (KOR)	2:17.21
5	Mia Guillergan (PHI)	2:17.93
6	Jalila Kanat (KAZ)	2:18.21
7	Diana Salmina (KAZ)	2:24.56
8	Margarita Iurchenko (KGZ)	2:27.23

==== 1500 m ====
23 October

Rank	Athlete	Time
1st place, gold medalist(s)	Nazmina Rakhimjonova (UZB)	4:51.20
2nd place, silver medalist(s)	Viktoriya Melnikova (KAZ)	4:51.61
3rd place, bronze medalist(s)	Nethmi Gimhani (SRI)	4:52.32
4	Hoàng Lê Quỳnh Như (VIE)	4:52.49
5	Meryem Salek (QAT)	5:05.94
6	Ayana Beishenalieva (KGZ)	5:06.16
7	Agata Krassayeva (KAZ)	5:08.75
8	Sawitta Wangkhunprom (THA)	5:28.92

==== 3000 m ====
26 October

Rank	Athlete	Time
1st place, gold medalist(s)	Anastasiya Silchenkova (UZB)	9:43.61
2nd place, silver medalist(s)	Yu Xiaoxuan (CHN)	10:21.85
3rd place, bronze medalist(s)	Aida Akylbekova (KAZ)	10:45.21
4	Tawus Gapurjanowa (TKM)	11:00.98
5	Nur Denisha Shazliatie (MAS)	11:42.52
6	An Pisey (CAM)	13:45.56
—	Mary Mae Magbanua (PHI)	DNF

==== 100 m hurdles ====
23 October

===== Round 1 =====
Rank	Athlete	Time
Heat 1
1	Zhang Keyi (CHN)	13.58
2	Shourya Ambure (IND)	14.00
3	Shodiyona Rahmonova (UZB)	14.14
4	Angelina Shrubyanets (KAZ)	14.32
5	Ser-Odyn Nomin-Od (MGL)	14.73
6	Tam Yan Q (HKG)	14.92
Heat 2
1	Fu Yijia (CHN)	14.13
2	Kim Seo-hyun (KOR)	14.19
3	Niginabonu Rajabova (UZB)	14.32
4	Alexandra Yevteyeva (KAZ)	14.38
5	Phawita Pulamool (THA)	14.79
6	Chamalsha Dewmini (SRI)	14.96

===== Final =====
Rank	Athlete	Time
1st place, gold medalist(s)	Zhang Keyi (CHN)	13.51
2nd place, silver medalist(s)	Shourya Ambure (IND)	13.73
3rd place, bronze medalist(s)	Shodiyona Rahmonova (UZB)	13.89
4	Fu Yijia (CHN)	13.94
5	Kim Seo-hyun (KOR)	14.11
6	Alexandra Yevteyeva (KAZ)	14.22
7	Niginabonu Rajabova (UZB)	14.30
—	Angelina Shrubyanets (KAZ)	DNF

==== 400 m hurdles ====
===== Round 1 =====
24 October

Rank	Athlete	Time
Heat 1
1	Lin Qiao-ling (TPE)	1:01.31
2	Niginabonu Rajabova (UZB)	1:03.93
3	Afina Cholakidi (KAZ)	1:04.37
4	Shienna Sarsonas (PHI)	1:04.64
5	Tng Kai Xin (SGP)	1:06.31
6	Fatimah Al-Khalifah (KUW)	1:15.04
Heat 2
1	Shodiyona Rahmonova (UZB)	1:01.96
2	Amaya Peduru Hewa (SRI)	1:03.00
3	Bai Shihan (CHN)	1:03.40
4	Margarita Kossinova (KAZ)	1:03.75
5	Nur Farisha Adreana (MAS)	1:06.59
6	Achiraya Kongsuwan (THA)	1:10.94

===== Final =====
25 October

Rank	Athlete	Time
1st place, gold medalist(s)	Lin Qiao-ling (TPE)	1:00.31
2nd place, silver medalist(s)	Margarita Kossinova (KAZ)	1:01.36
3rd place, bronze medalist(s)	Shodiyona Rahmonova (UZB)	1:01.46
4	Amaya Peduru Hewa (SRI)	1:01.72
5	Bai Shihan (CHN)	1:03.30
6	Shienna Sarsonas (PHI)	1:05.67
7	Afina Cholakidi (KAZ)	1:05.85
8	Niginabonu Rajabova (UZB)	1:06.31

==== 2000 m steeplechase ====
24 October

Rank	Athlete	Time
1st place, gold medalist(s)	Kang Ryon-hui (PRK)	6:37.88
2nd place, silver medalist(s)	Nasimakhon Mamirova (UZB)	6:52.41
3rd place, bronze medalist(s)	Li Yecong (CHN)	7:12.58
4	Mehrinoza Umaralieva (UZB)	7:16.27
5	Raha Ahmadi (IRI)	7:32.99
6	Yekaterina Tamilina (KAZ)	7:33.37
7	Miroslava Agapitova (KAZ)	8:10.41

==== Medley relay ====
26 October

===== Round 1 =====
Rank	Team	Time
Heat 1
1	China (CHN)	2:14.82
2	Sri Lanka (SRI)	2:18.02
3	Maldives (MDV)	2:31.25
—	Macau (MAC)	DNF
Heat 2
1	United Arab Emirates (UAE)	2:10.13
2	India (IND)	2:12.00
3	Chinese Taipei (TPE)	2:13.96
4	Thailand (THA)	2:14.98
5	Philippines (PHI)	2:18.45
6	Kazakhstan (KAZ)	2:20.07
—	Kyrgyzstan (KGZ)	DSQ

===== Final =====
Rank	Team	Time
1st place, gold medalist(s)	United Arab Emirates (UAE)	2:07.79
2nd place, silver medalist(s)	India (IND)	2:09.65
3rd place, bronze medalist(s)	China (CHN)	2:10.14
4	Chinese Taipei (TPE)	2:12.92
5	Thailand (THA)	2:13.43
6	Sri Lanka (SRI)	2:18.65
7	Maldives (MDV)	2:32.68
—	Philippines (PHI)	DNS

==== 5000 m walk ====
23 October

Rank	Athlete	Time
1st place, gold medalist(s)	Liu Shiyi (CHN)	24:15.27
2nd place, silver medalist(s)	Ranjana Yadav (IND)	24:25.88
3rd place, bronze medalist(s)	Jeong Chae-yeon (KOR)	25:26.93
4	Riya Rathore (IND)	27:14.34
5	Zheng Wenyu (CHN)	27:24.28
6	Julia Amoun (SYR)	27:34.27
7	Akberen Koztayeva (KAZ)	28:51.43
8	Nattanicha Suwanraksa (THA)	28:58.39

==== High jump ====
26 October

Rank	Athlete	Result
1st place, gold medalist(s)	Yasmeen Roy (KUW)	1.73
2nd place, silver medalist(s)	Chen Chiao-ting (TPE)	1.69
3rd place, bronze medalist(s)	Olga Izyumnikova (KAZ)	1.65
3rd place, bronze medalist(s)	Milena Merts (KAZ)	1.65
5	Liu Tzu-yu (TPE)	1.60
6	Gao Tianjing (CHN)	1.60
7	Dilnura Khaydarova (UZB)	1.60
7	Leung Nga Yin (HKG)	1.60
9	Kodchakon Sroemsiri (THA)	1.50
10	Yashvitha Potanapalli (IND)	1.50

==== Long jump ====
25 October

Rank	Athlete	Result
1st place, gold medalist(s)	Zhou Ruhan (CHN)	5.88
2nd place, silver medalist(s)	Ri Hyo-jong (PRK)	5.74
3rd place, bronze medalist(s)	Yekaterina Mikhailenko (KAZ)	5.74
4	Yana Normatova (UZB)	5.74
5	Hsu An-tung (TPE)	5.73
6	Liu Pei-jie (TPE)	5.72
7	Lau Hoi Ying (HKG)	5.58
8	Dilini Rajapaksha (SRI)	5.50
9	Milena Merts (KAZ)	5.44
10	Jyoti Jangid (IND)	5.34
11	Obami Murmu (IND)	5.33
12	Lee Ha-eun (KOR)	5.09
13	Chananporn Saburt (THA)	4.95
14	Wang Ka Wai (MAC)	4.85
15	Titapa Homehong (THA)	4.82
16	Ghazal Othman (SYR)	4.64

==== Triple jump ====
26 October

Rank	Athlete	Result
1st place, gold medalist(s)	Xie Yiqing (CHN)	13.28
2nd place, silver medalist(s)	Zeng Zi-yun (TPE)	12.36
3rd place, bronze medalist(s)	Dilini Rajapaksha (SRI)	12.31
4	Alissa Issayeva (KAZ)	12.05
5	Yekaterina Mikhailenko (KAZ)	11.96
6	Liu Pei-jie (TPE)	11.85
7	Pannakarn Kulmanochwong (THA)	11.07
8	Chananporn Saburt (THA)	10.87
9	Amardalaigiin Tselmeg (MGL)	9.50

==== Shot put ====
23 October

Rank	Athlete	Result
1st place, gold medalist(s)	Sun Mengyao (CHN)	18.15
2nd place, silver medalist(s)	Li Mengyao (CHN)	16.93
3rd place, bronze medalist(s)	Jasmine Kaur (IND)	14.86
4	Kim Tae-bin (KOR)	14.61
5	Saba Ezzatabadipour (IRI)	14.55
6	Joy Baidwan (IND)	14.53
7	Parizod Abdullaeva (UZB)	14.49
8	Ng Jing Jun (MAS)	13.91
9	Choindonsürengiin Oyuun-Erdene (MGL)	10.73

==== Discus throw ====
24 October

Rank	Athlete	Result
1st place, gold medalist(s)	Wang Xinyi (CHN)	55.38
2nd place, silver medalist(s)	Oshin (IND)	43.38
3rd place, bronze medalist(s)	Shih Yun-jhen (TPE)	43.00
4	Kim Tae-bin (KOR)	39.77
5	Nur Aina Aleefa (MAS)	36.23
6	Alina Yussupova (KAZ)	35.21
7	Nopparat Rumwisai (THA)	31.06
—	Battömöriin Erkhsaran (MGL)	NM
—	Susanna Lorenza Roger (MAS)	NM

==== Hammer throw ====
25 October

Rank	Athlete	Result
1st place, gold medalist(s)	Wang Yiru (CHN)	68.59
2nd place, silver medalist(s)	Gao Yujia (CHN)	63.08
3rd place, bronze medalist(s)	Veronika Yelisseyeva (KAZ)	46.94
4	Jirapinya Petthongyu (THA)	46.24
5	Sofiya Diorditsa (TJK)	41.86

==== Javelin throw ====
26 October

Rank	Athlete	Result
1st place, gold medalist(s)	Parizoda Talabova (UZB)	53.08
2nd place, silver medalist(s)	Bai Xueting (CHN)	51.77
3rd place, bronze medalist(s)	Yang Wenyue (CHN)	50.40
4	Nalin Thongseenuch (THA)	48.95
5	Park Hye-lin (KOR)	47.13
6	Wu Pin-yan (TPE)	44.44
7	Siya Banjara (IND)	42.32
8	Misti Karmakar (IND)	42.05
9	Kristel Lam (SGP)	40.10
