= Alexey Sivokon =

Kazakhstani powerlifter

Personal information
- Born: 7 September 1973 (age 52) Temirtau, Kazakhstan

Sport
- Sport: Powerlifting
Medal record
Representing Kazakhstan
World championships
Silver medal – second place	1991 Orebro	67.5 kg
Gold medal – first place	1993 Jonkoping	67.5 kg
Gold medal – first place	1994 Johannesburg	67.5 kg
Gold medal – first place	1997 Prague	67.5 kg
Gold medal – first place	1998 Cherkasy	67.5 kg
Gold medal – first place	1999 Trento	67.5 kg
Gold medal – first place	2000 Akita	67.5 kg
Gold medal – first place	2001 Sotkamo	67.5 kg
World Games
Gold medal – first place	1997 Lathi	Lightweight
Gold medal – first place	2001 Akita	Lightweight

Alexey Sivokon (Russian: Алексей Николаевич Сивоконь, born 7 September 1973) is a Kazakhstani powerlifting competitor who won seven world titles between 1993 and 2001. He was six times the strongest on Asian Championships. Two times won World Games. He won seven times Bench Press World Championships.
