= Sutrisno Bin Darimin =

Indonesian powerlifter

Personal information
- Born: 1975 (age 50–51)

Sport
- Country: Indonesia
- Sport: Powerlifting
Medal record
Men's powerlifting
Representing Indonesia
World Games
Silver medal – second place	1997 Lahti	Lightweight
World Championships
Gold medal – first place	1996 Salzburg	60 kg
Gold medal – first place	2001 Sotkamo	60 kg
Gold medal – first place	2005 Miami	60 kg
Silver medal – second place	2004 Cape Town	60 kg
Silver medal – second place	2008 St. Johns	60 kg
Asian Championships
Gold medal – first place	1996 Almaty	60 kg
Gold medal – first place	2002 Dong Hae	60 kg
Gold medal – first place	2007 Kaohsiung	60 kg
Silver medal – second place	1994 Quezon City	60 kg
World Junior Championships
Gold medal – first place	1994 Denpasar	60 kg
Gold medal – first place	1995 New Delhi	60 kg

Sutrisno Bin Darimin (born 1975) is an Indonesian powerlifter. He won three gold medals at the World Championships. In 2005, he broke the world record. The record that Sutrisno made was a total lift of 742.5 kg.
