= Indonesian Olympic Committee =

National Olympic Committee

- Country: Indonesia
- [[|]]
- Code: INA
- Created: 19 January 1947; 78 years ago
- Recognized: 11 March 1952; 73 years ago
- Continental Association: OCA
- Headquarters: Jakarta, Indonesia
- President: Raja Sapta Oktohari
- Secretary General: Wijaya Noeradi
- Website: nocindonesia.id

The Indonesian Olympic Committee (Indonesian: Komite Olimpiade Indonesia, KOI) (IOC Code: INA) is the national Olympic committee of Indonesia and the member of Olympic Council of Asia. Their duty is to organize Indonesian participation in international sporting events, such as Summer Olympic Games, Asian Games, and Southeast Asian Games. They are also responsible for submitting bid for Indonesia as the host, planning and organizing official international sporting events to be held in Indonesia.

== History ==
The Indonesian Olympic Committee was founded on January 19, 1947, with Sri Sultan Hamengkubuwono IX as the first president. KOI immediately contacted the IOC, asking to be an IOC member. In February 10, KOI sent a letter declaring its intention to send Indonesian athletes to the 1948 Olympics in London. However, domestic security situation pertaining to the Second Dutch military aggression prevented KOI to send athletes to the event.

KOI finally became a member of International Olympic Committee (IOC) on 11 March 1952.

== Organization ==
The Executive Board

- President: Raja Sapta Oktohari
- Vice President: Ismail Ning
- Secretary General: Wijaya Noeradi
- Vice Secretary General I: Daniel Loy
- Vice Secretary General II: Desra Firza Ghazfan
- Vice Secretary General III: Cresida Mariska
- Treasurer: Tommy Hermawan Lo
- Vice Treasurer I: Aang Sunadji
- Vice Treasurer II: Richard Sam Bera
- Executive Committee:
  1. Jadi Rajagukguk
  2. Hengky Silatang
  3. Josephine Tampubolon
  4. Endri Erawan
  5. Antonius Adi Wirawan
  6. Wisnu Wardhana
  7. Hifni Hasan
  8. Harry Warganegara
  9. Zaenal Asikin
  10. Krisna Bayu

== List of general chairman of the Indonesian Olympic committee ==
No	Name	Start position	End position
1	Rita Subowo	2007	31 October 2015
2	Erick Thohir	31 Oktober 2015	9 October 2019
3	Raja Sapta Oktohari	9 October 2019	incumbent

== See also ==
- Indonesia at the Olympics
- Indonesia at the Asian Games
- Indonesia at the SEA Games
- Indonesia at the Islamic Solidarity Games
