= Indonesia at the AFC Asian Cup =

National football delegation

Indonesia has participated in six AFC Asian Cup in their football history. Their first ever appearance was in 1996. Since then, Indonesia had repeatedly qualified for 2000, 2004, 2007, 2023, and 2027 tournaments. Indonesia once hosted the 2007 edition alongside Malaysia, Thailand and Vietnam.

== Record at the AFC Asian Cup ==
AFC Asian Cup record									Qualification record					
Year	Result	Position	Pld	W	D	L	GF	GA	Pld	W	D	L	GF	GA
(Hong Kong) 1956	Withdrew								Withdrew before playing any matches					
(South Korea) 1960	Withdrew								Withdrew before playing any matches					
(Israel) 1964	Withdrew								Withdrew before playing any matches					
(Iran) 1968	Did not qualify								4	1	1	2	10	6
(Thailand) 1972	Did not qualify								5	3	0	2	12	6
(Iran) 1976	Did not qualify								4	1	1	2	3	5
(Kuwait) 1980	Did not qualify								3	0	0	3	3	10
(Singapore) 1984	Did not qualify								5	3	0	2	6	5
(Qatar) 1988	Did not qualify								3	1	1	1	1	4
(Japan) 1992	Did not qualify								3	1	1	1	3	4
(United Arab Emirates) 1996	Group stage	11th	3	0	1	2	4	8	2	1	1	0	7	1
(Lebanon) 2000	Group stage	11th	3	0	1	2	0	7	4	3	1	0	18	5
(China) 2004	Group stage	11th	3	1	0	2	3	9	6	3	1	2	9	13
(Indonesia) (Malaysia) (Thailand) (Vietnam) 2007	Group stage	11th	3	1	0	2	3	4	Qualified as co-hosts					
(Qatar) 2011	Did not qualify								6	0	3	3	3	6
(Australia) 2015	Did not qualify								6	0	1	5	2	8
(United Arab Emirates) 2019	Disqualified due to FIFA suspension								Disqualified					
(Qatar) 2023	Round of 16	16th	4	1	0	3	3	10	13	4	1	8	19	30
(Saudi Arabia) 2027	Qualified								8	5	1	2	20	8
Total	Best: Round of 16	6/19	16	3	2	11	13	38	72	26	13	33	116	111

=== Record by opponent ===
AFC Asian Cup matches (by team)
Opponent	Pld	W	D	L	GF	GA
Australia	1	0	0	1	0	4
Bahrain	2	1	0	1	3	4
China	2	0	0	2	0	9
Iraq	1	0	0	1	1	3
Japan	1	0	0	1	1	3
Kuwait	2	0	2	0	2	2
Qatar	1	1	0	0	2	1
Saudi Arabia	1	0	0	1	1	2
South Korea	3	0	0	3	2	8
United Arab Emirates	1	0	0	1	0	2
Vietnam	1	1	0	0	1	0
Total	16	3	2	11	13	38

== 1996 tournament ==
=== Group A ===
Pos	Team	Pts	Pld	W	D	L	GF	GA	GD
1	United Arab Emirates	7	3	2	1	0	6	3	+3
2	Kuwait	4	3	1	1	1	6	5	+1
3	South Korea	4	3	1	1	1	5	5	0
4	Indonesia	1	3	0	1	2	4	8	−4

4 December 1996
18:45

Indonesia	2–2	Kuwait
Putro 20'; Wabia 40'	Report	Al-Saqer 73'; Haji 84' (pen.)

Sheikh Zayed Stadium, Abu Dhabi
Attendance: 15,000
Referee: Jamal Al Sharif (Syria)

7 December 1996
19:00

South Korea	4–2	Indonesia
Kim Do-Hoon 5'; Hwang Sun-Hong 7', 15'; Ko Jeong-Woon 55'	Report	Wabia 58'; Putro 65'

Sheikh Zayed Stadium, Abu Dhabi
Attendance: 2,000
Referee: Shamsul Maidin (Singapore)

10 December 1996
16:45

United Arab Emirates	2–0	Indonesia
Saeed 15'; Al-Talyani 64'	Report

Sheikh Zayed Stadium, Abu Dhabi
Attendance: 10,000
Referee: Lu Jun (China)

== 2000 tournament ==
=== Group B ===
Pos	Team	Pts	Pld	W	D	L	GF	GA	GD
1	China	5	3	1	2	0	6	2	+4
2	Kuwait	5	3	1	2	0	1	0	+1
3	South Korea	4	3	1	1	1	5	3	+2
4	Indonesia	1	3	0	1	2	0	7	−7

13 October 2000
19:45

Kuwait	0–0	Indonesia
	Report

International Olympic Stadium, Tripoli
Attendance: 2,000
Referee: Tajaddin Fares (Syria)

16 October 2000
17:00

China	4–0	Indonesia
Li Ming 2'; Shen Si 7' (pen.); Yang Chen 10'; Qi Hong 90'	Report

International Olympic Stadium, Tripoli
Attendance: 2,000
Referee: Nabil Ayad (Lebanon)

19 October 2000
19:30

South Korea	3–0	Indonesia
Lee Dong-Gook 30', 76', 90+1'	Report

Sports City Stadium, Beirut
Attendance: 500
Referee: Toru Kamikawa (Japan)

== 2004 tournament ==
=== Group A ===
Pos	Team	Pts	Pld	W	D	L	GF	GA	GD
1	China	7	3	2	1	0	8	2	+6
2	Bahrain	5	3	1	2	0	6	4	+2
3	Indonesia	3	3	1	0	2	3	9	−6
4	Qatar	1	3	0	1	2	2	4	−2

18 July 2004
17:00

Qatar	1–2	Indonesia
M. Mohamed 83'	Report	Sudarsono 26'; Astaman 48'

Workers Stadium, Beijing
Attendance: 5,000
Referee: Masoud Moradi (Iran)

21 July 2004
21:00

Indonesia	0–5	China
	Report	Shao Jiayi 25', 66'; Hao Haidong 40'; Li Ming 51'; Li Yi 80'

Workers Stadium, Beijing
Attendance: 48,000
Referee: Talaat Najm (Lebanon)

25 July 2004
19:00

Bahrain	3–1	Indonesia
Ali 43'; A. Hubail 57'; Yousef 82'	Report	Aiboy 75'

Shandong Sports Center, Jinan
Attendance: 20,000
Referee: Coffi Codjia (Benin)

== 2007 tournament ==
=== Group D ===
Pos	Team	Pld	W	D	L	GF	GA	GD	Pts
1	Saudi Arabia	3	2	1	0	7	2	+5	7
2	South Korea	3	1	1	1	3	3	0	4
3	Indonesia	3	1	0	2	3	4	−1	3
4	Bahrain	3	1	0	2	3	7	−4	3

10 July 2007
17:15 UTC+7

Indonesia	2–1	Bahrain
Sudarsono 14'; Bambang 64'	Report	Mahmood 27'

Gelora Bung Karno Stadium, Jakarta
Attendance: 60,000
Referee: Yuichi Nishimura (Japan)

14 July 2007
19:30 UTC+7

Saudi Arabia	2–1	Indonesia
Y. Al-Qahtani 12'; Al-Harthi 90'	Report	Aiboy 17'

Gelora Bung Karno Stadium, Jakarta
Attendance: 88,000
Referee: Ali Al-Badwawi (United Arab Emirates)

18 July 2007
17:15 UTC+7

Indonesia	0–1	South Korea
	Report	Kim Jung-Woo 34'

Gelora Bung Karno Stadium, Jakarta
Attendance: 88,000
Referee: Mark Shield (Australia)

== 2023 tournament ==
=== Group D ===
Pos	Team	Pld	W	D	L	GF	GA	GD	Pts	Qualification
1	Iraq	3	3	0	0	8	4	+4	9	Advance to knockout stage
2	Japan	3	2	0	1	8	5	+3	6	Advance to knockout stage
3	Indonesia	3	1	0	2	3	6	−3	3	Advance to knockout stage
4	Vietnam	3	0	0	3	4	8	−4	0	

Source: AFC
15 January 2024
17:30

Indonesia	1–3	Iraq
Marselino 37'	Report	M. Ali 17'; Rashid 45+7'; Hussein 75'

Ahmad bin Ali Stadium, Al Rayyan
Attendance: 16,532
Referee: Ilgiz Tantashev (Uzbekistan)

19 January 2024
17:30

Vietnam	0–1	Indonesia
	Report	Asnawi 42' (pen.)

Abdullah bin Khalifa Stadium, Doha
Attendance: 7,253
Referee: Sadullo Gulmurodi (Tajikistan)

24 January 2024
14:30

Japan	3–1	Indonesia
Ueda 6' (pen.), 52'; Hubner 88' (o.g.)	Report	Walsh 90+1'

Al Thumama Stadium, Doha
Attendance: 26,453
Referee: Khamis Al-Marri (Qatar)

Ranking of third-placed teams

Pos	Grp	Team	Pld	W	D	L	GF	GA	GD	Pts	Qualification
1	E	Jordan	3	1	1	1	6	3	+3	4	Advance to knockout stage
2	C	Palestine	3	1	1	1	5	5	0	4	Advance to knockout stage
3	B	Syria	3	1	1	1	1	1	0	4	Advance to knockout stage
4	D	Indonesia	3	1	0	2	3	6	−3	3	Advance to knockout stage
5	F	Oman	3	0	2	1	2	3	−1	2	
6	A	China	3	0	2	1	0	1	−1	2	

Source: AFC

=== Knockout stage ===
==== Round of 16 ====
28 January 2024
14:30

Australia	4–0	Indonesia
Baggott 12' (o.g.); Boyle 45'; Goodwin 89'; Souttar 90+1'	Report

Jassim bin Hamad Stadium, Al Rayyan
Attendance: 7,863
Referee: Mohammed Abdulla Hassan Mohamed (United Arab Emirates)

== Goalscorers ==
Player	Goals	1996	2000	2004	2007	2023
Widodo Cahyono Putro	2	2				
Ronny Wabia	2	2				
Budi Sudarsono	2			1	1	
Ponaryo Astaman	1			1		
Elie Aiboy	2			1	1	
Bambang Pamungkas	1				1	
Marselino Ferdinan	1					1
Asnawi Mangkualam	1					1
Sandy Walsh	1					1
Total	13	4	0	3	3	3

== See also ==
- Indonesia at the FIFA World Cup
