= ASEAN School Games =

Multi-sport event for student athletes

- Abbreviation: ASG
- Frequency: Every year
- Inaugurated: 2009 Suphanburi, Thailand
- Most recent: 2025 Bandar Seri Begawan, Brunei
- Next event: 2026 Jakarta, Indonesia

ASEAN School Games (ASG) (informally known as the Youth SEA Games) is an annual multi-sport event for secondary schools student athletes in the Association of Southeast Asian Nations (ASEAN) and organised under the authority of the ASEAN Schools Sports Council (ASSC). The ASSC is an apolitical regional sports council that promotes sports among member countries. Prior to 2009, the games were played based on satellite, single sports events. This was changed in 2009, where a multi-sport event format was implemented. The 1st ASG planned under the new multi-sport format was hosted by Thailand in 2009, while the 2nd, 3rd and 4th ASG were hosted by Malaysia, Singapore and Indonesia, respectively.

The inception of the multi-sport event format was the outcome of a meeting hosted by Thailand in Chiang Mai in 2008. The planning meeting was jointly led by a ministry official from Singapore (Co-Curricular Activities Branch, Mr Timothy D’Cruz) and Thailand (Department of Physical Education, Dr Patanachart Kridiborworn). Singapore was then at the helm of the ASSC Technical Committee. This milestone planning meeting was responsible for setting the foundation of the guiding principles and direction of the approach that resulted in the birth of the first and subsequent ASGs.

== Objectives ==
- To promote ASEAN Solidarity in our youth through school sports;
- To provide opportunities for school athletes to benchmark their sporting talents in the ASEAN region; and
- To provide opportunities for school athletes to interact and engage in cultural exchange within ASEAN.

== Participating nations ==
Nation / IOC Designation	Debuted	IOC-Code	Notes
Brunei (IOC designation: Brunei Darussalam)	2009	BRU	—
Indonesia	2009	INA	FIFA-code IDN
Singapore	2009	SGP	SIN (1959 — 2016)
Thailand	2009	THA	—
Vietnam (IOC designation: Viet Nam)	2009	VIE	—
Malaysia	2010	MAS	—
Philippines	2010	PHI	ISO PHL
Laos (IOC designation: Lao People's Democratic Republic)	2013	LAO	—
Cambodia	2016	CAM	—
Myanmar	2017	MYA	—

== List of ASEAN School Games ==
Host cities of the ASEAN School Games

Edition	Year	Host city	Host Nation	Start Date	End Date	Nations	Competitors	Sports	Events	Top Placed Team	Ref.
I	2009	Suphan Buri	Thailand	20 July	29 July	5		10	116	Thailand (THA)	
II	2010	Kuala Lumpur	Malaysia	12 July	22 July	7		10	107	Malaysia (MAS)	
III	2011	Singapore	Singapore	30 June	8 July	7		11	118	Thailand (THA)	
IV	2012	Surabaya	Indonesia	28 June	6 July	7		11	141	Thailand (THA)	
V	2013	Hanoi	Vietnam	22 June	30 June	8		9	125	Vietnam (VIE)	
VI	2014	Marikina	Philippines	29 November	7 December	7		11	123	Malaysia (MAS)	
VII	2015	Bandar Seri Begawan	Brunei	21 November	29 November	8		7	80	Indonesia (INA)	
VIII	2016	Chiang Mai	Thailand	21 July	29 July	8		11	123	Thailand (THA)	
IX	2017	Singapore	Singapore	13 July	21 July	10		10	120	Thailand (THA)	
X	2018	Selangor	Malaysia	19 July	27 July	10		12	123	Malaysia (MAS)	
XI	2019	Semarang	Indonesia	17 July	25 July	10		9	123	Indonesia (INA)	
XII	2022	Dumaguete	Philippines	Cancelled due to COVID-19 pandemic							
XIII	2024	Da Nang	Vietnam	31 May	7 June	10		6	107	Vietnam (VIE)	
XIV	2025	Bandar Seri Begawan	Brunei	20 November	28 November	10		8	106	Indonesia (INA)	
XV	2026	Jakarta	Indonesia	Future event							

== Sports ==
Officially, there were a total of 22 sports, which were held in the ASEAN School Games.

Sport	Years
Athletics	All
Badminton	All
Basketball	2009–2014, since 2016
Bowling	2017 only
Field hockey	2010–2011
Futsal	2016 only
Golf	2009–2016
Gymnastics	2009–2014, 2016–2018
Netball	2010–2011, 2015, 2018
Pencak silat	2012–2013, 2015, 2019, 2024

Sport	Years
Rugby sevens	2012 only
Sepak takraw	2009–2019
Squash	2018 only
Swimming	All
Table tennis	2009, 2011–2014, 2016–2019
Tennis	2009, 2012–2014, 2016–2019
Triathlon	2011 only
Volleyball	2009–2014, 2016–2019
Vovinam	2024 only
Water polo	2011 only
Water skiing	2011 only
Wushu	2014 only

== All-time medal count ==
ASEAN School Games 2009-2025
Rank	Nation	Gold	Silver	Bronze	Total
1	Thailand (THA)	418	379	436	1,233
2	Indonesia (INA)	332	372	328	1,032
3	Malaysia (MAS)	292	309	346	947
4	Vietnam (VIE)	258	186	162	606
5	Singapore (SIN)	153	183	276	612
6	Philippines (PHI)	54	61	146	261
7	Myanmar (MYA)	6	4	13	23
8	Brunei (BRU)	5	18	34	57
9	Cambodia (CAM)	2	2	8	12
10	Laos (LAO)	0	7	32	39
Totals (10 entries)		1,520	1,521	1,781	4,822

== ASEAN School Games editions ==
=== 2009 ASEAN School Games ===
 * Host nation (Thailand)

Rank	NOC	Gold	Silver	Bronze	Total
1	Thailand (THA)*	72	42	40	154
2	Vietnam (VIE)	18	16	23	57
3	Indonesia (INA)	13	33	29	75
4	Singapore (SIN)	13	25	35	73
5	Brunei (BRU)	0	0	2	2
Totals (5 entries)		116	116	129	361

=== 2010 ASEAN School Games ===
 * Host nation (Malaysia)

Rank	NOC	Gold	Silver	Bronze	Total
1	Malaysia (MAS)*	46	37	24	107
2	Thailand (THA)	32	37	33	102
3	Indonesia (INA)	14	15	19	48
4	Vietnam (VIE)	11	8	16	35
5	Singapore (SIN)	4	12	20	36
6	Philippines (PHI)	0	2	3	5
7	Brunei (BRU)	0	0	1	1
Totals (7 entries)		107	111	116	334

=== 2011 ASEAN School Games ===
 * Host nation (Singapore)

Rank	NOC	Gold	Silver	Bronze	Total
1	Thailand (THA)	29	26	42	97
2	Singapore (SIN)*	26	22	31	79
3	Malaysia (MAS)	21	34	32	87
4	Indonesia (INA)	21	20	26	67
5	Vietnam (VIE)	20	16	11	47
6	Philippines (PHI)	1	0	1	2
7	Brunei (BRU)	0	0	0	0
Totals (7 entries)		118	118	143	379

Source=

=== 2012 ASEAN School Games ===
 * Host nation (Indonesia)

Rank	NOC	Gold	Silver	Bronze	Total
1	Thailand (THA)	38	28	47	113
2	Indonesia (INA)*	33	33	27	93
3	Malaysia (MAS)	29	36	35	100
4	Vietnam (VIE)	27	17	16	60
5	Singapore (SIN)	14	16	18	48
6	Brunei (BRU)	0	8	6	14
7	Philippines (PHI)	0	2	1	3
Totals (7 entries)		141	140	150	431

Source=

=== 2013 ASEAN School Games ===
 * Host nation (Vietnam)

Rank	NOC	Gold	Silver	Bronze	Total
1	Vietnam (VIE)*	50	27	23	100
2	Malaysia (MAS)	25	30	30	85
3	Thailand (THA)	24	31	32	87
4	Indonesia (INA)	18	27	27	72
5	Singapore (SIN)	8	5	15	28
6	Laos (LAO)	0	3	5	8
7	Brunei (BRU)	0	2	8	10
8	Philippines (PHI)	0	0	3	3
Totals (8 entries)		125	125	143	393

=== 2014 ASEAN School Games ===
 * Host nation (Philippines)

Rank	NOC	Gold	Silver	Bronze	Total
1	Malaysia (MAS)	41	34	30	105
2	Thailand (THA)	35	29	36	100
3	Indonesia (INA)	15	31	30	76
4	Philippines (PHI)*	11	14	22	47
5	Vietnam (VIE)	11	6	6	23
6	Singapore (SIN)	10	10	19	39
7	Brunei (BRU)	0	1	3	4
Totals (7 entries)		123	125	146	394

Source=

=== 2015 ASEAN School Games ===
 * Host nation (Brunei)

Rank	NOC	Gold	Silver	Bronze	Total
1	Indonesia (INA)	25	24	10	59
2	Malaysia (MAS)	20	14	22	56
3	Thailand (THA)	13	31	26	70
4	Vietnam (VIE)	12	2	10	24
5	Singapore (SIN)	6	4	10	20
6	Philippines (PHI)	3	3	11	17
7	Brunei (BRU)*	1	1	3	5
8	Laos (LAO)	0	1	2	3
Totals (8 entries)		80	80	94	254

=== 2016 ASEAN School Games ===
 * Host nation (Thailand)

Rank	NOC	Gold	Silver	Bronze	Total
1	Thailand (THA)*	56	36	33	125
2	Indonesia (INA)	30	34	35	99
3	Vietnam (VIE)	19	20	15	54
4	Singapore (SIN)	13	14	30	57
5	Malaysia (MAS)	6	16	22	44
6	Laos (LAO)	0	1	7	8
7	Cambodia (CAM)	0	0	1	1
8	Brunei (BRU)	0	0	0	0
Totals (8 entries)		124	121	143	388

=== 2017 ASEAN School Games ===
 * Host nation (Singapore)

Rank	NOC	Gold	Silver	Bronze	Total
1	Thailand (THA)	29	26	32	87
2	Indonesia (INA)	25	33	29	87
3	Singapore (SIN)*	24	27	27	78
4	Malaysia (MAS)	22	16	34	72
5	Vietnam (VIE)	20	21	10	51
6	Philippines (PHI)	13	8	21	42
7	Myanmar (MYA)	0	0	4	4
8	Laos (LAO)	0	0	2	2
9	Brunei (BRU)	0	0	0	0
9	Cambodia (CAM)	0	0	0	0
Totals (10 entries)		133	131	159	423

=== 2018 ASEAN School Games ===
 * Host nation (Malaysia)

Rank	NOC	Gold	Silver	Bronze	Total
1	Malaysia (MAS)*	37	34	32	103
2	Indonesia (INA)	31	36	30	97
3	Thailand (THA)	19	21	31	71
4	Singapore (SGP)	13	16	22	51
5	Vietnam (VIE)	13	8	6	27
6	Philippines (PHI)	9	7	20	36
7	Myanmar (MYA)	1	2	2	5
8	Laos (LAO)	0	0	3	3
9	Brunei (BRU)	0	0	0	0
9	Cambodia (CAM)	0	0	0	0
Totals (10 entries)		123	124	146	393

=== 2019 ASEAN School Games ===
 * Host nation (Indonesia)

Rank	NOC	Gold	Silver	Bronze	Total
1	Indonesia (INA)*	43	34	25	102
2	Thailand (THA)	33	31	35	99
3	Malaysia (MAS)	18	25	34	77
4	Singapore (SGP)	10	11	17	38
5	Vietnam (VIE)	8	8	5	21
6	Philippines (PHI)	4	7	22	33
7	Myanmar (MYA)	1	0	1	2
8	Laos (LAO)	0	1	7	8
9	Brunei (BRU)	0	1	0	1
10	Cambodia (CAM)	0	0	0	0
Totals (10 entries)		117	118	146	381

Source=

=== 2024 ASEAN School Games ===
* Host nation (Vietnam)

Rank	NOC	Gold	Silver	Bronze	Total
1	Vietnam (VIE)*	44	31	17	92
2	Indonesia (INA)	22	22	20	64
3	Thailand (THA)	18	17	23	58
4	Malaysia (MAS)	13	17	24	54
5	Singapore (SGP)	4	8	20	32
6	Philippines (PHI)	2	8	20	30
7	Cambodia (CAM)	2	1	6	9
8	Myanmar (MYA)	2	1	4	7
9	Laos (LAO)	0	1	3	4
10	Brunei (BRU)	0	1	1	2
Totals (10 entries)		107	107	138	352

Source=

=== 2025 ASEAN School Games ===
* Host nation (Brunei)

Rank	NOC	Gold	Silver	Bronze	Total
1	Indonesia (INA)	42	30	21	93
2	Thailand (THA)	20	24	26	70
3	Malaysia (MAS)	14	16	27	57
4	Philippines (PHI)	11	10	22	43
5	Singapore (SGP)	8	13	12	33
6	Vietnam (VIE)	5	6	4	15
7	Brunei (BRU)*	4	4	10	18
8	Myanmar (MYA)	2	1	2	5
9	Cambodia (CAM)	0	1	1	2
10	Laos (LAO)	0	0	3	3
Totals (10 entries)		106	105	128	339

Source=
