= Indonesia at the Deaflympics =

- IPC code: INA
- NPC: Indonesian Sports Association of the Deaf
- Medals: Gold 0 Silver 1 Bronze 3 Total 4

Summer appearances
- 2009; 2013; 2017; 2021

Indonesia has been regularly competing at the Deaflympics from 2009, except 2021, the Indonesian Association of the Deaf Athletes was established in 2009. In that year, Indonesia began participating in the Deaflympic event, organized by the Comite International des Sports des Sourds (CISS).

Indonesia has not yet competed at the Winter Deaflympics.

== Medal tallies ==
=== Summer Deaflympics ===
Year	Gold	Silver	Bronze	Total
2009	0	0	0	0
2013	0	0	2	2
2017	0	1	1	2

=== Medalists ===
Medal	Name	Games	Sport	Event
Bronze	Aditya Hermawan; Edi Susanto	2013 Sofia	Badminton	Men's doubles
Bronze	Astama Priyaka Irfan	2013 Sofia	Taekwondo	Men's individual poomsae
Silver	Ilham Achmad Turmudzi	2017 Samsun	Swimming	Men's 200 m breaststroke
Bronze	Ilham Achmad Turmudzi	2017 Samsun	Swimming	Men's 100 m breaststroke

== See also ==
- Indonesia at the Olympics
- Indonesia at the Paralympics
