= List of South East Asian Table Tennis Championships medalists =

== Winners of SEATTA Championships (1998 - Now) ==
Year	Singles		Doubles			Team	
Year	Men's	Women's	Men's	Women's	Mixed	Men's	Women's
1998; Bangkok，Thailand		(Singapore) Li Jiawei			(Singapore) (Singapore) Li Jiawei		Singapore
2000; Kuala Lumpur, Malaysia		(Singapore) Li Jiawei		(Singapore) Li Jiawei (Singapore)	(Singapore) (Singapore) Li Jiawei		Singapore
2002; Tangerang, Indonesia		(Singapore) Zhang Xueling					Singapore
2004; Ho Chi Minh City, Vietnam							Singapore
2006; Singapore, Singapore		(Singapore) Zhang Xueling		(Singapore) Tan Paey Fern (Singapore) Zhang Xueling	(Singapore) Yang Zi (Singapore) Zhang Xueling		Singapore
2008; Jakarta, Indonesia	(Philippines) Richard Gonzales			(Malaysia) Beh Lee Wei (Malaysia) Ng Sock Khim			
2010; Makati, Philippines		(Vietnam)		(Malaysia) Beh Lee Wei (Malaysia) Ng Sock Khim		Vietnam	
2012; Vientiane, Laos	(Singapore) Li Hu	(Singapore) Yu Mengyu	(Singapore) Li Hu (Singapore) Chew Zhe Yu Clarence	(Thailand) Nanthana Komwong (Thailand) Anisara Muangsuk	(Singapore) Li Hu (Singapore) Yu Mengyu	Singapore	Thailand
2014; Phnom Penh，Cambodia	(Cambodia) Ly Song-Hong	(Singapore) Lin Ye	(Singapore) Chew Zhe Yu Clarence (Singapore) Ethan Poh Shao Feng	(Singapore) Lin Ye (Singapore) Goi Rui Xuan	(Singapore) Chew Zhe Yu Clarence (Singapore) Lin Ye	Cambodia	Singapore
2016; Makassar, Indonesia	(Vietnam) Nguyen Anh Tu	(Singapore) Lin Ye	(Singapore) Chew Zhe Yu Clarence (Singapore) Ethan Poh Shao Feng	(Singapore) Lin Ye (Singapore) Goi Rui Xuan	(Singapore) Chew Zhe Yu Clarence (Singapore) Lin Ye	Vietnam	Vietnam
2018; Bali, Indonesia	(Singapore) Clarence Chew Zhe Yu	(Singapore) Goi Rui Xuan	(Singapore) Koen Pang Yew En (Singapore) Ethan Poh Shao Feng	(Malaysia) Karen Lyne Anak Dick (Malaysia) Ho Ying	(Singapore) Koen Pang Yew En (Singapore) Goi Rui Xuan	Singapore	Malaysia

== Results of SEATTA Events ==
The tables below are South East Asian Table Tennis Champions lists of events (Men's and Women's Singles, Men's, Women's, and Mixed Doubles, and Men's and Women's Team).

=== Men's singles ===
Year	Host City	Gold	Silver	Bronze
1998	Bangkok		(Malaysia) Eng Tian Syh	
2000	Kuala Lumpur			
2002	Tangerang			
2004	Ho Chi Minh City			
2006	Singapore			
2008	Jakarta	(Philippines) Richard Gonzales		(Malaysia) Muhd Shakirin Ibrahim
2010	Makati			(Thailand)
2010	Makati			(Malaysia) Muhd Shakirin Ibrahim
2012	Vientiane	(Singapore) Li Hu	(Vietnam) Dinh Quang Linh	(Vietnam) Tran Tuan Quynh
2012	Vientiane	(Singapore) Li Hu	(Vietnam) Dinh Quang Linh	(Vietnam) Dao Duy Hoang
2014	Phnom Penh	(Cambodia) Ly Song-Hong	(Singapore) Chen Feng	
2016	Makassar	(Vietnam) Nguyen Anh Tu	(Singapore) Ethan Poh Shao Feng	(Vietnam) Doan Ba Thuan Anh
2016	Makassar	(Vietnam) Nguyen Anh Tu	(Singapore) Ethan Poh Shao Feng	(Vietnam) Dinh Quang Linh
2018	Bali	(Singapore) Clarence Chew Zhe Yu	(Singapore) Koen Pang Yew En	(Singapore) Ethan Poh Shao Feng
2018	Bali	(Singapore) Clarence Chew Zhe Yu	(Singapore) Koen Pang Yew En	(Singapore) Lucas Tan

=== Women's singles ===
Year	Host City	Gold	Silver	Bronze
1998	Bangkok	(Singapore) Li Jiawei		
2000	Kuala Lumpur	(Singapore) Li Jiawei		
2002	Tangerang	(Singapore) Zhang Xueling		
2004	Ho Chi Minh City			
2006	Singapore	(Singapore) Zhang Xueling	(Singapore) Tan Paey Fern	
2008	Jakarta		(Malaysia) Beh Lee Wei	
2010	Makati	(Vietnam)	(Malaysia) Beh Lee Wei	(Thailand)
2012	Vientiane	(Singapore) Yu Mengyu	(Thailand) Nanthana Komwong	(Vietnam) Mai Hoang My Trang
2012	Vientiane	(Singapore) Yu Mengyu	(Thailand) Nanthana Komwong	(Vietnam) Nguyen Thi Viet Linh
2014	Phnom Penh	(Singapore) Lin Ye	(Singapore) Isabelle Siyun Li	(Singapore) Zhou Yihan
2016	Makassar	(Singapore) Lin Ye	(Vietnam) Mai Hoang My Trang	(Singapore) Zhang Wanling
2016	Makassar	(Singapore) Lin Ye	(Vietnam) Mai Hoang My Trang	(Vietnam) Nguyen Thi Viet Linh
2018	Bali	(Singapore) Goi Rui Xuan	(Singapore) Wong Xin Ru	(Singapore) Pearlyn Koh Kai Xin
2018	Bali	(Singapore) Goi Rui Xuan	(Singapore) Wong Xin Ru	(Singapore) Eunice Lim Zoe

=== Men's doubles ===
Year	Host City	Gold	Silver	Bronze
1998	Bangkok			
2000	Kuala Lumpur			
2002	Tangerang			
2004	Ho Chi Minh City			
2006	Singapore			
2008	Jakarta			(Philippines) Richard Gonzales (Philippines) Henberd Ortalla
2008	Jakarta			(Malaysia) Muhd Shakirin Ibrahim (Malaysia) Chai Kian Beng
2010	Makati			(Philippines) Richard Gonzales (Philippines)
2010	Makati			(Singapore) Pang Xuejie (Singapore) Ma Liang
2012	Vientiane	(Singapore) Li Hu (Singapore) Chew Zhe Yu Clarence	(Singapore) Ma Liang (Singapore) Pang Xuejie	(Vietnam) Tran Tuan Quynh (Vietnam) Dinh Quang Ling
2012	Vientiane	(Singapore) Li Hu (Singapore) Chew Zhe Yu Clarence	(Singapore) Ma Liang (Singapore) Pang Xuejie	(Indonesia) Yon Mardiyono (Indonesia) Gilang Maulana
2014	Phnom Penh	(Singapore) Chew Zhe Yu Clarence (Singapore) Chen Feng		(Cambodia) Ly Song-Hong (Cambodia) Su Kim-Sour
2014	Phnom Penh	(Singapore) Chew Zhe Yu Clarence (Singapore) Chen Feng		(Singapore) Loy Mean Hean Darren (Singapore) Ethan Poh Shao Feng
2016	Makassar	(Singapore) Chew Zhe Yu Clarence (Singapore) Ethan Poh Shao Feng	(Vietnam) Dinh Quang Linh (Vietnam) Nguyen Anh Tu	(Indonesia) Gilang Maulana (Indonesia) Ficky Supit Santoso
2016	Makassar	(Singapore) Chew Zhe Yu Clarence (Singapore) Ethan Poh Shao Feng	(Vietnam) Dinh Quang Linh (Vietnam) Nguyen Anh Tu	(Singapore) Tay Ming Han Maxxe (Singapore) Lim Zheng Jie Edric
2018	Budapest	(Singapore) Koen Pang Yew En (Singapore) Ethan Poh Shao Feng	(Malaysia) Leong Chee Feng (Malaysia) Wong Qi Shen	(Indonesia) Deepash Bhagwani (Indonesia) Rahmat Pakaya
2018	Budapest	(Singapore) Koen Pang Yew En (Singapore) Ethan Poh Shao Feng	(Malaysia) Leong Chee Feng (Malaysia) Wong Qi Shen	(Singapore) Lucas Tan (Singapore) Gerald Yu Zong Jun

=== Women's doubles ===
Year	Host city	Gold	Silver	Bronze
1998	Bangkok			
2000	Kuala Lumpur	(Singapore) Li Jiawei (Singapore)	(Malaysia) Beh Lee Wei (Malaysia)	
2002	Tangerang			(Malaysia) Beh Lee Wei (Malaysia) Beh Lee Fong
2004	Ho Chi Minh City		(Singapore) Tan Paey Fern (Singapore) Zhang Xueling	(Malaysia) Beh Lee Wei (Malaysia) Beh Lee Fong
2006	Singapore	(Singapore) Tan Paey Fern (Singapore) Zhang Xueling		(Malaysia) Ng Sock Khim (Malaysia) Chiu Soo Jiin
2008	Jakarta	(Malaysia) Beh Lee Wei (Malaysia) Ng Sock Khim		
2010	Makati	(Malaysia) Beh Lee Wei (Malaysia) Ng Sock Khim	(Indonesia) (Indonesia)	
2012	Vientiane	(Thailand) Nanthana Komwong (Thailand) Anisara Muangsuk	(Indonesia) Noor Azizah (Indonesia) Fauziah Yulianti	(Singapore) Yu Mengyu (Singapore) Li Isabelle Siyun
2012	Vientiane	(Thailand) Nanthana Komwong (Thailand) Anisara Muangsuk	(Indonesia) Noor Azizah (Indonesia) Fauziah Yulianti	(Singapore) Sim Kai Xin Zena (Singapore) Yee Herng Hwee
2014	Phnom Penh	(Singapore) Lin Ye (Singapore) Zhou Yihan		
2016	Makassar	(Singapore) Lin Ye (Singapore) Goi Rui Xuan	(Indonesia) Lilis Indriani (Indonesia) Gustin Dwijayanti	(Indonesia) Hawwa Kharisma Nur (Indonesia) Azhari Hani Tri
2016	Makassar	(Singapore) Lin Ye (Singapore) Goi Rui Xuan	(Indonesia) Lilis Indriani (Indonesia) Gustin Dwijayanti	(Singapore) Nguyen Thi Viet Linh (Singapore) Phan Hoang Tuong Giang
2018	Bali	(Malaysia) Karen Lyne Anak Dick (Malaysia) Ho Ying	(Singapore) Pearlyn Koh Kai Xin (Singapore) Tan En Hui	(Philippines) Rose Jean Fadol (Philippines) Sendrina Andrea Balatbat
2018	Bali	(Malaysia) Karen Lyne Anak Dick (Malaysia) Ho Ying	(Singapore) Pearlyn Koh Kai Xin (Singapore) Tan En Hui	(Singapore) Goi Rui Xuan (Singapore) Wong Xin Ru

=== Mixed doubles ===
Year	Host city	Gold	Silver	Bronze
1998	Bangkok	(Singapore) (Singapore) Li Jiawei		
2000	Kuala Lumpur	(Singapore) (Singapore) Li Jiawei		
2002	Tangerang		(Singapore) (Singapore) Zhang Xueling	
2004	Ho Chi Minh City			(Malaysia) Muhd Shakirin Ibrahim (Malaysia) Beh Lee Wei
2006	Singapore	(Singapore) Yang Zi (Singapore) Zhang Xueling	(Singapore) (Singapore) Tan Paey Fern	
2008	Jakarta			(Malaysia) Muhd Shakirin Ibrahim (Malaysia) Beh Lee Wei
2010	Makati			(Malaysia) Chai Kian Beng (Malaysia) Ng Sock Khim
2012	Vientiane	(Singapore) Li Hu (Singapore) Yu Mengyu	(Vietnam) Dinh Quang Linh (Vietnam) Mai Hoang My Trang	(Indonesia) Gilang Maulana (Indonesia) Noor Azizah
2012	Vientiane	(Singapore) Li Hu (Singapore) Yu Mengyu	(Vietnam) Dinh Quang Linh (Vietnam) Mai Hoang My Trang	(Indonesia) Ficky Supit Santoso (Indonesia) Fauziah Yulianti
2014	Phnom Penh	(Singapore) Chew Zhe Yu Clarence (Singapore) Zhou Yihan		
2016	Makassar	(Singapore) Chew Zhe Yu Clarence (Singapore) Lin Ye	(Indonesia) Ficky Supit Santoso (Indonesia) Gustin Dwijayanti	(Indonesia) Gilang Maulana (Indonesia) Lilis Indriani
2016	Makassar	(Singapore) Chew Zhe Yu Clarence (Singapore) Lin Ye	(Indonesia) Ficky Supit Santoso (Indonesia) Gustin Dwijayanti	(Malaysia) Haiqal Muhamad Ashraf (Malaysia) Lee Rou You
2018	Bali	(Singapore) Koen Pang Yew En (Singapore) Goi Rui Xuan	(Singapore) Ethan Poh Shao Feng (Singapore) Wong Xin Ru	(Philippines) Ryan Jacolo (Philippines) Emy Rose Dael
2018	Bali	(Singapore) Koen Pang Yew En (Singapore) Goi Rui Xuan	(Singapore) Ethan Poh Shao Feng (Singapore) Wong Xin Ru	(Philippines) Elijah Chars Johan Yamson (Philippines) Jamaica Dianne Sy

=== Men's team ===
Year	Host City	Gold	Silver	Bronze
1998	Bangkok		Malaysia	
2000	Kuala Lumpur			Malaysia
2002	Tangerang			
2004	Ho Chi Minh City			Malaysia
2006	Singapore			Malaysia
2008	Jakarta			Philippines
2010	Makati	Vietnam	Singapore	Malaysia
2012	Vientiane	Singapore	Indonesia	Thailand
2012	Vientiane	Singapore	Indonesia	Vietnam
2014	Phnom Penh	Cambodia	Singapore	
2016	Makassar	Vietnam	Indonesia	Malaysia
2016	Makassar	Vietnam	Indonesia	Singapore
2018	Bali	Singapore	Malaysia	Indonesia
2018	Bali	Singapore	Malaysia	Thailand

=== Women's team ===
Year	Host City	Gold	Silver	Bronze
1998	Bangkok	Singapore		Malaysia
2000	Kuala Lumpur	Singapore	Malaysia	
2002	Tangerang	Singapore		Malaysia
2004	Ho Chi Minh City	Singapore	Malaysia	
2006	Singapore	Singapore		
2008	Jakarta		Malaysia	Philippines
2010	Makati		Malaysia	Singapore
2012	Vientiane	Thailand	Singapore	Malaysia
2012	Vientiane	Thailand	Singapore	Vietnam
2014	Phnom Penh	Singapore		
2016	Makassar	Vietnam	Singapore	Indonesia
2016	Makassar	Vietnam	Singapore	Malaysia
2018	Bali	Malaysia	Thailand	Philippines
2018	Bali	Malaysia	Thailand	Singapore

== See also ==
- Asian Table Tennis Union
- Asian Table Tennis Championships
- South East Asian Table Tennis Championships
