= Sports in Indonesia =

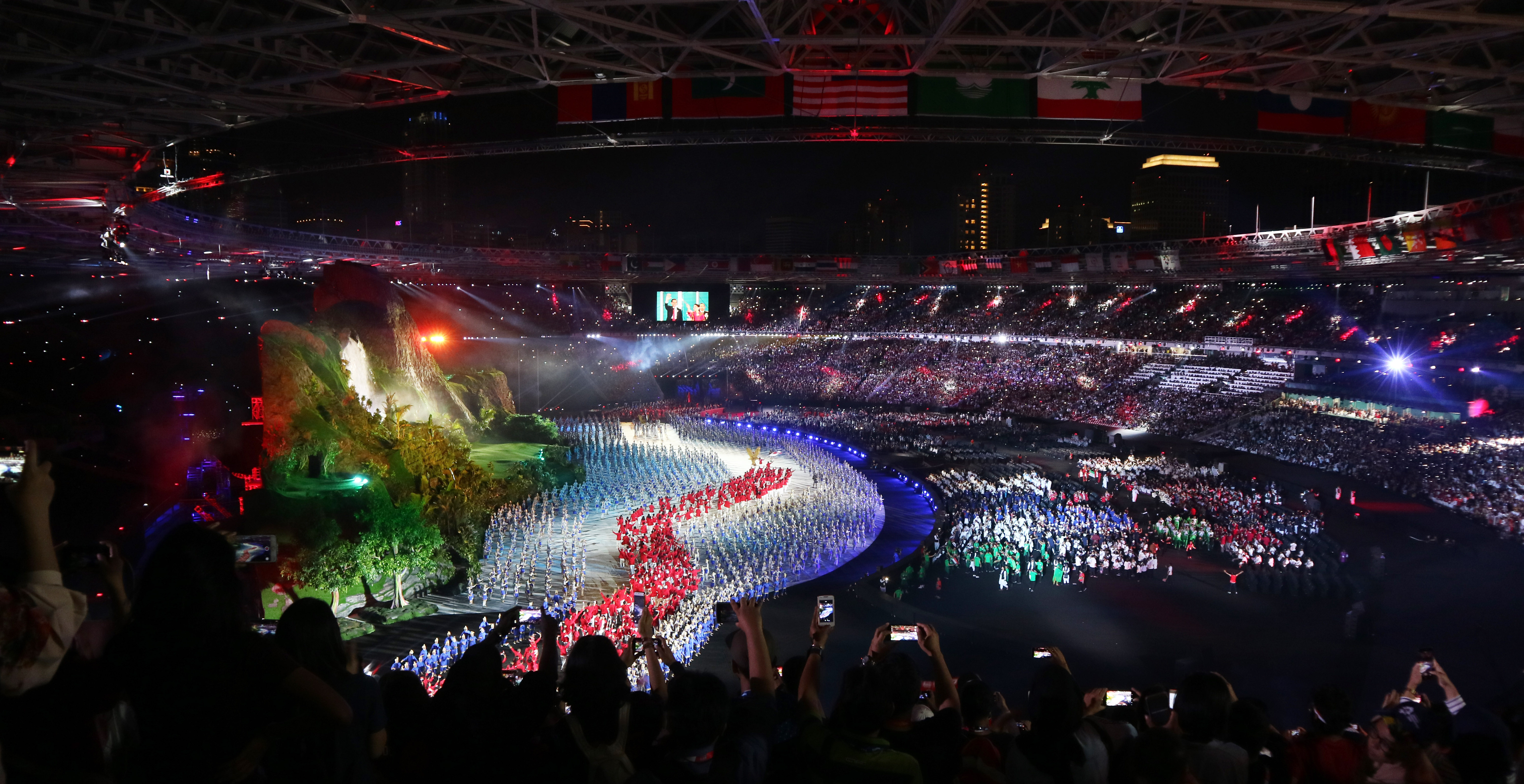
2018 Asian Games opening ceremony in Jakarta.

Sports in Indonesia are popular from both the participation and spectating aspect. Some popular sports in Indonesia are football, futsal, volleyball, basketball, badminton, and the native Indonesian martial art pencak silat as well as foreign martial arts such the Japanese Karate and Korean Taekwondo, other combat sports such as Kickboxing and Muay Thai have also gained significance in the country in recent years. Badminton is arguably Indonesia's most successful sport. Indonesia has won gold medals in badminton in every Olympic Games since the sport was first introduced to the Olympics in 1992, with the exception of two, at the 2012 and 2024 Summer Olympics, although in latter Games, Indonesia clinched a gold medal for the first time in sport climbing and weightlifting, respectively. Indonesia became the first grand winner in Badminton Olympics back then 1992. Indonesia regularly participates in the Thomas Cup, Uber Cup, and Sudirman Cup badminton championships, then became the first nation in history to complete those three titles. Indonesia also regularly participates in regional multi-events sport, such as the Southeast Asian Games, Asian Games, and Olympic Games. Indonesia is one of the major sport powerhouses in the Southeast Asian region, winning the Southeast Asian Games 10 times since 1977.

Sporting events in Indonesia are organised by the Indonesian National Sport Committee (Komite Olahraga Nasional Indonesia or KONI). The organisation, along with the Indonesian government, have set the National Sports Day on 9 September. Indonesia hosts the National Sports Week (Pekan Olahraga Nasional) multi-sport event every four years. Athletes from all provinces of Indonesia participate in this event, with hosting tally are distributed among Indonesian provinces.

== History ==
=== Ancient era ===
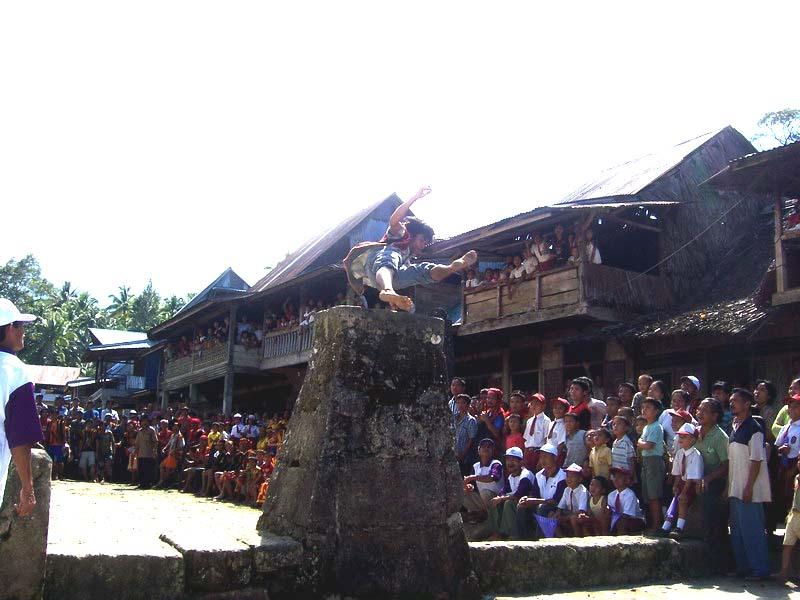
Nias' "leaping the stones" ritual.

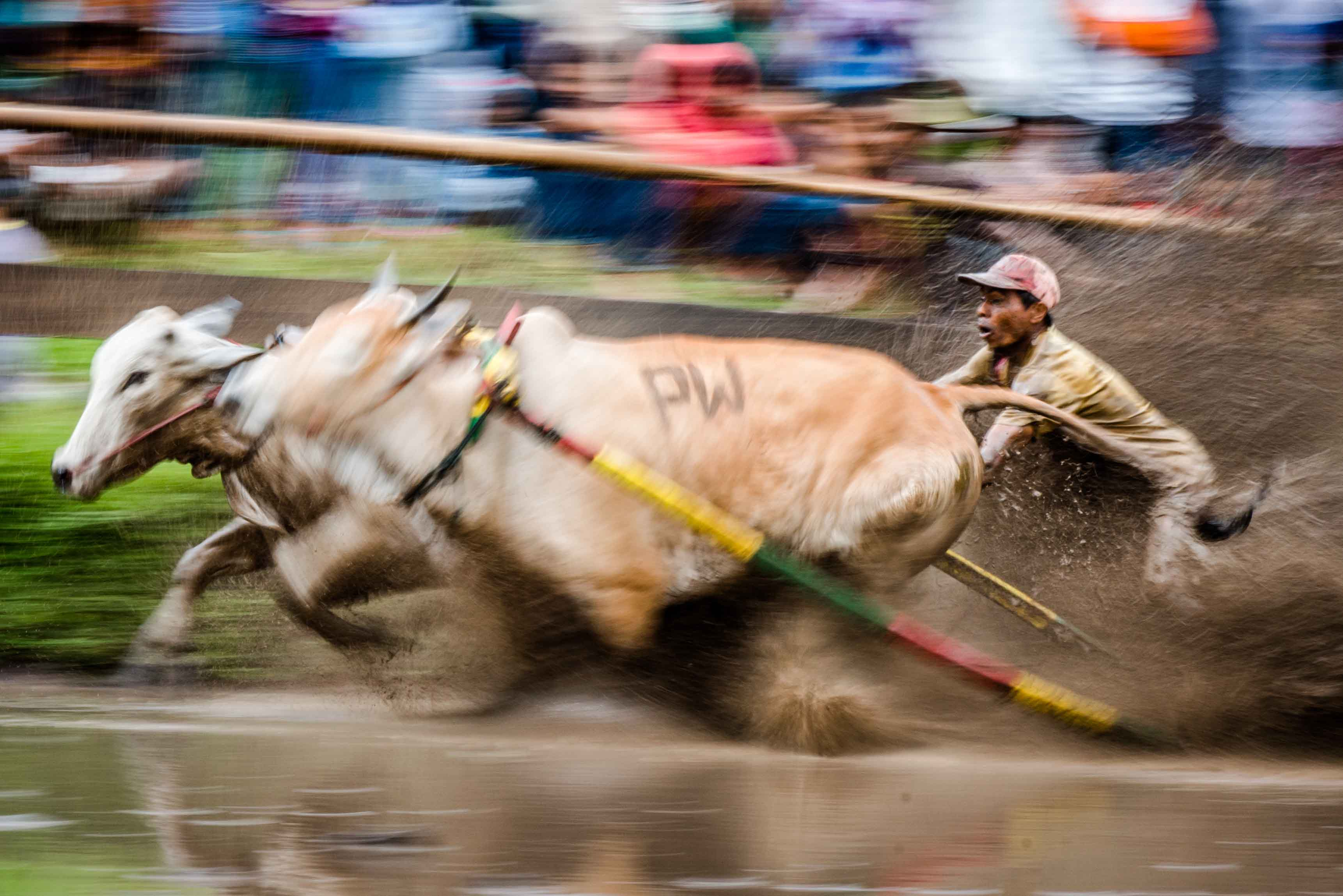
Pacu jawi, traditional bull race of Tanah Datar, West Sumatra.

In traditional Indonesian culture, there is no actual concept for physical exercise as the counterpart of modern sport. Native Indonesians usually linked the physical activities to tribal practices; mainly for ritual, art, physical fitness and martial purposes. The war dances and ritual combat among Indonesian tribes are the earliest example of ritualised physical exercise in Indonesia. Some of native Indonesian rituals are resembling sport, such as lompat batu (leaping the stone) tradition among Nias male youth as part of coming of age ritual, that resembles hurdling and long jump in athletics. Also Madurese karapan sapi and Minang pacu jawi (bull racing) that are similar to chariot race. Dragon boat, canoe and kayak race are virtually everyday activities among Indonesians that lives on the bank of major rivers or on distant islands.

In the 9th century the images of archery, described as princely court activities among nobility in ancient Java, can be found on bas-reliefs of Javanese candis. Archery is suggested as one of Indonesia's classical sport, and one of its famous rendering came from Prambanan temple as part of Ramayana story and later rendered as one of the icon of the Jakarta's 1962 Asian Games, also as the symbol of Gelora Bung Karno Stadium.

Pencak silat is the example of Indonesian native martial art that turned into competitive combat sport. Several Indonesian dances demonstrated repetitive movements that similar to physical exercise. Indonesian traditional social dances such as poco-poco dance from North Sulawesi and sajojo from Papua are adopted as senam kesegaran jasmani (musical calisthenics) today popular across Indonesia.

=== Modern era ===
The modern concept of sport was introduced during the colonial Dutch East Indies period. During these times football and badminton had reached Indonesia and became popular sports among Indonesian people ever since. After Indonesian independence, the National Sports Committee of Indonesia was established in 1946 to unite the various satellite sports associations that were created within the regencies. Sports facilities such as Ikada Stadium (1951—1962) were constructed throughout the country. During Sukarno's reign, there was a desire to use sport as the means of uniting the Indonesian people, establishing national pride as well as promoting sports in Indonesia. As a result, the Gelora Bung Karno Stadium and its surrounding sporting complex facilities were constructed in 1962 to host the fourth Asian Games held in Jakarta. Today on the international stage, Indonesia is successful in badminton and has also been one of the major multi-event sports powerhouse of Southeast Asia.

== Sports known in Indonesia ==
Many sports were imported, some were developed from native Indonesian traditional sports and became popular in Indonesia.

=== Badminton ===
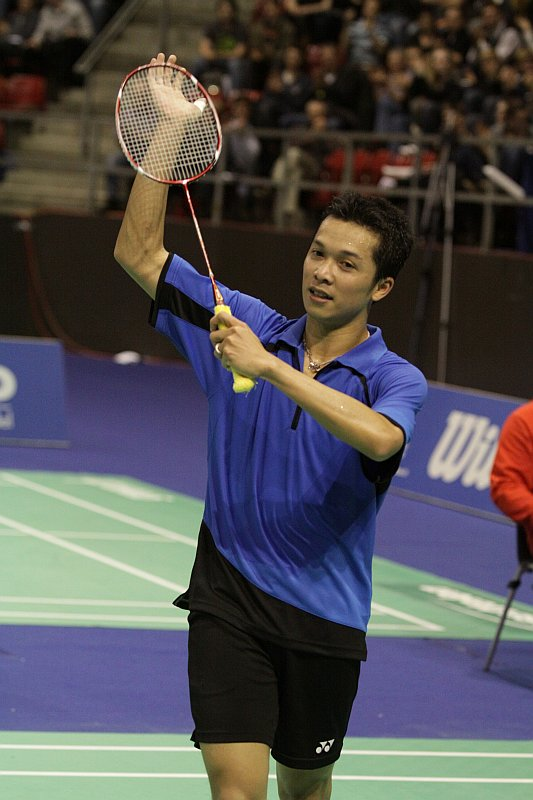
Taufik Hidayat, 2004 Olympic gold medalist in badminton men's singles.

Badminton is Indonesia's most successful sport, described by The New York Times as "part of the national identity". Indonesia has won gold medal in badminton in every Olympic Games since the sport was first introduced to the Olympics in 1992, except for two, in 2012 and 2024. In 1992, it came from Alan Budikusuma in men's singles, and Susi Susanti in women's singles. In 1996, Ricky Subagja and Rexy Mainaky got the gold medal in men's doubles. In 2000, Candra Wijaya and Tony Gunawan won the gold medal in men's doubles. In 2004, Taufik Hidayat won a gold medal in men's singles. In 2008, Indonesia won a gold medal through men's doubles, Markis Kido and Hendra Setiawan. In 2016, Indonesia won a gold medal through mixed doubles, Liliyana Natsir and Tontowi Ahmad. In 2020, Indonesia won a gold medal through women’s doubles, Greysia Polii and Apriyani Rahayu.

Indonesian badminton athletes have played in various international badminton tournaments in Indonesia, China, Korea, Denmark, Malaysia, India, Japan, England and many other tournaments, including Summer Olympics ever since the sport was introduced as a demonstration sport in the 1972 Summer Olympics and its official introduction in the 1992 Summer Olympics. Rudy Hartono is an Indonesian legendary badminton player, who has succeeded to win All England titles seven times in a row.

Out of all participating nations, Indonesia won the most titles in the Thomas Cup (World Men’s Team Badminton Championships), winning 14 titles in 29 appearances. In addition to that, Indonesia has won the Uber Cup (World Women’s Team Badminton Championships) 3 times and Sudirman Cup (World Mixed Team Badminton Championships) once. Indonesia also held its own international badminton tournament, the most prestigious is Indonesia Open that has been held annually since 1982 and Indonesia Masters which has been held since 2010.

=== Football ===
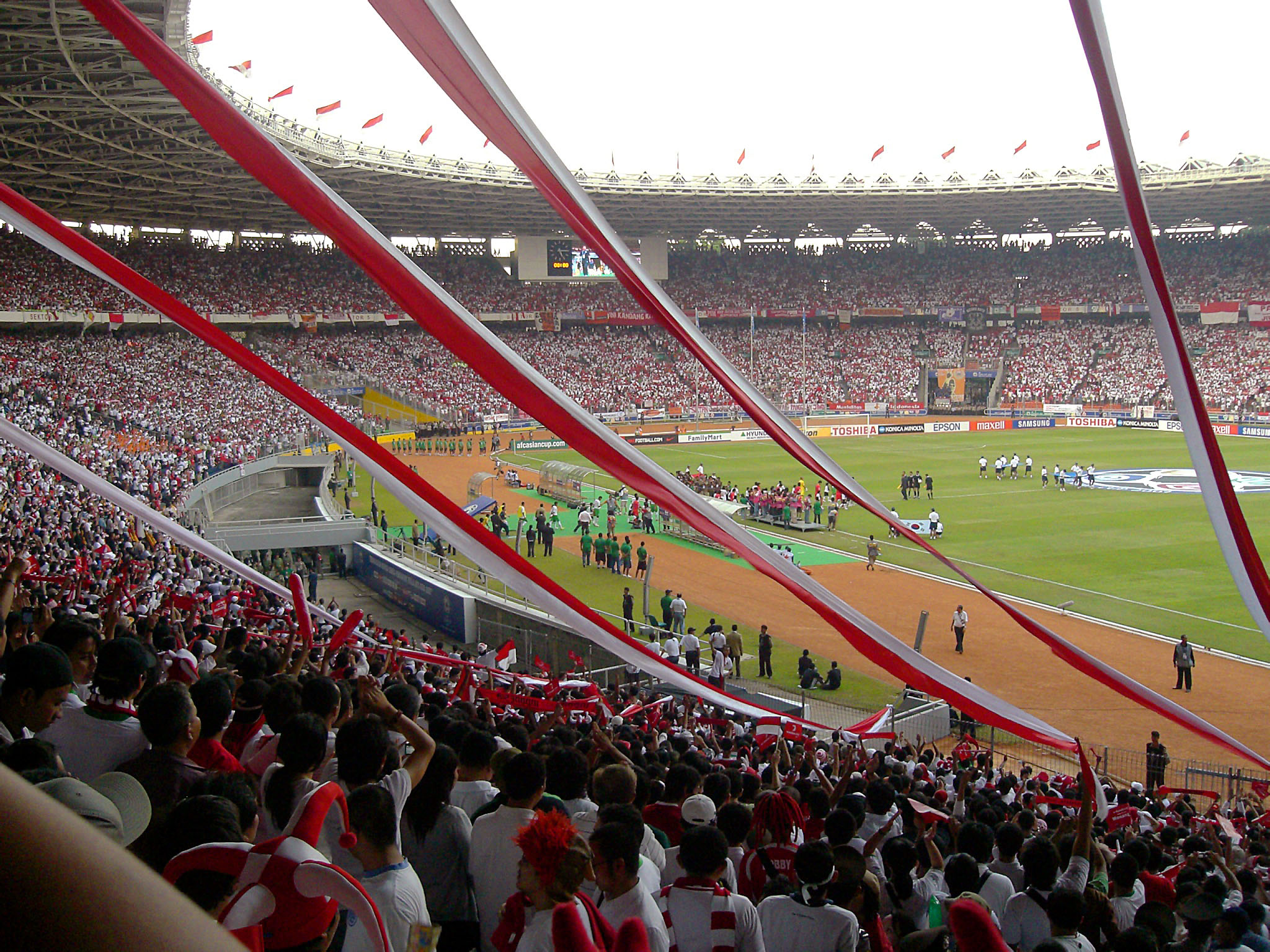
Fans at the Gelora Bung Karno Stadium for Asian Cup 2007

Football has become one of the most popular sports in Indonesia since the country's independence, even though it had virtually no presence in the country before then. in Indonesia, this phenomenon is most often ascribed to general worldwide popularity of the sport, which carried over into Indonesia following its rapid urbanization. It is played widely, both professionally and as recreation. Liga Indonesia, the Indonesian domestic league is widely popular. Some of the major teams include: Persib Bandung, Persebaya Surabaya, PSM Makassar, PSMS Medan, Persija Jakarta, PSIS Semarang, Sriwijaya F.C., Persipura Jayapura, Bali United and Arema Malang. The national body is the Football Association of Indonesia (PSSI).

The Indonesian football league started around 1930 in the Dutch colonial era. In 1993, PSSI combined the existing Perserikatan, an amateur competition, and Galatama, a semi-professional league, to be a single professional competition for Indonesian football clubs, known as the Indonesian Football League (Liga Indonesia). Starting from 2008–09 season onwards, the competition format changed into a more common system that is also being used in most European football leagues by adding a fully professional league by banning local government's funding, the Indonesia Super League, now Liga 1.

On the international stage, Indonesia experienced limited success despite being the first Asian team to play for the FIFA World Cup in 1938 as Dutch East Indies, when they replaced the withdrawn Japan. In 1956, the football team played in the Olympics and played a hard-fought draw against Soviet Union. The youth teams played in the 1979 FIFA World Youth Championship (U-20, replacing three losing teams from the 1978 AFC Youth Championship) and 2023 FIFA U-17 World Cup (U-17, qualified as hosts), eliminated in the group stage on both occasions. The 2023 U-17 World Cup was the first FIFA tournament to ever take place in the country. The U-17 team then qualified for the 2025 World Cup, the country's first successful qualification campaign to a FIFA tournament.

On the continental level, Indonesia won the football bronze medal in the 1958 Asian Games. Indonesia's first appearance in Asian Cup was back in 1996. The Indonesian national team has since qualified for the Asian Cup five times; in 2000, 2004, 2007, 2023, and 2027, advancing to the knockout stage for the first time in 2023.

=== Volleyball ===
Volleyball in Indonesia has been played since the Dutch colonial era. After being played as an official sport at the 1951 National Sports Week, the Indonesian Volleyball Federation was formed in 1955 and became the parent sport of volleyball in Indonesia. Until now, volleyball has become one of the popular sports played by the Indonesian people, both as study material at school, to fill their free time, and as a means of competition and also Volleyball becoming second most popular sports among Indonesian youth. The volleyball competition in Indonesia has been running, at least since the 1980s, as a professional competition for domestic volleyball athletes. Indonesia men's national volleyball team has also made several achievements in international competitions.

=== Basketball ===
Basketball is one of the most popular sports especially among Indonesian youth. The Indonesia Basketball League (IBL) or Liga Bola Basket Indonesia is the pre-eminent men's basketball league in Indonesia, competed by 160 clubs across the country. The competition started as Indonesian Basketball League (IBL) in 2003. In 2010, Perbasi appointed DBL Indonesia to handle the competition and changed the league's name to National Basketball League (NBL). The name changed back to IBL after Starting5 took over as the new league operator in 2015.

The Indonesia men's national basketball team's biggest success has been gold at the 1996 Southeast Asian Basketball Championship and the 2021 SEA Games.

Indonesia hosted the official 2022 Asian Basketball Championship and the country co-hosted the 2023 Basketball World Cup, together with the Philippines and Japan. Several matches were played in Jakarta at the newly build Indonesia Arena inside the GBK sports complex.

Additionally, a whole basketball league is dedicated to junior and senior students throughout Indonesia. This league is called DBL, which stands for Development Basketball League.

=== Futsal ===
Futsal is popular in Indonesia, with arenas in every city. Although futsal is relatively young in the country, it has become more popular due to the Indonesia Futsal Federation (Federasi Futsal Indonesia, FFI) which oversees the Indonesia national futsal team, and the local professional futsal league for both men and women. While the FFI is effectively a member of PSSI, they have relative autonomy in terms of futsal governance in Indonesia.

=== E-sports ===
There is a significant competitive video game scene in Indonesia. The first esports tournament in the country was a Super Mario Bros. competition, held in Surabaya in 1989. Many tournaments have sprung up since then, especially for online games such as StarCraft, Defense of the Ancients, Quake III, Age of Empires II, Point Blank, Lost Saga, and Counter-Strike. The esports scene in Indonesia received a significant boost when the country hosted the 2018 Asian Games, which included esports as a demonstration event. There are also major tournaments for mobile games such as Vainglory and Mobile Legends held in Jakarta. More recently, Indonesia hosted the third and final Major of the Dota Pro Circuit season, the Bali Major 2023.

=== Extreme sports ===
Extreme sports in Indonesia is increasing popularity such as BMX, Climbing, Motocross and Surfing, other extreme sports such as Skateboarding is also popular among urban youth across major cities in Indonesia.

==== Climbing ====
Climbing is the most popular extreme sports in Indonesia including Sport climbing and the most popular type of climbing is Competition climbing.

In the 2024 Summer Olympics, Veddriq Leonardo won the Olympic gold medal for speed climbing and became first non-Badminton athlete from Indonesia to win the Gold Medal.

==== Surfing ====
Surfing in Indonesia is a relatively young sport in Indonesia, the most popular Indonesian area for surfing are at Pangandaran, Banyuwangi, Lombok, and Bali. The most famous surfer from Indonesia right now is Dede Suryana.

=== Pencak silat ===
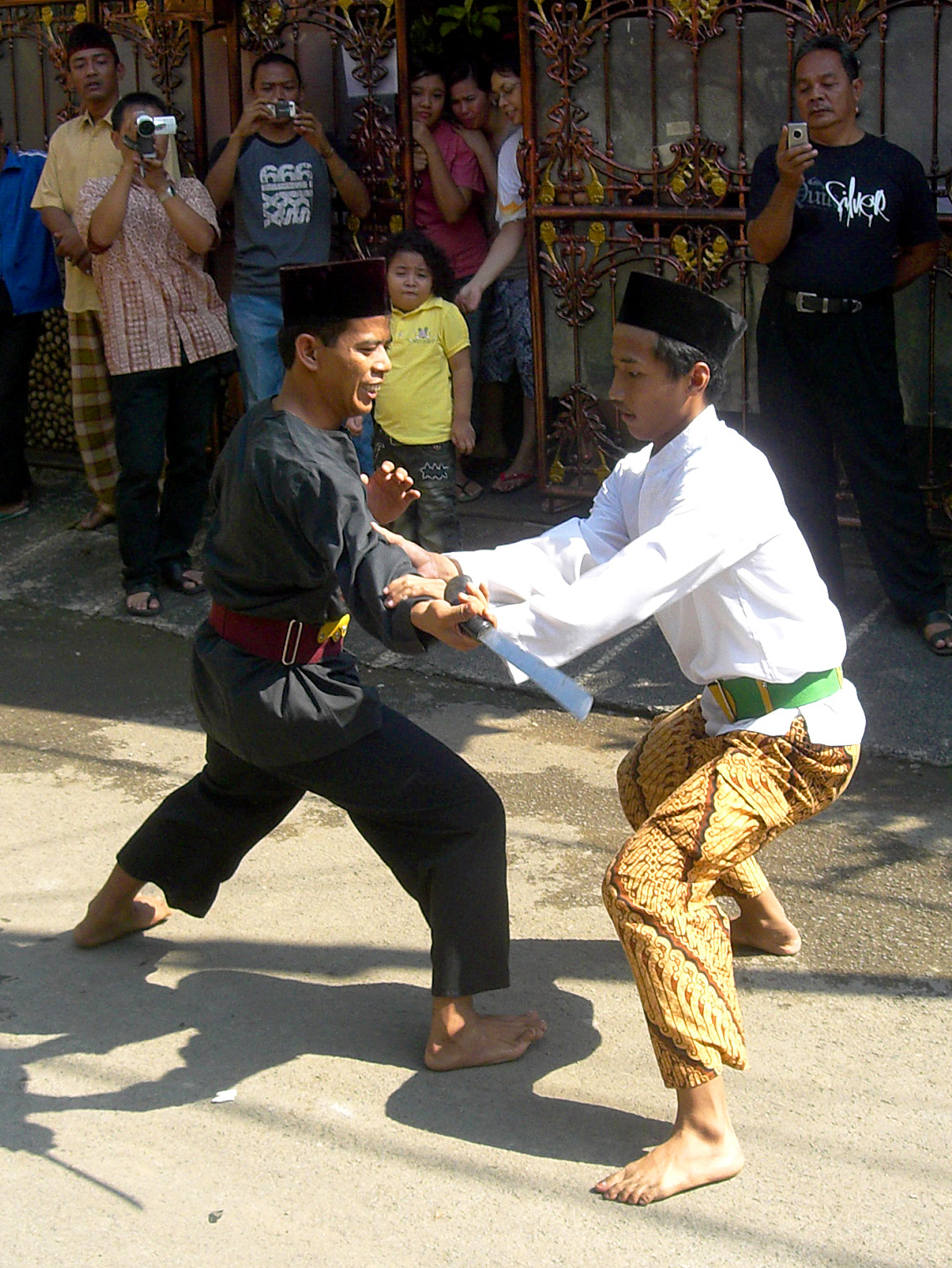
Pencak Silat, an Indonesian martial art.

Silat is an Indonesian native martial art, and pencak silat is an umbrella term for the indigenous martial arts created in Indonesia. The leading organisation of pencak silat in Indonesia is IPSI (Ikatan Pencak silat Indonesia meaning Organization for Indonesian pencak silat). The liaison body for international pencak silat is the International Pencak Silat Association or PERSILAT (Persekutuan Pencak Silat Antara Bangsa). There are many perguruan (schools) and styles of pencak silat in Indonesia.

Pencak silat has become one of sporting event in Pekan Olahraga Nasional and Southeast Asian Games with Indonesia as appear as one of the leading force in this sport. This martial art sport is also popular in Malaysia, Singapore, Thailand and Vietnam.

=== Cycling ===
Indonesia host some international road cycling tours; such as the annual Tour de Indonesia, Tour de Singkarak and Tour de East Java. Inspired by European Tour de France, these tours is one of the esteemed cycling event in Southeast Asian region and has attracted local as well as foreign cycling teams. Tour d'Indonesia usually started in Jakarta, across inland Java all the way eastward to Bali, while Tour de Singkarak is held in West Sumatra touring around Lake Singkarak. In track cycling numbers, Indonesia is also one of the strongest in the region and often won gold medals in Southeast Asia Games. Indonesia have world class velodromes in Rawamangun, Jakarta; and Kutai Kartanegara, East Kalimantan, hailed as one of the best velodrome in Southeast Asia.

For non-athlete common Indonesians, riding bicycle is considered as the mode of transportation as well as a recreational and leisure sport. It is quite popular in Indonesia, especially during Car-Free Days in several cities. During weekends, especially around Saturday and Sunday morning, cyclist flocking Jakarta's main avenue such as Jalan Thamrin and Jalan Sudirman that is closed from cars, municipal authorities invited locals to have their sports and activities on the street. The Bike-to-Work community was established in Indonesia in 2005 to promote cycling as a cheap, healthy, and environment friendly mode of transportation to the workplace.

Extreme cycling, such as Mountain biking and urban Freestyle BMX is also popular among youth in main cities of Indonesia.

=== Boxing ===
Boxing is a popular combative sport spectacle in Indonesia. Some famous Indonesian boxers include Ellyas Pical, three times IBF Super flyweight champion; Nico Thomas, Muhammad Rachman, and Chris John.

=== Sepak takraw ===
Sepak takraw spread from China to the Indonesian archipelago, the game is believed to have evolved from cuju, a game similar to association football that was used as military training. In Indonesia, Sepak Takraw is also known as Sepak Raga in the local language in Indonesia. In Sulawesi, the traditional Bugis football game is called "Raga" (the player is called "Pa'Raga"). Some of the men playing the "Raga" circle in a group, the ball is passed from one to the other and the man who kicks the highest ball is the winner. "Raga" is also played for fun by demonstrating several tricks, such as kicking the ball and placing it on the player's head with the handle of the tengkolok bugis (Bugis headgear similar to a Malay tanjak).

After Sepak takraw was developed into modern competitive sport in 1940s with exact rules and scoring systems, Indonesia has become one of major sepak takraw power in the region, competing against Thailand and Malaysian teams.

=== Motorsport ===
Motorsport in not a common sport in Indonesia, despite this, the sport has a huge following in Indonesia and there are some notable Indonesian motorsport competitors. For example, Rio Haryanto was the first Indonesian driver who competed in Formula One for Manor Racing at the 2016 Formula One Season, Sean Gelael is an ex Formula Two driver and now competing in World Endurance Championship for W Racing Team, Mario Aji is Indonesian Moto2 driver for Idemitsu Honda Team Asia. Indonesia also held some races for Formula E at Jakarta International e-Prix Circuit and MotoGP at Mandalika International Street Circuit. Indonesia used to held World Rally Championship in 1996 and 1997.

== Sports leagues in Indonesia ==
Football

- Super League
Futsal

- Indonesia Pro Futsal League
- Indonesia Women's Pro Futsal League
Basketball

- Indonesian Basketball League
Volleyball

- Men's Proliga
- Women's Proliga

== Competitions ==
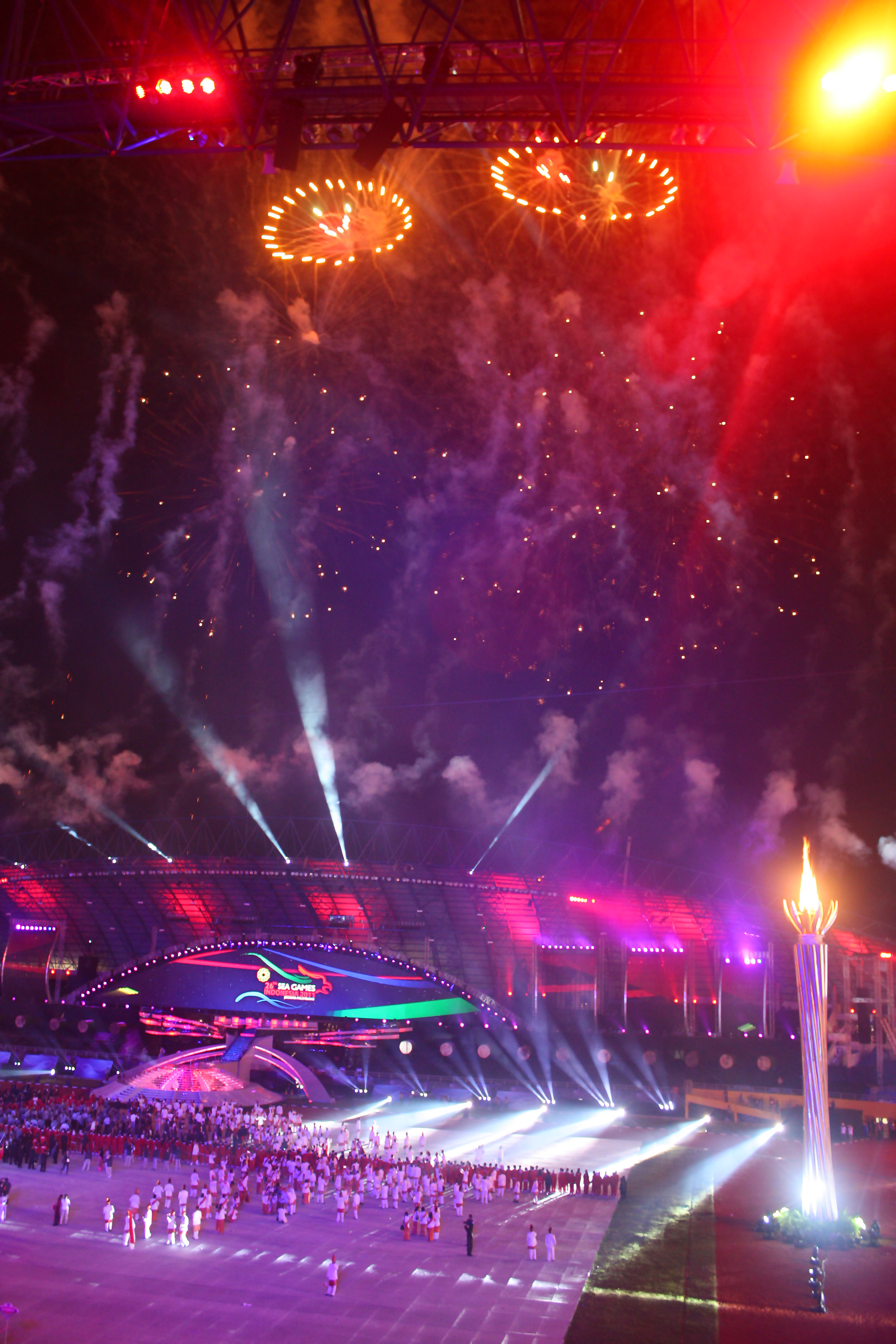
SEA Games 2011 opening ceremony in Palembang, South Sumatra.

The Pekan Olahraga Nasional (National Sports Week) are held every four years. Indonesia also participates in international sporting events such as the Olympic Games (see Indonesia at the Olympics). the Asian Games and the South East Asian Games (SEA Games). 2018 Asian Games was held at Jakarta, Palembang, and some other venues in the provinces of West Java and Banten.

=== Sports tournaments ===
Game	Tournament
Badminton	Indonesia Open
Badminton	Indonesia Masters
Badminton	Indonesia Masters Super 100
Badminton	Indonesia International
Football	Indonesian Independence Cup
Football	Jakarta Anniversary Tournament
Golf	Indonesia Open
Golf	Indonesia Ladies Open
Golf	Indonesian Masters
Tennis	Commonwealth Bank Tennis Classic
Tennis	Danamon Open
Tennis	Jakarta Open

=== Hosted sporting events ===
Year	Event	Sport	Location	Date		Status
Year	Event	Sport	Location	Start	End	Status
1961	Thomas Cup	Badminton	Jakarta	1 Jun	11 Jun	International
1962	Asian Games	Multi-sport event	Jakarta	24 Aug	4 Sep	Continental
1963	GANEFO	Multi-sport event	Jakarta	10 Nov	22 Nov	International
1967	Thomas Cup	Badminton	Jakarta	31 May	10 Jun	International
1971	Asian Badminton Championships	Badminton	Jakarta	13 Aug	21 Aug	Continental
1972	Badminton World Invitational Championships	Badminton	Jakarta			International
1974	Badminton World Invitational Championships	Badminton	Jakarta			International
1975	Uber Cup	Badminton	Jakarta	31 May	6 Jun	International
1977	Asian Amateur Boxing Championships	Amateur boxing	Jakarta	13 Oct	20 Oct	Continental
1979	Thomas Cup	Badminton	Jakarta	1 Jun	2 Jun	International
1980	IBF World Championships	Badminton	Jakarta	27 May	1 Jun	International
1981	World Lifesaving Championships	Lifesaving	Bali	1 May	3 May	International
1981	Asian Judo Championships	Judo	Jakarta	15 Jul	18 Jul	Continental
1986	Thomas & Uber Cup	Badminton	Jakarta	22 Apr	4 May	International
1986	FESPIC Games	Multi-sport event	Surakarta	31 Aug	7 Sep	Continental
1987	Asian Junior and Cadet Table Tennis Championships	Table tennis	Kediri	14 Nov	21 Nov	Continental
1988	Asian Invitational Badminton Championships	Badminton	Bandar Lampung	6 Nov	10 Nov	Continental
1989	Sudirman Cup	Badminton	Jakarta	24 May	29 May	International
1990	World Badminton Grand Prix Finals	Badminton	Denpasar	12 Dec	16 Dec	International
1992	IBF World Junior Championships	Badminton	Jakarta	8 Nov	14 Nov	International
1993	ABC Championship	Basketball	Jakarta	12 Nov	21 Nov	Continental
1994	Thomas & Uber Cup	Badminton	Jakarta	10 May	21 May	International
1994	ATP Tour World Championships	Tennis	Jakarta	21 Nov	27 Nov	International
1995	World Archery Championships	Archery	Jakarta	1 Aug	6 Aug	International
1996	SEABA Championship	Basketball	Surabaya	24 Nov	1 Dec	Regional
1997	Badminton World Cup	Badminton	Jakarta	20 Aug	24 Aug	International
2000	Asian Athletics Championships	Athletics	Jakarta	28 Aug	31 Aug	Continental
2000	World Pencak Silat Championships	Pencak silat	Jakarta	14 Nov	19 Nov	International
2004	Thomas & Uber Cup	Badminton	Jakarta	7 May	16 May	International
2004	ASEAN University Games	Multi-sport event	Surabaya	5 Dec	12 Dec	Regional
2007	AFC Asian Cup	Association football	Jakarta; Palembang	7 Jul	29 Jul	Continental
2006	BIMP-EAGA Friendship Games	Multi-sport event	Makassar	24 Nov	26 Nov	Regional
2008	Thomas & Uber Cup	Badminton	Jakarta	11 May	18 May	International
2008	Asian Beach Games	Multi-sport event	Bali	18 Oct	26 Oct	Continental
2008	IPSC Handgun World Shoot	Shooting	Bali	22 Oct	1 Nov	International
2009	SEABA Championship	Basketball	Medan	6 Jun	9 Jun	Regional
2009	Asian Cycling Championships	Cycling	Tenggarong; Samarinda	14 Aug	20 Aug	Continental
2009	WTA Tournament of Champions	Tennis	Bali	4 Nov	8 Nov	International
2009	Asian Archery Championships	Archery	Denpasar	16 Nov	21 Nov	Continental
2010	Asian Women's Club Volleyball Championship	Volleyball	Gresik	26 Jun	4 Jul	Continental
2010	WTA Tournament of Champions	Tennis	Bali	4 Nov	7 Nov	International
2010	Asian Development Tour (Bali)	Golf	Bali	6 Nov		International
2011	SEA Games	Multi-sport event	Jakarta; Palembang	11 Nov	22 Nov	Regional
2011	ASEAN Para Games	Multi-sport event	Surakarta	15 Dec	20 Dec	Regional
2012	Asian Development Tour (Taman Dayu)	Golf	Pasuruan	7 Jul		International
2012	Asian Aerobic Gymnastics Championships	Aerobic gymnastics	Palembang	18 Oct	19 Oct	Continental
2013	SEABA Championship	Basketball	Medan	20 Jun	23 Jun	Regional
2013	AFF U-19 Youth Championship	Association football	Sidoarjo; Gresik	9 Sep	22 Sep	Regional
2013	Islamic Solidarity Games	Multi-sport event	Palembang	22 Sep	1 Oct	International
2014	SEABA Cup	Basketball	Batam	21 May	23 May	Regional
2014	SEABA Championship for Women	Basketball	Semarang	26 May	29 May	Regional
2014	SEABA Under-18 Championship for Women	Basketball	Semarang	26 May	29 May	Regional
2014	IFSC Climbing Asian Championships	Sport climbing	Lombok	1 Oct	3 Oct	Continental
2014	ASEAN University Games	Multi-sport event	Palembang	11 Dec	21 Dec	Regional
2015	Asian Women's Handball Championship	Handball	Jakarta	14 Mar	23 Mar	Continental
2015	Asian Baseball Cup (Eastern Division)	Baseball	Jakarta	3 May	8 May	Continental
2015	BWF World Championships	Badminton	Jakarta	10 Aug	16 Aug	International
2015	World Paragliding Accuracy Championships	Paragliding	Puncak	11 Aug	16 Aug	International
2015	Asian Canoe Sprint Championships	Canoeing	Palembang	4 Nov	8 Nov	Continental
2015	World Cadet, Junior and U21 Karate Championships	Karate	Jakarta	11 Nov	15 Nov	International
2015	World Wushu Championships	Wushu	Jakarta	14 Nov	18 Nov	International
2015	Badminton Asia U17 & U15 Junior Championships	Badminton	Kudus	7 Oct	11 Oct	Continental
2016	SEABA Under-18 Championship	Basketball	Medan	23 Apr	28 Apr	Regional
2016	TAFISA World Sport for All Games	Multi-sport event	Jakarta	6 Oct	12 Oct	International
2016	World Pencak Silat Championships	Pencak silat	Denpasar	3 Dec	8 Dec	International
2016	BIMP-EAGA Friendship Games	Multi-sport event	Samarinda	7 Dec	10 Dec	Regional
2016	South East Asian Table Tennis Championships	Table tennis	Makassar	21 Dec	24 Dec	Regional
2017	Asian Powerlifting Championships	Powerlifting	Soreang	5 May		Continental
2017	Asian Men's Volleyball Championship	Volleyball	Gresik	24 Jul	1 Aug	Continental
2017	Asian Women's Youth Handball Championship	Handball	Jakarta	20 Aug	28 Aug	Continental
2017	BWF World Junior Championships	Badminton	Yogyakarta	9 Oct	22 Oct	International
2018	Asian Men's Softball Championship	Softball	Jakarta	23 Apr	28 Apr	Continental
2018	Asian Junior Gymnastics Championships	Artistic gymnastics	Jakarta	25 Apr	28 Apr	Continental
2018	Asian Sailing Championship	Sailing	Jakarta	24 Jun	30 Jun	Continental
2018	AFF Women's Championship	Association football	Palembang	30 Jun	13 Jul	Regional
2018	AFF Futsal Club Championship	Futsal	Yogyakarta	15 Jul	21 Jul	Regional
2018	Badminton Asia Junior Championships	Badminton	Jakarta	14 Jul	22 Jul	Continental
2018	AFC Futsal Club Championship	Futsal	Yogyakarta	1 Aug	12 Aug	Continental
2018	Asian Games	Multi-sport event	Jakarta; Palembang	18 Aug	2 Sep	Continental
2018	Asian Para Games	Multi-sport event	Jakarta	6 Oct	13 Oct	Continental
2018	AFC U-19 Championship	Association football	Jakarta	18 Oct	4 Nov	Continental
2018	AFF Futsal Championship	Futsal	Yogyakarta	5 Nov	11 Nov	Regional
2018	South East Asian Table Tennis Championships	Table tennis	Bali	15 Nov	18 Nov	Regional
2018	AFF Beach Soccer Championship	Beach soccer	Bali	18 Nov	24 Nov	Regional
2019	ASEAN School Games	Multi-sport event	Semarang	17 Jul	25 Jul	Regional
2019	Asian Track Cycling Championships	Track cycling	Jakarta	9 Jan	13 Jan	Continental
2019	Asian Table Tennis Championships	Table tennis	Yogyakarta	15 Sep	22 Sep	Continental
2019	IFSC Climbing Asian Championships	Sport climbing	Bogor	6 Nov	10 Nov	Continental
2021	BWF World Tour Finals	Badminton	Bali	1 Dec	5 Dec	International
2022	ISSF Grand Prix	Shooting	Jakarta	8 Feb	18 Feb	International
2022	Men's AHF Cup	Field hockey	Jakarta	11 Mar	20 Mar	Continental
2022	MotoGP World Championship	Motorcycle racing	Lombok	20 Mar		International
2022	Men's Hockey Asia Cup	Field hockey	Jakarta	23 May	1 Jun	Continental
2022	World Surf League	Surfing	Banyuwangi	28 May	6 Jun	International
2022	ASEAN Para Games	Multi-sport event	Surakarta	30 Jul	6 Aug	Regional
2022	FIBA Asia Cup	Basketball	Jakarta	12 Jul	24 Jul	Continental
2022	Asia Rugby Sevens Series Trophy	Rugby sevens	Jakarta	6 Aug	7 Aug	Continental
2022	UCI Mountain Bike World Cup	Cycling	Palangka Raya	28 Aug		International
2022	World Junior Wushu Championships	Wushu	Tangerang	5 Dec	11 Dec	International
2022	Asian Open Figure Skating Trophy	Figure skating	Jakarta	7 Dec	11 Dec	Continental
2023	ISSF World Cup	Shooting	Jakarta	27 Jan	7 Feb	International
2023	Formula 1 Powerboat World Championship	Boat racing	Lake Toba	23 Feb	26 Feb	International
2023	IFSC Climbing World Cup	Sport climbing	Jakarta	6 May	7 May	International
2023	Asian Men's Beach Handball Championship	Beach Handball	Bali	10 Mar	19 Mar	Continental
2023	Asian Women's Beach Handball Championship	Beach Handball	Bali	10 Mar	19 Mar	Continental
2023	Formula E World Championship	Auto racing	Jakarta	3 Jun	4 Jun	International
2023	Asian Women's Volleyball Challenge Cup	Volleyball	Gresik	18 Jun	25 Jun	Continental
2023	AFF U-19 Women's Championship	Association football	Palembang	5 Jul	15 Jul	Regional
2023	Badminton Asia Junior Championships	Badminton	Yogyakarta	7 Jul	16 Jul	Continental
2023	SEA Men's V.League – First Leg	Volleyball	Bogor	21 Jul	30 Jul	Regional
2023	SEA Age Group Swimming Championships	Swimming	Jakarta	24 Aug	26 Aug	Regional
2023	FIBA Basketball World Cup	Basketball	Jakarta	25 Aug	10 Sep	International
2023	MotoGP World Championship	Motorcycle racing	Lombok	15 Oct		International
2023	Asian Sport Climbing Olympic Qualifier	Sport climbing	Jakarta	9 Nov	12 Nov	Continental
2023	UCI MTB Eliminator World Championships	Cycling	Palangka Raya	12 Nov		International
2023	FIFA U-17 World Cup	Association football	Jakarta; Bandung; Surabaya; Surakarta	10 Nov	2 Dec	International
2023	Aquabike World Championship	Boat racing	Lake Toba	23 Nov	26 Nov	International
2024	Asian Rifle/Pistol Championships	Shooting	Jakarta	8 Jan	17 Jan	Continental
2024	AFC U-17 Women's Asian Cup	Association football	Bali	7 Apr	20 Apr	Continental
2024	ASEAN University Games	Multi-sport event	Surabaya; Malang	25 Jun	6 Jul	Regional
2024	Badminton Asia Junior Championships	Badminton	Yogyakarta	28 Jun	7 Jul	Continental
2024	ASEAN U-16 Boys Championship	Association football	Surakarta	21 Jun	3 Jul	Regional
2024	ASEAN U-19 Boys Championship	Association football	Surabaya	17 Jul	29 Jul	Regional
2024	Asian Men's U20 Volleyball Championship	Volleyball	Surabaya	23 Jul	30 Jul	Continental
2024	Asian School Badminton Championships	Badminton	Semarang	24 Aug	2 Sep	Continental
2024	MotoGP World Championship	Motorcycle racing	Lombok	29 Sep		International
2025	Men's AHF Cup	Field hockey	Jakarta	17 Apr	27 Apr	Continental
2025	Women's AHF Cup	Field hockey	Jakarta	18 Apr	27 Apr	Continental
2025	IFSC Climbing World Cup	Sport climbing	Bali	2 May	4 May	International
2025	Asian Fencing Championships	Fencing	Bali	14 Jun	19 Jun	Continental
2025	Badminton Asia Junior Championships	Badminton	Surakarta	18 Jul	27 Jul	Continental
2025	FIVB Volleyball Women's U21 World Championship	Volleyball	Surabaya	7 Aug	17 Aug	International
2025	Asian Cup Woodball Championship	Woodball	Bogor	18 Aug	25 Aug	Continental
2025	World Artistic Gymnastics Championships	Artistic gymnastics	Jakarta	19 Oct	25 Oct	International
2025	Southeast Asian Youth Athletics Championships	Athletics	Deli Serdang	15 Nov	18 Nov	Regional
2025	IFCPF Asia-Oceania Cup	CP football	Surakarta	16 Nov	22 Nov	Continental
2025	Asian Minifootball Champions League	Minifootball	Jakarta	17 Nov	23 Nov	Continental
2025	World Cyber Games	Esports	Jakarta	12 Dec	14 Dec	International
2026	AFC Futsal Asian Cup	Futsal	Jakarta	27 Jan	7 Feb	Continental
2026	FIFA Series (men's matches)	Association football	Jakarta	27 Mar	30 Mar	International
2026	AVC Men's Volleyball Champions League	Volleyball	Pontianak	13 May	17 May	Continental
2026	ASEAN U-17 Boys' Championship	Association football	Gresik; Sidoarjo	11 Apr	24 Apr	Regional
2026	ASEAN U-19 Boys' Championship	Association football	Deli Serdang; Medan	1 Jun	13 Jun	Regional
2026	Asian Karate Championships	Karate	Bali	18 Jun	21 Jun	Continental
2026	FIFA ASEAN Cup	Association football	Jakarta; Bandung	25 Sep	5 Oct	Regional
2026	ASEAN School Games	Multi-sport event	Jakarta			Regional

== See also ==
- Indonesia at the Olympics
- Indonesia at the Paralympics
- Indonesia at the Deaflympics
- Indonesia at the Youth Olympics
- Indonesia at the World Games
- Indonesia at the Asian Games
- Indonesia at the Asian Para Games
- Indonesia at the SEA Games
- Indonesia at the ASEAN Para Games
- Indonesia at the Islamic Solidarity Games
- Indonesia at the FIFA World Cup
- Indonesia at the AFC Asian Cup
