= Nusantara Women's Futsal League =

Top league for futsal in Indonesia

- Organising body: FFI
- Founded: 2015; 11 years ago
- Country: Indonesia
- Confederation: AFC (Asia)
- Level on pyramid: 2
- Promotion to: Indonesia Women's Pro Futsal League
- Current champions: Muara Enim United (1 title)
- Broadcaster(s): MNCTV, Sportstars
- Current: 2023 Nusantara Futsal League

Nusantara Women's Futsal League is the second-tier competition in the Women's futsal sports competition structure organized by the Indonesia Futsal Federation. This competition started in the 2015 season.

== List of champions ==
| Year | Winner | Runner-up | Ref |
|---|---|---|---|
| 2015 | PAF UNY | Lampung Angels | |
| 2016 | Kebumen United Angels | Football Plus | |
| 2017 | Pansa | Women IKIP Budi Utomo | |
| 2018 | Meta | Putri Musi Rawas | |
| 2019 | KJI | Female Jakarta | |
| 2021 | Muara Enim United | D'Alexa Idola | |
| 2023 | MS FPB | Alive | |
| 2024 | KLN Angels | KS Futsal | |

== List of best players ==
| Year | Player | Club | Ref |
|---|---|---|---|
| 2015 | Rika Riyana | PAF UNY | |
| 2016 | Ade Mustikina | Kebumen United Angels | |
| 2017 | Dewi Tia | Pansa | |
| 2018 | Sheva Imut | Meta | |
| 2019 | Isma Rumtika | KJI | |
| 2022 | Ananda Putri Lestari | Muara Enim United | |
| 2023 | Melly Azhara | MS FPB | |

== List of best top-goalscorers ==
| Year | Player | Club | Goal | Ref |
|---|---|---|---|---|
| 2015 | Aulia Nur Hikmatin | PAF UNY | | |
| 2016 | Syenida Meryfandina | Lady Phantom | 15 | |
| 2017 | Dewi Tia | Pansa | | |
| 2018 | Sheva Imut | Meta | | |
| 2019 | Nurazisah | MAS Umum | 6 | |
| 2022 | Runi Sulistia Oktari | Muara Enim United | | |
| 2023 | Nabila Saputri; Arlince Tuan | MS FPB | | |

== See also ==
- Indonesia Pro Futsal League
- Indonesia Women's Pro Futsal League
- Nusantara Futsal League
