= Nusantara Futsal League =

Third-tier league for futsal in Indonesia

- Organising body: KFI
- Founded: 2015; 11 years ago
- Country: Indonesia
- Confederation: AFC (Asia)
- Level on pyramid: 3
- Promotion to: Indonesia Pro Futsal League 2
- Relegation to: none
- Current champions: Asahan (1st title)
- Broadcaster(s): MNCTV, Sportstars
- Current: 2025 Nusantara Futsal League

Nusantara Futsal League is the third-tier competition in the futsal sports competition structure organized by the Indonesia Futsal Federation. This competition started in the 2015 season.

== List of champions ==
Year	Winner	Runner-up	Third-place	Ref.
2015	Mataram	WPK MBU	Black Steel	
2016	Dyvy SFC Planet	APK CPS	Kancil BBK	
2017	Halus	DLS	SDR	
2018	Bifor	Young Rior	Devina	
2019	BJL 2000	Jeck Kato	AXM	
2022	Banteng Muda Unggul	Radit	Juku Eja	
2023	Moncongbulo Muda	Kinantan	Excellent	
2024	Kuda Laut Nusantara	Rafhely	Juku Eja	
2025	Asahan	Raybit	Member Radit	

== List of best players ==
Year	Player	Club
2015	Samuel Amos	Mataram
2016	Nizar Nayaruddin	Dyvy SFC Planet
2017	Afif Rizky	Halus
2018	Marcel Peter Ireeuw	Bifor
2019	Dede Novian	BJL 2000
2022	Vicky Irawan	Banteng Muda Unggul
2023	Farhan Almuhtazan	Moncongbulo Muda
2024	Khoirul Anwar Assidiq	Kuda Laut Nusantara
2025		

== List of top-goalscorers ==
Year	Player	Club	Goal
2015	No data		
2016	Samuel Eko	Kancil BBK	9
2017	Danang Kurniadi; Harry Yunandar	DLS; SDR	5
2018	Hasriady Nur	Young Rior	7
2019	Fikriansyah	AMX	6
2022	Andres Dwi Persada	Banteng Muda Unggul	
2023	Zehdi Insana Kamil	Moncongbulo Muda	9
2024	Khoirul Anwar Assidiq	Kuda Laut Nusantara	
2025			

== See also ==
- Indonesia Pro Futsal League
- Indonesia Women's Pro Futsal League
- Nusantara Women's Futsal League
