= Indonesia Pro Futsal League 2 =

Second tier futsal league in Indonesia

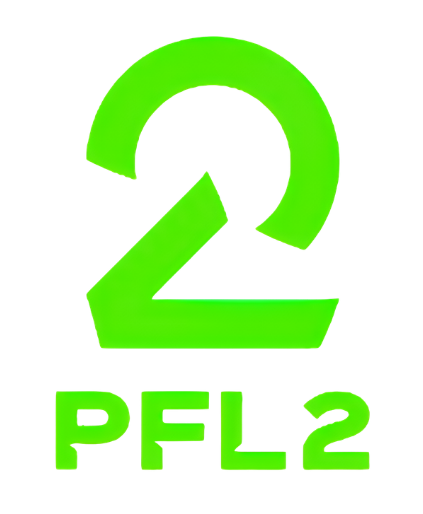
- Organising body: KFI
- Founded: 2026; 0 years ago as Indonesia Pro Futsal League 2 (PFL 2)
- Country: Indonesia
- Confederation: AFC (Asia)
- Number of clubs: 8
- Level on pyramid: 2
- Promotion to: Indonesia Pro Futsal League
- Relegation to: Nusantara Futsal League
- Current champions: Proton Kuningan (1st title) (2026)
- Most championships: Proton Kuningan (1 title)
- Website: https://pflindonesia.com/
- Current: 2026 Indonesia Pro Futsal League 2

Indonesia Pro Futsal League 2 (Indonesian: Liga Futsal Profesional Indonesia 2), commonly known as PFL 2, is the second-tier professional men's futsal league in Indonesia. It is organized by the Indonesia Futsal Federation (FFI) and operated by PT Kompetisi Futsal Indonesia (PT KFI). The league commenced its inaugural season in April 2026, beginning on 23 April 2026 at GOR Sabilulungan Si Jalak Harupat, Bandung Regency.

PFL 2 was formally announced by FFI on 2 August 2025 alongside the establishment of the new Operator Liga Profesional. The league is designed as a development league, serving as the primary feeder system for the Indonesia Pro Futsal League (PFL), providing a structured pathway for clubs and players to develop to the professional level. An open club selection process was launched on 2 November 2025 by PT KFI, with the competition period scheduled for April–June 2026.

== History ==
The FFI announced the formation of a dedicated Operator Liga Profesional on 2 August 2025, an entity mandated to manage the PFL, PFL 2, and Indonesia Women's Pro Futsal League (WPFL) under FFI supervision. As part of this announcement, PFL 2 was introduced as a new professional league tier to begin in 2026.

FFI Secretary General Perbager stated: "The formation of the Professional League Operator and PFL 2 is an important step. The Operator will ensure the management of the league is more professional, while PFL 2 is designed to comprehensively develop talent and club capacity. This is not just about competition, but also about building a strong foundation for the future."

FFI Chairman Michael Sianipar added: "PFL 2 is not merely a development competition, but an integral part of the professional league system we are building."

== Format ==
PFL 2 uses a regional conference format to minimise travel costs while maintaining competitive intensity. Clubs compete for the championship title and a promotion ticket to the Indonesia Pro Futsal League.

=== Club Slots ===
The initial structure of PFL 2 slots was set as follows:

- 8 Preferential Slots — Awarded based on an FFI assessment of clubs deemed eligible based on their performance and readiness in the 2024–25 season.
- 8 Expansion Slots — Open through a licence bidding process, with priority given to clubs that have a track record in official FFI competitions, such as achieving the top 38 of the Nusantara Futsal League.

=== Selection Timeline (Inaugural Season) ===
Phase	Period
Application submission opening	2–25 November 2025
Administrative verification	26–30 November 2025
Interview and eligibility assessment	1–5 December 2025
Announcement of licensed clubs	8 December 2025
Optional extension / payment period	January–February 2026
Kick-off meeting and official participant announcement	March 2026
Competition period	April–June 2026

== Teams ==
The following 8 clubs competed in the inaugural 2026 Indonesia Pro Futsal League 2 season.

Team	City	Province
Elano	Tuban	East Java
Futsal Mbak Adjeng	Lubuklinggau	South Sumatra
Giga	Metro	Lampung
Great Grace	Surabaya	East Java
Hampton	Surabaya	East Java
KLN Elite	Jakarta	Jakarta
Maestro	Surakarta	Central Java
Proton	Kuningan	West Java

== Seasons ==
Season	Champion	Runner-up	Ref.
2026	TBD	TBD	

== See also ==
- Indonesia Pro Futsal League
- Indonesia Women's Pro Futsal League
- Nusantara Futsal League
- Indonesia national futsal team
- Indonesia Futsal Federation
