= PT Kompetisi Futsal Indonesia =

Indonesian futsal league operator

Kompetisi Futsal Indonesia
- Company type: Private
- Industry: Futsal
- Predecessors: Federasi Futsal Indonesia (competition organiser, 2006–2025)
- Founded: 1 October 2025; 8 months ago
- Headquarters: Jakarta, Indonesia
- Area served: Indonesia
- Key people: Rorian Pratyaksa (Chief Executive)
- Products: Pro Futsal League; Women's Pro Futsal League; Pro Futsal League 2; Nusantara Futsal League
- Owners: FFI
- Website: https://www.kompetisifutsal.id/

Kompetisi Futsal Indonesia (Indonesian: Indonesian Futsal Competition; abbreviated KFI), officially PT Kompetisi Futsal Indonesia, is an Indonesian company created by the Indonesia Futsal Federation (FFI) to operate and organise Indonesian futsal competitions, namely the Pro Futsal League (PFL), the Women's Pro Futsal League (WPFL), Pro Futsal League 2 (PFL 2), and the Nusantara Futsal League (NFL).

== History ==
=== Origin ===
Prior to KFI's establishment, all futsal competitions in Indonesia were organised directly by the Indonesia Futsal Federation (FFI). KFI was established in 2025 by FFI as part of an effort to professionalize futsal competition management, separating the operator function from the federation — following a similar model to football's I-League under PSSI, and basketball's Indonesian Basketball League (IBL).

=== 2025–present ===
In the 2025–26 season, KFI officially operated the Indonesia Pro Futsal League with state-owned enterprise Permodalan Nasional Madani (PNM) as the main sponsor, and MNC Media holding broadcasting rights. A closed-league system was also introduced for both the PFL and WPFL, with club participation determined through managerial, financial, technical, and legal evaluations by FFI.

As part of the league ecosystem development, KFI introduced Pro Futsal League 2 (PFL 2) in 2026, a development league using a regional conference format. Club selection was conducted through an open licensing process consisting of 8 preferential slots for eligible clubs from previous seasons and 8 expansion slots open via licence bidding, with priority given to clubs with track records in the former Nusantara Futsal League.

On 24 February 2026, KFI held an Owners Meeting with club owners and managers from the WPFL and PFL 2 to build strategies for Indonesia's professional futsal industry, focusing on three pillars: improving competition quality, expanding media reach, and optimising commercial potential beyond matchdays.

In 2026, the traditional Liga Futsal Nusantara was officially rebranded and restructured into the Nusantara Futsal League. Under KFI's management, it serves as the second-tier regional competition that feeds talent into the professional national structure, forming the foundation of Indonesia's revised futsal pyramid.

== Board of Directors ==
As of 2025

Position	Name
Chief Executive / Director	(Indonesia) Rorian Pratyaksa

== Competitions Operated ==
Competition	Level	Gender	Notes
Pro Futsal League (PFL)	1st	Men	Highest professional men's futsal league in Indonesia
Women's Pro Futsal League (WPFL)	1st	Women	Highest professional women's futsal league in Indonesia
Pro Futsal League 2 (PFL 2)	2nd (National)	Men	Men's professional development league, introduced in 2026
Nusantara Futsal League (NFL)	2nd (Regional)	Men	Regional-level professional league; rebranded from Liga Futsal Nusantara in 2026
