= Table tennis at the 2021 SEA Games – Men's doubles =

Table tennis – Men's doubles at the 2021 SEA Games
- Venue: Hải Dương Gymnasium
- Dates: 17–18 May 2022
- Competitors: 24 from 7 nations

Medalists
gold medal	Clarence Chew Zhe Yu; Ethan Poh Shao Feng	Singapore
silver medal	Richard Gonzales; John Russel Misal	Philippines
bronze medal	Javen Choong; Wong Qi Shen	Malaysia
bronze medal	Koen Pang Yew En; Joshua Chua Shao Han	Singapore

The men's doubles competition of the table tennis event at the 2021 SEA Games was held from 17 to 18 May at the Hải Dương Gymnasium in Hải Dương, Vietnam.

== Participating nations ==
A total of 24 athletes from six nations competed in men's doubles table tennis at the 2021 Southeast Asian Games:

- Cambodia (4)
- Malaysia (4)
- Philippines (4)
- Singapore (4)
- Thailand (4)
- Vietnam (4)

== Schedule ==
All times are Vietnam Time (UTC+07:00).

Date	Time	Round
Tuesday, 17 May 2022	14:30	Round of 16
Tuesday, 17 May 2022	19:30	Quarterfinals
Wednesday, 18 May 2022	11:00	Semifinals
Wednesday, 18 May 2022	16:00	Final

== Results ==
Source: Event Summary

Round of 16; 17 May 14:30
(Vietnam) Nguyễn AT (Vietnam) Đoàn BTA
Bye
(Philippines) JM Nayre (Philippines) JM Castro	6	3	7	0
(Malaysia) J Choong (Malaysia) Wong QS	11	11	11	3
(Cambodia) Soeung T (Cambodia) Sarak SP	11	11	8	4	7	2
(Thailand) P Passara (Thailand) S Tancharoen	9	8	11	11	11	3
Bye
(Singapore) Chew ZYC (Singapore) Poh SFE
(Thailand) P Tanviriyavechakul (Thailand) P Sanguansin
Bye
(Cambodia) Bun V (Cambodia) Kang Y	7	3	9	0
(Philippines) R Gonzales (Philippines) JR Misal	11	11	11	3
(Malaysia) Leong CF (Malaysia) Ng WSD	8	8	11	13	8	2
(Vietnam) Lê ĐĐ (Vietnam) Đinh AH	11	11	8	11	11	3
Bye
(Singapore) Pang YEK (Singapore) Chua SHJ

Quarterfinal; 17 May 19:30
(Vietnam) Nguyễn AT (Vietnam) Đoàn BTA	9	9	11	9	1
(Malaysia) J Choong (Malaysia) Wong QS	11	11	5	11	3
(Thailand) P Passara (Thailand) S Tancharoen	5	8	7	0
(Singapore) Chew ZYC (Singapore) Poh SFE	11	11	11	3
(Thailand) P Tanviriyavechakul (Thailand) P Sanguansin	11	14	11	3	6	2
(Philippines) R Gonzales (Philippines) JR Misal	6	16	9	11	11	3
(Vietnam) Lê ĐĐ (Vietnam) Đinh AH	6	11	8	7	1
(Singapore) Pang YEK (Singapore) Chua SHJ	11	6	11	11	3

Semifinal; 18 May 11:00
(Malaysia) J Choong (Malaysia) Wong QS	5	8	8
(Singapore) Chew ZYC (Singapore) Poh SFE	11	11	11	3
(Philippines) R Gonzales (Philippines) JR Misal	6	11	8	11	12	3
(Singapore) Pang YEK (Singapore) Chua SHJ	11	8	11	9	10	2

Final; 18 May 16:00
(Singapore) Chew ZYC (Singapore) Poh SFE	5	11	11	12	3
(Philippines) R Gonzales (Philippines) JR Misal	11	8	4	10	1
