= Clarence Chew =

Singaporean table tennis player

Clarence Chew Zhe Yu
Personal information
- Native name: 周哲宇
- Born: 27 December 1995 (age 30) Singapore
- Height: 1.75 m (5 ft 9 in)
- Weight: 60 kg (132 lb)

Sport
- Sport: Table tennis
- Playing style: Left-handed, attacker
- Highest ranking: 123 (May 2022)
- Current ranking: 341 (28 September 2026)
Medal record
Men's Table Tennis
Representing Singapore
Event	1st	2nd	3rd
Commonwealth Games	1	1	2
Southeast Asian Games	4	6	6
South East Asian Championships	11	1	2
Total	16	7	10
Commonwealth Games
Gold medal – first place	2014 Glasgow	Team
Silver medal – second place	2022 Birmingham	Team
Bronze medal – third place	2022 Birmingham	Doubles
Bronze medal – third place	2022 Birmingham	Mixed doubles
Southeast Asian Games
Gold medal – first place	2013 Naypyidaw	Team
Gold medal – first place	2015 Singapore	Team
Gold medal – first place	2023 Cambodia	Team
Gold medal – first place	2021 Vietnam	Doubles
Silver medal – second place	2017 Kuala Lumpur	Singles
Silver medal – second place	2017 Kuala Lumpur	Doubles
Silver medal – second place	2017 Kuala Lumpur	Team
Silver medal – second place	2019 Philippines	Singles
Silver medal – second place	2021 Vietnam	Mixed doubles
Silver medal – second place	2023 Cambodia	Mixed doubles
Bronze medal – third place	2013 Naypyidaw	Singles
Bronze medal – third place	2015 Singapore	Singles
Bronze medal – third place	2015 Singapore	Doubles
Bronze medal – third place	2017 Kuala Lumpur	Mixed doubles
Bronze medal – third place	2021 Vietnam	Singles
Bronze medal – third place	2021 Vietnam	Team
South East Asian Championships
Gold medal – first place	2012 Vientiane	Doubles
Gold medal – first place	2012 Vientiane	Team
Gold medal – first place	2014 Phnom Penh	Doubles
Gold medal – first place	2014 Phnom Penh	Mixed doubles
Gold medal – first place	2016 Makassar	Doubles
Gold medal – first place	2016 Makassar	Mixed doubles
Gold medal – first place	2018 Bali	Singles
Gold medal – first place	2018 Bali	Team
Gold medal – first place	2022 Bangkok	Singles
Gold medal – first place	2022 Bangkok	Doubles
Gold medal – first place	2022 Bangkok	Mixed doubles
Silver medal – second place	2014 Phnom Penh	Team
Bronze medal – third place	2016 Makassar	Team
Bronze medal – third place	2022 Bangkok	Team

Clarence Chew Zhe Yu (born 27 December 1995) is a Singaporean table tennis player. He competed in the 2020 Summer Olympics.

At the 2020 Olympics, Chew competed in the men's singles table tennis event. He won Ibrahima Diaw of Senegal in the first round before losing to the 32nd seed, Daniel Habesohn, of Austria in the second round.

== Career ==
Clarence Chew began his career in 2009 as a national youth player. He made his Southeast Asian Games debut at the 2013 SEA Games. He has represented Singapore at the Youth Olympic Games, Southeast Asian Games, Asian Table Tennis Championships, World Table Tennis Championships, and the Summer Olympic Games

=== 2014 Commonwealth Games ===
Clarence won his first Commonwealth Games Gold medal at the 2014 Commonwealth Games in Glasgow in the Men's Team event. He played alongside Gao Ning, Li Hu, Yang Zi and Zhan Jian.

=== 2020 Summer Olympics ===
Clarence became the first Singapore-born table tennis player to represent the country at the Summer Olympic Games in Tokyo, after winning Koen Pang, in the finals at the Asian Olympic Qualification Tournament in Qatar in March.

Clarence defeated world ranked 71 Ibrahima Diaw of Senegal in the first round with a score of 4–2. He proceeded to the second round where he lost to Austria's Daniel Habesohn.

Singles Event

Date	Round	Result	Opponent	Score	Individual Sets					
24 July	1st	Win	(Senegal) Ibrahima Diaw	4-2	11-4	4-11	11-3	13-11	3-11	12-10
25 July	2nd	Loss	(Austria) Daniel Habesohn	1-4	7-11	9-11	8-11	11-6	10-12	-

=== 2021 Southeast Asian Games ===
Chew, together with teammate Ethan Poh, represented Singapore at the SEA Games in Hanoi, in the Doubles event. In the final, they beat Richard Pugoy Gonzales and John Russel Misal of the Philippines with a score of 3–1. Chew also teamed up with Zeng Jian in the mixed doubles event, clinching a silver after losing in the finals 2–3 to teammates Koen Pang and Wong Xin Ru. Later, in the Men's Singles event, Chew lost 1–4 in the semi-finals to Vietnam's Nguyen Duc Tuan, hence ending the nation's 15 year streak's gold medal haul from 2007 to 2022.
