= Sepak raga =

Traditional Indonesian and Malaysian sport

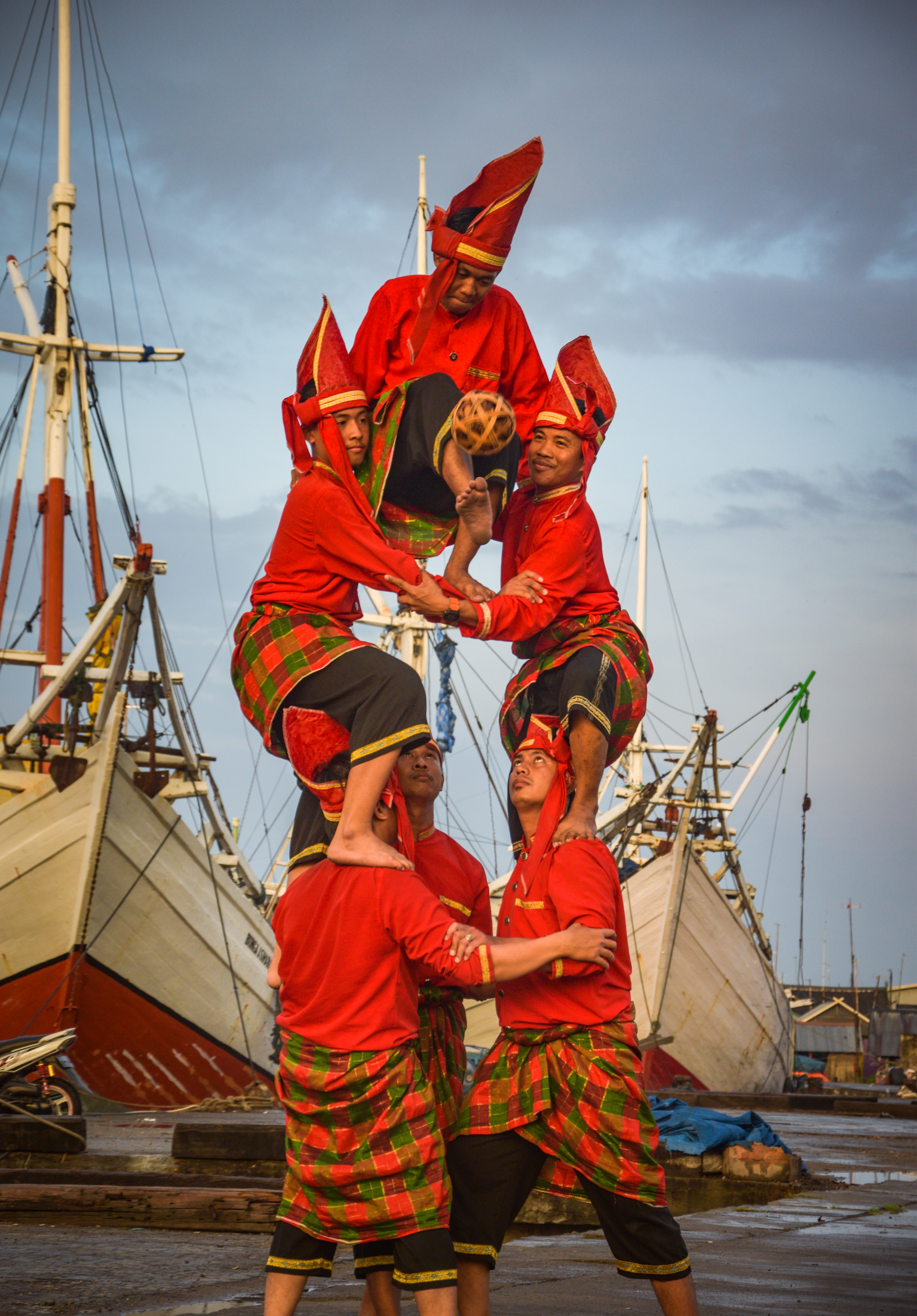
- Paraga or Maraga, the Bugis and Makassar version of sepak raga
- First played: Nusantara Archipelago

Characteristics
- Contact: None
- Team members: Varies
- Type: Indoor and Outdoor
- Equipment: rattan ball, synthetic rubberised plastic

Presence
- Country or region: Malaysia
- Olympic: No

Sepak raga (Minangkabau: sipak rago) is a traditional Indonesian and Malaysian sport, developed in the Malay Archipelago. This game is related to the modern sepak takraw. Similar games include footbag net, footvolley, bossaball and jianzi.

This game is played by five to ten people by forming a circle in an open field, where the sports ball is played with the feet and certain techniques so that the ball moves from one player to another without falling to the ground. The raga ball is made from young coconut leaves or rattan bark which is woven by hand. The sport requires speed, agility and ball control.

The tradition of sepak raga is found in various regions in Nusantara archipelago, including West Sumatra: sipak rago; Riau and North Sumatra: rago tinggi; Java: sepak tengkong; Central Kalimantan: sepak sawut; Sulawesi: paraga. It is also found in the Malay Peninsula region, including Johor, Penang and Pahang.

== History ==
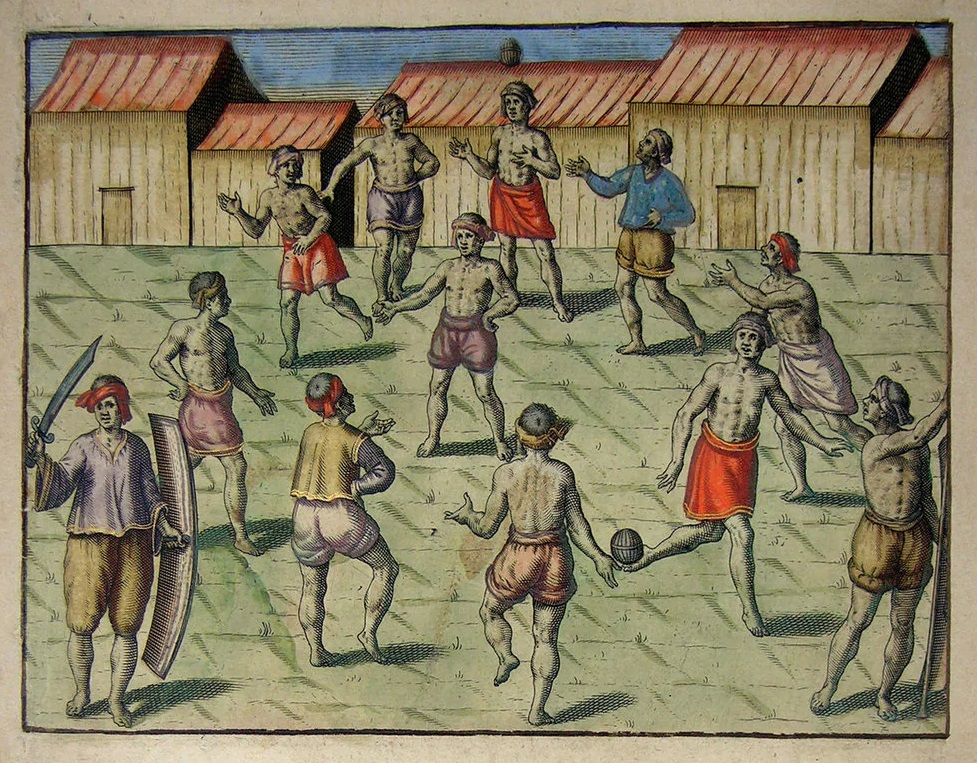
A ballgame called "Keeping the ball aloft", Banda, 1601. The ball is made of twisted branches.

Sepak takraw is known by the Indonesian and Malaysian people in several areas such as Borneo, the Malay Peninsula, Sumatra and Sulawesi as Sepak raga, which is a game for local children who still use a ball made of rattan. In this game, each player must show proficiency in ball handling: the player plays a rattan ball with all limbs except with the hands such as feet, thighs, chest, shoulders, head, and must ensure that the ball does not fall to the ground. The development of sepaktakraw in Asian countries, especially Southeast Asia, has been familiar with the game using rattan balls for a long time.

== Variation ==
=== Indonesia ===
==== Minangkabau ====
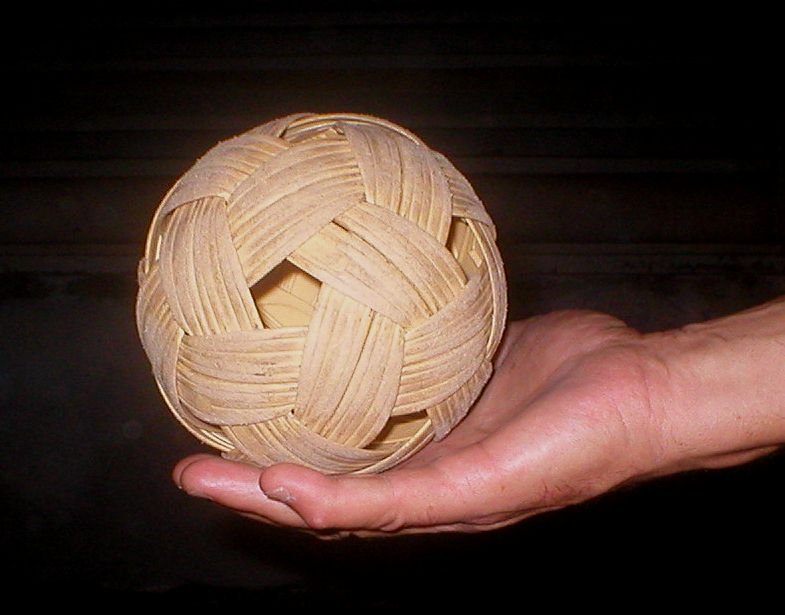
Sepak raga ball made of rattan

Sepak rago or Sipak rago is a traditional game from the Indonesian provinces of West Sumatra. The game of Sepak rago is generally played at nagari ceremonies. Played by boys with 9 players. The equipment used is a ball made of woven rattan with a diameter of 15 cm. The game is played in an open field by making a circle with a diameter of 4.5 m. Then divided into 9 sectors by giving a sign. The players stand in their respective sectors and one in the middle divides the ball. Both receiving and giving the ball must be through a kick.

The match is divided into two stages, namely the preliminary round is called the trot and the final round is called boko. Assessment is made of the technique and style of kicking the ball which is called renten. The duration of galloping games is 15 minutes, while Boko is 30 minutes. This can be extended if deemed necessary by the referee.

In ancient times, the game of football was played by young people in the villages (Nagari) in the afternoon to fill their spare time and as a means of entertainment. There is no standard assessment on this game, because this game is not contested. There is only an assessment of the player's skill in playing the ball so that it doesn't fall to the ground. Nowadays, this game can still be found in the suburbs of Padang and also in other areas in West Sumatra, but in urban areas it is starting to be abandoned by the community. Lately, the game of sepak rago has begun to be competed and many association football groups have started to appear.

==== Bugis-Makassar ====
Paraga, Ma’raga, or A’raga is a traditional game from the Indonesian provinces of South Sulawesi. Paraga is usually played by men, given the complex movements of the paraga and is an agility training movement.

At first glance, the paraga ball is almost similar to the takraw ball because of the shape of the ball and the ball material made of rattan. However, what makes the difference between Sepak Takraw and Paraga is that if the takraw balls are only arranged in one layer of rattan, the paraga balls are arranged in three layers.

Usually in paraga there are six dancers and four music players. All of them have their respective duties to harmonize with one another. One of the elements that must be practiced in this sport is the balance that becomes the capital to process the ball in such a way. Especially in a compound movement formation that relies on teamwork so that the ball remains in their control.

Pa'sapu or head belt that is characteristic of the clothes worn by paraga players. The head belt is covered with starch to keep it upright when the paraga players work the ball. The clothes that the paragons wear are called the Bela clothes, while the musicians wear closed suits. The paragons typically also wear bugis silk sarong or so-called lipa sabbe to complement their appearance. Usually, bright colored clothes will be chosen to attract the attention of the audience.

Togetherness, strong determination, and mutual cooperation make the paraga players not just play. There are special values that are taught not only for the players but also for the audience.

=== Malaysia ===
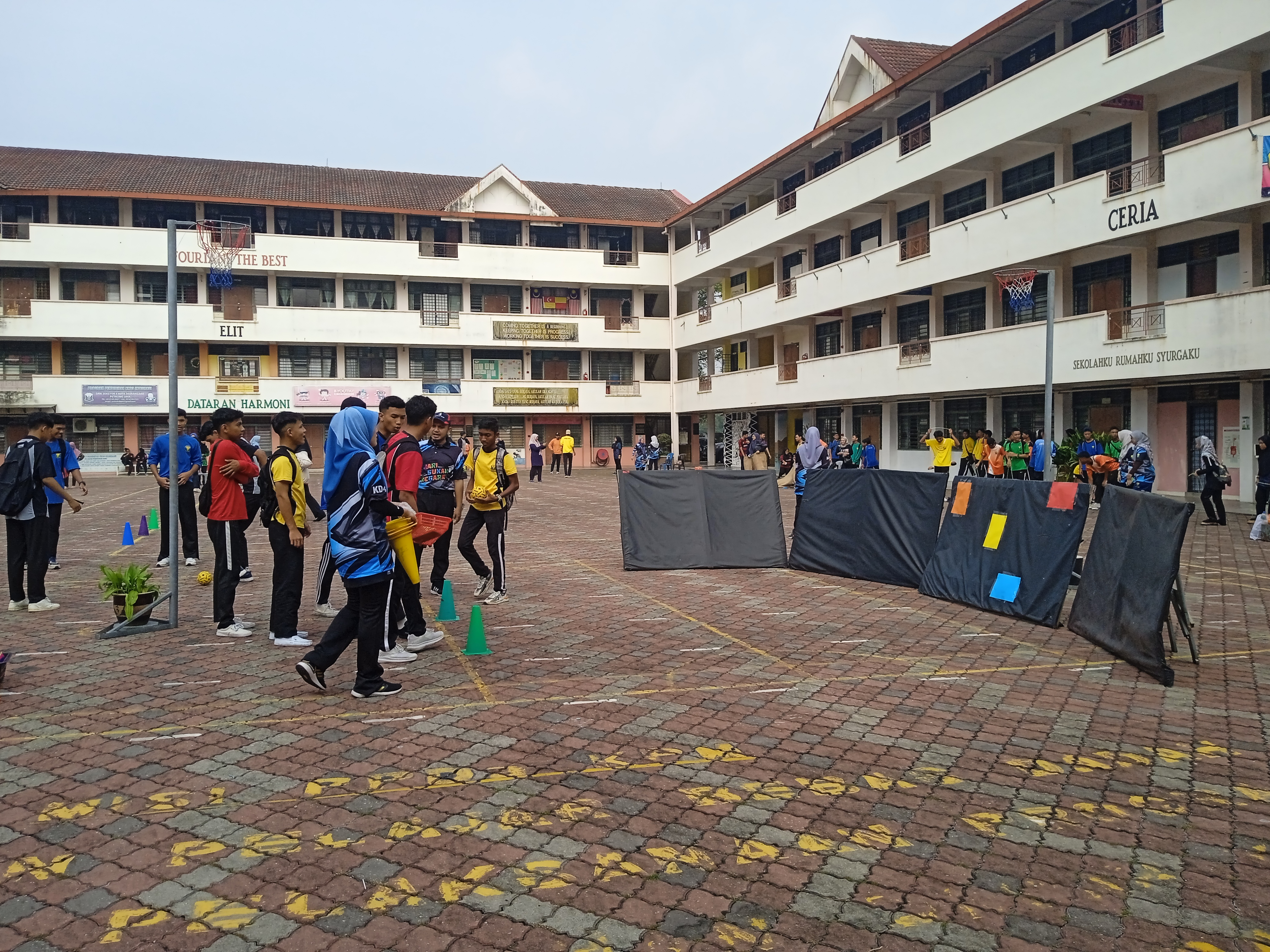
Sepak raga, 2023

In the days of the Malacca Sultanate, in addition to being played by the nobility, commoners also fond of this game. According to Malay Annals, Raja Muhammad, prince of Sultan Mansor Shah Muhammad dated Tanjak due to exposure to kick the ball out of Tun Besar.

In this millennium, the game of sepak takraw is very famous and well known, not only in Malaysia but also in other countries. Sepak takraw, also known as Sepak raga, is a traditional game that has been played since the time of the Sultanate of Malacca in 1478. The actual origins of this game cannot be given as much history has been destroyed as a result of the second world war. With the passage of time and the growing interest in this game throughout Malaya, then at the end of 1945 a new and modern rule of using nets was created by the players in Penang. With the creation of this method, it is undeniable that Penang is the original place where sepak raga started using nets which is now known as sepak takraw.

To showcase for the first time this new way of playing, for the efforts of, among others, En. Mohamed bin Abdul Rahman, En. Abdul Hamid Mydin and En. Yacob Syed, in early 1946 a show game between the Jalan Hatin team and the Patanai Road team was held at the Veterinary Hospital Court, Penang with such a response although considered odd. From Penang and in 1946 also this netball has spread to Alor Star, to Kampung Baru in Kuala Lumpur and then to Singapore.

Since that development team after team has been established and on 25 June 1960, the Malayan Football Federation was inaugurated at a conference pioneered by the Penang Football Association. The federation, which was first established, has appointed Y. Bhg Tan Sri Khir Johari as the President. The immediate action taken by the federation was to enact and compile the existing netball laws at the time by a sub-committee consisting of representatives of the current PSM General Secretary.

== See also ==
- Sepak takraw
- Sport in Indonesia
