= Sportstars =

Indonesian sports television channel

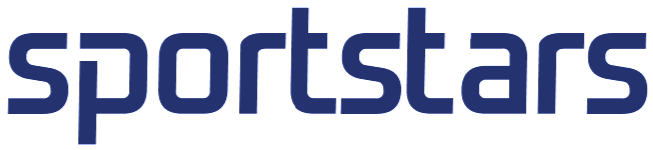
- Country: Indonesia

Ownership
- Owner: MNC Media
- Parent: MVN/iNews Media Group
- Sister channels: IDX Channel; Sindonews TV; Soccer Channel

History
- Launched: 5 September 2005 (as Vision 1 The Football Channel); 2 November 2011 (relaunched as MNC Sports); 1 July 2023 (relaunched as Sportstars)

Links
- Website: www.mncchannels.com/micro/MNC-Sport

Sportstars, formerly known as MNC Sports, is an Indonesian satellite and cable sports television channel owned by Media Nusantara Citra through MVN and iNews Media Group. The in-house channel was launched on 5 September 2005, making it considered as the first sports channel in the country. The channel is available on satellite providers Indovision and K-Vision, as well as MNC Play, and Vision+.

== History ==
Vision 1 The Football Channel logo

Vision 1 The Football Channel (later Vision 1 Sports) began on 5 September 2005. At first, Vision 1 – which can be seen through the channel 1 Indovision, only broadcast football games from around the world live. Since August 2007, it also presented impressions of extreme sports and badminton.

In each match live, broadcast was done directly from the studio to bring Vision1 with the presenter and commentator for the match to guide the way.

On 2 November 2011, Vision 1 Sports was rebranded into MNC Sports.

On 1 July 2023, MNC Sports was rebranded into Sportstars.

== Current Programming ==
- BWF World Tour (Indonesia Masters Super 500 and Open Super 1000 only (2025 onwards); shared with SPOTV (selected tournaments in 2022-2024) and exclusive coverage (2025 onwards))
- PBSI (2026-present for National circuits and championships)
- FFI
  - Indonesia Pro Futsal League
  - Indonesia Nusantara Futsal League
  - FFI Championship
- Formula E (licensed from SPOTV)
- NASCAR (exclusive in 2025 only, licensed from SPOTV in 2026)
- OCA
  - Asian Games (2014-present, exclude 2018)
  - Asian Youth Games (2025)
  - Asian Indoor and Martial Arts Games (2026)
- Asian Para Games (2026)
- Southeast Asian Games (2011, 2019 until 2025)
- ASEAN Para Games (2025)
- FIBA
  - FIBA World Olympic Qualifying Tournament
  - FIBA U-17 World Cup (2024-present)
  - FIBA U-17 Women's World Cup (2024-present)
  - FIBA Asia Cup (2022-present)
- Hexagon Cup (2025-present) (co-licensed with DAZN, SPOTV, and LaLiga+)

=== Football (as Soccer Channel) ===
- FIFA World Cup qualification (AFC, UEFA (2016 until 2017 and 2025 until 2026), and CONMEBOL)
- AFC
  - AFC Asian Cup
  - AFC U-23 Asian Cup
  - AFC U-20 Asian Cup
  - AFC U-17 Asian Cup
  - AFC Futsal Asian Cup
  - AFC U-20 Futsal Asian Cup
  - AFC Women's Asian Cup
  - AFC Women's Olympic Qualifying Tournament (final round only)
  - AFC U-20 Women's Asian Cup
  - AFC U-17 Women's Asian Cup
  - AFC Women's Futsal Asian Cup
  - AFC Champions League Elite
  - AFC Champions League Two
  - AFC Challenge League (2025-26)
  - AFC Futsal Club Championship
  - AFC Women's Champions League
- AFF
  - ASEAN Championship (2008 until present)
  - ASEAN Women's Championship (2025-present)
  - ASEAN Club Championship (2024-present)
  - ASEAN Futsal Championship
  - ASEAN Futsal Club Championship
- UEFA (2022-23 until 2027-28)
  - Nations League
  - UEFA Euro (qualifiers and finals tournament until 2028)
- Saudi Professional League (exclusive in 2022-23 only, licensed from SpoTV for 2023-24 until present)
- Saudi King's Cup (exclusive in 2022-23 only, licensed from SpoTV from 2023-24 until present)
- Saudi Super Cup (exclusive in 2022-23 only, licensed from SpoTV from 2023-24 until present)
- DFL
  - Bundesliga
  - DFL Supercup
- DFB Pokal

== Former Programming ==
- 2010 FIFA World Cup
- 2018 FIFA World Cup
- 2023 AFF U-19 Women's Championship
- UEFA (until 2019)
  - national teams
    - UEFA Under-21 Championship (until 2017)
    - UEFA Women's Euro 2017
  - clubs (2015-16 and 2018-19 only, licensed from beIN Sports (2015-16) and (2018-19))
    - UEFA Champions League
    - UEFA Europa League
- LIB (MNC Vision and K-Vision subscribers only)
  - Liga 1 (2014, 2015, 2020 until first half season of 2021-22, back again from week 2 in 2023-24 until week 34 in 2024-25)
  - Liga 2 (2020 until first half season of 2021-22, back again from week 2 in 2023-24 until a final match in 2024-25)
- PSSI (until 2023)
  - Indonesia men's and women's national team qualifiers and friendlies
  - Piala Indonesia
- US Soccer (2023-2025)
  - USMNT friendlies
- J1 League (licensed from SPOTV in 2022)
- K League 1
- K League 2
- Serie A (discontinued)
- La Liga (discontinued)
- RFEF (?-2016, returned again for 2022-23 until 2024-25)
  - Copa del Rey
  - Supercopa de España
- Thai League 1 (exclusive until 2023-24, licensed from SpoTV in 2024-25 season)
- 2023 FIBA World Cup
- NBA
- ATP Tour
- ATP World Tour 500 series
- French Open
- US Open (tennis)
- Volleyball men's and women's Nations Leagues
- 2017 Asian Men's Volleyball Championship
- SEA Volleyball League
- Proliga
