= 2014 South East Asian Table Tennis Championships =

- Date: 1–5 November 2014
- Edition: 9th
- Location: Phnom Penh, Cambodia
- Venue: Booyoung Khmer Taekwondo Centre

Champions

Men's singles
- (Cambodia) Ly Song-Hong

Women's singles
- (Singapore) Lin Ye

Men's doubles
- (Singapore) Clarence Chew / (Singapore) Ethan Poh Shao Feng

Women's doubles
- (Singapore) Lin Ye / (Singapore) Goi Rui Xuan

Mixed doubles
- (Singapore) Clarence Chew / (Singapore) Lin Ye

Men's team
- Cambodia

Women's team
- Singapore
- South East Asian Table Tennis Championships

The 2014 South East Asian Table Tennis Championships were held in Phnom Penh, Cambodia from 1 to 5 November 2014.

== Medal summary ==
=== Medal table ===
* Host nation (Cambodia)

Rank	Nation	Gold	Silver	Bronze	Total
1	Singapore	5	3	2	10
2	Cambodia*	2	0	1	3
Totals (2 entries)		7	3	3	13

- Some medals are unknown

=== Events ===
Event	Gold	Silver	Bronze
Men's singles	(Cambodia) Ly Song-Hong	(Singapore) Chen Feng	
Women's singles	(Singapore) Lin Ye	(Singapore) Isabelle Siyun Li	
Women's singles	(Singapore) Lin Ye	(Singapore) Isabelle Siyun Li	(Singapore) Zhou Yihan
Men's doubles	(Singapore) Clarence Chew (Singapore) Chen Feng		(Cambodia) Ly Song-Hong (Cambodia) Su Kim-Sour
Men's doubles	(Singapore) Clarence Chew (Singapore) Chen Feng		(Singapore) Loy Mean Hean Darren (Singapore) Ethan Poh Shao Feng
Women's doubles	(Singapore) Lin Ye (Singapore) Zhou Yihan		
Mixed doubles	(Singapore) Clarence Chew (Singapore) Zhou Yihan		
Men's team	Cambodia	Singapore; Clarence Chew; Chen Feng; Loy Mean Hean Darren; Lim Edric Zhengjie; Ethan Poh Shao Feng	
Women's team	Singapore; Lin Ye; Zhou Yihan; Isabelle Siyun Li; Zhang Wanling; Lim Zoe Eunice		

- Missing

== See also ==
- Asian Table Tennis Union
- Asian Table Tennis Championships
