= Surfing in Indonesia =

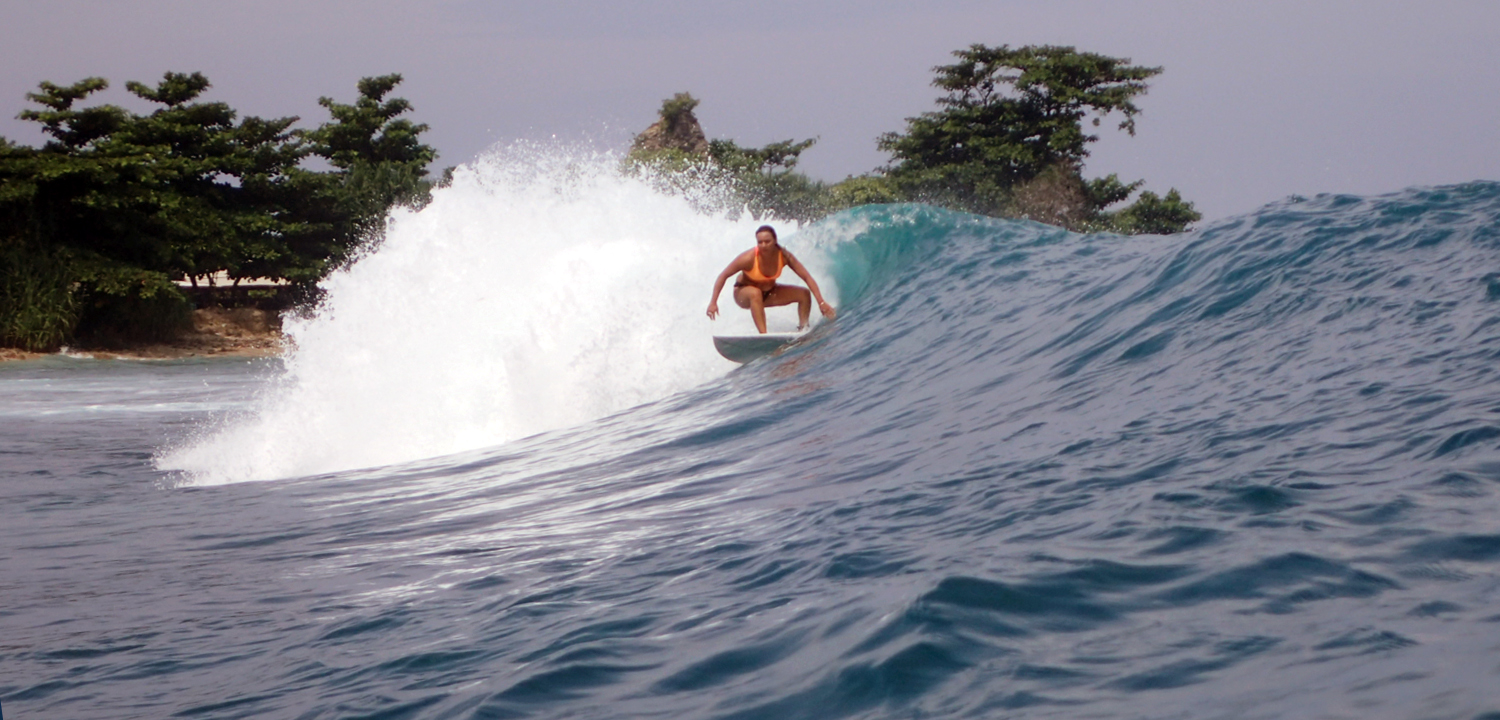
- Bahasa Indonesia: Surfing di Pantai Ciantir, Sawarna, Bayah, Lebak, Banten.
- Country: Indonesia
- National team: Indonesia Olympics team

International competitions
- Summer Olympics

Introduced to Indonesia in the 1930s, surfing now attracts both Indonesian and foreign surfers to numerous locations across the nation.

== History ==
The first surfer in Indonesia was the American Bob Koke who surfed at Kuta Beach in Bali in the mid to late 1930s. In the late 1960s and early 1970s, Indonesian surfing beaches were featured in the 1972 Australian surfing film Morning of the Earth and foreign surfers started coming to Bali. The sport later spread to locations such as Nias Island, G-Land in Java, and the Mentawai Islands.

In 2003, the Indonesian Surfing Championships (ISC) were launched by Tipi Jabrik, with the first edition in 2004 in partnership with Quiksilver.

In 2007, surfing was admitted into the 2007 Asian Beach Games in Bali as a sport by the International Olympic Committee.

In 2008, the ISC gained a partnership with Coca-Cola Amatil Indonesia in 2008. This partnership lasted almost five years, including the creation of the Asian Surfing Championships (ASC) from the success of the ISC.

In 2013, the Rip Curl Cup was staged at Padang Padang (won by Mega Semadhi from Pecatu, Bali), That same year, the Oakley Pro Bali, the 5th stop of the world tour, was staged in Bali.

Indonesia, with its vast coastline and pristine waters, stands as a Mecca for surfers from around the globe.

== Surfing revenue ==
Surfing is a multimillion-dollar Indonesian industry. That includes transportation, accommodation, dining, entertainment, and surfing services and products. Some islands have beach communities that make a living directly from surfing, such as Lakey Peak in Sumbawa, Sorake Beach on Nias Island, and Uluwatu Beach in Bali.

Multinational surfing brands such as Billabong, Quiksilver, and Oakley, Inc. run their Southeast Asia operation and distribution out of their Bali headquarters. Regional governments have held ASC surfing contests to promote their waves and beaches.

It is estimated that the surfing business generates more than half-billion dollars in Bali alone, which represents more than 10% of the amount generated by tourism. Taking into account that the largest part of the surfers in Bali are tourists, surfing can be considered as a major part of tourism in Indonesia.

== Indonesian surfers ==
Rizal Tanjung was the first Indonesian to compete on the World Qualifying Series. He was one of the first Indonesian surfers to travel as a professional surfer. He won the Indonesian Surfing Championship circuit in 2002 and 2006. He was called "The most recognizable Asian surfer alive" by Transworld Surf magazine. He also owns the brands Kurawa and Rizt. Tanjung has appeared in many surfing videos, including Loose Change and Stranger Than Fiction.

Oney Anwar was the first surfer from Sumbawa to compete on the WQS. He learned to surf at Lakey Peak and joined the Rip Curl team when he was 10. He moved to Australia as part of a Rip Curl program for young surfers and came back later in Indonesia. He is now internationally known and looking to qualify for the WCT.

Raditya Rondi has been a top contender in the Asian Surfing Championships since their creation in 2011, and claimed the Open division title in 3 consecutive years.

Rio Waida, resident of Uluwatu, Bali, is a current competitor in the World Surf League. Rio represented Indonesia in surfing at the Summer Olympics in 2020 and 2024.

== Surf spots in Indonesia ==
=== Bali ===
- Padang Padang
- Uluwatu
- Keramas

=== Java ===
Java has many surf spots, including G-Land.

=== Lombok ===
Lombok has several surf locations.

- Gerupuk Inside
- Gerupuk Outside
- Ekas, located opposite the harbour of Awang
- Mawi, near Selong Belanak

=== Mentawai Islands ===
The Mentawai Islands have several surf spots accessible by boat:

- Macaroni, located in North Pagai
- Lance's Right, located in Sipore.
- Lance's Left, located near Lance's Right

=== Panaitan Islands ===
On Panaitan, people surf at One Palm Point and Apocalypse.

=== Sumatra ===
In Sumatra, Krui is a surf beach located at 5°11′0″S 103°56′0″E.

=== Sumbawa ===
The most famous surf posts on Sumbawa are Lakey Peak and Scar Reef.
