= 2010 South East Asian Table Tennis Championships =

- Date: 12–15 December 2010
- Edition: 9th
- Location: Makati, Philippines

Champions

Women's singles
- Vietnam

Women's doubles
- Malaysia / Malaysia

Men's team
- Vietnam
- South East Asian Table Tennis Championships

The 2010 South East Asian Table Tennis Championships were held in Makati, Metro Manila, Philippines from 12 to 15 December 2010.

== Medal summary ==
=== Medal table ===
Rank	Nation	Gold	Silver	Bronze	Total
1	Vietnam	2	0	0	2
2	Malaysia	1	2	3	6
3	Singapore	0	1	2	3
4	Indonesia	0	1	0	1
5	Thailand	0	0	2	2
Totals (5 entries)		3	4	7	14

- Missing

=== Events ===
Event	Gold	Silver	Bronze
Men's singles	[[]]	[[]]	Thailand
Men's singles	[[]]	[[]]	(Malaysia) Muhd Shakirin Ibrahim
Women's singles	Vietnam	(Malaysia) Beh Lee Wei	Thailand
Women's singles	Vietnam	(Malaysia) Beh Lee Wei	[[]]
Men's doubles	[[]]	[[]]	(Singapore) Pang Xuejie (Singapore) Ma Liang
Men's doubles	[[]]	[[]]	[[]]
Women's doubles	(Malaysia) Beh Lee Wei (Malaysia) Ng Sock Khim	Indonesia; Indonesia	[[]]
Women's doubles	(Malaysia) Beh Lee Wei (Malaysia) Ng Sock Khim	Indonesia; Indonesia	[[]]
Mixed doubles	[[]]	[[]]	(Malaysia) Chai Kian Beng (Malaysia) Ng Sock Khim
Mixed doubles	[[]]	[[]]	[[]]
Men's team	Vietnam	Singapore; Ma Liang; Pang Xuejie; Chew Zhe Yu Clarence; Tay Jit Kiat	Malaysia; Muhd Shakirin Ibrahim; Kho Mao Sheng; Chai Kian Beng
Men's team	Vietnam	Singapore; Ma Liang; Pang Xuejie; Chew Zhe Yu Clarence; Tay Jit Kiat	[[]]
Women's team	[[]]	Malaysia; Beh Lee Wei; Ng Sock Khim; Fan Xiao Jun	Singapore; Sim Kai Xin Zena; Chau Hai Qing; Lam Tengsi; Yee Herng Hwee
Women's team	[[]]	Malaysia; Beh Lee Wei; Ng Sock Khim; Fan Xiao Jun	[[]]

- Missing

== See also ==
- Asian Table Tennis Union
- Asian Table Tennis Championships
