= 2012 South East Asian Table Tennis Championships =

- Date: 10–14 December 2012
- Edition: 8th
- Location: Vientiane, Laos

Champions

Men's singles
- (Singapore) Li Hu

Women's singles
- (Singapore) Yu Mengyu

Men's doubles
- (Singapore) Li Hu / (Singapore) Clarence Chew

Women's doubles
- (Thailand) Nanthana Komwong / (Thailand) Anisara Muangsuk

Mixed doubles
- (Singapore) Li Hu / (Singapore) Yu Mengyu

Men's team
- Singapore

Women's team
- (Thailand) Singapore
- South East Asian Table Tennis Championships

The 2012 South East Asian Table Tennis Championships were held in Vientiane, Laos from 10 to 14 December 2012.

== Medal summary ==
=== Medal table ===
Rank	Nation	Gold	Silver	Bronze	Total
1	Singapore	5	2	2	9
2	Thailand	2	1	1	4
3	Vietnam	0	2	7	9
4	Indonesia	0	2	3	5
5	Malaysia	0	0	1	1
Totals (5 entries)		7	7	14	28

=== Events ===
Event	Gold	Silver	Bronze
Men's singles	(Singapore) Lin Hu	(Vietnam) Dinh Quang Linh	(Vietnam) Tran Tuan Quynh
Men's singles	(Singapore) Lin Hu	(Vietnam) Dinh Quang Linh	(Vietnam) Dao Duy Hoang
Women's singles	(Singapore) Yu Mengyu	(Thailand) Nanthana Komwong	(Vietnam) Mai Hoang My Trang
Women's singles	(Singapore) Yu Mengyu	(Thailand) Nanthana Komwong	(Vietnam) Nguyen Thi Viet Linh
Men's doubles	(Singapore) Li Hu (Singapore) Clarence Chew	(Singapore) Ma Liang (Singapore) Pang Xuejie	(Vietnam) Tran Tuan Quynh (Vietnam) Dinh Quang Ling
Men's doubles	(Singapore) Li Hu (Singapore) Clarence Chew	(Singapore) Ma Liang (Singapore) Pang Xuejie	(Indonesia) Yon Mardiyono (Indonesia) Gilang Maulana
Women's doubles	(Thailand) Nanthana Komwong (Thailand) Anisara Muangsuk	(Indonesia) Noor Azizah (Indonesia) Fauziah Yulianti	(Singapore) Yu Mengyu (Singapore) Li Isabelle Siyun
Women's doubles	(Thailand) Nanthana Komwong (Thailand) Anisara Muangsuk	(Indonesia) Noor Azizah (Indonesia) Fauziah Yulianti	(Singapore) Sim Kai Xin Zena (Singapore) Yee Herng Hwee
Mixed doubles	(Singapore) Li Hu (Singapore) Yu Mengyu	(Vietnam) Dinh Quang Linh (Vietnam) Mai Hoang My Trang	(Indonesia) Gilang Maulana (Indonesia) Noor Azizah
Mixed doubles	(Singapore) Li Hu (Singapore) Yu Mengyu	(Vietnam) Dinh Quang Linh (Vietnam) Mai Hoang My Trang	(Indonesia) Ficky Supit Santoso (Indonesia) Fauziah Yulianti
Men's team	Singapore; Li Hu; Clarence Chew; Pang Xuejie; Ma Liang	Indonesia	Thailand
Men's team	Singapore; Li Hu; Clarence Chew; Pang Xuejie; Ma Liang	Indonesia	Vietnam
Women's team	Thailand	Singapore; Sim Kai Xin Zena; Yu Mengyu; Li Siyun Isabelle; Yee Herng Hwee	Malaysia
Women's team	Thailand	Singapore; Sim Kai Xin Zena; Yu Mengyu; Li Siyun Isabelle; Yee Herng Hwee	Vietnam

== See also ==
- Asian Table Tennis Union
- Asian Table Tennis Championships
