= 2018 South East Asian Table Tennis Championships =

- Date: 15–18 November 2018
- Edition: 11th
- Location: Bali, Indonesia
- Venue: Merpati Sport stadium

Champions

Men's singles
- (Singapore) Clarence Chew

Women's singles
- (Singapore) Goi Rui Xuan

Men's doubles
- (Singapore) Koen Pang Yew En / (Singapore) Ethan Poh Shao Feng

Women's doubles
- (Malaysia) Karen Lyne Anak Dick / (Malaysia) Ho Ying

Mixed doubles
- (Singapore) Koen Pang Yew En / (Singapore) Goi Rui Xuan

Men's team
- Singapore

Women's team
- Malaysia
- South East Asian Table Tennis Championships

The 2018 South East Asian Table Tennis Championships were held in Bali, Indonesia from 15 to 18 November 2018.

== Medal summary ==
=== Medal table ===
* Host nation (Indonesia)

Rank	Nation	Gold	Silver	Bronze	Total
1	Singapore	5	4	7	16
2	Malaysia	2	2	0	4
3	Thailand	0	1	1	2
4	Philippines	0	0	4	4
5	Indonesia*	0	0	2	2
Totals (5 entries)		7	7	14	28

=== Events ===
Event	Gold	Silver	Bronze
Men's singles	(Singapore) Clarence Chew	(Singapore) Koen Pang Yew En	(Singapore) Ethan Poh Shao Feng
Men's singles	(Singapore) Clarence Chew	(Singapore) Koen Pang Yew En	(Singapore) Lucas Tan
Women's singles	(Singapore) Goi Rui Xuan	(Singapore) Wong Xin Ru	(Singapore) Pearlyn Koh Kai Xin
Women's singles	(Singapore) Goi Rui Xuan	(Singapore) Wong Xin Ru	(Singapore) Eunice Lim Zoe
Men's doubles	(Singapore) Koen Pang Yew En (Singapore) Ethan Poh Shao Feng	(Malaysia) Leong Chee Feng (Malaysia) Wong Qi Shen	(Indonesia) Deepash Bhagwani (Indonesia) Rahmat Pakaya
Men's doubles	(Singapore) Koen Pang Yew En (Singapore) Ethan Poh Shao Feng	(Malaysia) Leong Chee Feng (Malaysia) Wong Qi Shen	(Singapore) Lucas Tan (Singapore) Gerald Yu Zong Jun
Women's doubles	(Malaysia) Karen Lyne Anak Dick (Malaysia) Ho Ying	(Singapore) Pearlyn Koh Kai Xin (Singapore) Tan En Hui	(Philippines) Rose Jean Fadol (Philippines) Sendrina Andrea Balatbat
Women's doubles	(Malaysia) Karen Lyne Anak Dick (Malaysia) Ho Ying	(Singapore) Pearlyn Koh Kai Xin (Singapore) Tan En Hui	(Singapore) Goi Rui Xuan (Singapore) Wong Xin Ru
Mixed doubles	(Singapore) Koen Pang Yew En (Singapore) Goi Rui Xuan	(Singapore) Ethan Poh Shao Feng (Singapore) Wong Xin Ru	(Philippines) Emy Rose Dael (Philippines) Ryan Jacolo
Mixed doubles	(Singapore) Koen Pang Yew En (Singapore) Goi Rui Xuan	(Singapore) Ethan Poh Shao Feng (Singapore) Wong Xin Ru	(Philippines) Elijah Chars Johan Yamson (Philippines) Jamaica Dianne Sy
Men's team	Singapore; Clarence Chew; Ethan Poh Shao Feng; Gerald Yu Zong Jun; Koen Pang Yew En; Lucas Tan	Malaysia; Leong Chee Feng; Wong Qi Shen; Christopher Goh	Indonesia
Men's team	Singapore; Clarence Chew; Ethan Poh Shao Feng; Gerald Yu Zong Jun; Koen Pang Yew En; Lucas Tan	Malaysia; Leong Chee Feng; Wong Qi Shen; Christopher Goh	Thailand; Vevakultawan Purit; Tananan Tantakool; Thyme Sanglertsilpachai
Women's team	Malaysia; Alice Chang Sian; Ho Ying; Karen Lyne Anak Dick	Thailand	Philippines; Jamaica Sy; Rose Jean Fadol; Emy Rose Dael; Serendrina Balatbat
Women's team	Malaysia; Alice Chang Sian; Ho Ying; Karen Lyne Anak Dick	Thailand	Singapore; Eunice Lim Zoe; Goi Rui Xuan; Pearlyn Koh Kai Xin; Tan En Hui; Wong Xin Ru

== See also ==
- Asian Table Tennis Union
- Asian Table Tennis Championships
