= 2016 South East Asian Table Tennis Championships =

South East Asian Table Tennis Championships

- Date: 21–24 December 2016
- Edition: 10th
- Location: Makassar, Indonesia

Champions

Men's singles
- (Vietnam) Nguyen Anh Tu

Women's singles
- (Singapore) Lin Ye

Men's doubles
- (Singapore) Clarence Chew / (Singapore) Ethan Poh Shao Feng

Women's doubles
- (Singapore) Lin Ye / (Singapore) Goi Rui Xuan

Mixed doubles
- (Singapore) Clarence Chew / (Singapore) Lin Ye

Men's team
- Vietnam

Women's team
- Vietnam
- South East Asian Table Tennis Championships

The 2016 South East Asian Table Tennis Championships were held in Makassar, Indonesia from 21 to 24 December 2016.

== Medal summary ==
=== Medal table ===
* Host nation (Indonesia)

Rank	Nation	Gold	Silver	Bronze	Total
1	Singapore	4	2	3	9
2	Vietnam	3	2	4	9
3	Indonesia*	0	3	4	7
4	Malaysia	0	0	3	3
Totals (4 entries)		7	7	14	28

=== Events ===
Event	Gold	Silver	Bronze
Men's singles	(Vietnam) Nguyen Anh Tu	(Singapore) Ethan Poh Shao Feng	(Vietnam) Doan Ba Thuan Anh
Men's singles	(Vietnam) Nguyen Anh Tu	(Singapore) Ethan Poh Shao Feng	(Vietnam) Dinh Quang Linh
Women's singles	(Singapore) Lin Ye	(Vietnam) Mai Hoang My Trang	(Singapore) Zhang Wan Ling
Women's singles	(Singapore) Lin Ye	(Vietnam) Mai Hoang My Trang	(Vietnam) Nguyen Thi Viet Linh
Men's doubles	(Singapore) Clarence Chew (Singapore) Ethan Poh Shao Feng	(Vietnam) Dinh Quang Linh (Vietnam) Nguyen Anh Tu	(Indonesia) Gilang Maulana (Indonesia) Ficky Supit Santoso
Men's doubles	(Singapore) Clarence Chew (Singapore) Ethan Poh Shao Feng	(Vietnam) Dinh Quang Linh (Vietnam) Nguyen Anh Tu	(Singapore) Tay Ming Han Maxxe (Singapore) Lim Zheng Jie Edric
Women's doubles	(Singapore) Lin Ye (Singapore) Goi Rui Xuan	(Indonesia) Lilis Indriani (Indonesia) Gustin Dwijayanti	(Indonesia) Hawwa Kharisma Nur (Indonesia) Azhari Hani Tri
Women's doubles	(Singapore) Lin Ye (Singapore) Goi Rui Xuan	(Indonesia) Lilis Indriani (Indonesia) Gustin Dwijayanti	(Vietnam) Nguyen Thi Viet Linh (Vietnam) Phan Hoang Tuong Giang
Mixed doubles	(Singapore) Clarence Chew (Singapore) Lin Ye	(Indonesia) Ficky Supit Santoso (Indonesia) Gustin Dwijayanti	(Indonesia) Gilang Maulana (Indonesia) Lilis Indriani
Mixed doubles	(Singapore) Clarence Chew (Singapore) Lin Ye	(Indonesia) Ficky Supit Santoso (Indonesia) Gustin Dwijayanti	(Malaysia) Haiqal Muhamad Ashraf (Malaysia) Lee Rou You
Men's team	Vietnam	Indonesia	Malaysia
Men's team	Vietnam	Indonesia	Singapore
Women's team	Vietnam	Singapore	Indonesia
Women's team	Vietnam	Singapore	Malaysia

== See also ==
- Asian Table Tennis Union
- Asian Table Tennis Championships
