= South East Asian Table Tennis Championships =

Tournament information
- Sport: Table tennis
- Location: South East Asia
- Established: 1998
- Administrator: SEATTA, ATTU, & ITTF
- Tournament format(s): Singles; Doubles; Team

The South East Asian Table Tennis Championships is a biennial table tennis tournament regarded as a regional championships by International Table Tennis Federation (ITTF). From 1998, the tournament was organised by the Asian Table Tennis Union (ATTU) and South East Asian Table Tennis Association(SEATTA).

== Editions ==
=== South East Asian Table Tennis Championships ===
Edition	Year	Host city	Events
1	1998	Bangkok, Thailand	7
2	2000	Kuala Lumpur, Malaysia	7
3	2002	Karawaci, Tangerang, Indonesia	7
4	2004	Ho Chi Minh City, Vietnam	7
5	2006	Singapore, Singapore	7
6	2008	Jakarta, Indonesia	7
7	2010	Makati, Philippines	7
8	2012	Vientiane, Laos	7
9	2014	Phnom Penh, Cambodia	7
10	2016	Makassar, Indonesia	7
11	2018	Bali, Indonesia	7
12	2022	Bangkok, Thailand	7
12	2024	Nonthaburi, Thailand	7

== Results of Individual and Team Events ==
=== Medal table (2010 - Now) ===
Rank	Nation	Gold	Silver	Bronze	Total
1	Singapore	22	14	22	58
2	Thailand	6	5	6	17
3	Vietnam	5	5	11	21
4	Malaysia	3	4	7	14
5	Cambodia	2	0	1	3
6	Indonesia	0	6	12	18
7	Philippines	0	0	4	4
8	Brunei	0	0	0	0
8	Laos	0	0	0	0
8	Myanmar	0	0	0	0
Totals (10 entries)		38	34	63	135

- Some medals of 2010 & 2014 are unknown

== See also ==
- World Table Tennis Championships
- Asian Table Tennis Championships
- Asian Table Tennis Union
- List of table tennis players
