= Indonesia Women's Pro Futsal League =

Women league for futsal in Indonesia

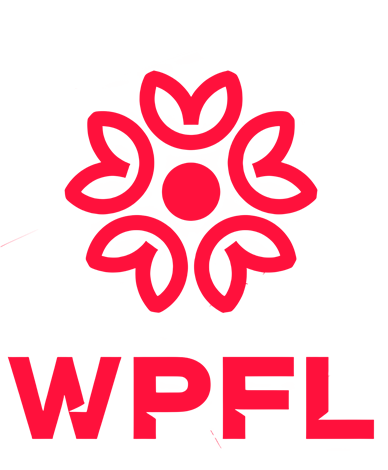
- Organising body: KFI
- Founded: 2012
- Country: Indonesia
- Confederation: AFC (Asia)
- Number of clubs: 9
- Level on pyramid: 1
- Relegation to: Nusantara Women's Futsal League
- International cup: AFF Futsal Club Championship
- Current champions: Kuda Laut Nusantara Angels (1 title) (2026)
- Most championships: UPI Bandung (3 titles)
- Broadcaster(s): MNCTV, iNews, Sportstars
- Website: https://pflindonesia.com/
- Current: 2026 Indonesia Women's Pro Futsal League

Indonesia Women's Pro Futsal League (Indonesian: Liga Futsal Profesional Wanita Indonesia) is the top league for women's futsal at the national level in Indonesia. It is organized by the Indonesian Futsal Federation (FFI) and operated by Kompetisi Futsal Indonesia (KFI). This competition began in the 2012–2013 season as Liga Futsal Wanita Indonesia (LFWI) or the Indonesian Women's Futsal League. This competition was held in conjunction with its men's equivalent, the Indonesia Pro Futsal League. The league's name was changed to its current form before the 2016 season began.

Starting from the 2026 season, the WPFL adopted a closed-league system, with club participation determined through managerial, financial, technical, and legal evaluations by FFI. The league also introduced a new format adding a final four and grand final stage following the regular season.

In addition to crowning the best women's futsal club champion, this competition also serves as a selection event for the Indonesia women's national futsal team.

== Teams ==
The following 9 clubs will compete in the Indonesia Women's Pro Futsal League during the 2026 season.

Team	City	Province
MSP	Tangerang	Banten
Kuda Laut Nusantara Angels	Jakarta	Jakarta
Kebumen Angels	Kebumen	Central Java
Netic Ladies	Bogor	West Java
Mojang Bandung	Bandung	West Java
NAM ABP Women	Surakarta	Central Java
Dragon Kuning Ladies	Pekanbaru	Riau
Capybara Angel	Karawang	West Java
F45T Angels	Semarang	Central Java

== Champions ==
Season	Champions	Runners-up	Third place	Ref.
2012–13	Putri Mataram FC Sleman	Pansa FC Bantul	Tifosi Alonza FC	
2015	UPI Antam Bandung	Netic Ladies FC Cibinong	Cosmir UNJ FC Jakarta	
2016	Jaya Kencana Angels FC	UPI Antam Bandung	Netic Ladies FC Cibinong	
2017	UPI Bandung	Jaya Kencana Angels FC	Lampung Angels FC	
2018	UPI Bandung	Kebumen United Angels FC	Jaya Kencana Angels FC	
2019	Kebumen United Angels FC	UPI Bandung	Jaya Kencana Pusaka FC	
2020	Persiba Female FC Balikpapan	Pusaka Angels FC Kendal	Kebumen United Angels FC	
2021–22	Pusaka Angels FC Kendal	Putri Sumatera Selatan FC	Kebumen Angels FC	
2022–23	Pusaka Angels FC Kendal	Kebumen Angels	Muara Enim United	
2023–24	Kebumen Angels	MS Putri Bersatu	Muara Enim United	
2025	MS Putri Bersatu	Kuda Laut Nusantara Angels	Alive Lubuk Linggau	
2026	Kuda Laut Nusantara Angels	MSP	Capybara Angel; NAM ABP Women	
