= Indonesia Futsal Federation =

National sports federation

- Federasi Futsal Indonesia
- Sport: Futsal
- Jurisdiction: National
- Abbreviation: FFI
- Founded: 22 June 2014; 12 years ago (as Asosiasi Futsal Indonesia); 20 November 2015; 10 years ago (renamed to FFI)
- Headquarters: Jakarta
- Chairman: Michael Sianipar

Official website
- futsalindonesia.org

The Indonesia Futsal Federation (Indonesian: Federasi Futsal Indonesia; abbreviated as FFI) is the governing body of futsal in Indonesia and a member association of Indonesia's football governing body, PSSI. It was founded on 22 June 2014. FFI regulates the activities of the Indonesian men's and women's national futsal teams. It also runs the Indonesian Professional Futsal League competition for both men and women.

== History ==
FFI was founded on 22 June 2014 at the Indonesia Futsal Congress held by PSSI as the Indonesia Futsal Association (Indonesian: Asosiasi Futsal Indonesia; abbreviated as AFI). FFI is the successor to the National Futsal Body (Indonesian: Badan Futsal Nasional; abbreviated as BFN) which was later dissolved by PSSI in 2014. On the next day, Hary Tanoesoedibjo was elected as AFI's chairman.

AFI then changed its name to Federasi Futsal Indonesia (FFI) after its first congress on 20 November 2015.

== Chairman ==
No	Name	Start job title	End job title
1	Hary Tanoesoedibjo	2014	2024
2	Michael Sianipar	2024	present

== FFI competitions ==
One of the purpose of FFI is to regulate and to run the Indonesian Professional Futsal League competition. Ever since 2015, FFI maintains two levels of national futsal leagues, namely:

- Professional level
  - Indonesia Pro Futsal League
  - Indonesia Pro Futsal League 2
  - Indonesia Women's Pro Futsal League
- Amateur/semi-pro level
  - Nusantara Futsal League
  - Nusantara Women's Futsal League

The pro level is under the direct control of FFI while amateur/semi-pro level is under the supervision of local and provincial futsal associations.

FFI also organizes the FFI U20 Futsal Championship, a youth men tournament, which was used for selecting members of the Indonesia U20 futsal team.

== National teams ==
While ultimately under the control of PSSI, FFI (Federasi Futsal Indonesia) is the one who regulates the activities of the men's and women's national futsal teams.

- Indonesia national futsal team
- Indonesia national under-20 futsal team
- Indonesia women's national futsal team

== See also ==
- Football Association of Indonesia
