= Judo at the 2025 Asian Youth Games =

- Venue: Exhibition World Bahrain
- Dates: 29–30 October 2025

Judo at the 2025 Asian Youth Games was held in Sakhir, Bahrain from 29 to 30 October 2025 at the Exhibition World Bahrain.

== Medalists ==
=== Boys ===
Event	Gold	Silver	Bronze
−50 kg	Adilzhan Nurbeken; Kazakhstan	Yusuf Zamonov; Tajikistan	Shokhjakhon Usmonov; Uzbekistan
−50 kg	Adilzhan Nurbeken; Kazakhstan	Yusuf Zamonov; Tajikistan	Younes Nasser; Yemen
−55 kg	Abubakr Sattorov; Uzbekistan	Aslan Yergaliyev; Kazakhstan	Abolfazl Nazari; Iran
−55 kg	Abubakr Sattorov; Uzbekistan	Aslan Yergaliyev; Kazakhstan	Mohammed Asiri; Saudi Arabia
−60 kg	Huang Nai-hsuan; Chinese Taipei	Davlatbek Akhrorov; Uzbekistan	Liu Yuhang; China
−60 kg	Huang Nai-hsuan; Chinese Taipei	Davlatbek Akhrorov; Uzbekistan	Sanzhar Abdyldaev; Kyrgyzstan
−66 kg	Bekali Yerken; Kazakhstan	Abdul Bashir Qadiri; Afghanistan	Wang Xu; China
−66 kg	Bekali Yerken; Kazakhstan	Abdul Bashir Qadiri; Afghanistan	Yusuf Skandarzoda; Tajikistan
−73 kg	Mirzohid Khudoykulov; Uzbekistan	Dauletkerey Seifil; Kazakhstan	Harshit; India
−73 kg	Mirzohid Khudoykulov; Uzbekistan	Dauletkerey Seifil; Kazakhstan	Sobhan Hakimi; Iran
−81 kg	Samandar Sunnatov; Uzbekistan	Erlan Kadyrbaev; Kyrgyzstan	Batkhuyagiin Temüülen; Mongolia
−81 kg	Samandar Sunnatov; Uzbekistan	Erlan Kadyrbaev; Kyrgyzstan	Hossein Novin; Iran
−90 kg	Jurabek Eshpulatov; Uzbekistan	Shynggyskhan Tanirbergen; Kazakhstan	Mohammad Barfaraz; Iran
−90 kg	Jurabek Eshpulatov; Uzbekistan	Shynggyskhan Tanirbergen; Kazakhstan	Batjargalyn Möngöndöl; Mongolia
+90 kg	Alibek Durdiev; Uzbekistan	Adilzhan Zhaudinov; Kazakhstan	Sanjaagiin Mönkh-Erdene; Mongolia
+90 kg	Alibek Durdiev; Uzbekistan	Adilzhan Zhaudinov; Kazakhstan	Tian Haoxuan; China

=== Girls ===
Event	Gold	Silver	Bronze
−40 kg	Dilafruz Boltaboeva; Uzbekistan	Bayarzulyn Khulan; Mongolia	Bao Rui-yun; Chinese Taipei
−40 kg	Dilafruz Boltaboeva; Uzbekistan	Bayarzulyn Khulan; Mongolia	Adiya Zhanakhmet; Kazakhstan
−44 kg	Zhao Zihui; China	Alina Kolucheva; Uzbekistan	Shen Shao-yun; Chinese Taipei
−44 kg	Zhao Zihui; China	Alina Kolucheva; Uzbekistan	Inzhu Sakhabadin; Kazakhstan
−48 kg	Mahsa Shakibaei; Iran	Alua Baltabay; Kazakhstan	Enkhtöriin Temügen; Mongolia
−48 kg	Mahsa Shakibaei; Iran	Alua Baltabay; Kazakhstan	Iasemin Talgartbekova; Kyrgyzstan
−52 kg	Fatima Supygaliyeva; Kazakhstan	Milena Borubolotova; Kyrgyzstan	Zuhal Jumaeva; Tajikistan
−52 kg	Fatima Supygaliyeva; Kazakhstan	Milena Borubolotova; Kyrgyzstan	Zuhra Alimova; Uzbekistan
−57 kg	Gulsanam Khazratova; Uzbekistan	Yu Yue; China	Inzhu Zhumazhan; Kazakhstan
−57 kg	Gulsanam Khazratova; Uzbekistan	Yu Yue; China	Phạm Minh Tuyết; Vietnam
−63 kg	Sashenka Fatimah; Indonesia	Monika Devi Khuyenthem; India	Maftuna Akhmedova; Uzbekistan
−63 kg	Sashenka Fatimah; Indonesia	Monika Devi Khuyenthem; India	Azima Serik; Kazakhstan
−70 kg	Aisha Altay; Kazakhstan	Shohista Turaeva; Uzbekistan	Pettanwa Rompho; Thailand
−70 kg	Aisha Altay; Kazakhstan	Shohista Turaeva; Uzbekistan	Khadbaataryn Buyanjargal; Mongolia
+70 kg	Zhang Shuhan; China	Khonzodabegim Usmankulova; Uzbekistan	Batjargalyn Nomuunzayaa; Mongolia
+70 kg	Zhang Shuhan; China	Khonzodabegim Usmankulova; Uzbekistan	Togzhan Tolebay; Kazakhstan

== Medal table ==
Rank	Nation	Gold	Silver	Bronze	Total
1	Uzbekistan (UZB)	7	4	3	14
2	Kazakhstan (KAZ)	4	5	5	14
3	China (CHN)	2	1	3	6
4	Iran (IRI)	1	0	4	5
5	Chinese Taipei (TPE)	1	0	2	3
6	Indonesia (INA)	1	0	0	1
7	Kyrgyzstan (KGZ)	0	2	2	4
8	Mongolia (MGL)	0	1	6	7
9	Tajikistan (TJK)	0	1	2	3
10	India (IND)	0	1	1	2
11	Afghanistan (AFG)	0	1	0	1
12	Saudi Arabia (KSA)	0	0	1	1
12	Thailand (THA)	0	0	1	1
12	Vietnam (VIE)	0	0	1	1
12	Yemen (YEM)	0	0	1	1
Totals (15 entries)		16	16	32	64

== Results ==
=== Boys ===
==== 50 kg ====
29 October

Round of 16
Abdulwahab Al-Shammari (KUW)	010
Younes Nasser (YEM)	110
Sangay Thinley (BHU)	000
Jahan Zeeb Tareen (AFG)	100
Adilzhan Nurbeken (KAZ)	111
Masoud Al-Mesmari (UAE)	000
Ramis Asilbekov (KGZ)	100
Jirawat Sianglo (THA)	000
Mohammad Reza Kazemi (IRI)	000
Shokhjakhon Usmonov (UZB)	100
Kao Yu-en (TPE)	000
Harsimar Singh Kang (IND)	100
Ty Zhihao (CAM)	000
Yusuf Zamonov (TJK)	100
Wu Zhixiang (CHN)	010
Ahmed Adnan (PAK)	000

Quarterfinals
Younes Nasser (YEM)	100
Jahan Zeeb Tareen (AFG)	000
Adilzhan Nurbeken (KAZ)	001
Ramis Asilbekov (KGZ)	000
Shokhjakhon Usmonov (UZB)	101
Harsimar Singh Kang (IND)	000
Yusuf Zamonov (TJK)	100
Wu Zhixiang (CHN)	000

Semifinals
Younes Nasser (YEM)	000
Adilzhan Nurbeken (KAZ)	011
Shokhjakhon Usmonov (UZB)	001
Yusuf Zamonov (TJK)	100

Final
Adilzhan Nurbeken (KAZ)	100
Yusuf Zamonov (TJK)	000

Repechage
Jahan Zeeb Tareen (AFG)	000
Ramis Asilbekov (KGZ)	101
Harsimar Singh Kang (IND)	101
Wu Zhixiang (CHN)	000

Bronze medals
Ramis Asilbekov (KGZ)	001
Shokhjakhon Usmonov (UZB)	100
Harsimar Singh Kang (IND)	000
Younes Nasser (YEM)	012

==== 55 kg ====
29 October

Round of 16
Aslan Yergaliyev (KAZ)	012
Ma Junlong (CHN)	000
Chang Yun-kuei (TPE)	101
Buti Ahmed Al-Hashmi (UAE)	000
Mohammed Asiri (KSA)	101
Herbert Choi (HKG)	000
Badamdorjiin Badar-Uugan (MGL)	000
Sadiddin Qurbonov (TJK)	010
Abubakr Sattorov (UZB)	100
Khum Rathanaseyla (CAM)	000
Afif Rafiq (MAS)	010
Niketan Meitei Moirangthem (IND)	001
Abolfazl Nazari (IRI)	101
Ratmir Ibragimov (KGZ)	001
Wadud Rahman Roni (BAN)	000
Puriwat Pitarapa (THA)	110

Quarterfinals
Aslan Yergaliyev (KAZ)	100
Chang Yun-kuei (TPE)	000
Mohammed Asiri (KSA)	111
Sadiddin Qurbonov (TJK)	001
Abubakr Sattorov (UZB)	110
Afif Rafiq (MAS)	000
Abolfazl Nazari (IRI)	102
Puriwat Pitarapa (THA)	000

Semifinals
Aslan Yergaliyev (KAZ)	100
Mohammed Asiri (KSA)	000
Abubakr Sattorov (UZB)	101
Abolfazl Nazari (IRI)	000

Final
Aslan Yergaliyev (KAZ)	001
Abubakr Sattorov (UZB)	002

Repechage
Chang Yun-kuei (TPE)	110
Sadiddin Qurbonov (TJK)	000
Afif Rafiq (MAS)	010
Puriwat Pitarapa (THA)	101

Bronze medals
Chang Yun-kuei (TPE)	000
Abolfazl Nazari (IRI)	100
Puriwat Pitarapa (THA)	000
Mohammed Asiri (KSA)	003

==== 60 kg ====
29 October

Round of 32
Keo Puthea Chesada (CAM)	000–100	Sanzhar Abdyldaev (KGZ)

Round of 16
Jamiyangiin Enkhtör (MGL)	100
Soponwit Kaosuwan (THA)	000
Jacob Al-Fajare (PLE)
Nitin Balhara (IND)	WO
Huang Nai-hsuan (TPE)	001
Mohammad Amin Babadi (IRI)	000
Haroun Al-Mashni (JOR)	001
Ebrahim Al-Qadhi (YEM)	010
Ahmed Al-Mehmadi (KSA)	000
Sanzhar Abdyldaev (KGZ)	100
Davlatbek Akhrorov (UZB)	100
Anas Al-Yammahi (UAE)	000
Ahmad Zaidan (SYR)
Liu Yuhang (CHN)	WO
Ismatula Kussainov (KAZ)	000
Shamil Ismoilov (TJK)	010

Quarterfinals
Jamiyangiin Enkhtör (MGL)	000
Nitin Balhara (IND)	100
Huang Nai-hsuan (TPE)	110
Ebrahim Al-Qadhi (YEM)	000
Sanzhar Abdyldaev (KGZ)	000
Davlatbek Akhrorov (UZB)	100
Liu Yuhang (CHN)	100
Shamil Ismoilov (TJK)	000

Semifinals
Nitin Balhara (IND)	000
Huang Nai-hsuan (TPE)	001
Davlatbek Akhrorov (UZB)	100
Liu Yuhang (CHN)	000

Final
Huang Nai-hsuan (TPE)	011
Davlatbek Akhrorov (UZB)	001

Repechage
Jamiyangiin Enkhtör (MGL)	011
Ebrahim Al-Qadhi (YEM)	000
Sanzhar Abdyldaev (KGZ)	WO
Shamil Ismoilov (TJK)

Bronze medals
Jamiyangiin Enkhtör (MGL)	000
Liu Yuhang (CHN)	002
Sanzhar Abdyldaev (KGZ)	001
Nitin Balhara (IND)	000

==== 66 kg ====
29 October

Round of 16
Kan Kaeochan (THA)	000
Yusuf Skandarzoda (TJK)	110
Bekali Yerken (KAZ)	110
Amir Ali Heidari (IRI)	000
Saleh Al-Saadi (QAT)	000
Kartik Sehrawat (IND)	110
Ashraf Azdanin (JOR)	000
Sager Al-Ateibi (UAE)	010
Abdul Bashir Qadiri (AFG)	100
Ruslan Larionov (KGZ)	000
Tsang Sik Lut (HKG)	101
Chalernsay Sayasan (LAO)	001
Nyamsürengiin Erdemiindalai (MGL)	000
Wang Xu (CHN)	010

Quarterfinals
Sultonbek Kuldoshboev (UZB)	000
Yusuf Skandarzoda (TJK)	100
Bekali Yerken (KAZ)	100
Kartik Sehrawat (IND)	000
Sager Al-Ateibi (UAE)	000
Abdul Bashir Qadiri (AFG)	100
Tsang Sik Lut (HKG)	000
Wang Xu (CHN)	102

Semifinals
Yusuf Skandarzoda (TJK)	001
Bekali Yerken (KAZ)	011
Abdul Bashir Qadiri (AFG)	010
Wang Xu (CHN)	000

Final
Bekali Yerken (KAZ)	001
Abdul Bashir Qadiri (AFG)	000

Repechage
Sultonbek Kuldoshboev (UZB)	000
Kartik Sehrawat (IND)	010
Sager Al-Ateibi (UAE)	101
Tsang Sik Lut (HKG)	000

Bronze medals
Kartik Sehrawat (IND)	000
Wang Xu (CHN)	001
Sager Al-Ateibi (UAE)	000
Yusuf Skandarzoda (TJK)	003

==== 73 kg ====
30 October

Round of 16
Thananun Sawutdee (THA)	100
Firhan Iman Faizal (MAS)	000
Harshit (IND)	100
Omar Al-Shuhail (UAE)	000
Mirzohid Khudoykulov (UZB)	100
Xurigan (CHN)	000
Kaisar Sarzhanov (KGZ)	010
Botrous Tarabay (LBN)	000
Haytham Adawi (JOR)	101
Mohammad Al-Rahwan (SYR)	000

Quarterfinals
Sobhan Hakimi (IRI)	100
Thananun Sawutdee (THA)	000
Harshit (IND)	000
Mirzohid Khudoykulov (UZB)	101
Dauletkerey Seifil (KAZ)	001
Kaisar Sarzhanov (KGZ)	000
Ali Al-Jadi (KUW)	010
Haytham Adawi (JOR)	100

Semifinals
Sobhan Hakimi (IRI)	000
Mirzohid Khudoykulov (UZB)	101
Dauletkerey Seifil (KAZ)	100
Haytham Adawi (JOR)	000

Final
Mirzohid Khudoykulov (UZB)	010
Dauletkerey Seifil (KAZ)	000

Repechage
Thananun Sawutdee (THA)	000
Harshit (IND)	100
Kaisar Sarzhanov (KGZ)	010
Ali Al-Jadi (KUW)	100

Bronze medals
Harshit (IND)	010
Haytham Adawi (JOR)	000
Ali Al-Jadi (KUW)	000
Sobhan Hakimi (IRI)	110

==== 81 kg ====
30 October

Round of 16
Batkhuyagiin Temüülen (MGL)	100
Bilol Khushvakhtov (TJK)	000
Samandar Sunnatov (UZB)	110
Rashed Faras (KUW)	000
Wu Peicong (CHN)	101
Peerawit Rayarak (THA)	000

Quarterfinals
Hossein Novin (IRI)	100
Batkhuyagiin Temüülen (MGL)	000
Erlan Kadyrbaev (KGZ)	100
Bhavya (IND)	000
Chang Chieh-tung (TPE)	000
Samandar Sunnatov (UZB)	100
Margulan Zhumabay (KAZ)	010
Wu Peicong (CHN)	100

Semifinals
Hossein Novin (IRI)	000
Erlan Kadyrbaev (KGZ)	001
Samandar Sunnatov (UZB)	012
Wu Peicong (CHN)	000

Final
Erlan Kadyrbaev (KGZ)	000
Samandar Sunnatov (UZB)	101

Repechage
Batkhuyagiin Temüülen (MGL)	101
Bhavya (IND)	000
Chang Chieh-tung (TPE)	002
Margulan Zhumabay (KAZ)	100

Bronze medals
Batkhuyagiin Temüülen (MGL)	010
Wu Peicong (CHN)	000
Margulan Zhumabay (KAZ)	001
Hossein Novin (IRI)	101

==== 90 kg ====
30 October

Round of 16
Ali Al-Qaraan (BRN)	010
Kanisorn Chinon (THA)	100

Quarterfinals
Jurabek Eshpulatov (UZB)	100
Mohammad Barfaraz (IRI)	000
Liu Yang (CHN)	100
Mukhammedali Yrysdolotov (KGZ)	000
Ram Kumar (IND)	100
Kanisorn Chinon (THA)	000
Shynggyskhan Tanirbergen (KAZ)	100
Batjargalyn Möngöndöl (MGL)	000

Semifinals
Jurabek Eshpulatov (UZB)	100
Liu Yang (CHN)	000
Ram Kumar (IND)	000
Shynggyskhan Tanirbergen (KAZ)	100

Final
Jurabek Eshpulatov (UZB)	011
Shynggyskhan Tanirbergen (KAZ)	000

Repechage
Mohammad Barfaraz (IRI)	WO
Mukhammedali Yrysdolotov (KGZ)
Kanisorn Chinon (THA)	000
Batjargalyn Möngöndöl (MGL)	100

Bronze medals
Mohammad Barfaraz (IRI)	010
Ram Kumar (IND)	000
Batjargalyn Möngöndöl (MGL)	001
Liu Yang (CHN)	000

==== +90 kg ====
30 October

Quarterfinals		Semifinals		Final
Alibek Durdiev (UZB)	100
Porjai Methasuwon (THA)	000	Alibek Durdiev (UZB)	110
Tian Haoxuan (CHN)	100	Tian Haoxuan (CHN)	000
Mohamed Al-Shamsi (UAE)	000			Alibek Durdiev (UZB)	101
Adilzhan Zhaudinov (KAZ)	100			Adilzhan Zhaudinov (KAZ)	000
Shamil Mamedov (KGZ)	000	Adilzhan Zhaudinov (KAZ)	100
Ivan Ong (MAS)	000	Sanjaagiin Mönkh-Erdene (MGL)	000
Sanjaagiin Mönkh-Erdene (MGL)	110

Repechage
Porjai Methasuwon (THA)	000
Mohamed Al-Shamsi (UAE)	002
Shamil Mamedov (KGZ)	101
Ivan Ong (MAS)	000

Bronze medals
Mohamed Al-Shamsi (UAE)
Sanjaagiin Mönkh-Erdene (MGL)	WO
Shamil Mamedov (KGZ)	000
Tian Haoxuan (CHN)	100

=== Girls ===
==== 40 kg ====
29 October

Quarterfinals		Semifinals		Final
		Dilafruz Boltaboeva (UZB)	100
Bao Rui-yun (TPE)	000	Nikita (IND)	000
Nikita (IND)	001			Dilafruz Boltaboeva (UZB)	100
Bayarzulyn Khulan (MGL)	010			Bayarzulyn Khulan (MGL)	010
Ominabonu Toshova (TJK)	000	Bayarzulyn Khulan (MGL)	010
Anastasiia Stepanova (KGZ)	001	Anastasiia Stepanova (KGZ)	002
Adiya Zhanakhmet (KAZ)	000

Repechage
Ominabonu Toshova (TJK)	000
Adiya Zhanakhmet (KAZ)	100

Bronze medals
Bao Rui-yun (TPE)	001
Anastasiia Stepanova (KGZ)	000
Adiya Zhanakhmet (KAZ)	001
Nikita (IND)	000

==== 44 kg ====
29 October

Round of 16
Ganchimegiin Tselmüün (MGL)	100
Samita Nepali (NEP)	000
Alina Kolucheva (UZB)	101
Phimphisut Greephong (THA)	000
Nur Fasha Zazali (MAS)	101
Souklinda Keovixay (LAO)	000
Ngô Thị Cẩm Tiên (VIE)	000
Zhao Zihui (CHN)	100

Quarterfinals
Nahella Nadzwa Sabilla (INA)	000
Ganchimegiin Tselmüün (MGL)	100
Shen Shao-yun (TPE)	000
Alina Kolucheva (UZB)	100
Munira Manasbekova (KGZ)	001
Nur Fasha Zazali (MAS)	000
Inzhu Sakhabadin (KAZ)	000
Zhao Zihui (CHN)	101

Semifinals
Ganchimegiin Tselmüün (MGL)	000
Alina Kolucheva (UZB)	010
Munira Manasbekova (KGZ)	000
Zhao Zihui (CHN)	100

Final
Alina Kolucheva (UZB)	000
Zhao Zihui (CHN)	010

Repechage
Nahella Nadzwa Sabilla (INA)	000
Shen Shao-yun (TPE)	011
Nur Fasha Zazali (MAS)	000
Inzhu Sakhabadin (KAZ)	100

Bronze medals
Shen Shao-yun (TPE)	101
Munira Manasbekova (KGZ)	000
Inzhu Sakhabadin (KAZ)	013
Ganchimegiin Tselmüün (MGL)	000

==== 48 kg ====
29 October

Round of 16
Layzenri Jazzyra Octa (INA)	000
Mahsa Shakibaei (IRI)	112
Raihonai Rozikzoda (TJK)	000
Enkhtöriin Temügen (MGL)	101
Sutticha Lomprakhon (THA)	000
Zhang Qingxinyu (CHN)	101
Diana Azambekova (UZB)	100
Chen Xin (TPE)	011

Quarterfinals
Houda Wshah (JOR)	000
Mahsa Shakibaei (IRI)	100
Tania Das (IND)	100
Enkhtöriin Temügen (MGL)	000
Alua Baltabay (KAZ)	001
Zhang Qingxinyu (CHN)	000
Iasemin Talgartbekova (KGZ)	000
Diana Azambekova (UZB)	011

Semifinals
Mahsa Shakibaei (IRI)	110
Tania Das (IND)	000
Alua Baltabay (KAZ)	100
Diana Azambekova (UZB)	000

Final
Mahsa Shakibaei (IRI)	100
Alua Baltabay (KAZ)	001

Repechage
Houda Wshah (JOR)	000
Enkhtöriin Temügen (MGL)	100
Zhang Qingxinyu (CHN)	000
Iasemin Talgartbekova (KGZ)	100

Bronze medals
Enkhtöriin Temügen (MGL)	001
Diana Azambekova (UZB)	000
Iasemin Talgartbekova (KGZ)	001
Tania Das (IND)	000

==== 52 kg ====
29 October

Round of 16
Sara Al-Saifi (JOR)	000
Zuhal Jumaeva (TJK)	113
Rasya Adhiela Shabira (INA)	000
Qaleeda Izz'dika Rosidi (MAS)	101
Lkhagvadorjiin Sayajargal (MGL)	000
Zheng Bohan (CHN)	100
Kwan Chui Yi (HKG)	101
Thuimenu Marma (BAN)	000

Quarterfinals
Fatima Supygaliyeva (KAZ)	100
Zuhal Jumaeva (TJK)	000
Zuhra Alimova (UZB)	110
Qaleeda Izz'dika Rosidi (MAS)	000
Milena Borubolotova (KGZ)	002
Zheng Bohan (CHN)	001
Samela Barmada (SYR)	100
Kwan Chui Yi (HKG)	000

Semifinals
Fatima Supygaliyeva (KAZ)	001
Zuhra Alimova (UZB)	000
Milena Borubolotova (KGZ)	100
Samela Barmada (SYR)	001

Final
Fatima Supygaliyeva (KAZ)	100
Milena Borubolotova (KGZ)	000

Repechage
Zuhal Jumaeva (TJK)	100
Qaleeda Izz'dika Rosidi (MAS)	000
Zheng Bohan (CHN)	001
Kwan Chui Yi (HKG)	000

Bronze medals
Zuhal Jumaeva (TJK)	WO
Samela Barmada (SYR)
Zheng Bohan (CHN)	000
Zuhra Alimova (UZB)	001

==== 57 kg ====
30 October

Round of 16
Lojain Alaeddin (SYR)	000
Chatchadaphon Suwannawichit (THA)	001
Shravani Satish Dike (IND)	011
Demüüliin Suvd-Erdene (MGL)	100
Liu Pin-yen (TPE)	001
Yu Yue (CHN)	002

Quarterfinals
Gulsanam Khazratova (UZB)	101
Chatchadaphon Suwannawichit (THA)	000
Batool Al-Qanbar (KSA)	000
Phạm Minh Tuyết (VIE)	110
Inzhu Zhumazhan (KAZ)	101
Demüüliin Suvd-Erdene (MGL)	001
Aaisha Kyialbekova (KGZ)	000
Yu Yue (CHN)	102

Semifinals
Gulsanam Khazratova (UZB)	001
Phạm Minh Tuyết (VIE)	000
Inzhu Zhumazhan (KAZ)	000
Yu Yue (CHN)	100

Final
Gulsanam Khazratova (UZB)	010
Yu Yue (CHN)	002

Repechage
Chatchadaphon Suwannawichit (THA)	111
Batool Al-Qanbar (KSA)	000
Demüüliin Suvd-Erdene (MGL)	WO
Aaisha Kyialbekova (KGZ)

Bronze medals
Chatchadaphon Suwannawichit (THA)	000
Inzhu Zhumazhan (KAZ)	100
Demüüliin Suvd-Erdene (MGL)	000
Phạm Minh Tuyết (VIE)	001

==== 63 kg ====
30 October

Round of 16
Sunantha Chaiyakarn (THA)	000
Li Zexuan (CHN)	100

Quarterfinals
Sashenka Fatimah (INA)	102
Li Zexuan (CHN)	000
Enkhtaivany Anudari (MGL)	101
Taleen Khader (JOR)	000
Azima Serik (KAZ)	001
Maftuna Akhmedova (UZB)	002
Monika Devi Khuyenthem (IND)	100
Aigerim Adaminova (KGZ)	000

Semifinals
Sashenka Fatimah (INA)	002
Enkhtaivany Anudari (MGL)	000
Maftuna Akhmedova (UZB)	000
Monika Devi Khuyenthem (IND)	100

Final
Sashenka Fatimah (INA)	100
Monika Devi Khuyenthem (IND)	000

Repechage
Li Zexuan (CHN)	110
Taleen Khader (JOR)	000
Azima Serik (KAZ)	101
Aigerim Adaminova (KGZ)	000

Bronze medals
Li Zexuan (CHN)	000
Maftuna Akhmedova (UZB)	001
Azima Serik (KAZ)	100
Enkhtaivany Anudari (MGL)	000

==== 70 kg ====
30 October

Quarterfinals		Semifinals		Final
		Aisha Altay (KAZ)	101
Pettanwa Rompho (THA)	000	Khadbaataryn Buyanjargal (MGL)	000
Khadbaataryn Buyanjargal (MGL)	110			Aisha Altay (KAZ)	001
Shohista Turaeva (UZB)	101			Shohista Turaeva (UZB)	000
Mohanna Kamgouei (IRI)	000	Shohista Turaeva (UZB)	100
Ira Makode (IND)	100	Ira Makode (IND)	000
Uulzhan Kanaeva (KGZ)	000

Repechage
Mohanna Kamgouei (IRI)	100
Uulzhan Kanaeva (KGZ)	000

Bronze medals
Pettanwa Rompho (THA)	002
Ira Makode (IND)	001
Mohanna Kamgouei (IRI)	000
Khadbaataryn Buyanjargal (MGL)	100

==== +70 kg ====
30 October

Quarterfinals		Semifinals		Final
		Togzhan Tolebay (KAZ)	000
Batjargalyn Nomuunzayaa (MGL)	000	Zhang Shuhan (CHN)	001
Zhang Shuhan (CHN)	110			Zhang Shuhan (CHN)	100
Loloa Al-Aliane (KSA)	000			Khonzodabegim Usmankulova (UZB)	000
Sumaia Akmatova (KGZ)	100	Sumaia Akmatova (KGZ)	010
Khonzodabegim Usmankulova (UZB)	101	Khonzodabegim Usmankulova (UZB)	100
Piyathida Songchai (THA)	000

Repechage
Loloa Al-Aliane (KSA)	000
Piyathida Songchai (THA)	111

Bronze medals
Batjargalyn Nomuunzayaa (MGL)	100
Sumaia Akmatova (KGZ)	000
Piyathida Songchai (THA)	000
Togzhan Tolebay (KAZ)	100
