= Cycling at the 2025 Asian Youth Games =

- Venue: Nasser bin Hamad Loop
- Dates: 24–29 October 2025

Road cycling at the 2025 Asian Youth Games was held in NBH Loop, Zallaq, Bahrain from 24 to 29 October 2025.

== Medalists ==
Event	Gold	Silver	Bronze
Boys' road race	Lee Wan Chun; Hong Kong	Kittaphat Homkajorn; Thailand	Taha Al-Khalifah; Saudi Arabia
Boys' individual time trial	Zhang Qiaochu; China	Hsieh Chih-hsiang; Chinese Taipei	Kittaphat Homkajorn; Thailand
Girls' road race	Gulhayo Sattorova; Uzbekistan	Valeriya Kuznetsova; Kazakhstan	Law Ching Kiu; Hong Kong
Girls' individual time trial	Anel Tashbay; Kazakhstan	Xing Aofei; China	Law Ching Kiu; Hong Kong
Mixed team time trial relay	Kazakhstan; Kirill Polyshev; Danil Tretyakov; Rinat Yerik; Irina Ivanovskaya; Valeriya Kuznetsova; Anel Tashbay	Chinese Taipei; Hsieh Chih-hsiang; Lo Po-cheng; Shie Hau-shiuan; Liu En-hsiu; Lo Wei; Yang Chiao-hui	China; Cheng Hexuan; Huang Sichen; Zhang Qiaochu; Li Mengping; Wang Shiyue; Xing Aofei

== Medal table ==
Rank	Nation	Gold	Silver	Bronze	Total
1	Kazakhstan (KAZ)	2	1	0	3
2	China (CHN)	1	1	1	3
3	Hong Kong (HKG)	1	0	2	3
4	Uzbekistan (UZB)	1	0	0	1
5	Chinese Taipei (TPE)	0	2	0	2
6	Thailand (THA)	0	1	1	2
7	Saudi Arabia (KSA)	0	0	1	1
Totals (7 entries)		5	5	5	15

== Results ==
=== Boys' road race ===
29 October

Rank	Athlete	Time
1st place, gold medalist(s)	Lee Wan Chun (HKG)	2:23:54
2nd place, silver medalist(s)	Kittaphat Homkajorn (THA)	2:23:54
3rd place, bronze medalist(s)	Taha Al-Khalifah (KSA)	2:24:04
4	Hasan Thamer (BRN)	2:24:12
5	Kenta Kudo (JPN)	2:24:12
6	Ilyosbek Urozboev (UZB)	2:24:15
7	Ren Zhenxin (CHN)	2:24:15
8	Sultan Al-Hammadi (UAE)	2:24:15
9	Rinat Yerik (KAZ)	2:24:15
10	Ryoma Sano (JPN)	2:24:15
11	Ali Jahanbanian (IRI)	2:24:15
12	CJ Cabreros (PHI)	2:24:15
13	Aziq Riszkey Sharuddin (MAS)	2:24:17
14	Hsieh Chih-hsiang (TPE)	2:24:17
15	Zafrul Syukry (MAS)	2:24:17
16	Anandyn Erdene-Ochir (MGL)	2:24:17
17	Amir Pouyan Koneshloo (IRI)	2:24:17
18	Lo Po-cheng (TPE)	2:24:17
19	Kirill Safronov (KGZ)	2:24:17
20	Cheng Hexuan (CHN)	2:24:17
21	Lai Xuan Er (MAS)	2:24:17
22	Danil Tretyakov (KAZ)	2:24:24
23	Shoislom Shoakmalov (UZB)	2:24:24
24	Faric Noothong (THA)	2:24:24
25	Ammar Ihab (IRQ)	2:24:24
26	Emil Valishin (UZB)	2:24:24
27	Aditya Jakhar (IND)	2:24:24
28	Shogo Mikami (JPN)	2:24:24
29	Lokesh Choudhary (IND)	2:24:24
30	Hukman Al-Fazl (INA)	2:24:24
31	Saif Abdul-Hamza (IRQ)	2:24:24
32	Ularbek Sakitaev (KGZ)	2:24:31
33	Sunny (IND)	2:24:31
34	Kirill Polyshev (KAZ)	2:24:36
35	Athikhun Saenta (THA)	2:24:36
36	Isa Al-Khasham (BRN)	2:24:39
37	Shie Hau-shiuan (TPE)	2:24:53
38	Falah Al-Nuaimi (UAE)	2:25:00
39	Dương Trung Hiếu (VIE)	2:25:00
40	Zhang Qiaochu (CHN)	2:25:12
41	Myagmardorjiin Bayasgalan (MGL)	2:25:13
42	Seif Mishael (JOR)	2:25:24
43	Kira Kuratani (JPN)	2:25:26
44	Watcharaphong Sangkhason (THA)	2:25:32
45	Fahid Bazian (JOR)	2:26:09
46	Hesam Heidari (IRI)	2:26:45
47	Ulan Muratov (KAZ)	2:26:46
48	Mamurjon Rimboev (UZB)	2:28:51
49	Trần Khởi Minh (VIE)	2:29:15
50	Hareez Naufal Syanizam (MAS)	2:34:05
51	Alok Bishnoi (IND)	2:36:57
—	Abdulla Al-Hashmi (UAE)	DNF
—	Joelian Abdul Hamid (PHI)	DNF
—	Carl Laurence Espinosa (PHI)	DNF
—	Yousif Ahmed (IRQ)	DNF
—	Muaded Al-Mashghouni (UAE)	DNF
—	Abdulaali Palarca (QAT)	DNF
—	Abdulaziz Al-Adawi (QAT)	DNF
—	Thamer Thamer (BRN)	DNF
—	Ali Isam (IRQ)	DNF
—	Erdenejargalyn Khash-Erdene (MGL)	DNF
—	Huang Sichen (CHN)	DNF
—	Abid Hasan (BAN)	DNF
—	Trần Công Mẫn (VIE)	DNF
—	Ahmad Umayer (BAN)	DNF
—	Hussain Kadhem (BRN)	DNF
—	Jassim Al-Jaber (QAT)	DNF
—	Mohammed Saeed Al-Hanaei (QAT)	DNF
—	Sardorbek Matkarimov (KGZ)	DNF

=== Boys' individual time trial ===
27 October

Rank	Athlete	Time
1st place, gold medalist(s)	Zhang Qiaochu (CHN)	21:45.65
2nd place, silver medalist(s)	Hsieh Chih-hsiang (TPE)	21:47.64
3rd place, bronze medalist(s)	Kittaphat Homkajorn (THA)	21:50.39
4	Shoislom Shoakmalov (UZB)	22:25.78
5	Falah Al-Nuaimi (UAE)	22:34.34
6	Aditya Jakhar (IND)	22:41.54
7	Trần Khởi Minh (VIE)	22:58.59
8	Hukman Al-Fazl (INA)	22:59.45
9	Taha Al-Khalifah (KSA)	23:03.14
10	CJ Cabreros (PHI)	23:06.39
11	Myagmardorjiin Bayasgalan (MGL)	23:16.86
12	Lee Wan Chun (HKG)	23:18.44
13	Shogo Mikami (JPN)	23:29.43
14	Kirill Safronov (KGZ)	23:37.09
15	Ammar Ihab (IRQ)	23:48.33
16	Ali Jahanbanian (IRI)	23:48.94
17	Hasan Thamer (BRN)	23:52.33
18	Danil Tretyakov (KAZ)	24:03.78
19	Fahid Bazian (JOR)	24:30.32
20	Hareez Naufal Syanizam (MAS)	24:32.85
21	Abdulaali Palarca (QAT)	25:11.05
22	Abid Hasan (BAN)	26:40.37

=== Girls' road race ===
28 October

Rank	Athlete	Time
1st place, gold medalist(s)	Gulhayo Sattorova (UZB)	1:59:26
2nd place, silver medalist(s)	Valeriya Kuznetsova (KAZ)	1:59:26
3rd place, bronze medalist(s)	Law Ching Kiu (HKG)	1:59:26
4	Sabrina Altinbekova (UZB)	1:59:26
5	Li Mengping (CHN)	1:59:26
6	Maritanya Krog (PHI)	1:59:26
7	Yang Chiao-hui (TPE)	1:59:26
8	Anel Tashbay (KAZ)	1:59:26
9	Irina Ivanovskaya (KAZ)	1:59:26
10	Mila Safa Fidela (INA)	1:59:26
11	Maria Louisse Crisselle Alejado (PHI)	1:59:26
12	Davia Evriel Eriana Azif (MAS)	1:59:26
13	Narvin Zeinali (IRI)	1:59:30
14	Raha Bajelan (IRI)	1:59:30
15	Sunisa Chumthong (THA)	1:59:30
16	Yvaine Osias (PHI)	1:59:30
17	Seema Abdeljaber (JOR)	1:59:30
18	Ündes-Erdeniin Nandin-Erdene (MGL)	1:59:30
19	Karina Miskova (KAZ)	1:59:30
20	He Jiajia (CHN)	1:59:30
21	Kanna Odashima (JPN)	1:59:30
22	Sofiia Babunova (KGZ)	1:59:30
23	Xing Aofei (CHN)	1:59:30
24	Wang Shiyue (CHN)	1:59:35
25	Liu En-hsiu (TPE)	1:59:35
26	Enkh-Amgalangiin Badamtsetseg (MGL)	1:59:35
27	Ekaterina Makarochkina (UZB)	1:59:39
28	Afraa Al-Mihal (UAE)	1:59:41
29	Lo Wei (TPE)	1:59:41
30	Elena Nasseri (IRI)	1:59:41
31	Bùi Đàm Mai Chi (VIE)	1:59:41
32	Prajakta Suryawanshi (IND)	1:59:44
33	Suratya Wongphan (THA)	1:59:46
34	Nikita Shinde (IND)	1:59:49
35	Anjali Jakhar (IND)	1:59:49
36	Thanchanok Jinaphirom (THA)	1:59:55
37	Nguyễn Khang Hà My (VIE)	1:59:59
38	Rukhamani (IND)	2:00:01
39	Gansükhiin Ariunkhüslen (MGL)	2:07:34
40	Hà Ngọc Diệp (VIE)	2:11:41
41	Malak Zadeh (UAE)	2:13:34
—	Dilnurakhon Mirzavalieva (UZB)	DNF
—	Dana Al-Doseri (BRN)	DNF
—	Zainab Karam (BRN)	DNF
—	Jood Al-Oraibi (BRN)	DNF
—	Aseel Salman (BRN)	DNF
—	Nur Aieris Madhiah Adni (MAS)	DSQ

=== Girls' individual time trial ===
26 October

Rank	Athlete	Time
1st place, gold medalist(s)	Anel Tashbay (KAZ)	17:06.05
2nd place, silver medalist(s)	Xing Aofei (CHN)	17:25.08
3rd place, bronze medalist(s)	Law Ching Kiu (HKG)	17:40.41
4	Anjali Jakhar (IND)	17:43.89
5	Lo Wei (TPE)	17:56.28
6	Mila Safa Fidela (INA)	18:00.08
7	Kanna Odashima (JPN)	18:09.89
8	Madina Anvarova (UZB)	18:13.63
9	Ündes-Erdeniin Nandin-Erdene (MGL)	18:19.57
10	Raha Bajelan (IRI)	18:21.22
11	Sunisa Chumthong (THA)	18:34.38
12	Sofiia Babunova (KGZ)	18:50.45
13	Maria Louisse Crisselle Alejado (PHI)	18:53.40
14	Davia Evriel Eriana Azif (MAS)	19:02.53
15	Nguyễn Khang Hà My (VIE)	19:41.57
16	Seema Abdeljaber (JOR)	19:48.46
17	Malak Zadeh (UAE)	21:08.33
18	Dana Al-Doseri (BRN)	21:40.52

=== Mixed team time trial relay ===
24 October

Rank	Team	Time
1st place, gold medalist(s)	Kazakhstan (KAZ)	45:19.38
2nd place, silver medalist(s)	Chinese Taipei (TPE)	45:53.69
3rd place, bronze medalist(s)	China (CHN)	46:49.66
4	Uzbekistan (UZB)	47:31.18
5	Thailand (THA)	48:56.80
6	India (IND)	49:06.86
7	Vietnam (VIE)	49:32.59
8	Mongolia (MGL)	49:47.72
9	Philippines (PHI)	1:04:22.70
—	Iran (IRI)	DNF
