= Kannagi Nagar Karthika =

Indian kabaddi player

R. Karthika
Personal information
- Nicknames: Kannagi Nagar Karthika; Karthika Express
- Nationality: Indian
- Born: R. Karthika; 2008 (age 17–18) Chennai, Tamil Nadu
- Years active: 2018-present

Sport
- Country: India
- Sport: Kabaddi
- Team: India
- Coached by: K. Raji
Medal record
Representing India
World Cup
Gold medal – first place	2025 Bahrain	India

R. Karthika (born c. 2008) is an Indian kabaddi player from Kannagi Nagar, Chennai, Tamil Nadu. She is best known for captaining and later serving as vice-captain of India's under-18 girls’ kabaddi team, which won the gold medal at the 2025 Asian Youth Games in Bahrain, where the team defeated Iran 75–21 in the final. Coming from a working-class community, she is widely regarded as a symbol of sports-driven upliftment for girls from under-privileged urban areas. She is commonly called Karthika Express and Kannagi Nagar Karthika.

== Early life and background ==
Karthika hails from Kannagi Nagar, a large tenement area in southern Chennai, Tamil Nadu, home to more than 20,000 families. She studied at a government school in her neighbourhood. Her father works in construction and her mother, previously a civic worker, now drives an auto-rickshaw to support the family. In 2018, a local coach, K. Raji, formed a girls’ kabaddi team in Kannagi Nagar to challenge the negative image attached to the area and empower young women through sport. Karthika joined the girls’ team coached by Raji, practising in informal conditions such as a corner of a public park while balancing her schoolwork. She quickly distinguished herself and got selected for senior national-camp exposure at age 16.

== Career ==
=== International achievements ===
In October 2025, Karthika co-led the Indian Under-18 girls’ kabaddi team to an unbeaten run at the Asian Youth Games in Bahrain, culminating in a dominant 75–21 win over Iran in the final. Following the achievement, she received both state-level recognition and a celebratory homecoming in Kannagi Nagar, where she rode a horse-drawn chariot and was welcomed by her community. M. K. Stalin, Chief Minister of Tamil Nadu, presented each of R. Karthika and Abinesh Mohandhas with a cheque of ₹ 25 lakh in recognition of their gold-medal performance at the 2025 Asian Youth Games.

=== Challenges and future prospects ===
Despite her success, Karthika continues to train in less-than-ideal infrastructure: the girls’ team still practices outdoors, and they have long sought an indoor kabaddi facility in Kannagi Nagar. The state government has since assured support, including training infrastructure and according to reports a house and job after she turns 18. Going forward, her inclusion in senior national camps suggests her potential to progress into the senior Indian women's team.
