= Iran at the 2025 Asian Youth Games =

- IOC code: IRI
- NOC: National Olympic Committee of the Islamic Republic of Iran

in Bahrain
- Competitors: 238 in 22 sports
- Flag bearers: Mehdi Jamali; Asal Goltappeh
- Medals Ranked 4th: Gold 22 Silver 18 Bronze 36 Total 76

Asian Youth Games appearances
- 2009; 2013; 2025

Iran participated in the 2025 Asian Youth Games held in Bahrain from 22 to 31 October 2025. This country is ranked 4th with 22 gold medals in this edition of the Youth Asiad.

== Competitors ==
Sport	Boys	Girls	Total
3x3 basketball	4	4	8
Athletics	5	3	8
Badminton		1	1
Beach volleyball	2		2
Beach wrestling	4		4
Boxing	5	3	8
Cycling	3	3	6
Esports	2		2
Futsal	14	14	28
Golf	1		1
Handball	16	16	32
Judo	7	2	9
Kabaddi	14	14	28
Kurash	2	2	4
Mixed martial arts	8	4	12
Muaythai	10	8	18
Pencak silat	1	1	2
Swimming	5		5
Table tennis	2	1	3
Taekwondo	7	7	14
Triathlon	1		1
Volleyball	12	12	24
Weightlifting	4	6	10
Wrestling	8		8
Total	137	101	238

== Medal summary ==
=== Medals by sport ===
Sport	Gold	Silver	Bronze	Total
3x3 basketball		1		1
Athletics			2	2
Beach wrestling	2	2		4
Boxing		2	4	6
Esports			1	1
Futsal	1	1		2
Handball	1			1
Judo	1		4	5
Kabaddi		2		2
Kurash		2	2	4
Mixed martial arts	4	1	2	7
Muaythai	2	2	5	9
Pencak silat			1	1
Swimming	2			2
Table tennis			1	1
Taekwondo	3	2	6	11
Volleyball	2			2
Weightlifting	1	2	6	9
Wrestling	3	1	2	6
Total	22	18	36	76

=== Medalists ===
Medal	Name	Sport	Event
Gold	Sina Shokouhi	Beach wrestling	Boys' 70 kg
Gold	Touraj Khodaei	Beach wrestling	Boys' 80 kg
Gold	Elina Mansouri; Niayesh Rahmani; Nafiseh Mohammadi; Ghazal Rahmani; Sarina Zare; Tannaz Bagheri; Hadis Yari; Fatemeh Abbasi; Setayesh Rezaei; Narges Amirmohseni; Zahra Amini; Fatemeh Shokrani; Aynaz Yazdipour; Elnaz Hosseinipour	Futsal	Girls
Gold	Fatemeh Olfatnia; Diana Rezaei; Tina Khoshnejad; Negar Babasafari; Fatemeh Behzadi; Sarina Rostami; Sana Fotouhi; Dina Derakhshanmehr; Reihaneh Hosseini; Hasti Arianfar; Aseman Badvi; Arezoo Taleei; Parisan Ahmadkhosravi; Hasti Sheikhalizadeh; Zahra Afshari; Melika Safikhani	Handball	Girls
Gold	Mahsa Shakibaei	Judo	Girls' 48 kg
Gold	Amir Mohammad Hatamian	Mixed martial arts	Boys' traditional 60 kg
Gold	Amir Mehdi Vazifeh	Mixed martial arts	Boys' traditional 80 kg
Gold	Vania Fathalipour	Mixed martial arts	Girls' modern 55 kg
Gold	Tiam Dehpahlavan	Mixed martial arts	Girls' traditional 60 kg
Gold	Baran Jani	Muaythai	Girls' 40 kg (U15)
Gold	Rojan Behnami	Muaythai	Girls' 48 kg (U15)
Gold	Mohammad Mehdi Gholami	Swimming	Boys' 100 m butterfly
Gold	Mohammad Mehdi Gholami	Swimming	Boys' 200 m butterfly
Gold	Behdad Naghiei	Taekwondo	Boys' individual recognized poomsae
Gold	Zeinab Shahriari	Taekwondo	Girls' individual recognized poomsae
Gold	Behdad Naghiei; Zeinab Shahriari	Taekwondo	Mixed pair recognized poomsae
Gold	Mohammad Amin Rahimi; Mohammad Nima Bateni; Hossein Zamani; Amir Mohammad Ramezani; Mirmohammad Mousavi; Mobin Kolasangiani; Amir Naderi; Mehdi Sakhavi; Amir Mohammad Rafieirad; Armin Asiaei; Parsa Gallehdar; Shantia Behnejad	Volleyball	Boys
Gold	Ayda Baghernia; Yalda Jafari; Laya Afzouni; Hasti Vahedi; Yasna Ahankoub; Masoumeh Ghadami; Setayesh Hosseini; Negar Hosseini; Ayda Valinejad; Mobina Karimi; Negar Abbasi; Elena Homayounirad	Volleyball	Girls
Gold	Hossein Yazdani	Weightlifting	Boys' +94 kg clean & jerk
Gold	Parsa Tahmasebi	Wrestling	Boys' freestyle 45 kg
Gold	Morteza Hajmollamohammadi	Wrestling	Boys' freestyle 65 kg
Gold	Amir Mohammad Zarinkam	Wrestling	Boys' freestyle 71 kg
Silver	Elina Evini; Hasti Khazaei; Elena Ahmadian; Mobina Bereihi	3x3 basketball	Girls
Silver	Amir Ali Domirkolaei	Beach wrestling	Boys' 60 kg
Silver	Mohammad Mehdi Fotouhi	Beach wrestling	Boys' 90 kg
Silver	Matin Chamipa	Boxing	Boys' 54 kg
Silver	Mehrshad Sherafatmand	Boxing	Boys' 75 kg
Silver	Mohammad Ali Shekarchi; Mohammad Amin Safaei; Saeid Fakhrani; Abolfazl Zamani; Sadra Choupani; Hossein Reza Yousefi; Amir Hossein Mostasharnejad; Amir Hossein Abdolrazzaghi; Ali Ahmadi; Mohammad Javad Norouzi; Mohammad Hossein Gharibi; Mohammad Arshia Atef; Amir Hossein Dahipour; Mohammad Matin Karami	Futsal	Boys
Silver	Mahdiar Avarseji; Ali Asadpour; Bardia Babapour; Mehdi Ghahremani; Mohammad Hadi Hassannejad; Hossein Nasseri; Saleh Malekzadeh; Mohsen Hamoudi; Amir Ali Khalili; Alireza Rezaeimehr; Amir Arsalan Shahraki; Saleh Shahkouhmahalli; Taha Eslami; Amir Ali Pournikghalb	Kabaddi	Boys
Silver	Aysan Ghasemi; Hasti Keshavarzi; Mahsa Borounli; Zahra Shahsavan; Mobina Madadi; Elistar Shokri; Fatemeh Abbaszadeh; Mohanna Khalili; Shadi Ashrafi; Fereshteh Kolagar; Kiana Fazeli; Respina Mohebbi; Faezeh Moradi; Paria Hoshyar	Kabaddi	Girls
Silver	Yousef Baghcheghi	Kurash	Boys' 65 kg
Silver	Mehrab Mokarrami	Kurash	Boys' 83 kg
Silver	Ilia Vahedi	Mixed martial arts	Boys' traditional 70 kg
Silver	Abolfazl Hajivand	Muaythai	Boys' 45 kg (U15)
Silver	Yasin Mousavi	Muaythai	Boys' 60 kg (U17)
Silver	Pinar Lotfizadeh	Taekwondo	Girls' 63 kg
Silver	Asal Goltappeh	Taekwondo	Girls' +63 kg
Silver	Nasim Ghasemi	Weightlifting	Girls' 77 kg snatch
Silver	Nasim Ghasemi	Weightlifting	Girls' 77 kg clean & jerk
Silver	Arman Elahi	Wrestling	Boys' freestyle 51 kg
Bronze	Mohammad Alidousti	Athletics	Boys' 2000 m steeplechase
Bronze	Alireza Samimi	Athletics	Boys' discus throw
Bronze	Farzan Ahmadi	Boxing	Boys' 66 kg
Bronze	Farhoud Ghorbani	Boxing	Boys' 75 kg
Bronze	Yekta Sahraei	Boxing	Girls' 75 kg
Bronze	Fatemeh Rastegar	Boxing	Girls' +80 kg
Bronze	Amir Mohammad Farahani	Esports	Boys' eFootball
Bronze	Abolfazl Nazari	Judo	Boys' 55 kg
Bronze	Sobhan Hakimi	Judo	Boys' 73 kg
Bronze	Hossein Novin	Judo	Boys' 81 kg
Bronze	Mohammad Barfaraz	Judo	Boys' 90 kg
Bronze	Setayesh Jalaleddin	Kurash	Girls' 52 kg
Bronze	Mahsa Barzegar	Kurash	Girls' 70 kg
Bronze	Ali Asghar Moradi	Mixed martial arts	Boys' modern 60 kg
Bronze	Kamand Karamzad	Mixed martial arts	Girls' traditional 50 kg
Bronze	Amir Abbas Saghari	Muaythai	Boys' wai kru (U15)
Bronze	Taha Sharifi	Muaythai	Boys' wai kru (U17)
Bronze	Amir Mohammad Majidinia	Muaythai	Boys' 57 kg (U17)
Bronze	Sevda Aghaei	Muaythai	Girls' wai kru (U15)
Bronze	Maedeh Sadeghzadeh	Muaythai	Girls' 45 kg (U15)
Bronze	Alireza Mortazi	Pencak silat	Boys' tanding 63 kg
Bronze	Benyamin Faraji	Table tennis	Boys' singles
Bronze	Mohammad Amin Habibzadeh	Taekwondo	Boys' individual freestyle poomsae
Bronze	Mohammad Javad Geryan	Taekwondo	Boys' 73 kg
Bronze	Sana Shaygan	Taekwondo	Girls' individual freestyle poomsae
Bronze	Dina Babarahim	Taekwondo	Girls' 55 kg
Bronze	Mohammad Amin Habibzadeh; Sana Shaygan	Taekwondo	Mixed pair freestyle poomsae
Bronze	Amir Eghbali; Mohammad Javad Geryan; Asal Goltappeh; Pinar Lotfizadeh	Taekwondo	Mixed team kyorugi
Bronze	Behnoud Nosrati	Weightlifting	Boys' 88 kg clean & jerk
Bronze	Hossein Yazdani	Weightlifting	Boys' +94 kg snatch
Bronze	Hasti Sedighi	Weightlifting	Girls' 63 kg clean & jerk
Bronze	Zahra Hosseini	Weightlifting	Girls' 69 kg snatch
Bronze	Zahra Hosseini	Weightlifting	Girls' 69 kg clean & jerk
Bronze	Mahsa Beheshti	Weightlifting	Girls' +77 kg snatch
Bronze	Taha Hashemi	Wrestling	Boys' freestyle 60 kg
Bronze	Mohammad Parsa Karami	Wrestling	Boys' freestyle 80 kg

== Results by event ==
=== 3x3 basketball ===
Athlete	Event	Preliminary round							Quarterfinal	Semifinal	Final	Rank
Athlete	Event	Round 1	Round 2	Round 3	Round 4	Round 5	Round 6	Rank	Quarterfinal	Semifinal	Final	Rank
Amir Reza Azari; Mohammad Safa Behnia; Bardia Khosravi; Alireza Rashidi	Boys	Sri Lanka; W 21–7	Yemen; W 21–10	Saudi Arabia; W 21–6	Kazakhstan; W 21–8	Bangladesh; W 21–3	—N/a	1 Q	China; L 20–21	Did not advance		5
Elina Evini; Hasti Khazaei; Elena Ahmadian; Mobina Bereihi	Girls	Uzbekistan; W 22–6	Jordan; W 21–6	China; L 13–20	United Arab Emirates; W 21–3	Kazakhstan; W 21–10	Chinese Taipei; W 11–9	3 Q	India; W 15–10	China; W 21–19	Chinese Taipei; L 14–15	2nd place, silver medalist(s)

=== Athletics ===
Athlete	Event	Round 1		Semifinal		Final	Rank
Athlete	Event	Time	Rank	Time	Rank	Time / Result	Rank
Mohammad Hassan Darvishi	Boys' 100 m	11.02	2 Q	10.92	5 q	11.08	8
Amir Asgari	Boys' 400 m hurdles	56.86	5	—N/a		Did not advance	9
Mohammad Alidousti	Boys' 2000 m steeplechase	—N/a				6:06.73	3rd place, bronze medalist(s)
Alireza Samimi	Boys' discus throw	—N/a				53.86 m	3rd place, bronze medalist(s)
Ali Asghar Shahi	Boys' discus throw	—N/a				52.93 m	5
Hasti Norouzi	Girls' 400 m	58.17	6	—N/a		Did not advance	10
Raha Ahmadi	Girls' 2000 m steeplechase	—N/a				7:32.99	5
Saba Ezzatabadipour	Girls' shot put	—N/a				14.55 m	5

=== Badminton ===
Athlete	Event	Round of 64	Round of 32	Round of 16	Quarterfinal	Semifinal	Final	Rank
Zahra Robati	Girls' singles	Bye	Yin (CHN); L 0–2 (9–21, 3–21)	Did not advance				17

=== Boxing ===
Athlete	Event	Round of 32	Round of 16	Quarterfinal	Semifinal	Final	Rank
Matin Chamipa	Boys' 54 kg	Boronov (TJK); W 5–0	Arslanow (TKM); W 4–1	Lee (KOR); W 5–0	Al-Mashaleh (JOR); W 5–0	Zhumakan (KAZ); L 2–3	2nd place, silver medalist(s)
Amir Ali Mehrabi	Boys' 60 kg	Duhan (IND); W 5–0	Sakuno (JPN); L 1–4	Did not advance			9
Farzan Ahmadi	Boys' 66 kg	—N/a	Mairanbekov (KGZ); W 5–0	Bazarow (TKM); W 5–0	Sadillakhujaev (UZB); L 1–4	Did not advance	3rd place, bronze medalist(s)
Mehrshad Sherafatmand	Boys' 75 kg	—N/a	Mairambekov (KGZ); W RSC	Nozimov (TJK); W 4–0	Guan (CHN); W 5–0	Murodilloev (UZB); L 0–5	2nd place, silver medalist(s)
Farhoud Ghorbani	Boys' +80 kg	—N/a	Bye	Burkhonov (TJK); W RSCI	Rustembek (KAZ); L 0–5	Did not advance	3rd place, bronze medalist(s)
Nazanin Davoudi	Girls' 54 kg	—N/a	Wang (CHN); L 0–5	Did not advance			9
Yekta Sahraei	Girls' 75 kg	—N/a		Bye	Turgunova (UZB); L 0–5	Did not advance	3rd place, bronze medalist(s)
Fatemeh Rastegar	Girls' +80 kg	—N/a		Bye	Kongyrat (KAZ); L RSC	Did not advance	3rd place, bronze medalist(s)

=== Cycling ===
Athlete	Event	Time	Rank
Hesam Heidari	Boys' road race	2:26:45	46
Ali Jahanbanian	Boys' road race	2:24:15	11
Amir Pouyan Koneshloo	Boys' road race	2:24:17	17
Ali Jahanbanian	Boys' individual time trial	23:48.94	16
Raha Bajelan	Girls' road race	1:59:30	14
Elena Nasseri	Girls' road race	1:59:41	30
Narvin Zeinali	Girls' road race	1:59:30	13
Raha Bajelan	Girls' individual time trial	18:21.22	10
Hesam Heidari; Ali Jahanbanian; Amir Pouyan Koneshloo; Raha Bajelan; Elena Nasseri; Narvin Zeinali	Mixed team time trial relay	Did not finish	—

=== Esports ===
Athlete	Event	Preliminary round					Quarterfinal	Semifinal	Final	Rank
Athlete	Event	Round 1	Round 2	Round 3	Round 4	Rank	Quarterfinal	Semifinal	Final	Rank
Rasoul Ahmadi	Boys' eFootball	Sharabadin (KAZ); W 1–0	Al-Abed (JOR); W 1–0	Al-Sharari (KSA); L 0–1	Rungratkasikul (THA); L 0–1	3	Did not advance			9
Amir Mohammad Farahani	Boys' eFootball	Acharya (NEP); W 1–0	Benazirzoda (TJK); W 1–0	Sativaldiev (KGZ); W 1–0	Luzman (MAS); W 1–0	1 Q	Al-Sharari (KSA); W 2–1	Cezar (INA); L 1–2	Qusay (IRQ); W 3–2	3rd place, bronze medalist(s)

=== Futsal ===
Team	Event	Preliminary round / Round robin					Semifinal	Final	Rank
Team	Event	Round 1	Round 2	Round 3	Round 4	Rank	Semifinal	Final	Rank
Iran	Boys	Kyrgyzstan; W 5–1	Saudi Arabia; W 14–0	Thailand; D 3–3	—N/a	1 Q	Uzbekistan; W 14–2	Afghanistan; L 1–2	2nd place, silver medalist(s)
Iran	Girls	Hong Kong; W 6–0	Bahrain; W 14–0	Chinese Taipei; D 0–0	China; D 2–2	2 Q	Chinese Taipei; W 2–2 (3–1 P)	China; W 0–0 (3–2 P)	1st place, gold medalist(s)
Roster – Boys: Mohammad Ali Shekarchi; Mohammad Amin Safaei; Saeid Fakhrani; Abolfazl Zamani; Sadra Choupani; Hossein Reza Yousefi; Amir Hossein Mostasharnejad; Amir Hossein Abdolrazzaghi; Ali Ahmadi; Mohammad Javad Norouzi; Mohammad Hossein Gharibi; Mohammad Arshia Atef; Amir Hossein Dahipour; Mohammad Matin Karami; Coach: Ali Saneei Roster – Girls: Elina Mansouri; Niayesh Rahmani; Nafiseh Mohammadi; Ghazal Rahmani; Sarina Zare; Tannaz Bagheri; Hadis Yari; Fatemeh Abbasi; Setayesh Rezaei; Narges Amirmohseni; Zahra Amini; Fatemeh Shokrani; Aynaz Yazdipour; Elnaz Hosseinipour; Coach: Fatemeh Sharif

=== Golf ===
Athlete	Event	Round 1		Round 2		Round 3		Total (To par)	Rank
Athlete	Event	Score	Rank	Score	Rank	Score	Rank	Total (To par)	Rank
Soshiant Sadeghi	Boys' individual	88	44	88	46	Did not advance		176 (+32)	47

=== Handball ===
Team	Event	Preliminary round / Round robin							Semifinal	Final	Rank
Team	Event	Round 1	Round 2	Round 3	Round 4	Round 5	Round 6	Rank	Semifinal	Final	Rank
Iran	Boys	Thailand; W 42–12	China; W 20–17	Kazakhstan; W 45–25	United Arab Emirates; W 36–12	Kuwait; L 19–24	—N/a	3	Did not advance		5
Iran	Girls	China; W 30–25	Uzbekistan; W 27–24	Kazakhstan; W 27–23	Thailand; W 32–16	India; W 43–26	Hong Kong; W 37–21	1st place, gold medalist(s)	—N/a		
Roster – Boys: Mohammad Hossein Kamali; Saleh Hessehzadeh; Amir Hassan Penhaneh; Danial Mirhosseini; Hassan Joudaki; Parsa Babapour; Mehdi Ahmadifar; Pedram Parmah; Mohammad Taha Fattahi; Arshia Javidi; Shahrokh Alizadeh; Mohammad Taha Khanlari; Mohammad Keshavarz; Shayan Sousani; Amir Hossein Nikeghbal; Mehdi Jamali; Coach: Azizollah Nourbehbahani Roster – Girls: Fatemeh Olfatnia; Diana Rezaei; Tina Khoshnejad; Negar Babasafari; Fatemeh Behzadi; Sarina Rostami; Sana Fotouhi; Dina Derakhshanmehr; Reihaneh Hosseini; Hasti Arianfar; Aseman Badvi; Arezoo Taleei; Parisan Ahmadkhosravi; Hasti Sheikhalizadeh; Zahra Afshari; Melika Safikhani; Coach: Khadijeh Ghane

=== Judo ===
Athlete	Event	Round of 32	Round of 16	Quarterfinal	Semifinal	Final	Rank
Mohammad Reza Kazemi	Boys' 50 kg	—N/a	Usmonov (UZB); L 000–100	Did not advance			9
Abolfazl Nazari	Boys' 55 kg	—N/a	Ibragimov (KGZ); W 101–001	Pitarapa (THA); W 102–000	Sattorov (UZB); L 000–101	3rd place match Chang (TPE); W 100–000	3rd place, bronze medalist(s)
Mohammad Amin Babadi	Boys' 60 kg	Bye	Huang (TPE); L 000–001	Did not advance			9
Amir Ali Heidari	Boys' 66 kg	—N/a	Yerken (KAZ); L 000–110	Did not advance			9
Sobhan Hakimi	Boys' 73 kg	—N/a	Bye	Sawutdee (THA); W 100–000	Khudoykulov (UZB); L 000–101	3rd place match Al-Jadi (KUW); W 110–000	3rd place, bronze medalist(s)
Hossein Novin	Boys' 81 kg	—N/a	Bye	Temüülen (MGL); W 100–000	Kadyrbaev (KGZ); L 000–001	3rd place match Zhumabay (KAZ); W 101–001	3rd place, bronze medalist(s)
Mohammad Barfaraz	Boys' 90 kg	—N/a	Bye	Eshpulatov (UZB); L 000–100	Repechage; Yrysdolotov (KGZ); W WO	3rd place match Kumar (IND); W 010–000	3rd place, bronze medalist(s)
Mahsa Shakibaei	Girls' 48 kg	—N/a	Octa (INA); W 112–000	Wshah (JOR); W 100–000	Das (IND); W 110–000	Baltabay (KAZ); W 100–001	1st place, gold medalist(s)
Mohanna Kamgouei	Girls' 70 kg	—N/a		Turaeva (UZB); L 000–101	Repechage; Kanaeva (KGZ); W 100–000	3rd place match Buyanjargal (MGL); L 000–100	5

=== Kabaddi ===
Team	Event	Round robin							Final	Rank
Team	Event	Round 1	Round 2	Round 3	Round 4	Round 5	Round 6	Rank	Final	Rank
Iran	Boys	Thailand; W 72–29	Bangladesh; L 48–55	Pakistan; W 74–21	Bahrain; W 92–17	India; L 29–46	Sri Lanka; W 92–23	2 Q	India; L 32–35	2nd place, silver medalist(s)
Iran	Girls	Sri Lanka; W 54–26	Bangladesh; W 33–19	India; L 26–59	Thailand; W 61–35	—N/a		2 Q	India; L 21–75	2nd place, silver medalist(s)
Roster – Boys: Mahdiar Avarseji; Ali Asadpour; Bardia Babapour; Mehdi Ghahremani; Mohammad Hadi Hassannejad; Hossein Nasseri; Saleh Malekzadeh; Mohsen Hamoudi; Amir Ali Khalili; Alireza Rezaeimehr; Amir Arsalan Shahraki; Saleh Shahkouhmahalli; Taha Eslami; Amir Ali Pournikghalb; Coach: Javad Mousavi Roster – Girls: Aysan Ghasemi; Hasti Keshavarzi; Mahsa Borounli; Zahra Shahsavan; Mobina Madadi; Elistar Shokri; Fatemeh Abbaszadeh; Mohanna Khalili; Shadi Ashrafi; Fereshteh Kolagar; Kiana Fazeli; Respina Mohebbi; Faezeh Moradi; Paria Hoshyar; Coach: Mahrokh Danesh

=== Kurash ===
Athlete	Event	Round of 16	Quarterfinal	Semifinal	Final	Rank
Yousef Baghcheghi	Boys' 65 kg	Bye	Ohri (IND); W 011–000	Mohammadi (AFG); W 100–001	Yuldashboev (UZB); L 000–002	2nd place, silver medalist(s)
Mehrab Mokarrami	Boys' 83 kg	Bye	Babanto (PHI); W 111–001	Nazari (AFG); W 100–000	Golibov (UZB); L 000–112	2nd place, silver medalist(s)
Setayesh Jalaleddin	Girls' 52 kg	Bye	Putri (INA); W 100–000	Bidhuri (IND); L 000–100	Did not advance	3rd place, bronze medalist(s)
Mahsa Barzegar	Girls' 70 kg	—N/a	Bacani (PHI); W 100–000	Talaibekova (KGZ); L 000–100	Did not advance	3rd place, bronze medalist(s)

=== Mixed martial arts ===
Modern

Athlete	Event	Round of 16	Quarterfinal	Semifinal	Final	Rank
Hossein Ghorbani	Boys' 55 kg	Ergashov (KGZ); L UD	Did not advance			9
Ali Asghar Moradi	Boys' 60 kg	Tayih (JOR); W WO	Al-Zahrani (KSA); W MD	Eldarov (BRN); L WO	Did not advance	3rd place, bronze medalist(s)
Amir Ali Aliabadi	Boys' 65 kg	Babaev (BRN); L UD	Did not advance			9
Abolfazl Fotouhi	Boys' 70 kg	—N/a	Mustafin (KAZ); L UD	Did not advance		8
Aylin Abbasnejad	Girls' 45 kg	—N/a	Siagian (INA); L MD	Did not advance		6
Vania Fathalipour	Girls' 55 kg	—N/a	Bye	Kalandarbekova (TJK); W UD	Takada (JPN); W SD	1st place, gold medalist(s)

Traditional

Athlete	Event	Round of 16	Quarterfinal	Semifinal		Final	Rank
Amir Mohammad Hatamian	Boys' 60 kg	Bye	Zaiyrbekov (KGZ); W UD	Basroni (INA); W UD		Ratcliff (PHI); W UD	1st place, gold medalist(s)
Mahyar Shafaei	Boys' 65 kg	—N/a	Alfarizi (INA); L UD	Did not advance			7
Ilia Vahedi	Boys' 70 kg	—N/a	Fallatah (KSA); W SD	Qayomi (AFG); W DSQ		Umed (TJK); L MD	2nd place, silver medalist(s)
Amir Mehdi Vazifeh	Boys' 80 kg	—N/a	Group round Bhadu (IND); W SUB	Group round Barisri (THA); W SUB	Rank; 1 Q	Otegen (KAZ); W SUB	1st place, gold medalist(s)
Kamand Karamzad	Girls' 50 kg	—N/a	Group round Bakiyeva (KAZ); L UD	Group round Fozilova (TJK); W MD	Rank; 2	Did not advance	3rd place, bronze medalist(s)
Tiam Dehpahlavan	Girls' 60 kg	—N/a	Group round Khanttisurin (THA); W UD	Group round Boboeva (TJK); W SD	Rank; 1 Q	Ölziitnaran (MGL); W UD	1st place, gold medalist(s)

=== Muaythai ===
Wai kru

Athlete	Event	Qualification		Final	
Athlete	Event	Score	Rank	Score	Rank
Amir Abbas Saghari	Boys' wai kru (U15)	8.20	4 Q	8.40	3rd place, bronze medalist(s)
Taha Sharifi	Boys' wai kru (U17)	8.13	4 Q	8.20	3rd place, bronze medalist(s)
Sevda Aghaei	Girls' wai kru (U15)	8.07	4 Q	8.16	3rd place, bronze medalist(s)
Kiana Hemmati	Girls' wai kru (U17)	8.03	5	Did not advance	
Faraz Banisaeid; Mohammad Rouhi	Open mai muay	7.27	6	Did not advance	

Combat

Athlete	Event	Round of 32	Round of 16	Quarterfinal	Semifinal	Final	Rank
Abolfazl Hajivand	Boys' 45 kg (U15)	—N/a	Hoikaeo (THA); W 30–27	Ibrakhim (KAZ); W 30–27	Faiz (MAS); W RSCH	Qaed (IRQ); L 27–30	2nd place, silver medalist(s)
Akam Ahmadi	Boys' 48 kg (U15)	—N/a	Al-Shammari (KUW); W WO	Maslovets (KGZ); L 27–30	Did not advance		5
Esmaeil Jafari	Boys' 51 kg (U15)	—N/a	Salimov (TJK); W 30–27	Thorn (CAM); L WO	Did not advance		5
Reza Bakhshi	Boys' 54 kg (U17)	Bye	Jumah (KUW); W RSCS	Mohammed (IRQ); L 27–30	Did not advance		5
Amir Mohammad Majidinia	Boys' 57 kg (U17)	—N/a	Dương (VIE); W 30–27	Nairoukh (JOR); W 30–27	Inkong (THA); L 28–29	Did not advance	3rd place, bronze medalist(s)
Yasin Mousavi	Boys' 60 kg (U17)	—N/a	Chaikazanov (KAZ); W 30–27	Sangov (TJK); W 30–27	Qutaiba (IRQ); W 30–27	Ahmad (JOR); L RSCS	2nd place, silver medalist(s)
Baran Jani	Girls' 40 kg (U15)	—N/a		Bye	Al-Hayek (JOR); W RSCS	Kanyaburi (THA); W 29–28	1st place, gold medalist(s)
Maedeh Sadeghzadeh	Girls' 45 kg (U15)	—N/a	Ozora (INA); W 30–26	Beishenalieva (KGZ); W 29–28	Mekdashi (LBN); L 27–30	Did not advance	3rd place, bronze medalist(s)
Rojan Behnami	Girls' 48 kg (U15)	—N/a	Bye	Anoma (THA); W CCL	Al-Amani (MAS); W CCL	Nguyễn (VIE); W 30–26	1st place, gold medalist(s)
Mohaddeseh Sheibani	Girls' 48 kg (U17)	—N/a	Bye	Izbaskan (KAZ); L 27–30	Did not advance		5
Hannaneh Taghipour	Girls' 51 kg (U17)	—N/a		Om (CAM); L 27–30	Did not advance		5
Dorsa Farshadpour	Girls' 54 kg (U17)	—N/a	Achilova (UZB); L 27–30	Did not advance			9

=== Pencak silat ===
Athlete	Event	Round of 16	Quarterfinal	Semifinal	Final	Rank
Alireza Mortazi	Boys' 63 kg	—N/a	Al-Sabaie (BRN); W 46–3	Bikboev (KGZ); L 4–23	Did not advance	3rd place, bronze medalist(s)
Nazanin Kolasangiani	Girls' 55 kg	Carpio (PHI); L 22–36	Did not advance			9

=== Swimming ===
Athlete	Event	Heats		Final	
Athlete	Event	Time	Rank	Time	Rank
Danial Jahangiri	Boys' 50 m freestyle	24.36	15	Did not advance	
Yashar Soleimani	Boys' 50 m freestyle	24.78	23	Did not advance	
Danial Jahangiri	Boys' 100 m freestyle	52.07	9	Did not advance	
Yashar Soleimani	Boys' 100 m freestyle	53.91	19	Did not advance	
Danial Jahangiri	Boys' 200 m freestyle	1:54.55	7 Q	1:54.55	7
Danial Jahangiri	Boys' 400 m freestyle	4:01.94	7 Q	Withdrew	9
Mohammad Mehdi Gholami	Boys' 50 m backstroke	27.03	9	Did not advance	
Parsa Shahshahani	Boys' 50 m backstroke	27.60	14	Did not advance	
Mohammad Mehdi Gholami	Boys' 100 m backstroke	57.72	4 Q	58.07	7
Parsa Shahshahani	Boys' 100 m backstroke	58.18	8 Q	58.46	8
Parsa Shahshahani	Boys' 200 m backstroke	2:05.50	2 Q	2:04.82	5
Alireza Arab	Boys' 50 m breaststroke	29.51	6 Q	29.49	6
Alireza Arab	Boys' 100 m breaststroke	1:05.49	9	Did not advance	
Alireza Arab	Boys' 200 m breaststroke	2:25.70	14	Did not advance	
Mohammad Mehdi Gholami	Boys' 50 m butterfly	25.39	7 Q	25.17	5
Yashar Soleimani	Boys' 50 m butterfly	25.90	15	Did not advance	
Mohammad Mehdi Gholami	Boys' 100 m butterfly	55.39	1 Q	54.75	1st place, gold medalist(s)
Yashar Soleimani	Boys' 100 m butterfly	58.41	16	Did not advance	
Mohammad Mehdi Gholami	Boys' 200 m butterfly	2:03.52	1 Q	2:01.75	1st place, gold medalist(s)
Danial Jahangiri; Mohammad Mehdi Gholami; Yashar Soleimani; Alireza Arab	Boys' 4 × 100 m freestyle relay	3:33.60	8 Q	3:33.39	8
Parsa Shahshahani; Alireza Arab; Mohammad Mehdi Gholami; Danial Jahangiri	Boys' 4 × 100 m medley relay	DSQ	—	Did not advance	

=== Table tennis ===
Athlete	Event	Preliminary round				Round of 64	Round of 32	Round of 16	Quarterfinal	Semifinal	Final	Rank
Athlete	Event	Round 1	Round 2	Round 3	Rank	Round of 64	Round of 32	Round of 16	Quarterfinal	Semifinal	Final	Rank
Mobin Amiri	Boys' singles	Paculba (PHI); W 3–1 (−5, 8, 12, 9)	Al-Hawai (UAE); W 3–1 (−9, 3, 6, 12)	—N/a	1 Q	Bye	Rawat (IND); W 3–2 (13, 5, −4, −14, 9)	Tang (CHN); L 0–3 (−10, −7, −6)	Did not advance			9
Benyamin Faraji	Boys' singles	Törmönkh (MGL); W 3–0 (3, 2, 2)	Lamkimna (CAM); W 3–0 (3, 3, 11)	—N/a	1 Q	Bye	Quindo (PHI); W 3–0 (4, 2, 5)	Man (HKG); W 3–0 (11, 9, 5)	Ma (KOR); W 3–0 (8, 8, 7)	Li (CHN); L 0–4 (−12, −4, −10, −5)	Did not advance	3rd place, bronze medalist(s)
Vania Yavari	Girls' singles	Yaaqeib (UAE); W 3–0 (2, 0, 5)	Cheah (MAS); W 3–1 (−6, 7, 7, 7)	Al-Dubai (YEM); W 3–0 (0, 1, 2)	1 Q	—N/a	Chua (PHI); W 3–0 (5, 2, 4)	Wu (TPE); L 1–3 (10, −7, −2, −2)	Did not advance			9

=== Taekwondo ===
Poomsae

Athlete	Event	Round of 32	Round of 16	Quarterfinal	Semifinal	Final	Rank
Mohammad Amin Habibzadeh	Boys' individual freestyle	—N/a				Score: 7.14	3rd place, bronze medalist(s)
Behdad Naghiei	Boys' individual recognized	—N/a	Calde (PHI); W 8.51–8.39	Hsieh (TPE); W 8.56–8.51	Thongdee (THA); W 8.69–8.54	Gao (CHN); W 8.76–8.48	1st place, gold medalist(s)
Sana Shaygan	Girls' individual freestyle	—N/a				Score: 6.90	3rd place, bronze medalist(s)
Zeinab Shahriari	Girls' individual recognized	Bye	Koh (SGP); W 8.40–8.13	Cheung (HKG); W 8.47–8.20	Lin (TPE); W 8.62–8.44	Aguila (PHI); W 8.86–8.60	1st place, gold medalist(s)
Mohammad Amin Habibzadeh; Sana Shaygan	Mixed pair freestyle	—N/a				Score: 6.88	3rd place, bronze medalist(s)
Behdad Naghiei; Zeinab Shahriari	Mixed pair recognized	—N/a	Qadri and Zainab (PAK); W 8.45–7.78	Lee and Myeong (KOR); W 8.65–8.52	Lee and Liou (TPE); W 8.63–8.61	Yimprasert and Injang (THA); W 8.78–8.69	1st place, gold medalist(s)

Kyorugi

Athlete	Event	Round of 32	Round of 16	Quarterfinal	Semifinal	Final	Rank
Taha Javadi	Boys' 48 kg	Al-Shahrani (KSA); L 0–2 (11–9^{P}, 3–9)	Did not advance				17
Bahamin Poustindouz	Boys' 55 kg	Bye	Bahodur (TJK); L 0–2 (10–16, 7–12)	Did not advance			9
Amir Eghbali	Boys' 63 kg	Lam (HKG); W 2–0 (11–6, 14–0)	Mohsen (BRN); W 2–0 (12–0, 16–4)	Makhmut (KAZ); L 0–2 (6–16, 5–10)	Did not advance		5
Mohammad Javad Geryan	Boys' 73 kg	Bye	Cheng (HKG); W 2–0 (16–1, 13–1)	Reddy (IND); W 2–0 (5–2, 9–3)	Shamuratov (KAZ); L 1–2 (0–1, 2–0, 2–3)	Did not advance	3rd place, bronze medalist(s)
Mohammad Hossein Taghipour	Boys' +73 kg	Shaptefrats (KAZ); L RSC (12–8, 2–5, 0–1)	Did not advance				17
Bahar Tahmasebi	Girls' 44 kg	Zatul Ikram (MAS); W 2–0 (7–0, 9–0)	Liu (CHN); W 2–1 (7–10, 5–4, 9–9)	Al-Abdallat (JOR); L 0–2 (8–9, 2–10)	Did not advance		5
Helia Ebrahimian	Girls' 49 kg	Cadeliña (PHI); W WO	Ritigahapola (SRI); W 2–0 (12–0, 12–0)	Li (CHN); L 0–2 (4–10, 1–10)	Did not advance		5
Dina Babarahim	Girls' 55 kg	Bye	Choi (KOR); W 2–0 (9–0, 5–3)	Tamanit (THA); W 2–0 (2–0, 6–0)	Xu (CHN); L 0–2 (2–6, 2–8)	Did not advance	3rd place, bronze medalist(s)
Pinar Lotfizadeh	Girls' 63 kg	—N/a	Chaykun (SGP); W 2–0 (10–1, 13–0)	Gaa (PHI); W 2–0 (6–0, 13–0)	Busila (JOR); W 2–0 (4–3, 7–4)	Guo (CHN); L 1–2 (0–6, 4–3, 0–3)	2nd place, silver medalist(s)
Asal Goltappeh	Girls' +63 kg	—N/a	Ernazarova (UZB); W 2–1 (5–4, 4–5, 10–2)	Shetty (IND); W 2–0 (13–0, 12–0)	Al-Bqowr (JOR); W 2–0 (6–0, 7–0)	Zhang (CHN); L 0–2 (2–3, 0–0)	2nd place, silver medalist(s)
Amir Eghbali; Mohammad Javad Geryan; Asal Goltappeh; Pinar Lotfizadeh	Mixed team	—N/a	Vietnam; W WO	Uzbekistan; W 2–1 (11–19, 17–7, 24–10)	China; L 1–2 (10–12, 16–13, 9–16)	Did not advance	3rd place, bronze medalist(s)

=== Triathlon ===
Athlete	Event	Time	Rank
Parsa Rasouli	Boys' super sprint	27:13	4

=== Volleyball ===
==== Beach ====
Athlete	Event	Preliminary round						Quarterfinal	Semifinal	Final	Rank
Athlete	Event	Round 1	Round 2	Round 3	Round 4	Round 5	Rank	Quarterfinal	Semifinal	Final	Rank
Mahan Jahanifar; Abolfazl Marzban	Boys	Tan and Adnan (MAS); W 2–0 (21–15, 21–16)	Al-Jorfi and Al-Awami (KSA); W 2–0 (21–12, 21–11)	Xin and Ma (CHN); L 1–2 (21–15, 19–21, 13–15)	Agabek and Sagynysh (KAZ); L 1–2 (21–14, 14–21, 13–15)	Anand and Onon (MGL); W 2–0 (21–14, 21–9)	3 Q	Nuruddin and Bayhaqly (INA); L 0–2 (17–21, 10–21)	Did not advance		5

==== Indoor ====
Team	Event	Preliminary round			Second round			Quarterfinal	Semifinal	Final	Rank
Team	Event	Round 1	Round 2	Rank	Round 1	Round 2	Rank	Quarterfinal	Semifinal	Final	Rank
Iran	Boys	China; W 3–0 (25–9, 25–12, 25–19)	Qatar; W 3–0 (25–12, 25–8, 25–13)	1 Q	Thailand; W 3–0 (25–19, 25–10, 25–16)	Indonesia; W 3–0 (25–21, 25–16, 25–20)	1 Q	Mongolia; W 3–1 (25–21, 22–25, 25–12, 25–15)	Thailand; W 3–0 (25–10, 25–21, 25–14)	Pakistan; W 3–0 (25–21, 25–23, 25–23)	1st place, gold medalist(s)
Iran	Girls	Qatar; W 3–0 (25–6, 25–4, 25–6)	Bahrain; W 3–0 (25–4, 25–2, 25–2)	1 Q	Chinese Taipei; W 3–1 (25–13, 24–26, 25–20, 25–15)	Indonesia; W 3–0 (25–18, 25–21, 25–22)	1 Q	Hong Kong; W 3–0 (25–14, 25–13, 25–18)	Philippines; W 3–1 (26–28, 25–18, 25–19, 25–18)	Indonesia; W 3–2 (28–26, 20–25, 18–25, 25–17, 16–14)	1st place, gold medalist(s)
Roster – Boys: Mohammad Amin Rahimi; Mohammad Nima Bateni; Hossein Zamani; Amir Mohammad Ramezani; Mirmohammad Mousavi; Mobin Kolasangiani; Amir Naderi; Mehdi Sakhavi; Amir Mohammad Rafieirad; Armin Asiaei; Parsa Gallehdar; Shantia Behnejad; Coach: Adel Gholami Roster – Girls: Ayda Baghernia; Yalda Jafari; Laya Afzouni; Hasti Vahedi; Yasna Ahankoub; Masoumeh Ghadami; Setayesh Hosseini; Negar Hosseini; Ayda Valinejad; Mobina Karimi; Negar Abbasi; Elena Homayounirad; Coach: (South Korea) Lee Do-hee

=== Weightlifting ===
Athlete	Event	Snatch		Clean & Jerk		Total	
Athlete	Event	Result	Rank	Result	Rank	Result	Rank
Mehdi Pourghasemi	Boys' 79 kg	NM	—	NM	—	NM	—
Behnoud Nosrati	Boys' 88 kg	NM	—	173	3rd place, bronze medalist(s)	NM	—
Amin Adibi	Boys' 94 kg	141	4	172	4	313	4
Hossein Yazdani	Boys' +94 kg	151	3rd place, bronze medalist(s)	201	1st place, gold medalist(s)	352	2
Zahra Pouramin	Girls' 48 kg	64	9	81	7	145	8
Maryam Keshtkar	Girls' 58 kg	NM	—	96	4	NM	—
Hasti Sedighi	Girls' 63 kg	78	5	105	3rd place, bronze medalist(s)	183	4
Zahra Hosseini	Girls' 69 kg	92	3rd place, bronze medalist(s)	121	3rd place, bronze medalist(s)	213	3
Nasim Ghasemi	Girls' 77 kg	94	2nd place, silver medalist(s)	114	2nd place, silver medalist(s)	208	2
Mahsa Beheshti	Girls' +77 kg	105	3rd place, bronze medalist(s)	136	4	241	3

=== Wrestling ===
==== Beach ====
Athlete	Event	Knockout	Group round				Semifinal	Final	Rank
Athlete	Event	Knockout	Round 1	Round 2	Round 3	Rank	Semifinal	Final	Rank
Amir Ali Domirkolaei	Boys' 60 kg	Bye	Musleh (JOR); W 3–0	Songmueangsuk (THA); W Fall (3–0)	Ochir (MGL); W 3–0	1 Q	Lâm (VIE); W 3–1	Fulmali (IND); L 0–3	2nd place, silver medalist(s)
Sina Shokouhi	Boys' 70 kg	Perez (PHI); W 3–1	Al-Kayyadi (KSA); W 3–0	Bakhromov (TJK); W 3–0	Qahtan (BRN); W 3–0	1 Q	Ali (PAK); W 3–2	Tanpure (IND); W 3–1	1st place, gold medalist(s)
Touraj Khodaei	Boys' 80 kg	—N/a	Bakhromov (TJK); W 3–0	Naghouj (JOR); W 3–0	—N/a	1 Q	Abdul Rehman (PAK); W 3–0	Ravinder (IND); W 3–1	1st place, gold medalist(s)
Mohammad Mehdi Fotouhi	Boys' 90 kg	—N/a	Choe (KOR); W 3–0	Phạm (VIE); W 3–0	Dahshan (JOR); W 4–0	1 Q	Al-Muwallad (KSA); W 3–0	Ruhil (IND); L 2–3	2nd place, silver medalist(s)

==== Wrestling ====
Freestyle

Athlete	Event	Round of 32	Round of 16	Quarterfinal	Semifinal	Final	Rank
Parsa Tahmasebi	Boys' 45 kg	—N/a	Furusawa (JPN); W 8–6	Huang (CHN); W 8–2	Agabek (KAZ); W 7–1	Mukanbetov (KGZ); W 6–2	1st place, gold medalist(s)
Sina Boustani	Boys' 48 kg	—N/a	Bye	Ushimado (JPN); L 0–5	Repechage; Sabuelo (PHI); W Fall (10–0)	3rd place match Nursaidov (KGZ); L 0–5	5
Arman Elahi	Boys' 51 kg	—N/a	Bye	Sarybaev (KGZ); W 5–0	Davlatov (TJK); W 6–4	Rashidov (UZB); L 4–4	2nd place, silver medalist(s)
Yasin Zarezadeh	Boys' 55 kg	Bye	Al-Mutawa (BRN); W 10–0	Singh (IND); L 4–4	Repechage; Dulanjana (SRI); W 10–0	3rd place match Yskakbek (KAZ); L 0–10	5
Taha Hashemi	Boys' 60 kg	Bye	Qahtan (BRN); W WO	Sarwari (AFG); W 8–7	Assambek (KAZ); L 4–6	3rd place match Ibronov (TJK); W 9–3	3rd place, bronze medalist(s)
Morteza Hajmollamohammadi	Boys' 65 kg	—N/a	Calawen (PHI); W 10–0	Ganiev (KGZ); W Fall (11–2)	Aliev (UZB); W 6–4	Punia (IND); W 4–1	1st place, gold medalist(s)
Amir Mohammad Zarinkam	Boys' 71 kg	—N/a	Salud (PHI); W 12–0	Jumanazarov (UZB); W 4–3	Bozorzoda (TJK); W 8–3	Kobayashi (JPN); W 11–0	1st place, gold medalist(s)
Mohammad Parsa Karami	Boys' 80 kg	—N/a	Zeng (CHN); W 10–0	Yadav (IND); W 9–4	Rufatov (UZB); L 0–10	3rd place match Shiotsuka (JPN); W 4–0	3rd place, bronze medalist(s)
