= Muaythai at the 2025 Asian Youth Games =

- Venue: Exhibition World Bahrain
- Dates: 23–26 October 2025

Muaythai at the 2025 Asian Youth Games was held in Sakhir, Bahrain from 23 to 26 October 2025 at the Exhibition World Bahrain. It was the debuting appearance of the sport.

== Medalists ==
=== Under-15 ===
Event	Gold	Silver	Bronze
Boys' wai kru	Zeth Gabriel Bueno; Philippines	Daonuea Phuangmali; Thailand	Jaethan Quan; Malaysia
Boys' wai kru	Zeth Gabriel Bueno; Philippines	Daonuea Phuangmali; Thailand	Amir Abbas Saghari; Iran
Boys' 45 kg	Mahdi Qaed; Iraq	Abolfazl Hajivand; Iran	Doston Abduvaliev; Uzbekistan
Boys' 45 kg	Mahdi Qaed; Iraq	Abolfazl Hajivand; Iran	Haikal Faiz; Malaysia
Boys' 48 kg	Abdullah Osamah; Iraq	Suwachat Kongsawat; Thailand	Trần Quốc Bảo; Vietnam
Boys' 48 kg	Abdullah Osamah; Iraq	Suwachat Kongsawat; Thailand	Ramis Maslovets; Kyrgyzstan
Boys' 51 kg	Asadbek Turdiboev; Uzbekistan	Ridha Qayssar; Iraq	Kotaro Nomoto; Japan
Boys' 51 kg	Asadbek Turdiboev; Uzbekistan	Ridha Qayssar; Iraq	Thorn Chanthou; Cambodia
Girls' wai kru	Lyre Anie Ngina; Philippines	Auryelle Xzandra Bobby; Malaysia	Kittima Yotsombat; Thailand
Girls' wai kru	Lyre Anie Ngina; Philippines	Auryelle Xzandra Bobby; Malaysia	Sevda Aghaei; Iran
Girls' 40 kg	Baran Jani; Iran	Natthida Kanyaburi; Thailand	Salina Al-Hayek; Jordan
Girls' 40 kg	Baran Jani; Iran	Natthida Kanyaburi; Thailand	Aisulu Kovaleva; Kazakhstan
Girls' 45 kg	Vivian Allis; Palestine	Hala Mekdashi; Lebanon	Adina Sailau; Kazakhstan
Girls' 45 kg	Vivian Allis; Palestine	Hala Mekdashi; Lebanon	Maedeh Sadeghzadeh; Iran
Girls' 48 kg	Rojan Behnami; Iran	Nguyễn Thị Thu Phương; Vietnam	Mia Nur Al-Amani; Malaysia
Girls' 48 kg	Rojan Behnami; Iran	Nguyễn Thị Thu Phương; Vietnam	Kamila Abdolda; Kazakhstan

=== Under-17 ===
Event	Gold	Silver	Bronze
Boys' wai kru	Pimpichien Chaiwan; Thailand	Jan Brix Ramiscal; Philippines	Sajjad Hamzah; Iraq
Boys' wai kru	Pimpichien Chaiwan; Thailand	Jan Brix Ramiscal; Philippines	Taha Sharifi; Iran
Boys' 54 kg	Muzaffar Nurkhujaev; Uzbekistan	Chhong Visal; Cambodia	Ibrahim Mohammed; Iraq
Boys' 54 kg	Muzaffar Nurkhujaev; Uzbekistan	Chhong Visal; Cambodia	Myagmaryn Byambatsogt; Mongolia
Boys' 57 kg	Issam Aymen Khaleel; United Arab Emirates	Thitiphong Inkong; Thailand	Amir Mohammad Majidinia; Iran
Boys' 57 kg	Issam Aymen Khaleel; United Arab Emirates	Thitiphong Inkong; Thailand	Al-Motasim Bin Salem; Saudi Arabia
Boys' 60 kg	Rayan Ahmad; Jordan	Yasin Mousavi; Iran	Mustafa Qutaiba; Iraq
Boys' 60 kg	Rayan Ahmad; Jordan	Yasin Mousavi; Iran	Shakhruz Davronov; Uzbekistan
Girls' wai kru	Rungthipwa Koakaw; Thailand	Jasmine Dagame; Philippines	Ariesya Dania Abdul Latip; Malaysia
Girls' wai kru	Rungthipwa Koakaw; Thailand	Jasmine Dagame; Philippines	Alphonsa Wriang; India
Girls' 48 kg	Niracha Tangchio; Thailand	Aya Chaari; United Arab Emirates	Xie Jiaxin; China
Girls' 48 kg	Niracha Tangchio; Thailand	Aya Chaari; United Arab Emirates	Adiya Izbaskan; Kazakhstan
Girls' 51 kg	Albina Zhuminova; Kazakhstan	Om Sreypenh; Cambodia	Iyeshia Blair Bituin; Philippines
Girls' 51 kg	Albina Zhuminova; Kazakhstan	Om Sreypenh; Cambodia	Đỗ Phương Nguyên; Vietnam
Girls' 54 kg	Pimlapat Roikaew; Thailand	Zhu Liye; China	Tanishi Bhowmick; Bahrain
Girls' 54 kg	Pimlapat Roikaew; Thailand	Zhu Liye; China	Jasmina Achilova; Uzbekistan
Mai muay	Philippines; Jan Brix Ramiscal; Tyron Jamborillo	United Arab Emirates; Rakan Yousef; Aziz Al-Hammadi	Malaysia; Bethany Lai; Jaethan Quan
Mai muay	Philippines; Jan Brix Ramiscal; Tyron Jamborillo	United Arab Emirates; Rakan Yousef; Aziz Al-Hammadi	Iraq; Yousif Fawzi; Ahmed Fawzi

== Medal table ==
Rank	Nation	Gold	Silver	Bronze	Total
1	Thailand (THA)	4	4	1	9
2	Philippines (PHI)	3	2	1	6
3	Iran (IRI)	2	2	5	9
4	Iraq (IRQ)	2	1	4	7
5	Uzbekistan (UZB)	2	0	3	5
6	United Arab Emirates (UAE)	1	2	0	3
7	Kazakhstan (KAZ)	1	0	4	5
8	Jordan (JOR)	1	0	1	2
9	Palestine (PLE)	1	0	0	1
10	Cambodia (CAM)	0	2	1	3
11	Malaysia (MAS)	0	1	5	6
12	Vietnam (VIE)	0	1	2	3
13	China (CHN)	0	1	1	2
14	Lebanon (LBN)	0	1	0	1
15	Bahrain (BRN)	0	0	1	1
15	India (IND)	0	0	1	1
15	Japan (JPN)	0	0	1	1
15	Kyrgyzstan (KGZ)	0	0	1	1
15	Mongolia (MGL)	0	0	1	1
15	Saudi Arabia (KSA)	0	0	1	1
Totals (20 entries)		17	17	34	68

== Results ==
=== Under-15 ===
==== Boys' wai kru ====
25–26 October

Rank	Athlete	Qual.	Final
1st place, gold medalist(s)	Zeth Gabriel Bueno (PHI)	9.03	9.17
2nd place, silver medalist(s)	Daonuea Phuangmali (THA)	8.97	9.00
3rd place, bronze medalist(s)	Jaethan Quan (MAS)	8.47	8.53
3rd place, bronze medalist(s)	Amir Abbas Saghari (IRI)	8.20	8.40
5	Mustafa Mohammed (IRQ)	8.07	
6	Bành Thế Minh (VIE)	7.80	
7	Sonam Dorji (BHU)	7.43	
8	Mudit Gupta (IND)	7.20	
9	Ibrahim Jamoos (PLE)	7.03	

==== Boys' 45 kg ====
Round of 16; 23 October
Han Zicheng (CHN)	CCL
Xhylord Pete Medina (PHI)
Vuthy Chanthon (CAM)	29
Sayed Alawi Abdulla (BRN)	28
Doston Abduvaliev (UZB)	RSCS
Arlen Amanzholov (KGZ)
Kritsana Hoikaeo (THA)	27
Abolfazl Hajivand (IRI)	30
Bành Thế Minh (VIE)
Zhalgas Ibrakhim (KAZ)	WO
Haikal Faiz (MAS)	RSCH
Zainalaabdin Al-Qallaf (KUW)
Suraj (IND)	DSQ
Rakan Al-Qahtani (KSA)

Quarterfinals; 24 October
Mahdi Qaed (IRQ)	CCL
Han Zicheng (CHN)
Vuthy Chanthon (CAM)	27
Doston Abduvaliev (UZB)	30
Abolfazl Hajivand (IRI)	30
Zhalgas Ibrakhim (KAZ)	27
Haikal Faiz (MAS)	30
Suraj (IND)	27

Semifinals; 25 October
Mahdi Qaed (IRQ)	29
Doston Abduvaliev (UZB)	28
Abolfazl Hajivand (IRI)	RSCH
Haikal Faiz (MAS)

Final; 26 October
Mahdi Qaed (IRQ)	30
Abolfazl Hajivand (IRI)	27

==== Boys' 48 kg ====
Round of 16; 23 October
Genji Rai (NEP)
Trần Quốc Bảo (VIE)	CCL
Ramadhani Abd Razak (MAS)	30
Guo Zhenhao (CHN)	27
Akam Ahmadi (IRI)	WO
Shamlan Al-Shammari (KUW)
Ramis Maslovets (KGZ)	30
Alyhan Aşyrow (TKM)	27
Issa Saidov (KAZ)	27
Suwachat Kongsawat (THA)	30
Karam Al-Marbu (JOR)
Shohjahon Abduvaliev (UZB)	WO

Quarterfinals; 24 October
Abdullah Osamah (IRQ)	30
Porn Sarapich (CAM)	26
Trần Quốc Bảo (VIE)	30
Ramadhani Abd Razak (MAS)	27
Akam Ahmadi (IRI)	27
Ramis Maslovets (KGZ)	30
Suwachat Kongsawat (THA)	30
Shohjahon Abduvaliev (UZB)	27

Semifinals; 25 October
Abdullah Osamah (IRQ)	30
Trần Quốc Bảo (VIE)	27
Ramis Maslovets (KGZ)	27
Suwachat Kongsawat (THA)	30

Final; 26 October
Abdullah Osamah (IRQ)	CCL
Suwachat Kongsawat (THA)

==== Boys' 51 kg ====
Round of 16; 23 October
Nursultan Karbozov (KGZ)	RSCI
Al-Rayyan Ezmeqna (JOR)
Kotaro Nomoto (JPN)	29
Emir Mamedov (KAZ)	28
Yoqub Salimov (TJK)	27
Esmaeil Jafari (IRI)	30
Thorn Chanthou (CAM)	WO
Sirawich Poomithaworn (THA)
Derýaguly Annaorazow (TKM)	RSCS
Othman Al-Neghaimesh (KUW)
Asadbek Turdiboev (UZB)	29
Ibrahim Jamoos (PLE)	28

Quarterfinals; 24 October
Ridha Qayssar (IRQ)	30
Batbekhiin Badam (MGL)	27
Nursultan Karbozov (KGZ)	27
Kotaro Nomoto (JPN)	30
Esmaeil Jafari (IRI)
Thorn Chanthou (CAM)	WO
Derýaguly Annaorazow (TKM)	27
Asadbek Turdiboev (UZB)	30

Semifinals; 25 October
Ridha Qayssar (IRQ)	29
Kotaro Nomoto (JPN)	28
Thorn Chanthou (CAM)	27
Asadbek Turdiboev (UZB)	30

Final; 26 October
Ridha Qayssar (IRQ)	28
Asadbek Turdiboev (UZB)	29

==== Girls' wai kru ====
23–26 October

Rank	Athlete	Qual.	Final
1st place, gold medalist(s)	Lyre Anie Ngina (PHI)	8.90	9.00
2nd place, silver medalist(s)	Auryelle Xzandra Bobby (MAS)	8.67	8.80
3rd place, bronze medalist(s)	Kittima Yotsombat (THA)	8.50	8.60
3rd place, bronze medalist(s)	Sevda Aghaei (IRI)	8.07	8.16
5	Hà Bảo Ngọc (VIE)	7.80	
6	Vivian Allis (PLE)	7.27	
7	Pema Tsokye Dorji (BHU)	7.17	
8	Wan Jiawei (CHN)	7.00	

==== Girls' 40 kg ====
Quarterfinals; 24 October
Hà Bảo Ngọc (VIE)	28
Natthida Kanyaburi (THA)	29
Rabiya Israilova (KGZ)	27
Aisulu Kovaleva (KAZ)	30

Semifinals; 25 October
Baran Jani (IRI)	RSCS
Salina Al-Hayek (JOR)
Natthida Kanyaburi (THA)	30
Aisulu Kovaleva (KAZ)	27

Final; 26 October
Baran Jani (IRI)	29
Natthida Kanyaburi (THA)	28

==== Girls' 45 kg ====
Round of 16; 23 October
Maedeh Sadeghzadeh (IRI)	30
Jeisya Earlene Kalea Ozora (INA)	26
Medina Beishenalieva (KGZ)	30
Kale Casey Tan (PHI)	27
Ly Sreynuch (CAM)	26
Khwanpitcha Chinno (THA)	30
Trần Thị Thu Hà (VIE)	27
Hala Mekdashi (LBN)	30

Quarterfinals; 24 October
Zan Mingjia (CHN)	28
Vivian Allis (PLE)	29
Zaynab Isanova (UZB)	27
Adina Sailau (KAZ)	30
Maedeh Sadeghzadeh (IRI)	29
Medina Beishenalieva (KGZ)	28
Khwanpitcha Chinno (THA)	27
Hala Mekdashi (LBN)	30

Semifinals; 25 October
Vivian Allis (PLE)	29
Adina Sailau (KAZ)	28
Maedeh Sadeghzadeh (IRI)	27
Hala Mekdashi (LBN)	30

Final; 26 October
Vivian Allis (PLE)	30
Hala Mekdashi (LBN)	27

==== Girls' 48 kg ====
Round of 16; 23 October
Nurai Abdymanapova (KGZ)	30
Habiba Muzafari (AFG)	27
Kamila Abdolda (KAZ)	CCL
Mönkhbaataryn Enkh-Uchral (MGL)
Krisha Facsoy (PHI)	CCL
Parish Handique (IND)
Nguyễn Thị Thu Phương (VIE)	30
Wan Jiawei (CHN)	27

Quarterfinals; 24 October
Rojan Behnami (IRI)	CCL
Khwanchanok Anoma (THA)
Mia Nur Al-Amani (MAS)	29
Sai Sophea (CAM)	28
Nurai Abdymanapova (KGZ)
Kamila Abdolda (KAZ)	RSCS
Krisha Facsoy (PHI)
Nguyễn Thị Thu Phương (VIE)	RSCS

Semifinals; 25 October
Rojan Behnami (IRI)	CCL
Mia Nur Al-Amani (MAS)
Kamila Abdolda (KAZ)	27
Nguyễn Thị Thu Phương (VIE)	30

Final; 26 October
Rojan Behnami (IRI)	30
Nguyễn Thị Thu Phương (VIE)	26

=== Under-17 ===
==== Boys' wai kru ====
25–26 October

Rank	Athlete	Qual.	Final
1st place, gold medalist(s)	Pimpichien Chaiwan (THA)	9.03	9.23
2nd place, silver medalist(s)	Jan Brix Ramiscal (PHI)	9.17	9.23
3rd place, bronze medalist(s)	Sajjad Hamzah (IRQ)	8.47	8.47
3rd place, bronze medalist(s)	Taha Sharifi (IRI)	8.13	8.20
5	Bashar Al-Sawalha (UAE)	7.83	
6	Ahmed Al-Lail (KSA)	7.50	
7	Dương Ngọc Thái Bảo (VIE)	7.40	
8	Abdulaziz Maanter (BRN)	7.00	

==== Boys' 54 kg ====
Round of 32 – 23 October
Hashim Al-Haidari (KSA)	27–30	Allanur Abdykarov (KGZ)
Chhong Visal (CAM)	30–27	Suphak Chanthachaem (THA)
Bahaa Khodor (LBN)	CCL	Ali Salem (BRN)

Round of 16; 24 October
Ali Jumah (KUW)
Reza Bakhshi (IRI)	RSCS
Ibrahim Mohammed (IRQ)	29
Saleh Aydi (JOR)	28
Salko Velic (PHI)	26
Muzaffar Nurkhujaev (UZB)	30
Azam Nazarov (TJK)	28
Abulkhairkhan Urazalin (KAZ)	29
Myagmaryn Byambatsogt (MGL)	RSCS
Etayem Etayem (PLE)
Alladurdy Haldurdyýew (TKM)	RSCS
Li Zizong (CHN)
Hoàng Anh Kiệt (VIE)	27
Allanur Abdykarov (KGZ)	30
Chhong Visal (CAM)	29
Bahaa Khodor (LBN)	28

Quarterfinals; 25 October
Reza Bakhshi (IRI)	27
Ibrahim Mohammed (IRQ)	30
Muzaffar Nurkhujaev (UZB)	30
Abulkhairkhan Urazalin (KAZ)	27
Myagmaryn Byambatsogt (MGL)	29
Alladurdy Haldurdyýew (TKM)	28
Allanur Abdykarov (KGZ)	28
Chhong Visal (CAM)	29

Semifinals; 25 October
Ibrahim Mohammed (IRQ)	28
Muzaffar Nurkhujaev (UZB)	29
Myagmaryn Byambatsogt (MGL)	27
Chhong Visal (CAM)	30

Final; 26 October
Muzaffar Nurkhujaev (UZB)	30
Chhong Visal (CAM)	27

==== Boys' 57 kg ====
Round of 16; 23 October
Sodbilegiin Byambajav (MGL)	27
Thitiphong Inkong (THA)	30
Daniel Esengulov (KGZ)	27
Mirjalol Nabiev (UZB)	30
Ward Nairoukh (JOR)	29
Muhammad Safarov (TJK)	28
Dương Ngọc Thái Bảo (VIE)	27
Amir Mohammad Majidinia (IRI)	30
Al-Motasim Bin Salem (KSA)	29
Yaroslav Galich (KAZ)	28
Mohammad Al-Jamea (SYR)	28
Şawelet Serdarow (TKM)	29
Guo Junxiang (CHN)	27
Issam Aymen Khaleel (UAE)	30
Khun Dimey (CAM)	29
Martin James Fernando (PHI)	28

Quarterfinals; 24 October
Thitiphong Inkong (THA)	30
Mirjalol Nabiev (UZB)	26
Ward Nairoukh (JOR)	27
Amir Mohammad Majidinia (IRI)	30
Al-Motasim Bin Salem (KSA)	30
Şawelet Serdarow (TKM)	27
Issam Aymen Khaleel (UAE)	30
Khun Dimey (CAM)	27

Semifinals; 25 October
Thitiphong Inkong (THA)	29
Amir Mohammad Majidinia (IRI)	28
Al-Motasim Bin Salem (KSA)
Issam Aymen Khaleel (UAE)	WO

Final; 26 October
Thitiphong Inkong (THA)	28
Issam Aymen Khaleel (UAE)	29

==== Boys' 60 kg ====
Round of 16; 23 October
Umar Sangov (TJK)	30
Lê Phát Lộc (VIE)	27
Yasin Mousavi (IRI)	30
Rauan Chaikazanov (KAZ)	27
Abbas Ghuloom (BRN)	WO
Jirankumar Meitei Konthoujam (IND)
Selimberdi Çaryýew (TKM)	27
Shakhruz Davronov (UZB)	30
Hem Mangsrun (CAM)	30
Qian Sheng (CHN)	27
Phoosaranwit Siangphro (THA)
Rayan Ahmad (JOR)	CCL

Quarterfinals; 24 October
Mustafa Qutaiba (IRQ)	30
Belal Abdelmeguid (UAE)	27
Umar Sangov (TJK)	27
Yasin Mousavi (IRI)	30
Abbas Ghuloom (BRN)	27
Shakhruz Davronov (UZB)	30
Hem Mangsrun (CAM)	27
Rayan Ahmad (JOR)	30

Semifinals; 25 October
Mustafa Qutaiba (IRQ)	27
Yasin Mousavi (IRI)	30
Shakhruz Davronov (UZB)	27
Rayan Ahmad (JOR)	30

Final; 26 October
Yasin Mousavi (IRI)
Rayan Ahmad (JOR)	RSCS

==== Girls' wai kru ====
23–26 October

Rank	Athlete	Qual.	Final
1st place, gold medalist(s)	Rungthipwa Koakaw (THA)	8.90	9.17
2nd place, silver medalist(s)	Jasmine Dagame (PHI)	8.83	8.93
3rd place, bronze medalist(s)	Ariesya Dania Abdul Latip (MAS)	8.40	8.63
3rd place, bronze medalist(s)	Alphonsa Wriang (IND)	8.27	8.47
5	Kiana Hemmati (IRI)	8.03	
6	Chinzorigiin Yesüi (MGL)	7.73	
7	Đỗ Phương Nguyên (VIE)	7.50	
8	Tasnim Al-Qassab (KSA)	7.40	
9	Aya Chaari (UAE)	7.40	
10	Palistha Kakshapati (NEP)	7.37	

==== Girls' 48 kg ====
Round of 16; 23 October
Vidhi Sharma (IND)	27
Chinzorigiin Yesüi (MGL)	30
Sania Haidari (AFG)
Niracha Tangchio (THA)	RSCS

Quarterfinals; 24 October
Aya Chaari (UAE)	30
Nur Arisya Sofia (MAS)	27
Xie Jiaxin (CHN)	30
Xian Denise Robillos (PHI)	27
Adiya Izbaskan (KAZ)	30
Mohaddeseh Sheibani (IRI)	27
Chinzorigiin Yesüi (MGL)	26
Niracha Tangchio (THA)	30

Semifinals; 25 October
Aya Chaari (UAE)	30
Xie Jiaxin (CHN)	27
Adiya Izbaskan (KAZ)	27
Niracha Tangchio (THA)	30

Final; 26 October
Aya Chaari (UAE)
Niracha Tangchio (THA)	RSCS

==== Girls' 51 kg ====
Quarterfinals; 24 October		Semifinals; 25 October		Final; 26 October
Iyeshia Blair Bituin (PHI)	30
Mahboba Muzafari (AFG)	26	Iyeshia Blair Bituin (PHI)	27
Om Sreypenh (CAM)	30	Om Sreypenh (CAM)	30
Hannaneh Taghipour (IRI)	27			Om Sreypenh (CAM)	27
Nishath Anjum (IND)	26			Albina Zhuminova (KAZ)	30
Đỗ Phương Nguyên (VIE)	30	Đỗ Phương Nguyên (VIE)	28
Plaifon Suwan (THA)	28	Albina Zhuminova (KAZ)	29
Albina Zhuminova (KAZ)	29

==== Girls' 54 kg ====
Round of 16; 23 October
Saly Al-Raee (SYR)	27
Vũ Ngọc Trang (VIE)	30
Jasmina Achilova (UZB)	30
Dorsa Farshadpour (IRI)	27
Albina Nassyrova (KAZ)	30
Mohini Samariya (IND)	26
Zhu Liye (CHN)	RSCS
Veronika Akhmatova (KGZ)

Quarterfinals; 24 October
Tanishi Bhowmick (BRN)	WO
Fatima Al-Ammari (KSA)
Pimlapat Roikaew (THA)	RSCS
Nur Bisyarah Altisya (MAS)
Vũ Ngọc Trang (VIE)	27
Jasmina Achilova (UZB)	30
Albina Nassyrova (KAZ)	27
Zhu Liye (CHN)	30

Semifinals; 25 October
Tanishi Bhowmick (BRN)
Pimlapat Roikaew (THA)	RSCS
Jasmina Achilova (UZB)	27
Zhu Liye (CHN)	30

Final; 26 October
Pimlapat Roikaew (THA)	29
Zhu Liye (CHN)	28

==== Mai muay ====
24–26 October

Rank	Athlete	Qual.	Final
1st place, gold medalist(s)	Philippines (PHI); Jan Brix Ramiscal; Tyron Jamborillo	9.07	9.20
2nd place, silver medalist(s)	United Arab Emirates (UAE); Rakan Yousef; Aziz Al-Hammadi	8.13	8.30
3rd place, bronze medalist(s)	Malaysia (MAS); Bethany Lai; Jaethan Quan	8.00	8.27
3rd place, bronze medalist(s)	Iraq (IRQ); Yousif Fawzi; Ahmed Fawzi	7.93	8.10
5	Vietnam (VIE); Hoàng Anh Kiệt; Bùi Khánh Nguyên	7.67	
6	Iran (IRI); Faraz Banisaeid; Mohammad Rouhi	7.27	
7	India (IND); Yuvraj Singh; Harshita	6.70	
—	Kyrgyzstan (KGZ); Ramis Maslovets; Medina Beishenalieva	DNS	
—	Bhutan (BHU); Sonam Dorji; Pema Tsokye Dorji	DNS	
