= Mixed martial arts at the 2025 Asian Youth Games =

- Venue: Exhibition World Bahrain
- Dates: 23–25 October 2025

Mixed martial arts at the 2025 Asian Youth Games was held in Sakhir, Bahrain from 23 to 25 October 2025 at the Exhibition World Bahrain.

== Medalists ==
=== Modern ===
Event	Gold	Silver	Bronze
Boys' 50 kg	Avaz Anvarov; Uzbekistan	Sanzhar Imangali; Kazakhstan	Umar Sharifov; Tajikistan
Boys' 50 kg	Avaz Anvarov; Uzbekistan	Sanzhar Imangali; Kazakhstan	Alexander Tagure; Philippines
Boys' 55 kg	Faiziddin Khalilov; Tajikistan	Ibrokhimjon Botirov; Uzbekistan	Wesam Al-Ghamdi; Saudi Arabia
Boys' 55 kg	Faiziddin Khalilov; Tajikistan	Ibrokhimjon Botirov; Uzbekistan	Bumi Magani Abraar Himara; Indonesia
Boys' 60 kg	Eldar Eldarov; Bahrain	Mukhammadrasul Kadirdinov; Kyrgyzstan	Ali Asghar Moradi; Iran
Boys' 60 kg	Eldar Eldarov; Bahrain	Mukhammadrasul Kadirdinov; Kyrgyzstan	Mukhammad Saidzoda; Tajikistan
Boys' 65 kg	Abdulhakim Babaev; Bahrain	Haif Al-Qahtani; Saudi Arabia	Kamronbek Kodirov; Uzbekistan
Boys' 65 kg	Abdulhakim Babaev; Bahrain	Haif Al-Qahtani; Saudi Arabia	Amir Serik; Kazakhstan
Boys' 70 kg	Ibragim Khalidov; Bahrain	Al-Baraa Al-Ajam; Saudi Arabia	Daryn Mustafin; Kazakhstan
Boys' 70 kg	Ibragim Khalidov; Bahrain	Al-Baraa Al-Ajam; Saudi Arabia	Abdulboriy Abdugofurov; Uzbekistan
Boys' 75 kg	Abdulelah Meeraleam; Saudi Arabia	Yeraly Ordabayev; Kazakhstan	Suleiman Al-Sheyyab; Jordan
Boys' 75 kg	Abdulelah Meeraleam; Saudi Arabia	Yeraly Ordabayev; Kazakhstan	Abubakr Bakhromov; Tajikistan
Girls' 45 kg	Charlie Ratcliff; Philippines	Nakanantaphon Khaihong; Thailand	Manayra Siagian; Indonesia
Girls' 45 kg	Charlie Ratcliff; Philippines	Nakanantaphon Khaihong; Thailand	Anelya Tsoy; Kazakhstan
Girls' 55 kg	Vania Fathalipour; Iran	Atsuhi Takada; Japan	Gulzhaina Akhtanova; Kazakhstan
Girls' 55 kg	Vania Fathalipour; Iran	Atsuhi Takada; Japan	Mekhrona Kalandarbekova; Tajikistan

=== Traditional ===
Event	Gold	Silver	Bronze
Boys' 60 kg	Amir Mohammad Hatamian; Iran	Travis Ratcliff; Philippines	Osimi Begmurodzoda; Tajikistan
Boys' 60 kg	Amir Mohammad Hatamian; Iran	Travis Ratcliff; Philippines	Satria Eka Suryo Basroni; Indonesia
Boys' 65 kg	Sanzhar Kartay; Kazakhstan	Sultanakhmed Sultanakhmedov; Bahrain	Gibran Alfarizi; Indonesia
Boys' 65 kg	Sanzhar Kartay; Kazakhstan	Sultanakhmed Sultanakhmedov; Bahrain	Hisham Al-Ajam; Saudi Arabia
Boys' 70 kg	Umarjoni Umed; Tajikistan	Ilia Vahedi; Iran	Ahmad Qayomi; Afghanistan
Boys' 70 kg	Umarjoni Umed; Tajikistan	Ilia Vahedi; Iran	Baheti Agelan; China
Boys' 75 kg	Salem Al-Homoud; United Arab Emirates	Fayaz Ahmad Ebrahimi; Afghanistan	Jügderiin Byambasüren; Mongolia
Boys' 75 kg	Salem Al-Homoud; United Arab Emirates	Fayaz Ahmad Ebrahimi; Afghanistan	Kubanych Sharshenbaev; Kyrgyzstan
Boys' 80 kg	Amir Mehdi Vazifeh; Iran	Nurtileu Otegen; Kazakhstan	Veer Bhadu; India
Boys' 80 kg	Amir Mehdi Vazifeh; Iran	Nurtileu Otegen; Kazakhstan	Muso Ibrohimzoda; Tajikistan
Girls' 50 kg	Amelina Bakiyeva; Kazakhstan	Shriya Satam; India	Ghala Al-Hammadi; United Arab Emirates
Girls' 50 kg	Amelina Bakiyeva; Kazakhstan	Shriya Satam; India	Kamand Karamzad; Iran
Girls' 60 kg	Tiam Dehpahlavan; Iran	Bat-Erdeniin Ölziitnaran; Mongolia	Marhabo Boboeva; Tajikistan
Girls' 60 kg	Tiam Dehpahlavan; Iran	Bat-Erdeniin Ölziitnaran; Mongolia	Gulmairam Abdykerimova; Kyrgyzstan

== Medal table ==
Rank	Nation	Gold	Silver	Bronze	Total
1	Iran (IRI)	4	1	2	7
2	Bahrain (BRN)	3	1	0	4
3	Kazakhstan (KAZ)	2	3	4	9
4	Tajikistan (TJK)	2	0	7	9
5	Saudi Arabia (KSA)	1	2	2	5
6	Uzbekistan (UZB)	1	1	2	4
7	Philippines (PHI)	1	1	1	3
8	United Arab Emirates (UAE)	1	0	1	2
9	Kyrgyzstan (KGZ)	0	1	2	3
10	Afghanistan (AFG)	0	1	1	2
10	India (IND)	0	1	1	2
10	Mongolia (MGL)	0	1	1	2
13	Japan (JPN)	0	1	0	1
13	Thailand (THA)	0	1	0	1
15	Indonesia (INA)	0	0	4	4
16	China (CHN)	0	0	1	1
16	Jordan (JOR)	0	0	1	1
Totals (17 entries)		15	15	30	60

== Results ==
=== Modern ===
==== Boys' 50 kg ====
Round of 16; 23 October
Sok Devit (CAM)
Umar Sharifov (TJK)	DSQ
Abdulla Al-Darmaki (UAE)
Sanzhar Imangali (KAZ)	DSQ
Avaz Anvarov (UZB)	SUB
Mohammad Al-Hamdan (JOR)
Teerakorn Srimoon (THA)
Abdulrahman Al-Sayed (KSA)	UD

Quarterfinals; 23 October
Umar Sharifov (TJK)	SUB
Saood Salman (BRN)
Erzhan Kamaldinov (KGZ)
Sanzhar Imangali (KAZ)	DSQ
Fachriza Satria Sampora (INA)
Avaz Anvarov (UZB)	UD
Alexander Tagure (PHI)	SD
Abdulrahman Al-Sayed (KSA)

Semifinals; 24 October
Umar Sharifov (TJK)
Sanzhar Imangali (KAZ)	DSQ
Avaz Anvarov (UZB)	SUB
Alexander Tagure (PHI)

Final; 25 October
Sanzhar Imangali (KAZ)
Avaz Anvarov (UZB)	MD

==== Boys' 55 kg ====
Round of 16; 23 October
Muhammad Saqib (PAK)
Ibrokhimjon Botirov (UZB)	DSQ
Firdaus Ergashov (KGZ)	UD
Hossein Ghorbani (IRI)
Ryenchindorjiin Baasanjargal (MGL)
Jan Michael Tabunot (PHI)	SD
Bumi Magani Abraar Himara (INA)	SUB
Ry Keosomnang (CAM)
Faiziddin Khalilov (TJK)	SUB
Aseel Al-Mutawa (BRN)

Quarterfinals; 23 October
Ibrokhimjon Botirov (UZB)	UD
Firdaus Ergashov (KGZ)
Wesam Al-Ghamdi (KSA)	SUB
Jan Michael Tabunot (PHI)
Zhaiyk Tulegenov (KAZ)
Bumi Magani Abraar Himara (INA)	SUB
Faiziddin Khalilov (TJK)	SUB
Thawin Wangnuruk (THA)

Semifinals; 24 October
Ibrokhimjon Botirov (UZB)	UD
Wesam Al-Ghamdi (KSA)
Bumi Magani Abraar Himara (INA)
Faiziddin Khalilov (TJK)	UD

Final; 25 October
Ibrokhimjon Botirov (UZB)
Faiziddin Khalilov (TJK)	MD

==== Boys' 60 kg ====
Round of 16; 23 October
Ali Asghar Moradi (IRI)	DSQ
Mohammad Tayih (JOR)
Amin Ullah (PAK)
Behruz Rustamov (UZB)	DSQ
Altair Meirkhanov (KAZ)	UD
Ahmad Abdulrahim (UAE)

Quarterfinals; 23 October
Ali Asghar Moradi (IRI)	MD
Anas Al-Zahrani (KSA)
Eldar Eldarov (BRN)	UD
Behruz Rustamov (UZB)
Mukhammad Saidzoda (TJK)	MD
Altair Meirkhanov (KAZ)
Mukhammadrasul Kadirdinov (KGZ)	MD
Rangga Dika Mahendra (INA)

Semifinals; 24 October
Ali Asghar Moradi (IRI)
Eldar Eldarov (BRN)	DSQ
Mukhammad Saidzoda (TJK)
Mukhammadrasul Kadirdinov (KGZ)	DSQ

Final; 25 October
Eldar Eldarov (BRN)	SUB
Mukhammadrasul Kadirdinov (KGZ)

==== Boys' 65 kg ====
Round of 16; 23 October
Thitiwut Ratchakhwan (THA)
Kamronbek Kodirov (UZB)	SUB
Abdulhakim Babaev (BRN)	UD
Amir Ali Aliabadi (IRI)
Saidibrohim Muminov (TJK)	UD
Abdurakhman Korgonbaev (KGZ)

Quarterfinals; 23 October
Kamronbek Kodirov (UZB)	SUB
Ishan Vyas (IND)
Haif Al-Qahtani (KSA)	UD
Omar Abuneim (PLE)
Abdulhakim Babaev (BRN)	MD
Omar Al-Marzooqi (UAE)
Amir Serik (KAZ)	UD
Saidibrohim Muminov (TJK)

Semifinals; 24 October
Kamronbek Kodirov (UZB)
Haif Al-Qahtani (KSA)	SD
Abdulhakim Babaev (BRN)	DSQ
Amir Serik (KAZ)

Final; 25 October
Haif Al-Qahtani (KSA)
Abdulhakim Babaev (BRN)	SUB

==== Boys' 70 kg ====
Quarterfinals; 23 October
Daryn Mustafin (KAZ)	UD
Abolfazl Fotouhi (IRI)
Laith Al-Gharaibeh (JOR)
Ibragim Khalidov (BRN)	UD
Al-Baraa Al-Ajam (KSA)	UD
Mandakhyn Önömönkh (MGL)
Haitham Ismail (PLE)
Abdulboriy Abdugofurov (UZB)	SUB

Semifinals; 24 October
Daryn Mustafin (KAZ)
Ibragim Khalidov (BRN)	SUB
Al-Baraa Al-Ajam (KSA)	SUB
Abdulboriy Abdugofurov (UZB)

Final; 25 October
Ibragim Khalidov (BRN)	SUB
Al-Baraa Al-Ajam (KSA)

==== Boys' 75 kg ====
Quarterfinals; 23 October
Enkhtüvshingiin Telmen (MGL)
Abdulelah Meeraleam (KSA)	SUB
Mohammed Damees Almeer (IND)
Abubakr Bakhromov (TJK)	UD
Mukhammadali Otajonov (UZB)
Yeraly Ordabayev (KAZ)	SUB

Semifinals; 24 October
Suleiman Al-Sheyyab (JOR)
Abdulelah Meeraleam (KSA)	TKO
Abubakr Bakhromov (TJK)
Yeraly Ordabayev (KAZ)	MD

Final; 25 October
Abdulelah Meeraleam (KSA)	UD
Yeraly Ordabayev (KAZ)

==== Girls' 45 kg ====
Quarterfinals; 23 October
Zhang Yang (CHN)
Nakanantaphon Khaihong (THA)	MD
Manayra Siagian (INA)	MD
Aylin Abbasnejad (IRI)
Afra Al-Mutwa (UAE)
Anelya Tsoy (KAZ)	DSQ
Charlie Ratcliff (PHI)	DSQ
Khorn Vichetchantra (CAM)

Semifinals; 24 October
Nakanantaphon Khaihong (THA)	DSQ
Manayra Siagian (INA)
Anelya Tsoy (KAZ)
Charlie Ratcliff (PHI)	UD

Final; 25 October
Nakanantaphon Khaihong (THA)
Charlie Ratcliff (PHI)	SUB

==== Girls' 55 kg ====
Quarterfinals; 23 October
Delgerbayaryn Ariungoo (MGL)
Gulzhaina Akhtanova (KAZ)	DSQ
Atsuhi Takada (JPN)	SUB
Tep Sreynich (CAM)
Mekhrona Kalandarbekova (TJK)	SUB
Su Wenfei (CHN)

Semifinals; 24 October
Gulzhaina Akhtanova (KAZ)
Atsuhi Takada (JPN)	MD
Vania Fathalipour (IRI)	UD
Mekhrona Kalandarbekova (TJK)

Final; 25 October
Atsuhi Takada (JPN)
Vania Fathalipour (IRI)	SD

=== Traditional ===
==== Boys' 60 kg ====
Round of 16; 23 October
Travis Ratcliff (PHI)	DSQ
Deng Hanwen (CHN)

Quarterfinals; 23 October
Travis Ratcliff (PHI)	UD
Nodirbek Abdurashidov (UZB)
Osimi Begmurodzoda (TJK)	UD
Omar Al-Raeesi (UAE)
Amir Mohammad Hatamian (IRI)	UD
Akdil Zaiyrbekov (KGZ)
Abdulla Qahtan (BRN)
Satria Eka Suryo Basroni (INA)	DSQ

Semifinals; 24 October
Travis Ratcliff (PHI)	DSQ
Osimi Begmurodzoda (TJK)
Amir Mohammad Hatamian (IRI)	UD
Satria Eka Suryo Basroni (INA)

Final; 25 October
Travis Ratcliff (PHI)
Amir Mohammad Hatamian (IRI)	UD

==== Boys' 65 kg ====
Quarterfinals; 23 October
Gibran Alfarizi (INA)	UD
Mahyar Shafaei (IRI)
Sultanakhmed Sultanakhmedov (BRN)	UD
Lucho Aguilar (PHI)
Hisham Al-Ajam (KSA)	SUB
Dastan Kurmankulov (KGZ)
Saif Al-Jneibi (UAE)
Sanzhar Kartay (KAZ)	SUB

Semifinals; 24 October
Gibran Alfarizi (INA)
Sultanakhmed Sultanakhmedov (BRN)	UD
Hisham Al-Ajam (KSA)
Sanzhar Kartay (KAZ)	UD

Final; 25 October
Sultanakhmed Sultanakhmedov (BRN)
Sanzhar Kartay (KAZ)	MD

==== Boys' 70 kg ====
Quarterfinals; 23 October
Ilia Vahedi (IRI)	SD
Bassam Fallatah (KSA)
Ahmad Qayomi (AFG)	MD
Yash Sameer Muthal (IND)
Mukhammadamin Khudaiberdiev (KGZ)
Baheti Agelan (CHN)	MD
Erdenechuluuny Tüvshinbayar (MGL)
Umarjoni Umed (TJK)	UD

Semifinals; 24 October
Ilia Vahedi (IRI)	DSQ
Ahmad Qayomi (AFG)
Baheti Agelan (CHN)
Umarjoni Umed (TJK)	UD

Final; 25 October
Ilia Vahedi (IRI)
Umarjoni Umed (TJK)	MD

==== Boys' 75 kg ====
===== Groups =====
23–24 October

Group A
Pos	Athlete	Pld	W	L	Pts	UAE	MGL	THA
1	Salem Al-Homoud (UAE)	2	2	0	7	—	UD	DSQ
2	Jügderiin Byambasüren (MGL)	2	1	1	4	0–3	—	DSQ
3	Watcharakon Nagittasung (THA)	2	0	2	0	0–4	0–4	—

Group B
Pos	Athlete	Pld	W	L	Pts	AFG	KGZ	IND
1	Fayaz Ahmad Ebrahimi (AFG)	2	2	0	6	—	UD	UD
2	Kubanych Sharshenbaev (KGZ)	2	1	1	5	0–3	—	SUB
3	Shaurya Gandhi (IND)	2	0	2	1	1–3	0–5	—

Source: Official website

===== Final =====
25 October

Final
Salem Al-Homoud (UAE)	TD–W
Fayaz Ahmad Ebrahimi (AFG)

==== Boys' 80 kg ====
===== Groups =====
23–24 October

Group A
Pos	Athlete	Pld	W	L	Pts	IRI	IND	THA
1	Amir Mehdi Vazifeh (IRI)	2	2	0	10	—	SUB	SUB
2	Veer Bhadu (IND)	2	1	1	3	0–5	—	UD
3	Dechachot Barisri (THA)	2	0	2	0	0–5	0–3	—

Group B
Pos	Athlete	Pld	W	L	Pts	KAZ	TJK	UZB
1	Nurtileu Otegen (KAZ)	2	2	0	6	—	UD	UD
2	Muso Ibrohimzoda (TJK)	2	1	1	5	0–3	—	SUB
3	Abdisalam Genjebaev (UZB)	2	0	2	0	0–3	0–5	—

Source: Official website

===== Final =====
25 October

Final
Amir Mehdi Vazifeh (IRI)	SUB
Nurtileu Otegen (KAZ)

==== Girls' 50 kg ====
===== Groups =====
23–24 October

Group A
Pos	Athlete	Pld	W	L	Pts	IND	UAE	KGZ
1	Shriya Satam (IND)	2	2	0	6	—	MD	UD
2	Ghala Al-Hammadi (UAE)	2	1	1	5	0–3	—	SUB
3	Mariiam Akzholova (KGZ)	2	0	2	0	0–3	0–5	—

Group B
Pos	Athlete	Pld	W	L	Pts	KAZ	IRI	TJK
1	Amelina Bakiyeva (KAZ)	2	2	0	8	—	UD	SUB
2	Kamand Karamzad (IRI)	2	1	1	3	0–3	—	MD
3	Fotima Fozilova (TJK)	2	0	2	0	0–5	0–3	—

Source: Official website

===== Final =====
25 October

Final
Shriya Satam (IND)
Amelina Bakiyeva (KAZ)	SUB

==== Girls' 60 kg ====
===== Groups =====
23–24 October

Group A
Pos	Athlete	Pld	W	L	Pts	IRI	TJK	THA
1	Tiam Dehpahlavan (IRI)	2	2	0	6	—	SD	UD
2	Marhabo Boboeva (TJK)	2	1	1	6	1–3	—	SUB
3	Chayaporn Khanttisurin (THA)	2	0	2	0	0–3	0–5	—

Group B
Pos	Athlete	Pld	W	L	Pts	MGL	KGZ	KAZ
1	Bat-Erdeniin Ölziitnaran (MGL)	2	2	0	8	—	MD	SUB
2	Gulmairam Abdykerimova (KGZ)	2	1	1	3	0–3	—	UD
3	Khadizha Telmankyzy (KAZ)	2	0	2	1	0–5	1–3	—

Source: Official website

===== Final =====
25 October

Final
Tiam Dehpahlavan (IRI)	UD
Bat-Erdeniin Ölziitnaran (MGL)
