= Kabaddi at the 2025 Asian Youth Games =

2025 Asian Youth Games competition

- Venue: Isa Sports City
- Dates: 19–23 October 2025

Kabaddi at the 2025 Asian Youth Games was held in Riffa, Bahrain from 19 to 23 October 2025 at the Isa Sports City.

== Medalists ==
Event	Gold	Silver	Bronze
Boys	India; Rahul Singh Bohra; Akhil; Akash; Prasad Dattatray Dighole; Ishant; Aditya; Aryan; Shubham; Sachin Chaudhary; Keshav; Harsh; Abinesh Mohandass; Harish Gadde; Anuj Kamal Chaudhary	Iran; Mahdiar Avarseji; Ali Asadpour; Bardia Babapour; Mehdi Ghahremani; Mohammad Hadi Hassannejad; Hossein Nasseri; Saleh Malekzadeh; Mohsen Hamoudi; Amir Ali Khalili; Alireza Rezaeimehr; Amir Arsalan Shahraki; Saleh Shahkouhmahalli; Taha Eslami; Amir Ali Pournikghalb	Bangladesh; Julfiker Akash; Rakibul Hasan Shayed; Leon; Masrur Arafath Adnan; Sahed Rahaman Nafi; Lipon Mazumder Billion; Rana Sarder; Md Raju; Tajul Islam Rafen; Md Mustakin; Sadiun Kawsar; Abu Hanifa; Umor Faruk Jibon; Abdullah Al Arefin
Boys	India; Rahul Singh Bohra; Akhil; Akash; Prasad Dattatray Dighole; Ishant; Aditya; Aryan; Shubham; Sachin Chaudhary; Keshav; Harsh; Abinesh Mohandass; Harish Gadde; Anuj Kamal Chaudhary	Iran; Mahdiar Avarseji; Ali Asadpour; Bardia Babapour; Mehdi Ghahremani; Mohammad Hadi Hassannejad; Hossein Nasseri; Saleh Malekzadeh; Mohsen Hamoudi; Amir Ali Khalili; Alireza Rezaeimehr; Amir Arsalan Shahraki; Saleh Shahkouhmahalli; Taha Eslami; Amir Ali Pournikghalb	Pakistan; Gull Sher Ali; Ali Hassan; Muhammad Muqeeb; Muhammad Ali; Adeel Ahmad; Usman Ali; Hamad Ahmad; Shah Zaib; Syed Hamza Shah; Muhammad Awais; Muhammad Abdullah; Muhammad Imran; Hisham Fazl Akbar
Girls	India; Nikita Devanda; Akshita Devanda; Priyanka Padhan; Arpita; Lakshita Gurjar; Karthika Ramesh; Krishna; Bhumika; Preeti Thakur; Nikita Kumari; Diksha; Komal; Serena Mhaskar; Khushi	Iran; Aysan Ghasemi; Hasti Keshavarzi; Mahsa Borounli; Zahra Shahsavan; Mobina Madadi; Elistar Shokri; Fatemeh Abbaszadeh; Mohanna Khalili; Shadi Ashrafi; Fereshteh Kolagar; Kiana Fazeli; Respina Mohebbi; Faezeh Moradi; Paria Hoshyar	Thailand; Sumari Phasida; Saranporn Sangwandee; Thanison Raksithong; Sirada Chanchaemsri; Phanida Kaewluang; Tanitta Aiadsi; Hiranyaphon Aimbun; Hiranyika Aimbun; Chayanit Satit; Pawarisa Eaddam; Wachiraya Nuisiri; Saengdao Ramsin; Irada Chaiwong; Phanida Autthapong
Girls	India; Nikita Devanda; Akshita Devanda; Priyanka Padhan; Arpita; Lakshita Gurjar; Karthika Ramesh; Krishna; Bhumika; Preeti Thakur; Nikita Kumari; Diksha; Komal; Serena Mhaskar; Khushi	Iran; Aysan Ghasemi; Hasti Keshavarzi; Mahsa Borounli; Zahra Shahsavan; Mobina Madadi; Elistar Shokri; Fatemeh Abbaszadeh; Mohanna Khalili; Shadi Ashrafi; Fereshteh Kolagar; Kiana Fazeli; Respina Mohebbi; Faezeh Moradi; Paria Hoshyar	Bangladesh; Anzuara Ratry; Tahrim; Laboni Yeasmin Roza; Nidhi Singha; Moyna Akter Setu; Antora Rani Ray; Rabaya Khanom; Ruma Chakma; Avi Chakma; Mst Sadia; Oishi Akter; Tahmina Akter; Rifa Akter; Kotha Rani Shil

== Medal table ==
Rank	Nation	Gold	Silver	Bronze	Total
1	India (IND)	2	0	0	2
2	Iran (IRI)	0	2	0	2
3	Bangladesh (BAN)	0	0	2	2
4	Pakistan (PAK)	0	0	1	1
4	Thailand (THA)	0	0	1	1
Totals (5 entries)		2	2	4	8

== Results ==
=== Boys ===
==== Preliminary round ====
Pos	Team	Pld	W	D	L	PF	PA	PD	Pts
1	India	6	6	0	0	468	160	+308	12
2	Iran	6	4	0	2	407	191	+216	8
3	Bangladesh	6	4	0	2	331	266	+65	8
4	Pakistan	6	3	0	3	280	325	−45	6
5	Thailand	6	2	0	4	304	334	−30	4
6	Sri Lanka	6	2	0	4	230	359	−129	4
7	Bahrain	6	0	0	6	139	524	−385	0

Source: Official website

19 October
10:00

Bahrain	21–87 (HT: 7–50)	Pakistan

Isa Sports City, Riffa

19 October
11:00

Thailand	29–72 (HT: 15–31)	Iran

Isa Sports City, Riffa

19 October
12:05

Bangladesh	19–83 (HT: 7–46)	India

Isa Sports City, Riffa

19 October
17:00

Sri Lanka	65–21 (HT: 34–5)	Bahrain

Isa Sports City, Riffa

19 October
18:00

Pakistan	62–57 (HT: 39–26)	Thailand

Isa Sports City, Riffa

19 October
19:00

Iran	48–55 (HT: 21–22)	Bangladesh

Isa Sports City, Riffa

20 October
10:00

India	89–16 (HT: 39–8)	Sri Lanka

Isa Sports City, Riffa

20 October
11:00

Bahrain	23–90 (HT: 10–39)	Thailand

Isa Sports City, Riffa

20 October
12:05

Pakistan	21–74 (HT: 7–36)	Iran

Isa Sports City, Riffa

20 October
17:00

Bangladesh	53–40 (HT: 31–21)	Sri Lanka

Isa Sports City, Riffa

20 October
18:00

Pakistan	26–81 (HT: 12–38)	India

Isa Sports City, Riffa

21 October
10:00

Thailand	49–50 (HT: 21–31)	Sri Lanka

Isa Sports City, Riffa

21 October
11:00

Iran	92–17 (HT: 43–5)	Bahrain

Isa Sports City, Riffa

21 October
17:00

Sri Lanka	36–55 (HT: 16–32)	Pakistan

Isa Sports City, Riffa

21 October
18:00

Thailand	49–42 (HT: 23–25)	Bangladesh

Isa Sports City, Riffa

21 October
19:00

Iran	29–46 (HT: 16–27)	India

Isa Sports City, Riffa

22 October
10:00

Bangladesh	56–29 (HT: 27–14)	Pakistan

Isa Sports City, Riffa

22 October
11:00

India	84–40 (HT: 39–21)	Bahrain

Isa Sports City, Riffa

22 October
12:05

Sri Lanka	23–92 (HT: 6–50)	Iran

Isa Sports City, Riffa

23 October
10:00

Bahrain	17–106 (HT: 9–57)	Bangladesh

Isa Sports City, Riffa

23 October
11:00

India	85–30 (HT: 35–21)	Thailand

Isa Sports City, Riffa

==== Gold medal match ====
23 October
17:00

India	35–32 (HT: 21–16)	Iran

Isa Sports City, Riffa

=== Girls ===
==== Preliminary round ====
Pos	Team	Pld	W	D	L	PF	PA	PD	Pts
1	India	4	4	0	0	248	77	+171	8
2	Iran	4	3	0	1	174	139	+35	6
3	Thailand	4	2	0	2	142	187	−45	4
4	Bangladesh	4	1	0	3	114	157	−43	2
5	Sri Lanka	4	0	0	4	102	220	−118	0

Source: Official website

19 October
10:15

Sri Lanka	26–46 (HT: 14–20)	Thailand

Isa Sports City, Riffa

19 October
11:15

India	46–18 (HT: 21–9)	Bangladesh

Isa Sports City, Riffa

19 October
17:15

Iran	54–26 (HT: 23–11)	Sri Lanka

Isa Sports City, Riffa

19 October
18:15

Thailand	23–70 (HT: 8–38)	India

Isa Sports City, Riffa

20 October
10:15

Bangladesh	19–33 (HT: 10–21)	Iran

Isa Sports City, Riffa

20 October
11:15

Sri Lanka	10–73 (HT: 3–50)	India

Isa Sports City, Riffa

20 October
17:15

Bangladesh	30–38 (HT: 14–19)	Thailand

Isa Sports City, Riffa

20 October
18:15

India	59–26 (HT: 34–13)	Iran

Isa Sports City, Riffa

21 October
10:15

Sri Lanka	40–47 (HT: 18–25)	Bangladesh

Isa Sports City, Riffa

21 October
11:15

Thailand	35–61 (HT: 18–30)	Iran

Isa Sports City, Riffa

==== Gold medal match ====
23 October
16:00

India	75–21 (HT: 33–12)	Iran

Isa Sports City, Riffa
