= Malaysia at the 2025 Asian Youth Games =

- IOC code: MAS
- NOC: Olympic Council of Malaysia
- Website: www.olympic.org.my (in English)

in Manama, Bahrain 22 October 2025 – 31 October 2025
- Competitors: 94 in 13 sports
- Medals Ranked 23rd: Gold 1 Silver 2 Bronze 9 Total 12

Asian Youth Games appearances
- 2009; 2013; 2025

Malaysia is competing at the 2025 Asian Youth Games in Manama, Bahrain, from 22 to 31 October 2025. This is Malaysia's third appearance in the competition since the 2009 edition.

The Malaysian contingent consists of 94 athletes across 13 sports disciplines.

== Medalists ==
Medal	Name	Sport	Event	Date
Gold	Puteri Sharifah Ariel Budriah	Equestrian	Jumping individual	26 October
Silver	Auryelle Xzandra	Muaythai	Girls' Wai Kru 14-15	26 October
Silver	Gerfan Nigel	Athletics	Boys' pole vault	26 October
Bronze	Muhammad Raqib Darwisy	Pencak silat	Boys' 59–63 kg	20 October
Bronze	Rahmat Abdullah; Danish Amirul	Teqball	Boys' doubles	23 October
Bronze	Danish Amirul; Putri Mohamad	Teqball	Mixed doubles	23 October
Bronze	Tiffany Sia May Sim	Taekwondo	Girls' freestyle poomsae	23 October
Bronze	Muhammad Haikal Faiz	Muaythai	Boys' 45 kg combat discipline	25 October
Bronze	Mia Nashary	Muaythai	Girls' 48 kg combat discipline	25 October
Bronze	Jaethan Jonathan Quan	Muaythai	Boys' Wai Kru 14-15	26 October
Bronze	Ariesya Dania Abdul Latip	Muaythai	Girls' Wai Kru 16-17	26 October
Bronze	Jaethan Jonathan Quan; Bethany Yun	Muaythai	Mixed team	26 October

== Equestrian ==
=== Endurance ===
Athlete	Event	Final	
Athlete	Event	Time	Rank
Nurhan Nurhairi	Individual endurance	8:05:05	14
Abdullah Faqeh	Individual endurance	FTQ	
Faris Faisal	Individual endurance	FTQ	
Irdina Kamaluddin	Individual endurance	FTQ	
Elisya Farid	Individual endurance	FTQ	
Nurhan Nurhairi; Abdullah Faqeh; Faris Faisal; Irdina Kamaluddin; Elisya Farid	Team endurance	FTQ	

=== Show jumping ===
Individual

Athlete	Event	Final		Jump-off		Rank
Athlete	Event	Penalties	Time	Penalties	Time	Rank
Sharifah Ariel Budriah	Jumping	0	62.69	0	29.85	1st place, gold medalist(s)
Elly Poh	Jumping	EL		Did not advance		
Arissa Edzwan	Jumping	EL		Did not advance		
Sonia Aisyah	Jumping	EL		Did not advance		

Team

Athlete	Event	Penalties			Jump-off		Rank
Athlete	Event	Round 1	Round 2	Total	Penalties	Time	Rank
Sharifah Ariel Budriah; Elly Poh; Arissa Edzwan; Sonia Aisyah	Jumping	4	EL	EL	Did not advance		

== Muaythai ==
Athlete	Event	Qualification		Final	
Athlete	Event	Score	Rank	Score	Rank
Jaethan Quan	Boy's wai kru 14–15	8.47	3 Q	8.53	3rd place, bronze medalist(s)
Auryelle Bobby	Girls' wai kru 14–15	8.67	2 Q	8.80	2nd place, silver medalist(s)
Ariesya Abdul Latip	Girls' wai kru 16–17	8.40	3 Q	8.63	3rd place, bronze medalist(s)
Jaethan Quan; Bethany Lai	Mixed team mai muay	8.00	3 Q	8.27	3rd place, bronze medalist(s)

=== Combat discipline ===
Boys'

Athlete	Event	Round of 16	Quarterfinals	Semifinals	Final	Rank
Athlete	Event	Opposition Result	Opposition Result	Opposition Result	Opposition Result	Rank
Haikal Faiz	45 kg 14–15	Al-Qallaf (KUW); W RSCS–0	Suraj (IND); W 30–27	Hajivand (IRI); L 9–RSCS	Did not advance	3rd place, bronze medalist(s)
Ramadhani Abd Razak	48 kg 14–15	Guo Z (CHN); W 30–27	Tran (VIE); L 27–30	Did not advance		

Girls'

Athlete	Event	Round of 16	Quarterfinals	Semifinals	Final	Rank
Athlete	Event	Opposition Result	Opposition Result	Opposition Result	Opposition Result	Rank
Mia Al-Amani Nashary	48 kg 14–15	Bye	Sophea Sai (CAM); W 29–28	Behnami (IRI); L 0–CCL	Did not advance	3rd place, bronze medalist(s)
Arisya Sofia Abdullah	48 kg 16–17	Bye	Chaari (UAE); W 27–30	Did not advance		
Nur Bisyarah Zairee	54 kg 16–17	Bye	Pimlapat (THA); L 18–RSCS	Did not advance		

== Pencak silat ==
Athlete	Event	Quarterfinals	Semifinals	Final	Rank
Athlete	Event	Opposition Result	Opposition Result	Opposition Result	Rank
Raqib Darwisy	Boys' 59–63 kg	Eluna (PHI); W 40–13	Ruziboev (UZB); L DSQ	Did not advance	3rd place, bronze medalist(s)
Wafadina Mohd Rasidi	Girls' 51–55 kg	Bozorova (UZB); L DSQ	Did not advance		

== Teqball ==
Athlete	Event	Group stage				Rank	Quarterfinals	Semifinals	Final / BM	Rank
Athlete	Event	Opposition Result	Opposition Result	Opposition Result	Opposition Result	Rank	Opposition Result	Opposition Result	Opposition Result	Rank
Rahmat Abdullah	Boys' singles	Mao (CHN); L 1–2	Sakpal (IND); W 2–1	—N/a		2 Q	Siddiqui (PAK); W 2–0	Khammas (IRQ); L 0–2	Alsaqer (KUW); L 0–2	4
Putri Mohamad	Girls' singles	Syifa (INA); L 1–2	Jiang (CHN); L 0–2	Jaikum (THA); L 0–2	Al Dulaimi (IRQ); L 0–2	5	Did not advance			
Rahmat Abdullah; Danish Amirul	Boys' doubles	Alwuhaib/ Alkandari (KUW); W 2–1	Nabil/ Nugraha (INA); W 2–0	Chebbo/ El Sabbagh (LBN); W 2–0	Zhang/ Li (CHN); W 2–1	1 Q	Singha/ Li (IND); W 2–1	Al Elayawi/ Khammas (IRQ); L 0–2	Zhang/ Li (CHN); W 2–0	3rd place, bronze medalist(s)
Danish Amirul; Putri Mohamad	Mixed doubles	Sharif/ Fatima (BRN); W 2–0	Andres/ Tabucol (PHI); W 2–0	Al Elayawi/ Al Dulaimi (IRQ); L 0–2	—N/a	2 Q	Khachffe/ El Sabbagh (LBN); W 2–0	Al Elayawi/ Al Dulaimi (IRQ); L 0–2	Wu/ Luan (CHN); W 2–0	3rd place, bronze medalist(s)

== Taekwondo ==
Boys

Athlete	Event	Round of 32	Round of 16	Quarterfinals	Semifinals	Final	
Athlete	Event	Opposition Score	Opposition Score	Opposition Score	Opposition Score	Opposition Score	Rank
Phongsakorn Som Phong	–48 kg	Sattorov (UZB); L 0–2	Did not advance				
Aidil Hakim Azman	–55 kg	Lavestre (PHI); L 0–2	Did not advance				
Yap Ren Ken	+73 kg	—N/a	Yegor (KAZ); L 1–2	Did not advance			
Harry Daniel Hunter	Freestyle poomsae	—N/a				6.780	6
Anuwath Sarat	Recognised poomsae	—N/a		Pongsakorn (THA); L 8.300–8.410	Did not advance		

Girls

Athlete	Event	Round of 32	Round of 16	Quarterfinals	Semifinals	Final	
Athlete	Event	Opposition Score	Opposition Score	Opposition Score	Opposition Score	Opposition Score	Rank
Izzah Zatul Ikram	–44 kg	Bahar (IRI); L 0–2	Did not advance				
Hafidzha Rizal	–55 kg	Shaika (UAE); L 1–2	Did not advance				
Vissha Vissha	+63 kg	—N/a	Leen (KSA); W 2–0	Zhang (CHN); L 0–2	Did not advance		
Tiffany Sia May Sim	Freestyle poomsae	—N/a				6.74	3rd place, bronze medalist(s)

== Triathlon ==
Athlete	Event	Final	
Athlete	Event	Result	Rank
Ng Han Yang	Boys' individual	30:12	16
Wong Jun You	Boys' individual	31:08	23
