= Equestrian at the 2025 Asian Youth Games =

- Venue: Bahrain Military Sport Association; Bahrain Equestrian Endurance Village
- Dates: 23–30 October 2025

Equestrian events at the 2025 Asian Youth Games were held in Bahrain in October 2025. Jumping events were contested from 23 to 26 October at the Military Sport Association and Endurance events were held on 30 October at the Equestrian Endurance Village

== Medalists ==
Event	Gold	Silver	Bronze
Individual endurance	Essa Al-Mazrouei; United Arab Emirates	Ahmad Al-Bastaki; United Arab Emirates	Khalifa Rashed Al-Ameemi; United Arab Emirates
Team endurance	United Arab Emirates; Khalifa Rashed Al-Ameemi; Ahmad Al-Bastaki; Ali Abdulla Al-Falasi; Essa Al-Mazrouei; Rashed Al-Mheiri	Bahrain; Bader Al-Anezi; Faisal Al-Anezi; Abdulrahman Al-Khatri; Sultan Al-Romaihi; Nayef Sabt	Saudi Arabia; Abdullah Al-Misned; Abdulaziz Al-Mobark; Nora Al-Obaidli; Salman Al-Qurashi; Qusai Sami
Individual jumping	Ariel Budriah Jamalullail; Malaysia	Humam Harith; Iraq	Saleh Al-Karbi; United Arab Emirates
Team jumping	Jordan; Mohammad Abu Hamour; Ghazi Al-Aboura; Eman Daghistani; Taimur Ulserim	Qatar; Mohammed Eisa Al-Bukhari; Abdulaziz Al-Fakhroo; Amer Al-Mansoori; Suhaim Al-Yafei	Saudi Arabia; Abdulhadi Al-Kahtani; Abdulmajeed Al-Khammash; Mashhoor Al-Othaim; Abdulaziz Gohal

== Medal table ==
Rank	Nation	Gold	Silver	Bronze	Total
1	United Arab Emirates (UAE)	2	1	2	5
2	Jordan (JOR)	1	0	0	1
2	Malaysia (MAS)	1	0	0	1
4	Bahrain (BRN)	0	1	0	1
4	Iraq (IRQ)	0	1	0	1
4	Qatar (QAT)	0	1	0	1
7	Saudi Arabia (KSA)	0	0	2	2
Totals (7 entries)		4	4	4	12

== Results ==
=== Individual endurance ===
30 October

Rank	Athlete	Time
1st place, gold medalist(s)	Essa Al-Mazrouei (UAE) on SW Kapelia	4:44:57
2nd place, silver medalist(s)	Ahmad Al-Bastaki (UAE) on Gepito	4:44:58
3rd place, bronze medalist(s)	Khalifa Rashed Al-Ameemi (UAE) on SW Ikran	4:44:59
4	Sultan Al-Romaihi (BRN) on BK Habanero	4:45:49
5	Abdulrahman Al-Khatri (BRN) on Alcoy Descostieres AA	5:36:19
6	Faisal Al-Anezi (BRN) on Arabec Jamiroquai	5:36:20
7	Bader Al-Anezi (BRN) on Hurricane Kazan	5:45:25
8	Qusai Sami (KSA) on Adham Al-Baraq	6:15:08
9	Abdullah Al-Misned (KSA) on Anqara	6:15:09
10	Salman Al-Qurashi (KSA) on SW Gall	6:15:17
11	Ahmad Naji (JOR) on Volcanik du Fonpeyrol	7:28:20
12	Sui Jiahe (CHN) on H-Millenium Al-Fouva	7:36:48
13	Fares Al-Natour (JOR) on Ifo Boss Rebeka	7:40:40
14	Nurhan Fawwaz Nurhairi (MAS) on Nahess Jednostka	8:05:05
15	He Rungeng (CHN) on Ch'tadore de Saulnay	9:29:07
—	Hou Mingming (CHN) on Kleg	FTQ
—	Nayef Sabt (BRN) on Huzebir du Lebous	FTQ
—	Abdulaziz Al-Mobark (KSA) on Bader Athbah	FTQ
—	Faris Zaquan Faisal (MAS) on Galopin de Mascou	FTQ
—	Wan Nur Irdina Aisya (MAS) on Intruso del Reparo	FTQ
—	Zhang Lizhen (CHN) on Barazan Al-Shaqab	FTQ
—	Rashed Al-Mheiri (UAE) on Elite de la Fichade	FTQ
—	Phyo Kyaw Myint Than (MYA) on Esta Sid El-Khier	FTQ
—	Huang Jinnuo (CHN) on Alaa Al-Jabour	FTQ
—	Ali Abdulla Al-Falasi (UAE) on Bullio Condessa	FTQ
—	Nora Al-Obaidli (KSA) on Volkan de Candesir	FTQ
—	Karam Al-Amari (JOR) on Saqlaawy Baseer	FTQ
—	Abdullah Faqeh (MAS) on Hazza	FTQ
—	Zein Kassim (JOR) on Europe de Kerpont	FTQ
—	Nur Elisya Qistina (MAS) on Rayan	FTQ

=== Team endurance ===
30 October

Rank	Team	Time
1st place, gold medalist(s)	United Arab Emirates (UAE)	14:14:54
2nd place, silver medalist(s)	Bahrain (BRN)	15:58:28
3rd place, bronze medalist(s)	Saudi Arabia (KSA)	18:45:34
—	Jordan (JOR)	FTQ
—	China (CHN)	FTQ
—	Malaysia (MAS)	FTQ

=== Individual jumping ===
26 October

Rank	Athlete	Penalties	Jump-off	
Rank	Athlete	Penalties	Pen.	Time
1st place, gold medalist(s)	Ariel Budriah Jamalullail (MAS) on Panamera Z	0	0	29.85
2nd place, silver medalist(s)	Humam Harith (IRQ) on Ilania	0	0	30.52
3rd place, bronze medalist(s)	Saleh Al-Karbi (UAE) on Espresso	0	0	32.10
4	Akbar Sharipov (UZB) on Affir	0	0	32.12
5	Hussain Al-Kharafi (KUW) on GK C'est un Reve	0	0	34.56
6	Ali Al-Kharafi (KUW) on Othello Optimus	0	0	35.11
7	Eman Daghistani (JOR) on Gloria	0	0	36.08
8	Mohammad Saeed Al-Ghurair (UAE) on Corlyska	0	4	30.47
9	Mashhoor Al-Othaim (KSA) on Cinsello Blue PS	0	4	31.94
10	Mabkhout Al-Kirbi (UAE) on Dubai	0	4	43.82
11	Ammy Xiao (HKG) on Carlton de Sauvageonn	0	4	44.44
12	Alya Al-Mheiri (UAE) on Cento du Rouet	0	8	29.76
13	Abdulaziz Al-Fakhroo (QAT) on Falou	0	8	33.93
14	Taimur Ulserim (JOR) on Ice van de Molenbelt	0	8	51.73
15	Musab Al-Otaibi (KUW) on Jarah	0	RT	
16	Harshyit Arunkumar (IND) on Morocco	2		
17	Suhaim Al-Yafei (QAT) on Gamin Raye	4		
17	Dilshod Shokirov (UZB) on Santos Hippica	4		
17	Yuan Chuanming (CHN) on Ghalli	4		
17	Teuku Rifat Renanda Harsya (INA) on Manchester-Tren	4		
21	Abdulaziz Gohal (KSA) on Api Des Champs	6		
22	Abdulmajeed Al-Khammash (KSA) on Leaper Ibiza GM	8		
22	Ghazi Al-Aboura (JOR) on Nerando BH	8		
22	Avik Bhatia (IND) on Nathan	8		
22	Boburjon Valijonov (UZB) on Jodcasall A-Z	8		
22	Zaid Al-Haram (BRN) on Guilder's Empire of the Sun	8		
22	Jaiveer Varma (IND) on Divine de La Nave	8		
28	Abdulhadi Al-Kahtani (KSA) on Q Mureen	12		
28	Adam Bin Jamal (BRN) on Helmie	12		
30	Mohammad Abu Hamour (JOR) on Mandela	17		
31	Nusrtdinov Zayan Fatih (INA) on Meggie CL	18		
32	Amer Al-Mansoori (QAT) on Honolulu BRL	19		
33	Lalu Yuda Pratama Riady Alwi (INA) on Dontreaux	22		
—	Elly Poh (MAS) on Daisy des Trois Croix	EL		
—	Fang Ziqin (CHN) on Arselina	EL		
—	Al-Sayyid Al-Busaidi (OMA) on Can Can Z	EL		
—	Arissa Audreyna Edzwan (MAS) on Just Special SMH	EL		
—	Gadis Kireina Iskandar (INA) on Kerina	EL		
—	Taha Al-Balushi (OMA) on Utania de Roumard	EL		
—	Sara Al-Kathiri (OMA) on Luett Jung	EL		
—	Hanan Al-Mahmeed (BRN) on Ascouna De Muze Z	EL		
—	Moudhi Al-Jabri (KUW) on Mygros S	EL		
—	Ye Zhen (CHN) on Ravissante D'Elle	EL		
—	Xue Zitong (CHN) on Invictus DXB	EL		
—	Yasmine Bonehill (SGP) on Winnipeg	EL		
—	Chiara Corbi (SGP) on Heavenly Star	EL		
—	Ali Husain Radhi (BRN) on Luna PKZ	EL		
—	Phyo Kyaw Myint Than (MYA) on Mano Kinsky	EL		
—	Krishna Sahithi (IND) on Darido	RT		
—	Mohammed Eisa Al-Bukhari (QAT) on Canao du Lohic	RT		
—	Sonia Aisyah (MAS) on Diamorado vd Lindenhove Z	WD		

=== Team jumping ===
23–24 October

Rank	Team	Round		Total	Jump-off	
Rank	Team	1	2	Total	Pen.	Time
1st place, gold medalist(s)	Jordan (JOR)	0	0	0	0	30.26
2nd place, silver medalist(s)	Qatar (QAT)	0	0	0	0	30.50
3rd place, bronze medalist(s)	Saudi Arabia (KSA)	0	0	0	0	30.72
4	Kuwait (KUW)	0	0	0	0	31.74
5	United Arab Emirates (UAE)	0	0	0	4	40.56
6	Uzbekistan (UZB)	4	0	4		
7	India (IND)	2	4	6		
8	Indonesia (INA)	4	4	8		
9	China (CHN)	16	8	24		
—	Malaysia (MAS)	4	EL	EL		
—	Bahrain (BRN)	31	EL	EL		
—	Oman (OMA)	EL		EL		
