= Camel racing at the 2025 Asian Youth Games =

- Venue: Bahrain Equestrian Endurance Village
- Dates: 27 October 2025

Camel racing at the 2025 Asian Youth Games was held in Sakhir, Bahrain on 27 October 2025 at Bahrain Equestrian Endurance Village. The United Arab Emirates dominated the competition by winning both gold medals.

== Medalists ==
Event	Gold	Silver	Bronze
Boys' 500 m	Mohammed Umair Al-Rashedi; United Arab Emirates	Khalifa Al-Ghfeli; United Arab Emirates	Wasmi Al-Balawi; Saudi Arabia
Girls' 500 m	Latifa Al-Ashkhari; United Arab Emirates	Aisha Al-Saadi; United Arab Emirates	Imaan Salem; Yemen

== Medal table ==
Rank	Nation	Gold	Silver	Bronze	Total
1	United Arab Emirates (UAE)	2	2	0	4
2	Saudi Arabia (KSA)	0	0	1	1
2	Yemen (YEM)	0	0	1	1
Totals (3 entries)		2	2	2	6

== Results ==
=== Boys' 500 m ===
27 October

Rank	Athlete	Time
1st place, gold medalist(s)	Mohammed Umair Al-Rashedi (UAE) on Ghantoot	0:45
2nd place, silver medalist(s)	Khalifa Al-Ghfeli (UAE) on Al-Garm	0:45
3rd place, bronze medalist(s)	Wasmi Al-Balawi (KSA) on Al-Khaleej	0:48
4	Saud Al-Faedy (KSA) on Sahab	0:51
5	Faisal Al-Moammari (BRN) on Siaf	0:52
6	Mahdi Doais (IRQ) on Jabbar	0:56
7	Khadbaataryn Naran-Ölzii (MGL) on Mashour	0:58
8	Suleiman Al-Zawaidah (JOR) on Hamloul	0:58
9	Rishab Rajesh Kadam (IND) on Al-Barrq	1:02
10	Nasser Qubaisi (YEM) on Fares	1:02
11	Mohammad Al-Fathih Abdillah (INA) on Saqr	1:06
12	Hamdan Al-Moammari (BRN) on Shaheen	1:07
13	Hitendra Singh (IND) on Nisnas	1:08
14	Alisher Yuldashev (UZB) on Al-Habub	1:15
15	Mohanad Al-Jutheilat (JOR) on Soghan	1:25
16	Mönkhtöriin Myagmarsüren (MGL) on Yas	1:45
—	Amir Yehya (LBN) on Al-Wasel	DNF

=== Girls' 500 m ===
27 October

Rank	Athlete	Time
1st place, gold medalist(s)	Latifa Al-Ashkhari (UAE) on Hasheem	0:45
2nd place, silver medalist(s)	Aisha Al-Saadi (UAE) on Sarab	0:46
3rd place, bronze medalist(s)	Imaan Salem (YEM) on Thameen	0:46
4	Zainab Abdulwahed (BRN) on Baroud	0:49
5	Al-Anood Kamal (BRN) on Al-Bahrain	0:51
6	Medina Abdurakhmanova (UZB) on Gentleman	0:54
7	Gankhuyagiin Gündegmaa (MGL) on Hajoum	0:58
8	Alisa Sadikova (UZB) on Maihab	1:11
