= India at the Asian Youth Games =

- IOC code: IND
- NOC: Indian Olympic Association
- Medals Ranked 7th: Gold 21 Silver 25 Bronze 27 Total 73

Asian Youth Games appearances (overview)
- 2009; 2013; 2025

India first competed at the Asian Youth Games during the inaugural edition in Singapore. The earned medals in two sports: athletics and swimming. Four of the five gold medals came from athletics and one came from the swimming competition. Aaron Agnel Dsouza was a multiple medal winner. Dsouza won a gold in the 200 m freestyle and a bronze in the 100 m freestyle. India's membership in IOC was suspended when the 2013 games took place so Indian athletes competed in the event as independent athletes.

== Medal table ==
Games	Host	Rank	(gold) Gold	(silver) Silver	(bronze) Bronze	Total
2009 Singapore	Singapore	7	5	3	3	11
2013 Nanjing	China	10	3	4	7	14
2025 Manama	Bahrain	6	13	18	17	48
Total		7	21	25	27	73

== Medals by sport ==
Sport	Rank	(gold) Gold	(silver) Silver	(bronze) Bronze	Total
Athletics	4	5	8	8	21
Beach Wrestling	1	3	2	0	5
Boxing	3	4	2	1	7
Golf	5	0	1	0	1
Judo	12	0	1	2	3
Kabaddi	1	2	0	0	2
Kurash	3	0	1	2	3
Mixed Martial Arts	10	0	1	1	2
Muay	15	0	0	1	1
Shooting	7	0	1	0	1
Squash	2	1	1	1	3
Swimming	13	1	2	1	4
Table tennis	5	0	0	2	2
Taaekwondo	12	0	0	3	3
Tennis	8	0	0	1	1
Weightlifting	5	2	3	2	7
Wrestling	3	3	2	2	7
Total	7	21	25	27	73

== See also ==
- India at the Olympics
- India at the Deaflympics
- India at the Paralympics
- India at the Youth Olympics
- India at the World Games
- India at the Asian Games
- India at the Asian Para Games
- India at the Commonwealth Games
- India at the Lusofonia Games
- India at the South Asian Games
