= Kurash at the 2025 Asian Youth Games =

- Venue: Exhibition World Bahrain
- Dates: 19–20 October 2025

Kurash at the 2025 Asian Youth Games was held in Sakhir, Bahrain from 19 to 20 October 2025 at the Exhibition World Bahrain. It was the debuting appearance of the sport.

== Medalists ==
Event	Gold	Silver	Bronze
Boys' −65 kg	Otabek Yuldashboev; Uzbekistan	Yousef Baghcheghi; Iran	Abubakr Turaev; Tajikistan
Boys' −65 kg	Otabek Yuldashboev; Uzbekistan	Yousef Baghcheghi; Iran	Mohammad Mohammadi; Afghanistan
Boys' −83 kg	Shohjahon Golibov; Uzbekistan	Mehrab Mokarrami; Iran	Arvind; India
Boys' −83 kg	Shohjahon Golibov; Uzbekistan	Mehrab Mokarrami; Iran	Rohullah Nazari; Afghanistan
Girls' −52 kg	Durdona Tursunova; Uzbekistan	Saniet Talaibekova; Kyrgyzstan	Mahsa Barzegar; Iran
Girls' −52 kg	Durdona Tursunova; Uzbekistan	Saniet Talaibekova; Kyrgyzstan	Khushi; India
Girls' −70 kg	Mubinabonu Karimova; Uzbekistan	Kanishka Bidhuri; India	Setayesh Jalaleddin; Iran
Girls' −70 kg	Mubinabonu Karimova; Uzbekistan	Kanishka Bidhuri; India	Leýli Ýusupowa; Turkmenistan

== Medal table ==
Rank	Nation	Gold	Silver	Bronze	Total
1	Uzbekistan (UZB)	4	0	0	4
2	Iran (IRI)	0	2	2	4
3	India (IND)	0	1	2	3
4	Kyrgyzstan (KGZ)	0	1	0	1
5	Afghanistan (AFG)	0	0	2	2
6	Tajikistan (TJK)	0	0	1	1
6	Turkmenistan (TKM)	0	0	1	1
Totals (7 entries)		4	4	8	16

== Results ==
=== Boys' 65 kg ===
19 October

Round of 16
Abubakr Turaev (TJK)	100
Elijah Mendoza (PHI)	000
Fabian Firmansyah (INA)	000
Otabek Yuldashboev (UZB)	100
Baqer Al-Zaidi (IRQ)
Chih Chen-te (TPE)	WO
Muhammet Annaýarow (TKM)	102
Kumpapan Sabrum (THA)	000
Hasan Al-Laith (BRN)	000
Vaibhav Ohri (IND)	100

Quarterfinals
Abaz Toktogonov (KGZ)	000
Abubakr Turaev (TJK)	101
Otabek Yuldashboev (UZB)	012
Chih Chen-te (TPE)	000
Mohammad Mohammadi (AFG)	002
Muhammet Annaýarow (TKM)	001
Yousef Baghcheghi (IRI)	011
Vaibhav Ohri (IND)	000

Semifinals
Abubakr Turaev (TJK)	000
Otabek Yuldashboev (UZB)	002
Mohammad Mohammadi (AFG)	001
Yousef Baghcheghi (IRI)	100

Final
Otabek Yuldashboev (UZB)	002
Yousef Baghcheghi (IRI)	000

=== Boys' 83 kg ===
20 October

Round of 16
Anas Al-Salahat (JOR)	000
Hezretguly Hoşgeldiýew (TKM)	103

Quarterfinals
Shohjahon Golibov (UZB)	100
Hezretguly Hoşgeldiýew (TKM)	000
Arvind (IND)	103
Hilol Davlatzoda (TJK)	001
Rohullah Nazari (AFG)	102
Nurbolot Kanybekov (KGZ)	001
Zeus Babanto (PHI)	001
Mehrab Mokarrami (IRI)	111

Semifinals
Shohjahon Golibov (UZB)	103
Arvind (IND)	000
Rohullah Nazari (AFG)	000
Mehrab Mokarrami (IRI)	100

Final
Shohjahon Golibov (UZB)	112
Mehrab Mokarrami (IRI)	000

=== Girls' 52 kg ===
20 October

Round of 16
Kanishka Bidhuri (IND)	003
Zhibek Tobokelova (KGZ)	001

Quarterfinals
Waratchaya Khundee (THA)	000
Kanishka Bidhuri (IND)	016
Deswita Maharani Putri (INA)	000
Setayesh Jalaleddin (IRI)	100
Mubinabonu Karimova (UZB)	011
Quency Khian Alcantara (PHI)	000
Chen Yun-ya (TPE)	001
Leýli Ýusupowa (TKM)	007

Semifinals
Kanishka Bidhuri (IND)	100
Setayesh Jalaleddin (IRI)	000
Mubinabonu Karimova (UZB)	001
Leýli Ýusupowa (TKM)	000

Final
Kanishka Bidhuri (IND)	001
Mubinabonu Karimova (UZB)	002

=== Girls' 70 kg ===
19 October

Quarterfinals
Syrine Mae Bacani (PHI)	000
Mahsa Barzegar (IRI)	100
Bilbil Mergenowa (TKM)	000
Durdona Tursunova (UZB)	010

Semifinals
Saniet Talaibekova (KGZ)	100
Mahsa Barzegar (IRI)	000
Khushi (IND)	000
Durdona Tursunova (UZB)	013

Final
Saniet Talaibekova (KGZ)	000
Durdona Tursunova (UZB)	110
