= Triathlon at the 2025 Asian Youth Games =

- Venue: Sofitel Bahrain Zallaq Thalassa
- Dates: 23–25 October 2025

Triathlon at the 2025 Asian Youth Games was held in Zallaq, Bahrain from 23 to 25 October 2025.

== Medalists ==
Event	Gold	Silver	Bronze
Boys' super sprint	Li Yansong; China	Ramazan Ainegov; Kazakhstan	Kang Woo-hyeon; South Korea
Girls' super sprint	Xu Enge; China	Bian Zijia; China	Aira Martha Ardistri; Indonesia
Mixed relay	Japan; Yukiho Okuma; Kanta Ine; Tsubomi Yokokura; Main Takata	Indonesia; Aira Martha Ardistri; Wahyu Tri Utomo Sembiring; Maurizka Nur Azizah; Keannan Fathor Arrashy Rolland	Hong Kong; Wong Lok Tung; Wan Chak Yan; Chan Oi Yin; Ting Ngai Chun

== Medal table ==
Rank	Nation	Gold	Silver	Bronze	Total
1	China (CHN)	2	1	0	3
2	Japan (JPN)	1	0	0	1
3	Indonesia (INA)	0	1	1	2
4	Kazakhstan (KAZ)	0	1	0	1
5	Hong Kong (HKG)	0	0	1	1
5	South Korea (KOR)	0	0	1	1
Totals (6 entries)		3	3	3	9

== Results ==
=== Boys' super sprint ===
23 October

Rank	Athlete	Time
1st place, gold medalist(s)	Li Yansong (CHN)	27:04
2nd place, silver medalist(s)	Ramazan Ainegov (KAZ)	27:11
3rd place, bronze medalist(s)	Kang Woo-hyeon (KOR)	27:13
4	Parsa Rasouli (IRI)	27:13
5	Kanta Ine (JPN)	27:20
6	Zhang Xishuo (CHN)	27:49
7	Artyom Bedrin (KAZ)	28:06
8	Wahyu Tri Utomo Sembiring (INA)	28:10
9	Azizullo Abdulkhodiev (UZB)	28:36
10	Leader Matthew Wisanggeni (INA)	28:55
11	Ting Ngai Chun (HKG)	29:09
12	Ryusei Kosaka (JPN)	29:33
13	Thaninthorn Pornnarintip (THA)	29:44
14	Dexter Button (UAE)	29:45
15	Feher Moussa (KSA)	29:59
16	Ng Han Yang (MAS)	30:12
17	Fahad Al-Kaabi (QAT)	30:22
18	Al-Bara Al-Romaihi (BRN)	30:26
19	Matthew Green (UAE)	30:28
20	Atai Kymbatov (KGZ)	30:38
21	Ethan Chang (SGP)	30:41
22	Caleb Barter (SGP)	30:50
23	Wong Jun You (MAS)	31:08
24	Shaheen Al-Kaabi (QAT)	31:15
25	Omar Yasser Ali (BRN)	31:35
—	Adel Al-Malki (BRN)	31:50
26	Danil Veretenov (KGZ)	32:17
27	Khaled Al-Zoobi (LBN)	32:27
—	Ali Al-Kaabi (UAE)	32:57
28	Abdulmohsen Al-Fouzan (KUW)	33:34
29	Lou Iat Long (MAC)	36:49
30	Tüvshintöriin Bayar (MGL)	36:56
—	Wan Chak Yan (HKG)	DNF
—	Euan Arrow Ramos (PHI)	DNF
—	Sancho del Rosario (PHI)	DSQ
—	Yousef Mohammad (KUW)	DSQ
—	Nutprawee Phanomphaithoon (THA)	DSQ
—	Muhammad Azaan Maqbool (PAK)	DSQ
—	Tawfik Joulo (SYR)	DSQ

=== Girls' super sprint ===
23 October

Rank	Athlete	Time
1st place, gold medalist(s)	Xu Enge (CHN)	30:18
2nd place, silver medalist(s)	Bian Zijia (CHN)	30:26
3rd place, bronze medalist(s)	Aira Martha Ardistri (INA)	30:54
4	Yukiho Okuma (JPN)	31:01
5	Wong Lok Tung (HKG)	31:25
6	Tsubomi Yokokura (JPN)	31:32
7	Alua Nurmukhamet (KAZ)	31:42
8	Ng Yuet Hei (HKG)	32:07
9	Bae Eun-sol (KOR)	32:11
10	Kaleriya Shneider (KAZ)	32:21
11	Pitchanart Sripirom (THA)	32:37
12	Ralina Artykhodjaeva (KGZ)	32:42
13	Tatiana Kokina (KGZ)	33:02
14	Nur Isabella Schiering (SGP)	34:20
15	Ramanya Phanridthidam (THA)	36:02
16	Mia Sahyoun (LBN)	36:21
17	Jemma Hadden (SGP)	36:34
18	Sara Al-Fararjeh (JOR)	36:51
19	Maria Al-Haddadein (JOR)	37:43
20	Sofya Al-Oraibi (BRN)	38:05
21	Lulwa Al-Doseri (BRN)	40:47
22	Ayesha Waqas (PAK)	46:26
—	Rand Al-Hadi (SYR)	DSQ
—	Maurizka Nur Azizah (INA)	DSQ

=== Mixed relay ===
25 October

Rank	Team	Time
1st place, gold medalist(s)	Japan (JPN)	1:42:46
2nd place, silver medalist(s)	Indonesia (INA)	1:45:55
3rd place, bronze medalist(s)	Hong Kong (HKG)	1:47:38
4	Thailand (THA)	1:50:23
5	Kyrgyzstan (KGZ)	1:51:50
6	Singapore (SGP)	1:55:30
—	China (CHN)	DSQ
—	Kazakhstan (KAZ)	DSQ
—	Bahrain (BRN)	DSQ
