= Beach wrestling at the 2025 Asian Youth Games =

2025 Asian Youth Games event

- Venue: Sama Bay
- Dates: 30 October 2025

Beach wrestling events at the 2025 Asian Youth Games were held on 30 October at the Sama Bay in Qalali, Bahrain.

== Medalists ==
Event	Gold	Silver	Bronze
Boys' 60 kg	Sani Fulmali; India	Amir Ali Domirkolaei; Iran	Lâm Minh Gia Huy; Vietnam
Boys' 70 kg	Sina Shokouhi; Iran	Sujay Tanpure; India	Hassan Ali; Pakistan
Boys' 80 kg	Touraj Khodaei; Iran	Ravinder; India	Zaid Naghouj; Jordan
Boys' 90 kg	Arjun Ruhil; India	Mohammad Mehdi Fotouhi; Iran	Waleed Al-Muwallad; Saudi Arabia
Girls' 55 kg	Anjali; India	Bùi Ngọc Thảo Thơm; Vietnam	Kanokkon Duangchit; Thailand

== Medal table ==
Rank	Nation	Gold	Silver	Bronze	Total
1	India (IND)	3	2	0	5
2	Iran (IRI)	2	2	0	4
3	Vietnam (VIE)	0	1	1	2
4	Jordan (JOR)	0	0	1	1
4	Pakistan (PAK)	0	0	1	1
4	Saudi Arabia (KSA)	0	0	1	1
4	Thailand (THA)	0	0	1	1
Totals (7 entries)		5	5	5	15

== Results ==
=== Boys' 60 kg ===
30 October

==== Knockout matches ====
Qualifying round
Jassim Al-Saud (KSA)	Fall	Soh Yew Lun (SGP)
Kil Si-won (KOR)	1–3	Sani Fulmali (IND)
Suriyan Songmueangsuk (THA)	3–1	Aseel Al-Mutawa (BRN)

==== Groups ====
Group A
Pos	Athlete	Pld	W	L	IRI	MGL	THA	JOR
1	Amir Ali Domirkolaei (IRI)	3	3	0	—	3–0	Fall	3–0
2	Bayarsaikhany Ochir (MGL)	3	2	1	0–3	—	3–2	3–2
3	Suriyan Songmueangsuk (THA)	3	1	2		2–3	—	WO
4	Mohammad Musleh (JOR)	3	0	3	0–3	2–3		—

Group B
Pos	Athlete	Pld	W	L	IND	VIE	PHI	KSA
1	Sani Fulmali (IND)	3	3	0	—	3–0	Fall	3–0
2	Lâm Minh Gia Huy (VIE)	3	2	1	0–3	—	3–0	Fall
3	Margarito Angana (PHI)	3	1	2		0–3	—	3–1
4	Jassim Al-Saud (KSA)	3	0	3	0–3		1–3	—

Source: UWW

==== Final round ====
Semifinals
Amir Ali Domirkolaei (IRI)	3
Lâm Minh Gia Huy (VIE)	1
Sani Fulmali (IND)	Fall
Bayarsaikhany Ochir (MGL)

Gold medal match
Amir Ali Domirkolaei (IRI)	0
Sani Fulmali (IND)	3
Bronze medal match
Lâm Minh Gia Huy (VIE)	3
Bayarsaikhany Ochir (MGL)	0

=== Boys' 70 kg ===
30 October

==== Knockout matches ====
Qualifying round
Emiliano Sim (SGP)	Fall	Ahmed Al-Kayyadi (KSA)
Markus Iñigo Perez (PHI)	1–3	Sina Shokouhi (IRI)
Sujay Tanpure (IND)	3–0	Naruebordin Chorawek (THA)

==== Groups ====
Group A
Pos	Athlete	Pld	W	L	IND	PAK	KOR	JOR
1	Sujay Tanpure (IND)	3	3	0	—	3–2	Fall	3–0
2	Hassan Ali (PAK)	3	2	1	2–3	—	3–1	3–0
3	Go Kang-hyun (KOR)	3	1	2		1–3	—	2–1
4	Abdelrahman Marafi (JOR)	3	0	3	0–3	0–3	1–2	—

Group B
Pos	Athlete	Pld	W	L	IRI	TJK	KSA	BRN
1	Sina Shokouhi (IRI)	3	3	0	—	3–0	3–0	3–0
2	Idris Bakhromov (TJK)	3	2	1	0–3	—	3–0	3–0
3	Ahmed Al-Kayyadi (KSA)	3	1	2	0–3	0–3	—	3–1
4	Abdulla Qahtan (BRN)	3	0	3	0–3	0–3	1–3	—

Source: UWW

==== Final round ====
Semifinals
Sujay Tanpure (IND)	4
Idris Bakhromov (TJK)	0
Sina Shokouhi (IRI)	3
Hassan Ali (PAK)	2

Gold medal match
Sujay Tanpure (IND)	1
Sina Shokouhi (IRI)	3
Bronze medal match
Idris Bakhromov (TJK)	0
Hassan Ali (PAK)	3

=== Boys' 80 kg ===
30 October

==== Groups ====
Group A
Pos	Athlete	Pld	W	L	IRI	JOR	TJK
1	Touraj Khodaei (IRI)	2	2	0	—	3–0	3–0
2	Zaid Naghouj (JOR)	2	1	1	0–3	—	3–1
3	Alirizo Bakhromov (TJK)	2	0	2	0–3	1–3	—

Group B
Pos	Athlete	Pld	W	L	IND	PAK	KOR	KSA
1	Ravinder (IND)	3	3	0	—	3–2	3–1	3–2
2	Muhammad Abdul Rehman (PAK)	3	2	1	2–3	—	3–2	3–0
3	Kim Ye-chan (KOR)	3	1	2	1–3	2–3	—	3–0
4	Hamed Majrashi (KSA)	3	0	3	2–3	0–3	0–3	—

Source: UWW

==== Final round ====
Semifinals
Touraj Khodaei (IRI)	3
Muhammad Abdul Rehman (PAK)	0
Ravinder (IND)	3
Zaid Naghouj (JOR)	0

Gold medal match
Touraj Khodaei (IRI)	3
Ravinder (IND)	1
Bronze medal match
Muhammad Abdul Rehman (PAK)	2
Zaid Naghouj (JOR)	3

=== Boys' 90 kg ===
30 October

==== Groups ====
Group A
Pos	Athlete	Pld	W	L	IRI	VIE	KOR	JOR
1	Mohammad Mehdi Fotouhi (IRI)	3	3	0	—	3–0	3–0	4–0
2	Phạm Huỳnh Minh Hiếu (VIE)	3	2	1	0–3	—	3–0	3–0
3	Choe Wan-gyu (KOR)	3	1	2	0–3	0–3	—	3–0
4	Mohammad Dahshan (JOR)	3	0	3	0–4	0–3	0–3	—

Group B
Pos	Athlete	Pld	W	L	IND	KSA	BRN	THA
1	Arjun Ruhil (IND)	3	3	0	—	3–0	Fall	4–1
2	Waleed Al-Muwallad (KSA)	3	2	1	0–3	—	Fall	3–0
3	Ali Zaman (BRN)	3	1	2			—	Fall
4	Suphawat Soprakhon (THA)	3	0	3	1–4	0–3		—

Source: UWW

==== Final round ====
Semifinals
Mohammad Mehdi Fotouhi (IRI)	3
Waleed Al-Muwallad (KSA)	0
Arjun Ruhil (IND)	Fall
Phạm Huỳnh Minh Hiếu (VIE)

Gold medal match
Mohammad Mehdi Fotouhi (IRI)	2
Arjun Ruhil (IND)	3
Bronze medal match
Waleed Al-Muwallad (KSA)	Fall
Phạm Huỳnh Minh Hiếu (VIE)

=== Girls' 55 kg ===
30 October

==== Groups ====
Group A
Pos	Athlete	Pld	W	L	IND	THA	JOR
1	Anjali (IND)	2	2	0	—	3–0	3–0
2	Kanokkon Duangchit (THA)	2	1	1	0–3	—	3–1
3	Layan Qawasmi (JOR)	2	0	2	0–3	1–3	—

Group B
Pos	Athlete	Pld	W	L	VIE	PHI	BRN
1	Bùi Ngọc Thảo Thơm (VIE)	2	2	0	—	3–0	Fall
2	Ella Olaso (PHI)	2	1	1	0–3	—	Fall
3	Sajoud Jadia (BRN)	2	0	2			—

Source: UWW

==== Final round ====
Semifinals
Anjali (IND)	3
Ella Olaso (PHI)	0
Bùi Ngọc Thảo Thơm (VIE)	3
Kanokkon Duangchit (THA)	0

Gold medal match
Anjali (IND)	3
Bùi Ngọc Thảo Thơm (VIE)	1
Bronze medal match
Ella Olaso (PHI)	2
Kanokkon Duangchit (THA)	3
