= Wrestling at the 2025 Asian Youth Games =

- Venue: Exhibition World Bahrain
- Dates: 28–29 October 2025

Wrestling at the 2025 Asian Youth Games was held in Sakhir, Bahrain from 28 to 29 October 2025 at the Exhibition World Bahrain.

== Medalists ==
=== Boys' freestyle ===
Event	Gold	Silver	Bronze
45 kg	Parsa Tahmasebi; Iran	Adilet Mukanbetov; Kyrgyzstan	Mirjalol Mukammilov; Uzbekistan
45 kg	Parsa Tahmasebi; Iran	Adilet Mukanbetov; Kyrgyzstan	Bakdaulet Agabek; Kazakhstan
48 kg	Masamune Ushimado; Japan	Shakhobidin Nurmanov; Uzbekistan	Sabyrzhan Rakhatov; Kazakhstan
48 kg	Masamune Ushimado; Japan	Shakhobidin Nurmanov; Uzbekistan	Arnur Nursaidov; Kyrgyzstan
51 kg	Ulugbek Rashidov; Uzbekistan	Arman Elahi; Iran	Nurakhmad Sarybaev; Kyrgyzstan
51 kg	Ulugbek Rashidov; Uzbekistan	Arman Elahi; Iran	Haruku Shiina; Japan
55 kg	Jaiveer Singh; India	Yamato Furusawa; Japan	Abdumalik Jaloldinov; Uzbekistan
55 kg	Jaiveer Singh; India	Yamato Furusawa; Japan	Ibrahim Yskakbek; Kazakhstan
60 kg	Bekassyl Assambek; Kazakhstan	Yu Yong-hun; North Korea	Taha Hashemi; Iran
60 kg	Bekassyl Assambek; Kazakhstan	Yu Yong-hun; North Korea	Fakhriddin Nasriddinov; Uzbekistan
65 kg	Morteza Hajmollamohammadi; Iran	Gourav Punia; India	Shokhiddin Aliev; Uzbekistan
65 kg	Morteza Hajmollamohammadi; Iran	Gourav Punia; India	Yeraly Askerbek; Kazakhstan
71 kg	Amir Mohammad Zarinkam; Iran	Satoya Kobayashi; Japan	Farrukhbek Jumanazarov; Uzbekistan
71 kg	Amir Mohammad Zarinkam; Iran	Satoya Kobayashi; Japan	Nurtay Narov; Kazakhstan
80 kg	Bunyod Rufatov; Uzbekistan	Byambadorjiin Buyantogtokh; Mongolia	Alirizo Bakhromov; Tajikistan
80 kg	Bunyod Rufatov; Uzbekistan	Byambadorjiin Buyantogtokh; Mongolia	Mohammad Parsa Karami; Iran

=== Girls' freestyle ===
Event	Gold	Silver	Bronze
40 kg	Mukhlisa Masharipova; Uzbekistan	An Nakanishi; Japan	Jo Hyon-gyong; North Korea
40 kg	Mukhlisa Masharipova; Uzbekistan	An Nakanishi; Japan	None awarded
43 kg	Huang Xin; China	Shokhista Shonazarova; Uzbekistan	Rachana; India
43 kg	Huang Xin; China	Shokhista Shonazarova; Uzbekistan	Mira Higashi; Japan
46 kg	Kim Hyon-i; North Korea	Yuan Yuting; China	Mekhribonu Kudaynazarova; Uzbekistan
46 kg	Kim Hyon-i; North Korea	Yuan Yuting; China	Hanano Oya; Japan
49 kg	Yuu Katsume; Japan	Asel Toktosun Kyzy; Kyrgyzstan	Komal Verma; India
49 kg	Yuu Katsume; Japan	Asel Toktosun Kyzy; Kyrgyzstan	Nattaporn Nokrod; Thailand
53 kg	Nana Kozuka; Japan	Saniya Soltangali; Kazakhstan	Jiang Jiaqing; China
53 kg	Nana Kozuka; Japan	Saniya Soltangali; Kazakhstan	Asema Torogeldieva; Kyrgyzstan
57 kg	Moni; India	Sezim Zholdoshbekova; Kyrgyzstan	Xu Xiaohan; China
57 kg	Moni; India	Sezim Zholdoshbekova; Kyrgyzstan	Dilnura Avezova; Uzbekistan
61 kg	Yashita Rana; India	Zhaidar Mukat; Kazakhstan	Waka Awano; Japan
61 kg	Yashita Rana; India	Zhaidar Mukat; Kazakhstan	Akylai Chynybaeva; Kyrgyzstan
69 kg	Zhao Min; China	Ashvini Vishnoi; India	Nuraiym Saiakhmet; Kazakhstan
69 kg	Zhao Min; China	Ashvini Vishnoi; India	Mukhayyo Rakhimjonova; Uzbekistan

== Medal table ==
Rank	Nation	Gold	Silver	Bronze	Total
1	Japan (JPN)	3	3	4	10
2	Uzbekistan (UZB)	3	2	8	13
3	India (IND)	3	2	2	7
4	Iran (IRI)	3	1	2	6
5	China (CHN)	2	1	2	5
6	Kazakhstan (KAZ)	1	2	6	9
7	North Korea (PRK)	1	1	1	3
8	Kyrgyzstan (KGZ)	0	3	4	7
9	Mongolia (MGL)	0	1	0	1
10	Tajikistan (TJK)	0	0	1	1
10	Thailand (THA)	0	0	1	1
Totals (11 entries)		16	16	31	63

== Results ==
=== Boys' freestyle ===
==== 45 kg ====
28 October

Qualifications
Mirjalol Mukammilov (UZB)	5
Adilet Mukanbetov (KGZ)	10^{F}
Riku Furusawa (JPN)	6
Parsa Tahmasebi (IRI)	8

Quarterfinals
Abdulrahman Al-Hamami (YEM)	0
Adilet Mukanbetov (KGZ)	10
John Roe Malazarte (PHI)	8
Vinod Dilshan (SRI)	13
Bakdaulet Agabek (KAZ)	10
Arunchai Sawatdee (THA)	0
Parsa Tahmasebi (IRI)	8
Huang Yongqiang (CHN)	2

Semifinals
Adilet Mukanbetov (KGZ)	10
Vinod Dilshan (SRI)	0
Bakdaulet Agabek (KAZ)	1
Parsa Tahmasebi (IRI)	7

Final
Adilet Mukanbetov (KGZ)	2
Parsa Tahmasebi (IRI)	6

Repechage round 1
Mirjalol Mukammilov (UZB)	10
Abdulrahman Al-Hamami (YEM)	0
Riku Furusawa (JPN)	10
Huang Yongqiang (CHN)	0

Bronze medal match
Mirjalol Mukammilov (UZB)	10
Vinod Dilshan (SRI)	0
Riku Furusawa (JPN)	2
Bakdaulet Agabek (KAZ)	3

==== 48 kg ====
29 October

Qualifications
Hasan Al-Balooshi (BRN)	17
Warat Fangsai (THA)	15^{F}
Shivam (IND)	1
Sabyrzhan Rakhatov (KAZ)	1
Saad Al-Subaie (KSA)	9
Mahmood Al-Areqi (YEM)	8
Masamune Ushimado (JPN)	11
Khean Carl Sabuelo (PHI)	0

Quarterfinals
Shakhobidin Nurmanov (UZB)	10
Warat Fangsai (THA)	0
Sabyrzhan Rakhatov (KAZ)	8^{F}
Ahmad Mudaser Painda (AFG)	0
Arnur Nursaidov (KGZ)	10
Saad Al-Subaie (KSA)	0
Masamune Ushimado (JPN)	5
Sina Boustani (IRI)	0

Semifinals
Shakhobidin Nurmanov (UZB)	9
Sabyrzhan Rakhatov (KAZ)	4
Arnur Nursaidov (KGZ)	4
Masamune Ushimado (JPN)	9

Final
Shakhobidin Nurmanov (UZB)	7
Masamune Ushimado (JPN)	12

Repechage round 1
Khean Carl Sabuelo (PHI)	0
Sina Boustani (IRI)	10^{F}

Bronze medal match
Warat Fangsai (THA)	0
Sabyrzhan Rakhatov (KAZ)	10
Sina Boustani (IRI)	0
Arnur Nursaidov (KGZ)	5

==== 51 kg ====
28 October

Qualifications
Nurakhmad Sarybaev (KGZ)	4
Omar Musleh (JOR)	0
Emomali Davlatov (TJK)	12
Saood Salman (BRN)	1
Kemal Çaryýew (TKM)	8
Nathaniel Nama (PHI)	5
Theekshana Karunarathna (SRI)	0
Danayel Abdykassym (KAZ)	10
Narongrit Sakuna (THA)	0
Haruku Shiina (JPN)	10^{F}

Quarterfinals
Arman Elahi (IRI)	5
Nurakhmad Sarybaev (KGZ)	0
Emomali Davlatov (TJK)	8
Kemal Çaryýew (TKM)	2
Ulugbek Rashidov (UZB)	7
Danayel Abdykassym (KAZ)	0
Haruku Shiina (JPN)	9
Liang Xiyi (CHN)	4

Semifinals
Arman Elahi (IRI)	6
Emomali Davlatov (TJK)	4
Ulugbek Rashidov (UZB)	11
Haruku Shiina (JPN)	0

Final
Arman Elahi (IRI)	4
Ulugbek Rashidov (UZB)	4

Bronze medal match
Nurakhmad Sarybaev (KGZ)	11^{F}
Emomali Davlatov (TJK)	0
Danayel Abdykassym (KAZ)	4
Haruku Shiina (JPN)	5

==== 55 kg ====
29 October

Qualifications
Thanwarak Kaewthipmontree (THA)	0–10	Abdumalik Jaloldinov (UZB)
Nimesh Dulanjana (SRI)	0–10	Jaiveer Singh (IND)

Round of 16
Ma Chengzhuang (CHN)	8^{F}
Talal Al-Shebi (QAT)	0
Abdumalik Jaloldinov (UZB)	10
Mohammad Omar Zurmatay (AFG)	0
Lloyd Allen Balbaboco (PHI)	0
Jhong Jyun-hua (TPE)	10
Yamato Furusawa (JPN)	10
Kyrgyzbai Kenensariev (KGZ)	0
Kim Kwang-ryong (PRK)	10
Umar Rakhimov (TJK)	0
Ibrahim Yskakbek (KAZ)	10
Abdyljelil Tejenow (TKM)	0
Phann Chan Ou Dom (CAM)	0
Jaiveer Singh (IND)	10
Yasin Zarezadeh (IRI)	10
Aseel Al-Mutawa (BRN)	0

Quarterfinals
Ma Chengzhuang (CHN)	1
Abdumalik Jaloldinov (UZB)	8
Jhong Jyun-hua (TPE)	0
Yamato Furusawa (JPN)	8^{F}
Kim Kwang-ryong (PRK)	3
Ibrahim Yskakbek (KAZ)	3
Jaiveer Singh (IND)	4
Yasin Zarezadeh (IRI)	4

Semifinals
Abdumalik Jaloldinov (UZB)	0
Yamato Furusawa (JPN)	10
Ibrahim Yskakbek (KAZ)	0
Jaiveer Singh (IND)	5

Final
Yamato Furusawa (JPN)	6
Jaiveer Singh (IND)	2^{F}

Repechage round 1
Nimesh Dulanjana (SRI)	10
Phann Chan Ou Dom (CAM)	0

Repechage round 2
Kyrgyzbai Kenensariev (KGZ)	10
Jhong Jyun-hua (TPE)	0
Nimesh Dulanjana (SRI)	0
Yasin Zarezadeh (IRI)	10

Bronze medal match
Kyrgyzbai Kenensariev (KGZ)	0
Abdumalik Jaloldinov (UZB)	9
Yasin Zarezadeh (IRI)	0
Ibrahim Yskakbek (KAZ)	10

==== 60 kg ====
28 October

Qualifications
Dirushanth Sanjeev (SRI)	0–10	Yokub Ibronov (TJK)
Zhou Yu-en (TPE)	0–10	Yu Yong-hun (PRK)

Round of 16
Bekassyl Assambek (KAZ)	10
Rihito Hiura (JPN)	0
Yokub Ibronov (TJK)	12
Nadeem Haleem (PLE)	2
Phuriwat Saelim (THA)	0
Mohammad Sarwar Sarwari (AFG)	10
Taha Hashemi (IRI)	WO
Abdulla Qahtan (BRN)
Mohammad Musleh (JOR)	11
Saeed Majrashi (KSA)	1
Mukhamed Sharipov (KGZ)	10
Soh Yew Lun (SGP)	0
Li Ao (CHN)	0
Yu Yong-hun (PRK)	9^{F}
Sylvester Pasigian (PHI)	0
Fakhriddin Nasriddinov (UZB)	10

Quarterfinals
Bekassyl Assambek (KAZ)	12
Yokub Ibronov (TJK)	0
Mohammad Sarwar Sarwari (AFG)	7
Taha Hashemi (IRI)	8
Mohammad Musleh (JOR)	2
Mukhamed Sharipov (KGZ)	8
Yu Yong-hun (PRK)	2
Fakhriddin Nasriddinov (UZB)	0

Semifinals
Bekassyl Assambek (KAZ)	6
Taha Hashemi (IRI)	4
Mukhamed Sharipov (KGZ)	0
Yu Yong-hun (PRK)	11

Final
Bekassyl Assambek (KAZ)	4
Yu Yong-hun (PRK)	1

Repechage round 1
Zhou Yu-en (TPE)	10
Li Ao (CHN)	4

Repechage round 2
Rihito Hiura (JPN)	13
Yokub Ibronov (TJK)	13
Zhou Yu-en (TPE)	0
Fakhriddin Nasriddinov (UZB)	4^{F}

Bronze medal match
Yokub Ibronov (TJK)	3
Taha Hashemi (IRI)	9
Fakhriddin Nasriddinov (UZB)	10
Mukhamed Sharipov (KGZ)	0

==== 65 kg ====
29 October

Qualifications
Morteza Hajmollamohammadi (IRI)	10
Charles Johnson Calawen (PHI)	0
Hamza Nafish (JOR)	0
Ryohei Maruta (JPN)	10
Muhammad Abdul Rehman (PAK)	0
Shokhiddin Aliev (UZB)	6
Gourav Punia (IND)	12
Wu Changxin (CHN)	1
Turki Dahal (KSA)	2
Umyt Gylyjow (TKM)	12
Anucha Kanchoei (THA)	0
Seneru Dilmith (SRI)	13
Naser Zaman (BRN)	0
Yeraly Askerbek (KAZ)	10

Quarterfinals
Iakhebek Ganiev (KGZ)	2
Morteza Hajmollamohammadi (IRI)	11^{F}
Ryohei Maruta (JPN)	8
Shokhiddin Aliev (UZB)	10
Gourav Punia (IND)	12
Umyt Gylyjow (TKM)	2
Seneru Dilmith (SRI)	0
Yeraly Askerbek (KAZ)	4^{F}

Semifinals
Morteza Hajmollamohammadi (IRI)	6
Shokhiddin Aliev (UZB)	4
Gourav Punia (IND)	3
Yeraly Askerbek (KAZ)	2

Final
Morteza Hajmollamohammadi (IRI)	4
Gourav Punia (IND)	1

Repechage round 1
Charles Johnson Calawen (PHI)	0
Iakhebek Ganiev (KGZ)	10
Wu Changxin (CHN)	7
Umyt Gylyjow (TKM)	0

Bronze medal match
Iakhebek Ganiev (KGZ)	3
Shokhiddin Aliev (UZB)	5
Wu Changxin (CHN)	7
Yeraly Askerbek (KAZ)	13

==== 71 kg ====
28 October

Qualifications
Abdelrahman Marafi (JOR)	4
Hassan Ali (PAK)	6
Farrukhbek Jumanazarov (UZB)	10
Kapil Dahiya (IND)	0
Angelo Lucian Salud (PHI)	0
Amir Mohammad Zarinkam (IRI)	12
Enkhbaataryn Narantulga (MGL)	11^{F}
Khwaja Mujtaba Sidiqi (AFG)	0
Nursultan Ishengaziev (KGZ)	8
Qu Junfeng (CHN)	1
Nurtay Narov (KAZ)	10
Phanuphat Chailoes (THA)	0
Satoya Kobayashi (JPN)	2^{F}
Emiliano Sim (SGP)	0

Quarterfinals
Ayubjon Bozorzoda (TJK)	13
Hassan Ali (PAK)	2
Farrukhbek Jumanazarov (UZB)	3
Amir Mohammad Zarinkam (IRI)	4
Enkhbaataryn Narantulga (MGL)	10
Nursultan Ishengaziev (KGZ)	1
Nurtay Narov (KAZ)	1
Satoya Kobayashi (JPN)	6

Semifinals
Ayubjon Bozorzoda (TJK)	3
Amir Mohammad Zarinkam (IRI)	8
Enkhbaataryn Narantulga (MGL)	0
Satoya Kobayashi (JPN)	5

Final
Amir Mohammad Zarinkam (IRI)	11
Satoya Kobayashi (JPN)	0

Repechage round 1
Angelo Lucian Salud (PHI)	0
Farrukhbek Jumanazarov (UZB)	10
Emiliano Sim (SGP)	0
Nurtay Narov (KAZ)	10

Bronze medal match
Farrukhbek Jumanazarov (UZB)	4
Ayubjon Bozorzoda (TJK)	2
Nurtay Narov (KAZ)	11
Enkhbaataryn Narantulga (MGL)	0

==== 80 kg ====
29 October

Qualifications
Alirizo Bakhromov (TJK)	10
Anawat Aintakaeo (THA)	0
Faisal Malhas (JOR)	1
Byambadorjiin Buyantogtokh (MGL)	11
Arslan Azymberdiýew (TKM)	0
Bunyod Rufatov (UZB)	10
Mohammad Parsa Karami (IRI)	10
Zeng Enqin (CHN)	0

Quarterfinals
Erbol Eshmatov (KGZ)	0
Alirizo Bakhromov (TJK)	6^{F}
Byambadorjiin Buyantogtokh (MGL)	10
Ameer Khalil (PLE)	0
Haruta Shiotsuka (JPN)	0
Bunyod Rufatov (UZB)	10
Mohammad Parsa Karami (IRI)	9
Saurabh Yadav (IND)	4

Semifinals
Alirizo Bakhromov (TJK)	4
Byambadorjiin Buyantogtokh (MGL)	5
Bunyod Rufatov (UZB)	10
Mohammad Parsa Karami (IRI)	0

Final
Byambadorjiin Buyantogtokh (MGL)	0
Bunyod Rufatov (UZB)	11

Repechage round 1
Faisal Malhas (JOR)	1
Ameer Khalil (PLE)	6
Arslan Azymberdiýew (TKM)	4
Haruta Shiotsuka (JPN)	15

Bronze medal match
Ameer Khalil (PLE)	0
Alirizo Bakhromov (TJK)	11
Haruta Shiotsuka (JPN)	0
Mohammad Parsa Karami (IRI)	4

=== Girls' freestyle ===
==== 40 kg ====
28 October

===== Groups =====
Group A
Pos	Athlete	Pld	W	L	CP	JPN	UZB	KGZ
1	An Nakanishi (JPN)	2	2	0	6	—	8–0	4–1
2	Mukhlisa Masharipova (UZB)	2	1	1	4	0–3 PO	—	15–4
3	Asema Asangaryeva (KGZ)	2	0	2	2	1–3 PO1	1–4 SU1	—

Group B
Pos	Athlete	Pld	W	L	CP	PRK	THA	PHI
1	Jo Hyon-gyong (PRK)	2	2	0	9	—	3–0 Fall	10–0
2	Sutasinie Phanak (THA)	2	1	1	3	0–5 FA	—	10–1
3	Rhea Mae Damiao (PHI)	2	0	2	1	0–4 SU	1–3 PO1	—

Source: UWW

===== Final round =====
Semifinals
An Nakanishi (JPN)	10
Sutasinie Phanak (THA)	0
Jo Hyon-gyong (PRK)	4
Mukhlisa Masharipova (UZB)	8

Final
An Nakanishi (JPN)	1
Mukhlisa Masharipova (UZB)	2
Bronze medal match
Sutasinie Phanak (THA)	0
Jo Hyon-gyong (PRK)	4^{F}

==== 43 kg ====
29 October

Quarterfinals		Semifinals		Final
Rachana (IND)	4^{F}
Inzhu Bakkozha (KAZ)	0	Rachana (IND)	2
Shokhista Shonazarova (UZB)	10	Shokhista Shonazarova (UZB)	5
Aizhan Kabylbekova (KGZ)	0			Shokhista Shonazarova (UZB)	2
Huang Xin (CHN)	10			Huang Xin (CHN)	4
Deshika Sathsarani (SRI)	0	Huang Xin (CHN)	3
Mira Higashi (JPN)	7^{F}	Mira Higashi (JPN)	0
Charinrat Kuncharin (THA)	0

Bronze medal match
Aizhan Kabylbekova (KGZ)	0
Rachana (IND)	11
Deshika Sathsarani (SRI)	0
Mira Higashi (JPN)	4^{F}

==== 46 kg ====
28 October

Qualifications
Mekhribonu Kudaynazarova (UZB)	2
Yuan Yuting (CHN)	6^{F}
Akak Mambetsadykova (KGZ)	0
Hanano Oya (JPN)	10

Quarterfinals
Paramaporn Cholsin (THA)	0
Yuan Yuting (CHN)	2^{F}
LJ Xyserlyn Dongpopen (PHI)	11
Phat Leanghy (CAM)	0
Kim Hyon-i (PRK)	10
Shynaiy Maken (KAZ)	0
Hanano Oya (JPN)	10
Yohani Savindi Bandara (SRI)	0

Semifinals
Yuan Yuting (CHN)	10
LJ Xyserlyn Dongpopen (PHI)	0
Kim Hyon-i (PRK)	4
Hanano Oya (JPN)	1

Final
Yuan Yuting (CHN)	2
Kim Hyon-i (PRK)	4

Repechage round 1
Mekhribonu Kudaynazarova (UZB)	10
Paramaporn Cholsin (THA)	0

Bronze medal match
Mekhribonu Kudaynazarova (UZB)	4^{F}
LJ Xyserlyn Dongpopen (PHI)	0
Shynaiy Maken (KAZ)	0
Hanano Oya (JPN)	10

==== 49 kg ====
29 October

Qualifications
Mo Xiaoqing (CHN)	0
Yuu Katsume (JPN)	10
Asel Toktosun Kyzy (KGZ)	12^{F}
Nattaporn Nokrod (THA)	1

Quarterfinals
Cheng Yu-hsi (TPE)	0
Yuu Katsume (JPN)	10
Mashkhura Abdumusaeva (UZB)	1
Komal Verma (IND)	6
Mun Sreypin (CAM)	0
Charmel Gem Angana (PHI)	10
Asel Toktosun Kyzy (KGZ)	8^{F}
Kithmi Herath (SRI)	0

Semifinals
Yuu Katsume (JPN)	10
Komal Verma (IND)	0
Charmel Gem Angana (PHI)	0
Asel Toktosun Kyzy (KGZ)	10

Final
Yuu Katsume (JPN)	4^{F}
Asel Toktosun Kyzy (KGZ)	0

Repechage round 1
Mo Xiaoqing (CHN)	10
Cheng Yu-hsi (TPE)	0
Nattaporn Nokrod (THA)	8^{F}
Kithmi Herath (SRI)	0

Bronze medal match
Mo Xiaoqing (CHN)	1
Komal Verma (IND)	3
Nattaporn Nokrod (THA)	6
Charmel Gem Angana (PHI)	4

==== 53 kg ====
28 October

Qualifications
Munisa Mingyasharova (UZB)	10
Jamila Aasya Lumanog (PHI)	0
Chonticha Powiset (THA)	8^{F}
Layan Qawasmi (JOR)	4

Quarterfinals
Piyumi Sathsarani (SRI)	0
Munisa Mingyasharova (UZB)	10
Nana Kozuka (JPN)	12
Jiang Jiaqing (CHN)	2
Saniya Soltangali (KAZ)	13
Asema Torogeldieva (KGZ)	1
Chonticha Powiset (THA)	0
Hsiao Chiao-shih (TPE)	2^{F}

Semifinals
Munisa Mingyasharova (UZB)	6
Nana Kozuka (JPN)	10
Saniya Soltangali (KAZ)	8^{F}
Hsiao Chiao-shih (TPE)	4

Final
Nana Kozuka (JPN)	10
Saniya Soltangali (KAZ)	0

Bronze medal match
Jiang Jiaqing (CHN)	2^{F}
Munisa Mingyasharova (UZB)	2
Asema Torogeldieva (KGZ)	10
Hsiao Chiao-shih (TPE)	0

==== 57 kg ====
29 October

Qualifications
Dewmini Ranaweera (SRI)	0
Moni (IND)	10

Quarterfinals
Nunthawan Nathakham (THA)	0
Moni (IND)	4^{F}
Arpita Biswas (BAN)	0
Xu Xiaohan (CHN)	10
Sayuki Tanada (JPN)	2
Dilnura Avezova (UZB)	3
Gilian Pauline Nietes (PHI)	0
Sezim Zholdoshbekova (KGZ)	4^{F}

Semifinals
Moni (IND)	8^{F}
Xu Xiaohan (CHN)	0
Dilnura Avezova (UZB)	4
Sezim Zholdoshbekova (KGZ)	7^{F}

Final
Moni (IND)	10
Sezim Zholdoshbekova (KGZ)	0

Repechage round 1
Dewmini Ranaweera (SRI)	13
Nunthawan Nathakham (THA)	2

Bronze medal match
Dewmini Ranaweera (SRI)	0
Xu Xiaohan (CHN)	10
Gilian Pauline Nietes (PHI)	0
Dilnura Avezova (UZB)	10

==== 61 kg ====
28 October

Qualifications
Dong Zichen (CHN)	4
Waka Awano (JPN)	7

Quarterfinals
Miriam Grace Balisme (PHI)	0
Waka Awano (JPN)	10
Thirada Phihusut (THA)	0
Zhaidar Mukat (KAZ)	8^{F}
Akylai Chynybaeva (KGZ)	8^{F}
Mönkhbayasgalangiin Khüslen (MGL)	2
Yashita Rana (IND)	4
Feruza Kairatdinova (UZB)	1

Semifinals
Waka Awano (JPN)	4
Zhaidar Mukat (KAZ)	4
Akylai Chynybaeva (KGZ)	0
Yashita Rana (IND)	6^{F}

Final
Zhaidar Mukat (KAZ)	5
Yashita Rana (IND)	5

Bronze medal match
Thirada Phihusut (THA)	0
Waka Awano (JPN)	10
Feruza Kairatdinova (UZB)	1
Akylai Chynybaeva (KGZ)	7

==== 69 kg ====
29 October

Qualifications
Nuraiym Saiakhmet (KAZ)	8^{F}
Mohona Khatun (BAN)	0

Quarterfinals
Ashvini Vishnoi (IND)	5
Nuraiym Saiakhmet (KAZ)	0
Aiana Asamalikova (KGZ)	3
Mao Teraoka (JPN)	0
Amarsaikhany Gereltuyaa (MGL)	8^{F}
Rungthiwa Chandai (THA)	0
Mukhayyo Rakhimjonova (UZB)	2
Zhao Min (CHN)	6

Semifinals
Ashvini Vishnoi (IND)	3^{F}
Aiana Asamalikova (KGZ)	0
Amarsaikhany Gereltuyaa (MGL)	6
Zhao Min (CHN)	17^{F}

Final
Ashvini Vishnoi (IND)	3
Zhao Min (CHN)	10

Bronze medal match
Nuraiym Saiakhmet (KAZ)	3
Aiana Asamalikova (KGZ)	1
Mukhayyo Rakhimjonova (UZB)	8^{F}
Amarsaikhany Gereltuyaa (MGL)	0
