= Boxing at the 2025 Asian Youth Games =

2025 Asian Youth Games competition

- Venue: Exhibition World Bahrain
- Dates: 23–30 October 2025

Boxing at the 2025 Asian Youth Games was held in Sakhir, Bahrain from 23 to 30 October 2025 at the Exhibition World Bahrain. It was the debuting appearance of the sport.

== Medalists ==
=== Boys ===
Event	Gold	Silver	Bronze
Pinweight; 46 kg	Abdugani Yorkinjonov; Uzbekistan	Arman Myrsabit; Kazakhstan	Leo Mhar Lobrido; Philippines
Pinweight; 46 kg	Abdugani Yorkinjonov; Uzbekistan	Arman Myrsabit; Kazakhstan	Damir Nazarov; Tajikistan
Flyweight; 50 kg	Zhumagali Nurmakhan; Kazakhstan	Lanchenba Singh; India	An Phyong-guk; North Korea
Flyweight; 50 kg	Zhumagali Nurmakhan; Kazakhstan	Lanchenba Singh; India	Kira Hasegawa; Japan
Bantamweight; 54 kg	Doszhan Zhumakan; Kazakhstan	Matin Chamipa; Iran	Ryusei Kitamura; Japan
Bantamweight; 54 kg	Doszhan Zhumakan; Kazakhstan	Matin Chamipa; Iran	Motaz Al-Mashaleh; Jordan
Lightweight; 60 kg	Ibrokhim Shokirjonov; Uzbekistan	Zubair Akramov; Kyrgyzstan	Abubakr Azizov; Tajikistan
Lightweight; 60 kg	Ibrokhim Shokirjonov; Uzbekistan	Zubair Akramov; Kyrgyzstan	Zhang Zhengkun; China
Welterweight; 66 kg	Daniyal Shalkarbay; Kazakhstan	Saidkhuja Sadillakhujaev; Uzbekistan	Anant Deshmukh; India
Welterweight; 66 kg	Daniyal Shalkarbay; Kazakhstan	Saidkhuja Sadillakhujaev; Uzbekistan	Farzan Ahmadi; Iran
Middleweight; 75 kg	Diyorbek Murodilloev; Uzbekistan	Mehrshad Sherafatmand; Iran	Sanzhar Matassov; Kazakhstan
Middleweight; 75 kg	Diyorbek Murodilloev; Uzbekistan	Mehrshad Sherafatmand; Iran	Guan Yiwen; China
Heavyweight +80 kg	Asadbek Sultanboev; Uzbekistan	Mukhamedali Rustembek; Kazakhstan	Farhoud Ghorbani; Iran
Heavyweight +80 kg	Asadbek Sultanboev; Uzbekistan	Mukhamedali Rustembek; Kazakhstan	Zuber Salih; Iraq

=== Girls ===
Event	Gold	Silver	Bronze
Pinweight; 46 kg	Khushi Chand; India	Luo Jinxiu; China	Altangadasyn Altanzul; Mongolia
Pinweight; 46 kg	Khushi Chand; India	Luo Jinxiu; China	Chen Fang-yu; Chinese Taipei
Flyweight; 50 kg	Ahaana Sharma; India	Ma Jong-hyang; North Korea	Nazokat Mardonova; Uzbekistan
Flyweight; 50 kg	Ahaana Sharma; India	Ma Jong-hyang; North Korea	Cui Xinying; China
Bantamweight; 54 kg	Chandrika Pujari; India	Kumriniso Muhammadova; Uzbekistan	Azjargalyn Aminaa; Mongolia
Bantamweight; 54 kg	Chandrika Pujari; India	Kumriniso Muhammadova; Uzbekistan	Ramina Makhanova; Kazakhstan
Lightweight; 60 kg	Rushanabonu Isoeva; Uzbekistan	Miki Miura; Japan	Furugh Sarhadzoda; Tajikistan
Lightweight; 60 kg	Rushanabonu Isoeva; Uzbekistan	Miki Miura; Japan	Wang Jingjing; China
Welterweight; 66 kg	Ayaulym Ospanova; Kazakhstan	Harnoor Kaur; India	Lu Wen-jing; Chinese Taipei
Welterweight; 66 kg	Ayaulym Ospanova; Kazakhstan	Harnoor Kaur; India	Ulbosin Djalgasbaeva; Uzbekistan
Middleweight; 75 kg	Kamila Ospanova; Kazakhstan	Samira Turgunova; Uzbekistan	Yekta Sahraei; Iran
Middleweight; 75 kg	Kamila Ospanova; Kazakhstan	Samira Turgunova; Uzbekistan	Zheng Shan; China
Heavyweight +80 kg	Anshika; India	Elnura Kongyrat; Kazakhstan	Fatemeh Rastegar; Iran
Heavyweight +80 kg	Anshika; India	Elnura Kongyrat; Kazakhstan	Guo Jiaqing; China

== Medal table ==
Rank	Nation	Gold	Silver	Bronze	Total
1	Kazakhstan (KAZ)	5	3	2	10
1	Uzbekistan (UZB)	5	3	2	10
3	India (IND)	4	2	1	7
4	Iran (IRI)	0	2	4	6
5	China (CHN)	0	1	6	7
6	Japan (JPN)	0	1	2	3
7	North Korea (PRK)	0	1	1	2
8	Kyrgyzstan (KGZ)	0	1	0	1
9	Tajikistan (TJK)	0	0	3	3
10	Chinese Taipei (TPE)	0	0	2	2
10	Mongolia (MGL)	0	0	2	2
12	Iraq (IRQ)	0	0	1	1
12	Jordan (JOR)	0	0	1	1
12	Philippines (PHI)	0	0	1	1
Totals (14 entries)		14	14	28	56

== Results ==
=== Boys ===
==== 46 kg ====
Round of 16; 24 October
Hsu Chung-wei (TPE)	0
Binul Dulnada Dewasiri (SRI)	5
Leo Mhar Lobrido (PHI)	5
Salte Al-Hadidi (JOR)	0
Hussein Al-Suraihi (YEM)	0
Abdyrahym Öwezgulyýew (TKM)	5
Abdugani Yorkinjonov (UZB)	RSC
Lee Chang-wook (KOR)
Damir Nazarov (TJK)	RSC
Yousif Ali Eissa (UAE)
Riyad Ahmed (BAN)	RSC
Abdulla Al-Mohanadi (QAT)
Zhang Zhekai (CHN)
Arman Myrsabit (KAZ)	RSC
Dhruv Kharb (IND)	4
Alinur Bakytbekov (KGZ)	1

Quarterfinals; 26 October
Binul Dulnada Dewasiri (SRI)	0
Leo Mhar Lobrido (PHI)	5
Abdyrahym Öwezgulyýew (TKM)	0
Abdugani Yorkinjonov (UZB)	5
Damir Nazarov (TJK)	RSC
Riyad Ahmed (BAN)
Arman Myrsabit (KAZ)	5
Dhruv Kharb (IND)	0

Semifinals; 28 October
Leo Mhar Lobrido (PHI)	0
Abdugani Yorkinjonov (UZB)	5
Damir Nazarov (TJK)	0
Arman Myrsabit (KAZ)	5

Gold medal 30 October
Abdugani Yorkinjonov (UZB)	3
Arman Myrsabit (KAZ)	2

==== 50 kg ====
Round of 32 – 23 October
Imanbek Abdiraiimov (KGZ)	0–5	Jiang Qiancheng (CHN)
Mohammed Al-Marri (QAT)	3–2	Ali Al-Askari (KSA)
Habibulla Saynazarov (UZB)	2–3	Behruz Umarov (TJK)
Ali Asadullah (BAN)	2–3	Janindu Dhananjaya (SRI)
Batkhuyagiin Agarzandan (MGL)	1–4	Ybragim Iskanderow (TKM)
Ashriq Ryan (MAS)	4–1	Huzaifa Raheel (PAK)
Kira Hasegawa (JPN)	4–1	Osama Al-Khaldi (JOR)

Round of 16; 25 October
Lanchenba Singh (IND)	4
Jefferson Amaya (PHI)	1
Awsan Yaseen Ali (YEM)	2
Thitiphan Khamrae (THA)	3
Wu Cheng-you (TPE)
An Phyong-guk (PRK)	RSC
Al-Mohaimen Ali (IRQ)	0
Pema Namdel (BHU)	5
Zhumagali Nurmakhan (KAZ)	5
Jiang Qiancheng (CHN)	0
Mohammed Al-Marri (QAT)
Behruz Umarov (TJK)	RSC
Janindu Dhananjaya (SRI)	0
Ybragim Iskanderow (TKM)	5
Ashriq Ryan (MAS)	0
Kira Hasegawa (JPN)	5

Quarterfinals; 27 October
Lanchenba Singh (IND)	4
Thitiphan Khamrae (THA)	1
An Phyong-guk (PRK)	5
Pema Namdel (BHU)	0
Zhumagali Nurmakhan (KAZ)	4
Behruz Umarov (TJK)	1
Ybragim Iskanderow (TKM)	0
Kira Hasegawa (JPN)	5

Semifinals; 28 October
Lanchenba Singh (IND)	5
An Phyong-guk (PRK)	0
Zhumagali Nurmakhan (KAZ)	4
Kira Hasegawa (JPN)	1

Gold medal 30 October
Lanchenba Singh (IND)	0
Zhumagali Nurmakhan (KAZ)	5

==== 54 kg ====
Round of 32 – 23 October
Abdyresul Arslanow (TKM)	3–2	Farhad Salangi (AFG)
Matin Chamipa (IRI)	5–0	Usmonjon Boronov (TJK)
Ali Al-Mesmari (UAE)	0–5	Jayyad Hussain (PAK)
Omran Imtair (PLE)	0–5	Lee Jun-hui (KOR)

Round of 16; 25 October
John Michael Estorba (PHI)	0
Doszhan Zhumakan (KAZ)	5
Bekhruzjon Rakhataliyev (UZB)	3
Wang Zihan (CHN)	2
Nursultan Duishonaliev (KGZ)	0
Ryusei Kitamura (JPN)	5
Non Fakthongyu (THA)	0
Udham Singh Raghav (IND)	5
Motaz Al-Mashaleh (JOR)	RSC
Sulaiman Al-Salhi (KSA)
Ramzi Hilal (LBN)	5
Adam Ng (MAS)	0
Abdyresul Arslanow (TKM)	1
Matin Chamipa (IRI)	4
Jayyad Hussain (PAK)
Lee Jun-hui (KOR)	RSC

Quarterfinals; 27 October
Doszhan Zhumakan (KAZ)	3
Bekhruzjon Rakhataliyev (UZB)	2
Ryusei Kitamura (JPN)	3
Udham Singh Raghav (IND)	1
Motaz Al-Mashaleh (JOR)	RSC
Ramzi Hilal (LBN)
Matin Chamipa (IRI)	5
Lee Jun-hui (KOR)	0

Semifinals; 28 October
Doszhan Zhumakan (KAZ)	4
Ryusei Kitamura (JPN)	1
Motaz Al-Mashaleh (JOR)	0
Matin Chamipa (IRI)	5

Gold medal 30 October
Doszhan Zhumakan (KAZ)	3
Matin Chamipa (IRI)	2

==== 60 kg ====
Round of 32 – 23 October
Siwa Chainarong (THA)	2–3	Zhang Zhengkun (CHN)
Atef Al-Shareef (PLE)	0–5	Möngönkhölögiin Tselmeg (MGL)
Amir Ali Mehrabi (IRI)	5–0	Sahil Duhan (IND)
Azizbek Farhadow (TKM)	0–5	Kenshin Sakuno (JPN)

Round of 16; 25 October
Abbas Hayder (IRQ)	RSC
Fahad Al-Dosari (QAT)
Zubair Akramov (KGZ)	5
Sani Ahmed Bapari (BAN)	0
Ayham Hmaidan (KSA)
Abubakr Azizov (TJK)	RSC
Phanitharn Chian (MAS)	1
Abdulrahman Al-Mudhahki (BRN)	4
Wesam Wahidi (JOR)	0
Ibrokhim Shokirjonov (UZB)	5
Suhrab Zamani (AFG)	0
Emir Mukhit (KAZ)	5
Zhang Zhengkun (CHN)	5
Möngönkhölögiin Tselmeg (MGL)	0
Amir Ali Mehrabi (IRI)	1
Kenshin Sakuno (JPN)	4

Quarterfinals; 27 October
Abbas Hayder (IRQ)
Zubair Akramov (KGZ)	RSC
Abubakr Azizov (TJK)	5
Abdulrahman Al-Mudhahki (BRN)	0
Ibrokhim Shokirjonov (UZB)	5
Emir Mukhit (KAZ)	0
Zhang Zhengkun (CHN)	5
Kenshin Sakuno (JPN)	0

Semifinals; 28 October
Zubair Akramov (KGZ)	RSCI
Abubakr Azizov (TJK)
Ibrokhim Shokirjonov (UZB)	3
Zhang Zhengkun (CHN)	2

Gold medal 30 October
Zubair Akramov (KGZ)	0
Ibrokhim Shokirjonov (UZB)	5

==== 66 kg ====
Round of 16; 25 October
Santi Kaewboonraung (THA)	5
Sajjad Hayder (IRQ)	0
Umarjon Asrorov (TJK)	0
Anant Deshmukh (IND)	5
Noyon Tripura Jani (BAN)	2
Toýly Bazarow (TKM)	3
Aziretkhan Mairanbekov (KGZ)	0
Farzan Ahmadi (IRI)	5
Kunimitsu Honjo (JPN)	0
Abdallah Toghoz (JOR)	5
Saidkhuja Sadillakhujaev (UZB)	5
Kadierding Abudujieli (CHN)	0

Quarterfinals; 27 October
Yousef Al-Nabulsi (UAE)	0
Daniyal Shalkarbay (KAZ)	5
Santi Kaewboonraung (THA)
Anant Deshmukh (IND)	RSC
Toýly Bazarow (TKM)	0
Farzan Ahmadi (IRI)	5
Abdallah Toghoz (JOR)	0
Saidkhuja Sadillakhujaev (UZB)	5

Semifinals; 28 October
Daniyal Shalkarbay (KAZ)	5
Anant Deshmukh (IND)	0
Farzan Ahmadi (IRI)	1
Saidkhuja Sadillakhujaev (UZB)	4

Gold medal 30 October
Daniyal Shalkarbay (KAZ)	5
Saidkhuja Sadillakhujaev (UZB)	0

==== 75 kg ====
Round of 16; 23 October
Diyorbek Murodilloev (UZB)	5
Moaaz Wael Mohamed (UAE)	0
Mohamed Attia (BRN)	0
Guan Yiwen (CHN)	5
Devendra Chaudhary (IND)	5
Yusuf Kandil (KSA)	0
Mehrshad Sherafatmand (IRI)	RSC
Ulan Mairambekov (KGZ)
Yazeed Jaradat (JOR)	0
Amir Nozimov (TJK)	3

Quarterfinals; 27 October
Sanzhar Matassov (KAZ)	5
Tabish Sediqi (AFG)	0
Justin James Zampatti (PHI)
Diyorbek Murodilloev (UZB)	RSC
Guan Yiwen (CHN)	5
Devendra Chaudhary (IND)	0
Mehrshad Sherafatmand (IRI)	4
Amir Nozimov (TJK)	0

Semifinals; 28 October
Sanzhar Matassov (KAZ)	0
Diyorbek Murodilloev (UZB)	5
Guan Yiwen (CHN)	0
Mehrshad Sherafatmand (IRI)	5

Gold medal 30 October
Diyorbek Murodilloev (UZB)	5
Mehrshad Sherafatmand (IRI)	0

==== +80 kg ====
Round of 16; 24 October
Asadbek Sultanboev (UZB)	RSC
Rahul (IND)
Ma Duoli (CHN)	5
Nguyễn Trọng Tiến (VIE)	0
Abdumalik Lerov (KGZ)	RSC
Rani Charanek (LBN)
Zayed Al-Shebli (UAE)
Zuber Salih (IRQ)	RSC

Quarterfinals; 27 October
Farhoud Ghorbani (IRI)	RSCI
Mukhammadali Burkhonov (TJK)
Omar Issa (JOR)	0
Mukhamedali Rustembek (KAZ)	5
Asadbek Sultanboev (UZB)	WO
Ma Duoli (CHN)
Abdumalik Lerov (KGZ)	0
Zuber Salih (IRQ)	5

Semifinals; 28 October
Farhoud Ghorbani (IRI)	0
Mukhamedali Rustembek (KAZ)	5
Asadbek Sultanboev (UZB)	ABD
Zuber Salih (IRQ)

Gold medal 30 October
Mukhamedali Rustembek (KAZ)	0
Asadbek Sultanboev (UZB)	5

=== Girls ===
==== 46 kg ====
Round of 16; 24 October
Reem Al-Ramahi (JOR)	0
Khushi Chand (IND)	5
Luo Jinxiu (CHN)	5
Warisara Tenglong (THA)	0
Shugyla Zharas (KAZ)	5
Firuza Fozilova (TJK)	0
Chen Fang-yu (TPE)	5
Nguyễn Thị Hồng Yến (VIE)	0
Rukhshonabonu Ahadova (UZB)	2
Shairylle Pores (PHI)	3

Quarterfinals; 26 October
Matsuri Kamemori (JPN)	0
Altangadasyn Altanzul (MGL)	5
Wareef Al-Shehri (KSA)
Khushi Chand (IND)	RSC
Luo Jinxiu (CHN)	5
Shugyla Zharas (KAZ)	0
Chen Fang-yu (TPE)	5
Shairylle Pores (PHI)	0

Semifinals; 28 October
Altangadasyn Altanzul (MGL)	0
Khushi Chand (IND)	5
Luo Jinxiu (CHN)	5
Chen Fang-yu (TPE)	0

Gold medal 30 October
Khushi Chand (IND)	4
Luo Jinxiu (CHN)	1

==== 50 kg ====
Round of 16; 24 October
Runa Ito (JPN)	0
Nazokat Mardonova (UZB)	5
Akmaral Amantaieva (KGZ)
Ahaana Sharma (IND)	RSC
Sangay Peldon (BHU)	3
Jana Muhanna (KSA)	2
Sokaina Haidari (AFG)	0
Đinh Thị Ru Na (VIE)	5
Cui Xinying (CHN)	3
Ermalie Caballero (PHI)	2
Ma Jong-hyang (PRK)	RSC
Heo Jeong-yoon (KOR)
Tala Hussein (JOR)	5
Kuo Chih-yen (TPE)	0

Quarterfinals; 26 October
Maral Tolepbergen (KAZ)	0
Nazokat Mardonova (UZB)	5
Ahaana Sharma (IND)	RSC
Sangay Peldon (BHU)
Đinh Thị Ru Na (VIE)	0
Cui Xinying (CHN)	5
Ma Jong-hyang (PRK)	5
Tala Hussein (JOR)	0

Semifinals; 28 October
Nazokat Mardonova (UZB)	2
Ahaana Sharma (IND)	3
Cui Xinying (CHN)	0
Ma Jong-hyang (PRK)	5

Gold medal 30 October
Ahaana Sharma (IND)	RSC
Ma Jong-hyang (PRK)

==== 54 kg ====
Round of 16; 24 October
Julia Sheikh (JOR)	0
Wu Chieh-ju (TPE)	5
Shirin Tursalieva (KGZ)	0
Yui Hatakeyama (JPN)	5
Choi Ji-you (KOR)
Chandrika Pujari (IND)	RSC
Rim Hyang (PRK)	0
Ramina Makhanova (KAZ)	5
Nazanin Davoudi (IRI)	0
Wang Yaorunyu (CHN)	5

Quarterfinals; 26 October
Rujira Sriphonthong (THA)	2
Azjargalyn Aminaa (MGL)	3
Kumriniso Muhammadova (UZB)	5
Wu Chieh-ju (TPE)	0
Yui Hatakeyama (JPN)	0
Chandrika Pujari (IND)	5
Ramina Makhanova (KAZ)	5
Wang Yaorunyu (CHN)	0

Semifinals; 28 October
Azjargalyn Aminaa (MGL)	1
Kumriniso Muhammadova (UZB)	4
Chandrika Pujari (IND)	5
Ramina Makhanova (KAZ)	0

Gold medal 30 October
Kumriniso Muhammadova (UZB)	0
Chandrika Pujari (IND)	5

==== 60 kg ====
Quarterfinals; 26 October
Wang Jingjing (CHN)	3
Harsika (IND)	2
Indira Kydyrmoldayeva (KAZ)
Rushanabonu Isoeva (UZB)	RSC

Semifinals; 28 October
Furugh Sarhadzoda (TJK)	1
Miki Miura (JPN)	4
Wang Jingjing (CHN)
Rushanabonu Isoeva (UZB)	WO

Gold medal 30 October
Miki Miura (JPN)
Rushanabonu Isoeva (UZB)	RSC

==== 66 kg ====
Quarterfinals; 26 October
Lu Wen-jing (TPE)	3
Zeng Tianyi (CHN)	0
Nannaphat Mungpingklang (THA)	0
Ulbosin Djalgasbaeva (UZB)	5
Ayaulym Ospanova (KAZ)	RSC
Zhasmina Mamaraimova (TJK)

Semifinals; 28 October
Harnoor Kaur (IND)	5
Lu Wen-jing (TPE)	0
Ulbosin Djalgasbaeva (UZB)	0
Ayaulym Ospanova (KAZ)	5

Gold medal 30 October
Harnoor Kaur (IND)
Ayaulym Ospanova (KAZ)	RSC

==== 75 kg ====
Quarterfinals; 26 October
Zheng Shan (CHN)	3
Shivani Toor (IND)	2

Semifinals; 28 October
Samira Turgunova (UZB)	5
Yekta Sahraei (IRI)	0
Kamila Ospanova (KAZ)	5
Zheng Shan (CHN)	0

Gold medal 30 October
Samira Turgunova (UZB)	0
Kamila Ospanova (KAZ)	5

==== +80 kg ====
Quarterfinals; 26 October
Anshika (IND)	3
Mavjuda Abdusaidova (UZB)	2

Semifinals; 28 October
Elnura Kongyrat (KAZ)	RSC
Fatemeh Rastegar (IRI)
Guo Jiaqing (CHN)	0
Anshika (IND)	5

Gold medal 30 October
Elnura Kongyrat (KAZ)	0
Anshika (IND)	5
