= India at the 2025 Asian Youth Games =

- IOC code: IND
- NOC: Indian Olympic Association
- Website: olympic.ind.in

in Manama, Bahrain 22 October 2025 – 31 October 2025
- Competitors: 222 (103 boys and 119 girls) in 21 sports
- Medals Ranked 6th: Gold 13 Silver 18 Bronze 17 Total 48

Asian Youth Games appearances (overview)
- 2009; 2013; 2025

The Republic of India is competing at the 2025 Asian Youth Games in Manama, Bahrain, from 22 to 31 October 2025. This is India's second appearance in the competition since the 2009 edition, after they previously competed as Independent Olympic Athletes in the 2013 edition.

== Background ==
India was one of the first five founding members of the Asian Games Federation (now Olympic Council of Asia) on 13 February 1949, in New Delhi. The nation made its appearance in every edition of the Asian Youth Games (AYG) since 2009, however the Indian athletes had to participate in the Games under the Olympic flag due to the suspension of the country's National Olympic Committee (NOC) in the 2013 edition. This edition marked the nation's second appearance at the Games.

The Indian contingent for this year's games consists of 222 athletes across 21 sports disciplines, in addition to 90 support staff and officials. Yogeshwar Dutt has been appointed as the Chef de mission, aka head of mission for this edition.

== Medalists ==
Medal	Name	Sport	Event	Date
(gold) Gold	National girls' kabaddi team: Akshita Devanda; Arpita; Bhumika Diksha Karthika Ramesh; Khushi; Komal; Krishna; Lakshita Gurjar; Nikita; Nikita Devanda; Preeti Thakur; Priyanka Padhan; Serena Mhaskar	Kabaddi	Girls' team	23 October
(gold) Gold	National boys' kabaddi team: Abinesh Mohandass; Aditya; Akash; Akhil; Anuj Chaudhary; Aryan; Harish Gadde; Harsh; Ishant; Keshav; Prasad Dighole; Rahul Singh Bohra; Sachin Chaudhary; Shubham	Kabaddi	Boys' team	23 October
(gold) Gold	Priteesmita Bhoi	Weightlifting	Girls' –44 kg (Clean & Jerk)	26 October
(gold) Gold	Yashita Rana	Wrestling	Girls' –61 kg (Freestyle)	28 October
(gold) Gold	Jaiveer Singh	Wrestling	Boys' –55 kg (Freestyle)	29 October
(gold) Gold	Moni	Wrestling	Girls' –57 kg (Freestyle)	29 October
(gold) Gold	Khushi Chand	Boxing	Girls' –46 kg	30 October
(gold) Gold	Ahaana Sharma	Boxing	Girls' –50 kg	30 October
(gold) Gold	Chandrika Pujari	Boxing	Girls' –54 kg	30 October
(gold) Gold	Anshika	Boxing	Girls' +80 kg	30 October
(gold) Gold	Sani Fulmali	Beach wrestling	Boys' –60 kg	30 October
(gold) Gold	Ruhil Arjun	Beach wrestling	Boys' 90 kg	30 October
(gold) Gold	Anjali	Beach wrestling	Girls' 55 kg	30 October
(silver) Silver	Kanishka Bidhuri	Kurash	Girls' –52 kg	20 October
(silver) Silver	Ranjana Yadav	Athletics	Girls' 5000m walk	23 October
(silver) Silver	Shourya Ambure	Athletics	Girls' 100m hurdles	23 October
(silver) Silver	Oshin	Athletics	Girls' discus throw	24 October
(silver) Silver	Edwina Jason	Athletics	Girls' 400m	24 October
(silver) Silver	Shriya Satam	Mixed martial arts	Girls' 60 kg	25 October
(silver) Silver	Priteesmita Bhoi	Weightlifting	Girls' –44 kg (Snatch)	26 October
(silver) Silver	Bhumika Nehate; Edwina Jason; Shourya Ambure; Tannu	Athletics	Girls' medley relay	26 October
(silver) Silver	Arumugapandian Maharajan	Weightlifting	Boys' –60 kg (Snatch)	26 October
(silver) Silver	Arumugapandian Maharajan	Weightlifting	Boys' –60 kg (Clean & Jerk)	26 October
(silver) Silver	Gourav Punia	Wrestling	Boys' –65 kg (Freestyle)	29 October
(silver) Silver	Ashvini Vishnoi	Wrestling	Girls' –69 kg (Freestyle)	29 October
(silver) Silver	Lanchenba Singh Moibungkhongbam	Boxing	Boys' –50 kg	30 October
(silver) Silver	Harnoor Kaur	Boxing	Girls' –66 kg	30 October
(bronze) Bronze	Jasmine Kaur	Athletics	Girls' Shot Put	23 October
(bronze) Bronze	Khushi	Kurash	Girls' 70 kg	19 October
(bronze) Bronze	Arvind	Kurash	Boys' 83 kg	20 October
(bronze) Bronze	Debasish Das	Taekwondo	Boys' recognised poomsae	23 October
(bronze) Bronze	Yashwini Singh; Shivanshu Patel	Taekwondo	Mixed recognised poomsae	23 October
(bronze) Bronze	Palash Mandal	Athletics	Boys' 5000m walk	24 October
(bronze) Bronze	Veer Bhadu	Mixed martial arts	Boys' 80 kg	24 October
(bronze) Bronze	Zubin Gohain	Athletics	Boys' high jump	24 October
(bronze) Bronze	Bhumika Nehate	Athletics	Girls' 200m	25 October
(bronze) Bronze	Alphonsa Wriang	Muaythai	Girls' Wai Kru 16–17	26 October
(bronze) Bronze	Dhanashree Pawar; Gharluxmi Phurailaptam; Hardik Ahlawat; Nihal Dewali	Taekwondo	Mixed Team	26 October
(bronze) Bronze	Syndrela Das; Sarthak Arya	Table tennis	Mixed Doubles	28 October
(bronze) Bronze	Anant Deshmukh	Boxing	Boys' –66 kg	28 October
(bronze) Bronze	Rachana	Wrestling	Girls' –43 kg (Freestyle)	29 October
(bronze) Bronze	Komal Verma	Wrestling	Girls' –49 kg (Freestyle)	29 October

=== Summary ===
Medals by events
Sport	Gold	Silver	Bronze	Total
Boxing	4	2	1	7
Wrestling	3	2	2	7
Beach wrestling	3	2	0	5
Kabaddi	2	0	0	2
Weightlifting	1	3	1	5
Athletics	0	5	4	9
Kurash	0	1	2	3
Mixed martial arts	0	1	1	2
Taekwondo	0	0	3	3
Muaythai	0	0	1	1
Table tennis	0	0	1	1
Total	10	13	15	38

Medals by day
Day	Date	Gold	Silver	Bronze	Total
-3	19 October	0	0	1	1
-2	20 October	0	1	1	2
+1	23 October	2	2	3	7
+2	24 October	0	2	3	5
+3	25 October	0	1	1	2
+4	26 October	1	4	2	7
+6	28 October	1	0	1	2
+7	29 October	2	2	2	6
+8	30 October	7	6	3	16
Total		13	18	17	48

Medals by gender
Gender	Gold	Silver	Bronze	Total
Female	7	9	6	22
Male	3	4	6	13
Mixed	0	0	3	3
Total	10	13	15	38

Multiple medalists
Name	Event	1st place, gold medalist(s)	2nd place, silver medalist(s)	3rd place, bronze medalist(s)	Total
Preetismita Bhoi	Weightlifting	1	1	0	2
Shourya Ambure	Athletics	0	2	0	2
Edwina Jason	Athletics	0	2	0	2
Arumugapandian; Maharajan	Weightlifting	0	2	0	2
Bhumika Nehate	Athletics	0	1	1	2

== 3x3 basketball ==
India fielded its girls' team for the 3x3 basketball competition.

Squad	Event	Group Stage							Quarter-finals	Semi-finals	Final / BM	
Squad	Event	Opposition Score	Opposition Score	Opposition Score	Opposition Score	Opposition Score	Opposition Score	Rank	Opposition Score	Opposition Score	Opposition Score	Rank
Mahek Sharma; Nethra Birudavolu; Reva Kulkarni; Viha Jonnalagadda	Girls' team	Sri Lanka; W 21–6	Maldives; W 21–14	Palestine; W 21–6	Mongolia; W 21–15	Indonesia; W 18–15	Thailand; L 9–15	2Q	Iran; L 10–15	Did not advance to next round		

== Athletics ==
=== Road and Track events ===
Boys

Athlete	Event	Heat		Semifinal		Final	
Athlete	Event	Result	Rank	Result	Rank	Result	Rank
Divyansh Raj	100m	11.01	3Q	11.11	8	Did not advance	
Nihal Kamal	100m	11.16	5q	12.63	8	Did not advance	
Ramu Lodenga	200m	22.47 PB	4	Did not advance to next round			
Ramu Lodenga	400m	49.62 ~~PB~~	3Q	—N/a		49.51 PB	5
Palash Mandal	5000m Walk	—N/a				24:48.92	3rd place, bronze medalist(s)
Divyansh Raj; Neil Rathanam; Nihal Kamal; Ramu Lodenga	Medley Relay	—N/a				1:59.96	5

Girls

Athlete	Event	Heat		Semifinal		Final	
Athlete	Event	Result	Rank	Result	Rank	Result	Rank
Bhumika Nehate	200m	25.07	1Q	—N/a		24.43 PB	3rd place, bronze medalist(s)
Edwina Jason	400m	55.71 ~~PB~~	1Q	—N/a		55.43 PB	2nd place, silver medalist(s)
Tannu	400m	57.54	3Q	—N/a		58.49	8
Shourya Ambure	100m Hurdles	14.00 ~~PB~~	2Q	—N/a		13.73 PB	2nd place, silver medalist(s)
Ranjana Yadav	5000m Walk	—N/a				24:25.88	2nd place, silver medalist(s)
Riya Rathore	5000m Walk	—N/a				26:44.34	4
Bhumika Nehate; Edwina Jason; Shourya Ambure; Tannu	Medley Relay	—N/a		2:12.00	2Q	2:09.65	2nd place, silver medalist(s)

=== Field events ===
Boys

Athlete	Event	Qualification		Final	
Athlete	Event	Result	Rank	Result	Rank
Swapnil Dutta	Discus Throw	—N/a		51.53 PB	6
Himanshu Singh	High Jump	—N/a		2.03 PB	4
Zubin Gohain	High Jump	—N/a		2.03 PB	3rd place, bronze medalist(s)
Prince	Javelin Throw	—N/a		61.92	4
Pradeep Kumar	Long Jump	—N/a		6.45	11
Ravi	Shot Put	—N/a		16.23 PB	4

Girls

Athlete	Event	Qualification		Final	
Athlete	Event	Result	Rank	Result	Rank
Oshin	Discus Throw	—N/a		43.38 PB	2nd place, silver medalist(s)
Yashvitha Potanapalli	High Jump	—N/a		1.50	10
Misti Karmakar	Javelin Throw	—N/a		42.05	8
Siya Banjara	Javelin Throw	—N/a		42.32 PB	7
Jyoti Jangid	Long Jump	—N/a		5.34	10
Obami Murmu	Long Jump	—N/a		5.33	11
Jasmine Kaur	Shot Put	—N/a		14.86	3rd place, bronze medalist(s)
Joy Baidwan	Shot Put	—N/a		14.53	6

== Badminton ==
Singles

Athlete	Event	Round of 32	Round of 16	Quarterfinals	Semifinals	Final	
Athlete	Event	Opposition Score	Opposition Score	Opposition Score	Opposition Score	Opposition Score	Rank
Tankara Talasila (8)	Boys	Tee (SGP); W 2–0	Dosano (PHI); W 2–0	Xu (CHN); L 1–2	Did not advance to next round		
Suryaksh Rawat (4)	Boys	Raj (BAN); W 2–0	Huang (TPE); W 2–0	Luo (CHN); L 0–2	Did not advance to next round		
Vennala Kalagotla (7)	Girls	Ratnayake (SRI); W 2–0	Bejasa (PHI); W 2–0	Phichitpreechasak (THA); L 0–2	Did not advance to next round		

Doubles

Athlete	Event	Round of 32	Round of 16	Quarterfinals	Semifinals	Final	
Athlete	Event	Opposition Score	Opposition Score	Opposition Score	Opposition Score	Opposition Score	Rank
Aanya Bisht; Param Choudhary (5)	Mixed	Kim / Na (KOR); L 0–2	Did not advance to next round				
Angel Punera; Bjorn Jaison (2)	Mixed	Malyneth / William (CAM); W 2–0	Ramos / Calderson (PHI); W 2–0	Pramono / Candani (INA); L 1–2	Did not advance to next round		

== Beach Wrestling ==
Wrestler	Event	Qualifying Round	Group Stage				Semi-Finals	Final / BM	
Wrestler	Event	Opposition Score	Opposition Score	Opposition Score	Opposition Score	Rank	Opposition Score	Opposition Score	Rank
Anjali	Girls' –55 kg	—N/a	Duangchit (THA); W 2–0	Qawasmi (JOR); W 2–0	—N/a	1Q	Olaso (PHI); W 2–0	Bùi (VIE); W 2–1	1st place, gold medalist(s)
Sani Fulmali	Boys' –60 kg	Kil (KOR); W 2–1	Alsaud (KSA); W 2–0	Lam (VIE); W 2–0	Angana (PHI); W 4–0	1Q	Bayarsaikhan (MGL); W 4–0	Domirkolaei (IRI); W 2–0	1st place, gold medalist(s)
Sujay Tanpure	Boys' –70 kg	Chorawek (THA); W 2–0	Go (KOR); W 4–0	Ali (PAK); W 2–1	Marafi (JOR); W 2–0	1Q	Bakhromov (TJK); W 2–0	Shokouhi (IRI); L 1–2	2nd place, silver medalist(s)
Ravinder	Boys' –80 kg	—N/a	Kim (KOR); W 2–1	Majrashi (KSA); W 2–1	Rehman (PAK); W 2–1	1Q	Naghouj (JOR); W 2–0	Khodaei (IRI); L 1–2	2nd place, silver medalist(s)
Arjun Ruhil	Boys' –90 kg	—N/a	Saeed (KSA); W 2–0	Zaman (BHR); W 4–0	Soprakhon (THA); W 2–1	1Q	Pham (VIE); W 4–1	Fotouhi (IRI); W 2–1	1st place, gold medalist(s)

== Boxing ==
The Boxing Federation of India announced the 23-member squad (14 athletes and 9 support-staff officials) for the Asian Youth Games.

Boys

Athlete	Event	Round of 32	Round of 16	Quarterfinals	Semifinals	Final	
Athlete	Event	Opposition Score	Opposition Score	Opposition Score	Opposition Score	Opposition Score	Rank
Dhruv Kharb	46 kg	—N/a	Bakytbekov (KGZ); W 4-1^{WBP}	Myrsabit (KAZ); L 0–5^{LBP}	Did not advance to next round		
Lanchenba Moibungkhongbam	50 kg	—N/a	Amaya (PHI); W 4-1^{WBP}	Khamrae (THA); W 4-1^{WBP}	An (PRK); W 5–0^{WBP}	Nurmakhan (KAZ); L 0–5^{LBP}	2nd place, silver medalist(s)
Raghav Udham Singh	54 kg	—N/a	Fakthongyu (THA); W 5–0^{WBP}	Kitamura (JPN); L 1–3^{LBP}	Did not advance to next round		
Sahil Duhan	60 kg	Mehrabi (IRI); L 0–5^{LBP}	Did not advance to next round				
Anant Deshmukh	66 kg	—N/a	Asrorov (TJK); W 5–0^{WBP}	Kaewboonraung (THA); W RSC	Shalkarbay (KAZ); L 0–5^{LBP}	Did not advance	3rd place, bronze medalist(s)
Devendra Chaudhary	75 kg	—N/a	Kandil (KSA); W 5–0^{WBP}	Guan (CHN); L 0–5^{LBP}	Did not advance to next round		
Rahul	+80 kg	—N/a	Sultanboev (UZB); L RSC	Did not advance to next round			

Girls

Athlete	Event	Round of 16	Quarterfinals	Semifinals	Final	
Athlete	Event	Opposition Score	Opposition Score	Opposition Score	Opposition Score	Rank
Khushi Chand	46 kg	Al-Ramahi (JOR); W 5–0^{WBP}	Alshehri (KSA); W RSC	Altangadas (MGL); W 5–0^{WBP}	Luo (CHN); W 4–1^{WBP}	1st place, gold medalist(s)
Ahaana Sharma	50 kg	Amantaieva (KGZ); W RSC	Peldon (BHU); W RSC	Mardonova (UZB); W 3-2^{WBP}	Ma (PRK); W RSC	1st place, gold medalist(s)
Chandrika Pujari	54 kg	Choi (KOR); W RSC	Hatakeyama (JPN); W 5–0^{WBP}	Makhanova (KAZ); W 5–0^{WBP}	Muhammadova (UZB); W 5–0^{WBP}	1st place, gold medalist(s)
Harsika	60 kg	—N/a	Wang (CHN); L 2–3^{LBP}	Did not advance to next round		
Harnoor Kaur	66 kg	—N/a		Lu (TPE); W 5–0^{WBP}	Ospanova (KAZ); 30 October; 17:30 IST	
Shivani Toor	75 kg	—N/a	Zheng (CHN); L 2–3^{LBP}	Did not advance to next round		
Anshika	+80 kg	—N/a	Abdusaidova (UZB); W 3–2^{WBP}	Guo (CHN); W 5-0^{WBP}	Kongyrat (KAZ); 30 October; 17:30 IST	

== Camel racing ==
Athlete	Event	Final	
Athlete	Event	Time	Rank
Hitendra Singh	Boys' 500m Sprint	1:08	13
Rishab Kadam	Boys' 500m Sprint	1:02	9

== Cycling ==
Road race

Athlete	Event	Final	
Athlete	Event	Time	Rank
Aditya Jakhar	Boys	2:24:24	27
Alok Bishnoi	Boys	2:36:57	52
Lokesh Choudhary	Boys	2:24:24	29
Sunny	Boys	2:24:31	33
Anjali Jakhar	Girls	1:59:49	35
Nikita Shinde	Girls	1:49:49	34
Prajakta Suryawanshi	Girls	1:59:44	32
Rukhamani	Girls	2:00:01	38

Time trial

Athlete	Event	Final	
Athlete	Event	Time	Rank
Aditya Jakhar	Boys' Individual	22:41.54	6
Anjali Jakhar	Girls' Individual	17:43.89	4
Alok Bishnoi; Lokesh Choudhary; Aditya Jakhar; Anjali Jakhar; Nikita Shinde; Prajakta Suryawanshi	Mixed Team; Relay	49:06.86	6

== Golf ==
Athlete	Event	Round 1	Round 2	Round 3	Total		
Athlete	Event	Score	Score	Score	Score	Par	Rank
Ribhav Verma	Boys' Singles	75	74	77	226	+5	T23
Mannatpreet Brar	Girls' Singles	66	74	70	210	–6	13
Saanvi Somu	Girls' Singles	73	72	70	215	–1	16
Zara Anand	Girls' Singles	70	70	74	214	–2	15
Mannatpreet Brar; Saanvi Somu; Zara Anand	Girls' Doubles	136	142	140	418	–14	4

Legend: T = Tied

== Handball ==
Event	Group Stage							Semifinals	Final	
Event	Opposition Score	Opposition Score	Opposition Score	Opposition Score	Opposition Score	Opposition Score	Rank	Opposition Score	Opposition Score	Rank
Girls' team	Uzbekistan; L 26-39	Kazakhstan; L 26-39	Thailand; D 26-26	Hong Kong; W 33-17	Iran; L 26-43	China; 30 October				

== Judo ==
Boys

Athlete	Event	Round of 16	Quarterfinals	Semifinals	Repechage	Final / BMM	
Athlete	Event	Opposition Score	Opposition Score	Opposition Score	Opposition Score	Opposition Score	Rank
Harsimar Kang	–50 kg	Kao (TPE); W 100–000^{IPP}	Usmonov (UZB); L 000–101^{IPP}	—N/a	Wu (CHN); W 101–000^{IPP}	Mohammed (YEM); L 000–012^{WAZ}	5
Niketan Moirangthem	–55 kg	Rafiq (MAS); L 001–010	Did not advance to next round				
Nitin Balhara	–60 kg	Alfajare (PLE); W w/o^{FUG}	Jamiyan (MGL); W 100–000^{IPP}	Huang (TPE); L 000–001^{YUK}	—N/a	Abdyldaev (KGZ); L 000–001^{YUK}	5
Kartik Sehrawat	–66 kg	Al-Saadi (QAT); W 110–000^{IPP}	Yerken (KAZ); L 000–100^{IPP}	—N/a	Kuldoshboev (UZB); W 010–000^{WAZ}	Wang (CHN); L 000–001^{YUK}	5
Harshit	–73 kg	Alshuhail (UAE); W 100–000^{IPP}	Khudoykulov (UZB); L 000–101^{IPP}	—N/a	Sawutdee (THA); W 100–000^{IPP}	Adawi (KUW); W 010–000^{WAZ}	3rd place, bronze medalist(s)
Bhavya	–81 kg	—N/a	Kadyrbaev (KGZ); L 000–100^{IPP}	—N/a		Batkhuyag (MGL); L 000–101^{IPP}	5
Ram Kumar	–90 kg	—N/a	Chinon (THA); W 100–000^{IPP}	Tanirbergen (KAZ); L 000–100^{IPP}	—N/a	Barfaraz (IRI); L 000–010^{WAZ}	5

Girls

Athlete	Event	Round of 16	Quarterfinals	Semifinals	Repechage	Final / BMM	
Athlete	Event	Opposition Score	Opposition Score	Opposition Score	Opposition Score	Opposition Score	Rank
Nikita	–40 kg	—N/a	Bao (TPE); W 001–000^{YUK}	Boltabaeva (UZB); L 000–100^{IPP}	—N/a	Zhanakhmet (KAZ); L 000–001^{YUK}	5
Tania Das	–48 kg	—N/a	Enkhtur (MGL); W 100–000^{IPP}	Shakibaei (IRI); L 000–110^{IPP}	—N/a	Talgartbekova (KGZ); L 000–001^{YUK}	5
Shravani Dike	–57 kg	Demuul (MGL); L 011–100^{IPP}	Did not advance to next round				
Monika Khuyenthem	–63 kg	—N/a	Adaminova (KGZ); W 100–000^{IPP}	Akhmedova (UZB); W 100–000^{IPP}	—N/a	Fatimah (INA); L 000–100^{IPP}	2nd place, silver medalist(s)
Ira Makode	–70 kg	—N/a	Kanaeva (KGZ); W 100–000^{IPP}	Turaeva (UZB); L 000–100^{IPP}	—N/a	Rompho (THA); W 001–002^{YUK}	5

== Kabaddi ==
The Amateur Kabaddi Federation of India announced both the boys' and girls' squads for the games respectively on 11 October 2025. India secured gold medals in both events and achieved a clean sweep in the kabaddi discipline respectively.

=== Squads ===
Boys (state)	Girls (state)
Abinesh Mohandass (Tamil Nadu); Aditya (Goa); Akash (Haryana); Akhil (Goa); Anuj Chaudhary (Vidarbha); Aryan (SAI); Harish Gadde (Andhra Pradesh); Harsh (Haryana); Ishant (Haryana); Keshav (Goa); Prasad Dighole (Maharashtra); Rahul Singh Bohra (Uttarakhand); Sachin Chaudhary (Rajasthan); Shubham (SAI)	Akshita Devanda (Rajasthan); Arpita (Haryana); Bhumika (Uttarakhand); Diksha (SAI); Karthika Ramesh (Tamil Nadu); Khushi (Delhi); Komal (SAI); Krishna (Rajasthan); Lakshita Gurjar (Rajasthan); Nikita (Haryana); Nikita Devanda (Rajasthan); Preeti Thakur (Himachal Pradesh); Priyanka Padhan (Odisha); Serena Mhaskar (Maharashtra)

=== Results ===
Event	Group Stage							Final	
Event	Opposition Score	Opposition Score	Opposition Score	Opposition Score	Opposition Score	Opposition Score	Rank	Opposition Score	Rank
Boys' team	Bangladesh; W 83–19	Sri Lanka; W 89–16	Pakistan; W 81–26	Iran; W 46–29	Bahrain; W 84–40	Thailand; W 85–30	1 Q	Iran; W 35–32	1st place, gold medalist(s)
Girls' team	Bangladesh; W 46–18	Thailand; W 70–23	Sri Lanka; W 73–10	Iran; W 59–26	—N/a		1 Q	Iran; W 75–21	1st place, gold medalist(s)

== Kurash ==
Athlete	Event	Round of 16	Quarterfinals	Semifinals	Final	
Athlete	Event	Opposition Score	Opposition Score	Opposition Score	Opposition Score	Rank
Vaibhav Ohri	Boys' –65 kg	Allaith (BHN); W 10–00^{KHA}	Baghchighi (IRI); L 00–05^{YON}	Did not advance to next round		
Arvind	Boys' –80 kg	—N/a	Davlatzoda (TJK); W 10–00^{KHA}	Golibov (UZB); L 00–10^{KHA}	—N/a	3rd place, bronze medalist(s)
Kanishka Bidhuri	Girls' –52 kg	Tobokelova (KGZ); W 03-00^{CHA}	Khundee (THA); W 05-00^{YON}	Jalaloddin (IRI); W 10–00^{KHA}	Karimova (UZB); L 00-03^{CHA}	2nd place, silver medalist(s)
Khushi	Girls' –70 kg	—N/a		Tursunova (UZB); L 00–05^{YON}	—N/a	3rd place, bronze medalist(s)

== Mixed martial arts ==
=== Traditional ===
Boys

Athlete	Event	Group Stage		Quarterfinals	Semifinals	Final	
Athlete	Event	Opposition Score	Opposition Score	Opposition Score	Opposition Score	Opposition Score	Rank
Yash Muthal	70 kg	—N/a		Qayomi (AFG); L MAJ	Did not advance to next round		
Shaurya Gandhi	75 kg	Ebrahimi (AFG); L UNA	Sharshenbaev (KGZ); L SUBN	—N/a			5
Veer Bhadu	80 kg	Hajikhajehlou (IRI); L SUBN	Barisri (THA); W UNA	—N/a			3rd place, bronze medalist(s)

Girls

Athlete	Event	Group Stage		Final	
Athlete	Event	Opposition Score	Opposition Score	Opposition Score	Rank
Shriya Satam	50 kg	Alhammadi (UAE); W MAJ	Akzholova (KGZ); W UNA	Bakiyeva (KAZ); L SUBA	2nd place, silver medalist(s)

=== Modern ===
Boys

Athlete	Event	Group Stage		Round of 16	Quarterfinals	Semifinals	Final	
Athlete	Event	Opposition Score	Opposition Score	Opposition Score	Opposition Score	Opposition Score	Opposition Score	Rank
Ishan Vyas	65 kg	—N/a			Kodirov (UZB); L SUBA	Did not advance to next round		
Mohammed Almeer	75 kg	—N/a			Bakhromov (TJK); L UNA	Did not advance to next round		

== Muaythai ==
Boys

Athlete	Event	Qualification		Round of 16	Quarterfinals	Semifinals	Final	
Athlete	Event	Score	Rank	Opposition Score	Opposition Score	Opposition Score	Opposition Score	Rank
Suraj	–45 kg	—N/a		Alqahtani (KSA); W 20–18	Faiz (MAS); L 27–30	Did not advance to next round		
Jirankumar Konthoujam	–60 kg	—N/a		Ghuloom (BHR); L w/o	Did not advance to next round			
Mudit Gupta	Wai Kru 14–15	7.20	8	Did not advance to next round				

Girls

Athlete	Event	Qualification		Round of 16	Quarterfinals	Semifinals	Final	
Athlete	Event	Score	Rank	Opposition Score	Opposition Score	Opposition Score	Opposition Score	Rank
Parish Handique	–48 kg 14–15	—N/a		Facsoy (PHI); L 17–20	Did not advance to next round			
Vidhi Sharma	–48 kg 16–17	—N/a		Chinzorig (MGL); L 27-30	Did not advance to next round			
Anjum Palliyalthodi	–51 kg 16–17	—N/a			Do Phuong (VIE); L 26–30	Did not advance to next round		
Mohini Samariya	–54 kg 16–17	—N/a		Do Phuong (KAZ); L 26-30	Did not advance to next round			
Alphonsa Wriang	Wai Kru 16–17	8.27	4Q	—N/a			8.47	3rd place, bronze medalist(s)

Mixed

Athlete	Event	Qualification		Final	
Athlete	Event	Score	Rank	Opposition Score	Rank
Harshita; Yuvraj Singh	Mai Muay	6.70	7	Did not advance	

== Pencak silat ==
India sent two representatives to the Asian Youth Games. Both athletes were eliminated from the quarter-finals and the country remained medal-less in this discipline.

Athlete	Event	Round of 16	Quarterfinals	Semifinals	Final	
Athlete	Event	Opposition Score	Opposition Score	Opposition Score	Opposition Score	Rank
Sakshi Thakur	Mens' 51–55 kg	—N/a	Carpio (PHI); L 17–83	Did not advance		
Thoithoiba Leikhram	Women's 59–63 kg	—N/a	Bikboev (KGZ); L 15–29	Did not advance		

== Swimming ==
Freestyle

Athlete	Event	Heat		Final	
Athlete	Event	Result	Rank	Result	Rank
Nitishsai Harinath	Boys' 50m	23.71	4Q	23.72	5
Dhakshan Shashikumar	Boys' 100m	53.55	17	Did not advance	
Dhakshan Shashikumar	Boys' 200m	1:54.44	3Q	1:53.09	4
Dhakshan Shashikumar	Boys' 400m	4:03.61	9R	4:00.87	7
Dhakshan Shashikumar; Nitheesh Murugesh; Nitishsai Harinath; Tirthank Pegu	Boys' 4x100m	3:34.68	9	Did not advance	
Charita Phanindranath	Girls' 50m	27.09	12	Did not advance	
Rujula Shashidhara	Girls' 50m	27.11	13	Did not advance	
Dhinidhi Desinghu	Girls' 100m	58.01	6Q	57.72	5
Rujula Shashidhara	Girls' 100m	1:00.50	18	Did not advance	
Aditi Hegde	Girls' 200m	2:09.91	10	Did not advance	
Dhinidhi Desinghu	Girls' 200m	2:06.02	4Q	2:03.40	5
Aditi Hegde	Girls' 400m	4:29.22	5Q	4:32.00	7
Dhinidhi Desinghu	Girls' 400m	4:31.15	8Q	4:21.86	5
Aditi Hegde; Dhinidhi Desinghu; Rujula Shashidhara; Vihitha Loganathan	Girls' 4x100m	4:01.01	8Q	4:05.73	8
	Mixed 4x100m	30 October; 13:54 IST			

Butterfly

Athlete	Event	Heat		Final	
Athlete	Event	Result	Rank	Result	Rank
Aryan Bhat	Boys' 50m	26.25	22	Did not advance	
Nitishsai Harinath	Boys' 50m	25.91	16	Did not advance	
Dharshan Shashikumar	Boys' 100m	56.77	9	Did not advance	
Vedant Tandale	Boys' 100m	56.31	7Q	56.31	7
Dharshan Shashikumar	Boys' 200m	30 October; 12:50 IST			
Tirthank Pegu	Boys' 200m	30 October; 13:02 IST			

Backstroke

Athlete	Event	Heat		Final	
Athlete	Event	Result	Rank	Result	Rank
Suhas Mylari	Boys' 50m	27.49	13	Did not advance	
Suhas Mylari	Boys' 100m	59.36	12	Did not advance	
Suhas Mylari	Boys' 200m	2:11.30	14	Did not advance	
Sagnika Roy	Girls' 50m	31.29	18	Did not advance	
Vihitha Loganathan	Girls' 50m	31.54	20	Did not advance	
Sri Sagi	Girls' 100m	1:08.59	19	Did not advance	
Vihitha Loganathan	Girls' 100m	1:08.69	20	Did not advance	
Sri Sagi	Girls' 200m	2:23.59	11	Did not advance	
Vihitha Loganathan	Girls' 200m	2:33.00	20	Did not advance	

Breaststroke

Athlete	Event	Heat		Final	
Athlete	Event	Result	Rank	Result	Rank
Nitheesh Murugesh	Boys' 50m	30 October; 12:36 IST			

Medley

Athlete	Event	Heat		Final	
Athlete	Event	Result	Rank	Result	Rank
Nitheesh Murugesh	Boys' 200m	30 October; 13:14 IST			
Dhakshan Shashikumar; Nitheesh Murugesh; Suhas Mylari; Vedant Tandale	Boys' 4x100m	3:55.21	7Q	3:54.43	7
Charita Phanindranath; Nitheesh Murugesh; Vedant Tandale; Vihitha Loganathan	Mixed 4x100m	4:17.54	12	Did not advance	

== Table tennis ==
Singles

Athlete	Event	Group Stage				Round of 32	Round of 16	Quarterfinals	Semifinals	Final	
Athlete	Event	Opposition Score	Opposition Score	Opposition Score	Rank	Opposition Score	Opposition Score	Opposition Score	Opposition Score	Opposition Score	Rank
Ritvik Gupta (15)	Boys	Hashem (BHR); W 3–0	Ankhbayar (MGL); W 3–0	—N/a	1Q	Christian (INA); W 3–0	Li (CHN); L 1–3	Did not advance to next round			
Sahil Rawat (17)	Boys	Nisham (MDV); W 3–0	Al-Abdulla (QAT); W 3–1	—N/a	1Q	Amiri (IRI); L 2–3	Did not advance to next round				
Sarthak Arya (28)	Boys	Man (HKG); L 1–3	Marin (PHI); W 3–1	—N/a	2Q	Zhou (CHN); L 0–3	Did not advance to next round				
Divyanshi Bhowmick (4)	Girls	Wei (CHN); W 3–0	Xaiphetvong (LAO); W 3–0	—N/a	1Q	Vijittham (THA); W 3–0	Lin (TPE); L 2–3	Did not advance to next round			
Hansini Mathan (16)	Girls	Ahmed (YEM); W 3–0	Fu (KAZ); W 3–0	Adam (MDV); W 3–0	1Q	Batmunkh (MGL); W 3–1	Choi (KOR); L 2–3	Did not advance to next round			
Syndrela Das (5)	Girls	Putri (INA); W 3–0	Vijittham (THA); W 3–2	—N/a	1Q	Fu (KAZ); W 3–0	Wei (CHN); L 2–3	Did not advance to next round			

Doubles

Athlete	Event	Round of 32	Round of 16	Quarterfinals	Semifinals	Final	
Athlete	Event	Opposition Score	Opposition Score	Opposition Score	Opposition Score	Opposition Score	Rank
Divyanshi Bhowmick; Ritvik Gupta (10)	Mixed	Adam / Imran (MDV); W 3–0	Takahashi / Iwaida (JPN); W 3–1	Yao / Li (CHN); L 1–3	Did not advance to next round		
Syndrela Das; Sarthak Arya (4)	Mixed	Nafiz / Rafiu (MDV); W 3–0	Cachamit / Soiphuang (THA); W 3–0	Heo / Lee (KOR); W 3–2	Hu / Tang (CHN); L 2–3	Did not advance	3rd place, bronze medalist(s)

== Taekwondo ==
Boys

Athlete	Event	Round of 32	Round of 16	Quarterfinals	Semifinals	Final	
Athlete	Event	Opposition Score	Opposition Score	Opposition Score	Opposition Score	Opposition Score	Rank
Tejas Yadav	–48 kg	You (TPE); W 2–0	Alshahrani (KSA); L 0–2	Did not advance to next round			
Rajan Kumar	–55 kg	—N/a	Samandarov (UZB); L 0–2	Did not advance to next round			
Nihal Dewali	–63 kg	Abdullah (PAK); W 2–0	Liu (CHN); L 1–2	Did not advance to next round			
Thanoj Keesara	–73 kg	—N/a	Alshammari (KUW); W 2–0	Geryan (IRI); L 0–2	Did not advance to next round		
Hardik Ahlawat	+73 kg	—N/a	Ali Saeed (UAE); W 2–0	Tran Ho Nhan (VIE); L 0–2	Did not advance to next round		
Samarth Gaikwad	Freestyle; Poomsae	—N/a				4.880	8
Debasish Das	Recognised; Poomsae	—N/a	Osman (BAN); W 8.0700–7.4900	Amgalan (MGL); W 8.2200–8.0000	Gao (CHN); L 8.5100–8.5400	—N/a	3rd place, bronze medalist(s)

Girls

Athlete	Event	Round of 32	Round of 16	Quarterfinals	Semifinals	Final	
Athlete	Event	Opposition Score	Opposition Score	Opposition Score	Opposition Score	Opposition Score	Rank
Rishita Rawat	–44 kg	—N/a	Patnanthahirun (THA); L 0–2	Did not advance to next round			
Ankitha Kanth	–49 kg	Wang (TPE); L 0–2	Did not advance to next round				
Dhanashree Pawar	–55 kg	—N/a	Battseren (MGL); L 0–2	Did not advance to next round			
Gharluxmi Phurailaptam	–63 kg	—N/a	Albishi (KSA); W 2-0	Busila (JOR); L 1–2	Did not advance to next round		
Prisha Shetty	+63 kg	—N/a	Turtolova (KAZ); W 2-1	Goltapeh (IRI); L 0–2	Did not advance to next round		
Akshara Shanbhag	Freestyle; Poomsae	—N/a				4.560	7
Amini Laa	Recognised; Poomsae	—N/a	Thalahitiye Vithanage (SRI); W 8.0200–7.5100	Li (CHN); L 8.2500–8.3800	Did not advance to next round		

Mixed

Athlete	Event	Round of 16	Quarterfinals	Semifinals	Final	
Athlete	Event	Opposition Score	Opposition Score	Opposition Score	Opposition Score	Rank
Dhanashree Pawar; Gharluxmi Phurailaptam; Hardik Ahlawat; Nihal Dewali	Mixed Team	Hong Kong; W 2–0	Saudi Arabia; W 2–1	Thailand; L 0–2	—N/a	3rd place, bronze medalist(s)
Akshara Shanbhag; Aryan Joshi	Freestyle; Poomsae	—N/a			2.480	7
Yashwini Singh; Shivanshu Patel	Recognised; Poomsae	—N/a	Tran Mai / Truong Doan (VIE); W 8.0100-7.7900	Injang / Yimprasert (THA); L 8.5600-8.1200	—N/a	3rd place, bronze medalist(s)

== Teqball ==
Singles

Player	Event	Group Stage				Semifinals	Final	
Player	Event	Opposition Score	Opposition Score	Opposition Score	Rank	Opposition Score	Opposition Score	Rank
Atharva Sakpal	Boys	(China) Mao; L 1-2	(Malaysia) Bin Abdullah; L 1-2	—N/a	3	Did not advance to next round		
Rajashree Gogoi	Girls	(Lebanon) Khachffe; L 0-2	(Philippines) Cruz; L 0-2	(Bahrain) Abdulaziz; L 0-2	4	Did not advance to next round		

Doubles

Player	Event	Group Stage						Quarter-finals	Semifinals	Final	
Player	Event	Opposition Score	Opposition Score	Opposition Score	Opposition Score	Opposition Score	Rank	Opposition Score	Opposition Score	Opposition Score	Rank
Akash Singha; Rajib Barbhuiya	Boys	(Cambodia) Meun / Cheat; L 0-2	(Iraq) Al-Elayawi / Khammas; L 0-2	(Bahrain) Isa / Hasan; W 2-0	(Philippines) Andres / Erece; W 2-1	(Thailand) Potong / Mahasaksit; L 0-2	4Q	(Malaysia) Amirul / Bin Abdullah; L 1-2	Did not advance to next round		
Rakshana Mageshkumar; Maha Sankar	Girls	(Bahrain) Abdulaziz / Albanna; L 1-2	(Philippines) Cariño / Tabucol; L 1-2	—N/a			3	Did not advance to next round			
Anushka Malleshappa; Adhish Narayanan	Mixed	(Thailand) Kenkhunthod / Ngunkhuntod; L 0-2	(China) Wu / Luan; L 0-2	(Lebanon) Khachffe / El Sabbagh; L 1-2	—N/a		4	Did not advance to next round			

== Weightlifting ==
Group A (Medal events)

Athlete	Event	Snatch					Clean & Jerk				
Athlete	Event	Attempt 1	Attempt 2	Attempt 3	Result	Rank	Attempt 1	Attempt 2	Attempt 3	Result	Rank
Dharmajyoti Dewgharia	Boys' −56 kg	98	~~102~~	~~102~~	98	9	~~125~~	125	133	133	5
Arumugapandian Maharajan	Boys' −60 kg	114	~~118~~	~~121~~	114	2nd place, silver medalist(s)	~~141~~	142	~~144~~	142	2nd place, silver medalist(s)
Abhinob Gogoi	Boys' −71 kg	120	125	~~128~~	125	6	147	~~152~~	152	152	6
Parv Choudhary	Boys' −94 kg	~~144~~	~~144~~	~~145~~	NM		176	181	~~186~~	181	3rd place, bronze medalist(s)
Priteesmita Bhoi	Girls' −44 kg	66	~~68~~	~~69~~	66	2nd place, silver medalist(s)	87	90	92	92 WYR	1st place, gold medalist(s)
Payal	Girls' −48 kg	68	~~71~~	~~72~~	68	7	DNS				
Tikimohini Mallik	Girls' −63 kg	70	73	75	75	6	90	95	98	98	8
Grishma Thorat	Girls' −77 kg	72	77	80	80	6	95	100	~~103~~	100	6

Group B (Non-medal events)

Athlete	Event	Snatch					Clean & Jerk				
Athlete	Event	Attempt 1	Attempt 2	Attempt 3	Result	Rank	Attempt 1	Attempt 2	Attempt 3	Result	Rank
Anik Modi	Boys' −65 kg	101	106	~~110~~	106	2	135	140	~~143~~	140	1

== Wrestling ==
Boys

Athlete	Event	Round of 32	Round of 16	Quarterfinals	Semifinals	Repechages	Final / BMM	
Athlete	Event	Opposition Score	Opposition Score	Opposition Score	Opposition Score	Opposition Score	Opposition Score	Rank
Shivam	–48 kg	—N/a	Rakhatov (KAZ); L 1–1^{VPO1}	Did not advance to next round				
Jaiveer Singh	–55 kg	Gedara (SRI); W 10–0^{VSU}	Phann (CAM); W 10–0^{VSU}	Zarezadeh (IRI); W 4–4^{VPO1}	Yskakbek (KAZ); W 5–0^{VPO}	—N/a	Furusawa (JPN); W 2–6^{VFA}	1st place, gold medalist(s)
Gourav Punia	–65 kg	—N/a	Wu (CHN); W 10–0^{VSU}	Gylyjov (TKM); W 12–2^{VSU1}	Askerbek (KAZ); W 3–2^{VPO1}	—N/a	Mollamohammadi (IRI); L 1–4^{VPO1}	2nd place, silver medalist(s)
Kapil Dahiya	–71 kg	—N/a	Jumanazarov (UZB); L 0–10^{VSU}	Did not advance to next round				
Saurabh Yadav	–80 kg	—N/a		Karami (IRI); L 4–9^{VPO1}	Did not advance to next round			

Girls

Athlete	Event	Round of 32	Round of 16	Quarterfinals	Semifinals	Repechages	Final / BMM	
Athlete	Event	Opposition Score	Opposition Score	Opposition Score	Opposition Score	Opposition Score	Opposition Score	Rank
Rachana	–43 kg	—N/a		Bakkozha (KAZ); W 2–0^{VPO}	Shonazarova (UZB); L 2–5^{VPO1}	—N/a	Bakkozha (KAZ); W 11–0^{VSU}	3rd place, bronze medalist(s)
Komal Verma	–49 kg	—N/a		Abdumusaeva (UZB); W 6–1^{VPO1}	Katsume (JPN); L 0–10^{VSU}	—N/a	Mo (CHN); W 3–1^{VPO1}	3rd place, bronze medalist(s)
Moni	–57 kg	—N/a	Ranaweerage (SRI); W 10–0^{VSU}	Nathakham (THA); W 4–0^{VPO}	Xu (CHN); W 8–0^{VPO}	—N/a	Zholdoshbekova (KGZ); W 10–0^{VSU}	1st place, gold medalist(s)
Yashita Rana	–61 kg	—N/a		Jumanazarov (UZB); W 4–1^{VPO1}	Chynybaeva (KGZ); W 6–0^{VPO}	—N/a	Mukat (KAZ); W 5–5^{VPO1}	1st place, gold medalist(s)
Ashvini Vishnoi	–69 kg	—N/a		Saiakhmet (KAZ); W 5–0^{VPO}	Asamalikova (KGZ); W 5–0^{VFA}	—N/a	Zhao (CHN); L 3–10^{VPO1}	2nd place, silver medalist(s)

Legend

- W – Win; L – Loss;
- VFA – Victory by fall
- VPO – Victory by nine or less points where the losing wrestler scores zero points.
- VPO1 – Victory by nine or less points where the losing wrestler scores at least one point.
- VSU – Victory by ten or more points where the losing wrestler scores zero points.
- VSU1 – Victory by ten or more points where the losing wrestler scores at least one point.
