= 2025 Asian Youth Games =

Multi-sport event in Bahrain

III Asian Youth Games
- Country: Bahrain
- Motto: Inspire Dreams, Build a Legacy (Arabic: ألهم، احلم، وابنِ إرثاً)
- Teams: 45
- Athletes: 4,051
- Events: 264 in 26 sports (29 disciplines)
- Opening: 22 October 2025
- Closing: 31 October 2025
- Opened by: Nasser bin Hamad Al Khalifa; Prince of Bahrain
- Closed by: Timothy Fok; Vice President of the Olympic Council of Asia
- Torch lighter: Ruqaya Al-Ghasra
- Main venue: Exhibition World Bahrain (opening ceremony); Khalifa Sports City Hall (closing ceremony)
- Website: https://bayg.bh/

The 2025 Asian Youth Games, officially the 3rd Asian Youth Games, and commonly Bahrain 2025, was the third edition of the Asian Youth Games, a pan-Asian multi-sport event that took place in Bahrain from 22 to 31 October 2025. It marked the first time the Games were held since the last in 2013, after the two previous editions in 2017 and 2021 were cancelled.

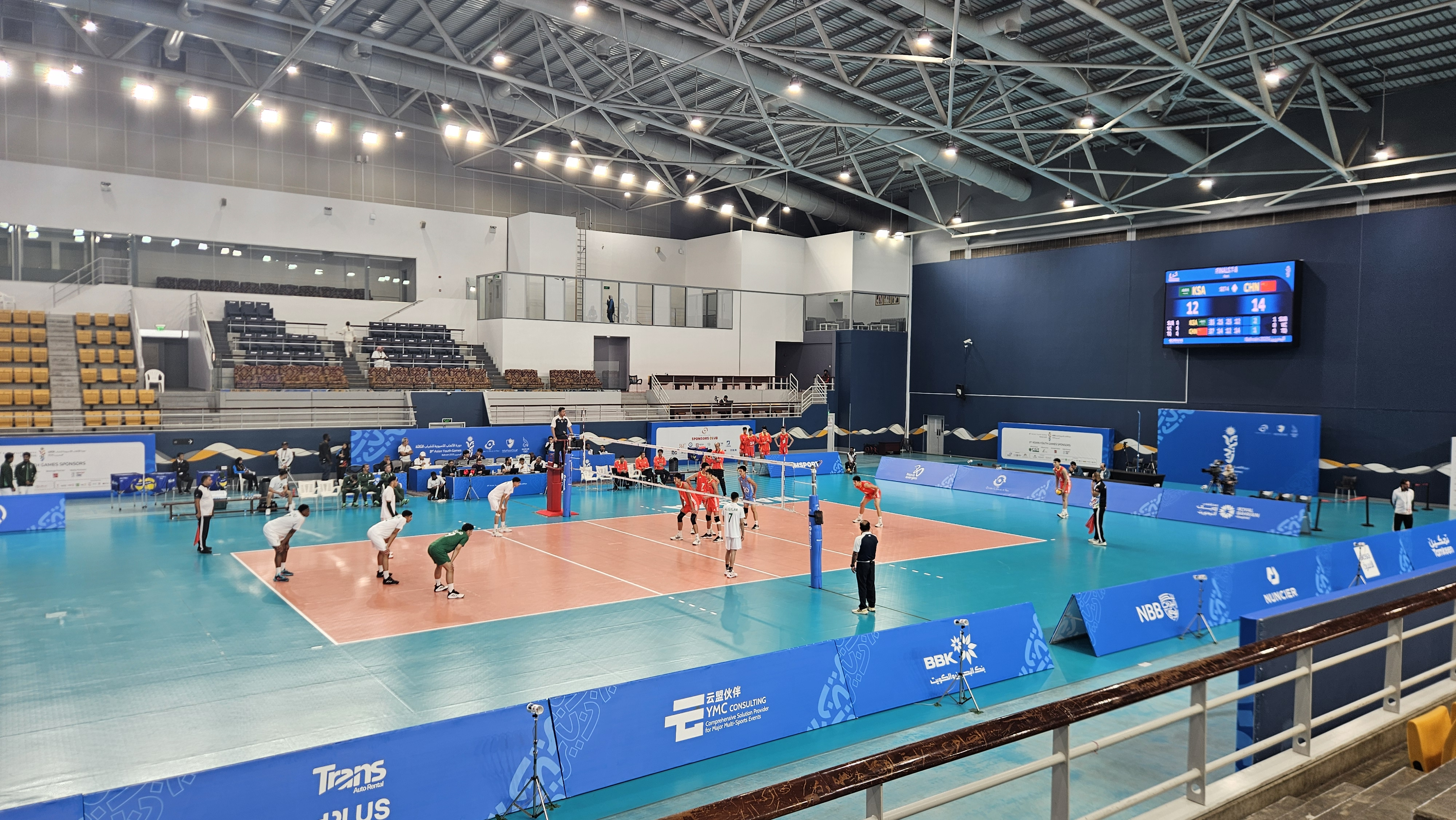
A volleyball match between Saudi Arabia and China at the 2025 Asian Youth Games.

== Host selection ==
On 28 September 2019, during the 73rd meeting of the OCA Executive Board in Doha, Qatar, the Olympic Council of Asia awarded the 2025 Asian Youth Games hosting rights to Tashkent, Uzbekistan. Tashkent would have hosted the Games from 7 to 17 September.

In late 2024, the National Olympic Committee of the Republic of Uzbekistan reported that the Tashkent Olympic City, a sports complex that was being built for the Games, was behind in construction due to constraints caused by the COVID-19 pandemic, and requested the Olympic Council of Asia to postpone the Games. However, the OCA refused the postponement because of the events sports' status as Asian qualifiers for the 2026 Summer Youth Olympics in Dakar, Senegal. Because of this, Tashkent withdrew from hosting in December. Towards the end of the 2025 edition, Tashkent would be awarded the 2029 Games after Phnom Penh, Cambodia, withdrew.

On 26 December 2024, the Olympic Council of Asia awarded the hosting rights to the country of Bahrain, after signing a memorandum of understanding with the Bahrain Olympic Committee.

== Venues ==
City/Area	Venue		Events	Capacity
Sakhir	Exhibition World Bahrain	Grand Hall	Opening ceremony	4,000
Sakhir	Exhibition World Bahrain	Grand Hall A, B	Esports	TBA
Sakhir	Exhibition World Bahrain	Grand Hall C, D, E	Muaythai	TBA
Sakhir	Exhibition World Bahrain	Hall 1	Mixed martial arts	TBA
Sakhir	Exhibition World Bahrain	Hall 1	Ju-jitsu	TBA
Sakhir	Exhibition World Bahrain	Hall 1	Pencak silat	TBA
Sakhir	Exhibition World Bahrain	Hall 2	Judo	TBA
Sakhir	Exhibition World Bahrain	Hall 2	Taekwondo	TBA
Sakhir	Exhibition World Bahrain	Hall 2	Kurash	TBA
Sakhir	Exhibition World Bahrain	Hall 3	Weightlifting	TBA
Sakhir	Exhibition World Bahrain	Hall 7	Wrestling (indoor)	TBA
Sakhir	Exhibition World Bahrain	Hall 9	Boxing	TBA
Sakhir	Exhibition World Bahrain	Hall 10	Table tennis	TBA
Sakhir	Exhibition World Bahrain	Hall 10	Teqball	TBA
Sakhir	Bahrain Royal Equestrian and Endurance Federation		Camel racing	600
Sakhir	Bahrain Royal Equestrian and Endurance Federation		Equestrian (endurance)	600
Riffa	Isa Sports City	Bahrain National Stadium	Athletics	24,000
Riffa	Isa Sports City	Hall B	Volleyball (women's)	TBA
Riffa	Isa Sports City	Hall C	Volleyball (men's)	TBA
Riffa	Isa Sports City	Hall D	Badminton	TBA
Riffa	Isa Sports City	Hall D	Kabaddi	TBA
Isa Town	Khalifa Sport City	Hall	Closing ceremony	3,600
Isa Town	Khalifa Sport City	Hall	Futsal	3,600
Isa Town	Khalifa Sport City	Swimming Pool	Swimming	500
Galali	Sama Bay		Beach Volleyball	TBA
Galali	Sama Bay		Wrestling (beach)	TBA
Manama	Umm Al Hassam Sports Halls	Basketball Hall	3x3 basketball	1,164
Manama	Umm Al Hassam Sports Halls	Handball Hall	Handball	1,164
Manama	Military Sports Union		Equestrian (jumping)	TBA
Al Mazrowiah	Royal Golf Club		Golf	TBA
Zallaq	Sofitel Bahrain Zallaq Thalassa		Triathlon	TBA
Zallaq	NBH Loop		Road cycling	TBA

== Sports ==
26 medal sports were held. The sports of boxing, camel racing, cycling, equestrian, esports, futsal, ju-jitsu, kabaddi, kurash, mixed martial arts, muaythai, pencak silat, teqball, triathlon, volleyball and wrestling made their Asian Youth Games debut.

- 3x3 basketball (2)
- Athletics (37)
- Badminton (3)
- Boxing (14)
- Camel racing (2)
- Cycling (5)
- Equestrian
  - Show Jumping (2)
  - Endurance (2)
- Esports (4)
- Futsal (2)
- Golf (4)
- Handball (2)
- Judo (16)
- Ju-jitsu (9)
- Kabaddi (2)
- Kurash (4)
- Mixed martial arts (15)
- Muaythai (17)
- Pencak silat (3)
- Swimming (34)
- Table tennis (3)
- Taekwondo (17)
- Teqball (5)
- Triathlon (3)
- Volleyball
  - Beach volleyball (2)
  - Volleyball (2)
- Weightlifting (32)
- Wrestling
  - Beach wrestling (5)
  - Wrestling (16)

== Participating nations ==
All 45 National Olympic Committees who are members of the Olympic Council of Asia sent delegations.

- Afghanistan (33)
- Bahrain (207) (host)
- Bangladesh (60)
- Bhutan (9)
- Brunei (5)
- Cambodia (50)
- China (288)
- Hong Kong (125)
- India (217)
- Indonesia (123)
- Iran (238)
- Iraq (27)
- Japan (49)
- Jordan (124)
- Kazakhstan (244)
- Kuwait (69)
- Kyrgyzstan (141)
- Laos (14)
- Lebanon (19)
- Macau (15)
- Malaysia (112)
- Maldives (56)
- Mongolia (134)
- Myanmar (1)
- Nepal (8)
- North Korea (14)
- Oman (18)
- Pakistan (66)
- Palestine (31)
- Philippines (143)
- Qatar (66)
- Saudi Arabia (150)
- Singapore (53)
- South Korea (77)
- Sri Lanka (100)
- Syria (22)
- Chinese Taipei (153)
- Tajikistan (66)
- Thailand (325)
- Timor-Leste (5)
- Turkmenistan (38)
- United Arab Emirates (137)
- Uzbekistan (188)
- Vietnam (47)
- Yemen (25)

== Calendar ==
The calendar was last updated on 13 October 2025.

OC	Opening ceremony	●	Event competitions	1	Event finals	CC	Closing ceremony

October 2025		19th Sun	20th Mon	21st Tue	22nd Wed	23rd Thu	24th Fri	25th Sat	26th Sun	27th Mon	28th Tue	29th Wed	30th Thu	31st Fri	Events
Ceremonies					OC									CC	—N/a
3x3 basketball						●	●	●	●	2					2
Athletics						8	9	11	9						37
Badminton										●	●	●	3		3
Boxing						●	●	●	●	●	●		14		14
Camel racing										2					2
Cycling							1		1	1	1	1			5
Equestrian						●	1		1				2		4
Esports								●	2	●	1	●	1		4
Futsal						●	●	●	●	●	●	1	1		2
Golf						●	●	4							4
Handball		●	●	●		●	●	●	●	●	●		2		2
Judo												8	8		16
Ju-jitsu												4	5		9
Kabaddi		●	●	●	●	2									2
Kurash		2	2												4
Mixed martial arts						●	●	15							15
Muaythai						●	●	●	17						17
Pencak silat		●	3												3
Swimming										10	10	7	7		34
Table tennis									●	●	●	1	2		3
Taekwondo						6	4	3	4						17
Teqball			●	●	●	5									5
Triathlon						2		1							3
Volleyball	Beach volleyball		●	●		●	●	●	2						2
Volleyball	Volleyball	●	●	●	●	●	●	●	●	●		2			2
Weightlifting									6	6	6	6	8		32
Wrestling	Beach wrestling												5		5
Wrestling	Wrestling										8	8			16
Daily medal events		2	5	0	0	23	15	34	42	21	26	38	58	0	264
October 2025		19th Sun	20th Mon	21st Tue	22nd Wed	23rd Thu	24th Fri	25th Sat	26th Sun	27th Mon	28th Tue	29th Wed	30th Thu	31st Fri	Events

== Medal table ==
* Host nation (Bahrain)

Rank	Nation	Gold	Silver	Bronze	Total
1	China	63	49	35	147
2	Uzbekistan	37	16	28	81
3	Kazakhstan	24	29	40	93
4	Iran	22	18	36	76
5	Thailand	15	15	18	48
6	India	13	18	17	48
7	Hong Kong	13	13	10	36
8	United Arab Emirates	12	9	10	31
9	North Korea	8	5	2	15
10	Chinese Taipei	7	9	24	40
11	South Korea	7	7	11	25
12	Philippines	7	7	10	24
13	Bahrain*	5	5	3	13
14	Saudi Arabia	5	4	13	22
15	Indonesia	4	6	18	28
16	Japan	4	6	8	18
17	Iraq	3	6	5	14
18	Tajikistan	2	3	15	20
19	Singapore	2	3	2	7
20	Jordan	2	2	9	13
21	Kyrgyzstan	1	9	11	21
22	Vietnam	1	7	11	19
23	Malaysia	1	2	9	12
24	Afghanistan	1	2	3	6
25	Qatar	1	2	1	4
26	Sri Lanka	1	1	5	7
27	Turkmenistan	1	1	4	6
28	Kuwait	1	1	1	3
29	Palestine	1	0	1	2
30	Mongolia	0	5	13	18
31	Cambodia	0	2	2	4
32	Pakistan	0	1	2	3
33	Lebanon	0	1	0	1
34	Bangladesh	0	0	2	2
34	Oman	0	0	2	2
34	Yemen	0	0	2	2
Totals (36 entries)		264	264	383	911

== Marketing ==
=== Mascot ===
The mascot for the 2025 Asian Youth Games was unveiled in August 2025. The mascot is called Shabab, an Arabian oryx. The name Shahab comes from a traditional name often used in the Gulf and Middle East, especially in Bahrain. The mascot shows the values and energy of Bahraini youth, connecting the country's traditions with its future. Shahab represents Bahrain's desert heritage and inspires young people to do their best in sports and in life. Shabab is also accompanied by two human children, Najm and Dana.

== See also ==
- 2026 Summer Youth Olympics
- 2025 Asian Youth Para Games
