= Japan at the 2025 Asian Youth Games =

- IOC code: JPN
- NOC: Japanese Olympic Committee
- Website: www.joc.or.jp

in Bahrain 22 - 31 October 2025
- Competitors: 49 (28 boys and 21 girls) in 10 sports
- Flag bearer: Nana Kawashima
- Medals Ranked 16th: Gold 4 Silver 6 Bronze 8 Total 18

Asian Youth Games appearances
- 2009; 2013; 2025

Japan participated in the 2025 Asian Youth Games in Bahrain on 22 – 31 October 2025. This was the nation's third appearance in the competition since the 2009 and 2013 editions. Japan sent 49 athletes to the games. Japan finished 16th at the medal table with four gold, six silver, and eight bronze medals.

== Competitors ==
Sport	Men	Women	Total
Boxing	4	4	8
Cycling	4	1	5
Mixed martial arts	0	1	1
Muaythai	1	0	1
Table tennis	1	1	2
Taekwondo	3	3	6
Teqball	1	0	1
Triathlon	3	2	5
Weightlifting	3	1	4
Wrestling	8	8	16
Total	28	21	49

== Medalists ==
Medal	Name	Sport	Event	Date
Gold	Yukiho Okuma; Kanta Ine; Tsubomi Yokokura; Main Takata	Triathlon	Mixed relay	October 25
Gold	Nana Kozuka	Wrestling	Girls' freestyle 53 kg	October 28
Gold	Yuu Katsume	Wrestling	Girls' freestyle 49 kg	October 29
Gold	Masamune Ushimado	Wrestling	Boys' freestyle 48 kg	October 29
Silver	Atsuhi Takada	Mixed martial arts	Girls' 55 kg	October 25
Silver	Hoshina Ameku	Weightlifting	Boys' 56 kg snatch	October 26
Silver	Satoya Kobayashi	Wrestling	Boys' freestyle 71 kg	October 28
Silver	An Nakanishi	Wrestling	Girls' freestyle 40 kg	October 28
Silver	Yamato Furusawa	Wrestling	Boys' freestyle 55 kg	October 29
Silver	Miki Miura	Boxing	Girls' 60 kg	October 30
Bronze	Kotaro Nomoto	Muaythai	Boys' 51 kg	October 25
Bronze	Ayu Higa	Weightlifting	Boys' 60 kg snatch	October 26
Bronze	Ryusei Kitamura	Boxing	Boys' 54 kg	October 28
Bronze	Kira Hasegawa	Boxing	Boys' 50 kg	October 28
Bronze	Haruku Shiina	Wrestling	Boys' freestyle 51 kg	October 28
Bronze	Waka Awano	Wrestling	Girls' freestyle 61 kg	October 28
Bronze	Hanano Oya	Wrestling	Girls' freestyle 46 kg	October 28
Bronze	Mira Higashi	Wrestling	Girls' freestyle 43 kg	October 29

Medals by sport
Sport	1st place, gold medalist(s)	2nd place, silver medalist(s)	3rd place, bronze medalist(s)	Total
Wrestling	3	3	4	10
Triathlon	1	0	0	1
Boxing	0	1	2	3
Weightlifting	0	1	1	2
Mixed martial arts	0	1	0	1
Muaythai	0	0	1	1
Total	4	6	8	18

Medals by gender
Gender	1st place, gold medalist(s)	2nd place, silver medalist(s)	3rd place, bronze medalist(s)	Total
Female	2	3	3	8
Male	1	3	5	9
Mixed	1	0	0	1
Total	4	6	8	18
