= Indonesia at the 2025 Asian Youth Games =

- IOC code: INA
- NOC: Indonesian Olympic Committee
- Website: www.nocindonesia.or.id (in English)

in Manama, Bahrain 22 October 2025 – 31 October 2025
- Competitors: 123 in 21 sports
- Flag bearers: Miracle Christiano; Syelomitha Avrilaviza Wongkar
- Medals Ranked 15th: Gold 4 Silver 6 Bronze 18 Total 28

Asian Youth Games appearances (overview)
- 2009; 2013; 2025

Indonesia competed at the 2025 Asian Youth Games in Manama, Bahrain, from 22 to 31 October 2025. This will be Indonesia's third appearance in the competition since the 2009 and 2013 editions. The Indonesian contingent for this year's games consists of 123 athletes across 21 sports disciplines.

== Medalists ==
Medal	Name	Sport	Event	Date
Gold	Furgon Habbil Winata	Pencak silat	Boys' 51–55 kg	20 October
Gold	Muhammad Rijal Abdillah	Weightlifting	Boys' –60 kg (Clean & Jerk)	26 October
Gold	Raihan Pramono; Athresia Candani	Badminton	Mixed doubles	30 October
Gold	Sashenka Fatimah	Judo	Girls' –63 kg	30 October
Silver	Qiken Dwi Tata Olifia	Pencak silat	Girls' 51–55 kg	20 October
Silver	Aira Martha Ardistri; Wahyu Tri Utomo Sembiring; Maurizka Nur Azizah; Keannan Fathir Arrashy Rolland	Triathlon	Mixed team relay super sprint	25 October
Silver	Michael Julius Cezar	Esports	Boys' eFootball	26 October
Silver	Reynard Purwanto; Kevin Erlangga Prayitno; Mochamad Taufik; Samuel Septionus	Swimming	Boys' 4 × 100 m freestyle relay	27 October
Silver	Adelia Aulia	Swimming	Girls' 100 m backstroke	29 October
Silver	Sulastri Rahma Aulia; Tina Syifa Sabila Salim; Syelomitha Avrilaviza Wongkar; Tazma Aprilia; Syabilla Hilal Ramadhan; Agni Sakina Rahmi; Shakira Ayu Tirta Wijaya; Calista Maya Ersandita; Naisya Pratama Putri; Wa Ode Ardiana; Chelsa Berliana Nurtomo; Azzahra Dwi Febyane	Volleyball	Girls' team	29 October
Bronze	Zahrotus Syifa	Teqball	Girls' singles	23 October
Bronze	Aira Martha Ardistri	Triathlon	Girls' individual super sprint	23 October
Bronze	Manayra Maritza Siagian	Mixed martial arts	Girls' 45 kg modern	24 October
Bronze	Bumi Magani Abraar Himara	Mixed martial arts	Boys' 55 kg modern	24 October
Bronze	Satria Eka Suryo Basroni	Mixed martial arts	Boys' 60 kg traditional	24 October
Bronze	Gibran Alfarizi	Mixed martial arts	Boys' 65 kg traditional	24 October
Bronze	Queenita Keisha Azzahra	Taekwondo	Girls' –49 kg	25 October
Bronze	Gendis Aulia Syafitri	Athletics	Girls' 500 m	26 October
Bronze	Theodore Citoputra; Wiliam Wijaya; Jayawardana Dornan	Golf	Boys' team	26 October
Bronze	Jayawardana Dornan	Golf	Boys' individual	26 October
Bronze	Kavka Zhafif Putrawitama	Taekwondo	Boys' –63 kg	26 October
Bronze	Hafiyan Azam Nuruddin; Fairuz Bayhaqly	Beach volleyball	Boys' team	26 October
Bronze	Yoshie Honda; Natasha Oeoen; Chelsea Alexandra; Adelia Aulia	Swimming	Girls' 4 × 100 m freestyle relay	27 October
Bronze	Chelsea Alexandra	Swimming	Girls' 50 m backstroke	28 October
Bronze	Fardhan Joe	Badminton	Boys' singles	29 October
Bronze	Alyamaulida Kartika Pertiwi	Weightlifting	Girls' –77 kg (Snatch)	30 October
Bronze	Alyamaulida Kartika Pertiwi	Weightlifting	Girls' –77 kg (Clean & Jerk)	30 October
Bronze	Michelle Fang	Swimming	Girls' 200 m butterfly	30 October

=== Summary ===
Medals by events
Sport	Gold	Silver	Bronze	Total
Pencak silat	1	1	0	2
Weightlifting	1	0	2	3
Badminton	1	0	1	2
Judo	1	0	0	1
Swimming	0	2	3	5
Triathlon	0	1	1	2
Esports	0	1	0	1
Volleyball	0	1	0	1
Mixed martial arts	0	0	4	4
Golf	0	0	2	2
Taekwondo	0	0	2	2
Athletics	0	0	1	1
Beach volleyball	0	0	1	1
Teqball	0	0	1	1
Total	4	6	18	28

Medals by day
Day	Date	Gold	Silver	Bronze	Total
-3	20 October	1	1	0	2
1	23 October	0	0	2	2
2	24 October	0	0	4	4
3	25 October	0	1	1	2
4	26 October	1	1	5	7
5	27 October	0	1	1	2
6	28 October	0	0	1	1
7	29 October	0	2	1	3
8	30 October	2	0	3	5
Total		4	6	18	28

Medals by gender
Gender	Gold	Silver	Bronze	Total
Male	2	2	8	12
Female	1	3	10	14
Mixed	1	1	0	2
Total	4	6	18	28

== 3x3 basketball ==
Event	Group Stage							Quarterfinals	Semifinals	Final
Event	Opposition Score	Opposition Score	Opposition Score	Opposition Score	Opposition Score	Opposition Score	Rank	Opposition Score	Opposition Score	Rank
Boys' team	Bahrain; L 15–21	China; L 10–21	Kyrgyzstan; L 18–20	—N/a			4	Did not advance		
Girls' team	Palestine; W 16–12	Mongolia; W 17–7	Thailand; L 6–21	Sri Lanka; W 17–11	India; L 15–18	Maldives; W 21–6	3 Q	Chinese Taipei; L 12–20	Did not advance	

== Athletics (track and field) ==
Key
- Note–Ranks given for track events are within the athlete's heat only
- Q = Qualified for the next round
- q = Qualified for the next round as a fastest loser or, in field events, by position without achieving the qualifying target
- SB = Season Best
- PB = Personal Best
- NR = National record
- N/A = Round not applicable for the event
- Bye = Athlete not required to compete in round

Track and road events
Men

Athlete(s)	Event	Heat		Semifinal		Final	
Athlete(s)	Event	Result	Rank	Result	Rank	Result	Rank
Nazril Albani Fauzi	3000 m	—N/a				9:18.94	6
Muhammad Fauzan Jakariya	110 m hurdles	15.04	4	—N/a		Did not advance	

Women

Athlete(s)	Event	Heat		Semifinal		Final	
Athlete(s)	Event	Result	Rank	Result	Rank	Result	Rank
Gendis Aulia Syafitri	800 m	2:21.02	3 Q	—N/a		2:14.98	3rd place, bronze medalist(s)

Field events
Men

Athlete(s)	Event	Heat		Semifinal		Final	
Athlete(s)	Event	Result	Rank	Result	Rank	Result	Rank
Kristostomus Kaize	javelin throw	—N/a				54.98	10

== Badminton ==
Singles

Athlete	Event	Round of 64	Round of 32	Round of 16	Quarterfinals	Semifinals	Final	
Athlete	Event	Opposition Score	Opposition Score	Opposition Score	Opposition Score	Opposition Score	Opposition Score	Rank
Maharishiel Gain	Boys	Bye	Suleman (PAK); W 2–0	Aruggoda (SRI); W 2–1	Malhan (UAE); L 0–2	Did not advance to next round		
Fardhan Joe	Boys	Bye	Shreshta (NEP); W 2–0	Jeong (KOR); W 2–0	Lekyim (THA); W 2–1	Luo (CHN); L 1–2	—N/a	3rd place, bronze medalist(s)
Jolin Angelia	Girls	Bye	Phichitpreechasak (THA); L 0–2	Did not advance to next round				
Mayla Pratiwi	Girls	Sayed (KUW); W 2–0	Kalidasan (UAE); W 2–0	Su (TPE); L 1–2	Did not advance to next round			

Doubles

Athlete	Event	Round of 64	Round of 32	Round of 16	Quarterfinals	Semifinals	Final	
Athlete	Event	Opposition Score	Opposition Score	Opposition Score	Opposition Score	Opposition Score	Opposition Score	Rank
Abdul Azib; Fiersha Shafa	Mixed	Bye	Lanuza / Quierez (PHI); W 2–0	Kim / Na (KOR); W 2–0	Cheung / Chu (HKG); L 0–2	Did not advance to next round		
Raihan Pramono; Athresia Candani	Mixed	Bye	Abaalquloub / Alshayji (KUW); W 2–0	Randiligama / Ratnayake (SRI); W 2–0	Jaison / Punera (IND); W 2–1	Jeong / Kim (KOR); W 2–0	Cheung / Chu (HKG); W 2–0	1st place, gold medalist(s)

== Beach volleyball ==
Athlete	Event	Group Stage						Quarter-finals	Semi-finals	Final	
Athlete	Event	Opposition Score	Opposition Score	Opposition Score	Opposition Score	Opposition Score	Rank	Opposition Score	Opposition Score	Opposition Score	Rank
Hafiyan Nuruddin; Fairuz Bayhaqly	Boys	(Thailand) Suwansirirat / Maneewan; L 0–2	(Bahrain) Yaqoob / Warqaa; W 2–0	(Maldives) Ali / Ismail Rasheed; W 2–0	(Sri Lanka) Salpadoruge / Midigaspage Don; W 2–0	(Qatar) Betioui / Mou; W 2–1	2 Q	(Iran) Jahanifar / Marzban; W 2–0	(Kazakhstan) Agabek / Sagynysh; L 1–2	(China) Xin / Ma; W 2–0	2nd place, silver medalist(s)
Ayunda Grahayanti; Chaecyllia Youandhita	Girls	(Mongolia) Elbegbayar / Naranbaatar; W 2–0	(Thailand) Khampila / Hanmon; L 0–2	(Maldives) Nadheem / Mohamed Sidgee; W 2–0	(Brunei) Majed / Falah; W 2–0	(Jordan) Qatabi / Shahaltough; W 2–0	2 Q	(Malaysia) Goh / Qariesya; L 0–2	Did not advance to next round		

== Camel Racing ==
Boys

Athlete(s)	Event	Final	
Athlete(s)	Event	Result	Rank
Mohammad Al Fathih Abdillah	500 m	1:06	11

== Cycling (Road) ==
Athlete	Event	Final	
Athlete	Event	Time	Rank
Hukman Al Fazl	Boy's road race	2:24:24	30
Hukman Al Fazl	Boy's individual time trial	22:59.45	8
Mila Safa Fidela	Girl's road race	1:59:26	10
Mila Safa Fidela	Girl's individual time trial	18:00.08	6

== Equestrian ==
Individual

Athlete	Horse	Penalties	Final jump-Off		Final	
Athlete	Horse	Penalties	Penalties	Time	Time	Rank
Teuku Rifat Renanda Harsya	Manchester-Tren	4	Did not advance		70.95	17
Nurstdinov Zayan Fatih	Meggie Cl	18	Did not advance		81.99	31
Lalu Yuda Pratama Riady Alwi	Dontreaux	22	Did not advance		89.94	33
Gadis Kireina Iskandar	Kerina	—N/a	Did not advance		EL	

Team

Athlete	Horse	Penalties	Final		Total Rank
Athlete	Horse	Penalties	Time	Rank	Total Rank
Nusrtdinov Zayan Fatih	Meggie Cl	0	83.22	1	8
Lalu Yuda Pratama Riady	Dontreaux	0	87.71	1	8
Teuku Rifat Renanda Harsya	Manchester-Tren	4	81.43	26	8
Gadis Kireina Iskandar	Kerina	—N/a	EL		8

== Esports ==
Individual

Athlete	Event	Group Stage					Quarterfinals	Semifinals	Final	
Athlete	Event	Opposition Score	Opposition Score	Opposition Score	Opposition Score	Rank	Opposition Score	Opposition Score	Opposition Score	Rank
Michael Julius Cezar	Boys' eFootball	X Z Deng (HKG); W 1–0	N Phiaxay (LAO); W 1–0	H Almarzooqi (UAE); W 1–0	M Farrukh (UZB); W 1–0	1 Q	Y Ghaleb (BHR); W 2–0	A Farahani (IRI); W 2–1	S Rungratkasikul (THA); L 0–3	2nd place, silver medalist(s)
Akbar Abuya Abqary	Boys' eFootball	Y Ghaleb (BRN); L 0–1	A Q H Alzaki (IRQ); L 0–1	H A M Alfar (SRI); W 1–0	—N/a	3	Did not advance			

Team

Athlete	Event	Group Stage								Semifinals Qualification	Semifinals	Final	
Athlete	Event	Opposition Score	Opposition Score	Opposition Score	Opposition Score	Opposition Score	Opposition Score	Opposition Score	Rank	Opposition Score	Opposition Score	Opposition Score	Rank
Aldan Harvianno; Matthan Abhinaya Itsnan Nurahmad; Muhammad Athar Arrayyan	Boy's Rocket League	Oman (OMA); L 0–2	Bahrain (BRN); L 1–2	United Arab Emirates (UAE); W 2–0	Jordan (JOR); L 0–2	Kazakhstan (KAZ); W 2–0	Kyrgyzstan (KGZ); W 2–0	Saudi Arabia (KSA); L 0–2	5 Q	Bahrain (BRN); L 0–2	Did not advance		

== Golf ==
Boys

Athlete	Event	Round 1	Round 2	Round 3	Total		
Athlete	Event	Score	Score	Score	Score	Par	Rank
Jayawardana Dornan	Individual	69	70	68	207	−9	3rd place, bronze medalist(s)
William Wijaya	Individual	71	74	75	220	+4	=13
Theodore Citoputra	Individual	74	71	81	225	+9	=21
Jayawardana Dornan; William Wijaya; Theodore Citoputra	Team	140	141	143	424	−8	3rd place, bronze medalist(s)

== Kurash ==
Athlete	Event	Round of 16	Quarterfinals	Semifinals	Final	
Athlete	Event	Opposition Score	Opposition Score	Opposition Score	Opposition Score	Rank
Fabian Firmansyah	Boys' –65 kg	Yuldashboev (UZB); L 00–10^{KHA}	Did not advance to next round			
Deswita Maharani Putri	Women's –52 kg	—N/a	Jalaloddin (IRI); L 00–10^{KHA}	Did not advance to next round		

== Mixed martial arts ==
=== Traditional ===
Boys

Athlete	Event	Round of 16	Quarterfinals	Semifinals	Final	
Athlete	Event	Opposition Score	Opposition Score	Opposition Score	Opposition Score	Rank
Satria Eka Suryo Basroni	60 kg	Bye	A Qahtan (BRN); W DSQ	A Hatamianafshari (IRI); L UD	Did not advance	3rd place, bronze medalist(s)
Gibran Alfarizi	65 kg	—N/a	M Shafaeiabandansari (IRI); W UD	S Sultanakhmedov (BRN); L UD	Did not advance	3rd place, bronze medalist(s)

=== Modern ===
Boys

Athlete	Event	Round of 16	Quarterfinals	Semifinals	Final	
Athlete	Event	Opposition Score	Opposition Score	Opposition Score	Opposition Score	Rank
Fachriza Satria Sampora	50 kg	Bye	A Anvarov (UZB); L UD	Did not advance		6
Bumi Magani Abraar Himara	55 kg	K Ry (CAM); W SM	Z Tulegenov (KAZ); W SM	F Khalilov (TJK); L UD	Did not advance	3rd place, bronze medalist(s)
Rangga Dika Mahendra	60 kg	Bye	M Kadirdinov (KGZ); L MD	Did not advance		6

Girls

Athlete	Event	Quarterfinals	Semifinals	Final	
Athlete	Event	Opposition Score	Opposition Score	Opposition Score	Rank
Manayra Maritza Hersianti Siagian	45 kg	A Abbasnezhad (IRI); W MD	N Khaihong (THA); L DSQ	Did not advance	3rd place, bronze medalist(s)

== Muaythai ==
=== Combat discipline ===
Girls'

Athlete	Event	Round of 16	Quarterfinals	Semifinals	Final	Rank
Athlete	Event	Opposition Result	Opposition Result	Opposition Result	Opposition Result	Rank
Jeisya Earlene Kalea	45 kg 14–15	M Sadeghzadehdamchi (IRI); L 26-30	Did not advance			9

== Pencak silat ==
Athlete	Event	Round of 16	Quarterfinals	Semifinals	Final	
Athlete	Event	Opposition Score	Opposition Score	Opposition Score	Opposition Score	Rank
Furgon Habbil Winata	Boys' 51–55 kg	—N/a	Abzhanov (KAZ); W 74–30	Phouk (CAM); W 51–1	Abdulla (BHR); W 81–10	1st place, gold medalist(s)
Qiken Dwi Tata Olifia	Girls' 51–55 kg	—N/a	Kantangkul (THA); W 40–32	Bozorova (UZB); W 54^{+}–54	Carpio (PHI); L 19–33	2nd place, silver medalist(s)

== Weightlifting ==
Men

Athlete	Event	Snatch		Clean & Jerk		Total
Athlete	Event	Result	Rank	Result	Rank	Total
Kevin Andrian Ramadhan	−56 kg	108 kg	5	130 kg	7	238
Muhamad Rijal Abdilah	−60 kg	107 kg	4	143 kg	1st place, gold medalist(s)	250
Leonard Imanuel Aipassa	−65 kg	116 kg	5	146	6	262

Women

Athlete	Event	Snatch		Clean & Jerk		Total
Athlete	Event	Result	Rank	Result	Rank	Total
Absyah Ramadhani Nasution	−48 kg	68 kg	8	80 kg	8	148
Brilianti Chandrika Sukmadewi	−58 kg	75 kg	5	77 kg	6	152
Votcha Lintang Santira	−69 kg	75 kg	6	101 kg	5	176
Alyamaulida Kartika Pertiwi	−77 kg	90 kg	3rd place, bronze medalist(s)	113 kg	3rd place, bronze medalist(s)	203

== Volleyball ==
Event	Preliminary Round			Group Stage			Quarterfinals	Semifinals	Final / BM	
Event	Opposition Score	Opposition Score	Rank	Opposition Score	Opposition Score	Rank	Opposition Score	Opposition Score	Opposition Score	Rank
Boys' team	Thailand; W 3–1	Chinese Taipei; W 3–1	1 Q	China; W 3–0	Iran; L 0–3	2 Q	Uzbekistan; W 3–0	Pakistan; L 1–3	Thailand; L 1–3	4
Girls' team	Kazakhstan; W 3–0	Chinese Taipei; W 3–1	1 Q	Qatar; W 3–0	Iran; L 0–3	2 Q	China; W 3–0	Thailand; W 3–0	Iran; L 2–3	2nd place, silver medalist(s)
