= Esports at the 2025 Asian Youth Games =

- Venue: Exhibition World Bahrain
- Dates: 25–30 October 2025

Esports at the 2025 Asian Youth Games was held in the Grandhall of Exhibition World Bahrain in Sakhir, Bahrain from 25 to 30 October 2025.

Three video games were chosen to be part of the Games, eFootball, Street Fighter 6 and Rocket League for both genders but two girls' events were cancelled due to lack of entries.

== Medalists ==
Event	Gold	Silver	Bronze
Boys' eFootball	Sirawut Rungratkasikul; Thailand	Michael Julius Cezar; Indonesia	Amir Mohammad Farahani; Iran
Boys' Street Fighter 6	Chan Pak Yin; Hong Kong	Lin Jun-xi; Chinese Taipei	Talal Rajikhan; Saudi Arabia
Boys' Rocket League	Saudi Arabia; Hisham Al-Qadi; Saleh Bakhashwin; Yazeed Bakhashwin	Jordan; Adam Abdallah; Ali Al-Far; Yazan Amireh; Mohammad Musallam	Oman; Abdullah Al-Aamri; Meshari Al-Ajmi; Sultan Al-Balushi
Girls' eFootball	Tala Al-Mazrou; Saudi Arabia	Supawadee Dunyachit; Thailand	Sarah Al-Jneibi; United Arab Emirates

== Medal table ==
Rank	Nation	Gold	Silver	Bronze	Total
1	Saudi Arabia (KSA)	2	0	1	3
2	Thailand (THA)	1	1	0	2
3	Hong Kong (HKG)	1	0	0	1
4	Chinese Taipei (TPE)	0	1	0	1
4	Indonesia (INA)	0	1	0	1
4	Jordan (JOR)	0	1	0	1
7	Iran (IRI)	0	0	1	1
7	Oman (OMA)	0	0	1	1
7	United Arab Emirates (UAE)	0	0	1	1
Totals (9 entries)		4	4	4	12

== Results ==
=== Boys' eFootball ===
==== Preliminary round ====
25 October

Group A
Pos	Athlete	Pld	W	L	IRI	MAS	TJK	NEP	KGZ
1	Amir Mohammad Farahani (IRI)	4	4	0	—	2–1	5–0	5–0	6–1
2	Farish Luzman (MAS)	4	3	1	1–2	—	4–0	3–0	5–0
3	Sherzod Benazirzoda (TJK)	4	2	2	0–5	0–4	—	3–2	2–0
4	Kavya Raj Acharya (NEP)	4	1	3	0–5	0–3	2–3	—	3–0
5	Ibrokhimzhon Sativaldiev (KGZ)	4	0	4	1–6	0–5	0–2	0–3	—

Group B
Pos	Athlete	Pld	W	L	INA	UZB	HKG	LAO	UAE
1	Michael Julius Cezar (INA)	4	4	0	—	1–0	0–0^{(4–3)}	6–0	10–0
2	Farrukh Mirkhamitov (UZB)	4	3	1	0–1	—	3–1	3–1	12–0
3	Deng Xin Zhan (HKG)	4	2	2	0–0^{(3–4)}	1–3	—	5–0	9–1
4	Nathithong Phiaxay (LAO)	4	1	3	0–6	1–3	0–5	—	2–0
5	Hamdan Al-Marzooqi (UAE)	4	0	4	0–10	0–12	1–9	0–2	—

Group C
Pos	Athlete	Pld	W	L	THA	KSA	IRI	JOR	KAZ
1	Sirawut Rungratkasikul (THA)	4	4	0	—	4–1	2–1	2–1	5–0
2	Nemer Al-Sharari (KSA)	4	3	1	1–4	—	5–1	1–1^{(3–1)}	5–1
3	Rasoul Ahmadi (IRI)	4	2	2	1–2	1–5	—	2–1	6–1
4	Mohammad Al-Abed (JOR)	4	1	3	1–2	1–1^{(1–3)}	1–2	—	5–0
5	Daniyar Sharabadin (KAZ)	4	0	4	0–5	1–5	1–6	0–5	—

Group D
Pos	Athlete	Pld	W	L	IRQ	BRN	INA	SRI
1	Abdullah Qusay (IRQ)	3	3	0	—	5–1	1–0	10–0
2	Yousif Ghaleb (BRN)	3	2	1	1–5	—	3–2	5–0
3	Abuya Abqary Akbar (INA)	3	1	2	0–1	2–3	—	12–0
4	Haiyan Aqwam (SRI)	3	0	3	0–10	0–5	0–12	—

Source: Official website

==== Knockout round ====
26 October

Quarterfinals
Amir Mohammad Farahani (IRI)	3	2	5
Nemer Al-Sharari (KSA)	2	3	1
Michael Julius Cezar (INA)	4	2
Yousif Ghaleb (BRN)	2	1
Sirawut Rungratkasikul (THA)	2	3
Farish Luzman (MAS)	1	2
Abdullah Qusay (IRQ)	2	5
Farrukh Mirkhamitov (UZB)	0	1

Semifinals
Amir Mohammad Farahani (IRI)	2^{2}	3	1
Michael Julius Cezar (INA)	2^{3}	2	2
Sirawut Rungratkasikul (THA)	1	3	3
Abdullah Qusay (IRQ)	2	0	2

Gold medal match
Michael Julius Cezar (INA)	1	0	1
Sirawut Rungratkasikul (THA)	8	3	5
Bronze medal match
Amir Mohammad Farahani (IRI)	3	3	2	0	2
Abdullah Qusay (IRQ)	0	6	1	1	1

=== Boys' Street Fighter 6 ===
==== Preliminary round ====
27 October

Group A
Pos	Athlete	Pld	W	L	HKG	TPE	KSA	THA	KGZ	MGL
1	Chan Pak Yin (HKG)	5	5	0	—	2–0	2–0	2–0	2–0	2–0
2	Chen You-gang (TPE)	5	4	1	1–2, 0–2	—	2–0	2–0	2–0	2–0
3	Faisal Al-Nafisi (KSA)	5	3	2	0–2, 0–2	1–2, 0–2	—	2–0	2–0	2–0
4	Phasit Phutthima (THA)	5	2	3	0–2, 1–2	0–2, 1–2	0–2, 1–2	—	2–0	2–0
5	Tilek Nazarbekov (KGZ)	5	1	4	0–2, 0–2	0–2, 0–2	0–2, 0–2	1–2, 0–2	—	2–0
6	Gankhuyagiin Narantüshig (MGL)	5	0	5	0–2, 0–2	0–2, 0–2	0–2, 0–2	0–2, 0–2	0–2, 0–2	—

Group B
Pos	Athlete	Pld	W	L	TPE	KSA	JOR	UAE	SRI
1	Lin Jun-xi (TPE)	4	4	0	—	2–0	2–0	2–0	2–0
2	Talal Rajikhan (KSA)	4	2	2	0–2, 0–2	—	2–0	0–2	2–0
3	Mohammad Muarif (JOR)	4	2	2	0–2, 0–2	0–2, 0–2	—	2–0	2–0
4	Hilal Al-Marri (UAE)	4	2	2	0–2, 0–2	2–1, 2–1	0–2, 0–2	—	2–0
5	Haiyan Aqwam (SRI)	4	0	4	0–2, 0–2	0–2, 0–2	0–2, 0–2	0–2, 0–2	—

Source: Official website

==== Knockout round ====
28 October

Quarterfinals
Chan Pak Yin (HKG)	2	2	2
Hilal Al-Marri (UAE)	0	1	0
Chen You-gang (TPE)	2	2	2
Mohammad Muarif (JOR)	0	0	0
Lin Jun-xi (TPE)	2	2	2
Phasit Phutthima (THA)	1	1	0
Talal Rajikhan (KSA)	2	2	0	2
Faisal Al-Nafisi (KSA)	0	0	2	1

Semifinals
Chan Pak Yin (HKG)	2	2	2
Chen You-gang (TPE)	0	0	0
Lin Jun-xi (TPE)	2	1	1	2	2
Talal Rajikhan (KSA)	0	2	2	0	0

Gold medal match
Chan Pak Yin (HKG)	0	0	1	2	2	2	2
Lin Jun-xi (TPE)	2	2	2	1	1	1	1
Bronze medal match
Chen You-gang (TPE)	0	2	2	2	0	0	1
Talal Rajikhan (KSA)	2	0	0	0	2	2	2

=== Boys' Rocket League ===
==== Preliminary round ====
29 October

Pos	Team	Pld	W	L	KSA	JOR	OMA	BRN	INA	UAE	KAZ	KGZ
1	Saudi Arabia	7	7	0	—	2–0	2–0	2–0	2–0	2–0	2–0	2–0
2	Jordan	7	5	2	1–4, 2–7	—	2–1	1–2	2–0	2–0	2–0	2–0
3	Oman	7	5	2	1–8, 3–4	3–4, 4–1, 1–4	—	2–1	2–0	2–0	2–0	2–0
4	Bahrain	7	5	2	2–5, 1–9	2–1, 1–2, 3–2	1–0, 2–3, 3–5	—	2–1	2–0	2–0	2–0
5	Indonesia	7	3	4	1–11, 0–6	2–6, 1–5	3–5, 0–1	1–0, 1–3, 0–4	—	2–0	2–0	2–0
6	United Arab Emirates	7	2	5	0–10, 2–11	0–11, 0–16	0–4, 0–9	0–7, 1–7	1–2, 2–3	—	2–0	2–0
7	Kazakhstan	7	1	6	2–32, 1–5	0–27, 0–20	0–16, 0–13	1–18, 1–16	0–7, 1–10	2–4, 1–5	—	2–0
8	Kyrgyzstan	7	0	7	0–3, 0–2	0–37, 0–37	0–27, 0–34	1–18, 0–5	0–17, 0–10	1–15, 1–13	0–8, 0–9	—

Source: Official website

==== Knockout round ====
30 October

Semifinals qualification
Oman	8	8
United Arab Emirates	2	0
Bahrain	4	3
Indonesia	0	2

Semifinals
Saudi Arabia	8	7	6
Oman	2	1	0
Jordan	1	1	2
Bahrain	0	0	0

Gold medal match
Saudi Arabia	5	3	3
Jordan	2	0	2
Bronze medal match
Oman	5	2	3
Bahrain	1	0	2

=== Girls' eFootball ===
==== Preliminary round ====
25 October

Pos	Athlete	Pld	W	L	KSA	UAE	THA	LAO	SRI	MGL
1	Tala Al-Mazrou (KSA)	5	5	0	—	3–0	2–1	4–2	12–0	16–0
2	Sarah Al-Jneibi (UAE)	5	4	1	0–3	—	1–0	3–1	4–0	6–0
3	Supawadee Dunyachit (THA)	5	3	2	1–2	0–1	—	3–0	6–0	8–0
4	Viengxila Thammavong (LAO)	5	2	3	2–4	1–3	0–3	—	5–0	6–0
5	Sayuni Sadushika (SRI)	5	1	4	0–12	0–4	0–6	0–5	—	0–0^{(2–1)}
6	Batbayaryn Tsengeg (MGL)	5	0	5	0–16	0–6	0–8	0–6	0–0^{(1–2)}	—

Source: Official website

==== Knockout round ====
26 October

Semifinals
Tala Al-Mazrou (KSA)	2	3
Viengxila Thammavong (LAO)	1	0
Sarah Al-Jneibi (UAE)	3^{4}	0	0
Supawadee Dunyachit (THA)	3^{1}	1	1

Gold medal match
Tala Al-Mazrou (KSA)	3	1	3
Supawadee Dunyachit (THA)	0	0	1
Bronze medal match
Viengxila Thammavong (LAO)	0	2	2	0	0
Sarah Al-Jneibi (UAE)	1	1	1	1	2
