= Beach volleyball at the 2025 Asian Youth Games =

2025 Asian Youth Games event

- Venue: Sama Bay
- Dates: 20–26 October 2025

Beach Volleyball at the 2025 Asian Youth Games was held from 20 to 26 October 2025 at the Sama Bay, Galali, Bahrain.

== Medalists ==
Event	Gold	Silver	Bronze
Boys	Kazakhstan; Alikhan Agabek; Orazali Sagynysh	Thailand; Kittiwat Suwansirirat; Boonyarit Maneewan	Indonesia; Hafiyan Azam Nuruddin; Fairuz Bayhaqly
Girls	China; Zhuang Ming; Fan Yuhan	Thailand; Natthawiw Khampila; Butsaba Hanmon	Kazakhstan; Gayana Galash; Merey Kozhakhmet

== Medal table ==
Rank	Nation	Gold	Silver	Bronze	Total
1	Kazakhstan (KAZ)	1	0	1	2
2	China (CHN)	1	0	0	1
3	Thailand (THA)	0	2	0	2
4	Indonesia (INA)	0	0	1	1
Totals (4 entries)		2	2	2	6

== Results ==
=== Boys ===
==== Preliminary round ====
===== Group A =====
Pos	Team	Pld	W	L	Pts	SW	SL	SR	SPW	SPL	SPR
1	Agabek–Sagynysh (KAZ)	5	5	0	10	10	2	5.000	229	158	1.449
2	Xin–Ma (CHN)	5	4	1	9	9	3	3.000	222	191	1.162
3	Jahanifar–Marzban (IRI)	5	3	2	8	8	4	2.000	227	178	1.275
4	Al-Jorfi–Al-Awami (KSA)	5	2	3	7	4	7	0.571	169	192	0.880
5	Tan–Adnan (MAS)	5	1	4	6	3	8	0.375	189	205	0.922
6	Anand–Onon (MGL)	5	0	5	5	0	10	0.000	98	210	0.467

Source: Official website

Date		Score		Set 1	Set 2	Set 3
20 Oct	Xin–Ma (CHN)	2–0	Al-Jorfi–Al-Awami (KSA)	21–6	21–19	
20 Oct	Jahanifar–Marzban (IRI)	2–0	Tan–Adnan (MAS)	21–15	21–16	
20 Oct	Agabek–Sagynysh (KAZ)	2–0	Anand–Onon (MGL)	21–8	21–6	
20 Oct	Jahanifar–Marzban (IRI)	2–0	Al-Jorfi–Al-Awami (KSA)	21–12	21–11	
20 Oct	Xin–Ma (CHN)	1–2	Agabek–Sagynysh (KAZ)	21–17	13–21	10–15
20 Oct	Tan–Adnan (MAS)	2–0	Anand–Onon (MGL)	21–11	21–14	
21 Oct	Tan–Adnan (MAS)	0–2	Agabek–Sagynysh (KAZ)	7–21	19–21	
21 Oct	Jahanifar–Marzban (IRI)	1–2	Xin–Ma (CHN)	21–15	19–21	13–15
21 Oct	Al-Jorfi–Al-Awami (KSA)	2–0	Anand–Onon (MGL)	21–6	21–8	
23 Oct	Jahanifar–Marzban (IRI)	1–2	Agabek–Sagynysh (KAZ)	21–14	14–21	13–15
23 Oct	Tan–Adnan (MAS)	1–2	Al-Jorfi–Al-Awami (KSA)	21–14	15–21	16–18
23 Oct	Xin–Ma (CHN)	2–0	Anand–Onon (MGL)	21–9	21–13	
24 Oct	Agabek–Sagynysh (KAZ)	2–0	Al-Jorfi–Al-Awami (KSA)	21–9	21–17	
24 Oct	Xin–Ma (CHN)	2–0	Tan–Adnan (MAS)	22–20	21–18	
24 Oct	Jahanifar–Marzban (IRI)	2–0	Anand–Onon (MGL)	21–14	21–9	

===== Group B =====
Pos	Team	Pld	W	L	Pts	SW	SL	SR	SPW	SPL	SPR
1	Suwansirirat–Maneewan (THA)	5	5	0	10	10	0	MAX	212	138	1.536
2	Nuruddin–Bayhaqly (INA)	5	4	1	9	8	3	2.667	216	177	1.220
3	Maheema–Sandaruwan (SRI)	5	3	2	8	6	6	1.000	189	205	0.922
4	Betioui–Al-Keer (QAT)	5	2	3	7	6	8	0.750	219	217	1.009
5	Warqaa–Yaqoob (BRN)	5	1	4	6	3	9	0.333	186	211	0.882
6	Ali–Rasheed (MDV)	5	0	5	5	3	10	0.300	168	242	0.694

Source: Official website

Date		Score		Set 1	Set 2	Set 3
20 Oct	Suwansirirat–Maneewan (THA)	2–0	Nuruddin–Bayhaqly (INA)	23–21	21–15	
20 Oct	Betioui–Al-Keer (QAT)	2–1	Ali–Rasheed (MDV)	19–21	21–6	15–8
20 Oct	Warqaa–Yaqoob (BRN)	0–2	Maheema–Sandaruwan (SRI)	20–22	7–21	
21 Oct	Warqaa–Yaqoob (BRN)	0–2	Nuruddin–Bayhaqly (INA)	13–21	19–21	
21 Oct	Suwansirirat–Maneewan (THA)	2–0	Betioui–Al-Keer (QAT)	21–13	21–10	
21 Oct	Maheema–Sandaruwan (SRI)	2–1	Ali–Rasheed (MDV)	21–15	12–21	15–7
21 Oct	Warqaa–Yaqoob (BRN)	0–2	Suwansirirat–Maneewan (THA)	17–21	13–21	
21 Oct	Maheema–Sandaruwan (SRI)	2–1	Betioui–Al-Keer (QAT)	21–18	8–21	15–12
21 Oct	Nuruddin–Bayhaqly (INA)	2–0	Ali–Rasheed (MDV)	21–18	21–11	
23 Oct	Suwansirirat–Maneewan (THA)	2–0	Ali–Rasheed (MDV)	21–9	21–12	
23 Oct	Maheema–Sandaruwan (SRI)	0–2	Nuruddin–Bayhaqly (INA)	15–21	11–21	
23 Oct	Warqaa–Yaqoob (BRN)	1–2	Betioui–Al-Keer (QAT)	8–21	21–8	13–15
24 Oct	Betioui–Al-Keer (QAT)	1–2	Nuruddin–Bayhaqly (INA)	15–21	21–18	10–15
24 Oct	Suwansirirat–Maneewan (THA)	2–0	Maheema–Sandaruwan (SRI)	21–13	21–15	
24 Oct	Warqaa–Yaqoob (BRN)	2–1	Ali–Rasheed (MDV)	19–21	21–12	15–7

==== Knockout round ====
Quarterfinals; 25 October
Agabek–Sagynysh (KAZ)	21	21	15
Betioui–Al-Keer (QAT)	11	23	8
Jahanifar–Marzban (IRI)	17	10
Nuruddin–Bayhaqly (INA)	21	21
Xin–Ma (CHN)	21	21
Maheema–Sandaruwan (SRI)	17	17
Al-Jorfi–Al-Awami (KSA)	15	13
Suwansirirat–Maneewan (THA)	21	21

Semifinals; 25 October
Agabek–Sagynysh (KAZ)	17	21	17
Nuruddin–Bayhaqly (INA)	21	18	15
Xin–Ma (CHN)	14	16
Suwansirirat–Maneewan (THA)	21	21

Gold medal match 26 October
Agabek–Sagynysh (KAZ)	21	23
Suwansirirat–Maneewan (THA)	15	21
Bronze medal match
Nuruddin–Bayhaqly (INA)	21	21
Xin–Ma (CHN)	18	11

=== Girls ===
==== Preliminary round ====
===== Group A =====
Pos	Team	Pld	W	L	Pts	SW	SL	SR	SPW	SPL	SPR
1	Zhuang–Fan (CHN)	4	4	0	8	8	0	MAX	168	89	1.888
2	Galash–Kozhakhmet (KAZ)	4	3	1	7	6	3	2.000	158	115	1.374
3	Goh–Qariesya (MAS)	4	2	2	6	5	4	1.250	157	124	1.266
4	Dilrukshi–Adithya (SRI)	4	1	3	5	2	6	0.333	115	134	0.858
5	Fattouh–Jbarah (QAT)	4	0	4	4	0	8	0.000	32	168	0.190

Source: Official website

Date		Score		Set 1	Set 2	Set 3
20 Oct	Galash–Kozhakhmet (KAZ)	2–0	Dilrukshi–Adithya (SRI)	21–6	21–14	
20 Oct	Zhuang–Fan (CHN)	2–0	Goh–Qariesya (MAS)	21–14	21–14	
20 Oct	Galash–Kozhakhmet (KAZ)	2–0	Fattouh–Jbarah (QAT)	21–4	21–4	
20 Oct	Zhuang–Fan (CHN)	2–0	Dilrukshi–Adithya (SRI)	21–11	21–13	
21 Oct	Goh–Qariesya (MAS)	2–0	Fattouh–Jbarah (QAT)	21–3	21–2	
21 Oct	Zhuang–Fan (CHN)	2–0	Galash–Kozhakhmet (KAZ)	21–7	21–19	
23 Oct	Zhuang–Fan (CHN)	2–0	Fattouh–Jbarah (QAT)	21–5	21–6	
23 Oct	Goh–Qariesya (MAS)	2–0	Dilrukshi–Adithya (SRI)	21–14	21–15	
23 Oct	Fattouh–Jbarah (QAT)	0–2	Dilrukshi–Adithya (SRI)	3–21	5–21	
24 Oct	Galash–Kozhakhmet (KAZ)	2–1	Goh–Qariesya (MAS)	12–21	21–15	15–9

===== Group B =====
Pos	Team	Pld	W	L	Pts	SW	SL	SR	SPW	SPL	SPR
1	Khampila–Hanmon (THA)	5	5	0	10	10	0	MAX	210	71	2.958
2	Grahayanti–Youandhita (INA)	5	4	1	9	8	2	4.000	188	118	1.593
3	Nadheem–Sidgee (MDV)	5	2	3	7	5	7	0.714	187	200	0.935
4	Nandin-Erdene–Tselmüün (MGL)	5	2	3	7	5	7	0.714	167	186	0.898
5	Qatabi–Shahaltough (JOR)	5	2	3	7	4	7	0.571	155	201	0.771
6	Majed–Falah (BRN)	5	0	5	5	1	10	0.100	91	222	0.410

Source: Official website

Date		Score		Set 1	Set 2	Set 3
20 Oct	Khampila–Hanmon (THA)	2–0	Qatabi–Shahaltough (JOR)	21–5	21–6	
20 Oct	Majed–Falah (BRN)	0–2	Nadheem–Sidgee (MDV)	9–21	12–21	
20 Oct	Grahayanti–Youandhita (INA)	2–0	Nandin-Erdene–Tselmüün (MGL)	21–7	21–10	
21 Oct	Majed–Falah (BRN)	0–2	Qatabi–Shahaltough (JOR)	7–21	15–21	
21 Oct	Khampila–Hanmon (THA)	2–0	Grahayanti–Youandhita (INA)	21–11	21–9	
21 Oct	Nadheem–Sidgee (MDV)	2–1	Nandin-Erdene–Tselmüün (MGL)	21–17	18–21	15–3
21 Oct	Nadheem–Sidgee (MDV)	0–2	Grahayanti–Youandhita (INA)	8–21	12–21	
21 Oct	Majed–Falah (BRN)	0–2	Khampila–Hanmon (THA)	8–21	1–21	
23 Oct	Qatabi–Shahaltough (JOR)	0–2	Nandin-Erdene–Tselmüün (MGL)	9–21	12–21	
23 Oct	Majed–Falah (BRN)	0–2	Grahayanti–Youandhita (INA)	3–21	9–21	
23 Oct	Nadheem–Sidgee (MDV)	1–2	Qatabi–Shahaltough (JOR)	18–21	21–17	14–16
23 Oct	Khampila–Hanmon (THA)	2–0	Nandin-Erdene–Tselmüün (MGL)	21–7	21–6	
24 Oct	Grahayanti–Youandhita (INA)	2–0	Qatabi–Shahaltough (JOR)	21–16	21–11	
24 Oct	Khampila–Hanmon (THA)	2–0	Nadheem–Sidgee (MDV)	21–7	21–11	
24 Oct	Majed–Falah (BRN)	1–2	Nandin-Erdene–Tselmüün (MGL)	5–21	21–18	1–15

==== Knockout round ====
Quarterfinals; 25 October
Zhuang–Fan (CHN)	21	21
Nandin-Erdene–Tselmüün (MGL)	5	8
Goh–Qariesya (MAS)	21	22
Grahayanti–Youandhita (INA)	16	20
Galash–Kozhakhmet (KAZ)	21	21
Nadheem–Sidgee (MDV)	10	9
Dilrukshi–Adithya (SRI)	15	8
Khampila–Hanmon (THA)	21	21

Semifinals; 25 October
Zhuang–Fan (CHN)	21	21
Goh–Qariesya (MAS)	15	8
Galash–Kozhakhmet (KAZ)	14	19
Khampila–Hanmon (THA)	21	21

Gold medal match 26 October
Zhuang–Fan (CHN)	19	21	16
Khampila–Hanmon (THA)	21	12	14
Bronze medal match
Goh–Qariesya (MAS)	21	20	12
Galash–Kozhakhmet (KAZ)	19	22	15
