= Pencak silat at the 2025 Asian Youth Games =

2025 Asian Youth Games competition

- Venue: Exhibition World Bahrain
- Dates: 19–20 October 2025

Pencak silat at the 2025 Asian Youth Games was held in Sakhir, Bahrain from 19 to 20 October 2025 at the Exhibition World Bahrain. It was the debuting appearance of the sport.

== Medalists ==
Event	Gold	Silver	Bronze
Boys' class D 51–55 kg	Furgon Habil Winata; Indonesia	Qassim Abdulla; Bahrain	Phouk Daniel; Cambodia
Boys' class D 51–55 kg	Furgon Habil Winata; Indonesia	Qassim Abdulla; Bahrain	None awarded
Boys' class F 59−63 kg	Nurislom Ruziboev; Uzbekistan	Temir Bikboev; Kyrgyzstan	Raqib Darwisy; Malaysia
Boys' class F 59−63 kg	Nurislom Ruziboev; Uzbekistan	Temir Bikboev; Kyrgyzstan	Alireza Mortazi; Iran
Girls' class D 51–55 kg	Kram Airam Carpio; Philippines	Qiken Dwi Tata Olifia; Indonesia	Feruza Bozorova; Uzbekistan
Girls' class D 51–55 kg	Kram Airam Carpio; Philippines	Qiken Dwi Tata Olifia; Indonesia	Aliyam Azizova; Kazakhstan

== Medal table ==
Rank	Nation	Gold	Silver	Bronze	Total
1	Indonesia (INA)	1	1	0	2
2	Uzbekistan (UZB)	1	0	1	2
3	Philippines (PHI)	1	0	0	1
4	Bahrain (BRN)	0	1	0	1
4	Kyrgyzstan (KGZ)	0	1	0	1
6	Cambodia (CAM)	0	0	1	1
6	Iran (IRI)	0	0	1	1
6	Kazakhstan (KAZ)	0	0	1	1
6	Malaysia (MAS)	0	0	1	1
Totals (9 entries)		3	3	5	11

== Results ==
=== Boys' 55 kg ===
Quarterfinals; 19 October
Furgon Habil Winata (INA)	74
Abdurakhman Abzhanov (KAZ)	30
Abdullah Zaheer (PAK)	WO
Firdavs Bakhtibekzoda (TJK)	WO

Semifinals; 20 October
Furgon Habil Winata (INA)	51
Phouk Daniel (CAM)	1
Bye
Qassim Abdulla (BRN)

Final; 20 October
Furgon Habil Winata (INA)	81
Qassim Abdulla (BRN)	10

=== Boys' 63 kg ===
Quarterfinals; 19 October		Semifinals; 20 October		Final; 20 October
Asil Kuntama (THA)	42
Nurislom Ruziboev (UZB)	54	Nurislom Ruziboev (UZB)	DQ
Raqib Darwisy (MAS)	40	Raqib Darwisy (MAS)
Jelou Eluna (PHI)	13			Nurislom Ruziboev (UZB)	46
Jassim Al-Sabaie (BRN)	3			Temir Bikboev (KGZ)	16
Alireza Mortazi (IRI)	46	Alireza Mortazi (IRI)	4
Temir Bikboev (KGZ)	29	Temir Bikboev (KGZ)	23
Leikhram Thoithoiba (IND)	15

=== Girls' 55 kg ===
Round of 16; 19 October
Feruza Bozorova (UZB)	55
Nur Hanifah Qisya Hanis (SGP)	18
Kram Airam Carpio (PHI)	36
Nazanin Kolasangiani (IRI)	22
Det Sreyyal (CAM)	WO
Umme Nabiha Khan (PAK)

Quarterfinals; 19 October
Bannaporn Kantangkul (THA)	32
Qiken Dwi Tata Olifia (INA)	40
Feruza Bozorova (UZB)	DQ
Noor Wafadina Rasidi (MAS)
Kram Airam Carpio (PHI)	83
Sakshi Thakur (IND)	17
Det Sreyyal (CAM)
Aliyam Azizova (KAZ)	DQ

Semifinals; 20 October
Qiken Dwi Tata Olifia (INA)	54
Feruza Bozorova (UZB)	54
Kram Airam Carpio (PHI)	46
Aliyam Azizova (KAZ)	27

Final; 20 October
Qiken Dwi Tata Olifia (INA)	19
Kram Airam Carpio (PHI)	33
