= Golf at the 2025 Asian Youth Games =

- Venue: Bahrain Royal Golf Club
- Dates: 23–25 October 2025

Golf at the 2025 Asian Youth Games was held in Bahrain Royal Golf Club, Al-Mazrowiah, Bahrain between 23 and 25 October 2025.

The event was held over three days with each golfer playing one round (18 holes) per day. There was a cut after the first 36 holes, they were reduced to 30 individuals and 14 teams in the boys' tournament and 24 individuals and 10 teams in the girls' competition.

== Medalists ==
| Event | Gold | Silver | Bronze |
|---|---|---|---|
| Boys' individual | Han Jin; China | Nguyễn Tuấn Anh; Vietnam | Jayawardana Dornan; Indonesia |
| Boys' team | China; Han Jin; Jing Shijun; Yan Jinheng | Vietnam; Đoàn Uy; Nguyễn Tuấn Anh | Indonesia; Theodore Pradjoto Ciloputra; Jayawardana Dornan; William Justin Wijaya |
| Girls' individual | Cui Jinghan; China | Ren Yijia; China | Kaya Daluwatte; Sri Lanka |
| Girls' team | China; Cui Jinghan; Li Menghan; Ren Yijia | Thailand; Kanyarak Pongpithanon; Prim Prachnakorn; Pimpisa Rubrong | Chinese Taipei; Hsieh Ping-hua; Lin Jie-en |

== Medal table ==
| Rank | Nation | Gold | Silver | Bronze | Total |
|---|---|---|---|---|---|
| 1 | China (CHN) | 4 | 1 | 0 | 5 |
| 2 | Vietnam (VIE) | 0 | 2 | 0 | 2 |
| 3 | Thailand (THA) | 0 | 1 | 0 | 1 |
| 4 | Indonesia (INA) | 0 | 0 | 2 | 2 |
| 5 | Chinese Taipei (TPE) | 0 | 0 | 1 | 1 |
| 5 | Sri Lanka (SRI) | 0 | 0 | 1 | 1 |
| Totals (6 entries) | | 4 | 4 | 4 | 12 |

== Results ==
=== Boys' individual ===
23–25 October

| Rank | Athlete | Round | | | Total | To par |
| Rank | Athlete | 1 | 2 | 3 | Total | To par |
|---|---|---|---|---|---|---|
| 1st place, gold medalist(s) | Han Jin (CHN) | 67 | 68 | 69 | 204 | −12 |
| 2nd place, silver medalist(s) | Nguyễn Tuấn Anh (VIE) | 72 | 67 | 66 | 205 | −11 |
| 3rd place, bronze medalist(s) | Jayawardana Dornan (INA) | 69 | 70 | 68 | 207 | −9 |
| 4 | Đoàn Uy (VIE) | 72 | 71 | 70 | 213 | −3 |
| 5 | Jing Shijun (CHN) | 69 | 74 | 72 | 215 | −1 |
| 6 | Wang Yu-chun (TPE) | 69 | 73 | 74 | 216 | E |
| 7 | Reshan Algama (SRI) | 74 | 70 | 73 | 217 | +1 |
| 8 | Andrew Yap (MAS) | 74 | 72 | 72 | 218 | +2 |
| 8 | Yan Jinheng (CHN) | 70 | 78 | 70 | 218 | +2 |
| 8 | Bruce Kwong (SGP) | 76 | 69 | 73 | 218 | +2 |
| 11 | Tian Jun (HKG) | 75 | 74 | 70 | 219 | +3 |
| 11 | Nathan Wong (MAS) | 77 | 68 | 74 | 219 | +3 |
| 13 | Hsieh Cheng-wei (TPE) | 75 | 73 | 72 | 220 | +4 |
| 13 | William Justin Wijaya (INA) | 71 | 74 | 75 | 220 | +4 |
| 15 | Patcharapon Watthanadilokkul (THA) | 78 | 74 | 69 | 221 | +5 |
| 15 | Daniil Sokolov (QAT) | 71 | 75 | 75 | 221 | +5 |
| 17 | Tristan Padilla (PHI) | 78 | 74 | 70 | 222 | +6 |
| 17 | Aiden Roberts (MAS) | 74 | 75 | 73 | 222 | +6 |
| 19 | Shahmeer Maajid (PAK) | 74 | 75 | 74 | 223 | +7 |
| 20 | Salem Al-Abkal (KUW) | 74 | 73 | 77 | 224 | +8 |
| 21 | Anthony Fang (HKG) | 74 | 75 | 76 | 225 | +9 |
| 21 | Theodore Pradjoto Ciloputra (INA) | 73 | 71 | 81 | 225 | +9 |
| 23 | Abdul Moez Khan (PAK) | 74 | 77 | 75 | 226 | +10 |
| 23 | Ribhav Verma (IND) | 75 | 74 | 77 | 226 | +10 |
| 25 | Settawut Kenanan (THA) | 77 | 76 | 75 | 228 | +12 |
| 25 | David Serdenia (PHI) | 72 | 74 | 82 | 228 | +12 |
| 27 | Warut Boonrod (THA) | 76 | 79 | 74 | 229 | +13 |
| 27 | Patrick Tambalque (PHI) | 75 | 76 | 78 | 229 | +13 |
| 29 | Adam Al-Barwani (OMA) | 78 | 72 | 80 | 230 | +14 |
| 30 | Khalid Shah (BRN) | 79 | 79 | 76 | 234 | +18 |
| 31 | Amirzhan Zhylkaidarov (KAZ) | 78 | 78 | 79 | 235 | +19 |
| 32 | Deegayu Weerasinghe (SRI) | 77 | 84 | 75 | 236 | +20 |
| 33 | Mohammad Al-Rawashdeh (JOR) | 89 | 74 | 75 | 238 | +22 |
| 34 | Mohammed Thabet (UAE) | 79 | 77 | 83 | 239 | +23 |
| 35 | Lander Lee (HKG) | 85 | 79 | 78 | 242 | +26 |
| 35 | Jevahn Sathasivam (SRI) | 82 | 84 | 76 | 242 | +26 |
| 37 | Azaan Usman (PAK) | 76 | 82 | 90 | 248 | +32 |
| 38 | Kamil Benrokiya (QAT) | 89 | 80 | 82 | 251 | +35 |
| 38 | Pransh Jagwani (OMA) | 86 | 84 | 81 | 251 | +35 |
| 40 | Adam Al-Mazaydeh (JOR) | 93 | 78 | 81 | 252 | +36 |
| 41 | Abdulrahman Mehaizea (BRN) | 86 | 85 | 83 | 254 | +38 |
| 42 | Yaqoob Rahma (BRN) | 80 | 88 | 87 | 255 | +39 |
| 43 | Saud Al-Gosaibi (KSA) | 77 | 80 | | 157 | +13 |
| 44 | Reuben Thapa (NEP) | 81 | 77 | | 158 | +14 |
| 45 | Awangku Khair Zakwan (BRU) | 81 | 79 | | 160 | +16 |
| 46 | Mahir Sampat (OMA) | 87 | 83 | | 170 | +26 |
| 47 | Soshiant Sadeghi (IRI) | 88 | 88 | | 176 | +32 |
| 48 | Mahmodul Shoruv (BAN) | 89 | 88 | | 177 | +33 |
| 49 | Mohammad Hossain (BAN) | 91 | 89 | | 180 | +36 |
| 50 | Abdulla Salmeen (UAE) | 92 | 93 | | 185 | +41 |
| 51 | Marwan Emadi (UAE) | 95 | 92 | | 187 | +43 |

=== Boys' team ===
23–25 October

| Rank | Team | Round | | | Total | To par |
| Rank | Team | 1 | 2 | 3 | Total | To par |
|---|---|---|---|---|---|---|
| 1st place, gold medalist(s) | China (CHN) | 136 | 142 | 139 | 417 | −15 |
| 2nd place, silver medalist(s) | Vietnam (VIE) | 144 | 138 | 136 | 418 | −14 |
| 3rd place, bronze medalist(s) | Indonesia (INA) | 140 | 141 | 143 | 424 | −8 |
| 4 | Malaysia (MAS) | 148 | 140 | 145 | 433 | +1 |
| 5 | Chinese Taipei (TPE) | 144 | 146 | 146 | 436 | +4 |
| 6 | Philippines (PHI) | 147 | 148 | 148 | 443 | +11 |
| 7 | Hong Kong (HKG) | 149 | 149 | 146 | 444 | +12 |
| 8 | Thailand (THA) | 153 | 150 | 143 | 446 | +14 |
| 9 | Pakistan (PAK) | 148 | 152 | 149 | 449 | +17 |
| 10 | Sri Lanka (SRI) | 151 | 154 | 148 | 453 | +21 |
| 11 | Qatar (QAT) | 160 | 155 | 157 | 472 | +40 |
| 12 | Oman (OMA) | 164 | 155 | 161 | 480 | +48 |
| 13 | Bahrain (BRN) | 159 | 164 | 159 | 482 | +50 |
| 14 | Jordan (JOR) | 182 | 152 | 156 | 490 | +58 |
| 15 | United Arab Emirates (UAE) | 171 | 169 | | 340 | +52 |
| 16 | Bangladesh (BAN) | 180 | 177 | | 357 | +69 |

=== Girls' individual ===
23–25 October

| Rank | Athlete | Round | | | Total | To par |
| Rank | Athlete | 1 | 2 | 3 | Total | To par |
|---|---|---|---|---|---|---|
| 1st place, gold medalist(s) | Cui Jinghan (CHN) | 65 | 68 | 62 | 195 | −21 |
| 2nd place, silver medalist(s) | Ren Yijia (CHN) | 72 | 61 | 65 | 198 | −18 |
| 3 | Li Menghan (CHN) | 65 | 67 | 68 | 200 | −16 |
| 3rd place, bronze medalist(s) | Kaya Daluwatte (SRI) | 69 | 64 | 69 | 202 | −14 |
| 5 | Lin Jie-en (TPE) | 67 | 68 | 68 | 203 | −13 |
| 6 | Guo Jun Xi (SGP) | 66 | 67 | 71 | 204 | −12 |
| 7 | Kanyarak Pongpithanon (THA) | 71 | 69 | 65 | 205 | −11 |
| 7 | Pimpisa Rubrong (THA) | 68 | 70 | 67 | 205 | −11 |
| 7 | Prim Prachnakorn (THA) | 68 | 67 | 70 | 205 | −11 |
| 10 | Lê Chúc An (VIE) | 67 | 72 | 68 | 207 | −9 |
| 10 | Hsieh Ping-hua (TPE) | 68 | 70 | 69 | 207 | −9 |
| 12 | Elin Wang (HKG) | 70 | 72 | 67 | 209 | −7 |
| 13 | Eliana Saga (PHI) | 70 | 70 | 70 | 210 | −6 |
| 13 | Mannat Brar (IND) | 66 | 74 | 70 | 210 | −6 |
| 15 | Zara Anand (IND) | 70 | 70 | 74 | 214 | −2 |
| 16 | Saanvi Somu (IND) | 73 | 72 | 70 | 215 | −1 |
| 17 | Crista Miñoza (PHI) | 72 | 73 | 73 | 218 | +2 |
| 18 | Nguyễn Vũ Hoàng Anh (VIE) | 74 | 73 | 72 | 219 | +3 |
| 18 | Leung Hei Tung (HKG) | 73 | 73 | 73 | 219 | +3 |
| 18 | Aasiya Saleem (UAE) | 72 | 74 | 73 | 219 | +3 |
| 21 | Zoie Chan (HKG) | 73 | 76 | 73 | 222 | +6 |
| 22 | Bushra Fatima (PAK) | 73 | 78 | 72 | 223 | +7 |
| 22 | Anca Mateiu (UAE) | 75 | 76 | 72 | 223 | +7 |
| 24 | Nur Batrisyia Balqis (MAS) | 73 | 75 | 76 | 224 | +8 |
| 25 | Sara Abubaker (UAE) | 72 | 81 | 72 | 225 | +9 |
| 26 | Nur Diana Syafiqah (MAS) | 77 | 74 | 75 | 226 | +10 |
| 27 | Precious Zaragosa (PHI) | 80 | 76 | 79 | 235 | +19 |
| 28 | Sara Amin Khan (PAK) | 81 | 81 | 84 | 246 | +30 |
| 29 | Lara El-Bakhour (LBN) | 78 | 77 | | 155 | +11 |
| 30 | Islamiya Abeldi (KAZ) | 81 | 75 | | 156 | +12 |
| — | Amina Tiwana (PAK) | 91 | DNS | | DNF | |

- Kaya Daluwatte was awarded bronze because of no three-medal sweep per country rule.

=== Girls' team ===
23–25 October

| Rank | Team | Round | | | Total | To par |
| Rank | Team | 1 | 2 | 3 | Total | To par |
|---|---|---|---|---|---|---|
| 1st place, gold medalist(s) | China (CHN) | 130 | 128 | 127 | 385 | −47 |
| 2nd place, silver medalist(s) | Thailand (THA) | 136 | 136 | 132 | 404 | −28 |
| 3rd place, bronze medalist(s) | Chinese Taipei (TPE) | 135 | 138 | 137 | 410 | −22 |
| 4 | India (IND) | 136 | 142 | 140 | 418 | −14 |
| 5 | Vietnam (VIE) | 141 | 145 | 140 | 426 | −6 |
| 6 | Hong Kong (HKG) | 143 | 145 | 140 | 428 | −4 |
| 6 | Philippines (PHI) | 142 | 143 | 143 | 428 | −4 |
| 8 | United Arab Emirates (UAE) | 144 | 150 | 144 | 438 | +6 |
| 9 | Malaysia (MAS) | 150 | 149 | 151 | 450 | +18 |
| 10 | Pakistan (PAK) | 154 | 159 | 156 | 469 | +37 |
