= Swimming at the 2025 Asian Youth Games =

- Venue: Khalifa Sports City Swimming Pool
- Dates: 27–30 October 2025

Swimming at the 2025 Asian Youth Games was held in Isa Town, Bahrain from 27 to 30 October 2025 at the Khalifa Sport City.

== Medalists ==
=== Boys ===
Event	Gold		Silver		Bronze	
50 m freestyle	He Yushuguang; China	22.88	Tedd Chan; Singapore	23.39	Hussein Shawky; United Arab Emirates	23.43
100 m freestyle	He Yushuguang; China	50.20	Lee Han; Chinese Taipei	51.41	Jo Yong-joon; South Korea	51.46
200 m freestyle	Ko Seung-woo; South Korea	1:50.08	He Yushuguang; China	1:50.19	Fedor Didenko; Kazakhstan	1:52.99
400 m freestyle	Ko Seung-woo; South Korea	3:53.26	Zhu Linze; China	3:58.50	Su Bo-ling; Chinese Taipei	3:58.75
50 m backstroke	Tedd Chan; Singapore	25.79	Enkhtöriin Erkhes; Mongolia	25.98	Chang Kai-yueh; Chinese Taipei	26.17
100 m backstroke	Alexandr Rumynskiy; Kazakhstan	56.44	Ji Shiqi; China	56.56	Chang Kai-yueh; Chinese Taipei	56.78
200 m backstroke	Huang Yu-teng; Chinese Taipei	2:01.96	Ji Shiqi; China	2:02.57	Alexandr Rumynskiy; Kazakhstan	2:03.97
50 m breaststroke	Tsui Yik Ki; Hong Kong	28.24	Zavv Lee; Singapore	28.53	Hyun Jun; South Korea	29.01
100 m breaststroke	Tsui Yik Ki; Hong Kong	1:02.09	Mok Long Sum; Hong Kong	1:03.38	Hyun Jun; South Korea	1:04.12
200 m breaststroke	Luo Yiming; China	2:17.00	Wu Yulun; Hong Kong	2:17.92	Muhammadismail Rahmonov; Uzbekistan	2:19.04
50 m butterfly	Hussein Shawky; United Arab Emirates	24.73	James Lau; Hong Kong	24.97	Wu Jhao-ci; Chinese Taipei	25.05
100 m butterfly	Mohammad Mehdi Gholami; Iran	54.75	Jamesray Ajido; Philippines	55.11	James Lau; Hong Kong	55.23
200 m butterfly	Mohammad Mehdi Gholami; Iran	2:01.75	Tirthank Pegu; India	2:02.56	Wang Yi Shun; Hong Kong	2:03.45
200 m individual medley	Lee In-seo; South Korea	2:06.49	Reagan Cheng; Singapore	2:06.66	Lu Yichen; China	2:07.04
4 × 100 m freestyle relay	South Korea; Jo Yong-joon; Song Won-jun; Ko Seung-woo; Lee Ji-hoo; Lee In-seo	3:24.89	Indonesia; Reynard Delian Purwanto; Kevin Erlangga Prayitno; Mochammad Akbar Putra Taufik; Samuel Maxson Septionus	3:27.41	China; Zhu Linze; Lü Sibo; Ji Shiqi; He Yushuguang; Lu Yichen; Luo Yiming; Zhang Jiaheng	3:27.46
4 × 100 m medley relay	Hong Kong; Yu Chi Lung; Tsui Yik Ki; James Lau; Wang Yi Shun; Chung Hei Chit	3:48.83	Kazakhstan; Alexandr Rumynskiy; Anatoliy Rudenko; Alikhan Kutlumurat; Fedor Didenko	3:48.91	South Korea; Park Ji-hwan; Hyun Jun; Lee In-seo; Jo Yong-joon; Ko Seung-woo	3:48.96

=== Girls ===
Event	Gold		Silver		Bronze	
50 m freestyle	Li Sum Yiu; Hong Kong	25.59	Zhang Zhiyu; China	25.69	Gilaine Ma; Hong Kong	25.77
100 m freestyle	Li Sum Yiu; Hong Kong	55.72	Gilaine Ma; Hong Kong	56.33	Zhang Zhiyu; China	56.46
200 m freestyle	Gilaine Ma; Hong Kong	2:00.98	Chu Zihai; China	2:01.06	Yang Fuzhen; China	2:01.95
400 m freestyle	Yang Fuzhen; China	4:15.47	Gilaine Ma; Hong Kong	4:16.54	Wang Ziyu; China	4:16.95
50 m backstroke	Sun Mingxia; China	28.65	Ashley Chan; Hong Kong	29.34	Chelsea Alexandra; Indonesia	29.58
50 m backstroke	Sun Mingxia; China	28.65	Ashley Chan; Hong Kong	29.34	Chen Yihan; China	29.58
100 m backstroke	Sun Mingxia; China	1:00.63	Adelia Chantika Aulia; Indonesia	1:03.94	Sun Mingyang; China	1:04.01
200 m backstroke	Sun Mingxia; China	2:08.61	Sun Mingyang; China	2:15.55	Chao Jie-han; Chinese Taipei	2:18.58
50 m breaststroke	Man Wui Kiu; Hong Kong	32.02	Claire Cheung; Hong Kong	32.36	Natthakitta Leekitchakorn; Thailand	32.45
100 m breaststroke	Man Wui Kiu; Hong Kong	1:10.51	Claire Cheung; Hong Kong	1:11.30	Chen Zidian; China	1:11.66
200 m breaststroke	Chelsie Lam; Hong Kong	2:31.63	Chen Zidian; China	2:32.85	Man Wui Kiu; Hong Kong	2:33.98
50 m butterfly	Li Sum Yiu; Hong Kong	27.55	Kim Zin-na; South Korea	27.70	Nutthanicha Loehajaru; Thailand	27.74
100 m butterfly	Li Siyao; China	1:00.51	Shou Yutong; China	1:00.67	Megan Yo; Singapore	1:00.71
200 m butterfly	Shou Yutong; China	2:11.63	Li Siyao; China	2:13.48	Michelle Surjadi Fang; Indonesia	2:15.13
200 m individual medley	Chen Yihan; China	2:16.99	Man Wui Kiu; Hong Kong	2:17.94	Wang Xintong; Hong Kong	2:18.15
4 × 100 m freestyle relay	Hong Kong; Li Sum Yiu; Chelsie Lam; Man Wui Kiu; Gilaine Ma; Mya Lynn Mathis; Wang Xintong	3:45.60	China; Zhang Zhiyu; Li Siyao; Chu Zihai; Yang Fuzhen; Wang Ziyu; Shou Yutong; Chen Yihan; Chen Zidian	3:46.50	Indonesia; Yoshie Honda; Natasha Angelina Oeoen; Chelsea Alexandra; Adelia Chantika Aulia	3:53.59
4 × 100 m medley relay	China; Sun Mingxia; Chen Zidian; Li Siyao; Yang Fuzhen; Sun Mingyang; Shou Yutong; Chu Zihai	4:09.52	Hong Kong; Ashley Chan; Man Wui Kiu; Mya Lynn Mathis; Li Sum Yiu; Claire Cheung; Wang Xintong	4:09.76	Thailand; Kanistha Tungnapakorn; Natthakitta Leekitchakorn; Nutthanicha Loehajaru; Maria Nedelko; Pitpathu Suksee; Varissara Nopthong	4:18.92

=== Mixed ===
Event	Gold		Silver		Bronze	
4 × 100 m freestyle relay	China; Ji Shiqi; He Yushuguang; Zhang Zhiyu; Yang Fuzhen; Sun Mingxia; Chu Zihai	3:33.02	Hong Kong; Yu Chi Lung; Wang Yi Shun; Gilaine Ma; Li Sum Yiu; Mok Long Sum	3:34.06	Thailand; Nutthanicha Loehajaru; Suphakphong Nuntapiyawan; Skye Sharples; Maria Nedelko; Supphakorn Jaikla	3:37.56
4 × 100 m medley relay	China; Sun Mingxia; Luo Yiming; Li Siyao; He Yushuguang; Ji Shiqi; Chen Zidian; Shou Yutong; Zhu Linze	3:55.47	Hong Kong; Ashley Chan; Tsui Yik Ki; James Lau; Li Sum Yiu; Chelsie Lam	3:55.78	Thailand; Thanapat Pinsanoa; Pattaraphum Khamsaard; Nutthanicha Loehajaru; Maria Nedelko; Naracha Khumnon; Varissara Nopthong	4:03.39

== Medal table ==
Rank	Nation	Gold	Silver	Bronze	Total
1	China (CHN)	13	11	8	32
2	Hong Kong (HKG)	11	12	5	28
3	South Korea (KOR)	4	1	4	9
4	Iran (IRI)	2	0	0	2
5	Singapore (SGP)	1	3	1	5
6	Chinese Taipei (TPE)	1	1	5	7
7	Kazakhstan (KAZ)	1	1	2	4
8	United Arab Emirates (UAE)	1	0	1	2
9	Indonesia (INA)	0	2	3	5
10	India (IND)	0	1	0	1
10	Mongolia (MGL)	0	1	0	1
10	Philippines (PHI)	0	1	0	1
13	Thailand (THA)	0	0	5	5
14	Uzbekistan (UZB)	0	0	1	1
Totals (14 entries)		34	34	35	103

== Results ==
=== Boys ===
==== 50 m freestyle ====
27 October

Rank	Athlete	Heats	Final
1st place, gold medalist(s)	He Yushuguang (CHN)	23.28	22.88
2nd place, silver medalist(s)	Tedd Chan (SGP)	23.84	23.39
3rd place, bronze medalist(s)	Hussein Shawky (UAE)	23.45	23.43
4	Samuel Maxson Septionus (INA)	23.25	23.47
5	Nitishsai Harinath (IND)	23.71	23.72
6	Lee Han (TPE)	23.79	23.75
7	Yu Chi Lung (HKG)	23.73	23.83
8	Kevin Erlangga Prayitno (INA)	23.82	24.02
9	Muhammadsodik Makhsudov (UZB)	23.93	
10	Zhu Linze (CHN)	23.95	
11	Song Won-jun (KOR)	24.04	
12	Jo Yong-joon (KOR)	24.05	
13	Jirapat Chayangsu (THA)	24.15	
14	Hee Kejun (SGP)	24.24	
15	Danial Jahangiri (IRI)	24.36	
15	Natthapat Pinsanoa (THA)	24.36	
17	Lee E-An (MAS)	24.38	
18	Alikhan Kutlumurat (KAZ)	24.41	
18	Huang Hao (TPE)	24.41	
20	Yegor Demkov (KAZ)	24.43	
21	Loo Cheng Feng (MAS)	24.45	
22	Hamad Al-Shehhi (UAE)	24.77	
23	Yashar Soleimani (IRI)	24.78	
23	Syed Daniyal Hatim (PAK)	24.78	
25	Ghaith Al-Faraidy (KSA)	24.80	
26	Alan Muhin (TKM)	24.98	
27	Talal Janahi (BRN)	25.00	
28	Ziad Morsy (QAT)	25.08	
29	Omar Nouh (JOR)	25.11	
30	Lithum de Silva (SRI)	25.20	
31	Enkhbaataryn Ninjin (MGL)	25.21	
32	Pieter van Oosten (CAM)	25.29	
33	Jamesray Ajido (PHI)	25.33	
34	Aryaan Rehman Khawar (PAK)	25.42	
35	Adnanfaras Abusalem (PLE)	25.49	
36	Ali Hussain (BRN)	25.58	
37	Chau Hou Cheng (MAC)	25.78	
38	Mohammed Al-Farsi (OMA)	25.83	
39	Sanzhar Musaev (KGZ)	25.99	
40	Danniel Chan (BRU)	26.12	
41	Humoud Al-Humoud (KUW)	26.18	
42	Dylan Wong (BRU)	26.24	
43	Artur Tsoi (KGZ)	26.30	
44	Ali Al-Busaeed (KSA)	26.31	
45	Fok Cheng Tong (MAC)	26.48	
46	Sok Esarak (CAM)	26.92	
47	Abdul Ajim (BAN)	26.99	
48	Jirasak Khammavongkeo (LAO)	27.20	
49	Thuksey Jigme Wangchuk (BHU)	28.37	
50	Nekruz Shokirov (TJK)	28.47	
51	Sardor Temirov (TJK)	29.25	
52	Abdullah Shumaila (YEM)	29.95	
53	Deonisio Alves (TLS)	32.39	
—	Enkhtöriin Erkhes (MGL)	DNS	

==== 100 m freestyle ====
28 October

Rank	Athlete	Heats	Final
1st place, gold medalist(s)	He Yushuguang (CHN)	51.18	50.20
2nd place, silver medalist(s)	Lee Han (TPE)	51.80	51.41
3rd place, bronze medalist(s)	Jo Yong-joon (KOR)	51.88	51.46
4	Kevin Erlangga Prayitno (INA)	51.74	51.68
5	Lee Ji-hoo (KOR)	51.74	51.76
6	Hussein Shawky (UAE)	52.04	51.86
7	Samuel Maxson Septionus (INA)	51.88	51.88
8	Skye Sharples (THA)	51.90	52.17
9	Danial Jahangiri (IRI)	52.07	
10	Muhammadsodik Makhsudov (UZB)	52.11	
10	Fedor Didenko (KAZ)	52.11	
12	Yu Chi Lung (HKG)	52.31	
13	Zhu Linze (CHN)	52.40	
14	Alikhan Kutlumurat (KAZ)	52.61	
14	Jirapat Chayangsu (THA)	52.61	
16	Loo Cheng Feng (MAS)	53.35	
17	Dhakshan Shashikumar (IND)	53.55	
18	Omar Nouh (JOR)	53.90	
19	Yashar Soleimani (IRI)	53.91	
20	Ziad Morsy (QAT)	54.18	
21	Hamad Al-Shehhi (UAE)	54.19	
22	Zavier Tay (SGP)	54.53	
23	Pieter van Oosten (CAM)	54.54	
24	Jamesray Ajido (PHI)	54.77	
25	Chan Hou Wa (MAC)	54.79	
26	Lithum de Silva (SRI)	54.80	
27	Bunyod Bakhtiyorov (UZB)	54.96	
28	Aslan Adnan (MAS)	55.00	
29	Ghaith Al-Faraidy (KSA)	55.28	
30	Lawrence Lim (SGP)	55.30	
31	Alan Muhin (TKM)	55.63	
32	Talal Janahi (BRN)	56.02	
33	Chau Hou Cheng (MAC)	56.04	
34	Aryaan Rehman Khawar (PAK)	56.15	
35	Enkhbaataryn Ninjin (MGL)	56.17	
36	Sanzhar Musaev (KGZ)	56.33	
37	Humoud Al-Humoud (KUW)	56.43	
38	Ali Al-Bdour (JOR)	56.74	
39	Ali Hussain (BRN)	56.99	
40	Wu Jhao-ci (TPE)	57.21	
41	Artur Tsoi (KGZ)	57.23	
42	Ali Al-Busaeed (KSA)	57.60	
43	Mohammed Al-Farsi (OMA)	57.74	
44	Danniel Chan (BRU)	58.02	
45	Dylan Wong (BRU)	59.04	
46	Thuksey Jigme Wangchuk (BHU)	1:01.38	
47	Jirasak Khammavongkeo (LAO)	1:02.04	
48	Khuyagbaataryn Bayarlakh (MGL)	1:03.42	

==== 200 m freestyle ====
29 October

Rank	Athlete	Heats	Final
1st place, gold medalist(s)	Ko Seung-woo (KOR)	1:53.81	1:50.08
2nd place, silver medalist(s)	He Yushuguang (CHN)	1:54.47	1:50.19
3rd place, bronze medalist(s)	Fedor Didenko (KAZ)	1:54.46	1:52.99
4	Dhakshan Shashikumar (IND)	1:54.44	1:53.09
5	Wang Yi Shun (HKG)	1:54.76	1:53.26
6	Supphakorn Jaikla (THA)	1:54.36	1:53.93
7	Danial Jahangiri (IRI)	1:54.55	1:54.55
8	Yuriy Petrovnin (UZB)	1:55.12	1:56.63
9	Jo Yong-joon (KOR)	1:54.51	
10	Samir Abdujabbarov (UZB)	1:55.41	
11	Lü Sibo (CHN)	1:55.89	
12	Mochammad Akbar Putra Taufik (INA)	1:55.92	
13	Su Bo-ling (TPE)	1:56.26	
14	Soud Al-Enezi (KUW)	1:57.95	
15	Huang Hao (TPE)	1:58.05	
16	Suphakphong Nuntapiyawan (THA)	1:58.22	
17	Reagan Cheng (SGP)	1:58.55	
18	Reynard Delian Purwanto (INA)	1:58.68	
19	Omar Nouh (JOR)	1:59.47	
20	Sanzhar Musaev (KGZ)	2:00.66	
21	Lawrence Lim (SGP)	2:00.94	
22	Lithum de Silva (SRI)	2:01.11	
23	Yashith Wijesundera (SRI)	2:01.23	
24	Aslan Adnan (MAS)	2:01.39	
25	Ghanem Al-Sulhi (KSA)	2:01.77	
25	Ch'ng Saw Huai (MAS)	2:01.77	
27	Alikhan Kutlumurat (KAZ)	2:01.92	
28	Ali Al-Bdour (JOR)	2:02.05	
29	Mateen Sediq (AFG)	2:02.83	
30	Ziad Morsy (QAT)	2:04.06	
31	Khalid Al-Balbisi (KSA)	2:04.50	
32	Adam Theibich (BRN)	2:05.13	
33	Muhammad Dayyan Kashif (PAK)	2:05.20	
34	Pieter van Oosten (CAM)	2:05.41	
35	Ariunsükhiin Amirlangui (MGL)	2:06.87	
36	Daniel Nasredinov (KGZ)	2:08.28	
37	Alan Muhin (TKM)	2:10.53	
38	Mohammed Bucheery (BRN)	2:12.77	
39	Aryaan Rehman Khawar (PAK)	2:15.00	
40	Shaym Hussain Ibrahim (MDV)	2:19.64	

==== 400 m freestyle ====
27 October

Rank	Athlete	Heats	Final
1st place, gold medalist(s)	Ko Seung-woo (KOR)	3:56.66	3:53.26
2nd place, silver medalist(s)	Zhu Linze (CHN)	4:00.60	3:58.50
3rd place, bronze medalist(s)	Su Bo-ling (TPE)	4:01.10	3:58.75
4	Lü Sibo (CHN)	3:59.92	3:58.80
5	Lee Ji-hoo (KOR)	4:00.63	3:59.54
6	Mochammad Akbar Putra Taufik (INA)	4:01.14	4:00.66
7	Dhakshan Shashikumar (IND)	4:03.61	4:00.87
8	Fedor Didenko (KAZ)	4:02.77	4:04.44
9	Danial Jahangiri (IRI)	4:01.94	
10	Yuriy Petrovnin (UZB)	4:05.09	
11	Bunyod Bakhtiyorov (UZB)	4:08.51	
12	Soud Al-Enezi (KUW)	4:09.49	
13	Wang Yi Shun (HKG)	4:09.75	
14	Khomchan Wichachai (THA)	4:11.24	
15	Daniel Nasredinov (KGZ)	4:14.81	
15	Supphakorn Jaikla (THA)	4:14.81	
17	Huang Hao (TPE)	4:16.33	
18	Ghanem Al-Sulhi (KSA)	4:16.41	
19	Hassan Zaid Rajab (KUW)	4:18.19	
20	Sanzhar Musaev (KGZ)	4:18.84	
21	Mateen Sediq (AFG)	4:19.48	
22	Adam Malik (MAS)	4:20.02	
23	Hermann Tang (MAS)	4:21.43	
24	Reynard Delian Purwanto (INA)	4:22.66	
25	Lithum de Silva (SRI)	4:23.05	
26	Ali Al-Bdour (JOR)	4:24.49	
27	Khalid Al-Balbisi (KSA)	4:26.38	
28	Adam Theibich (BRN)	4:30.88	
29	Atharva Singh (NEP)	4:34.10	
30	Ariunsükhiin Amirlangui (MGL)	4:41.51	
31	Mohammed Bucheery (BRN)	4:50.14	

==== 50 m backstroke ====
28 October

Rank	Athlete	Heats	Final
1st place, gold medalist(s)	Tedd Chan (SGP)	25.86	25.79
2nd place, silver medalist(s)	Enkhtöriin Erkhes (MGL)	26.56	25.98
3rd place, bronze medalist(s)	Chang Kai-yueh (TPE)	26.76	26.17
4	Ji Shiqi (CHN)	26.31	26.28
5	Wu Jhao-ci (TPE)	26.83	26.59
6	Reagan Cheng (SGP)	26.83	26.72
7	Mohamad Zubaid (KUW)	26.61	26.78
8	Thanapat Pinsanoa (THA)	26.83	26.86
9	Mohammad Mehdi Gholami (IRI)	27.03	
10	Phurayphatr Srirojanant (THA)	27.10	
11	Haviz Rizal Wibowo (INA)	27.11	
12	Alexandr Rumynskiy (KAZ)	27.18	
13	Suhas Preetham Mylari (IND)	27.49	
14	Parsa Shahshahani (IRI)	27.60	
15	Zhang Jiaheng (CHN)	27.78	
16	Ali Al-Abdulwahab (KSA)	27.85	
17	Park Ji-hwan (KOR)	28.03	
18	Samuel Maxson Septionus (INA)	28.12	
19	Nawaf Al-Dawsari (KSA)	28.26	
20	Eid Ahmed Al-Mujaini (UAE)	28.28	
21	Adeetha Siriwardena (SRI)	28.50	
22	Jasim Al-Harban (BRN)	28.59	
23	Lim Chee Wai (MAS)	28.62	
24	Isa Abdulghafoor (BRN)	29.16	
25	Adnanfaras Abusalem (PLE)	29.25	
26	Lai Bo Zheng (MAS)	29.31	
27	So Chi Hin (MAC)	29.68	
28	Danniel Chan (BRU)	29.77	
29	Mohammed Al-Farsi (OMA)	29.96	
30	Tsogtbaataryn Anar (MGL)	30.88	
31	Zukain Abdulla Haneef (MDV)	31.53	
32	Nekruz Shokirov (TJK)	34.27	

==== 100 m backstroke ====
29 October

Rank	Athlete	Heats	Final
1st place, gold medalist(s)	Alexandr Rumynskiy (KAZ)	57.61	56.44
2nd place, silver medalist(s)	Ji Shiqi (CHN)	57.31	56.56
3rd place, bronze medalist(s)	Chang Kai-yueh (TPE)	57.73	56.78
4	Reagan Cheng (SGP)	57.60	57.12
5	Tedd Chan (SGP)	58.01	57.33
6	Enkhtöriin Erkhes (MGL)	58.01	57.52
7	Mohammad Mehdi Gholami (IRI)	57.72	58.07
8	Parsa Shahshahani (IRI)	58.18	58.46
9	Huang Yu-teng (TPE)	58.30	
10	Zhang Jiaheng (CHN)	58.41	
11	Thanapat Pinsanoa (THA)	58.70	
12	Suhas Preetham Mylari (IND)	59.36	
13	Haviz Rizal Wibowo (INA)	59.63	
14	Phurayphatr Srirojanant (THA)	59.72	
15	Park Ji-hwan (KOR)	59.78	
16	Daniil Chuzhinov (KAZ)	59.88	
17	Chan Hou Wa (MAC)	1:00.64	
17	Samuel Maxson Septionus (INA)	1:00.64	
19	Nathaniel Shu (MAS)	1:01.60	
20	Abdullah Sultan (KUW)	1:01.84	
21	Mohamad Zubaid (KUW)	1:02.16	
22	Nawaf Al-Dawsari (KSA)	1:02.24	
23	Ali Al-Abdulwahab (KSA)	1:02.41	
24	Jasim Al-Harban (BRN)	1:02.43	
25	Eid Ahmed Al-Mujaini (UAE)	1:02.46	
26	Danniel Chan (BRU)	1:02.85	
27	Bunyod Bakhtiyorov (UZB)	1:02.94	
28	Adeetha Siriwardena (SRI)	1:03.60	
29	Lai Bo Zheng (MAS)	1:03.79	
30	Isa Abdulghafoor (BRN)	1:04.16	
31	So Chi Hin (MAC)	1:04.56	
32	Adnanfaras Abusalem (PLE)	1:04.89	
33	Jayden de Silva (SRI)	1:05.82	
34	Mohammed Al-Farsi (OMA)	1:06.45	
35	Tsogtbaataryn Anar (MGL)	1:06.99	
36	Abdul Ajim (BAN)	1:08.97	
37	Zukain Abdulla Haneef (MDV)	1:09.82	
38	Jirasak Khammavongkeo (LAO)	1:10.10	

==== 200 m backstroke ====
27 October

Rank	Athlete	Heats	Final
1st place, gold medalist(s)	Huang Yu-teng (TPE)	2:04.39	2:01.96
2nd place, silver medalist(s)	Ji Shiqi (CHN)	2:07.37	2:02.57
3rd place, bronze medalist(s)	Alexandr Rumynskiy (KAZ)	2:05.78	2:03.97
4	Zhang Jiaheng (CHN)	2:06.46	2:04.54
5	Parsa Shahshahani (IRI)	2:05.50	2:04.82
6	Park Ji-hwan (KOR)	2:06.12	2:05.56
7	Reagan Cheng (SGP)	2:06.35	2:05.61
8	Julian Lee (SGP)	2:06.14	2:06.63
9	Chang Kai-yueh (TPE)	2:08.20	
10	Naracha Khumnon (THA)	2:08.49	
11	Daniil Chuzhinov (KAZ)	2:08.55	
12	Pipatchakant Srangsiri (THA)	2:08.86	
13	Haviz Rizal Wibowo (INA)	2:11.12	
14	Suhas Preetham Mylari (IND)	2:11.30	
15	Abdullah Sultan (KUW)	2:12.37	
16	Danniel Chan (BRU)	2:15.62	
17	Nathaniel Shu (MAS)	2:16.05	
18	Adeetha Siriwardena (SRI)	2:17.48	
19	Kanaan Al-Khatib (KSA)	2:18.69	
20	Aslan Adnan (MAS)	2:21.67	
21	Nawaf Al-Dawsari (KSA)	2:24.66	
22	Artur Tsoi (KGZ)	2:25.61	
23	Eid Ahmed Al-Mujaini (UAE)	2:25.65	
24	So Chi Hin (MAC)	2:25.67	
25	Tsogtbaataryn Anar (MGL)	2:27.09	
26	Hussain Al-Banna (BRN)	2:32.99	
27	Abdulrahman Al-Khaja (BRN)	2:34.77	
28	Zukain Abdulla Haneef (MDV)	2:35.65	

==== 50 m breaststroke ====
30 October

Rank	Athlete	Heats	Final
1st place, gold medalist(s)	Tsui Yik Ki (HKG)	28.06	28.24
2nd place, silver medalist(s)	Zavv Lee (SGP)	28.58	28.53
3rd place, bronze medalist(s)	Hyun Jun (KOR)	28.93	29.01
4	Mok Long Sum (HKG)	29.17	29.03
5	Miron Boldovskii (BRN)	29.17	29.12
6	Alireza Arab (IRI)	29.51	29.49
7	Enkhtöriin Erkhes (MGL)	29.61	30.11
8	Hamza Shalan (QAT)	29.52	30.12
9	Benjamin Tan (SGP)	29.80	
10	Muhammadismail Rahmonov (UZB)	29.86	
11	M. F. Muhammad (SRI)	29.92	
12	Anatoliy Rudenko (KAZ)	29.99	
13	Nitheesh Murugesh Suji (IND)	30.01	
14	Phaak Tumsaroj (THA)	30.02	
15	Emmanuel Loh (MAS)	30.05	
16	Didi June Elbert (INA)	30.25	
17	Luo Yiming (CHN)	30.31	
18	Emad Al-Sibiani (KSA)	30.40	
19	Jirapat Chayangsu (THA)	30.58	
20	Darren Leong (MAS)	30.71	
21	Kevin Erlangga Prayitno (INA)	31.00	
22	Adam Morsy (QAT)	31.04	
23	Tsai Yi-lun (TPE)	31.33	
24	Sok Esarak (CAM)	31.35	
25	Daniil Oginskiy (KGZ)	31.53	
26	Muhammad Dayyan Kashif (PAK)	32.06	
27	Lim Sokvearaksak (CAM)	32.07	
28	Fahad Al-Awiglah (KSA)	32.44	
29	Mikail Azfar Mir (PAK)	32.47	
30	Suhail Al-Hanaee (UAE)	32.53	
31	Fok Cheng Tong (MAC)	33.10	
32	Dylan Wong (BRU)	33.13	
33	Zahar Gnatyuk (TKM)	35.11	
34	Izyan Nazim (MDV)	35.43	
35	Nekruz Shokirov (TJK)	37.73	
36	Hussain Ali (BRN)	38.07	
37	Abdullah Shumaila (YEM)	39.28	
38	Deonisio Alves (TLS)	42.70	
—	Looth Mohamed Hussain (MDV)	DNS	
—	Enkhmendiin Enkhmend (MGL)	DNS	

==== 100 m breaststroke ====
29 October

Rank	Athlete	Heats	Final
1st place, gold medalist(s)	Tsui Yik Ki (HKG)	1:03.65	1:02.09
2nd place, silver medalist(s)	Mok Long Sum (HKG)	1:03.52	1:03.38
3rd place, bronze medalist(s)	Hyun Jun (KOR)	1:04.91	1:04.12
4	Muhammadismail Rahmonov (UZB)	1:04.64	1:04.23
5	Luo Yiming (CHN)	1:05.28	1:04.32
6	Enkhmendiin Enkhmend (MGL)	1:04.77	1:05.15
7	Miron Boldovskii (BRN)	1:05.25	1:05.55
8	Didi June Elbert (INA)	1:05.47	1:05.74
9	Alireza Arab (IRI)	1:05.49	
10	Ho Chong Yan (SGP)	1:05.52	
11	Hamza Shalan (QAT)	1:05.66	
12	Emad Al-Sibiani (KSA)	1:05.77	
13	Pattaraphum Khamsaard (THA)	1:05.91	
14	Anatoliy Rudenko (KAZ)	1:06.05	
15	Benjamin Tan (SGP)	1:06.11	
16	Emmanuel Loh (MAS)	1:06.19	
17	M. F. Muhammad (SRI)	1:06.21	
18	Paripat Pimprae (THA)	1:06.22	
19	Adam Morsy (QAT)	1:07.23	
20	Brandon Yeoh (MAS)	1:07.53	
21	Fahad Al-Awiglah (KSA)	1:09.02	
22	Daniil Oginskiy (KGZ)	1:09.53	
23	Sok Esarak (CAM)	1:09.64	
24	Lim Sokvearaksak (CAM)	1:09.78	
25	Tsai Yi-lun (TPE)	1:10.21	
26	Muhammad Dayyan Kashif (PAK)	1:10.92	
27	Mikail Azfar Mir (PAK)	1:11.79	
28	Suhail Al-Hanaee (UAE)	1:12.70	
29	Hassan Zaid Rajab (KUW)	1:12.78	
30	Faris Al-Haddad (BRN)	1:14.06	
31	Fok Cheng Tong (MAC)	1:14.11	
32	Mohammad Ashkanani (KUW)	1:14.58	
33	Ariunsükhiin Amirlangui (MGL)	1:14.96	
34	Dylan Wong (BRU)	1:15.54	
35	Izyan Nazim (MDV)	1:17.87	
36	Zahar Gnatyuk (TKM)	1:18.64	
—	Looth Mohamed Hussain (MDV)	DNS	

==== 200 m breaststroke ====
28 October

Rank	Athlete	Heats	Final
1st place, gold medalist(s)	Luo Yiming (CHN)	2:21.16	2:17.00
2nd place, silver medalist(s)	Wu Yulun (HKG)	2:19.04	2:17.92
3rd place, bronze medalist(s)	Muhammadismail Rahmonov (UZB)	2:19.81	2:19.04
4	Mok Long Sum (HKG)	2:21.13	2:19.43
5	Anatoliy Rudenko (KAZ)	2:21.23	2:19.94
6	Emad Al-Sibiani (KSA)	2:22.05	2:23.42
7	Ho Chong Yan (SGP)	2:24.07	2:23.81
8	Enkhmendiin Enkhmend (MGL)	2:23.63	2:25.81
9	Paripat Pimprae (THA)	2:24.30	
10	Pattaraphum Khamsaard (THA)	2:24.60	
11	Sophocles Ng (MAS)	2:25.20	
12	Hyun Jun (KOR)	2:25.30	
13	Fahad Al-Awiglah (KSA)	2:25.62	
14	Alireza Arab (IRI)	2:25.70	
15	Hamza Shalan (QAT)	2:25.91	
16	Benjamin Tan (SGP)	2:27.08	
17	Daniil Oginskiy (KGZ)	2:27.77	
18	Adam Morsy (QAT)	2:27.78	
19	Didi June Elbert (INA)	2:28.38	
20	Daniil Chuzhinov (KAZ)	2:28.43	
21	Brandon Yeoh (MAS)	2:28.84	
22	Lim Sokvearaksak (CAM)	2:34.15	
23	Muhammad Dayyan Kashif (PAK)	2:36.39	
24	Hassan Zaid Rajab (KUW)	2:37.38	
25	Mikail Azfar Mir (PAK)	2:38.78	
26	Suhail Al-Hanaee (UAE)	2:39.95	
27	Looth Mohamed Hussain (MDV)	2:41.02	
28	Sok Esarak (CAM)	2:41.16	
29	Zahar Gnatyuk (TKM)	2:46.46	
30	Faris Al-Haddad (BRN)	2:46.79	
31	Abdulla Sahlan (BRN)	2:48.95	
32	Izyan Nazim (MDV)	2:51.10	
33	Batzayaagiin Erkhemzaya (MGL)	3:09.11	
—	M. F. Muhammad (SRI)	DSQ	

==== 50 m butterfly ====
28 October

Rank	Athlete	Heats	Final
1st place, gold medalist(s)	Hussein Shawky (UAE)	25.16	24.73
2nd place, silver medalist(s)	James Lau (HKG)	24.96	24.97
3rd place, bronze medalist(s)	Wu Jhao-ci (TPE)	25.08	25.05
4	Mohamad Zubaid (KUW)	25.33	25.11
5	Mohammad Mehdi Gholami (IRI)	25.39	25.17
5	Mohamed Aziz Ismail (QAT)	25.39	25.17
7	Jamesray Ajido (PHI)	25.38	25.45
8	Yegor Demkov (KAZ)	25.37	25.80
9	Samuel Maxson Septionus (INA)	25.46	
10	Tedd Chan (SGP)	25.58	
11	So Chun Hei (HKG)	25.61	
12	Alikhan Kutlumurat (KAZ)	25.75	
13	Thanapat Pinsanoa (THA)	25.79	
14	Muhammadsodik Makhsudov (UZB)	25.89	
15	Yashar Soleimani (IRI)	25.90	
16	Nitishsai Harinath (IND)	25.91	
17	Syed Daniyal Hatim (PAK)	25.97	
18	Ang Yong Jun (MAS)	25.99	
19	Srangbun Palasri (THA)	26.00	
20	Song Won-jun (KOR)	26.07	
21	Alexander Adrian (INA)	26.12	
22	Aryan Bhattbhatt (IND)	26.25	
23	Zavier Tay (SGP)	26.44	
24	Joshua Lim (MAS)	26.45	
25	Enkhbaataryn Ninjin (MGL)	26.53	
26	Pieter van Oosten (CAM)	26.63	
27	Talal Janahi (BRN)	26.89	
28	Omar Nouh (JOR)	26.93	
29	Jayden de Silva (SRI)	27.10	
30	Tsogtsaikhany Narmandakh (MGL)	27.15	
31	Tsai Yi-lun (TPE)	27.16	
32	Adnanfaras Abusalem (PLE)	27.25	
33	Alan Muhin (TKM)	27.42	
34	Ali Al-Busaeed (KSA)	27.50	
35	Hamad Al-Shehhi (UAE)	27.64	
36	Yashith Wijesundera (SRI)	27.68	
37	Ali Hussain (BRN)	27.76	
38	Muhammad Dayyan Kashif (PAK)	27.81	
39	Humoud Al-Humoud (KUW)	27.97	
40	Jirasak Khammavongkeo (LAO)	28.25	
41	Fok Cheng Tong (MAC)	28.49	
42	Sok Esarak (CAM)	28.53	
43	Adilet Abdykaparov (KGZ)	28.91	
44	Khalid Al-Balbisi (KSA)	28.97	
45	Sardor Temirov (TJK)	29.88	
46	Deonisio Alves (TLS)	36.71	

==== 100 m butterfly ====
27 October

Rank	Athlete	Heats	Final
1st place, gold medalist(s)	Mohammad Mehdi Gholami (IRI)	55.39	54.75
2nd place, silver medalist(s)	Jamesray Ajido (PHI)	56.06	55.11
3rd place, bronze medalist(s)	James Lau (HKG)	55.57	55.23
4	Mohamed Aziz Ismail (QAT)	55.80	55.29
5	Lee In-seo (KOR)	56.01	55.67
6	Alexander Adrian (INA)	56.21	56.17
7	Vedant Tandale (IND)	56.31	56.31
8	Supphakorn Jaikla (THA)	56.53	56.38
9	Dhakshan Shashikumar (IND)	56.77	
10	Chung Hei Chit (HKG)	56.81	
11	Lu Yichen (CHN)	57.08	
12	Ang Yong Jun (MAS)	57.38	
13	Samuel Maxson Septionus (INA)	57.50	
14	Syed Daniyal Hatim (PAK)	57.62	
15	Ali Al-Abdulwahab (KSA)	58.37	
16	Yashar Soleimani (IRI)	58.41	
17	Joshua Lim (MAS)	58.82	
18	Emad Al-Sibiani (KSA)	58.85	
19	Samir Abdujabbarov (UZB)	58.91	
20	Yegor Demkov (KAZ)	58.96	
21	Jayden de Silva (SRI)	59.03	
22	Yashith Wijesundera (SRI)	59.04	
23	Tsogtsaikhany Narmandakh (MGL)	59.09	
24	Srangbun Palasri (THA)	59.55	
25	Enkhbaataryn Ninjin (MGL)	1:00.30	
26	Suhail Al-Hanaee (UAE)	1:02.38	
27	Chau Hou Cheng (MAC)	1:02.42	
28	Liao Wu-kuang (TPE)	1:02.76	
29	Adilet Abdykaparov (KGZ)	1:02.83	
30	Omar Al-Khalfan (KUW)	1:03.49	
31	Su Bo-ling (TPE)	1:03.90	
32	Abdulla Sahlan (BRN)	1:04.16	
33	Sanzhar Musaev (KGZ)	1:05.72	
34	Hussain Abbas Abdulla (BRN)	1:13.23	
35	Sardor Temirov (TJK)	1:13.26	
—	Hussein Shawky (UAE)	DNS	

==== 200 m butterfly ====
30 October

Rank	Athlete	Heats	Final
1st place, gold medalist(s)	Mohammad Mehdi Gholami (IRI)	2:03.52	2:01.75
2nd place, silver medalist(s)	Tirthank Pegu (IND)	2:04.58	2:02.56
3rd place, bronze medalist(s)	Wang Yi Shun (HKG)	2:07.69	2:03.45
4	Dhakshan Shashikumar (IND)	2:06.60	2:03.63
5	James Lau (HKG)	2:04.49	2:04.02
6	Lee In-seo (KOR)	2:05.04	2:04.08
7	Alexander Adrian (INA)	2:05.75	2:06.94
8	Mochammad Akbar Putra Taufik (INA)	2:08.13	2:07.12
9	Lawrence Lim (SGP)	2:09.91	
10	Khomchan Wichachai (THA)	2:09.95	
11	Ch'ng Saw Huai (MAS)	2:10.02	
12	Soud Al-Enezi (KUW)	2:10.80	
13	Su Bo-ling (TPE)	2:11.89	
14	Thanapat Pinsanoa (THA)	2:11.91	
15	Julian Lee (SGP)	2:12.91	
16	Mohamed Aziz Ismail (QAT)	2:13.04	
17	Jayden de Silva (SRI)	2:14.06	
18	Syed Daniyal Hatim (PAK)	2:14.51	
19	Ali Al-Abdulwahab (KSA)	2:17.22	
20	Khalid Al-Balbisi (KSA)	2:17.47	
21	Aslan Adnan (MAS)	2:19.13	
22	Liao Wu-kuang (TPE)	2:20.10	
23	Ali Al-Bdour (JOR)	2:24.36	
24	Tsogtsaikhany Narmandakh (MGL)	2:26.84	
25	Ali Hussain (BRN)	2:47.50	
26	Abdulla Al-Shama (BRN)	2:47.87	
—	Khuyagbaataryn Bayarlakh (MGL)	DNS	

==== 200 m individual medley ====
30 October

Rank	Athlete	Heats	Final
1st place, gold medalist(s)	Lee In-seo (KOR)	2:08.44	2:06.49
2nd place, silver medalist(s)	Reagan Cheng (SGP)	2:07.13	2:06.66
3rd place, bronze medalist(s)	Lu Yichen (CHN)	2:07.50	2:07.04
4	Daniil Chuzhinov (KAZ)	2:08.01	2:07.41
5	Skye Sharples (THA)	2:09.59	2:07.48
6	Huang Yu-teng (TPE)	2:11.03	2:08.94
7	Paripat Pimprae (THA)	2:09.76	2:09.55
8	Yuriy Petrovnin (UZB)	2:10.72	2:10.38
9	Samir Abdujabbarov (UZB)	2:11.45	
10	Nitheesh Murugesh Suji (IND)	2:12.94	
11	Enkhmendiin Enkhmend (MGL)	2:13.56	
12	Alexandr Rumynskiy (KAZ)	2:14.54	
13	Aslan Adnan (MAS)	2:14.77	
14	Ngui Jing (MAS)	2:14.93	
15	M. F. Muhammad (SRI)	2:15.08	
16	Huang Hao (TPE)	2:15.58	
17	Reynard Delian Purwanto (INA)	2:15.81	
18	Pieter van Oosten (CAM)	2:17.03	
19	Sanzhar Musaev (KGZ)	2:17.30	
20	Ho Chong Yan (SGP)	2:19.01	
21	Mohammad Ashkanani (KUW)	2:20.02	
22	Omar Al-Khalfan (KUW)	2:22.10	
23	Mikail Azfar Mir (PAK)	2:23.25	
24	Artur Tsoi (KGZ)	2:24.60	
25	Lim Sokvearaksak (CAM)	2:24.90	
26	Jasim Al-Harban (BRN)	2:25.58	
27	Abdulla Sahlan (BRN)	2:29.03	
28	Adeetha Siriwardena (SRI)	2:30.34	
29	Khuyagbaataryn Bayarlakh (MGL)	2:32.95	
30	Makeen Ahmed Shakeeb (MDV)	2:38.20	

==== 4 × 100 m freestyle relay ====
27 October

Rank	Team	Heats	Final
1st place, gold medalist(s)	South Korea (KOR)	3:31.43	3:24.89
2nd place, silver medalist(s)	Indonesia (INA)	3:30.04	3:27.41
3rd place, bronze medalist(s)	China (CHN)	3:32.36	3:27.46
4	Thailand (THA)	3:30.06	3:28.05
5	Chinese Taipei (TPE)	3:31.64	3:29.70
6	Kazakhstan (KAZ)	3:33.47	3:30.12
7	Hong Kong (HKG)	3:32.97	3:31.42
8	Iran (IRI)	3:33.60	3:33.39
9	India (IND)	3:34.68	
10	Singapore (SGP)	3:34.70	
11	Malaysia (MAS)	3:36.00	
12	Uzbekistan (UZB)	3:36.19	
13	Kuwait (KUW)	3:39.75	
14	Saudi Arabia (KSA)	3:41.37	
15	United Arab Emirates (UAE)	3:44.13	
16	Pakistan (PAK)	3:44.30	
17	Bahrain (BRN)	3:45.58	
18	Mongolia (MGL)	3:45.90	
19	Kyrgyzstan (KGZ)	3:49.03	
20	Maldives (MDV)	4:04.40	
—	Qatar (QAT)	DNS	

==== 4 × 100 m medley relay ====
28 October

Rank	Team	Heats	Final
1st place, gold medalist(s)	Hong Kong (HKG)	3:51.02	3:48.83
2nd place, silver medalist(s)	Kazakhstan (KAZ)	3:50.85	3:48.91
3rd place, bronze medalist(s)	South Korea (KOR)	3:54.26	3:48.96
4	Indonesia (INA)	3:53.67	3:50.50
5	Singapore (SGP)	3:53.12	3:50.81
6	Thailand (THA)	3:53.91	3:52.15
7	India (IND)	3:55.21	3:54.43
8	Uzbekistan (UZB)	3:57.78	3:57.72
9	China (CHN)	3:58.71	
10	Malaysia (MAS)	3:59.12	
11	Saudi Arabia (KSA)	4:04.32	
12	Kuwait (KUW)	4:10.62	
13	Pakistan (PAK)	4:14.06	
14	Kyrgyzstan (KGZ)	4:14.79	
15	Mongolia (MGL)	4:16.58	
16	Maldives (MDV)	4:35.84	
—	Bahrain (BRN)	DSQ	
—	Iran (IRI)	DSQ	
—	Chinese Taipei (TPE)	DNS	

=== Girls ===
==== 50 m freestyle ====
27 October

Rank	Athlete	Heats	Final
1st place, gold medalist(s)	Li Sum Yiu (HKG)	25.77	25.59
2nd place, silver medalist(s)	Zhang Zhiyu (CHN)	25.89	25.69
3rd place, bronze medalist(s)	Gilaine Ma (HKG)	26.32	25.77
4	Adelia Chantika Aulia (INA)	26.48	26.43
5	Wen Chu-ting (TPE)	26.57	26.64
6	Kuo Yu-chen (TPE)	26.73	26.67
7	Chen Pui Lam (MAC)	26.73	26.83
8	Yana Lukyanchikova (KAZ)	26.78	26.97
9	Lee Youn-ji (KOR)	26.84	
10	Kannapat Siriruangchanon (THA)	27.04	
10	Seah Shu Hui (MAS)	27.04	
12	Charita Phanindranath (IND)	27.09	
13	Rujula Shashidhara (IND)	27.11	
14	Manee Kaewphichit (THA)	27.32	
15	Khong Zi Lin (MAS)	27.43	
16	Batsanalyn Maral (MGL)	27.47	
17	Adaora Opara (UAE)	27.63	
18	Taiissiya Korotkova (KAZ)	27.70	
19	Sharmeen Mharvin (BRU)	27.77	
20	Natasha Angelina Oeoen (INA)	27.79	
21	Wang Ziyu (CHN)	27.84	
22	Syesha Anthony (SRI)	27.88	
23	Parizod Abdukarimova (UZB)	28.18	
24	Gürdavaagiin Enerelen (MGL)	28.57	
25	Julia Yeo (SGP)	28.61	
26	Jana Al-Tawil (JOR)	28.65	
27	Maya Khalil (PLE)	28.73	
28	Osiyokhon Redjapova (UZB)	28.74	
28	Dora Buklu (BRN)	28.74	
30	Charlotte Ng (SGP)	28.82	
31	Sasha Rajapakse (SRI)	29.02	
32	Lui Ian Hei (MAC)	29.41	
33	Abbey Wong (BRU)	29.48	
34	Sofia Petrashova (KGZ)	29.60	
35	Kheun Chanchakriya (CAM)	29.78	
36	Aarya Maharjan (NEP)	30.01	
37	Lim Sok Kunthakpor (CAM)	30.16	
38	Kseniýa Klimuşkina (TKM)	30.31	
39	Maisha Akter Mim (BAN)	30.81	
40	Shanzay Tabish Bari (PAK)	31.06	
41	Jana Hussain (KUW)	31.10	
42	Saba Sultan (KUW)	31.43	
43	Luna Kamal (BRN)	32.64	
44	Sofiyakhon Gazieva (TJK)	33.87	
45	Safiya Ahmadova (TJK)	38.51	
46	Salena Marlin (TLS)	41.10	
—	Aiymkyz Aidaralieva (KGZ)	DNS	

==== 100 m freestyle ====
28 October

Rank	Athlete	Heats	Final
1st place, gold medalist(s)	Li Sum Yiu (HKG)	57.40	55.72
2nd place, silver medalist(s)	Gilaine Ma (HKG)	57.13	56.33
3rd place, bronze medalist(s)	Zhang Zhiyu (CHN)	57.48	56.46
4	Chu Zihai (CHN)	57.70	56.55
5	Dhinidhi Desinghu (IND)	58.01	57.72
6	Adelia Chantika Aulia (INA)	57.71	57.73
7	Maria Nedelko (THA)	58.28	58.04
8	Lee Youn-ji (KOR)	58.68	58.17
9	Yana Lukyanchikova (KAZ)	58.78	
10	Nutthanicha Loehajaru (THA)	59.26	
11	Kuo Yu-chen (TPE)	59.34	
12	Nadia Lim (MAS)	59.55	
13	Natasha Angelina Oeoen (INA)	59.76	
14	Megan Yo (SGP)	59.80	
15	Aiymkyz Aidaralieva (KGZ)	59.90	
16	Taiissiya Korotkova (KAZ)	59.99	
17	Kaelyn Chee (MAS)	1:00.15	
18	Rujula Shashidhara (IND)	1:00.50	
19	Chen Yu-chieh (TPE)	1:00.77	
20	Sharmeen Mharvin (BRU)	1:01.19	
21	Batsanalyn Maral (MGL)	1:01.23	
22	Osiyokhon Redjapova (UZB)	1:01.26	
23	Lehara Melegoda (SRI)	1:01.97	
24	Vivienne Chew (SGP)	1:02.20	
25	Jana Al-Tawil (JOR)	1:02.35	
26	Syesha Anthony (SRI)	1:02.36	
27	Farah Fares (PLE)	1:03.24	
28	Maya Khalil (PLE)	1:03.36	
29	Lui Ian Hei (MAC)	1:04.53	
30	Sodovjamtsyn Sodonchimeg (MGL)	1:05.13	
31	Lim Sok Kunthakpor (CAM)	1:06.15	
32	Daniya Kazybek (KGZ)	1:06.62	
33	Kseniýa Klimuşkina (TKM)	1:07.07	
34	Maisha Akter Mim (BAN)	1:08.18	
35	Shanzay Tabish Bari (PAK)	1:08.78	
36	Lamar Theibich (BRN)	1:13.99	
37	Sofiyakhon Gazieva (TJK)	1:17.56	

==== 200 m freestyle ====
29 October

Rank	Athlete	Heats	Final
1st place, gold medalist(s)	Gilaine Ma (HKG)	2:05.12	2:00.98
2nd place, silver medalist(s)	Chu Zihai (CHN)	2:05.84	2:01.06
3rd place, bronze medalist(s)	Yang Fuzhen (CHN)	2:06.51	2:01.95
4	Wang Xintong (HKG)	2:06.44	2:03.05
5	Dhinidhi Desinghu (IND)	2:06.02	2:03.40
6	Maria Nedelko (THA)	2:05.92	2:03.43
7	Sarah Sim (SGP)	2:09.07	2:09.04
8	Kuo Yu-chen (TPE)	2:08.85	2:09.71
9	Yoshie Honda (INA)	2:09.76	
10	Aditi Satish Hegde (IND)	2:09.91	
11	Yana Lukyanchikova (KAZ)	2:10.26	
12	Tan Rui Nee (MAS)	2:10.78	
13	Tsai Yung-ling (TPE)	2:10.82	
14	Varissara Nopthong (THA)	2:11.52	
15	Aiymkyz Aidaralieva (KGZ)	2:11.81	
16	Megan Yo (SGP)	2:12.91	
17	Anastassiya Yermakova (KAZ)	2:13.88	
18	Kyla Bulaga (PHI)	2:14.13	
19	Natasha Angelina Oeoen (INA)	2:14.21	
20	Lehara Melegoda (SRI)	2:15.46	
21	Osiyokhon Redjapova (UZB)	2:16.68	
22	Shannon Tan (MAS)	2:16.69	
23	Jana Al-Tawil (JOR)	2:18.60	
24	Julie Hope (SRI)	2:19.20	
25	Sodovjamtsyn Sodonchimeg (MGL)	2:26.18	
26	Saruulyn Misheel (MGL)	2:28.01	
27	Daniya Kazybek (KGZ)	2:31.38	
28	Shanzay Tabish Bari (PAK)	2:33.48	
29	Ayaana Areef (MDV)	2:39.09	
30	Lamar Theibich (BRN)	2:39.46	
—	Adaora Opara (UAE)	DNS	

==== 400 m freestyle ====
27 October

Rank	Athlete	Heats	Final
1st place, gold medalist(s)	Yang Fuzhen (CHN)	4:21.40	4:15.47
2nd place, silver medalist(s)	Gilaine Ma (HKG)	4:20.48	4:16.54
3rd place, bronze medalist(s)	Wang Ziyu (CHN)	4:21.16	4:16.95
4	Maria Nedelko (THA)	4:21.37	4:17.43
5	Dhinidhi Desinghu (IND)	4:31.15	4:21.86
6	Sarah Sim (SGP)	4:30.91	4:31.21
7	Aditi Satish Hegde (IND)	4:29.22	4:32.00
8	Tsai Yung-ling (TPE)	4:30.23	4:34.51
9	Wang Xintong (HKG)	4:31.24	
10	Chereen Ngo (MAS)	4:35.59	
11	Tan Rui Nee (MAS)	4:36.41	
12	Tseng Chia-i (TPE)	4:37.30	
13	Ashley Wong (SGP)	4:37.95	
14	Kyla Bulaga (PHI)	4:38.63	
15	Yoshie Honda (INA)	4:43.31	
16	Anastassiya Yermakova (KAZ)	4:43.73	
17	Lehara Melegoda (SRI)	4:54.83	
18	Julie Hope (SRI)	4:59.11	
19	Ganzorigiin Enerel (MGL)	5:20.98	
20	Daniya Kazybek (KGZ)	5:26.70	
21	Sara Al-Qarooni (BRN)	5:28.24	
22	Ayaana Areef (MDV)	5:29.92	
23	Lamar Theibich (BRN)	5:39.53	
24	Darkhanbaataryn Möngönsar (MGL)	6:35.73	
—	Aiymkyz Aidaralieva (KGZ)	DNS	

==== 50 m backstroke ====
28 October

Rank	Athlete	Heats	Final
1st place, gold medalist(s)	Sun Mingxia (CHN)	29.44	28.65
2nd place, silver medalist(s)	Ashley Chan (HKG)	29.82	29.34
3rd place, bronze medalist(s)	Chelsea Alexandra (INA)	29.78	29.58
3rd place, bronze medalist(s)	Chen Yihan (CHN)	29.90	29.58
5	Wen Chu-ting (TPE)	30.22	29.85
6	Adelia Chantika Aulia (INA)	30.41	30.00
7	Lin Zhi-yan (TPE)	30.52	30.48
8	Darya Chesnokova (KAZ)	30.23	30.61
9	Kannapat Siriruangchanon (THA)	30.61	
10	Parizod Abdukarimova (UZB)	30.73	
11	Chelsie Lam (HKG)	30.76	
12	Vivian Tee (MAS)	30.85	
13	Julia Yeo (SGP)	30.89	
14	Margarita Rayenko (KAZ)	31.03	
15	Kim Dan-a (KOR)	31.05	
16	Sharmeen Mharvin (BRU)	31.09	
17	Wong Un Iao (MAC)	31.16	
18	Sagnika Roy (IND)	31.29	
19	Kanistha Tungnapakorn (THA)	31.38	
20	Vihitha Nayana Loganathan (IND)	31.54	
21	Julie Hope (SRI)	31.66	
22	Charlotte Ng (SGP)	31.71	
23	Kheun Chanchakriya (CAM)	32.00	
24	Amna Thazkiyah Mirsaad (MDV)	32.57	
25	Farah Fares (PLE)	32.71	
26	Joelle Chan (MAS)	32.99	
27	Abbey Wong (BRU)	33.68	
28	Sasha Rajapakse (SRI)	33.97	
29	Lim Sok Kunthakpor (CAM)	34.40	
30	Saruulyn Misheel (MGL)	34.46	
31	Sodovjamtsyn Sodonchimeg (MGL)	35.16	
32	Malaika Linda Imran (MDV)	36.16	
33	Raaqiah Aqeel (PAK)	36.41	
34	Sofiyakhon Gazieva (TJK)	40.95	
35	Lamar Theibich (BRN)	43.47	

==== 100 m backstroke ====
29 October

Rank	Athlete	Heats	Final
1st place, gold medalist(s)	Sun Mingxia (CHN)	1:03.54	1:00.63
2nd place, silver medalist(s)	Adelia Chantika Aulia (INA)	1:05.49	1:03.94
3rd place, bronze medalist(s)	Sun Mingyang (CHN)	1:05.43	1:04.01
4	Ashley Chan (HKG)	1:04.49	1:04.02
5	Lin Zhi-yan (TPE)	1:05.52	1:04.70
6	Wen Chu-ting (TPE)	1:05.94	1:04.77
7	Chelsea Alexandra (INA)	1:05.30	1:05.25
8	Parizod Abdukarimova (UZB)	1:06.16	1:06.45
9	Kim Dan-a (KOR)	1:06.35	
10	Wong Un Iao (MAC)	1:06.36	
11	Vivian Tee (MAS)	1:06.46	
12	Ho Pui Yan (HKG)	1:06.47	
13	Julia Yeo (SGP)	1:06.56	
14	Yelena Savitskaya (KAZ)	1:06.66	
15	Kanistha Tungnapakorn (THA)	1:07.14	
16	Charlotte Ng (SGP)	1:07.25	
17	Kannapat Siriruangchanon (THA)	1:07.27	
18	Margarita Rayenko (KAZ)	1:07.48	
19	Sri Nithya Sagi (IND)	1:08.59	
20	Vihitha Nayana Loganathan (IND)	1:08.69	
21	Sharmeen Mharvin (BRU)	1:09.42	
22	Julie Hope (SRI)	1:09.47	
23	Farah Fares (PLE)	1:09.81	
24	Nadia Lim (MAS)	1:09.88	
25	Kheun Chanchakriya (CAM)	1:11.54	
26	Lim Sok Kunthakpor (CAM)	1:15.66	
27	Saruulyn Misheel (MGL)	1:17.82	
28	Malaika Linda Imran (MDV)	1:18.90	
29	Telmüüniin Namuun (MGL)	1:19.51	
30	Alina Beknazarova (KGZ)	1:20.86	
31	Raaqiah Aqeel (PAK)	1:22.35	
32	Ayaana Areef (MDV)	1:24.33	
33	Lamar Theibich (BRN)	1:30.51	

==== 200 m backstroke ====
27 October

Rank	Athlete	Heats	Final
1st place, gold medalist(s)	Sun Mingxia (CHN)	2:17.53	2:08.61
2nd place, silver medalist(s)	Sun Mingyang (CHN)	2:16.50	2:15.55
3rd place, bronze medalist(s)	Chao Jie-han (TPE)	2:19.66	2:18.58
4	Julia Yeo (SGP)	2:21.43	2:19.19
5	Kim Dan-a (KOR)	2:21.67	2:19.51
6	Adelia Chantika Aulia (INA)	2:19.72	2:20.01
7	Ashley Chan (HKG)	2:19.84	2:20.82
8	Kanistha Tungnapakorn (THA)	2:21.47	2:27.34
9	Lin Zhi-yan (TPE)	2:22.64	
10	Kim Yeon (KOR)	2:22.82	
11	Sri Nithya Sagi (IND)	2:23.59	
12	Yelena Savitskaya (KAZ)	2:23.99	
13	Ho Pui Yan (HKG)	2:24.36	
14	Charlotte Ng (SGP)	2:24.71	
15	Wong Un Iao (MAC)	2:25.25	
16	Vivian Tee (MAS)	2:26.42	
17	Chelsea Alexandra (INA)	2:28.16	
18	Farah Fares (PLE)	2:30.57	
19	Margarita Rayenko (KAZ)	2:32.37	
20	Vihitha Nayana Loganathan (IND)	2:33.00	
21	Joelle Chan (MAS)	2:33.05	
22	Kheun Chanchakriya (CAM)	2:41.54	
23	Amna Thazkiyah Mirsaad (MDV)	2:45.97	
24	Telmüüniin Namuun (MGL)	2:54.58	
25	Malaika Linda Imran (MDV)	2:54.85	
26	Raaqiah Aqeel (PAK)	3:03.75	
27	Darkhanbaataryn Möngönsar (MGL)	3:06.14	

==== 50 m breaststroke ====
30 October

Rank	Athlete	Heats	Final
1st place, gold medalist(s)	Man Wui Kiu (HKG)	32.05	32.02
2nd place, silver medalist(s)	Claire Cheung (HKG)	32.52	32.36
3rd place, bronze medalist(s)	Natthakitta Leekitchakorn (THA)	33.09	32.45
4	Thea Obeid (LBN)	32.51	32.66
5	Chen Pui Lam (MAC)	32.66	32.71
6	Chen Yu-chieh (TPE)	32.37	32.84
7	Pitpathu Suksee (THA)	33.10	33.32
8	Jo Su-a (KOR)	33.36	33.37
9	Chen Zidian (CHN)	33.47	
10	Lee Song-hyun (KOR)	33.64	
11	Khoo Sue Enn (MAS)	34.24	
12	Riannah Coleman (PHI)	34.36	
13	Joy Neo (SGP)	34.71	
14	Lee Yi-ting (TPE)	34.73	
15	Vivienne Chew (SGP)	34.77	
16	Alma Shaat (PLE)	34.85	
17	Batsanalyn Maral (MGL)	34.89	
18	Tara Aloul (JOR)	35.18	
19	Zheng Xiyi (CHN)	35.57	
20	Olivia Seow (MAS)	35.59	
20	Natasha Angelina Oeoen (INA)	35.59	
22	Batchuluuny Nomin (MGL)	35.76	
23	Dora Buklu (BRN)	35.99	
24	Kaylonie Amphonesuh (LAO)	36.06	
25	Maya Khalil (PLE)	36.35	
26	Abbey Wong (BRU)	36.69	
27	Sarah Mohamed (MDV)	37.79	
28	Dalia A'ida Latheef (MDV)	39.42	
29	Luna Kamal (BRN)	40.66	
30	Alina Beknazarova (KGZ)	40.86	
31	Daniya Bhatia (PAK)	42.00	
32	Sofiyakhon Gazieva (TJK)	45.14	
33	Safiya Ahmadova (TJK)	48.63	

==== 100 m breaststroke ====
29 October

Rank	Athlete	Heats	Final
1st place, gold medalist(s)	Man Wui Kiu (HKG)	1:11.30	1:10.51
2nd place, silver medalist(s)	Claire Cheung (HKG)	1:12.43	1:11.30
3rd place, bronze medalist(s)	Chen Zidian (CHN)	1:13.63	1:11.66
4	Chen Pui Lam (MAC)	1:12.85	1:11.75
5	Jo Su-a (KOR)	1:12.74	1:12.34
6	Natthakitta Leekitchakorn (THA)	1:14.11	1:13.61
7	Riannah Coleman (PHI)	1:13.79	1:14.49
8	Thea Obeid (LBN)	1:14.47	1:16.06
9	Lee Yi-ting (TPE)	1:14.61	
10	Joy Neo (SGP)	1:14.65	
11	Lee Song-hyun (KOR)	1:14.66	
12	Prinnapat Sunthornrangsri (THA)	1:14.76	
13	Khoo Sue Enn (MAS)	1:15.41	
14	Alma Shaat (PLE)	1:15.69	
15	Vivienne Chew (SGP)	1:16.18	
15	Chen Yu-chieh (TPE)	1:16.18	
17	Zheng Xiyi (CHN)	1:16.70	
18	Batsanalyn Maral (MGL)	1:17.01	
19	Olivia Seow (MAS)	1:17.44	
20	Tara Aloul (JOR)	1:17.59	
21	Kyla Bulaga (PHI)	1:18.50	
22	Natasha Angelina Oeoen (INA)	1:18.97	
23	Batchuluuny Nomin (MGL)	1:19.96	
24	Kaylonie Amphonesuh (LAO)	1:20.91	
25	Abbey Wong (BRU)	1:21.68	
26	Dora Buklu (BRN)	1:22.58	
27	Sarah Mohamed (MDV)	1:24.76	
28	Dalia A'ida Latheef (MDV)	1:28.21	
29	Alina Beknazarova (KGZ)	1:29.50	
30	Sara Al-Qarooni (BRN)	1:29.89	
31	Daniya Bhatia (PAK)	1:33.92	
32	Safiya Ahmadova (TJK)	1:49.95	

==== 200 m breaststroke ====
28 October

Rank	Athlete	Heats	Final
1st place, gold medalist(s)	Chelsie Lam (HKG)	2:36.69	2:31.63
2nd place, silver medalist(s)	Chen Zidian (CHN)	2:36.27	2:32.85
3rd place, bronze medalist(s)	Man Wui Kiu (HKG)	2:38.04	2:33.98
4	Chen Pui Lam (MAC)	2:40.23	2:36.03
5	Lee Yi-ting (TPE)	2:37.92	2:37.73
6	Joy Neo (SGP)	2:39.60	2:38.30
7	Khoo Sue Enn (MAS)	2:39.32	2:40.30
8	Jo Su-a (KOR)	2:40.47	2:42.46
9	Kyla Bulaga (PHI)	2:40.93	
10	Prinnapat Sunthornrangsri (THA)	2:41.09	
11	Elizabeth Low (SGP)	2:42.34	
12	Riannah Coleman (PHI)	2:42.73	
13	Chao Jie-han (TPE)	2:43.02	
14	Tara Aloul (JOR)	2:44.30	
15	Alma Shaat (PLE)	2:44.79	
16	Natthakitta Leekitchakorn (THA)	2:45.13	
17	Thea Obeid (LBN)	2:45.41	
18	Anastassiya Yermakova (KAZ)	2:46.33	
19	Olivia Seow (MAS)	2:47.70	
20	Kaylonie Amphonesuh (LAO)	2:56.73	
21	Ariunsükhiin Yalguun (MGL)	2:57.39	
22	Batchuluuny Nomin (MGL)	2:58.38	
23	Sarah Mohamed (MDV)	3:03.81	
24	Dalia A'ida Latheef (MDV)	3:14.85	
25	Luna Kamal (BRN)	3:19.59	
—	Zheng Xiyi (CHN)	DNS	

==== 50 m butterfly ====
28 October

Rank	Athlete	Heats	Final
1st place, gold medalist(s)	Li Sum Yiu (HKG)	28.20	27.55
2nd place, silver medalist(s)	Kim Zin-na (KOR)	27.96	27.70
3rd place, bronze medalist(s)	Nutthanicha Loehajaru (THA)	28.27	27.74
4	Megan Yo (SGP)	28.14	27.81
5	Mya Lynn Mathis (HKG)	28.31	27.98
6	Li Siyao (CHN)	28.39	28.39
7	Michelle Surjadi Fang (INA)	28.66	28.45
8	Wichita Ketmanee (THA)	28.84	28.87
9	Wen Chu-ting (TPE)	28.99	
10	Aizhan Turebayeva (KAZ)	29.01	
10	Keira Chew (SGP)	29.01	
12	Mishya Khor (MAS)	29.14	
13	Lin Zhi-yan (TPE)	29.34	
14	Taiissiya Korotkova (KAZ)	29.52	
15	Kaelyn Chee (MAS)	29.84	
16	Syesha Anthony (SRI)	30.42	
17	Temüüjingiin Anungoo (MGL)	30.51	
18	Maya Khalil (PLE)	30.69	
19	Gürdavaagiin Enerelen (MGL)	30.97	
20	Thea Obeid (LBN)	31.06	
21	Kyla Bulaga (PHI)	31.07	
22	Dora Buklu (BRN)	31.37	
23	Jana Al-Tawil (JOR)	31.43	
24	Amna Thazkiyah Mirsaad (MDV)	31.49	
25	Sofia Petrashova (KGZ)	31.57	
26	Sasha Rajapakse (SRI)	31.59	
27	Yip Ka Weng (MAC)	31.76	
28	Kheun Chanchakriya (CAM)	32.03	
29	Kseniýa Klimuşkina (TKM)	32.68	
30	Alina Beknazarova (KGZ)	32.96	
31	Fatima Salman (PAK)	34.25	
32	Sara Al-Qarooni (BRN)	34.29	
33	Jana Hussain (KUW)	34.40	
34	Daniya Bhatia (PAK)	34.46	
35	Sofiyakhon Gazieva (TJK)	40.09	
—	Alma Shaat (PLE)	DSQ	
—	Adaora Opara (UAE)	DNS	

==== 100 m butterfly ====
27 October

Rank	Athlete	Heats	Final
1st place, gold medalist(s)	Li Siyao (CHN)	1:01.56	1:00.51
2nd place, silver medalist(s)	Shou Yutong (CHN)	1:01.20	1:00.67
3rd place, bronze medalist(s)	Megan Yo (SGP)	1:01.19	1:00.71
4	Mya Lynn Mathis (HKG)	1:01.16	1:01.07
5	Nutthanicha Loehajaru (THA)	1:01.86	1:01.52
6	Michelle Surjadi Fang (INA)	1:02.54	1:01.69
7	Varissara Nopthong (THA)	1:02.34	1:02.24
8	Shannon Tan (MAS)	1:02.51	1:03.29
9	Lin Zhi-yan (TPE)	1:03.72	
10	Keira Chew (SGP)	1:03.83	
11	Mishya Khor (MAS)	1:03.91	
12	Aizhan Turebayeva (KAZ)	1:04.22	
13	Kim Zin-na (KOR)	1:04.71	
14	Adaora Opara (UAE)	1:06.37	
15	Kyla Bulaga (PHI)	1:07.28	
16	Riannah Coleman (PHI)	1:07.51	
16	Tara Aloul (JOR)	1:07.51	
18	Tseng Chia-i (TPE)	1:07.73	
19	Temüüjingiin Anungoo (MGL)	1:09.93	
20	Yip Ka Weng (MAC)	1:12.65	
21	Sara Al-Qarooni (BRN)	1:16.12	
22	Ganzorigiin Enerel (MGL)	1:18.30	
23	Fatima Salman (PAK)	1:18.38	
24	Daniya Bhatia (PAK)	1:23.22	

==== 200 m butterfly ====
30 October

Rank	Athlete	Heats	Final
1st place, gold medalist(s)	Shou Yutong (CHN)	2:19.96	2:11.63
2nd place, silver medalist(s)	Li Siyao (CHN)	2:18.39	2:13.48
3rd place, bronze medalist(s)	Michelle Surjadi Fang (INA)	2:15.43	2:15.13
4	Mya Lynn Mathis (HKG)	2:19.09	2:15.39
5	Varissara Nopthong (THA)	2:19.66	2:15.61
6	Shannon Tan (MAS)	2:17.66	2:15.71
7	Heather Teo (SGP)	2:23.07	2:22.57
8	Kyla Bulaga (PHI)	2:22.68	2:25.05
9	Tseng Chia-i (TPE)	2:23.18	
10	Mishya Khor (MAS)	2:24.57	
11	Wichita Ketmanee (THA)	2:30.67	
12	Aizhan Turebayeva (KAZ)	2:35.56	
13	Sara Al-Qarooni (BRN)	3:00.12	
14	Fatima Salman (PAK)	3:09.28	
—	Chao Jie-han (TPE)	DNS	
—	Temüüjingiin Anungoo (MGL)	DNS	

==== 200 m individual medley ====
30 October

Rank	Athlete	Heats	Final
1st place, gold medalist(s)	Chen Yihan (CHN)	2:20.41	2:16.99
2nd place, silver medalist(s)	Man Wui Kiu (HKG)	2:21.49	2:17.94
3rd place, bronze medalist(s)	Wang Xintong (HKG)	2:23.98	2:18.15
4	Chao Jie-han (TPE)	2:22.64	2:21.25
5	Megan Yo (SGP)	2:25.12	2:22.27
6	Tsai Yung-ling (TPE)	2:22.47	2:23.69
7	Anastassiya Yermakova (KAZ)	2:23.33	2:24.35
8	Taiissiya Korotkova (KAZ)	2:26.10	2:25.40
9	Varissara Nopthong (THA)	2:26.13	
10	Kim Yeon (KOR)	2:26.28	
11	Natthakitta Leekitchakorn (THA)	2:26.63	
12	Nadia Lim (MAS)	2:27.45	
13	Tara Aloul (JOR)	2:27.84	
14	Julia Yeo (SGP)	2:29.52	
15	Kyla Bulaga (PHI)	2:29.58	
16	Chereen Ngo (MAS)	2:30.28	
17	Lehara Melegoda (SRI)	2:36.64	
18	Maya Khalil (PLE)	2:40.55	
19	Kaylonie Amphonesuh (LAO)	2:40.57	
20	Sasha Rajapakse (SRI)	2:45.00	
21	Ganzorigiin Enerel (MGL)	2:49.37	
22	Ariunsükhiin Yalguun (MGL)	2:50.99	
23	Fatima Salman (PAK)	2:56.27	
24	Alina Beknazarova (KGZ)	2:56.34	

==== 4 × 100 m freestyle relay ====
27 October

Rank	Team	Heats	Final
1st place, gold medalist(s)	Hong Kong (HKG)	3:54.39	3:45.60
2nd place, silver medalist(s)	China (CHN)	3:54.03	3:46.50
3rd place, bronze medalist(s)	Indonesia (INA)	3:56.80	3:53.59
4	Thailand (THA)	3:56.37	3:55.06
5	Chinese Taipei (TPE)	3:57.31	3:56.34
6	Kazakhstan (KAZ)	3:58.20	3:58.44
7	Malaysia (MAS)	3:57.97	3:59.99
8	India (IND)	4:01.01	4:05.73
9	South Korea (KOR)	4:02.84	
10	Singapore (SGP)	4:05.75	
11	Mongolia (MGL)	4:15.96	
12	Kyrgyzstan (KGZ)	4:22.89	
13	Maldives (MDV)	4:38.07	
14	Bahrain (BRN)	4:45.50	
15	Pakistan (PAK)	4:59.46	

==== 4 × 100 m medley relay ====
28 October

Rank	Team	Heats	Final
1st place, gold medalist(s)	China (CHN)	4:21.69	4:09.52
2nd place, silver medalist(s)	Hong Kong (HKG)	4:15.72	4:09.76
3rd place, bronze medalist(s)	Thailand (THA)	4:25.64	4:18.92
4	Singapore (SGP)	4:23.97	4:20.07
5	Malaysia (MAS)	4:22.19	4:20.96
6	Chinese Taipei (TPE)	4:26.28	4:21.19
7	South Korea (KOR)	4:24.73	4:24.52
8	Indonesia (INA)	4:27.26	4:25.80
9	Kazakhstan (KAZ)	4:27.83	
10	Mongolia (MGL)	4:54.63	
11	Kyrgyzstan (KGZ)	5:11.45	
12	Maldives (MDV)	5:12.09	
13	Pakistan (PAK)	5:34.31	

=== Mixed ===
==== 4 × 100 m freestyle relay ====
30 October

Rank	Team	Heats	Final
1st place, gold medalist(s)	China (CHN)	3:38.56	3:33.02
2nd place, silver medalist(s)	Hong Kong (HKG)	3:41.95	3:34.06
3rd place, bronze medalist(s)	Thailand (THA)	3:42.19	3:37.56
4	Indonesia (INA)	3:42.48	3:39.13
5	South Korea (KOR)	3:42.83	3:39.97
6	Kazakhstan (KAZ)	3:43.40	3:41.57
7	Malaysia (MAS)	3:45.30	3:45.69
—	Chinese Taipei (TPE)	3:42.84	DSQ
9	Uzbekistan (UZB)	3:46.80	
10	Singapore (SGP)	3:48.66	
11	India (IND)	3:49.81	
12	Macau (MAC)	3:52.99	
13	Mongolia (MGL)	3:56.07	
14	Jordan (JOR)	3:57.51	
15	Kyrgyzstan (KGZ)	4:00.80	
16	Cambodia (CAM)	4:02.80	
17	Bahrain (BRN)	4:06.89	
18	Pakistan (PAK)	4:22.15	
19	Maldives (MDV)	4:34.40	

==== 4 × 100 m medley relay ====
29 October

Rank	Team	Heats	Final
1st place, gold medalist(s)	China (CHN)	4:01.32	3:55.47
2nd place, silver medalist(s)	Hong Kong (HKG)	4:01.82	3:55.78
3rd place, bronze medalist(s)	Thailand (THA)	4:06.87	4:03.39
4	Chinese Taipei (TPE)	4:05.71	4:03.44
5	Indonesia (INA)	4:09.54	4:03.82
6	Singapore (SGP)	4:06.10	4:03.95
7	Kazakhstan (KAZ)	4:05.64	4:04.04
—	South Korea (KOR)	4:06.95	DSQ
9	Malaysia (MAS)	4:09.62	
10	Uzbekistan (UZB)	4:11.39	
11	Macau (MAC)	4:16.56	
12	India (IND)	4:17.54	
13	Cambodia (CAM)	4:30.54	
14	Kyrgyzstan (KGZ)	4:32.25	
15	Bahrain (BRN)	4:37.92	
16	Pakistan (PAK)	4:43.62	
17	Mongolia (MGL)	4:47.00	
18	Maldives (MDV)	4:57.89	
