= Indonesia at the Asian Youth Games 2013 =

Indonesia at the 2013 Asian Youth Games
- IOC code: INA
- NOC: Indonesian Olympic Committee
- Website: www.nocindonesia.or.id (in English)

in Nanjing, China 16 - 24 August 2013
- Competitors: 103
- Flag bearer: Jonatan Christie
- Medals Ranked 15th: Gold 1 Silver 2 Bronze 2 Total 5

Asian Youth Games appearances
- 2009; 2013; 2025

Indonesia competed at the 2013 Asian Youth Games in Nanjing, China, from 16 - 24 August 2013. This is Indonesia's second appearance in the competition since the 2009 edition. The Indonesian contingent for this year's games consists of 103 athletes from several sports.The Indonesian team won one gold, two silver and two bronze medals.

== Medalists ==
Medal	Name	Sport	Event	Date
Gold	Ricky Anggawijaya	Swimming	100 m backstroke	19–23 August 2013
Silver	Ricky Anggawijaya	Swimming	200 m backstroke	19–23 August 2013
Silver	Aprilia Kartina	Athletics	1500 m	19–22 August 2013
Bronze	Monalisa Arieswati	Swimming	200 m butterfly	19–23 August 2013
Bronze	Ken Ayuthaya Purnama	Athletics	100 m hurdles	19–22 August 2013

=== Summary ===
Medals by events
Sport	Gold	Silver	Bronze	Total
Swimming	1	1	1	3
Athletics	0	1	1	2
Total	1	2	2	5
