= Chinese Taipei at the 2025 Asian Youth Games =

- IOC code: TPE
- NOC: Chinese Taipei Olympic Committee
- Website: www.tpenoc.net/en/ (in English)

in Manama, Bahrain 22 October 2025 – 31 October 2025
- Competitors: 126 in 11 sports
- Medals: Gold 6 Silver 8 Bronze 15 Total 29

Asian Youth Games appearances
- 2009; 2013; 2025

Chinese Taipei is competing at the 2025 Asian Youth Games in Manama, Bahrain, from 22 to 31 October 2025. This is Chinese Taipei's third appearance in the competition since the 2009 edition.

The Chinese Taipei contingent consists of 126 athletes across 11 sports.

== Medalists ==
These are the medalists from Chinese Taipei, updated as of 27 October 2025.

Medal	Name	Sport	Event	Date
Gold	Pan Hsiao-ching	Taekwondo	Girls' Individual Freestyle Poomsae	23 October
Gold	Huang Kai-lun	Athletics	Boys' High Jump	24 October
Gold	Lin Qiao-ling	Athletics	Girls' 400m Hurdles	25 October
Gold	Wang Cheng-yu	Athletics	Boys' 3000m	26 October
Gold	Huang Yu-teng	Swimming	Boys' 200m Backstroke	27 October
Gold	Chiao Li-er; Chen Xin; Wu Pei-hsuan; Hsieh Ai-tung	3x3 Basketball	Girls'	27 October
Silver	Qiu Bang-xuan	Athletics	Boys' Javelin Throw	24 October
Silver	Hsieh Chih-hsiang; Lo Po-cheng	Road Cycling	Team Time Trial Mixed Relay	24 October
Silver	Lin Hong-xiang	Athletics	Boys' 400m Hurdles	25 October
Silver	Chu Chao-feng	Athletics	Boys' 200m	26 October
Silver	Chen Chiao-ting	Athletics	Girls' High Jump	26 October
Silver	Zeng Zi-yun	Athletics	Girls' Triple Jump	26 October
Silver	Hsieh Chih-hsiang	Road Cycling	Boys' Individual Time Trial	27 October
Silver	Lin Jun-xi	Esports	Street Fighter 6	28 October
Bronze	Lin Chieh-en	Taekwondo	Girls' Individual Recognized Poomsae	23 October
Bronze	Yeh Bing-hsuan; Hsu Hsiang-chu	Taekwondo	Mixed Pair Freestyle Poomsae	23 October
Bronze	Liou Yan; Lee Min-chun	Taekwondo	Mixed Pair Recognized Poomsae	23 October
Bronze	Shih Yun-jhen	Athletics	Girls' Discus Throw	24 October
Bronze	Wu Chia-ying	Athletics	Girls' 400m	24 October
Bronze	Huang Guan Yao	Athletics	Boys' 100m	25 October
Bronze	Hsieh Ping-hua; Lin Jie-en	Golf	Girls' Team	25 October
Bronze	Wang Chieh-ling	Taekwondo	Girls' –49kg	25 October
Bronze	Lo Chin-hsiang	Athletics	Boys' 400m Hurdles	25 October
Bronze	Chou Ko-yi-chun	Taekwondo	Girls' –63kg	26 October
Bronze	Chu Chao-feng; Lin Hong-xiang; Chang Wen-Chi; Lo Chin-hsiang; Lin Yu-en; Huang Guan Yao	Athletics	Boys' Medley Relay	27 October
Bronze	Chao Jie-han	Swimming	Girls' 200m backstroke	27 October
Bronze	Su Bo-ling	Swimming	Boys' 400m freestyle	27 October
Bronze	Chang Fang-yu	Boxing	Girls' –46kg	28 October
Bronze	Lu Wen-jing	Boxing	Girls' –66kg	28 October
