= Ju-jitsu at the 2025 Asian Youth Games =

- Venue: Exhibition World Bahrain
- Dates: 29–30 October 2025

Ju-jitsu at the 2025 Asian Youth Games was held in Sakhir, Bahrain from 29 to 30 October 2025 at the Exhibition World Bahrain. The competition included only jiu-jitsu (ne-waza) events.

== Medalists ==
=== Boys ===
Event	Gold	Silver	Bronze
−48 kg	Saif Al-Blooshi; United Arab Emirates	Mustafo Qudridinov; Tajikistan	Iliyas Baltagazy; Kazakhstan
−48 kg	Saif Al-Blooshi; United Arab Emirates	Mustafo Qudridinov; Tajikistan	Hoàng Mạnh Lượng; Vietnam
−56 kg	Obaid Al-Ketbi; United Arab Emirates	Aldiyar Ualikhan; Kazakhstan	Abdusomad Tynchtykbekov; Kyrgyzstan
−56 kg	Obaid Al-Ketbi; United Arab Emirates	Aldiyar Ualikhan; Kazakhstan	Mukhammad-Mamay Assetuly; Kazakhstan
−62 kg	Abdulla Batyrbek; Kazakhstan	Salem Al-Qubaisi; United Arab Emirates	Bold-Erdeniin Altan-Erdene; Mongolia
−62 kg	Abdulla Batyrbek; Kazakhstan	Salem Al-Qubaisi; United Arab Emirates	Mukhammed Mukhamedov; Kyrgyzstan
−69 kg	Ramazan Tianguber; Kyrgyzstan	Rafael Orumbayev; Kazakhstan	Alisher Sakimov; Kazakhstan
−69 kg	Ramazan Tianguber; Kyrgyzstan	Rafael Orumbayev; Kazakhstan	Abdulaziz Al-Akidi; United Arab Emirates
−85 kg	Park Keon-ho; South Korea	Muslim Arsamakov; Kazakhstan	Pedro Bisi de Jesus; Bahrain
−85 kg	Park Keon-ho; South Korea	Muslim Arsamakov; Kazakhstan	Adam Fernani; Saudi Arabia

=== Girls ===
Event	Gold	Silver	Bronze
−48 kg	Miyu Suzuki; Thailand	Odsürengiin Jivamedmaani; Mongolia	Nông Bảo Ngọc; Vietnam
−48 kg	Miyu Suzuki; Thailand	Odsürengiin Jivamedmaani; Mongolia	Ghala Al-Hammadi; United Arab Emirates
−52 kg	Sofia Anabel Rivas; Singapore	Kamila Kapan; Kazakhstan	Choi Ha-eun; South Korea
−52 kg	Sofia Anabel Rivas; Singapore	Kamila Kapan; Kazakhstan	Batboldyn Mönkhjin; Mongolia
−57 kg	Choe Seul-bi; South Korea	Amina Zhumabekova; Kazakhstan	Hneen Al-Khoori; United Arab Emirates
−57 kg	Choe Seul-bi; South Korea	Amina Zhumabekova; Kazakhstan	Mara-Alexandria Sarinas; Philippines
−63 kg	Isabella Butler; Philippines	Aysha Al-Jneibi; United Arab Emirates	Ziyoda Shomurodova; Uzbekistan
−63 kg	Isabella Butler; Philippines	Aysha Al-Jneibi; United Arab Emirates	Leila Rakhimzhanova; Kazakhstan

== Medal table ==
Rank	Nation	Gold	Silver	Bronze	Total
1	United Arab Emirates (UAE)	2	2	3	7
2	South Korea (KOR)	2	0	1	3
3	Kazakhstan (KAZ)	1	5	4	10
4	Kyrgyzstan (KGZ)	1	0	2	3
5	Philippines (PHI)	1	0	1	2
6	Singapore (SGP)	1	0	0	1
6	Thailand (THA)	1	0	0	1
8	Mongolia (MGL)	0	1	2	3
9	Tajikistan (TJK)	0	1	0	1
10	Vietnam (VIE)	0	0	2	2
11	Bahrain (BRN)	0	0	1	1
11	Saudi Arabia (KSA)	0	0	1	1
11	Uzbekistan (UZB)	0	0	1	1
Totals (13 entries)		9	9	18	36

== Results ==
=== Boys ===
==== 48 kg ====
30 October

Round of 32
Pinpong Kaelong (THA)	2–6	Sebastien Blaize Cabanlig (PHI)
Ngakan Komang Krisna Wijaya (INA)	0–2	Hoàng Mạnh Lượng (VIE)
Sean Khale Juatan (PHI)	4–2	Orkhontuyaagiin Altandösh (MGL)

Round of 16
Ahmad Al-Shamsi (UAE)	0
Sebastien Blaize Cabanlig (PHI)	4
Murat Fazilov (KGZ)	50
Battömöriin Khosbayar (MGL)	0
Mustafo Qudridinov (TJK)	50
Meshari Al-Mutairi (KUW)	0
Aidar Bolys (KAZ)	2
Sanjarbek Rakhmonberdiev (UZB)	0
Alisher Farkhatov (UZB)	0
Hoàng Mạnh Lượng (VIE)	0
Saif Al-Blooshi (UAE)	50
Abdullah Al-Kandari (KUW)	0
Omar Househ (JOR)	2
Imran Khiimanov (KGZ)	2
Sean Khale Juatan (PHI)	0
Iliyas Baltagazy (KAZ)	2

Quarterfinals
Sebastien Blaize Cabanlig (PHI)	2
Murat Fazilov (KGZ)	2
Mustafo Qudridinov (TJK)	4
Aidar Bolys (KAZ)	2
Hoàng Mạnh Lượng (VIE)	2
Saif Al-Blooshi (UAE)	4
Omar Househ (JOR)	0
Iliyas Baltagazy (KAZ)	50

Semifinals
Sebastien Blaize Cabanlig (PHI)	0
Mustafo Qudridinov (TJK)	50
Saif Al-Blooshi (UAE)	2
Iliyas Baltagazy (KAZ)	0

Final
Mustafo Qudridinov (TJK)	0
Saif Al-Blooshi (UAE)	0

Repechages
Murat Fazilov (KGZ)	0
Aidar Bolys (KAZ)	50
Hoàng Mạnh Lượng (VIE)	0
Omar Househ (JOR)	0

Bronze medal matches
Aidar Bolys (KAZ)	0
Iliyas Baltagazy (KAZ)	2
Hoàng Mạnh Lượng (VIE)	0
Sebastien Blaize Cabanlig (PHI)	0

==== 56 kg ====
29 October

Round of 32
Salmon Rizoev (TJK)	2–2	Jin Gabriel Ong (PHI)
Hamad Mohseni (BRN)	0–50	Mohammad Razaq Kohi (AFG)
Obaid Al-Ketbi (UAE)	2–0	Ziad Samara (JOR)
Khaled Habab (KSA)	6–0	Uuganbayaryn Erkhembileg (MGL)
Abdusalim Rozobaev (KGZ)	0–0	Lee Do-yeon (KOR)
Mönkhbaataryn Sanchirbayar (MGL)	2–2	Kaizer Borces (PHI)
Ittichai Pakdeewong (THA)	0–50	Yousuf Mercer (BRN)
Shamshodbek Samatov (UZB)	2–2	Hassan Nada (KSA)
Abdusomad Tynchtykbekov (KGZ)	10–0	Muboriz Saidzoda (TJK)
Muhammad Saqib (PAK)	50–0	Hamdan Al-Najar (UAE)

Round of 16
Rawin Kaewrawang (THA)	0
Jin Gabriel Ong (PHI)	2
Mohammad Razaq Kohi (AFG)	0
Obaid Al-Ketbi (UAE)	6
Muhammadsamir Mirzaboev (UZB)	0
Khaled Habab (KSA)	0
Lee Do-yeon (KOR)	2
Abdulaziz Salman (KUW)	0
Aldiyar Ualikhan (KAZ)	50
Mönkhbaataryn Sanchirbayar (MGL)	0
Yousuf Mercer (BRN)	0
Abdulrahman Al-Shareef (KUW)	0
Hassan Nada (KSA)	0
Abdusomad Tynchtykbekov (KGZ)	0
Muhammad Saqib (PAK)	2
Mukhammad-Mamay Assetuly (KAZ)	9

Quarterfinals
Jin Gabriel Ong (PHI)	0
Obaid Al-Ketbi (UAE)	50
Muhammadsamir Mirzaboev (UZB)	0
Lee Do-yeon (KOR)	0
Aldiyar Ualikhan (KAZ)	9
Yousuf Mercer (BRN)	0
Abdusomad Tynchtykbekov (KGZ)	2
Mukhammad-Mamay Assetuly (KAZ)	0

Semifinals
Obaid Al-Ketbi (UAE)	2
Lee Do-yeon (KOR)	2
Aldiyar Ualikhan (KAZ)	4
Abdusomad Tynchtykbekov (KGZ)	3

Final
Obaid Al-Ketbi (UAE)	50
Aldiyar Ualikhan (KAZ)	0

Repechages
Jin Gabriel Ong (PHI)	0
Muhammadsamir Mirzaboev (UZB)	0
Yousuf Mercer (BRN)	0
Mukhammad-Mamay Assetuly (KAZ)	5

Bronze medal matches
Jin Gabriel Ong (PHI)	0
Abdusomad Tynchtykbekov (KGZ)	0
Mukhammad-Mamay Assetuly (KAZ)	2
Lee Do-yeon (KOR)	2

==== 62 kg ====
29 October

Round of 32
Selim Zunur (KGZ)	0–2	Abdulla Andeez (UAE)
Nguyễn Gia Phong (VIE)	0–0	Enzo Lincuna (PHI)
Oday Darras (PLE)	4–0	Hamid Al-Rwaieh (KUW)
Sor Sophanuth (CAM)	2–0	Metha Thongnitikan (THA)
Salem Al-Qubaisi (UAE)	2–2	Enkhbayaryn Mönkhsüld (MGL)
Saeed Al-Abdulla (QAT)	WO	Yerassyl Sabyr (KAZ)
Sadam Khan (PAK)	0–50	Kritsakorn Niamsuwan (THA)
Hadi Rezayee (AFG)	4–2	Hamad Al-Shuwaib (KUW)

Round of 16
Abdulla Batyrbek (KAZ)	7
Abdulla Andeez (UAE)	0
Nguyễn Gia Phong (VIE)	0
Bold-Erdeniin Altan-Erdene (MGL)	50
Abdurahmon Saidbekov (TJK)	4
Oday Darras (PLE)	0
Sor Sophanuth (CAM)	0
Zayd Al-Nabulsi (JOR)	2
Ibrahim Stas (SYR)	0
Salem Al-Qubaisi (UAE)	50
Saeed Al-Abdulla (QAT)	0
Jacob Tudla (PHI)	4
Mukhammed Mukhamedov (KGZ)	0
Kritsakorn Niamsuwan (THA)	0
Hadi Rezayee (AFG)	0
Shakhrom Makhmurodov (TJK)	4

Quarterfinals
Abdulla Batyrbek (KAZ)	50
Bold-Erdeniin Altan-Erdene (MGL)	0
Abdurahmon Saidbekov (TJK)	7
Zayd Al-Nabulsi (JOR)	0
Salem Al-Qubaisi (UAE)	50
Jacob Tudla (PHI)	0
Mukhammed Mukhamedov (KGZ)	0
Shakhrom Makhmurodov (TJK)	2

Semifinals
Abdulla Batyrbek (KAZ)	50
Abdurahmon Saidbekov (TJK)	0
Salem Al-Qubaisi (UAE)	2
Shakhrom Makhmurodov (TJK)	0

Final
Abdulla Batyrbek (KAZ)	0
Salem Al-Qubaisi (UAE)	0

Repechages
Bold-Erdeniin Altan-Erdene (MGL)	0
Zayd Al-Nabulsi (JOR)	0
Jacob Tudla (PHI)	0
Mukhammed Mukhamedov (KGZ)	50

Bronze medal matches
Bold-Erdeniin Altan-Erdene (MGL)	0
Shakhrom Makhmurodov (TJK)	0
Mukhammed Mukhamedov (KGZ)	50
Abdurahmon Saidbekov (TJK)	0

==== 69 kg ====
30 October

Round of 32
Ismoil Ziyoev (TJK)	0–0	Kittinat Yipsab (THA)
Enkhsaikhany Chingünjav (MGL)	0–2	Abdulrahman Fakeeh (KSA)
Chase Mapalo (PHI)	0–0	Omar Kaso (JOR)
Abdullah Al-Jabr (KUW)	50–0	Hamad Al-Baloshi (PAK)
Koranop Daengin (THA)	0–50	Elyas Banjar (KSA)
Nitsone Pheangsopha (LAO)	0–16	Arleo Magtibay (PHI)

Round of 16
Rafael Orumbayev (KAZ)	0
Ismoil Ziyoev (TJK)	0
Nasrulloh Murodov (UZB)	4
Adil Amangeldiev (KGZ)	0
Faisal Al-Ajmi (KUW)	0
Abdulrahman Fakeeh (KSA)	8
Chase Mapalo (PHI)	0
Abdulaziz Al-Akidi (UAE)	50
Ramazan Tianguber (KGZ)	50
Abdullah Al-Jabr (KUW)	0
Elyas Banjar (KSA)	50
Ölziibayaryn Dölgöön (MGL)	0
Samir Rizaev (TJK)	0
Saif Al-Ameri (UAE)	3
Arleo Magtibay (PHI)	0
Alisher Sakimov (KAZ)	2

Quarterfinals
Rafael Orumbayev (KAZ)	2
Nasrulloh Murodov (UZB)	0
Abdulrahman Fakeeh (KSA)	0
Abdulaziz Al-Akidi (UAE)	4
Ramazan Tianguber (KGZ)	2
Elyas Banjar (KSA)	0
Saif Al-Ameri (UAE)	0
Alisher Sakimov (KAZ)	0

Semifinals
Rafael Orumbayev (KAZ)	2
Abdulaziz Al-Akidi (UAE)	0
Ramazan Tianguber (KGZ)	2
Alisher Sakimov (KAZ)	0

Final
Rafael Orumbayev (KAZ)	2
Ramazan Tianguber (KGZ)	2

Repechages
Nasrulloh Murodov (UZB)	50
Abdulrahman Fakeeh (KSA)	0
Elyas Banjar (KSA)	0
Saif Al-Ameri (UAE)	0

Bronze medal matches
Nasrulloh Murodov (UZB)	0
Alisher Sakimov (KAZ)	2
Elyas Banjar (KSA)	2
Abdulaziz Al-Akidi (UAE)	2

==== 85 kg ====
29 October

Round of 32
Zayed Al-Hosani (UAE)	4–0	Jirasak Khamlek (THA)
Al-Sharif Ghazi Nasser (JOR)	0–3	Batragchaagiin Bat-Erdene (MGL)

Round of 16
Park Keon-ho (KOR)	50
Zayed Al-Hosani (UAE)	0
Baigazy Bagyshbekov (KGZ)	0
Pedro Bisi de Jesus (BRN)	50
Abdulaziz Al-Buraiki (KUW)	0
Jose Alejandro Nofies (PHI)	0
Adam Fernani (KSA)	0
Yermek Ospanov (KAZ)	0
Theyab Al-Jneibi (UAE)	0
Ali Eleyan (PLE)	2
Ianar Sarybaev (KGZ)	2
Saoud Al-Kathiri (QAT)	2
Dhari Al-Fouzan (KUW)	0
Zeus Babanto (PHI)	3
Batragchaagiin Bat-Erdene (MGL)	0
Muslim Arsamakov (KAZ)	50

Quarterfinals
Park Keon-ho (KOR)	50
Pedro Bisi de Jesus (BRN)	0
Abdulaziz Al-Buraiki (KUW)	0
Adam Fernani (KSA)	12
Ali Eleyan (PLE)	0
Saoud Al-Kathiri (QAT)	50
Zeus Babanto (PHI)	0
Muslim Arsamakov (KAZ)	50

Semifinals
Park Keon-ho (KOR)	5
Adam Fernani (KSA)	0
Saoud Al-Kathiri (QAT)	0
Muslim Arsamakov (KAZ)	50

Final
Park Keon-ho (KOR)	50
Muslim Arsamakov (KAZ)	0

Repechages
Pedro Bisi de Jesus (BRN)	50
Abdulaziz Al-Buraiki (KUW)	0
Ali Eleyan (PLE)	0
Zeus Babanto (PHI)	50

Bronze medal matches
Pedro Bisi de Jesus (BRN)	8
Saoud Al-Kathiri (QAT)	0
Zeus Babanto (PHI)	0
Adam Fernani (KSA)	50

=== Girls ===
==== 48 kg ====
30 October

Round of 16
Najla Hashem (UAE)	50
Nuray Shyngazy (KAZ)	0
Miyu Suzuki (THA)	50
Soninbayaryn Ankhnaran (MGL)	0
Nông Bảo Ngọc (VIE)	8
Azthasia Salvadora (PHI)	0

Quarterfinals
Parichaya Uamkhao (THA)	50
Najla Hashem (UAE)	0
Samantha De Leon (PHI)	0
Odsürengiin Jivamedmaani (MGL)	2
Adina Bolatova (KAZ)	0
Miyu Suzuki (THA)	0
Nông Bảo Ngọc (VIE)	2
Ghala Al-Hammadi (UAE)	0

Semifinals
Parichaya Uamkhao (THA)	0
Odsürengiin Jivamedmaani (MGL)	2
Miyu Suzuki (THA)	50
Nông Bảo Ngọc (VIE)	0

Final
Odsürengiin Jivamedmaani (MGL)	0
Miyu Suzuki (THA)	0

Repechages
Najla Hashem (UAE)	10
Samantha De Leon (PHI)	0
Adina Bolatova (KAZ)	0
Ghala Al-Hammadi (UAE)	3

Bronze medal matches
Najla Hashem (UAE)	0
Nông Bảo Ngọc (VIE)	2
Ghala Al-Hammadi (UAE)	0
Parichaya Uamkhao (THA)	0

==== 52 kg ====
29 October

Round of 16
Kamila Kapan (KAZ)	0
Rodha Al-Ameri (UAE)	0
Zachary Amber Regudo (PHI)	0
Viyada Sae-oueng (THA)	2
Sham Al-Mawardi (SYR)	0
Batboldyn Mönkhjin (MGL)	50
Buyanbatyn Buyantsatsral (MGL)	WO
Ray Tabbara (JOR)
Chu Phương Nghi (VIE)	4
Kaltham Hussain (UAE)	2

Quarterfinals
Choi Ha-eun (KOR)	0
Kamila Kapan (KAZ)	2
Viyada Sae-oueng (THA)	0
Batboldyn Mönkhjin (MGL)	0
Sofia Anabel Rivas (SGP)	2
Buyanbatyn Buyantsatsral (MGL)	0
Chu Phương Nghi (VIE)	4
Sachi Khonghun (PHI)	2

Semifinals
Kamila Kapan (KAZ)	0
Batboldyn Mönkhjin (MGL)	0
Sofia Anabel Rivas (SGP)	4
Chu Phương Nghi (VIE)	2

Final
Kamila Kapan (KAZ)	0
Sofia Anabel Rivas (SGP)	0

Repechages
Choi Ha-eun (KOR)	0
Viyada Sae-oueng (THA)	0
Buyanbatyn Buyantsatsral (MGL)	0
Sachi Khonghun (PHI)	0

Bronze medal matches
Choi Ha-eun (KOR)	7
Chu Phương Nghi (VIE)	0
Sachi Khonghun (PHI)	0
Batboldyn Mönkhjin (MGL)	3

==== 57 kg ====
30 October

Round of 16
Nguyễn Thùy Duyên (VIE)	0
Ariuntöriin Khongorzul (MGL)	2
Shaden Fatani (KSA)	0
Amina Zhumabekova (KAZ)	50
Prasita Rumakom (THA)	50
Peng Sengmany (LAO)	0
Darlen Jenise Mitchell (PHI)	0
Taif Al-Hammadi (UAE)	0
Fariza Qosimboeva (TJK)	0
Semaza Khut (JOR)	0
Hneen Al-Khoori (UAE)	0
Pürevsükhiin Erkhsaran (MGL)	0
Mara-Alexandria Sarinas (PHI)	50
Tanaya Pornsakprasert (THA)	2
Adel Kenzhebayeva (KAZ)	0
Choe Seul-bi (KOR)	10

Quarterfinals
Ariuntöriin Khongorzul (MGL)	0
Amina Zhumabekova (KAZ)	3
Prasita Rumakom (THA)	50
Taif Al-Hammadi (UAE)	0
Fariza Qosimboeva (TJK)	0
Hneen Al-Khoori (UAE)	11
Mara-Alexandria Sarinas (PHI)	0
Choe Seul-bi (KOR)	6

Semifinals
Amina Zhumabekova (KAZ)	50
Prasita Rumakom (THA)	0
Hneen Al-Khoori (UAE)	0
Choe Seul-bi (KOR)	2

Final
Amina Zhumabekova (KAZ)	0
Choe Seul-bi (KOR)	8

Repechages
Ariuntöriin Khongorzul (MGL)	2
Taif Al-Hammadi (UAE)	2
Fariza Qosimboeva (TJK)	0
Mara-Alexandria Sarinas (PHI)	4

Bronze medal matches
Taif Al-Hammadi (UAE)	0
Hneen Al-Khoori (UAE)	50
Mara-Alexandria Sarinas (PHI)	50
Prasita Rumakom (THA)	0

==== 63 kg ====
30 October

Round of 16
Reean Joy Pangan (PHI)	0
Sirikhwan Ieamploysri (THA)	4
Ilona Parsaulian Pardede (INA)	0
Erdenebatyn Alimaa (MGL)	20
Leila Rakhimzhanova (KAZ)	5
Maya Ishakat (JOR)	0
Mariam Al-Marzooqi (UAE)	0
Ziyoda Shomurodova (UZB)	7
Isabella Butler (PHI)	50
Ayaulym Dossymzhankyzy (KAZ)	0

Quarterfinals
Aysha Al-Jneibi (UAE)	2
Sirikhwan Ieamploysri (THA)	0
Erdenebatyn Alimaa (MGL)	0
Leila Rakhimzhanova (KAZ)	9
Myagmarjavyn Tümenjargal (MGL)	2
Ziyoda Shomurodova (UZB)	2
Isabella Butler (PHI)	4
Maria Elissavet Kokkoliou (THA)	0

Semifinals
Aysha Al-Jneibi (UAE)	9
Leila Rakhimzhanova (KAZ)	0
Ziyoda Shomurodova (UZB)	0
Isabella Butler (PHI)	4

Final
Aysha Al-Jneibi (UAE)	0
Isabella Butler (PHI)	50

Repechages
Sirikhwan Ieamploysri (THA)	0
Erdenebatyn Alimaa (MGL)	0
Myagmarjavyn Tümenjargal (MGL)	0
Maria Elissavet Kokkoliou (THA)	2

Bronze medal matches
Erdenebatyn Alimaa (MGL)	0
Ziyoda Shomurodova (UZB)	6
Maria Elissavet Kokkoliou (THA)	0
Leila Rakhimzhanova (KAZ)	7
