= Philippines at the 2025 Asian Youth Games =

- IOC code: PHI
- NOC: Philippine Olympic Committee
- Website: www.olympic.ph (in English)

in Manama, Bahrain 22 October 2025 – 31 October 2025
- Competitors: 143 in 19 sports
- Flag bearers: Leo Mhar Lobrido (Opening); Harlyn Serneche (Opening); Isabella Joseline Butler (Closing)
- Medals: Gold 7 Silver 7 Bronze 10 Total 24

Asian Youth Games appearances
- 2009; 2013; 2025

The Philippines competed at the 2025 Asian Youth Games in Manama, Bahrain, from 22 to 31 October 2025. This was the country's third appearance in the competition.

The delegation consists of 143 athletes who are competing in 19 sports.

== Medalists ==
=== Gold ===
No.	Medal	Name	Sport	Event	Date
1	Gold	Kram Airam Carpio	Pencak silat	Girls' 55kg	20 October
2	Gold	Charlie Ratcliff	Mixed martial arts	Girls' 45 kg Modern MMA	25 October
3	Gold	Pi Durden Wangkay	Athletics	Boys' 200m	25 October
4	Gold	Lyre Anie Ngina	Muay	Girls' Wai Kru 14–15	26 October
5	Gold	Zeth Gabriel Bueno	Muay	Boys' Wai Kru 14–15	26 October
6	Gold	Jan Brix Ramiscal; Tyron Jamborillo	Muay	Mixed Team Mai Muay	26 October
7	Gold	Isabella Joseline Butler	Ju-jitsu	Girls' -63kg	30 October

=== Silver ===
No.	Medal	Name	Sport	Event	Date
1	Silver	Kristen Aguila	Taekwondo	Girls' Individual Recognized Poomsae	23 October
2	Silver	Travis Ratcliff	Mixed martial arts	Boys' 60kg Traditional MMA	25 October
3	Silver	Naomi Cesar	Athletics	Girls' 800m	25 October
4	Silver	Jasmine Dagame	Muay	Girls' Wai Kru 16–17	26 October
5	Silver	Jan Brix Ramiscal	Muay	Boys' Wai Kru 16–17	26 October
6	Silver	Jamesray Ajido	Swimming	Boys' 100m Butterfly	27 October
7	Silver	Jhodie Peralta	Weightlifting	Girls' 53kg Snatch	28 October

=== Bronze ===
No.	Medal	Name	Sport	Event	Date
1	Bronze	Crystal Cariño; Nicole Tabucol	Teqball	Girls Doubles	23 October
2	Bronze	Aeden Roffer Cereño	Taekwondo	Boys' Individual Freestyle Poomsae	23 October
3	Bronze	Alexander Tagure Jr.	Mixed martial arts	Boys' 50kg Modern MMA	24 October
4	Bronze	Iyeshia Blair Bituin	Muay	Girls' -51kg Combat Discipline 16–17	25 October
5	Bronze	Princess Jay Ann Diaz	Weightlifting	Girls' 44kg Clean&Jerk	26 October
6	Bronze	Jay-r Colonia	Weightlifting	Boys' 56kg Clean&Jerk	26 October
7	Bronze	Alexsandra Ann Diaz	Weightlifting	Girls' 48kg Clean&Jerk	27 October
8	Bronze	Jhodie Peralta	Weightlifting	Girls' 53kg Clean&Jerk	28 October
9	Bronze	Leo Mhar Lobrido	Boxing	Boys' 46kg	28 October
10	Bronze	Mara-Alexandria Sarinas	Ju-jitsu	Girls' -57kg	30 October

=== Multiple ===
Name	Sport	Gold	Silver	Bronze	Total
Jan Brix Ramiscal	Muay	1	1	0	2
Jhodie Peralta	Weightlifting	0	1	1	2

== Medal summary ==
=== Medals by Sports ===
Sport	1st place, gold medalist(s)	2nd place, silver medalist(s)	3rd place, bronze medalist(s)	Total
Muay	3	2	1	6
Mixed martial arts	1	1	1	3
Athletics	1	1	0	2
Ju-jitsu	1	0	1	2
Pencak silat	1	0	0	1
Weightlifting	0	1	4	5
Taekwondo	0	1	1	2
Swimming	0	1	0	1
Boxing	0	0	1	1
Teqball	0	0	1	1
Total	7	7	10	24

=== Medals by Date ===
Day	Date	1st place, gold medalist(s)	2nd place, silver medalist(s)	3rd place, bronze medalist(s)	Total
1	19 October	0	0	0	0
2	20 October	1	0	0	1
3	21 October	0	0	0	0
4	22 October	0	0	0	0
5	23 October	0	1	2	3
6	24 October	0	0	1	1
7	25 October	2	2	1	5
8	26 October	3	2	2	7
9	27 October	0	1	1	2
10	28 October	0	1	2	3
11	29 October	0	0	0	0
12	30 October	1	0	1	2
Total		7	7	10	24

=== Medals by Gender ===
Gender	1st place, gold medalist(s)	2nd place, silver medalist(s)	3rd place, bronze medalist(s)	Total
Female	4	4	6	13
Male	2	3	4	9
Mixed	1	0	0	1
Total	7	7	10	24

== Athletics ==
=== Boys' ===
==== Track and road events ====
Athlete	Event	Heat		Semifinals		Final	
Athlete	Event	Result	Rank	Result	Rank	Result	Rank
Joel Platon	100m	11.21	4	Did not advance			
Pi Durden Wangkay	100m	10.90	2 Q	10.83	2 Q	10.87	5
Pi Durden Wangkay	200m	22.22	2 Q	—N/a		21.76	1st place, gold medalist(s)

==== Field events ====
Athlete	Event	Final	
Athlete	Event	Distance	Position
Joel Platon	Long jump	5.68	16

=== Girls' ===
==== Track and road events ====
Athlete	Event	Heat		Semifinals		Final	
Athlete	Event	Result	Rank	Result	Rank	Result	Rank
Loraine Batalla	200m	26.01	5	—N/a		Did not advance	
Loraine Batalla	400m	58.55	5	—N/a		Did not advance	
Princess Eromole	400m	58.08	5	—N/a		Did not advance	
Naomi Cesar	800m	2:19.74	1 Q	—N/a		2:08.69	2nd place, silver medalist(s)
Mia Guillergan	800m	2:20.09	2 Q	—N/a		2:17.93	5
Mary Magbanua	3000m	—N/a				DNF	
Shienna Sarsonas	400m hurdles	1:04.64	4 q	—N/a		1:05.67	6
Loraine Batalla; Naomi Cesar; Princess Eromole; Mary Magbanua; Shienna Sarsonas	Medley relay	—N/a		2:18.45	5 q	DNS	

== Badminton ==
Athlete	Event	Round of 64	Round of 32	Round of 16	Quarterfinals	Semifinals	Final	
Athlete	Event	Opposition Score	Opposition Score	Opposition Score	Opposition Score	Opposition Score	Opposition Score	Rank
Cris Ivan Dosano	Boys' singles	Alashoor (BRN); W 2–0	Malikzhan (KAZ); W 2–0	Talasila (IND); L 0–2	Did not advance			
Ron Ezekiel Zacarias	Boys' singles	Ibrahim (MDV); W 2–0	Jeong D-h (KOR); L 0–2	Did not advance				
Eva Bejasa	Girls' singles	Biswas (BAN); W 2–0	Nitajulie (CAM); W 2–0	Kalagotla (IND); L 0–2	Did not advance			
Cristel Fuentespina	Girls' singles	Bye	Liu (HKG); L 0–2	Did not advance				
Shachie Calderon; Roaquine Ramos	Mixed doubles	Bye	Irshad; Suleman (PAK); W 2–0	Jaison; Punera (IND); L 0–2	Did not advance			
John Lanuza; Rosheila Quierez	Mixed doubles	Bye	Azib; Shafa (INA); L 0–2	Did not advance				

== Beach wrestling ==
Athlete	Event	Group Stage				Qualifications	Semifinals	Final	
Athlete	Event	Opposition Score	Opposition Score	Opposition Score	Rank	Opposition Score	Opposition Score	Opposition Score	Rank
Margarito Angana III	Boys' 60 kg	Lâm M.G.H. (VIE); L 0–2	Al-Saud (KSA); W 2–1	Fulmali (IND); L 0–4	3	Did not advance			
Markus Iñigo Perez	Boys' 70 kg	—N/a				Shokouhi (IRI); L 1–2	Did not advance		
Ella Rosario Olaso	Girls' 55 kg	Bùi N.T.T. (VIE); L 0–2	Jaida (BRN); W 4–0	—N/a	2 Q	—N/a	Anjali (IND); L 0–2	Duangchit (THA); L 1–2	4

== Boxing ==
Boys

Athlete	Event	Round of 32	Round of 16	Quarterfinals	Semifinals	Final	Rank
Athlete	Event	Opposition Result	Opposition Result	Opposition Result	Opposition Result	Opposition Result	Rank
Leo Mhar Lobrido	46 kg	—N/a	Al-Hadidi (JOR); W 5–0	Dewasiri Narayana (SRI); W 5–0	Yorkinjonov (UZB); L 0–5	Did not advance	3rd place, bronze medalist(s)
Jefferson Amaya	50 kg	Bye	Moibungkhongbam (IND); L 1–4	Did not advance			
John Michael Estorba	54 kg	Bye	Zhumakan (KAZ); L 0–5	Did not advance			
Justin James Zampatti	75 kg	—N/a	Bye	Murodilloev (UZB); L RSC R2	Did not advance		

Girls

Athlete	Event	Round of 16	Quarterfinals	Semifinals	Final	Rank
Athlete	Event	Opposition Result	Opposition Result	Opposition Result	Opposition Result	Rank
Shairylle Pores	46 kg	Ahadova (UZB); W 3–2	Chen F-y (TPE); L 0–5	Did not advance		
Ermalie Caballero	50 kg	Cui X. (CHN); L 2–3	Did not advance			

== Cycling ==
Road race

Athlete	Event	Final	
Athlete	Event	Time	Rank
Joelian Abdul Hamid	Boys' individual	DNF	
CJ Cabreros	Boys' individual	2:24:15	12
Carl Laurence Espinosa	Boys' individual	DNF	
Maria Luisse Crisselle Alejado	Girls' individual	1:59:26	11
Maritanya Krog	Girls' individual	1:59:26	6
Yvaine Osias	Girls' individual	1:59:30	16

Time trial

Athlete	Event	Final	
Athlete	Event	Time	Rank
CJ Cabreros	Boys' individual	23:06.39	10
Maria Luisse Crisselle Alejado	Girls' individual	18:53.40	13
Joelian Abdul Hamid; Maria Luisse Crisselle Alejado; CJ Cabreros; Carl Laurence Espinosa; Maritanya Krog; Yvaine Osias	Mixed team relay	1:04:22.70	9

== Golf ==
Boys'

Athlete	Event	Round 1	Round 2	Round 3	Total	Par	Rank
Tristan Padilla	Individual	~~78~~	74	70	144	+6	17
David Serdenia	Individual	72	74	~~82~~	146	+12	T25
Patrick Tambalque	Individual	75	~~76~~	78	153	+13	T27
Tristan Padilla; David Serdenia; Patrick Tambalque	Team	147	148	148	443	+11	6

Girls'

Athlete	Event	Round 1	Round 2	Round 3	Total	Par	Rank
Crista Miñoza	Individual	72	73	73	218	+2	17
Eliana Saga	Individual	70	70	70	210	−6	13
Precious Zaragosa	Individual	~~80~~	~~76~~	~~79~~	0	+19	27
Crista Miñosa; Eliana Saga; Precious Zaragosa	Team	142	143	143	428	−4	T6

== Ju-jitsu ==
Boys'

Athlete	Event	Round of 32	Round of 16	Quarterfinals	Semifinals	Repechage	Final / BM	
Athlete	Event	Opposition Result	Opposition Result	Opposition Result	Opposition Result	Opposition Result	Opposition Result	Rank
Sebastien Blaize Cabanlig	48 kg	Kaelong (THA); W 6–2	Al-Shamsi (UAE); W 4–0	Fazilov (KGZ); W 2–2 ADV	Qudridinov (TJK); L 0–50	—N/a	Hoàng M.L. (VIE); L ADV	4
Sean Khale Juatan	48 kg	Orkhontuya (MGL); W 4–0	Baltagazy (KAZ); L 0–2	Did not advance				
Kaizer Borces	56 kg	Munkhbaatar (MGL); L 2–2	Did not advance					
Jin Gabriel Ong	56 kg	Rizoev (TJK); W 2–2	Kaewrawang (THA); W 2–0	Alketbi (UAE); L 0–50	Did not advance	Mirzaboev (UZB); W ADV	Tynchtykbekov (KGZ); L ADV	4
Duke Enzo Iniaki Lincuna	62 kg	Nguyễn G.P. (VIE); L ADV	Did not advance					
Jacob Florencio Tudla	62 kg	Bye	Al-Abdulla (QAT); W 4–0	Al-Qubasi (UAE); L 0–50	Did not advance	Mukhamedov (KGZ); L 0–50	Did not advance	
Arleo Magtibay III	69 kg	Pheangsopha (LAO); W 16–0	Sakimov (KAZ); L 0–2	Did not advance				
Chase Emmanuelle Mapalo	69 kg	Kaso (JOR); W ADV	Alakidi (UAE); L 0–50	Did not advance				
Zeus Babanto	85 kg	Bye	Al-Fouzan (KUW); W 3–0	Arsamakov (KAZ); L 0–50	Did not advance	Eleyan (PLE); W 50–0	Fernani (KSA); L 0–50	4
Jose Alejandro Nofies	85 kg	Bye	Al-Buraiki (KUW); L PNT	Did not advance				

Girls'

Athlete	Event	Round of 16	Quarterfinals	Semifinals	Repechage	Final / BM	
Athlete	Event	Opposition Result	Opposition Result	Opposition Result	Opposition Result	Opposition Result	Rank
Jilliane Samantha de Leon	48 kg	Bye	Odsuren (MGL); L 0–2	Did not advance	Hashem (UAE); L 0–10	Did not advance	
Riwen Azthasia Sakina Salvadora	48 kg	Nông B.N. (VIE); L 0–8	Did not advance				
Sachi Khonghun	52 kg	Bye	Chu P.N. (VIE); L 2–4	Did not advance	Buyanbat (MGL); W ADV	Batbold (MGL); L 0–3	4
Zachary Amber Regudo	52 kg	Sae-Oueng (THA); L 0–2	Did not advance				
Darlen Jenise Mitchell	57 kg	Al-Hammadi (UAE); L ADV	Did not advance				
Mara-Alexandria Sarinas	57 kg	Pornsakprasert (THA); W 50–2	Choe S-b (KOR); L 0–6	Did not advance	Qosimboeva (TJK); W 4–0	Rumakom (THA); W 50–0	3rd place, bronze medalist(s)
Isabella Joseline Butler	63 kg	Dossymzhankyzy (KAZ); W 50–0	Kokkoliou (THA); W 4–0	Shomurodova (UZB); W 4–0	—N/a	Aljneibi (UAE); W 50–0	1st place, gold medalist(s)
Reean Joy Pangan	63 kg	Ieamploysri (THA); L 0–4	Did not advance				

== Kurash ==
Athlete	Event	Round of 16	Quarterfinals	Semifinals	Final	Rank
Athlete	Event	Opposition Result	Opposition Result	Opposition Result	Opposition Result	Rank
Elijah Mendoza	Boys' 65 kg	Turaev (TJK); L 000–100	Did not advance			
Zeus Babanto	Boys' 83 kg	Bye	Mokarrami (IRI); L 001–111	Did not advance		
Quency Alcantara	Girls' 52 kg	Bye	Karimova (UZB); L 000–011	Did not advance		
Syrine Mae Bacani	Girls' 70 kg	—N/a	Barzegar (IRI); L 000–100	Did not advance		

== Mixed martial arts ==
=== Traditional ===
Boys

Athlete	Event	Round of 16	Quarterfinals	Semifinals	Final	
Athlete	Event	Opposition Score	Opposition Score	Opposition Score	Opposition Score	Rank
Travis Ratcliff	60 kg	Deng H. (CHN); W DSQ	Abdurashidov (UZB); W 3–0	Begmurodzoda (TJK); W DSQ	Hatamianafshari (IRI); L 3–0	2nd place, silver medalist(s)
Andreas Lucho Aguilar	65 kg	—N/a	Sultanakhmedov (BRN); L 0–3	Did not advance		

=== Modern ===
Athlete	Event	Round of 16	Quarterfinals	Semifinals	Final	
Athlete	Event	Opposition Score	Opposition Score	Opposition Score	Opposition Score	Rank
Alexander Tagure Jr.	Boys' 50 kg	Bye	Al-Sayed (KSA); W 2–1	Anvarov (UZB); L SM	Did not advance	3rd place, bronze medalist(s)
Jan Michael Tabunot	Boys' 55 kg	Ryenchindorj (MGL); W 2–1	Al-Ghamdi (KSA); L SM	Did not advance		
Charlie Ratcliff	Girls' 45 kg	—N/a	Khorn (CAM); W DSQ	Tsoy (KAZ); W 3–0	Khaihong (THA); W SM	1st place, gold medalist(s)

== Muaythai ==
=== Wai kru ===
Athlete	Event	Qualification		Final	
Athlete	Event	Score	Rank	Score	Rank
Zeth Gabriel Bueno	Boy's 14–15	9.03	1 Q	9.17	1st place, gold medalist(s)
Jan Brix Ramiscal	Boys' 16–17	9.17	1 Q	9.23	2nd place, silver medalist(s)
Lyre Anie Ngina	Girls' 14–15	8.90	1 Q	9.00	1st place, gold medalist(s)
Jasmine Dagame	Girls' 16–17	8.83	2 Q	8.93	2nd place, silver medalist(s)

=== Mai muay ===
Athlete	Event	Qualification		Final	
Athlete	Event	Score	Rank	Score	Rank
Tyron Jamborillo; Jan Brix Ramiscal	Mixed team	9.07	1 Q	9.20	1st place, gold medalist(s)

=== Combat discipline ===
Boys'

Athlete	Event	Round of 32	Round of 16	Quarterfinals	Semifinals	Final	Rank
Athlete	Event	Opposition Result	Opposition Result	Opposition Result	Opposition Result	Opposition Result	Rank
Xhylord Pete Medina	45 kg 14–15	—N/a	Han Z. (CHN); L 8–CCL	Did not advance			
Salko Osmundo Velic	54 kg 16–17	Bye	Nurkhujaev (UZB); L 26–30	Did not advance			
Martin James Fernando	57 kg 16–17	—N/a	Khun (CAM); L 28–29	Did not advance			

Girls'

Athlete	Event	Round of 16	Quarterfinals	Semifinals	Final	Rank
Athlete	Event	Opposition Result	Opposition Result	Opposition Result	Opposition Result	Rank
Kale Casey Tan	45 kg 14–15	Beishenalieva (KGZ); L 27–30	Did not advance			
Krisha Fascoy	48 kg 14–15	Handique (IND); W CCL–17	Nguyễn T.T.P. (VIE); L RSCS	Did not advance		
Xian Denise Robillos	48 kg 16–17	Bye	Xie J. (CHN); L 27–30	Did not advance		
Iyeshia Blair Bituin	51 kg 16–17	—N/a	Muzafari (AFG); W 30–26	Om (CAM); L 27–30	Did not advance	3rd place, bronze medalist(s)

== Pencak silat ==
Athlete	Event	Round of 16	Quarterfinals	Semifinals	Final	Rank
Athlete	Event	Opposition Result	Opposition Result	Opposition Result	Opposition Result	Rank
Jelou Eluna	Boys' 59–63 kg	—N/a	Raqib Darwisy (MAS); L 13–40	Did not advance		
Kram Airam Carpio	Girls' 51–55 kg	Kolasangiani (IRI); W 36–22	Thakur (IND); W 83–17	Azizova (KAZ); W 46–27	Olifia (INA); W 33–19	1st place, gold medalist(s)

== Swimming ==
Athlete	Event	Heats		Final	
Athlete	Event	Time	Rank	Time	Rank
Jamesray Ajido	Boys' 50m butterfly	25.38	2 Q	25.45	7
Jamesray Ajido	Boys' 50m freestyle	25.33	5	Did not advance	
Jamesray Ajido	Boys' 100m butterfly	56.06	1 Q	55.11	2nd place, silver medalist(s)
Jamesray Ajido	Boys' 100m freestyle	54.77	7	Did not advance	
Kyla Bulaga	Girls' 50m butterfly	31.07	6	Did not advance	
Kyla Bulaga	Girls' 100m breaststroke	1:18.50	6	Did not advance	
Kyla Bulaga	Girls' 100m butterfly	1:07.28	6	Did not advance	
Kyla Bulaga	Girls' 200m breaststroke	2:40.93	3 R	Did not advance	
Kyla Bulaga	Girls' 200m butterfly	2:22.68	4 Q	2:25.05	8
Kyla Bulaga	Girls' 200m freestyle	2:14.13	4	Did not advance	
Kyla Bulaga	Girls' 200m individual medley	2:29.58	6	Did not advance	
Kyla Bulaga	Girls' 400m freestyle	4:38.63	7	Did not advance	
Riannah Coleman	Girls' 50m breaststroke	34.36	2	Did not advance	
Riannah Coleman	Girls' 100m breaststroke	1:13.79	2 Q	1:14.49	7
Riannah Coleman	Girls' 100m butterfly	1:07.51	5	Did not advance	
Riannah Coleman	Girls' 200m breaststroke	2:42.73	4	Did not advance	

== Table tennis ==
Singles

Athlete	Event	Group Stage			Round of 64	Round of 32	Round of 16	Quarterfinals	Semifinals	Final	
Athlete	Event	Opposition Score	Opposition Score	Rank	Opposition Score	Opposition Score	Opposition Score	Opposition Score	Opposition Score	Opposition Score	Rank
John Marin	Boys'	Man (HKG); L 0–3	Arya (IND); L 1–3	3	Did not advance						
Emmanuel Paculba	Boys'	Amiri (IRI); L 1–3	Al-Hawai (UAE); W 2–3	2 Q	Abdalla (QAT); W 3–0	Li H. (CHN); L 0–3	Did not advance				
Jacob Quindo	Boys'	Tang Y. (CHN); L 0–3	Al-Kassab (SYR); W 3–2	2 Q	Bye	Faraji (IRI); L 0–3	Did not advance				
Jannaj Alarcon	Girls'	Loy (SGP); L 0–3	Al-Shammari (KUW); W 3–0	2 Q	—N/a	Zaza (SYR); L 0–3	Did not advance				
Zuri Chua	Girls'	Su T.T. (HKG); L 0–3	Huon (CAM); W 3–0	2 Q	—N/a	Yavari (IRI); L 0–3	Did not advance				
Joanna Esguerra	Girls'	Mak (HKG); L 0–3	Muizzu (MDV); W 3–0	2 Q	—N/a	Heo Y-r (KOR); L 0–3	Did not advance				

Doubles

Athlete	Event	Round of 64	Round of 32	Round of 16	Quarterfinals	Semifinals	Final	
Athlete	Event	Opposition Score	Opposition Score	Opposition Score	Opposition Score	Opposition Score	Opposition Score	Rank
Jannaj Alarcon; John Marin	Mixed	Dugersuren; Tuvshinbayar (MGL); W 3–0	Fu; Saurbay (KAZ); L 2–3	Did not advance				
Joanna Esguerra; Emmanuel Paculba	Mixed	Bye	Preechayan; Vijitviriyagul (THA); L 0–3	Did not advance				

== Taekwondo ==
=== Poomsae ===
Freestyle

Athlete	Event		
Athlete	Event	Score	Rank
Aeden Roffer Cereño	Boys' individual	7.040	4
Aeden Roffer Cereño; Andria Margaret Palabrica	Mixed pair	6.820	5

Recognized

Athlete	Event	Round of 32	Round of 16	Quarterfinals	Semifinals	Final	
Athlete	Event	Opposition Score	Opposition Score	Opposition Score	Opposition Score	Opposition Score	Rank
Caleb Angelo Calde	Boys' individual	—N/a	Naghiee (IRI); L 8.3900–8.5100	Did not advance			
Kristen Ambriel Aguila	Girls' individual	Bye	Syeed (BAN); W 8.1700–7.4000	Aibekova (KGZ); W 8.4400–8.1400	Li Y. (CHN); W 8.5200–8.5100	Shahriani (IRI); L 8.6000–8.8600	2nd place, silver medalist(s)
Angel Lyn Yvainne Dacanay; Alfonzo Gabriel Tormon	Mixed pair	—N/a	Bye	Injang; Yimprasert (THA); L 8.4300–8.5000	Did not advance		

=== Kyorugi ===
Boys'

Athlete	Event	Round of 32	Round of 16	Quarterfinals	Semifinals	Final	
Athlete	Event	Opposition Score	Opposition Score	Opposition Score	Opposition Score	Opposition Score	Rank
Juan Victorio Yamat	48 kg	Piagai (KGZ); W 2–0	Khamis (UAE); W DSQ	Bakhramkulov (KAZ); L 1–2	Did not advance		
Matt Rejhan Levestre	55 kg	bin Mohd Azman (MAS); W 2–0	Haji (BRN); W 2–0	Vassenkin (KAZ); L 0–2	Did not advance		
Chuck Aeron Alariao	63 kg	Bye	Mohamed (UAE); W 2–1	Putrawitama (INA); L 1–2	Did not advance		
Lhord Jared Patrick Pasaron	73 kg	Bye	Dakhalallah (JOR); L 0–2	Did not advance			
Raphael Kylle Valentin Gaupo	+73 kg	bin Sultan (KUW); W 2–1	Nigmatov (TJK); L 0–2	Did not advance			

Girls'

Athlete	Event	Round of 32	Round of 16	Quarterfinals	Semifinals	Final	
Athlete	Event	Opposition Score	Opposition Score	Opposition Score	Opposition Score	Opposition Score	Rank
Felicity Jana Castel	44 kg	Bye	Ruslanova (UZB); W 2–0	Serikbayeva (KAZ); L 0–2	Did not advance		
Rhiyanne Agatha Shay Cadileña	49 kg	Ebrahimian (IRI); L DSQ	Did not advance				
Princess Sarah Grace Pascual	55 kg	Bye	Teshabaeva (KGZ); L 1–2	Did not advance			
EJ Gaa	63 kg	—N/a	Bye	Lotfizadeh Gabalou (IRI); L 0–2	Did not advance		
Mary Heart Capulong	+63 kg	—N/a	Albqowr (JOR); L 0–2	Did not advance			

== Teqball ==
=== Boys ===
Athlete	Event	Group stage					Rank	Quarterfinals	Semifinals	Final / BM	Rank
Athlete	Event	Opposition Result	Opposition Result	Opposition Result	Opposition Result	Opposition Result	Rank	Opposition Result	Opposition Result	Opposition Result	Rank
Angelo Paracale	Singles	Dazzu (INA); W 2–0	Ganzorig (MGL); W 2–0	Sharif (BRN); L 0–2	—N/a		2 Q	Khammas (IRQ); L 0–2	Did not advance		
Nomar Andres; Fits Erece	Doubles	Hasan; Isa (BRN); W 2–0	Cheat; Meun (CAM); L 1–2	Mahasaksit; Potong (THA); L 0–2	Barbhuiya; Singha (IND); L 1–2	Al-Elayawi; Khammas (IRQ); L 0–2	5	Did not advance			

=== Girls ===
Athlete	Event	Group stage			Rank	Quarterfinals	Semifinals	Final / BM	Rank
Athlete	Event	Opposition Result	Opposition Result	Opposition Result	Rank	Opposition Result	Opposition Result	Opposition Result	Rank
Joellene Cruz	Singles	Abdulaziz (BRN); L 0–2	Gogoi (IND); W 2–0	Khachffe (LBN); L 0–2	3 Q	Jiang X. (CHN); L 0–2	Did not advance		
Crystal Cariño; Nicole Tabucol	Doubles	Abdulaziz; Albanna (BRN); L 0–2	Mageshkumar; Sankar (IND); W 2–1	—N/a	2 Q	—N/a	Kenkhunthod; Simawong (THA); L 0–2	Abdulaziz; Albanna (BRN); W 2–1	3rd place, bronze medalist(s)

=== Mixed doubles ===
Athletes	Group stage			Rank	Quarterfinals	Semifinals	Final / BM	Rank
Athletes	Opposition Result	Opposition Result	Opposition Result	Rank	Opposition Result	Opposition Result	Opposition Result	Rank
Nomar Andres; Nicole Tabucol	Al-Dulaimi; Al-Elayawi (IRQ); L 0–2	Amirul; Mohamad (MAS); L 0–2	Albanna; Sharif (BRN); W 2–1	3 Q	Luan S. Wu C. (CHN); L 0–2	Did not advance		

== Triathlon ==
Athlete	Event	Final	
Athlete	Event	Time	Rank
Peter Sancho del Rosario	Boys' individual super sprint	DSQ	
Euan Arrow Ramos	Boys' individual super sprint	DNF	

== Volleyball ==
Event	Preliminary Round			Group Stage			Quarterfinals	Semifinals	Final / BM	
Event	Opposition Score	Opposition Score	Rank	Opposition Score	Opposition Score	Rank	Opposition Score	Opposition Score	Opposition Score	Rank
Girls' team	South Korea; W 3–2	Thailand; L 0–3	2 Q	China; W 3–0	Hong Kong; W 3–0	1 Q	Chinese Taipei; W 3–1	Iran; L 1–3	Thailand; L 0–3	4

== Weightlifting ==
Boys

Athlete	Event	Snatch					Clean & Jerk					Total	Rank
Athlete	Event	1	2	3	Result	Rank	1	2	3	Result	Rank	Total	Rank
Jay-R Colonia	56 kg	101	106	111	111	4	133	137	~~140~~	137	3rd place, bronze medalist(s)	248	3
Jerick Icon Castro	60 kg	105	~~110~~	~~111~~	105	5	133	137	~~140~~	137	5	242	4
Dave Angelo Pacaldo	65 kg	108	~~113~~	113	113	6	130	~~140~~	140	140	8	253	6

Girls

Athlete	Event	Snatch					Clean & Jerk					Total	Rank
Athlete	Event	1	2	3	Result	Rank	1	2	3	Result	Rank	Total	Rank
Princess Jay Ann Diaz	44 kg	~~62~~	~~63~~	63	63	4	78	~~83~~	~~83~~	78	3rd place, bronze medalist(s)	141	4
Alexsandra Ann Diaz	48 kg	70	~~73~~	~~73~~	70	4	88	90	92	92	3rd place, bronze medalist(s)	162	3
Jhodie Peralta	53 kg	82	85	87	87	2nd place, silver medalist(s)	100	~~105~~	~~107~~	100	3rd place, bronze medalist(s)	187	3

== Wrestling ==
Boys'

Athlete	Event	Qualification	Round of 16	Quarterfinals	Semifinals	Repechage	Final / BM	
Athlete	Event	Opposition Result	Opposition Result	Opposition Result	Opposition Result	Opposition Result	Opposition Result	Rank
John Roe Malazarte	Freestyle 45 kg	Bye	—N/a	Thenko Sanduge (SRI); L 8–13	Did not advance			
Khean Carl Sabuelo	Freestyle 48 kg	Ushimado (JPN); L 0–11	Did not advance			Kalateh Abbasabad (IRI); L 2–10	Did not advance	
Nathaniel Nama	Freestyle 51 kg	Çaryýew (TKM); L 5–8	Did not advance			—N/a	Did not advance	
Lloyd Allen Balbaboco	Freestyle 55 kg	Bye	Jhong J-h (TPE); L 0–10	Did not advance				
Sylvester Pasigian	Freestyle 60 kg	Bye	Nasriddinov (UZB); L 0–10	Did not advance				
Charles Johnson Calawen	Freestyle 65 kg	Haj Mollamohammadi (IRI); L 0–10	Did not advance			Ganiev (KGZ); L 0–10	Did not advance	
Angelo Lucian Salud	Freestyle 71 kg	Zarrinkam (IRI); L 0–12	Did not advance			Jumanazarov (UZB); L 0–10	Did not advance	

Girls'

Athlete	Event	Group Stage			Qualification	Quarterfinals	Semifinals	Repechage	Final / BM	
Athlete	Event	Opposition Result	Opposition Result	Rank	Opposition Result	Opposition Result	Opposition Result	Opposition Result	Opposition Result	Rank
Rhea Mae Damiao	Freestyle 40 kg	Jo H-g (PRK); L 0–3	Phanak (THA); L 1–10	3	—N/a		Did not advance	—N/a	Did not advance	
LJ Xyserlyn Dongpopen	Freestyle 46 kg	—N/a			Bye	Phat (CAM); W 11–0	Yuan T. (CHN); L 0–10	—N/a	Kudaynazarova (UZB); L 0–4	4
Charmel Gem Angana	Freestyle 49 kg	—N/a			Bye	Mun (CAM); W 10–0	Toktosun Kyzy (KGZ); L 0–10	—N/a	Nokrod (THA); L 4–6	4
Jamila Aasya Lumanog	Freestyle 53 kg	—N/a			Mingyasharova (UZB); L 0–10	Did not advance		—N/a	Did not advance	
Gilian Pauline Nietes	Freestyle 57 kg	—N/a			Bye	Zholdoshbekova (KGZ); L 0–4	Did not advance	—N/a	Avezova (UZB); L 0–10	4
Miriam Grace Balisme	Freestyle 61 kg	—N/a			Bye	Awano (JPN); L 0–10	Did not advance	—N/a	Did not advance	
