= Taekwondo at the 2025 Asian Youth Games =

2025 Asian Youth Games competition

- Venue: Exhibition World Bahrain
- Dates: 23–26 October 2025

Taekwondo at the 2025 Asian Youth Games was held in Sakhir, Bahrain from 23 to 26 October 2025 at the Exhibition World Bahrain.

== Medalists ==
=== Poomsae ===
Event	Gold	Silver	Bronze
Boys' freestyle	Punnathorn Sirisom; Thailand	Wang Zhihao; China	Mohammad Amin Habibzadeh; Iran
Boys' freestyle	Punnathorn Sirisom; Thailand	Wang Zhihao; China	Aeden Roffer Cereño; Philippines
Boys' recognized	Behdad Naghiei; Iran	Gao Zixuan; China	Debasish Das; India
Boys' recognized	Behdad Naghiei; Iran	Gao Zixuan; China	Pongsakorn Thongdee; Thailand
Girls' freestyle	Pan Hsiao-ching; Chinese Taipei	Zhang Mengyuan; China	Sana Shaygan; Iran
Girls' freestyle	Pan Hsiao-ching; Chinese Taipei	Zhang Mengyuan; China	Tiffany Sia; Malaysia
Girls' recognized	Zeinab Shahriari; Iran	Kristen Aguila; Philippines	Lin Chieh-en; Chinese Taipei
Girls' recognized	Zeinab Shahriari; Iran	Kristen Aguila; Philippines	Li Yuqi; China
Mixed pair freestyle	Thailand; Sakwarin Opachat; Rinrada Numthongthai	China; Wang Zhihao; Zhang Mengyuan	Iran; Mohammad Amin Habibzadeh; Sana Shaygan
Mixed pair freestyle	Thailand; Sakwarin Opachat; Rinrada Numthongthai	China; Wang Zhihao; Zhang Mengyuan	Chinese Taipei; Yeh Bing-hsuan; Hsu Hsiang-chu
Mixed pair recognized	Iran; Behdad Naghiei; Zeinab Shahriari	Thailand; Nitikon Yimprasert; Suchanan Injang	India; Shivanshu Patel; Yashwini Singh
Mixed pair recognized	Iran; Behdad Naghiei; Zeinab Shahriari	Thailand; Nitikon Yimprasert; Suchanan Injang	Chinese Taipei; Lee Min-chun; Liou Yan

=== Kyorugi ===
Event	Gold	Silver	Bronze
Boys' −48 kg	Panuwat Kasemsin; Thailand	Abdallah Shahin; Jordan	Pan Yuhan; China
Boys' −48 kg	Panuwat Kasemsin; Thailand	Abdallah Shahin; Jordan	Bunyad Bakhramkulov; Kazakhstan
Boys' −55 kg	Yevgeniy Vassenkin; Kazakhstan	Asadbek Samandarov; Uzbekistan	Abdujafari Bahodur; Tajikistan
Boys' −55 kg	Yevgeniy Vassenkin; Kazakhstan	Asadbek Samandarov; Uzbekistan	Ahmad Al-Rababah; Jordan
Boys' −63 kg	Omadbek Otabekov; Uzbekistan	Nurali Makhmut; Kazakhstan	Liu Haoran; China
Boys' −63 kg	Omadbek Otabekov; Uzbekistan	Nurali Makhmut; Kazakhstan	Kavka Zhafif Putrawitama; Indonesia
Boys' −73 kg	Akhadjon Mukhtorov; Uzbekistan	Zhanaibek Shamuratov; Kazakhstan	Mohammad Javad Geryan; Iran
Boys' −73 kg	Akhadjon Mukhtorov; Uzbekistan	Zhanaibek Shamuratov; Kazakhstan	Abdalhadi Farajallah; Palestine
Boys' +73 kg	Eom Sim-ok; South Korea	Dzhonibek Nigmatov; Tajikistan	Trần Hồ Nhân Văn; Vietnam
Boys' +73 kg	Eom Sim-ok; South Korea	Dzhonibek Nigmatov; Tajikistan	Bat-Erdeniin Belgütei; Mongolia
Girls' −44 kg	Aiym Serikbayeva; Kazakhstan	Hoàng Thị Thu Huyền; Vietnam	Fatima Al-Abdallat; Jordan
Girls' −44 kg	Aiym Serikbayeva; Kazakhstan	Hoàng Thị Thu Huyền; Vietnam	Phetchadaporn Patnanthahirun; Thailand
Girls' −49 kg	Li Mixue; China	Lee Si-woo; South Korea	Queenita Keisha Azzahra; Indonesia
Girls' −49 kg	Li Mixue; China	Lee Si-woo; South Korea	Wang Chieh-ling; Chinese Taipei
Girls' −55 kg	Rushanakhon Ravshanova; Uzbekistan	Xu Wanlin; China	Rania Taqatqa; Jordan
Girls' −55 kg	Rushanakhon Ravshanova; Uzbekistan	Xu Wanlin; China	Dina Babarahim; Iran
Girls' −63 kg	Guo Ruyue; China	Pinar Lotfizadeh; Iran	Chou Ko-yi-chun; Chinese Taipei
Girls' −63 kg	Guo Ruyue; China	Pinar Lotfizadeh; Iran	Zainab Busila; Jordan
Girls' +63 kg	Zhang Qing; China	Asal Goltappeh; Iran	Lama Al-Bqowr; Jordan
Girls' +63 kg	Zhang Qing; China	Asal Goltappeh; Iran	Bùi Mai Phương; Vietnam
Mixed team	China; Gao Donghanqi; Wang Wenjun; Ren Kunyue; Zhang Qing	Thailand; Anantasin Kajaroen; Natthakit Maliwan; Achiraya Chayangam; Nattamonkarn Tamanit	Iran; Amir Eghbali; Mohammad Javad Geryan; Asal Goltappeh; Pinar Lotfizadeh
Mixed team	China; Gao Donghanqi; Wang Wenjun; Ren Kunyue; Zhang Qing	Thailand; Anantasin Kajaroen; Natthakit Maliwan; Achiraya Chayangam; Nattamonkarn Tamanit	India; Hardik Ahlawat; Nihal Dewali; Dhanashree Pawar; Gharluxmi Phurailatpam

== Medal table ==
Rank	Nation	Gold	Silver	Bronze	Total
1	China (CHN)	4	5	3	12
2	Iran (IRI)	3	2	6	11
3	Thailand (THA)	3	2	2	7
4	Uzbekistan (UZB)	3	1	0	4
5	Kazakhstan (KAZ)	2	2	1	5
6	South Korea (KOR)	1	1	0	2
7	Chinese Taipei (TPE)	1	0	5	6
8	Jordan (JOR)	0	1	5	6
9	Vietnam (VIE)	0	1	2	3
10	Philippines (PHI)	0	1	1	2
10	Tajikistan (TJK)	0	1	1	2
12	India (IND)	0	0	3	3
13	Indonesia (INA)	0	0	2	2
14	Malaysia (MAS)	0	0	1	1
14	Mongolia (MGL)	0	0	1	1
14	Palestine (PLE)	0	0	1	1
Totals (16 entries)		17	17	34	68

== Results ==
=== Poomsae ===
==== Boys' freestyle ====
23 October

Rank	Athlete	Score
1st place, gold medalist(s)	Punnathorn Sirisom (THA)	7.62
2nd place, silver medalist(s)	Wang Zhihao (CHN)	7.38
3rd place, bronze medalist(s)	Mohammad Amin Habibzadeh (IRI)	7.14
3rd place, bronze medalist(s)	Aeden Roffer Cereño (PHI)	7.04
5	Chao Chiu-yang (TPE)	6.88
6	Harry Daniel Hunter (MAS)	6.78
7	Trương Doãn Hưng (VIE)	6.48
8	Samarth Anil Gaikwad (IND)	4.88

==== Boys' recognized ====
23 October

Round of 16
Gao Zixuan (CHN)	8.06
Keshan Warnakulasooriya (SRI)	7.45
Trương Doãn Hưng (VIE)	7.90
Amgalangiin Amar (MGL)	7.97
Tahib Hossan Osman (BAN)	7.49
Debasish Das (IND)	8.07
Hsieh Min-yu (TPE)	8.43
Lee Sa-bin (KOR)	8.32
Behdad Naghiei (IRI)	8.51
Caleb Angelo Calde (PHI)	8.39
Pongsakorn Thongdee (THA)	8.13
Wong Cheuk Yin (HKG)	7.99

Quarterfinals
Muhammad Zohaib Qadri (PAK)	7.90
Gao Zixuan (CHN)	8.10
Amgalangiin Amar (MGL)	8.00
Debasish Das (IND)	8.22
Hsieh Min-yu (TPE)	8.51
Behdad Naghiei (IRI)	8.56
Pongsakorn Thongdee (THA)	8.41
Anuwath Sarat (MAS)	8.30

Semifinals
Gao Zixuan (CHN)	8.54
Debasish Das (IND)	8.51
Behdad Naghiei (IRI)	8.69
Pongsakorn Thongdee (THA)	8.54

Final
Gao Zixuan (CHN)	8.48
Behdad Naghiei (IRI)	8.76

==== Girls' freestyle ====
23 October

Rank	Athlete	Score
1st place, gold medalist(s)	Pan Hsiao-ching (TPE)	7.50
2nd place, silver medalist(s)	Zhang Mengyuan (CHN)	7.28
3rd place, bronze medalist(s)	Sana Shaygan (IRI)	6.90
3rd place, bronze medalist(s)	Tiffany Sia (MAS)	6.74
5	Trần Mai Anh (VIE)	6.54
6	Ademi Samurbekova (KGZ)	5.88
7	Akshara Pramod Shanbhag (IND)	4.56
8	Phinphana Buakaeo (THA)	2.68

==== Girls' recognized ====
23 October

Round of 32
Suchanan Injang (THA)	8.20–8.25	Lin Chieh-en (TPE)

Round of 16
Trần Mai Anh (VIE)	7.48
Lin Chieh-en (TPE)	8.27
Bonu Temirova (TJK)	7.16
Myeong Se-hui (KOR)	8.31
Cheung Lok Ching (HKG)	8.12
Baigaldalain Soyonoo (MGL)	7.53
Gwen Koh (SGP)	8.13
Zeinab Shahriari (IRI)	8.40
Kaneez Zainab (PAK)	7.76
Datkaiym Aibekova (KGZ)	7.84
Kristen Aguila (PHI)	8.17
Suha Rayefa Syeed (BAN)	7.40
Li Yuqi (CHN)	8.08
Nabila Putri Permana (INA)	8.02
Amini Laa (IND)	8.02
Vishmi Nethara (SRI)	7.51

Quarterfinals
Lin Chieh-en (TPE)	8.41
Myeong Se-hui (KOR)	8.26
Cheung Lok Ching (HKG)	8.20
Zeinab Shahriari (IRI)	8.47
Datkaiym Aibekova (KGZ)	8.14
Kristen Aguila (PHI)	8.44
Li Yuqi (CHN)	8.38
Amini Laa (IND)	8.25

Semifinals
Lin Chieh-en (TPE)	8.44
Zeinab Shahriari (IRI)	8.62
Kristen Aguila (PHI)	8.52
Li Yuqi (CHN)	8.51

Final
Zeinab Shahriari (IRI)	8.86
Kristen Aguila (PHI)	8.60

==== Mixed pair freestyle ====
23 October

Rank	Team	Score
1st place, gold medalist(s)	Thailand (THA); Sakwarin Opachat; Rinrada Numthongthai	7.34
2nd place, silver medalist(s)	China (CHN); Wang Zhihao; Zhang Mengyuan	7.24
3rd place, bronze medalist(s)	Iran (IRI); Mohammad Amin Habibzadeh; Sana Shaygan	6.88
3rd place, bronze medalist(s)	Chinese Taipei (TPE); Yeh Bing-hsuan; Hsu Hsiang-chu	6.82
5	Philippines (PHI); Aeden Roffer Cereño; Andria Margaret Palabrica	6.82
6	Vietnam (VIE); Trương Doãn Hưng; Trần Mai Anh	6.74
7	India (IND); Aryan Aniruddha Joshi; Akshara Pramod Shanbhag	2.48

==== Mixed pair recognized ====
23 October

Round of 16
Nitikon Yimprasert (THA); Suchanan Injang (THA)	8.23
Wong Cheuk Yin (HKG); Cheung Lok Ching (HKG)	8.01
Trương Doãn Hưng (VIE); Trần Mai Anh (VIE)	7.71
Baigaldalain Taeyang (MGL); Baigaldalain Soyonoo (MGL)	7.64
Tahib Hossan Osman (BAN); Suha Rayefa Syeed (BAN)	7.58
Lee Min-chun (TPE); Liou Yan (TPE)	8.28
Behdad Naghiei (IRI); Zeinab Shahriari (IRI)	8.45
Muhammad Zohaib Qadri (PAK); Kaneez Zainab (PAK)	7.78

Quarterfinals
Alfonzo Tormon (PHI); Angel Lyn Dacanay (PHI)	8.43
Nitikon Yimprasert (THA); Suchanan Injang (THA)	8.50
Trương Doãn Hưng (VIE); Trần Mai Anh (VIE)	7.79
Shivanshu Patel (IND); Yashwini Singh (IND)	8.01
Gao Zixuan (CHN); Li Yuqi (CHN)	8.44
Lee Min-chun (TPE); Liou Yan (TPE)	8.57
Behdad Naghiei (IRI); Zeinab Shahriari (IRI)	8.65
Lee Sa-bin (KOR); Myeong Se-hui (KOR)	8.52

Semifinals
Nitikon Yimprasert (THA); Suchanan Injang (THA)	8.56
Shivanshu Patel (IND); Yashwini Singh (IND)	8.12
Lee Min-chun (TPE); Liou Yan (TPE)	8.61
Behdad Naghiei (IRI); Zeinab Shahriari (IRI)	8.63

Final
Nitikon Yimprasert (THA); Suchanan Injang (THA)	8.69
Behdad Naghiei (IRI); Zeinab Shahriari (IRI)	8.78

=== Kyorugi ===
==== Boys' 48 kg ====
24 October

Round of 32
Seng Mengchhun (CAM)	2–1 (3–10, 11–11, 16–15)	Saif Ullah (PAK)
Waleed Al-Mutairi (KUW)	0–2 (6–14, 5–7)	Back Gyeong-min (KOR)
You Sheng-yu (TPE)	0–2 (6–7, 3–6)	Tejas Yadav (IND)
Khalid Al-Shahrani (KSA)	2–0 (9^{P}–11, 9–3)	Taha Javadi (IRI)
Pan Yuhan (CHN)	2–0 (12–10, 12–0)	Muaadh Mabkhot Nejad (YEM)
Azizbek Sattorov (UZB)	2–0 (10–3, 10–3)	Phongsakorn Som Phong (MAS)
Bogdan Piagai (KGZ)	0–2 (3–5, 3–4)	Juan Victorio Yamat (PHI)
Abdallah Shahin (JOR)	2–0 (13–1, 5–4)	Riato Kawai (JPN)
Audrey Davin Fulvian (INA)	2–0 (21^{P}–9, 16–10)	Zeyad Al-Balushi (OMA)

Round of 16
Bakhtiyor Bedimogov (TJK)	1	5
Seng Mengchhun (CAM)	3	9
Back Gyeong-min (KOR)	11	6
Panuwat Kasemsin (THA)	12	8
Tejas Yadav (IND)	2	4
Khalid Al-Shahrani (KSA)	14	4
Pan Yuhan (CHN)	9	14
Lê Phan Tuấn Kiệt (VIE)	1	4
Bunyad Bakhramkulov (KAZ)	13	3
Azizbek Sattorov (UZB)	8	3
Juan Victorio Yamat (PHI)	D	Q
Ahmed Khamis (UAE)
Yousif Qambar (BRN)	7	3
Abdallah Shahin (JOR)	13	15
Audrey Davin Fulvian (INA)	9	18
Batkhüügiin Tögsbileg (MGL)	6	10

Quarterfinals
Seng Mengchhun (CAM)	9	4
Panuwat Kasemsin (THA)	15	12
Khalid Al-Shahrani (KSA)	1	4	7
Pan Yuhan (CHN)	0	12	9
Bunyad Bakhramkulov (KAZ)	3	10	12
Juan Victorio Yamat (PHI)	3	1	7
Abdallah Shahin (JOR)	13	13
Audrey Davin Fulvian (INA)	1	6

Semifinals
Panuwat Kasemsin (THA)	14	9
Pan Yuhan (CHN)	5	6
Bunyad Bakhramkulov (KAZ)	4	4
Abdallah Shahin (JOR)	4	9

Final
Panuwat Kasemsin (THA)	13^{P}	11^{P}
Abdallah Shahin (JOR)	2	8

==== Boys' 55 kg ====
26 October

Round of 32
Ashen Punchihewa (SRI)	0–2 (1–13, 1–5^{P})	Abdujafari Bahodur (TJK)
Qaboos Al-Bulushi (OMA)	0–2 (3–5, 2–9)	Kouga Notani (JPN)
Mohamed Yassine Bali (QAT)	2–0 (10–7, 9–5)	Nelio Martins (TLS)
Kea Sokthea (CAM)	0–2 (4–16, 3–16)	Mohammed Al-Mohammedsaleh (KSA)
Javis Yap (SGP)	0–2 (4–7, 2–12)	Asadbek Samandarov (UZB)
Enkhtaivany Anand (MGL)	2–0 (14–2, 9–7)	Cheung Shun (HKG)
Ahmad Al-Rababah (JOR)	DQ	Rye Al-Kaysan (INA)
Pongsakon Phalak (THA)	2–0 (7–4, 16–3)	Vladimir Li (KGZ)
Luo Hao-en (TPE)	0–2 (2–13, 2–11)	Yevgeniy Vassenkin (KAZ)
Matt Rejhan Lavestre (PHI)	2–0 (12–3, 4–3)	Aidil Hakim Azman (MAS)

Round of 16
Bahamin Poustindouz (IRI)	10	7
Abdujafari Bahodur (TJK)	16	12
Kouga Notani (JPN)	2	12
Yousef Al-Assa (PLE)	2	0
Mohamed Yassine Bali (QAT)	12	1
Mohammed Al-Mohammedsaleh (KSA)	15	13
Asadbek Samandarov (UZB)	7	9
Rajan Kumar (IND)	1	1
Mosaab Al-Masaudi (KUW)	1	0
Enkhtaivany Anand (MGL)	12	12
Ahmad Al-Rababah (JOR)	17	14
Pongsakon Phalak (THA)	4	1
Chen Changyou (CHN)	3	1
Yevgeniy Vassenkin (KAZ)	7	11
Matt Rejhan Lavestre (PHI)	13	12
Yousuf Haji (BRN)	1	0

Quarterfinals
Abdujafari Bahodur (TJK)	17	14
Kouga Notani (JPN)	10	2
Mohammed Al-Mohammedsaleh (KSA)	2	1
Asadbek Samandarov (UZB)	10	14
Enkhtaivany Anand (MGL)	14	0	7
Ahmad Al-Rababah (JOR)	12	12	10
Yevgeniy Vassenkin (KAZ)	8^{P}	16^{P}
Matt Rejhan Lavestre (PHI)	2	5

Semifinals
Abdujafari Bahodur (TJK)	0	3
Asadbek Samandarov (UZB)	12	12
Ahmad Al-Rababah (JOR)	0	4
Yevgeniy Vassenkin (KAZ)	12	17

Final
Asadbek Samandarov (UZB)	4	3
Yevgeniy Vassenkin (KAZ)	16	7^{P}

==== Boys' 63 kg ====
26 October

Round of 32
Amir Eghbali (IRI)	2–0 (11–6, 14–0)	Lam Kwun Yin (HKG)
Ahmad Al-Dahamsheh (JOR)	2–0 (12–0, 8–8)	Kenan Al-Raimi (YEM)
Zhang Cheng-han (TPE)	0–2 (1–7, 2–6)	Liu Haoran (CHN)
Sayed Abdullah (PAK)	0–2 (13–16, 9–12)	Nihal Dewali (IND)
Sosuke Ono (JPN)	2–0 (15^{P}–14, 10^{P}–1)	Ahmad Al-Ali (KUW)
Omadbek Otabekov (UZB)	2–0 (9–3, 9–7)	Jakravee Busawong (THA)
Abdul Basit Sofizada (AFG)	1–2 (7–2, 13–13, 0–11^{P})	Al-Muatasim Al-Maskari (OMA)
Kavka Zhafif Putrawitama (INA)	2–0 (12–0, 12–0)	Pasanjaya Ranasinghe (SRI)
Marwan Mohamed (UAE)	2–0 (10^{P}–5, 8^{P}–4)	Mahmoud Krayyem (SYR)

Round of 16
Hassan Mohsen (BRN)	0	4
Amir Eghbali (IRI)	12	16
Ahmad Al-Dahamsheh (JOR)	2	9
Nurali Makhmut (KAZ)	7	15
Liu Haoran (CHN)	4	13	7
Nihal Dewali (IND)	8	9	5
Sosuke Ono (JPN)	5	8
Abdulmohsen Al-Shuwaybi (KSA)	7	14
Park Si-chan (KOR)	4	7	0
Omadbek Otabekov (UZB)	3	14	5
Al-Muatasim Al-Maskari (OMA)	3	0	1
Tümniimagnaigiin Temüülen (MGL)	2	2	3
Amir Chynybaev (KGZ)	6	5
Kavka Zhafif Putrawitama (INA)	11	12
Marwan Mohamed (UAE)	3	9	7
Chuck Aeron Alariao (PHI)	5	5	9^{P}

Quarterfinals
Amir Eghbali (IRI)	6	5
Nurali Makhmut (KAZ)	16	10
Liu Haoran (CHN)	4	4
Abdulmohsen Al-Shuwaybi (KSA)	3	1
Omadbek Otabekov (UZB)	6	13
Tümniimagnaigiin Temüülen (MGL)	0	0
Kavka Zhafif Putrawitama (INA)	8	7	16
Chuck Aeron Alariao (PHI)	5	7	10

Semifinals
Nurali Makhmut (KAZ)	7	11
Liu Haoran (CHN)	4	6
Omadbek Otabekov (UZB)	5	15	13
Kavka Zhafif Putrawitama (INA)	9	3	1

Final
Nurali Makhmut (KAZ)	9	12	5
Omadbek Otabekov (UZB)	4	12	5

==== Boys' 73 kg ====
25 October

Round of 32
Chen Min-jun (TPE)	2–1 (7–4, 4–6, 10–3)	Anantasin Kajaroen (THA)

Round of 16
Yousef Al-Shammari (KUW)	0	4
Thanoj Sai Reddy (IND)	14	13^{P}
Mohammad Javad Geryan (IRI)	16	13
Martin Cheng (HKG)	1	1
Naranboldyn Ariunbold (MGL)	0	6
Zhanaibek Shamuratov (KAZ)	3	9
Chen Min-jun (TPE)	6	7	6
Wang Wenjun (CHN)	7	0	2
Yahya Omar (UAE)	8	8
Abdalhadi Farajallah (PLE)	12	12
Abdulaziz Al-Amiri (BRN)	2	0
Sodais Sekandar (AFG)	3	1
Akhadjon Mukhtorov (UZB)	6	4
Nawaf Hussain (KSA)	2	3
Lhord Jared Pasaron (PHI)	0	3
Laith Dakhlallah (JOR)	0	5

Quarterfinals
Thanoj Sai Reddy (IND)	2	3
Mohammad Javad Geryan (IRI)	5	9
Zhanaibek Shamuratov (KAZ)	1	8
Chen Min-jun (TPE)	0	0
Abdalhadi Farajallah (PLE)	4	8
Sodais Sekandar (AFG)	2	6
Akhadjon Mukhtorov (UZB)	13	6
Laith Dakhlallah (JOR)	0	4

Semifinals
Mohammad Javad Geryan (IRI)	0	2	2
Zhanaibek Shamuratov (KAZ)	1	0	3
Abdalhadi Farajallah (PLE)	0	5
Akhadjon Mukhtorov (UZB)	4	6

Final
Zhanaibek Shamuratov (KAZ)	3	4
Akhadjon Mukhtorov (UZB)	4	6

==== Boys' +73 kg ====
24 October

Round of 32
Mohammad Salmi (JOR)	2–0 (13–1, 8–0)	Yousif Khesrawi (BRN)
Mohammad Hossein Taghipour (IRI)	RSC (12–8, 2–5, 0–1)	Yegor Shaptefrats (KAZ)
Mohammad Bin Sultan (KUW)	1–2 (10–1, 4–9, 5–5)	Raphael Kylle Gaupo (PHI)

Round of 16
Hamdan Ali Saeed (UAE)	1	1
Hardik Ahlawat (IND)	2	4
Trần Hồ Nhân Văn (VIE)	5	10
Shi Buwu (CHN)	0	2
Eom Sim-ok (KOR)	5	11
Edison Liu (HKG)	2	4
Mohammad Salmi (JOR)	5	15
Erbol Eshimbekov (KGZ)	3	0
Yap Ren Ken (MAS)	0	5	1
Yegor Shaptefrats (KAZ)	3	3	9^{P}
Tarun Singhal (THA)	4	10
Bat-Erdeniin Belgütei (MGL)	6	10
Yusef Al-Madawi (KSA)	0	0	3
Yang Ren-you (TPE)	2	0	5
Raphael Kylle Gaupo (PHI)	0	2
Dzhonibek Nigmatov (TJK)	12	8

Quarterfinals
Hardik Ahlawat (IND)	2	2
Trần Hồ Nhân Văn (VIE)	6	6
Eom Sim-ok (KOR)	14	12
Mohammad Salmi (JOR)	4	4
Yegor Shaptefrats (KAZ)	5	5	3
Bat-Erdeniin Belgütei (MGL)	5	5	7
Yang Ren-you (TPE)	2	0
Dzhonibek Nigmatov (TJK)	11	3

Semifinals
Trần Hồ Nhân Văn (VIE)	4	3
Eom Sim-ok (KOR)	8	9
Bat-Erdeniin Belgütei (MGL)	4	4
Dzhonibek Nigmatov (TJK)	16	4

Final
Eom Sim-ok (KOR)	8	8
Dzhonibek Nigmatov (TJK)	1	2

==== Girls' 44 kg ====
24 October

Round of 32
Nurul Izzah Zatul Ikram (MAS)	0–2 (0–7, 0–9)	Bahar Tahmasebi (IRI)
Chia Kawabe (JPN)	1–2 (2–5, 9^{P}–5, 0–3)	Hafiza Sadyrova (KGZ)
Bat-Erdeniin Nomin (MGL)	2–0 (5–4, 8–2)	Heng Malis (CAM)
Salsabilla Ramadhani (INA)	0–2 (0–0, 2–9)	Aiym Serikbayeva (KAZ)
Lai Yi-jhen (TPE)	0–2 (2–9, 1–9)	Phetchadaporn Patnanthahirun (THA)

Round of 16
Liu Huiting (CHN)	10	4	9
Bahar Tahmasebi (IRI)	7	5	9
Hafiza Sadyrova (KGZ)	5	3
Fatima Al-Abdallat (JOR)	7	8
Shehnaz Al-Maawali (OMA)	8	14
Shaikha Al-Yaqoob (BRN)	1	2
Bat-Erdeniin Nomin (MGL)	4	1
Hoàng Thị Thu Huyền (VIE)	7	9
Rayan Obaid (UAE)	0	0
Aiym Serikbayeva (KAZ)	6	12
Felicity Jana Castel (PHI)	4	4
Rabboniya Ruslanova (UZB)	3	1
Anisa Kantaeva (TJK)	4	7
Law Pui Yi (HKG)	1	1
Phetchadaporn Patnanthahirun (THA)	10	9^{P}
Rishita Rawat (IND)	0	0

Quarterfinals
Bahar Tahmasebi (IRI)	8	2
Fatima Al-Abdallat (JOR)	9	10
Shehnaz Al-Maawali (OMA)	1	3
Hoàng Thị Thu Huyền (VIE)	3	6
Aiym Serikbayeva (KAZ)	5	10
Felicity Jana Castel (PHI)	0	0
Anisa Kantaeva (TJK)	0	0
Phetchadaporn Patnanthahirun (THA)	4	14

Semifinals
Fatima Al-Abdallat (JOR)	4	2
Hoàng Thị Thu Huyền (VIE)	12	3
Aiym Serikbayeva (KAZ)	2	6	12
Phetchadaporn Patnanthahirun (THA)	0	10	0

Final
Hoàng Thị Thu Huyền (VIE)	0	12
Aiym Serikbayeva (KAZ)	5	20

==== Girls' 49 kg ====
25 October

Round of 32
Bonu Temirova (TJK)	2–0 (5–2, 16–0)	Delgerchuluuny Egshiglen (MGL)
Nuttagun Tongkhunnatham (THA)	1–2 (3–2, 0–4, 2–3)	Lee Si-woo (KOR)
Nana Kawashima (JPN)	2–0 (4–0, 6–3)	Clare Wong (HKG)
Helia Ebrahimian (IRI)	DQ	Rhiyanne Cadileña (PHI)
Wang Chieh-ling (TPE)	2–0 (11–4, 12–0)	Ankitha Navyakanth (IND)
Laean Al-Rawashdeh (JOR)	2–0 (6–5, 9–2)	Daiana Kudaibergenova (KGZ)

Round of 16
Fedaa Al-Barwani (OMA)	3	2
Bonu Temirova (TJK)	7	2
Lee Si-woo (KOR)	2	6
Bisan Salim (PLE)	1	3
Siera Pinto (TLS)	0	0
Nurailym Bakytzhankyzy (KAZ)	5	8
Nana Kawashima (JPN)	1	0
Queenita Keisha Azzahra (INA)	1	12
Savidya Ritigahapola (SRI)	0	0
Helia Ebrahimian (IRI)	12	12
Li Mixue (CHN)	14	12
Lara Matar (KSA)	0	0
Lasang Dolma Tamang (BHU)	0	1
Wang Chieh-ling (TPE)	13	13
Laean Al-Rawashdeh (JOR)	12^{P}	13
Jana Sidawi (IND)	0	1

Quarterfinals
Bonu Temirova (TJK)	0	2
Lee Si-woo (KOR)	11	6
Nurailym Bakytzhankyzy (KAZ)	0	0
Queenita Keisha Azzahra (INA)	5	1
Helia Ebrahimian (IRI)	4	1
Li Mixue (CHN)	10	10
Wang Chieh-ling (TPE)	7	7
Laean Al-Rawashdeh (JOR)	0	5

Semifinals
Lee Si-woo (KOR)	3	1	8
Queenita Keisha Azzahra (INA)	1	2	3
Li Mixue (CHN)	4	8
Wang Chieh-ling (TPE)	0	4

Final
Lee Si-woo (KOR)	3	1
Li Mixue (CHN)	12	15

==== Girls' 55 kg ====
25 October

Round of 32
Shaikha Saeed Al-Ketbi (UAE)	2–1 (9–6, 13–26, 11–8)	Mey Nur Hafidzha (MAS)

Round of 16
Nazgul Teshabaeva (KGZ)	7	2	6
Princess Pascual (PHI)	5	4	4
Gharam Kaabi (KSA)	0	2
Rania Taqatqa (JOR)	6	3
Rushanakhon Ravshanova (UZB)	6	8
Alina Issayeva (KAZ)	0	2
Shaikha Saeed Al-Ketbi (UAE)	0	1
Tsao Ming-ting (TPE)	8	8
Pang Chiu Wing (HKG)	0	1
Xu Wanlin (CHN)	8^{P}	13
Dhanashree Pawar (IND)	0	0
Battserengiin Mönkhjin (MGL)	8	9
Choi Kun-young (KOR)	0	3
Dina Babarahim (IRI)	9	5
Nattamonkarn Tamanit (THA)	15	11
Kyoko Kayama (JPN)	2	4

Quarterfinals
Nazgul Teshabaeva (KGZ)	0	2	0
Rania Taqatqa (JOR)	8	1	3
Rushanakhon Ravshanova (UZB)	9	8
Tsao Ming-ting (TPE)	1	0
Xu Wanlin (CHN)	4	11
Battserengiin Mönkhjin (MGL)	0	3
Dina Babarahim (IRI)	2	6
Nattamonkarn Tamanit (THA)	0	0

Semifinals
Rania Taqatqa (JOR)	0	0
Rushanakhon Ravshanova (UZB)	0	3
Xu Wanlin (CHN)	6	8
Dina Babarahim (IRI)	2	2

Final
Rushanakhon Ravshanova (UZB)	2	9
Xu Wanlin (CHN)	0	8

==== Girls' 63 kg ====
26 October

Round of 16
Mohidil Uktamjonova (UZB)	7	3
Dominika Chernetskaia (KGZ)	5	0
Chou Ko-yi-chun (TPE)	6	9
Lyubov Yun (KAZ)	1	1
Zlata Chaykun (SGP)	1	0
Pinar Lotfizadeh (IRI)	10	13
Gharluxmi Phurailatpam (IND)	7	15
Renad Al-Bishi (KSA)	2	6

Quarterfinals
Mohidil Uktamjonova (UZB)	0	2
Chou Ko-yi-chun (TPE)	2	7
Guo Ruyue (CHN)	0	0	4
Jidapa Ngoenbukkhon (THA)	0	0	3
EJ Gaa (PHI)	0	0
Pinar Lotfizadeh (IRI)	6	13
Gharluxmi Phurailatpam (IND)	5	7	4
Zainab Busila (JOR)	11	7	8

Semifinals
Chou Ko-yi-chun (TPE)	0	3
Guo Ruyue (CHN)	6	4
Pinar Lotfizadeh (IRI)	4	7
Zainab Busila (JOR)	3	4

Final
Guo Ruyue (CHN)	6	3	3
Pinar Lotfizadeh (IRI)	0	4	0

==== Girls' +63 kg ====
24 October

Round of 16
Prisha Shetty (IND)	2	4	3
Sabina Turtulova (KAZ)	6	2	2
Asal Goltappeh (IRI)	5	4	10
Feruza Ernazarova (UZB)	4	5	2
Lama Al-Bqowr (JOR)	4	4
Mary Heart Capulong (PHI)	3	3
Leen Al-Yousef (KSA)	1	0
Vissha Selvamuthu (MAS)	5	9
Mönkhzulyn Ülemj (MGL)	2	6
Bùi Mai Phương (VIE)	6	11
Aysha Abdulkarim (BRN)	6	1
Wang Shu-shian (TPE)	7	7

Quarterfinals
Prisha Shetty (IND)	0	0
Asal Goltappeh (IRI)	13	12
Lama Al-Bqowr (JOR)	8	0	1
Settreeyada Prungtong (THA)	1	1	0
Zhang Qing (CHN)	6	16
Vissha Selvamuthu (MAS)	0	3
Bùi Mai Phương (VIE)	0	0	2
Wang Shu-shian (TPE)	3	0	1

Semifinals
Asal Goltappeh (IRI)	6	7
Lama Al-Bqowr (JOR)	0	0
Zhang Qing (CHN)	7	6
Bùi Mai Phương (VIE)	1	0

Final
Asal Goltappeh (IRI)	2	0
Zhang Qing (CHN)	3	0

==== Mixed team ====
26 October

Round of 16
Vietnam
Iran	D	Q
Hong Kong	5	14
India	29	26
South Korea	11	16
Thailand	15	23

Quarterfinals
Jordan	6	10
China	39	22
Iran	11	17	24
Uzbekistan	19	7	10
Saudi Arabia	28	17	9
India	32	15	11
Thailand	3	16	14
Chinese Taipei	13	13	13

Semifinals
China	12	13	16
Iran	10	16	9
India	4	2
Thailand	6	18

Final
China	14	19
Thailand	5	4
