= Weightlifting at the 2025 Asian Youth Games =

- Venue: Exhibition World Bahrain
- Dates: 26–30 October 2025

Weightlifting at the 2025 Asian Youth Games was held in Sakhir, Bahrain from 26 to 30 October 2025 at the Exhibition World Bahrain.

== Medalists ==
=== Boys' snatch ===
Event	Gold	Silver	Bronze
56 kg	Pak Kyong-song; North Korea	Hoshina Ameku; Japan	Hùng Văn Thế; Vietnam
60 kg	Chen Xunfa; China	Maharajan Arumugapandian; India	Ayu Higa; Japan
65 kg	Choe Jin-myong; North Korea	Beibarys Yerseit; Kazakhstan	Abdullah Al-Mohaimeed; Saudi Arabia
71 kg	Alikhan Askerbay; Kazakhstan	Chen Xingxing; China	Hayotbek Ermatov; Uzbekistan
79 kg	Nurzhan Zhumabay; Kazakhstan	Adrián Bonilla; Bahrain	Didarbek Jumabaýew; Turkmenistan
88 kg	Munisbek Davletov; Uzbekistan	Mousa Khudhair; Iraq	Wang Jianghao; China
94 kg	Jhon Murillo; Bahrain	Abbosbek Akhrolov; Uzbekistan	Yslam Akmyradow; Turkmenistan
+94 kg	Khasanboy Kholmuratov; Uzbekistan	Lee Dong-hoon; South Korea	Hossein Yazdani; Iran

=== Boys' clean & jerk ===
Event	Gold	Silver	Bronze
56 kg	Jiang Jinfu; China	Mohammed Al-Ojaian; Saudi Arabia	Jay-r Colonia; Philippines
60 kg	Muhamad Rijal Abdilah; Indonesia	Maharajan Arumugapandian; India	Chen Xunfa; China
65 kg	Nguyễn Thành Duy; Vietnam	Wang Bohang; China	Beibarys Yerseit; Kazakhstan
71 kg	Alikhan Askerbay; Kazakhstan	Chen Xingxing; China	Kim Ha-jun; South Korea
79 kg	Didarbek Jumabaýew; Turkmenistan	Nurzhan Zhumabay; Kazakhstan	Xiao Ao; China
88 kg	Munisbek Davletov; Uzbekistan	Mousa Khudhair; Iraq	Behnoud Nosrati; Iran
94 kg	Jhon Murillo; Bahrain	Yslam Akmyradow; Turkmenistan	Parv Choudhary; India
+94 kg	Hossein Yazdani; Iran	Lee Dong-hoon; South Korea	Saparbaý Atajanow; Turkmenistan

=== Girls' snatch ===
Event	Gold	Silver	Bronze
44 kg	Wu Jihong; China	Priteesmita Bhoi; India	Đào Thị Yến; Vietnam
48 kg	Lan Xinyi; China	Kim Ju-gyong; North Korea	Munisa Odilova; Uzbekistan
53 kg	Pak Hae-yon; North Korea	Jhodie Peralta; Philippines	Y Liên; Vietnam
58 kg	Marjona Abdumutalova; Uzbekistan	Kanittha Saetang; Thailand	Zhang Xinyi; China
63 kg	Zhu Caiyun; China	Xeniya Prozorova; Kazakhstan	Sarvinoz Kupaysinova; Uzbekistan
69 kg	Ri Sae-byol; North Korea	Shakhnoza Khaydarova; Uzbekistan	Zahra Hosseini; Iran
77 kg	Dilnura Kholdorova; Uzbekistan	Nasim Ghasemi; Iran	Alyamaulida Kartika Pertiwi; Indonesia
+77 kg	Hu Wenxun; China	Kim Che-ryang; South Korea	Mahsa Beheshti; Iran

=== Girls' clean & jerk ===
Event	Gold	Silver	Bronze
44 kg	Priteesmita Bhoi; India	Wu Jihong; China	Princess Jay Ann Diaz; Philippines
48 kg	Lan Xinyi; China	Kim Ju-gyong; North Korea	Alexandra Diaz; Philippines
53 kg	Pak Hae-yon; North Korea	Y Liên; Vietnam	Jhodie Peralta; Philippines
58 kg	Marjona Abdumutalova; Uzbekistan	Zhang Xinyi; China	Nursyila Berikbol; Kazakhstan
63 kg	Zhu Caiyun; China	Xeniya Prozorova; Kazakhstan	Hasti Sedighi; Iran
69 kg	Ri Sae-byol; North Korea	Meng Sitong; China	Zahra Hosseini; Iran
77 kg	Dilnura Kholdorova; Uzbekistan	Nasim Ghasemi; Iran	Alyamaulida Kartika Pertiwi; Indonesia
+77 kg	Hu Wenxun; China	Kim Che-ryang; South Korea	Mohinur Esonboeva; Uzbekistan

== Medal table ==
Rank	Nation	Gold	Silver	Bronze	Total
1	China (CHN)	9	6	4	19
2	Uzbekistan (UZB)	7	2	4	13
3	North Korea (PRK)	6	2	0	8
4	Kazakhstan (KAZ)	3	4	2	9
5	Bahrain (BRN)	2	1	0	3
6	India (IND)	1	3	1	5
7	Iran (IRI)	1	2	6	9
8	Turkmenistan (TKM)	1	1	3	5
8	Vietnam (VIE)	1	1	3	5
10	Indonesia (INA)	1	0	2	3
11	South Korea (KOR)	0	4	1	5
12	Iraq (IRQ)	0	2	0	2
13	Philippines (PHI)	0	1	4	5
14	Japan (JPN)	0	1	1	2
14	Saudi Arabia (KSA)	0	1	1	2
16	Thailand (THA)	0	1	0	1
Totals (16 entries)		32	32	32	96

== Results ==
=== Boys ===
==== 56 kg ====
26 October

Athlete	Group	Snatch (kg)					Clean & Jerk (kg)					Total
Athlete	Group	1	2	3	Result	Rank	1	2	3	Result	Rank	Total
Jiang Jinfu (CHN)	A	103	110	~~114~~	110	5	135	141	~~143~~	141	1st place, gold medalist(s)	251
Pak Kyong-song (PRK)	A	108	112	~~115~~	112	1st place, gold medalist(s)	~~130~~	130	136	136	4	248
Jay-r Colonia (PHI)	A	101	106	111	111	4	133	137	~~142~~	137	3rd place, bronze medalist(s)	248
Mohammed Al-Ojaian (KSA)	A	106	110	~~113~~	110	6	134	138	~~142~~	138	2nd place, silver medalist(s)	248
Hùng Văn Thế (VIE)	A	107	111	~~114~~	111	3rd place, bronze medalist(s)	132	~~137~~	~~139~~	132	6	243
Hoshina Ameku (JPN)	A	105	~~110~~	112	112	2nd place, silver medalist(s)	123	128	~~131~~	128	8	240
Kevin Andrian Ramadhan (INA)	A	103	108	~~113~~	108	7	130	~~135~~	~~139~~	130	7	238
Dharmajyoti Deogharia (IND)	A	98	~~102~~	~~102~~	98	10	~~125~~	125	133	133	5	231
Ali Ghanim (IRQ)	B	~~99~~	99	102	102	8	120	124	~~127~~	124	10	226
Turdubek Kalybekov (KGZ)	A	95	99	~~102~~	99	9	~~120~~	120	125	125	9	224
Saleh Al-Sadi (YEM)	B	55	~~60~~	60	60	12	70	77	84	84	12	144
Roeun Rady (CAM)	B	~~50~~	50	51	51	13	70	75	~~82~~	75	13	126
Haris Hasrul (MAS)	B	95	~~98~~	~~98~~	95	11	~~113~~	~~115~~	~~115~~	—	—	NM
Nutchanon Chadchay (THA)	B	~~98~~	~~98~~	~~98~~	—	—	~~118~~	118	121	121	11	NM

==== 60 kg ====
26 October

Athlete	Group	Snatch (kg)					Clean & Jerk (kg)					Total
Athlete	Group	1	2	3	Result	Rank	1	2	3	Result	Rank	Total
Chen Xunfa (CHN)	A	115	120	~~123~~	120	1st place, gold medalist(s)	136	141	~~144~~	141	3rd place, bronze medalist(s)	261
Maharajan Arumugapandian (IND)	A	114	~~118~~	~~121~~	114	2nd place, silver medalist(s)	~~141~~	142	~~144~~	142	2nd place, silver medalist(s)	256
Muhamad Rijal Abdilah (INA)	A	100	107	~~111~~	107	4	136	139	143	143	1st place, gold medalist(s)	250
Jerick Icon Castro (PHI)	A	105	~~110~~	~~111~~	105	5	133	137	~~140~~	137	4	242
Asilbek Boltaev (UZB)	A	100	~~104~~	~~104~~	100	7	123	127	131	131	6	231
Nurmamat Esenkeldiev (KGZ)	A	98	~~103~~	~~103~~	98	10	120	126	130	130	7	228
Ayu Higa (JPN)	A	106	110	~~116~~	110	3rd place, bronze medalist(s)	115	116	~~123~~	116	12	226
Thanodom Rakjan (THA)	B	93	96	99	99	8	122	~~127~~	~~127~~	122	8	221
Wang Yu-chun (TPE)	B	94	~~97~~	97	97	11	115	122	~~126~~	122	9	219
Atabek Azamatow (TKM)	B	95	98	100	100	6	111	115	118	118	10	218
Rida Al-Zawri (KSA)	A	99	~~103~~	~~103~~	99	9	~~118~~	118	~~124~~	118	11	217
Najmeddin Khattab (SYR)	B	~~80~~	~~80~~	80	80	13	100	107	111	111	13	191
Hak Somnangrithy (CAM)	B	75	80	82	82	12	100	103	108	108	14	190
Ahmad Darwisy Zharfan (MAS)	A	~~105~~	~~105~~	~~106~~	—	—	135	~~138~~	~~138~~	135	5	NM

==== 65 kg ====
27 October

Athlete	Group	Snatch (kg)					Clean & Jerk (kg)					Total
Athlete	Group	1	2	3	Result	Rank	1	2	3	Result	Rank	Total
Nguyễn Thành Duy (VIE)	A	~~118~~	120	~~124~~	120	4	~~152~~	153	156	156	1st place, gold medalist(s)	276
Beibarys Yerseit (KAZ)	A	~~118~~	119	123	123	2nd place, silver medalist(s)	147	~~152~~	152	152	3rd place, bronze medalist(s)	275
Choe Jin-myong (PRK)	A	121	~~123~~	124	124	1st place, gold medalist(s)	150	~~153~~	~~154~~	150	4	274
Abdullah Al-Mohaimeed (KSA)	A	118	122	~~124~~	122	3rd place, bronze medalist(s)	147	~~151~~	~~152~~	147	5	269
Leonard Imanuel Aipassa (INA)	A	110	116	~~120~~	116	5	140	146	~~151~~	146	6	262
Dave Angelo Pacaldo (PHI)	A	108	~~113~~	113	113	6	130	~~140~~	140	140	9	253
Ahmad Wazif Zafran (MAS)	A	108	~~111~~	112	112	7	~~139~~	~~139~~	140	140	8	252
Anik Modi (IND)	B	101	106	~~110~~	106	10	135	140	~~143~~	140	7	246
Arsen Sharipov (KGZ)	A	108	~~112~~	~~115~~	108	9	127	~~132~~	132	132	11	240
Venura Kariyawasam (SRI)	B	~~100~~	100	~~107~~	100	11	135	~~140~~	~~140~~	135	10	235
Mohammed Riyadh (IRQ)	B	~~105~~	105	108	108	8	~~123~~	124	~~130~~	124	12	232
Maruf Hossen (BAN)	B	90	95	~~100~~	95	12	115	~~118~~	118	118	13	213
Hussain Dawood Abdulla (BRN)	B	62	67	72	72	13	~~85~~	~~85~~	85	85	14	157
Wang Bohang (CHN)	A	~~116~~	~~116~~	~~116~~	—	—	151	155	~~157~~	155	2nd place, silver medalist(s)	NM

==== 71 kg ====
27 October

Athlete	Group	Snatch (kg)					Clean & Jerk (kg)					Total
Athlete	Group	1	2	3	Result	Rank	1	2	3	Result	Rank	Total
Alikhan Askerbay (KAZ)	A	137	142	144	144	1st place, gold medalist(s)	166	170	172	172	1st place, gold medalist(s)	316
Chen Xingxing (CHN)	A	136	~~141~~	143	143	2nd place, silver medalist(s)	~~167~~	~~168~~	171	171	2nd place, silver medalist(s)	314
Kakamyrat Annamyradow (TKM)	A	130	~~133~~	~~135~~	130	4	160	~~165~~	166	166	4	296
Ali Al-Hawar (KSA)	A	~~128~~	128	~~132~~	128	5	~~161~~	161	~~166~~	161	5	289
Kim Ha-jun (KOR)	A	110	121	~~126~~	121	8	160	165	167	167	3rd place, bronze medalist(s)	288
Hayotbek Ermatov (UZB)	A	126	131	~~136~~	131	3rd place, bronze medalist(s)	146	~~150~~	~~152~~	146	8	277
Abhinob Gogoi (IND)	A	120	125	~~128~~	125	6	147	~~152~~	152	152	6	277
Kongla Promduangsri (THA)	A	~~121~~	122	~~127~~	122	7	145	150	~~155~~	150	7	272
Ko Higa (JPN)	B	115	~~120~~	120	120	9	130	~~135~~	~~135~~	130	10	250
Akmatbek Tazhidinov (KGZ)	B	110	~~115~~	~~115~~	110	10	130	135	~~140~~	135	9	245
Ali Dabool (SYR)	B	85	90	95	95	11	107	~~115~~	115	115	11	210

==== 79 kg ====
29 October

Athlete	Group	Snatch (kg)					Clean & Jerk (kg)					Total
Athlete	Group	1	2	3	Result	Rank	1	2	3	Result	Rank	Total
Nurzhan Zhumabay (KAZ)	A	140	144	146	146	1st place, gold medalist(s)	171	176	~~179~~	176	2nd place, silver medalist(s)	322
Didarbek Jumabaýew (TKM)	A	134	138	~~143~~	138	3rd place, bronze medalist(s)	172	177	~~180~~	177	1st place, gold medalist(s)	315
Adrián Bonilla (BRN)	A	133	137	142	142	2nd place, silver medalist(s)	162	167	~~172~~	167	5	309
Xiao Ao (CHN)	A	126	132	136	136	4	164	~~171~~	172	172	3rd place, bronze medalist(s)	308
Sanatbek Yusubboev (UZB)	A	131	135	~~139~~	135	5	163	~~168~~	171	171	4	306
Wang Guan-xin (TPE)	A	125	~~131~~	~~132~~	125	6	155	160	~~165~~	160	6	285
Temirlan Zhakypbekov (KGZ)	A	117	~~121~~	~~121~~	117	7	143	~~148~~	~~148~~	143	9	260
Chutiphon Sapthomma (THA)	A	115	~~121~~	~~121~~	115	8	~~145~~	145	~~151~~	145	8	260
Mohammed Al-Saagh (YEM)	A	95	105	~~110~~	105	9	110	120	—	120	10	225
Saeed Al-Hajeri (UAE)	A	60	~~65~~	65	65	10	~~76~~	77	~~85~~	77	11	142
Md Rahim (BAN)	A	~~120~~	~~120~~	~~120~~	—	—	~~146~~	146	151	151	7	NM
Mehdi Pourghasemi (IRI)	A	~~128~~	~~133~~	~~136~~	—	—	~~150~~	~~155~~	—	—	—	NM

==== 88 kg ====
29 October

Athlete	Group	Snatch (kg)					Clean & Jerk (kg)					Total
Athlete	Group	1	2	3	Result	Rank	1	2	3	Result	Rank	Total
Munisbek Davletov (UZB)	A	143	146	—	146	1st place, gold medalist(s)	177	179	~~193~~	179	1st place, gold medalist(s)	325
Mousa Khudhair (IRQ)	A	145	~~148~~	~~148~~	145	2nd place, silver medalist(s)	~~174~~	174	178	178	2nd place, silver medalist(s)	323
Wang Jianghao (CHN)	A	~~143~~	~~144~~	144	144	3rd place, bronze medalist(s)	166	~~171~~	172	172	4	316
Kim Tae-yang (KOR)	A	130	136	143	143	4	160	168	~~172~~	168	5	311
Yernur Myrzakhmet (KAZ)	A	135	~~140~~	~~140~~	135	5	~~161~~	161	~~170~~	161	7	296
Nithika Vidanage (SRI)	A	108	114	~~118~~	114	6	140	~~150~~	~~150~~	140	8	254
Faisal Al-Ajmi (UAE)	A	~~45~~	~~45~~	47	47	7	~~65~~	65	~~70~~	65	9	112
Behnoud Nosrati (IRI)	A	~~145~~	~~147~~	~~147~~	—	—	~~169~~	~~172~~	173	173	3rd place, bronze medalist(s)	NM
Hajymyrat Gylyçmyradow (TKM)	A	~~133~~	~~135~~	~~136~~	—	—	165	~~171~~	~~172~~	165	6	NM

==== 94 kg ====
30 October

Athlete	Group	Snatch (kg)					Clean & Jerk (kg)					Total
Athlete	Group	1	2	3	Result	Rank	1	2	3	Result	Rank	Total
Jhon Murillo (BRN)	A	150	156	160	160	1st place, gold medalist(s)	~~180~~	181	186	186	1st place, gold medalist(s)	346
Yslam Akmyradow (TKM)	A	143	146	~~148~~	146	3rd place, bronze medalist(s)	~~180~~	180	185	185	2nd place, silver medalist(s)	331
Abbosbek Akhrolov (UZB)	A	~~144~~	144	147	147	2nd place, silver medalist(s)	~~170~~	170	~~182~~	170	5	317
Amin Adibi (IRI)	A	~~136~~	136	141	141	4	165	172	~~177~~	172	4	313
Ma Jun-wei (TPE)	A	110	115	~~122~~	115	5	145	~~151~~	~~151~~	145	6	260
Parv Choudhary (IND)	A	~~144~~	~~145~~	~~145~~	—	—	176	181	~~186~~	181	3rd place, bronze medalist(s)	NM

==== +94 kg ====
30 October

Athlete	Group	Snatch (kg)					Clean & Jerk (kg)					Total
Athlete	Group	1	2	3	Result	Rank	1	2	3	Result	Rank	Total
Lee Dong-hoon (KOR)	A	140	147	152	152	2nd place, silver medalist(s)	185	194	200	200	2nd place, silver medalist(s)	352
Hossein Yazdani (IRI)	A	143	~~149~~	151	151	3rd place, bronze medalist(s)	186	195	201	201	1st place, gold medalist(s)	352
Saparbaý Atajanow (TKM)	A	135	141	145	145	4	175	~~180~~	~~181~~	175	3rd place, bronze medalist(s)	320
Feng Chia-le (TPE)	A	120	125	128	128	6	140	150	~~160~~	150	5	278
Mohammad Zeitoun (LBN)	A	121	~~126~~	~~127~~	121	7	151	157	~~161~~	157	4	278
Ali Al-Hemeiri (UAE)	A	45	48	~~50~~	50	8	50	55	60	60	6	108
Khasanboy Kholmuratov (UZB)	A	~~148~~	148	153	153	1st place, gold medalist(s)	~~178~~	~~180~~	~~180~~	—	—	NM
Ahmed Al-Mahdi (KSA)	A	~~140~~	142	~~146~~	142	5	~~176~~	~~180~~	~~180~~	—	—	NM

=== Girls ===
==== 44 kg ====
26 October

Athlete	Group	Snatch (kg)					Clean & Jerk (kg)					Total
Athlete	Group	1	2	3	Result	Rank	1	2	3	Result	Rank	Total
Priteesmita Bhoi (IND)	A	66	~~68~~	~~69~~	66	2nd place, silver medalist(s)	87	90	92	92	1st place, gold medalist(s)	158
Wu Jihong (CHN)	A	62	65	68	68	1st place, gold medalist(s)	82	88	~~91~~	88	2nd place, silver medalist(s)	156
Đào Thị Yến (VIE)	A	~~64~~	64	~~67~~	64	3rd place, bronze medalist(s)	~~77~~	~~77~~	77	77	4	141
Princess Jay Ann Diaz (PHI)	A	~~62~~	~~63~~	63	63	4	78	~~83~~	~~83~~	78	3rd place, bronze medalist(s)	141
Jin Yeon-ji (KOR)	A	~~57~~	57	~~63~~	57	5	65	71	~~76~~	71	5	128
Phatcharapha Maenpuen (THA)	A	50	~~55~~	~~55~~	50	6	65	70	~~72~~	70	6	120
Begimai Abdygazieva (KGZ)	A	45	~~47~~	47	47	7	52	53	~~54~~	53	7	100

==== 48 kg ====
27 October

Athlete	Group	Snatch (kg)					Clean & Jerk (kg)					Total
Athlete	Group	1	2	3	Result	Rank	1	2	3	Result	Rank	Total
Lan Xinyi (CHN)	A	71	75	77	77	1st place, gold medalist(s)	90	93	—	93	1st place, gold medalist(s)	170
Kim Ju-gyong (PRK)	A	~~73~~	73	76	76	2nd place, silver medalist(s)	~~92~~	92	~~95~~	92	2nd place, silver medalist(s)	168
Alexandra Diaz (PHI)	A	70	~~73~~	~~73~~	70	4	88	90	92	92	3rd place, bronze medalist(s)	162
Munisa Odilova (UZB)	A	69	72	~~74~~	72	3rd place, bronze medalist(s)	~~88~~	89	~~92~~	89	6	161
Snezhana Kashkarova (KAZ)	A	~~69~~	70	~~73~~	70	5	86	~~90~~	91	91	4	161
Panadda Pormchat (THA)	A	~~65~~	~~65~~	69	69	6	86	89	~~91~~	89	5	158
Absyah Ramadhani Nasution (INA)	A	~~65~~	~~65~~	68	68	8	80	~~86~~	~~91~~	80	8	148
Zahra Pouramin (IRI)	A	60	64	~~68~~	64	9	78	81	~~85~~	81	7	145
Sumona Roy (BAN)	A	55	57	~~58~~	57	10	65	68	~~70~~	68	9	125
Tumara Zhaparova (KGZ)	A	46	48	~~50~~	48	11	~~57~~	~~57~~	57	57	10	105
Payal (IND)	A	68	~~71~~	~~72~~	68	7	—	—	—	—	—	NM

==== 53 kg ====
28 October

Athlete	Group	Snatch (kg)					Clean & Jerk (kg)					Total
Athlete	Group	1	2	3	Result	Rank	1	2	3	Result	Rank	Total
Pak Hae-yon (PRK)	A	84	86	88	88	1st place, gold medalist(s)	~~105~~	~~107~~	107	107	1st place, gold medalist(s)	195
Y Liên (VIE)	A	~~78~~	79	82	82	3rd place, bronze medalist(s)	~~106~~	~~106~~	106	106	2nd place, silver medalist(s)	188
Jhodie Peralta (PHI)	A	82	85	87	87	2nd place, silver medalist(s)	100	~~105~~	~~107~~	100	3rd place, bronze medalist(s)	187
Ogulşat Amanowa (TKM)	A	78	~~81~~	81	81	4	~~95~~	95	~~101~~	95	4	176
Waraphon Phakdihan (THA)	A	73	~~76~~	~~79~~	73	5	88	~~92~~	~~92~~	88	5	161
Aidai Amangeldieva (KGZ)	A	55	58	60	60	6	65	~~68~~	~~68~~	65	6	125
Zainab Husain (BRN)	A	45	50	52	52	7	55	60	65	65	7	117

==== 58 kg ====
28 October

Athlete	Group	Snatch (kg)					Clean & Jerk (kg)					Total
Athlete	Group	1	2	3	Result	Rank	1	2	3	Result	Rank	Total
Marjona Abdumutalova (UZB)	A	85	88	—	88	1st place, gold medalist(s)	102	108	111	111	1st place, gold medalist(s)	199
Zhang Xinyi (CHN)	A	83	~~86~~	~~89~~	83	3rd place, bronze medalist(s)	107	110	~~112~~	110	2nd place, silver medalist(s)	193
Nursyila Berikbol (KAZ)	A	~~77~~	77	80	80	4	95	~~101~~	101	101	3rd place, bronze medalist(s)	181
Brilianti Chandrika Sukmadewi (INA)	A	~~74~~	~~74~~	75	75	5	~~77~~	77	~~82~~	77	6	152
Ghazal Zarka (SYR)	A	65	70	~~75~~	70	6	75	80	~~85~~	80	5	150
Kanittha Saetang (THA)	A	81	84	86	86	2nd place, silver medalist(s)	~~100~~	~~100~~	~~101~~	—	—	NM
Maryam Keshtkar (IRI)	A	~~80~~	~~80~~	~~83~~	—	—	96	~~101~~	~~102~~	96	4	NM

==== 63 kg ====
28 October

Athlete	Group	Snatch (kg)					Clean & Jerk (kg)					Total
Athlete	Group	1	2	3	Result	Rank	1	2	3	Result	Rank	Total
Zhu Caiyun (CHN)	A	90	93	95	95	1st place, gold medalist(s)	106	111	~~115~~	111	1st place, gold medalist(s)	206
Xeniya Prozorova (KAZ)	A	88	91	94	94	2nd place, silver medalist(s)	108	~~112~~	~~112~~	108	2nd place, silver medalist(s)	202
Sarvinoz Kupaysinova (UZB)	A	81	84	~~89~~	84	3rd place, bronze medalist(s)	101	~~105~~	~~106~~	101	6	185
Hasti Sedighi (IRI)	A	78	~~81~~	~~82~~	78	5	~~104~~	105	~~107~~	105	3rd place, bronze medalist(s)	183
Lee Da-yeon (KOR)	A	~~79~~	79	~~82~~	79	4	~~100~~	102	~~106~~	102	5	181
Runa Sasaki (JPN)	A	74	~~78~~	~~79~~	74	7	96	101	105	105	4	179
Tiki Mohini Mallik (IND)	A	70	73	75	75	6	90	95	98	98	8	173
Vicha Kun Thea (CAM)	A	40	~~43~~	~~44~~	40	8	50	53	55	55	10	95
Zibagül Söýmüşowa (TKM)	A	~~78~~	~~78~~	~~82~~	—	—	100	~~104~~	~~106~~	100	7	NM
Shammi Sultana (BAN)	A	~~60~~	~~60~~	~~60~~	—	—	68	71	~~74~~	74	9	NM
Nurul Syasya Khairina (MAS)	A	~~75~~	~~75~~	~~75~~	—	—	—	—	—	—	—	NM

==== 69 kg ====
29 October

Athlete	Group	Snatch (kg)					Clean & Jerk (kg)					Total
Athlete	Group	1	2	3	Result	Rank	1	2	3	Result	Rank	Total
Ri Sae-byol (PRK)	A	~~93~~	95	98	98	1st place, gold medalist(s)	124	127	~~130~~	127	1st place, gold medalist(s)	225
Shakhnoza Khaydarova (UZB)	A	93	~~96~~	97	97	2nd place, silver medalist(s)	~~120~~	120	~~126~~	120	4	217
Zahra Hosseini (IRI)	A	88	92	~~96~~	92	3rd place, bronze medalist(s)	115	121	~~126~~	121	3rd place, bronze medalist(s)	213
Meng Sitong (CHN)	A	87	~~91~~	~~94~~	87	4	115	120	125	125	2nd place, silver medalist(s)	212
Maýagözel Hürmenowa (TKM)	A	~~76~~	76	~~79~~	76	5	95	98	100	100	6	176
Votcha Lintang Santira (INA)	A	75	~~79~~	~~79~~	75	6	95	99	101	101	5	176
Margarita Yermakova (KAZ)	A	~~70~~	71	74	74	7	86	91	~~96~~	91	8	165
Yu Pei-ying (TPE)	A	~~70~~	70	~~73~~	70	8	~~95~~	95	~~99~~	95	7	165
Siet Reksa (CAM)	A	43	46	~~50~~	46	9	~~63~~	~~63~~	63	63	9	109

==== 77 kg ====
30 October

Athlete	Group	Snatch (kg)					Clean & Jerk (kg)					Total
Athlete	Group	1	2	3	Result	Rank	1	2	3	Result	Rank	Total
Dilnura Kholdorova (UZB)	A	89	93	95	95	1st place, gold medalist(s)	112	115	118	118	1st place, gold medalist(s)	213
Nasim Ghasemi (IRI)	A	89	92	94	94	2nd place, silver medalist(s)	111	114	~~118~~	114	2nd place, silver medalist(s)	208
Alyamaulida Kartika Pertiwi (INA)	A	~~90~~	90	~~94~~	90	3rd place, bronze medalist(s)	110	113	~~116~~	113	3rd place, bronze medalist(s)	203
Asal Kerimbaýewa (TKM)	A	~~88~~	88	~~91~~	88	4	107	~~111~~	~~111~~	107	4	195
Lian Pei-yu (TPE)	A	80	84	88	88	5	100	105	~~111~~	105	5	193
Grishma Yatin Thorat (IND)	A	72	77	80	80	6	95	100	~~103~~	100	6	180
Samadhi Pabasara (SRI)	A	65	70	71	71	7	85	~~91~~	~~95~~	85	7	156

==== +77 kg ====
30 October

Athlete	Group	Snatch (kg)					Clean & Jerk (kg)					Total
Athlete	Group	1	2	3	Result	Rank	1	2	3	Result	Rank	Total
Hu Wenxun (CHN)	A	110	~~115~~	115	115	1st place, gold medalist(s)	145	152	—	152	1st place, gold medalist(s)	267
Kim Che-ryang (KOR)	A	100	104	106	106	2nd place, silver medalist(s)	141	~~146~~	151	151	2nd place, silver medalist(s)	257
Mahsa Beheshti (IRI)	A	97	102	105	105	3rd place, bronze medalist(s)	128	133	136	136	4	241
Mohinur Esonboeva (UZB)	A	~~101~~	101	103	103	4	129	~~134~~	137	137	3rd place, bronze medalist(s)	240
Su Sheng-ci (TPE)	A	90	94	97	97	5	116	~~123~~	123	123	5	220
