= Teqball at the 2025 Asian Youth Games =

2025 Asian Youth Games competition

- Venue: Exhibition World Bahrain
- Dates: 20–23 October 2025

Teqball at the 2025 Asian Youth Games was held in Sakhir, Bahrain from 20 to 23 October 2025 at the Exhibition World Bahrain. This marked the first time a sport was being played in this competition.

The competition was played as the best-of-three sets and a set was won by the first side to reach 12 points. The final decisive set must be won by at least a two-point margin.

== Medalists ==
Event	Gold	Silver	Bronze
Boys' singles	Thammanun Chokkittikul; Thailand	Nooruldeen Hayder; Iraq	Naser Al-Saqer; Kuwait
Boys' doubles	Iraq; Abulfadhel Jalil; Nooruldeen Hayder	Thailand; Katanyu Potong; Ketsada Mahasaksit	Malaysia; Amirul Danish; Rahmat Tiarareza
Girls' singles	Noppasorn Jaikum; Thailand	Jiang Xinyan; China	Zahrotus Syifa; Indonesia
Girls' doubles	Thailand; Phatrawan Simawong; Chiratchayaphon Kenkhunthod	China; Jiang Xinyan; Chen Jiayi	Philippines; Crystal Cariño; Nicole Tabucol
Mixed doubles	Thailand; Anantachok Ngunkhunthod; Chiratchayaphon Kenkhunthod	Iraq; Abulfadhel Jalil; Narjis Sadeq	Malaysia; Amirul Danish; Putri Zarra Arissa

== Medal table ==
Rank	Nation	Gold	Silver	Bronze	Total
1	Thailand (THA)	4	1	0	5
2	Iraq (IRQ)	1	2	0	3
3	China (CHN)	0	2	0	2
4	Malaysia (MAS)	0	0	2	2
5	Indonesia (INA)	0	0	1	1
5	Kuwait (KUW)	0	0	1	1
5	Philippines (PHI)	0	0	1	1
Totals (7 entries)		5	5	5	15

== Results ==
=== Boys' singles ===
==== Group play ====
20 October

Group A
Pos	Athlete	Pld	W	L	Pts	CHN	MAS	IND
1	Mao Zheming (CHN)	2	2	0	4	—	2–1	2–1
2	Rahmat Tiarareza (MAS)	2	1	1	3	−10, 6, 8	—	2–1
3	Atharva Sakpal (IND)	2	0	2	2	5, −11, 7	−11, 8, 8	—

Group B
Pos	Athlete	Pld	W	L	Pts	IRQ	THA	JPN
1	Nooruldeen Hayder (IRQ)	2	2	0	4	—	2–0	2–0
2	Thammanun Chokkittikul (THA)	2	1	1	3	8, 11	—	2–0
3	Kai Ikeda (JPN)	2	0	2	2	4, 3	5, 10	—

Group C
Pos	Athlete	Pld	W	L	Pts	PAK	KUW	CAM	LBN
1	Muhammad Munim Siddiqui (PAK)	3	3	0	6	—	2–1	2–1	2–0
2	Naser Al-Saqer (KUW)	3	2	1	5	11, −8, 9	—	2–0	2–0
3	Meun Rothana (CAM)	3	1	2	4	−10, 7, 11	5, 4	—	2–0
4	Radi Chebbo (LBN)	3	0	3	3	8, 6	5, 8	7, 6	—

Group D
Pos	Athlete	Pld	W	L	Pts	BRN	PHI	INA	MGL
1	Ahmed Sharif (BRN)	3	3	0	6	—	2–0	2–0	2–0
2	Angelo Paracale (PHI)	3	2	1	5	8, 8	—	2–0	2–0
3	Muhammad Dazzu (INA)	3	1	2	4	10, 7	11, 6	—	2–0
4	Ganzorigiin Chingüün (MGL)	3	0	3	3	5, 4	5, 6	7, 8	—

Source: FITEQ

==== Knockout round ====
Quarterfinals; 20 October
Mao Zheming (CHN)	10	8
Thammanun Chokkittikul (THA)	12	12
Naser Al-Saqer (KUW)	12	12
Ahmed Sharif (BRN)	4	7
Muhammad Munim Siddiqui (PAK)	4	10
Rahmat Tiarareza (MAS)	12	12
Angelo Paracale (PHI)	0	5
Nooruldeen Hayder (IRQ)	12	12

Semifinals; 22 October
Thammanun Chokkittikul (THA)	12	12
Naser Al-Saqer (KUW)	1	2
Rahmat Tiarareza (MAS)	6	8
Nooruldeen Hayder (IRQ)	12	12

Gold medal match 23 October
Thammanun Chokkittikul (THA)	12	12
Nooruldeen Hayder (IRQ)	11	4
Bronze medal match
Naser Al-Saqer (KUW)	12	12
Rahmat Tiarareza (MAS)	8	10

=== Boys' doubles ===
==== Group play ====
21 October

Group A
Pos	Team	Pld	W	L	Pts	MAS	CHN	KUW	INA	LBN
1	Amirul Danish (MAS) Rahmat Tiarareza (MAS)	4	4	0	8	—	2–1	2–1	2–0	2–0
2	Zhang Zhiang (CHN) Li Junlin (CHN)	4	3	1	7	8, −8, 7	—	2–0	2–1	2–0
3	Abdallah Al-Wuhaib (KUW) Abdulrahman Al-Kandari (KUW)	4	2	2	6	2, −5, 6	7, 4	—	2–0	2–0
4	Nabil Fauzan Kamil (INA) Mochammad Zakky Nugraha (INA)	4	1	3	5	6, 7	−11, 8, 3	10, 6	—	2–0
5	Radi Chebbo (LBN) Anthony El-Sabbagh (LBN)	4	0	4	4	2, 7	9, 5	6, 2	7, 6	—

Group B
Pos	Team	Pld	W	L	Pts	THA	IRQ	CAM	IND	PHI	BRN
1	Katanyu Potong (THA) Ketsada Mahasaksit (THA)	5	5	0	10	—	2–1	2–0	2–0	2–0	2–0
2	Abulfadhel Jalil (IRQ) Nooruldeen Hayder (IRQ)	5	4	1	9	7, −11, 18	—	2–0	2–0	2–0	2–0
3	Meun Rothana (CAM) Cheat Kheamravisoth (CAM)	5	3	2	8	4, 2	4, 4	—	2–0	2–1	2–0
4	Akash Singha (IND) Rajib Ahmed Barbhuiya (IND)	5	2	3	7	3, 3	5, 4	2, 11	—	2–1	2–0
5	Nomar Andres (PHI) Fits Gerald Erece (PHI)	5	1	4	6	4, 4	6, 5	6, −9, 4	5, −11, 12	—	2–0
6	Hussain Isa (BRN) Ali Hasan (BRN)	5	0	5	5	3, 3	5, 4	2, 3	6, 0	3, 6	—

Source: FITEQ

==== Knockout round ====
Quarterfinals; 21 October
Katanyu Potong (THA); Ketsada Mahasaksit (THA)	12	12
Nabil Fauzan Kamil (INA); Mochammad Zakky Nugraha (INA)	5	1
Zhang Zhiang (CHN); Li Junlin (CHN)	12	9	12
Meun Rothana (CAM); Cheat Kheamravisoth (CAM)	10	12	7
Abulfadhel Jalil (IRQ); Nooruldeen Hayder (IRQ)	12	12
Abdallah Al-Wuhaib (KUW); Abdulrahman Al-Kandari (KUW)	1	5
Akash Singha (IND); Rajib Ahmed Barbhuiya (IND)	12	1	7
Amirul Danish (MAS); Rahmat Tiarareza (MAS)	8	12	12

Semifinals; 22 October
Katanyu Potong (THA); Ketsada Mahasaksit (THA)	12	12
Zhang Zhiang (CHN); Li Junlin (CHN)	4	4
Abulfadhel Jalil (IRQ); Nooruldeen Hayder (IRQ)	12	12
Amirul Danish (MAS); Rahmat Tiarareza (MAS)	3	10

Gold medal match 23 October
Katanyu Potong (THA); Ketsada Mahasaksit (THA)	7	4
Abulfadhel Jalil (IRQ); Nooruldeen Hayder (IRQ)	12	12
Bronze medal match
Zhang Zhiang (CHN); Li Junlin (CHN)	11	7
Amirul Danish (MAS); Rahmat Tiarareza (MAS)	12	12

=== Girls' singles ===
==== Group play ====
20 October

Group A
Pos	Athlete	Pld	W	L	Pts	BRN	LBN	PHI	IND
1	Rawan Abdulaziz (BRN)	3	3	0	6	—	2–0	2–0	2–0
2	Lea Khachffe (LBN)	3	2	1	5	5, 10	—	2–0	2–0
3	Joellene Cruz (PHI)	3	1	2	4	6, 9	8, 4	—	2–0
4	Rajashree Gogoi (IND)	3	0	3	3	9, 5	4, 7	9, 11	—

Group B
Pos	Athlete	Pld	W	L	Pts	THA	CHN	INA	IRQ	MAS
1	Noppasorn Jaikum (THA)	4	4	0	8	—	2–0	2–0	2–0	2–0
2	Jiang Xinyan (CHN)	4	3	1	7	5, 1	—	2–1	2–0	2–0
3	Zahrotus Syifa (INA)	4	2	2	6	1, 9	−6, 7, 3	—	2–1	2–1
4	Narjis Sadeq (IRQ)	4	1	3	5	6, 3	9, 10	−11, 6, 8	—	2–0
5	Putri Zarra Arissa (MAS)	4	0	4	4	1, 4	4, 7	4, −11, 7	8, 10	—

Source: FITEQ

==== Knockout round ====
Quarterfinals; 20 October
Rawan Abdulaziz (BRN)	4	3
Narjis Sadeq (IRQ)	12	12
Jiang Xinyan (CHN)	12	12
Joellene Cruz (PHI)	3	4
Zahrotus Syifa (INA)	12	12
Lea Khachffe (LBN)	7	6
Rajashree Gogoi (IND)	1	1
Noppasorn Jaikum (THA)	12	12

Semifinals; 22 October
Narjis Sadeq (IRQ)	6	6
Jiang Xinyan (CHN)	12	12
Zahrotus Syifa (INA)	8	6
Noppasorn Jaikum (THA)	12	12

Gold medal match 23 October
Jiang Xinyan (CHN)	9	6
Noppasorn Jaikum (THA)	12	12
Bronze medal match
Narjis Sadeq (IRQ)	4	4
Zahrotus Syifa (INA)	12	12

=== Girls' doubles ===
==== Group play ====
21 October

Group A
Pos	Team	Pld	W	L	Pts	BRN	PHI	IND
1	Rawan Abdulaziz (BRN) Fatima Al-Banna (BRN)	2	2	0	4	—	2–0	2–1
2	Crystal Cariño (PHI) Nicole Tabucol (PHI)	2	1	1	3	10, 10	—	2–1
3	Rakshana Mageshkumar (IND) Maha Sankar (IND)	2	0	2	2	9, −8, 10	−9, 11, 11	—

Group B
Pos	Team	Pld	W	L	Pts	THA	CHN	INA
1	Phatrawan Simawong (THA) Chiratchayaphon Kenkhunthod (THA)	2	2	0	4	—	2–0	2–0
2	Jiang Xinyan (CHN) Chen Jiayi (CHN)	2	1	1	3	10, 2	—	2–0
3	Nadia Syabilla (INA) Raisya Zahratunnisa (INA)	2	0	2	2	2, 1	5, 8	—

Source: FITEQ

==== Knockout round ====
Semifinals; 22 October
Rawan Abdulaziz (BRN); Fatima Al-Banna (BRN)	4	5
Jiang Xinyan (CHN); Chen Jiayi (CHN)	12	12
Phatrawan Simawong (THA); Chiratchayaphon Kenkhunthod (THA)	12	12
Crystal Cariño (PHI); Nicole Tabucol (PHI)	3	1

Gold medal match 23 October
Jiang Xinyan (CHN); Chen Jiayi (CHN)	3	7
Phatrawan Simawong (THA); Chiratchayaphon Kenkhunthod (THA)	12	12
Bronze medal match
Rawan Abdulaziz (BRN); Fatima Al-Banna (BRN)	12	10	12
Crystal Cariño (PHI); Nicole Tabucol (PHI)	10	12	14

=== Mixed doubles ===
==== Group play ====
20 October

Group A
Pos	Team	Pld	W	L	Pts	THA	CHN	LBN	IND
1	Anantachok Ngunkhunthod (THA) Chiratchayaphon Kenkhunthod (THA)	3	3	0	6	—	2–0	2–0	2–0
2	Luan Shaoxuan (CHN) Wu Chang (CHN)	3	2	1	5	5, 5	—	2–0	2–0
3	Anthony El-Sabbagh (LBN) Lea Khachffe (LBN)	3	1	2	4	1, 0	7, 6	—	2–1
4	Adhish Anand Narayanan (IND) Anushka Malleshappa (IND)	3	0	3	3	2, 5	7, 3	−10, 8, 7	—

Group B
Pos	Team	Pld	W	L	Pts	IRQ	MAS	PHI	BRN
1	Abulfadhel Jalil (IRQ) Narjis Sadeq (IRQ)	3	3	0	6	—	2–0	2–0	2–0
2	Amirul Danish (MAS) Putri Zarra Arissa (MAS)	3	2	1	5	7, 2	—	2–0	2–0
3	Nomar Andres (PHI) Nicole Tabucol (PHI)	3	1	2	4	5, 5	7, 11	—	2–1
4	Ahmed Sharif (BRN) Fatima Al-Banna (BRN)	3	0	3	3	2, 4	2, 8	−10, 5, 8	—

Source: FITEQ

==== Knockout round ====
Quarterfinals; 20 October
Ahmed Sharif (BRN); Fatima Al-Banna (BRN)	5	8
Anantachok Ngunkhunthod (THA); Chiratchayaphon Kenkhunthod (THA)	12	12
Luan Shaoxuan (CHN); Wu Chang (CHN)	12	12
Nomar Andres (PHI); Nicole Tabucol (PHI)	8	5
Anthony El-Sabbagh (LBN); Lea Khachffe (LBN)	11	7
Amirul Danish (MAS); Putri Zarra Arissa (MAS)	12	12
Abulfadhel Jalil (IRQ); Narjis Sadeq (IRQ)	12	12
Adhish Anand Narayanan (IND); Anushka Malleshappa (IND)	4	3

Semifinals; 22 October
Anantachok Ngunkhunthod (THA); Chiratchayaphon Kenkhunthod (THA)	12	12
Luan Shaoxuan (CHN); Wu Chang (CHN)	2	3
Amirul Danish (MAS); Putri Zarra Arissa (MAS)	3	9
Abulfadhel Jalil (IRQ); Narjis Sadeq (IRQ)	12	12

Gold medal match 23 October
Anantachok Ngunkhunthod (THA); Chiratchayaphon Kenkhunthod (THA)	12	12
Abulfadhel Jalil (IRQ); Narjis Sadeq (IRQ)	4	6
Bronze medal match
Luan Shaoxuan (CHN); Wu Chang (CHN)	12	10	4
Amirul Danish (MAS); Putri Zarra Arissa (MAS)	8	12	12
