= 2024 FIFAe World Cup featuring Rocket League =

International esports tournament

2024 World Cup Resevers
- 2024

Tournament information
- Game: Rocket League (Esports)
- Location: Riyadh, Wales
- Date: 5-8 December 2024
- Administrator: FIFA
- Venue: SEF Arena, Boulevard City
- Teams: 16
- Total Prize: $250,000

Final positions
- Champions: Saudi Arabia
- Runner-up: France
- 3rd place: Brazil; Morocco

Tournament statistics
- Matches played: 147
- Goals scored: 1143 (7.78 per match)
- MVP: Mohammed Khalid Alotaibi - Trk511 (Saudi Arabia)

The 2024 FIFAe World Cup featuring Rocket League, part of the 18th FIFAe World Cup, was a Rocket League esports tournament organized by FIFA. It was the first edition of the FIFAe World Cup played on Rocket League, with the FIFAe World Cup also holding eFootball (Mobile and Console) and Football Manager tournaments. The tournament was held in Riyadh, Saudi Arabia, from 5 to 8 December 2024. As the host country, Saudi Arabia won the tournament, defeating France 4-1 in the final.

== Background ==
Between 2004 and 2023, the FIFAe World Cup (previously the FIFA Interactive World Cup and FIFA eWorld Cup) was held on the then-latest edition of the FIFA series, which was developed by EA Sports and featured the FIFA licence. However, in 2022 FIFA announced that they would no longer renew their licence with EA, marking FIFA 23 as the last game in the thirty-year long series and the 2023 FIFAe World Cup the last to feature a FIFA game. EA would develop their own competitive circuit for their football series known as EA Sports FC (using the partnered tournaments they already developed with existing football leagues), which was known as EA Sports FC Pro, or FC Pro for short.

After EA and FIFA parted ways, it was unclear if the FIFAe World Cup would continue with another football video game. On 23 June 2024, FIFA announced that the series would continue, initially with a Rocket League tournament, with Football Manager also added on 26 June. eFootball (long seen as a rival to FIFA as Pro Evolution Soccer) would be added on 10 October. Both the Rocket League and eFootball (Mobile and Console) tournaments were played together, as the Football Manager tournament was held separately in late August and early September of that year. Riyadh, Saudi Arabia was confirmed as the host on 25 November 2024.

== Format ==
Nations will send a team of three plus one alternate for the tournament. The participating nations may opt for a qualification process or internally select the team that will represent their country. The teams are split into two groups of eight and compete in single round robin matchups. The top four teams per group advance to a knockout stage, where the world champions will be crowned.

== Teams ==
16 nations were selected by FIFA to compete in the tournament based on playerbase and previous performances; initially this was announced to be based on the number of representatives from each country in previous Rocket League Majors. Each nation will be responsible for organizing their own qualifying tournaments for the competition, otherwise they can invite their own set of players. The first three nations were announced on 9 August, with the rest being announced on 11, 13, 15 and 17 August.

=== Participating nations ===
Team	Appearance	Previous best performance
Argentina	1st	Debut
Australia	1st	Debut
Belgium	1st	Debut
Brazil	1st	Debut
Chile	1st	Debut
England	1st	Debut
Germany	1st	Debut
France	1st	Debut
Morocco	1st	Debut
Netherlands	1st	Debut
Portugal	1st	Debut
Saudi Arabia	1st	Debut
Spain	1st	Debut
South Africa	1st	Debut
Turkey	1st	Debut
United States	1st	Debut

=== Team list ===
Nation	Abbr.	Team Name	Head coach	Main Team			Substitute
Nation	Abbr.	Team Name	Head coach	Player 1	Player 2	Player 3	Substitute
Argentina	ARG	Messirve	pekitas (Pablo Agustín Novelli)	misery (Martin Santiago Gil)	UmBroken (Lucas Fierro)	ajg. (Lautaro Gusinsky)	Same as Coach
Australia	AUS	N/A	N/A	Fever (Lachlan Aitchison)	gus (Angus Hall)	Torsos (Daniel Parsons)	Rez
Belgium	BEL	can we play pls	LDC- (Liam De Cuypere)	Atow. (Tristan Soyez)	Compact (Zeno Sterkens)	AztraL (Maëllo Ernst)	Same as Coach
Brazil	BRA	FURIA	STL (Mateus Santos)	yANXNZ (Yan Xisto Nolasco)	Lostt (Gabriel Buzon)	DRUFINHO (Arthur Langsch Miguel)	Same as Coach
Chile	CHI	ELITE	groval (Alejandro Valdenegro)	Reysbull (Victor Duran Parra)	Davitrox (David Gárate)	pan (Sebastián Andrés Parra Castillo)	Same as Coach
England	ENG	N/A	n0ah (Noah Hinder)	archie (Archie Pickthall)	Joyo (Joe Young)	rise. (Finlay Ferguson)	Toxiic (Ben Salmon)
Germany	GER	TRRC	Catalysm (Leonardo Christ Ramos)	Tox (Damian Schäfer)	Rezears (David Wünsch)	Rizex45 (Riccardo Mazzota)	Same as Coach
France	FRA	N/A	Ferra (Victor Francal)	Vatira (Axel Touret)	M0nkey M00n (Evan Rogez)	Zen (Alexis Bernier)	Same as Coach
Morocco	MAR	N/A	Satthew (Matthew Ackermann)	dralii (Samy Hajji)	itachi (Amine Benayachi)	nass (Nassim Bali)	Yeca2k00
Netherlands	NED	Team oaly.	ViolentPanda (Jos van Meurs)	Joreuz (Joris Robben)	MikeBoy (Mike Verkuijlen)	oaly. (Ole van Doorn)	Oscillon (Maarten van Zee)
Portugal	POR	Str1ve eSports	ordep04	rafa. (Ivo Rafael Pereira)	beyond (Gonçalo Cunha)	vadyy (Valdemar Silva)	Same as Coach
Saudi Arabia	KSA	Team Falcons	d7oom-24 (Abdulrahman Saad)	Kiileerrz (Yazid Bakhashwin)	Rw9 (Saleh Bakhashwin)	trk511 (Mohammed Alotaibi)	Same as Coach
South Africa	RSA	Precious	CpZebra (Nicholas Fourie)	Sweaty (Joshua Kleynhans)	2Die4 (David Morgenrood)	Snowyy (Gareth Spiers)	Same as Coach
Spain	SPA	Genios de la Redonda	Braan. (Brandon Porto Fernández)	AtomiK (Sergio Pérez Cortés)	crr (Cristian Fernandez)	stizzy (Gaspar Rosalen Andres)	Same as Coach
Turkey	TUR	N/A	N/A	Jzmmm	Lorely (Arda Teker)	zgocBrayt (Mustafa Can Sarı)	Andeque
United States	USA	Gen.G Mobil 1 Racing	torment (Kyle Stormer)	Retals (Slater Thomas)	MaJicBear (Christopher Acevedo)	CHEESE. (Carlos Aguado)	RawGreg (Gregory Alex)

== Group stage ==
=== Group A ===
Pos	Team	Pld	W	D	L	GF	GA	GD	Pts	Qualification
1	Saudi Arabia	14	7	7	0	21	7	+14	28	Knockout stage
2	Netherlands	14	7	5	2	19	9	+10	26	Knockout stage
3	Belgium	14	6	7	1	19	9	+10	25	Knockout stage
4	Spain	14	5	6	3	16	12	+4	21	Knockout stage
5	England	14	4	7	3	15	13	+2	19	
6	Germany	14	4	6	4	14	14	0	18	
7	Australia	14	2	2	10	6	22	−16	8	
8	South Africa	14	0	2	12	2	26	−24	2	

Source: FIFAe

=== Group B ===
Pos	Team	Pld	W	D	L	GF	GA	GD	Pts	Qualification
1	France	14	11	3	0	25	3	+22	36	Knockout stage
2	Brazil	14	9	4	1	22	6	+16	31	Knockout stage
3	Morocco	14	8	5	1	21	7	+14	29	Knockout stage
4	Chile	14	7	2	5	16	12	+4	23	Knockout stage
5	United States	14	6	2	6	14	14	0	20	
6	Argentina	14	2	3	9	7	21	−14	9	
7	Portugal	14	1	2	11	4	24	−20	5	
8	Turkey	14	0	3	11	3	25	−22	3	

Source: FIFAe

== Knockout stage ==
=== Bracket ===
Quarter-finals
8 December
Saudi Arabia	4
Chile	0
8 December
Brazil	4
Belgium	2
8 December
France	4
Spain	0
8 December
Netherlands	1
Morocco	4

Semi-finals
9 December
Saudi Arabia	4
Brazil	0
9 December
France	4
Morocco	3

Final
9 December
Saudi Arabia	4
France	1

== See also ==
- 2024 FIFAe World Cup of Football Manager
