= EFootball.Open =

Showpiece event at the end of the competitive PES Season for 1v1 competition

eFootball World Championships
Tournament information
- Game: eFootball
- Location: Tokyo, Japan
- Dates: 25-07-2026–26-07-2026
- Month played: July
- Established: 2002
- Number of tournaments: 25
- Administrator: Konami
- Format: Round-robin (group stage); Single-elimination (bracket stage)
- Host: Konami
- Venue: Konami Studio Ginza
- Website: Official Website

Current champion
- (Brazil) FUTEASY_10 (console) (Brazil) Renato (Mobile)

eFootball World Championships (formerly known as the PES League and the eFootball League) is the official global eFootball championship organized by Konami, the publisher of the series. Established in France in the early 2000s, the competition later expanded internationally and has been directly managed by Konami since 2010. Historically, it served as the official 1v1 esports world championship for the Pro Evolution Soccer (PES) franchise.

In 2020, the competition structure was reorganized as part of the newly established eFootball Esports League. The system was divided into two components:

- eFootball.Open (formerly PES League) – an open tournament for amateur players.
- eFootball.Pro – a league for contracted professional players representing major European football clubs.

Since 2023, eFootball.Pro has been discontinued. The 2023 eFootball.Open World Finals became the first unified global finals since 2019, open to both amateur and professional players. The event was held for the first time in Tokyo, Japan, at Konami’s renovated headquarters and its dedicated esports arena.

== 3v3 competition ==
The most recent PES 3v3 World Champions are the Brazilian team eLiga Sul Stars, who won the 3v3 PES League Finals on 29 June 2019, claiming a top prize of US$75,000 divided among the players.

== All editions ==
=== Individual tournament (1v1) - eFootball.Open ===
- 2002–2009 (PES European Finals)
- 2010–2019 (PES World Finals)
- 2018–2023 (eFootball.Pro League)
- 2020–2022 (eFootball.Open Online Editions)
- 2023–present (eFootball.Open World Finals)

European PES Championship (2002 - 2009)
Edition	Host city and country	Champion (gold)	Final result	Runner-up (silver)	Third place(s) (bronze)	Open to	Ref	Vid
2002	Grindelwald, Switzerland	(France) Noam 'No' El Ouali	Unknown	(Italy) unknown	(Germany) Marcel Walke	Europe		
2003	Grindelwald, Switzerland	(Germany) Marcel Walke	2-0	(France) Johnny Desmares	(Switzerland) Marius Vogelsanger	Europe		
2004	Nice, France	(France) "Sebou"	2-1	(United Kingdom) Osman "Oz" Idris	(Italy) "Valentino"	Europe		
2005	Sardinia, Italy	(Poland) Gregorz "Esiek" Kuznik	2-1	(Belgium) Yasin "Jinxy" Koroglu	(Switzerland) Daniele "dibe" Bernardi	Europe		
2006	(Republic of Ireland) Dublin, Ireland	(Germany) Mike "El Matador" Linden	4-2	(United Kingdom) Robert "RobMclean" Mclean	(Portugal) Fabio "Modjo" Ribiero	Europe		
2007	Sevilla, Spain	(United Kingdom) Robert "RobMclean" Mclean	6-1	(United Kingdom) Mark "Marko9Gardinic" Gardiner	(Poland) Sebastian "Seb" Plocienniczaka	Europe		
2007	Sevilla, Spain	(United Kingdom) Robert "RobMclean" Mclean	6-1	(United Kingdom) Mark "Marko9Gardinic" Gardiner	(Germany) Matthias "GoooL" Winkler	Europe		
2008	Rome, Italy	(Germany) Sven 'S-Butcher' Wehmeier	2-1	(Germany) Dennis "wiDe" Winkler	(Italy) Andrea "The Legend" Parisi	Europe		
2009	Nice, France	(Belgium) Yasin "Jinxy" Koroglu	2-1	(Spain) Luis "Superdinho" Cintas Sola	(Germany) Dennis "wiDe" Winkler	Europe		
PES League World Finals (2010 - 2019)
2010	Mallorca, Spain	(Portugal) Christopher "Christopher" Morais	2-1	(Italy) Ettore "Ettorito97" Giannuzzi	(Germany) Sven 'S-Butcher' Wehmeier	Global		
2010	Mallorca, Spain	(Portugal) Christopher "Christopher" Morais	2-1	(Italy) Ettore "Ettorito97" Giannuzzi	(Greece) George 'The Greek' Tsirita	Global		
2011	Cologne, Germany	(Italy) Ettore "Ettorito97" Giannuzzi	4-1	(Japan) Subaru "Subaru" Sanago	(Portugal) Christopher "Christopher" Morais	Global		
2012	Madrid, Spain	(Spain) Pau "PaUU_24" Lara	6-5	(Israel) Ron "Strikel" Strikel	(Germany) Mike "El Matador" Linden	Global		
2012	Madrid, Spain	(Spain) Pau "PaUU_24" Lara	6-5	(Israel) Ron "Strikel" Strikel	(Portugal) José "Puto Zeca" Silva	Global		
2013	Dubai, United Arab Emirates	(Germany) Patrick "Phayton" Maier	4-1	(Brazil) Allison "Allison Black" Pereira	(Greece) Lazaros 'IptamenosOllandos' Kopanidis	Global		
2014	Manchester, England	(Greece) Anastasios "Apolytosarxon" Pappis	3-2	(Italy) Ettore "VietKong90321" Giannuzzi	(United Kingdom) Dex "Ambidextrous" Kord	Global		
2015	Berlin, Germany	(France) Walid "usmakabyle" Teban	3-2	(Austria) Matthias "Lutti-1" Luttenberger	(Israel) Ron "Strikel" Strikel	Global		
2016	Milan, Italy	(France) Walid "usmakabyle" Teban	4-3	(Brazil) Guilherme "GuiFera15" Fonseca	(Panama) Gerardo "Sr Conse" Colthirst	Global		
2017	Cardiff, Wales	(Brazil) Guilherme "GuiFera" Fonseca	2-1	(Italy) Ettore "Ettorito97" Giannuzzi	(Peru) Jhonatan "Jhona_KRA" Salazar	Global		
2018	Barcelona, Spain	(Italy) Ettore "Ettorito97" Giannuzzi	3-0	(Spain) Alex "AlexAlguacil_8" Alguacil	(Brazil) Felipe "Fmestre12_PW" Mestre	Global		
2018	Barcelona, Spain	(Italy) Ettore "Ettorito97" Giannuzzi	3-0	(Spain) Alex "AlexAlguacil_8" Alguacil	(France) Jeremy "TioMiit_PW" Bruniaux	Global		
2019	London, England	(France) Walid "usmakabyle" Teban	4-3	(Italy) Ettore "Ettorito97" Giannuzzi	(Indonesia) Rizky "Zeus_Faidan" Faidan	Global		
2019	London, England	(France) Walid "usmakabyle" Teban	4-3	(Italy) Ettore "Ettorito97" Giannuzzi	(Portugal) Christopher "Christopher_PW" Morais	Global		
eFootball.Open World Finals (2020 - 2022)
2020 (PS4)	Online	(Japan) madakanachappy	1-0	(Indonesia) akbarpaudie	(Brazil) dannyelements	Global		
2020 (PS4)	Online	(Japan) madakanachappy	1-0	(Indonesia) akbarpaudie	(Brazil) MayconDouglas99	Global		
2020 (Xbox)	Online	(Brazil) ThePhenom3392	4-2	(Argentina) MelianTheKing	(Spain) PaUUU24	Global		
2020 (Xbox)	Online	(Brazil) ThePhenom3392	4-2	(Argentina) MelianTheKing	(Turkey) Mucahit21	Global		
2020 (Steam)	Online	(Germany) twitch_peazyyy	3-2	(Spain) Erkobra18	(Turkey) Ronaldo7	Global		
2020 (Steam)	Online	(Germany) twitch_peazyyy	3-2	(Spain) Erkobra18	(Malaysia) VNGLMHTS	Global		
2021 (PS4 EU)	Online	(Russia) komario14	1-0	(Israel) oreld123	bestia091119933 uae1-thebest	Europe	[39]	
2021 (PS4 US)	Online	(Argentina) MelianTheKing	5-3	(Argentina) Rey Molina	HenrykinhO LeoM1T0	Americas		
2021 (PS4 JP)	Online	(Japan) Ebipool	1-0	(Japan) Takaki	Leva Tess	Japan		
2021 (PS4 AS)	Online	(Indonesia) ZEUS_ELUL	5-3	(Indonesia) aji_battle208	ZEUS_ELGA ZEUS_Faidan	Asia		
2021 (Xbox)	Online	(Brazil) rafafiel10	2-0	(Brazil) Éder	NOVATO Saturn868643	Global		
2021 (Steam)	Online	(Brazil) NÓBREGA	1-1 (3-2 pen)	(Argentina) EV_SEBACAB96	Npk_02 momojuva	Global		
2022 (PS)	Online	(Brazil) Futefacil10	1-1 (2-1 pen)	(Jordan) SaifAlhacker55		Global		
2022 (XBOX)	Online	(Italy) xNaples17x	3-2	(Argentina) MelianTheKing		Global		
2022 (STEAM)	Online	(Japan) Verdi_Takaki_	4-0	(Peru) Ner-		Global		
2022 (MOBILE)	Online	(Indonesia) ig_asgard_azizi	4-2	(Brazil) Sergigame		Global		
eFootball Championship World Finals (2023- )
2023 (CONSOLE)	Tokyo, Japan	(Japan) Udi	3-2	(Poland) Milosz 'Zilo' Zietek	(Italy) Francesco 'Frankino' Sirianni (Indonesia) ZEUS_ELGACOR	Global		
2023 (MOBILE)	Tokyo, Japan	(Brazil) El_Mysterio	1-1 (6-5 pen)	(United States) LaCasAA	(Tunisia) Ztf_rami.mh (China) CNFC-Ronaldo	Global		
2024 (CONSOLE)	Tokyo, Japan	(Japan) Mayageka	3-1	(Japan) Ax	(Spain) The_Plama (Peru) NicanorER	Global		
2024 (MOBILE)	Tokyo, Japan	(Brazil) Renato	2-0	(Japan) Gu_038games	(Thailand) BRU_Jxkmt (Venezuela) YaorStrong	Global		
2025 (CONSOLE)	Tokyo, Japan	(Thailand) BRU_JEANSUI	1-1(3-2 pen)	(Spain) M_MESTRE	(Italy) ETTORITO (Japan) KATSUPEEYA	Global		
2025 (MOBILE)	Tokyo, Japan	(Brazil) JUNINHO EFOOTBALL	2-0	(China) DING	(Malaysia) HB_GEGE (Indonesia) ONIC DENNIS	Global		
2026 (CONSOLE)	Thailand	(Brazil) FUTEASY_10	4-3	(Italy) ETTORITO	(Algeria) usmakabyle (France) RealFabiano93	Global		
2026 (MOBILE)	Thailand	(Brazil) Renato	3-0	(Morocco) YASSINE ETTADLAOUI	(Indonesia) RRQ_RADIN (China) TJC_SWEAT20	Global		

=== Co-op World Finals (3v3) ===
Edition	Host city and country	Champions (gold)	Final result	Runners-up (silver)	Ref	Vid
2018	Barcelona, Spain	Broken Silence: (Italy) Ettore "Ettorito97" Giannuzzi (C); (Spain) Alex "AlexAlguacil_8" Alguacil; (Italy) Luca "Il Distruttore-44" Tubelli	2-0	Total Football: (Netherlands) Yan "Indojawa-FC" Sonneveld (C); (Netherlands) Yos "Indominator" Sonneveld; (Netherlands) Damien "Mr_Pro_Evo-D" Derkink		
2019	London, England	eLiga Sul Stars: (Brazil) Guilherme "GuiFera99" Fonseca (C); (Brazil) Wanderley "alemao_pesbr" Gomes; (Brazil) Ralph "Ralphmonteiroo" Monteiro	2-0	Wani: (Indonesia) Lucky "luckymaarif" Maarif; (Indonesia) Rizky "Zeus_Faidan" Faidan; (Indonesia) Rio "RIO_ds" Dwi Septiawan (C)		

== Most successful players ==
This table shows the most decorated players from the 1v1 Championship. Those who have won the Championship and placed top three in another are included.

Athlete	Country	Gold medal	Silver medal	Bronze medal	Total
Walid "usmakabyle" Teban	France	3	0	1	3
Ettore "Ettorito97" Giannuzzi	Italy	2	5	1	6
Yasin "Jinxy" Koroglu	Belgium	1	1	0	2
Robert "RobMclean" Mclean	United Kingdom	1	1	0	2
Guilherme "GuiFera" Fonseca	Brazil	1	1	0	2
Christopher "Christopher" Morais	Portugal	1	0	2	3
Marcel "dbc.Xside" Walke	Germany	1	0	1	2
Mike "El Matador" Linden	Germany	1	0	1	2
Sven "S-Butcher" Weihmeier	Germany	1	0	1	2

== eFootball.pro ==
eFootball.Pro is the esports project that aimed to professionalize the competitive Pro Evolution Soccer to the next level.

Consist of a professional league created by konami under a franchise format held in Barcelona, Spain by some of the best European football clubs as FC Barcelona, FC Bayern Munich, Manchester United F.C., Arsenal F.C, among others, who signed PES players, becoming professionals to represent them in this competition, initially competing with a 3v3 team competition structure offline and it was supposed to be the successor of the PESLeague series. Players who have recently done great results in the eFootball.Open competitions are more likely to be contracted by a professional club to represent them.

Official clubs participating in efootball.pro
edition	2018-2019	2019-2020	2020-2021	2022	2023
	6 clubs (2vs2)	10 clubs (3vs3)	10 clubs (3vs3)	8 clubs (1vs1)	8 clubs (1vs1)
List of teams	(Spain) FC BARCELONA; (Germany) SCHALKE 04; (France) AS MONACO; (Scotland) CELTIC FC; (France) FC NANTES; (Portugal) BOAVISTA	(Spain) FC BARCELONA; (England) MANCHESTER UNITED; (Germany) FC BAYERN MÜNCHEN; (Italy) JUVENTUS FC; (England) ARSENAL FC; (Scotland) CELTIC FC; (France) AS MONACO; (Germany) SCHALKE 04; (Portugal) BOAVISTA; (France) FC NANTES	(Spain) FC BARCELONA; (England) MANCHESTER UNITED; (Germany) FC BAYERN MÜNCHEN; (Italy) JUVENTUS FC; (England) ARSENAL FC; (Scotland) CELTIC FC; (France) AS MONACO; (Germany) SCHALKE 04; (Italy) AS ROMA; (Turkey) GALATASARAY SK	(Spain) FC BARCELONA; (England) MANCHESTER UNITED; (Germany) FC BAYERN MÜNCHEN; (England) ARSENAL FC; (Scotland) CELTIC FC; (France) AS MONACO; (Italy) AS ROMA; (Turkey) GALATASARAY SK	(Spain) FC BARCELONA; (England) MANCHESTER UNITED; (Germany) FC BAYERN MÜNCHEN; (England) ARSENAL FC; (France) AS MONACO; (Italy) AS ROMA; (Italy) AC MILAN; (Italy) FC INTER

=== All-time list of Winners ===
Edition	Champion (gold)	Result	Runner-up	Third place	Fourth place	Ref
2019	(France) AS Monaco	3 - 0	(Scotland) Celtic FC	(Spain) FC Barcelona (France) FC Nantes		
2020	(France) AS Monaco	xxx	(Germany) FC Bayern München	(Italy) Juventus de Turin		
2020 cup	(Germany) FC Bayern München	2 - 0	(Spain) FC Barcelona	(England) Manchester United (Italy) Juventus de Turin		
2021	(Italy) Juventus de Turin	3 - 1	(France) AS Monaco	(Germany) Schalke 04	(Italy) AS Roma	
2022	(France) AS Monaco	2 - 0	(Germany) FC Bayern München	(Scotland) Celtic FC	(Italy) AS Roma	
2023	(England) Manchester United	2 - 0	(Germany) FC Bayern München	(Spain) FC Barcelona (Italy) AC Milán		

==== eFootball.pro 2018 - 2019 ====
The first edition of this esports project is played with Pro Evolution Soccer 2019, and will feature the esports section of 6 participating clubs such as FC Barcelona, Schalke 04, AS Monaco, Celtic FC, FC Nantes, Boavista, in a Coop 2vs2 format, with a regular league + playoff structure.

On a championship day, two matches are played in each of the confrontations. Points are awarded for each match (3 points for a win, 1 point for a draw, 0 points for a loss). A club can therefore earn up to six points on a single matchday.

==== eFootball.pro 2019 - 2020 ====
For the eFootball.pro 2019–2020 season, the competition format was completely revamped with the inclusion of the Co-op 3vs3 format which provided more excitement between players and more spectacle between matches, also they added the elimination of the players' pass support level, looking for the purest essence of competition.

For the second edition, the number of teams was increased to 10 with the entry of Arsenal FC, Juventus FC, Manchester United FC or FC Bayern Munich, gaining media and public attention in more countries.

There was also a huge increase in the prize pool which was divided into regular league final position, playoffs, as well as individual matchday prizes of €10,000 for MVP and Best Goal.

In addition, at the end of the season, juicy monetary prizes were included for the MVP of the season, top scorer, top assist and best defender.

This step meant the entry into esports of several clubs in Europe who wanted to crown their triumph in efootball.pro 2020.

The 10 participating teams played in a regular league format, where the top 6 would advance to playoff play at the end of the season in a decisive weekend.

Everything changed in the middle of the season, when the arrival of the covid pandemic caused the pause and then the definitive cancellation of efootball.pro 2020 in its on-site format in Barcelona.

==== eFootball.pro CUP 2020 ====
The eFootball.Pro Cup is being organised exceptionally in 2020 to bridge the end of the season, following the discontinuation of the eFootball.Pro League. It will be played online. A total of €250,000 is awarded, plus the individual prizes of Best Goal of the Matchday, MVP of the day, during group stage and Playoffs.

The 10 teams are divided into two groups of five, from which the top two qualify for a knockout final phase, in a 3vs3 format.

The group stage is played in a single-elimination format. The semi-finals are played over two legs, while the final is played over a single match.

Dates : Group phase: 18 and 24 July. Final phase (semi-finals and final): 31 July.

==== eFootball.pro 2020 - 2021 ====
The eFootball.pro 2020 - 2021 was again organised in an online format, this time the whole season would take place in this way, with a 3vs3 regular league + playoffs format where the top 6 would advance to the finals.

For this edition AS Roma and Gatalasaray were added as new participating teams, providing new opportunities for players to enter the professional scene.

==== eFootball.pro 2022 ====
The eFootball.pro 2022 had a delay of several months, due to the uncertainty of whether to go back to the on-site format or stay online, in the end it went ahead with a short online format of a few months with finally 8 teams, after the absence of Juventus FC and Schalke 04.

The 8 participating teams were divided into 2 groups of 4, with the top 2 teams advancing to the final stage.

For this edition, the format was changed to a 1vs1 competition, where clubs would still have to recruit at least 3 players.

Each game would be played in 3 matches.

The finals would be played in Bo3 format (ET and PK) where the team that won 2 matches would advance to the next round.

==== eFootball.pro 2023 ====
The eFootball.pro 2023, the latest edition of the biggest competition in the history of competitive PES/eFootball scene was held again offline, in a 6-month format, almost returning to pre-Covid pandemic levels.

It would be made up of a total of 8 participating teams, with the entry of AC Milan and FC Inter.

All teams would have to hire 3 professional players for the season, with the option of substitutes.

The 2023 edition, as we said, would have an offline format in the Barcelona TV studio, with a 1vs1 regular league format (3 games against each rival) + Playoffs (bo3). *Team who wins 2 games advances.

In addition to the large pool of financial prizes, the best goal of the day and final phase, MVP of the Regular Phase and the Final Phase, would be added.
