= Rizky Faidan =

Indonesian esports player (born 2003)

binongboys
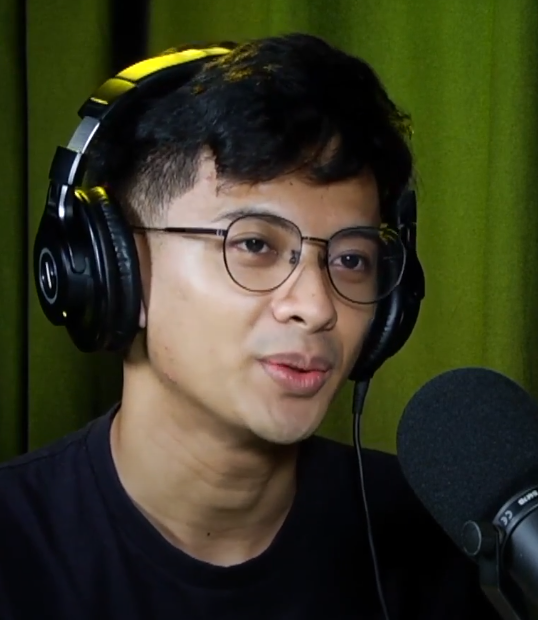
- Faidan in 2024

Personal information
- Name: Rizky Faidan
- Born: 2 March 2003 (age 23); Bandung, Indonesia
- Nationality: Indonesian

Current team
- Team: RRQ
- Game: eFootball

Career information
- Games: eFootball; FIFA Online 4
- Playing career: 2016–present

Team history
- –2024: Zeus Gaming (Note: Merged with ONIC Esports in 2019 as ONIC Zeus)
- 2019–2020: Buriram United Esports (loan)
- 2020–2021: PSS Sleman
- 2022: IOG Esports (Note: Bali United F.C. esports team.)
- 2023–2024: Persik Kediri
- 2025–present: RRQ

Career highlights and awards
- FIFAe World Cup ft. eFootball champion (Riyadh 2024); AFC eAsian Cup champion (Doha 2023); PES League Asia Regional champion (Tokyo 2019)

Rizky Faidan (born 2 March 2003), is an Indonesian professional eFootball player who currently plays for RRQ. He has represented several teams throughout his career, including Zeus Gaming, Buriram United Esports, PSS Sleman, IOG Esports and Persik Kediri.

Faidan began his esports career at a young age, playing in small local tournaments in his hometown Bandung. His rise to fame came when he became a PES SEACL finalist at the age of 13. Following his breakthrough, he competed at the PES League World Finals 2019 in London, where he gained international recognition for his performance.

== Early life ==
Faidan was born on 2 March 2003. Faidan started playing Pro Evolution Soccer on the PlayStation 2 at the age of nine, after being introduced to the game by his father and his older brother. At the age of 12, he joined Aliban Wani Adu, a local PES community in Bandung and began competing in local tournaments. Faidan is a graduate of SMA Negeri 16 Bandung.

== Career ==
=== 2016–2018: Career breakthrough ===
In 2016, at the age of 13, Faidan entered the national qualifiers for the SEACL in Bandung, where he won the tournament and earned the right to represent Indonesia in the regional finals. In the final event held in Hanoi, Vietnam, Faidan finished as the runner-up.

In 2018, at the age of 15, Faidan was selected to represent Indonesia at the 2018 Asian Games alongside Setia Widianto after winning the national qualifiers. However, the Indonesia Esports Association (IeSPA) announced that Faidan was ruled ineligible by the Asian Electronic Sports Federation (AeSF) due to the minimum age requirement of 16 years. He was eventually replaced by Elga Cahya, the runner-up of the national qualifiers.

=== 2019: Asia and World Finals ===
On 3 March 2019, Faidan won the SEAFinals in Bangkok, Thailand, after defeating Jesus from Vietnam in the final, earning ฿50.000 ($1.529) prize money. In the PES League National Finals Season 2: Asia, Faidan lost to Akbar Paudie 1–2 in the final. Despite the loss, Faidan still qualified for the PES League Asia Regional Finals.

On 21 April 2019, Faidan won the PES League Asia Regional Finals held in Tokyo, Japan, in the 1v1 category, remaining undefeated in the group stage. He defeated Akbar Paudie 7–4 in the quarterfinals, Verysutton from Hong Kong 1–0 in the semifinals, and Mayageka from Japan 3–2 in the final. In the co-op category, Faidan competed as part of Team Wani, alongside Rio Dwi Septiawan and Muchamad Lucky Ma’arif. The team won the championship after defeating Beginners, the Japanese representative, 3–2 in the final. As a result, they qualified as Asia’s representative for the PES League World Finals 2019.

The World Finals, held at the Emirates Stadium in London on 28–29 June 2019, saw Faidan begin his 1v1 campaign by winning two matches and drawing one in the group stage, which allowed him to qualify for the top eight. In the quarterfinals, he defeated HenrykinhO 4–2. In the semifinals, Faidan suffered a narrow 1–0 defeat against the defending and two-time world champion Ettorito97. In the co-op category, Faidan competed with Wani, representing Asia, and reached the final but lost 2–0 to eLiga Sul Stars, finishing as runners-up.

=== 2020–2022: Domestic success ===
In 2020, Faidan was loaned to Thai team Buriram United Esports. He won back-to-back Toyota E-League title in 2020 and 2021. In August 2020, Faidan joined PSS Sleman esports team to compete in the inaugural Indonesian Football eLeague. On 15 November 2020, Faidan became the inaugural IFeL champion, after beating Ferry Gumilang of Arema in the final, earning IDR 25.000.000 ($1.507) in prize money. In September 2021, Faidan alongside Ferry, represented West Java at the 2021 Pekan Olahraga Nasional held in Jayapura, where they won the gold medal. In December 2021, Faidan won the Indonesian eFootball Cup after defeating Elga Cahya of Borneo FC two straight games in the final.

In 2022, Faidan was called up to represent Indonesia’s FIFA Online 4 team at the 2021 SEA Games. After losing two matches in the group stage, Indonesia failed to advance to the knockout rounds. Although Faidan stated that he had no difficulties transitioning from PES to FIFA, he admitted that he needed to study the current meta used by professional players. In August 2022, Faidan joined Bali United's esports division, Island Of Gods esports, where he won his second IFeL title.

=== 2023–2024: Asian Cup and World Cup champions ===
In 2023, Faidan joined Persik Kediri esports team, where he won his second IeFC title alongside Philip Franc. In January 2024, Faidan alongside Akbar Paudie and Elga Cahya was called up to the Indonesia team for the 2024 AFC eAsian Cup in Doha, Qatar. After topping the group stage, Faidan and Indonesia advanced to the knockout rounds, achieving a 4–0 aggregate win against South Korea in the round of 16, a 12–1 aggregate victory in the quarter-finals against the United Arab Emirates, and a 3–1 aggregate win over Thailand in the semi-finals. In the final, Faidan played alongside Elga against Japan. The first game was closely contested, with Indonesia narrowly winning 3–2 on penalties after a 1–1 draw. The second game was even tighter, going into extra time. In the 100th minute, Indonesia scored the winning goal from a free-kick set-piece, becoming the inaugural champion of the competition.

In December 2024, Faidan, Elga, Akbar and Philip was called up to the Indonesia national team for the newly rebranded FIFAe World Cup held in Riyadh, Saudi Arabia. Indonesia finished second in the group with 19 points in 8 games, with Faidan contributing in victories over Poland, Malaysia, Netherlands, England and South Korea. In the quarter-finals, Faidan played all three games as Indonesia beat Morocco 2–1 in a best-of-3 series. Faidan played as Indonesia defeated Turkey 2–0 in the semi-finals. In the final game, Faidan played alongside Elga as they defeat Brazil 2–0, being crowned as FIFAe World Cup champions.

=== 2025-present ===
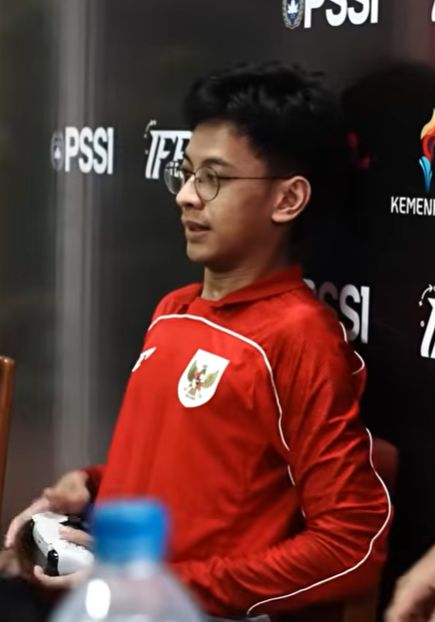
Faidan in 2025

On 18 February 2025, RRQ announced that Faidan had joined its eFootball console division, alongside Elga. In September 2025, Faidan won the 2025 Indonesian Football Esports Championship held in Tangerang. In November 2025, Faidan finished as runner-up in the IFeLeague 1 after losing to EVOS Esports in the grand finals. On 12 December 2025, Faidan and Elga failed to defend their FIFAe World Cup title after losing to Italy's Ettorito and Naples in the semifinals.

== Notable achievements ==
Year	Tournament	Placement	Ref.
2016	SEACL National Qualifier	1st	
2016	SEACL Finals	2nd	
2018	Asian Games National Qualifier	1st	
2019	TFEF SEAFinals	1st	
2019	PES League National Finals: Asia	2nd	
2019	AXIS PES League Season 1 Playoffs	1st	
2019	PES League Regional Finals: Asia CO-OP	1st	
2019	PES League Regional Finals: Asia 1v1	1st	
2019	PES League World Finals CO-OP	2nd	
2019	PES League World Finals 1v1	3rd	
2020	Toyota E-League	1st	
2020	Indonesian Football eLeague	1st	
2021	Toyota E-League	1st	
2021	eFootball.Open World Finals PS4 Asia	3rd	
2021	PON XX Papua	1st	
2021	Indonesian eFootball Cup	1st	
2022	Indonesian Football eLeague	1st	
2023	Indonesian eFootball Cup	1st	
2024	AFC eAsian Cup	1st	
2024	FIFAe World Cup ft. eFootball	1st	
2025	Indonesian Football Esports Championship	1st	
2025	IFeLeague 1 featuring eFootball Console	2nd	
2025	FIFAe World Cup ft. eFootball	3rd-4th	
