= FIFAe World Cup =

Esports tournament series

Tournament information
- Game: FIFA (2004–2023); Football Manager (2024–present); Rocket League (2024–present) eFootball (2024–present)
- Established: 2004
- Number of tournaments: 17
- Administrator: FIFA
- Format: Online
- Website: fifa.gg

Most recent tournament
- 2026 FIFAe World Cup featuring Rocket League; 2026 FIFAe World Cup featuring eFootball

The FIFAe World Cup, formerly the FIFA Interactive World Cup (FIWC) and the FIFA eWorld Cup, is an esports tournament series held by FIFA. From its inception until 2023, the tournaments were held on the latest incarnation of the FIFA association football video game series. The open qualifying format for the tournament allowed millions to compete in the initial online stages, which resulted in the FIWC being recognized as the largest online esports game by Guinness World Records. Due to FIFA and EA Sports parting ways after the release of FIFA 23 and EA launching their own esports circuit known as EA Sports FC Pro for the EA Sports FC series, the FIFAe World Cup has shifted to a football-focused tournament series, with eFootball, Football Manager and Rocket League having tournaments in 2024.

The last FIFAe World Cup champion from the FIFA series was Manuel Bachoore from the Netherlands. Ichsan Taufiq from Indonesia and Minbappe from Malaysia is the current champion from the Football Manager series in console and mobile respectively, while Saudi Arabia's Team Falcons are the current champions from the Rocket League series.

== History ==
The inaugural FIWC took place in 2004 in Switzerland, over the years the tournament has grown significantly. In 2010, the FIWC first appeared in the Guinness World Records – but it was not until 2013 that the competition saw the current record of more than 2.5 million players signing up.

On 1 October 2015, the FIWC 16 kicked off, marking the 12th edition of the tournament. For the first time in the history of the competition Xbox One and PlayStation 4 players competed against each other. With the integration of the new consoles the number of participants increased significantly, compared to previous years when the FIWC was only available on PlayStation 3. 2.3 million players attempted to qualify for the Grand Final in New York City. On 22 March 2016, Mohamad Al-Bacha from Denmark won the FIWC title in the Apollo Theater, beating Sean Allen from England in the final match.

In 2018, the FIFA Interactive World Cup (FIWC) was renamed to the FIFA eWorld Cup (FeWC). The 2018 Grand Finals was held between 2 August 2018 through 4 August 2018 in the O2 Arena in London, England. 32 finalists (16 on PlayStation 4 and 16 on Xbox One) competed in the group stage and round of 16 on 2 August 2018, with the second leg of the round of 16 and the quarterfinals taking place on 3 August 2018. The semi-finals and final took place on 4 August 2018.

In October 2020, the FIFA eWorld Cup was rebranded as the FIFAe World Cup as part of FIFA's launch of its FIFAe esports tournament series.

Due to EA and FIFA not renewing their licensing agreement after FIFA 23, the 2023 FIFAe World Cup was the last edition involving EA's football video game series. EA themselves announced a replacement tournament circuit known as EA Sports FC Pro to coincide with the series rebranding to EA Sports FC starting with EAFC 24, with its world championship known as the EA Sports FC Pro World Championship.

On 23 June 2024, FIFA announced that the FIFAe World Cup would return that year with a Rocket League tournament, which consisted of national teams. FIFA later announced on 27 June that the FIFAe World Cup would also feature a Football Manager tournament, officially known as the "FIFAe World Cup of Football Manager" (later the "FIFAe World Cup featuring Football Manager". On 10 October, FIFA would announce a partnership with Konami that would see eFootball join the series.

== Results ==
=== FIFA ===
Year	Dates	Host	Winner (Gamer ID) [Console Bracket]	Runner-up (Gamer ID) [Console Bracket]	Score
2004	19 December	(Switzerland) Zürich	(Brazil) Thiago Carrico de Azevedo	(United States) Matija Biljeskovic	2–1
2005	19 December	(England) London	(England) Chris Bullard	(Hungary) Gábor Mokos	5–2
2006	9 December	(Netherlands) Amsterdam	(Netherlands) Andries Smit	(Austria) Wolfgang Meier	6–4
2008	24 May	(Germany) Berlin	(Spain) Alfonso Ramos	(United States) Michael Ribeiro	3–1
2009	2 May	(Spain) Barcelona	(France) Bruce Grannec	(Mexico) Ruben Morales Zerecero	3–1
2010	1 May	(Spain) Barcelona	(Serbia) Nenad Stojkovic	(Germany) Ayhan Altundag	2–1
2011	7–9 June	(United States) Los Angeles	(Portugal) Francisco Cruz (Quinzas)	(Colombia) Javier Munoz (Janoz)	4–1
2012	21–23 May	(United Arab Emirates) Dubai	(Spain) Alfonso Ramos	(France) Bruce Grannec	0–0 (4–3. Penalty shoot-out)
2013	6–8 May	(Spain) Madrid	(France) Bruce Grannec	(Mexico) Andrei Torres Vivero	1–0
2014	2–3 July	(Brazil) Rio de Janeiro	(Denmark) August Rosenmeier (Agge)	(England) David Bytheway (Davebtw)	3–1
2015	17–19 May	(Germany) Munich	(Saudi Arabia) Abdulaziz Alshehri (Mr D0ne) [PS4]	(France) Julien Dassonville [Xbox One]	3–0
2016	20–22 March	(United States) New York City	(Denmark) Mohamad Al-Bacha (Bacha) [PS4]	(England) Sean Allen (Dragonn) [Xbox One]	2–2, 3–3 (5–5 agg. Al-Bacha won on away goals)
2017	16–18 August	(England) London	(England) Spencer Ealing (Gorilla) [Xbox One]	(Germany) Kai Wollin (Deto) [PS4]	3–3, 4–0 (7–3 agg.)
2018	2–3 August	(England) London	(Saudi Arabia) Mosaad Al Dossary (MsDossary) [Xbox One]	(Belgium) Stefano Pinna (StefanoPinna) [PS4]	2–0, 2–0 (4–0 agg.)
2019	2–4 August	(England) London	(Germany) Mohammed Harkous (MoAuba) [PS4]	(Saudi Arabia) Mosaad Aldossary (Msdossary) [Xbox One]	1–1, 2–1 (3–2 agg.)
2020	Cancelled due to the COVID-19 pandemic				
2021	Cancelled due to the COVID-19 pandemic				
2022	14–17 July	(Denmark) Copenhagen	(Germany) Umut Gültekin (Umut)	(Argentina) Nicolas Villalba (nicolas99fc)	0–0, 0–0 (0–0 agg. Umut won 5–4 on Penalty shoot-out)
2023	16–19 July	(Saudi Arabia) Riyadh (Note: This edition of the FIFAe World Cup was held during Riyadh's Gamers8 esports festival (now known as the Esports World Cup).)	(Netherlands) Manuel Bachoore (ManuBachoore)	(Australia) Mark Zakhary (Mark11)	2–2, 1–1 (3–3 agg. ManuBachoore won 5–4 on Penalty shoot-out)

=== Football Manager ===
Year	Dates	Host	Winner	Finalist	Score
2024	29 August–1 September	(England) Liverpool	Indonesia; Ichsan Taufiq (Miracle), Manager; Manar Hidayat (wednesday), Assistant	Germany; Sven Golly (Svonn), Manager; Terry Whenett (FMZweierkette), Assistant	3–0, 5–2 (8–2 agg.)

=== eFootball - Console ===
Year	Dates	Host	Winners	Finalists	Score
2024	9–12 December	(Saudi Arabia) Riyadh	Indonesia; Rizky Faidan (BINONGBOYS), Elga Cahya Putra (SHNKS-ELGA), Mohamad Akbar Paudie (akbarpaudie)	Brazil; Guilherme Fonseca Agostini (GuiFera99), Joao Victor Ferreira Lopes (STS_Jvictor), Thiago Avaré (ThiagoAvare10)	2–1, 2–1 (4–2 agg.)
2025	10–13 December	(Saudi Arabia) Riyadh	Poland; Mikolaj Zietek (Ostrybuch), Milosz Zietek (Zilo), Rdk.GG (coach)	Italy; Ettore Giannuzzi (Suprema_Ettorito), Carmine Liuzzi (Naples), thesvnom (coach)	1–1, 1–0 (2–1 agg.)

=== eFootball - Mobile ===
Year	Dates	Host	Winners	Finalists	Score
2024	9–12 December	(Saudi Arabia) Riyadh	(Malaysia) Ahmad Muhaimin Razak (MINBAPPE)	(Morocco) Anass Moussa (AN10_Tienes)	3–0, 2–0 (5–0 agg.)
2025	10–13 December	(Saudi Arabia) Riyadh	(Thailand) Jomkata Yupraphat (JXMKT)	(Brazil) José Antonio Maciel Junior (JUNINHOEFOITBALL)	2–0, 1–1 (3–1 agg.)

=== Rocket League ===
Year	Dates	Host	Winners	Finalists	Series score (Matches)
2024	5–8 December	(Saudi Arabia) Riyadh	Saudi Arabia; Yazid Bakhashwin (Kiileerrz), Saleh Bakhashwin (Rw9), Mohammed Alotaibi (trk511)	France; Axel Touret (Vatira), Evan Rogez (M0nkeyM00n), Alexis Bernier (zen)	1–4, 1–0, 1–0, 6–1, 3–2 (4–1 agg.)
2025	15–19 December	(Saudi Arabia) Riyadh	France; Théo Sabiani (juicy), Axel Touret (Vatira), Alexis Bernier (zen)	Saudi Arabia; Yazid Bakhashwin (Kiileerrz), Saleh Bakhashwin (Rw9), Mohammed Alotaibi (trk511)	2–1, 2–1, 2–5, 1–2, 2–1, 2-1 (4–2 agg.)

== Summary ==
Teams reaching the final
Team	Titles	Runners-up	Top 2 total
France	3 (2009, 2013, 2025b)	3 (2012, 2015, 2024b)	6
Saudi Arabia	3 (2015, 2018, 2024b)	2 (2019, 2025b)	5
Germany	2 (2019, 2022)	3 (2010, 2017, 2024a)	5
England	2 (2005, 2017)	2 (2014, 2016)	4
Brazil	1 (2004)	2 (2024d, 2025c)	3
Netherlands	2 (2006, 2023)		2
Spain	2 (2008, 2012)		2
Denmark	2 (2014, 2016)		2
Indonesia	2 (2024a, 2024d)		2
Serbia	1 (2010)		1
Portugal	1 (2011)		1
Malaysia	1 (2024c)		1
Thailand	1 (2025c)		1
Poland	1 (2025d)		1
USA		2 (2004, 2008)	2
Mexico		2 (2009, 2013)	2
Hungary		1 (2005)	1
Austria		1 (2006)	1
Colombia		1 (2011)	1
Belgium		1 (2018)	1
Argentina		1 (2022)	1
Australia		1 (2023)	1
Morocco		1 (2024c)	1
Italy		1 (2025d)	1

a: FIFAe World Cup featuring Football Manager. b: FIFAe World Cup featuring Rocket League. c: FIFAe World Cup featuring eFootball (mobile). d: FIFAe World Cup featuring eFootball (console).

== Format ==
=== FIFA ===
==== Online qualification ====
The FeWC online qualification took place on PlayStation and Xbox networks, and was accessed through the latest version of EA Sports FIFA on Xbox One and PS4. The players qualified via the console playoffs, where the top 16 players made it through to the eWorld Cup finals. Players could also qualify for the FeWC by competing in one of the FIFA Global Series tournaments throughout the season, with the top 16 at the last event automatically qualifying for the FeWC.

In the 2022 and 2023 editions, games were played on PlayStation 5 console only. 128 players were selected for the FIFA Global Series Playoffs, which included 74 via the Regional Global Series Rankings and 54 via Partner Leagues, such as eMLS and the Virtual Bundesliga.

==== Grand Finals ====
32 players competed at the Grand Finals of the FeWC. The participants were divided into four groups (two for each console) with the top 16 players moving on to the knockout stage. While the Group stage, Round of 16, Quarter-finals and Semi-finals were played on one console (Xbox One or PS4), the Final was a two-leg match with one game on each console. The Grand Final is a multi-day event with draw and competition being broken up into three days. The winner is crowned in a live show at the end of the event.

In the 2022 and 2023 editions, which were all exclusively played on the PS5, the Group Stage consisted of double round robin single-game groups. Before the 2022 edition, these were two-legged matches in a single round robin format.

==== World ranking ====
In 2016, the FIFA Interactive World Cup World Ranking was introduced to help seed the players in the tournament according to their previous results. The ranking took into account both the qualification phase for the then-current edition and previous FeWC Grand Finals.

=== eFootball ===
==== Qualification ====
National associations who participate are selected via already existing eFootball tournament results and the size of the eFootball player community in each nation (in 2024, 18 nations were invited to the tournament). From there, all players who wish to qualify on console (exclusively on the PS4 and PS5) or on mobile must complete three rounds: Dream Team versus AI (in which players must win twice against the AI), Dream Team PVP (in which players must complete the third challenge) and Dream Team Ranking. The last 20 games played in the Dream Team Ranking round count towards the leaderboard. From there, the participating national associations may directly select the player(s) to represent their country or otherwise hold bootcamps or qualifying tournaments.

=== Football Manager ===
==== Qualification ====
The national associations that will participate in the FIFAe World Cup of Football Manager are invited based on how many players are actively playing that year's Football Manager. From there, each association may host qualifiers to determine who qualifies for the final event or invite players themselves. Each nation normally qualifies one player, while the host nation qualifies two players.

==== Main tournament ====
The 20 qualified players (as of the 2024 tournament) are put into five groups of 4 in the group stage. Each group is assigned a random club before the start of the group stage which all players will separately manage for three seasons, with the first day consisting of preparations and each day afterwards representing a season. The top player from each group after the last season, after receiving a score based on league position, cup results and other managerial duties, qualifies for the semi-finals. Players may also be eliminated if they are fired from their club before the end of the third season.

The semi-finals and final follow a fantasy draft format, in which each competitor selects 25 players based on an allocated talent pool and budget. From there, they compete in a single-elimination bracket consisting of two-legged semi-finals and a two-legged final to crown the champion.

=== Rocket League ===
==== Qualification ====
The 16 national teams that take part in the FIFAe World Cup are decided via the nationalities of the players that made up the Rocket League Championship Series (RLCS) Majors for that year, as well as active Rocket League playerbases. Once the national teams have been announced, players qualify for the tournament via winning their national association's qualifiers, thereby earning the right to represent their country.

== Prize fund ==
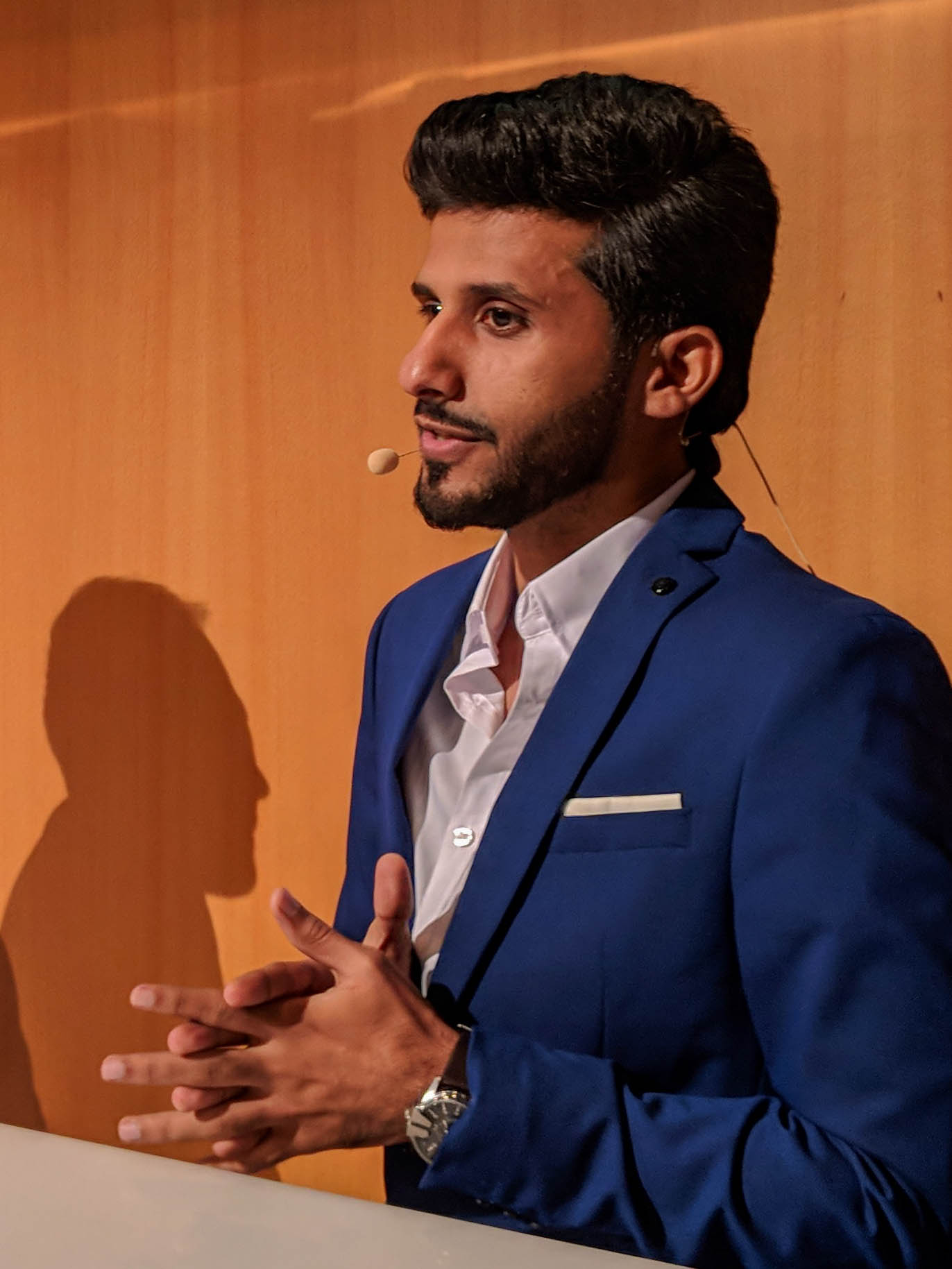
FIWC 15 winner Abdulaziz "Mr D0ne" al-Shehri

The FeWC 2018 champion, Mosaad Al Dossary, received $250,000 in prize money and a ticket to that year's edition of The Best FIFA Football Awards, where he had a chance to meet the greatest players in the real football world. FIWC 2015 Champion Abdulaziz Alshehri from Saudi Arabia was able to meet Cristiano Ronaldo and Lionel Messi among many others, while 2016 champion Mohammad Al-Bacha talked to Marcelo Vieira and Manuel Neuer. The runner-up received $50,000 in prize money.

The winner of the FIFAe World Cup 2023, the final edition held on the FIFA series of games, received $300,000 in prize money.

The 2024 FIFAe World Cup of Football Manager will consist of a $100,000 prize pool.

== Trophy ==
The winner's trophy of the FIFAe World Cup is by London silverware manufacturers, Thomas Lyte. The trophy is made from a combination of silver and gold plate and stands at 50cm tall.

== Broadcast ==
The FeWC Grand Finals is streamed live on YouTube and Twitch. For the first time, the Final Showdown of the FIWC16 was also broadcast on TV and was shown in more than 100 countries around the world. Fox Sports 1 showed the Final live in the United States. The show was moderated by host Kay Murray. Former US footballer Alexi Lalas and Spencer Carmichael-Brown (Spencer FC) analyzed the matches, Leigh Smith and John Strong commentated the games. The trophy was handed over by former Spanish International David Villa.

== See also ==
- FIFAe Nations Cup
- AFC eAsian Cup
- Rocket League Championship Series
