= 2024 FIFAe World Cup featuring Football Manager =

2024 FIFAe World Cup of Football Manager

Tournament details
- Country: England
- Dates: 29 August—1 September 2024
- Teams: 20

Final positions
- Champions: Indonesia (Ichsan Taufiq, Manager - Manar Hidayat, Assistant)
- Runners-up: Germany (Sven Goly, Manager - Terry Whenett, Assistant)

The 2024 FIFAe World Cup of Football Manager was part of the 18th edition of the FIFAe World Cup (formerly the FIFA Interactive World Cup and FIFA eWorld Cup), and the first tournament to be played on Football Manager, specifically Football Manager 2024. The tournament was held between 29 August and 1 September in Liverpool, England. 20 managers representing 19 FIFA members took part, competing for a US$100,000 prize pool.

Ichsan Taufiq of Indonesia won the tournament, defeating Germany's Sven Goly 8-2 on aggregate.

== Format ==
The tournament will be separated into a group stage and a final Fantasy Draft knockout stage. The 20 participants will be split into four groups of five, with each player managing the same club in their group through three in-game seasons. Players will be ranked based on league position, cup progress, and managerial ratings. Clubs will be set up identically to ensure equal playing conditions.

The four group winners will compete in a Fantasy Draft knockout competition, with the semi-finals and finals being played over two aggregate legs. The four semi-finalists are given US$274 million to draft a 25-player squad from a 2,500-player pool.

=== Points distribution (group stage) ===
- League - 50 points for win, lower points are scored the further down a team is
  - For example, 1st place earns 50 points, 2nd earns 40 points
- Cups - 2 points for winning individual rounds, 5 points for winning the final
- Continental competitions - 5 points for advancing in the primary competition, 3 for advancing in the secondary competition
  - For winning, 15 points for the primary competition, 10 points for the secondary competition
- Managerial rating - 10 points for an A, 8 for a B, 6 for a C
- Challenge of the Day - Each manager is assigned a challenge to complete for each of the three days; 5 points for completion

== Background ==
Football Manager was announced as one of the two games that would be played at the FIFAe World Cup, alongside Rocket League, after the FIFA game series by EA Sports was removed. Arsène Wenger, former Arsenal manager, supported the project as an ambassador for the event.

== Qualification ==
Each of the 19 invited confederations will host their own qualifying tournaments or to determine their representative or internally invite a player. Players who lived the invited countries can sign up to participate on the official FIFA esports website. The All India Football Federation hosted their qualification tournament on 21 July 2024. 9 other federations held their own online qualifiers, while the rest selected their entrants internally; federations with qualifiers could choose the next-best players if their winners couldn't travel to Liverpool. The official list, including assistant managers, was revealed on 17 August.

| Federation | Qualifying Tournament | Player |
|---|---|---|
| (England) The FA (hosts) | Internal selection | Jack Peachman (WorkTheSpace); Assistant: Tom Kelsey (TomFM) |
| (England) The FA (hosts) | Internal selection | Arron Falloon (RDF_Tactics); Assistant: Matt Mullen (SecondYellowCard) |
| (Belgium) RBFA | 2024 Domestic Qualification Event - Belgium | Jean-François Leclercq (jfrscl); Assistant: Michaël Vanderheyden (Michaeleke) |
| (France) FFF | Internal selection | Florian Gripon; Assistant: Joël Digbeu |
| (Germany) DFB | 2024 Domestic Qualifier Event - Germany | Sven Goly (Svonn); Assistant: Terry Whenett (FMZweierkette) |
| (India) AIFF | 2024 Domestic Qualification Event - India | Nirjhar Mitra (jocse02); Assistant: Aadit Mehta (MaNamesJeff) |
| (Indonesia) PSSI | 2024 Domestic Qualifier Event - Indonesia | Ichsan Taufiq (Miracle); Assistant: Manar Hidayat (wednesday) |
| (South Korea) KFA | Internal selection | Jay Ryung-huh (MU013); Assistant: Yeon Deok-hwang (awesomejuanito) |
| (Lithuania) LFF | Internal selection | Aivaras Nekliuda (aivaras.n); Assistant: Justinas Butkevicius (Wigo15) |
| (Malaysia) FAM | Internal selection | Noor Muhammad Kamaruddin (Matt-K); Assistant: Muhammad Naqsyabandi Bin Absah (aysqan) |
| (Netherlands) KNVB | Internal selection (Note: A Domestic Qualifier Event featuring two groups was held for the Netherlands, but neither winner (ImNotMini or Hadoska) was selected. The Group B runner-up was selected to be manager instead.) | Rowan van Leeuwen (SirRowanXIV); Assistant: Renzo Oemrawsingh (Renzo) |
| (Norway) NFF | Internal selection | Mats Andre Breesth (RandomNorwegian); Assistant: Matsemaen Jellestad |
| (Peru) FPF | Internal selection (Note: A Domestic Qualifier Event was held for Peru, but the winner, quisPepHuardiola, wasn't selected. The third-place player was selected to be manager instead.) | Roberto Milla (crmilla2094); Assistant: Juan Diego De La Piedra (jdlpgl) |
| (Poland) PZPN | 2024 Domestic Qualification Event Poland (Note: For Poland, two qualifying groups were held. One group winner became the manager, while the other became the assistant manager.) | Patryk Zamirski (patrik); Assistant: Michał Morka (morazz) |
| (Portugal) FPF | Internal selection (Note: A Domestic Qualifier Event was held for Portugal, but the winner, LinkinCity_PDQAI, wasn't selected. The runner-up was selected to be manager instead.) | Daniel Almeida (Lica); Assistant: Francisco Cruz (FranciscoCruz) |
| (Saudi Arabia) SAFF | Internal selection | Mohanned Alem (DiamondSnake); Assistant: Nawaf Alhazmi (kingnaawaf) |
| (South Africa) SAFA | 2024 Domestic Qualifier Event South Africa | Enzo Bento (Enzo); Assistant: Tanweer Fakie (KingTaf19) |
| (Spain) RFEF | Internal selection | José Manuel Muñoz Sánchez (JoseLock08); Assistant: Manuel Gómez (HanLolo) |
| (Switzerland) ASF-SFV | Internal selection | Yannick Hauser (jayjay103000); Assistant: Nico Gasser (santilibran) |
| (Turkey) TFF | 2024 Domestic Qualification Event Türkiye | Cafer Arslan (cfrarsln25); Assistant: Emre Öztürk (Fmanaliz) |

== Group stage ==
=== Group A (Yokohama F. Marinos) ===
| Rank | Manager | Season 1 score | Season 2 score | Season 3 score | Total score | Qualification |
|---|---|---|---|---|---|---|
| 1 | (Germany) Sven Goly | 129 | 136 | 160 | 425 | Qualified for the knockout stage |
| 2 | (Turkey) Cafer Arslan | 124 | 136 | 139 | 399 | Eliminated from the tournament |
| 3 | (Belgium) Jean-François Leclercq | 117 | 121 | 138 | 376 | Eliminated from the tournament |
| 4 | (Norway) Mats André Breesth | 104 | 136 | 132 | 372 | Eliminated from the tournament |
| 5 | (Saudi Arabia) Mohanned Alem | 105 | 106 | 103 | 314 | Eliminated from the tournament |

==== Detailed results ====
(Norway) Mats André Breesth

| Season | J1 League position | Emperor's Cup result | J.League Cup result | Japanese Super Cup results | AFC competition result | Managerial rating | Season score |
|---|---|---|---|---|---|---|---|
| 1 | 1st (50 points) | Winners (15 points) 10 for round wins, 5 for overall win | Winners (11 points) 6 for round wins, 5 for overall win | Lost (0 points) | Finalist in Champions League (20 points) | B (8 points) | 104 points |
| 2 | 1st (50 points) | Winners (15 points) 10 for round wins, 5 for overall win | Winners (13 points) 8 for round wins, 5 for overall win | Won (5 points) | Champions League winners (40 points) 25 points for round advancements, 15 points for winning Final | B (8 points) Challenge of Day completed (5 points) | 136 points |
| 3 | 1st (50 points) | | | | | | |

(Turkey) Cafer Arslan

| Season | J1 League position | Emperor's Cup result | J.League Cup result | Japanese Super Cup results | AFC competition result | Managerial rating | Season score |
|---|---|---|---|---|---|---|---|
| 1 | 1st (50 points) | Winners (15 points) 10 for round wins, 5 for overall win | Winners (11 points) 6 for round wins, 5 for overall win | Won (5 points) | Champions League winners (35 points) 20 points for round advancements, 15 points for winning Final | B (8 points) | 124 points |
| 2 | 1st (50 points) | Winners (15 points) 10 for round wins, 5 for overall win | Winners (13 points) 8 for round wins, 5 for overall win | Won (5 points) | Champions League winners (40 points) 25 points for round advancements, 15 points for winning Final | B (8 points) Challenge of Day completed (5 points) | 136 points |
| 3 | 1st (50 points) | Winners (15 points) 10 for round wins, 5 for overall win | Winners (13 points) 8 for round wins, 5 for overall win | Won (5 points) | | B (8 points) Challenge of Day completed (5 points) | |

(Saudi Arabia) Mohanned Alem

| Season | J1 League position | Emperor's Cup result | J.League Cup result | Japanese Super Cup results | AFC competition result | Managerial rating | Season score |
|---|---|---|---|---|---|---|---|
| 1 | 1st (50 points) | Eliminated in third round (2 points) | Eliminated in the group stage (0 points) | Won (5 points) | Champions League winners (35 points) 20 points for round advancements, 15 points for winning Final | B (8 points) Challenge of Day completed (5 points) | 106 points |
| 2 | 1st (50 points) | Eliminated in second round (0 points) | Winners (13 points) 8 for round wins, 5 for overall win | Won (5 points) | Finalist in Champions League (25 points) | B (8 points) Challenge of Day completed (5 points) | 106 points |
| 3 | 1st (50 points) | Winners (15 points) 10 for round wins, 5 for overall win | Eliminated in the semi-finals (6 points) | Won (5 points) | | B (8 points) | |

(Germany) Sven Goly

| Season | J1 League position | Emperor's Cup result | J.League Cup result | Japanese Super Cup results | AFC competition result | Managerial rating | Season score |
|---|---|---|---|---|---|---|---|
| 1 | 1st (50 points) | Winners (15 points) 10 for round wins, 5 for overall win | Winners (11 points) 6 for round wins, 5 for overall win | Won (5 points) | Champions League winners (35 points) 20 points for round advancements, 15 points for winning Final | B (8 points) Challenge of Day completed (5 points) | 129 points |
| 2 | 1st (50 points) | Winners (15 points) 10 for round wins, 5 for overall win | Winners (13 points) 8 for round wins, 5 for overall win | Won (5 points) | Champions League winners (40 points) 25 points for round advancements, 15 points for winning Final | B (8 points) Challenge of Day completed (5 points) | 136 points |
| 3 | 1st (50 points) | Winners (15 points) 10 for round wins, 5 for overall win | Winners (13 points) 8 for round wins, 5 for overall win | Won (5 points) | | A (10 points) Challenge of Day completed (5 points) | |

(Belgium) Jean-François Leclercq

| Season | J1 League position | Emperor's Cup result | J.League Cup result | Japanese Super Cup results | AFC competition result | Managerial rating | Season score |
|---|---|---|---|---|---|---|---|
| 1 | 1st (50 points) | Winners (15 points) 10 for round wins, 5 for overall win | Semi-final loss (4 points) | Lost (0 points) | Champions League winners (35 points) 20 points for round advancements, 15 points for winning Final | B (8 points) Challenge of Day completed (5 points) | 117 points |
| 2 | 1st (50 points) | Winners (15 points) 10 for round wins, 5 for overall win | Winners (13 points) 8 for round wins, 5 for overall win | Won (5 points) | Finalist in Champions League (25 points) | B (8 points) Challenge of Day completed (5 points) | 121 points |
| 3 | 1st (50 points) | Semi-final loss (8 points) | Winners (13 points) 8 for round wins, 5 for overall win | | | B (8 points) Challenge of Day completed (5 points) | |

=== Group B (Brighton & Hove Albion F.C.) ===
| Rank | Manager | Season 1 score | Season 2 score | Season 3 score | Total score | Qualification |
|---|---|---|---|---|---|---|
| 1 | (South Africa) Enzo Bento | 77 | 118 | 138 | 333 | Qualified for the knockout stage |
| 2 | (Netherlands) Rowan van Leeuwen | 81 | 90 | 118 | 289 | Eliminated from the tournament |
| 3 | (Spain) José Manuel Muñoz Sánchez | 67 | 108 | 113 | 288 | Eliminated from the tournament |
| 4 | (Portugal) Daniel Almeida | 65 | 107 | 89 | 261 | Eliminated from the tournament |
| 5 | (South Korea) Jay Ryung-huh | 67 | 87 | 101 | 255 | Eliminated from the tournament |

==== Detailed results ====
(Portugal) Daniel Almeida

| Season | Premier League position | FA Cup result | EFL Cup result | Community Shield result | UEFA competition result | Managerial rating | Season score |
|---|---|---|---|---|---|---|---|
| 1 | 5th (34 points) | Eliminated in fifth round (4 points) | Eliminated in third round (0 points) | Did not qualify (0 points) | Semi-final loss in Europa League (12 points) | A (10 points) Challenge of Day completed (5 points) | 65 points |
| 2 | 1st (50 points) | Eliminated in fifth round (4 points) | Winners (13 points) 8 for round wins, 5 for overall win | Did not qualify (0 points) | Semi-final loss in Champions League (25 points) | A (10 points) Challenge of Day completed (5 points) | 107 points |
| 3 | 4th (36 points) | | Eliminated in third round (0 points) | Winners (5 points) | | B (8 points) Challenge of Day completed (5 points) | |

(Netherlands) Rowan van Leeuwen

| Season | Premier League position | FA Cup result | EFL Cup result | Community Shield result | UEFA competition result | Managerial rating | Season score |
|---|---|---|---|---|---|---|---|
| 1 | 4th (36 points) | Eliminated in fourth round (2 points) | Winners (13 points) 8 for round wins, 5 for overall win | Did not qualify (0 points) | Round of 16 loss in Europa League (6 points) | A (10 points) Challenge of Day completed (5 points) | 81 points |
| 2 | 2nd (40 points) | Winners (15 points) 10 for round wins, 5 for overall win | Eliminated in third round (0 points) | Did not qualify (0 points) | Quarter-final loss in Champions League (20 points) | A (10 points) Challenge of Day completed (5 points) | 90 points |
| 3 | 1st (50 points) | Winners (15 points) 10 for round wins, 5 for overall win | Winners (13 points) 8 for round wins, 5 for overall win | Winners (5 points) | Quarter-final loss in Champions League (20 points) | A (10 points) Challenge of Day completed (5 points) | 118 points |

(South Africa) Enzo Bento

| Season | Premier League position | FA Cup result | EFL Cup result | Community Shield result | UEFA competition result | Managerial rating | Season score |
|---|---|---|---|---|---|---|---|
| 1 | 2nd (40 points) | Eliminated in third round (0 points) | Eliminated in semi-finals (6 points) | Did not qualify (0 points) | Semi-final loss in Europa League (12 points) | A (10 points) Challenge of Day completed (5 points) | 77 points |
| 2 | 1st (50 points) | Winners (15 points) 10 for round wins, 5 for overall win | Winners (13 points) 8 for round wins, 5 for overall win | Did not qualify (0 points) | Semi-final loss in Champions League (25 points) | A (10 points) Challenge of Day completed (5 points) | 118 points |
| 3 | 1st (50 points) | | | | | A (10 points) Challenge of Day completed (5 points) | |

(South Korea) Jay Ryung-huh

| Season | Premier League position | FA Cup result | EFL Cup result | Community Shield result | UEFA competition result | Managerial rating | Season score |
|---|---|---|---|---|---|---|---|
| 1 | 6th (30 points) | Eliminated in fifth round (4 points) | Eliminated in semi-finals (6 points) | Did not qualify (0 points) | Semi-final loss in Europa League (12 points) | A (10 points) Challenge of Day completed (5 points) | 67 points |
| 2 | 3rd (36 points) | Runners-up (10 points) | Winners (13 points) 8 for round wins, 5 for overall win | Did not qualify (0 points) | Semi-final loss in Europa League (15 points) | B (8 points) Challenge of Day completed (5 points) | 87 points |
| 3 | 1st (50 points) | | | | | A (10 points) Challenge of Day completed (5 points) | |

(Spain) José Manuel Muñoz Sánchez

| Season | Premier League position | FA Cup result | EFL Cup result | Community Shield result | UEFA competition result | Managerial rating | Season score |
|---|---|---|---|---|---|---|---|
| 1 | 6th (30 points) | Eliminated in fourth round (2 points) | Runners-up (8 points) | Did not qualify (0 points) | Semi-final loss in Europa League (12 points) | A (10 points) Challenge of Day completed (5 points) | 67 points |
| 2 | 1st (50 points) | Winners (15 points) 10 for round wins, 5 for overall win | Eliminated in the third round (0 points) | Did not qualify (0 points) | Europa League winners (28 points) 18 points for round wins, 10 for overall win | A (10 points) Challenge of Day completed (5 points) | 108 points |
| 3 | 2nd (40 points) | | | Winners (5 points) | Runners-up in Super Cup (0 points) | A (10 points) Challenge of Day completed (5 points) | |

=== Group C (Sporting CP) ===
| Rank | Manager | Season 1 score | Season 2 score | Season 3 score | Total score | Qualification |
|---|---|---|---|---|---|---|
| 1 | (Indonesia) Ichsan Taufiq | 107 | 129 | 128 | 364 | Qualified for the knockout stage |
| 2 | (Poland) Patryk Zamirski | 97 | 109 | 132 | 343 | Eliminated from the tournament |
| 3 | (France) Florian Gripon | 80 | 132 | 119 | 331 | Eliminated from the tournament |
| 4 | (England) Jack Peachman | 79 | 107 | 109 | 295 | Eliminated from the tournament |
| 5 | (India) Nirjhar Mitra | 75 | 91 | 97 | 265 | Eliminated from the tournament |

==== Detailed results ====
(Poland) Patryk Zamirski

| Season | Primeira Liga position | Taça de Portugal result | Taça da Liga result | Supertaça results | UEFA competition result | Managerial rating | Season score |
|---|---|---|---|---|---|---|---|
| 1 | 1st (50 points) | Winners (15 points) 10 points for round wins, 5 for overall win | Winners (9 points) 4 points for round wins, 5 for overall win | Did not qualify (0 points) | Runners-up in Europa League (15 points) | B (8 points) | 97 points |
| 2 | 1st (50 points) | Winners (15 points) 10 points for round wins, 5 for overall win | Winners (9 points) 4 points for round wins, 5 for overall win | Winners (5 points) | Round of 16 loss in Champions League (15 points) | A (10 points) Challenge of Day completed (5 points) | 109 points |
| 3 | 1st (50 points) | | | | Champions League winners (45 points) 30 for round advancements, 15 for overall win | B (8 points) Challenge of Day completed (5 points) | |

(France) Florian Gripon

| Season | Primeira Liga position | Taça de Portugal result | Taça da Liga result | Supertaça results | UEFA competition result | Managerial rating | Season score |
|---|---|---|---|---|---|---|---|
| 1 | 1st (50 points) | Eliminated in fourth round (2 points) | Winners (9 points) 4 points for round wins, 5 for overall win | Did not qualify (0 points) | Round of 16 loss in Europa League (6 points) | B (8 points) Challenge of Day completed (5 points) | 80 points |
| 2 | 1st (50 points) | Eliminated in the semi-finals (8 points) | Winners (9 points) 4 points for round wins, 5 for overall win | Winners (5 points) | Champions League winners (45 points) 30 for round advancements, 15 for overall win | A (10 points) Challenge of Day completed (5 points) | 132 points |
| 3 | 1st (50 points) | | | | Super Cup winners (5 points) | A (10 points) Challenge of Day completed (5 points) | |

(Indonesia) Ichsan Taufiq

| Season | Primeira Liga position | Taça de Portugal result | Taça da Liga result | Supertaça results | UEFA competition result | Managerial rating | Season score |
|---|---|---|---|---|---|---|---|
| 1 | 1st (50 points) | Winners (15 points) 10 points for round wins, 5 for overall win | Winners (9 points) 4 points for round wins, 5 for overall win | Did not qualify (0 points) | Europa League winners (25 points) 15 points for round wins, 10 for overall win | B (8 points) | 107 points |
| 2 | 1st (50 points) | Winners (15 points) 10 points for round wins, 5 for overall win | Winners (9 points) 4 points for round wins, 5 for overall win | Winners (5 points) | Super Cup winners (5 points) Runners-up in Champions League (30 points) | A (10 points) Challenge of Day completed (5 points) | 129 points |
| 3 | 1st (50 points) | | Winners (9 points) 4 points for round wins, 5 for overall win | | Champions League winners (45 points) 30 for round advancements, 15 for overall win | B (8 points) Challenge of Day completed (5 points) | |

(England) Jack Peachman

| Season | Primeira Liga position | Taça de Portugal result | Taça da Liga result | Supertaça results | UEFA competition result | Managerial rating | Season score |
|---|---|---|---|---|---|---|---|
| 1 | 1st (50 points) | Eliminated in the quarter-finals (6 points | Runners-up (4 points) | Did not qualify (0 points) | Round of 16 loss in Europa League (6 points) 1st in group | B (8 points) Challenge of Day completed (5 points) | 79 points |
| 2 | 1st (50 points) | Winners (15 points) 10 points for round wins, 5 for overall win | Winners (9 points) 4 points for round wins, 5 for overall win | Winners (5 points) | Round of 16 loss in Champions League (15 points) | B (8 points) Challenge of Day completed (5 points) | 107 points |
| 3 | 1st (50 points) | Winners (15 points) 10 points for round wins, 5 for overall win | Winners (9 points) 4 points for round wins, 5 for overall win | Winners (5 points) | | A (10 points) Challenge of Day completed (5 points) | |

(India) Nirjhar Mitra

| Season | Primeira Liga position | Taça de Portugal result | Taça da Liga result | Supertaça results | UEFA competition result | Managerial rating | Season score |
|---|---|---|---|---|---|---|---|
| 1 | 1st (50 points) | Eliminated in the fourth round (2 points) | Winners (9 points) 4 points for round wins, 5 for overall win | Did not qualify (0 points) | Round of 16 loss in Europa League (6 points) 1st in group | B (8 points) | 75 points |
| 2 | 1st (50 points) | Eliminated in fourth round (2 points) | Winners (9 points) 4 points for round wins, 5 for overall win | Runners-up (0 points) | Round of 16 loss in Champions League (15 points) | A (10 points) Challenge of Day completed (5 points) | 91 points |
| 3 | 2nd (40 points) | Winners (15 points) 10 points for round wins, 5 for overall win | Winners (9 points) 4 points for round wins, 5 for overall win | Winners (5 points) | Round of 16 loss in Champions League (15 points) | B (8 points) Challenge of Day completed (5 points) | 97 points |

=== Group D (GNK Dinamo Zagreb) ===
| Rank | Manager | Season 1 score | Season 2 score | Season 3 score | Total score | Qualification |
|---|---|---|---|---|---|---|
| 1 | (England) Arron Falloon | 79 | 93 | 108 | 280 | Qualified for the knockout stage |
| 2 | (Malaysia) Noor Muhammad Kamaruddin | 85 | 86 | 98 | 269 | Eliminated from the tournament |
| 3 | (Lithuania) Aivaras Nekliuda | 85 | 84 | 96 | 265 | Eliminated from the tournament |
| 4 | (Peru) Roberto Milla | 88 | 77 | 90 | 255 | Eliminated from the tournament |
| 5 | (Switzerland) Yannick Hauser | 57 | 75 | 71 | 203 | Eliminated from the tournament |

==== Detailed results ====
(Switzerland) Yannick Hauser

| Season | HNL position | Hrvatski Kup result | Super Cup result | UEFA competition result | Managerial rating | Season score |
|---|---|---|---|---|---|---|
| 1 | 2nd (40 points) | Eliminated in the semi-finals (6 points) | Lost (0 points) | 4th in group stage of Champions League (5 points) Points earned from winning in the play-off round | C (6 points) | 57 points |
| 2 | 1st (50 points) | Eliminated in the semi-finals (6 points) | Lost (0 points) | Round of 16 loss in Conference League (6 points) 3 points by qualifying from Europa League | B (8 points) Challenge of Day completed (5 points) | 75 points |
| 3 | 2nd (40 points) | Winners (13 points) 8 points for round wins, 5 for overall win | | | B (8 points) Challenge of Day completed (5 points) | |

(Peru) Roberto Milla

| Season | HNL position | Hrvatski Kup result | Super Cup result | UEFA competition result | Managerial rating | Season score |
|---|---|---|---|---|---|---|
| 1 | 1st (50 points) | Winners (13 points) 8 points for round wins, 5 for overall win | Won (5 points) | 4th in group stage of Champions League (5 points) Points earned from winning in the play-off round | A (10 points) Challenge of Day completed (5 points) | 88 points |
| 2 | 1st (50 points) | Eliminated in the second round (2 points) | Lost (0 points) | Knock-out playoff round loss in Champions League (10 points) 5 from qualifying for the Champions League | A (10 points) Challenge of Day completed (5 points) | 77 points |
| 3 | 1st (50 points) | Winners (13 points) 8 points for round wins, 5 for overall win | Won (5 points) | Round of 16 loss in Europa League (9 points) 3 points via qualifying from the Champions League | B (8 points) Challenge of Day completed (5 points) | 90 points |

(Lithuania) Aivaras Nekliuda

| Season | HNL position | Hrvatski Kup result | Super Cup result | UEFA competition result | Managerial rating | Season score |
|---|---|---|---|---|---|---|
| 1 | 1st (50 points) | Winners (13 points) 8 points for round wins, 5 for overall win | Lost (0 points) | Round of 16 loss in Europa League (9 points) 3 points from entering via the Champions League 6 from round advancements | B (8 points) Challenge of Day completed (5 points) | 85 points |
| 2 | 1st (50 points) | Eliminated in the semi-finals (6 points) | Lost (0 points) | Round of 16 loss in Champions League (15 points) 5 from qualifying for the Champions League | B (8 points) Challenge of Day completed (5 points) | 84 points |
| 3 | 1st (50 points) | | | | B (8 points) Challenge of Day completed (5 points) | |

(Malaysia) Noor Muhammad Kamaruddin

| Season | HNL position | Hrvatski Kup result | Super Cup result | UEFA competition result | Managerial rating | Season score |
|---|---|---|---|---|---|---|
| 1 | 1st (50 points) | Winners (13 points) 8 points for round wins, 5 for overall win | Won (5 points) | Round of 16 loss in Europa League (9 points) 3 points from entering via the Champions League 6 from round advancements | B (8 points) | 85 points |
| 2 | 1st (50 points) | Winners (13 points) 8 points for round wins, 5 for overall win | Won (5 points) | Knock-out playoff round loss in Champions League (10 points) 5 from qualifying for the Champions League | B (8 points) Challenge of Day completed (5 points) | 86 points |
| 3 | 1st (50 points) | | | | A (10 points) Challenge of Day completed (5 points) | |

(England) Arron Falloon

| Season | HNL position | Hrvatski Kup result | Super Cup result | UEFA competition result | Managerial rating | Season score |
|---|---|---|---|---|---|---|
| 1 | 1st (50 points) | Eliminated in thequarter-finals (4 points) | Won (5 points) | Quarter-final loss in Europa League (12 points) 3 points from entering via the Champions League 9 from round advancements | B (8 points) | 79 points |
| 2 | 1st (50 points) | Winners (13 points) 8 points for round wins, 5 for overall win | Won (5 points) | Knock-out playoff round loss in Champions League (10 points) 5 from qualifying for the Champions League | A (10 points) Challenge of Day completed (5 points) | 93 points |
| 3 | 1st (50 points) | | | | A (10 points) Challenge of Day completed (5 points) | |

== Knockout stage ==
All start times are listed in British Summer Time (BST, GMT).

Semifinals
1 September, 13:00
(England) Aaron Falloon | 2 | 1 | 3
(Indonesia) Ichsan Taufiq | 2 | 3 | 5
1 September, 13:30
(Germany) Sven Goly | 4 | 1 | 5
(South Africa) Enzo Bento | 0 | 1 | 1

Final
1 September, 16:00
(Indonesia) Ichsan Taufiq | 3 | 5 | 8
(Germany) Sven Goly | 0 | 2 | 2

=== Semifinals ===
1 September 2024
13:00

| (England) Aaron Falloon | 2–2 | (Indonesia) Ichsan Taufiq |
|---|---|---|
| Conceição 12'; Emegha 82' | | Insigne 5'; Seiwald 53' |

1 September 2024
14:00

| (Indonesia) Ichsan Taufiq | 3–1 | (England) Aaron Falloon |
|---|---|---|
| Simons 8'; Füllkrug 53', 86' | | Alba 70' |

(Indonesia) Ichsan Taufiq won 5–3 on aggregate.

1 September 2024
13:30

| (Germany) Sven Goly | 4–0 | (South Africa) Enzo Bento |
|---|---|---|
| Tah 26'; Kossounou 42'; Kolo Muani 45'; Kouamé 46' |

1 September 2024
14:30

| (South Africa) Enzo Bento | 1–1 | (Germany) Sven Goly |
|---|---|---|
| M. Thuram 46' | | Kolo Muani 58' |

(Germany) Sven Goly won 5–1 on aggregate.

=== Final ===
1 September 2024
16:00

| (Germany) Sven Goly | 0–3 | (Indonesia) Ichsan Taufiq |
|---|---|---|
| | | Lookman 5'; Füllkrug 19'; Seiwald 69' |

1 September 2024
16:30

| (Indonesia) Ichsan Taufiq | 5–2 | (Germany) Sven Goly |
|---|---|---|
| Politano 16'; Simons 20'; Füllkrug 66', 85'; Grimaldo 90' | | Moffi 50'; Giannoulis 52' |

(Indonesia) Ichsan Taufiq won 8–2 on aggregate.
