= Konami =

Japanese entertainment and video game company

Konami Group Corporation

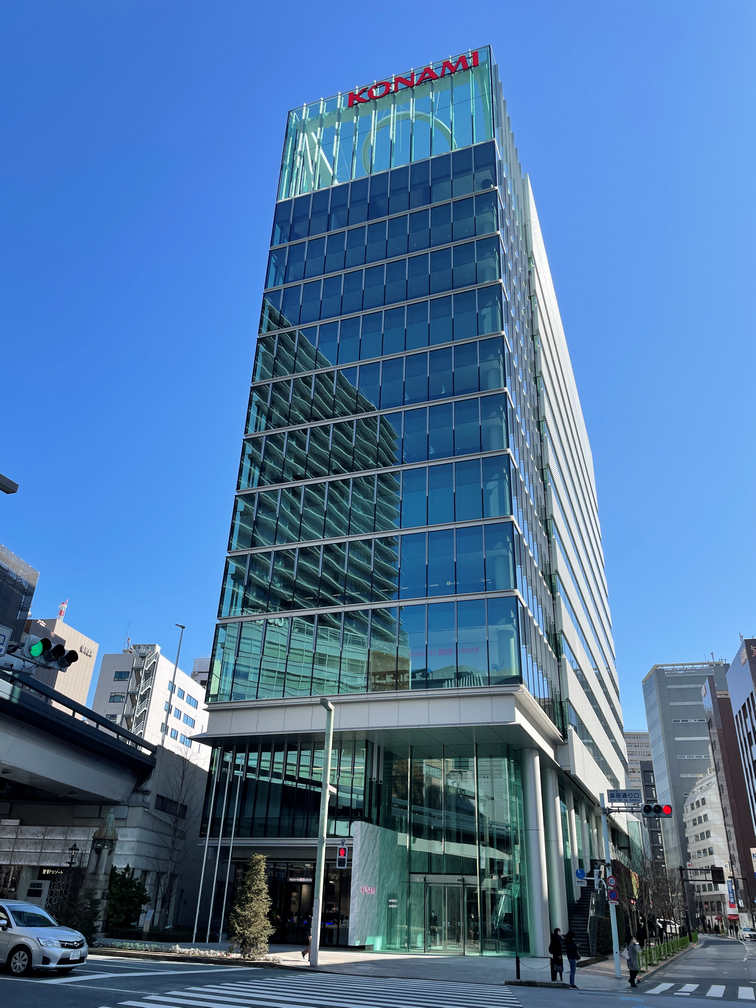
- Headquarters in Ginza, Chūō, Tokyo
- Native name: コナミグループ株式会社
- Romanized name: Konami Gurūpu kabushiki-gaisha
- Formerly: Konami Industry Co., Ltd. (1973–1991); Konami Co., Ltd (1991–2000); Konami Corporation (2000–2015); Konami Holdings Corporation (2015–2022)
- Type: Public
- Traded as: TYO: 9766; LSE: KNM; Nikkei 225 Component
- ISIN: JP3300200007
- Industry: Video games; Entertainment
- Founded: 21 March 1969; 57 years ago
- Founders: Kagemasa Kōzuki; Yoshinobu Nakama; Tatsuo Miyasako
- Headquarters: Ginza, Chūō, Tokyo, Japan
- Area served: Worldwide
- Key people: Kagemasa Kōzuki (chairman); Kimihiko Higashio (president)
- Revenue: ▲¥308 billion (09/2026)
- Operating income: ▲¥111.3 billion (09/2026)
- Net income: ▲¥79.2 billion (09/2026)
- Owner: Kōzuki family (33%)(09/2026)
- Number of employees: Konami (total); 9,477 (09/2026); Konami Digital Entertainment Co., Ltd. 2,244 (09/2026); Konami Arcade Games; 543 (09/2026); Konami Sports; 4,691 (09/2026); Konami Amusement; 347 (09/2026)
- Subsidiaries: List of Konami subsidiaries
- Website: www.konami.com/en/

Konami Group Corporation (Japanese: コナミグループ株式会社, Hepburn: Konami Gurūpu kabushiki-gaisha), commonly known as Konami (コナミ; stylized in all caps), (Note: IPA: /koʊˈnɑːmi/ koh-NAH-mee, Japanese: [koꜜnami]) is a Japanese multinational entertainment company, video game developer and publisher headquartered in Chūō, Tokyo. The company also produces and distributes trading cards, anime, tokusatsu, pachinko machines, slot machines, and arcade cabinets; It has casinos around the world, and operates health and physical fitness clubs across Japan.

The company founded in 1969 as a jukebox rental and repair business in Toyonaka, Osaka, Japan, founded by a Kagemasa Kōzuki, who remains the company's chairman. On top of its flagship development subsidiary, Konami also owns Bemani, known for Dance Dance Revolution and Beatmania, as well as the assets of former game developer Hudson Soft, known for Bomberman, Adventure Island, Bonk, Bloody Roar, and Star Soldier. Konami is the thirteenth-largest game company in the world by revenue.

The company also publishes the Yu-Gi-Oh! Trading Card Game, one of the best-selling TCGs in history. Konami's video game franchises include Metal Gear, Silent Hill, Power Pros, Bomberman, Castlevania, Contra, Frogger, Tokimeki Memorial, Gradius, Parodius, Yu-Gi-Oh!, Suikoden, and eFootball (including its predecessors International Superstar Soccer and Pro Evolution Soccer).

== History ==
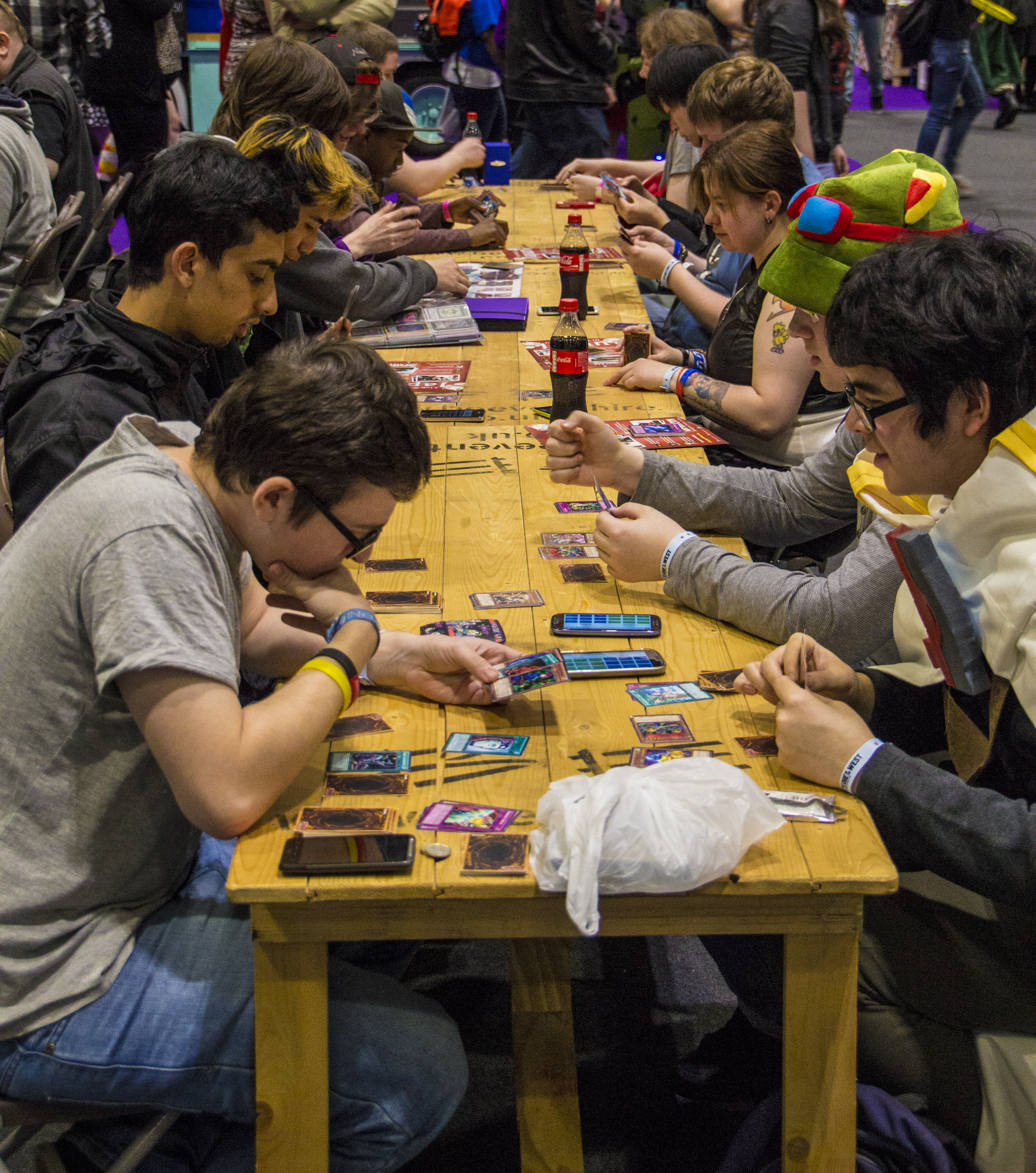
The Yu-Gi-Oh! Trading Card Game is developed and published by Konami. In 2011, Guinness World Records called it the top-selling trading card game in history, with 25.2 billion cards sold worldwide.

The company was founded on 21 March 1969, as a jukebox rental and repair business unit in Toyonaka, Osaka by the businessmen trio: Kagemasa Kōzuki, Yoshinobu Nakama, and Tatsuo Miyasako. (Note: Japanese: 上月景正、仲真良信、宮迫龍雄) Kōzuki and Miyasako met while working at Nippon Columbia's Osaka branch; Nakama, who was Miyasako's acquaintance, also worked in the music industry. The name Konami is a portmanteau of their names. By 1973, the Japanese jukebox industry was in decline, which caused the business to transition into a manufacturer of electro-mechanical arcade games. On 19 March 1973, the company was officially incorporated under the name Konami Industry Co., Ltd. (コナミ工業株式会社, Konami Kōgyō kabushiki gaisha). In the late 1970s, Konami began developing video games as a contractor for the Leijac Corporation, an early video game publisher; its first video game was Block Yard, a coin-operated Breakout clone, which released in August 1977. In January 1979, it began exporting products to the United States.

Konami began to achieve success with arcade games in the early 1980s, starting with Scramble (1981), followed by hits such as Frogger (1981), Super Cobra (1981), Time Pilot (1982), Roc'n Rope (1983), Track & Field (1983), and Yie Ar Kung-Fu (1985). Many of its early games were licensed to other companies for US release, including Centuri, Stern Electronics, Sega, and Gremlin Industries. They established its U.S. subsidiary, Konami Inc. (later Konami of America Inc., and Konami Digital Entertainment Inc.), in November 1982; initially based in Torrance, California, they would later move to Buffalo Grove, Illinois, in 1984 following their acquisition of arcade distributor Interlogic, Inc., with Interlogic founder and president Ben Harel serving as president of Konami Inc. It was during this period that Konami began expanding its video game business into the home consumer market following a brief stint releasing video games for the Atari 2600 in 1982 for the U.S. market. The company released numerous games for the MSX home computer standard in 1983, followed by the Nintendo Entertainment System in 1985. Numerous Konami franchises were established during this breakthrough period on both platforms, as well as the arcades, such as Gradius, Castlevania, TwinBee, Ganbare Goemon, Contra, and Metal Gear, in addition to success with hit licensed games such as Teenage Mutant Ninja Turtles (TMNT). Due to the success of its arcade and NES games, Konami's earnings grew from $10 million in 1987 to $300 million in 1991.

In June 1991, Konami's legal name was changed to Konami Co., Ltd. (コナミ株式会社, Konami kabushiki gaisha) and its headquarters were relocated to Minato, Tokyo, in April 1993. The company started supporting the 16-bit video game consoles during this period, starting with the Super NES in 1990, followed by the PC Engine in 1991, and the Sega Genesis in 1992. 1991 was also the year when Konami introduced a new approach to combat piracy in Teenage Mutant Ninja Turtles III: The Manhattan Project, released for the Nintendo Entertainment System (NES) in 1991. If the game detected that it was an unauthorized copy, it subtly altered gameplay mechanics. The player’s attack damage was reduced, while enemy attacks became significantly stronger. Additionally, the game's final boss, Shredder, was made invincible, rendering the game impossible to complete. This anti-piracy measure served as a deterrent to unauthorized copies by making the game frustratingly difficult for those using pirated versions.

From the late 1990s through the 2000s, the company accelerated the diversification of its business and its global expansion. After the launch of the Sega Saturn and PlayStation in 1994, Konami became a business divisional organization with the formation of various Konami Computer Entertainment (KCE) subsidiaries, starting with KCE Tokyo and KCE Osaka (later known as KCE Studios) in April 1995, followed by KCE Japan (later known as Kojima Productions) in April 1996. Each KCE subsidiary created different intellectual properties such as KCE Tokyo's Silent Hill series and KCE Japan's Metal Gear Solid series (a revival of the Metal Gear series on MSX). In 1997, Konami started producing rhythm games for arcades under the Bemani brand and branched off into the collectible card game business with the launch of the Yu-Gi-Oh! Trading Card Game, the company also entered the gaming (casino) market. Konami was not only known for its card games, it also imported into the Pachinko business. Pachinko played a huge role in Konami's success as it started to popularize new never before seen characters.

In July 2000, the company's legal English name was changed to Konami Corporation, but the Japanese legal name remained the same. As the company transitioned into developing video games for the sixth-generation consoles, they branched out into the health and fitness business acquiring People Co., Ltd. and Daiei Olympic Sports Club, Inc. which became Konami Sports, focused on sporting business and fitness clubs. In August 2001, the company invested in another video game publisher, Hudson Soft, which became a consolidated subsidiary after Konami accepted new third-party shares issued by them. In January 2003, Avranches Automatique began handling sales of Konami's arcade games in Europe outside the U.K. and Ireland. On 7 February 2003, Betson Enterprises took over distribution and service for Konami's arcade games in the U.S. Some time later, PMT Sales started handling Konami arcade game sales in the UK and Ireland.

In March 2006, Konami merged all their video game development divisions into a new wholly owned subsidiary known as Konami Digital Entertainment (KDE), as the parent company became a brand-new holding company due to its restructuring process. In order to reorganize the Konami Group and introduce a holding company system, Konami implemented a corporate spin-off for five businesses: game software, toys & hobbies, amusement, online, and multimedia. The company was established to take over these businesses (formerly located in Roppongi Hills), and their headquarters were relocated to Minato, Tokyo, in 2007. On 20 January 2009, Electrocoin became the exclusive distributor and after-sale agent of Konami's arcade games.

The merger of Hudson Soft in 2012 resulted in the addition of several other franchises including: Adventure Island, Bonk, Bloody Roar, Bomberman, Far East of Eden, and Star Soldier. In April 2015, Konami delisted itself from the New York Stock Exchange following the dissolution of its Kojima Productions subsidiary. In a translated interview with Nikkei Trendy Net published in the following month, the newly appointed president of Konami's gaming division, Konami Digital Entertainment, Hideki Hayakawa, announced that Konami would shift its focus towards mobile gaming for a while, claiming that "mobile is where the future of gaming lies."

Also in April 2015, the trade name of the company was changed from Konami Corporation to Konami Holdings Corporation during the same month, while shifted from arcade video games to console games. Konami consolidated its productions teams established in 2004 into their headquarters, including Pawapuro Production, Bemani Production, Virtual Kiss Production, Loveplus Production, Kojima Productions and others, that year. In 2017, Konami announced that they would be reviving some of the company's other well-known video game titles following the success of their Nintendo Switch launch title Super Bomberman R. In early 2020, Konami moved its headquarters to the Ginza district of Tokyo, which includes a facility for holding esports events as well as a school for esport players. In addition, to strengthen its development capabilities and secure talent in line with business expansion, the Konami Creative Front Tokyo Bay was opened in October 2025, located in Ariake, Kōtō, Tokyo as a next-generation research and development base. The group also announced will establish its corporate headquarters at Yaesu Core in Yaesu, Chuo, Tokyo by 2029, located nearby Ginza branch and Marunouchi's iconic Tokyo Station.

Konami announced a major restructuring of Konami Digital Entertainment on 25 January 2021, which including the dissolution of its Product Divisions 1, 2, and 3 to be reconsolidated into a new structure to be announced at a later time. Konami affirmed this would not affect its commitment to video games and was only an internal restructuring. On 1 July 2022 Konami changed its corporate name again from Konami Holdings Corporation to Konami Group Corporation. In April 2023, Konami announced that it has opened a new studio in Osaka, Japan. The new offices, located in the Umeda Sky Building south building, will support the developer in its efforts both grow and endure over the coming decades. Konami suggested that the new building would be a core entity in the studio's current and future projects, noting that it hopes Konami Osaka will encourage "sustainable growth" over the next 50 years.

In February 2024, Konami Digital Entertainment announced the establishment of its own anime studio called Konami Animation. The studio will invest the CG technology and know-how it fostered from game development into animation, and it plans not only to work on Konami's own intellectual properties but in other properties as well. Its first work was a PV for Yu-Gi-Oh! 25th anniversary. In May 2025, Konami announced that it would split off its arcade game business into a new subsidiary known as Konami Arcade Games (led by Bemani musician Yoshitaka Nishimura), leaving Konami Amusement to focus on pachinko and pachislot machines. In November 2025, following the successful releases of Metal Gear Solid Delta: Snake Eater and Silent Hill f, Konami signed a strategic alliance and cooperation with CyberAgent (including Cygames) and Electronic Arts (since its leveraged buyout by investors) focused on video game business, as well as the signing of the JOC/JPC, NPB, and J-League became official partners.

== Corporate structure ==
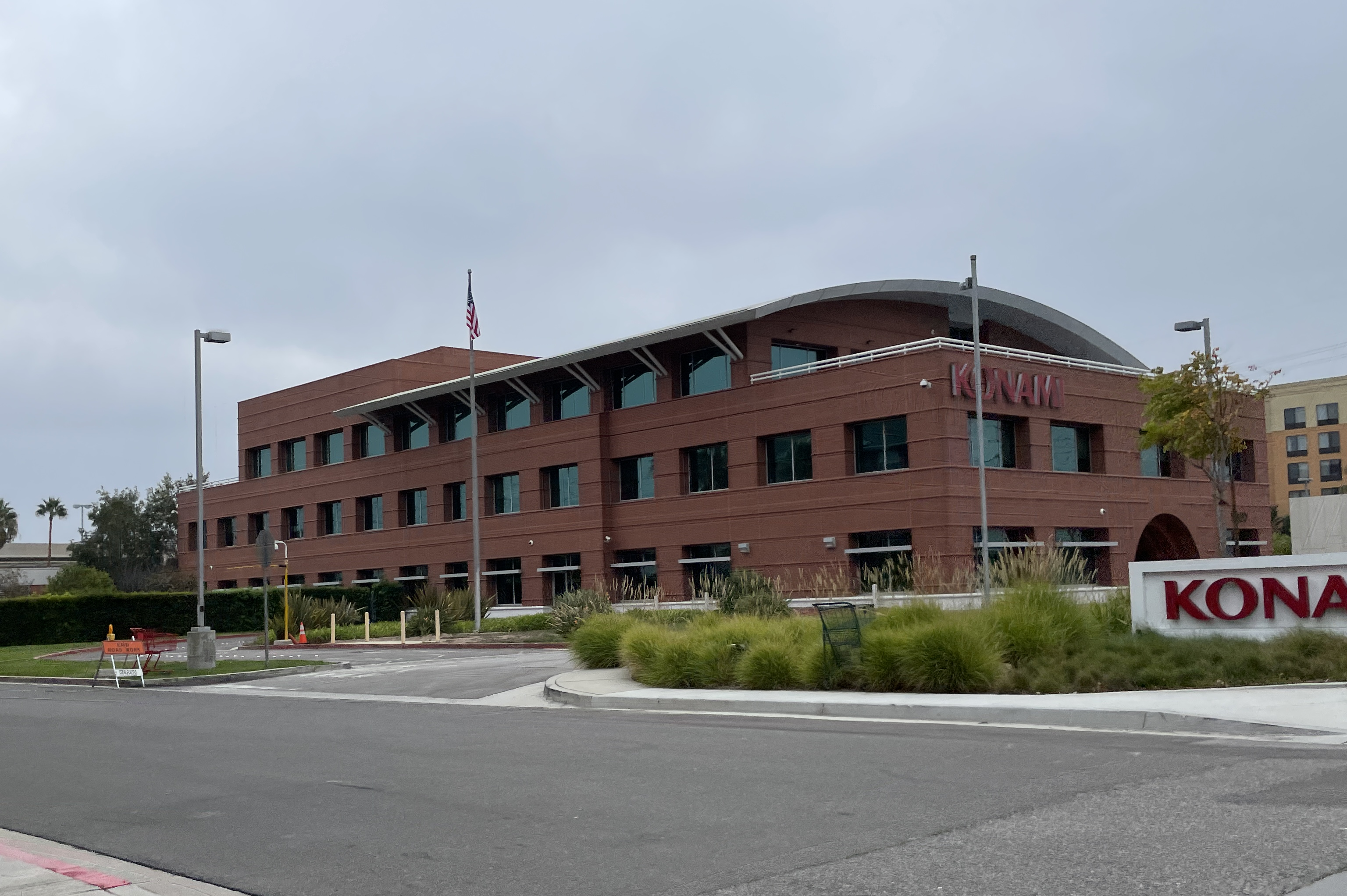
Konami Digital Entertainment's North American headquarters in Hawthorne, California

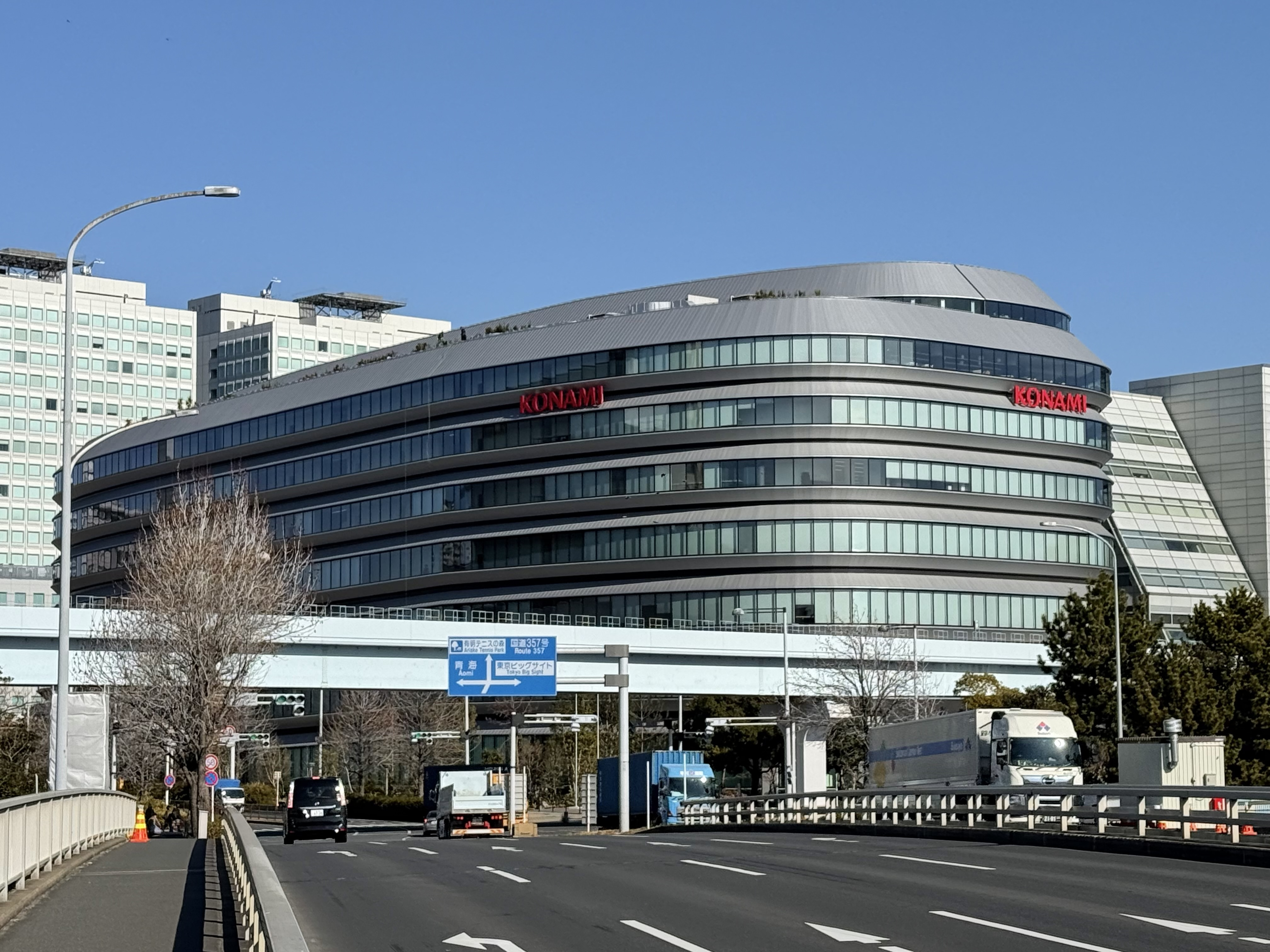
Konami Creative Front Tokyo Bay in Ariake, Kōtō, Tokyo

Konami Group is headquartered in Tokyo. In the United States, Konami manages its digital/arcade/trading card game business from Hawthorne, California, and its casino gaming business from Paradise, Nevada. Its Australian gaming operations are in Sydney. As of September 2026, it owns 26 consolidated subsidiaries around the world.

=== Japan ===
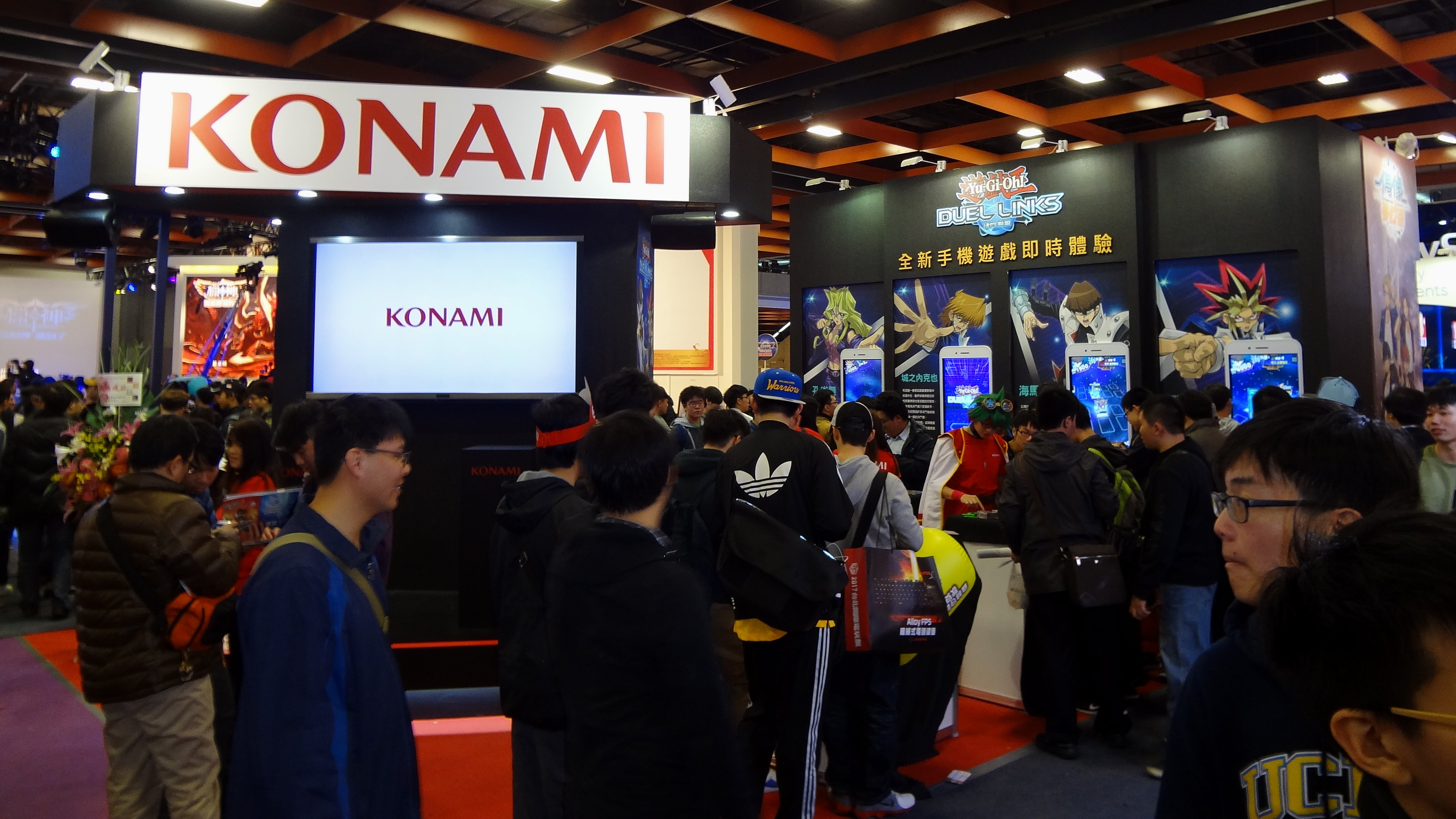
Konami Digital Entertainment booth at Taipei Game Show 2017

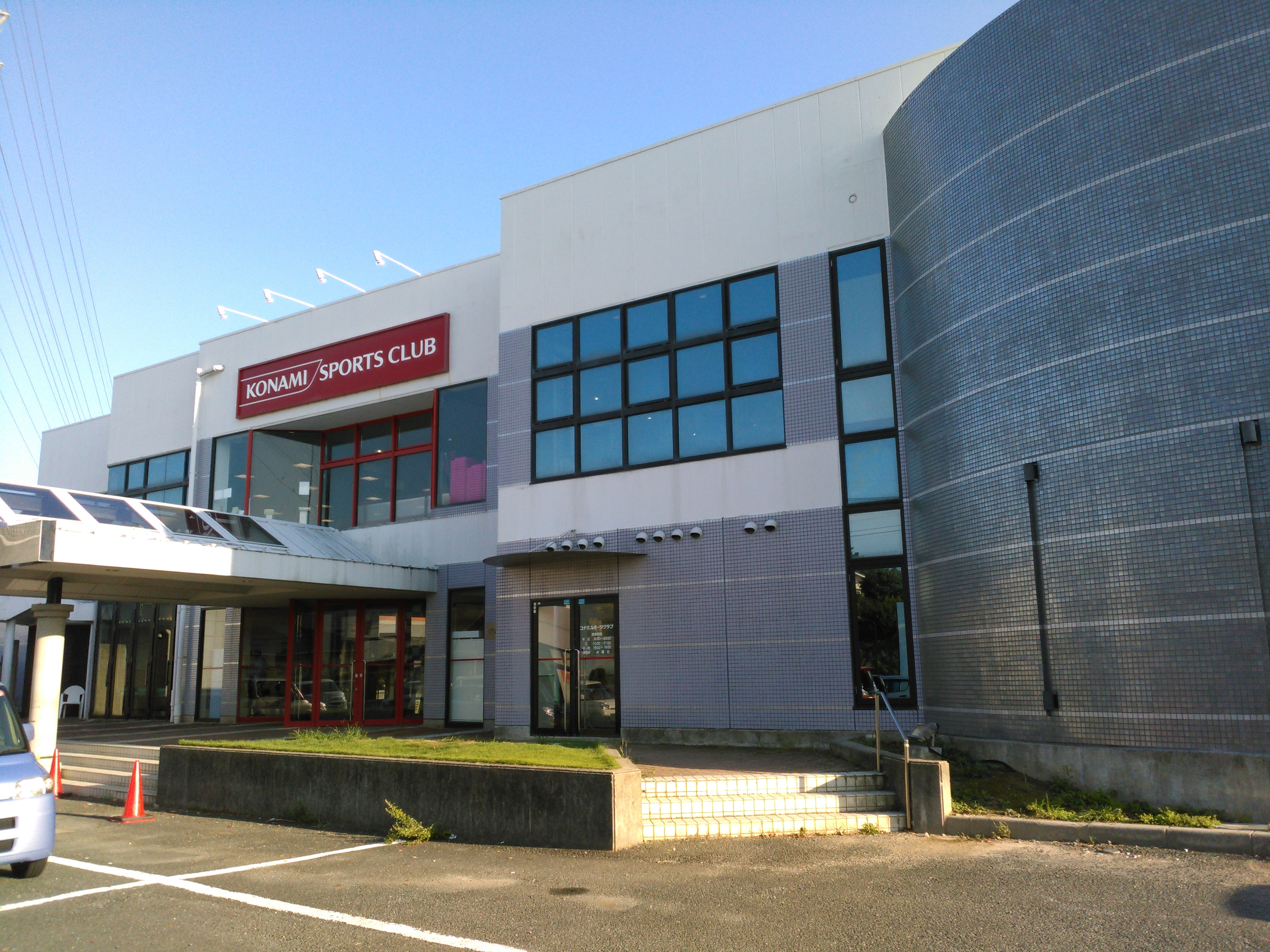
Konami Sports Club in Toyohashi. Konami Sports & Life operates fitness clubs across Japan.

- Konami Group Corporation: holding company and HQ.
- Konami Digital Entertainment Co., Ltd.: planning, production, publishing, development, and sales of mobile games, home games, card games, music and video software, and merchandise.
- Konami Arcade Games Co., Ltd.: production, manufacturing, and sales of arcade machines.
- Konami Sports Co., Ltd.
- Konami Amusement Co., Ltd.: production, manufacturing, and sales of pachinko and pachislot machines.
- Konami Gaming Technology Co., Ltd.
- Konami Business Expert Co., Ltd.
- Konami Animation: anime studio of Konami Digital Entertainment Co., Ltd.
- Kōzuki Foundation

=== America ===
- Konami Gaming, Inc. in Paradise, Nevada
- Konami Digital Entertainment, Inc.: former American holding company, formerly Konami of America Inc., Konami Corporation of America. On 13 October 2003, Konami Corporation of Redwood City, California, announced it was expanding its operations to El Segundo, California, under the new name of Konami Digital Entertainment, Inc. The Redwood City operations have since been consolidated to El Segundo in 2007 and moved to Hawthorne, California, in 2021.
- Konami Cross Media NY
- Konami Corporation of America: U.S.-based holding company.

=== Europe ===
- Konami Digital Entertainment B.V.: European regional branch for publishing and distribution of Konami products.

=== Asia-Pacific ===
- Konami Digital Entertainment Ltd. (科樂美數碼娛樂有限公司): established in September 1994 as Konami (Hong Kong) Limited. Korea and Singapore divisions were established in October 2000. In June 2001, the company changed name to Konami Marketing (Asia) Ltd. (科樂美行銷(亞洲)有限公司). In March 2006, the company was renamed Konami Digital Entertainment Limited.
- Konami Australia Pty. Ltd. (established in 1996)

=== Konami Digital Entertainment ===
Konami Digital Entertainment Co., Ltd.
- Native name: 株式会社コナミデジタルエンタテインメント
- Romanized name: Kabushiki-gaisha Konami Dejitaru Entateinmento
- Type: Subsidiary
- Industry: Video games Publishing
- Founded: 31 March 2006; 20 years ago
- Headquarters: Ginza, Chūō, Tokyo, Japan
- Area served: Worldwide
- Key people: Kimihiko Higashio (chairman); Hideki Hayakawa (president)
- Products: List of Konami games
- Revenue: ▲¥243.5 billion (09/2026)
- Operating income: ▲¥106 billion (09/2026)
- Number of employees: 2,244 (09/2026)
- Parent: Konami
- Divisions: Konami Animation
- Subsidiaries: Konami Digital Entertainment, Inc. Konami Cross Media NY; Konami Digital Entertainment B.V. Konami Digital Entertainment Limited
- Website: www.konami.com/games/corporate/en/

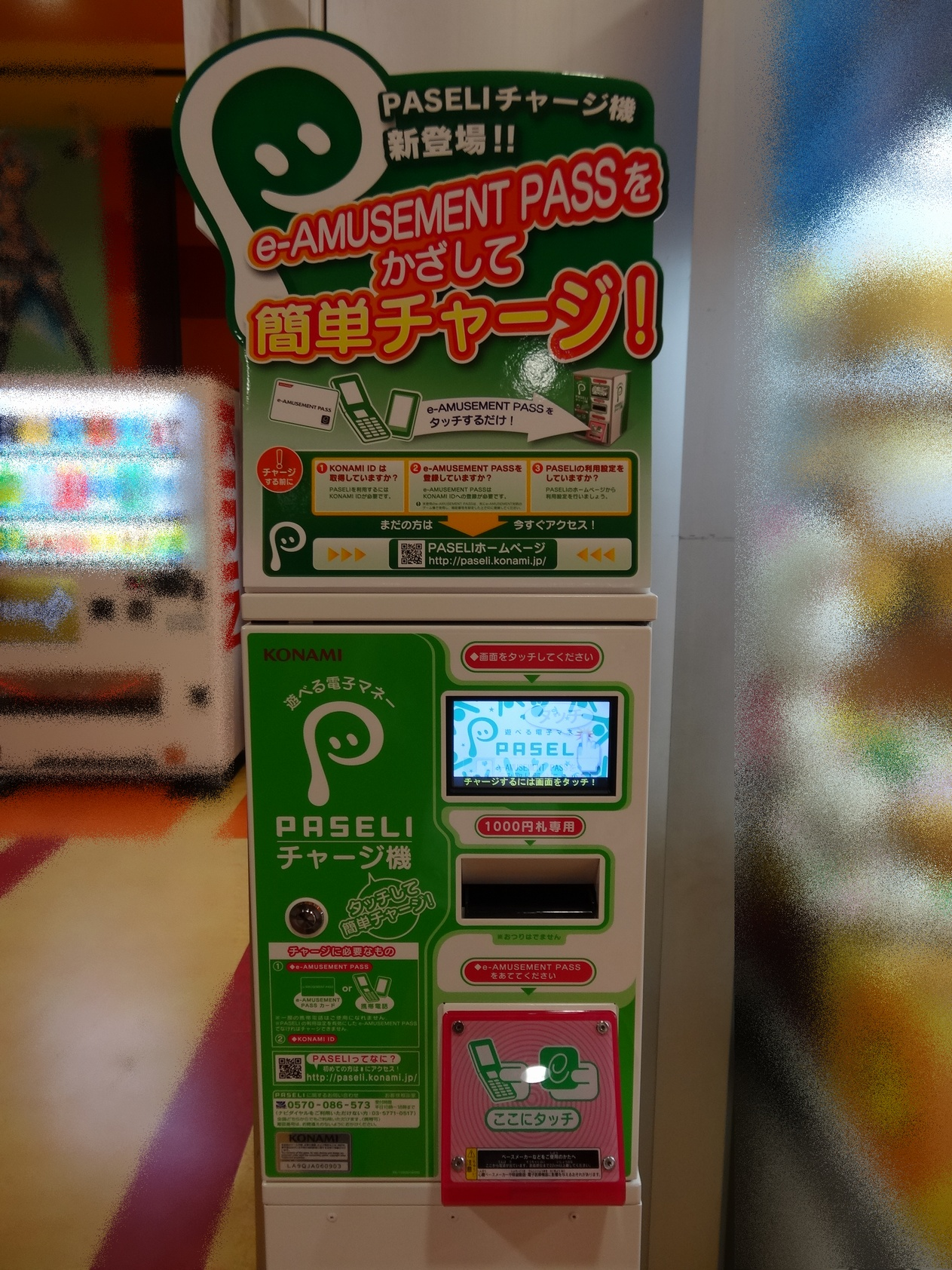
Paseli charger

Konami Digital Entertainment Co., Ltd. (株式会社コナミデジタルエンタテインメント, Kabushiki-gaisha Konami Dejitaru Entateinmento) is Konami's Japanese video game development and publishing subsidiary founded on 31 March 2006. On 7 November 2005, Konami announced its restructuring into a holding company, by moving its Japanese Digital Entertainment Business division. The Digital Entertainment Business became Konami Digital Entertainment Co., Ltd. The newly established Konami Corporation was expected to begin operation on 31 March 2006. Before Konami had formally changed to a holding company in 2006, various forms of Konami Digital Entertainment companies had been established either as holding company or publisher.

==== Subsidiaries ====
- Konami Digital Entertainment, Inc.: North American division, established on 13 October 2003.
- Konami Cross Media NY
- Konami Digital Entertainment B.V.: European division, established on 1 April 2003.
- Konami Digital Entertainment (Asia) Ltd.: Asia-Pacific division. Established in September 1994 as Konami (Hong Kong) Limited. In March 2006, it was renamed to Konami Digital Entertainment Limited.
- Konami Animation: anime studio established in 2023.

=== Former subsidiaries ===
Konami Computer Entertainment Nagoya, Inc. (KCEN), founded on 1 October 1996, was dissolved along with Konami Computer Entertainment Kobe, Inc. (KCEK) in December 2002. On 16 December 2004, Konami Corporation announced Konami Online, Inc., Konami Computer Entertainment Studios, Inc., Konami Computer Entertainment Tokyo, Inc. and Konami Computer Entertainment Japan, Inc. would merge into Konami Corporation, effective on 1 April 2005. On 22 February 2005, Konami Corporation announced Konami Media Entertainment, Inc. would merge into Konami Corporation, effective on 1 March 2005. On 11 March 2005, Konami Corporation announced Konami Traumer, Inc would be merged back into Konami Corporation, effective on 1 June 2005.

On 5 January 2006, Konami announced the merger of Konami Sports Corporation merged with its parent company, Konami Sports Life Corporation. The parent would be dissolved under the merger, and Konami Sports would become the wholly owned subsidiary of Konami Corporation after share exchange between KC and KS. After the share exchange, KS would be renamed Konami Sports & Life Co., Ltd. On 28 February 2006, Konami Sports Corporation merged with its parent company, Konami Sports Life Corporation, and became Konami Sports Corporation. On 21 September 2010, Konami Corporation announced it has signed an agreement to acquire with Abilit Corporation via share exchange. After the transaction, Abilit Corporation became a wholly owned subsidiary of Konami Corporation, effective 1 January 2011. On 1 January 2011, Abilit Corporation was renamed to Takasago Electric Industry Co., Ltd. As part of the acquisition, Biz Share Corporation also became a subsidiary of Konami Corporation.

==== Megacyber Corporation ====
On 2 October 2006, Konami Corporation announced it had completed the acquisition of mobile phone content developer Megacyber Corporation. On 6 February 2007, Konami Corporation announced Megacyber Corporation to be merged into Konami Digital Entertainment Co., Ltd., with Konami Digital Entertainment Co., Ltd. being the surviving company, effective on 1 April 2007.

==== Hudson Soft ====
On 1 April 2011, Konami acquired video game developer Hudson Soft, a company in which Konami had held a controlling stake since 11 April 2005. On 1 March 2012, Hudson Soft merged with Konami Digital Entertainment, with the latter emerging as the surviving entity.

== Video games ==
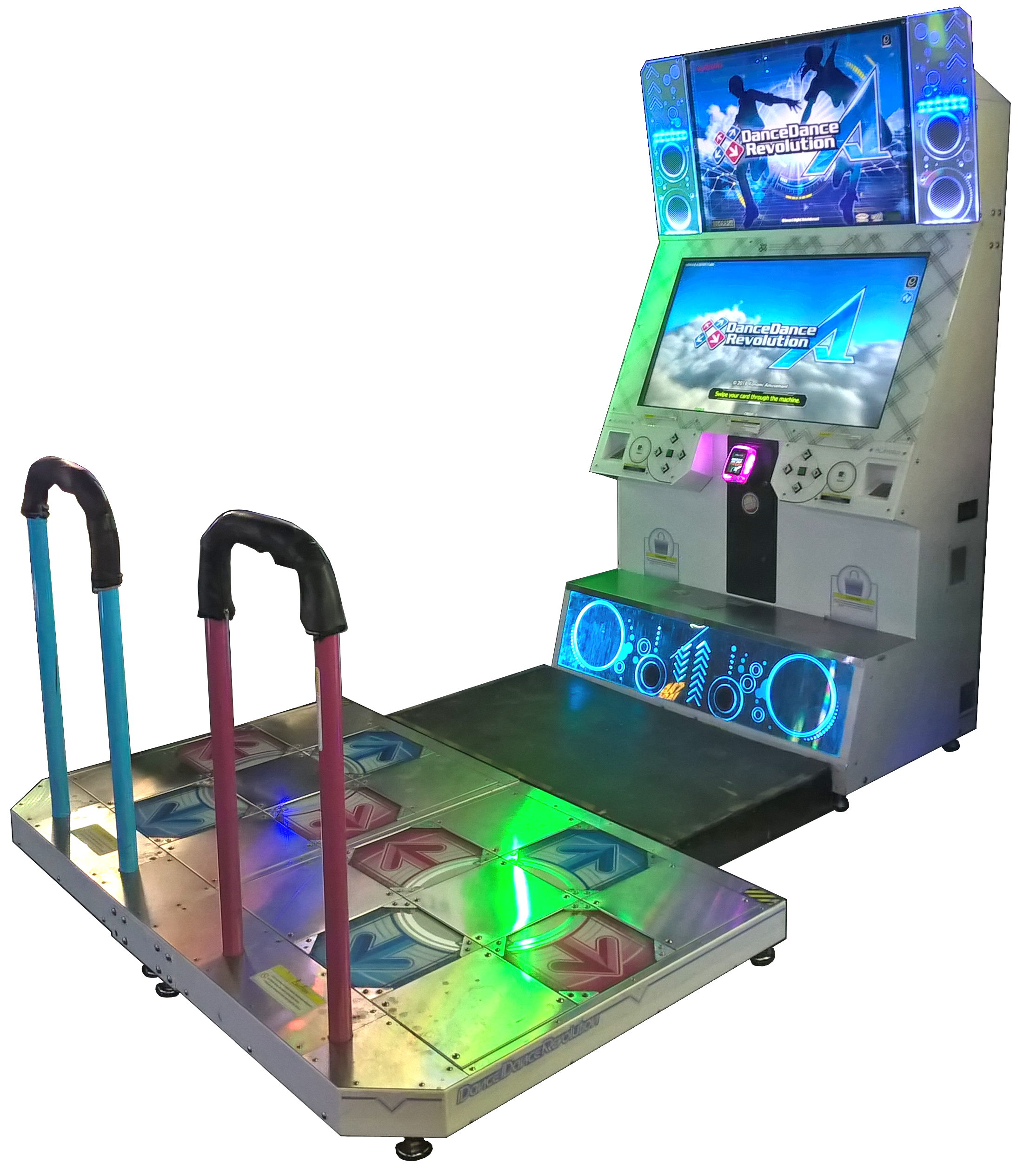
A Dance Dance Revolution arcade machine

Major franchises and titles by Konami include the action Castlevania series, the stealth action Metal Gear series, the survival horror Silent Hill series, the arcade hit Frogger, the action shooter Contra series, the platform adventure Ganbare Goemon series, the role-playing Suikoden series, the Bemani rhythm game series (which includes Dance Dance Revolution, Beatmania IIDX, Gitadora, and Pop'n Music, among others), Dancing with the Stars, the dating simulation Tokimeki Memorial series, and football simulation Pro Evolution Soccer franchise.

Konami has produced shoot 'em up arcade games such as Gradius, Life Force, Time Pilot, Gyruss, Parodius, Axelay, and TwinBee. Konami also licenses games based on cartoons, especially Batman: The Animated Series, Teenage Mutant Ninja Turtles, Tiny Toon Adventures, and the Animaniacs series, but other American productions like The Simpsons, Bucky O'Hare, G.I. Joe, X-Men, and The Goonies, and French comic Asterix all have seen release at some point in the past by Konami on arcades or video game consoles.

Some cinematically styled franchises from Konami are Silent Hill survival horror franchise, and the Metal Gear series. Another successful franchise is Winning Eleven, the spiritual sequel to International Superstar Soccer. In Japan, it is known for the popular Jikkyō Powerful Pro Yakyū series baseball series and the Zone of the Enders games. The company had obtained the rights to Saw from Brash Entertainment when the game's production had been suspended due to financial issues.

Konami is known for its cheat code, which traditionally gives many power-ups in its games. In 2024, FIFA announced Konami as its new official esports partner. This collaboration allows FIFA to host the FIFAe World Cup using Konami's eFootball instead of EA Sports FC. Players can now participate in qualifying matches for two tournaments scheduled for 2024: one for mobile and one for consoles. This partnership aims to enhance eFootball's visibility and attract new players, particularly those who were deterred by previous issues with the game.

== Film production ==
In 2006, various films based on video game franchises began being produced by Konami. Konami produced the Silent Hill film (released in 2006) and announced that it would produce a Metal Gear Solid film. On 4 December 2020, Deadline reported that Oscar Isaac would star as Solid Snake in the adaptation in development at Sony Pictures, with Jordan Vogt-Roberts on board to direct. In April 2026, Zach Lipovsky and Adam Stein hired as directors on the film, following them signing a first-look deal with Sony Pictures and South Korean entertainment giant CJ ENM signed a strategic partnership deal.

== Personal computing ==
In 2020, Konami launched a PC gaming brand in Japan known as Arespear, which includes desktop computers, keyboards, and headsets (the last of which designed in collaboration with Konami's Bemani musicians). The computers have been used in newer Bemani arcade cabinets as a showcase for their capabilities.

== Controversies ==
=== Kojima Productions ===
On 3 March 2015, Konami announced it would be shifting focus away from individual studios, notably Kojima Productions. Internal sources claimed the restructure was due to a clash between Hideo Kojima and Konami. References to Kojima were soon stripped from marketing material, and Kojima's position as an executive vice president of Konami Digital Entertainment was removed from the company's official listing of executives.

Later that year, Konami's legal department barred Kojima from accepting the award for Best Action-Adventure for his work on Metal Gear Solid V: The Phantom Pain at The Game Awards 2015. When announced during the event, the audience booed in disapproval of Konami's actions. Host Geoff Keighley expressed his disappointment in Konami's actions. After actor Kiefer Sutherland accepted the award in Kojima's stead, a choir sang "Quiet's Theme" from The Phantom Pain as a tribute to the absent Kojima. Kojima left Konami several days afterwards, re-opening Kojima Productions as an independent studio to produce Death Stranding.

=== Silent Hills and reduced video game development ===
Silent Hills, set to be the ninth installment of the Silent Hill video game series, was abruptly cancelled in April 2015 without explanation despite the critical acclaim and success of P.T., a playable teaser. Hours after the announcement, Konami delisted itself from the New York Stock Exchange. Game co-director and writer Guillermo del Toro publicly criticized the cancellation as not making any sense and questioned what he described as a "scorched earth" approach to removing the trailer. Due to the experience, del Toro stated that he would never work on another video game.

In 2015, Konami Digital Entertainment CEO Hideki Hayakawa announced that, with few exceptions, Konami would stop making console games and instead focus on the mobile gaming platform. The decision was heavily criticized by the video gaming community. Konami UK community manager Graham Day soon after pushed back against the reporting that Konami would cease AAA game production, stating that he believed the root of the problem to be either a mistranslation or a misinterpretation of Hayakawa's remarks.

=== Treatment of employees and ex-employees ===
In August 2015, The Nikkei criticized Konami for its unethical treatment of employees. In June 2017, The Nikkei further reported on Konami's continued clashes with Kojima Productions, preventing the studio's application for health insurance, as well as Konami's actions in making it difficult for former employees to get future jobs; they are notably forbidden from mentioning their work with Konami on their résumés. Konami also started filing complaints against other game companies that hired ex-Konami employees, leading to an unspecified major game company warning its staff against doing so. A former employee of Konami stated: "If an ex-[Konami employee] is interviewed by the media, the company will send that person a letter through a legal representative, in some cases indicating that Konami is willing to take them to court"; it also pressured an ex-employee into closing their new business.

== See also ==
- Ultra Games, an American shell corporation and publishing label formed by Konami
- Treasure, another independent video game company founded by former Konami employees
- Good-Feel, an independent video game company founded by former Konami employees
- Kojima Productions, an independent studio from Hideo Kojima with the same name of the previous Konami production team

== Sources ==
- Konami Annual Report: 2002, 2003, 2004, 2005, 2006, 2007, 2008. Contains summarized history of the company
- Konami Group History
