= 2019 AFC U-20 Futsal Championship qualification =

Tournament details
- Host countries: Thailand (ASEAN); Uzbekistan (Central); Mongolia (East); United Arab Emirates (West)
- Dates: 1–9 December 2018
- Teams: 23 (from 1 confederation)

Tournament statistics
- Matches played: 30
- Goals scored: 204 (6.8 per match)
- Attendance: 7,226 (241 per match)
- Top scorer: (Saudi Arabia) Khalil Marran (6 goals)

The 2019 AFC U-20 Futsal Championship qualification is the qualification process organized by the Asian Football Confederation (AFC) to determine the participating teams for the 2019 AFC U-20 Futsal Championship. Players born after 1 January 1999 were eligible to compete in the tournament.

A total of 12 teams qualify to play in the final tournament.

== Draw ==
Of the 47 AFC member associations, a total of 23 teams entered the competition. The qualification process is divided into four zones: ASEAN Zone, Central Zone, East Zone and West Zone (no teams from South Zone entered qualification). The 12 spots in the final tournament are distributed as follows:

- Hosts: 1 spot
- ASEAN Zone: 3 spots
- Central Zone: 3 spots
- East Zone: 2 spots
- West Zone: 3 spots

As the final tournament hosts had not been announced at the time of the qualifying draw, the hosts were also included in the draw. Despite having automatically qualified for the final tournament, they may still decide to participate in qualification, and if they finish in one of the qualification spots, the next best team in their zone also qualifies.

The draw for the qualifiers was held on 30 August 2018, 15:00 MYT (UTC+8), at the AFC House in Kuala Lumpur, Malaysia. The mechanism of the draw for each zone is as follows:

- ASEAN Zone: Five teams entered the competition, and they were placed into one group, so no draw was necessary. The top three teams qualify for the final tournament.
- Central Zone: Initially five teams entered the competition, and they were placed into one group, so no draw was necessary. However, after Uzbekistan were added, a re-draw for the Central Zone was held on 18 September 2018 at the AFC House in Kuala Lumpur, Malaysia. The six teams were drawn into two groups of three. The winners of each group, and the winners of the play-off between the runners-up, qualify for the final tournament.
- East Zone: Six teams entered the competition, and they were drawn into two groups of three. The winners of each group qualify for the final tournament.
- West Zone: Six teams entered the competition, and they were drawn into two groups of three. The winners of each group, and the winners of the play-off between the runners-up, qualify for the final tournament.

The teams were seeded according to their performance in the 2017 AFC U-20 Futsal Championship final tournament.

Zone	Pot 1	Pot 2	Pot 3
ASEAN Zone	1. **Thailand** **(H)**; 2. **Indonesia**; 3. **Vietnam**; 4. Malaysia; 5. Myanmar		
Central Zone	1. **Iran**; 2. Uzbekistan **(H)**	3. **Afghanistan**; 4. **Tajikistan**	5. **Kyrgyzstan**; 6. Turkmenistan
East Zone	1. **Japan**; 2. Mongolia **(H)**	3. **Hong Kong**; 4. China	5. **Chinese Taipei**; 6. Macau
West Zone	1. **Iraq**; 2. **Lebanon**	3. United Arab Emirates **(H)**; 4. Saudi Arabia	5. Kuwait; 6. Syria (replaced by Bahrain after the draw)

Notes

- Teams in **bold** qualified for the final tournament. Saudi Arabia, which originally qualified, withdrew and were replaced by Hong Kong.
- (H): Qualification hosts

== Format ==
In each group, teams play each other once at a centralised venue.

=== Tiebreakers ===
Teams are ranked according to points (3 points for a win, 1 point for a draw, 0 points for a loss), and if tied on points, the following tiebreaking criteria are applied, in the order given, to determine the rankings (Regulations Article 11.5):

1. Points in head-to-head matches among tied teams;
2. Goal difference in head-to-head matches among tied teams;
3. Goals scored in head-to-head matches among tied teams;
4. If more than two teams are tied, and after applying all head-to-head criteria above, a subset of teams are still tied, all head-to-head criteria above are reapplied exclusively to this subset of teams;
5. Goal difference in all group matches;
6. Goals scored in all group matches;
7. Penalty shoot-out if only two teams are tied and they met in the last round of the group;
8. Disciplinary points (yellow card = 1 point, red card as a result of two yellow cards = 3 points, direct red card = 3 points, yellow card followed by direct red card = 4 points);
9. Drawing of lots.

== ASEAN Zone ==
- The ASEAN Zone qualifiers are played between 5–9 December 2018.
- All matches are held in Thailand.
- Times listed are UTC+7.

Schedule
Matchday	Dates	Matches
Matchday 1	5 December 2018	3 v 2, 5 v 4
Matchday 2	6 December 2018	4 v 1, 5 v 3
Matchday 3	7 December 2018	1 v 5, 2 v 4
Matchday 4	8 December 2018	2 v 5, 3 v 1
Matchday 5	9 December 2018	4 v 3, 1 v 2

Pos	Team	Pld	W	D	L	GF	GA	GD	Pts	Qualification
1	Thailand (H)	4	3	1	0	16	6	+10	10	Final tournament
2	Vietnam	4	2	2	0	8	6	+2	8	Final tournament
3	Indonesia	4	2	1	1	18	9	+9	7	Final tournament
4	Malaysia	4	1	0	3	6	10	−4	3	
5	Myanmar	4	0	0	4	2	19	−17	0	

Source: AFC
Rules for classification: Qualification tiebreakers
(H) Hosts
5 December 2018
14:00

Vietnam	3–3	Indonesia
Đào Minh Quang 11'; Nguyễn Huỳnh Thanh Huy 14'; Huỳnh Mi Woen 26'	Report	Xavier 1'; Sanjaya 20'; Syaifullah 25'

Indoor Stadium Huamark, Bangkok
Attendance: 358
Referee: Nurdin Bukuev (Kyrgyzstan)
5 December 2018
16:15

Myanmar	0–1	Malaysia
	Report	Ekmal 30'

Indoor Stadium Huamark, Bangkok
Attendance: 300
Referee: Anatoliy Rubakov (Uzbekistan)

6 December 2018
14:00

Malaysia	2–4	Thailand
Ekmal 10'; Zakry 23'	Report	Somchai 2'; Nattasak 22'; Thawatchai 24'; Supakorn 30'

Indoor Stadium Huamark, Bangkok
Attendance: 500
Referee: Abdallah Ghaith (Lebanon)
6 December 2018
16:15

Myanmar	1–2	Vietnam
Luaw Zar Yar Lwin 8'	Report	Nguyễn Huỳnh Thanh Huy 8'; Châu Đoàn Phát 14'

Indoor Stadium Huamark, Bangkok
Attendance: 56
Referee: Liu Jianqiao (China)

7 December 2018
14:00

Thailand	7–1	Myanmar
Supakorn 6'; Pyae Phyo Maung 9' (o.g.); Piyapan 15', 24'; Krit 20'; Chutipong 27'; Chutinan 38'	Report	Htet Wai Thein 22'

Indoor Stadium Huamark, Bangkok
Attendance: 158
Referee: Takeshi Fujita (Japan)
7 December 2018
16:15

Indonesia	4–2	Malaysia
Amanda 16'; Afif 19'; Rizal 20'; Syaifullah 35'	Report	Harith 2'; Iskandar 40' (pen.)

Indoor Stadium Huamark, Bangkok
Attendance: 100
Referee: Kim Jong-hee (South Korea)

8 December 2018
14:00

Indonesia	9–0	Myanmar
Syaifullah 3'; Rizal 9', 18'; Firman 11'; Zidani 17'; Sanjaya 19', 35'; Amanda 20'; Afif 29'	Report

Indoor Stadium Huamark, Bangkok
Attendance: 150
Referee: Nurdin Bukuev (Kyrgyzstan)
8 December 2018
16:15

Vietnam	1–1	Thailand
Huỳnh Mi Woen 13'	Report	Nattasak 28'

Indoor Stadium Huamark, Bangkok
Attendance: 1,150
Referee: Liu Jianqiao (China)

9 December 2018
14:00

Malaysia	1–2	Vietnam
Harith 23'	Report	Nhan Gia Hưng 3'; Huỳnh Mi Woen 40'

Indoor Stadium Huamark, Bangkok
Attendance: 250
Referee: Anatoliy Rubakov (Uzbekistan)
9 December 2018
16:15

Thailand	4–2	Indonesia
Chutinan 2'; Xavier 4' (o.g.); Syaifullah 14' (o.g.); Charoondej 18'	Report	Sanjaya 14'; Syaifullah 22'

Indoor Stadium Huamark, Bangkok
Attendance: 1,200
Referee: Nurdin Bukuev (Kyrgyzstan)

== Central Zone ==
- The Central Zone qualifiers are played between 1–4 December 2018.
- All matches are held in Uzbekistan.
- Times listed are UTC+5.

Schedule
Matchday	Dates	Matches
Matchday 1	1 December 2018	3 v 1
Matchday 2	2 December 2018	2 v 3
Matchday 3	3 December 2018	1 v 2
Play-off	4 December 2018	A2 v B2

=== Group A ===
Pos	Team	Pld	W	D	L	GF	GA	GD	Pts	Qualification
1	Iran	2	2	0	0	10	5	+5	6	Final tournament
2	Afghanistan	2	1	0	1	7	4	+3	3	Play-off
3	Turkmenistan	2	0	0	2	3	11	−8	0	

Source: AFC
Rules for classification: Qualification tiebreakers
1 December 2018
13:00

Turkmenistan	3–6	Iran
Hosseinzadeh 4' (o.g.); Kuliyev 20'; Panchenko 30'	Report	Aghapour 4'; Adelipour 10'; Yousef 18'; Ghanbari 30'; Esmaeili 34', 38'

Uzbekistan Stadium, Tashkent
Attendance: 100
Referee: Husain Ali Al-Bahhar (Bahrain)

2 December 2018
16:00

Afghanistan	5–0	Turkmenistan
H. Jafari 4'; Mahmoodi 6'; Sapargulyyev 21' (o.g.); Yousufi 33'; Hoshmyradov 38' (o.g.)	Report

Uzbekistan Stadium, Tashkent
Attendance: 100
Referee: Mohamad Chami (Lebanon)

3 December 2018
13:00

Iran	4–2	Afghanistan
Ahmadi 7', 15'; Aghapour 14'; Safari 29' (o.g.)	Report	Hossaini 7'; Mousavi 26'

Uzbekistan Stadium, Tashkent
Attendance: 100
Referee: Osama Saeed Idrees Sedaif (Bahrain)

=== Group B ===
Pos	Team	Pld	W	D	L	GF	GA	GD	Pts	Qualification
1	Kyrgyzstan	2	1	0	1	9	7	+2	3	Final tournament
2	Tajikistan	2	1	0	1	8	8	0	3	Play-off
3	Uzbekistan (H)	2	1	0	1	8	10	−2	3	

Source: AFC
Rules for classification: Qualification tiebreakers
(H) Hosts
1 December 2018
16:00

Kyrgyzstan	3–6	Uzbekistan
D. Uulu 9', 36'; Zholdubaev 14'	Report	Mukhammadiev 7', 34'; Sadiev 13'; Solikhov 25'; Zoirov 38', 40'

Uzbekistan Stadium, Tashkent
Attendance: 200
Referee: Fahad Al-Hosani (United Arab Emirates)

2 December 2018
13:00

Tajikistan	1–6	Kyrgyzstan
Saburov 21'	Report	Zholdoshov 2'; Zholdubaev 6', 10'; D. Uulu 17'; Dolotkeldiev 19'; Isakov 24'

Uzbekistan Stadium, Tashkent
Attendance: 100
Referee: Hasan Mousa Al-Gburi (Iraq)

3 December 2018
16:00

Uzbekistan	2–7	Tajikistan
Zoirov 2'; Sadiev 21'	Report	Rajabov 3', 7', 13'; Yorov 35', 40'; Nematov 37'; Saburov 39'

Uzbekistan Stadium, Tashkent
Attendance: 200
Referee: Hawkar Salar Ahmed (Iraq)

=== Play-off ===
Winner qualifies for 2019 AFC U-20 Futsal Championship.

4 December 2018
13:00

Afghanistan	4–1	Tajikistan
Mousavi 12', 16'; Mahmoodi 29'; Hossaini 35'	Report	Rabiev 35'

Uzbekistan Stadium, Tashkent
Attendance: 100
Referee: Husain Ali Al-Bahhar (Bahrain)

As Iran were confirmed as the final tournament hosts on 5 December 2018, loser also qualifies for 2019 AFC U-20 Futsal Championship.

== East Zone ==
- The East Zone qualifiers are played between 1–3 December 2018.
- All matches are held in Mongolia.
- Times listed are UTC+8.

Schedule
Matchday	Dates	Matches
Matchday 1	1 December 2018	3 v 1
Matchday 2	2 December 2018	2 v 3
Matchday 3	3 December 2018	1 v 2

=== Group A ===
Pos	Team	Pld	W	D	L	GF	GA	GD	Pts	Qualification
1	Japan	2	2	0	0	22	2	+20	6	Final tournament
2	Hong Kong	2	1	0	1	7	4	+3	3	Final tournament as replacement (Note: Hong Kong qualified as the East Zone best runners-up after Saudi Arabia (West Zone play-off winners) withdrew.)
3	Macau	2	0	0	2	0	23	−23	0	

Source: AFC
Rules for classification: Qualification tiebreakers
Notes:
1 December 2018
13:00

Macau	0–18	Japan
	Report	Motoishi 3', 5', 5', 33'; Osawa 3', 7', 37'; J. Yamada 4', 18', 27'; K. Yamada 6', 30'; Hashimoto 19'; Takahashi 25'; Mori 26'; Otsuka 28', 29', 29'

Buyant Ukhaa Sport Palace, Ulaanbaatar
Attendance: 83
Referee: Trương Quốc Dũng (Vietnam)

2 December 2018
16:00

Hong Kong	5–0	Macau
Chu Wing Cho 3', 20'; Lee Ho Yin 28'; Wong Wai Kwok 33'; Chang Hiu Nam 38'	Report

Buyant Ukhaa Sport Palace, Ulaanbaatar
Attendance: 75
Referee: Ridzuan Rozali (Malaysia)

3 December 2018
13:00

Japan	4–2	Hong Kong
Otsuka 7', 27'; J. Yamada 20', 39'	Report	Chow Ka Lok Leo 21'; Yuen Sai Kit 26'

Buyant Ukhaa Sport Palace, Ulaanbaatar
Attendance: 90
Referee: Ali Hafizi (Iran)

=== Group B ===
Pos	Team	Pld	W	D	L	GF	GA	GD	Pts	Qualification
1	Chinese Taipei	2	2	0	0	10	4	+6	6	Final tournament
2	Mongolia (H)	2	1	0	1	5	4	+1	3	
3	China	2	0	0	2	4	11	−7	0	

Source: AFC
Rules for classification: Qualification tiebreakers
(H) Hosts
1 December 2018
16:00

Chinese Taipei	3–1	Mongolia
Tai Wei-jen 3', 13'; Chen Ching-hang 32'	Report	Battogtokh 34'

Buyant Ukhaa Sport Palace, Ulaanbaatar
Attendance: 500
Referee: Mahmoudreza Nasirloo (Iran)

2 December 2018
13:00

China	3–7	Chinese Taipei
Xu Maoxi 14'; Zhong Liguo 21', 31'	Report	Huang Chih-kai 19'; Hsieh Chin-cheng 32'; Tai Wei-jen 33'; Wang Kun-wei 36'; Liu Ju-ming 36'; Chen Ching-hang 40'; Chang Che-ming 40'

Buyant Ukhaa Sport Palace, Ulaanbaatar
Attendance: 50
Referee: Ali Hafizi (Iran)

3 December 2018
16:00

Mongolia	4–1	China
Tumurbaatar 17'; Erdenebat 29', 40'; Purevkhuu 30'	Report	Liu Changsheng 7'

Buyant Ukhaa Sport Palace, Ulaanbaatar
Attendance: 206
Referee: Azat Hajypolatov (Turkmenistan)

== West Zone ==
- The West Zone qualifiers are played between 6–9 December 2018.
- All matches are held in United Arab Emirates.
- Times listed are UTC+4.

Schedule
Matchday	Dates	Matches
Matchday 1	6 December 2018	3 v 1
Matchday 2	7 December 2018	2 v 3
Matchday 3	8 December 2018	1 v 2
Play-off	9 December 2018	A2 v B2

=== Group A ===
Pos	Team	Pld	W	D	L	GF	GA	GD	Pts	Qualification
1	Lebanon	2	2	0	0	15	4	+11	6	Final tournament
2	Saudi Arabia	2	1	0	1	6	9	−3	3	Play-off
3	Kuwait	2	0	0	2	3	11	−8	0	

Source: AFC
Rules for classification: Qualification tiebreakers
6 December 2018
18:00

Kuwait	2–7	Lebanon
Al-Ateeqi 32'; Shehab 40' (o.g.)	Report	Hamieh 12'; Selwan 17', 30', 31'; Hamouch 27'; Harfouche 29'; El Khoury 39'

Fujairah Club Stadium, Fujairah
Attendance: 150
Referee: An Ran (China)

7 December 2018
15:30

Saudi Arabia	4–1	Kuwait
Marran 2', 27'; Muharraq 24'; Al-Dossari 39'	Report	Al-Sahli 33'

Fujairah Club Stadium, Fujairah
Attendance: 100
Referee: Darius Turner (Australia)

8 December 2018
15:30

Lebanon	8–2	Saudi Arabia
Selwan 4', 16'; Hamouch 15'; Elkaiss 24'; Koukezian 24'; Hamieh 28'; Shehab 36'; El Khoury 38'	Report	Al-Dossari 22'; Al-Harbi 33'

Fujairah Club Stadium, Fujairah
Attendance: 150
Referee: Ebrahim Mehrabi Afshar (Iran)

=== Group B ===
Pos	Team	Pld	W	D	L	GF	GA	GD	Pts	Qualification
1	Iraq	2	2	0	0	12	1	+11	6	Final tournament
2	Bahrain	2	1	0	1	5	7	−2	3	Play-off
3	United Arab Emirates (H)	2	0	0	2	2	11	−9	0	

Source: AFC
Rules for classification: Qualification tiebreakers
(H) Hosts
6 December 2018
15:30

Bahrain	1–5	Iraq
Adnan 18' (pen.)	Report	Lami 2'; Abdulhakeem 4'; Al-Rubaye 16'; Hussein 25', 34'

Fujairah Club Stadium, Fujairah
Attendance: 100
Referee: Ryan Shepheard (Australia)

7 December 2018
18:00

United Arab Emirates	2–4	Bahrain
Hasan 9'; Al-Shehhi 39'	Report	Adnan 27', 28'; Ahmed 32'; Zakareya 38'

Fujairah Club Stadium, Fujairah
Attendance: 350
Referee: Vahid Arzpeyma Mohammreh (Iran)

8 December 2018
18:00

Iraq	7–0	United Arab Emirates
Lami 2'; Basim 4'; Zamil 6'; Raad 9'; Abdulhakeem 21', 22'; Chasib 27'	Report

Fujairah Club Stadium, Fujairah
Attendance: 150
Referee: Yuttakon Maiket (Thailand)

=== Play-off ===
Winner qualifies for 2019 AFC U-20 Futsal Championship.

9 December 2018
18:00

Saudi Arabia	10–3	Bahrain
Marran 1', 16', 29', 37'; Al Qasim 8', 13', 24'; Al-Harbi 9'; Al-Dossari 20'; Al-Obid 23'	Report	Zakareya 22'; Jaafar 23'; Marran 36' (o.g.)

Fujairah Club Stadium, Fujairah
Attendance: 100
Referee: Ebrahim Mehrabi Afshar (Iran)

Saudi Arabia later withdrew and were replaced by Hong Kong.

== Qualified teams ==
The following 12 teams qualified for the final tournament. Saudi Arabia, which originally qualified, withdrew and were replaced by Hong Kong.

Team	Qualified as	Qualified on	Previous appearances in AFC U-20 Futsal Championship^{1}
Thailand	ASEAN Zone winners	7 December 2018	1 (2017)
Vietnam	ASEAN Zone runners-up	9 December 2018	1 (2017)
Indonesia	ASEAN Zone third place	8 December 2018	1 (2017)
Iran	Central Zone Group A winners and Hosts	3 December 2018	1 (**2017**)
Kyrgyzstan	Central Zone Group B winners	3 December 2018	1 (2017)
Afghanistan	Central Zone play-off winners	4 December 2018	1 (2017)
Tajikistan	Central Zone play-off losers	5 December 2018	1 (2017)
Japan	East Zone Group A winners	3 December 2018	1 (2017)
Chinese Taipei	East Zone Group B winners	2 December 2018	1 (2017)
Hong Kong	East Zone best runners-up	10 April 2019	1 (2017)
Lebanon	West Zone Group A winners	8 December 2018	1 (2017)
Iraq	West Zone Group B winners	8 December 2018	1 (2017)

^{1} Bold indicates champions for that year. Italic indicates hosts for that year.

== Goalscorers ==
There were 204 goals scored in 30 matches, for an average of 6.8 goals per match.

6 goals

- (Saudi Arabia) Khalil Marran

5 goals

- (Japan) Hiroto Otsuka
- (Japan) Jiei Yamada
- (Lebanon) Jamal Selwan

4 goals

- (Indonesia) Muhammad Sanjaya
- (Indonesia) Muhammad Syaifullah
- (Japan) Takehiro Motoishi

3 goals

- (Afghanistan) Seyed Mousavi
- (Bahrain) Sayed Adnan
- (Chinese Taipei) Tai Wei-jen
- (Indonesia) Rizal Musthofa
- (Iraq) Hussein Abdulhakeem
- (Japan) Masashi Osawa
- (Kyrgyzstan) Denisbek Amandyk Uulu
- (Kyrgyzstan) Mirlan Zholdubaev
- (Saudi Arabia) Abdullah Al-Dossari
- (Saudi Arabia) Fahad Al Qasim
- (Tajikistan) Muhamamd Rajabov
- (Uzbekistan) Mukhammad Zoirov
- (Vietnam) Huỳnh Mi Woen

2 goals

- (Afghanistan) Hamid Reza Hossaini
- (Afghanistan) Farzad Mahmoodi
- (Bahrain) Komail Zakareya
- (China) Zhong Liguo
- (Chinese Taipei) Chen Ching-hang
- (Hong Kong) Chu Wing Cho
- (Indonesia) Dewa Rizki Amanda
- (Indonesia) Afif Rizky
- (Iran) Salar Aghapour
- (Iran) Seyed Behdad Ahmadi
- (Iran) Belal Esmaeili
- (Iraq) Ali Abdullah Lami
- (Iraq) Yaseen Hussein
- (Japan) Kaito Yamada
- (Lebanon) Georgio El Khoury
- (Lebanon) Hussein Hamieh
- (Lebanon) Majd Hamouch
- (Malaysia) Harith Naim
- (Malaysia) Ekmal Shahrin
- (Mongolia) Bat-Orgil Erdenebat
- (Saudi Arabia) Alwaleed Al-Harbi
- (Tajikistan) Khalid Saburov
- (Tajikistan) Idris Yorov
- (Thailand) Piyapan Aeimwilai
- (Thailand) Nattasak Photi
- (Thailand) Chutinan Raksasap
- (Thailand) Supakorn Sangom
- (Uzbekistan) Asli Mukhammadiev
- (Uzbekistan) Shakhzodjon Sadiev
- (Vietnam) Nguyễn Huỳnh Thanh Huy

1 goal

- (Afghanistan) Hassan Ali Jafari
- (Afghanistan) Dawood Yousufi
- (Bahrain) Saleh Ahmed
- (Bahrain) Hasan Jaafar
- (China) Liu Changsheng
- (China) Xu Maoxi
- (Chinese Taipei) Chang Che-ming
- (Chinese Taipei) Huang Chih-kai
- (Chinese Taipei) Hsieh Chin-cheng
- (Chinese Taipei) Liu Ju-ming
- (Chinese Taipei) Wang Kun-wei
- (Hong Kong) Yuen Sai Kit
- (Hong Kong) Wong Wai Kwok
- (Hong Kong) Chow Ka Lok Leo
- (Hong Kong) Chang Hiu Nam
- (Hong Kong) Lee Ho Yin
- (Indonesia) Firman Adriansyah
- (Indonesia) Rizki Xavier
- (Indonesia) Ramadhan Zidani
- (Iran) Sajjad Adelipour
- (Iran) Reza Ghanbari
- (Iran) Masoud Yousef
- (Iraq) Hussein Al-Rubaye
- (Iraq) Sadeq Basim
- (Iraq) Basheer Chasib
- (Iraq) Hayder Raad
- (Iraq) Hussein Zamil
- (Japan) Reira Hashimoto
- (Japan) Gensuke Mori
- (Japan) Yudai Takahashi
- (Kuwait) Abdalmahsen Al-Ateeqi
- (Kuwait) Abdullah Al-Sahli
- (Kyrgyzstan) Azamat Dolotkeldiev
- (Kyrgyzstan) Damir Isakov
- (Kyrgyzstan) Mamatziia Zholdoshov
- (Lebanon) Mohamad Elkaiss
- (Lebanon) Nabih Harfouche
- (Lebanon) Steve Koukezian
- (Lebanon) Hassan Shehab
- (Malaysia) Zakry Asraf
- (Malaysia) Iskandar Harun
- (Mongolia) Erdene-Undrakh Battogtokh
- (Mongolia) Bilegjargal Purevkhuu
- (Mongolia) Ankhbayar Tumurbaatar
- (Myanmar) Luaw Zar Yar Lwin
- (Myanmar) Htet Wai Thein
- (Saudi Arabia) Meshari Al-Obid
- (Saudi Arabia) Musab Muharraq
- (Tajikistan) Faridun Nematov
- (Tajikistan) Rabijon Rabiev
- (Thailand) Krit Aransanyalak
- (Thailand) Somchai Aunyongseng
- (Thailand) Charoondej Muenthiang
- (Thailand) Thawatchai Rairat
- (Thailand) Chutipong Suraditanunt
- (Turkmenistan) Daniil Panchenko
- (Turkmenistan) Muhametkuli Kuliyev
- (United Arab Emirates) Humaid Al-Shehhi
- (United Arab Emirates) Mohamed Hasan
- (Uzbekistan) Abdulla Solikhov
- (Vietnam) Châu Đoàn Phát
- (Vietnam) Đào Minh Quang
- (Vietnam) Nhận Gia Hưng

1 own goal

- (Afghanistan) Javad Safari (against Iran)
- (Indonesia) Muhammad Syaifullah (against Thailand)
- (Indonesia) Rizki Xavier (against Thailand)
- (Iran) Erfan Hosseinzadeh (against Turkmenistan)
- (Lebanon) Hassan Shehab (against Kuwait)
- (Myanmar) Pyae Phyo Maung (against Thailand)
- (Saudi Arabia) Khalil Marran (against Bahrain)
- (Turkmenistan) Meylis Hoshmyradov (against Afghanistan)
- (Turkmenistan) Arzuvguly Sapargulyyev (against Afghanistan)
