= Miguel Rodrigo =

Spanish Futsal coach (born 1970)

Personal information
- Full name: Miguel Rodrigo Conde Salazar
- Date of birth: 15 July 1970 (age 56)
- Place of birth: Valencia, Spain
- Height: 1.75 m (5 ft 9 in)

Senior career*
| Years | Team | Apps | (Gls) |
| 1986–1991 | Banco de Granada | | |
| 1991–1992 | Almunecar Perez Casket | | |

Managerial career
- 1992–1998: Banco de Granada
- 1998–1999: Nazareno de Sevilla
- 1999–2000: Jaén Paraíso Interio
- 2000–2003: Petrarca Padova
- 2003–2004: Dinamo Moscow
- 2004: Luparense
- 2004–2009: Caja Segovia
- 2009–2016: Japan
- 2016–2017: Thailand
- 2017–2019: Vietnam
- 2024–2025: Thailand
- * Club domestic league appearances and goals

Miguel Rodrigo (born 15 July 1970) is a Spanish professional futsal coach who was most recently the manager of the Thailand national futsal team.

Miguel Rodrigo had a successful spell between 2009 and 2016 with Japan , which won two titles of the AFC Futsal Championship under his guidance. Due to his depth of tactics and formations, he was dubbed by the Japanese media and fans as The Magician (Japanese: 魔法使 – Mahōtsukai).

== Career ==
=== Japan ===
In June 2009, the Japan Football Association (JFA) appointed Miguel Rodrigo as the national Futsal trainer with a one-year contract. In 2010, Rodrigo guided Japan to the semi-finals of the 2010 AFC Futsal Championship. Japan lost to Iran in the semi but secured the third-place after the win over China in the third-place playoff match. He got the two-year contract extension from JFA after the tournament.

In the 2012 AFC Futsal Championship in United Arab Emirates, Miguel Rodrigo led Japan to their second title of Asian Championship after winning 6–1 over Thailand in the final.

In the 2012 FIFA Futsal World Cup in Thailand, Japan was in Group C along with Brazil, Portugal and Libya in the group stage. Rodrigo guided Japan to the next round by finishing third place in the group with 4 points. Japan later lost 3–6 to Ukraine in the Round of 16. His most notable moment in the tournament was in the group stage when Rodrigo led Japan to draw 5 – 5 against Portugal after being down 2 – 5 in the first half. In February 2013, he got a contract extension to 2016.

In the 2014 AFC Futsal Championship in Vietnam, Rodrigo guided Japan to their third and two-in-a-row Asian championship title after winning the penalty shoot-out over Iran after a 2–2 draw in time.

In the 2016 AFC Futsal Championship in Uzbekistan, Rodrigo failed to lead Japan to the 2016 FIFA Futsal World Cup after the defeat by penalty shoot-out to Vietnam in the Quarterfinals and the loss to Kyrgyzstan in the 5th – 8th place play-off match. Miguel Rodrigo has stepped down from his position after the tournament.

=== Thailand ===
On 1 July 2016, the Football Association of Thailand announced the appointment of Miguel Rodrigo as the national trainer of Thailand with a one-year contract. His official managerial debut for Thailand was on 20 August 2016, the game of the 2016 Thailand Five's against his former side Japan , which ended as a 2–2 draw. He managed to win 7–5 over Asian champion Iran and draw 3–3 against third-place finisher from UEFA Futsal Euro 2016, Kazakhstan, in the other two matches of the tournament.

Miguel Rodrigo led Thailand to the 2016 FIFA Futsal World Cup in Colombia. Thailand was placed in Group B along with Russia, Egypt and Cuba. Thailand played its first match against the third-place place in the World Ranking, Russia and lost by 4–6 with an impressive performance. Rodrigo led Thailand to win the other two games in the group stage against Cuba and Egypt and qualified for round of 16 as the runner-up of Group B behind Russia, who collected 9 points. This is the first time in history that Thailand could collected more than 3 points in the group stage. Rodrigo guided Thailand to the round of 16 and defeated Azerbaijan with an 8–13 result in the extra-time after a 7–7 draw in 40 minutes.

In January 2017, Miguel Rodrigo lead Thailand to the 2016 AFF Futsal Championship, the premier competition of Southeast Asia. Thailand under his coaching managed to collect two wins in the group stage over Timor-Leste and Brunei then advanced to the semi-finals. In the semi-finals against Malaysia, his Thailand was stunted with the 0–3 losing result in the first half. However, Thailand turned it around and won it with the 5–3 result. In the final of the tournament, Thailand comfortably won 8–1 over Myanmar and lifted their twelfth AFF Futsal Championship title. It was also the first trophy of Miguel Rodrigo with Thailand.

=== Thailand Under 20 ===
Starting from February 2017, Miguel Rodrigo also took a charge of Thailand national under-20 futsal team to compete in 2017 AFC U-20 Futsal Championship.

In the group stage of 2017 AFC U-20 Futsal Championship, Thailand was placed as the seed team of Group A. Thai team won first 4 games against Malaysia, Bahrain, Brunei and Afghanistan then lost to Iraq in the last game of the stage. Thailand qualified for the first round of knock-out stage as the runner-up of group A.

At the knock-out round, Miguel Rodrigo lead Thailand to beat Indonesia with 4–2 winning result and advanced to face Iran in semi-finals. Thailand lost 5 – 7 to Iran in the extra-time after a 3–3 draw at the end of 40 minutes. Thailand missed the final and had to face Uzbekistan in the third-place playoff match.

In the third-place placement on 24 May, Thailand U-20 under Miguel Rodrigo won 8–-1 over Uzbekistan under the training of former Thailand's head coach, Pulpis. Thailand claimed the third place in the first edition of 2017 AFC U-20 Futsal Championship.

=== Parting way with Thailand ===
After one year with Thailand, Miguel Rodrigo's contract was running out at the end of July 2017.

On 30 May at the headquarter of Football Association of Thailand, Miguel Rodrigo officially announced that he will not prolong the contract with Football Association of Thailand to open for the offers. He stated the farewell message to the fans and cheered next Thailand's trainer and his Spaniard fellow, Pulpis.

=== Second spell with Thailand ===
On 29 February 2024, Football Association of Thailand announced the appointment of Miguel Rodrigo as the national head coach of Thailand.

==== Departure and retirement ====
On 20 December 2025, Miguel Rodrigo officially announced his departure as head coach of the Thailand national futsal team following the conclusion of his final match at the 2025 Southeast Asian Games (33rd SEA Games). His last match in charge was the men's futsal final, in which Thailand were defeated 1–6 by Indonesia, securing the silver medal.

Rodrigo confirmed that the match marked the end of his professional coaching career, stating that he would no longer manage teams at either club or international level. He cited personal reasons for his decision, primarily his intention to return to Spain to focus on family commitments.

During his two-year tenure with the Thailand national team, Rodrigo led the side to several notable achievements, including a runner-up finish at the AFC Futsal Asian Cup and a ninth-place finish at the FIFA Futsal World Cup. Despite not concluding his tenure with a victory, he expressed pride in the team's development and accomplishments during his time in charge.

Rodrigo expressed his gratitude to the Football Association of Thailand, as well as to the players, coaching staff, and Thai futsal supporters. He concluded his farewell message by stating, "Goodbye, or perhaps better to say, 'see you again.' Thailand, I love you all very much."

== Managerial statistics ==
As of 19 December 2025

Managerial record by team and tenure
| Team | Nat | From | To | Record | | | | |
| Team | Nat | From | To | P | W | D | L | Win % |
|---|---|---|---|---|---|---|---|---|
| Japan | (Japan) | June 2009 | 29 February 2016 | 92 | 46 | 13 | 33 | 50.00 |
| Thailand | (Thailand) | 1 July 2016 | 30 May 2017 | 13 | 8 | 2 | 3 | 61.54 |
| Thailand U-20 | (Thailand) | 1 February 2017 | 30 May 2017 | 9 | 7 | 0 | 2 | 77.78 |
| Vietnam | (Vietnam) | 1 July 2017 | 30 November 2019 | 17 | 9 | 3 | 5 | 52.94 |
| Thailand | (Thailand) | 29 February 2024 | 20 December 2025 | 41 | 28 | 2 | 11 | 68.29 |
| Total | | | | 172 | 98 | 20 | 54 | 56.98 |

^{1} Only official games against other national team.
^{2} A win or loss by the penalty shoot-out is regarded as the draw in time.

== Achievements ==
=== Manager ===
Japan

- AFC Futsal Championship: Champion (2) : 2012, 2014

Thailand

- AFF Futsal Championship: Champion (1) : 2016
- AFC Futsal Asian Cup: (silver) Runner-up: 2024
- SEA Games: (silver) : 2025

Thailand U-20

- AFC U-20 Futsal Championship: (bronze) Third-place (1) : 2017

(Vietnam) TSN Hồ Chí Minh City FC

- AFC Futsal Club Championship: (silver) Runner-up: 2018

Vietnam

- AFF Futsal Championship: (bronze) Third-place 2019

=== Certification ===
- FIFA Futsal instructor.
- RFEF Level 3 Futsal coaching certificate.
