= Kensuke Takahashi (futsal player) =

Japanese futsal player & manager (born 1982)

Personal information
- Full name: Kensuke Takahashi
- Date of birth: 8 May 1982 (age 44)
- Place of birth: Asahikawa, Hokkaido, Japan
- Height: 1.73 m (5 ft 8 in)
- Position: Wing

Youth career
- 1998–2001: Asahikawa Jitsugyo High School (soccer)
- 2001–2003: Juntendo University (soccer)
- 2003–2004: Juntendo University

Senior career*
Years	Team	Apps	(Gls)
2003–2004	Divertido S.S.P		
2004–2008	Bardral Urayasu		
2008–2010	Caja Segovia FS		
2010–2011	UD Guadalajara FS		
2011–2016	Bardral Urayasu		

International career
2004–2012	Japan		

Managerial career
- 2017–2018: Bardral Urayasu
- 2018–2021: Indonesia
- 2019–2021: Indonesia U-20
- 2019–2021: Indonesia women
- 2021–2024: Japan U-20
- 2021–2024: Japan (assistant)
- 2024–: Japan
- * Club domestic league appearances and goals

Kensuke Takahashi (高橋 健介, Takahashi Kensuke; born 8 May 1982), is a former Japanese futsal player and current futsal manager. As a player, he was a member of the Japanese national futsal team. Currently, he is the head coach of the Japan national futsal team.

== Club career ==
=== Early career ===
In 1982, he was born in Asahikawa, Hokkaido, Japan. He graduated from Asahikawa City Midorigaoka Junior High School and Hokkaido Asahikawa Business High School. He played soccer in junior high school and high school. When he entered Juntendo University in 2001, he switched from soccer to futsal in his third year of university.

=== Bardral Urayasu (first stint) ===
In 2004, he joined PREDATOR (which were eventually renamed as Bardral Urayasu). In 2007, the first F.League was held as Japan's first national league. In 2007–08 season, he scored 7 goals in the F.League.

=== Playing in Spain ===
In July 2008, he joined to Caja Segovia FS in the Spanish Primera Division. He signed a professional contract with a number of 10. In the 2009–10 season, he became the main player of the Kaha Segovia FS. In 2010, he joined to UD Guadalajara FS in the Spanish Primera Division.

=== Bardral Urayasu (second stint) ===
In May 2011, he rejoined his old club, Bardral Urayasu. In 2011–12 season, he was selected the F.League Best 5. After 2015–16 season, he retired from futsal.

== International career ==
In May 2004, he participated in the 2004 AFC Futsal Championship. In November 2004, he participated in the 2004 FIFA Futsal World Championship. In both competitions, he was the youngest player of Japanese national futsal team. In May 2005, he participated in the 2005 AFC Futsal Championship.

He was unable to participate in the 2008 FIFA Futsal World Cup because of his injured right knee. In 2012, he participated in his last tournament for the national team, the 2012 FIFA Futsal World Cup.

== Managerial career ==
=== Bardral Urayasu ===
In 2016, he became technical director of Bardral Urayasu. In 2017, he took over as manager of Bardral Urayasu.

=== Indonesia national futsal team ===
In April 2018, he was appointed by the Indonesian Futsal Federation as manager of Indonesia national futsal team. He was in charge of the senior national futsal teams, both men and women, and also the youth U-20 national futsal team. He first brought the women team into the quarter-finals of the 2018 AFC Women's Futsal Championship. In the 2018 AFF Futsal Championship, he led the men senior team to third place. Next, he led the men U-20 team to the semifinals of the 2019 AFC U-20 Futsal Championship, finishing the tournament as fourth place. He then led the men senior team to the final of the 2019 AFF Futsal Championship, losing in the final to Thailand and finishing the tournament as the runner-up.

After three and a half years tenure, he declined to renew his contract and resigned from the position citing family reason.

=== Japan national futsal team ===
Right after he left Indonesia, the JFA appointed him as the new head coach of the Japan national under-20 futsal team and as an assistant coach of the Japan national futsal team.

In July 2024, he was appointed by the JFA as the new head coach of the Japan national futsal team. He replaced Kenichiro Kogure who resigned from the position on the same day.

== Honours ==
=== Player ===
==== Bardral Urayasu ====
- All Japan Futsal Championship (1)
  - 2006

==== Individual ====
- F.League Best 5 (1)
  - 2011–12

=== Manager ===
==== Indonesia ====
===== Senior =====
- AFF Futsal Championship
  - Third place: 2018
  - Runner-up: 2019

===== Under-20 =====
- AFC U-20 Futsal Championship
  - Fourth place: 2019
