= Brunei national under-20 futsal team =

Brunei Darussalam Under-20 futsal
- Nickname: Tabuan Muda (Young Wasps)
- Association: National Football Association of Brunei Darussalam (NFABD)
- Confederation: AFC (Asia)
- Sub-confederation: AFF (Southeast Asia)
- Head coach: (Malaysia) Qusmaini Noor Rusli
- FIFA code: BRU

Biggest win
- None

Biggest defeat
- Vietnam 18–0 Brunei (Nonthaburi, Thailand; 24 December 2025)

Asian Championship
- Appearances: 1 (first in 2017)
- Best result: Group stage (2017)

ASEAN Championship
- Appearances: 1 (first in 2025)
- Best result: Group stage (2025)

The Brunei national under-20 futsal team is controlled by the Futsal Committee of the National Football Association of Brunei Darussalam, the governing body for futsal in Brunei, and represent the country in international futsal competitions.

== Competition history ==
=== AFC U-20 Futsal Championship ===
AFC U-20 Futsal Championship record
Year	Result	Position	GP	W	D	L	GF	GA
(Thailand) 2017	Group stage	21st	5	0	0	5	8	41
(Iran) 2019	Did not enter							
Total	Group stage	21st	5	0	0	5	8	41

=== ASEAN U-19 Futsal Championship ===
ASEAN U-19 Futsal Championship record
Year	Result	Position	GP	W	D	L	GF	GA
(Thailand) 2025	Group stage	6th	2	0	0	2	0	27
Total	Group stage	6th	2	0	0	2	0	27

== Results and fixtures ==
=== Friendly ===
13 December 2025	Borneo Bulls Youth (Malaysia)	4–3	Brunei	Limbang, Malaysia
19:00 UTC+08:00				Stadium: Limbang Indoor Stadium

19 December 2025	Brunei	3–5	Malaysia	Bangkok, Thailand
16:00 UTC+07:00				Stadium: Phuti Anant Sports Club

20 December 2025	Brunei	3–7	(Thailand) Bangkok BTS	Bangkok, Thailand
14:00 UTC+07:00				Stadium: Kasem Bundit University Hall

20 December 2025	Brunei	0–7	(Thailand) Chonburi Bluewave	Bangkok, Thailand
16:00 UTC+07:00				Stadium: Kasem Bundit University Hall

=== 2025 ASEAN U-19 Futsal Championship ===
23 December 2025	Thailand	9–0	Brunei	Nonthaburi, Thailand
20:00 UTC+07:00	Phakphum 2'; Poompuchid 11', 32'; Setthawut 14', 20'; Sorrawit 29', 29'; Natthaphon 30'; Thanakrit 31'	Report		Stadium: Nonthaburi Gymnasium

24 December 2025	Vietnam	18–0	Brunei	Nonthaburi, Thailand
20:00 UTC+07:00	Đỗ Tuấn Vũ 4', 33'; Hoàng Minh Thức 7', 14'; Nguyễn Thạc Hiếu 9', 18', 26'; Nguyễn Thọ Minh Huy 14', 21', 27'; Nguyễn Huỳnh Tuấn 20', 30'; Trần Lê Bộ 23'; Adib Iqbal 25' (o.g.); Vũ Đại Học 26'; Đào Ngọc Trưởng 34'; Harith Hidawi 35' (o.g.); Nguyễn Minh Lương 38'; Phạm Quang Huy 38'	Report		Stadium: Nonthaburi Gymnasium

== Players ==
=== Current squad ===
The following players were called up for the 2025 ASEAN U-19 Futsal Championship in Thailand in December 2025.

No.	Pos.	Player	Date of birth (age)	Caps	Club
1	GK	Nur Muhammad Adi Hallim	30 January 2006 (age 20)		
2	GK	Adib Iqbal Nazib			(Brunei) Falcon Sports
3		Harith Hidawi Kamsul			(Brunei) Almerez
4		Darwish Aiman Mardianni			(Brunei) BIBD SRC
5		Danish Aiman Sahrizul	23 January 2007 (age 19)	0	(Brunei) Indera
6		Faiq Irfan Firdaus			(Brunei) Shah United
7		Nurhan Raziq Asri			(Brunei) MSSSBD
8		Irfan Amirrulnizam			
9		Adrian Zizry Nor Khairi	9 August 2006 (age 19)		
10		Adrian Zikry Nor Khairi	9 August 2006 (age 19)		
11		Hadi Aiman Hamizal	15 August 2006 (age 19)		(Brunei) Indera
12		Farrish Ballkid Karami Karamilahi			
13	GK	Safwan Asminan			
14		Nur Syafiq Aiman Salmizan Muhaimin			(Brunei) Kasuka & Ar Rawda
