= Vietnam national under-20 futsal team =

Vietnam
- Association: Vietnam Football Federation (VFF)
- Confederation: AFC (Asia)
- Sub-confederation: AFF (Southeast Asia)
- Head coach: Nguyễn Anh Khoa
- Captain: Nguyễn Minh Lương
- Most caps: Trần Minh Phát (9)
- Top scorer: Dương Ngọc Linh (5)
- Home stadium: Various
- FIFA code: VIE
First colours	Second colours

First international
- Vietnam 4–1 Uzbekistan (Bangkok, Thailand; 10 May 2017)

Biggest win
- Vietnam 18–0 Brunei (Nonthaburi, Thailand; 24 December 2025)

Biggest defeat
- Vietnam 0–14 Russia (Ho Chi Minh City, Vietnam; 11 April 2026)

Asian Cup
- Appearances: 2 (first in 2017)
- Best result: Quarter-finals (2019)

ASEAN Championship
- Appearances: 1 (first in 2025)
- Best result: Fourth place (2025)

The Vietnam national under-19 and under-20 futsal team represents Vietnam at international youth futsal competitions for age under-19, and under-20. It is administered by the Vietnam Football Federation (VFF).

== Matches ==
Win Draw Loss Fixture

=== 2025 ===
24 December ASEAN Championship GS	Vietnam	18–0	Brunei	Nonthaburi, Thailand
20:00 UTC+7	Đỗ Tuấn Vũ 4', 33'; Hoàng Minh Thức 7', 14'; Nguyễn Thạc Hiếu 9', 18', 26'; Nguyễn Thọ Minh Huy 14', 21', 27'; Nguyễn Huỳnh Tuấn Việt 20', 30'; Trần Lê Bộ 24'; Adib Iqbal 25' (o.g.); Vũ Đại Học 27'; Đào Ngọc Trường 34'; Hidawi Kamsul 35'; Nguyễn Minh Lương 38'; Phạm Quang Huy 38'	Report		Stadium: Nonthaburi Sports Complex Gymnasium

25 December ASEAN Championship GS	Thailand	2–1	Vietnam	Nonthaburi, Thailand
20:00 UTC+7				Stadium: Nonthaburi Sports Complex Gymnasium

27 December ASEAN Championship SF	Indonesia	7–3	Vietnam	Nonthaburi, Thailand
16:00 UTC+7				Stadium: Nonthaburi Sports Complex Gymnasium

29 December ASEAN Championship third place play-off	Malaysia	2–2 (4–3 p)	Vietnam	Nonthaburi, Thailand
13:00 UTC+7 or 19:00 UTC+7				Stadium: Nonthaburi Sports Complex Gymnasium

=== 2026 ===
11 April Friendly	Vietnam	0–14	Russia	Ho Chi Minh City, Vietnam
--:-- UTC+7				Stadium: Lãnh Binh Thăng

13 April Friendly	Vietnam	0–5	Russia	Ho Chi Minh City, Vietnam
--:-- UTC+7				Stadium: Lãnh Binh Thăng

== Coaching staff ==
Role	Name	Start date
Head coach	(Vietnam) Nguyễn Anh Khoa	October 2025
Physical coach	Vacant	
Assistant coach	(Vietnam) Nguyễn Tuấn Anh	October 2025
Assistant coach	Vacant	
Interpreter	Vacant	
Physiotherapist	Vacant	

== Players ==
=== Current squad ===
The following 20 players were named in the final squad for the 2025 ASEAN U-19 Futsal Championship.

Caps and goals as of 18 June 2019 after the match against Indonesia.

No.	Pos.	Player	Date of birth (age)	Caps	Goals	Club
	GK	Đoàn Tuấn Phong		0	0	(Vietnam Football Federation) Thái Sơn Bắc
	GK	Trương Văn Khánh		0	0	(Vietnam Football Federation) Sài Gòn Titans
	DF	Hoàng Minh Thức		0	0	(Vietnam Football Federation) Thái Sơn Nam HCMC
	DF	Đào Ngọc Trường		0	0	(Vietnam Football Federation) Thái Sơn Bắc
	DF	Nguyễn Minh Lương (captain)		0	0	(Vietnam Football Federation) Sahako
	DF	Nguyễn Huỳnh Tuấn Việt		0	0	(Vietnam Football Federation) Sahako
	MF	Nguyễn Trọng Phúc		0	0	(Vietnam Football Federation) Thái Sơn Nam HCMC
	MF	Lê Bá Thái		0	0	(Vietnam Football Federation) Thái Sơn Nam HCMC
	MF	Phạm Quang Huy		0	0	(Vietnam Football Federation) Thái Sơn Bắc
	MF	Đỗ Văn Thành		0	0	(Vietnam Football Federation) Thái Sơn Bắc
	MF	Nguyễn Thạc Hiếu		0	0	(Vietnam Football Federation) Thái Sơn Bắc
	MF	Nguyễn Thọ Minh Huy		0	0	(Vietnam Football Federation) Sahako
	MF	Đỗ Tuấn Vũ		0	0	(Vietnam Football Federation) Sahako
	FW	Trần Lê Bộ		0	0	(Vietnam Football Federation) Thái Sơn Nam HCMC
	FW	Nguyễn Trương Hoàng Long		0	0	(Vietnam Football Federation) Sahako
	FW	Vũ Đại Học		0	0	(Vietnam Football Federation) Tân Hiệp Hưng HCMC

=== Recent call-ups ===
The following players have also been called up to the squad within the last 12 months.

Pos.	Player	Date of birth (age)	Caps	Goals	Club	Latest call-up
GK	Huỳnh Tấn Bản		0	0	(Vietnam) Thái Sơn Nam HCMC	2025 ASEAN U-19 Futsal Championship^{PRE}
GK	Mai Văn Hoàng		0	0	(Vietnam) Sahako	2025 ASEAN U-19 Futsal Championship^{PRE}
MF	Phạm Văn Ngọc Viết		0	0	(Vietnam) Sahako	2025 ASEAN U-19 Futsal Championship^{PRE}
FW	Nguyễn Văn Trà		0	0	(Vietnam) Thái Sơn Nam HCMC	2025 ASEAN U-19 Futsal Championship^{PRE}
^{INJ} Player withdrew from the squad due to an injury.^{PRE} Preliminary squad.^{OTH} Player withdrew from the squad due to other reasons.^{SUS} Serving suspension

== Competititive records ==
=== Continental ===
AFC U-20 Futsal Asian Cup record									AFC U-20 Futsal Asian Cup qualification record					
Year	Round	Position	Pld	W	D*	L	GF	GA	Pld	W	D	L	GF	GA
(Thailand) 2017	Group stage	9th	4	2	1	1	11	10	Was not held					
(Iran) 2019	Quarter-finals	7th	3	1	0	2	8	10	4	2	2	0	8	6
Total	0 titles	2/2	7	3	1*	3	19	20	4	2	2	0	8	6

*Denotes draws include knockout matches decided on penalty kicks.
**Round = Group stage or Round of 16 or Quarter-finals or Semi-finals or Final.

AFC U-20 Futsal Asian Cup history
Year	Round	Opponent	Score	Result	Venue
2017	Group stage	Tajikistan	2–4	Won	Bangkok, Thailand
2017	Group stage	Indonesia	1–1	Draw	Bangkok, Thailand
2017	Group stage	Chinese Taipei	5–4	Won	Bangkok, Thailand
2017	Group stage	Japan	1–3	Loss	Bangkok, Thailand
2019	Group stage	Tajikistan	2–1	Won	Tabriz, Iran
2019	Group stage	Japan	1–2	Loss	Tabriz, Iran
2019	Quarter-finals	Indonesia	5–7	Loss	Tabriz, Iran

=== Regional ===
ASEAN U-19 Futsal Championship record
Year	Round	Position	Pld	W	D*	L	GF	GA
(Thailand) 2025	Fourth Place	4th	4	1	1	2	24	11
Total	Fourth Place	1/1	4	1	1	2	24	11

*Denotes draws include knockout matches decided on penalty kicks.
**Round = Group stage or Round of 16 or Quarter-finals or Semi-finals or Final.

ASEAN U-19 Futsal Championship record
Year	Round	Opponent	Score	Result	Venue
2025	Group stage	Brunei	18–0	Won	Nonthaburi, Thailand
2025	Group stage	Thailand	1–2	Loss	Nonthaburi, Thailand
2025	Semi-finals	Indonesia	3–7	Loss	Nonthaburi, Thailand
2025	Third place play-off	Malaysia	2–2 (pens. 3–4)	Loss	Nonthaburi, Thailand

== See also ==
- Vietnam's team
- Vietnam U-17
- Futsal Cup Vietnam
- Vietnam League
