= 2021 AFC U-20 Futsal Asian Cup =

Tournament details
- Dates: Cancelled
- Teams: 12 (expected) (from 1 confederation)
- Venue: TBD (in TBD host cities)

The 2021 AFC U-20 Futsal Asian Cup was meant to be the third edition of AFC U-20 Futsal Asian Cup (previously the AFC U-20 Futsal Championship before rebranding from 2021), the biennial international futsal championship organised by the Asian Football Confederation (AFC) for the men's youth national futsal teams of Asia. The tournament was originally scheduled between 22 and 30 May 2021, but had been postponed due to the COVID-19 pandemic.

A total of 12 teams are expected to take part in the tournament. Japan are the defending champions.

== Qualification ==
Qualification matches were originally scheduled between 14 and 26 October 2020, but had been postponed due to the COVID-19 pandemic.
