= Malaysia national under-20 futsal team =

Futsal team

Malaysia Under-20
- Shirt badge/Association crest
- Nickname(s): Majestic Tigers; Harimau Malaya
- Association: Football Association of Malaysia (FAM)
- Confederation: AFC (Asia)
- FIFA code: MAS
Home colours	Away colours

AFC U-20 Futsal Championship
- Appearances: 1 (First in 2017)
- Best result: Group stage (2017)

ASEAN Championship
- Appearances: 1 (First in 2025)
- Best result: Third place (2025)

The Malaysia national under-20 futsal team for under 20 level represents Malaysia in international futsal competitions and is controlled by the Futsal Commission of the Football Association of Malaysia.

They have appeared in one U20 futsal tournament, the AFC U-20 Futsal Championship in 2017. They finished fourth in Group A, with 2 wins against Brunei and Bahrain, but were unfortunately 2 places off qualification to the knockout rounds.

== Results and fixtures ==
=== All time results ===
Win Draw Loss

Recent results within last 12 months and upcoming fixtures.

=== 2025 ===
24 December 2025 ASEAN Championship GS	Malaysia	3–3	Myanmar	Nonthaburi, Thailand
14:00 UTC+7	Iqbal 6'; Amsyar 30'; Adam 33'	Report	Kyaw Min Khant 5'; Hae Mar Htay 10'; Kaung Htet Naing 18'	Stadium: Nonthaburi Gymnasium

25 December 2025 ASEAN Championship GS	Malaysia	0–1	Indonesia	Nonthaburi, Thailand
14:00 UTC+7		Report	Ferdiansyah 1'	Stadium: Nonthaburi Gymnasium

27 December 2025 ASEAN Championship SF	Malaysia	4–4 (a.e.t.) (3–4 p)	Thailand	Nonthaburi, Thailand
19:00 UTC+7				Stadium: Nonthaburi Gymnasium
	Penalties
	Penalty scored Penalty missed		Penalty scored

29 December 2025 ASEAN Championship third place play-off	Vietnam	2–2 (a.e.t.) (3–4 p)	Malaysia	Nonthaburi, Thailand
13:00 UTC+7				Stadium: Nonthaburi Gymnasium
	Penalties
	Penalty missed Penalty scored		Penalty missed Penalty scored

== Competitive record ==
=== AFC U-20 Futsal Asian Cup ===
AFC U-20 Futsal Asian Cup record									AFC U-20 Futsal Asian Cup qualification record					
Year	Round	Position	Pld	W	D	L	GF	GA	Pld	W	D	L	GF	GA
(Thailand) 2017	Group stage	11	5	2	0	3	18	17	Was not held					
(Iran) 2019	Did not qualify								4	1	0	3	6	10
Total	0 titles	1/2	5	2	0	3	18	17	4	1	0	3	6	10

*Denotes draws include knockout matches decided on penalty kicks.

=== AFF U-19 Futsal Championship ===
ASEAN U-19 Futsal Championship record
Year	Round	Position	Pld	W	D*	L	GF	GA
(Thailand) 2025	Third place	3rd	4	0	3	1	9	10
Total	Third place	3rd	4	0	3	1	9	10

*Denotes draws include knockout matches decided on penalty kicks.
