= 2025 ASEAN U-19 Boys' Futsal Championship =

การแข่งขันฟุตซอลชายรุ่นอายุไม่เกิน 19 ปี อาเซียน ปี 2025 (in Thai)

Tournament details
- Host country: Thailand
- City: Nonthaburi
- Dates: 23–29 December
- Teams: 6 (from 1 sub-confederation)
- Venue: 1 (in 1 host city)

Final positions
- Champions: Thailand (1st title)
- Runners-up: Indonesia
- Third place: Malaysia
- Fourth place: Vietnam

Tournament statistics
- Matches played: 10
- Goals scored: 68 (6.8 per match)

The 2025 ASEAN U-19 Boys' Futsal Championship was the first edition of the ASEAN U-19 Boys' Futsal Championship, the biennial international youth futsal championship organised by AFF for the men's under-19 national teams of Southeast Asia. The tournament was hosted at the Nonthaburi Gymnasium, Thailand from 22 to 28 December. A total of six nations participated in the final tournament, with players born on or after 1 January 2006 being eligible to participate.

Thailand became an inaugural champion on this competition, defeating Indonesia 3–1 in the final.

== Participating teams ==
The following teams participated for the final tournament.

Team
Thailand (H)
Vietnam
Brunei
Indonesia
Myanmar
Malaysia

=== Draw ===
The group stage draw was held on 28 October 2025 in Bangkok, Thailand.

== Squads ==
Each national team submitted a squad of 14 players, two of whom had to be goalkeepers.

== Group stage ==
The group winners and runners-up advance to the semi-finals.

Tiebreakers

In the group stage, teams are ranked according to points (3 points for a win, 1 point for a draw, 0 points for a loss), and if tied on points, the following tiebreaking criteria are applied, in the order given, to determine the rankings:

1. Points in head-to-head matches among tied teams;
2. Goal difference in head-to-head matches among tied teams;
3. Goals scored in head-to-head matches among tied teams;
4. If more than two teams are tied, and after applying all head-to-head criteria above, a subset of teams are still tied, all head-to-head criteria above are reapplied exclusively to this subset of teams;
5. Goal difference in all group matches;
6. Goals scored in all group matches;
7. Penalty shoot-out if only two teams have the same number of points, and they met in the last round of the group and are tied after applying all criteria above (not used if more than two teams have the same number of points, or if their rankings are not relevant for qualification for the next stage);
8. Disciplinary points (red card = 3 points, yellow card = 1 point, expulsion for two yellow cards in one match = 3 points);
9. Drawing of lots.

All times are local, ICT (UTC+7)

=== Group A ===
Pos	Team	Pld	W	D	L	GF	GA	GD	Pts	Qualification
1	Thailand (H)	2	2	0	0	11	1	+10	6	Knockout stage
2	Vietnam	2	1	0	1	19	2	+17	3	Knockout stage
3	Brunei	2	0	0	2	0	27	−27	0	

Source: AFF
Rules for classification: Group stage tiebreakers
(H) Hosts
23 December 2025
20:00

Thailand	9–0	Brunei
Poompuchid 11', 32'; Setthawut 14', 20'; Sorrawit 29', 29'; Natthaphon 30'; Thanakrit 31'	Report

Nonthaburi Gymnasium, Nonthaburi

24 December 2025
20:00

Brunei	0–18	Vietnam
	Report	Đỗ Tuấn Vũ 4', 33'; Hoàng Minh Thức 7', 14'; Nguyễn Thạc Hiếu 9', 18', 26'; Nguyễn Thọ Minh Huy 14', 21', 27'; Nguyễn Huỳnh Tuấn Việt 20', 30'; Trần Lê Bộ 24'; Adib Iqbal 25' (o.g.); Vũ Đại Học 27'; Đào Ngọc Trường 34'; Hidawi Kamsul 35' (o.g.); Nguyễn Minh Lương 38'; Phạm Quang Huy 38'

Nonthaburi Gymnasium, Nonthaburi

25 December 2025
20:00

Vietnam	1–2	Thailand
Đỗ Văn Thành 2'	Report	Setthawut 22'; Wacharin 23'

Nonthaburi Gymnasium, Nonthaburi

=== Group B ===
Pos	Team	Pld	W	D	L	GF	GA	GD	Pts	Qualification
1	Indonesia	2	2	0	0	5	1	+4	6	Knockout stage
2	Malaysia	2	0	1	1	3	4	−1	1	Knockout stage
3	Myanmar	2	0	1	1	4	7	−3	1	

Source: AFF
Rules for classification: Group stage tiebreakers
23 December 2025
14:00

Malaysia	3–3	Myanmar
Iqbal 6'; Amsyar 30'; Adam 33'	Report	Kyaw Min Khant 5'; Hae Mar Htay 10'; Kaung Htet Naing 18'

Nonthaburi Gymnasium, Nonthaburi

24 December 2025
14:00

Myanmar	1–4	Indonesia
Hae Mar Htay 28'	Report	Erlangga 6'; Revian 21'; Masdar 26'; Caserio 40'

Nonthaburi Gymnasium, Nonthaburi

25 December 2025
14:00

Malaysia	0–1	Indonesia
	Report	Ferdiansyah 1'

Nonthaburi Gymnasium, Nonthaburi

== Knockout stage ==
In the knockout stage, extra time and penalty shoot-out are used to decide the winner if necessary.

All times are local, ICT (UTC+7)

=== Bracket ===
Semi-finals
27 December – Nonthaburi
Thailand	4 (4)
Malaysia	4 (3)
27 December – Nonthaburi
Indonesia	7
Vietnam	3

Final
29 December – Nonthaburi
Indonesia	1
Thailand	3
Third place play-off
29 December – Nonthaburi
Vietnam	2 (3)
Malaysia	2 (4)

=== Semi-finals ===
27 December 2025
16:00

Indonesia	7–3	Vietnam

Nonthaburi Gymnasium, Nonthaburi

27 December 2025
19:00

Malaysia	4–4 (a.e.t.)	Thailand
Penalties
Penalty scored Penalty missed	3–4	Penalty scored

Nonthaburi Gymnasium, Nonthaburi

=== Third place play-off ===
29 December 2025
13:00

Vietnam	2–2	Malaysia
Penalties
Penalty missed Penalty scored	3–4	Penalty missed Penalty scored

Nonthaburi Gymnasium, Nonthaburi

=== Final ===
29 December 2025
19:00

Thailand	3–1	Indonesia

Nonthaburi Gymnasium, Nonthaburi

== Winners ==
ASEAN U-19 Futsal Championship

Thailand
1st title

== Final ranking ==
As per statistical convention in futsal, matches decided in extra time are counted as wins and losses, while matches decided by penalty shoot-outs are counted as draws.

Pos	Team	Pld	W	D	L	GF	GA	GD	Pts	Final result
1	Thailand	4	3	1	0	18	6	+12	10	Gold medal
2	Indonesia	4	3	0	1	13	7	+6	9	Silver medal
3	Malaysia	4	0	3	1	9	10	−1	3	Bronze medal
4	Vietnam	4	1	1	2	24	11	+13	4	Fourth place
5	Myanmar	2	0	1	1	4	7	−3	1	Eliminated in group stage
6	Brunei	2	0	0	2	0	27	−27	0	Eliminated in group stage

== See also ==
- 2025 ASEAN U-16 Boys' Futsal Championship
