= 2019 AFC U-20 Futsal Championship =

2019 Asian U-20 Futsal Championship
2019 مسابقات قهرمانی فوتسال زیر ۲۰ سال آسیا
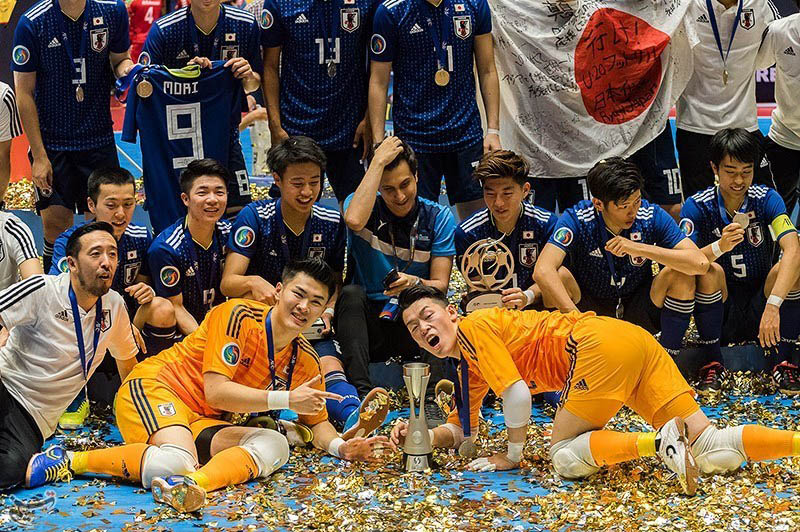

Tournament details
- Host country: Iran
- City: Tabriz
- Dates: 14–22 June
- Teams: 12 (from 1 confederation)
- Venue: 1

Final positions
- Champions: Japan (1st title)
- Runners-up: Afghanistan
- Third place: Iran
- Fourth place: Indonesia

Tournament statistics
- Matches played: 20
- Goals scored: 128 (6.4 per match)
- Attendance: 14,031 (702 per match)
- Top scorer: (Iran) Salar Aghapour (8 goals)
- Best player: (Japan) Masashi Osawa
- Fair play award: Japan

The 2019 AFC U-20 Futsal Championship was the second edition of the biennial international futsal championship organised by the Asian Football Confederation for men's youth national futsal teams of Asia.

The tournament was hosted by Iran between 14 and 22 June 2019. A total of 12 teams participated of tournament. IR Iran were the defending champion but failed to defend the title after losing to Japan in the semi-final. Japan became the champions after beating Afghanistan in the final. Qualification OF 2020 FIFA U-20 Futsal World Cup

== Qualification ==
Unlike the previous tournament where all teams entered the final tournament, qualifiers were held from 1 to 10 December 2018. The draw for the qualifiers was held on 30 August 2018.

=== Qualified teams ===
The following 12 teams qualified for the final tournament.

Team	Qualified as	Appearance	Previous best performance
Thailand	ASEAN Zone winners	2nd	Third place (2017)
Vietnam	ASEAN Zone runners-up	2nd	Group stage (2017)
Indonesia	ASEAN Zone third place	2nd	Quarter-finals (2017)
Iran	Central Zone Group A winners and Hosts	2nd	Champions (2017)
Kyrgyzstan	Central Zone Group B winners	2nd	Group stage (2017)
Afghanistan	Central Zone play-off winners	2nd	Group stage (2017)
Tajikistan	Central Zone play-off losers	2nd	Group stage (2017)
Japan	East Zone Group A winners	2nd	Quarter-finals (2017)
Chinese Taipei	East Zone Group B winners	2nd	Group stage (2017)
Hong Kong (Note: Hong Kong replaced Saudi Arabia (West Zone play-off winners) after they withdrew.)	East Zone best runners-up	2nd	Group Stage (2017)
Lebanon	West Zone Group A winners	2nd	Quarter-finals (2017)
Iraq	West Zone Group B winners	2nd	Runners-up (2017)

== Venue ==
The matches were played at the Shahid Poursharifi Arena in Tabriz.

Tabriz
Shahid Poursharifi Arena
Capacity: 6,000

== Draw ==
The final draw was held on 11 April 2019, 15:30 MYT (UTC+8), at the AFC House in Kuala Lumpur. The 12 teams were drawn into four groups of three teams. The teams were seeded according to their performance in the 2017 AFC U-20 Futsal Championship final tournament, with the hosts automatically seeded and assigned to Position A1 in the draw.

Pot 1	Pot 2	Pot 3
1. Iran (hosts); 2. Iraq; 3. Thailand; 4. Japan	5. Indonesia; 6. Lebanon; 7. Vietnam; 8. Afghanistan	9. Hong Kong; 10. Tajikistan; 11. Kyrgyzstan; 12. Chinese Taipei

== Squads ==
Players born after 1 January 1999 were eligible to compete in the tournament. Each team must register a squad of 14 players, minimum two of whom must be goalkeepers (Regulations Articles 27.1 and 27.2).

== Group stage ==
The top two teams of each group advanced to the quarter-finals.

Tiebreakers

Teams were ranked according to points (3 points for a win, 1 point for a draw, 0 points for a loss), and if tied on points, the following tiebreaking criteria were applied, in the order given, to determine the rankings (Regulations Article 11.5):

1. Points in head-to-head matches among tied teams;
2. Goal difference in head-to-head matches among tied teams;
3. Goals scored in head-to-head matches among tied teams;
4. If more than two teams are tied, and after applying all head-to-head criteria above, a subset of teams are still tied, all head-to-head criteria above are reapplied exclusively to this subset of teams;
5. Goal difference in all group matches;
6. Goals scored in all group matches;
7. Penalty shoot-out if only two teams are tied and they met in the last round of the group;
8. Disciplinary points (yellow card = 1 point, red card as a result of two yellow cards = 3 points, direct red card = 3 points, yellow card followed by direct red card = 4 points);
9. Drawing of lots.

All times are local, IRDT (UTC+4:30).

Schedule
Matchday	Dates	Matches
Matchday 1	14 June 2019	3 v 1
Matchday 2	15 June 2019	2 v 3
Matchday 3	16 June 2019	1 v 2

=== Group A ===
Pos	Team	Pld	W	D	L	GF	GA	GD	Pts	Qualification
1	Iran (H)	2	2	0	0	10	5	+5	6	Knockout stage
2	Afghanistan	2	1	0	1	8	4	+4	3	Knockout stage
3	Hong Kong	2	0	0	2	4	13	−9	0	

Source: AFC
Rules for classification: Group stage tiebreakers
(H) Hosts
14 June 2019
19:30

Hong Kong	3–7	Iran
Wong Wai Kwok 15', 17', 36'	Report	Aghapour 3', 22', 40'; Akrami 4', 5'; Esmaeili 29'; Yousef 31'

Shahid Poursharifi Arena, Tabriz
Attendance: 600
Referee: Benjapol Mucharoensap (Thailand)

15 June 2019
19:30

Afghanistan	6–1	Hong Kong
Mohammadi 6'; Zaheri 20'; Zada 22'; Yousufi 34'; Mousavi 36', 37'	Report	Chow Ka Lok Leo 28'

Shahid Poursharifi Arena, Tabriz
Attendance: 100
Referee: Kim Jong-hee (South Korea)

16 June 2019
19:30

Iran	3–2	Afghanistan
Yousef 3', 31'; Ghanbari 30'	Report	Zada 18'; Mohammadi 38'

Shahid Poursharifi Arena, Tabriz
Attendance: 1,507
Referee: Azat Hajypolatov (Turkmenistan)

=== Group B ===
Pos	Team	Pld	W	D	L	GF	GA	GD	Pts	Qualification
1	Thailand	2	2	0	0	12	3	+9	6	Knockout stage
2	Lebanon	2	1	0	1	4	10	−6	3	Knockout stage
3	Kyrgyzstan	2	0	0	2	4	7	−3	0	

Source: AFC
Rules for classification: Group stage tiebreakers
14 June 2019
17:00

Kyrgyzstan	2–4	Thailand
Zholdoshov 7'; Isakov 8'	Report	Thawatchai 5', 17'; Siksaka 17'; Krit 27'

Shahid Poursharifi Arena, Tabriz
Attendance: 500
Referee: Leung Chung Yin (Hong Kong)

15 June 2019
17:00

Lebanon	3–2	Kyrgyzstan
Ghattas 18'; Koukezian 18'; Selwan 38'	Report	Zholdoshov 1'; Isakov 26'

Shahid Poursharifi Arena, Tabriz
Attendance: 120
Referee: Takeshi Fujita (Japan)

16 June 2019
17:00

Thailand	8–1	Lebanon
Thanawat 6'; Nattasak 8'; Siksaka 16'; Hamieh 25' (o.g.); Sivakorn 30', 39'; Chutipong 30'; Krit 34'	Report	Shehab 36'

Shahid Poursharifi Arena, Tabriz
Attendance: 300
Referee: Kim Jong-hee (South Korea)

=== Group C ===
Pos	Team	Pld	W	D	L	GF	GA	GD	Pts	Qualification
1	Japan	2	2	0	0	5	2	+3	6	Knockout stage
2	Vietnam	2	1	0	1	3	3	0	3	Knockout stage
3	Tajikistan	2	0	0	2	2	5	−3	0	

Source: AFC
Rules for classification: Group stage tiebreakers
14 June 2019
14:30

Tajikistan	1–3	Japan
Sharipov 38'	Report	Osawa 14'; Takahashi 16'; Otsuka 16'

Shahid Poursharifi Arena, Tabriz
Attendance: 75
Referee: Osama Saeed Idrees Sedaif (Bahrain)

15 June 2019
14:30

Vietnam	2–1	Tajikistan
Triệu Xuân Linh 13'; Hà Đức Ngọc 15'	Report	Yorov 11'

Shahid Poursharifi Arena, Tabriz
Attendance: 100
Referee: Ridzuan Rozali (Malaysia)

16 June 2019
14:30

Japan	2–1	Vietnam
K. Yamada 14'; Motoishi 18'	Report	An Lâm Tới 14'

Shahid Poursharifi Arena, Tabriz
Attendance: 80
Referee: Ali Hafizi (Iran)

=== Group D ===
Pos	Team	Pld	W	D	L	GF	GA	GD	Pts	Qualification
1	Indonesia	2	2	0	0	8	4	+4	6	Knockout stage
2	Iraq	2	1	0	1	6	4	+2	3	Knockout stage
3	Chinese Taipei	2	0	0	2	5	11	−6	0	

Source: AFC
Rules for classification: Group stage tiebreakers
14 June 2019
12:00

Chinese Taipei	2–5	Iraq
Huang Yu-wei 3'; Chen Ching-hang 28'	Report	Hussein 10', 10'; Muwafaq 11' (pen.); Zamil 34'; Haitham 39'

Shahid Poursharifi Arena, Tabriz
Attendance: 500
Referee: Ali Hafizi (Iran)

15 June 2019
12:00

Indonesia	6–3	Chinese Taipei
Afif 2'; Abdussalam 6'; Inzaghi 9' (pen.); Sanjaya 16', 27', 28'	Report	Fu Wei-da 5'; Huang Yu-wei 12'; Chen Ching-hang 28'

Shahid Poursharifi Arena, Tabriz
Attendance: 150
Referee: Andrew Best (Australia)

16 June 2019
12:00

Iraq	1–2	Indonesia
Hamid 21'	Report	Firman 9'; Ari 17'

Shahid Poursharifi Arena, Tabriz
Attendance: 100
Referee: Benjapol Mucharoensap (Thailand)

== Knockout stage ==
In the knockout stage, extra time and penalty shoot-out were used to decide the winner if necessary, except for the third place match where penalty shoot-out (no extra time) was used to decide the winner if necessary (Regulations Articles 15.1 and 16.1).

=== Bracket ===
Quarter-finals
18 June – Shahid Poursharifi Arena
Iran (a.e.t.)	3
Lebanon	2
18 June – Shahid Poursharifi Arena
Japan	2
Iraq	0
18 June – Shahid Poursharifi Arena
Thailand	2
Afghanistan	3
18 June – Shahid Poursharifi Arena
Indonesia	7
Vietnam	5

Semi-finals
20 June – Shahid Poursharifi Arena
Iran	4
Japan (a.e.t.)	8
20 June – Shahid Poursharifi Arena
Afghanistan (a.e.t.)	4
Indonesia	3

Final
22 June – Shahid Poursharifi Arena
Japan	3
Afghanistan	1
Third place match
22 June – Shahid Poursharifi Arena
Iran	9
Indonesia	1

=== Quarter-finals ===
18 June 2019
11:00

Indonesia	7–5	Vietnam
Abdussalam 10'; Syaifullah 15', 22'; Sanjaya 25'; Agung 27', 32', 35'	Report	Nhan Gia Hưng 29'; Nguyễn Huỳnh Thanh Huy 34', 38'; An Lâm Tới 38'; Huỳnh Mi Woen 40'

Shahid Poursharifi Arena, Tabriz
Attendance: 100
Referee: Mahmoudreza Nasirloo (Iran)

18 June 2019
14:00

Japan	2–0	Iraq
Hagiwara 5'; Matsukawa 38'	Report

Shahid Poursharifi Arena, Tabriz
Attendance: 110
Referee: Darius Turner (Australia)

18 June 2019
17:00

Thailand	2–3	Afghanistan
Thanawat 22'; Haidari 39' (o.g.)	Report	Mousavi 2', 13'; Mahmoodi 18'

Shahid Poursharifi Arena, Tabriz
Attendance: 200
Referee: Tomohiro Kozaki (Japan)

18 June 2019
20:00

Iran	3–2 (a.e.t.)	Lebanon
Aghapour 8', 45'; Ghanbari 48'	Report	Selwan 39'; Koukezian 49'

Shahid Poursharifi Arena, Tabriz
Attendance: 1,956
Referee: Liu Jianqiao (China)

=== Semi-finals ===
20 June 2019
15:30

Afghanistan	4–3 (a.e.t.)	Indonesia
Mousavi 8', 43'; Zada 29'; Yousufi 45'	Report	Xavier 22'; Agung 30'; Sanjaya 50'

Shahid Poursharifi Arena, Tabriz
Attendance: 300
Referee: Osama Saeed Idrees Sedaif (Bahrain)

20 June 2019
18:30

Iran	4–8 (a.e.t.)	Japan
Yousef 10'; Sarbaz 17'; Dehghan 24', 30'	Report	Hashimoto 4'; Otsuka 18'; Osawa 23'; Motoishi 40' (pen.); Iguchi 43'; J. Yamada 46'; Hatakeyama 47'; Kimura 49'

Shahid Poursharifi Arena, Tabriz
Attendance: 2,105
Referee: Mohamad Chami (Lebanon)

=== Third place match ===
22 June 2019
16:00

Iran	9–1	Indonesia
Aghapour 3', 6', 25' (pen.); Akrami 4'; Sarbaz 11'; Ghanbari 16'; Hosseinzadeh 17'; Esmaeili 29'; Dehghan 40'	Report	Firman 39'

Shahid Poursharifi Arena, Tabriz
Attendance: 2,254
Referee: Liu Jianqiao (China)

=== Final ===
22 June 2019
18:30

Japan	3–1	Afghanistan
Takahashi 9'; Osawa 16'; Tabuchi 38'	Report	Hossaini 34'

Shahid Poursharifi Arena, Tabriz
Attendance: 2,874
Referee: Ridzuan Rozali (Malaysia)

== Winners ==
2019 AFC U-20 Futsal Championship
(Japan)
Japan
First title

== Awards ==
The following awards were given at the conclusion of the tournament:

Top Goalscorer	Most Valuable Player	Fair Play award
(Iran) Salar Aghapour	(Japan) Masashi Osawa	Japan

== Goalscorers ==
There were 128 goals scored in 20 matches, for an average of 6.4 goals per match.

8 goals

- (Iran) Salar Aghapour

6 goals

- (Afghanistan) Seyed Mousavi

5 goals

- (Indonesia) Muhammad Sanjaya

4 goals

- (Indonesia) Agung Pandega
- (Iran) Masoud Yousef

3 goals

- (Afghanistan) Ali Zada
- (Hong Kong) Wong Wai Kwok
- (Iran) Ali Akrami
- (Iran) Mahdi Dehghan
- (Iran) Reza Ghanbari
- (Japan) Masashi Osawa

2 goals

- (Afghanistan) Mojtaba Mohammadi
- (Afghanistan) Dawood Yousufi
- (Chinese Taipei) Chen Ching-hang
- (Chinese Taipei) Huang Yu-wei
- (Indonesia) Abdussalam
- (Indonesia) Firman Adriansyah
- (Indonesia) Muhammad Syaifullah
- (Iran) Belal Esmaeili
- (Iran) Sajjad Sarbaz
- (Iraq) Yaseen Hussein
- (Japan) Takehiro Motoishi
- (Japan) Hiroto Otsuka
- (Japan) Yudai Takahashi
- (Kyrgyzstan) Damir Isakov
- (Kyrgyzstan) Mamatziia Zholdoshov
- (Lebanon) Steve Koukezian
- (Lebanon) Jamal Selwan
- (Thailand) Krit Aransanyalak
- (Thailand) Sivakorn Jongkolthakorn
- (Thailand) Thanawat Koedbangrachan
- (Thailand) Siksaka Pramanong
- (Thailand) Thawatchai Rairat
- (Vietnam) An Lâm Tới
- (Vietnam) Nguyễn Huỳnh Thanh Huy

1 goal

- (Afghanistan) Hamid Reza Hossaini
- (Afghanistan) Farzad Mahmoodi
- (Afghanistan) Sadiq Zaheri
- (Chinese Taipei) Fu Wei-da
- (Hong Kong) Chow Ka Lok Leo
- (Indonesia) Filippo Inzaghi
- (Indonesia) Ari Ramdani
- (Indonesia) Afif Rizky
- (Indonesia) Rizki Xavier
- (Iran) Erfan Hosseinzadeh
- (Iraq) Sajjad Haitham
- (Iraq) Hussein Hamid
- (Iraq) Ali Muwafaq
- (Iraq) Hussein Zamil
- (Japan) Manatsu Hagiwara
- (Japan) Reira Hashimoto
- (Japan) Yuki Hatakeyama
- (Japan) Rintaro Iguchi
- (Japan) Yuta Kimura
- (Japan) Kota Matsukawa
- (Japan) Hiroshi Tabuchi
- (Japan) Jiei Yamada
- (Japan) Kaito Yamada
- (Lebanon) Mouafac Ghattas
- (Lebanon) Hassan Shehab
- (Tajikistan) Nasim Sharipov
- (Tajikistan) Idris Yorov
- (Thailand) Nattasak Photi
- (Thailand) Chutipong Suraditanunt
- (Vietnam) Hà Đức Ngọc
- (Vietnam) Huỳnh Mi Woen
- (Vietnam) Nhận Gia Hưng
- (Vietnam) Triệu Xuân Linh

1 own goal

- (Afghanistan) Morteza Haidari (against Thailand)
- (Lebanon) Hussein Hamieh (against Thailand)
