= Indonesia national under-20 futsal team =

Futsal team

Indonesia U-20
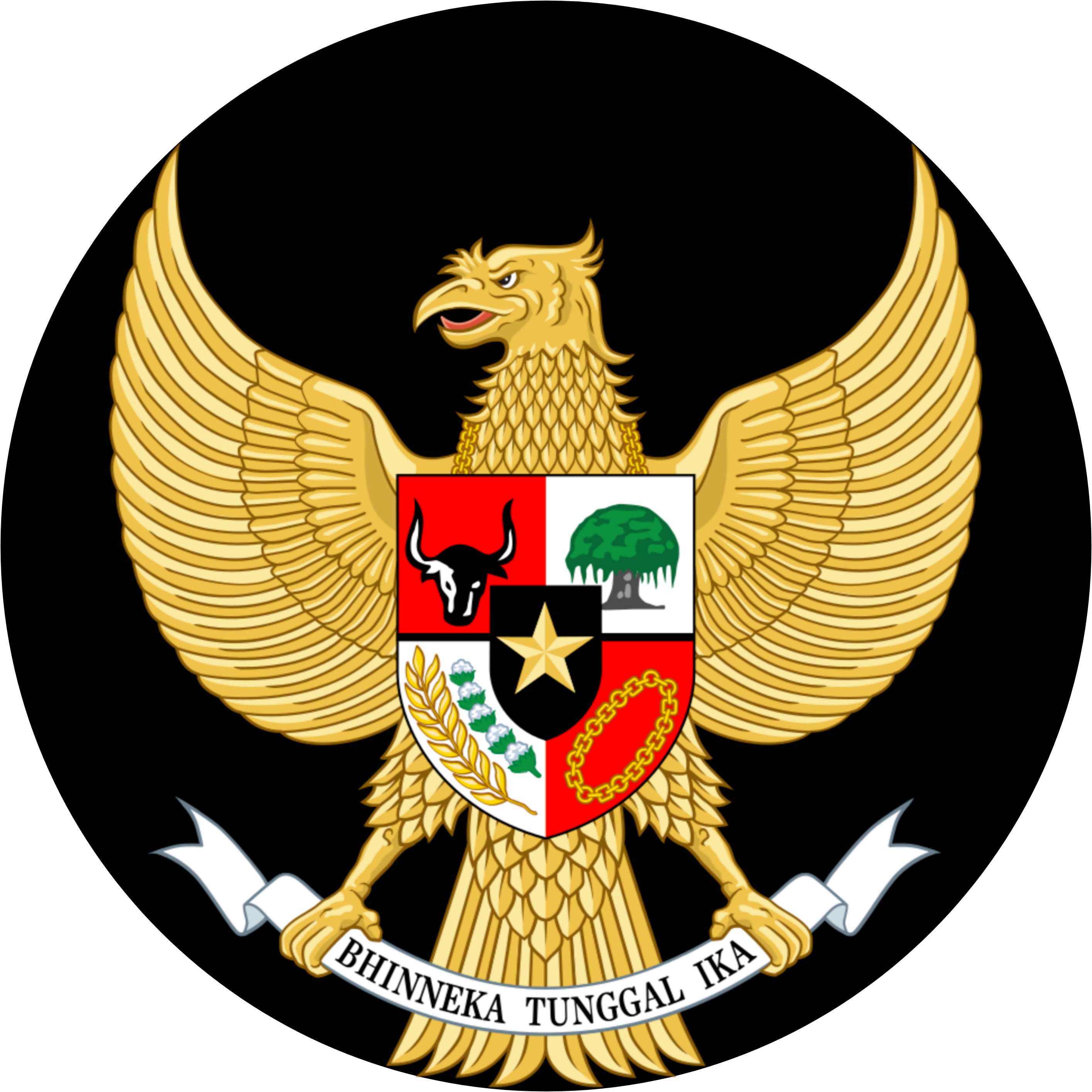
- Nickname(s): Garuda Muda (The Young Garuda); Merah Putih (The Red and White)
- Association: PSSI through FFI
- Confederation: AFC (Asia)
- Sub-confederation: AFF (Southeast Asia)
- Head coach: Naim Hamid
- FIFA code: IDN

First international
- Indonesia 5–3 Tajikistan (Bangkok, Thailand; 16 May 2017)

Biggest win
- Indonesia 9–0 Myanmar (Bangkok, Thailand; 8 December 2018)

Biggest defeat
- Iran 9–1 Indonesia (Tabriz, Iran; 22 June 2019)

AFC U-20 Futsal Asian Cup
- Appearances: 2 (first in 2017)
- Best result: Fourth place (2019)

ASEAN U-19 Futsal Championship
- Appearances: 1 (first in 2025)
- Best result: Runners-up (2025)

The Indonesia national under-20 futsal team represents Indonesia in international futsal competitions that pertain to under-20 and under-19 age levels. While under the ultimate control of Indonesia's football governing body, PSSI, the one who oversees the activities of the national futsal team is the Indonesia Futsal Federation—futsal governing body of Indonesia and a member association of PSSI.

== History ==
=== 2017: The team's formation and debut tournament ===
The team was first formed in 2017 in order to compete at the inaugural AFC U-20 Futsal Championship on May 2017 in Thailand. Vic Hermans, the newly appointed head coach of the senior team, was also given the task to form the U20 team. Due to tight preparation as Hermans was only just appointed to the position on February 2017 as well as the fact that only a few Indonesia Pro Futsal League clubs have under-20 players on their roster, player selection for the team was conducted via recommendation from participating futsal teams at the most recent PON in 2016, PFL clubs, and provincial futsal associations. FFI also held the first edition of the FFI U-20 Futsal Championship, a youth futsal tournament for under-20 players, as another player selection's method into the U20 team. With 15 mostly PFL clubs participating, the tournament was held on May 25th–31st, 2017, at GOR Pasar Minggu, South Jakarta and was closely monitored by Hermans.

The team eventually flew to Thailand. They were led by Hermans' three assistant coaches, Yos Adi Wicaksono, Dhedy Ahadiat, and Yori van der Torren, because Hermans was unable to accompany the team due to Hermans' personal issue with the Thai FA. On their debut match and their first ever international match, the team defeated Tajikistan 5–3 with goals from Arjuna Rinaldi, Faishal Ammar, Rio Pangestu, and Syauqy Saud Lubis. The team successfully qualified to the quarterfinal of the tournament after a dramatic 3–3 draw against Japan in the penultimate game of the group stage. They were stopped by host Thailand after losing 2–4 in the quarterfinal.

=== 2018–19: Bara Kaltim's experiment and semifinal finish in Asia ===
After Vic Hermans' departure in late 2017, FFI appointed former Japan national futsal team player, Kensuke Takahashi, as the new manager and head coach of the Indonesia national futsal team on April 2018. He was in charge of the senior national futsal teams, both men and women, and also the U-20 national futsal team. In his capacity as the head coach of the U20 team, he was helped by team manager, Celni Pita Sari, a local politician from East Kalimantan long involved in local futsal scene as a former team manager of APK Samarinda Futsal in 2017. Three local coaches, Ade Lesmana, Sayan Karmadi, and Wahyu Kocoy, were also appointed as assistant coaches to Takahashi.

In preparation for the 2019 AFC U-20 Futsal Asian Championship qualifiers scheduled to be held on December 2018, FFI utilized the 2018 FFI U-20 Futsal Championship as the primary player selection method for the team because there were only a few under-20 players playing for PFL clubs in the 2018 season. The tournament, now with 24 club participants, was held from June 29th to July 12th, 2018 and was closely monitored by the three assistant coaches of Takahashi. Among the 34 players who were called up for the team's training camp and the final phase of the team's player selection, the eventual tournament's winner, Kamiada FC Bekasi, sent the most player into the camp which was held from 10–17 October in Yogyakarta. The final 14-player squad to participate in the qualifiers was announced on 22 November 2018 with 4 players in the final squad came from Kamiada.

The team then flew to Thailand to participate in the ASEAN Zone of the 2019 AFC U-20 Futsal Asian Championship qualifiers on 5–9 December 2018. With the record of 2 wins against Malaysia and Myanmar, 1 draw against Vietnam, and 1 defeat from qualifier host Thailand, the team finished third with 7 points in the standings after Thailand at first and Vietnam at second and qualified for the 2019 AFC U-20 Futsal Championship scheduled to be held on 14–22 June 2019 in Tabriz, Iran. With the long gap of almost half a year between the qualifier and the main tournament, FFI took the initiative to combine the U-20 national futsal team players into one professional futsal team. U20 team manager, Celni Pita Sari, facilitated FFI's idea by forming Bara Kaltim FC, a club that she owned, and recruited all U-20 national team players, either direct signing or one season long loan from the players' original team, to play for her team. Bara Kaltim entered Group B of the 2019 PFL season to replace Mataram FC who withdrew from the league. Member of the U20 national team then joined the team in Yogyakarta, led by one of Takahashi's assistant coaches, Sayan Karmadi, right after the end of the qualifiers. Bara Kaltim finished the regular season which ended on March 24th, 2019, at 7th place in Group B of the 2019 PFL season earning 12 points with 3 wins, 3 draws, and 8 defeats.

At the 2019 AFC U-20 Futsal Asian Championship, the U20 team qualified for the knockout stage after finishing at the top of Group D with 2 wins, 6–3 against Chinese Taipei and 1–2 against Iraq. Takahashi then led his team to make history by qualifying for the semifinal of the AFC U-20 Futsal Asian Championship for the first time ever by defeating Vietnam 7–5 in the quarterfinal. However, they failed to compete in the final after goals from Rizki Xavier, Agung Pandega, and Muhammad Sanjaya were unable to prevent the team's close 3–4 defeat to Afghanistan in the semifinal. The team had to be satisfied with finishing the tournament in 4th place after suffering a comprehensive 9–1 defeat to the tournament's host Iran who lost to Japan in the semifinal.

== Competitive record ==
=== AFC U-20 Futsal Asian Cup ===
AFC U-20 Futsal Asian Cup record									AFC U-20 Futsal Asian Cup qualification record					
Year	Round	Position	Pld	W	D	L	GF	GA	Pld	W	D	L	GF	GA
(Thailand) 2017	Quarter-finals	6	5	2	2	1	17	13	Was not held					
(Iran) 2019	Fourth place	4	5	3	0	2	20	21	4	2	1	1	18	9
Total	Best: Fourth place	2/2	10	5	2	2	37	34	4	2	1	1	18	9

*Denotes draws include knockout matches decided on penalty kicks.

=== AFF U-19 Futsal Championship ===
ASEAN U-19 Futsal Championship record
Year	Round	Position	Pld	W	D*	L	GF	GA
(Thailand) 2025	Runners-up	2nd	4	3	0	1	13	7
Total	Best: Runners-up	1/1	4	3	0	1	13	7

*Denotes draws include knockout matches decided on penalty kicks.

== See also ==
- Indonesia national futsal team
- Indonesia national under-17 futsal team
- Indonesia women's national futsal team
