= AFC U-20 Futsal Asian Cup =

- Organiser(s): AFC
- Founded: 2016; 10 years ago
- Region: Asia
- Current champions: Japan (1st title)
- Most championships: Iran; Japan (1 title each)
- 2021 AFC U-20 Futsal Asian Cup

The AFC U-20 Futsal Asian Cup, previously the AFC U-20 Futsal Championship, is the premier youth futsal competition off the Asian Football Confederation It was first held in 2017 and played biennially. From 2021, the tournament to be rebranded "AFC U-20 Futsal Asian Cup".

== Results ==
Tournament names

- 2017–2019: AFC U-20 Futsal Championship
- 2021–present: AFC U-20 Futsal Asian Cup

#	Year	Host	Final			Third place match			Number of teams
#	Year	Host	Winners	Score	Runners-up	Third place	Score	Fourth place	Number of teams
1	2017; Details	Thailand	Iran	2–0	Iraq	Thailand	8–1	Uzbekistan	21
2	2019; Details	Iran	Japan	3–1	Afghanistan	Iran	9–1	Indonesia	12
—	2021; Details	Cancelled due to COVID-19 pandemic							

== Summary ==
Rank	Team	Part	M	W	D	L	GF	GA	GD	Points
1	Iran	2	12	11	0	1	68	25	+43	33
2	Thailand	2	10	8	0	2	61	26	+35	24
3	Iraq	2	11	8	0	3	37	19	+18	24
4	Japan	2	10	7	2	1	33	17	+16	23
5	Afghanistan	2	10	6	0	4	43	27	+16	18
6	Indonesia	2	10	5	2	3	36	35	+1	17
7	Uzbekistan	1	7	4	1	2	36	30	+6	13
8	Lebanon	2	8	4	1	3	24	24	0	13
9	Vietnam	2	7	3	1	3	19	20	–1	10
10	Mongolia	1	5	2	1	2	17	22	-5	7
11	Malaysia	1	5	2	0	3	18	17	+1	6
12	United Arab Emirates	1	4	2	0	2	11	14	–3	6
13	Hong Kong	2	6	2	0	4	12	25	–13	6
14	Tajikistan	2	5	1	1	3	18	19	–1	4
15	Bahrain	1	5	1	0	4	7	22	–15	3
16	Myanmar	1	4	1	0	3	7	16	–23	3
17	Kyrgyzstan	2	6	0	2	4	12	26	–14	2
18	China	1	4	0	1	3	6	15	–9	1
19	Qatar	1	4	0	0	4	8	19	–11	0
20	Chinese Taipei	2	6	0	0	6	11	32	–21	0
21	Brunei	1	5	0	0	5	8	41	–33	0

== Performance ==
Team	Champions	Runners-up	Third place	Fourth place	Total (Top 4)
Iran	1 (2017)		1 (2019*)		2
Japan	1 (2019)				1
Iraq		1 (2017)			1
Afghanistan		1 (2019)			1
Thailand			1 (2017*)		1
Uzbekistan				1 (2017)	1
Indonesia				1 (2019)	1

* = hosts

== Participating by teams ==
Teams	2017	2019	Total
Afghanistan	GS	2nd	2
Bahrain	GS	•	1
Brunei	GS	x	1
China	GS	•	1
Chinese Taipei	GS	GS	2
Hong Kong	GS	GS	2
Indonesia	QF	4th	2
Iran	1st	3rd	2
Iraq	2nd	QF	2
Japan	QF	1st	2
Kyrgyzstan	GS	GS	2
Lebanon	GS	QF	2
Malaysia	GS	•	1
Mongolia	QF	•	1
Myanmar	GS	•	1
Qatar	GS	x	1
Tajikistan	GS	GS	2
Thailand	3rd	QF	2
United Arab Emirates	GS	•	1
Uzbekistan	4th	•	1
Vietnam	GS	QF	2
Total	21	12	

Legend

- 1st – Champions
- 2nd – Runners-up
- 3rd – Third place
- 4th – Fourth place
- QF – Quarter-finals
- GS – Group stage
- q – Qualified
- — Hosts
- • – Did not qualify
- × – Did not enter
- × – Withdrew before qualification / Banned
