= 2017 AFC U-20 Futsal Championship =

ฟุตซอลเอเชียเยาวชนอายุไม่เกิน 20 ปี 2017

Tournament details
- Host country: Thailand
- City: Bangkok
- Dates: 16–26 May
- Teams: 21 (from 1 confederation)
- Venue: 2 (in 1 host city)

Final positions
- Champions: Iran (1st title)
- Runners-up: Iraq
- Third place: Thailand
- Fourth place: Uzbekistan

Tournament statistics
- Matches played: 53
- Goals scored: 364 (6.87 per match)
- Attendance: 45,235 (853 per match)
- Top scorer: (Uzbekistan) Akbar Usmonov (13 goals)
- Best player: (Iran) Touhid Lotfi
- Fair play award: Thailand

The 2017 AFC U-20 Futsal Championship was the first edition of the AFC U-20 Futsal Championship, the biennial international futsal championship organised by the Asian Football Confederation (AFC) for the men's youth national teams of Asia. The tournament was hosted by Thailand between 16 and 26 May 2017. Iran and Thailand had signaled their intent to host the inaugural competition.

A total of 21 teams participated in the tournament. The 21 teams were divided into four groups (one with six teams and three with five teams), with the group winners and runners-up advancing to the quarter-finals.

The tournament served as qualifying for the futsal tournament at the 2018 Summer Youth Olympics in Buenos Aires, with the winner and the runner-up qualifying for the boys' tournament, to be represented by their under-18 representative teams.

== Qualified teams ==
Of the 47 AFC member associations, a total of 22 teams entered the competition. There was no qualification, and all entrants advanced to the final tournament. Saudi Arabia initially entered but decided to withdraw prior to the draw.

- Afghanistan
- Bahrain
- Brunei
- China
- Chinese Taipei
- Hong Kong
- Indonesia
- Iran
- Iraq
- Japan
- Kyrgyzstan
- Lebanon
- Malaysia
- Mongolia
- Myanmar
- Qatar
- Saudi Arabia (withdrew)
- Tajikistan
- Thailand (hosts)
- United Arab Emirates
- Uzbekistan
- Vietnam

== Venues ==
The matches were played at the Bangkok Arena and Indoor Stadium Huamark in Bangkok.

Nong Chok	Bangkok Metropolis	Bang Kapi
Bangkok Arena	Bangkok Metropolis	Indoor Stadium Huamark
Capacity: 12,000	Bangkok Metropolis	Capacity: 10,000
	2017 AFC U-20 Futsal Championship (Bangkok)	

== Draw ==
The draw for the final tournament was held on 30 March 2017, 15:00 ICT (UTC+7), at the Grand Fourwings Convention Hotel in Bangkok. The 21 teams were drawn into one group of six teams (Group A) and three groups of five teams (Groups B, C and D), with the hosts Thailand automatically assigned to position A1 in the draw. As there were no previous editions, the teams were seeded according to the performances of their senior teams in the 2016 AFC Futsal Championship.

Pot 1	Pot 2	Pot 3	Pot 4	Pot 5 (unranked)
1. Iran; 2. Uzbekistan; 3. Thailand; 4. Vietnam	5. Japan; 6. Iraq; 7. Kyrgyzstan; 8. Qatar	9. China; 10. Malaysia; 11. Lebanon; 12. Chinese Taipei	13. Tajikistan	Afghanistan; Bahrain; Brunei; Hong Kong; Indonesia; Mongolia; Myanmar; United Arab Emirates

== Squads ==
Players born after 1 January 1997 were eligible to compete in the tournament. Each team must register a squad of 14 players, minimum two of whom must be goalkeepers (Regulations Articles 27.1 and 27.2).

== Match officials ==
Referees

- (Australia) Ryan Shepherd
- (Australia) Darius Turner
- (Bahrain) Osama Saeed Idrees
- (China) Liu Jianqiao
- (Chinese Taipei) Lee Po-fu
- (Iran) Vahid Arzpeyma Mohammreh
- (Iraq) Hasan Al-Gburi
- (Iraq) Hawkar Salar Ahmed
- (Japan) Takeshi Fujita
- (Japan) Hiroyuki Harada
- (Jordan) Husein Mahmoud Khalaileh
- (Kyrgyzstan) Nurdin Bukuev
- (Lebanon) Mohamad Chami
- (Malaysia) Helday Idang
- (Philippines) Rey Ritaga Martinez
- (Turkmenistan) Azat Hajypolatov
- (United Arab Emirates) Khamis Al-Shamsi
- (Uzbekistan) Anatoliy Rubakov
- (Vietnam) Trương Quốc Dũng

== Group stage ==
The top two teams of each group advanced to the quarter-finals.

Tiebreakers

Teams were ranked according to points (3 points for a win, 1 point for a draw, 0 points for a loss), and if tied on points, the following tiebreaking criteria were applied, in the order given, to determine the rankings (Regulations Article 10.5):

1. Points in head-to-head matches among tied teams;
2. Goal difference in head-to-head matches among tied teams;
3. Goals scored in head-to-head matches among tied teams;
4. If more than two teams are tied, and after applying all head-to-head criteria above, a subset of teams are still tied, all head-to-head criteria above are reapplied exclusively to this subset of teams;
5. Goal difference in all group matches;
6. Goals scored in all group matches;
7. Penalty shoot-out if only two teams are tied and they met in the last round of the group;
8. Disciplinary points (yellow card = 1 point, red card as a result of two yellow cards = 3 points, direct red card = 3 points, yellow card followed by direct red card = 4 points);
9. Drawing of lots.

All times are local, ICT (UTC+7).

=== Group A ===
Pos	Team	Pld	W	D	L	GF	GA	GD	Pts	Qualification
1	Iraq	5	5	0	0	25	10	+15	15	Knockout stage
2	Thailand (H)	5	4	0	1	30	10	+20	12	Knockout stage
3	Afghanistan	5	3	0	2	27	15	+12	9	
4	Malaysia	5	2	0	3	18	17	+1	6	
5	Bahrain	5	1	0	4	7	22	−15	3	
6	Brunei	5	0	0	5	8	41	−33	0	

Source: AFC
Rules for classification: Group stage tiebreakers
(H) Hosts
16 May 2017
15:00

Iraq	4–1	Bahrain
Saad 4', 30'; Dakheel 10'; Methaq 28'	Report	Eid 10' (pen.)

Bangkok Arena, Bangkok
Attendance: 80
Referee: Trương Quốc Dũng (Vietnam)
16 May 2017
17:00

Brunei	1–14	Afghanistan
Radhi 20'	Report	A. Jafari 4'; J. Haidari 7', 24', 25', 25', 31', 37'; H. Jafari 7'; Mahmoodi 11'; M. Haidari 26'; Samimi 29', 29'; Zada 36'; Ahmadi 40'

Bangkok Arena, Bangkok
Attendance: 380
Referee: Lee Po-fu (Chinese Taipei)
16 May 2017
19:00

Malaysia	2–5	Thailand
Saad 27'; Farikh 40'	Report	Tanachot 14'; Panat 21'; Muhammad 24'; Weerasak 40'; Jirasin 40'

Bangkok Arena, Bangkok
Attendance: 2,000
Referee: Nurdin Bukuev (Kyrgyzstan)

17 May 2017
15:00

Malaysia	1–4	Afghanistan
M. Haidari 31' (o.g.)	Report	J. Haidari 4'; H. Jafari 6', 15', 37'

Bangkok Arena, Bangkok
Attendance: 110
Referee: Takeshi Fujita (Japan)
17 May 2017
17:00

Iraq	6–1	Brunei
Methaq 4'; Aldeen 13', 40'; Riyadh 14'; Kadhim 20', 36'	Report	Abdulazim Z. 40'

Bangkok Arena, Bangkok
Attendance: 100
Referee: Liu Jianqiao (China)
17 May 2017
19:00

Thailand	4–0	Bahrain
Sarawut 19'; Muhammad 36'; Ronnachai 37', 39'	Report

Bangkok Arena, Bangkok
Attendance: 1,200
Referee: Khamis Al-Shamsi (United Arab Emirates)

18 May 2017
15:00

Bahrain	1–6	Malaysia
Saleem 34'	Report	Aidil 16'; Awalluddin 19', 20' (pen.), 28'; Amirul 26'; Nurasyraaf 31'

Bangkok Arena, Bangkok
Attendance: 40
Referee: Hiroyuki Harada (Japan)
18 May 2017
17:00

Afghanistan	3–4	Iraq
J. Haidari 4', 34'; A. Jafari 25'	Report	Methaq 6'; Kadhim 32', 32'; Dakheel 38'

Bangkok Arena, Bangkok
Attendance: 250
Referee: An Ran (China)
18 May 2017
19:00

Thailand	10–0	Brunei
Sarawut 6', 18', 36'; Jirayu 7'; Nazirul 17' (o.g.); Panat 28', 29'; Weerasak 29'; Muhammad 31'; Ronnachai 38'	Report

Bangkok Arena, Bangkok
Attendance: 2,000
Referee: Liu Jianqiao (China)

19 May 2017
15:00

Iraq	4–2	Malaysia
Methaq 5'; Kadhim 25'; Saad 26'; Fawzi 31'	Report	Hussein 22' (o.g.); Aidil 37'

Bangkok Arena, Bangkok
Attendance: 120
Referee: Liu Jianqiao (China)
19 May 2017
17:00

Brunei	3–4	Bahrain
Abdulazim B. 11'; Abdul 27'; Nazirul 37'	Report	Husain 2', 35'; Ahmed 12', 21'

Bangkok Arena, Bangkok
Attendance: 500
Referee: Vahid Arzpeyma Mohamareh (Iran)
19 May 2017
19:00

Afghanistan	1–8	Thailand
J. Haidari 11'	Report	Muhammad 16', 18', 23', 23'; Weerasak 17'; Witsanu 20'; Worrapluch 34', 40' (pen.)

Bangkok Arena, Bangkok
Attendance: 2,000
Referee: Mohamad Chami (Lebanon)

20 May 2017
15:00

Bahrain	1–5	Afghanistan
Ahmed 30'	Report	H. Jafari 6'; Ahmadi 21', 33'; Zadah 31'; Mahmoodi 40'

Bangkok Arena, Bangkok
Attendance: 200
Referee: Mahmoud Reza Nasirloo (Iran)
20 May 2017
17:00

Malaysia	7–3	Brunei
Awalluddin 9'; Aidil 18', 21'; Amirul 31', 37', 37'; Abdul 38' (o.g.)	Report	Nasy'rul 11', 38'; Nizamuddin 32'

Bangkok Arena, Bangkok
Attendance: 2,000
Referee: Takeshi Fujita (Japan)
20 May 2017
19:00

Thailand	3–7	Iraq
Panat 2'; Sarawut 25'; Jirasin 30'	Report	Haqi 1', 37', 40'; Dakheel 5', 28'; Fawzi 14'; Zameet 22'

Bangkok Arena, Bangkok
Attendance: 10,000
Referee: An Ran (China)

=== Group B ===
Pos	Team	Pld	W	D	L	GF	GA	GD	Pts	Qualification
1	Indonesia	4	2	2	0	15	9	+6	8 (Note: Indonesia and Japan finished with identical head-to-head and overall records, and drawing of lots was used to determine their rankings.)	Knockout stage
2	Japan	4	2	2	0	15	9	+6	8	Knockout stage
3	Vietnam	4	2	1	1	11	10	+1	7	
4	Tajikistan	4	1	1	2	16	14	+2	4	
5	Chinese Taipei	4	0	0	4	6	21	−15	0	

Source: AFC
Rules for classification: Group stage tiebreakers
Notes:
16 May 2017
15:00

Chinese Taipei	0–4	Japan
	Report	Nakamura 15'; Shimizu 25', 34'; Uematsu 38'

Indoor Stadium Huamark, Bangkok
Attendance: 150
Referee: Mohamad Chami (Lebanon)
16 May 2017
17:00

Indonesia	5–3	Tajikistan
Faishal 13'; Syauqi 23', 30'; Pangestu 28'; Rinaldi 38'	Report	Hamidov 4'; Vositzoda 12'; Kuziev 25'

Indoor Stadium Huamark, Bangkok
Attendance: 100
Referee: Hawkar Ahmed (Iraq)

17 May 2017
15:00

Tajikistan	2–4	Vietnam
Vositzoda 8'; Sardorov 24'	Report	Phạm Văn Nguyên 3'; Vũ Ngọc Lân 5'; Từ Vinh Quang 30'; Nguyễn Tuấn Thành 36'

Indoor Stadium Huamark, Bangkok
Attendance: 100
Referee: Azat Hajypolatov (Turkmenistan)
17 May 2017
17:00

Indonesia	6–2	Chinese Taipei
Syauqi 4', 9', 10', 13'; Rinaldi 33'; Pangestu 36'	Report	Lin Chih-hung 5' (pen.), 6'

Indoor Stadium Huamark, Bangkok
Attendance: 100
Referee: Ryan Shepherd (Australia)

18 May 2017
15:00

Vietnam	1–1	Indonesia
Dương Ngọc Linh 34'	Report	Eko 40'

Indoor Stadium Huamark, Bangkok
Attendance: 150
Referee: Hussain Ali Albahhar (Bahrain)
18 May 2017
17:00

Japan	5–5	Tajikistan
Yamada 14'; Uematsu 17'; Shimizu 23', 34'; Nakamura 40'	Report	Sardorov 1', 1', 36'; Sangov 16'; Bekmurodov 40'

Indoor Stadium Huamark, Bangkok
Attendance: 100
Referee: Ryan Shepherd (Australia)

19 May 2017
15:00

Japan	3–3	Indonesia
Yamada 13'; Okada 14'; Shimizu 34'	Report	Eko 9', 37', 40'

Indoor Stadium Huamark, Bangkok
Attendance: 100
Referee: Nurdin Bukuev (Kyrgyzstan)
19 May 2017
17:00

Chinese Taipei	4–5	Vietnam
Huang Chieh 6'; Lai Ming-hui 8'; Tan Wu-ling 10'; Lin Chih-hung 30'	Report	Dương Ngọc Linh 16'; Vũ Ngọc Lân 17'; Nguyễn Tuấn Thành 29'; Trần Nhật Trung 37', 40'

Indoor Stadium Huamark, Bangkok
Attendance: 150
Referee: Helday Idang (Malaysia)

20 May 2017
15:00

Tajikistan	6–0	Chinese Taipei
Kuziev 4', 23'; Sangov 20'; Halimov 36'; Bekmurodov 40'; Saidzoda 40'	Report

Indoor Stadium Huamark, Bangkok
Attendance: 100
Referee: Hussain Ali Albahhar (Bahrain)
20 May 2017
17:00

Vietnam	1–3	Japan
Dương Ngọc Linh 22'	Report	Shimizu 6'; Higuchi 12'; Nakamura 21'

Indoor Stadium Huamark, Bangkok
Attendance: 100
Referee: Anatoliy Rubakov (Uzbekistan)

=== Group C ===
Pos	Team	Pld	W	D	L	GF	GA	GD	Pts	Qualification
1	Uzbekistan	4	3	1	0	24	10	+14	10	Knockout stage
2	Lebanon	4	3	1	0	16	5	+11	10	Knockout stage
3	Hong Kong	4	2	0	2	8	13	−5	6	
4	Myanmar	4	1	0	3	7	16	−9	3	
5	Qatar	4	0	0	4	8	19	−11	0	

Source: AFC
Rules for classification: Group stage tiebreakers
16 May 2017
11:00

Lebanon	3–0	Qatar
Kouyoumjian 2'; Saber 12'; Al-Sadi 33' (o.g.)	Report

Bangkok Arena, Bangkok
Attendance: 30
Referee: Darius Turner (Australia)
16 May 2017
13:00

Hong Kong	2–1	Myanmar
Min Thu 21' (o.g.); Leung Sin Fung 40'	Report	Ye Lin Tun 11'

Bangkok Arena, Bangkok
Attendance: 120
Referee: Rey Ritaga (Philippines)

17 May 2017
11:00

Myanmar	0–5	Uzbekistan
	Report	Mirsharofov 15', 22', 32'; Khamroev 16'; Nishonov 23'

Bangkok Arena, Bangkok
Attendance: 50
Referee: Vahid Arzpeyma Mohamareh (Iran)
17 May 2017
13:00

Hong Kong	1–2	Lebanon
Liu Kin Po 40'	Report	Albaba 3'; Saber 7'

Bangkok Arena, Bangkok
Attendance: 5
Referee: Husein Mahmoud Husein Khalaileh (Jordan)

18 May 2017
11:00

Uzbekistan	8–2	Hong Kong
Khamroev 9', 21'; Usmonov 10', 20'; Nishonov 15'; Ismatullaev 26'; Rizaev 38'; Mukhammadiev 39' (pen.)	Report	Cheung Chak Wai 12'; Liu Kin Po 12'

Bangkok Arena, Bangkok
Attendance: 20
Referee: Khamis Al Shamsi (United Arab Emirates)
18 May 2017
13:00

Qatar	2–6	Myanmar
Al-Hanaei 22'; Al-Jalham 24'	Report	Shine Htet Aung 5', 36'; Htet Wai Thein 11'; Pyae Phyo Maung 23'; Ye Lin Tun 33'; Min Thu 40'

Bangkok Arena, Bangkok
Attendance: 60
Referee: Azat Hajypolatov (Turkmenistan)

19 May 2017
11:00

Qatar	2–3	Hong Kong
Abusharida 21'; Al-Balushi 39'	Report	Cheung Chak Wai 17'; Liu Kin Po 27', 38'

Bangkok Arena, Bangkok
Attendance: 45
Referee: Hasan Al-Gburi (Iraq)
19 May 2017
13:00

Lebanon	4–4	Uzbekistan
El Khoury 12'; Koukezian 17', 38'; Albaba 18'	Report	Saber 15' (o.g.); Usmonov 17'; Nishonov 25'; Ismatullaev 31'

Bangkok Arena, Bangkok
Attendance: 40
Referee: Hawkar Ahmed (Iraq)

20 May 2017
11:00

Myanmar	0–7	Lebanon
	Report	Hammoud 13'; Alame 20'; El Khoury 24'; Ye Lin Tun 32' (o.g.); Kouyoumjian 35', 35'; Selwan 35' (pen.)

Bangkok Arena, Bangkok
Attendance: 25
Referee: Azat Hajypoulatov (Turkmenistan)
20 May 2017
13:00

Uzbekistan	7–4	Qatar
Usmonov 3', 22', 22', 27'; Rizaev 11'; Erkinov 11'; Ismatullaev 14'	Report	Al-Jalham 20' (pen.); Guleid 23'; Al-Hashemi 37', 39'

Bangkok Arena, Bangkok
Attendance: 60
Referee: Lee Po-fu (Chinese Taipei)

=== Group D ===
Pos	Team	Pld	W	D	L	GF	GA	GD	Pts	Qualification
1	Iran	4	4	0	0	27	2	+25	12	Knockout stage
2	Mongolia	4	2	1	1	10	12	−2	7	Knockout stage
3	United Arab Emirates	4	2	0	2	11	14	−3	6	
4	Kyrgyzstan	4	0	2	2	8	19	−11	2	
5	China	4	0	1	3	6	15	−9	1	

Source: AFC
Rules for classification: Group stage tiebreakers
16 May 2017
11:00

China	3–3	Kyrgyzstan
Paiheierding 12'; Xu Guanbin 12'; Wang Jiahao 27'	Report	Isakov 1'; Tursunov 2'; Zholdoshov 30'

Indoor Stadium Huamark, Bangkok
Attendance: 100
Referee: Hasan Al-Gburi (Iraq)
16 May 2017
13:00

United Arab Emirates	3–5	Mongolia
Al-Marashda 3', 16'; Al-Salami 38'	Report	Altansukh 13', 22'; Battulga 20', 24'; Erdenebat 38'

Indoor Stadium Huamark, Bangkok
Attendance: 100
Referee: Helday Idang (Malaysia)

17 May 2017
11:00

Mongolia	0–6	Iran
	Report	Taheri 7'; Rezapour 11', 20'; Lotfi 13'; Kadkhoda 16'; M. Karimi 30'

Indoor Stadium Huamark, Bangkok
Attendance: 100
Referee: Osama Saeed Idrees (Bahrain)
17 May 2017
13:00

United Arab Emirates	3–1	China
S. Al-Zaabi 23'; Al-Salami 25'; Salim 36'	Report	Wang Jiahao 18'

Indoor Stadium Huamark, Bangkok
Attendance: 100
Referee: Anatoliy Rubakov (Uzbekistan)

18 May 2017
11:00

Iran	5–1	United Arab Emirates
Kadkhoda 5', 37'; M. Karimi 24'; Ghahramani 25', 36'	Report	Al-Salami 30'

Indoor Stadium Huamark, Bangkok
Attendance: 100
Referee: Kim Jong-hee (South Korea)
18 May 2017
13:00

Kyrgyzstan	2–2	Mongolia
Zholdubaev 18', 40'	Report	Ganzorig 13'; Altansukh 38'

Indoor Stadium Huamark, Bangkok
Attendance: 100
Referee: Yuttakon Maiket (Thailand)

19 May 2017
11:00

Kyrgyzstan	3–4	United Arab Emirates
Tashtanov 1'; Zholdoshov 22'; Zholdubaev 36'	Report	Al-Hayas 17'; Al-Marashda 19'; Al-Salami 32'; H. Al-Zaabi 40'

Indoor Stadium Huamark, Bangkok
Attendance: 100
Referee: Trương Quốc Dũng (Vietnam)
19 May 2017
13:00

China	1–6	Iran
Wang Jiahao 34'	Report	Zhou Xu 5' (o.g.); Jame 15'; Taheri 19'; H. Karimi 33'; Heidari 36'; Ghahramani 40'

Indoor Stadium Huamark, Bangkok
Attendance: 150
Referee: Husein Khalaileh (Jordan)

20 May 2017
11:00

Mongolia	3–1	China
Oyunbileg 5'; Altansukh 6'; Battulga 34'	Report	Zou Lei 2'

Indoor Stadium Huamark, Bangkok
Attendance: 100
Referee: Osama Saeed Idrees (Bahrain)
20 May 2017
13:00

Iran	10–0	Kyrgyzstan
Kadkhoda 7', 20'; Jame 7'; Ghahramani 8'; M. Karimi 15'; H. Karimi 26', 27'; Khani 34'; Taheri 40'	Report

Indoor Stadium Huamark, Bangkok
Attendance: 100
Referee: Kim Jong-hee (South Korea)

== Knockout stage ==
In the knockout stage, extra time and penalty shoot-out were used to decide the winner if necessary, except for the third place match where penalty shoot-out (no extra time) was used to decide the winner if necessary (Regulations Articles 14.1 and 15.1).

=== Bracket ===
Quarter-finals
22 May – Bangkok Arena
Indonesia	2
Thailand	4
22 May – Indoor Stadium Huamark
Iran	6
Lebanon	2
22 May – Bangkok Arena
Iraq	1
Japan	0
22 May – Indoor Stadium Huamark
Uzbekistan (a.e.t.)	10
Mongolia	7

Semi-finals
24 May – Bangkok Arena
Thailand	5
Iran (a.e.t.)	7
24 May – Bangkok Arena
Iraq	5
Uzbekistan	1

Final
26 May – Bangkok Arena
Iran	2
Iraq	0
Third place
25 May – Bangkok Arena
Thailand	8
Uzbekistan	1

=== Quarter-finals ===
22 May 2017
16:00

Indonesia	2–4	Thailand
Eko 21'; Rinaldi 34'	Report	Nugroho 4' (o.g.); Weerasak 11'; Tanachot 37'; Panat 40'

Bangkok Arena, Bangkok
Attendance: 2,800
Referee: Rey Ritaga (Philippines)

22 May 2017
16:00

Iran	6–2	Lebanon
Khani 5'; Kadkhoda 9'; Lotfi 15', 35'; Albaba 19' (o.g.); Taheri 29'	Report	Albaba 4'; Koukezian 34'

Indoor Stadium Huamark, Bangkok
Attendance: 100
Referee: Liu Jianqiao (China)

22 May 2017
19:00

Iraq	1–0	Japan
Zameet 19'	Report

Bangkok Arena, Bangkok
Attendance: 2,000
Referee: Nurdin Bukuev (Kyrgyzstan)

22 May 2017
19:00

Uzbekistan	10–7 (a.e.t.)	Mongolia
Erkinov 10'; Usmonov 10', 17', 47', 48', 49', 50'; Nishonov 11'; Rizaev 12'; Mirsharofov 37'	Report	Altansukh 7'; Battulga 8'; Erdenebat 11'; Ganzorig 16', 35'; Rizaev 33' (o.g.); Oyunbileg 46'

Indoor Stadium Huamark, Bangkok
Attendance: 150
Referee: Khamis Al-Shamsi (United Arab Emirates)

=== Semi-finals ===
Winners qualified for 2018 Summer Youth Olympics boys' futsal tournament, to be represented by their under-18 representative teams.

24 May 2017
16:00

Thailand	5–7 (a.e.t.)	Iran
Panat 1', 10', 48'; Worrapluch 40'; Muhammad 45'	Report	Lotfi 2', 43', 47'; Taheri 12'; Jame 39'; H. Karimi 46'; Kadkhoda 50'

Bangkok Arena, Bangkok
Attendance: 8,500
Referee: Trương Quốc Dũng (Vietnam)

24 May 2017
19:00

Iraq	5–1	Uzbekistan
Hussein 15', 24'; Dakheel 23'; Methaq 32'; Mukhammadiev 38' (o.g.)	Report	Mukhammadiev 31'

Bangkok Arena, Bangkok
Attendance: 500
Referee: Ryan Shepherd (Australia)

=== Third place match ===
25 May 2017
19:30

Thailand	8–1	Uzbekistan
Muhammad 1'; Weerasak 3'; Witsanu 12', 20'; Panat 21'; Tanachot 25'; Sarawut 26'; Ronnachai 31'	Report	Ismatullaev 32'

Bangkok Arena, Bangkok
Attendance: 6,500
Referee: Mohamad Chami (Lebanon)

=== Final ===
26 May 2017
19:30

Iran	2–0	Iraq
Rezapour 4'; Ali 10' (o.g.)	Report

Bangkok Arena, Bangkok
Attendance: 1,000
Referee: Nurdin Bukuev (Kyrgyzstan)

== Winners ==
2017 AFC U-20 Futsal Championship winners

Iran
First title

== Qualified teams for Youth Olympics ==
The following two teams from AFC qualified for the 2018 Summer Youth Olympics boys' futsal tournament.

Team	Qualified on	Previous appearances in Youth Olympics
Iran	24 May 2017	0 (debut)
Iraq	24 May 2017	0 (debut)

Notes

- Since teams from the same association cannot play in both the Youth Olympics boys' and girls' tournaments, if teams from the same association qualify for both tournaments, they must nominate their preferred qualification team, and the next best ranked team will qualify instead if one of the qualified teams are not nominated.
- As participation in team sports (Futsal, Beach handball, Field hockey, and Rugby sevens) are limited to one team per gender for each National Olympic Committee (NOC), the participating teams of the 2018 Youth Olympics futsal tournament will be confirmed by mid-2018 after each qualified NOC confirms their participation and any unused qualification places are reallocated.

== Awards ==
The following awards were given at the conclusion of the tournament:

Top Goalscorer	Most Valuable Player	Fair Play award
(Uzbekistan) Akbar Usmonov	(Iran) Touhid Lotfi	Thailand

== Goalscorers ==
13 goals

- (Uzbekistan) Akbar Usmonov

10 goals

- (Afghanistan) Jawad Haidari

9 goals

- (Thailand) Muhammad Osamanmusa
- (Thailand) Panat Kittipanuwong

7 goals

- (Iran) Hamzeh Kadkhoda

6 goals

- (Indonesia) Syauqi Saud
- (Iran) Touhid Lotfi
- (Japan) Kazuya Shimizu
- (Thailand) Sarawut Phalaphruek

5 goals

- (Afghanistan) Hassan Ali Jafari
- (Indonesia) Samuel Eko
- (Iran) Mohammad Taheri
- (Iraq) Abbas Dakheel
- (Iraq) Hasan Kadhim
- (Iraq) Fahad Methaq
- (Mongolia) Temüüjin Altansukh
- (Thailand) Weerasak Srichai

4 goals

- (Hong Kong) Liu Kin Po
- (Iran) Hamid Ghahramani
- (Iran) Hamidreza Karimi
- (Malaysia) Awalluddin Nawi
- (Malaysia) Aidil Shahril
- (Malaysia) Amirul Sugito
- (Mongolia) Batbaatar Battulga
- (Tajikistan) Fayzali Sardorov
- (Thailand) Ronnachai Jungwongsuk
- (United Arab Emirates) Abdulla Al-Salami
- (Uzbekistan) Ravshan Ismatullaev
- (Uzbekistan) Said Mirsharofov
- (Uzbekistan) Khusniddin Nishonov

3 goals

- (Afghanistan) Abbas Ahmadi
- (Bahrain) Sadeq Ahmed
- (China) Wang Jiahao
- (Chinese Taipei) Lin Chih-hung
- (Indonesia) Arjuna Rinaldi
- (Iran) Mohammad Jame
- (Iran) Mahdi Karimi
- (Iran) Sahand Rezapour
- (Iraq) Ali Haqi
- (Iraq) Ali Saad
- (Japan) Mitsuru Nakamura
- (Kyrgyzstan) Mirlan Zholdubaev
- (Lebanon) Hussein Albaba
- (Lebanon) Steve Koukezian
- (Lebanon) Serge Kouyoumjian
- (Mongolia) Tsolmonbaatar Ganzorig
- (Tajikistan) Umed Kuziev
- (Thailand) Worrapluch Jiwjaratrong
- (Thailand) Witsanu Meemakbang
- (Thailand) Tanachot Sosawaeng
- (United Arab Emirates) Saeed Al-Marashda
- (Uzbekistan) Ilkhomjon Khamroev
- (Uzbekistan) Botirbek Rizaev
- (Vietnam) Dương Ngọc Linh

2 goals

- (Afghanistan) Ali Jafari
- (Afghanistan) Farzad Mahmoodi
- (Afghanistan) Wahid Samimi
- (Bahrain) Ali Husain
- (Brunei) Nasy'rul Wafiy
- (Hong Kong) Cheung Chak Wai
- (Indonesia) Rio Pangestu
- (Iran) Mohammad Heidari
- (Iran) Omid Khani
- (Iraq) Muheb Aldeen
- (Iraq) Moamin Fawzi
- (Iraq) Ali Hussein
- (Iraq) Hamzah Zameet
- (Japan) Koto Uematsu
- (Japan) Jiei Yamada
- (Kyrgyzstan) Mamatziia Zholdoshov
- (Lebanon) Georgio El Khoury
- (Lebanon) Michel Saber
- (Mongolia) Bat-Orgil Erdenebat
- (Mongolia) Yesukhei Oyunbileg
- (Myanmar) Shine Htet Aung
- (Myanmar) Ye Lin Tun
- (Qatar) Hamad Al-Hashemi
- (Qatar) Ahmed Al-Jalham
- (Tajikistan) Firuz Bekmurodov
- (Tajikistan) Firuz Sangov
- (Tajikistan) Iqboli Vositzoda
- (Thailand) Jirasin Kimseng
- (Uzbekistan) Khushnur Erkinov
- (Uzbekistan) Asli Mukhammadiev
- (Vietnam) Nguyễn Tuấn Thành
- (Vietnam) Trần Nhật Trung
- (Vietnam) Vũ Ngọc Lân

1 goal

- (Afghanistan) Morteza Haidari
- (Afghanistan) Morteza Sharif Zada
- (Afghanistan) Hosain Zadah
- (Bahrain) Mohamed Eid
- (Bahrain) Mohamed Saleem
- (Brunei) Abdulazim Boll
- (Brunei) Nazirul Haziq
- (Brunei) Nizamuddin Ismail
- (Brunei) Abdul Khaaliq
- (Brunei) Radhi Raduan
- (Brunei) Abdulazim Zaini
- (China) Paiheierding Tudahong
- (China) Xu Guanbin
- (China) Zou Lei
- (Chinese Taipei) Huang Chieh
- (Chinese Taipei) Lai Ming-hui
- (Chinese Taipei) Tan Wu-ling
- (Hong Kong) Leung Sin Fung
- (Indonesia) Faishal Ammar
- (Iraq) Ghaith Riyadh
- (Japan) Takeshi Higuchi
- (Japan) Shokei Okada
- (Kyrgyzstan) Damir Isakov
- (Kyrgyzstan) Aktai Tashtanov
- (Kyrgyzstan) Arstanbek Tursunov
- (Lebanon) Hassan Alame
- (Lebanon) Mouhammad Hammoud
- (Lebanon) Jamal Selwan
- (Malaysia) Nurasyraaf Azle
- (Malaysia) Farikh Rahman
- (Malaysia) Saad Abdul Sani
- (Myanmar) Htet Wai Thein
- (Myanmar) Min Thu
- (Myanmar) Pyae Phyo Maung
- (Qatar) Obaid Abusharida
- (Qatar) Salim Al-Balushi
- (Qatar) Khalid Al-Hanaei
- (Qatar) Abdulla Guleid
- (Tajikistan) Shavqat Halimov
- (Tajikistan) Shohrukh Hamidov
- (Tajikistan) Somon Saidzoda
- (Thailand) Jirayu Sam Twigg
- (United Arab Emirates) Abdalla Al-Hayas
- (United Arab Emirates) Humaid Al-Zaabi
- (United Arab Emirates) Sultan Al-Zaabi
- (United Arab Emirates) Hamad Salim
- (Vietnam) Phạm Văn Nguyên
- (Vietnam) Từ Vinh Quang

1 own goal

- (Afghanistan) Morteza Haidari (against Malaysia)
- (Brunei) Nazirul Haziq (against Thailand)
- (Brunei) Abdul Khaaliq (against Malaysia)
- (China) Zhou Xu (against Iran)
- (Indonesia) Anton Nugroho (against Thailand)
- (Iraq) Zaid Ali (against Iran)
- (Iraq) Ali Hussein (against Malaysia)
- (Lebanon) Hussein Albaba (against Iran)
- (Lebanon) Michel Saber (against Uzbekistan)
- (Myanmar) Min Thu (against Hong Kong)
- (Myanmar) Ye Lin Tun (against Lebanon)
- (Qatar) Jassim Al-Sadi (against Lebanon)
- (Uzbekistan) Asli Mukhammadiev (against Iraq)
- (Uzbekistan) Botirbek Rizaev (against Mongolia)

== Broadcasting rights ==
Territory	Channel	Ref
Indonesia	MNCTV	
Thailand	BBTV CH7	

== See also ==
- 2018 AFC Women's Futsal Championship
- Futsal at the 2018 Summer Youth Olympics
