= Thailand national under-20 futsal team =

Thailand Under-20
- Nickname(s): โต๊ะเล็ก (The Small Table)
- Association: Football Association of Thailand
- Confederation: AFC (Asia)
- Head coach: Pulpis
- Home stadium: Bangkok Futsal Arena
- FIFA code: THA
Home colours	Away colours	Third colours

AFC U-20 Futsal Championship
- Appearances: 1 (First in 2017)
- Best result: Third-placed (2017)

ASEAN Championship
- Appearances: 1 (First in 2025)
- Best result: Champion (2025)

The Thailand national under-20 futsal team for under 20 level represents Thailand in international futsal competitions and is controlled by the Futsal Commission of the Football Association of Thailand.

== Nickname ==
Thailand national under-20 futsal team was dubbed by the medias and supporters as "Toh-Lek" (Thai: โต๊ะเล็ก lit. small table ) or "Toh-Lek-Team-Chad-Thai" (Thai: โต๊ะเล็กทีมชาติไทย lit. Thai national small table ) for more specific.

Toh-Lek or The Small Table itself is the general slang term to call the Futsal as the sport in Thailand. Thai language adopts the original word Futsal (Thai: ฟุตซอล) and uses it to call the kind of sport. However, Thai people also commonly refer to it as Toh-Lek since it represents the game of football that plays on a smaller field. The Small Table has slowly become the alias of Thailand national under-20 futsal team.

== Home stadiums ==
Thailand plays the home games at the Bangkok Futsal Arena with a capacity of 12,000 spectators and the Indoor Stadium Huamark with a capacity of 10,000 spectators.

Nong Chok	Bangkok Metropolis	Bang Kapi
Bangkok Arena	Bangkok Metropolis	Indoor Stadium Huamark
Capacity: 12,000	Bangkok Metropolis	Capacity: 10,000
	Thailand national under-20 futsal team (Bangkok)	

== Results and fixtures ==
=== All time results ===
Win Draw Loss

Recent results within last 12 months and upcoming fixtures.

== Players ==
=== Current squad ===
The following 14 players were called up for the 2017 AFC U-20 Futsal Championship in Thailand between 16 and 26 May 2017.

Manager	(Spain) Miguel Rodrigo

The following players were called up:

No.	Pos.	Player	Date of birth (age)	Caps	Club
1	GK	Jaroenpong Prasansat			(Thailand) Surasakmontree School
3	GK	Wutthichai Yaemprakhon			(Thailand) Sisaket
4	GK	Phanudet Siribarn			(Thailand) Bangkok BTS
2	FP	Panat Kittipanuwong	14 May 1998 (age 28)		(Thailand) Chonburi Bluewave
5	FP	Tanachot Sosawaeng			(Thailand) Bangkok BTS
6	FP	Weerasak Srichai			(Thailand) Highway Department
7	FP	Worrapluch Jiwjaratwong			(Thailand) Kasem Bundit
8	FP	Jirasin Kimseng (c)			(Thailand) Chonburi Bluewave
9	FP	Sarawut Phalaphruek			(Thailand) Highway Department
10	FP	Ananwat Supudom			(Thailand) Nakhon Ratchasima
11	FP	Muhammad Osamanmusa	19 January 1998 (age 28)		(Thailand) Bangkok BTS
12	FP	Ronnachai Juwongsuk			(Thailand) Chonburi Bluewave
13	FP	Sam Twigg	18 August 1998 (age 28)		(New Zealand) Eastern Suburbs
14	FP	Witsanu Meemakbang			(Thailand) Nonthaburi

== Coaches history ==
Nation	Coaches	Year	Ref.
Spain	Miguel Rodrigo	2016–	
