= Japan national under-20 futsal team =

Japanese sports team

Japan Under-20
- Association: JFA
- Confederation: AFC
- Head coach: Kenichiro Kogure
- FIFA code: JPN

AFC U-20 Futsal Asian Cup
- Appearances: 2 (First in 2017)
- Best result: Champions (2019)

The Japan national under-20 futsal team represents Japan in international under-20 level futsal competitions and is controlled by the Futsal Commission of the Japan Football Association.

== Results and fixtures ==
Legend

Win Draw Lose Fixture

== Coaching staff ==
=== Current coaching staff ===
As of 24 June 2022

Role	Name
Head coach	(Japan) Kenichiro Kogure
Assistant coach	(Japan) Kensuke Takahashi
Goalkeeping coach	(Japan) Keitaro Uchiyama
Physical coach	(Japan) Toru Sato

== Players ==
=== Current squad ===
The following players were called up for the F.League Ocean Cup, held in May 2023.

No.	Pos.	Player	Date of birth (age)	Club
1	GK	Robin Monobe	7 April 2004 (age 22)	(Japan Football Association) Nagoya Oceans Satellite
2	GK	Yuto Irie	22 April 2005 (age 21)	(Japan Football Association) Fugador Sumida Falcons
3	FP	Soya Kimura		(Japan Football Association) Pescadola Machida U-18
4	FP	Kohei Habu	7 November 2007 (age 18)	(Japan Football Association) Fugador Sumida Falcons
5	FP	Masafumi Yamashita		(Japan Football Association) Nagoya Oceans Satellite
6	FP	Ryuji Izu	28 July 2004 (age 22)	(Japan Football Association) Nagoya Oceans Satellite
7	FP	Misaki Asano	16 August 2005 (age 21)	(Japan Football Association) Seiwa Gakuen High School
8	FP	Shumpei Aoshima		(Japan Football Association) Pescadola Machida U-18
9	FP	Ryunosuke Sobue		(Japan Football Association) Pescadola Machida U-18
10	FP	Ryoga Kasuga	15 August 2005 (age 21)	(Japan Football Association) Fugador Sumida Falcons
11	FP	Kensuke Kamano		(Japan Football Association) Shonan Bellmare FS Londrina
13	FP	Taiki Suzuki		(Japan Football Association) Osaka Seikei University
14	FP	Kyo Katayama		(Japan Football Association) Shonan Bellmare FS Londrina
15	FP	Shumpei Miyata	10 March 2006 (age 20)	(Japan Football Association) Fugador Sumida Falcons

== See also ==
- Sport in Japan
  - Futsal in Japan
- Japan Football Association (JFA)

National teams
Men's

- National futsal team

Women's

- National futsal team
