= 2023 FIFA Women's World Cup =

Football championship

Ipu Wahine o te Ao Whīwha i 2023 (Māori)

Tournament details
- Host countries: Australia; New Zealand
- Dates: 20 July – 20 August
- Teams: 32 (from 6 confederations)
- Venues: 10 (in 9 host cities)

Final positions
- Champions: Spain (1st title)
- Runners-up: England
- Third place: Sweden
- Fourth place: Australia

Tournament statistics
- Matches played: 64
- Goals scored: 164 (2.56 per match)
- Attendance: 1,978,274 (30,911 per match)
- Top scorer(s): (Japan) Hinata Miyazawa (5 goals)
- Best player: (Spain) Aitana Bonmatí
- Best young player: (Spain) Salma Paralluelo
- Best goalkeeper: (England) Mary Earps
- Fair play award: Japan

The 2023 FIFA Women's World Cup was the ninth edition of the FIFA Women's World Cup, the quadrennial international women's football championship contested by women's national teams and organised by FIFA. The tournament, which took place from 20 July to 20 August 2023, was jointly hosted by Australia and New Zealand. It was the first FIFA Women's World Cup with more than one host nation, as well as the first World Cup to be held across multiple confederations, as Australia is a member of the Asian Football Confederation, while New Zealand is a member of the Oceania Football Confederation. It was also the first Women's World Cup to be held in the Southern Hemisphere.

This tournament was the first to feature an expanded format of 32 teams, from the previous 24. The opening match was won by co-host New Zealand, beating Norway at Eden Park in Auckland on 20 July 2023 and achieving their first Women's World Cup victory.

Spain was crowned champions after defeating reigning European champions England 1–0 in the final. It was the first time a European nation had won the Women's World Cup since 2007, although their victory was marred by the Rubiales affair. Spain became the second nation to win both the women's and men's World Cup since Germany in the 2003 edition. In addition, they became the first nation to concurrently hold the FIFA women's U-17, U-20, and senior World Cups. Sweden would claim their fourth third place finish at the Women's World Cup while co-host Australia achieved their best placing yet, finishing fourth. Japanese player Hinata Miyazawa won the Golden Boot scoring five goals throughout the tournament. Spanish player Aitana Bonmatí was voted the tournament's best player, winning the Golden Ball, whilst Bonmatí's teammate Salma Paralluelo was awarded the Young Player Award. England goalkeeper Mary Earps won the Golden Glove, awarded to the best-performing goalkeeper of the tournament.

== Overview ==
The FIFA Women's World Cup is a professional association football (soccer) tournament contested by senior women's national football teams, organised by FIFA. The tournament, held every four years and one year after the men's World Cup, was first played in 1991 in China, and was expanded to 32 teams beginning with the 2023 edition. The tournament is contested with eight round-robin groups followed by a knockout round for 16 teams. The defending champions were the United States, who defeated the Netherlands 2–0 in the 2019 final. The event took place over a period of a month, from 20 July to 20 August, in Australia and New Zealand. This Women's World Cup was the first co-hosted tournament, and also the first senior World Cup to be held across multiple confederations. In addition, it was the first senior tournament to be held in Oceania, the first Women's World Cup in the Southern Hemisphere, and the third to be held in the Asia-Pacific region, after 1991 and 2007.

=== Schedule ===
The match schedule was announced by FIFA on 1 December 2021, with kick-off times confirmed on 24 October 2022, two days after the final draw.

The opening match of the tournament, between co-host New Zealand and Norway, was played on 20 July 2023 at Eden Park. The inaugural match played in Australia, was between Australia playing against the Republic of Ireland on the same day at Stadium Australia, after a venue change due to strong ticketing demand.

=== Prize money ===
The total prize pool was USD 110 million, $80 million greater than the prize pool of the previous tournament.

At previous tournaments, FIFA paid total prize money to the national associations, but for the 2023 Women's World Cup it was set to award prize payments directly to players as well as the associations. This came as a result of reports in the women's game that a number of national associations were withholding competition prize money from players and/or not paying them at all. In March 2023, global player union FIFPRO sent a letter signed by players from around the world to FIFA, challenging FIFA to make prize money in the men's and women's tournaments equal and to ensure at least 30% of prize money in the women's tournament made it to the players. While FIFA did not match the prize money of the men's tournament, it did significantly increase it, with more than half set to be paid to players directly.

Just before the tournament, FIFA president Gianni Infantino announced that the player payments would still be paid to the associations, and that FIFA planned to audit the associations to make sure the money got to the players. Football administrator Lise Klaveness expressed concern over what she felt sounded like reneging on the promise, both for the players and for FIFA's credibility. During the tournament, Infantino admitted that FIFA had simply made recommendations to associations on how much to pay players, and they could not reasonably check.

Place	Teams	Amount (in U.S. dollars)		
Place	Teams	Per association	Per player *	Total
Champions	1	$4,290,000	$270,000	$10,500,000
Runners-up	1	$3,015,000	$195,000	$7,500,000
Third place	1	$2,610,000	$180,000	$6,750,000
Fourth place	1	$2,455,000	$165,000	$6,250,000
5th–8th place (quarter-finals)	4	$2,180,000	$90,000	$17,000,000
9th–16th place (round of 16)	8	$1,870,000	$60,000	$26,000,000
17th–32nd place (group stage)	16	$1,560,000	$30,000	$36,000,000
Total	32	$110,000,000		

== Host selection ==
Bidding began for the 2023 FIFA Women's World Cup on 19 February 2019. Member associations interested in hosting the tournament had to submit a declaration of interest by 15 March, and provide the completed bidding registration by 16 April. However, FIFA revised the bidding timeline as the tournament expanded to 32 teams on 31 July. Other member associations interested in hosting the tournament then had until 16 August to submit a declaration of interest, while the completed bidding registration of new member associations and re-confirmation of prior bidders was due by 2 September.

Nine countries initially indicated interest in hosting the events: Argentina, Australia, Bolivia, Brazil, Colombia, Japan, South Korea (with interest in a joint bid with North Korea), New Zealand and South Africa. Belgium expressed interest in hosting the tournament following the new deadline but later dropped out, as did Bolivia, in September 2019. Australia and New Zealand later announced they would merge their bids in a joint submission. Brazil, Colombia, and Japan joined them in submitting their bid books to FIFA by 13 December. However, both Brazil and Japan later withdrew their bids in June 2020 before the final voting.

On 25 June 2020, Australia and New Zealand won the bid to host the Women's World Cup. The decision came after a vote by the FIFA Council, with the winning bid earning 22 votes, while Colombia earned 13. Neither country had previously hosted a senior FIFA tournament. This was the first Women's World Cup to be hosted in multiple countries, and only the second World Cup tournament to do so, following the 2002 FIFA World Cup, held in Japan and South Korea. It was also the first FIFA Women's World Cup to be held in the Southern Hemisphere, the first senior FIFA tournament to be held in Oceania, and the first FIFA tournament to be hosted across multiple confederations (with Australia in the AFC and New Zealand in the OFC). Australia became the second association from the AFC to host the Women's World Cup, after China in both 1991 and 2007.

2023 FIFA WWC bidding
Bidding nation(s)	Votes
Bidding nation(s)	Round 1
Australia & New Zealand	22
Colombia	13
Recused	2
Total votes	35
Majority required	18

== Format ==
In July 2019, Infantino proposed an expansion of the Women's World Cup from 24 to 32 teams, starting with the 2023 edition, and doubling the tournament's prize money. The proposal came following the success of the 2019 FIFA Women's World Cup and the prior edition of the tournament in 2015, which after increasing from 16 to 24 teams set an attendance record for all FIFA competitions besides the men's FIFA World Cup. Expanding the tournament to allow eight additional participating teams gave more member associations a greater opportunity to qualify for the final tournament. This fostered the growing reach and professionalisation of the women's game.

On 31 July, the FIFA Council unanimously decided to expand the tournament to 32 teams, featuring eight groups of four.

The astounding success of this year's FIFA Women's World Cup in France made it very clear that this is the time to keep the momentum going and take concrete steps to foster the growth of women's football. I am glad to see this proposal becoming a reality.

— FIFA President, Gianni Infantino.

The tournament opened with a group stage consisting of eight groups of four teams, with the top two teams progressing from each group to a knockout tournament featuring 16 teams. The number of games played overall increased from 52 to 64. The tournament replicated the format of the men's FIFA World Cup used between 1998 and 2022. For the first time since the 2002 FIFA World Cup, both qualified teams from each group were kept on the same side of the draw in the knockout stage, meaning they would meet again in the semi-final instead of the final if they advanced that far. This was to minimize travel between Australia and New Zealand and to ensure both host nations remained in their own country up to the semi-finals should they qualify.

== Venues ==
Australia and New Zealand proposed 13 possible venues across 12 host cities for the tournament in the bid book submitted to FIFA, suggesting a minimum of 10 stadiums be used—5 in each country. The original proposal of the joint bid would have seen the venues divided into three main travel hubs: South Hub, containing Perth, Adelaide, Launceston and Melbourne; East Hub, containing Brisbane, Newcastle, Sydney, Melbourne and Launceston; and New Zealand Hub, containing Auckland, Hamilton, Wellington, Christchurch and Dunedin. The Sydney Football Stadium was the only new stadium, undergoing a major renovation during the bid period, replacing the old football stadium on the same site and opening on 28 August 2022.

The bid evaluation was released on 10 June 2020 by FIFA, which noted that the majority of the stadiums listed in the bid meet FIFA's hosting requirements with capacity, aside from Adelaide and Auckland, which did not meet the minimum requirements capacity wise for stages of the competition proposed for. Most stadiums featured in the bid were planned to have minor renovations with new floodlighting, pitch renovations, in addition to gender-neutral changing rooms in time for the tournament.

On 31 March 2021, FIFA announced the final host city and venue selections. Five cities and six stadiums were used in Australia, along with four cities and stadiums in New Zealand. From the proposed venues, Newcastle and Launceston were not selected in Australia and Christchurch was omitted in New Zealand. Eden Park in Auckland hosted the opening game, with Stadium Australia in Sydney hosting the final match. As a part of the branding, all cities used native names (Indigenous in Australia and Māori in New Zealand) alongside their English names in an effort to "reconcile and respect the original owners of the land". They were: Tarntanya (Adelaide), Meanjin (written as Meaanjin; Brisbane), Naarm (Melbourne), Boorloo (Perth), Gadigal (Eastern Sydney; for Sydney Football Stadium), Wangal (Western Sydney; for Stadium Australia), Tāmaki Makaurau (Auckland), Ōtepoti (Dunedin), Kirikiriroa (Hamilton), and Te Whanganui-a-Tara (Wellington).

Eden Park, Auckland hosted New Zealand's opening match; Stadium Australia, Sydney hosted Australia's opening match (both group stages). Lang Park, Brisbane, hosted the third-place match on 19 August; Stadium Australia hosted the final which was held on 20 August.

The Women's World Cup forced many domestic Australian sporting teams to move matches from grounds under the FIFA lockout, particularly those in the National Rugby League.

Australia			New Zealand	
Sydney		Brisbane	Auckland	Wellington
Stadium Australia	Sydney Football Stadium	Lang Park (Brisbane Stadium)	Eden Park	Wellington Regional Stadium
Capacity: 75,784	Capacity: 40,583	Capacity: 49,461	Capacity: 43,217	Capacity: 33,132
Melbourne	Perth	Adelaide	Dunedin	Hamilton
Melbourne Rectangular Stadium	Perth Rectangular Stadium	Hindmarsh Stadium	Forsyth Barr Stadium (Dunedin Stadium)	Waikato Stadium
Capacity: 27,706	Capacity: 18,727	Capacity: 13,557	Capacity: 25,947	Capacity: 18,009

Team base camps

Base camps were used by the 32 national squads to stay and train before and during the Women's World Cup tournament. FIFA announced the hotels and training sites for the 29 qualified participating nations on 11 December 2022, with the remaining 3 qualified teams selecting their base camps after the Play-off Tournament. FIFA later confirmed the last remaining three base camps for the play-off tournament winners on 21 March 2023. It was the first World Cup to have dedicated base camps for the 32 participating nations.

Team	Hotel	Training site
Argentina	Novotel Auckland – Ellerslie	Michaels Avenue Reserve, Auckland
Australia	Rydges Brisbane – South Bank	Queensland Sport and Athletics Centre
Brazil	Best Western Hotel North Lakes	Moreton Bay Central Sports Complex
Canada	Mercure Melbourne – Doncaster	Olympic Park, Heidelberg West
China	Pullman Adelaide	Croatian Sports Centre, Adelaide
Colombia	Mercure Sydney – Liverpool	Marconi Stadium
Costa Rica	Distinction Christchurch Hotel	Ngā Puna Wai Sports Hub
Denmark	DoubleTree by Hilton Perth – Waterfront	Kingsway Reserve
England	Crowne Plaza Terrigal Pacific	Central Coast Stadium
France	Grand Mercure Hills Lodge	Valentine Sports Park 1
Germany	Mercure Kooindah Waters	Central Coast Regional Sporting & Recreation Complex
Haiti	Rendezvous Hotel Perth Scarborough	Percy Doyle Reserve
Italy	Grand Millennium Auckland	Shepherds Park
Jamaica	Novotel Melbourne – Preston	Victorian State Football Centre
Japan	Rydges Latimer Christchurch	Christchurch Stadium
Morocco	Lancemore Mansion Hotel Werribee Park	Galvin Park Reserve
Netherlands	Trinity Wharf – Tauranga	Bay Oval
New Zealand	Pullman Auckland Hotel & Apartments	Keith Hay Park
Nigeria	Sofitel Brisbane Central	Lions Stadium
Norway	M Social Auckland	Seddon Fields
Panama	The Playford Adelaide – MGallery	Adelaide United Training Centre
Philippines	Mövenpick Hotel	Olympic Park Auckland
Portugal	Waipuna Hotel and Conference Centre	Māngere Centre Park
Republic of Ireland	Emporium Hotel South Bank	Goodwin Park
South Africa	InterContinental Hotel Wellington	Porirua Park
South Korea	Rydges Campbelltown	Campbelltown Sports Stadium
Spain	Copthorne Palmerston North	Massey Sport Institute Palmerston North
Sweden	NZCIS Accommodation Wellington	NZ Campus of Innovation & Sport
Switzerland	Distinction Dunedin Hotel	Tahuna Park
United States	Sofitel Auckland Viaduct Harbour	Bay City Park
Vietnam	Rydges Auckland	Fred Taylor Park
Zambia	Novotel Hamilton – Tainui	Korikori Park

== Teams ==
=== Qualification ===
FIFA's confederations organised their qualifications through continental championships, with the exception of UEFA which organised its own qualifying competition. Australia and New Zealand, as co-hosts, qualified automatically for the tournament, leaving the remaining 207 FIFA member associations eligible to enter qualification if they chose to do so. Australia competed at the 2022 AFC Women's Asian Cup, whilst New Zealand did not enter the OFC Women's Nations Cup the same year. The reigning Women's World Cup champions United States competed in qualification through the CONCACAF W Championship.

The Chadian and Pakistani football associations were suspended by FIFA, thus excluding them from entering qualifications. Rwanda, Sudan, DR Congo and São Tomé and Príncipe entered qualification but withdrew later. Kenya withdrew before the second round of qualifiers. North Korea and Turkmenistan withdrew from the Women's Asian Cup qualifiers due to safety concerns and travel restrictions related to the COVID-19 pandemic. Iraq withdrew after the AFC draw. Due to the uncertainty of women's sport after the Taliban takeover of the country, Afghanistan withdrew from qualification. Due to COVID-19 pandemic outbreaks in their squads, Women's Asian Cup hosts India withdrew from qualification. American Samoa withdrew due to continuing difficulties related to the pandemic. Russia were disqualified from competing due to the Russian invasion of Ukraine.

The allocation of slots for each confederation was confirmed by the FIFA Council on 25 December 2020. The slots for the two host nations were taken directly from the quotas allocated to their confederations.

- AFC (Asia): 6 slots (including co-hosts Australia)
- CAF (Africa): 4 slots
- CONCACAF (North America, Central America and the Caribbean): 4 slots
- CONMEBOL (South America): 3 slots
- OFC (Oceania): 1 slot (including co-hosts New Zealand)
- UEFA (Europe): 11 slots
- Inter-confederation play-off tournament: 3 slots

A ten-team play-off tournament decided the final three spots at the Women's World Cup. The play-off slot allocation was as follows:

- AFC (Asia): 2 slots
- CAF (Africa): 2 slots
- CONCACAF (North America, Central America and the Caribbean): 2 slots
- CONMEBOL (South America): 2 slots
- OFC (Oceania): 1 slot
- UEFA (Europe): 1 slot

Of the 32 nations qualified for the 2023 FIFA Women's World Cup, 20 countries competed at the previous tournament in 2019. Haiti, Morocco, Panama, the Philippines, Portugal, the Republic of Ireland, Vietnam and Zambia made their debuts at the FIFA Women's World Cup. This World Cup was the first FIFA tournament the Philippines played in. This was Panama, Portugal and Vietnam's first FIFA women's competition, having only taken part in various FIFA men's tournaments. Zambia made history as the first landlocked country in Africa to qualify for a World Cup for either sex. Morocco became the first-ever Arab country to qualify for the Women's World Cup, while the Republic of Ireland marked their debut at any senior women's tournament. Denmark made their first appearance in 16 years after missing three consecutive tournaments, their last appearance being in 2007. Costa Rica, Colombia and Switzerland returned to the tournament after missing the previous one in 2019. Italy qualified for two consecutive women's World Cups for the first time in their history, after three sporadic appearances in 1991, 1999 and 2019. Africa had four representatives for the first time in the competition's history.

Thailand, Cameroon, Chile, and Scotland, all of whom qualified for the 2019 Women's World Cup, did not qualify for the 2023 tournament. Iceland was the highest ranked team in the FIFA Women's World Rankings that failed to qualify, ranked 16th at the time. (Note: North Korea, ranked 10th, withdrew from qualifications.) Zambia were the lowest ranked team to qualify, ranked 81st at the time.

The qualified teams, listed by region, with numbers in parentheses indicating final positions in the FIFA Women's World Ranking before the tournament were:

AFC (6)

- Australia (10) (co-hosts)
- China (14)
- Japan (11)
- Philippines (46) (debut)
- South Korea (17)
- Vietnam (32) (debut)

CAF (4)

- Morocco (72) (debut)
- Nigeria (40)
- South Africa (54)
- Zambia (77) (debut)

CONCACAF (6)

- Canada (7)
- Costa Rica (36)
- Haiti (53) (debut)
- Jamaica (43)
- Panama (52) (debut)
- United States (1)

CONMEBOL (3)

- Argentina (28)
- Brazil (8)
- Colombia (25)

OFC (1)

- New Zealand (26) (co-hosts)

UEFA (12)

- Denmark (13)
- England (4)
- France (5)
- Germany (2)
- Italy (16)
- Netherlands (9)
- Norway (12)
- Portugal (21) (debut)
- Republic of Ireland (22) (debut)
- Spain (6)
- Sweden (3)
- Switzerland (20)

Teams qualified Teams failed to qualify Teams withdrew or suspended Did not enter

=== Squads ===
Each team had to provide to FIFA a preliminary squad of between 35 and 55 players, which FIFA did not publish. From the preliminary squad, each team had to name a final squad of 23 players (three of whom must be goalkeepers) by 9 July 2023. Players in the final squad could be replaced by a player from the preliminary squad due to serious injury or illness up to 24 hours prior to kickoff of the team's first match.

=== Draw ===
The final draw took place at the Aotea Centre in Auckland, New Zealand, on 22 October 2022 at 19:30 NZDT (UTC+13), prior to the completion of qualification. The three winners of the inter-confederation play-off were not known at the time of the draw.

Retired American international and two-time Women's World Cup winner Carli Lloyd and CNN International sports presenter Amanda Davies conducted the draw. Each confederation had a retired international representing them as a draw assistant: Maia Jackman of New Zealand for the OFC and Julie Dolan of Australia for the AFC, alongside men's internationals Ian Wright of England for UEFA, Alexi Lalas of the United States for CONCACAF, Geremi of Cameroon for the CAF and 2002 World Cup winner Gilberto Silva of Brazil for CONMEBOL. Snowboarding Olympic gold medalist Zoi Sadowski-Synnott of New Zealand and four-time swimming Olympic gold medalist Cate Campbell of Australia also assisted the draw.

For the draw, the 32 teams were allocated into four pots based on the FIFA Women's World Rankings of 13 October 2022. Pot one contained both co-hosts New Zealand and Australia (both automatically placed in positions A1 and B1, respectively) along with the best six teams. Pot two contained the next best eight teams, with the next best eight teams being allocated into the following pot (pot three). Pot four contained the lowest ranked teams, along with the placeholders for the three inter-confederation play-off winners. With the exception of UEFA, teams from the same confederation could not be drawn in the same group. However, since each inter-confederation play-off group contained multiple confederations, the placeholders were identified by the seeded teams in their respective play-off pathways to avoid any draw constraints. The draw started with pot one and ended with pot four, with the team selected being allocated to the first available group alphabetically. Pot 1 teams were automatically drawn to position 1 of each group, with the following positions drawn for the remaining pots. The pots for the draws are shown below.

Pot 1	Pot 2	Pot 3	Pot 4
New Zealand (22) (co-hosts); Australia (13) (co-hosts); United States (1) (title holders); Sweden (2); Germany (3); England (4); France (5); Spain (6)	Canada (7); Netherlands (8); Brazil (9); Japan (11); Norway (12); Italy (14); China (15); South Korea (17)	Denmark (18); Switzerland (21); Republic of Ireland (24); Colombia (27); Argentina (29); Vietnam (34); Costa Rica (37); Jamaica (43)	Nigeria (45); Philippines (53); South Africa (54); Morocco (76); Zambia (81); Winner of Play-off Group A (Note: The placeholder for the play-off Group A winners adhered to the geographical constraints of a European team in the draw (based on the seeded team in the group, Portugal). The Group A winner that eventually qualified was Portugal.); Winner of Play-off Group B (Note: The placeholder for the play-off Group B winners adhered to the geographical constraints of a South American team in the draw (based on the seeded team in the group, Chile). The Group B winner that eventually qualified was Haiti.); Winner of Play-off Group C (Note: The placeholder for the play-off Group C winners adhered to the geographical constraints of an Asian and Oceanian team in the draw (based on the seeded teams in the group, Chinese Taipei and Papua New Guinea, respectively). The Group C winner that eventually qualified was Panama.)

==== Draw result ====
Group A
Pos	Team
A1	New Zealand (H)
A2	Norway
A3	Philippines
A4	Switzerland

Group E
Pos	Team
E1	United States
E2	Vietnam
E3	Netherlands
E4	Portugal

Group B
Pos	Team
B1	Australia (H)
B2	Republic of Ireland
B3	Nigeria
B4	Canada

Group F
Pos	Team
F1	France
F2	Jamaica
F3	Brazil
F4	Panama

Group C
Pos	Team
C1	Spain
C2	Costa Rica
C3	Zambia
C4	Japan

Group G
Pos	Team
G1	Sweden
G2	South Africa
G3	Italy
G4	Argentina

Group D
Pos	Team
D1	England
D2	Haiti
D3	Denmark
D4	China

Group H
Pos	Team
H1	Germany
H2	Morocco
H3	Colombia
H4	South Korea

Notes

(H): Hosts

== Officiating ==
In January 2023, the FIFA Referees Committee announced the list of 33 referees, 55 assistant referees, and 19 video assistant referees (VAR) for the tournament. Of the 33 referees, FIFA included 2 each from Australia, Canada, South Korea, and the United States.

France's Stéphanie Frappart, Salima Mukansanga from Rwanda, and Yoshimi Yamashita from Japan, who became the first female referees to officiate the men's World Cup in 2022, were among those selected for the Women's World Cup. They were also joined by female assistant referees Neuza Back, Kathryn Nesbitt, and Karen Díaz Medina, who also participated at the men's tournament.

Heba Saadieh became the first Palestinian and Arab female referee to officiate at a World Cup of either gender. Firas Abu Hilal, secretary general of the Palestinian Football Association labelled Saadia as "a role model for Palestinian women who aspire to achieve success and greatness" and that she "has proven the ability of Palestinian women to excel in any field".

The VAR at the tournament had the spoken explanations broadcast in the stadium and on television as part of a year-long trial of the technique intended to give more transparency to often-controversial decisions. Other sports with video referees already used the measure, with FIFA also having implemented it at the 2022 FIFA Club World Cup and 2023 FIFA U-20 World Cup.

On 18 August 2023, FIFA announced that American referee Tori Penso would adjudicate the final at Stadium Australia.

== Ceremonies ==
=== Opening ceremonies ===
There were two opening ceremonies, one before each kick-off game in the two host nations on 20 July 2023. The first took place at Eden Park, Auckland, ahead of the opening game of the competition between New Zealand and Norway. The ceremonies both featured indigenous welcomes, fireworks, dancing and live music, before a moment of silence. A few hours before the opening ceremony, a shooting occurred in downtown Auckland during which three people, including the assailant, were killed. A moment of silence was held for the attack victims.

The Eden Park ceremony was noted to be very brief. It began with Māori and indigenous Australian artists; colour and culture representing the indigenous people featured in the ceremony, with a haka being performed as well. There was a dance with groups of dancers representing each nation competing at the tournament, and a montage of star players from all the participants. To close the ceremony, New Zealand singer Benee and Australian singer Mallrat performed the tournament's official song, "Do It Again".

At Stadium Australia, Sydney, Indigenous Australian artists performed.

=== Closing ceremonies ===
The tournament's closing ceremony took place at Stadium Australia, Sydney, on 20 August 2023, ahead of the Final. The ceremony featured a Welcome to Country, and a performance from Australian singer Tones and I.

There was also an extended pre-game ceremony featuring a Māori poi performance prior to the first semi-final at Eden Park, Auckland as it was the final match to be held in New Zealand.

== Impact ==
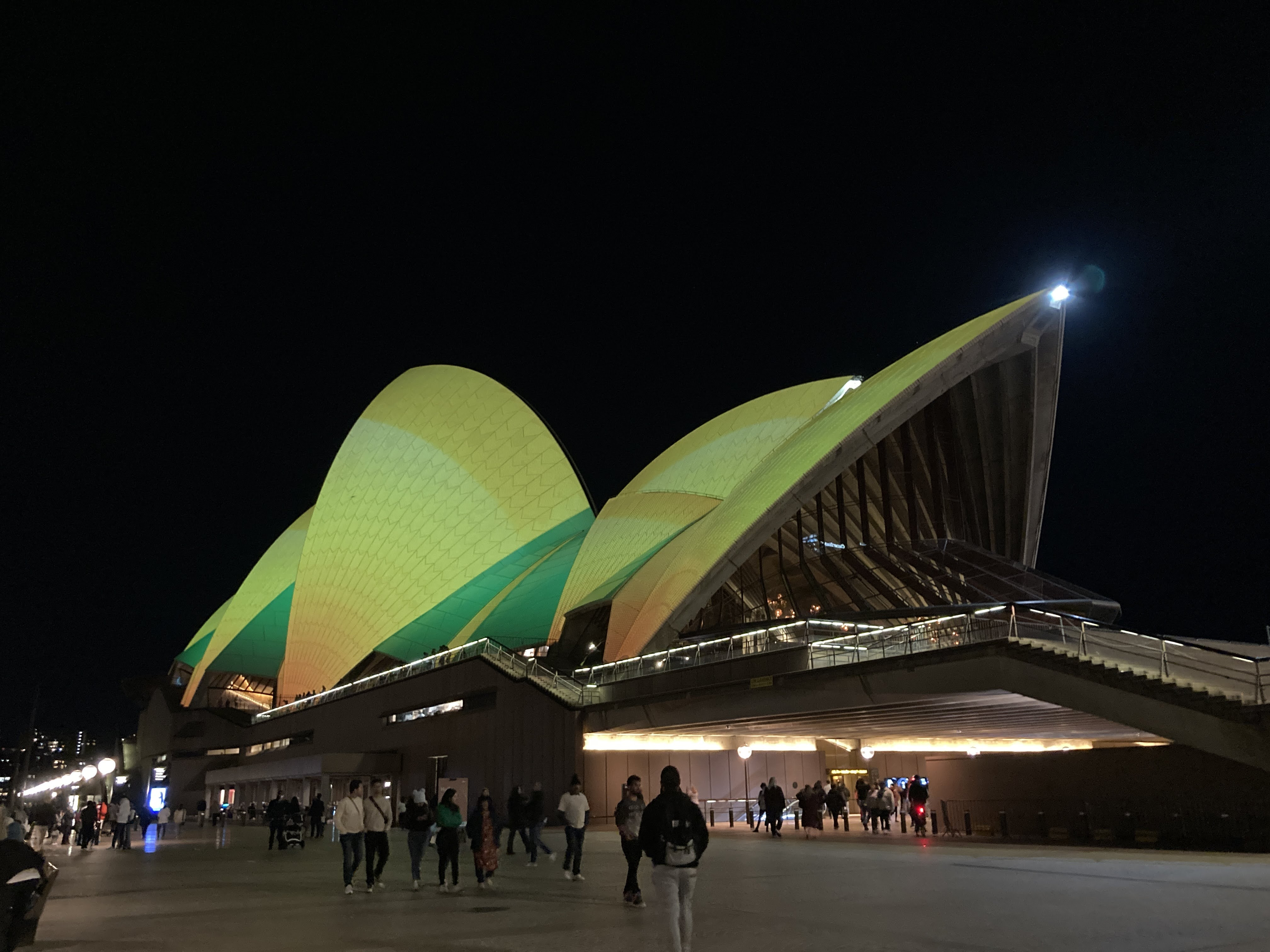
The Sydney Opera House lit up in support of the Matildas during the third-place match

The performance of the Australian national women's team (nicknamed "the Matildas") greatly increased public interest in the sport. Amidst the tournament, FIFA said "football is the only subject on everyone's lips" in the nation, having an "enormous impact" on the Australian public. The outpouring of support for the team was dubbed "Matildas fever" by the media. Writing for The Guardian, former professional soccer player Craig Foster said: "We are not so much watching a national team compete, as a changing nation at play," citing the Matildas' performance for "overturn[ing] misconceptions of women's sport" and inspiring young women.

Australian TV broadcast viewership records were broken multiple times, with 11.15 million watching the Matildas' match against England on the Seven Network. Live viewing sites were set up in cities around the country, with major stadiums being used to show the match in Sydney to cope with massive crowds. The Australian government pledged $200 million to improve women's sporting facilities as a direct result of the team's success.

The success of the tournament and the high viewership increased support for Australia and New Zealand to host the 2034 FIFA World Cup. The tournament netted NZ$109.5 million to New Zealand's economy, which was more than double the projected $46.3 million.

New Zealand Football have already stated a 25% increase in girls and women playing football occurred in New Zealand as of 2023, with more expected to play in 2024, the first full season after the conclusion of the tournament. The tournament has also left its effect on the New Zealand community, with 30 sports venues receiving upgrades for the tournament.

Following the tournament, Football Australia CEO James Johnson stated that the successful delivery of the 2023 FIFA Women's World Cup demonstrated Australia's ability to host major international sporting competitions. On 15 May 2024, the Asian Football Confederation confirmed that Australia would host the 2026 AFC Women's Asian Cup.

== Group stage ==
The group stage was played from 20 July to 3 August. Competing countries were divided into eight groups of four teams (groups A to H). Teams in each group played one another in a round-robin, with the top two teams advancing to the knockout stage.

Tie-breaking criteria for group play
The ranking of teams in the group stage was determined as follows:
1. Points obtained in all group matches (three points for a win, one for a draw, none for a defeat);
2. Goal difference in all group matches;
3. Number of goals scored in all group matches;
4. Points obtained in the matches played between the teams in question;
5. Goal difference in the matches played between the teams in question;
6. Number of goals scored in the matches played between the teams in question;
7. Fair play points in all group matches (only one deduction could be applied to a player in a single match):
  - Yellow card: −1 point;
  - Indirect red card (second yellow card): −3 points;
  - Direct red card: −4 points;
  - Yellow card and direct red card: −5 points;
8. Drawing of lots.

Result of countries participating in the 2023 FIFA Women's World Cup

=== Group A ===
Pos	Team	Pld	W	D	L	GF	GA	GD	Pts	Qualification
1	Switzerland	3	1	2	0	2	0	+2	5	Advance to knockout stage
2	Norway	3	1	1	1	6	1	+5	4	Advance to knockout stage
3	New Zealand (H)	3	1	1	1	1	1	0	4	
4	Philippines	3	1	0	2	1	8	−7	3	

Source: FIFA
(H) Hosts
20 July 2023
19:00 UTC+12

New Zealand	1–0	Norway
Wilkinson 48'	Report

Eden Park, Auckland
Attendance: 42,137
Referee: Yoshimi Yamashita (Japan)
21 July 2023
17:00 UTC+12

Philippines	0–2	Switzerland
	Report	Bachmann 45' (pen.); Piubel 64'

Forsyth Barr Stadium, Dunedin
Attendance: 13,711
Referee: Vincentia Amedome (Togo)

25 July 2023
17:30 UTC+12

New Zealand	0–1	Philippines
	Report	Bolden 24'

Wellington Regional Stadium, Wellington
Attendance: 32,357
Referee: Katia García (Mexico)
25 July 2023
20:00 UTC+12

Switzerland	0–0	Norway
	Report

Waikato Stadium, Hamilton
Attendance: 10,769
Referee: Stéphanie Frappart (France)

30 July 2023
19:00 UTC+12

Switzerland	0–0	New Zealand
	Report

Forsyth Barr Stadium, Dunedin
Attendance: 25,947
Referee: Tori Penso (United States)
30 July 2023
19:00 UTC+12

Norway	6–0	Philippines
Román Haug 6', 17', 90+5'; Graham Hansen 31'; Barker 48' (o.g.); Reiten 53' (pen.)	Report

Eden Park, Auckland
Attendance: 34,697
Referee: Marie-Soleil Beaudoin (Canada)

=== Group B ===
Pos	Team	Pld	W	D	L	GF	GA	GD	Pts	Qualification
1	Australia (H)	3	2	0	1	7	3	+4	6	Advance to knockout stage
2	Nigeria	3	1	2	0	3	2	+1	5	Advance to knockout stage
3	Canada	3	1	1	1	2	5	−3	4	
4	Republic of Ireland	3	0	1	2	1	3	−2	1	

Source: FIFA
(H) Hosts
20 July 2023
20:00 UTC+10

Australia	1–0	Republic of Ireland
Catley 52' (pen.)	Report

Stadium Australia, Sydney
Attendance: 75,784
Referee: Edina Alves Batista (Brazil)
21 July 2023
12:30 UTC+10

Nigeria	0–0	Canada
	Report

Melbourne Rectangular Stadium, Melbourne
Attendance: 21,410
Referee: Lina Lehtovaara (Finland)

26 July 2023
20:00 UTC+8

Canada	2–1	Republic of Ireland
Connolly 45+5' (o.g.); Leon 53'	Report	McCabe 4'

Perth Rectangular Stadium, Perth
Attendance: 17,065
Referee: Laura Fortunato (Argentina)
27 July 2023
20:00 UTC+10

Australia	2–3	Nigeria
Van Egmond 45+1'; Kennedy 90+10'	Report	Kanu 45+6'; Ohale 65'; Oshoala 72'

Lang Park, Brisbane
Attendance: 49,156
Referee: Esther Staubli (Switzerland)

31 July 2023
20:00 UTC+10

Canada	0–4	Australia
	Report	Raso 9', 39'; Fowler 58'; Catley 90+4' (pen.)

Melbourne Rectangular Stadium, Melbourne
Attendance: 27,706
Referee: Stéphanie Frappart (France)
31 July 2023
20:00 UTC+10

Republic of Ireland	0–0	Nigeria
	Report

Lang Park, Brisbane
Attendance: 24,884
Referee: Katia García (Mexico)

=== Group C ===
Pos	Team	Pld	W	D	L	GF	GA	GD	Pts	Qualification
1	Japan	3	3	0	0	11	0	+11	9	Advance to knockout stage
2	Spain	3	2	0	1	8	4	+4	6	Advance to knockout stage
3	Zambia	3	1	0	2	3	11	−8	3	
4	Costa Rica	3	0	0	3	1	8	−7	0	

Source: FIFA
21 July 2023
19:30 UTC+12

Spain	3–0	Costa Rica
Del Campo 21' (o.g.); Bonmatí 23'; González 27'	Report

Wellington Regional Stadium, Wellington
Attendance: 22,966
Referee: Casey Reibelt (Australia)
22 July 2023
19:00 UTC+12

Zambia	0–5	Japan
	Report	Miyazawa 43', 62'; Mi. Tanaka 55'; Endō 71'; Ueki 90+11' (pen.)

Waikato Stadium, Hamilton
Attendance: 16,111
Referee: Tess Olofsson (Sweden)

26 July 2023
17:00 UTC+12

Japan	2–0	Costa Rica
Naomoto 25'; Fujino 27'	Report

Forsyth Barr Stadium, Dunedin
Attendance: 6,992
Referee: Maria Sole Ferrieri Caputi (Italy)
26 July 2023
19:30 UTC+12

Spain	5–0	Zambia
Abelleira 9'; Hermoso 13', 70'; Redondo 69', 85'	Report

Eden Park, Auckland
Attendance: 20,983
Referee: Oh Hyeon-jeong (South Korea)

31 July 2023
19:00 UTC+12

Japan	4–0	Spain
Miyazawa 12', 40'; Ueki 29'; Mi. Tanaka 82'	Report

Wellington Regional Stadium, Wellington
Attendance: 20,957
Referee: Ekaterina Koroleva (United States)
31 July 2023
19:00 UTC+12

Costa Rica	1–3	Zambia
Herrera 47'	Report	Mweemba 3'; B. Banda 31' (pen.); Kundananji 90+3'

Waikato Stadium, Hamilton
Attendance: 8,117
Referee: Bouchra Karboubi (Morocco)

=== Group D ===
Pos	Team	Pld	W	D	L	GF	GA	GD	Pts	Qualification
1	England	3	3	0	0	8	1	+7	9	Advance to knockout stage
2	Denmark	3	2	0	1	3	1	+2	6	Advance to knockout stage
3	China	3	1	0	2	2	7	−5	3	
4	Haiti	3	0	0	3	0	4	−4	0	

Source: FIFA
22 July 2023
19:30 UTC+10

England	1–0	Haiti
Stanway 29' (pen.)	Report

Lang Park, Brisbane
Attendance: 44,369
Referee: Emikar Calderas (Venezuela)
22 July 2023
20:00 UTC+8

Denmark	1–0	China
Vangsgaard 90'	Report

Perth Rectangular Stadium, Perth
Attendance: 16,989
Referee: Marie-Soleil Beaudoin (Canada)

28 July 2023
18:30 UTC+10

England	1–0	Denmark
James 6'	Report

Sydney Football Stadium, Sydney
Attendance: 40,439
Referee: Tess Olofsson (Sweden)
28 July 2023
20:30 UTC+9:30

China	1–0	Haiti
Wang Shuang 74' (pen.)	Report

Hindmarsh Stadium, Adelaide
Attendance: 12,675
Referee: Marta Huerta de Aza (Spain)

1 August 2023
20:30 UTC+9:30

China	1–6	England
Wang Shuang 57' (pen.)	Report	Russo 4'; Hemp 26'; James 41', 65'; Kelly 77'; Daly 84'

Hindmarsh Stadium, Adelaide
Attendance: 13,497
Referee: Casey Reibelt (Australia)
1 August 2023
19:00 UTC+8

Haiti	0–2	Denmark
	Report	Harder 21' (pen.); Troelsgaard 90+10'

Perth Rectangular Stadium, Perth
Attendance: 17,897
Referee: Oh Hyeon-jeong (South Korea)

=== Group E ===
Pos	Team	Pld	W	D	L	GF	GA	GD	Pts	Qualification
1	Netherlands	3	2	1	0	9	1	+8	7	Advance to knockout stage
2	United States	3	1	2	0	4	1	+3	5	Advance to knockout stage
3	Portugal	3	1	1	1	2	1	+1	4	
4	Vietnam	3	0	0	3	0	12	−12	0	

Source: FIFA
22 July 2023
13:00 UTC+12

United States	3–0	Vietnam
Smith 14', 45+7'; Horan 77'	Report

Eden Park, Auckland
Attendance: 41,107
Referee: Bouchra Karboubi (Morocco)
23 July 2023
19:30 UTC+12

Netherlands	1–0	Portugal
Van der Gragt 13'	Report

Forsyth Barr Stadium, Dunedin
Attendance: 11,991
Referee: Kateryna Monzul (Ukraine)

27 July 2023
13:00 UTC+12

United States	1–1	Netherlands
Horan 62'	Report	Roord 17'

Wellington Regional Stadium, Wellington
Attendance: 27,312
Referee: Yoshimi Yamashita (Japan)
27 July 2023
19:30 UTC+12

Portugal	2–0	Vietnam
Encarnação 7'; Nazareth 21'	Report

Waikato Stadium, Hamilton
Attendance: 6,645
Referee: Salima Mukansanga (Rwanda)

1 August 2023
19:00 UTC+12

Portugal	0–0	United States
	Report

Eden Park, Auckland
Attendance: 42,958
Referee: Rebecca Welch (England)
1 August 2023
19:00 UTC+12

Vietnam	0–7	Netherlands
	Report	Martens 8'; Snoeijs 11'; Brugts 18', 57'; Roord 23', 83'; Van de Donk 45'

Forsyth Barr Stadium, Dunedin
Attendance: 8,215
Referee: Ivana Martinčić (Croatia)

=== Group F ===
Pos	Team	Pld	W	D	L	GF	GA	GD	Pts	Qualification
1	France	3	2	1	0	8	4	+4	7	Advance to knockout stage
2	Jamaica	3	1	2	0	1	0	+1	5	Advance to knockout stage
3	Brazil	3	1	1	1	5	2	+3	4	
4	Panama	3	0	0	3	3	11	−8	0	

Source: FIFA
23 July 2023
20:00 UTC+10

France	0–0	Jamaica
	Report

Sydney Football Stadium, Sydney
Attendance: 39,045
Referee: María Carvajal (Chile)
24 July 2023
20:30 UTC+9:30

Brazil	4–0	Panama
Ary Borges 19', 39', 70'; Bia Zaneratto 48'	Report

Hindmarsh Stadium, Adelaide
Attendance: 13,142
Referee: Cheryl Foster (Wales)

29 July 2023
20:00 UTC+10

France	2–1	Brazil
Le Sommer 17'; Renard 83'	Report	Debinha 58'

Lang Park, Brisbane
Attendance: 49,378
Referee: Kate Jacewicz (Australia)
29 July 2023
20:30 UTC+8

Panama	0–1	Jamaica
	Report	A. Swaby 56'

Perth Rectangular Stadium, Perth
Attendance: 15,987
Referee: Kateryna Monzul (Ukraine)

2 August 2023
20:00 UTC+10

Panama	3–6	France
Cox 2'; Pinzón 64' (pen.); L. Cedeño 87'	Report	Lakrar 21'; Diani 28', 37' (pen.), 52' (pen.); Le Garrec 45+5'; Bècho 90+10'

Sydney Football Stadium, Sydney
Attendance: 40,498
Referee: Laura Fortunato (Argentina)
2 August 2023
20:00 UTC+10

Jamaica	0–0	Brazil
	Report

Melbourne Rectangular Stadium, Melbourne
Attendance: 27,638
Referee: Esther Staubli (Switzerland)

=== Group G ===
Pos	Team	Pld	W	D	L	GF	GA	GD	Pts	Qualification
1	Sweden	3	3	0	0	9	1	+8	9	Advance to knockout stage
2	South Africa	3	1	1	1	6	6	0	4	Advance to knockout stage
3	Italy	3	1	0	2	3	8	−5	3	
4	Argentina	3	0	1	2	2	5	−3	1	

Source: FIFA
23 July 2023
17:00 UTC+12

Sweden	2–1	South Africa
Rolfö 65'; Ilestedt 90'	Report	Magaia 48'

Wellington Regional Stadium, Wellington
Attendance: 18,317
Referee: Ekaterina Koroleva (United States)
24 July 2023
18:00 UTC+12

Italy	1–0	Argentina
Girelli 87'	Report

Eden Park, Auckland
Attendance: 30,889
Referee: Melissa Borjas (Honduras)

28 July 2023
12:00 UTC+12

Argentina	2–2	South Africa
Braun 74'; Núñez 79'	Report	Motlhalo 30'; Kgatlana 66'

Forsyth Barr Stadium, Dunedin
Attendance: 8,834
Referee: Anna-Marie Keighley (New Zealand)
29 July 2023
19:30 UTC+12

Sweden	5–0	Italy
Ilestedt 39', 50'; Rolfö 44'; Blackstenius 45+1'; Blomqvist 90+5'	Report

Wellington Regional Stadium, Wellington
Attendance: 29,143
Referee: Cheryl Foster (Wales)

2 August 2023
19:00 UTC+12

Argentina	0–2	Sweden
	Report	Blomqvist 66'; Rubensson 90' (pen.)

Waikato Stadium, Hamilton
Attendance: 17,907
Referee: Salima Mukansanga (Rwanda)
2 August 2023
19:00 UTC+12

South Africa	3–2	Italy
Orsi 32' (o.g.); Magaia 67'; Kgatlana 90+2'	Report	Caruso 11' (pen.), 74'

Wellington Regional Stadium, Wellington
Attendance: 14,967
Referee: María Carvajal (Chile)

=== Group H ===
Pos	Team	Pld	W	D	L	GF	GA	GD	Pts	Qualification
1	Colombia	3	2	0	1	4	2	+2	6	Advance to knockout stage
2	Morocco	3	2	0	1	2	6	−4	6	Advance to knockout stage
3	Germany	3	1	1	1	8	3	+5	4	
4	South Korea	3	0	1	2	1	4	−3	1	

Source: FIFA
24 July 2023
18:30 UTC+10

Germany	6–0	Morocco
Popp 11', 39'; Bühl 46'; Aït El Haj 54' (o.g.); Redouani 79' (o.g.); Schüller 90'	Report

Melbourne Rectangular Stadium, Melbourne
Attendance: 27,256
Referee: Tori Penso (United States)
25 July 2023
12:00 UTC+10

Colombia	2–0	South Korea
Usme 30' (pen.); Caicedo 39'	Report

Sydney Football Stadium, Sydney
Attendance: 24,323
Referee: Rebecca Welch (England)

30 July 2023
14:00 UTC+9:30

South Korea	0–1	Morocco
	Report	Jraïdi 6'

Hindmarsh Stadium, Adelaide
Attendance: 12,886
Referee: Edina Alves Batista (Brazil)
30 July 2023
19:30 UTC+10

Germany	1–2	Colombia
Popp 89' (pen.)	Report	Caicedo 52'; Vanegas 90+7'

Sydney Football Stadium, Sydney
Attendance: 40,499
Referee: Melissa Borjas (Honduras)

3 August 2023
20:00 UTC+10

South Korea	1–1	Germany
Cho So-hyun 6'	Report	Popp 42'

Lang Park, Brisbane
Attendance: 38,945
Referee: Anna-Marie Keighley (New Zealand)
3 August 2023
18:00 UTC+8

Morocco	1–0	Colombia
Lahmari 45+4'	Report

Perth Rectangular Stadium, Perth
Attendance: 17,342
Referee: Maria Sole Ferrieri Caputi (Italy)

== Knockout stage ==
In the knockout stage, if a match was level at the end of 90 minutes of normal playing time, extra time was played (two periods of 15 minutes each). If the score was still level after extra time, the winners were determined by a penalty shoot-out.

=== Bracket ===
Round of 16
5 August – Auckland
Switzerland	1
Spain	5
6 August – Sydney (SFS)
Netherlands	2
South Africa	0
5 August – Wellington
Japan	3
Norway	1
6 August – Melbourne
Sweden (p)	0 (5)
United States	0 (4)
7 August – Sydney (SA)
Australia	2
Denmark	0
8 August – Adelaide
France	4
Morocco	0
7 August – Brisbane
England (p)	0 (4)
Nigeria	0 (2)
8 August – Melbourne
Colombia	1
Jamaica	0

Quarter-finals
11 August – Wellington
Spain (a.e.t.)	2
Netherlands	1
11 August – Auckland
Japan	1
Sweden	2
12 August – Brisbane
Australia (p)	0 (7)
France	0 (6)
12 August – Sydney (SA)
England	2
Colombia	1

Semi-finals
15 August – Auckland
Spain	2
Sweden	1
16 August – Sydney (SA)
Australia	1
England	3

Final
20 August – Sydney (SA)
Spain	1
England	0
Third place play-off
19 August – Brisbane
Sweden	2
Australia	0

=== Round of 16 ===
5 August 2023
17:00 UTC+12

Switzerland	1–5	Spain
Codina 11' (o.g.)	Report	Bonmatí 5', 36'; Redondo 17'; Codina 45'; Hermoso 70'

Eden Park, Auckland
Attendance: 43,217
Referee: Cheryl Foster (Wales)

5 August 2023
20:00 UTC+12

Japan	3–1	Norway
Syrstad Engen 15' (o.g.); Shimizu 50'; Miyazawa 81'	Report	Reiten 20'

Wellington Regional Stadium, Wellington
Attendance: 33,042
Referee: Edina Alves Batista (Brazil)

6 August 2023
12:00 UTC+10

Netherlands	2–0	South Africa
Roord 9'; Beerensteyn 68'	Report

Sydney Football Stadium, Sydney
Attendance: 40,233
Referee: Yoshimi Yamashita (Japan)

6 August 2023
19:00 UTC+10

Sweden	0–0 (a.e.t.)	United States
	Report
Penalties
Rolfö (penalty scored); Rubensson (penalty scored); Björn (penalty missed); Blomqvist (penalty missed); Bennison (penalty scored); Eriksson (penalty scored); Hurtig (penalty scored)	5–4	(penalty scored) Sullivan; (penalty scored) Horan; (penalty scored) Mewis; (penalty missed) Rapinoe; (penalty missed) Smith; (penalty scored) Naeher; (penalty missed) O'Hara

Melbourne Rectangular Stadium, Melbourne
Attendance: 27,706
Referee: Stéphanie Frappart (France)

7 August 2023
17:30 UTC+10

England	0–0 (a.e.t.)	Nigeria
	Report
Penalties
Stanway (penalty missed); England (penalty scored); Daly (penalty scored); Greenwood (penalty scored); Kelly (penalty scored)	4–2	(penalty missed) Oparanozie; (penalty missed) Alozie; (penalty scored) Ajibade; (penalty scored) Ucheibe

Lang Park, Brisbane
Attendance: 49,461
Referee: Melissa Borjas (Honduras)

7 August 2023
20:30 UTC+10

Australia	2–0	Denmark
Foord 29'; Raso 70'	Report

Stadium Australia, Sydney
Attendance: 75,784
Referee: Rebecca Welch (England)

8 August 2023
18:00 UTC+10

Colombia	1–0	Jamaica
Usme 51'	Report

Melbourne Rectangular Stadium, Melbourne
Attendance: 27,706
Referee: Kate Jacewicz (Australia)

8 August 2023
20:30 UTC+9:30

France	4–0	Morocco
Diani 15'; Dali 20'; Le Sommer 23', 70'	Report

Hindmarsh Stadium, Adelaide
Attendance: 13,557
Referee: Tori Penso (United States)

=== Quarter-finals ===
11 August 2023
13:00 UTC+12

Spain	2–1 (a.e.t.)	Netherlands
Caldentey 81' (pen.); Paralluelo 111'	Report	Van der Gragt 90+1'

Wellington Regional Stadium, Wellington
Attendance: 32,021
Referee: Stéphanie Frappart (France)

11 August 2023
19:30 UTC+12

Japan	1–2	Sweden
Hayashi 87'	Report	Ilestedt 32'; Angeldahl 51' (pen.)

Eden Park, Auckland
Attendance: 43,217
Referee: Esther Staubli (Switzerland)

12 August 2023
17:00 UTC+10

Australia	0–0 (a.e.t.)	France
	Report
Penalties
Foord (penalty scored); Catley (penalty missed); Kerr (penalty scored); Fowler (penalty scored); Arnold (penalty missed); Gorry (penalty scored); Yallop (penalty scored); Carpenter (penalty scored); Hunt (penalty missed); Vine (penalty scored)	7–6	(penalty missed) Bacha; (penalty scored) Diani; (penalty scored) Renard; (penalty scored) Le Sommer; (penalty missed) Périsset; (penalty scored) Geyoro; (penalty scored) Karchaoui; (penalty scored) Lakrar; (penalty missed) Dali; (penalty missed) Bècho

Lang Park, Brisbane
Attendance: 49,461
Referee: María Carvajal (Chile)

12 August 2023
20:30 UTC+10

England	2–1	Colombia
Hemp 45+7'; Russo 63'	Report	Santos 44'

Stadium Australia, Sydney
Attendance: 75,784
Referee: Ekaterina Koroleva (United States)

=== Semi-finals ===
15 August 2023
20:00 UTC+12

Spain	2–1	Sweden
Paralluelo 81'; Carmona 89'	Report	Blomqvist 88'

Eden Park, Auckland
Attendance: 43,217
Referee: Edina Alves Batista (Brazil)

16 August 2023
20:00 UTC+10

Australia	1–3	England
Kerr 63'	Report	Toone 36'; Hemp 71'; Russo 86'

Stadium Australia, Sydney
Attendance: 75,784
Referee: Tori Penso (United States)

=== Third-place match ===
19 August 2023
18:00 UTC+10

Sweden	2–0	Australia
Rolfö 30' (pen.); Asllani 62'	Report

Lang Park, Brisbane
Attendance: 49,461
Referee: Cheryl Foster (Wales)

=== Final ===
20 August 2023
20:00 UTC+10

Spain	1–0	England
Carmona 29'	Report

Stadium Australia, Sydney
Attendance: 75,784
Referee: Tori Penso (United States)

== Awards ==
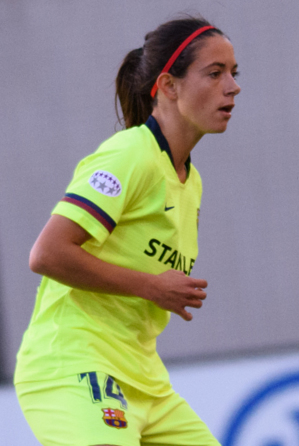
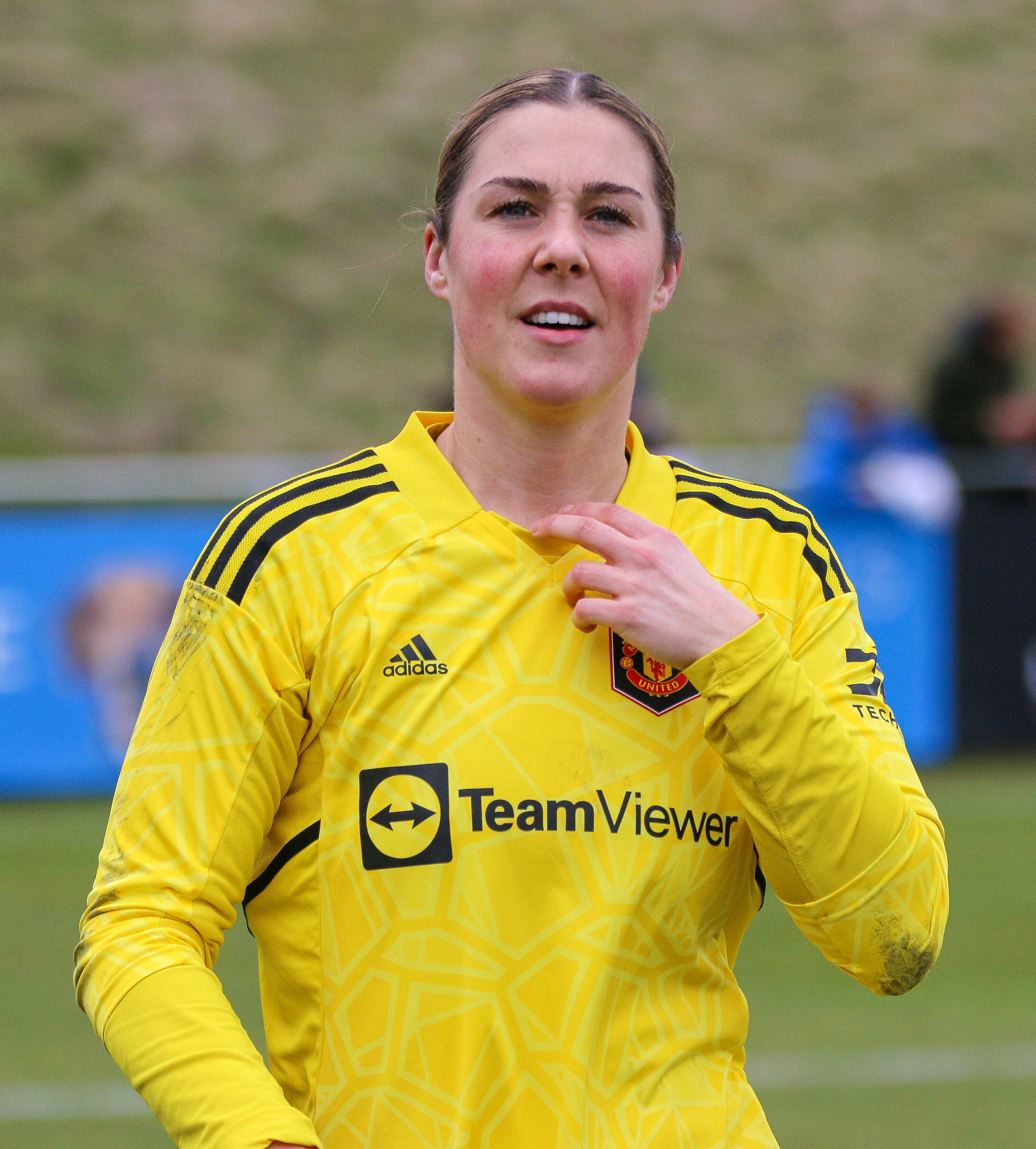
Spanish midfielder Aitana Bonmatí (left) won the Golden Ball award. England's Mary Earps (right) won the Golden Glove award.

The following World Cup awards were given at the conclusion of the tournament: the Golden Boot (top scorer), Golden Ball (best overall player) and Golden Glove (best goalkeeper)

Golden Ball	Silver Ball	Bronze Ball
(Spain) Aitana Bonmatí	(Spain) Jennifer Hermoso	(Sweden) Amanda Ilestedt
Golden Boot	Silver Boot	Bronze Boot
(Japan) Hinata Miyazawa	(France) Kadidiatou Diani	(Germany) Alexandra Popp
5 goals, 1 assist	4 goals, 3 assists	4 goals, 0 assists
Golden Glove
(England) Mary Earps
FIFA Young Player Award
(Spain) Salma Paralluelo
FIFA Fair Play Trophy
Japan

Additionally, FIFA.com shortlisted 10 goals for users to vote on as the tournament's best. The award was won by Colombia's Linda Caicedo for her goal in the group stage match against Germany.

== Statistics ==
=== Goalscorers ===
There were 164 goals scored in 64 matches, for an average of 2.56 goals per match.

5 goals

- (Japan) Hinata Miyazawa

4 goals

- (France) Kadidiatou Diani
- (Germany) Alexandra Popp
- (Netherlands) Jill Roord
- (Sweden) Amanda Ilestedt

3 goals

- (Australia) Hayley Raso
- (Brazil) Ary Borges
- (England) Lauren Hemp
- (England) Lauren James
- (England) Alessia Russo
- (France) Eugénie Le Sommer
- (Norway) Sophie Román Haug
- (Spain) Aitana Bonmatí
- (Spain) Jennifer Hermoso
- (Spain) Alba Redondo
- (Sweden) Rebecka Blomqvist
- (Sweden) Fridolina Rolfö

2 goals

- (Australia) Steph Catley
- (China) Wang Shuang
- (Colombia) Linda Caicedo
- (Colombia) Catalina Usme
- (Italy) Arianna Caruso
- (Japan) Mina Tanaka
- (Japan) Riko Ueki
- (Netherlands) Esmee Brugts
- (Netherlands) Stefanie van der Gragt
- (Norway) Guro Reiten
- (South Africa) Thembi Kgatlana
- (South Africa) Hildah Magaia
- (Spain) Olga Carmona
- (Spain) Salma Paralluelo
- (United States) Lindsey Horan
- (United States) Sophia Smith

1 goal

- (Argentina) Sophia Braun
- (Argentina) Romina Núñez
- (Australia) Emily van Egmond
- (Australia) Caitlin Foord
- (Australia) Mary Fowler
- (Australia) Alanna Kennedy
- (Australia) Sam Kerr
- (Brazil) Bia Zaneratto
- (Brazil) Debinha
- (Canada) Adriana Leon
- (Colombia) Leicy Santos
- (Colombia) Manuela Vanegas
- (Costa Rica) Melissa Herrera
- (Denmark) Pernille Harder
- (Denmark) Sanne Troelsgaard Nielsen
- (Denmark) Amalie Vangsgaard
- (England) Rachel Daly
- (England) Chloe Kelly
- (England) Georgia Stanway
- (England) Ella Toone
- (France) Vicki Bècho
- (France) Kenza Dali
- (France) Maëlle Lakrar
- (France) Léa Le Garrec
- (France) Wendie Renard
- (Germany) Klara Bühl
- (Germany) Lea Schüller
- (Italy) Cristiana Girelli
- (Jamaica) Allyson Swaby
- (Japan) Jun Endō
- (Japan) Aoba Fujino
- (Japan) Honoka Hayashi
- (Japan) Hikaru Naomoto
- (Japan) Risa Shimizu
- (Morocco) Ibtissam Jraïdi
- (Morocco) Anissa Lahmari
- (Netherlands) Lineth Beerensteyn
- (Netherlands) Daniëlle van de Donk
- (Netherlands) Lieke Martens
- (Netherlands) Katja Snoeijs
- (New Zealand) Hannah Wilkinson
- (Nigeria) Uchenna Kanu
- (Nigeria) Osinachi Ohale
- (Nigeria) Asisat Oshoala
- (Norway) Caroline Graham Hansen
- (Panama) Lineth Cedeño
- (Panama) Marta Cox
- (Panama) Yomira Pinzón
- (Philippines) Sarina Bolden
- (Portugal) Telma Encarnação
- (Portugal) Kika Nazareth
- (Republic of Ireland) Katie McCabe
- (South Africa) Linda Motlhalo
- (South Korea) Cho So-hyun
- (Spain) Teresa Abelleira
- (Spain) Mariona Caldentey
- (Spain) Laia Codina
- (Spain) Esther González
- (Sweden) Filippa Angeldahl
- (Sweden) Kosovare Asllani
- (Sweden) Stina Blackstenius
- (Sweden) Elin Rubensson
- (Switzerland) Ramona Bachmann
- (Switzerland) Seraina Piubel
- (Zambia) Barbra Banda
- (Zambia) Racheal Kundananji
- (Zambia) Lushomo Mweemba

1 own goal

- (Costa Rica) Valeria del Campo (against Spain)
- (Italy) Benedetta Orsi (against South Africa)
- (Morocco) Hanane Aït El Haj (against Germany)
- (Morocco) Zineb Redouani (against Germany)
- (Norway) Ingrid Syrstad Engen (against Japan)
- (Philippines) Alicia Barker (against Norway)
- (Republic of Ireland) Megan Connolly (against Canada)
- (Spain) Laia Codina (against Switzerland)

Source: ESPN

=== Discipline ===
A player was automatically suspended for the next match for the following offences:

- Receiving a red card (red card suspensions could be extended for serious offences)
- Receiving two yellow cards in two matches; yellow cards expired after the completion of the quarter-finals (yellow card suspensions were not carried forward to any other future international matches)

The following suspensions were served during the tournament:

Player	Offence(s)	Suspension
(Nigeria) Deborah Abiodun	(red card) in Group B vs Canada (matchday 1; 21 July)	Group B vs Australia (matchday 2; 27 July); Group B vs Republic of Ireland (matchday 3; 31 July); Round of 16 vs England (7 August)
(Zambia) Catherine Musonda	(yellow card) (yellow-red card) in Group C vs Japan (matchday 1; 22 July)	Group C vs Spain (matchday 2; 26 July)
(Jamaica) Khadija Shaw	(yellow card) (yellow-red card) in Group F vs France (matchday 1; 23 July)	Group F vs Panama (matchday 2; 29 July)
(Argentina) Miriam Mayorga	(yellow card) in Group G vs Italy (matchday 1; 24 July); (yellow card) in Group G vs South Africa (matchday 2; 28 July)	Group G vs Sweden (matchday 3; 2 August)
(South Africa) Kholosa Biyana	(yellow card) in Group G vs Sweden (matchday 1; 23 July); (yellow card) in Group G vs Argentina (matchday 2; 28 July)	Group G vs Italy (matchday 3; 2 August)
(China) Zhang Rui	(red card) in Group D vs Haiti (matchday 2; 28 July)	Group D vs England (matchday 3; 1 August)
(Philippines) Sofia Harrison	(red card) in Group A vs Norway (matchday 3; 30 July)	Suspension served outside tournament
(United States) Rose Lavelle	(yellow card) in Group E vs Netherlands (matchday 2; 27 July); (yellow card) in Group E vs Portugal (matchday 3; 1 August)	Round of 16 vs Sweden (6 August)
(Colombia) Manuela Vanegas	(yellow card) in Group H vs South Korea (matchday 2; 25 July); (yellow card) in Group H vs Morocco (matchday 3; 3 August)	Round of 16 vs Jamaica (8 August)
(Netherlands) Daniëlle van de Donk	(yellow card) in Group E vs Portugal (matchday 1; 23 July); (yellow card) in Round of 16 vs South Africa (6 August)	Quarter-finals vs Spain (11 August)
(England) Lauren James	(red card) in Round of 16 vs Nigeria (7 August)	Quarter-finals vs Colombia (12 August); Semi-finals vs Australia (16 August)
(Spain) Oihane Hernández	(yellow card) in Group C vs Japan (matchday 3; 31 July); (yellow card) in Quarter-finals vs Netherlands (11 August)	Semi-finals vs Sweden (15 August)

=== Tournament ranking ===
Per statistical convention in football, matches decided in extra time are counted as wins and losses, while matches decided by penalty shoot-outs are counted as draws.

Pos	Grp	Team	Pld	W	D	L	GF	GA	GD	Pts	Final result
1	C	Spain	7	6	0	1	18	7	+11	18	Champions
2	D	England	7	5	1	1	13	4	+9	16	Runners-up
3	G	Sweden	7	5	1	1	14	4	+10	16	Third place
4	B	Australia (H)	7	3	1	3	10	8	+2	10	Fourth place
5	C	Japan	5	4	0	1	15	3	+12	12	Eliminated in quarter-finals
6	F	France	5	3	2	0	12	4	+8	11	Eliminated in quarter-finals
7	E	Netherlands	5	3	1	1	12	3	+9	10	Eliminated in quarter-finals
8	H	Colombia	5	3	0	2	6	4	+2	9	Eliminated in quarter-finals
9	E	United States	4	1	3	0	4	1	+3	6	Eliminated in round of 16
10	B	Nigeria	4	1	3	0	3	2	+1	6	Eliminated in round of 16
11	D	Denmark	4	2	0	2	3	3	0	6	Eliminated in round of 16
12	H	Morocco	4	2	0	2	2	10	−8	6	Eliminated in round of 16
13	F	Jamaica	4	1	2	1	1	1	0	5	Eliminated in round of 16
14	A	Switzerland	4	1	2	1	3	5	−2	5	Eliminated in round of 16
15	A	Norway	4	1	1	2	7	4	+3	4	Eliminated in round of 16
16	G	South Africa	4	1	1	2	6	8	−2	4	Eliminated in round of 16
17	H	Germany	3	1	1	1	8	3	+5	4	Eliminated in group stage
18	F	Brazil	3	1	1	1	5	2	+3	4	Eliminated in group stage
19	E	Portugal	3	1	1	1	2	1	+1	4	Eliminated in group stage
20	A	New Zealand (H)	3	1	1	1	1	1	0	4	Eliminated in group stage
21	B	Canada	3	1	1	1	2	5	−3	4	Eliminated in group stage
22	G	Italy	3	1	0	2	3	8	−5	3	Eliminated in group stage
23	D	China	3	1	0	2	2	7	−5	3	Eliminated in group stage
24	A	Philippines	3	1	0	2	1	8	−7	3	Eliminated in group stage
25	C	Zambia	3	1	0	2	3	11	−8	3	Eliminated in group stage
26	B	Republic of Ireland	3	0	1	2	1	3	−2	1	Eliminated in group stage
27	G	Argentina	3	0	1	2	2	5	−3	1	Eliminated in group stage
28	H	South Korea	3	0	1	2	1	4	−3	1	Eliminated in group stage
29	D	Haiti	3	0	0	3	0	4	−4	0	Eliminated in group stage
30	C	Costa Rica	3	0	0	3	1	8	−7	0	Eliminated in group stage
31	F	Panama	3	0	0	3	3	11	−8	0	Eliminated in group stage
32	E	Vietnam	3	0	0	3	0	12	−12	0	Eliminated in group stage

Source: FIFA
(H) Hosts

== Marketing ==
=== Branding ===
The official emblem was jointly designed by Toronto-based studio Public Address and Los Angeles-based Works Creative Agency and unveiled on 28 October 2021 during a live show. The emblem featured a football encircled by 32 coloured squares, reflecting the expanded field of the tournament, and the natural terrains of the two host nations. The overall branding of the tournament featured designs reflecting the host nations' Indigenous peoples, created by Australian Kalkatungu artist Chern'ee Sutton and Māori artist Fiona Collis. Furthermore, the tournament's branding also incorporated the native names of all host cities. Alongside the emblem, the official slogan of the tournament, "Beyond Greatness", reflected FIFA's goal for the event to further expand the prominence of women's football, was also revealed. The names of the host cities in their native names (the local Australian Aboriginal languages and Māori in New Zealand) were used as part of the official branding.

=== Ticketing ===
Approximately 1.4 million tickets were sold or distributed by 19 July 2023, setting a new tournament record. Sluggish sales in New Zealand resulted in 20,000 free tickets being issued by sponsor Xero.

=== Merchandise ===
FIFA 23 featured the 2023 FIFA Women's World Cup mode; the video game update was released on 27 June 2023, replicating the 2023 FIFA Women's World Cup tournament and featuring the 32 qualified teams.

=== Broadcasting rights ===
The 2023 Women's World Cup was the first Women's World Cup to have its broadcasting rights sold as a standalone product rather than being packaged as a bonus of purchasing broadcasting rights for the Men's World Cup. FIFA stated that they saw "huge interest" in the separate bidding process and hoped for more regional partners to sign on. FIFA set an aim to reach a global audience of 2 billion, up from 1.12 billion at the previous edition of the tournament in France.

In October 2022, FIFA rejected multiple bids from various public and private broadcasters for what it described as significantly under-priced bids, urging broadcasters to bid more, saying it is what the women's game deserves. Some European broadcasters were concerned about the timezone difference affecting viewership figures, something that was not an issue with the France-hosted 2019 Women's World Cup, while Gianni Infantino threatened a media blackout for Europe's "big five" (United Kingdom, France, Germany, Italy, Spain) if they did not offer more. The issue was resolved by the middle of June 2023, five weeks before the tournament, with all territories having deals. A deal between Japanese broadcaster NHK and FIFA was announced for the last uncovered major market a week before start of the tournament.

=== Sponsorship ===
FIFA partners	FIFA Women's Football partners	FIFA Women's World Cup sponsors	Asia and Pacific supporters	European supporters	North American supporters	South American supporters
Adidas; Coca-Cola; Hyundai-Kia; Qatar Airways; Wanda Group	Visa; Xero	AB InBev; Algorand; Booking.com; Globant; Mengniu Dairy; McDonald's; Unilever	Cisco; CommBank; Jacob's Creek; Optus; TAB New Zealand; Team Global Express; Yadea; Bellamy's Organic	Hublot	BMO; Frito-Lay; GEICO	Claro; Estrela Bet; Inter Rapidísimo; Itaú Unibanco

== Symbols ==
=== Mascot ===
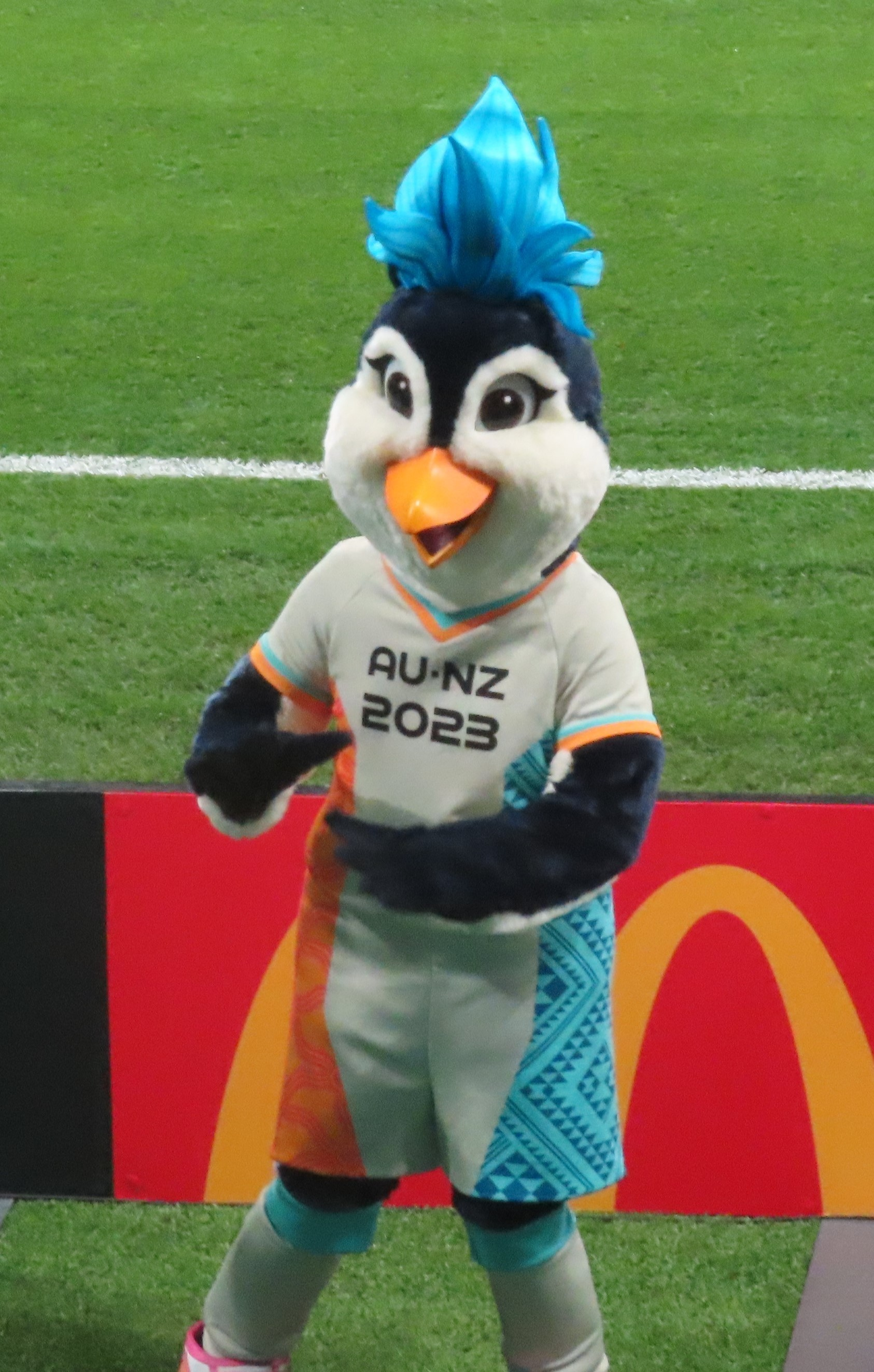
A mascot in Tazuni costume

The tournament's official mascot was unveiled on 19 October 2022. The mascot's name is Tazuni, which is a portmanteau of the Tasman Sea and "Unity". She is a little penguin (Eudyptula minor), endemic to New Zealand — FIFA incorrectly stated this penguin (E. minor) was endemic in Australia, where a closely related species (Eudyptula novaehollandiae) was described as new and distinct in 2016.

=== Match ball ===
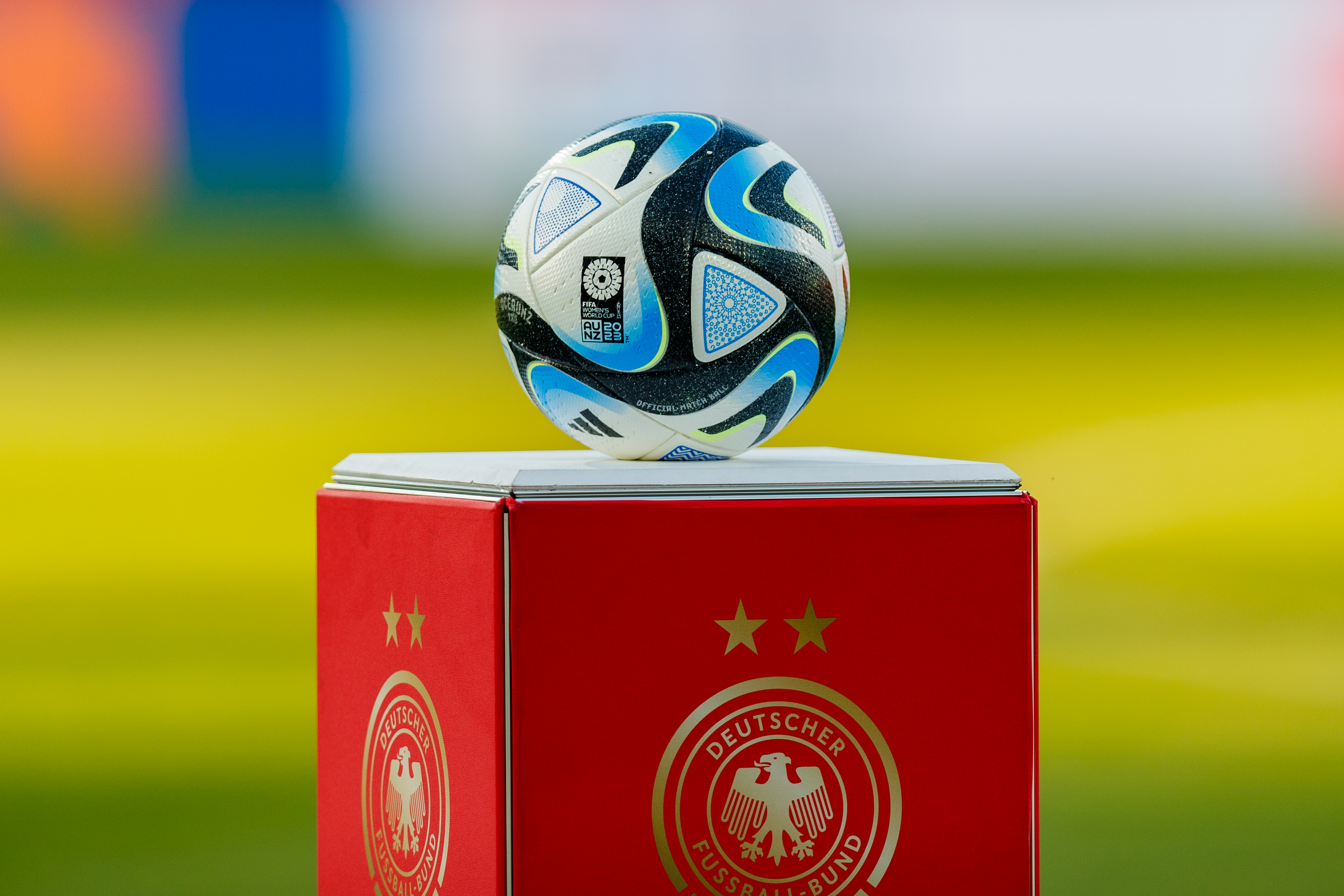
Adidas Oceaunz

On 24 January 2023, The word "Oceaunz" was unveiled as the official match ball for the tournament by Adidas.

Oceaunz's design was inspired by the unique natural landscapes of the two host nations, with visuals nodding to the vast mountains of New Zealand and Australia's connection with the Indian Ocean. Its name was a portmanteau based on the tournament's geographical location: Oceania, Australia, and New Zealand. Oceaunz featured the same connected ball technology as was seen in Qatar at the 2022 FIFA World Cup. This provided precise ball data, which was made available to video assistant referees in real-time. It was previously used at the 2023 FIFA U-20 World Cup.

The match ball for the semi-finals, third place match, and final, the Oceaunz Final Pro, was revealed on 14 August 2023. It differed from the regular Oceaunz with an orange and gold colouration, reflecting the sunsets across the Sydney skyline, where the final was held.

=== Music ===
There were several official songs for the 2023 Women's World Cup. The official theme song, "Unity" by British DJ and music producer Kelly Lee Owens, was released on 28 October 2021 at the same time as the official emblem and slogan unveiling. An instrumental song with non-lyric vocals, it was played at half-time of every match. On 29 June 2023, the official song of the tournament, "Do It Again" by New Zealand singer Benee and Australian singer Mallrat, and its lyric video were released. In July 2023, the "official walk-out track" for the matches at the tournament was revealed to be "Bring It On" by Australian singer Tones and I, American rapper BIA and French-Senegalese singer-songwriter Diarra Sylla.

Other songs were independently produced for the tournament. The Nike player commercials "Let It Rip", depicting Megan Rapinoe as an All-American Hero, and "Like a Lioness", showcasing the England team, featured original songs. The latter (also called "Like a Lioness") was performed by Ms Banks, who had previously performed the theme song of the BBC's coverage of the 2019 Women's World Cup. A supergroup of female artists, Hope FC, also released "Call Me a Lioness", an anthemic song inspired by the England team (better known as the Lionesses). Hope FC featured British musicians including Melanie C, Self Esteem, Alex Greenwood of Sports Team, Olivia Dean, Ellie Rowsell of Wolf Alice, and Shura (a former youth player herself).

== Progressive actions ==
=== Indigenous flags and names ===
Football Australia CEO James Johnson indicated early on in planning that displaying flags representing Indigenous Australians and Indigenous New Zealanders was important to the host nations, and were discussing with FIFA whether this would be permitted at the same time as they and others were discussing captain's armbands. A captain's armband highlighting rights for Indigenous peoples was approved by FIFA in June 2023, with Australian Aboriginal and Torres Strait Islander flags (Australian Aboriginal flag and Torres Strait Islander flag), and New Zealand Māori flag (Tino Rangatiratanga) approved in July 2023. The extended wait for approval, especially after the armband decision had been announced, prompted Football Australia to seek further clarification. FIFA permitted the relevant flags to be flown alongside the national flags of Australia and New Zealand at all venues, giving them the same prominent status upon recommendation from Indigenous consultants and the governments of both host nations. Previously, the Australia team displaying the Aboriginal flag before matches had caused controversy.

Australian Aboriginal flag

Tino Rangatiratanga

In a sign of respect for the traditional custodians of the land, indigenous names for the host cities were used alongside the English names in branding.

=== Player advocacy ===
==== Climate action ====
On 13 July 2023, a group of 44 players, led by Denmark's Sofie Junge Pedersen and facilitated by Common Goal and Football for Future, announced that they would combat the carbon footprint of the teams' flights to Australia and New Zealand by donating to "climate resilience and carbon offsetting initiatives" organised by the World Wildlife Fund and DanChurchAid. Having donated to offset carbon emissions every time her team required flights for five years before the 2023 Women's World Cup, Junge Pedersen decided to reach out to her national and club teammates to do the same when faced with the long flights to Australia and New Zealand and the prominence of the tournament. Announcing the initiative, she hoped other players would join them in donating before and during the World Cup. She and Canada's Jessie Fleming discussed their hope to leave a positive environmental impact, acknowledging that the donations were short-term fixes for one issue, and their hope that there will be more climate-positive developments in football.

The group of players also petitioned football governing bodies to make carbon concerns a more important factor in the bidding processes for future tournaments. The initiative was considered the biggest player-led climate campaign in football, especially with the 44 players coming from a variety of nations and working together. The player donations were also matched by a third party.

==== Germany grassroots ====
Also facilitated by Common Goal, the Germany team announced before their opening match that they would donate 1% of their FIFA-guaranteed earnings from the tournament to Futbalo Girls and Girl Power, grassroots football programmes for young girls and non-binary people.

=== UN Women partnership ===
The day before the tournament began, UN Women announced that it had partnered with FIFA for the Women's World Cup "to celebrate the skills and achievements of the teams and players, to advance gender equality in football, and to prevent abuse and discrimination on and off the field." The initiative was also to highlight gender inequality issues during the tournament, with a joint campaign for everyone to recognise gender equality as a fundamental human right and to call for an end to violence against women and girls.

== Issues ==
=== Controversies ===
There were various controversies relating to the 2023 FIFA Women's World Cup, with a main focus on players from a variety of teams going public about disputes with their respective football associations over various elements of professionalism, collective bargaining and development that they felt were not being met.

There were also controversies reacting to unpopular decisions made by FIFA: player welfare was a concern; the potential sponsorship of the tournament by Saudi Arabia was criticised and eventually dropped; the amount of money that the Big Five bid for broadcasting rights was criticised by FIFA, which in turn was lambasted for hypocrisy; and the inconsistency of the qualification system, in particular widespread condemnation by FIFPRO against confederations other than UEFA for failure to organise separate qualification campaigns unrelated to continental championships, was criticised.

After FIFA experienced criticism for specifically banning OneLove captain's armbands hours before the 2022 Men's World Cup, it spent months in discussion with the women's teams to communicate on the matter. Both rainbow and OneLove armbands were banned at the Women's World Cup, with a similar FIFA-designed armband instead made available by the organisation.

After Spain won the Women's World Cup, former Royal Spanish Football Federation (RFEF) President Luis Rubiales forcibly kissed a Spanish footballer, Jenni Hermoso, and breached the Article 13 of FIFA Disciplinary Code. Rubiales was banned by the FIFA Disciplinary Committee from engaging in any football-related activities at both national and international level for three years.

=== Auckland shootings ===
The opening match of the Women's World Cup took place in Auckland, New Zealand, on 20 July; on the morning of the match, a gunman killed multiple people in the Auckland CBD. The fatal attack "cast a shadow" over the tournament. Football Australia said the shooting was not motivated by the World Cup. It took place near the hotel (M Social) where Norway, who played New Zealand in the opening match, were staying. The FIFA Fan Festival which was scheduled to take place nearby to the shooting location was cancelled, while the Italy team, who were also staying in a nearby hotel, could not leave to attend training due to police cordons. NZ FIFA Head Office was also located and based in offices directly over the road from the shooting. Moments of silence were observed on matchday one in respect to the victims of the shooting; security at and around Eden Park, the location of the opening match in Auckland, was heightened, with a statement saying this measure was taken for "reassurance". The players also wore black armbands and stadium flags were flown at half mast for both opening games. After New Zealand won the opening match in a surprise victory, Ali Riley paid tribute to the victims, saying that the team had "wanted to bring something amazing" in response to the shooting.

Another fatal shooting in the Auckland CBD, on the same street, occurred on 3 August; considered an unrelated and isolated incident, one person was killed and the perpetrator fled the scene after a fight broke out.

=== Pullman hotel fire ===
The New Zealand team's base camp was at the Pullman Auckland Hotel & Apartments. At 7:48 pm on 22 July, the players and staff had to evacuate after fires broke out in multiple locations around the hotel due to a suspected arson attack; they were later allowed to return. Four people were treated for smoke inhalation, while Fire and Emergency New Zealand deemed the incident suspicious. New Zealand Football said that the fire was not connected to the shooting two days earlier. The security around the New Zealand team was increased, and a man was arrested on suspicion of burglary and arson.
