= Michael McBride (soccer coach) =

Australian youth football coach (born 1975)

Personal information
- Full name: Michael McBride
- Date of birth: 25 September 1975 (age 51)
- Place of birth: Blenheim, New Zealand
- Height: 1.83 m (6 ft 0 in)
- Position: Midfielder

Team information
- Current team: Australia national under-17 soccer team (assistant coach); Australia national soccer team (Technical Analyst)

Michael McBride (Football Coach) is an Australian youth football (soccer) coach who presently holds the position of assistant coach at Australia national under-17 soccer team and technical analyst of the Socceroos. He is part of a new generation of youth coaches in Australia that focus on developing the relationship between technique and intelligence.

== Biography ==
He retired from playing at an early age of 27, switching to focus on his coaching career. Whilst still playing, he completed a Bachelor of Sports Coaching at University of Canberra and Masters of Business (Sport Management) at Deakin University.

== Playing career ==
As a teenager, McBride was developed at Newcastle Breakers FC, part of the old National Soccer League. He had a short professional stint in Indonesia for Arema Malang in 1995–96 Liga Indonesia Premier Division. He retired at 27 to focus on his coaching career.

== Coaching career ==
=== FFV state teams ===
He has worked extensively within the Talented Player Program at Football Federation Victoria since 2007. He was head coach of U13, U14 and U15 Boys Victorian State Teams. McBride is also Head Trainer at Football Technique School since 2005.

=== FFV National Training Centre ===
In 2013, he was appointed assistant coach at FFV NTC, focusing on preparing Boys 14–16 years of age for the Australia national under-17 soccer team and FFA Centre of Excellence. Additionally, McBride conducts opposition and match analysis for the FFV NTC. In 2013, the FFV NTC Boys were crowned national champions for the first time, winning the FFA State Institute Challenge. In 2014, the FFV NTC Boys won the FFA State Institute Challenge for the second year in a row. In 2015, 10 players from FFV NTC were identified to trial for the Australia national under-17 soccer team. In December 2015, the FFV NTC participated in the new format of the FFA State Institute Challenge, finishing with 5 wins and a draw from the 6 matches, taking the combined results over the past 3 years in the FFA State Institute Challenge to 21 wins, 2 draws and 1 loss from 24 matches.

=== Socceroos - Senior National Team ===
In 2015, McBride commenced scouting opposition teams for the Socceroos prior to the start of the 2018 FIFA World Cup qualification – AFC second round, which included trips to Kyrgyzstan and Jordan. He subsequently joined the Socceroos staff as a technical analyst for the 2018 FIFA World Cup qualification – AFC third round, the 2017 FIFA Confederations Cup in Russia and qualification for the 2018 FIFA World Cup, including the playoffs against Syria and Honduras. McBride continued as technical analyst in Russia, competing in 2018 FIFA World Cup Group C, included matches against France national football team, Denmark national football team and Peru national football team.

=== Joeys - U17 National Team ===
In 2017, McBride was appointed assistant coach of the Australia national under-17 soccer team, that qualified for the 2018 AFC U-16 Championship. The Joeys topped their group at the 2018 AFC U-16 Championship qualification tournament in Mongolia.

=== Emerging Matildas ===
In 2019, McBride was appointed as the head coach of the Emerging Matildas, a program established to identify and prepare players for the Australia women's national soccer team.

== Honours ==
=== Team honours ===
- FFA State Institute Challenge National Champions: 2

2013, 2014

- 2018 AFC U-16 Championship qualification Group I Winners

2017

=== Personal honours ===
- Football Federation Victoria Champions League - Boys Coach of the Year: 1

2011

- Football Federation Australia National Championships - FFA All Star Coach Award: 1

2010
