= Japan 2023 FIFA Women's World Cup bid =

Football World Cup host nation bid

Japan bid
- for the 2023 FIFA Women's World Cup
- Japan 2023 bid logo

Bid details
- Bidding nation: Japan
- Bidding federation: Japan Football Association
- Proposed venues: 8 (in 8 cities)

Bid result
- Withdrawn on 22 June 2020

Official website
- japan2023bid.com

The Japan bid for the 2023 FIFA Women's World Cup was a bid to host the 2023 FIFA Women's World Cup by Japan Football Association (JFA). The single bid was announced on 12 December 2019. The bid entailed 8 venues in 8 host cities, with a final to have been played in Tokyo at the New National Stadium. The bid was withdrawn on 22 June 2020, with the JFA indicating support for the Australia-New Zealand bid.

== Background ==
Japan have considered bidding on the tournament after declining their initial intention to bid on the 2019 FIFA Women's World Cup. Japan Football Association vice president Kozo Tashima is reported to have said that the facilities will be renovated and ready for the World Cup. On 20 February 2019, The Japan Football Association announced that it will go forward with a long-planned bid to host the 2023 Women's World Cup. On 5 July 2019 Japan unveiled its bid logo along with the slogan "Time to Fly". The bid included eight stadiums, including several venues that were used during the 2020 Summer Olympics football tournament.

== Proposed venues ==
The following host cities, venues and capacities were included in the Bid Book submitted to FIFA:

Shinjuku, Tokyo	Suita, Osaka	Saitama City	Kobe, Hyōgo
National Stadium	Suita City Football Stadium	Saitama Stadium	Kobe Misaki Stadium
Capacity: 80,016	Capacity: 40,000	Capacity: 62,000	Capacity: 30,000
Kyoto City	Japan 2023 FIFA Women's World Cup bid is located in Japan		
Kyoto Stadium	Japan 2023 FIFA Women's World Cup bid is located in Japan		
Capacity: 22,000	Japan 2023 FIFA Women's World Cup bid is located in Japan		
Sendai, Miyagi	Japan 2023 FIFA Women's World Cup bid is located in Japan		
Sendai Stadium	Japan 2023 FIFA Women's World Cup bid is located in Japan		
Capacity: 19,694	Japan 2023 FIFA Women's World Cup bid is located in Japan		
Sapporo, Hokkaido	Japan 2023 FIFA Women's World Cup bid is located in Japan		
Sapporo Dome	Japan 2023 FIFA Women's World Cup bid is located in Japan		
Capacity: 42,000	Japan 2023 FIFA Women's World Cup bid is located in Japan		
Toyota, Aichi	Japan 2023 FIFA Women's World Cup bid is located in Japan		
Toyota Stadium	Japan 2023 FIFA Women's World Cup bid is located in Japan		
Capacity: 45,000	Japan 2023 FIFA Women's World Cup bid is located in Japan		

== Withdrawal ==
The JFA withdrew their bid to host the tournament on 22 June 2020, citing Brazil's withdrawal as unifying the CONMEBOL vote for Colombia, ASEAN Football Federation's backing of Australia and New Zealand, and the unlikelihood of their bid being successful due to the delayed Tokyo 2020 women's football tournament. The JFA also suggested that without the burden of hosting the tournament, they could provide more resources to their national team in the hope of winning the tournament.

== See also ==
- 2019 FIFA Women's World Cup
