= Archie Fraser =

- Born: Archibald Hugh Fraser; 10 April 1959; Scotland

Archibald Hugh Fraser is an Australian based business executive, was born 10 April 1959 in Scotland.

== Career ==
Fraser played professional association football for Greenock Morton before moving to Australia in 1980 to play in Brisbane.

From 1996 to 1999 Fraser was a senior executive with global recruitment company Adecco as A & NZ CEO. In 1999, he joined as a partner and CEO of Melbourne-based HR consulting practice Hamilton Watts International (HWI) with operations in Australia, Singapore, Malaysia and the United Kingdom. In July 2000 the NYSE listed Cendant Corporation acquired HWI. Following the acquisition, Fraser joined Cendant Mobility as Managing Director Asia Pacific, reporting to the US as Australian director.

Fraser was appointed to the executive of AFL Club St Kilda FC in 2005 and appointed as the Saints CEO in 2006 where he led the club through a period of significant restructure, improvement and change, including the appointment of a new Senior Coach Ross Lyon and the transition to the Greg Westaway leadership and Footy First Board. Both events were significant milestones in the stability and direction of the Saints both on and off the field from 2006 to 2010. The club played in both the 2009 & 2010 Grand Finals. In 2009 Fraser was appointed as head of the Hyundai A-League. Fraser announced his resignation as head of the Hyundai A-League in 2010 to move back into his consulting business which has a focus on medi tech, sports tech, commercialisation and strategy.

In 2016 Fraser was appointed as CEO to turn around the ASX listed Meditech company Optiscan Ltd (OIL) where between 2016 and 2018 he successfully increased the market capitalisation from $4 m to $55 million and the share price from 2c to a 52-week high of 13c. During this time Optiscan collaborated with Carl Zeiss Meditec to deliver a breakthrough product to the Neurosurgery market following the achievement of the required QA, CE and FDA testing process.

== St Kilda Football Club ==
Fraser joined the St Kilda Football Club in 2005 after consulting assignments with the club over the previous four years before being appointed CEO on 1 July 2006.

=== Frankston Training Facility ===
One of Fraser's legacies at the Saints was managing the club's move and negotiating the right deal for their new fully funded training and administration facilities to Frankston. This facility and the overall deal was rated as the top facility development project by the AFL with the lowest cost to the club over a 10- and 20-year projection period compared to all other AFL facility projects at the time. The AFL rated the Saints deal over a 20-year period as $6 m better than the average and $10 m better than the most costly club deal. The deal however, wasn't without its drawbacks. Nick Riewoldt, one of St.Kilda's most lauded players, is on record as saying that the club's move to Seaford in 2011 "crushed" the playing group.

Despite speculation linking Fraser with a move back to the Gold Coast, as the new CEO of the AFL Club GC17, he repeatedly stated his loyalty to St Kilda., and eventually left the sport of AFL in 2009.

== Football Federation Australia, Football Australia rebel body and Macarthur FC ==
In March 2009, Fraser joined Football Federation Australia as the Head Of The A-League. He remained in the position until June 2010.

In 2012 he took up a position with Clive Palmer's 'rebel' organisation Football Australia following the cancellation of Palmer's license to run the Gold Coast United FC A-League club. Football Australia was only active for a short period of time in 2012 before it became defunct, this rebel organisation should not be confused with the FFA despite that organisation renaming itself to Football Australia in 2020.

He began an independent sports consulting firm after leaving and continued in that role until joining newly formed A-League club Macarthur FC in 2019. He stayed at the new football club for 6 months then left after initial owner Lang Walker sold his position to another board member.

== Health Sector ==
After leaving the sports sector, he began working for Nico.lab, a Dutch health company using computer algorithms to detect and diagnose stroke in humans.
