= Brazil 2027 FIFA Women's World Cup bid =

Football World Cup host nation bid

Brazil bid
- for the 2027 FIFA Women's World Cup

Bid details
- Bidding nation: Brazil
- Bidding federation: Brazilian Football Confederation
- Proposed venues: 11 (in 11 cities)

The Brazil bid for the 2027 FIFA Women's World Cup is a successful bid to host the 2027 FIFA Women's World Cup by Brazilian Football Confederation (CBF). The single bid will be announced on 17 May 2024. The bid entailed 10 venues in 10 host cities. The bid book was submitted on 9 December 2023. The slogan of the bid is titled: "A Natural Choice".

== Background ==
The Brazilian Football Confederation (CBF), along with the city hall of Rio de Janeiro, have expressed interest in participating in the election for the 2027 World Cup. The country was already one of the finalists for the 2023 edition, but had to withdraw its candidacy due to the lack of support from the federal government, in addition to the financial crisis caused by the COVID-19 pandemic. The project is part of a study carried out by the Rio Convention & Visitors Bureau (RCV), which also makes possible other events with Olympic sports and FIFA tournaments in Rio de Janeiro until 2032, including the 2031 Pan American Games, using the city again as host (since it hosted the competition in 2007), reusing the structures used in the 2016 Summer Olympics and Paralympics.

It also highlighted the experience of hosting major events, such as the 1950 and 2014 FIFA World Cup, 2007 Pan American Games and 2007 Parapan American Games, 2016 Summer Olympics and 2016 Summer Paralympic Games, as well events like the 2000 FIFA Club World Championship, the 2013 FIFA Confederations Cup, the 2019 Copa América and the 2021 Copa América as a replacement of Argentina and Colombia due to COVID-19 pandemic in South America.

== Proposed venues ==
On 1 March 2023, the city of São Paulo expressed interest in participating in the election with Rio de Janeiro, offering the Arena Corinthians and Allianz Parque to receive the matches. The next day, CBF President Ednaldo Rodrigues sent a letter to FIFA, confirming the country's intention to compete in the 2027 World Cup. Other Brazilian cities can also participate in the project, as the event involves the entire country. On 7 March the Brazilian Minister of Sports, Ana Moser, confirmed the country's bid to host the tournament. Then, the cities of Salvador, Brasília, Cuiabá, Belém, Manaus and Fortaleza also offered to host the World Cup in an event on SAFs and the football capital market, organized by the Getúlio Vargas Foundation (FGV) on 11 March. Among the capitals that offered, only Belém did not host the last men's World Cup in the country in 2014, losing its place to Manaus.

On 28 September 2023, the CBF confirmed the cities of Belo Horizonte, Brasília, Cuiabá, Fortaleza, Porto Alegre, Recife, Rio de Janeiro, São Paulo and Salvador as the capitals that will make up the official Brazilian candidacy document, with Belém leaving the project and the inclusion of the capital of Minas Gerais and Rio Grande do Sul, increasing the number of candidates for the World Cup to ten. The locations are similar to those of the 2014 men's edition, but without the inclusion of Curitiba and Natal in future matches.

| Rio de Janeiro | Brasília | Belo Horizonte | Fortaleza |
|---|---|---|---|
| Estádio do Maracanã | Estádio Nacional Mané Garrincha | Estádio Mineirão | Arena Castelão |
| Capacity: 73,139 | Capacity: 69,910 | Capacity: 66,658 | Capacity: 57,876 |
| Porto Alegre | Proposed cities. | | |
| Estádio Beira-Rio | Proposed cities. | | |
| Capacity: 49,055 | Proposed cities. | | |
| Salvador | Proposed cities. | | |
| Arena Fonte Nova | Proposed cities. | | |
| Capacity: 47,915 | Proposed cities. | | |
| Paraná (state) | | | |
| Arena da Baixada | | | |
| 42,232 | | | |
| São Paulo | Recife | Manaus | Cuiabá |
| Arena Corinthians | Arena Pernambuco | Arena da Amazônia | Arena Pantanal |
| Capacity: 47,252 | Capacity: 45,440 | Capacity: 42,924 | Capacity: 42,788 |

== See also ==
- Brazil 2023 FIFA Women's World Cup bid
