= Australia–New Zealand 2023 FIFA Women's World Cup bid =

Football World Cup host nation bid

Australia–New Zealand bid
- for the 2023 FIFA Women's World Cup
- Australia–New Zealand 2023 bid logo

Bid details
- Bidding nations: Australia; New Zealand
- Bidding federations: Football Federation Australia; New Zealand Football
- Proposed venues: 13 (in 12 cities)
- Bidding decision: 25 June 2020 in an online meeting of the FIFA Council

Bid result
- Successful – 22 votes of 35

Official website
- asone2023.com

The Australia–New Zealand bid for the 2023 FIFA Women's World Cup, also known as the AsOne bid, was the successful bid to host the 2023 FIFA Women's World Cup made by Football Federation Australia (FFA) and New Zealand Football (NZF). The joint bid was announced on 12 December 2019, combining an already launched effort from Australia that began on 29 October 2018. The bid entailed 13 venues in 12 host cities, with a final played in Sydney at Stadium Australia.

== Background ==
After successfully staging the 2015 AFC Asian Cup, speculation that FFA would bid to host a World Cup in Australia intensified. A joint announcement signalling the intent to bid for the 2023 FIFA Women's World Cup was made by the Federal Government and FFA on 13 June 2017.

FFA previously showed interest in bidding for the 2003 FIFA Women's World Cup but ultimately lost despite being one of two "excellent bids" with the FIFA Committee for Women's Football deciding to recommend China. Similar circumstances saw FFA show interest in bidding for the 2011 edition, however then-CEO Ben Buckley submitted a formal letter to FIFA withdrawing from the formal bidding process.

With the release of the Whole of Football Plan in 2014, the FFA referenced bidding for a FIFA Women's World Cup as part of the women's football 10 year strategy. A breakthrough year in 2017 for the Matildas, who claimed the inaugural 2017 Tournament of Nations, increased support for a potential bid. A series of friendly matches against Brazil and China in late 2017 attracted approximately 50,000 fans to see the Matildas, who were subsequently voted by the public as the "Team of the Year" at the AIS Awards.

=== Bid development ===
On 13 June 2017, the Australian Government provided $1 million initial funding for a feasibility study of the chances of a bid being successful. Prime Minister Malcolm Turnbull voiced his government's support for the bid, stating that the Matildas "are wonderful role models for young women and girls right across Australia." A further $4 million was provided on 6 February 2018 by the federal government, which FFA CEO David Gallop proclaimed would "bring enormous benefits to the Australian community, not only promoting healthy, active lifestyles but inclusion and gender equality." Premier of NSW Gladys Berejiklian launched plans to attract some of the biggest sporting events in the world to NSW over the next decade, which includes the 2023 FIFA Women's World Cup.

The bid was officially launched on 29 October 2018 with the campaign slogan "#GetOnside". The bid logo and slogan "Limitless" was launched on 7 July 2019. The logo stylizes the blue-green outlines to form Australia with a football.

== Addition of New Zealand to bid ==
With FIFA's plan to expand the field to 32 teams, a joint Australian–New Zealand bid was announced to be under consideration in July 2019. On 10 December 2019, shortly before the FIFA bid deadline, FFA and NZF announced an agreement to submit a joint bid with 13 stadiums in 12 host cities, the same day launched its bid logo in stylized football with a light blue "AU" curves symbolise Australia and a light green "NZ" also with curves symbolises New Zealand below 2023.

It was reported in 2019 that the countries would theoretically host four groups each (24 games each), and in the later stages, New Zealand would host 5 knockout games and Australia 11 games including the final at Stadium Australia in Sydney following its general renovation.

== FIFA football tournament hosting experiences ==
- Australia
  - 1981 FIFA World Youth Championship
  - 1993 World Youth Championship
- New Zealand
  - 1999 U-17 World Championship
  - 2008 U-17 Women's World Cup
  - 2015 U-20 World Cup

In addition, Australia also held the 1956 Olympic football tournament, the 2000 Olympic football tournament and the 2015 AFC Asian Cup

== Proposed venues ==
The following host cities, venues and capacities were included in the Bid Book submitted to FIFA:

=== Australia ===
Sydney		Brisbane	Melbourne
Stadium Australia	Sydney Football; Stadium	Brisbane Stadium (Lang Park)	Melbourne Cricket Ground
Capacity: 83,500	Capacity: 42,512	Capacity: 52,263	Capacity: 100,024
Australia–New Zealand 2023 FIFA Women's World Cup bid is located in Australia
Newcastle	Perth	Launceston	Adelaide
Newcastle Stadium	Perth Oval	York Park	Hindmarsh Stadium
Capacity: 25,945	Capacity: 22,225	Capacity: 22,065	Capacity: 18,435

=== New Zealand ===
Auckland	Wellington	Dunedin
Eden Park	Wellington Regional Stadium	Dunedin Stadium
Capacity: 48,276	Capacity: 39,000	Capacity: 28,744
Hamilton	Australia–New Zealand 2023 FIFA Women's World Cup bid is located in New Zealand	
Waikato Stadium	Australia–New Zealand 2023 FIFA Women's World Cup bid is located in New Zealand	
Capacity: 25,111	Australia–New Zealand 2023 FIFA Women's World Cup bid is located in New Zealand	
Christchurch	Australia–New Zealand 2023 FIFA Women's World Cup bid is located in New Zealand	
Christchurch Stadium	Australia–New Zealand 2023 FIFA Women's World Cup bid is located in New Zealand	
Capacity: 22,556	Australia–New Zealand 2023 FIFA Women's World Cup bid is located in New Zealand	

== Result ==
The Australia-New Zealand bid won hosting rights to the 2023 FIFA Women's World Cup on 25 June 2020. In a vote of 35 eligible members of the FIFA Council, the bid received 22 votes to Colombia's 13. FIFA President Gianni Infantino voted for the bid, alongside all council members from the Asian and Oceanian confederations, as well as those from CONCACAF and the Confederation of African Football. Council members from CONMEBOL and UEFA voted for the Colombian bid.

== See also ==
- 2019 FIFA Women's World Cup
