= Football Australia (defunct sporting federation) =

2012 short-lived soccer organising body

- Founded: March 2012 (inactive from June 2012)
- President: Clive Palmer

Football Australia was a short-lived attempt to create a rebel organising body for the sport of soccer in Australia. The attempt failed immediately as it was unable to gain official recognition from any Australian or international government or administration bodies and did not have any affiliated competitions under it.

It was founded in 2012 by Australian business man Clive Palmer after having his Gold Coast United A-League licence revoked by the FFA. Archie Fraser was the chairman and Clive Palmer was the president. Palmer quickly moved on to other ventures after holding a handful of public 'inquiries' and an abortive attempt to set up a 'rebel competition', leaving the organisation unfunded and defunct. Palmer's Football Australia's last public activity was in June 2012.

It was never officially recognised by FIFA or any other local or international bodies. The name "Football Australia" is now in use by the official governing body as the FFA renamed the organisation to "Football Australia" in December 2020.

== History ==
On 1 March 2012 Football Australia was launched by Australian mining magnate Clive Palmer with the slogan "We Kick Harder". It was originally announced that it was intended that the new federation would form a breakaway league and eventually replace the FFA and oversee football at a grassroots level and senior level. However, Palmer and FA's newly appointed chief executive, former A-League chief Archie Fraser, said the organisation was not necessarily out to topple the FFA but would act as watchdog and forum for ideas in the sport. It planned to publish papers, hold press conferences, seek opinions, lobby the government, lobby the FFA for a better outcome for Australians and the game in Australia.

Soon after the announcement many A-League clubs published statements rubbishing Palmer's new venture. Melbourne Heart CEO Scott Munn stated "Our position is clear - we've signed a clubs participation agreement to enter the A-League run and operated by Football Federation Australia" while Perth Glory owner Tony Sage declined to comment after previously supporting Clive Palmer. Sources from Sydney FC and Brisbane Roar also confirmed their intention of staying with the FFA.

It was also reported that Palmer tried to persuade a number of young Gold Coast United players to defect and sign contracts with a proposed rebel competition; however, a number of senior players intervened.

On 2 March 2012 both the Asian Football Confederation and FIFA peak bodies publicly released a statement supporting Football Federation Australia saying that FIFA will only recognise one governing body in each FIFA affiliated nation and went on to say that "FIFA will continue its close cooperation with the FFA, however, we will also continue to monitor the situation".

On 13 March 2012 the federation launched a national commission of inquiry designed to hear submissions on ways to improve the sport’s administration and development. It was announced that the federation would hold hearings in Townsville, Newcastle, Canberra, Sydney, Melbourne, Hobart, Adelaide and Perth. The hearings were conducted by former president of FFSA Gary Collis with former Gold Coast United footballer Steve Fitzsimmons appointed secretary to the commission. A limited release of the inquiry occurred on 2 June 2012 and was the last act before it became defunct.

== FFA rename to Football Australia ==
In December 2020 the official body Football Federation Australia elected to rename itself to Football Australia who now host their website on the .com.au variant URL.

== See also ==
- Soccer in Australia
- Football Federation Australia
