= Brazil 2023 FIFA Women's World Cup bid =

Football World Cup host nation bid

Brazil bid
- for the 2023 FIFA Women's World Cup
- Brazil 2023 bid logo

Bid details
- Bidding nation: Brazil
- Bidding federation: Brazilian Football Confederation
- Proposed venues: 8 (in 8 cities)

Bid result
- Withdrawn on 8 June 2020

The Brazil bid for the 2023 FIFA Women's World Cup was a bid to host the 2023 FIFA Women's World Cup by Brazilian Football Confederation (CBF). The single bid was announced on 13 December 2019. The bid entailed 8 venues in 8 host cities, with a final to be played in Rio de Janeiro at the Maracanã Stadium. The CBF withdrew their bid on 8 June 2020.

== Background ==
Seeking the great popularity of women's football in the country, Brazil highlighted the high public in the Favelas Cup 2019, when it obtained 30 thousand people at the Pacaembu Stadium in São Paulo, in the competition that mixed male and female soccer aimed at young poor players during the grand finale. In addition, the presence of 40,000 people during the friendly against Mexico at Arena Corinthians, became the primary showcase for the success of Brazilian Women's Football.

It also highlighted the experience of hosting major events, such as the 1950 and 2014 FIFA World Cup, 2007 Pan American Games and 2007 Parapan American Games, 2016 Summer Olympics and 2016 Summer Paralympic Games, as well events like the 2000 FIFA Club World Championship, the 2013 FIFA Confederations Cup and the 2019 Copa América.

== Proposed venues ==
The following host cities, venues and capacities were included in the Bid Book submitted to FIFA. All the host cities and stadiums listed down were used at the 2014 FIFA World Cup.

Rio de Janeiro	Brasília	São Paulo	Belo Horizonte
Estádio do Maracanã	Estádio Nacional	Arena de São Paulo	Estádio Mineirão
Capacity: 74,738	Capacity: 69,432	Capacity: 49,205	Capacity: 58,259
Salvador	Brazil 2023 FIFA Women's World Cup bid is located in Brazil		
Arena Fonte Nova	Brazil 2023 FIFA Women's World Cup bid is located in Brazil		
Capacity: 51,708	Brazil 2023 FIFA Women's World Cup bid is located in Brazil		
Manaus	Brazil 2023 FIFA Women's World Cup bid is located in Brazil		
Arena da Amazônia	Brazil 2023 FIFA Women's World Cup bid is located in Brazil		
Capacity: 40,549	Brazil 2023 FIFA Women's World Cup bid is located in Brazil		
Porto Alegre	Brazil 2023 FIFA Women's World Cup bid is located in Brazil		
Estádio Beira-Rio	Brazil 2023 FIFA Women's World Cup bid is located in Brazil		
Capacity: 43,394	Brazil 2023 FIFA Women's World Cup bid is located in Brazil		
Recife	Brazil 2023 FIFA Women's World Cup bid is located in Brazil		
Arena Pernambuco (Note: The Arena Pernambuco is located in São Lourenço da Mata, Recife.)	Brazil 2023 FIFA Women's World Cup bid is located in Brazil		
Capacity: 42,583	Brazil 2023 FIFA Women's World Cup bid is located in Brazil		

== Withdrawal ==
The Brazilian Football Confederation withdrew their bid on 8 June 2020, citing an inability to provide federal government guarantees as a result of "economic and fiscal austerity" stemming from the COVID-19 pandemic in Brazil. The CBF threw their support behind the Colombian bid for the tournament. Brazil was bidding for the 2027 edition and it was successful.

== See also ==
- 2023 FIFA Women's World Cup
