= Indigenous New Zealanders =

Indigenous New Zealanders can refer to:

- Māori people, the native population of the main islands of New Zealand.
- Cook Islanders
- The Moriori people, of the Chatham Islands
