= James Johnson (sports administrator) =

Australian sports administrator and businessman

Personal information
- Date of birth: 21 May 1982 (age 44)
- Place of birth: Crewe, Cheshire, England

College career
Years	Team	Apps	(Gls)
2002–2005	Boston University Terriers	57	(13)

Senior career*
Years	Team	Apps	(Gls)
- Brisbane Strikers

International career
1998–1999	Australia U-17	13	(3)
- * Club domestic league appearances and goals

James Johnson (born 21 May 1982) is an Australian and British sports administrator and businessman.

He is the current Group CEO of Canadian Soccer Business and the Commissioner of the Canadian Premier League. Johnson was the CEO of Football Australia from January 2020 until he resigned in 2025. He is also a non-executive advisory board member of the Association Football Development Program Global chaired by Prince Ali bin Hussein of Jordan.

== Early life and education ==
Johnson was born in the United Kingdom to Australian parents who were working in the country. His parents returned to Australia when Johnson was six months old and he grew up in Rockhampton. At the age of 13, his family moved to Brisbane. He has a degree in business administration, minoring in finance, as well as a Juris Doctor in law. Johnson pursued his undergraduate degree at Boston University in Business and Finance. He then studied law at Bond University and graduated with Honours as Juris Doctor.

== Career ==
Johnson was a youth international soccer player for the Australia national under-17 soccer team. He was selected in the Australia squad for the 1999 FIFA U-17 World Championship but was cut ahead of the tournament due to injury. Between 2002 and 2005, Johnson played for Boston University Terriers, scoring 13 times in 57 matches. He continued playing at club level until 2007 for Brisbane Strikers and Danang FC.

After his retirement, Johnson began his legal career in the areas of corporate law, litigation, and industrial relations. Johnson then joined Professional Footballers Australia (PFA). Johnson worked for two years at this organization as a player relations executive. In 2011, Johnson was appointed as the director of international relations and development at The Asian Football Confederation in Malaysia. In 2013, Johnson moved to Zürich and joined FIFA as a senior manager of member associations. After two years in this post, Johnson was appointed as the head of professional football in 2015. He worked until 2018 at this position. After his exit from FIFA, Johnson joined the City Football Group in the UK as a senior vice president of external affairs.

Football Australia

In 2020, Johnson became the CEO of the Football Federation Australia.. Johnson led a commercial turnaround of Football Australia.

Johnson secured sponsorship deals with Commonwealth Bank Australia, Nike, Subway, CUPRA, LEGO, Coles, Priceline, MILO, Allianz, Qantas and Cadbury.

In 2020, Johnson secured a 1-year deal for the A-League with Fox Sports in what was described as a “game of chicken” allowing the league to resume a season postponed due to the pandemic. In 2021, Johnson acquired the AFC media rights for Australia, bundled them with the Matildas and Socceroos rights, and sold the combined package to Network 10 and Paramount+ in a landmark deal. In 2024, he re-acquired the Asian Football Confederation media rights, along with the 2027 FIFA Women’s World Cup rights, and again sold the package to Network 10 and Paramount+ in a record-breaking agreement.

Johnson advocated for a governance overhaul of Australia’s A-League from his first day in the office wanting to give the club’s more autonomy to own and operate the league under the ambit of Football Australia. On 31 December 2020, Johnson announced together with A-League Club Chairman Paul Lederer that Football Australia and the A-League clubs had agreed upon a new model following years of negotiations. The model provided the operational, commercial and marketing control of the A-League and regulatory control to Football Australia. Johnson has also focused on growing the brand and relevance of the FFA Cup (Australia’s open club knock-out competition) and has brought in strategic changes, including playing on free to air television and reallocating a slot to the Asian Champions League to the FFA Cup winner. As a next step in the evolution of Australian club football, Johnson has advocated publicly for a second-division club football competition and has set 2023 as the date for it to begin.

== Personal life ==
Johnson is married with three children and resides in Sydney, Australia.
