= FFA State Institute Challenge =

- Founded: 2009
- Region: Australia
- Teams: 9
- Current champions: FFV NTC
- Most championships: FFV NTC; NSWIS; SASI (2 Titles)
- Website: Home Page

The FFA State Institute Challenge was a youth soccer tournament organised by Football Federation Australia. The tournament was held between 2009 and 2014 at the Australian Institute of Sport headquarters in Canberra, Australia.

== Format ==
Within a group stage, the FFA Technical Committee awarded daily bonus points for the states that played most in line with the FFA’s National Curriculum criteria, with extra bonus points based on these criteria at the end of the stage. The group stage winner played a Final against the state with the most bonus points. The winner of the final then played against an All-Star team composed of the best players in that year's tournament.

== Participating states ==
- ACT Academy of Sport Football Program (ACT)
- Northern New South Wales Institute of Sport Football Program (NSW)
- FNSW NTC (NSW)
- Northern Territory National Training Centre (NT)
- Queensland Academy of Sport Football Program (QLD)
- South Australian National Training Centre (SA)
- Tasmanian National Training Centre (TAS)
- FFV NTC (VIC)
- FW NTC (WA)

== Tournament final winners ==
Titles	Team	Years
2	NSW	2009, 2012
2	South Australia	2010 (winter), 2010 (summer)
2	Victoria	2013, 2014
1	Queensland	2011
