= Colombia 2023 FIFA Women's World Cup bid =

Football World Cup host nation bid

Colombia bid
- for the 2023 FIFA Women's World Cup
- Colombia 2023 bid logo

Bid details
- Bidding nation: Colombia
- Bidding federation: Colombian Football Federation
- Proposed venues: 10 (in 10 cities)
- Bidding decision: 25 June 2020 in an online meeting of the FIFA Council

Bid result
- Unsuccessful - 13 votes of 35

The Colombia bid for the 2023 FIFA Women's World Cup was an unsuccessful bid to host the 2023 FIFA Women's World Cup by Colombian Football Federation. The single bid was announced on 12 December 2019. The bid entailed playing at 10 venues in 10 host cities, with the final held at the Estadio El Campín in Bogotá.

== Background ==
In 2016 the Colombian Football Federation indicated an interest to formalize the candidacy of Colombia as host country. Colombia previously hosted the 2011 FIFA U-20 World Cup and the 2016 FIFA Futsal World Cup. One of the requirements to host the World Cup is to have a national women's league, and in 2017 the Colombian Women's Football League played its first season. On 26 January 2019, Colombian President Iván Duque Márquez indicated that he had every intention of applying for Colombia to host the 2023 Women's World Cup.

== Proposed venues ==
The following host cities, venues and capacities were included in the Bid Book submitted to FIFA:

Armenia	Barranquilla	Bogotá	Bucaramanga	Cali
Centenario	Metropolitano Roberto Meléndez	Nemesio Camacho el Campín	Alfonso López	Pascual Guerrero Olympic
Capacity: 23,500	Capacity: 46,692	Capacity: 39,512	Capacity: 28,000	Capacity: 38,558
Colombia 2023 FIFA Women's World Cup bid is located in Colombia
Cartagena	Cúcuta	Manizales	Medellín	Pereira
Jaime Morón León Olympic	Santander General	Palogrande	Atanasio Girardot	Hernán Ramírez Villegas
Capacity: 20,000	Capacity: 32,163	Capacity: 31,611	Capacity: 44,863	Capacity: 30,297

== Controversy ==
=== Falsehoods in the candidacy ===
In the document sent for evaluation, some media pointed out a series of inaccuracies in it, for example, they cited that Colombia had organized the 2019 Pan American Games, being these played in Lima, besides indicating euphemisms such as "The Colombian women's tournament is among the most successful in the continent with 20,60 players, with an average attendance of 28,000 spectators in the finals of each championship". In Colombia, the Women's League has had three editions, being short tournaments with players earning minimum wages and needing additional jobs to survive, which raises doubts about its success.

== Result ==
Colombia was unsuccessful in its bid for the hosting rights to the 2023 FIFA Women's World Cup on 25 June 2020. In a vote of 35 eligible members of the FIFA Council, the bid received 13 votes to Australia and New Zealand's 22. Council members from CONMEBOL and UEFA voted for the bid. FIFA President Gianni Infantino voted for the Australia-New Zealand bid, alongside all council members from the Asian and Oceanian confederations, as well as those from CONCACAF and the Confederation of African Football.
