= Football Australia =

Soccer governing body of Australia

- Full name: Football Australia Limited
- Founded: 1961; 65 years ago; 2003 (incorporated)
- Headquarters: Sydney, New South Wales
- FIFA affiliation: 1963; 63 years ago
- AFC affiliation: 2006; 20 years ago
- AFF affiliation: 2013; 13 years ago
- Chairman: Anter Isaac
- Website: www.footballaustralia.com.au

Football Australia, formerly Football Federation Australia (2004–2020) and the Australian Soccer Association (2003–2004) operates national teams, second-tier and some other competitions of soccer in Australia. It succeeded the Australian Soccer Federation which was formed in 1961. It is headquartered in Sydney. In 2000, its former A-League, W-League and Y-League were spun off to the commercial Australian Professional Leagues.

Football Australia operates its men's, women's, youth, Paralympic, beach and its futsal national teams and its national coaching programs. Australian state and territory soccer federations are affiliated to it. It sanctions professional, semi-professional and amateur soccer in Australia. It is a member of the Asian Football Confederation (AFC) and ASEAN Football Federation (AFF).

== History ==
In 1911, the Commonwealth Football Association was formed which was superseded by the Australian Soccer Football Association in 1921, which was headquarters in Sydney. The Australian Soccer Football Association operated for forty years, obtained FIFA provisional membership in November 1954 and full membership in June 1956. In 1960, the association disbanded after being suspended from FIFA for poaching players from overseas. In 1961, the Australian Soccer Federation was formed but it was refused admittance to FIFA until outstanding fines of the former body were paid in 1963.

The Australian Soccer Federation repeatedly applied to join the Asian Football Confederation, from 1960, and in 1974 but was repeatedly denied. The Australian Soccer Federation and a New Zealand soccer body formed their own Oceania Football Federation (now Oceania Football Confederation) in 1966. The Australian Soccer Federation resigned as an OFC member in 1972 to pursue membership with the AFC but rejoined in 1978.

In 1995, the Australian Soccer Federation changed its name to Soccer Australia.

Soccer Australia had remained affiliated with the Football Association (FA) even after becoming a full member of FIFA. In 1997, Soccer Australia tried to nominate Australian head coach Terry Venables to replace former Victorian Soccer Federation chairman Sir David Hill-Wood as their representative on the FA Council, though this approach was rejected and Australian representation on the body was discontinued after his exit.

The Football Australia Hall of Fame was established in 1999, featuring 84 inaugural inductees.

In 2003, following the Soccer Australia team's failure to qualify for the 2002 FIFA World Cup, allegations of fraud and mismanagement were levelled at Soccer Australia by elements within the Australian press including the ABC. Soccer Australia commissioned an independent inquiry known as the Crawford Report as a result of the Australian government's threat to withdraw funding to the sport. Any political interference would have constituted a breach of FIFA statutes. The findings of the report were critically analysed by the board of Soccer Australia who believed that the recommendations contained therein were not capable of being implemented. The report recommended, among other things, the reconstitution of the organisation with an interim board headed by prominent businessman Frank Lowy. Some three months after Lowy's appointment, Soccer Australia was placed into liquidation and the Australian Soccer Association (ASA) was created and seized control of the premier soccer competitions and teams without encompassing the Crawford Report recommendations and effectively disenfranchised all other organisations and parties with an interest in Soccer Australia. The Australian government provided approximately $15 million to the ASA.

On 1 January 2005, ASA renamed itself Football Federation Australia (FFA), aligning with the international usage of the name "football" in preference to "soccer" and, by a more distinct name, distancing itself from the failings of the former Soccer Australia. It coined the phrase "old soccer, new football" to emphasise this.

On 1 January 2006, FFA quit the OFC and joined the AFC. The move was unanimously endorsed by the AFC on 23 March 2005 and assented by the OFC on 17 April 2005. FIFA approved the move on 29 June, noting that "as all of the parties involved ... had agreed to the move, the case did not need to be discussed by the FIFA Congress". The move was unanimously ratified by the AFC on 10 September. FFA hoped that the move would give its teams a fairer chance of qualifying for the FIFA World Cup and allow A-League clubs to compete in the AFC Champions League thereby improving the standard of soccer in Australia at international and club levels, with improved competition in the region.

In February 2008, FFA announced its intention to bid for the 2018 FIFA World Cup, 2022 FIFA World Cup and the 2015 AFC Asian Cup. In 2010, FFA decided to withdraw its World Cup bid for 2018, instead focusing on a bid for the 2022 tournament. FFA failed in its $45.6 million bid for the 2022 World Cup having received only one vote from the FIFA Executive.

In 2012, a rival soccer competition organisation Football Australia was formed and occupied that name.

On 27 August 2013, FFA was admitted as a full member to the ASEAN Football Federation (AFF), after it had become an invite affiliation to the regional body in 2006. However, its men's national team has not played in the ASEAN Championship as part of the initial agreement.

On 29 January 2015, after the defeat of the Iraq national football team and the United Arab Emirates national football team during the 2015 AFC Asian Cup, West Asian Football Federation members reportedly sought to remove Australia from the AFC, primarily due to "Australia benefiting hugely from Asian involvement without giving much in return".

In November 2018, with numerous FFA directors ending their 3-year term, the bulk were replaced at the annual general meeting. Steven Lowy resigned as chair of the directors in protest at major changes to the governance and voting structure in the Football Australia Congress which elects the directors. His position was filled by Chris Nikou.

On 25 June 2020, FFA won the rights to co-host the 2023 FIFA Women's World Cup alongside New Zealand.

On 25 November 2020, the FFA, in annual general meeting, voted to rename itself to Football Australia (FA) (following the end of the rival Football Australia competition, which had been formed in 2012). The name change was seen as a way to align branding with the state member federations.

On 31 December 2020, FA announced that the A-League, W-League and Y-League would no longer be operated by it in an 'unbundling' (de-merger or spinoff) process. The newly formed commercial Australian Professional Leagues would take over the running of the premier soccer competitions. As part of the unbundling, the Australian Professional Leagues also obtained the exclusive right to use the intellectual property rights associated with the A-League brand. These competitions are now known as the A-League Men, A-League Women and A-League Youth.

On 15 May 2024, FA won the rights to host the 2026 AFC Women's Asian Cup.

On 11 February 2025, a second tier Australian Championship was announced.

On 15 January 2026, FA announced former Stan CEO Martin Kugeler as its new CEO, taking over from interim CEO Heather Garriock who took the role in May 2025, following the departure of James Johnson.

== Administration ==
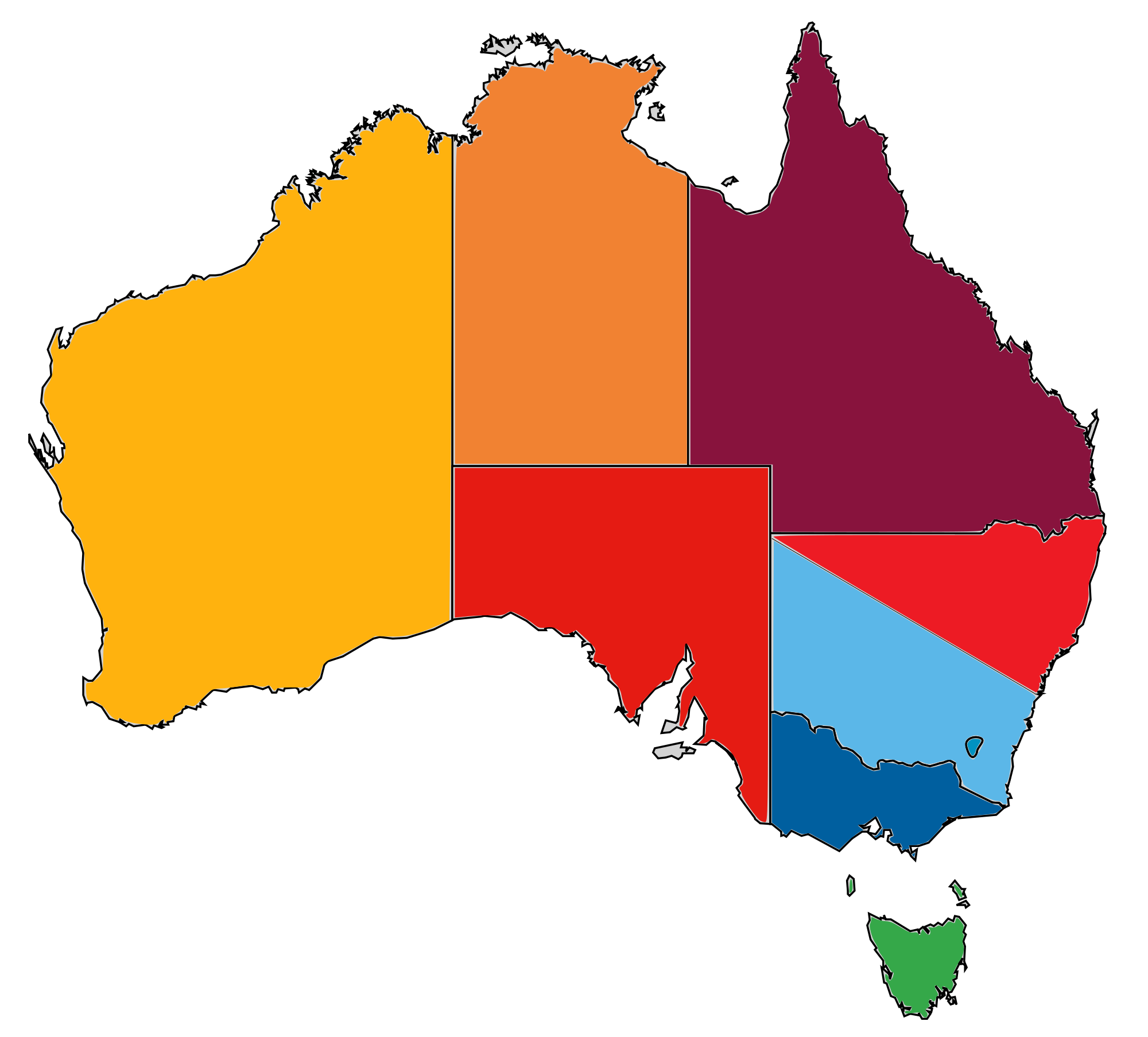
A diagram showing the nine member federations of Football Australia.

In Australia, local soccer clubs, competitions and associations were mostly established independently and later affiliated with regional and states and territory bodies. A federated model of national, states and territories bodies developed since the first state body was established in New South Wales in 1882. Today, there is FA, the professional leagues, nine state and territory member federations and over 100 district, regional and local zones and associations.

- Capital Football
- Northern NSW Football
- Football NSW
- Football Northern Territory
- Football Queensland
- Football South Australia
- Football Tasmania
- Football Victoria
- Football West

== Corporate structure ==
=== Board of Directors ===
Name	Position
Anter Isaac	Chair
Rachel Wiseman	Deputy Chair
Paul Bittar	Director
Joseph Carrozzi	Director
Angela Mentis	Director
Stuart Corbishley	Company Secretary

=== Executive Leadership Team ===
Name	Position
Martin Kugeler	Chief Executive Officer
Heather Garriock	Deputy Chief Executive Officer, Executive Director of Football
Tracy Beaumont	Interim Chief People Officer
Klaus Beiermann	Chief Corporate Affairs, Marketing and Content Officer
Peter Giurissevich	Acting General Counsel
Anne Gruber	Interim Chief Commercial Officer
George Houssos	Head of Corporate Affairs
Gary Moretti	Head of National Teams
Jon Moss	Head of Referees
Adam Santo	Chief Financial and Business Officer
Paul Suters	Chief Technology Officer

=== Senior Head Coaches ===
Name	Position
Tony Popovic	Men's national team head coach
Joe Montemurro	Women's national team head coach

== National Indigenous Advisory Group ==
In November 2021, Football Australia created the inaugural National Indigenous Advisory Group (NIAG), an advisory body aimed at helping to foster engagement with Aboriginal and Torres Strait Islander people and increase their participation in the game. NIAG is an advisory body for Football Australia, comprising 9 members of First Nations communities.

The inaugural members of the group are drawn from all levels of football as well as media, academia, and government: Frank Farina OAM, Karen Menzies (the first Indigenous Matilda), Tanya Oxtoby, Kyah Simon, Jade North (former Socceroos defender), Courtney Hagan, Kenny Bedford, Selina Holtze, Professor John Maynard, Narelda Jacobs, and Football Australia's Head of Women's Football, Sarah Walsh. North and Walsh are co-chairs of the group.

The initial focus of NIAG is on supporting and retaining First Nations players and other staff involved in the game, reviewing pathways and programs to football that impact social outcomes, fostering strategic partnerships, as well as developing employment strategies and the organisation's reconciliation action plan (RAP).

== Competitions ==
=== Current ===
- Australia Cup
- Australian Championship
- National Premier Leagues Men's
- National Premier Leagues Women's
- Emerging Socceroos Championships
- Emerging Matildas Championships

=== Former ===
- Australia Cup (1962–1968, defunct)
- Charity Shield (1981–1982, defunct)
- NSL Cup (1977–1996, defunct)
- National Soccer League (1977–2004, defunct)
- Women's National Soccer League (1996–2004, defunct)
- A-League Pre-season Challenge Cup (2005–2008, defunct)
- FFA State Institute Challenge (2009–2014, defunct)
- A-League Men (2005–2020)
- A-League Women (2008–2020)
- A-League Youth (2008–2020)

== See also ==
- Soccer in Australia
- Football Australia Hall of Fame
- Futsal in Australia
- Football Australia (defunct sporting federation)
