= AFC eAsian Cup =

- Organiser(s): AFC
- Founded: 2023; 3 years ago
- Region: Asia and Oceania (Australia)
- Teams: 19 (finals)
- Current champions: Indonesia (1st title)
- Most championships: Indonesia (1st title)
- Website: the-afc.com
- 2023 AFC eAsian Cup featuring eFootball

The AFC eAsian Cup is an esports competition contested by members of the Asian Football Confederation (AFC). The inaugural edition of the tournament was held on 1–5 February 2024, featuring teams that participated in the 2023 AFC Asian Cup. Indonesia are the inaugural champions.

== History ==
The AFC announced on 8 December 2023 that an esports tournament will be held from 1 to 5 February 2024, in conjunction with the 2023 edition of the Asian Cup. The participants of the said competition were initially 20 out of the 24 teams that qualified for the concurrent tournament. However, Hong Kong withdrew. It was held at the Virtuocity eSports Arena in Doha and played on Konami's football video game eFootball2024. Indonesia became the first champion after beating Japan by two games to none.

== Format ==
The tournament starts with the group stage in which each team plays each other twice. The top two teams per group, in addition to the four best third-placers, qualify for the knockout stage. From there, winners of each round will be determined in a best-of-three format including the final.

== Results ==
=== eFootball ===
Ed.	Year	Hosts	Final			Semi-finalists	Number of teams
Ed.	Year	Hosts	Champions	Result	Runners-up	Semi-finalists	Number of teams
1	2023	Qatar	Indonesia; Mohamad Akbar Paudie, Elga Cahya Putra, Rizky Faidan	(3) 0–0 (2); 1–0	Japan; Satake Shinichi, Aihara Tsubasa, Hashiki Shumpei	Thailand and Saudi Arabia	19

1st AFC eAsian Cup (2-5 February 2024)

20 out of 24 teams participated.

=== Group Stage ===
1. Qatar,Tajikistan,Lebanon
2. Uzbekistan,Syria,India
3. Iran,United Arab Emirates,Hong Kong
4. Japan,Indonesia,Vietnam
5. South Korea,Malaysia,Jordan,Bahrain
6. Saudi Arabia,Thailand,Kyrgyzstan,Oman

=== Round of 16 ===
1. United Arab Emirates W-L Lebanon
2. Indonesia W-L South Korea
3. Uzbekistan W-L Qatar
4. Thailand W-L Jordan
5. Iran W-L Syria
6. Japan W-L Bahrain
7. Vietnam W-L Tajikistan
8. Saudi Arabia W-L India

=== Round of 8 ===
1. Indonesia W-L United Arab Emirates
2. Thailand W-L Uzbekistan
3. Japan W-L Iran
4. Saudi Arabia W-L Vietnam

=== Semi Final ===
1. Indonesia W-L Thailand
2. Japan W-L Saudi Arabia

=== Final ===
1. Indonesia W-L Japan

=== Ranking ===
1. Indonesia
2. Japan
3. Thailand , Saudi Arabia (3rd Shared)
4. United Arab Emirates,Uzbekistan,Iran,Vietnam (5th Shared)

== Summary ==
Bold text denotes team was host country.

Team	Champions	Runners-up
Indonesia	1 (2023)	—N/a
Japan	—N/a	1 (2023)

== AFC eChampions League Elite ==
1st AFC eChampions League Elite in King Abdullah Sports City Sports Hall kicks off on April 24, 2025.

16 Team in 2 Group.

Games.

Teams (West)

1. Al Ain FC (UAE)
2. Al Gharafa SC (QAT)
3. Al Nassr Club (KSA)
4. Al Rayyan SC (QAT)
5. Al Sadd SC (QAT)
6. Al Wasl FC (UAE)
7. Pakhtakor (UZB)
8. Persepolis FC (IRN)

Teams (East)

1. Buriram United (THA)
2. FC Pohang Steelers (KOR)
3. Gwangju FC (KOR)
4. Johor Darul Ta’zim (MAS)
5. Shanghai Shenhua FC (CHN)
6. Ulsan HD FC (KOR)
7. Vissel Kobe (JPN)
8. Yokohama F. Marinos (JPN)
