= Asian Football Confederation =

International governing body for association football in Asia

AFC
- Asian Football Confederation

- Abbreviation: AFC
- Formation: 8 May 1954; 72 years ago
- Founded at: Manila, Philippines
- Type: Football organisation
- Headquarters: Kuala Lumpur, Malaysia
- Coordinates: 3.056737°N 101.673383°E
- Region served: Asia (Note: Also including some countries/territories in Oceania such as Australia, Guam, and the Northern Mariana Islands.)
- Members: 47 member associations
- Official languages: English; Arabic
- President: Salman bin Ibrahim Al Khalifa
- Vice-presidents: Zaw Zaw (AFF); Mehdi Taj (CAFA); Ganbaatar Amgalanbaatar (EAFF); Ugen Tsechup (SAFF); Hachem Haidar (WAFF)
- Secretary general: Windsor John
- Parent organisation: FIFA
- Subsidiaries: AFF (Southeast Asia); CAFA (Central Asia); EAFF (East Asia); SAFF (South Asia); WAFF (West Asia)
- Website: the-afc.com

The Asian Football Confederation (AFC) is the governing body of association football, beach soccer, and futsal in most countries and territories in Asia. It is one of the six continental confederations under FIFA and is responsible for organising international competitions for national teams and clubs within its jurisdiction, including the AFC Asian Cup and AFC Champions League Elite. Founded in 1954 and headquartered in Kuala Lumpur, Malaysia, the AFC comprises 47 member associations.

== History ==
The idea of an Asian Football Confederation was first brought up during the 1952 Summer Olympics in Helsinki, Finland. On 8 May 1954, the AFC was officially formed at the 1954 Asian Games in Manila, Philippines. The first president was Lo Man-kam of Hong Kong, and the first office was based in Hong Kong. The 13 founding members included Afghanistan, Burma, Hong Kong, India, Indonesia, Israel, Japan, Pakistan, the Philippines, Singapore, South Korea, South Vietnam, and Taiwan.

Of the AFC's original 13 member associations, only seven entered the qualifying tournament for the inaugural AFC Asian Cup in 1956. Four teams ultimately qualified for the final tournament, which was held in then-British Hong Kong. The 1956 tournament was the first edition of the AFC Asian Cup, the world's second-oldest continental national-team football competition.

Arab countries entered the Asian Cup qualifiers for the first time in the 1972 AFC Asian Cup qualification, following Israel's withdrawal. Israel was eventually expelled from the AFC in 1974, due to political pressure from Arab and Muslim members that refused to play against Israel.

In 1958, the office relocated from Hong Kong to Malaysia. In 2000, the AFC House was inaugurated as the AFC's headquarters; based in Bukit Jalil, Kuala Lumpur, the construction cost RM 18 million (US$ 8.18 million).

== Women's football ==
The Asian Ladies Football Confederation (ALFC) was the section of AFC that managed women's association football in Asia. The group was independently founded in April 1968 in a meeting involving Taiwan, British Hong Kong, Malaysia, and Singapore. In 1986, ALFC merged with AFC.

== Executive committee ==
On 1 February 2023, the AFC's member associations elected the AFC Executive Committee for the term 2023 to 2027. Including the AFC president, the AFC has seven members on the FIFA Council.

AFC President and FIFA Senior Vice President

- (Bahrain) Salman bin Ibrahim Al Khalifa

AFC Vice Presidents

- (Lebanon) Hachem Haidar
- (Iran) Mehdi Taj
- (Bhutan) Ugen Tsechup
- (Myanmar) Zaw Zaw
- (Mongolia) Ganbaatar Amgalanbaatar

AFC Female Executive Committee Members

- (Palestine) Susan Riyad Abdelrahim Al Shalabi
- (Bangladesh) Mahfuza Akhter Kiron
- (Laos) Kanya Keomany (Note: also a FIFA Council Member)
- (North Korea) Han Un-gyong

FIFA Council Members

- (Japan) Kohzo Tashima
- (Malaysia) Hamidin Mohd Amin
- (Laos) Kanya Keomany
- (Philippines) Mariano Araneta
- (Qatar) Hamad Bin Khalifa Bin Ahmed Al-Thani
- (Saudi Arabia) Yasser Al Misehal

AFC Executive Committee Members

- (Kuwait) Abdullah Ahmed Alshaheen Alrabeea
- (United Arab Emirates) Abdullah Nasser Aljneibi
- (Maldives) Bassam Adeel Jaleel
- (Nepal) Pankaj Bikram Nembang
- (Australia) Chris Nikou
- (Thailand) Somyot Poompanmoung
- (Uzbekistan) Ravshan Irmatov
- (Hong Kong) Eric Fok Kai Shan
- (India) Shaji Prabhakaran
- (Sri Lanka) Anura De Silva

== List of AFC presidents ==
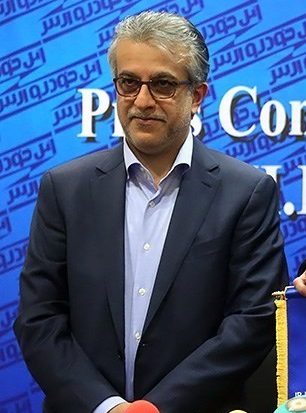
Salman bin Ibrahim Al Khalifa (2014) has been president of the AFC since 2013.

President	Nationality	Term
Lo Man-kam	Hong Kong	1954
Kwok Chan	Hong Kong	1954–1956
William Louey	Hong Kong	1956–1957
Chan Nam-cheong	Hong Kong	1957–1958
Tunku Abdul Rahman	Malaysia	1958–1976
Kambiz Atabay	Iran	1976–1978
Hamzah Abu Samah	Malaysia	1978–1994
Ahmad Shah	Malaysia	1994–2002
Mohammed bin Hammam	Qatar	2002–2011
Zhang Jilong	China	2011–2013 (acting)
Salman bin Ibrahim Al Khalifa	Bahrain	2013–present

== Members ==
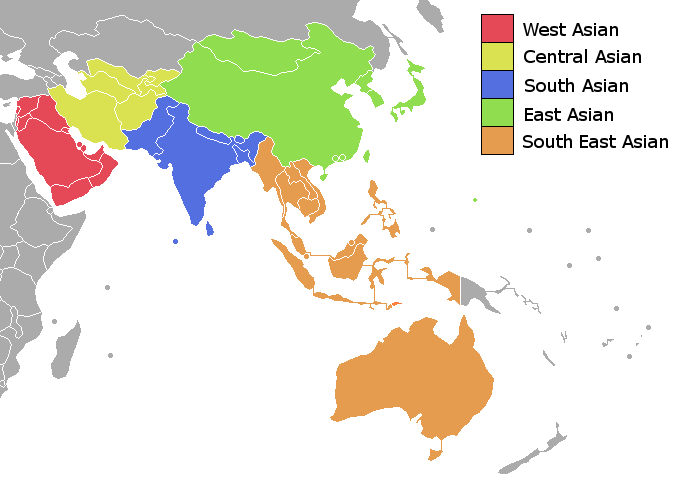
AFC regional federations

Due to the geographical size of Asia, the AFC is subdivided into five sub-confederations:

- ASEAN Football Federation (AFF) – represents countries in Southeast Asia, plus Australia.
- Central Asian Football Association (CAFA) – represents countries in Central Asia, comprising Afghanistan, Iran and most of Central Asia, except Kazakhstan.
- East Asian Football Federation (EAFF) – represents nations in East Asia, plus Guam and the Northern Mariana Islands.
- South Asian Football Federation (SAFF) – represents countries in South Asia.
- West Asian Football Federation (WAFF) – represents countries in West Asia, except Israel.

Code	Association	National teams	Founded	FIFA affiliation	AFC affiliation	Sub- confederation	IOC member
AFG	Afghanistan	Men's; U23; U20; U17; F; BS; Women's; U20; U17	1933	1948	1954	CAFA	Yes
AUS	Australia (Note: Former member of the Oceania Football Confederation (1966–1972, 1978–2006), joined AFC.)	Men's; U23; U20; U17; F; BS; Women's; U20; U17	1961	1963	2006	AFF	Yes (Note: Oceania country or territory is a member of the Oceania National Olympic Committees rather than the Olympic Council of Asia.)
BHR	Bahrain	Men's; U23; U20; U17; F; BS; Women's; U20; U17	1957	1968	1969	WAFF	Yes
BAN	Bangladesh	Men's; U23; U20; U17; F; BS; Women's; U20; U17	1972	1976	1974	SAFF	Yes
BHU	Bhutan	Men's; U23; U20; U17; F; BS; Women's; U20; U17	1983	2000	1993	SAFF	Yes
BRU	Brunei	Men's; U23; U20; U17; F; BS; Women's; U20; U17	1952	1972	1969	AFF	Yes
CAM	Cambodia	Men's; U23; U20; U17; F; BS; Women's; U20; U17	1933	1954	1954	AFF	Yes
CHN	China	Men's; U23; U20; U17; F; BS; Women's; U20; U17	1924	1931	1974	EAFF	Yes
TPE	Chinese Taipei	Men's; U23; U20; U17; F; BS; Women's; U20; U17	1936	1954	1954	EAFF	Yes
GUM	Guam	Men's; U23; U20; U17; F; BS; Women's; U20; U17	1975	1996	1991	EAFF	Yes
HKG	Hong Kong	Men's; U23; U20; U17; F; BS; Women's; U20; U17	1914	1954	1954	EAFF	Yes
IND	India	Men's; U23; U20; U17; F; BS; Women's; U20; U17	1937	1948	1954	SAFF	Yes
IDN	Indonesia	Men's; U23; U20; U17; F; BS; Women's; U20; U17	1930	1952	1954	AFF	Yes
IRN	Iran	Men's; U23; U20; U17; F; BS; Women's; U20; U17	1920	1948	1958	CAFA	Yes
IRQ	Iraq	Men's; U23; U20; U17; F; BS; Women's; U20; U17	1948	1950	1970	WAFF	Yes
JPN	Japan	Men's; U23; U20; U17; F; BS; Women's; U20; U17	1921	1929	1954	EAFF	Yes
JOR	Jordan	Men's; U23; U20; U17; F; BS; Women's; U20; U17	1949	1956	1970	WAFF	Yes
KUW	Kuwait	Men's; U23; U20; U17; F; BS; Women's; U20; U17	1952	1964	1964	WAFF	Yes
KGZ	Kyrgyzstan	Men's; U23; U20; U17; F; BS; Women's; U20; U17	1992	1994	1993	CAFA	Yes
LAO	Laos	Men's; U23; U20; U17; F; BS; Women's; U20; U17	1951	1952	1968	AFF	Yes
LBN	Lebanon	Men's; U23; U20; U17; F; BS; Women's; U20; U17	1933	1936	1964	WAFF	Yes
MAC	Macau	Men's; U23; U20; U17; F; BS; Women's; U20; U17	1939	1978	1978	EAFF	No (Note: Macau's Olympic Committee is an OCA member but not an IOC member.)
MAS	Malaysia	Men's; U23; U20; U17; F; BS; Women's; U20; U17	1933	1954	1954	AFF	Yes
MDV	Maldives	Men's; U23; U20; U17; F; BS; Women's; U20; U17	1982	1986	1984	SAFF	Yes
MNG	Mongolia	Men's; U23; U20; U17; F; BS; Women's; U20; U17	1959	1998	1993	EAFF	Yes
MYA	Myanmar	Men's; U23; U20; U17; F; BS; Women's; U20; U17	1947	1948	1954	AFF	Yes
NEP	Nepal	Men's; U23; U20; U17; F; BS; Women's; U20; U17	1951	1972	1954	SAFF	Yes
PRK	North Korea	Men's; U23; U20; U17; F; BS; Women's; U20; U17	1945	1958	1974	EAFF	Yes
NMI	Northern Mariana Islands	Men's; U23; U20; U17; F; BS; Women's; U20; U17	2005	N/A	2020	EAFF	No (Note: Part of the United States Olympic Committee.)
OMA	Oman	Men's; U23; U20; U17; F; BS; Women's; U20; U17	1978	1980	1980	WAFF	Yes
PAK	Pakistan	Men's; U23; U20; U17; F; BS; Women's; U20; U17	1947	1948	1954	SAFF	Yes
PLE	Palestine	Men's; U23; U20; U17; F; BS; Women's; U20; U17	1998	1998	1998	WAFF	Yes
PHI	Philippines	Men's; U23; U20; U17; F; BS; Women's; U20; U17	1907	1930	1954	AFF	Yes
QAT	Qatar	Men's; U23; U20; U17; F; BS; Women's; U20; U17	1960	1972	1974	WAFF	Yes
KSA	Saudi Arabia	Men's; U23; U20; U17; F; BS; Women's; U20; U17	1956	1956	1972	WAFF	Yes
SGP	Singapore	Men's; U23; U20; U17; F; BS; Women's; U20; U17	1892	1952	1954	AFF	Yes
KOR	South Korea	Men's; U23; U20; U17; F; BS; Women's; U20; U17	1928	1948	1954	EAFF	Yes
SRI	Sri Lanka	Men's; U23; U20; U17; F; BS; Women's; U20; U17	1939	1952	1954	SAFF	Yes
SYR	Syria	Men's; U23; U20; U17; F; BS; Women's; U20; U17	1936	1937	1970	WAFF	Yes
TJK	Tajikistan	Men's; U23; U20; U17; F; BS; Women's; U20; U17	1936	1994	1993	CAFA	Yes
THA	Thailand	Men's; U23; U20; U17; F; BS; Women's; U20; U17	1916	1925	1954	AFF	Yes
TLS	Timor-Leste	Men's; U23; U20; U17; F; BS; Women's; U20; U17	2002	2005	2002	AFF	Yes
TKM	Turkmenistan	Men's; U23; U20; U17; F; BS; Women's; U20; U17	1992	1994	1993	CAFA	Yes
UAE	United Arab Emirates	Men's; U23; U20; U17; F; BS; Women's; U20; U17	1971	1974	1974	WAFF	Yes
UZB	Uzbekistan	Men's; U23; U20; U17; F; BS; Women's; U20; U17	1946	1994	1993	CAFA	Yes
VIE	Vietnam	Men's; U23; U20; U17; F; BS; Women's; U20; U17	1960	1952	1954	AFF	Yes
YEM	Yemen	Men's; U23; U20; U17; F; BS; Women's; U20; U17	1962	1980	1980	WAFF	Yes

=== Former members ===
Code	Association	Year	Note
NZL	New Zealand	1964	Founding member of the OFC in 1966.
ISR	Israel	1954–1974	Joined UEFA after international matches against national teams representing Arab countries boycotted by the West Asian Football Federation. Later became a full UEFA member in 1994.
VSO	South Vietnam	1954–1975	Unified with North Vietnam as Vietnam.
YMD	South Yemen	1972–1990	Unified with North Yemen as Yemen.
KAZ	Kazakhstan	1993–2002	Joined UEFA in 2002.

== Competitions ==
=== AFC competitions ===
The AFC organises the AFC Asian Cup and the AFC Women's Asian Cup, both held every four years. It also runs the AFC Futsal Asian Cup, AFC Women's Futsal Asian Cup, and the AFC Beach Soccer Asian Cup, along with various youth and age-group international football and futsal tournaments. In addition, the AFC oversees the Asian qualifying tournaments for the FIFA World Cup and for football at the Summer Olympics.

The premier men's club competition is the AFC Champions League Elite, which is an amalgamation of the Asian Club Championship, the Asian Cup Winners' Cup, and the Asian Super Cup. It features leading clubs from AFC member associations, with the number of participating teams determined by the ranking of each association, allowing for promotion or relegation of slots based on performance. The top-tier women's club competition is the AFC Women's Champions League, introduced in the 2024–25 season.

The second-tier men's club competition is the AFC Champions League Two, while the third tier is the AFC Challenge League, both of which were restructured and rebranded in 2024.

The AFC also organises the annual AFC Futsal Club Championship, the continent’s premier club futsal competition.

National teams:

Men

- AFC Asian Cup
- AFC Nations League
- AFC U-23 Asian Cup
- AFC U-20 Asian Cup
- AFC U-17 Asian Cup
- AFC Futsal Asian Cup
- AFC U-20 Futsal Asian Cup
- AFC Beach Soccer Asian Cup

Women

- AFC Women's Asian Cup
- AFC U-20 Women's Asian Cup
- AFC U-17 Women's Asian Cup
- AFC Women's Olympic Qualifying Tournament
- AFC Women's Futsal Asian Cup

Esports

- AFC eAsian Cup

Clubs:

Men

- AFC Champions League Elite
- AFC Champions League Two
- AFC Challenge League
- AFC Futsal Club Championship

Women

- AFC Women's Champions League

Esports

- AFC eChampions League Elite

Defunct

See also: Category:Defunct association football competitions

National teams:

Men

- AFC Solidarity Cup
- AFC Challenge Cup
- Afro-Asian Cup of Nations
- AFC–OFC Challenge Cup
- AFC U-14 Championship

Women

- AFC U-14 Girls' Regional Championship

Clubs:

Men

- Asian Cup Winners' Cup
- Asian Super Cup
- Afro-Asian Club Championship
- AFC Futsal Club Championship

Women

- AFC Women's Club Championship

=== Current title holders ===
Competition	Year	Champions	Title	Runners-up	Next edition
Men's national teams
Asian Cup (qualification)	2023 (qual.)	Qatar	2nd	Jordan	2027 (qual.)
Nations League	—	—	—	—	2030–31
U-23 Asian Cup	2026 (qual.)	Japan	3rd	China	2028 (qual.)
U-20 Asian Cup	2025 (qual.)	Australia	1st	Saudi Arabia	2027 (qual.)
U-17 Asian Cup	2026 (qual.)	Japan	5th	China	2027 (qual.)
Futsal Asian Cup	2026 (qual.)	Iran	14th	Indonesia	2028 (qual.)
U-20 Futsal Asian Cup	2019 (qual.)	Japan	1st	Afghanistan	2029 (qual.)
Beach Soccer Asian Cup	2025	Iran	4th	Oman	2026
Women's national teams
Women's Asian Cup (qualification)	2026 (qual.)	Japan	3rd	Australia	2029 (qual.)
U-20 Women's Asian Cup	2026 (qual.)	Japan	7th	North Korea	2028 (qual.)
U-17 Women's Asian Cup	2026 (qual.)	North Korea	5th	Japan	2027 (qual.)
Women's Olympic Qualifying Tournament	2024	Australia; Japan	N/A	Uzbekistan; North Korea	2028
Women's Futsal Asian Cup	2025	Japan	1st	Thailand	2027
Men's club teams
Champions League Elite	2025–26	(Saudi Arabia) Al-Ahli	2nd	(Japan) Machida Zelvia	2026–27
Champions League Two	2025–26	(Japan) Gamba Osaka	1st	(Saudi Arabia) Al-Nassr	2026–27
Challenge League	2025–26	Kuwait	1st	(Cambodia) Svay Rieng	2026–27
Futsal Club Championship	2019	(Japan) Nagoya Oceans	4th	(Iran) Mes Sungun	2027
Women's club teams
Women's Champions League	2025–26	(North Korea) Naegohyang	1st	(Japan) Tokyo Verdy Beleza	2026–27 (qual.)

=== Esports ===
Competition	Current	Game	Winner	Details	Runner-up	Next
AFC eAsian Cup	2023	eFootball 2024	Indonesia	Final	Japan	TBD
AFC eChampions League Elite	2025	eFootball 2025	Al Nassr	Final	Persepolis	2026

=== Defunct tournaments ===
Competition	Last held	Champions	Title	Runners-up
Men's national teams
Afro-Asian Cup of Nations	2007	Japan	2nd	Egypt
AFC–OFC Challenge Cup	2003	Iran	1st	New Zealand
AFC Solidarity Cup	2016	Nepal	1st	Macau
AFC Challenge Cup	2014	Palestine	1st	Philippines
AFC U-14 Championship	2014	Iraq	1st	North Korea
Men's club teams
Afro-Asian Club Championship	1998	(Morocco) Raja Casablanca	1st	(South Korea) Pohang Steelers
Asian Cup Winners' Cup	2001–02	(Saudi Arabia) Al Hilal	2nd	(South Korea) Jeonbuk Hyundai Motors
Asian Super Cup	2002	(South Korea) Suwon Samsung Bluewings	2nd	(Saudi Arabia) Al Hilal
Women's club teams
AFC Women's Club Championship	2023	(Japan) Urawa Red Diamonds	1st	(South Korea) Incheon Hyundai Steel Red Angels

=== Titles by nation ===
Nation	Men				Women			Futsal			Beach soccer	Total
Nation	Asia	U23	U20	U17	Asia	U20	U17	Men's	U20	Women's	Men's	Total
Japan	4	3	1	5	3	7	4	4	1	1	3	36
Iran	3	–	4	1	–	–	–	14	1	2	4	29
South Korea	2	1	12	2	–	2	1	–	–	–	–	20
North Korea	–	–	3	2	3	2	5	–	–	–	–	15
China	–	–	1	2	9	1	–	–	–	–	–	13
Saudi Arabia	3	1	3	2	–	–	–	–	–	–	–	9
Iraq	1	1	5	1	–	–	–	–	–	–	–	8
Israel	1	–	6	–	–	–	–	–	–	–	–	7
Myanmar	–	–	7	–	–	–	–	–	–	–	–	7
Qatar	2	–	1	1	–	–	–	–	–	–	–	4
Thailand	–	–	2	1	1	–	–	–	–	–	–	4
Uzbekistan	–	1	1	2	–	–	–	–	–	–	–	4
Australia	1	–	1	–	1	–	–	–	–	–	–	3
Chinese Taipei	–	–	–	–	3	–	–	–	–	–	–	3
Oman	–	–	–	2	–	–	–	–	–	–	1	3
United Arab Emirates	–	–	1	–	–	–	–	–	–	–	2	3
Bahrain	–	–	–	–	–	–	–	–	–	–	1	1
India	–	–	1	–	–	–	–	–	–	–	–	1
Indonesia	–	–	1	–	–	–	–	–	–	–	–	1
Kuwait	1	–	–	–	–	–	–	–	–	–	–	1
New Zealand	–	–	–	–	1	–	–	–	–	–	–	1
Syria	–	–	1	–	–	–	–	–	–	–	–	1

== FIFA World Rankings ==
=== Overview ===
FIFA Men's Rankings (as of 7 October 2026)
AFC*	FIFA	+/-	National Team	Points
1	17	Steady	Japan	1684.75
2	23	▼1	Iran	1597.31
3	26	▲2	Australia	1585.52
4	32	Steady	South Korea	1562.49
5	55	▲3	Saudi Arabia	1443.17
6	59	▲1	Uzbekistan	1416.61
7	60	▼1	Qatar	1416.47
8	63	Steady	Iraq	1400.91
9	65	▲3	United Arab Emirates	1376.95
10	72	▲1	Jordan	1350.88
11	81	▼2	Oman	1302.77
12	86	▼3	Syria	1279.94
13	92	▲3	Palestine	1253.75
14	93	▲1	Thailand	1251.42
15	96	▼5	China	1241.9
16	97	▼5	Bahrain	1240.3
17	99	Steady	Vietnam	1231.29
18	100	▲1	Tajikistan	1218.88
19	104	▲2	Kyrgyzstan	1199.73
20	112	▲3	Lebanon	1170.3
21	116	▲2	Indonesia	1166.5
22	121	▼1	North Korea	1151.05
23	133	▲3	Malaysia	1102.09
24	134	▼1	Kuwait	1098.64
25	136	▼1	Philippines	1095.85
26	138	Steady	India	1086.43
27	139	▲2	Turkmenistan	1078.65
28	144	▲1	Yemen	1067.53
29	149	▼1	Singapore	1058.95
30	153	▲3	Hong Kong	1035.23
31	159	▼1	Myanmar	1008.08
32	168	▲3	Afghanistan	968.07
33	173	Steady	Maldives	935.93
34	176	▼2	Chinese Taipei	923.78
35	177	▼2	Cambodia	920.83
36	178	▼1	Nepal	914.54
37	182	▼1	Bangladesh	893.46
38	184	▲3	Sri Lanka	890.64
39	188	▼3	Laos	880.17
40	190	Steady	Mongolia	874.47
41	192	Steady	Bhutan	870.81
42	193	Steady	Macau	858.03
43	196	▼2	Brunei	849.56
44	197	▲1	Pakistan	839.03
45	202	▼1	Timor-Leste	823.16
46	203	Steady	Guam	819.54
*Local rankings based on FIFA ranking points

FIFA Women's Rankings (as of 16 June 2026)
AFC*	FIFA	+/-	National Team	Points
1	5	Steady	Japan	1998.83
2	11	Steady	North Korea	1910.63
3	15	Steady	Australia	1830.66
4	16	Steady	China	1799.13
5	19	Steady	South Korea	1780.68
6	37	Steady	Vietnam	1593.71
7	39	Steady	Philippines	1566.44
8	40	Steady	Chinese Taipei	1565.81
9	49	▲1	Thailand	1485.04
10	51	▲2	Uzbekistan	1474.15
11	55	Steady	Myanmar	1460.7
12	68	Steady	Iran	1370.37
13	69	Steady	India	1368.7
14	76	Steady	Jordan	1299.21
15	81	▲1	Hong Kong	1280.53
16	88	▼1	Nepal	1238.74
17	95	▼3	Malaysia	1208.12
18	98	Steady	Guam	1201.73
19	107	▲5	Bangladesh	1171.05
20	110	▼4	Indonesia	1162.58
21	113	▲4	Cambodia	1153.44
22	116	▼8	Bahrain	1146.97
23	117	▼4	Laos	1143
24	124	▼1	United Arab Emirates	1126.67
25	129	Steady	Palestine	1111.4
26	130	Steady	Lebanon	1100.95
27	137	▲6	Kyrgyzstan	1070.63
28	141	▼1	Turkmenistan	1063.88
29	146	Steady	Mongolia	1035.67
30	151	▲1	Singapore	1025.38
31	154	Steady	Pakistan	1008.65
32	157	▲3	Saudi Arabia	971.11
33	158	▼1	Timor-Leste	965.35
34	159	▼1	Tajikistan	954.78
35	161	▲3	Bhutan	933.09
36	162	▼1	Syria	931.42
37	165	▼3	Sri Lanka	915.58
38	166	Steady	Iraq	910.49
39	167	Steady	Maldives	906.97
40	176	Steady	Macau	846.53
*Local rankings based on FIFA ranking points

==== Team of the Year ====
Teams ranking in the top four – Men's
Year	First	Second	Third	Fourth
2025	Japan	Iran	South Korea	Australia
2024	Japan	Iran	South Korea	Australia
2023	Japan	Iran	South Korea	Australia
2022	Japan	Iran	South Korea	Australia
2021	Iran	Japan	South Korea	Australia
2020	Japan	Iran	South Korea	Australia
2019	Japan	Iran	South Korea	Australia
2018	Iran	Australia	Japan	South Korea
2017	Iran	Australia	Japan	South Korea
2016	Iran	South Korea	Japan	Australia
2015	Iran	South Korea	Japan	Australia
2014	Iran	Japan	South Korea	Uzbekistan
2013	Iran	Japan	South Korea	Australia
2012	Japan	South Korea	Australia	Iran
2011	Japan	Australia	South Korea	Iran
2010	Australia	Japan	South Korea	Iran
2009	Australia	Japan	South Korea	Bahrain
2008	Australia	Japan	South Korea	Iran
2007	Japan	Iran	South Korea	Australia
2006	Iran	Australia	Uzbekistan	Japan
2005	Japan	Iran	South Korea	Saudi Arabia
2004	Japan	Iran	South Korea	Saudi Arabia
2003	South Korea	Saudi Arabia	Iran	Japan
2002	South Korea	Japan	Iran	Saudi Arabia
2001	Iran	Saudi Arabia	Japan	South Korea
2000	Saudi Arabia	Iran	Japan	South Korea
1999	Saudi Arabia	Iran	South Korea	United Arab Emirates
1998	South Korea	Japan	Kuwait	Iran
1997	Japan	South Korea	Saudi Arabia	Kuwait
1996	Japan	Saudi Arabia	South Korea	Thailand
1995	Japan	South Korea	Saudi Arabia	China
1994	Saudi Arabia	South Korea	Japan	China
1993	Saudi Arabia	South Korea	Japan	United Arab Emirates

Teams ranking in the top four – Women's
Year	First	Second	Third	Fourth
2025	Japan	North Korea	Australia	China
2024	Japan	North Korea	Australia	China
2023	Japan	North Korea	Australia	China
2022	North Korea	Japan	Australia	China
2021	North Korea	Australia	Japan	South Korea
2020	Australia	Japan	China	South Korea
2019	Australia	Japan	North Korea	China
2018	Australia	Japan	North Korea	South Korea
2017	Australia	Japan	North Korea	South Korea
2016	Australia	Japan	North Korea	China
2015	Japan	North Korea	Australia	China
2014	Japan	North Korea	Australia	China
2013	Japan	Australia	North Korea	South Korea
2012	Japan	Australia	North Korea	South Korea
2011	Japan	North Korea	Australia	South Korea
2010	Japan	North Korea	Australia	China
2009	North Korea	Japan	China	Australia
2008	North Korea	Japan	China	Australia
2007	North Korea	Japan	Australia	China
2006	North Korea	China	Japan	South Korea
2005	North Korea	China	Japan	South Korea
2004	China	North Korea	Japan	Chinese Taipei
2003	China	North Korea	Japan	Chinese Taipei

== Major tournament records ==
Legend

- 1st – Champions
- 2nd – Runners-up
- 3rd – Third place
- 4th – Fourth place
- SF – Semi-finals
- QF – Quarter-finals (1934–1938, 1954–1970, and 1986–present)
- R3 — Round 3 (2026–present: knockout round of 16)
- R2 — Round 2 (1974–1978: second group stage, top 8; 1982: second group stage, top 12; 1986–2022: knockout round of 16; 2026–present: knockout round of 32)
- R1 — Round 1 (1930, 1950–1970 and 1986–present: group stage; 1934–1938: knockout round of 16; 1974–1982: first group stage)
- Q — Qualified for upcoming tournament
- •• — Qualified but withdrew
- • — Did not qualify
- × — Did not enter / withdrawn / banned / disqualified
- — Hosts

For each tournament, the flag of the host country and the number of teams in each finals tournament (in brackets) are shown.

=== FIFA World Cup ===
FIFA World Cup record
Team	1930 (Uruguay) (13)	1934 (Italy) (16)	1938 (France) (15)	1950 (Brazil) (13)	1954 (Switzerland) (16)	1958 (Sweden) (16)	1962 (Chile) (16)	1966 (England) (16)	1970 (Mexico) (16)	1974 (West Germany) (16)	1978 (Argentina) (16)	1982 (Spain) (24)	1986 (Mexico) (24)	1990 (Italy) (24)	1994 (United States) (24)	1998 (France) (32)	2002 (Japan) (South Korea) (32)	2006 (Germany) (32)	2010 (South Africa) (32)	2014 (Brazil) (32)	2018 (Russia) (32)	2022 (Qatar) (32)	2026 (Canada) (Mexico) (United States) (48)	2030 (Morocco) (Portugal) (Spain) (48)	2034 (Saudi Arabia) (48)	Years
Australia (Note: Australia has qualified for the FIFA WC for seven times, twice through OFC qualifying and five times through the AFC.)	Not an AFC member																		R1	R1	R1	R2	R2			5
China	×	×	×	×	×	•	×	×	×	×	×	•	•	•	•	•	R1	•	•	•	•	•	•			1
Indonesia	× (Note: As the Dutch East Indies)	×	R1	×	×	•	×	×	×	•	•	•	•	•	•	•	•	•	•	•	×	•	•			1
Iran	×	×	×	×	×	×	×	×	×	•	R1	×	×	•	•	R1	•	R1	•	R1	R1	R1	R1			7
Iraq	Did not exist			×	×	×	×	×	×	•	×	•	R1	•	•	•	•	•	•	•	•	•	R1			2
Israel	× (Note: As Mandatory Palestine)	•	•	•	•	•	•	•	R1	•	Not an AFC member															1
Japan	×	×	×	×	•	×	•	×	•	•	•	•	•	•	•	R1	R2	R1	R2	R1	R2	R2	R2			8
Jordan	Did not exist					×	×	×	×	×	×	×	•	•	•	•	•	•	•	•	•	•	R1			1
Kuwait	Did not exist			×	×	×	×	×	×	•	•	R1	•	•	•	•	•	•	•	•	×	•	•			1
North Korea	Did not exist			×	×	×	×	QF	×	•	×	•	•	•	•	×	×	•	R1	•	•	×	•			2
Qatar	Did not exist										×	×	•	•	•	•	•	•	•	•	•	R1	R1			2
Saudi Arabia	Did not exist					×	×	×	×	×	•	•	•	•	R2	R1	R1	R1	•	•	R1	R1	R1		Q	7
South Korea	Did not exist			×	R1	×	•	×	•	•	•	•	R1	R1	R1	R1	4th	R1	R2	R1	R1	R2	R1			12
United Arab Emirates	Did not exist										×	×	•	R1	•	•	•	•	•	•	•	•	•			1
Uzbekistan	Did not exist															•	•	•	•	•	•	•	R1			1
Total (15 teams)	0	0	1	0	1	0	0	1	1	0	1	1	2	2	2	4	4	4	4	4	5	6	9			52

=== AFC Asian Cup ===
AFC Asian Cup record
Team (Total 36 teams)	1956 (Hong Kong) (4)	1960 (South Korea) (4)	1964 (Israel) (4)	1968 (Iran) (5)	1972 (Thailand) (6)	1976 (Iran) (6)	1980 (Kuwait) (10)	1984 (Singapore) (10)	1988 (Qatar) (10)	1992 (Japan) (8)	1996 (United Arab Emirates) (12)	2000 (Lebanon) (12)	2004 (China) (16)	2007 (Indonesia) (Malaysia) (Thailand) (Vietnam) (16)	2011 (Qatar) (16)	2015 (Australia) (16)	2019 (United Arab Emirates) (24)	2023 (Qatar) (24)	2027 (Saudi Arabia) (24)	Years
Australia	Not an AFC member													QF	2nd	1st	QF	QF	Q	6
Bahrain									GS				4th	GS	GS	GS	R16	R16	Q	8
Bangladesh							GS													1
Cambodia					4th															1
China						3rd	GS	2nd	4th	3rd	QF	4th	2nd	GS	GS	QF	QF	GS	Q	14
Chinese Taipei		3rd		4th																2
Hong Kong	3rd		4th	5th														GS		4
India			2nd					GS							GS		GS	GS		5
Indonesia											GS	GS	GS	GS				R16	Q	6
Iran				1st	1st	1st	3rd	4th	3rd	GS	3rd	QF	3rd	QF	QF	QF	SF	SF	Q	16
Iraq					GS	4th					QF	QF	QF	1st	QF	4th	R16	R16	Q	11
Israel	2nd	2nd	1st	3rd	Part of UEFA															4
Japan									GS	1st	QF	1st	1st	4th	1st	QF	2nd	QF	Q	11
Jordan													QF		QF	GS	R16	2nd	Q	6
Kuwait					GS	2nd	1st	3rd	GS		4th	QF	GS		GS	GS			Q	11
Kyrgyzstan																	R16	GS	Q	3
Lebanon												GS					GS	GS		3
Malaysia						GS	GS							GS				GS		4
Myanmar				2nd																1
North Korea							4th			GS					GS	GS	GS		Q	6
Oman													GS	GS		GS	R16	GS	Q	6
Palestine																GS	GS	R16	Q	4
Philippines																	GS			1
Qatar							GS	GS	GS	GS		QF	GS	GS	QF	GS	1st	1st	Q	12
Saudi Arabia								1st	1st	2nd	1st	2nd	GS	2nd	GS	GS	R16	R16	Q	12
Singapore								GS											Q	2
South Korea	1st	1st	3rd		2nd		2nd	GS	2nd		QF	3rd	QF	3rd	3rd	2nd	QF	SF	Q	16
South Yemen						GS				Part of Yemen										1
Syria							GS	GS	GS		GS				GS		GS	R16	Q	8
Tajikistan																		QF	Q	1
Thailand					3rd					GS	GS	GS	GS	GS			R16	R16	Q	8
Turkmenistan													GS				GS			2
United Arab Emirates							GS	GS	GS	4th	2nd		GS	GS	GS	3rd	SF	R16	Q	12
Uzbekistan											GS	GS	QF	QF	4th	QF	R16	QF	Q	9
Vietnam	4th	4th												QF			QF	GS	Q	5
Yemen																	GS		Q	2

=== FIFA Women's World Cup ===
FIFA Women's World Cup record
Team	1991 (China) (12)	1995 (Sweden) (12)	1999 (United States) (16)	2003 (United States) (16)	2007 (China) (16)	2011 (Germany) (16)	2015 (Canada) (24)	2019 (France) (24)	2023 (Australia) (New Zealand) (32)	2027 (Brazil) (32)	Years
Australia	Part of OFC				QF	QF	QF	R2	4th	Q	6
China	QF	4th	2nd	QF	QF	•	QF	R2	R1	Q	9
Chinese Taipei	QF	•	•	•	•	•	•	•	•	•	1
Japan	R1	QF	R1	R1	R1	1st	2nd	R2	QF	Q	10
North Korea	•	×	R1	R1	QF	R1	×	•	×	Q	5
Philippines	•	•	•	•	•	•	•	•	R1	Q	2
South Korea	•	•	•	R1	•	•	R2	R1	R1	Q	5
Thailand	•	•	•	•	•	•	R1	R1	•	•	2
Vietnam	×	×	×	•	•	•	•	•	R1	•	1
Total (9 teams)	3	2	3	4	4	3	5	5	5+1	6	41

=== Olympic Games ===
==== Men's tournament ====
Olympic Games (Men's tournament) record
Team	1900 (France) (3)	1904 (United States) (3)		1908 (United Kingdom) (6)	1912 (Sweden) (11)	1920 (Belgium) (14)	1924 (France) (22)	1928 (Netherlands) (17)	1936 (Germany) (16)	1948 (United Kingdom) (18)	1952 (Finland) (25)	1956 (Australia) (11)	1960 (Italy) (16)	1964 (Japan) (14)	1968 (Mexico) (16)	1972 (West Germany) (16)	1976 (Canada) (13)	1980 (Soviet Union) (16)	1984 (United States) (16)	1988 (South Korea) (16)	1992 (Spain) (16)	1996 (United States) (16)	2000 (Australia) (16)	2004 (Greece) (16)	2008 (China) (16)	2012 (United Kingdom) (16)	2016 (Brazil) (16)	2020 (Japan) (16)	2024 (France) (16)	2028 (United States) (12)	Years
Afghanistan	•	•	•	•	•	•	•	•		GS																					1
Australia	Not an AFC member																								GS			GS			2
China	•	•	•	•	•	•	•	•	GS											GS					GS						3
Chinese Taipei	•	•	•	•	•	•	•	•		GS			GS																		2
India	•	•	•	•	•	•	•	•		GS	GS	4th	GS																		4
Indonesia	•	•	•	•	•	•	•	•				QF																			1
Iran	•	•	•	•	•	•	•	•						GS		GS	QF														3
Iraq	•	•	•	•	•	•	•	•	Not a member of AFC									QF	GS	GS				4th			GS		GS		6
Israel	•	•	•	•	•	•	•	•							QF		QF	Not a member of AFC													2
Japan	•	•	•	•	•	•	•	•	QF			GS		QF	3rd							GS	QF	GS	GS	4th	GS	4th	QF		12
Kuwait	•	•	•	•	•	•	•	•										QF			GS		GS								3
Malaysia	•	•	•	•	•	•	•	•								GS															1
Myanmar	•	•	•	•	•	•	•	•								GS															1
North Korea	•	•	•	•	•	•	•	•									QF														1
Qatar	•	•	•	•	•	•	•	•											GS		QF										2
Saudi Arabia	•	•	•	•	•	•	•	•											GS			GS						GS			3
South Korea	•	•	•	•	•	•	•	•		QF				GS						GS	GS	GS	GS	QF	GS	3rd	QF	QF			11
Syria	•	•	•	•	•	•	•	•										GS													1
Thailand	•	•	•	•	•	•	•	•				GS			GS																2
United Arab Emirates	•	Not a member of AFC																								GS					1
Uzbekistan	Not a member of AFC																												GS		1
Total (21 teams)	0	0	0	0	0	0	0	0	2	4	1	4	2	3	3	3	3	3	3	3	3	3	3	3	4	3	3	4	3	2	63

==== Women's tournament ====
Olympic Games (Women's tournament) record
Team	1996 (United States) (8)	2000 (Australia) (8)	2004 (Greece) (10)	2008 (China) (12)	2012 (United Kingdom) (12)	2016 (Brazil) (12)	2020 (Japan) (12)	2024 (France) (12)	2028 (United States) (16)	Years
Australia	Part of OFC			–	–	7th	4th	9th		3
China	2nd	5th	9th	5th	–	8th	10th	–		6
Japan	7th	–	7th	4th	2nd	–	8th	5th		6
North Korea	–	–	–	9th	9th	–	×	–		2
Total (4 teams)	2	1	2	3	2	2	3	2	2–3	17

=== AFC Women's Asian Cup ===
AFC Women's Asian Cup record
Team (Total 23 teams)	1975 (Hong Kong) (6)	1977 (Taiwan) (6)	1979 (India) (6)	1981 (Hong Kong) (8)	1983 (Thailand) (6)	1986 (Hong Kong) (7)	1989 (Hong Kong) (8)	1991 (Japan) (9)	1993 (Malaysia) (8)	1995 (Malaysia) (11)	1997 (China) (11)	1999 (Philippines) (15)	2001 (Chinese Taipei) (14)	2003 (Thailand) (14)	2006 (Australia) (9)	2008 (Vietnam) (8)	2010 (China) (8)	2014 (Vietnam) (8)	2018 (Jordan) (8)	2022 (India) (12)	2026 (Australia) (12)	2029 (Uzbekistan) (12)	Years
Australia	3rd		3rd												2nd	4th	1st	2nd	2nd	QF	2nd		9
Bangladesh																					GS		1
China						1st	1st	1st	1st	1st	1st	1st	3rd	2nd	1st	2nd	4th	3rd	3rd	1st	SF		16
Chinese Taipei		1st	1st	1st			2nd	3rd	4th	3rd	4th	2nd	GS	GS	GS	GS				QF	QF		15
Guam											GS	GS	GS	GS									4
Hong Kong	GS	GS	4th	4th	GS	GS	4th	GS	GS	GS	GS	GS	GS	GS									14
India			2nd	3rd	2nd					GS	GS	GS	GS	GS						WD (Note: India failed to name the required 13 players and were unable to play their match of the group stage against Chinese Taipei due to them having fewer than 13 players left with the remaining team members testing positive for COVID-19. They were considered to have withdrawn from the tournament, and all previous matches played by them were considered "null and void" and would not be considered in determining the final group rankings.)	GS		10
Indonesia		4th		GS		4th	GS													GS			5
Iran																				GS	GS		2
Japan		GS		GS		2nd	3rd	2nd	3rd	2nd	3rd	4th	2nd	4th	4th	3rd	3rd	1st	1st	SF	1st		18
Jordan																		GS	GS				2
Kazakhstan										GS	GS	GS		Part of UEFA									3
Malaysia	4th		GS		3rd	GS		GS	GS	GS		GS	GS										9
Myanmar														GS	GS		GS	GS		GS			5
Nepal						GS	GS					GS											3
New Zealand	1st																						1
North Korea							GS	4th	2nd		2nd	3rd	1st	1st	3rd	1st	2nd				QF		11
Philippines				GS	GS				GS	GS	GS	GS	GS	GS					6th	SF	QF		11
Singapore	GS	3rd		GS	4th			GS					GS	GS									7
South Korea								GS	GS	4th	GS	GS	4th	3rd	GS	GS	GS	4th	5th	2nd	SF		14
Thailand	2nd	2nd		2nd	1st	3rd	GS	GS		GS		GS	GS	GS	GS	GS	GS	5th	4th	QF			17
Uzbekistan										GS	GS	GS	GS	GS							QF	Q	7
Vietnam												GS	GS	GS	GS	GS	GS	6th	GS	QF	GS		10

=== FIFA U-20 World Cup ===
FIFA U-20 World Cup record
Team	1977 (Tunisia) (16)	1979 (Japan) (16)	1981 (Australia) (16)	1983 (Mexico) (16)	1985 (Soviet Union) (16)	1987 (Chile) (16)	1989 (Saudi Arabia) (16)	1991 (Portugal) (16)	1993 (Australia) (16)	1995 (Qatar) (16)	1997 (Malaysia) (24)	1999 (Nigeria) (24)	2001 (Argentina) (24)	2003 (United Arab Emirates) (24)	2005 (Netherlands) (24)	2007 (Canada) (24)	2009 (Egypt) (24)	2011 (Colombia) (24)	2013 (Turkey) (24)	2015 (New Zealand) (24)	2017 (South Korea) (24)	2019 (Poland) (24)	2023 (Argentina) (24)	2025 (Chile) (24)	Years
Australia	Part of OFC															•	R1	R1	R1	•	•	•	•	R1	4
Bahrain	•	•	•	•	•	R1	•	•	•	•	•	•	•	•	•	•	•	•	•	•	•	•	•	•	1
China	•	•	•	R1	QF	•	•	•	•	•	R1	•	R2	•	R2	•	•	•	•	•	•	•	•	•	5
Indonesia	•	R1	•	•	•	•	•	•	•	•	•	•	•	•	•	•	•	•	•	•	•	•	•	•	1
Iran	R1	•	•	•	•	•	•	•	•	•	•	•	R1	•	•	•	•	•	•	•	R1	•	•	•	3
Iraq	R1	•	•	•	•	•	QF	•	•	•	•	•	R1	•	•	•	•	•	4th	•	•	•	R1	•	5
Japan	•	R1	•	•	•	•	•	•	•	QF	QF	2nd	R1	QF	R2	R2	•	•	•	•	R2	R2	R1	R2	12
Jordan	•	•	•	•	•	•	•	•	•	•	•	•	•	•	•	R1	•	•	•	•	•	•	•	•	1
Kazakhstan	Part of USSR								•	•	•	R1	•	Part of UEFA											1
Malaysia	•	•	•	•	•	•	•	•	•	•	R1	•	•	•	•	•	•	•	•	•	•	•	•	•	1
Myanmar	•	•	•	•	•	•	•	•	•	•	•	•	•	•	•	•	•	•	•	R1	•	•	•	•	1
North Korea	•	•	•	•	•	•	•	•	•	•	•	•	•	•	•	R1	•	R1	•	R1	•	•	•	•	3
Qatar	•	•	2nd	•	•	•	•	•	•	R1	•	•	•	•	•	•	•	•	•	R1	•	R1	•	•	4
Saudi Arabia	•	•	•	•	R1	R1	R1	•	R1	•	•	R1	•	R1	•	•	•	R2	•	•	R2	R1	•	R1	10
South Korea	•	R1	R1	4th	•	•	•	QF	R1	•	R1	R1	•	R2	R1	R1	QF	R2	QF	•	R2	2nd	4th	R2	17
Syria	•	•	•	•	•	•	R1	QF	•	R1	•	•	•	•	R2	•	•	•	•	•	•	•	•	•	4
United Arab Emirates	•	•	•	•	•	•	•	•	•	•	R2	•	•	QF	•	•	QF	•	•	•	•	•	•	•	3
Uzbekistan	Part of USSR								•	•	•	•	•	R1	•	•	R1	•	QF	QF	•	•	R2	•	5
Vietnam	•	•	•	•	•	•	•	•	•	•	•	•	•	•	•	•	•	•	•	•	R1	•	•	•	1
Total (19 teams)	2	3	2	2	2	2	3	2	2	3	5	4	4	5	4	4	4	4	4	4	5	4	4	4	82

=== FIFA U-20 Women's World Cup ===
FIFA U-20 Women's World Cup record
Team	2002 (Canada) (12)	2004 (Thailand) (12)	2006 (Russia) (16)	2008 (Chile) (16)	2010 (Germany) (16)	2012 (Japan) (16)	2014 (Canada) (16)	2016 (Papua New Guinea) (16)	2018 (France) (16)	2022 (Costa Rica) (16)	2024 (Colombia) (24)	2026 (Poland) (24)	Years
Australia	Part of OFC		R1	•	•	•	•	•	•	R1	R1	•	3
China	•	2nd	2nd	R1	•	R1	R1	•	R1	•	•	R2	7
Chinese Taipei	R1	•	•	•	•	•	•	•	•	•	•	•	1
Japan	QF	•	•	QF	R1	3rd	•	3rd	1st	2nd	2nd	R2	9
North Korea	•	•	1st	2nd	QF	QF	4th	1st	QF	•	1st	2nd	9
South Korea	•	R1	•	•	3rd	QF	QF	R1	•	R1	R2	QF	8
Thailand	•	R1	•	•	•	•	•	•	•	•	•	•	1
Total (7 teams)	2	3	3	3	3	4	3	3	3	3	4	4	38

=== FIFA U-17 World Cup ===
FIFA U-17 World Cup record
Team	1985 (China) (16)	1987 (Canada) (16)	1989 (Scotland) (16)	1991 (Italy) (16)	1993 (Japan) (16)	1995 (Ecuador) (16)	1997 (Egypt) (16)	1999 (New Zealand) (16)	2001 (Trinidad and Tobago) (16)	2003 (Finland) (16)	2005 (Peru) (16)	2007 (South Korea) (24)	2009 (Nigeria) (24)	2011 (Mexico) (24)	2013 (United Arab Emirates) (24)	2015 (Chile) (24)	2017 (India) (24)	2019 (Brazil) (24)	2023 (Indonesia) (24)	2025 (Qatar) (48)	2026 (Qatar) (48)	2027 (Qatar) (48)	2028 (Qatar) (48)	2029 (Qatar) (48)	Years
Australia	Part of OFC											•	•	R2	•	R2	•	R2	•	•	Q				4
Bahrain	•	•	4th	•	•	•	R1	•	•	•	•	•	•	•	•	•	•	•	•	•	•				2
China	QF	•	R1	R1	R1	•	•	•	•	R1	QF	•	•	•	•	•	•	•	•	•	Q				7
India	•	•	•	•	•	•	•	•	•	•	•	•	•	•	•	•	R1	•	•	•	•				1
Indonesia	•	•	•	•	•	•	•	•	•	•	•	•	•	•	•	•	•	•	R1	R1	•				2
Iran	•	•	•	•	•	•	•	•	R1	•	•	•	R2	•	R2	•	QF	•	R2	•	•				5
Iraq	•	•	•	•	•	•	•	•	•	•	•	•	•	•	R1	•	R2	•	•	•	•				2
Japan	•	•	•	•	QF	R1	•	•	R1	•	•	R1	R1	QF	R2	•	R2	R2	R2	QF	Q				12
North Korea	•	•	•	•	•	•	•	•	•	•	QF	R2	•	R1	•	R2	R1	•	•	R3	•				6
Oman	•	•	•	•	•	4th	QF	•	R1	•	•	•	•	•	•	•	•	•	•	•	•				3
Qatar	R1	QF	•	4th	R1	R1	•	QF	•	•	R1	•	•	•	•	•	•	•	•	R1	Q	Q	Q	Q	12
Saudi Arabia	QF	R1	1st	•	•	•	•	•	•	•	•	•	•	•	•	•	•	•	•	R1	Q				5
South Korea	•	QF	•	•	•	•	•	•	•	R1	•	R1	QF	•	•	R2	•	QF	R1	R2	Q				9
Syria	•	•	•	•	•	•	•	•	•	•	•	R2	•	•	•	R1	•	•	•	•	•				2
Tajikistan	Part of USSR				•	•	•	•	•	•	•	R2	•	•	•	•	•	R1	•	R1	Q				4
Thailand	•	•	•	•	•	•	R1	R1	•	•	•	•	•	•	•	•	•	•	•	•	•				2
United Arab Emirates	•	•	•	R1	•	•	•	•	•	•	•	•	R2	•	R1	•	•	•	•	R1	•				4
Uzbekistan	Part of USSR				•	•	•	•	•	•	•	•	•	QF	R2	•	•	•	QF	R3	Q				5
Vietnam	•	•	•	•	•	•	•	•	•	•	•	•	•	•	•	•	•	•	•	•	Q				1
Yemen	•	•	•	•	•	•	•	•	•	R1	•	•	•	•	•	•	•	•	•	•	•				1
Total (20 teams)	3	3	3	3	3	3	3	2	3	3	3	5	4	4	5	4	5	4	5	9	9	9	9	9	81

=== FIFA U-17 Women's World Cup ===
FIFA U-17 Women's World Cup record
Team	2008 (New Zealand) (16)	2010 (Trinidad and Tobago) (16)	2012 (Azerbaijan) (16)	2014 (Costa Rica) (16)	2016 (Jordan) (16)	2018 (Uruguay) (16)	2022 (India) (16)	2024 (Dominican Republic) (16)	2025 (Morocco) (24)	2026 (Morocco) (24)	2027 (Morocco) (24)	2028 (Morocco) (24)	2029 (Morocco) (24)	Years
Australia	•	•	•	•	•	•	•	•	•	R1				1
China	•	•	R1	R1	•	•	R1	•	R2	Q				5
India	•	•	•	•	•	•	R1	•	•	•				1
Japan	QF	2nd	QF	1st	2nd	QF	QF	QF	QF	Q				10
Jordan	•	•	•	•	R1	•	•	•	•	•				1
North Korea	1st	4th	2nd	R1	1st	QF	•	1st	1st	Q				9
South Korea	QF	1st	•	•	•	R1	•	R1	R1	•				5
Total (7 teams)	3	3	3	3	3	3	3	3	4	4				32

=== FIFA Futsal World Cup ===
FIFA Futsal World Cup record
Team	(Netherlands) 1989 (16)	(Hong Kong) 1992 (16)	(Spain) 1996 (16)	(Guatemala) 2000 (16)	(Chinese Taipei) 2004 (16)	(Brazil) 2008 (20)	(Thailand) 2012 (24)	(Colombia) 2016 (24)	(Lithuania) 2021 (24)	(Uzbekistan) 2024 (24)	Years
Afghanistan										R2	1
Australia							R1	R1			2
China		R1	R1			R1					3
Chinese Taipei					R1						1
Hong Kong		R1									1
Iran		4th	R1	R1	R1	R2	R2	3rd	QF	R2	9
Japan	R1				R1	R1	R2		R2		5
Kazakhstan				R1							1
Kuwait							R1				1
Malaysia			R1								1
Saudi Arabia	R1										1
Tajikistan										R1	1
Thailand				R1	R1	R1	R2	R2	R2	R2	7
Uzbekistan								R1	R2	R1	3
Vietnam								R2	R2		2
Total (15 teams)	2	3	3	3	4	4	5	5	5	5	39

=== FIFA Beach Soccer World Cup ===
FIFA Beach Soccer World Cup record
Team	1995 (Brazil) (8)	1996 (Brazil) (8)	1997 (Brazil) (8)	1998 (Brazil) (10)	1999 (Brazil) (12)	2000 (Brazil) (12)	2001 (Brazil) (12)	2002 (Brazil) (8)	2003 (Brazil) (8)	2004 (Brazil) (12)	2005 (Brazil) (12)	2006 (Brazil) (16)	2007 (Brazil) (16)	2008 (France) (16)	2009 (United Arab Emirates) (16)	2011 (Italy) (16)	2013 (French Polynesia) (16)	2015 (Portugal) (16)	2017 (The Bahamas) (16)	2019 (Paraguay) (16)	2021 (Russia) (16)	2024 (United Arab Emirates) (16)	2025 (Seychelles) (16)	Years
Bahrain	•	•	•	•	•	•	•	•	•	•	•	QF	•	•	R1	•	•	•	•	•	•	•	•	2
Japan	•	•	R1	•	QF	4th	R1	•	•	•	4th	QF	R1	R1	QF	R1	QF	QF	R1	4th	2nd	QF	QF	17
Iran	•	•	•	•	•	•	•	•	•	•	•	R1	R1	R1	•	R1	QF	QF	3rd	•	•	3rd	QF	9
Malaysia	•	•	•	•	R1	•	•	•	•	•	•	•	•	•	•	•	•	•	•	•	•	•	•	1
Oman	•	•	•	•	•	•	•	•	•	•	•	•	•	•	•	R1	•	R1	•	R1	R1	R1	R1	6
Thailand	•	•	•	•	•	•	•	4th	•	•	R1	•	•	•	•	•	•	•	•	•	•	•	•	2
United Arab Emirates	•	•	•	•	•	•	•	•	•	•	•	•	R1	R1	R1	•	R1	•	R1	R1	R1	QF	•	8
Total (7 teams)	0	0	1	0	2	1	1	1	0	0	2	3	3	3	3	3	3	3	3	3	3	4	3	45

=== Former tournaments ===
==== FIFA Confederations Cup ====
FIFA Confederations Cup record
Team	1992 (Saudi Arabia) (4)	1995 (Saudi Arabia) (6)	1997 (Saudi Arabia) (8)	1999 (Mexico) (8)	2001 (South Korea) (Japan) (8)	2003 (France) (8)	2005 (Germany) (8)	2009 (South Africa) (8)	2013 (Brazil) (8)	2017 (Russia) (8)	Years
Australia	Part of OFC							•	•	GS	1
Iraq	•	•	•	•	•	•	•	GS	•	•	1
Japan	•	GS	•	•	2nd	GS	GS	•	GS	•	5
Saudi Arabia	2nd	GS	GS	4th	•	•	•	•	•	•	4
South Korea	•	•	•	•	GS	•	•	•	•	•	1
United Arab Emirates	•	•	GS	•	•	•	•	•	•	•	1
Total (6 teams)	1	2	2	1	2	1	1	1	1	1	13

== See also ==
- AFC Annual Awards
- List of presidents of AFC
- International Federation of Association Football (FIFA)
  - Oceania Football Confederation (OFC)
  - Confederation of African Football (CAF)
  - Confederation of North, Central America and Caribbean Association Football (CONCACAF)
  - Confederation of South American Football (CONMEBOL)
  - Union of European Football Associations (UEFA)
- List of association football competitions
