= UEFA Nations League =

European football competition

- Organiser(s): UEFA
- Founded: 2018; 8 years ago
- Region: Europe
- Teams: 55
- Current champions: Portugal (2nd title)
- Most championships: Portugal (2 titles)
- Website: uefa.com/nationsleague
- 2026–27 UEFA Nations League

The UEFA Nations League is an international European football competition played by the senior men's national teams of the member associations of UEFA, the sport's European governing body. The competition was devised to minimise friendlies and give nations competitive encounters with equally ranked teams. Teams from all the European associations compete in a league structure featuring promotion and relegation.

The first tournament was held in September 2018, where Portugal emerged as the inaugural tournament champions. Since then, four editions have been played. The tournament has been hosted across Europe, including in Portugal, Italy, the Netherlands, and Germany. The UEFA Nations League is held every two years with the finals taking place in odd-numbered years.

== Adoption ==
Since 1999, various UEFA bodies had discussed national associations' needs for more competitive fixtures, including more attractive international friendlies, more competitive matches and increased revenue. In 2001, UEFA proposed three potential formats for a new national team competition, with a first edition tentatively planned for 2004–2007. However, this ultimately did not come to fruition.

In October 2013, Norwegian Football Association president Yngve Hallén confirmed that talks had been held to create a third full national-team international tournament for UEFA members, alongside the FIFA World Cup and UEFA European Championship.

The concept of the UEFA Nations League would see all of UEFA's member associations' national teams divided into a series of groups based upon a ranking formulated using their recent results, where they would be promoted and relegated to other groups according to their results within the group. The proposed tournament would take place on dates on the FIFA International Match Calendar that were previously allocated for international friendlies and would not affect the FIFA World Cup or UEFA European Championship.

In March 2014, UEFA general secretary Gianni Infantino stated that one of the benefits of the proposal would be to help "less glamorous" national associations arrange games. The Royal Belgian Football Association's general secretary, Steven Martens, said that lower-ranked nations would still benefit financially from the competition, as the television contract with UEFA would be centralised. The UEFA Nations League was unanimously adopted by the 54 UEFA member associations at the XXXVIII Ordinary UEFA Congress in Astana on 27 March 2014.

== Format ==
=== Original format ===
The 55 UEFA national teams were divided into four leagues: 12 teams in League A; 12 teams in League B; 15 teams in League C; and 16 teams in League D. In each league, four groups were formed (with three or four teams) and teams played each other both home and away.

=== Adjustment starting from 2020–21 ===
After the completion of the first season, UEFA decided to adjust the format of the Nations League starting from the 2020–21 season. The new league structure comprised 16 teams in Leagues A, B, and C and seven teams in League D.

The transition to the new format occurred by making various one-time changes after the 2018–19 season, namely the suspension of relegations in both League A and League B, the promotion of the two best teams per group in both League C and League D (instead of only one team per group), and the promotion of the best third-placed team from League D.

This change to the format followed a collective consultation process, whereby all UEFA national associations reiterated their intent to further reduce the number of friendly matches. The number of competitive matches was increased from 142 to 168, thus increasing the commercial value and viewer appeal of the competition. Almost all teams in the same group played their last match simultaneously with the aim of promoting fairness. More matches were played within Leagues A and B, with the two leagues now incorporating competition between the 32 highest-ranked UEFA national associations, instead of the previous system where Leagues A and B together only incorporated 24 of the highest-ranked UEFA national associations.

=== Finals, promotion, and relegation ===
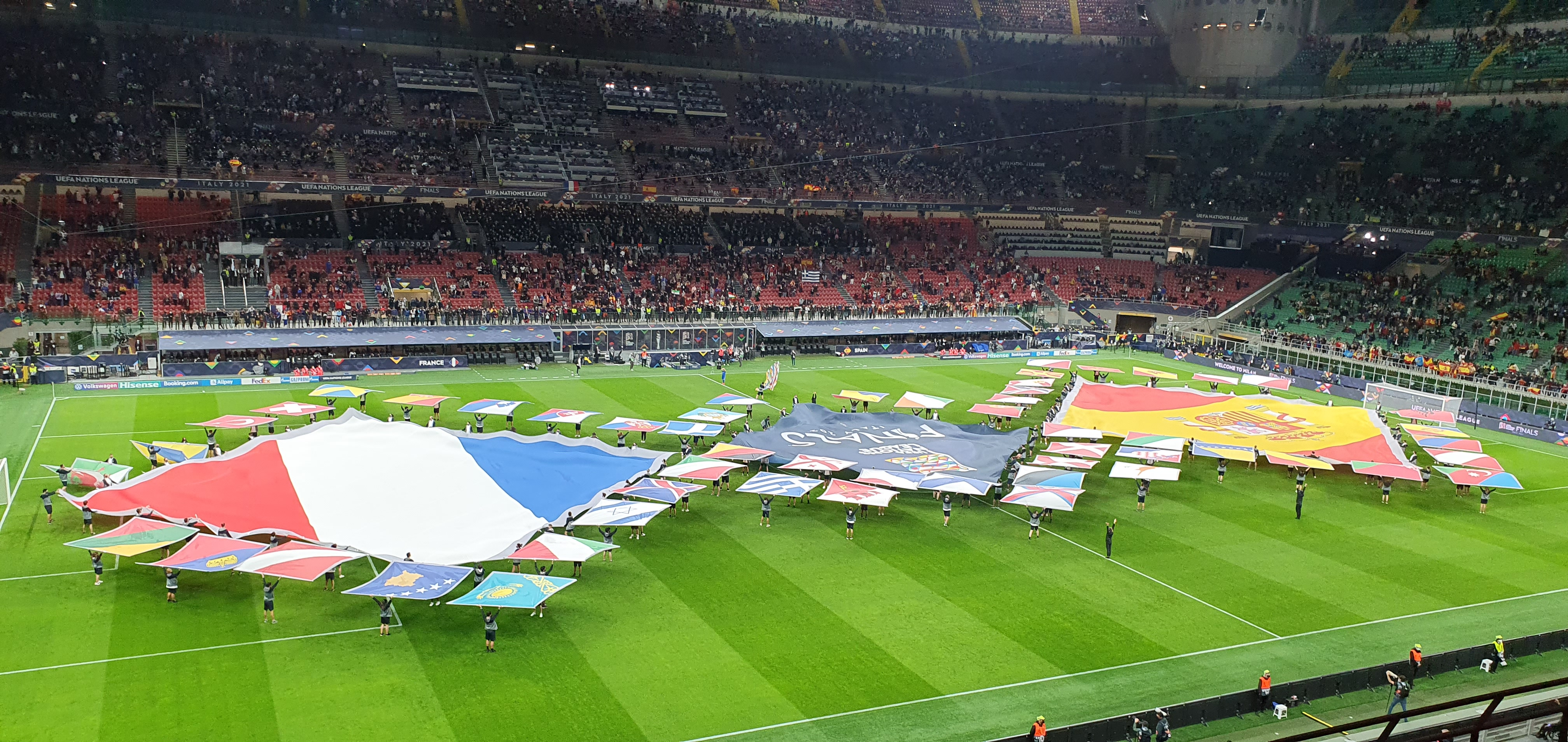
Pre-show at the 2021 UEFA Nations League Finals in Milan, Italy with France playing against Spain

In the top league, League A, the winners of the four groups go on to play in the Nations League Finals, with two semi finals, a third and fourth-place decider, and a final to decide which team becomes the UEFA Nations League champion. Beginning in 2024–25, the group winners and runners-up of League A advance to a new two-legged home-and-away quarter-final round. In each tie, group winners will face a runner-up from a different group, with the group winner hosting the second leg. The four quarter-final winners advance to the Nations League Finals using the same rules above.

Teams can also be promoted and relegated to a higher or lower league. Starting in 2020–21, each group winner in Leagues B, C, and D is automatically promoted to the next higher league while the last-placed team in each group in Leagues A and B is automatically relegated to the next lower league for the next tournament. From 2020–21 to 2022–23, the League C teams to be relegated were determined by play-outs among fourth-placed teams, the specific ties being based on the teams' Nations League overall ranking. The teams that won on aggregate over two legs remained in League C while the losing teams were relegated to League D.

Starting in 2024–25, the two worst-ranked League C teams will automatically be relegated. Furthermore, promotion/relegation play-offs were introduced, with the third-placed teams of League A facing the runners-up of League B, the third-placed teams of League B facing the runners-up of League C, and the two best-ranked fourth-placed teams of League C facing the runners-up of League D, with the winners going to the higher league and the losers entering the lower league. In all cases, the higher-ranked team hosts the second leg. If the aggregate score is level, extra time will be played without the away goals rule enforced, and if it is still tied after extra time, a penalty shoot-out will be used to decide the winner, as per guidelines by the UEFA Executive Committee on 16 December 2021.

=== UEFA European Championship link ===
The UEFA Nations League is linked with the UEFA European Championship qualifying, providing teams another chance to qualify for the UEFA European Championship.

There were play-offs for each of Leagues A, B, C, and D in October and November 2020. Each group winner earned a spot in the semi-finals. If the group winner was already one of the 20 qualified teams, rankings were used to give the play-off spot to another team of that league. If fewer than four teams in the entire league remained unqualified, play-off spots for that league were given to teams of the next lower league. This determined the four remaining qualifying spots for the European Championship (out of 24 total). However, starting with UEFA Euro 2024 onward, the now-downsized League D will no longer be given its own path. Instead, if any of Leagues A, B, or C have fewer than four teams that did not qualify directly for Euro 2024, the best-ranked group winner of League D will advance to the play-offs (unless that team already qualified for the final tournament). The remaining spots will be allocated based on the Nations League overall ranking, however, group winners from Leagues B and C cannot face teams from a higher league. Therefore, additional teams from League D can only advance to the play-offs if enough teams from League C qualify directly.

=== FIFA World Cup link ===
The Nations League was linked with European qualification for the 2022 FIFA World Cup, although to a lesser degree than the UEFA European Championship qualifying play-offs. The first round of the 2022 World Cup qualification consisted of ten groups, with each group winner directly qualified for the World Cup. Then, the second round (which followed a playoff format) was contested by the ten group runners-up, plus the best two Nations League group winners (based on the Nations League overall ranking) that finished outside the top two of their qualifying group. The playoffs were split into three playoff paths, played in two semi-finals (hosted by the seeded teams) and the final (with the home teams to be drawn), from which an additional three teams also qualified.

For 2026, it would be again partially linked with European qualification for the 2026 FIFA World Cup. The first round of the 2026 World Cup qualification consisted of twelve groups, with each group winner qualified directly for the World Cup. Then, in the second round, the twelve qualifying group runners-up and the four best-ranked Nations League group winners who are not qualifying group winners or runners-up will be drawn into four play-off paths of single-leg semi-finals and single-leg finals to determine the last four UEFA teams to qualify for the World Cup.

In an interview with the Polish website meczyki.pl, UEFA vice-president Zbigniew Boniek said that all 10 teams from CONMEBOL, the South American Football Confederation, would join the UEFA Nations League from the 2024–25 edition of the competition. The plans, which would have acted as a response to FIFA's biennial World Cup plans, were intended as part of enhanced cooperation between the two organisations following the signing of a memorandum of understanding and the opening of a joint office in London. However, such an expansion was made unlikely after CONMEBOL submitted a request to FIFA to maintain the round-robin qualification format for the 2026 FIFA World Cup. On 25 January 2023, the UEFA Executive Committee confirmed the format for the 2024–25 UEFA Nations League, with no South American teams to be added.

=== Post–2028 review and proposed format changes ===
On 20 May 2026, UEFA approved a new review framework for its men's national team competitions beginning after 2028, including major proposed changes to the UEFA Nations League and European Qualifiers formats.

Under the proposed Nations League structure, the competition would be reduced from four leagues to three leagues of 18 teams each (Leagues A, B, and C). Each league would contain three groups of six teams, with every team playing six matches during the league phase. Teams would play home-and-away matches against the other team from their own seeding pot and one match (either home or away) against four teams from the other pots "to ensure balanced opposition."

The revised format would also continue to include promotion and relegation between leagues, as well as quarter-finals and Finals phases for League A.

UEFA also presented a parallel reform of the European Qualifiers structure. Under the proposal, qualifying would be reorganised into two leagues: League 1 with 36 teams and League 2 with 18 teams. League 1 would consist of three groups of 12 teams, with each team playing six matches against two opponents from each seeding pot. League 2 would consist of three groups of six teams using the same match system as the revised Nations League format.

According to UEFA’s review documents, the transition system between the Nations League and the European Qualifiers would affect promotion and relegation pathways differently: changes between Leagues B and C would apply to both the next Nations League and European Qualifying cycle, while changes between Leagues A and B would only apply to the next Nations League edition.

In August 2026, UEFA and CONCACAF were reported to be discussing a joint Nations League involving all 96 member associations, potentially starting in 2028. The biennial competition would follow a multi-league format, with matches from September to June, replacing existing fixtures and using geographical scheduling to reduce travel.

== Trophy ==
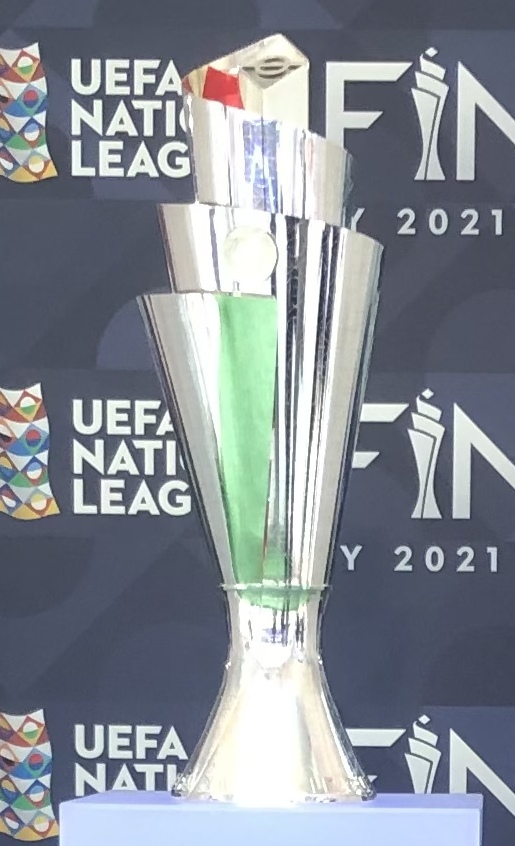
UEFA Nations League Trophy.

The UEFA Nations League trophy was unveiled during the phase draw in Lausanne, Switzerland. The trophy represents all 55 UEFA National associations and is made of sterling silver. The trophy weighs 7.5 kg (240 ozt) and is 71 cm (28 in) tall.

== Anthem ==
The official anthem of the UEFA Nations League was recorded with the Netherlands Radio Philharmonic Orchestra and Choir, singing in Latin. It is a mix of classical and electronic music, and is played when the players are entering the field of play, in television sequences and for ceremonial purposes. The composers are Giorgio Tuinfort and Franck van der Heijden.

== Seasons ==
Each season of the UEFA Nations League is played in a typical UEFA competition season format: the league phase (or "group stage") in the first half of the season from September to November, and the knockout phase in the second half of the season in March (League A quarter-finals and promotion/relegation play-offs), and June (semifinals and finals of League A) respectively, meaning a UEFA Nations League champion is crowned every two years. An exception was made in the 2022–23 season when the league phase was played in June and September 2022, because the 2022 FIFA World Cup was held in Qatar at the end of the year.

== Finals ==
| Season | Finals host | Final | | | Third place play-off | | |
| Season | Finals host | Winners | Score | Runners-up | Third place | Score | Fourth place |
|---|---|---|---|---|---|---|---|
| 2018–19; Finals | Portugal | Portugal | 1–0 | Netherlands | England | 0–0 (a.e.t.) (6–5 p) | Switzerland |
| 2020–21; Finals | Italy | France | 2–1 | Spain | Italy | 2–1 | Belgium |
| 2022–23; Finals | Netherlands | Spain | 0–0 (a.e.t.) (5–4 p) | Croatia | Italy | 3–2 | Netherlands |
| 2024–25; Finals | Germany | Portugal | 2–2 (a.e.t.) (5–3 p) | Spain | France | 2–0 | Germany |
| 2026–27; Finals | TBD | TBD | | | TBD | | |

== Teams reaching the top four ==
Key

- * denotes host of final tournament

| Team | Winners | Runners-up | Third place | Fourth place | Total |
|---|---|---|---|---|---|
| Portugal | 2 (2019*, 2025) | | | | 2 |
| Spain | 1 (2023) | 2 (2021, 2025) | | | 3 |
| France | 1 (2021) | | 1 (2025) | | 2 |
| Netherlands | | 1 (2019) | | 1 (2023*) | 2 |
| Croatia | | 1 (2023) | | | 1 |
| Italy | | | 2 (2021*, 2023) | | 2 |
| England | | | 1 (2019) | | 1 |
| Switzerland | | | | 1 (2019) | 1 |
| Belgium | | | | 1 (2021) | 1 |
| Germany | | | | 1 (2025*) | 1 |

== Records and statistics ==
=== Top goalscorers ===
As of matches played 16 November 2026

| Rank | Player | Goals |
|---|---|---|
| 1 | (Norway) Erling Haaland | 23 |
| 2 | (Sweden) Viktor Gyökeres | 16 |
| 3 | (Serbia) Aleksandar Mitrović | 15 |
| 3 | (Portugal) Cristiano Ronaldo | 15 |
| 5 | (England) Harry Kane | 14 |
| 5 | (Belgium) Romelu Lukaku | 14 |
| 5 | (Kosovo) Vedat Muriqi | 14 |
| 8 | (France) Kylian Mbappé | 10 |
| 8 | (Luxembourg) Danel Sinani | 10 |
| 10 | (Bosnia and Herzegovina) Edin Džeko | 9 |
| 10 | (Denmark) Christian Eriksen | 9 |
| 10 | (Iceland) Orri Óskarsson | 9 |
| 10 | (Spain) Mikel Oyarzabal | 9 |

=== Top goalscorers by tournament ===
| Season | League A | | League B | | League C | | League D | |
| Season | Player(s) | Goals | Player(s) | Goals | Player(s) | Goals | Player(s) | Goals |
|---|---|---|---|---|---|---|---|---|
| 2018–19 | (Switzerland) Haris Seferovic | 5 | (Bosnia and Herzegovina) Edin Džeko (Czech Republic) Patrik Schick | 3 | (Serbia) Aleksandar Mitrović | 6 | (Armenia) Yura Movsisyan (Belarus) Stanislaw Drahun | 5 |
| 2020–21 | (Belgium) Romelu Lukaku (Spain) Ferran Torres | 6 | (Norway) Erling Haaland | 6 | (Albania) Sokol Cikalleshi (Estonia) Rauno Sappinen (Montenegro) Stevan Jovetić (Slovenia) Haris Vučkić | 4 | (Faroe Islands) Klæmint Olsen | 4 |
| 2022–23 | (Belgium) Michy Batshuayi (Croatia) Luka Modrić (Netherlands) Steven Bergwijn (Netherlands) Memphis Depay | 3 | (Norway) Erling Haaland (Serbia) Aleksandar Mitrović | 6 | (Georgia (country)) Khvicha Kvaratskhelia (Kosovo) Vedat Muriqi | 5 | (Latvia) Vladislavs Gutkovskis | 5 |
| 2024–25 | (Portugal) Cristiano Ronaldo | 8 | (Norway) Erling Haaland | 7 | (Sweden) Viktor Gyökeres | 9 | (Gibraltar) Liam Walker (San Marino) Nicola Nanni | 2 |

== Comprehensive team results by tournament ==
- 1 – Champions
- 2 – Runners-up
- 3 – Third place
- 4 – Fourth place
- – Quarter-finals (from the 2024–25 season onwards, ranked based on final overall ranking)
- ▲ – Promoted
- – No movement
- ▼ – Relegated
- * – Participated in promotion/relegation play-offs
- ▲† – Promoted after post-tournament format change
- † – Avoided relegation after post-tournament format change
- Q – Qualified for upcoming UEFA Nations League Finals
- P/R – Qualified for upcoming promotion/relegation play-offs
- – Host country of UEFA Nations League Finals

| National team | Seasons in league | | | | Season | | | | | | | | | | | | | | |
| National team | Seasons in league | | | | 2018–19 | | | 2020–21 | | | 2022–23 | | | 2024–25 | | | 2026–27 | | |
| National team | A | B | C | D | Lg | Rk | M | Lg | Rk | M | Lg | Rk | M | Lg | Rk | M | Lg | Rk | M |
|---|---|---|---|---|---|---|---|---|---|---|---|---|---|---|---|---|---|---|---|
| Albania | — | 2 | 3 | — | C | 34 | Same position | C | 35 | ▲ | B | 27 | Same position | B | 29 | ▼ | C | | ▲ |
| Andorra | — | — | 1 | 5 | D | 53 | Same position | D | 55 | Same position | D | 53 | Same position | D | 54 | Same position | D | 52 | ▲ |
| Armenia | — | 1 | 3 | 1 | D | 45 | ▲† | C | 36 | ▲ | B | 31 | ▼ | C | 40 | * | C | 43 | Same position |
| Austria | 1 | 4 | — | — | B | 18 | Same position | B | 18 | ▲ | A | 13 | ▼ | B | 22 | * | B | | ▲ |
| Azerbaijan | — | — | 4 | 2 | D | 46 | ▲† | C | 43 | Same position | C | 38 | Same position | C | 47 | ▼ | D | 50 | ▲ |
| Belarus | — | — | 4 | 1 | D | 43 | ▲ | C | 38 | Same position | C | 46 | Same position | C | 41 | Same position | C | | |
| Belgium | 5 | — | — | — | A | 5 | Same position | A | 4 | Same position | A | 7 | Same position | A | 12 | * | A | | Same position |
| Bosnia and Herzegovina | 2 | 3 | — | — | B | 13 | ▲ | A | 15 | ▼ | B | 18 | ▲ | A | 16 | ▼ | B | | |
| Bulgaria | — | 1 | 4 | — | C | 29 | ▲† | B | 31 | ▼ | C | 40 | Same position | C | 39 | * | C | 44 | Same position |
| Croatia | 5 | — | — | — | A | 9 | † | A | 12 | Same position | A | 2 | Same position | A | 8 | Same position | A | | |
| Cyprus | — | — | 5 | — | C | 36 | † | C | 46 | * | C | 45 | Same position | C | 43 | Same position | C | | |
| Czech Republic | 2 | 3 | — | — | B | 20 | Same position | B | 19 | ▲ | A | 14 | ▼ | B | 20 | ▲ | A | | ▼ |
| Denmark | 4 | 1 | — | — | B | 15 | ▲ | A | 7 | Same position | A | 5 | Same position | A | 7 | Same position | A | | |
| England | 4 | 1 | — | — | A | 3 | Same position | A | 9 | Same position | A | 15 | ▼ | B | 17 | ▲ | A | | Same position |
| Estonia | — | — | 4 | 1 | C | 37 | † | C | 47 | ▼* | D | 49 | ▲ | C | 44 | Same position | C | | |
| Faroe Islands | — | — | 3 | 2 | D | 50 | Same position | D | 50 | ▲ | C | 41 | Same position | C | 42 | Same position | C | | |
| Finland | — | 3 | 2 | — | C | 28 | ▲ | B | 21 | Same position | B | 21 | Same position | B | 32 | ▼ | C | 41 | Same position |
| France | 5 | — | — | — | A | 6 | Same position | A | 1 | Same position | A | 12 | Same position | A | 3 | Same position | A | | Same position |
| Georgia | — | 2 | 2 | 1 | D | 40 | ▲ | C | 42 | Same position | C | 33 | ▲ | B | 26 | * | B | | |
| Germany | 5 | — | — | — | A | 11 | † | A | 8 | Same position | A | 10 | Same position | A | 4 | Same position | A | | Same position |
| Gibraltar | — | — | 2 | 4 | D | 49 | Same position | D | 49 | ▲ | C | 48 | ▼* | D | 52 | * | D | 53 | ▲ |
| Greece | 1 | 1 | 3 | — | C | 33 | Same position | C | 37 | Same position | C | 34 | ▲ | B | 21 | ▲* | A | 9 | Same position |
| Hungary | 2 | 2 | 1 | — | C | 31 | ▲† | B | 20 | ▲ | A | 8 | Same position | A | 11 | ▼* | B | | |
| Iceland | 2 | 2 | 1 | — | A | 12 | † | A | 16 | ▼ | B | 23 | Same position | B | 27 | ▼* | C | | ▲ |
| Israel | 1 | 3 | 1 | — | C | 30 | ▲† | B | 25 | Same position | B | 17 | ▲ | A | 14 | ▼ | B | | |
| Italy | 5 | — | — | — | A | 8 | Same position | A | 3 | Same position | A | 3 | Same position | A | 5 | Same position | A | 10 | Same position |
| Kazakhstan | — | 1 | 3 | 1 | D | 47 | ▲† | C | 45 | * | C | 36 | ▲ | B | 31 | ▼ | C | 45 | Same position |
| Kosovo | — | 1 | 3 | 1 | D | 42 | ▲ | C | 44 | Same position | C | 39 | Same position | C | 38 | ▲* | B | 27 | Same position |
| Latvia | — | — | 3 | 3 | D | 51 | Same position | D | 53 | Same position | D | 50 | ▲ | C | 45 | * | C | 47 | Same position |
| Liechtenstein | — | — | 1 | 5 | D | 52 | Same position | D | 51 | Same position | D | 55 | Same position | D | 53 | Same position | D | 54 | ▲ |
| Lithuania | — | — | 5 | 1 | C | 39 | † | C | 41 | Same position | C | 47 | * | C | 48 | ▼ | D | 51 | ▲ |
| Luxembourg | — | — | 4 | 1 | D | 44 | ▲† | C | 39 | Same position | C | 37 | Same position | C | 46 | * | C | 46 | Same position |
| Malta | — | — | 1 | 5 | D | 54 | Same position | D | 52 | Same position | D | 52 | Same position | D | 51 | * | D | 49 | ▲ |
| Moldova | — | — | 2 | 3 | D | 48 | ▲† | C | 48 | ▼* | D | 51 | Same position | D | 49 | ▲ | C | 42 | Same position |
| Montenegro | — | 2 | 3 | — | C | 35 | Same position | C | 34 | ▲ | B | 28 | Same position | B | 30 | ▼ | C | | ▲ |
| Netherlands | 5 | — | — | — | A | 2 | Same position | A | 6 | Same position | A | 4 | Same position | A | 6 | Same position | A | | Same position |
| North Macedonia | — | 1 | 3 | 1 | D | 41 | ▲ | C | 40 | Same position | C | 42 | Same position | C | 35 | ▲ | B | | |
| Northern Ireland | — | 3 | 2 | — | B | 24 | † | B | 32 | ▼ | C | 44 | Same position | C | 36 | ▲ | B | | ▲ |
| Norway | 1 | 3 | 1 | — | C | 26 | ▲ | B | 22 | Same position | B | 24 | Same position | B | 18 | ▲ | A | | Same position |
| Poland | 4 | 1 | — | — | A | 10 | † | A | 10 | Same position | A | 11 | Same position | A | 13 | ▼ | B | 28 | Same position |
| Portugal | 6 | — | — | — | A | 1 | Same position | A | 5 | Same position | A | 6 | Same position | A | 1 | Same position | A | | Same position |
| Republic of Ireland | — | 5 | — | — | B | 23 | † | B | 28 | Same position | B | 26 | Same position | B | 28 | * | B | | |
| Romania | — | 3 | 2 | — | C | 32 | ▲† | B | 26 | Same position | B | 29 | ▼ | C | 33 | ▲ | B | | |
| Russia | — | 2 (Note: Russia were included in the 2022–23 League B draw but on 2 May 2022, prior to any matches being played, UEFA announced that they were suspended and automatically relegated to League C.) | — | — | B | 17 | Same position | B | 24 | Same position | Suspended | | | | | | | | |
| San Marino | — | — | 2 | 4 | D | 55 | Same position | D | 54 | Same position | D | 54 | Same position | D | 50 | ▲ | C | 48 | Same position |
| Scotland | 1 | 3 | 1 | — | C | 25 | ▲ | B | 23 | Same position | B | 20 | ▲ | A | 9 | ▼* | B | 26 | Same position |
| Serbia | 2 | 2 | 1 | — | C | 27 | ▲ | B | 27 | Same position | B | 19 | ▲ | A | 10 | * | A | | |
| Slovakia | — | 2 | 3 | — | B | 21 | † | B | 30 | ▼ | C | 43 | Same position | C | 37 | * | C | | ▲ |
| Slovenia | — | 3 | 2 | — | C | 38 | † | C | 33 | ▲ | B | 25 | Same position | B | 25 | * | B | | |
| Spain | 6 | — | — | — | A | 7 | Same position | A | 2 | Same position | A | 1 | Same position | A | 2 | Same position | A | | Same position |
| Sweden | 1 | 3 | 1 | — | B | 16 | ▲ | A | 14 | ▼ | B | 30 | ▼ | C | 34 | ▲ | B | | ▲ |
| Switzerland | 4 | 1 | — | — | A | 4 | Same position | A | 11 | Same position | A | 9 | Same position | A | 15 | ▼ | B | | ▲ |
| Turkey | 1 | 3 | 1 | — | B | 22 | † | B | 29 | ▼ | C | 35 | ▲ | B | 23 | ▲* | A | | ▼ |
| Ukraine | 1 | 4 | — | — | B | 14 | ▲ | A | 13 | ▼ | B | 22 | Same position | B | 24 | * | B | 25 | Same position |
| Wales | 2 | 3 | — | — | B | 19 | Same position | B | 17 | ▲ | A | 16 | ▼ | B | 19 | ▲ | A | | |

== Reactions ==
=== Support ===
UEFA devised the tournament as a means to eliminate international friendlies – an aim that has been shared by many football clubs and supporters, with the regular football season being interrupted with non-competitive international matches as part of the FIFA International Match Calendar. Furthermore, it gives many countries who have not qualified for a major tournament a fighting chance.

In February 2012, it was agreed between UEFA and the European Club Association (ECA) that the international friendly schedule would be reduced from 12 to 9 matches a year with the August round of international friendlies in the UEFA confederation abolished from 2015. The aspiration to eliminate friendlies in favour of a more competitive tournament has been both welcomed and criticised by many football commentators.

Supporters more than most realise that most friendlies fail to deliver competitive and meaningful football. Now they will have the opportunity to see their teams play in more competitive matches, take part in a new competition and get a second chance to qualify for the major tournaments. There will certainly be fewer friendly internationals and undoubtedly fewer meaningless friendlies. However, there will still be space in the calendar for friendly internationals – particularly warm-up matches for final tournaments. UEFA is also keen that European teams will still have the chance to play opponents from other confederations.

— UEFA.

=== Criticism ===
The format has been criticised for allowing weaker teams to qualify through the Nations League to compete in the European Championship finals, instead of qualifying through the standard qualification process. However, once the tournament began in 2018, it got applause for "very high-level matches" and impressive turnouts in the initial round of fixtures. In November 2020, Toni Kroos accused FIFA and UEFA of treating players 'as puppets' by creating these new things like the Nations League and the expanded Club World Cup that are "driven by money".

Criticism of the Nations League resurfaced in 2022 when major footballers like Kevin de Bruyne and Virgil van Dijk condemned the Nations League as "unimportant" and only existing to glorify some friendlies as well as questioning the calendar due to possibility of injuries. Their stance is also shared by Jürgen Klopp, who called it "ridiculous". Croatia international Luka Modrić sparked even wider debate by criticising UEFA for making players play Nations League games so soon after the end of the season.

== Influence ==
Shortly after the foundation of the UEFA Nations League, CONCACAF, inspired by its success, announced that a similar competition format, the CONCACAF Nations League, would be established. The first edition was played in 2018. Also inspired by the recent success of the Nations League, the AFC had begun to formalise a similar competition, planned to begin in 2021 before being stalled due to the effect of the COVID-19. On 21 December 2025, the AFC announced the creation again, with a similar competition format, the AFC Nations League, would be established. On 20 December 2025, the CAF, announced a similar but a different competition format, the African Nations League, would be established and will take place in 2029.

== Awards ==
Player of the Tournament and Goal of the Tournament awards are presented for players' performances in the UEFA Nations League Finals.

| Year | Best Player | Best Goal | Top goalscorer | Ref. |
|---|---|---|---|---|
| 2019 | (Portugal) Bernardo Silva | (Portugal) Cristiano Ronaldo | (Serbia) Aleksandar Mitrović | |
| 2021 | (Spain) Sergio Busquets | (France) Karim Benzema | (Belgium) Romelu Lukaku (Norway) Erling Haaland (Spain) Ferran Torres | |
| 2023 | (Spain) Rodri | (Croatia) Bruno Petković | (Norway) Erling Haaland (Serbia) Aleksandar Mitrović | |
| 2025 | (Portugal) Nuno Mendes | (France) Rayan Cherki | (Sweden) Viktor Gyökeres | |

== See also ==
- AFC Nations League
- African Nations League
- CONCACAF Nations League
- UEFA Women's Nations League
