= AFC Nations League =

Asian association football tournament for men's national teams

- Organiser(s): AFC
- Founded: 21 December 2025; 10 months ago
- Region: Asia and Australia
- Teams: 47
- Related competitions: AFC Asian Cup
- 2028–29 AFC Nations League (pilot edition)

The AFC Nations League is a planned international football competition for senior men's national teams, organised by the Asian Football Confederation (AFC). The AFC announced its intention to introduce the competition in December 2025. In October 2026, a draft proposal was reported for a biennial competition.

== History ==
On 21 December 2025, the Asian Football Confederation announced plans to introduce the AFC Nations League as part of its broader strategic efforts to strengthen national team football across the continent. The decision was made following internal consultations, and forms part of the AFC's long-term vision to improve competitive balance and increase international fixtures for its member associations. The AFC cited challenges such as limited opponent availability, rising operational costs, and the declining value of international friendly matches as key reasons for introducing a Nations League competition.

On 4 October 2026, a draft proposal was reported that the AFC was due to present to member associations on 6 October. The proposal would link the competition to qualification for the FIFA World Cup and AFC Asian Cup.

== Format ==
According to the draft proposal reported by ESPN in October 2026, the competition would be held every two years from 2030, with the pilot edition from 2028. The 47 AFC member associations would be divided into three tiers: two tiers of 18 teams each and a third tier of 11 teams, divided into three groups. The tier systems will not be based on geographic zones, instead, teams would be placed into draw pots to produce balanced fixtures.

The editions linked to World Cup qualification would feature six home and away matches each. While the top six teams in the first tier would qualify automatically for the World Cup, the teams finishing seventh to tenth would enter a round-robin play-off for the remaining two automatic places. The third-placed play-off finisher would advance to the intercontinental play-off.

In Asian Cup qualification editions, teams would play three home and away matches each. All first-tier teams and the six highest-placed teams in the second tier would qualify for the Asian Cup. The proposal would also move the Asian Cup scheduled for 2031 to 2032.

The top eight teams in the first tier would advance to a knockout stage for the Nations League title. The proposed knockout stage would comprise home-and-away quarter-finals, followed by semi-finals and a final at a central venue. The proposal also includes promotion and relegation between tiers, with additional places decided by play-offs.

A pilot competition proposed for 2028–29 would determine the initial tier placements. The top tier, which is the third qualifying round for the 2030 FIFA World Cup, would retain the 2026 World Cup qualifying format of three groups of six. The top two teams in each group would qualify for the World Cup, while the next four best-placed teams would enter a play-off for two further places and a place in the intercontinental play-off.

== Finals ==
Season	Finals host	Final			Third place play-off		
Season	Finals host	Winners	Score	Runners-up	Third place	Score	Fourth place
2030–31; Finals	TBD	TBD			TBD		

== See also ==
- AFC Asian Cup
- African Nations League
- CONCACAF Nations League
- UEFA Nations League
