= Chris Nikou =

Australian lawyer

Chris Nikou was the chairman of Football Australia (served from 2018 – 2023) and an Australian lawyer.

== Career ==
=== Football ===
Nikou's interest in football began as a player in a local suburban competition in Melbourne. He gradually gained influence in football after he was appointed as a Director of Football Federation Victoria (served from 2003 – 2008). In 2011, he became Company Secretary of A-League club Melbourne Victory (from April 2011 – October 2014).

Nikou was elected Chairman of Football Federation Australia in November 2018 until November 2023. He had served as a Director of Football Federation Australia since 2014.

Previously, Nikou was a member of the organising committee for the 2015 AFC Asian Cup held in Australia.

During 2018, Nikou was a member of the Congress Review Working Group set up at the request of FIFA to resolve an impasse in governance reforms at Football Federation Australia.

=== Cricket ===
From 2011 to 2018, Nikou was a director of the Melbourne cricket club, the Melbourne Renegades, an Australian professional Twenty20 cricket club. They compete in Australia's Twenty20 cricket competitions, the Big Bash League and the WBBL. Nikou committed to resign from the Melbourne Renegades if re-elected to the board of Football Federation Australia.

=== Football Federation Australia ===
Nikou was elected Chairman of Football Federation Australia in November 2018 and became the first Chairman of FFA who was not a member of the Lowy family. The new chairman promised a more responsive governing body for football in Australia. As promised, Nikou announced the two new A-League expansion clubs to join the competition in 2019 and 2020, just one month after becoming FFA Chairman. The Canberra & Capital Region was again passed over, but Nikou singled out Canberra as a future expansion location.

In January 2019, Nikou announced the termination of contract for Alen Stajcic the coach of the Australian women's team. This announcement has been controversial.

Nikou has been nominated for a position on the executive committee of the Asian Football Confederation. Chris Nikou, was elected on a four-year term, the second Australian ever to serve on the executive committee of the Asian Football Confederation (AFC).

In the early part of 2019, Nikou and the new Football Federation Australia Board have been actively addressing a number of controversial issues in Australian football. The National Club Identity Policy will be replaced. Australia's position in the Asian Football Confederation has been discussed, including support of the current leadership. The bid to host the 2023 FIFA Women's World Cup has been confirmed. Issues surrounding facilities, commercial arrangements, and independence of the A-League competition are under consideration. In July 2019, it was announced that the national competitions would be independent and move to a body controlled by the clubs.

In August 2019, Nikou announced plans to establish an official heritage committee to help preserve Australia's football history.

In September 2023, Nikou announced he'll be stepping down as Chair of Football Australia (FA) in November.

== See also ==
- W-League
