= African Nations League =

African association football tournament for men's national teams

- Organiser(s): CAF
- Founded: 20 December 2025
- Region: Africa
- Teams: 54

The African Nations League (ANL) is a planned continental international men's association football competition contested by the national teams of the CAF member associations. It is scheduled to be introduced as part of a major restructuring of African international football announced in late 2025. The competition is intended to take place annually beginning in 2029, filling the calendar gap that would be created by a change in the scheduling of the Africa Cup of Nations from a biennial event held in odd-numbered years to a quadrennial event held in leap years.

== History ==
The African Nations League was announced by CAF president Patrice Motsepe on 20 December 2025 at a press conference in Rabat, Morocco, ahead of the 2025 Africa Cup of Nations that was beginning in the host nation. The announcement followed a CAF Executive Committee decision to move the Africa Cup of Nations tournament from a biennial schedule to a four-year cycle after the 2028 edition, mirroring the format used by other continental championships such as the UEFA European Championship and Copa América. The African Nations League was created to ensure that there would be competitive continental football for national teams every year to provide additional revenue and sporting opportunities. Motsepe indicated that the ANL would involve all 54 CAF member associations, organised regionally into four zones, with matches played during the FIFA international windows in September and October, with the finals (contested between the four regional winners) held in November each year.

On 29 October 2026, CAF announced that the Africa Cup of Nations would keep a biennial schedule for the foreseeable future. In their decision, CAF cited the fact that the African Nations League would take "several years" to develop into a competition that would be sustainable for football on the continent, both financially and competitively.

== Format ==
The proposed format for the African Nations League would begin with regional group stages, with teams split into four geographic zones: North Africa, East Africa, West Africa, and Central & Southern Africa. The North African zone would feature 6 teams and all others would feature 16. During the consecutive FIFA international windows beginning in September and October, teams in each zone would play group matches against others in their region. The highest-placing teams from those groups would then progress to a final tournament in November, where they would compete to determine the overall African Nations League champion.

On 20 December 2025, the CAF president Patrice Motsepe announced several changes for future development of African football made by the CAF Executive Committee. Among them, Mauritania, which was a country located in West Africa on the western crossroad to North Africa, was officially reassigned to the North African Football Union (NAFA), ending its participation in the zone A of West African Football Union (WAFU) region. With this move, Mauritania would no longer compete in WAFU A tournaments and qualifiers and would theoretically play in the North Africa zone of the CAF Nations League instead of the West Africa zone.

== See also ==
- Africa Cup of Nations
- AFC Nations League
- CONCACAF Nations League
- UEFA Nations League
