= FIFAe Nations Series =

Esports tournament series

Tournament information
- Sport: FIFA esports
- Established: 2019
- Defunct: 2023
- Number of tournaments: 1
- Administrator: FIFA
- Format: Online
- Tournament format: 2v2
- Teams: 24
- Website: fifa.gg

Most recent tournament
- 2023 FIFAe Nations Series

Final champion
- (Brazil) Paulo Henrique Chaves, Pedro Henrique Soares and Paulo Neto

FIFAe Nations Series (FeNS) is an esports tournament series organized by FIFA and its presenting partner EA Sports. Each tournament has member nations that compete in games from the latest incarnation of the FIFA association video game series.

== History ==
Each seasons runs for a whole year, with the FIFAe Nations Cup (FeNC) is the pinnacle event.

The 2021 edition was due to take place in Copenhagen in August 2021, but was cancelled due to the COVID-19 pandemic on 26 July 2021.

== Team ranking ==
The list below gives the official ranking of the eNations provided by FIFA:

As of 25 July 2023

Pos.	Team	Points
1	Brazil	3397.41
2	Netherlands	2000.60
3	Italy	1906.05
4	France	1873.01
5	Argentina	1706.87
6	Morocco	1479.87
7	Sweden	1426.96
8	Saudi Arabia	1366.33
9	Singapore	1350.83
10	Denmark	1339.39

== Results ==
#	Year	Host city	Champions	Score	Runners-up	Teams
1	2019	(England) London	(France) Lucas Cuillerier / Corentin Thuillier	3–2	(Argentina) Nicolas Villalba / Yago Gabriel Fawaz	20
2	2022	(Denmark) Copenhagen	(Brazil) Gabriel Crepaldi, Klinger Correa and Paulo Henrique Chaves	2–1	(Poland) Bartosz Jakubowski, Damian Augustyniak and Kacper Furmanek	24
3	2023	(Saudi Arabia) Riyadh	(Brazil) Paulo Henrique Chaves, Pedro Henrique Soares and Paulo Neto	3–2	(Netherlands) Levi de Weerd, Manuel Bachoore and Emre Yilmaz	24

== Editions ==
=== FIFAe Nations Cup 2022 ===
==== Teams ====
24 teams had taken part in 2022 FIFAe Nations Cup. They were: Argentina, Denmark (Hosts), Peru, Israel, UAE, Netherlands, Poland, Italy, Portugal, Japan, South Korea, Spain, Scotland, Kazakhstan, Singapore, Mexico, Sweden, Morocco, Brazil, India, England, Canada, France (Defending champions) and Germany.

==== Group stage ====
24 teams were drawn into 4 groups of 6 teams each.

Group A	Group B	Group C	Group D
**Argentina**	**Sweden**	Kazakhstan	Morocco
**Denmark** (H)	(United Arab Emirates) **UAE**	**Portugal**	**Mexico**
**Brazil**	**France**	**Spain**	**Italy**
**England**	**Germany**	**Canada**	India
Singapore	Peru	**Israel**	**Netherlands**
Scotland	Japan	South Korea	**Poland**

All matches in Group Stage were played by a single game.

From group stage, top 4 teams qualified for round of 16 which was followed by quarterfinals, semifinals and the final. Bolded teams have qualified for round of 16.

==== Knockout stage ====
Knockout matches are played as two-legged match, with the aggregate score determining the winner. Extra time (and penalties) were used if there's a draw on aggregate (away goals rule is not applied in FIFAe tournaments).

Round of 16
**Denmark**	1	0	**1**
Israel	0	0	**0**
**Italy**	1	4	**5**
Germany	0	0	**0**
**Brazil**	1	1	**2**
Spain	1	0	**1**
Mexico	0	0	**0**
**France**	0	3	**3**
**Argentina**	0	2	**2**
Canada	1	0	**1**
**Sweden**	1	2	**3**
Netherlands	0	1	**1**
**Portugal**	0	2	**2**
England	0	1	**1**
**Poland**	1	2	**3**
(United Arab Emirates) UAE	0	1	**1**

Quarter-finals
Denmark	1	1	**2**
**Italy**	1	4	**5**
**Brazil**	0	2	**2**
France	0	1	**1**
Argentina	0	0	**0**
**Sweden**	0	1	**1**
Portugal	1	0	**1**
**Poland**	0	2	**2**

Semi-finals
Italy	2	2	**4**
**Brazil**	2	3	**5**
Sweden	0	1	**1**
**Poland**	3	3	**6**

Final
**Brazil**	0	2	**2**
Poland	0	1	**1**

=== FIFAe Nations Cup 2023 ===
==== Teams ====
24 teams had taken part in 2023 FIFAe Nations Cup, which was held during the multi-genre Gamers8 event. They were: Argentina, Denmark, Peru, Israel, Saudi Arabia (Hosts), Netherlands, Finland, Italy, Portugal, Malaysia, Qatar, Spain, Turkey, USA, Singapore, South Africa, Sweden, Morocco, Brazil (Defending champions), India, Australia, Canada, France and Germany.

==== Group stage ====
24 teams were drawn into 4 groups of 6 teams each.

Group A	Group B	Group C	Group D
**Argentina**	**Morocco**	**Turkey**	South Africa
**Saudi Arabia** (H)	**Finland**	Portugal	**Israel**
**Denmark**	**France**	Spain	**Germany**
Qatar	**Italy**	**Brazil**	India
Canada	Malaysia	**Australia**	**Peru**
**Netherlands**	(United States) USA	**Singapore**	**Sweden**

All matches in Group Stage were played by a single game.

From group stage, top 4 teams qualified for round of 16 which was followed by quarterfinals, semifinals and the final. Bolded teams have qualified for round of 16.

==== Knockout stage ====
Knockout matches are played as two-legged match, with the aggregate score determining the winner. Extra time (and penalties) were used if there's a draw on aggregate (away goals rule is not applied in FIFAe tournaments).

Round of 16
**Netherlands**	0	2	**2**
Australia	0	1	**1**
**Morocco**	0	3	**3**
Peru	0	2	**2**
**Saudi Arabia**	1	1	**2**
Turkey	1	0	**1**
Israel	0	1	**1**
**Italy**	1	3	**4**
**Argentina**	1	0	**1**
Singapore	0	0	**0**
**France**	1	1	**2**
Sweden	1	0	**1**
**Brazil**	0	1	**1**
Denmark	0	0	**0**
**Finland**	0	3	**3**
Germany	1	1	**2**

Quarter-finals
**Netherlands**	0	5	**5**
Morocco	0	0	**0**
Saudi Arabia	1	0	**1**
**Italy**	1	3	**4**
Argentina	2	0	**2**
**France**	3	2	**5**
**Brazil**	2	2	**4**
Finland	0	1	**1**

Semi-finals
**Netherlands**	0	3	**3**
Italy	0	0	**0**
France	0	0	**0**
**Brazil**	0	2	**2**

Final
Netherlands	2	0	**2**
**Brazil**	0	3	**3**
