= Australia national soccer team =

Australia national soccer team most commonly refers to:

- Australia men's national soccer team
- Australia women's national soccer team

Australia national soccer team may also refer to:

- Australia men's national soccer B team
- Australia men's national under-23 soccer team
- Australia men's national under-20 soccer team
- Australia men's national under-17 soccer team
- Australia national futsal team
- Australia national beach soccer team
- Australia Paralympic soccer team
- Australia women's national soccer B team
- Australia women's national under-23 soccer team
- Australia women's national under-20 soccer team
- Australia women's national under-17 soccer team
- Australia women's national futsal team
