= Japan national eFootball team =

Japan
- Association: Japan Football Association (JFA)
- Confederation: AFC (Asia)
- FIFA code: JPN
First colours	Second colours

First international
- Japan 2–0 Malaysia (21 April 2020)

The Japan national eFootball team represents Japan in international esport competitions and is controlled by the Japan Football Association, the governing body for football, futsal, beach soccer and esports in Japan.

== Results and fixtures ==
Legend

Win Draw Loss Fixture

=== 2023 ===
- Fixtures & Results (2023), JFA.jp

=== 2022 ===
27 January FIFAe Nations Series 2022	Japan	3–3	Australia

27 January FIFAe Nations Series 2022	Singapore	3–3	Japan

28 January FIFAe Nations Series 2022	Indonesia	3–3	Japan

28 January FIFAe Nations Series 2022	Japan	1–4	India

10 March FIFAe Nations Series 2022	Japan	6–0	New Zealand

10 March FIFAe Nations Series 2022	Japan	6–0	South Korea

10 March FIFAe Nations Series 2022	Japan	1–4	Indonesia

7 April FIFAe Nations Series 2022	Japan	4–1	Indonesia

7 April FIFAe Nations Series 2022	Japan	2–2	India

8 April FIFAe Nations Series 2022	Japan	6–0	Malaysia

8 April FIFAe Nations Series 2022	Japan	3–3	Australia

27 July 2022 FIFAe Nations Cup GS Round 1	France	2–0	Japan
16:05

27 July 2022 FIFAe Nations Cup GS Round 2	Japan	0–3	Germany
16:30

27 July 2022 FIFAe Nations Cup GS Round 3	Sweden	0–0	Japan
16:55

27 July 2022 FIFAe Nations Cup GS Round 4	Japan	1–1	United Arab Emirates
17:40

27 July 2022 FIFAe Nations Cup GS Round 5	Peru	0–1	Japan
18:05

28 July 2022 FIFAe Nations Cup GS Round 6	Japan	1–4	France
16:05

28 July 2022 FIFAe Nations Cup GS Round 7	Germany	2–2	Japan
16:30

28 July 2022 FIFAe Nations Cup GS Round 8	Japan	1–3	Sweden
16:55

28 July 2022 FIFAe Nations Cup GS Round 9	United Arab Emirates	3–0	Japan
17:40

28 July 2022 FIFAe Nations Cup GS Round 10	Japan	2–0	Peru
18:05

- Fixtures & Results (2022), JFA.jp

=== 2021 ===
29 April 2021 FIFAe Nations Series 2021	Japan	6–0	Australia
06:00 GMT+00:00

29 April 2021 FIFAe Nations Series 2021	Japan	6–0	Australia
07:00 GMT+00:00

29 April 2021 FIFAe Nations Series 2021	Malaysia	6–0	Japan
08:00 GMT+00:00

30 April 2021 FIFAe Nations Series 2021	Philippines	4–1	Japan
06:00 GMT+00:00

30 April 2021 FIFAe Nations Series 2021	South Korea	L–W	Japan
07:30 GMT+00:00

1 May 2021 FIFAe Nations Series 2021	India	L–W	Japan
07:30 GMT+00:00

16 December 2021 FIFAe Nations Series 2022	Japan	2–2	Indonesia
10:55 GMT+00:00

16 December 2021 FIFAe Nations Series 2022	Japan	4–1	Malaysia
11:50 GMT+00:00

17 December 2021 FIFAe Nations Series 2022	India	3–3	Japan
10:00 GMT+00:00

17 December 2021 FIFAe Nations Series 2022	South Korea	1–4	Japan
10:55 GMT+00:00

- Fixtures & Results (2021), JFA.jp

=== 2020 ===
21 April 2020 StayAndPlay eFriendlies	Japan	2–0	Malaysia

21 April 2020 StayAndPlay eFriendlies	Japan	4–3	Malaysia

22 April 2020 StayAndPlay eFriendlies	Japan	2–1	Chinese Taipei

22 April 2020 StayAndPlay eFriendlies	Japan	0–3	Chinese Taipei

24 April 2020 StayAndPlay eFriendlies	Japan	0–0	Singapore

24 April 2020 StayAndPlay eFriendlies	Japan	0–4	Singapore

- Fixtures & Results (2020), JFA.jp

== Players ==
=== Current squad ===
The following 5 players were called up for the 2022 FIFAe Nations Series Online Qualifiers matches.

=== Recent call-ups ===
The following players have been called up to the squad in the last 12 months.

== See also ==
- Japan Football Association
- Japan national football team
- Japan national under-23 football team
- Japan national under-20 football team
- Japan national under-17 football team
- Japan national futsal team
- Japan national under-23 futsal team
- Japan national under-20 futsal team
- Japan national beach soccer team
