= Women's football in Brunei =

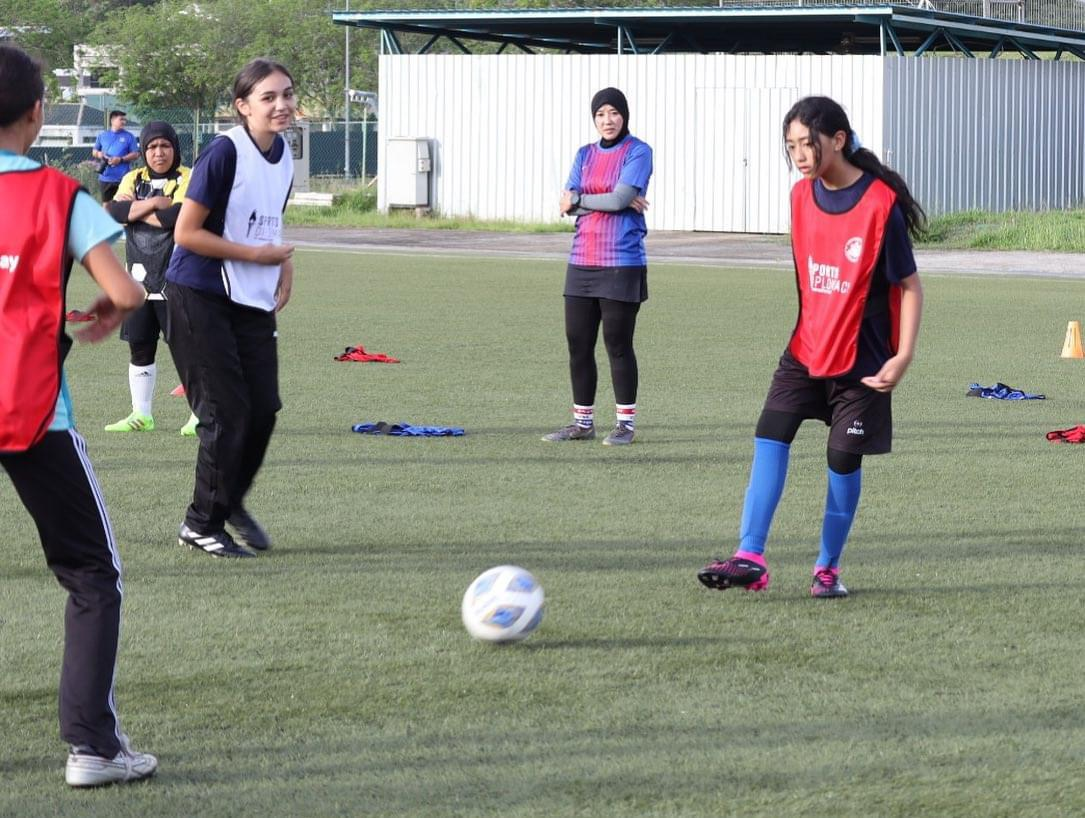
- Princess Muneerah playing football in 2023
- Country: Brunei Darussalam
- Governing body: Football Association of Brunei Darussalam
- National team: None

Under the current Sharia law, women's football in Brunei Darussalam is prohibited. Though women were banned from playing, football was the second most popular sport in the country for women. There are no registered female players in the country. While there is limited support for women's football in the country, only foreign females at Berakas International School are allowed to play within the school campus. There are also some women futsal teams set up as regional representatives on occasion.

== History ==
As of 2025, the women's national team has not competed at the Women's World Cup. In 2005, the country was one of seven teams that included Thailand, Indonesia, East Timor, Malaysia, Cambodia, Laos, Vietnam, Myanmar, and Singapore, that were expected to field a women's football team to compete at the Southeast Asian Games in Marikina in December. As of 2006, there was no official senior a team or junior national team. The team is not ranked in the world by FIFA.

== Recent efforts ==
In June 2023, former United States women's soccer internationals Lorrie Fair and Amy Griffin visited Brunei for a week-long series of meetings and lectures organised by the U.S. State Department under the Sports Envoy Programme. The then Football Association of Brunei Darussalam (FABD) President Pengiran Haji Matusin stated at a news conference for the United States (US) Sports Envoy Program on 6 June that the FABD would continue to work toward the goal of growing women's football in the nation despite the difficulties encountered.

In April 2026, the FABD organised a women's football referee course conducted by acclaimed referee Sachiko Yamagishi. A 'D' certificate coaching course for women's football was also run by the football association in the same month. A football clinic for girls between 5 and 18 will be hosted by FABD in May 2026.
